= 7th South Indian International Movie Awards =

Indian annual film awards event

- Date: 14 – 15 September 2018
- Site: Bollywood Parks, Dubai, United Arab Emirates
- Hosted by: Rahul Ramakrishna, Priyadarshi Pulikonda, Sreemukhi
- Produced by: Vibri Media Group
- Organized by: Vibri Media Group

Highlights
- Best Picture: Baahubali 2: The Conclusion (Telugu); Raajakumara (Kannada); Thondimuthalum Driksakshiyum (Malayalam)
- Most awards: Vikram Vedha (Tamil) Baahubali 2: The Conclusion — 7

Television coverage
- Channel: Gemini TV (Telugu), Sun TV (Tamil), Surya TV (Malayalam), Udaya TV(Kannada)
- Network: Sun TV Network

The 7th South Indian International Movie Awards is an awards event held in Dubai on 14 and 15 September 2018. It aims to recognize notable films and performances from the past year in Telugu, Tamil, Malayalam, and Kannada films, along with special honors for lifetime contributions and a few special awards. The nomination list for the main awards was announced in June 2017.

== Honorary awards ==
- P. Suseela (Lifetime Achievement Award)

== Other Awards ==
- SIIMA Award for Best Cinematographer – K. K. Senthil Kumar (Baahubali 2: The Conclusion)

== Main awards winners and nominees ==
=== Film ===
Best Film
Tamil	Telugu
Vikram Vedha – S. Sashikanth; Aramm – Kotapadi Ramesh; Aruvi – S. R. Prabhu; Mersal – N. Ramasamy; Theeran Adhigaram Ondru – S. R. Prabhu	Baahubali 2: The Conclusion – Shobu Yarlagadda; Fidaa – Dil Raju; Gautamiputra Satakarni – Y. Rajeev Reddy; Ghazi – K. Anvesh Reddy, Prasad V. Potluri; Sathamanam Bhavati – Dil Raju
Kannada	Malayalam
Raajakumara – Vijay Kiragandur; Bharjari – R. Srinivas; Chamak – T. R. Chandrashekar; Chowka – Dwarakish Chitra; Ondu Motteya Kathe – Suhan Prasad	Thondimuthalum Driksakshiyum – Sandip Senan; Angamaly Diaries – Vijay Babu; Mayanadhi – Aashiq Abu; Parava – Anwar Rasheed; Take Off – Anto Joseph
SIIMA Award for Best Director
Tamil	Telugu
Atlee – Mersal; Arun Prabhu Purushothaman – Aruvi; Gopi Nainar – Aramm; H. Vinoth – Theeran Adhigaaram Ondru; Pushkar-Gayathri – Vikram Vedha	S. S. Rajamouli – Baahubali 2: The Conclusion; Krish – Gautamiputra Satakarni; Sandeep Reddy Vanga – Arjun Reddy; Sankalp Reddy – Ghazi; Satish Vegesna – Sathamanam Bhavati
Kannada	Malayalam
Santhosh Ananddram – Raajakumara; Chethan Kumar– Bharjari; P. C. Shekhar – Raaga; Prakash Jayaram – Taarak; Suni – Chamak	Dileesh Pothan – Thondimuthalum Driksakshiyum; Aashiq Abu – Mayanadhi; Lijo Jose Pellissery – Angamaly Diaries; Mahesh Narayan – Take Off; Soubin Shahir- Parava

=== Acting ===
Best Actor
Tamil	Telugu
Sivakarthikeyan – Velaikkaran; Karthi – Theeran Adhigaaram Ondru; Vishal – Thupparivaalan; Vijay – Mersal; Vijay Sethupathi – Vikram Vedha	Prabhas – Baahubali 2: The Conclusion; Nandamuri Balakrishna – Gautamiputra Satakarni; NTR Jr. – Jai Lava Kusa; Rana Daggubati – Nene Raju Nene Mantri; Vijay Devarakonda - Arjun Reddy
Kannada	Malayalam
Puneeth Rajkumar– Raajakumara; Dhruva Sarja – Bharjari; Ganesh – Chamak; Shiva Rajkumar – Mufti; Sri Murali – Mufti	Nivin Pauly – Njandukalude Nattil Oridavela; Nivin Pauly – Sakhavu; Fahadh Faasil – Thondimuthalum Driksakshiyum; Mammootty – The Great Father; Tovino Thomas – Mayanadhi
Best Actress
Tamil	Telugu
Nayanthara – Aramm; Aditi Balan – Aruvi; Andrea Jeremiah – Taramani; Jyothika – Magalir Mattum; Nithya Menen – Mersal	Kajal Aggarwal – Nene Raju Nene Mantri; Anushka Shetty – Baahubali 2: The Conclusion; Rakul Preet Singh – Jaya Janaki Nayaka; Sai Pallavi – Fidaa
Kannada	Malayalam
Shanvi Srivastava – Taarak; Nivedhitha – Shuddhi; Rashmika Mandanna – Chamak; Shraddha Srinath – Operation Alamelamma; Shruti Hariharan – Beautiful Manasugalu	Parvathy – Take Off; Aishwarya Lekshmi– Mayanadhi; Manju Warrier – Udaharanam Sujatha; Nimisha Sajayan – Thondimuthalum Driksakshiyum; Anu Sithara – Ramante Edanthottam
SIIMA Award for Best Actor in a Supporting Role
Tamil	Telugu
M. S. Bhaskar – 8 Thottakkal; Bharathiraja – Kurangu Bommai; Bobby Simha – Thiruttu Payale 2; Vikranth – Thondan; Vivek Prasanna – Meyaadha Maan	Aadhi Pinisetty – Ninnu Kori; Kay Kay Menon – Ghazi; Prakash Raj – Sathamanam Bhavati; Sathyaraj – Baahubali 2: The Conclusion; Sree Vishnu – Vunnadhi Okate Zindagi
Kannada	Malayalam
Kashinath – Chowka; Diganth – Happy New Year; P. Ravishankar – College Kumar; Rajesh Nataranga – Operation Alamelamma; Suraj Gowda – Siliconn City	Shane Nigam – Parava; Suraj Venjaramoodu – Thondimuthalum Driksakshiyum; Joju George – Ramante Edanthottam; Kunchacko Boban – Take Off; Mukesh – Jomonte Suvisheshangal
SIIMA Award for Best Actress in a Supporting Role
Tamil	Telugu
Sshivada – Adhe Kangal; Anjali Varathan – Aruvi; Indhuja Ravichandran – Meyaadha Maan; Sneha – Velaikkaran; Varalaxmi Sarathkumar – Vikram Vedha/ Nibunan	Bhoomika Chawla – Middle Class Abbayi; Hema Malini – Gautamiputra Satakarni; Jayasudha – Sathamanam Bhavati; Radhika Sarathkumar – Raja The Great; Ramya Krishna – Baahubali 2: The Conclusion
Kannada	Malayalam
Aruna Balraj – Operation Alamelamma; Bhavana Rao – Satya Harischandra; Harshika Poonacha – Upendra Matte Baa; Saanika – Saheba; Samyukta Hornad – Dayavittu Gamanisi	Asha Sarath – Sunday Holiday; Amala Akkineni – C/O Saira Banu; Chandini Sreedharan – CIA; Mamta Mohandas – Udaharanam Sujatha; Shanthi Krishna – Njandukalude Nattil Oridavela
SIIMA Award for Best Actor in a Negative Role
Tamil	Telugu
S. J. Surya – Mersal / Spyder; Arvind Swamy – Bogan; Fahadh Faasil – Velaikkaran; Prasanna – Thiruttu Payale 2; Vivek Oberoi – Vivegam	Rana Daggubati – Baahubali 2: The Conclusion; Arjun Sarja – LIE; Rao Ramesh – Duvvada Jagannadham; Tarun Arora – Khaidi No. 150; Vijay Varma – Middle Class Abbayi
Kannada	Malayalam
Ashish Vidyarthi – Pataki; Apeksha Purohit – Kaafi Thota; P. Ravishankar – Hebbuli; Prakash Raj – Raajakumara; Shawar Ali – Chakravarthy	Appani Sarath – Angamaly Diaries; Chemban Vinod Jose – Velipadinte Pusthakam; Murali Gopy – Kaattu; Soubin Shahir – Parava; Unni Mukundan – Masterpiece
SIIMA Award for Best Comedian
Tamil	Telugu
Soori – Sangili Bungili Kadhava Thorae; Anandaraj – Maragadha Naanayam; RJ Balaji – Ivan Thanthiran; Robo Shankar – Velaikkaran; Yogi Babu – Mersal	Rahul Ramakrishna – Arjun Reddy; Praveen – Sathamanam Bhavati; Prudhvi Raj – PSV Garuda Vega; Shakalaka Shankar – Anando Brahma; Srinivas Reddy – Anando Brahma / Raja The Great
Kannada	Malayalam
Chikkanna – Anjani putra; Kuri Prathap – Melkote Manja; Sadhu Kokila – Chamak; Saikumar – Happy New Year; Vijay Chendur – Pataki	Aju Varghese – Godha; Dharmajan – Punyalan Private Limited; Hareesh Perumanna – Rakshadhikari Baiju Oppu; Jacob Gregory – Jomonte Suvisheshangal; Saiju Kurup – Aadu 2

=== Debut awards ===
SIIMA Award for Best Debut Actor
Tamil	Telugu
Vasanth Ravi – Taramani; Hiphop Tamizha – Meesaya Murukku; Vetri – 8 Thottakkal	Ishaan – Rogue; Aashish Raj – Aakatayi; Ganta Ravi – Jayadev; Rakshit – London Babulu; Vishwak Sen – Vellipomakey
Kannada	Malayalam
Rishi – Operation Alamelamma; Ishaan – Rogue; Manoranjan – Saheba; Mithra – Raaga; Raj B. Shetty – Ondu Motteya Kathe	Antony Varghese – Angamaly Diaries; Amal Shah – Parava; Arjun Asokan – Parava; Askar Ali – Honey Bee 2.5; Sarath Appani – Angamaly Diaries
SIIMA Award for Best Debut Actress
Tamil	Telugu
Aditi Rao Hydari – Kaatru Veliyidai; Aditi Balan – Aruvi; Priya Bhavani Shankar – Meyaadha Maan; Sayyeshaa Saigal – Vanamagan; Shraddha Srinath – Vikram Vedha	Kalyani Priyadarshan – Hello; Aakanksha Singh – Malli Raava; Megha Akash – LIE; Nivetha Pethuraj – Mental Madhilo; Shalini Pandey – Arjun Reddy
Kannada	Malayalam
Ekta Rathod – Siliconn City; Aditi Prabhudeva – Dhairyam; Divya Uruduga – Huliraaya; Kavitha Gowda – Srinivasa Kalyana; Vaibhavi Shandilya – Raj Vishnu	Nimisha Sajayan – 'Thondimuthalum Driksakshiyum'; Aishwarya Lekshmi – Njandukalude Nattil Oridavela; Reshma Anna Rajan – Angamaly Diaries; Santhy Balachandran – Tharangam; Wamiqa Gabbi – Godha
SIIMA Award for Best Debut Director
Tamil	Telugu
Arun Prabhu Purushothaman – Aruvi; Dhanush – Pa. Pandi; Gopi Nainar – Aramm; Lokesh Kanagaraj – Maanagaram; Rajkumar Periaswamy – Rangoon	Sandeep Vanga – Arjun Reddy; Mahi V. Raghav – Anando Brahma; Prabhakar Podakandla – Next Nuvve; Sankalp Reddy – Ghazi; Vivek Athreya – Mental Madhilo
Kannada	Malayalam
Tharun Sudhir – Chowka; Adarsh Eshwarappa – Shuddhi; Pannaga Bharana – Happy New Year; Raj B. Shetty – Ondu Motteya Kathe; Ravi Basrur – Kataka	Mahesh Narayan – Take Off; Arun Gopy – Ramaleela; Haneef Adeni – The Great Father; Jay K – Ezra; Soubin Shahir – Parava

=== Music ===
SIIMA Award for Best Music Director
Tamil	Telugu
A. R. Rahman – Kaatru Veliyidai / Mersal; Anirudh Ravichander – Velaikkaran/ Vivegam; D. Imman – Bogan; Hiphop Tamizha – Meesaya Murukku; Sam C. S. – Vikram Vedha	M. M. Keeravani – Baahubali 2: The Conclusion; Devi Sri Prasad – Khaidi No. 150; Gopi Sundar – Ninnu Kori; S. S. Thaman – Mahanubhavudu; Shakti Kanth – Fidaa
Kannada	Malayalam
V. Harikrishna – Raajakumara; Arjun Janya – Chakravarthy; Charan Raj – Pushpaka Vimana; Judah Sandhy – Chamak; Raghu Dixit – Happy New Year	Shaan Rahman – Velipadinte Pusthakam; Gopi Sundar – Comrade in America; Bijibal – Thondimuthalum Driksakshiyum; Prashant Pillai – Angamaly Diaries; Rex Vijayan – Parava
SIIMA Award for Best Lyricist
Tamil	Telugu
Vivek – "Aalaporan Thamizhan" from Mersal; Dhanush – "Venpani Malare" from Pa. Pandi; Madhan Karky – "Azhagiyae" from Kaatru Veliyidai; Vairamuthu – "Vaan" from Kaatru Veliyidai; Viveka – "Karuthavanlaam" from Velaikkaran	Suddala Ashok Teja – "Vachinde" from Fidaa; Chandrabose – "Nuvvele Nuvvele" from Jaya Janaki Nayaka; Ramajogayya Sastry – "Nilavade" from Sathamanam Bhavati; Siva Shakti Dutta – "Saahore Baahubali" from Baahubali 2: The Conclusion; Sri Mani – "Bramaramba Ki" from Rarandoi Veduka Chudham
Kannada	Malayalam
Santhosh Ananddram – "Bombe Heluthaithe" from Raajakumara; Hrudaya Shiva – "Kodeyondara Adiyalli" from Raju Kannada Medium; Suvarna Sharma – "Thili Prema" from Urvi; V. Nagendra Prasad – "Appa I Love You" from Chowka; Yogaraj Bhat – "Ninna Snehadinda" from Mugulu Nage	Manu Manjith – "Aaro Nenjil" from Godha; Anwar Ali – "Mizhiyil Ninnum" from Mayanadhi; B. K. Harinarayanan – "Njaanum Neeyum" from Theeram; Santhosh Varma – "Akaleyoru" from Ramante Edanthottam; Vinayak Sasikumar – "Pyar Pyar" from Parava
SIIMA Award for Best Male Playback Singer
Tamil	Telugu
Sid Sriram – "Maacho" from Mersal; A. R. Rahman – "Neethane Neethane" from Mersal; Anirudh Ravichander – "Yaanji" from Vikram Vedha; Haricharan/ Arjun Chandy – "Azhagiye" from Kaatru Veliyidai; Hiphop Tamizha/ Sudarshan Ashok – "Kavan" from Oxygen	Kaala Bhairava – "Dandaalayya" from Baahubali 2: The Conclusion; Armaan Malik – "Hello" from Hello; Devi Sri Prasad – "Ammadu Lets Do Kummudu" from Khaidi No. 150; Hemachandra – "Oosupodhu" from Fidaa; Sid Sriram – "Adiga Adiga" from Ninnu Kori
Kannada	Malayalam
Ravi Basrur – "Chanda Chanda" from Anjani Putra; Armaan Malik – "Ondu Malebillu" from Chakravarthy; B. J. Bharath – "Beautiful Manasugalu" from Beautiful Manasugalu; Sanjith Hegde – "Kush Kush" from Chamak; Vijay Prakash – "Bombe Heluthaithe" from Raajakumara	Vineeth Sreenivasan – "Jaanah Meri Jaanah" from Cappucino; Arvind Venugopal – "Mazha Paadum" from Sunday Holiday; Haricharan – "Lailakame" from Ezra; Shahabaz Aman – "Mizhiyil" from Mayanadhi; Vijay Yesudas – "Ivalaaro" from Oru Mexican Aparatha
SIIMA Award for Best Female Playback Singer
Tamil	Telugu
Luksimi Sivaneswaralingam – "Senthoora" from Bogan; Sakthisree Gopalan – "Yaanji" from Vikram Vedha; Shashaa Tirupati – "Vaan" from Kaatru Veliyidai; Shreya Ghoshal – "Neethane Neethane" from Mersal; Shweta Mohan – "Paarthen" from Pa. Pandi	Madhu Priya – "Vacchinde" from Fidaa; Geetha Madhuri / M. M. Manasi – "Mahanubhavudu" from Mahanubhavudu; Neha Bhasin – "Swing Zara" from Jai Lava Kusa; Sony – "Hamsa Naava" from Baahubali 2: The Conclusion; Uma Neha – "Paisa Vasool" from Paisa Vasool
Kannada	Malayalam
Anuradha Bhat – "Appa I Love You" from Chowka; Indu Nagaraj – "Jilkaa Jilkaa" from Pushpaka Vimana; Sinchan Dixit – "Indu Ninna Edurali" from Kaafi Thota; Shreya Ghoshal – "Ninna Snehadinda" from Mugulu Nage; Supriya Lohith – "Are Are Enidu" from Chamak	Gowry Lekshmi – "Aaro Nenjil" from Godha; K. S. Chithra – "Nadavathil Thurannilla" from Kambhoji; Shweta Mohan – "Ozhukiyozhuki" from Oru Cinemakkaran; Soumya Ramakrishnan – "Kannile Poika" from Thondimuthalum Driksakshiyum; Sujatha Mohan – "Neelakasham" from Jomonte Suvisheshangal

== Critics' choice ==
Kollywood

- Best Actor – R. Madhavan – Vikram Vedha
- Best Actress – Aditi Balan – Aruvi

Tollywood

- Best Actor – Venkatesh and Nandamuri Balakrishna – Guru and Gautamiputra Satakarni
- Best Actress – Ritika Singh – Guru

Kannada Cinema

- Best Actor – Sri Murali
- Best Actress – Sruthi Hariharan

Malayalam Cinema

- Best Actor – Fahadh Faasil
- Best Actress – Aishwarya Lekshmi

Special Award

- Best Child Artist – Shlaga Saligrama – Kataka

== Generation Next Awards ==
=== Entertainer of the Year ===
- Rana Daggubati – Baahubali 2: The Conclusion / Ghazi / Nene Raju Nene Mantri
- Style icon of the year – Hansika Motwani
