= Chamak (disambiguation) =

Chamak or chamak may refer to:

- Chamak, a Village in Kerman, Iran
- Chamak (film), a 2017 Indian film by Suni
- Chamak (web series), a 2023 Indian web series by Rohit Jugraj
