= Shubra Aiyappa =

Indian actress

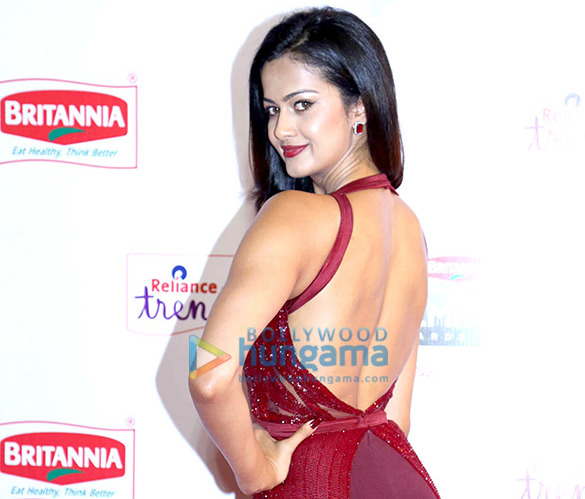
- Born: Rachita; 24 April 1988 (age 38); Kodagu District, Karnataka, India
- Occupations: Actress, Model,
- Years active: 2003 - present
- Works: Full list

Shubra Aiyappa (born 24 April) is an Indian actress who has appeared predominantly in Kannada films, in addition to Tamil and Telugu language films. After making her debut in the Telugu film Prathinidhi (2014), she went on to appear in Sagaptham (2015) and Vajrakaya (2015).

Before venturing into modeling and movies, she studied in Baldwin Girls High School, Bangalore.

== Career ==
After breaking into modelling, Aiyappa appeared in several commercials before being signed on to appear in the Telugu film, Rey (2015), directed by YVS Chowdary. However Aiyappa later opted out of the venture, and signed on to make her acting debut in Prathinidhi (2014), portraying a journalist.

In 2015, Aiyappa appeared in Sagaptham, a Tamil film noted for its launch of Shanmugapandian, the son of actor-politician Vijayakanth. The film opened to poor reviews and Aiyappa's role was minimal

In 2015, She also made her first appearance in a Kannada film during the same year, portraying a guest role in Vajrakaya (2015). Her character appeared in the first fifteen minutes of the film and featured in a song, which was shot in Venice. The film opened to positive reviews and performed well at the box office, prompting further film offers for Aiyappa.

Her next was with Diganth Manchale titled Thimayya & Thimayya which opened to positive to mixed reviews and performed decently at the box office.

She was then seen in the movie Ramana Avatara with actor Rishi and Pranitha subash.

== Filmography ==
Year	Film	Role	Language	Notes
2014	Prathinidhi	Sunaina	Telugu	
2015	Sagaptham	Priya	Tamil	
2015	Vajrakaya	Geetha	Kannada	
2022	Thimayya & Thimayya	Soumya	Kannada	
2024	Ramana Avatara	Poorni	Kannada	
