= Shubhamangala (2022 film) =

2022 film by Santosh G

- Theatrical release poster
- Directed by: Santhosh G
- Written by: Santhosh G Satyaki
- Story by: Santhosh G
- Produced by: Avyakta Films
- Starring: Siddarth Madyamika; Meghana Gaonkar; Hitha Chandrashekar
- Cinematography: Rakesh B Raj
- Edited by: Santhosh Gopal
- Music by: Judah Sandhy
- Production companies: Avyakta Films; Gimmick Keys
- Distributed by: KRG Studios
- Release date: 14 October 2022
- Running time: 119 minutes
- Country: India
- Language: Kannada

Shubhamangala (transl. Happy Ending) is a 2022 Indian Kannada-language comedy drama film written, edited and directed by debutant Santosh G. Starring Siddarth Madyamika, Meghana Gaonkar and Hitha Chandrashekar in lead roles. The film was produced by Avyakta Films with the association of Gimmick Keys banner. The music was composed by Judah Sandhy, while the cinematography and editing were handled by Rakesh B Raj.

Shubhamangala was theatrically released on 14 October 2022, where it received positive reviews from critics.

== Synopsis ==
Shiva is getting arranged married with Vidhya. During reception, night before the marriage ceremony, Anu arrived and secretly proposed Shiva on stage. Anu and Shiva are working together for last 5 years, Anu continuously Shiva's proposal and now she is asking to marry her. Vidhya has big dream's with Shiva. Now Shiva in dilemma, who to marry. Same night, in same place, others also various dilemma, about their love.

== Cast ==
- Meghana Gaonkar as Anulatha
- Hitha Chandrashekar as Vidhya
- Siddarth Madyamika as Shiva Kumar
- Rakesh Maiya as Dileep, shiva's friend
- Anirudh Acharya
- Babu Hirannaiah as David
- Gopalkrishna Deshpande as Manjunath, Photographer
- Aruna Balraj
- Srinivas Prabhu as Shiva's father
- Deepti Nagendra as Dhanya
- Hari Samashti as Kumara, Shiva's friend
- Ila Veermalla as Preethi
- Adithi Ram as Tanisha
- Vijay Chendoor as Pre-wedding videography director
- Prashanth Natana

== Music ==
Shubhamangala

Soundtrack album by Judah Sandhy
- Released: 6 October 2022
- Genre: Feature film soundtrack
- Length: 19:27
- Language: Kannada
- Label: Anand Audio

Judah Sandhy chronology
Sakath (2021)	Shubhamangala (2022)	Buddies (2022)

Judah Sandhy composed the music for the film, K. Kalyan, Jayant Kaikini and Trivikram penned the lyrics.

Track listing
No.	Title	Lyrics	Singer(s)	Length
1.	"Sobaane"	K. Kalyan	Madhuri Sheshadri	3:59
2.	"Hey Kuchu Kuchu"	K. Kalyan	Varun Ramachandra	4:17
3.	"Urulive Kshana"	K. Kalyan	Pancham Jeeva	4:34
4.	"Ee Bhoomi - Sangeeth Song"	Trivikram	Supriyaa Lohith, Pancham Jeeva, Madhuri Sheshadri, Abhijit Y R, Judah Sandhy
5.	"Muthinantha Mathu"	Jayant Kaikini	Ashwin Sharma, Madhuri Sheshadri	4:45
6.	"Preethiye Idena"	K. Kalyan	Supriyaa Ram	1:52
