= Judah Sandhy =

Indian music composer

- Born: Bangalore, Karnataka, India
- Occupation: Music director
- Years active: 2015 - Present
- Spouse: Doly Sandhy

Judah Sandhy is an Indian film music director who predominantly works in Kannada cinema. He is known for the 2017 film Operation Alamelamma.

== Early life ==
Judah was born on 21 January 1989 in Bangalore, Karnataka, India. He went to St. Aloysius College, Bangalore.

== Career ==
Judah Sandhy was the founder member and frontman of Bangalore's based band Slain. After graduating from college he started working for commercials, short films "son of a gun", raju bhai and jingles. He made his debut as a music director in 2015 Kannada film Thamisra. In 2016 he composed music for Lifu Super and Badmaash starring Dhananjay and Sanchita Shetty. In 2017 he composed music for the blockbuster film Operation Alamelamma starring Rishi and Shraddha Srinath and then composed three of the six songs in Uppu Huli Khara. In the same year Sandhy composed music for Chamak starring Ganesh and Rashmika Mandanna.

== Filmography ==
Year	Film	Score	Songs	Language	Notes
2015	Thamisra	Yes	No	Kannada	
2016	Lifu Super	Yes	Yes	Kannada	
2016	Badmaash	Yes	Yes	Kannada	
2016	Adbhutha	Yes	Yes	Kannada	
2016	Thuhere Mere Jaan	Yes	Yes	Telugu	
2017	Operation Alamelamma	Yes	Yes	Kannada	
2017	Jaymahal	Yes	Yes	Kannada	
2017	Uppu Huli Khara	No	Yes	Kannada	Music for 3 Songs
2017	Chamak	Yes	Yes	Kannada	Nominated - SIIMA Award for Best Music Director - Kannada
2018	Idham Premam Jeevanam	Yes	Yes	Kannada	
2018	Thayige Thakka Maga	Yes	Yes	Kannada	Nominated - SIIMA Award for Best Music Director - Kannada
2018	8MM Bullet	Yes	Yes	Kannada	
2019	Chambal	No	Yes	Kannada	Music For 1 Song
2019	ABCD — American Born Confused Desi	Yes	Yes	Telugu	
2020	Shivaji Surathkal	Yes	Yes	Kannada	
2021	Sakath	Yes	Yes	Kannada	
2022	Shubhamangala	Yes	Yes	Kannada	
2022	Aakasha Veedhulo	Yes	Yes	Telugu	
2022	Buddies	Yes	Yes	Kannada	
2022	Dilpasand	Yes	No	Kannada	
2022	Aha Na Pellanta	Yes	Yes	Telugu	TV series
2022	Dear Vikram	No	Yes	Kannada	Composed 2 Songs
2023	Shivaji Surathkal 2	Yes	Yes	Kannada	
2023	Marichi	Yes	Yes	Kannada	
2024	Dhairiyam Sarvartha Sadhanam	Yes	Yes	Kannada	
2024	Ramana Avatara	Yes	Yes	Kannada	
2024	Not Out	Yes	Yes	Kannada	
2024	Hiranya	Yes	Yes	Kannada	
2025	Solo Boy	Yes	Yes	Telugu	
2025	Gatha Vaibhava	Yes	Yes	Kannada	
2025	Bank of Bhagyalakshmi	Yes	Yes	Kannada	
