= Sakath =

2021 Indian Kannada-language crime comedy film

- Release poster
- Directed by: Suni
- Screenplay by: Suni; Sheelam M Swamy
- Produced by: Nisha Venkat Konanki; Suprith
- Starring: Ganesh; Nishvika Naidu; Surbhi
- Cinematography: Santhosh Rai Pathaje
- Edited by: Shantu Kumar
- Music by: Judah Sandhy
- Production company: KVN Productions
- Release date: 26 November 2021
- Running time: 145 minutes
- Country: India
- Language: Kannada

Sakath is a 2021 Indian Kannada-language black comedy crime thriller film co-written and directed by Suni, and produced by KVN Productions. It stars Ganesh, Nishvika Naidu and Surbhi in the lead roles, and tells the story of a blind singer who becomes pivotal to solving a murder case.

Suni and Sheelam Kiran wrote the story of Sakath based on a real-life incident where a supposedly physically challenged dancer participating in a reality television show was found by the organizers to have normal feet. Sadhu Kokila and Rangayana Raghu feature in supporting roles. Judah Sandhy scored music for the film, while Santhosh Rai Pathaje served as the director of photography and Shantu Kumar as editor.

Sakath opened to mixed to positive reviews from critics upon theatrical release on 26 November 2021. They highlighted the cast performances, cinematography, songs, writing and direction while directing criticism at the film's length.

== Plot ==
Balu is a youngster who aspires to be singer like S. P. Balasubrahmanyam joins a reality show named A andhre Anthyakshari where he pretends to be a visually impaired man due to his friend Sadhu's advice. Balu has a crush on the show's anchor Mayuri where he gets selected for the show.

Slowly, Balu starts to fall for Mayuri, However, he intentionally loses to another blind man, whose mother wanted the prize money for his operation. This earns Mayuri and everyone's respect. Life turns topsy-turvy for Balu as he witness a murder of a social activist named Sadashivaraya whose death made it look like a car accident. Balu, who witnessed doesn't budge and pretends to be blind. Balu tries to impress Mayuri by shifting next to her house and learns that she is Sadashivaraya's relative where he also finds that Sadashivaraya's murder suspect is corporator Praveen Mahabala. A courtroom drama ensues between Balu, who is supported by public prosecutor Vittal Rao and Praveen Mahabala, who is supported by prosecutor Chalapathi.

Meanwhile, Balu learns that Mayuri is actually engaged to Sadashivaraya's son Dhanraj where he decide not to fight the case, Mayuri takes Balu to Drishti school for blind founded by Sadashivaraya and gets him a job of a music teacher. Initially hesitant, Balu teaches the students only to grow affectionate towards them and becomes a favourite of the students. He decide to fight for the school and slowly bonds with a blind teacher named Nakshatra and falls for her. Balu tries to help her regain her eyesight, but her cornea has been damaged since birth, due to which she cannot regain her eyesight. Praveen Mahabala, Chalapathi and Raghuram deducing that Balu might be faking his blindness, decide to spy on him which turns out to be true. They plan to blind him forever and takes the help of Giri, (The director of A andhre Anthyakshari) who has a grudge against Balu. Giri gives Balu an eyedrops which he later puts on the eyes of a hesitant Balu, due to which Balu loses his eyesight.

Though lost his eyesight, Balu continues to investigate. He arrives at the court and reveals that before Sadashivaraya died, in his last words, he called a name Chanti, revealing that Chanti is actually Dhanraj. He reveals that Dhanraj wanted to build a shopping complex by demolishing the blind school which is in the heart of the city of Bangalore, when he goes to Sadashivaraya for approval, Sadashivaraya rejects the proposal due to which Dhanraj plans to use Praveen Mahabala to murder Sadashivaraya by faking his voice with a voice changer and that the postmortem of Sadashivayya was conducted at Dhanraj's hospital. Having exposed, Dhanraj kills himself. Balu reveals to the Judge Pushpalatha that Praveen Mahabala is also a threat to their school and was also involved in Sadashivaraya's death where he request her to imprison Praveen Mahabala.

Enraged, Praveen Mahabala kidnaps Nakshatra and takes Balu to his hideout, intending to kill him. While going for Raghuram to seek a bail for Praveen Mahabala. Praveen Mahabala's brother listens to Raghuram's conversation with his junior lawyer where Raghuram tells that Balu was the one who told to side with Praveen Mahabala in order to learn about their plans, revealing that he and Balu were in cahoots and reveals that it was Balu who gave the eyedrops (which is empty and filled with mineral water), thus revealing that he faked his blindness again and making Praveen Mahabala and Chalapathi believe that he became blind.

Balu defeats the henchmen and confronts one of the men where he learns that Nakshatra wasn't kidnapped, but used a voice recorder to fool Balu that Nakshatra was kidnapped. The film ends with Balu and Nakshatra spending their honeymoon.

== Cast ==
Cast of the film:

- Ganesh as Balaram a.k.a Baalu
  - Vihaan Ganesh as Young Baalu
- Nishvika Naidu as Nakshatra
- Surbhi as Mayuri, reality show anchor
- Rangayana Raghu as Lawyer Chalapathi
- Ravishankar Gowda as Special Public Prosecutor Vittal Rao
- Sadhu Kokila as Sadhu, owner of Melodies Orchestra troupe
- Ramakrishna as Sadashivaraya, Owner of Drishti Shaale
- Shobaraj as Corporator Praveen Mahabala
- Girish Shivanna as Giri, Director of reality TV show
- Dharamanna Kadur as Anjaneya, Singing Show Contestant
- Kuri Prathap as Bhupathy, Singing Show Judge
- D. P. Raghuram as Amoghavarsha Tunga, Singing Show Judge
- Hamsa as Barbara, Singing Show Judge
- Raaghu Raamanakoppa as Lawyer Raghuram
- Malavika Avinash as Pushpalatha, court judge
- Utpal as Dhanraj, Sadashivaraya's son
- Arjun. A.R as Nayan Kumar
- Viswanath Mandalika as Abdulla
- Lakshman Lucky as Auto Ranga
- Prajot P Bekal as Amit
- Sandhya Arakere as Amit's Mother
- Niranjan Kumar as Sadashiv's Partner
- Ashok Rao as Sadashiv's Partner
- Vijeth Gowda as Vegetable Seller
- Venkat Konanki as himself (Cameo)
- Suni as a Bystander (Cameo)
- Harish Raj as Rishi Vedavyasa (Special Appearance)

== Production ==
=== Development ===
When his film Operation Alamelamma (2017) was under production, Suni's associate director sent him an article about a physically challenged dancer who was found out later by the organizers of the reality television show he was participating in, having no issues with his feet. This was taken as a base by Suni to write Sakath. He titled it Chamak and narrated the story to Ganesh alongside another one titled Simpalag Ond Marriage Story. Ganesh liked the latter better, and was first adapted into a film titled Chamak (2017). Sakath was the titled adopted for the first of Suni's stories and the film adaptation was announced in February 2020 with Ganesh as the lead. It was reported that KVN Productions would produce the film. The New Indian Express reported that the plot "revolves around a present-day reality show and court case." Director Suni stated, "A major part of the film will also be a court room drama and Ganesh's character will be pivotal to solving a murder and that forms an interesting part of the story." He also stated that the film was not based on Andhadhun (2018), a film with a similar plot. He added, "With the law being the underline subject, I didn't want to go wrong and even consulted a few lawyers."

=== Casting ===
Surbhi was signed to play the female lead, making her debut in Kannada films. She played an emcee of singing reality television show. It was reported that Judah Sandhy would score music for the film and that Santhosh Rai Pathaje would serve as the cinematographer. Sadhu Kokila, Kuri Prathap, Raghuram, Girish Shivanna and Dharamanna Kadur were reported have been signed to play supporting roles in the film. Malavika Avinash was cast to play a judge. Nishvika Naidu casting was reported in March 2021. She was to play Nakshatra, "a visually challenged teacher, who doubles up as a motivational speaker". Naidu stated that it was "quite a difficult role" and that her "reflexes acted even before I know it, and it was so hard for me to play the role of Nakshatra. I did take time to get the body language right, and even changed the way I speak. Everything about this character was different, and slowly I got used to it." In preparation for their roles, Ganesh and Naidu both studied the body language of visually-challenged singers from videos and documentary films. Ganesh's son Vihaan was cast to play a younger version of his character.

=== Filming ===
Filming began in February 2020 but due to the COVID-19 lockdown it had to be temporarily stalled. It was resumed in January 2021. It was predominantly shot in Bengaluru. The track "Premakke Kannilla" was filmed in a church in Malleswaram.

== Music ==
Sakath

Soundtrack album by Judah Sandhy
- Released: 9 October 2021
- Genre: Feature film soundtrack
- Language: Kannada
- Label: Anand Audio

Judah Sandhy scored background music for the film and its soundtrack. It was his third collaboration with Suni. The soundtrack album comprises five tracks; the first track "Premakke Kannilla" was released on 9 October 2021 and was received well. The title track, a rap song, was sung by S.I.D Rapper and Pancham Jeeva. S.I.D Rapper wrote the rap bits of the song while Suni wrote the "colloquial words". Sandhy added that all musicians involved were based out of Bengaluru, including the Bangalore String Ensemble for the string section of the score. He stated, "Sarangi, Dilruba, Flute, and the Veena instead of digital rendition of those sounds" were used "and retained the natural tempo throughout. I found the Veena player, Mahesh Prasad, on Instagram and even Pancham Jeeva, who has sung three songs in the album, came across via Insta". Other playback singers on the album included Sid Sriram and Shreya Iyer.

Track listing
No.	Title	Lyrics	Singer(s)	Length
1.	"Oh Appu Marali baa"	Pramod Maravanthe	Pancham Jeeva	1:13
2.	"Sakath (Title Track)"	Suni, S.I.D Rapper	S.I.D Rapper, Pancham Jeeva	2:54
3.	"Shuruvaagidhe"	Arjun Luis	Sid Sriram	3:41
4.	"24 Carat Chinna Sakath"	S.I.D Rapper	S.I.D Rapper	1:01
5.	"Baadige Mane"	Cherish Gowda, Jaishanth	Narayan Sharma	3:19
6.	"Neene Naa"	Pramod Maravanthe	Pancham Jeeva	3:48
7.	"Premakke kannilla"	Jayanth Kaikini	Pancham Jeeva	4:26

== Marketing and release ==
A motion poster of Sakath was first released on 1 July 2020, to mark the birthday of Ganesh. The Times of India reported that it had a "peppy number with fast beats." The first teaser was released on 24 October 2021. OTTPlay, in their report, stated: "The teaser more or less confirmed the suspicions that audiences had about whether Balu is actually visually-challenged, considering that some of the visuals of the song Premakke Kannilla had him glancing at heroine Nishvika." It added, "Ganesh does and says stuff that has those around him wondering if he can see, only to have him explain his way out of the situation; like, for instance, when he presses the lift button, which does not have braille on it, with ease, and says that it he's been doing it so long, it's become habit. But the give-away comes towards the end, when Ganesh, as Balu, is shown watching movies that had visually-challenged protagonists, namely Shiva Rajkumar in Kavacha and Ayushmann Khurrana in Andhadhun." Upon completion of post-production work, the film was scheduled for theatrical release on 12 November 2021 but was postponed to accommodate another film, Premam Poojyam. It was released two weeks later, on 26 November.

== Reception ==
Sakath received generally mixed to positive reviews from critics upon release. While the cast performances, writing, music and cinematography received praise, criticism was directed at its length.

The reviewer for the New Indian Express, A. Sharadhaa, gave the film a three-and-a-half out of five rating and called it "a sincere experiment and effortlessly blends a triangular love story, crime drama, and a situational comedy into a commercial entertainer." She commended the acting performances on the film and concluded writing, "Despite the long runtime, the whodunit courtroom drama, which is a solid creative work by the writer in Suni, definitely makes for a new and interesting genre for the audience." Sunayana Suresh of The Times of India too gave the film the same rating and stated that dialogues and cinematography were the "highlight" of the film. She praised the film for its "well shot" courtroom scenes, music and comedy sequences and criticized it for its running time. She also praised the acting performances and wrote, "Ganesh is impressive as Baalu... He emphatically returns to the screens after two years with an impressive performance. Nishvika is subtle, graceful and delivers her best performance. Surbhi is charming in her debut outing. But one has to hand it to the big comic ensemble where each of them is better than the other..." Prathibha Joy wrote for OTTplay applauded Ganesh for his performance and wrote that he "delights in his role as Balu. Ganesh lives and breathes Balu, making it difficult to imagine any other actor in the role" and that he "delivers his lines with ... "earnestness". She also commended Naidu for her "measured performance".

The mainstream Kannada-language media too were unanimous in their praise of the acting performances on the film. However, unlike leading dailies Udayavani and Vijayavani, Prajavani was critical of the film and stated that a serious attempt was not made. Its reviewer added, that the film pales in comparison to similar films made on the same theme, Kaabil (2017) and Andhadhun (2018). TV9 Kannada gave the film a favourable review, rated it 3.5/5, but added that the length of the film was an issue.

== Box office ==
The film had a theatrical run of more than 50 days. The film was a successful venture.
