= List of Kannada songs recorded by Shweta Mohan =

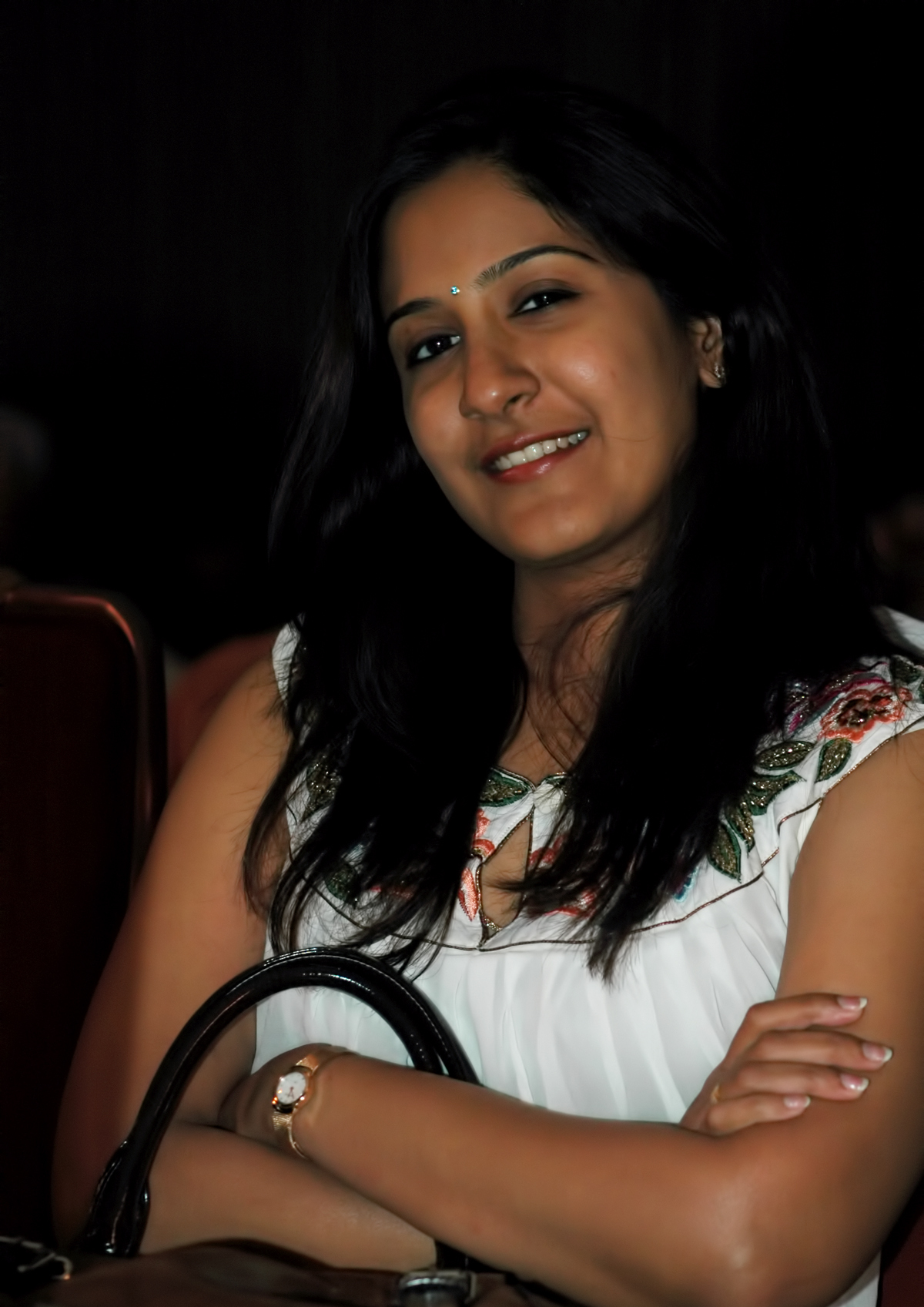
Shweta Mohan

Shweta Mohan (born 19 November 1985) is an Indian playback singer. She has received four Filmfare Awards South for Best Female Playback Singer, one Kerala State Film Awards, and one Tamil Nadu State Film Awards. She has recorded songs for film music and albums in all four South Indian languages namely, Malayalam, Tamil, Telugu, Kannada along with the Hindi language and has established herself as a leading playback singer of South Indian cinema. Some of her inspirations are Sujatha Mohan (her mother), Alka Yagnik and K.S. Chitra.

== Film songs ==
=== 2007 ===
Film	No	Song	Composer(s)	Lyricist(s)	Co-artist(s)
Sajini	1	"Lovely London"	A. R. Rahman	Belluri Ramamurthy	
Right Adre	2	"Gusu Gusu"	Neel	Mayura	Naresh Iyer

=== 2008 ===
Film	No	Song	Composer(s)	Lyricist(s)	Co-artist(s)
Aramane	3	"Pathra Bareyala"	Gurukiran	Kaviraj	Karthik
Puc	4	"Naaviruvaadu Heege"	J Ravi raj	Kaviraj	Karthik
Puc	5	"Yedayenta"	J Ravi raj	Hamsalekha	Karthik
Anjadiru	6	"Manassalu Manassalu"	Sundar C Babu	Pancha Janya	
Nannusire	7	"Nannusire"	Premji Gangai Amaran	Hrudaya Siva	Naveen

=== 2010 ===
Film	No	Song	Composer(s)	Lyricist(s)	Co-artist(s)
Prithvi	8	"Hejjegondu Hejje"	Manikanth Kadri	Kaviraj	Clinton Cerejo, Benny Dayal
Prithvi	9	"Hejjegondu Hejje (Remix)"	Manikanth Kadri	Kaviraj	Clinton Cerejo, Benny Dayal
Gaana Bajaana	10	"Hosadondu Hesaridu"	Joshua Sridhar	Kaviraj	Karthik
Eno Onthara	11	"Dilkush"	V. Harikrishna	Jayanth Kaikini	Sonu Nigam
Parole	12	"Jaduvagi"	Balaji K Mithran	S.Bahubali	Rajesh Krishnan
Zamana	13	"Elu Elu Janmaku"	Karthik Raja	Sudarshan	Ilayaraja

=== 2011 ===
Film	No	Song	Composer(s)	Lyricist(s)	Co-artist(s)
Double Decker	14	"Kanase Nanna"	JayaPaul	Ram Narayan	Anuradha Sriram
Devdas	15	"Sayyare Sayyare"	Joshua Sridhar	V. Nagendra Prasad	Karthik
Devdas	16	"Ko Ko"	Joshua Sridhar	V. Nagendra Prasad	Karthik

=== 2012 ===
Film	No	Song	Composer(s)	Lyricist(s)	Co-artist(s)
Godfather	17	"Sanchari Manasu"	A R Rahman	K. Kalyan	Nivas
Godfather	18	"Sarigama Sangamave"	A R Rahman	K. Kalyan	Megha
Ajantha	19	"Hakka Ba Ondu"	Ilayaraja	Kaviraj	Tippu
Neenena Bhagavantha	20	"Chandamama"	Giridhar Divan	Preetham Sagar	Rajesh Krishnan

=== 2013 ===
Film	No	Song	Composer(s)	Lyricist(s)	Co-artist(s)
Aantharaya	21	"Ea Nasheyu"	Giridhar	V.Nagendra Parasad	Udit Narayan
Ziddi	22	"Olavade Neenu"	Giridhar		
Sihigaali	23	"Ninna Nenadare"	T Raviraj	G R Shankar	Saraswati Naidu

=== 2014 ===
Film	No	Song	Composer(s)	Lyricist(s)	Co-artist(s)
Brahma	24	"Tunta Tunta"	Gurukiran	Kaviraj	
Ka	25	"Shuruvaaithu"(Female)	R S Ganesh Narayan		

=== 2015 ===
Film	No	Song	Composer(s)	Lyricist(s)	Co-artist(s)
Daksha	26	"Mummy Daddy"	S. Narayan		Haricharan
Kendasampige	27	"Kanasali Nadesu"	V. Harikrishna	Jayanth Kaikini	Solo
Katte	28	"Sanihake"	S. A. Rajkumar	Nagendra Prasad	Udit Narayan

=== 2016 ===
Film	No	Song	Composer(s)	Lyricist(s)	Co-artist(s)
Apoorva	29	"Prapanchavu"(Duet)	V Ravichandran	V Ravichandran	
Doddmane Hudga	30	"Kanasivane Nooraru"	V. Harikrishna	Jayanth Kaikini	Karthik

=== 2017 ===
Film	No	Song	Composer(s)	Lyricist(s)	Co-artist(s)
Saheba	31	"Saheba"	V. Harikrishna	Kaviraj	Karthik
March 22	32	"Endaaru"	Manikanth Kadri	Kaviraj	Karthik
College Kumar	33	"Hasi Bisi"	Arjun Janya	Jayanth Kaikini	Solo
Jani	34	"Ellelu Neene Neene"	Jassie Gift	Sivananje Gowda	Udit Narayan

=== 2018 ===
Film	No	Song	Composer(s)	Lyricist(s)	Co-artist(s)
Dhwaja	35	"Agale Eshto"	Santhosh Narayanan	Kaviraj	Sonu Nigam
Dhwaja	36	"Jogaluve Jogaluve"	Santhosh Narayanan	K. Kalyan	
Bhairava Geetha	37	"Modala Modala"	Ravi Shankar	Unknown	Vijay Prakash
Edakallu Guddada Mele	38	"Belakaagidhe"	Ashic Arun	Gurukiran	

=== 2019 ===
Film	No	Song	Composer(s)	Lyricist(s)	Co-artist(s)
Kurukshetra	39	"Jhumma Jhumma"	V. Harikrishna	V. Nagendra Prasad	Anuradha Bhat
Randhawa	40	"Yelli Nodalallella"(Female)	Shashank Sheshagiri	V. Nagendra Prasad	
Randhawa	41	"Yelli Nodalallella"(Duet)	Shashank Sheshagiri	V. Nagendra Prasad	Shashank Sheshagiri
Nanna Prakara	42	"Naa Aakarshithalagiruve"	Arjun Ramu	Kaviraj	Santhosh Venky
Lungi	43	"Nagabeda Ande Naanu"	Arjun Lewis		Armaan Malik

=== 2021 ===
Film	No	Song	Composer(s)	Lyricist(s)	Co-artist(s)
Seethayana	44	"Sanje Gagana"	Padmanabh Bharadwaj	Kaviraj	
Tom And Jerry	45	"Kaadhal"	Mathews Manu	Athanyaa Rachana	

=== 2023 ===
Film	No	Song	Composer(s)	Lyricist(s)	Co-artist(s)	Note(s)
Shaakuntalam	46	"Madhura Gatha Baa"	Mani Sharma	Varadaraj Chikkaballapura	Sathya Prakash	Dubbed Version
Adipurush	47	"Ninna Araso Nanage"	Ajay-Atul	Pramod Maravanthe	Karthik	Dubbed Version
Valatty	48	"Saniha"	Varun Sunil	Kiran Kaverappa	Ayraan	Dubbed Version
Bari 10% Baddi	49	"Naanu Mysuru Mallige"	Dr. Narayan Swamy	Dr. Narayan Swamy		

=== 2024 ===
Film	No	Song	Composer(s)	Lyricist(s)	Co-artist(s)
Ronny-The Ruler	50	"Suguna Suguna"	Kadri Manikanth	Pramod Maravanthe	
Rudra Garuda Purana	51`	"Kann Mundhe Bandu"	Krishna Prasaad	Chinmay Bhavikerie	Kapil Kapilan

=== 2025 ===
Film	No	Song	Composer(s)	Lyricist(s)	Co-artist(s)
Rudra Garuda Purana	52	"Kann Munde Bandu"	KP	Chinmay Bhavikeri	Kapil Kapilan

=== 2026 ===
Film	No	Song	Composer(s)	Lyricist(s)	Co-artist(s)
Ranabaali (D)	53	"Enayya Saami"	Ajay–Atul	Varadaraj Chikkaballapura	Karthik
Life Today	54	"Neene Neene"	Sridhar V Sambhram	Kaviraj	
