= Jodi (2019 film) =

- Theatrical release poster
- Directed by: Vishwanath Arigella
- Written by: Vishwanath Arigella
- Produced by: Sai Venkatesh Gurram; Patchva Padmaja
- Starring: Aadi; Shraddha Srinath
- Cinematography: S. V. Vishweshwar
- Edited by: Ravi Mandala
- Music by: Phani Kalyan
- Release date: 6 September 2019
- Running time: 136 minutes
- Country: India
- Language: Telugu

Jodi (transl. Couple) is a 2019 Indian Telugu-language romantic drama film written and directed by Vishwanath Aarigella. Produced by Sai Venkatesh Gurram and Patchva Padmaja, under the Bhavana Creations banner, the film stars Aadi Saikumar and Shraddha Srinath, and Vennela Kishore, Gollapaudi Maruthi Rao, Naresh and Sithara in supporting roles. It was released on 6 September 2019, and it received mostly negative reviews from critics and average reviews from the audience.

== Plot ==
Kapil, a system administrator, has a rocky relationship with his father after a disastrous bet on a cricket match. He falls in love with a French teacher name Kanchana Mala, who lives with her paternal aunt and uncle after her parents died.

When businessman Avinash accidentally hits Kanchana's grandfather with his car, Kapil chases Avinash down, and they take Kanchana's grandfather to the hospital. Kapil discovers that the victim is Kanchana Mala's grandfather, and he and Kanchana begin dating.

After a happy courtship, Kapil approaches Kanchana's uncle to announce their marriage. However, her uncle rejects Kapil's proposal due to his father's ideals. To prove himself to Kanchana's uncle, Kapil leaves his job and joins Suvarnabhoomi Farms and Lands.

Kapil gets into trouble with his new boss. A chance meeting with Avinash leads them to plot revenge against Kapil's boss, who has taken it upon himself to teach his new employee a lesson.

== Cast ==
- Aadi Saikumar as Kapil
- Shraddha Srinath as Kanchana Mala
- Shiju as Raju, Kanchana's Uncle
- Vennela Kishore as Kapil's boss
- Gollapaudi Maruthi Rao
- Sithara as Vasavi, Kanchana's Aunt, Raju's wife
- Naresh as Kapil's father
- Sathya as Kapil's friend
- Pradeep as Avinash
- Kedar Shankar as Kanchanamala's father and Naresh's friend
- Chinna as Naresh's friend
- Varshini Sounderajan as Madhu Priya

== Soundtrack ==
Jodi

Soundtrack album by Phani Kalyan
- Released: 2019
- Recorded: Pradeep Menon at AM Studios, Chennai
- Venue: Chennai
- Studio: AM Studios
- Length: 22:31
- Language: Telugu
- Label: Aditya Music
- Producer: Phani Kalyan

The soundtrack was composed by Phani Kalyan,

Track list
No.	Title	Lyrics	Singer(s)	Length
1.	"Idi Nijamena"	Anantha Sriram	Yazin Nizar	4:20
2.	"Deniko Emito"	Anantha Sriram	Aditya Rao, Satya Yamini	4:05
3.	"Cheliya Maate"	Anantha Sriram	Haricharan, Sameera Bharadwaj	4:44
4.	"Sakhiya Sakhiya"	Kittu Vissaparagada	Hymath, Aparna Nandan	4:07
5.	"Oh My Daddy"	Anantha Sriram	Phani Kalyan	3:30
6.	"Nuvvu Levanna"	Priyanka	Aparna Nandan
Total length:				22:31
