= Kariya 2 =

2017 film by Prabhu Srinivas

- Film poster
- Directed by: Prabhu Srinivas
- Screenplay by: Prabhu Srinivas
- Story by: Prabhu Srinivas
- Produced by: Anekal Balaraj; Paramesh; Prem Kumar
- Starring: Santhosh Balaraj; Mayuri Kyatari; Ajay Ghosh; Sadhu Kokila
- Cinematography: Srinivas Devamsam
- Edited by: Srikanth Gowda
- Music by: Karan B Krupa
- Production company: Santhosh Enterprises
- Distributed by: Jayanna Films
- Release date: 13 October 2017
- Running time: 123 minutes
- Country: India
- Language: Kannada

Kariya 2 (transl. Blacky 2) is an Indian Kannada action gangster film directed by Prabhu Srinivas starring Santhosh Balaraj in the title role and Mayuri Kyatari in the opposite lead role. The film is produced by Anekal Balaraj through his production company (SE) Santosh Enterprises. The score and soundtrack are composed by Karan B. Krupa while cinematography is handled by Srinivas Dewamsam. Different Danny, Ravi Varma, Mass Madha and Vikram Mor were hired as stunt directors. The movie was dubbed in Hindi as Ghajinikanth. It was reported that the makers had sold the copyrights for the South Korean remake version. This movie is an unrelated sequel to 2003 blockbuster Kariya.

== Plot ==
The movie revolves around Kariya, a local goon who is hired by an underworld Don. Everything was fine until he falls in love with Janu aka Janaki. Janu was affectionate towards her father, but he was killed by the thugs. She misunderstood that Kariya killed her father. As a result, she intelligently kills him through her love drama. Later it is revealed that Kariya is alive and he is unable to recognise others. He can identify Janu. Now, Janu lands in trouble when he sees her and follows her. What happens to them forms the rest of the plot.

== Cast ==
- Santhosh Balaraj as Kariya
- Mayuri Kyatari as Janu aka Janaki
- Ajay Ghosh
- Sadhu Kokila
- Prabhakar
- Ashok
- Vardhan Theerthahalli
- Nagesh Karthik
- Usha
- Raaj Balavaadi
- Ramaswamy
- Suresh Heblikar
- Shivaji Rao Jadhav

== Production ==
=== Development ===
In May 2016, P2 Productions announced their new venture Kariya 2 and shooting started in July 2016. Different Dany, who is known for many popular Kannada films as an action choreographer, was hired.

== Themes ==
The film is set to be an action gangster film which also focuses on the love story of the lead. The film's tagline is "Ivnu Bere Thara", which was revealed by the release of its first-look poster. The poster featuring Santhosh Balaraj illustrated his character as a don. The central theme is how “unconditional love can change anyone,” especially in the life of someone involved in crime.

== Music ==
The film's music is composed by Karan B. Krupa with lyrics penned by Jayanth Kaikini, Manju Mandavya and Chinmay.

Track list
No.	Title	Lyrics	Singer(s)	Length
1.	"Anumaanave Illa"	Kaviraj	Armaan Malik	04:45
2.	"Naa Kaayuthiruve"	Jayanth Kaikini	Sonu Nigam	04:22
3.	"Kariya Barthaavne"	Manju Mandavya	Shashank Sheshagiri	03:58
4.	"Malegalada"	Chinmay	Anuradha Bhat	04:49
