= Witness (2022 film) =

2022 Indian Tamil-language drama film

- Promotional poster
- Directed by: Deepak
- Written by: Muthuvel
- Produced by: T. G. Vishwa Prasad
- Starring: Shraddha Srinath; Rohini
- Cinematography: Deepak
- Edited by: Philomin Raj
- Music by: Ramesh Thamilmani
- Production company: People Media Factory
- Distributed by: SonyLIV
- Release date: 9 December 2022
- Running time: 123 minutes
- Country: India
- Language: Tamil

Witness is a 2022 Indian Tamil-language drama film directed by Deepak. The film stars Shraddha Srinath and Rohini in leading roles. It was released on 9 December 2022 in Sony LIV.

== Plot ==
{{Overview A sanitation worker's life is upended when she learns that her son, who was forced into cleaning a septic tank, died on the job. Furious at the discrimination and indifference she faces, she garners the help of a union worker.}}

== Cast ==
- Shraddha Srinath as Parvathy
- Rohini as Indrani
- Subatra Robert
- Azhagam Perumal
- Shanmugarajan as Sivaprakasam
- G. Selva as Petharaj
- Rajeev Anand
- Thamizharasan as Parthiban
- Sumathi G. as Indrani's colleague

== Production ==
The shoot of the film was completed by December 2021, with the title revealed in May 2022.

== Reception ==
The film was released on SonyLIV on 9 December 2022. A critic from The Hindu gave the film a positive review noting it was "a powerful anti-caste film that doesn’t pull any punches" and that "through powerful storytelling, debutant director Deepak and writer Muthuvel’s film raises important questions and shows the sheer savagery that we, the collective society, are ‘witness’ to". A reviewer from The Hindustan Times called it "a hard-hitting social drama on the horrors of manual scavenging". A critic from The New Indian Express wrote that "Witness will be long remembered for the kind of conversations the women have in the film".
