= Marichi (film) =

Indian Kannada Film

- Theatrical release poster
- Directed by: Siddhruv Siddu
- Written by: Siddhruv Siddu
- Produced by: Siddhruv Siddu; Santosh Mayappa
- Starring: Vijay Raghavendra Gopala Krishna Deshpandey Sonu Gowda
- Cinematography: Manohar Joshi
- Edited by: Srikanth Gowda
- Music by: Judah Sandhy
- Production company: SS REC Productions
- Distributed by: Sridhar Krupa Combines
- Release date: 8 December 2023
- Running time: 129 minutes
- Country: India
- Language: Kannada

Marichi is a 2023 Indian Kannada-language Thriller film written and directed by Siddhruv Siddu, and produced by Siddhruv Siddu and co-produced by.Santosh Mayappa Starring Vijay Raghavendra, Sonu Gowda, with a music score by Judah Sandhy, it was released in India on 8 December 2023.

== Plot ==
The narrative intricately unfolds as a series of systematic murders, each meticulously targeting doctors. These heinous acts are orchestrated by a psychopathic killer who leaves a chilling signature: the victims' lips marred by the corrosive touch of acid.

== Cast ==
- Vijay Raghavendra as DCP Bhairav Nayak, Bengaluru
- Sonu Gowda as Mouna
- Abhi Das as Aryan
- Sruti Patil as Maitri
- Spandana Somanna as Yakira
- Gopal Deshpande as Naga Shetty

== Soundtrack ==
Marichi

Soundtrack album by Judah Sandhy
- Released: 2023
- Recorded: 2022
- Length: 7:46
- Language: Kannada
- Label: Anand Audio

Judah Sandhy chronology
Shivaji Surathkal 2 (2023)	Marichi (2023)	Ramana Avatara (2024)
External audio
- Marichi — Audio Jukebox on YouTube

The music was composed by Judah Sandhy.

Track listing
No.	Title	Lyrics	Singer(s)	Length
1.	"Manada Mele Banna Eseda Maaye Nee"	Pramod Maravanthe	Pancham Jeeva	3:57
2.	"Masanavu Manasu"	Nagarjun Sharma	K. S. Harisankar	3:49
Total length:				7:46

== Reception ==
Reviewing Marichi for The Times of India, Vinay Lokesh gave three stars out of five. Times Now wrote, "A suspenseful thriller that enthralls audiences with a compelling narrative of systematic murders directed at doctors" and gave three stars out of five. A Sharadhaa from The Indian Express reviewed and gave three out of five star for Marichi and states that "Marichi presents a fusion of ancient mythology and contemporary elements, akin to this captivating whodunnit film. The intrigue sparked by the title is skillfully maintained throughout the entire movie".
