= Ramana Avatara =

2024 comedy drama film

- Theatrical release poster
- Directed by: Vikas Pampapathi
- Written by: Vikas Pampapathi
- Produced by: Amrej Suryavanshi
- Starring: Rishi; Pranitha Subhash; Shubra Aiyappa; Arun Sagar; Anirudh Acharya
- Cinematography: Vishnu Prasad; Sameer Deshpande
- Edited by: Amar Nath
- Music by: Judah Sandhy
- Production company: StarFab
- Release date: 10 May 2024
- Country: India
- Language: Kannada

Ramana Avatara (transl. Incarnation of Rama) is a 2024 Indian Kannada romantic comedy drama film directed by Vikas Pampapathi and produced by Amrej Suryavanshi under production Starfab cinemas. The film features Rishi, Pranitha Subash, Shubra Aiyappa, Arun Sagar and Anirudh Acharya in the lead roles. The film's score and soundtrack is composed by Judah Sandhy whilst the cinematography is by Vishnu Prasad P, Sameer Deshpande and editing by Amar Nath.

The film was released on 10 May 2024.

== Plot ==
A jovial guy named Rama Krishna who wants to be a political leader, goes through a series of uncontrollable situations that end up being lessons of life and help him become a true leader.

== Cast ==
- Rishi as Rama Krishna
- Pranitha Subhash
- Shubra Aiyappa
- Arun Sagar
- Anirudh Acharya

== Production ==
The film went into production in December 2018. Shubra Aiyappa was onboarded to play a role in the film. It was also reported that Raj B. Shetty and Danish Sait were also part of the project. The film faced production delays owing the COVID-19 Pandemic and finally completed the shooting in March 2021.

== Soundtrack ==
Ramana Avatara

Soundtrack album by Judah Sandhy
- Released: 2024
- Recorded: 2024
- Genre: Feature film soundtrack
- Length: 12:54
- Label: Jhankar Music

Judah Sandhy chronology
Marichi (2023)	Ramana Avatara (2024)	Not Out (2024)

Judah Sandhy composed the film's background music and scored for its soundtrack. Both the songs of the film which were released as promotional content were well received.

Track listing
No.	Title	Lyrics	Artist(s)	Length
1.	"Rama is a Gentleman"	Nagarjun Sharma	Abhinandan Mahishale	05:28
2.	"Manasu Bereya Dikkali Saagalu"	Simple Suni	Sanjith Hegde	04:04
3.	"Ramana Avatara Title Track"	Vikas Pampapathi	Kishan Bijur	03:22
Total length:				12:54

== Reception ==
A Sharadhaa of The New Indian Express said that “While Ramana Avatara attempts to explore the noble traits of Lord Rama through its protagonist, the film falls short in delivering entertainment value.” Pranati A S of Deccan Herald said that “The film begins well with songs, comedy and action sequences. But as it progresses, it turns into a shoddy retelling of the ‘Ramayana’.”

== Release ==
The film was theatrically released on 10 May 2023 in Kannada and Telugu languages with special premiere shows held on 9 May 2024 in Bengaluru and Mysuru.
