= Priyanka Thimmesh =

Indian actress

- Born: Bhadravathi, Karnataka, India
- Occupation: Actress
- Years active: 2014–present

Priyanka Thimmesh is an Indian actress who mainly works in Kannada films. She has also debuted in Malayalam and Tamil films. She made her debut in the 2015 Kannada film Ganapa.

== Early life ==
Priyanka was born in Bhadravati, Karnataka to Thimmesh and Girija. She has an elder brother. Priyanka did her schooling at St. Charles High School, Bhadravathi and completed her Diploma in Computer Science at Government Woman's Polytechnic College Shivamogga.

== Career ==
Priyanka started acting by taking on roles in serial Preethienda as Kashmiri girl Gulabi which was telecasted in Suvarna TV. She made her debut in films when she acted as Brunda, in Prabhu Srinivas's critically acclaimed Ganapa. She also did a guest appearance in Akira. It was followed by more lead roles in Pataki with Ganesh . Priyanka also played a lead role in the film Bheemasena Nala Maharaja directed by Karthik Saragur and produced by Pushkara Mallikarjunaiah. Priyanka played a lead role in Nivin Pauly's Malayalam film Kayamkulam Kochunni directed by Rosshan Andrrews.

== Filmography ==
Year	Film	Role	Language	Notes
2015	Ganapa	Brunda	Kannada	
2015	Tihar	Maha	Tamil	
2016	Akira	Jaanu	Kannada	
2017	Pataki	Maanvitha	Kannada	
2018	Utharavu Maharaja	Saadhana	Tamil	
2018	Kayamkulam Kochunni	Suhara	Malayalam	
2020	Bheemasena Nalamaharaja	Sarah Mary	Kannada	Amazon Prime Movie
2021	Arjun Gowda	Jaanu	Kannada	
2022	Made in China	Mythili	Kannada	
2022	Sugarless	Mahalakshmi	Kannada	
2024	Sathamindri Mutham Tha	Sandhya	Tamil	

=== Television ===
Year	Show	Role	Network	Note
2011- 2013	Preethiyinda	Gulabi	Star Suvarna	
2018	Sixth Sense Kannada	Contestant	Star Suvarna	
2021	Bigg Boss season 8	Contestant	Colors Kannada	Wildcard entry
2021	Bigg Boss Second Innings	Contestant	Colors Kannada	
