= Solo Boy =

2025 Indian Telugu film by P. Naveen Kumar

- Theatrical release poster
- Directed by: P. Naveen Kumar
- Written by: P. Naveen Kumar
- Produced by: Sevenhills Satish
- Starring: Gautham Krishna; Shweta Avasthi; Ramya Pasupuleti
- Cinematography: Thrilok Siddu
- Edited by: Prawin Pudi
- Music by: Judah Sandhy
- Production company: Sevenhills Productions
- Release date: 4 July 2025
- Running time: 133 minutes
- Country: India
- Language: Telugu

Solo Boy is a 2025 Indian Telugu-language drama film written and directed by P. Naveen Kumar. It stars Gautham Krishna, Shweta Avasthi and Ramya Pasupuleti in lead roles.

The film was released on 4 July 2025.

== Plot ==
Krishna, a young successful businessman shares his journey to a new fresher student of his previous college.

Krishna, a young middle-class boy, fell in love with Priya on his first day of engineering college. Their bond gradually became stronger. Krishna's parents were also aware of their relationship. But, because of his low salary and middle-class background, Priya broke up with Krishna. Krishna became frustrated and depressed for many days. After getting inspiration from his father, he made a fresh start. He met a girl, named Shruti in his company. They first became friends and then lovers. After talking with their parents, they married each other. On his friend's marriage ceremony, Krishna introduced his wife with Priya, his ex-girlfriend. Priya became jealous after seeing them together. Krishna cleared all misconceptions of his wife, Shruti regarding his relationship with Priya. The happy family was going smoothly. But, Krishna's father become ill and almost 1 crore rupees was spent on his treatment. Krishna and his wife lost all their properties and took many loans also. Unfortunately, he died. Shruti couldn't manage and tolerate all these difficult situations. So, she decided to take divorce.

Regardless all these harsh incidents, Krishna thought about his father's inspiration and started a new journey. He decided to make his own company. Krishna first became a delivery boy to make his livelihood. After getting awarded about the difficulties of farmer in selling their products at appropriate price, he decided to launch an app which would help both farmers and customers. But, there were many hurdles on his way. Due to his hardwork, he abled to overcome all those difficulties. After seeing his dedication towards his work, a businessman agreed to give funds to Krishna. But, his friend lied him and sold the app to another businessman at a cost of 20 crore rupees. Still, he didn't lose his confidence. Police arrested him in the case of fraud. When Krishna's wife knew all these incidents, she collected proofs against Krishna's friend and that fraud businessman. She bailed out Krishna from jail. But, Krishna didn't file any case against his friend as he had accompanied him in his all harsh conditions. After getting funds from his old college friends, only because of his dedication and hardwork, finally he launched his app named 'One Touch App'. He celebrated his success with his family members, employees, friends and also forgave his old friend, who had sold her previous app. Krishna became a billionaire and publishers started publishing his journey in books, i.e. 'Delivery Boy to Billionaire'.

Now, after explaining his story to that student, he goes for his speech and motivated all students. He mainly credits this success to his parents, who supported him throughout his life. At last, but not the least, he declared to divide his net worth, i.e. 3500 crore among all employees of his company and signs off.

== Cast ==
- Gautham Krishna as Krishnamurthy
- Shweta Avasthi as Shruthi
- Ramya Pasupuleti as Priya
- Posani Krishna Murali as Krishnamurthy's father
- Anitha Chowdhary as Krishnamurthy's mother
- Shafi
- RK Mama
- Chakrapani Ananda
- Arun Kumar
- Bhadram
- Viren Thambidorai
- Ping Pong Surya
- Lab Sharath

== Music ==
The background score and soundtrack were composed by Judah Sandhy.

No.	Title	Lyrics	Singer(s)	Length
1.	"Krishnudikentho Priyamaina"	Kalyan Chakravarthy	Haricharan	3:24
2.	"Solo Boy Title Song"	Kasarla Shyam	Rahul Sipligunj	4:40
3.	"Padipoyaaney"	Purna Chari	Judah Sandhy	3:44
4.	"Musire Chikatlu"	Chaitanya Prasad	Kaala Bhairava	3:12
5.	"Nee Thodu Nuvve"	Gautham Krishna	Ritesh G Rao	2:25

== Release and reception ==
Solo Boy was released on 4 July 2025. Post-theatrical digital streaming rights were acquired by Aha and premiered on 26 July 2025.

Suhas Sistu of The Hans India gave a rating of 3 out of 5 and opined that the film "thrives on its emotional core and relatability". Aditya Devulapally of Cinema Express rated the film 2.5 out of 5 and wrote "Solo Boy is a film that almost works. It has its heart in the right place and some truly honest passages, but its ambitions get the better of its craft".
