= Kaliyugam (2025 film) =

- Poster of Tamil version
- Directed by: Pramodh Sundar
- Written by: Pramodh Sundar; Dialogues (Tamil): Karthik Gunasekaran; Athreya; Karkavi; Dialogues (Telugu): Sivaram Kondasani
- Produced by: K. S. Ramakrishna; K. Ramcharan
- Starring: Shraddha Srinath; Kishore
- Cinematography: K. Ramcharan
- Edited by: Nimz
- Music by: Dawn Vincent
- Production companies: RK International; Prime Cinemas
- Distributed by: Mythri Movie Makers (Telugu)
- Release date: 9 May 2025
- Running time: 111 minutes
- Country: India
- Languages: Tamil; Telugu

Kaliyugam is a 2025 Indian post-apocalyptic psychological thriller film written and directed by Pramodh Sundar in his directorial debut. The film is produced by K. S. Ramakrishna and K. Ramcharan under the banners of RK International and Prime Cinemas respectively. It is simultaneously made in Tamil and Telugu, with the Telugu version titled Kaliyugam 2064, starring Shraddha Srinath and Kishore in the lead roles, supported by an ensemble cast. The film was released in theatres on 9 May 2025.

== Plot ==
Set in a dystopian future, Kaliyugam explores themes of survival, morality, and human resilience in a world ravaged by catastrophic events. The story follows a group of individuals confronting both external dangers and internal psychological turmoil as they struggle to retain their humanity in a decaying society.

== Cast ==
- Shraddha Srinath as Pari / Bhoomi
- Kishore as Sketch / Shakti
- Iniyan Subramani as Thomas
- Mithun Shanker
- David Santhosh
- Asmal
- Harry
- Manikandan
- Moses Rajkumar
- Karthick
- Monish
- Kesavan
- Master Ronith
- Abhineesh
- Lokesh
- Aarya Lakshmi
- Victoria Niveditha
- Akshaya
- Bharathi

== Production ==
=== Development ===
After Nerkonda Paarvai (2019), Shraddha Srinath joined hands with debutant director Pramodh Sundar, for an post-apocalyptic thriller film titled Kaliyugam set in the 2050s. The film is produced by K. S. Ramakrishna and K. Ramcharan under the banners of RK International and Prime Cinemas respectively, along with Siddharth Swayamboo as the co-producer. The film has Tamil dialogues jointly written by the Karthik Gunasekaran, Athreya, and Karkavi. Featuring, Shraddha and Kishore, the first-look poster was released in mid-December 2022. The film also features Iniyan Subramani, Harry, Asmal, Santhosh, Mani, Aarya Lekshmi, Moses and Master Ronith in supporting roles. The technical team consists of editor Nimz, cinematographer K Ramcharan, art director Sakthee Venkatraj M, and action choreographer GN Murugan.

=== Filming and post-production ===
Principal photography began in Chennai on 20 January 2021. The final schedule began on 27 December 2021 in a high-budget set erected in Chennai. The entire filming was wrapped and was in post-production stage during the first-look poster release in mid-December 2022. The visual effects and CGI work were completed in Norway.

== Music ==
Kaliyugam / Kaliyugam 2064

Soundtrack album by Dawn Vincent
- Genre: Feature film soundtrack
- Language: Tamil / Telugu
- Producer: Dawn Vincent

Dawn Vincent chronology
Aap Kaise Ho? (2025)	Kaliyugam / Kaliyugam 2064 (2025)

The film has music and background scored by Dawn Vincent.

Tamil
No.	Title	Lyrics	Singer(s)	Length
1.	"Vidiyalin Kural (Soul of Kaliyugam)"	Nachi, Karkavi	Bindu Anirudhan	2:58
2.	"Pasiyin Kural (Pain of Kaliyugam)"	Ekadasi	Kapil Kapilan	2:43

Telugu
No.	Title	Lyrics	Singer(s)	Length
1.	"Surya Kirana Sokam (Soul of Kaliyugam)"	Tummala Mohan Kumar	M. M. Srilekha	2:59
2.	"Aakali Aarthanadham (Pain of Kaliyugam)"	Bharathi Babu	J. V. Sudhanshu	2:43

Background score
No.	Title	Length
1.	"Hope"	2:54
2.	"Never-Ending Search"	1:43
3.	"The Reveal"	1:01
4.	"Trapped"	1:18
5.	"Blessed"	1:30
6.	"Kali Theme"	1:53
7.	"World of Kaliyugam"	2:24

== Release ==
=== Theatrical ===
Kaliyugam was released theatrically on 9 May 2025. The Telugu version titled Kaliyugam 2064 was distributed by Mythri Movie Makers.

=== Home media ===
The movie was later given streaming rights to Sun NXT and it starts stream on 11 July 2025. While Lionsgate Play and Amazon Prime Video also bagged the streaming rights and it also starts to stream on 1 August 2025.

== Reception ==
A critic of The Times of India gave 2/5 stars and wrote "Pramodh Sundar's ambitious dystopian thriller, Kaliyugam, is a film that aims for the sky but abruptly crashes along the way.[...] Kaliyugam 2064 falls under a trap of being a film driven largely by its vision, as the makers falter in pulling off that vision with finesse." Anusha Sundar of OTT Play gave 2/5 stars and wrote "Kaliyugam is ambitious and had high potential. But when it leaves many of its threads incomplete, the film gets a tad bit stretchy and unexplored. [...] Even with Kishore and Shraddha giving their best, Kaliyugam could have been far better if could have given more thought on paper."
