= Kempa (film) =

- DVD cover
- Directed by: Jagadish
- Written by: Jagadish
- Produced by: Anekal Balaraj
- Starring: Santhosh; Thanushika
- Cinematography: Saskamurthy
- Edited by: K M Prakash
- Music by: Gurukiran
- Distributed by: Mohan Das Pai
- Release date: 9 January 2009
- Country: India
- Language: Kannada

Kempa is a 2009 Indian Kannada-language action drama film directed by debutante Jagadish and starring newcomers Santhosh and Thanushika.

== Cast ==
- Santhosh as Kempa
- Thanushika as Bindu
- Pradeep Rawat
- Avinash
- L. Revannaiah Siddaiah
- Ruchita Prasad as journalist
- Pragna as Bindu's sister
- Shakeela as Bindu's mother

== Production ==
The film began production in 2007 under the title Golla. Newcomer Santhosh, son of producer Anekal Balaraj, made his debut with this film. The story is based on a true incident of a shepard's struggle that happened in Gopinatham, the birthplace of Veerappan.

== Soundtrack ==
The music was composed by Gurukiran.

Track listing
| No. | Title | Singer(s) | Length |
|---|---|---|---|
| 1. | "Andhu Omey" | Kunal Ganjawala | 4:26 |
| 2. | "Gollaya Gollaya" | Lakshmi Manmohan | 3:55 |
| 3. | "Hello Ondu Phonu" | S. P. Balasubrahmanyam, Hariharan | 4:58 |
| 4. | "Huva Chelliro" | Hariharan, Malathi | 4:54 |
| 5. | "Suridhu Bedu" | Vijay Yesudas | 4:26 |
| 6. | "Yallaru Maduudu" | Gurukiran | 5:18 |
| Total length: | | | 27:57 |

== Reception ==
R. G. Vijayasarathy of IANS opined that "Kempa could have been a better effort, but for the poor handling in the middle of the film". A critic from Bangalore Mirror wrote that "Kempa could have been a better film".
