= Thurthu Nirgamana =

Indian Kannada film

- Directed by: Hemanth Kumar L
- Produced by: Bharath Kumar; Hemanth Kumar L
- Starring: Sunil Raoh; Sudharani; Hitha Chandrashekar; Samyuktha Hegde
- Cinematography: Prayag Mukundan
- Music by: Dheerendra Doss
- Release date: 24 June 2022
- Country: India
- Language: Kannada

Thurthu Nirgamana (transl. Emergency Exit) is a 2022 Indian Kannada-language Fantasy-drama film directed by Hemanth Kumar. The film stars Sunil Raoh, Hitha Chandrashekar, Samyuktha Hegde and Sudharani in lead roles. The music is done by Dheerendra Doss. The movie is based on a time-loop concept. It also marks the return of Sunil Raoh after a gap of 12 years.

The movie opened to positive reviews with praise for its unique plot and a bold attempt to bring new content in the Kannada film industry after its release on OTT.

== Plot ==
Vikram, an unemployed 32-year-old wastrel wakes up in a hospital mortuary. He finds his younger sister Srishti, his mother and his father mourning his death and learns that he is unable to communicate with anybody, except a nurse and Jeevan, a man in his afterlife after committing suicide by jumping off a building. The nurse makes Vikram realize his death and explains that nobody could escape from the power of death. The trio soon escape the hospital through an Emergency Exit and lands on another world, where the nurse offers Vikram a chance to rewind the last three days of his life only to die at the end of the third day, to which Vikram agrees.

In the morning of the first day, Vikram wakes up at his home, assuming the entire incident with the nurse and Jeevan to be a dream. He then follows his routine as usual. Although Srishti and his father are employed, he remains a freelancer as he dislikes the "tensed" routine of going to work. He plays cricket with younger boys, where he meets Sindhu who develops feelings for him. He later goes for a film show and then to drink tea with his friend in the night.

Vikram repeats the same behaviour in the second day. Srishti is revealed to have a tough time with her boyfriend Bharath, who had quit his job and started a startup. Srishti reveals her fear of Bharath going the same way as her brother Vikram, to which Bharath dismisses. Vikram witnesses their argument. In the third day, Vikram repeats the same behaviour and later recounts on his ex-girlfriend Mili, who had left him due to his lack of motive in life, after being in a relationship with him for seven years. At the end of the third day, Vikram meets an accident and dies, after a heated argument with his friend at the tea stall.

Vikram returns in front of the nurse and Jeevan. The nurse, unsatisfied in how Vikram behaved in his last three days, reveals to him that he is stuck in a time loop in which the last three days and his death keep repeating. The loop would end only when Vikram realizes the true meaning and purpose of his life. Vikram experiences few more episodes of the same time loop. Vikram recollects a visual the nurse had shown him, a taxi cab with a number plate which had caused Vikram's accident. Vikram traces down the taxi cab and tries to contact its driver, Shivu. Shivu is revealed to be a depressed man with the burden of debt. His mother works as a tailor and his pregnant wife is yet to deliver their baby. Despite having a family dependent on him, Shivu has suicidal intentions and purchases a bottle of rat poison.

In the first day of the final episode, Vikram makes several donations to orphanages, charities and those in need. In the second day he befriends Sindhu at the cricket ground, who asks him on a date. Vikram voluntarily enters the Emergency Exit of a building and meets the nurse and Jeevan. He lets them know of his good actions, to which the nurse asks him to fulfill his last duties before his death could approach the next day. Vikram suddenly finds himself at the bar where Shivu drinks. The two meet each other and Vikram makes Shivu realize the value of life and advises him to take care of his mother and his pregnant wife, thereby making him drop his suicidal intentions. Vikram then spends time with Sindhu, revealing to her about his past with Mili and about his family. In the third day, Vikram drops his father at the bus stop as he had always requested and then spends time with his mother. He then meets Bharat at the office and reveals how Srishti values Bharat. Vikram then visits Mili and reveals why their seven-year-relationship had met that sudden end. In the evening Vikram joins his father at his badminton match. Tired of his father's voluntary loses with a score of 22-11, Vikram challenges for a "real" match in which his father wins. At home, Srishti gladly reveals to the family that Bharath had gifted her a ring and had accepted for their wedding, as he had got a change of heart after the conversation with Vikram. In the other world, the nurse meets Jeevan and reveals to him that she, like Jeevan, had committed suicide thousands of years ago and got trapped in this duty of serving the deceased. She then passes her role to Jeevan and leaves the world, thereby attaining redemption.

Vikram, realizing that his time had come, expresses his feelings for his father, his mother and Srishti in a letter. He writes in that the "world" he had wanted to explore was just inside their home; it was the love and memories shared with his family. Vikram then voluntarily comes for the accident and gets hit by the same taxi cab driven by Shivu, who is on a hurry to see his wife on her delivery. Vikram dies from the accident and the time loop officially ends. Shivu then arrives at the hospital and meets his wife and their newborn child, who is hinted to be the reincarnation of Vikram.

== Cast ==
- Sunil Raoh as Vikram
- Sudharani as the nurse
- Achyuth Kumar as Jeevan
- Raj B. Shetty as Shivu, a taxi cab driver
- Hitha Chandrashekar as Mili Sebastian, Vikram's ex-girlfriend
- Samyuktha Hegde as Sindhu, a cricket coach and Vikram's crush
- Aruna Balraj as Saraswati, Vikram's mother
- Nagendra Shah as Lakshman, Vikram's father
- Amrutha Ramamoorthi as Srishti, Vikram's younger sister
- Rishi as the actor who played the hero character Vikram (cameo appearance)
- Bhavana Rao as the actress who played the heroine character (cameo appearance)

== Release ==
The film was released on 24 June 2022. The film premiered on Amazon Prime on 16 September 2022.

== Reception ==
The Times of India rated the movie 3.5 out of 5 saying "There have been films made that speak about the concept of life and death. Rama Rama Re happens to be one such. Thurthu Nirgamana is another attempt that tries to define living, dying and closure in between. The film is not your regular entertainment fare, but it is a beautiful jigsaw puzzle that joins to form a philosophical note that is not preachy."

The Hindu described it as a unique coming-of-age fantasy drama which is different from the regular Kannada commercial potboilers, which are usually dominated by songs, action and sentiment.

Jagadeesh angadi of The Deccan herald rated the movie 3/5 with praise for the story and screenplay.

Prathibha Joy of OTTPlay rated the movie 3/5 and stated "If you are looking for a feel-good family drama, Thurthu Nirgamana is what you should be watching".
