= Not Out (film) =

2024 Indian dark comedy film

- Theatrical release poster
- Directed by: Ambarisha M
- Written by: Ambarisha M
- Produced by: V. Ravi Kumar; Shamshuddin A
- Starring: P. Ravi Shankar; Ajaya Prithvi; Rachana Inder
- Cinematography: Halesh S
- Edited by: K. M. Prakash
- Music by: Judah Sandhy
- Production company: Rashtrakuta Pictures
- Release date: 19 July 2024
- Running time: 132 minutes
- Country: India
- Language: Kannada

Not Out is a 2024 Indian Kannada-language dark comedy film written and directed by Ambarisha M. The film was produced by V. Ravi Kumar and Shamshuddin A under the banner of Rashtrakuta Pictures. The film stars P. Ravi Shankar, Ajaya Prithvi, and Rachana Inder.

== Cast ==
- P. Ravi Shankar as Ontikoppal Devaraj
- Ajaya Prithvi as Ajay
- Rachana Inder as Sridevi
- Cockroach Sudhi as Snake Seena
- Salman
- Prashanth Siddi
- Gopalkrishna Deshpande as Sridhar
- Govinde Gowda as Waiter Michael
- Ashwin Hasan
- Niroop

== Production ==
The film's narrative is inspired by the traditional Indian game of Lambs and tigers. The script was written by Ambarisha M during the COVID-19 lockdown. The film was produced by Rashtrakuta Pictures, with V. Ravi Kumar and Shamshuddin A as producers. Ajaya Prithvi, son of V. Ravi Kumar, was cast in the lead role. The principal photography of the film took place in Bangalore and Mysore.

== Reception ==
Vinay Lokesh of The Times of India said that “Director Ambarisha has chosen an edge-of-the-seat subject, nicely intertwined with subplots that include thriller and love elements, almost falling perfectly into place.” Jagadish Angadi of Deccan Herald said that “The story is presented as a flashback. In a way, the narrative itself is the protagonist.”

== Soundtrack ==
Not Out

Soundtrack album by Judah Sandhy
- Released: 2024
- Genre: Feature film soundtrack
- Length: 6:40
- Language: Kannada
- Label: Think Music

Judah Sandhy chronology
Ramana Avatara (2024)	Not Out (2024)	Hiranya (2024)

The soundtrack was composed by Judah Sandhy.

Track listing
No.	Title	Lyrics	Singer(s)	Length
1.	"Not Out Title Track"	Pramod Maravanthe	Vasuki Vaibhav	3:00
2.	"Dukha Dugudagala"	Ambarisha M	Aditi Sagar	3:40
Total length:				6:40

== Release ==
=== Marketing ===
The producers used a strategy to promote the film. The first half of the film was made available to the audience at no cost, while a ticket purchase was required to view the second half. This approach was announced during the trailer launch event and implemented prior to the film's release.

=== Theatrical release ===
The film was released theatrically on 19 July 2024.

=== Critical reception ===
Shashiprasad SM of Times Now rated the film two-and-a-half out of five stars and wrote, "Not Out is another film that tries to rekindle the harsh realities of life in the background of the pandemic. That apart, it hardly offers anything even in terms of entertainment." Jagadish Angadi of Deccan Herald gave it three-and-a-half out of five stars and wrote, "The story is presented as a flashback. In a way, the narrative itself is the protagonist."

Vinay Lokesh of The Times of India gave the film three out of five stars and wrote, "A Compelling Story with the Right Twist". Y. Maheswara Reddy of Bangalore Mirror rated the film three out of five stars and wrote that "It is worth a watch for family audiences."
