= Yogi Duniya =

2018 Kannada-language film

- Official poster
- Directed by: Hari
- Produced by: TP Siddaraju
- Starring: Yogesh; Hitha Chandrashekar
- Edited by: Akshay P Rao
- Music by: Bharath B. J.
- Release date: 23 March 2018
- Country: India
- Language: Kannada

Yogi Duniya is a 2018 Indian Kannada-language drama film directed by Hari and starring Yogesh and Hitha Chandrashekar.

== Cast ==
- Yogesh as Yogi
- Hitha Chandrashekar as Sheela
- Vasishta N. Simha

== Production ==
The film was awarded an 'A' (Adult) certificate. The film was initially titled Duniya 2 although the film had no connection to Duniya (2007). The film highlights cricket betting rackets. The film is set in Majestic in Bangalore.

== Reception ==
A critic from The Times of India wrote that "A simple story line with no frills attached, Yogi Duniya attempts to make you think about life, your choices, your purpose and your destiny. It's worth a trip to the theatre, if you are looking for a wake-up call". A critic from Chitraloka said that "Yogi Duniya is not just any underworld fight fest. It is a film with a heart. It is one of the best roles of his career for Yogesh and one of the better films of the year in Kannada".
