= Thimayya & Thimayya =

2022 family drama film

- Release poster
- Directed by: Sanjay Sharma
- Written by: Thejovrusha (dialogues)
- Story by: Sanjay Sharma
- Produced by: Rajesh Sharma
- Starring: Anant Nag; Diganth
- Cinematography: Balakrishna Thota
- Edited by: Suresh Urs
- Music by: J. Anoop Seelin
- Production company: Garuda Motion Pictures Pvt. Ltd
- Release date: 2 December 2022
- Running time: 150 minutes
- Country: India
- Language: Kannada

Thimayya & Thimayya is a 2022 Indian Kannada-language family drama film directed by Sanjay Sharma and starring Anant Nag and Diganth in the titular roles.

== Cast ==
- Anant Nag as Sr. Thimayya
- Diganth as Jr. Thimayya
- Aindrita Ray as Jyotsana
- Shubra Aiyappa as Soumya
- Vineeth 'Beep' Kumar as Andy
- Prakash Thuminad as Jaganna
- Rukmini Vijayakumar (cameo appearance)

== Production ==
A father and son who reopened a thirty-five year old café in Goa inspired the two lead characters of a grandpa and grandson. The film is set in Coorg and Madikeri.

== Soundtrack ==
The songs were composed by Anoop Seelin. The lyrics were written by Arasu Anthare and Ashok Maddur. The songs were released under the label Anand Audio.

Track listing
No.	Title	Singer(s)	Length
1.	"Freedom"	J. Anoop Seelin	3:04
2.	"Aa Neeli Kaadinda"	J. Anoop Seelin	3:14
3.	"Yaara Pathravidu"	Ankitha Kundu	3:22
4.	"O My Sundara"	Supriyaa Ram, Ananya Bhat	3:41
5.	"Ondalla Saavira"	Ankitha Kundu	2:22
Total length:			15:43

== Reception ==
A critic from The Times of India wrote that "Thimayya and Thimayya are a visual treat. Both Diganth and Anant Nag have performed their roles with ease and won big in emotional scenes". A critic from Bangalore Mirror wrote that "It is worth a watch, if you are a hard core fan of Anant Nag". A critic from The New Indian Express wrote that "To sum it all up, Thimayya & Thimayya is definitely an ideal family watch". A critic from OTT Play wrote that "Thimayya & Thimayya is a feel-good film, and the gut feeling is that it is the kind of movie that audiences would love to see as a lazy Sunday watch, but in the comfort of their homes".
