= Olavina Ole =

- Release poster
- Directed by: Teshi Venkatesh
- Written by: Teshi Venkatesh
- Produced by: Mamatha Venkatesh
- Starring: Santhosh; Neha Patil
- Cinematography: Mahanthesh Maski
- Edited by: B S Kemparaj
- Music by: Yashovardhana
- Release date: 30 November 2012
- Country: India
- Language: Kannada

Olavina Ole is a 2012 Indian Kannada-language romantic drama film directed by Teshi Venkatesh and starring Santhosh and Neha Patil. The film talks about honour killings. Aruna Balraj won the Karnataka State Film Award for Best Supporting Actress for this film.

== Cast ==
- Santhosh as Narasimha
- Neha Patil as Mallige
- Shankar Ashwath as Doddayya
- Aruna Balraj

== Production ==
The film is directed by Teshi Venkatesh, who previously directed the action films Bangalore Bundh and Monda starring Sai Kumar. The film is based on a true incident that happened in the 1990s. To gain publicity for the film, Neha Patil and Teshi Venkatesh tried to create a controversy at the film's press meeting. The film ran into some financial trouble before release.

== Soundtrack ==
The music was composed by Yashovardhana. The songs were released under the label Ashwini Media Networks.

Track listing
No.	Title	Singer(s)	Length
1.	"Amma Ninna Usiridu"	Hemanth	3:46
2.	"Ammanobbale"	Hemanth	5:23
3.	"Entha Saavu"	Badari Prasad	2:10
4.	"Nee Nillada Nade"	Badari Prasad	4:06
5.	"Nodabyada Hanga"	Hemanth, Anuradha Bhat	3:19
6.	"Olavina Ole"	Rajesh Krishnan	5:12
Total length:			23:56

== Reception ==
A critic from The Times of India wrote "An age old theme that doesn't suit the present generation's tastes. Old wine in new bottle". A critic from Bangalore Mirror wrote that "Despite some in-your-face (and ears) mistakes, Olavina Ole is an attempt that deserves appreciation and encouragement. Moreover, audience backing". A critic from IANS wrote that "Director Teshi Venkatesh deserves appreciation for basing his screenplay on the real life incident even when caste conflicts have still not subsided in several places in Karnataka, and only a few honour killing cases are reported".
