= Shraddha Srinath =

Indian actress (born 1990)

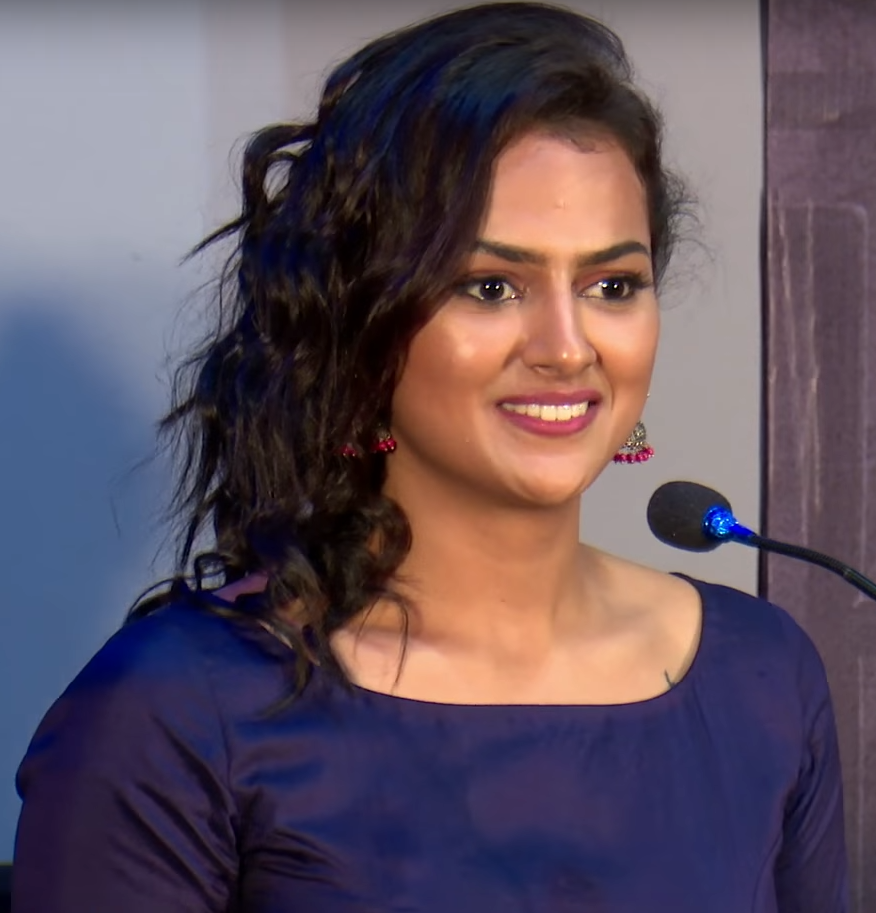
- Shraddha in 2017
- Born: 29 September 1990 (age 36); Udhampur, Jammu & Kashmir, India
- Education: Bangalore Institute of Legal Studies
- Occupation: Actress
- Years active: 2015–present

Shraddha Srinath (born 29 September 1990) is an Indian actress who predominantly appears in Tamil, Kannada, Malayalam and Telugu films. Shraddha is a recipient of several awards including two Filmfare Awards South and two SIIMA Award.

Shraddha made her debut with the Malayalam film Kohinoor (2015) and gained acclaim for her role in the Kannada thriller U Turn (2016), earning the Filmfare Award for Best Actress - Kannada. She went on to establish herself with her performances in Urvi (2017), Vikram Vedha (2017), Operation Alamelamma (2017), Jersey (2019), Nerkonda Paarvai (2019), Chakra (2021), Irugapatru (2023) and Daaku Maharaaj (2025). For Operation Alamelamma, she won the Filmfare Critics Award for Best Actress – Kannada.

== Early life ==
Shraddha was born on 29 September 1990 to a Kannada-speaking family in the town of Udhampur, Jammu & Kashmir. Her father was an officer in the Kumaon Regiment of the Indian Army and her mother was a school teacher. After completing her schooling from the Army School, Secunderabad, Shraddha moved to Bangalore to study law at the Bangalore Institute of Legal Studies.

== Career ==
=== Early work and breakthrough (2015–2019) ===
After graduating from law school, she worked as a real estate lawyer at a Bangalore-based real estate company before joining a French retail company as a real estate legal advisor. While holding a full-time corporate job, she continued acting in plays and appearing in advertisements.

Shraddha was called to play the second female lead in the Malayalam film called Kohinoor, directed by Vinay Govind, which released in September 2015. Her Kannada debut came in 2016 with U Turn which was directed by Pawan Kumar which premiered at the New York Indian Film Festival and was subsequently released in India and worldwide. Shraddha received critical acclaim for playing a journalist and won the Filmfare Award for Best Actress – Kannada. Shyam Prasad S of Bangalore Mirror noted that she gave a "class performance". While Sunayana Suresh stated, "Shraddha is a good find and she is a talent to look out for in the future."

Shraddha started 2017 with the release of Urvi, directed by B. S. Pradeep Varma. She debuted in the Tamil industry with Mani Ratnam's Kaatru Veliyidai. Later she played the female lead in R. Kannan's Ivan Thanthiran opposite Gautham Karthik. In Richie she paired opposite Nivin Pauly, directed by Gautham Ramachandran. Later, she appeared in a song of The Villain, along with Shiva Rajkumar. Shraddha also played a lawyer in Pushkar Gayatri's Vikram Vedha opposite R. Madhavan. It was a box office success and Vikram Venkateswaran of The Quint noted, "Shraddha delivers a brilliant, but undersold performance. She has barely a few scenes to establish her presence." She then appeared in Operation Alamelamma as a teacher opposite Rishi. A Sharadhaa of The New Indian Express stated that she ably supports the flow of the film.

In 2019, her first release was her Bollywood debut with Ali Fazal in Milan Talkies, which is directed by Tigmanshu Dhulia. After Milan Talkies, Shraddha marked her Telugu debut opposite Nani in the sports drama Jersey. She played a working wife of an ex-cricketer and the film was a commercial success. Janani K of India Today stated, "Shraddha Srinath makes a brilliant Telugu debut with Jersey. As Sarah, she is an ever-supporting wife and not the one who will withstand all the troubles caused by her husband." Her next release of the year was her Tamil movie K-13, where she is paired opposite Arulnithi. Her next release of the year was her Kannada movie Rustum, where she is paired opposite Shiva Rajkumar. Her next after Rustum was Nerkonda Paarvai, the Tamil remake of Hindi movie Pink, with Ajith. Her next release of the year was Jodi, where she is paired opposite Aadi Saikumar. In 2020, she appeared in Krishna and His Leela opposite Siddhu Jonnalagadda.

=== Career expansion (2021–present) ===
In 2021, Shraddha appeared in two Tamil films – Maara and Chakra. In 2022, her first release was Mohanlal starrer Malayalam film Aaraattu. She then appeared in Kannada film Dear Vikram opposite Sathish Ninasam and Tamil film Witness. Her only release of 2023 was Irugapatru opposite Vikram Prabhu, a commercial success. In 2024, she first appeared in Saindhav opposite Venkatesh. Her next release came with Mechanic Rocky, where she appeared opposite Vishwak Sen. Aditya Devulapally of The New Indian Express stated, "Shraddha brings depth to an otherwise underwritten role, leaving you wishing for a better backstory."

Shraddha's first release of 2025 came with Daaku Maharaaj, where she played an IAS officer Nandini opposite Bobby Deol. The film was a box office success and became her highest grossing release. BH Harsh of Cinema Express noted, "Shraddha gets an interesting character to play and leaves an impression despite limited screen time." She then appeared in Kaliyugam.

== Media image ==
Shraddha has established herself as a leading actress in Kannada cinema. In the Bangalore Time Most Desirable Women list, she was placed 5th in 2017, 9th in 2018, 28th in 2019, and 16th in 2020.

== Filmography ==
=== Films ===
Key
†	Denotes films that have not yet been released

List of films and roles
Year	Title	Role	Language	Notes	Ref.
2015	Kohinoor	Nancy	Malayalam	Debut film	
2016	U Turn	Rachana	Kannada	Kannada Debut	
2016	Mungaru Male 2	Doctor	Kannada	Cameo appearance	
2017	Urvi	Suzie	Kannada		
2017	Kaatru Veliyidai	Girija Kapoor	Tamil	Tamil Debut	
2017	Ivan Thanthiran	Asha Subramaniam	Tamil	Debut as lead actress in Tamil	
2017	Vikram Vedha	Adv. Priya Vikram	Tamil		
2017	Richie	Megha	Tamil		
2017	Operation Alamelamma	Ananya	Kannada		
2018	The Villain	Herself	Kannada	Special appearance in the song "Bolo Bolo Ramappa"	
2019	Milan Talkies	Maithili / Janak Kumari	Hindi	Hindi Debut	
2019	Jersey	Sarah Fernandes	Telugu	Telugu Debut	
2019	K- 13	Malarvizhi	Tamil		
2019	Rustum	Anjana "Anju"	Kannada		
2019	Nerkonda Paarvai	Meera Krishnan	Tamil		
2019	Jodi	Kanchana Mala	Telugu		
2020	Krishna and His Leela	Sathya Rao	Telugu	released on Netflix	
2021	Maara	Parvathy	Tamil		
2021	Chakra	ACP Gayathri IPS	Tamil		
2022	Aaraattu	RDO Anjali T.R	Malayalam	Debut as lead actress in Malayalam	
2022	Dear Vikram	Nitya	Kannada		
2022	Witness	Parvathy	Tamil		
2023	Irugapatru	Mithra Manohar	Tamil		
2024	Saindhav	Manognya	Telugu		
2024	Mechanic Rocky	Apsara / Maya	Telugu		
2025	Daaku Maharaaj	Nandini Thakur IAS	Telugu		
2025	Kaliyugam	Pari	Tamil	Bilingual film	
2025	Kaliyugam 2064	Bhoomi	Telugu	Bilingual film	
2025	Aaryan	Nayana	Tamil		
2026	Bro Code †	TBA	Tamil	Filming	

=== Television ===
Year	Title	Role	Network	Notes	ref
2025	The Game: You Never Play Alone	Kavya	Netflix	Tamil; Web debut	
2026	Gully		Amazon Prime Video	Telugu; Upcoming	

== Awards and nominations ==
List of awards and nominations
Year	Film	Award	Category	Result	Ref.
2017	U -Turn	64th Filmfare Awards South	Best Actress – Kannada	Won	
2017	U -Turn	6th SIIMA Awards	Best Actress – Kannada	Won	
2017	U -Turn	2nd IIFA Utsavam	Best Actress – Kannada	Won	
2018	Operation Alamelamma	65th Filmfare Awards South	Best Actress – Kannada	Nominated	
2018	Operation Alamelamma	65th Filmfare Awards South	Critics Best Actress – Kannada	Won	
2018	Operation Alamelamma	7th SIIMA Awards	Best Actress – Kannada	Nominated	
2018	Vikram Vedha	7th SIIMA Awards	Best Debutant Actress – Tamil	Nominated	
2018	Vikram Vedha	10th Vijay Awards	Best Actress	Nominated	
2020	Nerkonda Paarvai	Ananda Vikatan Cinema Awards	Best Actress	Nominated	
2020	Jersey	3rd Zee Cine Awards Telugu	Best Actress	Nominated	
2020	Jersey	3rd Zee Cine Awards Telugu	Best Find of the Year - Female	Won	
2020	Jersey	9th SIIMA Awards	Best Actress – Telugu	Nominated	
2022	Chakra & Maara	Santosham Film Awards	Best Actress – Tamil	Won	
2024	Irugapatru	Ananda Vikatan Cinema Awards	Best Actress	Nominated	
2024	Irugapatru	69th Filmfare Awards South	Best Actress – Tamil	Nominated	
2024	Irugapatru	3rd IIFA Utsavam	Best Actress- Tamil	Nominated	
2025	Mechanic Rocky	70th Filmfare Awards South	Best Supporting Actress – Telugu	Nominated	
2026	Daaku Maharaaj	14th South Indian International Movie Awards	Best Supporting Actress – Telugu	Won	
