= Samagama =

Indian Kannada-language romantic drama film

- Directed by: Kasthuri Jagannath
- Written by: Andani Gowda Halahalli (dialogues)
- Screenplay by: Kasthuri Jagannath
- Story by: Andani Gowda Halahalli
- Starring: Vishranth; Vidya
- Cinematography: Suresh Babu
- Edited by: Narahalli Jnanesh
- Music by: Kiran; C. Ashwath
- Production company: Sri Sai Innovators
- Release date: 8 January 2010
- Country: India
- Language: Kannada

Samagama (transl. Marriage) is a 2010 Indian Kannada-language romantic drama film directed by Kasthuri Jagannath and starring Vishranth and Vidya.

== Plot ==
Devu and Srinivasa are business partners-cum-friends. Their respective children Nandini and Jayanth are classmates and their friendship slowly becomes love. However, Nandini has a marriage proposal from a relative to which her parents agree. Nandini is uninterested in arranged marriage. When Jayanth’s parents come to know that their son is in love, his father wants him to stop so that it doesn't ruin his friendship with Devu while his mother supports him. Devu asks Jayanth to convince his daughter for marriage ignoring the fact that they are in love. Whether Jayanth and Nandini's respective parents agree to their marriage forms the rest of the story.

== Cast ==
- Vishranth as Jayanth
- Vidya as Nandini
- Susheel as Nandini's prospective groom
- Ramakrishna as Devu
- Manjunath Hegde as Srinivasa
- Aruna Balraj
- Vijayalakshmi
- Shivaji Rao Jadhav
- Kuri Prathap
- Sunil
- Shailaja
- kumarswamy

== Soundtrack ==
Samagama

Soundtrack album by Kiran and C. Ashwath
- Released: 2010
- Recorded: 2010
- Genre: Feature film soundtrack
- Language: Kannada

The music consists of five songs composed by Kiran and one song composed by C. Ashwath.

Track listing
No.	Title	Lyrics	Music	Singer(s)	Length
1.	"O Nanna Preethiya Geleya"	Subraya Chokkadi	Kiran	K. S. Chithra	4:01
2.	"Ene Mallika"	Dhananjaya Mysore	Kiran	Hemanth	4:26
3.	"Ankura Premankura"	Hrudayashiva	Kiran	Karthik, Anuradha Bhat
4.	"Munisu Tharave Mugude"	Subraya Chokkadi	C. Ashwath	Ajay Warier	5:05
5.	"Saaguthalide Ello Payana"	Jhamakhandi Shivu	Kiran	Anuradha Bhat
6.	"Naa Kaanada Kanase"	Jhamakhandi Shivu	Kiran	Kiran, Shamitha Malnad

== Reception ==
A critic from Deccan Herald wrote that "‘Samagama’ is another film that raises hopes of a better year for the industry. A good time to pay a visit to the nearest theatre". A critic from Bangalore Mirror wrote that "But without the cherry topping this good film may find it hard to pull the audience. It is still one of the best films to be made by a new team in recent years".
