= Badmaash (2016 film) =

- Directed by: Akash Srivatsa
- Written by: Akash Srivatsa
- Screenplay by: Akash Srivatsa; Prashanth; Santhosh
- Produced by: Ravi Kashyap
- Starring: Dhananjay; Sanchita Shetty; Achyuth Kumar
- Cinematography: Shreesha Kuduvalli
- Edited by: Srikanth
- Music by: Judah Sandhy
- Production company: Vibha Kashyap Productions
- Release date: 18 November 2016
- Country: India
- Language: Kannada

Badmaash is a 2016 Indian Kannada-language masala thriller film directed by Akash Srivatsa and produced by Ravi Kashyap. It features Dhananjay and Sanchita Shetty in lead roles besides Achyuth Kumar, Prakash Belawadi, and B. Suresha playing key supporting roles. The film's score and the soundtrack are composed by Judah Sandhy whilst the cinematography is by Shreesha and editing by Srikanth.

== Plot ==
Vijay is a street-smart guy who meets and falls in love with his childhood friend, RJ Priya. Priya reveals that her father, Vikram Prathap Simha, found a red diamond and has decided to hand over it to the Governor. But Rajashekhara alias King, who is the present Home Minister, had learned about the diamond. He kills Vikram and frames him as a traitor after the latter refuses to give the diamond to King. Learning this, Vijay forms a plan and tactfully exposes King with the help of his contacts and King's brother, Guru. Vijay secretly hands over the red diamond to the Governor and proves Vikram's innocence.

== Cast ==
- Dhananjay as Vijay
- Sanchita Shetty as Priya
- Achyuth Kumar as Rajashekhar alias King
- Prakash Belawadi as Royal Kumar
- Ramesh Bhat as Constable Rudrappa
- Suchendra Prasad as Vikram Prathap Simha
- M. S. Umesh
- Surya Vasishta as Dr. Ashok Simha
- Vijanath Biradar
- Jahangir
- Ithi Acharya
- Pannaga Bharana
- B. Suresha as a media baron
- Ramesh Pandit
- Lakshmi Anand
- Ram Manjjonaath
- Bangalore Nagesh
- Nagabhushana as a media reporter
- Valerian Menezes

== Release ==
The film was released on 18 November 2016 across Karnataka. Prior to its release, as a part of the promotion, the team took the traditional way by hiring autorickshaws and with the horn speakers installed on them. A team of college students volunteered themselves to promote the film across 29 districts of Karnataka.

== Soundtrack ==
Badmaash

Soundtrack album by Judah Sandy
- Released: 21 June 2016
- Recorded: 2016
- Genre: Feature film soundtrack
- Length: 30:25
- Label: Anand Audio

Judah Sandy chronology
Lifu Super (2016)	Badmaash (2016)	Operation Alamelamma (2017)

Judah Sandhy has composed the score and soundtrack for the film. The audio was released on 21 June 2016 in Bangalore with six young film directors Pawan Kumar, Pawan Wadeyar, Santhosh Ananddram, S. Krishna, Anup Bhandari, and Chetan Kumar releasing the songs. The soundtrack consists of eight songs and one instrumental track, and the lyrics are penned by Jayanth Kaikini, Yogaraj Bhat, Chetan Kumar, and the director Akash Srivatsa. The song "Hare Rama" sung by Raghu Dixit was released online and comprises 108 different names of Lord Rama.

Soundtrack
No.	Title	Lyrics	Singer(s)	Length
1.	"Bolo Iska Naam"	Akash Srivatsa	Chandan Shetty, Lahari Ramesh	03:40
2.	"Ishta Ishta Aadre"	Chetan Kumar	Tippu	03:07
3.	"Hare Rama"	Akash Srivatsa	Raghu Dixit	02:13
4.	"Maayavi Kanase"	Jayanth Kaikini	Karthik, Shreya Ghoshal	03:46
5.	"Tadkalro"	Yogaraj Bhat	Vijay Prakash	03:43
6.	"Rama Ravivara"	Chetan Kumar	Arjun, Sai Prakash, Tony Thomas	02:22
7.	"Kannalle Savira"	Akash Srivatsa	Lahari Ramesh, Shashank Sheshagiri	03:18
8.	"Maayavi Kanase (Unplugged)"	Jayanth Kaikini	Karthik, Shreya Ghoshal	03:50
9.	"Theme of Badmaash"	Instrumental	Judah Sandhy	02:14
