= Santhosh Balaraj =

Indian actor (1990–2025)

- Born: 31 March 1990; Bangalore, Karnataka, India
- Died: 5 August 2025 (aged 35); Banashankari, Bangaluru, Karnataka, India
- Occupation: Actor
- Years active: 2009–2025

Santhosh Balaraj (31 March 1990 – 5 August 2025) was an Indian actor who predominantly worked on Kannada-language films. The son of producer Anekal Balaraj, Santhosh began his career in the lead role in Kempa. He gained popularity for his performance in the 2015 action thriller Ganapa.

== Career ==
In 2009, he played the lead role in his debut film Kempa, produced by his father Anekal Balaraj. Later films include a family drama titled Olavina Ole in 2012 and action film Janma in 2013. While the former released to mixed reviews, the latter released to positive reviews. In Ganapa, he played an innocent man forced into lawlessness. A critic wrote that "Santhosh, especially, has grown as a performer". His last film, Kariya 2, an action romantic thriller set in the backdrop of a criminal underworld was released in October 2017. The film opened to mixed to positive reviews, and his role as Kariya was well received.

== Personal life ==
He was receiving treatment for jaundice when he fell into a coma at Sagar Apollo Hospital, Bengaluru. His last film Sathyam remains unreleased.

== Filmography ==
Year	Film	Role	Notes
2009	Kempa	Kempa	credited as Santhosh
2012	Olavina Ole	Narasimha	credited as Santhosh
2013	Janma	Kanteerava	credited as Santhosh
2015	Ganapa	Ganapa	
2017	Kariya 2	Kariya	
