= Hitha Chandrashekar =

Indian actress

- Born: 15 December 1991; Bangalore, Karnataka, India
- Occupation: Actress
- Years active: 2017–present
- Spouse: Kiran Srinivas (m. 2019)
- Parent(s): Sihi Kahi Chandru; Sihi Kahi Geetha

Hitha Chandrashekhar is an Indian actress who works in Kannada films. She made her debut in 2016 with Kannada Film Kempammana Court Case.

== Career ==
Hitha completed an acting course from Roshan Taneja School of Acting in Mumbai before making her film debut in 2016 with Kempammana Court Case in a small role. Her next film in 2017 with 1/4 Kg Preethi opposite Vihan Gowda was successful. In 2016, she participated in the reality television show Dancing Star where she won the title which was aired on Colors Kannada. She was then seen in Yogi Duniya (2018) opposite Yogesh, and Onthara Bannagalu (2018) starring Kiran Srinivas and Sonu Gowda. Her next film was Premier Padmini (2019) directed by debutant Ramesh Indira. The film received positive reviews and went on to become a huge success at the box office. Her next release was a short film "Kaaji" directed by Actress Aishani Shetty backed by Sathish Ninasam which went to win multiple awards.

Hitha then went on to make her Bollywood debut with the film Silence... Can you hear it? (2021) starring Manoj Bajpayee, which opened to positive-to-mixed reviews. Her first release of 2022 was Thurthu Nirgamana directed by debutant Hemant Kumar which opened to positive reviews and went on to become a success on OTT. In 2024, She played the role of protagonist's sister in Yuva produced by Hombale Films which opened to positive-to-mixed reviews but her role was appreciated.

== Personal life ==
Hitha was born to actors Sihi Kahi Chandru and Sihi Kahi Geetha in Bangalore. She has a younger sister. Hitha met actor Kiran Srinivas during the shoot of a film. The two got engaged in August 2019 before marrying on 2 December that year.

== Filmography ==
=== Films ===
Key
| † | Denotes films that have not yet been released |

- All films are in Kannada language, unless otherwise noted

| Year | Title | Role | Notes | Ref |
|---|---|---|---|---|
| 2016 | Kempammana Court Case | | | |
| 2017 | 1/4 Kg Preethi | Sri | | |
| 2018 | Onthara Bannagalu | Hitha | | |
| 2018 | Yogi Duniya | Sheela | | |
| 2019 | Premier Padmini | Ranjani | | |
| 2021 | Silence... Can You Hear It? | Kavita Khanna | Hindi film | |
| 2022 | Thurthu Nirgamana | Mili Sebastian | | |
| 2022 | Shubhamangala | Vidhya | | |
| 2024 | Yuva | Shwetha | SIIMA Award for Best Actress in a Supporting Role (Kannada) | |

=== Short films ===
| Year | Title | Role | Language | Notes | Ref |
|---|---|---|---|---|---|
| 2019 | Kaaji | Lakshmi | Kannada | Best Actress - SIIMA Short Film Awards | |

=== Television / Series ===
| Year | Show | Role | Notes | Channel | Ref |
|---|---|---|---|---|---|
| 2016 | Dancing Star | NA | Season 3; Winner | Colors Kannada | |
| 2022 | Nammane Yuvarani | Herself | Cameo | Colors Kannada | |
| 2023 | Scam 2003 | Radha (Karnataka SIT) | | SonyLiv | |
| 2025 | Ayyana Mane | Pushpavthi | | ZEE5 | |
