= Ganapa =

2015 film directed by Prabhu Srinivas

- Directed by: Prabhu Srinivas
- Written by: Prabhu Srinivas
- Story by: Prabhu Srinivas
- Produced by: Paramesh; Premkumar
- Starring: Santhosh Balaraj; Priyanka Thimmesh
- Cinematography: Srinivas Devamsam
- Edited by: Jo Ni Harsha
- Music by: Karan B. Krupa
- Production company: P2 Productions
- Distributed by: Jayanna Films
- Release date: 26 June 2015
- Running time: 112 minutes
- Country: India
- Language: Kannada

Ganapa is a 2015 Indian Kannada-language gangster film, written and directed by Prabhu Srinivas. It stars Santhosh Balaraj and Priyanka Thimmesh. The movie is a remake of Jeet starrer 2006 film Kranti. It has been dubbed by Pen Movies in Hindi as Daada Ka Vaada.

== Cast ==
- Santhosh Balaraj as Ganapa
- Priyanka Thimmesh as Brunda
- Tharun Master as Jayanna
- Kalyan Master as Suresh aka Uncle
- Tumkur Mohan as Muttanna
- Petrol Prasanna as Madesha
- Manjunath Gowda as Muttanna's son
- Sunetra Pandit as Muttanna's wife
- Padmaja Rao as Brunda's mother
- Devadarshini
- Ranjitha

== Soundtrack ==
Ganapa

Soundtrack album by Karan B.Krupa
- Released: 2014
- Recorded: 2014
- Genre: Feature film soundtrack
- Length: 18.38
- Label: Anand Audio

Music by Karan B. Krupa. Sonu Nigam sung the song "Muddagi Neenu", penned by Jayant Kaikini, that became one of the top ten Kannada songs of the year.

No.	Title	Lyrics	Singer(s)	Length
1.	"Muddagi Neenu"	Jayant Kaikini	Sonu Nigam	4:31
2.	"Hosadaada Kanasondu"	Hrudaya Shiva	Anuradha Bhat	4:31
3.	"Yaarivalu Yaarivalu"	Chinmaya	Vijay Prakash	5:24
4.	"Manglaarthi Madabyadri"	Shivu Bhergi	Chaitra H. G.	4:12
