= Prayag Mukundan =

Indian cinematographer

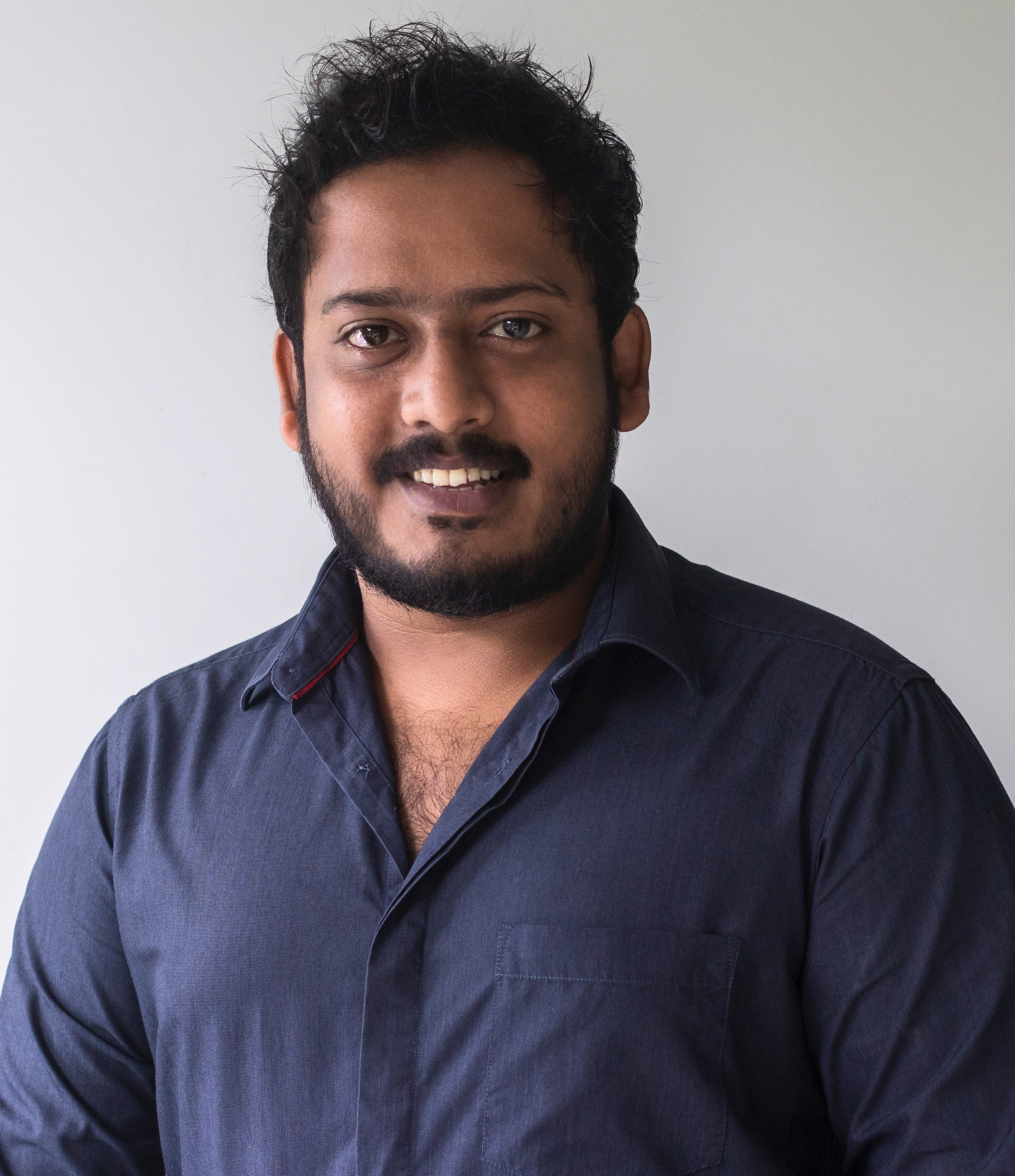
- Born: Prayag Mukundan; 1991 (age 34–35) kannur, Kerala, India
- Occupation: Cinematographer
- Years active: 2010–present
- Parent(s): M.V Mukundan & Prasanna M.M
- Awards: Kedamangalam Sadanandan memorial award for Best Cinematographer-2013
- Website: www.prayagmukundan.com

Prayag Mukundan is an Indian cinematographer working predominantly in Malayalam, Kannada and Hindi film industries. With an educational background in VFX and Animation filmmaking and cinematography, he received mentorship from VFX director Biju Dhanapalan and cinematographers like C. K. Muraleedharan, Sujith Vaassudev and Sudheer Palsane. Prayag's early body of work includes documentaries, advertisements, short films and government projects, including research collaborations with IIT Bombay He made his feature film debut as Director of photography with the Kannada film Thurthu Nirgamana (Emergency Exit).

== Filmography ==
Year	Title	Role	Notes
2013	Punyalan Agarbattis	Assistant Camera	Second Camera Operator
2014	PK	Camera Intern	
2015	Anischit (Short)	Assistant Camera	
2016	School Bus	Assistant Camera	
2017	Baale (Short)	Cinematographer	
2019	Killimangalam Vazhi (Documentary)	Cinematographer	Won Kerala Kalamandalam Award
2020	Pottakinar (Short)	Cinematographer	
2020	Saakshaathkaram (Short)	Cinematographer	Won the best short fiction film in the international competition of MIFF 2020
2022	Thurthu Nirgamana (Kannada Debut)	Cinematographer	Kannada Debut
2023	Penmudra (Documentary)	Cinematographer	
2025	Sangharsha Ghadana: The Art of Warfare	Director of Photography	
2026	Masthishka Maranam †	Director of Photography	
