= Rudra Garuda Purana =

2025 Kannada-language film

- Theatrical release poster
- Directed by: K. S. Nandeesh
- Written by: K. S. Nandeesh
- Produced by: Ashwini Lohith
- Starring: Rishi; Priyanka Kumar; Vinod Alva
- Cinematography: Sandeep Kumar
- Edited by: K. M. Prakash
- Music by: Krishna Prasad
- Production company: Ashwini Arts
- Release date: 24 January 2025
- Country: India
- Language: Kannada

Rudra Garuda Purana is a 2025 Indian Kannada-language mystery thriller film directed by K. S. Nandeesh and produced by Ashwini Lohith under the Ashwini Arts banner. The film stars Rishi and Priyanka Kumar in lead roles, alongside Vinod Alva, Avinash, Prabhakar, Shivaraj KR Pete, Ashwini Gouda, among others. The film's plot is loosely inspired by Pan Am Flight 914, an urban legend about the Douglas DC-4 which disappeared after a takeoff in 1955 and only landed again three decades later. The concept was also based on the Chinese folklore Bus Route 375.

Originally slated for release on 27 December 2024, the film's release was rescheduled to 24 January 2025.

== Premises ==
The story delves into the mystery of a bus accident that occurred 25 years ago, claiming the lives of all its passengers. In a shocking twist, the same bus and its passengers reappear years later, sparking an intense investigation. The bus named "17A Kaveri Express" forms the center character in the plot.

== Cast ==
- Rishi as Inspector Rudra
- Priyanka Kumar
- Vinod Alva
- Avinash
- Shivaraj KR Pete
- Giri Shivanna
- K. S. Shridhar
- Ashwini Gouda
- Ram Pavan
- Vamshi
- Aakarsh
- Gautham Mysuru
- Joseph
- Prabhakar
- Sneek Shyam
- Jagappa
- Prasanna Handrang
- Radvi
- Ranganath Bharadwaj

== Production ==
The film was shot in Mysore and Bangalore and took a total of 70 days to complete the shoot. The climax fight was shot in HMT Limited factory premises.

== Soundtrack ==
Rudra Garuda Purana

Soundtrack album by Krishna Prasaad
- Genre: Feature film soundtrack
- Language: Kannada
- Label: Ashwini Arts
- Producer: Krishna Prasaad

Track listing
No.	Title	Lyrics	Singer(s)	Length
1.	"Kann Munde Bandu"	Chinmay Bhavikerie	Shweta Mohan, Kapil Kapilan	3:11
2.	"Hukka Elli"	Manju Mandavya	Naveen Sajju	3:28
3.	"Investigation Song (Title track)"	Kinnal Raj	Nakul Abhyankar	3:07

== Release ==
The film's release date was initially announced at a song release event by the cast and crew as 27 December 2024. Later, it was postponed to 24 January 2025. The makers announced that the film would release simultaneously in Kannada and Telugu languages and subsequently release in other languages although only the Kannada version was released.

== Reception ==
The movie has received mixed reviews from critics: Sridevi S of The Times of India wrote that the film attempts to merge mythology with a modern thriller but stumbles due to uneven pacing. She praised Rishi's performance as a highlight, though she noted the screenplay lacks consistency. Vivek M.V of The Hindu said the film is a tepid thriller, commending Rishi's dedicated performance but criticizing the weak plot and lack of narrative coherence, which fails to sustain suspense. Shashiprsad SM of Times Now wrote that the film is "mysteriously entertaining but only in parts," appreciating its visual appeal but pointing out disjointed storytelling and shallow character development. A Sharadhaa of The New Indian Express said the film is a riveting tale of justice and karma, with Rishi delivering a standout performance. She appreciated the thematic depth but mentioned minor pacing issues. Y Maheswara Reddy of Bangalore Mirror wrote that the film offers a thrilling take on karma, with Rishi's intense acting standing out. He noted that the film's ambition occasionally overshadows its execution. Shilpa D of Kannada Prabha said the film weaves an engaging narrative around justice and karma, with Rishi's performance being a major strength. She suggested some plot points could have been tighter. S Vishwanath of Deccan Herald wrote that the film's mystery-thriller premise is undermined by a convoluted plot. He acknowledged competent performances but criticized the lack of narrative clarity.
