= Harishchandra (1951 film) =

1951 film by Sangh Rathi

Harishchandra (also listed as Satya Harischandra) is a 1951 Indian Nepali-language film based on the story of the legendary king Harischandra from Hindu mythology. It was directed by Sangh Rathi and produced by T. P. Chaurasia and S. P. Mookherji under the "Bihar National Movietone" banner on the initiative of D. B. Pariyar in Kolkata and Darjeeling, India. It is the first Nepali-language film, the first Nepali-language film made in Nepal being Aama, which released in 1964 and was produced by the Nepalese government.

It was Pariyar's initiative that made it possible for the Nepali-language to be a part of the big screen for the first time. Since it was more crucial to take Nepali language to cinema at that time, Nepali speakers involved in making it happen were more focused only on the language aspect of it, as a result correct credits and other technical aspects with historical significance were overlooked. The film is considered to be lost, only a poster that surfaced in 2015 testifying to its existence.

== Cast ==
- Prem Nazir as Harishchandra
- Chandra Kanta as Taramati
- Sheela Devi as Menaka
- B. B. Pariyar as Rishi Vishwamitra
