= Godha =

Jain caste people found in the state of Gujarat, India

- Religions: Jainism
- Languages: Hindi, Marwari
- Populated states: Surat, Valsad, Rajasthan

The Godha are Jain tribal caste people found in the state of Gujarat in India having roots in Rajasthan. They are also known as Gondha and Gonda. The Godha sometimes (depending on region) use Dengar as a community surname.

== History and origin ==
The Godha are descended from a group of tribal Gondi people that migrated from Madhya Pradesh some five centuries ago. They are mainly distributed in Surat, Valsad and Rajasthan.

== Present circumstances ==
The Godha practice community endogamy. They have no system of clans, or clan hierarchy. They are present in almost every sector now. Many are now involved in a number of occupations such tailoring, and the diamond cutting industry, among others.

== See also ==
- Gond
