= Aruna Balraj =

Indian film actress

- Occupation: Actress
- Years active: 2004–present

Aruna Balaraj is an Indian actress in the Kannada film industry. Some of the notable films of Aruna Balraj as an actress include Naayi Neralu (2006), Ambari (2009), Raja Huli (2013) and Gubbi Mele Bramhastra (2019).

== Career ==
Aruna Balraj has been a part of more than 100 films in Kannada.

== Filmography ==
Year	Movies	Role	Notes
2004	Bisi Bisi		
2006	Naayi Neralu		
2007	Naanu Neenu Jodi		
2008	Moggina Jade		
2008	Gaja		
2009	Ambari	Saro's mother	
2009	Bagi		
2009	Circus	Dhanush's mother	
2010	Samagama		
2010	Naanu Nanna Kanasu	School principal	
2010	Gandedhe		
2010	Kiccha Huccha		
2011	Kote		
2012	Chingari		
2012	Olavina Ole		
2012	Thalana		
2013	Jiddi		
2013	Bangari		
2013	Ambara		
2013	Raja Huli	Rajahuli's Mother	
2013	Chitramandiradali		
2013	Dil Kush		
2014	Mr. and Mrs. Ramachari	Ramachari's mother	
2014	Rose		
2014	Usirigintha		
2014	Churu Kumara		
2017	Operation Alamelamma	Alamelamma	
2017	Raajakumara		
2017	Smile Please	Gauri	
2017	Athiratha		
2018	Ramadhanya		
2018	Trunk		
2018	Katheyondu Shuruvagide	Radha	
2018	Vaasu Naan Pakka Commercial		
2018	Rajaratha	Abhi-Vishwas's Mother	
2018	Ayogya	Bhagyamma	
2018	Iruvudellava Bittu	Poorvi's mother	
2018	Naduve Antaravirali		
2019	Birbal Trilogy Case 1: Finding Vajramuni	Sumitra	
2019	Lambodara	Lambodara's mother	
2019	Sinnga		
2019	Vishnu Circle	Pramila	
2019	Gubbi Mele Brahmastra	Rukmini Gubbi	
2020	Maduve Madri Sari Hogtane		
2020	Gentleman	Tapasswini's mother	
2021	Yuvarathnaa		
2021	Kalavida		
2021	Ninna Sanihake		
2022	Coffee with Kadhal		
2022	Shokiwala	Tayavva	
2022	Hope		
2022	Dear Sathya		
2022	Thurthu Nirgamana	Vikram's Mother	
2022	One Cut Two Cut	Hindi Teacher	
2022	Old Monk	Appanna's mother	
2022	Critical Keerthanegalu		
2022	Shubhamangala		
2023	Chow Chow Bath	Sunitha	
2024	Ondu Sarala Prema Kathe	Athishay's Mother	
2024	O2		
2024	Pepe	Sunitha	
2025	Andondittu Kaala	Kumara's mother	

== Awards ==
Year	Award	Film	Category	Result
2012	Karnataka State Film Awards	Olavina Ole	Best Supporting Actress	Won
2017	Filmfare Awards South	Operation Alamelamma	Best Supporting Actress	Won

== See also ==
- List of people from Karnataka
- Cinema of Karnataka
- List of Indian film actresses
