= Chamak (film) =

- Film poster
- Directed by: Suni
- Written by: Suni; Abhishek Savalagi; Venkatesh Sharma
- Produced by: T. R. Chandrashekar
- Starring: Ganesh; Rashmika Mandanna
- Cinematography: Santhosh Rai Pathaje
- Edited by: Manu Shedgar
- Music by: Judah Sandhy
- Production company: Crystal Park Cinemas
- Release date: 29 December 2017
- Running time: 155 minutes
- Country: India
- Language: Kannada
- Box office: ₹10 crore

Chamak ( stylized #Chamak) is a 2017 Indian Kannada-language romantic comedy film written and directed by Suni and produced by T. R. Chandrashekar. The film stars Ganesh as Kush, a gynaecologist and Rashmika Mandanna as Kushi, an MBA graduate event organizer. The soundtrack and score is by Judah Sandhy and the cinematography is by Santhosh Rai Pathaje.

== Plot ==
Dr. Kush, a gynecologist is a man who likes to chill with his friends. He fears, marrying someone would make him compromise his freedom. Gaining advice from one of his friends, he agrees to pretend to be innocent and marries a docile, pretty, traditional looking girl, Kushi. Later he learns that Kushi is just like him. She gets angry too, she married him for the same reason too: that he looked innocent and she would not have to compromise her freedom. They both apply for a divorce but decide to stay together so their families wouldn't find out. They become good friends and later it turns to love. On Kushi's birthday Kush wishes her and gifts her a trip to the sea (maybe Goa), there they confess their love to each other while being drunk. Before confessing their love they were sanctioned a divorce by the Court. But after that Kushi learned that she was pregnant (maybe because of the sex they had on their first night...or subsequent ones). She decides to keep her baby because she loves Kush but she runs away to not let him know and to protect the baby from her family's disapproval. That's when we see a complete transformation in Kushi's character, who moves out alone just to save her child calling it the most precious thing. She returns when she reaches her seventh month. Kush meanwhile takes up a transfer to Italy to escape his broken heart and to take some time off. Later when he comes to see her, due to a misunderstanding deliberately done by her uncle, he leaves more brokenhearted due to the table death of his patient's child due to pregnancy complications and thinking that Kushi won't be with him.

A few weeks pass and Kushi goes into labour at the same hospital Kush enters due to his car accident. While he was being treated, the nurse informs him that a pregnant patient is in critical condition and there is no surgeon available. Kush agrees to do it without knowing it is Kushi in the OR. He meets his in-laws who explain everything. He helps Kushi deliver their child. The epilogue is their child grown up (Charitrya's debut) and shows them all living happily.

== Cast ==
- Ganesh as Kush
- Rashmika Mandanna as Kushi
- Sadhu Kokila
- Raghuram D. P.
- Sumithra
- Vanishree
- Sheelam M Swamy
- Hampakumar Angadi
- Charitrya Ganesh
- Pradeep Doddaiah
- Raj Surya as Sunni (friend)

== Production ==
The project marks the first in the combination of Suni and Ganesh. The project also marks the debut of Ganesh's daughter Charithriya. The filming began on 14 April 2017 in Bengaluru. Further, between 24 and 27 May, a Holi game sequence was shot inviting youngsters to participate in the shoot. The shooting of songs was held at Italy.

== Soundtrack ==
Chamak

Soundtrack album by Judah Sandy
- Released: 6 December 2017
- Recorded: 2017
- Genre: Feature film soundtrack
- Length: 17:32
- Label: Crystal Music in association with Divo
- Producer: Judah Sandhy

Judah Sandy chronology
Operation Alamelamma (2017)	Chamak (2017)	Idam Premam Jeevanam (2018)

Judah Sandy has composed 5 songs.

Track list
No.	Title	Lyrics	Singer(s)	Length
1.	"Kush Kush"	Vishwa Vijeth	Sanjith Hegde and Deeksha Ramakrishnan	3:58
2.	"Nee Nanna Olavu"	Arjun Luis	Abhinandan Mahishale and Supriya Lohith	3:76
3.	"Avalakki Buvalakki"	Dheeraj Shetty	Chethan Naik & Eesha Suchi	3:06
4.	"O Sanjeya Hoove"	Vishwajith	Haricharan and Priya Himesh	3:15
5.	"O Sanjeya Hoove(Acoustic Version)"	Vishwajith	Narayan Sharma and Sparsha R.K	3:75
Total length:				17:30
