= Operation Alamelamma =

2017 Kannada film directed by Simple Suni

- Theatrical Poster
- Directed by: Suni
- Written by: Suni
- Produced by: Amrej Suryavanshi; Suni
- Starring: Rishi; Shraddha Srinath; Rajesh Nataranga
- Cinematography: Abhishek Kasargod
- Edited by: Sachin B. Ravi
- Music by: Judah Sandhy
- Production companies: Suni Cinemas; StarFab
- Distributed by: Hombale Films; Sandalwood Geleyara Balaga
- Release date: 21 July 2017
- Country: India
- Language: Kannada

Operation Alamelamma is a 2017 Indian Kannada crime comedy thriller film directed by Simple Suni produced by Amrej Suryavanshi and Suni under production Starfab and Suni cinemas The film features Rishi, Shraddha Srinath and Rajesh Nataranga in the lead roles. The film's score and soundtrack is composed by Judah Sandhy whilst the cinematography is by Abhishek Kasargod and editing by Sachin.

Operation Alamelamma is Suni's first attempt at a thriller and based on a kidnapping. The director gives us a glimpse of the teaser and explains, "The hero who is a vegetable vendor has this craze for bidding. He is also fascinated by big brands, but flaunts around fake brand clothing. His craze for brands traps him in a crime situation. Usually a movie plot revolves around a boy chasing after a girl, but here the hero is on a pursuit to find his parents as he is an orphan".

The movie was successful at the box office and ran for over 50 days in theatres. The movies was dubbed into Hindi and Telugu.

== Plot ==
The movie opens with the kidnapping of a boy, and how a seemingly innocent young man, Paramesh, gets entangled in the case. Paramesh aka Purmy (Rishi) is an orphan working as an auctioneer at the vegetable market. His passion for branded articles makes him go for heavily discounted stuff. On one such occasion, he comes across Ms. Ananya (Shraddha), a school teacher who steals a dress from the store. He blackmails her to buy him coffee which leads on to romance developing between them. Meanwhile, Ananya's sick mother sets her up with a well to do groom. The plot revolves around how Purmy aids the police in their investigation intertwined with a past timeline of how he manages his love life.

== Cast ==
- Rishi as Paramesh "Parmy", vegetable auctioneer
- Shraddha Srinath as Ananya, school teacher
- Rajesh Nataranga as Inspector Ashok Kumar K.
- Aruna Balraj as Alamelamma, Ananya's mother
- Sheelam M Swamy as Rahul
- Vishwa Vijeth as Inspector Harish
- Dheeraj Shetty
- Pranaya Murthy as Ranganna
- Sumukha Bharadwaj as John
- Karthik Rao Kordale as Constable Keshava Poojary
- Pramod Jaya
- Amrej Suryavanshi as person in mall (cameo; uncredited)

== Production ==
In August 2016, Suni announced his next film as Operation Alamelamma.

== Marketing ==
On 9 December 2016, the film's teaser was released with a unique concept. The teaser was launched by a vegetable vendor at Rajajinagar market as the lead character in the film is a vegetable vendor.

== Soundtrack ==
Operation Alamelamma

Soundtrack album by Judah Sandhy
- Released: 2017
- Recorded: 2017
- Genre: Feature film soundtrack
- Length: 10:11
- Label: Divo

Judah Sandhy chronology
Badmaash (2016)	''Operation Alamelamma'' (2017)	Chamak (2017)

Judah Sandhy who previously scored for Badmaash (2016), composed the film's background and scored for its soundtrack. The soundtrack album consists of two tracks, including one theme song.

Track listing
No.	Title	Lyrics	Artist(s)	Length
1.	"Alaga Alaga"	K. B. Pavan	Abhinandan Mahishale, Judah Sandhy, Shreya Sundar Iyer	3:58
2.	"Tili Sanje"	Nagarjun Sharma	Preethi Bharadwaj	3:29
3.	"Operation Alamelamma Title Track"	Simple Suni	Judah Sandhy	3:00

== Reception ==
=== Critical response ===
Shashiprasad S.M from Deccan Chronicle says "The rest of the operation runs nearly perfect keeping the audience guessing about the real kidnapper. It's neat, lovable, laughable and few tit bits of emotional sentiments make the operation a great success, and the patient is definitely cured of boredom for a great two plus hours of simple fun & entertainment". Shyam Prasad S from Bangalore Mirror wrote "Operation Alamelamma is not a routine Sandalwood film. But compared to the other new-generation films, falls short of expectations". Nelki Naresh Kumar from Hindustan Times wrote "The love story has been stretched to a great extent. The scenes where Paramesh wins Ananya's heart again after the engagement is over are silly. Police investigation goes beyond logic".
