= Rishi (Kannada actor) =

Indian Kannada actor

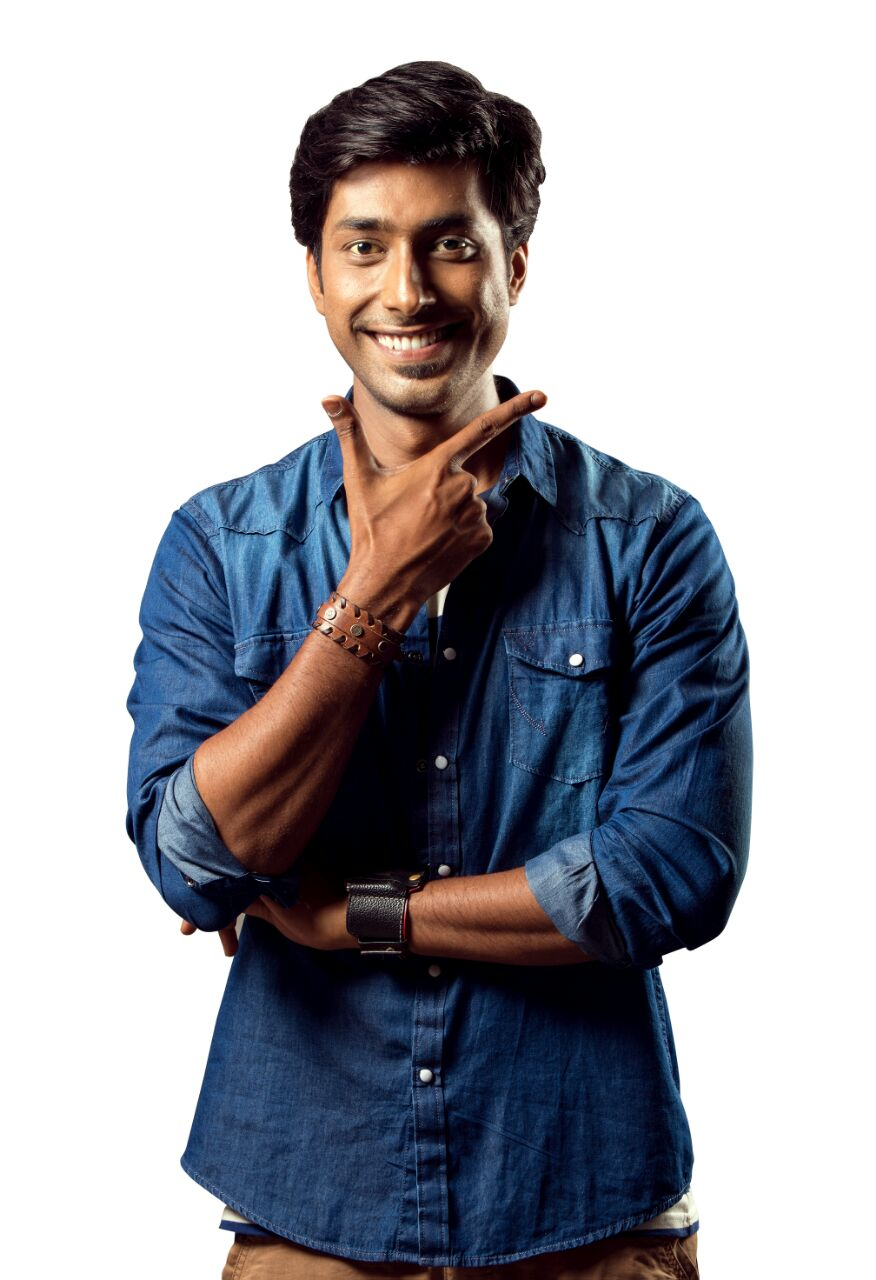
- Rishi at Operation Alamelamma (2017) success press meet
- Born: Monish Nagaraj; 21 June 1988 (age 37); Bangalore, Karnataka, India
- Occupation: Actor
- Years active: 2014–present
- Spouse: Swathi Parasuraman (m. 2019)
- Relatives: RJ Nethra (sister)

Monish Nagaraj, known by his screen name Rishi, is an Indian actor, who works mainly in Kannada cinema. An engineering graduate, he was an active theatre artist before venturing into the Kannada film industry. He rose to fame with the 2017 blockbuster film Operation Alamelamma.

== Early life and education ==
Rishi was born in Bangalore and brought up in Mysore, Karnataka. His father K. C. Nagaraj was a bank official working in Kaveri Grameena Bank and his mother Anala Nagaraj, is a home maker. His birth name is Monish Nagaraj. He did his schooling from St Joseph's Primary School, Mysore and Pre - University course from Marimallappa 's College, Mysore. He went on to attend Sri Jayachamarajendra College of Engineering, Mysore, pursuing a Bachelor’s in Civil Engineering.

During his engineering days, Rishi developed a keen interest in acting and started performing with various amateur theatre groups in Mysore. He was in charge of the dramatics team at his college and also worked as a Radio Jockey outside.

== Career ==
Through campus placement upon graduation, Rishi got a job in a company and entered a brief corporate stint. Following this, he quit his job to become an entrepreneur in the retail interiors and merchandising field.

He then got an opportunity to appear in T. N. Seetharam's Mahaparva. Rishi continued to perform with established theatre groups in Bangalore until he got an opportunity to appear in a television daily, Anuroopa, which was telecast on Star Suvarna. His character portrayal in the serial won him Best Actor consecutively for two years at the Star Suvarna Parivar awards.

=== Debut and recognition ===
In 2016, director Suni of Simple Agi Ondh Love Story fame cast Rishi for his thriller comedy film Operation Alamelamma. The film became one of the major blockbuster hits of 2017, also releasing in countries like USA and Europe. Rishi gained wide acclaim for his debut lead role of Purmy, a vegetable vendor. His next release was in 2019 named Kavaludaari which was directed by Hemanth Rao of Godhi Banna Sadharna Maykattu fame and produced by Puneeth Rajkumar under his production house PRK Productions. The film became a blockbuster hit and Rishi gained huge appreciation for his role as Inspector K.S.Shyam from both critics and as well as by audience.

Rishi has finished shooting for Sakalakala Vallabha which is being directed and co produced by Jacob Verghese along with Tamil actor and producer Dhanush. He is also acting in Sarvajanikarige Suvarnavakaasha and Ramana avatara

== Filmography ==
=== Films ===
Key
†	Denotes films that have not yet been released

Year	Film	Role	Notes	Ref.
2013	Money Honey Shani	Shekar	Credit as Monish Nagaraj	
2014	KA	Charle		
2015	Aatagara	Siddharth Mayya	Cameo appearance	
2017	Operation Alamelamma	Paramesh "Purmy"	Debut as lead actor	
2019	Kavaludaari	Shyam		
2019	Sarvajanikarige Suvarnavakasha	Vedanth		
2021	Mugilpete	Gowtham	Cameo appearance	
2022	One Cut Two Cut	Groom	Cameo appearance	
2022	Nodi Swamy Ivanu Irode Heege	Sai		
2022	Thurthu Nirgamana	Actor Vikram	Cameo appearance	
2024	Ramana Avatara	Rama		
2025	Daaku Maharaaj	Bablu Singh Thakur	Telugu film	
2025	Rudra Garuda Purana	Inspector Rudra		
2025	Sakalakala Vallabha †	TBA	Post-production	
2025	Seere†	TBA	Filming	

=== Television ===
Year	Title	Role	Television	Notes
2014	Mahaparva		ETV Kannada	
2016	Anuroopa	Rishi	Star Suvarna	Credited as Rishi
2023	Shaitan	Bali	Disney+Hotstar	Telugu web series

== Awards ==
Year	Film	Award	Category	Result	Ref
2018	Operation Alamelamma	7th SIIMA Awards	Best Debut Actor	Won	
2020	Kavaludaari	Critics Choice Awards 2020	Best Actor - Kannada	Won	
2021	Kavaludaari	9th SIIMA Awards	Best Actor	Nominated	
