= Nemichand Jhabak =

Indian film production company

- Type: Film production Film distribution
- Industry: Entertainment
- Headquarters: Chennai, India
- Key people: Nemichand Jhabak; V. Hitesh Jhabak
- Products: Motion pictures (Tamil)

Nemichand Jhabak is an Indian film production and distribution company headed by Nemichand Jhabak and V. Hitesh Jhabak.

== History ==
Producer V. Hitesh Jhabak's father, Vazeer Chand Jhabak, owned the negative rights for several Tamil classic films.

The Jhabaks made their production debut with Naan Avanillai (2007), a remake of the yesteryear film. The film was a success, as was the studio's second film, Anjathe (2008) by Mysskin. However, their following films Pandi, Pokkisham and Pandhayam, which was distributed by them.He also produced Mappillai. Likewise, after the failure of Vanmam (2014), Hitesh Jhabak publicly thanked actor Arya for forgoing his payment for his work in Meaghamann (2014) to ensure the film was released. In 2015, producer Nemichand Jhabak spoke out against the rising costs of film production and the unfavourable conditions requested by actors. Including their first film, they have made ten films in a decade, with the most recent being the first Indian space film, Tik Tik Tik (2018) starring Jayam Ravi and Nivetha Pethuraj.

== Filmography ==
Production

Title	Year	Director	Cast	Synopsis	Ref.
Naan Avanillai	2007	Selva	Jeevan, Sneha, Namitha, Malavika	Four women search for a man they believe has swindled them.	
Anjathe	2008	Mysskin	Narain, Prasanna, Ajmal, Vijayalakshmi	Two friends become enemies when one becomes a policeman using political influence.	
Pandi	2008	Rasu Madhuravan	Raghava Lawrence, Sneha, Namitha	A man finds work abroad in order to earn enough to support his family. Upon his return, he learns that his mother is dead, so he sets out to find her killer.	
Pokkisham	2009	Cheran	Cheran, Padmapriya, Aryan Rajesh	Set in the 1970s, a young Hindu boy working in Kolkata falls in love with Muslim girl in Nagore in Tamil Nadu.	
Naan Avanillai 2	2009	Selva	Jeevan, Sangeetha, Lakshmi Rai	Four women search for a man they believe has swindled them.	
Mappillai	2011	Suraj	Dhanush, Hansika Motwani, Manisha Koirala	A young man's mother-in-law keeps interfering in his marriage to her daughter.	
Vanmam	2014	Jai Krishna	Vijay Sethupathi, Kreshna, Sunaina	The friendship of two rural young men faces a challenge when a fight ends in tragedy.	
Meaghamann	2014	Magizh Thirumeni	Arya, Hansika Motwani, Ashutosh Rana	An undercover police officer who infiltrates the gang of drug lord, tasked with bringing the boss and the entire cartel to justice.	
Dora	2017	Doss Ramasamy	Nayanthara, Thambi Ramaiah, Harish Uthaman	A young woman and her father start up a cab company but find the first car they buy is haunted by the victims of a murder for which the perpetrators have not been brought to justice.	
Tik Tik Tik	2018	Shakti Soundar Rajan	Jayam Ravi, Nivetha Pethuraj, Aaron Aziz		
Pon Manickavel	2021	A. C. Mugil Chellappan	Prabhu Deva, Nivetha Pethuraj Mahendran, Suresh Chandra Menon		

Distribution

- Pandhayam (2008)
- Podaa Podi (2012)
