= Drishya =

- Theatrical release poster
- Directed by: P. Vasu
- Written by: P. Vasu
- Story by: Jeethu Joseph
- Based on: Drishyam by Jeethu Joseph
- Produced by: Mukesh R. Mehta
- Starring: Ravichandran; Navya Nair; Swaroopinii; Unnathi; Asha Sharath; Prabhu
- Cinematography: Madhu Neelakandan
- Edited by: Suresh Urs
- Music by: Ilaiyaraaja
- Production company: E4 Entertainment
- Distributed by: E4 Entertainment
- Release date: 20 June 2014
- Running time: 154 minutes
- Country: India
- Language: Kannada

Drishya (transl. Visual) is a 2014 Indian Kannada-language crime drama film directed by P. Vasu and produced by E4 Entertainment. It is a remake of the 2013 Malayalam film Drishyam and stars V. Ravichandran, Navya Nair, Swaroopinii, Unnathi, Asha Sharath, Prabhu, and Achyuth Kumar, The film's music was composed by Ilaiyaraaja. A sequel titled Drishya 2 was released in 2021.

The film released on 20 June 2014 to widespread critical acclaim, with the performances of Ravichandran, Nair, and Sharath, and the screenplay being praised. It was a commercial success and completed a 100-day run in theatres.

== Plot ==
Rajendra Ponnappa is an orphan who had dropped out of school after his fourth standard. He is now a businessman running a cable television service in a rural area. He is married to Seetha and they have two daughters, Sindhu, a Plus Two student, and Shreya, a student of class sixth. His only interest apart from his family is watching films. He spends most of his time in front of the TV in his small office.

During a nature camp, Sindhu gets photographed in the bathroom by a hidden cell phone. The culprit, Tarun, is the spoiled son of Inspector General of Police Roopa Chandrashekar. Tarun is accidentally killed by Seetha and her daughter when he comes to blackmail them using the clip either any one of them should sleep with him or he will surely publish the clip through Internet. They hide his body in a compost pit, which is witnessed by Shreya. Seetha tells Rajendra about the incident and he devises a way to save his family from the law. He removes the broken cell phone and disposes of Tarun's car, which is seen by a police constable, Suryaprakash, who has a grudge against Rajendra. Rajendra takes his family on a trip to attend a religious meeting, watch a movie and eat at a restaurant. Roopa, realising that her son has gone missing starts an investigation.

After a preliminary investigation, Roopa calls Rajendra and family for questioning. Rajendra had predicted that this would happen and taught his family how to change their alibi at the time of murder. When questioned individually, they reply the same thing and they had also shown the bill of the restaurant, the movie tickets and the bus journeys' tickets as proof of their alibi. Roopa questions the owners of the establishments they have been to and their statements prove Rajendra's alibi. Roopa realises that on the day of the incident, Rajendra had taken the tickets and the bill, made acquaintance with the owners and had gone for the trip with his family the next day, thus proving his alibi and making the owners unwittingly tell the lie.

Roopa arrests Rajendra and family and Suryaprakash uses brute force to beat the truth out of them. Eventually, Shreya gives in and reveals the place where the body is buried. After digging the compost pit, they find the carcass of a calf, indicating that Rajendra had moved the body. Rajendra reports to the media and complains against Suryaprakash. The constable is suspended and Roopa resigns from her post. Roopa and her husband meet Rajendra to ask forgiveness for their rude and violent behavior. Rajendra suspects there might be foul play involved and still does not reveal directly that his family has committed a crime. Rajendra, now in remand, signs a register at the newly constructed local police station. As he leaves, a flashback shows him leaving the incomplete police station with a shovel in hand, indicating that he has hidden Tarun's body in the foundations of the very police station that dealt with the said investigation.

== Cast ==
- Ravichandran as Rajendra Ponnappa
- Navya Nair as Seetha
- Swaroopinii as Sindhu
- Unnathi as Shreya
- Asha Sarath as IG Roopa Chandrashekhar IPS
- Prabhu as Chandrashekhar
- Rohith Bhanuprakash as Tarun Chandrashekhar
- Achyuth Kumar as Constable Suryaprakash
- Suchendra Prasad as Police Inspector
- Jai Jagadish as Head Constable
- Dayal Padmanabhan as Contractor
- Srinivasa Murthy as Seetha's father
- Shivaram as Tea shop owner
- Prashanth Siddi as Rajendra's assistant
- Sadhu Kokila as restaurant customer

== Production ==
After the commercial and critical success of Drishyam, director P. Vasu decided to remake the film in either Tamil or Telugu, when he received an offer from the Kannada film production company E4 Entertainment. His name was referred to the producers by actor Ravichandran. It was revealed in February 2014 that the latter would portray Mohanlal's character from the original film. Navya Nair was cast to play his wife, the role played by Meena in the original film. Swaroopini Narayan was cast to play the role of Ravichandran's elder daughter in the film, following her successful audition for the role after having been spotted on the internet messaging service WhatsApp by one of the crew members.

Filming began on 11 March 2014, in the Kodagu district in Karnataka, a major part of which was shot in Madikeri. Small parts of the film were then shot in Bangalore and Nanjangud. As compared to the Malayalam film, Drishya was trimmed by about 15 to 20 minutes. Reports of the film being titled Drishya came out only in mid-May 2014, a month prior to the film's release.

== Soundtrack ==
The film's music was composed by Ilaiyaraaja, with lyrics written by V. Nagendra Prasad. The album consists of two songs.

Track listing
No.	Title	Singer(s)	Length
1.	"Ondu Kathe Kelu"	Vijay Prakash, Pooja Vaidyanath, M. M. Manasi, Surmukhi Raman	4:57
2.	"Devara Kelu"	Sharreth	5:26
Total length:			10:23

== Reception ==
The film received positive reviews from critics. The performances of Ravichandran, Navya Nair and Asha Sarath received overwhelmingly positive reviews, along with the film's screenplay.

Shashiprasad of Deccan Chronicle rated the film 4 of 5 stars and said, "With the perfect screenplay, Dhrishya thrills and grips the audience right till the end with crazy star V.Ravichandran at his best performance lately, which syncs so well that the character of Rajendra Ponnappa seems tailor-made for him." The reviewer of Sify.com said, "A commendable team effort and the movie is definitely worth a watch!" Shyam Prasad S. of Bangalore Mirror rated the film 3.5/5 stars and called it a "masterly remake" of the Malayalam version, and added that the film was Ravichandran's best in many years. He concluded writing praises of the performances of all the lead actors. G. S. Kumar of The Times of India too gave a 3.5/5 star rating and wrote, "Director P Vasu knows that secret and has brilliantly incorporated it in the screenplay." He added praising the performances of the lead actors and music, and giving "a special mention" to cinematographer Madhu Neelakantan's work. Writing for The New Indian Express, A. Sharadhaa reviewed the film and called it "neat little thriller and a family drama". She commended the performances of the actors, direction, screenplay and music, and the roles of the film's cinematographer and the editor.

== Sequel ==
A sequel titled Drishya 2 (2021) directed by P. Vasu was released in 2021.
