= Sulle Sathya =

Sulle Sathya: The Real Lie
- Directed by: Akash Srivatsa
- Written by: Akash Srivatsa; Santhosh G Abhijith Ramesh
- Screenplay by: Akash Srivatsa
- Story by: Guy De Maupassant
- Produced by: Ravi Kashyap; Vibha Kashyap Productions
- Starring: Mahesh M A Harleen Rekhi; Amitha Rao; Rajendra Karanth
- Cinematography: Shreesha Kuduvalli
- Edited by: 6 Face Studios
- Music by: Priyadarshan Subramanian
- Release date: 2013
- Running time: 39 minutes
- Country: India
- Language: Kannada

Sulle Sathya : The Real Lie is a 2013 Kannada short film directed by Akash Srivatsa and produced by Ravi Kashyap for Vibha Kashyap Productions. The movie stars Mahesh M A, Harleen Rekhi, and Amitha Rao in lead roles and senior theatre actor Rajendra Karanth in a supporting role. The background music of the movie is scored by Priyadarshan Subramanian. The songs for the film were composed by many young composers who came together for the first time. Based on the short story "The False Gems" by Guy De Maupassant, Sulle Sathya is a gripping tale about human relationships in urban Bangalore.

== Plot ==
Based on the short story "The False Gems" by Guy De Maupassant, Sulle Sathya is the story of one man as he wades through life and love, searching for answers that elude him. Karthik, the protagonist goes through contrastingly different marriages with two women, Maya and Priya, each raising different questions about love, trust, and most importantly life. In the end, Karthik looks back at his life and wonders, confused and clueless as to what step to take.

== Cast ==
- Mahesh M A as Karthik
- Harleen Rekhi as Maya
- Amitha Rao as Priya
- Rajendra Karanth as The jeweler

== Track listing ==
#	Title	Music	Singers	Lyrics
1	"Kannanchali"	Nadeem - Rajesh	Deepak Doddera	Rajesh Sirsikar
2	"Dillalondu"	Vijendra Kalalbandi	Deepak Doddera	Akash Srivatsa with additional Lyrics by Jnanendra Koppal
3	"Nanna Olavina"	Judah Sandhy	Deepak Doddera	Akash Srivatsa
4	"Siriye Nee"	Priyadarshan Subramanian	Deepak Doddera	Akash Srivatsa & Jnanendra Koppal
5	"Nanna Manasaare"	Judah Sandhy	Deepak Doddera	Akash Srivatsa & Jnanendra Koppal

== Awards and screenings ==
- Best Lyricist Award for Akash Srivatsa for the song "Nanna Olavina" at the 1st Kannada International Music Awards
- Bangalore Roof Top Film Festival
- Opening film, Rolling Frames Short Film Summit
- Official Selection, 66th Festival de Cannes - 2013, the Short Film Corner
