= Shivaji Surathkal 2 =

2023 Kannada language film

- Release poster
- Directed by: Akash Srivatsa
- Written by: Akash Srivatsa; Abhijith YR
- Produced by: Rekha K. N. Anup Hanumanthe Gowda
- Starring: Ramesh Aravind; Radhika Narayan; Meghana Gaonkar; Sangeetha Sringeri; Nassar; Aarohi Narayan
- Cinematography: Guruprasad M. G. Darshan M. Ambatt
- Edited by: Akash Srivatsa
- Music by: Judah Sandhy
- Production company: Anjanadri Cine Creations
- Distributed by: KRG Studios
- Release date: 14 April 2023
- Running time: 148 minutes
- Country: India
- Language: Kannada

Shivaji Surathkal 2: The Mysterious Case of Maayavi is a 2023 Indian Kannada-language mystery thriller film directed by Akash Srivatsa and produced by Anup Hanumanthe Gowda under Anjanadri Cine Creations. It stars Ramesh Aravind, Radhika Narayan, Meghana Gaonkar, Sangeetha Sringeri, Nassar and Aarohi Narayan. The film is the sequel to 2020 film Shivaji Surathkal.

Shivaji Surathkal 2: The Mysterious Case of Maayavi was released on 14 April 2023, where it received positive reviews from critics and became a commercial success at the box office.

== Plot ==
ACP Shivaji Surathkal of Crime Branch leads a happy life with his adopted daughter Siri Surathkal. He is called by DCP Deepa Kamath to investigate the disappearance of Nidhi, who is the daughter of a journalist named Dilip Rai. Shivaji, along with constable Govindu leave for Yellapur as Nidhi was with her friends there on a trip. Shivaji, Govindu and the area SI Mahesh search for Nidhi and find her corpse at an abandoned area and also a letter written in Halegannada. Shivaji uploads it to social media for anyone to inform them about the letter; they learn through a lady that her daughter Nethra was also killed in the same manner and the same letter was found.

Through his father and retired DGP Vijayendra Surathkal, Shivaji learns that the motive of the killer is to exact revenge and that the killer's name is Maayavi as inscribed in the letter. Maayavi sends a camera to Shivaji and the police department, challenging them to save the third victim from getting killed. Shivaji tracks down the place where Maayavi plans to kill the third victim. However, Maayavi kills the third victim, who is revealed to be Inspector Kiran, and challenges Shivaji to save the fourth victim. Shivaji learns that the fourth victim is actually Pankaja, a dubbing artist and Vijendra's friend Adv. Ramakant Joshi's daughter. Shivaji tracks down Maayavi and Pankaja on a train. Maayavi escapes and Shivaji chases after him. Shivaji is knocked down by Maayavi. He wakes up and learns that Maayavi has framed him for the killings. Despite being under house arrest, Shivaji learns that Maayavi's motive behind the targets are related to Siri and recollects the past.

Past: Shivaji meets Siri's real mother Lakshmi, who requests him to save Siri. While Shivaji heads to a medical shop to buy his anxiety tablets, Lakshmi hides Siri in Shivaji's car and leaves. She dies in a hit-and-run case. Shivaji decides to legally adopt Siri as his daughter. However, Siri is taken away by Vijayendra and Shivaji confronts him about the reason. Vijayendra reveals that Lakshmi was killed by her psychotic husband Prof. Rudra, who was directed to undergo psychotherapy in a mental hospital after he tried to kill Lakshmi for slightly injuring Siri. Rudra had escaped from the asylum for Siri and had killed Lakshmi when she refused to reveal Siri's location. Vijayendra decides to use Siri as a bait to capture Rudra, but Shivaji refuses due to fear of Siri suffering from mental trauma. Vijayendra finally manages to make Rudra confess his killings, and mentally tortures him. However, Rudra escapes again from police custody and is nowhere to be seen.

Present: Shivaji analyse that Nethra, Nidhi, Kiran and Pankaja were killed as their fathers were also involved in separating Siri from Rudra and his fifth victim is Shivaji himself. Shivaji also reveals that Rudra did not frame him as the killer and confronts Mahesh. Mahesh reveals that Rudra had warned Vijayendra about Shivaji's impending death and Vijayendra had taken help from some of his contacts in placing Shivaji under house arrest. Shivaji calls Vijendra and learns that Rudra has kidnapped him. Rudra tells Shivaji to bring Siri in exchange for Vijayendra's life. Shivaji brings Siri and Rudra reveals himself to be Dr. Prathap, whom Shivaji had met earlier. Rudra reveals that he was forced to take plastic surgery due to a fire accident during his escape and had changed his identity to Dr. Prathap. Shivaji finally manages to finish Rudra/Dr. Prathap and saves Siri, but Vijayendra gets shot and dies. In the aftermath, Shivaji and Siri scatters Vijayendra's ashes in the sea.

== Cast ==
- Ramesh Aravind as ACP Shivaji Surathkal, Crime Branch
- Radhika Narayan as Janani, Shivaji's deceased wife
- Meghana Gaonkar as DCP Deepa Kamath
- Sangeetha Sringeri as Sharmila, Dancer Cameo appearance
- Nassar as DGP Vijendra Surathkal (Retd.), Shivaji's father
- Aradhya Chandra as Siri Surathkal, Shivaji's daughter
- Raghu Ramanakoppa as Govindu
- Poornachandra Mysore as Professor Rudra / Dr. Pratap
- K S Sridhar as Inspector Bhim Rao
- Ramesh Bhat as Adv. Ramakant Joshi
- Shobaraj as IG Manikvel
- Vinayak Joshi as Inspector Vinod Rao
- Sundar as Dr. Vikram
- Veena Sundar as Nethra's mother
- Vidya Murthy as Shivaji's mother-in-law
- Srinivas Prabhu as Dilip Rai
- Sumanth Bhat as Inspector Mahesh
- Puneet B. A. as Michael, a hacker
- Madhura Gowda as Nidhi
- Nidhi Hegde

== Reception ==
Sridevi S of Times of india gave 3/5 stars and wrote that "Overall, the audience can go to the theatres to be charmed by Shivaji’s wit and intelligence and to watch him solve another interesting mystery case, at his own pace." Subha. J. Rao of The News Minute gave 3.5/5 stars and wrote "Editor/director Akash Srivatsa strikes gold with his sequel of Shivaji Surathkal. The interesting writing and the pace of the film take it to the winning post." A Sharadhaa of The New Indian Express gave 3/5 stars and wrote "Shivaji Surathkal 2, a pure investigative thriller amid a slew of commercial entertainers comes across as a relief. While most of the usual heroes take down dozens of goons with their brawn, Shivaji Surathkal once again wins the day with his brain." Swaroop Kodur of OTTplay gave 2.5/5 stars and wrote "Shivaji Surathkal 2: The Mysterious Case Of Maayavi boasted a big opportunity to take things a notch up but the lack of clarity in the approach pulls it down."
