= Mersal (soundtrack) =

2017 film score by A. R. Rahman

- Soundtrack album cover

Soundtrack album by A. R. Rahman
- Released: 20 August 2017
- Recorded: 2017
- Studios: Panchathan Record Inn and AM Studios, Chennai; A. R. Studios, Mumbai; Abbey Road Studios, London
- Genre: Feature film soundtrack
- Length: 19:06
- Language: Tamil
- Label: Sony Music India
- Producer: A. R. Rahman

A. R. Rahman chronology
Viceroy's House (2017)	Mersal (2017)	2.0 (2017)

Singles from Mersal
- 1. "Aalaporaan Thamizhan" Released: 10 August 2017; 2. "Neethanae" Released: 17 August 2017

Mersal is the soundtrack of the 2017 Indian vigilante action film of the same name directed by Atlee, which stars Vijay in a triple role with Nithya Menen, Kajal Aggarwal and Samantha as the female leads. The film, which marked the 100th production of Thenandal Studio Limited, has a soundtrack album features four tracks composed by A. R. Rahman, in his first collaboration with Atlee and his third collaboration with Vijay after composing for Udhaya (2004) and Azhagiya Tamizh Magan (2007), whilst Vivek penned the lyrics for all the songs in the film's soundtrack, also in his first association with Rahman.

Being one of the most anticipated soundtracks in Tamil cinema, the album was released at a promotional music launch event held at Jawaharlal Nehru Indoor Stadium in Chennai on 20 August 2017, by Sony Music India with the songs being made available for streaming via internet on the day of its launch. The soundtrack was a critical and commercial success, it was the first Tamil album to have more than 100 million streams between all music platforms. It fetched a number of accolades and nominations at various ceremonies.

== Production ==
Since Atlee's norm collaborator G. V. Prakash Kumar, who worked with him on Raja Rani and Theri, became busy with his acting commitments, the director had plans to rope a different composer for this film, with S. Thaman being speculated for the project. However A. R. Rahman was announced as the composer in late-January 2017. Rahman started composing for the film's soundtrack after completing the re-recording of Mani Ratnam's Kaatru Veliyidai in March. In June 2017, G. V. Prakash Kumar was reported to record an energetic number in the film; it was the first song Prakash had recorded for Rahman after 18 years, since Mudhalvan (1999). In late-July 2017, Kailash Kher recorded the song "Aalaporaan Tamizhan", since Rahman felt that "nobody could reach the pitch apart from the singer". The song was also co-recorded by Sathya Prakash, Deepak and Pooja Vaidyanath. The same month, Shreya Ghoshal recorded a melodic number for the film. By September 2017, Rahman started re-recording works for the film's music and score.

As a part of the promotions, the song "Aalaporaan Thamizhan" was released as a single on 10 August 2017, and eventually topped the charts online. The song portrayed the pride of Tamil heritage all across the world. Manoj Kumar R. of The Indian Express said that the song "will indeed be the new Tamil anthem of sorts among the young population that led the pro-Jallikattu protests". Hindustan Times wrote "In typical AR Rahman style, it moves from a beats-intensive tempo to soft-lilting melodious moments in a seamless fashion". Later, the second single "Neethanae" was unveiled on 17 August 2017; a melodic number sung by Shreya Ghoshal and Rahman. Other songs in the tracklist are: "Maacho" sung by Sid Sriram and Shweta Mohan, and "Mersal Arasan" which was recorded by G. V. Prakash Kumar, Naresh Iyer, Sharanya Srinivas, T. G. Vishwaprasad. The album did not feature any song recorded by actor Vijay, marking the first time he hadn't sang for an album since Nanban. There were reports being surfaced that Vijay will record a reprised version of one of the film's tracks which did not happen.

== Release ==
The soundtrack album was highly anticipated by film buffs as it marked the decade-long collaboration between Vijay and Rahman as well as their first release in their silver-jubilee years. In July 2017, Hema Rukmani of Thenandal Studio Limited announced that the film's audio launch would be held on 20 August 2017, with Sony Music acquiring the rights of the music album for a ₹3.5 crore; the highest ever for a Tamil film in that time. (Note: The amount is equivalent to ₹40 million (equivalent to ₹54 million or US$560,000 in 2026) in 2019.) Since the film marked Thenandal's 100th production, the producers opted for a grand event at the Jawaharlal Nehru Stadium in Chennai, with The Indian Express highlighted it as the "biggest Kollywood event of the year". The event witnessed the attendance of prominent celebrities from the Tamil film industry along with the film's cast and crew, including Dhanush, Sundar C, amongst others were attended at the event, which was hosted by R. Parthiban. A. R. Rahman and his musical team performed the album live on stage. The audio launch event was aired live on Sun TV, despite being reported that three television channels will stream the launch live. The audio event was streamed live on the official YouTube channel of the music label, and also via Facebook and Twitter through the accounts of the production house. The album was made available for streaming through internet for digital download on the same day of the launch.

== Reception ==
=== Critical response ===
The album opened to rave reviews from critics upon release. V. Lakshmi from The Times of India rated three-and-a-half out of five stars, stating that "Rahman has been on an experimental mode in his last few albums, and he continues experimenting in 'Mersal' as well, especially with tunes and indigenous instruments. While the lengthy numbers may not be attractive in its first listen, the songs will be a perfect pick in the playlist, while being played on loop." She felt that the album was "grand" especially in terms of "soundscape and orchestration". Writing for Firstpost, Mridula Ramadugu felt that the soundtrack is "a mix of Vijay's commercial expectations with Rahman's trademark music" and a "mixed bag of tunes and noteworthy lyrics (by Vivek), with few catchy and few forgettable tracks". Ashameera Aiyappan of The Indian Express called the album as "a mix of mass and class". Behindwoods gave the album a rating of 3.25 out of five stars saying, "AR Rahman weaves out a mass based classy album fitting in all the elements required for Vijay's screen presence".

Archana Nathan of Scroll.in called that "The score by Rahman tries to accommodate the requirements of a mass entertainer". She further added that "whether it comes to highly energetic tracks such as 'Aalaporaan Thamizhan' or 'Mersal Arasan', Rahman accentuates the effusive lyrics by beating the drums heavily at the turn of each phrase". Writing for BollywoodLife.com, Karthika Raveendran stated that "with an album like this, the music maestro (AR Rahman) hasn't lost his sheen, magic or his ability to surprise even after 25 years". Indiaglitz gave the album a rating of 3.25 out of five, calling the album "a mixture of mass and class", further saying the tracks as "innovative". In contrast, Critic Ramesh Kannan from Moviecrow rated the album three out of five, stating that "AR Rahman delivers a mass album to satiate Vijay fans but the soundtrack is far-off from the composer's best." Vipin Nair of Music Aloud called the album as "short and unremarkable" assigning a score of two-and-a-half out of five. Karthik Srinivasan of Milliblog stated the album as "Rahman's weakest in ages".

=== Chart performance ===
Upon its release in August 2017, the first single "Aalaporan Thamizhan" topped the charts in iTunes, and became the most searched songs of India in Google, according to Google Trends. The music video for "Aalaporan Thamizhan" crossed 100 million views and became the most viewed song in Vijay's career, until it was surpassed by "Vaathi Coming", another song from the Vijay-starrer Master (2021). The album crossed 100 million streams within ten-days of its release, setting a streaming record for a Tamil album. In September 2018, the album was streamed for 350 million times on all music platforms.

Weekly charts

Chart (2017–18)	Song	Peak position	Reference(s)
Radio Mirchi (Top 20) – Tamil	"Aalaporaan Thamizhan"	1	
Radio Mirchi (Top 20) – Tamil	"Neethanae"	5	
Radio Mirchi (Top 20) – Tamil	"Mersal Arasan"	6	
Radio Mirchi (Top 20) – Tamil	"Maacho"	7	

Year-end charts

Chart (2017)	Song	Position	Reference(s)
Radio Mirchi (Top 100) – Tamil	"Aalaporaan Thamizhan"	1	
Radio Mirchi (Top 100) – Tamil	"Mersal Arasan"	12	
Radio Mirchi (Top 100) – Tamil	"Neethanae"	19	
The Times of India (Top 10)	"Aalaporaan Thamizhan"	1	
Moviecrow (Top 20)	"Aalaporaan Thamizhan"	1	

Other chart list

- 2nd (Top 10) – Siddharth K, Sify
- 1st (Top 10) – Ramesh Kannan, Moviecrow

== Track listing ==
All tracks are written by Vivek.

No.	Title	Singer(s)	Length
1.	"Aalaporaan Thamizhan"	Kailash Kher, Sathya Prakash, Deepak Blue, Pooja Vaidyanath	5:48
2.	"Neethanae"	Shreya Ghoshal, A. R. Rahman	4:29
3.	"Maacho"	Sid Sriram, Shweta Mohan	4:35
4.	"Mersal Arasan"	G.V. Prakash Kumar, Naresh Iyer, Sharanya Srinivas, T. G. Vishwaprasad	4:16
Total length:			19:09

== Awards and nominations ==
Award (Note: Awards, festivals and organizations are in alphabetical order.)	Date of ceremony (Note: Date is linked to the article about the awards held that year, wherever possible.)	Category	Recipient(s)	Result	Ref.
Ananda Vikatan Cinema Awards	10 January 2018	Best Music Director	A. R. Rahman (Note: Also for Kaatru Veliyidai)	Won	
Ananda Vikatan Cinema Awards	10 January 2018	Best Playback Singer — Female	Shreya Ghoshal for "Neethane" (Note: Also for "Mazhaikulle" from Puriyatha Puthir)	Won	
Edison Awards	26 February 2018	Best Male Playback Singer	Sathyaprakash for "Aalaporaan Thamizhan"	Won	
Edison Awards	26 February 2018	Best Lyricist	Vivek	Won	
Edison Awards	26 February 2018	Best Choreographer	Shobi	Won	
Filmfare Awards South	16 June 2018	Best Music Director – Tamil	A. R. Rahman	Won	
Filmfare Awards South	16 June 2018	Best Male Playback Singer – Tamil	A. R. Rahman for "Neethane"	Nominated	
Filmfare Awards South	16 June 2018	Best Male Playback Singer – Tamil	Sid Sriram for "Macho"	Nominated	
Filmfare Awards South	16 June 2018	Best Female Playback Singer – Tamil	Shreya Ghoshal for "Neethane"	Nominated	
Filmfare Awards South	16 June 2018	Best Female Playback Singer – Tamil	Shweta Mohan for "Macho"	Nominated	
Filmfare Awards South	16 June 2018	Best Lyricist – Tamil	Vivek for "Aalaporaan Thamizhan"	Nominated	
Filmfare Awards South	16 June 2018	Best Lyricist – Tamil	Vivek for "Neethane"	Nominated	
South Indian International Movie Awards	14 – 15 September 2018	Best Music Director	A. R. Rahman	Won	
South Indian International Movie Awards	14 – 15 September 2018	Best Lyricist	Vivek for "Aalaporaan Thamizhan"	Won	
South Indian International Movie Awards	14 – 15 September 2018	Best Male Playback Singer	A. R. Rahman for "Neethane"	Nominated	
South Indian International Movie Awards	14 – 15 September 2018	Best Male Playback Singer	Sid Sriram for "Macho"	Won	
South Indian International Movie Awards	14 – 15 September 2018	Best Female Playback Singer	Shreya Ghoshal for "Neethane"	Nominated	
Techofes Awards	19 February 2018	Best Male Playback Singer	Sathyaprakash for "Aalaporaan Thamizhan"	Won	
Techofes Awards	19 February 2018	Best Female Playback Singer	Pooja Vaidyanath for "Aalaporaan Thamizhan"	Won	
Techofes Awards	19 February 2018	Best Lyricist	Vivek	Won	
Techofes Awards	19 February 2018	Best Choreographer	Shobi	Won	
Vijay Awards	3 June 2018	Best Male Playback Singer	A. R. Rahman for "Neethane"	Nominated	
Vijay Awards	3 June 2018	Best Female Playback Singer	Shreya Ghoshal for "Neethane"	Nominated	
Vijay Awards	3 June 2018	Best Lyricist	Vivek for "Aalaporaan Thamizhan"	Nominated	
Vijay Awards	3 June 2018	Favourite Song	"Aalaporaan Thamizhan"	Won	

== Legacy ==
The success of the soundtrack prompted its contributor Vivek, to become a leading lyricist in a short span of time after his debut work in 36 Vayadhinile.
