= 2.0 =

2.0 may refer to:

== Technology ==
- The second version of a computer program in software versioning
- Stereophonic sound, two channel audio, sometimes notated 2.0

== Film and television ==
- 2.0 (film), a 2018 Indian film sequel to Enthiran (2010)
  - 2.0 (soundtrack), its soundtrack album by A. R. Rahman
- "2.0" (Nikita), a 2010 episode of Nikita

== Music ==
- 2.0 (98 Degrees album), 2013
- 2.0 (Big Data album), 2015
- 2.0 (Citizen Way album), 2016
- 2.0 EP, a 2019 extended play by Artigeardit
- 2.0 (JLS album), 2021
- 2.0 (Henry Santos album), 2024
- 2.0 (Brett Young album), 2025
- "2.0" (song), a 2026 song by BTS

== Other uses ==
- 2point0, a professional wrestling tag team, also known as 2.0
- 2, a natural number
