= Hottegagi Genu Battegagi =

2018 film written and directed by Narendra Babu

- Directed by: Narendra Babu
- Screenplay by: Narendra Babu
- Story by: Narendra Babu
- Produced by: Sudarshan G. Ramamurthy H. R. Harish Sherigar
- Starring: Anant Nag; Radhika Chetan; Gitanjali Rai
- Cinematography: P. K. H. Das
- Edited by: Guna
- Music by: Ramchandra Hadapad
- Production company: ACME Movies International
- Release date: 25 May 2018
- Country: India
- Language: Kannada

Hottegagi Genu Battegagi is a 2018 Indian Kannada language drama film written and directed by Narendra Babu. Produced by Sudarshan G, Ramamurthy H R, and Harish Sherigar, the film's music is scored by Ramchandra Hadapad. This movie is influenced by a 2015 Hollywood movie, The Intern, starring Robert De Niro and Anne Hathaway. Anant Nag, Radhika Chetan, and Gitanjali Rai feature in the main roles. P K H Das is the cinematographer of the film under the banner of ACME Movies International.

== Cast ==
- Anant Nag as Shyam Prasad
- Radhika Chetan as Shravya
- Gitanjali Rai
- Harish Sherigar
- Rakesh (rocko) as Mohith

== Production ==
The title for the film, which is a proverb in the Kannada language, was suggested by Anant Nag, who was cast to play the lead role. The director, Narendra Babu, revealed that the title Kallu Sakkare Koliro was titled before Nag recommended Hottegagi Genu Battegagi after reading the script. Babu added that the difference in ideas between the two generations was set as the film's theme and is portrayed by an aging man employed at a corporate company and his young female boss.

== Soundtrack ==
Hottegagi Genu Battegagi

Soundtrack album by Ramachandra Hadpad
- Released: December 2017
- Recorded: 2017
- Genre: Feature film soundtrack
- Length: 16:13
- Label: Times Music

Ramachandra Hadpad composed the score and songs for the film. The soundtrack album was released in December 2017.

Track list
No.	Title	Singer(s)	Length
1.	"Ajnanadinda Thayi Berigee"	Armaan Malik, Shwetha Prabhu
2.	"Nee Enagee Iniyanalla"	Anweshaa
3.	"Raagi Mudde"	Varsha B Suresh
4.	"Santhasada Doni Eraythu"	Vijay Prakash, Varsha B Suresh
