= Chase (2022 film) =

2022 Kannada-language film

- Official poster
- Directed by: Vilok Shetty
- Produced by: Manohar Suvarana
- Starring: Radhika Narayan; Avinash S Divakar
- Cinematography: Ananth Urs
- Edited by: Sri Crazyminndz
- Music by: Karthik Acharya
- Production company: Simply Fun Media Network Pvt Ltd.
- Release date: 15 June 2022
- Country: India
- Language: Kannada

Chase is a 2022 Indian Kannada-language crime drama film directed by Vilok Shetty. The film is a partial adaptation of the Korean film Blind. The film stars Radhika Narayan and Avinash S Divakar.

== Cast ==
- Radhika Narayan as Nidhi
- Avinash S Divakar as Avinash
- Sheetal Shetty as a doctor
- Arjun Yogesh Raj as Yash
- Sushant Pujari
- Aravind Bolar
- Arvind Rao as driver
- Swetha Sanjeevulu as Swetha
- Rajesh Nataranga

== Production ==
Radhika Narayan learnt Krav Maga for the role. Actor Avinash Divakar also worked as an art director for the film.

== Reception ==
Sunayana Suresh of The Times of India wrote that "Chase is a good outing to the cinema hall, even though the film did take a while to hit the screens. It will definitely interest lovers of the thriller genre". A. Sharadhaa of The New Indian Express opined that "Honestly, contrary to the title, this is not at all a film that needs to be chased and watched". Y Mahesswara Reddy of Bangalore Mirror stated that "if you really want to watch this movie, make sure you are ready to cope with the post-intermission session, which can just end up testing your patience.
