= Meaghamann =

2014 Indian film by Magizh Thirumeni

- Theatrical release poster
- Directed by: Magizh Thirumeni
- Written by: Magizh Thirumeni
- Produced by: Nemichand Jhabak
- Starring: Arya; Hansika Motwani
- Cinematography: S. R. Sathish Kumar
- Edited by: N. B. Srikanth
- Music by: S Thaman
- Production company: Jhabaks Films
- Release date: 25 December 2014
- Running time: 138 minutes
- Country: India
- Language: Tamil

Meaghamann (transl. Captain of the ship) is a 2014 Indian Tamil-language action thriller film written and directed by Magizh Thirumeni and produced by Nemichand Jhabak. The film stars an ensemble cast of Arya, Hansika Motwani, Ashutosh Rana, Sudhanshu Pandey, Ramana, Ashish Vidyarthi, Mahadevan, and Harish Uthaman. S. Thaman composed the film's soundtrack and background score, while the cinematography is done by S. R. Sathish Kumar. Meaghamann was released on 25 December 2014.

== Plot ==
In Goa, six dead bodies are washed ashore, where the police department deduces that Jothi, a drug lord, is responsible for the mess. The police is unable to capture him for nearly a decade because not a single person has seen him in person, as he is constantly on the move and has no permanent aides or accomplices. Chitti is in charge of the drug trafficking in and around Goa. One day, he receives a call from Jothi about a missing drug consignment. Chitti and his men are unable to hunt down the culprit, where it is revealed that Shiva is the mastermind behind the drug theft and is working for Chitti as his most trusted henchman. Chitti, along with his nephew Guru and Shiva, runs a crime syndicate in Goa.

In a turn of events, Shiva is actually Arul, an undercover officer who is assigned to expose Jothi and his entire drug cartel. He receives instructions from his superior officers Bharathi Chandrasekar and Benjamin Vas and informs them of his gang's activities from time to time. Arul is into this mission, along with his best friend and colleague Karthik, who also takes a stage name as Malik and works for Sharma, another drug lord from Gujarat, who has 1000 kilograms of pure cocaine and is looking for a buyer. The plan of Bharathi, Benjamin, and their team is to make Sharma and Jothi meet each other for the transaction of the 1000 kilograms of cocaine and arrest them.

Arul informs Bharathi that Sharma and Jothi are planning a trial with just 100 kilograms of cocaine, and if all goes well, they will deal with the remaining 900 kilograms. Bharathi and her team wisely plan to capture the huge bulk of 900 kilograms of drugs, along with Sharma and Jothi, so they have to leave the first trial transaction unmonitored. However, all plans go awry when Bharathi's jealous boss disagrees with her plan and conducts a raid for the trial transaction at the last moment. The raid exposes Karthik's identity, who is taken to Chitti's place and tortured by Guru and his gang to reveal the identity of any other man working with him.

Unable to bear the pain, Karthik reveals Arul's identity. Guru informs Chitti about Arul's true identity. When they attempt to kill him, Arul guns down Chitti and starts eliminating all the gang members, including Guru. Soon, Arul finds Karthik, but the latter dies within moments. Jothi is now aware of the death of Chitti and his entire crew and uses his influence on the police to bring Arul into his custody. The police force and Jothi's men join hands and hunt for Arul. Arul, all alone on this mission, continues his own plan to expose Jothi and gets himself captured on purpose. Now that he has nothing to lose, he plans to play a final game of chance to meet Jothi face-to-face, earn his trust, and join as a henchman again. Arul is the only survivor of the shootout at Chitti's place, and so only his account to Jothi will earn his trust.

Arul is brought to Jothi and cleverly convinces him, but only to an extent. He tells Jothi that his former partner-turned-archenemy Rane is responsible for the drug theft and shootout at Chitti's place. Jothi had thought Rane was dead, but Rane is actually alive and is plotting his vengeance. Jothi is still sceptical, so Arul is given two days to prove that Rane is alive and has done everything. Arul succeeds by getting help from a prostitute whom he helped earlier. Arul places all the stolen drugs at Rane's house and leads Jothi's men there, and they find the lost drugs. Jothi asks his men to kill Rane and his gang. Arul cleverly does certain manipulations, kills Rane and his men, and places his own guns in Rane's hands. This leads Jothi and his men to believe that Rane's gun and the one used in the shootout at Chitti's place are the same.

The gun is also sent for ballistic testing to verify Arul's story, which they all believe is true. Jothi asks Arul to join his gang and meet him at a secluded place. When Arul waits for the opportunity to gun down Jothi, he gets beaten up by his men. It is then revealed that Arul's neighbor Usha, who was in love with him, had been secretly recording videos of him for her to admire, but her phone falls into the hands of Jothi's men. They find out who Arul has been meeting and dealing with so far, and learn he is also an undercover cop. As a result, Bharathi and Benjamin are assassinated by Jothi's men.

Jothi and his men beat Arul savagely, keep him bound in a harbour, and ask him the whereabouts of Sharma's remaining 900 kilograms of cocaine. Arul whispers the location, and as Jothi comes closer to hear him, Arul spits a blade into his eyes. When all of Jothi's men are distracted, Arul escapes from his captors and kills them, leaving Jothi alone, and arrests him. Since no one alive has seen Jothi in person, his arrest is unavoidable, and no political influence will work out. Arul rejects Usha's proposal and asks her to focus on her life. He then moves on to his next mission, where he kills Sharma and seizes the remaining 900 kilograms of cocaine.

== Cast ==
- Arya as DSP Arul/Shiva
- Hansika Motwani as Usha
- Ashutosh Rana as Jothi Bhai
- Sudhanshu Pandey as Rane, Jothi's nemesis
- Ramana as DSP Karthik Vishwanath/Malik
- Ashish Vidyarthi as Sharma
- Mahadevan as Chitti
- Avinash as Avinash Bhote
- Harish Uthaman as Guru
- Anupama Kumar as AC Bharathi Chandrasekar
- O. A. K. Sundar as AC Benjamin Vas
- Sanjana Singh as Rane's wife
- Jeeva Ravi as Anil Nair
- Saravana Subbiah as Sathish Gawade
- Maha Gandhi as Issaac
- C. K. Jeeva as Usha's father
- Gaayathri Raman as Usha's mother
- Saberna Anand as Saberna (SI's wife)
- Vinoth Shaam as Rane's brother
- Pondy Ravi as Yakub
- Anandhi Ajay as Pavithra
- Vel Ravindran as Anil Nair
- Shimor as David
- Maaran as Prakash
- Nicholas as Chandra
- Aathma Patrick

== Production ==
=== Development ===
Reports in early 2013 suggested that Magizh Thirumeni would make a police film starring Arya, though, by February 2013, the actor came out and stated he had no dates available to commit. In August 2013, producer Hitesh Jhabak was able to unite the director and actor, revealing that the pair had signed terms to begin a film under his production house in late 2013. The title Meaghamann was announced that December. The director revealed that the film would be an action entertainer which would cover the lives of middle-class people.

=== Casting and filming ===
Hansika Motwani, who plays the lead actress, described her character to be that of a Tamil Brahmin girl named usha, who is "self-centred and egotistical". Principal photography began in early December 2013. The film was shot primarily in Goa, while shooting also took place on a set constructed at Binny Mills. By mid-June 2014, filming was close to 70% complete. Shooting wrapped that July. For shooting one of the songs, which featured an intimate sequence between the lead pair, Magizh shot the song in such a way that it would not look "vulgar" on screen.

== Music ==
Thaman S composed the music. The audio launch took place on 14 August 2014. Siddharth K of Sify gave the album 2 out of 5 and wrote, "On the whole, Thaman delivers an underwhelming, short soundtrack which suggests that the movie has less scope for songs. Yean Ingu Vandhaan stands out from the rest of the songs in the album though." Karthik Srinivasan of Milliblog wrote, "Surprisingly short soundtrack by Thaman, with Yaen Ingu Vandhaan being the undeniable winner."

No.	Title	Lyrics	Singer(s)	Length
1.	"Meaghamann"	Madhan Karky	M. M. Manasi, M M Monisha	2:08
2.	"Yaen Ingu Vandhaan"	Madhan Karky	Pooja Vaidyanath	4:10
3.	"Yaaro Yaaro"	Eknaath	Megha	3:39
4.	"Meaghamann – Theme Music"	Madhan Karky	M M Manasi, M M Monisha	1:46
Total length:				11:43

== Release ==
The lead cast along with Magizh Thirumeni promoted the film on 15 August 2014 during Independence Day on Star Vijay. The satellite rights of the film were sold to Star Vijay for a reported ₹8.5 crore (US$880,000). The film was released on 25 December 2014, Christmas day. It was also dubbed in Telugu as Mande Suryudu (transl. Burning sun).

== Critical reception ==
Baradwaj Rangan wrote for The Hindu, "the younger Tamil directors are slowly adopting the Hollywood model, which is the only model that works when it comes to gritty action-adventures...The plotting is pretty tight...More impressively, the director doesn’t seek to pander to family audiences. He understands that a certain amount of brutality is necessary in these films, and he unleashes scenes of corpse-kicking and chainsaw-abetted-limb-hacking and a scene with a maimed eyeball that probably has Buñuel chuckling". M. Suganth of The Times of India gave the film 3.5 stars out of 5 and wrote, "Meaghamann takes a while to pick up...But once we get the background info on the various gangs, cops and the moles on either side, we are drawn into the plot, which is intricately woven and manages to keep us on the edge of our seats". IANS gave 3 stars out of 5 and called it an "almost satisfying action film going by Tamil cinema standards". Sify wrote, "Meaghamann is another film where the plot is ambitious and paper work is good but falls short in execution. Acting in most parts is acceptable but the film never manages to captivate its audience".
