= M. M. Manasi =

Indian singer

Manasi
- Born: M. M. Manasi; 8 January 1993 (age 33); Bombay, Maharashtra, India
- Genres: Playback singer, Dubbing artist
- Occupations: singer, voice artist
- Instruments: vocals, keyboard
- Years active: 2001–present

M. M. Manasi (born 8 January 1993) is an Indian playback singer trained in Hindustani vocals and also dubbing artist. She has sung more than 170 songs in Tamil, Telugu, Kannada, Malayalam, Hindi, and English. Her hits in Tamil are "Stylish Thamizachi" in Aarambam, "Kattikeda" in Kaaki Sattai, "Semma Mass" in Massu, "Robo Romeo" in Tamizhuku En Ondrai Azhuthavum, "Sottavaala" in Puli, "Aatakari Maman Ponnu" in Ilayaraja's 1000th film Tharai Thappattai and "Ranjithame" in Varisu.

She won the SIIMA Award for Best Female Playback Singer (Telugu) for ''Rangamma Mangamma'' from the 2018 Tollywood periodic-drama film Rangasthalam.

== Early life ==
Manasi was born to Tamil-speaking parents in Chennai and grew up in Mumbai. At the age of 2, she started learning music. Her first public performances were bhajans sung during Navratri and Ganpati poojas. She completed her studies at the School of Management at D.G. Vaishnav College. She has a sister, M. M. Monisha, who is also a playback singer.

== Career ==
Manasi was introduced by Ilaiyaraja to the Kannada music industry for the movie Drishya and by Vidhyasagar in Malayalam for Oru Indian Pranayakadha. She made an entry into Bollywood with "Daddy Mummy" in Bhaag Johnny for music director Devi Sri Prasad. This song has over 20 million views on YouTube.

Apart from singing, Manasi has also done voice acting for leading heroines in the Tamil film industry. These include Baahubali, Thozha, Dharmadurai, Devi, and Kaththi Sandai for Tamannaah Bhatia, Maari for Kajal Agarwal, Anjaan for Samantha, Kamalinee Mukherjee in Iraivi, Meaghamann for Hansika Motwani, Darling and Velainu Vandhutta Vellaikaaran for Nikki Galrani, Tamizhuku En Ondrai Azhuthavum for Bindhu Madhavi, Vai Raja Vai for Taapsee, Yaan for Thulasi, Idharkkuthane Aasai Pattai Balakumara for Swathi, Thirumanam Enum Nikkah for Nazriya, and Oh My Kadavule for Ritika Singh.

Manasi has sung in Telugu and has many charting songs to her credit, like "Bhelpuri" in Aagadu, "Notanki" in Power, "Private Party" in Sarrainodu, "Gunde Aagi Pothande" in Shivam, "Meenakshi" in Masala, "Om Sarvani" in Legend, "Mara O Mara" in Tadakha, "Lucky Lucky Rai" in Balupu, and "Rangamma Mangamma" in Rangasthalam.

== Discography ==
=== As playback singer ===
This is only a partial list; Manasi has sung over 170 songs in Telugu, Kannada, Tamil, Malayalam and Hindi

Year	Film	Language	Song	Music director	Co-singer(s)
2010	Collector Gari Bharya	Telugu	"No No"	Chinna	
2013	Okkadine	Telugu	"Hola Hola"	Karthik	Karthik
2013	Oru Indian Pranayakadha	Malayalam	"Saajan"	Vidyasagar	Shweta Mohan
2013	Annakodi	Tamil	"Poraale"	G.V. Prakash Kumar	S. P. B. Charan
2013	1: Nenokkadine	Telugu	"O Sayonara Sayonara"	Devi Sri Prasad	Sooraj Santhosh
2013	Tadakha	Telugu	"Viyyalavaru"	S.S. Thaman	Sooraj Santhosh
2013	Tadakha	Telugu	"Mara O Mara"	S.S. Thaman	Suchith Suresan
2013	Balupu	Telugu	"Lucky Lucky Rai"	S.S. Thaman	Naveen Madhav
2013	Arrambam	Tamil	"Stylish Thamizhachi"	Yuvan Shankar Raja	Yuvan Shankar Raja, Rubba Bend (Psycho Unit)
2013	Yamuna	Tamil	"Dimba Dimba"	Elakkiyan	
2013	Pattathu Yaanai (Telugu version)	Telugu	"Kottandi Raa"	S.S. Thaman	Yazin Nizar
2013	Vaalu	Tamil	"Engaathan Porrandha"	S.S. Thaman	Silambarasan, M. M. Monisha
2014	Legend	Telugu	"Om Sarvani"	Devi Sri Prasad	
2014	Power	Telugu	"Notanki Notanki"	S.S. Thaman	Ravi Teja
2014	Power	Kannada	"Why Why (YY)"	S.S. Thaman	Naveen Madhav
2014	Anjaan	Tamil	"Sirippu En"	Yuvan Shankar Raja	
2014	Aaha Kalyanam	Telugu	"The Punch Song"	Dharan Kumar	Nivas
2014	Aagadu	Telugu	"Bhelpuri"	S.S. Thaman	Sooraj Santhosh
2014	Govindudu Andarivadele	Telugu	"Kokkokkodi"	Yuvan Shankar Raja	Haricharan, Karthik, Rita
2014	Race Gurram	Telugu	"Race Gurram"	S.S. Thaman	Usha Uthup, M. M. Monisha
2014	Meaghamann	Tamil	"Meaghamann"	S.S. Thaman	M. M. Monisha
2014	Meaghamann	Tamil	"Meaghamann - Theme Music"	S.S. Thaman	M. M. Monisha
2014	Bramman	Tamil	"Un Kannai"	Devi Sri Prasad	Karthik
2014	Tamizhuku En Ondrai Azhuthavum	Tamil	"Robo Romeo"	S.S. Thaman	M. M. Monisha
2014	Virattu	Telugu	"Meeta Paanu"	Dharan Kumar	Santhosh Hariharan
2014	Current Theega	Telugu	"Ammay Nadumu"	Achu Rajamani	Achu Rajamani
2014	Kurai Ondrum Illai	Tamil	"Kadhal Mazhyil"	Ramanu	Chinmayi, M. M. Monisha, Bhargavi
2014	Vanmam	Tamil	"Aetti Enga Porae"	S.S. Thaman	Nivas
2015	Bhaag Johnny	Hindi	"Daddy Mummy"	Devi Sri Prasad	Devi Sri Prasad
2015	Kaaki Sattai	Tamil	"Kattikida"	Anirudh Ravichander	Anirudh Ravichander, Anthony Daasan, Anitha Karthikeyan
2015	Puli	Tamil	"Sottavaala"	Devi Sri Prasad	Shankar Mahadevan
2015	Akhil	Telugu	"Padessavae"	S.S. Thaman	Karthik
2015	S/O Satyamurthy	Telugu	"Jaaruko"	Devi Sri Prasad	Sagar
2015	Jadoogadu	Telugu	"Gola Cheddame"	Mahati Swara Sagar	Sweekar Agasthi
2015	Shivam	Telugu	"Gunde Aagi Pothaande"	Devi Sri Prasad	Vedala Hemachandra
2015	Sakalakala Vallavan	Tamil	"Buji Ma Buji Ma"	S.S. Thaman	D. Imman, S.S. Thaman
2015	Sakalakala Vallavan	Tamil	"Hit-u Song"	S.S. Thaman	STR, Remya Nambeesan, M. M. Monisha
2015	Kumari 21F	Telugu	"Break Up Patch Up"	Devi Sri Prasad	
2015	Massu Engira Masilamani	Tamil	"Sema Masss"	Yuvan Shankar Raja	Nivas
2015	Rakshasudu	Telugu	"Super Masss"	Yuvan Shankar Raja	Nivas
2015	Yagavarayinum Naa Kaakka	Tamil	"Papparapampam"	Prasan Praveen Shyam	Krishna Iyer, Benny Dayal
2015	Beeruva	Telugu	"Cheliya Cheliya"	S. Thaman	Deepak
2015	Sher	Telugu	"Napere Pinky"	S. Thaman	Simha
2015	Uppu Karuvaadu	Tamil	"Uppu Karuvadu"	Steeve Vatz	
2015	Gaddam Gang	Telugu	"Vedi Indlo"	Achu Rajamani	
2015	Savaale Samaali	Tamil	"Yaaro Yaaro"	S. Thaman	
2016	Sardaar Gabbar Singh	Telugu	"Tauba Tauba"	Devi Sri Prasad	Nakaash Aziz
2016	Tharai Thappattai	Tamil	"Aattakaari Maaman Ponnu"	Ilaiyaraaja	Prasanna
2016	Garam	Telugu	"Chilaka Paapa"	Agasthya	Suchith Suresan
2016	Sarrainodu	Telugu	"Private Party"	S. Thaman	S. Thaman
2016	Kallattam	Tamil	"Raa Rarandi"	Umar Ezhilan	H. Shahjahan
2016	Arthanari	Tamil	"Kai Veesi Nadakkum"	V. Selvaganesh	Karthik
2016	Arthanari	Tamil	"Mandira Vizhiyal"	V. Selvaganesh	
2016	Abbayitho Ammayi	Telugu	"Saradale"	Ilaiyaraaja	Ramya, Rita, Reena Reddy
2016	Achamindri	Tamil	"Unna Parthathala"	Premgi Amaren	Abhilash
2016	Kootathil Oruthan	Tamil	"Nee Indri"	Nivas K. Prasanna	
2017	Velaiilla Pattadhari 2	Tamil	"Iraivanai Thandha Iraiviye"	Sean Roldan	Sean Roldan
2017	Vanamagan	Tamil	"Damn Damn"	Harris Jayaraj	
2017	Jaya Janaki Nayaka	Telugu	"Let's Party All Night"	Devi Sri Prasad	Prudhvi Chandra
2017	Vivegam	Tamil	"Veriyera"	Anirudh Ravichandar	Poorvi Koutish
2017	Mahanubhavudu	Telugu	"Mahanubhavudavera"	S. Thaman	Geetha Madhuri
2017	Sangili Bungili Kadhava Thorae	Tamil	"Ek Gau Mein"	Vishal Chandrasekhar	Silambarasan
2017	Sapthagiri LLB	Telugu	"Are Are Ek Dham"	Vijay Bulganin	Bulganin, Divya Kumar
2017	Kootathil Oruthan	Tamil	"Nee Indri"	Nivas K. Prasanna	
2017	Vunnadhi Okate Zindagi	Telugu	"Rayyi Rayyi Mantu"	Devi Sri Prasad	Divya Kumar
2018	Riya (Web series)	English	"Daddy and Daughter"	Brian D. Kelley	
2018	Rangasthalam	Telugu	"Rangamma Mangamma"	Devi Sri Prasad	
2018	Saamy 2	Tamil	"Adhiroobaney"	Devi Sri Prasad	
2018	Padi Padi Leche Manasu	Telugu	"Urike Cheli Chilaka"	Vishal Chandrasekhar	Rahul Sipligunj
2018	Next Enti?	Telugu	"Oh No Never!"	Leon James	Ash King
2018	Evanukku Engeyo Matcham Irukku	Tamil	"O Surekha"	Natarajan Sankaran	
2018	Tamizh Padam 2	Tamil	"Ulagam Athira Vaada"	N Kannan	
2018	Ghajinikanth	Tamil	"Hola Hola"	Balamurali Balu	Benny Dayal, Christopher Stanley
2018	Maari 2	Tamil	"Maari's Aanandhi"	Yuvan Shankar Raja	Ilaiyaraaja
2019	Vinaya Vidheya Rama	Telugu	"Tassadiyya"	Devi Sri Prasad	Jaspreet Jasz
2019	F2 - Fun and Frustration	Telugu	"Girra Girra"	Devi Sri Prasad	Sagar
2019	Udyama Simham	Telugu	"Dibiri Gola"	Dileep Bandari	
2019	Kazhugu 2	Tamil	"Yelamala Kathu"	Yuvan Shankar Raja	
2019	Maharshi	Telugu	"Paalapitta"	Devi Sri Prasad	Rahul Sipligunj
2019	Chanakya	Telugu	"Hookah Bar-U"	Vishal Chandrashekhar	
2019	Rustum	Kannada	"Singaaravva"	Anoop Seelin	
2019	Mismatch	Telugu	"Arere"	Gifton Elias	
2019	Raju Gari Gadhi 3	Telugu	"Naa Gadhiloki Raa"	Shabir	Sri Vardhini, Thanushree Natarajan, Miraya Varma, LV Revanth, Shabir
2019	90ML	Telugu	"Singilu Singilu"	Anup Rubens	Rahul Sipligunj
2020	Oh My Kadavule	Tamil	"Friendship Anthem"	Leon James	Leon James, Anirudh Ravichander
2020	Sandimuni	Tamil	"Kandangi En Manasukulla"	A. K. Rishalsai	Jithinraj
2021	Choo Mandhirakaali	Tamil	"Kodaali Kannaala"	Satish Raghunathan	Anand Aravindakshan
2022	Vaaitha	Tamil	"Paarvai Vanna Noolai Pola"	Logeshwaran C	Chinmayi, M Krishnaraj
2022	Naam 2	Tamil	"Ora Siricha"	Stephen Zechariah	Srinisha Jayaseelan
2022	Lucky Man	Kannada	"Friendship Song"	V2 Vijay Vicky	Adithya R K
2023	Varisu	Tamil	"Ranjithame"	Thaman S	Vijay
2023	Michael	Tamil	"Pammare"	Sam C. S.	
2025	Laila	Telugu	"Icchukundam Baby"	Leon James	Adithya R K
2025	Patang	Telugu	"Andala Tarakasi"	Jose Jimmy	Jassie Gift

=== As a dubbing artist ===
Year	Film	Language	Actress
2013	Nirnayam	Tamil	Regina Cassandra
2013	Idharkuthane Aasaipattai Balakumara	Tamil	Swathi Reddy
2014	Vadacurry	Tamil	Swathi Reddy
2014	Arima Nambi	Tamil	Lekha Washington
2014	Vanmam	Tamil	Sunainaa
2014	Anjaan	Tamil	Samantha Ruth Prabhu
2014	Meaghamann	Tamil	Hansika Motwani
2014	Thirumanam Ennum Nikkah	Tamil	Nazriya Nazim
2015	Darling	Tamil	Nikki Galrani
2015	Tamiluku En Ondrai Aluthavum	Tamil	Bindu Madhavi
2015	Nanbenda	Tamil	Sherin Shringar
2015	Nanbenda	Tamil	Tamannah Bhatia
2015	Vai Raja Vai	Tamil	Taapsee Pannu
2015	Baahubali: The Beginning	Tamil	Tamannaah Bhatia
2015	Thani Oruvan	Tamil	Mugdha Godse
2015	Savaale Samaali	Tamil	Bindu Madhavi
2015	Maari	Tamil	Kajal Agarwal
2015	Nava Manmadhudu	Telugu (Dubbed version)	Amy Jackson
2015	Uppu Karuvaadu	Tamil	Nandita Swetha
2015	Valiyavan	Tamil	Andrea Jeremiah
2016	Miruthan	Tamil	Lakshmi Menon
2016	Vaaliba Raja	Tamil	Nushrat Bharucha
2016	Vetrivel	Tamil	Varsha Bollamma
2016	Iraivi	Tamil	Kamalinee Mukherjee
2016	Jackson Durai	Tamil	Bindu Madhavi
2016	Thozha	Tamil	Tamannaah Bhatia
2016	Dharma Durai	Tamil	Tamannaah Bhatia
2016	Velainu Vandhutta Vellaikaaran	Tamil	Nikki Galrani
2016	Iru Mugan	Telugu (Dubbed version)	Nayanthara
2016	Devi	Tamil	Tamannaah Bhatia
2016	Kodi	Tamil	Trisha
2017	Vizhithiru	Tamil	Erica Fernandes
2017	Maanagaram	Tamil	Regina Cassandra
2017	Kuttram 23	Tamil	Mahima Nambiar
2017	Baahubali: The Conclusion	Tamil	Tamannaah Bhatia
2017	Ulkuthu	Tamil	Nandita Swetha
2018	Nadigaiyar Thilagam	Tamil	Samantha Ruth Prabhu
2018	Mohini	Tamil	Trisha
2019	Devi 2	Tamil	Tamannaah Bhatia
2019	Sye Raa Narasimha Reddy	Tamil (Dubbed version)	Tamannaah Bhatia
2019	Petromax	Tamil	Tamannaah Bhatia
2019	100% Kadhal	Tamil	Shalini Pandey
2020	Oh My Kadavule	Tamil	Ritika Singh
2021	Nenjam Marappathillai	Tamil	Nandita Swetha
2022	Maaran	Tamil	Malavika Mohanan
2022	The Legend	Tamil	Geethika Tiwari
2022	Ponniyin Selvan: I	Kannada (Dubbed Version)	Aishwarya Rai Bachchan
2023	Ponniyin Selvan: II	Kannada (Dubbed Version)	Aishwarya Rai Bachchan
2023	Vaarasudu (Varisu)	Telugu (Dubbed version)	Rashmika Mandanna
2023	Run Baby Run	Tamil	Isha Talwar
2024	Singapore Saloon	Tamil	Meenakshi Chaudhary
2024	Aranmanai 4	Tamil	Tamannaah Bhatia
2024	Indian 2	Tamil	Rakul Preet Singh
2024	The Greatest Of All Time	Tamil	Meenakshi Chaudhary
2025	Odela 2	Tamil (Dubbed version)	Tamannaah Bhatia

=== Television title songs ===
Series Name	Year	Song name	Channel
Roja	2018	"Kavithaipole Vanthale Roja"	Sun TV
Abhiyum Naanum	2021	"Kannil Pokinra Nir"	Sun TV
Namma Veetu Ponnu	2021	TBA	Vijay TV
