= 2.0 (soundtrack) =

2017 soundtrack album by A. R. Rahman

2.0 (Original Motion Picture Soundtrack)
- Soundtrack album cover

Soundtrack album by A. R. Rahman
- Released: 27 October 2017
- Recorded: 2015–2018
- Studios: Panchathan Record Inn and AM Studios, Chennai
- Genres: Feature film soundtrack, Indian conventional music, soft rock
- Length: 14:35
- Labels: Lyca Music; Divo
- Producer: A. R. Rahman

A. R. Rahman chronology
Mersal (2017)	2.0 (Original Motion Picture Soundtrack) (2017)	Beyond the Clouds (2018)

Singles from 2.0
- 1. "Pullinangal (Bonus Track)" Released: 6 November 2018

2.0 is the soundtrack album and score for the 2018 Indian Tamil science fiction action film of the same name. A. R. Rahman composed the feature film soundtrack and background score. The lyrics for the songs has been penned by Madhan Karky, Na. Muthukumar in Tamil.

Rahman was chosen to compose the songs, during the pre-production works of the film in December 2015. The recording process for the songs and original score, took place for nearly four years. The soundtrack album was launched at a promotional event held on 27 October 2017, at Burj Al Arab, Dubai, where the film's cast and crew and other celebrities attended the event. Two songs from the movie was released in Tamil, and also the dubbed versions in Telugu and Hindi, on the same day and A bonus track was released on 6 November 2018, in Tamil as well as the dubbed versions in Telugu and Hindi. The album received generally positive reviews from critics.

== Development ==
In 2015, during pre-production phase of the film, it was announced that A. R. Rahman would be composing the soundtrack and original score of 2.0.

In an interview with Archana Chandhok on Zee Tamil, Rajinikanth revealed that director Shankar wanted to make 2.0 without any songs. Plans for recording a title track and a background song failed. The track "Enthira Logathu Sundariye" made its way after taking into account that the screenplay of the film was entirely subject-oriented and moves at a frenetic pace. Keeping audiences in consideration, a "breather" form of a song was recorded. However, Rahman was still not convinced and felt that an album should have a minimum of four songs to provide listeners with a wholesome experience.

In an interview with Press Trust of India, Rahman stated that 2.0 was a tough film to score. Recording of "Endhira Logathu Sundariye" was completed by early August 2017. The song, reported as a romantic number with dance included, was shot indoors in a 12-day schedule in August 2017. Recording of the Hindi version ("Mechanical Sundariye") of the track was completed on 29 October 2017. The Hindi version of "Pullinangal" titled "Nanhi Si Jaan" was recorded in June 2018. About this, Rahman stated that he initially wanted to release more background themes rather than songs.

== Overview ==
Endhira Logathu Sundariye

Madhan Karky's lyrics in the duet Endhira Logathu Sundariye speak of a romance between a male and a female robot. "En uyire uyire batteriye, enai nee piriyaadhae" (My life, my life battery, do not leave me) or "Hey minsara samsarame" (My electronic wife) are in line with 2.0's storyline. Armaan Malik and Shashaa Tirupati have sung the Hindi version, while Sid Sriram and the latter have sung the Tamil and Telugu versions. The composition is not forgettable, but the trap music arrangement and the techno bleeps and bloops do come in way of the melody. There are subtle differences, lyrically, between the Tamil and the Hindi versions, that reveal how the makers perceive audiences in the South and the Hindi belt. If Endhira Logathu Sundariye has Sriram singing "Un bus-in conductor naan" (I am your bus conductor), in Mechanical Sundariye, written by Abbas Tyrewala, Malik sings "Hoon super conductor main" (I am a super conductor) – the idea being that Tamil audiences will appreciate the reference to Rajinikanth's early days.

Raajali

Raajali is an anthem-like number that celebrates the triumph of good over evil, a typical sentiment in Rajinikanth movies. The song begins with a reference to science fiction author Isaac Asimov ("Isaac Asimov peran daa" – grandson of Isaac Asimov).

Pullinangal

Pullinangal is designed as an ode to birds. It is a theme song for the bird-loving villain, with the tune designed to draw sympathy for him. Free from the mandate to be a theatre-shattering Rajinikanth song, the Pullinangal's arrangement contains strings, a simple synthetic beat, piano, and recordings of bird sounds.

Though it is a love song that is ultimately not for a person, the singers (AR Ameen and Suzanne D’Mello sing all three versions, accompanied by Bamba Bakya in Tamil, Kailash Kher in Hindi, and fellow composer MM Keeravani in Telugu) sing their heart out, bringing an emotional weight missing from the other two tracks.

== Release ==
A promotional music event for the film was held at Burj Al Arab, Dubai on 27 October 2017, with Rajinikanth, Akshay Kumar, Amy Jackson, composer A. R. Rahman, director Shankar, producer Subaskaran and the film's entire technical crew, along with Dhanush, Aishwarya R. Dhanush, Kamal Hassan and other celebrities attended the event. The event was hosted together by RJ Balaji, Rana Daggubati and Karan Johar. The album features two songs "Endhira Logathu Sundhariye" and "Rajaali". Both these tracks were released on digital music platforms the same day. A. R. Rahman and his music team performed these two songs and an additional track "Pullinangal" at the event. A symphony of an estimated 125 musicians was present to perform live. The audio launch event was telecasted on 19 November 2017 on Zee Tamil, and also telecasted once again on 2 December 2017 on News18 Tamil Nadu. The track "Pullinangal" was released as a part of the soundtrack album on 6 November 2018.

== Reception ==
Behindwoods gave 3.25/5 rating to the album & wrote A.R.Rahman churns out yet another powerful album that seems to be binding with the story whilst adding to its 2.0's grandeur.

Srinivasa Ramanujam, from The Hindu, reviewed the soundtrack album, stating that "The focus of Rahman's work in these two released songs for the Shankar-Rajinikanth film clearly seems to be on providing a futuristic soundscape rather than concentrating on tune – perhaps aligning with the sci-fi elements in the script."

M Suganth, from The Times of India, reviewed the album, summarising it "As with Endhiran, Rahman has come up with songs that are global in sounding, but still distinctly local with 2.0."

A reviewer from Firstpost reviewed the song "Endhira Logathu Sundhariye", stating that "Shashaa Tirupati kickstarts the song on a mysterious note and in trademark Robot style. Then, we are transported into lots of techno, groovy beats and some subtle melody as well. And suddenly, it strikes you. What stands out in the midst of this typical AR Rahman-Rajini track is Sid Sriram's vocals. The singer is a breath of fresh air in this album which otherwise has nothing we have not already heard of, and also reviewing "Raajali" as "the track that uplifts the soul of the movie. It is evident, through the pace of the track, that it is tailor-made for Rajini's role. One can typically imagine the superstar in a larger than life setup with this one. We must say, Rajali' might just be the 'Irumbile Oru Idhaiyam' (Enthiran) of 2.0. Sid Sriram, who is the new Arijit Singh of the South industry, is definitely the highlight of this album yet again. The singer who otherwise was known for his addictive melodies like "Yennai Matrum Kadhale" and the latest hit "Maruvaarthai" has proved that he can be the voice behind such peppy and high techno songs too". Finally the reviewer gave a verdict, stating that "The 2.0 songs released so far are a feast for Rajini's audience. The tracks are tailor-made for a plot like 2.0's. But we sure have heard better from Rahman. And yet, the "Neruppu Da" feels from Rajini's last outing Kabali, is yet to be witnessed in this jukebox".

== Track listing ==
2.0 (Original Motion Picture Soundtrack) - Tamil
No.	Title	Lyrics	Singer(s)	Length
1.	"Endhira Logathu Sundariye"	Madhan Karky	Sid Sriram, Shashaa Tirupati	5:30
2.	"Raajali"	Madhan Karky	Blaaze, Arjun Chandy, Sid Sriram	4:12
3.	"Pullinangal"	Na. Muthukumar	Bamba Bakya, A. R. Ameen, Suzanne D'Mello	4:53
Total length:				14:35

2.0 (Original Motion Picture Soundtrack) - Telugu
No.	Title	Lyrics	Singer(s)	Length
1.	"Yanthara Lokapu Sundarive"	Ananta Sriram	Sid Sriram, Shashaa Tirupati	5:30
2.	"Randali"	Bhaskarabhatla Ravikumar	Blaaze, Arjun Chandy, Nivas	4:13
3.	"Bulliguvaa"	Ananta Sriram	M. M. Keeravani, A. R. Ameen, Suzanne D'Mello	4:52
Total length:				14:35

2.0 (Original Motion Picture Soundtrack) - Hindi
No.	Title	Lyrics	Singer(s)	Length
1.	"Mechanical Sundariye"	Amitabh Bhattacharya	Armaan Malik, Shashaa Tirupati	5:30
2.	"Rakshassi"	Abbas Tyrewala	Blaaze, Kailash Kher, Nakash Aziz	4:12
3.	"Nanhi Si Jaan"	Abbas Tyrewala	Kailash Kher, A. R. Ameen, Suzanne D'Mello	4:52
Total length:				14:35

== Background score ==
2.0 (Original Background Score)

Film score by A. R. Rahman
- Released: 29 June 2019
- Recorded: 2015–2018
- Studios: Panchathan Record Inn and AM Studios, Chennai
- Genre: Feature film score
- Length: 39:18
- Labels: Lyca Music; Divo
- Producer: A. R. Rahman

Recording of the original score began in London and Rahman's Los Angeles studios in 2016. Unlike previous projects, Rahman began finalising the original background score six months back prior to release because he felt that the scenes were very heavy and it needed a lot of work. The official film score consists of fifteen tracks with nearly a duration of nearly forty minutes. The film score was marketed and released on 29 June 2019.

2.0 (Original Background Score)
No.	Title	Length
1.	"Eerie Flapping"	1:41
2.	"Its Over"	0:18
3.	"Will You Believe"	2:24
4.	"Shadow's Journey"	1:32
5.	"We Need Chitti"	4:40
6.	"You Are Next"	2:56
7.	"Army Attack"	2:31
8.	"Interval"	3:40
9.	"Nila's Espionage"	1:12
10.	"Grand Son"	1:00
11.	"Let The Game Begins"	2:46
12.	"The Unknown"	3:07
13.	"You Will Be Avenged"	2:02
14.	"Replication"	1:08
15.	"Pakshirajan's Story"	6:31
Total length:		39:18

== Album credits ==
Credits adapted from official website.

=== Producer(s) ===
A. R. Rahman

=== Songwriter(s) ===
- A. R. Rahman (Composer & Arranger)
- Madhan Karky, Na. Muthukumar, Abbas Tyrewala, Amitabh Bhattacharya, Ananta Sriram, Bhaskarabhatla Ravikumar, Blaaze (Lyrics)

=== Performer(s) ===
A. R. Rahman, Sid Sriram, Shashaa Tirupati, Blaaze, Arjun Chandy, Bamba Bakya, A. R. Ameen, Suzanne D'Mello, Nivas, M. M. Keeravani, Armaan Malik, Kailash Kher

=== Musicians ===
- Guitar - Keba Jeremiah, Rex Vijayan, Chris Jason, Warren Mendonsa
- Keyboards, Live Drums & Brass - Geoff Foster
- Flute - Naveen Kumar, Kareem Kamalakar
- Live Rhythm - Lakshmi Narayanan, Raju, Vedha, T Raja, Krishna Kishore
- Orchestra - Chennai Strings Orchestra
- Strings - Sunshine Orchestra (conducted by V. J. Srinivasa Murthy)

=== Backing vocals ===
Deepthi Suresh, Veena Murali, Sowmya, Deepak Blue, Aravind Srinivas, Maalavika Sundar, Santhosh Hariharan, Niranjana Ramanan, Narayanan, Srinivas, Suryansh, Lavita Lobo, Aishwarya Kumar, Nakul Abhyankar, Shravan Sridhar, Srinivasan

=== Additional vocals ===
Arjun Chandy, Shenbagaraj, Nivas, Soundarya, Narayanan, Deepak Blue, Akshara, Madhura Dhara Talluri, Nakul Abhayankar, Shashwat Singh

=== Personnel ===
Music Supervisor

Ishaan Chhabra

Additional Programming

TR Krishna Chetan, Kumaran Sivamani, Ishaan Chhabra, Santosh Dhayanidhi, Pawan CH, Hari Dafusia, AH Kaashif, Jerry Vincent, Jim Sathya

=== Sound Engineers ===
- Panchathan Record Inn, Chennai - Suresh Permal, Karthik Sekaran, Srinidhi Venkatesh, Ishaan Chhabra, Jerry Vincent, Santosh Dhayanidhi, Vinay Sridhar, AH Kaashif
- AM Studios, Chennai - S Sivakumar, Pradeep, Kannan Ganpat, Anantha Krishnan, Manoj, Srinath
- Panchathan Hollywood Studios, Los Angeles - Tony Joy, Kevin Doucette

=== Production ===
- Mixed by - TR Krishna Chetan
- Mastered by - Suresh Permal
- Musicians Coordinators - Vijay Iyer, TM Faizuddin, Noell James, Abdul Haiyum
- Musicians Fixer - R Samidurai
