= WeMove Theatre =

Theatre company in Bangalore, India

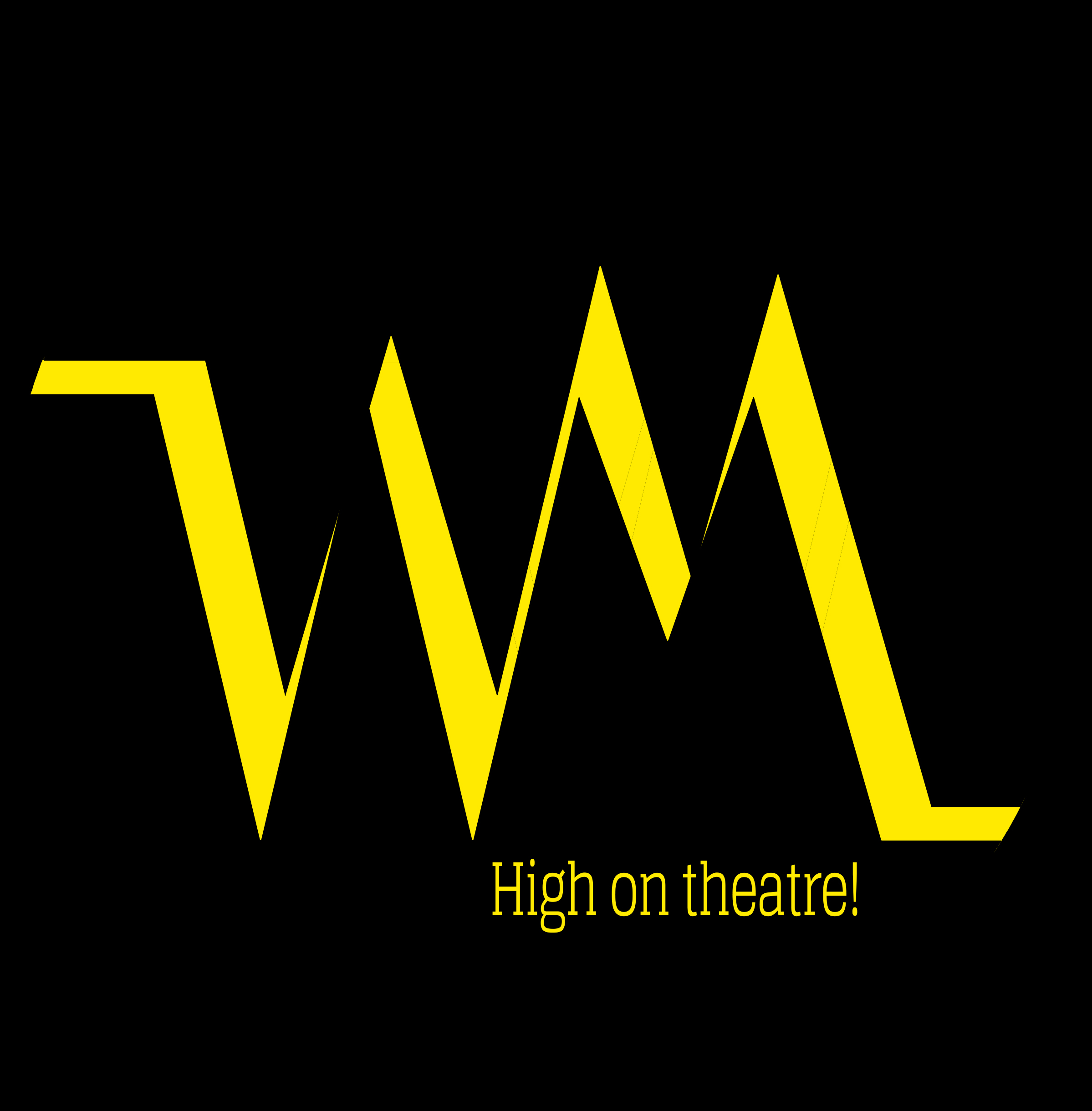
- WeMove Theatre logo
- Address: 110/A, 29th Cross Rd, 7th Block, Jayanagar, Bengaluru; Bangalore; India
- Owner: Abhishek Iyengar & Rangaraj Bhatracharya
- Type: Provincial

Construction
- Opened: September 2006

Website
- wemovetheatre.in

WeMove Theatre is Bangalore-based theatre company. It is located in the south Bangalore area of Jayanagar and is run by the Independent Board consisting of members Abhishek Iyengar and Rangaraj Bhatracharya.

It aims at proving a platform for individuals who wants to express through the medium of theatre. It believes in the policy Theatre For All (works through Monday to Sunday). it has staged over 350+ stage performances in both Kannada and English since inception, most of the plays are known for their contemporary issues revolving around stories of common man thus connecting more at an emotional level to the audience.

== Objectives ==
WeMove Theatre believes in Theatre for All . It aims to

- Showcase Quality Contemporary theatrical performances in India and abroad
- Produce and commission new and innovative theatre forms and productions which deal with stories of Common Man
- Create theatre programs to build audiences for theatre and to impart theatre skills

.

=== WeMove Theatre Black Box studio ===
WeMove Theatre studio is the space with a floor area of 800 square ft, with some basic facilities to store properties. It is at this space where artists of diverse backgrounds come together to explore and make strong work of theatre. Concept of Blackbox is used to create work in this studio space

=== The Big Step ===
Big step is a theatre intervention program aimed at promoting to practice the art of theatre. Interested, passionate people with the intention to learn theatre enroll for a one-day workshop to understand the nuances of what goes into making a theatre play. Recently, Big step programs branched out of Bangalore into California, Hyderabad, Pune, and Chennai. Big step program provides a brief chance to perform right after the workshop with all the participants thus imparting everything that was experienced.

== Malgudi Days and other productions ==
WeMove has in total stages 14 theatre productions in English and Kannada. Malgudi Days, being the most popular Kannada satire play of WeMove was recently staged in California by a theatre group based out of the Bay Area called Nataka Chaitra.

Some of the other popular productions of WeMove include E=MC2 E=mc2 was premiered in 2015 Sonu portrayed the female protagonist in the play.

Some of the other productions include adaptations from R.K Narayan's Malgudi Days as Malgudi Express in which popular Kannada actress Radhika Chetan essayed an important role. This was in English adapted from the book

Namma Metro was WeMove's first contemporary Kannada play premiered in 2010 which saw more than 25 Performances.

Some of the other productions include the English play Cocktail, and the most recent production is a Kannada play called Sambhandagala Sutta.
