= Mappillai (2011 film) =

2011 film directed by Suraj

- Theatrical release poster
- Directed by: Suraj
- Screenplay by: Mayank Jain
- Story by: A. Kodandarami Reddy
- Based on: Attaku Yamudu Ammayiki Mogudu (1989)
- Produced by: Nemichand Jhabak; Hitesh Jhabak
- Starring: Dhanush; Hansika Motwani; Manisha Koirala
- Cinematography: S. R. Sathish Kumar
- Edited by: Kishore Te.
- Music by: Mani Sharma
- Production company: Nemichand Jhabak
- Distributed by: Sun Pictures
- Release date: 8 April 2011
- Country: India
- Language: Tamil

Mappillai (transl. Son-in-law / Bridegroom) is a 2011 Indian Tamil-language masala film directed by Suraj, starring Dhanush as the son-in-law and Manisha Koirala as the mother-in-law along with actress Hansika Motwani (in her Tamil debut), playing as her daughter. The film is a remake of the 1989 film of the same name, which itself was based on the Telugu film Attaku Yamudu Ammayiki Mogudu. The music was composed by Mani Sharma with editing by Kishore Te. and cineamtography by S. R. Sathish Kumar. The film released on 8 April 2011 to mixed reviews and was a decent hit at the box office.

== Plot ==
Saravanan is a do-gooder who is soft-spoken and admired by one and all. Another person named Child Chinna is the head of the Namitha Fan Club in his area. The two of them come across Gayathri, the daughter of an arrogant businesswoman named Rajeshwari. Chinna falls for Gayathri, so he tries several plans to get close to her, but in vain.

Gayathri falls for Saravanan after he saves her from an accident. Coming to know of their affair, Rajeshwari decides to have them marry. The reason is that she is keen on getting a son-in-law who will always do what she wants and be under her control.

However, Rajeshwari is in for a shock when she learns that Saravanan has a past. He is a much feared ruffian. Now she plans to halt all plans, while Saravanan overcomes her plans with ease. Rajeshwari takes steps to get her daughter Gayathri married to Devaraj's son Aathi. Saravanan challenges Rajeshwari to abduct the bride. But at a time when none of them expected the wedding, he kidnaps the groom. In the confusion of Devaraj rescuing his son, Saravanan defies Rajeshwari and ties the thaali around Gayathri's neck with her consent on the same stage in front of everyone. Later, Rajeshwari takes Saravanan to her house with his wife Gayathri. Rajeshwari tries not to let the two live together. But, Saravanan breaks it all and starts his married life with Gayathri.

At last, he learns that Rajeshwari had humiliated his parents when they ask her to accompany them to their village festival. He makes a plan to take her whole family to his village and make them stay there in his ancestral house with the help of Rajeshwari's astrologer, and further, he plans to arrange for his sister's marriage with Rajeshwari's son. Saravanan requests his friend Chinna to act a wealthy businessman named James Pandian, to which Chinna agrees. Later, Rajeshwari knows the truth about James. She insults him and his family in front of the whole village and leaves.

Later, she and Gayathri are caught by some goons, but Saravanan saves them and reconciles with his family.

== Cast ==
- Dhanush as Saravanan
- Hansika Motwani as Gayathri
- Manisha Koirala as Rajeshwari
- Vivek as Child Chinna / James Pandiyan / Youth
- Ashish Vidyarthi as Devaraj
- Sathyan as Chinna's friend
- Pattimandram Raja as Saravanan's father
- Sriranjani as Saravanan's mother
- Dr. Sharmila as Saravanan's sister
- Thadi Balaji as Chinna's friend
- Cell Murugan as Chinna's friend
- Kadhal Dhandapani as Industrialist
- Manobala as Rajeshwari's astrologer
- Chitti Babu as Rajeshwari's PA
- Madhan Bob as Rajeshwari's assistant
- Thyagu as Chinna's assistant
- Aryan as Aathi
- Vichu Vishwanath as Saravanan's brother-in-law
- Maran as Ravi
- Vaiyapuri
- Munnar Ramesh
- Jasper
- Rajendranath
- Baba Bhaskar (special appearance in the song "Onnu Rendu")
- Erina Andriana (special appearance in the song "Onnu Rendu")
- Ramesh Thilak (uncredited role)

== Production ==
Manisha Koirala plays Dhanush's mother-in-law, making a return to Tamil films after Baba (2002). Hansika Motwani played the lead actress, making her Tamil debut. Dhanush tried to avoid imitating Rajinikanth's mannerisms from the original film and instead bring his own style.

== Soundtrack ==
The soundtrack is scored by Mani Sharma. The audio was launched at Kamarajar Arangam on 11 March 2011, and telecast on Sun TV on 27 March 2011. The audio was marketed by Sony Music India.

The song "Ennoda Raasi" was recreated from the 1989 film. The songs "Onnu Rendu" and "Love Love" were reminiscent of Sharma's previous Telugu compositions. A remix of "Maruthamalai Maamaniye" originally sung by Madurai Somu was included in "Aaru Padai".

Track listing
No.	Title	Lyrics	Singer(s)	Length
1.	"Aaru Padai"	Viveka	Vijay Yesudas, Mukesh	04:56
2.	"Love Love" (not featured in the film)	Snehan	Rahul Nambiar, Rita	04:41
3.	"Onnu Rendu"	Pa. Vijay	Mukesh, Saindhavi	04:23
4.	"Ready Readya"	Snehan	Ranjith, Saindhavi	04:31
5.	"Ennoda Raasi" (remix)	Gangai Amaran	Ranjith	04:26
6.	"Ready Readya" (remix)	Snehan	Ranjith	03:45
7.	"Mappillai Theme" (Instrumental)	-	Ranjith	02:06
Total length:				28:48

== Reception ==
=== Critical response ===
Pavithra Srinivasan of Rediff.com gave 2.5 out of 5 describing it a "bad copy of the original", further adding that it was "just spice, humour, and plenty of silliness thrown in for good entertainment", while Aravindan D.I. of IANS stated that "it was a Romcom remake BUT Still requires some moments". N. Venkateswaran The Times of India gave 3 out of 5 and stated that "If you are among those for whom 'Mappillai' holds a lot of nostalgia, give the latest version a miss".

=== Box office ===
The film was said to have taken a good opening at the box office. At the Mayajaal multiplex on the ECR, the film had 50 shows per day and had collected a net of ₹25.3 crore (equivalent to ₹52 crore or US$5.5 million in 2023), in its opening weekend.
