= Vanmam =

2014 Indian film by Jai Krishna

- Film Poster
- Directed by: Jai Krishna
- Screenplay by: Jai Krishna
- Story by: Jai Krishna
- Produced by: Nemichand Jhabak; V. Hitesh Jhabak
- Starring: Vijay Sethupathi; Kreshna; Sunaina
- Cinematography: Bala Bharani
- Edited by: Suresh Urs
- Music by: S. Thaman
- Production company: Jhabaks Films
- Release date: 21 November 2014
- Running time: 156 minutes
- Country: India
- Language: Tamil

Vanmam (transl. Vengeance) is a 2014 Indian Tamil-language action drama film written and directed by Jai Krishna, a former assistant of Kamal Haasan. It stars Vijay Sethupathi, Kreshna and Sunaina. The film has music scored by S. Thaman and cinematography by Balabharani. The film was highly panned by the critics for its poor screenplay.

== Plot ==
It is a rural tale about the life of two friends, played by Sethupathi and Kreshna.

== Cast ==
- Vijay Sethupathi as Radha
- Kreshna as Chelladurai
- Sunaina as Vadhana
- Subramaniapuram Raja as Jai Prakash
- Madhusudhan Rao as Ratnam
- Bose Venkat as Palraj
- Vazhakku En Muthuraman as Thangappan
- Anjali Rao as Hema
- Sriranjani as Nila
- Vinodhini Vaidyanathan as Palraj's wife
- Radha as Radha's mother
- Radhamani Ammal as Chelladurai's mother
- Subburaj
- Avan Ivan Ramraj as Lawyer
- Aroul D. Shankar as Inspector Sakthivel
- S. Iyappan
- V. N. O. Padmanabhan
- Praveen as Kutty
- Raandilya as Mani
- Albert Raj as Sappattai Velu

== Production ==
In August 2013, it was confirmed that Vijay Sethupathi would be doing a film with Kreshna titled Vanmam which means "vengeance". Filming began in late April 2014 in Nagercoil. and was shot in and around Kanyakumari district for about 37 days, during which 60% of the filming had been completed. Vijay Sethupathi joined the cast from the second schedule onward. The final schedule began on 15 June 2014 and ended on 10 July 2014. The action sequences were canned during the final schedule of the film. The shooting was wrapped up 3 days earlier on 7 July 2014.

== Music ==
Vanmam

Soundtrack album by S. Thaman
- Released: 2 September 2014
- Recorded: 2013–2014
- Genre: Feature film soundtrack
- Length: 18.27
- Language: Tamil
- Label: Sony Music
- Producer: S. Thaman

S. Thaman chronology
Aagadu (2014)	Vanmam (2014)	Tamizhuku En Ondrai Azhuthavum (2014)

S. Thaman composed the music for the film. The audio launch of the film was scheduled to take place on 28 August 2014, but was postponed to 2 September 2014. The audio rights were purchased by Sony Music India.

The soundtrack received mixed reviews from critics. Behindwoods wrote, "Vanmam - de-ja-vu of Thaman's earlier albums", and rated the album 1.75/5. Indiaglitz wrote, "Thaman's last release Meaghamann is a cool album with just 3 songs and a theme track. He has dished out a similar stuff in Vanmam." Karthik of Milliblog wrote, "But for occasional inventiveness, this familiar, predictable output from Thaman is distressing." Siddarth Srinivas of Cinemalead gave 2 out of 5 and concluded, "Though the autotune tsunami bashes this album to an extent, Thaman has come up with decent songs in "Manamae" and "Aetti Enga Porae". The saturation point has been breached for the composer, and its high time he comes up with innovative music. Otherwise, he better stick to the Telugu industry where he is a celebrated figure!"

=== Track list ===
All lyrics are written by Yugabharathi.

No.	Title	Singer(s)	Length
1.	"Aetti Enga Porae"	M. M. Manasi, Nivas	4:29
2.	"Paadatta Paadatta"	Hariharasudhan, Velmurugan	3:58
3.	"Manamae Manamae"	Pooja Vaidyanath, Suchith Suresan	5:19
4.	"Raasa Raasa"	M. M. Monisha	4:17
Total length:			18:03

== Critical reception ==
Baradwaj Rangan for The Hindu called Vanmam "just about the vilest thing I've sat through in recent times. The emotional beats are buried so deep they're hardly discernible, and what's on the surface is a generic mix of love and drama and sentiment and action. There's not a thing that's new". The Times of India gave the film 2.5 stars out of 5 and wrote, "The worrying bit about the film is that nothing feels really at stake. The director, who nicely captures milieu, hasn't done so when it comes to characters and plot. The result is that the film often seems like a morality drama turned into a rural masala". Sify wrote, "It is a story that has been told from time immemorial, and there is nothing fresh in presentation or treatment. And terrible screenplay aggravates the misery" going on to call it a "clichéd long and boring movie". Rediff wrote, "Director Jai Krishna's Vanmham is just another ordinary, highly predictable and melodramatic revenge drama that seriously tests your patience".

In contrast, The New Indian Express wrote, "Weaving a fairly engaging tale and moving his narration with focus and assurance, the director establishes his credentials in his very first effort".
