= S. R. Sathish Kumar =

Indian cinematographer

- Born: Trichirappali, Tamil Nadu, India
- Occupation: Director of photography

S. R. Sathish Kumar is an Indian cinematographer, who has worked in the Tamil and Hindi film industries.

== Career ==
S. R. Sathish Kumar worked with his friend and fellow cinematographer, N. K. Ekambaram, before getting his first opportunity as a senior cinematographer. Sathish Kumar worked with S. P. Jananathan on the action adventure film, Peraanmai (2009). He worked on the production of Meaghamann (2014), earning critical acclaim for his work.

== Filmography ==
Year	Film	Language	Notes
2008	Theekuchi	Tamil	
2009	Peraanmai	Tamil	
2011	Mappillai	Tamil	
2013	Story Kathe	Kannada	
2014	Desi Kattey	Hindi	
2014	Meaghamann	Tamil	
2015	Bhooloham	Tamil	
2016	Wagah	Tamil	
2017	Kadamban	Tamil	
2018	Nanu Ki Jaanu	Hindi	
2020	Bunker	Hindi	
2025	Rajabheema	Tamil	
