= Attaku Yamudu Ammayiki Mogudu =

1989 film by A. Kodandarami Reddy

- Theatrical release Poster
- Directed by: A. Kodandarami Reddy
- Screenplay by: A. Kodandarami Reddy
- Story by: Satyanand
- Produced by: Allu Aravind
- Starring: Chiranjeevi; Vanisri; Vijayshanti; Rao Gopal Rao
- Cinematography: Lok Singh
- Edited by: M. Vellaiswamy
- Music by: K. Chakravarthy
- Production company: Geeta Arts
- Release date: 14 January 1989
- Running time: 140 minutes
- Country: India
- Language: Telugu

Attaku Yamudu Ammayiki Mogudu (transl. Husband to the girl and Yama to the mother-in-law) is a 1989 Indian Telugu-language masala film co-written and directed by A. Kodandarami Reddy. Produced by Allu Aravind, the film stars Chiranjeevi, Vanisri, and Vijayashanti. The film marks Vanisri's comeback to cinema after several years.

Released on 14 January 1989, the film was a major commercial success. It was an industry hit film at the time. It was eventually remade in Tamil twice as Maapillai (1989) and Mappillai (2011), in Kannada as Bhale Chathura (1990), in Hindi as Jamai Raja (1990), in Malayalam as Mr. Marumakan (2012), in Bengali as Sasurbari Zindabad in 2000 and in Bangladeshi Bengali as Shoshurbari Zindabad in 2002.

== Plot ==
Kalyan is an unemployed, lower-class, but simple man and a humble do-gooder. Rekha is the loving daughter of the arrogant businesswoman Chamundeswari. Kalyan, one day, ruins the engagement of Rekha's friend. Rekha at first thinks that Kalyan did this to her friend but later learns that her friend was getting married against her wish. Rekha and Kalyan later fall in love. Meanwhile, Chamundeswari rejects Kalyan's sister's love with Rekha's brother. Kalyan learns that Rekha is Chamundeswari's daughter and decides to marry Rekha. Chamundeswari holds her daughter in the house and refuses to let her go. Kalyan is enraged and challenges that he would marry Rekha. Kalyan and Chamundeswari fight over authority. The rest of the movie is about how Kalyan and Chamundeswari resolve their differences and how Kalyan wins back Rekha.

== Cast ==
- Chiranjeevi as Kalyan
- Vanisri as Chamundeswari Devi
- Vijayashanti as Rekha
- Kaikala Satyanarayana as Ramachandrayya, Chamundeswari Devi's husband
- Rao Gopal Rao
- Allu Ramalingaiah
- Brahmanandam
- Giribabu
- Sudhakar as Rekha's brother
- Annapoorna as Kalyan's mother
- Hari Prasad

== Soundtrack ==
All music is composed by K. Chakravarthy

Track list
| No. | Title | Lyrics | Singer(s) | Length |
|---|---|---|---|---|
| 1. | "Shanthi Om Shanthi Are Khaidi" | Veturi | S. P. Balasubrahmanyam, S. Janaki | 5:54 |
| 2. | "Merupula La La" | Bhuvana Chandra | S. P. Balasubrahmanyam | 4:06 |
| 3. | "Digu Digu Bhama Aa Prema" | Veturi | S. P. Balasubrahmanyam, S. Janaki | 3:42 |
| 4. | "Kalalo Pettani Muddulu Pettu" | Veturi | S. P. Balasubrahmanyam, S. Janaki | 4:20 |
| 5. | "Tinguranga Chakkanamma" | Veturi | S. P. Balasubrahmanyam, S. Janaki | 4:17 |
| Total length: | | | | 22:21 |

== Remakes ==
| Year | Film | Language | Ref. |
|---|---|---|---|
| 1989 | Mappillai | Tamil | |
| 1990 | Bhale Chathura | Kannada | |
| 1990 | Jamai Raja | Hindi | |
| 2000 | Sasurbari Zindabad | Bengali | |
| 2002 | Shoshurbari Zindabad | Bangladeshi Bengali | |
| 2011 | Mappillai | Tamil | |
| 2012 | Mr. Marumakan | Malayalam | |
