= Divo (record label) =

Indian Record Label

- Divo( Record Label) Official Logo.
- Parent company: Warner Music India
- Founded: 2013
- Founder: Shahir Muneer; Vishu Ramasamy
- Status: Active in India
- Genre: World
- Country of origin: India
- Location: Chennai
- Official website: divo.in

Divo is an Indian-based record label headquartered in Chennai, Tamil Nadu. They are known for film music and digital media productions. In 2023, Warner Music Group acquired a majority stake in Divo.

== History ==
Divo was established in 2014 by Shahir Muneer as a startup online video company in South India. The company's initial focus was on the Tamil market, which subsequently expanded to other regions within South India. Since inception, the company has worked for well known musicians including A. R. Rahman, Dhanush, Anirudh Ravichander, Yuvan Shankar Raja and many others.

In 2020, Divo expanded its offerings to include content, digital, and influencer marketing services.

In a strategic content-sharing partnership with Airtel Xstream, Divo launched the "Divo Movies" channel in 2021, bringing Tamil content to users. This collaboration allows subscribers to access Divo's catalog of Tamil films, including premieres and titles featuring actors such as Rajinikanth, Vijay, Ajith, and GV Prakash.

In 2022, the company collaborated with regional content creators to launch exclusive podcasts on Spotify in various Indian regional languages. Divo provided support in creative production, post-production, podcast operations, and promotional activities. Notable content creators onboarded include Urlo Muchatlu from the Anil Geela Podcast, Prasad from Tech In Telugu with Prasad, and regional creators such as RJ Sha, RJ Ananthi, Aranthangi Nisha, Rajmohan, Rishipedia, Kishen Das, Shanthnu & Kiki, and MaKaPa Anand.

In 2023, Warner Music Group acquired a majority stake in Divo.

== Services ==
Divo offers video and music distribution, marketing and copyright management for film studios, TV channels, musicians and music platforms. The company also offers reputation management for brands, celebrities, and films.

== Activities ==
As of 2024, Divo distributes over 30,000 music tracks. The company receives over 2 billion views monthly.

== Discography ==
Year	Film
2014	Velaiilla Pattadhari
2014	Pulivaal
2014	Oru Modhal Oru Kadhal
2014	Oru Kanniyum Moonu Kalavaanikalum
2014	Ettuthikkum Madhayaanai
2014	Vaaraayo Vennilaave
2014	Vadacurry
2014	Mei Maranthen
2014	Ramanujan
2014	Puthiathor Ulagam Seivom
2014	Vilaasam
2014	Manam Konda Kadhal
2014	Vingyani
2014	MGR Sivaji Rajini Kamal
2014	Ula
2014	Kaadu
2014	Kalai Vendhan
2014	Katham Katham
2014	1 Pandhu 4 Run 1 Wicket
2014	Soan Papdi
2014	Thunai Mudhalvar
2015	Kaaki Sattai
2015	Patra
2015	Isai
2015	Komban
2015	Kamarakattu
2015	Yoogan
2015	Avalukkenna Azhagiya Mugam
2015	Naanum Rowdy Dhaan
2015	Maaya
2015	Moondraam Ullaga Por
2015	Vandha Mala
2015	Charles Shafiq Karthiga
2016	Gethu
2016	Uyire Uyire
2016	Kuttram Kadithal
2016	Sadhuram 2
2016	Aaram Arivu
2016	Amma Kanakku
2016	Ennul Aayiram
2016	Aagam
2016	Meendum Vaa Arugil Vaa
2016	Yaanai Mel Kuthirai Sawaari
2016	Kaatu Pura
2016	Arthanaari
2016	Jackson Durai
2016	Achcham Yenbadhu Madamaiyada
2016	Kirik Party
2016	Jessie
2016	GBSM
2016	Zoom
2016	Rama Rama Re
2016	Nataraja Service
2017	Maanagaram
2017	Pa. Pandi
2017	Velaiilla Pattadhari 2
2017	Anjani Putra
2017	Happy New Year
2017	Operation Alamelamma
2017	Dayavittu Gamanisi
2017	Chamak
2018	Kaala
2018	2.0
2018	KGF 1
2018	Tagaru
2018	Sarkari Hi. Pra. Shaale
2018	Naduve Antaravirali
2018	Humble Politician Nograj
2018	Prema Baraha
2018	Amma I Love You
2018	Vaasu Naan Pakka Commercial
2018	Orange
2020	Shivaji Surathkal
2020	Darbar
2020	French Biriyani
2020	Love Mocktail
2020	Popcorn Monkey Tiger
2020	DIA
2020	Shivaji Surathkal - Part 1
2020	MayaBazar 2016
2020	Bheemasena Nalamaharaja
2021	Hero
2021	Ninna Sanihake
2021	Yuvarathnaa
2021	Garuda Gamana Vrishabha Vahana
2022	KGF 2
2022	Kantara
2022	James
2022	777 Charlie
2022	Gandhada Gudi
2022	Monsoon Raaga
2023	SSE Side A
2023	SSE Side B
2023	Tagaru Palya
2023	Dhoomam
2023	Raghavendra Stores
2023	Aachar & Co
2023	Salaar Part 1
2023	Daredevil Musthafa
2023	Orchestra Mysuru
2023	Hondisi Bareyiri
2023	Toby
2024	Indian 2
2024	Ibbani Tabbida Lleyali
2024	Bachelor Party
2024	Rasavathi
2024	O2
2024	Laughing Budha
2024	Nindha
2026	OM Chapter 1: Udhiram The Blood Wood

== See also ==
- Think Music India
- Sony Music India
