= Radhika Narayan =

Indian actress

- Born: Udupi, Karnataka, India
- Occupations: Actress, Dancer, Wellness Facilitator
- Years active: 2015–present

Radhika Narayan is an Indian actress, working primarily in mainstream Kannada cinema and Kannada theater.

== Early life ==
Radhika Narayan was born in Udupi, Karnataka. She is an engineering graduate from Vidya Vikas Institute of Engineering & Technology, Mysore. Besides being a film actress, she is a trained Kathak dancer, who was actively involved with WeMove Theatre as an actor and workshop facilitator. She has acted in several short films and concept based ad films. She has also worked as a model from earlier in her career. She was also a yoga instructor in Swami Vivekananda Yoga Anusandhana Samsthana in Bangalore.

== Career ==
In her big screen debut in Anup Bhandari's directorial Kannada thriller, critically acclaimed RangiTaranga (2015), she plays the protagonist character as Indu Suvarna, the wife of Gautam Suvarna (Nirup Bhandari). Following Rangitaranga, Radhika played a supporting role in Pawan Kumar's thriller U Turn (2016).

== Filmography ==
Key
†	Denotes films that have not yet been released

Year	Film	Role	Note	Ref
2015	RangiTaranga	Indu Suvarna / Harini	Debut Film	
2016	U Turn	Maya		
2017	BB5	Kriti		
2017	Kaafi Thota	Maithili		
2018	Hottegagi Genu Bategagi	Shravya		
2018	Asathoma Sadhgamaya	Sherlin		
2018	The Villain	Herself	Cameo appearance in a song "Bolo Bolo Ramappa"	
2019	Mundina Nildana	Meera Sharma		
2020	Shivaji Surathkal	Janani		
2022	Chase	Nidhi		
2023	Shivaji Surathkal 2	Janani		
2025	Edagaiye Apaghatakke Karana	Shraddha	Cameo appearance	
2026	Veera Kambala	Bharthi	Tulu film	
TBA	Daiji†	Bhoomi	Filming	

== Awards and nominations ==
Year	Film	Award	Category	Result
2015	RangiTaranga	1st IIFA Utsavam Award	Best Actress – Kannada	Nominated
2015	RangiTaranga	5th SIIMA Awards	Best Debutante	Nominated
2016	U Turn	6th SIIMA Awards	Best Supporting Actress	Won
2016	U Turn	2nd IIFA Utsavam	Best Supporting Actress - Kannada	Nominated
2019	Mundina Nildana	9th SIIMA Awards	Best Actress	Nominated
