= Bunker (2020 film) =

Indian war drama film

- Theatrical release poster
- Directed by: Jugal Raja
- Written by: Jugal Raja
- Produced by: Gaurav Gupta
- Starring: Abhijeet Singh; Arindita Kalita; Gaurav Gupta
- Cinematography: S. R. Sathish Kumar
- Edited by: Karan Varia
- Production companies: Wagging Tail Entertainment; Falcon Pictures
- Release date: 17 January 2020 (IND)
- Running time: 98 minutes
- Country: India
- Language: Hindi

Bunker is a 2020 Indian Hindi drama and war film directed by Jugal Raja and produced by Wagging Tail Entertainment and Falcon Pictures. Starring Abhijeet Singh, Arindita Kalita, and Gaurav Gupta, the film follows the story of a soldier trapped in a bunker at the Line of Control in Poonch, Jammu during a ceasefire violation. The film was shot predominantly on a small bunker set and completed in five days and released on 17 January 2020. It received mixed reviews and was screened at various Indian and international film festivals.

== Plot summary ==
The film follows Lieutenant Vikram Singh (played by Abhijeet Singh), the lone survivor in a bunker at the LOC in Poonch, Jammu, after it is struck by a mortar shell during a ceasefire violation. The story delves into Vikram's struggle with severe injuries and mental anguish while he awaits rescue.

== Cast and characters ==
- Abhijeet Singh as Lt. Vikram Singh
- Arindita Kalita as Swara Singh
- Gaurav Gupta as Dileep Singh Kushvaha
- Manjeet Cristina Michaus as Mujer Devavrata Ronsa
- Arnav Timsina as Yashavi Varia

== Festivals and recognition ==
95% of the film was shot in a 12 by 8 feet bunker and the entire production was completed in five days. The film was featured at several film festivals, including the Fiorenzo Serra Film Festival in Italy and the First Time Filmmaker Sessions in London. In India, it was showcased at the Jagran Film Festival in Mumbai, the Crown Wood International Film Festival in Kolkata, the Diorama International Film Festival in Delhi, and the Jaipur International Film Festival. Director Jugal Raja received the Best Emerging Director award at the Ayodhya Film Festival in Uttar Pradesh.

== Impact ==
The filmmakers announced that profits from the movie would be donated to organizations like Bharat Ke Veer and the Army Wives Welfare Association (AWWA).

== Critical reception ==
The movie received mixed reviews from critics. Pallabi Dey Purkayastha of The Times of India rated it 2 stars, stating, "This war drama is one of those stories that has its heart in the right place, but fails to keep the promises it makes".

Nandini Ramnath of Scroll mentioned that "Some sequences play out for far too long. The movie might have worked better at an even crisper duration than the 98 minutes it runs".

Shubhra Gupta of The Indian Express awarded the film 2.5 stars, noting "Some sequences go on for too long, and there are places where the lack of finesse is evident, but it works for the film. Spit and polish is strictly for uniforms: the life (and death) of a soldier is a messy thing." Ravindra Tripathi of Jansatta rated 1.5 and noted "the problem is that the story of the film has become so one sided that purpose of making it remains incomplete".
