= Aalaporaan Thamizhan =

2017 song by A. R. Rahman

- Aalaporaan Thamizhan song cover featuring actor Vijay

Song by A. R. Rahman

from the album Mersal
- Language: Tamil
- Released: 10 August 2017
- Recorded: 2017
- Studio: Panchathan Record Inn, Chennai
- Genre: Filmi, pop-folk, traditional music
- Length: 5:48
- Label: Sony Music India
- Composer: A.R. Rahman
- Lyricist: Vivek
- Producer: A.R. Rahman

Music video
- "Aalaporaan Tamizhan" on YouTube

"Aalaporaan Thamizhan"(transl. Tamils will rule) is a 2017 Indian Tamil language song composed by A. R. Rahman, from the soundtrack album of Mersal. The song's lyrics were written by Vivek and sung by Kailash Kher, Sathyaprakash, Pooja AV, and Deepak. The song's music video is pictured upon actor Vijay. The song was released as first single track of the film on 10 August 2017. As of October 2020, the video song has grossed 176 million of views in YouTube. The song portrays about the popularity of Tamil speaking people all over the world. The song features Vijay as Vetrimaaran, praising Tamil heritage and pride following a wrestling match in Punjab.

== Song credits ==
Personnel

- Composer & Producer - A. R. Rahman
- Lyrics - Vivek
- Performers - Kailash Kher, Pooja Vaidyanath, Sathyaprakash Dharmar, Deepak Blue
- Additional Vocals - Veena Murali, Maalavika, Deepthi Suresh, Soundarya, Anu Subbhaiya, Vishnupriya, Yaamini, Aishwarya Kumar

Musician

- Flute - Naveen Kumar
- Guitars - Keba Jeremiah
- Nadaswaram - D. Balasubramani
- Sitar - Kishore
- Indian Rhythm - T Raja, Kumar, Lakshmi Narayanan, Raju, Vedha, Neelakandan,
- Thavil - M Venkatesh Subramanian, Kaviraj, S Sundar, Purushothaman
- Kombu - Alex, Kali, Shankar, Viji
- Live Strings - Chennai Strings Orchestra, Sunshine Orchestra (conducted by V J Srinivasamurthy)

Sound Engineers

- Panchathan Record Inn, Chennai - Suresh Permal, Karthik Sekaran, T R Krishna Chetan, Srinidhi Venkatesh, Jerry Vincent, Santhosh Dhayanidhi, Vinay Sridhar, Ishaan Chhabra
- AM Studios, Chennai - S Sivakumar, Kannan Ganpat, Krishnan Subramanian, Pradeep Menon, Manoj Kumar

Production

- Additional Programming - T R Krishna Chetan, Kumaran Sivamani, Santhosh Dayanidhi, Hari Dafusia, Pawan CH, Kaashif AH, Jim Sathya
- Choral Arrangement - Arjun Chandy, Nakul Abhyankar
- Additional Choral Supervisor - Srinivas Doraiswamy
- Mixed by - T R Krishna Chetan
- Mastered by - Suresh Permal
- MfiT - S. Sivakumar
- Musicians Coordinators - Vijay Iyer, Noel James, TM Faizuddin
- Musicians Fixer - Samidurai R
- Music Label - Sony Music Entertainment India Pvt. Ltd.

== Reception ==
=== Critical reception ===
The Times of India stated that "[t]he song was released as the first single on August 10, 2017, and received massive applause from the audience. The number is all about Tamil pride, and that struck a chord with listeners. It used a lot of native instruments in the background score and Vivek’s lyrics spoke about the history and what it means to be a Tamizhan. Despite so many months, it remains a favourite among Vijay fans." Behindwoods wrote "Be it the folk beats, the indigenous instruments, the melodious portion delivered by Pooja or the native percussions, the song has a lot to offer. It is not an out and out mass number that is centred by folk elements but serves to be a song rich in a lot of aspects. With Rahman’s chords haunting the listener, Aalaporaan Tamizhan is an overall delight for both his fans and for fans of actor Vijay."

=== Views ===
Aalaporaan Tamizhan has gained 170 million views on YouTube.

== Live performances ==
=== Mersal Audio Launch ===
On 1 September 2017, filmmakers launched Mersal album on live program. A. R. Rahman performed the song live.

=== Concerts ===
- Netru Indru Naalai concert (12 January 2018), Chennai

Among all the songs played at Rahman's Netru Indru Naalai concert held in Chennai.

== Awards and nominations ==
| Award | Date of ceremony | Category | Recipient(s) and nominee(s) | Result | Ref |
|---|---|---|---|---|---|
| Edison Awards | 26 February 2018 | Best Male Playback Singer | Sathyaprakash for Aalaporaan Thamizhan | Won | |
| Filmfare Awards South | 16 June 2018 | Best Lyricist – Tamil | Vivek for Aalaporaan Thamizhan | Nominated | |
| South Indian International Movie Awards | 14 – 15 September 2018 | Best Lyricist | Vivek for Aalaporaan Thamizhan | Won | |
| Techofes Awards | 19 February 2018 | Best Male Playback Singer | Sathyaprakash for Aalaporaan Thamizhan | Won | |
| Techofes Awards | 19 February 2018 | Best Female Playback Singer | Pooja Vaidyanath for Aalaporaan Thamizhan | Won | |
| Vijay Awards | 3 June 2018 | Best Lyricist | Vivek for Aalaporaan Thamizhan | Nominated | |
| Vijay Awards | 3 June 2018 | Favourite Song | Aalaporaan Thamizhan | Won | |
