= Shivaji Surathkal =

2020 Kannada-language mystery thriller film

Shivaji Surathkal: The Case of Ranagiri Rahasya
- Directed by: Akash Srivatsa
- Written by: Akash Srivatsa; Abhijith YR
- Produced by: Anup Hanumanthe Gowda; Rekha KN
- Starring: Ramesh Aravind; Radhika Narayan
- Cinematography: Guruprasad M. G.
- Edited by: Srikanth; Akash Srivatsa
- Music by: Judah Sandhy
- Production company: Anjandri Cine Combines
- Distributed by: KRG Studios
- Release date: 21 February 2020
- Running time: 125 minutes
- Country: India
- Language: Kannada

Shivaji Surathkal: The Case of Ranagiri Rahasya is a 2020 Indian Kannada-language mystery thriller film written and directed by Akash Srivatsa, who also co-wrote the film with Abhijith YR, and produced by Anup Hanumanthe Gowda. It stars Ramesh Aravind (in his 101st film) and Radhika Narayan in lead roles.

Shivaji Surathkal: The Case of Ranagiri Rahasya was released on 21 February 2020 where it received positive reviews from critics. Inspired by Murder on the Orient Express, the film went on to become the highest-grossing Kannada film of 2020. The success of the film, led the makers to create a franchise and a sequel of the film titled Shivaji Surathkal 2 which released on 14 April 2023.

== Premise ==
Detective Shivaji Surathkal leaves to an eerie resort in Ranagiri to investigate the death of Roshan Ravi, the son of Home Minister Rajiv Ravi. While searching for clues, Shivaji must deal with his own trauma of losing his wife Janani and analyse the 11 suspects behind Roshan's death.

== Cast ==
- Ramesh Aravind as Detective Shivaji Surathkal
- Radhika Narayan as Janani
- Swaroopinii as Dr. Anjali
- Avinash Yelandur as Home Minister Rajiv Ravi
- Raaghu Raamanakoppa as Govindu
- Ramesh Pandit as SP Raheem
- Vinay Gowda as Roshan Ravi, Rajiv Ravi's son
- Rohith Bhanuprakash as Preetam Shetty
- Amita Ranganath as Soukya Ajjampura
- Namratha Surendranath as Smitha Shetty
- P. D. Sathish Chandra as Vidhyasagar
- Lakshmi Anand as Eureka Lobo
- K Pradeep as Valerian Lobo alias Bhata
- Kiran Kotta as Anwar
- Nishant Gudihalli as SI Rudresh
- Dhanush Raj as Bro
- Surya Vasishta as Somjith Gupta
- Mana Adhvik as SI Rakesh
- Sukanya Girish as Jessica Lobo
- Ram Manjjonaath as Ram, Rajeev Ravi PA
- Vidya Murthy as Janani's mother

== Soundtrack ==
Shivaji Surathkal - The Case of Ranagiri Rahasya

Soundtrack album by Judah Sandhy
- Released: 2020
- Recorded: 2019
- Studio: Anjandri Cine Combines
- Genre: Feature film soundtrack
- Length: 13:19
- Label: Divo
- Producer: Judah Sandhy

Judah Sandhy chronology
| ABCD: American Born Confused Desi (2019) | Shivaji Surathkal - The Case of Ranagiri Rahasya (2020) | Ira (2021) |

| No. | Title | Lyrics | Singer(s) | Length |
|---|---|---|---|---|
| 1. | "Usire" | Jayant Kaikini | Vijay Prakash | 3:38 |
| 2. | "Yaaro Nee Yaaro" | Akash Srivatsa | Sanjith Hegde, Judah Sandhy | 3:10 |
| 3. | "Aparichita" | Jayant Kaikini | Shreya Sundar Iyer | 3:00 |
| 4. | "Saavira" | Guru panchanbettu | Abhijith Y R | 3:30 |
| Total length: | | | | 13:19 |

== Reception ==
=== Critical response ===
Sunayana Suresh of The Times of India gave 3.5 out of 5 stars and wrote "Akash Srivatsa surely seems to have redeemed himself as a storyteller after his debut outing Badmaash. A sequel to a film like this that has the potential to become a franchise would be welcome, so watch this one and stay on track." A. Sharaadha of The New Indian Express gave 3.5 out of 5 stars and wrote "Ramesh Aravind sheds his regular image, and this transformation was possible only because of the director and writer’s imagination, and the actor’s versatility." Naveen Ms of FilmiBeat writing for its Kannada version gave it 3.5 out of 5 stars and wrote that the film has enough suspense, enough emotion ...while praising the acting of Ramesh Aravind and other members of the cast. He also praised the visuals and music of the movie. Baradwaj Rangan of Film Companion South wrote "Despite an interesting premise, the film is an underwhelming murder mystery".

=== Box office ===
The film was reported to have collected ₹2 crore in the first week of its run.

== Awards and nominations ==
| Award | Category | Recipient | Result | Ref. |
|---|---|---|---|---|
| 2nd Chandanavana Film Critics Academy Awards 2021 | Best Screenplay | Akash Srivatasa; Abhijith | Won | |
| 2nd Chandanavana Film Critics Academy Awards 2021 | Best Actor | Ramesh Aravind | Nominated | |
| 2nd Chandanavana Film Critics Academy Awards 2021 | Best Editing | Srikanth; Akash Srivatsa | Nominated | |
| 2nd Chandanavana Film Critics Academy Awards 2021 | Best VFx | | Nominated | |
| 10th South Indian International Movie Awards | Best Actress in a Supporting Role | Anvita Sagar | Nominated | |
| 10th South Indian International Movie Awards | Best Actor in a Negative Role | Ramesh Pandit | Nominated | |
| 10th South Indian International Movie Awards | Best Debut Producer | Anjandri Cine Combines | Won | |
| 10th South Indian International Movie Awards | Best Female Playback Singer | Shreya Sundar Iyer | Nominated | |
| 67th Filmfare Awards South | Best Film | Anup Gowda, Rekha KN | Nominated | |
| 67th Filmfare Awards South | Best Director | Akash Srivasta | Nominated | |
| 67th Filmfare Awards South | Best Actor | Ramesh Aravind | Nominated | |
| 67th Filmfare Awards South | Best Supporting Actress | Aarohi Narayan | Nominated | |

== Sequel ==
On September 10, 2021, Akash Srivatsa announce the film's sequel titled as Shivaji Surathkal 2 and also revealed that the titular character will be seen in three different shades.
