= Akash Srivatsa =

Indian director

- Occupations: Director, editor
- Years active: 2008-present

Akash Srivatsa is an Indian director who works in Kannada-language films. He is known for creating the character Shivaji Surathkal, which is inspired from Sherlock Holmes. He is a frequent collaborater with Ramesh Aravind. His last two films Shivaji Surathkal 1 & 2 have been hit films at the box office.

== Career ==
Akash Srivatsa worked as an assistant director for Accident (2008) and made his feature film debut with Badmaash (2016) starring Dhananjaya. In 2017, he began work on a crime thriller film featuring the character Shivaji Surathkal, the Indian version of Sherlock Holmes. The last name is based on the location of NITK. Regarding his work in Shivaji Surathkal (2020), a critic from The Times of India gave 3.5 out of 5 stars and wrote "Akash Srivatsa surely seems to have redeemed himself as a storyteller after his debut outing Badmaash. A sequel to a film like this that has the potential to become a franchise would be welcome, so watch this one and stay on track." The film was a success inspiring him to make a sequel Shivaji Surathkal 2 (2023). He debuted as an editor with 100 (2021).

== Filmography ==
As director

Year	Film	Notes
2013	Sulle Sathya	short film
2016	Badmaash	
2020	Shivaji Surathkal	
2023	Pentagon	Anthology film; segment Mysore Pak
2023	Shivaji Surathkal 2	
TBA	Daiji	

As editor

- 100 (2021)
