= Mappillai (1989 film) =

- Film poster
- Directed by: Rajasekhar
- Screenplay by: Panchu Arunachalam
- Based on: Attaku Yamudu Ammayiki Mogudu (Telugu)
- Produced by: Allu Aravind
- Starring: Rajinikanth; Amala; Srividya
- Cinematography: V Ranga
- Edited by: M. Vellaisamy
- Music by: Ilaiyaraaja
- Production company: Geetha Arts
- Release date: 28 October 1989
- Country: India
- Language: Tamil

Mappillai (transl. Son-in-law) is a 1989 Indian Tamil-language masala film directed by Rajasekhar, starring Rajinikanth, Srividya and Amala. It is a remake of the 1989 Telugu film Attaku Yamudu Ammayiki Mogudu, the Tamil version was produced by Geetha Arts, and Chiranjeevi who played the lead role in the original Telugu version made a special appearance in this film. The film was released on 28 October 1989, on the diwali eve and ran for 200+ days and became a blockbuster. The film was remade in Tamil with the same title in 2011.

== Plot ==
Arumugam makes a blazing entrance, gatecrashing a marriage to abduct the bride. Geetha, the bride's friend, gets him arrested but then learns that he had rescued the girl from a forced marriage. Further revelations about him that he is a gold medalist and has a good heart make her fall in love with him. After some convincing, Aarumugam reciprocates too. Meanwhile, Aarumugam's sister is in love with the son of a rich woman Rajarajeswari. When Rajarajeswari learns of this, she foists a false case on her and puts her in jail. It is then that Aarumugam has his first encounter with Rajarajeswari. He then learns that she is none other than Geetha's mother. He also invites Geetha's mother Rajarajeswari to his marriage. Since Aarumugam has married Geetha against her mother's wishes, Rajarajeswari vows to separate them. During the marriage, Aarumugam calls his friend Chiranjeevi that there are goons to stop the marriage where Chiranjeevi comes fights off the goons and attends the marriage and wishes them good luck and leaves. In contrast, Arumugam promises to prevent that and make Rajarajeswari understand that love and affection are more important than money.

== Cast ==
- Rajinikanth as Arumugam
- Srividya as Rajarajeswari
- Amala as Geetha
- Jaishankar as Ramanathan
- Nizhalgal Ravi as Ravi
- Vinu Chakravarthy as Pakkirisamy
- S. S. Chandran as Vinayagam
- Dubbing Janaki as Parvathi
- Dilip as Dileep
- Raja as Raja
- R. S. Shivaji as Dilli
- Lalitha Kumari as Aandal
- Chiranjeevi as Chiranjeevi, Arumugam's best friend (special appearance)
- Srihari as one of the henchmen (uncredited)
- Vengal Rao as one of the henchmen (uncredited)

== Production ==
Initially the role of the protagonist's mother-in-law was offered to Vyjayanthimala. But she refused the role after which it was given to Srividya.

== Soundtrack ==
The soundtrack was composed by Ilaiyaraaja. The song "Ennathan Sugamo" is set in the raga Gourimanohari, and "Maanin Iru Kangal" is set to Mayamalavagowla. "Ennoda Raasi" was recreated by Mani Sharma for Mappillai's 2011 remake.

Track listing
No.	Title	Lyrics	Singer(s)	Length
1.	"Ennathaan Sugamo"	Panchu Arunachalam	S. P. Balasubrahmanyam, S. Janaki	4:26
2.	"Ennoda Raasi"	Gangai Amaran	Malaysia Vasudevan	4:22
3.	"Maanin Iru Kangal"	Vaali	S. P. Balasubrahmanyam, S. Janaki	4:27
4.	"Unai Thaan Nitham"	Vaali	S. P. Balasubrahmanyam, S. Janaki	4:17
5.	"Veru Velai Unakku"	Piraisoodan	S. P. Balasubrahmanyam, S. Janaki	4:30
Total length:				22:02

== Reception ==
P. S. S. of Kalki wrote this Mappillai engages its viewers.

== Bibliography ==
- Sundararaman (2007) [2005]. Raga Chintamani: A Guide to Carnatic Ragas Through Tamil Film Music (2nd ed.). Pichhamal Chintamani. OCLC 295034757.
