= Drishya 2 =

Kannada language action thriller

- Theatrical release poster
- Directed by: P. Vasu
- Written by: P. Vasu
- Story by: Jeethu Joseph
- Based on: Drishyam 2 by Jeethu Joseph
- Produced by: Mukesh R. Mehta; C. V. Sarathi
- Starring: Ravichandran; Navya Nair; Swaroopinii; Unnathi; Asha Sharath; Pramod Shetty; Prabhu; Anant Nag
- Cinematography: Seetharam G. S. V.
- Edited by: Suresh Urs
- Music by: B. Ajaneesh Loknath
- Production company: E4 Entertainment
- Distributed by: Zee Studios
- Release date: 10 December 2021
- Running time: 146 minutes
- Country: India
- Language: Kannada

Drishya 2 is a 2021 Indian Kannada-language crime drama film directed by P. Vasu and produced by E4 Entertainment. The film stars Ravichandran, Navya Nair, Swaroopinii, Unnathi, Asha Sharath, Pramod Shetty, Prabhu, and Anant Nag. It is a remake of the 2021 Malayalam film Drishyam 2 (2021) and a sequel to Drishya (2014).

The film was released on 10 December 2021, and received positive reviews from critics.

== Plot ==
On the night of 3 March 2014, a convict named Annappa is on the run from the authorities for murdering his brother-in-law. Hiding behind an unfinished police station, he sees Rajendra emerging from it. Afterwards, he attempts to apologize to his wife, but end up being arrested by the police.

Seven years later, Rajendra, Seetha, Sindhu and Shreya are leading a more prosperous life. Rajendra is now a successful businessman, and owner of a movie theatre who yearns to produce a film of his own, despite his family's strong reservations. He is in constant contact with a renowned screenwriter named Vijayshankar, to develop the plot.

However, Sindhu has recurring episodes of epilepsy and has PTSD – a direct consequence of her fears of being arrested, on account of her complicity in the murder of Tarun Chandrasekhar. Jealous of the family's rise in wealth, a number of villagers have resorted to spreading rumours about Sindhu having "venereal connections" with Tarun – much to Seetha's distress.

Seetha's only source of solace is her friendly neighbor Savitha – a government clerk, who is often abused by her alcoholic husband, Joseph – a real estate broker. The Karnataka Police has been humiliated in their inability to decipher the truth behind Tarun's case. Meanwhile, Rajendra has an encounter with Tarun's father Mr. Chandrasekhar, who vainly begs the former to disclose the location of his son's remains.

Meanwhile, Shreya comes home for spring break and invites her friends for a house party, despite Seetha's objections. With Rajendra remaining aloof to her concerns, Seetha spends more time with Savitha, and on one occasion, inadvertently blurts on the truth about her family's complicity in Tarun's death. Unbeknownst to her, Savitha and Joseph are actually married undercover cops, assigned by IG Prathap Narayan, who is a close friend and colleague of Roopa.

Annappa is released from prison. After struggling to make amends with his now-estranged family, he seeks to find employment. While coming to know that Rajendra's case is still ongoing, he recollects Rajendra's presence at the police station which was under construction. Realizing that Rajendra was indeed complicit in the murder, he tips Prathap – who later summons Roopa and Chandrasekhar from the U.S.A.

After the trio bribes him with a sum of ₹5 lakh (US$5,200), Annappa reveals Rajendra's presence at the then-unfinished police station on the night of 3 August. Armed with Annappa's revelations, the authorities raid the police station, eventually unearthing a human skeleton. Concurrently, Rajendra, having noticed the events through his CCTV cameras (which he had set up around the police station), seemingly gives up.

Armed with the discovery of the human remains, Prathap, Roopa, and Chandrasekhar summons Rajendra's family for an informal investigation. Rajendra, Seetha, Shreya and Sindhu manage to maintain their alibi. However, Roopa reveals a voice recording of Seetha's earlier confession to Savitha; the police had bugged the family residence earlier. Having exposed the family, Roopa turns to question Sindhu, resulting in the latter having another epileptic seizure.

Distraught, Rajendra falsely confesses to Prathap that he was the culprit in Tarun's murder. With the police satisfied, the family is released and Rajendra ends up being arrested, but Roopa isn't satisfied as she demands that Rajendra's family be punished as well. Later, Rajendra is placed on trial for Tarun's murder. Concurrently, Vijayshankar, having learned about Rajendra's arrest, pays a visit to Prathap, Roopa and Chandrasekhar.

He reveals that during his business collusions with Rajendra, the latter had fabricated a script for a future crime thriller, loosely based on Tarun's murder. He further reveals that Rajendra had published a novel, titled Drishya, based on the film script (although it was published under Vijayshankar's name, for copyright protection). The quartet is then informed that Rajendra had officially pleaded not guilty, with his legal defence submitting that he had been framed by the authorities, which had "misused" Drishya's plot as a means to incriminate him.

Realizing that Rajendra's earlier confession matches with Drishya's plot, Prathap deduces that Rajendra had created the novel and the confession, as a part of a scheme to escape legal punishment. Even more surprising, the DNA tests conducted on the skeleton revealed that it doesn't match Tarun's DNA. Stunned, Vijayashankar divulges that Rajendra had fabricated an alternate climax for his film – in which the hero (Rajendra), in his bid to evade legal punishment, would procure the remains of another person of same age and sex, who had died owing to similar injuries like that of the villain by befriending the gravedigger of the cemetery where that said body had been interred.

The hero would keep the skeletal remains which he got from the cemetery with him for nearly three years, and befriend a security guard at the district medical college morgue under the pretext of offering him a chance in the film industry. On the night the remains excavated from the police station arrive at the morgue, after plying the security guard with drinks, the hero would switch the body in the morgue, just before the day the DNA analysis is to be performed.

With no physical evidence to prove his culpability, Rajendra is released on personal bail. Rajendra's lawyer Renuka requests the Judge to kindly direct the state police not to proceed against Rajendra and his family for the time being as they are approaching the High Court of Karnataka to stop all the proceedings against them in connection with the "so-called" crime. The Judge calls Prathap to his chambers and tells him that both Rajendra's and Chandrasekhar's families truly deserve justice, but the legal system is unable to provide it to them.

The judge also orders Prathap to end all investigations of Tarun's case, as unsolved cases are not new to the system. Outside the courthouse, Vijayashankar discloses to Roopa and Chandrasekhar that Rajendra's alternate climax had a tail end as well: the hero would transfer the villain's remains to his bereaved parents. Simultaneously, Rajendra has Tarun's cremated skeletal remains anonymously handed over to Roopa and Chandrasekhar.

As Chandrasekhar immerses Tarun's ashes into the river, Prathap convinces Roopa to let go of her enmity with Rajendra, saying that they will never succeed in punishing Rajendra since he is making good on his intent to protect his family. Prathap also states that Rajendra's life is his punishment, as the latter must constantly endeavour in his efforts to protect his family from the ever-watchful eye of the authorities. Meanwhile, Rajendra, who was watching the trio from afar, leaves solemnly.

== Cast ==
- Ravichandran as Rajendra Ponnappa
- Navya Nair as Seetha
- Swaroopinii as Sindhu
- Unnathi as Shreya
- Asha Sharath as Roopa Chandrashekhar
- Prabhu as Chandrashekhar
- Pramod Shetty as IG Prathap Narayan IPS
- Anant Nag as Vijay Shankar
- Sadhu Kokila as Tea shop customer
- Krishna Hebbale as Inspector Bharat
- Lasya Nagraj as Savitha
- Narayana Swamy as Joseph
- Sampath Kumar as Annappa
- Sonu Gowda as Advocate Renuka
- Srinivas Prabhu as DGP
- Suresh Lakkoor as Judge
- Shivaram as Tea shop owner

== Production ==
The film was announced in April 2021. Filming took place in Kadagadalu and Balamuri. Drishya 2 was slightly modified from the serious tone in the first half of the original film.

== Music ==
The film's music was composed by B. Ajaneesh Loknath.

Track listing
No.	Title	Lyrics	Singer(s)	Length
1.	"Malebille"	Anup Bhandari	Haricharan	4:25
Total length:				4:25

== Reception ==
The film received positive reviews from critics.

Sunayana Suresh of The Times of India gave 3.5/5 stars and wrote, "Drishya 2 is a good attempt and technically sound, thanks to the top-notch technical crew". The New Indian Express gave 3/5 stars and wrote, "Drishya 2 is a faithful remake, making it for a good family outing." ZEE5 called it a realistic recreation that will keep you fascinated.
