= Abhishek Iyengar =

Indian playwright and theatre director

- Born: 8 November 1984 (age 41); Bengaluru
- Occupations: Theatre director, writer
- Years active: 2006–present

Abhishek Iyengar is an Indian playwright and theatre director. He is a co-founder of Bangalore-based theatre company WeMove Theatre. He writes play in Kannada and English.

== Career ==
Iyengar wrote E=MC^{2}, a thriller play which revolves around the life of a software engineer. The protagonist of the play, a person with schizophrenia, is hired to search the missing Software Engineer and through this quest he explores many other hidden truths. His another play entitled Magadi Days is a political satire. In this play, a local government manipulates the laws because of which the common man suffers. His play Namma Metro (2012) is a symbolic representation of Bangalore. It deals with issues of how a small-time city suddenly gets exposed to globalization and the repercussions occurs due to the same. In 2013, he wrote and directed P.S. I Don't Love You. His play Cocktail is a collection of eight short stories based on the real-life stories of people in India. Each story depicts a different emotion and expression thus adding eight different variations. The play is devised using the 'black-box' concept. His play Anaavarana (The Unveiling) revolves around the subject of reunion of friends after their graduation. Miffed with their own secrets, the six friends try to recollect their graduation days and what percolates out is a series of emotions which were always hidden from each other.

In 2006, he co-founded the WeMove Theatre with Rangraj Bhattacharya. In 2017, he was appointed a WorldTheatre Ambassador as a representative of India for world theatre map, as a part of HowlRound, a project by Emerson College, Boston.

== Awards ==
Iyengar received first prize at Adjust Madkobedi Theatre Festival for his play Mooru Humpugalu. Iyengar was awarded the Kannada Sahitya Parishat Award by Kannada Sahitya Parishat for his plays Magadi Days and By2coffee.

== List of plays ==
=== Plays written in English ===
- P.S I Don't Love You
- Cocktail
- Malgudi Express (adapted from Malgudi Days written by R. K. Narayan)
- Anaavarana (The Unveiling) (2017), directed by Ranjan S.

=== Plays written in Kannada ===
- Namma Metro
- Magadi Days
- E=MC^{2}
- Sambhandagala Sutta
