= Swaroopinii =

Indian actress

- Other name: Aarohi Narayan
- Occupation: Actress
- Years active: 2014–present

Swaroopinii (formerly Aarohi Narayan) is an Indian actress who works in Kannada films. She is known for her roles in the Drishya film series (2014–2021), Shivaji Surathkal (2020) and Bheemasena Nalamaharaja (2020).

== Early life and career ==
Aged four, Aarohi watched Prabhu Deva's dance moves. She also saw Black (2005) and Dr. Rajkumar's films, all of which inspired her to become an actress. After playing Ravichandran's daughter in Drishya (2014), she played a psychiatrist in Shivaji Surathkal (2020) and a rebellious Iyengar woman in Bheemasena Nalamaharaja (2020). Aarohi reprised her role in Drishya in its sequel, Drishya 2 (2021).

== Filmography ==
Year	Title	Role	Notes	Ref.
2014	Drishya	Sindhu		
2020	Shivaji Surathkal	Dr. Anjali		
2020	Bheemasena Nalamaharaja	Dr. Arohi / Vedavalli Varadarajan		
2021	Drishya 2	Sindhu		
2024	Moorane Krishnappa		Cameo appearance	
2025	Love OTP	Sana	Kannada-Telugu bilingual film	
2027	Lord Gaaga	TBA	Multilingual film	

== Discography ==
Year	Title	Song	Ref.
2018	Buckasura	"Hare Ram"	

== Awards and nominations ==
Year	Award	Category	Work	Result	Ref
2022	67th Filmfare Awards South	Best Supporting Actress	Shivaji Surathkal	Nominated	
2022	67th Filmfare Awards South	Best Actress	Bheemasena Nalamaharaja	Nominated	
2022	10th South Indian International Movie Awards	Best Actress in a Supporting Role	Drishya 2	Won	
