= Senior theatre =

Senior theatre is a form of drama designed specifically for older adults, where seniors are actively involved.

In 1999, there were 79 companies in the US. As of 2016, there are over 800 groups with many around the world.

Many theatre performers want to be on stage when they are older. A good number have never acted before, others have performed when they were young and want to do it again. Some have acted all their lives and they know the joy of performing. Seniors have time to explore the theatre.

== Benefits ==
The performers range from professional to amateur in both rural and urban settings. Ages usually span between 50 and 90 years but most are in their late 1960s and 1970s. There are many benefits derived from Senior Theatre including physical, mental, psychological, social, and cultural growth. It builds vital social connections for often isolated seniors.
