= Magizh Thirumeni =

Indian film director and screenwriter (born 1978)

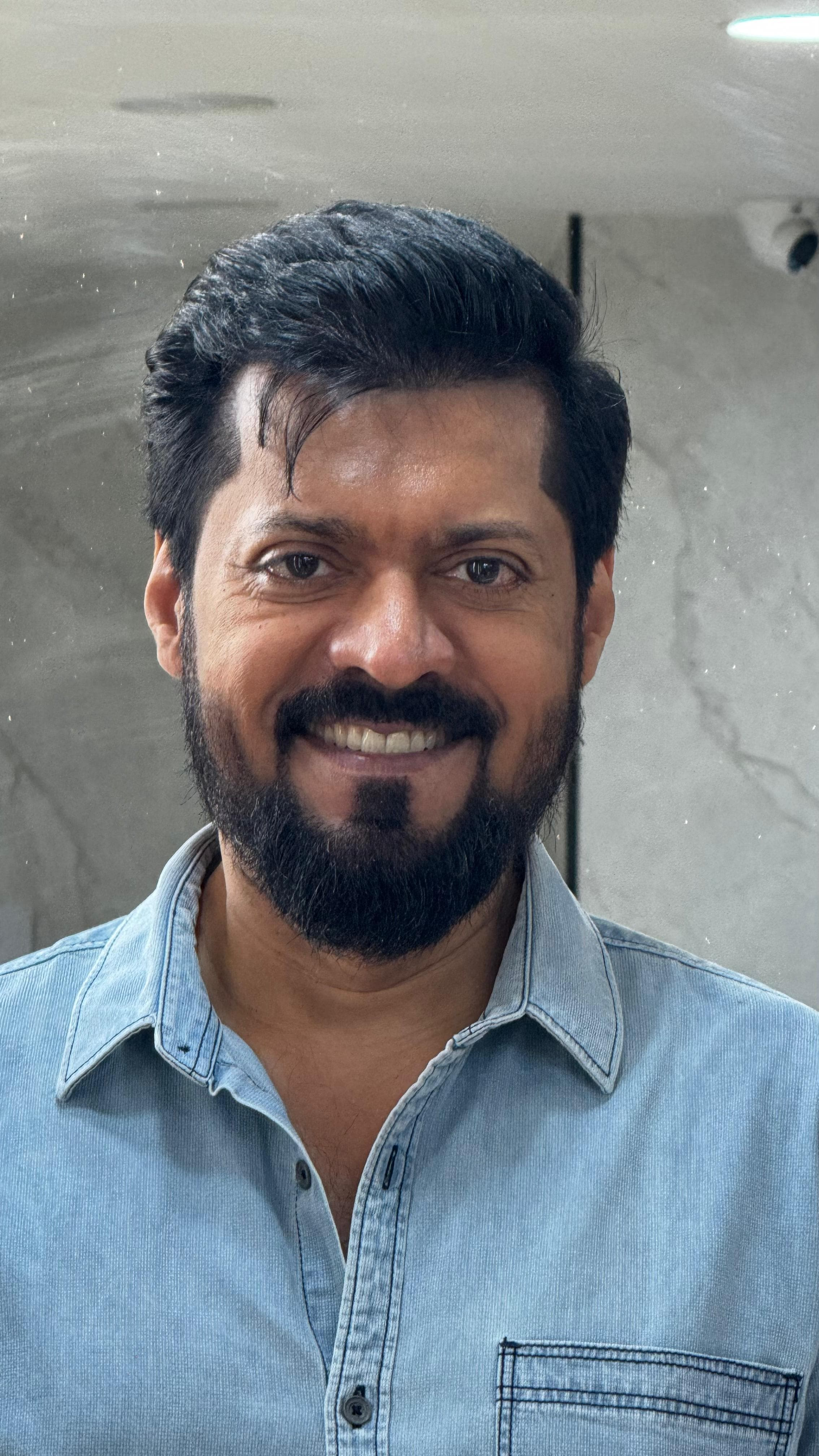
- Thirumeni in 2025
- Born: Morgan Anthony; 9 October 1978 (age 48); Madras, Tamil Nadu, India
- Occupations: Film director, Dubbing Artist, Screenwriter
- Years active: 2003-Present
- Spouse: Ann Rosneha (m. 2021)
- Children: 1

Morgan Antony also known by his stage name Magizh Thirumeni (born 9 October 1978), is an Indian film director, screenwriter, dubbing artist and actor who works primarily in Tamil cinema. After working as an assistant to directors Selvaraghavan and Gautham Vasudev Menon, he directed six films, including one romantic film and five action thrillers Mundhinam Paartheney (2010), Thadaiyara Thaakka (2012), Meaghamann (2013), Thadam (2019), Kalaga Thalaivan (2022) and Vidaamuyarchi (2025).

== Career ==
=== Early career ===
As a teenager, Magizh Thirumeni was an avid reader of Tamil and Russian literature, and often wrote poetry and short stories revealing he found the experience "fulfilling". He thus moved on to attempting novels and writing scripts, before being smitten by film-making. In the early 2000s, hoping to make a breakthrough in the film industry as a director, Magizh often visited the offices of directors, including P. Vasu and T. Rajender, hoping to join their teams. Director Kasthuri Raja signed on Magizh to work on his son Selvaraghavan's first film, but delays meant he first worked as an assistant director in the team of their coming-of-age film Thulluvadho Ilamai (2002). Magizh then met his mentor Gautham Vasudev Menon at editor Suresh Urs's office while working on the post-production of another film and offered to work with Menon, being signed up to join him during the production of Kaakha Kaakha (2003). He worked extensively on the film as well as on Vettaiyaadu Vilaiyaadu (2006), before leaving Menon's team ten days into the shoot of Pachaikili Muthucharam (2007).

=== As a director ===
Magizh made his directorial debut with the 2010 romantic comedy film, Mundhinam Paartheney, featuring a cast of newcomers. His second film, the action thriller, Thadaiyara Thaakka (2012), featuring Arun Vijay and Mamta Mohandas in the lead roles, released in June 2012. It eventually went on to become a sleeper hit. Despite the positive reviews from critics and making profits, Magizh revealed that the film would have done better with a wider release and more publicity. He stated that the "Adults only" censor certificate meant that the film could not stay in the cinema halls for a long period of time. However, it went on to gain a cult following after it was uploaded on YouTube. Magizh then made another action thriller, Meaghamann (2014), with Arya and Hansika Motwani in the lead roles, which released to positive reviews. His next film, Thadam, was his second collaboration with Arun Vijay. It was released in March 2019, to highly positive reviews from both the critics and audience, alike. It went on to become his first blockbuster, and is considered to be one among Arun Vijay's best films. Thadam was remade in Telugu as Red (2021) starring Ram Pothineni and in Hindi as Gumraah (2023) starring Aditya Roy Kapur. He collaborated with Udhayanidhi Stalin, Nidhi Agerwal, and Arav for his next film, Kalaga Thalaivan. Upon release, in 2022, it received positive reviews from the critics. His latest film, Vidaamuyarchi starring Ajith Kumar, was released in 2025.

== Filmography ==
Key
†	Denotes films that have not yet been released

=== As director ===
Year	Film	Notes
2010	Mundhinam Paartheney	
2012	Thadaiyara Thaakka	
2014	Meaghamann	
2019	Thadam	also writer
2022	Kalaga Thalaivan	
2025	Vidaamuyarchi	

=== As dubbing artist ===
Year	Film	Actor	Role
2003	Kaakha Kaakha	Bijoy Menon	Commissioner
2018	Imaikkaa Nodigal	Anurag Kashyap	Martin Roy (Rudhra)

=== As Actor ===
Year	Film	Role
2023	Yaadhum Oore Yaavarum Kelir	Rajan
2021	Teddy	Dr. Varathrajan
