= Aaram Arivu =

Indian Tamil-language TV series

- Also known as: ஆறாம் அறிவு
- Genre: Soap opera
- Written by: T.T. Dhavamani
- Directed by: T.T. Dhavamani; T. Sathiamoorthi; Bharani Gopinath; Vadi Pvss
- Starring: Rajesh Kannan; Shafinah Banu; Karthik Moorthy; Janani Devi; Dhurrgah Mathivanan
- Country of origin: Singapore
- Original language: Tamil
- No. of seasons: 1
- No. of episodes: 32

Production
- Producers: Parthiban; S. Manickam
- Production location: Singapore
- Editor: Naveen Selvanayagam
- Camera setup: Multi-camera
- Running time: approx. 20-22 minutes per episode

Original release
- Network: MediaCorp Vasantham
- Release: 27 June – 28 August 2016

Aaram Arivu (transl. Sixth sense) is a Tamil-language soap opera that aired on MediaCorp Vasantham from 27 June 2016 to 28 August 2016 at 10:30PM SST for 32 episodes. The show starred Rajesh Kannan, Shafinah Banu, Karthik Moorthy, Janani Devi, Dhurrgah Mathivanan and among others.

== Cast ==
- Rajesh Kannan
- Shafinah Banu
- Karthik Moorthy
- Janani Devi
- Dhurrgah Mathivanan
- Poobalan Arasu
- Dr. Kader Ibrahim
- Vicknesvari Vadivalagan

== Broadcast ==
Series was released on 27 June 2016 on Mediacorp Vasantham. It aired in Malaysia on Mediacorp Vasantham, Its full length episodes and released its episodes on their app Toggle, a live TV feature was introduced on Toggle with English Subtitle.

== Nominations ==
Pradhana Vizha 2018

- Best Actor in a Lead Role - Rajesh Kannan
- Best Actress in a Supporting Role - Shafinah Banu
