= Pooja Vaidyanath =

Indian Tamil playback singer (born 1988)

- Also known as: A. V. Pooja
- Born: 15 February 1988 (age 38); Chennai, India
- Genre: Playback singing
- Occupation: Singer
- Years active: 2013–present

Pooja Vaidyanath is an Indian playback singer who has worked in the Indian film industry. After appearing on several reality singing shows on Tamil and Telugu television, Pooja has worked on Tamil, Telugu and Hindi language films for musicians including A. R. Rahman, D. Imman and S. Thaman.

== Career ==
Pooja was born to doctor Vaidyanath and Gita, a bank employee in Chennai. After becoming interested in Carnatic and Hindustani music as a child, Pooja regularly took part in singing talent shows and first partook and won in the Telugu show Padalani Undi hosted by S. P. Balasubrahmanyam on Maa TV in 2006. She later competed in the Zee Telugu Sa Re Ga Ma Pa Voice of Youth in which she was crowned runner-up in 2008, before also winning the Vaanampadi competition broadcast in 2010 on Tamil language channel Kalaignar TV. In 2011, she finished as a runner up in Airtel Super Singer 3 and the opportunity brought her offers from the film industry. Pooja worked with A. R. Rahman in his Hindi film Raanjhanaa and recorded for the song "Tum Tak", which a critic from Filmfare described as a "winner". Rahman subsequently recorded the song again with her in Tamil as well as the tune "Unnaal Unnaal" for the film's Tamil version, Ambikapathy.

Pooja has subsequently continued to sing popular songs in Tamil films including "Parkadhey" from Varuthapadatha Valibar Sangam (2013), "Yeppo Maama Treatu" from Jilla (2014) and "Aalaporan Tamizhan" from A. R. Rahman's Mersal (2017).

== Television ==
Year	Name of Television Show	Role	Network
2024	Super Singer Season 10	Co-singer with contestant	Star Vijay

== Notable discography ==
Year	Song title	Film	Language	Music director	Notes
2013	"Thalaivaa"	Thalaivaa	Tamil	G. V. Prakash Kumar	
2013	"Tum Tak"	Raanjhanaa	Hindi	A. R. Rahman	
2013	"Kaanavae" "Unnaal"	Ambikapathy (Dubbed version)	Tamil	A. R. Rahman	
2013	"Annamae" "Naringa Uranga"	Annakodi	Tamil	G. V. Prakash Kumar	
2013	"Parkathey Parkathey"	Varuthapadatha Valibar Sangam	Tamil	D. Imman	Vijay Television Awards for Favourite Singer Female
2014	"Yeppo Maama Treatu"	Jilla	Tamil	D. Imman	
2014	"Mosale Mosale"	Yennamo Yedho	Tamil	D. Imman	
2014	"Nenjankuzhi"	Naveena Saraswathi Sabatham	Tamil	Prem Kumar	
2014	"Manamae Manamae"	Vanmam	Tamil	S. Thaman	
2014	"Pesadhe"	Thirudan Police	Tamil	Yuvan Shankar Raja	
2014	"Yaen Ingu Vandhaan"	Meaghamann	Tamil	S. Thaman	
2015	"Jingilia Jingilia"	Puli	Tamil	Devi Sri Prasad	
2016	"Hello Mister"	Kotikokkadu	Telugu	D. Imman	
2016	"Elanthaari" "Kannadikkala"	Maaveeran Kittu	Tamil	D. Imman	
2017	"Aalaporaan Thamizhan"	Mersal	Tamil	A. R. Rahman	
2019	"Vera Level U"	Ayogya	Tamil	S. Thaman	
2022	"Malle Poovu"	The Life of Muthu (Vendhu Thanindhadhu Kaadu)	Telugu	A. R. Rahman	
2026	"Janumada jodi"	Ramayana : Part 1	Kannada	A.R. Rahman	
