= List of Kannada films of 2021 =

A list of Kannada language films produced in the Kannada cinema in India in the year 2021.

== Box office collection ==
Highest worldwide gross of 2021
Rank	Title	Gross	Production company	Ref.
1	Roberrt	₹78 crore (equivalent to ₹88 crore or US$9.1 million in 2023)	Umapathy Films	
2	Kotigobba 3	₹45.32 crore (equivalent to ₹51 crore or US$5.3 million in 2023)	Rambabu Productions	
3	Pogaru	₹45 crore (equivalent to ₹50 crore or US$5.2 million in 2023)	Sri Jagadguru Movies	
4	Yuvarathnaa	₹32.41 crore (equivalent to ₹36 crore or US$3.8 million in 2023)	Hombale Films	
5	Madhagaja	₹25.7 crore (equivalent to ₹29 crore or US$3.0 million in 2023)	Umapathy Films	
6	Salaga	₹25 crore (equivalent to ₹28 crore or US$2.9 million in 2023)	Venus Enterrtainer	
7	Badava Rascal	₹16 crore (equivalent to ₹18 crore or US$1.9 million in 2023)	Daali Pictures	

== January – March ==
Opening		Title	Director	Cast	Studio	Ref
J A N U A R Y	1	Rajatantra	PVR Swamy	Raghavendra Rajkumar, Bhavya, Doddanna, Srinivasa Murthy, Shankar Ashwath, Ranjan Hassan	Produced by Wishvam Digital Media	
J A N U A R Y	8	Amruthavahini	K. Narendra Babu	H. S. Venkateshamurthy, Vaidya Shimogga, Jagadish, Tyagaraju	Produced by Sampath Kumar and Akshay Rao	
J A N U A R Y	8	Mahishasura	Uday Prasanna	Raj Manju, Arjun Rao, Bindhu Shree, Thushhar. M	Produced by Melekote Touring Talkies	
J A N U A R Y	15	Vikky	S. Ramesh	Aryan Gowda, Ridhi Rao	Produced by Sri Banashankari Movie Creations	
J A N U A R Y	22	Kathle Kaadu	Raju Devasandra	Sanjeev, Shivajinagara Lal, Kiran, Samhitha Shah, Sindhu Rao, Sinchana	Produced by Sagar King Production	
J A N U A R Y	22	Laddu	R. Ramanand	Sameer Nagarad, Bindhushree, Harshith, Rockline Sudhakar, Pavithra	Produced by Sri Madhamma Creations	
J A N U A R Y	22	Pantru	Milaan Dhanu	Prashanth Siddhi, Shivamogga Santhosh, Sunil Kumar, Meghashree, Rockline Sudhakar	Produced by SNLNS Entertainers	
J A N U A R Y	22	Talaq Talaq Talaq	Milaan Dhanu	Suchethan Vaidyanath, RJ Nethra, Shamanth Vaidya, Ravi Bhat, Srinivasa Murthy	Produced by Suchethana Enterprises	
J A N U A R Y	29	Naanu Nan Jaanu	Shri Hari	Manu Basavaraj, Ruthvika Shetty, Srujan Lokesh, 'Majabharatha' JK	Produced by Charlie Studio's	
J A N U A R Y	29	Ramarjuna	Anish Tejeshwar	Anish Tejeshwar, Nishvika Naidu, Rangayana Raghu, Bala Rajwadi, Ravi Kale, Sharath Lohitashwa	Produced by Winkwhistle Productions	
F E B R U A R Y	5	Gattu	Firoz H. Khan	Govind Rathod, Sahana, Ayub Khan	Produced by N. N. R. Productions	
F E B R U A R Y	5	Inspector Vikram	Sri Narasimha	Prajwal Devaraj, Bhavana Menon, Raghu Mukherjee, Harish Raj, Rangayana Raghu, Darshan	Produced by Vikhyath Chithra Production	
F E B R U A R Y	5	Mangalavara Rajaadina	Yuvin	Chandan Achar, Lasya Nagaraj, Gopalkrishna Deshpande, Harini Shreekanth, M. S. Jahangir	Produced by Trivarga Films	
F E B R U A R Y	5	Manjra	Mutthuraj Reddy	Ranjeet Singh, Nithya Raj, Ranjan Pangutti, Jai Krishna Sarja	Produced by Sri Durgaparameshwari Cine Productions	
F E B R U A R Y	5	Shadow	Ravi Gowda	Vinod Prabhakar, Shobhita Rana, Sharath Lohitashwa, Satya Dev, Giresham	Remake of Napoleon; Produced by Sri Kanakadurga Chalana Chitra	
F E B R U A R Y	12	Annthamma	K. Anbu Aras	Rakesh, Varsha Rajpurohit	Produced by Golden Dream Productions	
F E B R U A R Y	12	Kalavida	Shivananda H. D.	Pradeep Kumaar, Sambrama Gowda, Manjunath Hegde, Lokesh Gowda, Geetha Bhat	Produced by Padmaraj Films	
F E B R U A R Y	12	Kanasu Maratakkide	Smitesh S. Barya	Prajnesh Shetty, Swasthika Poojary, Navya Poojary, K. S. Shridhar	Produced by Shree Pashana Murthy Cine Creations	
F E B R U A R Y	12	Nimmuru	Vijay S.	Lucky Raam, Veena Gangaram	Produced by Hatavadi Films	
F E B R U A R Y	12	Preethi Endarenu	Manju Sagar	Manju Sagar, Ramnitu Chaudhary, Sharath Lohitashwa, Dharma	Produced by Manju Movies	
F E B R U A R Y	12	Ra?	Rajesh Gowda	Rajesh Gowda, Saana Naik, Sujith Nayak	Produced by Ra Film Factory	
F E B R U A R Y	19	Pogaru	Nanda Kishore	Dhruva Sarja, Rashmika Mandanna, Dhananjay, Raghavendra Rajkumar, Mayuri Kyatari, Chikkanna	Produced by Sri Jagadguru Movies	
F E B R U A R Y	26	Ambani Putra	Dore Raj Teja	Supreem, Asha Bandary, Kavya, Preetham, Manje Gowda	Produced by VS-PS Movies	
F E B R U A R Y	26	Cyanide Mallika	Guru	Guru, Sanjana Prakash, Manjula, Sowmya, Swathi	Produced by Entertainment Guru Productions	
F E B R U A R Y	26	Kartha	Durga Prasad	Venky, Deepthi Manne, Sarah Annaiah, Elena, Rajashekar Naidu	Produced by Sri Sapthagiri Entertainments	
F E B R U A R Y	26	Kushka	Vikram Yoganand	Guruprasad, Chandu Gowda, Kailash Pai, Sanjana Anand, Madhuri B	Produced by Ira Films. Re-Releasing after pandemic	
F E B R U A R Y	26	Preman	Shivaraj Madhugiri	Vishnu Teja, Partha, Sunetra Pandit, Dhanika, Divyananda, Ramesh Pandit, Nagendra Shah	Produced by Sri Bhairaveshwara Combines	
F E B R U A R Y	26	Salt	Bharath Nanda	Chandu Chatrapathi, Sateesh Malavalli, Bharath Nanda, Chethan Kumar, Vijayshree Kalburgi, Yashaswini Shetty	Produced by Rajarathna Studio	
F E B R U A R Y	26	Scary Forest	Sanjay Abhir	Jayaprabhu Lingayath, Teena Ponnappa, Jeet Raidutt, Kalpana Saini, Yashpal Sharma	Produced by JP Entertainment World	
M A R C H	5	Dheeram	URS Manjunath	Ajith Mani, Ramika	Produced by Shree Gurumurthy Creations	
M A R C H	5	Hero	Bharath Murthy	Rishab Shetty, Pramod Shetty, Ganavi Laxman, Ugramm Manju	Produced by Rishab Shetty Films	
M A R C H	5	MBA	HP	Puneeth Gowda, Kavya Gowda, Soumya Shanbogh, Gooli Soma	Produced by Public Pictures	
M A R C H	5	Rakhta Gulabi	RaBi	Vikramadithya, Shivani, Bharath Raj, Maanikya G. N., Vinod Kumar	Produced by Machinekad Films	
M A R C H	11	Roberrt	Tharun Sudhir	Darshan, Jagapathi Babu, Ravi Kishan, Asha Bhat, Devaraj, P. Ravi Shankar	Produced by Umapathy Films	
M A R C H	19	Munduvareda Adhyaya	Balu Chandrashekar	Adithya, Ashika Somashekar, Bhaskar Shetty, Jai Jagadish, Mukhyamantri Chandru	Produced by Kanaja Enterprises	
M A R C H	19	Ondu Ghanteya Kathe	Dwarki Raghava	Ajay Raj, Shanaya Katwe, Swathi Sharma, Prakash Thuminad, Nagendra Shah, Prashanth Siddhi	Produced by Realwealth Venture Productions	
M A R C H	26	Anagha	Raju N. R.	Karan Aryan, Kiran Raj, Rohit R. Rangaswamy, Kushi Shetty, Nalin, Deepa Mohan, Srinivas Goudru	Produced by Deeksha Samuha Cinema	
M A R C H	26	Nanna Guri Warrant - The Mission	Nagendra Urs	Karthik Jayaram, Thandav Ram, Manisha Waigankar	Produced by Aangels Production	
M A R C H	26	Paaru	Hanamanthu Poojar	Baby Hithaishi Poojar, Master Mailari Poojar, Master Atchuth, Master Prasad	Produced by Durga Cine Creations	
M A R C H	26	Ranam	V. Samudra	Chiranjeevi Sarja, Chethan Kumar, Varalaxmi Sarathkumar, Deepti Sati, Rahul Dev, Sadhu Kokila	Produced by R. S. Productions	

== April – June ==
Opening		Title	Director	Cast	Studio	Ref
A P R I L	1	Yuvarathnaa	Santhosh Ananddram	Puneeth Rajkumar, Sayyeshaa Saigal, Dhananjay, Prakash Raj	Hombale Films	
A P R I L	9	Kode Muruga	Subramanya Prasad	Muni Krishna, Subramanya Prasad, Pallavi Gowda, Yogesh, Dattanna, Kuri Prathap	KRK Productions	
A P R I L	9	Brungada Benneri	Manju Pandavapura	Chetan Chaman, Narayana Swamy, M D Kowshik, Rekha Sagar, Bhagyashri	Checha Creations	
A P R I L	16	Krishna Talkies	Vijay Anand	Ajay Rao, Apoorva, Sindhu Lokanath, Chikkanna, Pramod Shetty	Gokula Entertainers	
A P R I L	16	Rewind	Thej	Thej, Chandana Raghavendra, Dharma, Sundar Raj	Panoramic Studio	

== July – September ==
Opening		Title	Director	Cast	Note	Ref
J U L Y	9	Omelette	Venkat Bharadwaj	Shinav, Samyukta Hornad, Niranjan Deshpande, Shobhraj		
J U L Y	12	SHE	Lohit Ravi	Barath Gowda, Rishika Naik	Released on MX Player	
J U L Y	20	Ikkat	Esham Khan; Haseen Khan	Nagabhushana N S, Bhoomi Shetty	Released on Amazon Prime Video	
A U G U S T	6	Kaliveera	Avinash Bhusan	Ekalavyaa, Umesh Punga, Rockline Sudhakar, Renu Sri Gowda	First Kannada movie to be released in Theatres after COVID-19 pandemic.	
A U G U S T	16	Seetharam Benoy Case No. 18	Devi Prasad Shetty	Vijay Raghavendra, Sreeharsha Gobhatt, Devi Prakash, Satwik Hebbar, Nagaraj Shimoga	First Kannada film to premiere in television before theatrical release	
A U G U S T	19	Jeevnane Natka Samy	Raju Bhandari Rajavartha	Kiran Raj, Shree Harsha, Pavithra Kotian, Anika Ramya	Produced by Arya Entertainment	
A U G U S T	20	Groufie	Ravi Arjun D.	Aryan S. G., Padmashree C. Jain, Gagan Gowda, Uma Mayuri, Prajwal Ranesinghe, Sandhya Gowda	Produced by Lia Global Media	
A U G U S T	20	Shardula	Aravind Kaushik	Chethan Chandra, Raviteja, Kruttika Ravindra, Aishwarya Prasad	Produced by Bhairava Cinemas and CVR Cinemas	
S E P T E M B E R	10	Lanke	Ram Prasad	Yogesh, Kavya Shetty, Sanchari Vijay, Gayatri Jayaraman, Ester Noronha, Krishi Thapanda	Produced by The Great Entertainment	
S E P T E M B E R	10	Osho	Ziaullah Khan	Anand Itagi, Deepa Shree Gowda	Produced by A. R. Motion Pictures.	
S E P T E M B E R	10	Ascharya	D. K. Shindhe	Prabhuraj, Sunitha Gowda, Ramesh Pandit	Produced by Sri Chamundeshwari Productions	
S E P T E M B E R	17	Chaddi Dost Kaddi Alladusbutta	Oscar Krishna	Oscar Krishna, Gouri Nair, Sevenraj, Lokendra Surya	Produced by Sevenraj Arts	
S E P T E M B E R	17	Jigiri Dost	S Mohan	Chethan Surya, Sushma, Skanda Ashok	Produced by A.N.S Productions	
S E P T E M B E R	24	Puksatte Lifu	Aravind Kuplikar	Sanchari Vijay, Matangi Prasann, Achyuth Kumar, Rangayana Raghu, Aravind Kuplikar, Lokesh Achar, Kiran Nayak	Produced by Sarvasva Productions	
S E P T E M B E R	24	Janumada Jaathre	Auto Anandh	Madan Kumar, Chaitra S., Mandya Kempa	Produced by Sri Manikuppe Anjaneya Swamy Productions	

== October – December ==
Opening		Title	Director	Cast	Note	Ref
O C T O B E R	1	Kaage Motte	B. K. Chandrahas	Gururaj Jaggesh, Thanuja, Madesha, Hemantha, Sathyajith	Produced by Skyline Studios; Red Chilli Cinemas	
O C T O B E R	1	Mohandas	P. Sheshadri	Samarth Hombal, Shruthi, Ananth Mahadevan, H. G. Dattatreya	Produced by Mitra Chitra	
O C T O B E R	8	Ninna Sanihake	Suraj Gowda	Suraj Gowda, Dhanya Ramkumar, Aruna Balraj, Manjunath Hegde	Produced by White and Grey Pictures	
O C T O B E R	8	Idu Akashavani Bengaluru Nilaya	M Hari Krishna	Ranvir Patil, Nikitha Swamy, Vinod Patil, Suchendra Prasad, Nagendra Shah, Narayan Swamy, Divya Shree, Tennis Krishna	Produced by Kamalananda Chitralaya Production Company	
O C T O B E R	8	Babu Marley	Mahi GYK	Meenakshi Dixit, Killer Venkatesh, Avinash Sampath	Produced by Jagan Mohan Productions	
O C T O B E R	8	Thirugso Meese	Krishna Vijay L	Sree Vishnu, Nikki Tamboli, Rohini Molleti	Produced by Krishna Vijay L Productions	
O C T O B E R	14	Salaga	Duniya Vijay	Duniya Vijay, Sanjana Anand, Dhananjay	Produced by Venus Enterrtainer	
O C T O B E R	15	Kotigobba 3	Shiva Karthik	Sudeep, Madonna Sebastian, Shraddha Das, Aftab Shivdasani, P. Ravi Shankar, Nawab Shah	Produced by Rambabu Production.	
O C T O B E R	15	SriKrishna@gmail.com	Nagashekar	Darling Krishna, Bhavana, Dattanna	Produced by Sandesh Productions	
O C T O B E R	15	1980	Rajkiran J	Priyanka Upendra, Sharanya Shetty	Produced by RK Productions; Direct OTT release – Namma Filx	
O C T O B E R	22	Rathnan Prapancha	Rohit Padaki	Dhananjay, Reba John, Umashree, Shruti, Ravishankar Gowda, Pramod Panju, Vainidhi Jagadish, Anu Prabhakar, Achyuth Kumar	Produced by KRG Studios; Direct OTT Release – Amazon Prime	
O C T O B E R	22	Real Estate	Sanjeev Gavandi	R Gururaj, Sushma Raj, Kempegowda, Mohan Juneja, Bhagyashree, Girish Jatti	Produced by N.R.K. Cinemas	
O C T O B E R	29	Bhajarangi 2	A. Harsha	Shiva Rajkumar, Bhavana, Shruti, Saurav Lokesh	Produced by Jayanna Films	
N O V E M B E R	5	Gulal.com	Shivu Jamakhandi	Tabla Nani, Bigboss Divakar, Nethra Gagan, Sadanand Kali, Shobharaj, Shankar Ambiger, Mallu Jamkhandi, Sonu Patil	Produced by JJ Cinemas Presents in association with DJ Cinema Creations.	
N O V E M B E R	5	Auto Ramanna	Auto Ramanna	Honnavalli Krishna, Mandeep Roy, Abinaya	Produced by Divya Sushma Creations.	
N O V E M B E R	12	Premam Poojyam	Raghavendra B. S.	Prem Kumar, Brinda Acharya, Aindrita Ray, Master Anand	Produced by Kedambaadi Creations	
N O V E M B E R	12	Tom and Jerry	Raaghav Vinay Shivagange	Nischith Korodi, Chaithra Rao, Tara, Jai Jagadish, Rockline Sudhakar, Kaddipudi Chandru, Padmaja Rao	Produced by Riddhi Siddhi Films	
N O V E M B E R	12	Hitler	Kinnal Raj	Lohith Nagaraj, Sasya, Manmohan Rai, Bala Rajwadi, Ganesh Rao	Produced by Gaanashiva Movies.	
N O V E M B E R	12	Buy 1 Get 1 Free	Harish Anilgod	Kishore, Rishitha Malnad, Madhu Mithun, Roshini Prakash	Produced by SBSC Creations.	
N O V E M B E R	12	Yarrabirri	Govind Dasar	Anjan, Sonu Patil	Produced by Das Cine Creations Pvt Ltd.	
N O V E M B E R	18	Lakshya	Ravi Sasanoor	Ramakrishna, Santhosh Raj Zavare, Sharmila Chandrashekar, Sathyanath, Nithinadvi, Sai Yashaswini	Produced by A Dream Pictures	
N O V E M B E R	19	100	Ramesh Aravind	Ramesh Aravind, Rachita Ram, Poorna, Vishwa Karna, Prakash Belawadi, Shobaraj, Raju Talikote	Produced by Suraj Productions	
N O V E M B E R	19	Garuda Gamana Vrishabha Vahana	Raj B. Shetty	Raj B. Shetty, Rishab Shetty, Gopalkrishna Deshpande	Produced by KRG Studios	
N O V E M B E R	19	Mugilpete	Bharat S. Navunda	Manoranjan Ravichandran, Kayadu Lohar, Tara, Avinash, Sadhu Kokila, Rangayana Raghu	Produced by Moti Movie Makers	
N O V E M B E R	19	Nan Hesaru Kishora Yel Pass Yentu	Bharathi Shankar	H. G. Dattatreya, Tabla Nani, Pavan Teja	Produced by Pathi Films	
N O V E M B E R	19	Snehitha	Sangeeth Sagar	Dhanush, Sulaksha Kaira, Shivaram	Produced by Roja Films	
N O V E M B E R	19	Saidapura	Sri Ram	Bhanu Prakash, Gururaj Hoskote, Basavaraj Sagar	Produced by B Ashok and Abdul Raouff Siddiquy.	
N O V E M B E R	26	Amruth Apartments	Gururaj Kulkarni Nadagoud	Tarak Ponnappa, Urvashi H. V., Balaji Manohar, Manasa Joshi, Sampath Kumar, Seetha Kote	Produced by G9 Communication Media & Entertainment	
N O V E M B E R	26	Gori Preethiya Samadhi	Gopal Krishna	Kiran Haveri, Smitha Haveri	Produced by Haveri Talkies	
N O V E M B E R	26	Govinda Govinda	Thilak	Sumanth Shailendra, Bhavana, Kavitha Gowda, Achyuth Kumar, Shobaraj, Roopesh Shetty, Sunetra Pandit, Ajay Ghosh	Produced by Shree Shailendra Productions	
N O V E M B E R	26	Sakath	Suni	Ganesh, Surbhi, Nishvika Naidu, Sadhu Kokila, Vihaan, Rangayana Raghu	Produced by KVN Productions	
D E C E M B E R	3	Akshi	Manoj Kumar	Govinde Gowda, Ila Vitla, Srinivas, Mithun, Sowmya Prabhu, Nagaraj Rao	Produced by Kaladegula Studio	
D E C E M B E R	3	Madhagaja	S. Mahesh Kumar	Sriimurali, Jagapathi Babu, Ashika Ranganath, Devayani, Rangayana Raghu, Chikkanna	Produced by Umapathy Films	
D E C E M B E R	10	Drishya 2	P. Vasu	Ravichandran, Navya Nair, Aarohi Narayan, Ananth Nag, Pramod Shetty, Asha Sharath, Prabhu	Produced by Zee Studios	
D E C E M B E R	17	Aana	Manoj P Nadalumane	Aditi Prabhudeva, Sunil Puranik, Chethan Gandharva, Ranvith Shivakumar	Produced by UK Productions	
D E C E M B E R	17	Kannadiga	B.M.Giriraj	Ravichandran, Pavana Gowda, Achyuth Kumar	Produced by Omkar movies ZEE5 film	
D E C E M B E R	24	Badava Rascal	Shankar Guru	Dhananjaya, Amrutha Iyengar, Nagabhushan, Poornachandra Mysore	Produced by Daali Pictures	
D E C E M B E R	24	Rider	Vijay Kumar Konda	Nikhil Kumar, Kashmira Pardeshi, Sampada Hulivana, H. G. Dattatreya, Achyuth Kumar, Chikkanna, Shivaraj K. R. Pete, Rajesh Nataranga, Anusha Rai	Produced by Lahari Films	
D E C E M B E R	31	Arjun Gowda	Lucky Shankar	Prajwal Devaraj, Priyanka Thimmesh, Rahul Dev, Sadhu Kokila, Sparsha Rekha	Produced by Ramu Films	
D E C E M B E R	31	Huttu Habbada Shubhashayagalu	Nagaraj Bethur	Diganth, Kavitha Gowda, Chethan Gandharva, Madanur Manu, Sharanya Shetty	Produced by Crystal Paark Cinemas	
D E C E M B E R	31	Love You Rachchu	Shankar S. Raj	Ajay Rao, Rachita Ram, Achyuth Kumar, Raghu Shivamogga, Arun Gowda, B. Suresha	Produced by G Cinemas, Guru Deshpande Production	
