= 10th South Indian International Movie Awards =

Indian annual film awards event

- Awarded for: Excellence in South Indian cinema and Music
- Announced on: 17 August 2022 (nominations)
- Presented on: 10–11 September 2022
- Site: Palace Ground, Bengaluru, India
- Hosted by: Ali; Rana Daggubati; Siddhu; Sreemukhi; Shiva; VJ Ramya; Akul Balaji; Sonu Gowda; Adil Ibrahim; Pearle Maaney
- Organized by: Vibri Media Group

Highlights
- Best Film: Pushpa: The Rise (Telugu); Garuda Gamana Vrishabha Vahana (Kannada); Minnal Murali (Malayalam); Sarpatta Parambarai (Tamil)
- Most awards: Pushpa: The Rise (Telugu) – 8
- Most nominations: Pushpa: The Rise (Telugu) – 12

Television coverage
- Channel: Gemini TV (Telugu); Sun TV (Tamil); Surya TV (Malayalam); Udaya TV (Kannada)
- Network: Sun TV Network

The 10th South Indian International Movie Awards is an awards event that took place in Bengaluru, India, on 10–11 September 2022. The ceremony (10th SIIMA) recognized and honored the best films and performances from Telugu, Tamil, Malayalam and Kannada films and music released in 2021, along with special honors for lifetime contributions and a few special awards.

The event was announced officially in early-August along with the date. On 17 August 2022, nominations for the Best Film category were announced along with the other categories. The first day of the ceremony (10 September 2022) awarded the best films and performances from the Telugu and Kannada cinema, whereas on the second day, best films and performances from the Tamil and Malayalam cinema were awarded.

Dhananjaya is nominated in three categories, the highest in a single year. He has become the first person to be nominated in three main acting categories, that is, Best Actor in a Leading Role – Kannada, Best Actor in a Supporting Role – Kannada and Best Actor in a Negative Role – Kannada. Pushpa: The Rise won eight awards from 12 nominations, thus becoming the most awarded and most nominated film of the year.

== Main awards ==
=== Film ===
Best Film
Telugu	Tamil
Pushpa: The Rise – Mythri Movie Makers, Muttamsetty Media; Akhanda – Dwaraka Creations; Love Story – Amigos Creations, Sree Venkateswara Cinemas; Jathi Ratnalu – Swapna Cinema; Uppena – Mythri Movie Makers, Sukumar Writings	Sarpatta Parambarai – Neelam Production; Maanaadu – V House Productions; Thalaivii – Vibri Motion Pictures, Karma Media; Doctor – KJR Studios; Karnan – V Creations; Mandela – YNOT Studios
Kannada	Malayalam
Garuda Gamana Vrishabha Vahana – Lighter Buddha Films; Roberrt – Umapathy Films; Yuvarathnaa – Hombale Films; Salaga – KP Srikanth; Bhajarangi 2 – Jayanna Combines	Minnal Murali – Weekend Blockbusters; Kurup – Wayfarer Films, M Star Entertainments; The Great Indian Kitchen – Mankind Cinemas, Symmetry Cinemas; Thinkalazhcha Nishchayam – Pushkar Films; Joji – Bhavana Studios, Working Class Hero, Fahadh Faasil and Friends
Best Director
Telugu	Tamil
Sukumar – Pushpa: The Rise; Boyapati Srinu – Akhanda; Gopichand Malineni – Krack; K. V. Anudeep – Jathi Ratnalu; Rahul Sankrityan – Shyam Singha Roy; Prasanth Varma – Zombie Reddy	Lokesh Kanagaraj – Master; Nelson – Doctor; Mari Selvaraj – Karnan; Pa. Ranjith – Sarpatta Parambarai; A. L. Vijay – Thalaivii; Venkat Prabhu – Maanaadu
Kannada	Malayalam
Tharun Sudhir – Roberrt; Rohit Padaki – Rathnan Prapancha; Raj B. Shetty – Garuda Gamana Vrishabha Vahana; S. Mahesh Kumar – Madhagaja; A. Harsha – Bhajarangi 2	Mahesh Narayanan – Malik; Jeethu Joseph – Drishyam 2; Dileesh Pothan – Joji; Senna Hegde – Thinkalazhcha Nishchayam; Basil Joseph – Minnal Murali
Best Cinematographer
Telugu	Tamil
C. Ram Prasad – Akhanda; Miroslaw Kuba Brozek – Pushpa: The Rise; G. K. Vishnu – Krack; Siddam Manohar – Jathi Ratnalu; Shamdat – Uppena; Shyam K. Naidu – Narappa	Shreyaas Krishna – Rocky; Theni Eswar – Karnan; Vishal Vittal – Thalaivii; S. R. Kathir – Jai Bhim; Sathyan Sooryan - Master
Kannada	Malayalam
Sudhakar S. Raj – Roberrt; Shreesha Kuduvalli – Rathnan Prapancha; Praveen Shriyan – Garuda Gamana Vrishabha Vahana; Shekhar Chandru – Kotigobba 3; Shivasena – Salaga	Nimish Ravi – Kurup; Madhu Neelakandan – Churuli; Sanu Varghese – Malik; Sameer Thahir – Minnal Murali; Shyju Khalid – Nayattu

=== Acting ===
Best Actor
Telugu	Tamil
Allu Arjun – Pushpa: The Rise; Balakrishna – Akhanda; Naveen Polishetty – Jathi Ratnalu; Allari Naresh – Naandhi; Naga Chaitanya – Love Story; Nani – Shyam Singha Roy	Sivakarthikeyan – Doctor; Silambarasan – Maanaadu; Vijay – Master; Suriya – Jai Bhim; Dhanush – Karnan; Arya – Sarpatta Parambarai
Kannada	Malayalam
Puneeth Rajkumar – Yuvarathnaa (Note: Awarded posthumously.); Darshan – Roberrt; Rishab Shetty – Garuda Gamana Vrishabha Vahana; Dhananjaya – Badava Rascal; Shiva Rajkumar – Bhajarangi 2; Ganesh – Sakath	Tovino Thomas – Minnal Murali and Kala; Biju Menon – Aarkkariyam; Dulquer Salmaan – Kurup; Jayasurya – Vellam; Fahadh Faasil – Malik; Joju George – Nayattu
Best Actress
Telugu	Tamil
Pooja Hegde – Most Eligible Bachelor; Rashmika Mandanna – Pushpa: The Rise; Shruti Haasan – Krack; Priyamani – Narappa; Sai Pallavi – Love Story; Pragya Jaiswal – Akhanda	Kangana Ranaut – Thalaivii; Nayanthara – Netrikann; Lijomol Jose – Jai Bhim; Keerthi Pandian – Anbirkiniyal; Aishwarya Rajesh – Thittam Irandu
Kannada	Malayalam
Ashika Ranganath – Madhagaja; Rashmika Mandanna – Pogaru; Rachita Ram – Love You Rachchu; Amrutha Iyengar – Badava Rascal; Nishvika Naidu – Sakath	Aishwarya Lekshmi – Kaanekkaane; Parvathy Thiruvothu – Aarkkariyam; Rajisha Vijayan – Love; Mamta Mohandas – Bhramam; Sobhita Dhulipala – Kurup; Nimisha Sajayan – The Great Indian Kitchen
Best Actor in a Supporting Role
Telugu	Tamil
Jagadeesh Prathap Bandari – Pushpa: The Rise; Rahul Ramakrishna – Jathi Ratnalu; Sai Kumar – SR Kalyanamandapam; Jagapathi Babu – Maha Samudram; Priyadarshi – Jathi Ratnalu	Arvind Swamy – Thalaivii; Samuthirakani – Thalaivii; Lal – Karnan; Mahendran – Master; Pasupathy – Sarpatta Parambarai; K. Manikandan – Jai Bhim
Kannada	Malayalam
Pramod Panju – Rathnan Prapancha; Dhananjaya – Salaga; Pramod Shetty – Drishya 2; Gopalkrishna Deshpande – Garuda Gamana Vrishabha Vahana; Nagabhushana N S – Badava Rascal	Baburaj – Joji; Sumesh Moor – Kala; Chemban Vinod Jose – Churuli; Sharaf U Dheen – Aarkkariyam; Murali Gopy – Drishyam 2
Best Actress in a Supporting Role
Telugu	Tamil
Varalaxmi Sarathkumar – Krack; Ramya Krishna – Republic; Nivetha Thomas – Vakeel Saab; Poorna – Akhanda; Nivetha Pethuraj – Red	Lakshmi Priyaa Chandramouli – Karnan; Rajisha Vijayan – Jai Bhim; Anupama Kumar – Sarpatta Parambarai; Easwari Rao – Theal; Raveena Ravi – Rocky
Kannada	Malayalam
Aarohi Narayan – Drishya 2; Sonu Gowda – Yuvarathnaa; Sonal monteiro – Roberrt; Anusha Rai – Rider; Vainidhi Jagadish – Rathnan Prapancha	Unnimaya Prasad – Joji; Shelly Kishore – Minnal Murali; Mamitha Baiju – Kho-Kho; Shruti Ramachandran – Kaanekkaane; Manju Pillai – Home
Best Actor in a Negative Role
Telugu	Tamil
Srikanth – Akhanda; Vijay Sethupathi – Uppena; Siddharth – Maha Samudram; Samuthirakani – Krack; Sunil – Pushpa: The Rise	S. J. Suryah – Maanaadu; Vijay Sethupathi – Master; Vinay Rai – Doctor; Ajmal Ameer – Netrikann; Bharathiraja – Rocky; Natty Subramaniam – Karnan
Kannada	Malayalam
Pramod Shetty – Hero; Yash Shetty – Salaga; Dhananjaya – Yuvarathnaa; Raj B. Shetty – Garuda Gamana Vrishabha Vahana; Ramachandra Raju – Madhagaja	Guru Somasundaram – Minnal Murali; Shine Tom Chacko – Kurup; Jinu Joseph – Bheemante Vazhi; Irshad Ali – Wolf; Dileesh Pothan – Malik
Best Comedian
Telugu	Tamil
Sudarshan – Ek Mini Katha; Saptagiri – Varudu Kaavalenu; Getup Srinu – Zombie Reddy; Vennela Kishore – Rang De; Ajay Ghosh – Manchi Rojulochaie	Redin Kingsley and Deepa Shankar – Doctor; Soori – Annaatthe; Munishkanth – Bachelor; Yogi Babu – Aranmanai 3
Kannada	Malayalam
Chikkanna – Pogaru; Rangayana Raghu – Badava Rascal; P. Ravi Shankar – Kotigobba 3; Sadhu Kokila – Sakath; Raju Talikote – 100	Naslen – Home; Basil Joseph – Jan.E.Man; Aju Varghese – Minnal Murali; Vinay Forrt – Mohan Kumar Fans; Johny Antony – Home

=== Debut awards ===
Best Debut Actor
Telugu	Tamil
Vaisshnav Tej – Uppena; Pradeep Machiraju – 30 Rojullo Preminchadam Ela; Teja Sajja – Zombie Reddy; Satya – Vivaha Bhojanambu; Vikas Vasistha – Cinema Bandi	Subash Selvam – Thittam Irandu; Rasu Ranjith – Theethum Nandrum; Vatsan M. Natarajan – Kayamai Kadakka; Kutty Mani – Methagu; Vasanth Selvam – Kadaseela Biriyani
Kannada	Malayalam
Nagabhushana N S – Ikkat; Govinde Gowda – Akshi; Aryan Gowda – Vikky; Madan Kumar – Janumada Jatre	Sanal Aman – Malik; Dineesh P – Nayattu; Joji Mundakayam – Joji; Jay J Jakkrit – Marakkar: Lion of the Arabian Sea; Alex Alister – Joji
Best Debut Actress
Telugu	Tamil
Krithi Shetty – Uppena; Sreeleela – Pelli SandaD; Faria Abdullah – Jathi Ratnalu; Sandhya Raju – Natyam; Meenakshi Chaudhary – Ichata Vahanamulu Niluparadu	Priyanka Mohan – Doctor; Dushara Vijayan – Sarpatta Parambarai; Rajisha Vijayan – Karnan; Malavika Mohanan – Master; Abarnathi – Thaen
Kannada	Malayalam
Sharanya Shetty – 1980; Dhanya Ramkumar – Ninna Sanihake; Asha Bhat – Roberrt; Bhoomi Shetty – Ikkat; Ganavi Laxman – Hero	Anagha Narayanan – Thinkalazhcha Nishchayam; Femina George – Minnal Murali; Yama Gilgamesh – Nayattu; Ajisha Prabhakaran – Thinkalazhcha Nishchayam; Gopika Udayan – Kunjeldho
Best Debut Director
Telugu	Tamil
Buchi Babu Sana – Uppena; Vijay Kanakamedala – Naandhi; Hasith Goli – Raja Raja Chora; Sridhar Gade – SR Kalyanamandapam; Praveen Kandregula – Cinema Bandi	Madonne Ashwin – Mandela; Arun Matheshwaran – Rocky; Nishanth Kalidindi – Kadaseela Biriyani; Franklin Jacob – Writer; Sathish Selvakumar – Bachelor
Kannada	Malayalam
Guru Shankar – Badava Rascal; Aravind Kuplikar – Puksatte Lifu; Duniya Vijay – Salaga; Suraj Gowda – Ninna Sanihake; Shankar Raj – Love You Rachchu	Kavya Prakash – Vaanku; Sanu Varghese – Aarkkariyam; Tharun Moorthy – Operation Java; Jeeva K J – Richter Scale 7.6; Chidambaram S Poduval – Jan.E.Man
Best Debut Producer
Telugu	Tamil
Satish Varma (SV2 Entertainment) – Naandhi; Venkat Boyanapalli (Niharika Entertainment) – Shyam Singha Roy; Raj Sekhar Varma (Apple Trees Studios) – Zombie Reddy; Pramod, Raju (Elite Entertainments) – SR Kalyanamandapam; Ramesh Karutoori, Venki Pushadapu, Gnana Shekar V.S (Kria Film Corp, Kali Productions) – Gamanam	RA Studios – Rocky; Abbudu Studios – Kamali from Nadukkaveri; AP Productions – Thaen; Ekka Entertainments – Lift; Rowdy Pictures – Pebbles (Koozhangal)
Kannada	Malayalam
KRG Studios – Rathnan Prapancha; Daali Pictures – Badava Rascal; Kalaadegula Studio – Akshi; White and Grey Pictures – Ninna Sanihake; Lia Global Media – Groufie	Friendly Productions – Vellam; Cheers Entertainment – Jan.E.Man; Nationwide Pictures – Thirike; Zsazsa Productions – Aaha; Mankind Cinemas & Symmetry Cinemas – The Great Indian Kitchen

=== Music ===
Best Music Director
Telugu	Tamil
Devi Sri Prasad – Pushpa: The Rise; Thaman S – Akhanda; Pawan Ch – Love Story; Gopi Sundar – Most Eligible Bachelor; Radhan – Jathi Ratnalu	Santhosh Narayanan – Karnan; Yuvan Shankar Raja – Maanaadu; Anirudh Ravichander – Master; G. V. Prakash Kumar – Thalaivii; Ghibran – Maara
Kannada	Malayalam
Arjun Janya – Roberrt; Raghu Dixit – Ninna Sanihake; Thaman S – Yuvarathnaa; Vasuki Vaibhav – Badava Rascal; Midhun Mukundan – Garuda Gamana Vrishabha Vahana	Bijibal – Vellam; Sushin Shyam – Kurup; Ronnie Raphael – Marakkar: Lion of the Arabian Sea; Ranjin Raj – Kaanekkaane; Hesham Abdul Wahab & Govind Vasantha – Madhuram
Best Lyricist
Telugu	Tamil
Chandrabose – "Srivalli" from Pushpa: The Rise; Mittapalli Surender – "Nee Chitram Choosi" from Love Story; Sri Mani – "Leharaayi" from Most Eligible Bachelor; Ramajogayya Sastry – "Maguva Maguva" from Vakeel Saab; Kalyan Chakravarthy – "Amma Song" from Akhanda	Karthik Netha – "Idhuvum Kadandhu" – Netrikann; Madhan Karky – "En Iniya Thanimaiye" – Teddy; Thamarai – "Yaar Azhaipadhu" – Maara; Arun Prabhu Purushothaman – "Inba Visai" – Vaazhl; Yugabharathi – "Saare Kaathe" from Annaatthe
Kannada	Malayalam
Vasuki Vaibhav – "Ninna Sanihake" from Ninna Sanihake; Rohit Padaki – "Alemaariye" from Rathnan Prapancha; Yogaraj Bhat – "Kannu Hodiyaka" from Roberrt; K. Kalyan – "Nee Sigoovaregu" from Bhajarangi 2; Mathews Manu – "Haayagide" from Tom & Jerry	Muhsin Parari – "Oruthi" from Bheemante Vazhi; Anwar Ali – "Pakaliravukal" from Kurup; Manu Manjith – "Uyire" from Minnal Murali; Nidheesh Naderi – "Akashamayavale" from Vellam; Vinayak Shashikumar – "Paalnilaavin" from Kaanekkaane
Best Male Playback Singer
Telugu	Tamil
Ram Miriyala – "Chitti" from Jathi Ratnalu; Sid Sriram – "Srivalli" from Pushpa: The Rise; Anurag Kulkarni – "Nee Chitram Choosi" from Love Story; Javed Ali, Sreekanth Chandra – "Nee Kannu Neeli Samudram" from Uppena; Penchal Das – "Bhalegundi Baalaa" from Sreekaram	Kapil Kapilan – "Adiye" from Bachelor; Sid Sriram – "Idhuvum Kadandhu Pogum" from Netrikann; Pradeep Kumar – "Naan" from Vaazhl; S. P. Balasubrahmanyam – "Annathe Annathe" from Annaatthe; Anirudh Ravichander – "Chellamma" from Doctor
Kannada	Malayalam
Armaan Malik, Thaman S – "Neenade Naa" from Yuvarathnaa; Chandan Shetty – "Karabu" from Pogaru; Vijay Prakash – "Pataki Poriyo" from Kotigobba 3; Shankar Mahadevan – "Jai Sriram" from Roberrt; Sid Sriram – "Hayagide" from Tom and Jerry	Mithun Jayaraj – "Uyire" from Minnal Murali; K. S. Harisankar – "Kaamini" from Anugraheethan Antony; Shahabaz Aman – "Akashamayavale" from Vellam; Pradeep Kumar – "Nee Parimitha Neram" from Madhuram; M. G. Sreekumar – "Ilaveyil" from Marakkar: Lion of the Arabian Sea
Best Female Playback Singer
Telugu	Tamil
Geetha Madhuri – "Jai Balayya" from Akhanda; Mangli – "Saranga Dariya" from Love Story; Mounika Yadav – "Saami Saami" from Pushpa: The Rise; Indravathi Chauhan – "Oo Antava Oo Oo Antava" from Pushpa: The Rise; Shreya Ghoshal – "Jala Jala Jalapaatham Nuvvu" from Uppena	Dhee – "Uttradheenga Yeppov" from Karnan; Sri Vardhini, Aditi, Satya Yamini, Roshni & Tejaswini – "Tum Tum" from Enemy; Jonita Gandhi – "Chellamma" from Doctor; Padmalatha – "Theeranadhi" from Maara; Shreya Ghoshal – "Saara Kaathe" from Annaatthe
Kannada	Malayalam
Chaithra J Achar – "Sojugada Soojumallige" from Garuda Gamana Vrishabha Vahana; Ramya Behara – "Oorigobba Raja" from Yuvarathnaa; Rakshita Suresh – "Nee Parichaya" from Ninna Sanihake; Shreya Ghoshal – "Kannu Hodiyaka" from Roberrt; Anuradha Bhat – "Pataki Poriyo" from Kotigobba 3	Sujatha Mohan – "Neelambale" from The Priest; Sithara Krishnakumar – "Palnilavin Poykayil" from Kaanekkaane; Shweta Mohan – "Mayakondu" from Chathur Mukham; Neha Nair – "Pakaliravukal" from Kurup; K. S. Chithra – "Theerame" from Malik

== Critics' choice awards ==
Telugu cinema

- Best Actor – Naveen Polishetty – Jathi Ratnalu
- Best Actress – Pooja Hegde – Most Eligible Bachelor

Tamil cinema

- Best Actor – Arya – Sarpatta Parambarai
- Best Actress – Aishwarya Rajesh – Thittam Irandu

Kannada cinema

- Best Actor - Darshan – Roberrt
- Best Actress – Amrutha Iyengar – Badava Rascal

Malayalam cinema

- Best Actor – Biju Menon – Aarkkariyam
- Best Actress – Nimisha Sajayan – The Great Indian Kitchen

== Special awards ==
- Special Jury Award for Best Production Design – S. Rama Krishna and Monika Niggotre S. – Pushpa: The Rise, Uppena and Thalaivii
- Most Promising Newcomer (Male) – Teja Sajja – Zombie Reddy
- Most Promising Newcomer (Female) – Sreeleela – Pelli SandaD
- Youth Icon South (Male) – Vijay Deverakonda
- Youth Icon South (Female) – Pooja Hegde
- Most Popular Hindi actor in South India – Ranveer Singh
- Special Appreciation Movie – Omkaar Movies – Kannadiga
- Sensation of Kannada cinema – Dhananjaya
- Original Pan Indian Superstar – Kamal Haasan
- Outstanding Performance of the Year – Yogi Babu – Mandela
- Decade of Excellence in South Indian Cinema – Hansika Motwani
- Entertainer of the Year (Male) – Nandamuri Balakrishna – Akhanda
- Entertainer of the Year (Female) – Sai Pallavi – Love Story and Shyam Singha Roy

== Superlatives ==
Films with multiple nominations
Nominations	Film
12	Pushpa: The Rise
10	Akhanda
10	Karnan
10	Minnal Murali
10	Roberrt
9	Doctor
8	Jathi Ratnalu
8	Uppena
8	Kurup
8	Garuda Gamana Vrishabha Vahana
7	Master
7	Thalaivii
7	Badava Rascal
6	Malik
6	Joji
6	Yuvarathnaa
5	Love Story
5	Krack
5	Salaga
5	Rathnan Prapancha
5	Ninna Sanihake
4	Kotigobba 3
4	Zombie Reddy
4	Bhajarangi 2
4	Salaga
3	Krack
3	Shyam Singha Roy
3	Most Eligible Bachelor
3	SR Kalyanamandapam
3	Naandhi
3	Madhagaja
3	Sakath
3	Pogaru
2	Narappa
2	Maha Samudram
2	Vakeel Saab
2	Cinema Bandi
2	Love You Rachchu
2	Drishya 2
2	Hero
2	Akshi
2	Ikkat
2	Tom & Jerry

Films with multiple awards
Awards	Film
8	Pushpa: The Rise
4	Minnal Murali
4	Akhanda
4	Uppena
3	Roberrt
2	Badava Rascal
2	Jathi Ratnalu
2	Joji
2	Garuda Gamana Vrishabha Vahana
2	Malik
2	Yuvarathnaa
2	Vellam
2	Thittam Irandu
2	Sarpatta Parambarai

== Presenters and performers ==
Presenters
Award	Presenter
Best Cinematographer – Telugu	Shubra Aiyappa; Maheswari
Best Lyricist – Telugu	Mannara Chopra
Best Supporting Actress – Telugu	Bindu Madhavi
Best Debut Director – Telugu	Vivek Agnihotri
Best Debut Producer – Telugu	Sudheer Babu; Ritika Singh
Youth Icon South (Male)	Shiva Rajkumar
Youth Icon South (Female)	Sreemukhi
Best Director – Telugu	Allu Arjun; Rockline Venkatesh
Best Film – Telugu	Dhananjaya
Most Promising Newcomer (Male)	Rhea Chakraborty
Best Actress – Telugu	Sumalatha
Best Male Playback Singer– Kannada	Deepak
Best Actress – Kannada	Sumalatha
Critics Choice Best Actress – Kannada	Sumalatha
Best Supporting Actor– Kannada	Bindu Madhavi
Best Actor in a Negative Role – Kannada	Sushanth
Most Popular Hindi actor in South India	Sukumar
Best Comedian – Kannada	Dhananjaya
Best Debut Actress – Kannada	Shalini Pandey
Best Director – Kannada	Rockline Venkatesh
Sensation of Kannada cinema	Rockline Venkatesh
Special Appreciation Award	Allu Aravind
Best Film – Kannada	Allu Aravind

Performers
Name	Work
Usha Uthup	Singing
Siddhu Jonnalagadda	Dance
Bindu Madhavi	Dance
Faria Abdullah	Dance
Hansika Motwani	Dance
Sreeleela	Dance
Nidhhi Agerwal	Dance
