= Vidyapati (2025 film) =

2025 Indian comedy drama film

- Theatrical release poster
- Directed by: Haseen Khan; Esham Khan
- Written by: Haseen Khan; Esham Khan
- Produced by: Dhananjaya
- Starring: Nagabhushana; Malaika T. Vasupal
- Cinematography: Lavith
- Edited by: Haseen Khan; Esham Khan
- Music by: Dossmode
- Production company: Daali Pictures
- Release date: 10 April 2025
- Running time: 126 minutes
- Country: India
- Language: Kannada

Vidyapati (transl. Vidya's husband) is a 2025 Indian Kannada-language comedy drama film written, directed and edited by Haseen Khan and Esham Khan. The film stars Nagabhushana and Malaika T. Vasupal.

== Cast ==
- Nagabhushana as Siddu aka Vidyapati
- Malaika Vasupal as Vidaya
- Prathiksha Bharadwaj as Rashmi
- Karthik Rao
- Ramachandra Raju as Jaggu
- Srivatsa Shyam as Kumara
- Nagaraj bandari
- Rangayana Raghu (Cameo appearance)
- Dhananjaya as Anaconda (Cameo appearance)

== Production ==
In January 2024, it was reported that Nagabhushana would collaborate with director duo Haseen Khan and Esham Khan on their second collaboration, Vidyapati, after Ikkat. Malaika T. Vasupal was announced to play the female lead in the film in February 2024. In March 2024, it was reported that Rangayana Raghu would be part of the film, playing a Kung-fu master character. The film was produced by Dhananjaya under his banner Daali Pictures. Ramachandra Raju was chosen to portray the antagonist role after the duo Haseen Khan and Esham Khan received a suggestion from Dhananjaya to cast him as the antagonist.

== Soundtrack ==
The soundtrack was composed by Dossmode.

Track listing
| No. | Title | Lyrics | Singer(s) | Length |
|---|---|---|---|---|
| 1. | "Madanaari" | Sujith Venkataramaiah | Vasuki Vaibhav, Supriyaa Ram | 2:49 |
| 2. | "Ayyo Vidhiye" | Sujith Venkataramaiah | Jaggesh | 4:13 |
| Total length: | | | | 7:02 |

== Release ==
Vidyapati was released theatrically on 10 April 2025.

== Reception ==
Sridevi S. of The Times of India rated the film three out of five stars and wrote, "The film is an entertainment package filled with little fun and lot of drama. If you like clean comedy, and family dramas that doesn’t really tug the heart’s strings but still impacts emotionally, Vidyapati delivers it." Y. Maheswara Reddy of Bangalore Mirror wrote, "Vidyapati is the second movie for Esham and Hasheen after the film Ikkat. Though they made Nagabhushana to play the lead in this movie, it was the incongruous script that failed to connect with the audiences."

Pranati A. S. of Deccan Herald gave the film three out of five stars and wrote, "Vidyapati is an enjoyable film despite its shortcomings–it picks broadstroke storytelling over manipulative storytelling." Prathibha Joy of OTTplay gave it three out of five stars and wrote, "Nagabhushana is firmly in the spotlight and the actor holds it together well, with a good blend of humour, emotions and some action too." Vivek M. V. of The Hindu wrote, "Vidyapati offers something for everyone without being an overdose of themes."

Sanjay Ponnappa of India Today gave it two-and-a-half out of five stars and wrote, "The writer-director duo Esham and Haseen seem to have developed an entire screenplay based on an interesting one-liner but chose the most orthodox pattern to pen their proceedings. There is a lack of innovation in the presentation, which acts as a major drawback." A. Sharadhaa of The New Indian Express wrote, "Vidyapati offers quirky misadventures and light-hearted fun—with just enough bite to keep things meaningful. However, it is messy in parts, melodramatic, and sometimes bizarre—but that’s its charm."
