= Yaanai =

2022 film directed by Hari

- Theatrical release poster
- Directed by: Hari
- Written by: Hari
- Produced by: Vedikkaranpatti S. Sakthivel
- Starring: Arun Vijay; Priya Bhavani Shankar; Ramachandra Raju
- Cinematography: S. Gopinath
- Edited by: Anthony
- Music by: G. V. Prakash Kumar
- Production company: Drumsticks Productions
- Distributed by: KKR Cinemas
- Release date: 1 July 2022 (India)
- Running time: 156 minutes
- Country: India
- Language: Tamil
- Budget: ₹15 crore
- Box office: ₹65 crore

Yaanai (transl. Elephant) is a 2022 Indian Tamil-language action drama film directed by Hari and produced by Vedikkaranpatti S. Sakthivel under the banner of Drumsticks Productions. The film stars Arun Vijay and Priya Bhavani Shankar with Ramachandra Raju, Samuthirakani, Rajesh, Radhika Sarathkumar, Aishwariyaa Bhaskaran, Ammu Abhirami, Yogi Babu and Pugazh and others in supporting roles. G.V. Prakash Kumar composed the soundtrack and the background score, while Gopinath and Anthony handled the cinematography and editing.

It is the second collaboration of Arun Vijay and Priya Bhavani Shankar after Mafia: Chapter 1 and Vijay's first collaboration with Hari. It was shot extensively across Tamil Nadu including Ramanathapuram, Rameshwaram, Thoothukudi, Palani and the final schedule was wrapped up in Karaikudi.

Yaanai was released on 1 July 2022 to positive reviews from critics and became a commercial success at the box office.

== Plot ==
P.R.Veerapandiyan, alias PRV, is an influential person in the Ramanathapuram district and runs multiple business ventures spanning Rameswaram. PRV has four sons: Ramachandran, Sivachandran, Jayachandran and Ravichandran "Ravi". Ramachandran, Sivachandran and Jayachandran are PRV's deceased wife's sons, while Ravi is from PRV's second wife, Muthaaram. Ravi loves his brothers dearly, but they covertly disregard him as their half-brother. Ramachandran manages the main business with Sivachandran and Jayachandran, while Ravi manages their low-income properties and his buses.

Samuthiram, who is PRV's former friend from Rameswaram, blames his family for the death of his younger son Pandi and is out to avenge him with Pandi's twin brother, Lingam, who is currently in prison for killing DSP Thiyagarajan. In a flashback, 7 years ago, Pandi killed Ravi's friend by throwing him off the Ramanathapuram-Rameswaram Pamban bridge. Ravi, the victim's classmate, made legal proceedings, which got Pandi arrested. Samuthiram personally met with PRV and asked for a truce between them and the dead guy's family. While PRV agreed, his three elder sons refused since the dead guy was from their caste. In a meeting between the victim's family and Samudhram's family, chaos erupts, and Pandi tries to shoot Ravi. Out of options, Thiyagarajan killed Pandi. The next day, Lingam killed Thiyagarajan by dragging him into the sea to avenge Pandi's death, but he got caught and punished with 7 years imprisonment. Ravi also falls in love with Jebamalar, who eventually reciprocates his feelings. Lingam soon gets released from prison, and Ravi realises that Lingam is out for his family's blood, so he secretly tries to protect his family.

Ravi soon stumbles upon his half-niece and Ramachandran's daughter Selvi, alias Paappa's relationship with a Muslim boy named Raheem. Ravi accepts their relationship and tries to prevent Paappa from making hasty decisions, but Paappa elopes with Raheem with the help of Jebamalar. Ravi's caste-fanatic brothers blame him for his inaction despite knowing of Paappa's affair, where they oust him and Muthaaram from their house, and PRV dies from the resulting distress. During his funeral, Ravi's half-brothers forbade Ravi from seeing his father for one last time, but they allowed Lingam and Samuthiram. This incident enraged Muthaaram, and she ridicules Ravi's half-brothers. Ramachandran orders Paappa's death to protect his honour after losing his respect and status.

Ravi decides to take the matter into his own hands and tries to locate Pappa. After intense efforts, Ravi finds Paappa in Nagore, but Raheem is missing. Ravi brings her back to their house, where Ramachandran attempts to kill her, but Ravi stops Ramachandran and warns him. Ravi's brothers decide to team up with Lingam to kill Ravi's household. Ravi tracks down Raheem, who Lingam kidnapped, and reunites Raheem with his parents. At night, Lingam's men barge into Ravi's house while he is not home. Although Paappa and Muthaaram try to stop them from breaking into the house, Lingam and his men manage to enter and start attacking them.

Ravi arrives in time to protect his family from Lingam's attack. Ramachandran gets backstabbed by some of his men, having been bribed by Lingam (who tries to double-cross the brothers), but Ramachandran manages to survive the attack. Muthaaram and Paappa get brutally injured and get admitted to the hospital. Ravi enters their house and tearfully reveals that he has chosen to sever the ties with the family. A guilty Ramachandran reconciles with Ravi, but Lingam kidnaps Jayachandran's child. Ravi begs Lingam to leave her alone, but Lingam doesn't budge.

However, Samuthiram is disgusted at Lingam for trying to kill a child instead of the brothers and distracts him for the child to escape. Lingam tussles with Samuthiram and chases after the girl. Ravi arrives promptly to save her and chases Lingam to an island nearby. Ravi thrashes Lingam but spares him since he is about to become a father, thus ending the feud peacefully. Paappa and Raheem reunite with Ramachandran, and the PRV brothers accept Ravi as their brother.

== Cast ==
- Arun Vijay as Ravichandran
- Priya Bhavani Shankar as Jebamalar
- Ramachandra Raju in a dual role as:
  - Lingam, Pandi's twin brother
  - Pandi, Lingam's twin brother
- Samuthirakani as Ramachandran, Ravi's elder half-brother
- Rajesh as P.R.Veerapandiyan "PRV", Ravi's father
- Radhika Sarathkumar as Muthaaram, PRV's wife and Ravi's mother
- Aishwariyaa Bhaskaran as Ramachandran's wife and Selvi's mother
- Ammu Abhirami as Selvi alias Paapa, Ramachandran's daughter
- Yogi Babu as Jimmy
- V. I. S. Jayapalan as Samuthiram, Lingam and Pandi's father
- Bose Venkat as Sivachandran, Ravi's elder half-brother
- Sanjeev Venkat as Jayachandran, Ravi's elder half-brother
- Thalaivasal Vijay as Jacob, Jebamalar's father
- Rama as Jebarani, Jebamalar's mother
- Imman Annachi as Mukkaiya, Ravi's uncle
- M Chandrakumar as Kadarkarai, Samuthiram's friend
- O. A. K. Sundar as Annachchi
- Snehan as Selvi's college professor
- C. Ranganathan as a marriage broker
- Jeevitha as Sivachandran’s wife
- Sarayu as Jayachandran’s wife
- Subhashini Kannan as Lingam’s wife
- Janaki Devi as Jebakanya, Jebamalar’s sister
- Rajendran as Veriyan
- Pugazh as Parattai
- Ganja Karuppu as Chinnaiah
- Bharathi Kannan as Adv. Sengottuvan
- Gangai Amaran as a priest (cameo appearance)
- Srividya as PRV's first wife (photo presence only)

== Production ==
=== Development ===
The film was tentatively titled AV33. On September 9, 2021, the film's official title was unveiled as Yaanai by 33 prominent Indian celebrities such as Anurag Kashyap, Vijay Sethupathi, Arya, Pa. Ranjith, Vignesh Shivan, Keerthy Suresh and many more others.

=== Casting ===
Priya Bhavani Shankar was cast in as the female lead opposite Arun Vijay, marking their second collaboration after Mafia: Chapter 1. Ramachandra Raju was reported to play dual roles in the film while veteran actress Radhika and other actors and actresses like Yogi Babu, Samuthirakani, and Ammu Abhirami appear were cast in other pivotal roles.

=== Filming ===
Principal photography of the film began on 3 March 2021 and wrapped up on 7 December 2021.

== Music ==
Yaanai

Soundtrack album by G.V. Prakash Kumar
- Released: 2022
- Recorded: 2022
- Genre: Feature film soundtrack
- Length: 28:09
- Language: Tamil
- Label: Drumsticks Productions
- Producer: G. V. Prakash Kumar

G.V. Prakash Kumar chronology
Ayngaran (2022)	Yaanai (2022)	Sardar (2022)

Singles from Yaanai
- 1. "Yelamma Yela" Released: 13 January 2022; 2. "Bodhaiya Vittu Vaale" Released: 11 February 2022; 3. "Sandaaliye" Released: 17 June 2022

G. V. Prakash Kumar composed the soundtrack and background score of the film while collaborating with actor Arun Vijay for the first time and director Hari for the second time after Seval. The lyrics for the songs are written by Snehan, Ekadasi, Arivu and Hari. The first single "Yelamma Yela" was released on 13 January 2022. The second single " Bodhaiya Vittu Vaale" was released on 11 February 2022. The third single is "Sandaaliye" was released on 17 June 2022. The full album was released by Drumsticks Productions on 30 June 2022.

Track listing
No.	Title	Lyrics	Singer(s)	Length
1.	"Yelamma Yela"	Snehan	Arya Dhayal	4:09
2.	"Bodhaiya Vittu Vaale"	Arivu	G. V. Prakash Kumar, Arivu, Santhosh Hariharan	4:14
3.	"Sandaaliye"	Snehan	Velmurugan, Roshini	4:23
4.	"Enna Othaiyila"	Ekadasi	Velmurugan	4:31
5.	"Ganapathy Saranam"	Hari	Saindhavi	2:14
6.	"Deiva Magale"	Hari	Saindhavi	3:24
7.	"Edhanaala Varutham"	Hari	Anthony Daasan	3:24
8.	"Yelamma Yela - Version 2"	Snehan	G. V. Prakash Kumar	4:04
Total length:				28:09

== Release ==
=== Theatrical ===
The teaser trailer of the film was released on 23 December 2021. The film was initially planned for release in theatres on 6 May 2022, but got postponed due to lack of adequate screens. It was later scheduled for 17 June 2022 but got postponed again due to Kamal Haasan's Vikram for record-breaking success. The film was finally released in theatres on 1 July 2022.

=== Distribution ===
The film is distributed in Tamil Nadu by KKR Cinemas.

=== Home media ===
The post-theatrical streaming rights of the film were bought by ZEE5 and the satellite rights of the film were bought by Zee Tamil and Zee Thirai. The film is scheduled to digitally stream on ZEE5 from 19 August 2022 after completing its 50-day theatrical run.

== Reception ==
=== Critical response ===
Yaanai received positive reviews from critics.

Navein Darshan of The New Indian Express gave 3.5/5 stars and wrote "When mainstream cinema brings such wholesomeness and depth, they do warrant some forgiveness from us for its flaws." M. Suganth of The Times of India gave 3/5 stars and wrote "The hero protecting his family from the villain is a trope that Hari often resorts to and the director manages to present this with slight variations to make the story not become too predictable." Karthik Keramalu of Firstpost gave 3/5 stars and wrote "Love alone doesn’t win at the end of the day in Yaanai. Dysfunctional families that remain functional during a malfunction also win here."

Bhavana Sharma of Pinkvilla gave 3/5 stars and wrote "On the whole, Yaanai is a film that is definitely worth a watch this weekend. It is a typical Tamil film which gives importance to family values and tells people to be kind." Behindwoods gave 2.5/5 stars and wrote "Yaanai is the kind of film that you might enjoy if you're a fan of Hari. Arun Vijay's performance, GV Prakash's music and Hari's family drama elements make the film a watchable commercial entertainer." S.Subhakeerthana of OTT Play gave 1.5/5 stars and wrote "Yaanai, headlined by Arun Vijay, is an uninventive old-school melodrama that delivers customary goods. An average time-pass film that sticks to a tried and tested formula."

Praveen Sudevan of The Hindu wrote "Thankfully, the camera doesn’t move like it is attached to a roller-coaster. But ‘Yaanai’ is tedious with outdated elements." Sruthi Ganapathy Raman of Film Companion wrote "Despite the tropes associated with a masala potboiler, the makers manage to produce a watchable mass film and that is because they know exactly what their movie stands for."
