= Maduveya Mamatheya Kareyole =

- Film poster
- Directed by: Kaviraj
- Screenplay by: Kaviraj
- Story by: Kaviraj
- Produced by: Meena Thoogudeepa Srinivas
- Starring: Suraj Gowda; Amulya; Ananth Nag; Achyuth Kumar
- Cinematography: K. S. Chandrashekar
- Edited by: K. M. Prakash
- Music by: V. Harikrishna
- Production company: Thoogudeepa Productions
- Distributed by: Thoogudeepa Distributors
- Release date: 8 January 2016
- Running time: 136 minutes
- Country: India
- Language: Kannada

Maduveya Mamatheya Kareyole is a 2016 Indian Kannada-language romantic comedy film written directed by Kaviraj in his directorial debut. It stars Suraj Gowda and Amulya in the lead roles whilst Anant Nag and Achyuth Kumar feature in supporting roles. The plot revolves around the families of the two friends who, intending to convert their friendship into a relationship, are elated when their children fall in love with each other and eventually marry upon encountering certain familial disputes.

Produced under the banner Thoogudeepa Productions, music for the film was scored by V. Harikrishna, who also composed the soundtrack. Cinematography was done by K. S. Chandrashekar and was edited by K. M. Prakash. Filming began in April 2015 and was completed in December, before releasing theatrically on 8 January 2016. It received positive reviews from critics who acclaimed the film's screenplay, and the acting performances of Nag and Kumar.

== Cast ==
- Amulya as Khushi
- Suraj Gowda as Suraj
- Ananth Nag as Krishne Gowda
- Achyuth Kumar as Chandrashekhar Patil
- Master Om
- Sharath Lohitashwa
- Chikkanna
- Bullet Prakash
- Mandeep Roy
- Shobaraj
- Chitra Shenoy
- Sangeetha
- Chikkanna
- Sundar
- Shalini
- Swathi
- Yogish Raj
- Keerthana TN

== Production ==
=== Development ===
In February 2015, it was announced that lyricist Kaviraj would direct a film for Thoogudeepa Productions, a production house run by brothers Dinakar Thoogudeepa and Darshan. Kaviraj also conceived the film's story based on an incident from his family. Speaking to The New Indian Express, he said, "It was a humourous [sic] incident and I just weaved [sic] a love story around it. The incident per se is the USP of the film. While there were many stories that used to come to my mind which initially would make me feel that it had the potential of becoming a blockbuster, I would end up finding too many loopholes in it soon. But it was different in the case with Maduveya... The story grew at every stage".

=== Casting ===
The Times of India reported of Amulya's signing on 1 March 2015, and speaking of her role, she said, "I've signed this film especially because my character is very different from the ones that I've essayed until now. I will be playing a college girl, who is more of a tomboy." An audition for the male lead was conducted by the makers in Bangalore between 1–2 March, and following a total of three rounds, shortlisting over a hundred from over a thousand entrants, Suraj Gowda, who had in 2014 filmed with Kahi, was selected. Kaviraj revealed that Anant Nag, Achyuth Kumar would appear in supporting roles.

=== Filming ===
The film was officially launched on 9 May 2015 on the sets of the television show Majaa Talkies aired on Colors Kannada. The launch saw the presence of lead actors, director, producer and music director. Filming however, began on 29 April, and completed 50% of the filming after 20 days. The second schedule was completed in Chikmagalur beginning July. Filming for a song "Hudugi", was done in Bangalore, before the team left for Malaysia to complete two filming for two more song sequences. The film was shot in DTS. Having initially planned to complete filming in a total of 60 days, it was wrapped up after 48 days.

== Soundtrack ==
Maduveya Mamatheya Kareyole

Soundtrack album by V. Harikrishna
- Released: 29 November 2015
- Recorded: November 2015
- Genre: Feature film soundtrack
- Length: 16:41
- Label: D Beats
- Producer: V. Harikrishna

The film's score and soundtrack were composed by V. Harikrishna, also producing the soundtrack album under his label D Beats. Kaviraj penned lyrics for the soundtrack. The album consists of four tracks. It was released at the sets of the reality television show, Bigg Boss Kannada, in November 2015.

Track listing
No.	Title	Lyrics	Singer(s)	Length
1.	"Hudugi"	Kaviraj	Shashank Sheshagiri	3:55
2.	"Bhoomi Bhanu"	Kaviraj	Santhosh Venky	4:07
3.	"Bangaaru"	Kaviraj	Vijay Prakash, Indu Nagaraj	4:17
4.	"Marana Dandane"	Kaviraj	Sonu Nigam, Shreya Ghoshal	4:22
Total length:				16:41

== Release and reception ==
Maduveya Mamatheya Kareyole was released on 8 January 2016 in over 150 theatres across Karnataka. It was distributed under the banner of Thoogudeepa Distributors by Meena Thoogudeepa Srinivas. Upon theatrical release, the film received generally positive reviews from film critics. Alongside the screenplay, the performances of Anant Nag and Achyuth Kumar won unanimous praise.

Reviewing the film for The New Indian Express, A. Sharadhaa said the film had "nuances of love, family bonding, misunderstanding and a balanced sprinkling of music, drama, and crisp narrative". She further added, "It is evident that simplicity has been handled elegantly, which is the film’s strength. It also maintains excellent production qualities. The first time director’s screenplay is straightforward, allowing everyone to become enamoured by the characters." Archana Nathan of The Hindu compared the plot of the film to a 1999 Malayalam film, Niram, and wrote, "Interestingly, despite its unoriginal plot line, Kaviraj’s film makes for an entertaining watch. And the credit for this goes to the cast, especially the combination of Ananth Nag and Achyuth Kumar and their characterisation." Shyam Prasad S. of Bangalore Mirror commended the comic scenes in the films and of the acting performances of Nag and Kumar, he wrote, "Anant Nag and Achyuth are beyond compare. Their presence and acting is very life-like..." He concluded writing, "High standards of production keep the film colourful and glossy throughout. The attention to detail makes up for the grandeur of cinematic commercialism."

The reviewer for Deccan Chronicle rated the film 3.5/5, called it a "simplest story with an effective narration" and wrote of the acting performances, "Ananth Nag, Achyuth Kumar and Amulya with her bullet riding avatar are the entertaining pillars in terms of performances, but for the debut hero Suraj, he definitely needs to learn from the scratch, be it acting, expression or even dancing". Sunayana Suresh of The Times of India rated the film 3.5 out of 5 as well, and said of Kaviraj's direction in the film that it had the "soulful touch" of directors Basu Chatterjee, Sai Paranjpye and Hrishikesh Mukherjee and a "dash of the youth" from Karan Johar, Sooraj Barjatya and Aditya Chopra. She felt that the film had "rich production values", and concluded writing praises of the acting and the technical departments. S. Viswanath of Deccan Herald rated the film two out of five and wrote, "Though no great shakes, the film follows the formula to ensure that the audiences get their money’s worth." He praised the performances of Nag and Kumar, and felt that the "film’s music score and lyrics [of the soundtrack] of Kaviraj" was a "downer".
