= Ramachandra Raju =

Indian actor

- Born: Ramchandra Raju; 7 July 1980 (age 46); Bangalore, Karnataka, India
- Other name: Garuda Ram
- Occupation: Actor
- Years active: 2018–present

Ramachandra Raju (born 7 July 1978), popularly known as Garuda Ram, is an Indian actor who primarily appears in Tamil, Telugu and Kannada films. He rose to fame for his role as the antagonist Garuda in KGF: Chapter 1.

== Career ==
Prior to acting, Raju worked as Yash's bodyguard. Raju made his film debut K.G.F: Chapter 1 (2018), acting alongside Yash. He played the antagonist Garuda in the film and garnered acclaim for the role. This enabled him to get offers to play negative roles in several other films across the four South Indian languages.

Raju made his Tamil debut playing the antagonist in Sulthan (2021) and has acted in villain roles in Kodiyil Oruvan (2021) and Yaanai (2022).

Raju made his Telugu debut with Maha Samudram (2021) and his Malayalam debut with Aaraattu (2022).

== Filmography ==
Key
| † | Denotes films that have not yet been released |

List of film credits
| Year | Title | Role(s) | Language(s) | Notes | Ref. |
|---|---|---|---|---|---|
| 2018 | KGF: Chapter 1 | Garuda | Kannada | | |
| 2021 | Sulthan | Jayaseelan | Tamil | | |
| 2021 | Kodiyil Oruvan | Pedha Perumal | Tamil | | |
| 2021 | Maha Samudram | Dhananjay | Telugu | | |
| 2021 | Madhagaja | Tandava | Kannada | | |
| 2021 | Rider | JD | Kannada | | |
| 2022 | Aaraattu | Badai Raju | Malayalam | | |
| 2022 | Bheemla Nayak | Prisoner | Telugu | Cameo in title song | |
| 2022 | KGF: Chapter 2 | Garuda | Kannada | Archival footage | |
| 2022 | Bhala Thandanana | Anand Bali | Telugu | | |
| 2022 | Yaanai | Lingam, Pandi | Tamil | Dual role | |
| 2023 | Red Sandalwood | Harimaran | Tamil | | |
| 2023 | Salaar: Part 1 – Ceasefire | Rudra Raja Manaar | Telugu | | |
| 2024 | Aranmanai 4 | Kailash Swamiji | Tamil | | |
| 2024 | Hit List | Kaali | Tamil | | |
| 2024 | Bagheera | Rana | Kannada | | |
| 2024 | Zebra | Chief Minister | Telugu | Special appearance | |
| 2025 | Badava | Valava | Tamil | | |
| 2025 | Vidyapati | Jaggu | Kannada | | |
| 2025 | Padai Thalaivan | Thilagan | Tamil | | |
| 2025 | Bakasura Restaurant | Wizard | Telugu | | |
| 2025 | Dude | Gajanna | Tamil | Cameo appearance | |
| 2025 | Vrusshabha | Guna | Telugu | Partially reshot in Malayalam | |
| 2026 | Sattendru Maarudhu Vaanilai | Chakravarthy | Tamil | | |
| 2026 | Nagabandham: The Secret Treasure | Bhairagi | Telugu | | |
| 2026 | Mookuthi Amman 2 | Bhadhra (evil priest) | Tamil | | |

== Awards and nominations ==
| Year | Award | Category | Film | Result | Ref. |
|---|---|---|---|---|---|
| 2019 | Zee Kannada | Best Villain | K.G.F: Chapter 1 | Won | |
| 2019 | 8th SIIMA Awards | Best Actor in a Negative Role | K.G.F: Chapter 1 | Nominated | |
| 2022 | 10th SIIMA Awards | Best Actor in a Negative Role | Madhagaja | Nominated | |
