= Bhala Thandanana =

2022 Indian film

- Theatrical release poster
- Directed by: Chaitanya Dantuluri
- Written by: Srikanth Vissa
- Produced by: Rajani Korrapati
- Starring: Sree Vishnu; Catherine Tresa; Ramachandra Raju
- Cinematography: Suresh Ragutu
- Edited by: Marthand K. Venkatesh
- Music by: Mani Sharma
- Production company: Vaaraahi Chalana Chitram
- Release date: 6 May 2022
- Country: India
- Language: Telugu

Bhala Thandanana is a 2022 Indian Telugu-language action-thriller film directed by Chaitanya Dantluri and written by Srikanth Vissa. The film is produced by Rajani Korrapati under the banner Vaaraahi Chalana Chitram. The film stars Sree Vishnu, Catherine Tresa, and Ramachandra Raju in lead roles. The music is composed by Mani Sharma with cinematography by Suresh Ragutu and editing by Marthand K. Venkatesh. The film released on 6 May 2022.

== Plot ==
Chandu (Sree Vishnu) works as an accountant in an orphanage where he meets investigative journalist Sasirekha (Catherine Tresa), who is trying to crack a series of cold-blooded murders of people who work for Anand Bali (Ramachandra Raju).

== Cast ==
- Sree Vishnu as Chandra "Chandu" Shekar
- Catherine Tresa as Sasirekha "Sasi", investigative journalist
- Ramachandra Raju as Anand Bali
- Posani Krishna Murali as Dayamayam
- Ravi Varma as Bhadra
- Srikanth Iyengar as Sasi's brother-in-law
- Srinivasa Reddy as Murthy
- Aadarsh Balakrishna as Shafi
- Ayyappa P. Sharma as Chakri
- Satya as Balu
- Chaitanya Krishna as Ghani
- Bhupal Raju as Yadav

== Production ==
The film was launched with a pooja ceremony on 16 February 2021 in Hyderabad. S. S. Rajamouli and Rama Rajamouli also attended the ceremony.

== Music ==
Bhala Thandanana

Soundtrack album by Mani Sharma
- Released: 2022
- Recorded: 2021–2022
- Studio: Mahati Recording Studio, Hyderabad
- Genre: Feature film soundtrack
- Length: 9:27
- Language: Telugu
- Label: Mango Music
- Producer: Mani Sharma

The film soundtrack and score is composed by Mani Sharma.

Track-List
No.	Title	Lyrics	Singer(s)	Length
1.	"Meenaacchee"	Tripuraneni Kalyanachakravarthy	Dhanunjay Seepana	04:36
2.	"Raasaanilaa"	Shreemani	Anurag Kulkarni, Ramya Behara	04:51
Total length:				9:27

== Release ==
The film was first scheduled to release on April 30, 2022 but was finally released on 6 May 2022. The film premiered on Disney+ Hotstar on 20 May 2022.

== Reception ==
The film received mixed reviews.

Thadhagath Pathi of The Times of India gave the film a rating of 2.5/5 and wrote "Bhala Thandanana is flawed but it doesn't leave you completely disappointed either because the performances lend some heft to this tepid film".
