= Attarintlo Akka Chellelu =

Telugu drama series

- Genre: Soap opera
- Directed by: Ravindar Reddy
- Starring: See below
- Country of origin: India
- Original language: Telugu
- No. of episodes: 609

Production
- Producer: Seethakanth
- Camera setup: Multi-camera
- Running time: 22 minutes

Original release
- Network: Zee Telugu
- Release: 25 March 2019 – 29 May 2021

Related
- Rettai Roja

Attarintlo Akka Chellellu is an Indian Telugu language soap opera that aired on Zee Telugu. It starred Chaitra Rai in a dual role with Madhubabu and Akarsh. On 2021, Chaitra Rai's Dharani and Sravani roles was replaced by Bhoomi Shetty and Navya Rao respectively. The series premiered on 25 March 2019 and concluded on 29 May 2021. It was remade in Tamil as Rettai Roja on Zee Tamil.

== Plot ==
It revolving around twin sisters Sravani and Dharani. Sravani hates Dharani and dreams to be the queen of her world, while Dharani strives to protect her family from evil.

== Cast ==
- Chaitra Rai (2019–2020) in a dual role as Sravani and Dharani (Twin sisters)
  - Bhoomi Shetty replaced Chaitra Rai in the role of Dharani (2021)
  - Navya Rao replaced Chaitra Rai in the role of Sravani as face transplantation
- Madhubabu in a dual role as Vikram and Surya Pratap Varma
- Akarsh byramudi as Aditya aka Nani

== Remake ==
Now, this series concept is in the Tamil language as Rettai Roja, which airing on Zee Tamil. But, the circumstances of death by Sravani in Zee Telugu's "Attarintlo Akka Chellellu" and by Anuradha in "Rettai Roja" were different. In "Attarintlo Akka Chellellu" Sravani meets her end in a car accident, wherein her car flies off a cliff, while in Zee Tamil's "Rettai Roja" Anuradha got murdered by Sreeja and Chinthamani. Sreeja stabbed Anuradha with knife.
