= Siliconn City =

- Directed by: Murali Gurappa
- Story by: Ananthakrishnan
- Produced by: Manjula Somashekar; Ravi M
- Starring: Srinagar Kitty; Anil Siddhu; Suraj Gowda; Kavya Shetty; Ekta Rathod
- Cinematography: Srinivas
- Edited by: Srikanth
- Music by: Chinna. S
- Distributed by: Vijay Films
- Release date: 16 June 2017
- Language: Kannada

Siliconn City is a 2017 Indian Kannada-language action crime film directed by Murali Gurappa in his directorial debut. It stars Srinagar Kitty, Anil Siddhu, Suraj Gowda, Kavya Shetty, Ekta Rathod, Ashok and Tulasi. The film is a remake of Tamil film Metro (2016).

Siliconn City was released on 16 June 2017 where it received positive reviews from critics.

== Plot ==
Sanjay and his friend Ravish lock up and torture an unknown man in front of a camera filming the whole incident.

Past: Sanjay is a writer for a press and the eldest son of a retired police head constable and his wife. He has a brother named Karthik, who is a first-year engineering student. Sanjay's middle-class family life is happy with his friend Ravish mingling as one of the family. The problem arises when Karthik, who is pressured by his girlfriend Shobha to purchase a bike, persuades his family to get him a bike. Though hesitant at first, they agree to get him a bike of his choice. However, a delay in getting his bike and seeing his classmate James spending casually makes him curious to know what he does for money. James introduces Mathi to the heinous crime of chain snatching and also introduces Mani, who is heading a gang of young college-going chain snatchers. Karthik joins the gang and starts to earn through chain snatching and get all the things he wants.

Karthik decides to do these crimes alone without providing any commission to Mani. Though hesitant at first, the others join him when two of the boys get caught by police and Mani does not come to their aid. Karthik goes back to his house to get a chain recently snatched by him only to find his mother with the chain and all the other gadgets he owns without his parents's knowledge. An argument begins, and Karthik pushes his mother to death. When Sanjay and his father arrive home to realize their mother's death, Sanjay vows to avenge the loss even and Ravish also joins him. During a police investigation, Sanjay and Ravish track down a house breaker and nab him to an unknown location

Present: Sanjay calls the police to hand over the house breaker and runs away with the bag. He takes the bag with 23 kg of stolen gold chains to a black market buyer. At that place, he finds his mother's chain, which leads him to the chain snatchers. Sanjay leaves the place, not before killing all the men in there.

Meanwhile, Karthik injects Mani with a drug that makes him insane and loses his senses. Sanjay goes to Mani's place and finds out the next plan of the snatchers. He leaves with Ravish to the place, and a fight ensues where Sanjay and Ravish manage to kill 3–4 men. Unknown that the 2 men are his brother and friend, Karthik removes his helmet and reveals himself. Shocked in despair, Sanjay and Ravish also reveal themselves, which surprises Karthik. When Karthik pleads with Sanjay to spare him, Sanjay ignores and kills him. The next day, Sanjay and Ravish reveal the truth to Sanjay's father and surrenders to the police.

== Cast ==
- Srinagar Kitty as Sanjay
- Kavya Shetty as Prerana
- Suraj Gowda as Karthik
- Ekta Rathod as Shobha
- Anil Siddhu as Mani
- Chikkanna as Ravish
- Giri as James
- Ashok as Sanjay and Karthik's friend
- Thulasi Shivamani as Sanjay and Karthik's mother
- Nagendra Shah as Sanjay's boss
- Ramesh Pandit as a police inspector

== Soundtrack ==
Siliconn City

Soundtrack album by Anoop Seelin
- Released: March 2017
- Recorded: 2017
- Genre: Feature film soundtrack

Anoop Seelin has composed the music for the soundtrack of the film.

No.	Title	Lyrics	Performer(s)	Length
1.	"Bhetiyada Ee Ghalige"	Arasu Anthare	Siddharth Belmannu, Supriya Lohith
2.	"Mane Eega Mantralaya"	Arasu Anthare	Madhu Balakrishnan
3.	"Hogi Baruveya"	Arasu Anthare	Madhu Balakrishnan
4.	"Bhoomi"	Mamatha Jaganmohan	Anoop Seelin
5.	"Naanu Yaaru"	Arasu Anthare	Runa Rizvi
