= Roberrt =

2021 film by Tharun Sudhir

- Theatrical release poster
- Directed by: Tharun Sudhir
- Written by: Tharun Sudhir
- Produced by: Umapathy Srinivasa Gowda
- Starring: Darshan; Jagapathi Babu; Vinod Prabhakar; Asha Bhat; Ravi Kishan; P. Ravi Shankar
- Cinematography: Sudhakar S. Raj
- Edited by: K. M. Prakash
- Music by: Songs: Arjun Janya; Score: V. Harikrishna
- Production company: Umapathy Films
- Distributed by: Umapathy Films
- Release date: 11 March 2021
- Running time: 166 minutes
- Country: India
- Language: Kannada
- Box office: est.₹55–78 crore (Note: 3 years after the theatrical run, the producer claimed the gross to be around ₹55 crore only and admitted to have inflated the figures earlier. The trade had estimated ₹78.36 crore at the time of its release which the producer admitted to have been fabricated. The trade re-estimated the figures to be ₹55 crore in 2026.)

Roberrt is a 2021 Indian Kannada-language action thriller film written and directed by Tharun Sudhir and produced by Umapathy. It stars Darshan, alongside Asha Bhat (in her Kannada debut), Vinod Prabhakar, Jagapathi Babu, Ravi Kishan and P. Ravi Shankar. The film's soundtrack and musical score was composed by Arjun Janya and V. Harikrishna, while cinematography and editing were handled by Sudhakar S. Raj and K. M. Prakash

Roberrt was theatrically released on 11 March 2021 and received mixed-to-positive reviews from critics. The film went on to become the highest-grossing Kannada film of 2021.

== Plot ==
Raghava lives in Lucknow with his son Arjun and is the head cook in a Brahmin caterer where he helps his caterer's daughter Amrutha in a catering job, who soon falls for him for his honesty. Meanwhile, Balaram Tripathi, an ex-minister vows vengeance on Raghava: Balaram had planned an assassination attempt on ministerial candidate Omkar Shukla after he was humiliated in a wrestling betting, but was saved by Raghava. Tripathi had arranged his son Kishan's marriage with the Central minister's daughter for political gain but was ruined by Raghava and Arjun.

Tripathi kidnaps Raghava and tells his henchman to finish him off and Arjun (who was asleep in his home), who is held at gunpoint, but Raghava violently finishes all of them and Tripathi. Kishan seeks the help of a crime boss named Sarkar to kill Raghava and dispatches men to finish him. Raghava kills them without anyone's knowledge, where Sarkar is astonished to see Raghava and reveals that Raghava is Roberrt and Arjun is not his son. When confronted by Amrutha, Raghava/Roberrt reveals his past.

Past: Roberrt and Raghava are friends/brothers, who works for Sarkar's elder brother Nanabhai in Mangalore. Sarkar and Nanabhai were separated from each other due to jealousy. Later, Roberrt helps Raghava and Thanu express their love for each other to their parents, who declines, but later accepts their relationship. They get married and also bear a son named Arjun. Meanwhile, Roberrt and Raghava discovers Nana's son Cherry indulging in human trafficking and they kill him despite Nana's requests. While celebrating Arjun's birthday, Nana's gang are attacked by unknown forces and Thanu gets killed in the crossfire. Depressed about Thanu's death and worried about Arjun's future, Raghava becomes approver to the cops by divulging Nana's crimes to police commissioner Sathyadev.

Raghava finds that Nana has planned to kill him in an encounter and arrives at Roberrt's den where he believes Roberrt to be involved in Nana's plan, the two indulge in a fight. However, Nana arrives along with Sarkar and shoots Raghava and knocks Roberrt. Nana and Sarkar reveals that it was all their plan and also divulges that Nana is the main mastermind behind the human traffickling and Cherry was following his orders. Nana kills Thanu's parents and throws a dead Raghava, Roberrt and an infant Arjun into a ship container where they drown it in the sea. Roberrt and Arjun survive and escapes from the drowned container. Before dying, Roberrt promises Raghava that he will raise Arjun in a non-violent manner.

Present: Roberrt/Raghava requests Amrutha to keep his past as a secret from Arjun. Nana learns about Roberrt/Raghava's existence from Sarkar, where he arrives in Lucknow and traps Amrutha's father Vishwanath Bhat in a food poisoning case. Nana also frames Roberrt/Raghava in Tripathi's death, where he calls Roberrt/Raghava and divulges that they kidnapped Arjun and tells him to finish the matter once and for all. Roberrt/Raghava arrives and secretly finishes Nana, Kishan, and Sarkar in Rama Navami event.

== Cast ==
- Darshan as Roberrt / Raghava (Fake)
- Jagapathi Babu as Nanabhai
- Asha Bhat as Amrutha, Roberrt's love interest
- Vinod Prabhakar as Raghava (Original)
- P. Ravi Shankar as Sarkar (Nanabhai's brother)
- Sonal Monteiro as Tanu, Raghava's wife
- Ravi Kishan as Balram Tripathi, a legislator
- Devaraj as Sathyadev, former police commissioner
- Avinash as Minister Omkar Shukla
- Chikkanna as Agni
- Shivaraj KR Pete as Babu / Bobby
- Jason D'Souza as Arjun "Laddu"
- Tejaswini Prakash as bride
- Aishwarya Prasad as Kamala
- Chandu B. Gowda as Kishan Tripathi
- Dileep Shetty as Cherry, Nanabhai's son
- Ashok as Vishwanath Bhat (catering owner)
- Naveen D. Padil as Vishwanath Bhat's brother-in-law
- Suchendra Prasad as Tanu's father
- Dhramanna Kadur as Madana
- Giri Dwarakish as Bhootayya
- Sridhar Rao as Lallan Bhai
- Kari Subbu
- Umapathy Srinivasa Gowda in a special appearance in song "Jai Sriram"
- Tharun Sudhir in a special appearance in the song "Dostha Kano"

== Production ==
Production of the film began with the working title D53. Producers of Hebbuli and Ondalla Eradalla, Umapathy Films, announced that they would collaborate with Darshan under the direction of Tharun Kishore Sudhir, in whose debut movie Chowka (2017), Darshan had made a special appearance as Robert. Principal photography began in June 2019. The first theme poster was released by the production house on 6 November 2018, while the title of the movie was announced as "Roberrt" on 25 December 2018 on Christmas. The second theme poster of the movie was released on 5 June 2019 on the eve of Ramzan festival.

Coinciding with the announcement of the title, a theme poster was also released on 25 December 2018. The poster saw Darshan as the incarnation of Hanuman with Rama on his shoulder. Mehreen Pirzada was initially selected as the heroine of the movie but opted out due to dates issue. The shooting of the movie had been undergoing confidentially with mobile phones reportedly banned at the shoot locations. Director Tharun Sudhir had revealed that Darshan would be portraying two different shades in the movie.

== Soundtrack ==
Roberrt

Soundtrack album by Arjun Janya
- Released: 2021
- Recorded: 2019–2020
- Genre: Feature film soundtrack
- Length: 21:53
- Language: Kannada
- Label: Anand Audio
- Producer: Arjun Janya

Arjun Janya chronology
Odeya (2019)	Roberrt (2021)	Kotigobba 3 (2021)

The film's songs are composed by Arjun Janya. This marks the fourth collaboration of Arjun Janya and Darshan after Chakravarthy, Tarak and Odeya. The rerecording of the movie is by V. Harikrishna.

Kannada

- Roberrt's first song, "Ba Ba Ba Na Ready," was released on 3 March 2020.
- The makers released "Jai Sri Ram" from the movie. The song has two versions, out of which one version has been sung by Shankar Mahadevan, and another was sung by Chorus ft. Divya Kumar.
- The third song, "Dostha Kano," was released on 21 March 2020.
- "Kannu Hodiyaka" was released on 20 February 2021.
- "Baby Dance Floor Ready" was released on 28 February 2021.

No.	Title	Lyrics	Singer(s)	Length
1.	"Ba Ba Ba Na Ready"	V. Nagendra Prasad	Vyasaraj Sosale, Santhosh Venky, Aniruddha Sastry, Supreeth Phalguna, Nikhil Parthasarathy	3:15
2.	"Jai Sriram"	V. Nagendra Prasad	Shankar Mahadevan, Manoj Sharma	3:43
3.	"Jai Sriram"	V. Nagendra Prasad	Chorus ft. Divya Kumar	3:38
4.	"Dostha Kano"	Chethan Kumar	Hemanth Kumar, Vijay Prakash	4:04
5.	"Kannu Hodiyaka"	Yogaraj Bhat	Shreya Ghoshal	3:45
6.	"Baby Dance Floor Ready"	Chethan Kumar	Nakash Aziz, Aishwarya Rangarajan	3:33
7.	"Nin Edurali Naanu"	A. P. Arjun	Shruthi Prahalad	1:36
8.	"Roberrt Theme"		Instrumental	0:56
9.	"Roberrt Theme 2"		Instrumental	0:56
10.	"Roberrt Theme 3"		Instrumental	1:06
11.	"Roberrt Theme 4"		Instrumental	2:05

Telugu

No.	Title	Lyrics	Singer(s)	Length
1.	"Ra Ra Ra Nen Ready"	Bhaskarabhatla	Sai Charan Bhaskaruni, Saketh, Aditya Iyenger, Srinath	3:15
2.	"Jai Sriram"	Sri Mani	Swarag Keerthan	3:38
3.	"Kanne Adhirindhi"	Kasarla Shyam	Mangli	3:45
4.	"Baby Dance Floor Ready"	Kasarla Shyam	Nakash Aziz, Aishwarya Rangarajan	3:34
5.	"Brother From Another Mother"	Sri Mani	Vedala Hemachandra, Sri Krishna	4:04
6.	"Ninodhalaka Neenu"	Sri Mani	Ramya Behara	1:36

== Release ==
Roberrt was released on 11 March 2021 along with Telugu dubbed version by the same name, on an eve of Shivaratri Festival in 1200 theatres worldwide. It was originally scheduled for a release in April 2020, The film was delayed for several months due to the COVID-19 pandemic in India. The film was released on about 1600 screens, including 650 in Karnataka and about 350 in Telangana and Andhra Pradesh, 300 in rest of India and 300 in overseas. It was also dubbed in Hindi under the same title by RKD Studios.

=== Home media ===
The digital rights of the film was bagged by Amazon Prime Video. It was released for streaming on Amazon Prime Video on 25 April, in five languages - Kannada, Telugu, Tamil, Malayalam and Hindi. The satellite rights of the Kannada and Hindi versions of the film, were taken by Udaya TV and Colors Cineplex. For the first time ever, the Kannada version was telecasted on 4 November, at 6:30 P.M.

== Reception ==
=== Critical reception ===
Sunayana Suresh, in her review for The Times of India rated 4/5 and stated, "Darshan and Tharun Kishore Sudhir teaming up for the first time together for a full fledged film. The film, which releases almost a year after its original release date, manages to live up to that and ends up being more than just a mass action entertainer and has enough to cater to the family audience too."

Y Maheswara Reddy of Bangalore Mirror rated 4/5 and stated, "Roberrt bilingual (Kannada and Telugu) movie has all the ingredients required to entertain mass audiences, especially the hard-core fans of Challenging Star Darshan. Though this movie was scheduled to be released in April 2020, it got postponed due to the pandemic. However, it has succeeded in meeting the expectation of movie buffs." A Sharadhaa of The New Indian Express rated 4/5 and stated, "Darshan-starrer 'Roberrt' is anything but a typical action fare from the Challenging Star. The actor, who is known for his mass appeal, also delivers an all-round performance that establishes his class credentials too."

== Box office ==
Roberrt on the first day of its release collected 17.24 crore in Karnataka. The film collected 3.12 crore in Telangana and Andhra Pradesh on its first day . The movie was reported to have collected Rs. 78.36 crore in a week. The movie completed 25 days at theatres until they were shut due to the second wave of COVID-19. Amidst reports of discrepancies in the official figures announced which the producer agreed to three years later - calling the earlier figures were inflated numbers and fabricated. Though the movie was claimed to have been a box office success, it was reported to have caused substantial loss. The producer alleged that he had to reject a profitable offer given by a prominent OTT platform during COVID-19 pandemic, purportedly on the insistence of the lead actor resulting in a loss of ₹13 crores. Sakshi reported the Telugu version had caused a loss of ₹1.55 crores. The producer also revealed that the movie had not grossed ₹100 crores and revealed the total business done by the movie was ₹55 crores only.

== Awards and nominations ==
Award	Category	Recipient	Result	Ref.
10th South Indian International Movie Awards
10th South Indian International Movie Awards	Best Film	Umapathy Gowda	Nominated	
10th South Indian International Movie Awards	Best Director	Tharun Sudhir	Won	
10th South Indian International Movie Awards	Best Cinematographer	Sudhakar Raj	Won	
10th South Indian International Movie Awards	Best Actor	Darshan	Nominated	
10th South Indian International Movie Awards	Best Actress in a Supporting Role	Sonal monteiro	Nominated	
10th South Indian International Movie Awards	Best Debut Actress	Asha Bhat	Nominated	
10th South Indian International Movie Awards	Best Music Director	Arjun Janya	Won	
10th South Indian International Movie Awards	Best Lyricist	Yogaraj Bhat ("Kannu Hodiyaka")	Nominated	
10th South Indian International Movie Awards	Best Male Playback Singer	Shankar Mahadevan ("Jai Sriram")	Nominated	
10th South Indian International Movie Awards	Best Female Playback Singer	Shreya Ghoshal ("Kannu Hodiyaka")	Nominated	
67th Filmfare Awards South
67th Filmfare Awards South	Best Actor	Darshan	Nominated	
67th Filmfare Awards South	Best Actress	Asha Bhat	Nominated	
67th Filmfare Awards South	Best Music Director	Arjun Janya and V. Harikrishna	Nominated	
67th Filmfare Awards South	Best Playback Singer – Female	Shreya Ghoshal ("Kannu Hodiyaka")	Nominated	
