= Kendada Seragu =

- Directed by: Rocky Somli
- Written by: Rocky Somli
- Based on: Kendada Seragu by Rocky Somli
- Produced by: K. Kotresh Gowda
- Starring: Malashri; Bhoomi Shetty
- Cinematography: Vipin V Raj
- Edited by: Srikanth
- Music by: Veeresh Kamble
- Production companies: Sri Muttu Talkies; S. K. Productions
- Release date: 17 April 2026
- Country: India
- Language: Kannada

Kendada Seragu is a 2026 Indian Kannada language film directed by Rocky Somli. The film stars Bhoomi Shetty and Malashri in the lead roles.

== Cast ==
- Bhoomi Shetty as the younger Pavitra
- Malashri as the older Pavitra
- Shobhita M as Nethra
- Mohan Kumar
- Pratima Thakur as Amulya
- Vardhan
- Harish Arasu as Sameer
- Yash Shetty
- Sindhu Loknath
- Bala Rajwadi
- Umesh Kumar
- Meena
- Devu Rathavara
- Thirumalesh Raj
- Venkatesh Mandya
- Pooja
- Mamatha
- Manju
- Satish Kabaddi

== Production ==
The film was in production since 2023. This is the first time that Malashri has dubbed for herself for more than a decade. The Great Khali was initially approached to play a wrestler in the film.

== Reception ==
A. Sharadhaa of the Cinema Express said that "Kendada Seragu stays with you for what it chooses to look at. There is no loud resolution here, just women finding ways to stand even when the ground keeps shifting." Susmita Sameera of The Times of India said that "Kendada Seragu is a hard-hitting film that presents painful realities while ending on a hopeful note, reminding viewers that even in the darkest situations, there is still a chance for change." Y. Maheswara Reddy of the Bangalore Mirror said that "The film could have been better. It is worth watching for audiences who want to encourage new talent."
