= Salaga (film) =

2021 Indian Kannada-language action thriller film

- Theatrical release poster
- Directed by: Duniya Vijay
- Written by: Duniya Vijay; Maasthi Upparahalli
- Produced by: KP Srikanth
- Starring: Duniya Vijay; Sanjana Anand; Dhananjay
- Cinematography: Shiva Sena
- Edited by: Deepu S. Kumar
- Music by: Charan Raj
- Production company: Venus Enterrtainer
- Release date: 14 October 2021 (India)
- Country: India
- Language: Kannada
- Box office: ₹22−25 crores

Salaga is a 2021 Indian Kannada-language action thriller film directed by Duniya Vijay in his directorial debut and produced by KP Srikanth. It features Duniya Vijay himself along with Sanjana Anand, Daali Dhananjay, and Nagabhushan in prominent roles. The film was released on 14 October 2021.

== Plot ==
In Bangalore, Slum Shetty is a gangster, who along with former gangster-turned BBMP corporator Indra and Juttu Seena are controlling the Bangalore underworld. Shetty learns that a person named Thyagaraja Ramanna is smuggling illegal arms from Mangalore Port for Salaga, who is operating from prison. Shetty sends Suri Anna to deal with him. Learning about Ramanna's attack, Salaga hires a cold-blooded gang named Batsman boys and kills Suri at a bar.

Suri's brother Kenda is enraged and vows to kill Salaga. The trio, along with Kenda, learns that Salaga is released from prison, where they attempt to kill him, but Salaga escapes and kills Kenda, with the help of Batsman boys. Salaga's childhood girlfriend Sanjana pursues Salaga to accept her love proposal, but he refuses where after much insistence, Salaga agrees. After increase in crime rates, The city commissioner appoints ACP Samrat to deal with the underworld.

Salaga tracks Seena at the market, where he along with the Batsman boys kill him. With a person named Savithri's help, Samrat tracks down the Batsman boys and kills them. Due to Seena's death, Shetty gets scared of his gang and family members, where he gets into a road accident and admitted to a hospital. Salaga reaches the hospital and kills him, where he discreetly escapes with Sanjana and surrenders at the court. Samrat interrogates Salaga who reveals his real name as Vijay Kumar and reveals his past.

Past: Vijay Kumar hails from Uttar Karnataka, and he arrives in Bangalore with his headmaster father and mother for his education. Vijay's father learns that their village people are also working as labourers in the city. He teaches their children in the city in order for them to be educated, but is ridiculed by Indra, Shetty, Seena and SI Ashwath, who makes the labourers believe their false statements about doing good for them. One day, Vijay thrashes Naga as he harassed Sanjana's friend Kavya.

Vijay gets arrested by Ashwath in charges of killing Naga, where he tries to prove his innocence to his father and mother, but to no avail. After facing the embarrassment by their people, Vijay's father and mother commits suicide, leaving Vijay devastated. Vijay is sent to a remand home where he learns that Naga was actually killed by Slum Shetty, Seena and Indra upon the request of Ashwath as he suspects Vijay to be Kavya's (Ashwath's daughter) boyfriend and also wants to embarrass Vijay's father. After his release from remand home, Vijay kills Ashwath. He is arrested again and sentenced to prison.

Present: After revealing his past to Samrat, Salaga escapes by shooting himself in his leg and blames Samrat for encounter-killing him. After the enquiry at the court, Salaga is released due to lack of evidence. Salaga tracks down Indra at a temple festival and kills him, thus avenging his parents' death. Salaga surrenders himself and is taken to prison.

== Cast ==
- Duniya Vijay as Vijay Kumar / Salaga
  - Sridhar H Krishna as Young Vijay
- Sanjana Anand as Sanjana
- Dhananjay as ACP Samrat
- B.V.Bhaskar as SI Bhaskar
- Nagabhushana as Vijay's Lawyer
- Achyuth Kumar as Police Commissioner
- Cockroach Sudhi as Savitri
- Sampath Maitreya as Vijay's Father
- Usha Ravishankar as Vijay's Mother
- Yashwanth Shetty as Slum Shetty
- Channakeshava as Juttu Seena
- Neenasam Ashwath as SI Ashwath, Corrupt Officer
- Sathyanarayan Ummatthal as Sathyanna, Constable
- Rockline Sudhakar as Sanjana's Father
- Apoorva as Sanjana's Mother
- Shambhavi Venkatesh as Shetty's Wife
- Dinesh as Suri Anna
- Shreshta as Kenda, Suri's Brother

== Production ==
Filming started in Bangalore in June 2019. In October 2019, it was reported that the film was in its last leg of production.

== Soundtrack ==
Salaga

Soundtrack album by Charan Raj
- Released: 2020
- Recorded: 2019
- Genre: Feature film soundtrack
- Length: 18:28
- Language: Kannada
- Label: A2 Music

Official audio
- Salaga - Full Album on YouTube

The film's background score was composed by Charan Raj, with 1 song composed by Naveen Sajju.

Track listing
No.	Title	Lyrics	Music	Singer(s)	Length
1.	"Suri Anna"	Duniya Vijay & team	Charan Raj	Anthony Daasan	4:20
2.	"I Love You Sanjana"	Chethan Kumar	Naveen Sajju	Naveen Sajju	2:26
3.	"Malaye Malaye"	Nagarjun Sharma	Charan Raj	Sanjith Hegde, Aishwarya Rangarajan	4:06
4.	"Salaga Title Track"	Nagarjun Sharma	Charan Raj	Yogi B, Sharath, Charan Raj, Sanjith Hegde	4:35
5.	"Salaga Promotional song" (Folk song)		Charan Raj	Girija Siddi, Geetha Siddi, Channakesava	3:00
Total length:					18:28

== Box office ==
The film collected ₹15.31 crores on first week and end up grossing over ₹22 crores at Box-office. Pinkvilla reported that the film had collected ₹25 crore (US$2.6 million) in 25 days and became a commercial success at the box office.

== Awards and nominations ==
Award	Category	Recipient	Result	Ref
67th Filmfare Awards South	Best Film	KP Srikanth	Nominated	
67th Filmfare Awards South	Best Director	Duniya Vijay	Won	
67th Filmfare Awards South	Best Supporting Actor	Dhananjay	Nominated	
67th Filmfare Awards South	Best Supporting Actress	Usha Ravishankar	Nominated	
67th Filmfare Awards South	Best Music Director	Charan Raj	Nominated	
67th Filmfare Awards South	Best Lyricist	Nagarjun Sharma - "Malaye Malaye	Nominated	
67th Filmfare Awards South	Best Female Playback Singer	Aishwarya Rangarajan - "Malaye Malaye"	Nominated	
10th South Indian International Movie Awards	Best Film	KP Srikanth	Nominated	
10th South Indian International Movie Awards	Best Supporting Actor	Dhananjay	Nominated	
10th South Indian International Movie Awards	Best Actor in a Negative Role	Yash Shetty	Nominated	
10th South Indian International Movie Awards	Best Debut Director	Duniya Vijay	Nominated	
