= Kotigobba 3 =

2021 Indian film by Shiva Karthik

- Promotional poster
- Directed by: Shiva Karthik
- Written by: Sudeepa; T. Sivakumar; Shiva Karthik
- Produced by: Soorappa Babu
- Starring: Sudeepa; Aftab Shivdasani; Madonna Sebastian; Shree Raam
- Cinematography: Shekhar Chandra
- Edited by: Goran Ivanovic
- Music by: Arjun Janya
- Production company: Rambabu Productions
- Distributed by: Rockline Entertainments
- Release date: 15 October 2021
- Running time: 122 minutes
- Country: India
- Language: Kannada
- Budget: ₹25 crore
- Box office: ₹42.40–45.32 crore

Kotigobba 3 (transl. One in a crore 3) is a 2021 Indian Kannada-language masala film directed by Shiva Karthik and produced by Soorappa Babu under Rambabu Production. The film sequel to Kotigobba 2, stars Sudeepa and P. Ravi Shankar reprising their roles, alongside Aftab Shivdasani, Madonna Sebastian, Nawab Shah, Shraddha Das, Abhirami, Tarak Ponnappa in prominent roles. The music was composed by Arjun Janya, while cinematography and editing were handled by Shekhar Chandra and Goran Ivanovic.

Kotigobba 3 was released in theatres on 15 October 2021 to mixed reviews from critics and became a commercial success at the box office.

== Plot ==
Following the events after the prequel, Satya/Shiva runs an orphanage for the downtrodden people and also steals black money. Jaanu, a nine-year-old girl in his orphanage, suffers from Brugada Syndrome and Satya takes her to Warsaw for treatment. Satya meets Dr. Priya and they become friends with Jaanu's help. Devendra, a pharmaceutical mogul in Warsaw, wants to spread a virus and provide a cure at a high price to obtain profits. Satya consults the doctor and schedules a date for Jaanu's operation. Later, Satya and Jaanu visit the "Aviation Museum" for a visit and return to India. Later, a masked man Ghost carries out heist of the Crown Jewel, which was bought by Devendra and was to be delivered to him in a week. The chase occurs between the cops and Ghost in which Ghost manages to escape.

Meanwhile, Sharath and Kangana are Interpol officers who began their investigation and check the CCTV footage and the photo of the masked man Ghost is a doppelgänger of Satya, and is seen reciting a Sanskrit mantra during the heists and the explosions were in a bid to distract the cops. They head to Bangalore to investigate, where they learn about ex-ACP Kishore and interrogates him. Kishore reveals about Satya's past. Devendra also learns about Satya and assigns his assassin Michael to finish him and bring the Crown Jewel back, but Satya kills Michael. Sharath and Kangana arrests Satya and interrogates him.

Satya fakingly accepts the blame and also lies that Kishore was the person behind the plan. Priya is heartbroken to know about Satya's scams, where she takes Jaanu with her to Poland for treatment. Sharath and his team take Satya and Kishore to Poland, where they are taken to the prison from the airport. However, Ghost helps Satya and Kishore to escape, where he reaches them to the hospital where Jaanu is admitted. Anantha Krishna, a surgeon tries to inject sedative into Satya, but Satya escapes and convinces Priya and Kishore about his innocence.

Satya also reveals Anantha Krishna's involvement in Ghost's criminal activities, where he also shows the doctor's phone which receive a message from Ghost telling him to meet him at the pub. They reach the pub and realize the errors. The Interpol arrives to arrest them, but Ghost distracts them and takes the gang to his hideout, where they meet Anantha Krishna and Ghost. Anantha Krishna reveals that Ghost is Shiva, Satya's twin brother.

Past: Durga, an HDO officer and Satya & Shiva's mother, objects Devendra's methods of spreading a virus and inventing medicines to cure them for profits. Devendra kills Durga, but Satya and Shiva were born before Durga succumbs to her injuries. Satya is born healthy, but Shiva is wounded due to nerve damages as he defended Satya in the womb from Devendra's attack. Satya and Shiva's father Prakash, who was abroad on a business trip, arrives to take them and Anantha Krishna gives Satya, but takes Shiva to an ashram, where he gets cured. Anantha Krishna takes Shiva to Poland for higher studies. Anantha Krishna reveals the incident to Shiva, who decides to avenge their mother's death. Shiva also learn about Satya, where he operates a plan to bring him to Poland to divulge the truth.

Present: Jeet, Devendra's son, kidnaps Jaanu from the hospital. Satya, having tracked Jeet's location through a tracker planted by Shiva, saves Jaanu and kills Jeet by destroying the oxygen tank in the ambulance, causing the ambulance to explode. Shiva/Ghost and Kishore are taken by the Interpol, but they are kidnapped by Devendra's henchmen. Shiva/Ghost reveals himself to Devendra and kills him and his associates, where he frames the murders on Kishore, who gets arrested. Sathya gets released and returns home with Jaanu. Shiva sells the Crown Jewel and uses the money to cure the people, who were affected by Devendra's medicine.

== Cast ==
- Sudeepa in a double role as
  - Satya alias Shiva
  - Shiva alias Ghost
- P. Ravi Shankar as ex-ACP Kishore
- Madonna Sebastian as Dr. Priya, Satya's girlfriend
- Aftab Shivdasani as Sharath, an Interpol officer
- Shraddha Das as Kangana, Sharath's assistant
- Nawab Shah as Devendra, a pharmaceutical mogul
- Tarak Ponnappa as Jeet, Devendra's son
- Abhirami as Durga IAS, HDO officer and Satya & Shiva's mother
- Prakash Raj as Satya and Shiva's father (photo appearance and reference from the prequel)
- Danish Akhtar Saifi as Basheer Bhai
- Doddanna as Commissioner of Police
- Om Prakash Rao as a cop
- Tabla Nani as Priya's guard from Interpol
- Shobaraj as ACP
- Ravishankar Gowda as Sundar Priya's relative
- Ramesh Bhat as Priya's grandfather
- Kavitha as Priya's grandmother
- Rajesh Nataranga as Dr. Anantha Krishna, Durga's brother
- Sangeetha as Durga's sister-in-law
- Baby Aadya as Jaanu
- Rangayana Raghu as Devendra's assistant
- Raj Deepak Shetty as Michael, Devendra's assistant
- Dinesh as Satya's friend
- Shri Mahadev as Satya's friend
- Karthi Soundaram as Ramesh, a journalist

=== Cameo appearance ===
- Shivaraj K R Pete
- Krishna and Pradeep Bogadi (in the song "Akashane Adarisuva")
- Ashika Ranganath as Chameli (in the song "Pataki Poriyo")

== Production ==
The filming began in June 2018 in Belgrade. Sudeepa rejoined the production in March 2019, after finishing his filming commitments for Pailwaan. Madonna Sebastian is selected to play the female lead, thus marking her debut in Kannada cinema. Kotigobba 3 continued to have a start-stop filming schedule due to Sudeepa's other acting commitments like Sye Raa Narasimha Reddy and his injury on the film sets in Hyderabad in August 2019. Parts of the film were shot in Serbia, Malaysia, Thailand and Poland. The filming was completed in January 2020 after which shooting of song sequences was scheduled in Pondicherry, Mumbai and Bangalore.

== Soundtrack ==
The music was composed by Arjun Janya and was released by Anand Audio.

Kotigobba 3

Soundtrack album by Arjun Janya
- Released: 2 October 2021
- Recorded: 2020–2021
- Genre: Feature film soundtrack
- Length: 20:52
- Language: Kannada
- Label: Anand Audio
- Producer: Arjun Janya

Arjun Janya chronology
Roberrt (2021)	Kotigobba 3 (2021)	Bhajarangi 2 (2021)

No.	Title	Lyrics	Singer (s)	Length
1.	"Akashane Adarisuva"	V. Nagendra Prasad	Vyasaraj Sosale	03:06
2.	"Pataki Poriyo"	Anup Bhandari	Vijay Prakash, Anuradha Bhat	03:37
3.	"Nee Kotiyali Obbane"	Yogaraj Bhat	Shreya Ghoshal	03:43
4.	"Kanda Kanda Aalisa Haadu"	V. Nagendra Prasad	K. S. Chithra	03:53

== Marketing ==
The teaser trailer for the film was removed from YouTube in March 2020 due to copyright infringement claim and restored a few days later after Anand Audio filed a return complaint.

== Release ==
The film was scheduled to be released on 30 April 2020, but was postponed due to the COVID-19 pandemic. The film is scheduled to be released in theaters on 14 October 2021, alongside the Telugu version titled Kotikokkadu 3. The film's release was delayed to 15 October 2021 due to a tiff between the producers and financiers.

== Reception ==
=== Critical response ===
Sunayana Suresh of The Times of India gave 4/5 stars and wrote "Kotigobba 3 does not disappoint fans of the masala film genre, with a more classy than ‘massy’ approach." Pratibha Joy of OTTplay gave 3.5/5 stars and wrote "Kotigobba 3 is a Kiccha show all the way and fans will be thrilled that there is a lot of him in this installment." Madiri of Bangalore Mirror gave 3.5/5 stars and wrote "If you are looking to watch a film along with the entire family, Kotigobba 3 will be a good outing for you." Jagadish Angadi of Deccan Herald gave 3/5 stars and wrote "Directed by debutant Shiva Karthik, the multistarrer is a massy entertainer, as the hooting and whistling at the cinema showed. The plot defies logic as it relies heavily on formulaic commercial elements." A. Sharadhaa of The New Indian Express gave 3/5 stars and wrote "Kottigobba 3 is a treat for both the fans of Sudeep and commercial entertainers."

=== Box office ===
The film earned more than ₹12.5 crore (US$1.3 million) on its first day of release. It was estimated to have collected ₹40.5 crore (US$4.3 million) in theatrical run at the box office.

== Awards ==
- 13th Bengaluru International Film Festival :-
  - Kannada Popular Entertainment - Most Popular Cinema 2021 - 3rd Place Won

Award	Category	Recipient(s) and nominee(s)	Result
10th South Indian International Movie Awards	SIIMA Award for Best Male Playback Singer	Vijay Prakash - "Pataki Poriyo"	Nominated
10th South Indian International Movie Awards	SIIMA Award for Best Female Playback Singer	Anuradha Bhat - "Pataki Poriyo"	Nominated
10th South Indian International Movie Awards	SIIMA Award for Best Cinematographer	Shekhar Chandru	Nominated
10th South Indian International Movie Awards	SIIMA Award for Best Comedian – Kannada	P. Ravi Shankar	Nominated

Award	Category	Recipient(s) and nominee(s)	Result
ViKa (Vijaya Karnataka) Web Cinema Awards 2021	Best Actor	Sudeepa	Nominated
ViKa (Vijaya Karnataka) Web Cinema Awards 2021	Best Film	Soorappa Babu	Nominated
ViKa (Vijaya Karnataka) Web Cinema Awards 2021	Best Supporting Actress	Abhirami	Nominated
ViKa (Vijaya Karnataka) Web Cinema Awards 2021	Best Comedy Actor	P. Ravi Shankar	Nominated
