= Asha Bhat =

Indian actress

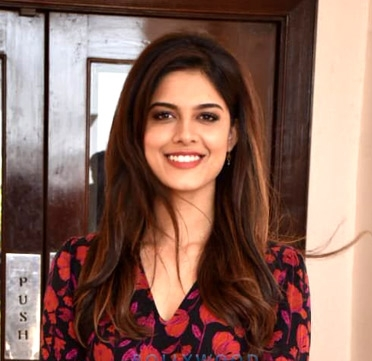
- Bhat in 2019
- Born: 5 September 1992 (age 34); Sirsi, Karnataka, India
- Education: R.V. College of Engineering
- Occupations: Actress, model
- Height: 1.77 m (5 ft 9 1/2 in)
- Beauty pageant titleholder
- Title: Miss Supranational 2014; Miss Diva Supranational 2014
- Years active: 2014–Present
- Hair color: Black
- Eye color: Dark Brown
- Major competitions: Miss Supranational 2014 (Winner) (Best in Talent) (Best National Costume* runner-up) (*designed by Melvyn Noronha); Miss Diva - 2014 (Winner - Miss Diva Supranational 2014) (Miss Congeniality) (Miss Beautiful Smile) (Miss Fascinating)

Asha Bhat (born 5 September 1992) is an Indian actress, model and the winner of the Miss Supranational 2014 pageant. She is the first Indian to win the title. Bhat made her acting debut with the 2019 Hindi film Junglee. She has since appeared in the Kannada action thriller Roberrt (2021) and the Telugu romantic comedy Ori Devuda (2022).

== Early life and education ==
Bhat was born in Bhadravati, an industrial city in the Shimoga district of Indian state of Karnataka on 5 September 1992 to parents Subrahmanya and Shyamala Bhat. Both her parents are medical laboratory technicians and have been serving the Bhadravati city clinical laboratories. She has one elder sister, Dr. Akshatha, who is a Neonatologist and clinician scientist in Hawaii, married to Vivek More (works at U.S army). She is from a Havyaka Brahmin family.

Bhat attended St. Charles School in Bhadravathi and pursued her pre-university education at Alva's Pre-University College in Moodbidri. She enrolled for National Cadet Corps (NCC) while studying at the Alvas College and was selected to participate in the Republic Day Camp. She was a member of NCC delegation from SAARC nations and visited Sri Lanka Military Academy and won all rounder award in the year 2009, awarded by the president of Sri Lanka, Mahinda Rajapaksa. She graduated with a Bachelor's degree in Electronic engineering from R.V. College of Engineering.

== Pageantry ==
In 2014, Bhat participated in Miss Diva pageant organized by The Times Group. She was crowned Miss India Supranational 2014, next to Alankrita Sahai who was crowned Miss India Earth 2014 and Noyonita Lodh, the eventual winner of the contest and was crowned Miss India Universe, at the grand finale of the pageant held on 14 October 2014 at Westin Mumbai Garden City in Mumbai. Bhat also won three special awards at Miss Diva 2014 namely, Miss Congeniality, Miss Beautiful Smile and Miss Fascinating.

Bhat represented India at Miss Supranational 2014 held in Krynica-Zdrój in Poland and was the winner of the pageant held on 5 December 2014. She also won the special award for "Best in Talent" and 2nd runner up for "Best National Costume" at the pageant. Her national costume was designed by internationally acclaimed fashion designer and beauty pageant mentor Melvyn Noronha. She was crowned by the outgoing titleholder Miss Supranational 2013, Mutya Johanna Datul from Philippines.

During her one-year tenure with Miss Supranational she visited Thailand, Myanmar, Hungary, Mauritius, China and numerous countries around Poland and India. In May 2015, she travelled to Thailand and judged the grand finale of Miss Grand Thailand. Along with Miss Supranational 2014 first runner up and the winner of Miss Grand Thailand 2014, Parapadsorn Disdamrong she crowned Tharathip Sukdarunpat as Miss Supranational Thailand at the conclusion of the event held on 12 May 2015 at Indoor Stadium Huamark in Bangkok.

== Career ==
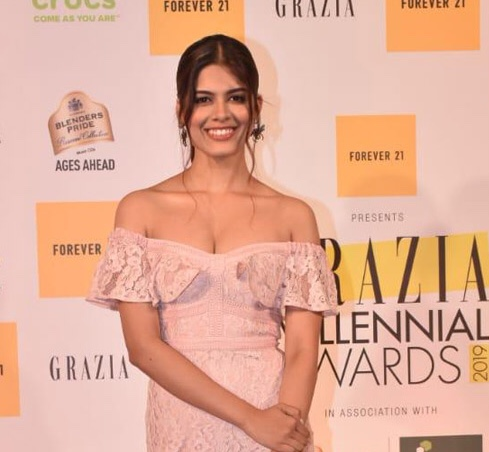
Bhat at an event in 2019

Bhat made her acting debut in 2019 with the Hindi action adventure film Junglee. She played Meera, an animal activist alongside Vidyut Jamwal. Devesh Sharma of Filmfare praised her role for not being an "arm-candy", Priyanka Sinha Jha of News18 noted that despite the screen scape her role doesn't "add value". The film became a box office average.

In 2021, Bhat made her Kannada film debut with Roberrt, playing Amrutha opposite Darshan. A Sharadhaa of The New Indian Express stated that she "shines" in her scenes. The film eventually became the highest-grossing Kannada film of the year.

Bhatt next played Meera, an assistant director opposite Vishwak Sen, in the 2022 fil Ori Devuda, which marked her Telugu debut. The film was a commercial success with Murali Krishna CH of Cinema Express being appreciative of her "expressive eyes".

== Media image ==
In the Bangalore Times' 30 Most Desirable Women list, Bhat was placed 14th in 2019 and 7th in 2020. Apart from her acting career, Bhat is a social activist and runs her own NGO named the Astra Foundation.

== Filmography ==
Key
†	Denotes films that have not yet been released

Year	Film	Role	Language	Notes	Ref.
2019	Junglee	Meera	Hindi	Hindi Debut	
2021	Roberrt	Amrutha "Amu"	Kannada	Kannada Debut	
2022	Ori Devuda	Meera	Telugu	Telugu Debut	

Awards and achievements
Preceded by (Philippines) Mutya Datul	Miss Supranational; 2014	Succeeded by (Paraguay) Stephania Stegman
Preceded by Vijaya Sharma	India's Representative to Miss Supranational; 2014	Succeeded by Aafreen Vaz
Preceded by First Winner	Miss Diva Supranational; 2014	Succeeded by Title was Awarded in Femina Miss India Pageant
