= Puksatte Lifu =

- Official poster
- Directed by: Aravind Kuplikar
- Written by: Aravind Kuplikar; M.S. Ramesh
- Starring: Sanchari Vijay; Matangi Prasan
- Cinematography: Adwait Gurumurthy
- Edited by: Suresh Arumugam
- Music by: Vasu Dixit
- Release date: 24 September 2021
- Country: India
- Language: Kannada

Pukksatte Lifu, Purusotte Ella (transl. Everything in life comes free for you, but still, you are busy) is a 2021 Indian Kannada-language comedy drama film directed by Aravind Kuplikar and starring Sanchari Vijay and Matangi Prasan, both of whom starred in Kahi (2016).

== Cast ==
- Sanchari Vijay as Shahjahan
- Matangi Prasan as Sharada
- Achyuth Kumar as Byregowda
- Aravind Kuplikar as Vinay Mallya
- Rangayana Raghu

== Reception ==
Sunayana Suresh of The Times of India opined that "Puksatte Lifu Pursotte Illa may have a moment or two where the story might meander away, but if one chooses to ignore that this film definitely is a breath of fresh air and proves that content is eventually the king in cinema". A Sharadhaa from The New Indian Express wrote that "Pukksatte Lifu... definitely has a dynamic story to tell, and it is a must-watch film for every person to understand how common people become puppets in the hands of a corrupt system". Bobby Sing of Firstpost wrote that "Puksatte Lifu perfectly pays its respectable farewell to Vijay and so do we as viewers and his staunch fans". Vivek M. V. of Deccan Herald wrote that "'Puksatte Lifu' is filled with colourful characters backed by fine performers".
