= Madhagaja =

2021 South Indian Kannada-language action drama film

- Theatrical release poster
- Directed by: S. Mahesh Kumar
- Produced by: Umapathy Srinivas
- Starring: Sriimurali; Ashika Ranganath; Jagapathi Babu; Devayani
- Narrated by: Vasishta Simha
- Cinematography: I. Naveen Kumar
- Edited by: Harish Komme
- Music by: Ravi Basrur
- Production company: Umapathy Films
- Distributed by: Umapathy Films
- Release date: 3 December 2021
- Running time: 132 Minutes
- Country: India
- Language: Kannada
- Budget: ₹24 crore
- Box office: ₹26—30 Crores (Note: The producer claimed the movie collected ₹30 crores as against trade estimate of ₹25.70 crores)

Madhagaja (lit. "Great Elephant") is a 2021 South Indian Kannada-language action drama film directed by S. Mahesh Kumar and produced by Umapathy Srinivas under the banner of Umapathy Films. The film features Sriimurali, Ashika Ranganath and Jagapathi Babu, and Devayani in the lead roles. The film released in theatres on 3 December 2021. This movie became superhit.

== Plot ==
Surya alias "Madhagaja" is an orphan who makes a living as a real estate agent in Varanasi. Surya also earns some quick buck on the dead people that end up in the Manikarnika Ghat and wants to rule the area, but a litigation case lands him and his friend in Shivagaada, a village in Karnataka, which is bloodshed filled-state ruled by Bhairava Dorai and Rathnamma, who are the landlords of the village. Surya visits Bhairava Dorai's house and becomes their guest.

Meanwhile, Rathnamma (who is suspicious of Surya) learns from Basavanna that Surya is her own son. Fearing that Surya would learn of his true origin and would interfere in the bloodshed, Rathnamma gives the amount money to Surya required for the land. After they leave the village, Basavanna reveals to Surya that Bhairava and Rathnamma are his real parents as Rathnamma had abandoned Surya due to rivalry and bloodshed in the village and had entrusted Basavanna to take care of Surya as he should not grow like Bhairava. Basavanna makes Surya promise to not reveal his identity to them and protect Bhairava's family from all sorts of dangers. Bhairava has a water feud-dispute between another village landlord Veerabhadra.

When Veerabhadra attacks Bhairava and his family at a village festival, Surya interferes in the dispute by thrashing and humiliating Veerabhadra earning Bhairava's trust. Meanwhile, Veerabhadra's son Tandava is released from prison and learns of his father's humiliation. Tandava attacks Surya and Bhairava at the DC's office, but Surya evades the attack and Tandava learns of Surya's identity. Veerabhadra and Tandava decide to end the enmity and send the water to the village by having Tandava and Pallavi (Bhairava's friend's daughter) married, to which they agree.

Bhairava and Rathnamma learns that Pallavi loves Surya, where they ask Surya to leave the village. It is revealed that the wedding was actually a plan by Tandava and Veerabhadra to prevent the digital clock fixing in the river by Bhairava and the villagers and also to send Surya out of the village. Tandava and Veerabhadra kidnaps Basavanna, Bhairava and his family, where Tandava reveals Surya's true origin to Bhairava. Surya arrives in time and rescues them and kills Tandava and Veerabhadra, thus rendering peace and the riverwater is flown in the village.

== Cast ==
- Sriimurali as Surya Madhagaja
- Ashika Ranganath as Pallavi
- Jagapathi Babu as Bhairava Dorai
- Devayani as Rathnamma
- Chikkanna as Surya's friend
- Rangayana Raghu as Basavanna
- Ramachandra Raju as Tandava
- Shivaraj K R Pete as Veeresha
- Dharmanna Kadur as Lawyer
- Anil Kumar as Veerabhadra

== Soundtrack ==
Madhagaja

Soundtrack album by Ravi Basrur
- Released: 2021
- Recorded: 2021
- Genre: Soundtrack
- Length: 17.08
- Language: Kannada
- Label: Anand Audio
- Producer: Bharath Madhusudan

Ravi Basrur chronology
Antim: The Final Truth (2021)	Madhagaja (2021)	Muddy (2021)

No.	Title	Lyrics	Singer(s)	Length
1.	"Geleya Nanna Geleya"	Chetan Kumar	Vaishnavi Kannan	4.43
2.	"Dwaparake Sri Krishna"	Ravi Basrur	Santhosh Venky	4.24
3.	"Madhagaja Title Song"	Kinnal Raj	Santhosh Venky	4.03
4.	"Nagutha Thayi"	Kinnal Raj	Santhosh Venky	3.34
Total length:				17.08

== Production ==
Principal photography wrapped on 26 August 2021.

== Box office ==
The movie grossed ₹7.82 crores on the first day and had collected ₹20.23 crores within 3 days. It collected ₹25.7 crores on first week. It completed 50 days in 11 centers of Karnataka. In 2024, the producer revealed the movie had done a total business of ₹30 crore.
