= Groufie =

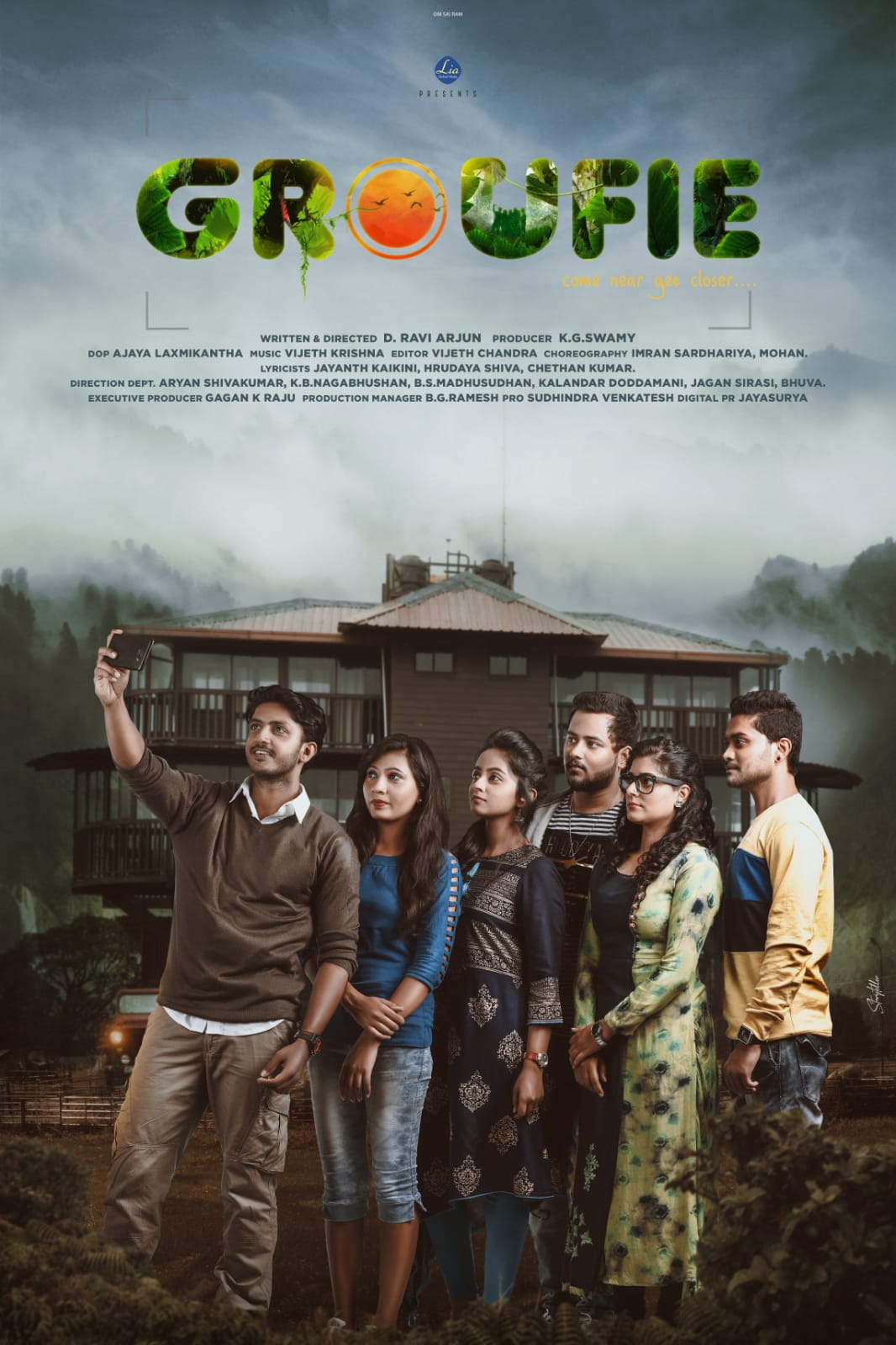
- Film poster
- Directed by: Ravi Arjun D
- Written by: Ravi Arjun D
- Produced by: K G Swamy
- Starring: Aryan SG; Padmashree C Jain; Gagan Gowda; Uma Mayuri
- Cinematography: Ajaya Laxmikantha
- Edited by: Vijeth Chandran
- Music by: Vijeth Krishna
- Release date: 20 August 2021
- Running time: 112 minutes
- Country: India
- Language: Kannada

Groufie is a 2021 Indian Kannada language suspense thriller film directed by Ravi Arjun. The film starring Aryan SG, Padmashree C Jain, Gagan Gowda, Uma Mayuri, Prajwal Ranesinghe, Sandhya Gowda are in the lead roles. The music for the film is scored by Vijeth Krishna. The cinematography is by Ajaya Laxmikantha and editing is done by Vijeth Chandran. The film is produced by K G Swamy under Lia Global Media production company.

== Cast ==
- Aryan SG as Karthik
- Padmashree C Jain as Bhuvi
- Gagan Gowda as Punith
- Uma Mayuri as Poorvi
- Prajwal Ranesinghe as Shashank
- Sandhya Gowda as Sanika
