= Ninna Sanihake =

- Poster
- Directed by: Suraj Gowda
- Written by: Suraj Gowda
- Produced by: Akshay Rajshekar; Ranganath Kudli
- Starring: Suraj Gowda; Dhanya Ramkumar
- Cinematography: Abhilash Kalathi
- Edited by: Suresh Arumugam
- Music by: Raghu Dixit
- Production companies: White and Grey Pictures
- Distributed by: KRG Studios
- Release date: 8 October 2021
- Country: India
- Language: Kannada

Ninna Sanihake is a 2021 Indian Kannada-language romantic comedy film, directed by Suraj Gowda, produced by Akshay Rajshekar and Ranganath Kudli, under the banner White and Grey Pictures. The film stars Suraj Gowda and Dhanya Ramkumar. It was released on 8 October 2021.

== Cast ==
- Suraj Gowda as Aditya
- Dhanya Ramkumar as Amrutha
- Aruna Balraj
- Manjunath Hegde
- Soumya Bhat

== Production ==
The official photoshoot of the film was done on 1 July 2019, the video clipping of which was published in leading Kannada news websites. The first look poster of Ninna Sanihake was released during its first official press meet on 5 August 2019. The shoot of the film started in August 2019 after the movie's Muhurat, launched by Sandalwood actors Puneeth Rajkumar and Raghavendra Rajkumar, and director Dinakar Thoogudeepa.

== Music ==
The film's soundtrack is composed by Indian singer and composer Raghu Dixit.

=== Soundtrack ===
Ninna Sanihake

Soundtrack album by Raghu Dixit
- Released: 2020
- Genre: Film soundtrack
- Label: Raghu Dixit Music
External audio
- Official Audio Jukebox on YouTube

All tracks are written by Vasuki Vaibhav.

No.	Title	Performer(s)	Length
1.	"Nee Parichaya"	Siddhartha Belamannu, Rakshita Suresh	3:37
2.	"Olavaagidhe"	Benny Dayal, Aishwarya Rangarajan	4:03
3.	"Ninna Sanihake"	Sanjith Hegde, Shruthi V. S.	3:56
4.	"The Sound of Chaos"	Raghu Dixit	3:36
5.	"Yeko Idyeko"	Sanjith Hegde	2:22
6.	"Bere Irode"	Ramya Bhat Abhyankar	3:18
7.	"Maley Maley"	Raghu Dixit	4:51
8.	"The Spirit of Ninna Sanihake"	Instrumental	2:26
9.	"Nee Parichaya (Official Cover Song)"	Suraj Gowda, Dhanya Ramkumar	2:06
10.	"Odu Odu"	Raghu Dixit	2:10
Total length:			32:26
