= Suraj Gowda =

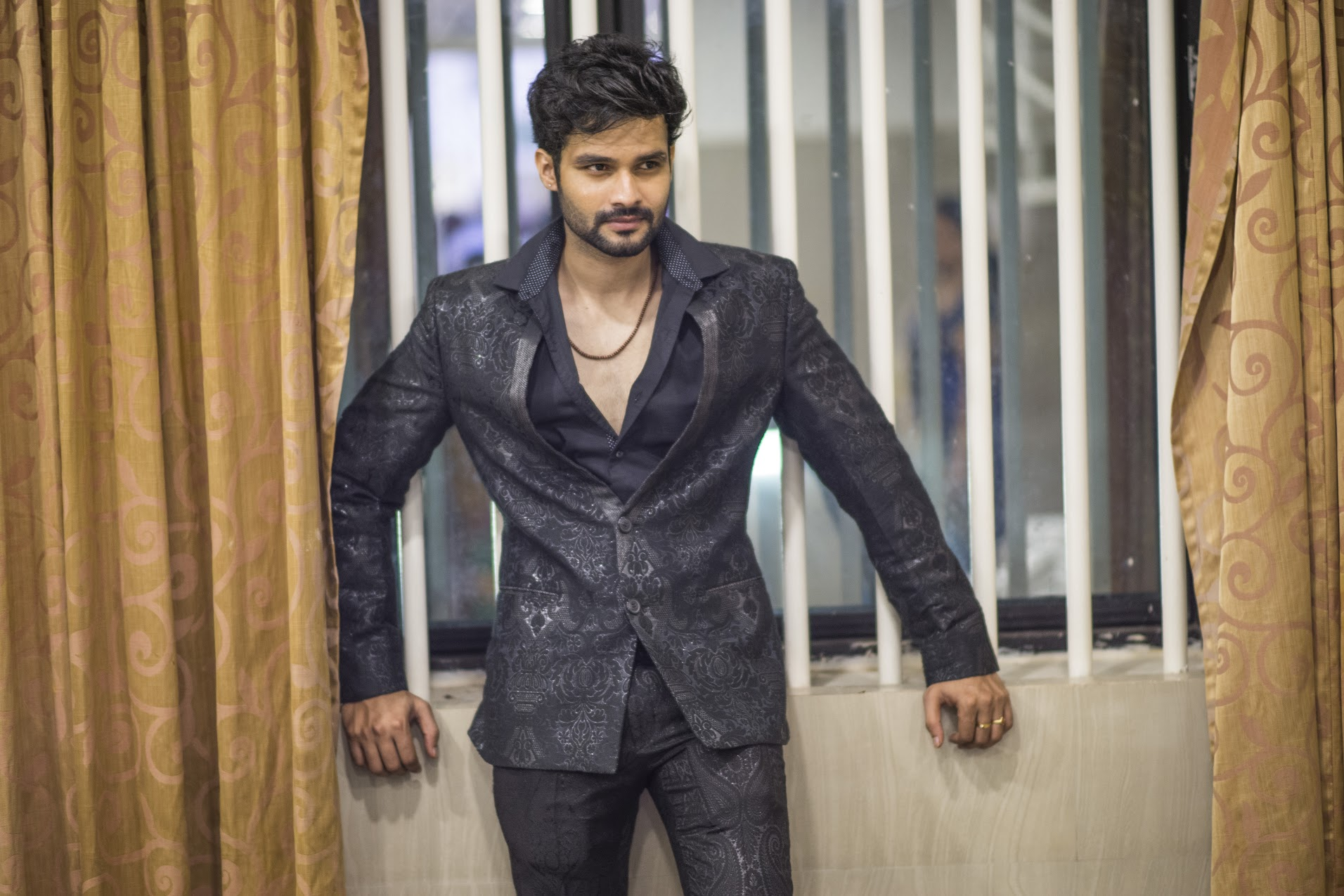
- Suraj Gowda
- Born: 13 April 1988 (age 37); Mysore, Karnataka India
- Occupations: Actor; Director; Writer
- Years active: 2009–present
- Parents: Prakash M A (father); Surekha V (mother)

Suraj Gowda (born 13 April 1988) is an actor in the Kannada film industry who made his big commercial debut in Maduveya Mamatheya Kareyole under Thoogudeepa productions which bagged the biggest opening collection for a debutant in 2016. Suraj was nominated for the best actor category in SIIMA and IIFA Awards for his role in the movie Siliconn City (2017). Lakshmi Thanaya and Ninna Sanihake are his upcoming films.

Suraj is also making a much awaited debut as a director and writer with the Kannada romantic comedy Ninna Sanihake.

== Early life and career ==
Born to M A Prakash and Surekha V in Mysore Karnataka India, Suraj Gowda is a model-turned actor who started his career in the film industry after winning Zee Kannada's reality show Paradeshadalli Paradata in 2011. This multi-talented prodigy is also the winner of Mr. Mysore and Mr. Karnataka titles in 2009 and 2013 respectively. Suraj debuted his film career with the art film Yenanthiya and with Ninna Sanihake, he is foraying into script writing and direction.

== Filmography ==
Key
†	Denotes films that have not yet been released

Year	Film	Role	Notes	Ref
2013	Yenanthiya	Ram		
2016	Maduveya Mamatheya Kareyole	Suraj		
2016	Kahi	Raghu		
2017	Siliconn City	Karthik	Nominated - SIIMA Award for Best Actor in a Supporting Role (Male) - Kannada	
2019	D/O Parvathamma	Ananthu		
2021	Ninna Sanihake	Aditya	Directorial Debut	

== Reality Show and Contest ==
Show	Year	Channel	Type	Notes	Ref
Paradeshadalli Paradata	2011	Zee Kannada	Reality Show	Won	
Mr Mysore	2009		Contest	Won	
Mr Karnataka	2013		Contest	Won	
