= Akshi =

Indian Kannada-language film

- Akshi Movie Poster
- Directed by: Manoj Kumar
- Written by: Manoj Kumar
- Produced by: Srinivas V; Ramesh N.; Ravi H.S
- Starring: Govinde Gowda (GG), Illa Vitla, Master Mithun, Kumari Soumya Prabhu, Nagraj Rao, Kalaadegula Srinivas, Kasturi Mulimani etc
- Cinematography: Mukul Gowda
- Music by: Kalaadegula Srinivas
- Production company: Kalaadegula Studio
- Release date: 3 December 2021
- Country: India
- Language: Kannada

Akshi (transl. Eye) is a 2021 Indian Kannada-language film written and directed by Manoj Kumar. Srinivas V., Ramesh N, Ravi Holalu has produced under Kalaadegula Studio and Kalaadegula Srinivas scored the music. The film explores the importance of eye donation. Akshi was awarded the National Film Award for Best Feature Film in Kannada.

== Plot ==
The story is set in a small village near Chikkamagulur coffee Estates. Here we meet Ramu, a 12-year-old boy who lives almost wholly for his younger sister, Lakshmi. Despite being blind at birth, Lakshmi is the apple of Ramu's and his father's eyes and Lakshmi who sings extremely well is also very smart. Ramu devotes himself to her making it his life's mission to help her experience life through the other four senses. Helping him is a 70-year-old man called Kurudappa, who is also blind by Birth.

With the arrival of a new doctor in the village, Ramu family understands that it is possible to get an eye transplant for his sister. He dreams of her gaining eyesight without a true comprehension of the complex challenges that lie ahead – from the long wait lists ahead for those waiting for eye donation, to the criteria that need to be fulfilled for eye donation and more. Yet, despite all that when Lakshmi gets approved as the recipient of a single eye, tragedy strikes. Heavy rains and landslides wreak havoc on the village and also claim the life of Lakshmi who walks into the disaster unknowingly.

After Lakshmi's funeral, the village including Ramu's parents return to normalcy. Ramu however is unable to comprehend a world without his sister. The villagers start questioning his mental health and his mother takes matters into her own hands by taking him to temples and hospitals. This is when Ramu comes across a school for the visually challenged. He delves deeper into the process of Eye Donation and talks to Kurudappa & Doctor about this, as well.

With his newfound knowledge, Ramu sets about to try and educate people in nearby villages. He tries to eradicate the superstitions and preconceived notions around eye donation. How could a child presume to be more educated than them? After Ramu tries to procure the eyes of an elderly person who had pledged his eyes before his death, the villagers react by violently thrashing him and branding him mad, leading his parents to agree with them. Slowly and surely, his parents come around despite their own misgivings and finally donate their own eyes.

As he continues with his work he gets the opportunity to team up with his class teacher who decides to help him with awareness. She writes a simple play about eye donation for Ramu to act in during the School's anniversary. The play is a huge success, impressing even the Panchayat President who agrees to open an eye donation camp for the village. But..... makes the climax of the story.

== Cast ==
- Govinde Gowda.
- Ila Vitla
- Kalaadegula Srinivas
- Master Mithun
- Kumari Sowmya Prabhu
- Nagaraj Rao
- Kasturi Mulimani

== Crew ==
Lyrics writer- Kalaadegula Srinivas, Manoj kumar

Editor- Manoj kumar, MukulGowda

Chief Associate Directors- Meena Raghu, Suneel Raj

Associate Directors- Yashwanth kumar, Shashi kiran, Chikkegowda

Assistant Directors- Puttaraju K.N., Dinesh, Nagesh, Avinash, Varun

Colourist- Nikhil karyappa

Dubbing engineer- Shankar

Sound Engineer- Shankar D

Audiography- Krishnamoorthy

== Music ==
Music Scored by Kalaadegula Srinivas

Background Music- Rajiv Jois (Crossfade Studios)

Singers- S.P. Balasubrahmanyam, Manasa Holla

== Production ==
Akshi is first film for the producer Kalaadegula Srinivas, Ramesh N, Ravi Holalu. The film was supposed to be released in 2020 itself due to COVID-19 the movie will have a delayed-release.

== Accolades ==
67th National Film Awards - 2019 Best Feature Film in Kannada
