= Bhoomi Shetty =

Indian Film Actor

- Born: Kundapura, Karnataka, India
- Occupation: Actress
- Years active: 2017–present

Bhoomika Shetty is an Indian actress known for her role in the Kannada-language television series Kinnari. and Telugu series Ninne Pelladatha. She was a contestant in the reality television show Bigg Boss Kannada and made it the finals. Shetty made her film debut with the 2021 Kannada film, Ikkat.

== Early life and family ==
Bhoomi Shetty hails from Kundapura, located in West coast Karavali region of Karnataka. She was born to Bhaskar and Baby Shetty in Kundapura, Karanataka. She speaks fluent Kannada and Tulu and Telugu. Bhoomi Shetty has learnt Yakshagana during her school days.

== Acting career ==
Shetty made her acting debut in the television series Kinnari. She played the lead character, Mani. She also played the main role of Mrudula in Telugu serial Ninne Pelladatha. In 2019, she appeared as a contestant in the seventh season of the reality TV show, Bigg Boss Kannada. In 2021, she briefly starred in Telugu TV series Akka Chellelu and then made her film debut with Kannada film, Ikkat premiered on Amazon Prime Video.

== Filmography ==
Year	Title	Role	Language	Notes
2021	Ikkat	Janvi "Jaanu"	Kannada	Debut film
2024	Sharathulu Varthisthai	Vijayashanthi	Telugu	
2025	Kingdom	Gauri	Telugu	
2026	Kendada Seragu	Pavitra	Kannada	
2027	Mahakali †	Mahakali	Telugu	Filming

=== Television ===
Year	Title	Role	Language	Channel
2018	Ninne Pelladatha	Mrudula	Telugu	Zee Telugu
2019-2020	Bigg Boss Kannada (season 7)	Contestant	Kannada	4th runner-up
2021	Attarintlo Akka Chellelu	Dharani	Telugu	Replaced Chaitra Rai

== Awards ==
Bhoomi Shetty won the Hyderabad Times, Most desirable woman of small screen for the year 2018.
