= Ikkat (film) =

2021 Kannada film by Haseen Khan and Esham Khan

- Official release poster
- Directed by: Haseen Khan; Esham Khan
- Written by: Haseen Khan; Esham Khan
- Produced by: Tara, Ayesha Khan; Pavan Kumar Studio
- Starring: Nagabhushana; Bhoomi Shetty
- Cinematography: Lavith
- Music by: Dossmode
- Distributed by: Amazon Prime Video
- Release date: 21 July 2021
- Running time: 125 minutes
- Country: India
- Language: Kannada

Ikkat (transl. Congestion, difficult situation) is a 2021 Indian Kannada-language comedy film written, directed and edited by Haseen Khan and Esham Khan. It was produced by Tara and Ayesha Khan on Pavan Kumar Studio. The film stars Nagabhushana and Bhoomi Shetty, her first acting role. The music used in the movie was composed by Dossmode.

The film was released on 21 July 2021 on Amazon Prime Video.

== Plot ==
Set in the halcyon days before the COVID-19 pandemic ravaged India, Ikkat portrays the life of Vasu (Nagabhushana) and Janvi (Bhoomi Shetty), a young couple living in suburban Bangalore. They frequently bicker over trivial issues. One such quarrel, partly fueled by a spider crawling around in the house, vastly blows up and leads them to contemplate divorce. However, the declaration of a lockdown by the Prime Minister, forces the duo to set aside their differences and the divorce is postponed by three weeks.

No sooner is a flag of truce raised between the two, than Dude Maga (RJ Vikki), a TikTok personality who corresponded with Janvi on TikTok, enters the couple's home and begins living there, unbeknownst to Vasu. Dude Maga proposes to Janvi and asks her to elope with him, but she flatly refuses and decides to evict him. However, his entreaties move Janvi, and she begins to clandestinely take care of Dude Maga, serving him food long after the house's occupants sleep. Vasu suspects of a presence in the house but is unable to justify his convictions. The arrival of Vasu's distant relative, Karna uncle (Sundar Veena), raises hackles since he appears to suffer from a rather severe cold, provoking fears of COVID-19 infection in the couple. Vasu confides his fears in Karna uncle about a presence in the house, and the two perform a Yajna to exorcise the spirit, catching Dude Maga in the process. He is expelled from the house, but not before Janvi reveals herself to be complicit about his presence in the house.

Karna uses this information to bad-mouth Janvi and cast slanderous allegations about her character to Vasu, expecting him to divorce Janvi. However, Vasu chooses to trust Janvi and give her a second chance, owing to her truthful nature, and decides to show Karna the door due to his increasingly insufferable behavior. Karna refuses, but a COVID-19 response team sent by Vasu's nosy neighbour Murthy (who suspected Karna of carrying the COVID-19 infection) arrives, and finding him symptomatic, escort him to quarantine. The couple reconcile, and watch the Prime Minister extending the imposed lockdown on TV with the spider crawling over the TV. This causes them to start bickering again.

== Cast ==
- Nagabhushana as Vasu
- Bhoomi Shetty as Janvi "Jaanu"
- Sunder as Karna, Vasu's uncle
- Anand Ninasam as Murthy, Vasu's neighbor
- RJ Vikki as Dude Maga, Janvi's TikTok partner

== Soundtrack ==
Ikkat

Film score by DossMode
- Released: 2021
- Genre: Soundtrack
- Length: 15:55
- Label: Aananda Audio

Music is composed by Dossmode and released on Aananda Audio.

No.	Title	Lyrics	Singer(s)	Length
1.	"Ikkat Title Track"	Sujith Venkataramaiah	Supriyaa Ram, Dossmode	3:41
2.	"a'choose me"	Sujith Venkataramaiah	Vasuki Vaibhav	3:47
3.	"Bhoota Track"	Sujith Venkataramaiah	Shivraj Natraj	3:57
4.	"Visvamaya (Jagavella Sundara) Track"		Aadhya V Murgod, MaanyaBhat, Navya, Saadhana, Trayi Dossmode and others	4:30
Total length:				15:55

== Release ==
The film was released on 21 July 2021 on Amazon Prime Video.

== Reception ==
The film garnered positive reviews. Indian Express rated the film 3/5, and praised the movie as "Ikkat is packed with clean humour, which is rooted in the way Bengalureans live, talk, eat and entertain each other. The comedy stems from the couple's struggle to cope with life under lockdown." Times of India rated the film 3/5, and praised the movie as a laugh riot. The News Minute rated the film 3.5/5, praising the performance of lead actors NagaBhushana and Bhoomi Shetty. Deccan Herald rated the film 3.5/5 and termed it as a delightful comedy drama. Leisurebyte's review was not positive and termed the movie as being "mediocre and boring".

== Accolades ==
Awards	Category	Recipient	Result	Ref
10th South Indian International Movie Awards	Best Debutant Actor- Kannada	Nagabhushana	Won	
10th South Indian International Movie Awards	Best Debut Actress	Bhoomi Shetty	Nominated	
