= List of Kannada films of 2024 =

This is a list of Kannada films that were released in 2024.

== Box office collection ==
The highest-grossing Kannada films released in 2024 by worldwide box office gross revenue are as follows:

Highest grossing Kannada films of 2024
| Rank | Title | Production company | Worldwide gross | Ref |
|---|---|---|---|---|
| 1 | Max | V Creations; Kiccha Creations | ₹62 crore | |
| 2 | UI | Lahari Films; Venus Entertainers | ₹47 crore | |
| 3 | Bhairathi Ranagal | Geetha Pictures | ₹30 crore | |
| 4 | Bagheera | Hombale Films | ₹30 crore | |
| 5 | Bheema | Jagadish Films; Krishna Creations | ₹29.2 crore | |
| 6 | Martin | Uday K Mehta Films; Vasavi Enterprises | ₹27.6 crore | |
| 7 | Krishnam Pranaya Sakhi | Trishul Entertainments | ₹25.2 crore | |
| 8 | Yuva | Hombale Films | ₹19.4 crore | |
| 9 | Upadhyaksha | DN Cinemas; Umapathi Films | ₹10 crore | |

== January–March ==
| Opening | | Title | Director | Main Cast | Production company | Ref. |
|---|---|---|---|---|---|---|
| J A N U A R Y | 5 | Adarsha Raitha | Rajendra Konidela | Amarnath Reddy; Khushi Mahato; Mysore Sujatha; Rekha Das | Kumuda Art Creations | |
| J A N U A R Y | 5 | Online Madhuve Offline Shobana | Bavaji Vempalli | Jagadish Kumar; Sushmitha Sonu; Seerunde Raghu; Raghavi Shankar | Apsara Movies | |
| J A N U A R Y | 5 | Onty Bunty Love Story | Yathish Pannasamudra | Vaibhav Vardhan; Yathish Pannasamudra; Shweta Bhat; Shruthi Chandrashekar | Adyah Studios | |
| J A N U A R Y | 19 | Barbarika | Shandilya | Skanda Ashok; Sirri Raju; B. M. Venkatesh; Bala Rajwadi | Sri Lakshmi Janardhana Movies | |
| J A N U A R Y | 19 | Jotheyagiru | Sathish Kumar | Venkatesh Hegde; Sunil Kanchan; Rashmi Gowda; Pooja Achar | Renu Movies | |
| J A N U A R Y | 19 | Kadal | Ravi Basrur | Suchan Shetty; Chirashree Anchan; Sourabh Bhandary; Vijay Basrur | Omkar Movies | |
| J A N U A R Y | 19 | Klaantha | Vaibhav Prashanth | Vignesh; Sangeetha Bhat; Yuva | Anugraha Power Media | |
| J A N U A R Y | 19 | Matthe Matthe | Arun Hosakoppa | Sanjjana; M. S. Umesh; Dingri Nagaraj; Mukhyamantri Chandru; Honnavalli Krishna | Nairutya Arts | |
| J A N U A R Y | 19 | Rangasamudra | Rajkumar Aski | Rangayana Raghu; Raghavendra Rajkumar; Sampath Raj; Ugram Manju | Hoysala Creations | |
| J A N U A R Y | 26 | Alexa | Jeeva Levis | Pavan Teja; Aditi Prabhudeva; Hanumanthe Gowda; Nagarjun Balappa | Sri Bhuvanesh Productions | |
| J A N U A R Y | 26 | Bachelor Party | Abhijit Mahesh | Diganth; Yogesh; Achyuth Kumar; Siri Ravikumar | Paramvah Studios | |
| J A N U A R Y | 26 | Case of Kondana | Devi Prasad Shetty | Vijay Raghavendra; Bhavana; Kushee Ravi; Rangayana Raghu | Flying Elephant Story Tellers | |
| J A N U A R Y | 26 | Hadinelentu | Prithvi Konanur | Sherlyn Bhosale; Neeraj Mathew; Lakshmi Murthy; Sudha Belawadi | Konanur Productions | |
| J A N U A R Y | 26 | Koli Esru | Champa P Shetty | Akshatha Pandavapura; Natana Manju; Apeksha Nagaraju; Dakshayini N | Apron Productions | |
| J A N U A R Y | 26 | Upadhyaksha | Anil Kumar | Chikkanna; Malaika Vasupal; Sadhu Kokila; Ravi Shankar | DN Cinemas | |
| F E B R U A R Y | 2 | Click | Shashi Kumar Mandya | Karthik Kadamba; Rachana Dasharat; Pavan Basrur; Sumana Shashi | Sharanya Films | |
| F E B R U A R Y | 2 | Crush | Abhi N | Panchi S; Pratibha Soppimath; Abhinaya | Smiley Creations | |
| F E B R U A R Y | 2 | Satyam Shivam | Yathiraj | Kammasandra Raju; Sanjana Naidu; Bala Rajwadi; Aravind Rao | Yashoda Raj Creations | |
| F E B R U A R Y | 2 | Supplier Shankara | Ranjith Singh Rajput | Nischith Korodi; Deepika Aradhya; Gopalkrishna Deshpande; Naveen D. Padil | Trinethra Films | |
| F E B R U A R Y | 2 | Yathabhava | Gautham Basavaraju & Nirmal Joshi | H. G. Dattatreya; Gopalkrishna Deshpande; Bala Rajwadi; Shiva Prasad; Yashaswini Ravindra | Macht Entertainments | |
| F E B R U A R Y | 8 | Ondu Sarala Prema Kathe | Simple Suni | Vinay Rajkumar; Mallika Singh; Swathishta Krishnan; Karthik Mahesh | Ram Movies | |
| F E B R U A R Y | 9 | Juni | Vaibhav Mahadev | Pruthvi Ambaar; Rishika Naik; Sudharani; Avinash; Vinaya Prasad | Trishul Creations; 12 Months Film Plant | |
| F E B R U A R Y | 9 | Just Pass | K. M. Raghu | Shri Mahadev; Pranathi BG; Sadhu Kokila; Rangayana Raghu | Roy's Entertainment | |
| F E B R U A R Y | 9 | Maaye and Company | B Sandeep Kumar | Arjun Kishore Chandra; Anusha Anand; Yashaswini; Naveendra Gangadhar | Mathrushree Vision | |
| F E B R U A R Y | 9 | Naguvina Hoogala Mele | Venkat Bharadwaj | Abhi Das; Sharanya Shetty; Bala Rajwadi | Sri Sathya Sai Arts | |
| F E B R U A R Y | 9 | Pranayam | Dattatreya S | Raja Vardan; Naina Ganguly; Raghava Nayak | Mansi Ventures; P2 Productions | |
| F E B R U A R Y | 15 | Saramsha | Surya Vasishta | Deepak Subramanya; Shruti Hariharan; Shweta Gupta; Surya Vasishta | Vibha Kashyap Productions; Klapboard Productions | |
| F E B R U A R Y | 16 | 5D | S. Narayan | Aditya; Aditi Prabhudeva; S. Narayan | One to Hundred Dream Movies | |
| F E B R U A R Y | 16 | Abbabba | K. M. Chaitanya | Likith Shetty; Amrutha Iyengar; Ajay Raj; Dhanraj Achar; Anusha Rai | Friday Film House | |
| F E B R U A R Y | 16 | Alemari Ee Baduku | Siddu C Kattimani | Sridhar Atavi; Jaanu Suresh; Sandeep Mallikarjun; Deepa Hebbar | Sri Kalabhairava Productions | |
| F E B R U A R Y | 16 | KTM | Aruna | Dheekshith Shetty; Sanjana Doss; Abhishek Srikanth; Kaajal Kunder | Mahasimha Movies | |
| F E B R U A R Y | 16 | Ladies Bar | Muttu A. N. | Harish Raj; Prerana Gowda; Diana Jessika; T M Somaraj | DMC Productions | |
| F E B R U A R Y | 16 | Mandya Haida | Srikanth Pandavapura | Geetha Bharathi Bhat; Suman Ranganathan; Rakesh Maiyya; Praveen Atharva | Tejas Creation | |
| F E B R U A R Y | 16 | Ravike Prasanga | Santhosh Kodenkeri | Abhay Chandru; Bhumika Bhumesh; Bala Rajwadi | Drusti Media & Productions | |
| F E B R U A R Y | 16 | Shakhahaari | Sandeep Sunkad | Rangayana Raghu; Vinay Jarimalli; Nidhi Hegde; Harini Shreekanth; Gopalkrishna Deshpande | Keelambi Media Lab & Last Page Creations | |
| F E B R U A R Y | 23 | Dhairyam Sarvatra Sadhanam | A R Sai Ram | Vivan Kolar Kesava; Anusha Rai; Ram Pavan Shet; Bala Rajwadi | AP Productions | |
| F E B R U A R Y | 23 | For Regn | Naveen Dwarkanath | Pruthvi Ambaar; Milana Nagaraj; P. Ravishankar; Sudha Belawadi | Nischal Films | |
| F E B R U A R Y | 23 | Kappu Bilupina Naduve | Vasanth Vishnu | Vasanth Vishnu; Vidhyashree Gowda; Sharath Lohitashwa; Vaijanath Biradar | Gold Shine Productions; Golden Elephant Productions | |
| F E B R U A R Y | 23 | Matsyagandha | Devaraj Poojary | Pruthvi Ambaar; Saurav Lokesh; Sharath Lohitashwa; Prashanth Siddhi | Sahyadri Productions | |
| F E B R U A R Y | 23 | Mr. Natwarlal | Lava Kaggere | Tanush Shivanna; Sonal Monteiro; Nagabhushana; Rajesh Nataranga | Tanush Cinemas | |
| F E B R U A R Y | 23 | Ondu Pishachiya Kathe | Ekalavya Kumar | Sanjith Raj; Ravi Shreyas; Ekalavya Kumar | Shri Dattatreya Cinemas | |
| F E B R U A R Y | 23 | Pretha | Harish Raj | Harish Raj; Ahira Shetty; Amulya Bharadwaj | Harish Raj Productions | |
| M A R C H | 1 | Chaya | Jaggu Master | Anand Arya; Teju Raj | New Global Creations | |
| M A R C H | 1 | Girinad Prema | Yuvaraj S. Guttedar | Sharnu Pattedar; Soumya Theethira; Raushan Lawrence | 4K Film Studio Production | |
| M A R C H | 1 | Jugalbandi | Diwakar Dimdima | Santhosh Ashray; Manasi Sudheer; Ashwin Rao Pallakki; Yash Shetty | Dimdima Productions; Visica Films | |
| M A R C H | 1 | Kreem | Abhishek Basanth | Samyuktha Hegde; Agni Shridhar; Arun Sagar; Achyuth Kumar | Samvurdhini Productions | |
| M A R C H | 1 | Namo Bharath | Ramesh S Paravinaikar | Ramesh S Paravinaikar; Bhavya; Sushma Raj; Doddarangegowda | Shree Chowdeshwari Films | |
| M A R C H | 1 | Purushothamana Prasanga | Devadas Kapikad | Ajaya Pruthvi; Rishika Naik; Devadas Kapikad; Naveen D. Padil | Rashtrakoota Pictures | |
| M A R C H | 7 | Jog 101 | Vijay Kannadiga | Vijay Raghavendra; Tejaswini Shekar; Thilak Shekar; Rajesh Nataranga | Seven Star Pictures | |
| M A R C H | 8 | Blink | Srinidhi Bengaluru | Dheekshith Shetty; Chaithra J Achar; Mandara Battalahalli; Gopalkrishna Deshpande | Janani Pictures | |
| M A R C H | 8 | Kailasa Kasidre | Nag Venkat | Ravi Kiran Narasimhalu; Sukanya Girish; Suraj; Ninasam Ashwath | Mahad Pictures | |
| M A R C H | 8 | Karataka Damanaka | Yogaraj Bhat | Shiva Rajkumar; Prabhu Deva; Priya Anand; Nishvika Naidu; Rockline Venkatesh | Rockline Entertainments | |
| M A R C H | 8 | Koleyadavane Kolegara | Mallikarjun Hiretanad | Siddhu N. R.; Chandrika Nagesh; Kiran Somanna; Bala Rajwadi | Abhay Productions | |
| M A R C H | 8 | Manadarasi | T. S. Krishnamurthy | Rupesh G. Raj; Suhaana S. Gowda; Preethu Pooja | PKR Productions | |
| M A R C H | 8 | Ranganayaka | Guruprasad | Jaggesh; Rachitha Mahalakshmi; Guruprasad; Yogaraj Bhat | Vikyath Chitra Productions | |
| M A R C H | 15 | Chow Chow Bath | Kenja Chethan Kumar | Aruna Balraj; Sagar Gowda; Sushmitha Bhat; Sankalp Sharma | Kamadhenu Films; Sanatanay Pictures; Horizzon Movies | |
| M A R C H | 15 | Hide and Seek | Punith Nagaraju | Anoop Revanna; Dhanya Ramkumar; Rajesh Nataranga; Bala Rajwadi | Suneri Art Creations | |
| M A R C H | 15 | Kerebete | Rajguru Bheemappa | Gowrishankar; Bindu Shivaram; Gopalkrishna Deshpande; Harini Shreekanth | Janamana Cinemas | |
| M A R C H | 15 | Mehabooba | Anup Anthony | Shashikumar B. S.; Paavana Gowda; Kabir Duhan Singh; Jai Jagadish | Sri Balaji Motion Pictures; Daksh Entertainments | |
| M A R C H | 15 | Photo | Utsav Gonwar | Mahadev Hadapad; Sandhya Arakere; Veeresh Gonwar; Jahangeer MS | Masari Talkies | |
| M A R C H | 15 | Somu Sound Engineer | Abhi Basavaraj | Shreshta Basavaraj; Nishvika Patil; Yash Shetty | Aartha Entertainers | |
| M A R C H | 22 | Dilkush | Pramod Jaya | Ranjeeth Dev; Spandana Somanna; Rangayana Raghu; Aruna Balraj | Jayaprabha Colour Frames | |
| M A R C H | 22 | Lineman | Raghu Shastry | Thrigun; Kaajal Kunder; B. Jayashree; Harini Shreekanth | Purple Rock Entertainers | |
| M A R C H | 22 | Rakshasa Tantra | Megha Akshara | Megha Akshara; Rakshita Mallik; Thilak K; Sukesh | Suragi Pictures | |
| M A R C H | 22 | Thooth Kaasu | Ravi Thejas | Vharun Devaiah; Shravan Halli; Prerna Bhat; Prisha Patted | Shree Karagadamma Devi Cine Creations | |
| M A R C H | 29 | Yuva | Santhosh Ananddram | Yuva Rajkumar; Sapthami Gowda | Hombale Films | |
| M A R C H | 29 | Tharini | Siddu Poornachandra | Rohith Rangaswamy; Mamatha Rahuth; Bhavani Prakash | Shree Gajani Productions | |

== April–June ==
| Opening | | Title | Director | Main Cast | Production company | Ref. |
|---|---|---|---|---|---|---|
| A P R I L | 5 | Avatara Purusha 2 | Suni | Sharan; Ashika Ranganath; Sai Kumar; Bhavya; Sudha Rani; Ashutosh Rana | Pushkar Films | |
| A P R I L | 5 | Bharjari Gandu | Prasiddh | Kiran Raj; Yasha Shivakumar; Nisarga Lakshman; Ramesh Bhat; Rohith Nagesh; Rakesh Raj; Veena Sundar | Prasidda Cinemas | |
| A P R I L | 5 | Marigold | Raghavendra M. Naik | Diganth; Sangeetha Sringeri; Sampath Mythria; Yash Shetty | R.V. Creations | |
| A P R I L | 5 | Matinee | Manohar Kampalli | Sathish Ninasam; Rachita Ram; Aditi Prabhudeva; Nagabhushana; Shivraj KR Pete | F3 Productions | |
| A P R I L | 12 | Appa I Love You | Atharv Arya | Prem; Manvita Kamath; Tabla Nani; Bala Rajwadi | KRS Productions | |
| A P R I L | 12 | Muktha Manasu | R. C. Rangashekar | Mohan Ranganatha; Manya Gowda; Shobhraj; Ramesh Pandit | S.L.J. Production | |
| A P R I L | 12 | Night Curfew | Venshi Ravindra | Malashri; Ranjani Raghavan; Pramod Shetty; Sadhu Kokila | Swarna Ganga Films | |
| A P R I L | 12 | Scam 1770 | Vikas Pushpagiri | Raghu Shivamogga; B. Suresha; Ranjan | D Creations | |
| A P R I L | 19 | Chirathe Banthu Chirathe | C. R. Krishnamurthy | Sundar Veena; Girish Shivanna; N K Ramakrishna | JRK Visions | |
| A P R I L | 19 | Dasavarenya Sri Vijayadasaru | Madhusudhan Havaldar | Trivikram Joshi; Srilatha Bagevadi; Vishnutheertha Joshi | SPJ Movies | |
| A P R I L | 19 | Naalkane Aayama | Gowtham. R | Gowtham. R; Rachana Inder; Yashaswini.M; Bala Rajwadi | Inchara Creations | |
| A P R I L | 19 | O2 | Prashanth Rajendra; Raghav Nayak | Ashika Ranganath; Praveen Tej; Raghav Nayak; Prakash Belawadi | PRK Productions | |
| A P R I L | 19 | Partner | T. R. Gowtham Gowda | Sathish Krishna Shetty; Chethas. R; Preethi Mirajkar; Bala Rajwadi | Navilu Vayuputra Combines | |
| A P R I L | 19 | Ratna | Basavaraj Bellary | Vardhan; Harshala Honey; Nagendra Urs; Bala Rajwadi | Basavaraj Bellary Cinema | |
| A P R I L | 19 | Samrat Mandhatha | Hemantha Kumar | Basavaraju. C; R. Sundara Babu; Chaithra Kotresh; Bharathi P. K. | Hemanth's Productions | |
| A P R I L | 26 | Athma | S. R. Pramod | Anil C R; Kavya R V; Preethi V Sokker | Viraj Film Studio | |
| A P R I L | 26 | Ithyadi | D. Yogaraj | Sachin Jayasimha; Anand Babu; Sowmya. J | Charandev Creations; Advaitha Films; Neelakanta Films | |
| M A Y | 3 | Kangaroo | Kishore Megalamane | Aditya; Ranjani Raghavan; Shivamani; Ashwin Hassan | Arohi Productions | |
| M A Y | 3 | Usire Usire | C. M. Vijay | Sudeepa; Rajeev Hanu; Srijita Gosh; Suchendra Prasad; Brahmanandam; Ali; Sadhu Kokila; Devaraj; Manju Pavagada | Gombe Productions | |
| M A Y | 10 | 4N6 | Darshan Srinivas | Naveen Kumar Mahadev; Rachana Inder; Adhya Shekar; Bhavani Prakash | Purple Patch Pictures | |
| M A Y | 10 | Alaikyaa | Saatvik Bhupathi | Darshini Odeyar; Nisarga B S; Kavya P; Manveer Chauhan; Vivek Chakravarthi | Hitesh Movies | |
| M A Y | 10 | Grey Games | Gangadhar Salimatha | Vijay Raghavendra; Bhavana Rao; Shruthi Prakash; Ravi Bhat; Aparna | Bees Productions | |
| M A Y | 10 | Ramana Avatara | Vikas Pampapathi | Rishi; Pranitha Subhash; Shubra Aiyappa; Arun Sagar; Aniruddh Acharya | Star Fab Productions | |
| M A Y | 17 | Kirathaka 2 | Pradeep Raj | R K Tejas; Yash Shetty; Sudharani; Ravishankar Gowda | Baindoor Constructions | |
| M A Y | 17 | Rana Haddu | Jungli Prasanna | Shashank; Siya; Suraj; Dingri Nagaraj; Jungli Prasanna; Bhagyashree | Biligiri Combines | |
| M A Y | 17 | Switch { Case N: | Chethan Sanjeeva Shetty | Vijay Suriya; Shwetha Vijaykumar; Prithvi Raj; Vijay Siddiraj | Kondana Films | |
| M A Y | 17 | The Suit | S Bhagat Raj | Sujay Arya; Umesh Banakar; V. Nagendra Prasad; Dhanvi Kote; Deepthi Kapse | Abhyudaya Combines | |
| M A Y | 24 | 3Devi | Ashvin Mathew | Shubha Poonja; Jyotsna B. Rao; Sandhya Lakshminarayanan; Ashwin Kakumanu; Ashvin Mathew; Nikhil Bharadwaj | Altered Ego Entertainment | |
| M A Y | 24 | Evidence | Praveena C. P. | Robo Ganesh; Manasa Joshi; Aakarsh Adithya; Karthik Varnekar | Shri Dhruthi Production | |
| M A Y | 24 | Moorane Krishnappa | Naveen Narayanaghatta | Rangayana Raghu; Sampath Maitreya; Sripriya; Tukali Santosh; Ugramm Manju | Red Dragon Films | |
| M A Y | 24 | The Judgement | Gururaj Kulkarni | V Ravichandran; Lakshmi Gopalaswamy; Diganth; Dhanya Ramkumar; Meghana Gaonkar | G9 Communication Media and Entertainments | |
| M A Y | 31 | Nirmuktha | Ramya Srinivas | Abhishek C. K.; Navvya Poojary; Shrikanth | RS Motion Pictures | |
| J U N E | 7 | Anartha | Ramesh Krishna Neenasam | Vishal Mannur; Vihani Gowda; Rakshit Atharva; Arpita Navarasa | Tejas Cince Creations | |
| J U N E | 7 | Kandor Mane Kathe | Pranav V. Shetty | Suraj Kumar; Rakshita Keremane; Dingri Nagaraj; Apoorva Sri | Namana Creations | |
| J U N E | 7 | Sahara | Manjesh Bhagwath | Sarika Rao; Ankush Rajath; Sudharani; Manjunath Hegde | Maa Creations | |
| J U N E | 7 | Young Man | Muthu Raj H. R. | Sunil K Ravi; Shruthi Sundar; Nayana Krishna | Friends Picture Creations; Pari Movie Makers | |
| J U N E | 14 | Chef Chidambara | M Anand Raj | Aniruddha Jatkar; Rachel David; Nidhi Subbaiah | Damthi Pictures | |
| J U N E | 14 | Kotee | Parameshwar Gundkal | Dhananjaya; Moksha Kushal; Ramesh Indira; Tara; Rangayana Raghu | Jio Studios; Vaishno Studios | |
| J U N E | 14 | Love Li | Chethan Keshav | Vasishta Simha; Stefy Patel; Achyuth Kumar; Malavika Avinash | Abhuvanasa Creations | |
| J U N E | 14 | Shivamma Yarehanchinala | Jaishankar Aryar | Sharanamma Chatti; Chennamma Abbegere; Shivu Abbegere; Shruthi Kondenahalli; Chennappa Hansi; Shivanand Sadar | Rishab Shetty Films | |
| J U N E | 14 | Yavoo Ivella | Harish Sa. Ra. | Harish Sa. Ra.; Shilpa Naik; Jagan Shet | Rashree Arts | |
| J U N E | 21 | Arata | Pushparaj Rai | Ranjan Kasaragodu; Venya Rai; Jyotish Shetty; Sunil Nelligudde; Anil Raj Uppal | P. N. R. Films | |
| J U N E | 21 | Chilli Chicken | Pratheek Pradosh | Shrunga B. V.; Bijou Thaangjam; Hirock Sonowal; Jimpa Sangpo | Metandia Studios | |
| J U N E | 21 | Desai | Nagi Reddy Bada | H. Praveen Kumar; Radhya; Madhusudan Rao; Orata Prakash | Shri Veerabadreshwar Creative Films | |
| J U N E | 21 | Ramesh Suresh | Nagaraj Malligenahalli | Benak Gubbi Veeranna; Yashu Raj; Chandana Segu; Sadhu Kokila | RK Talkies | |
| J U N E | 21 | Sambhavami Yuge Yuge | Chandan Chandrashekhar Shetty | Jay Shetty; Nisha Rajput; Pramod Shetty; Sudha Rani; Bhavya; Ashok Kumar; Madhura Gowda; Abhay Puneeth; Bala Rajwadi; Ashwin Hassan | Rajalakshmi Entertainment | |
| J U N E | 28 | Happy Birthday To Me | Rakesh Kadri | Chaithra J Achar; Sidhartha Maadhyamika; Siddu Moolimani | Shoolin Films | |
| J U N E | 28 | Karmadolage | Shandilya | Gaja; Santhosh; Bala Rajwadi | Cinema Balaga | |

== July–September ==
| Opening | | Title | Director | Cast | Studio | Ref |
|---|---|---|---|---|---|---|
| J U L Y | 5 | Bisi-Bisi Ice-Cream | Arvind Sastry | Aravind Iyer; Siri Ravikumar; Gopalkrishna Deshpande | Nagaari Creations | |
| J U L Y | 5 | Jigar | Suri Kunder | Praveen Tej; Vijayashree Kalburgi; Bala Rajwadi; Vinaya Prasad; Yash Shetty | UK Productions | |
| J U L Y | 5 | Kaadaadi | Satheesh Malempati | Aditya Shashikumar; Lavannya Sahukara; Chandini Tamilarasan; Ravi Kale | Arunam Films | |
| J U L Y | 5 | Kaagada | Ranjith | Aditya; Ankita Jayaram; Bala Rajwadi; Neenasam Ashwath; Math Koppala | Amma Cine Creations | |
| J U L Y | 12 | Kali Kudukaru | Karan Savyasachi | Lohith K. Gopal; Rithyaa Gowda; Mahesh Nagaraju; Sharath Sagar | AM Creations | |
| J U L Y | 19 | Back Bencherz | Rajashekhar | Jatin Arya; Akash; Shashank Singh; Manya Gouda; Kunkum; Anusha Suresh; Manoj Shetty; Namitha Gouda; Suchendra Prasad | PP Productions | |
| J U L Y | 19 | Hejjaru | Harshapriya | Bhagat Alva; Shwetha Leonilla D Souza; Gopalkrishna Deshpande; Aruna Balraj; Naveen Krishna | Gagana Enterprises; Ramji Films | |
| J U L Y | 19 | Hiranya | Prawin Ayukth | Raja Vardan; Rihana Shiek; Divya Suresh; Huli Karthik | Vedas Infinite Pictures | |
| J U L Y | 19 | Not Out | M. Ambarish | P. Ravishankar; Ajay Prithvi; Rachana Inder; Gopalkrishna Deshpande | Rashtrakuta Pictures | |
| J U L Y | 19 | Vidhyarthi Vidhyarthiniyare | Arun Amukta | Chandan Shetty; Aravind Rao; Bhavana Appu; Manasvi; Amar; Prashanth Sambargi | Variety Creations | |
| J U L Y | 26 | Family Drama | Akarsh H. P. | Abhay; Sindhu Srinivas Murthy; Poornachandra Mysuru; Ananya Amar | DMK Entertainments | |
| J U L Y | 26 | Kenda | Sahadev Kelvadi | B. V. Bharath; Pranav Shridhar; Vinod Ravindran; Sathish Kumar; Pruthvi Banwasi; Deepti Nagendra | Ameyukti Studios | |
| J U L Y | 26 | Raktaksha | Vasudeva S. N. | Rohit Shanmukhappa; Pramod Shetty; Roopa Rayappa; Archana Kottige; Rachana Dasharath | Sai Productions | |
| J U L Y | 26 | Roopanthara | Mithilesh Edavalath | Raj B. Shetty; Lekha Naidu; Bharath G. B.; Anjan A. Bharadwaj | Mango Pickle Entertainment Jani Entertainment | |
| J U L Y | 26 | Sanketh | Jyotsna K. Rao | Chaithra Shetty; Vicky Rao; Mohan Sheni; Rahul Amin | Riverstream Studios | |
| A U G U S T | 2 | Adavi Katte | Sanjeev Gavandi | Abhijith Rao; Shanthi Anshrik; Nagaraju N | Shri Balaji Studios | |
| A U G U S T | 2 | Ishq | Vinay Raghavendra | Raju Thyagaraju; Shwetha Bhat; Chethan Durga; Shashank Raghavendra | Milana Films | |
| A U G U S T | 9 | Bheema | Duniya Vijay | Duniya Vijay; Aswini; Black Dragon Manju; Gili Gili Chandru; Kalyani Raju | Jagadish Films; Krishna Creations | |
| A U G U S T | 9 | Genius Mutta | Nagini Bharana; T. S. Nagabharana | Shreyas Jaiprakash; Priya Avinash; Suman Jadugar; Padmavati; T. S. Nagabharana; Girija Lokesh; Sundar Raj; Pannaga Bharana | BMK Creations | |
| A U G U S T | 9 | Idu Entha Lokavayya | Sithesh C. Govind | Vishwanath Asaigoli; Harish Bangera; Gopinath Bhat; Sithesh C. Govind; Shashiraj Kavoor | Kadlekai Films | |
| A U G U S T | 9 | Kabandha | Satyanath | Prasad Vasisth; Kishore Kumar G.; Avinash Yelandur; Prashanth Siddi; Priyanka Malali | Kunjara Films Hobox Studios | |
| A U G U S T | 15 | Gowri | Indrajit Lankesh | Samarjit Lankesh; Saanya Iyer; Akul Balaji; Sihi Kahi Chandru; Mukhyamantri Chandru; Malati Sudhir; Sampath Maitreya | Laughing Buddha Films | |
| A U G U S T | 15 | Krishnam Pranaya Sakhi | Srinivas Raju | Ganesh; Malvika Nair; Sharanya; Srinivas Murthy; Sadhu Kokila; Rangayana Raghu; Shashikumar; Shruti; Ashok | Trishul Entertainments | |
| A U G U S T | 23 | C | Kiran Subramani | Kiran Subramani; Sanvitha; Sridhar Ram; Prashanth Natana; Roopesh Arya | AGS Creations | |
| A U G U S T | 23 | Powder | Janardhan Chikkanna | Diganth; Dhanya Ramkumar; Sharmiela Mandre; Anirudh Acharya; Rangayana Raghu; Ravishankar Gowda | KRG Studios | |
| A U G U S T | 23 | Taj | Rajarathna B. | Shanmuka Jai; Padma Vasanthi; Shobhraj; Vardhan | Shri Pavani Lakshmi Combines | |
| A U G U S T | 23 | The Journalist | Vedanth Harsh | Aaryan Harish; Ranjitha J. Murthy; Nagendra Kote; Chiranjeevi V. G.; Bharath Chakravarty | Picture Palace Productions; Home Screen Studio | |
| A U G U S T | 30 | Laughing Buddha | M. Bharath Raj | Pramod Shetty; Diganth; Teju Belawadi; Sundar Raj | Rishab Shetty Films | |
| A U G U S T | 30 | My Hero | Avinash Vijaykumar | Eric Roberts; Vedic Kaushal; Djilali Rez-Kallah; Ankita Amar; Niranjan Deshpande; H. G. Dattatreya | AV Studios | |
| A U G U S T | 30 | Pepe | Sreelesh S. Nair | Vinay Rajkumar; Kaajal Kunder; Mayur Patel; Naveen D. Padil; Yash Shetty; Aruna Balraj | Deepa Films; Uday Cine Ventures | |
| A U G U S T | 30 | Taekwondo Girl | Venshi Ravindra | Ruthu Sparsha; Pravin Bhanu; Sumitha Pravin; Sahanashree | Atthreyaa Creations | |
| A U G U S T | 30 | The Rulers | Uday Bhaskar R. | Vishal Kumar B. G.; Ritu Anagha | A Balagere Cinemas | |
| S E P T E M B E R | 5 | Ibbani Tabbida Ileyali | Chandrajith Belliappa | Vihan Gowda; Ankita Amar; Girija Shettar; Mayuri Nataraja; Shankar Murthy S. R.; Salman Sheriff | Paramvah Studios | |
| S E P T E M B E R | 6 | A Day In Dollarspete | Mohan N. Marinarayanappa | Pruthvi Ambaar; Soumya Jaganmurthy; Raaghu Raamanakoppa; Honnavalli Krishna | Pentrix Entertainments | |
| S E P T E M B E R | 6 | Anna | Islauddin N. S. | Sampath Maitreya; Nandan G. M.; Padmashree C. R.; Bala Rajwadi | Metaphysical Films | |
| S E P T E M B E R | 12 | Ronny | Gurutej Shetty | Kiran Raj; Samiksha; Apurva; Raadhya; P. Ravishankar | Star Creations | |
| S E P T E M B E R | 13 | Kaalapatthar | Vikky Varun | Vicky Varun; Dhanya Ramkumar; Achyuth Kumar; T. S. Nagabharana | Bhuvan Films | |
| S E P T E M B E R | 13 | Kaljiga | Suman Suvarna | Sushmitha Bhat; Arjun Kapikad; Gopinath Bhat; Slagha Saligrama | Himani Films | |
| S E P T E M B E R | 13 | Life Of Mrudula | Chetan Triven | Poojashri Lokapur; Asha Sujay; Madhan Kumar C. | Madhan Movies; Devagange Frames Productions | |
| S E P T E M B E R | 13 | Shalivahana Shakhe | Girish G. | Girish G.; Sundar Veena; Supritha Satyanarayanan; Chillar Manju | Sidewings Cinema | |
| S E P T E M B E R | 13 | Vikaasaparva | K. Anbu Aras | Rohith Nagesh; Swathi H. V.; Ashwin Hassan; Kuri Ranga; Bala Rajwadi | Keshava Productions | |
| S E P T E M B E R | 20 | Dhruvathaare | Pratheek | Pratheek; Moulya Shree; Karthik Mahesh; Ashwin Rao Pallakki; Ramesh Bhat; P. D. Sathish Chandra | GP Studios | |
| S E P T E M B E R | 20 | Hagga | Avinash N. | C. Venu; Avinash Yelandur; Anu Prabhakar; Tabla Nani; Harshika Poonacha | Vasanth Cine Creations | |
| S E P T E M B E R | 20 | Karki Nanu BA, LLB | Pavithran | Jai Prakash Reddy; Meenakshi Dinesh; Bala Rajwadi; Sadhu Kokila | Third Eye Media | |
| S E P T E M B E R | 20 | Langoti Man | Sanjotha | Dheerendra S.; Sneha Khushi; Akash Rambo; Samhita Vinya | Tanu Talkies | |
| S E P T E M B E R | 20 | Rummy Aata | Umar Shariff | Raghav Surya; Sneha Rao | Eight Eagles Productions | |
| S E P T E M B E R | 27 | Kedarnath Kuri Farm | Seenu Sagar | Madenuru Manu; Shivani Amar; Tennis Krishna; Kari Subbu | J. K. Movies | |
| S E P T E M B E R | 27 | Nite Road | Gopal Halepalya | Dharma; Jyothi Rai; Renu Shikari; Girija Lokesh | Punargeetha Cinemas | |
| S E P T E M B E R | 27 | Ranaksha | K. Raghav | Seerunde Raghu; Raksha Hanumanthu; Ruhi Suryavamshi; Muni Raju | KVR Pictures | |
| S E P T E M B E R | 27 | Sanju | Yethiraj. K | Manvith Shivalingappa; Shravya Rao; Sangeetha Anil; Bala Rajwadi | Disha Enterprises | |

== October–December ==
| Opening | | Title | Director | Cast | Studio | Ref |
|---|---|---|---|---|---|---|
| O C T O B E R | 3 | Bhairadevi | Shri Jai | Radhika Kumaraswamy; Ramesh Aravind; Anu Prabhakar; Rangayana Raghu | Shamika Enterprises | |
| O C T O B E R | 4 | Gopilola | R. Ravindra | Manjunath Arasu; Nimisha K. Chandra; S. Narayan; Padma Vasanthi | Sukriti Chitralaya | |
| O C T O B E R | 4 | Janaka | Prema A | Rakshit Manoj; Suresh Babu. S | Om Shakthi Creations | |
| O C T O B E R | 4 | Minchuhulu | Kumar Mahesh | Prithviraj Rajkumar; Preetham | Bhooni Pictures | |
| O C T O B E R | 11 | Martin | A. P. Arjun | Dhruva Sarja; Vaibhavi Shandilya; Anveshi Jain; Sukrutha Wagle | Vasavi Enterprises; Uday K Mehta Productions | |
| O C T O B E R | 17 | Simharoopini | Kinnal Raj | Sagar B. R.; Yash Shetty; Ankita Gowda; Suman | Shree Chakra Films | |
| O C T O B E R | 18 | Maantrika | H. Venkatesh Rao | Vyaana Varna Jammula; Mythili Nayak; Radhika Maalipatil | Krishna Sankula Branding Pictures | |
| O C T O B E R | 18 | Murphy | B. S. Pradeep Varma | Prabhu Mundkur; Roshni Prakash; Ila Veermalla; Ashwin Rao Pallakki | Somanna Talkies; Varnasindhu Studios | |
| O C T O B E R | 18 | Prakarana Tanikha Hantadallide | Sundar. S | Mahin Kuber; Raj Gagan; Chinthan Kambanna; Mutturaj T | Karadayama Studios | |
| O C T O B E R | 25 | Ellige Payana Yavudo Daari | Kiren S. Suryaa | Abhhimanyuu Kashinath; Spoorthi Udimane; Bala Rajwadi | Sudharshana Arts | |
| O C T O B E R | 25 | Mooka Jeeva | Srinath Vasishta | Karthik Mahesh; Harsha Venkatesh; Meghashree Gowda; Apoorva Shri | AVM Entertainers | |
| O C T O B E R | 25 | Nassab | Keerthi Kumar Naik | Keerthi Kumar Naik; Shefali Singh Soni; B. Jayashree | Keerthi Creations | |
| O C T O B E R | 25 | Obbattu | Lokesh Vidhyadhar | Amith Rao; Sunanda Kalburgi; Ravi M. K. | Keerthana Movie Makers | |
| O C T O B E R | 25 | Praapthi | S. Mahesh Babu | Jayasurya Anekal; Gowri Sagar; Nikita Gowda | Sisi Creations | |
| O C T O B E R | 25 | Yala Kunni | N R Pradeep Kumar | Komal Kumar; Nisarga Appanna; H. G. Dattatreya; Sadhu Kokila; Akarsh Vajramuni; Mayur Patel | Narasimha Cinemas; Soundarya Lahari Combines | |
| O C T O B E R | 31 | Bagheera | Dr. Soori | Sriimurali; Rukmini Vasanth; Prakash Raj; Rangayana Raghu | Hombale Films | |
| N O V E M B E R | 1 | Legend Director | Naveen P B | Naveen P B; Rithya Raghavendra; Sandeep Malani; Gandharva Raj; Pranav Sathish | Navilugari Cinemas | |
| N O V E M B E R | 1 | Ugravathara | Guru Murthy | Priyanka Upendra; Suman; Ajay; Pavitra Lokesh; Nataraj Peri | SGS Creations | |
| N O V E M B E R | 8 | Asuraru | Raj Bahaddur | Rahul Gaikwad; Supritha Raj; Thammanna. K; Thippanna T. S. | Rajbahaddur Film Factory | |
| N O V E M B E R | 8 | Behind The Scenes (BTS) | Sai Srinidhi | Jahangeer Ninasam; Vijaykrishna; Medini Kelamane; Koushik Gowda | Satoir | |
| N O V E M B E R | 8 | Santhosha Sangeetha | Siddu S | Arnav Vinay; Rani Varad; Nakshatra Naina; Avinash; Doddanna | S Square Enterprises | |
| N O V E M B E R | 8 | U235 | Channegowda C. N. | Devaraj; Rajesh Nataranga; Rajesh Dhruva; Aruna Balraj; Dinesh Mangalore | Geetha Creations | |
| N O V E M B E R | 15 | Bhairathi Ranagal | Narthan | Shiva Rajkumar; Rukmini Vasanth; Shabeer Kallarakkal; Rahul Bose; Chaya Singh | Geeta Pictures | |
| N O V E M B E R | 15 | Tarakeshwara | Purushottham Omkarswamy | Ganesh Rao; Raksha Gowda; Roopali S. Doddamani; Vikram Soori; Ruthu Sparsha | GR Films | |
| N O V E M B E R | 21 | Anshu | M. C. Channakeshava | Nisha Ravikrishnan | Grahana Films | |
| N O V E M B E R | 22 | Aaraam Arvind Swamy | Abhishek Shetty | Aniish; Milana Nagaraj; Hrithika Srinivasan; Achyuth Kumar; Gowrav Shetty | 786films Aiikya Studios | |
| N O V E M B E R | 22 | Dvija | Giri H. L. | Laddu Gopal; Srushti Raghavendra; Manisha Bhatt; Dilip Kumar | Desireless Productions | |
| N O V E M B E R | 22 | Love Reddy | Smaran Reddy | Anjan Ramachendra; Shravani Reddy; Ravi Kalabrahma; Ganesh D. S.; Vani Gowda | Geetansh Productions | |
| N O V E M B E R | 22 | Maryade Prashne | Nagaraj Somayaji | Rakesh Adiga; Sunil Raoh; Shine Shetty; Prabhu Mundkur; Teju Belawadi; Poornachandra Mysore | Sakkath Studio; UVG Studios | |
| N O V E M B E R | 22 | Prabhutva | Meghadahalli. M | Chetan Chandra; Paavana Gowda; Adi Lokesh; Shashikumar; Ambika | Megharaj Movies | |
| N O V E M B E R | 22 | Tenant | Sridhar Shastri | Dharma Keerthiraj; Sonu Gowda; Thilak Shekar; Ugramm Manju; Rakesh Maiya | Master's Choice Creations; Dizital Dreamz | |
| N O V E M B E R | 28 | Anaatha | Annaseit K. A. | Sri Indra; Nikitha Swamy; Yukta Pervi; Honnavalli Krishna | Gonendra Films | |
| N O V E M B E R | 29 | Jalandhara | Vishnu Prasanna | Pramod Shetty; Rushika Raj; Bala Rajwadi; Arohitha Gowda | StepUp Pictures | |
| N O V E M B E R | 29 | Luck | Harish Foxy | Manjunath K. N.; Kaddipudi Chandru; Priya D. V.; Padmaja Rao; Ravi Mandya | Smile Films | |
| N O V E M B E R | 29 | Megha | Charan H. R. | Kiran Raj; Kaajal Kunder; Rajesh Nataranga; Shobaraj | Krushi Productions | |
| N O V E M B E R | 29 | Naa Ninna Bidalare | Naveen G. S. | Panchi S; Ambali Bharathi; K. S. Sridhar; Harini Shreekanth; Srinivas Prabhu | Kamala Uma Bhaarathi Productions | |
| N O V E M B E R | 29 | Thamate | Mayur Patel | Madan Patel; Vinaya Prasad; Vanishree; Tennis Krishna; Ramesh Bhat | Sri Renuka Yallamma Devi Creations | |
| D E C E M B E R | 5 | Haridasara Dinachari | Girish Nagaraja | Dr. Vidyabhushana; Gokul Iyer; Ghanashyama K. V. | Karigiri Films | |
| D E C E M B E R | 6 | Dheera Bhagat Roy | Karnan. S | Rakesh Dalawai; Sucharitha Sahayaraj; Sharath Lohitashwa; Ninasam Ashwath | White Lotus Entertainment | |
| D E C E M B E R | 6 | Gumti | Sandesh Shetty | Sandesh Shetty; Vaishnavi Nadig; Ranjan Chatrapati; Karan Kundar | Tasmay Productions | |
| D E C E M B E R | 20 | UI | Upendra | Upendra; Reeshma Nanaiah; Murali Sharma; Sunny Leone; Nidhi Subbaiah; Sadhu Kokila | Lahari Films; Venus Entertainers | |
| D E C E M B E R | 25 | Max | Vijay Karthikeyaa | Kiccha Sudeepa; Varalaxmi Sarathkumar; Samyukta Hornad; Sukrutha Wagle | V Creations; Kichcha Creatiions | |
| D E C E M B E R | 27 | Out of Syllabus | Pradeep Doddaiah | Pradeep Doddaiah; Achyuth Kumar; Hrithika Srinivas; Yogaraj Bhat | AD6 Entertainment | |

== See also ==
- List of Kannada films of 2023
- List of Kannada films of 2025
- List of Kannada films
