= Backbench (disambiguation) =

A backbench, in the Westminster parliamentary system, is any bench behind the frontbenches which are occupied by members of parliament (backbenchers) who are not cabinet ministers, shadow cabinet ministers, party leaders etc.

Backbench or backbencher may also refer to:

- Backbench (comics), a Canadian political comic strip
- Backbencher (magazine), Indian youth magazine
- Backbencher (radio drama), a Canadian radio drama
- Back Benchers, an Indian celebrity quiz show hosted by Farah Khan
- Back Bencherz, a 2024 Indian comedy drama film
- The Backbenchers: The Missed Call, a 2012 novel by Nikita Singh

== See also ==
- Backbench Student, a 2013 Indian film
