= Bala Rajwadi =

Indian actor

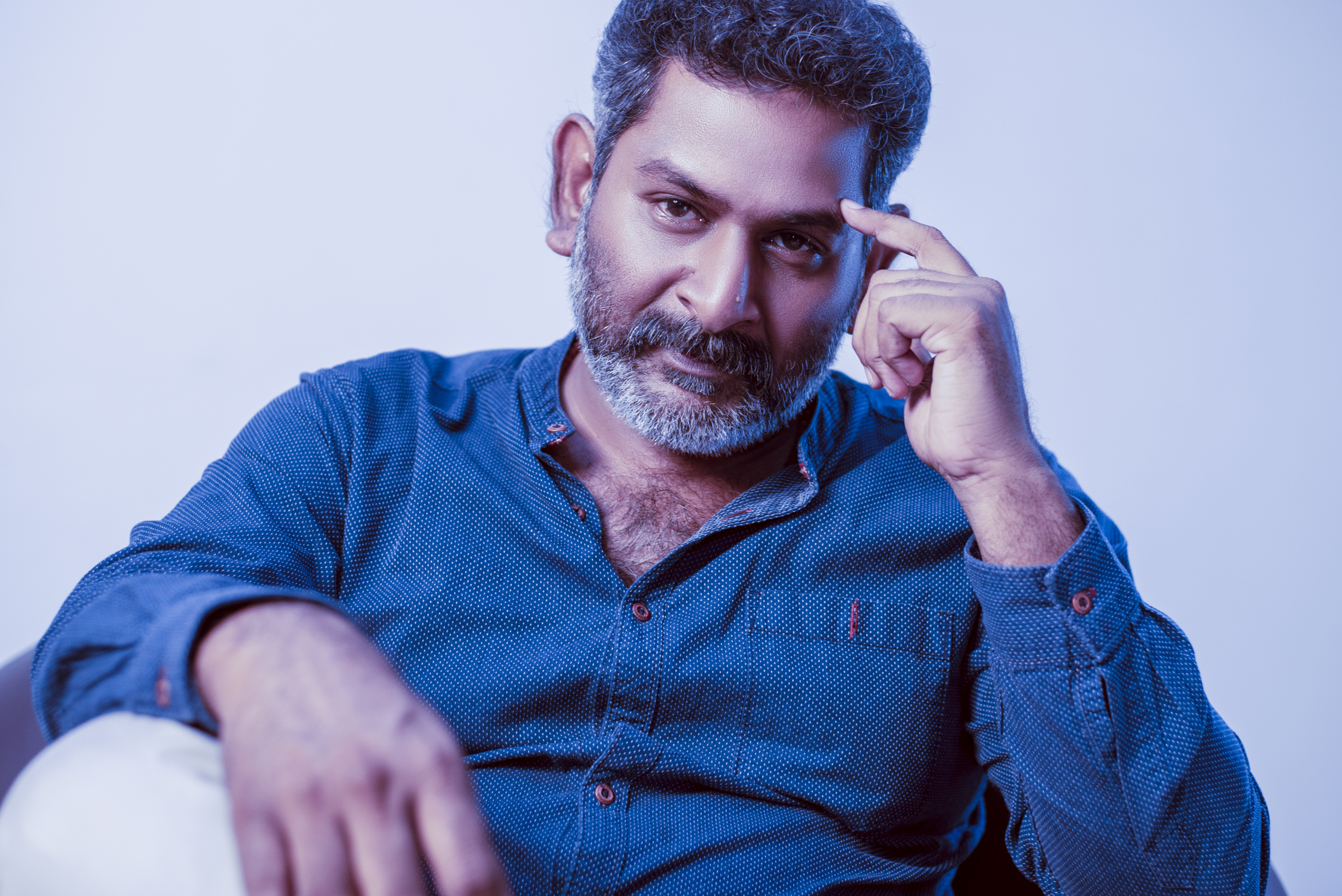
- Occupation: Actor
- Years active: 1997; 2016–present

R Lingaraju (born 27 October 1973), known by his screen name Bala Rajwadi, is an Indian film and stage actor and director known for his work in Kannada cinema. Portraying mostly negative-shaded characters, he has appeared in over 90 films.

== Career ==
Prior to acting in films, he worked as a stage actor with the theatre group called Janamana, from 1993. He has directed various documentaries and stage plays. He made his debut in the 1997 Kannada movie Nodu Baa Nammoora. Since 2016 he has been actively working in the Kannada film industry.

Rajwadi got his major break in films after appearing as an antagonist in Bhairava Geetha (2018) which was a Ram Gopal Varma production. He is also noted for his performances in films like Mufti (2017), Bharaate, Panchatantra, Damayanthi. He is the founding Member of the Niranthara foundation (established in the year 1999), a theatre group which aims to use theatre to address various social issues.

== Filmography ==
- Nodu Baa Nammoora (1997)
- Suli (2016)
- Palllata (2016)
- Vardhan (2017)
- Mass Leader (2017)
- Kataka (2017)
- Kariya 2 (2017)
- Once More Kaurava (2017)
- Nanna Magale Heroine (2017)
- Mufti (2017)
- Samhaara (2018)
- Idam Premam Jeevanam (2018)
- Dhwaja (2018)
- Bhairava Geetha (2018) (Telugu and Kannada)
- Vajra (2018)
- My Story (2018) (Malayalam)
- Fortuner (2019)
- Ravi History (2019)
- Prayanikara Gamanakke (2019)
- Panchatantra (2019)
- Anushka (2019)
- Haftha (2019)
- Bharaate (2019)
- Damayanthi (2019)
- Geetha (2019)
- Baddi Magan Lifu (2019)
- Navarathna (2019)
- Yellow Gangs (2022)
- Dharani Mandala Madhyadolage (2022)
- Long Drive (2023)
- SLV: Siri Lambodara Vivaha (2023)
- Melody Drama (2023)
- Namasthe Ghost (2023)
- Case of Kondana (2024)
- Naguvina Hoogala Mele (2024)
- Hide and Seek (2024)
- Appa I Love You (2024)
- Night Curfew (2024)
- Marigold (2024)
- Kaagada (2024)
- Pepe (2024)
- Karki Nanu BA, LLB (2024)
- FIR 6 to 6 (2025)
- Kothalavadi (2025)
- Kantara: Chapter 1 (2025)
- Surya: The Power of Love (2026)
- Karikaada (2026)
- Daiva (2026)
- Vidhi (2026)
- Kendada Seragu (2026)
- Bengaluru Inn (2026)
- Aa Ondu Notu (2026)
- Shikhandi (2026)
- Alexander (2026)
- Dodmansa (2026)
- Urabba (2026)
- Graamaayana (2026)
- Rakky (2026)
- Common Man (2026)
- Warrior (2026)
