= Swapna Mantapa =

2025 Indian Kannada-language drama film

- Theatrical release poster
- Directed by: Baraguru Ramachandrappa
- Written by: Baraguru Ramachandrappa
- Produced by: A M Babu
- Starring: Vijay Raghavendra; Ranjani Raghavan
- Cinematography: Nagaraj Adavani
- Edited by: Suresh Urs
- Music by: Shamitha Malnad
- Production company: Malai Madeshwara Enterprises
- Distributed by: Mars Distributors
- Release date: 25 July 2025
- Running time: 132 minutes
- Country: India
- Language: Kannada

Swapna Mantapa (transl. Dream Pavilion) is a 2025 Indian Kannada-language historical drama film directed by Baraguru Ramachandrappa and produced by A. M. Babu under the banner Malai Mahadeshwara Enterprises. The film stars Vijay Raghavendra and Ranjani Raghavan in dual roles, alongside Ambarish Sarangi, Rajini Gowda, Sundar Raj, and Shobha Raghavendra in pivotal parts. The music is composed by Shamitha Malnad, with cinematography by Nagaraj Adavani and editing by Suresh Urs.

It was released theatrically on 25 July 2025 with a runtime of 132 minutes.

== Plot summary ==
Manjula (Ranjani Raghavan), a high school social studies teacher, arrives in a remote village and becomes intrigued by the ruins of Swapna Mantapa, an ancient structure steeped in legend. While staying at Sidappa's (Sundar Raj) house, she meets Shivakumar (Vijay Raghavendra), an unemployed history graduate. Shivakumar narrates the tale of King Chanderaya, his queens Nagaladevi and Madanike, and daughter Madalase. As Manjula imagines herself as Madanike, the lines between past and present blur. The duo faces opposition from Bheemaraju (Ambarish Sarangi), who plans to sell the site to resort developers, and encounters Rajkumari (Rajini Gowda), a mentally unstable woman. Together, they fight to preserve the monument as a cultural legacy.

== Cast ==
- Vijay Raghavendra as Shivakumar / King Chanderaya
- Ranjani Raghavan as Manjula / Madanike
- Ambarish Sarangi as Bheemaraju
- Rajini Gowda as Rajkumari
- Sundar Raj as Sidappa
- Shobha Raghavendra
- Mahaalakshmi TR
- Sundararaja Urs
- Rajappa Dalawayi
- Mysore Manjula
- Ummatthuru Basavaraju
- Venkataraju
- Shivalinga Prasad
- Bharathi Ramesh
- Gundi Ramesh

== Production ==
The film was produced under Malai Mahadeshwara Enterprises with an estimated budget of ₹4 crore. It emphasizes heritage conservation and draws inspiration from Ramachandrappa's own novel. Ramachandrappa wrote the screenplay, dialogues, and lyrics, adapting his novel into a film.

=== Filming ===
Principal photography and dubbing were completed by mid-2024. The shoot took place in a village near Kanakapura Road, Karnataka, with elaborate sets designed by Hosamane Murthy to recreate historical aesthetics.

=== Marketing ===
The film's teaser and songs were released on social media and YouTube under the Jhankar Music label. Vijay Raghavendra also sang one track, which was highlighted during promotions.

== Soundtrack ==
Swapna Mantapa

Soundtrack album by Shamitha Malnad
- Released: 2025
- Recorded: 2024
- Genre: Feature film soundtrack
- Language: Kannada
- Producer: Shamitha Malnad

The music and background score of the film is composed by Shamitha Malnad with lyrics by Baraguru Ramachandrappa. The soundtrack was launched under Jhankar Music label.

Track listing
No.	Title	Lyrics	Singer(s)	Length
1.	"Ibbara Manasali"	Baraguru Ramachandrappa	Shamitha Malnad
2.	"Premave Premave"	Baraguru Ramachandrappa	Hemanth Kumar, Amulya Mysore
3.	"Kannada Naadu"	Baraguru Ramachandrappa	Vijay Raghavendra
4.	"Banniri Banniri"	Baraguru Ramachandrappa	Mohan Kumar

== Release ==
The film was released theatrically on 25 July 2025 across Karnataka with a U/A certification.

== Reception ==
The Times of India rated the film 2/5 stars, praising its noble message but criticizing its dated execution and slow pacing. Prajavani noted that the film feels like a stage play, with theatrical storytelling overshadowing cinematic appeal.
