= Chitkala Biradar =

Indian actress

- Born: Gulbarga, Karnataka, India
- Occupations: Stage Artist & Actress
- Known for: Kannadathi
- Spouse: Jagadeesh Jirgi
- Children: 2

Chitkala Biradar is an Indian stage artist and actress who predominantly works in Kannada language movies and serials. She is best known for her performance in the serial Kannadathi as Rathnamala.

== Career ==
She is an English graduate from Gulbarga University. She worked as an English teacher. Later she also worked as an English teacher in Germany also. Due to pressure from actress Sundarashree she came into the Kannada industry from the teleserial Bande Baratava Kala.

== Filmography ==
Year	Film	Role
2002	Dharma Devathe	
2011	Maduve Mane	
2017	Nuggekai	
2017	Enendu Hesaridali	
2019	Hagalu Kanasu	
2019	Bazaar	
2020	Maduve Madri Sari Hogtane	
2021	Yuvarathnaa	
2021	Steel Patre Samanu	
2021	Ninna Sanihake	
2021	Premam Poojyam	
2022	Vikrant Rona	Baby Ballal
2022	Vishnu Priya	
2023	Raghavendra Stores	Alamelamma

== Television ==
Year	Serials	Role	Channel
2009–2011	Bande Baratava Kala		ETV Kannada
2013–2020	Agnisakshi	Sumathi	Colors Kannada
2015–2017	Avanu Mathe Shravani	Pushpavalli	Star Suvarna
2017–2020	Subbalakshmi Samsara		Zee Kannada
2019–2020	Arthigobba Keerthigobba		Star Suvarna
2020–2022	Kannadathi	Rathnamala	Colors Kannada
2021	Manasaare	Damayanthi	Udaya TV
2023–2024	Brundavana	Sudha moorthy	Colors Kannada
2024 – present	Amruthadhare	Bhagya	Zee Kannada
