= Bharjari Gandu (2024 film) =

- Theatrical release poster
- Directed by: Prasiddh
- Written by: Prasiddh
- Produced by: Prasidda Cinemas; Madan Gowda J S; Anil Kumar D
- Starring: Kiran Raj; Yasha Shivakumar; Nisarga Lakshman; Ramesh Bhat
- Cinematography: Kitty Koushik
- Edited by: Venki UDV
- Music by: Gummineni Vijay
- Production company: Prasidda Cinemas
- Distributed by: Namana Film Distributors
- Release date: 5 April 2024
- Running time: 133 minutes
- Country: India
- Language: Kannada

Bharjari Gandu (transl. Vivacious Man) is a 2024 Indian Kannada-language romantic drama film written, directed and co-produced by Prasiddh. The film stars Kiran Raj and Yasha Shivakumar in the lead roles. The film's music is composed by Gummineni Vijay and cinematography is by Kitty Koushik.

The film went on floors in 2021 under the title Bahaddur Gandu and took three years to finally release on 5 April 2024 after changing the title. The filming took place in villages surrounding Chamarajanagar district such as Yelandur, Sathyagala and Vaddagere. Upon release, the film met with critical response from critics and failed to impress the audience.

== Premises ==
Aakash visits a village with a history of over 100 years and falls in love with Jyothi, a culturally driven girl. As he tries to resolve pressing issues like drought, the story moves from a rural setting to the city, depicting college life and romance before returning to the village. The film explores themes of rural romance, friendship, and the plight of farmers.

== Cast ==
- Kiran Raj as Aakash
- Yasha Shivakumar as Jyothi
- Nisarga Lakshman as Aishwarya
- Rakesh Raj as Raakhi
- Ramesh Bhat as Guruji/Ajjaiah
- Kari Subbu
- Veena Sundar as Akash's mother
- Nagesh Rohit as Chikka Gowda
- Govinde Gowda
- Jayashree
- Madenuru Manu
- Sourabha Kulkarni
- Manju Galipura

== Production ==
In February 2021, it was reported that director Prasiddh, who debuted with Ratnamanjarii (2019) has begun his second venture titled Bahaddur Gandu starring Kiran Raj, making his first appearance on big screen after having starred in few television series. The film was reported to go on floors from 11 March 2021. The film was announced as a tribute to the 1976's classic film of the same name starring Dr. Rajkumar. However, on 27 November 2021, it was reported that the film makers were planning to change the title so as to not rake up the grief after the demise of Puneeth Rajkumar.

== Soundtrack ==
The soundtrack was composed by Gummineni Vijay.

Track listing
No.	Title	Lyrics	Singer(s)	Length
1.	"Sukka Saarayigintha"	Chethan Kumar	Naveen Sajju, Aniruddha Shastry	4:49
2.	"Huyyo Huyyo Maleraya"	V. Nagendra Prasad	Raghu Dixit	4:13
3.	"Kaadu Kootha Chandira"	Aniruddha Shasty	Aniruddha Shastry, Aishwarya Rangarajan	4:13
4.	"Amigo Go Go"	Aniruddha Shastry	Gummineni Vijay	4:13
Total length:				17:02

== Reception ==
Y. Maheshwara Reddy of Bangalore Mirror wrote, "The movie would have been a good entertainer, if the director had ensured that that screenplay was crisp."

A. Sharadhaa of The New Indian Express rated the film 2.5 out of five stars and wrote, "'Bharjari Gandu' attempts to celebrate village community values and traditions; however, it falls short of delivering a cohesive narrative. Whether the takeaway of the film is the quaint village charm or the present reality of our own water crisis, remains unclear".
