= Rajahamsa (film) =

2017 Indian Kannada-language film

- Theatrical release poster
- Directed by: Jadesh Kumar Hampi
- Produced by: Gowrishankar SRG
- Starring: Gowrishankar SRG; Ranjani Raghavan
- Cinematography: Aroor Sudhakar
- Edited by: Venkatesh UDV
- Music by: Joshua Sridhar
- Production company: Janamana Cinemas
- Release date: 8 September 2017
- Running time: 144 minutes
- Country: India
- Language: Kannada

Rajahamsa is a 2017 Indian Kannada-language drama film directed by Jadesh Kumar Hampi. The film stars Gowrishankar SRG and Ranjani Raghavan in the lead roles. It marked Gowrishankar SRG's second film as a lead actor in Kannada cinema. The film was released on 8 September 2017.

== Plot ==
Raj a wealthy and carefree city boy. He discovers a diary belonging to a dead man falls in love with Hamsa through her writings and pursues her leading to family challenges and a rural-based romance.

== Cast ==
- Gowrishankar SRG as Raj
- Ranjani Raghavan as Hamsakshi
- Sridhar as Raj's father
- B. C. Patil
- Yamuna
- Tabla Nani
- Raju Talikote
- Bullet Prakash

== Production ==
The film was produced under the banner of Janamana Cinemas. Aroor Sudhakar handled the cinematography, while Joshua Sridhar composed the music. The film was shot in Bengaluru and Thirthahalli.

== Release ==
Rajahamsa was released theatrically on 8 September 2017.

== Soundtrack ==
Rajahamsa

Soundtrack album by Joshua Sridhar
- Released: 2017
- Genre: Feature film soundtrack
- Length: 25:59
- Label: Alpha Digitech

The soundtrack was composed by Joshua Sridhar, with lyrics written by Dhananjaya Didaga. The album was released under the Alpha Digitech label.

Track list
No.	Title	Singer(s)	Length
1.	"Janaganamana"	Raghu Dixit	4:32
2.	"Baramma Baare"	Chandan Shetty	4:27
3.	"Mula Mula"	Haricharan	3:54
4.	"Pi Pi Pi"	Santosh Hariharan, Srinivas	4:27
5.	"Budubuduke"	Srinivas	4:44
6.	"Ee Banavara"	Santosh Venky, Anuradha Bhat	3:55
Total length:			25:59

== Legacy ==
Although the film did not achieve major commercial success, Gowrishankar SRG later described it as an important milestone in his acting career. In a 2024 interview before the release of Kerebete, he said that his experience with Rajahamsa motivated him to continue despite setbacks and inspired his return as an actor and producer. The release of Kerebete also renewed media attention on Gowrishankar's earlier work, including Rajahamsa.

== Reception ==
S. Sunayana of The Times of India rated the film 2 out of 5 stars. She wrote that the film begins on a promising note with its family-oriented premise but ultimately suffers from an inconsistent screenplay and narration that fail to maintain audience engagement, despite decent performances from the cast. A mixed review by A Sharadhaa for Cinema Express found the film enjoyable despite excessive dialogues and poor editing. The film was also reviewed in the Bangalore Mirror.
