= Rakky =

2026 Indian Kannada language film

- Poster
- Directed by: Venkat Bharadwaj
- Produced by: Suresh Saligrama
- Starring: Rakky Suresh; Ashika Somashekar; Pallavi Manjunath
- Cinematography: Issac Prabhakar
- Edited by: Deepu S Kumar
- Music by: Loki Tavasya
- Production company: SNR Productions
- Release date: 10 July 2026
- Country: India
- Language: Kannada

Rakky is a 2026 Indian Kannada language film directed by Venkat Bharadwaj. The film stars Rakky Suresh, Ashika Somashekar, and Pallavi Manjunath in the lead role.

== Cast ==
- Rakky Suresh as Rakky
- Ashika Somashekarc as Suma
- Pallavi Manjunath as Siri
- Sampath Maithreya as Ganesha
- B. Suresha as Danny Don
- Bala Rajwadi as Pushkar

== Reception ==
A. Sharadhaa of The New Indian Express said that "Rakky borrows the language of an underworld drama but speaks the vocabulary of a commercial entertainer. The film eventually finds its footing, but only after raising expectations it cannot fully meet. Still, Rakky emerges with enough screen presence to leave you curious about what he does next." Susmita Sameera of The Times of India said that "As a result, the film struggles to establish a consistent tone, making it difficult to categorise. Instead, it attempts to be a little of everything." Y. Maheswara Reddy of the Bangalore Mirror said that "Music director Loki Tavasya has done a good job. The director should have ensured that the screenplay remained crisp. But if you enjoy action and suspense thrillers, do go for it."
