= Bhairava Geetha =

2018 Indian film

- Poster
- Directed by: Siddharth Thatholu
- Written by: Ram Vamsi Krishna; Ram Gopal Verma
- Screenplay by: Ram Vamsi Krishna; Ram Gopal Verma
- Produced by: Bhaskar Rashi; Ram Gopal Verma
- Starring: Dhananjay; Irra Mor; Bala Rajwadi
- Cinematography: Jagadeesh Cheekati
- Edited by: Anwar Ali
- Music by: Ravi Shankar
- Production company: Rashi Combines
- Distributed by: Jayanna Combines
- Release date: 14 December 2018
- Running time: 129 minutes
- Country: India
- Languages: Kannada; Telugu

Bhairava Geetha is a 2018 Indian Kannada-Telugu bilingual romantic action film jointly written by veteran film director Ram Gopal Verma and Ram Vamsi Krishna while directed by Siddharth Thatholu. The film is produced by Verma and Bhaskar Rashi under the production banner Rashi Combines. It stars Dhananjay and Irra Mor in the lead roles.

Ravi Shankar was roped into composing music for the film while cinematography and editing were done by Jagadeesh Cheekati and Anwar Ali, respectively. The film had its theatrical release on 14 December 2018 and opened to mixed and mostly negative reviews from critics and audiences. The story and screenplay were criticised despite a well-composed performance from Dhananjay and Irra Mor.

== Plot ==
Geetha, who belongs to a family with a hard-core faction backdrop, returns to her village after finishing her studies. She then falls in love with her father's henchman. The couple elopes when her father orders to kill Bhairava. The remaining plot of the story, including the climax, reveals how Bhairava and Geetha tackle the challenges.

== Cast ==
- Dhananjay as Bhairava
- Irra Mor as Geetha
- Bala Rajwadi as a Geetha's father, and village chieftain
- Laxman Meesala as Kunti
- Kalpa Latha as Lakshmamma

== Production ==
The film title, Bhairava Geetha, was set according to the names of the lead characters. It was officially made in Kannada-language and Telugu with the same name. This was also the 30th film to be written and produced by Ram Gopal Verma. The official trailer was released on 1 September 2018.

== Soundtrack ==
Kannada tracklist
No.	Title	Singer(s)	Length
1.	"Modala Modala Bhethiyalle"	Vijay Prakash, Shweta Mohan
2.	"Nee Nanna Bhagavathgeethe"	Vijay Yesudas, Chinmayi
3.	"Iruvi Goodnaag"	Aniruddha Sastry, Indu Nagaraj
4.	"Eno Aadhangide"	D. Sathyaprakash, Anirudha Sastry
5.	"Yee Daasyada Mushtiyu Bigiyali"	Shashank Sheshagiri, Anirudha Sastry
6.	"Appikondu Nange Jo Laali"	Mukesh

Telugu tracklist
No.	Title	Singer(s)	Length
1.	"Bhagavad Geetha"	Vijay Prakash, Sakshi Holkar	4:50
2.	"Ee Pidikili Bigiyaali"	Ramki, Asit Tripathy	3:39
3.	"Puttalona"	Asit Tripathy, Sweekar, Anjana Sowmya	4:04
4.	"Modatisaari"	Saicharan Bhaskaruni, Uma Neha	4:26
5.	"Mudduga Mosavu"	Kaala Bhairava	4:34
6.	"Edho Edho"	Arun Dev Yadav, Deepali Sathe	4:10
Total length:			25:33

== Censorship ==
The film also faced censorship issues and was supposed to be released on 21 October 2018 but was postponed to 14 December 2018. Later, it received "A" certificate from the censor board.

== Release ==
The film was released worldwide on 14 December 2018 and received mixed reviews after several postponements due to the censorship issues with the Censor Board. It was earlier scheduled to hit the screens in the box office race with 2.0 on 29 November 2018 but postponed to 7 December 2018.

== Critical reception ==
The film was released to mixed reviews. Sify gave 2 out of 5 stars, stating that the plot of the story is a shallow tale of forbidden love.
