= Warrior (2026 film) =

Kannada-language film by Umesh Hebbal

- Directed by: Umesh Hebbal
- Written by: Umesh Hebbal
- Produced by: Umesh Hebbal
- Starring: Umesh Hebbal; Bala Rajwadi; Soumya Subhash
- Cinematography: Prashanth Sagara
- Edited by: Abhilash Agnivamsha
- Music by: Pranav Rao
- Production company: V B Films
- Release date: 18 September 2026
- Country: India
- Language: Kannada

Warrior a 2026 Indian Kannada-language drama film written and directed by Umesh Hebbal. Produced by V B Films Production, the film stars Umesh Hebbal, Roy Badiger and Bala Rajwadi. It was released on 18 September 2026.

== Cast ==
- Umesh Hebbal
- Soumya Subhash
- Roy Badiger
- Bala Rajwadi
- Rohini Kashyap
- Siddu Mandya
- Harshith Gowda
- Bheeshma Ramaiah

== Production ==
The film was directed by Umesh Hebbal and produced by V B Films.

== Reception ==
Bangalore Mirror critic 2.5 "The movie focuses on the adverse impact of lust, greed and ego, and emphasises the importance of schools in rural areas." Cinema Express wrote "Warrior is a well-intentioned film that wants to speak up for farmers and rural development."
