= Hiranya (film) =

Indian action drama film

- Theatrical release poster
- Directed by: Prawin Avyukth
- Written by: Prawin Avyukth
- Produced by: Vigneshwara Gowda; Vijay Gowda Bidharahalli
- Starring: Rajavardan; Rihana; Divya Suresh; Huli Karthik; Aravind Rao; Dileep Shetty; Girish
- Cinematography: Yogeshwaran R
- Edited by: Jnaanesh B Matad
- Music by: Judah Sandhy
- Production company: Vedas Infinite Pictures
- Release date: 19 July 2024
- Country: India
- Language: Kannada

Hiranya is a 2024 Indian Kannada-language action drama film written and directed by Prawin Avyukth in his directorial debut. The film stars Rajavardan, Rihana, Divya Suresh, Huli Karthik, Aravind Rao, Dileep Shetty, and Girish.

== Cast ==
- Rajavardan as Raana
- Rihana as Abhinaya aka Abhi
- Divya Suresh as a call girl
- Huli Karthik
- Aravind Rao as Satyaprakash, Abhinaya's brother
- Dileep Shetty as Dileep Kumar

== Production ==
Prawin Avyukth, known for directing short films like Saha, Gumma, and Kalla Kannu, makes his feature film debut with this film. Prawin Avyukth's initial preference for the lead role was an actor like Darshan or Sudeepa. However, as a newcomer, he was unable to cast them, and instead opted for Rajavardan after being impressed by his performance in Bicchugatti, particularly in the film's fight sequences. In February 2022, it was announced that Rihana would play the female lead in the film, marking her Kannada debut. Principal photography was reportedly set to commence on 21 February 2022. In March 2022, it was reported that Bigg Boss Kannada season 8 fame Divya Suresh would be joining the sets from 9 March 2022. The title Hiranya was originally registered under Dhananjaya's banner, but he granted permission for Rajavardan to use it for his film. The film was primarily shot in and around Bangalore. The film's fight sequences were choreographed by Vinod and Arjun. The film was produced by Vigneshwara Gowda and Vijay Gowda Bidharahalli under the banner of Vedas Infinite Pictures.

== Soundtrack ==
Hiranya

Soundtrack album by Judah Sandhy
- Released: 2024
- Genre: Feature film soundtrack
- Length: 12:03
- Language: Kannada
- Label: MRT Music

Judah Sandhy chronology
| Not Out (2024) | Hiranya (2024) |

The soundtrack was composed by Judah Sandhy. The song "Nanagantaane" was released on 26 June 2024.

Track listing
| No. | Title | Lyrics | Singer(s) | Length |
|---|---|---|---|---|
| 1. | "Padhe Padhe" | Pramod Maravante | Sanjith Hegde | 3:29 |
| 2. | "Nanagantaane" | Pramod Maravante | Supriyaa Ram | 4:19 |
| 3. | "Baila Baila" | Prawin Avyukth | Shamitha Malnad | 4:15 |
| Total length: | | | | 12:03 |

== Release ==
The film was released theatrically on 19 July 2024.

== Reception ==
A critic from The Times of India rated the film three out of five stars and wrote that "The movie follows the usual tried and tested action film formula, but several twists keep the audience hooked to the screen." Shashiprasad SM of Times Now gave it two-and-a-half out of five stars and wrote that "It's a baby's day out but with a hitman, who first kidnaps and then does everything to save the baby. Hiranya is a one-time watch but be ready for the overloaded action and drama that comes along with it."

Y Maheswara Reddy of Bangalore Mirror wrote, "Rihana, who debuts as a heroine with this movie, has acted well. Huli Karthik and Aravind Rao have given good support. The disadvantage of the movie is too many twists and action scenes. It is worth a watch if you enjoy action films." A Sharadhaa of Cinema Express noted that "The film explores shades of good and evil while crafting a narrative that transcends mere action and inviting viewers to contemplate the transformative power of unexpected events and choices during moments of conflict".
