= Long Drive (film) =

Indian Kannada-language romantic film

- Directed by: Sri Raju G
- Written by: Sri Raju G
- Produced by: Manjunath Gowda BR
- Starring: Arjun Yogesh Raj; Supritha Sathyanarayan; Tejaswini Shekhar
- Cinematography: Kitty Koushik
- Edited by: Ramisetty Pavan
- Music by: Vikas Vassishta
- Production company: Goodwheel Production
- Distributed by: Abhijit Enterprises
- Release date: 10 February 2023
- Running time: 110.12 minutes
- Country: India
- Language: Kannada

long drive

Soundtrack album by Vikas Vasishta
- Released: 2023
- Recorded: 2022
- Genre: Feature film soundtrack
- Label: Lahari Music
External audio
- Official Audio Jukebox on YouTube

Long Drive is a 2023 Indian Kannada-language film written and directed by Sri Raju G, and produced by Manjunath Gowda BR under Goodwheel Productions. The film stars Arjun Yogesh Raj Supritha Sathyanarayan and Tejaswini Shekhar, with a music score by Vikas Vassishta. It was released in India on 10 February 2023. The Long Drive was edited by Ramisetty Pavan who edited the state award winning movie Shuddhi.

== Cast ==
- Arjun Yogesh Raj as Arjun
- Supritha Sathyanarayan as Dr Janaki
- Tejaswini Shekar as Meera
- Manjunath Gowda B.R. as Mani
- Bala Rajwadi as Bala
- Keerthi Gym as Suri
- Guru Mahesh as Shiva

== Release and reception ==
Long Drive was released on 10 February 2023 in India.

Reviewing Long Drive for The Times of India, Harish Basavarajaiah gave 3.5 out of 5 stars, praising the realism of the story.
