= Vardhan =

Vardhan is a surname. Notable people with the surname include:

- Harsh Vardhan (Delhi politician)
- Harsh Vardhan (Uttar Pradesh politician)
- Harsha Vardhan, Indian actor
- Kirti Vardhan Singh (born 1966), Indian politician
- Ranjay Vardhan (born 1969), Indian sociologist
- Vishnu Vardhan (born 1987), Indian tennis player
- Vishnuvardhan (actor) (Karnataka), Indian actor
- Vishnuvardhan (director) (born 1976), Film Director
