= Kannadathi (TV series) =

Indian television drama

- Genre: Drama
- Screenplay by: Param, Vikas Negiloni, Manjunath Bhat
- Directed by: Yashwant Pandu
- Creative director: Darshan Gowdu
- Starring: Kiran Raj; Ranjani Raghavan; Sarah Annaiah; Chitkala Biradar
- Ending theme: Siri Gannadam Gelge
- Composer: Praveen D. Rao
- Country of origin: India
- Original language: Kannada
- No. of episodes: 800

Production
- Executive producer: Srinivas
- Producer: Prakash (film director)
- Production location: Bengaluru
- Cinematography: Yogesh Gowda
- Editor: Raghu Chethan
- Camera setup: Multi-camera
- Running time: 7:30 PM
- Production company: Shri Jaimatha Combines

Original release
- Network: Colors Kannada
- Release: January 27, 2020 – February 3, 2023

Kannadathi is an Indian television drama in the Kannada language that premiered on Colors Kannada on 27 January 2020 and ended on 3 February 2023. It stars Kiran Raj, Ranjani Raghavan, Sara Annaiah and Chitkala Biradar.

== Summary ==
Bhuvaneshwari (also known as Bhuvi), a village girl from Hasirupete, goes to Bengaluru to work as a temporary lecturer to pay off her family's debts, and expects her friend Varudhini (also called Varu) to help. Varu runs a company that performs wedding ceremonies, and meets Harsha, CEO of Mala Cafe, at his cousin Adi's wedding immediately falling in love. Saniya's (Adi's fiancé) parents ask Rathnamala (Harsha's mother) who is the owner and founder of Mala School and Mala Cafe, a huge share in their property, to which she reluctantly agrees. After the wedding, Rathnamala leaves for Sigandhoor Devi Darshan on a bus that travels through her home village Hasirupete. Bhuvi, who returned to Hasirupete after she helped at Adi's wedding, finds Rathnamala injured by a snake bite. Bhuvi takes Rathnamala to her home, and she is impressed by Bhuvi's hospitality and kindness, and they become close.

Rathnamala returns to Bengaluru and offers a Kannada lecturer post to Bhuvi without the latter's knowledge. She also helps Bhuvi find a house to rent. Bhuvi and Harsha encounter each other many times; Bhuvi looks after Harsha at her home when he is sick for a few days. Rathnamala's doctor tells her that she will soon die. Rathnamala wants Harsha to marry Bhuvi; the two share a mutual attraction, but Harsha has doubts about her idealism in his practical world while Bhuvi hides her feelings by claiming they are just friends. Varudhini's desire for Harsha increases. Later, on Varu's company logo reveal day, Varu expresses that her inspiration is Harsha and hugs him; Bhuvi notices and cries. After a few days and constant meetings, Harsha realises his love for Bhuvi but decides not to confess. Bhuvi has a dream in which her father is bitten by a snake. So she decides to return to Hasirupete to visit her father; Harsha and Bindu, Bhuvi's sister accompany her. Bhuvi's father died before she arrived, and she is compelled to perform the last rites of her father; she is taunted by her step-grandmother Mangalamma. After a few days Bhuvi, Harsha and Bindu return to Bengaluru after Bhuvi rejects a local man's marriage proposal given by Mangalamma. Bhuvi and Harsha release Varu from jail which the latter ended in to prevent Harsha from going to jail due to Saniya's evil plan. Varu's proximity to Harsha makes Bhuvi sad as she thinks they love each other. Many instances come where Harsha and Bhuvi get close to each other, spend time and protect each other, but never confess their love. A few days later, Saniya taunts Harsha about his love and Varu. Harsha is shocked to know that Varu likes him, and the next day with Bhuvi's help, he tells her that he does not like her and that he treats her just as a friend. After a few days, Harsha celebrates Bhuvi's birthday in a grand way and confesses his love. Bhuvi in a shock stays silent thinking of Varu. After a few days, Harsha and Bhuvi go for a trip where Harsha is kidnapped. In fear of losing him, Bhuvi also confesses her love to him.

Mangalamma falls sick and Bhuvi goes to Hasirupete to take care of the former. In course of time, Harsha and Rathnamala visit Hasirupete. They ask Mangalamma Bhuvi's hand in marriage. After some debate about her granddaughters' (Bindu and Preethi) future, Mangalamma accepts the proposal. Harsha buys the house which Bhuvi had intended to buy earlier and registers it in her name. The engagement takes place in Hasirupete in a village style. Saniya hires a supari killer and plans to kill Bhuvi. Bhuvi becomes a victim to this but survives with injuries when Varudhini helps her. Although Varu does not want to let go of her "hero", requests Bhuvi to let her be the wedding planner to which Bhuvi agrees. While planning for the wedding and its theme, Bhuvi then wants to marry in "Kannada style" where all the ceremonies are explained in detail and the rituals are performed by knowing its importance. The wedding rituals commences. Varudhini still hopes to marry Harsha.

On the wedding day, Varudhini threatens Bhuvi for Harsha and cuts her wrist. Bhuvi takes Varu to the hospital. Due to unavailability of the auspicious hour, Bhuvi and Harsha marry in the hospital in the presence of their families and Varudhini. Bhuvi is welcomed by all in Rathnamala's house except Saniya and her father-in-law. Both constantly pick up fights with Harsha and Bhuvi in property matter, mock Bhuvi that she will soon be the owner of the whole property. One day, Rathnamala faints and enters into a coma, later dies. The whole family is shocked and in sorrow. But Saniya and her father-in-law is worried about the property inheritance and their share in it. Bhuvi learns that Rathnamala in her will had mentioned that Bhuvi (Sowparnika Nanjunda) would be the inheritor of Mala Properties and is in a dilemma as she cannot transfer her power over the property to anybody for 5 more years. Bhuvi discovers the video of Saniya trying to kill Rathnamala which was in Rathnamala's mobile phone and decides to teach Saniya a lesson.

When Adi gets to know about Saniya and her devious plan to destroy the Jaaji, he pushes her out of anger in the building. He later tries to kill himself by jumping off the building but is saved by Saniya who apologies him and Bhuvi. Varudhini tells Harsha that she loves him and wants to marry him despite he is already married to Harsha. Harsha tells her that he is only for Bhuvi.

When the Heritage Coffee Shop is inaugurated, Bhuvi is thrilled to see the project in the name of late Ammamma. While Saniya is happy with the success, Harsha can't believe Saniya has changed. Varudhini creates a ruckus to marry Harsha, but Bhuvi triggers her and explains how Varu loves Harshith. Varu changes her decision and marries Harshith. Harsha and Bhuvi spend some time, sipping coffee talking about the Heritage Coffee Shop and Ammamma's dreams. Ammamma blesses them both in her divine state. The story ends with Harsha and Bhuvi on a table, filled with joy.

== Cast ==
=== Main ===
- Ranjani Raghavan as Bhuvaneshwari (Bhuvi) / Sowparnika
- Kiran Raj as Harsha Kumar (Harsha)
- Sara Annaiah as Varudhini (Varu)
- Chitkala Biradar as Rathnamala

=== Recurring ===
- Ramola/ Arohi Naina as Saniya
- Rakshith / Vijay Siddaraj as Adithya (Adi)
- Vijay Krishna / Hemanth Kumar as Dr. Dev
- Deepashree as Dr. Tapsi
- K. Swamy as Sudarshan
- Sameksha as Prathima
- Amrutha Murthy as Suchithra (Suchi)
- Bhavish Padmajaya as Vikranth
- Mohira Acharya as Bindu
- R. T. Rama as Mangalamma (Ajji)
- Amogha as Preethi
- Hemavathi as Sahana
- Unknown as Nanjunda
- Soumya Bhat as Aashitha
- Divya Gopal as Harini
- Malini HM as Varalakshmi
- Vinay / Vishnu Narayan as Lawyer Karthik
- Asha Gowda as Sharada

=== Cameo appearances ===
- Bhavana
- Manvita Kamath
- Ananya Bhat
- Dhanush Gowda as Vijays
- Jaidev Mohan as Purushottham Hadagali
- Kavya Mahadev as Ahalya Rajguru
- Snehith Gowda as Pranam Rajguru
- Yashwanth as Charan
- Roopika as Deepika
- Kaveri Bagalakote as Seema
- Rithvik Krupakar as Ramachaari

== Production ==
Due to the COVID-19 pandemic in May 2021, shooting started in Ramoji Film City, Hyderabad, for a few episodes.

== Awards and nominations ==
Year	Award	Category	Recipient	Result
2022	9th Anubandha Awards	Jana Mechhida Samsara	Kannadathi	Won
2022	9th Anubandha Awards	Jana Mecchida Nayaki	Ranjani Raghavan	Won
2022	9th Anubandha Awards	Jana Mecchida Nayaka	Kiran Raj	Won
2022	9th Anubandha Awards	Jana Mecchida Jodi	Kiran Raj and Ranjani Raghavan	Won
2022	9th Anubandha Awards	Mane Mecchida Amma	Chitkala Birdar	Won
2022	9th Anubandha Awards	Jana Mecchida Manthare	Arohi	Nominated
2022	9th Anubandha Awards	No.1 Voot Show	Kannadathi	Won
2022	9th Anubandha Awards	Mane Mecchida sose	Ranjani Raghavan	Nominated
2022	9th Anubandha Awards	Jana mecchida style icon-Female	Sara annaiah	Nominated
2022	9th Anubandha Awards	Mane Mecchida Maga	Kiran Raj	Nominated
2022	9th Anubandha Awards	Mane Mecchida Dampathi	Kiran Raj & Ranjani raghavan	Nominated
2022	9th Anubandha Awards	Jana Mechhida Youth Icon	Kiran Raj	Nominated
2022	9th Anubandha Awards	Best Editor	Kannadathi	Won
2022	9th Anubandha Awards	Jana Mechhida Style Icon -Male	Kiran Raj	Nominated
2022	9th Anubandha Awards	Mane Mecchida Aliya	Kiran Raj	Nominated
2021	8th Anubandha Awards	Jana Mechhida Samsara	Kannadathi	Nominated
2021	8th Anubandha Awards	Jana Mecchida Nayaki	Ranjani Raghavan	Won
2021	8th Anubandha Awards	Jana Mecchida Nayaka	Kiran Raj	Won
2021	8th Anubandha Awards	Jana Mecchida Jodi	Kiran Raj and Ranjani Raghavan	Won
2021	8th Anubandha Awards	Mane Mecchida Amma	Chitkala Birdar	Won
2021	8th Anubandha Awards	Jana Mecchida Manthare	Ramola	Nominated
2021	8th Anubandha Awards	No.1 Voot Show	Kannadathi	Won
2021	8th Anubandha Awards	Jana Mecchida Hosa Parichaya	Sowparnika	Nominated
2021	8th Anubandha Awards	Mane Mechhida Atte	Sameeksha	Nominated
2021	8th Anubandha Awards	Mane Mecchida Maga	Kiran Raj	Nominated
2021	8th Anubandha Awards	Mane Mecchida Magalu	Ranjani Raghavan	Nominated
2021	8th Anubandha Awards	Jana Mecchida Style Icon - Female	Sara Annaiah	Nominated
2021	8th Anubandha Awards	Jana Mechhida Style Icon - Male	Kiran Raj	Nominated
2020	7th Anubandha Awards	Jana Mecchida Nayaki	Ranjani Raghavan	Won
2020	7th Anubandha Awards	Jana Mecchida Nayaka	Kiran Raj	Won
2020	7th Anubandha Awards	Best Director	Yashwanth Pandu	Won
2020	7th Anubandha Awards	Best Cinmatographer	Yogi	Won
2020	7th Anubandha Awards	Jana Mecchida Style Icon - Female	Sara Annaiah	Nominated
2020	7th Anubandha Awards	Jana Mecchide Style Icon - Male	Kiran Raj	Nominated
2020	7th Anubandha Awards	Jana Mecchida Youth Icon	Ranjani Raghavan	Nominated
2020	7th Anubandha Awards	Jana Mecchida Jodi	Kiran Raj and Ranjani Raghavan	Nominated
2020	7th Anubandha Awards	Jana Mecchida Mantare	Ramola	Nominated
2020	7th Anubandha Awards	Jana Mecchida Samsara	Kannadathi	Nominated
2020	7th Anubandha Awards	Mane Mecchida Mava	Sudarshan	Nominated
2020	7th Anubandha Awards	Mane Mecchida Magalu	Ranjani Raghavan	Nominated
2020	7th Anubandha Awards	Mane Mecchida Maga	Kiran Raj	Won
2020	7th Anubandha Awards	Mane Mecchida Sahodari	Monisha	Nominated
2020	7th Anubandha Awards	Mane Mecchida Sahodara	Rakshit	Nominated

== Adaptations ==
Language	Title	Original release	Network(s)	Last aired	Notes
Marathi	Bhagya Dile Tu Mala भाग्य दिले तू मला	4 April 2022	Colors Marathi	20 April 2024	Remake
