= Kshamisi Nimma Khaatheyalli Hanavilla =

Indian Kannada film

- Directed by: Vinayaka Kodsara
- Written by: Vinayaka Kodsara, Venu Hasrali
- Produced by: Silk Manju
- Starring: Diganth; Andrita Ray; Ranjani Raghavan
- Cinematography: Nandakishore Neelakanta Rao
- Edited by: Rahul
- Music by: Prajwal Pai
- Release date: 29 April 2022
- Country: India
- Language: Kannada

Kshamisi Nimma Khaatheyalli Hanavilla (transl. Sorry, there is no money in your account) is a 2022 Indian Kannada-language romantic comedy-drama directed by Vinayaka Kodsara. The cinematography is done by Nanda Kishore. The film stars Diganth, Aindrita Ray and Ranjani Raghavan. The music is composed by Prajwal Pai.

== Cast ==
- Diganth as Shankara
- Aindrita Ray as Padmavathi
- Ranjani Raghavan as Sowmya
- Vidya Murthy as Shankara's mother
- Prakash Thuminad as Bank Manager
- Umashree as Senior Lawyer (Guest appearance)
- Satish Das as debit card manager
- RaviKiran Govind bank manager

== Soundtrack ==
The soundtrack album has three singles composed by Prajwal Pai, and released on Lahari Music.

Kshamisi Nimma Khaatheyalli Hanavilla (Original Motion Picture Soundtrack)
No.	Title	Singer(s)	Length
1.	"Kannadiye"	Prajwal Pai, Aishwarya Rangarajan	3:26
2.	"Olave"	Haricharan S	3:33
3.	"Ayyo Paapa"	Ravi Mooruru, Venu Hasrali (Lyrics)	3:43

== Release and reception ==
The film was released on 29 April 2022. It was also released on Amazon Prime Video.

B Somashekar of The Times of India gave a positive review for the film, writing: "The story [,,] which doesn't have chest-thumping dialogues or mass elements, thrives solely on the content. Kudos to director Vinayaka Kodsara for taking up such a subject." A review from Udayavani appreciated the performances but felt that the film could have been better paced in the first half. On the other hand, OTT Play's Prathibha Joy criticized the film calling it "complete waste of two hours."
