= Megha (2024 film) =

- Directed by: Charan H. R.
- Written by: Charan H. R.
- Produced by: Yatheesh H. R.
- Starring: Kiran Raj; Kaajal Kunder
- Cinematography: Gautam Nayak
- Edited by: Gautam Nayak
- Music by: Joel Sakari; Franklin Rocky
- Production company: Krushi Productions
- Release date: 28 November 2024
- Country: India
- Language: Kannada

Megha is a 2024 Indian Kannada-language romantic drama film written and directed by Charan H. R. and starring Kiran Raj and Kaajal Kunder.

== Cast ==
- Kiran Raj as Megha
- Kaajal Kunder as Megha
- Rajesh Nataranga as Chandrasekhar
- Shobaraj as Jagadish
- Sangeetha
- Tharanga Vishwa
- Srividhya Shastry
- Hamsa Pratap
- Nagendra Sha as Principal
- Sunder Veena
- Rajahuli Girish
- Nagamangala Jayram
- Hanumanthe Gowda
- Saurab Kulkarni
- Dingri Naresh
- Girish Shivanna

== Reception ==
Sridevi S. of The Times of India rated the film 3/5 stars and wrote, "With universal subjects such as love and friendship, Megha shows human emotions in its pure form on the big screen". A. Sharadhaa of The New Indian Express gave the film the same rating and wrote, "Megha illustrates the importance of communication in love and relationships and explores what it means to be human—to grow, heal, and learn from the past". Y Maheswara Reddy of the Bangalore Mirror rated the film 2.5/5 stars and wrote, "Megha, a film based on a real life incident, will leave you feeling happy". Shashiprasad SM of Times Now News gave the film a rating of 3/5 stars and wrote, "Megha is a reflection on the importance of communication in relationships. It encourages viewers to reflect on their emotional connections, highlighting the power of healing and the need to confront the past to move forward".
