= Night Curfew =

- Theatrical release poster
- Directed by: Ravindra Venshi
- Written by: Ravindra Venshi
- Produced by: B S Chandrashekar
- Starring: Malashri; Ranjani Raghavan; Pramod Shetty; Sadhu Kokila
- Cinematography: Pramod Bharathiya
- Edited by: C. Ravichandran
- Music by: M. S. Maruthi
- Production company: Swarnaganga Films
- Distributed by: Radhakrishna Through Swarnaganga films
- Release date: 12 April 2024
- Running time: 127 minutes
- Country: India
- Language: Kannada
- Budget: 3.27 crores

Night Curfew is a 2024 Indian Kannada-language crime thriller film directed by Ravindra Venshi and starring Malashri and Ranjani Raghavan. The film is set during the COVID-19 pandemic curfew and was released to mixed-to-positive reviews.

== Plot ==
During a deadly pandemic gripping the world, Dr. Durga, a former army doctor, and her team battle tirelessly at a private hospital amidst strict curfews. The tension escalates when Tina's menacing husband forces the hospital to admit her, only for Tina to tragically succumb before treatment can begin. Dr. Durga senses something amiss as Raghuram and his cohorts take over, severing all communication with the outside world.

Now, Dr. Durga must protect her patients while unraveling the mystery that unfolds within the hospital's walls.

== Cast ==
- Malashri as Durga
- Ranjani Raghavan as Vedha
- Rangayana Raghu as Police Inspector
- Sadhu Kokila as Sadhu
- Sahana Shree as Ramaa
- Manju Pavagada as Mutha
- Bala Rajwadi as Devaiah
- Vardhan Theerthall as vaibhav
- Ashwin Hassan as Dinesh
- Pramod Shetty as Raghuram

== Production ==
Initially, Ravindra Venshi planned to cast veteran artist Ram Kumar's son, Dheeren Ramkumar, as the protagonist for "Night Curfew". A photoshoot was even conducted with him. However, the plan did not materialize, and later, the director decided to change the protagonist to a female role. Malashri was then chosen as the main lead for the film.

== Reception ==
A critic from The Times of India rated the film three out of five stars and wrote that "Apart from a few flaws, Night Curfew can be a good one-time watch". A Sharadhaa from The New Indian Express rated the film two-and-half out of five stars and wrote that "Night Curfew delivers what it sets out to do, even though it only holds up as a one-time watch". A critic from Times Now wrote that "Apart from Malashree and her typical on-screen action, Night Curfew is another ordinary film made against the backdrop of measures imposed to curb the spread of Coronavirus in 2021 and early 2022". Kannada daily Vijayavani wrote that excluding some dull moments, night curfew is must watch movie for thriller movie fans".
