= Bicchugatti =

2020 film by Hari Santosh

- Theatrical release poster
- Directed by: Hari Santhosh
- Screenplay by: Om Sai Krishna Productions
- Based on: Bichhugathi Baramanna Nayaka by Dr. B. L. Venu
- Produced by: S.P Gnanesh; Tejasvi
- Starring: Rajavardan; Hariprriya; Prabhakar
- Cinematography: Guru Prasanth Rai
- Edited by: Bharath Raj
- Music by: Hamsalekha; Nakul Abhyankar
- Production company: Om Sai Krishna Productions
- Distributed by: Mars Distributors
- Release date: 28 February 2020
- Running time: 141 minutes
- Country: India
- Language: Kannada

Bicchugatti: Chapter 1 − Dalvayi Dange (transl. Sword: Chapter 1 − Dalavayi Rebellion) is a 2020 Indian Kannada language historical-period film directed by Hari Santhosh and produced by Om Sai Krishna. Starring Rajavardan and Hariprriya in the lead roles, the film is based on Bichhugathi Baramanna Nayaka, a novel by Dr. B.L Venu that portrays the lives of Palegaras of Chitradurga. The supporting cast includes Kalyanee Raju, Sparsha Rekha, and Kalakeya Prabhakar. The music was composed by Hamsalekha and Nakul Abhyankar, while the cinematography was handled by Guru Prasanth Raj.

The film was released on 28 February 2020. It won Karnataka State Film Award for Best Art Direction for the year 2020.

== Cast ==
- Rajavardan as Brahamanna Nayaka
- Hariprriya as Siddhambe
- Prabhakar as Dalawayi Muddanna
- Sharath Lohitashwa as Obanna Nayaka
- Kalyanee Raju as Mallava
- Sparsha Rekha as Kanakava Nagathi

== Production ==
The film is produced by Om Sai Krishna. The film had a muhurtha on 10 December 2018 at Rockline Studios. Darshan was invited as the guest to launch the film. The movie first had Rajvardhan, who is debuting as a lead actor through this movie, on board. Later, Hariprriya was on board as the lead actress for the film. Hamsalekha was on board for scoring the music for the film after a long time. After the launch of the first look, the team got more appreciation seeking this they are planning to release the film in other South Indian languages like Tamil, Telugu, Malayalam and Hindi The film was wrapped up by 30 April 2019. The lead actors had completed their portions of dubbing by 9 September 2019.

== Music ==
The film's soundtracks were composed by Nakul Abhyankar and lyrics by V. Nagendra Prasad. The music rights were acquired by OSK Productions.

All lyrics are written by V. Nagendra Prasad.

Tack list
No.	Title	Singer(s)	Length
1.	"Dheera Sammohagaara"	Anuradha Bhat	4:06
2.	"Durgada Hebbuli"	Nakul Abhyankar	3:56
3.	"Thayi Hakki"	Nakul Abhyankar	4:11
Total length:			17:11

== Release ==
The film was released on 28 February 2020.
