= Ronny: The Ruler =

Indian Kannada-language action drama film

- Directed by: Gurutej Shetty
- Produced by: Chandrakanth Poojary; Umesh Hegde
- Starring: Kiran Raj; Samiksha; Apurva; Raadhya
- Cinematography: Raghavendra B Kolar
- Edited by: Umesh RB
- Music by: Songs: Manikanth Kadri; Score: Sachin Basrur
- Production company: Star Creations
- Release date: 12 September 2024
- Country: India
- Language: Kannada

Ronny: The Ruler is a 2024 Indian Kannada-language action drama film directed by Gurutej Shetty and starring Kiran Raj, Samiksha, Apurva, and Raadhya.

== Cast ==
- Kiran Raj as Raghava / Ronny
- Samiksha as Supreetha
- Apurva as Jhanvi
- Raadhya as Anjali
- P. Ravishankar as Kaali
- B. Suresha
- Ugramm Manju
- Ugramm Ravi
- Yash Shetty as Gowli
- Dharmanna
- Girish Hegde
- Surya Kundapur
- Kari Subbu
- Mico Nagaraj
- Pruthvi
- Arjun Palegar

== Reception ==
Sridevi S of The Times of India rated the film 2.5 out of 5 stars and wrote, "if gangster films with a bit of drama are your jam, you can give Ronny a try". A Sharadhaa of The New Indian Express gave the film the same rating and wrote, "Ronny is a whirlwind of intense action and deeply personal drama, steering through the complex terrain of redemption and self-realisation amidst a backdrop of cinematic excess. Its success lies in balancing these elements, even if the overall execution falters on occasion". Jagadish Angadi of the Deccan Herald wrote, "Despite some narrative missteps, the film’s technical merits and performances make it an average watch". Shashiprasad SM of the Times Now News rated the film 2 out of 5 stars and wrote, "The film's familiar gangster drama, while featuring some earnest performances, ultimately delivers a predictable storyline".
