= Kiran Raj =

Indian actor (born 1993)

- Born: 5 July 1993 (age 33)
- Occupations: Actor; model
- Years active: 2010–present
- Works: Tu Aashiqui (2017–18); Kannadathi (2020–23) ) Karna (2025-present)

Kiran Raj (born 5 July) is an Indian actor and model who works in Kannada and Hindi television and cinema. He is best known for portraying Harsha Kumar in the drama series Kannadathi (2020–2023). As of 2025, Raj is reported to be among the highest-paid actors in Kannada television.

== Career ==
Kiran Raj has played a background dancer in Kannada films since 2010.

As of June 2025, he is playing the titular character of a gynaecologist in Zee Kannada's Karna. The show is gaining the highest TRP ratings on Kannada television .

Following the release of Ronny: The Ruler (2024), Raj received increased attention for his performance, which contributed to his growing presence in Kannada cinema. In interviews, he stated that the film marked an important phase in his career and expressed interest in exploring a wider range of roles across different genres.

In 2021, Raj became the first Kannada television actor to trend on Google Search in India.

In 2025, Raj garnered further attention with the teaser of his upcoming film Jockey 42.

During the same period, Raj continued his work in Kannada television with Karna, which recorded high viewership ratings during its initial weeks of broadcast. In Zee Kutumba Awards 2025 , Kiran Raj Won the most Popular Actor and Popular Jodi awards for Karna.

In 2026, Kiran Raj won the Best Actor in Sitsa awards with 10M+ votes and continues to rule television and win people's heart.

== Filmography ==
Year	Film	Role	Notes
2017	March 22	Rahul	
2018	Asathoma Sadgamaya	Raghava	
2021	Jeevnane Natka Samy	Akash	
2022	Buddies	Amith	
2022	Nuvve Naa Pranam		Telugu film
2024	Bharjari Gandu	Akash	
2024	Megha	Megha	
2024	Ronny: The Ruler	Raghava / Ronny	
TBA	Jockey 42	Kiran and Raj	

== Television ==
- Yeh Rishta Kya Kehlata Hai (cameo)
- Tu Aashiqui (2017–18) as Murali "Monty" Shetty
- Life Super Guru as himself
- Devathe (2015–17)
- Chandramukhi (2020) as Rakesh
- Kinnari (2020) as Nakul (replaced by Pavan Kumar)
- Kannadathi (2020–23) as Harsha Kumar
- Karna (2025–present) as Karna
