= Ranjani Raghavan =

Indian actress and writer

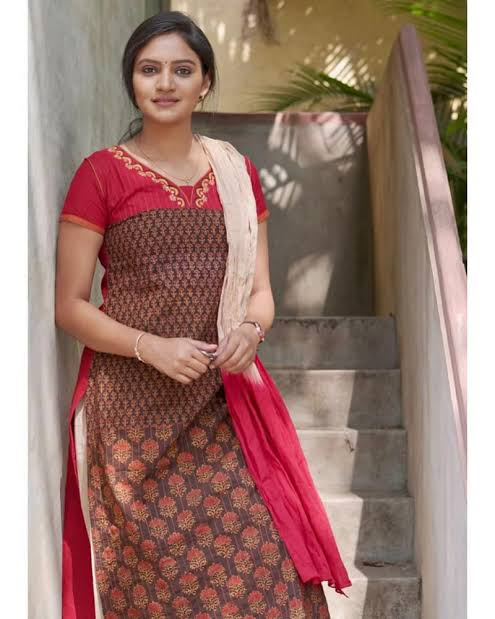
- Ranjani Raghavan
- Born: Ranjani; 29 March 1994 (age 32); Bangalore
- Education: Master of Business Administration
- Alma mater: Seshadripuram Institute of Management Studies
- Occupations: Actress, writer, creative director
- Years active: 2012–present

Ranjani Raghavan is an Indian actress and writer who primarily works in Kannada-language films and television. She gained recognition for her role as Gowri in the Kannada television series Putta Gowri Maduve.

Raghavan has also worked as a writer and creative director in television. She later appeared in the television series Kannadathi and has acted in Kannada films including Rajahamsa.

She is the author of the short-story collection Kathe Dabbi (2021) and the novel Swipe Right (2022).

== Career ==
Ranjani Raghavan began her television career as a child actor and appeared in the Kannada serial Keladi Chennamma. She later played the title role of Gowri in the Kannada television series Putta Gowri Maduve, a role that brought her wider recognition. After Putta Gowri Maduve, Raghavan worked on the Kannada serial Ishta Devathe as a creative director and scriptwriter. She also appeared in the Malayalam television series Pournami Thinkal. Raghavan made her film debut in the Kannada film Rajahamsa, directed by Jadesh Kumar Hampi. The film was released in 2017, with Raghavan playing the lead role.

In 2019, Raghavan was cast as Bhuvaneshwari, also known as Bhuvi, in the Kannada television series Kannadathi, opposite Kiran Raj. The series featured her character as a Kannada teacher, and Raghavan also discussed the Kannada terminology explained during the programme.

== Filmography ==
Year	Film	Role	Notes
2017	Rajahamsa	Hamsa	Debut film
2022	Takkar	Punya	
2022	Kshamisi Nimma Khaatheyalli Hanavilla	Soumya	
2023	Hakuna Matata	Roopa	Web series
2024	Night Curfew	Vedha	
2024	Kangaroo	Meghana	
2025	Swapna Mantapa	Manjula / Madanike	Directed by national award-winner Baraguru Ramachandrappa
2025	Sathyam†	Geetha	Telugu debut, also Kannada film
2025	Di Di Dikki†	TBA	Writer and director

== Television ==
Year	Program	Role	Language	Channel
2012	Keladi Chennamma	Nagaveni	Kannada	Star Suvarna
2012–2014	Akasha Deepa	Ammu	Kannada	Star Suvarna
2014–2018	Putta Gowri Maduve	Gowri	Kannada	Colors Kannada
2019	Pournami Thinkal	Pournami	Malayalam	Asianet
2019–2020	Ishta Devathe	Creative Director Debut, Script Writer and Co producer	Kannada	Colors Kannada
2020	Bigg Boss Kannada season 7	Guest : To promote the serial Kannadathi. Day 103	Kannada	Colors Kannada
2020–2023	Kannadathi	Bhuvaneshwari "Bhuvi"	Kannada	Colors Kannada

== Awards ==
Year	Award	Category	Nominated work	Result
2015	Anubhandha Awards	Mane Mecchida Sose	Putta Gowri Maduve	Won
2016	Anubhandha Awards	Mane Mecchida Sose	Putta Gowri Maduve	Won
2016	Anubhandha Awards	Jana Mecchida Nayaki	Putta Gowri Maduve	Won
2017	Anubhandha Awards	Mane Mecchida Sose	Putta Gowri Maduve	Won
2018	Anubhandha Awards	Mane Mecchida Sose	Putta Gowri Maduve	Won
2018	Fashion show	Mr & Miss India Supermodel 2017	IFM Fashion show	Won
2020	Anubhandha Awards	Jana Mecchida Nayaki	Kannadathi	Won
2021	Anubhandha Awards	Jana Mecchida Jodi	Kannadathi	Won
2021	Anubhandha Awards	Jana Mecchida Nayaki	Kannadathi	Won
2021	Creator Spotlight Awards 2021	Best Social Cause Influencer	Social Cause Award	Won
2022	RotaryClub Bangalore	Youth Icon	Award for Writing and Acting	Won
2022	Chittara Awards	Rising Star Award	For Acting	Won
2022	Anubhandha Awards	Jana Mecchida Nayaki	Kannadathi	Won
2022	Anubhandha Awards	Jana Mecchida Jodi	Kannadathi	Won
2024	Karnataka Kannada Barahagarara Mattu Prakashakara Sangha	Yuva Sahithya Ratna	Swipe Right	Won

== Writing ==
Year	Title
2021	Kathe Dabbi
2022	Swipe Right
