= Ranjay Vardhan =

Indian Sociologist (born 1969)

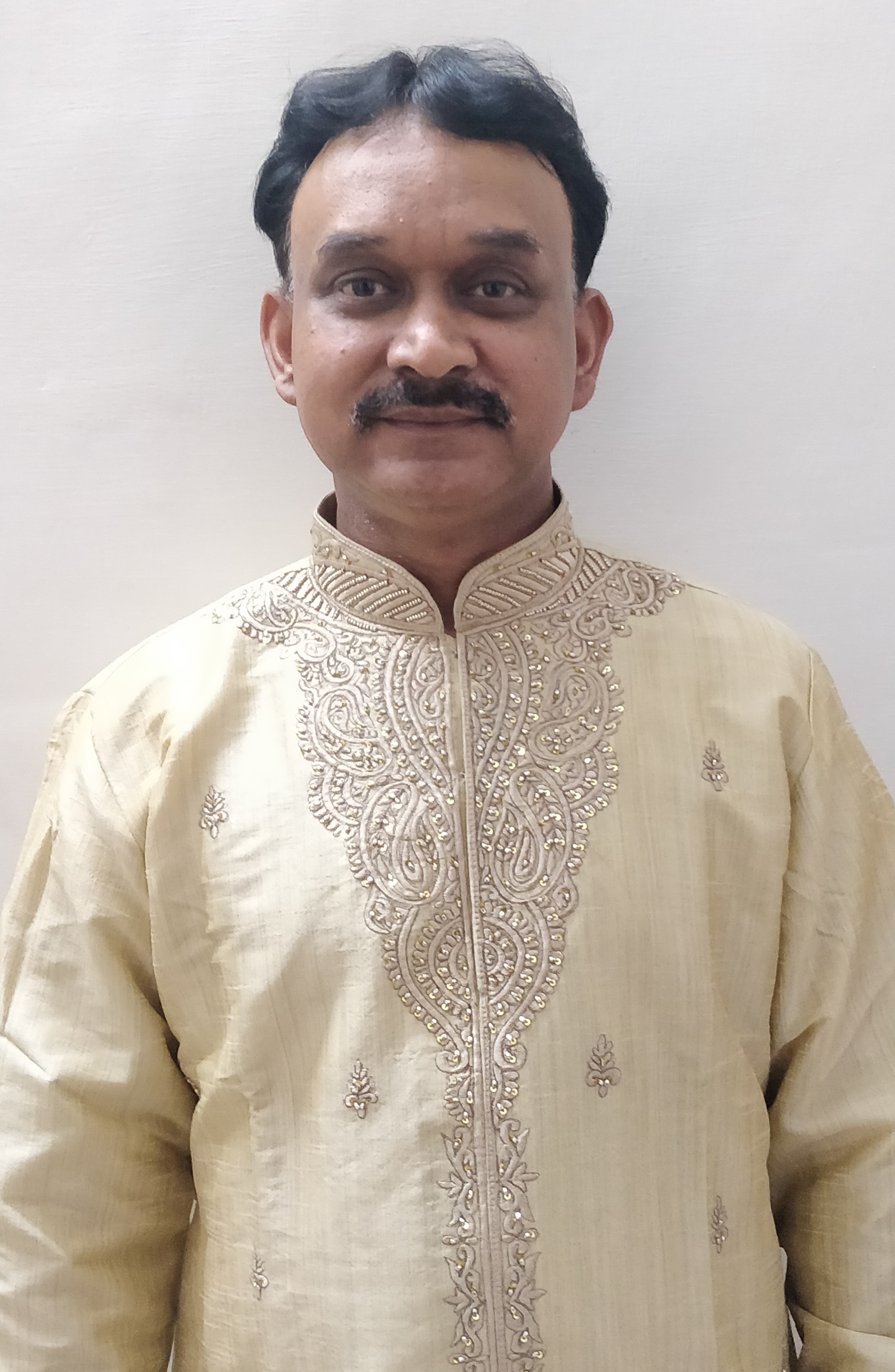
- Born: 3 May 1969 (aged 57); Chandigarh, India
- Education: Panjab University, Chandigarh
- Scientific career
- Fields: Sociology, Family and Gender Studies, Broken hearts
- Workplaces: Post Graduate Government College for Girls, Sector 42, Chandigargh

Dr Ranjay Vardhan (born 3 May 1969) is an Indian sociologist who is serving as Head, Department of Sociology at the Post Graduate Government College for Girls, Sector 42, Chandigarh. He has developed the concept of Covidalization, i.e., Covid Socialization. He has published works in the field of Family and Gender Studies and has done pioneering works in the field of broken hearts.

== Biography ==
Dr.Ranjay Vardhan studied at Chandigarh. He did his schooling From D.A.V.Senior Secondary School, Sector 8, Chandigarh and graduation from Post Graduate Govt.College, Sector 11, Chandigarh. He received his Post Graduation and Doctoral Degree in Sociology from Panjab University, Chandigarh. He was awarded University Grants Commission Senior Fellowship in July 1991 He has also completed Certificate/Diploma courses in French, German and Persian from Panjab University, Chandigarh between 1993 and 1995.

== Academic career ==
He has authored Fifteen Books, besides 30 articles in research journals and books. Chandigarh Sahitya Akademi included his works in the 'Directory of Writers'. He has been given epithets like Newton of Heartbreak, Doctor Feelgood, Doctor Rehabilitation, Dr Fixit, Mr Fixit and Dr Glue by media for his work. He has presented papers at International Conferences in Europe and Asia and has been invited to present a paper at Harvard University, USA in May 2012. He has been invited to deliver lectures and papers within India and abroad. He has presented papers at International Conference on Women in Seoul, Korea and Stockholm University, Stockholm. He has delivered extension lectures at Punjab Police Academy, Phillaur, National Institute of Nursing, P.G.I. M.E.R., Chandigarh, Department of Mass Communication, University School of Open Learning, Panjab University, Chandigarh and also at other places. He has often been quoted in newspapers and magazines as a Sociologist. His two books are included in References in Syllabus of Sociology of Panjab University, Chandigarh. His paper entitled "Elder Abuse and Elder Victimization" has been published in International Annals of Criminology, volume 55, Issue 1 May 2017, pp. 99–113 published by Cambridge University Press. His paper Crime and Abuse Against Elderly Women in India: Laws, Policies, and Need for Intervention has published in Handbook of Aging, Health and Public Policy, 2022 by Springer. His book "Covidalization: A New Concept in Social Science" has published in 2023. His concept "Covidalization" has been included in Syllabus of Panjab University, Chandigarh and other universities. He has been awarded ICSSR MajorProject of Rs 16 Lakhs and earlier he was awarded ICSSR IMPRESS Major Project of Rs. 8 Lakhs. He has been awarded Asian Admirable Achievers Award 2023 and Intellectual of The Year Award, 2024 by Rifacemento International. He was also awarded Rashtriya Gaurav Award 2023 by IIFS at India International Centre, New Delhi.

== Bibliography ==
- Female Headed Households in Patriarchal Society: A Sociological Study", 1999, ISBN 978-81-7341-001-7
- Coping with Broken Hearts- World's First Complete Self-Help Book for Broken Hearts, 2007, ISBN 978-81-7341-445-9
- Single Women: A Study of Spinsters, 2008, Indian Publishers Distributors, Delhi, India, ISBN 978-81-7341-453-4
- European Union Manifesto and other Essays- A model to overcome recession and making a new world order, 2009, Indian Publishers Distributors, Delhi, India
- Ranjikayen- A collection of Poems, 2002, ISBN 978-81-7341-267-7
- Co-author of Book "Changing Face of Education: A New Perspective", Indian Publishers Distributors, Delhi, India, ISBN 978-81-7341-478-7
- Information Communication Technology and Gender, 2012, Indian Publishers Distributors, Delhi, India, ISBN 978-81-7341-494-7
- Co-Editor "Indian Women: Issues and Perspectives", 2012, Indian Publishers Distributors, Delhi, India, ISBN 978-81-7341-493-0
- Essentials of Sociology", 2017, New Academic Publishing Co., Jalandhar, ISBN 978-93-82052-37-1
- Rural Sociology, 2021, New Academic Publishing Co., Jalandhar, ISBN 81-87476-64-8
- Covidalization: Covid Socialization A New Concept in Social Science, 2023, Mohindra Publishing House, Chandigarh ISBN 978-93-90758-53-1
