= Backbench (comics) =

Canadian comic strip

Backbench was a panel cartoon appearing in The Globe and Mail. The strip was written and drawn by Graham Harrop. It consisted of multiple- and single-panel jokes, generally drawn from and satirizing Canadian politics. Graham Harrop also has an editorial cartoon in The Vancouver Sun three days a weeks as well as publishing books and cards for special occasions. His award-winning comic strip Ten Cats appears daily online at Gocomics.
