= Kaagada =

2024 Indian romantic drama film

- Theatrical release poster
- Directed by: Ranjith Kumar Gowda
- Written by: Ranjith Kumar Gowda
- Produced by: Arun Kumar A
- Starring: Adithya; Ankita Jayaram; Neha Patil; Bala Rajwadi
- Cinematography: Venus Nagraj Murthy
- Edited by: Pavan Gowda
- Music by: S. Pradeep Varma
- Production company: Amma Cine Creations
- Release date: 5 July 2024
- Running time: 149 minutes
- Country: India
- Language: Kannada

Kaagada (transl. Letter) is a 2024 Indian Kannada-language romantic drama film written and directed by Ranjith Kumar Gowda. The film stars Adithya, Ankita Jayaram, Neha Patil, and Bala Rajwadi.

The film follows the interfaith romance between Shivu, a Hindu boy, and Ayesha, a Muslim girl from a rival village. The story is set in a 2005 rural backdrop. They use letters as their way to communicate.

Kaagada was released on 5 July 2024.

== Cast ==
- Adithya as Shivu
- Ankita Jayaram as Ayesha
- Neha Patil
- Bala Rajwadi

== Production ==
This film is the second film of the director Ranjith Kumar Gowda, who earlier directed Apple Cake (2018). Ankita Jayaram, who is known as a child artist for acting in the TV series Bhoomige Bandha Bhagavantha, makes her debut as a lead actress with this film. Aditya makes his debut, having previously featured in a few short films. The cinematography was by Venus Nagraj Murthy, and the editing was handled by Pavan Gowda.

== Soundtrack ==
The soundtrack of the film was composed by S. Pradeep Varma.

Track listing
No.	Title	Lyrics	Singer(s)	Length
1.	"Howda Irabahuda"	V. Nagendra Prasad	Chethan Naik	4:00
2.	"Alla Subhanalla"	V. Nagendra Prasad	Harsha Ranjani	3:08
3.	"Padagale Irada"	V. Nagendra Prasad	G. Kalyan, Arpitha Venu	4:15
4.	"Kaagada Kaagada"	Sandeep Kumar	Chinmai Athreyas, Sandeep Kumar	2:16
Total length:				13:39

== Reception ==
Y. Maheswara Reddy of Bangalore Mirror rated the film three out of five stars and wrote that "Had the director reduced the run time of the movie by 10 to 15 minutes, the movie would have been a good entertainer. It is worth a watch for family audiences." Shashiprasad SM of the Times Now gave it two-and-a-half out of five stars and wrote, "Kaagada is not spectacularly different from earlier films on the same topic, the rural drama, wrapped in an adorable teenage love story with a purpose, makes Kaagada a one-time watch."

A Sharadhaa of Cinema Express gave it two-and-a-half out of five stars and wrote, "The film treads a familiar path but can still be considered a one-time viewing experience, as it evokes a nostalgic charm reminiscent of old-school romance where games like FLAMES measured love." A critic from Udayavani gave the film a positive review and wrote that the team has tried to leave the regular aspects of the Hindu-Muslim love story and tell something new.
