= Urabba =

2026 Indian Kannada language film

- Poster
- Directed by: Shankar Lucky
- Starring: Naresh Gowda; Tanisha Kuppanda
- Release date: 19 June 2026
- Country: India
- Language: Kannada

Urabba is a 2026 Indian Kannada language film directed by Shankar Lucky. The film stars Naresh Gowda, and Tanisha Kuppanda in the lead role.

== Cast ==
- Naresh Gowda
- Tanisha Kuppanda
- Payal Chengappa
- Mithra
- Siddu Moolimani
- Arvind Rao
- Biradar

== Reception ==
Susmita Sameera of The Times of India said that "Urabba succeeds in what appears to be its primary objective: capturing the essence of a living tradition with sincerity and respect. Though not exceptional as a drama, Urabba stands out as an honest and heartfelt tribute to community, heritage, and the enduring spirit of celebration." Y. Maheswara Reddy of the Bangalore Mirror said that "Naresh Gowda has acted well and also ensured other actors get sufficient screen space. The film is a good watch if you want to see the Sri Ujjani Chowdeshwari Fair up close." Asianet News said that "Urabba' successfully brings alive the culture and rituals of a village festival. This is a worthy one-time watch for movie lovers who enjoy rural flavors and distinct storytelling." Cineduniya praised the film's depiction of the Ujjani festival and its portrayal of cultural diversity and brotherhood. Manjuraj Surya of Daily News Karnataka rated the film 3/5 stars and praised its portrayal of the Ujjani festival, cinematography, music and performances.
