= Sathyagala =

- Location within Karnataka
- Coordinates: 12°14′32″N 77°08′50″E
- Country: India
- State: Karnataka
- District: Chamarajanagar
- PIN: 571440

Sathegala is a village in the southern state of Karnataka, India. It is located in the Kollegal taluk of Chamarajanagar district.

== Demographics ==
As of 2011 India census, Sathegala had a population of 13074, with 6685 males and 6389 females.

== Places of interest ==
Sathyagala attained fame due to the stay of the SriVaishnavite Guru Vedanta Desikan in the 14th century, when he had to save rare manuscripts like the Sruti-prakasha, a commentary on the Sri Bhashya of Ramanuja from the Muslim invaders to Srirangam in 1327.

There is a temple for Sri Varadharaja Swamy known as Kote Varadharaja Perumal.

Another famous and ancient temple is the Madhyarangam which has Sri Renganatha Swamy as the main Deity.

Within one furlong of the handpost junction, there are two dargah on the road to Shivanasamudram waterfalls. The first one has a decorated in the open courtyard with three surrounding building and space for devotees to take rest and have food.

The second Dargah is set in a sylvan surroundings some two furlongs from the junction on the opposite side of the street. On the right hand side of the village school, there is a tree worship temple with a big and ancient tree besides it.

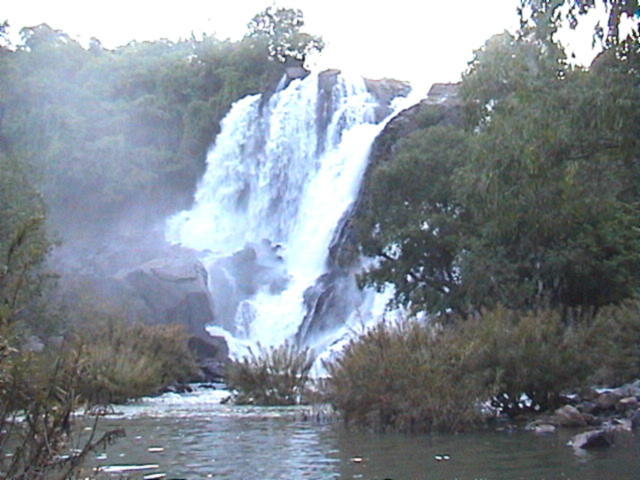
Shivanasamudra Waterfalls

1

== Nearby attractions ==
The Sivanasamudram Falls is on the Kaveri River after the river has wound its way through the rocks and ravines of the Deccan Plateau and drops off to form waterfalls.

== Schools ==
- Sathyagala School, Handpost junction.
- Government primary school, Agrahara.
- Government High school, Sathyagala.

== See also ==
- Chamarajanagar
- Districts of Karnataka

== Image Gallery ==
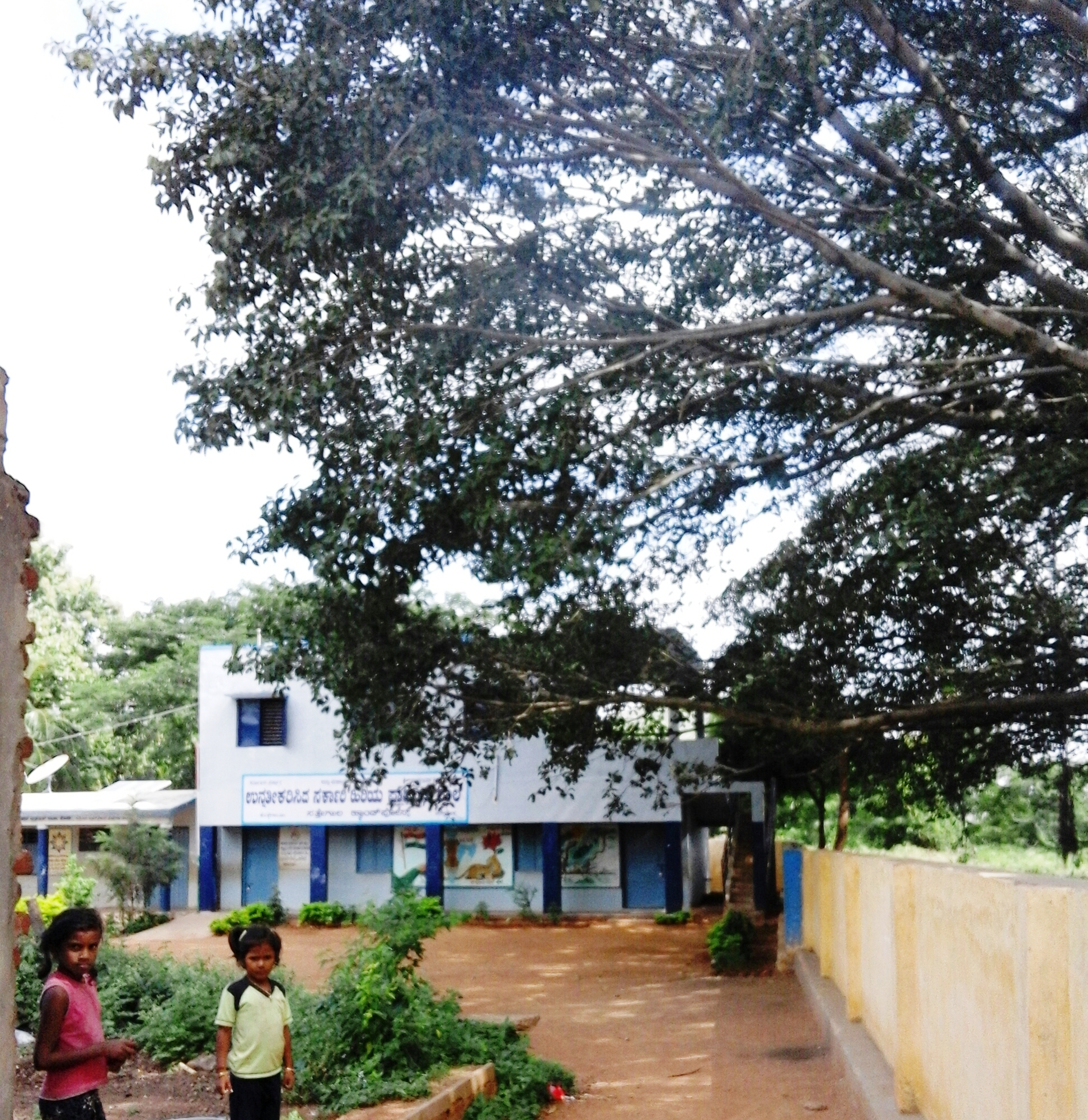
Sathyagala School

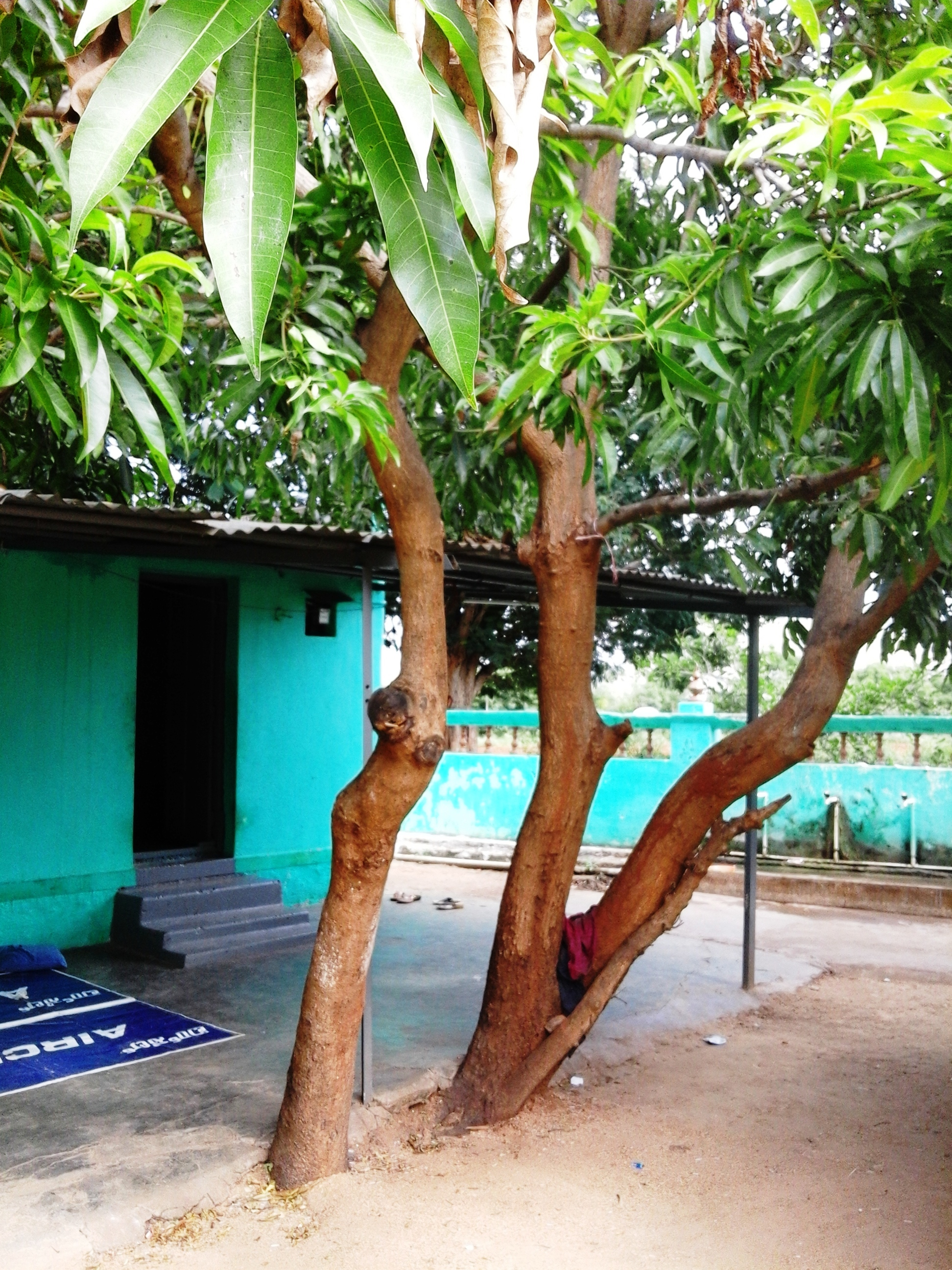
Dargah Gool rashan zameer

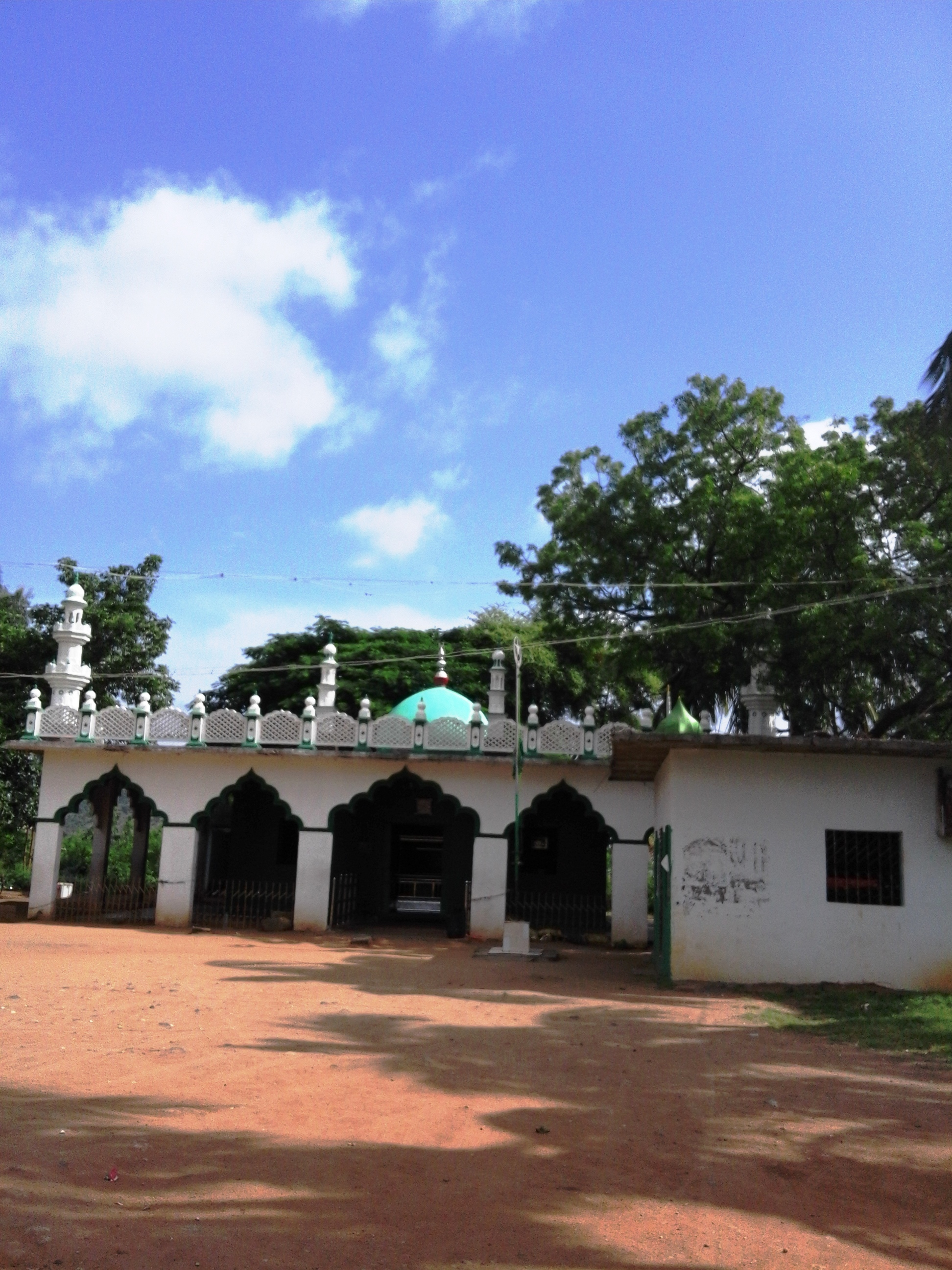
Dargah near school

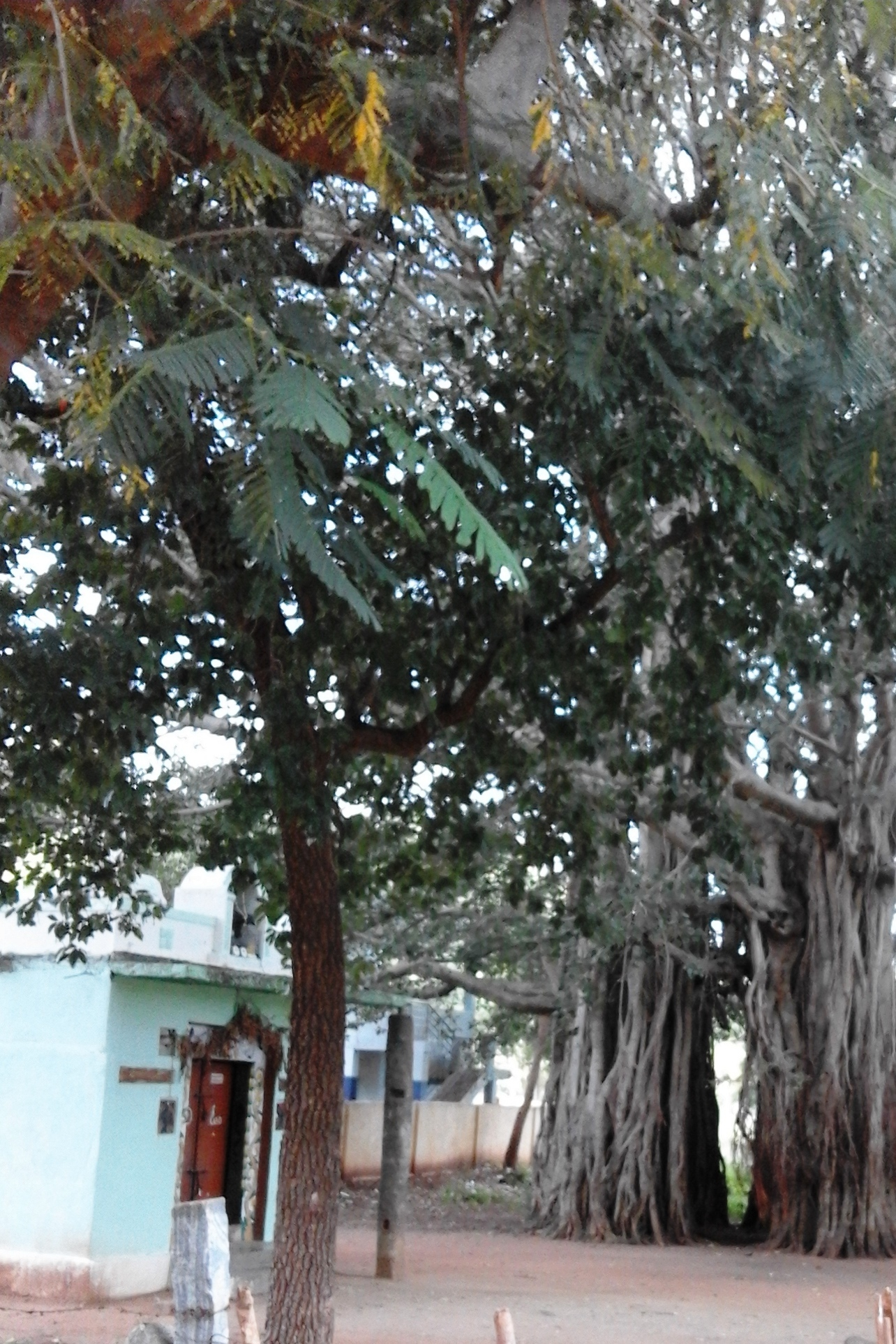
Temple near school

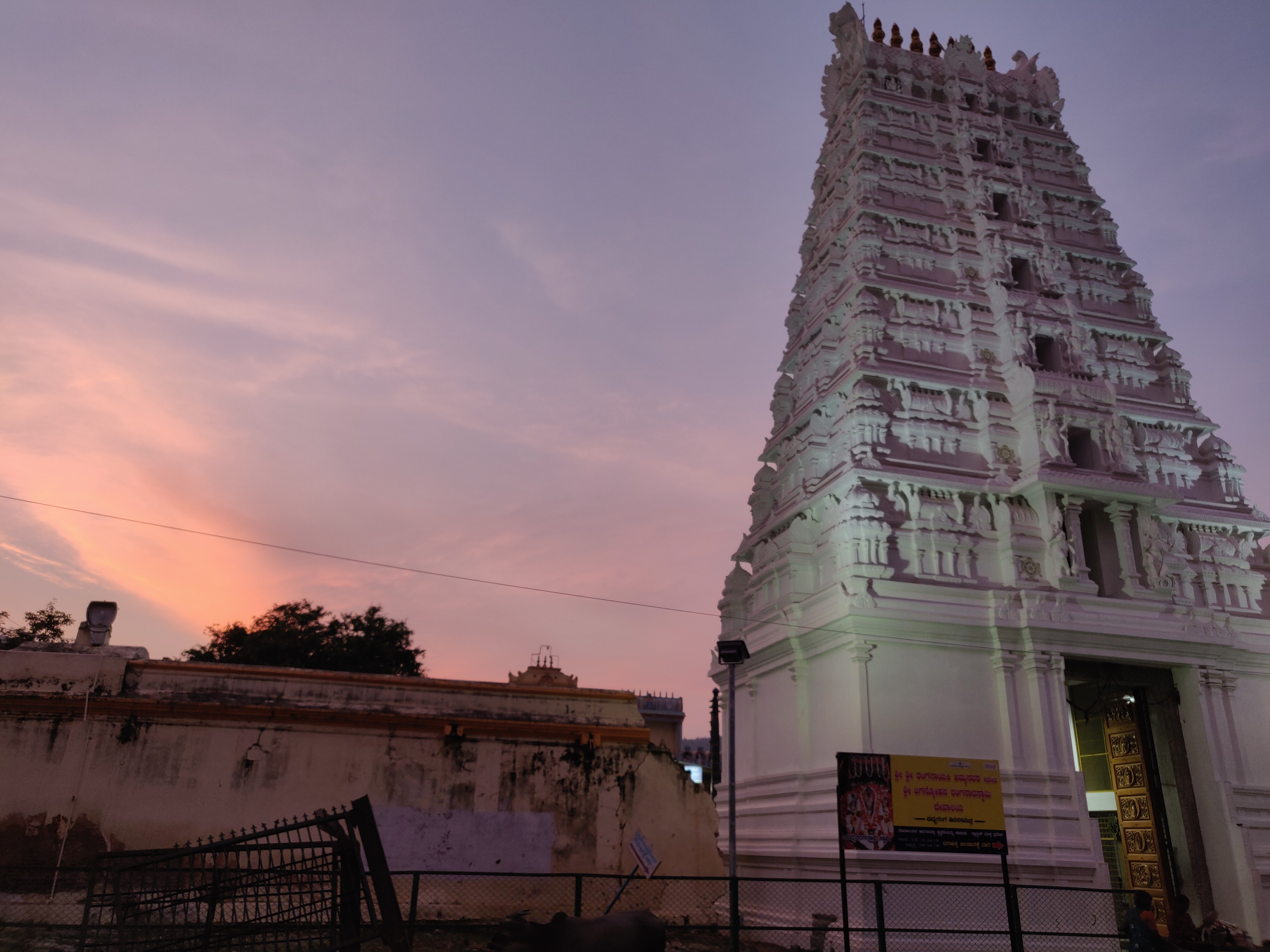
The ancient and famous Madhya Rangam Temple

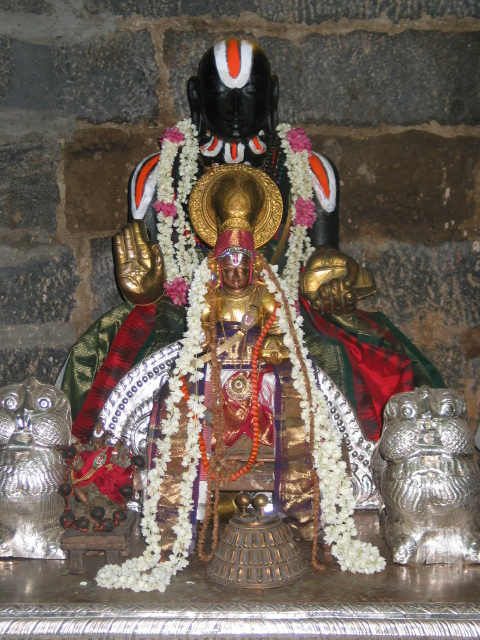
A picture of Swami Vedanta Desikan. He came to Sathyagala during the Muslim Raid in 1327 and stayed here for 12 years.
