= Pranayam (2024 film) =

- Theatrical release poster
- Directed by: S. Dattatreya
- Screenplay by: S. Dattatreya
- Story by: Paramesh
- Produced by: Paramesh
- Starring: Rajavardan; Naina Ganguly
- Cinematography: V. Nagesh Acharya
- Music by: Mano Murthy
- Production company: Mansi Ventures
- Distributed by: P2 Productions
- Release date: 9 February 2024
- Country: India
- Language: Kannada

Pranayam is a 2024 Indian Kannada-language romantic thriller film directed by S. Dattatreya and starring Rajavardan and Naina Ganguly. The film was released to mixed reviews.

== Cast ==
- Rajavardan as Gautham
- Naina Ganguly as Amrutha
- Pavan Surya

== Production ==
The film was shot in Chikkamagaluru, Shivamogga, Bengaluru and the United States.

== Soundtrack ==
The soundtrack was composed by Mano Murthy.

Track listing
No.	Title	Lyrics	Singer(s)	Length
1.	"Malegaala Bantu Saniha"	Jayanth Kaikini	Sonu Nigam	4:29
2.	"Ninage Sigalu Eedina"	Chinmay Bhavikere	Sonu Nigam	4:54
3.	"Sameepa"	Hrudaya Shiva	Kunal Ganjawala, Shreya Ghoshal	3:56
4.	"Bere Maate Illa"	Jayanth Kaikini	Hemanth Kumar, Vani Satish	4:39
5.	"Ninage Sigalu Eedina (female version)"	Chinmay Bhavikere	Shreya Ghoshal	3:32
Total length:				21:30

== Reception ==
Vinay Lokesh from The Times of India rated the film 2 1/2 out of 5 and wrote that "Pranayam is a film that begins as a romantic family drama, but turns into a thriller. However, not enough screen time has been dedicated to convince the audience of the growing bond between the couple and the transition of the storyline thereafter". A Sharadhaa from Cinema Express gave the film the same rating and wrote that "The story starts on a romantic note but doesn’t quite satisfy with its supposed twist. The ending doesn’t quite match the build-up, and it falls flat". Vinayak K.S. from Prajavani wrote that "When an unexpected twist appears in the couple's life, their ideas change, the relationship is tested. The screenplay could have been stronger at this stage".
