= Backbencher (magazine) =

Magazine published in India

- Categories: Youth magazine
- Frequency: Monthly
- Publisher: Crazy Minds
- First issue: 1 July 2014
- Country: India
- Based in: Nagpur
- Language: English
- Website: backbenchermagazine.com

Backbencher is a monthly youth magazine published in India. The magazine is published by Nagpur-based publisher Crazy Minds. Every month the magazine carries a biopic cover story of a successful person who did poorly in their studies during school or college. The goal of publishing these stories is to motivate students who do not do well in school.
