= Rajavardan =

Indian actor

- Born: 24 March 1991 (age 35); Bengaluru, India
- Other name: Raj
- Occupations: Actor, film producer
- Years active: 2020-present
- Spouse: Divya Rajavardan
- Father: Dingri Nagaraj

Rajavardan is an Indian actor, who works in Kannada cinema.

== Early life and education ==
Rajavardan was born in Bangalore, Karnataka, India to Dingri Nagaraj. He developed an early interest in performing arts, influenced by his father. He spent much of his childhood watching and participating in stage dramas. He completed his higher education in Bangalore and earned a Master of Visual Arts (MVA) degree from Karnataka Chitrakala Parishath, graduating as a top student.

Despite his academic background in visual arts, Rajavardan had a strong desire to act. He actively participated in theatre groups in Bangalore, joining several stage productions and gaining hands on experience in performance.

== Acting career ==
Rajavardan gained recognition with the historical period film Bicchugatti (2020). The film received positive reviews, and his performance was noted by critics. Veteran composer Hamsalekha appreciated his work in the film and commented on his potential.

He later appeared in Pranayam (2024), a romantic drama that received positive reviews, particularly for his performance. That same year, he starred in Hiranya, a gangster themed film that received mixed responses but performed well commercially. His sports drama Gajarama (2025), in which he portrayed a wrestler, marked another release in his career. In addition to acting, he is associated with a production banner named Barn Swallow Company.

== Filmography ==
Films

Year	Film	Role	Notes	Ref.
2020	Bicchugatti: Chapter 1 − Dalvayi Dange	Brahamanna Nayaka		
2024	Pranayam	Gautham		
2024	Hiranya	Raana		
2025	Gajarama	Rama		
2025	Kamal Sridevi	—N/a	As co-producer	
2026	Jawa	TBA		

== Social work ==
He pledged to donate his eyes to Minto Hospital and committed his full body for organ donation to BGS Hospital, making a meaningful contribution to eye and organ donation. He has also been actively involved in several other social initiatives.
