= Back Bencherz =

Indian comedy drama film

- Theatrical release poster
- Directed by: BR Rajashekar
- Written by: BR Rajashekar
- Produced by: Ramya Rajshekar
- Starring: Jathin Aryan; Akash MP; Shashank Simha; Manya Gowda; Kunkum H; Anusha Suresh; Manoj Shetty; Namith Gowda; Suchendra Prasad
- Cinematography: Manohar Joshi
- Edited by: Amar Gowda; Ranjan Narsimha Murthy
- Music by: Nakul Abhyankar
- Production company: Police Praki Production
- Release date: 19 July 2024
- Running time: 125 minutes
- Country: India
- Language: Kannada

Back Bencherz is a 2024 Indian Kannada-language comedy drama film written and directed by BR Rajashekar. Produced by Ramya Rajshekar under Police Praki Production, and starring Jathin Aryan, Akash MP, Shashank Simha, Manya Gowda, Kunkum H, Anusha Suresh, Manoj Shetty, Namith Gowda and Suchendra Prasad. The film was theatrically released on 19 July 2024.

== Cast ==
- Jathin Aryan
- Akash MP
- Shashank Simha
- Manya Gowda
- Kunkum H
- Anusha Suresh
- Manoj Shetty
- Namith Gowda
- Suchendra Prasad

== Production ==
The principal photography of the film took place in Bangalore.

== Reception ==
A Sharadhaa of Cinema Express gave the film three out of five stars. Manju Kotagunasi of Hindustan Times rated the film 3/5 stars.
