= Naveen Sajju =

Indian musical artist (born 1992)

- Born: 27 July 1992 (age 33); Mysore, Karnataka, India
- Genres: Filmi, Melody, Folk music
- Occupations: Playback singer; Music director; Actor
- Years active: 2013–present

Naveen Sajju (born 27 July 1992) is a state award-winning Indian playback singer and music director, sung over hundred songs in the Kannada film and television industry. In 2018, he was declared first runner-up of the reality show Bigg Boss Kannada 6.

Starting his musical career as an orchestra singer, Sajju entered Kannada cinema through the film Lucia (2013) and went on to win Karnataka State Film Award for Best Male Playback Singer for the song "Ede Olagina Tamate".

== Early life ==
Sajju was born in Mysore, Karnataka, India, on 27 July 1992. Raised in a modest background, he completed his schooling in Mysore and developed a strong interest in music from an early age. While still young, he joined a local orchestra band, performing folk and popular Kannada film songs during village tours. Sajju later pursued a diploma in music from Dr. Gangubai Hangal Music University, Mysore.

== Career ==
=== Playback singing ===
Naveen’s playback singing debut came in 2013 with the feature film Lucia, signifying a turning point in his career. The three songs composed by the debutante Poornachandra Tejaswi: “Ede Olagina Tamate (Jamma Jamma),” “Helu Shiva,” and “Yako Barlilla,” gained widespread popularity and topped iTunes charts. For his rendition of "Jamma Jamma", he was awarded the Karnataka State Film Award for Best Male Playback Singer in 2014. In 2015, he further expanded his singing credits across Kannada cinema with titles including RX Soori, Vascodigama, and Jackson.

Post this, he lent his voice to several mainstream films including Akira, Half Mentlu, Bhujanga, Ricky, and Yen Nin Problemmu.

=== Music direction ===
In addition to singing, Naveen expanded into music composition, first serving as music director in 2017 for Yen Nin Problemmu. However, his breakthrough as a composer came with the Duniya Vijay starrer, Kanaka in 2018, for which he composed the entire soundtrack and background score, comprising 8 tracks including “Enne Namdu Oota Nimdu” and “Bara Moda Karagi.” He also lent his vocals to key songs like “Enne Namdu” and “Duniya Dalle Don”. This marked his first major venture as a composer, transitioning from vocal performance to creative helm of musical narratives.

In 2020s, Naveen continued to diversify his musical portfolio with Salaga and Dear Vikram. His upcoming unreleased films include Kusthi and Lo Naveena.

=== Acting ===
Naveen had roots in acting prior his entry into films. He was a part of the theatre troupe "Niranthara" in Mysore. Post Lucia's success, he was offered acting roles in films and he had signed few of them which remains unreleased till date.. In 2019, it was announced that director Kumar had cast him opposite Sanjana Anand in his directorial film Charlie Chaplin. The project was shelved in the filming stage.

In 2024, Naveen announced two projects under his home banner Naveen Sajju Studios. The film, Lo Naveena features himself in the lead alongside composing the music.. The other project titled Mansion House Muthu also features him in the lead role.

=== Television ===
In 2018, Naveen entered Bigg Boss house as an inmate and emerged as the first runner up towards the finale. Later, he took up the series Chukki Thaare, aired on Colors Kannada to be his first television acting assignment in 2024. He portrayed a father figure (Mallikarjuna) involved in a family-focused drama centered on the bond between two young girls.

== Discography ==
=== Playback singer ===
Year	Title	Song(s)	Music director(s)	Notes	Ref
2013	Lucia	"Edeyolagina Tama Tamate" "Helu Shiva Yaakingade" "Yaako Barlilla" "Jamma Jamma (slow)"	Poornachandra Tejaswi	Debut film as a Playback Singer; Won - Karnataka State Film Award for Best Male Playback Singer; Nominated - SIIMA Award for Best Male Playback Singer - Kannada	
2014	Bahuparak	"Gedde Gelthanantha"	Bharath B. J.		
2014	Chathurbhuja	"Shivananjanppangu"	Poornachandra Tejaswi		
2014	Typical Kailas	"Thumbida Beeru"	V. Manohar		
2015	Raincoat	"Yaake Nanagishtu" "Naakani Entaani"	Daniel		
2015	Pattabhisheka	"Ganchali Bidi" "Thalegettu Mathigettu"	Rakshith Nagarle		
2015	RX Soori	"Dove Hodibyada" "Butte Butte"	Arjun Janya		
2015	Geetha Bangle Store	"Hupuduga"	V. Manohar		
2015	Jackson	"Godu Kelu Godu"	Arjun Janya		
2015	Eradondla Mooru	"Rahu Kaladalle" (pathos)	A. M. Neel		
2015	Sapnon Ki Rani	"Yappo Yappo"	Dharma Vish		
2015	Krishna Leela	"Muttilla Murililla"	Sridhar V. Sambhram		
2016	Golisoda	"Ee Thundu Haiklu" "Dhammu Hodeda" "Lovalli Bidda" "Preethigilli Age Illa" "Tight Aadre" "Aaradi Mooradi" "Rana Ranga"	Rajesh Ramanath; Sai Karthik		
2016	Ricky	"Ele Mareyali"	Arjun Janya		
2016	Happy Birthday	"Hogume Hogume"	V. Harikrishna		
2016	Lifeu Super	"Billu Amele Nodona"	Judah Sandhy		
2016	Half Mentlu	"Marammana Eduralli"	Bharath B. J.		
2016	Bhujanga	"Alibaba Father" "Preethine Dyavaru"	Poornachandra Tejaswi		
2016	Mandya Star	"Mahadeva"	Manoj S		
2016	Supari Surya	"Don't Worry"	Sridhar V. Sambhram		
2016	Akira	"Godu Godu Bandavne"	B. Ajaneesh Loknath		
2016	Possible	"Hale Hudgi Feelingu"	Dinesh Kumar		
2016	Mandya Star	"Mahadeva"	Manoj S		
2017	En Nin Problemmu	"En Nin Problemmu" "Mugila Hanchanu"	Himself		
2017	Style Raja	"Daam Dum"	Rajesh Ramanath		
2017	Dada is Back	"Cycle Gappal Love Aytu"	Anoop Seelin		
2017	Halu Thuppa	"Naadu Hoganthade"	Indrasena		
2018	Kanaka	"Enne Namdu" "Bara Moda" "Duniyadalle Don"	Himself	Nominated - SIIMA Award for Best Male Playback Singer - Kannada	
2018	Shiva Paru	"Cheluvayya Cheluvo" "Jeevakinta Hechchu"	America Suresh		
2018	Tharakaasura	"Chanda Mama Kalide Kathe"	Dharma Vish		
2018	Shathaya Gathaya	"Lungi Ethkondu"	Ravinandan Jain		
2018	Devrantha Manushya	"Moore Folk Version"	Pradyothan		
2018	I Dash You	"Preethi Koduva"	Adil Nadaf		
2018	Amavase	"Maga Tension Aadre"	Hari Babu		
2018	Puttaraju	"Thoothagiro Ragimudde"	Sriram Gandharva		
2019	Sinnga	"What a Beautifullu"	Dharma Vish		
2019	Samayada Hinde Savari	"Daivagala Beedalli"	Rajguru Hoskote		
2019	Girmit	"Tik Tok"	Ravi Basrur		
2019	Girgitle	"Beda Guru Beda"	Leo Peters		
2019	Brahmachari	"Hidka Hidka"	Dharma Vish		
2019	Kiss	"Samadhana"	V. Harikrishna		
2020	Khaki	"Prathiyobba"	Rithvik Muralidhar		
2020	Hulidurga	"Heartal Oblu Unplugged"	Sathish Babu		
2020	Dinga	"Hogi Baruvenu Naa"	Suddho Roy		
2020	Gadinadu	"Mavayya Heartalli"	Elwin Joshwa		
2020	Aanebala	"Malavalli Jathreli"	Poornachandra Tejaswi		
2020	Purusoth Rama	"Purusoth Rama"	Suddho Roy		
2021	Salaga	"I Love You Sanjana"	Himself		
2021	Krishna Talkies	"Nighty Matra Haakobeda"	Sridhar V. Sambhram		
2021	Love You Rachchu	"Love You Rachchu"	Manikanth Kadri		
2021	Jeevnane Natka Samy	"Mooru Dinada Markettu"	Athishay Jain		
2021	SriKrishna@gmail.com	"Namgella Yaar Beelthare"	Arjun Janya		
2021	Mangalavara Rajaadina	"Koole"	Prajoth D'Sa		
2021	Ambani Puthra	"Highway Roadal"	Abhishek G Roy		
2022	By Two Love	"Huduga Hudugi"	B. Ajaneesh Loknath		
2022	Gandhada Gudi	"Alemaari Jothi"	B. Ajaneesh Loknath		
2022	Dheeran	"Valad Maga"	R S Ganesh Narayanan		
2022	Sugarless	"Title track"	Anoop Seelin		
2022	Shambo Shiva Shankara	"Naati Koli"	Hithan Hasan		
2022	Dhamaka	"Thukaali"	Vikas Vasishta		
2022	Gaalipata 2	"Thatherike Thayerike"	Arjun Janya		
2022	Selfie Mummy Google Daddy	"Kabbadi Adona"	Shamanth Nag		
2022	Taledanda	"Preethi Prema"	Harikavya		
2022	Critical Keerthanegalu	"IPL Nal Ethkonde"	Veer Samarth		
2022	Kirik Shankar	"Nimmavunna Kelo"	Veer Samarth		
2022	Mata	"Kalla Mele Kalla Ittu"	Sriguru		
2023	Raghavendra Stores	"Single Sundara"	B. Ajaneesh Loknath		
2023	Orchestra Mysuru	"Maadappa"	Raghu Dixit		
2023	Ardhambarda Prema Kathe	"Jingalaka"	Arjun Janya		
2023	Shreemantha	"Ele Halsin Thole"	Hamsalekha		
2023	Radha Searching Ramana Missing	"Collegu Boreu"	Navaneeth Chari		
2023	Undenama	"First Night"	Sridhar V Sambhram		
2023	Paramvah	"Snehada Kadalalli"	Aparijith, Jos Jossey		
2023	Sneharshi	"Modala Hejjege"	Akash Ayyappa		
2023	Damayana	"Idu Damayana"	Keerthan Bhalla		
2023	Baby Missing	"Nodu Nodu"	Shree Shastha		
2023	Mareyade Kshamisu	"Gare Kelsa"	Aaron Karthik Venkatesh		
2024	Bheema	"Bittu Hodeya"	Charan Raj		
2024	Bharjari Gandu	"Sukka Saarayigintha"	Gummineni Vijay		
2024	Chaaya	"Yaarigenu" "Matthalli Kuniyona"	Manju Kavi		
2024	Pretha	"Doorada Oorige"	Praveen Srinivasamurthy		
2024	Maryade Prashne	"Haneya Baraha"	Arjun Ramu		
2024	Crush	"Super Figaru Machchi"	Vineeth Raj Menon		
2024	Mathsyagandha	"Nashe Nashe"	Prashanth Siddhi		
2024	Thooth Kaasu	"Thooth Kaasu"	Loki Tavasya		
2024	Ramesh Suresh	"Title track"	Navaneeth		
2024	Dheera Bhagath Roy	"Aakashada Neeli"	Poornachandra Tejaswi		
2024	Kandor Mane Kathe	"Somberi"	John Kennedy		
2025	Nimma Vasthugalige Neeve Javaabdaararu	"Gaayab"	Prasad K Shetty		
2025	Vidya Ganesha	"Olle Manssige"	Anil C J		
2025	Narayana Narayana	"Color Chitte"	Sathya Radhakrishna		
2025	Rudra Garuda Purana	"Hukka Elli"	Krishna Prasad		
2025	Nimde Kathe	"Dhad Nan Magane"	Praveen Nikethan		
2025	Usiru	"Donga Donga"	R S Ganesh Narayanan		

=== Music Director ===
Year	Film	Other Note(s)
2017	En Nin Problemmu	
2018	Kanaka	
2021	Salaga	One song only
