= Vijay Kiragandur =

Indian film producer

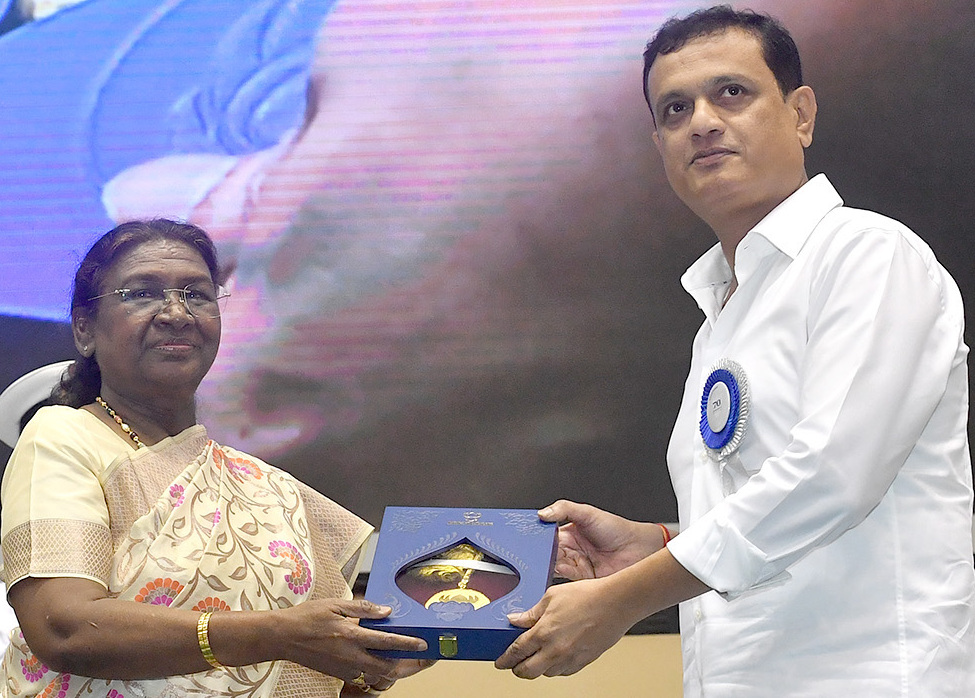
- Vijay receiving National Film Award in 2024
- Born: 3 October 1976 (age 49); Bengaluru, Karnataka, India
- Occupation: Film producer
- Years active: 2014–present

Vijay Kiragandur (born 3 October 1976) is an Indian film producer and distributor, predominantly active in the Kannada film industry. He is the founder of Hombale Films production company. Notable films he has produced include Raajakumara, the KGF film series and Salaar: Part 1 – Ceasefire.

Vijay has won two National Film Awards for the films KGF: Chapter 2 and Kantara.

== Early life ==
Vijay was born on 3 October 1976 in Bengaluru, Karnataka, India.

== Career ==
In 2012, Vijay Kiragandur co-founded Hombale Films alongside Chaluve Gowda. The company’s inaugural production was the 2014 Kannada film Ninnindale, starring Puneeth Rajkumar. This was followed by Masterpiece in 2015, featuring Yash in the lead role. In 2017 he produced Raajakumara, directed by Santhosh Ananddram and starring Puneeth Rajkumar, which became the top grossing Kannada film at the time, reportedly earning over ₹75 crore.

In 2018, Vijay produced K.G.F: Chapter 1, directed by Prashanth Neel starring Yash. The film was released in multiple languages and became the first Kannada film to gross over ₹200 crore globally. Its sequel, K.G.F: Chapter 2, released in 14 April 2022, and became the second highest grossing Indian film of 2022 worldwide, highest grossing film of 2022 in India, fifth highest-grossing Indian film worldwide, and the third highest-grossing film in India.

His next film Kantara, was written, directed and acted in by Rishab Shetty. It was released on 30 September 2022 to positive reviews. Made with ₹160,000,000, it grossed more than ₹4,000,000,000 worldwide. It became the second-highest grossing film of Kannada cinema, and sold more tickets than any other Kannada film, beating K.G.F: Chapter 2.

== Filmography ==
Key
| † | Denotes film or TV productions that have not yet been released |

=== As producer ===
- All the films are in Kannada language unless otherwise mentioned.

| Year | Film | Director | Notes | Ref. |
|---|---|---|---|---|
| 2014 | Ninnindale | Jayanth C. Paranjee | First Production | |
| 2015 | Masterpiece | Manju Mandavya | | |
| 2017 | Raajakumara | Santhosh Ananddram | | |
| 2018 | K.G.F: Chapter 1 | Prashanth Neel | | |
| 2021 | Yuvarathnaa | Santhosh Ananddram | | |
| 2022 | K.G.F: Chapter 2 | Prashanth Neel | | |
| 2022 | Kantara | Rishab Shetty | | |
| 2023 | Raghavendra Stores | Santhosh Ananddram | | |
| 2023 | Dhoomam | Pawan Kumar | Malayalam film | |
| 2023 | Salaar: Part 1 – Ceasefire | Prashanth Neel | Telugu film | |
| 2024 | Raghu Thatha | Suman Kumar | Tamil film | |
| 2024 | Yuva | Santhosh Ananddram | | |
| 2024 | Bagheera | Dr. Suri | | |
| 2025 | Mahavatar Narsimha | Ashwin Kumar | Animated movie | |
| 2025 | Kantara: Chapter 1 | Rishab Shetty | | |
| 2026 | Richard Antony: Lord of the Sea † | Rakshit Shetty | Pre-production | |
| 2027 | Salaar: Part 2 – Shouryaanga Parvam † | Prashanth Neel | Telugu film Filming | |

=== As distributor ===
Key
| † | Denotes film or TV productions that have not yet been released |

| Year | Film | Director | Language | Ref. |
| 2024 | The Goat Life | Blessy | Malayalam | |
| 2024 | Romeo | Vinayak Vaithianathan | Tamil | |
| 2024 | Boat | Chimbu Deven | Tamil | |
| 2024 | Prasanna Vadanam | Arjun Y. K | Telugu | |
| 2024 | Utsavam | Arjun Sai | Telugu | |
| 2024 | Aho Vikramaarka | Peta Trikoti | Telugu | |
| 2024 | ARM | Jithin Laal | Malayalam | |
| 2024 | Pani | Joju George | Malayalam | |

== Awards and nominations ==
| Award | Category | Work | Result | Ref. |
| 2017 Karnataka State Film Awards | Best Family Entertainer | Raajakumara | Won | |
| 7th South Indian International Movie Awards | Best Film | Raajakumara | Won | |
| Zee Kannada Hemmeya Kanndiga Awards | Best Film | KGF: Chapter 1 | Won | |
| 8th SIIMA Awards | Best Film | KGF: Chapter 1 | Won | |
| 66th Filmfare Awards South | Best Film – Kannada | KGF: Chapter 1 | Won | |
| 10th South Indian International Movie Awards | Best Film | Yuvarathnaa | Nominated | |
| 70th National Film Awards | Kannada Feature Film | KGF: Chapter 2 | Won | |
| 70th National Film Awards | Best Popular Film | Kantara | Won | |
| 68th Filmfare Awards South | Best Film | Kantara | Won | |
| 68th Filmfare Awards South | Best Film | KGF: Chapter 2 | Nominated | |
| 3rd IIFA Utsavam | Best Picture | Salaar: Part 1 | Nominated | |
| 12th South Indian International Movie Awards | Best Debut Producer (Malayalam) | Dhoomam | Nominated | |
