= Careful (2017 film) =

- Directed by: V. K. Prakash
- Written by: Rajesh Jayaraman
- Story by: Pawan Kumar
- Based on: U Turn (Kannada) (2016) by Pawan Kumar
- Produced by: Suresh Balaje; George Pius Tharayil
- Starring: Vijay Babu; Sandhya Raju; Saiju Kurup; Parvathy Nambiar; Aju Varghese
- Cinematography: Dhanesh Raveendranath
- Edited by: Babu Rathnam
- Music by: Aravind–Shankar
- Production company: Wide Angle Creations
- Distributed by: Maxlab Cinemas and Entertainments
- Release date: 26 May 2017 (India)
- Running time: 120 min
- Country: India
- Language: Malayalam

Careful is a 2017 Indian Malayalam-language thriller film directed by V. K. Prakash. The film stars Vijay Babu, Sandhya Raju, Saiju Kurup, and Parvathy Nambiar in lead roles. It was released in India on 26 May 2017. It is a remake of 2016 Kannada film U Turn by Pawan Kumar. The film marked actress Jomol's feature film comeback after a decade-long hiatus from film acting.

== Cast ==
- Vijay Babu as SI Ajith Chandran
- Sandhya Raju as Rachana Nambiar
- Saiju Kurup as Ramesh
- Jomol as Suja
- Parvathy Nambiar as SI Anna Mariyam
- Vineeth Kumar as Bijoy
- Mukundan as Head Constable Sukumaran
- Ashokan as CI Purushothaman
- Krishna Kumar as Sudeep
- Sreejaya Nair as Mrs. Sudeep
- Sreejith Ravi as ASI
- Prem Prakash
- Tosh Christy as SI Biju
- Aju Varghese as Adv. Aneesh Abraham

== Reception ==
Anna M. M. Vetticad of Firstpost called the film "immensely watchable" giving it a rating of 2.75/5. Reviewing the performances of the cast, Deepa Soman of The Times of India wrote: "Sandhya hardly seems comfortable in the skin of a journalist to carry it off convincingly. Sadly for the rest of the actors, the story does not provide any scope for interesting performances". She gave a rating of 2.0/5. A reviewer of Sify rated the film as "an easy one time watch".
