= Sangeetha Rajeev =

Indian singer

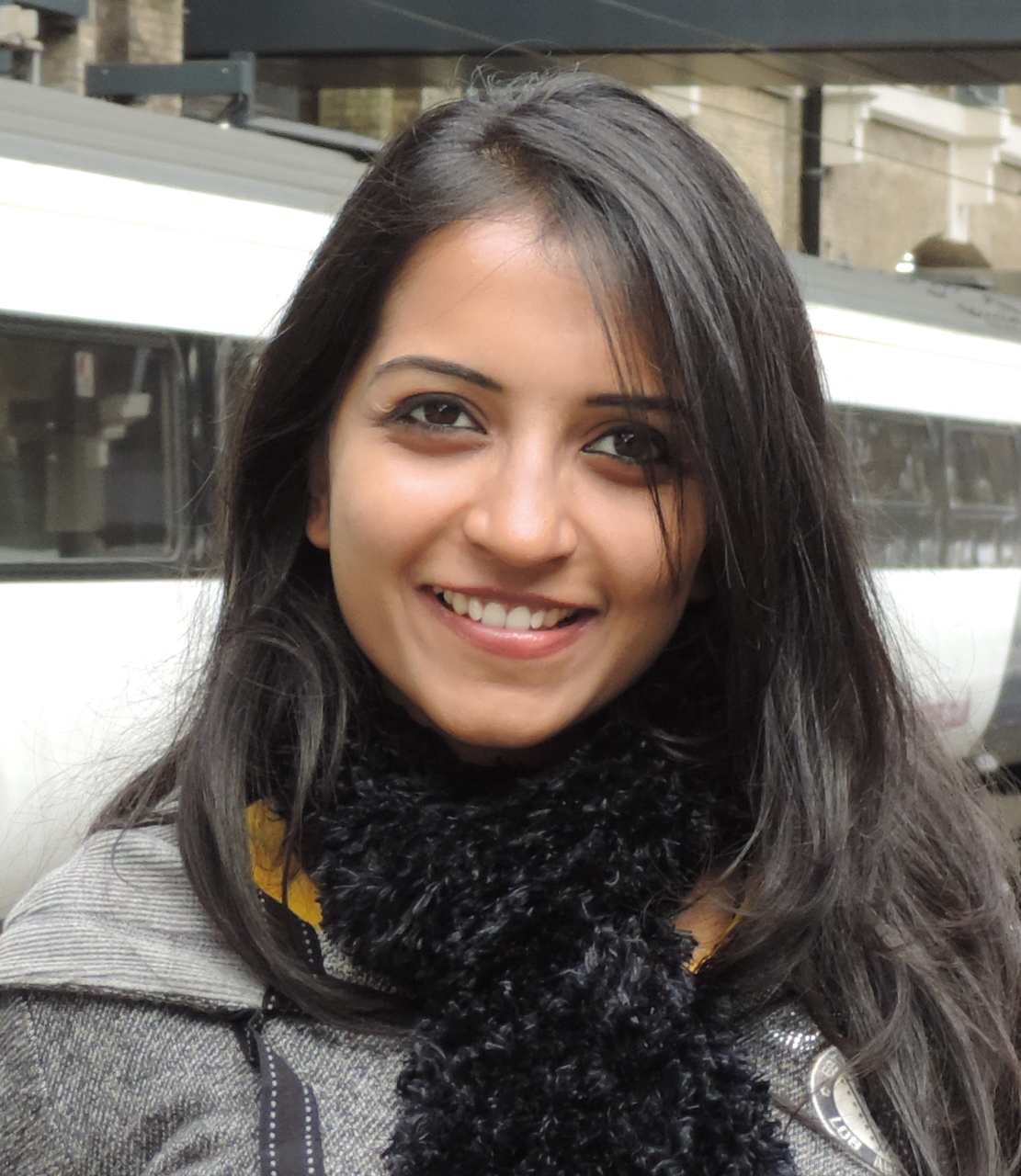
- Sangeetha Rajeev in London

Background information
- Born: Bangalore, Karnataka, India
- Origin: India
- Genres: Pop, Ka-Pop, Electronic Dance Music (EDM), Indian Folk Music
- Occupations: Singer, composer, actress
- Instruments: Vocals, keyboard, guitar
- Years active: 2013–present
- Label: Sara Records

Sangeetha Rajeev (born 23 October), also known professionally as SaRa, is an Indian playback singer, composer and independent music artist. She is known for her contributions to Kannada pop music (Ka-Pop) and is regarded as one of the first female independent artists in the Kannada music scene. And she introduced the genre Ka Pop or ಕ Pop (Kannada Pop), which was launched by the legendary Dr. Puneeth Rajkumar.

In 2019, she received the Best International Pop Singer award at the VIMA Music Awards in Malaysia.

Sangeetha has collaborated with several notable artists, including Sonu Nigam for the Kannada track "Neene Neene", which was later released in Hindi as "Tuhi Tuhi". Her single "Nee Hinga Nodabyada", which she wrote, composed and performed, gained widespread popularity and became one of the most recognisable tracks in the Kannada independent music space.

She has since expanded into other regional music industries, debuting in Telugu with the single "Naa Raju" and in Punjabi with the EP Rise (2023). In 2022, she was featured by YouTube as part of its "Creating for India" campaign, becoming the first artist from Karnataka to receive front-page coverage in major newspapers through the initiative.

Sangeetha is also pursuing a career in acting, with upcoming roles in the Hindi film Red Collar and the 2025 released Kannada feature film Nimitta Matra. She also received positive reviews for her performance in the film from both critics and audiences.

== Early life ==
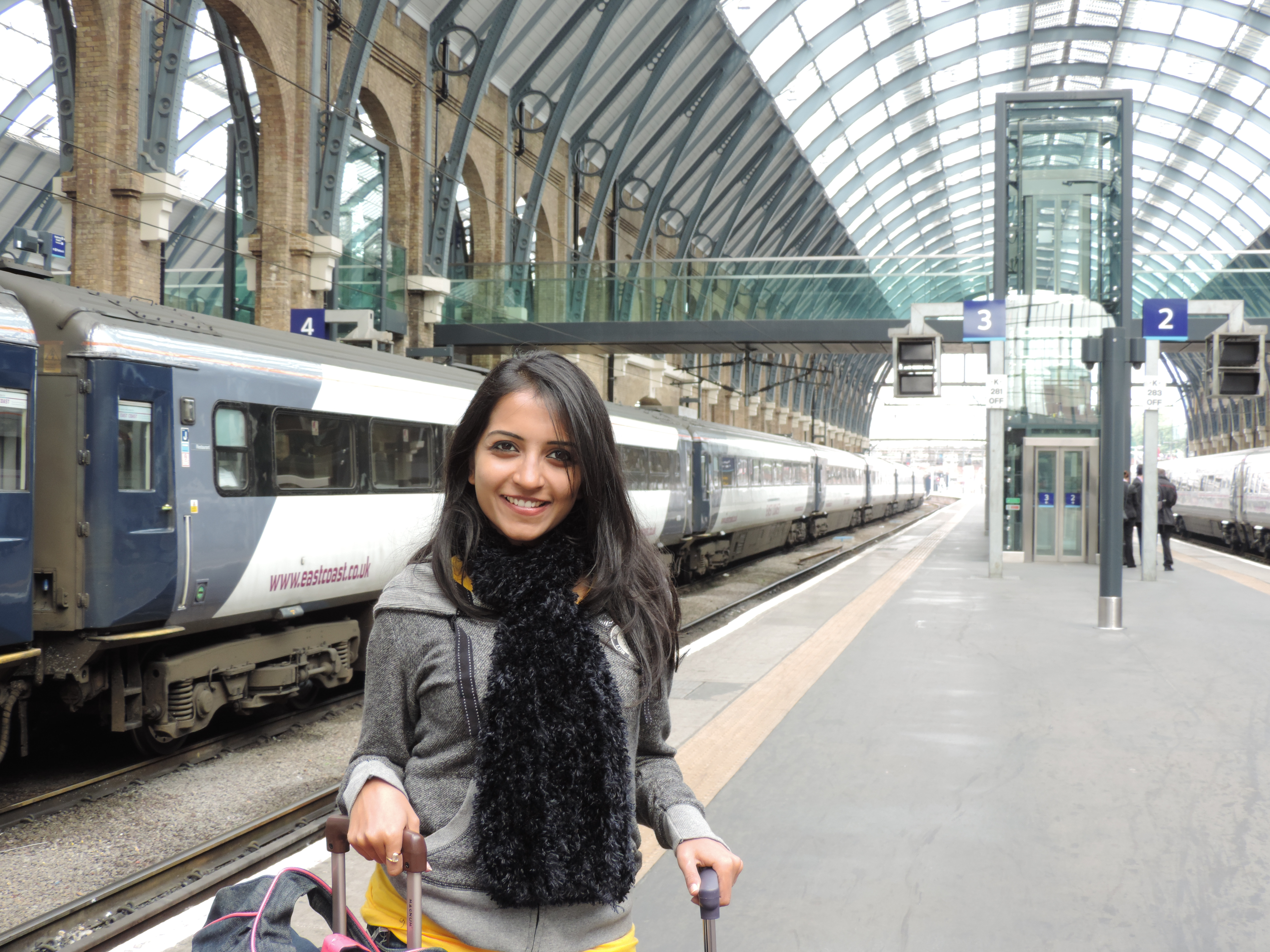
Sangeetha in London during her early days

Sangeetha Rajeev was born Bangalore to a musical family. Her father S Rajeev was a bank manager, who had to move to Mumbai on an official transfer. She along with her family moved to Mumbai at the age of 6 where she spent most of her childhood. In Mumbai she was trained in Bharatnatyam and Carnatic classical music. She is also trained in Hindustani classical music.

Sangeetha did most of her schooling in Mumbai. Sangeetha graduated in information science engineering. She then moved to England to work before returning to India to pursue music.

== Career ==
Sangeetha started her career from Kannada films. She was introduced to this industry by the music composer Dharma Vish. She sang a song in the film Aane Pataaki for which she also won the best playback singer award the same year. She was then introduced to the Tollywood industry by the Kshanam music composer Sricharan Pakala and director Shreeranjani through actor/producer Nagarjuna's home production Annapurna Studios. She started her Telugu film career with the film Rangula Ratnam where she sang the Birthday (Tic Toc) song and became the voice of Sithara (actress). She has also sung in the Hindi film Simply Ek Love Story.

She has also produced and composed many independent singles in the Kannada and Hindi languages, including "Nee Hinga Nodabyada". Her single "Neene Neene" was a collaboration with Sonu Nigam

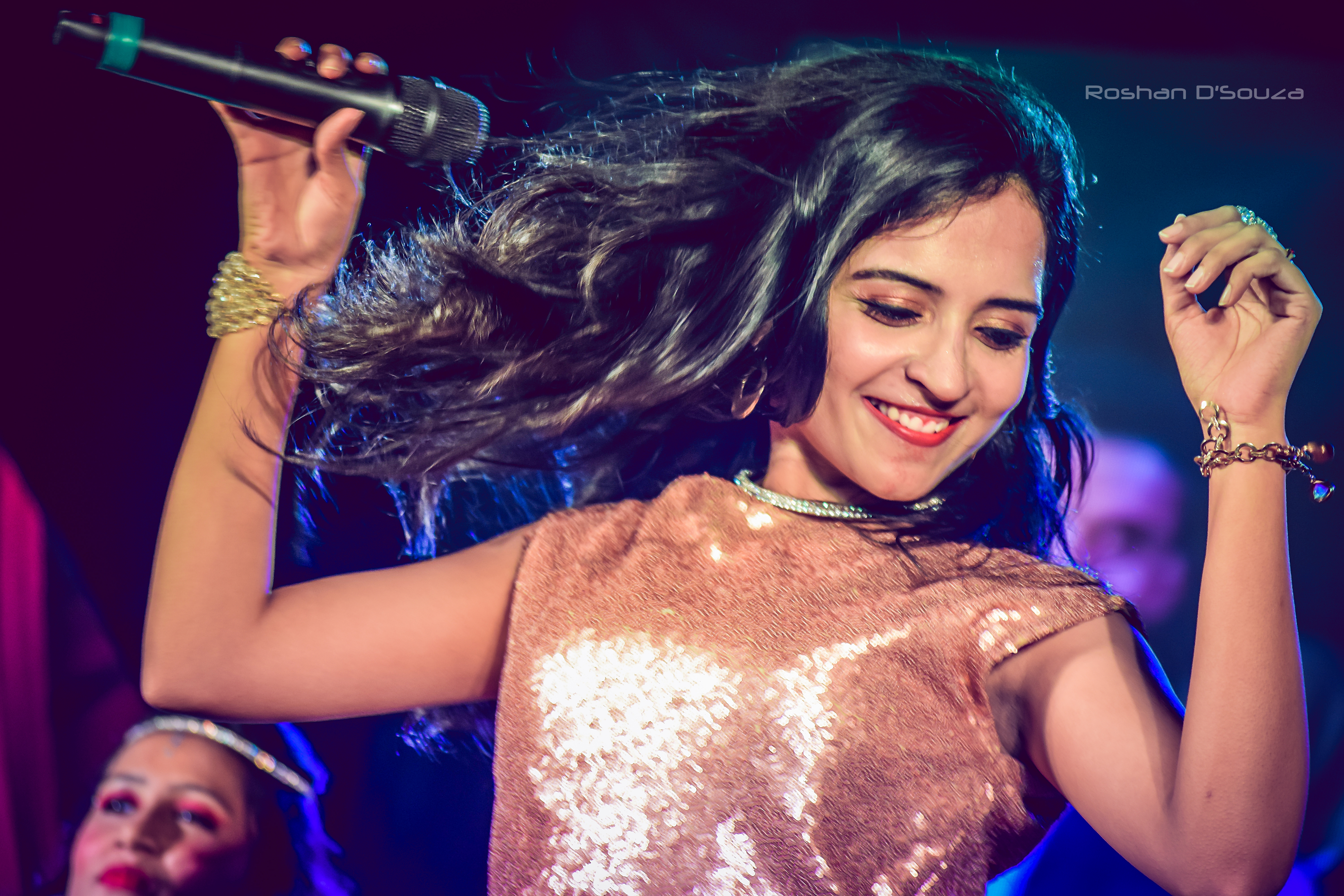
Sangeetha performing at Pro Kabbadi

== Influences ==
One of SaRa's early musical influences was her mother herself, M K Sharadamba, who is a Carnatic classical musician. SaRa is highly influenced by western music and considers the late great Michael Jackson to be her western influences.

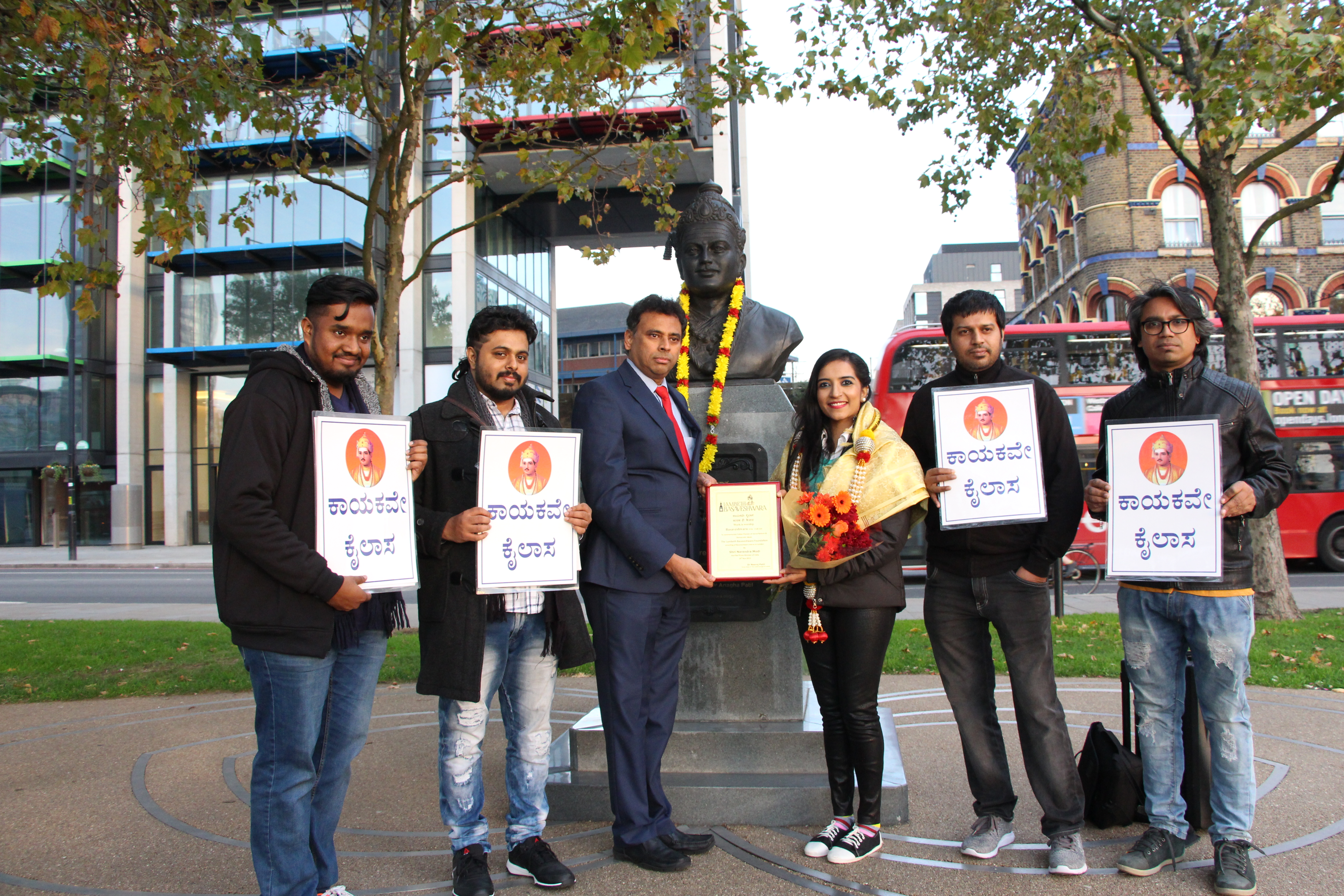
Sangeetha felicitated in London

== Discography ==
=== As a playback singer ===
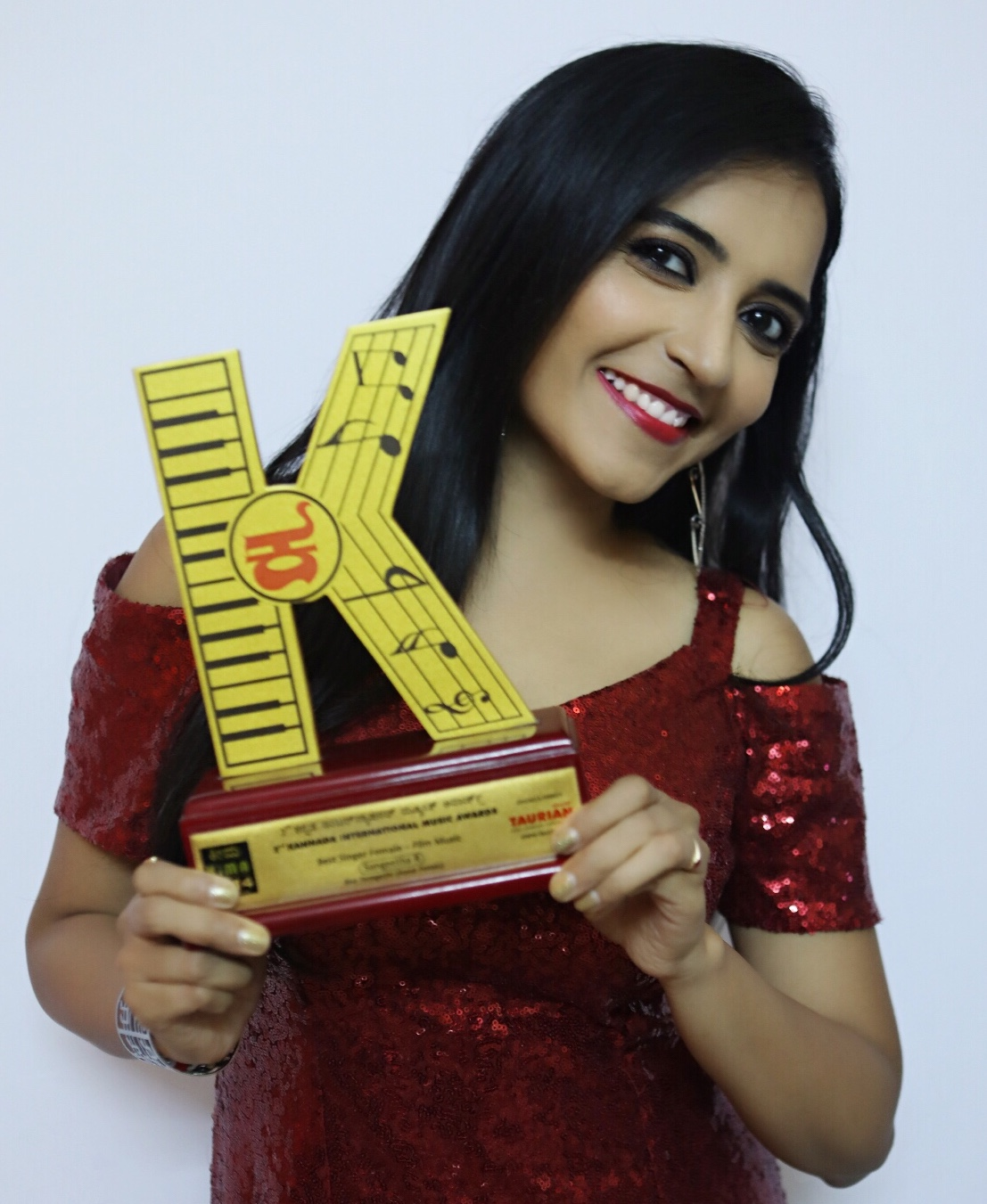
Sangeetha Rajeev wins the Best Playback Singer at Kannada International Music Awards, KiMA

Year	Song	Film / Album	Composer	Language	Ref.
2013	"Yentane taragathi"	Aane Pataaki	Dharma Vish	Kannada	
2013	"Thinbedakami 2"	Lucia	Poornachandra Tejaswi	Kannada	
2014	"Haule Haule"	Simply Ek Love Story	Karthik Vijay	Hindi	
2015	"Ali Baba"	Rebel	Jassie Gift	Kannada	
2015	"Namma ee aata"	Aadhya	Jeevan Reddy	Kannada	
2016	"Bijili Krishna"	I Dash You	Adil Nadaf	Kannada	
2016	"Hero Cycle"	Bhujanga	Poornachandra Tejaswi (composer)	Kannada	
2016	"Khushi"	Looty	Dharma Vish	Tulu	
2017	"Dhool Yebbussro"	Raj Vishnu	Arjun Janya	Kannada	
2018	"Birthday"	Rangula Ratnam	Sricharan Pakala	Telugu	
2018	"Namde Lifu"	Edakallu Guddada Mele	Ashic Arun	Kannada	
2019	"Rum Rum Rurum (Psychedelic Song)"	Mataash	S.D. Aravinda	Kannada	
2019	"Heartalli"	Chanaksha	Abhimann Roy	Kannada	
2019	"Nadu Naachide"	Naguva Nayana	Karthik Pai	Kannada	
2019	"Payanava"	Premier Padmini	Arjun Janya	Kannada	
2019	"Taasha"	Kushka	Abhilash Gupta	Kannada	
2019	"Shaane Top Agavne"	Sinnga	Dharma Vish	Kannada	
2019	"Mussanje-EDM"	Paaravvana Kanasu	Tharun Symonds	Kannada	
2020	"Moodanada Surya"	Gule	Sangeetha Rajeev	Kannada	
2020	"Oora Bittu"	Gule	Sangeetha Rajeev	Kannada	
2021	"I Love You" Feat Puneeth Rajkumar	Namma Hudugaru	Abhimann Roy	Kannada	
2021	"Late Late"	Puncture	Manasa Holla	Kannada	
2022	"Coka 2.0"	Liger	Jaani, Lijo George-DJ Chetas	Kannada	
2023	"Yaaro Yaaro"	Yadha Yadha Hi	Sricharan Pakala		
2025	"Jawari Swag"	Nimitta Matra	Sangeetha Rajeev		
2025	"Mouna"	Nimitta Matra	Sangeetha Rajeev		

=== Independent Music ===
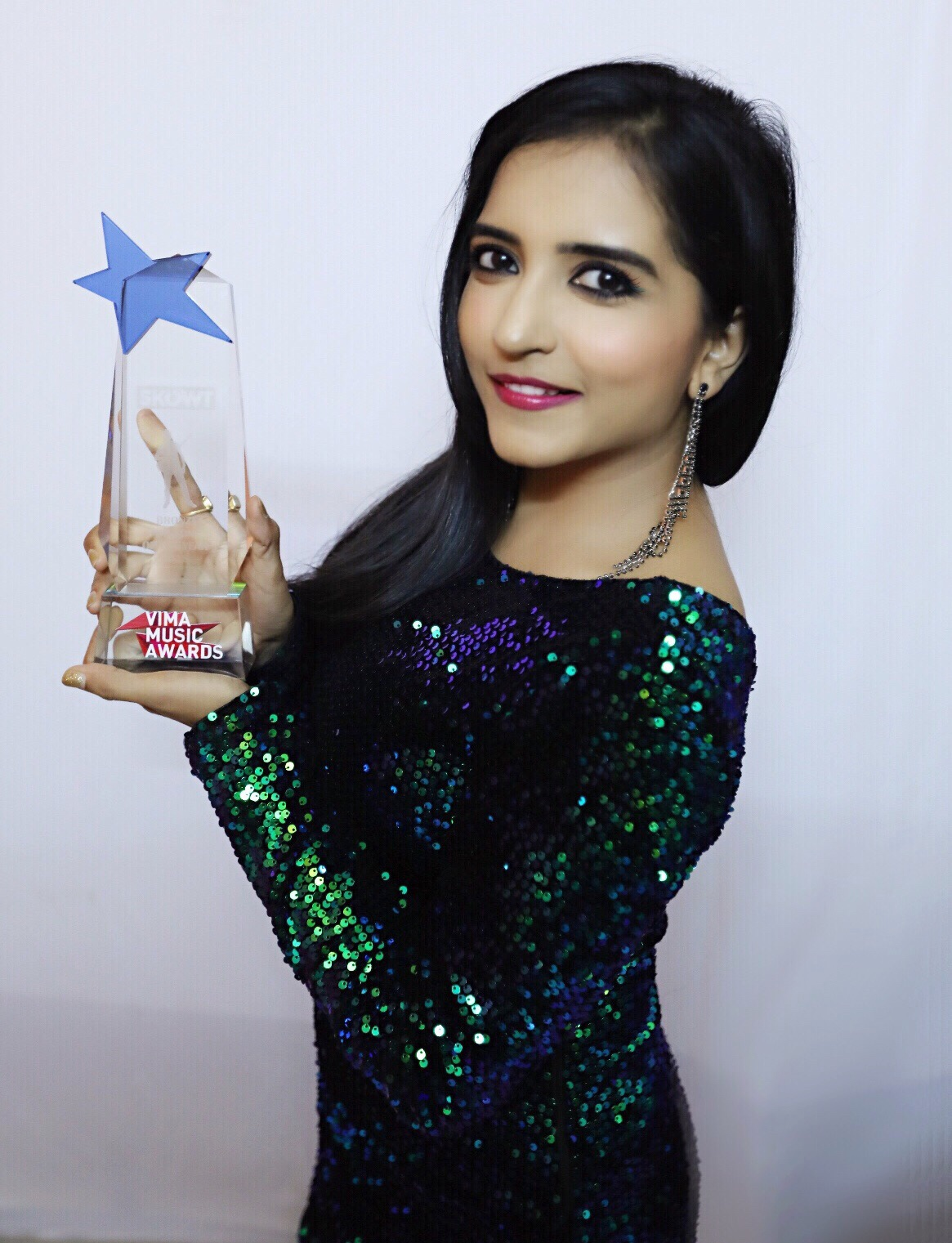
Sangeetha Rajeev wins the Best International Pop Song at Global VIMA, 2019 in Kuala Lumpur, Malaysia

Year	Work	Composer	Language
2013	"Sarvasva"	Sangeetha Rajeev	Kannada
2016	"Chan Se Udi"	Sangeetha Rajeev	Hindi
2017	"Kare"	Sangeetha Rajeev	Kannada
2018	"Tu Hi"	Sangeetha Rajeev	Hindi
2018	"Ee Sala Cup Namde (RCB Anthem)"	Sangeetha Rajeev	Kannada
2018	"Zindagi"	Sangeetha Rajeev	Hindi
2018	"Nan E Life"	Sangeetha Rajeev	Kannada
2019	"Hai Salaam"	Sangeetha Rajeev	Hindi
2020	"YML"	Sangeetha Rajeev	Kannada
2020	"Thank You Maa"	Sangeetha Rajeev	Kannada
2020	"Wedlock Down"	Sangeetha Rajeev	Kannada
2020	"Nee Hinga Nodabyada"	Sangeetha Rajeev	Kannada
2020	"Neene Neene"	Sangeetha Rajeev	Kannada
2020	"Tuhi Tuhi"	Sangeetha Rajeev	Hindi
2020	"Ena Maadali"	Sangeetha Rajeev	Kannada
2021	"Noda Noda"	Sangeetha Rajeev	Kannada
2021	"Appa"	Sangeetha Rajeev	Kannada
2021	"Nee Hinga Nodabyada 2"	Sangeetha Rajeev	Kannada
2021	"Nannatta Soodamaku"	Sangeetha Rajeev	Telugu
2021	"Nannatta Soodamaku 2"	Sangeetha Rajeev	Telugu
2021	"Naa Muttidella Chinna"	Sangeetha Rajeev	Kannada
2022	"Lovvu Lovvu"	Sangeetha Rajeev	Kannada
2022	"Naa Raju"	Sangeetha Rajeev	Telugu
2022	"Nan Raja"	Sangeetha Rajeev	Kannada
2022	"Neene Illade"	Sangeetha Rajeev	Kannada
2022	"Tanha"	Sangeetha Rajeev	Hindi
2023	"Aigiri Nandini"	Sangeetha Rajeev	Kannada
2023	"Innu Yaaka Baralilla"	Sangeetha Rajeev	Kannada
2023	"Rise"	Sangeetha Rajeev	Punjabi
2025	"Rudra (By SHAZZE & Stone Van Brooken Feat. Sangeetha Rajeev)"	Sangeetha Rajeev	Sanskrit
2025	"Jai Ganaraya"	Sangeetha Rajeev	Hindi

As a Music Director
Year	Song	Film	Language
2020	Oora Bittu	Gule	Kannada
2020	Moodanada Surya	Gule	Kannada
2025	Jawari Swag	Nimitta Matra	Kannada
2025	Mouna	Nimitta Matra	Kannada
2025	Mouna Sad Reprise	Nimitta Matra	Kannada
2025	Jo Jo	Nimitta Matra	Kannada

== Filmography ==
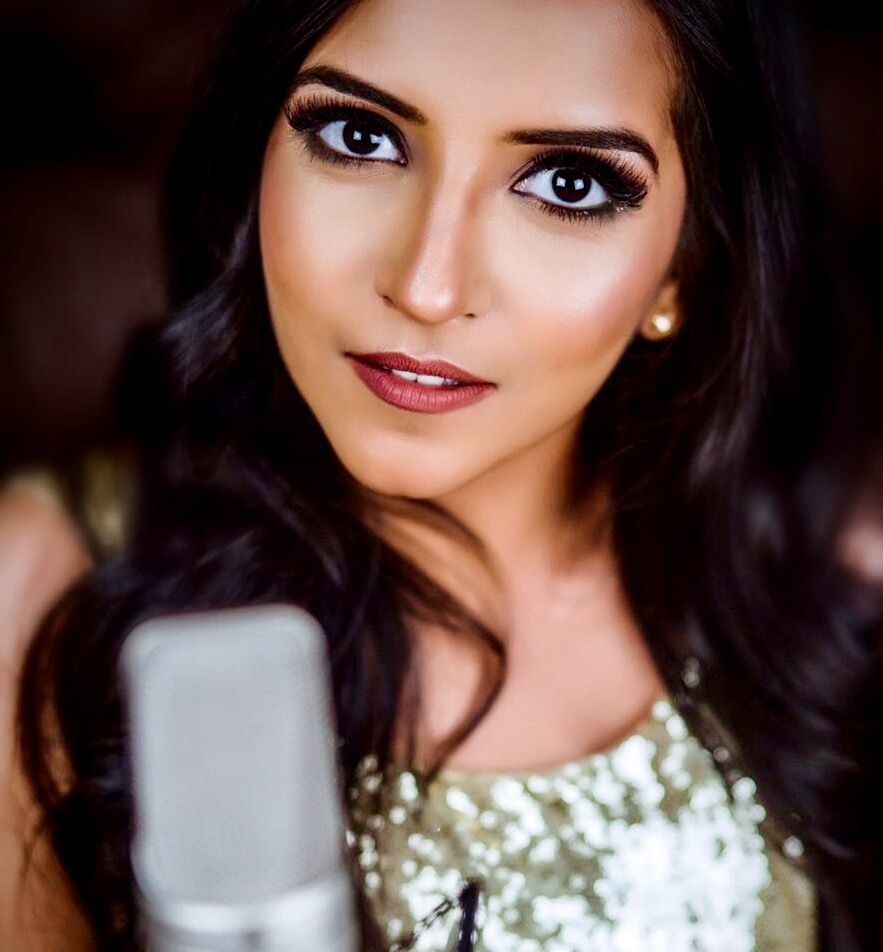
Sangeetha as an actor

Year	Film	Language	Ref.
2024	Red Collar	Hindi	
2025	Nimitta Matra	Kannada	

== Awards ==
Award	Song	Language	Ref.
VIMA International Music Awards	Zindagi	Hindi	
KiMA International Music Awards	Yentane Taragathi	Kannada	
