= U Turn (2016 film) =

- Theatrical release poster
- Directed by: Pawan Kumar
- Written by: Pawan Kumar
- Produced by: Pawan Kumar
- Starring: Shraddha Srinath; Roger Narayan; Radhika Chetan; Dileep Raj
- Cinematography: Advaitha Gurumurthy; Satya Hegde; Siddhartha Nuni
- Edited by: Suresh Arumugam
- Music by: Poornachandra Tejaswi
- Production company: Pawan Kumar Studios
- Distributed by: Mysore Talkies
- Release date: 20 May 2016
- Running time: 121 minutes
- Country: India
- Language: Kannada
- Budget: ₹2.5 crore

U Turn is a 2016 Indian Kannada-language supernatural thriller film written, produced and directed by Pawan Kumar. It stars Shraddha Srinath in the lead role. Roger Narayan, Dileep Raj and Radhika Chetan feature in supporting roles. The plot revolves around the death of motorists who break a traffic rule at a particular flyover in Bangalore and subsequent pinning down of the culprit by an intern journalist and police inspector duo. The film received critical acclaim and being remade a lot of times in different languages.

U-Turn was first remade in Malayalam in 2017 as Careful. Director Pawan Kumar remade it into a Telugu-Tamil bilingual in 2018 with the same title—thereby making it the fourth Kannada film to be remade in three other South Indian languages after School Master, Sampathige Savaal and Devara Kannu.

The movie was remade in Sinhala in 2019 also titled U Turn—thereby becoming the second Kannada movie to be remade in Sinhala after Anuraga Aralithu.

The Filipino remake with the same name was released on pay-to-view basis on 30 October 2020. With that, U Turn became the first Indian movie to be remade in Filipino.

The Bengali remake titled Flyover was released on 2 April 2021.

Ekta Kapoor produced the Hindi remake with the same title which released on 28 April 2023. With that, it became the third Indian movie to be remade in seven languages after Nuvvostanante Nenoddantana and Anuraga Aralithu. It was the seventh Kannada movie to be remade in a foreign language and the second Kannada movie to be remade in two foreign languages after Anuraga Aralithu.

== Plot ==
Rachana, an intern with The Indian Express, is working on an article on the accidents at a flyover in Bengaluru. She also has a crush on the crime reporter Aditya, whose help she seeks for research material on accidents on the flyover. She finds that each day some motorists move the concrete blocks that partition the road just to take a quick u-turn and avoid the traffic. They do not move the concrete blocks, which are left lying randomly on the road leading to many accidents. A homeless man sitting on the flyover notes down the vehicle numbers of commuters who violate the rule to take the u-turn and gives the list to Rachana. She obtains the details of the culprits using her contact in the traffic department, with the intention of confronting them for their "short-cut" and writing an article for the paper. Her attempt to meet the first person on the list goes in vain.

Later the same day, the police take her into custody and accuse her of killing the same person she wanted to meet. She is shocked and tells her side of the story. Though the senior police officer rejects it, sub-inspector Nayak finds her account believable and does some investigation. It is revealed that all the people Rachana has on her list have committed suicide. They also notice that each person committed suicide the same day they took the illegal "u-turn". Rachana and Nayak find another number has been noted by the homeless man which is to be delivered to Rachana the next day. The duo trace the address and try to rescue the man, a lawyer, who has taken the u-turn on the same day. As nothing seems suspicious, both leave only to encounter the very death of the lawyer whom they came to rescue.

Later Rachana tries to confront the homeless man for the injuries on the flyover. Meanwhile, she sees two young men violate the u-turn and reports it to Nayak. Nayak locks them up in an old police lock-up to save their lives. But they start fighting and eventually die under the nose of the police.

With no way of finding the real cause of the death of the culprits, Rachana herself takes the wrong u-turn and waits for something to happen. The one who has been killing the culprits is a ghost named Maya, because she and her daughter Aarna died in an accident due to the concrete roadblocks that were moved by the culprits in order to make way for their u-turn. Using her supernatural powers, Maya tries to kill Rachana as well. But Rachana promises to find the person who was responsible for Maya's death. Maya agrees. Rachana, with the help of Nayak, tries to find the person who moved the blocks on the day of Maya's accident. They find out the phone number and address of the person who moved the block. Rachana writes this on a balloon and leaves it on the flyover for Maya to find. She then invites her boyfriend Aditya for dinner.

During dinner, Rachana tries to call the number she found earlier. It turns out to be Aditya's work mobile number. Devastated, she confronts Aditya and informs him that due to his negligence a mother and daughter lost their lives. Aditya says it was not him who made the u-turn. He merely exchanged his bike with his friend. In the final twist, it is revealed that the man who moved the block was Maya's own husband. Maya's ghost is waiting in Aditya's house to kill him when Maya's husband whom Rachana has informed about the events turns up and explains to Maya that it was because of him that they lost their lives. He then tries to commit suicide by jumping from the balcony. Maya's ghost saves him and tells him that his punishment is to suffer in this world without his wife and daughter.

== Cast ==
- Shraddha Srinath as Rachana
- Roger Narayan as Sub-inspector Nayak
- Radhika Chetan as Maya
- Dileep Raj as Aditya
- Skanda Ashok as Ritesh
- Krishna Hebbale as Inspector Sudhakar
- Pratibha Nandakumar as lady constable Sarojamma
- Pramod Shetty as Sundar
- Aarna Kulkarni as Aarna
- Chethan D'Souza as Raju
- Kennedi Gopalan as the homeless flyover man
- Ram Manjjonaath as Police Officer Muddanna
- Rajath Mayee as auto rickshaw driver
- Surya Vasishta as Doctor

== Production ==
According to the director, the script of the movie took place on the road. He says, "U-Turn happened in July when I used to drop my daughter Lucy to school and traffic used to be high. I used to park in front of her school for more than an hour and used the time to write the script."

U-Turn was produced under Pawan Kumar's then newly launched banner PK Studios, has Poornachandra Tejaswi's music, Satya Hegde, Advitha Gurumurthy and Siddharth Nuni's cinematography and Suresh's editing.

== Reception ==
Sunayana Suresh of The Times of India rated the film four out of five, and wrote, "The film can be read on philosophical and symbolic levels with leitmotifs and whatnot, but the triumph is that it even appeals to the lay viewer who seeks thrill and entertainment and nothing more." Shyam Prasad S of Bangalore Mirror wrote, "It is what happens post interval that makes or breaks any film. Here, Pawan Kumar takes the easier route and robs U-Turn of becoming a great film." J Hurtado of ScreenAnarchy wrote, "Pawan Kumar's U TURN Will Keep You Guessing Until The Last Minute. U-Turn is a film that constantly challenges and defies categorization in the service of telling its own story."

== Remakes ==
U Turn was remade in Malayalam in 2017 as Careful. It was later remade into a Telugu-Tamil bilingual in 2018 with the same title by Pawan Kumar himself. The film was also officially remade in Sri Lanka in Sinhala in 2019 with the same title. The Filipino remake with the same title was released on 30 October 2020. The film was remade in Bengali as Flyover and released on 2 April 2021. The Hindi remake with the same title was released on 28 April 2023 by Ekta Kapoor. The director revealed that the rights to the Malay language remake were sold out. He also revealed that there are plans to remake the film in Chinese, Thai, Marathi and Gujarati.
