= Dhoomam (2023 film) =

2023 Indian film

- Theatrical release poster
- Directed by: Pawan Kumar
- Written by: Pawan Kumar
- Produced by: Vijay Kiragandur
- Starring: Fahadh Faasil; Aparna Balamurali; Roshan Mathew
- Cinematography: Preetha Jayaraman
- Edited by: Suresh Arumugam
- Music by: Poornachandra Tejaswi
- Production company: Hombale Films
- Distributed by: Hombale Films
- Release date: 23 June 2023
- Running time: 142 minutes
- Country: India
- Language: Malayalam
- Box office: ₹2.25 crore

Dhoomam (transl. Smoke) is a 2023 Indian Malayalam-language action thriller film written and directed by Pawan Kumar. The film was produced by Vijay Kiragandur under Hombale Films in their debut production in Malayalam cinema. It stars Fahadh Faasil and Aparna Balamurali, alongside Roshan Mathew, Vineeth, Anu Mohan, Achyuth Kumar, Joy Mathew and Nandu.

Dhoomam was released on 23 June 2023 and received mixed-to-negative reviews & became an box-office disaster

== Plot ==
Avinash and Diya are an newly married couple and all of a sudden both of them get kidnapped and are left abandoned in a hill. Avinash becomes conscious whereas Diya ishone where his car gets blasted. He takes Diya to an abandoned shed and sends a voice message to Sid.

Right after the car blast he gets a call on his phone asking him to deliver money to locations which he will specify later. The anonymous caller warns him that failure to comply will cause a bomb implanted in his throat to explode, which he demonstrates with a shared video on the phone. A frantic Avi calls his Boss Sid and asks him to arrange the cash to his location.

Once Diya regains consciousness, the movie switches back and forth between Avi's flashback and current scenario. It shows how an ambitious Avi reaches Bangalore from Kerala, his chance meeting with Diya at a roadside eatery which eventually develops into a relationship and how his Boss Sid recruits him after they meet in the same eatery run by Avi's friend, who was impressed with Avi's marketing knowledge. After an interview, he is hired as a marketing head of Sid's cigarette company. Once hired, Avi quickly increases the company sales with his strategies and becomes Sid's trusted aide. Once Sid's father, the company owner, decides to retire, he appoints Sid as the new boss, much to the chagrin of his brother Praveen.

Back to the present, Avi notices a car coming outside the shed they are in and starts checking for money. Suddenly, someone starts shooting him. Avi barely escapes and finds a gun in the car trunk. He shoots and kills the anonymous killer, and he falls into a cliff amidst their struggles. Back at the shed, he plans to escape out with Diya. Avi thinks the killer was arranged by either Sid or Praveen due to their fallout with Avi

When Diya starts feeling uncomfortable, Avi reveals the truth that the bomb is actually planted in her throat, not his, and per the anonymous caller, if she keeps smoking cigarettes, she will gain one hour for each cigarette which will be reflected in the watch he left with them (with a ticking timer for the bomb). Diya has no other option but to start smoking and keep at it, while she asks the reason for this situation.

Again going to the flashback, Sid's partner, a corrupt minister, asks them to start a new cheaper brand of cigarettes, since his government is going to raise the taxes on the existing brands and they can make more money if they themselves start selling the new ones. Avi and Sid have a fallout when Avi learns that a lot of children have started using his cigarette brand because of the aggressive marketing and feel morally responsible.

Back in the present, they learn that Sid is coming back to Bangalore from his driver and kidnaps him from the airport at gunpoint. Back at the shed, they make him call Praveen to get them the money. They set off with the money from Praveen to deliver it to the two people as per the caller's address after tying up Sid and Praveen.

When the police arrive at the shed, they find Praveen dead and Sid injured. The police as well as the minister's goons start looking for Avi and Diya. They manage to deliver the money to both the recipients of the caller. Going after the recipient's family background, they start tailing the caller and finally find him to be an anonymous man with army background. Because of Avi's marketing, his daughter became a chain smoker/addict and even lost her baby due to passive smoking. It was that man's revenge

== Cast ==
- Fahadh Faasil as Avinash "Avi"
- Aparna Balamurali as Diya
- Roshan Mathew as Siddharth "Sid"
- Vineeth as Praveen
- Anu Mohan as Satya
- Achyuth Kumar as CI K. Prakash
- Vijay Menon as Ajay Varma
- Joy Mathew as Minister
- Nandu as Minister's personal assistant
- Bhanumathi Payyanur as an old lady
- Parvati Nair as a model in an anti-smoking ad
- Leenaz Samad Bicha as Prarthana
- Jerusha Christopher as Ritu

== Music ==
Dhoomam

Soundtrack album by Poornachandra Tejaswi
- Released: 13 June 2023
- Recorded: 2023
- Genre: Feature film soundtrack
- Language: Malayalam
- Label: Hombale Films

Poornachandra Tejaswi chronology
Kudi Yedamaithe (2021)	Dhoomam (2023)

The music is composed by Poornachandra Tejaswi. The lyrics are penned by Vinayak Sasikumar.

Track listing
No.	Title	Singer(s)	Length
1.	"Theeye Dhaahamo"	Kapil Kapilan	04:11
2.	"Dhoomam Title Song"	Poornachandra Tejaswi	04:10

== Production ==
Dhoomam was produced by Hombale Films and directed by Pawan Kumar. The music was composed by Poornachandra Tejaswi. The film marks the debut of Pawan Kumar, Poornachandra Tejaswi, and Hombale Films in Malayalam cinema.

== Release ==
=== Theatrical ===
The film was released on 23 June 2023.

=== Home media ===
Amazon Prime Video acquired the post-theatrical streaming rights of the film. It was supposed to release on the platform on 4 August 2023, but was delayed due to the poor response for the film. Later, Amazon Prime Video dropped and reverted the streaming rights to Hombale Films after seeing a lack of interest from the audience.

On 29 November 2023, the film was released digitally on the Apple TV app and iTunes. On 31 May 2024, on the occasion of World No Tobacco Day, the film was made available on Hombale Films' YouTube channel, for free.

== Reception ==
=== Critical response ===
Anandu Suresh of The Indian Express gave 1.5 out of 5 stars and wrote, "Dhoomam serves as a reminder that merely having a significant message is insufficient to create a captivating film." Anna M. M. Vetticad of Firstpost gave 2 out of 5 stars and wrote, "Dhoomam's message is crucial and the plot includes some twists with promise, but the film takes too long to get to them. The script is bereft of depth, zest and soul, resulting in a narrative that has limited emotional impact and lacks the urgency one would expect from the life-and-death situation at its centre." S. R. Praveen of The Hindu wrote, "Dhoomam lives up to its title in the impact it has on the audience – a whiff of smoke, and hardly anything substantial."
