= Bhujanga =

- Directed by: Jeeva
- Written by: B. A. Madhu
- Produced by: Varuna Mahesh
- Starring: Prajwal Devraj; Meghana Raj
- Cinematography: Gundlupete Suresh
- Edited by: Soundar Raj
- Music by: Poornachandra Tejaswi
- Production company: Nagamale Movies
- Release date: 15 July 2016
- Country: India
- Language: Kannada

Bhujanga is a 2016 Indian Kannada romance film written by B. A. Madhu and directed by Jeeva. It was produced by Varuna Mahesh under his production company, Nagamale Movies. It stars Prajwal Devraj and Meghana Raj. The supporting cast features Sadhu Kokila, Bullet Prakash, Jai Jagadish, Tabla Nani, Santhosh and Padma Vasanthi. The film was released on 15 July 2016.

== Cast ==
- Prajwal Devaraj as Bhujanga
- Meghana Raj as Rachana
- Sadhu Kokila
- Bullet Prakash as Basya
- Jai Jagadish
- Tabla Nani
- Santhosh
- Padma Vasanthi
- Kalyani Raju
- Chitra Shenoy
- Kuri Prathap
- Mico Nagaraj
- Mico Shivu
- Aishwarya Shindogi in an item song

== Production ==
The shooting of the movie commenced in May 2015 and finished in December 2015. It was shot in Bangalore, Mysore and some locations of Mangalore.

== Soundtrack ==
The music of the movie has been composed by Poornachandra Tejaswi of Lucia fame. The movie has five songs.

Bhujanga (soundtrack)

Studio album by Poornachandra Tejaswi
- Released: 2016
- Genre: Feature film soundtrack

Track list
No.	Title	Lyrics	Singer(s)	Length
1.	"Heartige Kanna"	Poornachandra Tejaswi	Vijay Prakash	4:36
2.	"Alibaba"	V. Nagendra Prasad	Naveen Sajju, Bappi Blossom	4:10
3.	"Nalle Enutha"	Jayanth Kaikini	Sonu Nigam, Sridevi	5:40
4.	"Hero Cycle"	Arasu Anthare	Sangeetha Rajeev, Hemanth	5:14
5.	"Preethine Dyavru"	Arasu Anthare	Naveen Sajju, Ananya Bhat	5:01
