= Flyover (film) =

2021 Indian Bengali thriller film

- Official release poster
- Directed by: Abhimanyu Mukherjee
- Screenplay by: Abhimanyu Mujherjee
- Story by: Pawan Kumar
- Produced by: Nishpal Singh
- Starring: Koel Mallick; Gaurav Chakrabarty
- Cinematography: Souvik Basu
- Edited by: Rabiranjan Maitra
- Music by: Binitranjan Moitra
- Production company: Surinder Films
- Release date: 2 April 2021
- Country: India
- Language: Bengali

Flyover is a 2021 Indian Bengali language supernatural thriller film directed by Abhimanyu Mukherjee that stars Koel Mallick, Gaurav Chakrabarty, Ravi Shaw, Shantilal Mukherjee, Koushik Roy, Poulomi Das in the lead roles. The film is written by Abhimanyu Mukherjee and produced by Nispal Singh under the banner of Surinder Films. The film is an official remake of the 2016 Kannada film U Turn. It was released on 2 April 2021.

== Plot ==
Bidisha, a young lady journalist, is preparing a story on traffic rule violations. While crossing the flyover she contacts a footpath inhabitant for information about the rule breaker. One night, police arrest her for murder.

== Cast ==
- Koel Mullick as Bidisha
- Gaurav Chakrabarty as SI Amit Sen
- Shantilal Mukherjee as ACP
- Koushik Roy as Palash Bose
- Poulomi Das
- Ravi Shaw as Ranjan, Bidisha's boyfriend

== Soundtrack ==
Track listing
No.	Title	Singer	Length
1.	"Moner Modhye Bhoy"	Anupam Roy	3:18
