= Yuva (2024 film) =

- Theatrical release poster
- Directed by: Santhosh Ananddram
- Written by: Santhosh Ananddram
- Produced by: Vijay Kiragandur
- Starring: Yuva Rajkumar; Sapthami Gowda
- Cinematography: Shreesha Kuduvalli
- Edited by: Ashish Kusugolli
- Music by: B. Ajaneesh Loknath
- Production company: Hombale Films
- Release date: 29 March 2024
- Country: India
- Language: Kannada
- Box office: ₹19.40 crore

Yuva is a 2024 Indian Kannada-language action drama film directed by Santhosh Ananddram and produced by Vijay Kiragandur under Hombale Films. The film, which marks the fourth collaboration of Ananddram and Hombale Films, stars Yuva Rajkumar in his lead acting debut, while Sapthami Gowda, Achyuth Kumar, Gopalkrishna Deshpande, Sudharani and Kishore appear in supporting roles.

Yuva was released on 29 March 2024 and received mixed to positive reviews from critics. It was the eighth highest-grossing Kannada film of 2024.

== Plot ==
Yuva, a national-level wrestler, lives in Bangalore with his father Shankar, mother Girija and elder sister Shwetha. He is banned from wrestling after being accused of involvement in a matchfixing scam with his coach, Veeranna Doddamani, causing a rift with Shankar. Unable to pursue wrestling, Yuva joins an engineering college in Mangalore, where he frequently fights with local students.

After graduating, Yuva returns home and discovers that Shankar has left following Shwetha's marriage. He also learns that Shankar borrowed heavily from friends, colleagues and loan sharks to support the family. With his college record damaging his employment prospects, Yuva works as a food delivery boy and begins to accept his responsibility for supporting the family.

Yuva eventually finds Shankar in Gokarna, where he learns that Shankar invested the borrowed money in the stock market but was deceived by marketeers who never invested it in shares. Yuva recovers the money and settles the family's debts. Meanwhile, Doddamani captures the real culprit behind the matchfixing scam, leading to the bans on both himself and Yuva being rescinded.

Yuva resumes training for the championship and ultimately wins it. Despite becoming a wrestling champion, he continues working as a delivery boy, earning Shankar's respect.

== Cast ==
- Yuva Rajkumar as Yuva
- Sapthami Gowda as Siri
- Achyuth Kumar as Shankar, Yuva's father
- Sudharani as Girija, Yuva's mother
- Hitha Chandrashekar as Shwetha, Yuva's sister
- Gopalkrishna Deshpande as College Principal
- Sundeep Malani
- Kishore as Veeranna Doddamani
- Harshith. K as Harshith, Yuva's Friend

== Soundtrack ==
Yuva

Soundtrack album by B. Ajaneesh Loknath
- Genre: Feature film soundtrack
- Language: Kannada
- Label: Anand Audio
- Producers: B. Ajaneesh Loknath, C. R. Bobby

Singles from Yuva
- 1. "Obbane Shiva Obbane Yuva" Released: 2 March 2024; 2. "Kavithe Kavithe" Released: 9 March 2024; 3. "Appuge" Released: 15 March 2024; 4. "Baduku Ondu Ranaranga" Released: 3 April 2024; 5. "Baanadari" Released: 11 April 2024

B. Ajaneesh Loknath composed the soundtrack album for the film.

| No. | Title | Lyrics | Singer(s) | Length |
|---|---|---|---|---|
| 1. | "Obbane Shiva Obbane Yuva" | Santhosh Ananddram | Nakash Aziz, Shashank Sheshagiri | 3:55 |
| 2. | "Kavithe Kavithe" | Pramod Maravanthe | Sanjith Hegde | 3:35 |
| 3. | "Appuge" | Santhosh Ananddram | Vijay Prakash | 3:01 |
| 4. | "Baduku Ondu Ranaranga" | Santhosh Ananddram | Vyasaraj Sosale | 4:27 |
| 5. | "Baanadari" | Pramod Maravanthe | Siddhartha Belmannu | 3:29 |
| 6. | "Yuva Title Teaser Theme" | - | - | 1:12 |

== Release ==
Yuva was initially scheduled to be released on 22 December 2023, but was postponed to 29 March 2024 for unknown reasons. It was released in over 350 theatres across the state.

== Reception ==
=== Critical response ===
SM Shashiprasad of Times Now gave 3/5 stars and wrote "Yuva works on some counts. However, it lacks the punch required to make it a more powerful venture than just being another run-of-the-mill entertainer." S. Sridevi of The Times of India gave 3/5 stars and wrote "Yuva is a power-packed family entertainer that can be enjoyed in theatres by all kinds of film buffs as it offers something for everyone." A. Sharadhaa of The New Indian Express gave 3/5 stars and wrote "Yuva serves as a gritty exploration of a young man's journey. While it may slightly falter in its execution in parts, the film's sincerity and earnestness ultimately shine through."

A. S. Pranati of Deccan Herald gave 2/5 stars and wrote "Yuva is an action-packed entertainer, but is let down by too many elements." Prathiba Joy of OTTplay gave 1.5/5 stars and wrote "The story of director Santhosh Ananddram's debut vehicle for Yuva Rajkumar only picks up in the second half, and doesn't have much meat to chew on."

Vivek M. V. of The Hindu wrote "The debutant actor is dashing in action sequences, but director Santhosh Ananddram's routine story stops this film from being an all-out entertainer." Swaroop Kodur of Film Companion wrote "Yuva is an interesting film and has many memorable moments to its name, but the film is definitely not greater than the sum of its parts."

=== Box office ===
The first day worldwide gross was speculated to be around ₹4–5 crore. However, the tracked figures estimate the first weekend net collections to be ₹6 crores. The net collection of the film was reported to be ₹10.81 crores for the first two weeks. The final collections were reported to be ₹19.40 crores.
