= Raghu Thatha =

2024 film by Suman Kumar

- Theatrical release poster
- Directed by: Suman Kumar
- Written by: Suman Kumar
- Produced by: Vijay Kiragandur
- Starring: Keerthy Suresh; M. S. Bhaskar; Ravindra Vijay; Devadarshini
- Cinematography: Yamini Yagnamurthy
- Edited by: T. S. Suresh
- Music by: Sean Roldan
- Production company: Hombale Films
- Release date: 15 August 2024
- Running time: 135 minutes
- Country: India
- Language: Tamil

Raghu Thatha (/ˈrəɡuθɑːθɑː/ transl. Grandfather Raghu) is a 2024 Indian Tamil-language political comedy film written and directed by Suman Kumar, in his directorial debut. The film is produced by Vijay Kiragandur under Hombale Films, in their first Tamil venture. It stars Keerthy Suresh, alongside M. S. Bhaskar, Ravindra Vijay, Devadarshini, Anandsami, Rajeev Ravindranathan, Jayakumar, Aadhira Pandilakshmi, Janaki and Rajesh Balachandran. The film revolves around a feminist who struggles to maintain her principles in a patriarchal society.

Raghu Thatha was officially announced in December 2022. Principal photography commenced the same month and wrapped by late May 2023. The film has music composed by Sean Roldan, cinematography handled by Yamini Yagnamurthy and editing by T. S. Suresh. Raghu Thatha was released in theatres on 15 August 2024, coinciding with India's Independence Day.

== Plot ==
Kayalvizhi Pandian, an upper-division clerk at the Valluvenpettai branch of the Madras Central Bank, is a fervent feminist and anti-Hindi imposition activist. She also writes stories under the male pseudonym "Ka. Pandian", as female authors are met with low readership. Previously, Kayal and her grandfather, Raghothaman "Raghu Thatha", had successfully shut down the Bharathiya Bhasha Ekta Sabha, a Hindi organisation run by Ranganathan in their village, a feat celebrated by the villagemen. Her parents are now pressuring her to marry soon, which she refuses. Kayal receives a promotion with two conditions: a transfer to the Calcutta branch and passing the Hindi Pratmika exam.

Meanwhile, Dr. Chandrasekar recommends that Raghothaman undergo a barium swallow test in town due to his stomach pain. The test reveals stomach cancer, and Raghothaman begins treatment at the Madras Cancer Institute. Distraught, Raghothaman expresses three final wishes: to savour biryani at Buhari Hotel in Madras, take a photo with M. G. Ramachandran, and see Kayal married. To fulfill her grandfather's last wish, Kayal reluctantly agrees to marry, despite disliking the suitors her family presents. She proposes to Tamilselvan "Selvan", an engineer older by seven years and friend who shares her progressive values and works on transmission towers for the benefit of the people. However, Kayal becomes upset when she receives an anonymous letter; the writer reveals they know her true identity as a female writer using a male pseudonym. Suspecting Selvan, she discovers his regressive nature from his diary and realises she must escape the marriage. Her brother Shankar suggests clearing the Hindi exam and transferring to Calcutta, despite her ideological reservations.

Kayal and her friend Alamelu plan to learn Hindi from Suneel, their bank peon. Meanwhile, Selvan grows suspicious of Kayal's secretive behaviour and avoidance. She requests an early exam date from her manager, Ashish Gupta, who arranges it. Kayal and Shankar devise a plan to find someone to impersonate her for the exam. Selvan follows Kayal to the exam centre in Sitrur, far from Valluvanpettai. Kayal smuggles out the question paper, which is taken back to their village for Suneel to answer. After overcoming numerous obstacles, the completed answer sheet reaches the exam hall just in time. Selvan confronts Kayal, questioning her, but she responds boldly, and he leaves, seemingly angry. Kayal hopes this will prompt him to call off the marriage. However, Selvan discovers from his mother that Kayal has seen his diary, where he had expressed his anger and understands of her plan to stop the marriage. He meets Kayal and feigns reform, accepting whatever decision she makes, thus foiling her plan again. Meanwhile, Ranganathan has been trying to reopen the Valluvanpettai Hindi Sabha for two years, seeking revenge for the humiliation he suffered at the hands of Kayal, finally obtains permission and also receives an anonymous letter from Selvan, revealing that Kayal took the Hindi exam for promotion and that her marriage plans are underway.

As the wedding preparations progress, Kayal's sister-in-law, Poongothai, suggests abducting the groom. An anonymous letter, supposedly from "Suman", lures the groom to an isolated place, where he is beaten and locked up. Kayal is relieved that the marriage has been stopped, but Selvan unexpectedly reappears, and the proceedings resume. Ranganathan crashes the wedding to announce the reopening of the Hindi Sabha, prompting Kayal to interrupt the ceremony and vow to stop him. She reveals that she took the Hindi exam solely to prevent her marriage. When Selvan claims ignorance about the reason for stopping the marriage and innocently asks for an explanation, Kayal accuses him of being impotent, hoping to provoke his true intentions. Selvan's anger gets the better of him, and he reveals his true male chauvinistic nature. Kayal retaliates by comparing the imposition of marriage on her to the imposition of Hindi, highlighting the parallels between the two. Meanwhile, the doctor discloses that Raghothaman's stomach issues were misdiagnosed as cancer, and Raghothaman slaps him for the prolonged confusion. Despite his earlier pretenses, Selvan still attempts to portray himself as reformed, but his mother sees through the facade and slaps him, ending the marriage.

Later while Kayal sits at a bus stop, an ardent reader named Kamal, (Note: The character, credited as "Kamal Haa", begins to introduce himself but the sound of a bus obscures his full name.) inspired by Ka. Pandian's feminist and progressive stories, expresses a desire to meet the author. Kayal reveals herself as Ka. Pandian, finally shedding her anonymity.

== Cast ==
- Keerthy Suresh as Kayalvizhi "Kayal" Pandian / Ka. Pandian
- M. S. Bhaskar as Raghothaman "Raghu Thatha"
- Ravindra Vijay as Tamilselvan "Selvan"
- Devadarshini as Alamelu
- Anandsami as Ranganathan
- Rajeev Ravindranathan as Ashish Guptha
- Jayakumar as Sundarapandian
- Aadhira Pandilakshmi as Lakshmiammal
- Janaki as Tamilselvan's mother
- Rajesh Balachandran as Shankar
- Ismath Banu as Poongothai
- K. S. Mippu as Kozhi
- Mukesh as Suruli
- Chu Khoy Sheng as Suneel Kumar Lepcha
- Manoj Kumar Kalaivanan as Dr. Chandrasekhar
- Sacchin as Kamal Haa (guest appearance)

== Production ==
In late November 2022, it was reported that the Kannada production house Hombale Films would produce a venture in Tamil, its first in that language. Keerthy Suresh was reported to play the lead role, while M. S. Bhaskar would be a part of the supporting cast. On 4 December, Vijay Kiragandur, owner of the production house, publicly announced the project through his and the houses' social media accounts. Suman Kumar, who previously co-wrote the streaming series The Family Man would be making his directorial debut with the film titled Raghu Thatha featuring Keerthy in the lead role. The film's title is based on "raghu thatha", a mispronounced line from the dialogue "Ek gaav mein ek kisaan rahata tha" (transl. In a village there lived a farmer) from Indru Poi Naalai Vaa (1981). Cinematography was handled by Yamini Yagnamurthy and editing by T. S. Suresh. Principal photography commenced in December 2022, and wrapped by late May.

== Music ==
The music is composed by Sean Roldan. The first single "Aruge Vaa" was released on 21 July 2024. The second single "Ek Gaon Mein" was released on 29 July 2024. The third single "Poruthhiru Selva" was released on 5 August 2024.

Track listing
No.	Title	Singer(s)	Length
1.	"Aruge Vaa"	Sean Roldan
2.	"Ek Gaon Mein"	Gana Vimala, Bhagyam Shankar
3.	"Poruthhiru Selva"	S. P. Charan, Sean Roldan, Manoj Kumar Kalaivanan
4.	"Ezhundhu Nindru Poridu"	M. M. Manasi, Suman Kumar, Sean Roldan
5.	"Thengai Vilundha Kadha"	Ananthuz Sean Roldan

== Release ==
Raghu Thatha was released in theatres on 15 August 2024, coinciding with India's Independence Day. It began streaming on ZEE5 from 13 September 2024.

== Critical reception ==
M. Suganth of The Times of India gave 3.5/5 stars and wrote, "the film's biggest charm is the light touch that Suman brings to a premise that could have easily become a heavy-duty drama. Part of the credit for this should also go to his composer Sean Roldan, whose jaunty score helps the director present even something as tragic as cancer with complete insouciance". Avinash Ramachandran of The Indian Express rated the film 2.5/5 stars and wrote the film "doesn’t always work because there is many a slip between the joke and the laugh".

Anusha Sundar of OTTPlay gave 2.5/5 stars and wrote, "Raghu Thatha has got delicious plotlines, and has definitely got something going on. The sub-plots become interconnected, but the extent to which they are fleshed out, result to be middling. Certain one-liners work, and Keerthy Suresh manages to take most of the weight on her shoulders, but the film falls short of being a whole-heartedly satisfying film". Janani K of India Today gave 2/5 stars and wrote, "Despite its potential, Raghuthatha falls short of being a brilliant satire on Hindi imposition and patriarchy".

Jayabhuvaneshwari B of Cinema Express rated 2/5 stars and wrote "Raghu Thatha boasts strong performances but falters in its inconsistent narrative and underdeveloped ideologies, leaving the audience confused and unsatisfied despite promising moments". Latha Srinivasan of Hindustan Times wrote, "On the whole, Raghu Thatha is a misfire and a tiresome watch that neither makes us laugh nor cheer for Kayal".
