= Raghavendra Stores =

2023 film by Santhosh Ananddram

- Theatrical release poster
- Directed by: Santhosh Ananddram
- Written by: Santhosh Ananddram
- Produced by: Vijay Kiragandur
- Starring: Jaggesh; Shwetha Srivatsav
- Cinematography: Shreesha Kuduvalli
- Edited by: Deepu S. Kumar
- Music by: B. Ajaneesh Loknath
- Production company: Hombale Films
- Distributed by: Hombale Films
- Release date: 28 April 2023
- Running time: 104 minutes
- Country: India
- Language: Kannada

Raghavendra Stores is a 2023 Indian Kannada-language comedy drama film written and directed by Santhosh Ananddram, and produced by Vijay Kiragandur under the banner Hombale Films, which marks the third collaboration of Santhosh Ananddram and Hombale Films after Raajakumara and Yuvarathnaa. The film stars Jaggesh, Shwetha Srivatsav, H. G. Dattatreya, Ravishankar Gowda, Mithra and Achyuth Kumar. The music was composed by B. Ajaneesh Loknath, while the cinematography and editing were handled by Shreesha Kuduvalli and Deepu. S. Kumar respectively.

Raghavendra Stores was theatrically released on 28 April 2023, where it received positive reviews from critics.

== Plot ==
Hayavadana is 40-year old diligent bachelor in Malnad, who works as a cook in his father Gunda Bhat's hotel "Raghavendra Stores" and also provides food for an orphanage. Everytime Hayavadana tries to impress prospective brides, they reject him due to his age and profession, even his younger brother is married. One day, Hayavadana saves Vaijayanthi, a carnatic vocalist from an embarrassing situation at a wedding reception, where Raghavendra Stores is assigned to do catering. After a few circumstances, Hayavadana and Vaijayanthi get married, but an astrologer advises the couple to maintain distance for three days due to religious beliefs. Days later, Hayavadana and Vaijayanthi leave for a resort at Thirthahalli in order to consummate their marriage.

Meanwhile, Hayavadana's friend "Catch" Kumar, an aspiring publicity-hungry politician and his men, arrive at the resort in order to bring the Council of Ministers to office as they plan to destabilize the government. Due to this, Kumar becomes an MLA candidate. Having learnt about Hayavadana's secret trip as Kumar's men accidentally kidnapped Hayavadana, Gunda Bhat sends Hayavadana and Vaijayanthi on a honeymoon, where the two finally consummate their marriage. However, Hayavadana and Vaijayanthi learn that they cannot bear children and decide to opt for surrogacy.

Ramachandra, a photographer and Kumar's aide, takes photos of Kumar having an extramarital affair with a party worker and sends it to the media, as Kumar humiliated Ramachandra due to his status as a politician. Having learnt this, Kumar decides to set the orphanage on fire in order to divert the media's attention. However, Hayavadana and his friends manage to expose Kumar's involvement in the fire accident and in providing spoilt food in the name of social service. Kumar escapes in fear of getting arrested, while Hayavadana and Vaijayanthi adopt two children instead of opting for surrogacy.

== Cast ==
- Jaggesh as Hayavadana
- Shwetha Srivatsav as Vaijayanthi
- H. G. Dattatreya as Gunda Bhat
- Achyuth Kumar as Kumar
- Ravishankar Gowda as Madhu
- Mithra as HS Manjunatha "Kogile"
- Seetha Kote as Ashrama's manager
- Chitkala Biradar as Alamelamma, Vaijayanthi's mother
- Raghu Pandeshwar as Ramachandra, a photographer
- Raghu Shivamogga as Kumar's henchmen
- Rajini as Subbalakshmi

== Soundtrack ==
Raghavendra Stores

Soundtrack album by B. Ajaneesh Loknath
- Released: 2023
- Recorded: 2021–2023
- Studio: Hombale Films
- Genre: Feature film soundtrack
- Length: 7:11
- Language: Kannada
- Label: Hombale Films
- Producer: B. Ajaneesh Loknath

B. Ajaneesh Loknath chronology
Gurudev Hoysala (2023)	Raghavendra Stores (2023)	Virupaksha (2023)

The soundtrack album and score were composed by B. Ajaneesh Loknath. The first song "Single Sundara" was released on 12 April 2023 as 'Singles anthem of the year', which was penned by Santhosh Ananddram and Vijay Prakash, Naveen Sajju have lent their voice to the song.

Track listing
No.	Title	Lyrics	Singer(s)	Length
1.	"Single Sundara"	Santhosh Ananddram, Nagarjuna Sharma	Vijay Prakash, Naveen Sajju	3:28
2.	"Gaalige Gandha"	Ghouse Peer	B. Ajaneesh Loknath	3:43
Total length:				7:11

== Release ==
The film was released theatrically on 28 April 2023 across Karnataka.

=== Home media ===
The satellite and digital rights were sold to Star Suvarna and Amazon Prime Video. The film was streamed on Prime Video from 18 May 2023 and On 23 July, at 6:30 pm, it will be broadcast on Star Suvarna.
