= Bagheera (2024 film) =

2024 Kannada film by Dr. Suri

- Theatrical release poster
- Directed by: Dr. Suri
- Screenplay by: Dr. Suri
- Story by: Prashanth Neel
- Produced by: Vijay Kiragandur
- Starring: Sriimurali; Rukmini Vasanth; Prakash Raj; Achyuth Kumar; Rangayana Raghu; Garuda Ram; Pramod Shetty; Sudha Rani; Sharath Lohitashwa
- Cinematography: Arjun Shetty
- Edited by: Pranav Sri Prasad
- Music by: B. Ajaneesh Loknath
- Production company: Hombale Films
- Release date: 31 October 2024
- Running time: 158 minutes
- Country: India
- Language: Kannada
- Budget: ₹20 crore
- Box office: est.₹30 crore

Bagheera is a 2024 Indian Kannada-language superhero film written and directed by Dr. Suri, from a story by Prashanth Neel, and produced by Vijay Kiragandur. It stars Sriimurali, alongside Rukmini Vasanth, Prakash Raj, Sudha Rani, Ramachandra Raju, Achyuth Kumar and Rangayana Raghu. The music was composed by B. Ajaneesh Loknath, while the cinematography and editing were handled by Arjun Shetty and Pranav Sri Prasad.

Bagheera was released on 31 October 2024, coinciding with Diwali, and received positive reviews from critics. The film grossed over ₹30 crore (US$3.1 million).

== Plot ==
Narrative structure
- Chapter 1: I Will Be A Super Hero
- Chapter 2: Birth Of A Vigilante
- Chapter 3: Twist In The Tale
- Chapter 4: Catch Me If You Can
- Chapter 5: Hunting Time
- Chapter 6: Do or Die
- Chapter 7: The Final Showdown
- Chapter 8: I Am Not Done Yet

A young Vedanth Prabhakar aspires to become a superhero, but he later decides to become a police officer after his mother, before dying from cancer, tells him that ordinary people are real superheroes, especially police officers. Vedanth decides to become a police officer like his father Prabhakar.

Years later, Vedanth completes his police training and gets posted in Mangalore, where he meets Sneha, an independent doctor, and develops feeling towards her. Sneha also falls for Vedanth and they get engaged. One day, Vedanth organizes a police operation and arrests several gangsters in the city, but they are released due to corrupt higher officials, and Vedanth is shocked to learn that his father is also on the take. One day, Vedanth witnesses a girl committing suicide by burning herself to death and learns that she was sexually assaulted. Due to this incident, Vedanth wears a superhero costume at night, calling himself Bagheera, and brutally kills the culprits. Vedanth pretends to be a corrupt officer to avoid suspicion and starts eradicating criminals as Bagheera, with the help of Narayana, a head constable.

Meanwhile, several people are kidnapped and about to be secretly transported in a container at the port area by Kotian. Vedanth, after receiving missing complaints in the station, goes to the port area as Bagheera. Kotian and his gang spot Bagheera and a shootout ensues, where Bagheera manages to escape despite being shot. Vedanth seeks Sneha's help, and after recovering, he goes to Kotian's house and finds Kotian's family dead, murdered by Kotian himself. Kotian reveals that he did not want them to get killed by Rana, a crime boss running an organ trafficking ring, and then commits suicide.

Guru, a CBI officer, is transferred to Mangalore by his brother Ramakanth Appayya, the director of the CBI, to exact revenge on Bagheera for killing his son Siddhi. Siddhi was a corrupt police officer and involved in killing Ranganna, an honest journalist, which led Bagheera to kill Siddhi. Guru begins his investigation to uncover Bagheera's identity. Vedanth, as Bagheera, appoints a hacker, a boy electronics expert, and a drunkard expert in making bombs and gadgets into providing him with a costume, weapons, a mask and a bike, and begins to destroy Rana's organ trafficking business. Rana lays a trap for Bagheera, but Bagheera escapes and kills Rana's men with the help of his gadgets. Vedanth seeks Sneha's help again, and their love grows more stronger.

Guru soon deduces Vedanth's identity as Bagheera, but a mole in Guru's team informs Rana about it. Rana kidnaps Sneha and gives Vedanth two choices: save Sneha from getting killed, or save a container containing several people from falling into the sea. With a heavy heart, Vedanth chooses to save the container, while Sneha gets brutally tortured and killed by Rana.

Vedanth gets arrested by Guru and is transported to be killed in an encounter. Rana loads the people into a train to Sri Lanka. However, the officers release Vedanth, under Guru's orders, and kill Rana's mole. Guru lies to Ramakanth that Bagheera has escaped again after learning about Siddhi's corruption, and reveals Rana's location to Vedanth. Vedanth arrives at the goods train and kills Rana, avenging Sneha's death. The kidnappees safely return and reunite with their families, while Vedanth leaves on a bus. Guru meets Central Minister Ramaswamy, reveals the latter's involvement with Rana, and tells him to resign from his post and surrender. When Ramaswamy refuses, Guru promises that Bagheera will hunt him down.

== Cast ==
- Sriimurali as DSP Vedanth Prabhakar IPS / Bagheera
- Rukmini Vasanth as Dr. Sneha
- Prakash Raj as Guru, a CBI officer
- Sudha Rani as Vedanth's mother
- Achyuth Kumar as Prabhakar, Vedanth's father
- Ramachandra Raju as Rana
- Rangayana Raghu as Narayana
- Avinash Yelandur as Ramakanth Appayya
- Sharath Lohithaswa as Central Minister Ramaswamy
- Pramod Shetty as Kotian
- Prakash Thuminad as Govinda
- Puneeth Rudranag as Yogi

== Production ==
The title Bagheera was inspired by a character from The Jungle Book. The film was announced in December 2020. Principal photography began with a muhurat shot on 20 May 2022 at Bangalore. The film was mainly shot in Hyderabad and in the outskirts of Bangalore, Visakhapatnam and Mysore. Some key portions were shot in Goa in October 2022. Sriimurali suffered a bone fracture and muscle tear in his knee, while filming an action sequence in January 2023. Shooting resumed in May 2023. In April 2024, Sriimurali was again injured for the second time. The film's principal photography wrapped by July 2024.

== Soundtrack ==
The music and background score was composed by B. Ajaneesh Loknath. The audio rights were withheld by Hombale Films and released under their own channel.

Track listing
No.	Title	Lyrics	Singer(s)	Length
1.	"Parichayavade"	Pramod Maravanthe	Rithesh G. Rao	2:10
2.	"Rudhira Dhaara"	Aniruddha Shastry	Aniruddha Shastry	3:32
3.	"Shiva Stotra"	Kinnal Raj	Sai Veda Vagdevi	2:51
4.	"Stun Gun"	Anoop Bhandari	Aniruddha Sastry, Amogh Balaji	3:36
5.	"Kannalli Kannidu"	Pramod Maravanthe	Harshika Devanath	4:38
Total length:				21:33

== Marketing ==
The teaser trailer of the film was released on 17 December 2023 on the occasion of Sriimurali's birthday. The trailer of the film was released on 21 October 2024.

== Release ==
=== Theatrical ===
The film was released on 31 October 2024, coinciding with Deepavali in its original Kannada language, along with its Telugu-dubbed version. The film was earlier stated to release in mid-2023, but was later postponed for unknown reasons.

=== Home media ===
The digital rights of the film were sold to Netflix. The film began streaming on Netflix from 21 November 2024 in Kannada and dubbed versions of Tamil, Telugu and Malayalam languages as it is being the first Kannada movie to stream on Netflix. The Hindi dubbed version began streaming on Disney+ Hotstar from 25 December 2024.

== Reception ==
Prathibha Joy of OTTplay gave 4/5 stars and wrote "Bagheera is well-written, well-executed and well-acted. Yes, it is dark in tone, but not in the Neel template. It’s a film about a vigilante who operates at night. It is action-heavy and leaves one wanting more." S. Sridevi of The Times of India gave 3.5/5 stars and wrote "Bagheera offers a good theatrical experience and now is a good time to roll a red-carpet to our very own homegrown superhero, Bagheera."

Shashiprasad SM of Times Now gave 3.5/5 stars and wrote "Are you a superhero fan who loves watching the good guy take down villains to save the day? Then this "namma" very own superhero, Bagheera is here, armed with just the right powers to deliver justice his way—no compromises till the end." Pranathi A.S of Deccan Herald gave 3.5/5 stars and wrote "Bagheera is a well-made action drama with a gripping screenplay. Prashanth Neel’s ability to write a simple yet engrossing story is commendable."

A. Sharadhaa of The New Indian Express gave 3/5 stars and wrote "Writer-director Dr Suri crafts a superhero who is both relatable and infused with commercial appeal, essential for an overall entertaining experience, albeit one that treads familiar ground." Sanjay Ponnappa of India Today gave 3/5 stars and wrote "Bagheera is worth a watch and makes for a thrilling theatre experience this Diwali. Fans of the superhero genre, don’t miss this “Desi Batman x Black Panther” film. Concepts like this are rare in India, and Bagheera certainly deserves appreciation; with a pinch of patience and understanding."

Vivek M.V of The Hindu wrote "Directed by Dr Suri, Srii Murali’s ‘Bagheera’ is an entertaining superhero story of a masked vigilante, elevated by Chethan D'Souza's stunts and Ajaneesh Loknath's terrific score." Latha Srinivasan of Hindustan Times wrote "Bagheera is a homegrown Batman film that is mostly entertaining and a new genre for Kannada filmgoers to explore."

=== Box office ===
Bagheera grossed ₹3.8 crore (US$390,000) worldwide on its opening day, with the Kannada version alone collecting ₹2.95 crore (US$310,000). The film then earned ₹4 crore (US$420,000) on the second day, ₹4.15 crore (US$430,000) on the third day, and ₹3.8 crore (US$390,000) on the Sunday day, bringing the total to ₹15.65 crore (US$1.6 million) over the four-day long weekend. After the first week, the movie's worldwide gross stands at ₹22.4 crore (US$2.3 million), including ₹20 crore (US$2.1 million) from Karnataka alone. The Telugu version was reported to have grossed ₹1.40 crore (US$150,000) in the first weekend. Movie collected ₹29 crore (US$3.0 million) in two week theatrical run. The final collections were reported to be ₹29.50 crores.
