= Masterpiece (2015 film) =

2015 Indian film by Manju Mandavya

- Theatrical release poster
- Directed by: Manju Mandavya
- Written by: Manju Mandavya
- Produced by: Vijay Kiragandur
- Starring: Yash; Shanvi Srivastava; Suhasini Maniratnam
- Cinematography: Vaidy S
- Edited by: K. M. Prakash
- Music by: V. Harikrishna
- Production company: Hombale Films
- Distributed by: Jayanna Films
- Release date: 24 December 2015
- Running time: 158 minutes
- Country: India
- Language: Kannada
- Box office: ₹35 crore

Masterpiece is a 2015 Indian Kannada-language action comedy film directed by Manju Mandavya and produced by Vijay Kiragandur under Hombale Films. The film stars Yash, alongside Shanvi Srivastava, Suhasini Maniratnam, P. Ravi Shankar and Chikkanna. The music is composed by V. Harikrishna, while cinematography and editing were handled by Vaidy S and K. M. Prakash respectively.

Masterpiece was released on 24 December 2015, coinciding with Christmas, and became a commercial success at the box office.

== Plot ==
Yuva is a local goon who is living with his mother Durga, his sister, and his sister's son Lochan. Durga disapproves of many of Yuva's antics, and she reads him stories of Subhash Chandra Bose, Chandrashekhar Azad, and Bhagat Singh when Yuva was a child, in the hope that he would one day become like them. However, Yuva is the exact opposite. Consequently, she gives a TV interview about his upbringing and how his actions have not been good, thus giving the public the impression that Yuva is a rogue. Yuva and his friend Bruce Lee help Noor Ahmed, a local politician, to get elected in college and local elections, thus gaining political connections in the process. Alongside this, Yuva falls in love with a carefree girl named Nisha, who tests her boyfriends and lovers to find their exact nature and intentions through dating; Yuva is proven to her after she tests him. When Nisha gets caught in the middle of a chase between the police and a gangster known as Boss, Yuva knocks Boss unconscious, sending him into a coma.

After Boss is admitted to the hospital, Yuva's family begins to be threatened by Boss's henchman. Yuva's nephew Lochan is kidnapped and returned later that day unharmed. Durga gets locked in a storage closet in a temple, where Yuva saves her from intoxication. Yuva lodges a complaint to the police commissioner, only to be mocked since the police had seen his interview. Yuva realises that his family is in danger and begins to change his laid-back attitude. When Yuva and Nisha visit a mall, Nisha disappears, and Yuva receives a phone call from Boss's brother Danny; in order to save Nisha, he must help Boss escape from the hospital. Yuva does what is told, but is knocked unconscious along with Nisha, and Yuva is later framed as a drug smuggler. Noor Ahmed and Bruce Lee take Yuva and Nisha to their hideout, where they watch Durga wish for Yuva to be encounter killed by the police, before a commotion breaks out against Durga.

Yuva realizes that his family has been disrespected and plots to prove his innocence by capturing Boss and his men. Yuva captures Boss, along with Danny and his right-hand men. Yuva and Bruce Lee decide to record a video before finishing them. While Bruce Lee is recording the whole incident, Boss admits that he had corrupt cops supporting him the whole time in the cocaine trade and proclaims that India can't change. Yuva realizes Boss's point of view and takes up a stand, revealing that while he initially set out to make his mother proud, Now, he is set on making his motherland proud by proclaiming that illegal drugs will no longer be available in local stores. Yuva kills Boss and his men in Dirty Harry-style, causing him to get arrested. The video goes viral throughout the country, causing widespread support for Yuva. Durga visits him in prison and feeds carrot halwa to him; as she leaves, she finally sees Bhagat Singh in her son and becomes a proud mother.

== Cast ==
- Yash in a dual role as
  - Yuva
  - Bhagat Singh (Flashback cameo appearance)
- Shanvi Srivastava as Nisha, Yuva's love interest
- Suhasini Maniratnam as Durga, Yuva's mother
- Ravishankar as Boss, a drug mafia don
- Chikkanna as Bruce Lee, Yuva's friend
- Ananth Padmanabha as Bruce Lee's Friend
- Achyuth Kumar as Noor Ahmed
- Avinash as Prathap Sinha IPS
- Anil Kumar as Gooli Shankar
- Ekta Rathod in a Mallige (cameo appearance)
- Ayyappa P. Sharma as Danny, Boss's younger brother
- Vijay Kashi as Nisha's father
- Dhanush as himself
- Niranjan BS as himself

== Production ==
The film was announced on 21 October 2014 by producer Vijay Kiragandur, it would be titled Masterpiece and produced under his banner, Hombale Films, to coincide with the Deepavali festival. Manju Mandavya made his directorial debut, who also wrote the screenplay and dialogues for the film. On titling the film as Masterpiece, he said, "Masterpiece was a spontaneous title that somehow clicked when I was getting into the structure of the story and when the hero's character was developing in my mind." V. Harikrishna was chosen to compose the music for the film and Vaidhy was chosen as cinematographer.

=== Casting ===
During the announcement, it was also announced that Yash would play the lead role in the film and that Suhasini Maniratnam would portray the role of his mother. The director said that two actresses, Anushka Shetty and Priya Anand, were under consideration to play the female lead. Following speculations, Shanvi Srivastava was signed in late-December 2014. Chikkanna was cast in an important side role marking his 25th film in acting.

=== Filming and development ===
Filming was scheduled to begin in November or early-December 2014, following the filming of Mr. and Mrs. Ramachari, another Yash-starrer. While delayed, reports said filming was to begin in the second week of January 2015. In June 2015, it was revealed that model Ekta Rathod would make a cameo appearance in the film. In the midst of filming, The New Indian Express carried a report in July suggesting that Yash could be playing a negative role in the film, which however was not confirmed by the makers. in the course of filming in September, it was revealed that the film would incorporate elements from the life story of a revolutionary leader of British India, Bhagat Singh. A schedule in Mysore was completed, following which the song sequences were filmed.

During Shooting of a song

A celebratory song was filmed across Bengaluru, and the song appears in the movie when Yash's character falls in love. The song also features Chikkanna and Shanvi Srivastava, and over 1,500 backup dancers. The song Annange Love Aagide turned into a chartbuster.

== Soundtrack ==
Masterpiece

Soundtrack album by V. Harikrishna
- Released: 10 December 2015
- Recorded: 2015
- Genre: Feature film soundtrack
- Label: D Beats
- Producer: V. Harikrishna

The background music and soundtracks are composed by V. Harikrishna, with lyrics for the soundtrack penned by Manju Mandavya, Narthan (who later went on to direct Mufti) and Ghouse Peer. The audio launch event of Masterpiece was supposed to happen in a unique way, For the first-time the team members of Masterpiece had planned for an interesting audio release. Masterpiece music album includes 5 songs and was supposed to be released on 5 different days, starting from 2 December as follows: "Annange Love Aagidhe" (2 Dec), "I Can't Wait Baby" (4 Dec), "KD NO 1" (7 Dec), "Jaago Re Jaago" (8 Dec), "Attention Please" and trailer (10 Dec).

Track listing
No.	Title	Lyrics	Singer(s)	Length
1.	"Annange Love"	Manju Mandavya	Yash, Chikkanna	4:17
2.	"I Can't Wait Baby"	Narthan	Tippu, Indu Nagaraj	3:51
3.	"KD No. 1"	Pavan Ranadheera	Tippu, Sangeetha Ravindranath	4:38
4.	"Jaago Re Jaago"	Ghouse Peer	Kunal Ganjawala	4:10
5.	"Attention Please"	Pavan Ranadheera	Ranjith, Rahul Nambiar, Naveen Madhav	3:51
Total length:				20:47

== Reception ==
=== Critical response ===
S. Shyam Prasad of Bangalore Mirror gave 3.5/5 stars and termed that the film was "playing to the fan gallery." Shashiprasad of Deccan Chronicle gave 3/5 stars and wrote "The film is a must for Yash fans and for the actual movie buffs."

Arachana Nathan of The Hindu wrote "Masterpiece is definitely one of a kind. Not necessarily in a good way." A. Sharadhaa of The New Indian Express wrote "With rich production qualities, Masterpiece is a definite commercial potboiler and could well go beyond the lofty heights expected out of it by Yash, the director and the producer."
