= Ninnindale =

2014 Indian Kannada romantic comedy-drama film

- Theatrical release poster
- Directed by: Jayanth C. Paranjee
- Written by: M S Ramesh [dialogue]
- Screenplay by: E Gowri Shankar; Jayanth C. Paranjee
- Story by: Bhupathi Raja; Jayanth C Paranjee
- Produced by: Vijay Kiragandur
- Starring: Puneeth Rajkumar; Erica Fernandes
- Cinematography: P. G. Vinda
- Edited by: Marthand K. Venkatesh
- Music by: Mani Sharma
- Production company: Hombale Films
- Release date: 16 January 2014
- Running time: 140 minutes
- Country: India
- Language: Kannada

Ninnindale (transl. Because of you) is a 2014 Indian Kannada-language romantic comedy drama film directed by Jayanth C. Paranjee, in his directorial debut in Kannada cinema, and produced by Vijay Kirgandur under Hombale Films. The film's title is inspired by the track called Ninnindale from Puneeth Rajkumar's earlier film Milana. It stars Puneeth Rajkumar and Erica Fernandes, alongside Vinayak Joshi, Sonia Deepti, All Ok, Sadhu Kokila, Avinash Sringeri, Thilak Shekar, Bramhanandam and Shankar Melkote. The music was composed by Mani Sharma, while cinematography and editing were handled by P. G. Vinda and Marthand K. Venkatesh.

Ninnindale was released on 16 January 2014 to mixed reviews from critics.

== Plot ==
Vicky Venkatesh is from a rich Indian family based in New York. He is an adventurous person and is having fun with his friends like a perfect youth would do. Pramila is new to New York, where she gets humiliated at an interview being an Indian. She gets cheered up by Vicky and his friends and also becomes their squad member. Pramila and Vicky go trekking and sky diving together. When their adventure ends, Vicky embraces Pramila and the photos are published in local magazines. Pramila feels a strange bond towards Vicky.

One night when Vicky and Pramila are attacked by some goons, she confesses her love to Vicky, but Vicky refuses her proposal and promises to find her a suitable groom. A roller coaster ride of meeting and refusing grooms ensues, where one of them named Sachin, a police officer, embarrasses Pramila by their photograph in magazines. Pramila becomes sure that Vicky would eventually accept her. Pramila's old friend Ashok arrives in NY where he starts to woo Pramila. It is revealed that Vicky had learnt about Ashok and called him to NY to woo Pramila. Pramila learns about this, which breaks all her hope. She feels devastated and starts to ignore Vicky.

Vicky feels the void left by Pramila and feels lonely. His friend Nandu tells him that he understood the love of Pramila and wants him to accept her proposal. Vicky meets Pramila, but she gets hit by a car when she crosses the road. At the hospital, Vicky and Pramila confess their love. After their marriage Vicky comments that he would never kiss her again as his first kiss punished him with marriage. Vicky starts to work in his family business.

== Cast ==
- Puneeth Rajkumar as Vicky Venkatesh
- Erica Fernandes as Pramila, Vicky's love interest
- Sadhu Kokila as Lucky
- Vinayak Joshi as Bhaskar (Basi), Vicky's friend
- Sonia Deepti as Nandu, Vicky's friend
- All Ok as Pavan Prachar (Pappu), Vicky's friend
- Avinash Sringeri as Ashok
- Shivarudra Naik
- Avinash as Venkatesh, Vicky's father
- Prathap
- Srinivas Prabhu as Pramila's father
- Sihi Kahi Chandru as Pramila's uncle
- Nirmal G Khona
- Tulasi as Lakshmi Venkatesh, Vicky's mother
- Achyuth Kumar as Santhosh Anand, Venkatesh's brother
- Rohini as Mallika
- Thilak Shekar as Sachin from New York Police Department
- Bramhanandam as Sachin from New York Plumbing Department
- Shankar Melkote as Kumaraswamy, Venkatesh's father
- Bhargavi Narayan as Kasturi, Kumaraswamy's wife

== Production ==
Jayanth C. Paranjee initially unsuccessfully attempted to cast Malvika Raaj as the lead actress. The film script being a new generation romantic story was shot in New York City thus marking Puneeth's first long time schedule shot at a foreign locale. The launch of the film was held on 12 August 2013. The movie was shot in United States for a 35-day period.

Telugu actors Brahmanandam and Sonia Deepti played key roles. Thilak Shekar played a cop from the New York Police Department (NYPD).

== Soundtrack ==
Ninnindale

Soundtrack album by Mani Sharma
- Released: 31 December 2013
- Length: 29:20
- Label: Anand Audio
- Producer: Vijay Kiragandur
External audio
- Official Audio Jukebox on YouTube

The music is composed by Mani Sharma. The audio was launched on 31 December 2013 in presence of his brother Shivrajkumar. Initially it was learnt that Mahesh Babu is going to launching the audio of Ninnindale. Later he didn't attend the function for unknown reasons. But Mahesh Babu wished the Ninnindale team and spoke about his relation with Rajkumar's family through. The film marks the debut of Telugu director Jayanth C. Paranjee into Kannada. Producer Vijay Kumar is happy with the first rush of the film and wants the audio release to make a grand statement.

Track listing
No.	Title	Lyrics	Singer(s)	Length
1.	"Bolo Bham Bham"	V. Nagendra Prasad	Karthik, Sravana Bhargavi	5:06
2.	"Don't Care"	Kaviraj	Vishal Dadlani	4:40
3.	"Haaru Haaru"	Kaviraj	Sweekar, Chaitra H. G.	4:10
4.	"Mouna Thalithe"	Jayanth Kaikini	Arijit Singh	5:10
5.	"Ninthe Ninthe"	Kaviraj	Vijay Prakash, Chinmayi, Sudhamayi	4:55
6.	"Neenu Iruvaga"	K. Kalyan	Karthik, Anuradha Bhat	4:44

== Reception ==
=== Critical response ===
Shyam Prasad S of Bangalore Mirror scored the film at 2.5 out of 5 stars and says "The audience will also miss Harikrishna and Arjun Janya. Except for the lead actors, the rest of them are wasted. Sadhu Kokila does not evoke a single laughter while Brahmanandam’s debut in Kannada is forgettable. If it was not for the presence of Puneeth and his huge fan base, Ninnindale would’ve been a disaster." Shyam Prasad S of The Times of India scored the film at 3 out of 5 stars and says "Puneeth Rajkumar’s fans may not want to miss him in an adventurous avatar. Erica Fernandes is impressive as the girl next door. But PG Vinda’s outstanding cinematography is the high point of the film. Mani Sharma’s music will leave you humming." Sify wrote "Camera work by P.G.Vindha is brilliant and shows the beauty of New York in a very standard mode. Sky diving and breathtaking aerial stunts form the highlight of the movie. The expected movie has lived up to its expectations and has been welcomed grandly by the audience."
