= U Turn (2018 film) =

- Theatrical release poster
- Directed by: Pawan Kumar
- Written by: Pawan Kumar
- Dialogues by: Kavin Bala (Tamil); Bheem (Telugu)
- Based on: U Turn (Kannada)
- Produced by: Srinivasa Chitturi; Rambabu Bandaru
- Starring: Samantha; Aadhi Pinisetty; Rahul Ravindran; Bhumika Chawla
- Cinematography: Niketh Bommireddy
- Edited by: Suresh Arumugam
- Music by: Score: Poornachandra Tejaswi; Songs: Anirudh Ravichander
- Production companies: BR8 Creations; V. Y. Combines; Srinivasaa Silver Screen
- Release date: 13 September 2018
- Running time: 128 minutes
- Country: India
- Languages: Tamil; Telugu

U Turn is a 2018 Indian supernatural thriller film written and directed by Pawan Kumar. The film stars Samantha, Aadhi Pinisetty, Bhumika Chawla, and Rahul Ravindran. Filmed simultaneously in Tamil and Telugu languages, U-Turn is a remake of the director's 2016 Kannada film of the same name. Its plot revolves around the death of motorists who break a traffic rule at a particular flyover and subsequent pinning down of the culprit by an intern journalist and police inspector duo.

Principal photography commenced in February 2018 and ended in June. U-Turn is a songless film, featuring background score composed by Poornachandra Tejaswi and a promotional song composed by Anirudh Ravichander. The cinematography was handled by Niketh Bommireddy and editing by Suresh Arumugam. The films were released on 13 September 2018.

== Plot ==
Rachana, an intern with The Times of India, is working on an article about incidents occurring on a flyover. She has a crush on crime reporter Aditya and seeks his help to gather information on the accidents. Rachana discovers that each day, some motorists move concrete blocks partitioning the road to make a quick U-turn, causing them to be left haphazardly on the road, leading to numerous accidents. A homeless man on the flyover records the vehicle numbers of those violating this rule and gives the list to Rachana. She uses her contacts in the traffic department to obtain the culprits' details, intending to confront them and write an article. However, her attempt to meet the first person on the list fails.

Later that day, Rachana is arrested and accused of killing the person she intended to meet. She explains her side of the story, but the senior police officer dismisses it. Sub-inspector Pradeep Nayak, however, finds her story plausible and investigates further. It is revealed that everyone on Rachana's list has committed suicide on the same day they took the illegal U-turn. Rachana and Nayak discover another number noted by the homeless man, which is to be given to Rachana the next day. They trace the address and attempt to rescue the man, a lawyer, who took the U-turn that day. Finding nothing suspicious, they leave, only to witness the lawyer's suicide as he jumps off his balcony and lands on their car.

Rachana tries to confront the homeless man about the injuries on the flyover. She also reports two young men violating the U-turn to Nayak, who initially dismisses the idea that they would die. To protect them, Nayak locks them in an old police lock-up and monitors them via CCTV. One of the men, seemingly possessed, fights the other, leading to his death, and then shoots himself. Meanwhile, Senior Inspector Chandrashekhar suspends Nayak due to the deaths in police custody. Aditya provides Rachana with an article about the incidents on the flyover.

Rachana interviews Ritesh, who recounts the tragic deaths of his wife Maya and daughter Arna in an accident on the flyover caused by the moved concrete blocks. He urges Rachana to find the person responsible for their deaths.

Desperate to uncover the truth, Rachana takes the illegal U-turn herself and waits for something to happen. She dreams of Maya and Arna, who accuse her of being responsible for their deaths. Maya, using supernatural powers, tries to kill Rachana, who promises to find the real culprit. Awakening, Rachana goes to Nayak's home, where she finds photos of the deceased U-turn violators. With Nayak's help, she identifies the person who moved the blocks on the day of Maya's accident.

Rachana writes the culprit's phone number and address on a balloon and leaves it on the flyover for Maya to find. She discovers that the phone number belongs to Aditya's brother, who had moved to the US, leaving Aditya using his bike. Rachana confronts Aditya, accusing him of causing the deaths. Aditya explains that he had exchanged bikes with a friend, absolving him of direct responsibility.

In a final twist, it is revealed that Ritesh was the one who moved the block, causing the accident. Maya's ghost is waiting in Aditya's house to kill him when Ritesh arrives, having been informed by Rachana. They save Aditya, and Ritesh confesses to Maya and Arna's ghosts that their deaths were his fault. He attempts to commit suicide, but Maya's ghost intervenes, telling him his punishment is to live in this world without them.

== Cast ==
- Samantha as Rachana
- Bhumika Chawla as Maya
- Aadhi Pinisetty as SI Pradeep Nayak
- Rahul Ravindran as Aditya
- Narain as Ritesh
- Aadukalam Naren as Senior Inspector Chandrasekar
- Ravi Prakash as ASI Prabhakar
- Hari Teja as Akila
- Birla Bose as Sundar
- Nagabhushana as an auto driver
- Chatrapathi Sekhar as Sharath Kumar
- Rajashree as Rachana's mother
- Pawan Kumar as media reporter (cameo appearance)

== Production ==
U Turn is a remake of the 2016 Kannada film of the same name. It was filmed simultaneously in Telugu and Tamil languages, to bank on the popularity of lead actress Samantha in the Telugu and Tamil film industries. Pawan Kumar, who directed the original, returned to direct the bilingual remake, marking his debut in both languages. He also made the last 30 minutes different from the Kannada original. The remake was produced by Srinivasa Chitturi and Rambabu Bandaru under the banners BR8 Creations, V. Y. Combines and Srinivasa Silver Screen. Cinematography was handled by Niketh Bommireddy, and editing by Suresh Arumugam. Filming began in February 2018 at Rajahmundry, and ended in June.

== Soundtrack ==
U Turn is a songless film. The background score is composed by Poornachandra Tejaswi, and a promotional song was composed by Anirudh Ravichander, which does not appear in the film itself. The song "The Karma Theme" which was sung by Anirudh with Alisha Thomas on backing vocals, was released on 5 September 2018, and a music video was released on the same day. Directed by Krishna Marimuthu, with cinematography handled by Niketh Bommireddy, the video features Samantha and Anirudh dancing. The song was released in both Telugu and Tamil languages.

Track listing
No.	Title	Lyrics	Singer(s)	Length
1.	"The Karma Theme"	Sri Sai Kiran (Telugu); Subu (Tamil)	Anirudh Ravichander	3:34

== Release and reception ==
U Turn was released on 13 September 2018, during Ganesh Chaturthi. Thinkal Menon of The Times of India rated the Tamil version 3 out of 5, writing "An interesting remake with enough twists and turns, and a climax that could have been more convincing." Suhas Yellapantula of the same newspaper gave the Telugu version the same rating but said that despite the director paying attention to detail, "the pace of the film suffers. What starts of as an engaging film turns into a predictable, stretched out fare".
