= Hombale Films =

Indian film studio

- Type: Privately held company
- Industry: Entertainment
- Founded: 2012; 14 years ago
- Founder: Vijay Kiragandur
- Headquarters: Bengaluru, Karnataka, India
- Key people: Vijay Kiragandur; Chaluve Gowda
- Products: Films
- Divisions: Production; Distribution; Music; Digital marketing
- Website: hombalefilms.com

Hombale Films is an Indian film production and film distribution company based in Bengaluru, India. Founded in the year 2012, the company producing films across multiple languages, with a special focus on Kannada cinema. It is a production house in the Telugu film industry. Over the years, the company has expanded its reach into other Indian languages, including Tamil, Telugu and Malayalam.

== History ==
Hombale Films was founded in 2012 by Vijay Kiragandur and Chaluve Gowda, both from Bengaluru. Hombale Film's first production was the Kannada film Ninnindale in 2014, starring Puneeth Rajkumar. Their next film was Masterpiece, followed by a collaboration with Puneeth Rajkumar, Raajakumara in 2017, which became the top grossing Kannada film at the time. It reportedly grossed more than ₹75 crore (US$8.0 million) in the Karnataka box office.

Hombale Films' fourth film was K.G.F: Chapter 1 directed by Prashanth Neel and released in five languages across India: Kannada, Telugu, Tamil, Malayalam, and Hindi. K.G.F: Chapter 1 was the first Kannada film to gross ₹200 crore (US$21 million) worldwide, earning more than ₹250 crore (US$27 million). As of 2019 it was the third-highest grossing film of Kannada cinema.

Hombale Films' next film was Yuvarathnaa in 2021, which was their third collaboration with Puneeth Rajkumar, and second collaboration with director Santhosh Ananddram. It was released on 1 April 2021 in Kannada and Telugu, and on Amazon Prime Video shortly after due to the COVID-19 pandemic. Yuvarathnaa was Hombale Films first effort in music production, under the label Hombale Music.

Their next film was the sequel to K.G.F: Chapter 1, K.G.F: Chapter 2. It was released on 14 April 2022 and grossed more than ₹1,200 crore (US$130 million). It became the highest-grossing film of Kannada cinema.

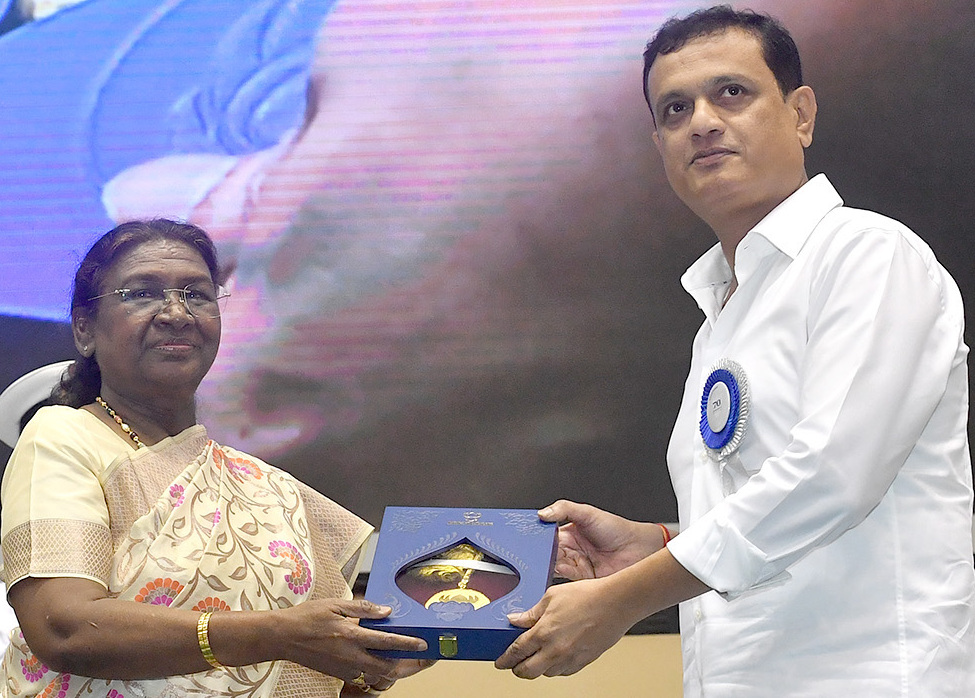
President Murmu gives Kiragandur the National Film Award in 2024

Their next film was Kantara, was written, directed, and acted by Rishab Shetty. It was released on 30 September 2022 to positive reviews. Made for ₹16 crore (US$1.7 million), it grossed more than ₹400 crore (US$43 million) worldwide. It became the second-highest grossing film of Kannada cinema, and sold more tickets than any other Kannada film, beating K.G.F: Chapter 2.

== Filmography ==
Key
†	Denotes films that have not yet been released

=== Production ===
List of Hombale Films productions
Year	Film	Director	Language
2014	Ninnindale	Jayanth C. Paranjee	Kannada
2015	Masterpiece	Manju Mandavya	Kannada
2017	Raajakumara	Santhosh Ananddram	Kannada
2018	K.G.F: Chapter 1	Prashanth Neel	Kannada
2021	Yuvarathnaa	Santhosh Ananddram	Kannada
2022	K.G.F: Chapter 2	Prashanth Neel	Kannada
2022	Kantara	Rishab Shetty	Kannada
2023	Raghavendra Stores	Santhosh Ananddram	Kannada
2023	Dhoomam	Pawan Kumar	Malayalam
2023	Salaar: Part 1 – Ceasefire	Prashanth Neel	Telugu
2024	Raghu Thatha	Suman Kumar	Tamil
2024	Yuva	Santhosh Ananddram	Kannada
2024	Bagheera	Dr. Suri	Kannada
2025	Kantara: Chapter 1	Rishab Shetty	Kannada

=== Distribution ===
List of films distributed by Hombale Films
Year	Film	Director	Language	Notes
2024	The Goat Life	Blessy	Malayalam	
2024	Romeo	Vinayak Vaithianathan	Tamil	
2024	Boat	Chimbu Deven	Tamil	
2024	Prasanna Vadanam	Arjun Y. K	Telugu	
2024	Utsavam	Arjun Sai	Telugu	
2024	Aho Vikramaarka	Peta Trikoti	Telugu	
2024	ARM	Jithin Laal	Malayalam	
2024	Pani	Joju George	Malayalam	
2025	L2: Empuraan	Prithviraj Sukumaran	Malayalam	
2025	Veera Chandrahasa	Ravi Basrur	Kannada	
2025	Mahavatar Narsimha	Ashwin Kumar	Hindi; Kannada; Tamil; Telugu	Also presenter
2025	Mirai	Karthik Gattamneni	Telugu	
2025	Anaconda	Tom Gormican	English	
2026	The RajaSaab	Maruthi	Telugu	
2026	Hanuman Ansh	Vishal Chaturvedi	Hindi	International only
2026	Gondhal	Santosh Davakhar	Marathi	International only
2026	Bohurupi: The Golden Daku	Nandita Roy; Shiboprosad Mukherjee	Bengali	International only
