= Lucia (film) =

- Theatrical release poster
- Directed by: Pawan Kumar
- Written by: Pawan Kumar
- Produced by: Audience films Home Talkies
- Starring: Sathish Ninasam; Sruthi Hariharan; Achyuth Kumar
- Cinematography: Siddhartha Nuni
- Edited by: Sanath–Suresh; Pawan Kumar
- Music by: Poornachandra Tejaswi
- Production company: Audience films
- Distributed by: Home Talkies
- Release dates: 20 July 2013 (London Film Festival); 6 September 2013 (India)
- Country: India
- Language: Kannada
- Budget: ₹50 lakh (US$52,000)
- Box office: ₹3.06 crore (US$320,000)

Lucia is a 2013 Indian Kannada-language psychological thriller drama film written, co-edited and directed by Pawan Kumar. It stars Sathish Ninasam in a double role as Nikki and Nikhil.

The plot revolves around Nikki, an usher in theatre who has insomnia. After consuming a special pill, he gets entangled in a different kind of a dream.

Lucia was the first Kannada film to be crowdfunded by the people. The soundtrack was composed by Poornachandra Tejaswi and cinematography was handled by Siddhartha Nuni. It was premiered at the London Indian Film Festival on 20 July 2013. It won the Best Film Audience Choice award at the festival. It was also among the films shortlisted by the FFI to become India's submission for Academy Award for Best Foreign Language Film for the year 2013.

The film was remade in Tamil as Enakkul Oruvan in 2015. The movie was credited for inspiring a new wave in the Kannada film industry.

== Plot ==
The film follows two versions of the same man: Nikki in reality and Nikhil in dreams. It opens with the protagonist (Sathish Ninasam) in a coma, kept alive on life support. The narrative alternates between two parallel stories — one in colour and the other in black and white. Detective Sanjay of the Mumbai Crime Branch investigates the incident that led to the protagonist’s condition. While examining his belongings, he discovers cryptic notes and a mysterious pill. At the same time, police interrogate two suspects connected to the case.

In reality, Nikki works as an usher, or “torch-shiner”, at a Bengaluru cinema owned by Shankranna (Achyuth Kumar). Suffering from insomnia and loneliness, Nikki obtains Lucia pills from a drug dealer. The pills allow users to dream of the life they desire, but stopping them turns those dreams into nightmares.

After taking the pills, Nikki dreams of being Nikhil, a successful film actor surrounded by dream-world versions of people from his real life. Nikhil’s story is shown in black and white. Nikki falls in love with Shwetha (Sruthi Hariharan), who appears as a waitress in reality and a model in the dream world.

In reality, Shankranna is threatened by gangsters demanding ownership of his theatre over an old debt. Nikki struggles to win Shwetha’s affection; she initially rejects him because of his low income but later falls for his sincerity. Her efforts to improve his life fail, and Shankranna is eventually killed by the gangsters. Refusing to abandon the theatre, Nikki restores it and releases Shankranna’s long-forgotten film. He later reconciles with Shwetha, who agrees to marry him.

In the dream world, Nikhil’s relationship with Shwetha deteriorates because of her work in the film industry. After rescuing Shankranna from kidnappers, Nikhil dismisses him for his own safety, isolates himself, and begins losing his grip on reality. In a trashed room, he shines a torch on the walls and sees scenes from Nikki’s life projected around him.

As events unfold, Shwetha becomes overwhelmed by fame and finally understands Nikhil’s unhappiness. Nikhil admits he can no longer distinguish dreams from reality, but says he is content regardless. He then jumps from a rooftop, shocking everyone present, including a contract killer waiting to murder him.

Meanwhile, Sanjay traces the drug dealer and learns more about the Lucia pills. Shwetha is arrested after attempting to disconnect Nikhil’s life support. During questioning, the investigators watch an old interview in which Nikhil reveals he is colour-blind due to a childhood accident and dreams of living as an ordinary “torch-shiner” in love with a simple woman. It is also revealed that both Nikki and Nikhil suffered from insomnia and took the Lucia pills.

Sanjay concludes that Nikhil chose to remain in his dream world by attempting suicide. To awaken him, Sanjay recreates the dream’s final moments and pretends to shoot the comatose Nikhil with an empty gun. Simultaneously, dream-world Nikhil is shot in the head as his surroundings disappear. The protagonist awakens from the coma, revealing that Nikhil is the real person, while Nikki was part of his lucid dream.

In the ending scene, Nikhil, Shwetha, and Shankranna — alive in reality — happily run an old cinema together, fulfilling Nikhil’s dream of living an ordinary life.

== Cast ==
- Sathish Ninasam in a double role as
  - Nikki
  - Nikhil
- Sruthi Hariharan as Shwetha
- Achyuth Kumar as Shankranna
- Balaji Manohar as a drug dealer
- Hardika Shetty as Kamini
- Bharath
- Satish Kumar
- Sanjay as Sanjay (Mumbai police)
- Rishab Shetty as a police inspector
- Krishna as Deepak (Crime branch officer)
- Aaryan Achukatla as Aryan (second lead/model)
- Poornachandra Mysore as a drug peddler
- Ram Manjjonaath as a lawyer
- Prashanth Siddi as a suspect
- Pia
- Gaurish Akki

== Production ==
In December 2011 Pawan Kumar announced on the Web that his next project, after the success of his directorial debut film Lifeu Ishtene, was going to be Lucia. For the next two months, he met quite a few producers and top actors and found it difficult to fund his film. That led Pawan Kumar to write a post titled Making Enemies on his blog. Three days after it was published, the response was so overwhelming that he decided to pitch the idea of inviting people to produce the film and Pawan Kumar initiated Project Lucia. Aditya Vikram Thoomati was crucial in making the bandwagon work. Fellow writer to Pawan, a newbie to Kannada cinema, Sai Prasad did his writing expertise through it. Lucia is notable for its use of crowdfunding. It was funded by 110 investors who contributed to the project through a Facebook page and a blog run by director-actor Pawan Kumar. It was the first Kannada movie to bypass the traditional film financing model. The director initially offered the lead role to model turned actor Diganth but he was later replaced by Sathish Ninasam, who has played supporting roles in many Kannada films. Lucia was made at a budget of ₹50 lakh (US$52,000). Kannada language television channel Udaya TV bought the satellite rights of the film for ₹0.95 crore (US$99,000). Actor Sathish Ninasam along with the music director Poornachandra Tejaswi visited colleges in Davangere to promote Lucia.

== Soundtrack ==
Lucia
- Soundtrack cover

Soundtrack album by Poornachandra Tejaswi
- Released: 10 June 2013
- Recorded: 2012–13
- Genre: Feature film soundtrack
- Length: 27:40
- Label: Anand Audio
- Producer: Valerie

The music for the film and soundtracks were composed by debutant Poornachandra Tejaswi, and background score composed by Poornachandra Tejaswi. The lyrics were penned by Poornachandra Tejaswi, Yogaraj Bhat and Raghu Shastri. The album has seven tracks.

Track listing
No.	Title	Lyrics	Music	Singer(s)	Length
1.	"Thinbedakami 1"	Poornachandra Tejaswi	Poornachandra Tejaswi	Poornachandra Tejaswi, Arun M. C., Bappi Blossom	3:55
2.	"Nee Thoreda Galigeyali"	Raghu Shastri	Poornachandra Tejaswi	Udith Haritas, Ananya Bhat	4:19
3.	"Jamma Jamma"	Poornachandra Tejaswi	Poornachandra Tejaswi	Naveen Sajju	4:13
4.	"Yako Barlilla"	Poornachandra Tejaswi	Poornachandra Tejaswi	Naveen Sajju	4:13
5.	"Helu Shiva"	Yogaraj Bhat	Poornachandra Tejaswi	Naveen Sajju, Yogaraj Bhat, Rakshith Nagarle	4:01
6.	"Jamma Jamma Patho"	Poornachandra Tejaswi	Poornachandra Tejaswi	Naveen Sajju	3:03
7.	"Thinbedakami 2"	Poornachandra Tejaswi	Poornachandra Tejaswi	Sangeetha Rajeev, Nithin Acharya, Sparsha R. K.	3:56
Total length:					27:40

== Release ==
The trailer of Lucia was released in February 2013, with the film releasing on 6 September 2013. PVR released the film on 6 September 2013 under their "Director’s Rare" category all over India. It was released across Bangalore, Chennai, Kochi, Hyderabad, Mumbai, Pune, Ahmedabad, Surat, and Delhi with English subtitles. Lucia was also set to be released in Pakistan.

== Critical reception ==
Professional ratings
Review scores
Source	Rating
Times of India	3/5 stars
Wogma	3.5/5 stars
Deccan Herald	3.5/5 stars

The critics praised the film. Anurag Kashyap tweeted "My birthday gift to myself would be lucia...". Actor Siddharth was "blown away" after watching the movie. He immediately called the director Pawan Kumar and praised him. Lucia was also in the race for India's official entry to the Oscars.

The movie received positive reviews from critics. Well-known critic Baradwaj Rangan remarked, "An entertaining new Kannada film pushes the envelope even as it pays homage to the old way of doing things". Bookmyshow website said it is a landmark film for Indian cinema. Tribune praised the film story. Baradwaj Rangan writing for The Hindu stated that Lucia is a new type of Kannada film calling it "An entertaining new Kannada film pushes the envelope even as it pays homage to the old way of doing things".

== Box office ==
Lucia earned ₹0.95 crore (US$99,000) in satellite rights and ₹3.06 crore (US$320,000) in ticket sales through its entire run in cinemas, far surpassing its production budget of around ₹0.50 crore (US$52,000). Lucia was also released by PVR Pictures in some cinemas outside Karnataka, fetching around ₹8 lakh (US$8,300) from 13 screens in the first three days.

== Influences and cultural references ==
Director Pawan Kumar admitted to have taken influence from Christopher Nolan and David Lynch. The dream and real sequences being shot in monochrome and in color to differentiate between the two stories, like the Memento and Open Your Eyes to alternate between two plot-lines. The movie's relation with dream and reality and the interrelation between the two. There is also a scene where Nolan's movie Following is seen playing on a TV screen. Requiem for a Dream is also seen playing on a TV in the same scene which is also an influence as the movie deals with addiction. Apart from the cinematic influences, the theme of dream and illusion is also shown as an influence of the poem Nee Mayeyolago by Kanaka Dasa which is quoted at the beginning of the movie. The poem is also partially contained in the lyrics of the song Nee Toreda Galigeyali in the soundtrack.

== Awards ==
Karnataka State Film Awards 2013

- Best Music Director — Poornachandra Tejaswi
- Best Male Playback Singer — Naveen Sajju

61st Filmfare Awards South

- Best Director — Pawan Kumar
- Best Supporting Actor — Achyuth Kumar
- Best Male Playback Singer — Poornachandra Tejaswi – "Thinbedakammi"

London Indian Film Festival 2013

- Audience Choice Award

Karnataka International Music Awards

- Best Background Score — Poornachandra Tejaswi, Monish Kumar M. K., Santhosh Narayanan

3rd South Indian International Movie Awards

- Best Cinematographer — Siddhartha Nuni (Nominated)
- Best Director - Pawan Kumar

== Home media ==
The film was released in Blu-ray, HD DVD, DVD 5.1, VCD Version From Anand Video Studio. It is the first Kannada film to be released in Blu-ray. The director, an advocate of alternative distribution strategies for indie filmmakers, said, "It’s time to set up your own virtual movie theaters on the World Wide Web which will be open 24×7 across the globe."

== See also ==
- Open Your Eyes (1997 film)
