= Poornachandra Tejaswi (composer) =

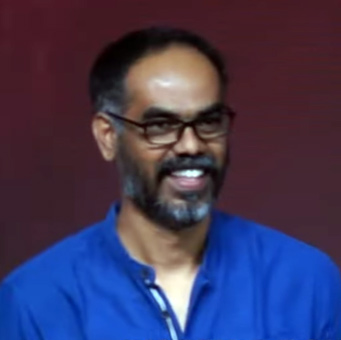
- Poornachandra Tejaswi during the trailer launch of film in March 2024

Background information
- Born: 6 October 1982 (age 43); Karnataka, India
- Genres: Film score; soundtrack; theatre; world
- Occupations: Film composer, Instrumentalist, Playback Singer, Lyricist
- Years active: 2013–present

Poornachandra Tejaswi is an Indian film composer, lyricist and playback singer who primarily works in Kannada Film Industry. His film debut was made in Pawan Kumar's directed Lucia, where he wrote the film's background score, lyrics and songs.

== Personal life ==
Poornachandra Tejaswi was born (6 October, 1982) into a family where both parents were teachers. He hails from the historical town of Srirangapatna in Mandya District, Karnataka. Tejaswi completed his bachelor's degree in Engineering from NIE College, Mysore and worked as a software engineer in Mysore for a few years. He belongs to a group of artists in the Kannada Film Industry who have a theatre background. He was part of the Rock band Stone Age and is an active member of the theatre group The Niranthara foundation.

== Film career ==
Tejaswi began his film career through the critically acclaimed film Lucia (2013). He received a series of nominations and awards including prestigious Karnataka State Award (2014) following soon after.

== Discography ==
Key
†	Denotes films that have not yet been released

Year	Title	Language	Notes
2013	Lucia	Kannada	
2014	Chaturbhuja	Kannada	
2014	Walking With Wolves	English	International Wild Life Film
2015	Vascodigama	Kannada	
2015	Rocket	Kannada	
2016	Bhujanga	Kannada	
2016	Prema Geema Jane Do	Kannada	
2018	U Turn	Tamil, Telugu	
2018	Hebbet Ramakka	Kannada	
2019	Chambal	Kannada	
2019	Fortuner	Kannada	
2019	Hikora	Kannada	
2019	Babru	Kannada	
2021	Kudi Yedamaithe	Telugu	Telugu web series
2023	Dhoomam	Malayalam	Hombale Films; Malayalam debut
2024	Matinee	Kannada	
2026	The Rise of Ashoka	Kannada	
2026	Graamaayana	Kannada	

== Awards ==
- Karnataka State Award 2014 - For Best music director for Lucia
- Filmfare Award (2014) - Best Male Playback Singer for Lucia
- Mirchi award (2014) - Upcoming Music Composer for Lucia
- Big FM Award (2014) - Best Debut song for Lucia
- Raghavendra Chitravani award (2014) - Best Music Director for Lucia
- Santhosham Cine Award Hyderabad (2014) - Best Music Director for Lucia
- Santhosham Cine Award Hyderabad (2014) - Best Playback Singer for Lucia
- KIMA Award (2014) - Best Background score for Lucia

=== Nominations ===
- SIIMA award (2014) - Best Music Director category
- SIIMA award (2014) - Best Lyricist category
