= Kudi Yedamaithe =

Indian sci-fi web series

- Release poster
- Genre: Science fiction Thriller
- Created by: Ram Vignesh
- Written by: Ram Vignesh; Pawan Kumar
- Directed by: Pawan Kumar
- Starring: Amala Paul; Rahul Vijay
- Composer: Poornachandra Tejaswi
- Country of origin: India
- Original language: Telugu
- No. of seasons: 1
- No. of episodes: 8

Production
- Executive producer: Vijaya Rajesh
- Producers: T. G. Vishwa Prasad; Pawan Kumar; Vivek Kuchibotla
- Cinematography: Advaitha Gurumurthy
- Editor: Suresh Arumugam
- Running time: 35–45 minutes
- Production companies: People Media Factory; Pawan Kumar Studios

Original release
- Network: Aha
- Release: 16 July 2021

Kudi Yedamaithe (transl. If right becomes left) is a 2021 Indian Telugu-language science fiction thriller web series created by Ram Vignesh and directed by Pawan Kumar. It is produced by People Media Factory for Aha. The eight-episode series features Amala Paul and Rahul Vijay in lead roles. The title is inspired by song of the same name from the 1953 film Devadasu. It premiered on Aha on 16 July 2021.

== Synopsis ==
Durga (Amala Paul), a police officer, and Adhi (Rahul Vijay), a delivery boy, find themselves in a time loop and relive a day's incidents. When they try to break the cycle they end up with new problems. Their attempts to get out of the time loop form the crux of the story.

== Cast ==
- Amala Paul as CI Durga Goud
- Rahul Vijay as Aditya "Adi"
- Ravi Prakash as Mahendra
- Surya Sreenivas as SI Thilak Surya
- Pradeep Rudra as Arjun
- Pawan Kumar as Harsha
- Nithya Shri as Parvathy
- Raj Madiraju
- Ram Sandeep Varma as Assistant director Abhinav
- Naveen Itika as Yadagiri
- Meghalekha as Meera
- Karthik Sabareesh as Short film director
- Meesam Suresh as Lakshman
- Eshwar Rachiraju as James

== Production ==
In an interview to The Hindu, director Pawan Kumar told that he was approached by Aha through B. V. Nandini Reddy and said "I liked the story and how certain events repeat themselves on a time loop."

== Episodes ==
Episode	Title	Directed by	Written by	Date of Broadcast
1	"Him & Her"	Pawan Kumar	Ram Vignesh	July 16, 2021
2	"Her & Him"	Pawan Kumar	Ram Vignesh	July 16, 2021
3	"Parvathy's Blind Date"	Pawan Kumar	Ram Vignesh	July 16, 2021
4	"Die to Restart"	Pawan Kumar	Ram Vignesh	July 16, 2021
5	"The Face – Off"	Pawan Kumar	Ram Vignesh	July 16, 2021
6	"Second Chance"	Pawan Kumar	Ram Vignesh	July 16, 2021
7	"Save Parvathy?"	Pawan Kumar	Ram Vignesh	July 16, 2021
8	"Is this the End?"	Pawan Kumar	Ram Vignesh	July 16, 2021

== Reception ==
Siby Jeyya of India Herald wrote that "Just watch this 'Kudi Yedamaithe' if you are a big fan of the thriller genre with unpredictable twists!" Praising the story-line, Janani K of India Today stated that "Kudi Yedaimaithe is a great attempt at simplifying a high-concept sci-fi thriller. It could have been perfect if Pawan Kumar had worked on the pacing and the backstory." The Times of India's Sravan Vanaparthy praised the screenplay and performances done by the lead actors.

In contrast, a critic from Pinkvilla gave a rating of 2.5 out of 5 and added that "The narration doesn't give the audience a thorough grip on the turn of events" and praised the cinematography and music.

== Release ==
Along with the original Telugu version, the series has also been released with dubbed version in Hindi & Marathi language titled as 29 February which is available to watch on Ultra Play & Ultra Jhakaas app respectively.
