= Jeevnane Natka Samy =

2021 Indian Kannada-language film

- Directed by: Raju Bhandari Rajavartha
- Produced by: Lalitha Rajashekar Shirahatti
- Starring: Kiran Raj; Shree Harsha; Anika Ramya; Pavitra Kotian
- Cinematography: Kitty Koushik
- Edited by: Umesh R B
- Music by: Athishay Jain
- Release date: 19 August 2021
- Running time: 126 minutes
- Country: India
- Language: Kannada

Jeevnane Natka Samy is a 2021 Indian Kannada-language drama film. It is directed by Raju Bhandari Rajavartha. Lalitha Rajashekhar Shrihatti is the producer of the film. Kiran Raj, Anika Ramya, Shree Harsha and Pavitra Kotian are in the prominent roles. It runs around 126 minutes. Athishay Jain has composed the music of the film.

== Cast ==
- Kiran Raj as Akash
- Shree Harsha as Santhosh
- Anika Ramya as Sneha
- Pavitra Kotian as Suchitra
- Joker Hanumanthu as Umapati
- Rudrayai Sahukar
- Amrutha S as Rekha

== Reception ==
The film received middling reviews.
