= Pawan Kumar (director) =

Indian director, actor, producer, and screenwriter

- Born: 29 October 1982 (age 43)
- Occupations: Director; producer; screenwriter; actor
- Years active: 2007–present
- Spouse: Sowmya Jaganmurthy (m. 2010)
- Children: 1

Pawan Kumar (born 29 October 1982) is an Indian film director, screenwriter and actor who primarily works in Kannada cinema.

Pawan Kumar is well known for writing the films Manasaare and Pancharangi. His directorial debut Lifeu Ishtene (2011) and the 2013 psychological thriller Lucia became one of the biggest turning points of his career. Being from a theatre background, he wrote scripts for plays on stage before working as an associate director with Yograj Bhat. In 2023, he wrote and directed the Malayalam film Dhoomam, which was released to negative reviews.

== Filmography ==
Key
†	Denotes films that have not yet been released

=== As director ===
==== Films ====
List of Pawan Kumar film directing credits
Year	Title	Credited as			Language	Notes
Year	Title	Director	Writer	Producer	Language	Notes
2009	Manasaare	No	Screenplay	No	Kannada	
2010	Pancharangi	No	Yes	No	Kannada	
2011	Lifeu Ishtene	Yes	Yes	No	Kannada	
2013	Lucia	Yes	Yes	Yes	Kannada	
2016	U Turn	Yes	Yes	Yes	Kannada	
2017	Ondu Motteya Kathe	No	No	Yes	Kannada	
2018	U Turn	Yes	Yes	No	Tamil; Telugu	Bilingual Film. Debut in Tamil and Telugu cinema.
2021	Ikkat	No	No	Yes	Kannada	
2022	Naam Tha Kanhaiyalal	Yes	No	Co-producer	Hindi	
2023	Dhoomam	Yes	Yes	No	Malayalam	Debut in Malayalam cinema.

==== Web series ====
Pawan Kumar web series credits
Year	Title	Credited as			Network	Language
Year	Title	Director	Writer	Producer	Network	Language
2019	Leila	Yes	No	No	Netflix	Hindi
2021	Kudi Yedamaithe	Yes	Yes	Co-producer	Aha	Telugu

=== As actor ===
Pawan Kumar film acting credits
Year	Title	Role	Notes
2007	Mr. Garagasa		
2008	Inthi Ninna Preethiya	Vaasne Baabu	
2009	Manasaare	Dollar	
2009	Circus	Krishnamurthy "Kitty"	
2010	Pancharangi	Lakshman "Lucky" Rao	
2011	Lifeu Ishtene	Suraj	
2015	Plus		
2018	Gultoo	Phaneesh	
2018	Chambal		
2018	U Turn	Media reporter	Telugu–Tamil film
2019	Alidu Ulidavaru		
2021	Kudi Yedamaithe	Harsha	Telugu web series
2022	Honeymoon	New friend in a bar	Web series
2022	Gaalipata 2	Bhushan	
2023	Hostel Hudugaru Bekagiddare	senior	Cameo
2024	Bachelor Party	Lobo Griffin	Cameo
2025	Shodha	Rule-bending lawyer	Web series

== Awards and nominations ==
Awards and nominations received by Pawan Kumar
Year	Work	Award	Category	Result	Ref.
2012	Lifeu Ishtene	59th Filmfare Awards South	Best Director	Nominated	
2012	Lifeu Ishtene	Bangalore Times Film Awards	Best Director	Won	
2014	Lucia	61st Filmfare Awards South	Best Director	Won	
2014	Lucia	London Indian Film Festival 2013	Audience Choice Award	Won	
2014	Lucia	3rd SIIMA Awards	Best Director	Nominated	
2017	U Turn	64th Filmfare Awards South	Best Film	Nominated	
2017	U Turn	64th Filmfare Awards South	Best Director	Nominated	
2017	U Turn	6th SIIMA Awards	Best Film	Nominated	
2017	U Turn	6th SIIMA Awards	Best Director	Nominated	
2017	U Turn	2nd IIFA Utsavam	Best Picture	Nominated	
2017	U Turn	2nd IIFA Utsavam	Best Direction	Won	
2017	U Turn	2nd IIFA Utsavam	Best Story	Won	
2018	Ondu Motteya Kathe	65th Filmfare Awards South	Kannada Best Film	Won	
2018	Ondu Motteya Kathe	7th SIIMA Awards	Best Film	Nominated	
