= 418 (film) =

2026 Indian horror thriller film by Kirtan Nadagouda

- Theatrical release poster
- Directed by: Kirtan Nadagouda
- Written by: Kirtan Nadagouda
- Produced by: Naveen Yerneni; Yalamanchili Ravi Shankar
- Starring: Chaithra J. Achar; Ramesh Indira; Surya Raj Veerabathini; Charan Lakkaraju; Preethi Pagadala
- Cinematography: Dinesh Divakaran
- Edited by: Akul Avinash
- Music by: Venky GG
- Production company: Mythri Movie Makers
- Distributed by: see below
- Release date: 23 October 2026
- Running time: 148 minutes
- Country: India
- Language: Telugu

418 is a 2026 Indian Telugu-language horror thriller film written and directed by Kirtan Nadagouda in his directorial debut. Produced by Mythri Movie Makers, the film stars Chaithra J. Achar, Ramesh Indira, Surya Raj Veerabathini, Charan Lakkaraju, and Preethi Pagadala.

The film marks Mythri Movie Makers' first venture into the horror genre. Following paid premieres on 22 October 2026, the film had a worldwide theatrical release on 23 October 2026.

== Plot ==
Set in a dread-stricken village, the narrative centres on a medical college building (VIMS) that has remained locked and abandoned for fifteen years. When the sealed building is reopened despite strong opposition from local villagers, unexplained and sinister occurrences begin to unfold.

Vivek, an 18-year-old student capable of sensing supernatural anomalies that nobody else perceives, struggles to convince those around him as his warnings are dismissed as hallucinations. As Vivek and his friends investigate the clash between scientific reasoning and local superstition, the arrival of Devika, a woman desperate to become a mother at any cost—shifts the mystery toward Room No. 418, a sealed storeroom inside the hostel building where no woman who enters reportedly survives.

== Cast ==
- Chaithra J. Achar as Devika
- Ramesh Indira as Dr. Subash Patil
- Surya Raj Veerabathini as Vivek Shankar
- Charan Lakkaraju as Rohith
- Preethi Pagadala as Saisha
- Shashank Patil as Doctor
- Shree Vaishnav as Maggie
- Shrikanth Ganesh as Mohan, Devika's husband
- Kota Jayaram as Hostel warden
- Goparaju Vijay as Devika's Guru
- Sammeta Gandhi
- Gopi Gavireddy
- Dharma Teja Duba
- Abhishek Reddy R.
- Bank Baasha
- Satyanarayana Vaddadhi as the watchman
- Recce Naidu
- Rekha Nirosha
- Sanjana Hardageri as Kavya
- Sreevaani Tripuraneni
- Vaani Shalini
- T. S. Rajesh
- Nagarani Reddy
- Hiranmayi Purushotham
- Navaneeth Madishetti

== Production ==
=== Development ===
In November 2025, Mythri Movie Makers announced its maiden horror production, presented by filmmaker Prashanth Neel and written and directed by debutant Kirtan Nadagouda. Nadagouda had worked for over a decade in Neel's direction team as an assistant and co-director, beginning with Ugramm (2014) and continuing through KGF: Chapter 1 (2018), KGF: Chapter 2 (2022), and Salaar: Part 1 – Ceasefire (2023).

The project was formally launched with a pooja ceremony in Hyderabad on 17 November 2025. Naveen Yerneni and Yalamanchili Ravi Shankar produced the film, with Anil Yerneni serving as co-producer. Departing from the horror-comedy template prevalent in Telugu cinema, the makers conceived the project as a serious, atmospheric horror thriller mounted on a controlled budget of ₹6–8 crore.

=== Casting and filming ===
At the time of the film's launch, emerging actors Surya Raj Veerabathini, Charan Lakkaraju, Hanu Reddy, and Preethi Pagadala (noted for Patang) were cast in principal roles. Kannada actress Chaithra J. Achar and actor-director Ramesh Indira headlined the central narrative, joined by Shashank Patil and Shree Vaishnav.

Principal photography was conducted simultaneously in Telugu and Kannada and wrapped prior to July 2026.

== Music ==
The film's original background score and music were composed by Venky GG (credited in full as Venkatesh G. Bhat).

No.	Title	Lyrics	Singer(s)	Length
1.	"Neeli Neeli"	Rakendu Mouli	Venky GG	3:54
2.	"The Lullaby"	Pramod Maravanthe	Chaithra J Achar	3:23

== Release ==
=== Censorship and postponements ===
418 was initially scheduled for a worldwide theatrical release on 31 July 2026. However, the release was deferred after the Central Board of Film Certification (CBFC) raised four objections concerning the intensity of the film's horror and gore sequences. The producers subsequently approached the CBFC Revising Committee, which cleared the film with an 'A' (adults only) certificate on 10 September 2026 with a certified runtime of 148 minutes.

Following censorship clearance, Mythri Movie Makers announced a new release date of 18 September 2026. In 15 September 2026, three days prior to release, the studio postponed the film a second time to organise a simultaneous multi-language theatrical release across India after positive responses from special preview screenings, particularly from Hindi distributors.

=== Theatrical ===
In 2 October 2026, the makers locked 23 October 2026 for the film's worldwide theatrical release in Telugu, Kannada, Tamil, and Hindi, coinciding with the Dasara festive window. Special paid premieres were scheduled for the night of 22 October 2026 exclusively in theatres equipped with Dolby Atmos sound systems.

=== Distrbution ===
Mythri Movie Makers distributed the film in the Telugu states, while VK Films handled theatrical distribution in Karnataka and RFT Films distributed the film in the United Kingdom and Europe. AA Films acquired the Hindi-dubbed version distribution rights.

=== Home media ===
The post-theatrical digital streaming rights of the film were acquired by Netflix, and the film began streaming on the platform from 20 November 2026 in Telugu and dubbed versions of Hindi, Tamil, Kannada and Malayalam languages.
