= Salaar: Part 1 – Ceasefire (soundtrack) =

2023 soundtrack album by Ravi Basrur

- Soundtrack album cover

Soundtrack album by Ravi Basrur
- Released: 31 December 2023
- Recorded: 2022–2023
- Studio: Ravi Basrur Studio
- Genre: Feature film soundtrack
- Length: 20:58
- Language: Telugu
- Labels: Hombale Music; Divo
- Producer: Ravi Basrur

Ravi Basrur chronology
Abhiramachandra (2023)	Salaar: Part 1 – Ceasefire (2023)	Bhimaa (2024)
External audio
- Salaar - Jukebox (Telugu) on YouTube

Singles from Salaar: Part 1 – Ceasefire
- 1. "Sooreede" Released: 13 December 2023; 2. "Prathikadalo" Released: 21 December 2023; 3. "Sound of Salaar" Released: 22 December 2023; 4. "Vinaraa" Released: 26 December 2023

Salaar: Part 1 – Ceasefire is the soundtrack to the 2023 film of the same name directed by Prashanth Neel under the production of Hombale Films, starring Prabhas, Prithviraj Sukumaran and Shruti Haasan. The film features music composed by Ravi Basrur and lyrics written by Krishna Kanth. The soundtrack which consisted of four songs and three instrumental tracks were released by Hombale Music and Divo on 31 December 2023.

== Development ==
Basrur has been frequently collaborated with Neel since their feature debuts with Ugramm (2014) and the KGF franchise. This is also his third film in Telugu, following Marshal (2019) and Sasanasabha (2022). For the film's score, Basrur collaborated with international musicians to record the orchestral music. The brass section has a 60-member ensemble who recorded the drums, brass and other orchestral scores for four days. Besides composing, Basrur had also worked with the sound design with engineers mastering the score in DTS and Dolby Digital formats. Basrur started recording the background score during August and September 2023.

== Release ==
Divo served as the digital distributor for the film's music. The soundtrack was preceded with the first single "Sooreede" on 13 December 2023 sung by Harini Ivaturi. The song picturizes on the friendship between Prabhas and Sukumaran, while media reports falsely clarify the song to be about brotherhood. The second single "Prathikadalo" was released on 21 December. The third single titled "Sound of Salaar" was released on 22 December 2023. The fourth single titled "Vinaraa" was released on 26 December 2023. The song "Aaru Sethulunnaa" was released along with full soundtrack album on 31 December 2023.

== Track listing ==
=== Telugu ===
All lyrics are written by Krishna Kanth.

No.	Title	Singer(s)	Length
1.	"Sooreede"	Harini Ivaturi	3:18
2.	"Prathikadalo"	Chorus	3:07
3.	"Vinaraa"	Sachin Basrur	3:15
4.	"Aaru Sethulunnaa"	Kanakavva	1:37
5.	"Sound of Salaar"	Instrumental	2:55
6.	"Salaar: Part 1 – Ceasefire (Trailer Theme)"	Instrumental	3:49
7.	"Salaar – Final Punch (Theme)"	Instrumental	2:53
Total length:			20:54

Extended Soundtrack
No.	Title	Singer(s)	Length
8.	"World of Khansaar"	Instrumental	1:25
9.	"Wrath of Salaar"	Instrumental	2:25

=== Kannada ===
All lyrics are written by Kinnal Raj.

No.	Title	Singer(s)	Length
1.	"Aakaasha Gadiya"	Vijayalaxmi Mettinahole	3:18
2.	"Prathikatheya"	Chorus	3:07
3.	"Geleya"	Sachin Basrur	3:15
4.	"Aru Katti"	Vasanthi Shenoy	1:37
5.	"Sound of Salaar"	Instrumental	2:55
6.	"Salaar: Part 1 – Ceasefire (Trailer Theme)"	Instrumental	3:49
7.	"Salaar – Final Punch (Theme)"	Instrumental	2:53
Total length:			20:54

=== Tamil ===
All lyrics are written by Madhurakavi.

No.	Title	Singer(s)	Length
1.	"Suriyan Kudaiya Neetti"	Airaa Udupi	3:18
2.	"Pala Kadhaiyil"	Chorus	3:07
3.	"Arivaai"	Santhosh Venky	3:15
4.	"Aaru Kaiyi"	Kidakuzhi Mariyammal	1:37
5.	"Sound of Salaar"	Instrumental	2:55
6.	"Salaar: Part 1 – Ceasefire (Trailer Theme)"	Instrumental	3:49
7.	"Salaar – Final Punch (Theme)"	Instrumental	2:53
Total length:			20:54

=== Malayalam ===
All lyrics are written by Rajeev Govindan.

No.	Title	Singer(s)	Length
1.	"Suryangam"	Indulekha Warrier	3:18
2.	"Prathikaramo"	Chorus	3:07
3.	"Varamaay"	Arjun Vijay	3:15
4.	"Aaru Kaikal"	Kidakuzhi Mariyammal	1:37
5.	"Sound of Salaar"	Instrumental	2:55
6.	"Salaar: Part 1 – Ceasefire (Trailer Theme)"	Instrumental	3:49
7.	"Salaar – Final Punch (Theme)"	Instrumental	2:53
Total length:			20:54

=== Hindi ===
All lyrics are written by Riya Mukherjee.

No.	Title	Singer(s)	Length
1.	"Sooraj Hi Chhaon Banke"	Menuka Poudel	3:18
2.	"Qissonmein"	Chorus	3:07
3.	"Yaraa"	Sri Krishna	3:15
4.	"Kaali Maa"	Shashika Mooruth	1:37
5.	"Sound of Salaar"	Instrumental	2:55
6.	"Salaar: Part 1 – Ceasefire (Trailer Theme)"	Instrumental	3:49
7.	"Salaar – Final Punch (Theme)"	Instrumental	2:53
Total length:			20:54

== Background score ==
Salaar: Part 1 – Ceasefire

Film score by Ravi Basrur
- Released: 2 May 2024
- Recorded: 2022–2023
- Genre: Film score
- Length: 94:27
- Language: Telugu
- Labels: Hombale Music; Divo
- Producer: Ravi Basrur

The background score was arranged and composed by Ravi Basrur.

Salaar Pt.1 - Ceasefire ( Original Background Score)
No.	Title	Length
1.	"Deva Stands For Vardha"	1:26
2.	"Deva vs Bailwaan"	1:35
3.	"Deva Takes Out The Bailwaan"	2:07
4.	"Suriya's Promise To Vardha"	2:43
5.	"Gangs Of Khansar"	4:43
6.	"Kidnapping Aradhya"	1:34
7.	"The Saviour Amma"	0:28
8.	"Deva Intro"	1:26
9.	"Obulamma Is Ready For Revenge"	2:01
10.	"Searching Aradhya"	1:28
11.	"Deva Missing Vardha"	0:47
12.	"Deva's Haunting Past"	0:57
13.	"Deva's Garage"	0:55
14.	"Deva Controls His Anger"	1:05
15.	"Hunt For Aradhya"	0:55
16.	"The Seal"	2:19
17.	"No Once Can Stop That Seal"	0:59
18.	"Dummy Knife"	2:04
19.	"Hunt Goes To Tinsukia"	1:52
20.	"Deva Fights For Aradhya"	1:36
21.	"Aradhya Is Found"	1:11
22.	"Deva Attacks The Consignment"	1:37
23.	"The Consignment Is Stopped"	1:01
24.	"Salaar Devarata Raisaar"	2:55
25.	"Varadha Raja Mannar vs Salaar"	3:38
26.	"The Tribes Of Khansar"	1:10
27.	"Nibandhanai - The Book Of Rules"	0:51
28.	"Shiva Mannar Rule"	1:16
29.	"Eliminating Shouryangas"	1:11
30.	"Rama In Charge Of Khansaar"	1:49
31.	"Ranga Plans To Eliminate Vardha"	2:17
32.	"Chaos In Khansaar"	1:16
33.	"Cease Fire"	1:44
34.	"Assembling Armies"	1:36
35.	"Vardha's One Man Army"	1:02
36.	"Deva - Varadha Reunite"	1:15
37.	"The Girls Prayer"	1:11
38.	"Madman Deva"	0:49
39.	"Vulnerabale Tribe Community"	1:55
40.	"Vishnu Targets Vardha"	1:11
41.	"Baachi Hates Deva"	0:34
42.	"Deva Enters Khansaar"	1:29
43.	"Deva At Khansaar Gate"	0:59
44.	"Fight For Throne"	1:06
45.	"Kaaliaman Fight"	1:37
46.	"Deva Kills Vishnu"	1:53
47.	"Deva Goes On Rage Mode"	0:55
48.	"Deva's Brutality"	0:41
49.	"Mayhem At Mahara"	1:37
50.	"Deva Takes Out Vishnu's Men"	0:39
51.	"Varadha's Fear On Deva's Action"	0:46
52.	"Will Deva Come With Vardha"	0:39
53.	"Kaali Amma's Son"	0:41
54.	"Deva Enters Mahara"	1:27
55.	"Cease Fire Alliance"	1:33
56.	"Narang Is Furious"	0:46
57.	"Narang's Decision"	1:36
58.	"I Kindly Request"	1:20
59.	"Rama Warns Vardha"	2:20
60.	"Cease Fire Lifted"	0:29
61.	"The Tatoo"	2:08
62.	"Climax Battle"	2:14
63.	"Khansaar Civil War"	1:58
64.	"Rise Of Shouryangas"	1:40
65.	"Salaar The Shourayanga"	1:53
Total length:		94:27

== Reception ==
Paul Nicodemus of The Times of India wrote "Ravi Basrur’s soundtrack adds a robust layer to the film's atmosphere, complementing the tone and heightening the emotional impact of certain scenes." Janani K. of India Today and Mayur Sanap of Rediff.com described it as both "thumping" and "edgy". Critic based at 123Telugu wrote "Ravi Basrur delivers a satisfactory job and his score helps in elevating a few scenes". Sowmya Rajendran of The News Minute said that the background score has been executed well. Rahul Devanapalli of The Week wrote "The music integrates with the plot but does not register much".
