= Bhuvan Gowda =

Indian cinematographer

- Born: India
- Occupation: Cinematographer
- Years active: 2014–present

Bhuvan Gowda is an Indian cinematographer who works in Kannada films. His popular works include Ugramm (2014), KGF duology (2018–2022) and Salaar: Part 1 – Ceasefire (2023). Gowda has won the SIIMA Award for Best Cinematographer – Telugu for the latter.

== Career ==
Gowda began his career as a cinematographer for Prashanth Neel's Ugramm after the main cinematographer left the film. He shot the film with a 5D camera. In 2017, he was the cinematographer for Pushpaka Vimana. His work was well appreciated by critics. He collaborated with Neel again for K.G.F: Chapter 1 after Ugramm. Gowda garnered acclaim for his work in KGF: Chapter: 1 and won the SIIMA Award for Best Cinematographer. For K.G.F: Chapter 1, Gowda carried 40 kilogram camera for every shot and also used a drone. His next work was K.G.F: Chapter 2, where he collaborated with Neel for the third time.

== Filmography ==
Key
†	Denotes films that have not yet been released

Year	Title	Language	Notes
2014	Ugramm	Kannada	Debut
2015	Lodde	Kannada	
2015	Rathaavara	Kannada	
2017	Pushpaka Vimana	Kannada	
2018	K.G.F: Chapter 1	Kannada	
2022	K.G.F: Chapter 2	Kannada	
2023	Salaar: Part 1 - Ceasefire	Telugu	Debut in Telugu cinema
2027	Dragon †	Telugu	
