= Salaar: Part 1 – Ceasefire =

2023 Indian film by Prashanth Neel

- Theatrical release poster
- Directed by: Prashanth Neel
- Written by: Prashanth Neel
- Dialogues by: Sandeep Reddy Bandla; Hanumaan Choudary; Dr. Suri
- Produced by: Vijay Kiragandur
- Starring: Prabhas; Prithviraj Sukumaran; Bobby Simha; Shruti Haasan; Jagapathi Babu; Sriya Reddy
- Cinematography: Bhuvan Gowda
- Edited by: Ujwal Kulkarni
- Music by: Ravi Basrur
- Production company: Hombale Films
- Distributed by: see below
- Release date: 22 December 2023
- Running time: 175 minutes
- Country: India
- Language: Telugu
- Budget: ₹270–300 crore
- Box office: ₹612–702 crore (Note: According to Box Office India Salaar: Part 1 – Ceasefire grossed around ₹612 crore worldwide and Hindustan Times reported ₹617 crore while India Today reported that the film grossed around ₹700 crore worldwide during its 2023 run. In July 2024, the film was released in Japan, earning JPY 23 million (USD 142,000; ₹1.19 crore) in its initial days, bringing the adjusted worldwide total to approximately ₹614–702 crore.)

Salaar: Part 1 – Ceasefire (Trans. Commander: Part 1 - Ceasefire) is a 2023 Indian Telugu-language epic neo-noir action film directed by Prashanth Neel and produced by Vijay Kiragandur under Hombale Films. The film stars Prabhas in the titluar role, alongside an ensemble cast of Prithviraj Sukumaran, Shruti Haasan, Jagapathi Babu, Bobby Simha, Sriya Reddy, Ramachandra Raju, Easwari Rao, John Vijay, Devaraj, Tinnu Anand, Pramod Panju, Vajrang Shetty, Brahmaji and Mime Gopi. In the fictional dystopian city-state of Khansaar, where constitutional monarchy still exists, the film follows the friendship between Deva (Prabhas), the exiled prince of Khansaar, and Varadha (Prithviraj), the current prince of Khansaar. When a coup d'état is planned by his father's ministers and his relatives, Varadha enlists Deva's help to become Khansaar's undisputed ruler.

The film's initial storyline was pitched from Neel's 2014 Kannada-language debut film Ugramm and is the maiden part of a two-part film. It was officially announced in December 2020 under the title Salaar, however, in July 2023, its first installment was titled as Salaar: Part 1 – Ceasefire. Principal photography commenced in January 2021, and occurred sporadically in several legs over nearly three years, before wrapping in late 2023. Filming locations included Telangana, Italy and Budapest. Production difficulties, ranging from the pandemic, reshoots and VFX delays, postponed Salaar's release date several times until being announced to be released on 22 December 2023. The music is composed by Ravi Basrur, cinematography handled by Bhuvan Gowda and editing by Ujwal Kulkarni.

Salaar: Part 1 – Ceasefire was theatrically released on 22 December 2023, coinciding with Christmas. The film received positive reviews from critics. It was a commercial success, earning an estimated ₹612–617 crore on a ₹270–300 crore budget making it the highest-grossing Telugu film of 2023, third highest-grossing Telugu film of all time, nineteenth highest-grossing Indian film of all time and the highest grossing A-rated Telugu film of all time at the end of its theatrical run.

== Plot ==
In 1985, Deva and Vardha Raja "Vardha" Mannar are close companions in Khansaar, a powerful city-state ruled by Vardha's father, Raja Mannar. After Raja Mannar orders the extermination of the Shouryaanga tribe, a mob attacks Deva and his mother. Vardha intervenes by surrendering a valuable territory to the mob's leader in exchange for their safety and secretly helps them flee Khansaar. Before leaving, Deva promises to return whenever Vardha calls upon him.

In 2017, Aadhya, the daughter of NRI Krishnakanth, travels from New York City to Varanasi to immerse her mother's ashes. Her arrival attracts the attention of Obulamma, a loyal aide to Vardha's step-sister Radha Rama, who orders her abduction. Krishnakanth seeks help from Bilal, who hides Aadhya at the residence of his friend Deva in Tinsukia, Assam, where she poses as a teacher at a school run by Deva's mother. When armed men locate and attempt to abduct her, Deva, despite his mother's longstanding insistence that he avoid violence, intervenes and defeats them. Later, Deva attacks a convoy bearing the emblem of Khansaar to rescue Aadhya and Bilal, drawing the attention of Vardha, Obulamma, and Radha Rama. Radha Rama reveals that she orchestrated the events to provoke a conflict between Deva and Vardha, as opposing Khansaar's emblem is punishable by death. Bilal subsequently recounts the history of Khansaar and the bond between Deva and Vardha to Aadhya.

In 1127, dacoits from the Mannar, Shouryaanga, and Ghaniyaar tribes established Khansaar. The three tribes jointly protected the territory for centuries, including during British rule. Following Indian independence in 1947, Siva Mannar, Raja Mannar's father, declared Khansaar an autonomous state and erased it from official maps. To maintain order, he divided the territory into 101 provinces governed by Kapus under the supervision of eight Doras, while establishing the Nibandhana, the constitution of Khansaar. After Siva Mannar's death in 1985, Raja Mannar assassinated Dhaara Raisaar, the Shouryaanga heir to the throne, and ordered the massacre of the Shouryaanga tribe to consolidate power.

In 2010, Bhaarava, the husband of Radha Rama, persuades Raja Mannar to reconcile with his exiled sons, Vardha and Baachi. Raja Mannar reinstates Vardha by forcing the Dora Ranga to relinquish his position before leaving Khansaar and appointing Radha Rama as regent. To prevent conflict over succession, Radha Rama proposes a ceasefire, though the Doras insist that the matter be settled through a formal vote under the Nibandhana. An election is scheduled for nine days later, prompting rival factions to recruit mercenaries in anticipation of war once the voting concludes.

Vardha summons Deva, who arrives in Khansaar and remains loyal despite repeated humiliation. Tensions escalate when Vishnu, the son of Dora Naarang, attempts to molest a tribal girl, leading Deva to kill him. Deva, Vardha, and their allies are imprisoned, while Rudra Mannar, Vardha's half-brother, manipulates Naarang into targeting Vardha during the trial. When Naarang refuses to relent, Deva kills him.

On the day of the vote, Raja Mannar returns and supports the ceasefire, but Vardha casts the deciding vote against it. Deva and Vardha escape execution and kill Ranga and his followers. Meanwhile, Raja Mannar reveals to Radha Rama that the Shouryaanga tribe survived the massacre and that Bhaarava is secretly a member of the tribe conspiring against the Mannars. After capturing Bhaarava's associate Thiru, they learn that Deva is the son of Dhaara Raisaar and the rightful heir to Khansaar, while Vardha had sacrificed his territory years earlier to protect Deva's family.

As rival factions unite against the Mannars and Vardha's allies discover Deva's true identity, Vardha publicly declares Deva as his Salaar.

== Cast ==
- Prabhas as Devaratha "Deva" Raisaar alias "Salaar"
  - Videsh Anand as young Devaratha
- Prithviraj Sukumaran in a dual role:
  - Varadha Raja Mannar
    - Karthikeya Dev as young Vardha Raja Mannar
  - Shiva Mannar, Varadha's grandfather
- Jagapathi Babu as Raja Shiva Mannar, Varadha's father and the king of Khansaar
- Bobby Simha as Bhaarava
- Easwari Rao as Deva's mother
- Shruti Haasan as Aaradhya "Aadhya" Krishnakanth
- Sriya Reddy as Radha Rama Mannar, Bhaarava's wife and Varadha's elder sister
- John Vijay as Ranga
- Tinnu Anand as Gaikwad alias "Baba"
- Devaraj as Om
- Brahmaji as Vaali
- Ramachandra Raju as Rudra Raja Mannar, Varadha's elder brother
  - Harsh Roshan as young Rudra Raja Mannar
- M.S Chowdary in a dual role:
  - Naarang, Ranga's brother
  - Naarang, Gurung and Ranga's father (flashback appearance)
- Ramana as Rinda, Varadha's henchman
- Mime Gopi as Bilal, Deva's helper
- Jhansi as Obulamma, Radha Rama's maid
- Pramod Panju as Baachi Raja Mannar, Varadha's younger brother
- Vajrang Shetty as Vishnu, Naarang's son
- Saurav Lokesh as Cheeka
- Cheluvaraj as Gurung, Naarang and Ranga's brother
- Madhu Guruswamy as Hazare, Rudra Raja's henchman
- Ravi Bhat as Krishnakanth, Aadhya's father
- Naveen Shankar as Pandit, Rudra's henchman
- Shafi as Thiru, Bhaarava's henchman
- Prudhvi Raj as Sarpanch
- Saptagiri as Chandram
- Jason Shah as a consignment lord
- Sampath Ram as Vedha, Obulamma's henchman
- Kalpalatha as Surabhi's mother
- Farzana as Surabhi, a local tribe girl living in Khansaar
- Sathvik Varma as Obulamma's grandson

== Production ==
=== Development ===
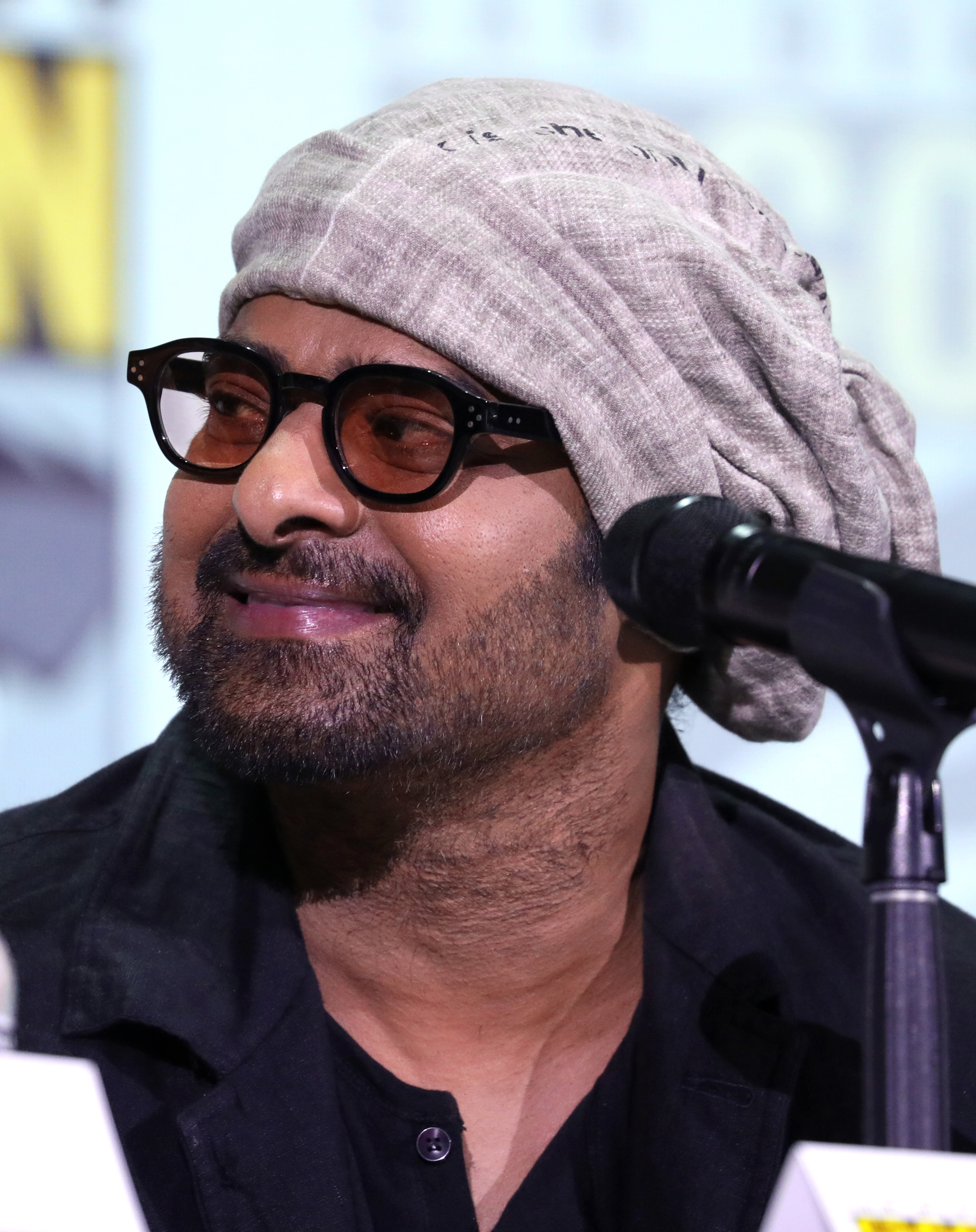
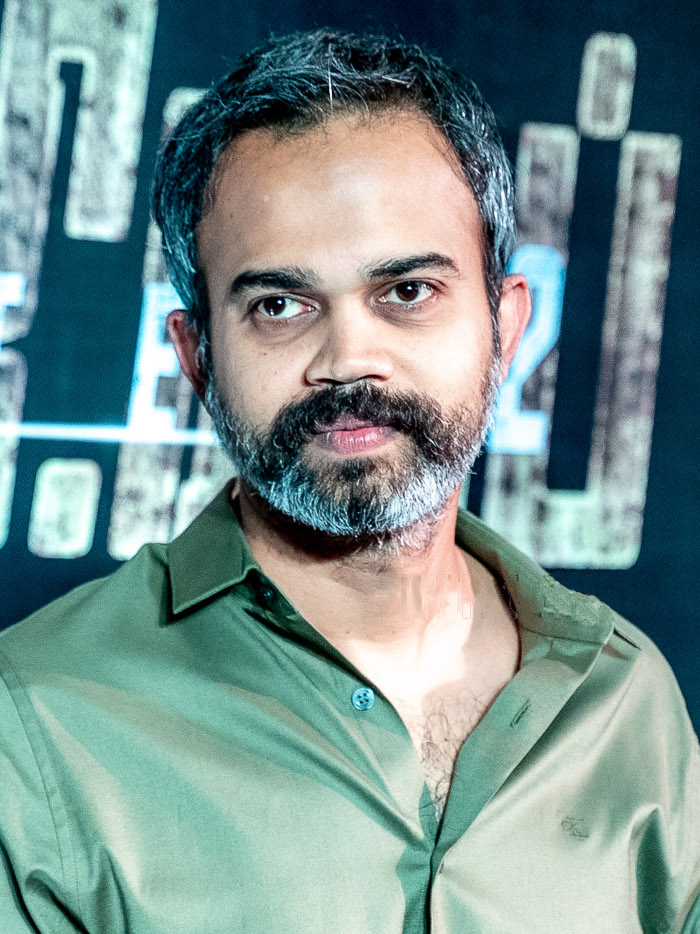
Salaar: Part 1 – Ceasefire is the first collaboration of Prabhas (L) with Prashanth Neel.

In November 2020, Neel was reported to begin production for his next directorial ventures with either N. T. Rama Rao Jr. or Prabhas soon. On 2 December, Hombale Films announced that Neel would collaborate with Prabhas next, on a Telugu-language film (Neel's first) titled Salaar.

A muhurtam pooja ceremony was held on 15 January 2021 with the presence of the film's cast and crew in Hyderabad. Ravi Basrur was roped in to compose the score, in his fourth consecutive film with Neel, while Bhuvan Gowda and Ujwal Kulkarni were approached to handle the cinematography and editing, respectively. Initialed to be a one-part movie, on 8 July 2023, the production house announced that Salaar would be released in two parts, with the first subtitled Ceasefire.

=== Casting ===
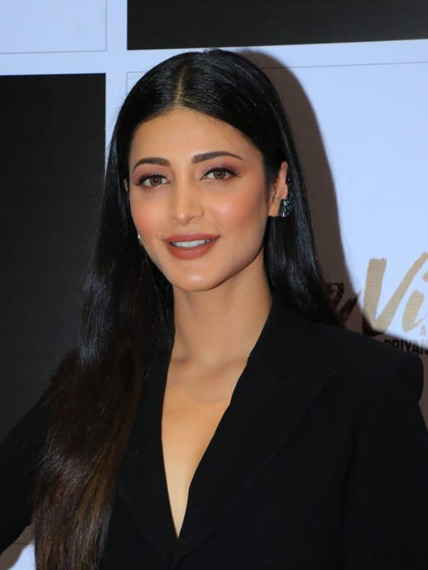
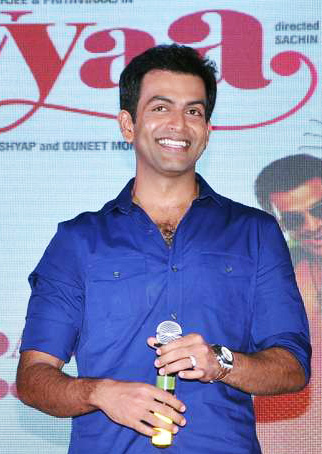
Shruti Haasan (L) was cast to play the lead actress role, pairing opposite Prabhas for the first time. Prithviraj Sukumaran (R) made his return to Telugu cinema after Police Police (2010).

On casting Prabhas, Neel stated "I was drawn to his innocence. Prabhas exudes more innocence compared to most other actors. To draw out this innocence and show it on screen will be fantastic.", while Prabhas stated that his character is "extremely violent", something that he "haven't really done before". The latter was reported to get more fit and muscular for his role. He was further reported to play a dual role, which was later denied.

On 28 January 2021, Prabhas wished Shruti Haasan a happy birthday, and welcomed her to the Salaar team. She played the role of Aadhya and received a remuneration consisting ₹8 crore (US$850,000). Prabhas, during a press meet for Radhe Shyam in Kochi, revealed that Prithviraj Sukumaran would play other lead role alongside Prabhas in the film thus, marking Prithviraj's return to Telugu cinema after Police Police (2010).

Madhu Guruswamy, Jagapathi Babu, Easwari Rao, Sriya Reddy, Tinnu Anand, Bobby Simha, Ramachandra Raju, Saptagiri were cast to play prominent roles. Mime Gopi and John Vijay's presence in the promotional trailer revealed their inclusion.

=== Filming ===
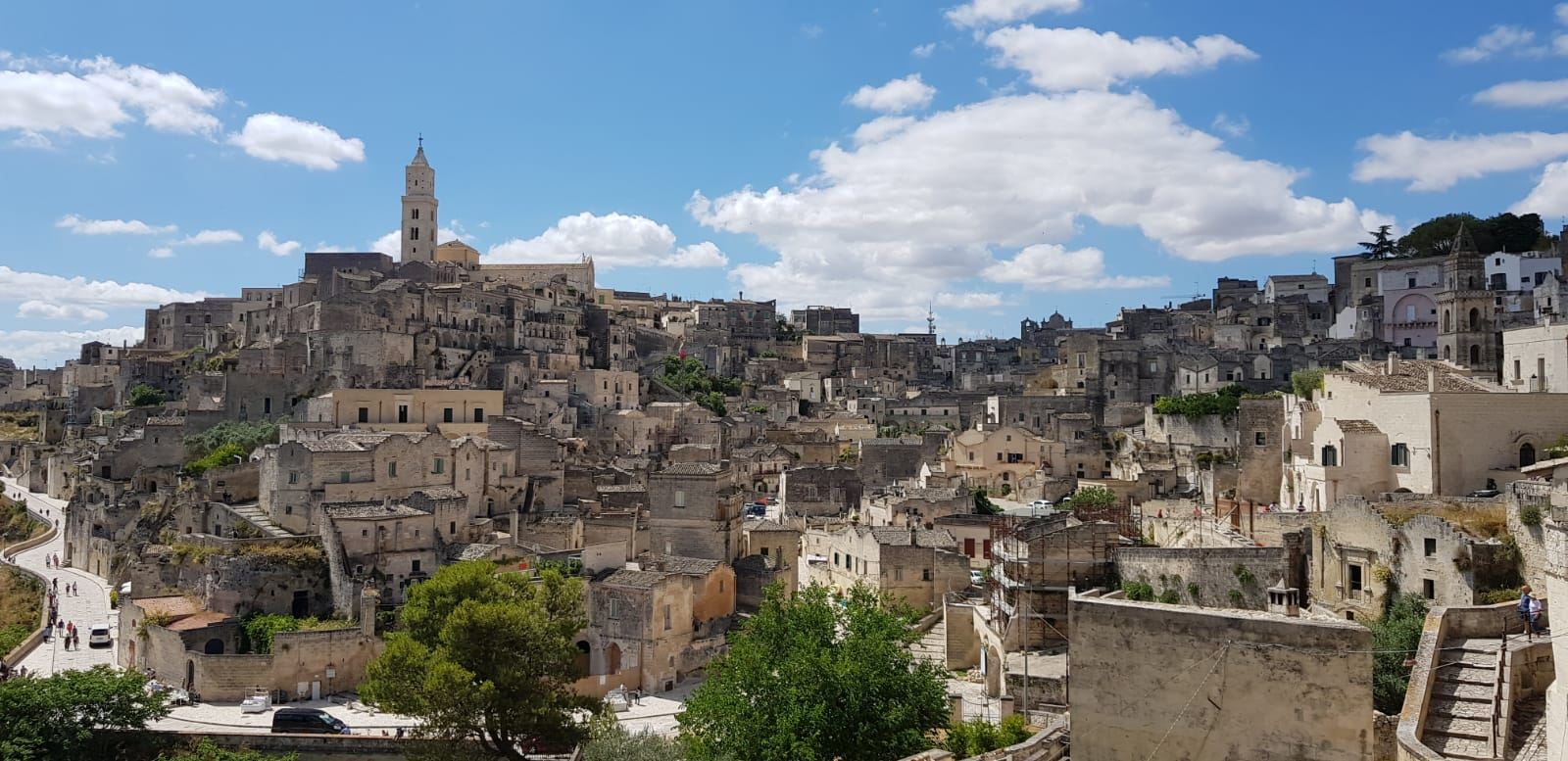
A part of Salaar: Part 1 – Ceasefire was filmed in Matera, Italy.

Principal photography commenced on 27 January 2021 at a set in Godavarikhani, a town in Telangana. Haasan joined the production two days later. An action sequence featuring Prabhas was reportedly filmed. A day later, an on-set picture of Prabhas was leaked to social media and went viral, prompting tight security to be arranged during filming. On 8 February, cinematographer Bhuvan Gowda announced that the first leg had concluded.

The second leg commenced on 3 August 2021 in Hyderabad, with the filming of a scene featuring Prabhas and Shruti. Since the filmmakers wanted Salaar to look "next level at any given angle", it became the first Indian film shot via Dark Centric Theme technology. By 12 August, the second leg concluded.

Shortly after the release of Prabhas' film Radhe Shyam in March 2022, filming was halted, mainly due to him getting a knee surgery done in Spain and later joining the sets of Kalki 2898 AD. By May 2022, 30 percent of filming was reportedly completed. The third leg was reported to begin on 24 May, but commenced instead on 18 May. The studio shared a behind-the-scenes video that day, which showcased the crew setting up a set for an action sequence. The fourth leg commenced on 28 June in Hyderabad. The schedule reportedly had a huge set erected for an action sequence, which featured Prabhas, Shruti and various fighters, stunt-choreographed by the duo Anbariv. It was reported that the schedule would be a lengthy one. In December, producer Vijay Kiragandur revealed that 85 percent of filming was finished.

Filming was reported to be in the final leg in early February 2023 and set to conclude by the end of the month. In this leg, the crew shot a 20-minute-long action sequence in the middle of the sea, at a cost of around ₹10 crore (US$1.1 million). Haasan joined the sets on 10 February, after being busy for the post-production and release works for Veera Simha Reddy and Waltair Veerayya. She completed filming her portions by 23 February. In mid March, production moved to Matera, Italy; filming would then continue in Naples, then Rome and Budapest. The initial release date of 28 September 2023 was postponed due to reshoots in mid-September. It was reported that after watching the final edit, Neel felt that there was room for improvement. In late October, a "big war sequence" was filmed, featuring over 750 vehicles, including jeeps, tanks and trunks. Principal photography wrapped after a total of 114 working days over nearly three years.

=== Post-production ===
In December 2022, Vijay Kiragandur stated that visual effects work would take around six months. By August 2023, post-production work was moved to Basroor village in Karnataka, where composer Ravi Basrur's studio is located, reportedly to ensure security and prevent leaks. Shruti Haasan began dubbing her portions in mid-August 2023, and did so in Telugu, Kannada, Tamil, Malayalam and Hindi. She completed her dubbing work by early September. Prithviraj Sukumaran would do likewise by 10 December.

Approximately 600 VFX shots were still pending in mid-September which, along with the reshoots, caused the postponement of the original 28 September release date.

== Soundtrack ==
The music and background score is composed by Ravi Basrur, in his fourth collaboration with Neel after Ugramm, KGF: Chapter 1 and KGF: Chapter 2. The audio rights were acquired by Divo. The first single titled "Sooreede" was released on 13 December 2023. Three more singles—"Prathi Gaadhalo", "Sound of Salaar" and "Vinaraa"—followed on 21, 22 and 26 December respectively. The entire soundtrack album was released on 31 December 2023.

== Marketing ==
When the teaser of Salaar: Part 1 – Ceasefire was released on 6 July 2023, it had more than 83 million views in 24 hours, breaking the record for an Indian film. The first trailer of the film was released on 1 December 2023. The second trailer was released on 18 December 2023.

== Release ==
=== Theatrical ===
Salaar Part 1 – Ceasefire was theatrically released on 22 December 2023 in standard and IMAX formats. It was released in Telugu along with dubbed versions of Kannada, Tamil, Malayalam, & Hindi languages. The film received an A (adults only) certification from the Central Board of Film Certification on account of intense action sequences and violence. The makers expected a U/A (parental guidance) classification, but were unwilling to make cuts, and since the board had updated their rules, the makers accepted the adult classification.

Earlier in August 2021, it was announced that the film was going to release on 14 April 2022. The film was later postponed due to Neel and Hombale's film, KGF: Chapter 2 which was scheduled to release on that date. In March 2022, producer Vijay Kiragandur in an interview with Pinkvilla stated that the film was postponed to the second quarter (April–June) of 2023 due to production delays owing to the COVID-19 pandemic. In August 2022, the release date was announced as 28 September 2023 but postponed to 22 December 2023. On 5 July 2024, the film released in Japan, achieving the third-biggest opening for an Indian film.

=== Distribution ===
It was released by the production house Hombale Films in Karnataka and rest of Telangana. The film was distributed in North America by Moksha Movies and Prathyangira Cinemas jointly. AA Films acquired the distribution rights in North India while Prithviraj Productions acquired the distributed rights in Kerala. Mythri Movie Makers acquired the Nizam area distribution rights. The film was distributed across Andhra Pradesh by Sree Siri Sai Cinemas, Lakshmi Narasimha Sri Manikanta Films, Geeta Film Distributor, KSN Tele Films, Sri Vengamamba Cinemas and Shilpakala Entertainments. The Tamil Nadu distribution rights were acquired by Red Giant Movies.

=== Home media ===
Salaar earned ₹350 crore (US$37 million) from non-theatrical distribution rights including satellite, digital and audio before release. Disney Star acquired the satellite rights of Telugu and other dubbed versions. The digital streaming rights were acquired by Netflix for five languages. The film was premiered on Netflix from 20 January 2024 in Telugu and dubbed versions of Kannada, Tamil and Malayalam languages. An English dubbed version began streaming from 5 February 2024. The Hindi dubbed version premiered on Disney+ Hotstar from 16 February 2024. The original Telugu-language version of the film was premiered on television on 21 April 2024 on Star Maa. The Hindi-language version was premiered on 25 May 2024 on Star Gold. The film was also released in Japanese Blu-ray version on 4 December 2024.

== Reception ==
=== Critical response ===
Salaar: Part 1 – Ceasefire received generally positive reviews from critics. On the review aggregator website Rotten Tomatoes, 73% of 22 critics' reviews are positive, with an average rating of 5.9/10. The website's consensus reads: "Salaar: Part 1 - Ceasefire leavens its non-stop action with well-written characters who keep things engaging even as the set pieces threaten to overwhelm."

The film received praise for the direction, performances, storyline, action sequences, BGM and world building of Khansaar but received criticism for its First Half and similarities with Ugramm and KGF.

Paul Nicodemus of The Times of India gave the film 3.5/5 and wrote "It is a riveting watch for those with a taste for grand and epic narratives. Fans of Prabhas and Prithviraj Sukumaran will find much to admire in this intense and captivating film. It's a film that will entertain and impress with its scale, but might require some patience in the initial stages." Janany K of India Today gave the film 3.5/5 and wrote "Salaar: Part 1 - Ceasefire is a mass masala action entertainer that celebrates Prabhas's stardom. Now, get ready for Salaar: Part 2 - Shouryaanga Parvam". S. Devasankar of Pinkvilla gave the film 3/5 and wrote "Prashanth Neel's Telugu debut is nothing short of a masterpiece, a visual spectacle. The film engages fans with brilliantly choreographed action sequences without losing track of the underlying story and drama. Prithviraj Sukumaran was right when he said that Salaar at its core is a drama. The drama definitely works out, and the filmmaker has hit it out of the park, with the help of his star-studded cast."

Bollywood Hungama gave the film 3/5 and wrote "On the whole, Salaar: Part 1 – Ceasefire boasts of whistle-worthy moments that will be loved by the masses. However, the excessive violence, a needlessly complicated second half and a limited showcasing due to Dunki will affect its box office prospects to an extent." Mayur Sanap of Rediff gave the film 3/5 and wrote "[Prashanth] Neel ups the ante on all of the formulaic elements from KGF by instilling them with more ambition and technical dazzle that sustain his bonkers vision." Sangeetha Deva Dundoo of The Hindu wrote "Salaar is tailored to cater to lovers of mass action entertainers. There is a lot of indulgent ‘build up’ with nearly every character — the mother, Obulamma, Rama, the businessman who fears for his daughter Aadya, the children, and several aides — talks in exalted terms about Deva at regular intervals. At one point, I wanted the film to cut the chase and tell us what makes him a fiery warlord."

Saibal Chatterjee of NDTV gave the film 2.5/5 and wrote "Solid star turns from Prabhas and Prithviraj Sukumaran are the main draws of Salaar: Part 1 - Ceasefire. The rest of the film's appeal lies in the lure of unbridled excess." Sonil Dedhia of News18 gave the film 2.5/5 and wrote "Overall, Salaar is only for Prabhas fans and for those who feel an assault on the senses is a form of cinema. But if you love your eardrums and have had your fill of the super-heroic exploits of an underdog-turned-top dog hero, you can give this film a probable miss." Shubhra Gupta of The Indian Express gave the film 2/5 and wrote "Salaar Part 2 promises more, more, more. Are we ready for it? Most of part one is eye-glazing enough, making you numb to the murder and mayhem: all noise, meaning very little."

Monika Rawal Kukreja of Hindustan Times wrote: "Prabhas makes a stellar comeback, film snatches Animal's 'most violent movie of the year' crown."

=== Box office ===
Salaar: Part 1 – Ceasefire earned ₹108 crore (US$12 million) domestically on the first day while it collected a total of ₹178.70 crore (US$19 million) worldwide. The film emerged as the highest-grossing Telugu film of 2023, fourth highest-grossing Telugu film of all time, sixth highest-grossing South Indian film of all time, Fifth highest-grossing Indian film of 2023 and 15th highest-grossing Indian film of all time. It has grossed ₹612–617 crore worldwide.

== Accolades ==
Award (Note: Awards, festivals and organizations are in alphabetical order.)	Date of ceremony (Note: Date is linked to the article about the awards held that year, wherever possible.)	Category	Recipient(s)	Result	Ref.
South Indian International Movie Awards	14 September 2024	SIIMA Award for Best Cinematographer – Telugu	Bhuvan Gowda	Won	

== Sequel ==
The sequel to the film, titled Salaar: Part 2 – Shouryaanga Parvam, was revealed at the end of the film. In January 2024, Kiragandur confirmed that the script is ready. The filming of the sequel continued from August 2024 in Ramoji Film City. While, Hombale Films planned the sequel's release in 2025, the filming of the sequel is set to begin only after June 2027.
