= KGF: Chapter 1 =

2018 Indian film by Prashanth Neel

- Theatrical release poster in Kannada
- Directed by: Prashanth Neel
- Written by: Prashanth Neel
- Dialogues by: Prasanth Neel; M. Chandramoli; Vinay Shivagangi
- Produced by: Vijay Kiragandur
- Starring: Yash; Srinidhi Shetty; Vasishta N. Simha; Ramachandra Raju; Archana Jois; Anant Nag; Achyuth Kumar; Malavika Avinash; T. S. Nagabharana; B. Suresha
- Narrated by: Anant Nag
- Cinematography: Bhuvan Gowda
- Edited by: Srikanth
- Music by: Ravi Basrur
- Production company: Hombale Films
- Distributed by: see below
- Release dates: 20 December 2018 (United States, Canada); 21 December 2018 (India)
- Running time: 155 minutes
- Country: India
- Language: Kannada
- Budget: ₹80 crore
- Box office: est.₹250 crore

KGF: Chapter 1 is a 2018 Indian Kannada-language period action film written and directed by Prashanth Neel, and produced by Vijay Kiragandur under the banner of Hombale Films. It is the first installment in the KGF series, followed by KGF: Chapter 2. The film stars Yash, Srinidhi Shetty, Vasishta N. Simha, Ramachandra Raju, Archana Jois, Anant Nag, Achyuth Kumar, Malavika Avinash, T. S. Nagabharana and B. Suresha. Filmed on a budget of ₹80 crore (equivalent to ₹117 crore or US$12 million in 2026), it was the most expensive Kannada film at the time of its release. In the film, Rocky, a high-ranking mercenary, working for a prominent gold mafia in Bombay, seeks power and wealth in order to fulfill his mother's promise. Due to his high fame, the leaders of the gold mafia where he works hire him to assassinate Garuda, the son of the founder of Kolar Gold Fields.

The film's development began in early 2015, after Neel finished writing the screenplay. Filming began two years later, in January 2017. Most of the film is set in the Kolar Gold Fields and was filmed in locales such as Kolar, Mysore, and parts of North Karnataka. The film's production was completed in August 2018. Bhuvan Gowda handled the cinematography and Srikanth edited the film. Composer Ravi Basrur scored the film.

The Kannada version of K.G.F: Chapter 1 was released on 20 December 2018 and the dubbed versions in Telugu, Tamil, Malayalam and Hindi released the next day. The film received positive reviews from critics and dialogues from the film became famous worldwide. The film did well commercially and earned ₹250 crore (equivalent to ₹365 crore or US$39 million in 2026) in its entire theatrical run, becoming the highest-grossing Kannada film until it was surpassed by its sequel. It turned out to be a cult hit. At the 66th National Film Awards, the film won two awards for Stunt Choreography and Best Special Effects. At the 66th Filmfare Awards South, the film won two awards from five nominations, including the award for Best Film and Best Actor for Yash.

== Plot ==
Journalist Anand Ingalagi's controversial book El Dorado, which documents the history of the Kolar Gold Fields (K.G.F.) from 1951 to 2018, is banned by the Government of India. Despite the prohibition, a television news channel obtains a copy and interviews Ingalagi about the events described in the book.

1951, Raja "Rocky" Krishnappa Bairya is born to Shanti, a poverty-stricken and terminally ill woman. On the very same day, government officials, accompanied by crime lord Suryavardhan, arrive in southern Mysore to investigate a strange yellow stone unearthed by labourers digging a well. Upon discovering that the stone is gold ore, Suryavardhan murders the officials and secures a 99-year lease on the land under the pretence of operating a limestone quarry named Narachi. In reality, he secretly establishes K.G.F. and builds a vast criminal empire around its wealth.

To oversee his operations, Suryavardhan appoints five trusted associates: his ruthless younger brother Adheera, who commands security within K.G.F.; Kamal, the son of Suryavardhan's late associate Bhargav, who supervises the gold refinery in Varca; Rajendra Desai, who manages the transportation of gold shipments; Andrews, who controls gold smuggling along the western coast; and Guru Pandian, leader of the DYSS party, who provides political protection and influence.

After suffering a debilitating stroke, Suryavardhan names his elder son Garuda as the heir to K.G.F., expecting Adheera to remain loyal and support his nephew. However, greed and ambition soon divide the organization, and several of Suryavardhan's associates begin plotting to eliminate Garuda. Adheera eventually attempts to assassinate him but is presumed dead after Garuda retaliates by bombing his vehicle.

Meanwhile, Rocky grows up in the streets of Bombay, driven by a promise he made to his dying mother: to attain immense wealth and power. At the age of ten, he begins working for Shetty, a gold smuggler and subordinate of Andrews, who is locked in a fierce rivalry with Dubai-based crime syndicate leader Inayat Khalil. Over the years, Rocky steadily rises through the ranks and eventually gains control over the arrival of gold shipments along the Bombay coast.

Recognizing Rocky's growing influence and ambition, Andrews offers him complete control of the Bombay underworld in exchange for assassinating Garuda. Rocky accepts the assignment and travels to Bangalore, where a grand ceremony unveiling a statue of Suryavardhan has been organized to lure Garuda out of K.G.F. Desai, Andrews, Kamal, and Andrews' secretary Daya secretly arrange for a pistol to be delivered to Rocky, but the operation fails after Garuda's guards discover the weapon. Garuda later reveals that he replaced his father's statue with one of himself, exposing the conspiracy and asserting his authority.

After witnessing the immense power and fear Garuda commands, Rocky realizes that killing him outside K.G.F. would be nearly impossible. He therefore decides to infiltrate K.G.F. itself. Within the mines, workers abducted from surrounding villages are forced to endure brutal slavery under inhumane conditions. Rocky deliberately allows himself to be captured and transported into K.G.F. disguised as a laborer.

Inside the mines, Rocky secretly obtains a map of the facility from the maintenance room during a roll call. He narrowly escapes death after a fellow slave sacrifices himself in an attempt to save his pregnant wife. Believing Rocky to have been killed, Andrews, Kamal, and Desai assume the mission has failed.

Initially indifferent to the suffering around him, Rocky undergoes a profound change after witnessing a guard mercilessly murder a woman and her child. Enraged, he single-handedly fights and kills an entire squad of twenty-three guards to protect a blind elderly slave. The act transforms him into a symbol of hope among the oppressed workers. Rocky then orders the slaves to burn the guards' bodies so news of his survival reaches Andrews and his associates through informants Kulkarni and Garuda's younger brother Virat.

As Garuda prepares to investigate the disturbance, Virat murders the bedridden Suryavardhan in an attempt to divert him back to the palace. Exploiting the chaos, Rocky uses the map to navigate a hidden tunnel connecting the mines to Garuda's mansion.

Disturbed by the escalating unrest, Garuda reschedules the annual Maa Kaali ritual for the following day. During the ceremony, he plans to execute three captured assassins as offerings to the goddess before turning against his father's former allies. However, Vanaram, the head of security, discovers that one of the assassins has already been killed inside his prison cell and realizes that an intruder has infiltrated the mansion.

As Garuda publicly beheads two of the captives during the ritual, Rocky—disguised as the third assassin—suddenly reveals himself and decapitates Garuda before the stunned crowd. The enslaved workers erupt in celebration and accept Rocky as their new leader.

Ingalagi concludes that Rocky deliberately chose K.G.F. as the site of Garuda's assassination in order to ignite rebellion among the oppressed workers and build an army capable of seizing control of the gold empire. However, he hints that this victory marks only the beginning of Rocky's rise to power.

News of Garuda's death quickly spreads across the criminal underworld and political circles, reaching Inayat Khalil and Ramika Sen, the future Prime Minister of India. Adheera, revealed to have survived the earlier assassination attempt, prepares to re-emerge and reclaim his place within the empire. Meanwhile, Desai, Kamal, Andrews, Daya, Khalil, and Shetty each celebrate Garuda's death for their own reasons. As Vanaram orders his forces to attack Rocky and the liberated workers, a gunshot rings out.

== Cast ==
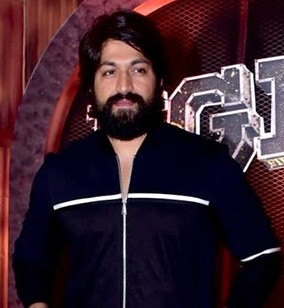
Yash at KGF Chapter 1 event

- Yash as Raja Krishnappa Bairya aka "Rocky"
  - Anmol Vijay as young Rocky
- Srinidhi Shetty as Reena Desai
- Vasishta N. Simha as Kamal
- Ramachandra Raju as Garuda, Suryavardhan's eldest son
- Archana Jois as Shanthamma, Rocky's mother
- Anant Nag as Anand Ingalagi, the author of El Dorado
  - Ashok Sharma as young Anand Ingalagi
- Achyuth Kumar as Guru Pandian, DYSS party president
- Ramesh Indira as Suryavardhan, the founder of KGF's political cult and father of Garuda and Virat
- Vinay Bidappa as Virat, Garuda's younger brother
- Lakki Lakshman as Rajendra Desai, Reena's father
- B. S. Avinash as Andrews, Shetty's boss
- Tarak Ponnappa as Daya, Andrews' secretary
- Dinesh Mangaluru as Shetty, Rocky's employer
- Harish Rai as Khasim, Shetty's aide and Rocky's confidant
- Balakrishna as Inayat Khalil, a Dubai based don
- T. S. Nagabharana as Srinivas, the owner of TV news channel 24/News
- Malavika Avinash as Deepa Hegde, the chief editor of 24/News
- Govinde Gowda as a peon at 24/News
- Mohan Juneja as Nagaraju, an informer to Ingalagi
- Ayyappa P. Sharma as Vanaram, commander of KGF
- John Kokken as John, overseer of KGF
- Puneeth Rudranag as Rugga, overseer at the KGF mines
- Neenasam Ashwath as Kulkarni
- B. Suresha as Vittal, a slave at KGF
- Srinivas Murthy as Narayan, a slave at KGF
- Yash Shetty as Shyam, archaeological department officer
- Lakshmipathi as Kencha, a slave at KGF, the storyteller
- Roopa Rayappa as Shanthi, a slave at KGF
- Krishnoji Rao as an old blind man working in KGF
- Surya Shekhar as Dilawar
- Sampath Maitreya as Shanti's husband
- Tamannaah Bhatia as Milky in the song "Jokae" (special appearance)
- Mouni Roy as Lucy in the song "Gali Gali" (special appearance; Hindi version)

== Production ==
=== Pre-production ===
Following the success of Mr. and Mrs. Ramachari (2014), Yash signed for four projects as of March 2015, including one with director Prashanth Neel (of Ugramm fame). The project, KGF, about an ambitious man and his life in the 1970s, was considered to be one of the most expensive films in Kannada cinema. Hombale Films, the production house led by Vijay Kiragandur, bankrolled the project, and one of its production executive Karthik Gowda, stated that "KGF, which is set in the 70s, took over one and a half years of pre-production, because they wanted to ensure they got every single detail right, be it the matchboxes, telephone, or the clothes people wore." The film's director, Prashanth Neel, stated that the film would be launched in April 2016, and the shooting would begin in May 2016. Ravi Basrur, who earlier scored music for the director's Ugramm, was hired for the project, while Bhuvan Gowda handled the cinematography.

In an interview with The Times of India, Prashanth Neel stated that he planned to split the film in two parts, as the narration of the story is in a non-linear format. The decision to split the film into two parts also had to do with its commercial prospects. He further added “The scale of the project is huge and we had a scope for a beginning, an interval, and an end for both parts, so it made sense for us to release it as two parts”. As for the decision to make it a multilingual release, he says that it was because the film is based on a unique idea and has a universal theme. About the rumours of doing KGF as a "Tamil version, with Suriya being roped in, but failing to do so", he stated that it was meant to be a Kannada film.

In December 2020, during the making of its second installment, Prasanth Neel denied rumours of a third installment in the KGF franchise, claiming that the story would conclude in its second part.

=== Development ===
The film's cast consists mostly of completely new faces. The cast members sported rugged looks, given the subject and setting of the film. Yash grew his beard and long hair for his role as Rocky, a slick and a suave person of the 1970s. Bangalore-based model Srinidhi Shetty, a winner of the Miss Supranational 2016, was cast alongside Yash. Srinidhi, a self-confessed fan of Yash, claimed that she had watched his films Drama and Mr. and Mrs. Ramachari, and stated that he is one of the actors to whom she looks forward. In August 2017, Vasishta Simha bagged a pivotal role in the film, while Ramya Krishnan and Nassar were falsely reported to be a part of the film.

In July 2016, the filmmakers kick-started a 15-day schedule in North Karnataka, without Yash, as the actor was shooting for Santhu Straight Forward (2016). The first schedule of the film took place on a huge set, which took more than 35–40 days to construct. The film was slated to take off earlier that year, but was pushed back because of problems surrounding the Kalasa Banduri issue, which meant the team had to cancel its initial shoot schedule plans. The schedule was further complicated by Yash's break from shooting films, in order to focus on his wedding to Radhika Pandit, which was held in Bangalore in December 2016.

=== Filming ===
The film's shooting began on 15 January 2017, after completing the final stages of pre-production. On 25 January 2017, the filmmakers erected huge sets at Badami, to replicate Kolar in the period of 1970–80, thereby filming extensively in the location. The art director Shivakumar recreated the Kolar Gold Fields film set of the 1980s and VFX was used as an extension for the film. Aware that a freak accident happened at the sets of Masti Gudi (2017), claiming the lives of two actors, producer Kirangadur secured an insurance cover for the crew members working on the film. As of 25 June 2017, the project was 50 percent complete, and production had restarted after sets were rebuilt, following their destruction by heavy rains.

As a part of the film's shoot, the filmmakers painted a portion of the Jayalakshmi Vilas Mansion, which is located on the campus of University of Mysore. Some sequences of the movie, which has Yash and Srinidhi Shetty in the lead roles, were also shot at the centenary clock tower located next to the campus. Yash entered the final schedule of the film in April 2018. In May 2018, actors Malavika Avinash and Anant Nag filmed the interview sequence, one of the major scenes in the film's storyline. At the end of the month, Yash had announced that he had completed his portions, and started dubbing for the film. As of May 2018, the filmmakers completed major portions of the film, except one song.

In August 2018, Kajal Aggarwal was reported to shoot for a song sequence, thus marking her debut in Kannada. However, on 9 August, Tamannaah Bhatia was hired for a song number, thus marking her second film appearance in Kannada, after Jaguar (2016). On 17 August 2018, the filmmakers announced that shooting of the film had wrapped, although another song shoot for the film's Hindi version, featuring Yash and Mouni Roy, took place at the Goregaon Studio on 7 and 8 December.

== Themes and influences ==
In an interview with director Prashanth Neel for The Times of India about the theme of the film, he stated "'KGF' has a strong texture of gold in it, which is about greed and gold. KGF, in many ways, is akin to El Dorado. The way kings and soldiers have over the years gone looking for the mythical El Dorado, where anyone who lays claim to the place ruled the world. This is what Anant Nag (narrator) says in the film, too.” Prashant explains about the setting of the film in 1970–80, stating, "In 1978, because of the Cold War between the USA and the erstwhile Soviet Union that had affected places like Iran and Afghanistan, the price of gold went up the highest in the recorded history. Till date, one cannot find another time when the price of gold shot up so much. So, 1978 was the perfect setting for us, because the higher the price of gold, the higher the greed of men.” The film was also inspired by action films and western films like The Good, the Bad and the Ugly and For a Few Dollars More.

== Music ==
Ravi Basrur composed the soundtrack album and the film's score, while Tanishk Bagchi remastered the track "Gali Gali" from Tridev (1989) for the film's Hindi version. The audio rights of the film were purchased by Lahari Music in Kannada, Telugu, Tamil, and Malayalam for ₹3.6 crore (equivalent to ₹5.3 crore or US$560,000 in 2026), a record sum for any South Indian film; the Hindi version's audio rights were bought by T-Series.

The track "Salaam Rocky Bhai" served as the lead single from the soundtrack album. The film was released in Kannada, Tamil, Telugu, and Malayalam on 7 December 2018, along with the full soundtrack album; the album for the Hindi version was released on 9 December 2018. The karaoke versions of the songs were released on 27 December 2018.

The film's score was released in two volumes; the first volume of the original soundtrack was released on 10 September 2019, and the second volume was released on 12 October 2019.

== Marketing ==
The first look of the film was released on 3 May 2017. On 8 January 2018, coinciding with Yash's birthday, a one-minute long introductory teaser, with Ananth Nag narrating, was unveiled by the production team. After responding to a fan's request, Yash announced that the film's trailer would be released in October 2018. Farhan Akhtar shared the first look on 6 November 2018 and a second one on 8 November on the occasion of Diwali. The official trailer of the film was released on 9 November 2018. The trailer crossed more than one million views within an hour of its release.

Special promotions were planned on 4 December in Chennai, and 6 December in Hyderabad. On 9 December 2018, the makers hosted a pre-release event at the JRC Convention Centre in Hyderabad to promote the film's Telugu version. S. S. Rajamouli graced the event as the chief guest. As a part of the film's promotion, an online game, KGF, specially designed for Android mobile phones, was released by Mobi2Fun Private Limited for the Google Play Store, which saw more than 5,000 downloads upon its initial release.

== Release ==
=== Theatrical ===
On 28 August 2017, the filmmakers announced that KGF will be made as a multilingual film, released in Kannada, Telugu, Tamil, Malayalam, and Hindi languages, marking the first foray of its crew members (including Yash) into different industries. The filmmakers planned to release the film in the second half of 2018. On 19 September 2018, it was announced that the first part of the film will be released on 16 November 2018; however, the release was postponed to 21 December.

=== Distribution ===
The distribution rights for the Kannada version were bought by KRG Studios, a sister company of Hombale Films. The film's Hindi version was distributed by Ritesh Sidhwani, Farhan Akhtar and Anil Thadani under their banners Excel Entertainment and AA Films. The rights for the Tamil and Telugu dubbed versions were sold to Vishal Film Factory and Vaaraahi Chalana Chitram respectively. The Malayalam-dubbed rights of the film were sold to Global United Media.

=== Screenings and statistics ===
K.G.F: Chapter 1 received a U/A certificate from the Central Board of Film Certification in early December 2018. It was reported that the film would be released to 1,800–2,200 screens worldwide, the widest ever release for a Kannada film. However, it was later reported that the film was released to 2,460 screens, including 1,500 for the Hindi version, 400 each for Kannada and Telugu, 100 for Tamil and 60 for Malayalam.

Following advance booking response, the filmmakers allotted early morning shows at 4:00 a.m. for the preview. The film was released in the U.S. and Canada on 20 December 2018 and in India the following day. The day also saw releases in parts of Africa, Hong Kong, New Zealand and parts of Eastern Europe, including Cyprus, the first in these regions for a Kannada film. The film released in Malaysia on 28 December and in United Kingdom on 4 January 2019.

The Hindi-dubbed version of the film was released to 71 screens in Pakistan on 11 January and became the first Kannada film to be released there, although Lucia (2013) was screened at film festivals and had no theatrical release in the country.

=== Film festivals ===
KGF was screened at the 11th Bengaluru International Film Festival on 28 February 2019, where it received an award for the Best Picture in the Entertainment category, and was adjudged the most popular Kannada film by the jury members.

=== Lawsuit ===
On 20 December 2018, the 10th Additional Chief Metropolitan Magistrate court in Bengaluru had passed an interim stay before the film's release, following two petitions, filed by Venkatesh G, Yogesh and Ratan, citing plagiarism allegations, and also accusing the filmmakers of portraying Kolar's history in a poor light. However, the producer Kiragandur stated that the film will be released on the said date, and asked fans to avoid rumours. On 27 December 2018, the filmmakers issued a statement that the shows in Australia were cancelled due to an unauthorized screening, as the distributors of the film did not consult the producers of the original.

=== Piracy ===
On 18 December 2018, a few scenes from the film were leaked on social networking sites, although Karthik Gowda, the executive producer, labeled it a rumour and clarified that the filmmakers have created a team to fight against online piracy. Despite preventative measures, pirated versions of the film were made available before its release. In May 2020, the producers sued a local television channel for premiering the film's Telugu version illegally.

=== Home media ===
The film's digital rights were sold to Amazon Prime Video for ₹18 crore (equivalent to ₹24 crore or US$2.6 million in 2026), and premiered on 5 February 2019, along with its dubbed versions.

The Hindi dubbed version was also released on YouTube channel Goldmines Telefilms on 13 December 2020.

=== Re-release ===
The film was re-released at 35 locations in the United States on 31 January 2019, becoming the first Kannada film to be re-released in the country. On 1 November 2019, coinciding with the occasion of Karnataka Rajyotsava, the filmmakers re-released the film at 25–30 centres across Karnataka, with a week run during its release. The film's Hindi version was re-released in PVR, Inox and Cinepolis theatres, on 23–29 October 2020.

== Reception ==
=== Box office ===
On the first day of its release, KGF: Chapter 1 collected ₹25 crore (equivalent to ₹36 crore or US$3.9 million in 2026) worldwide, which was the highest opening in the Kannada cinema. KGF recorded a massive opening in Karnataka with collections of around ₹12.50 crore in Kannada language. In Karnataka's capital Bengaluru alone, the film earned about ₹5 crore (equivalent to ₹7.3 crore or US$780,000 in 2026) on the first day. The film registered a gross of ₹59.61 crore (equivalent to ₹87 crore or US$9.3 million in 2026) at the worldwide box office on its first three days, becoming the fastest Kannada film to gross ₹50 crore (equivalent to ₹73 crore or US$7.8 million in 2026). The film grossed around ₹113 crore (equivalent to ₹165 crore or US$18 million in 2026) worldwide in the first week of its release, becoming the first Kannada film to gross ₹100 crore (equivalent to ₹146 crore or US$16 million in 2026). On 9 January 2019, trade analysts announced that the film entered the ₹200 crore (equivalent to ₹271 crore or US$29 million in 2026) mark, thus becoming the first Kannada film to do so. It went on to gross around ₹250 crore (equivalent to ₹339 crore or US$36 million in 2026) and completed a theatrical run of over 100 days in a couple of centres in Karnataka.

==== India ====
On the first day of release, KGF: Chapter 1 collected ₹18.1 crore (equivalent to ₹26 crore or US$2.8 million in 2026) net at the domestic box office. The Hindi version raked in more than ₹2 crore (equivalent to ₹2.9 crore or US$310,000 in 2026) at the box office on the first day. On the second day, the film outdid its first day totals, with a worldwide total of ₹25 crore (equivalent to ₹36 crore or US$3.9 million in 2026). First weekend totals stood at around ₹59.6 crore (equivalent to ₹87 crore or US$9.3 million in 2026) worldwide from all versions, whereas the Hindi-dubbed version collected over ₹9 crore (equivalent to ₹13 crore or US$1.4 million in 2026). On the fourth day, the film collected approximately ₹80 crore (equivalent to ₹117 crore or US$12 million in 2026) while the Hindi version saw a jump of 45% on Monday. On 25 December 2018, the film saw a steep incline on the box office due to the Christmas holidays, collecting more than ₹84 crore (equivalent to ₹123 crore or US$13 million in 2026) upon release. The fifth day totals stood at up to ₹100 crore (equivalent to ₹146 crore or US$16 million in 2026).

The film collected more than ₹105 crore (equivalent to ₹153 crore or US$16 million in 2026) at the domestic box office in the first week of release. After ten days, the film had collected ₹87 crore (equivalent to ₹127 crore or US$14 million in 2026) from Karnataka, ₹1.6 crore (equivalent to ₹2.3 crore or US$250,000 in 2026) from Kerala, ₹6.1 crore (equivalent to ₹8.9 crore or US$950,000 in 2026) from Tamil Nadu, and ₹14.5 crore (equivalent to ₹21 crore or US$2.3 million in 2026) from Telugu-speaking states. The film entered the ₹100 crore (US$11 million) mark in Karnataka on the fifteenth day of box office, thus becoming the first film in Karnataka to do so.

It collected over ₹134 crore (equivalent to ₹196 crore or US$21 million in 2026) in Karnataka, becoming the highest-grossing film in that state, and beating the previous record set by Baahubali 2: The Conclusion. The film collected ₹24.39 crore (equivalent to ₹33 crore or US$3.5 million in 2026) in Andhra Pradesh and Telangana, ₹3.18 crore (equivalent to ₹4.3 crore or US$460,000 in 2026) in Kerala, and ₹8.82 crore (equivalent to ₹12 crore or US$1.3 million in 2026) in Tamil Nadu; the film earned more than ₹172 crore (equivalent to ₹233 crore or US$25 million in 2026) across theatres across South India. Its Hindi version earned more than ₹40.39 crore (equivalent to ₹55 crore or US$5.9 million in 2026); it became the fourth-highest grossing Hindi-dubbed film after the Baahubali franchise and 2.0 of the that time. The film earned more than ₹204 crore (equivalent to ₹298 crore or US$32 million in 2026) at the domestic box office.

==== Other territories ====
Premiering at more than 100 theatres in 50 locations, K.G.F became the fastest Kannada film to cross $200k and $300k in the United States box office. As of 25 December, the film earned $413,214, becoming the first Kannada film to earn $400k at the box office. Within the end of the first week, K.G.F collected more than $522,848 at the box office, becoming the first Sandalwood film to cross a half million ($500k) dollars in United States.

During the second weekend, the film grossed $146,207, to take its total tally to $669,055, and it crossed the $700k mark within the second week. Thereafter, the tally saw a normal dip and the film ended its lifetime total at $805,637 in the country.

Apart from the US, the film collected £22,656 in United Kingdom, $9,539 in New Zealand, and RM 11,406 in Malaysia, to collect a cumulative $1.5 million in overseas profits.

=== Critical response ===
On the review aggregator website Rotten Tomatoes, 67% of 9 critics' reviews are positive, with an average rating of 5.6/10.

K.G.F: Chapter 1 received positive reviews from critics. While its story plot, cinematography, action sequences, music, narration, direction and cast performances of the ensemble cast received acclaim, critics had mixed comments about the screenplay and editing. However the film's dialogues became famous worldwide, especially Yash and Anant Nag's dialogues.

Reviewing for Deccan Herald, Vivek M. V. felt that the "grandeur" lay in the film's "fantastically gripping story". He praised the film's narration, its "brilliant" editing, and "riveting sequences". Sunayana Suresh of The Times of India gave the film rating of 3 1/2 stars out of five, writing that it had a "fast-paced first half ... but the second half and the climax sets up the right premise for the second part of the film." She called the screenplay's "non-linear" fashion the "most interesting part of the film". She commended Yash's performance, in that he "lives his character to the fullest". Troy Ribeiro of News18 echoed her sentiment, writing, "Yash's endurance, strife and sincerity ... get projected as perfunctory" in the context of "tight close-ups and mid-shots the camera stops us from getting emotionally connected to" every actor in the film. He further wrote, "With intense atmospheric lighting, every frame in the film looks aesthetic and natural. Brilliant cinematography and equally challenging action sequences are put together with razor-sharp edits. They give the film a racy pace." Priyanka Sundar of Hindustan Times called the film a "story of greed and redemption" that "burns bright". While praising the "promising" background score, "sharp" editing, and "stunning" visuals, she felt that the screenplay could have been "tighter".

Janani K. of India Today felt the film was "dragged and over-stretched", and gave it a three out of five-star rating. While she commended Yash's "extraordinary performance" and the "brilliantly choreographed stunt sequences", she wrote that despite having "universal theme, [the film] gets lost in translation, thanks to sloppy editing and atrocious dialogues." Subha J. Rao of Firstpost gave the film a similar rating, and praised the film's music, cinematography, and art direction, particularly the latter in "bringing alive the grime and heat of the gold mines". However, she felt "[t]ighter editing ... would have smoothened out the kinks" in the film. Shashiprasad S. M. of Deccan Chronicle scored the film 2 1/2 stars out of five, describing the film as "a visual spectacle". Barring that, he felt it fell short of "instilling the much-needed life into it." Karthik Keramalu of Film Companion felt that the film fell short of "becoming a great movie by a long mile". He dismissed the dialogue delivered by Yash's character as a "lengthy sermon about his own valour", while also criticizing the film's editing.

Excluding what he described the film's climax as "spectacular with the support of a brilliant cast" and "spot-on" sets and location, Muralidhara Khajane of The Hindu felt there was "nothing in the film that we have not seen before". While writing that "[t]here is a certain finesse to the edgy, moody cinematography", he concluded that the film lacked a "soul, a believable story, and a rounded protagonist." Manoj Kumar R. of The Indian Express scored the film 2 1/2 stars out of five, deeming it "[a]n overstretched exercise in hero worship". While drawing comparisons of certain scenes to those from Baahubali, he felt the film had a "flimsy storyline", which he added was made up for by its "terrific background orchestra". Also writing for the same news publication, Shubhra Gupta drew comparisons of the film in plot to those of Nayakan, Deewaar, and Parinda in its first half. She felt that the film had "nothing more" than "striking cinematography, and the brown and sepia colours which suffuse the screen."

The character of Rocky was well received by critics. Janani K. of India Today said that "You take a look at [Rocky] and instantly you know that this guy will do the impossible and pull people out of their misery." Sunaina Suresh of The Times of India said that "The growth of Rocky is shown steadily and the makers kept a clever story telling pattern right through that keeps pace with the narrative." Suresh further added: "The first chapter shows Rocky as the maverick mastermind who will stop at nothing in order to achieve his mission." Troy Ribeiro of News18 said that "Rocky is the new Superhero in the town."

== Accolades ==
Year	Ceremony	Category	Recipient(s)	Result	Ref.
2018	2018 Karnataka State Film Awards	Best Music Director	Ravi Basrur	Won	
2018	2018 Karnataka State Film Awards	Best Art Director	Shiva Kumar K	Won	
2019	Zee Kannada Hemmeya Kanndiga Awards	Best Film	K.G.F	Won	
2019	Zee Kannada Hemmeya Kanndiga Awards	Best Director	Prashanth Neel	Won	
2019	Zee Kannada Hemmeya Kanndiga Awards	Best Actor	Yash	Won	
2019	Zee Kannada Hemmeya Kanndiga Awards	Best Cinematographer	Bhuvan Gowda	Won	
2019	Zee Kannada Hemmeya Kanndiga Awards	Best Music Director	Ravi Basrur	Won	
2019	Zee Kannada Hemmeya Kanndiga Awards	Best Villain	Ramachandra Raju	Won	
2019	Zee Kannada Hemmeya Kanndiga Awards	Best Lyricist	V. Nagendra Prasad	Won	
2019	Zee Kannada Hemmeya Kanndiga Awards	Voice Of The Year	Vijay Prakash	Won	
2019	66th National Film Awards	Best Special Effects	Unifi Media	Won	
2019	66th National Film Awards	Best Stunt Choreography	Vikram More, Anbariv	Won	
2019	8th SIIMA Awards	Best Film	K.G.F	Won	
2019	8th SIIMA Awards	Best Actor	Yash	Won	
2019	8th SIIMA Awards	Pantaloons style icon male of the year	Yash	Won	
2019	8th SIIMA Awards	Best Director	Prashanth Neel	Won	
2019	8th SIIMA Awards	Best Actor in a Negative Role	Ramachandra Raju	Nominated	
2019	8th SIIMA Awards	Best Debut Actress	Srinidhi Shetty	Nominated	
2019	8th SIIMA Awards	Best Supporting Actress	Archana Jois	Won	
2019	8th SIIMA Awards	Best Cinematographer	Bhuvan Gowda	Won	
2019	8th SIIMA Awards	Best Music	Ravi Basrur	Won	
2019	8th SIIMA Awards	Best Supporting actor - Male	Achyuth Kumar	Won	
2019	8th SIIMA Awards	Best Playback Singer - Male	Vijay Prakash	Won	
2019	66th Filmfare Awards South	Best Film – Kannada	K.G.F: Chapter 1	Won	
2019	66th Filmfare Awards South	Best Director – Kannada	Prashanth Neel	Nominated	
2019	66th Filmfare Awards South	Best Actor – Kannada	Yash	Won	
2019	66th Filmfare Awards South	Best Music Director – Kannada	Ravi Basrur	Nominated	
2019	66th Filmfare Awards South	Best Female Debut	Srinidhi Shetty	Nominated	

== Sequel ==
Before the release of the first K.G.F film in December 2018, the filmmakers shot 20% of its second installment, with the crew doing double shifts till January 2019. The film has Yash and Srinidhi Shetty reprising their roles from the first film, while Sanjay Dutt and Raveena Tandon were cast in pivotal new roles. The shooting of the film kick-started on 13 March 2019.

K.G.F: Chapter 2 was originally scheduled to hit theatres on 23 October 2020, but its release was postponed due to the COVID-19 pandemic in India. In January 2021, the filmmakers announced a new release date of 16 July 2021 but again got postponed due to the same reason. On 22 August 2021, the filmmakers announced that the film will release on 14 April 2022. Finally Chapter 2 was released on 14 April 2022 in Kannada, and in dubbed versions for the Telugu, Hindi, Tamil, and Malayalam languages.

== Legacy ==
The success of 'KGF' means a lot to the Kannada cinema, especially to a lot of our talented technicians who don't get the due they deserve. A lot of our talented technicians have been looking for a platform and 'KGF' has provided them that pedestal. This success has boosted the morale of the Kannada industry. It has justified the talent of Prashanth Neel.

— Yash in an interview to IANS, after the success of K.G.F

The film was praised by many celebrities across the South Indian film industry. Director Pa. Ranjith praised the team after watching the trailer of the film, while Puneeth Rajkumar and Shah Rukh Khan also appreciated Yash and the filmmakers. Raveena Tandon, Rashmika Mandanna, Ram Gopal Varma, and Sumalatha Ambareesh (wife of late actor Ambareesh) also praised Yash's performance. Tamil actor Vijay, who watched a special screening of the film on 20 January 2019 in Chennai, praised the team for its brilliant filmmaking, and Yash for his performance.

Following the box office performance of the film, on 3 January 2019, the Income Tax Department raided the homes of several film stars and producers from the Kannada industry, including Yash and the film's producer, Vijay Kiragandur, and its actors have also been asked to provide details of Yash's remuneration for the film, shedding light on the fact that the movie's performance was considered to be the reason behind the IT raid.

In a March 2018 interview with IANS, Yash stated that "The success of KGF: Chapter 1 boosted the morale of the Kannada film industry. This success means a lot to all the untapped talent of our industry". K.G.F also established Kannada cinema in the multilingual film market, with the 2019 releases Pailwaan, Kurukshetra, and Avane Srimannarayana being released in multiple languages. Shjilpa Sebastian wrote an article for The Hindu, "2019: The Year when Kannada Cinema Went National", in which she stated that the film "changed the game plan for the Kannada film industry".

KGF became the most streamed film on Amazon Prime Video in 2019. Director Nagathihalli Chandrashekhar, chairman of the Karnataka Chalanachitra Academy, praised the film, stating: "We can expect more 'KGF's in the future. Not everyone can make a 'KGF', but its success can inspire more quality filmmaking using both local and international technicians."

== See also ==
- Kannada cinema
- List of films featuring slavery
- Mining in India
- Kolar Gold Fields
- KGF: Chapter 2
