= KGF (film series) =

Film series

- Official KGF film series logo
- Directed by: Prashanth Neel
- Written by: Story and screenplay: Prashanth Neel; Dialogue: SEEMAN; M. Chandramouli; Dr. Suri
- Produced by: Vijay Kiragandur
- Starring: Yash; Sanjay Dutt; Raveena Tandon; Srinidhi Shetty; Ramachandra Raju; Vasishta N. Simha; Anant Nag; Prakash Raj; Archana Jois; Malavika Avinash; Easwari Rao; Achyuth Kumar; Rao Ramesh; B. Suresha; T. S. Nagabharana
- Narrated by: Anant Nag (K.G.F : Chapter 1); Prakash Raj (K.G.F: Chapter 2); [[]] (K.G.F: Chapter 3)
- Cinematography: Bhuvan Gowda
- Edited by: Srikanth Gowda (K.G.F : Chapter 1); Ujwal Kulkarni (K.G.F: Chapter 2)
- Music by: Ravi Basrur; Tanishk Bagchi (only one song in the Hindi version of the film)
- Production company: Hombale Films
- Distributed by: KRG Studios (Kannada) (1); Hombale Films through KRG Studios and Jayanna Films (Kannada) (2); Excel Entertainment and AA Films (Hindi) (1 & 2); Vishal Film Factory (Tamil) (1); Dream Warrior Pictures (Tamil) (2); Global United Media (Malayalam) (1); Prithviraj Productions (Malayalam) (2); Varahi Chalana Chitram (Telugu) (1 & 2)
- Release dates: 21 December 2018 (K.G.F : Chapter 1); 14 April 2022 (K.G.F: Chapter 2)
- Running time: 323 minutes (2 films)
- Country: India
- Language: Kannada
- Budget: ₹180 crore (2 films)
- Box office: est. ₹1,450–1,800 crore

KGF is an Indian Kannada-language period action film series set mostly in the Kolar Gold Fields, which gives the series its name, created by Prashanth Neel and produced by Hombale Films starring Yash in lead role with an ensemble supporting cast. Set in the late 1970s and early 1980s, the series follows two narrators, Anand Ingalangi and his son Vijayendra Ingalangi, who give an interview of a book written by Anand to a leading news channel, which tells the life story of Raja Krishnappa Bairya alias Rocky (Yash), a Mumbai-based high ranking mercenary born in poverty, and how he became the most dreaded person at that time.

The first installment, Chapter 1, was released on 21 December 2018 and became the highest grossing Kannada film at the time. The sequel Chapter 2 was released on 14 April 2022. The sequel broke several opening day records and also overtook its predecessor as the highest grossing Kannada film, the first Kannada film to gross ₹500 crores and ₹1000 crores. It also went on to become the fifth highest-grossing Indian film worldwide and also the second-highest-grossing Indian film of 2022. A sequel to Chapter 2 titled KGF: Chapter 3, teased in the second film, is in early development.

== Films ==
=== KGF: Chapter 1 ===
Rocky, a high-ranking mercenary in Mumbai seeks power and wealth to fulfill his mother's promise. Due to his high fame, his bosses hire him to assassinate Garuda, the son of the founder of Kolar Gold Fields.

=== KGF: Chapter 2 ===
After having assassinated Garuda, Rocky establishes himself as the kingpin of K.G.F. He now has to deal with ruthless foes: Garuda's uncle Adheera, who wants to take control of K.G.F, Ramika Sen, the Prime Minister of India, and his bosses Andrews, Rajendra Desai, Kamal, Shetty, Daya, and Guru Pandian.

== Development ==
In March 2015, Yash signed for four projects which included one with Prashanth Neel. The project was considered to be one of the most expensive film in Kannada cinema. Hombale Films, the production house led by Vijay Kiragandur, were announced to be bankrolling the project, and one of its production executives Karthik Gowda, stated that "KGF, which is set in the 70s, took a year and a half of pre-production, because they wanted to ensure they got every single detail right, be it the matchboxes, telephone, or the clothes people wore." Neel, stated that the film would be launched in April 2016, and the shooting would begin in May 2016. Ravi Basrur was also hired for the project, while Bhuvan Gowda handled the cinematography.

In an interview with The Times of India, Prashanth Neel stated that he planned to split the film in two parts, as the narration of the story is in a non-linear format. He further stated "The scale of the project is huge and we had a scope for a beginning, an interval, and an end for both parts, so it made sense for us to release it as two parts".

In December 2020, during the making of its second installment, Neel denied rumours of a third installment in the KGF franchise, claiming that the story would conclude in its second part. However, at the end of the second film, it was hinted that the story would continue with a third part titled K.G.F: Chapter 3.

=== Casting ===
Yash grew his beard and long hair for his role as Rocky. Yash's friend Ramachandra Raju was cast as Garuda after he was spotted by Neel. In January 2017, Srinidhi Shetty was cast alongside Yash. Neel offered the role of Rocky's mother to newcomer Archana Jois, who was apprehensive at first to act as a mother despite being in her twenties but later accepted the role. In August 2017, Vasishta N. Simha was cast to play a pivotal role in the film, where he played the role of Srinidhi's fiancè. For the second part, Sanjay Dutt was roped in for a pivotal role in February 2019, marking his Kannada debut.

On 29 July 2019, Sanjay Dutt was revealed to be playing the role of the main antagonist Adheera. Raveena Tandon was reported to play the role of Prime Minister Ramika Sen, and stated that "it was a difficult character to portray".

Telugu actor Rao Ramesh was cast in a pivotal role in May 2019, and Tamil actor Saran Shakthi was cast in August 2019. On 26 August 2020, when the filming resumed, Prakash Raj was also revealed to be playing Anant Nag's son.

=== Filming ===
In July 2016, the filmmakers kick-started a 15-day schedule in North Karnataka, without Yash, as the actor was shooting for Santhu Straight Forward (2016). The first schedule of the film took place on a huge set, which took more than 35–40 days to construct. The film was slated to take off earlier that year, but was pushed back because of problems surrounding the Kalasa Banduri issue, which meant the team had to cancel its initial shoot schedule plans. The film's shooting then began on mid-January after completing the final stages of pre-production. The filmmakers erected huge sets at Badami, to recreate Kolar from the 1970–80s period, thereby filming extensively in the location. In June, the project was 50 percent complete, and production had restarted after sets were rebuilt, following their destruction by heavy rains.

Some sequences of the movie, which has Yash and Srinidhi Shetty in the lead roles, were also shot at the centenary clock tower located next to the University of Mysore campus. Yash entered the final schedule of the film in April 2018. As of May 2018, the filmmakers completed major portions of the film, except one song. On 9 August 2018, Tamannaah was hired for a song number, thus marking her second film appearance in Kannada, after Jaguar (2016). On 17 August 2018, the filmmakers announced that shooting of the film had wrapped, although another song shoot for the film's Hindi version, featuring Yash and Mouni Roy, took place at the Goregaon Studio on December.

Filming for K.G.F: Chapter 2 started on 13 March 2019 in Hyderabad, with a formal puja ceremony. After an initial round of filming near Bangalore in May 2019, Yash announced that he will join the sets only in June 2019. The shoot at Cyanide Hills in Kolar Gold Fields was interrupted by a complaint from N Srinivas, president of the KGF's National Citizens Party who filed a petition against the makers and alleged that the film is being shot in a cyanide grounds area In September 2019, the makers started shooting for the second schedule in Hyderabad where Sanjay Dutt joined the sets of the film in Hyderabad. After a court stay order on 27 September, the makers returned to shoot the film at Kolar. In October 2019, the makers returned to Karnataka, after filming the extensive schedule in Hyderabad.

In January 2020, the makers completed 80% of the shoot. With the schedule being filmed in Mysore, the last leg of shoot was expected to be held in Hyderabad, and then in Bangalore and Kolar. In February 2020, Telugu actor Rao Ramesh joined the sets of the film. Raveena Tandon joined the sets of the film in Mysore on 12 February. The makers completed major portions in March 2020, with post-production works being kickstarted, but filming came to a halt due to the COVID-19 pandemic lockdown in India. Prashanth Neel claimed that Sanjay Dutt had completed shooting for the film, with only dubbing for his portions, is pending, after Sanjay Dutt was diagnosed with lung cancer, and left US for immediate treatment on 12 August 2020.

The film was resumed in August 2020 at Bangalore post a gap of 5 months. Malavika Avinash and Prakash Raj joined the sets on this schedule. On 7 October 2020, Yash and Srinidhi Shetty resumed the shoot at Mangalore, with the team entering the final leg of shoot. Sanjay Dutt confirmed that he will join the shooting of the film on November, although he resumed the shooting only in December. The climax action scenes were filmed in December 2020 at Hyderabad.

== Cast and Crew ==
=== Cast ===
List indicators

This section includes characters who will appear or have appeared in the K.G.F franchise.

- An empty grey cell indicates the character was not in the film, or that the character's official presence has not yet been confirmed.
- ^{C} indicates a cameo role.
- ^{V} indicates a voice-only role.
- ^{Y} indicates a younger version of the character.

Character	Films	
Character	K.G.F: Chapter 1 (2018)	K.G.F: Chapter 2 (2022)
Raja Krishnappa Bairya "Rocky"	Yash	Yash
Raja Krishnappa Bairya "Rocky"	Anmol Vijay^{Y}	Anmol Vijay^{Y}
Adheera		Sanjay Dutt
Ramika Sen		Raveena Tandon
Reena Desai	Srinidhi Shetty	Srinidhi Shetty
Garuda	Ramachandra Raju	Ramachandra Raju^{C}
Kamal	Vasishta N. Simha	Vasishta N. Simha^{C}
Anand Inagalgi	Anant Nag	Anant Nag^{C}
Anand Inagalgi	Ashok Sharma^{Y}	Ashok Sharma^{Y}
Shanthamma	Archana Jois	Archana Jois
Deepa Hegde	Malavika Avinash	Malavika Avinash
Srinivas	T. S. Nagabharana	T. S. Nagabharana
Guru Pandian	Achyuth Kumar	Achyuth Kumar
Vanaram	Ayyappa P. Sharma	Ayyappa P. Sharma
Vijayendra Inagalgi		Prakash Raj
Kanneganti Raghavan		Rao Ramesh
Suryavardhan	Ramesh Indira	Ramesh Indira^{C}
Andrews	B. S. Avinash	B. S. Avinash
Daya	Tarak Ponnappa	Tarak Ponnappa
Rajendra Desai	Lakki Lakshman	Lakki Lakshman
Inayat Khalil	Balakrishna^{C}	Balakrishna

=== Crew ===
Occupation	Film	
Occupation	K.G.F: Chapter 1 (2018)	K.G.F: Chapter 2 (2022)
Director	Prashanth Neel	Prashanth Neel
Producer	Vijay Kiragandur	Vijay Kiragandur
Writer	Prashanth Neel	Prashanth Neel
Dialogues	Prashant Neel, M. Chandramouli, Dr. Suri and Vinay Shivangi	Prashant Neel, M. Chandramouli, Dr. Suri and Vinay Shivangi
Cinematography	Bhuvan Gowda	Bhuvan Gowda
Editor	Srikanth Gowda	Ujwal Kulkarni
Music	Ravi Basrur, Tanishk Bagchi (one song)	Ravi Basrur

== Reception ==
Box office

Film	Release date	Budget	Box office revenue
KGF: Chapter 1	21 December 2018	₹80 crore (US$11.7 million)	₹250 crore (US$36.56 million)
KGF: Chapter 2	14 April 2022	₹100 crore (US$10 million)	₹1,200 crore (US$120 million)–₹1,250 crore (US$130 million)
Total		₹180 crore (US$19 million)	₹1,450 crore (US$150 million)–₹1,500 crore (US$160 million)

Critical reception

Film	Rotten Tomatoes
KGF: Chapter 1	67% (5.6/10 average rating) (9 reviews)
KGF: Chapter 2	47% (5/10 average rating) (15 reviews)

== Future ==
In January 2023, Vijay Kiragandur stated in an interview that K.G.F Chapter 3 might start filming only in 2028 for a release in 2029 due to Prashanth Neel's commitments with Salaar and a film with Jr. N.T.R. Kirangandur also added "Going forward, we are going to create a Marvel kind of universe. We want to bring different characters from different movies and create something like Doctor Strange." On 14 April 2023, K.G.F Chapter 3 was confirmed with a hint video from the production company which is expected to release in 2025.

On 6 December 2023, Prashanth Neel confirmed that the script for the third installment is ready. The team is planning for KGF to go for global reach of Indian Cinema.
