= Prashanth Neel =

Indian filmmaker (born 1980)

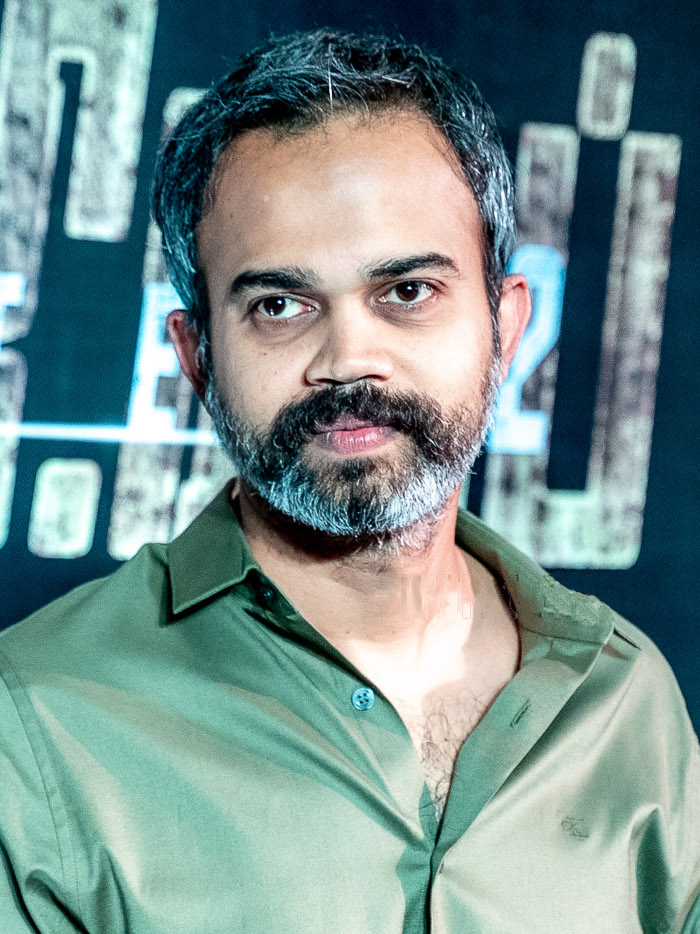
- Neel in 2022
- Born: Prashanth Neelakantapuram; 4 June 1980 (age 46); Bangalore, Karnataka, India
- Occupations: Film director; screenwriter
- Years active: 2014–present
- Spouse: Likitha Reddy (m. 2010)
- Children: 2

Prashanth Neelakantapuram (born 4 June 1980), commonly known as Prashanth Neel, is an Indian film director and screenwriter who works in Kannada and Telugu films. He debuted with the action-thriller Ugramm (2014) and later directed the KGF franchise (2018–2022), whose second part became the highest-grossing Kannada film of all-time.

Subsequently, Neel had his maiden Telugu film release with Salaar: Part 1 – Ceasefire (2023). He is the recipient of a National Film Award and a SIIMA Award.

== Personal life ==
Prashanth Neelakantapuram was born on 4 June 1980 in a Telugu family settled in Bangalore. His parents are Subhash and Bharathi, and their family hails from Neelakantapuram village, near Madakasira in Andhra Pradesh. He regularly visits his native place, Neelakantapuram, where his father's tomb is located. He shortened his eponymous surname to Neel.

Neel married Likitha in 2010. The couple has a daughter and son. Neel's sister is married to actor Sriimurali, who eventually starred in Neel's directorial debut Ugramm. Neel is a first cousin of former Andhra Pradesh state minister, Raghu Veera Reddy and is also a cousin of Telugu film actor, Aadarsh Balakrishna.

== Career ==
In an interview with a Kannada weekly magazine, Neel said he took to filmmaking initially for the need of money, following which he completed a course in the same, eventually developing interest in it. After having completed the course, he decided to cast his brother-in-law and actor Sriimurali in Aa Hudugi Neene, a screenplay that he had written during the time. After the latter expressed his concerns due to his inexperience, Neel changed his mind and began observing Srimurali's mannerisms over a period of time, and came up with the project Ugramm, an action film. The film turned out to be a massive commercial success and emerged as one of the highest-grossing Kannada films of 2014.

Reports emerged in late 2014 and early 2015 of Neel having been signed to direct three films. The first is a sequel to Ugramm, entitled Ugramm Veeram, which would feature Srimurali reprise his role from Ugramm, but due to unknown circumstances it was shelved. His next film KGF: Chapter 1 which stands for Kolar Gold Fields has Yash playing the role of Rocky, an orphan who becomes a don. The sequel KGF: Chapter 2, was scheduled for a release in July 2021, but was delayed due to the second wave of the COVID pandemic in India and was subsequently released in April 2022.

Hombale Films announced the film Salaar: Part 1 – Ceasefire starring Prabhas in December 2020. The film's shoot began in January 2021 and was released in December 2023. Mythri Movie Makers and N. T. R. Arts have announced a film in collaboration with Neel and N. T. Rama Rao Jr in May 2021. The film was officially began in August 2024, with title reported as Dragon. Salaar: Part 2 – Shouryanga Parvam has subsequently commenced shooting in October 2024.

== Filmography ==
Key
†	Denotes films that have not yet been released

List of Prashanth Neel film credits
Year	Title	Credited as		Language	Notes	Ref.
Year	Title	Director	Writer	Language	Notes	Ref.
2014	Ugramm	Yes	Yes	Kannada		
2014	Gargar Mandala	No	No	Kannada	Distribution only	
2018	KGF: Chapter 1	Yes	Yes	Kannada		
2022	KGF: Chapter 2	Yes	Yes	Kannada		
2023	Salaar: Part 1 – Ceasefire	Yes	Yes	Telugu		
2024	Bagheera	No	Yes	Kannada		
2026	418	No	No	Telugu	Presenter only	
2027	Dragon †	Yes	Yes	Telugu		
TBA	Salaar: Part 2 – Shouryaanga Parvam †	Yes	Yes	Telugu		

== Awards and nominations ==
List of Prashanth Neel awards and nominations
Year	Award	Category	Work	Result	Ref(s)
2015	62nd Filmfare Awards South	Best Director – Kannada	Ugramm	Nominated	
2015	4th South Indian International Movie Awards	Best Debut Director – Kannada	Ugramm	Won	
2019	8th South Indian International Movie Awards	Best Director – Kannada	KGF: Chapter 1	Won	
2019	66th Filmfare Awards South	Best Director – Kannada	KGF: Chapter 1	Nominated	
2019	Zee Kannada Hemmeya Kannadiga Awards	Best Director	KGF: Chapter 1	Won	
2022	11th South Indian International Movie Awards	Best Director – Kannada	KGF: Chapter 2	Nominated	
2024	70th National Film Awards	Best Feature Film in Kannada	KGF: Chapter 2	Won	
2024	68th Filmfare Awards South	Best Director – Kannada	KGF: Chapter 2	Nominated	
2024	69th Filmfare Awards South	Best Director – Telugu	Salaar: Part 1 – Ceasefire	Nominated	
2024	3rd IIFA Utsavam	Best Director – Telugu	Salaar: Part 1 – Ceasefire	Nominated	
