= KGF: Chapter 2 =

2022 Indian film by Prashanth Neel

- Theatrical release poster
- Directed by: Prashanth Neel
- Written by: Prasanth Neel
- Dialogues by: Prasanth Neel; M. Chandramoli; Dr. Suri
- Produced by: Vijay Kiragandur
- Starring: Yash; Sanjay Dutt; Raveena Tandon; Srinidhi Shetty; Prakash Raj; Archana Jois; Achyuth Kumar; Vasishta N. Simha; Rao Ramesh; T. S. Nagabharana; Malavika Avinash
- Narrated by: Prakash Raj
- Cinematography: Bhuvan Gowda
- Edited by: Ujwal Kulkarni
- Music by: Ravi Basrur
- Production company: Hombale Films
- Distributed by: see below
- Release date: 14 April 2022
- Running time: 168 minutes
- Country: India
- Language: Kannada
- Budget: ₹100 crore
- Box office: ₹1200–1250 crore (Note: The New Indian Express and DNA India reported the worldwide collection to be around ₹1,200 crore to ₹1,216 crore, and The Hindustan Times mentioned the collection as ₹1,207 crore. News 18 and India Today mentioned that the collection was ₹1,240 crore. The Times Of India, Vijaya Karnataka, TV9 Kannada and Asianet News reported that the movie grossed ₹1250 crores. News 18 reported a gross of ₹1500 crores.)

KGF: Chapter 2 is a 2022 Indian Kannada-language period action film written and directed by Prashanth Neel, and produced by Vijay Kiragandur under his Hombale Films banner. It serves as the direct sequel to KGF: Chapter 1 (2018), as well as the second installment in the KGF franchise. The film stars an ensemble cast of Yash, Sanjay Dutt, Raveena Tandon, Srinidhi Shetty, Prakash Raj, Achyuth Kumar, Rao Ramesh, Vasishta N. Simha, Ayyappa P. Sharma, Archana Jois, Saran Shakti, Easwari Rao, John Kokken, T. S. Nagabharana and Malavika Avinash.

Produced on a budget of ₹100 crore, KGF: Chapter 2 was at the time of release the most expensive Kannada film ever made. Neel retained most of the technicians from its predecessor with Bhuvan Gowda handling the cinematography and Ravi Basrur composing the film's score and songs. Dutt and Tandon joined the cast in early 2019, marking the former's Kannada film debut. Portions of the film were shot simultaneously with Chapter 1. Principal photography for the rest of the film commenced in March 2019, but was halted in March 2020 owing to the COVID-19 lockdown in India. Filming resumed five months later in August 2020 and was completed in December 2020. Locations included Bangalore, Hyderabad, Mysore and Kolar.

KGF: Chapter 2 was theatrically released in India on 14 April 2022 in Kannada, along with dubbed versions in Telugu, Tamil, Malayalam and Hindi languages. It is also the first Kannada film to release in IMAX. The film received critical acclaim for its acting, action sequences, direction, and story and emotional weight and became one of the greatest and most popular films from Kannada Cinema. It recorded the fourth highest-opening day in India, set domestic opening day records in Kannada, Telugu, Tamil, Hindi and Malayalam, and surpassed the lifetime gross of its predecessor in two days to become the highest-grossing Kannada film. With earnings of ₹1,200−1,250 crore globally, KGF: Chapter 2 is the second highest grossing Indian film of 2022 worldwide, highest grossing film of 2022 in India, eighth highest-grossing Indian film worldwide, and the fifth highest-grossing film in India.

== Plot ==
After recounting the events of K.G.F., Anand Ingalagi suffers a stroke, prompting his son Vijayendra Ingalagi to continue narrating the story.

Following Garuda's assassination, Rocky kills the heir apparent Virat and seizes control of the Kolar Gold Fields (K.G.F.) in Karnataka. To secure the loyalty of Guru Pandian, Andrews, Kamal, and Rajendra Desai, he keeps Reena, his love interest and Desai's daughter, hostage. However, Rocky's growing arrogance and his taunting behaviour toward Reena provoke Kamal, who openly threatens him. In response, Rocky shoots Kamal dead on the spot, further cementing his dominance. He subsequently orders mining operations to begin in eight hidden mines, while the captured Vanaram ultimately pledges his allegiance to Rocky.

Meanwhile, Adheera resurfaces and massacres the guards stationed at a remote outpost, signaling his return. In an attempt to lure Rocky into a confrontation, Andrews orchestrates Desai's murder and manipulates events to draw Reena out of K.G.F., after which she is abducted by John, Adheera's henchman, on his orders. During the rescue attempt, Adheera shoots Rocky but deliberately spares his life while simultaneously blockading all gold exports from K.G.F. Elsewhere, Shetty allies himself with Andrews' remaining associates along India's western coast and, with the support of Inayat Khalil, systematically eliminates Rocky's allies. Anticipating further attacks, Rocky evacuates the mansion alongside Reena, taking with him vast reserves of gold and cash from the treasury. Amid the resulting unrest within K.G.F., Vanaram deduces that Rocky is heading toward a strategic choke point.

While recovering from his injuries, Rocky travels to Dubai to negotiate directly with Khalil. Simultaneously, his men assassinate Khalil's associates across India, enabling Rocky to reclaim control of the western coastline and force Khalil into a business alliance. Rocky also acquires powerful Kalashnikov rifle, which he later uses to launch a devastating assault on Adheera's blockade, killing his men and gravely injuring Adheera. Frustrated by the unchecked power of K.G.F., several central ministers attempt to bring down the DYSS-backed government through a no-confidence motion in order to elevate Ramika Sen to power. However, Rocky's henchmen intimidate the ministers into withdrawing their support, causing the motion to fail. Rocky subsequently kills Shetty and consolidates his control over Bombay's underworld. Although Guru Pandian warns him about Ramika Sen's rapidly growing political influence, Rocky dismisses the threat.

In 1981, Ramika Sen wins the Indian general election and becomes Prime Minister. After receiving a detailed briefing on K.G.F. from CBI officer Kanneganti Raghavan, she authorizes raids on Rocky's warehouses. During this period, a young Anand Ingalagi is caught spying by Rocky's men, but Rocky is impressed by the boy's honesty and determination. The CBI raids yield almost nothing except a single 400-gram gold bar. Rocky later storms the police station where the bar is stored and destroys the entire building single-handedly using a DShk machine gun.

Rocky subsequently halts all gold exports from K.G.F., straining his relationship with Khalil while continuing large-scale mining operations. Around the same time, his aides locate his biological father, an alcoholic who had abandoned the family years earlier, and unknowingly pay him to tend to Shanti's relocated grave. Reena gradually falls in love with Rocky, confesses her feelings, and eventually marries him. Rocky later meets Ramika Sen personally and presents her with documents exposing his own involvement in extensive money laundering operations. However, Sen is unable to act upon the evidence, as many members of her own party are implicated in the corruption.

Still consumed by vengeance, Adheera infiltrates K.G.F. through a secret passage with the help of Andrews, Daya, and John, backed by Khalil's armed fleet. Just as Reena reveals to Rocky that she is pregnant, Adheera fatally shoots her. In the violent confrontation that follows, Rocky's forces kill Andrews and Daya, while Rocky personally kills John before strangling Adheera to death.

Enraged by Reena's death, Rocky and his men storm the Parliament of India during Ramika Sen's address and assassinate Guru Pandian, whose betrayals are revealed to have shaped many of the conflict's major events. Pandian had orchestrated the original attack on Garuda for which Adheera was blamed, secretly informed Adheera about Garuda's retaliation, revealed the hidden passage into K.G.F., encouraged Andrews to recruit Rocky, manipulated the no-confidence motion in Delhi, and persuaded Shetty to ally himself with Khalil.

In response to Rocky's violent actions, Ramika Sen signs a death warrant against him and deploys the Indian Army. Rocky evacuates K.G.F. and departs by ship with an enormous cache of gold, but not before establishing a new colony for the liberated workers of K.G.F. He deliberately reveals his location to the Indian, American, and Indonesian navies, refusing all demands for surrender. Acting on Sen's orders, the military launches an assault on both K.G.F. and Rocky's vessel. Rocky ultimately sinks into the ocean along with the gold, which remains lost in the present day. Inspired by Rocky's extraordinary life and legacy, the young Anand Ingalagi resolves to write a book chronicling his story.

In a mid-credits scene set three months before Rocky's death, CIA agent John Booker delivers Ramika Sen a classified file detailing Rocky's criminal activities across the United States and sixteen other countries between 1978 and 1981. In the present day, a peon working at the television channel discovers the final manuscript of K.G.F: Chapter 3, implying that Rocky's story may not yet be over.

== Cast ==
- Yash as Raja Krishnappa Bairya "Rocky"
  - Anmol Vijay as young Rocky
- Sanjay Dutt as Adheera, Suryavardhan's younger brother
- Raveena Tandon as Ramika Sen, Prime Minister of India
- Srinidhi Shetty as Reena Desai, Rocky's wife
- Achyuth Kumar as Guru Pandian, DYSS Party head
- Prakash Raj as Vijayendra Ingalagi, Anand Ingalagi's son
- Vasishta N. Simha as Kamal
- Rao Ramesh as Kanneganti Raghavan, a CBI officer
- Malavika Avinash as Deepa Hegde, the Chief Editor of 24/news channel
- T. S. Nagabharana as Srinivas, news channel owner
- Easwari Rao as Fathima, Farmaan's mother
- Archana Jois as Shanthamma, Rocky's mother
- B. S. Avinash as Andrews
- Saran Shakthi as Farmaan, Rocky's loyal henchman
- Lakki Lakshman as Rajendra Desai, Reena's father
- Ayyappa P. Sharma as Vanaram
- Anant Nag as Anand Ingalagi
  - Ashok Sharma as young Anand Ingalagi
- John Kokken as John, overseer of K.G.F
- Govinde Gowda as a peon at 24/News
- Harish Rai as Khasim, Rocky's confidant
- Tarak Ponnappa as Daya, Andrews' secretary
- Dinesh Mangaluru as Shetty
- Balakrishna as Inayat Khalil, a Dubai based don
- Appaji Ambarisha Darbha as Speaker of the Indian Parliament
- Ramesh Indira as Suryavardhan, the founder of the K.G.F's political cult and father of Garuda and Virat (archival footage)
- Ramachandra Raju as Garuda, Suryavardhan's son (archival footage)
- Vinay Bidappa as Virat, Garuda's younger brother
- B. Suresha as Vittal, a slave at K.G.F (archival footage)
- Mohan Juneja as Nagaraju, an informer to Anand Ingalagi
- Roopa Rayappa as Shanthi, a worker at K.G.F
- Krishnappa as Krishnappa Bairya, Rocky's father
- Srinivas Murthy as Narayan, a worker at KGF
- Krishnoji Rao as an old blind man working in KGF
- Yash Shetty as Shyam, archaeological department officer, who along with his team finds the stone of Rocky
- Divya G Gowda as Reena's aide

== Production ==
=== Development ===
Prashanth Neel worked on the film's screenplay after the release of Ugramm (2014), and development of the film began in early 2015. However, he decided to split the film in two parts, as the narration of this story is in a non-linear format, and the decision was also made with the commercial prospects in mind. In an interview with The Times of India in October 2018, he added, "The scale of the project is huge and we had a scope for a beginning, an interval and an end for both parts, so it made sense for us to release it as two parts". As for the decision to make it multilingual, he says that it was because the film is based on a unique idea and has a universal theme. In December 2020, Prashanth Neel said that there were no plans for a third instalment in the K.G.F franchise.

Prashanth Neel decided to rope in composer Ravi Basrur and cinematographer Bhuvan Gowda as a part of the technical crew for the second part of the film.

=== Casting ===
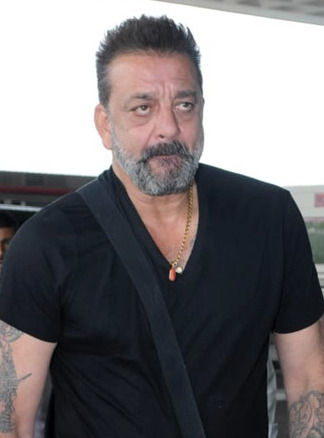
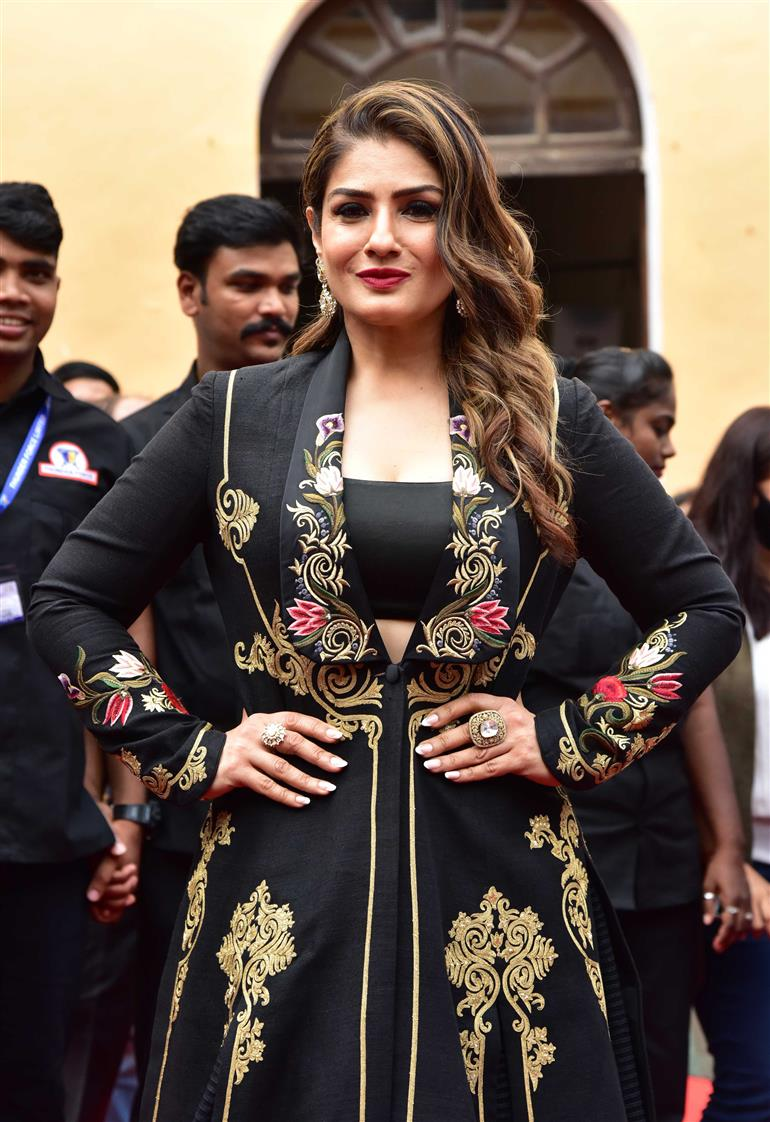
Sanjay Dutt (top), Raveena Tandon (middle). Sanjay Dutt and Raveena Tandon made their debut in Kannada cinema through the film.

"Adheera is one of the greatest characters I have played. He's a powerful villain — mentally and physically. He is almost like a viking. To ensure that I could do justice to his larger-than-life presence, I trained hard to get the physicality fit. Along with that, I mentally trained hard as well, so that I could be the greatest force to take on Yash's Rocky. Even for my role in Agneepath, I didn't wear the bald cap or use prosthetics but completely shaved off my head. And the result has been there for everyone to see."

— Sanjay Dutt about his role in K.G.F: Chapter 2.

While Yash, Srinidhi Shetty, Vasishta N. Simha, Achyuth Kumar, Malavika Avinash, T.S Nagabharana and other remaining actors from the first part have reprised their respective roles, Sanjay Dutt was roped in for a pivotal role in February 2019. Media rumours that Raveena Tandon would appear in the film started making rounds as early as February 2019. A news report in The Times of India confirmed that Tandon will be seen in a "major role" in the film. Despite Srinidhi becoming a breakout star, post the release of the predecessor, she rejected seven films, in order to start shoot for the film. The makers hosted an audition in April 2019, for aspiring actors who want to become a part of the film's cast.

On 29 July 2019, Sanjay Dutt was revealed to be playing the role of the main antagonist Adheera, marking his Kannada debut. He compared his character to Thanos, and revealed that his role was "shown to be a dangerous character with scary makeup" and added that it was a role he was looking for. Raveena Tandon was reported to play the role of Prime Minister Ramika Sen, and stated that "it was a difficult character to portray".

Telugu actor Rao Ramesh was cast in a pivotal role in May 2019, and Tamil actor Saran Shakthi was cast in August 2019. On 26 August 2020, when the filming resumed, Prakash Raj was also revealed to be playing an important character.

=== Filming ===
Before the release of the first part in December 2018, the makers shot 20% of the second part, and the crew went on double shifts until January 2019. On 4 January, it was announced that they have completed 15% of the shooting for the film, and planned to resume the shooting of the film in the summer of 2019.

Filming for KGF: Chapter 2 started on 13 March 2019 in Hyderabad, with a formal puja ceremony. After an initial round of filming near Bangalore in May 2019, Yash announced that he will join the sets only in June 2019. The film's shooting started on 4 June at the Lalita Mahal Palace in Mysore, although Yash joined the sets on 6 June. Later the shoot commenced in August 2019 at Cyanide Hills in Kolar Gold Fields. On 28 August 2019, N Srinivas, president of the KGF's National Citizens Party filed a petition against the makers and alleged that the film is being shot in the protected area of cyanide mound and is damaging the nature. The JMFC court has issued an injunction notice to the producer Kiragandur, also ordering to stall the shoot. On 4 September, the producers claimed that the stay order was issued a day before the makers planned to wrap the shoot schedule. The same day, the makers started shooting for the second schedule in Hyderabad. On 25 September 2019, Sanjay Dutt joined the sets of the film in Hyderabad. After winning the court stay order on 27 September, the makers returned to shoot the film at Cyanide Hills. On 14 October 2019, the makers returned to Karnataka, after filming the extensive schedule in Hyderabad.

As of 27 January 2020, the makers completed 80% of the shoot. With the schedule being filmed in Mysore, the last leg of shoot was expected to be held in Hyderabad, and then in Bangalore and Kolar. On 3 February 2020, behind-the-scenes video of Yash shooting at the Infosys campus in Mysore went viral. On 10 February, Telugu actor Rao Ramesh joined the sets of the film. Raveena Tandon joined the sets of the film in Mysore on 12 February. After the second schedule of the film held in Mysore got completed, the makers headed to Hyderabad on 21 February. Raveena completed her portions on 28 February. The makers completed major portions in March 2020, with post-production works being kickstarted, but filming came to a halt due to the COVID-19 pandemic lockdown in India. Prashanth Neel claimed that Sanjay Dutt had almost completed shooting for the film, and he has pending dubbing work for his role. after Sanjay Dutt was diagnosed with lung cancer and had left for the US for immediate treatment on 12 August 2020.

Flming resumed on 26 August 2020 at Bangalore after 5 months. Malavika Avinash and Prakash Raj joined the sets on this schedule. On 7 October 2020, Yash and Srinidhi Shetty resumed the shoot at Mangalore, with the team entering the final leg of shoot. Sanjay Dutt confirmed that he will join the shooting of the film on November, although he resumed the shooting only in December. The climax action scenes were filmed in December 2020 at Hyderabad, which were choreographed by action director Anbariv. On 20 December 2020, the makers announced that the climax scene of the film was completed. KGF: Chapter 2 was produced on a budget of ₹125 crore, and is the most expensive Kannada film.

== Music ==
The film's music is composed by Ravi Basrur. The music rights are owned by Lahari Music and T-Series for south languages. The music rights of Hindi version was bought by MRT Music. Music sessions of the film began in April 2019, at Basrur's newly renovated recording studio in Bangalore. However, music production was disrupted in mid-March 2020 due to the COVID-19 pandemic, which was resumed during that May. After work on the film's music and score being completed, Basrur later edited the score and songs, during mid-2021. The Naik Brothers (Laxman and Sandesh Datta), recorded two songs "Toofan" and "Sultan", used in the Hindi-dubbed version of the film. They stated "We went there and he dubbed four songs in Telugu and Kannada in our voice. Later, COVID-19 lockdown happened. After a long wait of two years, they recorded two songs for the Hindi dubbed version titled Toofan and Sultan and finalised for the movie". The audio rights for K.G.F: Chapter 2 were bought by Lahari Music and T-Series for ₹7.2 crore (US$770,000). On 21 March 2022, the first single titled "Toofan" was released from the album. The song depicts the rise of Rocky (Yash) as a saviour of enslaved people in the gold mines of Kolar, as depicted in the predecessor's plot. It crossed over 26 million views within 24 hours of its release. On 6 April 2022, the second single titled "Gagana Nee" was released, On 13 April 2022, the third single titled "Sulthana" was released. On 14 April 2022, the fourth single titled "Mehabooba" was released. On 16 April 2022, the makers released the soundtrack album, containing four songs. On 24 April 2022, the fifth single titled "The Monster Song" was also released.

== Marketing ==
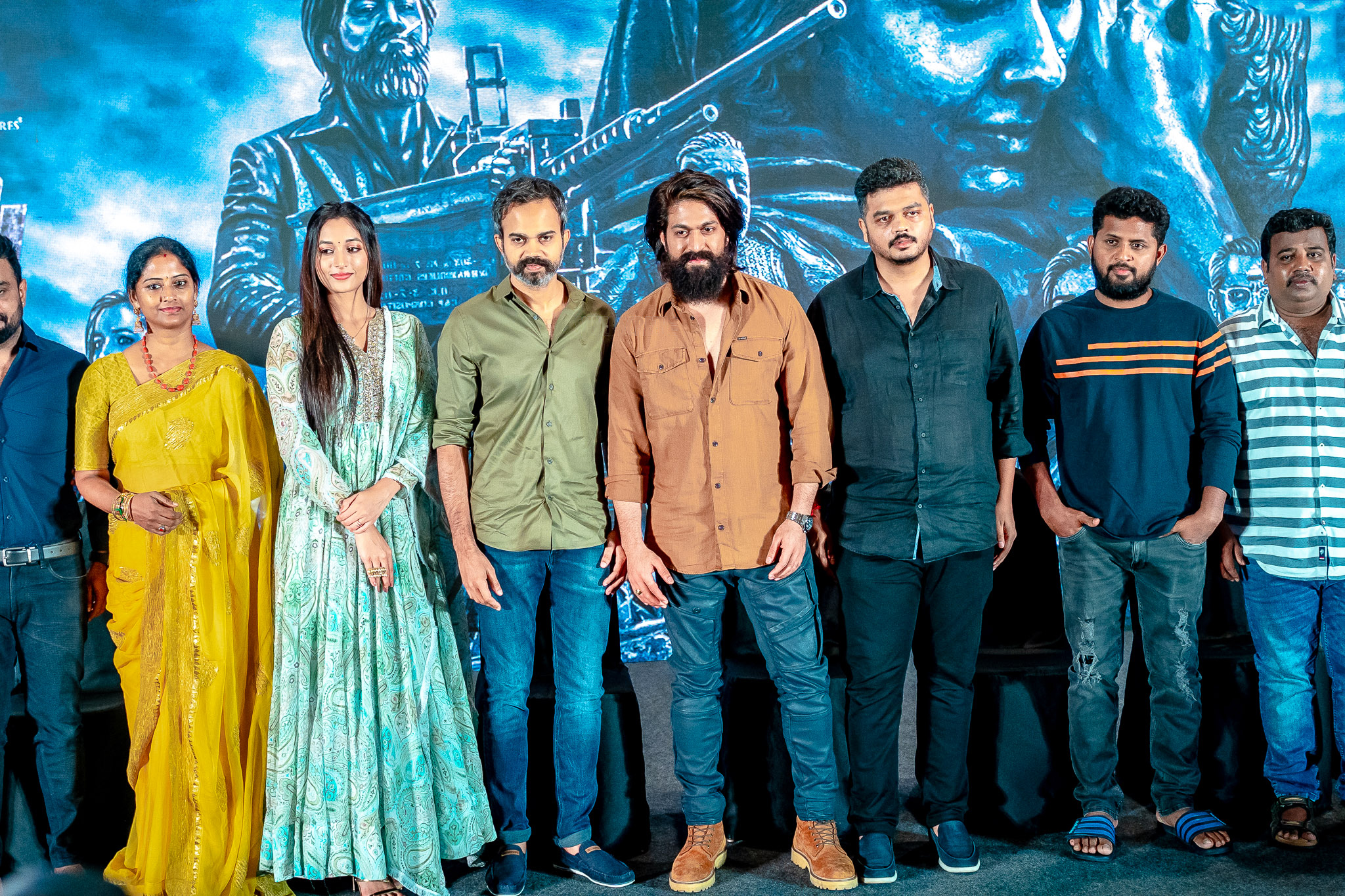
The cast and crew at a KGF: Chapter 2 promotional event in Chennai in April 2022

As a part of the promotional activities, a fictional newspaper named KGF Times was designed based on vintage newspapers. Starting from 4 to 10 January 2021, the makers unveiled the new editions of the film through their social media accounts.

The teaser was initially scheduled to release on 8 January 2021, coinciding with Yash's birthday. However, after a few cuts from the teaser leaked through the internet, the makers unveiled the teaser on 7 January, ahead of the official launch. Instead of releasing the teaser in five languages, the makers released it as a single teaser featuring English dialogues. It became the most viewed and most liked teaser, having 278 million views as of September 2025 and surpassing Avengers: Infinity War likes. The official trailer of the film was released on 27 March 2022 and became the most watched Indian trailer in 24 hours with 109 million views across five languages. The film even surpassed Avengers: Endgame views. The film trailer was showcased on the Burj Khalifa. The North America promo was promoted on Harmon Corner in Las Vegas. KGF: Chapter 2 was the first film ever to premiere with sports league. The film was advertised by IPL team Royal Challengers Bengaluru, and Football leagues Manchester United and La Liga.

== Release ==
=== Theatrical ===
K.G.F: Chapter 2 was originally scheduled to release in theatres on 23 October 2020, coinciding with Dussehra festival. However, the release was postponed due to the COVID-19 pandemic in India. In January 2021, the filmmakers announced that it will be released theatrically on 16 July 2021. However, it was postponed again for the same reason. The Karnataka State Anti-Tobacco Cell sent a notice to actor Yash, producer Vijay Kiragandur and filmmaker Prashanth Neel on 11 January 2021 as the makers failed to display the anti-smoking warning message, particularly in the sequences that involve Yash smoking. As per the law, anti-smoking warnings have to be displayed to stop fans from emulating it. On 22 August 2021, the new release date was announced as 14 April 2022. Finally it was released on 14 April 2022 in Kannada and dubbed versions of Telugu, Hindi, Tamil and Malayalam languages. It became the first Kannada movie to release in Greece. It was also the first Kannada film to release in IMAX. It is also the first Kannada film to release in South Korea. It was also the first commercial Kannada movie to release in Pakistan. On July 14, 2023, both KGF 1 and 2 released in Japan, even in Japanese dub.

=== Screening ===
The film was reported to release in more than 10,000 screens worldwide. In India, the film was released in over 6000 screens.

=== Distribution ===
Hombale Films distributed the film in Karnataka. The Kerala distribution rights was brought by Prithviraj under the banner Prithviraj Productions. Dream Warrior Pictures acquired the Tamil Nadu distribution rights, while Andhra Pradesh and Telangana distribution rights were bagged by Varahi Chalana Chitram.

Anil Thadani, Farhan Akhtar and Ritesh Sidhwani acquired the distribution rights for the film's Hindi version under the banner AA Films and Excel Entertainment respectively.

The film was distributed in North America by Sarigama Cinemas. The Europe distribution was done through 4Seasons Creations Cinestaan AA distributed the film in Hindi language across various overseas nations. The United Kingdom distribution was done through Boleyn Cinemas. Radha Krishna Entertainments distributed the film in Australia, New Zealand, Fiji and Papua New Guinea. The film was also distributed in Malaysia, Singapore, GCC regions and African nations.

=== Home media ===
The film's digital streaming rights are sold to Amazon Prime Video for all five languages. On 16 May 2022, Amazon Prime Video announced that the film was available for early access rental in all five languages at ₹199 for both Prime and non-Prime customers in India. The film officially became available for streaming worldwide on Amazon Prime Video on 3 June 2022 in its original Kannada language and in the Hindi, Tamil, Telugu and Malayalam languages.

== Reception ==
On the review aggregator website Rotten Tomatoes, 47% of 15 critics' reviews are positive, with an average rating of 5/10.

Taran Adarsh of Bollywood Hungama gave the film four and a half stars out of five and was appreciative of all major aspects of production, opining that it "has a fresh, international look and doesn't look like a regional film at all." Subha J. Rao of Firstpost gave the film four stars out of five and found the writing and conception to be "far better" than Chapter 1. Sunayana Suresh of The Times of India also gave it four stars out of five and similarly said that "Neel and Yash have managed to deliver a sequel that seems more immersive than the first part." Vivek MV of Deccan Herald rated the film three and a half stars out of five, as did Janani K of India Today, who described the climax as "cathartic and brilliantly shot" but was critical of the uneven pacing throughout. With three stars out of five, Shuklaji of The News Minute wrote, "Despite the few shortcomings, viewers are bound to recall the film forever for its outrageous imagination and incredible technical finesse."

Bharathi Pradhan of Lehren gave the film two out of five stars and stated that Rocky was "Don Of Indian Dystopia". Rohit Bhatnagar of The Free Press Journal rated the film two and a half stars out of five and wrote "KGF: Chapter 2 has every possible ingredient to impress the janta, but finding realism is a big no-no". Sukanya Verma of Rediff.com gave the film two and a half stars out of five and observed, "Testosterone, not rationale, is the driving force behind the K.G.F franchise," but praised the performances for putting "some muscle on a thin premise," and the production design. Shubhra Gupta of The Indian Express gave one and a half stars out of five and was not impressed with the screenplay or momentum, writing that the film "swings haphazardly between the past and the present." With two and a half stars out of five, Nandini Ramnath of Scroll.in gave the film two and a half stars out of five and found the film to be "less chaotic" than Chapter 1, but felt it "continues to suffer from leaps in the time-space continuum." Saibal Chatterjee of NDTV rated it two stars out of five and wrote, "The film is the handiwork of people who do not seem to have the foggiest sense of modulation, or of moderation, in the matter of pitching and sound design," but was appreciative of Yash's performance.

Writing for News18, Sonil Dedhia called K.G.F: Chapter 2 an "all-stops pulled out entertainment" film and opined that it "delivers the goods when it comes to non-stop thrills, mood, and style." Monika Rawal Kukreja of Hindustan Times felt the film was "worth the hype and one of the finest sequels to have come out in a long time," and described Yash as "just unmissable." Srivatsan S. of The Hindu labelled the film a "festival of male toxicity" but felt Neel had corrected "some of the wrongs of the first part," writing, "There is only one way to look at K.G.F: Chapter 2 for it to work for you and that is to partake in the madness it offers."

== Box office ==
KGF: Chapter 2 collected ₹164 crore (US$18 million) worldwide on the first day of its release. On its second day, the film collected ₹122 crore (US$13 million) worldwide for a two-day total of ₹286 crore (US$31 million), surpassing K.G.F: Chapter 1's lifetime gross of ₹250 crore (US$36.56 million), and took its place as the highest-grossing Kannada film of all time. On its third day, the film estimatedly collected ₹104 crore (US$11 million) worldwide for a three-day total of ₹390 crore (US$42 million). On the fourth day of its release, the film crossed ₹552.85 crore (US$59 million) mark at the worldwide box office. On the fifth day of its release, the film grossed more than ₹625 crore (US$67 million) worldwide. Collections on the sixth day stood at ₹675 crore (US$72 million). The first week collection of the film was ₹719 crore (US$77 million). The movie grossed ₹1,006 crore (US$110 million) in 14 days and became the 4th Indian movie to cross the 1000 crore mark worldwide and the second fastest movie to collect ₹1000 crore, behind Baahubali 2: The Conclusion. While Firstpost reported that the movie grossed 1100 crores, While The New Indian Express and DNA India reported that the worldwide collection to be around ₹1,200 crore to ₹1,216 crore, The Hindustan Times mentioned the collection as ₹1,207 crore. News 18, and TV9 Marathi reported the collection to be ₹1,240 crore. The Times Of India, Vijaya Karnataka, TV9 Kannada and Asianet News reported that the movie grossed ₹1250 crores. India Today reported the collections to be ₹1300 crore. It became the fourth highest-grossing Indian film of all time.

=== India ===
On the first day of release, KGF: Chapter 2 collected ₹134.5 crore (US$14 million) at the box office, the second-highest opening day in India after RRR. The Hindi version raked in ₹53.95 crore (US$5.8 million) at the box office on the first day, making it the highest-opening day collection for a film in Hindi, which is also higher than what any Indian film collected on the first day excluding south India. The film recorded the highest-ever opening day for a Kannada film in Karnataka. It also set opening day records in Malayalam (Kerala) by grossing ₹7.2 crores.

The Hindi version raked ₹219.56 crore (US$23 million) at the box office on the fifth day of its release. On the fifth day of its release, the Tamil version raked in around 62 lakhs in Chennai alone surpassing the collections of the Tamil film Beast. The Hindi version managed to cross ₹250 crore (US$27 million) in 7 days making it the fastest one to do so and broke the previous record held by Baahubali 2: The Conclusion (8 days). The Hindi version collected ₹322 crore (US$34 million) in 12 days and became the 10th entrant in the ₹300 crore club in Hindi-language. The film grossed ₹806.1 crore (US$86 million) in India in 15 days run and become third highest-grossing film in India. The Hindi version earned ₹353.06 crore (US$38 million) in 16 days and became the third highest grossing film in Hindi language. The film grossed ₹100 crores in Tamil Nadu, making it the first Kannada and the second non-Tamil film to do so. With a gross collection of ₹ 22.06 crores, it became the second movie to cross the ₹20 crore mark in West Bengal. It became the first film to gross more than ₹10 crore in Odisha and the fastest to reach the ₹50 crore mark in Kerala. In home territory Karnataka it has collected over ₹175 crore (US$19 million) in just 25 days of its release.

The Hindi version netted more than ₹421.88 crore (US$45 million) breaking the record of Dangal (₹387.38 crore) and climbed to the second position behind Baahubali 2: The Conclusion (₹511 crore). With domestic collections of ₹1000 crores, the film became the second highest grossing film in India. The Hindi version managed to cross the net collection mark of ₹400 crore (US$43 million) - making it the second movie to do so after Baahubali 2: The Conclusion. The film collected ₹1,000 crore (US$110 million) at the Indian box-office in 33 days and became the second highest-grossing film in India as well as the second Indian movie to gross ₹1000 crore at the domestic market. The gross domestic collection was reported to be ₹1008 crore. It became the first-ever to gross ₹10 crore in Odisha (beating all Odia films) and the fastest to reach the ₹50-crore mark in Kerala. In addition, it has also earned over ₹100 crore each in the Tamil Nadu and Mumbai circuits.

=== Other territories ===
The film debuted at the North American box office by collected more than $1 million from the premiere shows. It collected $225,892 from 80 locations in Australia and a further $39,372 from 26 locations in New Zealand on the first day. In the opening weekend, it collected $26,225,842 from 510 screens, while the Hindi version collected $930,527 from 268 screens in the United States of America. In Canada, it collected $1,117,124 from 55 screens. It grossed £598,000 (US$819,178.08) in the United Kingdom from 182 screens. In other countries, it collected ₹19.53 crore (US$2.1 million) in the opening weekend. It became the first Kannada film to be screened in South Korea and the longest running Kannada film in Canada. It was also the first film to release in multiple languages simultaneously in Canada. In November 2022, News 18 reported the worldwide gross theatrical collections to be ₹1500 crores.

== Accolades ==
Year	Ceremony	Category	Recipient(s)	Result	Ref.
2024	National Film Awards	Best Film – Kannada	Prashanth Neel	Won	
2024	National Film Awards	Best Stunt Choreography	Anbariv	Won	

== Future ==
The film's post-credits scene showcased the final draft of KGF: Chapter 3, hinting at a sequel. In April 2022, Neel said: "If people love KGF: Chapter 2, we could think of continuing the franchise." The same month, executive producer Karthik Gowda confirmed that a sequel was in development and pre-production had begun. In an interview with Variety, Yash stated that he and Neel had conceptualised some scenes for the sequel.

In May 2022, producer Vijay Kiragandur stated they were planning to begin the sequel's production after October 2022, aiming for a 2024 release. "Going forward, we are going to create a Marvel kind of universe. We want to bring different characters from different movies and create something like Doctor Strange," Kiragandur added. However, executive producer Karthik Gowda called it a speculation, tweeting: "Hombale Films will not be starting KGF 3 anytime soon." In June 2022, Neel asserted the possibility of Chapter 3, stating: "We just want to take a big break and we will definitely come back to make that." In October 2024, Yash confirmed that KGF 3 is in the works, stating that he and director Prasanth Neel are actively discussing the project.
