= Ugramm =

2014 Kannada film by Prashanth Neel

- Theatrical release poster
- Directed by: Prashanth Neel
- Written by: Prashanth Neel; K. Ram ShriLaxman
- Produced by: Pradeep Neel
- Starring: Sriimurali; Tilak; Hariprriya
- Cinematography: Bhuvan Gowda; Ravi Varman; Ravi Kumar Sana
- Edited by: Srikanth
- Music by: Ravi Basrur
- Production company: Inkfinite Pictures
- Distributed by: Thoogudeepa Distributors
- Release date: 21 February 2014
- Running time: 141 minutes
- Country: India
- Language: Kannada

Ugramm (transl. Anger) is a 2014 Indian Kannada-language action thriller film directed by Prashanth Neel in his directorial debut, and produced by his brother Pradeep Neel. It stars Sriimurali and Hariprriya in the lead roles, with Tilak Shekar, Avinash, Atul Kulkarni, and Jai Jagadish in supporting roles. The music was composed by Ravi Basrur. Bhuvan Gowda serves as the main cinematographer with Ravi Varman as a guest cinematographer, marking his debut in Kannada cinema.

Ugramm completed a run of 125 days in select theatres in Karnataka. A sequel titled Ugramm Veeram was announced by Sriimurali in July 2014, but was later shelved. The film was remade in Odia as Agastya (2016) and in Marathi as Raanti (2024). Its storyline was later adapted into Salaar: Part 1 – Ceasefire by Prashanth Neel, though it was not a direct remake.

== Plot ==
1994: Shivarudra Lingaiah, a ruthless gangster running a crime syndicate in Bangalore, agrees to take up a big smuggling deal and approaches Prabhakar, the owner of a shipping company, to smuggle the goods through his ships, but Prabhakar rejects the offer. Enraged by the rejection, Shivarudra Lingaiah kills Prabhakar's wife and threatens to kill his infant daughter Nithya. As a result, Prabhakar accepts Shivarudra Lingaiah's offer.

While working with Shivarudra Lingaiah, Prabhakar stops a ship coming from Dubai, which contains smuggled goods belonging to Shivarudra Lingaiah. Prabhakar loads 90% of the smuggled goods onto another ship and sells it to a third party. Afterwards, Prabhakar escapes to Australia, along with Nithya, to start a new life. Shivarudra Lingaiah gets arrested based on a tip-off by Prabhakar. However, Shivarudra Lingaiah continues his activities from the prison through his son Dheeraj.

2014: Shivarudra Lingaiah is now an MLA candidate, who along with Dheeraj, is waiting to exact vengeance from Prabhakar. A grown-up Nithya arrives in Bangalore to visit her late mother's grave in Talagavara. Nithya is kidnapped by Dheeraj's gang on the way, but she is rescued by Agastya, an automobile mechanic. Agastya takes her to his house for safeguarding as advised by Prabhakar's family-friend Vishwa.

Meanwhile, a cat-and-mouse game ensues between Shivarudra Lingaiah and Agastya, where Agastya manages to save Nithya again. Nithya, who has fallen for Agastya, learns from Vishwa about his dark past in Mughor, a region ruled by a blood-thirsty syndicate. Agastya's old promise to his friend Bala had pushed Agastya to enter the crime syndicate. Within just a few years, Agastya managed to capture the entire region for Bala, against all odds. This earned him fearful respect and notoriety. However, Agastya's skirmish with Bala's younger brother Maara led to Maara's death. Agastya had exiled himself, respecting his mother's vow to live a life free of violence.

Dheeraj kills Shivarudra Lingaiah, deeming him weak, and captures Nithya and relocates to Mughor, under orders from Mughor's crime syndicate to seek vengeance on Agastya. Agastya returns to Mughor, where he faces the entire Mughor criminal fraternity. Agastya kills Dheeraj and saves Nithya again. Though still holding a grudge against Agastya for Maara's death, Bala allows them to leave as a show of friendship towards Agastya. Agastya leaves Mughor and reciprocate the love towards Nithya.

== Cast ==
- Sriimurali as Agastya
- Haripriya as Nithya, Prabhakar's daughter
- Tilak Shekar as Bala, Agastya's best friend
- Avinash as Shivarudra Lingaiah
- Atul Kulkarni as Dheeraj, Shivarudra Lingaiah's son
- Dirty Beardo as Govardhan
- Jai Jagadish as Prabhakar
- Padmaja Rao as Agastya's mother
- Giri as Malla
- Mithra as Seena
- Shille Manjunath

== Production ==
=== Filming ===
Ugram was the first film ever to be shot outside the Bharat Gold Mines Limited cyanide dumps at Kolar Gold Fields. The other locations where the film was shot at include Kalaburagi, which was showcased as Mughor in the film, Bijapur District, Chintamani, Kolar, Mysore, Gargeshwari, Nandigrama, and Bangalore. Eight different cameras were used to suit different situations and locations.

== Soundtrack ==
Ugramm

Soundtrack album by Ravi Basrur
- Released: 21 February 2014
- Genre: Feature film soundtrack
- Length: 23:37
- Language: Kannada
- Label: D Beats

Ravi Basrur chronology
| Ugramm (2014) | Gargar Mandala (2014) |

The songs and background score were composed by Ravi Basrur with lyrics written by Ram Narayan, S. Sarvesh and Basrur. The soundtrack has six songs.

Track listing
| No. | Title | Lyrics | Singer(s) | Length |
|---|---|---|---|---|
| 1. | "Legend of Narasimha" | Ravi Basrur | Ravi Basrur | 4:08 |
| 2. | "Chanana Chanana" | Ram Narayan | Anuradha Bhat | 4:40 |
| 3. | "Ondu Hudugi" | Ram Narayan | Santhosh Venky, Anuradha Bhat | 3:37 |
| 4. | "Chittara Moodo" | S. Sarvesh | Priyanka Bharali | 3:46 |
| 5. | "Ugramm Veeram" | Ravi Basrur | Ravi Basrur | 3:48 |
| 6. | "Chittara Moodo Unplugged" | S. Sarvesh | Priyanka Bharali | 3:38 |
| Total length: | | | | 23:37 |

Reviewing the soundtrack album, Kavya Christopher of The Times of India wrote, "Apart from the title track – Ugramm Veeram – which rightfully captures the essence of the title, translating to aggression, the rest of the numbers take you into a romantic journey of dream sequences that many stories try to rely on to bring in some breathing space in an otherwise adrenaline-packed plot."

== Release ==
The film made its theatrical release on 21 February 2014 in 142 theaters across Karnataka. It was dubbed in Hindi as Main Hoon Fighter Badshah.

=== Box office ===
Ugramm collected ₹5.5 crore in Karnataka in the first week. It completed a 125-day run in theatres in Karnataka.

== Reception ==
=== Critical response ===
B. S. Srivani of Deccan Herald wrote, "An overdose of violence to simple-minded families, Ugramm, however, is a treat for those looking for instant kicks." A. Sharadhaa of The New Indian Express wrote, "This is a landmark gangster film that balances commercial elements with a stirring screenplay. A very well-made film, Ugramm is full of action, drama and fleshed out characters." Shyam Prasad S. of Bangalore Mirror gave 3/5 stars and wrote, "The film is technically brilliant, but what it lacks is a style to the excessive energy that is drummed up." The Times of India gave 3.5/5 stars and wrote, "Set in the North Karnataka region of Mughor, Ugramm keeps viewers hooked from the beginning with its lively script and brilliant narration. Though the loud background music drowns the dialogues at times, the action-packed sequences make up for all shortcomings."

== Accolades ==
| Award | Category | Recipients | Result | Ref |
|---|---|---|---|---|
| 4th South Indian International Movie Awards | Best Film | Inkfinite Pictures | Nominated | |
| 4th South Indian International Movie Awards | Best Director | Prashanth Neel | Nominated | |
| 4th South Indian International Movie Awards | Best Actor | Sriimurali | Nominated | |
| 4th South Indian International Movie Awards | Best Supporting Actor | Thilak Shekar | Nominated | |
| 4th South Indian International Movie Awards | Best Debut Producer | Inkfinite Pictures | Won | |
| 4th South Indian International Movie Awards | Best Debut Director | Prashanth Neel | Won | |
| 62nd Filmfare Awards South | Best Film | Inkfinite Pictures | Nominated | |
| 62nd Filmfare Awards South | Best Director | Prashanth Neel | Nominated | |
| 62nd Filmfare Awards South | Best Actor | Srimurali | Nominated | |
| 62nd Filmfare Awards South | Best Actress | Haripriya | Nominated | |
| 62nd Filmfare Awards South | Best Supporting Actor | Thilak | Nominated | |
| 62nd Filmfare Awards South | Best Supporting Actress | Padmaja Rao | Nominated | |
| 62nd Filmfare Awards South | Best Music Director | Ravi Basrur | Nominated | |
| 62nd Filmfare Awards South | Best Playback Singer - Female | Anuradha Bhat ("Chanchana Chanchana") | Won | |

== Sequel, Remake and Adaptation ==
A sequel to the film titled Ugramm Veeram to be made in 2015, was announced by Srimurali in July 2014, but there have been no official updates till date. It was remade in Odia as Agastya starring Anubhav Mohanty. A Marathi remake titled Raanti starring Sharad Kelkar and Shanvi Srivastava was announced in August 2022.

The 2023 film Salaar: Part 1 – Ceasefire directed by Neel was a retelling of the story, which he did not perceive as a remake. Neel expressed that Ugramm always held a special place in his heart and wanted to do justice to its story. Following the pan-Indian success of KGF: Chapter 2, Neel saw the new markets opened by KGF as an opportunity to not let his "best stories languish on YouTube". He wanted "Ugramm to reach the heights of KGF" and emphasized that "scaling up Ugramm to create Salaar was solely about enhancing the storytelling."
