= Puneeth Rajkumar filmography =

Indian film actor filmography

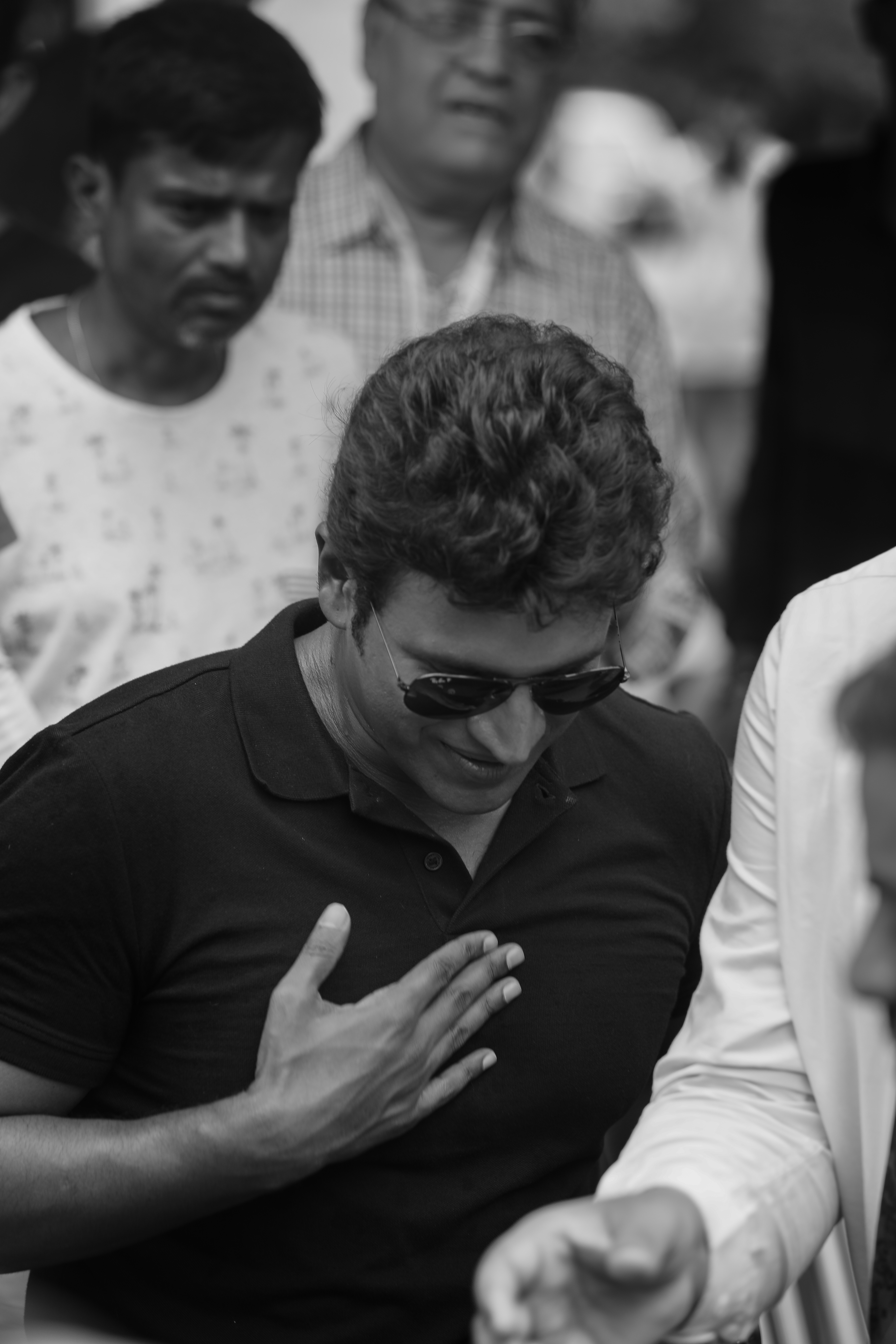
Puneeth Rajkumar in 2020

Puneeth Rajkumar was an Indian actor known for his work in Kannada films. As a six-month-old infant, he made a cameo appearance in V. Somashekar's Premada Kanike (1976) and followed it with Sanaadi Appanna (1977) when he was a year old. Most of his earlier films had his father Rajkumar playing his reel father as well. Films like Thayige Thakka Maga, Vasantha Geetha and Bhagyavantha followed up which also showcased his singing skills. For the N. Lakshminarayan film Bettada Hoovu he was awarded the National Film Award for Best Child Artist. He ended his childhood appearances with the action film Parashuram.

Puneeth's first leading role came opposite Rakshita in Appu (2002), a highly successful romantic drama directed by Puri Jagannadh. This was followed by Abhi opposite Ramya in 2003, and Veera Kannadiga and Maurya in 2004. All these films were commercially successful and established him as one of the leading actors in Kannada cinema. He was known for his versatile stunts, especially his backflips. His superhuman flexibility was attributed by some to his Idiga background, who were agile toddy tappers.

Puneeth's first award-winning performance came through the film Arasu for which he won the Filmfare Award For Best Actor and his next release Milana earned him the Karnataka State Film Award. His other major successes include Jackie, Hudugaru, Rana Vikrama, Raajakumara and Natasaarvabhowma, Yuvarathnaa.

== Films ==
=== As actor ===
Key
†	Denotes films that have not yet been released

- All films are in Kannada, unless otherwise noted.

Year	Title	Role	Notes	Ref.
1976	Premada Kanike	An infant	Credited as Master Rajkumar	
1977	Sanaadi Appanna	Young Ashok	Credited as Master Lohith	
1978	Thayige Thakka Maga	Young Kumar	Credited as Master Lohith	
1980	Vasantha Geetha	Shyaam	Credited as Master Lohith	
1981	Bhoomige Banda Bhagavantha	Krishna	Credited as Master Lohith	
1981	Bhagyavantha	Krishna	Credited as Master Lohith	
1982	Hosa Belaku	Puttu	Credited as Master Lohith	
1982	Chalisuva Modagalu	Ramu	Credited as Master Lohith	
1983	Bhakta Prahlada	Prahlada	Credited as Master Lohith	
1983	Eradu Nakshatragalu	Raja	Credited as Master Lohith	
1984	Yarivanu	Shyam	Credited as Master Lohith	
1985	Bettada Hoovu	Ramu	Credited as Master Puneeth	
1988	Shiva Mecchida Kannappa	Young Dinna	Credited as Master Puneeth Rajkumar	
1989	Parashuram	Appu	Child Actor	
2002	Appu	Appu	Debut in Lead Role	
2003	Abhi	Abhishek "Abhi"		
2004	Veera Kannadiga	Munna/Shankar	Dual role	
2004	Maurya	Manu		
2005	Aakash	Aakash		
2005	Namma Basava	Basava		
2006	Ajay	Ajay		
2007	Arasu	Shivaraj Arasu		
2007	Milana	Aakash		
2008	Bindaas	Shivu		
2008	Vamshi	Vamshi		
2009	Raaj – The Showman	Muthuraj		
2009	Raam	Raam		
2010	Prithvi	Prithvi Kumar		
2010	Jackie	Janakirama "Jackie"	Udaya Film Award for Best Actor; Nominated—Filmfare Award for Best Actor – Kannada	
2011	Hudugaru	Prabhu		
2011	Paramathma	Param		
2012	Anna Bond	Bond Ravi		
2012	Yaare Koogadali	Kumara		
2014	Ninnindale	Vicky Venkatesh		
2014	Power***	Bharath Kumar IPS		
2015	Mythri	Himself	Partially reshot in Malayalam as My Hero Mythri	
2015	Rana Vikrama	ACP Vikram Kumar / Rana Vikrama	Dual role	
2016	Chakravyuha	Lohith		
2016	Doddmane Hudga	Surya		
2017	Raajakumara	Siddharth	Love Lavike Readers Choice Award for Best Actor – Male; Zee Kannada Hemmeya Kannadiga Award for Best Actor – Male; Filmfare Award for Best Actor – Kannada; Nominated—TSR National Film Award for Best Actor	
2017	Anjani Putra	Viraj		
2018	Humble Politician Nograj	Himself	Cameo appearance	
2019	Natasaarvabhowma	Gagan Dixit		
2019	Padde Huli	Himself	Cameo appearance	
2020	Mayabazar 2016	Himself	Cameo appearance in the song "Loka Maya Bazaru"	
2021	Yuvarathnaa	Yuvaraj		
2022	James	Santosh Kumar "James"	Posthumous film	
2022	Lucky Man	God	Posthumous release; Extended cameo appearance	
2022	Gandhada Gudi	Himself	Posthumous documentary film	
2023	Hostel Hudugaru Bekkagiddare	Himself	Posthumous release. Special appearance at end credits.	
2026	Raktha Kashmira	Himself	Posthumous Final film release; Special appearance in the song "Star Star"	

=== Voice roles ===
Year	Title	Character	Notes	Ref.
2014	Bahaddur	Narrator		
2018	Amoli	Narrator	Documentary; Kannada version	
2018	Rajaratha	Rajaratha (voice)	Narrator	
2020	India vs England	Narrator		

=== As producer ===
Key
†	Denotes films that have not yet been released

Year	Title	Notes	Ref.
2019	Kavaludaari		
2020	Mayabazar 2016		
2020	Law	Amazon Prime film	
2020	French Biriyani	Amazon Prime film	
2022	One Cut Two Cut	Amazon Prime film; Posthumous release	
2022	Family Pack	Amazon Prime film, Posthumous release	
2022	Man of the Match	Amazon Prime film, Posthumous release	
2022	Gandhada Gudi	Posthumous release	
2023	Aachar & Co	Posthumous release	

=== As costume designer ===
Year	Title	Notes	Ref.
1993	Navibbaru Namagibbaru	for Raghavendra Rajkumar	

== Television ==
Year	Title	Role	TV channel	Notes	Ref.
2012	Kannadada Kotyadhipati	Host	Asianet Suvarna	Season 1	
2013	Kannadada Kotyadhipati	Host	Asianet Suvarna	Season 2	
2014	UPstarters	Judge	Udaya TV		
2014	Weekend with Ramesh	Guest	Zee Kannada	Season 1	
2016-2018	Manedevru	Producer	Colors Kannada		
2017	Majaa Talkies	Guest	Colors Kannada	Season 1	
2017	Dance Dance Juniors	Guest	Star Suvarna		
2017–2018	Family Power	Host	Colors Kannada		
2019	Kannadada Kotyadhipati	Host	Colors Kannada	Season 4	
2020	Majaa Talkies	Guest	Colors Kannada	Season 2	
2021	Netravathi	Producer	Udaya TV		
2021	Dance Karnataka Dance	Guest	Zee Kannada		
2021	Dance Dance	Guest	Star Suvarna		
2025	Maarigallu	Mayuravarma	Zee5	Posthumous AI appearance	
