= Yuvarathnaa (soundtrack) =

Soundtrack album by S. Thaman
- Released: 19 March 2021
- Recorded: 2020–2021
- Genre: Feature film soundtrack
- Language: Kannada
- Label: Hombale Music
- Producer: S. Thaman

S. Thaman chronology
Wild Dog (2021)	Yuvarathnaa (2021)	Vakeel Saab (2021)

Singles from Yuvarathnaa
- 1. "Power Of Youth" Released: 29 November 2020; 2. "Neenaade Naa" Released: 25 December 2020; 3. "Oorigobba Raja" Released: 22 February 2021; 4. "Paathshaala" Released: 3 March 2021; 5. "Feel The Power" Released: 10 March 2021; 6. "Nagu Nagutha Ninu" Released: 17 March 2022

Yuvarathnaa is the soundtrack album composed by S. Thaman for the 2021 Indian Kannada-language film of the same name, starring Puneeth Rajkumar. The film marks Thaman's third collaboration with Puneeth after working with him in Power (2014) and Chakravyuha (2016).

Santhosh Ananddram, the director of this film initially stated that the film will have music by V. Harikrishna in their third collaboration after Mr. and Mrs. Ramachari (2014) and Raajakumara (2017). In October 2018, Puneeth Rajkumar took to Instagram, to announce that the entire Raajakumara team (which included the actor, director, composer and the production house Hombale Films), will be joining this project. But, Thaman roped in as the composer in July 2019, after Harikrishna's exit due to schedule conflicts. Thus, Yuvarathnaa marked Thaman's first collaboration with Santhosh Ananddram.

Recording of the songs began within March 2020, before the COVID-19 pandemic lockdown in India. After multiple delays, the makers released the first song "Power of Youth" in November 2020. All the tracks of the film were released as singles, before being bundled into the film's soundtrack and releasing on 19 March 2021.

== Development ==
In late May 2020, Santhosh released a still from the song "Power Of Youth" through his Twitter account, which created curiosity among the fans. The song was in the making before March 2020, but was delayed due to the COVID-19 pandemic. After fans demanded about the first single, Thaman asked his fans to co-operate since he couldn't complete the progress of the song, due to the lockdown imposed in Chennai, where his studio was located; He also stated that the musicians and singers were facing problems, which may delay in music composition. At a special poster released on the occasion of Varamahalakshmi Vrata, 31 July 2020, the poster features few lines from the song "Power Of Youth". On late September 2020, the makers released a still featuring Puneeth Rajkumar, singing a song which was tentatively titled as "Oorigobba Raja".

== Release ==
The makers announced that the song "Power Of Youth" will release simultaneously in two languages - Kannada and Telugu. Nakash Aziz sung that song for the film; whereas the Kannada version had lyrics written by the film's director Santhosh Ananddram. Deciding not to tie up with any music labels, the makers planned to release the lyrical version of the song directly through the YouTube channel of its production house on the same day. The second single track titled "Neenaade Naa" in Kannada (written by Ghouse Peer) was released on 25 December 2020, coinciding with Christmas. Rakshit Shetty and Vijay Deverakonda released the songs in their respective versions, which featured vocals by Armaan Malik and Shreya Ghoshal respectively.

The song "Paathshaala" which was sung by Vijay Prakash, with Ananddram was supposed to be released on 18 February 2021, which unexpectedly delayed due to technical issues. However, another song "Oorigobba Raja" sung by Puneeth Rajkumar was released on 22 February 2021. It was simultaneously released in Telugu with the male version of the vocals were rendered by Dinker Kalvala, and Ramya Behara sang the female portions for both the versions. The song "Paatashaala" was later released on 3 March 2021. According to S. Thaman, the song was the main reason behind the essence of the whole film was formed. On 10 March 2021, the fifth and final song "Feel The Power" was released through streaming platforms.

The Tamil and Hindi soundtracks were released at a later date.

Following Puneeth Rajkumar's death, a single titled "Nagu Nagutha Ninu" to the tune of "Paatashaala" was added to the soundtrack and released on what would have been Puneeth Rajkumar's 47th birthday, 17 March 2022.

== Track listing ==
Yuvarathnaa (Kannada) (Original Motion Picture Soundtrack)
No.	Title	Lyrics	Singer(s)	Length
1.	"Power Of Youth"	Santhosh Ananddram	Nakash Aziz	4:57
2.	"Neenaade Naa"	Ghouse Peer	Armaan Malik, Shreya Ghoshal	4:12
3.	"Oorigobba Raaja"	Santhosh Ananddram	Puneeth Rajkumar, Ramya Behara	3:39
4.	"Paatashaala - The Soul of Yuvarathnaa"	Santhosh Ananddram	Vijay Prakash	5:22
5.	"Feel The Power"	Santhosh Ananddram	Shashank Sheshagiri	4:03
6.	"Nagu Nagutha Ninu"	Santhosh Ananddram	Vijay Prakash	4:49

Yuva (Tamil) (Original Motion Picture Soundtrack)
No.	Title	Lyrics	Singer(s)	Length
1.	"Power of Youth"	Ku. Karthik	Aditya Iyengar	4:45
2.	"Neeyagiraen"	Ku. Karthik	Srikrishna Vishnubhotla, Sahithi Chaganti	3:53
3.	"Ooril Oru Raja"	Ku. Karthik	Saisharan Bhaskaruni, Ramya Behara	2:46
4.	"Dhesaththin Balama"	Vignesh Shivan	Vijay Yesudas	4:39
5.	"Feel The Power"	Ku. Karthik	Hanuman	3:56

Yuvarathnaa (Telugu) (Original Motion Picture Soundtrack)
No.	Title	Lyrics	Singer(s)	Length
1.	"Power Of Youth"	Ramajogayya Sastry	Nakash Aziz, Aditya Iyengar, Geetha Madhuri	4:57
2.	"Aarambame"	Ramajogayya Sastry	Armaan Malik, Shreya Ghoshal	4:12
3.	"Oorikokka Raaja"	Kalyan Chakravarthy	Dinker Kalvala, Ramya Behara	3:39
4.	"Paatashaala - The Soul of Yuvarathnaa"	Kalyan Chakravarthy	Vishal Mishra	5:22
5.	"Feel The Power"	Ramajoggaya Sastry	L. V. Revanth	4:03

Yuva (Hindi) (Original Motion Picture Soundtrack)
No.	Title	Lyrics	Singer(s)	Length
1.	"Power of Youth"	Raghav Pandey	Aditya Iyengar	4:45
2.	"Tera Hua"	Raghav Pandey	Krishna Chaitanya, Sahithi Chaganti	3:53
3.	"Hodi Pe Aaja Raja"	Raghav Pandey	Saketh Komanduri, Ramya Behara	2:46
4.	"Desh Ke Yodha"	Kumar	Vishal Mishra	4:39
5.	"Feel The Power"	Raghav Pandey	Raghuram	3:56
