= List of awards and nominations received by Puneeth Rajkumar =

Puneeth Rajkumar awards and nominations
Awards and nominations
Award	Wins	Nominations
National Film Awards	1	1
Karnataka State Film Awards	4	4
SIIMA	5	8
Filmfare Awards South	6	11

Totals (Note: Certain award groups do not simply award one winner. They acknowledge several different recipients, have runners-up, and have third place. Since this is a specific recognition and is different from losing an award, runner-up mentions are considered wins in this award tally. For simplification and to avoid errors, each award in this list has been presumed to have had a prior nomination.)
- Wins: 21
- Nominations: 32

Puneeth Rajkumar was an Indian film actor, playback singer and producer who worked in the Kannada film industry. He has been nominated for and won various awards throughout his career. On November 1, 2022, he was awarded Karnataka Ratna after his death. On 22 March 2022, he was posthumously awarded an honorary doctorate from the University of Mysore at its 102nd convocation

== Awards and nominations ==
Awards and nominations received by Puneeth Rajkumar
Award	Year	Nominated work	Category	Result	Ref.
Cinema Express Awards	2002	Appu	Best Actor – Kannada	Won	
Filmfare Awards South	1985	Bettada Hoovu	Filmfare Best Child Actor	Won	
Filmfare Awards South	2007	Arasu	Best Actor	Won	
Filmfare Awards South	2011	Hudugaru	Best Actor	Won	
Filmfare Awards South	2012	Anna Bond	Best Actor	Nominated	
Filmfare Awards South	2014	Power	Best Actor	Nominated	
Filmfare Awards South	2014	"Guruvur Sange" from Power***	Best Male Playback Singer	Nominated	
Filmfare Awards South	2015	Rana Vikrama	Best Actor	Won	
Filmfare Awards South	2016	Doddmane Hudga	Best Actor	Nominated	
Filmfare Awards South	2016	"Jhanak Jhanak" from Run Antony	Best Male Playback Singer	Nominated	
Filmfare Awards South	2017	Raajakumara	Best Actor	Won	
Filmfare Awards South	2022	Contribution to Indian Cinema & Especially Kannada Cinema	Filmfare Lifetime Achievement Award - South	Won	
Karnataka State Film Awards	1982-83	Chalisuva Modagalu	Best Child Actor	Won	
Karnataka State Film Awards	1983–84	Eradu Nakshatragalu	Best Child Actor	Won	
Karnataka State Film Awards	2007–08	Milana	Best Actor	Won	
Karnataka State Film Awards	2010–11	Jackie	Best Actor	Won	
Mirchi Music Awards South	2015	"Adhyaksha Adhyaksha" from Adyaksha	Sensational Singer of The Year	Nominated	
National Film Awards	1985	Bettada Hoovu	Best Child Artist	Won	
South Indian International Movie Awards	2011	Hudugaru	Best Actor	Won	
South Indian International Movie Awards	2012	Anna Bond	Best Actor	Nominated	
South Indian International Movie Awards	2013	Yaare Koogadali	Youth Icon of South Indian Cinema (male)	Won	
South Indian International Movie Awards	2016	Rana Vikrama	Best Actor	Won	
South Indian International Movie Awards	2017	Doddmane Hudga	Best Actor	Nominated	
South Indian International Movie Awards	2018	Raajakumara	Best Actor	Won	
South Indian International Movie Awards	2019	Natasaarvabhowma	Best Actor	Nominated	
South Indian International Movie Awards	2022	Yuvarathnaa	Best Actor	Won	
Suvarna Film Awards	2008	Milana	Best Actor	Won	
Suvarna Film Awards	2010	Jackie	Best Actor	Won	
Suvarna Film Awards	2013	Anna Bond	Favorite Hero	Won	
South Scope Awards	2008	Vamshi	Best Actor	Won	
South Scope Awards	2009	Raaj - The Showman	Best Actor	Won	
IIFA Utsavam	2017	"Maduve Munji" from Nanna Ninna Prema Kathe	Best Male Playback Singer	Nominated	
IIFA Utsavam	2017	"Jhanak Jhanak" from Run Anthony	Best Male Playback Singer	Nominated	

== Other honors ==
- The State Government announced to mark his birthday as "Inspiration Day".
- On May 3 2022, he was given the Basavashree Award posthumously for the year 2021.
- The 212th edition of Lalbagh flower show was dedicated as a tribute to him and his father matinee idol Dr.Rajkumar.
- His tableau was made on the occasion of 2022 Mysore Dasara Jamboo Savari procession.
- Dolls conceptualized on him were reported to be the highlight of 2022 Dasara doll display.
- An entire day was dedicated to screen his movies at the 2022 Dasara Film Festival.
- He was posthumously conferred with the Lifetime Achievement Award at the 67th Filmfare Awards.
- On October 22 & 23, 2022 restaurants of Bengaluru hosted a food festival - Flavours of Gandhada Gudi on the occasion of his last theatrical release Gandhada Gudi.
- All the 200 Kannada movies which released within one year of his demise, paid tribute to him in their opening credits.
- 75 cutouts with garlands were erected outside his memorial on his first death anniversary.
- One of the 75 satellites intended to be launched into orbit during November 15 to December 2022 on the occasion of the 75th year of Indian independence was named after him.
- The Bengaluru Outer Ring Road 12-km stretch between Nayandahalli Junction on Mysuru Road and Vega City Mall on Bannerghatta Road was named as Dr. Puneeth Rajkumar Road.
- 23 Feet height statue of Puneeth was unveiled as part of inauguration of the Ballari Utsava in Bellary in 2023.
- In March 2023, the then Karnataka Chief Minister Bommai inaugurated a multispecialty hospital built in the name of the actor at Nayandahalli in Govindarajanagar constituency.
- The Karnataka Health Department on 31 October 2023 launched Dr. Puneeth Rajkumar Hrudaya Jyoti Yojana to treat people suffering from sudden heart attacks and cardiac issues. The second phase of the scheme was launched in March 2024. In July 2024, it was reported that as many as 10 patients, who reported with chest pain and related symptoms, got a new lease of life in taluk hospitals in Karnataka over a period of 10 days due to early diagnosis and treatment under this scheme. Based on its success in 86 government hospitals, it was announced on 28 September 2024 on the occasion of "World Heart Day" that the facility would be extended to all the taluks in the State.
- A few Bengalureans, on 5 December 2023, paid tribute to him by painting a mural in Basavanagudi.
- At the 13th State Level Philatelic Exhibition KARNAPEX - 2024 conducted from January 5th to January 8th, "Special Postal Cover" dedicated to Puneeth Rajkumar was released.
- A free mass marriage event to commemorate the birth anniversary of Puneeth Rajkumar was organised on March 17 2024 at Dasara Exhibition premises in Mysuru.
- In January 2025, it was reported that a playbook on AI titled "Breaking into AI: The Ultimate Interview Playbook" by Shubakar Shetty was inspired by the generosity of Puneeth Rajkumar.
- India Post announced the release of five special picture postcards on 17th March 2025 featuring Puneeth Rajkumar to commemorate his 50th birthday.
