= Kanteerava Studios =

Indian movie studio

Kanteerava Studios was planned and allotted for the development of Kannada films.

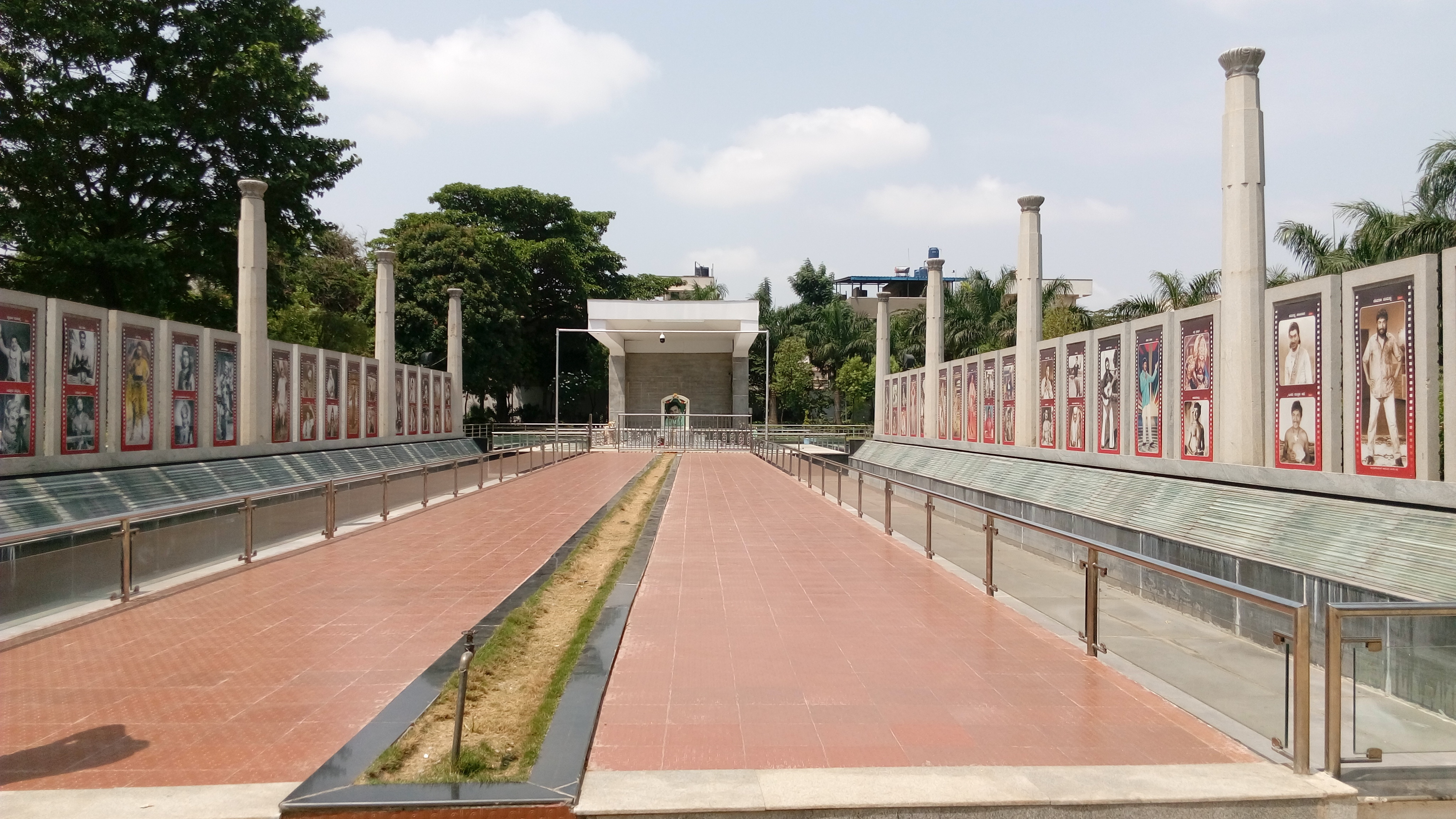
Kanteerava studio in 2017

Rajkumar and his son Puneeth Rajkumar, popular actors in Kannada cinema, are buried within the studio grounds.

== History ==
In 1966 the Kanteerava Studio was founded by Gubbi Veeranna, TS Karibasavaiah and the politician KV Shankare Gowda. It was launched as a joint stock company on 20 acres (81,000 m^{2}) of land. The studio was started with the Government of Karnataka holding 93 per cent of the share capital and the remaining 7 per cent by private shareholders. It commenced operations in 1970 at Goraguntepalya in Bengaluru. The studio suffered losses, as new generation of film-makers and new techniques took over the industry. Several decades later it was eventually taken over by the government.

In 2005, the State Government initiated a proposal to revive the studio by leashing in private firms for the maintenance. This was followed by two recommendations by the Public Sector Reforms Commission that is, either to close down unhealthy government undertakings or to go for private partnerships to revive them. The government then informed that, it was open to offer seventy four per cent maintenance-related investments to private partners, however, without compensating the government's authority over the decision-making.

== Burial of Rajkumar ==
On 13 April 2006, Kanteerava Studios, which is considered as a major landmark in the history of Kannada cinema, became the burial ground of Rajkumar, who is generally considered as Kannada cinema's greatest son.

Dr. Rajkumar died at his home in Sadashiva Nagar, Bangalore, on 12 April 2006 (13.45 IST) following a cardiac arrest. Due to his larger than life image, the city virtually came to a halt as the news spread about the death. His death precipitated a citywide reaction comparable to the time he was kidnapped by Veerappan. Following the news of his death, Bangalore city saw violence by people claiming to be his fans. The Chief Minister H.D. Kumaraswamy later claimed that the violence was instigated by vested political interests. An unofficial bandh (closure of all shops and other establishments) was announced.

The state government declared a statewide holiday on 13 April as a mark of respect to the departed soul, who was also a recipient of Karnataka Ratna (Gem of Karnataka) award. Private firms and businesses all over the city and many parts of the state remained closed due to the holiday. The body was kept initially at Rajkumar's home in Sadashiva Nagar. Due to the immense crowd pressure, the body was moved initially to Palace Grounds and then later to the Sree Kanteerava Stadium. He was laid to rest in Kanteerava Studios, on 13 April 2006.

== Dr. Rajkumar Memorial (now Puneeth Rajkumar too) ==
In the premises of Kanteerava Studio, the Karnataka Government is setting up a memorial for Kannada thespian Rajkumar, with the estimated cost of Rs 10 crore. The blueprint of the memorial will be constituted by a panel comprising the Rajkumar family members, representatives of the Kannada film industry and the state government.

A permanent exhibition on the history of the Kannada film industry and Rajkumar's movies will be an integral part of the memorial. In the respect of Rajkumar's prolonged association with the studio, the actor's trophies and souvenirs will be put up for exhibition at the memorial. The studio, located in Nandini Layout, in the northern part of the Bangalore city, has become a tourist spot after the demise of Rajkumar.
