= Vakeel Saab =

2021 film by Venu Sriram

- Theatrical release poster
- Directed by: Venu Sriram
- Screenplay by: Venu Sriram
- Dialogues by: Mamidala Thirupathi
- Story by: Shoojit Sircar; Ritesh Shah; Aniruddha Roy Chowdhury
- Based on: Pink (Hindi) by Aniruddha Roy Chowdhury
- Produced by: Dil Raju; Sirish; Boney Kapoor
- Starring: Pawan Kalyan; Nivetha Thomas; Anjali; Ananya Nagalla; Prakash Raj; Shruti Haasan
- Cinematography: P. S. Vinod
- Edited by: Prawin Pudi
- Music by: S. Thaman
- Production companies: Sri Venkateswara Creations; Bayview Projects
- Release date: 9 April 2021
- Running time: 156 minutes
- Country: India
- Language: Telugu
- Budget: ₹80 crore
- Box office: ₹137.65 crore

Vakeel Saab (transl. Mr Lawyer) is a 2021 Indian Telugu-language legal drama film co-written and directed by Venu Sriram. The film was produced by Dil Raju, Sirish and Boney Kapoor under their banners Sri Venkateswara Creations and Bayview Projects. It is a remake of the 2016 Hindi-language film Pink and stars Pawan Kalyan, Nivetha Thomas, Anjali, Ananya Nagalla, Prakash Raj, and Shruti Haasan. The film features score and soundtrack by S. Thaman. Despite the second COVID lockdown being announced just five days after its release, the movie went on to become a box office hit following Agnyaathavaasi

Principal photography of the film began in January 2020 in Hyderabad and the film was released on 9 April 2021. Vakeel Saab faced several challenges, including canceled benefit shows and blocked ticket price hikes due to the Andhra Pradesh government's refusal to enforce a High Court-approved increase, reportedly due to political vendetta against Pawan Kalyan. Additionally, many screenings were canceled shortly after its release due to a lockdown imposed following the severe second wave of COVID-19 in the country. Despite these issues, the film grossed ₹137.65 crore worldwide, becoming the second highest-grossing Telugu film of the year with ticket prices ranging from just 5 rupees to 25 rupees in Andhra Pradesh.

== Plot ==
Pallavi, Zareena, and Divya are independent, middle-class working women living together in Hyderabad. One night, after their car breaks down on a highway, Pallavi's friend Viswa offers them a lift. Later, Bunty and Viswa rush a severely injured Vamsi to the hospital. Meanwhile, the three women return home in a taxi, appearing shaken, implying their involvement in the incident. They try to move on, but Vamsi, seeking revenge, threatens them, leading to Zareena losing her job. The local police, aware of Vamsi's powerful connections through his father, MP Korentla Rajendra, discourage the women from filing a complaint.

The next day, Pallavi is kidnapped by Vamsi's friends, who threaten, blackmail, and molest her in a moving car before dropping her back home, leaving her traumatized. A few days later, Pallavi is arrested based on a complaint from Vamsi, who labels the women as prostitutes and charges Pallavi with attempted murder. In despair, Zareena and Divya encounter Satyadev, a seemingly alcoholic man who suggests they seek emergency bail. Initially skeptical of his help, they later learn that Satyadev was once a reputable lawyer but was suspended for four years after harming a fellow lawyer in court. Concurrently, his wife Amrutha died due to pregnancy complications while he was away on an important case, leading him into depression and alcoholism. Although he initially declines to help, an attack by Rajendra's men motivates Satyadev to represent Pallavi in court.

In court, Vamsi's lawyer, Advocate Nanda Gopal, argues that the women, after being helped by Vamsi and his friends, demanded money for sexual favors, painting them as prostitutes. He attacks Pallavi's character, emphasizing her choice to live with friends despite having family in Hyderabad. The women counter, claiming Vamsi attempted to rape Pallavi, who acted in self-defense. Satyadev's defense centers on the concept of consent and a woman's right to say no.

During the trial, Satyadev exposes the police's collusion with Vamsi, revealing inconsistencies in the complaint timeline and proving Pallavi was not immediately arrested despite lodging a complaint against Vamsi. Nanda's attempts to provoke Zareena into admitting to taking money from the men causes a moment of distress, but Satyadev presses on, ultimately causing Vamsi to admit the truth in a fit of rage, saying the women "got what they deserved."

Satyadev criticizes societal double standards that label women as immoral for behaviors that are acceptable for men, emphasizing that "no means no" regardless of context. Following the trial, Satyadev and the women are attacked on a train by Siva but manage to fend off the attackers and return to court. The women are acquitted; Vamsi, Bunty, and Siva face pending sentences; and Viswa is let off with a warning.

After the case, Satyadev resumes his legal career to help ordinary people, Zareena regains her job, Pallavi gets engaged, and Divya moves into her newly constructed home.

== Cast ==
- Pawan Kalyan as Advocate Konidela Satyadev / "Vakeel Saab"
- Nivetha Thomas as Vemula Pallavi
- Anjali as Zareena Begum
- Ananya Nagalla as Divya Nayak
- Prakash Raj as Advocate Nandagopal
- Shruti Haasan as Amrutha Konidela, Satyadev's wife (special appearance)
- Vamsi Krishna as Korentla Vamsi, Rajender's son
- Mukesh Rishi as MP Korentla Rajendar, Vamsi's father
- Srikanth Iyyengar as CI K. Yugander
- Lirisha as SI Saraladevi
- Kedar Shankar as Vemula Kedarnath, Pallavi's father
- Kamal Kamaraju as Anwar, Zareena's fiancé
- Ananda Chakrapani as Aravind Nayak, Divya's father
- Anish Kuruvilla as Subhojit Rana, Zareena's CEO Manager Only
- Subhalekha Sudhakar as Flat Owner
- Sarath Babu as Discipline Committee Chairman
- Chaitanya Krishna as Suchaant, Satyadev's college friend
- Shivakumar Ramachandravarapu as Viswa
- Kalyan as Bunty
- Amit Sharma as Siva
- Nagineedu as ACP B. Ravinder
- Sayaji Shinde as Minister Shankar Reddy
- Kancharapalem Raju
- Dev Gill as Shankar Reddy's right-hand
- C. V. L. Narasimha Rao
- Rupa Lakshmi
- Appaji Ambarisha Darbha as Amrutha's father
- Sammeta Gandhi as Ranganna
- Ramesh Reddy as Chari
- Swarnakanth as Nandagopal's assistant lawyer
- Sunitha Manohar as Constable P. Kavitha

== Production ==
=== Development ===
Venu Sriram began working on the Telugu remake of Pink (2016) after his project with Allu Arjun, Icon, was put on hold. On November 2, 2019, it was announced that Pawan Kalyan would star in this remake. This would mark Kalyan's return to acting after a hiatus due to his political campaign in the 2019 Andhra Pradesh Legislative Assembly election. The film, was to be produced by Boney Kapoor and Dil Raju, and was set to be directed by Venu Sriram with dialogues by Trivikram Srinivas. It was scheduled to start production in December 2019.

On January 20, 2020, filming for the Telugu remake of Pink began. This film marked Kalyan's return to cinema after a two-year break following Agnyaathavaasi (2018). The project was announced as a joint production between Dil Raju of Sri Venkateswara Creations and Boney Kapoor's Bayview Projects LLP, which acquired the Telugu and Tamil remake rights of Pink (the Tamil version being Nerkonda Paarvai). The film features music by S. Thaman, marking his first collaboration with Kalyan, cinematography by P. S. Vinod, and editing by Prawin Pudi.

During the pre-production works, the tentative titles Maguva, Lawyer Saab, and Vakeel Saab, were under consideration for the film before Vakeel Saab was finalised as official title in March 2020. In a September 2020 interview, director Venu Sriram announced that the film cannot be made as a commercial entertainer due to the social issues involved in the Hindi counterpart, but staying true to the original script, the team had made some changes suiting Pawan Kalyan's body language.

=== Casting ===
Pawan Kalyan was reported to essay Amitabh Bachchan's role while Anjali, Nivetha Thomas, and Ananya Nagalla were cast in pivotal roles. The team decided to approach Shruti Haasan and Ileana D'Cruz to appear for a cameo role, essaying the character of Kalyan's wife in the film. While Haasan initially refuted being a part of the film's cast, she later confirmed her presence in July 2020, despite not revealing her role in the film.

=== Filming ===
Principal photography of the film commenced on 20 January 2020 in Hyderabad. In the end of February 2020, shooting of the film took place at Annapurna Studios with intense scenes being shot on Pawan Kalyan and Prakash Raj. The film's production was halted for six months due to COVID-19 pandemic in March 2020 and on 22 September 2020, the shooting of the film resumed in Hyderabad, following the relaxation of COVID-19 lockdown in India with the team following the safety guidelines imposed by the government to control COVID-19 spread. Major scenes not featuring Kalyan were shot during this schedule.

On 6 October, Nivetha Thomas joined the sets of the film. Later on 1 November, Kalyan joined the sets of the film with the team planning to shoot the entire schedule within 15 days. Some scenes of the film were also shot in Hyderabad Metro. Kalyan completed filming his portions on 29 December 2020, whereas the team shot few sequences; the shooting of the film completed on 9 January 2021. Pawan Kalyan started dubbing for his portions for the film in March 2021 and completed within five days.

== Music ==
Vakeel Saab

Soundtrack album by S. Thaman
- Released: 2021
- Recorded: 2020–2021
- Genre: Feature film soundtrack
- Length: 18:06
- Language: Telugu
- Label: Aditya Music
- Producer: S. Thaman

S. Thaman chronology
Yuvarathnaa (2021)	Vakeel Saab (2021)	Tuck Jagadish (2021)
External audio
- Audio Jukebox on YouTube
- Film Score on YouTube

Singles from Vakeel Saab
- 1. "Maguva Maguva" Released: 8 March 2020; 2. "Sathyameva Jayathe" Released: 3 March 2021; 3. "Kanti Papa" Released: 17 March 2021; 4. "Kadhulu Kadhulu" Released: 7 April 2021

The film's soundtrack features five tracks composed by S. Thaman with lyrics written by Ramajogayya Sastry and Suddala Ashok Teja. The album was released on 31 March 2021 through Aditya Music label.

=== Production ===
On 12 February 2020, Thaman had announced that he is currently working on the production of the first song, with Sid Sriram collaborating with Thaman for the second time after "Samajavaragamana" from Ala Vaikunthapurramuloo with Ramajogayya Sastry writing the lyrics. Later on 26 February, Thaman stated the progress of the song with Fames Macedonian Symphonic Orchestra performing the sessions for it. That song was titled "Maguva Maguva" which is touted to be a "fitting tribute to women", and was released on 8 March 2020 (Women's Day). In September 2020, the lyrical video of the song crossed 30 million views on YouTube.

The production of the other songs and the background score was interrupted due to the COVID-19 pandemic lockdown. Nearly a year after the release of the first single, "Sathyameva Jayate", the second single from the film was unveiled on 3 March 2021. The song is picturised on Pawan Kalyan, whom being portrayed as a do-gooding lawyer who fights on behalf of the innocent, unprivileged and weaker sections of society. The third song "Kanti Papa" released on 17 March 2021, is played during the flashback portion featuring the romance track between Kalyan and Shruti Haasan. The team also planned to release a promotional song featuring Pawan Kalyan at the film's prerelease event, but it did not happen. The fourth song "Kadhulu Kadhulu" was unveiled along with the film's soundtrack album on 31 March 2021. A bonus track, which is the female version of "Maguva Maguva" was released on 15 April.

On 18 October 2021, Thaman announced that he was going to be releasing the film's score, due to popular demand, on all streaming platforms in November. The film's score was then released on 16 November 2021 on Aditya Music.

=== Marketing ===
As a part of the film's marketing purposes, #VakeelSaab Music Fest, a promotional music concert was organised by the producers. The first edition of this event took place at MLRITM College in Hyderabad on 20 March 2021. Following its response, the second edition of this event was held at Vizag and Kakinada on 23 March 2021. The events were attended by Thaman, Sastry and Sriram as the primary members. Thaman and his musical crew performed all the songs in the promotional music concert, as well as the film's prerelease event held at Shilpakala Vedika in Hyderabad on 4 April 2021.

=== Track listing ===
No.	Title	Lyrics	Singer(s)	Length
1.	"Maguva Maguva" (Male)	Ramajogayya Sastry	Sid Sriram	4:10
2.	"Sathyameva Jayathe"	Ramajogayya Sastry	Shankar Mahadevan, Prudhvi Chandra	3:39
3.	"Kanti Papa Kanti Papa"	Ramajogayya Sastry	Deepu, Armaan Malik	4:24
4.	"Kadhulu Kadhulu"	Suddala Ashok Teja	Sri Krishna, Vedala Hemachandra	2:56
5.	"Maguva Maguva" (Female)	Ramajogayya Sastry	Mohana Bhogaraju	2:53
Total length:				18:02

== Release ==
Vakeel Saab was scheduled to be released on 15 May 2020, but was postponed due to the COVID-19 pandemic. Dil Raju refuted the rumours of a direct release through over-the-top media service (OTT) and also stated that the film will be a theatrical release. In January 2021, a new release date of 9 April 2021 was announced.

The benefit shows for the opening day release was cancelled due to surge in COVID-19 cases. However, Dil Raju announced that the film will get benefit shows in select theatres across Telangana and Andhra Pradesh. The advance bookings for the film opened up on 6 April 2021, and saw a tremendous response from trade analysts.

Phars Film bought the distribution rights for United States which planned to screen in more than 700 theatres on 8 April, a day before the Indian release. Trade analyst Taran Adarsh announced through Twitter, stating that Panorama Studios acquired the distribution rights for the film in North Indian theatres. Vakeel Saab will also be screened at IMAX Melbourne, the world's largest cinema theatre.

The film is set for a limited theatrical re-release on 1 May 2024.

=== Marketing ===
The prerelease event of this film was scheduled to take place on 3 April 2021 at Yousufguda Police Grounds in Hyderabad. However, as the authorities denied permission for the promotional activities of the film citing surge in COVID-19 cases, the team decided to shift the venue at Shilpakala Vedika in Hyderabad on 4 April.

=== Prerelease revenue ===
Nizam distribution rights of the film were sold to ₹23 crore (US$2.4 million) and Ceded regions were sold for ₹12 crore (US$1.2 million). The rights for the distributors in the Uttarandhra region were sold to ₹10 crore (US$1.0 million), and at the east and west Godavari regions, the team sold the rights to an amount of ₹7 crore (US$730,000) and ₹6 crore (US$620,000) respectively. The Guntur rights were sold to ₹7 crore (US$730,000), Krishna rights for ₹6 crore (US$620,000) and Nellore rights for the ₹3.35 crore (US$350,000).

The film made a business of ₹74.35 crore (US$7.7 million) in the Andhra Pradesh and Telangana. In Karnataka and rest of India, the film made a business of ₹4 crore (US$420,000). The overseas rights were sold for ₹5 crore (US$520,000), fetching ₹83.90 crore (US$8.7 million) from theatrical rights alone.

=== Home media ===
The film's digital rights were sold to Amazon Prime Video and Aha and the satellite rights were sold to Zee Telugu respectively. The film however was streamed 21 days later through Amazon Prime Video on 30 April 2021 due to the COVID-19 pandemic in India.

=== Dubbed versions ===
The film was dubbed and released in Malayalam with the same name and in Kannada as Advocate. It was also dubbed in Tamil as Vakeel Sir despite the existence of a Tamil remake.

== Controversy ==
In early April 2021, the Andhra Pradesh High Court ruled that ticket prices for the film Vakeel Saab could be increased for the first three days. Despite this ruling, the Andhra Pradesh government did not enforce the decision, leading to allegations of deliberate obstruction. Government officials, including VROs and MROs, reportedly took control of ticket sales at theaters, sparking controversy. This decision resulted in protests from Pawan Kalyan's fans and criticism from the opposition BJP and TDP leaders.

== Reception ==
=== Critical reception ===
On the review aggregator website Rotten Tomatoes, 100% of 6 critics' reviews are positive, with an average rating of 6.5/10.

The Times of India critic Neeshita Nyayapati called Vakeel Saab a "courtroom drama with a generous dose of masala." She felt that Venu Sriram has stuck to the plot of Pink for the most part but tweaked the screenplay to suit Kalyan's image. She appreciated the score composed by Thaman. Hemanth Kumar in his Firstpost review rated the film 3/5 and wrote that the film is a celebration of Kalyan's stardom and an evocative commentary on how women are judged in the society. He observed that the film was at its best when it was close to source material. "Vakeel Saab wants to fight the right fight, even when it turns its gaze away from the three women at the centre of all the drama to glorify its lead actor," Kumar added.

Sangeetha Devi Dundoo of The Hindu stated that the film hit the right notes in the courtroom proceedings. On performances she noted that Nivetha, Anjali, and Ananya were "remarkable," Kalyan was at his best for the courtroom proceedings and Prakash Raj aced the role that requires him to be truly sinister. The Indian Express journalist Manoj Kumar R opined that director Sriram and Kalyan honoured the main subject and the message of the original film. A reviewer from Deccan Chronicle rated the film 3/5 and stated that the remake stays "true to the original" and the star cast delivered on their performances. Haricharan Pudipeddi in his Hindustan Times review compared the film with the other versions of the story (Pink and Nerkonda Paarvai) and opined that Vakeel Saab is "more massy and lightweight."

In a review for Telangana Today, L. Ravinchander wrote that Vakeel Saab is a mixed bag and added, "This court room drama has punch but a great opportunity to make a masterpiece goes abegging." Film Companion's Karthik Keramulu felt that the flash back episode took central focus away from the story of Pink but the court scenes featuring Kalyan and Prakash Raj were hotter than the original. Keramulu wondered whether the film would open up debates around the idea of consent or be understood as an action film where the hero saves the women.

Jahnvi Reddy of The News Minute called Vakeel Saab a "superficial remake" of Pink. She wrote that there might have been better ways of changing the script to venerate the star while staying true to the spirit of the story but alteration of several striking scenes from the original diluted the point they made. Cinema Express critic Ram Venkat Srikar stated that Vakeel Saab does a criminal disservice to the original. He criticised the dilution of narrative about consent and the addition of political undertones to the film.

=== Box office ===
On the opening day, the film grossed more than ₹42 crore at the box office, with a distributor's share of ₹33 crore. Box Office India reported that Vakeel Saab is the highest opener in India post the pandemic, netting over ₹38 crore on its first day. The film collected a gross of ₹100 crore in its first week.

At the US box office, the film grossed $300,000 on the opening day. Taran Adarsh through his Twitter account, reported that the film collected a gross of A$211,857 and NZ$19,220 at the Australian and New Zealand box offices in the first two days respectively.

Vakeel Saab netted ₹120 crore in India, surpassing the Hindi and Tamil versions of the film. By the end of its theatrical run, the film grossed ₹137.65 crore worldwide, earning the distributors a share of ₹86.1 crore.
