= Santhosh Ananddram =

Indian lyricist, screenwriter and director

- Born: 15 August 1985 (age 41); Bangalore, Karnataka, India
- Occupations: Director, Lyricist, Screenwriter
- Years active: 2006-Present
- Spouse: Surabhi Hathwar
- Awards: Zee Kannada 's Hemmeya Nirdeshaka (Best Director) for Raajakumara

Santhosh Ananddram is a lyricist, screenwriter, director who works in Kannada cinema. His debut films was Mr. and Mrs. Ramachari in 2014. He has directed Raajakumara and Yuvarathnaa starring Puneeth Rajkumar and Raajakumara was a blockbuster in Kannada cinema.

== Career ==
He started film career as a lyric writer through Rocky. He then assisted Harsha in script, dialogues and direction departments for Chingari. He also worked as a dialogue writer for Agraja and Gajakesari. He made his directional debut in 2014 with Industry hit Mr. and Mrs. Ramachari starring Yash (actor) and Radhika Pandit. His next movie Raajakumara with Puneeth Rajkumar was released on 24 March 2017 and received huge applause from critics and audience. After humongous success of Raajakumara and two straight industry hits, he rose to fame as "Star Director" of Kannada cinema.

Ananddram's upcoming film is with Kannada Star Puneeth Rajkumar titled YuvaRathnaa under Hombale Films. It was launched on 1 November 2018 on account of Kannada Rajyotsava. It was noted that two impaired kids from Chamarajanagar district came down to release the title of the movie. Ananddram was honoured with Zee Kannada's Hemmeya Nirdeshaka (Proud Director of Karnataka) for Raajakumara. He made his Tollywood debut with the film Yuvarathnaa in 2021.

== Personal life ==
Santhosh Ananddram is from Kota, Udupi district, Karnataka though he was born in and brought up in Bangalore. He has a Brother Sagar Ananddram, who assists him in Film Career. He did his schooling in Bangalore Education Society. He obtained a degree from Seshadripuram college, Bangalore. He was also recruited to Infosys where he worked for close to a year. He married Surabhi on 21 February 2018 in Bangalore.

== Filmography ==
Year	Film	Director	Writer	Lyricist	Notes
2014	Gajakesari	No	Story	No	
2014	Mr. and Mrs. Ramachari	Yes	Yes	Yes	Lyricist for "Yaaralli"
2017	Raajakumara	Yes	Yes	Yes	Lyricist for "Yarivanu Kannadadavanu", "Bombe Helutaithe", "Appu Dance"
2019	Yajamana	No	No	Yes	Lyricist for "Yajamana"
2019	Geetha	No	No	Yes	Lyricist for "Kannadiga", "Geetha Nanna Geetha"
2021	Yuvarathnaa	Yes	Yes	Yes	Lyricist for "Power Of Youth", "Oorigobba Raaja", "Paatashaala - The Soul of Yuvarathnaa", "Feel The Power"
2021	Kannadiga	No	No	Yes	Lyricist for "Kannadiga Title Track"
2023	Gurudev Hoysala	No	No	Yes	Lyricist for "Sala Sala Hoysala"
2023	Raghavendra Stores	Yes	Yes	Yes	
2024	Yuva	Yes	Yes	Yes	

== Awards ==
Film	Award	Category	Result	Ref.
Mr. and Mrs. Ramachari	62nd Filmfare Awards South	Best Director	Nominated	
Mr. and Mrs. Ramachari	4th South Indian International Movie Awards	Best Director	Won	
Mr. and Mrs. Ramachari	4th South Indian International Movie Awards	Best Debutant Director	Nominated	
Mr. and Mrs. Ramachari	4th South Indian International Movie Awards	Best Lyricist for "Yaaralli"	Nominated	
Mr. and Mrs. Ramachari	1st IIFA Utsavam	Best Director	Nominated	
Mr. and Mrs. Ramachari	1st IIFA Utsavam	Best Lyricist for "Yaaralli"	Nominated	
Raajakumara	2017 Karnataka State Film Awards	Best Family Entertainer	Won	
Raajakumara	65th Filmfare Awards South	Best Director	Nominated	
Raajakumara	65th Filmfare Awards South	Best Lyricist For "Bombe Heluthaithe"	Nominated	
Raajakumara	Zee Kannada Hemmeya Kannadiga Award 2018	Hemmeya Nirdeshaka (Proud director)	Won	
Raajakumara	7th South Indian International Movie Awards	Best Director	Won	
Raajakumara	7th South Indian International Movie Awards	Best Lyricist for "Bombe Heluthaithe"	Won	
