= Family Power =

Reality television show

- Genre: Reality show
- Presented by: Puneeth Rajkumar
- Starring: Puneeth Rajkumar
- Country of origin: India
- Original language: Kannada
- No. of seasons: 1
- No. of episodes: 42

Production
- Production locations: Karnataka, India

Original release
- Network: Colors Kannada
- Release: 25 November 2017 – 8 April 2018

Family Power is an Indian reality television family game show, which aired on Colors Kannada from 25 November 2017 to April 2018. It was hosted by Puneeth Rajkumar. The show's prize money was Rs.10 lakh. The funds raised in the final episode was used on Cochlear implant for children suffering from hearing loss. The show was produced by Pixel Pictures Private Limited.
