= Maurya (film) =

2004 Kannada language sports drama film

- Film poster
- Directed by: S. Narayan
- Written by: Puri Jagannadh
- Based on: Amma Nanna O Tamila Ammayi by Puri Jagannadh
- Produced by: Rockline Venkatesh
- Starring: Puneeth Rajkumar; Roja Selvamani
- Cinematography: P. K. H. Das
- Edited by: P. R. Sounder Raj
- Music by: Gurukiran
- Distributed by: Rockline Productions
- Release date: 22 October 2004
- Running time: 162 minutes
- Country: India
- Language: Kannada

Maurya is a 2004 Kannada language sports drama film directed by S. Narayan. The film starred Puneeth Rajkumar, Roja Selvamani and Meera Jasmine in lead roles. This film is produced by Rockline Venkatesh. It is the remake of 2003 Telugu movie, Amma Nanna O Tamila Ammayi.

== Plot ==
Manu's entire life is about his mother, Meena, a college lecturer. They live together in Bangalore. When Manu was a child, he was separated from his father/Meena's husband, Prathap. Manu is a passionate and great kick-boxer. He later meets Alamelu "Andhra", a Telugu girl from Andhra Pradesh and starts to fall in love with her. Manu's happy life is suddenly jolted, when kidnaps here Meena, dies of a heart attack. On her deathbed, an hospital Meena tells Manu to meet Prathap, who was a kickboxing champion that won the championship six times in a row and is presently a kickboxing coach. Manu reluctantly accepts.

When Manu meets Prathap, he learns that he has another wife and a daughter, and is happily settled with them. However, Manu gets a job as a janitor and juice provider at his father's kickboxing academy. Anand is Prathap's best student, and he is sure that Anand will win the championship. Later, Manu finds out that Anand had impregnated his step-sister and abandoned her, and also abandons Prathap by getting another master and other sponsors. Prathap is attacked by several of Anand's sponsors; Manu later, who an enraged beats them up, making Prathap learn that Manu is a great kick-boxer. Prathap also finds out that Manu was also participating in the kick-boxing championship. The rest of the story is about how Prathap trains Manu to win the championship.

== Cast ==
- Puneeth Rajkumar as Manu
- Meera Jasmine as Alamelu
- Devaraj as Prathap, Manu's father
- Roja as Meena, Manu's mother
- Komal as Manu's friend
- Doddanna as broker
- Rekha Kumar
- Mandya Jayaram
- Shobaraj as Prathap's old boxing coach
- Jaidev as Anand
- Maithreyi Karthik
- R. G. Vijayasarathy as Alamelu's father
- Sundar Raj
- Ashok as college bully's father
- Jayalakshmi
- Kote Prabhakar
- Mukhyamantri Chandru
- Yathi Raj
- Aiyappa M.M
- V. K. Mohan
- Bank Suresh
- Bhanu Prakash
- Sridhar Raj
- Venkatesh Prasad

== Production ==
A song was picturised at Chikmagalur.

== Soundtrack ==
Maurya

Soundtrack album by Gurukiran
- Released: 22 September 2004
- Genre: Feature film soundtrack
- Length: 24:58
- Language: Kannada
- Label: Anand Audio
- Producer: Gurukiran

Gurukiran chronology
Omkara (2004)	Maurya (2004)	Rishi (2005)
External audio
- Official Audio Jukebox on YouTube

The music of the film was composed by Gurukiran.

Track list
No.	Title	Lyrics	Singer(s)	Length
1.	"Amma Amma I Love You"	S. Narayan	Shaan	4:14
2.	"Haadali Karunaadali"	V. Manohar	Udit Narayan, Lakshmi Nataraj	4:04
3.	"Machchalli Kochodalli"	Upendra	Puneeth Rajkumar	4:29
4.	"Pilla Pilla"	S. Narayan	Udit Narayan, Chaitra H. G.	3:49
5.	"Simplallagi Helteen Kele"	S. Narayan	Puneeth Rajkumar	3:57
6.	"Usiraguve Hasiraguve"	K. Kalyan	Srinivas, Shreya Ghoshal	4:22
Total length:				24:47

== Reception ==
S. N. Deepak of Deccan Herald felt the film had "all essential ingredients like sentiments, action, romance and comedy" to make it "appealing." He added, "Cinematography is good. Dialogues, written by S Narayan, are catchy." Of the acting performances, he wrote, "Meera Jasmine, as an innocent Telugu speaking girl, has put in a good effort. Devaraj and Roja, as parents, suit their roles well", and praise the music on the film. Chitraloka wrote "Compared to earlier three films of Puneeth Rajkumar this one is brisk, gripping and intelligently made even though the film is a remake of Telugu blockbuster ‘Amma Naanna Oh Tamil Ammayyi’. There is some exotic location, fine comedy and cozy atmosphere for family audience". Sify wrote "Heavy sentiments and action scenes are the highlights of this wholesome family entertainer. Ace director S.Narayan has remade the film (Amma Naana O’ Tamil Ammayi and M.Kumaran son of Mahalakshmi in Telugu and Tamil respectively) but takes the credit for screenplay which he is not supposed to take".

== Box office ==
The film was commercial successfully ran more than 100 days in 16 centers of Karnataka and was the fourth continuous 100-day run of a film for Puneeth Rajkumar.
