= Yuvarathnaa =

2021 film by Santhosh Ananddram

Yuvarathna
- Theatrical release poster
- Directed by: Santhosh Ananddram
- Written by: Santhosh Ananddram
- Produced by: Vijay Kiragandur
- Starring: Puneeth Rajkumar; Sayyeshaa; Dhananjay; Prakash Raj; Diganth; Saikumar
- Cinematography: Venkatesh Anguraj
- Edited by: Jnaanesh B. Matad
- Music by: S. Thaman
- Production company: Hombale Films
- Release date: 1 April 2021
- Running time: 161 minutes
- Country: India
- Language: Kannada
- Box office: ₹32.41 crores

Yuvarathnaa (transl. Gem of youth) is a 2021 Indian Kannada-language action drama film directed by Santhosh Ananddram and produced by Vijay Kiragandur under the banner of Hombale Films. The film stars Puneeth Rajkumar, Sayyeshaa, Dhananjay, Prakash Raj, Diganth and P. Sai Kumar. The music was composed by S. Thaman, while the cinematography and editing was handled by A. Venkatesh and Jnaanesh B. Matad respectively.

Yuvarathnaa was released on 1 April 2021 to positive reviews from critics and became a commercial success at the box office.

== Plot ==
Sameera, a student at RK University, commits suicide after failing her CUET exam despite being a brilliant student. Gurudev Deshmukh, the principal of RK university and Sameera's teacher, is distraught and files a petition against private colleges for depriving public institutions of funds and declining opportunities to bright students who studied in Government Colleges with the support of Samarth Bhagwath, Gurudev's former student and Bangalore DC, and Education Minister Raghav Reddy. Antony Joseph, who runs the private colleges for his benefits, retaliates by sending gangsters across the state to stop the petition, but is warned and thrashed by Arjun, a student leader.

Arjun gets kicked out for going against the college; he gets himself admitted into RK university as a student only to learn that Antony Joseph has sent goons, disguised as students as they want to ruin the students by disrupting their studies using harassment and drug supply. Vandana, a medical lecturer at the university, suspects Arjun when she witnesses him packing drugs and keeping them in library books. Arjun runs into a mysterious person, who recognizes him and his intentions. Arjun takes the mysterious person's place and meets Antony and his gang, where he finds that Raghava Reddy and the university's Vice Principal Jayapal are in cahoots with Antony Joseph.

The duo were actually responsible for Sameera's suicide and were posing as Gurudev's ally. The mysterious person was actually a hitman, who was hired by Raghav Reddy to assassinate Gurudev. However, Arjun foils their attempt and it is then revealed he was supplying anti-drug medicines to cure the students with the help of the university's librarian Govind. Gurudev arrives at the college and checks Arjun's file after Arjun disturbs the college premises by thrashing the goons. Gurudev is shocked to see Arjun's file, where it is revealed that Arjun is actually Yuvaraj, an intelligent student with anger management issues.

Yuva was expelled 12 years back for manhandling a lecturer. Yuva reveals the truth to Gurudev, who expels Jayapal from the college. Gurudev learns from Govind that Yuva had thrashed the lecturer as he was about to assault a female student. Govind reveals that Yuva is actually a renowned professor. Gurudev apologizes to Yuva and appoints him as a professor of the university. As the professor, Yuva cleverly motivates his students and encourages them to take more control of their education and follow their dreams. Antony Joseph makes various attempts to make the college fail the reopening standards. After an incident where the kabaddi team's glucose is swapped for illegal chemicals which causes the college's disqualification from the Kabaddi tournament, Yuva realizes that Samarth is also in cahoots with Antony, who was sent as an informant to provide information.

With Samarth exposed, Antony Joseph and his gang conspire to disrupt the exams. Realizing their plan, Yuva patrols the college and stops various goons posing as exam invigilators from impeding the students. Despite some attempts, the exams proceed peacefully. Samarth realizes his mistakes and confesses Raghav Reddy and Antony Joseph's activities to Yuva and Samrat's common friend Inspector Azad, leading to Raghav Reddy and Antony Joseph getting arrested for their crimes. The students' results are announced and everyone passes the exams with flying colors and celebrates. Yuva, along with other students, are celebrating RK university's 50 year celebration, where Gurudev hands over the prize of honor Yuvarathnaa to Yuva.

== Cast ==
- Puneeth Rajkumar as Arjun/ Yuvaraj
- Sayyeshaa as Dr. Vandhana
- Dhananjay as Antony Joseph
- Prakash Raj as Gurudev Deshmukh
- Diganth as Samarth Baghwath
- Sai Kumar as Raghav Reddy
- Sonu Gowda as a lawyer
- Vishal Hegde as a journalist
- Tarak Ponnappa as Azad
- Rajesh Nataranga as a professor
- Chi. Guru Dutt as a professor
- Sudharani as a professor
- Rangayana Raghu as a staff
- Sadhu Kokila as Dr. Kokila Raman
- Achyuth Kumar as Govind
- Prakash Belawadi as Shatrughan Salimath
- Avinash as Jayapal
- Triveni Rao as a squad member
- Arun Gowda
- Nagabhushana as a doctor
- Ravishankar Gowda as a professor
- John Kokken
- Kuri Prathap as peon
- Aruna Balraj
- Yamuna Srinidhi
- Ravi Bhat
- Usha Bhandary
- Sundar
- Veena Sundar
- Shankar Bhat
- Rockline Sudhakar
- Prakash Thuminad
- Shankar Ashwath
- Venkatesh Adiga
- Jennifer Antony
- Chitkala Biradar
- K V Nagaraja Murthy
- Sundeep Malani

=== Cameo appearance ===
- Lohithaswa
- B. Jayashree
- Nagathihalli Chandrasekhar
- Kavya Shetty in the song "Feel the Power"

== Production ==
=== Development ===
Puneeth Rajkumar was reported to sign his next film with Santhosh Ananddram, after completing the production works of his film Natasaarvabhowma (2019). The film marks the second collaboration between Puneeth Rajkumar and Ananddram after Raajakumara (2017). Vijay Kiragandur of Hombale Films was reported to produce the film after working on the duo's previous flick. On 10 October 2018, the makers announced that the film's title will be launched by one of his lucky fans, and also stated that the team might consider using a title from Rajkumar’s 200-odd films, but might contain a new element. On 23 October 2018, Puneeth Raajkumar took to Instagram to announce that the entire Raajakumara team (which consists of Puneeth Rajkumar, Ananddram, music composer V. Harikrishna and Hombale Films) will be joining this project. An event to launch the film's title was held at the Cauvery Theatre in Bangalore on 1 November 2018 (Kannada Rajyotsava), where the title was revealed to be Yuvarathnaa. According to reports, Puneeth Rajkumar would play a college student in the film, for which he lost weight.

=== Casting ===
On 1 December 2018, the team hosted auditions for budding actors and actresses to feature in the film. The makers reported that around 200 new talents were auditioned and shortlisted. Initially, Tamannaah was set to play the female lead, which would have been her full-fledged Kannada debut after appearing in item numbers in Jaguar (2016) and K.G.F: Chapter 1 (2019); however it was later reported that Tamil actress Sayyeshaa was confirmed for the role. Dhananjay and Vasishta N. Simha were roped in for the film, appearing in negative roles. Arun Gowda was reported to be cast in the film. Veteran Tamil actress Radhika Sarathkumar joined the cast in March 2019, marking her comeback in Kannada film industry after 32 years. Her last appearance in a Kannada film was in the 1987 film Sathyam Shivam Sundaram; however, she did not appear in the final cut of the film. Boman Irani was reported to play a pivotal role in the film, making his debut in Kannada.

Prominent filmmaker Bhagavan made his acting debut in the film, alongside bodybuilder Mamatha Sanathkumar who made her Kannada debut. Triveni Rao confirmed her presence in the film in June 2019. In July 2019, Prakash Raj and Diganth joined the film's cast. Diganth's role was revealed to be a deputy commissioner in the film. The very same month, Sonu Gowda also joined the cast of the film. On 9 December 2019, Pavan, son of Kannada filmmaker Narayan, joined the sets of the film.

Composer V. Harikrishna opted out of the project citing schedule conflicts and was replaced by Thaman S as the music director. Dhilip Subbarayan, who choreographed the action sequences in Saaho (2019), was roped in as the action director.

=== Filming ===
The film had a formal launch in the presence of its cast and crew on 12 December 2018. The principal photography of the film began on 14 February 2019 in Dharwad, and wrapped up within six days. The film's second schedule started in Maharaja's College in Mysore in late February. The third schedule of the film kickstarted on 22 March. During the intermediate schedule on 8 April 2019, Puneeth's elder brother Raghavendra Rajkumar visited the sets. After a long break, the team resumed the fifth schedule of shoot in Dharwad in June 2019.

It was reported that the team may kickstart the song shoot before November 2019. On 1 February 2020, Santhosh Ananddram tweeted about the song shoot choreographed by Jani Master. In late February, sources reported that two songs will be filmed in Europe, from late February to early March 2020. Amidst a coronavirus scare, the makers decided to shoot the songs in Austria and Slovenia. Due to the COVID-19 pandemic, the makers called off the overseas shooting schedules, and the film's shoot was further affected by pandemic-related restrictions.

On 26 September 2020, Puneeth Rajkumar and his team resumed the final schedule for two songs in India. On 12 October 2020, the team announced that they have wrapped the shoot of the film.

== Soundtrack ==
The music was composed by S. Thaman in his third collaboration with Puneeth Rajkumar in Power (2014) and Chakravyuha (2016). Yuvarathnaa marks Thaman's first collaboration with Santhosh Ananddram, replacing his regular collaborator V. Harikrishna for his films Mr. and Mrs. Ramachari (2014) and Raajakumara (2017).

== Release ==
=== Theatrical ===
Yuvarathnaa was originally slated to release on 7 October 2019, during the eve of Dussehra. However, the delay in the post-production works of the film made the makers postpone its release to December 2019, later to January 2020. In late December, the makers announced that the film will be released on 3 April 2020, but the makers announced that the film's release will be rescheduled for 8 May 2020, which was further postponed due to the COVID-19 pandemic in India.

In November 2020, the makers announced that film will also be released in Kannada, along with the dubbed versions of Telugu, Tamil and Hindi languages. On the occasion of New Year's Day, the makers announced new theatrical release dates of 1 April 2021 in India, 31 March 2021 in USA and 10 April 2021 in Singapore.

=== Home media ===
The film, along with its dubbed versions, was made available to stream a week later through Amazon Prime Video on 9 April 2021 due to the COVID-19 restrictions in Karnataka and was telecasted on Udaya TV on 14 January 2022, during the eve of Makara Sankranthi.

== Reception ==
Sunayana Suresh of The Times of India gave 3.5/5 stars and wrote "Yuvarathnaa, like Raajakumara, is a tale about human values. This time, though, the backdrop is of a college campus. For those who like their masala entertainers, this one will not disappoint." Sanjith Sridharan of OTTplay gave 3.5/5 stars and wrote "An all-out mass-entertainer that has Puneeth Rajkumar in top form and also delivers a message without being too preachy."

Vivek M. V. of Deccan Herald gave 3/5 stars and wrote "‘Yuvarathnaa’ is an unapologetic and sporadically entertaining star-vehicle." Manoj Kumar. R of The Indian Express gave 2.5/5 stars and wrote "The film may be a star vehicle for Puneeth Rajkumar, but it has its moments."

Karthik Keramalu of Film Companion wrote "Yuvarathnaa is not great by any record, but it manages to pass the test. It keeps the action alive even after it runs out of surprises to throw." A. Sharadhaa of The New Indian Express wrote "Overall, the director has delivered a strong message about the importance of good education, while also churning out a mainstream entertainer that can reach the masses."

== Accolades ==
Award	Category	Recipient	Result	Ref.
10th South Indian International Movie Awards
10th South Indian International Movie Awards	Best Film	Vijay Kiragandur	Nominated	
10th South Indian International Movie Awards	Best Actor	Puneeth Rajkumar	Won	
10th South Indian International Movie Awards	Best Actress in a Supporting Role	Sonu Gowda	Nominated	
10th South Indian International Movie Awards	Best Actor in a Negative Role	Dhananjay	Nominated	
10th South Indian International Movie Awards	Best Music Director	S. Thaman	Nominated	
10th South Indian International Movie Awards	Best Male Playback Singer	Armaan Malik, S. Thaman ("Neenade Naa")	Won	
10th South Indian International Movie Awards	Best Female Playback Singer	Ramya Behara ("Oorigobba Raja")	Nominated	
Filmfare Awards South	Best Choreography	Jani Master ("Feel the Power")	Won	
