= Mr & Mrs Ramachari =

2014 Indian film by Santhosh Ananddram

- Film poster
- Directed by: Santhosh Ananddram
- Screenplay by: Santhosh Ananddram; Vijay Naagendra
- Story by: Santosh Ananddram
- Produced by: Bandhavya R
- Starring: Yash; Radhika Pandit
- Cinematography: Vaidy S
- Edited by: K. M. Prakash
- Music by: V. Harikrishna
- Production company: Jayanna Combines
- Distributed by: Jayanna Combines
- Release date: 25 December 2014
- Running time: 160 minutes
- Country: India
- Language: Kannada
- Budget: ₹8 crore
- Box office: est. ₹50 crore

Mr & Mrs Ramachari is a 2014 Indian Kannada-language romantic drama film written and directed by Santhosh Ananddram and produced by Jayanna-Bhogendra under Jayanna Combines. It stars Yash and Radhika Pandit, alongside Srinath, Achyuth Kumar and Malavika Avinash. The story revolves around the love story of Ramachari, a tearaway, hot-headed youngster and a diehard fan of Vishnuvardhan, and Divya, a sophisticated young girl.

The film was announced in September 2013; filming commenced in April 2014 and ended in September 2014. It was shot primarily in Bangalore and Mysore, and significant portions were filmed in Chitradurga. The music was composed by V. Harikrishna, while the cinematography and editing were handled by Vaidy S and K. M. Prakash respectively.

Mr & Mrs Ramachari was a commercial success, completing a 200-day theatrical run and emerged the highest grossing Kannada film of the year. It was Yash's fifth consecutive success. The film won multiple awards at the Filmfare Awards South and SIIMA Awards. The Tamil remake rights of the film were bought by Escape Artists Motion Pictures in 2015. It was remade in Marathi in 2016 as Mr. & Mrs. Sadachari and in Odia in 2018 as Shakti thereby becoming the fifth Kannada film to be remade into two non-Hindi non-South Indian languages after Anuraga Aralithu, Appu, Mungaru Male and Milana.

== Plot ==
Ramachari is a short-tempered college student, who is a die-hard fan of Vishnuvardhan from his childhood, often watching his films. He gets inspired by the character Ramachari portrayed by Vishnuvardhan in Naagarahaavu and due to his waywardness, his relationship with his father Shankar is damaged to an extent where the father and son cannot stand each other. His father favours his elder son Hari, who is the ideal son, according to Shankar.

Ramachari hardly attends college and mostly hangs out with his friends Dattu and Chikkappa, thus being resented by Dattu's mother Sudha. At college, Ramachari encounters Divya, who is a new student in college, being ragged by seniors. Unknown to Ramachari, Divya is Dattu's sister. Ramachari instantly falls in love with her and she too reciprocates. He prefers calling her Margaret (based on actress Shubha's character in Naagarahaavu). The newfound love is sweet for Divya and Ramachari and they make a hot-headed decision to get married. But, they face problems with their relationship, which leads to a painful breakup.

Ramachari agrees to marry a girl Geetha of Shankar's choice to save his honor, and on hearing this, Divya attempts suicide. Later, Divya seemingly overcomes her hurt and agrees to marry Aakash, who is Sudha's choice. Both marriages are set on the same date and in the same town of Chitradurga. Both weddings are managed by a wedding planner, Manche Gowda, who mixes up the photos of the bride and groom, leading to confusing situations between both parties.

On the day of the wedding, Ramachari gets Geetha married to her boyfriend Farhan, by convincing Geetha's father Venkatesh with Shankar's help and performs a monologue by Vishnuvardhan's statue at Chitradurga fort. Divya learns of this and breaks her engagement with Aakash where she reunites with him.

== Cast ==
- Yash as Ramachari
- Radhika Pandit as Divya/ Margaret "Margie"
- Achyuth Kumar as Shankar, Ramachari's father
- Srinath as Venkatesh, Shankar's friend
- Malavika Avinash as Sudha, Divya's mother
- Vishal Hegde as Hari, Ramachari's brother, who escapes from home
- Ashok Sharma as Dattu, Divya's brother and Ramachari's friend
- Kaavya Sha as Geetha, Venkatesh's daughter
- Aruna Balraj as Girija, Ramachari's mother
- Ravi Bhat as Divya's father
- Srinivas Prabhu as college principal
- Saurav Lokesh as Ramachari's collegemate, who misbehaves with Divya
- Hemanth
- M. K. Mata
- Stunt Siddu
- Venkata Rao
- Chethan
- Honnavalli Krishna as Ramaiah, Constable
- Hemanth Srinivas as Young Ramachari
- Advithi & Ashvithi as Suvarna and Kasturi, Divya's friends
- Girish Shivanna as Chikappa, Ramachari and Dattu's friend
- Rockline Sudhakar
- Raghavendra. B. Kolar as Ramachari's friend
- Sadhu Kokila as Manche Gowda, marriage contractor
- Sangamesh Upase as Manche Gowda's assistant
- Mysore Naidu as inspector
- Dhyan as Akash, Divya's fiancee in a cameo appearance

== Production ==
=== Casting ===
It was revealed in September 2013, that the lead pair in the film would be Yash and Radhika Pandit. The film was their third together, after Moggina Manasu (2008) and Drama (2012). Sameer Dattani, in August 2014, said that he would be making a cameo appearance in the film.

=== Filming ===
The filming of Mr & Mrs Ramachari began in April 2014 in Bangalore. However, another report said, the film was shot in Goa in its first schedule before filming in Bangalore and Mysore. With the lead pair of Yash and Pandit playing the roles of college students in the film, the college scenes were filmed in Maharaja's College, Mysore. Team went on to shoot the climax portion in Chitradurga. Filming of a song sequence was underway with an allocated budget of ₹75 lakh (US$80,000) in October 2014. Part of a five-day schedule, filming resumed in Nelamangala, Bangalore Rural district, after having completed the first part at Minerva Mills in Bangalore. This was when heavy rains destroyed the set put up over a period of 20 days, costing the producer a loss of ₹40 lakh (US$43,000). Another song sequence for the film was then shot in Switzerland.

It was revealed that Ramachari, the character portrayed by Yash, in the film, is inspired by the character of the same name portrayed by Vishnuvardhan in his 1972 film Naagarahaavu. Yash, in the film, sports a tattoo of that character on his chest, played by Vishnuvardhan, and plays the role of a fan of the character. Speaking on this, the film's director said, "Just like the character of Ramachari in Naagarahaavu, our hero is a rebel and he is short-tempered. Moreover, he is a great fan of the Ramachari character itself and is inspired in life by it. He tries to lead a life similar to the character." Yash got the portrait of Ramachari tattooed on his chest on all days of filming, that took over an hour, done by Mayur, a Bangalore-based tattoo artist.

=== Marketing ===
The film's first look revealing the logo and the crew was released on 8 September 2014. The first promos of Mr. and Mrs. Ramachari were released on 15 September. To mark the occasion of late actor Vishnuvardhan's birth anniversary, the first teaser of the film was released on 17 September. The first look poster of the film's lead actors was released on 19 September. It featured Yash holding Pandit by his left arm and a snake by his right. The official film trailer was released on YouTube on 15 December 2014.

== Soundtrack ==
Mr & Mrs Ramachari
- Soundtrack cover

Soundtrack album by V. Harikrishna
- Released: November 2014
- Recorded: 2014
- Genre: Feature film soundtrack
- Length: 23:32
- Label: D Beats
- Producer: V. Harikrishna

V. Harikrishna composed the background score for the film and its soundtracks. The album consists of six soundtracks. The track "Annthamma" was sung by the male lead in the film Yash, who made his debut as a playback singer with the track. The track had been recorded in the voices of the composer V. Harikrishna and Vijay Prakash, before it was decided that Yash record it.

Track listing
No.	Title	Lyrics	Singer(s)	Length
1.	"Yaaralli"	Santhosh Ananddram	Ranjith	3:38
2.	"Mr & Mrs Ramachari"	A. P. Arjun	Tippu	3:56
3.	"Upavasa"	Ghouse Peer	Sonu Nigam, Shreya Ghoshal	4:05
4.	"Yenappa"	Ghouse Peer	Tippu	3:30
5.	"Kaarmoda"	Ghouse Peer	Rajesh Krishnan	4:10
6.	"Annthamma"	Yogaraj Bhat	Yash	4:13
Total length:				23:32

=== Reception ===
The album was received well by listeners of which over 15,000 was sold by mid-February 2015. It was also among the most downloaded albums on the internet at around 3 lakhs.

== Release and reception ==
The film was given the U certificate by the Regional Censor Board, without censoring any part of it. It was released theatrically on 25 December 2014 across Karnataka. Following good response at the domestic box-office, it was screened in the US, Germany and Ireland.

=== Critical reception ===
The film released theatrically on 25 December 2014, in over 200 theatres across Karnataka. G. S. Kumar of The Times of India reviewed the film gave the film a 3.5/5 rating and wrote that the film had a "neat plot, interspersed with lively sequences." Of the acting performances, he wrote, "Yash is brilliant, be it his expressions, dialogue delivery or style. Radhika Pandit delivers a winsome performance. Srinath, Achyuth Kumar, Malavika and Dhyan essay their roles with ease. Ashok Sharma shows promise of a good actor." He added crediting the film's music and cinematography. Writing for Bangalore Mirror, Shyam Prasad S. called the film "a visually appealing mass entertainer". He wrote praising the film's screenplay and the performances of all the actors, and its cinematography. A. Sharadhaa of The New Indian Express called the film "a family entertainer" and praised the film's screenplay, dialogues and the performances of Yash, Radhika Pandit, Achuyth Kumar, Malavika Avinash and Srinath. He concluded crediting the music, cinematography and editing in making the film "that works on many levels and is cheerful, romantic and emotional". S. Viswanath of Deccan Herald gave the film a rating of three out of five, and said the film was "Preachy and predictable". He wrote, "If only subtlety and sanity scored over predictable commercial claptrap, this Ramachari could have also risen to cult status of S R Puttanna Kanagal’s Naagarhaavu’s own eponymous hero." and added that it "condescends to clichéd contrivances".

=== Box office ===
The collections of the film took a hit following its release a week after the release of the then already successful Hindi film, PK. However, it collected ₹3 crore (US$320,000) on the day of its release, 25 December. At the end of its fifth day from release, it had collected ₹12 crore (US$1.3 million), making it one of the biggest openings for a Jayanna Combines film or a Yash film. Following a good run, the collections totalled to ₹23 crore (US$2.5 million) at the end of 15 days. It went on to complete its 100-day run on 3 April. Following a good response domestically, the film was released in the United States, where it collected ₹8 lakh (US$8,500). By the end of its 29-week run, the film completed 4,500 shows and by most reports, it earned a lifetime collection of around ₹50 crore (US$5.3 million). In the process, it became one of the highest-grossing film of Kannada cinema.

== Accolades ==
Award	Date of ceremony	Category	Recipient(s) and nominee(s)	Result	Ref(s)
Filmfare Awards South	26 June 2015	Best Film	Jayanna, Bhogendra	Won	
Filmfare Awards South	26 June 2015	Best Director	Santhosh Ananddram	Nominated	
Filmfare Awards South	26 June 2015	Best Actor	Yash	Won	
Filmfare Awards South	26 June 2015	Best Actress	Radhika Pandit	Nominated	
Filmfare Awards South	26 June 2015	Best Supporting Actress	Malavika Avinash	Nominated	
Filmfare Awards South	26 June 2015	Best Music Director	V. Harikrishna	Nominated	
Filmfare Awards South	26 June 2015	Best Male Playback Singer	Yash	Nominated	
Zee Kannada Music Awards	19 July 2015	Popular Album of the Year	Mr & Mrs Ramachari	Won	
Zee Kannada Music Awards	19 July 2015	Popular Song of the Year	"Annthamma"	Nominated	
South Indian International Movie Awards	6–7 August 2015	Best Film	Jayanna Combines	Won	
South Indian International Movie Awards	6–7 August 2015	Best Director	Santhosh Ananddram	Won	
South Indian International Movie Awards	6–7 August 2015	Best Debutant Director	Santhosh Ananddram	Nominated	
South Indian International Movie Awards	6–7 August 2015	Best Actor	Yash	Won	
South Indian International Movie Awards	6–7 August 2015	Best Actress	Radhika Pandit	Won	
South Indian International Movie Awards	6–7 August 2015	Best Actor in a Supporting Role (Male)	Achyuth Kumar	Won	
South Indian International Movie Awards	6–7 August 2015	Best Actor in a Supporting Role (Female)	Kaavya Sha	Nominated	
South Indian International Movie Awards	6–7 August 2015	Best Comedian	Sadhu Kokila	Nominated	
South Indian International Movie Awards	6–7 August 2015	Best Music Director	V. Harikrishna	Won	
South Indian International Movie Awards	6–7 August 2015	Best Playback Singer (Male)	Rajesh Krishnan "Kaarmoda"	Won	
South Indian International Movie Awards	6–7 August 2015	Best Lyricist	Santhosh Ananddram "Yaaralli"	Nominated	
South Indian International Movie Awards	6–7 August 2015	Best Lyricist	Ghouse Peer "Kaarmoda"	Won	
South Indian International Movie Awards	6–7 August 2015	Best Cinematographer	Vaidy S.	Won	
South Indian International Movie Awards	6–7 August 2015	Best Dance Choreographer	Murali "Mr & Mrs Ramachari"	Won	
South Indian International Movie Awards	6–7 August 2015	Best Fight Choreographer	Ravi Verma	Won	
IIFA Utsavam	25 January 2016	Best Picture	Jayanna Combines	Nominated	
IIFA Utsavam	25 January 2016	Best Director	Santhosh Ananddram	Nominated	
IIFA Utsavam	25 January 2016	Best Performance In A Leading Role – Male	Yash	Won	
IIFA Utsavam	25 January 2016	Best Performance In A Leading Role – Female	Radhika Pandit	Won	
IIFA Utsavam	25 January 2016	Best Performance In A Supporting Role – Male	Achyuth Kumar	Nominated	
IIFA Utsavam	25 January 2016	Best Performance In A Supporting Role – Female	Malavika Avinash	Nominated	
IIFA Utsavam	25 January 2016	Best Performance In A Comic Role	Sadhu Kokila	Won	
IIFA Utsavam	25 January 2016	Best Music Direction	V. Harikrishna	Nominated	
IIFA Utsavam	25 January 2016	Best Lyrics	Santhosh Ananddram (for "Yaaralli")	Nominated	
IIFA Utsavam	25 January 2016	Best Playback Singer - Female	Shreya Ghoshal (for "Upavaasa")	Won	
