= Vasantha Geetha =

- Poster
- Directed by: Dorai–Bhagavan
- Written by: Chi. Udaya Shankar
- Produced by: S. A. Govinda Raju; V. Bharath Raj
- Starring: Rajkumar; Gayathri; Leelavathi
- Cinematography: R. Chittibabu
- Edited by: P. Bhaktavatsalam
- Music by: M. Ranga Rao
- Production company: Nirupama Art Combines
- Release date: 1980
- Running time: 161 minutes
- Country: India
- Language: Kannada

Vasantha Geetha is a 1980 Indian Kannada-language romantic drama film, directed by the Dorai–Bhagavan duo. The film stars Dr. Rajkumar, Gayathri and Master Lohith.

The story, lyrics and screenplay were written by Chi. Udaya Shankar. The movie saw a theatrical run of 25 weeks.

A portion of the song Kannalle Eno from this movie was re-used in the title track of the 2010 movie Jackie.

Co-director Bhagavan had revealed that he was so impressed by an Iranian film which he saw at an international film festival at New Delhi that he used the core plot of that film as a reference point for the storyline of this film. Critics have noted that Chi. Udayashankar had penned the story inspired by the movie Model Love which he had seen at an international film festival in Bangalore. Similarities have also been noted with Avery Corman's 1977 novel Kramer versus Kramer which was adapted into a film of the same name (1979), released 9 months before this film.

== Plot ==
Vasanth, a private insurance agent, who works on commission, struggles to make a living with the meagre commission he makes. Unable to pay the rent on time, he gets thrown out of his rented house. He seeks the help of his close friend Ramu's family and resides with them. One day, he happens to meet a rich businessman’s arrogant daughter Geeta. Vasanth chides her and says it is goodwill and humble nature that wins people and not her arrogance. He makes a good impression on Geeta's dad, Seshadri, by returning her lost purse. In return Seshadri invites him to a party where Vasanth makes good contacts and grows his insurance business. A transformed Geeta has now fallen in love with Vasanth and proposes to marry him to which her father disapproves. However, the two end up marrying and begin leading their independent life in a small house. They eventually have a son, Shyam.

Meanwhile, Ramu gets severely sick and needs urgent care and help. Vasanth helps him get admitted to a hospital with specialist care, and is taken to Bangalore for a surgery, without the former's family's knowledge. However, Geeta's maid servant has seen this and informs Geeta, who misinterprets it as an extra-marital affair of her husband. Geeta confronts him upon his return and an irritated Vasanth slaps her, before hurrying to check on his friend. Geeta quits on Vasanth and moves to her father's house and plans for a divorce.

A while later, Ramu is shown recovering from his illness and is advised some rest for complete recovery. Vasanth returns home and realizes that his wife and son have left him and moved to his father-in-law's house. He begins to miss his son, and ends up taking him home from school. His wife lodges a kidnapping case on him and has his photo published in the newspapers. Upon seeing this, Ramu reaches out to Geeta and explains the details of all that transpired. Geeta and her father realize their mistake and ask for forgiveness from Vasanth, who is happy to forgive them.

== Cast ==
- Rajkumar as Vasantha
- Gayathri as Geetha (Voice dubbed by B. Jayashree)
- Puneeth Rajkumar as Shyam
- K. S. Ashwath as Seshadri
- Srinivasa Murthy as Ramu
- Leelavathi as Lakshmi
- Sampath (actor)
- Thoogudeepa Srinivas as Vishwanath
- Prabhakar as Narahari

== Soundtrack ==
The music was composed by M. Ranga Rao, with lyrics by Chi. Udaya Shankar. All the songs composed for the film were received extremely well and considered as evergreen songs. A portion of the song Kannalle Eno from this movie was re-used in the title track of the 2010 movie Jackie.

All lyrics are written by Chi. Udaya Shankar.

Track listing
No.	Title	Singer(s)	Length
1.	"Kannalle Eno"	Rajkumar	04:30
2.	"Aataveno Notaveno"	Rajkumar, Vani Jairam	04:16
3.	"Haayada Ee Sanje"	Rajkumar, S. Janaki	04:14
4.	"Neenado Mathella Chanda"	Rajkumar	04:26
