= Karnataka Ratna =

Karnataka Ratna Award
- ಕರ್ನಾಟಕ ರತ್ನ ಪ್ರಶಸ್ತಿ
- Awarded for: Highest civilian honour of Karnataka
- Sponsored by: Government of Karnataka
- Established: 1992 (34 years ago)
- First award: 1992
- Most recent winner(s): 2025: B. Saroja Devi; Vishnuvardhan

Highlights
- Total awarded: 12
- First winner(s): Kuvempu; Rajkumar

The Karnataka Ratna is the highest civilian honour of the State of Karnataka, India. It is awarded in recognition of a person's extraordinary contribution in any field. It was instituted in 1992 by the Government of Karnataka, which was then led by Chief Minister S. Bangarappa. A total of twelve persons have received this award. Posthumously, B. Saroja Devi became the first women to be awarded the Karnataka Ratna.

== The award ==
The Award comes with a gold medal weighing 50 gm, a citation, a memento and a shawl.

== List of recipients ==
Year	Recipient (birth–death)	Image	Field	Notes
1992	Kuvempu (1904–1994)		Literature	
1992	Dr. Rajkumar (1929–2006)		Cinema	
1999	S. Nijalingappa (1902–2000)		Politics	
2000	C. N. R. Rao (b. 1934)		Science	
2001	Devi Shetty (b.1953)		Medicine	
2005	Bhimsen Joshi (1922–2011)		Music	
2007	Shivakumara Swami (1907–2019)		Social service	
2008	Javare Gowda (1915–2016)		Education and literature	
2009	Veerendra Heggade (b. 1948)		Social service	
2022	Puneeth Rajkumar# (1975–2021) (Note: Puneeth Rajkumar died on 29 October 2021, at the age of 46.)		Cinema and social service	
2025	B. Saroja Devi# (1938–2025) (Note: B. Saroja Devi died on 14 July 2025, at the age of 87.)		Cinema	
2025	Dr. Vishnuvardhan# (1950–2009) (Note: Vishnuvardhan died on 30 December 2009, at the age of 59.)		Cinema	
