= Arasu (2007 film) =

2007 film by Mahesh Babu

Arrasu
- Theatrical film poster
- Directed by: Mahesh Babu
- Written by: M. S. Ramesh; R. Rajashekhar (Dialogues)
- Screenplay by: Janardhana Maharshi
- Story by: Janardhana Maharshi
- Produced by: Parvathamma Rajkumar
- Starring: Puneeth Rajkumar; Meera Jasmine; Ramya
- Cinematography: Ramesh Babu
- Edited by: S. Manohar
- Music by: Joshua Sridhar
- Production company: Poornima Enterprises
- Distributed by: Vajreshwari combines
- Release date: 25 January 2007
- Running time: 152 minutes
- Country: India
- Language: Kannada

Arrasu (Search/King) is a 2007 Indian Kannada-language romantic drama film directed by Mahesh Babu. It features Puneeth Rajkumar in the title role as the son of a business tycoon who leaves his inherited wealth to make a living on his own upon being rejected by a girl played by Ramya who he proposes to in marriage. When a middle-class girl played by Meera Jasmine enters their lives, it soon turns out to be a love triangle. Srinivasa Murthy, Komal and Adi Lokesh appear in supporting roles. Kannada film actors Darshan and Aditya made cameo appearance. Actress Shriya Saran also made a cameo appearance in the film, her first Kannada language film. The movie was dubbed in Hindi as Zinda Dili and in Marathi as Premachi Satva Pariksha.

== Plot ==
Shivaraj Arasu is an NRI from a wealthy family of businesspeople, yet he is wasting both his time and his family's money. His manager, Ramanna, advises him to return to India and take charge of their successful businesses. However, Arasu finds it hard to adjust to life in India after enjoying a lavish, carefree existence in America. He falls in love with Ramanna's daughter, Shruthi, and proposes to her. However, she criticises his spoilt lifestyle and challenges him to earn at least ₹5,000 a month independently before she will consider the proposal. She also makes a caustic remark about the company. Startled, Arasu quits the company and sets out to find a job.

Shivaraj is now homeless and penniless, really struggling to get by. Starving, he asks a hotel for a meal and is surprised by how low the prices are. However, he is thrown out when the hotelier does not believe his promise to repay him a hundredfold. He finds an old lady selling bananas. He tells her the same story, eats two bananas and promises her 200,000 rupees in a month's time. It is at this point that he meets a girl named Aishwarya. Shivaraj gains a good reputation by using his strength to protect her from a group of thugs. He also gets a job as a sales representative in the saree shop where she works. He moves into the small room that she shares. Taking pity on him, Aishwarya lets him stay at her house for a month. He sleeps on the floor, and his helpful behaviour towards the people in his neighbourhood earns him a good reputation. He owes a lot to Shruthi for her wise words that changed his lifestyle, and he is extremely grateful to Aishwarya for supporting him through life's hardships.

This month, Aishwarya has a huge crush on Shivaraj. Shruthi is also in love with him and ready to marry him. As it happens, Shruthi and Aishwarya are very good friends. Shivaraj is unaware that Aishwarya loves him, but she has told Shruthi, who is taken aback. After Aishwarya leaves, feeling sorry for Shivaraj, Shruthi asks for his forgiveness, which he grants. She then decides to give up her love for him for the sake of her friend. Similarly, knowing that Shruthi is ready to marry Shivaraj, Aishwarya also decides to sacrifice her love for him. Not knowing what to do, the intelligent Shivaraj takes a bold step. Without revealing his plan, he convinces them both to marry his friends, Vijay and Vinay, instead. In return, the friends arrange for Arpitha, another woman, to come to Shivaraj. As the film ends, she suddenly appears and confesses her love for him.

== Cast ==
- Puneeth Rajkumar as Shivaraj "Shivu" Aras
- Meera Jasmine as Aishwarya
- Ramya as Shruthi
- Srinivasa Murthy as Raamanna
- Komal as Daas
- Adi Lokesh as Manja
- Satyajith as hotelier
- P. N. Sathya as harassing financier
- Shankar Rao as saree shop owner
- K. Prakash Shenoy
- Sai Prakash
- Ashwath Narayan
- NGEF Ramamurthy
- Yathiraj as auto driver
- Kaddipudi Chandru as on-looker in hotel run by Satyajith
- Radhakrishna
- Renukamma Murugodu as fruits seller
- Veena
- Darshan as Vijay (Cameo appearance)
- Aditya as Vinay (Cameo appearance)
- Shriya Saran as Arpitha (Cameo appearance)

== Production ==
The film was launched at Dr. Rajkumar's residence.

== Soundtrack ==
Arasu

Soundtrack album by Joshua Sridhar
- Released: 14 December 2006
- Genre: Feature film soundtrack
External audio
- Official Audio Jukebox on YouTube

No.	Title	Lyrics	Singer(s)	Length
1.	"Baaro Baaro"	V. Nagendra Prasad	Puneeth Rajkumar, Suchitra
2.	"Eko Eno"	Ram Narayan	Mahalakshmi Iyer
3.	"Kannu Kannugalu Seri"	K. Kalyan	Harini Sudhakar, Karthik
4.	"Ninna Kandakshana"	Ram Narayan	Kunal Ganjawala
5.	"No Tension"	Kaviraj	Blaaze, Ranjith
6.	"Preethi Preethi"	Hamsalekha	K. S. Chitra, Karthik

== Reception ==
A critic from Sify wrote that "On the whole Arasu is watchable for its lead performers". A critic from Rediff.com wrote that "Arrasu is a neat family entertainer".

== Awards ==
Filmfare South Awards.

- Best Kannada Actor — Puneeth Rajkumar—Won
