= Puneeth Rajkumar =

Indian Kannada actor and film producer (1975–2021)

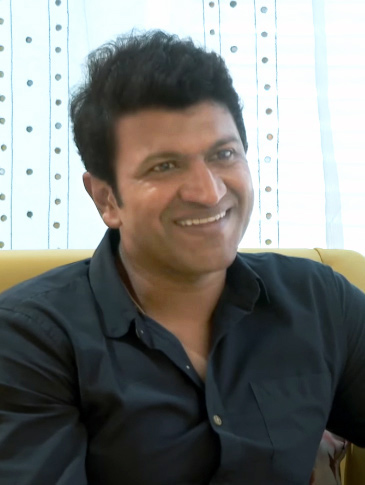
- Puneeth in 2021
- Born: Puneeth Rajkumar; 17 March 1975; Madras, Tamil Nadu, India
- Died: 29 October 2021 (age 46); Bengaluru, Karnataka, India
- Other names: Appu, Power Star,
- Occupations: Actor; singer; film producer; television presenter; philanthropist
- Years active: 1976–2021
- Spouse: Ashwini Revanth (m. 1999)
- Children: 2
- Parents: Dr. Rajkumar (father); Parvathamma Rajkumar (mother)
- Relatives: See Rajkumar family
- Awards: Full list
- Honours: Karnataka Ratna (2022) (posthumously)

Dr. Puneeth Rajkumar (17 March 1975 – October 29, 2021), also known as Appu, was an Indian actor, playback singer, film producer, television presenter and philanthropist who worked in Kannada cinema. He was the youngest son of legendary actor and matinee idol Dr. Rajkumar. He was one of the most popular actors in Kannada cinema. He appeared as a lead in 32 films. As a child, he appeared in many films. His performances as a child actor in Vasantha Geetha (1980), Bhagyavantha (1981), Chalisuva Modagalu (1982), Eradu Nakshatragalu (1983), Bhakta Prahaladha (1983), Yarivanu (1984) and Bettada Hoovu (1985) were praised. He won the National Film Award for Best Child Artist for his role of Ramu in Bettada Hoovu. He also won Karnataka State Award Best Child artist for Chalisuva Modagalu and Eradu Nakshatragalu. Puneeth's first lead role was in 2002's Appu. In a career spanning three decades, he has won one National Film Award, four Karnataka State Film Awards, six Filmfare Awards South and five SIIMA awards. He was conferred with the Doctorate by Mysuru University. The Karnataka Government conferred the state's highest civilian award, Karnataka Ratna, to Puneeth Rajkumar on 1 November 2022, posthumously.

Puneeth was nicknamed "Power Star" by media and fans. His films as an actor were primarily family dramas and action films but the films produced by him under the PRK Productions banner were of the comedy drama genre, with the theme of family relationships and conveying social messages. He appeared as a lead actor in many commercially successful films such as Appu (2002), Abhi (2003), Aakash (2005), Arasu (2007), Milana (2007), Vamshi (2008), Raam (2009), Jackie (2010), Hudugaru (2011), Power (2014), Raajakumara (2017), Natasaarvabhowma (2019), Yuvarathnaa (2021) and James (2022). His last silver screen appearance, the docu-drama Gandhada Gudi where he played himself, was released on 28 October 2022 coincidentally marking his first death anniversary. He was one of the most famous celebrities and one of the highest paid actors in Kannada cinema of his time. In 2012, he debuted as a television presenter on the game show Kannadada Kotyadhipati, a Kannada version of Who Wants to Be a Millionaire?. Post his eye donation, Narayana Nethralaya recorded 85,000 pledges within one year as against 65,000 pledges in 28 years.

== Personal life ==
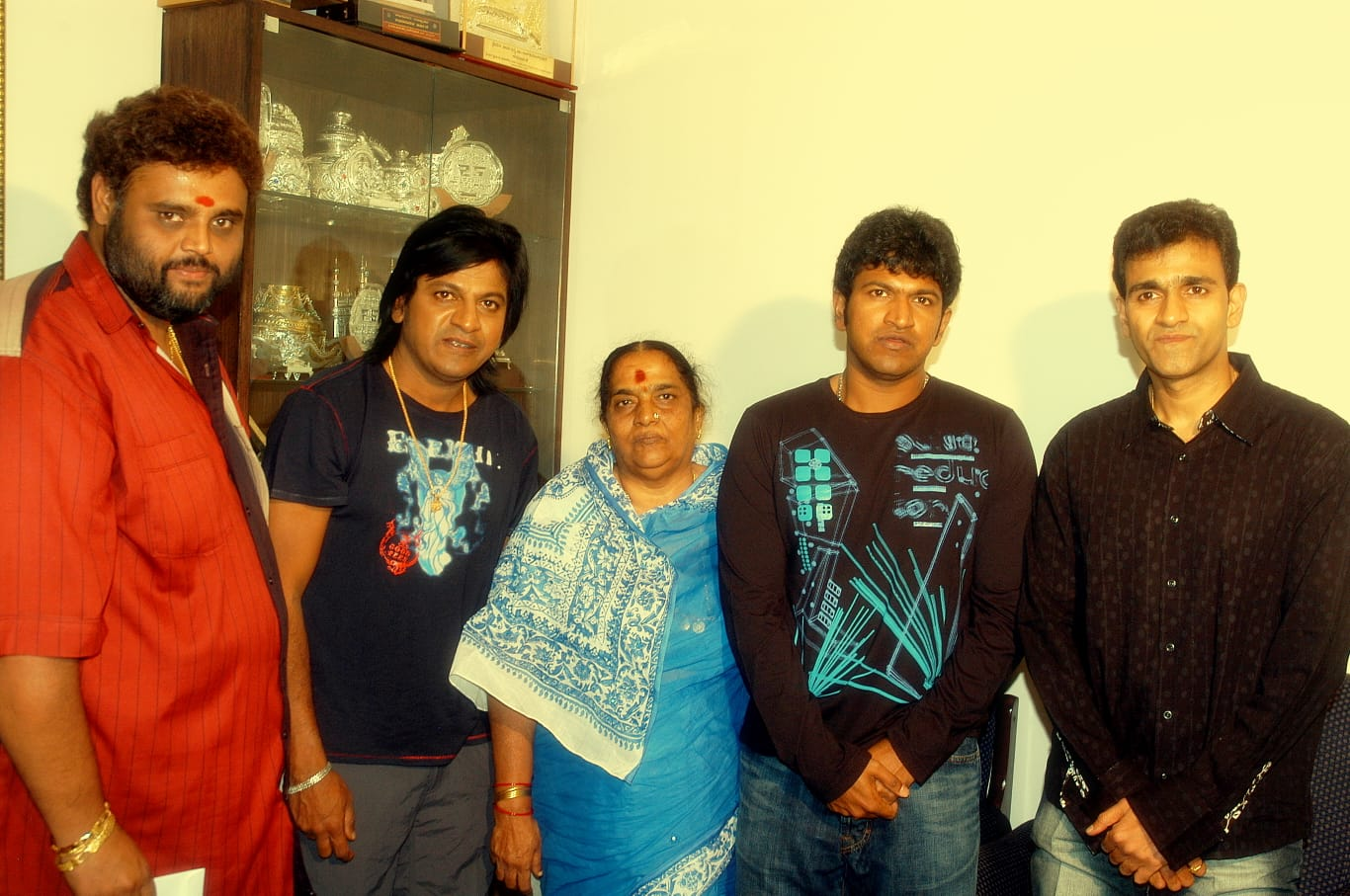
From (L to R) Ravi Srivatsa, Shiva Rajkumar, Parvathamma Rajkumar, Puneeth Rajkumar, Raghavendra Rajkumar

Puneeth (born Lohith) was born in Madras to the matinee idol Dr. Rajkumar and Parvathamma Rajkumar on 17 March 1975. He was their fifth and youngest child. When Puneeth was six years old, his family moved to Mysore. His father brought him and his sister Poornima to his film sets until he was ten years old. His elder brothers, Shiva Rajkumar and Raghavendra Rajkumar, are also professional actors. After appearing in films as a child actor in the 1970s and 1980s, Puneeth returned to studies and earned a diploma in computer science. He subsequently worked as a production manager in films before venturing into granite business which he described as unsuccessful. He designed clothes for his father's character for the film Jeevana Chaitra (1992).

Puneeth married Ashwini Revanth from Chikmagalur on 1 December 1999. They met through a common friend, and have two daughters.

== Acting career ==
=== 1976–1989: As child actor ===
Director V. Somashekar cast Puneeth (then known as Lohith) onscreen when he was six months old in his thriller film Premada Kanike (1976). This was followed by Vijay's Sanaadi Appanna (1977), based on Krishnamoorthy Puranik's novel of the same name, when Puneeth was one year old. Thayige Thakka Maga (1978) was again directed by V. Somashekar and starred his father. Two years later, directors Dorai–Bhagavan cast him as Shyam in Vasantha Geetha (1980). This was followed by K. S. L. Swamy's mythological drama Bhoomige Banda Bhagavantha (1981, appearing as Lord Krishna) and B. S. Ranga's Bhagyavantha (1982), in which he recorded his first popular song: "Baana Daariyalli Soorya", composed by T. G. Lingappa. That year, he appeared in two hit films (Chalisuva Modagalu and Hosa Belaku) with his father. For the former, Puneeth received his first Karnataka State Film Award for Best Child Actor (Male). In 1983, he appeared in two mythological films: Bhakta Prahlada as the protagonist, Prahlada, and Eradu Nakshatragalu, for which he received his second Karnataka State Film Award for Best Child Actor.

In 1984, Puneeth starred with Rajkumar in the thriller Yarivanu and sang "Kannige Kaanuva", written by Rajan–Nagendra. His biggest break as a child actor came in the 1985 drama Bettada Hoovu, directed by N. Lakshminarayan and based on Shirley L Arora's novel What Then, Raman? For his portrayal of the innocent Ramu, Puneeth received the award for Best Child Artist at the 33rd National Film Awards. In his early teens, he appeared in Shiva Mecchida Kannappa (1988) as the young Kannappa with his elder brother, Shiva. Puneeth's final child role was in Parashuram (1989), with his father.

In 1994, Puneeth began working as a manager in his family's production house. His first film as a manager was Geluvina Saradara (1996) starring Raghavendra.

=== 2002–2007: Debut as lead and breakthrough ===
In April 2002, Puneeth made his film debut as a leading man in the film Appu with actress, Rakshita also making her film debut. The musical by Gurukiran, directed by Puri Jagannadh and produced by Parvathamma Rajkumar, in which he played a college boy, was a box office success and critics praised his dancing skills. Puneeth sang "Taliban Alla Alla", with lyrics by Upendra and music by Gurukiran. The film's success spawned remakes in Telugu (Idiot (2002) and Tamil (Dum (2003).

Puneeth next appeared in Dinesh Babu's Abhi (2003) as a plucky college boy who is devoted to his mother. In the film, based on a true story and produced by Parvathamma Rajkumar, he starred with debutante Ramya.

Meher Ramesh's Veera Kannadiga was Puneeth's first 2004 release. The film, written by Puri Jagannadh, was simultaneously made in Telugu as Andhrawala with N. T. Rama Rao Jr. in the lead role. Paired with debutante Anitha, it showcased his dancing and stunt skills. Although the film was criticised for its violence and poor plot, it was successful at the box office. Puneeth next starred in S. Narayan's family drama Maurya, a remake of the Telugu Amma Nanna O Tamila Ammayi, starring Ravi Teja and written by Puri Jagannadh. The remake enhanced Puneeth's reputation as an actor in his own right.

He released two films in 2005. Mahesh Babu's Aakash reunited Puneeth with Ramya (from Abhi) and he appeared in Veera Shankar's action film Namma Basava, with Gowri Munjal. He recorded songs in both films. Puneeth's only 2006 release was Ajay, directed by Meher Ramesh and produced by Rockline Venkatesh. In the film, a remake of the 2003 Telugu Okkadu, he played a professional kabaddi player who protects a girl endangered by her uncle (played by Prakash Raj). As a result of these films, Puneeth was called the "Powerstar of Sandalwood".

Puneeth's first release in 2007 was his production Arasu, directed by Mahesh Babu, in which he played an expatriate businessman who renounces his wealth for the woman he loves. For his performance, he received his first Filmfare Best Actor award. Puneeth's other release that year was Prakash's reaffirmation of traditional family values Milana. Actress Parvathy made her debut into Kannada films with this film. Puneeth played the radio jockey Akash. For the film, he received his first Karnataka State Film Award for Best Actor.

=== 2008–2015: Commercial success ===
The actor released two films in 2008: D. Rajendra Babu's Bindaas and Prakash's Vamshi. Puneeth's first 2009 release was Raaj – The Showman. Although the film (directed by Prem) was criticised, his performance was praised. His other film Raam, with Priyamani, was a remake of the Telugu hit Ready.

Puneeth returned to the limelight in 2010 with back-to-back hits. The first was Jacob Varghese's political thriller Prithvi, in which he played a bureaucrat in Ballari district who fights corruption. His next release was the action film Jackie, directed by Duniya Soori, which was a commercial success. In 2011, Puneeth co-starred in K. Madesh's Hudugaru, a remake of the Tamil film Nadodigal in which he reprised M. Sasikumar's role in the original. For his performance, he received his second Filmfare and first SIIMA Best Actor awards. In Yogaraj Bhat's travelogue Paramathma, Puneeth's next release, his character searches for love.

He worked with Soori again in 2012 on the action film Anna Bond, produced by Parvathamma Rajkumar. For his performance, he received the Suvarna Best Actor award and was nominated for an IIFA award. Puneeth starred in another Tamil remake Poraali, filmed in Kannada as Yaare Koogadali, by Samuthirakani.

In 2014, Puneeth starred in Jayanth C. Paranjee's romance Ninnindale, with Erica Fernandes. Although his performance as a New York-based adventure enthusiast based in New York was praised by critics, the film was unsuccessful at the box office. Puneeth's next release was K. Madesh's Power***, a remake of the Telugu film Dookudu. Appearing with Trisha for the first time, he played a tough police officer. The film earned a record ₹22 crore (₹220 million) in six days. In 2015, he played himself in B. M. Giriraj's film Mythri, which also starred Mohanlal and Bhavana. Puneeth's other release that year was Pawan Wadeyar's Rana Vikrama, an action film with Adah Sharma and Anjali.

=== 2016–2022: Last films ===
In March 2016, Puneeth worked for M. Saravanan's Chakravyuha and Duniya Soori's Doddmane Hudga. In 2017, he appeared in Santhosh Ananddram's Raajakumara, which broke all records in box-office and became the highest-grossing Kannada-language film of all time beating previous record of Mungaru Male, before K.G.F: Chapter 1 (2018) surpassed it. Puneeth also had the starring role in A. Harsha's Anjani Putra (2017) alongside Rashmika Mandanna, and a voice role in Anup Bhandari's Rajaratha (2018). In 2019, Puneeth's only release, Natasaarvabhowma saw commercial success. His last film in a leading role, James, was posthumously released on what would have been Puneeth's 47th birthday, 17 March 2022. It broke the record for the biggest opening day collection, and was the fastest Kannada film to gross ₹100 crore.

== Popularity and other works ==
The sea of people, thronging that gave last respects to Puneeth Rajkumar, is testimony to his iconic status in the state. Over the last two decades, Puneeth Rajkumar grew from being an actor to an icon, much like his father, Dr Rajkumar. Puneeth had leveraged the influence he had to endorse many causes, refusing to take any remuneration for them.

Bangalore Metropolitan Transport Corporation (BMTC)

Puneeth Rajkumar had also agreed to be the brand ambassador for the Bangalore Metropolitan Transport Corporation (BMTC) in 2019. After his demise, many recalled how he had, true to his style, readily agreed to be the face of the state-run organisation and refused to take any money for the same. He had reportedly wanted to encourage people to use more public transportation. During his association with the organisation, he had actively endorsed several campaigns of the BMTC, including the Bus Priority Lane, Less Traffic Day and a campaign against harassment of women.

Brand ambassador for the state-run Karnataka Milk Federation (KMF)

Following in the footsteps of his late father Dr Rajkumar, Puneeth Rajkumar too donned the Karnataka Milk Federation (KMF) brand ambassador's cap without accepting any remuneration. In the 10 years that Puneeth endorsed KMF products, there was no actual agreement between him and the Federation. AS Premnath, former KMF MD, told The New Indian Express that Dr Rajkumar was the brand ambassador in the 1990s. "That was his first and last endorsement for any product, and it was advertised in newspapers and on Doordarshan. The legendary actor did not take money," he added. After Dr Rajkumar died in 2006, KMF did not have an ambassador for a few years. "In 2011, I met Puneeth and asked him if he could endorse KMF. He readily accepted," Premnath recalled. It was also an idea of then KMF chairman Somashekar Reddy.

Asked about remuneration, Puneeth had said, "When my father endorsed your products without taking a paisa, how can I demand money?" The actor endorsed Nandini Goodlife tetra packs in the first year. "When we told him the advertisement will be shot at a government school in a remote village near Devarayanadurga, he obliged. We shot the advertisement for three days.

He would reach the spot at 8.00 am and leave only at 6.00 pm. I remember him as a very down-to-earth person. He would sit with the children and have lunch," he recalled. "With just his endorsement, KMF products started seeing good sales. That was the power of Puneeth," he said.

Right to Education (RTE)

Education was a cause that was close to Puneeth Rajkumar and over decades, he worked in many ways to help those in need with the same. According to reports, he used to consistently sponsor the fees of thousands of students every year, and used to also financially assist many Kannada-medium schools in the state. In 2013, when the state government was finding several seats vacant in the Right to Education (RTE) quota, they roped in Puneeth and Radhika Pandit as brand ambassadors to spread awareness about the legislation through a series of newspaper and TV advertisements. As the brand ambassador for the Sarva Shiksha Abhiyan, he often appealed to parents to send their children to school and worked towards reducing drop-out rates in schools. He also had agreed to be the brand ambassador for the Skill Development Board. Speaking to the Times of India, Higher Education Minister CN Ashwatha Narayana said that Puneeth readily agreed to the proposal.

COVID-19 Pandemic

In times of crisis, Puneeth was often seen not just financially contributing to funds to help those in distress, but also urging his fans to do the same. When the COVID-19 pandemic struck India in 2020, Puneeth actively involved himself in creating awareness about safety. In a video by the Karnataka government, he was seen urging people to support the government in controlling the disease. In addition to this, Puneeth also donated Rs 50 lakh (circa 70 000 USD) to Chief Minister's Relief Fund in March 2020, amid the first wave of COVID-19 infections.

Puneeth was involved in philanthropy with his mother at the Shakti Dhama ashram in Mysore, and owned the Bengaluru Royals, Premier Futsal team.

=== Playback singing ===
Puneeth, just like his father, is one of very few actors who have excelled in professional singing too. He sang alone in Appu, and sang a duet on "Jothe Jotheyali" from Vamshi. He sang a fast number in Jackie and sang in his brother Shiva's films Lava Kusha and Mylari. Puneeth Rajkumar has sung a song "Kanna Sanne Indhalene" for Akira movie which was composed by B. Ajaneesh Loknath. He has revealed that his compensation for singing for other than his home-productions goes to charity and several orphanages and old age homes.

=== Television ===
In 2012, Puneeth hosted the first season of Kannadada Kotyadhipati, modelled on the Hindi show Kaun Banega Crorepati, which in turn, was modelled on the British show Who Wants to Be a Millionaire?. Its first season was successful and a second season followed. The success of second season was cited as a prime reason for Suvarna channel replacing Udaya TV from the top slot for the first time in 19 years. He again hosted the fourth season replacing Ramesh Aravind. He also went to be the host of Colors Kannada's reality show, Family Power. He was producing a serial Netravathi in Udaya TV.

=== Endorsements ===
Puneeth was a brand ambassador for Karnataka Milk Federation's Nandini Milk products, LED Bulb Project, 7 Up (PepsiCo), F-Square, Dixcy Scott, Malabar Gold and Diamonds, Gold Winner, Ziox Mobile, Pothys, Flipkart and Manappuram, and was a brand ambassador of the Indian Premier League cricket team Royal Challengers Bangalore.

=== PRK Audio ===
Puneeth was the founder and owner of the music label PRK Audio; the label's channel on YouTube has 1,510,000 subscribers as of 1 November 2022.

== Death ==
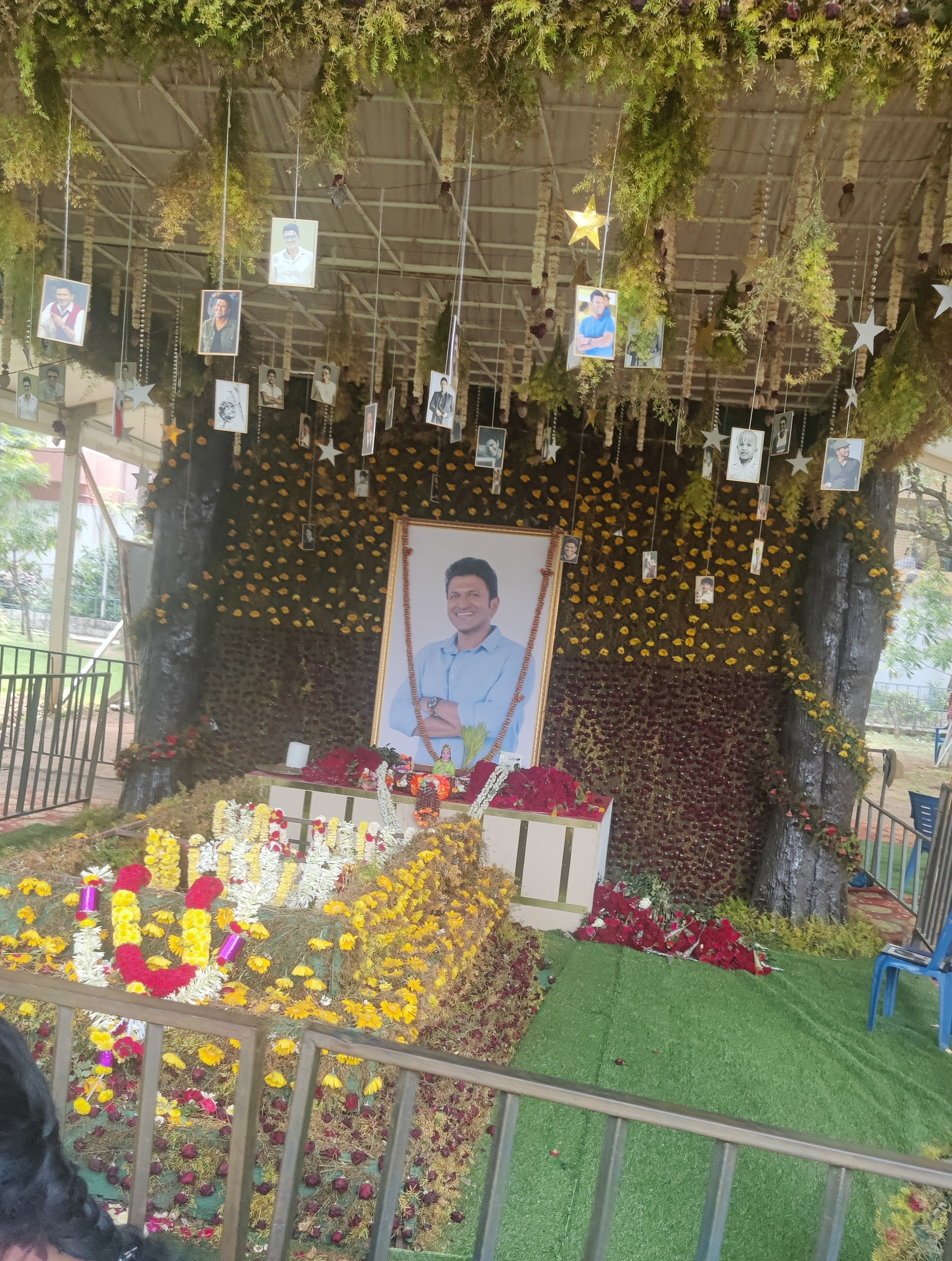
Burial Site of Puneeth Rajkumar near his family grave in Sri Kanteerava Studios, Bangalore.

On 29 October 2021, Puneeth complained of uneasiness to his wife Ashwini, and died on his way to a hospital in Bangalore at the age of 46. The reason for his death was declared to be a heart attack. Posthumously doctors talked of genetic predisposition, as other relatives had cardiac issues, including his father who also died of a heart attack and his older brother Shiva Rajkumar who suffered a heart attack in 2015. He donated his eyes at the Narayana Nethralaya Eye Hospital in accordance with a pledge by his father Rajkumar, that he along with all his family members will donate their eyes after death. The donation of his eyes has given eyesight to four different people. His state funeral was attended by the then Chief Minister of Karnataka, Basavaraj Bommai and other leaders.

The Chief Minister appealed to the people to pay homage and respect to Puneeth by behaving with self-restraint and not giving room for any untoward incidents due to emotional outbursts. Meanwhile, the Chief Minister postponed the meeting of the Group of Ministers on the GST issue scheduled to be held on Friday afternoon under his chairmanship and also canceled his plans to visit Chikkamagaluru and Hassan districts.

There was a wave of mourning in the entire state of Karnataka due to his death. Section 144 was implemented in many areas to control the fans.

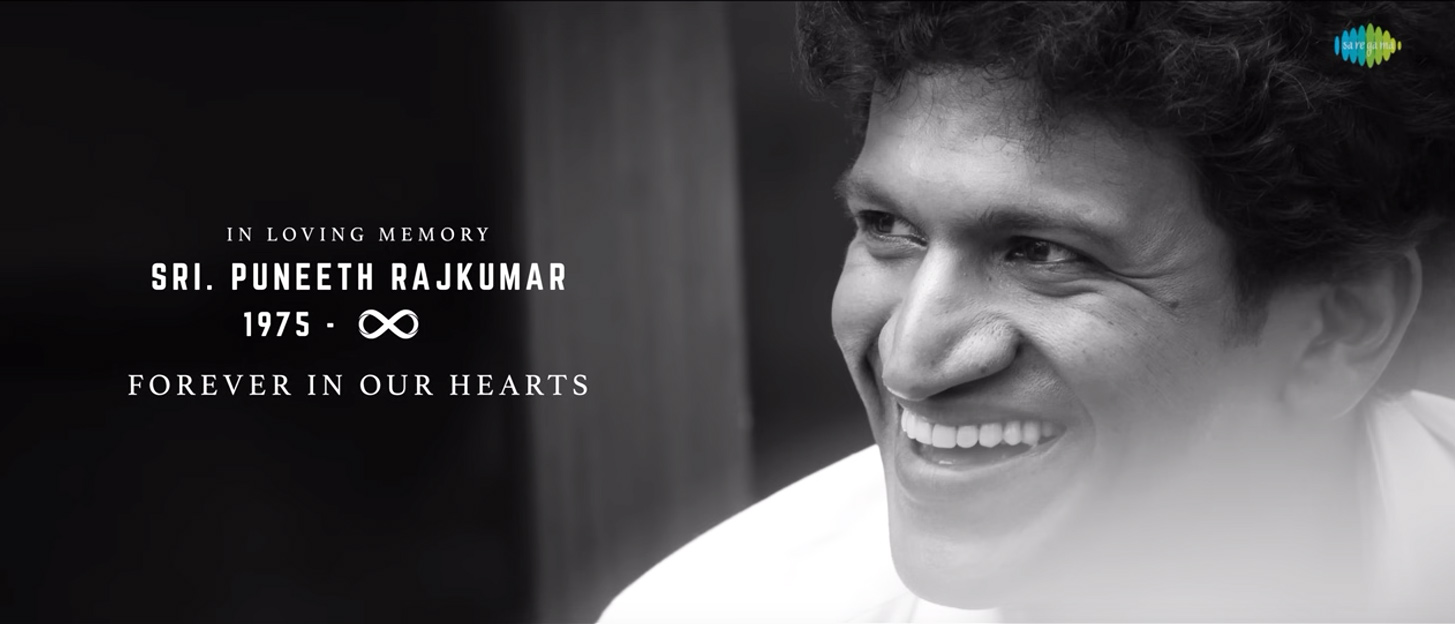
Many films paid tribute in memory of Puneeth Rajkumar

Bangalore was on high alert after the death of Puneeth Rajkumar. Offices and shops in Bangalore were shut down on Friday, an unofficial bandh was declared and police were brought in to control swarming crowds of fans in anticipation of violence after Puneeth died. India's biggest IT services firm, Tata Consultancy Services, sent its employees an advisory around 15:00 local time, asking them to go home early. Television channels showed crowds of fans swarming toward the hospital where his remains were kept, and police were out in force trying to control them. Several cinema halls across Bangalore closed for the day and stopped screening movies in the city. Several popular pubs across the city also closed down after news of Puneeth Rajkumar's death came in.

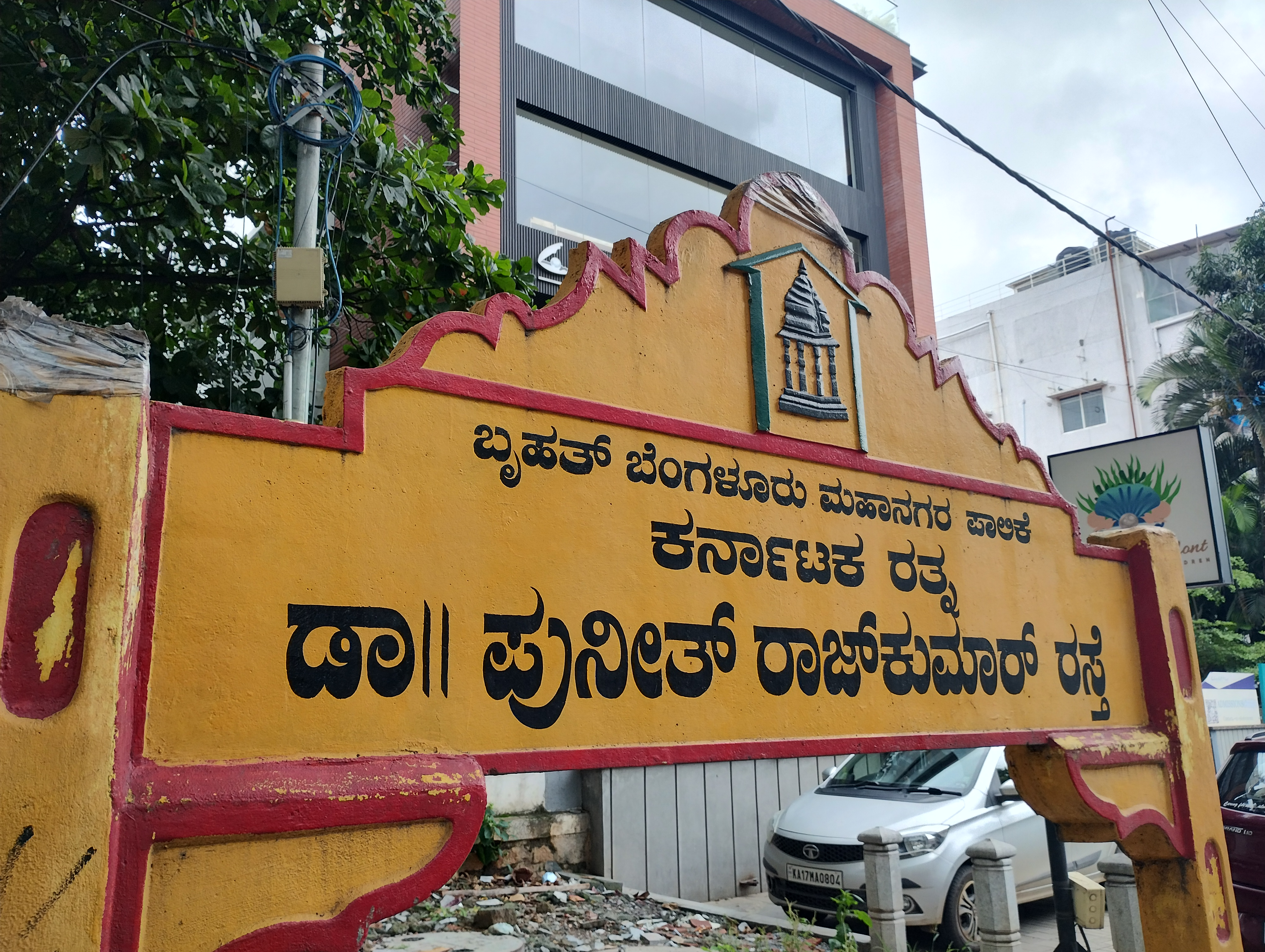
A road in Bangalore, named after the actor

Puneeth's remains were kept in state at Kanteerava Stadium. Many celebrities, including his close friends and co-actors from the Kannada, Tamil, and Telugu film industries arrived to pay their respects. Till the afternoon, the state government had plans to go ahead with the cremation on Saturday evening. But owing to the swerving crowd, the Karnataka government announced on Saturday that the cremation would be held on Sunday morning and the timings would be decided later. Chief Minister Basavaraj Bommai said that the decision was taken as large crowds were still waiting to pay their last respects to their favorite actor. "As per the wishes of people, the funeral will be held tomorrow (Sunday) allowing everyone to have a final viewing. I appeal to fans to cooperate with the police. The police are here to help them. They are also Puneeth's fans," he explained.

Controlling the crowd outside the stadium was very challenging for the police. No vehicle could move on Vitthal Mallya Road owing to the size of the crowd gathered outside the stadium. Police had to divert vehicles via Kasturba Road. After noon, traffic police blocked the movement of vehicles near the Cubbon Park gate. Vehicles of film stars and even those of the police had a tough time navigating the crowd outside Kanteerava Stadium in central Bangalore. From Friday evening, people were flocking to the stadium without any break.

His body was kept for public view at Kanteerava Stadium for 2 days and was reportedly attended by more than 3,000,000 people and was one of the largest funeral gatherings in Indian history of funerals. He was buried alongside his parents at Sree Kanteerava Studios in Bangalore.

After the eye initiative of Puneeth Rajkumar, there was a sudden increase in the eye donations across Karnataka that gave a boost and awareness amongst the people of the State. The doctors of Narayana Nethralaya that runs Dr. Rajkumar's eye bank has mentioned that from the eye bank's inauguration, there was 76,000 eye pledges in total for 30 years. After November 2021, there is a huge number of one lakh eye donations registered in the last 10 months alone.

== Awards and honors ==
- On November 1, 2022, he was posthumously awarded the Karnataka Ratna (the most prestigious award in Karnataka.)
- On 22 March 2022, he was posthumously awarded honorary doctorate from University of Mysore at its 102nd convocation and was received by his wife Ashwini Puneeth Rajkumar.
- The State Government announced to mark his birthday as "Inspiration Day".
- On May 3, 2022, he was given the Basavashree Award posthumously for the year 2021.
- The 212th edition of the Lalbagh Flower Show was dedicated as a tribute to him and his father Dr.Rajkumar.
- A tableau dedicated to him was made on the occasion of the 2022 Mysore Dasara procession.
- Dolls conceptualized on him were reported to be the highlight of the 2022 Dasara doll display.
- An entire day was dedicated to screening his movies at the 2022 Dasara Film Festival.
- He was posthumously conferred with the Lifetime Achievement Award at the 67th Filmfare Awards.
- On October 22 & 23, 2022 restaurants of Bangalore hosted a food festival – Flavours of Gandhada Gudi on the occasion of his last theatrical release Gandhada Gudi.
- All the 200 Kannada movies which released within one year of his demise, paid tribute to him in their opening credits.
- 75 cutouts with garlands were erected outside his memorial on his first death anniversary.
- One of the 75 satellites intended to be launched into orbit during November 15 to December 2022 on the occasion of the 75th year of Indian independence was named after him.
- The Bangalore Outer Ring Road 12-km stretch between Nayandahalli Junction on Mysuru Road and Vega City Mall on Bannerghatta Road via Hosakerehalli, Kathriguppe and JP Nagar was named as Dr. Puneeth Rajkumar Road.
- The 23-foot height statue of Puneeth was unveiled as part of the inauguration of the Ballari Utsava in Bellary in 2023.
- In March 2023, the then Karnataka Chief Minister Bommai inaugurated a multispecialty hospital built in the name of the actor at Nayandahalli in Govindarajanagar constituency.
- The Karnataka Health Department on 31 October 2023 launched Dr. Puneeth Rajkumar Hrudaya Jyoti Yojana to treat people suffering from sudden heart attacks and cardiac issues. The second phase of the scheme was launched in March 2024. In July 2024, it was reported that as many as 10 patients, who reported with chest pain and related symptoms, got a new lease of life in taluk hospitals in Karnataka over a period of 10 days due to early diagnosis and treatment under this scheme. Based on its success in 86 government hospitals, it was announced on 28 September 2024 on the occasion of "World Heart Day" that the facility would be extended to all the taluks in the State.
- A few Bengalureans, on 5 December 2023, paid tribute to him by painting a mural in Basavanagudi.
- At the 13th State Level Philatelic Exhibition KARNAPEX – 2024 conducted from January 5 to January 8, "Special Postal Cover" dedicated to Puneeth Rajkumar was released.
- A free mass marriage event to commemorate the birth anniversary of Puneeth Rajkumar was organised on March 17, 2024, at Dasara Exhibition premises in Mysuru.
- In January 2025, it was reported that a playbook on AI titled "Breaking into AI: The Ultimate Interview Playbook" by Shubakar Shetty was inspired by the generosity of Puneeth Rajkumar.
- India Post announced the release of five special picture postcards on 17 March 2025 featuring Puneeth Rajkumar to commemorate his 50th birthday.
