= Best Director Award (SIIMA) =

The South Indian International Movie Awards for Best Director' is an annual award for best director awarded in four categories for Tamil cinema, Telugu cinema, Kannada cinema, and Malayalam cinema films.

== History ==
The award started in June 2012 by Vishnu Vardhan Induri and Brenda Prasad Adusimilli. The twelfth edition of the award show was held in Dubai on 14 and 15 September 2024.
