= Raajakumara =

- Theatrical release poster
- Directed by: Santhosh Ananddram
- Written by: Santhosh Ananddram
- Produced by: Vijay Kiragandur
- Starring: Puneeth Rajkumar; Priya Anand
- Cinematography: A. Venkatesh
- Edited by: K. M. Prakash
- Music by: V. Harikrishna
- Production company: Hombale Films
- Distributed by: Jayanna Films
- Release date: 24 March 2017
- Running time: 148 minutes
- Country: India
- Language: Kannada
- Box office: ₹75 crore

Raajakumara (transl. The Prince) is a 2017 Indian Kannada-language action family drama film directed and written by Santhosh Ananddram and produced by Vijay Kiragandur under Hombale Films. It stars Puneeth Rajkumar, alongside Priya Anand, R. Sarathkumar, Ananth Nag, Prakash Raj, Chikkanna, Sadhu Kokila, Achyuth Kumar and Avinash. The music was composed by V. Harikrishna, while cinematography and editing were handled by A. Venkatesh and K. M. Prakash.

Raajakumara was released on 24 March 2017 and received positive reviews from critics, where the film grossed ₹75 crore (US$7.8 million) worldwide and went on to become the highest-grossing Kannada film at the time of its release until K.G.F: Chapter 1 surpassed it. The film became the first Kannada movie to complete 6000 shows in multiplex within six weeks of its release and also completed 7577 shows in multiplex within 87 days. The film had a theatrical run of more than 100 days in 45–50 centres across Karnataka and also ran for 150 days in few centers.

== Plot ==
Siddharth is a helpful youngster and adopted son of Ashok, a kind-hearted corporate business magnate. He leads a happy life in Melbourne, Australia taking care of his father's business and fighting for his native country's pride. Siddharth meets and falls for Nandini, a salsa instructor and the daughter of Ashok's friend Jagadeesh. Siddharth's life takes a tragic turn as he loses his whole family in a flight crash and returns to Bangalore to his orphanage headed by Krishna, who now runs an old-age home. Siddharth discovers that Ashok was framed for the deaths of infant children due to the polio scheme introduced by Ashok for the poor people and he decides to prove Ashok's innocence.

Siddharth looks after the old people in an old age home and solves their problems, while also purchasing medicines for the children affected by the polio scheme. One day, Siddharth comes across Vishwa Joshi in the hospital, who also stays at the old-age home. Joshi reveals that the polio scheme was actually ruined due to the machinations created by his son Jagannath, the present Health Minister of Karnataka. Joshi wants to expose the illegal acts committed by Jagannath and was hiding in the old-age home for the right time to expose him.

Siddharth supports Vishwa Joshi and makes Jagannath hand over the case to CBI for further investigation in a news interview. Jagannath tries to ruin their plans, where he gets the old age home and Joshi attacked by his henchmen. However, Jagannath has a change of heart, where he saves Joshi and surrenders himself to the police and all the old people reunite with their children, after realizing their mistakes from Siddharth, who gave a speech at a news.

== Cast ==
- Puneeth Rajkumar as Siddharth aka Appu, Ashok's and Sujatha's adopted son
- Priya Anand as Nandini, a salsa instructor and Siddharth's fiancée
- R. Sarathkumar as Ashok, Siddharth's adoptive father
- Ananth Nag as Vishwa Joshi, Jagannath's father
- Prakash Raj as Jagannath, a corrupt health minister of Karnataka
- Chikkanna as Chikka, Ashram's cook
- Sadhu Kokila as Anthony Gonsalves, a guide at Goa
- Achyuth Kumar as Krishna, Ashram's head
- Honnavalli Krishna as Muniyappa
- Bhargavi Narayan as Puttamma
- Chitra Shenoy as Gayathri
- Anil as Suri, Jagannath's assistant
- Vijayalakshmi Singh as Sujatha, Siddharth's adopted mother
- Rangayana Raghu as Venky, Siddharth's fun-loving uncle
- Dattanna as Mohammad Rafi
- Avinash as Jagadeesh, Nandini's father
- Ashok as Murthy
- Dany Kuttappa as Financier
- M P Venkata Rao
- Aruna Balraj
- Rockline Sudhakar
- Ravi Hegde
- Sundar Ram
- Goutham Karanth
- Bank Suresh
- Malathi Sudhakar
- Ashok Dev
- Veena Sundar
- Vijay Koundinya as corrupt Inspector
- M. K. Mata as Thangam
- Mandeep Roy
- Vijayanand as a press photographer
- K. S. Shridhar
- Jani Master in a cameo appearance "Appu Dance"

== Production ==
=== Development ===
In March 2016, it was reported that Director Santhosh Ananddram and Puneeth Rajkumar would work together for the first time together. V. Harikrishna was selected to compose the music for this film. The film was highly expected due to its marketing. "Rajakumara is a different subject which portrays two different stories & the two stories are bridged between Appu's character", said Santhosh. Pre-production work, location hunt and casting finalisation required almost a year.

=== Casting ===
Priya Anand was roped to play lead actress role which marked her debut in Kannada cinema, collaboration with Puneeth Rajkumar. The film has an ensemble cast starring Ananth Nag, Prakash Raj, Sarath Kumar, Achyuth Rao, Chikkanna, Datthanna, Sadhu Kokila, Rangayana Raghu and others.

=== Filming ===
The film went on the floors on 22 April 2016. The first schedule took place in Australia in various parts like Brisbane, Gold Coast, Sydney and Melbourne after which the crew did the rest of the shoot in Bengaluru, Chennai, Mysuru, Goa, Varanasi and later in Malaysia. The makers of his upcoming film, Raajakumara released the first look of the film on 17 March — to coincide with the actor's 41st birthday.

== Soundtrack ==
Raajakumara

Soundtrack album by V. Harikrishna
- Released: 6 March 2017
- Genre: Feature film soundtrack
- Length: 21:15
- Language: Kannada
- Label: D Beats

V. Harikrishna chronology
Saheba (2017)	Raajakumara (2017)	Bangara s/o Bangarada Manushya (2017)
External audio
- Official Audio Jukebox on YouTube

V. Harikrishna composed the soundtrack album and background score for the film. The full album was released on 6 March 2017. The song "Bombe Helutaithe" samples the beat of the song "Aadisi Nodi Beelisi Nodu" from the film Kasturi Nivasa.

No.	Title	Lyrics	Singer(s)	Length
1.	"Yarivanu Kannadadavanu"	Santhosh Ananddram	Shashank Sheshagiri	4:03
2.	"Yaakingagidhe"	Yogaraj Bhat	Puneeth Rajkumar	3:55
3.	"Bombe Helutaithe"	Santhosh Ananddram	Vijay Prakash	4:47
4.	"Appu Dance"	Santhosh Ananddram	Santhosh Venky, Priya Himesh	4:12
5.	"Saagaradha"	Ghouse Peer	Sonu Nigam	4:34

Hindi tracklist
No.	Title	Lyrics	Singer(s)	Length
1.	"Mr. Perfect"	M. V. Gopal Ram	Harry Mallya	4:03
2.	"Yeh Kya Ho Raha Hai"	M. V. Gopal Ram	Rajkumar	3:55
3.	"Gudiya Dolti Hai"	M. V. Gopal Ram	Harry Mallya	4:47
4.	"Appu Dance"	M. V. Gopal Ram	Harry Mallya, Rini Chandra	4:12
5.	"Saagar Ki Lehre"	M. V. Gopal Ram	Pankaj Saini	4:34

== Reception ==
Raajakumara received positive reviews from critics.

=== Critical response ===
Sunayana Suresh from The Times Of India gave 4 out of 5 stars and wrote "The entire ensemble cast, right from comedians Rangayana Raghu and Achyuth Kumar to antagonist Prakash Raj and veterans like Ananth Nag, HG Dattatreya and Bhargavi Narayan have interesting characters sketched out that entertain you."

Archana Nathan of The Hindu described the film as generic and wrote "There is very little that gives Raajakumara its identity or a clear storyline ... Achyuth Kumar and Ananth Nag perform well but their roles too are too simplistically written." Shyam Prasad of Bangalore Mirror gave 3 out of 5 stars and wrote "The constant reference to Puneeth’s career and films goes overboard at times. The film becomes a tribute to the actor and a personality building exercise mostly. But he manages to pull off the role with the subtlety that proves his acting prowess again."

== Box office ==
The film released in over 350 screens across Karnataka. The makers claimed the movie grossed ₹46 crores even before completion of seven weeks. Though later there were reports of the movie having collected a little less than ₹100 crores, the tracked figures was ₹75 crore. It went on to become highest grossing Kannada film of all time until the release of K.G.F: Chapter 1.

== Awards ==
Award	Category	Recipient	Result	Ref.
2017 Karnataka State Film Awards	Best Family Entertainer	Vijay Kiragandur; Santhosh Ananddram	Won	
2017 Karnataka State Film Awards	Best Music Direction	V. Harikrishna	Won	
65th Filmfare Awards South	Best Director	Santhosh Ananddram	Nominated	
65th Filmfare Awards South	Best Actor	Puneeth Rajkumar	Won	
65th Filmfare Awards South	Best Music Director	V. Harikrishna	Nominated	
65th Filmfare Awards South	Best Lyricist	Santhosh Ananddram ("Bombe Heluthaithe")	Nominated	
65th Filmfare Awards South	Best Male Playback Singer	Vijay Prakash – "Bombe Heluthaithe"	Nominated	
Zee Kannada Hemmeya Kannadiga Award 2018	Hemmeya Chitra (Proud Film)	Raajakumara	Won	
Zee Kannada Hemmeya Kannadiga Award 2018	Hemmeya Nata (Proud Hero)	Puneeth Rajkumar	Won	
Zee Kannada Hemmeya Kannadiga Award 2018	Hemmeya Nirdeshaka (Proud director)	Santhosh Ananddram	Won	
Love Lavike Readers Choice Award	Best Actor	Puneeth Rajkumar	Won	
7th South Indian International Movie Awards	Best Film	Vijay Kiragandur	Won	
7th South Indian International Movie Awards	Best Director	Santhosh Ananddram	Won	
7th South Indian International Movie Awards	Best Actor	Puneeth Rajkumar	Won	
7th South Indian International Movie Awards	Best Actor in a Negative Role	Prakash Raj	Nominated	
7th South Indian International Movie Awards	Best Comedian	Chikkanna	Won	
7th South Indian International Movie Awards	Best Music Director	V Harikrishna	Won	
7th South Indian International Movie Awards	Best Lyricist	Santhosh Ananddram ("Bombe Heluthaithe")	Won	
7th South Indian International Movie Awards	Best Male Playback Singer	Vijay Prakash – "Bombe Heluthaithe	Nominated	
