= Pathu Thala =

2023 film directed by Obeli N. Krishna

- Theatrical release poster
- Directed by: Obeli N. Krishna
- Screenplay by: Obeli N. Krishna
- Dialogue by: S. A. Ramakrishnan
- Story by: Narthan; Obeli N. Krishna
- Based on: Mufti (Kannada) by Narthan
- Produced by: Jayantilal Gada; K. E. Gnanavel Raja
- Starring: Silambarasan; Gautham Ram Karthik; Priya Bhavani Shankar; Gautham Vasudev Menon
- Cinematography: Farook J. Basha
- Edited by: Praveen K. L.
- Music by: A. R. Rahman
- Production companies: Studio Green; Pen Studios
- Release date: 30 March 2023
- Running time: 152 minutes
- Country: India
- Language: Tamil
- Box office: ₹55 crore

Pathu Thala (transl. Ten-Headed) is a 2023 Indian Tamil-language neo-noir action thriller film directed by Obeli N. Krishna and produced by Studio Green, in the company of Pen Studios. The film stars Silambarasan in the lead role, alongside Gautham Ram Karthik, Priya Bhavani Shankar, Gautham Vasudev Menon, Santhosh Prathap, Kalaiyarasan, Anu Sithara and Teejay Arunasalam. It is a remake of the 2017 Kannada-language film Mufti. The film follows AG Ravanan "AGR", a crime boss, who gets tracked down by Guna, an undercover cop as Sakthivel.

The Tamil remake of Mufti was announced in June 2019, with Narthan, the director of the original film, as the director. Principal photography faced postponement due to Silambarasan delaying the commencement. Which led to, the following year in October, Narthan opting out and subsequently being replaced with Krishna. Principal photography commenced in August 2021. It was shot sporadically in several legs and wrapped by late-November 2022. Filming locations included Chennai and Karnataka. The film has music composed by A. R. Rahman, cinematography handled by Farook J. Basha and editing by Praveen K. L.

Pathu Thala was released on 30 March 2023. It received mixed to positive reviews from critics.

== Plot ==
Tamil Nadu CM, Arunmozhi Raja, disappears after being summoned at night by Deputy CM Naanjilar Gunasekaran, who is also his political rival. The CBI investigates Ameer, the henchman of a dreaded crime boss AG Raavanan alias AGR, who is known to be Naanjilar's sworn enemy. After being surrounded by the police, Ameer commits suicide rather than surrendering.

Sakthivel, an undercover CBI officer, is dispatched to undercover under the alias of Guna to work under crime boss Kareem Bhai and collect evidence against AGR. After an incident, Bhai sends Guna to work for AGR, where he meets and butts heads with AGR's trusted henchman Selvin. Guna encounters his ex-girlfriend Leela Thompson, a Tahsildar who makes an effort to thwart AGR's illegal sand mining operation. He later ends up earning the trust of AGR's right-hand man Singha after he retrieves ₹400 crores from a goods train under the noses of a CVC team. During a contested by-election, Naanjilar convinces Ruby Fernandez, a career criminal and head of the Fishermen’s Association, to compete against AGR's candidate by protesting against AGR's illegal sand mining. The small protest escalates, resulting in the arson of an old age home 'Nesakaram'. Naanjilar alleges that AGR was behind the fire. In retaliation, AGR beheads Ruby. Leela, frustrated by AGR's power, decides to run for office in the by-election. Guna finally meets AGR after he saves him from an assassination attempt orchestrated by Naanjilar. Guna learns that Arunmozhi’s wife Samudra is AGR’s sister, who resides with AGR along with her daughter Aradhana, and who holds a grudge against her brother.

AGR later threatens Naanjilar, who vows to kill him. During the campaigning for the by-election, Selvin sees Leela and Guna having a conversation and suspects that he might be the mole in AGR’s gang. He breaks into Guna's residence and finds a pen-drive which has all the evidence collected against AGR. Guna watches Selvin through the surveillance cameras in his home and sees Selvin get gunned down. AGR's underlings initially suspect Guna as the murderer, but AGR proves his innocence. Meanwhile, the people residing in Nesakaram learn that AGR has been the sponsor of their nursing home, and has been conducting charitable activities funded by the profits of his illegal sand mining. This earns AGR the respect of the people, including Leela.

AGR later discovers that his business manager Sabari is the mole in his operations. After finding out that Sabari killed Selvin, informed the CVC team about his illegal profits being transported by train, and helped Ruby burn down Nesakaram under Naanjilar's instructions, AGR brutally kills Sabari in front of Guna. Guna helps AGR and Samudra reconcile and overhears Samudra forgive her brother for killing her husband. AGR later reveals to Guna that Arunmozhi had been bribed by a pharmaceutical company that planned to start an epidemic under the pretext of introducing a vaccine. An angry AGR then kidnapped and killed Arunmozhi. AGR further reveals that he knows Guna's real identity as Sakthivel but does not plan to retaliate against him as he helped AGR reconcile with his sister. Naanjilar arrives with his men to kill AGR. In the ensuing melee, Singha is killed, and Sakthivel is shot in place of AGR. An angry AGR kills Naanjilar.

The next morning, the CBI arrests AGR using his confession to Sakthivel, despite widespread protests by the people. The CBI chief pushes Sakthivel to submit the recorded confession as evidence, but Sakthivel lies and claims that the encrypted evidence was destroyed when he was shot. The CBI chief bitterly remarks that his Sakthi has truly become AGR's Guna. Due to a lack of evidence, AGR is released.

== Cast ==
- Silambarasan as AG Ravanan 'AGR', a crime boss
- Gautham Ram Karthik as Guna / Sakthivel IPS, an undercover cop
- Gautham Vasudev Menon as Naanjilaar Gunasekaran, Deputy CM
- Priya Bhavani Shankar as Leela Thompson, the Tahsildar in Kanyakumari
- Santhosh Prathap as CM Arunmozhi, Samudra's husband and AGR's brother-in-law
- Anu Sithara as Samudra, AGR's sister and Arunmozhi's wife
- Kalaiyarasan as Ameer, AGR's henchman
- Teejay Arunasalam as Selvin, AGR's right-hand man
- Madhu Guruswamy as Singha, AGR's commander
- Joe Malloori as Sabari, AGR's business manager
- Obeli N. Krishna as CM Vaazhai Karunakaran
- Redin Kingsley as Kuttapare, AGR's henchman
- Gajaraj as Father Thomas
- Manushyaputhiran as Nesakaram Trust Owner
- Kannan Ponnaiya as Pistol, Guna's assistant
- Vettai Muthukumar as Kareem Bhai
- Namo Narayana as Mullai Venthan
- Sendrayan as Poongunran
- Ashvin Raja as Thangamani
- Soundararaja as Assistant Commissioner Inban
- Abhishek Vinod as Kota Rao
- Lakshmi Priya as Pooja
- Dheeraj as Dheeraj
- Mona Kakade as Naanjilar Gunasekharan’s wife
- Harshitha as Aaradhana
- Umesh Kaushik as Umesh
- Dindigul Dhanam as Pandiyamma
- M. S. Raaja Rajeshwaran as Protester
- RS Ramakrishnan as assistant of Naanjilaar Gunasekaran
- Sayyeshaa as a dancer (for the item song "Raawadi")

== Production ==
=== Development ===
The film was launched in June 2019 with Narthan, who directed Mufti (2017), as the director. Silambarasan and Gautham Karthik were announced to star in the film. After a delay in the film's shooting due to Silambarasan not showing up to the sets, media outlets started reporting that the film was dropped in October 2019. Narthan later opted out and was replaced by Obeli N. Krishna, who previously directed films like Sillunu Oru Kaadhal (2006) and Nedunchaalai (2014). After Krishna entered the project, the film's writing was reworked to include more characters and a modified storyline. Silambarasan, who was simultaneously shooting for Gautham Vasudev Menon’s Vendhu Thanindhathu Kaadu, was reported to join the film's sets again. The scenes involving Silambarasan had to be reshot because of his weight transformation post-Eeswaran (2021). The title Pathu Thala was announced on 24 December 2020.

=== Filming ===
Principal photography began in August 2021. The second schedule was postponed so many times, the shooting resumed in July 2022. Major portions of Silambarasan were shot near Bellary Palace in the Mysore district in Karnataka. In October 2022, it was reported that the Karnataka schedule of the film was wrapped. The third schedule of the film began in Chennai on 13 August 2022 with Gautham Karthik joining the sets. The final schedule of the film was reported to begin in July and was reported to complete in August 2022. On 23 November 2022, the entire shooting of the film was wrapped. Despite the film's three year delay, Silambarasan said that "he was determined that I should finish this film for Gautham Karthik's sake".

=== Post-production ===
The post-production works began in December 2022. Gautham Karthik and Priya Bhavani Shankar completed dubbing for their portions on 22 December 2022 and 3 January 2023, respectively.

== Music ==
The music of the film is composed by A. R. Rahman which marks his second collaboration with the director after Sillunu Oru Kaadhal and fifth film to feature actor Silambarasan after Vinnaithaandi Varuvaayaa (2010), Achcham Yenbadhu Madamaiyada (2016), Chekka Chivantha Vaanam (2018) and Vendhu Thanindhathu Kaadu (2022). The first single titled "Namma Satham" was released on 3 February 2023 coinciding with Silambarasan’s birthday. The second single titled "Ninaivirukka" was released on 13 March 2023. The entire soundtrack was released on 18 March 2023, with an additional song, titled "Osarattum Pathu Thala", releasing on 27 March. The song “Nee Singam Dhan” became widely popular among cricket fans during IPL 2025, especially after famous Indian cricketer Virat Kohli mentioned it as his current favourite in RCB Podcast. Nee Singham Dhan has been associated with CSK fans as it was dedicated to MS Dhoni especially after their 2023 IPL victory, where the song saw a surge in streams on platforms like Spotify.

Track listing - Tamil
No.	Title	Lyrics	Singer(s)	Length
1.	"Namma Satham"	Vivek	A. R. Rahman, Yogi Sekar	3:41
2.	"Ninaivirukka"	Kabilan	A. R. Ameen, Shakthisree Gopalan	4:44
3.	"Nee Singam Dhan"	Vivek	Sid Sriram	4:07
4.	"Raawadi"	Snehan	Shuba, Nivas	3:11
5.	"Osarattum Pathu Thala"	Naattu Raja Durai	Deepthi Suresh, Sreekanth Hariharan, Sathyaprakash	4:48

== Release ==
=== Theatrical ===
The film was released theatrically on 30 March 2023. Initially the film was scheduled to be released theatrically on 14 December 2022, but the film's release was postponed.

=== Home media ===
The post-theatrical streaming and satellite rights of the film were acquired by Amazon Prime Video and Zee Tamil. The film was premiered on Amazon Prime Video on 27 April 2023.

== Reception ==
=== Box office ===
The film grossed over ₹20 crores worldwide after three days of its release. After the sixth day of its release the film grossed ₹50 crores worldwide. Its closing worldwide collection stands at ₹55 crore.

=== Critical response ===
Pathu Thala received positive reviews from critics. On the review aggregator website Rotten Tomatoes, 60% of 5 critics' reviews are positive, with an average rating of 5.5/10.

Logesh Balachandran of The Times of India gave the film 3 out of 5 and wrote "Pathu Thala may not be a great film for those who have watched the original, but it's still worth watching for the lead actors and some standout moments." Janani K of India Today gave the film 2.5 out of 5 and wrote "Pathu Thala could have been an intriguing gangster drama if only it had done away with predictable elements."

Bhuvanesh Chandar of The Hindu wrote "It is unfair to compare Mufti and Pathu Thala; however, this remake is a good case study of how it isn’t enough to infuse more novelty on paper if the same doesn’t translate to the screen." Bharathy Singaravel of The News Minute gave the film 1.5 out of 5 and wrote "The film has a few formulaic moments that aspire to that description, but director Obeli N Krishna fails to pull together a cohesive story. Even AR Rahman's music does not elevate this film which cannot boast of a single memorable song."
