= Blast (2026 film) =

- Theatrical release poster
- Directed by: Subash K. Raj
- Written by: Subash K. Raj
- Produced by: Kalpathi S. Aghoram; Kalpathi S. Ganesh; Kalpathi S. Suresh
- Starring: Arjun Sarja; Abhirami; Preity Mukhundhan
- Cinematography: Arunkrishna Radhakrishnan
- Edited by: Pradeep E. Ragav
- Music by: Ravi Basrur
- Production company: AGS Entertainment
- Distributed by: AGS Cinemas
- Release date: 28 May 2026
- Running time: 143 minutes
- Country: India
- Language: Tamil
- Budget: ₹18 crore
- Box office: ₹75 crore

Blast is a 2026 Indian Tamil-language action film directed by Subash K. Raj in his debut and produced by AGS Entertainment. The film stars Arjun Sarja, Abhirami and Preity Mukhundhan, with Vivek Prasanna, John Kokken, Arjun Chidambaram, Dileepan and Pawan play supporting roles. It follows a family whose peaceful life is threatened by a corporate syndicate with diabolical plans.

The film was shot between August 2025 and February 2026. Initially known by the working title AGS28, denoting AGS Entertainment's 28th film, the official title was revealed two months after filming ended. The music was composed by Ravi Basrur with cinematography by Arunkrishna Radhakrishnan and editing by Pradeep E. Ragav.

Blast was released on 28 May 2026. The film became a major commercial success, grossing ₹75 crore (US$7.8 million) worldwide against a budget of ₹18 crore (US$1.9 million), emerging as one of the highest-grossing Tamil films of 2026.

== Plot ==
Rajaram runs a karate school at his house. Living with him are his wife Neelaveni; his younger brother Ilango, a medical shop owner; and his daughter Nila, a white collar employee. All of them are also skilled in karate. Rajaram always encourages his daughter to stand up for herself and defend anybody she can due to which she gets into frequent fights much to the chagrin of Neelaveni. As a result, Neelaveni makes Nila promise to never get into any fights and just let things go.

Varun Dhayalan is a corrupt businessman who wants to establish a Black Opal mining business at the cost of the destruction of an entire village. He hires assassin Abraham, a criminal who works alone to help launder money in the process. One night, Abraham is involved in a minor car accident during which he is rendered unconscious and taken to a hospital for treatment. Inspector Arunagiri is tasked with finding Abraham's identity and get the help he needs. But, upon regaining consciousness, Abraham kills the police constables he is guarded by and escapes to meet with notorious gangster Kiribakaran with whom he is presently working with on Varun's task.

Meanwhile, one of Kiruba's henchmen Toby is brutally beaten up by Nila after he attempts to snatch her chain while running an errand for Kirubakaran purchasing medicines for Abraham from Ilango's medical shop. He lands at the exact police station Arunagiri is from and lets Kirubakaran know. Out of fear that Nila might reveal Toby's visit to purchase the medicines during the filing of FIR against Toby, Kirubakaran sends his brother Shiva and few other henchmen to kill Nila, Neelaveni, and Rajaram. But they all are brutally beaten up and killed by the family and buried in their backyard. Fearing that lodging a complaint against Toby in the police station might invite trouble, Rajaram and Nila go to the police station to withdraw the case. They get to know that Arunagiri's family is held hostage by Kirubakaran having misunderstood that Arunagiri is holding Shiva and others. Rajaram and Nila decide to save Arunagiri's family as they feel guilty.

Meanwhile Abraham realises that Shiva had mistakenly taken Abraham's wallet thinking its his when he left to Rajaram's house. The wallet contains a verification token that Abraham requires for the money laundering operation to be successful. He decides to go in search of Shiva himself and lands up eventually in Rajaram's house. A fight ensues between the family and Abraham in which Abraham is overpowered and subdued. Rajaram and Nila head to the hideout where Arunagiri's family is held hostage and encounters Kirubakaran and his subordinates there. After getting to know about the destructive mining project, Rajaram and Nila kill Kirubakaran and others while freeing Arunagiri's family. Varun is also eventually located and killed.

Three months later, while in Ilango's shop, Nila watches a news story about the mysterious death of Varun, Kirubakaran, and others.

== Cast ==
- Arjun Sarja as Rajaram
  - Videsh Anand as young Rajaram (uncredited)
- Abhirami as Neelaveni Rajaram
- Preity Mukhundhan as Nila Rajaram
  - Shivakami S. L. as young Nila
- Vivek Prasanna as Ilango
- John Kokken as Varun Dhayalan
- Arjun Chidambaram as Abraham
- Pawan as Kirubakaran
- Dileepan as Inspector K. Arunagiri
- Namo Narayana as Muthukaruppan
- Bala Hasan as Shiva
- Vinod Sagar as Toby
- P. L. Thenappan as the mining minister
- Arun Pandian as the home minister
- Mathew Varghese as Commisioner R. Manimaaran
- Ramesh Narayanan as Eli
- Apollo Ravi as Varun's manager
- Aadukalam Stella Raj as Sundaram's victim
- Ravi Adithyan as a CCTV operator
- Muthamil as Karthikeyan
- Riythvika as Nila, Rajaram's and Ilango's late sister (in portrait)
- Niranjan Mosses as Inspector

== Production ==
Blast is the directorial debut of Subash K. Raj, who previously worked as an assistant director to Pradeep Ranganathan in Love Today (2022). He cast Arjun because he felt the actor could "convincingly be a father, hero, karate master, and perform action effortlessly", and Abhirami because he felt she "would look convincing while beating someone up". Arjun said he could get "into the skin of the character", a martial artist, since he himself is a skilled martial artist. Swasika was the initial choice for Abhirami's role but declined due to scheduling conflicts with Karuppu (2026). The film, initially known by the working title AGS28, denoting AGS Entertainment's 28th film, began production in August 2025 in Chennai, and wrapped in February 2026, with the official title revealed that April.

== Music ==
Blast

Soundtrack album by Ravi Basrur
- Released: 28 May 2026
- Recorded: 2025–2026
- Venues: Bengaluru, Karnataka
- Studio: Ravi Basrur Music Studio
- Genre: Feature film soundtrack
- Length: 19:39
- Language: Tamil
- Label: Think Music
- Producers: Ravi Basrur; Pavan Basrur; Chethan Handattu

Ravi Basrur chronology
Veera Chandrahasa (2025)	Blast (2026)	Kattalan (2026)
External audio
- Blast – Jukebox on YouTube

Singles from Blast
- 1. "The Rage" Released: 15 May 2026; 2. "The Life" Released: 21 May 2026

The music was composed by Ravi Basrur in his Tamil debut and maiden collaboration with Subash K. Raj. The first single "The Rage" was released on 15 May 2026, the second single "The Life" on 21 May, and the final single "I Want Everything" on 30 May. The complete soundtrack album was released as a jukebox the following day, on 31 May.

Track listing
No.	Title	Lyrics	Singer(s)	Length
1.	"The Rage"	Chethan Handattu	Rohith Siddappa	3:45
2.	"The Life"	Madhurakavi	Vaikom Vijayalakshmi	4:02
3.	"I Want Everything"	Ravi Basrur	Airaa Udupi	4:13
4.	"Alpha"	Vivek	Benny Dayal, Rohith Siddappa (rap)	4:11
5.	"Arakkan Thanae"	Arivu	Arivu	3:28
Total length:				19:39

Blast

Film score by Ravi Basrur
- Released: 3 July 2026 (Vol.1); 27 August 2026 (Vol.2)
- Recorded: 2025–2026
- Genre: film score
- Length: 40:14 (Vol.1); 38:45 (Vol.2)
- Language: Tamil
- Label: Think Music
- Producer: Ravi Basrur

Ravi Basrur chronology
Veera Chandrahasa (2025)	Blast (2026)	Kattalan (2026)
External audio
- Blast (Vol.1) – Original Score on YouTube
- Blast (Vol.2) – Original Score on YouTube

Blast – Vol.1 (Original Score)
No.	Title	Length
1.	"Raja Raman Intro"	1:05
2.	"Nila's Return"	0:24
3.	"Alpha"	0;18
4.	"Nila Unmatched"	0:56
5.	"Takita Taka"	1:42
6.	"The Blast Theme"	0:52
7.	"Flames of Nila"	0:42
8.	"House of Blood"	1:45
9.	"We Are One"	1:37
10.	"Uncover"	0:50
11.	"Dark Release"	1:54
12.	"The Blueprint"	1:07
13.	"Blitz"	1:21
14.	"After Nila"	1:05
15.	"Invisible Game"	0:57
16.	"Invisible Game 02"	1:06
17.	"The Rage"	2:04
18.	"Fury of Love"	0:28
19.	"The Apex of Violence"	1:15
20.	"Dread Rising"	1:22
21.	"Theme of Toby"	0:57
22.	"Game of Class"	1:39
23.	"Shield Maiden"	0:47
24.	"Overtake"	1:06
25.	"Mad Game"	2:52
26.	"Siva and Gang"	1:01
27.	"Hakaishin"	1:47
28.	"Valkyrie"	1:23
29.	"Triad of Rain"	1:48
30.	"The Shadow Hunt"	2:38
31.	"Tandav of the Triads"	1:26
Total length:		40:14

Blast – Vol.2 (Original Score)
No.	Title	Length
1.	"The Breakthrough"	1:10
2.	"Over Master"	0 46
3.	"This is not Over"	0:49
4.	"Velocity Shift"	1:10
5.	"Funky Footprints"	1:27
6.	"The Better Play"	0:50
7.	"The Twist"	1:04
8.	"Wrong Screwdriver"	0:28
9.	"Wrong Screwdriver 2"	1:26
10.	"The Hunt"	1:29
11.	"Abraham Endgame"	3:06
12.	"Abraham Endgame 2"	0:43
13.	"Abraham Endgame 3"	1:06
14.	"Raga of Rage"	2:13
15.	"Cithappa Entry"	1:35
16.	"Bloody Duo"	2:38
17.	"Black Opal"	0:54
18.	"The Life"	1:33
19.	"Inquisitive Chase"	1:06
20.	"Inquisitive Chase 2"	00:43
21.	"Varun Dhayalan Unleashed"	2:40
22.	"End of Abraham"	2:10
23.	"Eternal Symphony of Blast"	1:23
24.	"The Final Blast"	1:21
25.	"Blast – The Klassic"	1:15
26.	"I Want Everything (Trailer Epic Version)"	1:56
27.	"Takita Takita"	1:44
Total length:		38:45

== Release ==
=== Theatrical ===
Blast was released in theatres in 28 May 2026. AGS Cinemas distributed the film in Tamil Nadu.

=== Home media ===
The film began streaming on Netflix from 25 June 2026.

== Reception ==
=== Critical response ===
Janani K of India Today said the film had "promising ideas", but its "predictable screenplay and long runtime keep it from reaching its full potential". The Times of India wrote, "The casting and performances of most actors, including the younger Nila, are on point, which aids the writing. The action blocks may seem a little repetitive, and some choices like cutting to a different sentiment in the middle of an important action scene might put us off, but such qualms can be overlooked. Because the biggest win of debutant director Subash K Raj is knowing exactly when enough is enough". Bhumi Vashisht of The Sunday Guardian wrote, "Despite strong performances, especially Preity Mukundhan, the film suffers from uneven pacing, weak villains, and a predictable, overlong screenplay".

Bhuvanesh Chandar of The Hindu wrote, "Blast is a Preity Mukundhan show all along, and the Star-actor knows how to pack a punch, alright! In a different film, where more ingenious ideas are spring-loaded for mass elevations, Blast would have truly become her career-defining big bang". Vishal Menon of The Hollywood Reporter India wrote, "Blast has a way of making you feel like it has earned your whistles. Larger points about the environment, corruption and most obviously gender politics, are made without any sermonising and this makes the film that much more endearing".

=== Box office ===
Blast collected over ₹25 crore (US$2.6 million) in its first four days. By 3 June, trade analysts considered the film a major success, as it had surpassed its break-even point and recovered more than its ₹18 crore (US$1.9 million) budget. The film eventually closed with ₹75 crore (US$7.8 million) worldwide.
