= Anjani Putra =

2017 action comedy film directed by A. Harsha

- Theatrical release poster
- Directed by: A. Harsha
- Screenplay by: A. Harsha
- Based on: Poojai (2014) by Hari
- Produced by: M. N. Kumar
- Starring: Puneeth Rajkumar; Rashmika Mandanna; Ramya Krishna
- Cinematography: Swamy J. Gowda
- Edited by: Deepu S. Kumar
- Music by: Ravi Basrur
- Production companies: MNK Movies; Jayashreedevi Productions
- Distributed by: MN Kumar
- Release date: 21 December 2017
- Running time: 139 min
- Country: India
- Language: Kannada

Anjani Putra (transl. Son of Anjani) is a 2017 Indian Kannada-language action comedy film directed by A. Harsha and produced by M. N. Kumar. The film stars Puneeth Rajkumar, alongside Rashmika Mandanna, Ramya Krishna, Mukesh Tiwari, P. Ravi Shankar and Chikkanna. The music was composed by Ravi Basrur, while cinematography and editing were handled by Swamy J. and Deepu S. Kumar respectively. The film was a remake of director Hari's Tamil film Poojai.

The film was officially launched on 6 February 2017 and principal photography began a week later. The trailer was launched on 24 November 2017, along with an audio launch held by PRK Audio company.

Anjani Putra was released on 21 December 2017 to mixed reviews from critics and became a commercial success at the box office.

== Plot ==
Viraj "Raja" is the heir of a cloth manufacturing company named Raj Group, who gets disowned by his mother and matriarch of his joint family Anjana Devi due to some misunderstanding. Years later, Viraj is now working as a moneylender leading a life with his friends Chikka and Karimale, where he also falls in love with a rich girl named Geetha. At a theatre, Raja saves a newly transferred ASP Surya Prakash and his wife from a group of North Indian killers who work for Bhairava, a businessman and hitman as Surya Prakash was transferred to investigate Bhairava's client case.

Bhairava also plans to illegally grab land sold to a village temple by Raja's late father Muthuraju. These two incidents cause enmity between Raja and Bhairava. When the land is formally sold to the temple, an irate Bhairava orders his henchman to assault Raja's uncle Satyaraju. Anjana Devi realizes her mistake of misunderstanding Raja and reunites with him. Raja learns about the incident and thrashes Bhairava's henchmen. Later, Bhairava tries to attack Raja, but Raja thrashes him in full view of the public.

Assisted by Surya Prakash and Geetha, Raja subdues Bhairava's attempts to destroy his family by capturing the North Indian killers, leading to Bhairava's arrest warrant being issued. During the temple festival, Bhairava's second wife stabs Anjana Devi with a venomous knife, but Anjana Devi survives the attack. Enraged, Raja rushes to Jodhpur and kills Bhairava and his hitman friend Raj Thakur. Raja returns home and joins with his family along with Geetha and her family for a family photo.

== Cast ==
- Puneeth Rajkumar as Viraj "Raja"
- Rashmika Mandanna as Geetha
- Ramya Krishna as Anjana Devi, Viraj's mother
- Mukesh Tiwari as Bhairava
- P. Ravi Shankar as SP Surya Prakash
- Akhilendra Mishra as Raj Thakur
- V. Manohar as Geetha's father
- Seetha Kote as Geetha's mother
- Ratnakar Upadhayay as Geetha's cousin
- Sadhu Kokila as a servant at Raja's house
- Chikkanna as Chikka
- Girish shivanna as Karimale
- Harini Chandra as Viraj's aunt
- Cockroach Sudhi as Suri, Bhairava's right-hand man
- Hariprriya as a dancer in the song "1234 Shille Hodi"

== Soundtrack ==
Anjani Putra

Soundtrack album by Ravi Basrur
- Released: 24 November 2017
- Genre: Feature film soundtrack
- Length: 19:05
- Language: Kannada
- Label: PRK Audio

Ravi Basrur chronology
Mufti (2017)	Anjani Putra (2017)	Samhaara (2018)
External audio
- Official Audio Jukebox on YouTube

Ravi Basrur had composed the soundtrack and film score for the film. The audio was sold to PRK Music owned by Puneeth Rajkumar and was released on 24 November 2017, alongside the launch of PRK Music. The tune of "1234 Shille Hodi" was also used in Basrur's previous film Bilinder.

No.	Title	Lyrics	Singer(s)	Length
1.	"Anjani Putra"	Kinnal Raj	Ravi Basrur, Srinivas, Mohan	2:33
2.	"Magariya"	Chethan Kumar	Sachin Basrur	3:04
3.	"Geetha"	Ravi Basrur	Vijay Prakash, Supriya Lohith	3:31
4.	"1234 Shille Hodi"	V. Nagendra Prasad	Puneeth Rajkumar, Chandan Shetty	3:33
5.	"Chanda Chanda"	Pramod Maravante	Ravi Basrur, Anuradha Bhat	3:19
6.	"Saahukaaraa"	K. Kalyan	Vijay Prakash	3:00
7.	"Chanda Chanda ft. Kailash Kher"	Pramod Maravante	Kailash Kher, Anuradha Bhat	3:19
Total length:				19:05

== Release ==
Anjani Putra was released on 21 December 2017.

=== Home media ===
The satellite and digital rights of the film were sold to Udaya TV and Sun NXT.

== Reception ==
Anjani Putra received mixed reviews from critics.

=== Critical response ===
S. Shyam Prasad of Bangalore Mirror gave 3/5 stars and wrote "Harsha has hit the bull's eye and Anjaniputra has all the hallmarks of becoming his biggest box office register." Prakash Upadhyaya of IBTimes gave 3/5 stars and wrote "Anjani Putra is not a nail-biting, but it is high on entertainment." A. Sharadhaa of Cinema Express gave 3/5 stars and wrote "Though a familiar plot, director Harsha has done a fairly decent job. This is a film truly dedicated to Puneeth Rajkumar’s fans by Harsha, who is himself a big fan of the star."

Mayur Javali of Filmibeat gave 3/5 stars and wrote "A decent one time watch for the family audience and a power packed feast for the fans of Powerstar." Sunayana Suresh of The Times of India gave 2.5/5 stars and wrote "Anjaniputhraa may not be one of the most compelling commercial films of the year, but it does have its moments that are more than worth it for die-hard Appu fanatics to make a beeline at the cinema halls." Manoj Kumar. R of The Indian Express gave 2/5 stars and wrote "Neither Harsha's experience in delivering engaging commercial films or Puneeth Rajkumar's onscreen presence could save Anjaniputra from its own basic sins."
