= N. S. Rajkumar =

South Indian film producer

N.S.Rajkumar
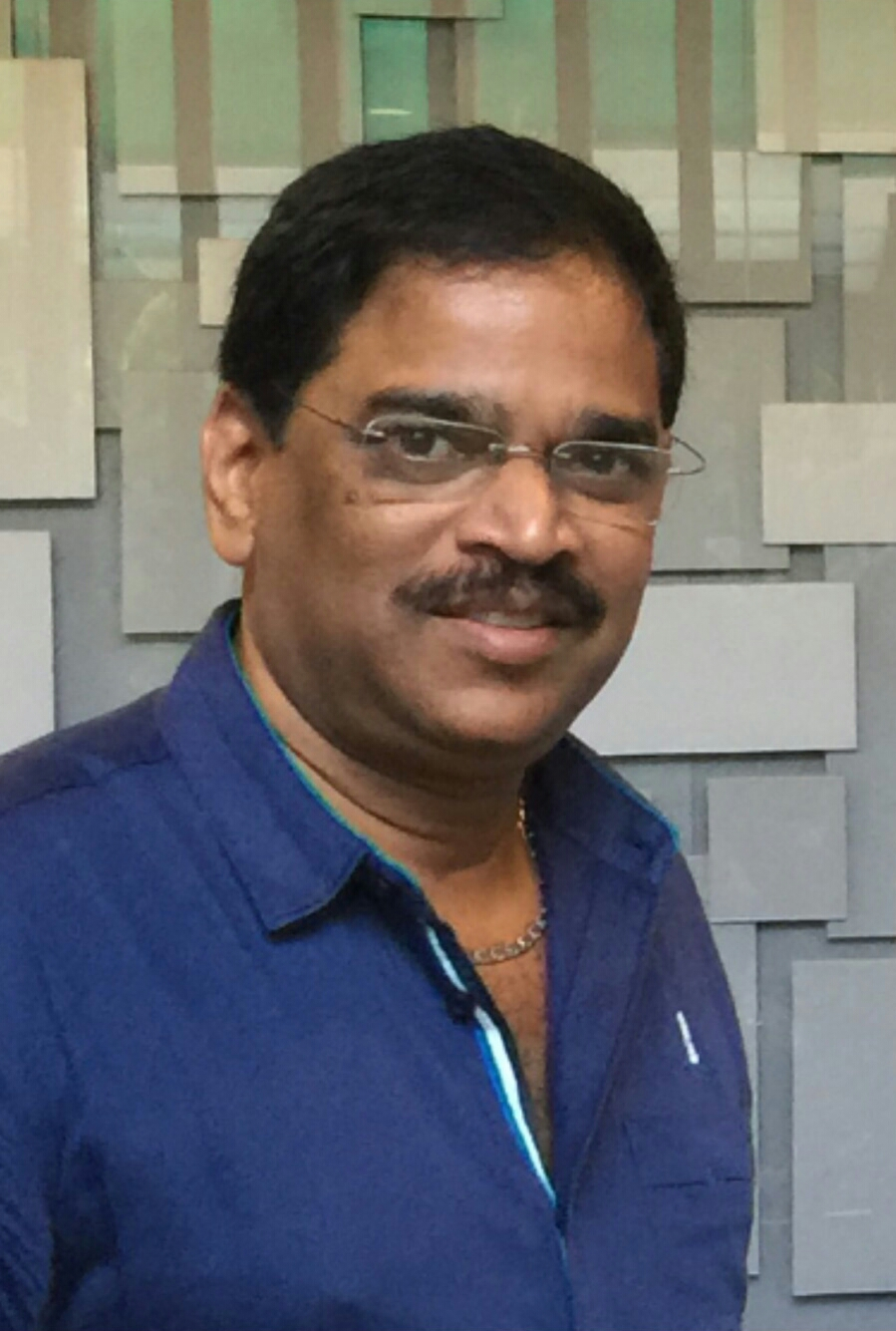
- N.S. Rajkumar
- Born: Nathella Sarath Rajkumar
- Occupations: Film producer, distributor
- Years active: 1997-present
- Spouse: Sujatha (m. 1993)
- Children: 2

N.S.Rajkumar is a South Indian film producer and distributor. He is mostly known for his regional Kannada language films, namely Myna and Mythri.

He has also received numerous Filmfare, SIIMA and Karnataka State Film awards and nominations for his works in the Kannada film industry.

== Personal life and career ==
Rajkumar has been working in the Kannada Film Industry for the past 40 years. He did his schooling at Kesari Higher Secondary School, Chennai. He initially entered the film industry as a production manager and assistant cameraman in the early 90s. After working in the industry as a technician, he ventured into producing Kannada serials, such as Thulasi, Godhooli and Vathsalya which ran successfully. After this, he produced his first debut movie Kaamannana Makkalu. In the following years he has collaborated with Puneeth Rajkumar on the films Prithvi and Mythri.

== Filmography ==
| Movie | Year |
|---|---|
| Kaamannana Makkalu | 2008 |
| Hatrick Hodi Maga | 2009 |
| Prithvi | 2010 |
| Myna | 2013 |
| Jatta | 2013 |
| Crazy Star | 2014 |
| Mythri | 2015 |
| Nataraja Service | 2016 |
| Kataka | 2017 |
| Girmit | 2019 |
| Kannadiga | 2021 |

== Awards ==
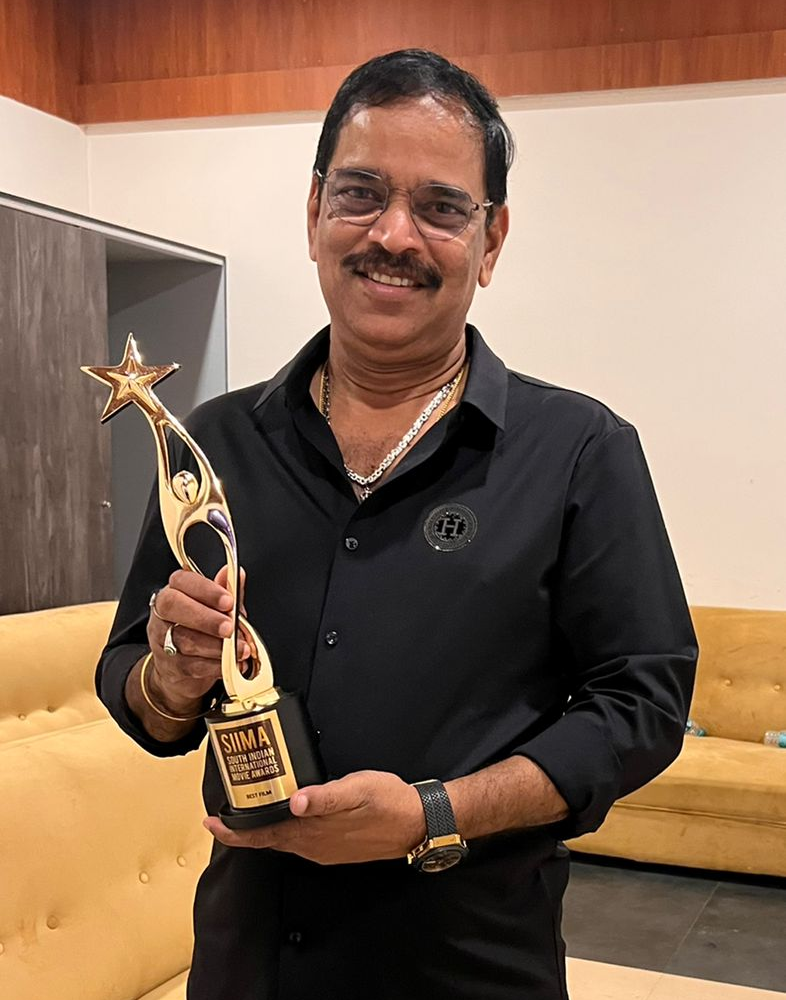
N.S. Rajkumar 2022 SIIMA awards

| Year | Award | Category | Work | Result | Ref. |
|---|---|---|---|---|---|
| 2014 | Filmfare Awards South | Best Film - Kannada | Myna | Won | |
| 2014 | South Indian International Movie Awards | Best Film - Kannada | Myna | Won | |
| 2014 | Karnataka State Film Awards | Second Best Film - Kannada | Jatta | Won | |
| 2016 | Karnataka State Film Awards | Third Best Film - Kannada | Mythri | Won | |
| 2016 | Filmfare Awards South | Best Film - Kannada | Mythri | Nominated | |
| 2016 | South Indian International Movie Awards | Best Film - Kannada | Mythri | Won | |
| 2022 | South Indian International Movie Awards | Special Appreciation Movie | Kannadiga | Won | |
