= Mythri (2015 film) =

2015 film by B. M. Giriraj

- Poster
- Directed by: Giriraj
- Written by: Giriraj
- Produced by: N. S. Rajkumar
- Starring: Mohanlal; Puneeth Rajkumar; Adithya Bharadwaj; Kalabhavan Mani; Ravi Kale; Sadhu Kokila; Archana; Sukrutha Wagle; Atul Kulkarni; Jagadish H. M.
- Cinematography: A. V. Krishna Kumar; Kiran
- Edited by: K. M. Prakash; Sagar Dass
- Music by: Ilaiyaraja
- Production company: Omkar Movies
- Distributed by: Kishore Films
- Release date: February 20, 2015
- Running time: 137 minutes
- Country: India
- Languages: Kannada; Malayalam

Mythri (transl. Alliance) is a 2015 Indian Malayalam and Kannada-language social drama film written and directed by Giriraj and produced by N. S. Rajkumar under the banner of Omkar Movies. It stars Mohanlal and Puneeth Rajkumar in extended cameo roles, and features Adithya Bharadwaj, Archana, Sukrutha Wagle and Atul Kulkarni in substantial roles and Sadhu Kokila's comedy performance elevates the viewing experience of the movie. Ilaiyaraaja scored the music for the film and Krishna Kumar handled the cinematography. The film is a social drama, and also focuses on relationships in the time of liberalisation. The film was declared a success at box-office.

Mythri was released worldwide on 20 February 2015 and garnered widespread critical acclaim. The film was praised for its strong and realistic plot, cast performance, cinematography and social message. Some critics called it one of the best films made in Kannada. The partially reshot Malayalam version titled My Hero Mythri was released on 12 June 2015 in Kerala. It had Kalabhavan Mani reprising the role played by Ravi Kale in the original, and also had Anu Joseph and Sajitha Betti in the additional scenes. The film won the Karnataka State Film Award for Third Best Film.

== Plot ==
Siddarama is a 10-year-old intelligent slum dweller, who lives with his mother, working in an agarbatti factory to make ends meet. One of Siddarama's pranks leads him into lock-up, and his mother requests help from Gooli Prathap/Kaala Pratapan, a pimp who runs a human trafficking business and also has political ambitions. Once Siddarama is released, Pratap sets his eyes on Siddarama's mother. Siddarama is also a huge fan of Puneeth Rajkumar and bunks classes in order to see Puneeth's film shooting.

During the shooting, he also gets a chance to interact with Puneeth and share his scrapbook. Later, Siddarama is in juvenile prison, whose warden is very strict, where he develops good relations with his fellow inmate Johnson; it is Johnson who sees Siddarama's potential to achieve big in life. Siddarama is encouraged by Johnson and gets selected to Karunada Kotyadipathi, hosted by Puneeth and being a step away from winning ₹1 crore (US$110,000).

After the show, Puneeth meets DRDO scientist Mahadev Ghodke, who requests him not to take the show further as Siddarama is the one who murdered his son. Shocked, Puneeth tells that it is not in his hands to do so. Mahadev expresses his unhappiness and walks away. Mahadev devises a plan to kill Gooli Prathap/Kaala Pratapan by devising a bomb and also reaches Pratap's cabinet office with the bomb. At the same time, Puneeth asks Siddarama the final question, which he is unable to answer.

Siddarama uses the Phone-a-friend option and calls Mahadev to help him with the answer. Without any prejudice, Mahadev gives the right answer, where Puneeth reveals about Siddarama's involvement in the murder of Mahadev's son. Distraught, Siddharama reveals that he didn't kill the boy and that Gooli Prathap/Kaala Pratapan's henchmen had killed the boy where he is forced by Gooli Prathap/Kaala Pratapan and his henchmen to take the blame. After learning this, Mahadev leaves the office, and the bomb detonates killing Gooli Prathap/Kaala Pratapan and his henchman, who were checking the contents of the suitcase. Mahadev then adopts Siddarama as his own son.

== Cast ==
- Mohanlal as Mahadev Godke, a DRDO Scientist (Special appearance)
- Puneeth Rajkumar as Himself (extended cameo appearance)
- Atul Kulkarni as Raviprakash
- Master Adithya Bharadwaj as Siddharama
- Jagadish H. M. as Johnson
- Archana as Mahadev's wife
- Sukrutha Wagle as Gooli Prathap's (Ravi Kale) wife
- Ravi Kale as Gooli Prathap
- Kalabhavan Mani as Kaala Pratapan (Malayalam version)
- Sadhu Kokila as Vignesh
- Sathyajith as Sathya
- Bhavana as Herself (Special appearance)

== Production ==
In April 2013, actor Mohanlal announced that his next project would be a Kannada film along with Puneeth Rajkumar by tweeting about it. Producer Rajkumar said that it will not be a full-fledged Puneeth film and Puneeth allotted a 20-day call sheet for the project. "Rajesh Nair, a close friend of Mohanlal helped us to get the actor into Sandalwood again. We will start shoot by next month, once Puneeth is back from his US trip", added the producer. The film was titled Mythri in July. The makers had zeroed in on Hindi film actress Radhika Apte, however, the actress had prior commitments because of which she couldn't act in the film. Archana was selected to play the female lead role opposite Mohanlal. Director Giriaj said that he was planning to rope in either Bhavana or Parvati Menon to play the other heroine role in the film. A few days later, Bhavana confirmed that she will be doing a special appearance in the film.

The first shot of the film was taken in May in a scene with actor V. Ravichandran filmed by Raghavendra Rajakumar. In July Mohanlal had completed his portion with Archana and Giriraj stated that 50 per cent of the shooting had been completed.

== Music ==
Mythri

Soundtrack album by Ilayaraaja
- Released: 16 January 2015
- Recorded: 2014
- Genre: Feature film soundtrack
- Length: 24:32
- Language: Kannada
- Label: Anand Audio
- Producer: Ilayaraaja

Ilayaraaja chronology
Shamitabh (2015)	Mythri (2015)	Rudramadevi (2015)
External audio
- Official Audio Jukebox on YouTube

Veteran music director Ilaiyaraaja has composed 5 songs for the film. The audio rights are sold to Anand Audio label. Mythri audio CD was released on 16 Jan 2015, Friday evening at Citadel Hotel in Bengaluru. Music Ilayaraja was present with actor Puneeth Rajakumar, directors Soori, Shashank, Nagshekhar, Giriraj, producer Vajreshwari Kumar and others on the dais. At the absence of Mohanlal he wished the team with a recorded video message shown at the function. Puneeth Rajkumar's daughters Drithi and Vanditha on Friday evening released the songs of the film which has been released by Anand Audio.

No.	Title	Lyrics	Singer(s)	Length
1.	"Hudugatave Hudukatavo"	Yogaraj Bhat	Monisha, Chorus	4:32
2.	"Idu Yaava Lokavo"	H. S. Venkateshamurthy	Ilaiyaraaja, Bhavatharini	4:47
3.	"Geluvu Onde Lekka"	Jayanth Kaikini	Anitha, Monisha, Nancy	4:42
4.	"Aakasha Meluntu"	Sharanya Gaonkar	Shravan, Monisha	5:01
5.	"Chandranenu Chanda"	Giriraj	Kailash Kher	5:32
6.	"Vishalavada Hrudaya"	Ilaiyaraaja	Ilaiyaraaja

== Reception ==
=== Critical reception ===
Mythri received overwhelmingly positive reviews from critics. Deccan Chronicle rated 4.5 out of 5 stars and called it "Brilliant" and "The best sandalwood movie in the recent times" praising the screenplay, acting and direction "Mythri has none of the so-called ‘must-haves’ – like heroism, fights, lavish sets, glamour, masala and more importantly item songs for a box office.", "Giriraj has penned the script with utmost care while balancing the storyline while depicting it through sheer artistic excellence". The New Indian Express called it as "A feel good movie of our times" and said "This realistic film is important because of its combination of a social message with universal appeal" and stated "Mythri is one of the most sensible and a feel-good Kannada films in recent times. Giriraj's film's strengths lie in its narrative force combined with elements of joy, suspense and reality along with the overall vision of the director and the energy of the actors. The film boasts a good starcast with great music by Ilayaraaja" and praised its camera work, editing and cast performances including the kids. "The real star of the film is the content that creates a contrast between the rich and the poor. With the summer holidays just weeks away, Mythri can be one of the best holiday films for the entire family".

The Times of AP rated 4.5 out of 5 stars and elaborated "Mythri is a strong script about the life a junevile. Focusing on the dreadful social problems, Giriraj has wrote a wonderful story." "It is for the first time Puneeth Rajkumar is seen as an actor in a movie. Mohanlal is at his best in his character, Mohanlal and Veda Sastry's pairing up as a couple is feast for the viewers." "Mythri is a full package. It has good cinematography and very well written screenplay. The movie gets a ‘thumbs up' for its technical aspects. Mythri has been successful to show the cruel reality of the society. Overall, Mythri is a best movie which ends with a special and a strong message to society". Also praised the music from Ilayaraaja. Bangalore Mirror rated 4.5 out of 5 stars and said "Mythri is one of the most sensible films Sandalwood has churned out in recent years". And called it "A bond that lasts forever". "There is no masala elements, and yet Mythri is not an art film that was made for awards. It is silver screen magic in its truest sense that does not treat audience as dumb people who seem to be in need for superlative stimulants". "Giriraj chooses his subjects and characters well. Unlike regular commercial film-makers, he shows reality in human form. Giriraj deserves all the applause for his conviction and narrative style. This one is a total delight".

The Hans India called it "A very realistic take on life showcasing present day challenges. Watch it for Puneeth and Mohanlal's stellar performances. Dialogues are a big plus.". And praised its music, social message for parents and youngsters and the plot. The Times of India rated 4.5 out of 5 stars and said "Mythri is worth watching. After Jatta, director B M Giriraj and producer Rajkumar are back with another masterpiece. Highlighting the life of children of a lesser god, Giriraj has packed the movie with sentiments and action sprinkled with humour to make it appealing to all types of audience". Also praised the music from Ilayaraaja, cast performances and A. V Krishnakumar's camera work. The Hindu stated "It is undoubtedly one of the most sensible films made in Kannada cinema in recent years. 'Mythri' can be described as an attempt to silence those who argue that Kannada film is like stagnant water and that there are no experimental scripts. Still it's not an art film, 'Mythri' is a model of a perfect blend of art and commercial elements."

NamCinema.com rated 4.5 out of 5 stars and concluded that "On the whole there are certain movies which give feel good factor when watched and Mythri surely is one such movie. Such movies should be made in future so that the positive intent of such movies should creep into people even if it means one or two would watch" Cochin Talkies rated the movie 4.14 out of 5 and wrote: "Mythri is really a thought provoking film and a class act which you can't miss. We spend lots of money to see other language films which are just masala entertainers and nothing much, specially from Kannada or Telugu. But Mythri is a change for you, a real change and we mean it. Go for it and don't miss it."

=== Box office ===
The film was released in 250 theatres across Karnataka. The opening day collection was ₹1.75 crore (US$190,000) in the state. The film registered an average 70% occupancy in multiplexes and 80—90% occupancy in single screens in the Friday morning shows. According to International Business Times, the film received good collections in the opening weekend. The rush of female audience in the first week was a big surprise in Karnataka, usually they are seen from the third week. The film completed 150 days run in Karnataka.

=== Awards ===
- Karnataka State Film Award for Third Best Film (2015) — N. S. Rajkumar
