= Ravi Basrur =

Indian music composer and director

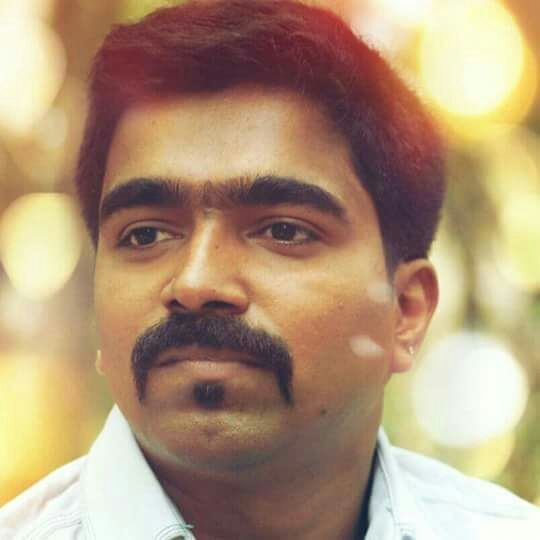
- Ravi Basrur in 2018

Background information
- Born: 1 January 1984 (age 42); Basrur, Kundapura taluk, Udupi district, Karnataka, India
- Genres: Film score, soundtrack
- Occupations: Music composer; sound designer; lyricist; singer; director; producer
- Instruments: Rhythm percussion, keyboard, vocals
- Years active: 2014–present
- Label: Ravi Basrur Music
- Website: www.ravibasrurmusic.com

Ravi Basrur is an Indian music composer, lyricist and director who mostly works in the Kannada film industry. He is known for his collaborations with director Prashanth Neel, with whom he debuted in Ugramm. His most famous works as a composer are K.G.F: Chapter 1, K.G.F: Chapter 2, Salaar: Part 1 – Ceasefire and Marco.

He has also directed the films Gargar Mandala and Girmit.

== Early life ==
He was born as Kiran in Basrur, Kundapur, a coastal town in Karnataka state. He changed his name to Ravi for movies in respect for a person who supported him to buy a musical keyboard in his early struggling days which changed his life completely.

== Career ==
Ravi Basrur debuted by scoring music for the film Ugramm. Following his debut, he composed music for films such as Ekka Saka (2015), Just Maduveli (2015), Karvva (2016), K.G.F: Chapter 1 (2018) and K.G.F: Chapter 2 (2022).

He was also nominated for a Filmfare Awards South award for Best Music Director for this film. His other projects include the Prashant Neel directorial Salaar, Salman Khan's Kisi Ka Bhai Kisi Ki Jaan, and Unni Mukundan's Marco.

== Discography ==
=== As music composer ===
Year	Film	Language	Notes	Ref.
2011	Panak Makkal	Kannada		
2014	Ugramm	Kannada		
2014	Gargar Mandala	Kannada	Also director	
2015	Just Maduveli	Kannada		
2015	Goolihatti	Kannada	Background Score Only	
2015	Ekka Saka	Tulu	Debut in Tulu cinema	
2015	Mrugashira	Kannada		
2015	Rathaavara	Kannada	Background Score Only	
2015	Ring Master	Kannada		
2015	Ugraa Prathapi	Kannada		
2016	Tyson	Kannada	2 songs and background score	
2016	Karvva	Kannada	Background Score only	
2017	Bilindar	Kannada	Also director	
2017	Vaira	Kannada		
2017	Kataka	Kannada		
2017	Mufti	Kannada		
2017	Mantram	Kannada	Background Score only	
2017	Anjani Putra	Kannada		
2018	Samhaara	Kannada		
2018	Rajannana Maga	Kannada		
2018	Bhootayyana Mommaga Ayyu	Kannada		
2018	Umil	Tulu		
2018	K.G.F: Chapter 1	Kannada		
2019	Bazaar	Kannada		
2019	Marshal	Telugu	Debut in Telugu cinema; background Score only	
2019	Girmit	Kannada		
2021	Kannadiga	Kannada		
2021	100	Kannada		
2021	Singa Paarvai	Tamil		
2021	Antim: The Final Truth	Hindi	Debut in Hindi cinema	
2021	Madhagaja	Kannada		
2021	Muddy	Malayalam	Debut in Malayalam cinema	
2022	Abbara	Kannada		
2022	K.G.F: Chapter 2	Kannada		
2022	Sasanasabha	Telugu	Music director	
2023	Kabzaa	Kannada		
2023	Bholaa	Hindi		
2023	Kisi Ka Bhai Kisi Ki Jaan	Hindi	2 songs; also credited as co-lyricist Background score	
2023	Chatrapathi	Hindi	Background score only	
2023	Kshetrapati	Kannada		
2023	Abhiramachandra	Kannada	Also presenter	
2023	Salaar: Part 1 – Ceasefire	Telugu		
2024	Bhimaa	Telugu		
2024	Aho Vikramaarka	Telugu		
2024	Martin	Kannada	Background Score only	
2024	Singham Again	Hindi		
2024	Bhairathi Ranagal	Kannada		
2024	Zebra	Telugu		
2024	Marco	Malayalam		
2025	Shanmukha	Telugu		
2025	Veera Chandrahasa	Kannada	Also director	
2026	Blast	Tamil	Debut in Tamil cinema	
2026	Kattalan	Malayalam		
2026	Toxic	Kannada; English		
2026	Drishyam: The Conclusion	Hindi	Two songs only.	
2026	Cult	Telugu		
2026	Maatrubhumi: May War Rest in Peace †	Hindi	Background score only.	
2027	Force 3	Hindi	Filming	
2027	Tiki Taka †	Malayalam		
2027	Dragon †	Telugu	Filming	
2028	Kaaliyan †	Malayalam	Announced	

=== As singer ===
Year	Song	Film	Composer(s)	Ref.
2011	"Appaiya Kanee"	Panak Makkal	Ravi Basrur |	
2011	"Halai Hothneno"	Panak Makkal	Ravi Basrur |	
2011	"Niddi Bathilla"	Panak Makkal	Ravi Basrur |	
2011	"Yentha Henne"	Panak Makkal	Ravi Basrur |	
2014	"Yentha Chandha Namm Bhashi"	Gargar Mandala	Ravi Basrur |	
2014	"Kathli Kattadh Aata Kani"	Gargar Mandala	Ravi Basrur |	
2014	"Payatig Hooi Meen Takabani"	Gargar Mandala	Ravi Basrur |	
2014	"Undadi Gunda"	Gargar Mandala	Ravi Basrur |	
2014	"Hyangu Halaith Naav"	Gargar Mandala	Ravi Basrur |	
2014	"Gar Gar Mandla"	Gargar Mandala	Ravi Basrur |	
2015	"Kadala Magalu - Bit"	Mrugashira	Ravi Basrur |	
2015	"Bangiranga"	Ring Master	Ravi Basrur |	
2015	"Bisiyusira"	Ring Master	Ravi Basrur |	
2016	"Yegalu"	Bilindar	Ravi Basrur |	
2016	"Jeenva Eega"	Bilindar	Ravi Basrur |	
2016	"Amma Ninna"	Bilindar	Ravi Basrur |	
2016	"Kaala Kettoith"	Bilindar	Ravi Basrur |	
2017	"Anjani putra"	Anjani Putra	Ravi Basrur |	
2017	"Chanda Chanda"	Anjani Putra	Ravi Basrur |	
2017	"Chanooranu"	Mufti	Ravi Basrur |	
2017	"Onti Salaga"	Mufti	Ravi Basrur |	
2017	"Rajahuli - Theme"	Samhaara	Ravi Basrur |	
2018	"Bhootayyana Mommaga Ayyu"	Bhootayyana Mommaga Ayyu	Ravi Basrur |	
2019	"Masana Seroythu"	Bazaar	Ravi Basrur |	
2021	"Koi Toh Aayega"	Antim: The Final Truth (Hindi)	Ravi Basrur |	
2022	"Toofan"	K.G.F: Chapter 2	Ravi Basrur |	
2022	"Sulthana"	K.G.F: Chapter 2	Ravi Basrur |	
2022	"Chola Chola"	Ponniyin Selvan: I (Kannada)	A. R. Rahman	
2023	"Kisi Ka Bhai Kisi Ki Jaan - Theme Song"	Kisi Ka Bhai Kisi Ki Jaan	Ravi Basrur	

== Filmography ==
=== As director ===
Year	Film	Director	Producer	Writer	Notes
2014	Gargar Mandala	Yes	Yes	Yes	Directorial debut, Kundagannada film
2016	Bilinder	Yes	Yes	Yes	Lead actor, Kundagannada film
2017	Kataka	Yes	No	Yes	
2019	Girmit	Yes	No	Yes	
2024	Kadal	Yes	Yes	Yes	
2025	Veer Chandrahasa	Yes	Yes	Yes	Also co-producer

=== As lyricist ===
Year	Film	Song	Music Director
2026	Blast	"I Want Everything"	himself

== Awards and nominations ==
Film	Award	Category	Result	Ref
Ugramm	4th SIIMA Awards	Best Background Score Kannada	Won	
Ugramm	62nd Filmfare Awards South	Best Music Director	Nominated	
Kataka	7th South Indian International Movie Awards	Best Debut Director	Nominated	
Anjani Putra	7th South Indian International Movie Awards	Best Playback Singer - Male	Won	
Anjani Putra	65th Filmfare Awards South	Best Music Director	Nominated	
K.G.F: Chapter 1	2018 Karnataka State Film Awards	Best Music Director	Won	
K.G.F: Chapter 1	Zee Kannada Hemmeya Kanndiga Awards 2019	Best Music Director	Won	
K.G.F: Chapter 1	8th SIIMA Awards	Best Music	Won	
K.G.F: Chapter 1	66th Filmfare Awards South	Best Music Director – Kannada	Nominated	
