= Kataka (film) =

- Film poster
- Directed by: Ravi Basrur
- Written by: Ravi Basrur
- Produced by: N. S. Rajkumar
- Starring: Ashok Raj; Spandana Prasad; Shlaga Saligrama; Bala Rajwadi
- Cinematography: Sachin Basrur
- Edited by: Ravi Basrur
- Music by: Ravi Basrur
- Production company: Omkar Movies
- Distributed by: KRG Studios
- Release date: 13 October 2017
- Running time: 107 minutes
- Country: India
- Language: Kannada

Kataka (transl. Crab or Cancer) is a 2017 Kannada horror film, written and directed by Ravi Basrur. The film marks Basrur's directing debut, which is based on a number of true incidents that occurred in the coastal region of Karnataka.

Kataka has been dubbed into 15 languages and is the first Kannada film to be dubbed into English. The film portrays real-life scenarios (culture of coastal India) with a horror-like ambiance.

== Plot ==
Tired of the hustle and bustle of city life, Kumar returns to his native village along with his wife Vandhana and their four-year-old daughter Kavya. Though having to leave at the age of four following his mother's death, he has always loved his village and its culture—eventually bringing him back.

With the help of his uncle and a childhood friend, Kumar plans to start a school in the village to provide better education for its children. However, an ancient curse is placed on his family after his daughter unwittingly touches an enchanted item. Challenges and obstacles thus begin to appear along the way, which Kumar finds difficulty in coping with. By each passing day, his enemies multiply along with his struggles. The film thereby follows Kumar as he deals with these dilemmas.

== Cast ==
- Ashok Raj as Kumar
- Spandana Prasad as Vandhana
- Shlagha Saligrama as Kavya
- Bala Rajwadi as Neelakantashastri
- Madhav Karkada as Appu a.k.a. Subraaya
- Ugramm Manju as Prabhakara Nambudiri
- Om Guru as Guru
- Vijay Basrur as Neelakanta Karaba

== Soundtrack ==
Kataka

Soundtrack album by Ravi Basrur
- Released: 29 July 2017
- Recorded: 2017
- Studio: Omkar Movies
- Genre: Feature film soundtrack
- Length: 4:33
- Label: Ravi Basrur Music
- Producer: Ravi Basrur

Ravi Basrur chronology
Vaira (2017)	Kataka (2017)	Mufti (2017)

Track list

No.	Title	Lyrics	Singer(s)	Length
1.	"Kataka Title Track"	Sachin Basrur	Arjun Janya, BJ Bharat, Chandan Shetty, V. Sridhar, Charan Raj, Veer Samarth	2:06
2.	"Yake Kannu Eege"	Sachin Basrur	Anuradha Bhat, Supriya Lohith, Manasa Holla, Ananya Bhat	2:27

== Release ==
The film had a limited release on 13 October 2017 in 13 languages, including Kannada, English, Tamil, Telugu, Malayalam, Kodava, Hindi, Punjabi, Beary, Assamese, Konkani, and Marathi.

Kataka was the first Kannada movie to be dubbed in English.

=== Sequel ===
Ravi Basrur has announced plans to direct a sequel, albeit with new actors while retaining most of his original technical team. The plot, however, will not be a direct continuation of the first film.

== Reception and awards ==
The film received positive reviews from critics and audiences.

Along with the direction of Ravi Basrur, Shlagha Saligrama has been praised for a notable performance. Saligrama won the 2017 Karnataka State Film Award for Best Child Actor (Female) and the SIIMA Special Award for Best Child Artist. Ravi Basrur was nominated for the SIIMA Award for Best Debut Director in the Kannada category, but lost to Tharun Sudhir for his work in chowka.
