= Saakshyam =

- Theatrical release poster
- Directed by: Sriwass
- Written by: Sriwass
- Dialogues by: Sai Madhav Burra
- Produced by: Abhishek Nama
- Starring: Bellamkonda Sreenivas; Pooja Hegde; Jagapathi Babu
- Cinematography: Arthur A. Wilson
- Edited by: Kotagiri Venkateswara Rao
- Music by: Harshavardhan Rameshwar
- Production company: Abhishek Pictures
- Distributed by: Eros International; Red Heart Movies
- Release date: 27 July 2018
- Running time: 164 minutes
- Country: India
- Language: Telugu
- Box office: est. ₹22.7 crore

Saakshyam (transl. Witness) is a 2018 Indian Telugu-language fantasy action film written and directed by Sriwass, and produced by Abhishek Pictures. The film stars Bellamkonda Sreenivas, Pooja Hegde and Jagapathi Babu. The plot depicts Viswa (Bellamkonda Sreenivas), a wealthy NRI, who falls in love with Soundarya Lahari (Pooja Hegde) and follows her to India but gets tangled up in issues involving her family. Over time, he realizes that nature itself has guided him back to his homeland to fulfill a greater mission.

The film was officially launched in May 2017. Principal photography began in July of the same year at a set at Ramoji Film City, Hyderabad, with filming taking place in Tamil Nadu, Varanasi, Karnataka, Dubai, New York City, Grand Canyon and New Jersey. It was scored by Harshavardhan Rameshwar, with cinematography by Arthur A. Wilson, production design by A. S. Prakash and editing by Kotagiri Venkateswara Rao.

Saakshyam was theatrically released on 27 July 2018, and it was considered an overall success at the box office. It received mixed reviews from critics, with praise for the VFX, dialogue, direction, lead casts performances, concept, music, background score and action sequences, while criticism was directed towards the screenplay.

== Plot ==
A mob attempts to seize a cow and her calf, and several people try to pursue them. Meanwhile, at Raju Garu’s home, the family is assembled for his son’s naming ceremony. Suddenly, the same people from the mob arrive and reveal that Munuswamy’s brothers have abducted the mother cow—one that belonged to the temple—along with many others. Incensed, Raju Garu confronts Munuswamy’s brother, rescues the cattle, and returns them home.

The news of his brothers' humiliation reaches Munuswamy, and he and his three brothers go to Raju Garu's house, where the celebration is going on. They brutally kill every member of the family, except for Raju Garu's wife, who is injured. Raju Garu manages to distract the brothers while his wife runs away with the child, but she becomes weak and is unable to continue due to her deep injuries. Just then, the calf whose mother was saved by Raju Garu comes and stands in front of his wife. She takes this as a sign, wraps the child in a shawl, and ties him onto the calf. Munuswamy and his brothers arrive just in time to see the calf running away, Munuswamy's second brother slit Raju Guru's Wife's throat to death and a chase ensues. The injured calf manages to evade Munuswamy and land the baby on a truck carrying soil. The villains see the child falling down the cliff and believe him to be dead. In order to conceal their crime, they set fire to the cowshed, because of the belief that even animals can become a witness to their sins.

The story then goes into a narration where the narrator explains that even though Munuswamy is happy that he has destroyed every witness to his crime, he has forgotten that the five elements of nature that are present everywhere have witnessed his crimes and will surely do justice for his atrocities.

Meanwhile, the child is carried to a soil mine, where the truck dumps him along with the soil. A Hindu saint sees the child, takes him to Kasi, and leaves him in a temple. A childless couple, Siva Prasad and his wife, are there to pray for a child and are overwhelmed to see him. The temple priest names him Viswaagna because it is nature's order for them to raise the child. Later, the couple leaves for the United States with the child.

20 years later, Siva Prasad and his wife are shown to be celebrating the success of their company. A reporter asks about their son Viswa, who would be taking over the multibillion-dollar empire, but Siva Prasad states that Viswa is not interested in taking over the business as he is interested in developing games. Viswa and his friend are shown to be in the process of developing a new video game, which they are sending to a company to be released.

Unfortunately, their game is rejected due to a lack of culture. Viswa and his friend run into a girl named Soundarya Lahari, a Hindu spiritual preacher who came to the US to preach on Indian mythology. Viswa is instantly smitten, so he and his friend follow her to get her help in adding cultural elements to their game. However, Soundarya is offended by their offer of money and says flatly that culture is not something to be sold. Viswa and his friend help Soundarya's sister and brother-in-law secure jobs using his influence, which leads to Soundarya reluctantly agreeing to help Viswa.

She introduces the group to Valmiki, her childhood friend and an IT professional who has an interest in Indian mythology. He helps by giving them a unique idea for a game which resembles Viswa's life story, about a boy whose entire family was killed by villains and the five elements of nature taking revenge on the villains through the boy. Viswa is impressed by Valmiki's idea and hires him to develop the game.

Soundarya simultaneously leaves for India to see her father Tagore, who is bedridden because of Munuswamy's gang after fighting against them in court. Viswa follows her to India and starts developing the video game there.

Meanwhile, Munuswamy is ordered to kill Soundarya as a warning to Tagore. Later, in multiple scenarios, Soundarya is saved by Viswa from Veeraswamy, Munuswamy's first brother. Viswa eventually kills Veeraswamy by using the elements of air and earth, and is shocked to discover that the events of his video game are playing out in real life. When he goes to Kashi, to give salutations from his mother's side to Kashi Vishwanath temple, he accidentally meets the second brother of Munuswamy, who he kills using the element of fire. Viswa tries his best to stop it, but fails. Meanwhile, Munuswamy is on the search for his brothers' killer.

Soundarya begins to reciprocate Viswa's love because of his efforts to save her from Munuswamy's brother and agrees to marry him. Meanwhile, Valmiki designs the full game and comes back to India and meets his grandfather who is practicing Vedic astrology and was both looking for the bad omens of Munuswamy and his brothers and fixing the marriage dates of Viswa and Soundarya.

After hearing Valmiki's game concept, Valmiki's grandfather understands that this is the vengeance against Munuswamy and his brothers by Mother Nature because of their sins against Viswa's biological family. He remembers that in front of young Valmiki, a younger Munuswamy and his brothers criticized the astrologer and denies God to live on their own terms. He reveals to Valmiki that this screenplay was written by Mother Nature through him. She witnessed all the incidents and selected him to design the situation they are in, and it cannot be stopped by anyone.

Meanwhile, Viswa's business rival, Shakti, joins hands with Munuswamy to take over his major stakes in India and abducts Viswa, threatening him to give them the shares documents. Viswa comes to a deal with them and all the elements take revenge on Shakti and Munuswamy's gang through Viswa as witnessed by the Sky.

== Cast ==
- Bellamkonda Sreenivas as Viswaagna "Viswa"
- Pooja Hegde as Soundarya Lahari
- Jagapathi Babu as Munuswamy
- Ravi Kishan as Veeraswamy, Munuswamy's first brother
- Ashutosh Rana as Munuswamy's second brother
- Madhu Guruswamy as Munuswamy's third brother
- Kabir Duhan Singh as Viswa's business rival
- Jayaprakash as Siva Prasad, Viswa's adopted father
- Pavithra Lokesh as Viswa's adopted mother
- Vennela Kishore as Viswa's friend
- Rao Ramesh as Tagore, Soundarya's father
- Posani Krishna Murali as Defense Lawyer
- Sameer as Raju Garu's brother
- Jhansi as Soundarya's sister
- Brahmaji as Soundarya's brother-in-law
- Krishna Bhagavaan as Soundarya's paternal uncle
- Hema as Soundarya's aunt
- Annapoorna as Soundarya's grandmother
- Raghu Babu as Siva Prasad's assistant
- Mahadevan as Munuswamy's aide
- Kasi Vishwanath as Advocate Murthy
- Surya as Hindu Saint
- Ananth Babu as Priest

Extended cameo appearance

- Ananta Sriram as Valmiki, a game designer

Cameo appearances

- Sarath Kumar as Raju Garu, Viswa's biological father
- Meena as Viswa's biological mother
- Sri Pusapati as Sri, a Cognos developer

== Production ==
=== Development ===
In February 2017, it was reported that Bellamkonda Sreenivas would collaborate with director Sriwass for his next project. Sriwass narrated the script to Bellamkonda Sreenivas a couple of months before the release of Jaya Janaki Nayaka (2017). In the first narration itself, Sreenivas liked it and agreed to the project. Writer Sai Madhav Burra was signed for the dialogues of the film. The film was produced by Abhishek Nama under his banner Abhishek Pictures.

On the story, Sriwass said "This is going to be my sixth film. Its story and script is going to be completely different from my previous films. It is written keeping the changing trends in mind, and to suit all sections."

The film's launch event with a puja ceremony was held on 21 May 2017 at Ramanaidu Studios, which saw the attendance of noted personalities from the Telugu film industry. Sriwass' daughter Vedaswa handed over the script while Raghava Lawrence switched on the camera. Director V. V. Vinayak sounded the clapboard while director Boyapati Srinu took the first shot on Sreenivas.

Sreenivas said "Once I greenlighted Saakshyam, I didn't accept any other project. Since the movie has significant action sequences, I wanted to give my best. I went to Dubai to get physically trained". A. S. Prakash served as the production designer for the film. Prior to starting the first shooting schedule, the team constructed a set at Ramoji Film City in Hyderabad, for filming an action sequence.

In May 2017, Devi Sri Prasad was reported as composing the music for the film, but Harshavardhan Rameshwar was signed as the music director. Other technicians includes cinematographer Arthur A. Wilson, editor Kotagiri Venkateswara Rao, production designer A. S. Prakash, stunt director Peter Hein, and costume designers Nischay Niyogi and Neeta Lulla, and dance choreographers Shobi Paulraj, Raghu, and Bhanu.

=== Themes ===
According to Bellamkonda Sreenivas, the story revolves around the five elements (Panchamahabhuta) – Earth, Water, Air, Fire and Aether.

About the theme, director Sriwass said "I was inspired by life. It has always been my aim to make movies in different genres and all my films have been like that so far. Saakshyam, however, is a multi-genre film which will explore five different themes with drastically different backdrops."

"There's been a lot of talk about Saakshyam being a horror thriller. That's not true. There are no supernatural elements as such — let's just say, the story incorporates five elements of nature that we all experience in our everyday life, into its screenplay", Sreenivas on the story of the film.

=== Casting ===
Bellamkonda Sreenivas plays the video game developer and designer in the film. Sreenivas trained in BMX racing, flyboarding and jet skiing for his character in the film. In June 2017, Pooja Hegde was confirmed to play the female lead. Hegde portraits a middle class Brahmin girl from a traditional and conservative family. The makers were confident that she would do full justice to the role. It was reported that her outfits in the film were going to be the highlight of the film. Neeta Lulla designed her costumes in the film. About playing a spiritual leader in the film, Hegde said "I have always focused on the character than my look."

Jagapathi Babu was signed to play the role of the main antagonist in the film. Ravi Kishan, Ashutosh Rana, Sarath Kumar, Meena, Jayaprakash, Pavitra Lokesh, Brahmaji, Madhu Guruswamy, and Vennela Kishore were also roped in to play supporting roles in the film.

=== Filming ===
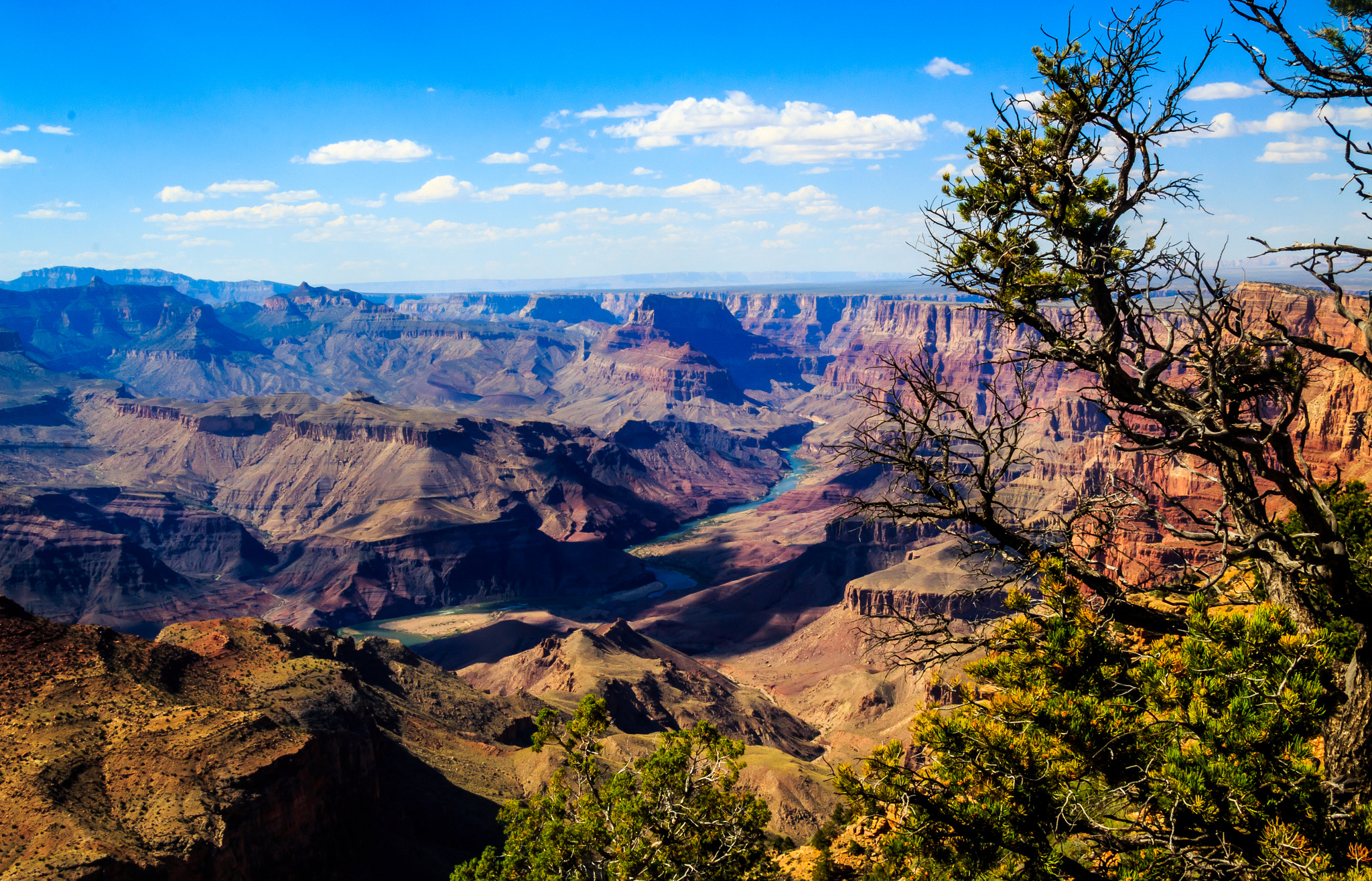
Grand Canyon, where parts of the film were shot

Principal photography of the film commenced on 12 June 2017 in Hyderabad at a specially erected set at Ramoji Film City. The 10-day schedule was concluded in late 2017. The second schedule of the film was filmed in July 2017. In August 2017, a lavish set was constructed at Pollachi, Tamil Nadu designed by A. S. Prakash to shoot a third schedule at a village. A high-octane interval episode featuring Srinivas, Hegde was shot in this schedule, which ended on 12 September 2017. With this forty percentage of the film's shoot was over.

Filming resumed at Varanasi on 21 September 2017, where the team shot action sequences. Few scenes were also shot at Tulsi Ghat, Varanasi and at the temple. Varanasi schedule was wrapped up on 3 October. A 15-day schedule began in mid-October 2017 at Hampi and Hospet, Karnataka, where the team shot action sequences choreographed by Peter Hein. On 6 November 2017, the schedule was wrapped at Hospet near Bellary, Karnataka featuring Srinivas, Hegde and 200 other artists.

In December 2017, the production moved to Dubai to shoot the introductory song and a few crucial scenes. Some scenes featuring Pooja Hegde, Jayaprakash, Pavitra Lokesh and Vennela Kishore were shot in this schedule. In early January 2018, Srinivas revealed that "seventy-five percent of the film's shoot is done. Except for three songs and climax episode, entire shoot part is completed. We are planning to kick-start the climax shoot from this month end and have later planned a New York schedule to shoot three songs."

The filming of the climax scenes began in February 2018. Action director Peter Hein choreographed few climax sequences that took place on a huge set in Ramoji Film City, Hyderabad.

Final schedule of the film was shot in the US, with Sreenivas, Pooja Hegde and Vennela Kishore in April 2018. The 15-day USA schedule was done at locations in New York City, the Grand Canyon and New Jersey. "We are going to explore some exotic locales in US which haven't been shown before in Telugu films. It is going to be a visual feast" A song featuring and Hegde shot in this schedule. In late April 2018, a 15-minute dance sequence featuring Sreenivas and Hegde was shot on a busy street in New York City. Hegde practised for hours to get her moves right. Principal photography was wrapped up by late-April 2018, with filming having lasted 160 working days.

"We couldn't have shot in Hyderabad what should be shot in Kaasi. I can't cheat the audience. The media started talking about the making values right after the teaser was out", Abhishek Nama on making of the film.

=== Post-production ===
Post-production of the film began simultaneously with the wrapping-up and continuation of film production. Pete Draper and Alan Badger Brayshaw served as the visual effects supervisor of the film, along with Makuta VFX, Pixelloid, Work Flow Studios, Knack Studios and the EFX, the film's principal visual effects studio. Over 400 technically skilled artists worked for the film. Extensive visual effects work took place for several months during the post-production process. Hari Haran and Sachin Sudhakaran worked on sound design and IGENE handled the digital intermediate. Ranga did the colouring for the film.

The final copy of the film was ready by late July 2018, and was submitted to the Central Board of Film Certification (CBFC) that month. According to the reports, the censor board was not willing to certify the film as they reportedly believed that many birds and animals were hurt during the shooting of the film. The producers clarified that no birds or animals were hurt during the making of the film and everything has been shot in CGI. Later, on 24 July 2018, the film received a U/A certificate from the Censor Board, with a finalised runtime of 164 minutes.

== Music ==
The soundtrack of this film is composed by Harshavardhan Rameshwar. All the lyrics are written by Ananta Sriram. The music was released on Junglee Music. The complete audio was released on 7 July 2018 in Hyderabad.

The soundtrack consists of the songs "Design Your Destiny", "Ishq Karle", "Soundarya Lahari", "Dung Dung Dung Dung", "Shivam Shivam", "Cheliya Choode", "Bhava Maaya", "Thatra Gandhavathi Pruthvi", "Om Agnirwa Apa", "Sapdha Gunakam" and "Gange Jayamu". The songs were trending on all FM stations and charts.

== Marketing ==
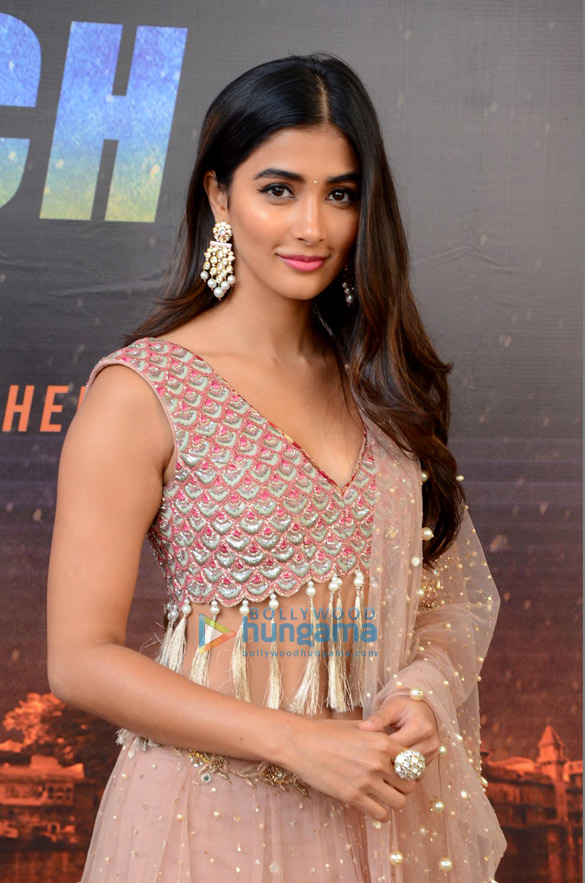
Pooja Hegde at Saakshyam motion poster launch, in October 2017

The title logo of the film was revealed on 18 October 2017, through a forty-five second motion poster, coinciding Diwali. The motion poster showcases the five elements inside a giant eye. The motion poster launch event was held on the same day in Hyderabad, with the film's cast and crew present at the event. The first look of the film featuring Srinivas and Hegde was released on 14 February 2018, coinciding Valentine's Day. Later, on 18 April 2018 the film's official teaser trailer was released, which received a good response. The film's theatrical trailer was released at an audio launch event on 7 July 2018 and later on social medias.

== Release ==
=== Theatrical ===
Saakshyam was theatrically released on 27 July 2018. The film was released by Eros International globally. Red Heart Movies released the film in North America. Dil Raju acquired the distribution rights of the film in Nizam (Telangana) region.

=== Home media ===
The film's digital rights were acquired by ZEE5 and Zee Network acquired the satellite rights of the Telugu version. The deal of satellite rights was reported to be ₹13.5 crore (US$1.4 million). The original Telugu-language version of the film was premiered on television on 23 September 2018 on Zee Telugu. The film premiered on ZEE5 on 27 December 2018.

The Hindi dubbed version titled Pralay: The Destroyer premiered on Zee Cinema on 15 November 2020. The film was later telecasted on & Pictures on 18 March 2022. The film was later dubbed and released in Tamil in 2022.

== Reception ==
=== Critical response ===
Saakshyam received mixed reviews. Critics praised its VFX, dialogue, direction, lead cast performances, concept, music, background score, and action sequences, but criticized the screenplay.

123 Telugu rated the film 3 out of 5 and wrote, "On the whole, Saakshyam is a regular action entertainer with an interesting theme. As long as the superb fights and mass elements take center stage, things look good. The mass audience will surely love the film as it has been packed with good episodes which will keep them entertained."

Murali Krishna C H of The New Indian Express wrote "Bellamkonda achieves believability with a graceful, restrained performance. Pooja Hegde gets more screen time in this film compared to her last outing DJ and she does a good job. Jagapati Babu makes a menacing Munuswamy and he is aided well by Ravi Kishan and Ashutosh Rana."

In his review, Krishna Sripada of The News Minute wrote "Sriwass' fantasy tale tells the story of how Vishwa, whose entire family was wiped out in a violent massacre, gets his revenge".

Vyas of The Hans India reviewed the film and wrote "The major highlight of the film is definitely the striking visuals by the cinematographer. The first half has a lot of comedy, a romance which entertains the audience. The second half lacks a bit of pace and embedded a lot of action sequences. Though the second half is a little bit boring when compared the first half, the spectacular visuals and backgrounds engage the viewers well."

Varaprasad Makireddy of Samayam Telugu opined "The movie is definitely new. If not, it would have been better if it had been shown better. All in all the theater goer is satisfied. If you enjoy the movie without looking for logic, you will definitely like it." Jeevi of Idlebrain.com write "Saakshyam is a large canvas film with a different concept and an innovative use of Karma and nature's elements. The film starts off really well with high energy killing sequence and hero riding on calf."

=== Box office ===
Saakshyam grossed ₹22.7 crore (US$2.4 million) in its theatrical run. It was a success at the box office.
