= Nedunchaalai =

2014 Indian film by N. Krishna

- Theatrical release poster
- Directed by: N. Krishna
- Written by: S. A. Ramakrishnan (Dialogue)
- Screenplay by: N. Krishna
- Story by: N. Krishna
- Produced by: Aaju; C.Soundarajan; Dheeraj Kher
- Starring: Aari Arujunan; Sshivada
- Cinematography: Rajavel Olhiveeran
- Edited by: Kishore Te.
- Music by: C. Sathya
- Production company: Fine Focus
- Distributed by: Red Giant Movies
- Release date: 28 March 2014
- Running time: 149 minutes
- Country: India
- Language: Tamil

Nedunchalai (transl. Highway) is a 2014 Indian Tamil language action drama film written and directed by N. Krishna and produced by Aaju, C. Soundarajan and Dheeraj Kher. The film stars Aari Arujunan and Sshivada in the lead roles, with Thambi Ramiah, Salim Kumar, and Prashant Narayanan in other pivotal roles. The music was composed by C. Sathya with editing by Kishore Te. and cinematography by Rajavel Olhiveeran. The film was released on 28 March 2014.

== Plot ==
An old man hitchhiking on a lorry on the route to Delhi recounts the story of Tharpai Murugan, an infamous dacoit who looted goods off trucks that passed through a desolate stretch of a highway. The old man, Settu, was part of Murugan's group. Murugan was born in an accident that killed both his parents and was taken in by an old man who raised Murugan as his own. Murugan was strong-willed and athletic; however, after his grandfather dies from a faulty moonshine, he joins Guru's group and eventually becomes the leader of the looting. After they sell the goods, they hand them over to Maattu Sekhar and collect their share of commission.

Manga opens a dhaba on the highway. Initially, her business is slow, but after lorries are rerouted to avoid Murugan, her business flourishes. Murugan eats at the dhaba, leaves without paying, and Manga gets him arrested.

The new inspector, Masanamuthu, who lusts after Manga, uses Murugan to threaten her so he can spend time in her dhaba. One day Masana attempts to molest Manga, and she attacks him and warns him to never come by her hotel again. A vengeful Masana arrests her on grounds of prostitution and plants Murugan as the witness. However, Murugan exposes Masana before the judge, revealing that he staged it for personal revenge. Manga owes her life and dignity to Murugan and falls for him.

Masana provides the news of the transport of several goods to Sekhar's gang. They reach the location, with plans for Murugan to join soon once he is sober. A constable leaks Masana's plan to Manga, and she holds him back home. The gang continues without Murugan, with Guru taking his place. However, the "goods" turn out to be toxic chemicals that instantly kill him. Murugan is furious and almost kills Masana, but Sekhar holds him back and tells him that Guru was the one who actually killed his grandfather. A depressed and betrayed Murugan finds solace in Manga, and they start a romance. Manga convinces Murugan to surrender to the collector, hence rendering Masana powerless.

Masana commits several robberies himself, which pressure the SP to start an operation to arrest Murugan. Murugan swears to kill Masana and spend his life in jail, but Manga reveals she is pregnant and convinces him to start a new life away from the town. Masana captures him and plans to loot 4 crores that he was laundering. He hatches a plan to loot with Sekhar's group, pin it on Murugan, and kill him. In a twist, Sekhar kills Masana because he knows that Masana would kill him once his plan is done. He convinces Murugan to loot one last time so they can share the 4 crores among themselves and Murugan and Manga can live a comfortable life. Murugan does so, but Manga begs him not to covet others' money, saying they would never live peacefully. The owner of the money captures them but lets them go after learning they are expecting a child. Things seem rosy for them, but Settu kills Murugan since he robbed him of his chance at the 4 crores.

The story cuts back to the present. Settu arrives in Delhi and looks at Manga from a distance, who is now running a successful restaurant in Murugan's name. Her son is preparing to be an athlete. Settu walks away without speaking to her, saying that she is an example of how to live life, while theirs is an example of how not to.

== Cast ==
- Aari Arujunan as 'Tharpai' Murugan
  - Kishore DS as Young Murugan
- Sshivada as Manga
- Thambi Ramiah as Master
- Salim Kumar as Maattu Sekhar
- Prashant Narayanan as Masanamuthu
- Kannan Ponnaiya as Guru
- Rachana Maurya in a special appearance
- Ashvin Raja as Soozhi
- Kishore Kumar as Settu
- Ken Karunas as Mani, Hotel Assistant
- Thavasi as Thavasi, Murugan's Foster father (Chiyaan)

== Production ==
Nedunchalai is based on the life of a real person. The film's stunt sequences, choreographed by Dhilip Subbarayan, took 25 days to complete, during which he tried experimenting with different sequences.

== Soundtrack ==
The soundtrack album was composed by C. Sathya. It was released on 1 July 2013 at an event where A. R. Rahman, who had collaborated with director Krishna in Sillunu Oru Kaadhal (2006), was invited as chief guest.

Track listing
No.	Title	Lyrics	Singer(s)	Length
1.	"Injathea"	Mani Amudhavan, Vayalar Sharath Chandra Varma (Malayalam)	Roop Kumar Rathod, Madhushree, Yazin Nizar	4:40
2.	"Ivan Yaaro"	Mani Amudhavan	Madhushree	2:15
3.	"Kadal Thaandi"	Mani Amudhavan	Elizabeth Malini, Dheeraj Kher	1:56
4.	"Nandooruthu"	Mani Amudhavan	Palaniammal, Chinna	4:21
5.	"Thamirabharani"	Karthik Netha	C. Sathya	4:56
6.	"Vaigai Nathi"	Mani Amudhavan	C. Sathya, Bavani	3:12
Total length:				21:20

== Critical reception ==
Baradwaj Rangan from The Hindu wrote, "In his previous film, Sillunu Oru Kaadhal, the director Krishna lost his way in trying to balance an intimate story with the overblown must-haves of a star-driven movie. He doesn’t make that mistake in Nedunchalai, which is toplined by Aari Arujunan and a terrific newcomer named Shivada", calling it "a rock-solid B-movie" and "one of the season’s happiest surprises". Sify wrote "The over-the-top characters along with their spontaneous dialogues make Nedunchalai worth a look. Despite its minor flaws, it makes-up with style and excellence". The Times of India gave the film 3 stars out of 5 and wrote, "From the characterization of the hero (right down to his costumes) to the tragic climax, the shadow of Ameer's Paruthiveeran looms large on Nedunchalai, and this is both its strength and weakness" and stated that "this film is certainly a surefooted effort that shows that this director can tell an engaging tale".

== Accolades ==
At the 4th South Indian International Movie Awards, the film received two nominations: Best Debutant Actor – Tamil for Aari, despite this not actually being his debut film, and Best Actor in a Negative Role for Prashanth Narayanan.
