= Veera Chandrahasa =

2025 Indian film by Ravi Basrur

- Theatrical release poster
- Directed by: Ravi Basrur
- Produced by: N. S. Rajkumar
- Starring: Shithil Shetty; Nagashree G. S.; Prasanna Shettigar Mandarti; Uday Kadabaal; Ravindra Devadiga; Nagaraj Servegar; Gunashree M. Nayak; Shridhar Kasarkodu; Shwetha Arehole; Prajwal Kinnal
- Cinematography: Kirankumar R.
- Edited by: Karthik Valagerehalli; Mahesh S Reddy; Ravi Basrur
- Music by: Ravi Basrur
- Production companies: Omkar Movies; Ravi Basrur Movies
- Distributed by: Hombale Films
- Release date: 18 April 2025
- Running time: 154 minutes
- Country: India
- Language: Kannada

Veera Chandrahasa (transl. The Brave Chandrahasa) is a 2025 Indian Kannada-language drama film directed by Ravi Basrur. The film stars Shithil Shetty, Nagashree G. S., Prasanna Shettigar Mandarti, Uday Kadabaal, Ravindra Devadiga, Nagaraj Servegar, Gunashree M. Nayak, Shridhar Kasarkodu, Shwetha Arehole, and Prajwal Kinnal.

== Plot ==
Veera Chandrahasa follows the life of Chandrahasa, an orphan discovered in the forest and raised by Kulinda, a noble of Kuntala. As he grows up, his virtues and noble character earn him respect.

However, Dushtabuddhi, a minister in the kingdom, learns of a prophecy that Chandrahasa could be a threat to the royal family. Fearing this, he makes several attempts to kill him. Each attempt fails, as Chandrahasa survives through his honesty, courage, and divine grace.

In time, Chandrahasa unknowingly returns to the very kingdom that once rejected him, leading to a dramatic clash between fate, loyalty, and power. The film draws heavily from Kannada folklore and the Yakshagana tradition.

== Cast ==
- Shithil Shetty as Chandrahasa
- Nagashree G. S. as Vishaye
- Prasanna Shettigar Mandarti as Dustabudhhi
- Uday Kadabaal as Madana
- Ravindra Devadiga as Brahmana
- Nagaraj Servegar
- Gunashree M. Nayak
- Shridhar Kasarkodu Doota
- Shwetha Arehole
- Prajwal Kinnal
- Shiva Rajkumar as Shiva Puttaswamy (Special appearance)

== Production ==
Prior to commencing the project, Ravi Basrur researched Yakshagana for two to three years. Reportedly, the film was shot using torches and flame lamps rather than set lights. In recording the tracks, Ravi Basrur limited himself to using only two instruments, Maddale and Chende. Thirty-two ragas, from Mohanam to Vasantha, were used to compose the music. Despite undergoing treatment for cancer, Shiva Rajkumar committed to the project and shot for a few days. The film crew used four hundred and fifty Yakshagana performers for the film.

== Soundtrack ==
The soundtrack was composed by Ravi Basrur.

Track listing
No.	Title	Lyrics	Singer(s)	Length
1.	"Veera Rasa" (Title track)	Prasad Mogebettu	Acharya Raghavendra Jhansale	2:44

== Release ==
Veera Chandrahasa was released theatrically on 18 April 2025.

== Reception ==
Bharath Anjanappa of The Hans India rated the film three and three-fourths out of five stars, stating, "A visually rich, sonically mesmerizing, and culturally bold film that challenges the boundaries of Kannada cinema. Veera Chandrahasa may not be for everyone—but for those open to experiencing something wildly different and deeply rooted, it’s a must-watch." Y. Maheswara Reddy of Bangalore Mirror gave the film three out of five stars and wrote, "Background music and Yakshagana add value to the movie. The director’s specialty is his innovative narrative skills. Dr Shivarajkumar’s brief appearance has elevated the movie."

A. Sharadhaa of Cinema Express wrote, "The idea that cinema can be a stage for heritage — this is a rare offering. It’s a celebration of the coastal Karnataka — the kind that demands we not just watch, but listen". S. Viswanath of Deccan Herald gave it two out of five stars and wrote, "Basrur’s ear-drum-splitting epic historical tale of palace intrigue, shot as a traditional Yakshagana dance drama, is torturous at a film theatre."

Vivek M. V. of The Hindu wrote, "Directed by music composer Ravi Basrur, ‘Veera Chandrahasa’ has the novelty of a mythological tale narrated in the form of Yakshagana, but the film required a bigger canvas and cinematic elements". A critic from Udayavani wrote, "Veera Chandrahasa may be an ideal choice for audiences looking to explore a different experience beyond routine commercial cinema."
