= Bhairathi Ranagal =

2024 Kannada film by Narthan

- Theatrical release poster
- Directed by: Narthan
- Written by: Narthan
- Produced by: Geetha Shivrajkumar
- Starring: Shiva Rajkumar; Rahul Bose; Rukmini Vasanth
- Cinematography: I. Naveen Kumar
- Edited by: Akash Hiremath
- Music by: Ravi Basrur
- Production company: Geetha Pictures
- Release date: 15 November 2024
- Running time: 134 minutes
- Country: India
- Language: Kannada
- Budget: ₹18–20 crore
- Box office: ₹30 crore

Bhairathi Ranagal is a 2024 Indian Kannada-language neo-noir action thriller film directed by Narthan and produced by Geetha Shivarajkumar under Geetha Pictures. A prequel to the 2017 film Mufti, it stars Shiva Rajkumar, alongside Rahul Bose, Rukmini Vasanth, Devaraj, Chaya Singh, Madhu Guruswamy, Shabeer Kallarakkal and Babu Hirannaiah. The music was composed by Ravi Basrur, while the cinematography and editing were composed by Naveen Kumar and Akash Hiremath respectively. This was the first prequel of Kannada cinema.

Bhairathi Ranagal was released on 15 November 2024 and received positive reviews from critics. The film was reported to be profitable at the box office.

== Premise ==
The story revolves around Bhairathi Ranagal's journey from being a law-abiding responsible lawyer to the kind-hearted crime boss of Karnataka, after a greedy industrialist named Parande became a threat to his hometown.

== Cast ==
- Shiva Rajkumar as Bhairathi Ranagal
- Rahul Bose as Parande
- Rukmini Vasanth as Dr. Vaishali
- Avinash as Khandre
- Devaraj as Raghuveer Bhandari
- Chaya Singh as Vedhavathi, Ranagal's younger sister
- Shabeer Kallarakkal as Ghatta
- Gopalkrishna Deshpande
- Madhu Guruswamy as Singa, Ranagal's henchman
- Anekal chandru
- Babu Hirannaiah as Shabari, Ranagal's henchman
- Sriimurali as Gana (archive footage from Mufti)

== Production ==
=== Development ===
After making a debut as director with Mufti, Narthan had written a script for Yash, who he was rumored to collaborate with. However, after being forced to rework on the script and delay in confirmations, Narthan approached Ram Charan who was also keen on collaborating with UV Creations. The talks were going on for over a year and later Narthan, who had already worked on Bhairathi Ranagal – a character from Mufti, decided to join hands once again with Shiva Rajkumar. Shiva Rajkumar, who had also been listening to various scripts, finally zeroed in on Bhairathi Ranagal.

However, in late 2023, there were once again rumors that the script which was narrated to Ram Charan had been moved to Vijay Deverakonda. The production of the film started in May 2023.

=== Casting ===
Shiva Rajkumar, Chaya Singh, Vasishta N. Simha, Devaraj, Madhu Guruswamy and other remaining actors from the first part reprised their respective roles. The team was actively looking for a female lead and antagonist for the film. Rukmini Vasanth was roped in play the female lead in the film which was announced in June 2023. Narthan in one of his interviews said that we were looking for a perfect antagonist to match Shivarajkumar's swag and we could not think of anyone but Rahul Bose. Rahul Bose was chose to play the antagonist, the movie also marked his comeback to Kannada cinema after Niruttara. Tamil actor Shabeer Kallarakkal famously knows for his role of Dancing rose in Sarpatta Parambarai was also brought on board to play one of the important roles.

=== Filming ===
The film went on floors on 26 May 2023. The shooting commenced on 2 August 2023 and took place in different schedules in various locations including Devanahalli, Mysore, Bellary and Penugonda. Shivarajkumar who was promoting his film Ghost during October 2023 had shared that around 60 days of shoot was left. Around the same time, Shivarajkumar's looks from the shooting sets were leaked in a new avatar which further increased the curiosity among the fans and the audience. On the date of announcement of the release date, the team had said that they have completed around 70% of the shooting and would wrap the rest in the following days in a swift manner, after which the post production is set to commence. The filming was wrapped by July 2024.

== Soundtrack ==
Bhairathi Ranagal

Soundtrack album by Ravi Basrur
- Released: 2024
- Genre: Feature film soundtrack
- Length: 3:51
- Language: Kannada
- Label: Anand Audio
- Producer: Ravi Basrur

Ravi Basrur chronology
Bhimaa (2024)	Bhairathi Ranagal (2024)	Zebra (2024)

Ravi Basrur who had previously worked with Narthan on Mufti, composed the soundtrack and score of the film. The audio rights of the film were acquired by Anand Audio.

No.	Title	Lyrics	Singer(s)	Length
1.	"Bhairathi Ranagal Title Song"	Kinnal Raj	Santhosh Venky	03:51
2.	"Agnyaathavaasa"	V. Nagendra Prasad	Shankar Mahadevan	04:02
3.	"Kaavaliga"	Sai Sarvesh	Vijay Prakash	04:59

== Release ==
=== Theatrical ===
The film is scheduled to release on 15 November 2024 in multiple languages including Kannada, Hindi, Tamil, Telugu and Malayalam. Earlier it was announced to release on 15 August 2024 but later it was postponed.

=== Home media ===
The film began streaming on Amazon Prime Video from 25 December 2024. Dubbed versions are in Sun NXT.

== Reception ==
=== Critical response ===
Sanjay Ponnappa of India Today gave 4/5 stars and wrote "Bhairathi Ranagal delivers an impactful telling of the character's backstory, leaving the audience wanting more." A. Sharadhaa of The New Indian Express gave 3/5 stars and wrote "Bhairathi Ranagal blends action, drama and intensity, but misses the mark in some key areas. While Shivarajkumar's performance is fully utilised, the film lacks the impactful twists seen in Mufti, making the plot feel predictable" but praised Shivarajkumar's performance as a masterclass in conveying depth and complexity. Subha J Rao of The News Minute gave a 3.5 rating out of 5 and praised the movie which is set against iron mining for "crafting its own path and cleverly bypassing any comparison to a recent blockbuster franchise that revolved around gold mining". Vijay Lokesh of The Times of India gave 3/5 stars and wrote "Bhairathi Ranagal is sure to captivate Shivarajkumar fans and will appeal to those who enjoy crime dramas with an emotional core." Jagadish Angadi of Deccan Herald gave 3/5 stars and wrote "Bhairathi Ranagal still delivers an entertaining experience, particularly for Shivarajkumar fans and action thriller enthusiasts."

Shashiprasad SM of Times Now gave 3/5 stars and wrote "For those curious about the backstory of Bhairathi Ranagal and eager to see Shivanna in peak action, this is a must-watch. For the rest it is the ‘usual’ theme of a good samaritan turning bad for good." Pratibha Joy of OTTplay gave 2.5/5 stars and wrote "Director Narthan's prequel is strictly for those who loved Mufti's Bhairathi Ranagal and want more of that. It's not a compelling watch!"

Vivek MV of The Hindu wrote "Bhairathi Ranagal is elevated by the commanding screen presence of Shivarajkumar, who revels in mass moments to power a straightforward gangster origin story." Avinash Ramachandran of The Indian Express wrote, "With so much care going into the elevation of the titular character played by Shivarajkumar, it is slightly disappointing that Narthan rushes through the last act."

=== Box office ===
The film was reported to have grossed ₹2–5 crore on its first day, but the tracked figure was only ₹2.1 crore. The film earned ₹2.3 crore on second day and ₹2.85 crore on its third day respectively. The first weekend collection was around ₹7–8.4 crore. The ₹10 crore mark was achieved within 4 days. The film was reported to have earned ₹12.8 crore gross and ₹13 crore net in its first week. The film was reported to have grossed ₹17 crore within first fourteen days of its release. The film's collection in seventeen days was reported to be ₹20 crore gross to ₹20.94 net. The film collected ₹24 crore until the release of other big Kannada movies in December. The final collections were reported to be around ₹26.80 crores to ₹30 crores.
