= Just Maduveli =

- Directed by: Kolara Seena
- Screenplay by: Kolara Seena
- Starring: Harish Jalagere; Deepa
- Cinematography: Cinetech Soori
- Music by: Ravi Basrur
- Release date: 3 April 2015 (Karnataka)
- Country: India
- Language: Kannada

Just Maduveli: A journey of love is a 2015 Kannada-language film directed by Kolar Seena and produced by Universal Hatrick Combines. The film stars Harish Jalagere and Deepa.

== Plot ==
Santosh (played by Harish Jalagere) is a wedding videographer who arrives to shoot a wedding and immediately falls in love with a girl he finds so attractive, Nandini, only to later know that she none other than the bride-to-be. Santosh befriends her only to realize that she does not want this wedding for she loves another man Rahul.

Santosh’s aim is now to take Nandini to Rahul. They escape from the wedding, and everybody starts believing that the two love each other. On the other hand, Nandini’s to-be-husband and his gang chase them ceaselessly. In the end, Rahul appears and Santosh, after handing her over to him returns home. The film does not have a happy ending.

== Cast ==
- Harish Jalagere as Santosh
- Deepa Gowda as Nandini
- Lokesh as Rudra
- Bullet Prakash as Rahul
- Bank Janardhan

== Soundtrack ==
External audio
- Official Audio Jukebox on YouTube

Ravi Basrur composed the soundtrack.

No.	Title	Lyrics	Singer(s)	Length
1.	"Baby Doll Pappu"	Santhosh Venky, Lakshmi	Chandan Shetty	4:02
2.	"Nin Kannal"	Ravi Basrur	Sai Charan	3:50
3.	"Ennamme Mellane"	Jayanth Kaikini	Santhosh Venky	4:07
4.	"Madhuve Maneya"	Hemanth Das, V. Nagendra Prasad	Santhosh Venky, Anuradha Bhat	3:34
5.	"Darling Coming"	Hemanth Das	Santosh Venky, Lakshmi	3:37
6.	"Baby Doll"	Rahul, Kenny	Kenny	3:23

== Reception ==
A critic from The Times of India wrote that "It’s a case of a good storyline being marred by poor direction, dialogues and narration".
