= Madhu Guruswamy =

Indian actor

- Born: 3 May 1986 (age 39); Mysore, Karnataka, India
- Occupation: Actor
- Years active: 2010 – present

Madhu Guruswamy is an Indian actor who predominantly works in Kannada cinema in addition to a few Telugu and Tamil films.

== Early life and career ==
After taking acting lessons at Abhinaya Tharanga, Guruswamy spent a few years in theater. He was very fond of theater work and did several stage shows, while starting his career as a theater actor.

Guruswamy's first movie was Deadly-2 (2010), in which he also worked as an assistant director. His role in Bhajarangi (2013) brought him into the limelight, and his movies thereafter made his position stronger in the film industry, moreso after the blockbuster film Mufti (2017).

Guruswamy made his Telugu debut with Saakshyam (2018) and his Tamil debut with Pathu Thala (2023). The latter was a remake of Mufti, and Guruswamy reprised his role. His next Telugu film was the Prabhas-starrer Salaar (2023), in which he played the antagonist. He then teamed up with Mufti director Narthan for Bhairathi Ranagal, the sequel of Mufti.

== Filmography ==
- All films in Kannada, unless otherwise noted

Key
†	Denotes films that have not yet been released

Year	Film	Role	Notes	Ref.
2010	Deadly-2	Kencha	Also assistant director	
2012	Chingari	Vinesh Malhotra		
2012	Jaanu	Sangamesh		
2013	Bhajarangi	Manthravadhi		
2015	Vajrakaya	Hujoor		
2016	Jai Maruti 800	Veerappa		
2017	Mufti	Singa		
2018	Saakshyam	Guruswami	Telugu film	
2023	Pathu Thala	Singa	Tamil film	
2023	Salaar: Part 1 – Ceasefire	Hazare	Telugu film	
2024	Bhairathi Ranagal	Singa		

== Awards and nominations ==
Year	Award	Category	Film	Result	Ref
2014	IIFA Festival Awards	Best Actor in a Negative Role	Vajrakaya	Nominated	
