= Gargar Mandala =

Gargar Mandla
- Directed by: Ravi Basrur
- Written by: Ravi Basrur; Panak Makkal Team
- Screenplay by: Ravi Basrur
- Story by: Panak Makkal Team
- Produced by: Inkfinet Pictures
- Starring: Adarsh; Shemith; Omguru; Vijay Basrur
- Cinematography: Bhuvan Gowda
- Edited by: Harish
- Music by: Ravi Basrur
- Production company: Green Studio
- Distributed by: Inkfinet Pictures
- Release date: 12 September 2014
- Country: India
- Language: Kannada
- Budget: ₹4.7 million (US$49,000)

Gargar Mandala (Kannada: ಗರ್ ಗರ್ ಮಂಡ್ಲ) is a 2014 Indian Kundapura Kannada film directed by Ravi Basrur and produced under the banner Inkfinite Pictures. It stars Adarsh and Shemith as the lead pair, supported by Omguru and Vijay Basrur and others.

The film was marketed as the first commercial film in Kundapura Kannada.

== Cast ==
- Adarsh as Surya
- Shemith as Anitha
- Omguru as Guru
- Vijay Basrur as Ravishankar
- Uday Basrur as Murulinath
- Satish Basrur as Satish
- Raghu Pandeshwar as Pandu
- Raghavendra as Udaya
- Manju as Manju
- Chandrashekar as Chandra
- Sowmya as Sharada

== Soundtrack ==
The music of the film is composed by Ravi Basrur with lyrics written by Ashok Neelavara, Sachin, & Panak Makkal team. The soundtrack has eight songs in total. Srimurali released the movie's audio CDs in Bangalore.

=== Track List ===
No.	Title	Lyrics	Singer(s)	Length
1.	"Yentha Chandha Namm Bhashi"	Ravi Basrur	Ravi Basrur	1:51
2.	"Kathli Kattadh Aata Kani"	Ravi Basrur	Ravi Basrur	3:14
3.	"Yeagalinda Nan Kanthidha"	Ravi Basrur and Team	Priya Yadhav	4:49
4.	"Payatig Hooi Meen Takabani"	Ravi Basrur, Sachin Basrur	Ravi Basrur, Priya Yadhav	4:00
5.	"Undadi Gunda"	Yogaraj Bhat	Ravi Basrur	3:48
6.	"Hyangu Halaith Naav"	Team	Ravi Basrur	3:55
7.	"Mobile Kaig Sikki"	Ravi Basrur and Team	Prashanth	3:09
8.	"Gar Gar Mandla"	Ravi Basrur, Sachin Basrur	Ravi Basrur	4:27
