= Kannadiga (film) =

2021 Indian Kannada period drama film

- Directed by: B.M.Giriraj
- Written by: B.M.Giriraj
- Story by: B.M.Giriraj
- Produced by: N.S.Rajkumar
- Starring: V. Ravichandran; Paavana Gowda
- Cinematography: G.S.V.Seetharam
- Edited by: Arjun Kittu
- Music by: Ravi Basrur
- Production company: Omkaar Movies
- Distributed by: ZEE5
- Release date: 17 November 2021
- Running time: 143 minutes
- Country: India
- Language: Kannada

Kannadiga (transl. A Kannada Person) is a 2021 Indian Kannada-language period drama film written and directed by B.M. Giriraj. The film is produced by N.S.Rajkumar under the banner Omkaar Movies. It features V. Ravichandran and Paavana Gowda in the lead roles. The supporting cast includes Achyuth Kumar and Jeevika. The score and soundtrack for the film is by Ravi Basrur and the cinematography is by G.S.V.Seetharram. The film owing to the COVID -19 pandemic was released directly on ZEE5.

== Cast ==
- V. Ravichandran as Gunabhadra
- Paavana Gowda as Gunabhadra's wife
- Jeevika as Hena
- Balaji Manohar
- Jagadish Mythri
- Achyuth Kumar as Harigopala
- Chi. Guru Dutt
- Jamie Alter as Reverend Ferdinand Kittel
- Rachanaa G N as Tunga

== Production ==
The filming of the film began in later mid-2020 and had wrapped by early 2021. The film had Ravichandran as a lead and Pavana Gowda as the female lead on board. The film also had Balaji Manohar playing the pivotal character in film.

== Soundtrack ==
Kannadiga

Soundtrack album by Ravi Basrur
- Released: 2021
- Genre: Feature film soundtrack
- Length: 2:34
- Language: Kannada
- Label: Anand Audio
- Producer: N. S. Rajkumar

Ravi Basrur chronology
Girmit (2019)	Kannadiga (2021)	100 (2021)

The film's background score and the soundtracks are composed by Ravi Basrur. The music rights were acquired by Anand Audio.

Tracklist
No.	Title	Lyrics	Singer(s)	Length
1.	"Kannadiga Title Track"	Santhosh Ananddram	Shiva Rajkumar	2:34
Total length:				2:34

== Release ==
The film was slated to release in the theaters initially in April 2021 but later owing to the COVID-19 pandemic it skipped the theatrical release and was released directly on the streaming platform ZEE5 on 17 December 2021.

== Reception ==
The film received a mixed response from both critics and the audience and failed to impress the audience.

The Times of India gave 3/5 and stated "Kannadiga is a film that is pertinent and worth a watch for those who like this genre. The length could get the better of you, but it is an earnest film if you persist."

The New Indian Express gave 3/5 and stated "If the Kannada language is thriving even today, it is all because of the sacrifices made by the scriptwriters in the past, who have managed to preserve the Kannada work, and culture for generations now. And Kannadiga is important documentation that showcases the love of our mother tongue."
