= Obeli N. Krishna =

Indian film director

- Born: Krishnan K. T. Nagarajan; Komarapalayam, Tamil Nadu; India
- Occupations: Film director, screenwriter
- Years active: 2006–present
- Spouse: Poornima
- Children: 2

Obeli N. Krishna (commonly known as Krishna) is an Indian film director and screenwriter, from the Tamil film industry. He made his directorial debut with the 2006 romantic drama, Sillunu Oru Kaadhal, with Suriya and Jyothika.

== Career ==
Krishna started his film career in Tamil film industry, with Gautham Vasudev Menon. He was the associate director in Minnale and its Hindi remake, Rehnaa Hai Terre Dil Mein. He was also the co-director for Kaakha Kaakha and it's Telugu remake, Gharshana.

Krishna made his directorial debut with the romantic film Sillunu Oru Kaadhal. It starred Suriya and Jyothika in pivotal roles, while Bhumika, Shriya Sharma, Sukanya, Vadivelu and Santhanam played other pivotal roles. The film's score and soundtrack were composed by A. R. Rahman, with lyrics by the Indian poet, Vaali. The cinematography for the film was handled by R. D. Rajasekhar, while the editing was handled by Gautham Menon's regular, Anthony. The film was released on 8 September 2006.

Krishna's second film, Yen Ippadi Mayakkinai starring Richard Rishi and Gayathrie was completed but never hit the screens due to the production company, Pyramid Saimira, filing for bankruptcy. Music was scored by the debutant music director C. Sathya.

Krishna returned to direction, in 2012, with the realistic film, Nedunchaalai, a period drama set in the 1980s. The film was announced in February 2012. It starred Aari with Sshivada in lead roles. Prashant Narayanan was signed on to play a pivotal role in the film, as was supporting actor Thambi Ramiah. The film's score and soundtrack were composed by C. Sathya. The cinematography for the film was handled by Rajavel Olhiveeran, while it was edited by the late-Kishore Te. Udhayanidhi Stalin's Red Giant Movies, acquired the distribution rights for the film, after being impressed in a private screening, in December 2013. After a long delay, the film released on 28 March 2014. It opened to generally positive reviews, by the critics and audience alike. It ended up as a critical and commercial success. Krishna's next directorial was Maane Thaene Paeye. However, it was shelved for unknown reasons.

Pathu Thala directed by Krishna, standing as a landmark film in Tamil cinema, is the official adaptation of Mufti. It stars Silambarasan, Gautham Karthick, and Priya Bhavani Shankar in lead roles. The music was composed by A. R. Rahman, in his second collaboration with Krishna, after Sillunu Oru Kaadhal. The film grossed Rs 55 crores.

Director Obeli N Krishna is currently working on a new project rumoured to be titled Sillunu Oru Kaadhal 2, a sequel to Sillunu Oru Kaadhal, under the banner of Prince Pictures. Details about the cast and crew for this upcoming film haven't been revealed yet.

== Filmography ==
=== As a director ===
Year	Title	Notes
2006	Sillunu Oru Kaadhal	Debut as director
2014	Nedunchaalai	
2019	Hippi	Telugu film
2023	Pathu Thala	Remake of Mufti

=== As an actor ===
Year	Title	Role
2000	Manasu	College Student
2001	Minnale	Lorry driver
2014	Nedunchaalai	Lorry driver
2023	Pathu Thala	Chief Minister Vaazhai Karunakaran
