= Girmit =

2019 Kannada-language film

- Directed by: Ravi Basrur
- Written by: Ravi Basrur
- Screenplay by: Suchan Shetty; Pramod Maravante; Kinnal Raj; Sandeep Sirsi; B Manjunath
- Story by: Ravi Basrur
- Produced by: N. S. Rajkumar
- Starring: Ashlesh Raj; Shlagha Saligrama; Jayendra Vakwadi; Aradhya shetty; Tanisha Koni; Nagaraj Japti; Pavithra Heskattur; Shravya Maravante; Aditya Kundapura; Sinchana Koteshwara
- Cinematography: Sachin Basrur
- Edited by: Ravi Basrur
- Music by: Ravi Basrur
- Production companies: Omkar Movies; Ravi Basrur Movies
- Distributed by: KRG Studio
- Release date: 8 November 2019
- Running time: 120 minutes
- Language: Kannada

Girmit is a 2019 Indian Kannada-language film written and directed by Ravi Basrur. The film is also being dubbed into English with the same title, into Tamil and Malayalam as Podi Mass, and into Hindi and Telugu as Pakka Mass starring Ashlesh Raj and Shlagha Saligrama in the lead roles. The music was composed by Ravi Basrur, and the film was produced by N. S. Rajkumar Omkar Movies and Ravi Basrur Movies.

== Cast ==
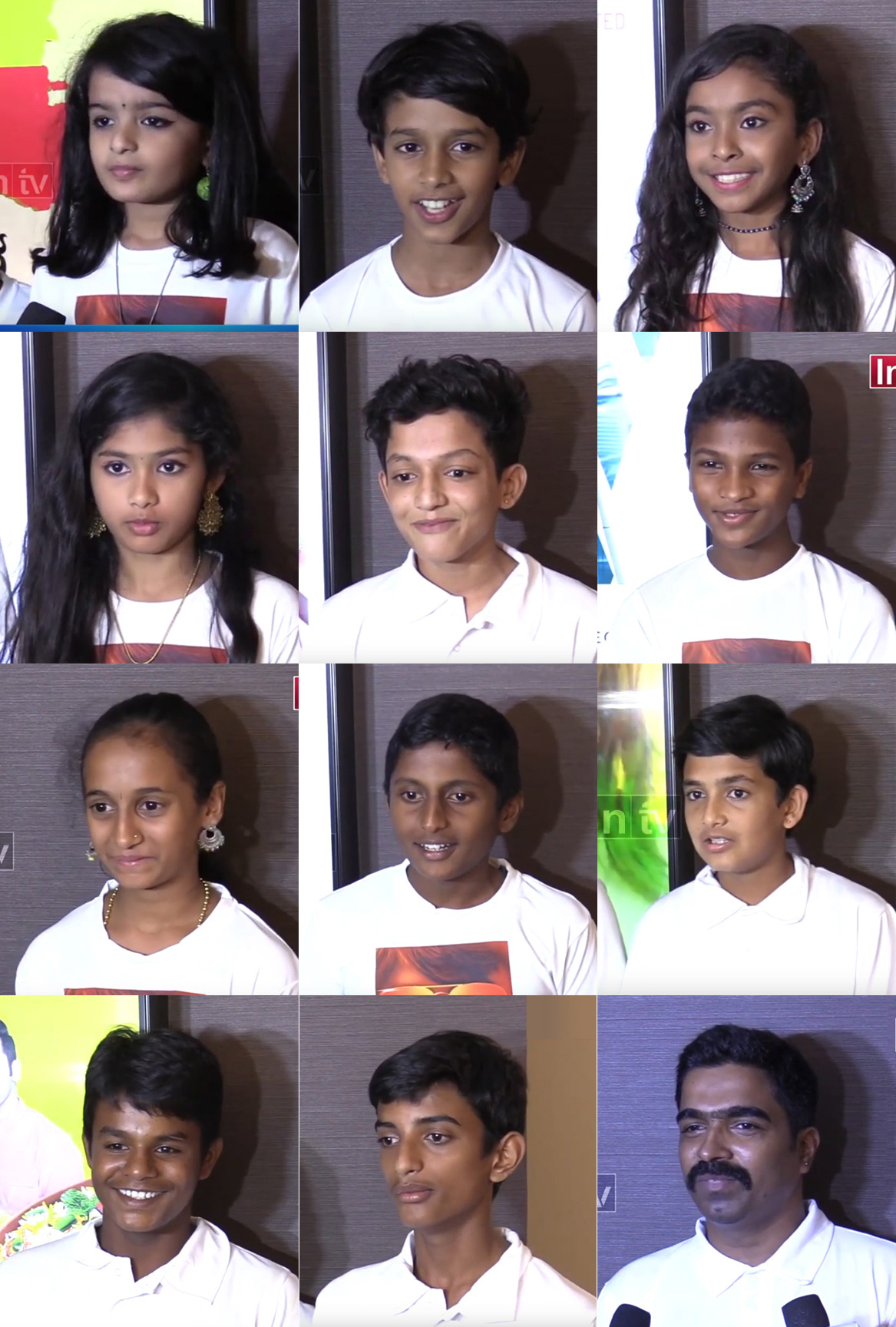
Cast of the film, from left to right (top to bottom): Shlagha Saligrama, Ashlesh Raj, Shravya Maravante, Tanisha Koni, Jayendra Vakwadi, Abhishek Karkada, Sahana Balekere, Manish Shetty, Aditya Kundapura, Nagaraj Japti, Dhanush Gundmi, film director Ravi Basrur

- Ashlesh Raj as Raj
- Shlagha Saligrama as Rashmi
- Jayendra Vakwadi as Sadhashiva
- Nagaraj Japti as Shankarappa
- Pavithra Heskattur as Saroja
- Aditya Kundapura as Damodara
- Sahana Basrur as Jalajakshi
- Tanisha Koni as Rekha
- Aradhya shetty as Roopa
- Dhanush Gundmi as Sudhakara
- Shravya Maravante as Sushila
- Sinchana Koteshwara as Sindhu
- Ullas as Pandya
- Manish Shetty as Bhaskara
- Sarthak shenoy as Maadha

== Production ==
The film is touted to be a family-drama-action-comedy and has about 280 child artistes playing different roles. The child artistes will have a strong resemblance to the stars who do the voiceovers for their characters. Top actors in Sandalwood have done the voiceovers for this film; the list includes Yash, Radhika Pandit, Sudha Belawadi, Rangayana Raghu, Achyuth Kumar, Tara, Puneeth Rudranag, Petrol Prasanna, and Sadhu Kokila.

== Soundtrack ==
Puneeth Rajkumar has also sung for this film.

Kannada tracklist (Girmit)

No.	Title	Lyrics	Singer(s)	Length
1.	"Arambhave Anandave"	Kinnal Raj	Santhosh Venky	3:31
2.	"Dhoom Ratta"	Ravi Basrur	Puneeth Rajkumar	3:20
3.	"Tik Tok"	Pramod Maravanthe	Naveen Sajju, Arundhati Hegde	4:10

Telugu tracklist (Pakka Mass)

No.	Title	Lyrics	Singer(s)	Length
1.	"Singarala Seeta Devi"	Ramajogayya Sastry	Santhosh Venky	3:31
2.	"Dhoom Racha"	Ramajogayya Sastry	Santosh Venky	3:20
3.	"Tik Tok"	Ramajogayya Sastry	Santosh Venky, Arundhati Hegde	4:10

Hindi tracklist (Pakka Mass)

No.	Title	Lyrics	Singer(s)	Length
1.	"Pehali Nazar"	Priya Saraiya	Santhosh Venky	3:31
2.	"Dhoom Ratta"	Deepak Bharati	Santhosh Venky	3:20
3.	"Tik Tok"	Deepak Bharati	Santhosh Venky, Ananya Bhat	4:10

Tamil tracklist (Podi Mass)

No.	Title	Lyrics	Singer(s)	Length
1.	"Jimmy Jimmy"	Madhura Kavi	Santhosh Venky	3:31
2.	"Dhoom Ratta"	Madhura Kavi	Santhosh Venky	3:20
3.	"Tik Tok"	Madhura Kavi	Gana Bala, Arundhati Hegde	4:10

Malayalam tracklist (Podi Mass)

No.	Title	Lyrics	Singer(s)	Length
1.	"Neeharamo Neeralamo"	Sudamsu	Mohan Krishna	3:31
2.	"Dhoom Ratta"	Sudamsu	Mohan Krishna	3:20
3.	"Tik Tok"	Sudamsu	Mohan Krishna, Neethu	4:10

English tracklist (Girmit)

No.	Title	Lyrics	Singer(s)	Length
1.	"My Happiness"	Gubbi	Emiliano Laino	3:31
2.	"Dhoom Ratta"	Gubbi	Santosh Venky	3:20
3.	"Tik Tok"	Gubbi	Santosh Venky, Ananya Bhat	4:10
