= Mufti (film) =

2017 Indian Kannada-language action film

- Film Poster
- Directed by: Narthan
- Written by: Narthan; K. Ram Sri Lakshman
- Produced by: Jayanna; Bhogendra
- Starring: Shiva Rajkumar; Sriimurali; Shanvi Srivastava
- Cinematography: I. Naveen Kumar
- Edited by: Harish Komme
- Music by: Ravi Basrur
- Production company: Jayanna Combines
- Distributed by: Jayanna Films
- Release date: 1 December 2017
- Running time: 160 minutes
- Country: India
- Language: Kannada
- Budget: ₹20 crores
- Box office: ₹50 crores

Mufti (transl. Undercover) is a 2017 Indian Kannada-language neo-noir action spy thriller film directed by Narthan, making his debut, and produced by Jayanna Combines. The film stars Shiva Rajkumar, Sriimurali, and Shanvi Srivastava in the lead roles, while Devaraj, Chaya Singh, Madhu Guruswamy, Vasishta N. Simha, and Babu Hirannaiah play supporting roles. The film tells the story of an undercover cop (Sriimurali) who tracks down and confronts a crime boss (Shiva Rajkumar).

Production started in July 2016, and the film was released on 1 December 2017. The film received positive reviews from critics. The film was declared blockbuster at the box office and was one of the highest-grossing movies in Shivarajkumar's career.

The film was remade in Tamil in 2023 as Pathu Thala. starring Silambarasan and Gautham Karthik. The film's prequel titled Bhairati Ranagal was released in 2024.

== Plot ==
Gana, an undercover cop posing as an assassin, spends two years working for a crime syndicate in Mangalore before being assigned to Ronapura to infiltrate the organisation of Bhairathi Ranagal, a former lawyer and crime boss who rules the village. Acting on the commissioner's orders, Gana conceals his identity. Upon arriving, he is welcomed by Vishnu and meets Kashi, the head of Ranagal's cement company.

Gurukanth Bhandri is selected as the Chief Ministerial Candidate in Karnataka and targets Ronapura in the upcoming elections. However, the party's MP, Ekanath Nimbalkar, dies in an apparent accident orchestrated by Ranagal. Gurukanth's brother, Raghuveer Bhandri, approaches social worker and environmentalist Ashwath Kudari to become the party's candidate, but Kudari initially refuses. Meanwhile, Gana earns the trust of Ranagal's left-hand man, Singa and right-hand man Shabari by helping them recover a consignment of black money from a goods train. He subsequently assists them with their operations, arousing Kashi's jealousy.

Kudari organises a rally against Ranagal's environmentally damaging mining operations. In retaliation, Ranagal instigates a riot and burns the homes of villagers supporting the rally, prompting Kudari to join Raghuveer's election campaign. Kashi later brings a police officer who leaked information about the unaccounted money on the goods train to Gana and orders him to shoot the officer. Although the officer had helped Gana with his undercover operation, he is unaware of Gana's identity. Gana reluctantly kills him, leaving him consumed with guilt and determined to arrest Ranagal.

At the mining site, Ranagal apprehends those responsible for Nimbalkar's death, revealing that he did not kill the MP. Gana subsequently saves Ranagal from an attack at a temple, orchestrated by Pashupathi, an aspiring MP candidate. Ranagal retaliates and warns Pashupathi against further interference. Later, Ranagal invites Gana to dinner, where he meets Ranagal's sister, Vedhavathi, and her daughter, Avani.

While Ranagal is out walking, Gana secretly enters his house and discovers bank account numbers recorded in a copy of Sri Ramayana Darshanam. He escapes shortly before Ranagal returns and reports to his hideout, where Kashi has deduced his identity. Kashi calls Singa in Gana's presence to expose him, but Singa instead phones Gana and orders him to kill Kashi. Gana reveals that he fabricated evidence, implicating Kashi in a plot with Pashupathi to assassinate Ranagal, then kills him. Investigating the accounts, Gana discovers that the money was transferred to orphanages, old-age homes and Public schools. He also learns that Ranagal has built houses to improve the villagers' lives, explaining their devotion to him.

When Ranagal is accused of attacking Kudari, he identifies the culprit as his own driver. After the driver is killed, Ranagal offers Kudari plants and flowers as compensation and encourages him to contest the election independently. It is subsequently revealed that Raghuveer masterminded the attacks. As Ranagal and Gana travel to the election office, their car explodes. Raghuveer has bribed Shabari to kill Ranagal in exchange for an election nomination in the Ronapura constituency. However, Ranagal and Gana survive. At the office, Gana exposes Shabari by returning his watch, having noticed that Ranagal was wearing it and recognised the trap. Ranagal kills Shabari and hangs his body from a lamp post near Raghuveer's house as a warning.

Vedhavathi condemns Ranagal for killing her husband but later overhears Gana and Singa discussing the man's involvement in a medical scam that killed hundreds of villagers. She realises that Ranagal killed him to avenge the victims. On Ranagal's birthday, Gana reconciles her with Ranagal. Ranagal expresses his indebtedness to Gana and reveals his troubled past and resentment towards the Government. Following the commissioner's instructions, Gana leaves Ronapura with the evidence.

On his way to the commissioner's office, Gana is struck by Raghuveer's car but survives. Meanwhile, Ranagal visits his father's grave alone, where Raghuveer arrives with his henchmen to kill him. Gana reaches the scene and joins Ranagal in fighting the attackers. Together, they defeat the henchmen and Ranagal kills Raghuveer by slashing his throat.

Recognising Gana's integrity, Ranagal surrenders to the police. Gana is appointed SP and reports to his new office, where he finds the copy of Sri Ramayana Darshanam, in which he discovers his portrait in a police uniform. Reading it, he realises that Ranagal had known his true identity all along. In prison, Ranagal is also reading a copy of the book.

== Cast ==
- Shiva Rajkumar as Bhairathi Ranagal
- Sriimurali as Gana, CBI officer in disguise (Mufti)
- Shanvi Srivastava as Raksha, Gana's love interest
- Devaraj as Raghuveer Bhandari, a politician
- Chaya Singh as Vedhavathi, Ranagal's younger sister
- Nyla Pramod as Avani, Vedhavathi's daughter
- Madhu Guruswamy as Singa, Ranagal's henchman
- Babu Hirannaiah as Shabari Ramanathan, Ranagal's henchman
- Vasishta N. Simha as Kashi, Ranagal's henchman
- Sadhu Kokila as Ad Hero
- Chikkanna as James Jackson, a director
- Prakash Belawadi as Ashwath Kudari, a social worker and environmentalist
- Bala Rajwadi as Pashupathi
- Raj Surya as Ronnie
- Vinay Krishnaswamy as Ranagal's Lawyer
- K. S. Sridhar
- Ashok Hegde
- Manjunath Hegde
- Shekhar Rao
- Bus Kumar

== Soundtrack ==
Mufti

Soundtrack album by Ravi Basrur
- Released: November 2017
- Genre: Feature film soundtrack
- Length: 8:10
- Language: Kannada
- Label: JBC Audio
- Producer: Ravi Basrur

Ravi Basrur chronology
Kataka (2017)	Mufti (2017)	Mantram (2017)

Ravi Basrur composed two original tracks for the film and scored its background music. He previously worked with Sriimurali on Ugramm and Rathavara.

Original tracklist

No.	Title	Lyrics	Singer(s)	Length
1.	"Chanooranu"	Sai Sarvesh	Ravi Basrur	03:15
2.	"Onti Salaga"	Narthan M	Vyasraj Sosale, Mohan, Srinivas, Ravi Basrur	04:30

== Reception ==
Sunayana Suresh of The Times of India gave 3.5 out of 5 and wrote "This is definitely one of the more interesting narratives that have been told on Sandalwood screen this year and it is worth that visit to the halls if intriguing and innovative commercial dramas are what you like." A Sharadhaa of The New Indian Express wrote "Mufti looks promising and will be another film in Sriimurali’s hit list, and Shivarajkumar’s role will stay in the minds of moviegoers."

Karthik Keramalu of Firstpost wrote "Mufti is a multi-starrer that’s designed to cater to fans of both Shiva Rajkumar and Sriimurali."

== Accolades ==
Award	Category	Recipient	Result	Ref
2017 Karnataka State Film Awards	Best Editing	Harish Komme	Won	
65th Filmfare Awards South	Best Actor	Shiva Rajkumar	Nominated	
7th South Indian International Movie Awards	Best Actor- Kannada	Shiva Rajkumar	Nominated	
7th South Indian International Movie Awards	Best Actor- Kannada	Sri Murali	Nominated	
7th South Indian International Movie Awards	Critics' Best Actor	Sri Murali	Won	

== Sequel ==
After the success of the film, the makers decided to explore the back story of the character played by Shivarajkumar and hence the idea got into play when the movie was announced 26 May 2023. The movie is titled Bhairathi Ranagal, which is said to be both a prequel and sequel to the film.

== Remake ==
The film was remade in Tamil as Pathu Thala by Studio Green, starring Silambarasan and Gautham Karthik. It was directed by Obeli N. Krishna and released in March 2023.
