= Sillunu Oru Kaadhal =

2006 Indian film by Obeli N. Krishna

- Film poster
- Directed by: Krishna
- Written by: Sab John
- Produced by: K. E. Gnanavel Raja
- Starring: Suriya; Jyothika; Bhoomika
- Cinematography: R. D. Rajasekhar
- Edited by: Anthony
- Music by: A. R. Rahman
- Distributed by: Studio Green
- Release date: 8 September 2006
- Running time: 175 minutes
- Country: India
- Language: Tamil

Sillunu Oru Kaadhal (transl. A Breezy Love) is a 2006 Indian Tamil-language romantic drama film directed by Krishna (in his directoral debut) and produced by K. E. Gnanavel Raja. It stars Suriya, Jyothika, and Bhoomika, while Shriya Sharma, Sukanya, Vadivelu and Santhanam play supporting roles. The film's score and soundtrack were composed by A. R. Rahman, with lyrics by Vaali; cinematography for the film was handled by R. D. Rajasekhar and editing was handled by Anthony. The film was released on 8 September 2006, three days before the wedding of Suriya and Jyothika. In 2015, it was remade into Marathi as Tu Hi Re.

== Plot ==
Kundavi was brought up in a small town called Ambasamudram in Tirunelveli district. She, along with her two friends, decide to have a love marriage. However she is not so successful. Her father arranges her marriage to Gowtham against her wishes. Both look gloomy during the wedding due to obvious reasons.

Six years later in Mumbai they have a five-year-old daughter Ishwarya and live happily in love as a married couple. Gowtham works as the chief mechanical engineer at Maruti Suzuki and Kundavi works at a local call centre. Gowtham goes to New York City for a short period. During this time, Kundavi comes across Gowtham's old college diary. Gowtham wanted to be an engineer from a young age and forced his father's brother to pay for a seat in Coimbatore for mechanical engineering. From the second year of college, he reached a position of good power in social standing and was feared. In college, he is attracted to Ishwarya, whose father is a Member of Parliament from Coimbatore. Gowtham and Ishwarya fall in love and decide to get married. At the registrar's office after Gowtham ties the knot, Ishwarya's father and his men beat him up, separating the lovers and sending Ishwarya off to Sydney, Australia. At the end of the diary, Gowtham writes a note: "If I have one wish, it would be to live with Ishwarya happily at least for one day." Then, due to his uncle's last wish at death bed, Gowtham agrees to marry Kundavi.

Gowtham returns from New York and finds his wife changed. She works late and avoids him. Once Kundavi finds out he does love her and how much he missed her during New York trip, she finds his lost love who had just returned from Australia. Ishwarya has become a modern girl in contrast to the demure salwar kameez girl she was in college, and completely ignores her father at the airport due to his past behaviour with her. Kundavi asks Ishwarya to visit them and she tells her husband that he should live happily with Ishwarya for a day and that for that one day, she and their daughter do not exist for him, and leaves Gowtham with Ishwarya.

Gowtham spends the day with Ishwarya. They travel to many places and do many things and recollect their memories. Ishwarya and Gowtham share their love for each other and how they missed each other during these 6 years of separation. They eventually fall in love with each other all over again and soon get intimate. It is then revealed that all these things were just Kundavi's dream. Panicked by the dream, Kundavi decides to check up on them. When she gets back home dreading, she finds her husband alone. She asks him where Ishwarya is and finds Ishwarya's letter. In it, Ishwarya says that Kundavi gave them a day, but an hour was sufficient for them. 40 minutes of silence, 10 minutes of formal inquiries and 10 minutes of talking. Even in that 10 minutes talk with him, the words that came out of Gowtham was 'Kundavi' only. Ishwarya realises that Gowtham and Kundavi are both are immensely in love and leading a very happy life. Ishwarya stated that she wants to love Gowtham in her next birth also, but as Kundavi instead of as herself. She wishes the couple a happy life and leaves, never to return.

In the end, Gowtham confesses that he had hidden the secret of loving someone so that Kundavi doesn't get hurt as any girl would not bear her husband's love being shared. However, unlike others, Kundavi has brought the girl her husband loved in order to make him happy. They then cry in happiness and hug each other while Diwali fireworks blossom. Their daughter Ishu also joins them and the movie ends on a happy note.

== Cast ==
Opening credits

- Suriya as R. Gowtham
- Jyothika as Kundavi / "Jill"
- Bhoomika as Ishwarya / "Ishu"
- Sukanya as Nirmala, Kundavi's boss
- Vadivelu as Vellasamy, Gowtham's co-brother
- Santhanam as Rajesh
- Costumes Krishna as Ishwarya's father
- Thambi Ramaiah as Vellasamy's assistant
- Shriya Sharma as Ishwarya / "Ishu", Gowtham and Kundavi's daughter

Closing credits

- Meenal as Subbu, Kundavi's friend
- Srividhya as Tamil, Kundavi's friend
- Vijay Ganesh as Villager
- Halwa Vasu as Villager
- Muthukaalai as Villager
- Nellai Siva as Villager

Uncredited

- Sudha as Ishwarya's mother (special appearance in the song "Munbe Vaa")
- Anthony as Automobile Engineer
- R. D. Rajasekhar as Villager
- Shobhana as Chellathaayi
- Kannan Ponnaiya as Senior College Student
- Pandiyan as Subbu's father
- Vidhu (special appearance in "Munbe Vaa")

== Production ==
The film, originally titled Jillendru Oru Kaadhal, was retitled Sillunu Oru Kaadhal to avail entertainment tax exemption. It is the directorial debut of Krishna. He revealed that Suriya was initially reluctant to sign the film as it required him to play a father. Jyothika was Krishna's first and only choice for the lead actress. Asin was selected for another key role after her successful pairing with Suriya in Ghajini (2005). However, by the time production began, Bhumika Chawla had replaced her. The film was shot extensively in Visakhapatnam, Coimbatore and Chennai. The Tamil Nadu Agricultural University and Andhra University were also key filming locations. The song "New York Nagaram" was shot in Lucerne, Switzerland.

== Soundtrack ==
Sillunu Oru Kaadhal

Soundtrack album by A. R. Rahman
- Released: 2 August 2006
- Recorded: 2006
- Studio: Panchathan Record Inn and AM Studios
- Genre: Film soundtrack
- Length: 41:02 / 40:45
- Languages: Tamil; Telugu
- Labels: Star Music (India); KM Musiq (Worldwide); Aditya Music (Telugu)
- Producer: A. R. Rahman

A. R. Rahman chronology
Rang De Basanti (2006)	Sillunu Oru Kaadhal (2006)	Varalaru (2006)

The soundtrack was composed by A. R. Rahman.

All lyrics are written by Vaali.

Track listing
No.	Title	Artist(s)	Length
1.	"Kummi Adi"	Sirkazhi G. Sivachidambaram, Swarnalatha, Naresh Iyer, Theni Kunjarammal, Vignesh, Chorus	6:54
2.	"Maaza Maaza"	S. P. Charan, Shreya Ghoshal	5:43
3.	"Machhakkari"	Shankar Mahadevan, Vasundhara Das	5:32
4.	"New York Nagaram"	A. R. Rahman	6:19
5.	"Maaricham"	Caralisa Monteiro, Mohammed Aslam, Krishna Iyer	6:10
6.	"Jillendru Oru Kaadhal"	Tanvi Shah, Bhargavi Pillai	4:23
7.	"Munbe Vaa"	Shreya Ghoshal, Naresh Iyer	5:59
Total length:			41:02

All lyrics are written by Veturi.

Telugu track listing
No.	Title	Singer(s)	Length
1.	"Ammadini Chusesthi"	Sirkazhi G. Sivachidambaram, Gomathi, Naresh Iyer, Theni Kunjarammal, Vignesh, Chorus	6:52
2.	"Maja Maja"	S. P. Charan, Shreya Ghoshal	5:42
3.	"Bangaraani"	Shankar Mahadevan, Sunitha Sarathy	5:31
4.	"New York Nagaram"	A. R. Rahman	6:19
5.	"Gaandharvam"	Sayanora Philip, Caralisa Monteiro, Mohammed Aslam, Krishna Iyer	6:07
6.	"Jil Jillumanna Prema"	Tanvi Shah	4:19
7.	"Preminche Premavaa"	Shreya Ghoshal, Naresh Iyer	5:55
Total length:			40:45

== Release ==
The satellite rights of the film were sold to Kalaignar TV. The film was cleared by the censor board on 4 September 2006 and was given a U/A certificate, with some dialogue muting. Initially scheduled as an August 2006 release, the film was delayed to avoid a clash with Jyothika's other film Vettaiyaadu Vilaiyaadu. The film opened across 207 screens worldwide on 8 September 2006, three days before the wedding of Suriya and Jyothika. The film received a large opening. It was later dubbed and released in Telugu as Nuvvu Nennu Prema.

=== Critical response ===
S. R. Ashok Kumar of The Hindu gave the film a negative review, claiming that "The most talked about movie of the year, Studio Green's Sillunu Oru Kadhal featuring Suriya and Jyotika, arrives only to disappoint", further stating, "it lacks a strong cohesive script to bind the elements". Lajjavathi of Kalki praised the acting of Suriya, the editing and cinematography and noted the romance between Suriya and Jyothika had more depth than flashback love with Bhumika Chawla and panned Vadivelu's humour. Lajjavathi concluded saying if one watches the film without much expectation, they can enjoy it. Cinesouth wrote, "The director N Krishna has done a great job of a realistic depiction of Surya and Jyotika's married life within their four walls. But he has slipped up a bit when it comes to the college flashback in the second half". Sify wrote, "Editor Antony could have made the film crisper as it is too long (2 hrs 50 min) and the film drags in the second half. Nevertheless, go and watch the film for all the hype and hoopla surrounding it". Malini Mannath of Chennai Online wrote, "Debutant director Krishna, who's apprenticed under director Gautham, weaves in a fairly engaging story of love-after-marriage, and the complications in the life of the protagonist when his first love returns and threatens to destroy his marital peace and happiness. The director has attempted to give the love triangle a new look, and a slightly different perspective, and like Gautham, a glossy, technically slick look to his narration".

=== Accolades ===
Rahman won the Filmfare Award for Best Music Director – Tamil. Ghoshal won the Filmfare Award for Best Female Playback Singer – Tamil, and the Tamil Nadu State Film Award for Best Female Playback Singer.
