= Pushkar Films =

Indian film production company

- Company type: Private
- Industry: Entertainment
- Founded: 2016
- Founders: Pushkara Mallikarjunaiah
- Headquarters: Bangalore, Karnataka, India
- Products: Films
- Services: Film Production; Film Marketing; Film Distribution
- Website: pushkarfilms.com

Pushkar films is a production house created by Pushkara Mallikarjunaiah who hails from Tumkuru District of Karnataka.

== Films produced ==
Key
†	Denotes films that have not yet been released

Year	Film	Director	Actors	Language	Notes
2016	Godhi Banna Sadharana Mykattu	Hemanth Rao	Anant Nag, Rakshit Shetty, Vasishta N. Simha	Kannada	Won Bengaluru International Film Festival Award
2016	Kirik Party	Rishab Shetty	Rakshit Shetty, Rashmika Mandanna, Samyuktha Hegde	Kannada	
2017	Huliraaya	Arvind Kaushik	Balu Nagendra	Kannada	Presented & Distribution
2018	Humble Politician Nograj	Saad Khan	Danish Sait, Vijay Chendoor, Sumukhi Suresh, Roger Narayan, Sruthi Hariharan	Kannada	
2018	Katheyondu Shuruvagide	Senna Hegde	Diganth, Pooja Devariya	Kannada	
2018	Mercury	Karthik Subbaraj	Prabhu Deva, Sananth Reddy	Kannada	Distribution Only
2018	Jeerjimbe	Karthik Saragur	Suman Nagarkar	Kannada	
2019	Avane Srimannarayana	Sachin Ravi	Rakshit Shetty, Shanvi Srivastava	Kannada	
2020	Popcorn Monkey Tiger	Duniya Soori	Dhananjaya, Amrutha Iyengar	Kannada	Distribution Only
2020	Bheemasena Nalamaharaja	Karthik Saragur	Aravinnd Iyer, Arohi Narayan	Kannada	
2022	Avatara Purusha	Suni	Sharan, Ashika Ranganath	Kannada	
2022	Avatara Purusha 2	Suni	Sharan, Ashika Ranganath	Kannada	
