= Paramvah Studios =

Indian film studio

- Type: Private
- Industry: Entertainment
- Founded: 2015
- Founders: Govind Sahai Gupta; Rakshit Shetty
- Headquarters: Bengaluru, Karnataka, India
- Products: Films
- Services: Film Production; Film Marketing; Film distribution
- Subsidiaries: Paramvah Spotlight; Paramvah Pictures; Paramvah Music; Pinaka Studios
- Website: paramvah.com

Paramvah Studios is an Indian film studio involved in distribution and production. It is located in Bengaluru.

== Establishment ==
Rakshit Shetty, a well-known actor, director, writer, and lyricist in Kannada cinema established Paramvah in 2015 as a platform to encourage new voices and talent from Karnataka after his Simple Agi Ondh Love Story (2013), Ulidavaru Kandanthe (2014), and Kirik Party (2016) won several film awards. The company was inaugurated by Puneeth Rajkumar in Nagadevanahalli, Bengaluru. The production company over the years has a reputation of bringing in new talents with fresh scripts and ideas to screens.

== Films produced ==
Key
†	Denotes films that have not yet been released

Year	Film	Director	Notes
2016	Kirik Party	Rishab Shetty	
2017	Huliraaya	Aravind Kaushik	Distribution
2018	Humble Politician Nograj	Saad Khan	Co-Producer
2018	Katheyondu Shuruvagide	Senna Hegde	Co-Producer
2019	Avane Srimannarayana	Sachin Ravi	Co-Producer
2020	Bheemasena Nalamaharaja	Karthik Saragur	Co-Producer
2021	Garuda Gamana Vrishabha Vahana	Raj B Shetty	Presentation
2022	777 Charlie	Kiranraj K	
2022	Sakutumba Sametha	Rahul P K	
2022	Gargi	Gautham Ramachandran	Tamil film; Distribution
2023	Hostel Hudugaru Bekagiddare	Nithin Krishnamurthy	Presentation
2023	Sapta Saagaradaache Ello: Side A	Hemanth M. Rao	
2023	Sapta Saagaradaache Ello: Side B	Hemanth M. Rao	
2023	Mithya	Sumanth Bhat	Premiered at MAMI Mumbai 2023
2024	Bachelor Party	Abhijit Mahesh	
2024	Ekam	Sumanth Bhat, Sandeep P S	Presentation (series)
2024	Ibbani Tabbida Ileyali	Chandrajith Belliappa	
2024	Abracadabra	Shishir Rajmohan	Screened at BIFF 2024.

== Awards ==
‘Kirik Party’ won several awards after its release in 2017.

IIFA Utsavam (March 2017)- Best Film, Best leading Role, Best Music Direction, Best Lyrics, Best Male Playback Singer.

Karnataka State Film Awards (April 2017) – Popular Entertaining Film

Filmfare Awards South (June 2017) – Best Director, Best Actor, Best Supporting Actress, Best Music Director, Best Male Playback Singer

South Indian International Movie Awards (July 2017) – Best Film, Best Director, Best Supporting Actor, Best Debut Actress, Best Music Director, Best Lyricist, Entertainer of the Year.
