= Pushkara Mallikarjunaiah =

Indian film producer (born 1980)

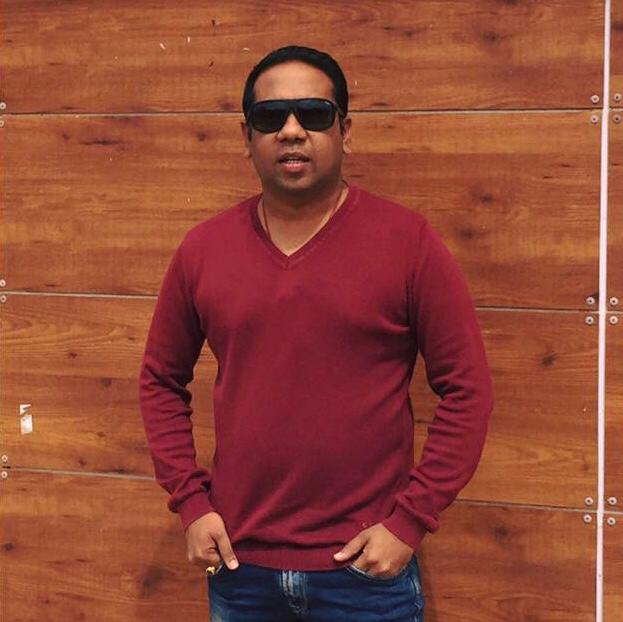
- Born: 11 September 1980 (age 45); Koratagere, Tumkur district, Karnataka, India
- Education: B.E, Mechanical Engineering, MS Ramaiah Institute of Technology; M.S., Automotive, University of Hertfordshire
- Occupation: Film Producer
- Years active: 2013–present
- Known for: Godhi Banna Sadharana Mykattu; Kirik Party; Humble Politician Nograj
- Awards: Bengaluru International Film Festival Award–2017

Pushkara Mallikarjunaiah is an Indian producer best known for his Kannada films. His debut film Godhi Banna Sadharana Mykattu was a blockbuster hit which was released in 2016 followed by another collaboration with actor and producer Rakshit Shetty in Kirik Party which is now all-time top three hit movies in Kannada. He co-produced the multiple award-winning Kannada film Jeerjimbe.

== Early life ==
Pushkara Mallikarjunaiah was born on 11 September 1980 to K.N Mallikarjunaiah and Manjula Devi B.S in, a Koratagere town in Tumkur district, Karnataka. Pushkar graduated with a Bachelor of Engineering degree in Mechanical from M S Ramaiah Institute of Technology in 2003 and further pursued his M.S. in Automotive (UK) from the University of Hertfordshire from United Kingdom in 2005. Later worked as a SAP consultant for few years and quit his job to live his dream as an entrepreneur. He then started his construction business from the year 2009. His film journey started in the year 2016 with a blockbuster hit Godhi Banna Sadharana Mykattu.

== Career ==
Pushkar's debut production Godhi Banna Sadharana Mykattu which was directed by Hemanth Rao, starring Anant Nag and Rakshit Shetty produced under his banner Pushkar Films went on to become a blockbuster hit. The movie is amongst the all-time top 3 highest grossing Kannada movie in terms of overseas collection. It stands at 4th position in terms of number of shows played at Karnataka Multiplexes.

His next project was Kirik Party, where he bought a stake of 30% under his banner Pushkar Films was yet another blockbuster. The film was released in 2016, this movie created a history of becoming 2nd highest profitable movie in Kannada cinema with a near turnover of more than 40 crores and the movie is still running in theaters heading towards completing its 100 days run. Pushkara Mallikarjunaiah's upcoming production venture is titled as Humble Politician Nograj starring Danish Sait. Produced under his banner Pushkar films in association with Rakshit Shetty’s Paramvah Studios, this movie is expected to be released in August 2017.

Pushkar received the Bengaluru International Film Festival award during February 2017 for his debut production film Godhi Banna Sadharna Mykattu as the 3rd best Kannada cinema.

== Filmography ==
Key
†	Denotes films that have not yet been released

No	Year	Film	Director	Actors	Language	Notes
1	2016	Godhi Banna Sadharana Mykattu	Hemanth Rao	Anant Nag, Rakshit Shetty, Vasishta N. Simha	Kannada	Won Bengaluru International Film Festival Award
2	2016	Kirik Party	Rishab Shetty	Rakshit Shetty, Rashmika Mandanna, Samyuktha Hegde	Kannada	30% Stake holder
3	2017	Huliraaya	Arvind Kaushik	Balu Nagendra	Kannada	Presented & Distribution
4	2018	Humble Politician Nograj	Saad Khan	Danish Sait	Kannada	Producer
5	2018	Mercury	Karthik Subbaraj	Prabhu Deva	Silent	Distribution
6	2018	Katheyondu Shuruvagide	Senna Hegde	Diganth, Pooja Devariya	Kannada	Producer
7	2018	Jeerjimbe	Karthik Saragur	Siri Vanalli, Lavanya	Kannada	Co-Producer along with Beehive Productions. This film won four Karnataka State Film Awards, the most for any film in 2017
8	2019	Avane Srimannarayana	Sachin Ravi	Rakshit Shetty, Shanvi Srivastava	Kannada	Producer
9	2020	Bheema Sena Nala Maharaja	Karthik Saragur	Aravinnd Iyer, Arohi Narayan	Kannada	Producer
10	2021	Thinkalazhcha Nishchayam	Senna Hegde	Manoj K. U., Ajisha Prabhakaran, Anagha Narayanan, Unnimaya Nalppadam, Sunil Surya	Malayalam	Producer
11	2022	Avatara Purusha	Suni	Sharan Ashika Ranganath	Kannada	Producer
12	2022	10	Karm Chawla	Vinay Rajkumar	Kannada	Producer
13	2024	Avatara Purusha 2	Suni	Sharan Ashika Ranganath	Kannada	Producer
14	2026	Vijayanagara Samrajya	Pushkara Mallikarjunaiah	Pushkara Mallikarjunaiah	Kannada, Telugu, English	Producer

== Awards ==
Year	Award	Category	Result
2017	Bengaluru International Film Festival Award	3rd Best Film	Won
2017	Karnataka State Film Awards	Best children film	Won
2020	68th National Film Awards	Best Feature Film in Malayalam	Won
2021	51st Kerala State Film Awards	Second Best Film for Thinkalazhcha Nishchayam	Won
