= Charan Raj (composer) =

Indian music composer and singer

Background information
- Born: January 27, 1985 (age 41); Kodagu, Karnataka, India
- Occupations: Singer; music director; arranger
- Instrument: Piano
- Years active: 2014–present

Charan Raj is an Indian composer and singer known for his work in Kannada cinema. For his work in Jeerjimbe (2016), he was awarded the Karnataka State Film Award for Best Music Director.

== Early life ==
Charan Raj attended Sri Ramakrishna Vidya Shala, a residential school in Mysore. He was part of the music group there. Raj is trained in classical Carnatic music with Perumbavoor G. Raveendranath and in Western Classical music with Neecia Majolly. He also holds a grade eight certificate in piano from the London School of Music.

== Career ==
Raj's first major success came when Winds of Samsara, an album of Ricky Kej and Wouter Kellerman won the Grammy Award for Best New Age Album in 2015. The album also featured vocals by Raj. During the time, he also worked as an arranger for composers such as Prashant Pillai.

Raj's first work in Kannada films came in Harivu in 2014. He received acclaim for his work in Godhi Banna Sadharana Mykattu. He scored for Pushpaka Vimana. For his work in Jeerjimbe (2016), he was awarded the Karnataka State Film Award for Best Music Director.

Raj received praise for his music in the 2018 film Tagaru. The soundtrack included tracks with blend of "electronic score" and "traditional sounds". It was composed with each track based on a different "human emotion" "such as love, anger and fear" rather than situation-based nature of tracks. In its review of the film, the New Indian Express wrote, "Charan Raj's music raises the tempo of the narrative with good songs, and lets it flow seamlessly with the right background score."

In 2023, Raj joined forces with Sanjith Hegde and Prassanna Hegde for Coke Studio Bharat's first Kannada song "Geejaga Hakki" which draws inspiration from various retellings of Raja Harishchandra's story. The song became an instant hit among the audience.

Saptha Sagaradache Ello movie which was released as two part Romantic drama in 2023 fetched him more accolades with his varied music and heart stirring background score and songs. The Entire album was a hit among critics and Audience. The film marked his third combination with Hemanth Rao who has been his go to collaborator.

== Discography ==
List of Charan Raj music credits
Year	Album	Notes
2008	Thaalam	Malayalam Album
2014	Winds of Samsara	Vocals; Grammy Award for Best New Age Album
2014	Harivu	Feature film
2016	Godhi Banna Sadharana Mykattu	
2016	Mandya to Mumbai	
2017	Pushpaka Vimana	
2018	Tagaru	
2018	Dalapathi	
2018	Jeerjimbe	
2019	Kavaludaari	
2019	Avane Srimannarayana	2 Songs only
2020	Popcorn Monkey Tiger	
2020	Bheema Sena Nala Maharaja	
2021	Salaga	
2022	James	Special Appearance
2022	Head Bush	
2023	Sapta Saagaradaache Ello – Side A	
2023	Sapta Saagaradaache Ello – Side B	
2023	Bad Manners	
2024	Somu Sound Engineer	
2024	Bheema	
2025	Royal	
2025	Uttarakaanda	Background score only
2025	Ekka	Also sang "Ekka Maar" and "Rowdy Rhymes"
2026	Maarnami	
2026	Mango Pachcha	Also sang "Hasaravva"
2026	Operation Dream Theater	
2026	City Lights	

== Awards ==
Film	Award	Category	Result	Ref
Godhi Banna Sadharana Mykattu	64th Filmfare Awards South	Best Music Director	Nominated	
Godhi Banna Sadharana Mykattu	6th SIIMA Awards	Best Music Director	Nominated	
Pushpaka Vimana	7th SIIMA Awards	Best Music Director	Nominated	
Jeerjimbe	2016 Karnataka State Film Awards	Best Music Director	Won	
Tagaru	66th Filmfare Awards South	Best Music Director	Nominated	
Tagaru	8th SIIMA Awards	Best Music Director	Nominated	
Kavaludaari	9th SIIMA Awards 2019	Best Music Director	Nominated	
Avane Srimannarayana	9th SIIMA Awards 2019	Best Music Director	Nominated	
Popcorn Monkey Tiger	9th SIIMA Awards 2020	Best Music Director	Nominated	
Popcorn Monkey Tiger	9th SIIMA Awards 2020	Best Male Playback Singer	Nominated	
Salaga	67th Filmfare Awards South	Best Music Director	Nominated	
Sapta Saagaradaache Ello	69th Filmfare Awards South	Best Music Director	Won	
