= Avihitham =

2025 Indian-Malayalam language film

- Directed by: Senna Hegde
- Written by: Ambareesh Kalathera; Senna Hegde
- Story by: Ambareesh Kalathera
- Produced by: Mukesh R. Mehta; Harris Desom; P. B. Anish; C. V. Sarathi; Senna Hegde
- Starring: Unni Raj; Renji Kankol; Vrinda Menon
- Cinematography: Sreeraj Raveendran; Ramesh Mathews
- Edited by: Sanath Sivaraj
- Music by: Sreerag Saji
- Production companies: E4 Experiments; Imagin Cinemas; Marley State of Mind
- Distributed by: E4 Experiments (Kerala); AP International (Rest of India); Home Screen Entertainment (GCC)
- Release dates: October 9, 2025 (GCC); October 10, 2025 (India)
- Running time: 106 minutes
- Country: India
- Language: Malayalam

Avihitham (transl. Illicit) is a 2025 Malayalam-language black comedy-drama film directed by Senna Hegde, who co-wrote the screenplay with Ambareesh Kalathera. The film has an ensemble cast including Unni Raj, Renji Kankol, Vineeth Chakyar, Dhanesh Koliyat, Rakesh Ushar and Vrinda Menon. It is produced by E4 Experiments in association with Imagin Cinemas and Marley State of Mind. Sreeraj Raveendran and Ramesh Mathews handle the cinematography and Sanath Sivaraj edits the film. Sreerag Saji composes the songs and background score.

Avihitham released theatrically on 9 October 2025 in GCC and on 10 October 2025 in India.

== Plot ==
One night, while returning home after drinking with friends, Prakashan comes across a young man named Vinod, a mill worker and a young woman behind the house of Madhavan, a carpenter working on a temple project in another village. The duo seems like a couple in love. Prakashan shares this matter with Venu, a tailor. The next night, Venu also witnesses the couple embracing. They think the young woman is Nirmala, Madhavan's daughter-in-law. They discussed among themselves the next steps and decided to tell Madhavan's younger son Murali. Murali informs Madhavan, who asks them to verify the news. Murali and his friend, Nidheesh follow Nirmala and see her talking to Vinod, and jump to the conclusion that she was indeed having an affair with Vinod. Madhavan informs Mukundan,Nirmala's husband, who is devastated. He leaves for home, disturbed and deciding to divorce her.

Mukundan also visits the mill where Vinod works, where Vinod casually mentions that he has talked to Nirmala, which strengthens their misunderstandings. Murali, further informs all their family members about the news and along with Venu, Prakashan, Nidheesh, Mukundan, their uncle Kumaran and cousin Mahesh draft an elaborate plan to catch Vinod and Nirmala red handed in front of the public.

The plan goes as per decided. However, surprisingly it's revealed that woman Vinod was with is not Nirmala but in fact, Mahesh's wife, Geetha. Nirmala is innocent and oblivious of all this. This discovery leads to a commotion, where Geetha lashes out about her unhappy marriage with Mahesh and that Vinod cared for her when none did.

Initially heartbroken that her loyalty was questioned, Nirmala eventually forgives everyone and reconciles with Mukundan.

== Cast ==
- Unni Raj as Venu
- Renji Kankol as Prakashan
- Vineeth Vasudevan as Vinod
- Dhanesh Koliyat as Murali
- Rakesh Ushar as Mukundan
- Vrinda Menon as Nirmala
- Ajith Punnad as Nidish
- Unnikrishnan Parappa as Madhavan
- Aneesh Chemmarathi as Mahesh
- T. Gopinathan as Kumaran
- Vijisha Nileshwar as Geetha
- Ammini Chandralayam as Sarojini Amma
- Parvana Raj as Meenu
- Beena Kodakkad as Savithri Amma
- Vismaya Sasikumar as Shalini
- Premalatha as Yamuna
- Shyamili Das as Rama
- Vipin K. as Dineshan
- Swapna Pallam as Radha
- Mukesh OMR as Babu
- Sayanth as Radha's Son
- Karthika Vijayakumar as Nisha
- Prabhakaran Velaswaram as Contractor Raghavan
- Shubha C. P. as Constable Suma
- Lakshmanan Manniath as Member Damu

== Soundtrack ==
Avihitham

Soundtrack album by Sreerag Saji
- Released: 2025
- Studios: Pop Media House, Ernakulam; VTP Studios, Ernakulam
- Genre: Feature film soundtrack
- Length: 7:32
- Language: Malayalam
- Label: E4 Entertainment

The soundtrack album of the film is composed by Sreerag Saji. The first single Ayyaye was released on 6 October 2025.

No.	Title	Lyrics	Singer(s)	Length
1.	"Ayyaye"	Titto P. Thankachen	Zia Ul Haq, Sreerag Saji	03:57
2.	"Vallatha Narakangal"	Titto P. Thankachen	Harikrishnan U.	00:56
3.	"Aaro Paranjarinja"	Harikrishnan U.	Mariya Johny	02:39
Total length:				07:32

== Release ==
=== Theatrical ===
The title poster of the film was released on 17 August 2025. The teaser of the film was released on 6 September 2025 and the trailer was released on 25 September 2025.

Avihitham released theatrically on 9 October 2025 by Home Screen Extertainment in GCC and on 10 October 2025 by E4 Experiments in Kerala and by AP International in the rest of India.

=== Home Media ===
The digital rights of the film is acquired by JioHotstar and started streaming from 14 November 2025.

== Reception ==
=== Critical reception ===
S. R. Praveen of The Hindu wrote a positive review, "In Avihitham, which does not have any big star and is propelled by the strength of its narrative, Hegde returns to his roots and sort of rediscovers his 'indie' mojo."

Anandu Suresh of The Indian Express rated the film 4/5 stars and wrote, "Intriguingly, the film even shifts into an edge-of-the-seat suspense drama at one point. Yet, director Senna Hegde ensures that the soul and core of Avihitham are never lost in the process."

Vivek Santhosh of The New Indian Express rated the film 3/5 stars and wrote, "In the end, Avihitham is a modest yet engaging satire that observes more than it surprises. It may lack the sparkle of Thinkalazhcha Nishchayam and tread familiar ground in its critique of male morality, but Senna’s control over tone and character keeps it steady and effective. With its dry humour and quiet irony, the film holds a mirror to small-town self-righteousness, showing how easily gossip turns into judgement in the hands of those least fit to make it."

Anjana George of The Times of India described the film as "a quirky, rustic comedy about voyeurism and secrets" and rated the film 3/5 stars. She wrote, "Avihitham is, at its core, a delightful peek into small-town voyeurism and moral theatre, a comedy of errors where curiosity becomes community entertainment. It’s rustic, witty, and brimming with unpolished charm."

Gayathri Krishna of OTTPlay rated the film 3.5/5 stars and wrote, "Senna Hegde's film is much more than just a story about an extramarital affair. Our patriarchal society, which still adheres to gender stereotypes, is closely examined but satirised."

Swathi P. Ajith of Onmanorama wrote a positive review, "Avihitham is a sharp, deceptively simple take on voyeurism and morality—a mirror held up to our collective hypocrisy, wrapped in pitch-perfect humour. Cleverly written, superbly acted, and endlessly entertaining, this is one film that absolutely deserves to be seen on the big screen."

Sajin Shrijith of The Week rated the film 4.5/5 stars and wrote, "Avihitham reminds us that some films are ill fit for big stars and that no matter how unfamiliar these actors may feel to us, if they can momentarily take us back to that time when we saw Priyadarshan's Mukunthetta Sumitra Vilikkunnu or Sreenivasan's Vadakkunokkiyanthram for the first time, when we were kids and yet to familiarize ourselves with not just Mohanlal or Sreenivasan, but also the immensely gifted legendary comedians who acted alongside in supporting roles, I think their mission is successful. If you, like me, hail from Kerala's Malabar region, you're most likely going to get more fun out of this than the others.

Vishal Menon of The Hollywood Reporter India described the film as "several LOL moments" and wrote, "Everything fits into place in Avihitham as it speaks about feminism and the dangers of moral policing without even trying to take a moral high ground. It is what it is, and it's not too surprising to notice how we, too, become part of these men, curious to find out who this woman could be."
