= 1744 White Alto =

- Theatrical release poster
- Directed by: Senna Hegde
- Written by: Senna Hegde
- Screenplay by: Senna Hegde; Sreeraj Raveendran
- Produced by: Mrinal Mukundan; Sreejith Nair; Vinod Divakar
- Starring: Sharaf U Dheen; Rajesh Madhavan; Vincy Aloshious
- Cinematography: Sreeraj Raveendran
- Edited by: Harilal K Rajeev
- Music by: Mujeeb Majeed
- Production company: Kabinii Films
- Distributed by: Dream Big Films
- Release date: 18 November 2022
- Country: India
- Language: Malayalam

1744 White Alto is a 2022 Indian Malayalam-language comedy crime drama film written and directed by Senna Hegde. The film stars Sharaf U Dheen, Rajesh Madhavan and Vincy Aloshious in the lead roles. The film got negative reviews and became a box office bomb.

== Plot ==
Vijayan, a lowlife, gets involved in a case of mistaken identity. His car gets swapped with that of two small-time crooks. With the local police, and the criminals in pursuit, a cat-and-mouse chase ensues.

== Cast ==
- Sharaf U Dheen as Inspector Mahesh
- Rajesh Madhavan
- Vincy Aloshious as Rinnie Mahesh
- Anand Manmadhan
- Navas Vallikkunnu
- Arun Kurian
- Sajin Cherukayil
- Arya Salim
- Joji John
- Nilja K Baby
- Ranji Kankol
- Sminu Sijo
- Ashokan P, Kalyan Road
- Sinoj Varghese as Jacob

== Music ==
Senna roped in Mujeeb Majeed for the music and background score. This is their second collaboration since Thinkalazhcha Nishchayam.

No.	Title	Lyrics	Singer(s)
1	Disguise	Shah	Shah
2	Watta	Shiboo Shamz, Shah	Shiboo Shamz, Shah, J'mymah
3	Theeye	Haritha Haribabu	Anne Amie
4	Born from fire	J'mymah	J'mymah
