= Premier Padmini =

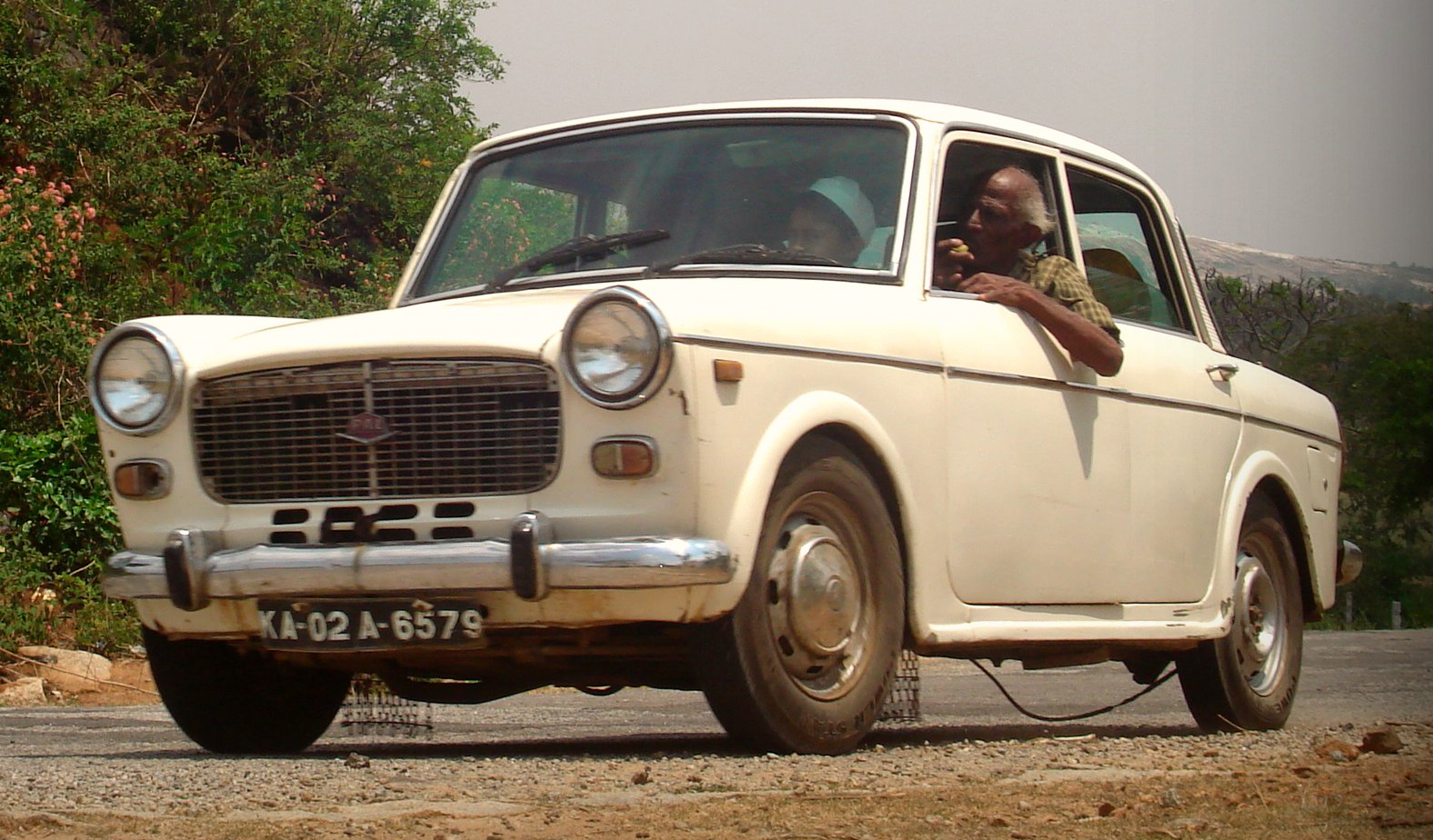

Overview
- Manufacturer: Premier Automobiles Limited
- Also called: Fiat 1100 Delight; Premier President
- Production: 1964–2001
- Assembly: India: Kurla, Mumbai

Body and chassis
- Class: Compact car
- Body style: 4-door saloon
- Layout: FR layout
- Related: Fiat 1100D

Powertrain
- Engine: 1,089 cc Fiat 103 I4; 1,366 cc "PAD 137N" diesel I4
- Transmission: 4-speed manual

Dimensions
- Wheelbase: 2,340 mm (92 in)
- Length: 3,905–3,940 mm (153.7–155.1 in)
- Width: 1,460 mm (57 in)
- Height: 1,470 mm (58 in)
- Kerb weight: 895 kg (1,973 lb)

Chronology
- Predecessor: Fiat 1100
- Successor: Premier 118NE

The Premier Padmini is a four-seat saloon that was manufactured in India from 1964 to 2001 by Premier Automobiles Limited, a division of the Walchand Group, under licence from Fiat and marketed initially as the Fiat 1100 Delight — and from 1974 as the Premier Padmini. The Padmini's primary competitors in the Indian market were the Hindustan Ambassador and Standard Herald. This famous car ruled the Indian car market and its popularity peaked during 1970s and 80s. Known colloquially as the Pad, or Fiat (since the Padmini was originally a Fiat car), the Padmini is named after a 14th-century Rajput princess. Padmini translates to "she who sits on the lotus" and refers to the Goddess Lakshmi. It was also a common name for girls in India at the time.

== History ==
The Fiat 1100D, based on the Fiat 1200 GranLuce Berlina, debuted in India in 1964 with a carburetted 1,089 cc four-cylinder petrol engine — rather than the 1,221 cc engine fitted to the GranLuce in Italy. With a 10.8:1 compression ratio, it created 47 bhp (35 kW) at 4,800 rpm with a maximum torque of 7.20 kg⋅m (71 N⋅m; 52 lb⋅ft) at 3,000 rpm. The original transmission was a four-speed manual gearbox (without synchronized first gear), which drove the rear wheels via a live rear axle. Its shifter was mounted on the left of the steering column. Weighing 895 kg (1,973 lb), its top speed was 140 km/h (87 mph).

Premier manufactured the Padmini at their Kurla plant in Bombay (now Mumbai) until they sold a majority stake to Fiat SpA in September 1997. The licensed vehicle was initially marketed as the Fiat 1100 Delight. For model year 1973, it was marketed as the Premier President and subsequently as the Premier Padmini. At its peak during the 1970s and 1980s, the car achieved immense popularity among youngsters, celebrities and women. Compared to the Hindustan Ambassador, it looked more modern, was more fuel-efficient and was very easy to drive.

By the early 1980s, engine power was reduced to 42 bhp (31 kW) (at 5,000 rpm) with a modified carburettor to make it more fuel efficient. Premier began to offer an air-conditioner, leather upholstery, courtesy lights and tinted glass. These were considered luxuries in Indian cars at the time.

From the mid-1980s, with the advent of more modern, aesthetic and more fuel-efficient cars from Maruti Suzuki, the popularity of the Padmini slowly began to wane. The liberalisation of the Indian economy in 1991, which allowed foreign car manufacturers to launch operations in India, began the end for the Padmini. In 1996, Premier tried to revive the car's sagging fortunes with an updated model. Named the Padmini S1, this had a more modern radiator grille, bucket seats, a Nissan floor-shift synchronised gearbox and a more powerful engine thanks to a Solex carburetor and use of a thermostat-controlled electric fan with an output of 48 bhp (36 kW). A diesel variant, the 137D, was also introduced, with the hope of taking advantage of the rising popularity of diesel vehicles in India. Its engine was built under license from Fratelli Negri Macchine Diesel Sud (FNM), Italy, with a displacement of 1,366 cc and generating 45 bhp (34 kW). Its top speed was close to 140 km/h, and its fuel efficiency was 24 km/L. Production was shut down because of PAL's management problems.

While all cars built by Premier were four-door sedans, small companies such as Starline also offered other bodywork, mainly in the form of estates.

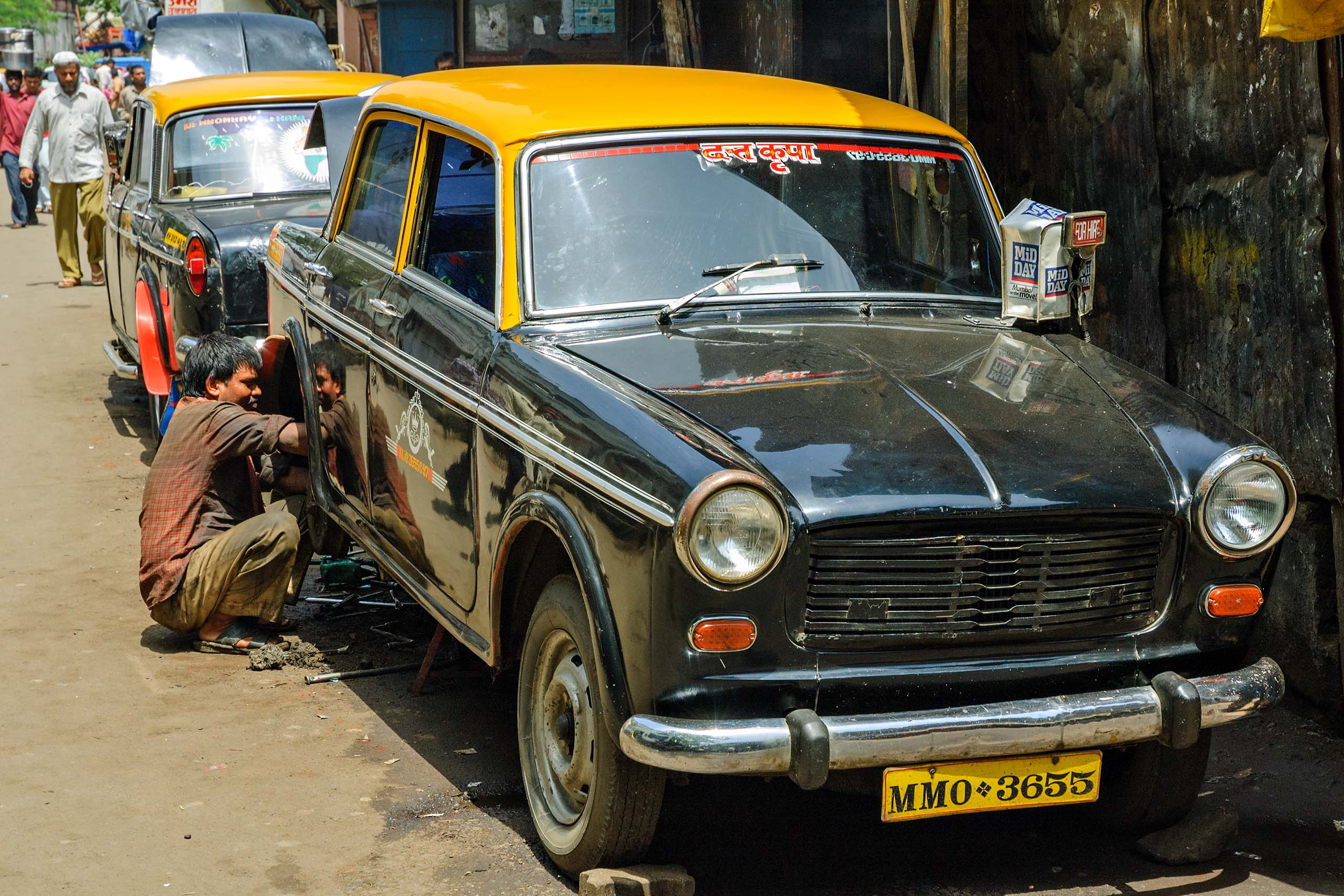
Premier Padmini driver doing maintenance on his Kaali-Peeli taxi, Mumbai, India

In the 2010s numerous examples served as taxicabs in Mumbai; known colloquially as "Kaali Peeli" (Black and Yellow). However, these were being phased out due to regulations enacted in 2013 by the government disallowing vehicles over 20 years old. The Premier Padmini taxis were finally taken off Mumbai roads on 30 October 2023.

== Models ==
- Premier Padmini BE Deluxe
- Premier Padmini BU Deluxe
- Premier Padmini 137D S1
- Premier Padmini Starline 'Safari' Station Wagon
- Premier President (Diesel)

== Gallery ==
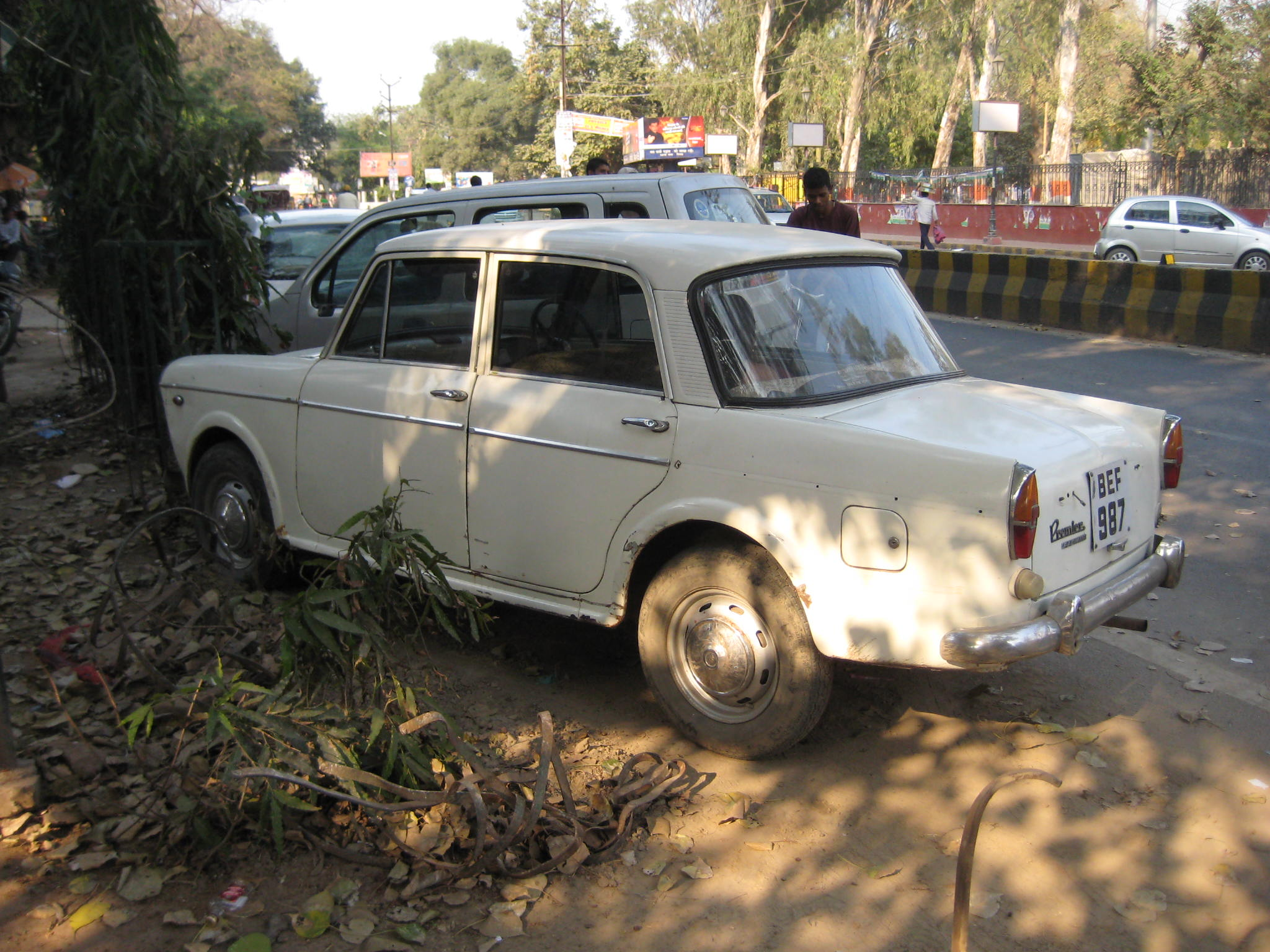
Premier Padmini

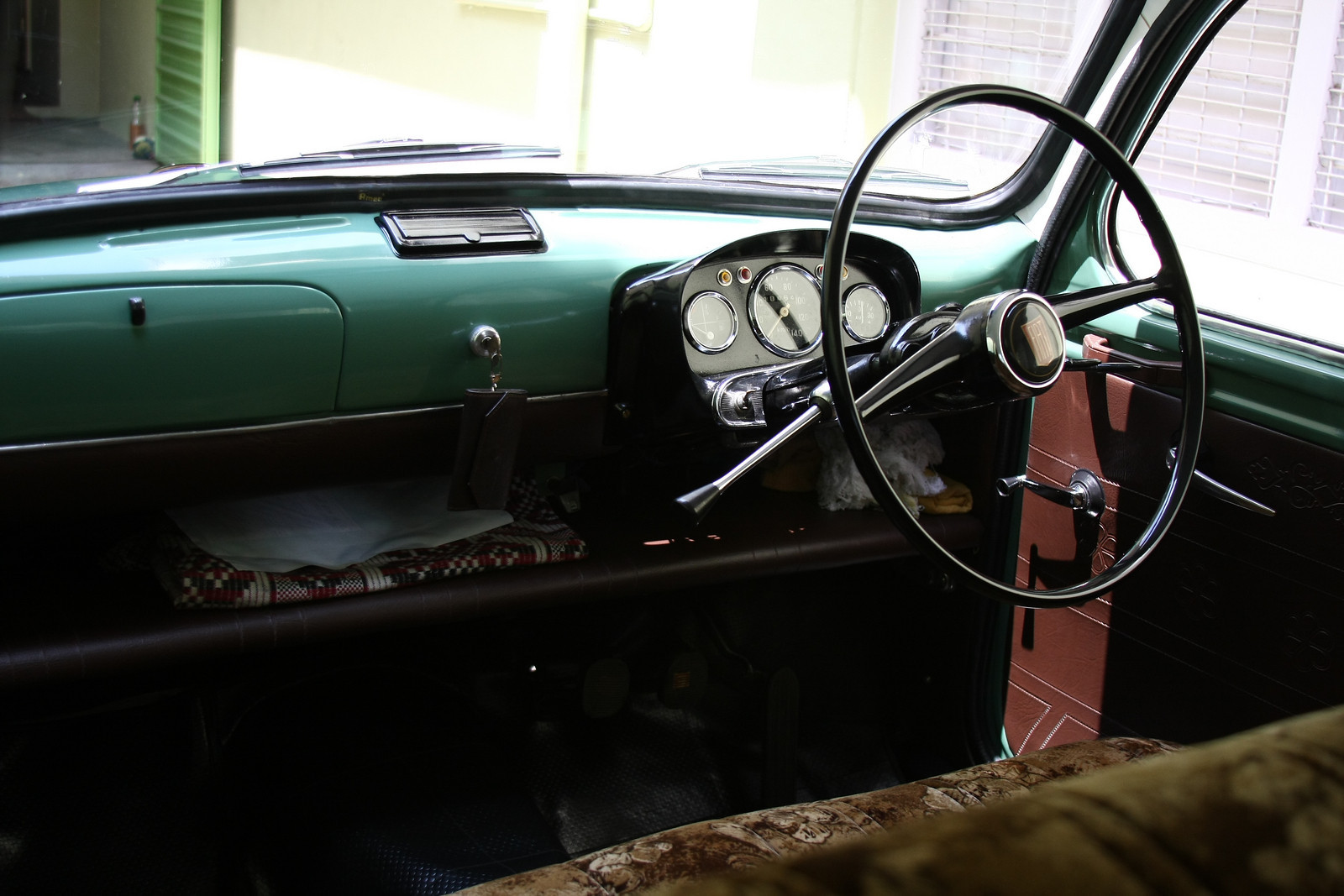
Early model Fiat 1100 interior

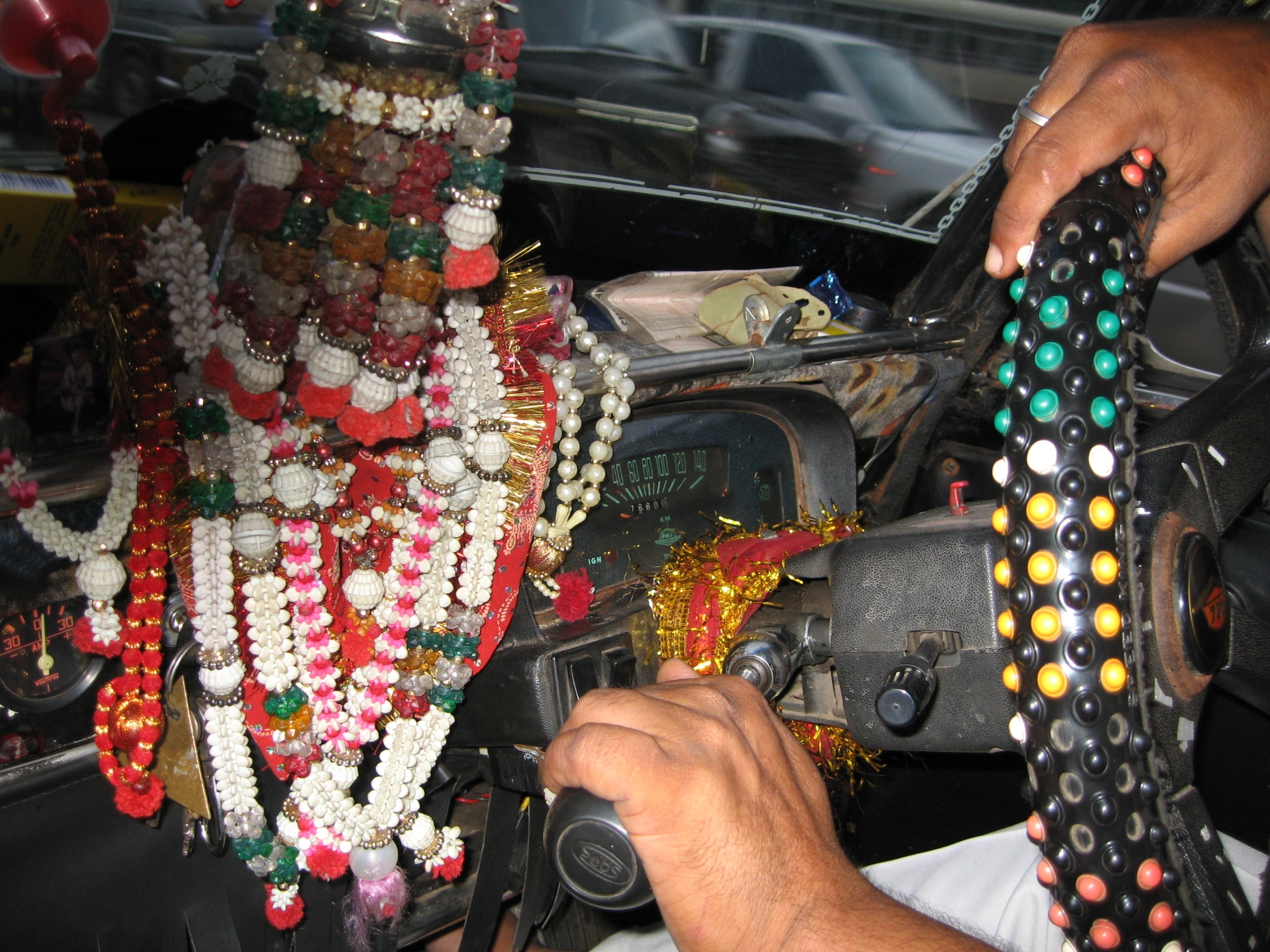
A heavily decorated dashboard in a Mumbai taxi. Note the left-handed column shift for the manual transmission.

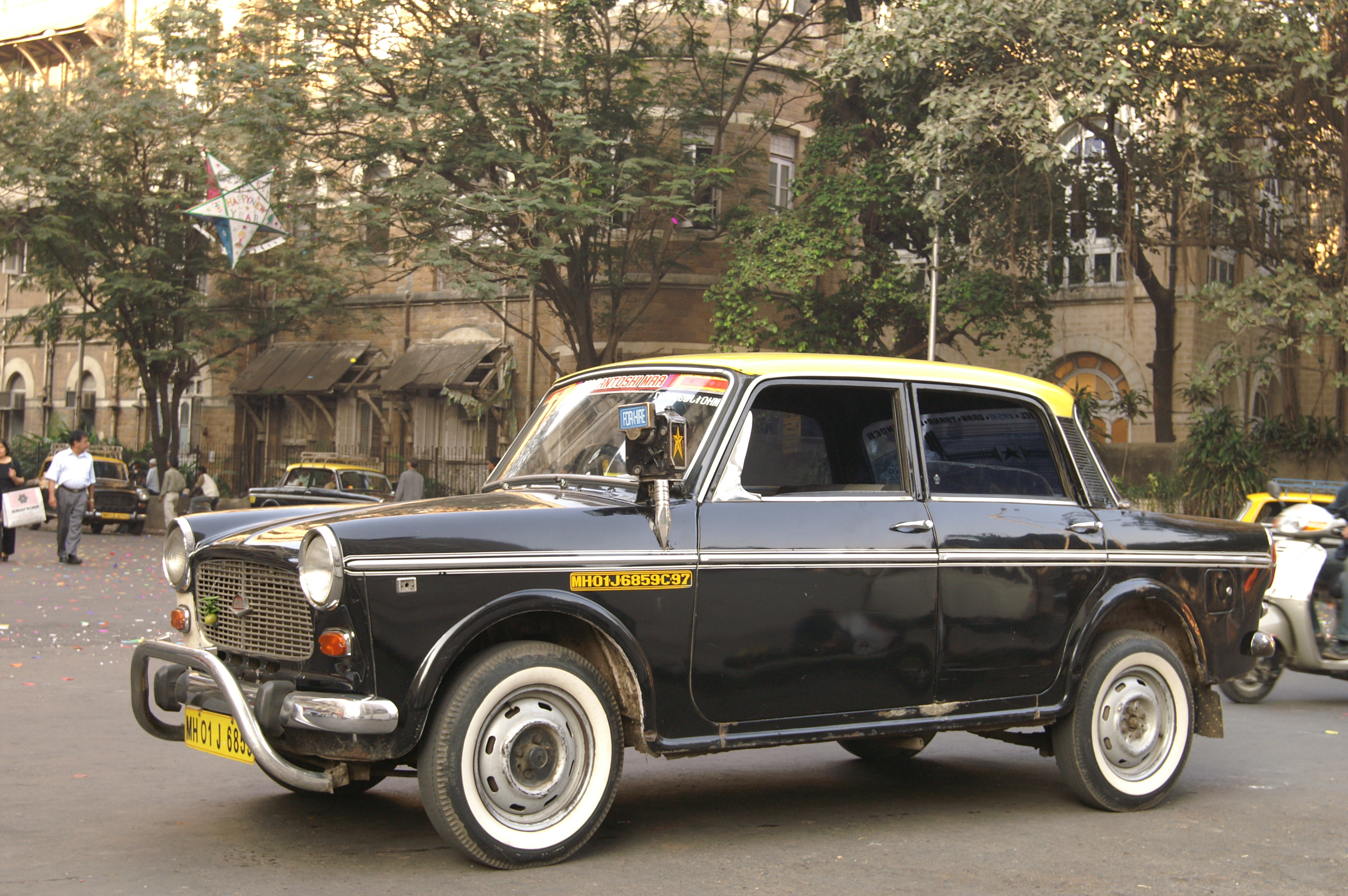
Premier Padmini taxi, Mumbai

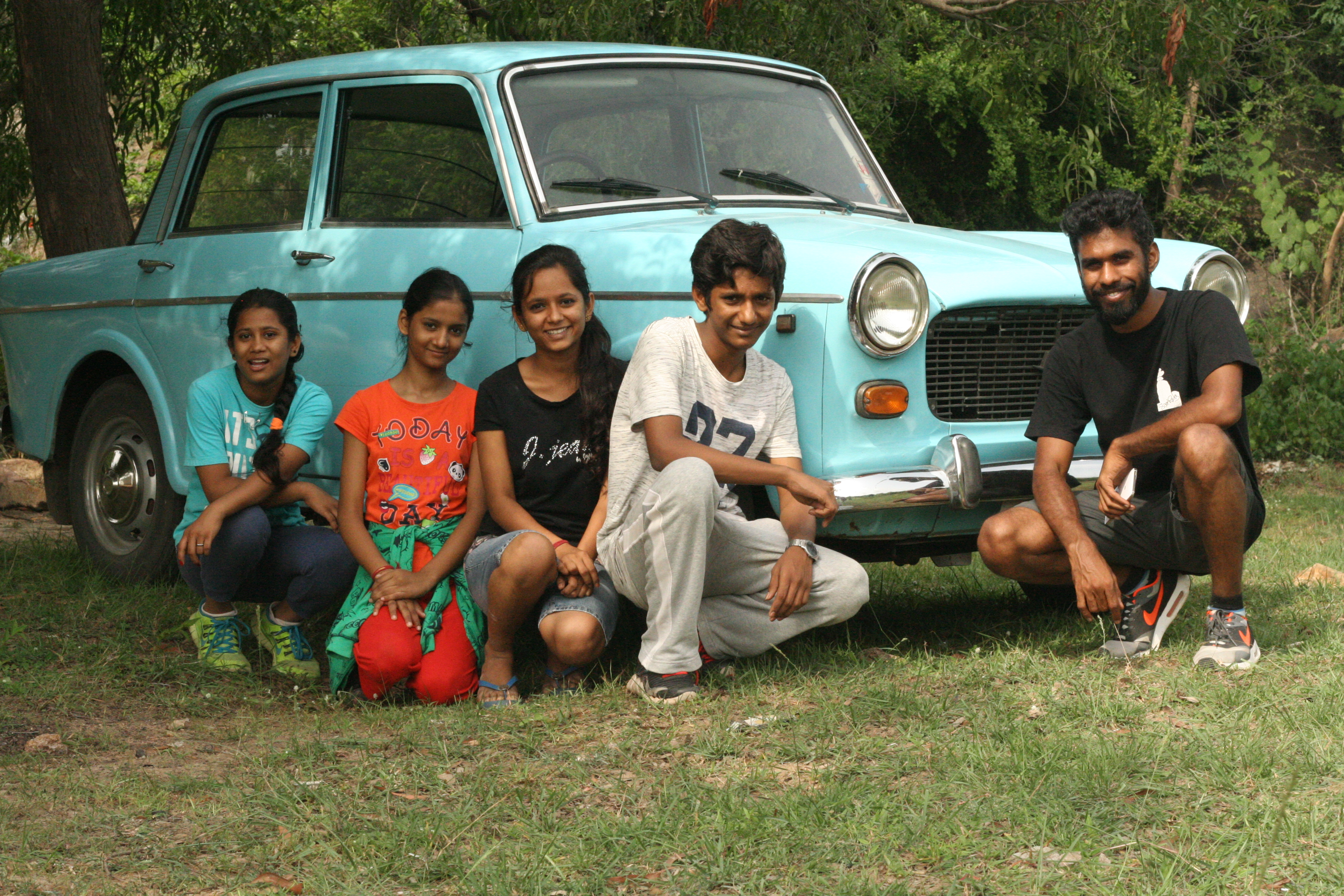
Premier Padmini in Hyderabad

== See also ==
- Premier Automobiles Limited
- Premier Padmini, a Kannada language film of same name
- Pannaiyarum Padminiyum, a Tamil language film in which the story is about the car and a family
- Padmini, a Malayalam language film in which the protagonist's life takes an ugly turn due to an incident, in which the car has been used
