= Costruzioni Motori Diesel =

Italian marine engine company

CMD – Costruzioni Motori Diesel S.p.A.
- Formerly: FNM – Fratelli Negri Macchine Diesel Sud S.r.l.
- Company type: Private
- Industry: Metal engineering
- Founded: 1991; 35 years ago in San Nicola la Strada, Italy
- Founder: Negri brothers
- Headquarters: Atella, Basilicata (Production plant and registered office); San Nicola la Strada, Campania (Sales management)
- Area served: Worldwide
- Key people: Giuseppe Catena
- Products: Inboard motors
- Website: www.cmdengine.com

The CMD – Costruzioni Motori Diesel S.p.A. (formerly FNM – Fratelli Negri Macchine Diesel Sud S.r.l.) is an Italian company that designs, develops, builds and markets marine engines, with its brand FNM Marine.

== History ==
The company was founded in 1971, under the name FNM – Fratelli Negri Macchine Diesel Sud, on the initiative of the Negri brothers. Initially, the activity focused on the revision of earthmoving machines, then expanding in the mid-70s, in the installation of diesel engines on used cars. Furthermore, towards the end of the decade, collaboration with Fiat began, which still represents an important slice of the company's business. In 2013, indeed, the company signed an agreement to produce engine heads for Maserati and Jeep.

In 1980, the GD 178 AT 1.3 supercharged diesel engine, entirely designed and built by FNM, was presented at the Turin International Motor Show.

In 1991, the company changed its name to CMD – Costruzioni Motori Diesel. In the 1990s, CMD inaugurated the Atella 1 plant, expanding its business producing and selling marine diesel engines. In 1996, FNM 1.4-liter diesel engines began to be installed in passenger cars built by India's Premier Automobiles, in two Fiat-derived models called the Premier 137D and 1.38D.

In the 2000s the company opened two new production plants, Atella 2 in 2004 and Morra De Sanctis in 2005. In 2017 67% of the share capital was held by the Chinese Loncin Holdings group, while the remaining 33% was in Italian hands. The official dealer is AS Labruna which is based in Monopoli, Apulia. In January 2026, brothers Giorgio and Mariano Negri bought back 67% of the company from Loncin for 17.4 million euros, and now control 100% of the share capital.

== Engines ==
The company builds various types of marine inboard motor including hybrids.

== Awards ==
- Premio ADI (Association for Industrial Design) 2019, at the 59° Salone Nautico di Genova thanks to the engine Blue Hybrid System.

== See also ==
- AS Labruna
- Inboard motor
- Fiat Chrysler Automobiles
