= AS Labruna =

Italian engine manufacturing and distribution company

AS Labruna S.R.L.
- Company type: Società a responsabilità limitata
- Industry: Engines
- Founded: 1971; 55 years ago
- Founder: Vito Labruna
- Headquarters: Monopoli, Apulia, Italy
- Area served: Worldwide
- Key people: Massimo Labruna
- Products: Inboard motors
- Owner: Labruna family
- Website: www.aslabruna.it

AS Labruna is an Italian marine engine manufacturer and distributor of engines for road transport, power generation and aircraft based in Monopoli, Apulia region of Italy.

In addition to its manufacturing product line, AS Labruna is an official distributor for other companies that produce industrial engines and related equipment.

== History ==
AS Labruna was founded in 1971 by Vito Labruna and produced and marketed marine diesel engines, marine generators, marine propulsion systems and marine cranes.

Marine is the unit that manufactures and markets marine diesel engines, marine generators, marine propulsion systems and marine cranes; Power is the section dedicated to the design and marketing of industrial diesel engines, vehicles and generators; The Loading sector deals with the marketing and installation of cranes, truck loaders and aerial platforms.

== Distributor ==
AS Labruna is an official distributor for the following companies:

- FPT (Fiat Powertrain Technologies formerly Iveco Aifo) for diesel engines and generators
- Ing. Bonfiglioli for cranes
- FNM Marine Diesel Engine
- VM Motori

== See also ==
- FNM Marine
- Inboard motor
- Labruna
