= Bheemasena Nalamaharaja =

- Official release poster
- Directed by: Karthik Saragur
- Written by: Karthik Saragur
- Produced by: Rakshit Shetty; Pushkara Mallikarjunaiah; Hemanth M. Rao
- Starring: Aravinnd Iyer; Swaroopinii; Priyanka Thimmesh; Achyuth Kumar
- Cinematography: Ravindranath
- Music by: Charan Raj
- Production companies: Paramvah Studios; Pushkar Films; Lost and Found Films
- Distributed by: Amazon Prime Video
- Release date: 29 October 2020
- Country: India
- Language: Kannada

Bheemasena Nalamaharaja (transl. Mighty King Nala) is a 2020 Indian Kannada-language drama film directed by Karthik Saragur and produced by Pushkara Mallikarjunaiah, Rakshit Shetty, and Hemanth M. Rao. The film stars Aravinnd Iyer, Swaroopinii, Priyanka Thimmesh and Achyuth Kumar. The soundtrack and score was composed by Charan Raj.

The title references characters from the Mahabharata—Bhimasena (Bhima) and Nala Maharaja—both renowned for their culinary skills. The narrative weaves themes of love, loss, and friendship, with food serving as a central motif. As per the director, the film is "based on six rasas—sweet, sour, salty, bitter, pungent and astringent, and the six characters represent six rasas."

Due to the COVID-19 pandemic, the film was streamed worldwide from 29 October 2020 on Amazon Prime Video as a part of their Great Indian Festival.

== Cast ==
- Aravinnd Iyer as Latthesh / Bheemasena Nalamaharaja, a passionate cook
- Swaroopinii as Dr. Arohi / Vedavalli Varadarajan, a rebellious Iyengar woman
- Priyanka Thimmesh as Vedavalli Varadarajan / Sarah Mary
- Achyuth Kumar as Varadarajan Iyengar
- Vijay Chendoor as Kenda
- Lakshmi Karanth as Saraswathy Varadarajan
- Sandhya Arakere as Kavitha
- Aadya Udupi as Lalli
- Amaan as Dr. Francis
- Pooja Kashyap as Veda's friend
- Chitrali Tejpal as Young Vedavalli
- Praveen Kumar Gasti as Worker at Nadimoola Resort
- Manas Gabriel as Aravind
- Deepa K N as Aravind's mother
- Meese Anjanappa as Hotel Owner
- Tushar Gowda as Young Latthesh
- Vinod Divakar as Church father

== Production ==
The film was officially launched on Varamahalakshmi festival day on 4 August 2017.

== Accolades ==
Award	Category	Recipient	Result	Ref
67th Filmfare Awards South	Best Actress	Aarohi Narayan	Nominated	
67th Filmfare Awards South	Best Supporting Actor	Achyuth Kumar	Nominated	
