= Dear Vaappi =

2023 Malayalam film

- Release poster
- Directed by: Shan Thulasi
- Written by: Shan Thulasi
- Produced by: R Muthaiah Murli
- Starring: Lal; Niranj Maniyanpilla Raju; Anagha Narayanan
- Edited by: Lijo Paul
- Music by: Kailas Menon
- Production company: Crown Films
- Release date: 17 February 2023
- Country: India
- Language: Malayalam

Dear Vaappi is a 2023 Indian Malayalam Language film directed by Shan Thulasi. It stars Lal, Niranj Maniyanpilla Raju, Anagha Narayanan while Sri Rekha, Jagadish, Maniyanpilla Raju, Sunil Sukhada, Jayakrishnan, Chembil Ashokan, Nirmal Palazhi, Neena Kurup etc. play supporting roles. Kailas Menon has composed 5 songs for the movie.

== Plot ==
Amira's father Basheer comes back to his hometown after 30 years of tailoring work in Mumbai and wanted to start his own business in hometown. The story is about the daughter Amira who supports his father for the venture and wanted to see her father's dream come true.

== Cast ==
- Lal as Tailor Basheer
- Anagha Narayanan as Amira
- Niranj Maniyanpilla Raju as Riyaz
- Sri Rekha as Juvairiya, Basheer's wife and Amira's mother
- Maniyanpilla Raju as Sherif, Riyas' father
- Sunil Sukhada as Suguna Textiles Owner
- Jayakrishnan as Haridas, a Businessman
- Chembil Ashokan as Madhvettan, shop owner
- Nirmal Palazhi as Najeeb, Riyaz's Brother In Law
- Neena Kurup as Ramla, Riys' mother
- Appunni Sasi as District collector Vijayan
- Abhiram Radhakrishnan as Ajith
- Manoranjan as Kalam mukry
- Jagadish as Himself (Cameo)
- Anu Sithara as Herself (Cameo)

== Production ==
The principal photography of the film was started in September 2022 and the first look of the film was released on 4 August 2022. The shooting of the film was held in Thalassery, Mahe, Mysore, Mumbai and the entire shooting was wrap up in October 2022. Later the teaser and the trailer was released.

== Box office ==
According to the source of Times of india the film collected the Rs 10 lakhs in 3 days.

== Release ==
The film was released on 17 February 2023 in theatres and started Over-the-top media service stream on 13 April 2023 on ManoramaMAX.

== Reception ==
Princy Alexander critic from Onmanorama stated that "However, while 'Dear Vaappi' has some interesting and feel-good moments, the excitement factor is slightly missing." A Tamil critic from Thanthi TV gave mixed reviews. Shilpa S critic from OTTplay gave 2.5 out of 5 and stated that "With its cliched, predictable story, black and white characters, and an insipid script, Dear Vaapi has very little to keep viewers engaged. But despite its mediocrity, the film does have a few bright spots in its third act, which tries to hold a mirror to the plight of entrepreneurs in the initial stage of setting up their businesses."

However, critics from ManoramaOnline and Samayam gave mixed reviews about the film.
