= Anpodu Kanmani =

Indian Malayalam-language drama film

- Theatrical release poster
- Directed by: Liju Thomaz
- Produced by: Vipin Pavithran
- Starring: Arjun Ashokan; Anagha Narayanan; Parvathi T.
- Music by: Samuel Aby
- Production company: Kreative Fish
- Release date: 24 January 2025
- Country: India
- Language: Malayalam

Anpodu Kanmani (transl. With love, beloved) is a 2025 Indian Malayalam-language drama film directed by Liju Thomaz starring Arjun Ashokan and Anagha Narayanan. The film depicts the struggles of a newly wed couple who are forced to face the irrelevant and irritating questions asked by the society around them.

== Plot ==
Anpodu Kanmani is a Malayalam family drama that delves into the societal pressures faced by newlyweds Nakulan and Shalini. Nakulan, portrayed by Arjun Ashokan, runs a laterite stone quarry business in a village in Kannur. Shalini, played by Anagha Narayanan, joins him as his wife, and together they begin their marital journey. Their initial months are filled with joy and mutual understanding. However, as time progresses, they are incessantly confronted with the question, "Any good news?" from family and community members, pressuring them about starting a family. This constant intrusion into their personal lives leads to mounting frustration and emotional turmoil. The narrative intensifies when Shalini confronts a particularly intrusive relative, leading to a pivotal moment in the story. The film poignantly portrays their struggle to balance personal desires with societal expectations, highlighting the emotional strain such pressures and invasion of privacy can inflict on a relationship.

== Cast ==
- Arjun Ashokan as Nakulan
- Anagha Narayanan as Shalini
- Navas Vallikkunnu as Shukkur
- Althaf Salim as Rafeeque
- Johny Antony as Dr.Rajeev
- Mala Parvathi as Rajamma
- Mridul Nair as Jithu
- Bhagath Manuel as Stephen

== Soundtrack ==
Samuel Aby composed the songs and background score for the film. Lyrics by Manu Manjith.

Track Listing
No.	Title	Singer(s)	Length
1.	"Mazhananavariyum"	K. S. Chithra
2.	"Vadakkudikkiloru"	Vineeth Sreenivasan, Sithara Krishnakumar
3.	"Ra Shalabhangalayi Nammal"	K. S. Harisankar
4.	"Naanam Melle Melle Matti"	Vineeth Sreenivasan, Angel Mary Joseph

== Release and Reception ==
The movie released in theatres on 24 January 2025 and started streaming on Amazon Prime Video from 28 March 2025.

Anjana George of The Times of India gave the film 3 out of 5 stars and wrote, "Anpodu Kanmani may not reinvent the wheel, but its honest storytelling and relatable characters make it worth a watch." Hari of Mathrubhumi wrote that "Heart-warming tale".

R. B. Sreelekha of ManoramaOnline wrote that "Simple film that brings tears of joy". A critic from Asianet News wrote that "Well rooted musical tale that touches the heart".
