= Anagha Narayanan =

Indian actress

- Born: January 2, 2000 (age 26); Kanhangad, Kerala, India
- Citizenship: Indian
- Occupation: Actor
- Years active: 2021 - present

Anagha Narayanan is an Indian actress who works primarily in Malayalam film industry. She's known for her role in Thinkalazhcha Nishchayam, Dear Vaappi and Anpodu Kanmani.

== Career ==
She began her career from Thinkalazhcha Nishchayam.

== Filmography ==
Year	Title	Role	Notes	Ref.
2021	Thinkalazhcha Nishchayam	Suja	Won SIIMA awards for best debutant actress	
2022	Vaashi	Anusha		
2022	Aanandam Paramanandam	Anupama		
2023	Dear Vaappi	Amira		
2024	Raastha	Shahana		
2024	Turkish Tharkkam			
2025	Anpodu Kanmani	Shalini		

== Awards and nominations ==
Year	Award	Category	Film	Result	Ref.
2022	SIIMA Awards	Best Debutant Actress (Malayalam)	Thinkalazhcha Nishchayam	Won	
2022	Filmfare Awards South	Best Debutant Actress (Malayalam)	Thinkalazhcha Nishchayam	Won	
2022	Critics' Choice Film Awards, India	Best Supporting Actress	Thinkalazhcha Nishchayam	Nominated	
