= Labruna =

Labruna is an Italian surname. Notable people with the surname include:

- Ángel Labruna (1918–1983), Argentine footballer
- Omar Labruna (born 1957), Argentine football coach and former player

== See also ==
- AS Labruna, Italian engine manufacturer company
