= Karthik Saragur =

Indian film director and screenwriter

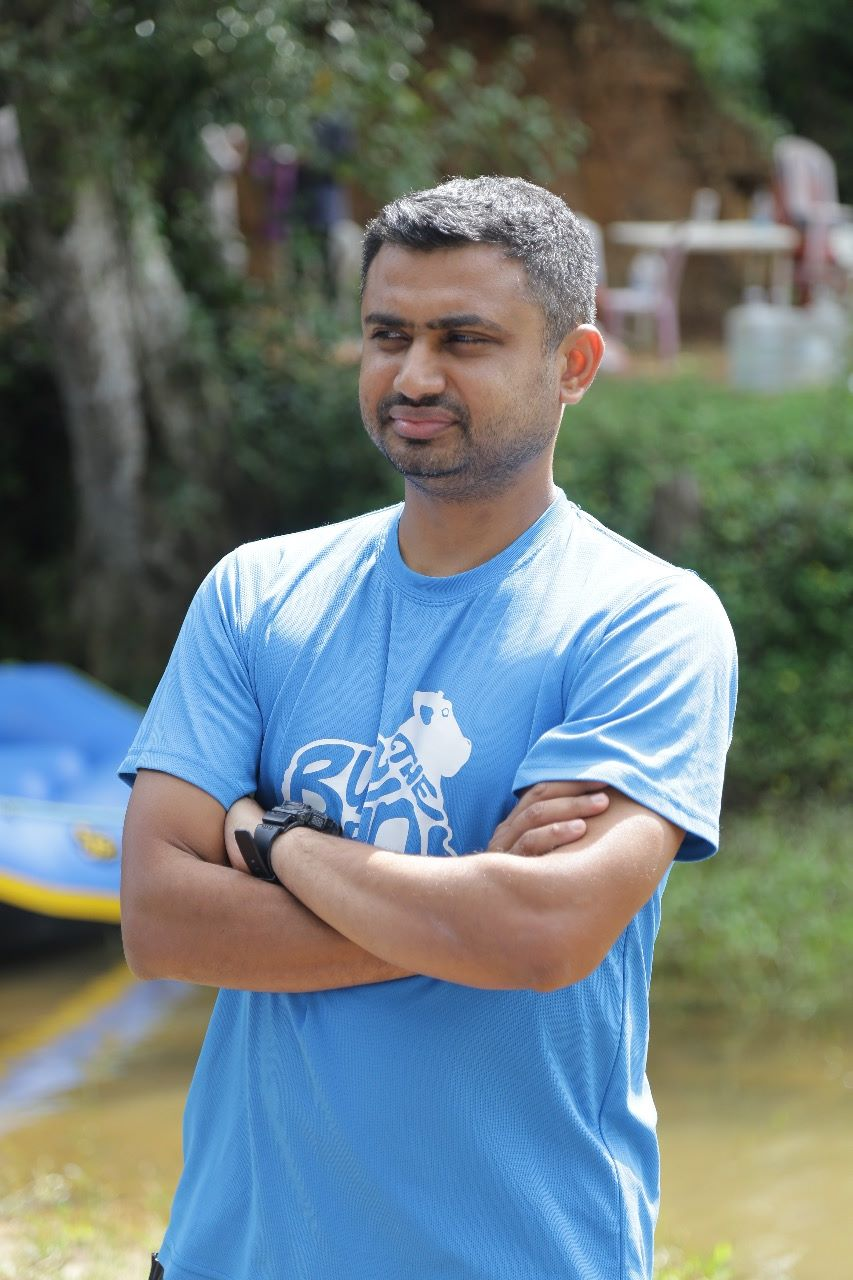
- Saragur during the filming of Bheemasena Nalamaharaja
- Born: Mysore, Karnataka, India
- Education: Sri Ramakrishna Vidyashala, Mysore
- Occupations: Film director, screenwriter, lyricist, costume designer

Karthik Saragur (Kannada: ಕಾರ್ತಿಕ್ ಸರಗೂರ್) is an Indian film director, screenwriter and lyricist who works primarily in Kannada cinema.

== Early life ==
Karthik hails from Saragur, a small town in the Mysore district of Karnataka. He studied in Sri Ramakrishna Vidyashala, a residential school in Mysore, where he received the Gold medal for being the best outgoing student in his school.

== Career ==
Karthik Saragur began his career by making docudramas like Vivekananda by Vivekananda. He received critical acclaim for "Bengaluru: idu namma ooru", a hugely popular 90 part documentary series about the history of Bangalore and its various neighbourhoods presented by Suresh Moona. In 2007, his work for Nagesh Kukunoor's Bollywood film Dor earned him the Best Costume Design award nomination at the 52nd Filmfare Awards.

Saragur's debut directorial Jeerjimbe elicited rave reviews on its release. The Indian Express hailed Jeerjimbe as one “those films which makes us believe in our dreams. And it does so effortlessly, given the complexities of human emotions during such a journey”. Times of India likened Saragur's work “to the cinema one experiences from Iran or Italy, where the narrative is subtle and realistic". This film won four Karnataka State Film Awards, the most for any film in 2016. Film Companion included Jeerjimbe in one of Kannada cinema's five hidden gems from 2018.

Saragur's Bheema Sena Nala Maharaja was released online as part of Amazon Primevideo's Great Indian Festival. The film is produced by Pushkara Mallikarjunaiah, Rakshit Shetty, and Hemanth M. Rao. This is the second collaboration of Karthik Saragur and Pushkara Mallikarjunaiah after Jeerjimbe.

Saragur was hired to write the Kannada dialogues and song lyrics for Nitesh Tiwari's mythological epic Ramayana: Part 1, co-produced by Yash. As part of the project's music composed by A. R. Rahman, he penned the Kannada lyrics for tracks including the devotional single "Jai Jai Rama".

== Filmography ==
Year	Film					
Year	Film	Director	Screenplay	Producer	Lyricist	Singer
2017	Jeerjimbe	Yes	Yes	Yes	Yes	Yes
2020	Bheema Sena Nala Maharaja	Yes	Yes	No	Yes	Yes
2020	Varna Patala	No	Yes	No	Yes	No
2021	3Devi	No	No	No	Yes	No
2026	Indu enage govinda	Yes	Yes	No	Yes	No
2026	Ramayana: Part 1	No	No	No	Yes	No

== Awards and nominations ==
Movie	Award	Category	Result	Ref.
Dor	52nd Filmfare Awards	Best Costume Design	Nominated	
Jeerjimbe	Karnataka State Film Awards	Best Children's Film	Won	
Jeerjimbe	Karnataka State Film Awards	Best Lyrics	Won	
Jeerjimbe	Raghavendra Chitravaani Award	Best Debut Director	Won	
Jeerjimbe	66th Filmfare Awards South 2019	Best Director- Kannada	Nominated	
