= Padmini (2023 film) =

2023 Malayalam film by Senna Hegde

- Theatrical release poster
- Directed by: Senna Hegde
- Written by: Deepu Pradeep
- Produced by: Suvin K Varkey; Prasobh Krishna
- Starring: Kunchacko Boban; Aparna Balamurali; Madonna Sebastian; Vincy Aloshious
- Cinematography: Sreeraj Raveendran
- Edited by: Manu Antony
- Music by: Jakes Bejoy
- Production company: Little Big Films
- Distributed by: Central Pictures
- Release date: 14 July 2023
- Running time: 120 minutes
- Country: India
- Language: Malayalam

Padmini is a 2023 Indian Malayalam-language comedy drama film directed by Senna Hegde and written by Deepu Pradeep. It stars Kunchacko Boban, Aparna Balamurali, Madonna Sebastian, and Vincy Aloshious in the lead roles. The film follows Rameshan's life, which turns into a crisis following an unexpected incident on the wedding night.

The film was officially announced in November 2021. Principal photography began in January 2023 in Palakkad and was wrapped up in February 2023. The music was composed by Jakes Bejoy. The cinematography and editing were handled by Sreeraj Raveendran and Manu Antony.

Padmini was theatrically released on 14 July 2023 to mixed reviews and became a box office bomb.

== Plot ==
Rameshan, a college lecturer and part-time poet, marries Smrithi at 34. On the night of the wedding, Smrithi elopes with her boyfriend Siju in a Premier Padmini, with Rameshan's knowledge. Two people who witnessed the elopement spread the news in the village. People started calling Rameshan 'Padmini' as his bride eloped in a Premier Padmini car.

Venu, Rameshan's friend, suggests that he should consider remarrying. Rameshan and Venu visit a marriage bureau in Kollengode. The bureau manager, Thanku, shows Rameshan profiles of several girls. After selecting a few to visit, Rameshan and Venu arrive at Advocate Sreedevi's home to see her as a prospective bride. Before entering the house, Ramesh spots a Premier Padmini on Sreedevi's porch and decides to not meet Sreedevi. Rameshan then decides that he will no longer live a married life. Sreedevi is furious that Ramesh doesn't want to see her. On the work front, a lady called Padmini joins as a mathematics guest lecturer at Rameshan's college. Ramesh and Padmini grow close. Jayan, the owner of the Raareeram mattress company, approaches Sreedevi with a marriage proposal. Sreedevi initially rejects the proposal but gradually warms up to him and accepts his marriage proposal. Meanwhile, Rameshan and Padmini decide to get married. Rameshan arrives at Padmini's house with a marriage proposal with his family. When Padmini's uncle asks if Rameshan has legally divorced Smrithi, Rameshan realizes this thought has totally skipped his mind.

Padmini meets with Sreedevi to discuss Rameshan's situation. Sreedevi asks Padmini to send Rameshan to her office. Rameshan and Venu visit Sreedevi. When Sreedevi mentions that she wants Smrithi's signature on the affidavit, Venu responds that they don't know anything about Smrithi's whereabouts. Rameshan and Venu visit Smrithi's home to inquire about her, but they get ridiculed by Smrithi's father for letting her elope with her boyfriend. Ramesh and his younger brother Rahul search for Smrithi's details on social media but find nothing. Rameshan goes to Smrithi's village with Rahul to inquire about her, but there is no result. At Sreedevi's request, Rameshan brings a photo of Smrithi to his next visit. Jayan arrives unexpectedly at the office and sees Rameshan, whom he met at the marriage bureau.

Padmini informs Rameshan that her family is seeking a new marriage proposal for her. Rameshan appears in court for divorce, but the judge also orders Smrithi to attend and adjourn the case. Jayan asks Sreedevi to withdraw from Rameshan's case and criticizes her inability to win a case. Sreedevi takes Rameshan's case as a challenge to Jayan's criticism. Sreedevi and Rameshan visit Smrithi's home, but Smrithi's father again mocks them. Smrithi's younger sister meets them and tells them that Smriti is in Chennai. On their way home, Jayan sees Sreedevi and Rameshan riding together on a scooter and gets jealous.

Rameshan and Sreedevi travel to Chennai to meet Smriti. When Sreedevi doesn't answer his calls, Jayan goes to Ramesh's college to meet Padmini. Padmini informs Jayan that Rameshan and Sreedevi went to Chennai together, which upsets him further. Smrithi, who had difficulty staying with Siju, decides to go with Rameshan and Sreedevi after meeting them. When Jayan arrives in Chennai, he finds Sreedevi and Rameshan talking in a hotel room. Jayan then ends his relationship with Sreedevi.

Rameshan and Sreedevi take Smrithi to Padmini's hostel in Kavasseri. There, Padmini and Smrithi engage in a brief conflict over Rameshan, and Sreedevi takes Smrithi to her house. The next day, Rameshan, Padmini, Padmini's father, and Padmini's uncle appear in court. However, because of Smrithi's absence, the case is postponed again. Tired of the delay in the legal proceedings, Padmini's uncle asks Rameshan to end it with her.

A few days later, Siju marries Monisha. Smrithi, aware of Siju's marriage, visits Monisha's home with Rameshan and Sreedevi and informs Monisha's family about her relationship with Siju. Monisha makes a scene and tells her father she wants to marry her boyfriend, Kishore. Smriti, who had left Siju to make him jealous, gets him back after his bride rejects him for her boyfriend on their wedding night. After solving the issue, Rameshan and Sreedevi leave the wedding venue in Sreedevi's Premier Padmini.

== Cast ==
- Kunchacko Boban as Rameshan aka Padmini (Nickname), a college lecturer teaching Malayalam and part-time poet who struggles to get a divorce and find a new wife.
- Aparna Balamurali as Sreedevi, an advocate who befriends Rameshan and helps him to get a divorce.
- Madonna Sebastian as Padmini, a guest lecturer teaching math at the same college where Rameshan worked, fell in love with him.
- Vincy Aloshious as Smriti, Rameshan's wife who eloped with Siju
- Malavika Menon as Laya, Rahul's lover (guest appearance)
- Anaswara Rajan as Monisha, Siju's Fiance (guest appearance)
- Althaf Salim as Siju, Smriti's lover
- Sajin Cherukayil as Jayan, owner of a mattress company, who approaches Sridevi with a marriage proposal
- Ganapathi S. Poduval as Rahul, Rameshan's younger brother
- Anand Manmadhan as Venu, Rameshan's friend
- Seema G. Nair as Santha Devi, Rameshan's mother
- Gokulan as Rafi, Rameshan's colleague
- James Elia as Keshavan, Smriti's father
- Srikant Murali as Padmini's uncle, a village officer
- Neeraja Rajendran as Sreedevi's mother
- Unniraj Cheruvathur as Judge
- Jayakumar Parameswaran Pillai as Principal
- Mani Shornur as Narayanan
- Jordi Poonjar as Thanku
- Arunkumar Pavumba as Kannan Aavani
- Jimmy Danny as Amminikuttan
- Mahesh as Ratheesh
- Amrita Krishnakumar as Sherin
- Mahesh Kumar as Abu
- Vinu Vimal as Bhasi
- Jaison as Uthaman
- Shinu Shyamalan as Nandini
- Ambili as Jaya
- Mani as Shankunni
- Sreelekha Nambiar as Leela
- Vipin Kavvayi as Aji
- Vinayan as Akbar
- Jithin as Sudhi
- Zhinz Shan as Monisha's father
- Ramadevi as Lalitha
- Mathews Pavaratty as Sudhakaran
- Aradhya Sai as Smrithi's sister
- Kala as Smrithi's mother
- Letha Das as Monisha's mother
- Doctor Siju as Padmini's father
- Trini Anto as Sreeni

== Production ==
=== Development ===
The film was announced in November 2021 by director Senna Hegde.

=== Filming ===
The principal photography of the film began on 10 January 2023 in Palakkad. The shooting was wrapped in February 2023.

== Music ==
Padmini

Soundtrack album by Jakes Bejoy,
- Released: 2023
- Recorded: 2023
- Genre: Feature film soundtrack
- Language: Malayalam
- Label: Saregama
- Producer: Jakes Bejoy

Jakes Bejoy, chronology
Por Thozhil (2023)	Padmini (2023)	King of Kotha (2023)

Song	Singer	Lyricist
"Padminiye"	Sachin Warrier	Titto P Thankachen
"Love You Muthe"	Vidyadharan Master; Kunchacko Boban	Manu Manjith
"Nenjil Oru"	Libin Scaria; Aswin Vijayan	Titto P Thankachen
"Aalmara Kakka (The Poetic Theppu)"	Akhil J Chand; Kunchacko Boban (Poetic Rap)	Manu Manjith

== Release ==
=== Theatrical ===
The film was released on 14 July 2023 across theatres in Kerala to mixed reviews.

=== Home media ===
Netflix acquired the film's digital rights and began streaming it on 11 August 2023.

== Reception ==
=== Critical reception ===
S. R. Praveen of The Hindu wrote "Despite the quirkiness quotient, the film proceeds tamely compared to Senna Hegde's previous two outings and without any surprises for the most part." Anandu Suresh of The Indian Express gave the film 3 out of 5 stars and wrote "While Padmini had the potential to be a soothing and feel-good romantic comedy, the film, which started off strongly, unfortunately, descends into a disappointingly convenient ending, preventing it from reaching its full potential and soaring to greater heights." Princy Alexander of Onmanorama stated "Padmini too appears as an ordinary feel-good movie, set in a village with the protagonist Rameshan hoping to settle down with a girl who understands him."

Sanjith Sidhardhan of OTTPlay gave 3.5/5 stars and said "Boosted by Kunchacko Boban, Aparna Balamurali, Madonna Sebastian and Sajin Cherukayil's performances, Senna Hegde's Padmini is a definitely one of the best feel-good movies in Malayalam this year, in spite of its terse ending." Sajin Shrijith of Cinema Express gave 3.5/5 stars and wrote "Padmini has a remarkable quality that some recent Malayalam comedies don't have: the ability to make even the lines spoken by a one-minute character memorable." Cris of The News Minute stated "Padmini, which has Aparna Balamurali, Madonna Sebastian, and Vincy Aloshious opposite Kunchacko Boban, manages to find a new path – original and a wee bit hilarious, but not entirely engaging." Gopika ls of The Times of India gave 3/5 stars and wrote "It touches on a lot of subjects and impress them on viewers successfully, including how trauma occurs, how people handle it and also, toxicity of the society- all in a light hearted manner."
