= Aanandam Paramanandam =

Anandam Paramanandam
- Release poster
- Directed by: Shafi
- Written by: M. Sindhu Raj
- Starring: Sharafudheen; Aju Varghese; Indrans; Baiju Santhosh
- Cinematography: Manoj Pillai
- Edited by: V Sajan
- Music by: Shaan Rahman
- Production company: Saptha Tharang Creations Private Limited
- Release date: 23 December 2022
- Country: India
- Language: Malayalam
- Box office

Aanandam Paramanandam (transl. Joy Bliss) is a 2022 Indian Malayalam-language comedy-drama film directed by Shafi and produced by Saptha Tharang Creations Private Limited. The film stars Sharafudheen, Aju Varghese, Indrans, and Baiju Santhosh. The film's story, screenplay, and dialogues are written by M. Sindhuraj. The film's music is composed by Shaan Rahman and the cinematography is handled by Manoj Pillai. it was final film of Shafi as director before his death.

== Cast ==
- Sharafudheen as Gireesh
- Indrans as Divakara Kurup
- Aju Varghese as Gopi
- Anagha Narayanan as Anupama
- Vanitha Krishnachandran as Vimala Teacher
- Baiju Santhosh as Sudhan
- Sadiq as Security
- Harikrishnan as Harikrishnan
- Nisha Sarang as Gireesh's mother
- Surjith Gopinath
- Sinoj Varghese as Joy

== Production ==
The first look poster of the film was released by Mammootty in September 2022

== Reception ==
A critic of ManoramaOnline wrote that "indhuraj and Shafie have come up with a very different narrative style this time, although many film." Aparna Prasanthi critic of Indian Express wrote that "Anand Bliss may entertain audiences who like movies that teach the audience lessons of goodness that convey messages". A critic of Mathrubhumi gave mixed review.
