= Jeerjimbe =

2018 Indian Kannada-language film

- Directed by: Karthik Saragur
- Written by: Karthik Saragur
- Starring: Siri Vanalli; Lavanya; Suman Nagarkar
- Cinematography: Balaji Manohar
- Edited by: Pradeep Nayak
- Music by: Charan Raj
- Production companies: Pushkar Films; Beehive Productions
- Release dates: October 2017 (Cutting Edge Film Festival); November 16, 2018
- Country: India
- Language: Kannada

Jeerjimbe is a 2017 Indian Kannada-language film directed by Karthik Saragur and produced by Beehive Productions in collaboration with Pushkara Mallikarjunaiah. The music was composed by Charan Raj.

The film featured in as many as 23 international film festivals before its theatrical release in November 2018.Film Companion included Jeerjimbe in one of Kannada cinema's five hidden gems from 2018.

== Plot ==
Jeerjimbe follows the trail of a schoolgirl Rudri - carefree as a butterfly, whose single-minded wish in life is to ride a bicycle of her own. Till she discovers life, and the complexities and struggles that beleaguer a teenager in rural India, that is. Astride her government-issued bicycle, Rudri persists past the ups and downs facing her, and asserts her selfhood, identity and agency in face of child marriage and other societal constraints.

== Cast ==
- Siri Vanalli as Rudri aka Ruddramma
- Lavanya
- Suman Nagarkar

== Production ==
In an interview with The Times of India, the director said, "Jeerjimbe is a story of adventures of a 13-year-old girl from a remote village in Karnataka. The story is based on the emotional struggles of a girl when a bicycle enters her life as part of the free cycles programmes provided by the government to all high-school children in rural areas". The film was made through a crowd funding campaign and was later backed by producer Pushkara Mallikarjunaiah.

== Reception ==
The theatre release of Jeerjimbe elicited rave reviews. The Indian Express hailed Jeerjimbe as a film that "makes us believe in our dreams. And it does so effortlessly, given the complexities of human emotions during such a journey". The popular film portal "Film Companion" called Jeerjimbe a "deeply empowering social drama". Times of India likened the film "to the cinema one experiences from Iran or Italy, where the narrative is subtle and realistic". The Bangalore Mirror emphasized that Jeerjimbe is a film "that children can enjoy, grownups can empathise with and a discernible mind would appreciate".

== Accolades ==
2016 Karnataka State Film Awards

This film won four Karnataka State Film Awards, the most for any film in 2016.

- Best Children's Film
- Best Lyricist – Karthik Saragur
- Best Music – Charan Raj
- Best Child Actor – Siri Vanalli
