= Godhi Banna Sadharana Mykattu =

2016 film by Hemanth Rao

- Theatrical release poster
- Directed by: Hemanth M. Rao
- Written by: Hemanth M. Rao
- Produced by: Pushkara Mallikarjunaiah
- Starring: Anant Nag; Rakshit Shetty; Vasishta N. Simha; Sruthi Hariharan
- Cinematography: Nandakishore Neelakanta Rao
- Edited by: Srikanth Shroff
- Music by: Charan Raj
- Production companies: Pushkar Films; Lost & Found Films
- Release date: 3 June 2016
- Running time: 144 minutes
- Country: India
- Language: Kannada
- Budget: ₹2.4 crore
- Box office: ₹12—15 crore

Godhi Banna Sadharana Mykattu (transl. Wheatish Complexion Moderately Built) is a 2016 Indian Kannada drama film written and directed by Hemanth Rao, making his debut, and produced by Pushkara Mallikarjun under Pushkar Films. The film stars Anant Nag and Rakshit Shetty in the lead roles with Achyuth Kumar, Sruthi Hariharan, Vasishta N. Simha and Ravikiran portraying supporting roles. The movie was a commercial success at the box office.

The film revolves around Venkob Rao, a middle-aged man who has Alzheimer's disease, going missing. His son Shiva who is worried by his father's disappearance embarks on a search with a female doctor. Venkob becomes entangled with a killer. The rest of the film involves whether Shiva finds his father or not.

The film's score and soundtrack were composed by Charan Raj. The film's cinematography and editing was handled by Nanda Kishore and Srikanth Shroff, respectively. The film had a worldwide release on June 3, 2016. Upon release, the film received positive critical response and became successful at the box-office. The film was remade in Tamil in 2018 as 60 Vayadu Maaniram.

== Plot ==
Venkob Rao has Alzheimer's and has been admitted to an old age home by his career-driven son Shiva. Now settled in Mumbai, Shiva has come down to Bengaluru for a business meeting, the outcome of which could fulfill his long-standing dream of moving to the United States. Venkob Rao goes missing when Shiva takes him out shopping.

Meanwhile, a local civil servant is murdered while uncovering a land scam and Ranga is entrusted with making the murder seem like an accident. With Venkob Rao going missing, Shiva is forced to confront the decisions he has made in the past when his dream of going abroad is all but realized.

He begins looking for Venkob Rao reluctantly with the help of doctor Sahana from the old age home. Along this long journey, Shiva starts discovering little facets of his father's personality while forging a friendship with doctor Sahana. A clueless Venkob Rao ends up crossing paths with Ranga and his annoying young assistant Manja who are in the process of disposing the body of the civil servant. Kumar, a good Samaritan returning home, becomes entangled with Ranga, Manja and Venkob Rao. Shiva's search for Venkob Rao allows him to find all that's missing in his life while Ranga in Venkob Rao's presence finds something that he had lost years ago.

Ranga, Manja and Venkob stay in Kumar's home. Ranga threatens the family with death if they expose the truth about the murder to the police. To cover up the murder, however, Ranga's boss orders Ranga to kill Kumar, his family and Manja, which Ranga reluctantly accepts. However, he doesn't proceed with the murder and lies that he has to his boss. Manja is in love with a dancer Reshma who happens to be a cohort of Ranga's boss. Manja inadvertently reveals that Ranga has not carried out the murder by telling Reshma this. When Ranga's boss discovers that he has not committed the murder, he sends a policeman to murder Ranga, but in the ensuing fight, they both die. Saddened by Ranga's death, Manja retaliates by killing his boss and Reshma.

After this, Kumar who sees the missing poster of Venkob Rao calls Shiva and informs him about the whereabouts of his father. Shiva emotionally reunites with his father and also marries Sahana.

== Cast ==
- Anant Nag as Venkob Rao
- Rakshit Shetty as Shiva V. Rao
- Achyuth Kumar as Kumar
- Sruthi Hariharan as Dr. Sahana
- Vasishta N. Simha as Ranga
- Ravikiran Rajendran as Manja
- Sanchari Vijay in a cameo appearance
- Parameshwar(Kalamadyama) as Inspector
- Patre Nagaraj
- Devendra
- Kartikeya

== Production ==
Having announced of making the film in 2014, Hemanth Rao, who made his debut as a director with the film, began filming 11 January 2015. The first schedule of the shooting took place predominantly in Bengaluru featuring lead actors Anant Nag and Rakshit Shetty. With Sruthi Hariharan, Achyuth Kumar and joining Vasishta N. Simha, the next schedule began on 19 January. Vasishta was initially in talks to play the character that Rakshit Shetty played in the film. Rao revealed that Nag plays the role of Venkob Rao, a regular office-goer in Bengaluru in the 1970s, who after having worked at the same company for over 40 years, goes missing. It was revealed in September 2015 that Nag would be portraying an Alzheimer's patient. Talking about what inspired him to choose such a subject, he said, "As a kid, I used to watch the missing reports on television news. The following day, I used to wonder what happened to those who had gone missing the previous day - were they found? When I started meeting people who have had people go missing in their family, I realized that, for the family, the lack of closure about the person who has gone away is the most important aspect. While this was one thread of the story, the other important element is the relationship between a father and a son, something that I have always been fascinated with."

== Soundtrack ==
Godhi Banna Sadharana Mykattu

Soundtrack album by Charan Raj
- Released: 16 March 2016
- Recorded: 2015–2016
- Genre: Feature film soundtrack
- Length: 33:16
- Language: Kannada
- Label: Pushkar Films

Charan Raj chronology
Mandya to Mumbai (2015)	Godhi Banna Sadharana Mykattu (2016)	Pushpaka Vimana (2016)

Charan Raj scored the film's music and for its soundtrack. The soundtrack album consists of nine tracks. The album was released on digital platforms such as Hungama, iTunes and Wynk Music on 16 March 2016, on a revenue-sharing basis.

No.	Title	Lyrics	Artist(s)	Length
1.	"Naa Ee Sanjege"	Rakshit Shetty	Siddhanth, Sharanya	4:04
2.	"Komala Henne"	Dhananjay Ranjan	Job Kurian K.	4:04
3.	"Ranga Bhoomiya"	Kiran Kaverappa	Haricharan	3:33
4.	"Katheyondu Shuruvaagide"	Sharath	Arun Kamath, Sparsha R. K.	3:46
5.	"Ayomaya"	Dhananjay Ranjan	Siddhanth, Inchara Rao	3:25
6.	"Ale Moodide"	Sudarshan D. C.	Sooraj Santhosh	3:53
7.	"Gaasi Gumma"	Dhananjay Ranjan	Charan Raj, Ananya Suresh	3:36
8.	"Mouna"	Dhananjay Ranjan	Deepak Doddera	3:09
Total length:				33:16

== Remake ==
Prakash Raj has purchased the rights to remake the movie in Tamil, Telugu and Hindi. The film has been remade in Tamil as 60 Vayadu Maaniram (2018) with Prakash Raj.

== Awards ==
Award	Date of ceremony	Category	Recipient	Result	Ref(s)
Filmfare Awards South	17 June 2017	Best Film	Pushkar Films; Lost & Found Films	Nominated	
Filmfare Awards South	17 June 2017	Best Direction	Hemanth M. Rao	Nominated	
Filmfare Awards South	17 June 2017	Best Actor	Anant Nag	Won	
Filmfare Awards South	17 June 2017	Best Actress	Sruthi Hariharan	Nominated	
Filmfare Awards South	17 June 2017	Best Actor in a Supporting Role	Vasishta N. Simha	Won	
Filmfare Awards South	17 June 2017	Best Music Director	Charan Raj	Nominated	
Filmfare Awards South	17 June 2017	Best Actress (critics)	Sruthi Hariharan	Won	
IIFA Utsavam	28—29 March 2017	Best Picture	Pushkar Mallikarjun	Nominated	
IIFA Utsavam	28—29 March 2017	Best Direction	Hemanth Rao	Nominated	
IIFA Utsavam	28—29 March 2017	Best Actor	Anant Nag	Nominated	
IIFA Utsavam	28—29 March 2017	Best Supporting Actor	Rakshit Shetty	Won	
IIFA Utsavam	28—29 March 2017	Best Actor in Comic Role	Achyuth Kumar	Nominated	
IIFA Utsavam	28—29 March 2017	Best Actor in Negative Role	Vasishta Simha	Won	
IIFA Utsavam	28—29 March 2017	Best Lyrics	Sudarshan D. C. ("Ale Mood Adhe")	Nominated	
IIFA Utsavam	28—29 March 2017	Best Female Playback Singer	Inchara Rao for ("Ayomaya")	Won	
IIFA Utsavam	28—29 March 2017	Best Story	Hemanth Rao	Nominated	
South Indian International Movie Awards	June 30 - July 1, 2017	Best Film	Pushkar Films	Nominated	
South Indian International Movie Awards	June 30 - July 1, 2017	Best Actress	Sruthi Hariharan	Nominated	
South Indian International Movie Awards	June 30 - July 1, 2017	Best Actor in Negative Role	Vasishta Simha	Won	
South Indian International Movie Awards	June 30 - July 1, 2017	Best Debut Director	Hemanth Rao	Won	
South Indian International Movie Awards	June 30 - July 1, 2017	Best Music Director	Charan Raj	Nominated	
South Indian International Movie Awards	June 30 - July 1, 2017	Best Lyrics	Sudarshan D. C. ("Ale Mood Adhe")	Nominated	
South Indian International Movie Awards	June 30 - July 1, 2017	Best Female Playback Singer	Inchara Rao for ("Ayomaya")	Nominated	
