= Hemanth M. Rao =

Indian film director and screenwriter

- Born: 4 September 1983 (age 43); Bangalore, Karnataka, India
- Occupation: Filmmaker

Hemanth M. Rao is an Indian film director and screenwriter who works in Kannada cinema. He rose to fame following the success of his directorial debut Godhi Banna Sadharana Mykattu (2016).

== Career ==
After a brief stint in journalism, Rao ventured into the film industry in 2005. He began working as an assistant director to Girish Kasaravalli on Gulabi Talkies (2008). He then worked in a similar capacity with Jacob Varghese on Savari (2009) and Prithvi (2010).

He made his directorial debut in 2016 with Godhi Banna Sadharana Mykattu, a Kannada drama feature about a man searching for his missing father with Alzheimer’s, with a script that he co-wrote. that had Rakshit Shetty and Anant Nag playing the respective roles. The film, produced by Pushkar Films, was a box office success and received critical acclaim upon release.

Under his banner Lost & Found Films, he co-produced Humble Politician Nograj—a political satire comedy inspired by The Campaign. The film was produced by Pushkar Films and Paramvah Studios and was released in January 2018.

Rao’s next writing venture was Andhadhun (2018), which was also his first venture into Hindi cinema. He co-wrote the script with Sriram Raghavan, Pooja Ladha Surti (who was also the editor of the film), Arijit Biswas, and Yogesh Chandekarand. The film also garnered tremendous praise and popularity, while also quickly garnering a cult following. They all collectively won a Filmfare Award and National Film Award for their screenplay.

His second directorial was Kavaludaari (2019), which was also the maiden production venture of Puneeth Rajkumar under production house, PRK Productions. Kavaludaari won Best Movie in "Kannada Cinema Competition" at 12th Bengaluru International Film Festival 2020

Rao continued to work in the thriller space with Maestro, which released in 2021. His next directorial, Sapta Sagaradaache Ello, is a romantic drama which he wrote a long time back. Owing to the expansive timeline of the screenplay, it was split into two parts: Side A and Side B. Side A released on 1 September 2023 to critical acclaim from both the critics and audience, alike. Side B was released on 17 November 2023.

== Filmography ==
=== As director and screenwriter ===
Year	Film	Credited as		Note	Ref.
Year	Film	Director	Writer	Note	Ref.
2016	Godhi Banna Sadharana Mykattu	Yes	Yes		
2018	Andhadhun	No	Yes	Hindi Film; National Film Award for Best Screenplay	
2019	Kavaludaari	Yes	Yes		
2023	Sapta Saagaradaache Ello: Side A	Yes	Yes		
2023	Sapta Saagaradaache Ello: Side B	Yes	Yes		
2026	666 Operation Dream Theater †	Yes	Yes	Filming	
TBA	Bhairavana Kone Paata †	Yes	Yes	Delayed	

=== As producer ===
Year	Film	Notes	Ref.
2016	Godhi Banna Sadharana Mykattu	Co-produced with Pushkara Mallikarjunaiah	
2018	Humble Politician Nograj	Co-produced with Pushkara Mallikarjunaiah and Rakshit Shetty	
2020	Bheemasena Nalamaharaja	Released on Amazon Prime Video	
2025	Agnyathavasi	Co-produced with Prachura P. P. and Jayalakshmi	

== Awards and nominations ==
Film	Award	Category	Result	Ref.
Godhi Banna Sadharana Mykattu	64th Filmfare Awards South	Best Film- Kannada	Nominated	
Godhi Banna Sadharana Mykattu	64th Filmfare Awards South	Best Director- Kannada	Nominated	
Godhi Banna Sadharana Mykattu	Raghavendra Chitravani Award 2017	Best Screenplay	Won	
Godhi Banna Sadharana Mykattu	Gollapudi Srinivas Award 2017	First Time Best Director	Won	
Godhi Banna Sadharana Mykattu	6th SIIMA Awards	Best Film	Nominated	
Godhi Banna Sadharana Mykattu	6th SIIMA Awards	Best Debut Director	Won	
Andhadhun	66th National Film Awards	Best Adapted Screenplay (jointly)	Won	
Andhadhun	64th Filmfare Awards	Best Screenplay (jointly)	Won	
Andhadhun	24th Star Screen Awards	Best Screenplay (jointly)	Won	
Andhadhun	20th IIFA Awards	Best Screenplay (jointly)	Won	
Kavaludaari	12th Bengaluru International Film Festival 2020	Best Film in Kannada Cinema	Won	
Kavaludaari	Critics’ Choice Film Awards 2020	Best Director	Nominated	
Kavaludaari	Critics’ Choice Film Awards 2020	Best Writing	Nominated	
Kavaludaari	9th SIIMA Awards	Best Director	Nominated	
Sapta Saagaradaache Ello	69th Filmfare Awards South	Best Director	Won	
