= Katheyondu Shuruvagide =

2018 film directed by Senna Hegde

- Release poster
- Directed by: Senna Hegde
- Written by: Senna Hegde
- Produced by: Vinod Divakar; Senna Hegde; Pushkara Mallikarjunaiah; Rakshit Shetty
- Starring: Diganth; Pooja Devariya
- Cinematography: Sreeraj Raveendran
- Music by: Sachin Warrier
- Release date: 3 August 2018
- Country: India
- Language: Kannada

Katheyondu Shuruvagide (transl. A story has blossomed) is a 2018 Indian Kannada-language romantic drama film written and directed by Senna Hegde and starring Diganth and Pooja Devariya (in her Kannada debut).

== Plot ==
Tarun runs a resort on the coastal part of Karnataka, which has a small staff consisting of receptionist Swarna, attendant Pedro, and cook Kutty.

This beautiful resort is on the verge of closure for lack of guests and because of some fake negative reviews.

The staff prepares for the arrive of a couple, Tanya Mehra and Akash Mehra. Tarun goes to the airport to receive the guests but sees only Tanya. While travelling to the resort, Tarun asks Tanya about her husband, and she says he has died. Tanya tells Tarun to keep it secret.

Pedro has a feelings for receptionist Swarna, but Swarna's marriage is being fixed with a man working in Dubai.

Tarun is being guided by an elderly couple, Shashank Murthy and Radha Murthy. This couple has a special loving bond between them, which causes Tarun and Pedro to think to have a life partner.

Following Tanya's stay in the resort and outdoor activities, Tanya and Tarun come close to each other. Meanwhile, Pedro express his thoughts to Swarna, and she consoles Pedro and disagrees with his statement that a relationship is about more than love.

The next day, Tanya's husband arrives in the resort. Tanya gets angry over him and leaves the resort for her city. Tarun goes to the airport to find her and she hugs him from behind.

== Cast ==
- Diganth as Tarun Manchale
- Pooja Devariya as Tanya Mehra
- Ashwin Rao Pallaki as Pedro
- Shreya Anchan as Swarna
- Babu Hirannaiah as Murthy
- Aruna Balraj as Radha
- Prakash Thuminad as Kutty

== Production ==
=== Development ===
Senna Hegde wrote the script in less than a week. Once Senna got the approval from the producers, Pushkara Mallikarjunaiah and Rakshit Shetty, he started working on casting the actors. Senna preferred Diganth since he wanted an actor who would fit the urban portions of the film. Rakshit Shetty recommend Pooja Devariya for the female lead role. After having a discussion with Senna she began learning Kannada for the fluency. She received the full script, including dialogues, a month and a half prior to filming, allowing her to rehearse her Kannada lines. Her involvement in the film was reported in October 2017. The film was launched in November 2017 at a temple in Banashankari.

=== Filming ===
The film was shot within thirty days, primarily along the Karwar-Udupi highway and in locations such as Kapu beach, Malpe, Padubidri, and Puducherry. The sunrise scene was shot in Kolukkumalai. The film was recorded in sync sound. In February 2018 it was reported that portions involving Diganth were completed and only one song remains to be shot.

== Soundtrack ==
The music was composed by Sachin Warrier.

Track listing
No.	Title	Lyrics	Singer(s)	Length
1.	"Daariya Kaledukondide"	Kiran Kaverappa	Leon D'Souza, Inchara Rao	4:41
2.	"Bhoomi Baana Kaadambari"	Kiran Kaverappa	Sachin Warrier	3:16
3.	"Dheemtha"	Kiran Kaverappa	Deepak Doddera, Sangeetha Ravindranath	2:44
4.	"Good Morning"	Veeresh Shivamurthy, Kavana V Vasishta	Sachin Warrier	3:27
5.	"Aparoopavagiye"	Kiran Kaverappa	Ala B Bala, Sachin Warrier	2:31
Total length:				16:39

== Reception ==
A critic from The Times of India gave the film a rating of four out of five stars and noted that "Those looking at a getaway for three hours in a cinema hall for some laughs, a little tears and a story that is soulful and satisfying, this is definitely recommended". Deccan Herald, on the contrary, gave the film a rating of three out of five stars and stated that "We are offered a Hollywood-ish upgrade of the romantic film, with some bows in the direction of the Hindi film Queen. The romantic bits are, quite frankly, sahasra-yawny despite their being carefully underplayed and adroitly avoiding Nicholas Shakespeare territory." Baradwaj Rangan of Film Companion South wrote "The beats are generic, but the lovely cast and the freshness of the filmmaking, I think, could make Katheyondu Shuruvagide the Pelli Choopulu of Kannada cinema...there’s not one ill-considered frame (the cinematography is by Sreeraj Raveendran), and the aesthetics add to the experience, which holds you in the mood of a folk song hummed around a campfire." A critic from The New Indian Express rated the film four out of fives tars and wrote that "If you want to re-look at human relationships through a different lens, go over to watch this film". A critic from The News Minute wrote that "An emotional rollercoaster, Katheyondu Shuruvaagide is sure to resonate with youngsters and people going through a mid-life crisis".
