= Senna Hegde =

Indian film director and screenwriter

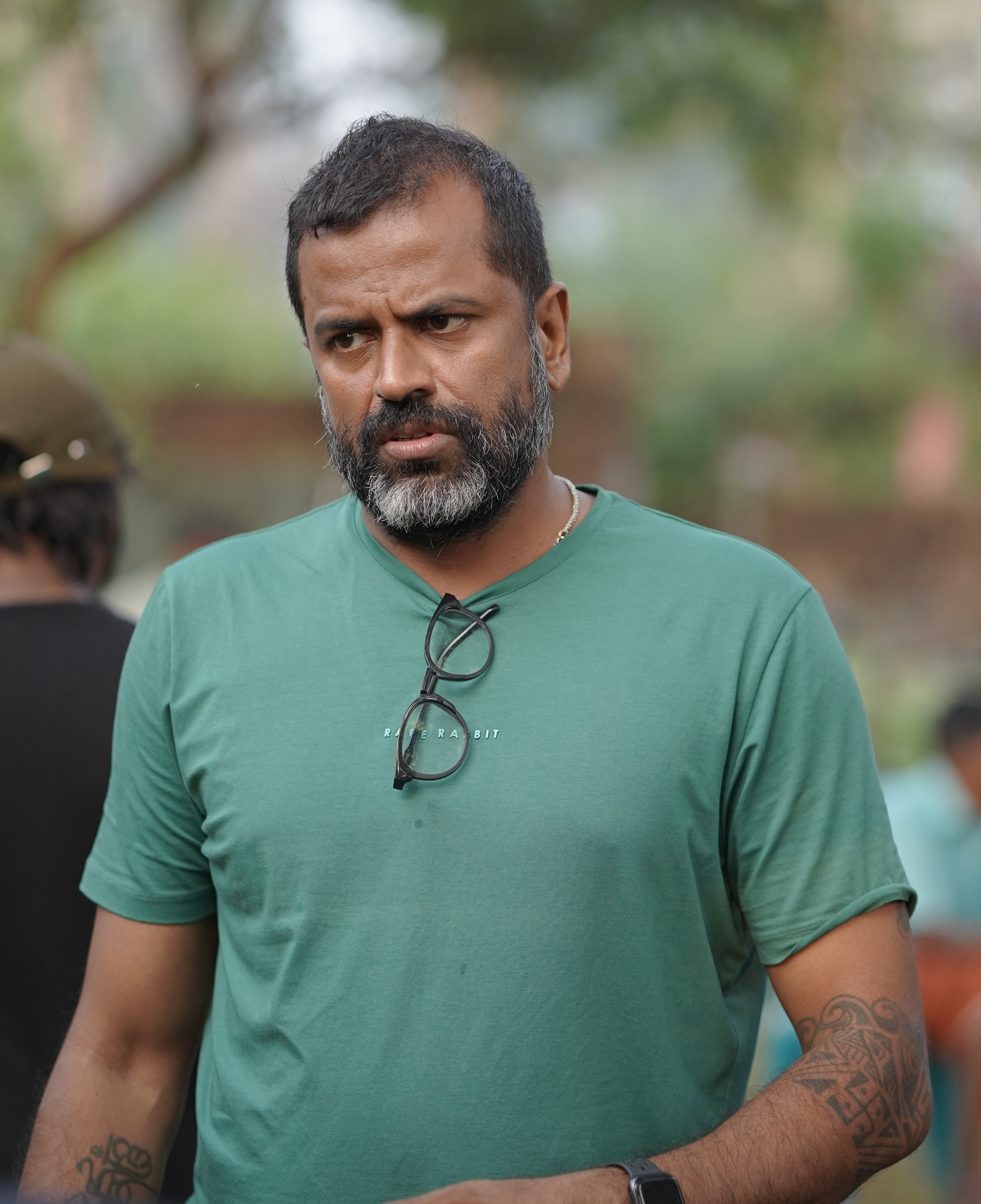
- Born: Kanhangad, Kerala, India
- Occupations: Film director; screenwriter
- Years active: 2016–present
- Notable work: Thinkalazhcha Nishchayam; Katheyondu Shuruvagide; Padmini; 1744 White Alto

Senna Hegde is an Indian film director and screenwriter who mainly works in Malayalam films. He has also direct a film in a Kannada. His debut film was the 2016 docudrama 0-41* and his second film was the romantic comedy, Katheyondu Shuruvagide. His third movie, Malayalam film Thinkalazhcha Nishchayam, won the National Film Award for Best Malayalam Film.

== Biography ==
Senna was born in the town of Kanhangad, Kasaragod, in northern Kerala. He graduated with a master's degree in information technology from Queensland University of Technology, Brisbane, and went on to work as a business analyst in the United States for four years. Then he moved to the Middle East, where for the next eight years he worked for various international advertising agencies. He returned to India in 2014.

Senna worked with Rakshit Shetty's team as a script consultant for his 2014 film Ulidavaru Kandanthe. Back in his hometown, Senna turned his hand to making his own films. He wrote the script for his debut feature film, 0-41*, in three days. A docudrama set in Kanhangad, it follows the lives of players on two rival volleyball teams. With a budget of ₹7 lakh (US$7,300), a crew of four, and a Canon 5D Mark III, he shot the 91-minute film over nine days. The six-member cast were not professional actors, which gave their performance what Anurag Kashyap described as an "innocence". The film made its world premiere at the 11th 'Cinema on the Bayou' film festival in Lafayette, Louisiana on 26 January 2016. It has played at other festivals, but has not been released commercially.

Senna's second film, Katheyondu Shuruvagide is a Kannada-language romantic comedy starring Diganth and Pooja Devariya, with Ashwin Rao Pallaki and Shreya Anchan in supporting roles.

On the occasion of Onam in 2020, he announced his next Malayalam film Thinkalazhcha Nishchayam.

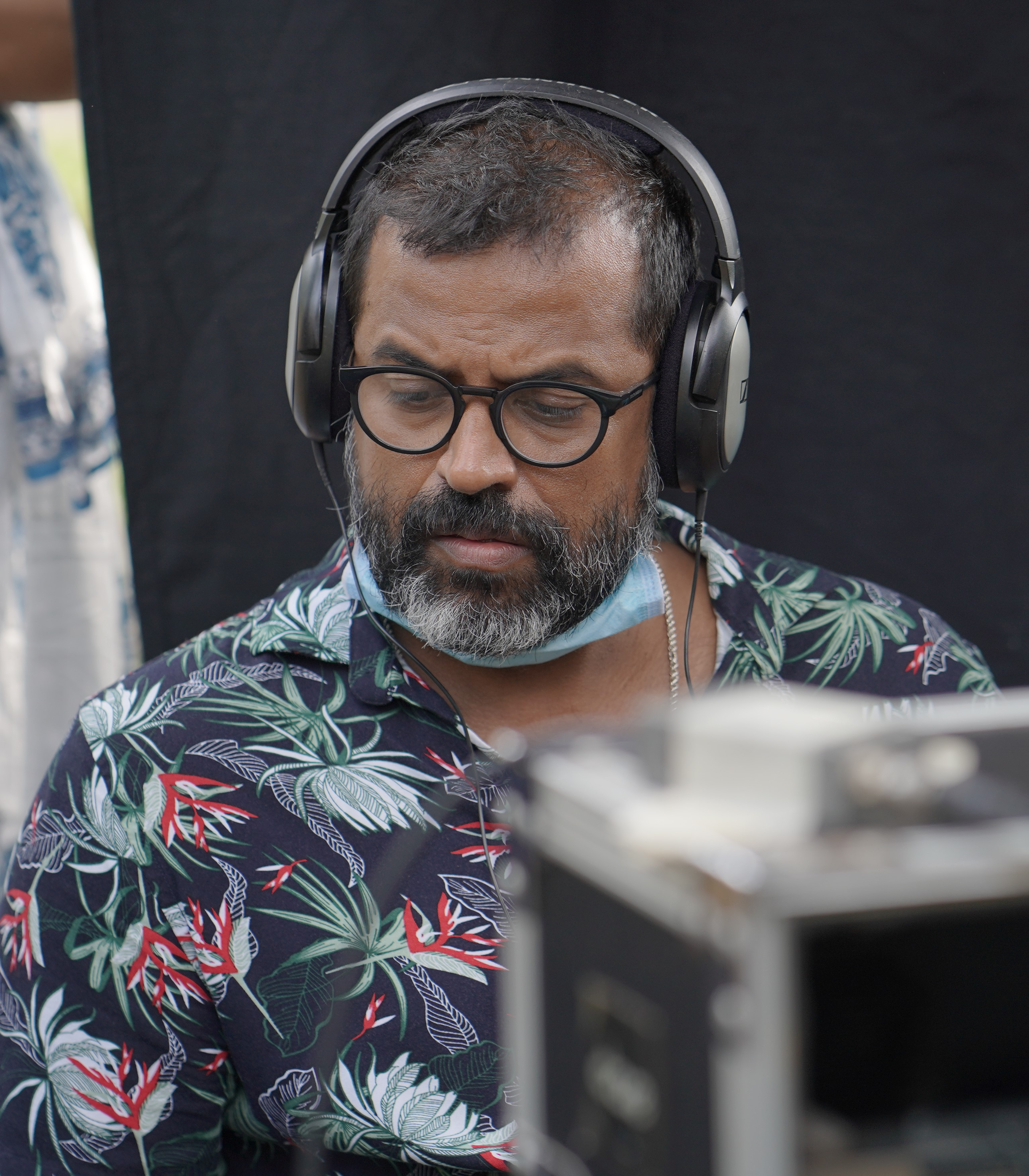

The film won the Kerala State Film Award for Second Best Film and Senna Hegde received the award for Kerala State Film Award for Best Story in the 51st Kerala State Film Awards. The film also won the Best Feature Film in Malayalam in the 68th National Film Awards.

== Filmography ==
Year	Film	Language	Credited as				Ref
Year	Film	Language	Director	Writer	Producer	Actor	Ref
2016	0-41*	Malayalam	Yes	Yes	Yes	No	
2018	Katheyondu Shuruvagide	Kannada	Yes	Yes	Yes	No	
2021	Thinkalazhcha Nishchayam	Malayalam	Yes	Yes	No	No	
2022	1744 White Alto	Malayalam	Yes	Yes	No	No	
2023	Padmini	Malayalam	Yes	No	No	No	
2024	Rifle Club	Malayalam	No	No	No	Yes	
2025	Avihitham	Malayalam	Yes	Yes	Yes	No	

== Awards ==
Film	Award	Category	Status	Ref.
Katheyondu Shuruvagide	8th SIIMA Awards	Best Debut Director	Nominated	
Thinkalazhcha Nishchayam	68th National Film Awards	Best Feature Film in Malayalam	Won	
Thinkalazhcha Nishchayam	51st Kerala State Film Awards	Second Best Film	Won	
Thinkalazhcha Nishchayam	51st Kerala State Film Awards	Best Story	Won	
Thinkalazhcha Nishchayam	67th Filmfare Awards South	Best Director (Malayalam)	Won	
Thinkalazhcha Nishchayam	10th South Indian International Movie Awards	Best Film (Malayalam)	Nominated	
Thinkalazhcha Nishchayam	10th South Indian International Movie Awards	Best Director (Malayalam)	Nominated	
Thinkalazhcha Nishchayam	International Film Festival of Kerala 2020	Malayalam cinema	Selected	
Thinkalazhcha Nishchayam	Mazhavil Entertainment Awards 2022	Best Entertaining Debutant Director	Won	
1744 White Alto	International Film Festival Rotterdam 2023	Harbour	Selected	
Avihitham	New York Indian Film Festival 2026	Narrative Feature	Selected	
Avihitham	New York Indian Film Festival 2026	Best Director	Nominated	
Avihitham	Indian Film Festival of Melbourne 2026	Narrative Feature	Selected	
