= Pooja Devariya =

Indian film and theatre actress

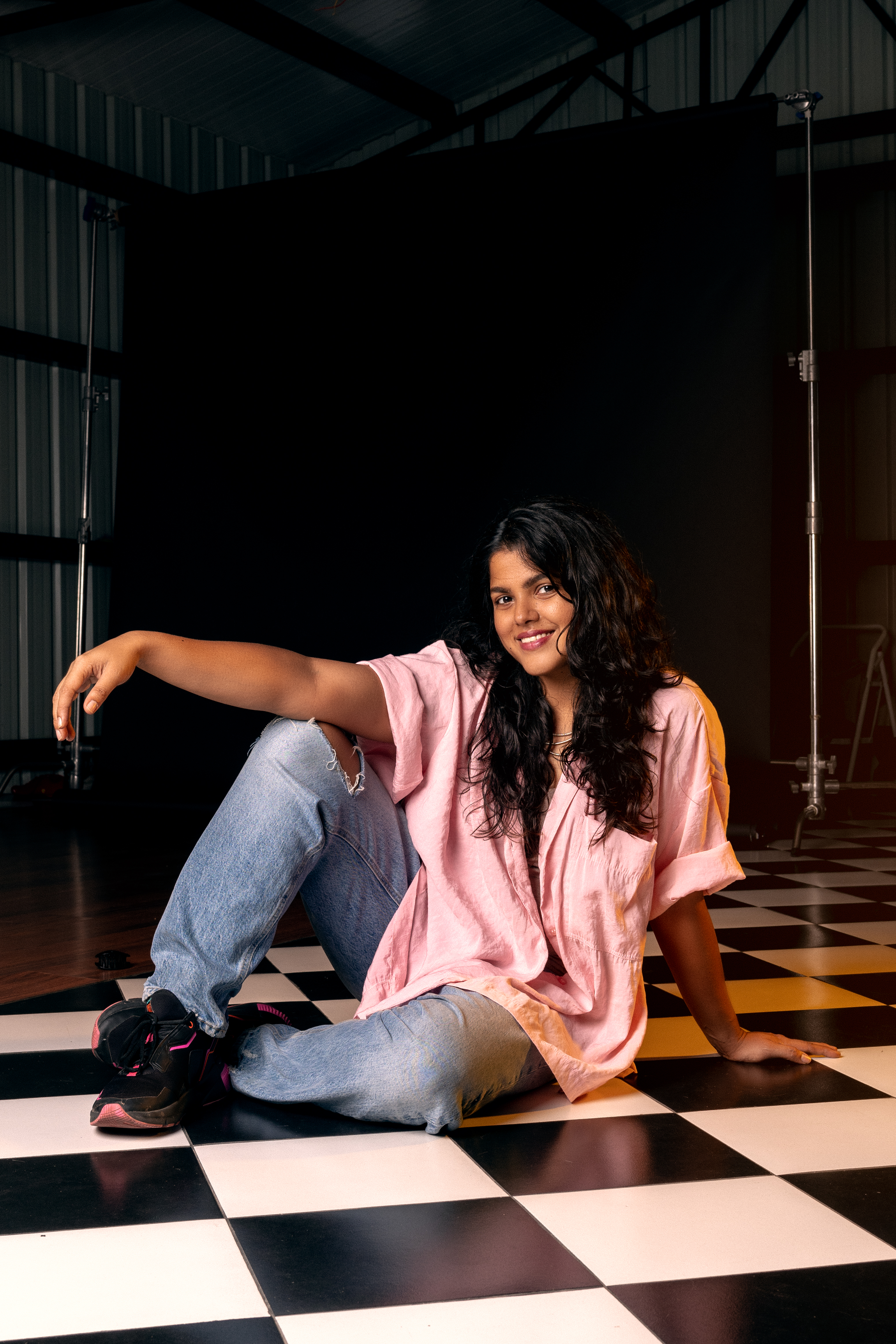
- Born: Chennai, Tamil Nadu
- Occupation: Actor
- Years active: 2011 - present

Pooja Devariya is an Indian film and theatre actress who is known for her works in Tamil and Kannada films. After making her film debut with Selvaraghavan's Mayakkam Enna (2012), she worked extensively in theatre with the Stray Factory, before returning to films in 2015.

== Career ==
Pooja made her acting debut in Selvaraghavan's Mayakkam Enna (2011) portraying Padmini, a friend in Dhanush's gang. Pooja then joined the theatre group Stray Factory and has worked on stage performances and online videos with the company. Notably, she starred as Zorro in an interpretation of The Three Musketeers in December 2012. in 2013, she made her directorial debut was the play Maya from Madurai written by Naren Weiss.

In 2015, she worked on the production of four films, including roles in Karthik Subbaraj's Iraivi and Manikandan's Kuttrame Thandanai. In 2018, Pooja made her Kannada debut with the film Katheyondu Shuruvagide, directed by Senna Hegde. She is half Kannadiga from her mother's side.

Pooja worked with director Bharat Bala as a performance coach on Netflix's anthology, Navarasa. She has worked for Lokesh Kanagaraj's 2022 Kamal Haasan starrer Vikram, in which she was the performance coach for Vijay Sethupathi with particular emphasis on his body language for this role. Her association with Vijay Sethupathi has been a long one and she is his performance coach for both the Sriram Raghavan film Merry Christmas and Kishor Pandurang Belekar's upcoming silent feature Gandhi Talks.

== Filmography ==
- All films are in Tamil, unless otherwise noted.

Year	Film	Role	Notes
2011	Mayakkam Enna	Padmini	
2015	Maiem		
2016	Aandavan Kattalai	Aarthi	
2016	Iraivi	Malar	Won, Edison Award for Best Character Artist Female
2016	Kuttrame Thandanai	Anu	Won, Vikatan Award for Best Supporting Actress; Won, Norway Tamil Film Festival Awards for Best Supporting Actress
2016	Mo	Mo (Mohanavadhani)	
2018	Andhra Mess	Arasi	
2018	Katheyondu Shuruvagide	Tanya Mehra	Kannada film
2019	Vellai Pookal	Ramya	
2019	Ayogya	Santhiya	
2023	Vallavanukkum Vallavan	Aandal	

=== Performance coach ===
Year	Title	Actor
2021	Navarasa	Vijay Sethupathi
2022	Vikram	Vijay Sethupathi
2022	DSP	Vijay Sethupathi
2023	Jawan	Vijay Sethupathi
2024	Merry Christmas	Vijay Sethupathi
2026	Gandhi Talks	Vijay Sethupathi

== Awards and nominations ==
Films

Year	Award	Category	Title	Result
2016	Behindwoods Awards	Best Actress Critics Choice	Iraivi	Won
2016	Edison Awards	Best Supporting Actress	Iraivi	Won
2016	Behindwoods Awards	Best Actress Critics Choice	Kuttrame Thandanai	Won
2016	Vikatan Awards	Best Supporting Actress	Kuttrame Thandanai	Won
2016	Norway Indian Film Festival	Best Supporting Actress	Kuttrame Thandanai	Won
