= Rakshit Shetty =

Indian actor and filmmaker

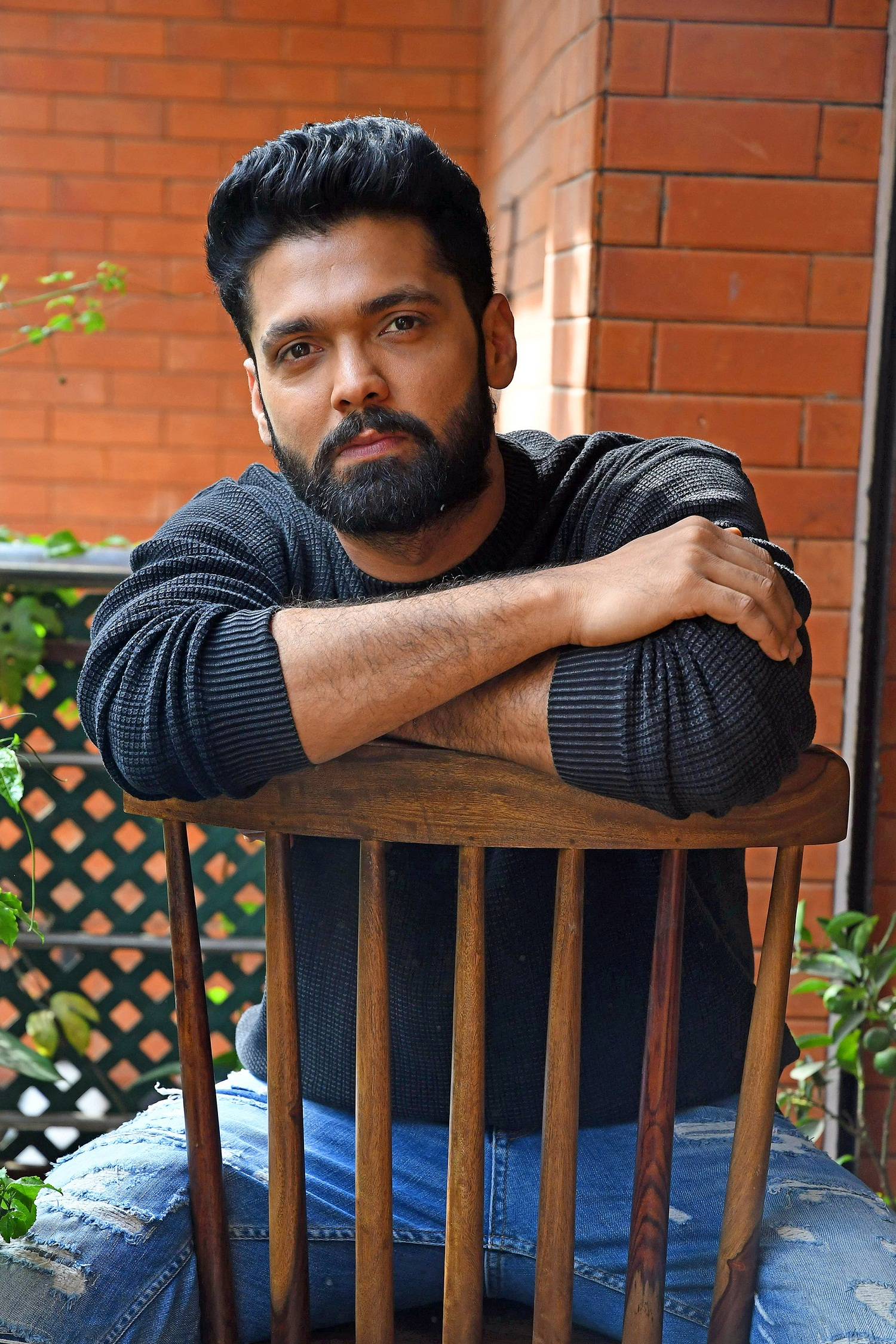
- Born: Rakshit Shetty; 6 June 1983 (age 43); Udupi, Karnataka, India
- Education: NMAM Institute of Technology
- Occupations: Filmmaker; actor; producer
- Years active: 2010–present
- Organization: Paramvah Studios

Rakshit Shetty (born 6 June 1983) is an Indian actor and filmmaker working predominantly in Kannada cinema. He is the recipient of a National Film Award, three Filmfare Awards South, four Karnataka State Film Awards and five SIIMA Awards.

His debut film is Namm Areal Ond Dina (2010) but his breakthrough role was in Simple Agi Ondh Love Story. Shetty is regarded as "Simple Star" for his filmmaking style. He owns the production and distribution company named Paramvah Studios.

He established himself as a leading hero in Godhi Banna Sadharana Mykattu (2015), Kirik Party (2016), Avane Srimannarayana (2019), 777 Charlie (2022), and Sapta Saagaradaache Ello: Side A (2023), and Sapta Saagaradaache Ello: Side B (2023) with 777 Charlie becoming the highest-grossing film of his career.

== Early life ==
Shetty was born in Udupi on 6 June 1983 in a Tulu-speaking Bunt family. He completed schooling at his hometown and was a Pili Nalike dancer and folk dancer in the Tulu Nadu region. This experience made him provide a major role for the dancers in his 2014 film Ulidavaru Kandanthe.

Before starting his film career, Shetty completed a bachelor's degree in Electronics and Communications Engineering at N.M.A.M. Institute of Technology, Nitte, Karkala which is part of Nitte (Deemed to be University). After graduating, he worked as a software professional for two years before pursuing acting and theatre.

== Career ==
=== Debut and breakthrough (2010–2015) ===
Rakshit Shetty made his acting debut as a parallel lead with Nam Areal Ond Dina (2010) directed by Aravind Kaushik. The film starred Anish Tejeshwar and Meghana Gaonkar in lead roles. Though the filming began in 2008, the film underwent several struggles but was released in July 2010 to critical acclaim due to its non-linear narration. Shetty again collaborated with Aravind Kaushik and Meghana Gaonkar in his next release, Tuglak (2012). He played the role of an angry young man—and garnered positive reviews from critics, although the film was criticised for its screenplay and direction.

Shetty's breakthrough role came with the romance-comedy film Simple Agi Ondh Love Story (2013) directed by Simple Suni and co-starred Shwetha Srivatsav. The film turned out to be a box-office and critical success. The film's success resulted in Shetty fondly being called "Simple Star." Following this, Shetty debuted as a director and screenwriter with the neo-noir film Ulidavaru Kandanthe (2014). The film was the first in Kannada to be shot entirely in sync sound technology. Upon release the movie was praised for its regional authenticity in depicting Tulu Nadu and its people. Shetty won the Karnataka State Film Award for Director's First Time Best Film and Filmfare Award for Best Director – Kannada for his direction. The film holds a cult following and has become a part of a new-age generation of Kannada cinema. Following this experience, Shetty performed a cameo role in Suni's directorial Bahuparak with Srinagar Kitty in the lead role.

=== Critical acclaim and continued success (2015–present) ===
Shetty began 2015 by teaming up with the commercial director Yogaraj Bhat for the satirical comedy film Vaastu Prakaara, co-starring Jaggesh. Following this, Shetty appeared in a cameo as himself in the film Jaathre.

In 2016, Shetty played the title role in the romantic thriller Ricky, a directorial debut film of his friend Rishab Shetty. The film was a commercial success. This was followed by Godhi Banna Sadharana Mykattu (2016). Shetty then wrote and produced the 2016 college drama Kirik Party. In 2022, Shetty was seen in 777 Charlie, with his co-star, Charlie, a Labrador. Shetty produced 777 Charlie with the direction of Kiranraj K, under Pinaka Studios and opposite Sangeetha Sringeri. The shooting for this film took more than 5 years. The film focuses on the relationship between pets and pet lovers. In 2023, he starred in Sapta Sagaradaache Ello directed by Hemanth Rao and co-starred Rukmini Vasanth. The film was split into two parts with separate release dates.

=== Pinaka Studios ===
In 2018, Rakshit Shetty, Sachin B. Ravi, and Abhishek.M started a VFX company called Pinaka Studios as a division of Paramvah Studios, with Pinaka Studios providing visual effects, CG, animation, color grading, color correction, motion design and other services for the film, TV, brand experience and advertising industries.

Initially started to provide Visual Effects and Post-Production services for films produced at Paramvah Studios, it also provides services for other films in the industry, such as visual effects for the movie Avane Srimannarayana, starring Rakshit Shetty. The film was compiled with 2000 VFX shots.

== Personal life ==
Rakshit Shetty began dating his co-star Rashmika Mandana during the making of Kirik Party, and the couple got engaged on 3 July 2017 in a private ceremony in her hometown of Virajpet. The couple mutually broke off their engagement in September 2018, citing compatibility issues.

== In the media ==
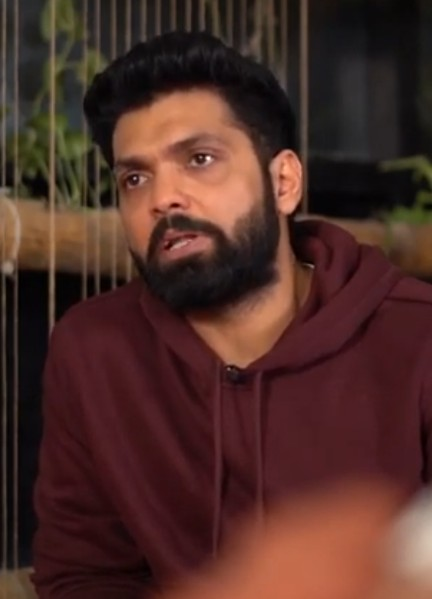
Shetty at an interview in 2019

Shetty's performance in Ulidavaru Kandanthe is regarded as one of the "100 Greatest Performances of the Decade" by Film Companion. He was named the Bangalore Times' Most Desirable Men in 2017. Further, Shetty was placed 2nd in 2018, 3rd in 2019 and 11th in 2020.

== Filmography ==
Key
†	Denotes films that have not yet been released

=== As actor ===
Year	Title	Role	Notes	Ref.
2010	Nam Areal Ond Dina	Aravind		
2012	Tuglak	Raaghu		
2013	Simple Agi Ondh Love Story	Kushal		
2014	Ulidavaru Kandanthe	Richard "Richie" Anthony		
2014	Bahuparak	Richie	Cameo	
2015	Vaastu Prakaara	Kubera		
2015	Jaathre	Himself	Guest appearance	
2016	Ricky	Radhakrishna "Ricky"		
2016	Godhi Banna Sadharana Mykattu	Shiva	Also lyricist	
2016	Jigarthanda	Himself	Guest appearance	
2016	Kirik Party	Karna		
2019	Padde Huli	Karna	Cameo	
2019	Avane Srimannarayana	Inspector Narayana / Vasudev		
2022	777 Charlie	Dharmaraj "Dharma" Dattana		
2023	Vasantha Kokila	Bharath	Cameo	
2023	Sapta Saagaradaache Ello: Side A	Manu		
2023	Sapta Saagaradaache Ello: Side B	Manu	Also lyricist	

=== As director ===
Year	Title	Roles	Notes
2014	Ulidavaru Kandanthe	Richard "Richie" Anthony	also lyricist

=== As producer ===
Year	Title	Notes
2016	Kirik Party	Also lyricist
2018	Humble Politician Nograj	
2018	Katheyondu Shuruvagide	
2019	Avane Srimannarayana	Also writer
2020	Bheemasena Nalamaharaja	
2021	Ramarjuna	
2021	Garuda Gamana Vrishbha Vahana	Presenter only
2022	Sakutumba Sametha	
2022	777 Charlie	
2022	Gargi	Presenter only
2023	Hostel Hudugaru Bekagiddare	Presenter only
2023	Sapta Saagaradaache Ello: Side A	
2023	Sapta Saagaradaache Ello: Side B	Also lyricist
2023	Mithya	
2024	Bachelor Party	
2024	Ekam	TV series; Presenter only

== Accolades ==
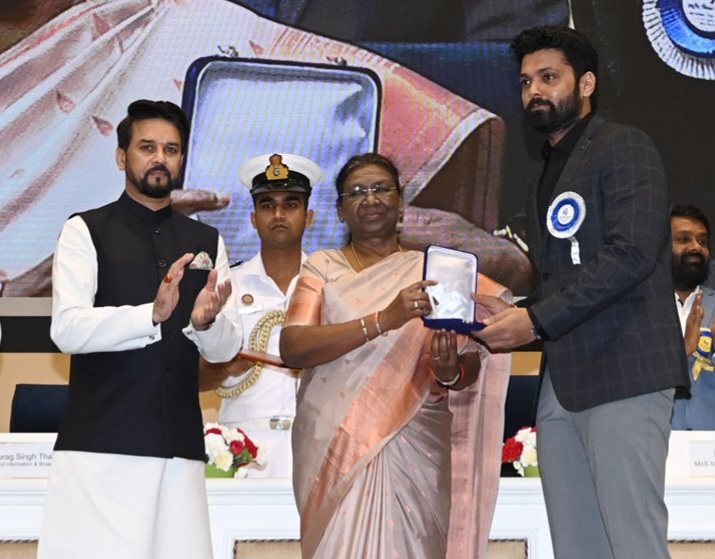
Shetty receiving National Film Award from President Droupadi Murmu at the 69th National Film Awards, 2023

Rakshit Shetty is the recipient of three Filmfare Awards South — Best Director – Kannada for Ulidavaru Kandanthe (2014), Best Actor Critics – Kannada for Kirik Party (2016), and Best Actor – Kannada for Sapta Saagaradaache Ello – Side A & Sapta Saagaradaache Ello – Side B (2023). He also received Karnataka State Film Awards For Ulidavaru Kandanthe and 777 Charlie.

== Controversies ==
=== Regarding the film Kirik Party ===
Lahari Velu, the director of Lahari Music, accused Shetty's banner Paramvah Studios of copyright infringement when his film Kirik Party was due for release. In his complaint, Velu claimed that the song "Hey Who Are You" is similar to "Madhya Raatrili", a song from the film Shanti Kranti by V. Ravichandran and owned by Velu.

Paramva Studios and the film's music director Ajaneesh Loknath also filed a copyright infringement complaint. Kirik Party was released without the song, but the film's producers were allowed to reintroduce it after they deposited Rs 10 lakh in court. He claims that he and the makers won the copyright infringement case but never made it public. However, in 2020, a non-bailable warrant was issued against him and Ajaneesh after they failed to appear when the court summoned them.

According to Deccan Chronicle, when asked to respond to the allegations, he denied the allegation and said, "We have not copied even a single note of the song. Hamsalekha and Ravichandran have inspired me since childhood. That's why we dedicated the song to them. We both understand each other's point of view."

=== Regarding the movie Bachelor Party ===
MRT Music, a renowned music label, accused Shetty and his Paramvah Studios of using two songs "Nyaya Ellide" and "Omme Ninannu Kantumbha" from Nyaya Ellide and Gaali Maathu films respectively in the movie without permission. Naveen Kumar, partner of MRT Music, filed a complaint, highlighting that the music was used without proper licence, leading to a copyright infringement case against Rakshit Shetty.

As per a report by Pinkvilla the Delhi High Court took note of the situation and issued a notice to Rakshit Shetty and Paramvah Studios after they failed to appear in court. The court also ordered the immediate removal of the social media post in which the production house defended its actions. The court's ruling on August 12, 2024, concluded that Rakshit Shetty and Paramvah Studios must pay Rs 20 lakh as compensation to MRT Music for the unauthorized use of their songs.
