= Bazooka (film) =

2025 Malayalam film by Deeno Dennis

- Theatrical release poster
- Directed by: Deeno Dennis
- Written by: Deeno Dennis
- Produced by: Dolwin Kuriakose; Jinu V. Abraham; Vikram Mehra; Siddharth Anand Kumar
- Starring: Mammootty; Gautham Vasudev Menon
- Cinematography: Nimish Ravi; Roby Varghese Raj
- Edited by: Nishadh Yusuf; Praveen Prabhakar
- Music by: Saeed Abbas
- Production companies: Theatre of Dreams; Yoodlee Films; Saregama
- Distributed by: Capital Cinema
- Release date: 10 April 2025
- Running time: 151 minutes
- Country: India
- Language: Malayalam
- Box office: ₹25.50 crore

Bazooka is a 2025 Indian Malayalam-language action thriller film written and directed by Deeno Dennis in his directorial debut. It is produced by Yoodlee Films and Theatre of Dreams, starring Mammootty and Gautham Vasudev Menon.

The project was initially reported in March 2018 as Deeno's debut film. He narrated the one liner to Mammootty, whom he had in mind who accepted to do the film, asked him to take time and write the entire script, and also persuaded Deeno to direct the film. The film was announced in April 2023 with the current title. Principal photography began by mid-May that year in Kochi and concluded in October 2024. It has music by Saeed Abbas, and Midhun Mukundan, cinematography by Nimish Ravi and Roby Varghese Raj, editing by Nishadh Yusuf and Praveen Prabhakar.

Bazooka was released in theatres on 10 April 2025 and received negative reviews, and ended up being a box office failure.

== Plot ==
A painting is smuggled from abroad and spotting it amidst a road check, Benjamin Joshua, an ACP in Kochi, intervenes and transfers it into an encrypted location. Months later, in a Bengaluru-bound bus, a hardcore gamer Sunny acquaints with his co-passenger Aryan Achary, a seemingly introverted accountant, also traveling to the city. Due to a turn of events a curious Sunny goes through Aryan's laptop which reveals that the guy is neither Aryan Acharyan nor an accountant. With his identity leaked, Aryan, revealing himself as John, confides to Sunny about himself.

John is a former police forensic professional who is on sabbatical due to some reasons, and Benjamin Joshua's childhood friend. In Kochi, a mysterious gang of serial robbers who disguise themselves and loot strange items from certain locations create chaos. During the investigation, Benjamin learns that the killers are following the pattern of a video game - each time an officer in Benjamin's team is picked, and sourced with a random clue which should be cracked before the loot happens, which Benjamin's team fails every time. John arrives to aid Benjamin in tracking down the criminal gang. The gang even bugs Benjamin himself by luring his son with a Mario gameset, which the boy keeps despite Benjamin warning him to not take it.

After missing the gang a couple of times, Benjamin nabs one of the boys in the gang who reveals nothing despite being tortured by the police. However, John links the clues to a gameplay with his investigation, and Benjamin's son, also a gamer, reveals about the game he kept out of curiosity. With the boy's help, and playing through the game titles as Bazooka, John and Benjamin crack the final level. John finally finds that it leads to the smuggled painting, which is currently locked in a high-profile customs office in Kochi. John, officially rejoining service, devises a heavy security electric lock to mask the painting at any cost.

Listening to the story, Sunny challenges John that a hardcore hacker can easily crack the lock. John, seeing his confidence, allows him to try. Despite initial hurdles, Sunny cracks the lock hacking into it, which amazes John. As they reach Bangalore, the men part, as Sunny goes on to meet his Instagram girlfriend as planned and John leaves too. Later, Sunny sees in the news that John Caesar, who assisted the police, has been arrested in Kerala in connection to the lock he made failing.

Sunny rushes back to Kochi to know the truth. Meanwhile, Benjamin is in court, trying his best to free John as only he can bring the case to an end. However, the arrested John Caesar is shown to be a different man, Benjamin's childhood friend who was assisting him in the serial robbery case.

Simultaneously, Sunny spots his girlfriend Jovita, whom he met in Bangalore, in a car in Kochi. Sunny follows her in a car with her real boyfriend to their hideout. The duo fights Sunny, who nevertheless overpowers them. Their leader, an eccentric and loud guy revealed to be the same person who posed as John in the bus journey, arrives with the rest of the gang. It is revealed that guy, calling himself "Bazooka" or "Mr. Mario", is a monomaniac and addict gamer whom Benjamin and the real John were trying to trace all along. Bazooka reveals how Benjamin angered him while locking up his painting which has a hidden treasure in it. To exact vengeance, Bazooka and gang employ a series of robberies to trouble Benjamin and the police. However, John Caesar was smarter than their predictions and made it near impossible to lay hands on the painting (Every scene of "John" featured the actual John Caesar who was guiding Benjamin and his team). That's when Bazooka, posing as John and choosing Sunny on whom he has a grudge for continually surpassing him virtually, lures Sunny into cracking the painting lock by leveraging his hacking skills. With the truth unrevealed and learning of the Bazooka gang's insanity, Sunny leaves, feeling helpless. All of the worth looted by the gang is dumped back right in front of the police.

Bazooka is seen flying to Dubai, where in Benjamin and Sunny are shown as his co-passengers in the flight. Benjamin finally gets to interact with Bazooka and assures that he'll lock him up, while Bazooka challenges him to do the same after they land in Dubai (possibly hinting at a sequel).

== Cast ==
- Mammootty as: Aryan Acharya / John Caesar (Fake) / Bazooka
- Gautham Vasudev Menon as ACP Benjamin Joshua IPS
- Divya Pillai as Annie Benjamin
- Sidharth Bharathan as CI Arjun Ramaswamy
- Iswarya Menon as Jovita / Pocket Dynamite
- Shine Tom Chacko as Franco Salvatore / Stonerman (Cameo)
- Sumith Naval as Ansari / Big B
- Hakim Shahjahan as Sunny Varghese / Mr. Mario / SD_47
- Sneha Ajith as Tamil Nadu Police Officer
- Bhama Arun as SI Saniya
- Dinu Dennis as CI Tony
- Joemon Jyothir
- Abin Bino as Conductor
- Zena Shankar as Mia / Superblondie
- Vasisht Umesh
- Binu Pappu as Psychartist Zachariah Varghese
- Meenakshi Raveendran
- Joe John Chacko as Cerealkiller
- Babu Antony as John Caesar (Cameo)
- Santhosh Varkey (Arattu Annan) as a biker (cameo)

== Production ==
=== Development ===
In March 2018, it was reported that Deeno Dennis, son of veteran scriptwriter Kaloor Dennis, would direct a film starring Mammootty in the lead role. Dennis is known for scripting 24 of Mammootty' films from Aa Rathri to Ezhupunna Tharakan. It would mark Deeno's debut as a director. According to Deeno it would be the first "game thriller" in Malayalam cinema and will have elements connected to gaming and he also described it as a "mass thriller" which would have elements of action, drama, romance, humour and adventure. The Untitled film was intended to start shooting in December 2018. Meanwhile, Mammootty will be wrapping up his ongoing projects such as Yathra, Uncle, Abrahaminte Santhathikal and Maamaankam.

"I knew Mammootty listens only to one-liners so I made a story outline and approached him. But he listened for two and a half hours, and asked me to take my time and write the entire script. I was planning to rope in another director but Mammootty asked me to direct the film myself, so here I am."

— Deeno Dennis, on Mammootty's involvement in the film.

Four years later, on 2 June 2022, production manager N. M. Badusha announced through social media that the film would be bankrolled by Dolwin Kuriakose and Jinu V. Abraham under the banner of Theatre of Dreams. At the same time, Nimish Ravi was signed on as the cinematographer. Jinu revealed to OTTplay that the film was not the project that Deeno had planned in 2018. The same month it was also reported that the film would go on floor the next year. On 9 April 2023, Mammootty announced the film officially by revealing its title to be Bazooka, which would also be co produced by Saregama under their film studio Yoodlee Films with Vikram Mehra and Sidharth Anand Kumar serving as the co-producers . Nishadh Yusuf and Midhun Mukundan were recruited as editor and music composer respectively. Editing credits are shared between Nishadh Yusuf and Praveen Prabhakar. Midhun was later replaced by Saeed Abbas.

=== Casting ===
In March 2023, Gautham Vasudev Menon was signed to play a prominent role. In May 2023, Iswarya Menon and Divya Pillai were chosen to play major female roles. The other female actors include Bhama Arun and Gayathiri Iyer. Siddharth Bharathan was cast in a significant role who later associated with Mammootty in Bramayugam. Sumith Naval, known for appearing in early Amal Neerad films, is making a comeback and joined the cast in July 2023. In July 2023, Babu Antony was reported to play a role. Abin Bino was cast to play a role in the film.

=== Filming ===
It was reported that the filming would begin by the end of April 2023 and was expected to be completed by July–August, with 90–100 days of shooting in Coimbatore, Kochi and Bengaluru. Filming was later postponed following the death of Mammootty's mother. Principal photography began on 10 May 2023 with a puja ceremony at the Samudrika Convention Centre in Willingdon Island. Mammootty joined the sets on 12 May 2023. Mammootty completed his shooting portions on 5 August 2023. In August 2023, Hakkim Shah met with an accident on the set while riding a bike as part of a chase sequence. Mammootty shot for 45 days for the film.

The final shooting schedule started on 21 February 2024 progressing in Kochi, primarily filming the scenes featuring Gautham Vasudev Menon. It was reported that shooting concluded after 90 days on 22 March 2024. However, the filmmakers revealed that some scenes involving Gautham Vasudev Menon were yet to be completed, with plans for a short 2-3 day schedule. The delay has been due to scheduling conflicts, as both Mammootty and Gautham are currently working on an untitled upcoming project. The entire filming was wrapped up in October 2024. The cinematography will be handled by Nimish Ravi. Stunt Silva is in charge of choreographing action sequences. Nimish Ravi was unable to join the final schedule due to date conflicts as he was on a project in Hyderabad. Roby Varghese Raj stepped in to film the remaining portions.

=== Post production ===
The post-production works started in July 2024. The patchwork shoots were conducted in Kochi in September 2024.

== Music ==
The film's music was composed by Saeed Abbas. Midhun Mukundan was initially attached as the composer. However, newcomer Saeed Abbas was selected to compose the teaser music. Abbas, an assistant of Sushin Shyam had earlier composed for Mahesh Narayanan's segment Sherlock in the anthology film, Manorathangal. After scoring the teaser Abbas was selected to do the background score of the film, with Midhun Mukundan still retained as the song composer. However, gradually Abbas replaced Mukundan as the sole composer of the film.

Track listing
No.	Title	Lyrics	Music	Singer(s)	Length
1.	"Loading Bazooka"	Bins	Saeed Abbas	Sreenath Bhasi	2:40

== Marketing ==
The teaser of the film was released on 15 August 2024, coinciding with India's Independence Day. A promotional poster was also released, revealing the film's official release date. The official trailer was released on 26 March 2025.

== Release ==
=== Theatrical ===
Earlier reports indicated that Bazooka would be released alongside Mohanlal's directorial debut Barroz in December 2023, during Christmas. However, it was delayed and pushed to 2024. It was later reported that Bazooka and Barroz would release on the same day, 12 September 2024, during Onam. Despite these plans, the film was further delayed and was scheduled for the release on either late 2024 or early 2025. The film got a release date as February 14, 2025, but was revised to April 10, 2025.

=== Home media ===
The post theatrical digital rights of the film is acquired by ZEE5 and satellite rights by Zee Keralam.

== Reception ==
Bazooka received negative reviews from critics.

Anandu Suresh of The Indian Express rated the film with 2/5 stars and wrote "A dashing Mammootty powers through a severely underwritten, yet sleek flick".

"Sajin Shrijith of The Week rated the film 1/5 stars and wrote "Watching Bazooka feels like attending multiple lectures given by some of the most boring teachers who took a crash course in their respective subjects".
