= Ramachandra Boss & Co =

2023 Malayalam film directed by Haneef Adeni

- Poster
- Directed by: Haneef Adeni
- Written by: Haneef Adeni
- Produced by: Listin Stephen; Nivin Pauly
- Starring: Nivin Pauly
- Cinematography: Vishnu Thandassery
- Edited by: Nishadh Yusuf
- Music by: Midhun Mukundan
- Production companies: Magic Frames; Pauly Jr. Pictures
- Distributed by: Magic Frames
- Release date: 25 August 2023
- Running time: 147 minutes
- Country: India
- Language: Malayalam

Ramachandra Boss & Co is a 2023 Indian Malayalam-language heist action comedy film written and directed by Haneef Adeni. The film stars Nivin Pauly, alongside Aarsha Chandini Baiju, Jaffar Idukki, Vinay Forrt, Mamitha Baiju, Vijilesh and Sreenath Babu. The plot follows Ramachandra Boss, a benevolent bandit who, along with his team of misfits, plans a heist called Pravasi Heist at Amar Palace.

The film was tentatively titled NP 42, being the 42nd film of Nivin Pauly. The official title, Ramachandra Boss & Co, was announced in July 2023. Principal photography began in January 2023 in the United Arab Emirates and was wrapped up in May 2023. The music is composed by Midhun Mukundan, while Vishnu Thandassery and Nishad Yusuf handled the cinematography and editing.

Ramachandra Boss & Co was released on 25 August 2023 during Onam, where it received negative reviews from critics and became a box office failure.

== Plot ==
Years ago in Persia, Ram Madhav was a famous painter who was killed by his illegitimate son Amar Madhav for killing his mother Salma. His mother abandoned him shortly after his birth and it was Ram Madhav who nurtured Amar. Amar kills Ram Madhav and takes the painting of his mother with him as his last remembrance of her.

Years later, in Kerala, Sidhiq, a plumber and electrician, Sophia, an IT engineer, Zachariah, a cook, and Robin, a CCTV tehnician get an invitation from Ramachandra Boss & Co for a project in Dubai. Upon reaching Dubai they realize that they've been called to undertake a robbery planned by Ramachandra and his assistant Sailesh. Hearing this, they want to return home but are compelled to commit the robbery because of their own personal troubles. As a part of their trial strategy, they rob the bag belonging to Jessy who is also in Dubai and joins them on the mission after her passport goes missing.

They target the painting, Salma the angel, which is kept in Amar Palace. Ramachandra tells them that it was his mother's painting that was allegedly stolen by Amar Madhav, killing his father Ram Madhav and Ramachandra, who witnessed the murder as a toddler.

They join as workers in Amar Palace gaining control over the palace by hijacking the security system and all the happenings in the palace can be monitored remotely by Ramachandra. Inside the palace Sailesh gets apprehended by Amar and his henchmen and through Shailesh, Ramachandra's whereabouts get revealed. They reach his location only to find that Ramachandra and his gang have escaped through a tunnel beneath their tent.

Amar plans to sell the painting in the exhibition hall during the biennale at the Hotel Grand Park. The painting is taken to the exhibition hall by a truck, where Ramachandra and his gang disguisedly chase the truck and seize it, merely to find out that Amar has replaced the original painting.

During the biennale exhibition, Ramachandra's gang arrives holding Amar at threat of firearms. Sailesh and Siddique seize and pass the painting through a duct system and Mathan who receives it, gives it to the Russians who want to buy it before realizing that it is fake. Ramachandra's gang is captured by enraged Amar, who demands that Ramachandra return the painting, but Ramachandra tells him to kill his gang and that all he needed was the painting. Amar then chases Ramachandra and engages in a fight during which Amar is slain. Later, it is revealed that it was Alex, one of Amar's henchmen, who helped Ramachandra break the ducts in the mid way, replacing the painting, sending fake through it and keeping the original underneath Ramachandra's car. Mathan, who collects money from Russians in exchange for the painting, hides the original money and returns them fake money when the Russians ask for it back, realizing the painting is a duplicate. The money is then distributed to Ramachandra's gang, who then return to Kerala. They arrive in Kerala and find where Ramachandra's mother is. It is revealed that Salma is still alive and had used the conman Ramachandra to concoct a false story to get back her painting drawn by her husband who was killed by Amar.

== Cast ==
- Nivin Pauly as Ramachandra Boss / Boss Bonaventure
- Vinay Forrt as Sailesh P Damodar
- Jaffar Idukki as Siddique
- Mamitha Baiju as Sophia
- Aarsha Chandini Baiju as Jessy Thomas
- Vijilesh Karayad as Zachariah
- Sreenath Babu as Robin
- Munish as Amar Madhav
- Jaya Prada as Salma
- Nassar as Ram Madhav
- Mithun Ramesh as Mathan
- Sowmya Menon as Salomy
- Siju Karackal as Alex

== Production ==
Nivin Pauly's NP42 was announced by Ramachandra Boss & Co on 8 July 2023. The film marked the second collaboration of Nivin and Haneef Adeni after Mikhael. Though the makers were secretive about the project, Vinay Forrt, who plays a crucial role in the film, it was revealed to be a fun entertainer revolving around a heist. Vishnu Thandassery was hired as the cinematographer, while Nishad Yusuf and Midhun Mukundan were hired as the music director and editor for the film. The film was produced by Listin Stephen's Magic Frames and Nivin Pauly's Pauly Jr. Pictures.

=== Filming ===
The majority of the film was shot in Dubai, United Arab Emirates, and Kerala. The filming was divided into two schedules; the first began on 20 January 2023 in the UAE and lasted about 55 days. The second schedule took place in Kerala. The principal photography was wrapped up on 19 May 2023. The title poster was unveiled on 8 July 2023 by Suresh Gopi through social media.

== Soundtrack ==
Ramachandra Boss & Co

Soundtrack album by Midhun Mukundan
- Released: 2023
- Venue: Bangalore
- Studio: Pranava Studios
- Genre: Feature film soundtrack
- Language: Malayalam
- Label: Magic Frames Music
- Producer: Midhun Mukundan

Midhun Mukundan chronology
Poovan (2023)	Ramachandra Boss & Co (2023)

The music and background score for the film is composed by Midhun Mukundan. The lyrics are written by Suhail Koya. The first single titled "Yalla Habibi," written by Suhail Koya and sung by Zia Ul Haq, Vidyaa Prakash, and Midhun Mukundan, was released on 15 August 2023 on the occasion of Indian Independence Day.

No.	Title	Lyrics	Singer(s)	Length
1.	"Yalla Habibi"	Suhail Koya	Zia Ul Haq, Vidyaa Prakash, Midhun Mukundan	3:41
2.	"Habibi Drip"	Dabzee	Dabzee	3:05

== Release ==
=== Theatrical ===
The film was released on 25 August 2023 on Onam.

== Reception ==
=== Critical reception ===
Sanjith Sidhardhan of OTTPlay gave the film 3.5 stars out of 5 and wrote "Ramachandra Boss and Co benefits a lot from Vinay Forrt's character, who sometimes overshadow Nivin Pauly's; but the makers are self-aware and use this as part of the story too."

Cris of The News Minute gave the film 1.5/5 stars and wrote "Director Haneef Adeni attempts to give a comic treatment to a heist, with Nivin leading a gang of desperate individuals, but the poorly written script does nothing for the film." Sajin Shrijith of Cinema Express gave the film 1.5/5 stars and wrote "There is a big villain problem in Haneef Adeni's movies: the characterisations and performances get worse with each film."

Anandu Suresh of The Indian Express gave the film 1/5 stars and wrote "Ramachandra Boss and Co serves as a testament to how much a film can suffer due to subpar writing."

Athira M of The Hindu reviewed and wrote "This heist comedy headlined by Nivin Pauly is sans any thrills. A weak script and poorly executed scenes take the fun out of Haneef Adeni's movie, which stars a bunch of talented actors."
