= Alidu Ulidavaru =

2019 Indian Kannada thriller film

- Theatrical release poster
- Directed by: Arvind Sastry
- Written by: Dialogues: Praveen Kumar G Pawan Bhat
- Screenplay by: Arvind Sastry
- Story by: Sudheer Shanbhogue
- Produced by: Ashu Bedra
- Starring: Ashu Bedra; Atul Kulkarni; Pawan Kumar; Sangeetha Bhat
- Cinematography: Abhishek Kasaragodu; Arvind S Kashyap; Abin Rajesh
- Edited by: Suresh Arumugam; Arvind Sastry
- Music by: Midhun Mukundan
- Production company: Ashu Bedra Ventures
- Release date: 6 December 2019
- Running time: 122 minutes
- Country: India
- Language: Kannada

Alidu Ulidavaru is a 2019 Indian Kannada-language thriller film directed by Arvind Sastry and starring Ashu Bedra, Atul Kulkarni, Pawan Kumar and Sangeetha Bhat. The film follows a popular TV show host and myth-buster of superstitions who is working on the 100th episode of his show, is caught in the whirlwind of numbers, TRPs and relationships as he uncovers the secret that haunts him. The film was released to predominately positive reception.

== Plot ==
Sheelam, an agnostic, is an author and host of a top show that deals with checking whether haunted places really exist. Ahead of his 100th episode, he is thrown a challenge by a youngster who asks him to disprove that his house is haunted. What happens then?

== Cast ==
- Ashu Bedra as Sheelam
- Atul Kulkarni
- Pawan Kumar
- Sangeetha Bhat
- Dharmanna Kadur
- Dinesh Mangaluru
- B. Suresha as company head
- Arvind Rau as company head
- Rockline Sudhakar

== Reception ==
A critic from The Times of India rated the film 3.5/5 and wrote, "Alidu Ulidavaru is different from the usual crop of thrillers. If you're game for a film that tries to get your mind busy and engaged with a story that is more than just obvious frights, then this stands a chance to live up to your expectations". A critic from The New Indian Express wrote, "With TRPs being the subject of Alidu Ulidvaru, this new pattern of filmmaking will work well with viewers, since it also gives a glimpse of what goes on behind the scenes in the lives of anchors and reporters of various TV channels". Baradwaj Rangan of Film Companion wrote, "These are interesting touches, but they don’t come together in a way that spooks you. In this kind of movie, the house may or may not be overrun by ghosts. But the audience should definitely end up haunted".
