= Shodha =

2025 Kannada psychological crime thriller web series

- Genre: Suspense crime thriller, murder mystery.
- Written by: Suhas Navarathna
- Directed by: Sunil Mysuru
- Starring: Pawan Kumar; Siri Ravikumar; Anusha Ranganath; Arun Sagar; Diya Hegde; Shwetha Prasad; Ravi Hunsur
- Composer: Arjun Ramu
- Country of origin: India
- Original language: Kannada

Production
- Producers: Karthik; Yogi G Raj
- Cinematography: Rahul Roy
- Editor: Anil Anirudh
- Production company: KRG Studios

Original release
- Network: ZEE5
- Release: 29 August 2025

Shodha is an Indian Kannada-language suspense crime thriller web series directed by Sunil Mysuru and written by Suhas Navarathna. Pawan Kumar stars as a rule-bending lawyer opposite Siri Ravikumar. Produced by KRG Studios, the six-episode series premiered on ZEE5 on 29 August 2025.

== Premise ==
Rohit, a sharp but ethically flexible lawyer, files a missing person report for his wife while she stands beside him. The case spirals into questions of memory and identity as Rohit insists the woman is an impostor. Pre-release coverage notes references to Kodava folklore and a psychological tone.

== Cast ==
- Pawan Kumar as Rohith
- Siri Ravikumar as Meera
- Anusha Ranganath
- Arun Sagar
- Diya Hegde
- Shwetha Prasad
- Ravi Hunsur
- Sapthami Gowda
- Gagan Chinnappa

== Production and release ==
KRG Studios, headed by Karthik Gowda and Yogi G. Raj, produced the series for ZEE5 as part of its line-up of Kannada originals.

Shodha was initially slated to premiere on 22 August 2025, but the release was pushed to 29 August 2025.

== Episodes ==
| No. | Title | Directed by | Original release date |
|---|---|---|---|
| 1 | "Meera Missing" | Sunil Mysuru | 29 August 2025 |
At his birthday gathering, Rohith finds Meera missing and senses something is wrong.
| 2 | "Who is She?" | Sunil Mysuru | 29 August 2025 |
Rohith tests the woman claiming to be Meera, alarming those around him as his search only deepens the uncertainty.
| 3 | "Drama" | Sunil Mysuru | 29 August 2025 |
As Tara prepares for a play, tensions at home escalate and Rohith’s plan is upended by a disturbing discovery.
| 4 | "The Mask Man" | Sunil Mysuru | 29 August 2025 |
A family round of “two truths and a lie” turns deadly as buried secrets begin to unravel.
| 5 | "The Confession" | Sunil Mysuru | 29 August 2025 |
With police closing in, a confession changes the case while Rohith and Bhairava play a costly game.
| 6 | "Not The End" | Sunil Mysuru | 29 August 2025 |
The truth behind Meera’s disappearance emerges; time brings some healing but leaves questions unresolved.

== Reception ==
Prathibha Joy of OTT Play gave the series a rating of 3/5, noting that "Shodha takes inspiration from the 2024 Hindi series, but has been redone nicely by fixing the plot holes of the original." Chaithra Chidananda M of The Times of India rated it 4/5, writing that "Shodha is not just another suspense thriller, it’s a cleverly adapted story brought alive with powerful performances, emotional depth, and a gripping screenplay. For those who enjoy edge-of-the-seat narratives laced with sentiment and surprise, this original Kannada web series is an absolute must-watch."

Nandini Ramnath of Scroll.in observed that "Shodha feels like a movie chopped up into instalments. This device strings out the suspense a bit longer and helps savour the twists that start piling up in later episodes. The biggest spoiler is that there isn’t a spoiler, except that the show’s makers do a decent job but could have tried harder."
