= Nimish Ravi =

Indian cinematographer

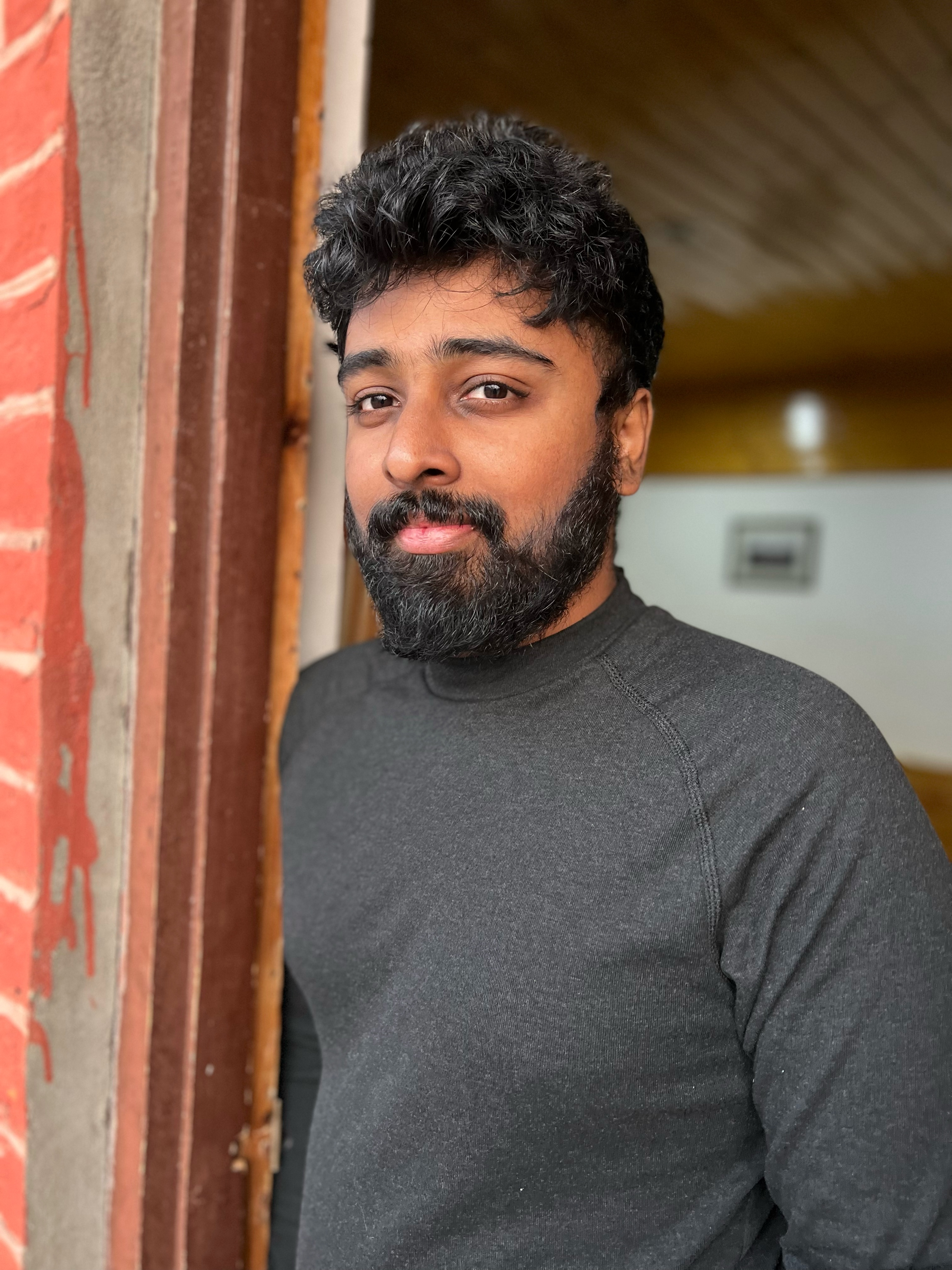
- Nimish Ravi as of 2021
- Born: 13 November 1994 (age 31); Thiruvananthapuram, Kerala
- Occupation: Cinematographer
- Years active: 2019–present
- Spouse: Ahaana Krishna (m. 2026)

Nimish Ravi (born 13 November 1994) is an Indian cinematographer who works primarily in Malayalam cinema. He made his feature‐film debut as director of photography with Luca (2019). He gained wide recognition for his period work on Kurup, for which he won the SIIMA Award for Best Cinematography, and the ultramodern Lokah Chapter 1: Chandra (2025). His other notable credits include Rorschach (2022), King of Kotha (2023), and Lucky Baskhar (2024).

== Career ==
He has been the recipient of SIIMA Awards for best cinematography for Kurup (2021). He is known for his work in his debut film, Luca (2019). Followed by the success of Kurup and Rorschach (2022). He reunited with Dulquer Salmaan and Mammootty in King of Kotha (2023) and Bazooka, respectively.

== Personal life ==
On 13 September 2026, Nimish married actress Ahaana Krishna.

== Filmography ==
=== Films ===
Year	Title	Language	Notes	Ref.
2019	Luca	Malayalam	Debut in Malayalam cinema	
2021	Sara's	Malayalam		
2021	Kurup	Malayalam		
2022	Rorschach	Malayalam		
2023	King of Kotha	Malayalam		
2024	Lucky Baskhar	Telugu	Debut in Telugu cinema	
2025	Bazooka	Malayalam		
2025	Lokah Chapter 1: Chandra	Malayalam		
2026	Vishwanath & Sons	Tamil	Debut in Tamil cinema	

=== Other Works ===
Year	Title	Language	Notes	Ref.
2021	Thonnal	Malayalam	Music Video	
2022	Me Myself & I	Malayalam	Web Series	
2024	Manorathangal	Malayalam	Anthology Series; Segment:Kazhcha	
2024	Shades Of Baby Pink	Telugu	Short Film	
2026	Pookkal	Malayalam	Musical Video	

== Awards and nominations ==
Year	Award	Category	Work	Result	Ref.
2022	10th South Indian International Movie Awards	Best Cinematographer – Malayalam	Kurup	Won	
