= Bannada Gejje =

- Directed by: Rajendra Singh Babu
- Screenplay by: Rajendra Singh Babu
- Story by: Rajendra Singh Babu
- Produced by: Rajendra Singh Babu
- Starring: Ravichandran; Amala
- Cinematography: P. S. Prakash
- Edited by: Gowtham Raju
- Music by: Hamsalekha
- Production company: Rohini Pictures
- Release date: 1990
- Running time: 150 minutes
- Country: India
- Language: Kannada

Bannada Gejje (transl. Colorful Anklet) is a 1990 Indian Kannada-language film written and directed by Rajendra Singh Babu starring Ravichandran and Amala. The music is scored by Hamsalekha. The supporting cast features Bharathi Vishnuvardhan, Kalyan Kumar, Suresh Heblikar, Amjad Khan and Devaraj. The film was simultaneously shot in Telugu as Prema Yuddham.

== Plot ==
Vaijayanti devi, lead Dancer is part of Suresh Jayasimha's ballet troop. She marries Peter, against Suresh Jayasimha's wishes and retires. Suresh gets Peter fired from his job and Peter turns alcoholic. Vaijayanti sires a son Manu. Manu, aspiring Singer and Dancer is at loggerheads with his rival Deluxe. In a tussle, Manu tries to save Deluxe's brother Raja, but Deluxe sees Manu with knife in hand. Deluxe's younger sister Menaka falls for Manu. Deluxe, who is overprotective about his sister, burns Shiva, who tries to molest Menaka. Deluxe, when he finds Manu and Menaka together, almost kills Manu. Vaijayanti, who is progressively losing eye-sight, cries out that her dreams of turning Manu into a Great Artist expresses her disappointment that Manu has ditched her ambition. Manu goes in search of Menaka, only to find she has left the town. After many months, He finds Menaka is now a famous dancer & shuns Manu. Suresh Jayasimha, approaches Manu and Menaka separately to join his dance-troop.
Ravi, starts a Dance School and Menaka too joins it. Manu flirts with Julie to instigate Menaka, who now realises her love towards Menaka. Vaijayanti loses her eye-sight on the day, Manu does a Stage-Dance Bannada Gejje. Manu and Menaka ditch Suresh Jayasimha on the day of scheduled Dance and run away to Delhi. Suresh Jayasimha and Deluxe separate the love-birds and threaten, but at the end Manu and Menaka fight together and walks away to live a new life.

== Cast ==
- Ravichandran as Manu
- Amala as Menaka
- Bharathi Vishnuvardhan as Vaijayantidevi
- Kalyan Kumar as Peter
- Suresh Heblikar as Suresh Jayasimha
- Amjad Khan Taxi Driver Gabbar Singh
- Devaraj as Deluxe
- Tennis Krishna
- Sihi Kahi Chandru
- Vani Viswanath as Julie

== Soundtrack ==
Bannada Gejje

Soundtrack album by Hamsalekha
- Released: 1989
- Genre: Feature film soundtrack
- Length: 40:40
- Label: Lahari Music

Hamsalekha composed the film's background score and music for its soundtrack, also writing its lyrics. The soundtrack album consists of seven tracks. The songs were chartbusters and created a massive hype.

All lyrics are written by Hamsalekha.

Tracklist
No.	Title	Singer(s)	Length
1.	"He Enele Mari Koose"	S. P. Balasubrahmanyam, Mano	4:47
2.	"Swathi Mutthina Male Haniye"	S. P. Balasubrahmanyam, S. Janaki	6:19
3.	"Prema Geema Jaanedo"	Ramesh, S. Janaki	6:07
4.	"Dance Dance"	S. P. Balasubrahmanyam, S. Janaki	4:51
5.	"Yoga Yoga"	S. P. Balasubrahmanyam, Latha Hamsalekha	4:42
6.	"Jodusthinayyo Brahma Ninge"	S. P. Balasubrahmanyam, S. Janaki	4:45
7.	"Ee Bannada Gejje"	Ramesh, S. Janaki	9:09
Total length:			40:40

== Legacy ==
The song "Swathi Muthina Male Haniye" inspired a film of same name.

== Trivia ==
- Amjad Khan who debuted in Kannada movies with this movie, had an extended cameo as the Taxi Driver, who takes Manu and Menaka to Taj Mahal
- Though Bannada Gejje was made at a huge budget, the movie had a lacklustre run at Box-Office
- Ravichandran and Rajendra Singh Babu, had a major fallout and never worked together after Bannada Gejje
