= Siri Ravikumar =

Indian actress

- Born: 14 October 1989 (age 36); Bangalore, India
- Occupations: Actress; Model; Playback Singer; Radio Jockey
- Years active: 2016–present

Siri Ravikumar is an Indian model, former Radio Jockey, singer and an actress who primarily works in Kannada films.

== Career ==
After playing cameo roles in many films and performing in theatre plays, She played her first major role in Kavaludaari (2019) followed by a lead role in Sakutumba Sametha (2022), whilst her singing debut was with Arishadvarga (2019) for which she received SIIMA Award for Best Female Playback Singer- Kannada nomination. She further played lead roles in films such as Hope (2022), Swathi Mutthina Male Haniye (2023) and Bachelor Party (2024). Swathi Mutthina Male Haniye won her the Filmfare Award for Best Actress – Kannada.

== Filmography ==
Key
†	Denotes films that have not yet been released

Year	Title	Role	Notes	Ref.
2016	Badmaash		Uncredited	
2017	Beti	Julekha		
2019	Kavaludaari	Geetha Muttanna		
2021	Kyaabare	Arbeen Taj	Web Series	
2022	Sakutumba Sametha	Shraddha		
2022	By Mistake	Mythri	Web Series	
2022	Hope	Priya		
2023	Swathi Mutthina Male Haniye	Prerana		
2024	Bachelor Party	Sandhya		
2024	Abracadabra	Sudha	Released in film festival	
2024	O2	Shrushti		
2024	Bisi-Bisi Ice-Cream	The Mysterious Girl		
2025	Shodha		Web Series	

== Awards and nominations ==
Year	Award	Category	Film	Result	Ref.
2019	9th South Indian International Movie Awards	Best Female Playback Singer - Kannada	Arishadvarga	Nominated	
2024	3 August 2024	Best Actress – Kannada	Swathi Mutthina Male Haniye	Won	
