= Kahi (film) =

2016 Kannada-language film

- Official poster
- Directed by: Arvind Sastry
- Written by: Arvind Sastry
- Produced by: Rekha Venkatesh; Nagasheela Prakash
- Starring: Suraj Gowda
- Cinematography: C. K. Vinyas; R S Prashanth
- Edited by: Arvind Sastry
- Music by: Midhun Mukundan
- Production company: Boiled Beans Picture
- Release date: 4 November 2016
- Running time: 94 minutes
- Country: India
- Language: Kannada

Kahi (transl. Bitter) is a 2016 Indian Kannada-language thriller drama film directed by Arvind Sastry and starring newcomers. The songs of the film gained media recognition prior to its release. The film won the Karnataka State Film Award for Best Screenplay.

== Cast ==
- Suraj Gowda as Raghu
- Harisharva as Hari
- Mathangi Prasan
- Krishi Thapanda
- Aravind Iyer as Ravi

== Reception ==
Sunayana Suresh of The Times of India wrote that "The film manages to entertain, provided you aren't the typical cinematic audience that wants stories laced with the romance-song-dance-fight routines". Shyam Prasad of Bangalore Mirror said that "Kahi (bitter) is a commendable attempt by newcomers that furthers the 'new wave' of Kannada films. On the contrary, a critic from The Hindu wrote that "You are left with more questions than answers at the end of Kahi. And like the protagonists, you too are being asked to survive the bitter pill". Rakesh Mehar of The News Minute opined that "Not all of the film's narrative jumps and juxtapositions work well enough, and there are portions that could have done with more finesse. But to see such a narrative attempt coming out of Kannada cinema is indeed a welcome surprise".
