= Mayabazar 2016 =

2020 Kannada Fantasy Film

- Theatrical release poster
- Directed by: Radhakrishna Reddy
- Written by: Radhakrishna Reddy
- Produced by: Ashwini Puneeth Rajkumar; M. Govinda
- Starring: Raj B. Shetty; Vasishta Simha; Achyuth Kumar; Prakash Raj; Sudha Rani; Chaithra Rao; Sadhu Kokila
- Cinematography: Abhishek G. Kasargod
- Edited by: Jagadeesh N.
- Music by: Midhun Mukundan
- Production company: PRK Productions
- Distributed by: Sri Vajreshwari Combines
- Release date: 28 February 2020
- Running time: 133 minutes
- Country: India
- Language: Kannada

Mayabazar 2016 (transl. Market of illusions) is a 2020 Indian Kannada-language crime comedy film written and directed by debutant Radhakrishna Reddy, and produced by Ashwini Puneeth Rajkumar of PRK Productions, M Govinda. The film stars Raj B. Shetty, Vasishta Simha, Achyuth Kumar, Prakash Raj and Chaithra Rao. The movie is about events surrounding the 2016 Indian banknote demonetization and revolves around an honest police officer, a small-time conman, a jobless youth and a corrupt cop who end up crossing each other's paths when they are in quest of money.

The film was theatrically released on 28 February 2020. The movie was remade same year in Tamil as Naanga Romba Busy (2020).

== Plot ==
The story is set in Bangalore, a few months before the demonetisation of 2016, and tells the story of three men from different walks of life to cope with the trials and tribulations of life before and after the note ban. Kubera is a small-time crook in trouble with the law and resorts to conning people to pay off some corrupt cops and live peacefully. Joseph is an honest police officer who draws flak from everyone in the police department for not accepting bribes, however, his wife is a staunch supporter of his virtuous ways. His strong stance to never stoop to corruption puts him in a quandary when his wife is diagnosed with cancer, and he begins to contemplate ways of raising money for her surgery.

Providence puts Joseph into a position of power, where he is able to spy upon people possessing black money right after demonetisation is enforced in the country. With his wife's condition forcing his hand, Joseph concocts a plan to rob people of their ill-gotten gains, with Kubera posing as an income tax officer. On one such raid, the fake IT inspector notices Raji hiding in a house, who offers him a large sum of money in exchange for not apprehending him. However, Raji soon discovers that the IT officers are fake, and demands a share of Joseph and Kubera's earnings after tailing them back to their hideout in exchange for his silence. Joseph is unhappy but reluctantly acquiesces to his demands.

It emerges that the money which Raji stole actually belonged to a highly ranked, violent cop Ashok Rao, who is furious upon discovery of the theft and embarks upon a quest to bring the thieves to justice. After Joseph realises this, he contemplates stopping further raids but is dissuaded by Kubera and Raji, who are greedy for more money. He agrees to plan and execute one final raid on Pataaki Pandu, a corrupt politician to raise the deficit amount for his wife's surgery. However, the plan goes awry, and Raji barely escapes with his life. This causes him to develop cold feet and quit the gang and Joseph too reneges on the plan. Joseph apologises to Ashok for stealing the money, who forgives him because of the dire circumstances which forced him to do so. The money for the surgery is raised through a trust fund, and Joseph's conscience is relaxed, as the burden of having stolen money is released from his head. Kubera decides to go ahead with the plan again, and this time he hits pay dirt by unearthing a huge stack of black money Pandu possessed. However, he gets arrested by Ashok before he can escape with the money. Ashok boasts to have robbed several people this way, which is recorded by Raji, who had actually volunteered to assist Kubera remotely. Ashok is forced to let Kubera and Raji go scot-free, and they use the stolen money to flee the country and are shown relaxing on the beach in Bangkok.

== Cast ==
- Raj B. Shetty as Kubera
- Vasishta Simha as Carpenter Raji
- Achyuth Kumar as Joseph, a Police Inspector
- Prakash Raj as ACP Ashok Rao
- Sudha Rani as Usha, Joseph's wife
- Chaithra Rao as Raaji's Girlfriend
- Sadhu Kokila as Pataki Paandu, Corporator
- Honnavalli Krishna as Constable Achar
- Huccha Venkat as Salesman
- Rockline Sudhakar
- KB Pavan as Bank Officer
- Shravan Aithal as Fake Income Tax officer
- Puneeth Rajkumar in a Special Appearance "Loka Maya Bazaru" song

== Production ==
Mayabazar 2016 is the second venture of PRK Productions. Shooting began on 24 January 2018 in Sri Kanteerava Studio.

The film is the joint production of Ashwini Puneeth Rajkumar and M Govindu who earlier made Doddmane Hudga starring Puneeth Rajkumar. Govindu liked the subject of debutant director Radhakrishna's story and went on to seek the opinion of Puneeth. Puneeth expressed intention of jointly producing the film under his banner of PRK Productions. Costumes were designed by Upendra Shivu and Yogi G. Raj for (Puneeth Rajkumar). Suresh Baganur was the art director.

== Soundtrack ==
Mayabazar 2016

Soundtrack album by Midhun Mukundan
- Released: 2020
- Recorded: 2019
- Studio: PRK Productions
- Genre: Feature film soundtrack
- Length: 10:16
- Label: PRK Audio

Midhun Mukundan chronology
Sarvajanikarige Suvarnavakasha (2019)	Mayabazar 2016 (2020)

No.	Title	Lyrics	Singer(s)	Length
1.	"Loka Maya Bazaru"	Yogaraj Bhat	S. P. Balasubrahmanyam	3:06
2.	"Neenyaaro"	KB Pavan	Midhun Mukundan, Chaithra J. Achar	3:41
3.	"Koneyilla Modalilla"	KB Pavan	Nitin Rajaram Shastri	3:29

== Release ==
The film's official trailer was released on 17 February 2020 on 'PRK Audio' YouTube channel.

The film was released on 28 February 2020, and distributed by production's parent company Sri Vajreshwari Combines. The satellite rights of the film were bought by Star Suvarna. It was released in the United States on 6 March, after successfully running in India, and on online video platform Amazon Prime on 3 April 2020.

== Critical reception ==
Vivek M. V. of Deccan Herald rated the film 3.5/5 stars and wrote, "Mayabazar 2016 by debutant Radhakrishna Reddy, is an excellent comedy of desperation. Helmed by a stellar cast, the directors weaves in genres like comedy, thriller and drama very well." Giving the same rating, The Hans India critic wrote, "The casting of characters is just perfect. the first half is pacy while the post interval scenes drag a little. Yet the movie is worth a watch." A. Sharadhaa of The New Indian Express wrote, "The thriller, however, works more as a comedy, and the director has made the effort to add humour to a serious subject."

Sunayana Suresh of The Times of India gave the film 3.5/5 stars and wrote, "The first half is a breezy watch, while the emotional content in the second half does slow the pace a tad bit. Though, Mayabazar 2016 is definitely one of the better comedies that has come out in recent times". Y. Maheswara Reddy of Bangalore Mirror gave it 3/5 stars and wrote, "The USP of Mayabazar 2016 is the screenplay and the sterling performances of all the artistes. It does not have more glamour or frightening or scintillating stunts but it never disappoints the audiences." Aravind Shwetha of The News Minute wrote, "The movie banks heavily on comic tonic and the occasional familiar faces. It does a thorough job of entertaining the audience."

== Remake ==
The film was remade same year in Tamil as Naanga Romba Busy (2020).

== Awards and nominations ==
Year	Award	Category	Recipient	Result	Ref.
2021	2nd Chandanavana Film Critics Academy Awards	Best Director	Radhakrishna Reddy	Nominated	
2021	2nd Chandanavana Film Critics Academy Awards	Best Supporting Actor	Achyuth Kumar	Won	
2021	2nd Chandanavana Film Critics Academy Awards	Best Supporting Actor	Vasishta Simha	Nominated	
2021	2nd Chandanavana Film Critics Academy Awards	Best Singer	S. P. Balasubrahmanyam ("Loka Maya Bajaru")	Nominated	
2021	2nd Chandanavana Film Critics Academy Awards	Best Choreographer	A Harsha	Won	
2021	10th South Indian International Movie Awards	Best Actor	Raj B. Shetty	Nominated	
2021	10th South Indian International Movie Awards	Best Supporting Actor	Vasishta Simha	Nominated	
2021	10th South Indian International Movie Awards	Best Actor in a Negative Role	Prakash Raj	Nominated	
2021	10th South Indian International Movie Awards	Best Comedian	Sadhu Kokila	Nominated	
2021	10th South Indian International Movie Awards	Best Debut Director	Radhakrishna Reddy	Won	
