= Nishadh Yusuf =

Indian film editor (1981–2024)

- Born: 9 February 1981; Haripad, Alappuzha
- Died: 30 October 2024 (aged 43); Panampilly Nagar, Kochi, India
- Occupation: Film editor
- Years active: 2011–2024

Nishadh Yusuf (9 February 1981 – 30 October 2024) was an Indian film editor who has worked predominantly in Malayalam and few Tamil films. He won the Kerala State Film Award for Best Editor in 2022 for Thallumaala.

At the time of his death, he had worked on three films (which would become posthumous releases): Alappuzha Gymkhana, Bazooka, and Thudarum.

1001 Nunakal, Chaaver, Saudi Vellakka, Operation Java, Adios Amigo and One are some of his notable works.

== Career ==
Yusuf started his career as an editor at Asianet News channel and later shifted his focus to films.

== Death ==
Yusuf was found dead in his flat at Panampilly Nagar, Kochi on 30 October 2024. He was 43. Police have started the investigation.

== Filmography ==
Year	Title	Notes
2011	Raghuvinte Swantham Rasiya	
2012	22 Female Kottayam	Spot Editing
2013	Dracula 2012	
2019	Ishq	Spot Editing
2019	Unda	Also Acted on a Cameo Role
2021	Operation Java	
2021	Kannalan	
2021	One	
2022	Grandma	
2022	1001 Nunakal	
2022	Thallumaala	Won Kerala State Film Award for Best Editor
2022	Udal	
2022	Saudi Vellakka	
2023	Ramachandra Boss & Co	
2023	Aalankam	
2023	Chaaver	
2024	Exit	
2024	Adios Amigos	
2024	Kanguva	Tamil film
2025	Bazooka	
2025	Alappuzha Gymkhana	
2025	Thudarum	Also did a Cameo Appearance

== Awards ==
=== State Film Awards ===
- 2022 – Kerala State Film Award for Best Editor for Thallumaala
