= Sakutumba Sametha =

Indian Kannada-language romantic film

- Directed by: Rahul PK
- Written by: Rahul PK; Pooja Sudhir
- Produced by: Rakshit Shetty
- Starring: Bharath GB; Siri Ravikumar; Achyuth Kumar
- Cinematography: Karm Chawla; Sandeep Valluri
- Edited by: Bharath MC
- Music by: Midhun Mukundan
- Production company: Paramvah Studios
- Release date: 20 May 2022
- Running time: 107 minutes
- Country: India
- Language: Kannada

Sakutumba Sametha is a 2022 Indian Kannada-language romantic comedy film written and directed by Rahul PK, and produced by Rakshit Shetty under Paramvah Studios. The film stars Bharath G B and Siri Ravikumar with a music score by Midhun Mukundan . It was released in India on 20 May 2022.

== Plot ==
The Movie begins with the introduction of Suresh (Bharath GB) and Shraddha (Siri Ravikumar) who have matched through an online matrimonial site to get married, Shraddha has reservations about going ahead with the wedding, One week before her wedding she chooses to express to her parents and Suresh. A meeting between the two dysfunctional families follows story that takes place in one house, Which gives the opportunity to know each other's family and they get bonded along, some Egos will be hurt, Some hearts will be broken and some hearts will be mended too.

== Cast ==
- Bharath GB as Suri
- Siri Ravikumar as Shraddha
- Achyuth Kumar as Sathyamurthy
- Krishna Hebbale as Giri
- Pushpa Belwadi as Geetha
- Rekha Kudligi as Vimala
- Jayalaxmi Patil as Sathyamurthy's sister
- Gowtham Upadya as Babu
- Shankar Murthy SR

== Home media ==
The film is available to stream on OTT platform Voot from 2 september 2022 while its satellite rights were acquired by Colors Kannada.

== Reception ==
Reviewing Sakutumba Sametha, Sunayana Suresh of The Times of India gave rating of 3 out of 5, praising it as, cinema with soul and simplicity. For The New Indian Express, A.Sharadhaa gave rating of 3 out of 5 and wrote "While the direction deserves applause, equal credit should also go to writer Pooja Sudhir, who captures delightful nuggets about family life. The music by Midhun Mukundan is a plus and goes well with the film, which has each actor playing to their strengths in author-backed roles."
