= Rorschach (film) =

2022 film directed by Nisam Basheer

- Theatrical release poster
- Directed by: Nissam Basheer
- Written by: Sameer Abdul
- Produced by: Mammootty
- Starring: Mammootty; Asif Ali; Sharafudheen; Jagadish; Grace Antony; Mani Shornur; Bindu Panicker; Kottayam Nazeer; Sanju Sivram
- Cinematography: Nimish Ravi
- Edited by: Kiran Das
- Music by: Midhun Mukundan
- Production company: Mammootty Kampany
- Distributed by: Wayfarer Films
- Release date: 7 October 2022
- Running time: 150 minutes
- Country: India
- Language: Malayalam
- Box office: ₹39 crore

Rorschach is a 2022 Indian Malayalam-language psychological thriller directed by Nissam Basheer and produced by Mammootty under Mammootty Kampany. It stars Mammootty in the lead role, alongside Asif Ali, Sharafudheen, Jagadish, Grace Antony, Mani Shornur, Bindu Panicker, Kottayam Nazeer, Sanju Sivram. Its music was composed by Midhun Mukundan, and the cinematography was handled by Nimish Ravi.

The principal photography began on 30 March 2022 at Chalakudy.

Rorschach was released on 7 October 2022 and received positive reviews from critics. The film became a commercial success at the box office.

== Plot ==
Luke Anthony is an NRI businessman in Dubai who goes to Kerala with his pregnant wife, Sofiya, for a vacation. While traveling through the forest, they meet with a road accident. Upon gaining consciousness, Luke finds that Sofiya is missing and reports it to the local police. The cops close the case as they conclude that Sofiya was killed by a tiger. Luke decides to find her on his own and stumbles upon Balan who asks him to purchase his house on the outskirts of the forest. Balan tells Luke that the house was owned by his elder son, Dileep, who died a few months ago in an accident. After selling the house, Balan leaves with the money, abandoning his wife, Seetha, and young son, Anil, for his second family. However, Balan is found murdered and the money missing. When asked by the cops, Seetha and Anil deny knowing anything about the house's sale or the money.

Meanwhile, it is revealed that Sofiya was murdered by Dileep during a house robbery. With no opportunity for revenge, Luke stays there as a semi-retreat. However, Luke starts feeling Dilip's presence in the house and deduces that Dileep's spirit is present there and Seetha's confirmation about the same gives him the vigour for revenge. Luke meets Balan's son-in-law, Shashankan, and suggests they investigate Balan's murder and the missing money. However, Shashankan refuses as he has Balan's money. Shashankan finds his storeroom burnt and the money missing. It is revealed that Luke retrieved the money and set fire to the storeroom. Shashankan reveals his suspicion that Luke was responsible for the incident to Anil. Anil learned about Balan's plan to leave him and Seetha, and he killed him and kept the money in the storeroom on the advice of Shashankan.

At night, Anil and Shashankan break into Luke's house to steal the money. Luke subdues them, but they manage to escape. While escaping, Anil gets into an accident. Luke helps the family with the medical expenses and also convinces Dilip's widow, Sujatha, to agree to transfer Seetha's shares of the cashew nut processing factory and merge their businesses. Sathisan gets suspicious that Luke attacked his girlfriend, Ammu (who is a domestic worker at Luke's house), and tries to kill him. But he learns that Ammu left for her village and Luke compensated her for her friendliness with the money he retrieved from Balan. Luke is admitted to the hospital, where he tries to flirt with Sujatha. Sujatha learns that the skull from Dileep's corpse has been stolen. Luke seeks permission to marry Sujatha from Sujatha's mother who agrees despite Sujatha's appeals.

After the wedding, Seetha seals down Sujatha's factory and Luke plays a key role in it. A head constable named Ashraf starts investigating Luke's past. He learns about Dileep's crimes and the suffering caused by him to Luke with his friend, Shafi. He deduces that Luke came prepared for vengeance, but is now staying there to torture Dileep's family as he cannot get his hands on Dileep who is already dead. Learning about the robbery and that Dileep's family might have money left from robbing Luke, Ashraf demands a hefty bribe from Seetha to not tarnish Dileep's reputation. Seetha kills him by poisoning his drink and makes Anil and Shashankan bury him in the backyard. Sujatha gets fed up with Luke and leaves him. Later, she learns about Dileep's crimes, which makes her hate Dileep and she burns down the factory. Seetha visits Luke and reveals that both Dileep and Anil were following her orders to gain more money by committing crimes.

Luke realizes Seetha should be killed as her sons were just following her orders. Anil and his men head to Luke's house and attack him. Luke kills Anil, and Seetha manages to escape. Sujatha complains to the police about Dileep and Anil. Shashankan reveals Ashraf's murder by the family and is arrested. Seetha is arrested, while Luke surrenders to the police. In the local prison Luke learns that Seetha has committed suicide of her sons' deaths and depression, which makes him happy after learning that he finally avenged Sofiya's death and extinguished Dileep's spiritual presence by destroying all his physical ties and his family forever.

== Cast ==
- Mammootty as Luke Antony
- Asif Ali as Dileep Kumar Balan (extended guest appearance)
- Bindu Panicker as Seetha G Balan, Dileep and Anil's mother
- Sharafudheen as Satheeshan Madathil
- Jagadeesh as Head Constable Ashraf
- Grace Antony as Sujatha, Dileep's widow and Luke Antony's second wife
- Manir Shornur as Balan, Dileep and Anil's father and Seetha's husband
- Kottayam Nazeer as Shashankan, Dileep and Anil's brother-in-law
- Sanju Sivram as Anil Kumar Balan, Dileep's younger brother
- Ira Noor as Sofiya Luke, Luke's wife
- George Abraham as Constable Aby
- Priyamvada Krishnan as Ammu, a Local Prostitute
- Riyas Narmakala as Soman
- Jordi Poonjar as CI John
- Jimmi Joseph as Constable Sini
- Sreeja Ravi as Lekha, Sujatha's mother
- Mohan Raj as Vishvanathan, Sujatha's father
- Zeenath as Ambika Madathil, Satheeshan's mother
- Geethi Sangeetha as Nurse Sini
- Gilu Joseph as Constable Midhuna
- Babu Annur as SI Saji
- Mathew Mampra as Rasheed

== Production ==
=== Development ===
Rorschach is the second directorial of Nissam Basheer, after Kettyolaanu Ente Malakha. The film is produced by Mammootty under the banner Mammootty Kampany, with NM Badusha as co-producer. The story was written by Sameer Abdul. Shaji Naduvil is the art director and Prashanth Narayan is the production controller.

=== Filming ===
Principal photography began on 30 March 2022 at Chalakudy. Mammootty joined the sets on 3 April. After the completion of the shoot in Kerala by mid-June, the team moved to Dubai for the final schedule. On 1 July 2022, the makers announced that filming has been completed.

== Music ==
Midhun Mukundan composed the songs and scores for the film, marking his debut in Malayalam cinema.

== Marketing ==
The global audio launch of the film was held in Doha.

== Release ==
=== Theatrical ===
The film was released on 7 October 2022 in theatres.

=== Home media ===
The digital rights of the film were acquired by Disney+ Hotstar where it started streaming on 11 November 2022. The satellite rights are owned by Asianet.

== Reception ==
=== Box office ===
On its opening day, Rorschach’ has raked in almost ₹2.5 crore (US$260,000) and earned ₹5 crore (US$520,000) gross worldwide, which is the highest rating for a recent Experimental film in Malayalam. After running successfully for 14 days, the film managed to collect a worldwide gross of ₹39 crore (US$4.0 million) of ₹15 crore (US$1.6 million) budget.

=== Critical response ===
Manoj Kumar R of The Indian Express gave the film 4/5, writing that, 'Mammootty magnificently embodies the psychological condition of a man with bottomless vengeance'. The News Minute rated the film 3.5/5, and found the film to be 'dark & interesting', further writing that 'director Nissam puts his powerful women characters in the ordinary garbs of village women, behaving like the typical mother or grieving wife, but exposing their depths when the time comes'. S.R. Praveen of The Hindu found the film to be 'an effective psychological thriller that has its imperfections, just like the test that it draws its name from, but it is nevertheless an intriguing experience'. Soundarya Athimuthu of The Quint wrote, 'deploying a compelling visual-storytelling and oscillating between the past and the present in a smooth fashion, Rorschach promises an immersive experience if you are willing to pay the full-attention it deserves'. Princy Alexander of Onmanorama found the film 'hit all the right notes, except in the end', though she praised Mammootty by writing that 'his movements are swift, the mysterious aura is intact and the dialogues are enough to thrill you thrill you till the end', & adding that his achievement onscreen is 'pure brilliance'. The Times of India rated 4 on 5 and praised the layered screenplay and performances of lead actors.
