= Kaafi Thota =

- Directed by: T. N. Seetharam
- Written by: T. N. Seetharam
- Produced by: Manvantara Chitra.LLP
- Starring: Raghu Mukherjee; Radhika Chetan; Samyukta Hornad; Rahul Madhav
- Cinematography: Ashok Kashyap
- Edited by: Akshay P Rao
- Music by: Anoop Seelin; Midhun Mukundan
- Production company: Manvanthara Chitra
- Release date: 18 August 2017
- Country: India
- Language: Kannada

Kaafi Thota is a 2017 Indian romantic thriller Kannada film written, directed and co-produced by T. N. Seetharam. Adapting a crowd-funding methodology, Seetharam produced the film along with 29 other donors under the maiden banner "Manvanthara Films".

The film stars Raghu Mukherjee, Radhika Chetan and Samyukta Hornad in the lead roles along with Rahul Madhav, B. C. Patil, Achyuth Kumar, Sudha Belawadi and Sundar Raj in key supporting roles. The project marks the comeback of T. N. Seetharam to the big screen after his earlier directorial Meera Madhava Raghava.

== Plot ==
Chami (Rahul Madhav), a travelling musician who is a bit of a wanderlust, arrives at a palatial coffee estate owned by Mythili (Radhika Chetan), ostensibly on vacation. He is fond of Mythili's niece Pranjali, and grows close to the members of her extended family as well, who manage the homestay for Mythili. He conveys his love to Mythili, who is reluctant to accept his proposal, since a failed relationship with her lawyer Niranjan (Raghu Mukherjee) had caused her immense heartbreak in the past. However, despite her misgivings, she agrees to marry Chami.

On a night when the staff members of the homestay are on leave, Mythili is found murdered with trauma injuries to her head. The shadow of suspicion immediately falls upon Chami who was the only person present at the crime scene. Chami implores Niranjan to defend his case, which he does. Niranjan's sound arguments result in Chami being acquitted of the murder charge and him inheriting the estate. However, after examining the evidence, Niranjan soon discovers that Chami had planned and executed several murders to snap up the inheritances of young women who died heirless. He decides to appeal against his own arguments and requests a re-trial. Eyewitness evidence proffered by Pranjali, who was clandestinely present when Chami brutally murdered Mythili clinch the case in the favour of the prosecution. Chami is convicted of murder and sentenced to life imprisonment, while ownership of the estate passes on to Pranjali.

== Cast ==
- Raghu Mukherjee as Niranjan
- Radhika Chetan as Mythili
- Samyukta Hornad as Tanvi
- Rahul Madhav as Chami
- Apeksha Purohit as Inspector Chanchala Kumari
- B. C. Patil as Police Commissioner
- Rajesh Nataranga as Public prosecutor
- Ambika as Judge
- Sudha Belawadi
- Sundar Raj as Chiranjeevi
- T. N. Seetharam
- Veena Sundar as Meera
- Hanumanthegowda
- Krishnamurthy Srinath
- Diganteshwara S

== Soundtrack ==
Kaafi Thota

Soundtrack album by Anoop Seelin
- Recorded: 2017
- Genre: Feature film soundtrack

The original soundtrack for the film is composed by Anoop Seelin and Midhun Mukundan. Both have composed one song each and an additional track is written by Yogaraj Bhat.

Track list
No.	Title	Lyrics	Singer(s)	Length
1.	"Haadadkondiru Odaadkondiru"	Jogi	Anoop Seelin
2.	"Indu Ninna Edurali"	Jayanth Kaikini	Haricharan, Sinchan Dikshit
3.	"Ee Baduku"	Yogaraj Bhat	Yogaraj Bhat

== Reception ==
A critic from The New Indian Express wrote that "Watch this one if Seetharam’s serials have left on you over the years". A critic from The Times of India wrote that "If you like Seetharam's brand of filmmaking, this film could entice you". A critic from The News Minute wrote that "Kaafi Thota has its moments and can be worth a watch. But at the end of the film you’re left wondering just how good it could have turned out in the hands of a slicker, smarter director and cast". A critic from Deccan Chronicle wrote that "Better skip this Kaafi, and if you are a huge fan of T N Seetharam’s work then find an old video of his popular TV serial and watch the court room drama in the serial and it enjoy with a cup of coffee at home..".
