= Thammudu (2025 film) =

2025 Indian Telugu-language film by Venu Sriram

- Theatrical release poster
- Directed by: Venu Sriram
- Written by: Venu Sriram
- Produced by: Dil Raju; Sirish
- Starring: Nithin; Laya; Sapthami Gowda; Varsha Bollamma
- Cinematography: K. V. Guhan; Sameer Reddy; Satyajit Pande (Setu)
- Edited by: Prawin Pudi
- Music by: B. Ajaneesh Loknath
- Production company: Sri Venkateswara Creations
- Release date: 4 July 2025
- Running time: 154 minutes
- Country: India
- Language: Telugu
- Budget: ₹75 crore

Thammudu (transl. Younger brother) is a 2025 Indian Telugu-language survival action drama film written and directed by Venu Sriram and produced by Dil Raju through Sri Venkateswara Creations. The film stars Nithiin, Laya, Sapthami Gowda, and Varsha Bollamma in the lead roles, while Saurabh Sachdeva and Swasika play supporting roles. B. Ajaneesh Loknath composed the soundtrack and score, while K. V. Guhan, Sameer Reddy and Satyajit Pande handled the cinematography, with Prawin Pudi handling the editing.

Shot extensively in Visakhapatnam and Maredumilli of Andhra Pradesh, the film was released on 4 July 2025. The film received mixed-to-negative reviews from critics and was a box-office disaster. It started streaming on Netflix and JioHotstar from 1 August 2025 and 12 September 2025.

== Plot ==
Jai is a skilled archer who aims to win a gold medal at the upcoming 2025 Archery World Cup. However, his coach is dissatisfied with his performance in practice sessions and encourages him to find a solution. Later, with the encouragement of Chitra, an entrepreneur and his best friend and only constant support, Jai realizes his emotional trauma of being separated from his elder sister, Snehalata, who has a motherly bond with him, during childhood. 20 years ago, Snehalata, a woman of her word, loved a man and promised to marry him, but her father opposed her decision. With no other option to keep her promise, she decided to elope with her lover and sent the plan in a letter through her brother, the young Jai. When Jai is about to leave, his father notices the letter and fears that his son will give it to him. He becomes angry and marries Snehalata off to another person. After the marriage, Snehalata got to know that her lover had committed suicide for not marrying her, and she became angry at her father and later disowned them.

Jai and Chitra trace Snehalata to Hyderabad and realize she became an IAS and changed her identity to Jhansi Kiranmayi. Jhansi is now a principled government officer who refuses to sign off on a falsified report related to a chemical factory explosion in Vizag. She promises herself to get justice for the victims in the blast. Her decision places her and her family in danger from Agarwal, a powerful and corrupt industrialist. Agarwal has phonophobia and hyperacusis and cannot bear to hear any sound greater than 20 decibels.

A tribal festival called "Pagadalamma Jatara" comes once every 12 years in the remote Ambaragodugu forest region near the Andhra–Odisha border. It is a lawless land known for ruthless decoits, where Jhansi and her family take the Darshan. There, Agarwal orchestrates a violent attack on Jhansi's family. Jai, in search of his sister, reaches the location and reunites with her. As the night unfolds, he takes on the responsibility of defending his sister and her loved ones against multiple waves of assaults. Utilizing his archery skills and driven by a desire for redemption and familial love, Jai confronts the attackers in a survival battle that tests his endurance and moral resolve. En route, they try to cross Ambaragodugu. After talking with Jhansi, Chitra and Jai understand that Jhansi lost her word once and considers it her new life. Jhansi declares that she is not Snehalata: she considers her past dead. Respecting her thoughts, the duo decides not to reveal their identity to her. Jai decides to protect Jhansi and her family, and the duo guards them from Agarwal's threats.

Meanwhile, Francis, a subordinate to Agarwal, had several failed attempts to kill Jhansi and her family. Agarwal announced a bounty of Rs. 1 crore to Ambaragodugu for killing them. To escape, Jai tries contacting the emergency numbers in the forest region. There, he reaches out to an emergency call center girl called Ratna. The center is run by an NGO, and she helps customers in emergencies through the calls. Being kindhearted, she decides to guide them out of the Ambaragodugu forest. There, she suggests taking help from Gutti, a ferocious but greedy woman, to escape from the forest.

Unaware of the facts, Gutti decides to help them, taking it as an opportunity to loot them. Meanwhile, there they face Basawa, the head of the dacoits in the forest, who responds to the bounty, tries violently to kill them all, and damages Gutti's vehicle. The family leaves. At the same time, one of Jhansi's sisters-in-law suffers labor pains en route. In a hard struggle, Jai saves them from Basawa, and she gives birth to a baby girl with the help of Jhansi, Chitra, Jhansi's only child Divya, and Ratna through a call. Later, with the family's gratitude, Jhansi asks Ratna to suggest a name for the baby girl. Ratna names her Chamundeswari and receives a silent admiration from Jai.

Later, the family escapes from Basawa's men with a boat near a lake. After crossing the lake, Jhansi realizes that Divya has been missing in the frenzy. Jai decides to return for his niece and tasks Chitra with saving them until the border. It is revealed that Divya is stuck in a hollow used for hunting deer. Basawa finds her and is about to kill her, but Jai comes to her rescue, bashes Basawa, and successfully escapes along with his niece. In the process, he reveals he is her maternal uncle and takes a promise from Divya not to reveal it.

Meanwhile, knowing about the bounty, Gutti makes a deal with Francis to kill them all by herself and give a tip about Ratna. Later, she reaches them by falsely rescuing them and spots them in a den. There, Chitra fights with Gutti; in a hard struggle, Chitra kills Gutti but gets injured during the fight and succumbs to her own wounds. She dies in Jai's arms after declaring that her life's purpose has been fulfilled by dying for him. It is revealed that Jai had protected her from an abusive childhood at the age of seven. From then on, Chitra became an obedient and trusted friend to him, leaving Jai devastated.

Later, Jai and his family bury Chitra's body and head towards the border. Meanwhile, Ratna is under attack by Francis's men. They destroy her call center, disconnecting Jai. Ratna kills them all and starts to meet Jai and his family to protect them in person. Jai and his family are about to cross a deadly bridge, the only exit route in Ambaragodugu, which has not been used much by the public. After crossing the bridge and leaving the forest, the police force waits for them for security from Agarwal. When they cross the bridge, Francis attacks them with landmines. Jai kills Francis with his archery skills and successfully escapes the bridge. While killing Francis, he realizes that he has overcome his trauma, and the family knows through Divya that Jai is Jhansi's younger brother. Then, Basawa finds them crossing the bridge and is about to shoot an arrow, but suddenly, Ratna stabs him from behind and kills him. She then chose to go back instead of following them.

Everyone successfully reaches the police force and gets treatment for Jhansi, whom Francis severely stabbed before dying. Then, Jhansi, instead of going for treatment, stands to protect justice; she decides to share her reports in the Collectorate of Vizag. The commissioner reveals that Vizag is completely hijacked by Agarwal's private army, who are on a hunt to kill them, and he was handcuffed by the corrupt politicians to not interfere. Jai diverts his men towards him and reaches Agarwal's house, where Agarwal meets him in person with the help of a soundproof box and declares that it is his idea to separate him from his family, and no one can protect them. Observing Agarwal's situation, Jai breaks the latter's shield, takes him hostage, and stops all the people who are trying to kill Jhansi. Later, the wounded Jhansi successfully submits the report on time, and Jai releases Agarwal from his soundproof shield in front of the victims of his factory blast. Agarwal cannot bear any sound and dies due to ruptured eardrums.

Finally, the film ends with the victims getting justice and the government taking over Agarwal's properties. Finally, Jhansi declares that Jai is her god-gifted brother and fulfills his wish. In a mid-credits scene, Jai wins a gold medal, pays his last rites to Chitra on her headstone, and declares his love towards Ratna.

== Cast ==
- Nithiin as Jai, an Archer
- Laya as Jhansi Kiranmayee IAS aka Snehalata, Jai’s sister
- Sapthami Gowda as Ratna, SOS call attendant and Jai’s love-interest
- Varsha Bollamma as Chitra, Entrepreneur and Jai’s bestfriend
- Saurabh Sachdeva as Azarwal, Phonophobic Industrialist (Aggarwal in Hindi Version)
- Swasika as Gutti, Bus driver
- Srikanth Iyengar as Shiva, Azarwal’s Personal Assistant
- Naga Mahesh Vaddi as Minister Mahendra Varma
- Temper Vamsi Krishna as Francis, Azarwal’s henchman
- Hari Teja as Tejamma
- Ravi Bhatt as Police Officer
- Uday Mahesh as Jai’s archery coach
- Cheluvaraj as Basawa/Murugan, Dacoit and Contract Killer
- Chammak Chandra as Narasaiah, Ratna’s fiancee
- Sreedhar Reddy Nalla
- Raja Sridhar as Jhansi’s husband
- Vachaspathi Ambadipudi Muralikrishna as Jhansi’s father-in-law
- Reddi Bhanu Prasad as Sekhar
- Balagam Sanjay Krishna as Dinesh
- Rohit Addanki as Ganesh
- Shanthi Devagudi
- Vamsi Raghava Yenumula as Jeevan
- Sharath Barigela as Goli
- Kishore Raju Vasistha as Ravi

== Production ==
The film was produced by Dil Raju and Sireesh under the banner of Sri Venkateswara Creations. The production house is known for backing several major Telugu-language films. Thammudu marks another collaboration between the producers and actor Nithiin.

== Music ==
Thammudu

Soundtrack album by B. Ajaneesh Loknath
- Released: 2025
- Recorded: 2025
- Studio: Annapurna Studios
- Genre: Soundtrack
- Length: 14:54
- Label: T-Series
- Producer: B. Ajaneesh Loknath

B. Ajaneesh Loknath chronology
Odela 2 (2025)	Thammudu (2025)	Devil: The Hero (2025)

The music is composed by B. Ajaneesh Loknath. The soundtrack album was released on 4 July 2024 through T-Series.

No.	Title	Lyrics	Singer(s)	Length
1.	"Bhuu Antuu Bhuutham"	Simhachalam Mannela	Anurag Kulkarni, Akshitha Pola	3:25
2.	"Jai Bagalaamukhii"	Jonnavittula Ramalingeswara Rao	Abby V	4:18
3.	"Chillax Song"	Kasarla Shyam	Nakash Aziz	2:46
4.	"Slokam"	Traditional	Aniruddha Sastry	2:21
5.	"Mood Of Thammudu"			1:50
Total length:				14:54

== Release ==
Thammudu was released in cinemas on 4 July 2025. It received an 'A' certificate from CBFC owing to its some sequences of intense violence. According to Dil Raju, the censor board suggested the makers to make cuts to secure 'U/A' certificate but they refused as they felt it may lessen the impact thus the makers accepted the A certificate.

Post-theatrical digital streaming rights were acquired by Netflix and JioHotstar and was released on 1 August 2025 and 12 September 2025.

== Reception ==
Thammudu received mixed-to-negative reviews from critics who praised Nithiin's performance, background score and action sequences but criticized the screenplay, writing and lack of emotional depth.

Sangeetha Devi Dundoo of The Hindu opined it as a failed execution and wrote that, "On paper, Thammudu might have seemed like a gripping watch —blending complex family dynamics, childhood friendship, and a good-versus-evil survival thriller. But in execution, it is more of an endurance test than an immersive film". BVS Prakash of Deccan Chronicle rated it 1 out of 5 and was negative towards the bland storytelling and weak direction. Calling it a "misfire", The Hollywood Reporter India opined that the weak writing has effected the film. In a similar tone, T Maruthi Acharya of India Today stated that the film, "losing its core and venturing into random action scenes, becomes its biggest issue".
