= Bachelor Party (2024 film) =

2024 Kannada-language comedy film

- Theatrical release poster
- Directed by: Abhijit Mahesh
- Written by: Abhijit Mahesh
- Dialogues by: Abhijit Mahesh; Veeresh Shivamurthy; Ganesh Vasishta
- Produced by: G. S. Gupta; Rakshit Shetty, Rajesh S Konanur, Sourabh A K (Executive Producers)
- Starring: Diganth Manchale; Yogesh; Achyuth Kumar; Siri Ravikumar; Achara Kirk
- Cinematography: Arvind S. Kashyap
- Edited by: Abhishek M.
- Music by: Arjun Ramu
- Production company: Paramvah Studios
- Release date: 26 January 2024
- Running time: 145 minutes
- Country: India
- Language: Kannada
- Box office: ₹1.58 crores

Bachelor Party is a 2024 Indian Kannada-language comedy film written and directed by Abhijit Mahesh and produced by Rakshit Shetty under Paramvah Studios. It stars Diganth Manchale, Yogesh and Achyuth Kumar in the lead roles. The music was composed by Arjun Ramu, while the cinematography and editing were handled by Arvind S Kashyap and Abhishek M.

Bachelor Party was theatrically released on 26 January 2024, coinciding with Republic Day to mixed reviews from critics.

== Plot ==
Santosh, a software engineer, lives an unhappy life without any promotion from his office due to his female colleague and constant nagging from his obnoxious wife Sandhya. Santhosh secretly attends his friend Ashok's bachelor party, where he meets his trouble-making childhood friend Madhav alias "Maddy" and his PT teacher Ashwath Narayan. The party begins and all of them ends up drunk.

The next morning, Santhosh, along with Maddy and Ashwath, finds himself in Bangkok and soon learns that he is the one who took Maddy and Ashwath to Bangkok in a drunken state. The trio roam around Bangkok and have a happy trip, but Santhosh is in for a shock as he learns that Sandhya is having an affair with another person and she has arrived in Bangkok for a trip. The trio sets out to embark on a journey to find Sandhya.

However, they are unknowingly captured by Prakash Anna as he assumed the trio are Indian police officers because of Maddy (Maddy introduced himself, Santhosh and Ashwath as police officers to find Sandhya at the hotel), but Prakash lets them go and secretly sends stickers, which actually contains "Blue Sky", a costly drug in Bangkok, to deliver it to his brother-in-law Mahabala. A misadventure ensues for the trio and Maddy meets and falls for Achara, a single mother, and also meets her son Navin.

The trio gives the bag to Mahabala's assistant and leaves. However, Mahabala finds jackfruits instead of stickers missing as Maddy gave the stickers to Navin in order to make him happy. Mahabala captures Prakash and the trio, when they try to meet Sandhya at her friend's wedding, and demands to find Navin and retrieve the stickers.

Various comedic events ensue in which Mahabala begins a shootout to finish his rival Marchello at the wedding. Maddy earns Achara's trust by saving Navin from the shootout. Mahabala finishes Marchello with unexpected help from Ashwath. Santhosh scolds Sandhya and breaks up with her. In the aftermath, Maddy marries Achara, Santhosh falls in love with Asha (who is revealed to be Santhosh's childhood crush) and Ashwath talks to his son after a long time.

== Cast ==
- Diganth Manchale as Santhosh
- Yogesh as Madhav aka "Maddy"
- Achyuth Kumar as P.T. Master Ashwath Narayan
- Siri Ravikumar as Sandhya
- Balaji Manohar as Mahabala
- Achara Kirk as Achara
- Prakash Thuminad as Prakash Anna
- Pawan Kumar as Lobo Griffin
- Sowmya Jaganmurthy as Lobo's wife
- Shobaraj as Inspector KD Shobaraj
- Shwetha Srinivas as housekeeper Nagamma
- Sudha Belawadi as Ashwath Narayan's wife
- Jayalakshmi Patil as Sandhya's mother
- Gaana Bhat as Pratibha, Maddy's ex
- Nitin Krishnamurthy as Ashwath Narayan's son (special appearance)
- Jaby Koay as himself (special appearance)
- Guruprasad as TV Guru (special appearance)
- Abhijit Mahesh as Sandhya's boyfriend
- Aindrita Rai as grown up Asha (special appearance)
- Shine Shetty as Ashok (cameo appearance)

== Production ==
Initially Diganth, Achyuth Kumar and Rishab Shetty were roped in to play the leading roles, but Rishab was replaced with Yogesh, due to the latter's commitments for Kantara: Chapter 1.

== Soundtrack ==
Bachelor Party

Soundtrack album by Arjun Ramu
- Released: 2024
- Recorded: 2023
- Genre: Soundtrack
- Length: 15:24
- Label: Paramvah Music

Singles from Bachelor Party
- 1. "Warning Song" Released: 31 December 2023

Arjun Ramu composed the soundtrack and background score.

track listing
No.	Title	Lyrics	Singer(s)	Length
1.	"Warning Song"	Abhijit Mahesh, Veeresh Shivamurthy	Vijay Prakash, Abhishek M R, Madhwesh Bharadwaj, Darshan Narayan, Narahari Achar	04:21
2.	"The Uncle Song"	Nagarjun Sharma	Praveen Biligiri, Abhishek M R, Madhwesh Bharadwaj, Vishak Nagalapura, Gagan Puranik	03:28
3.	"Nenapirali"	Chandrajith Beliyappa	Akshath Acharya, Abhishek M R, Madhwesh Bharadwaj, Darshan Narayan, Narahari Achar	04:18
4.	"Paapa Santhosha"	Veeresh Shivamurthy	Vijay Prakash, Abhishek M R, Madhwesh Bharadwaj, Darshan Narayan, Narahari Achar	03:17
Total length:				15:24

== Release ==
=== Theatrical ===
The film was released theatrically across Karnataka on 26 January 2024 coinciding India's Republic day.

=== Home media ===
The film's digital rights were picked up by Amazon Prime Video and was available for digital streaming from 4 March 2024.

== Controversies ==
A plagiarism controversy started when MRT Music, a music label, accused Rakshit Shetty and Paramvah Studios of using 2 songs "Nyaya Ellide" and "Omme Ninannu Kantumbha" from Nyaya Ellide (1982) and Gaalimaathu (1981) films respectively in this movie without permission. Naveen Kumar, partner of MRT Music, filed a complaint, highlighting that the music was used without proper licence, leading to a copyright infringement case against Rakshit Shetty.

As per a report by Pinkvilla the Delhi High Court took note of the situation and issued a notice to Rakshit Shetty and Paramvah Studios after they failed to appear in court. The court also ordered the immediate removal of the social media post in which the production house had defended its actions. The court's ruling on 12 August 2024, was clear: Rakshit Shetty and Paramvah Studios must pay Rs 20 lakh as compensation to MRT Music for the unauthorized use of their songs.
