= Sapthami Gowda =

Indian actress

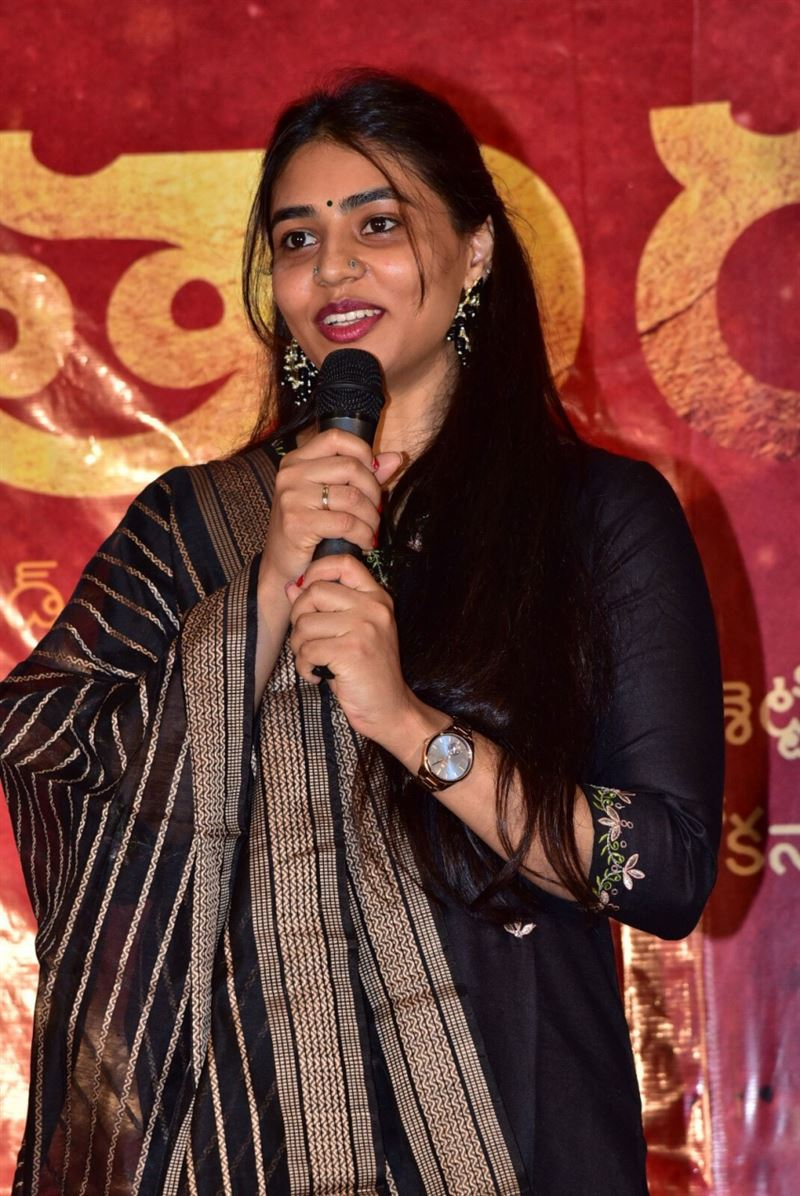
- Gowda at Kantara success meet
- Born: Sapthami Gowda; 8 June 1996 (age 30); Bengaluru, Karnataka, India
- Education: B.Tech.
- Occupation: Actress
- Years active: 2020–present
- Parent: S. K. Umesh (father)

Sapthami Gowda (born 8 June 1996) is an Indian actress who works primarily in Kannada cinema. She made her acting debut with the 2020 film Popcorn Monkey Tiger directed by Duniya Suri and is known for her role of Leela in Kantara, directed by Rishab Shetty in 2022. She is a recipient of a Filmfare Award South and two SIIMA Awards.

== Early life ==
Sapthami was born in Bengaluru, Karnataka, to Inspector S. K. Umesh Gowda and Shanta Gowda. She studied at Baldwin Girls' High School and at Sri Kumaran Composite Junior College in Bengaluru. She then completed her graduation in Civil Engineering from the Bangalore Institute of Technology. She is trained in swimming and has won several medals.

== Career ==
Sapthami Gowda made her acting debut in the 2020 Kannada movie Popcorn Monkey Tiger directed by Duniya suri co-starring Dhananjaya which opened to mixed reviews from audience. She then was seen playing the role of Leela in the Blockbuster movie Kantara which brought her into the limelight and was praised for essaying the role of village girl. She was next seen in Yuva directed by Santhosh Ananddram co-starring debutant Yuva Rajkumar (son of Raghavendra Rajkumar). Initial talks are in place that she might be a potential heroine in the upcoming movie Kaali directed by S. Krishna alongside Abhishek Ambareesh.

She made her Hindi cinema debut through the 2023 movie The Vaccine War directed by Vivek Agnihotri. The movie opened to mixed reviews and her role had a minimal scope but yet was given the appropriate appreciation. Sapthami will be making her debut in Telugu cinema opposite Nithin in the film Thamuudu directed by Venu Sriram.

== Other work ==
She has been appointed as the ambassador of the Karnataka Government's "Nanna Maithri" scheme which enables distribution of menstrual cups to adolescent girls across Karnataka. She was also appointed as Brand ambassador for the 3rd T-20 World Cup edition of the Blind cricket 2022, organized by the Samarthanam Trust for blind, a non-profit working to empower those with disabilities.

== Filmography ==
=== Films ===
Key
†	Denotes films that have not yet been released

- All films are in Kannada, unless otherwise noted.

Year	Title	Role	Language	Notes	Ref.
2020	Popcorn Monkey Tiger	Girija	Kannada	Debut film	
2022	Kantara	Leela	Kannada		
2023	The Vaccine War	Dr. Sreelakshmy Mohandas	Hindi	Hindi Debut	
2024	Yuva	Siri	Kannada		
2025	Thammudu	Ratna	Telugu	Telugu Debut	
2025	Shodha	Devika	Kannada	Web series	
2026	The Rise of Ashoka	Ambika	Kannada		
2027	Ugrayudham †	TBA	Kannada	Filming	
2027	Halagali †	TBA	Kannada	Filming	

== Awards and nominations ==
Year	Award	Category	Film	Result	Ref.
2020	South Indian International Movie Awards	Best Female Debut – Kannada	Popcorn Monkey Tiger	Won	
2023	South Indian International Movie Awards	Best Actress – Kannada	Kantara	Nominated	
2023	South Indian International Movie Awards	Best Actress Critics – Kannada	Kantara	Won	
2023	Filmfare Awards South	Critics Best Actress – Kannada	Kantara	Won	
2023	Filmfare Awards South	Best Actress - Kannada	Kantara	Nominated	
