= Bisi-Bisi Ice-Cream =

Indian drama film

- Theatrical release poster
- Directed by: Arvind Sastry
- Written by: Arvind Sastry
- Produced by: Akshara Bharadwaj
- Starring: Aravind Iyer; Siri Ravikumar; Gopalkrishna Deshpande
- Cinematography: Enosh Olivera
- Edited by: Arvind Sastry
- Music by: Nakul Abhyankar
- Production company: Boiled Beans Pictures
- Release date: 5 July 2024
- Running time: 132 minutes
- Country: India
- Language: Kannada

Bisi-Bisi Ice-Cream (transl. Super-Hot Ice-Cream) is a 2024 Indian Kannada-language drama film written and directed by Arvind Sastry. Produced by Akshara Bharadwaj under Boiled Beans Pictures, and starring Aravind Iyer, Siri Ravikumar and Gopalkrishna Deshpande.

The film was announced in January 2024. It was theatrically released on 5 July 2024.

== Cast ==
- Aravind Iyer as Raghav
- Siri Ravikumar
- Gopalkrishna Deshpande as Mahantesh

== Production ==
The principal photography of the film concluded in 2024.

== Soundtrack ==
Bisi-Bisi Ice-Cream

Soundtrack album by Nakul Abhyankar
- Released: 25 January 2024
- Genre: Film soundtrack
- Length: 6:48
- Language: Kannada

The soundtrack album of the film was composed by Nakul Abhyankar.

Kannada
No.	Title	Lyrics	Singer(s)	Length
1.	"Ujjadbitlu"	Arvind Sastry	Ramesh Kurubagatti, Ram Hadpad	3:26
2.	"Kuthoohala"	Jayant Kaikini	Nakul Abhyankar	3:22

== Reception ==
Pranati A S from Deccan Herald gave the film a rating of 3.5/5 stars. Vivek M.V. for The Hindu reviewed the film.
