= Hope (2022 film) =

- Directed by: Ambarish M
- Written by: Varsha Sanjeev
- Produced by: Varsha Sanjeev
- Starring: Shwetha Srivatsav; Prakash Belawadi; Pramod Shetty
- Music by: Rithvik Muralidhar
- Production company: Goldie Productions
- Release date: 8 July 2022
- Running time: 141 minutes
- Country: India
- Language: Kannada

Hope is a 2022 Indian Kannada-language legal-drama film written by Ambarish M and Varsha Sanjeev and directed by Ambarish M. The film was produced by Varsha Sanjeev under the Goldie Productions banner. It stars Shwetha Srivatsav in the lead alongside Sumalatha Ambareesh, Pramod Shetty, and Prakash Belawadi in the supporting cast. The music was composed by Rithvik Muralidhar.

Hope was released on 8 July 2022 and received mixed to positive reviews from critics.

== Plot ==
Shivani a Govt official at NHAI gets transferred prematurely in favour of another corrupt officer Varadaraj who eyes her post. Challenging this transfer order Shivani approaches KAT court. The plight of the Govt officials and how independent the Judiciary is will make you wonder if she will get justice or not.

== Cast ==
- Shwetha Srivatsav as Shivani
- Sumalatha Ambareesh as Sulakshana Amarnath
- Prakash Belawadi as Vijayasimha
- Pramod Shetty as Varadaraja
- Aruna Balraj as Shruthi's Mother
- Gopalakrishna Deshpande as Shivshankar
- Radhakrishna Urala
- Vishal Hegde as Dev
- Ashwin Hasan as Bhupathi
- Nagabhushana as Somu
- Sindhu Srinivasamurthy as Shruthi
- Siri Ravikumar as Priya
- Aradhya N Chandra as Ananya
- Uma Hebbar as Nanjappa's wife
- Chethan Poojari

== Release ==
Hope was released on 8 July 2022.

=== Critical response ===
Sunayana Suresh of The Times of India gave 3 out of 5 stars and wrote "The film tries to bring to light not just the main topic of premature transfers, but also the plight of poor farmers who lose their land to development projects, the corruption prevalent in the system and the many layers of the same. The film has many topics being covered, and it seems at times as the scriptwriters have bitten more than they can chew, but eventually, the film does end up being an earnest attempt. Good casting is one of the highlights. Shwetha Srivatsav leads the brigade with a solid performance. Gopalkrishna Deshpande, Pramod Shetty, Prakash Belawadi, Vishal Hegde, Ashwin Hassan and Sumalatha Ambareesh do justice to their casting".
