= Ashu Bedra =

Indian film producer & actor

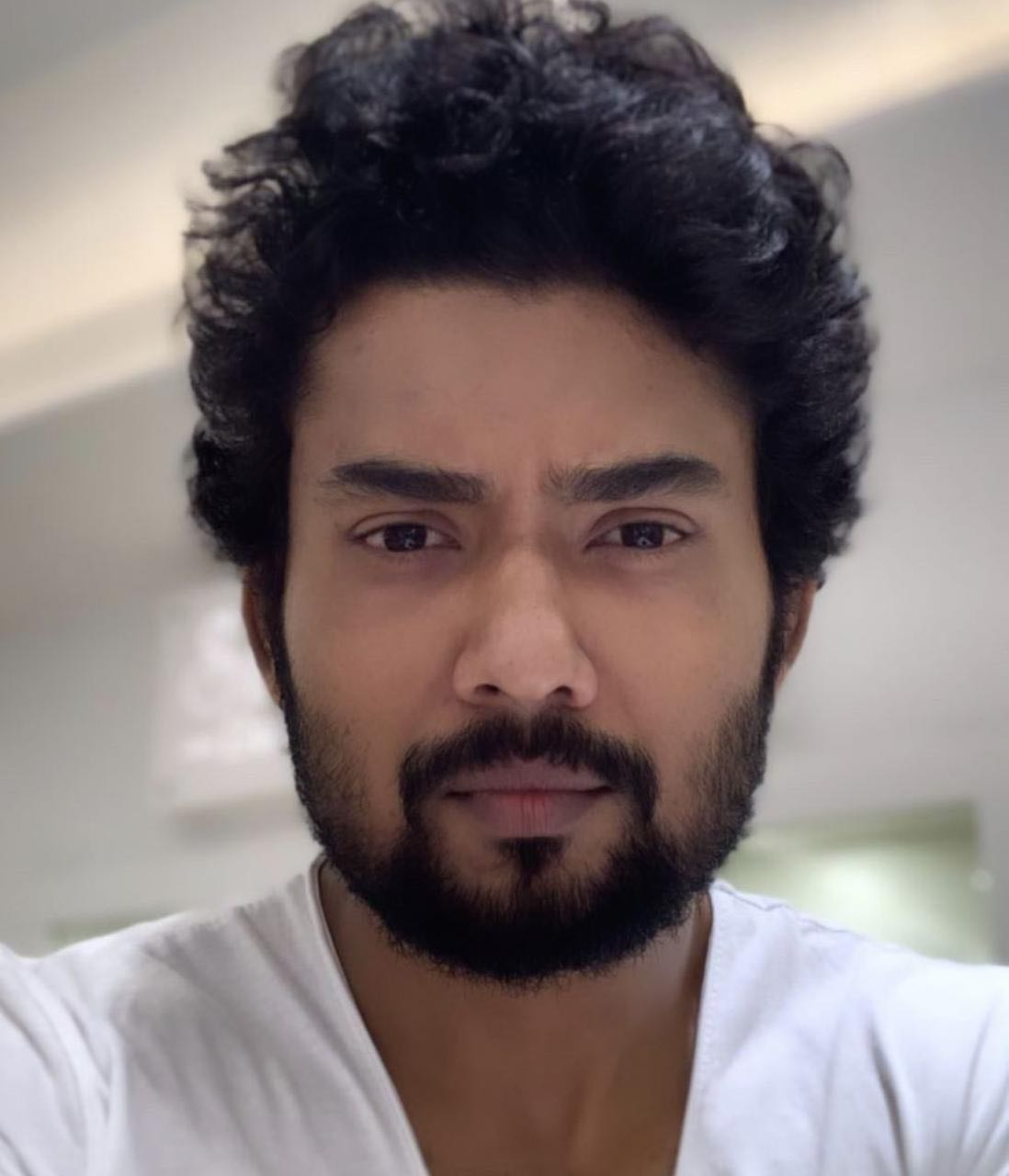
- Born: Uppinangady, Dakshina Kannada, Karnataka
- Occupation(s): Producer, Actor
- Years active: 2008–present

Ashu Bedra is an Indian producer and actor who works in Kannada television and films. He started his career with production as a Kannada TV serial producer in 2008 with Zee Kannada's Radha Kalyana.

== Career ==
Ashu has been a producer for multiple Kannada TV serials like Radha Kalyana (2008), Baduku Jataka Bandi (2011), Sagara Sangama (2014), Sarpa Sambandha (2017), and Oggarane Dabbi (2018).

In 2016, Ashu stepped into the Kannada film industry with Simple Suni directed Simpallag Innondh Love Story, a sequel to Simple Agi Ondh Love Story. Since then, he was involved in major TV serials as a producer. In 2019, he did a lead role in the movie Alidu Ulidavaru.

== Filmography ==
| Year | Title | Producer | Actor | Role | Notes |
|---|---|---|---|---|---|
| 2016 | Simpallag Innondh Love Story | Yes | No | — | |
| 2019 | Alidu Ulidavaru | Yes | Yes | Sheelam | |

=== Television ===
As producer

| Year | Title | Notes |
|---|---|---|
| 2008 | Radha Kalyana | |
| 2011 | Baduku Jataka Bandi | |
| 2014 | Sagara Sangama | |
| 2017 | Sarpa Sambandha | |
| 2018 | Oggarane Dabbi | |
