= Swathi Mutthina Male Haniye =

- Theatrical release poster
- Directed by: Raj B. Shetty
- Written by: Raj B. Shetty
- Produced by: Ramya; Ravi Rai Kalasa; Vachan Shetty
- Starring: Raj B. Shetty; Siri Ravikumar
- Cinematography: Praveen Shriyan
- Edited by: Praveen Shriyan; Raj B. Shetty
- Music by: Midhun Mukundan
- Production companies: Lighter Buddha Films; AppleBox Studios
- Distributed by: KRG Studios
- Release date: 24 November 2023
- Running time: 101 minutes
- Country: India
- Language: Kannada

Swathi Mutthina Male Haniye is a 2023 Indian Kannada-language romantic drama film written and directed by actor-director Raj B. Shetty. It was co-produced by actress Ramya under her home production studio, AppleBox Studios, in collaboration with Shetty's Lighter Buddha Films. It featured Raj B. Shetty and Siri Ravikumar in the lead roles. The music is scored by Midhun Mukundan. Both editing and cinematography are done by Praveen Shriyan.

The film is set in Ooty and Mysore locations and the filming was completed in a single schedule of just 18 days. It opened to critical acclaim, with the writing, performances, music, and cinematography receiving unanimous praise. However the movie ran only for a few weeks in the theatres.

== Plot ==
A hospice counsellor, Prerana, finds a new meaning in her life when she befriends Aniketh, a terminally ill patient. Their bond challenges the conventional notions of love, life and humanity

== Cast ==
- Raj B. Shetty as Aniketh
- Siri Ravikumar as Prerana
- Balaji Manohar as Dr. Manmohan
- Surya Vasishta as Sagar
- Rekha Kudligi as Prerna's mother
- Sneha Sharma as Asha
- J. P. Thuminad as Prabhakar
- Gopalkrishna Deshpande
- Sharadha G S

== Production ==
=== Title row ===
Director Rajendra Singh Babu had filed a case under the Intellectual Property Rights, stating that he solely owned the title of the film, which was the starting lines of his film Bannada Gejje (1990), and no other party could use it without his prior permission. Also, he claimed that he had made an unfinished film with the same title starring Ambarish and Suhasini Maniratnam. However the court ruled out the case and came in favor of Ramya's decision to proceed with the title.

=== Casting ===
The film was initially slated to be a comeback film for actress Ramya. However she later opted out of the film but still remained as the producer for the film. Later, RJ-turned-actor Siri Ravikumar was cast in the role.

== Soundtrack ==
Midhun Mukundan composed the background score for the film and the soundtrack. The single "Mellage" written by Prithvi bhat and sung by Madhuri Sheshadri was released on 7 November 2023. Midhun Mukundan in his interview has told that "Swathi Mutthina Male Haniye is one of my best works to date"

No.	Title	Lyrics	Singer(s)	Length
1.	"Mellage"	Prithvi	Madhuri Seshadri

== Release and reception ==
The film was initially planned to be direct OTT release; however after discussions it was released in limited screens on 24 November 2023.

The movie received positive reviews from critics with praises for all the departments of the team.

Subha J Rao of The News Minute rated the movie 4/5 and stated "Raj B Shetty helms a film he can be proud of". Shashiprasad S. M. of The South First described the movie as "An ordinary tale of love, loss, and life that is simply extraordinary" and rated 4/5. Prathiba Joy of OTTplay in her review wrote "Raj B Shetty crafts a film that is to be enjoyed like a fine drink; one slow sip at a time". Suhasini Srihari of Deccan Herald rated the movie 3.5/5 and described the movie as "A gentle-paced narrative on death" with praise for all the artists and the cinematographer and Music department. Sridevi S of The Times of India in her review stated that "The movie, which travels at a pace slower than usual, makes us rethink and celebrate the joy of living, while also pushing us to happily think about death, and life of the loved ones after death"

On the contrary, Vivek MV of The Hindu described "Swathi Mutthina Male Haniye has a lot of touching moments and offers a distinctive experience, but it fails to amp up the drama between the leads. A Sharadhaa of The New Indian Express in her review stated that the movie is "A beautiful tale of simple emotions and human connections" and added that "a film like Swathi Mutthina Male Haniye, while connecting universally, isn’t tailored for everyone; its appeal lies particularly with those who cherish simple emotions and value the depth of human connections."
