= Midhun Mukundan =

Indian film score composer

- Born: Doha, Qatar
- Genres: Film score; Filmi
- Occupations: Music producer; music director
- Years active: 2016–present

Midhun Mukundan is an Indian music composer and singer who works predominantly in Kannada cinema and Malayalam cinema. His film music career began with the 2016 Kannada film Kahi. His other notable works include Ondu Motteya Kathe (2017), Garuda Gamana Vrishabha Vahana (2021) and Rorschach (2022).

== Early life ==
Midhun was born in Doha to a Malayali family and raised there. He earned his MBBS from A J Institute of Medical Science, Mangalore, Karnataka, and later switched his profession to music, following his passion.

== Career ==
Midhun began his film career through Arvind Sastry's directorial Kahi released in 2016. The film took one and a half year to release and Midhun's score was generally appreciated after release. Reviewer from The News Minute wrote "The genre-bending soundtrack composed by Midhun Mukundan, in particular, marks itself off as one of the stars of the show, setting and unsettling moods with equal rapidity". Even before the release of Kahi, Midhun met filmmaker and actor Raj B. Shetty who was looking out for a newcomer for his film Ondu Motteya Kathe (2017). The music was widely recognized and appreciated upon release. His other works in 2017 include Srinivasa Kalyana followed by a single track score for the film Kaafi Thota. The soundtrack of "Ondu Motteya Kathe" was well received and marked the beginning of Midhun's association with director-actor Raj

Following the success of Ondu Motteya Kathe, Midhun went on to compose for five films in 2019 including Sarvajanikarige Suvarnavakasha and D/O Parvathamma. In 2020, he composed for the PRK Productions and Raj B. Shetty starrer comedy film Mayabazar 2016 which had a song recorded by popular playback singer S. P. Balasubrahmanyam and featured Puneeth Rajkumar.

Midhun's biggest breakthrough came with Raj B. Shetty and Rishab Shetty starrer gangster film Garuda Gamana Vrishabha Vahana (GGVV)(2021). The soundtrack won him Best Music Director nomination at the SIIMA Awards. Midhun went on to say that working for this film was his most creatively satisfying project in his career. Impressed by his work in the film GGVV, Malayalam director Nissam Basheer signed him for his psychological thriller film Rorschach (2022) starring Mammootty in the lead role. This marked the Malayalam film score debut of Midhun. In the same year, Midhun worked on some Kannada films such as Sakutumba Sametha, Dasara and Ramanu Kaadige Hodanu.

In 2023, Midhun collaborated with Raj B. Shetty the third time with the film Toby. His other releases include Poovan and Ramachandra Boss & Co both in Malayalam and Swathi Mutthina Male Haniye in Kannada. He debuted in Telugu cinema by composing a single song for the film Kota Bommali PS.

== Discography ==
=== As music composer ===
Year	Film	Language	Songs	Score	Notes
2016	Kahi	Kannada	Yes	Yes	Debut
2017	Srinivasa Kalyana	Kannada	Yes	Yes	
2017	Ondu Motteya Kathe	Kannada	Yes	Yes	
2017	Kaafi Thota	Kannada	Yes	No	Only 1 song: "Indu Ninna Edurali"
2019	Sarvajanikarige Suvarnavakasha	Kannada	Yes	Yes	
2019	Mahira	Kannada	Yes	Yes	
2019	Lambodara	Kannada	Yes	Yes	
2019	D/O Parvathamma	Kannada	Yes	Yes	
2019	Alidu Ulidavaru	Kannada	Yes	Yes	
2020	Mayabazar 2016	Kannada	Yes	Yes	
2021	Garuda Gamana Vrishabha Vahana	Kannada	Yes	Yes	Nominated - SIIMA Award for Best Music Director
2022	Sakutumba Sametha	Kannada	Yes	Yes	
2022	Rorschach	Malayalam	Yes	Yes	
2022	Ramanu Kaadige Hodanu	Kannada	Yes	Yes	
2022	Dasara	Kannada	Yes	Yes	
2023	Toby	Kannada	Yes	Yes	
2023	Poovan	Malayalam	Yes	Yes	
2023	Ramachandra Boss & Co	Malayalam	Yes	Yes	
2023	Swathi Mutthina Male Haniye	Kannada	Yes	Yes	
2023	Kota Bommali PS	Telugu	Yes	No	Only 1 song: "Lingi Lingi Lingidi"
2023	Mithya	Kannada	Yes	Yes	
2024	Abraham Ozler	Malayalam	Yes	Yes	
2024	Pavi Caretaker	Malayalam	Yes	Yes	
2024	Roopanthara	Kannada	Yes	Yes	
2025	Bazooka	Malayalam	Yes	No	
