= The Rise of Ashoka =

2026 Indian Kannada-Language film

- Poster
- Directed by: Vinod V Dhondale
- Written by: Dayanand T. K.
- Produced by: Vardhan Hari; Jaishnavi; Sathish Ninasam
- Starring: Sathish Ninasam; Sapthami Gowda
- Cinematography: Lavith
- Edited by: Manu Shedgar
- Music by: Poornachandra Tejaswi
- Production companies: Vriddhi Creations; Sathish Picture House
- Distributed by: KVN Productions
- Release date: 27 February 2026
- Running time: 133 minutes
- Country: India
- Language: Kannada

The Rise of Ashoka is a 2026 Indian Kannada-language period action drama film directed by Vinod V Dhondale, written by Dayanand T. K and produced by Vardhan Hari and Sathish Ninasam. Featuring Sathish Ninasam, Sapthami Gowda and B. Suresha in lead roles, the film also stars Sampath Maithreya, Gopalkrishna Deshpande, Yash Shetty, P. Ravi Shankar, and Jagappa in the supporting roles.

The film, earlier titled as Ashoka Blade, took considerable time in its making since the director Vinod Dhondale passed away during the production. Editor Manu Shedgar stepped in to helm the project and completed the remaining portions. It was officially released in theatres on 23 January 2026 along with its Tamil and Telugu versions.

== Plot ==
The Rise of Ashoka (2026) is set in the village of Avarati near Mysuru, where the local barber community lives under an exploitative system controlled by a powerful middleman who monopolizes their livelihood and keeps them subjugated through fear and economic coercion. Ashoka, a young man from this community, grows up largely unaware of the depth of this oppression, as his focus is on education and his personal ambition to secure a government job, particularly as a revenue officer. His aspirations are supported by his father, who makes significant sacrifices to fund Ashoka's education, believing it to be a path out of generational hardship.

As Ashoka becomes increasingly aware of the systemic injustice and the brutal control exercised over his community, his personal goals begin to collide with a broader moral responsibility. The suffering of the barbers, enforced by violence and humiliation, triggers a transformation in him from an individual seeking professional stability to an emerging voice of resistance. Gradually, Ashoka confronts the entrenched power structures that sustain the exploitation, particularly the influential broker who benefits from the community's labor while denying them dignity and fair compensation.

== Cast ==
- Sathish Ninasam as Ashoka
- Sapthami Gowda as Ambika
- B. Suresha
- Sampath Maithreya as Kutty Babji
- Gopalkrishna Deshpande
- Yash Shetty
- P. Ravi Shankar
- Honnavalli Krishna
- Jaggappa
- Devanuru Chandru
- Dragon Manju
- Harish Parade
- Mahadev Lalipalya
- Moogu Suresh
- Prakash Urs
- Jackie Murthy

== Music ==
The soundtrack and background score is composed by Poornachandra Tejaswi, with lyrics contributed by Sathish Ninasam.

Track listing
No.	Title	Lyrics	Singer(s)	Length
1.	"Yako Yako"	Poornachandra Tejaswi	Pancham Jeeva, Prithwi Bhat	4:32
2.	"Yelo Maadeva"	Sathish Ninasam	Kailash Kher, Siddhu, Sadhvini Koppa	4:20
3.	"Siddhayya Swami"	Sathish Ninasam	Sathish Ninasam	4:40
4.	"Kalyanave Gowri"	Traditional folk	Pancham Jeeva, Shwetha Hiremath	5:41

== Reception ==
Pranati AS of Deccan Herald said that "Enter Ashoka, with dreams of becoming a revenue officer. When he learns about the plight of his community, he tears (quite literally and stylishly) those dreams and wages a war against Babji." A Sharadhaa of The New Indian Express said that "The Rise of Ashoka is an earnest, observant social drama with conviction and good performances, yet uneven in execution." Susmita Sameera of The Times of India said that "Ultimately, The Rise of Ashoka presents a conventional narrative of resistance within a caste-structured society. While its themes are socially relevant, the predictable structure and uneven character development limit its overall effectiveness."
