= Arvind Sastry =

Indian film producer & actor

- Occupation(s): Director, screenwriter, editor
- Years active: 2016–present

Arvind Sastry is an Indian film director, screenwriter and an editor in Kannada cinema. He is best known for his debut film, Kahi, an independent movie which was released in late 2016.

== Early life ==
Arvind was born in Bengaluru district in Karnataka in 1990. He is an alumnus of Manipal Institute of Technology (I&P Engineering). Then, he pursued his post-graduate studies in screenplay writing and film direction at Ramoji Academy of Film and Television, Hyderabad before making Kahi.

== Career ==
In 2016, Arvind stepped into Kannada film industry with the independent film, Kahi. The film garnered rave reviews and went on to win the Karnataka State Film Award for Best Original Screenplay making Arvind the youngest ever recipient of the award. Kahi was one of the Kannada films to be streamed on Netflix.

In 2017, Arvind started work on his second directorial venture, a film named Alidu Ulidavaru. The film's story was written by Sudheer Shanbogue while Arvind wrote the screenplay. The film had its theatrical release in late 2019. The film generated largely positive reviews and went on to complete 100 days of theatrical run. In November 2019, Arvind began work on a movie titled Vaitarani starring Sathish Ninasam and Sharmiela Mandre in lead roles. The shooting for the film's first schedule took place in London. The rest of the film was shot in Karnataka. In June 2020, the film was renamed as Dasara. The film was shot in between COVID-19 lockdowns and its production was completed in September 2021. It has been in post-production since then.

In late 2021, Arvind started writing Bisi-Bisi Ice-Cream, which would go on to become his third feature film venture. He served as the movie's writer, director and editor. The movie had its theatrical release in mid-2024 and has garnered positive reviews.

In late 2022, Arvind directed a web-series produced by MTV named Primetime with The Murthys. The English language web-series was dubbed into Hindi and Tamil. It started streaming on Jio Cinema from mid-2024.

== Filmography ==
=== As film director, screenwriter and editor ===
Year	Film	Notes
2016	Kahi	
2019	Alidu Ulidavaru	
2024	Bisi-Bisi Ice-Cream	

=== Television ===
Year	Title	Channel	Language	Notes
2022	Primetime with The Murthys	MTV	English	

== Awards ==
Arvind Sastry won the award for the Best Original Screenplay at the Karnataka State Film Award for Best Screenplay for Kahi.
