= Poovan =

- Release poster
- Directed by: Vineeth Vasudevan
- Written by: Varun Dhara
- Produced by: Shebin Backer; Girish A. D.
- Starring: Antony Varghese; Sajin Cherukayil; Vineeth Vishwam; Vineeth Vasudevan
- Cinematography: Sajith Purushan
- Edited by: Akash Joseph Varghese
- Music by: Midhun Mukundan
- Production companies: Shebin Backer Productions; Stuck Cows
- Distributed by: Central Pictures (Theatrical); Zee5 (World-wide)
- Release date: 20 January 2023
- Running time: 131 minutes
- Country: India
- Language: Malayalam

Poovan (transl. Rooster) is a 2023 Indian Malayalam-language film directed by Vineeth Vasudevan. The film stars Antony Varghese, Sajin Cherukayil, Vineeth Vishwam and Vineeth Vasudevan. It is produced by Shebin Backer and Girish A.D. and the music is composed by Midhun Mukundan. It was theatrically released on 20 January 2023.

== Synopsis ==
The daily routine of a young man with sleep disorder gets disturbed with the arrival of a white coloured rooster in his neighbourhood.

== Cast ==
- Antony Varghese as Hari
- Sajin Cherukayil as Benny
- Vineeth Vishwam as Manu
- Vineeth Vasudevan as Kannan
- Akhila Bhargavan as Veena
- Anishma Anilkumar as Sini
- Bindu Satishkumar as Mariyamma
- Maniyanpilla Raju
- Rinku Ramdeer as Diju Paul
- Naslen as Himself (cameo)

== Production ==
On 2 May 2022, Antony Varghese officially announced the film by sharing the title "Poovan" through social media. This is a collaboration between Antony Varghese and makers of Super Sharanya.

On 18 May 2022, principal photography took place in Taliparamba Village, Near Kannur, Kerala. Filming was wrapped up on 19 June 2022.

== Soundtrack ==
Poovan

Soundtrack album by Midhun Mukundan and Titus Mathew
- Released: 2022
- Recorded: 2022
- Genre: Feature film soundtrack
- Length: 16:06
- Language: Malayalam

Official audio
- Poovan – Full Album on YouTube

The songs are composed by Midhun Mukundan and the lyrics are penned by Titus Mathew. The first single titled "Chanthakkaari" was released on 9 December 2022 and Second song titled "Palli Medayil" was released on 20 December 2022.

Track listing
No.	Title	Singer(s)	Length
1.	"Chanthakkaari"	Midhun Mukundan, Vineeth Sreenivasan	3:49
2.	"Palli Medayil (Carol Song)"	Titus Mathew, Midhun Mukundan	4:04
3.	"Shleehaye"	Midhun Mukundan	3:43
4.	"Kadalu Theendum"	Midhun Mukundan	2:55
5.	"Dey Malamuky"	Midhun Mukundan	1:34
6.	"Poovan Theme"	Midhun Mukundan	1:21
Total length:			16:06

== Reception ==
S. R. Praveen of The Hindu Wrote "Even if you take away the rooster and his insomnia from the script, there will remain elements of the average, light-hearted family drama. That would have still made for a better watch than these unimaginative, snooze-worthy add-ons for the sake of novelty". Cris of The News Minute Wrote "It is not a bad debut, there is promise in Vineeth Vasudevan's storytelling; it just needs some shaping up that, no doubt, experience will bring". Vignesh Madhu of Cinema Express says: "Poovan, like the rooster in the film, tries a lot but is eventually caged in mediocrity". Aparna Prasanthi of The Indian Express Wrote "'Poovan' is a film that goes through some of the usual constructions. It can also be said that the film tried to be a light hearted entertainment and failed". Sanjith Sidhardhan of Ott Play Says "Poovan has a few sparks of humour but otherwise, it feels like another chapter from the Girish AD universe that has begun to lose its novelty".

== Home media ==
The streaming rights of the film were sold to Zee5. It released on 24 March 2023.
