= Uncle (2019 film) =

2019 film

- Directed by: Frelle Petersen
- Release date: 30 October 2019 (Tokyo)
- Running time: 106 minutes
- Country: Denmark
- Language: Danish

Uncle (Danish: Onkel) is a 2019 Danish drama film directed by Frelle Petersen. It won the Tokyo Grand Prix, the top award at the 2019 Tokyo International Film Festival.
