= Rishab Shetty =

Indian actor and filmmaker (born 1983)

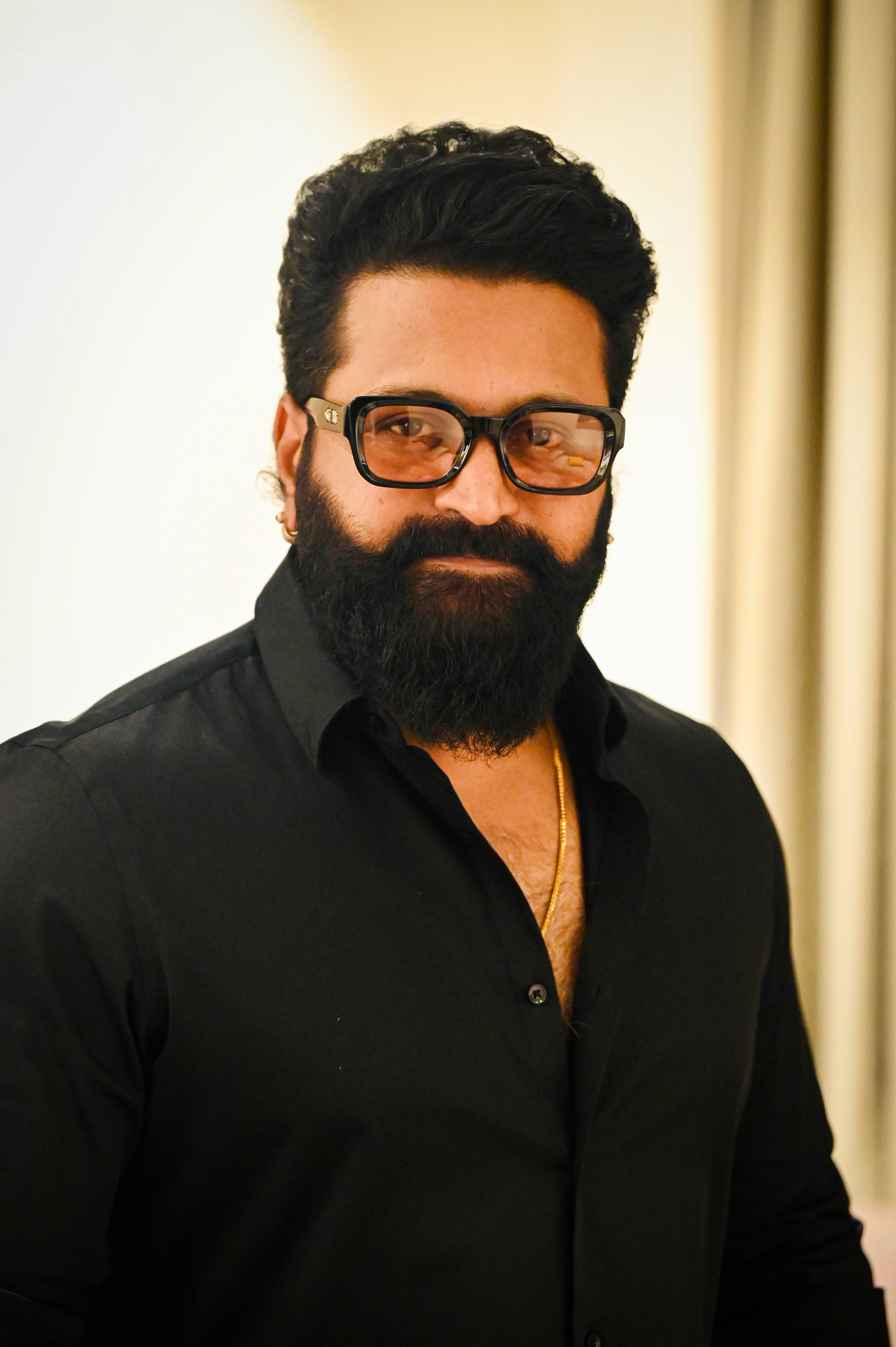
- Rishab in 2026
- Born: Prashanth Shetty; 7 July 1983 (age 43); Keradi, Karnataka, India
- Education: Vijaya College
- Occupations: Actor; Director; Producer; Screenwriter
- Years active: 2006–present
- Spouse: Pragati Shetty (m. 2017)
- Children: 2

Rishab Shetty (born 7 July 1983) is an Indian actor, film director and producer who works in Kannada cinema. He is known for his roles in Bell Bottom, Garuda Gamana Vrishabha Vahana, and Kantara franchise which was his highest-grossing directorial film, and earned him the National Film Award for Best Actor in a Leading Role.

Shetty's made his acting debut with Tuglak (2012). He next played an important role in Ulidavaru Kandante (2014) and made his directorial debut with Ricky (2016). His next directorial Kirik Party (2016) was a commercial success and fetched him Filmfare Award for Best Director, and SIIMA Award for Best Director. Later he directed Sarkari Hi. Pra. Shaale, Kasaragodu, Koduge: Ramanna Rai (2018), which got him the National Film Award for Best Children's Film and Karnataka State Film Award for Best Family Entertainer.

== Early life ==
Prashanth Shetty was born on 7 July 1983 in Keradi village in Kundapura Taluk of Udupi District, Karnataka to a Bunt family. He did his schooling in Kundapura and later joined Vijaya College, Bengaluru to pursue B.Com. He started his theatre journey by doing yakshagana plays in his hometown actively while studying in Bengaluru. He was appreciated for his work and success in these plays encouraged him to pursue acting as a profession.

== Career ==
After his graduation, Shetty worked several odd jobs like selling water cans, real estate and did hotel work while also trying for roles in movies. While working odd jobs, he also acquired a diploma in film direction from the Government Film and TV Institute in Bangalore. He started working in the film industry as a clap boy, then as a spot boy, and then was an assistant director. He met Rakshit Shetty while working in the industry, they became friends later on.

His first major acting role was in Tuglak (2012). He played a small but impactful role of a police officer in Pawan Kumar's Lucia and then played an important role in Ulidavaru Kandante, which was directed by Rakshit Shetty. In 2016, his directorial debut Ricky starring Rakshit Shetty received an average response at the box office. In the same year, he directed Kirik Party, which was an industry hit at the box office. After this, In 2018 Shetty directed and produced Sarkari Hi. Pra. Shaale, Kasaragodu, Koduge: Ramanna Rai, which received critical acclaim and won the National Film Award for Best Children's Film as well as Karnataka State Film Award.

He debuted as a lead actor in Bell Bottom (2019) which was well received. His major role after this was that of Mangaluru-based gangster Hari in the film Garuda Gamana Vrishabha Vahana (2021). The film was a commercial and critical success in which the performance of Rishab Shetty and its director Raj B. Shetty was widely appreciated by critics.

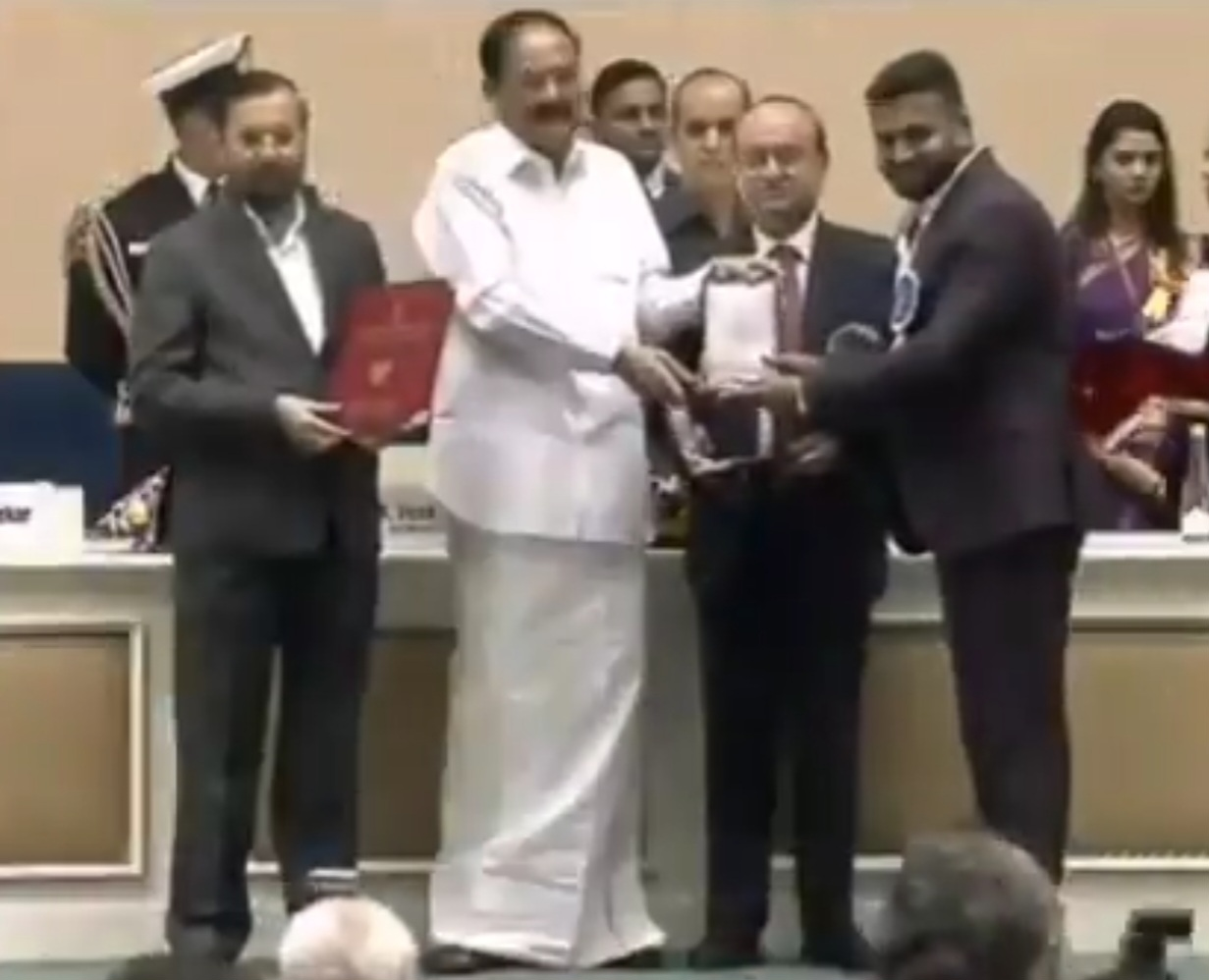
The Vice President M. Venkaiah Naidu conferring the National Film Award for Best Children's Film in December 2019

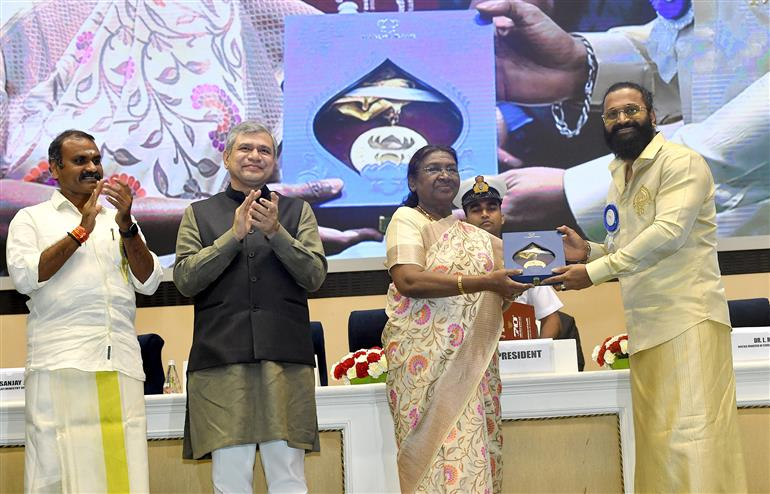
The President Droupadi Murmu conferring the National Film Award for Best Actor in a Leading Role in October 2024

He then appeared briefly in two films, Mishan Impossible and Harikathe Alla Girikathe (both in 2022), the former being his Telugu film debut. Shetty collaborated with Hombale Films for his next directorial Kantara in which he was also the lead actor. It was initially released only in Kannada and was later dubbed into other languages, after receiving critical success. Kantara is the second highest-grossing Kannada film of all-time worldwide and also received Swarna Kamal for Best Popular Film Providing Wholesome Entertainment and Rishab won Rajat Kamal for Best Actor in a Leading Role for his performance and At the 54th IFFI 2023 he won IFFI Special Jury Award.

In 2025, he acted and directed Kantara: Chapter 1, A prequel to the 2022 film Kantara. The film became a commercial success at the box office and is currently the second highest-grossing Kannada film of all-time, second highest grossing Indian film of 2025 and also ranks among highest-grossing Indian films of all time.

== Filmography ==
Key
†	Denotes films that have not yet been released

=== As actor ===
- All films are in Kannada language, unless otherwise mentioned

Year	Title	Role	Notes	Ref
2012	Tuglak	Villain		
2013	Attahasa	Undercover Cop		
2013	Lucia	Police Inspector		
2014	Ulidavaru Kandanthe	Raghu		
2014	Gargar Mandala	—N/a	Dubbing artist for Adarsh	
2016	Ricky	Radhakrishna's friend		
2018	Sarkari Hi. Pra. Shaale	Inspector Kempraju		
2018	Ambi Ning Vayassaytho	Director of the movie	Cameo appearance	
2019	Bell Bottom	Detective Divakara		
2019	Katha Sangama	Mentally Disturbed Person		
2019	Avane Srimannarayana	Cowboy Krishna	Cameo appearance	
2021	Hero	Hero		
2021	SriKrishna@gmail.com	Police Inspector	Cameo appearance	
2021	Garuda Gamana Vrishabha Vahana	Hari		
2022	Mishan Impossible	Khaleel	Telugu film; Cameo appearance	
2022	Harikathe Alla Girikathe	Giri and Himself	Dual roles	
2022	Kantara	Kaadubettu Shiva and Annappa	Dual roles	
2023	Hostel Hudugaru Bekagiddare	Senior	Cameo appearance	
2025	Kantara: Chapter 1	Berme, Mayakara, Annappa and Kaadubettu Shiva	Four roles	

=== As director ===
Year	Title	Notes
2016	Ricky	Debut as director
2016	Kirik Party	
2018	Sa.Hi.Pra.Shaale Kasaragodu, Koduge: Ramanna Rai	
2022	Kantara	
2025	Kantara: Chapter 1	

=== As producer ===
Year	Title	Notes
2018	Sa.Hi.Pra.Shaale Kasaragodu, Koduge: Ramanna Rai	
2019	Katha Sangama	
2021	Hero	Also co-writer
2021	Pedro	
2022	Shivamma Yarehanchinala	
2024	Colors	As presenter; TV mini series
2024	Laughing Buddha	

== Philanthropy ==
On 7 July 2023, He founded the Rishab Shetty Foundation, through which he adopted a Kannada government school in Keradi and supports educational initiatives. In 2026, he participated in the launch of the International Volunteer Year (IVY) 2026 initiative.

== Awards and nominations ==
Film	Award	Category	Result	Ref
Kirik Party	2016 Karnataka State Film Awards	Best Family Entertainer	Won	
Kirik Party	64th Filmfare Awards South	Best Director – Kannada	Won	
Kirik Party	2nd IIFA Utsavam	Best Director	Nominated	
Kirik Party	6th SIIMA Awards	Best Director – Kannada	Won	
Sarkari Hi. Pra. Shaale, Kasaragodu, Koduge: Ramanna Rai	66th National Film Awards	Best Children's Film	Won	
Sarkari Hi. Pra. Shaale, Kasaragodu, Koduge: Ramanna Rai	2018 Karnataka State Film Awards	Best Family Entertainer	Won	
Sarkari Hi. Pra. Shaale, Kasaragodu, Koduge: Ramanna Rai	66th Filmfare Awards South	Best Film – Kannada	Nominated	
Sarkari Hi. Pra. Shaale, Kasaragodu, Koduge: Ramanna Rai	66th Filmfare Awards South	Best Director – Kannada	Nominated	
Sarkari Hi. Pra. Shaale, Kasaragodu, Koduge: Ramanna Rai	8th SIIMA Awards	Best Director – Kannada	Nominated	
Sarkari Hi. Pra. Shaale, Kasaragodu, Koduge: Ramanna Rai	8th SIIMA Awards	Best Film – Kannada	Nominated	
Garuda Gamana Vrishabha Vahana	10th SIIMA Awards	Best Actor – Kannada	Nominated	
Garuda Gamana Vrishabha Vahana	67th Filmfare Awards South	Best Actor – Kannada	Nominated	
Shivamma Yarehanchinala	Three Continents Festival	Young Jury Award	Won	
Kantara: A Legend	54th International Film Festival of India	IFFI Special Jury Award	Won	
Kantara: A Legend	11th SIIMA Awards	Best Director – Kannada	Won	
Kantara: A Legend	11th SIIMA Awards	Best Actor (Critics)	Won	
Kantara: A Legend	68th Filmfare Awards South	Best Director – Kannada	Nominated	
Kantara: A Legend	68th Filmfare Awards South	Best Actor – Kannada	Won	
Kantara: A Legend	70th National Film Awards	Best Actor in a Leading Role	Won	
Kantara: A Legend	70th National Film Awards	Best Popular Film Providing Wholesome Entertainment	Won	
Kantara: A Legend	Critics' Choice Film Awards	Best Actor	Won	
Kantara: A Legend	Chandanavana Film Critics Academy Awards	Best Actor	Won	
Kantara: A Legend	Chittara Star Awards	Best Actor Male	Won	
Kantara: A Legend	Chittara Star Awards	Best Director	Won	
Kantara: A Legend	TV9 Nava Nakshtra Awards	Divine Star Award	Won	
Kantara: A Legend – Chapter 1	India Business Leader Award	Entertainment Leader of the Year	Won	
Kantara: A Legend – Chapter 1	Chittara Star Awards	Best Actor	Won	
Kantara: A Legend – Chapter 1	Indian National Cine Academy Awards	Best Actor (Kannada)	Won	
Kantara: A Legend – Chapter 1	Indian National Cine Academy Awards	Best Director (Kannada)	Won	
Kantara: A Legend – Chapter 1	Prajavani Kannada Cini Sammana	Acting Excellence	Won	
Kantara: A Legend – Chapter 1	Prajavani Kannada Cini Sammana	Excellence in Film Direction	Won	
Kantara: A Legend – Chapter 1	TV9 Nava Nakshtra Awards	Best Director & Best Actor	Won	

== Other recognitions ==
- 2022: OTT Play honoured Rishab Shetty with "Pioneering Contributions to New Wave Cinema" Award and In 2023, it honoured him "Gamechanger of the Year" Award.
- 2025: GQ Men of the Year honoured him with "Cinematic Powerhouse" Award.
