= SIIMA Award for Best Director – Kannada =

Film award

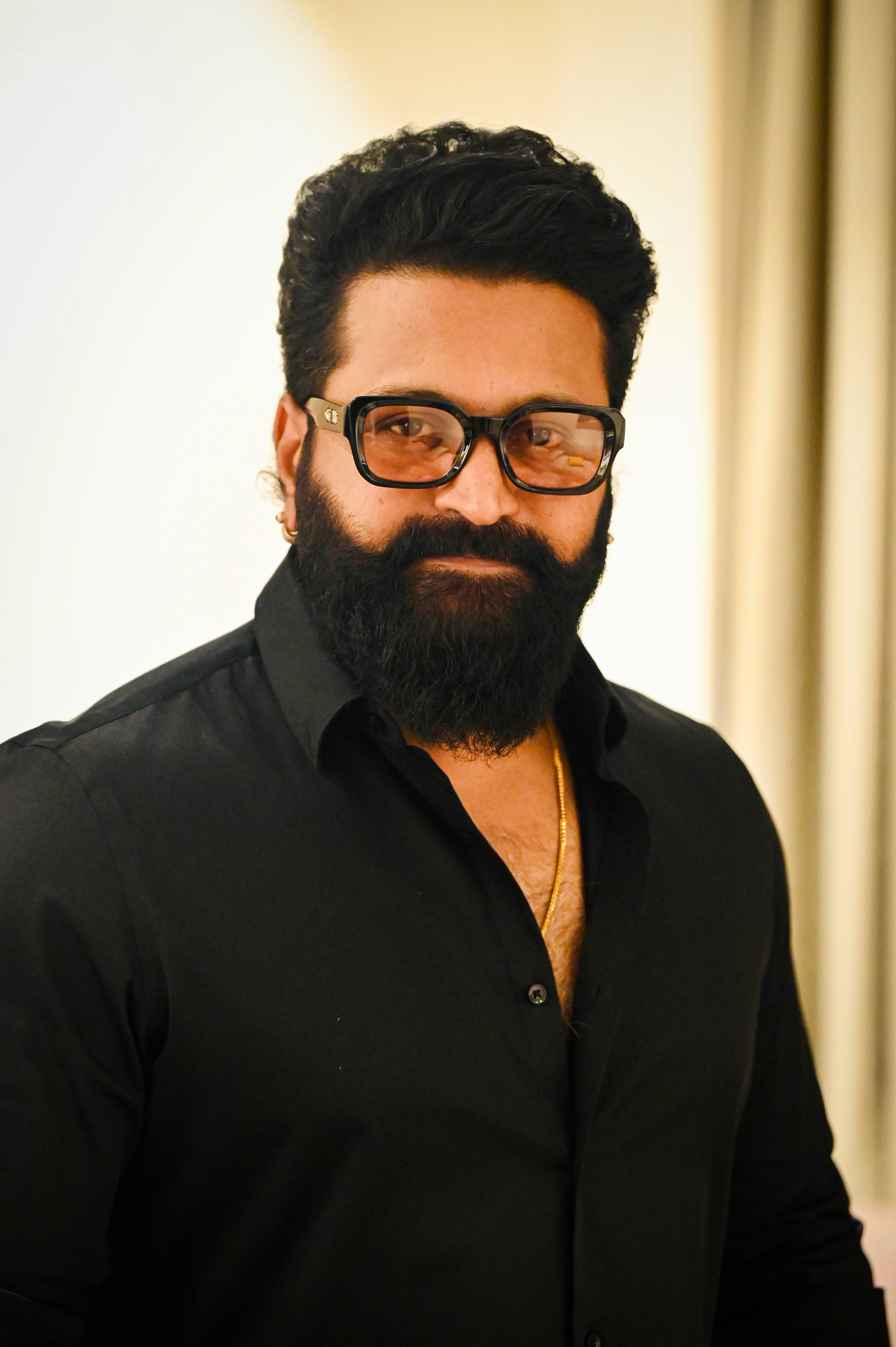
- The 2026 recipient: Rishab Shetty
- Awarded for: Best Direction Achievement in Kannada cinema
- Country: India
- Presented by: Vibri Media Group
- First award: 21 June 2012 (for films released in 2011)
- Most recent winner: Rishab Shetty, Kantara: Chapter 1 (2025)

Highlights
- Most wins: Rishab Shetty (3)

SIIMA Award for Best Director – Kannada is presented by the Vibri Media Group as part of the annual South Indian International Movie Awards, for best film direction done by a director in Kannada films. The award was first presented in 2012 for films released in 2011.

== Winners ==
Year	Director	Film	Ref.
2011	Nagashekar	Sanju Weds Geetha	
2012	A. P. Arjun	Addhuri	
2013	Pavan Wadeyar	Googly	
2014	Santhosh Ananddram	Mr. and Mrs. Ramachari	
2015	Upendra	Uppi 2	
2016	Rishab Shetty	Kirik Party	
2017	Santhosh Ananddram	Raajakumara	
2018	Prashanth Neel	KGF: Chapter 1	
2019	V. Harikrishna	Yajamana	
2019	Pon Kumaran	Yajamana	
2020	Pannaga Bharana	French Biriyani	
2021	Tharun Sudhir	Roberrt	
2022	Rishab Shetty	Kantara	
2023	Hemanth M. Rao	Sapta Saagaradaache Ello: Side A	
2024	Upendra	UI	
2025	Rishab Shetty	Kantara: Chapter 1	
