= SIIMA Award for Best Film – Kannada =

South Indian film award

- Awarded for: Best Kannada-language film of the year
- Country: India
- Presented by: Vibri Media Group
- First award: 21 June 2012 (for films released in 2011)
- Most recent winner: Kantara: Chapter 1 (2025)

The SIIMA Award for Best Film – Kannada is presented by Vibri media group as part of its annual South Indian International Movie Awards for Kannada films. The award was first given in 2012 for films released in 2011.

== Winners ==
Year	Film	Studio	Ref
2011	Saarathi	K. V. Satya Prakash	
2012	Katari Veera Surasundarangi	Munirathna	
2013	Myna	Omkar Movies	
2014	Mr. and Mrs. Ramachari	Jayanna Combines	
2015	Mythri	Omkar Movies	
2016	Kirik Party	Paramvah Studios and Pushkar Films	
2017	Raajakumara	Hombale Films	
2018	K.G.F: Chapter 1	Hombale Films	
2019	Yajamana	Media House Studio	
2020	Love Mocktail	Krishna Talkies	
2021	Garuda Gamana Vrishabha Vahana	Lighter Buddha Productions	
2022	777 Charlie	Paramvah Studios	
2023	Kaatera	Rockline Entertainments	
2024	Krishnam Pranaya Sakhi	Trishul Entertainments	
2025	Kantara: Chapter 1	Hombale Films	
