= Shivamma Yarehanchinala =

- Promotional poster
- Directed by: Jaishankar Aryar
- Written by: Jaishankar Aryar
- Produced by: Rishab Shetty
- Starring: Sharanamma Chetti; Chennamma Abbegere; Shivu Abbegere; Shruthi Kondenahalli; Chennappa Hansi; Shivanand Sadar
- Cinematography: Vikas Urs; Saumyananda Sahi
- Edited by: Jaishankar Aryar; Chandan CM
- Production company: Rishab Shetty Films
- Distributed by: KRG Studios
- Release dates: 2022 (27th Busan International Film Festival); 14 June 2024
- Running time: 107 Minutes
- Country: India
- Language: Kannada

Shivamma Yarehanchinala (or Shivamma) is a 2022 Indian Kannada-language comedy drama film written and directed by Jaishankar Aryar, starring Sharanamma Chetti in the titular role. The film is backed by Rishab Shetty under his Rishab Shetty Films banner. Shivamma chronicles the story of a poor, middle-aged woman sales representative for an energy drink company. The entire cast of the film consists of non actors.

The film was initially screened at the 27th Busan International Film Festival where it won the New Currents Award. The film was later screened in various film festivals across the world and won many awards including the Fajr International Film Festival and Three Continents Festival. It was theatrically released in Karnataka on 14 June 2024 to positive reviews.

== Plot ==
Shivamma, a 46-year-old poverty-stricken woman, invests her hard-earned money in a network marketing business to make some quick money, which puts her daughter's imminent marriage at stake.

== Cast ==
- Sharanamma Chetti as Shivamma
- Shivu Abbegere as Shivu
- Shruthi Kondenahalli as Jyothi
- Chennappa Hansi as Rudrappa
- Shivanand Sadar as Mallappa

== Reception ==
A critic from The Times of India wrote that "Shivamma comes with the ‘festival film tag’, and may not be everyone's cup of tea, especially the commercial cinema-goers. Sure there are no action sequences between 2 actors, but there is a fight of a gritty woman, who does it all with no help or support from anyone whatsoever, and that itself is worth watching and supporting". A critic from Deccan Herald wrote that "With sharp dialogues, evocative cinematography and remarkable sound design, the film poignantly captures the aesthetics of rural landscape".
