= List of highest-grossing Kannada films =

Kannada cinema is a part of Indian cinema based in Bengaluru, Karnataka. The films are made primarily in Kannada-language. The 2006 film Mungaru Male is the first Kannada movie to gross ₹50 crores. The 2017 film Raajakumara is the first Kannada movie to gross ₹75 crore mark.

KGF: Chapter 1 (2018) is the first Kannada film to achieve ₹100, ₹150, ₹200 and ₹250 crore gross milestone. Its sequel KGF: Chapter 2 (2022) is the first Kannada film to achieve ₹500, ₹750, ₹1,000 and ₹1,250 crore gross milestones. Kantara: Chapter 1 (2025) was reported to be the first film to gross over ₹200 crore as well as ₹250 crore within Karnataka. This ranking lists the highest-grossing Kannada films which are filmed in Kannada language, based on conservative global box office estimates as reported by organisations classified as green by Wikipedia. (Note: See WP:RSP, WP:ICTFSOURCES) However, there is no official tracking of figures.

== Highest-grossing films ==
Background shading indicates that a film is currently showing in theatres worldwide.

Rank	Title	Worldwide gross	Year	Ref.
1	KGF: Chapter 2	₹1,200–1,250 crore	2022	(Note: The New Indian Express and DNA India reported the worldwide collection to be around ₹1,200 crore to ₹1,216 crore, and The Hindustan Times mentioned the collection as ₹1,207 crore. News 18 and India Today mentioned that the collection was ₹1,240 crore. The Times Of India, Vijaya Karnataka, TV9 Kannada and Asianet News reported that the movie grossed ₹1250 crores. News 18 reported a gross of ₹1500 crores.)
2	Kantara: Chapter 1	₹850–852 crore	2025	(Note: Kantara: Chapter 1's reported worldwide grosses vary between ₹850 crore (Deccan Chronicle, Cinema Express, The New Indian Express, and DNA India) – ₹852 crore (Deccan Herald and News18))
3	Kantara	₹400–450 crore	2022	(Note: Kantara's reported worldwide grosses vary between ₹400 crore (Deccan Herald India Today, Firstpost, DNA, News 18, The Economic Times, The Indian Express) – ₹450 crore (Hindustan Times, Outlook, The New Indian Express))
4	Toxic: A Fairy Tale for Grown-Ups	₹342.07 crore	2026	
5	KGF: Chapter 1	₹250 crore	2018	
6	Vikrant Rona	₹159−210 crore	2022	(Note: Vikrant Rona's reported worldwide grosses vary between ₹159 crore (Hindustan Times) – ₹200 crore (DNA, India Today) – ₹210 crore Telegraph))
7	Premada Oorali	₹154.32 crore	2026	
8	James	₹151 crore	2022	
9	Su From So	₹125 crore	2025	
10	777 Charlie	₹105–115 crore	2022	
11	Kurukshetra	₹81–90 crore	2019	
12	Raajakumara	₹75 crore	2017	
13	Mungaru Male	₹70–75 crore	2006	
14	Kaatera	₹67–200 crore	2023	(Note: Bollywood Hungama gave a domestic gross figure of ₹67 crores. News18 India estimated the figures to be ₹80 crores. Deccan Herald reported its collections to be less than ₹90 crores. The Hindu and Zee Media Corporation reported the collections to be over ₹100 crores while other websites reported the collections to be ₹200 crores amidst speculation of tampering box office reports by HT Media.)
15	Max	₹60–62 crore	2024	
16	Avane Srimannarayana	₹56 crore	2019	
17	Roberrt	₹55–78 crore	2021	(Note: Three years after its theatrical run, the producer admitted to have fabricated its collections and had inflated the figures earlier; revealing the actual collection to be only ₹55 crores as against the trade estimate of 78 crores at the time of its release. The trade re-estimated the figures to be ₹55 crore in 2026.)
18	The Villain	₹54–57 crore	2018	
19	Pailwaan	₹52.7 crore	2019	
20	Mark	₹51.30 crore	2025	
21	Yajamana	₹50–52 crore	2019	
22	Kirik Party	₹50 crore	2016	
22	Mr & Mrs Ramachari	₹50 crore	2014	
24	UI	₹47 crore	2024	
25	Pogaru	₹45 crore	2021	

== Highest-grossing films by opening week ==
Rank	Title	Worldwide gross	Year	Ref.
1	KGF: Chapter 2	₹719 crore	2022	
2	Kantara: Chapter 1	₹509 crore	2025	
3	Toxic: A Fairy Tale for Grown-Ups	₹328.45 crore	2026	
4	Vikrant Rona	₹150 crore	2022	
5	James	₹127 crore	2022	
6	KGF: Chapter 1	₹113 crore	2018	
7	Avane Srimannarayana	₹50 crore	2019	
8	Kantara	₹50 crore	2022	
9	777 Charlie	₹47.25 crore	2022	

- The Villain (2018), Pogaru (2021), Roberrt (2021) and Kaatera (2023) are excluded from the list on account of ambiguity and mismatch in weekly and final collections. (Note: In case of The Villain, the makers claimed the movie collected ₹60 crores in first weekend, whereas the trade reported it to be only ₹29 crores. In case of Pogaru, the six-day collection was reported to be ₹45 crores at the time of release, whereas at the year end, it was reported that ₹45 crores was the total collections of the movie. Hence, not included in the list due to ambiguity. Roberrt is excluded from the list because three years after its theatrical run, the producer admitted to have fabricated its collections and had inflated the figures earlier; revealing the actual total collection to be only ₹55 crores as against the trade estimate of first week collection of ₹78 crores at the time of its release. In case of Kaatera, the box-office collection range is considered from ₹67 crores to ₹200 crores due to wide variation in the box-office figures reported by various sources. Bollywood Hungama gave a domestic gross figure of ₹67 crores. Deccan Herald reported its collections to be less than ₹90 crores. The Hindu and Zee Media Corporation reported the collections to be over ₹100 crores while other websites reported the collections to be ₹200 crores amidst speculation of tampering box office reports by HT Media.)

== Highest-grossing films by month ==
Month	Title	Worldwide gross	Year	Ref.
January	Kranti	₹41 crore	2023	
February	Pogaru	₹45 crore	2021	
March	James	₹151 crore	2022	
April	KGF: Chapter 2	₹1,200–1,250 crore	2022	(Note: KGF: Chapter 2's reported worldwide grosses vary between ₹1,187 crore (Pinkvilla) – ₹1,200 crore (Indulge Express) – ₹1,240 crore (News18 India) - ₹1250 crores (Asianet News) – ₹1,300 crore (India Today) - ₹1500 crores(News 18))
May	Maanikya	₹40 crore	2014	
June	777 Charlie	₹105–115 crore	2022	
July	Vikrant Rona	₹159–210 crore	2022	
August	Toxic: A Fairy Tale for Grown-Ups	₹341.39 crore	2026	
September	Kantara	₹400–450 crore	2022	
October	Kantara: Chapter 1	₹850–852 crore	2025	
November	Bhairathi Ranagal	₹30 crore	2024	
November	Krantiveera Sangolli Rayanna	₹30 crore	2012	
December	KGF: Chapter 1	₹250 crore	2018	

== Films with highest footfalls ==
Rank	Title	Footfalls	Year	Ref.
1	KGF: Chapter 2	5.05 crore	2022	
2	Kantara: Chapter 1	3.20 crore	2025	
3	Kantara	1 crore	2022	
4	KGF: Chapter 1	75 lakh	2018	
5	Raajakumara	65 lakh	2017	
6	Su From So	40 lakh	2025	

== Highest-grossing milestone films ==
The films with a minimum worldwide gross of ₹20 crore are considered.

Title	Year	Worldwide gross	Ref.
Apthamitra	2004	₹20 crore	
Jogi	2005	₹30 crore	
Mungaru Male	2006	₹70 crore	
Raajakumara	2017	₹75 crore	
KGF: Chapter 1	2018	₹250 crore	
KGF: Chapter 2	2022	₹1,200–1,250 crore	

== Highest-grossing films by year ==
- There are no official box office tracking figures for Kannada movies. However, movies which are prominently popular in most of the sources have been considered in the table

Year	Title	Ref.
1934	Sati Sulochana	
1935	Sadaarame	
1936	Samsara Nauka	
1937	Purandaradasa	
1941	Vasantasena	
1942	Bhakta Prahalada	
1943	Satya Harishchandra	
1944	Radha Ramana	
1946	Hemareddy Mallamma	
1947	Mahatma Kabir	
1948	Bharathi	
1949	Nagakannika	
1950	Shaneeshwara Mahatme	
1951	Jaganmohini	
1952	Sri Srinivasa Kalyana	
1953	Gunasagari	
1954	Bedara Kannappa	
1955	Mahakavi Kalidasa	
1956	Bhakta Vijaya	
1957	Rathnagiri Rahasya	
1958	Bhookailasa	
1959	Mahishasura Mardini	
1960	Ranadheera Kanteerava	
1961	Kittur Chennamma	
1962	Rathna Manjari	
1963	Veera Kesari	
1964	Chandavalliya Thota	
1965	Satya Harishchandra	
1966	Mantralaya Mahatme	
1967	Belli Moda	
1968	Jedara Bale	
1969	Mayor Muthanna	
1970	Sri Krishnadevaraya	
1971	Kasturi Nivasa	
1972	Bangaarada Manushya	
1973	Gandhada Gudi	
1974	Sampathige Savaal	
1975	Mayura	
1976	Naa Ninna Mareyalare	
1977	Sanaadi Appanna	
1978	Shankar Guru	
1979	Huliya Haalina Mevu	
1980	Auto Raja	
1981	Antha	
1982	Chalisuva Modagalu	
1983	Kaviratna Kalidasa	
1984	Bandhana	
1985	Nee Bareda Kadambari	
1986	Anuraga Aralithu	
1987	Premaloka	
1988	Ranadheera	
1989	Nanjundi Kalyana	
1990	Rani Maharani	
1991	Ramachaari	
1992	Jeevana Chaitra	
1993	Aakasmika	
1994	Odahuttidavaru	
1995	Om	
1996	Janumada Jodi	
1997	Amruthavarshini	
1998	A	
1999	Suryavamsha	
2000	Yajamana	
2001	Nanna Preethiya Hudugi	
2002	Thavarige Baa Thangi	
2003	Raktha Kanneeru	
2004	Apthamitra	
2005	Jogi	
2006	Mungaru Male	
2007	Cheluvina Chittara	
2008	Buddhivantha	
2009	Raaj – The Showman	
2010	Jackie	
2011	Saarathi	
2012	Sangolli Rayanna	
2013	Bulbul	
2014	Mr. and Mrs. Ramachari	
2015	RangiTaranga	
2016	Kirik Party	
2017	Raajakumara	
2018	KGF: Chapter 1	
2019	Kurukshetra	
2020	Popcorn Monkey Tiger	
2021	Roberrt	
2022	KGF: Chapter 2	
2023	Kaatera	
2024	Max	
2025	Kantara: Chapter 1	
2026	Toxic: A Fairy Tale for Grown-Ups	

== Highest-grossing franchises ==
Highest-grossing franchises

Rank	Franchise	Worldwide gross (crore) (Note: The franchise gross is calculated using the lowest reported gross for each film in the franchise.)	No. of films	Average gross (crore)	Highest grosser

1	KGF	₹1,450	2	₹725	KGF: Chapter 2 (₹1,200–1,250 crore)
1	KGF: Chapter 2 (2022)	₹1,200			
2	KGF: Chapter 1 (2018)	₹250			

2	Kantara	₹1,250	2	₹625	Kantara: Chapter 1 (₹850–852 crore)
1	Kantara: Chapter 1 (2025)	₹850			
2	Kantara (2022)	₹400			

3	Kotigobba	₹80.72	2	₹40	Kotigobba 3 (₹45.32 crore)
1	Kotigobba 3 (2021)	₹45.32			
2	Kotigobba 2 (2016)	₹35.40			

4	Upendra	₹50	2	₹25	Uppi 2 (₹40 crore)
1	Uppi 2 (2015)	₹40			
2	Upendra (1999)	₹10			

5	Gaalipata	₹47	2	₹24	Gaalipata 2 (₹35 crore)
1	Gaalipata 2 (2022)	₹35			
2	Gaalipata (2008)	₹12			

6	Mufti	₹45	2	₹23	Bhairathi Ranagal (₹30 crore)
1	Bhairathi Ranagal (2024)	₹30			
2	Mufti (2017)	₹15			

7	Jogi	₹38	2	₹19	Jogi (₹30 crore)
1	Jogi (2005)	₹30			
2	Jogayya (2011)	₹8			

== See also ==
- List of highest-grossing Indian films
- List of highest-grossing Hindi films
- List of highest-grossing Indian Bengali films
- List of highest-grossing Marathi films
- List of highest-grossing Punjabi-language films
- List of highest-grossing South Indian films
- List of highest-grossing Malayalam films
- List of highest-grossing Tamil films
- List of highest-grossing Telugu films
- List of highest-grossing films in India
