= Arvind S Kashyap =

Indian cinematographer

Arvind S. Kashyap
- Occupation: Cinematographer
- Years active: 2017–present
- Notable work: 777 Charlie (2022); Kantara, Chapter 1 (2022–2025); Hostel Hudugaru Bekagiddare (2023)

Arvind S. Kashyap is an Indian cinematographer who works primarily in Kannada cinema. Works include 777 Charlie (2022), Kantara (2022), Hostel Hudugaru Bekagiddare (2023), and Kantara: Chapter 1 (2025).

== Filmography ==
Year	Title	Language	Notes
2017	Dayavittu Gamanisi	Kannada	
2019	Lambodara	Kannada	
2019	Bell Bottom	Kannada	
2019	Alidu Ulidavaru	Kannada	
2019	Katha Sangama	Kannada	"Ranibowland" Segment
2019	Avane Srimannarayana	Kannada	Additional Cinematography
2021	Hero	Kannada	
2021	Chaavu Kaburu Challaga	Telugu	Additional Cinematography
2022	777 Charlie	Kannada	
2022	Kantara	Kannada	
2023	Hostel Hudugaru Bekagiddare	Kannada	Also Co-Producer
2023	King of Kotha	Malayalam	Additional Cinematography
2024	Bachelor Party	Kannada	
2025	Kantara: Chapter 1	Kannada	
2025	Vilayath Buddha	Malayalam	Co-cinematography by Renadive
