= Colors (TV series) =

2024 Indian Kannada language TV series

- Directed by: Shreekara Bhat
- Presented by: Rishab Shetty Films
- Starring: Chetan Kumar Dharmappa; Ashwitha R Hegde; Shreyas Jayasheela
- Country of origin: India
- Original language: Kannada

Original release
- Release: 30 May 2024

Colors in a 2024 Indian Kannada language mini-series directed by Shreekara Bhat. The series stars Chetan Kumar Dharmappa, Ashwitha R Hegde, and Shreyas Jayasheela in the lead role.

== Cast ==
- Chetan Kumar Dharmappa
- Ashwitha R Hegde
- Shreyas Jayasheela

== Reception ==
Pranati A S of the Deccan Herald said that "While the film takes time to find its rhythm, its earnest performances and vibrant portrayal of Bengaluru carry it through. It stands as a refreshing romance that offers a pleasant viewing experience." Sridevi S of The Times of India said that "If you have an hour to spare, give Colours a try. The mini series is now streaming on YouTube." Pratibha Joy of OTTPlay said that "Colors is a delightful mini-series that captures middle-class romance with simplicity and charm. It makes for a pleasant, heartwarming watch that is well worth your time."
