= Pratheek Shetty =

Indian cinematographer and film editor (born 1994)

- Born: July 12, 1994 (age 32); Puttur, Karnataka
- Occupation: Film editor
- Years active: 2018–present
- Notable work: Kantara, 777 Charlie
- Awards: Karnataka State Film Award for Best Editor

Pratheek Shetty is an Indian cinematographer and film editor who works primarily in the Kannada film industry.

== Early life and education ==
Pratheek Shetty was born in Puttur, Karnataka, India. He studied at Manipal University before pursuing Computer science at Sahyadri College of Engineering, Mangalore. He worked closely with Ricky Kej.

== Filmography ==
Year	Film	Editor	Cinematographer	Language	Notes	Ref
2018	Sarkari Hi. Pra. Shaale, Kasaragodu, Koduge: Ramanna Rai	Yes	No	Kannada	National film award for Best Children's film	
2021	Hero	Yes	No	Kannada		
2022	777 Charlie	Yes	No	Kannada		
2022	Kantara	Yes	No	Kannada	National Film Award for Best Popular Film Providing Wholesome Entertainment	
2022	Gandhada Gudi	Yes	Yes	Kannada	Debut as cinematographer	
2024	Kotee	Yes	No	Kannada		
2024	Alemari	Yes	Yes	Kannada	Music video	
2025	Baida	Yes	No	Hindi		
2025	Just Married	Yes	No	Kannada		

== Awards ==
Year	Film	Award	Category	Result	Ref
2021	777 Charlie	Karnataka State Film Awards	Best Editor	Won	
2023	Kantara	Prajavani Cine Awards	Best Editor	Won	
