= Sarkari Hi. Pra. Shaale, Kasaragodu, Koduge: Ramanna Rai =

Sarkari Hi. Pra. Shale, Kasaragodu.
- Theatrical release poster
- Directed by: Rishab Shetty
- Written by: Rishab Shetty; Raj B. Shetty; Abhijit Mahesh
- Produced by: Rishab Shetty
- Starring: Anant Nag; Ranjan; Sampath; Pramod Shetty; Saptha Pavoor; Mahendra; Sohan Shetty; Prakash Thuminad; Manish Heroor
- Cinematography: Venkatesh Anguraj
- Edited by: Pradeep Rao; Pratheek Shetty
- Music by: Songs: Vasuki Vaibhav; Score: B. Ajaneesh Loknath
- Production company: Rishab Shetty Films
- Distributed by: Rishab Shetty Films through Jayanna Films
- Release date: 24 August 2018
- Country: India
- Language: Kannada

Sarkaari Hiriya Praathamika Shaale, Kaasaragodu, Kodugé: Raamanna Rai (transl. Government Higher Primary School, Kasaragodu, Donated by: Raamanna Rai) is a 2018 Indian Kannada-language socio-political comedy film written, directed and produced by Rishab Shetty, presented by Sudeepa. The film stars Anant Nag, Pramod Shetty, Ranjan, Sampath, Saptha Pavoor, Mahendra, Sohan Shetty, Prakash Thuminad, Manish Heroor and others.

The film was released on 24 August 2018 to positive reviews and was declared a success at the box office. In 2019, it won the National Film Award for Best Children's Film, at the 66th National Film Awards.

== Plot ==
In the milieu of Kasaragod (a border district in Kerala having a large Kannada speaking population), the language supremacy becomes a hothead matter. A Kannada-medium Government-run Middle and High School, faces financial difficulties due to nonreceipt of money from the government officials. As a consequence, various expenses like books, uniforms, teachers' salaries, building repairs and extracurricular activities are virtually at a standstill.

Nambiar, the righteous Principal is being harassed by a hostile and corrupt Government official, Balakrishna Panikker, who is hell-bent upon closing the school as he wants to establish the supremacy of Malayalam. In a moment of weakness, Nambiar is forced to sign on a government order without reading it, which declares that the building is unsafe and needs to be demolished. A group of students coming from normal middle class to poor backgrounds are bound by the common thread of learning in Kannada. Their lives are thrown into turmoil when Panikker comes with a government order to physically close the school.

They then decide to get a famous person to fight their case. Accordingly, they chance upon the name of one social worker in Mysore (Mysuru), Ananthapadmanabha in a newspaper. They then journey to Mysuru to persuade Ananthapadmanabha to take up their case. In a hilarious twist, there are two Ananthapadmanabhas living next to each other and both these friends are at loggerheads over trivial issues. The boys are supposed to talk to Ananthapadmanabha.M but instead, end up talking to Ananthapadmanabha P., who agrees to take up their struggle.

With a lot of hope, they bring the "famous" Ananthapadmanabha P. to Kasargod. After initial skirmishes with Panikker, it appears that the boys are fighting a losing battle. There are many minor events that help in crystallizing a hitherto scattered struggle into a cohesive well-oiled movement. The parents of the children also get involved in the same under the leadership of Ananthapadmanabha. The culmination of this is a court scene under a sympathetic judge. Ananthapadmanabha, though not a lawyer himself, is allowed to argue on behalf of the students.

Ananthapadmanabha exposes the machinations of Panikker, arguing that the pictures of the abandoned school are photoshopped and concludes the case triumphantly. Being involved with the kids makes him realize how lonely he was. He then decides to remain in Kasargod as a part-time teacher in the school. Realising his mistakes, Ananthapadmanabha M. visits the school and gives Ananthapadmanabha P. his best wishes. The film ends with a group photo of students, parents and teachers.

== Cast ==
- Anant Nag as Ananthapadmanabha P., a teacher in criminology and a self-claimed social activist who fights for the survival of S.H.P Shaale, Kasargod. He mentions his surname as "P for peacock."
- Ranjan S as Praveena Kumar, a student who failed 7th grade thrice
- Sampath as Mammootty (named after the actor), a student in 6th grade
- Saptha Pavoor as Pallavi, daughter of Upadhyaya and a student in 7th grade, Praveena's crush
- Pramod Shetty as Shantharama Upadhyaya, a well-known Yakshagana artiste and Kannada Activist, Pallavi's father
- Supreetha Shetty as Vasantha Upadhyaya, wife of Upadhyaya, Pallavi's mother
- Mahendra Prasad as Mahendra, a student in 7th grade and best friend of Praveena
- Manish Heroor as Mute Student in 7th grade and best friend of Praveena
- Democracy Sohan Shetty as Satheesha, a student in 7th grade
- Prakash Thuminad as Bhujanga, an areca nut grower
- Ramesh Bhat as Anantha Padmanabha M., a social activist and neighbor of Anantha Padmanabha P. He mentions his surname as "M for match-fixing".
- Shanil Guru as Raghava, cook in Upadhyaya's house
- Balakrishna Adoor as Balakrishna Panikker, Assistant Education Officer of Kasargodu
- Radhakrishna as Sebastian, watcher of a mansion which is owned by a Dubai resident
- Rajeev Shetty as Raamanna Rai
- Pushparaj Bollar as Driver Govindu, Raamanna's driver
- Shine Shetty as District Collector Kasargodu
- Rishab Shetty as Inspector Kemparaju (cameo), a police inspector in Mysuru

== Production ==
=== Filming ===
The film was shot in 55 days at one stretch.

== Soundtrack ==
Sarkari Hi. Pra. Shaale, Kasaragodu, Koduge: Ramanna Rai

Soundtrack album by Vasuki Vaibhav and B. Ajaneesh Loknath
- Released: 2018
- Recorded: 2018
- Genre: Soundtrack
- Label: Rishab Audio
- Producer: C.R. Bobby

Vasuki Vaibhav chronology
Choorikatte (2018)	Sarkari Hi. Pra. Shaale, Kasaragodu, Koduge: Ramanna Rai (2018)	Ondalla Eradalla (2018)

B. Ajaneesh Loknath chronology
Nannu Dochukunduvate (2018)	Sarkari Hi. Pra. Shaale, Kasaragodu, Koduge: Ramanna Rai (2018)	Bell Bottom (2019)

Vasuki Vaibhav has composed the songs and B. Ajaneesh Loknath has composed background score for the film. The lyrics for the songs are written by K. Kalyan, Trilok Trivikrama, Avinash Balekkala, Veeresh Shivamurthy and Vasuki Vaibhav.

Track list
No.	Title	Lyrics	Singer(s)	Length
1.	"Karavalli Song"	Vasuki Vaibhav	Vijay Prakash	03:21
2.	"Arere Avala Naguva"	Trilok Trivikrama	Vasuki Vaibhav	03:28
3.	"Nooraaru Bannagalu"	K. Kalyan	Madhuri Sheshadri	02:51
4.	"He Sharade"	K. Kalyan	Asha, Sunidhi	03:00
5.	"Dadda"	Trilok Trivikrama	Vasuki Vaibhav	02:53
6.	"Balloon Song"	Veeresh Shivamurthy, Trilok Trivikrama, Gokul Abhishek	Shishu Taansen Jnaneshwar	03:29
7.	"Aleyo Alege Eega (Pathos Song)"	Vasuki Vaibhav	Venkatesh D C	03:22

== Release ==
More than 3,000 students were reported to have watched the film at Kasargod. The Kannada Sangha members of Chandigarh made it possible to play the Kannada state anthem before the screening of the movie. It was reported that the movie had the highest ticket sales in Mumbai compared to any Kannada movie released there earlier. It was also the first Kannada movie to be released after 12 years in Thiruvananthapuram (two centres) and in Vizag (one centre) and the first Kannada movie to have its posters spread over 12 areas in Chennai.

== Reception ==
The movie has received predominately positive reviews.

Sunayana Suresh of The Times of India rated the film 3.5/5 stars and wrote, "Sarkari Hi. Pra. Shaale Kasaragodu, Koduge: Ramanna Rai is not an edgy commercial film, but it does have scenes that have an edge over the run-of-the-mill tales. If the narrative was a little tighter, it could have been nearly flawless." A critic from The New Indian Express gave it 3.5/5 stars and wrote, "The director of Ricky and Kirik Party definitely deserves a shout-out for his brave attempt and neat execution. However, some unnecessary scenes tend to dilute the serious tone and stretch the film. A tighter edit would have ensured a better impact." Shyam Prasad S. of Bangalore Mirror gave it 2.5/5 stars and wrote, "The actors are natural and real, the issue important and the effort sincere. But in the end it is the film that should be able to make an impact. It sputters."

== Box office ==
The movie got positive response from both audience and critics. It completed 100 days in theatres and was a blockbuster hit.

== Satellite rights ==
The satellite and digital rights were secured by Udaya TV and Sun NXT where the film had its World Television Premiere on 23 December 2018 at 6:00 p.m. IST

== Awards ==
Award	Category	Recipient	Result	Ref.
66th National Film Awards	Best Children's Film	Rishab Shetty	Won	
2018 Karnataka State Film Awards	Best Family Entertainer.	Rishab Shetty	Won	
66th Filmfare Awards South	Best Film	Rishab Shetty	Nominated	
66th Filmfare Awards South	Best Director	Rishab Shetty	Nominated	
66th Filmfare Awards South	Best Music Director	Vasuki Vaibhav	Won	
66th Filmfare Awards South	Best Lyricist	Trilok Trivikram ("Praveena Praveena")	Nominated	
66th Filmfare Awards South	Best Playback Singer – Female	Madhuri Sheshadri ("Nooraru Bannagalu")	Nominated	
8th South Indian International Movie Awards	Best Movie	Rishab Shetty	Nominated	
8th South Indian International Movie Awards	Best Director	Rishab Shetty	Nominated	
8th South Indian International Movie Awards	Best Cinematographer	Venkatesh Anguraj	Nominated	
8th South Indian International Movie Awards	Best Actor	Anant Nag	Nominated	
8th South Indian International Movie Awards	Best Actor in a Negative Role	Balakrishna. P	Nominated	
8th South Indian International Movie Awards	Best Comedian	Prakash Thuminad	Won	
8th South Indian International Movie Awards	Best Music Director	Vasuki Vaibhav	Nominated	
8th South Indian International Movie Awards	Best Lyricist	K. Kalyan ("Hey Sharadhe")	Nominated	
8th South Indian International Movie Awards	Best Male Playback Singer	Vasuki Vaibhav ("Dadda Song")	Nominated	
8th South Indian International Movie Awards	Best Female Playback Singer	Asha – "Hey Sharadhe"	Nominated	
