= Karnataka State Film Award for Best Family Entertainer =

Indian film award

Karnataka State Film Award for Best Entertaining Film
- State award for contributions to Kannada cinema
- Awarded for: Best Popular Film Of The Year
- Sponsored by: Government of Karnataka
- Rewards: Silver Medal; ₹50,000
- First award: 2011
- Final award: 2021
- Most recent winner: Yuvarathnaa

Highlights
- Total awarded: 11
- First winner: Saarathi

Karnataka State Film Award for Best Family Entertainer is a film award of the Indian state of Karnataka given during the annual Karnataka State Film Awards.

== Recipients ==
The following is the list of Award-winning films for the Karnataka State Best Family Entertainer award.

List of award recipients, showing the year and film(s)
Year	Film	Producer	Director	Ref.
2011	Saarathi	K. V. Sathya Prakash	Dinakar Thoogudeepa	
2012	Kranthiveera Sangolli Rayanna	Anand Appugol	Naganna	
2013	Charminar	Sri Siddeshwara Enterprises	R. Chandru	
2014	Gajakesari	• Jayanna • Bhogendra	S. Krishna	
2015	Krishna Leela	Ajay Rao	Shashank	
2016	Kirik Party	• Rakshit Shetty • G. S. Guptha	Rishab Shetty	
2017	Raajakumara	Hombale Films	Santhosh Ananddram	
2018	Sa.Hi.Pra.Shaale, Kasaragodu, Koduge: Ramanna Rai	Rishab Shetty	Rishab Shetty	
2019	India vs England	Y. N. Shankaregowda	Nagathihalli Chandrashekar	
2020	Fourwalls	T. Vishwanath Naik	S. S. Rajan	
2021	Yuvarathnaa	Vijay Kiragandur	Santhosh Ananddram	

== See also ==
- Karnataka State Film Awards
