= Fourwalls =

- poster
- Directed by: S S Sajjan
- Produced by: T. Vishwanath Naik
- Starring: Achyuth Kumar; Dattanna; Sujay Shastri; Dr.Pavitra; Baskar Ninasam; Dr.Janvi Jyothi
- Cinematography: Vadde Devendra Reddy
- Edited by: Satish Chandraiah
- Music by: Anand Rajavikram
- Production company: SV Pictures
- Release date: 11 February 2022
- Country: India
- Language: Kannada

Fourwalls is a 2022 Indian Kannada family drama film written and directed by S S Sajjan. The film is produced by T. Vishwanath Naik under SV Pictures Banner. The movie features Achyuth Kumar, Dattanna, Sujay Shastri, Dr.Pavitra, Baskar Ninasam & Dr.Janvi Jyothi in prominent roles. Anand Rajavikram has composed the music and background score, editing by Satish Chandraiah and cinematography by Vadde Devendra Reddy.

The film won Karnataka State Film Award for Best Family Entertainer which was announced in March 2025.

== Plot ==
Shankranna, born in a poor family, moves to the city with his family. His life is filled with many ups and downs that lay between life and death, incidences of success and failure, love and trust, and practices and belief in life.

== Cast ==
- Achyuth Kumar as Shankranna
- Dattanna as Mavayya
- Sujay Shastri as Ramanna
- Dr.Pavitra as Parvati
- Baskar Ninasam as Surya
- Dr.Janvi Jyothi as Geetha
- Rachana Dashrath as Kumuda
- Shankar Murthy SR as Kumar
- Shreya Shetty as Poorvi
- Anchal as Nandini
- Vikas Naik as Raja
- T Vishwanath Naik as Prakash
- Durgaprasad CS as Koddaddi
- Mahantesh Sajjan
- Dilip B M as Dilip
- Sanjeeva as Mudre

== Production ==
The film team released special teaser in August 2021 on occasion of Achyuth Kumar birthday. This film marks Achyuth Kumar’s debut as lead actor. The crew had to recreate the 1980s feel for some sequences in the movie. The film team shot at old HMT factory as well around old houses on outskirts of Bengaluru. Natural colors were used, giving the period an authentic touch. The plot of film revolves around love, family, and emotional themes that did not require vivid colors.

== Release and reception ==
The film was theatrically released on 11 February 2022 and opened to good reviews from critics and audience.

The critic of Times of India wrote that the Fourwalls story will strongly connect with father and daughters especially girls who were raised by a stern father.

== Soundtrack ==
Four Walls

Soundtrack album by Anand Rajavikram
- Genre: Feature film soundtrack
- Language: Kannada
- Label: Anand Audio

The film's music and background score is composed by Anand Rajavikram, the retro track Kanmaniye rendered by Vijay Prakash and picturized in 1980s style was a viral hit. The music rights were acquired by Anand Audio.

Tracklist
| No. | Title | Lyrics | Singer(s) | Length |
|---|---|---|---|---|
| 1. | "Kanmaniye" | Shree Talageri | Vijay Prakash | 4:41 |
| 2. | "Appayya" | Naveen Kumar, SS Sajjan | Supriyaa Ram | 5:08 |
