= Garuda Gamana Vrishabha Vahana =

- Theatrical release date poster
- Directed by: Raj B. Shetty
- Written by: Raj B. Shetty
- Produced by: Ravi Rai Kalasa; Vachan Shetty
- Starring: Raj B. Shetty; Rishab Shetty
- Narrated by: Gopalkrishna Deshpande
- Cinematography: Praveen Shriyan
- Edited by: Praveen Shriyan
- Music by: Midhun Mukundan
- Production companies: Lighter Buddha Films; Coffee Gang Studios
- Distributed by: KRG Studios
- Release date: 19 November 2021
- Running time: 151 minutes
- Country: India
- Language: Kannada
- Budget: ₹1.80 crores
- Box office: ₹7.85 crore

Garuda Gamana Vrishabha Vahana (transl. One mounts Garuda, One mounts Vrishabha) is a 2021 Indian Kannada-language neo-noir gangster film written and directed by actor-director Raj B. Shetty. The film is produced by Ravi Rai Kalasa and Vachan Shetty, under the Lighter Buddha Films banner. The film features Raj B. Shetty and Rishab Shetty in the lead roles. The music was scored by Midhun Mukundan. Both editing and cinematography were done by Praveen Shriyan. It was presented by Rakshit Shetty's Paramvah Studios.

== Plot ==
Brahmaiah is a mild-mannered and upright police officer who is transferred to Mangaladevi, a coastal town in Mangalore plagued by gang violence. The local underworld is dominated by the formidable gangster duo, Hari and Shiva. While Hari is a local, Shiva's origins are a mystery; he was discovered at age twelve inside a bag dumped in a well, surviving with a slashed neck and severe scars. Adopted by Hari's mother, Shiva grew up as Hari’s fiercely loyal brother. Deeply traumatized by childhood abuse, Shiva suffers from severe anger issues and reacts violently to any threat against his loved ones, a trait Hari exploits to build an untouchable criminal empire. Over the years, Hari transitions into a suave, politically connected kingpin, while Shiva remains an unsophisticated, silent enforcer.

Their brotherhood begins to fracture when Hari aligns himself with a powerful senior gangster and businessman, Raviraj, to elevate his status. Feeling neglected and sidelined by Hari's new allegiance, Shiva begins acting out, instigating needless street fights. Viewing Shiva's unpredictable rage as a liability, Hari begins to distance himself from his brother. The rift deepens when Shiva violently attacks Raviraj’s brother-in-law over a minor dispute. In response, Hari alienates Shiva further, prompting Raviraj's faction to quietly plot Shiva's assassination. Meanwhile, Brahmaiah, who had initially wanted to flee the violent town, gains newfound resolve after being humiliated by a local MLA who demands the destruction of both Hari and Shiva.

Brahmaiah recruits a police driver to act as a double agent, feeding conflicting information to play the rival factions against one another. When Brahmaiah catches wind of Raviraj’s hit on Shiva, he maliciously leaks the information to Shiva's crew, claiming that Hari ordered the hit. Shiva is rescued by his friends at the last second, but the false revelation that his brother betrayed him leaves him devastated. Believing the lie, Shiva’s friends launch a retaliatory strike to assassinate Hari that same night. The attempt fails, and Hari kills one of the attackers. Under the impression that Shiva initiated the hit on him, an enraged Hari publicly vows to execute Shiva and parade his victory through the town.

Shiva retaliates against the syndicate by killing Raviraj's brother-in-law. Left with no choice, Hari allies fully with Raviraj and sends a hitman to execute Shiva, who is shot dead while playing cricket with local neighborhood boys. With his rival eliminated, Hari embarks on his celebratory victory lap through the town. However, his triumph is short-lived; the traumatized teenage boys who witnessed Shiva's murder stalk Hari and assassinate him using his own knife. In a surreal epilogue, the childhood spirits of Hari and Shiva are shown burying their adult bodies, reunited in death.

== Cast ==
- Raj B. Shetty as Shiva
  - Harshadeep as young Shiva
- Rishab Shetty as Hari
  - Chinthan as young Hari
- Gopalkrishna Deshpande as S.I. Brahmaiyya
- Anil Uppala as Pili Prakasha
- V.J. Vineeth as Shreeshanth, Pili Prakasha's nephew.
- Jyothish Shetty as Raviraj
- Deepak Rai Paanaaje as Shekhara
- Shanil Guru as Karunakar, Police driver
- Prakash Thuminad as Ramanath
- J. P. Thuminad as Avinash
- Arpith Adyar as Avinash's friend
- Yathish Baikampady as Emmekere Dayananda
- Sachin Anchan
- Saumesh
- R.J. Arpith Indravadan

== Symbolism ==
Garuda Gamana refers to Vishnu (or Hari) who travels on Garuda. Vrishaba Vahana refers to Shiva, who has Nandi as his Vahana. Thus the title refers to both Vishnu and Shiva, along with their mounts, while the narrator's character of Brahmaiyya represents Brahma of the divine Hindu Trinity.

== Soundtrack ==
Midhun Mukundan composed the background score for the film and the soundtracks. The lyrics for the soundtracks "Chandrachooda" and "Sojugada Soojumallige" were adopted from Purandara Dasa's work and a popular folk song respectively - retaining the original titles. The album consists of 4 soundtracks.

No.	Title	Lyrics	Singer(s)	Length
1.	"Demon In Me"	Manek D'Silva	Anjali Sankaran, Rakshita Rao	2:19
2.	"Endo Bareda"	Pavan Bhat	Vasuki Vaibhav	3:55
3.	"Sojugada Soojumallige"	Janapada	Chaithra J Achar, Midhun Mukundan	2:47
4.	"Chandrachooda"	Purandara Dasa	Siddhartha Belmannu	2:52
Total length:				11:53

== Legacy ==
Garuda Gamana Vrishabha Vahana was included in the FC Gold list of films by Film Companion, where it positively impacted Raj B. Shetty's career, as everyone praised his acting skills. The film was released on ZEE5 and achieved more than 8 crore minutes of viewing within 3 days of its release on the OTT. It remained in the national top 10 movies for more than two weeks since its release on ZEE5.

The film also received praise from other prominent celebrities like Anurag Kashyap, Rana Daggubati, Ajay Rao, Nidhi Subbaiah, Ramya, Ram Gopal Varma, Sudeepa, Prashanth Neel and Shivarajkumar for the direction, story and technical aspects. Gautham Vasudev Menon bought the remake rights and planned to remake it in Tamil and Telugu.

== Awards and nominations ==
Award	Category	Recipient	Result	Ref.
Critics' Choice Movie Awards	Best Feature Film	Lighter Buddha Films	Nominated	
Critics' Choice Movie Awards	Best Director - Feature Film	Raj B. Shetty	Nominated	
Critics' Choice Movie Awards	Best Writing - Feature Film	Raj B. Shetty	Nominated	
Critics' Choice Movie Awards	Best Actor - Feature Film	Raj B. Shetty	Nominated	
Critics' Choice Movie Awards	Best Supporting Actor - Feature Film	Rishab Shetty	Nominated	
Critics' Choice Movie Awards	Best Cinematography - Feature Film	Praveen Shriyan	Nominated	
Critics' Choice Movie Awards	Best Editing - Feature Film	Praveen Shriyan	Nominated	
10th South Indian International Movie Awards	SIIMA Award for Best Film – Kannada	Lighter Buddha Films	Won	
10th South Indian International Movie Awards	Best Director	Raj B. Shetty	Nominated	
10th South Indian International Movie Awards	Best Actor	Rishab Shetty	Nominated	
10th South Indian International Movie Awards	Best Supporting Actor	Gopalkrishna Deshpande	Nominated	
10th South Indian International Movie Awards	Best Actor in a Negative Role	Raj B. Shetty	Nominated	
10th South Indian International Movie Awards	Best Music Director	Midhun Mukundan	Nominated	
10th South Indian International Movie Awards	Best Cinematographer	Praveen Shriyan	Nominated	
10th South Indian International Movie Awards	Best Female Playback Singer	Chaithra J Achar - "Sojugada Soojumallige"	Won	
67th Filmfare Awards South	Best Film	Ravi Rai Kalasa, Vachan Shetty	Nominated	
67th Filmfare Awards South	Best Director	Raj B. Shetty	Won	
67th Filmfare Awards South	Best Actor	Raj B. Shetty	Nominated	
67th Filmfare Awards South	Best Actor	Rishab Shetty	Nominated	
