= Keradi =

- Village
- Location in Karnataka, India
- Coordinates: 13.747276955492596°N 74.83960195397572°E
- Country: India
- State: Karnataka
- District: Udupi

Government
  - Body: Gram panchayat

Population (2011)
  - Total: 2,574

Languages
  - Official: Kannada
- Time zone: UTC+5:30 (IST)
- Postal code: 576233
- ISO 3166 code: IN-KA
- Vehicle registration: KA
- Website: karnataka.gov.in

Keradi is a village in Kundapur Taluk of Udupi district in the southern state of Karnataka, India. The village falls in an Eco-Sensitive Zone close to the Mookambika Wildlife Sanctuary.

== Demographics ==
As of the 2011 Census of India, Keradi had 512 households and a population of 2574 with 1244 males and 1330 females. Of the population, 1670 people were literate.

== Makkala Panchayat ==
A unique initiative was taken up by the children of the village aged between 6 and 18, to address the issue of alcoholism, which was widespread among the men of the village. They formed a Makkala Panchayat (children's local council), which worked with the Gram panchayat (village council) and institutionalised the role of children in local decision-making. The Makkala Panchayat successfully reduced alcoholism through education, empowerment and tactful political manoeuvring. The children collected empty sachets of arrack from near the arrack shops and calculated that as much as Rs 1.2 million per year was being spent on it by the villages. They presented their findings to the Taluk Panchayat and the villagers. Seeing the huge financial cost, there was a unanimous call to take action, after which the unlicensed vendors were shut down. The children involved in the initiative have gone ahead to contribute towards tackling other social issues related to child marriage, child labour, migrant families, female feticide, and HIV/AIDS.

The Panchayati Raj ministry of the Government of Karnataka has acknowledged and institutionalised this effort and made it a requirement for all panchayats in the state to offer a venue for children to voice their concerns to elected officials.

== In popular culture ==
The Kannada language film Kantara is set in Keradi and was also filmed there. The prequel film Kantara: Chapter 1 is also filmed there.

== See also ==
- Udupi
- Districts of Karnataka
- Kundapura
