= Kantara (2022 film) =

2022 Indian film by Rishab Shetty

Kantara: A Legend
- Theatrical release poster
- Directed by: Rishab Shetty
- Written by: Rishab Shetty; Anirudh Mahesh; Shanil Goutham; Raj B. Shetty; Sham Prasad; Prakash Tuminad
- Produced by: Vijay Kiragandur; Chaluve Gowda
- Starring: Rishab Shetty; Sapthami Gowda; Kishore; Achyuth Kumar
- Cinematography: Arvind S. Kashyap
- Edited by: K. M. Prakash; Shobith Shetty; Pratheek Shetty
- Music by: B. Ajaneesh Loknath
- Production company: Hombale Films
- Distributed by: Hombale Films
- Release date: 30 September 2022
- Running time: 148 minutes
- Country: India
- Language: Kannada
- Budget: ₹16 crore
- Box office: ₹400−450 crore (Note: India Today, The Times of India, Firstpost, The Financial Express, Times Now, ABP News, Asianet, DNA – reported the collections to be ₹400 crore, other sources – Hindustan Times, WION, Outlook, The New Indian Express, Dainik Bhaskar, Udayavani and PTC Punjabi have reported it to be around ₹450 crore.)

Kantara (transl. Mysterious forest, also known as Kantara: A Legend) is a 2022 Indian Kannada-language mythological action drama film written and directed by Rishab Shetty, and produced by Vijay Kiragandur and Chaluve Gowda under Hombale Films. The film stars Rishab Shetty in a dual roles as Kaadubettu Shiva and Annappa, along with Sapthami Gowda, Kishore, and Achyuth Kumar.

Blending elements of coastal Karnataka's folklore of the Tulu people, spirit possession rituals, and divine belief systems, the story centres around Bhuta Kola, a traditional form of worship practiced in the region. It follows a Kambala champion who clashes with an upright forest officer, leading to a larger conflict involving sacred land, ancestral legacy, and the balance between nature and man-made law.

Set and filmed in Keradi in coastal Karnataka, principal photography began in August 2021. The cinematography was handled by Arvind S. Kashyap, with music composed by B. Ajaneesh Loknath. The action sequences were choreographed by Vikram More, and the production design handled by debutant Dharani Gange Putra.

The film was released on 30 September 2022 to critical acclaim, with praise for its cast's performance (particularly of Shetty and Kishore), direction, background score, and portrayal of native mythology and traditions. It became one of the highest-grossing Kannada films of all time. A prequel, titled Kantara: Chapter 1, was released on 2 October 2025.

The film was featured at the 54th International Film Festival of India in the Indian Panorama section, where it won the Silver Peacock - Special Jury Award. At the 70th National Film Awards, Rishab Shetty won the Best Actor Award and the film received the Best Popular Film Award.

== Plot ==
In 1847, a king in coastal Karnataka, despite living with his devoted wife and children, finds himself spiritually unfulfilled. Seeking inner peace, he embarks on a journey to self-discovery and encounters a sacred stone in a forest, inhabited by the demigod Panjurli, guardian of the local villagers. The king offers a significant portion of his land to the villagers in exchange for taking the holy stone with him. Panjurli warns through a human medium that his companion, the ferocious demigod Guliga, will not forgive any betrayal of his promise.

In 1970, a descendent of the king demands the return of the land from Annappa, a Bhoota Kola performer possessed by Panjurli. Annappa asserts that the land rightfully belongs to the villagers and warns that any attempt to challenge this claim will invoke divine retribution. When questioned whether the warning comes from him or Panjurli, Annappa cryptically suggests that if he is merely human, he will reappear, but if it is Panjurli, he will not. He then vanishes into a circle of the fire in the forest, and subsequently, the king's descendent dies on the steps of the courthouse.

Twenty years later, in 1990, forest officer Murali is assigned to convert the villagers' land into a forest reserve. He encounters opposition from Kaadubettu Shiva, a Kambala athlete and son of the missing Annappa. Shiva is supported by the village landlord, Devendra Suttooru, a descendent of the king. Despite repeated requests, Shiva refuses to perform the Bhoota Kola due to the trauma of his father's disappearance, delegating the ritual to his cousin, Guruva.

Murali and his team begin erecting a fence along the designated reserve, and Shiva falls in love with his childhood friend, Leela, whom he helps secure a position as a forest guard. Conflict arises when the villagers attempt to halt the fencing, and police and forest guards, including Leela, violently suppress them, creating a tension between Shiva and Leela though she is compelled to follow the orders.

As the conflict between Shiva and Murali escalates, Murali attempts to arrest Shiva and his friends, but his jeep is crushed by a tree being felled by Shiva, leaving him gravely injured. Shiva and his friends go into hiding, returning to the village days later. He reconciles with Leela and resolves to surrender, yet the group is apprehended by the police the following morning. Meanwhile, Devendra secretly offers Guruva a bribe to impersonate Panjurli during the next Bhoota Kola and coerce the villagers into surrendering their land, which Guruva refuses, resulting in his murder.

Shiva discovers the truth about Guruva's death from his friend Mahadeva, a witness, and retaliates against Devendra's henchmen. Murali informs the villagers about Devendra's scheme, prompting Shiva and Murali to unite the community. Devendra and his forces launch a violent attack, resulting the deaths of several villagers. During the confrontation, Shiva strikes his head against Guliga's sacred stone and becomes possessed by the demigod, gaining supernatural strength and eliminating Devendra and his henchmen.

Months later, Shiva performs the Bhoota Kola ritual and is possessed by Panjurli. During the performance, Shiva, Murali and the villagers join hands in a symbolic gesture of unity, following which Shiva vanishes into the forest after an apparent encounter with his father's spirit, leaving behind a pregnant Leela. In a mid-credits scene, Shiva and Leela's young son inquires Shiva's friend about his father's disappearance, prompting him to recount the story.

== Cast ==
- Rishab Shetty in dual roles as
  - Kaadubettu Shiva, a Kambala athlete and Annappa's son
  - Annappa, Kaadubettu Shiva's father
- Sapthami Gowda as Leela
- Kishore as Murali, a Deputy Range Forest Officer (D.R.F.O)
- Achyuth Kumar as Devendra Suttooru
- Pramod Shetty as Sudhakara
- Prakash Thuminad as Raampa
- Manasi Sudhir as Kamala, Shiva's mother
- Naveen D. Padil as Lawyer
- Suchan Shetty as Ravi
- Swaraj Shetty as Guruva, Shiva's cousin
- Deepak Rai Panaaje as Sundara
- Shanil Gautham as Bulla
- Pradeep Shetty as Mohana
- Rakshith Ramachandra Shetty as Devendra's henchman
- Prabhakar Kundar as Madhavacharya
- Chandrakala Rao as Sheela, Sundara's wife
- Sukanya as Ammakka, Devendra's wife
- Sathish Acharya as Tabara, Leela's father
- Pushparaj Bollar as Garnall Abbu
- Raghu Pandeshwar as Raghu, Forest Officer
- Mime Ramdas as Naaru
- Basuma Kodagu as Guruva's father
- Ranjan Saju as Lacchu
- Rajeev Shetty as Rajeev Bhandari
- Shine Shetty as Devendra's father
- Vinay Biddappa as the King
- Pragathi Rishab Shetty as the King's wife
- Atish Shetty as Devendra's specially-abled son
- Radhakrishna Kumbale as a native resident
- Naveen Bondel as Demigod Interpreter

== Production ==
=== Development ===
Director Rishab Shetty cited the conflict between nature and human beings as the theme of the film, while adding specifically that the strife between forest officers and the inhabitants in his hometown Keradi, Karnataka, in the 1990s, as the source of inspiration for the film. He further added, "It is a film from our land, from our roots, stories that are heard through generations, untapped and deeply rooted to our culture". Shetty conceived the story in 2021 during the COVID-19 lockdown. Elaborating on the title of the film, he said, "Kantara is a mysterious forest and this is a story that happens around the area... The film title has a tagline calling it a dhanta kathe or a legend. I did not want to give the film a straight or direct title. The word is not used often. While it has Sanskrit origins, it is used in Kannada too. It is used in Yakshagana too, where we call a very mysterious forest Kantara".

=== Filming ===
The film had to present three timelines: 1847, 1970s and 1990s. Since many references through books were not available, the makers took the help of the tribes residing in Keradi where it was also filmed. Costume designer Pragathi Shetty stated that the makers "travelled the entire village and met the tribal community, who gave details about their dress". She added, "We had most of the junior artists roped in from Kundapura, and it was a challenge for me to convince them to wear tribal costumes. We also took reference to design the costume for the forest guard, played by Sapthami Gowda. We heard each year, the colour of the uniform would change, and everything, including the badges was customised". Filming took place in four forest locations in the area which included a set being built reflecting the 1990s. Art director Darani Gangeputra said, "A lot of natural sources were used to create the setups", further adding, "apart from this, we created a school, temple, and a tree house. We had 35 people from Bangalore and 15 people from the Keradi village, who helped us to study the culture". The set involved a village, including rustic homes with cowsheds, coops for hens, courtyards, areca plantations and an authentic Kambala racetrack. Shetty learned about the intricacies of Kambala and trained for four months before performing the sequence for the film in early 2022.

== Music ==
The music of the film was composed by B. Ajaneesh Loknath. Alongside him, 30–40 musicians were brought in. Mostly involving folk music represented using Jaanapada songs using traditional instruments, the team took was assisted by Mime Ramdas. Songs usually sung by common people during crop harvest and those popular among the tribals of the area were used as a part of the album and the background score.

The band Thaikkudam Bridge filed a lawsuit against the filmmakers, claiming the song "Varaha Roopam" was plagiarised from the band's song "Navarasam". When the film was released on Amazon Prime, the song was modified with a new orchestral arrangement and vocals while the lyrics remained the same. The case was quashed by the Kerala High Court in 2023 after the parties involved reached a private settlement, and the original song was returned to the movie.

== Release ==
=== Theatrical ===
Kantara was released in theatres in Kannada on 30 September 2022 in more than 250 theatres across Karnataka, and simultaneously in the US, UK, Europe, Middle East and Australia among other places globally. After the success in Kannada, the makers announced that the film will be dubbed in Telugu, Hindi, Tamil and Malayalam languages and was released on 14 October 2022 in Hindi and 15 October 2022 in Telugu and Tamil. Though the Hindi version was announced to be released in over 800 screens across the country, later it was reported to be released in 2500 screens in the Hindi version. Following a social media campaign based on the film's connection to Tulu culture, a Tulu language dub of the film was announced, with a release date of 25 November 2022 outside of India and 2 December in India. It became the first Kannada movie to be released in Vietnam.

=== Home media ===
The satellite rights of the film were acquired by Star India Network for the Kannada, Tamil, Telugu, Malayalam and Tulu languages. The rights of the Hindi version were acquired by Sony Max. The digital rights of the film were secured by Amazon Prime Video, and was digitally streamed from 24 November 2022 in Kannada, Telugu, Malayalam, Tamil languages. The Hindi version was streamed on Netflix from 9 December 2022, and was also announced by the platform that an English dubbed version of the film will be available for streaming in January 2023, but delayed it to 1 March 2023.

== Reception ==
=== Box office ===
The first day net collection was estimated to be 3.5–4.25 crore with a gross of around ₹6 crore. The first weekend gross collection was reported to be ₹22.3 crore (with net collection of around 19 crore to ₹23 crore). The estimated first week gross earning was reported to be around ₹38–50 crore. The footfalls across Karnataka was estimated to be more than 19 lakh in the first week of its release. The footfalls of the film was estimated to be around 40 lakhs by the time it grossed ₹60 crore. On its second Tuesday, the film was reported to have higher domestic net collections than both Ponniyin Selvan: I and Godfather. Kantara also earned more than these films in Karnataka. The film was reported to have collected over ₹70 crore in Karnataka alone by the end of the second week.

The film's success extended beyond traditional markets. In North America, the movied collected $2.5 million, surpassing several Bollywood releases at that time. Middle East Kantara generated $3.7 million in ticket sales, and in Australia/New Zealand the film's collection reached $800,000 within three weeks

The film crossed the ₹100 crore mark within 15–17 days. The film collected ₹36.5 crore in its third weekend. The film crossed the ₹150 crore mark in 18 days. The movie grossed ₹170 crore including ₹150 crore in India and 111 crores in Karnataka. The movie grossed ₹170.05 to ₹175 crores at the end of three weeks. The worldwide gross was reported to be ₹188 crores with ₹170 in India alone and ₹32 crores in the fourth weekend. The film collected US$1 million in North America and 200K AUD in Australia, thereby becoming the first Kannada film to achieve those landmarks. With a footfall of ₹77 lakhs in less than 4 weeks, it became the most viewed film in Karnataka among all the films produced by Hombale Films. The film crossed the ₹200 crore mark in 25 days with a gross collection of ₹211.5 crore, including ₹196.95 crore from India alone. The film grossed ₹126 crores in Karnataka.

The film crossed the ₹250 crore mark in less than a month of its release. The domestic net collections of all the versions crossed ₹200 crore in 30 days. The film grossed ₹1.06 crore at the UK box office. The movie grossed ₹280 crore in 30 days. The footfalls crossed 80 lakhs in 32 days in Karnataka alone. The movie crossed the 300 crore gross collection milestone in 33 days. The movie grossed ₹325 crore worldwide in 36 days. The movie was reported to have grossed around ₹350 to ₹355 crores in 41 days with a footfall of more than 1 crore in Karnataka alone. The movie was reported to have grossed ₹360 crores in 44 days. The collections of the non-Hindi version was reported to be ₹280 crores at the end of six weeks. While the collections in Karnataka reached ₹180 crore, the domestic gross collections reached ₹275 crores. The movie was reported to have collected around ₹370 to ₹377 crores at the end of 50-day theatrical run. Its seventh week collection of ₹24 crores was the highest for an Indian movie surpassing ₹11 crores collected by Baahubali 2: The Conclusion in its seventh week. The worldwide gross collections crossed the 400 crore mark in 53 days. The domestic collections of the movie was reported to be the third highest of the year 2022. The movie completed 50-day theatrical run in Australia, United Kingdom, Canada, United Arab Emirates and United States. India's largest Hindi language newspaper Dainik Bhaskar reported the collections to be ₹446 crores at the end of 68 days. The movie crossed the ₹450 crores mark in 74 days. Udayavani reported the collections to have breached the ₹500 crore mark.

==== Telugu version ====
The Telugu version grossed ₹5 crore on its first day. The Telugu version grossed ₹21.15 crore in its first week. The Telugu version grossed ₹28 crore in 10 days. The Telugu version also grossed ₹9 crore in 4 days (from 21 to 24 October) outperforming other Diwali releases. The movie collected ₹50.30 crore in 25 days run from the Telugu states. The Telugu version grossed ₹60 crore in 39 days with a net collection of ₹42 crore during the same period.

==== Hindi version ====
The first-day net collection of the Hindi version was reported to be around ₹1.27–1.5 crore. The first-weekend collection of the Hindi version was ₹8 crore. The movie earned nett collections of ₹15 crore in the Hindi version at the end of its first week run. The net collections of the Hindi version was ₹29.1 crore in 13 days, crossing the lifetime domestic net collections of the Hindi version of Ponniyin Selvan: I. The nett collections of the Hindi version was ₹31.7 crore at the end of two weeks. The nett collections of the Hindi version at the end of 3 weeks was ₹51.50 crore. The movie collected ₹2.10 crore on its fourth Friday which was higher than the three new Hindi releases of that week. Despite the film running for three weeks, it saw its highest ever box office number (₹4.5 crore) on its fourth Sunday, taking the total nett collections to ₹62.40 crore at the end of 24 days. At the end of four weeks, it collected ₹69.75 crore nett. At the end of five weeks, it collected ₹79.25 crore nett. The Hindi version grossed ₹96 crore in 39 days with a nett collections of ₹82 crore. Its gross of ₹12.7 crore in the eighth week was the highest grossing eighth week collection for a Hindi movie breaking the 21-year-old record of Gadar: Ek Prem Katha (2001) which had grossed ₹7 crore in its eighth week. It earned 80 times its first day net collections – the highest for a dubbed movie.

=== Critical reception ===
On the review aggregator website Rotten Tomatoes, 83% of six critics' reviews are positive, with an average rating of 7.9/10.

Muralidhara Khajane of The Hindu wrote "Rishab Shetty succeeds in meticulously bringing a tale of myths, legends and superstition, and that too in his native dialect". He commended the acting performances of Shetty and Kishore, and further wrote, "The locations are colourful and vivid, and the background music by B. Ajaneesh Loknath represents the ethos of the land. Cinematographer Arvind S Kashyap's meditative shots showcase the native culture and capture the rustic locales in their grandeur. The filming of the Kambala sequences... is testimony to his brilliant takes". A. Sharadhaa of The New Indian Express called the film "a compelling revenge-action drama with a neat blend of crime and divinity". Sridevi S. of The Times of India called the film "a visual grandeur" and rated the film 4/5, commending the acting performances while writing that the "biggest take away is the pre-climax and climax, which is conceived and performed to perfection".

The reviewer for The News Minute stated that the film was presented by Shetty "in his self-referential tale in the garb of a masala film that is not only entertaining but also uncannily original". They wrote, "Rishab Shetty, the actor, is particularly effective in the film and that's because he is fully aware of the pitch and tone of his performance. He looks the right shape and size for a Kambala sportsman and exudes a fine balance of naivety and arrogance when it comes to the 'manly' side of his personality". However, they felt that the "writing falters a bit" in that "repetitive scenes dished out about... ideological differences" of the central characters. Priyanka Sundar of Firstpost rated the film 3.5/5 and praised the performance of Shetty while calling the music "also a star of the film that not only supports the narrative but elevates it as well". She criticized the portrayal of Leela, the love interest of the lead character as having "not really one-note" and that she was used as "an attractive lamppost".

Vivek M. V of Deccan Herald rated the film 3.5/5 and felt the same in relation to Leela's character, while adding that the plotline meant Kishore's performance was "forced to remain one-note". However, he felt the music and cinematography make it "a technical marvel". He further wrote, "Having shared the screen with gifted actors, it has taken a career-best effort from Rishab to emerge the best".

== Accolades ==
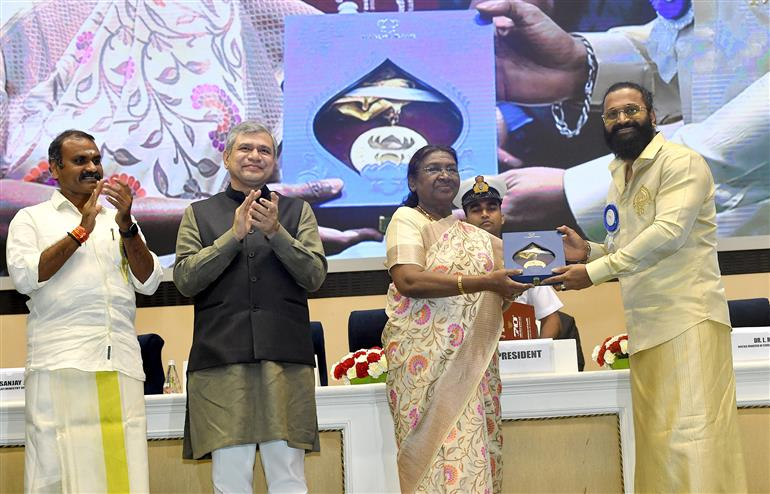
The President Droupadi Murmu confers the 'Rajat Kamal' to the Director & Actor Shri Rishab Shetty for Best Actor in a Leading Role for Kantara (Kannada) at the 70th National Film Awards ceremony at Vigyan Bhavan, in New Delhi on 8 October 2024

Year	Ceremony	Category	Recipient(s)	Result	Ref.
2024	National Film Awards	Best Actor	Rishab Shetty	Won	
2024	National Film Awards	Best Popular Film Providing Wholesome Entertainment	—N/a	Won	

== Legacy and impact ==
The Government of Karnataka, in response to the movie, has initiated a monthly allowance for Buta Kola performers who are above the age of 60.

== Prequel ==
It was said that in Mangalore, Shetty had sought the permission of the god Panjurli to film a prequel. The prequel titled Kantara: Chapter 1 began filming in November 2023. The first look was released on 27 November 2023. The film was released on 2 October 2025.

== Legal issues ==
The song "Varaha Roopam" face legal issues when the popular Kerala band Thaikkudam Bridge accused the makers of plagiarism. They claimed "Varaha Roopam" bore similarities to their song Navarasam and filed a lawsuit. The Kozhikode District Sessions Court imposed an interim injunction, temporarily barring the use of "Varaha Roopam" on streaming platforms without Thaikkudam Bridge's permission. The criminal proceedings were later quashed by the Kerala High Court pursuant to a settlement reached between the parties.
