= Kirik Party =

2016 Kannada film directed by Rishab Shetty

- Theatrical film poster
- Directed by: Rishab Shetty
- Written by: Rakshit Shetty; The Seven Odds (Note: The Seven Odds is the pen of seven writers together, namely, Rakshit Shetty, Rishab Shetty, Abhijith Mahesh, Dhananjay Ranjan, Kiranraj K and Chandrajith PB.)
- Produced by: Govind Sahai Guptha; Rakshit Shetty
- Starring: Rakshit Shetty; Rashmika Mandanna; Samyuktha Hegde; Achyuth Kumar
- Cinematography: Karm Chawla
- Edited by: Sachin B. Ravi
- Music by: B. Ajaneesh Loknath
- Production companies: Paramvah Studios; Pushkar Films
- Distributed by: Jayanna Films
- Release date: 30 December 2016
- Running time: 165 minutes
- Country: India
- Language: Kannada
- Budget: ₹4 crore
- Box office: est. ₹50 crore

Kirik Party is a 2016 Indian Kannada-language romantic comedy drama directed by Rishab Shetty and produced by Govind Sahai Guptha and Rakshit Shetty, under Paramvah Studios. It stars Rakshit Shetty, Rashmika Mandanna, Samyuktha Hegde, Achyuth Kumar, Aravinnd Iyer, Dhananjay Ranjan, Chandan Achar and Pramod Shetty play prominent roles. Rakshit Shetty wrote the story and co-wrote the script with a team called "The Seven Odds", which consisted of Rakshit Shetty, Rishab Shetty, Abhijith Mahesh, Dhananjay Ranjan, Kiranraj K, Chandrajith Belliappa. The film marks the acting debut of Rashmika Mandanna and Samyuktha Hegde.

The film marks the second directorial venture of Rishab Shetty after Ricky (2016). The principal photography commenced on 17 April 2016 at Malnad College of Engineering in Hassan and was completed in September 2016. Karm Chawla and Sachin Ravi handled the cinematography and editing, while the music was composed by B. Ajaneesh Loknath, which became viral upon its release.

Kirik Party was released worldwide on 30 December 2016 to positive reviews from critics and became one of the highest grossing Kannada films of all time and also had a 365-days run in multiplexes. It won the Karnataka State Film Award for Best Family Entertainer, and was nominated in seven categories at the 64th Filmfare Awards South, winning five of them. It also received five awards at the IIFA Utsavam and seven awards at the 6th South Indian International Movie Awards. The film was remade in Telugu as Kirrak Party (2018).

== Plot ==
The story begins with Karna, a first-year student at college, meeting Saanvi, a final year student and the daughter of a police officer. Saanvi is well-liked on campus, but she forms a close friendship with Karna. Saanvi is writing a book about a sex worker she knows personally, who ends up giving birth with Saanvi and Karna's help. The baby is named Saanvi, which deeply affects Karna emotionally. Over time, Karna and Saanvi grow closer and go out together. However, a tragic incident occurs when Saanvi falls from a hostel window and dies after drinking alcohol at a party. This event deeply affects Karna, leading him to become stubborn and rude in his final year. Arya, a junior, falls in love with Karna and tries to help him return to his former self. After a series of events and emotional encounters, Karna is able to come to terms with his past and move forward with Arya's support.

Karna, influenced by Arya's words, leaves on a bike journey, deciding to sell his car to fund a sex worker's child's education. During the trip, Karna realizes he is in love with Arya and returns to college. On his final day, Karna writes letters confessing to locking himself in the car and falsely accusing his friends, and expressing his love for Arya. Karna reunites with his friends, but the principal forgives them before reading the letter. At the send-off party, Arya reveals the truth to Karna and asks him to give the letter to the principal, not her. Karna mistakenly switches the letters, leading the principal to discover Karna's love for Arya, who is his daughter. In the end, the principal angrily confronts Karna for his actions. This chain of events showcases Karna's growth as he takes responsibility for his mistakes and faces the consequences, ultimately learning valuable lessons about honesty and love.

== Cast ==
- Rakshit Shetty as Karna
- Rashmika Mandanna as Saanvi Joseph
- Samyuktha Hegde as Aarya
- Achyuth Kumar as Ghouse
- Aravinnd Iyer as Lokesh Kumar
- Dhananjay Ranjan as Manjunath M.
- Ashwin Rao Pallaki as Ravi
- Shankar Murthy as Sankoch Murthy
- Chandan Achar as Alexander Gabriel
- Pramod Shetty as Jnanesh
- Rajath Kumar as Rajath
- Manjunath Gowda
- Giri Krishna
- Raghu Ramanakoppa
- Hanumanthegowda as Dr. Thontadarya
- K. S. Sridhar
- Raghu Pandeshwar as Watchman Narayana
- Dinesh Mangaluru as Karna's Father
- Salman Ahamed as Poovaiah
- Sriharsha Mayya
- Raghavendra N.
- Aishwarya Acchappa as Bhagya
- Surabhi
- Neetha Muralidhar Rao
- Arohitha Gowda as Sonu
- Paramesh as Ranna

== Production ==
=== Development ===
In February 2016, during the promotions of Ricky in Udupi, Rakshit Shetty announced that his next film would be Kirik Party and that Rishab Shetty, the director of the former, would again direct the film. He added that most of Ricky's crew would feature in the film except for Hariprriya, as the film demanded a "fresh female lead". He said that the film would be made in a budget of ₹4 crore. In an interview with The Times of India in December 2016, he said that he wrote the story about six years ago and was inspired from his "college experiences". He added, "Karna [his character in the film] is what I was like in college. He is actually a combination of mine and my best friends' characteristics. I was a naughty guy back then and have changed a lot since; I became serious after moving to Bengaluru".

=== Casting ===
"I got a call from the associate director asking me to audition for a Rakshit Shetty film, but I thought it was a prank! But he called me again after a few days and this time, I believed him. My p.u board exams were going on, but despite that, I went to Jayanagar for an audition. The door opened, and I was shocked to see Rakshit right in front of me. They explained the plot to me and I liked it. After I auditioned, they gave me the cheque and said ‘welcome to Kirik Party."

— Samyuktha Hegde, on landing the role in the film.

Rashmika Mandanna told Indiatimes about her entry to cinema industry "The makers of Kirik Party saw a picture of mine from the Clean & Clear Fresh Face of India 2014 competition — one in which I was dancing during the college round — and approached me to act in the film. So, it really got things going. I always wanted to be in films. I would watch actors receiving awards and thanking their parents in their acceptance speeches — that is something that I always wanted to do. But I honestly didn't think that I would bag such a big movie. I would just say that I'm lucky."

Auditions were held in March 2016 for the two female leads and supporting roles in the film, in Bangalore. The makers auditioned over 400 girls and went through 2,000 profiles for the two lead roles. Rashmika Mandanna, then, a model and a student pursuing her graduation, was signed to play the first female lead in the film. She was selected after the makers "liked" the pictures from her win at the Clean & Clear Fresh Face of India 2014 competition. The second role went to Samyukta Hegde, then a 17-year-old, also pursuing her graduation. Post auditions for the supporting roles to play sidekicks to Rakshit Shetty's character in the film, seven short film makers, writers, dialogue writers and technicians — Aravind Iyer, Ashwin Rao Pallakki, Shankar Murthy, Dhananjay Ranjan, Chandan, Rajath Kumar and Giri Krishna — were signed. Pramod Shetty, who had previously worked with Rakshit, was also signed.

=== Filming ===
Filming began on 17 April 2016 with a muhurat shot in Bangalore. It completed in September, with the final leg of the schedule filming a "journey song" for which the makers traveled to 15 places in four states of Karnataka, Andhra Pradesh, Maharashtra and Goa spanning 2,400 kilometers. A yellow Hindustan Contessa bearing the 3636 on the number plate was used in the film. Rishab Shetty conceived a mute character in the film and the car was used in the place after certain modifications. Elaborating on the role it plays in the film, he said, "It is not about just buying the car, but how they fall in love also makes this vehicle an important part of the film. The car even has a name, Kirik car." The makers spent over a month on finalizing on the "perfect car" before narrowing down on the Contessa "for its long looks". It was also used during the film's promotions following which it was auctioned to contribute for a "social cause".

== Soundtrack ==
The film has ten tracks composed by B. Ajaneesh Loknath, out of which only six were included in the soundtrack album which initially released on 26 November 2016. The makers later released the remaining tracks as an extended album on 24 December 2016. The soundtrack had lyrics written by Rakshit Shetty, Dhananjay Ranjan, Kiran Kaverappa and Veeresh Shivamurthy. Deciding to not tie up with any music label, the producers released the album online under their own banner Paramvah Music, a subsidiary of Paramvah Studios and the digital partner Divo. The tracks received viral response from audiences.

== Release ==
Kirik Party was released theatrically on 30 December 2016 across Karnataka. The subsequent days saw releases in Karnataka's neighbouring States of Kerala, and Tamil Nadu. However, this movie did not release in Andhra Pradesh and Telangana. Over the following month, it was released and saw strong opening in United States, Singapore, Dubai, Japan, Israel and parts of Europe. The strong opening at the domestic box-office was significant in that the film faced stiff competition from the hitherto already successful run of Hindi film Dangal. The film's television premiere took place in Colors Kannada on 20 August 2017.

=== Marketing ===
The trailer of the film was released by Kannada actor Upendra at Renukamba Preview Theater in Malleshwaram on 27 October 2016. In YouTube it garnered more than 3 lakh views within 48 hours of its launch, breaking the previous record for a Kannada film trailers. As of February 2017 it has crossed 2 million views on YouTube. The official app of Kirik Party was released on 20 December 2016 for Android.

== Reception ==
The film opened to positive reviews from critics upon theatrical release. Writing for The Hindu, Archana Nathan called the film a "party down memory lane", further adding that "[t]here is an underlying theme of self-discovery that runs through the film" and also noting that "Ajaneesh Lokanath’s sound track plays a huge role in this narrative experience." Sunayana Suresh of The Times of India rated the film 4 out of 5, saying "Go ahead, watch this film and relive nostalgia from your college days." She further said that the film "scores high on technical values". Shashi Prasad of The Deccan Chronicle too rated 4/5 stars and wrote, "Both Rakshit and Rishab Shetty seem to have held onto the pulse of the new set of audience." He added, "If possible, take your college friends to watch this one for maximum fun and love." Noted critic Baradwaj Rangan writing on his blog said, "The must-haves of our cinema are all there. Romance. Comedy. Songs. Fights. But the director, Rishab Shetty, is stupendously inventive, and these generic elements acquire startlingly specific colours." He added "Forget La La Land. This is the most inventive musical of 2016."

Shyam Prasad of Bangalore Mirror rated 3.5/5 stars and wrote, "Director Rishab Shetty manages to derive lively and realistic performances from all actors. There is attention to detail but without forcing anything." A. Sharadhaa of The New Indian Express wrote that the film "portrays the happiness of youngsters’s life like never before in Kannada cinema" and added that it "touches the rainbow of experiences with sensibility, and does not waste much time, which is essentially the plus point of the film." She concluded by commending the performances of all the actors, alongside praising the film's music and camerawork. S. Viswanath of Deccan Herald called the film "a cacophonous campus tale spotlighting on the less appreciable aspects of students’ life." He wrote, "What is infuriating is that Rishab Shetty believes bunking classes, copying in exams, throwing tantrums at teachers and principal, whistling and wolfing at campus girls, invading hostels and downing pegs are meatier than the realistic depiction of what constitutes a student’s life" and added that "What actually ensures that one does not give up on Kirik Party is the brilliant acting of Rashmika Mandanna and Samyuktha Hegde."

== Box office ==
=== Domestic ===
The film collected ₹6 crore (US$620,000) on its opening weekend which is recorded as one of the biggest openings in Kannada cinema. It also opened strongly in Kerala and Tamil Nadu. The distributors revealed in January 2017 of having collected a share of close to ₹7 crore (US$730,000) and a gross of ₹10 crore (US$1.0 million) at the end of one week after release. The New Indian Express reported that the film had "apparently made a business of [₹]25 crore" after 25 days. By the end of 75 days, it collected ₹35 crore (US$3.6 million) and still was being screened in over 100 cinemas. The film went on to become the highest grossing Kannada film of 2016 grossing over ₹50 crores.

=== Overseas ===
The film released on in United Arab Emirates 6 January 2017 in over 20 screens and collected ₹38 lakh (US$39,000) in three days, over the weekend. The overall gross had reached ₹18 crore (US$1.9 million) by then. The film has performed strongly in the United States upon release on 1 February in over 60 screens after Jolly Hits acquired the distribution rights for overseas release. According to trade analyst, Taran Adarsh, the film collected US$233,507 at the US box office in the first weekend, breaking the lifetime collections of RangiTaranga in the country in over just one weekend.

== Accolades ==
Award (Note: Awards, festivals and organizations are in alphabetical order.)	Date of ceremony (Note: Date is linked to the article about the awards held that year, wherever possible.)	Category	Recipient(s)	Result	Ref.
Filmfare Awards South	17 June 2017	Best Director – Kannada	Rishab Shetty	Won	
Filmfare Awards South	17 June 2017	Best Actor – Kannada	Rakshit Shetty	Nominated	
Filmfare Awards South	17 June 2017	Critics Best Actor – Kannada	Rakshit Shetty	Won	
Filmfare Awards South	17 June 2017	Best Supporting Actress – Kannada	Samyuktha Hegde	Won	
Filmfare Awards South	17 June 2017	Best Music Director – Kannada	B. Ajaneesh Loknath	Won	
Filmfare Awards South	17 June 2017	Best Lyricist – Kannada	Rakshit Shetty (for song "Katheyondu Helide")	Nominated	
Filmfare Awards South	17 June 2017	Best Male Playback Singer – Kannada	Vijay Prakash (for song "Belageddu")	Won	
Filmfare Awards South	17 June 2017	Best Female Playback Singer – Kannada	Shreya Ghoshal (for song "Neenire Saniha")	Nominated	
IIFA Utsavam	28–29 March 2017	Best Film	G. S. Guptha, Rakshit Shetty	Won	
IIFA Utsavam	28–29 March 2017	Best Director – Kannada	Rishab Shetty	Nominated	
IIFA Utsavam	28–29 March 2017	Best Story – Kannada	Rakshit Shetty	Nominated	
IIFA Utsavam	28–29 March 2017	Best Actor – Kannada	Rakshit Shetty	Won	
IIFA Utsavam	28–29 March 2017	Best Actress – Kannada	Rashmika Mandanna	Nominated	
IIFA Utsavam	28–29 March 2017	Best Supporting Actor – Kannada	Chandan Achar	Nominated	
IIFA Utsavam	28–29 March 2017	Best Supporting Actress – Kannada	Aishwarya Acchappa	Nominated	
IIFA Utsavam	28–29 March 2017	Best Actor in a Comic Role – Kannada	Pramod Shetty	Nominated	
IIFA Utsavam	28–29 March 2017	Best Actor in a Negative Role – Kannada	Aravinnd Iyer	Nominated	
IIFA Utsavam	28–29 March 2017	Best Music Direction – Kannada	B. Ajaneesh Loknath	Won	
IIFA Utsavam	28–29 March 2017	Best Lyricist – Kannada	Rakshit Shetty (for song "Katheyondu Helide")	Won	
IIFA Utsavam	28–29 March 2017	Best Male Playback Singer – Kannada	Vijay Prakash (for song "Belageddu")	Won	
IIFA Utsavam	28–29 March 2017	Best Female Playback Singer – Kannada	Inchara Rao (for song "Ayomaya")	Nominated	
Karnataka State Film Awards	24 April 2017	Best Family Entertainer	Rakshit Shetty, G. S. Guptha, Rishab Shetty	Won	
South Indian International Movie Awards	1 July 2017	Best Film – Kannada	Paramvah Studios	Won	
South Indian International Movie Awards	1 July 2017	Best Director – Kannada	Rishab Shetty	Won	
South Indian International Movie Awards	1 July 2017	Best Actor – Kannada	Rakshit Shetty	Nominated	
South Indian International Movie Awards	1 July 2017	Entertainer of the Year	Rakshit Shetty	Won	
South Indian International Movie Awards	1 July 2017	Best Supporting Actor – Kannada	Chandan Achar	Won	
South Indian International Movie Awards	1 July 2017	Best Comedian – Kannada	Pramod Shetty	Nominated	
South Indian International Movie Awards	1 July 2017	Best Actor in a Negative Role – Kannada	Aravinnd Iyer	Nominated	
South Indian International Movie Awards	1 July 2017	Best Female Debut – Kannada	Rashmika Mandanna	Won	
South Indian International Movie Awards	1 July 2017	Best Female Debut – Kannada	Samyuktha Hegde	Nominated	
South Indian International Movie Awards	1 July 2017	Best Music Director – Kannada	B. Ajaneesh Loknath	Won	
South Indian International Movie Awards	1 July 2017	Best Lyricist – Kannada	Dhananjay Rajan	Won	
South Indian International Movie Awards	1 July 2017	Best Male Playback Singer – Kannada	Vijay Prakash	Nominated	
South Indian International Movie Awards	1 July 2017	Best Female Playback Singer – Kannada	Shreya Ghoshal	Nominated	
