= Mehreen =

- Pronunciation: 'Meh-reen'
- Gender: Female
- Language: Persian

Origin
- Meaning: "sun-like" or "loveable"

Mehreen ( Persian: مهرین), also transliterated as Mehreen, is a feminine Persian name, meaning "sun-like" or "lovable". "Mehr" means "sun" or "affection/love" in Persian language. It is a popular name in Iran (Persia) and other Persian-speaking countries such as Afghanistan and Tajikistan. The Persian name is also popular among Arab countries.

Notable people with the name include:

- Mehreen Mahmud, Bangladeshi singer
- Mehreen Faruqi, Australian politician
- Mehreen Anwar Raja, Pakistani politician
- Mehreen Jabbar, Pakistani film maker
- Mehreen Javid, Indian model

== See also ==
- for articles on persons with this first name
