= 6th South Indian International Movie Awards =

Indian annual film awards event

- Date: 30 June - 1 July 2017
- Hosted by: Allu Sirish, Lakshmi Manchu
- Produced by: Vibri Media Group
- Organized by: Vibri Media Group
- Official website: Abu Dhabi National Exhibition Centre, Abu Dhabi, United Arab Emirates

Television coverage
- Channel: Gemini TV; Sun TV; Surya TV; Udaya TV
- Network: Sun TV Network

The 6th South Indian International Movie Awards is an awards event held at the Abu Dhabi National Exhibition Centre, Abu Dhabi on 30 June and 1 July 2017. SIIMA 2017 will recognize the best films and performances from the past year, along with special honors for lifetime contributions and a few special awards. The nomination list for the main awards was announced in June 2017.

== Honorary awards ==
=== Lifetime Achievement Award ===
- Murali Mohan
- S. P. Balasubrahmanyam

=== Special appreciation ===
- Mohan Babu for completing 40 years in Telugu Film industry.

== Main awards winners and nominees ==
=== Film ===
Best Film
Tamil	Telugu
Irudhi Suttru – YNOT Studios; Joker – Dream Warrior Pictures; Pichaikkaran – Vijay Antony Film Corporation; Theri – V Creations; Visaranai – Wunderbar Films, Grass Root Film Company	Pelli Choopulu – BigBen Cinemas, Dharmapath Creations; A Aa – Haarika & Hasinee Creations; Janatha Garage – Mythri Movie Makers; Kshanam – PVP Cinema; Sarrainodu – Geetha Arts
Kannada	Malayalam
Kotigobba 2 – Rambabu Productions; Godhi Banna Sadharana Mykattu – Pushkar Films; Kirik Party – Paramvah Studios; Thithi – Pratap Reddy, Sunmin Park; U Turn – Pawan Kumar Studios	Kammatipaadam – Global United Media; Action Hero Biju – Pauly Jr. Pictures & Full On Studios; Maheshinte Prathikaaram – OPM Dream Mill Cinemas; Oppam – Aashirvad Cinemas; Pulimurugan – Mulakuppadam Films
Best Director
Tamil	Telugu
Atlee - Theri; Manikandan – Aandavan Kattalai; Raju Murugan – Joker; Sudha Kongara – Irudhi Suttru; Vetrimaaran – Visaranai	Vamsi Paidipally – Oopiri; Boyapati Srinu – Sarrainodu; Koratala Siva – Janatha Garage; Sukumar – Nannaku Prematho; Trivikram Srinivas – A Aa
Kannada	Malayalam
Rishab Shetty– Kirik Party; Pawan Kumar – U Turn; Pawan Wadeyar – Jessie; Sumana Kittur – Kiragoorina Gayyaligalu; Vijaya Prasad – Neer Dose	Vysakh – Pulimurugan; Abrid Shine – Action Hero Biju; Priyadarshan – Oppam; Rajeev Ravi – Kammatipaadam; Vineeth Sreenivasan – Jacobinte Swargarajyam

=== Acting ===
Best Actor
Tamil	Telugu
Sivakarthikeyan – Remo; Karthi – Thozha; Suriya – 24; Vijay – Theri; Vikram – Iru Mugan	NTR Jr. – Janatha Garage; Allu Arjun – Sarrainodu; Mahesh Babu – Brahmotsavam; Nani – Krishna Gadi Veera Prema Gaadha; Ram Charan – Dhruva
Kannada	Malayalam
Shiva Rajkumar – Shivalinga; Jaggesh - Neer Dose; Puneeth Rajkumar – Doddmane Hudga; Rakshit Shetty – Kirik Party; Yash – Santhu Straight Forward	Mohanlal – Pulimurugan; Biju Menon - Anuraga Karikkin Vellam; Nivin Pauly – Jacobinte Swargarajyam; Fahadh Faasil – Maheshinte Prathikaaram; Nivin Pauly – Action Hero Biju
Best Actress
Tamil	Telugu
Nayantara – Iru Mugan; Amala Paul - Amma Kanakku; Samantha Ruth Prabhu – Theri; Tamannaah Bhatia – Dharma Durai; Varalaxmi Sarathkumar – Tharai Thappattai	Rakul Preet Singh – Nannaku Prematho; Lavanya Tripathi - Srirastu Subhamastu; Regina Cassandra – Jo Achyutananda; Ritu Varma – Pelli Choopulu; Samantha Ruth Prabhu – A Aa
Kannada	Malayalam
Shraddha Srinath – U Turn; Hariprriya - Neer Dose; Parul Yadav – Killing Veerappan; Shruti Hariharan – Godhi Banna Sadharana Mykattu; Vedhicka – Shivalinga	Nayantara – Puthiya Niyamam; Asha Sarath – Anuraga Karikkin Vellam; Manju Warrier – Vettah; Sai Pallavi – Kali; Vedhicka – James & Alice
Best Actor in a Supporting Role
Tamil	Telugu
Prakash Raj – Manithan; Mu. Ramaswamy - Joker; Parthiban – Maaveeran Kittu; Samuthirakani – Visaranai; Akkineni Nagarjuna– Thozha	Srikanth – Sarrainodu; Mohanlal - Janatha Garage; Nara Rohit – Appatlo Okadundevadu; Rajendra Prasad – Supreme; Satyam Rajesh – Kshanam
Kannada	Malayalam
Chandan Achar - Kirik Party; Dileep Raj – U Turn; H. G. Dattatreya – Neer Dose; Sanchari Vijay – Killing Veerappan; Thilak Shekar – Karvva	Renji Panicker - Jacobinte Swargarajyam; Alancier - Maheshinte Prathikaaram; Suraj Venjaramoodu – Action Hero Biju; Tovino Thomas – Guppy; Vinayakan – Kammatipaadam
Best Actress in a Supporting Role
Tamil	Telugu
Aishwarya Rajesh - Dharma Durai; Pooja Devariya - Iraivi; Radhika – Theri; Subbalakshmi – Ammani; Suja Varunee – Kidaari	Anasuya - Kshanam; Anupama Parameswaran – Premam; Jayasudha – Oopiri; Nadiya Moidu - A Aa; Ramya Krishnan – Soggade Chinni Nayana
Kannada	Malayalam
Radhika Chetan - U Turn; Kavya Shah - Mukunda Murari; Karunya Ram - Kiragoorina Gayyaligalu; Suman Ranganathan – Neer Dose; Yagna Shetty - Killing Veerappan	Lakshmi Ramakrishnan – Jacobinte Swargarajyam; Anusree - Maheshinte Prathikaaram; Punnasseri Kanchana – Olappeeppi; Ramya Krishnan - Aadupuliyattam; Rohini – Action Hero Biju
Best Actor in a Negative Role
Tamil	Telugu
Trisha – Kodi; Baba Sehgal - Achcham Yenbadhu Madamaiyada; Mahendran – Theri; R. K. Suresh – Tharai Thappattai; Vela Ramamoorthy – Kidaari	Jagapathi Babu – Nannaku Prematho; Aadhi - Sarrainodu; Arvind Swamy - Dhruva; Kabir Duhan Singh – Supreme; Sharad Kelkar – Sardaar Gabbar Singh
Kannada	Malayalam
Vasishta N. Simha – Godhi Banna Sadharana Mykattu; Aravinnd Iyer – Kirik Party; Arun Vijay – Chakravyuha; P. Ravishankar – Mukunda Murari; Sandeep Bharadwaj – Killing Veerappan	Chemban Vinod Jose - Kali; Jagapathi Babu – Pulimurugan; Jagadeesh – Leela; Samuthirakani – Oppam; Sujith Shankar – Maheshinte Prathikaaram
Best Comedian
Tamil	Telugu
Yogi Babu – Aandavan Kattalai; Mottai Rajendran - Dhilluku Dhuddu; Robo Shankar – Velainu Vandhutta Vellaikaaran; Sathish – Remo; Soori – Rajini Murugan	Priyadarshi – Pelli Choopulu; Brahmanandam - Sarrainodu; Krishna Bhagavan – Jayammu Nischayammu Raa; Prudhviraj – Supreme; Vennela Kishore – Majnu
Kannada	Malayalam
Ravishankar Gowda – Sundaranga Jaana; Bullet Prakash - Run Antony; Chikkanna – Kotigobba 2; Pramod Shetty - Kirik Party; Sadhu Kokila – Mungaru Male 2	Joju George – Action Hero Biju; Dharmajan - Kattappanayile Rithwik Roshan; Rony David– Aanandam; Sharafuddeen - Happy Wedding; Soubin Shahir– Maheshinte Prathikaaram

=== Debut awards ===
Best Debut Actor
Tamil	Telugu
Kalidas Jayaram – Meen Kuzhambum Mann Paanaiyum; Balakrishna Kola – Maalai Nerathu Mayakkam; Shirish Saravanan – Metro; Vijay Kumar – Uriyadi; Walter Phillips – Meendum Oru Kadhal Kadhai	Roshan Meka – Nirmala Convent; Nikhil Kumar – Jaguar; Sandeep Kumar – Vangaveeti; Sagar – Siddhartha
Kannada	Malayalam
Nikhil Gowda – Jaguar; Anoop Revanna – Lakshmana; Dilip Prakash – Crazy Boy; Roger Narayan – U Turn; Sachin – Happy Birthday	Shane Nigam– Kismath; Gokul Suresh – Mudhugauv; Arun Kurian - Aanandam; Manikantan – Kammatipaadam; Vishnu Unnikrishnan – Kattappanayile Rithwik Roshan
Best Debut Actress
Tamil	Telugu
Ritika Singh – Irudhi Suttru; Madonna Sebastian - Kadhalum Kadandhu Pogum; Manjima Mohan – Achcham Yenbadhu Madamaiyada; Nikhila Vimal – Kidaari; Wamiqa Gabbi – Maalai Nerathu Mayakkam	Niveda Thomas – Gentleman; Keerthy Suresh – Nenu Sailaja; Mehreen – Krishna Gadi Veera Prema Gaadha; Niharika Konidela – Oka Manasu; Anu Emmanuel - Majnu
Kannada	Malayalam
Rashmika Mandanna – Kirik Party; Ashika Rangnath - Crazy Boy; Krishi Thapanda – Akira; Pooja S M – Thithi; Samyuktha Hegde – Kirik Party	Rajisha Vijayan – Anuraga Karikkin Vellam; Aparna Balamurali - Maheshinte Prathikaaram; Huma Qureshi – White; Prayaga Martin – Oru Murai Vanthu Parthaya; Varalaxmi Sarathkumar – Kasaba
Best Debut Director
Tamil	Telugu
Karthick Naren - Dhuruvangal Pathinaaru; Vijay Kumar – Uriyadi; Bakkiyaraj Kannan - Remo; Pradeep Krishnamurthy - Saithan; Prasath Murugesan – Kidaari	Tharun Bhascker Dhaassyam– Pelli Choopulu; G. Naga Koteswara Rao - Nirmala Convent; K. V. Dayanand Reddy - Siddhartha; Kalyan Krishna Kurasala – Soggade Chinni Nayana; Ravikanth Perepu – Kshanam
Kannada	Malayalam
Hemanth Rao - Godhi Banna Sadharana Mykattu; D. Sathyaprakash - Rama Rama Re...; Navaneeth - Karvva; Raam Reddy - Thithi; Raghavendra Hegde – Jaggu Dada	Johnpaul George – Guppy; Ganesh Raj - Aanandam; Dileesh Pothan - Maheshinte Prathikaaram; Khalid Rahman – Anuraga Karikkin Vellam; Shanavas K. Bavakutty – Kismath

=== Music ===
Best Music Director
Tamil	Telugu
A. R. Rahman – Achcham Yenbadhu Madamaiyada; Anirudh Ravichander – Remo; Harris Jayaraj – Iru Mugan; Nivas K. Prasanna – Sethupathi; Santhosh Narayanan – Kabali	Devi Sri Prasad – Janatha Garage; Kalyan Koduri – Jyo Achyutananda; Mickey J Meyer – A Aa; S. Thaman – Sarrainodu; Vivek Sagar – Pellichoopulu
Kannada	Malayalam
Ajaneesh Loknath – Kirik Party; Anoop Seelin – Jessie; Arjun Janya – Mukunda Murari; Charan Raj – Godhi Banna Sadharana Mykattu; V. Harikrishna – Doddmane Hudga	Bijibal – Maheshinte Prathikaaram; Gopi Sundar – Pulimurugan; Shaan Rahman – Jacobinte Swargarajyam; Sooraj S. Kurup - Valleem Thetti Pulleem Thetti; Vishnu Vijay - Guppy
Best Lyricist
Tamil	Telugu
Madhan Karky - "Munnal Kadhali" from Miruthan; Arunraja Kamaraj – "Neruppu Da" from Kabali; Thamarai – "Thalli Pogathey" from Achcham Yenbadhu Madamaiyada; Vairamuthu – "Endha Pakkam" from Dharma Durai; Vivek - "Vazhkai Oru Ottagam" from Aandavan Kattalai	Ramajogayya Sastry – "Pranaamam" from Janatha Garage; Bhaskarabhatla Ravi Kumar – "Oka Laalana" from Jyo Achyutananda; Chandrabose – "Chusa Chusa" from Dhruva; Sirasri – "Maranam Adi Tadhyam" from Vangaveeti; Sri Mani – "Thelusa Thelusa" from Sarrainodu
Kannada	Malayalam
Dhananjay Rajan – "Belageddu Yara Mukhava" from Kirik Party; Jayanth Kaikini – "Helilla Yarallu Naanu" from Krishna-Rukku; Sudarshan D. C. – "Ale Moodadhe" from Godhi Banna Sadharana Mykattu; V. Nagendra Prasad – "Mukunda Murari" from Mukunda Murari; Yogaraj Bhat – "Thraas Akkathi" from Doddmane Hudga	Santhosh Varma – "Pokka" from Action Hero Biju; Anwar Ali - "Puzhu Pullikal" from Kammatipaadam; Hari Narayanan – "Minungum" from Oppam; Manu Manjith – "Thiruvavani Ravu" from Jacobinte Swargarajyam; Rafeeq Ahammed – "Idukki" from Maheshinte Prathikaaram
Best Male Playback Singer
Tamil	Telugu
Anirudh Ravichander – "Senjitaley" from Remo; D. Imman – "Ennamma Ippadi Pannrengale Maa" from Rajini Murugan; Sid Sriram – "Thalli Pogathey" from Achcham Yenbadhu Madamaiyada; Sundarayyar – "Jasmine U" from Joker; Vijay Yesudas – "Avalum Naanum" from Achcham Yenbadhu Madamaiyada	Sagar – "Sailaja Sailaja" from Nenu Sailaja; Devi Sri Prasad - "Nannaku Prematho" from Nannaku Prematho; Shankar Mahadevan – "Pranaamam" from Janatha Garage; Sid Sriram – "Vellipomakey" from Sahasam Swasaga Sagipo; Vijay Yesudas – "Evare" from Premam
Kannada	Malayalam
Armaan Malik – "Sariyaagi Nenapide" from Mungaru Male 2; Anoop Seelin – "Malgudiya Ooralli" from Jessie; NTR Jr. – "Geleya Geleya" from Chakravyuha; Tippu – "Oh Baby" from Ricky; Vijay Prakash – "Belageddu Yaara Mukhava" from Kirik Party	Sooraj Santhosh – "Thaniye" from Guppy; Job Kurian - "Chilluranthal" from Kali; M. G. Sreekumar – "Chinnamma" from Oppam; P. Jayachandran – "Podimeesa" from Pa Va; Vijay Yesudas – "Mounangal" from Maheshinte Prathikaaram
Best Female Playback Singer
Tamil	Telugu
K. S. Chithra - "Konji Pesida Venam" from Sethupathi; Dhee – "Ey Sandakkara" from Irudhi Suttru; Lalitha Sudha – "Chellamma" from Joker; Shashaa Tirupati – "Raasali" from Achcham Yenbadhu Madamaiyada; Shreya Ghoshal – "Mirutha Mirutha" from Miruthan	Ramya Behara – "Rang De" from A Aa; Geetha Madhuri - "Pakka Local" from Janatha Garage; Padmalatha – "Chusa Chusa" from Dhruva; Sameera Bharadwaj – "Telusa Telusa" from Sarrainodu; Uma Neha – "Tikku Tikkantu" from Babu Bangaram
Kannada	Malayalam
Indu Nagaraj – "Thraas Akkathi" from Doddmane Hudga; Ananya Bhagath – "Sapura Kati" from Neer Dose; Inchara Rao – "Ayomaaya" from Godhi Banna Sadharana Mykattu; Ramya NSK – "Betegara" from Shivalinga; Shreya Ghoshal – "Neenire Saniha" from Kirik Party	K. S. Chithra - "Kaadaniyum" from Pulimurugan; Shreya Ghoshal – "Ritushalabhame" from 10 Kalpanakal; Sreya Jayadeep– "Minungum" from Oppam; Shweta Mohan – "Oru Vela" from White; Vani Jayaram – "Pookkal" from Action Hero Biju

== Critics' choice ==
Tamil Cinema

- Best Actor – R. Madhavan – Irudhi Suttru
- Best Actress – Varalaxmi Sarathkumar – Tharai Thappattai

Telugu Cinema

- Best Actor – Nani – Krishna Gaadi Veera Prema Gaadha

Kannada Cinema

- Best Actor – Rakshith Shetty – Kirik Party
- Best Actress – Parul Yadav – Killing Veerappan

Malayalam Cinema

- Best Actor – Nivin Pauly
- Best Actress – Asha Sarath

== Generation Best Awards ==
- Entertainer of the Year :
  - Vijay for Theri
  - Rakshit Shetty for Kirik Party
- Generation Next Superstar – Baby Nainika for Theri
