= Kantara: Chapter 1 =

2025 Indian film by Rishab Shetty

- Theatrical release poster
- Directed by: Rishab Shetty
- Written by: Rishab Shetty; Anirudh Mahesh; Shanil Goutham
- Produced by: Vijay Kiragandur; Chaluve Gowda
- Starring: Rishab Shetty; Jayaram; Rukmini Vasanth; Gulshan Devaiah
- Cinematography: Arvind S Kashyap
- Edited by: Suresh Mallaiah
- Music by: B. Ajaneesh Loknath
- Production company: Hombale Films
- Distributed by: see below
- Release date: 2 October 2025
- Running time: 169 minutes
- Country: India
- Language: Kannada
- Box office: ₹850–852 crore (Note: Kantara: Chapter 1's reported worldwide grosses vary between ₹850 crore (Deccan Chronicle, Cinema Express, The New Indian Express, and DNA India) – ₹852 crore (Deccan Herald and News18))

Kantara: A Legend – Chapter 1 (transl. Mysterious Forest: Chapter 1) is a 2025 Indian Kannada-language epic period mythological action drama film co-written and directed by Rishab Shetty, and produced by Vijay Kiragandur and Chaluve Gowda under Hombale Films. The film stars Rishab Shetty in a quadruple role as Berme, Mayakara, Annappa and Kaadubettu Shiva, along with Jayaram, Rukmini Vasanth, and Gulshan Devaiah. A prequel to the 2022 film Kantara, the story delves deeper into the origins of the tradition and ancestral conflict introduced in the first film.

Set in pre-colonial coastal Karnataka, the prequel blends regional folklore and divinity into a narrative that explores man's relationship with nature. Filming began in November 2023. B. Ajaneesh Loknath composed the soundtrack and background score. The film was released on 2 October 2025, coinciding with Dasara.

Like the predecessor, Chapter 1 received positive reviews from critics. It became a commercial success at the box office and is currently the second highest-grossing Kannada film of all-time, second highest grossing Indian film of 2025 and also ranks among highest-grossing Indian films of all time.

== Plot ==
Set during the reign of the Kadamba dynasty in ancient coastal Karnataka, the story explores the mythical origins of the sacred traditions and divine guardians introduced in the original Kantara. Deep within the mysterious forests of Kantara lies a protected spiritual realm guarded by powerful Daivas — Panjurli and Guliga — who maintain the balance between nature and mankind.

The kingdom of Bangra, ruled by the ruthless king Vijayendra, seeks to gain more areas to add into his kingdom. While taking a bath, a mysterious person named Mayakara spies on him and is caught. While he is dragged, fresh spices from the Kantara forest fall from his pocket. Seeing this, Vijayendra decides to exploit the forest's sacred spice lands and enslaves villagers to expand his empire. However, when Vijayendra enters the forbidden forest, he is trapped by Mayakara and encounters supernatural forces (Daivas) that destroy him, leaving his traumatized son Rajashekara to inherit the throne and swear never to disturb the sacred land again.

Years later, a mysterious child named Berme is discovered inside a sacred well and raised by a tribal girl, Baidi, who is connected to the mystical powers in Kantara. As he grows, Berme becomes a fearless warrior deeply connected to the forest and its spiritual powers. Meanwhile, the ambitious prince Kulashekara and Princess Kanakavathi, children of Rajashekhara, are forbidden to enter the forest by Rajashekhara as he believed a Bramha-Rakshasa lives there. Kulashekhara is crowned king at a suitable age, and he appoints Bhogendra, his friend as his minister and they just exploit the kingdom's resources. They go for a hunt in Kantara with multiple soldiers, but all of them are ambushed by Berme and his friends, while the king and his friends run away. One soldier, Chenna, is still alive and agrees to take Berme's group to Bangra in exchange of him being spared alive. Berme and his friends enter as guards, and there he meets Kanakavathi. Later, the gang gets noticed stealing spices, causing them to create havoc and destroy multiple shops and houses. They are later caught by the soldiers and taken to Kulashekhara, who has them whipped. They are later jailed, but a soldier, Booba, accidentally gets them out after he gets high on forest herbs given by Berme. They escape, take a citizen Sankappa, who was the architect of Bangra's weapons and kingdom walls. They go to Kantara and start agricultural practices, and trade the products in Bangra's port. Meanwhile, Berme forms a connection with Kanakavathi, who teaches him the basics of trading, displeasing Kulashekhara. One day, Berme and his friends decide to go deep into the forest for more resources, but they are suddenly attacked by the Kadappa tribe, skilled in black magic and incorporate the Slender Loris into their dark rituals and practices. They overpower Berme's gang, but as they are about to kill Berme and his friends, a tiger (Huli) appears and kills the leader of the tribe, causing the animals to flee and allowing the gang to escape. It is revealed that the Kadapa tribe arrived in Kantara, seeking refuge. They appeared to be innocent at first, but later started to exploit the powers of Daivas, causing Huli Daiva to appear and drive them out. Later, Kulashekhara sends Bhogendra to remove Berme from the port, he is brutally beaten up by Berme, who takes control of Bangra Port. When Rajashekhara mocks Kulashekhara for this, he is angered and intoxicates Rajashekhara and decides to take an attempt to reclaim control over the sacred lands and exploit their divine energy for political power.

Kulashekhara then attacks Kantara in the night while Berme and his friends are out. He kills multiple people, including Baidi right as Berme arrives. Suddenly, Berme is possessed by Guliga Daiva, who then single-handedly finishes rest of the army and kills Kulashekhara. Both parties suffer equal losses. Kanakavathi arrives and asks for a truce and permission to install the idols of Daivas in the palace's temple. The villagers agree after seeking the permission of the Daivas. But soon, animals start to mysteriously die, and that is when Berme realises that Kanakavathi is the real enemy. The kingdom was involved with the Kadapa tribe and installed the idols at their temple so that the people of Kadapa could feast on the Daivas' powers and become stronger.

Learning this, Berme wages a war against Bangra with the help of his tribal family. While they fight against the army, Kanakavathi makes a mystic sealing, preventing the Daivas to intervene, and then she performs a ritual on Rajashekhara with the help of the leader of Kadapa which would make him strong and capable enough to kill Berme. After sunset, Rajashekhara gets possessed and they come onto the battlefield and start killing people. Mayakara suddenly appears and tells Berme to go to the well from where he was found. Upon reaching there, Berme encounters a Shivalingam, and also the Bramha-Rakshasa. While fighting the Rakshasa, Berme touches the trident, leading him to be possessed by Guliga Daiva again. Berme along with Huli Daiva reach the battlefield. Since Guliga Daiva refused to harm a lady, his sister, Chavundi Daiva, possesses Berme and kills both Rajashekhara and Kanakavathi.

The story ends with Berme vanishing into the sacred well, cementing his place as part of the eternal legend of Kantara and setting the stage for the next chapter in the saga.

== Cast ==
- Rishab Shetty in a triple roles as
  - Berme
  - Mayakaara
  - Annappa (archive footage)
- Jayaram as King Rajashekara, father of Kulashekara and Kanakavathi
- Rukmini Vasanth as Princess Kanakavathi, Kulashekara's sister and Rajashekara's daughter
- Gulshan Devaiah as King Kulashekara, Kanakavathi's brother and Rajashekara's son
- Ramitha Shailendra as Rajamatha Rajalakshmi, Rajashekara's wife; Kulashekara and Kanakavathi's mother
- Pramod Shetty as Bhogendra, Kulashekara's minister
- Naveen D. Padil as Booba, Port official
- Rakesh Poojari as Peppe, Booba's son
- Prakash Thuminad in a dual role as :
  - Chenna, soldier
  - Raampa (cameo)
- Deepak Rai Panaje as Sankappa
- Hariprashanth M G as King Vijayendra, Rajashekhara's father
- Mime Ramdas as Ramadasa, a musician
- Bala Rajwadi as Jabbanna
- Sampath Ram
- Raghavendra S
- Ranjan Shetty
- Mithun Raj
- Prathima Nayak
- Gagan Murthy
- Goutham Raj
- Ayra Krishna as Kulashekara's wife
- Naveen Bondel

Cameo appearances

- Achyuth Kumar as Dalal, an arab trader
- Pragathi Rishab Shetty as a woman in Bangra
- Ranvit Rishab Shetty as a child in Bangra
- Raadya Rishab Shetty as young Kanakavathi

== Production ==
=== Development ===
Following the success of Kantara (2022), in February 2023, Rishab Shetty confirmed that a prequel would be made. It was reported that in Mangalore, Shetty had sought the permission of god Panjurli to film a prequel. The scripting work was completed in around 8 months, where Shetty collaborated with Shaneel Gautham and Anirudh Mahesh.

The film throws light on the origin of Panjurli Daiva and Guliga Daiva. The film's story is set in pre-colonial Karnataka, during the reign of Kadambas from Banavasi. Later, Shetty also revealed that basic theme of the film is same as previous part, and focuses on the conflict between the tribals of Kantara forest and a tyrannical king.

=== Filming ===
Principal photography began in November 2023, with a formal pooja ceremony. In April 2024, major portion was filmed in Shetty's own village Keradi in Kundapura. A massive set was created by more than 600 carpenters for the same. Shetty learned horse riding, Kalaripayattu and sword fighting for his role. In November 2024, a bus carrying crew members met with an accident near Jadkal due to which shooting got halted. In January 2025, filming moved to the forests of Sakleshpur. However, later the makers were fined ₹50K for dumping material inside protected forest area. In February 2025, a grand war sequence was filmed which was choreographed by national and international experts. The sequence included over 500 skilled fighters and a total cast of nearly 3,000 people. It was shot on a 25-acre set in Karnataka's mountains, and the sequence took nearly 50 days to film completely. In May 2025, the film's last schedule was filmed 20 kilometers away from Kundapur. In the same month, reports claimed that actor Rakesh Poojary died on film's set but later makers clarified about his death on a family function and not on film set. Shetty filmed the climax with swollen and bruised legs. The entire filming was wrapped by July 2025.

== Music ==
The film's soundtrack album and background score was composed by B. Ajaneesh Loknath, who had composed for the prequel, Kantara.

The first single titled "Brahmakalasha" was released on 28 September 2025. The second single titled "Rebel Song" was released on 1 October 2025. The song's Hindi version was sung by Diljit Dosanjh. The full album was released on 11 October 2025.

== Marketing ==
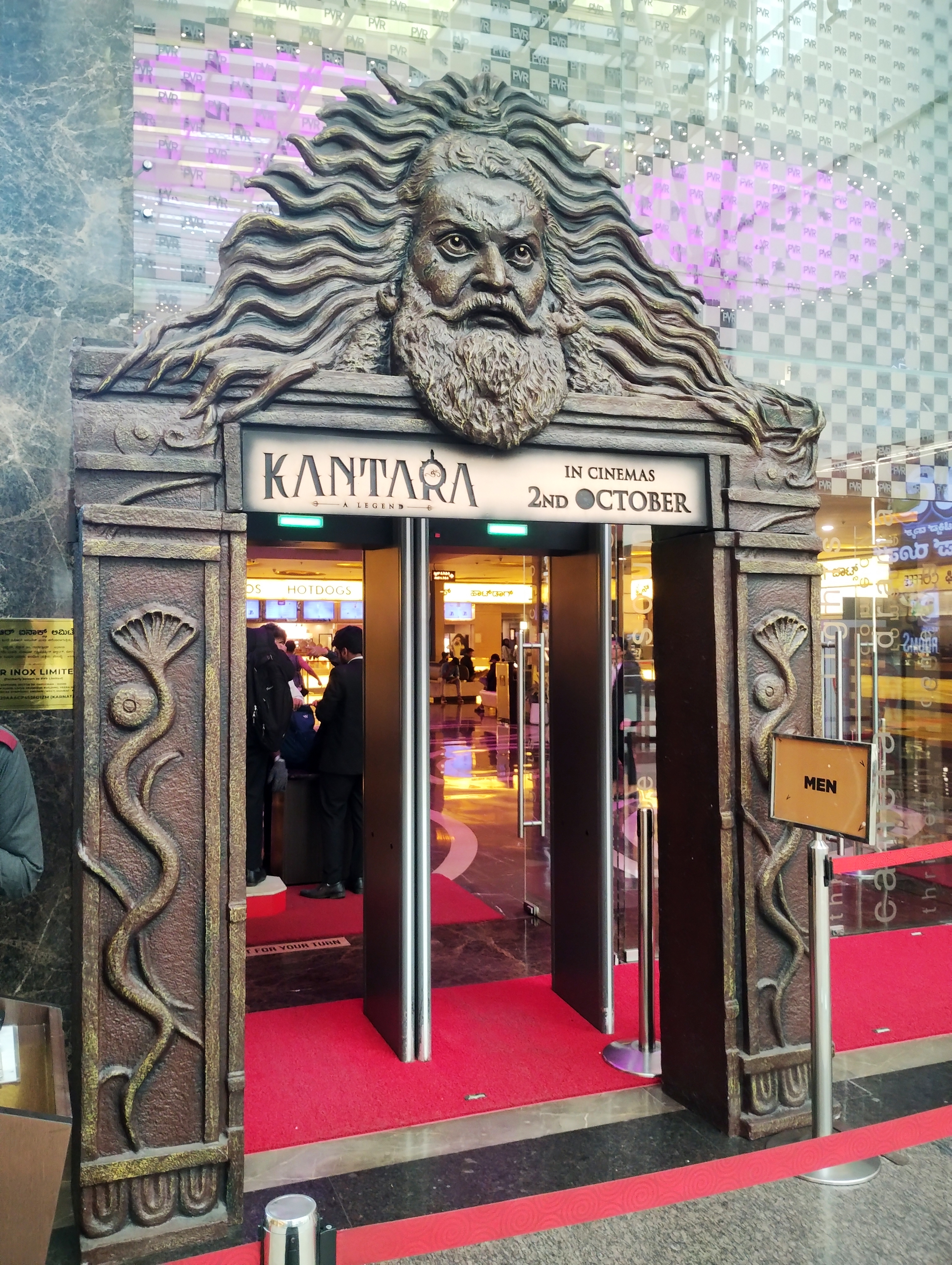
Premiering of the film in Orion Mall, Bangalore

Following the release of the trailer a press meet was held in Bengaluru. On 28 September 2025, a pre-release event was held in Hyderabad where N. T. Rama Rao Jr. was invited as chief guest. On 30 September 2025, another pre-release event was set to take place in Chennai, however it was cancelled by the makers, following the 2025 Karur crowd crush. On 7 October 2025, a success meet was held in New Delhi.

== Release ==
=== Theatrical ===
Kantara: Chapter 1 was released in theatres worldwide on 2 October 2025 in standard and IMAX, D-Box, ICE, 4DX, Dolby Cinema and EPIQ formats, coinciding with Gandhi Jayanti and Vijayadashami. Apart from the original Kannada language it was also released in dubbed versions of Hindi, Tamil, Telugu, and Malayalam. The English and Spanish version was released with a shortened runtime on 31 October 2025.

=== Distribution ===
The producers Hombale Films will distribute the film in Karnataka. In Kerala, actor-filmmaker Prithviraj Sukumaran’s company Prithviraj Productions acquired the theatrical rights, continuing their collaboration from Kantara (2022). In North India, AA Films handled the distribution, while in the Telugu-speaking states, Mythri Movie Makers, Geetha Arts, Vaaraahi Chalana Chitram, Vigneshwara Entertainments, SV Cinemas and KSN Telefilms handled the distribution. In Tamil Nadu, the distribution was handled by Think Studios, M. Movies, Fivestar K. Senthil and S Picture. For overseas markets, distribution was managed by Phars Films. In North America, distribution was handled by Prathyangira Cinemas. In Malaysia, the film was distribute by DMY Creation and screened in 88 Cinema nationwide in Tamil dub.

=== Home media ===
The digital distribution rights of the film were acquired by Amazon Prime Video for ₹125 crore. The film began streaming on Amazon Prime Video from 31 October 2025 in Kannada and dubbed versions of Tamil, Telugu and Malayalam languages. The Hindi dubbed version began streaming on the same platform from 27 November 2025.

== Sequel ==
The film's ending revealed that the well Berme jumped into and disappeared in the same place where Annappa and Kaadubettu Shiva disappeared which confirms the next film Kantara: Chapter 2. It will serve as the prequel to Kantara and as the sequel to Kantara: Chapter 1 and will explore more secrets of both the well, forest and new deities (daivas).

== Reception ==
=== Box-office ===
The film sold 12.80 lakh tickets online on the first day. Though the early estimate suggested the film to have collected ₹75 crore before night shows of the first day, at the end of day one, the gross collection was reported to be around ₹85–90 crore, with ₹72 crore within India and ₹20 crore in Hindi version alone. With ₹89+ crore in worldwide earnings on Day 1, it was reported to have outperformed every other release of the year. The film crossed ₹100 crore mark in 2 days making it one of the quickest films of 2025 to reach that milestone. The worldwide gross at the end of two days was reported to be ₹151 crore. Even before the end of third day, the early estimate suggested the film netted ₹162.85 crores. The worldwide theatrical gross at the end of first Saturday was reported to be ₹225 crore. The film grossed ₹325–335 crore in its extended 4-day first weekend thereby implying ₹100 crore gross theatrical collection worldwide on its first Sunday. Domestically, within 4 days, the film netted ₹75 crore in the Hindi version, ₹47 crore in the Telugu version and ₹22 crore in the Tamil version.

The film surpassed ₹350 crore mark on its first Monday. The film grossed over ₹400 crores in 6 days. By the end of seven days, the worldwide gross stood at ₹450 crore. The film became the highest-grossing film in the world in the first week of its release with a gross worldwide collection of $53 million. The film crossed the ₹500 crore mark in its 8-day extended first week and grossed ₹520 crores before the beginning of its second week. On the online ticketing platform BookMyShow, the film sold the third-highest number of tickets in its first week. The film sold approximately 8.20 million tickets in its eight-day opening week on the platform, surpassing the ticket sales of Jawan (7.65 million) and Jailer (6.60 million). It crossed the ₹600 crore mark before the beginning of its second weekend. The film was reported to have grossed over ₹650 crores in 11 days. Even before the completion of its second week theatrical run, it surpassed the second week Karnataka gross collections of KGF: Chapter 2. By the end of two weeks, the film emerged as the highest-grossing film of Karnataka grossing ₹200 crore, whilst also becoming the second Kannada film to cross the ₹100 crore mark at the global box office, after KGF: Chapter 2.

The film grossed more than ₹730 crores by the end of its third weekend theatrical run. The film crossed the ₹750 crore mark during the third week of its theatrical run and grossed around ₹765 crores before the end of its third week amidst reports of having grossed ₹800 crores in three weeks. The film grossed ₹809 crores before the closure of its third week theatrical run and became the highest grossing Indian film of 2025 surpassing Chhaava. It concluded its run with a worldwide gross estimated to be ₹850–852 crore.

It was reported to be the first film to gross over ₹250 crore in Karnataka and also the only film to earn more than ₹200 crore within the state as of 2025. It became the sixth Hindi dubbed film to gross ₹200 crore in India after Pushpa 2: The Rule, Baahubali 2: The Conclusion, KGF: Chapter 2, Kalki 2898 AD and RRR. It became the second Indian film to gross a minimum of ₹50 crores in 5 languages after K.G.F: Chapter 2. It also became the fourth Indian movie to gross over Rs. 50 crore each in Karnataka, Tamil Nadu, Andhra Pradesh/Telangana, and Kerala, joining Baahubali 2: The Conclusion, KGF: Chapter 2 and Jailer.

In Malaysia, the film opened at third place behind the Indonesian movie Kitab Sijjin Dan Illiyyin and the Tamil film Idly Kadai. If fell to sixth place in its second week and dropped out of the top ten in third week, before re-entering the chart at eight place during the Deepavali week.

=== Critical reception ===
On the review aggregator website Rotten Tomatoes, 82% of 11 critics' reviews are positive, with an average rating of 6.5/10.

Janani K of India Today rated it 4/5 stars and said that "Rishab Shetty's film explores the man vs nature conflict and land rights, blending them with divinity, folklore, myth, and faith. The film is a brilliant cinematic showcase." Bollywood Hungama also gave it 4/5 stars, writing that "On the whole, KANTARA: A LEGEND – CHAPTER 1 is not just a prequel; it’s an experience that deepens the world Rishab Shetty created while taking it to far greater cinematic heights. With a story that blends devotion, power, and destiny, the film grips you with its spine-chilling pre-climax and thunderous climax, leaving behind an unforgettable impact." Kashvi Raj Singh of News 18 rated it 3.5/5 stars and said that "Despite some forgivable flaws, the film is a visual treat, and the second half will surely leave you jaw-dropped. Kantara: Chapter 1 is Rishab Shetty’s attempt at amalgamating Indian folklore with mainstream cinema, and this he does well." Sashidhar Adivi of Filmfare also gave it 3.5/5 stars, writing that "Kantara: Chapter 1 delivers a powerful visual spectacle that stirs emotions through its grandeur, emotional depth, and powerful performances." Arjun Menon of Rediff.com rated it 3.5/5 stars and observed that "Kantara: A Legend Chapter-1 is an ambitious, bold update of the ideas of the first film on a much bigger canvas."

Saibal Chatterjee of NDTV rated it 3/5 stars and wrote that "Kantara: A Legend – Chapter 1 is a manic, sometimes befuddling, mix of history, myth, cinematic craft and performative power. When the disparate components and conceits blend well, it is an undeniably compelling watch." Anandu Suresh of The Indian Express also gave 3/5 stars, noting that "While Rishab Shetty's 2022 movie had a soul, which communicated what it wished to say as loudly as the 'Woah!' of Guliga, in Kantara 2, all that remains is the scream, as the soul flickers in and out unsteadily." Abhimanyu Mathur of Hindustan Times also rated it 3/5 stars, stating that "Rishab Shetty almost excels in pulling off a worthy prequel aided by fine performances and visuals, but hurt by an uneven narrative."

Pranati A S of Deccan Herald gave it 2/5 stars and said that "The visually stunning prequel to Kantara has its moments, but it could have been better with sharper writing and a more grassroots politics." Sruthi Ganapathy Raman of The Hollywood Reporter India stated that "There's room for a lot more spectacle, folds in the larger story of resistance, and visual beauty in this Kantara prequel, even if it comes at the cost of lesser depth in writing." Nandini Ramnath of Scroll.in commented that "The 168-minute film sometimes has a little too much going on to be absorbed in a single viewing. Although unwieldy at times, Kantara: Chapter 1 maintains the enchantment through impeccable world-building and a balance of spectacle with ideas." Vivek M.V. of The Hindu observed that "Despite flaws, Kantara Chapter 1 is a worthy prequel that rides on its gigantic scale and fine performances of Rishab Shetty and Rukmini Vasanth." Sajesh Mohan of Onmanorama noted that Kantara: Chapter 1 places the tribals at the heart of the narrative, portraying their myths, struggles, and victories as central to the story. He highlighted how the film explores class and caste exploitation, as well as cultural appropriation, but also observed that the story remains largely male-oriented, missing an opportunity to challenge long-standing societal and cinematic stereotypes.

== Accolades ==
Award	Ceremony date	Category	Recipients	Result	Ref.
Iconic Gold Awards	19 February 2026	Best Actress (Pan India Movie)	Rukmini Vasanth	Won	
Indian National Cine Academy Awards	15–16 April 2026	Best Film - Kannada	Kantara: Chapter 1	Won	
Indian National Cine Academy Awards	15–16 April 2026	Best Actor - Kannada	Rishab Shetty	Won	
Indian National Cine Academy Awards	15–16 April 2026	Best Actress - Kannada	Rukmini Vasanth	Won	
Indian National Cine Academy Awards	15–16 April 2026	Best Director - Kannada	Rishab Shetty	Won	
