= Roopanthara =

2024 Indian anthology drama film

- Theatrical release poster
- Directed by: Mithilesh Edavalath
- Screenplay by: Mithilesh Edavalath; Raj B. Shetty (Dialogues)
- Produced by: Suhan Prasad; Parth Jani
- Starring: Raj B. Shetty; Hanumakka; Somshekhar Bolegaon; Lekha Naidu; Bharat GB; Anjan Bharadwaj; Salmin Sheriff
- Cinematography: Praveen Shriyan
- Edited by: Praveen Shriyan; Bhuvanesh Manivannan
- Music by: Midhun Mukundan
- Production companies: Mango Pickle Entertainment; Jani Entertainment
- Distributed by: Lighter Buddha Films
- Release date: 26 July 2024
- Running time: 152 minutes
- Country: India
- Language: Kannada

Roopanthara (transl. Metamorphosis) is a 2024 Indian Kannada-language anthology drama film produced by Suhan Prasad and Parth Jani under the banners of Mango Pickle Entertainment and Jani Entertainment. Written and directed by Mithilesh Edavalath in his directorial debut, the film stars an ensemble cast of Raj B. Shetty, Hanumakka, Somshekhar Bolegaon, Lekha Naidu, Bharat GB, Anjan Bharadwaj, and Salmin Sheriff. Apart from acting, Raj B. Shetty wrote the dialogues and provided additional screenplay.

The anthology consists of four stories focusing on self-transformation in humans, and the stories are set in different backdrops. The film follows a hyperlink narrative by making all the stories recalled by a storyteller in a dystopian future.

Roopanthara was released on 26 July 2024. It received positive reviews from critics praising the performances of the cast and calling it a confident debut of the director.

== Plot ==
The film is set in a bleak, dystopian future where basic essentials like clean air and water are scarce.

An old man is captured by armed people (or a gang) and threatened with death. To avoid this fate, he is asked to tell stories. The old man narrates four separate but thematically connected tales.

=== 1. An elderly couple’s dream and hardship ===
A husband and wife from a poor background wish to visit the city (Bengaluru) to fulfill the wife's wish. Their rural life, financial struggles, and health issues test their resolve. The Hindu

=== 2. A beggar woman accused ===
A woman living as a beggar is falsely accused of kidnapping a child. She faces social prejudice and the police system. A young constable, new on the job, becomes involved and observes how the system reacts.

=== 3. A local thug (goon) vs an IT worker ===
A minor conflict between a thug and a corporate/IT employee escalates, leading to violence. This forces the thug to confront his own life choices and consequences.

=== 4. A young man haunted by trauma and risky obsessions ===
A boy or young man deals with childhood trauma. He gets drawn into dangerous online games or anti-social activities as a coping mechanism.

As the stories unfold, the theme of transformation (self-change, moral awakening, hope amid hardship) becomes central.

By the end, the tales collectively raise questions about redemption, justice, human struggle, and whether people can change. It is implied that the old man's storytelling might itself be a metaphor for transformation.

== Cast ==
First story	Second story	Third story	Fourth story
Hanumakka as the old woman; Somshekhar Bolegaon as the old man	Lekha Naidu as the beggar; Bharat GB as a police constable and the narrator; Girish Jatti as a police officer	Anjan Bharadwaj as the dark web user	Raj B. Shetty as the goon; Jaishankar Aryar as the IT employee

== Production ==
Mithilesh Edavalath, who assisted filmmakers in Kannada and Malayalam films, was inspired to write after seeing a couple in Bangalore from North Karnataka in their traditional attire. To make his debut as a film director, he wrote various short stories based on people he met in real life and was also inspired by newspaper clippings. Edavalath initially made three, then five short films before realizing he could connect them into a feature film. He linked all four stories he wrote by creating a dystopian future to form a feature-length story, using the dystopian future as a device to introduce and connect them into one narrative. Upon finishing the script, he met Suhan Prasad, the producer of Ondu Motteya Kathe, after having seen the Raj B. Shetty starrer Ondu Motteya Kathe (2017). He narrated the story to Suhan Prasad, who liked it, and brought in Raj B. Shetty to contribute to writing dialogues and the additional screenplay. The cinematography was handled by Praveen Shriyan, who also edited the film alongside Bhuvanesh Manivannan.

== Soundtrack ==
The soundtrack of the film was composed by Midhun Mukundan.

Track listing
No.	Title	Lyrics	Singer(s)	Length
1.	"Kittale"	Raj B. Shetty	Chaithra J. Achar, Midhun Mukundan	1:58
2.	"Horatavayya"	Keerthan Bhandary	Midhun Mukundan	2:23
Total length:				4:21

== Reception ==
The film received positive reviews from critics and audience.

Sridevi S of The Times of India gave it three-and-a-half out of five stars and wrote, "Roopanthara offers a metamorphic experience, sans a bogged-down climax." Pranati A S of Deccan Herald gave it three-and-a-half out of five stars and wrote, "Roopanthara has an engrossing storyline with a well-written screenplay. However, the writing doesn’t fully transform into the emotions the story deserves. The film also has moments of preachiness and the repeated messages can sound like a broken record."

Shashiprasad SM of the Times Now gave it three-and-a-half out of five stars and wrote, "Roopanthara is one of the finest films in Kannada in recent times as it talks about living and life in four different spheres. Raj B Shetty is at his best - engaging storytelling coupled with amazing performances - make the film a must watch." A Sharadhaa of Cinema Express gave it three-and-a-half out of five stars and wrote, "These interconnected tales of struggle and redemption offer a deep critique of human nature and our quest for change, making Roopanthara a deeply affecting cinematic experience."

Sunayana Suresh of The South First gave it three-and-a-half out of five stars and wrote, "Roopanthara might not be everyone’s cup of coffee, but this strongly brewed tale will ensure those who watch it will reflect and introspect, which is what any good film must do to its audience." Prathibha Joy of OTTplay gave it three out of five stars and wrote, "Considering that the premise of Roopanthara rests on an old man’s story-telling skill to literally save his skin, the stories he tells had to be superlative, which they are not – they are basic at best and that is why the film takes flight, cruises along, but fails to soar."

Swaroop Kodur of The News Minute gave it three out of five stars and wrote, "Roopanthara, despite being a supremely sophisticated idea, is ultimately bogged down a little by its own ambition." Vivek M.V. of The Hindu gave the film a positive review and wrote, "The four-story Kannada anthology isn’t revelatory, yet director Mithilesh Edavalath makes the film consistently engaging thanks to the solid execution of his ideas."

Y. Maheswara Reddy of Bangalore Mirror rated the film three out of five stars and wrote that "Director Mithilesh Edavalath has handled four inter-connecting tales in the movie with much finesse.He also conveys an apt message to society, especially to those who are on the wrong path, on the need for reformation". A critic from Kannada Prabha wrote that the stories of love, justice and struggle for liberation captivate the audience and that despite a slow start, the film's cinematography and music are to be appreciated.
