= Su From So =

2025 Kannada film directed by J. P. Thuminad

- Directed by: J. P. Thuminad
- Written by: J. P. Thuminad
- Produced by: Shashidhar Shetty Baroda; Ravi Rai Kalasa; Raj B. Shetty
- Starring: Shaneel Gautham; J. P. Thuminad; Sandhya Arakere
- Cinematography: S. Chandrasekaran
- Edited by: Nithin Shetty
- Music by: Songs: Sumedh K. Score: Sandeep Thulasidas
- Production company: Lighter Buddha Films
- Release date: 25 July 2025
- Running time: 135 minutes
- Country: India
- Language: Kannada
- Budget: ₹5.50 crore (Note: Producers clarified the film was made on a production budget of ₹4.50 crores which increased to ₹5.50 crores including promotion expenses amidst trade speculated figure of ₹4 crores to ₹6 crores.)
- Box office: ₹125 crore

Su From So is a 2025 Indian Kannada language comedy drama film written and directed by J. P. Thuminad in his directorial debut and is produced by Shashidhar Shetty Baroda, Ravi Rai Kalasa, and Raj B. Shetty under Lighter Buddha Films. It stars Shaneel Gautham, J. P. Thuminad, Sandhya Arakere, Prakash Thuminad, Deepak Rai Panaje, Mime Ramdas and Raj B. Shetty.

Set in the coastal village of Marlur linked to Someshwara, the story follows Ashoka, a carefree young man whose innocent crush spirals into rumours of possession by a ghost named Sulochana, upending village life through a cascade of comedic supernatural events.

The film was released theatrically on 25 July 2025. Upon release, it received overwhelmingly positive reviews and became a commercial success. It also became the seventh highest-grossing Kannada film of all time and the second highest-grossing Kannada film of the year. The film was credited with bringing back large footfalls in Kannada cinema after Raajakumara (2017), KGF Series (2018–2022), Kantara (2022) and 777 Charlie (2022). The Hollywood Reporter India rated it one of the best Indian films of 2025. It was remade into Marathi as Tumbadchi Manjula (2026).

== Plot ==
Ashoka, a young painter in the village Maruluru, develops a crush on a woman. One night, while returning from a party, a drunk Ashoka peeps through the window of her bathroom. To escape, he acts like he is possessed by a ghost. From the next day, he finds himself at the center of unwanted attention. In an attempt to get rid of the "ghost", a timid priest is called, and Ashoka plays along, saying he is possessed by 'Kalpana', the ghost from the popular horror movie Kalpana (which itself is a remake of the 2011 Tamil film Kanchana). In the chaos, people mishear it as Sulochana.

A famous priest, Karunakar Guruji, is called to get rid of the "spirit", and he then concludes that Ashoka is indeed possessed by a spirit named 'Sulochana', hailing from the neighbouring town 'Someshwara'. Bizarre rituals are performed to exorcise the spirit from Ashoka's body in vain, as he inadvertently causes people to think that he is still possessed. As a last resort, the villagers go to Someshwara to find Sulochana, where they find a woman, Bhanu, whose mother, Sulochana, died not long ago. She is coincidentally the first prospective bride whom Ravi "Anna", a popular man in the village, had visited and rejected years ago, and, as fate has it, both are still unmarried.

Bhanu then regularly visits Ashoka's village to talk to her mother via Ashoka, to persuade her to leave his body, and he gradually learns of Bhanu's struggles, her uncle's harassment and his sexual advances towards her. To put an end to all of this, Ashoka dresses up to resemble Sulochana, goes to Someshwara, and beats up Bhanu's uncle. A fight then ensues between the villages, and Ravi Anna and the other villagers decide to end it by bringing Bhanu to Maruluru permanently. Ashoka, still pretending to be possessed, says that Bhanu must marry one of the men of Maruluru, and Ravi Anna, who developed feelings towards Bhanu during this time, agrees.

Ashoka then returns to normal, bringing an end to the pretentious act, while Bhanu and Ravi marry.

== Cast ==
- Shaneel Gautham as Ravi "Anna"
- J. P. Thuminad as Ashoka
- Sandhya Arakere as Bhaanu
- Prakash Thuminad as Chandra
- Deepak Rai Panaje as Sathisha
- Mime Ramdas as Yadhu
- Raj B. Shetty as Karunakar "Guruji"
- Pushparaj Bolar as Bhaava
- Mamtha Shetty as Mala, Chandra’s wife
- Manish Shetty as Guruji's assistant
- Prakruthi Amin as Appi, Ashoka's sister
- Tanishka Shetty as Chaithra, Ashoka’s love-interest
- Shiva Alike as Daamu
- Arjun Kaje as Prasada, Ashoka’s friend
- Utsav Vamanjoor as Chethu, Ashoka’s friend
- Vijayalakshmi B Rai as Sulochana, Bhaanu’s dead mother

== Production ==
The film marks the directorial debut of JP Thuminad, known for his appearance in the Kannada film Sapta Sagaradaache Ello – Side B. He played Deepak, the husband of Priya, acted by Rukmini Vasanth in the film. He has worked as an assistant and behind the scenes in several Kannada films. Also known for his works in tulu theatre, he has also acted in several tulu language film such as Meera, Kattemar, and Katapadi Katappa. The film has been produced by Shashidhar Shetty Baroda, Ravi Rai Kalasa and Raj B Shetty under the banner of Lighter Buddha Films. Set in the coastal Mangaluru–Udupi region of Karnataka, the title refers to Sulochana from Someshwar with its initialism Su from So. The music was composed by Sumedh K. The background score was composed by Sandeep Thulasidas, who is an associate of Sushin Shyam in several films.

== Soundtrack ==
The film's songs were composed by Sumedh K, an independent musician, debuted in the mainstream cinema with this film's soundtrack. The background score was composed by Sandeep Thulasidas. The first single Danks Anthem was released on 27 June 2025.

No.	Title	Lyrics	Singer(s)	Length
1.	"Danks Anthem"	Raj B. Shetty	Anurag Kulkarni	3:16
2.	"Scooter Song"	Prithvi Anta	Siddhartha Belmannu	3:47
3.	"Intro Song"	Raj B. Shetty	Indu Nagaraj, Vasuki Vaibhav	3:28
4.	"Prasada Song (Kalpana song)"	Raj B. Shetty	Sumedh K	3:18
5.	"Hennu Song"	Prithvi Anta	Chaithra J Achar, Vasuki Vaibhav	1:44
6.	"Gedde Song"	Prithvi Anta	Vijay Prakash, Anurag Kulkarni	3:02

== Release ==
=== Theatrical ===
Su From So was released theatrically in India on 25 July 2025. The film began with a single premiere in Mangaluru, followed by Shivamogga and Mysuru, quickly snowballed into 28 preview shows across Karnataka before its theatrical release on 25 July. The film's Malayalam dubbed version was released on 1 August 2025.

=== Distribution ===
The film was distributed in North India by AA Films. Its Malayalam dubbed version was released in Kerala by Dulquer Salmaan's Wayfarer Films and Mythri Movie Makers for Telugu release. The film was distributed internationally by Phars Films.

=== Home media ===
The post-theatrical streaming rights were acquired by JioHotstar. The film began streaming there from 9 September 2025. Colors Kannada has acquired the satellite rights for the film. The film premiered in Colors Kannada on 12 October 2025.

== Reception ==
=== Critical reception ===
Su From So received highly positive reviews from critics. Vivek M. V. of The Hindu wrote, "‘Su From So’, directed by debutant JP Thuminad and backed by actor-director Raj B Shetty, is helped by witty performances as it becomes a rare horror comedy that seamlessly blends thrills with a pertinent message". Susmita Sameera of The Times of India gave 4/5 and wrote "'Su from So' emerges as a refreshing entertainer that blends laughter, heartfelt moments, gentle romance, and a powerful message — wrapped in a wholesome package for the entire family to enjoy." A. Sharadhaa of The New Indian Express gave 4/5 and wrote "A must-watch, not just for horror or comedy fans, but for anyone who believes cinema can still surprise, subvert, and stay with you." Pranati A. S. of Deccan Herald gave 4/5 and wrote "Billed as a horror comedy, the film looks at what real life horror looks like. And notably, it never for a moment gets dull and preachy." Sanjay Ponnappa of India Today also gave 4/5 and wrote "Directed by JP Thuminad, this Kannada comedy is a fun ride filled with laughter throughout. The film weaves social drama with comedy and presents a beautiful story."

=== Remakes ===
Ajay Devgn and NS Rajkumar have, respectively, bagged Bollywood and Kollywood remake rights for this film.

=== Box office ===
Su From So sold over 3.80 lakh tickets in three days and became the first Kannada film in a long time to secure 72 early morning shows on a Sunday, all running to full houses, also on weekdays. The film sold 1.27 lakh tickets on BookMyShow on its second day and became highest ticket sold film from Kannada cinema in a single day. The film grossed ₹17.30 crore worldwide in five days. The film grossed ₹33–36 crore in 10 days. The net collection at the end of two weeks was reported to be ₹43 crore. It grossed ₹50.74 crore moving towards the end of two weeks in India. The film earned ₹2.5 crore from USA by 5 August 2025.

The film crossed ₹50 crore mark at the box-office and became one of the Kannada films to sell more than 1 million tickets on BookMyShow. Malayalam version grossed ₹2.30 crore in Kerala in six days. The film collected ₹57 crore worldwide in 15 days. Sakshi Post reported a gross of ₹62 crores. The total collections at the end of 18 days was ₹65 crore. In 19 days, the all-India domestic gross was reported to be ₹77.25 crore including ₹4.59 from the Malayalam version. The total gross was estimated to be around ₹86.40 crore including ₹9 crore from overseas. The film grossed ₹87 crore in 20 days.

The worldwide gross collections including that of the dubbed versions was estimated to be around ₹90 crore within three weeks of release. The film grossed ₹96 crore in 22 days including ₹12 crore from overseas. The film crossed the ₹100 crore mark at the box-office in 23 days of which over ₹70 crore was from Kannada version in Karnataka alone. The movie grossed ₹105 crore in 24 days. The movie grossed ₹8 crores from Gulf countries alone. The worldwide gross at the end of fourth weekend was reported to be ₹115 crore.

The movie had grossed ₹120 crores at the time of its OTT release - making it one of the most profitable Indian films in recent times. Though the movie was expected to close at ₹120 crores gross, the movie continued its theatrical run beyond that taking the worldwide gross theatrical collections to ₹121 crores to ₹125 crores.
