= 45 (2025 film) =

2025 Indian Kannada film

- Theatrical release poster
- Directed by: Arjun Janya
- Written by: Arjun Janya; Anil Kumar (dialogues)
- Produced by: M. Ramesh Reddy
- Starring: Shiva Rajkumar; Upendra; Raj B. Shetty; Kaustubha Mani
- Cinematography: Satya Hegde
- Edited by: K. M. Prakash
- Music by: Arjun Janya
- Production company: Suraj Productions
- Release date: 25 December 2025
- Running time: 144 minutes
- Country: India
- Language: Kannada
- Box office: ₹21 crore

45 is a 2025 Indian Kannada-language fantasy action film marking the directorial debut of music composer Arjun Janya. Produced by M. Ramesh Reddy under the Suraj Productions banner, the film features an ensemble cast including Shiva Rajkumar, Upendra, Raj B. Shetty, and Kaustubha Mani. Besides direction and music, Janya has co-written the film alongside Anil Kumar (dialogues). Cinematography is handled by Satya Hegde, with editing by K. M. Prakash.

Filming took place over approximately 80 days, primarily in Bengaluru and Mysore. The production is noted for its extensive use of visual effects with CGI works done by Canada based MARZ Studio. The official trailer premiered on 16 December 2025 during a high‑profile launch at Kempegowda Ground in Bengaluru. On 25 December 2025, it was theatrically released, and received mixed-to-positive reviews from critics.

== Plot ==
Vinay (Raj B. Shetty) is a carefree software engineer living a content, middle-class life with his loving mother and girlfriend Meghana (Kaustubha Mani). One day, he rides his two-wheeler without a helmet while talking on his phone and accidentally runs over a black dog named Rosie, owned by local don Rayappa (Upendra).

Rayappa, grief-stricken and enraged, confronts Vinay and condemns him for killing Rosie who he considered a mother figure. Instead of executing him immediately, Rayappa gives Vinay 45 days to reflect on his actions and relive life, invoking a concept from the Garuda Purana about the soul’s journey. Frightened and desperate, Vinay seeks refuge. His girlfriend Meghana approaches Muthu, another gangster, for protection. During this turmoil, Vinay meets Shivanna (Shiva Rajkumar), a humble and philanthropic figure who owns a residential colony called Kasturi Nivasa. Meanwhile, Vinay begins experiencing a vivid dream: he watches himself die in a road accident and then sees a sequence of events that eerily come true, including the fatal encounter with the dog. His growing awareness of these supernatural patterns deepens his fear and sense of impending doom.

Shivanna plays mentor and protector, guiding Vinay spiritually and practically as he tries to avoid Rayappa’s wrath. Rayappa is later revealed to symbolize Yamaraja (the Hindu god of death), pursuing Vinay to settle karmic scores. As the 45-day deadline ticks down, Vinay confronts his remorse, reconciles with his past mistakes, and struggles to outwit Rayappa. Shivanna, whose character unfolds more deeply, becomes Vinay’s shield and spiritual guide. Their bond strengthens as they navigate moral, emotional, and metaphysical challenges.

In the gripping climax, Vinay must face Rayappa in an ultimate confrontation. He draws upon the lessons he has learned to seek redemption, overcome fear, and defy his fate. Shivanna stands with him as they confront cosmic justice, culminating in a resolution that fuses philosophy with action, life with death, and the consequences of one man’s choices.

== Cast ==
- Shiva Rajkumar as Shivanna
- Upendra as Rayappa
- Raj B. Shetty as Vinay
- Rajendran as Muthu
- Kaustubha Mani as Meghana
- Jisshu Sengupta
- Pooja Ramachandran
- Sudha Rani as Sudha (special appearance)
- Vijayalakshmi Singh
- Pramod Shetty as Altaf Bhai
- Manasi Sudheer
- Ramesh Pandit
- Arasu
- Jafar Sadiq
- Mimicry Gopi
- Manju Pavagada
- Surya Praveen
- Nanda Kishore
- Malya Bagalakote
- Priya Savadi
- Jeethu Santhosh
- Aadi Madhugiri
- Shiva Balaji
- Ghanashyam Sankla
- Imran
- Rana Gowda
- Ranjith
- Thrivedi Nag
- Janardhan
- Baby Lekhana
- Master Arya Swaroop

== Production ==
=== Development ===
In July 2022, the film was announced, marking Arjun Janya's directorial debut following a successful career as a music composer. The project was conceived as an entertainer with philosophical themes and significant use of visual effects.

=== Filming ===
Over 80 days, principal photography took place in Bangalore and Mysuru. The film's cinematography was handled by Satya Hegde, editing by K. M. Prakash, art direction by Mohan Pandith, stunt were coordinated by Dr. K. Ravivarma, Jolly Bastian, Different Danny, and Chethan D’Souza; while dance sequences were choreographed by Chinni Prakash and B. Dhananjay.

Over 40% of the film features visual effects, handled by Monsters Aliens Robots Zombies (MARZ) Studio, a Canadian company known for Hollywood-grade VFX. This marks MARZ’s first collaboration with a Kannada film.

=== Marketing ===
In January 2025, the first motion poster was unveiled. Promotional material highlighted the film’s scale, VFX quality, and ensemble cast. The makers positioned it for a nationwide release in Kannada, Telugu, Tamil, Malayalam, and Hindi; distribution was handled by Mythri Movie Makers.

On 16 December 2025, the official trailer launch at Kempegowda Ground in Bengaluru, Hubballi, Mysuru, Tumakuru, and Udupi. It garnered attention for Shiva Rajkumar's woman avatar.

== Music ==
Arjun Janya has composed the soundtrack and background score for the film. The soundtrack consists of three songs and three instrumental theme music.

Kannada track listing
No.	Title	Lyrics	Singer(s)	Length
1.	"Afro Tapaang"	MC Bijju	MC Bijju, Nishan Rai	3:21
2.	"Shivam Shivam Sanaatanam"	V. Nagendra Prasad	Vijay Prakash	4:08
3.	"45 The Arrival"	Rahul Dit-O	Rahul Dit-O, Roousic, Nishan Rai	2:39

== Release ==
45 was theatrically released on 25 December 2025, coinciding with Christmas. Initially, the film was scheduled release on 15 August 2025, coinciding with India Independence Day, but it was postponed due to unfinished production work.

The satellite and digital streaming rights for the movie were acquired by Zee Network.

== Reception ==
Sanjay Ponnappa of India Today gave 3/5 stars and wrote "45 is a concept-driven multi-starrer that warrants a theatrical watch – for its ambition, its ideas, and for the coming together of Shiva Rajkumar, Upendra, and Raj B Shetty." Prathibha Joy of OTT Play gave 2.5/5 stars and wrote "A film – good or bad – has to evoke some emotion. Despite a lighter vein treatment to a heavy subject, there was a numbness that enveloped, a feeling that, in today’s jargon, is best described as ‘meh’. It’s not a rousing spectacle, neither is it underwhelming, but it’s also not one of those that leaves one wanting for more. That said, if the subject of 45 is a topic of interest, it would make for an interesting one-time watch. For me, this one didn’t quite cut it."

Pranati S of Deccan Herald wrote "‘45’ is billed as a visually rich film with VFX ‘amplified by an Oscar-winning team from Hollywood’. Unfortunately, the visual effects are underwhelming, and, in several places, outright shabby. The background score is excessively loud for most of the runtime, and the songs are just passable." Vivek MV of The Hindu wrote "While Arjun Janya’s ‘45’ dives into themes about life and death through a modern lens, it gets lost in its own complexity, leaving its lead actors Shivarajkumar, Upendra and Raj B Shetty to save the ambitious movie." A Shraddha of The New Indian Express wrote "45 is clearly a fantasy, and yet, it examines human mortality and the soul's journey."
