= Tumbadchi Manjula =

2026 Indian Marathi-language horror comedy film

- Directed by: Vividh Korgaonkar
- Written by: Rushikesh Turai; Yogesh Shirsat
- Produced by: Umesh Kumar Bansal; Bavesh Janavlekar
- Starring: Jitendra Joshi; Om Bhutkar; Makarand Anaspure; Sai Tamhankar; Usha Nadkarni
- Cinematography: Kaushal Goswami
- Edited by: Mayur Hardas
- Production company: Zee Studios
- Distributed by: Zee Studios
- Release date: 5 June 2026
- Running time: 152 minutes
- Country: India
- Language: Marathi
- Budget: ₹6 crore
- Box office: est.₹19.17 crore

Tumbadchi Manjula is a 2026 Indian Marathi-language comedy-horror film directed by Vividh Korgaonkar. The screenplay was written by Rushikesh Turai, with dialogues by Turai and Yogesh Shirsat. The film stars Jitendra Joshi, Om Bhutkar, Makarand Anaspure, Sai Tamhankar, and Usha Nadkarni in pivotal roles. It is a remake of the 2025 Kannada blockbuster Su From So, directed by J. P. Thuminad.

Produced and distributed by Zee Studios, Tumbadchi Manjula was released theatrically on 5 June 2026. The film received a positive response from both critics and audiences upon release and emerged as a commercial success, grossing ₹19.17 crore worldwide within 35 days and became the fourth highest-grossing Marathi film of 2026.

== Plot ==
Keshav, a young man who harbours a crush on a local girl, is humiliated in public by Ravi Anna, the village's go-to authority figure, after inadvertently getting into trouble. To save face and exact symbolic revenge, wishing to slap Ravi Anna as he himself was slapped, Keshav falsely claims that the spirit of a woman named Manjula has entered his body.

The lie quickly spirals out of control. When Keshav repeats the story, village tantrik Karunakaran Guruji concludes that the spirit must be that of a Manjula who once lived in the neighboring village of Tumbbad. The entire village marches to Tumbbad and approaches Shobha, Manjula's daughter, asking if she has knowledge of her mother's restless spirit. Since the spirit is entirely fabricated, Shobha naturally has no answer to offer.

Shortly afterwards, Shobha arrives at Keshav's village seeking shelter from an abusive uncle. The community, however, turns a cold shoulder and sends her back. In a twist that merges old regrets with new beginnings, it is revealed that Ravi Anna had rejected Shobha fifteen years earlier over her appearance. The comedic chaos finally resolves on a warm and heartfelt note when Ravi Anna decides to marry Shobha, bringing the village's supernatural hysteria to a close and delivering the film's underlying message about blind faith, superstition, and the treatment of women.

== Cast ==
- Jitendra Joshi as Ravi Anna
- Om Bhutkar as Keshav
- Sai Tamhankar as Shobha
- Makarand Anaspure as Karunakaran Guruji
- Usha Nadkarni as Ajji
- Anshuman Vichare as Satish
- Priyal Naik as Darshana
- Atharva Ruke
- Ganesh Pandit
- Shardul Saraf
- Umesh Jagtap
- Yogesh Shirsat
- Abhay Khadapkar
- Varsha Dandale
- Diya Rane
- Siddheshwar Zadbuke as Ranga
- Mamta Shirodkar
- Aditya Lonkar
- Sachin Kale
- Anil More
- Makrand Mayekar
- Kedar Samant
- Aakash Sakpal
- Sakshi Manjrekar
- Reena Maral
- Charuhas Panzari
- Shara Sanjay
- Nameeta Gavkar
- Sujata Shelatkar
- Pooja Rane
- Janhavi Mayekar
- Pranali Kasale
- Shweta Kudalkar
- Dinesh Patil
- Manjunath
- Devendra Gavade
- Shraddha Khanolkar
- Gopal Terekholkar
- Smita
- Sunil Malekar
- Priyal Mother
- Rupesh Nevgi
- Bhavana Prabhu

== Soundtrack ==
Track listing
No.	Title	Lyrics	Music	Singer(s)	Length
1.	"Assa Vegala Gaav"	Vikram Edke	Prateek Omkar Kelkar, Zariya, Tejas Aditya Joshi	Rahul Deshpande, Aarya Ambekar	3:56
2.	"Jhadana Dharlay Bhoot"	Vikram Edke	Zariya, Prateek Omkar Kelkar, Tejas Aditya Joshi	Avadhoot Gupte	1:55
3.	"Taraat"	Vikram Edke	Zariya, Prateek Omkar Kelkar, Tejas Aditya Joshi	Vishal Dadlani	2:50
4.	"Hey Deva Mala Paav Ki Re"	Cyli Khare	Cyli Khare	Cyli Khare	7:12
5.	"Punha Punha"	Manoj Yadav	Saurabh Bhalerao	Hariharan, Nidhi Hegde	4:05
6.	"Nabh Soneri Soneri"	Vaibhav Deshmukh	Saurabh Bhalerao	Aanandi Joshi	4:56
Total length:					24:54

== Release ==
Tumbadchi Manjula was released theatrically on 5 June 2026. The trailer generated considerable pre-release interest, with audiences drawn to the ensemble cast and the film's rural comedy backdrop.

== Reception ==
Nandini Ramnath of Scroll.in said that "The film's tone is set by the reliably loud Usha Nadkarni, playing a selectively low-sighted store owner. Tumbadchi Manjula comes off as slapstick, the attack on gullibility and blind faith lost somewhere between Keshav's fibs and Ravi Anna's controlling ways. The Marathi adaptation is so-so." Mayur Sanap of Rediff said that "The story follows Keshav (Om Bhutkar), a carefree young man whose attempt to hide an embarrassing mistake sparks a rumour that he is possessed by the spirit of an elderly woman. Instead of Sulochana, the ghost here is named Manjula. This seemingly harmless lie spreads quickly, and people begin to add their own bits to the story."

== Box office ==
Despite facing competition from releases such as Deool Band 2 and Raja Shivaji, the film benefited from strong word-of-mouth publicity, with its show count increasing from 391 on opening day to 500 by Sunday.

The film witnessed an unusual upward trend during the weekdays, earning ₹70 lakh on Monday (Day 4) and ₹72 lakh on Tuesday (Day 5), both surpassing its opening-day collections. It recovered its production budget within six days of release.
