= Gubbi Mele Brahmastra =

2019 Indian Kannada romantic comedy film

- Theatrical poster
- Directed by: Sujay Shastry
- Written by: Pradeep BV; Sujay Shastry; Prasanna V M
- Produced by: T.R.Chandrashekhar
- Starring: Raj B. Shetty; Kavitha Gowda
- Cinematography: Suneeth Halgeri
- Edited by: Srikanth Shroff
- Music by: Manikanth Kadri
- Production company: Crystal Park Cinemas
- Release date: 15 August 2019
- Country: India
- Language: Kannada

Gubbi Mele Brahmastra (Note: lit. 'Attacking a sparrow with the Brahmastra'; a Kannada idiom similar to "use a sledgehammer to crack a nut") is a 2019 Indian Kannada romantic comedy film written and directed by Sujay Shastry making his debut. The film is produced by T.R.Chandrashekhar under his banner Crystal Park Cinemas. It features Raj B. Shetty and Kavitha Gowda in the lead roles. The supporting cast includes Pramod Shetty, Shobraj, Babu Hiranniah, Manjunath Hedge and Aruna Balraj. The score and soundtrack for the film is by Manikanth Kadri. The cinematography is by Suneeth Halgeri and editing is done by Srikanth Shroff.

== Plot ==
Venkata Krishna "Krissh" Gubbi is a software engineer who is irritated by his parents' efforts to arrange his marriage right away, preferring to slow down and find love on his own. He messages a woman, "Purple Priya", on Facebook, and after some mishaps meets up with her and they agree to get hitched. However, his wry but dim-witted friend Nani, afraid that Gubbi will abandon him, sabotages their relationship by going to her parents house in his place and rejecting her. Gubbi learns of this and manages to patch things up, but then Priya is kidnapped by Robin Hood, a don who Gubbi and Nani had run into before. Robin Hood agrees to let Priya go if he robs an ATM van, which turns out to be surprisingly easy; then, he gives him a harder task: kidnapping the daughter of another don, Venkat Reddy, across the state border in Andhra Pradesh, so that Robin Hood can marry her as they are in love.

Gubbi and Nani set out to find Halli, a kidnapping expert near the border, but almost get in trouble with the police for their ATM theft and accidentally insult Halli and his henchman Shradda when they find him. Nevertheless, Halli agrees to help him, but warns of Venkat Reddy's extreme power and violent tactics, and sends Gubbi on a test run, where he gets distracted and is caught but manages to run away. Gubbi is put up to training by Halli, and then manages to make it inside the compound without getting caught and pulling off the abduction. Gubbi and Nani drive back to Robin Hood's place, where they argue and Nani leaves as they wait for Robin Hood. However, it turns out that they kidnapped Venkat Reddy's wife instead of his daughter, to rectify the situation, Gubbi goes back and offers a "swap", but Venkat Reddy's rowdies take his whole family until he can find her. As it turns out that Nani accidentally switched cars as he left, Gubbi's difficulties are further compounded

Finally, Venkat Reddy finds Halli (who turns out to have been working in his security detail and is possibly a police plant), Robin Hood and Priya and ties everyone up. However, Nani sneaks in and unties them, After another gang attempts a fake deal with Venkat Reddy to swindle him, a fight breaks out. Climatically, Robin Hood and Gubbi rescue Venkat Reddy, winning his admiration, but Gubbi scares Priya with his use of guns and she breaks if off with him. Three months later, a depressed Gubbi and Nani attend Robin Hood's wedding. Spotting Priya, Gubbi makes up with her to Nani's frustration, but the ceremony is interrupted when the bride is kidnapped by a new don in Malaysia, "Little Mary". Robin Hood asks Gubbi to rescue her; he refuses, but turns around to see that Priya has been kidnapped again by Robin Hood's underlings, setting up a possible sequel named "Gubbi in Malaysia".

== Cast ==
- Raj B. Shetty as Venkata Krishna Gubbi
- Kavitha Gowda as Purple Priya
- Sujay Shastri as Nonda Nani
- Pramod Shetty as Robinhood
- Shobhraj as Venkat Reddy
- Babu Hirannaiah as Father of Purple Priya
- Manjunatha Hegde as Gopalkrishna Gubbi
- Aruna Balraj as Rukmini Gubbi
- Girish Shivanna as Alphesh Kumar

Special appearance in "Swagatam Krishna" song:

- Shubha Punja
- Karunya Ram
- Rachana

== Production and release ==
The film began with its principal photography on 18 June 2018 and followed its shoot from the next day. The film had Raj B.Shetty on board first followed by Kavitha Gowda. The film completed its shooting on 1 April 2019. The film team had earlier announced 9 August as the release date on account of Varamahalakshmi festival but later they postponed it a week later on 15 August on account of Independence Day to avoid clashes with other films.

== Soundtrack ==
Gubbi Mele Brahmastra

Soundtrack album by Manikanth Kadri
- Studio: Kruthi Audios Bengaluru, Kadriskeys Studios Chennai
- Genre: Feature film soundtrack
- Language: Kannada
- Label: Crystal Music
- Producer: T.R. Chandrashekhar

The film's background score and the soundtracks are composed by Manikanth Kadri The music rights were acquired by Crystal Music

Tracklist
No.	Title	Lyrics	Singer(s)	Length
1.	"Yenanno Helalu Hogi"	Jayanth Kaikini	Karthik	3:02
2.	"Swaagatam Krishna"	Ootukkaadu Venkatasubba Iyer, Sujay Shastry	Mythri Iyer	4:14
3.	"How is the Josh Athiratha Ninna Tolbala"
Total length:				7:16

== Reception ==
The Times of India paper rated 3/5 and wrote "Comedian Sujay Shastry makes his debut as a director with Gubbi Mele Brahmastra. He does a decent job and also hints at a possible sequel to this film. While one has seen blatant slapstick humour and loads of double entendres in Kannada comedy films, this one has a tad more cleaner approach to the genre.Raj B Shetty seems to have an extension of his character from Ondu Motteya Kathe and he shines. Sujay, as Raj's pessimistic philosopher friend, is a hoot. Each of the cast member seems to be carefully picked. Be it Girish Shivanna as the comical inspector or Pramod Shetty as the costume wearing don, they all shine. Though, at times the gags are dragged a bit. But, for those who like comedy, Gubbi Mele Brahmastra is going to be a treat, as it is reminiscent of some of the classics from the 80s and 90s."
