= Raj B. Shetty =

Indian actor, director, choreographer and screenwriter

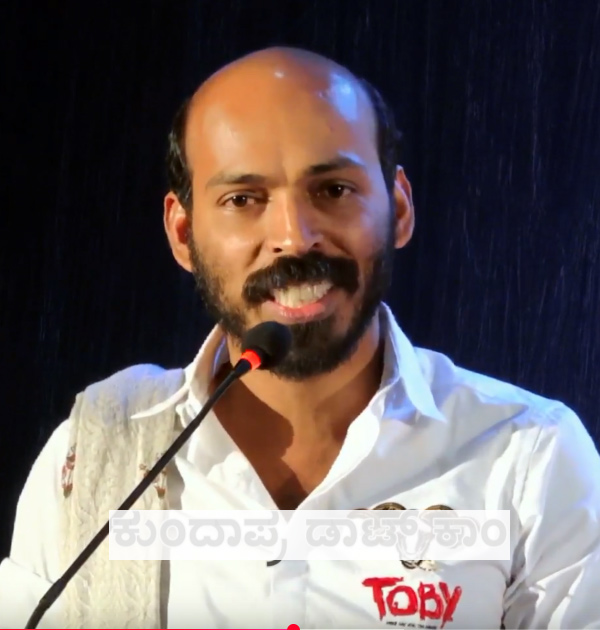
- Shetty in 2023
- Born: 5 July 1987 (age 39); Bhadravathi, Karnataka, India
- Occupation: Actor • director • filmmaker • writer . film producer
- Years active: 2015 – present

Raj B. Shetty (born 5 July 1987) is an Indian actor, director, screenwriter, producer and filmmaker who primarily works in Kannada cinema and has appeared in Malayalam films. He owns a production house named Lighter Buddha Films and has co-produced several of his films.

Known for his rooted storytelling and unique cinematic style, Shetty rose to fame with his debut film Ondu Motteya Kathe (2017) and later directed the critically acclaimed Garuda Gamana Vrishabha Vahana (2021). His debut in Malayalam cinema came through Rudhiram (2023).

He has won several prestigious awards, including the Filmfare Award for Best Director – Kannada for Garuda Gamana Vrishabha Vahana and the Filmfare Award for Best Kannada Film for Ondu Motteya Kathe. His films have also earned SIIMA Awards and multiple critics’ choice honors, cementing his reputation as one of the most influential voices in contemporary Kannada cinema.

== Early life ==
Shetty was born on 5 July 1987 in Bhadravathi, Karnataka, into a Tulu-speaking Bunt family. He completed his schooling at Bharathi English Medium School, Mangalore, and pursued a postgraduate degree in Social Work from Roshni Nilaya, Mangalore. Before entering films, Shetty worked as a radio jockey at Big 92.7 FM, wrote advertising scripts, and directed short films in Kannada and Tulu. He also assisted actor-director Upendra Rao as a writer and assistant director.

== Career ==
=== 2017–2020: Debut and breakthrough ===
Shetty began his cinematic journey in 2017 with Ondu Motteya Kathe, a romantic comedy that he wrote, directed, and starred in. The film was produced by Pawan Kumar and became a sleeper hit, praised for its simplicity and Shetty’s natural performance as a bald protagonist navigating love and societal expectations. Critics lauded his ability to blend humor with emotional depth, and the film earned him the Filmfare Award for Best Film – Kannada, establishing him as a promising filmmaker.

In 2018, Shetty appeared in Ammachi Yemba Nenapu, a film based on Vaidehi’s short stories, where his nuanced portrayal of a supporting character was appreciated for its authenticity. The following year, 2019, saw him in multiple projects including Mahira, Gubbi Mele Brahmastra, and Katha Sangama. His segment in Katha Sangama, directed by Kiranraj K., showcased his versatility as an actor. He also contributed dialogues for Sarkari Hi. Pra. Shaale, Kasaragodu, Koduge: Ramanna Rai, collaborating with director Rishab Shetty.

In 2020, Raj played Kubera in Mayabazar 2016, a dark comedy that received positive reviews for its ensemble cast. However, his career-defining moment came in 2021 with Garuda Gamana Vrishabha Vahana, which he wrote, directed, and starred in alongside Rishab Shetty. The film, set in Mangaluru’s underworld, was hailed as a masterpiece for its poetic storytelling and powerful performances. Critics compared Shetty’s direction to world cinema greats, and his portrayal of Shiva—a complex, brooding gangster—earned widespread acclaim. The film swept awards, including Filmfare Best Director (Kannada) and SIIMA Best Film. In 2021, his next assignment, Pedro, directed by Natesh Hegde was screened in film festivals.

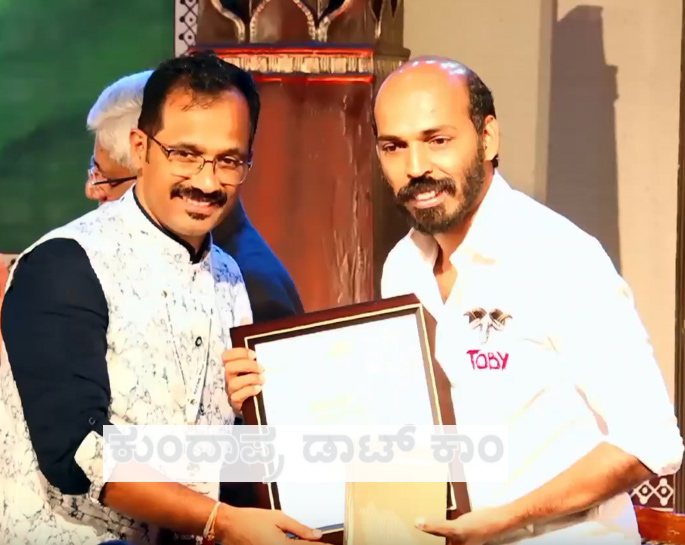
Raj B. Shetty being felicitated, in 2023

=== 2022–present:Critical acclaim and career expansion ===
In 2022, Shetty appeared in 777 Charlie, directed by Kiranraj K., where his cameo was noted for its emotional impact. He also acted in Thurthu Nirgamana and choreographed the intense climax of Kantara, showcasing his creative versatility. The year 2023 brought Swathi Mutthina Male Haniye, a poignant drama he directed and starred in, exploring themes of grief and healing. His performance in Toby, directed by Basil Alchalakkal, was described as “raw and transformative,” earning him critical praise.

Raj expanded his horizons in 2024 with his Malayalam debut in Mammootty’s Turbo, where he played a pivotal antagonist role. Critics in Kerala praised his screen presence and ability to adapt to a new language and industry. He also featured in Malayalam projects like Kondal and Rudhiram, further cementing his pan-South Indian appeal.

Shetty initially started out as an RJ and a short filmmaker. He gained recognition through his directorial debut, Ondu Motteya Kathe (2017), which was a huge commercial success. He further cemented it with Gubbi Mele Brahmastra (2019), Mayabazar 2016 (2020), and Garuda Gamana Vrishabha Vahana (2021), which got widespread acclaim and is now considered to be one of the best films of Kannada cinema.

In 2025, Shetty produced and acted in Su From So, directed by J. P. Thuminad, which became a blockbuster horror-comedy. His other projects include 45 and Bandar, both highly anticipated for their experimental narratives.

== Personal life ==
Raj B. Shetty is an avid animal lover and owns pet dogs named Jiggi and Maria. His love for dogs influenced his role in 777 Charlie. He enjoys reading and writing stories in his leisure time.

He has frequently voiced the issues of writers in the Kannada film industry. He considers Cinematographer and editor Praveen Shriyan as one of the pillars of his films.

== Film production ==
Shetty owns a prominent production house called Lighter Buddha Films, which he co-founded with cinematographer-editor Praveen Shriyan in 2019. The name reflects their philosophy of creating meaningful cinema while maintaining a light-hearted approach to the process. The company has backed several acclaimed Kannada films, including Garuda Gamana Vrishabha Vahana (2021), Swathi Mutthina Male Haniye (2023), and Toby (2023). In 2025, Lighter Buddha Films produced Su From So, marking the banner’s commitment to introducing fresh talent and experimental genres. Raj has stated that the goal of his production house is to champion new voices and faces in Kannada cinema, ensuring that stories rooted in local culture reach a wider audience.

== Filmography ==
Key
†	Denotes films that have not yet been released

- All films are in Kannada language unless otherwise noted.

=== As actor ===
Year	Title	Role	Notes	Ref.
2017	Ondu Motteya Kathe	Janardhana		
2018	Ammachi Yemba Nenapu	Venkappayya		
2019	Mahira	Pratap		
2019	Gubbi Mele Brahmastra	Venkata Krishna Gubbi		
2019	Katha Sangama	Vini	Also singer for "Life Untu"	
2020	Mayabazar 2016	Kubera		
2021	Pedro	Vigilante		
2021	Garuda Gamana Vrishabha Vahana	Shiva		
2022	777 Charlie	Dr Ashwin Kumar		
2022	Thurthu Nirgamana	Shivu		
2023	Toby	Toby		
2023	Swathi Mutthina Male Haniye	Aniketh		
2024	Turbo	Vetrivel Shanmugha Sundaram	Malayalam film	
2024	Ekam	Dhanaraja	Television series; episode "Dombaraata"	
2024	Roopanthara	Goon	Anthology film	
2024	Kondal	Daniel	Malayalam film	
2024	Rudhiram	Dr. Mathew Rosy	Malayalam film	
2025	Su From So	Karunakar "Guruji"	Also producer	
2025	Bandar	Lizard Man	Hindi film	
2025	45	Vinay		
2026	Landlord	Sanna Dhani		
2026	Rakkasapuradhol	Shiva		
2026	Karavali	Maveera		
TBA	Pocket Novel †	TBA	Tamil film	
TBA	Seyon †	TBA	Tamil film	

=== As director ===
Year	Film	Roles	Notes	Ref.
2017	Ondu Motteya Kathe	Janardhana		
2021	Garuda Gamana Vrishabha Vahana	Shiva		
2023	Swathi Mutthina Male Haniye	Aniketh		

=== As writer ===
Year	Film	Writer	Roles	Notes	Ref.
2019	Sarkari Hi. Pra. Shaale, Kasaragodu, Koduge: Ramanna Rai	Dialogues	—N/a		
2022	777 Charlie	Dialogues	Dr. Ashwin Kumar		
2023	Toby	Yes	Toby		
2024	Roopanthara	Dialogues, additional screenplay	Goon	Also presenter	

== Awards ==
Film	Award	Category	Result	Ref.
Ondu Motteya Kathe	65th Filmfare Awards South	Best Film Kannada	Won	
Ondu Motteya Kathe	7th SIIMA Awards	Best Debut Actor	Nominated	
Ondu Motteya Kathe	7th SIIMA Awards	Best Debut Director	Nominated	
Garuda Gamana Vrishabha Vahana	67th Filmfare Awards South	Best Director Kannada	Won	
Garuda Gamana Vrishabha Vahana	67th Filmfare Awards South	Best Actor	Nominated	
Garuda Gamana Vrishabha Vahana	10th South Indian International Movie Awards	Best Film	Won	
Garuda Gamana Vrishabha Vahana	10th South Indian International Movie Awards	Best Director	Nominated	
Garuda Gamana Vrishabha Vahana	10th South Indian International Movie Awards	Best Actor in a Negative Role	Nominated	
Swathi Mutthina Male Haniye	69th Filmfare Awards South	Best Director – Kannada	Nominated	
Swathi Mutthina Male Haniye	69th Filmfare Awards South	Best Actor – Kannada	Nominated	
Turbo	Mazhavil Entertainment Awards	The Entertainer of the Year - Negative Role	Won	
Roopanthara	70th Filmfare Awards South	Best Supporting Actor - Kannada	Nominated	
Roopanthara	13th South Indian International Movie Awards	Best Actor in a Supporting Role- Kannada	Nominated	
