= 4 Musics =

Indian band

4Musics
- Also known as: The 4Musics
- Origin: Cochin Kerala, India.
- Genres: Rock; Folk; Classical
- Years active: 2003 present
- Label: NHQ
- Members: Biby Mathew; Jim Jacob; Eldhose Alias; Justin James; Jimson James
- Website: 4musics.in

4Musics is an Indian music composers group from Kerala consisting of four core members: Jim Jacob, Eldhose Alias, Biby Mathew, and Justin James. The group was founded in 2003. Their debut album, Mazhathulli, was released in 2007. Following the release of their album, they entered the Malayalam cinema film industry as music directors in the movie Juzt Married. The group mainly focuses on folk, melodic, and Indian pop musical styles.

They are also the founders of NHQ (Noise Headquarters) recording studio in Cochin. The band became famous through Oppam, a movie released in 2016. A song in the movie "Minungum Minnaminunge" became popular on social media and YouTube.

== History ==
=== Early years ===
In 2003, Biby and Jim began collaborating on musical compositions, initially focusing on Christian devotional music. Both were members of the choir at Azhakam St. Mary's Jacobite Church. Their first collaborative project was the devotional album Karunardrasneham, released in 2003. They subsequently joined a devotional music band formed by Sanil Peter, where they met Jimson James, who later became a member of 4 Musics. During this period, Jimson proposed the idea of forming a Western music band named 9-1-B-C.

=== 2003–2007 ===
In mid-2003, they formed 9-1-B-C, which initially consisted of ten members. Eldhose Alias and Justin James, Jimson's brother, subsequently joined the group. The band performed at various venues in and around Ernakulam and made its television debut in 2004 on Kairali TV's programme Confusion.

By 2006, the band had become inactive as several members left India to pursue higher education. Jim and Jimson moved to Ireland, Justin relocated to New Zealand, and Eldhose moved to Bangalore. During this period, Biby continued working in music, composing for two devotional albums, Samarppanam and Unni Ganapathy. He also collaborated with Binoy and Babu Varghese, a member of David's Harp, on karaoke performances.

=== 2008–2015 ===
In 2008, the members reunited and began working on their first musical album, Mazhathulli. Jim, Biby, Eldhose and Justin jointly composed the songs, while Biby and Eldhose contributed lyrics to eight of the album's ten tracks. However, the album was not released, and the group subsequently became inactive again.

In 2010, Jim completed a course in sound engineering and music technology at Pulse College, associated with Windmill Lane Recording Studios in Ireland. Following his return to India, he established NHQ Studios in Panampilly Nagar, Kochi. The group later reunited for a performance on Asianet's Youth Club, where they presented several original compositions. Their performance attracted the attention of the programme's director, Jibin, and sound engineer Sony, who recommended them for their first film project.

The group made its debut as film composers with Juzt Married, directed by Sajan Johny and written by Benny Esthappan. Although the film was produced earlier, it was released in 2015. The group was credited under the name The Four.

=== 2016–present ===
Towards the end of 2015, the group met with producer Antony Perumbavoor, which led to an opportunity to compose music for Oppam (2016), directed by Priyadarshan and starring Mohanlal. Produced by Aashirvad Cinemas, the film's soundtrack received widespread attention and helped establish the group in the Malayalam film industry. They subsequently composed the music for Villain (2017), another Mohanlal-starrer, followed by Ittymaani: Made in China (2019) and Brother's Day (2019), directed by Kalabhavan Shajohn and starring Prithviraj Sukumaran.

During the production of Oppam, the group changed its professional name from The Four to 4 Musics. Eldhose, who was based in Saudi Arabia during the film's production, rejoined the group in India towards the end of 2016.

== Discography ==
Year	Title	Language(s)	Ref.
2015	Juzt Married	Malayalam	
2016	Oppam	Malayalam	
2017	Villain	Malayalam	
2017	Sadrishavakyam 24: 29	Malayalam	
2019	Oru Caribbean Udayippu	Malayalam	
2019	Ottam	Malayalam	
2019	Kavacha	Kannada	
2019	Maffi Dona	Malayalam	
2019	Ittymani Made in China	Malayalam	
2019	Brother's Day	Malayalam	
2019	Vijay Superum Pournamiyum	Malayalam	
2020	Aghori	Tamil	
2020	Meezan	Malayalam	
2020	Masthans	Malayalam	
2020	Oru Guzzeted Yakshi	Malayalam	
2021	Vidhi	Malayalam	
2021	Mission C	Malayalam	
2022	Innale Vare	Malayalam	
2022	Choran	Malayalam	
2023	Anuradha Crime No.59/2019	Malayalam	
2023	Alone	Malayalam	
2023	Marathakam	Malayalam	
2023	Jawanum Mullapoovum	Malayalam	
2023	Siberian Colony	Malayalam	
2023	Mango Muri	Malayalam	
2023	@	Malayalam	
2023	Rajni	Malayalam, Tamil	
2024	Samadhana Pusthakam	Malayalam	
2024	Rudhiram	Malayalam	
2024	Barroz	Malayalam	Trailer Music

== Other ventures ==
=== B4M - NHQ ===
Noise Headquarters is the seedbed of 4 MUSICS. NHQ is one of the recording studios in South India.

=== STUDIO 6/8 ===
The studio owned completely by 4 Musics. Situated in Girinagar, cochin, one of the facilities for sound recording and music production.

==== David’s Harp Members ====
- Babu Varghese ( Vocalist, Composer, Lyricist )
- Biby Mathew ( Vocalist, Composer, Lyricist )
- Eldhose Alias ( Vocalist, Composer, Lyricist )
- Jim Jacob ( Vocalist, Composer)

== Awards ==
- Asianet film awards 2016 Best Music director
- Mangalam Music Awards 2017 Popular music director
- Indywood excellence Award for the upcoming Music director 2017
- Kerala Film Critics Association Award 2017 for the Best Music Director
- Mangalam Music Awards 2018 Best Music Director
- 6th Kalabhavan Mani Awards 2025 Best music director
