= J. P. Thuminad =

Indian film director, writer, and actor

- Born: 1986 or 1987 (age 39–40); Manjeshwar, Kasaragod, Kerala, India
- Occupations: Film director; writer; actor
- Years active: 2017–present
- Notable work: Su From So (2025)
- Spouse: Rashmika (m. 2026)

Jaya Prakash Thuminad popularly known as J. P. Thuminad is an Indian film director, writer, and actor known for his work in Kannada and Tulu films. He is best known for his directorial debut in the 2025 film Su From So, a supernatural comedy-drama that gained both critical acclaim and commercial success.

== Early life and background ==
J. P. Thuminad was born in the coastal village of Manjeshwara, located in the Kasaragod district of Kerala. Thuminad initially worked as a painter in the construction industry, and later became theatre artist.

== Theatre beginnings and early career ==
Thuminad started his acting career in the theatre, where he became part of many local productions. Thuminad made his acting debut in the 2017 Kannada film Ondu Motteya Kathe, directed by Raj B. Shetty.

== Career in cinema ==
=== Directorial debut ===
Thuminad made his directorial debut with the film Su From So in 2025. The movie is a mix of elements of horror-comedy combined with social commentary, focusing on village life and folklore. For this film, Thuminad chose many actors from local theatre groups, to bring authenticity and naturalism to their performances. The film received positive reviews from critics for its storytelling, direction, and performances.

=== Themes and approach ===
Thuminad's filmmaking style is noted for its emphasis on regional cultures, especially on the coastal folk traditions of Karnataka and Kerala. His film Su From So is noted for its style on portraying real human emotions and regional stories, while incorporating supernatural themes and comedy.

== Impact and recognition ==
Thuminad's debut film and its commercial success marked a significant moment for Kannada film industry, especially for independent filmmakers working outside the mainstream cinema. The success of Su From So has been viewed by many critics as a testament to the viability of small-budget films with strong regional and cultural narratives.

== Personal life ==
Thuminad was born in the village of Manjeshwar, located in the Kasaragod district of Kerala. His upbringing in a region where Kannada, Malayalam and Tulu cultures intersect has had a significant influence on his storytelling and film making style. Before entering films, he worked as a painter for a construction company. Despite his success as a filmmaker, Thuminad expressed his intention to continue working in the theatre. He married longtime partner Rashmika on 5 May 2026.

== Filmography ==
=== Films ===
Key
†	Denotes films that have not yet been released

Year	Film	Director	Actor	Language	Notes	Ref.
2017	Ondu Motteya Kathe	No	Yes	Kannada	Uncredited role	
2018	Katapadi Kattappa	Yes	No	Tulu		
2021	Garuda Gamana Vrishabha Vahana	No	Yes	Kannada	Played the role of Avinash	
2023	Swathi Mutthina Male Haniye	No	Yes	Kannada	Played the role of Prabhakar	
2023	Sapta Saagaradaache Ello: Side B	No	Yes	Kannada	Played the role of Deepak	
2025	Su From So	Yes	Yes	Kannada	Played the role of Ashoka	
2026	Kattemaar	No	Yes	Tulu	Played the role of Mahesh	

=== Television & Theatre ===
- Various - Regional theatre & short films (Tulu/Kannada theatre) - Artist / Writer / Director (theatre).
- 2017 - Majaa Bharatha - Colors Kannada - Contestant
