= Villain (2017 film) =

2017 film directed by B. Unnikrishnan

- Theatrical release poster
- Directed by: B. Unnikrishnan
- Screenplay by: B. Unnikrishnan; Vincent Vadakkan (Dialogues)
- Produced by: Rockline Venkatesh
- Starring: Mohanlal; Vishal; Srikanth Meka; Raashii Khanna; Hansika Motwani; Manju Warrier
- Cinematography: Manoj Paramahamsa
- Edited by: Shameer Muhammed
- Music by: Score: Sushin Shyam; Songs: 4 Musics; Sushin Shyam
- Production company: Rockline Entertainments
- Distributed by: Aashirvad Cinemas; Maxlab Cinemas and Entertainments; RD Illuminations
- Release date: 18 October 2017 (India)
- Running time: 144 minutes
- Country: India
- Language: Malayalam

Villain is a 2017 Indian Malayalam-language neo-noir psychological action thriller film written and directed by B. Unnikrishnan and produced by Rockline Venkatesh. The film stars Mohanlal in the lead role along with an ensemble cast including Vishal, Srikanth Meka, Raashii Khanna, Hansika Motwani, Manju Warrier, Siddique, Chemban Vinod Jose, Renji Panicker, Saikumar and Aju Varghese in supporting roles. Manoj Paramahamsa was the cinematographer. The songs were written by 4 Musics and the film score was composed by Sushin Shyam.

The story revolves around ADGP Mathew Manjooran, a senior IPS officer renounces his office after taking a sabbatical but is re-enlisted to deal with one last case involving a series of connected murders. Principal photography began on 3 March 2017 in Thiruvananthapuram, Kerala and ended in mid-June. It was the first Indian film to be completely filmed in 8K resolution. Villain was released in India on October 18, coinciding with the Diwali holiday. It received generally mixed-to-positive reviews from critics. It also marked the Malayalam debut for Vishal, Raashii Khanna, Hansika Motwani and Srikanth Meka.

== Plot ==
The plot begins with the murder of three men who are killed by drug injection at gunpoint. ADGP Mathew Manjooran IPS is retiring after a sabbatical; on his last day at work, he is called by DGP Muhammad Mansoor to investigate the case. Mathew is initially reluctant to help the Police in investigating the case, but realizing the pressure on Mansoor and aware of his medical condition, finally decides to take over the case. He is aided by two officers: ASP Harshitha Chopra and DSP Iqbal. Harshitha says she saw a woman wearing a burqa rushing into a restaurant on the night of the murder; she offered help, but the woman refused and ran away. Seven months ago, Mathew arrested notorious drug lord Felix. D. Vincent, who escapes from custody. Mathew and his wife Neelima accompany their daughter to her new college in Delhi. While en route, he receives a duty call and returns to work, leaving his family to continue their journey on their own. Their car is hit by a lorry, leaving their daughter dead and Neelima comatose.

Meanwhile, three more men are murdered in the same fashion; the victims have a connection with Tharakan's hospital. Mathew deduces the killer to be Shaktivel Palanisamy, a Tamil doctor who works at the hospital. Shaktivel's dark past reveals that his father committed suicide, and witnessing his death causes Shaktivel mental trauma; he sees incidents of malpractice in the hospital, and after graduating, he starts killing the perpetrators, with his girlfriend Dr. Shreya (the woman in the burqa) as an accomplice. Mathew requests that Mansoor relieve him from the case, as the culprit is now revealed, and decides to leave the manhunt to the state police machinery. Harshitha finds out that Felix murdered Mathew's family. She informs Mathew, who already knows this and shows no interest. They receive a video message from Shreya, revealing Felix's location.

Mathew fights Felix and is about to kill him, but draws back, realizing that Shaktivel had targeted Felix, and instead arrests him. Mathew learns that Iqbal helped Felix escape from police custody and asks Iqbal to surrender to the police. He then discovers that Shaktivel's next target is Mansoor, who threatened a patient named Khalid Musthafa in Tharakan's hospital, who later died in an unknown accident. Mathew is sedated, and Shreya takes him to Shaktivel, who plans to kill Mansoor in front of him. Mansoor convinces Mathew that he had threatened Musthafa, fearing a great financial loss, but has no role in his death. Mathew tries to dissuade Shaktivel, who believes that the legal system is corrupt and that what he does is alternative justice. He reveals that Mathew mercy-killed Neelima. They argue and engage in hand-to-hand combat; Mathew defeats Shaktivel, but spares him because he believes that Shaktivel could still become a good doctor after treating his mental illness, were he is taken for mental treatment by police along with Sreya. Mathew is then seen building a school, completing Neelima's last wish.

== Cast ==
- Mohanlal as ADGP Mathew Manjooran IPS
- Vishal as Dr. Shaktivel Palanisamy
- Srikanth Meka as Felix D. Vincent
- Raashii Khanna as ASP Harshita Chopra IPS (Voice dubbed by Shweta Menon)
- Hansika Motwani as Dr. Shreya Venkatesh (Voice dubbed by Angel Shijoy)
- Manju Warrier as Dr. Neelima Mathew
- Siddique as DGP Muhammad Mansoor IPS
- Renji Panicker as IG Sreenivasan IPS, City Police Commissioner, Thiruvananthapuram
- Chemban Vinod Jose as DYSP Iqbal
- Athira Patel as Malavika Mathew aka Malu
- Aju Varghese as Churutt Kannappi
- Sai Kumar as Dr. Ram Kumar
- Kozhikode Narayanan Nair as Khalid Musthafa
- Anand as Dr. Dhanesh Tharakan
- Kottayam Nazeer as Retired DYSP Vinod Abraham
- Balaji Sarma as Mohan Nair, State Drug Controller officer
- Irshad as Kumar Valiyaveedan
- Sanju Sivram as Shravan
- Idavela Babu as CPO Babu Nair
- Pradeep Chandran as CI Chandran
- Vishnu Govindan as Pipe Kunjumon
- Muthumani as Dr. Geetha, Forensic Chief Officer
- Antony Perumbavoor as SI Joy K. Thomas (Cameo appearance)

== Production ==
=== Development ===
Following the release of Mr. Fraud (2014) starring Mohanlal, B. Unnikrishnan announced in May 2014 that his next film will also have Mohanlal in the lead role. Unnikrishnan's initial plan was to make a sequel to his 2012 film Grandmaster starring Mohanlal, but this was cancelled due to difficulty in obtaining rights from UTV Motion Pictures; its parent The Walt Disney Company had ordered the closure of its Indian productions. In 2016, he planned a project with Mohanlal and Prithviraj Sukumaran, which did not materialise. Unnikrishnan abandoned five projects before choosing his self-written project Villain. In July 2016, he said the film would be a thriller with an ensemble cast and that filming would commence in three months.

In September 2016, Unnikrishnan said the project was experiencing some technical problems. During the initial discussions, the film was set against the backdrop of a village, which was later tweaked. He completed the screenplay in two-and-a-half years and estimated a high production cost. In early December 2016, he announced the project was scheduled to begin filming on 20 January 2017 for a release that May; the film would be distributed by Maxlab Cinemas and Entertainments.

Initially, Aashirvad Cinemas and HG Entertainment were signed to jointly produce the film; they conducted a preliminary pooja function on 14 December and a few scenes were filmed. Regular filming was scheduled to begin in January as planned. Filming was later rescheduled to commence in March for a July release. Pre-production work was still underway in January 2017. The same month, it was announced that Rockline Venkatesh would produce the film under the Rockline Entertainments company, marking their maiden production in Malayalam. Mohanlal announced the film's title on 7 March 2017. According to Unnikrishnan, it is an "investigative thriller".

=== Filming ===
The film's pooja function was held at the Pazhavangadi Ganapathy Temple in Thiruvananthapuram, Kerala, on 2 March 2017. Principal photography commenced the following day in Kuravankonam, Thiruvananthapuram, beginning with shots featuring Khanna. Filming took place at Merryland Studio and around Chala marketplace. An investigation office set was created at Merryland Studio. The film's art director was Gokuldas. Mohanlal joined on 5 March. Filming underwent at various places in and around Thiruvananthapuram during early March 2017.

The schedule was expected to conclude by 20 March, after which the location would be shifted to Ernakulam. First schedule concluded on 19 March and second schedule began in Kochi on 24 March. Srikanth joined towards the end of this month. During the filming in the first week of April, Mohanlal was spotted with a different look. It was reported to be for some flashback scenes. Warrier joined the filming on 14 April. The second schedule was concluded in Vagamon on 18 April 2017. Post-production began before the final schedule commenced.

After a month-long break, the final schedule began in June 2017 in Ernakulam. Vishal and Motwani joined in the first week. Some hospital scenes featuring Vishal were filmed in Edappally. For the filming of a song sequence including Vishal and Motwani, a set was constructed in Ernakulam. Vishal spent 20 days filming for the project. On 10 June, the team returned to Vagamon to film portions of the climax; Mohanlal joined for a 10-day schedule. Filming concluded on 19 June 2017 in Vagamon.

The complete filming process was initially planned to take 50 – 55 shooting days. The film's editor was Shameer Mohammed, who used a technique known as spot editing (editing on location). Villain is the first Malayalam film to have colour grading done live on location during the filming process. Visual effects (VFX) were used in 47 minutes of footage, which according to Unnikrishnan is unrecognisable because it was used in the background of some natural scenes. A Poland-based company was in charge with the film's visual effects department. Stunt coordinators were Ravi Varma, Ram Laxman and Action G. Manoj Paramahamsa and N. K. Ekambaram were the cinematographers.

Villain is the first Indian film to be filmed entirely in 8K resolution; Red's Weapon Helium 8K S35 camera was used in the film. As of 2017, no theatres in Kerala are equipped with 8K projection, and only a few even have 4K. Unnikrishnan said most Indian films are filmed in 1.8K resolution and are upscaled to 2K or 4K for theatre screening, which results in a loss of quality. Unnikrishnan chose to use a Zeiss Otus lens that was designed for use in still cameras. Before filming began, he and cinematographer Manoj Paramahamsa conducted test shoots; his inference was that Otus lenses, having high sensitivity and sharpness, will multiply the workload of a focus puller but will compensate with a greater output. Low lighting was extensively used in the film, which has no static shots.

=== Themes ===
According to Unnikrishnan in Malayala Manorama, Villain is "a compelling story of crime and detection" that "has predominant elements of politics and philosophy woven into it" and "is more intense than all my previous [films]". The tagline "Good is Bad" was revealed in a poster featuring a black-and-white image of Mohanlal's character.

== Music ==
The film's score was composed by Sushin Shyam, and the original soundtrack consists of five tracks composed by the music group 4 Musics (Jim Jacob, Biby Matthew, Eldhose Alias, and Justin James). All of the songs—except "Angakale Chengathiraniye", which was written by Engandiyur Chandrasekharan—were written by B. K. Harinarayanan. The music rights of Villain were bought by the label Junglee Music for a Malayalam-film-record amount of ₹50 lakh. Dubbing rights to the songs were sold for ₹1 crore. The soundtrack album was released digitally and on DVD on 13 September 2017; a music launch function was held at Kochi for the occasion. Besides acting, Khanna made her Malayalam singing debut when recording the film's title track in April 2017.

Villain (Malayalam)
| No. | Title | Writer(s) | Performer(s) | Length |
|---|---|---|---|---|
| 1. | "Angakale Chengathiraniye" | Engandiyoor Chandrasekharan | Shakthisree Gopalan, Niranj Suresh | 03:51 |
| 2. | "Kandittum" | B. K. Harinarayanan | K. J. Yesudas | 04:04 |
| 3. | "Kandittum Kandittum" | B. K. Harinarayanan | Sithara | 04:04 |
| 4. | "Pathiye Nee" | B. K. Harinarayanan | Haritha Balakrishnan | 04:34 |
| 5. | "Villain Theme" | B. K. Harinarayanan | Niranj Suresh, Raashii Khanna | 03:28 |
| Total length: | | | | 20:01 |

Mr. Villain (Tamil)
| No. | Title | Performer(s) | Length |
|---|---|---|---|
| 1. | "Kanalae Nee En Mogamae" | M. M. Manasi, Syed Subahan | 03:54 |
| 2. | "Kannukul Kannukul" | Madhu Balakrishnan | 04:05 |
| 3. | "Kandikka Kandikka" | Latha Krishna | 04:04 |
| 4. | "Adadadaaa" | Pooja Vaidyanath | 04:33 |
| 5. | "Villain Theme" | Pooja Vaidyanath, Syed Subahan | 03:27 |
| Total length: | | | 20:03 |

Puli Joodham (Telugu)
| No. | Title | Performer(s) | Length |
|---|---|---|---|
| 1. | "Kalalo Raegae Mougamae" | M. M. Manasi, Syed Subahan | 03:54 |
| 2. | "Aravindam Aravindam" | Madhu Balakrishnan | 04:05 |
| 3. | "Aravindam" | Latha Krishna | 04:05 |
| 4. | "Kadhali Raa" | Pooja Vaidyanath | 04:33 |
| 5. | "Villain Theme" | Pooja Vaidyanath, Syed Subahan | 03:28 |
| Total length: | | | 20:05 |

== Marketing and release ==
The teaser trailer was released online on 27 April 2017; it set a record for a Malayalam film by accruing a million views in three hours. Villain's overseas distribution, Hindi dubbing and satellite rights were sold to RKD Studios for ₹2.5 crore, ₹3 crore, and ₹7 crore respectively—a record amount for a Malayalam film. The release date was announced after the film was censored by the Central Board of Film Certification on 6 October 2017. Advance booking in theatres in Kerala began from 22 October 2017. Villain was released in India on 27 October 2017 in a Malayalam-film-record number of 273 screens in Kerala. It had more than 1,100 shows on its opening day, beginning with early screenings for fans. The premiere fan show was at HMT Theatre in Bangalore at 07:00 and fan shows in Kerala were scheduled to begin at 08:00. The film had 156 fan shows in Kerala, the highest for any film in the state. Villain was released internationally from 2 November 2017, debuting in the United Arab Emirates.

=== Home media ===
The film was dubbed and released in Hindi as Kaun Hai Villain by RKD Studios in 2018, in Telugu as Puli Joodham in 2019, and twice in Tamil: Mr. Villain in 2019 and Malayappa in 2022.

== Reception ==
=== Box office ===
On its opening day, Villain grossed ₹4.91 crore (₹49.1 million) at the Kerala box office, setting a record for the highest statewide first-day gross for a Malayalam film. The film collected ₹12 crore (₹120 million) in its opening three-day weekend. It grossed a total of ₹20 crore from Kerala box office.

Villain grossed $441,977 from 49 screens in the United Arab Emirates in the opening weekend (2 – 5 November)—second best opener of that weekend (behind Thor: Ragnarok) and $531,508 in three weeks. It grossed US$36,583 in the United States and US$5,214 in Canada in three weeks, A$2,355 in Australia in two weeks, £26,867 in the United Kingdom in three weeks and NZ$6,255 in New Zealand in two weeks.

=== Critical response ===
Villain received generally mixed-to-positive reviews from critics. Rating it 3 stars out of 5, Sanjith Sidhardhan of The Times of India said: "Mohanlal as the veteran cop, who has endured pain but masks it, showcases his finesse as an actor. One of the strengths of the film is that it doesn't bank on his superstar image and rather focuses on the narrative, which at times is choppy at best ... BGM [film score] by Sushin Shyam adds to the tense scenes and the action sequences too are choreographed well". Prem Udayabhanu from Malayala Manorama rated 3 stars out of 5, writing, "Only Mohanlal can enact the lingering pain of a personal tragedy with such subdued finesse ... the cop doesn't falter in his clinical observations to join the dots, but that is not the case with the narrative of Villain. Perhaps the emphasis of the filmmakers was on its treatment, and on that count, it is a justified attempt."

Awarding 3 on a scale of 5, Meera Suresh from The New Indian Express wrote: "Many might criticise Villain for its slow pace, which is disappointing for a cop story. But, then, when a movie deals with 'grey areas' of life, it is not easy to be taut and steady ... Mohanlal's latest may not be a thrilling edge-of-the-seat outing, but it takes a different route, one that is enjoyable." Calling Mohanlal's performance "brilliant", she added that his "subdued performance lifts the character to another level". Baradwaj Rangan of Film Companion South called it "Yet another thriller that mistakes surface coolth for depth"

Indo-Asian News Service's critic awarded 3 out of 5 stars and commented: "Villain works fine as long as it doesn't begin to lean on Hollywood prototypes. The indigenous strain is well woven into the thriller ... the director never lets his characters lose track of their place in the jigsaw". The review also said the film is "very handsomely mounted and shot" and "builds on Mohanlal's power to express rage and grief without letting go", and praised Vishal's performance. Manoj Kumar R. of The Indian Express rated it 2.5 stars out of 5 and commented that the film "has some well written and well-shot scenes that establish the mood of the character. Mohanlal is convincing as a dejected copy, who is stuck in the past and looking for a reason to continue living ... the screenplay is intriguing and sets in an element of suspense". He also praised Vishal's performance.

Directors N. Lingusamy, Mysskin, Pandiraj, Thiru and Suseenthiran were all positive about the film, particularly praising the actors' performances and its making. S. R. Praveen wrote in The Hindu: "B. Unnikrishnan's attempt here was not to deliver a straight, taut thriller, but to build a slow-burner, with an emotional family drama and the unravelling of a psycho killer all weaved together. But it is too much load to carry for a script that is short on imagination". Rating the film 2 stars out of 5, Priyanka Sundar of Hindustan Times said the film's "slow pace, heavy dialogues and disconnected character arc take the thrill out of this investigative thriller", and also criticised the script.
