= M. Ramesh Reddy =

Indian film producer

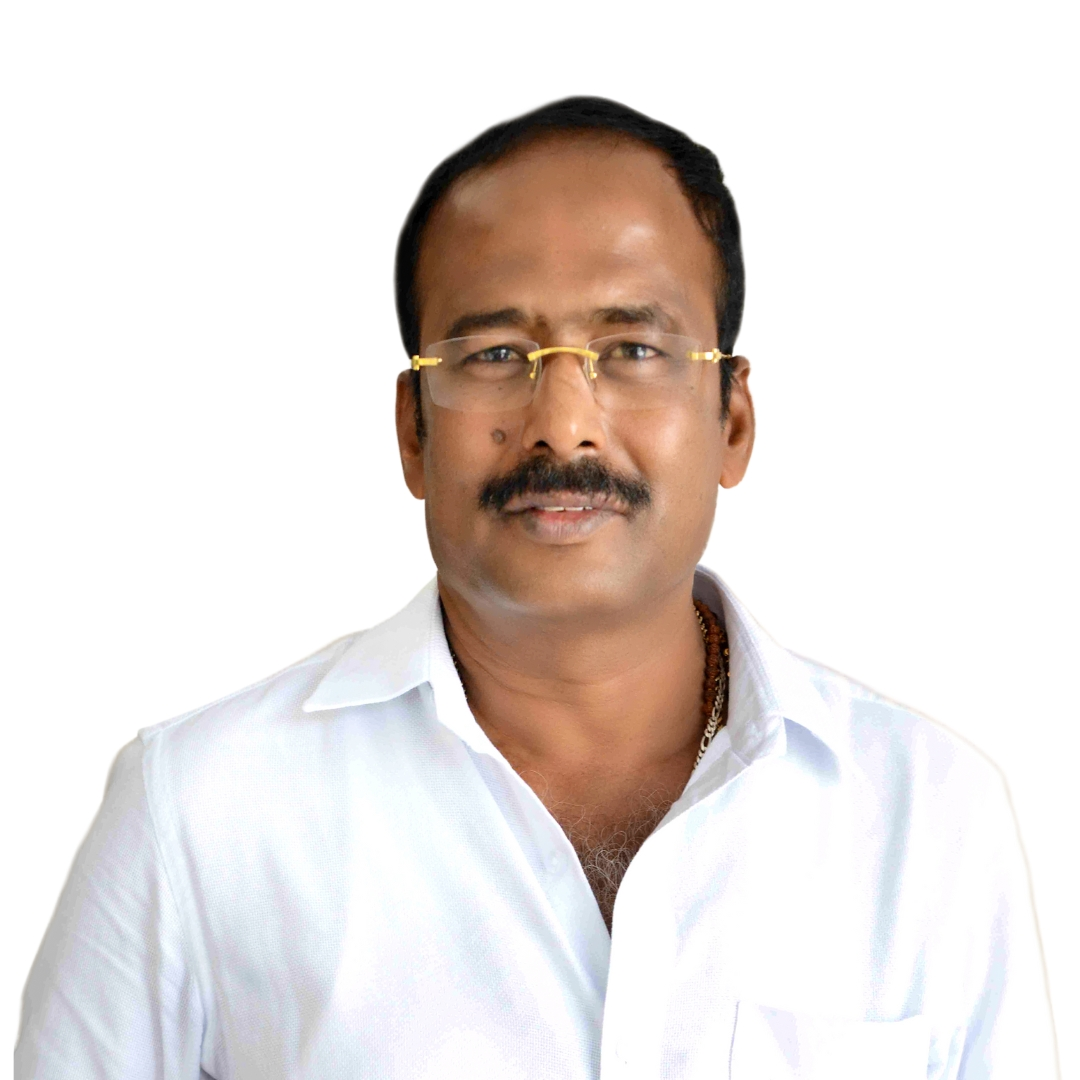
- Born: Nangali, Karnataka, India
- Occupation: Film Producer | Suraj Productions

M. Ramesh Reddy is an Indian film producer who mainly works in South Indian film industry. He established Suraj Production. He is a National Film Awardee renowned for his fashionable and passionate approach to cinema.

== Early life ==
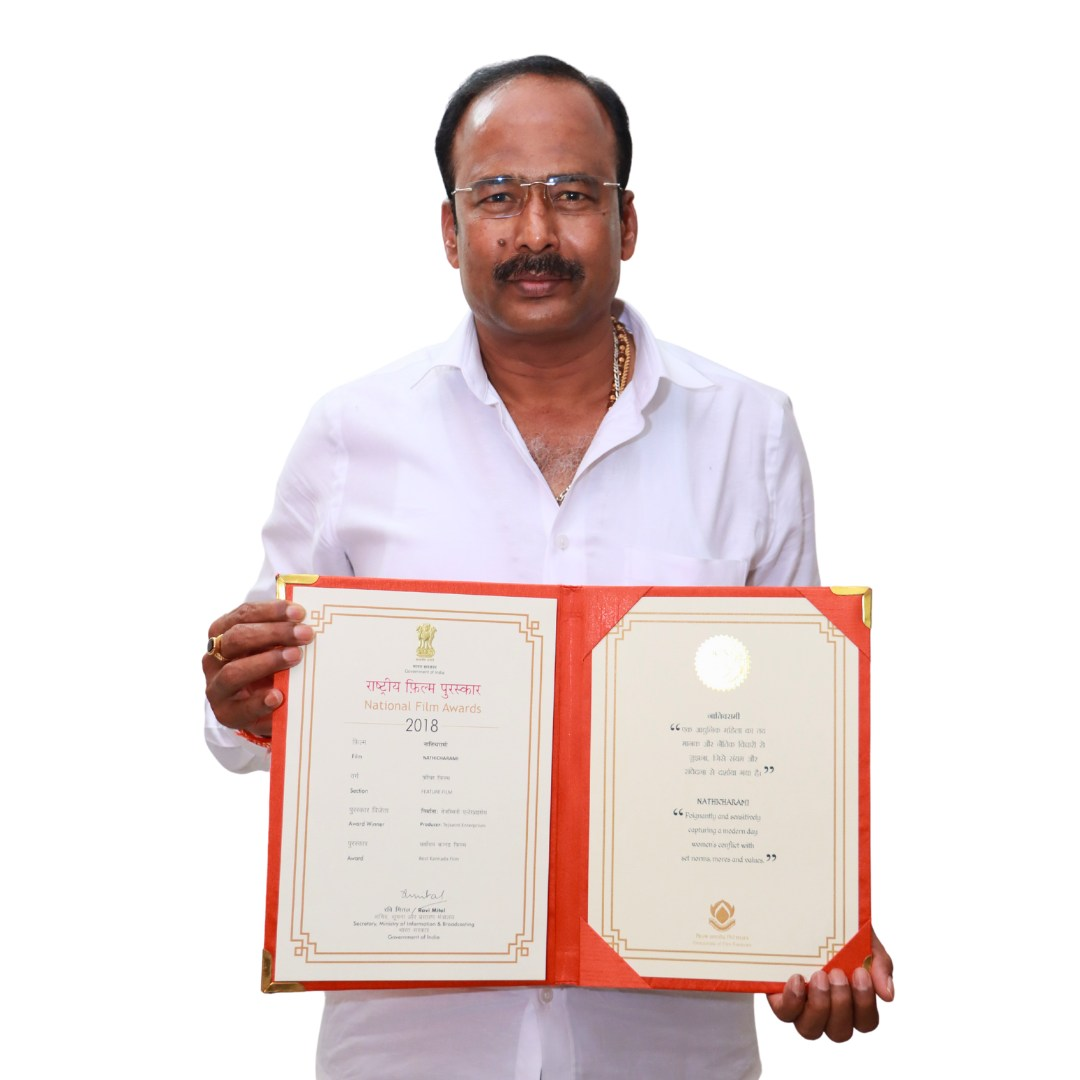
M Ramesh Reddy holding a National Award Certificate

He is a civil contractor, who has transitioned into the role of a film producer, and his productions have left a notable impact on the film industry. M. Ramesh Reddy was born in Nangali, Karnataka, belongs from a lower-middle-class family and began working as a contractor. He become a vendor for Infosys in 2012 and met Sudha Murty.

== Film career ==
M. Ramesh Reddy started his career as a film producer in 2017 with his film Uppu Huli Khara. In the name of Tejaswini Enterprises, he produced 2017's Musical Hit film PaddeHuli, which is a remake of the 2017 Tamil film Meesaya Murukku. The film starred Nishvika Naidu, Shreyas Manju and directed by Guru Deshpande.

Ramesh Reddy produced Nathicharami in 2018 with actors Sruthi Hariharan and Sanchari Vijay. In 2019, Reddy produced Padde Huli. Then he released a film titled 100 with Dr Ramesh Aravind in 2021.

After the series of commercial failures, Ramesh Reddy produced Gaalipata 2 the sequel of the classic & musical hit Gaalipata. The film was considered as 2022's blockbuster with record breaking collections. The film was directed by Yograj Bhat and starred with Ganesh, Anant Nag, Diganth and Pawan Kumar.

Later, he remade Nathicharami in Malayalam titled Neeraja in 2023. He also remade 100 as Dil Hai Grey with Urvashi Rautela for Hindi Language in 2023.

In 2023 & 2024, he is producing a Pan Indian Movie titled "45" directed by Arjun Janya starring Dr. Shiva Rajkumar, Dr. Upendra & Raj B Shetty. The film budget is set to 100+ crores and shall release in Kannada, Tamil, Telugu & Malayalam.

== Filmography ==
Year	Film	Comments
2017	Uppu Huli Khara	Producer
2018	Nathicharami	Producer
2019	Padde Huli	Producer
2021	100	Producer
2022	Gaalipata 2	Producer
2022	Neeraja	Producer
2024	Dil Hai Grey	Producer
2024	45†	Producer

== Awards & Recognition ==
In addition to receiving these awards, Mr. Ramesh Reddy has been actively involved in contributing to short film festivals, film festivals, and film award functions for the past two years. He has also participated in the Karnataka Chalanachitra Cup (KCC), where celebrities from the Kannada film industry come together to play cricket as various teams. Wodeyar Chargers & Hoysala Eagles, under the leadership of Suraj Productions, are the teams in which he is involved.

Award / Recognition Name	Awarded by	Awardee
National Film Awards 2018	Government of India	Feature Film Producer - Naaticharami 2018
NETPAC International Jury Prize for Kannada Cinema 2019	11th Bengaluru International Film Festival	Feature Film Producer - Naaticharami 2018
National Award Recognition	Karnataka Chitra Rasikara Sangha	Feature Film Producer - Naaticharami 2018
Kannada Rajyotsava Prasasti 2021	The News Papers Association of Karnataka	For the service in the Construction field, Entertainment & Society
Special Recognition	ChitraSante Film Awards 2022	For the contribution to the film industry
Mother Teresa Memorial National Award for Social Justice	The National Press Council of India with The News Papers Association of Karnataka	For the service in the Construction field, Entertainment & Society
Excellence Award	Chittara Star Awards 2022	For the contribution to the film industry
Brand Excellence Award	Chittara Star Awards 2023	For the contribution to the film industry
Best Film Shot in Foreign Locations	IIFTC Tourism Awards 2023	Feature Film Producer - Gaalipata 2 - 2023
