= Alone (2023 film) =

2023 film directed by Shaji Kailas

- Theatrical release poster
- Directed by: Shaji Kailas
- Written by: Rajesh Jayaraman
- Produced by: Antony Perumbavoor
- Starring: Mohanlal
- Cinematography: Abinandhan Ramanujam; Pramod K. Pillai
- Edited by: Don Max
- Music by: 4Musics
- Production company: Aashirvad Cinemas
- Distributed by: Aashirvad Release
- Release date: 26 January 2023
- Country: India
- Language: Malayalam
- Budget: ₹2.5 crore
- Box office: ₹55 ലച്ചം

Alone is a 2023 Indian Malayalam-language mystery thriller film directed by Shaji Kailas, written by Rajesh Jayaraman, and produced and distributed by Antony Perumbavoor through Aashirvad Cinemas. The story is set during the 2020 COVID-19 pandemic in India. It stars Mohanlal as the only character appearing in the film which otherwise features voice roles as supporting cast. 4Musics composed the film's background score and songs.

The film was developed during the COVID-19 pandemic in India as a small film that can be made within pandemic restrictions to help unemployed workers in Malayalam film industry. Principal photography lasted 18 days from September to October 2021. The film was originally meant to be a direct-to-OTT release.

Alone was released in theatres on 26 January 2023 and received negative reviews from critics and audiences. The film was a box office bomb.

== Premise ==
Kalidas is a motivational speaker who starts living in a prominent flat in Kochi during the COVID-19 lockdown, with a need for something. As it is a COVID-affected area, no contact with anyone is possible, Kalidasan experience paranormal activities in the flat and begins to unravel the mystery. He tries to find out the mystery behind the paranormal activities seen in his flat. He seeks help from Yamuna, who arranged him the flat.

== Cast ==
- Mohanlal as Kalidas, the only character seen on-screen, is stranded in an apartment building during the COVID-19 pandemic in India.

=== Voice cast ===
- Prithviraj Sukumaran as Hari Bhai
- Manju Warrier as Yamuna
- Annie Shaji Kailas as Dr. Susan
- Siddique as Karthavu (Association President)
- Nandu as Santhosh, the apartment's Chief security guard
- Baiju Santhosh as ASI Rasheed
- Shankar Ramakrishnan as Vinod
- Renji Panicker as Colonel
- Mallika Sukumaran as Kalidas's Neighbour
- Suresh Krishna as Thomas Kuruvila, the caretaker of the apartment
- Rachana Narayanankutty as Sreedevi
- Zeenath as Sheela Varky
- Jose as Binoy

== Production ==
=== Development ===
Shaji Kailas said that Alone was developed after Mohanlal put forward a proposal to make a "small film" during the COVID-19 pandemic in India to help unemployed workers in film industry during the pandemic. For which, producer Antony Perumbavoor enquired for potential stories, to whom Kailas suggested a single character film about a man named Kalidas who gets trapped in Kerala during the pandemic while travelling from Coimbatore. Mohanlal and Kailas were collaborating for a film after 12 years. The screenplay was written by Rajesh Jayaraman. The title was announced on 4 October 2021. By then, filming had already begun. The title comes with the tagline "real heroes are always alone".

=== Filming ===
Principal photography of the film began on 27 September 2021. Filming was concluded on 22 October. The whole filming process was completed in 18 days. Kailas took the project after he had begun the production of Kaduva and was shot during its break. Abinandhan Ramanujam and Pramod K. Pillai were the cinematographers. Production design was done by Santhosh Raman. Kailas' son Jagan Kailas worked as an associate director on the film. Mohanlal began dubbing for his role in May 2022. In November 2022, Kailas said the film's post-production was in its final stage.

== Music ==
Initially, Jakes Bejoy was attached as the music composer. He was replaced by 4Musics, who composed the film's background score and songs. Originally, the filmmakers had no plans to include any songs until filming was completed. After watching the visuals, 4Musics suggested two songs that would fit the narrative. Kailas wanted more string instruments. 4Musics chose Western style feeling it suits the film's theme, but they could not fully implement it since Kailas had his own views on the kind of music he wanted. For the second track, a rock song was added in the climax portion where the character arc of Kalidas is defined, which serves as the film's theme.

The first single "Life Is A Mystery" was sung by Irish musician Mick Garry who also wrote the lyrics, with additional lyrics added by Biby Mathew and Eldhose Alias; its mixing and mastering was done by Vivek Thomas. The song was recorded in Spain. The Times of India wrote that the song has "a funky style that takes us back to retro American music". It was released on 18 January 2023 by Aashirvad Cinemas label.

No.	Title	Lyrics	Singer	Length
1.	"Life Is A Mystery" (From "Alone")	Mick Garry	Mick Garry	2:08
2.	"He's Moving" (From "Alone")	Biby, Eldhose (4 Musics) & Megha Mary Binu, Rony Philip	Rony Philip	3:36

== Release ==
=== Theatrical ===
In November 2021, it was reported that Alone would be released on a digital streaming platform. In June 2022, Kailas revealed that the film would be released in August 2022 on an OTT platform, which did not happen. Having had a change of plan, in October that year, a teaser was released announcing the film will have a theatrical release. The film received certification from the CBFC in December 2022. In a January 2023 interview, Kailas said Alone was meant to be a direct-to-OTT release. Alone was released in theatres on 26 January 2023.

=== Home media ===
The satellite and digital rights of the film were acquired by Disney+ Hotstar and Asianet. The film started streaming on 3 March 2023 on Disney+ Hotstar.

== Reception ==
Alone received negative reviews upon release.

Janani K. of India Today gave 3 out of 5 and wrote "Director Shaji Kailas’ Alone, starring Mohanlal, is a one-actor film that tries to be a thriller with a twist. But, it neither offers thrills nor the so-called twists have an impact on you." A critic from IndianExpress.com gave 1.5 rating out of 5 and stated, "But sadly, this film doesn't even have a glimpse of the good old vintage Mohanlal or Shaji Kailas." S.R.Praveen of The Hindu wrote, "Mohanlal's solo act not enough to save this stretched-out thriller". Firstpost critic gave 0 out of 5 and noted that "Alone is zero-impact, zero-purpose fare. The point of its existence is a far bigger mystery than the occurrences in the flat where the story unfolds."

== Box office ==
This movie was made with a budget of 3 crore and only managed to collect 1.1 crore worldwide as a final collection and was one of biggest box office failure in Malayalam cinema industry.
