= Kondal =

2024 Indian-Malayalam film

- Directed by: Ajith Mampally
- Written by: Ajith Mampally; Roylin Robert; Satheesh Thonakkal
- Produced by: Sophia Paul
- Starring: Antony Varghese; Raj B. Shetty; Shabeer Kallarakkal
- Cinematography: Deepak D. Menon
- Edited by: Sreejith Sarang
- Music by: Sam C. S
- Production company: Weekend Blockbusters
- Release date: 13 September 2024
- Running time: 147 minutes
- Country: India
- Language: Malayalam

Kondal is a 2024 Indian Malayalam-language action film directed by Ajith Mampally (in his directorial debut) who co-wrote with Roylin Robert and Satheesh Thonakkal and produced by Weekend Blockbusters. The film stars Antony Varghese, alongside Raj B. Shetty, Shabeer Kallarakkal, Prathiba, Gauthami Nair, Jaya Kurup and Nandu. The music was composed by Sam C. S, while the cinematography and editing were handled by Deepak D. Menon and Sreejith Sarang.

Kondal was theatrically released on 13 September 2024, coinciding with Onam weekend, and received mixed reviews from critics.

== Plot ==
Immanuel, affectionately called Manuel by those around him, comes from the seaside village of Anchuthengu located in Thiruvananthapuram. His carefree and reckless way of living mostly centered around drinking, suggests he is grappling with some unseen struggles, all while remaining fiercely devoted to his family. As Manuel faces his own challenges, the village finds itself embroiled in a scandal that threatens its very existence, primarily dependent as it is on fishing for sustenance. The local business, Stephen and Sons, a well-known name in the community, is found to be peddling rotten fish, triggering an uproar among the villagers and tarnishing their reputation. With sales taking a nosedive, the fishermen rally together, demanding that the company take responsibility for its actions in order to salvage their way of life. Yet, the owners, played by Spadikam Sunny and Usha, brush off these pleas and persist in marketing their tainted goods. As frustrations mount, tensions reach a boiling point, culminating in a fierce clash, with Manuel's involvement transforming the situation into a brutal altercation.

Following the police's involvement in the rising tensions, Manuel finds himself compelled to temporarily abandon his village. In search of safety and employment, he signs on with a fishing crew on a vessel leaving from Munambam Harbour in Ernakulam, a location where his deceased brother Danny (Raj B Shetty) used to toil. What should have been a time of peace swiftly morphs into a charged and unfriendly atmosphere. Tensions flare between Manuel and some fellow crew members, especially Jude (Shabeer Kallarakkal) and Michael (Rahul Rajagopal), whose dubious behaviors raise red flags. These clashes uncover disturbing revelations surrounding Danny's enigmatic demise, which Manuel had always assumed was a tragic accident. As Manuel investigates further, he stumbles upon alarming facts that indicate his brother's death was anything but accidental. Fueled by a fierce determination to achieve justice and avenge his sibling, Manuel plunges into a perilous journey to uncover the truth. In the meantime, Jude and the other crew members, aware of the danger Manuel represents, begin to conspire to eliminate him before he can gather more evidence. The narrative then unfolds as Manuel doggedly seeks retribution, setting him on a collision course with those accountable for Danny's fate in a gripping battle for survival and justice.

== Cast ==
- Antony Varghese as Immanuel/Manuel
  - Nebish Benson as Young Immanuel/Manuel
- Raj B. Shetty as Daniel, Manuel's deceased brother
- Shabeer Kallarakkal as Jude
- Prathiba as Manuel's wife
- Gauthami Nair as Daniel's wife
- Jaya Kurup as Manuel and Daniel's mother
- Nandu as Sranku John
- Faizah Mariam as
- Rahul Rajagopal as Michael
- Manikandan R.Aachari as Aloshy
- Sarath Sabha as Pandari
- Siraj
- Usha
- Pramod Velliyanad as Sabu

== Soundtrack ==
Kondal

Soundtrack album by Sam C. S.
- Released: 5 September 2024
- Genre: Feature film soundtrack
- Length: 12:57
- Language: Malayalam
- Label: Saregama

Track listing

No.	Title	Lyrics	Music	Singer(s)	Length
1.	"Choolamadikkada"	Vinayak Sasikumar	Sam C. S.	Pranavam Sasi, Guru, Gireesh	3:35
2.	"Kondal"	Vedan	Sam C. S.	Vedan	4:22
3.	"Aradi Nee"	Vinayak Sasikumar	Sam C. S.	Sam C. S.	5:00
Total length:					12:57

== Release ==
Kondal was theatrically released on 13 September 2024. The film was premiered on Netflix from 13 October 2024.

== Reception ==
The movie had similar resemblances with Adithattu

Rohit panikker of Times Now News gave 3/5 stars and wrote "Fun Theatrical Watch Mainly For Its High Energy Action Sequences".

Swathi P Ajith of Onmanorama wrote "Antony Varghese starrer 'Kondal' delivers high-octane stunts in a sea-bound thriller".

Anandu Suresh of The Indian Express rated the film 2 out of 5 stars and reviewed "Antony Varghese Pepe's actioner is ruined by aimless writing".

== Box Office ==
Despite an initial strong opening of Rs 55 lakhs, the film's earnings have steadily declined. Directed by Ajith Mampally and featuring Kannada actor Raj B Shetty, 'Kondal' is set in a coastal village but has received mediocre reviews from audiences.
