= Brother's Day =

2019 film directed by Kalabhavan Shajon

- Theatrical release poster
- Directed by: Kalabhavan Shajohn
- Written by: Kalabhavan Shajohn
- Produced by: Listin Stephen
- Starring: Prithviraj Sukumaran; Prasanna; Aishwarya Lekshmi
- Cinematography: Jithu Damodar
- Edited by: Akhilesh Mohan
- Music by: 4 Musics
- Production company: Magic Frames
- Distributed by: Magic Frames Release
- Release date: September 6, 2019 (India)
- Running time: 164 minutes
- Country: India
- Language: Malayalam

Brother's Day is a 2019 Indian Malayalam-language action thriller film written and directed by Kalabhavan Shajohn (in his directorial debut) Produced by Listin Stephen, the film stars Prithviraj Sukumaran, Prasanna and Aishwarya Lekshmi. The film marks the debut of Prasanna as actor and Dhanush as singer and lyricist in Malayalam cinema. Music for the film was composed by 4 Musics. Principal photography began on 16 March 2019 and was completed in mid-July after a 96-day long filming. The film was released in theatres worldwide on 6 September 2019.

== Plot ==
The movie opens with a flashback, introducing a young boy named Shiva. He is well-liked by the children in his village, exuding positivity despite his difficult home life. His father, a bitter alcoholic, abuses Shiva and harbors doubts about his paternity, blaming his wife for infidelity. Tragedy strikes when Shiva's mother dies giving birth to a baby girl, whom Shiva names Peeli. From then on, Shiva takes on the responsibility of raising his little sister, forming a close and heartwarming bond with her. As Shiva and Peeli grow up, their relationship deepens, but their father's cruelty does not subside. One day, when Shiva returns home, he discovers his father's friend attempting to molest Peeli, with his father's consent. Enraged, Shiva kills both men and flees the house with Peeli. However, due to the shock and trauma, Peeli is unresponsive, and in a desperate moment, Shiva abandons her and escapes alone.

Years later, the story shifts to the present, where we meet Rony, a caterer and part-time driver living a content life with his mother and sister, Ruby. They are a close-knit family, and Ruby is in love with Rony's best friend. Although Rony initially disapproves of the relationship, he eventually agrees, and Ruby marries her love, leading to a happy family life.

Rony's life changes when he meets Jema, the daughter of his wealthy boss, at a wedding where he's working. They form a connection, and romance blossoms between them. Around the same time, Rony is asked to pick up a tourist named Chandy. However, the man he picks up turns out to be a drunk impostor, leading to a series of amusing events. Despite the mix-up, Rony decides to help the man, forging an unexpected friendship with Chandy, who turns out to be a successful businessman.

As Rony and Jema grow closer, Rony opens up about a tragic event in his past: while on her honeymoon, his sister Ruby and her husband were attacked in a jungle notorious for wild animals. Ruby survived but was left bedridden, while her husband died in the attack. Ruby's condition now requires constant care, which Rony lovingly provides.

Later, it's revealed that Chandy has a daughter, Santa, a sweet and lively young woman who quickly becomes friends with Rony. However, when Santa meets Ruby, both women are struck and Santa breaks into tears. Santa reveals to Rony that she is actually Peeli and was adopted by Chandy from an orphanage. Santa, now living a new life, recently reconnected with her brother Shiva who left her as a child. Santa also reveals to Rony that after Shiva returned to her life, he began blackmailing her. She had let him into her home, thinking he had changed, but soon realized he was a violent criminal, responsible for her sister-in-law Ruby's horrific attack. Shiva is not the caring brother she remembers but a heartless manipulator who exploits her for money, even murdering people who stand in his way.

Rony, determined to protect Santa, confronts Chandy, who had been unaware of Shiva's true nature. With the help of a nun who oversaw Santa's adoption, they discover that the real Shiva died years ago in an accident. The man posing as Shiva is an imposter who has infiltrated Santa's life for his own gain.

In a tense climax, Rony and Chandy rush to save Santa, who is being held captive by the fake Shiva in a jungle hideout. After a thrilling chase and a brutal fight, Rony manages to defeat Shiva and escape with Santa. Just as Shiva prepares to strike again, Chandy intervenes, hitting him with his car, seemingly ending his reign of terror. The film concludes with Rony, Jema, and Ruby recovering from the ordeal. Ruby, having found peace after hearing the news of Shiva's death, watches a TV report that states he was killed by a wild animal, closing the case. However, in a flashback, it's revealed that Rony had actually killed Shiva with a rod and staged the scene to make it look like an animal attack. The investigating officer, aware of the truth, decides to let it go, referring to Rony as the “tiger” who brought justice to the criminal world.

In the end, Rony, Jema, and Ruby embark on a long drive, finally free from their past burdens, feeling hopeful for the future.

== Cast ==
- Prithviraj Sukumaran as Rony David
- Prasanna as Fake Shiva
  - Rahul Radhakrishnan as Real Shiva
- Aishwarya Lekshmi as Santa / Peeli
  - Baby Kezia as young Peeli
- Madonna Sebastian as Jema George
- Prayaga Martin as Ruby
- Miya George as Thaneesha
- Vijayaraghavan as Kurishinkal Chandy
- Dharmajan Bolgatty as Munna / Valsan
- Kottayam Nazeer as Joy
- Vijayakumar as CI Alex Kurian
- Spadikam George as George Thomas
- Ponnamma Babu as Susanna George
- Shivaji Guruvayoor as Basheer Mohammed
- Anil Murali as Kanaran, a politician
- Prem Prakash as Michael
- Pauly Valsan as Valyammachi
- Kochu Preman as a priest
- Vanitha Krishnachandran as a Nun
- Maala Parvathi as Nazriya, Basheer's wife
- Dinesh Panicker as Davis
- Naseer Sankranthi as Police Constable
- Resmi Anil as a Nun
- Anjana Appukuttan as servant
- Vinod Kedamangalam as marriage broker
- Mime Gopi as Peeli's father
- Jayasankar Karimuttam as Peeli's father's friend
- Kalabhavan Shajon as a Police Officer (cameo appearance)

== Production ==
Brother's Day marks the directorial and screenwriter debut of actor Kalabhavan Shajohn. It was at the sets of Oozham (2016) that Shajohn narrated the screenplay to Prithviraj. Shajohn had no plans of directing the film at that time. He asked Prithviraj to recommend anyone and Prithviraj encouraged Shajohn to direct the film himself and agreed to act provided that he direct. Produced by Listin Stephen, the film was made on a budget of ₹6 crore. Shajohn describes the film as a "family thriller".Miya, Aishwarya Lekshmi, Madonna Sebastian and Prayaga Martin plays the four female lead roles. The film marks the Malayalam film debut of actor Prasanna. Principal photography began on 16 March 2019. After a 96-day long shoot the film was wrapped in mid-July 2019. The film was shot in locations such as Pollachi, Kuttikkanam, Ernakulam, and Munnar.

== Soundtrack ==
Brother's Day

Soundtrack album by 4 Musics, Nadirshah
- Recorded: 5 August 2019
- Venues: Kochi, Chennai
- Studios: NHQ Studio; Studio 6/8; My Studio; Wunderbar Studios
- Genre: Feature film soundtrack
- Languages: Malayalam, Tamil
- Label: Magic Frames

The music for the film was composed by the ensemble group 4 Music and Nadirshah. Dhanush penned and sung the Tamil song "Nenjodu Vinaa", marking his singing debut in Malayalam films. Madhu Vasudevan, B. K. Harinarayanan, Jis Joy, Nellai Jayantha were the other lyricists.

Brother's Day (Original Motion Picture Soundtrack)
No.	Title	Lyrics	Music	Singer(s)	Length
1.	"Nenjodu Vinaa"	Dhanush, Biby Mathew	4 Music	Dhanush	3:00
2.	"Chellam Chellam"	B. K. Harinarayanan	4 Music	Abhijith Kollam	4:38
3.	"Thalolam Thumbippennalle"	Madhu Vasudevan	4 Music	Vijay Yesudas, Zia Ul Haq, Biby Mathew, Haritha Balakrishnan, Vrinda Shameek Ghosh, Judith Ann
4.	"Oru Thooval"				3:15

== Release ==
Brother's Day was released in theatres worldwide on 6 September 2019, ahead of the Onam week in Kerala.
