= Rudhiram =

2024 Indian Malayalam-language film

- Directed by: Jisho Lon Antony
- Screenplay by: Jisho Lon Antony; Joseph Kiran George
- Story by: Jisho Lon Antony
- Produced by: V.S. Lalan
- Starring: Raj B. Shetty; Aparna Balamurali
- Cinematography: Sajad Kakku
- Edited by: Bavan Sreekumar
- Music by: 4 Musics
- Production company: Rising Sun Studios
- Distributed by: Sree Gokulam Movies
- Release date: 13 December 2024
- Country: India
- Language: Malayalam

Rudhiram is a 2024 Indian Malayalam-language psychological thriller, which marks the directorial debut of Jisho Lon Antony. The film features Raj B. Shetty and Aparna Balamurali and was released to mixed reviews.

== Cast ==
- Raj B. Shetty as Dr Mathew Rosy
- Aparna Balamurali as Swathy
- Priya Sreejith as Dr Fousiya
- Hari R Menon as Alan

== Production ==
This movie pooja and switch on ceremony was held at Thrissur, Sree Gokulam Residency. Principal photography began on 15 February 2023 near Chimmini Dam in Thrissur.

This movie music and background score by 4 Musics.
