= Pedro (2021 film) =

Indian film

- Promotional poster
- Directed by: Natesh Hegde
- Written by: Natesh Hegde
- Produced by: Rishab Shetty
- Starring: Gopal Hegde
- Cinematography: Vikas Urs
- Edited by: Paresh Kamdar; Natesh Hegde
- Production company: Rishab Shetty Films
- Release date: 9 October 2021 (Busan International Film Festival)
- Running time: 108 minutes
- Country: India
- Language: Kannada

Pedro is a 2021 Indian Kannada-language film directed by Natesh Hegde and starring Gopal Hegde in the titular role. The film was released in film festivals.

== Cast ==
- Gopal Hegde as Pedro
- Ramakrishna Bhat Dundi as the village leader
- Raj B. Shetty as a vigilante
- Medini Kelmane as Julie
- Nagaraj Hegde as Bastyava
- Charan Naik as Vinnu

== Reception ==
A critic from Screen Daily wrote that "Deliberately paced but hardly sedate, Pedro is a confident feature debut, with Hegde’s decision to forgo score in favour of Shreyank Nanjappa’s subtly enveloping sound design making its regional portrait particularly immersive". A critic from NDTV rated the film four out of five stars and wrote that "Taken in its entirety, Pedro is a quietly searing portrait of isolation, insularity and intolerance couched in the colours of a lush landscape". A critic from Deccan Herald wrote that "Be it life or art, things left unsaid are the most powerful. When a tragedy is left to the imagination of the audience, it keeps haunting them for a long time. This is exactly what Natesh Hegde’s award-winning movie Pedro achieves, with its fine story-telling".
