= 777 Charlie =

- Theatrical release poster
- Directed by: Kiranraj K.
- Written by: Kiranraj K.
- Produced by: G. S. Gupta; Rakshit Shetty; Binay Khandelwal; Sudhee D S (Executive Producers)
- Dialogue by: Kiranraj K. Raj B. Shetty; Abhijit Mahesh
- Starring: Charlie; Rakshit Shetty; Sangeetha Sringeri; Raj B. Shetty; Danish Sait; Bobby Simha
- Cinematography: Arvind S. Kashyap
- Edited by: Pratheek Shetty
- Music by: Nobin Paul
- Production company: Paramvah Studios
- Release date: 10 June 2022
- Running time: 164 minutes
- Country: India
- Language: Kannada
- Budget: ₹20 crore
- Box office: ₹105—115 crore

777 Charlie is a 2022 Indian Kannada-language adventure drama film written and directed by Kiranraj K. and produced by Paramvah Studios. It stars Charlie, a Labrador dog in the title role, and Rakshit Shetty alongside Sangeetha Sringeri, Raj B. Shetty, Danish Sait, Bobby Simha and Aniruddh Roy. The film follows the journey and bonding between a lonely factory worker and a stray Labrador dog.

777 Charlie was announced in September 2017. Principal photography took place from June 2018 to October 2021, with delays due to COVID-19 pandemic. The film was shot in various locations across Maharashtra, Karnataka, Goa, Gujarat, Rajasthan, Punjab, Himachal Pradesh and Kashmir. 777 Charlie had a limited theatrical release on 2 June 2022, and released in cinemas worldwide on 10 June 2022. The film received critical acclaim for its cast performances (particularly Rakshit Shetty and Charlie), writing, emotional weight and direction.

With theatrical earnings of over ₹105 crore (US$11 million) globally, 777 Charlie became the fifth highest-grossing Kannada film at the time of release. Among all the Kannada films released in June over the years, 777 Charlie is the highest-grossing and ranks among the top films in terms of opening week earnings. At the 69th National Film Awards, the film won the award for Best Feature Film In Kannada and four Karnataka State Film Awards for Second Best Film, Best Actor, Best Editing and Best Lyricist.

== Plot ==
A young Labrador Retriever puppy escapes from a cruel commercial breeding facility where animals are severely mistreated and kept in cages. After a long journey, the puppy arrives in the Chinmaya colony of Mysore, the residence of a reclusive factory worker named Dharma. Traumatized by a past car accident where a dog's sudden appearance caused the deaths of his parents and sister, Dharma lives an isolated, aggressive, and monotonous life characterized by heavy drinking, smoking, and an obsession with Charlie Chaplin films.

The puppy's life intersects with Dharma's when a loud neighborhood musical festival terrifies the animal. Awakened and enraged by the noise, Dharma smashes the band's instruments. Viewing Dharma as a protector, the puppy begins covertly following him, scavenging his discarded food and sheltering in his outdoor trash bin. When the puppy is struck by a vehicle while trailing him, a reluctant Dharma is moved to pity after recalling a similar bond depicted in a Charlie Chaplin film. He takes the injured animal to a veterinary clinic, where Dr. Ashwin Kumar treats her and advises Dharma to foster the puppy temporarily until an adopter is found.

Despite strict neighborhood regulations against pets, Dharma agrees and applies for a dog license. As they spend time together alongside a neighborhood child named Adrika ("Adi"), Dharma undergoes a profound emotional transformation, shedding his aggressive demeanor and naming the dog Charlie. This domestic happiness is shattered when Charlie suddenly collapses. A medical examination reveals that she is suffering from terminal hemangiosarcoma of the spleen, a aggressive form of cancer brought on by the severe physical abuse and reckless overbreeding she endured at the puppy mill.

Devastated by the diagnosis, Dharma resolves to give Charlie a memorable final chapter. Noticing her intense excitement whenever snow appears on television, he packs his belongings and embarks on a road trip towards the snowy landscapes of Himachal Pradesh. Their journey draws the suspicion of an animal rights activist named Devika, who mistakenly believes Dharma is exploiting the dog and follows them to gather evidence. En route, Dharma receives confirmation of Charlie's origins from her original veterinarian, alongside video footage documenting her past abuse under her birth name, Keaton. Dharma validates the history when Charlie reacts with visible terror to her old name. Enraged, Dharma tracks down the breeding facility, assaults the abusive breeder, and alerts the authorities, resulting in the man's arrest and the rescue of the remaining caged animals.

Learning the truth of the situation, a remorseful Devika apologizes to Dharma and offers her full support before departing for her professional commitments. She connects Dharma with Karshan Roy, a journalist who promises to document their journey. Traveling through Punjab, Dharma and Charlie are hosted by Vamshinathan, a fellow canine enthusiast, and his dog, Blacky. Vamshi provides Dharma with a pass to a regional dog sports competition. Though initially attending as spectators, Charlie's incredible athletic agility leads them to enter the contest, winning the tournament and capturing the hearts of the audience.

As Charlie's health rapidly deteriorates, a penniless Dharma sells his motorcycle to finance the remainder of their journey on foot. They find temporary shelter at a Buddhist monastery, where a monk informs Dharma that Charlie was pregnant with Blacky's offspring, though the litter tragically did not survive the toll of her illness. Continuing northward, their bus is halted by a military checkpoint due to a catastrophic landslide. Moved by Dharma's desperate pleas, a sympathetic army officer grants them transport into Kashmir.

Deep within the mountains, Dharma and Charlie finally step onto the snowfields, playing together joyfully. The following morning, Charlie quietly slips away into the freezing wilderness. After a frantic search, Dharma discovers her resting at a remote temple. Charlie climbs into his lap, offers a final gesture of gratitude, and peacefully passes away in his arms. As a heartbroken Dharma mourns her, he hears a soft whimper from within the temple altar and discovers a single surviving newborn puppy, realizing that Charlie had covertly given birth to Blacky's daughter to ensure Dharma would never be alone again.

Months later, Dharma, alongside Devika, Adrika, and his reformed neighbors, inaugurates a state-of-the-art animal rescue and rehabilitation shelter dedicated to Charlie's memory. Sitting beside her memorial, Dharma reads Karshan's published feature article detailing their profound journey, while Charlie's surviving daughter, also named Charlie, playfully runs around the sanctuary grounds.

== Cast ==
- Charlie as Charlie / Keaton, a Labrador Retriever dog
- Rakshit Shetty as Dharma alias Dharmaraj Dattana
- Sangeetha Sringeri as Devika Aradhya
- Raj B. Shetty as Dr. Ashwin Kumar
- Danish Sait as Karshan Roy
- Sharvari as Adhrika
- Bobby Simha as Vamshinandhan, a Tamil dog lover
- H. G. Somashekar Rao as tea stall owner
- Bhargavi Narayan as tea stall owner's wife
- Gopalkrishna Deshpande as Kripakar, Dharma's colleague
- Dinesh Mangaluru as SI Ranjan Shetty
- Abhijith Mahesh as compounder
- Anirudh Mahesh as Uttam, Dharma's colleague
- Vijay Vikram Singh as military officer
- Bengaluru Nagesh as Dharma's neighbour
- Salman Ahmed as Manju
- Harini as Dharma's mother
- Siddharth Bhat as Dharma's father
- Praanya P. Rao as Dharma's sister
- Dhanraj Shivakumar as Vicky
- Kiranraj K. as North Indian hotel owner (cameo appearance)
- Monita Bala as Dog Show Host
- Aniruddh Roy as Gautham, Dog Show Host

== Production ==
=== Development ===
In September 2017, Rakshit Shetty announced his next film under the production banner Paramvah Studios titled as 777 Charlie. Kiranraj K., who had assisted Rishab Shetty in Ricky and Kirik Party, was brought on board for the project, which marked his directorial debut. Shetty agreed to produce the film as the script was considered to be "first-of-its-kind" in Kannada cinema. Kiranraj also revealed that some sequences in the film were inspired from his real-life incidents. Before the film's production in June 2018, dog trainer BC Pramod trained three Labrador Retrievers to play the role of Charlie in the film for three weeks, as the bonding between the dog and the lead actor was to be real and convincing.

=== Casting ===
The makers initially considered Aravinnd Iyer as the lead actor, whom Shetty had recommended after working with him in Kirik Party. Shetty stated that "The character in the film works in a vehicle manufacturing factory and wears a rugged look, and even the neighbourhood children are scared of him. The role perfectly suited Aravinnd and he came on board". But, as the production delayed, Iyer left the project in February 2018 as his schedule clashed with that of Bheemasena Nalamaharaja (2020). Subsequently, Shetty replaced him in the lead role.

In May 2018, Pushkara Mallikarjunaiah announced a casting call for the film's female lead, in which Sangeetha Sringeri was selected as the female lead from the audition with over 2,700 entries. Raj B. Shetty joined the cast in July 2018, where he played the role of a veterinary doctor. Danish Sait joined the shoot in the first schedule. Child artists Sharvari and Praanya P Rao, appeared in a part of the film. In November 2020, it was announced that Tamil actor Bobby Simha would appear in a cameo role, marking his debut in the Kannada film industry.

=== Filming ===
The film's principal photography began in Mangalore on 8 June 2018, with Shetty joining the shoot after simultaneously working on the production of Avane Srimannarayana (2020). Kiranraj chose to shoot the first schedule in Mangalore as the opening sequences since "Charlie (the protagonist), who escapes from one place to another, finds himself in a fish market. As the scene needed an exclusive fish selling zone, which is not available anywhere in the state, which is why we chose Mangalore." The team shot a few sequences at Sakleshpur and then moved to Mysore and Bangalore, where Shetty joined the shooting schedule. In September 2018, it was revealed that portions with young Charlie had been completed, and the team needed to take a break, since Shetty planned to resume shooting for Avane Srimannarayana. The film has music by Nobin Paul, cinematography by Aravind Kashyap, and editing by Pratheek Shetty.

In March 2018, the team resumed the shooting in Mysore with scenes featuring the protagonist in his old-house as Mysore had old buildings, which suited the script. The team planned a 30-day schedule in the location and Shetty simultaneously worked on the film along with Avane Srimannarayana as he planned to release the two films within that year. Later, the team shot a few sequences in the Dandeli forest. Soon after the release of Avane Srimannarayana, Shetty rejoined the production team in late-January 2020 to shoot major sequences in North India. A montage song showcasing the bond between Charlie and Shetty was filmed in Goa. The makers also filmed a few portions in Goa, Maharashtra, Gujarat, Rajasthan and Punjab. 777 Charlie completed 100 days of filming in March 2020, before the COVID-19 pandemic brought the production to a halt.

Filming resumed in October 2020 after a six-month break with sequences being shot in Bangalore and Kodaikanal. Later, the team went on a location scouting in Himachal Pradesh and Kashmir to shoot more sequences, which began on 20 November 2020. Shetty joined the Kashmir schedule during the first week of December. However, due to the unpleasant weather, the team delayed the production, until filming resumed in January 2021. The film's schedule in Kashmir was completed on 27 January 2021. In June 2021, director Kiranraj stated that the team had filmed for a total of 160 days, with visuals for end credits pending to be shot. After 164 days of filming, including shooting for the patchwork scenes, the makers wrapped up the shoot on 25 October 2021.

=== Post-production ===
The post-production simultaneously began on 29 January 2021, when the team had completed 90% of the film's production. It was reported that Nobin Paul had started working on the film's background score during the COVID-19 pandemic lockdown in August 2020. Rakshit Shetty began dubbing for the portions during March 2021, and the production team announced that 70% of the dubbing work had been completed. Since the film was to have a pan-India release, director Kiranraj and his team chose more than 200 voice artists to dub for the 50+ characters in five languages. He made sure that "the film never feels like a 'dubbed' film in other languages but instead the authenticity and local flavor is maintained in each version". After the completion of the filming, Kiranraj announced a December 2021 theatrical release.

== Music ==
The score and soundtrack of 777 Charlie is composed and produced by Nobin Paul.

== Release ==
=== Theatrical ===
777 Charlie had a limited theatrical release on 2 June 2022 with special preview screenings across 21 Indian cities starting with Delhi and Amritsar, and later moving to Jaipur, Mumbai, Kochi, Chennai, Pune on 6 June and Hyderabad, Ahmedabad, Nagpur, Solapur, Thiruvananthapuram, Varanasi, and Coimbatore on 7 June. The film was released worldwide in cinemas on 10 June 2022.

Earlier in May 2021, director Kiranraj announced in an interview that 777 Charlie will have a theatrical release during the fourth quarter of that year. He said that "considering the budget, scale and the pan-Indian approach, one cannot assure the film being streamed in an over-the-top media service. The making of the film has been very taxing deal on us, sure, but the whole team wishes that the audience gets to see the film on the big screen. We have our hopes pinned on the vaccination drive and the government's approach in controlling the pandemic, thus the audience will be receptive to watching films in the theatres." The film also released in Hindi, Telugu, Tamil, and Malayalam languages.

The team planned to release the film on the last week of December, as the producers had a sentiment with Shetty's last two successful releases Kirik Party and Avane Srimmannarayana had released on the last week of December. In September 2021, the makers announced that 777 Charlie would be released theatrically on 31 December 2021, coinciding the New Year's Eve. A few weeks before the scheduled release, the producers announced that the premiere would be postponed. Apart from being considered for a dubbed version in Russian, it was reported to be one of the 39 movies considered by China to dub in their language. Two years after the initial release, the movie is set to be dubbed and released in Japanese on 28 June 2024 across Japan by Shochiku studios. Further the director also confirmed that the dubbing rights have been sold to few production houses in Russia, Taiwan, Latin America, Italy and Germany.

=== Distribution ===
In June 2021, Prithviraj Sukumaran who watched few scenes from the preview of this film, had agreed to acquire the rights under the Prithviraj Productions banner for the film's Malayalam-dubbed version. The same month, Karthik Subbaraj's Stone Bench Films acquired the distribution rights for the Tamil-dubbed version. Later the Telugu dubbed version was released by Nani under his production house Wall Poster Cinema.

=== Home media ===
The film was digitally streamed on Voot Select on 29 July 2022. Amazon Prime announced that the film was available for rentals, for ₹199, to both prime and non-prime customers in India, from 30 September 2022 in Hindi, Tamil, Telugu, and Malayalam. The Hindi version of the movie moved to free streaming from 19 April 2024.

== Reception ==
=== Critical reception ===
On the review aggregator website Rotten Tomatoes, 100% of 5 critics' reviews are positive, with an average rating of 6.5/10.

Grace Cyril of India Today rated the film 4 out of 5 stars and wrote "777 Charlie is filled with emotional, fun and aww-worthy moments". Tini Sara Anien of Deccan Herald rated the film 4 out of 5 stars and wrote "777 Charlie' is a family film with a difference and let's hope the film inspires a healthy trend in Kannada cinema". A critic for Sakshi Post rated the film 4 out of 5 stars and wrote "Rakshit Shetty's 777 Charlie is an emotional rollercoaster ride".

Archika Khurana of The Times of India rated the film 3.5 out of 5 stars and wrote "'777 Charlie' is a treat for fans of both Rakshit Shetty and films that convey essential messages, such as pet adoption in this case. There is a lot of heart and soul in the movie, with moments that will leave you with teary eyes at the end". Shubham Kulkarni of Koimoi rated the film 3.5 out of 5 stars and wrote "777 Charlie is a film made for you to suspend your disbelief and watch with all your hearts laugh, cry". Latha Srinivasan of Firstpost rated the film 3.5 stars out of 5 stars and wrote "Kiranraj K's 777 Charlie makes you feel emotions you haven't felt in a while and honestly it's a good feeling".

Soundarya Athimuthu of The Quint wrote "Even if you are not a pet lover, 777 Charlie will turn you into one". A Sharadhaa of The New Indian Express rated the film 3.5 out of 5 stars and wrote "777 Charlie is definitely an ode to dog lovers and Kiranraj, Rakshit and Co have crafted it in such a way that even if you are not one, watching this film just might make you revisit that stance".

Nandini Ramnath of Scroll.in rated wrote "Dharma's road trip with Charlie seemingly has a destination, but the film takes forever to get there". Manoj Kumar R of The Indian Express rated the film 3 out of 5 stars and wrote "Amid larger-than-life, violence-prone cinema we have watched this year, this Rakshit Shetty-starrer offers a quieter experience of self-reflection about the absurdity of life".

=== Box office ===
The box office collections of the movie was reported by various sources with varying degrees of accuracy. While the movie collected ₹1.10 crore from previews on Thursday, the first day collection was around ₹4.9 crores to ₹6.27 crores(net). The second day collection was reported to be around ₹6.25 crores to ₹7.87 crores (net). Multiple sources reported the third day collection to be around ₹7.5 crores to ₹9.5 crores to ₹10.01 crore(net) taking the first weekend collections to ₹19.75 crores to ₹20 crores to ₹ 23.5 crores to ₹24.15 crores (net) to ₹27 crores.

The five day collections were reported to be around ₹32.7 crores to ₹35 crores. It was reported to have collected over ₹2.1 crores in Kerala in 6 days making it the third highest grossing Kannada film there. While the six day collections stood at ₹35.7 crores, the first week collections were reported to be around ₹38.65 crores to ₹38.9 crores to ₹47.25 crores. The movie was reported to have grossed ₹50.1 crores in 8 eight days of which ₹36 crores was from Karnataka; ₹2 crores from Andhra Pradesh & Telangana; ₹2.25 crores from Kerala; ₹1 crore from Tamil Nadu; ₹2 crores from rest of India and ₹6.85 crores from overseas.

By the end of 10 days, the movie had collected around ₹50.75 crores to ₹53.1 crores. While the movie collected ₹1.5 crores within 5 days in Kerala, it went on to surpass the ₹3 crore mark within 12 days there. The gross collections of the movie was reported to be around ₹75 crores in 12 days and ₹90 crores in 17 days. The movie minted over ₹4.05 crores in Kerala within 17 days and went on to collect ₹4.5 crores in 24 days there and was reported to be heading towards ₹5 crore mark in Kerala. The movie was reported to have collected ₹95 crores in 22 days.

On the occasion of 25 day success meet, Rakshit Shetty revealed the total gross revenue of the movie - from all the sources (such as theatre, digital, satellite, music and remake rights) to be ₹150 crores out of which ₹100 crores was reported to be the theatrical collections. At the end of 30 days, it was reported to have collected ₹4 crores each from both Telugu and Tamil versions and ₹5.5 crores from the Malayalam version. The Hindi version was reported to have collected ₹7 crores. While The Times of India reported that the film collected ₹100 crores, Odisha TV reported the worldwide collection at the end of 60 days to be around ₹105.72 crore. The closing collections were estimated to be around ₹105 crores to ₹115 crores.

== Accolades ==
Year	Award	Category	Recipient	Result	Ref.
2021	National Film Awards	Best Feature Film in Kannada	G. S. Gupta, Rakshit Shetty, Kiranraj K.	Won	
2021	Karnataka State Film Awards	Second Best Film	G. S. Gupta, Rakshit Shetty, Kiranraj K.	Won	
2021	Karnataka State Film Awards	Best Actor	Rakshit Shetty	Won	
2021	Karnataka State Film Awards	Best Editor	Pratheek Shetty	Won	
2021	Karnataka State Film Awards	Best Lyricist	Nagarjun Sharma (for The Hymn of Dharma)	Won	
2023	South Indian International Movie Awards	Best Film – Kannada	Paramvah Studios	Won	
2023	South Indian International Movie Awards	Best Director – Kannada	Kiranraj K.	Nominated	
2023	South Indian International Movie Awards	Best Actor – Kannada	Rakshit Shetty	Nominated	
2023	South Indian International Movie Awards	Special Appreciation (Best Actor – Kannada)	Rakshit Shetty	Won	
2023	South Indian International Movie Awards	Best Supporting Actor – Kannada	Raj B. Shetty	Nominated	
2023	South Indian International Movie Awards	Best Music Director – Kannada	Nobin Paul	Nominated	

== Legacy ==
The demand for Labradors was reported to have increased after the release of the film. However, experts and activists were of the view that pets should not be brought home on the basis of short-term plan based on temporary flow of emotions since it would lead to sudden spike in their demand leading to unethical breeding, which was spoken against in the movie. A sniffer dog inducted into the Mangalore police department was named Charlie.
