= Kiranraj K. =

Indian filmmaker (born 1989)

- Born: August 25, 1986 (age 40); Kumbadaje, India
- Education: ALPS Marikkana Pavoor; J.A.S.B.S. School Manya; Sri Annapoorneshwari High School, Agalpady; Matha Education Mangalore
- Occupation: Filmmaker
- Years active: 2011–present
- Notable work: 777 Charlie

Kiranraj K. (born August 25, 1989) is an Indian filmmaker who works in the Kannada film industry. He is known for directing 777 Charlie.

== Early life ==
Kiranraj was born on August 25, 1989, in a small village near Kumbadaje. His father, Achutha K., and mother, Godavari, were both farmers. He specialised in Film Direction from Star Creators Film Institute in Bengaluru.

== Career ==
Kiranraj has directed multiple short films, documentaries and music videos. He made a telefilm called Kaavala. Later he made a short film called Kabbina Halu which was based on a real life incident and won the Vibha South Indian Short film Award in 2013.

Kiranraj was Associate Director for Endendigu, Kirik Party, and Ricky, all of which were directed by Rakshit Shetty. He is also a part of "The Seven Odds" (a team of seven writers) for Kirik Party. He gained popularity after directing 777 Charlie.

== Accolades ==
Year	Award	Category	Film	Result	Notes	Ref.
2013	Vibha South Indian Short Film Festival	Best Film	Kabbina Haalu	Won		
2022	National Film Awards	Best Feature Film in Kannada	777 Charlie	Won	Along with G. S. Gupta and Rakshit Shetty	
2023	South Indian International Movie Awards (SIIMA)	Best Director — Kannada	777 Charlie	Won		

== Filmography ==
Year	Film	Direction	Writer	Notes	Ref.
2016	Kirik Party	No	Yes	One of the "The Seven Odds"	
2019	Katha Sangama (Sagara Sangamam)	Yes	Yes	Directed 16 minutes	
2022	777 Charlie	Yes	Yes		

=== As actor ===
Year	Film	Role	Notes	Ref.
2011	Kaavala	Santhosh	Short Film	
2016	Ricky	Radhakrishnan’s friend		
2022	777 Charlie	North Indian Hotel Owner	cameo	
2024	Ibbani Tabbida Ileyali		Guest Appearance	
