= Suhan Prasad =

Indian film producer and director

- Kannada: ಸುಹಾನ್ ಪ್ರಸಾದ್
- Born: Mangaluru, Karnataka, India
- Education: St Aloysious College, Mangaluru
- Occupations: Director & Producer

Suhan Prasad is a film Director and film producer in the Kannada film industry and Tulu film industry . He is well known for the films Ondu Motteya Kathe, his directorial debut Rang in Tulu film industry.

== Filmography ==
=== As director ===
Suhan made his debut being the assistant director of Chella Pilli in 2013 starring Vijay Raghavendra. He then moved to Tulu Cinema with his directorial debut Rang which made huge success in the coastal Karnataka.

- Chella Pilli (2013) (assistant director)
- Rang (2014) (directorial debut)

=== As producer ===
Suhan vision of producing movies started with his venture Mango Pickle Entertainment. Their debut movie, Ondu Motteya Kathe (2017) saw success across the state. It also won the Best Film Award at Filmfare Awards (South).

- Ondu Motteya Kathe (2017)
