= Ondu Motteya Kathe =

2017 Kannada film directed by Raj B. Shetty

- Film poster
- Directed by: Raj B. Shetty
- Written by: Raj B. Shetty
- Produced by: Suhan Prasad; Pawan Kumar
- Starring: Raj B. Shetty; Usha Bhandary; Amrutha Naik; Deepak Rai Panaje
- Cinematography: Praveen Shriyan
- Edited by: Praveen Shriyan
- Music by: Midhun Mukundan
- Production companies: Pawan Kumar Studios; Mango Pickle Entertainment
- Release date: 7 July 2017
- Country: India
- Language: Kannada
- Budget: ₹30 lakhs
- Box office: ₹ 2.5 crores

Ondu Motteya Kathe (transl. Story of an egg (a bald person)) is a 2017 Kannada-language romantic comedy film written and directed by debutant Raj B. Shetty who also appears in the lead role, along with Usha Bhandary, Shailashree, Prakash Tuminadu, Amrutha Naik, Shreya Anchan, Deepak Rai Panaje, Mime Ramdas, VJ Vineeth, and Rahul Amin playing supporting roles. The movie was released on 7 July 2017 to positive reviews. The Hindu called it the "Kannada film of the year". The film won the Filmfare Award for Best Film – Kannada. The film had an estimated budget of ₹3 million and became a commercial success, earning ₹25 million at the box office.

In 2019, the film was remade in Malayalam as Thamaasha and in Hindi as Ujda Chaman.

== Plot ==
A bald Kannada teacher, Janardhana, finds his love blossoming with the stout Sarala whom he met through a flopped pre-arranged marriage function.

== Cast ==
- Raj B. Shetty as Janardhana
- Usha Bhandary as Janardhana's mother
- Shailashree as Sarala
- Amrutha Naik as E-Madam
- Shreya Anchan as Moha, marketing girl
- Deepak Rai Panaje as Guruji
- Mime Ramdas as Principal
- VJ Vineeth as Janardhana's Brother
- Prakash Thuminad as Srinivas
- Shine Shetty as English lecturer
- Rahul Amin as Sarala's boyfriend

== Production ==
The film was initially conceived as a short film, but Raj's friend and producer Suhan Prasad encouraged that he make a feature-length film.

== Soundtrack ==
Ondu Motteya Kathe

Soundtrack album by Midhun Mukundan
- Released: 1 May 2017
- Recorded: 2017
- Studios: Pranava Studios, Aum Studios, Lagori Studios
- Genre: Feature film soundtrack
- Length: 17:28
- Label: Anand Audio
- Producer: Midhun Mukundan
External audio
- Audio Jukebox on YouTube

The soundtrack of the film was composed by Midhun Mukundan and lyrics by Vishwajitj Rao, Raj B Shetty and Keerthan Bhandary.

Track listing
No.	Title	Lyrics	Singer(s)	Length
1.	"Chanda Avala"	Vishwajith Rao, Raj B Shetty	Midhun Mukundan
2.	"Henne"	Keerthan Bhandary	Deepak Doddera, Ruhee Ahamed A
3.	"Neenillade"	Raj B Shetty	Supriya Lohith, Raghu Ram
4.	"Keli Nodri- The Motte Song"	Raj B Shetty	Sooraj Santosh, Mridula Mukundan

== Critical reception ==
The film received positive reviews from critics. Deccan Chronicle wrote "Do not miss to watch this tale of an egg. It makes you fall in love, laugh, cry and most of all, it makes you realise the most beautiful aspect of life." Shyam S Prasad of Bangalore Mirror wrote "Ondu Motteya Kathe does not follow in the footsteps of such earlier Kannada films though. There is freshness in the approach. From the dialogues to the performances, there is a touch of new thinking. Motte does fall into familiar approaches in the second half. The plot is wrapped in a predictable manner. But with everything handled subtly, it comes across as a pioneering effort." Rakesh Mehar of News Minute wrote "There’s little that goes wrong with Ondu Motteya Kathe. Light and frothy, but also warm and empathetic, this film is one comedy you surely should not miss." Baradwaj Rangan of Film Companion South wrote "But slowly, Ondu Motteya Kathe moves towards a genre that could be called an anti-rom-com: despite the finding-a-mate hilarity, there’s an undertow of genuine sadness".

The film pays tribute to Rajkumar through subtle references, portraits, movie posters, scenes, and songs featured throughout the release. Debutant Raj Shetty wrote, directed, and starred in the film as the lead actor.

Movie was screened in Bangalore Bengali-Kannada Film Festival. It was one of the 4 films screened.

== Awards ==
Award	Category	Recipient	Result	Ref.
65th Filmfare Awards South	Best Kannada Film	Suhan Prasad; Pawan Kumar	Won	
65th Filmfare Awards South	Best Director	Raj B. Shetty	Nominated	
65th Filmfare Awards South	Best Supporting Actress	Usha Bhandari	Nominated	
7th SIIMA	Best Film	Suhan Prasad; Pawan Kumar	Nominated	
7th SIIMA	Best Debutant Actor (Male)	Raj B. Shetty	Nominated	
7th SIIMA	Best Debutant Director	Raj B. Shetty	Nominated	
