= List of FM radio stations in Bengaluru =

This is a list of radio stations in Bangalore, Karnataka, India.

- Radio City 91.1 FM – Kannada
- Radio Indigo 91.9 FM – English
- Big 92.7 FM – Kannada
- Red FM 93.5 FM – Hindi (from Nov 2012)
- Radio One 94.3 FM – English
- Radio Mirchi Radio 95 – Hindi
- Radio Mirchi 98.3 FM – Kannada.
- Amrutavarshini 100.1 FM – Classical music
- FM Rainbow 101.3 FM – Kannada, English & Hindi
- Vividh Bharati 102.9 FM – Kannada & Hindi
- Fever 104 FM – Hindi
- Gyanvani 106.4 FM – by IGNOU

This is a list of community radio stations

- City FM 95.7 FM – Kannada (Coming soon )
- Radio Active 90.4 FM
- Radio Neladani 90.8 FM
- Radio Universal CR 106.8 FM

This is a list of Internet radio stations

- Namm Radio Android/iOS app – Kannada's First Digital International Radio Station
- Radiochimpu – Kannada Internet Radio (including music for children and classical music)

== Radio City ==
Radio City is the first private FM radio station in INDIA and First FM station to come to Bengaluru and It was started on 3 July 2001 with the frequency 91 MHz. On 30 October 2006 it changed to the frequency 91.1 MHz.It is the only station in India to have completed 10 successful years and currently the number one station in Bengaluru according to RAM reports. It broadcasts for 24 hours around the clock. It is operated by Music Broadcast India Private Limited.

== FM Rainbow & Vividh Bharati ==
FM Rainbow & Vividh Bharati were the second & third radio stations. They are controlled by All India Radio. FM Rainbow was launched on 1 September 2001, while Vividh Bharati on 1 November 2001. Both stations broadcast for 17 hours daily from 5.20 to 23.20.

== Gyanvani ==
Gyanvani is the 4th radio station launched on 26 January 2004 with frequency 107.6 MHz. In January 2007, its frequency changed to 105.6 MHz. In March 2007 again its frequency was modified to 107.2 MHz. Since May 2009, it is transmitting in frequency 106.4 MHz. It is controlled by IGNOU. It broadcasts for a total of 10 hours daily, from 5.20 to 11.20 and 17.00 to 22.00. Gyanvani went off air since 1 October 2014 due to non-payment of dues to AIR.

== Amrutavarshini ==
Amrutavarshini is the 5th radio station featuring mostly Indian classical music. It was started on frequency 100.3 MHz and later modified to 100.1 MHz. It is operated by All India Radio. It broadcasts in morning and evening hours, from 6.00 to 09.30 and 18.30 to 23.00. This channel airs music of renowned masters of Indian classical music of both Carnatic and Hindustani ways. It is known to be resourceful for music learners. It is a platform with rich heritage for future generation music lovers with respect to classical music.

== Radio Mirchi ==
Radio Mirchi was the 6th radio station launched on 17 April 2006 with frequency 93.3 MHz. On 1 August 2006, it modified its frequency to 98.3 MHz. It broadcasts for 24 hours a day and is controlled by Entertainment Network India Limited.

== Radio One ==
Radio One was the 7th radio station launched on 1 August 2006 on a frequency of 94.3 MHz. It broadcasts from 6:00 AM to 1:30 AM. It is controlled by The Mid-Day Group.

== Radio Indigo ==
Radio Indigo was the 8th radio station launched on 19 September 2006, with a frequency of 91.9 MHz. It broadcasts for 24 hours a day and is controlled by Indigo Mass Communication Ltd.

== Big FM ==
Big FM was the 9th radio station launched on 9 October 2006, on frequency 92.7 MHz. Controlled by Reliance Broadcast, it broadcasts for 24 hours a day.

== Red FM ==
Red FM was the 10th radio station launched on 6 November 2006 on a frequency of 93.5 MHz, with the name S FM. On 24 August 2009, the name was modified to as Red FM. It broadcasts for 24 hours a day. It is controlled by Kal Radio Pvt Ltd. (Sun Network Ltd., a South Indian media house).

== Fever FM ==
Fever FM was the 11th radio station launched on 22 January 2007, on a frequency of 104 MHz. It broadcasts for 24 hoursa day. It is controlled by Hindustan Times & Virgin Radio.

== Radio Active ==
Radio Active, (Frequency:90.4 MHz) is Bengaluru's 12th radio station and first community radio station, launched on 25 June 2007, by Jain Group of Institutions.

== Radio Universal ==
Radio Universal, (Frequency:106.8 MHz) is Bengaluru's 13th radio station and second community radio station, launched on 21 June 2008, by Universal College. The station broadcasts from Vijaynagar Tollgate Circle, Magadi Main Road in Bengaluru.

== Radio Neladani ==
Radio Neladani, (Frequency:90.8 MHz) is Bengaluru's 14th radio station and third community radio station, launched on 3 September 2011. The station broadcasts from Nelamangala in rural North Bengaluru. The Neladani station is available in around 8–10 km radius of Nelamangala town covering Nelamangala and portion of Bengaluru North Taluk. This radio station was established with the help of Ministry of Agriculture, to produce content on farm related programs.

== Amateur (Ham) Radio ==
Bengaluru has highest number of Amateur Radio Operators (hams) and the frequency allotted to them are on frequencies 144 MHz to 146 MHz on VHF and 434 MHz-438 MHz on UHF primarily on Frequency Modulation (FM).

Nets are conducted such as R5 Net at 0700 IST on VU2RSB repeater at frequencies Transmit – 145.100 MHz and Receive – 145.700 MHz and 2030 hours IST on the VU2TWO repeater at frequencies transmit – 145.050 MHz and Receive – 145.650 MHz.

== Namm Radio ==
Namm Radio is Kannada's first digital international radio station which is across all 196 countries, TIER-2 and TIER-3 cities of Karnataka. In addition to NammRadio being available as a stream on website, the radio station is also available as an interactive mobile application' free to download in iOS and Android. Coffee with Kannan is popular show of NammRadio hosted by Hiremagaluru Kannan. NammRadio is owned by Pastime Productions Private Limited.

== Radio Chimpu ==
Radio Chimpu is a Kannada internet radio station. It was launched on 15 June 2017. It is currently broadcast from Bengaluru, Karnataka. Participations are offered to people of all ages and categories.

Radio Chimpu has its policy as "Listen to what you want, not to what the program directors want". The station broadcasts for 17 hours daily from 6.00 to 23.00.

== See also ==
- List of Kannada-language radio stations
- Media in Karnataka
- List of Kannada films
- List of Kannada magazines
- List of Kannada newspapers
- List of Kannada television channels
- List of radio stations in India
