= Anuradha Bhat =

Indian playback singer

- Born
- Origin: Mangalore, Dakshina Kannada, Karnataka, India
- Genres: Filmi, devotional, Bhavageete, children’s music
- Occupations: Vocalist, playback singer
- Instrument: Vocals
- Years active: 2006–present
- Website: https://www.anuradhabhat.com/

Anuradha Bhat is an Indian playback singer who predominantly works in Kannada language films. She has sung over 100 songs for feature films and also sung in various private musical albums.

== Early life and background ==
Anuradha Bhat was born to Sri krishna Bhat and Gayatri Bhat in Mangalore, Dakshina Kannada, Karnataka. Anuradha has a younger sister, Anupama Bhat who is a television host (TV anchor) and actor.

Anuradha Bhat received her primary education from Carmel school and later from premier institutes like Canara College and MSNM Besant PG Institute of Management Studies (both affiliated to Mangalore University)

== Career ==
Anuradha Bhat has worked in several non-film albums, remix songs, TV serials, children’s songs and rhymes. "Chinnu – Series of Kannada Animated Rhymes" . She also sung and featured in video single "Naa haaduve nimagaagiye" A compilation of few of her popular songs - “Anuradha Bhat mashup” is another video song that features her. "Navilugari" is yet another non-film song that she has rendered alongside Rajesh Krishnan.

== Discography ==
This is a partial list of notable films where Anuradha Bhat has worked as a playback singer.

Year	Song	Film / Album	Composer	Ref.
2006	Preethiyalli Naanu	Mohini 9886788888	Hamsalekha	
2009	Jinta Ta	Veera Madakari	M. M. Keeravani	
2009	Jum Jum Maaya	Veera Madakari	M. M. Keeravani	
2009	Neene Kane	Abhay	V. Harikrishna	
2009	Junglee Shivalingu	Junglee	V. Harikrishna	
2009	Baachiko	Dubai Babu	V. Sridhar	
2010	Nee Adada Maathu	Krishnan Love Story	V. Sridhar	
2010	Gandu Makkalu	Eno Onthara	V. Harikrishna	
2011	Avarivara Jothe	Jarasandha	Arjun Janya	
2011	Dhamma Dhamma	Kirataka	V. Manohar	
2011	Neenu Ninthare	Kool...Sakkath Hot Maga	V. Harikrishna	
2012	Kaddu Mucchi	Jaanu	V. Harikrishna	
2012	Nee Eshtu Muddu	Mr. 420	V. Harikrishna	
2012	Yaarivano Yaarivano	Yaare Koogadali	V. Harikrishna	
2012	Gaaliyalli Eejuvaase	Yaare Koogadali	V. Harikrishna	
2013	Baite Baite	Varadhanayaka	Arjun Janya	
2013	Ondhsari	Varadhanayaka	Arjun Janya	
2013	Kanna Minche Jaahirathu	Victory	Arjun Janya	
2013	Sri Krishna	Bhajarangi	Arjun Janya	
2013	Muddu Muddagi	Parari	J. Anoop Seelin	
2014	Chanana Chanana	Ugramm	Ravi Basrur	
2014	Ondu Hudugi	Ugramm	Ravi Basrur	
2014	Neenu Iruvaga	Ninnindale	Mani Sharma	
2014	Usiraaguve	Bahuparak	Bharath B. J.	
2014	Dheera Nanna Magadheeranu	Shivajinagara	Jassie Gift	
2015	Mareyada Pustaka	Rathaavara	Dharma Vish	
2016	O Baby	Ricky	Arjun Janya	
2016	Saaku Saakinnu	Krishna-Rukku	V. Sridhar	
2017	Appa I love you	Chowka	Arjun Janya	
2019	Kaaneyagiruve Naanu	Odeya	V. Harikrishna	
2019	Yeko Yeno	Bazaar	Ravi Basrur	
2019	Putta Putta Aase	Sinnga	Dharma Vish	
2021	Pataki Poriyo	Kotigobba 3	Arjun Janya	
2021	Geleyane Jeevavu	Ranam	Ravi Shankar Chinna	
2022	Edebaditha Joragide	Ek Love Ya	Arjun Janya	
2022	Sotheya Hrudaya	Triple Riding	Sai Karthik	
2022	Ee Hosa Sudina	Triple Riding	Sai Karthik	
2022	Usire Sereyagide	Kaaneyaadavara Bagge Prakatane	Arjun Janya	
2026	"Neene Nee Nanna"	Karikaada	Shashank Sheshagiri; K. Venkatesh	

=== Live performances and concerts ===
Anuradha Bhat has performed at various events Hampi Utsav, Mysore Dasara, Yuva Dasara, Mysore Winter Festival, Vishwa Kannada Sammelana and Bengaluru Ganesh Utsava (BGU)

She also performed in various countries namely United States of America (USA), London (UK), Netherlands (Europe), Australia, Africa, Hong Kong, UAE, Oman, Qatar, Kuwait and Bahrain.

== Awards and nominations ==
Won

- Karnataka State Film Award for Best Female Playback Singer (2012) presented by the Government of Karnataka for her song "Jnaanajyothi" from the movie "Little Master"
- Filmfare Award for Best Female Playback Singer – Kannada (2015) for "Chanana Chanana" from the movie Ugramm
- RED FM Tulu Film Awards Best Female Playback Singer – Tulu (2016) for "Mahamaye" from the movie Chaali Polilu
- Filmfare Award for Best Female Playback Singer – Kannada (2018) for "Appa I love you" from the movie Chowka
- SIIMA Award for Best Female Playback Singer – Kannada for "Appa I love you" from the movie Chowka
- Filmfare Award for Best Female Playback Singer – Kannada (2022) for "Dheera Sammohagaara" from the movie Bicchugatti

Nominations

- Filmfare Award for Best Female Playback Singer – Kannada (2013) for "Ellello Oduva Manase (Female)" from the movie Sidlingu
- Filmfare Award for Best Female Playback Singer – Kannada (2014) for "Srikrishna" from the movie Bhajarangi
- SIIMA Award for Best Female Playback Singer – Kannada (2015) for "Neenu Iruvaga" from the movie Ninnindale
- Filmfare Award for Best Female Playback Singer – Kannada (2016) for "Irali Hege" from the movie Benkipatna
- Filmfare Award for Best Female Playback Singer – Kannada (2017) for "Yavoora Geleya" from the movie Ricky
- Filmfare Award for Best Female Playback Singer – Kannada (2019) for "Holeva Holeyachege (Slow)" from the movie Ammachi Yemba Nenapu
- Chandanavana Film Critics Award for Best Female Singer (2020) for "Elliruve Hariye" from the movie Kurukshetra
- Chandanavana Film Critics Award for Best Female Singer (2020–2021) for "Dheera Sammohagaara" from the movie Bicchugatti

== Television ==
Year	Television	Role	Ref
2021–2023	Sa Re Ga Ma Pa Championship	Mentor	
