= Shashank Sheshagiri =

Indian singer (born 1991)

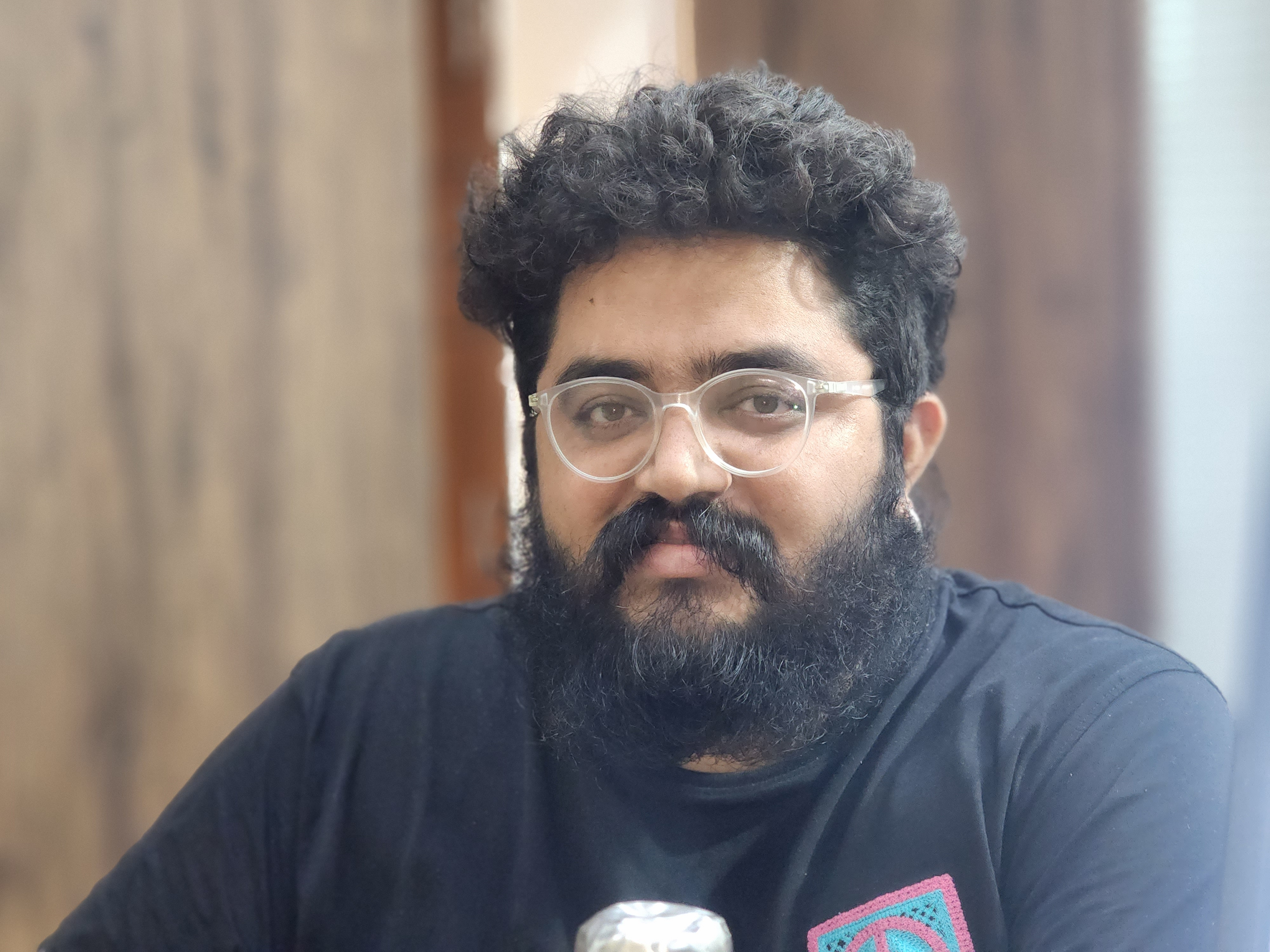

Background information
- Born: 10 August 1991 (age 35); Shimoga, Karnataka, India
- Genres: Classical, semi-classical, playback singing
- Occupations: Singer, composer, actor
- Instruments: Vocal
- Years active: 2009–present

Shashank Sheshagiri is an Indian playback singer, live performer and composer who works in Kannada, Tulu, Telugu and Tamil film Industries.

== Background ==
Shashank was born to Sheshagiri. A & Arundathi K.P in Shimoga, Karnataka. Shashank's parents are originally from Mysore, Karnataka. The art of singing was in Shashank's life since the day of his birth, as his parents were live performers who sang during family weddings and other programs. Although Shashank has not learnt any traditional music, his mother Arundathi K.P - a classical singer - is his first guru. With her he started his singing journey by giving his first stage performance at the age of four to sing a devotional song 'Narayana Ninna'. After which he began accompanying his parents to sing at family weddings and parties.

To begin his career in singing, he moved to Bangalore at the age of 18. In the year 2008 he made his big success by winning the Kannada singing reality show 'Haadina Bandi' telecast by Kasthuri Channel. Later in the year 2009 he made his debut as a Playback Singer in the film Meghave Meghave directed by V. Nagendra Prasad, by whom Shashank got to record three songs straight for the first time.

In 2014, his song 'Doona Doona' from the movie 'Belli' has made him the winner of the title 'mirchi best upcoming playback singer' in Mirchi Music Awards.

His song 'Mathdro' from Krishna Leela movie was nominated for IIFA Utsavam 2016. Since then he recorded several hit numbers for various music directors across the south, predominantly in the Kannada film industry. To this date Shashank has sung more than 500 songs in the South Indian film industry. His previous film to hit the theaters was Yajamana in the year 2019. Shashank has also given his voice for Radio commercials and T.V serials.

Other than playback singing he also sings at music festivals and corporate shows with his band 'Swar Alap'. Where, he has performed in abroad countries like Kuwait and Muscat.

== Discography ==
- Meghave Meghave – Bellana Biliyettu (2009)
- Jarasandha – Yaaradru Haalagi Hogali (2011)
- Vinayaka Geleyara Balaga – Nodi Swamy (2011)
- Crazy Loka – Don't worry (2012)
- Dashamukha – Yaarigu Heladhe (2012)

=== 2014 ===
Film	Song	Music director	Language
"Belli"	Doona Doona	V. Sridhar	Kannada
"Kwatle Satish"	Dankanaka	V. Harikrishna	Kannada
"Sadagara"	Lovvu Ondhu strongu	V. Sridhar	Kannada
"Namaste Madam"	Kannu kaadutide, Panchendriyagala	Kannada	
"Bahaddur"	Hutto Surya	V. HarikrishnaI	Kannada
"Jai Lalitha"	Kannada Savi Kannada	V. Sridhar	Kannada

=== 2015 ===
Film	Song	Music directors	Language
"Mr. Airavata"	Title track, Guddi mele gante	V. Harikrishna	Kannada
"Krishna Leela"	maatadro	V. Sridhar	Kannada
"Charlie"	Touch Touch	Veer Samarth	Kannada
"Mumtaz (movie)"	Lovingu baatlingu		Kannada
"Rukku"	Hatthu Urigella	AT Raveesh	Kannada
"Ekka Saka"	Daaye Bombedaata	Ravi Basrur	Tulu
"Bombay Mittai"	Haadona Koogi	Veer Samarth	Kannada
"Goa"	Shuruvaythu	Arjun Janya	Kannada
"Tyson"	Preetistini	Ravi Basrur, Jassie Gift	Kannada

=== 2016 ===
Film	Song	Music directors	Language
"Jaggu Dada"	Duniyare Duniya	V. Harikrishna	Kannada
"Jil Jil"	hudugi nanne, Just enjoy, Crazy Gang	A. Madhu	Kannada
"Maduveya Mamatheya Kareyole"	Hudugi	V. Harikrishna	Kannada
"Gajapade"	Raktha Charithe, Badko Badko	Abhilash, Joel	Kannada
"Sipayi"	Kannalle Meetingu	B. Ajaneesh Loknath	Kannada
"Cinema My Darling"	Ninge ninge	B. Ajaneesh Loknath	Kannada
"Simple aag Innondh love story"	Sevanthige Chendinanthe	Bharath B. J., Saikiran	Kannada
"Viraat"	Le Le Avnu	V. Harikrishna, Raghu Kunche	Kannada
"Sundaranga Jaana"	Fly..Fly	B. Ajaneesh Loknath	Kannada
"Santhu Straight Forward"	Self made	V. Harikrishna	Kannada
"Bhale Jodi"	Hello Hello	Sadhu Kokila	Kannada
"Badmaash"	Kannalle Saavira	Judah Sandhy	Kannada
"Krishna-Rukku"	C for Cow	V. Sridhar	Kannada
"Ooty"	Nannolava Devatheye	Raj Bhaskar	Kannada

=== 2017 ===
Film	Song	Music director	Language
"Bharjari"	Bharjari Soundu	V. Harikrishna	Kannada
"Raajakumara"	Yaarivanu	V. Harikrishna	Kannada
"Sarvasva"	Chikki Bali	Shreyas Kabadi	Kannada
"Srikanta"	Antharanga, Shiva Shiva	B. Ajaneesh Loknath	Kannada
"Uppu Huli Khara"	Nagin, Uppu Huli Kaara	Prajwal Rai	Kannada
"Raajaru"	Neene Kaanthiyalla	V. Sridhar	Kannada
"Dheera"	Na koti	Yuvan Shankar Raja	Kannada
"Dream Girl"	My dream girl	Ghandarva Rahut Rai	Kannada
"Life 360"	Theme song	Akash Shivakumar, Prajwal Rai	Kannada
"Kireeta"	Bolo Jai Jai		Kannada
"Hai"	Jai Javaan	Jassie Gift	Kannada
"Crack"	Ca Ca CA cracku	Shamitha	Kannada
"Jinda"	Maayaka	V. Sridhar	Kannada
"Dumki Damar"	Baaro Baaro	S. Pradeep Varma	Kannada
"Amaravathi"	Bidugade	Abhilash, Joel	Kannada
"First love"	Lipiaytu Lipayali	V. Sridhar	Kannada
"Mumbai"	Bombay mittai	V. Sridhar	Kannada
"Jani"	Kaddu Kaddu, Bangade Bangade	Jassie Gift	Kannada
"Kariya 2"	Kariya Bandawne	Karan B Krupa	Kannada
"Veera Ranachandi"	Title song	S. P Venkatesh	Kannada

=== 2018 ===
Film	Song	Music director	Language
"Kirrak Party"	Last Bench, Sir bewerse	B. Ajaneesh Loknath	Telugu
"Minus 3 Plus 1"	Raakshasa iva Raakshasa	AT Raveesh	Kannada
"Snehave Preethi"	Machuchu Figurire	Ghatikachalam	Kannada
"Bhairava Geetha"	Yee Dasaryada Mushtiyu	Ravi Shankar	Kannada
"Raja loves Radhe"	Nooru Galli	Veer Samarth	Kannada
"Kannada Deshadol"	Kannada Deshadol	Aditya V Nayak, Galaate Govind	Kannada
"I Dash You"	Yetu yetu yetandre	Aadil Nadaf	Kannada
"Vajra"	Pyaari pyaari	Monish Kumar	Kannada
"Idam Premam Jeevaman"	Jeevana kali	Judah Sandhy	Kannada
"Shiva Paaru"	it's time to dance	America Suresh	Kannada
"3000"	Happy Happy	Clarence Allen Crasta	Kannada
"Brihaspathi"	Dandam Dashagunam	V. Harikrishna	Kannada
Title track	Manju Charan	Kannada	

=== 2019 ===
Film	Song	Music director	Language
"Padde Huli"	Naa Tumba Hosaba	B. Ajaneesh Loknath	Kannada
"Sinnga"	Aata Haaku	Dharma Vish	Kannada
"Yajamana"	Shivanandi	V. Harikrishna	Kannada
"Randhawa"	Yelli Nodalallella	Himself	Kannada
"Geetha"	Party Maadu	Anup Rubens	Kannada
"Nruthyam"	Udtha Udtha	Abhishek Jain MK	Kannada
"Missed Call"	Preethsodhu	Vijay Krishna	Kannada
"Boy"	Last working day	Jaya Prakash, Elvin James	Telugu
"Sarvajanikarige Suvarnavakasha"	Title track	Midhun Mukundan	Kannada
"Yaana"	Beauty Queen	Joshua Sridhar, Anoop Seelin	Kannada
"Premasura"	Sonta Kuniso	Harsha Kogod	Kannada
"Bharaate"	Theme song	Arjun Janya	Kannada
"Panchatantra"	Ee vayasali	V. Harikrishna	Kannada
"Dabbang 3(Kan)"	Anna Kai jaari hodha	Sajid–Wajid	Kannada
"Avane Srimannarayana"	Hands up	B. Ajaneesh Loknath, Charan Raj	Kannada

=== 2020 ===
Film	Song	Music director	Language	Notes
"Krishna Talkies"	Nighty Maatra	V. Sridhar	Kannada	
"Haalakki"	Banni Banni	S. Naagu	Kannada	
"Takkar"	Aane Nadhdidde Daari	Manikanth Kadri	Kannada	
"Gaddappana Circle"	Cooldagu Kwapabeda	Nayan VK	Kannada	
"3rd Class"	Title Track	Jassie Gift	Kannada	
"Veshadhari"	Tyaagi baara	V. Manohar	Kannada	
"Huli Durga"	Akasha Nakkanthe	Satish babu	Kannada	
"Aadyaa"	Jothe Jothe saago	V. Sridhar	Kannada	
"Namo"	Enjoy the party	Sai Sarvesh	Kannada	
"Prarthana"	RaamaSkandam, Aaradam maduram, omkaaram bindu	Sunaad Gowtham	Kannada	Post Production
"BMW"	Saturday	Sriram Gandharwa	Kannada	Post Production
"Roberrt"	Ba Ba Na Ready	Arjun Janya	Kannada	

=== As Music Composer ===
Film	Song	Language	Director	Year
Uppu Huli Khara	Background Score	Kannada	Imran Sardaria	2018
Randhawa	Music Composer	Kannada	Sunil Acharya	2019
The Checkmate	Music Composer	Kannada	Santosh Chippadi and Bharateesha Vasishta	2022
Gowli	Music Composer	Kannada	Soora	2023
Mariguddada Gaddadharigalu	Background Score	Kannada	R. Chandrakanth	2023
Dharani	Music Composer	Kannada	Sudheer Shanbhogue	On Floor

=== Independent music ===
Year	Title	Music by	Language	Lyrics	Label	Distribution
2021	Love Status	Praveen Srinivasmurthy	Kannada	Manjunatheshwara K J	Pragati Bimba	DIVO Music

== Awards and nominations ==
Year (Note: Refers to the year in which the award ceremony was held.)	Film	Song	Award	Category	Result
2014	Belli	Doona Doona	Mirchi Music Awards South	Mirchi Best Play back singer	Won
2015	Krishna Leela	Maathadro	IIFA Utsavam 2015	Best Playback singer male	Nominated

== Reality shows ==
Year	Network	Show Name	Status
2008	Kasturi Channel	Haadina Bandi	Winner
2009		Voice of Mysore	Winner
2010	Suvarna Channel	Idea Star Singer	Top 10th Contestant
2012	Kasturi Channel	Super Star 2	Winner
