= List of Kannada-language radio stations =

This is a list of radio stations in Kannada.

== Bengaluru ==
Radio station	Frequency	Tagline	Language	Notes	Ref
Radio City	91.1	′What a fun!′	Kannada	Private FM in India	
Radio Indigo	91.9	′The color of music′	English		
BIG FM	92.7	'ಯೋಚನೆ ಯಾಕೆ ಚೇಂಜ್ ಓಕೆ′ (Why to think, change is OK)	Kannada		
Red FM	93.5	Masth maja madi	Kannada		
Radio One	94.3	′The station for the fatafat generation! (the station for the quick generation!)′	English		
Radio Mirchi	95.0		Hindi		
Radio Mirchi	98.3	′ಸಕ್ಕತ್ ಹಾಟ್ ಮಗಾ′ (Too hot, son)	Kannada		
Amruthavarshini	100.1		Kannada	Hindustani and Carnatic Classical music	
AIR FM Rainbow	101.3	'Kannada Kamanabillu' (Kannada rainbow)	Kannada		
Vividha Bharathi	102.9				
Fever	104	′ಬೊಂಬಾಟ್ ಕನ್ನಡ, ಅಷ್ಟೇ!′ (Beautiful Kannada, Thats it!)	Kannada		
Namm Radio		′ಯಾಕಂದ್ರೆ ಕನ್ನಡ ಕೇಳೋ ಮಜಾನೇ ಬೇರೆ!′ (Because enjoyment of listening to kannada is different!)		Kannada's first International digital radio	

== See also ==
- List of FM radio stations in Bangalore
- Media in Karnataka
- List of Kannada films
- List of Kannada magazines
- List of Kannada newspapers
- List of Kannada television channels
- List of radio stations in India
