= Weekend with Ramesh =

Indian talk show

- Genre: Talk show
- Created by: Raghavendra Hunsur
- Based on: Achievers of Karnataka
- Written by: Pradyumna Narahalli
- Presented by: Ramesh Aravind
- Theme music composer: Vijay Prakash
- Country of origin: India
- Original language: Kannada
- No. of seasons: 5
- No. of episodes: 132 (list of episodes)

Production
- Executive producer: Anil Kumar J
- Producer: Zee Kannada
- Production locations: Abbaiah Naidu Studio, Bengaluru
- Cinematography: Inhouse
- Editor: Inhouse
- Camera setup: Multi-camera
- Running time: 90 minutes
- Production company: Zee Entertainment Enterprises

Original release
- Network: Zee Kannada
- Release: 2 August 2014 – 11 June 2023

Weekend with Ramesh is an Indian talk show hosted by Ramesh Aravind on Zee Kannada. The first season of the show began airing on 2 August 2014, and ended on 26 October 2014, after airing 26 episodes. The second season of the show aired from 26 December 2015 to 16 April 2016. The third season aired from 26 March 2017 and 2 July 2017. Raghavendra Hunsur directed the first Season, Prakash G., seasons 2 and 3, while Anil Kumar J. directed seasons 4 and 5. Pradyumna Narahalli wrote the seasons 2 and 3.

== Overview ==
The format of the show involves achievers on various fields, primarily from Karnataka, being invited and the story of their life being told. It involves appearances of various people associated with the "achiever" who narrate incidents from their association with the person. The show is being taped at Abbaiah Naidu Studio in the Chikkalasandra locality of Bangalore. The first season began airing on 2 August 2014, with actor Puneeth Rajkumar as the first invitee. Season 1 ended on 26 October, with the host Ramesh Aravind on the "achievers' seat", with film director and lyricist Yogaraj Bhat as the host.

The second season saw invitees mostly personalities of Kannada cinema like Vijay Prakash, Rajesh Krishnan, Ambareesh, Darshan, S. P. Balasubrahmanyam, Anant Nag, Raghu Dixit, Sudeepa. Season three saw a mix of professions with achievers from entertainment industry like Arjun Janya, Gangavathi Pranesh, Bharathi Vishnuvardhan; poet, writer, lyricist Jayanth Kaikini; former judge of the Supreme Court Of India, former Solicitor General of India and Lokayukta for Karnataka N. Santosh Hegde; police officer Ravi D. Channannavar; businessman Vijay Sankeshwar; litterateur, priest, writer Hiremagaluru Kannan and some politicians. The season 4 was aired starting 20 April 2019. Philanthropist and the Dharmadhikari of the Dharmasthala Temple Veerendra Heggade, industrialist and co-founder of Infosys N. R. Narayana Murthy and an inspirational writer, speaker, philanthropist, chairperson of the Infosys Foundation Sudha Murthy were invited.

The show returned after a three-year gap for its fifth season, in March 2023. It was reported that the makers hoped to have film personalities Rishab Shetty and Dhananjaya, cardiac surgeon Devi Shetty, and former cricketers Rahul Dravid and Anil Kumble on the show. Actress Ramya was the first guest on the show, which was aired on 25 March. The deputy chief minister of Karnataka D. K. Shivakumar was the last guest of the season.

== List of episodes ==
=== Season 1 ===
No.	Guest(s)	Original air date
1	Puneeth Rajkumar	2 August 2014
2	Puneeth Rajkumar	3 August 2014
3	V. Ravichandran	9 August 2014
4	V. Ravichandran	10 August 2014
5	H. R. Ranganath	16 August 2014
6	Arjun Sarja	17 August 2014
7	Yash	23 August 2014
8	Yash	24 August 2014
9	Yogaraj Bhat	30 August 2014
10	T. N. Seetharam	31 August 2014
11	Dwarakish	6 September 2014
12	Ashwin Karthik	7 September 2014
13	Radhika Pandit	13 September 2014
14	Gurukiran	14 September 2014
15	Upendra	20 September 2014
16	Upendra	21 September 2014
17	Shiva Rajkumar	27 September 2014
18	Shiva Rajkumar	28 September 2014
19	G. R. Gopinath	4 October 2014
20	Syed Afsar	5 October 2014
21	Umashree	11 October 2014
22	Mukhyamantri Chandru	12 October 2014
23	Master Hirannaiah	18 October 2014
24	Tara	19 October 2014
25	Ramesh Aravind	25 October 2014
26	Ramesh Aravind	26 October 2014

=== Season 2 ===
No.	Guest(s)	Original air date
1	Prem	26 December 2015
2	Rakshita	27 December 2015
3	Vijay Prakash	2 January 2016
4	Vijay Prakash	3 January 2016
5	Duniya Vijay	9 January 2016
6	Rajesh Krishnan	10 January 2016
7	Devaraj	16 January 2016
8	Rangayana Raghu	17 January 2016
9	Ambareesh	23 January 2016
10	Ambareesh	24 January 2016
11	Darshan	30 January 2016
12	Darshan	31 January 2016
13	Sadhu Kokila	6 February 2016
14	Sadhu Kokila	7 February 2016
15	Srujan Lokesh	13 February 2016
16	Doddanna	14 February 2016
17	Srinath	20 February 2016
18	Srinath	21 February 2016
19	S. P. Balasubrahmanyam	27 February 2016
20	S. P. Balasubrahmanyam	28 February 2016
21	Anant Nag	5 March 2016
22	Anant Nag	6 March 2016
23	Lakshmi	12 March 2016
24	Lakshmi	13 March 2016
25	Raghu Dixit	19 March 2016
26	Raghu Dixit	20 March 2016
27	Leealavathi	26 March 2016
28	Rockline Venkatesh	27 March 2016
29	Sudha Rani	2 April 2016
30	B. Saroja Devi	3 April 2016
31	Saikumar	9 April 2016
32	P. Ravi Shankar	10 April 2016
33	Kiccha Sudeepa	16 April 2016
34	Kiccha Sudeepa	17 April 2016

=== Season 3 ===
No.	Guest(s)	Original air date
1	Prakash Raj	25 March 2017
2	Prakash Raj	26 March 2017
3	Jaggesh	1 April 2017
4	Jaggesh	2 April 2017
5	Arjun Janya	8 April 2017
6	Arjun Janya	9 April 2017
7	Gangavathi Pranesh	15 April 2017
8	Gangavathi Pranesh	16 April 2017
9	Bharathi Vishnuvardhan	22 April 2017
10	Jayanth Kaikini	23 April 2017
11	Ravi D. Channannavar	29 April 2017
12	V. Harikrishna	30 April 2017
13	Rakshit Shetty	6 May 2017
14	Priyamani	7 May 2017
15	Kashinath	13 May 2017
16	N. Santosh Hegde	14 May 2017
17	Krishnegowda	20 May 2017
18	Vijay Raghavendra	21 May 2017
19	B. Jayashree	3 June 2017
20	Vijay Sankeshwar	4 June 2017
21	H. D. Deve Gowda	10 June 2017
22	H. D. Deve Gowda	11 June 2017
23	Shruthi	17 June 2017
24	Hiremagaluru Kannan	18 June 2017
25	Siddaramaiah	24 June 2017
26	Siddaramaiah	25 June 2017
27	Ganesh	1 July 2017
28	Ganesh	2 July 2017

=== Season 4 ===
No.	Guest(s)	Original air date
1	Veerendra Heggade	20 April 2019
2	Veerendra Heggade	21 April 2019
3	Raghavendra Rajkumar	27 April 2019
4	Raghavendra Rajkumar	28 April 2019
5	Prema	4 May 2019
6	Prakash Belawadi	5 May 2019
7	Shashi Kumar	11 May 2019
8	Vinaya Prasad	12 May 2019
9	Sriimurali	18 May 2019
10	Sriimurali	19 May 2019
11	N. R. Narayana Murthy	1 June 2019
12	Sudha Murthy	2 June 2019
13	Sumalatha	8 June 2019
14	T. S. Nagabharana	9 June 2019
15	Sharan	15 June 2019
16	Sharan	16 June 2019
17	Vaijanath Biradar	21 June 2019
18	Chikkanna	22 June 2019
19	Shankar Bidari	29 June 2019
20	B. B. Ashok Kumar	30 June 2019
21	Rajendra Singh Babu	6 July 2019
22	Chandrashekhara Kambara	7 July 2019

=== Season 5 ===
No.	Guest(s)	Original air date
1	Ramya	25 March 2023
2	Ramya	26 March 2023
3	Prabhu Deva	1 April 2023
4	Prabhu Deva	2 April 2023
5	C. N. Manjunath	8 April 2023
6	H. G. Dattatreya	9 April 2023
7	Dhananjaya	15 April 2023
8	Dhananjaya	16 April 2023
9	Avinash	22 April 2023
10	Mandya Ramesh	23 April 2023
11	Sihi Kahi Chandru	29 April 2023
12	Gururaj Karjagi	30 April 2023
13	Prem	6 May 2023
14	Prem	7 May 2023
15	Chinni Prakash	13 May 2023
16	N. Someswara	14 May 2023
17	V. Nagendra Prasad	20 May 2023
18	S K Umesh	21 May 2023
19	Doddarangegowda	27 May 2023
20	Jai Jagadish	28 May 2023
21	D. K. Shivakumar	10 June 2023
22	D. K. Shivakumar	11 June 2023
