= Chandrashekar Bandiyappa =

Indian film director

- Born: Mandya district, India
- Other names: CSB, Chandru, Shekar
- Occupations: Film Director, Writer, Author & Advocate
- Years active: 2013–present
- Spouse: Pooja A. V.
- Children: 2

Chandrashekar Bandiyappa is an Indian film director who was born in Ummadahalli, a small village from Mandya district. With an academic qualification of M.Sc. from Mysore University, LLB from KSLU, and B.Ed. from Bangalore University and a Diploma in Film Technology from KANFIDA. He has been with the industry for almost two decades now. He has worked as an associate director with many directors including S. Narayan and Rajendra Singh Babu. He made his debut in 2013 with the film Aane Pataaki and rose to fame with the Kannada film Rathavara.

== Personal life ==
Chandrashekar Bandiyappa was born on 6 February 1981 into a farming family in Mandya. His parents are Kalegowda and Thayamma. Bandiyappa married Pooja in 2016 and the couple has two daughters by the names of Bhoomi.B.Gowda and Rahitya.B.Gowda.

Bandiyappa wished to work in the film industry ever since he was a kid, which was highly influenced by his father who was also worked in theatres as an artist.

== Career ==
In an interview, Bandiyappa mentioned that his interest for films was primarily inspired by watching his father acting on stage during his childhood. And, this influence was turned into a decision at the age of 11 when he watched his father perform the role of Duryodhana from the epic play Mahabharata in his hometown.

And for the same reason he moved to Bengaluru after finishing his degree in M.Sc. and took up Diploma in Film Technology from KANFIDA, which taught him the depths of film making.

During his career, Bandiyappa has worked as an Assistant & Associate Director with many renowned directors of KFI.

In the year 2006 he entered the industry as an assistant director with the renowned Kannada actor Jai Jagadish who had set to make his debut as a director for the movie Madana. Although, it was not a great box-office success, it did have critiques applauding the story line.

He then went on to work as an associate director with [S. Narayan] and [Rajendra Singh Babu] for many films like Veera Parampare starring Kiccha Sudeepa & Ambareesh directed by S.Narayan, Shyloo starring Golden Star Ganesh and also Bheemoo's Bang Bang Kids starring Upendra & Ramya directed by Rajendra Singh Babu.

Bandiyappa has also written the Kannada version of the Malayalam hit movie Chattambinadu which starred the super star Mammotty and directed by the famous director Shafi.

Bandiyappa made his debut as a director with the movie Aane Pataaki starring Srujan Lokesh, Jai Jagadish, Sadhu Kokila, Rangayana Raghu and many more. The movie is about a wannabe actor who comes to the city aspiring to become a hero. However, because of his innocence and naivety he is often teased and made fun. He is invited to a party at the house of a movie producer because of an error made by the producers secretary. There he falls in love with a "Star Guest".

In August 2014, Bandiyappa joined hands with the Ugramm star Sri Murali for Rathavara. The film hosted the casting of a winning combination comprising P. Ravishankar, Rachita Ram, Sadhu Kokila, Chikkanna, Saurav Lokesh, Charan Raj and many more. Rathavara was released on 4 December 2015 where it received mixed to positive reviews from critics and became a box office hit by running for 125 days in the theatres. Sri Murali also mentioned that one of the action sequences was one of the toughest scenes he ever shot as it was shot near Srirangapattana in a water canal that is almost 3 kilometers long. This also became a key scene which made the audience remember Sri Murali and Saurav Lokesh for a very long time. The camera work is another strong point of this movie and at the helm it was Bhuvan Gowda who later went on to become a top marquee is the world of cinematography. Bhuvan Gowda has also worked as the Cinematographer for KGF: Chapter 1, KGF: Chapter 2 and Salaar:Part 1 – Ceasefire.

Then in 2018, Bandiyappa directed his next movie Tharakaasura which starred the debutant Vybhav, Manvitha in lead roles. The movie also had the Hollywood actor Danny Sapani as lead villain delivering incredible acting. The movie depicted story of the Budbudke tribe and received a massive response from the audience for the making and story line. The movie was also nominated in two categories in the SIIMA awards.

Bandiyappa's work was recognized and was offered to direct his first Bollywood movie in 2021 Red Collar and has finished shooting with post production in works right now. The movie starrs Kishore Kumar G in the lead along with Sargam Gupta, Rachna Shyam, Sunetra Pandit, Arjun Gowda and more. Music for this movie has been composed by Dharma Vish. The director said that this movie is a bone chilling crime thriller which will keep the audience glued to their seats. Release date to be announced soon.

In July 2024 Bandiyappa announced his new movie Chowkidar. Speaking to the media, he explained that Chowkidar is a family-action-drama which connects to the audience in a unique way. The story represents every house hold's ups and lows and will grip the minds of the audience for a very long time. The movie also casts Pruthvi Ambaar and Dhanya Ramkumar in lead roles. The star cast of the movie also includes legendary stars like P. Sai Kumar, Shweta, Sudharani, Muni in important roles. Dharma and Arjun Gowda have taken the helm of working as lead villains in this movie. The movie wrapped up its shooting in December 2024 and expected to release by early 2025.

Other than this, Bandiyappa has also penned the story for the upcoming movie Karavali directed by Ambi Ninge Vayassaitho fame directed Guruduth Ganiga, starring Prajwal Devaraj in the lead role. The story is said to be revolving the lives of people from coastal regions of Karnataka. The teaser released earlier in 2024 shows promises of a grand making with thrilling storyline, which Bandiyappa is famous for.

== Filmography ==
Key
†	Denotes films that have not yet been released

Year	Film	Notes
2013	Aane Pataaki	
2015	Rathavara	Nominated during SIIMA for the Best Director
2018	Tharakaasura	'Chitrasanthe' award for best story
2026	Chowkidar	
