= Gowdanapalya =

Coordinates: 12°54′34″N 77°33′24″E

Gowdanapalya is one of the residential localities in Bangalore, India. It is situated in the south of the city, very close to the highway leading to Kanakapura. It is surrounded by Kumaraswamy Layout, Padmanabhanagar, Kadirenahalli, Uttarahalli, and Chikkalasandra. Its pincode is 560061

It is considered to be one of the rapidly growing areas in Bangalore. Despite this, it is also one of the most traditional places in the city due to the substantial population of Kannadigas. The area acts as a connecting link between ISRO Layout/Kumaraswamy Layout and Padmanabhanagar.

Gowdanapalya is known for Rapsri engineering industries ltd, one of India's largest copper processing firms. There are many educational institutions such as Bangalore International Public School, Prarthana School and Bright Way School. The popular cinema theatre Srinivasa Theatre is located in the area.

It once had two big lakes, Dore Kere and Gowdana-Kere. Now it has reduced to just one, Dore Kere, due to a lack of care from officials and residents. Dore kere is popular among joggers. It also has a park with gym equipments and next to Dore kere there is an area for playing various sports like tennis, cricket, football and badminton. Gowdanapalya has a vast historical past rooted in religion and mythology. In 1965, there were just 18 houses which primarily grew finger millet. The descendants of the oldest family in the 1960s still live in Gowdanapalya. Every friday, many local residents reportedly pray to Durga for her blessings.

Gowdanapalya currently suffers from many issues pertaining to cleanliness, infrastructure and urban development; despite many attempts being made by citizen activists and authorities.

== Transport ==
The area is well connected through BMTC buses. Most of the buses going to Uttarahalli pass through the Gowdanapalya junction.

- Towards Kempegowda Bus Terminus : 210N, 210NA, 210P, 210Z, 210NB, 210ND
- Towards K R Market : 210N, 210NA, 210P, 210Z, 210NB, 210ND
- Towards Shivajinagar : 210Q, 210H
- Towards Kengeri: 375 series

The nearest Namma Metro station is Banashankari on the Green Line of Namma Metro.
