= Pradyumna Narahalli =

Indian actor and screenwriter

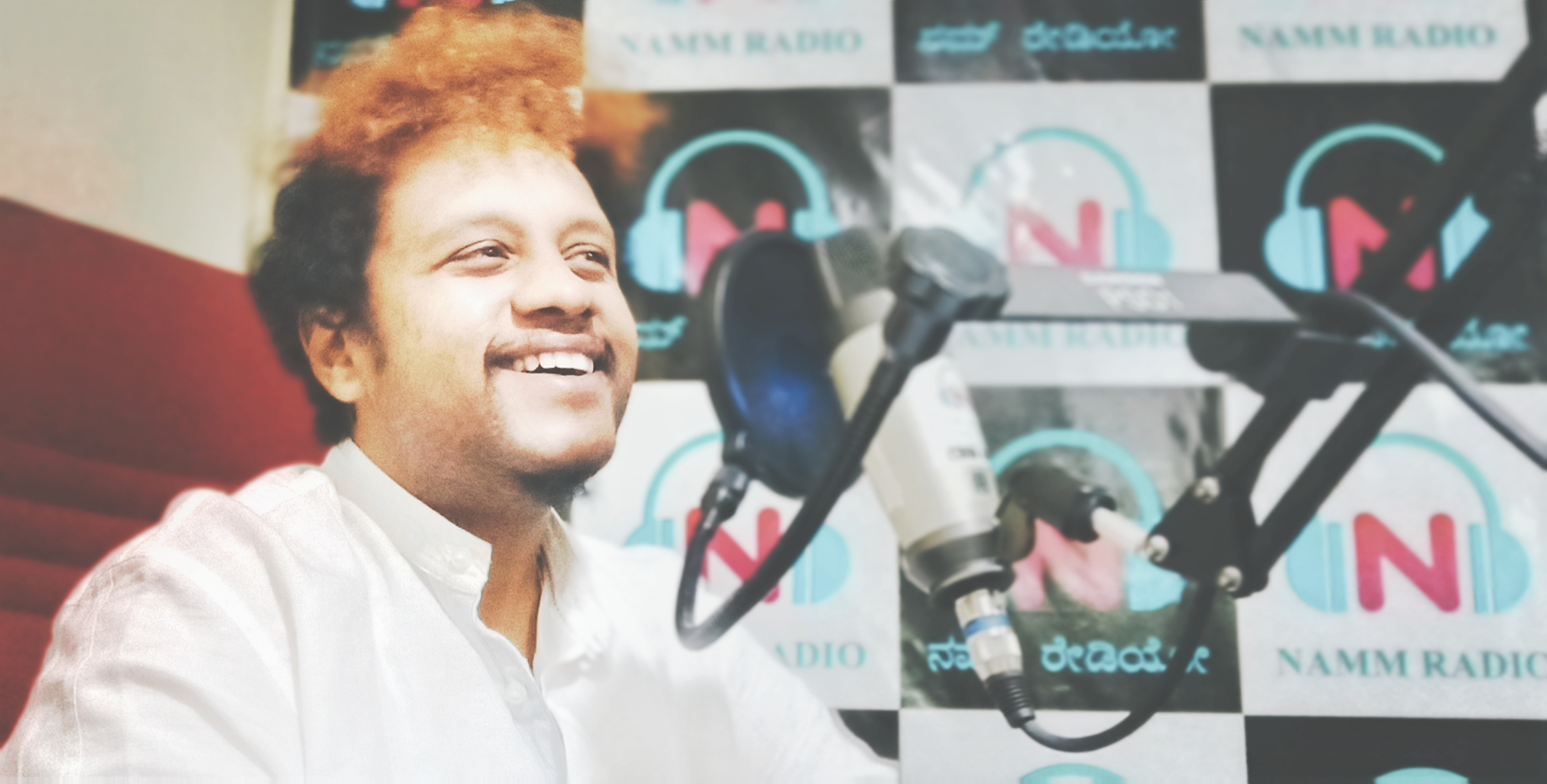
- Pradyumna recording a show at Nammradio
- Born: 10 April 1988 (age 38); Hassan, Karnataka, India
- Years active: 2012–present

Pradyumna Narahalli (born 10 April 1988), is an Indian actor, lyricist, writer, RJ, director and producer, known primarily for his work in Kannada television and cinema.

He is known for his lyrics in the Kannada films Sundaranga Jaana (2016), Srikanta (2017), Manasu Malligey (2017), Bruhaspathi (2017). He also made his acting debut with Sundaranga Jaana, alongside Golden Star Ganesh, directed by veteran director Ramesh Aravind.

He started his career in television and has been a writer for superhit shows in Star Suvarna and Zee Kannada. He is known for designing content, talkback and scripting for superhit shows like Bigg Boss Season 2, Weekend with Ramesh Season 2 & 3, Drama Juniors Season 1 & 2 and Sa Re Ga Ma Pa Season 12 & 13.

Since 2016, he has been active both in Kannada cinema & television working in various departments. His latest project was Pailwaan, starring Kiccha Sudeep, directed by acclaimed director S. Krishna which is a blockbuster hit of 2019. He worked as an associate director and actor in the movie.

== Early life and education ==
Pradyumna Narahalli was born to Somesh Narahalli and Vidya Somesh in Hassan district, Karnataka. His surname Narahalli, is the name of his native village in Mandya district, Pandavapura Taluk.

He did his schooling in Sri Vidya Mandir Education Society, Malleswaram. He was introduced to theatre at an early age of 6 in this very school. He was a regular in annual day celebrations which used to be held in Chowdaiah memorial hall. He was known for his confidence and improvisation skills on stage in front of thousands of live audience.

His pre-university college was MES Kishore Kendra. He started doing mimicry in this college and was known for imitating professors in MESKK. He was equally popular amongst students and faculty alike.

He obtained a bachelor's degree in Mechanical Engineering from M.S.Ramaiah Institute of Technology, Bangalore. He was active in cultural activities and was known for his mimicry and theatrical skills. He led the cultural team of MSRIT and won the VTU Cultural festival 2009 held in SBMJCE. He was awarded the Best outgoing student (Best Achiever) from the mechanical department in 2009.

After a brief stint in Accenture as a software engineer, he decided to pursue his passion in the entertainment industry. He did his master's degree in Media & Communication from Symbiosis School of Media & Communication. He topped the college in final semester in 2012.

== Career ==
=== Actor ===
Narahalli made his silver screen debut as actor and lyricist in Sundaranga Jaana (2016). He essayed the role of Gungru, friend of the protagonist Lucky, played by Golden star Ganesh. The movie was directed by veteran actor & director Ramesh Aravind. The movie was produced by well known producers from south Indian cinema, Rockline Venkatesh and Allu Aravind under their respective banners. The movie was a laugh riot and was declared a hit. The satellite rights of the movie was sold to Udaya TV.

He is also part of a theatre group called Rangasiri which is active from 2002. His role as 'Ujju' in a play called "Matryoshka" has garnered wide appreciation from the audience.

=== Lyricist ===
He made his debut as a lyricist for Kannada Cinema in Sundaranga Jaana in which he penned two songs Kalkondbitte & Fly Fly. B. Ajaneesh Loknath was the music composer for the album. The song 'Kalkondbitte' became a superhit romantic melody song and is included in various playlists of music sites like Saavn, Gaana & Raaga.

His song "Kannane" from the movie Srikanta was sung by century star Dr. Shivarajkumar. He wrote lyrics for Manasu Malligey (2017) the official remake of the Marathi blockbuster movie Sairat. Sairat's music was retained in the Kannada version. Sairat Zala Ji was recreated as Thangaliya Roopa which was widely appreciated by the Kannada audience.

His latest songs "Dandamdashagunam" and "Amma Nannamma" are from the movie Bruhaspathi (2018) directed by Nanda Kishore and music composed by V. Harikrishna. Songs were widely appreciated by media and audience.

He has also penned lyrics for small screen non-fiction shows like Suvarna Super Jodi (2013), Suvarna Parivaar Awards (2013) and Khiladi Kutumba (2017).

=== RJ ===
Narahalli an RJ in Nammradio, Kannada's first international online radio. Nammradio reaches out to listeners across 196 countries. He is known for his shows like ‘Punyaatmaru’, a show based on satire and ‘Bisi Bhale Bath’, a cookery show.

=== Television ===
He started his TV career in Star Suvarna as an executive producer but his role in the extended from script & talkback to content direction, voice-overs & commentary to anchoring, designing marketing strategies to executing them on the ground. He made full use of the free hand given to him and grew as a technician.

His first major project was a weekend game show called Suvarna Super Jodi (2013). This show along with Kannadada Kotyadhipathi 2 and fiction shows propelled Star Suvarna to become the No.1 channel in Karnataka beating the 19-year old leadership of Udaya TV.

He started scripting and directing on-ground events like Suvarna Sambhrama, Suvarna Samagama and Suvarna Parivaar awards.

He made his small screen debut as an anchor in Suvarna Comedy Awards, 2013 and co-hosted the show with the famous anchor Anushree and RJ Nikhil Swamy. His major break came in 2014, when he did the script and talkback for Kiccha Sudeep in Bigg Boss Season 2 which was shot in Lonavala, Pune. The show was a bigger success than its previous season in terms of TV Ratings.

After Bigg Boss, he started writing screenplay and dialogues for Khushi, a fiction show which was the remake of the Hindi superhit serial 'Iss pyaar ko kya naam doon Ek baar Phir'.

Later in his career, Narahalli shifted to Zee Kannada where he was made a name for himself as a creative writer. He has been designing content and scripting for all the reality shows and events telecasted in Zee Kannada. Weekend with Ramesh, SaReGaMaPa, Drama Juniors and Comedy Khiladigalu are the famous non-fiction brands which he has been an integral part of. Mega-events like Zee Kutumba Awards, Zee Dashakada Sambhrama, Zee Jaathre and other major events in Zee Kannada have had his script and direction.

Jodi Hakki Maduve Receptionnu shot in Pandavapura, Mandya was produced and directed by Narahalli, through his partner company Blitz Creatives. The show was aired on 30 July 2017 and got a TVR of 5.4.

He was one of the expert panelists in the discussion held by Suddi TV program called Akhaada, wherein the topic of discussion was – "Do TV shows promote casteism in society?". He was lauded for his sensible presentation of his viewpoints.

Amongst the various roles he has played in television, Pradyumna is mainly known for his skills in talkback and script for events and reality shows. He has done script and talkback for Kiccha Sudeep (in Bigg Boss Season 2), Ramesh Aravind (Weekend with Ramesh Season 2 & Season 3), Anushree (SaReGaMaPa Season 12 & Season 13, Zee Jathre & Zee Kutumba Awards), Master Anand (Drama Juniors Season 1 & Season 2), Vijay Raghavendra (Zee Kutumba Awards), Srujan Lokesh (Kannada Chalanachitra Cup - Launch Event), Shalini & Arun Sagar (Zee Kutumba Awards).

== Personal life ==
Pradyumna lost his father Mr Somesh Narahalli during Covid and has ever since taken over his father's business V R Traders, a wholesale food store in the business hub of Bengaluru, K R Market.

He is also the creative head and partner of Blitz Creatives, a creative agency based in Bengaluru. He also works as a freelancer in Kannada films and television.

== Lyrics Chart ==
Year	Title	Film / Album	Music director	Singers	Source
2016	"Kalkondbitte"	Sundaranga Jaana	B. Ajaneesh Loknath	Haricharan	
2016	"Fly Fly"	Sundaranga Jaana	B. Ajaneesh Loknath	Lavanya & Shashank	
2016	"Hello Future Ganda"	Sundaranga Jaana	B. Ajaneesh Loknath	Lavanya & Shashank	
2017	"Kannane"	Srikanta	B. Ajaneesh Loknath	Shiva Rajkumar & Bobby	
2017	"Thangaliya Roopa"	Manasu Malligey	Ajay–Atul	Chinmayee & Ajay	
2018	"Dhandam Dashagunam"	Bruhaspathi	V. Harikrishna	Ranjith & Team	
2018	"Amma Nannamma"	Bruhaspathi	V. Harikrishna	K. S. Chithra & Pankaj	
2018	"Ee Sala Cup Namdhe"	RCB Fan Anthem	Sangeetha Rajeev	Sangeetha Rajeev	
2018	"All these Feelings"	BMS	BMS	Deepak Doddera & Sire	
2018	"Nan e life"	Zindagi	Sangeetha Rajeev	Sangeetha Rajeev	
2019	"Lakshmi Baramma"	Gini Helida Kathe	Hithan Hassan	Damodar Naik, Pragathi, Prabhu, Hithan Hassan	
2020	"You're My Love"	YML	Sangeetha Rajeev	Sangeetha Rajeev	
2020	"Thank U Ma"	Thank U Ma	Sangeetha Rajeev	Sangeetha Rajeev	
2020	"Badalagu Neenu"	Badalagu Neenu Badalayisu Neenu	V. Harikrishna	Vijay Prakash, Rajesh Krishnan & Santosh Venky	
2020	"WedLock Down"	Wedlock Down	Sangeetha Rajeev	Sangeetha Rajeev, Vasu Dixit	
2020	"Ena Madali"	Ena Madali	Sangeetha Rajeev	Sangeetha Rajeev	
2020	"Sugar Sugar"	Butterfly	Amit Trivedi	Karthik	
2021	"Appa"	Appa	Sangeetha Rajeev	Sangeetha Rajeev	
2021	"Noda Noda"	Noda Noda	Sangeetha Rajeev	Sangeetha Rajeev	
2022	"Lovvu Lovvu"	Lovvu Lovvu	Sangeetha Rajeev	Sangeetha Rajeev	
2022	"Raymo Faymo"	Raymo	Arjun Janya	Sanjith Hegde	
2022	"Mayanagari"	Dollu	Ananth Kamath M	Sagar Puranik	
2024	"Kuvari Jawari"	Kuvari Jawari	Ultra Beats	Rakesh Chatra	

== Filmography ==
Year	Film	Character	Director	Producer	Source
2016	Sundaranga Jaana	Gungru	Ramesh Aravind	Rockline Venkatesh & Allu Arvind	
2019	Pailwaan	Doctor	Krishna	Swapna Krishna	
