= Padmanabhanagar =

Padmanabhanagara
- Neighbourhood
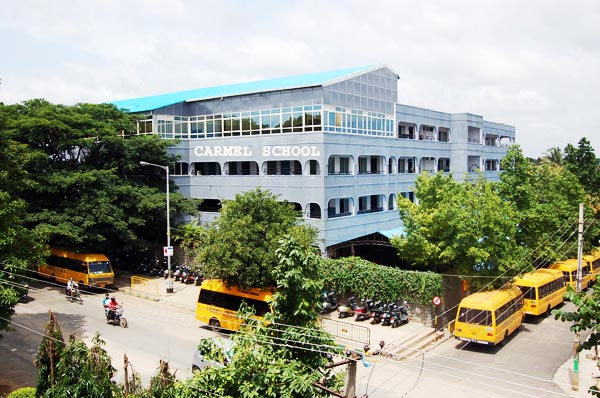
- Carmel School

- Location within Bengaluru
- Coordinates: 12.9155°N 77.5584°E
- Country: India
- State: Karnataka
- District: Bangalore Urban
- Metropolitan City: Bangalore
- Zone: Bangalore South
- Ward: 182

Languages
  - Official: Kannada
- Time zone: UTC+5:30 (IST)
- PIN: 560070
- MP: Tejasvi Surya
- Lok Sabha constituency: Bangalore South
- Vidhan Sabha constituency: Padmanabhanagar
- MLA: R. Ashoka

Padmanabhanagar is a posh residential locality in South Bangalore, India, covering an area of 1.68 km^{2}. It is under the jurisdiction of the Greater Bengaluru Authority. Padmanabhanagar has a famous park called the Lakshmikantha Park, which houses the Lakshmikantha temple. In 2018, the corporator allotted funds and developed it further. The park was eyed for its medicinal trees and was sanctioned to be cut down completely and set up a landscaped area but the senior citizens of the locality who nurtured the park protested and prevented it. It is surrounded by Kumaraswamy Layout, Gowdanapalya, Chennamanakere, Kathriguppe, Kadirenahalli, Uttarahalli and Chikkakalasandra.

It is a constituency in the Karnataka legislative assembly. The assembly constituency has several areas surrounding Padmanabhanagara like Kumaraswamy Layout, Yediyur, Tyagarajanagara, Banashankari 2nd stage, Yarab Nagara, parts of Banashankari temple ward, Jayanagara 6th/7th/8th blocks, Shastri Nagara. The constituency is currently represented by Shri R Ashoka (Bharathiya Janata Party). Padmanabhanagara is also a ward constituency in BBMP (Bruhat Bengaluru Mahanagara Palike ward No. 182) which was represented by Smt. L Shobha Anjanappa of BJP (Bharathiya Janata Party), in the immediate past term.

== Education ==
Among its educational institutions are:

- Carmel English School
- Prarthana School
- Deccan International School
- Sri Kumarans Children's home(SKCH) Composite PU college
- Jnana Vijnana Vidya Peeta

== Health ==
- Maharaja Agrasen Hospital (Bangalore)
- D.G Hospital
- Yogananda Multi Speciality Hospital
- Motherhood (opposite KIMS)
- Agarwal Eye Hospital
- Medall Clumax Diagnostics
- Hillside Hospital

== Notable residents ==
- H.D. Deve Gowda, Janata Dal (Secular) leader and former Prime Minister of India

== Transport ==
The area is well connected by the BMTC bus network.

- Bus routes to Kempegowda Bus Terminus include 12B, 12C, 210N, 210NA, 210NB, 210ND, 210NF, 210P, 210J, 210KA, 210W, 210I.
- Bus routes to KR Market include 15A, 210N, 210NA.
- Bus routes to Shivajinagara include 13B, 182, 210H.
- Bus route to Bhoopasandra - 279F.
- Bus route to Kamala Nagara BEML Layout - TR-10 (210N-96D)
- The nearest Namma Metro station is Banashankari (on the Green line).
