= Sinnga (film) =

2019 Kannada action-drama thriller film by Vijay Kiran

Singha
- Theatrical release poster
- Directed by: Vijay Kiran
- Based on: Kutti Puli by M. Muthaiah
- Produced by: Uday K. Mehta
- Starring: Chiranjeevi Sarja; Aditi Prabhudeva; P. Ravi Shankar
- Cinematography: Kiran Hampapur
- Edited by: Ganedh Mallaiah
- Music by: Dharma Vish
- Production companies: UKM Studios; Uday K Mehta Productions
- Release date: 19 July 2019
- Country: India
- Language: Kannada

Singha (transl. Lion) is a 2019 Kannada-language masala film directed by Vijay Kiran and produced by Uday K. Mehta. The film stars Chiranjeevi Sarja, alongside Aditi Prabhudeva, Tara, P. Ravi Shankar, Aruna Balraj and Shivaraj K. R. Pete. It is a remake of Tamil film Kutti Puli. The music was composed by Dharma Vish, while cinematography and editing were handled by Kiran Hampapur and Ganedh Mallaiah.

Sinnga was released on 19 July 2019 to mixed reviews from critics.

== Plot ==
Sinnga, a rogue who fights against injustice, lives with his mother Janakamma and his friend Havali. Sinnga meets Geetha, who misunderstands him, but later understands his kind nature and develops feelings for him. Rudra, an assassin, is hired by an MP to finish an assignment, but his attempts are unknowingly thwarted by Sinnga. One day, Sinnga gets attacked by Rudra's brother and is admitted to the hospital. Geetha and Janakamma arrange the money for his treatment and Sinnga recovers.

Meanwhile, Geetha's father learns about Sinnga and Geetha's relationship and seeks Rudra's help in dealing with Sinnga. Rudra warns Kutti Puli, but Sinnga thrashes Rudra and humiliates him in front of everyone, which determines Rudra to avenge the humiliation by killing Sinnga. Sinnga learns about Janakamma's sacrifices for his well-being, due to which Sinnga decide to lead a life free from violence and accepts Geetha's love. Rudra sends his men to attack Sinnga, but Sinnga escapes.

Janakamma learns about the attack from Havali and seeks forgiveness from those, who were thrashed by Sinnga. Janakamma leaves for Rudra's house to seek forgiveness, while Sinnga learns that Janakamma is in Rudra's house from Havali and leaves to save her. After a battle with Rudra's goons, which ends with the death of Rudra's brother. Sinnga reaches Rudra's house, only to find that Janakamma has killed Rudra as he would not spare Sinnga.

== Cast ==
- Chiranjeevi Sarja as Sinnga
- Aditi Prabhudeva as Geetha
- Ravi Shankar as Rudraswamy
- Tara as Janakamma, Sinnga's mother
- Aruna Balraj as Janakamma's sister
- Shivaraj K. R. Pete as Hawali, Sinnga's friend
- Ravi Bhat as Geetha's father
- B. Suresha as a minister

== Soundtrack ==
Sinnga

Soundtrack album by Dharma Vish
- Released: 9 July 2019
- Recorded: 2019
- Genre: Feature film soundtrack
- Length: 23:16
- Language: Kannada
- Label: Anand Audio
External audio
- Official Audio Jukebox on YouTube

The soundtrack was composed by Dharma Vish.

Track listing
No.	Title	Lyrics	Singer(s)	Length
1.	"Shaane Top Agavle"	Chethan Kumar	Vijay Prakash	3:48
2.	"What A Beautifullu"	Kaviraj	Naveen Sajju, Meghana Raj	4:15
3.	"Putta Putta Aase"	Kaviraj	Anuradha Bhat	3:55
4.	"Amma Amma Ammaa"	V. Nagendra Prasad	Prem	4:03
5.	"Aata Haaku"	Chethan Kumar	Shashank Sheshagiri	3:51
6.	"Shaane Top Agavle"	Chethan Kumar	Sangeetha Rajeev	3:24
Total length:				23:16

== Release ==
The film was theatrically released on 19 July 2019.

== Reception ==
=== Critical response ===
A. Sharadhaa of Cinema Express gave 3/5 stars and wrote "Sinnga is not a smart action movie, but just a routine commercial entertainer for the masses." Vinay Lokesh of The Times of India gave 2.5/5 stars and wrote "Sinnga could be one-time watch for those who love mass films."
