= Cleanfeed =

Cleanfeed may refer to:

== Technology ==
- Cleanfeed (content blocking system), an Internet blocking system in the United Kingdom and Canada
- Clean feed, or mix-minus a sound reproduction technique
- Clean feed (TV), a television video signal without keys
  - Clean feed, a backhaul feed in TV and radio broadcasting

== Other ==
- Clean Feed Records, a Portuguese record label
