= Manoranjan Ravichandran =

Indian Kannada film actor (born 1987)

- Born: 11 December 1987 (age 38)
- Occupation: Actor
- Years active: 2017–present
- Father: V. Ravichandran
- Relatives: N. Veeraswamy (grandfather)

Manoranjan Ravichandran is an Indian actor who appears in Kannada films.

The son of Kannada film star actor-director V. Ravichandran, Manoranjan made his debut with the Kannada film Saheba (2017), directed by Bharath, which was released to mixed reviews, but earned him good reviews.

== Early and personal life ==
Manoranjan Ravichandran was born to Kannada actor and director V. Ravichandran and Sumathy. He has a sister Geethanjali and a brother Vikram. He is a grandson of notable South Indian film producer N. Veeraswamy.

Manoranjan has attended acting classes at Abhinaya Tharanga and was trained by A S Murthy's daughter. He has learnt dance in Chennai and martial arts in Bangalore. His initial interest was in Cricket which he wanted to shape up as his career. He played tournaments at the district level and was about to play at the state level when he met with a hand injury. He eventually landed up in films and took up his father's production film.

== Film career ==
Manoranjan's film career took off after his father actor V. Ravichandran announced his project titled Premalokadalli Ranadheera in 2014. He had mentioned to direct the new film after completing his film Manjina Hani. However in 2015, it was reported that this film was indefinitely postponed and he would not direct the film. It was also reported that director Bharath would instead direct the film with Manoranjan as lead. The project was finalized in 2016 and titled as Saheba. The film released in August 2017 and received mixed reviews with critics praising his performance as a promising one. His next film was with director Nanda Kishore for the Rockline Venkatesh's production titled Brihaspathi. The film was a remake of Tamil film Velaiilla Pattadhari (2014) in which he reprises the role played by actor Dhanush. The film was released on 5 January 2018.

== Filmography ==
Key
†	Denotes films that have not yet been released

Year	Film	Role	Notes
2017	Saheba	Mano	Nominated—SIIMA Award for Best Debutant Actor in a Leading Role (Male) – Kannada
2018	Brihaspathi	Sudhir	
2021	Mugilpete	Raja	
2022	Prarambha	Manthan	
TBA	Ranadheera-Premalokadalli†	TBA	Delayed
