= Meghave Meghave =

- Directed by: V. Nagendra Prasad
- Produced by: H.B. Raghukumar
- Starring: Gracy Singh; Ram
- Cinematography: Dasari Seenu
- Edited by: K.M. Prakash
- Music by: V. Harikrishna
- Release date: 30 January 2009
- Country: India
- Language: Kannada

Meghave Meghave (transl. Clouds, oh clouds) is a 2009 Kannada-language romance film directed by V. Nagendra Prasad starring Gracy Singh and Ram. The film was released on 30 January 2009.

== Cast ==
- Gracy Singh as Charmi / Chandramukhi
- Ram as Raja
- Sudeepa (Guest Appearance)
- Ravi
- Chethan
- Gururaj Hosakote
- Shobaraj
- Karibasavaiah
- Mandya Ramesh

== Soundtrack ==
The film features background score and soundtrack composed by V. Harikrishna and lyrics by V. Nagendra Prasad.

Meghave Meghave

Soundtrack album by V. Harikrishna
- Genre: Feature film soundtrack
- Language: Kannada

Track-list
No.	Title	Singer(s)	Length
1.	"Yava Deshada"	L. N. Shastry
2.	"Nin Tutige Ondsala"	Udit Narayan, Anuradha Sriram
3.	"Maniyaga Yaru Illa"	V. Nagendra Prasad
4.	"Huduga Huduga"	Bombay Jayashri
5.	"Hey Neela Gagana"	Vani Harikrishna
6.	"Bellanna Biliyettu"	Hemanth Kumar, Ganesh, Shashank Sheshagiri, Sangeetha
7.	"Aa Surya Bandaga"	Shankar Mahadevan

== Reception ==
R G Vijayasarathy of Rediff.com scored the film at 1 out of 5 stars and said "Hari Krishna's music is not in the league of his recent films like Ambari, Payana and Junglee. Dasari Seenu's photography shows glimpses of class while capturing the Nepal outdoor spots. In a nutshell, you can afford to give Meghave Meghave a miss."

Sify wrote "There are three melodious tunes scored by V Harikrishna. Namasthe Namasthe? opening song, Soorya Bandhaga?.and Huduga Huduga?. are good numbers. Cinematography ought to be pleasant to the eyes because the locations of Nepal are fresh to the Kannada audience."

A critic from The New Indian Express wrote "Surprisingly, composer Hari Krishna doesn't live up to his reputation with "Huduga Huduga" being the only song that has some popular appeal. Dasari Seenu's cinematography isn't spectacular and Nagendra Prasad fails even as a dialogue writer. "Meghave Meghave" is a below average film".
