= Maharaja Agrasen Hospital (Bengaluru) =

Medical college in Karnataka, India

Maharaja Agrasen Hospital in Bangalore, India, situated in 15 Main, 17 Cross, Padmanabhanagar, South Bangalore, Karnataka – 560070, near Shanimahathma Temple It is a multi-speciality hospital built in the year 2001 The hospital is also listed under Practo.

== History ==
Maharaja Agrasen Hospital has been so named because Maharaja Agrasen was a noble king of Agroha (Haryana) in whose heart, the welfare of his subject was the super most. In his kingdom, education and medical facilities were free to everyone irrespective of caste, religion, race and sex etc.

Maharaja Agrasen Hospital (MAH)
- Address: Agrawal Seva Samiti, 15th Main Road, 17th Cross, Banashankari 2'nd Stage, Behind Kidney Foundation, Padmanabhanagar
- Location: Bangalore, Karnataka
- Website: https://agrasenhospital.com/

== Services ==
The hospital provides numerous health services starting from Extensor Tendon Repair, endoscopy to fissurectomy, biopsy, X- Ray, Anthroscopy, Diabetes Management etc. Also Open and Laproscopic Hernia surgery is conducted here. Hospital Services are listed here :

- Heart Conditions
- Gastroenterologist
- Chest Pain Treatment
- Urology
- Cardiology
- Diabetology
- Consultation
- Child Specialist
- Grommet Insertion
- General Pediatrics
- Clinical Cardiology
- General dermatology
- Preventive Medicine
- Bone Tumor Treatment
- Ent Checkup (General)
- Paediatric Healthcare
- Uncontrolled Diabetes
- Viral Fever Treatment
- Dengue Fever Treatment
- Skin Disease Treatment
- Treatment For Bone Fracture
- Treatment For Diabetes Management
- Treatment For Obstetrics Problems
- Treatment For Diseases in Pregnancy

The hospital is aiming at opening new departments like IVF (In Vitro Fertilization) and Oncology Healthcare Unit.

== Facilities ==
The hospital has a dialysis facility.

In December 2005, the hospital offered a free diabetes camp.

The below list of facilities are available here.

- EEG
- TMT
- X-ray
- CT Scan
- ECG
- PFT
- ECHO
- Mammogram
- Color Doppler
- Ultrasound
- Endoscopy

== Rates ==
Rates for Hospital Wards at Maharaja Agrasen Hospital varies from approximately Rs 1150/- to Rs 5000/- varying from General Ward, Semi-Private Ward (Twin sharing), Private Ward (both Non-AC & Deluxe Room) to Suite Room. The Hospital conducts several tests and rates are approximately :

Blood Sugar Test	Rs. 60.00
Blood Group Test	Rs. 75.00
Liver Function Test (LFT)	Rs. 450.00
Thyroid Test	Rs. 350.00
Urine Routine	Rs. 75.00
Stool Routine	Rs. 150.00
HIV Test	Rs. 250.00
ICU	Rs. 5000.00 (Bed Charges, Nursing)
ICU	Rs. 10000.00 (Approx. One Day Expense, For Ventilator Patient)
Glucose Tolerance Test (GTT)	Rs. 200.00
HbA1C Test	Rs. 400.00
FSH (Follicle Stimulating Hormone) Test	Rs. 300.00
Alkaline Phosphatase (ALP) Test	Rs. 75.00
Calcium Test	Rs. 70.00
Chloride Test	Rs. 100.00
Prolactin Test	Rs. 300.00
TSH (Thyroid Stimulating Hormone) Test	Rs. 250.00
T3 (Triiodothyronine) Test	Rs. 250.00
T4 (Thyroxine) Test	Rs. 250.00
LDL Cholesterol	Rs. 100.00
Phosphorus Test	Rs. 125.00
Potassium Test	Rs. 100.00
SGOT Test	Rs. 100.00
SGPT Test	Rs. 100.00
Sodium Test	Rs. 150.00
Cholesterol Test	Rs. 100.00
Creatinine Test	Rs. 75.00
Triglycerides Test	Rs. 100.00
VLDL Test	Rs. 100.00
VDRL Test	Rs. 60.00
CBC / Hemogram Test	Rs. 125.00
Platelet Count	Rs. 100.00
Bleeding / Clotting Time Test	Rs. 30.00
Total Protein Test	Rs. 60.00
Uric Acid Test	Rs. 75.00
Widal Test	Rs. 100.00
Blood Urea Nitrogen Test	Rs. 75.00
HBsAg Test	Rs. 150.00
Urea Test	Rs. 75.00
Pregnancy Test	Rs. 100.00
Electrolytes Test	Rs. 300.00
PCV (Packed Cell Volume) Test	Rs. 125.00
Hemoglobin (Hb) Test	Rs. 75.00
