= Srikanta (2017 film) =

2017 Indian Kannada-language action thriller film

- Directed by: Manju Swaraj
- Written by: Manju Swaraj
- Based on: Skhalana by Nagathihalli Chandrashekar
- Produced by: M. S. Manu Gowda
- Starring: Shiva Rajkumar; Chandini Sreedharan
- Cinematography: B. Sureshbabu
- Edited by: Deepu S. Kumar
- Music by: B. Ajaneesh Loknath
- Production company: Mahashaila Cinebandha
- Release date: 6 January 2017
- Running time: 138 minutes
- Country: India
- Language: Kannada
- Budget: ₹6 crore

Srikanta is a 2017 Indian Kannada-language romantic action drama film directed by Manju Swaraj and produced by M. S. Manu Gowda under the banner Mahashaila Cinebandha. Based on the 2-page short story Skhalana by Nagathihalli Chandrashekar which was published in 1985 in the weekly Kannada magazine Taranga, the film features Shiva Rajkumar and Chandini Sreedharan in the lead roles, while Vijay Raghavendra, Achyuth Kumar and Raj Deepak Shetty appear in supporting roles.

Srikanta was released on 6 January 2017 and was a commercial success at the box office.

== Plot ==
Due to an ongoing strike about the political scams in Karnataka, Srikantha offers a ride to a reporter named Tarun who wants to go to Agumbe. Tarun asks about Srikanta's background and lifestyle, where Srikanta reveals his past.

Past: Srikanta and his friends does odd jobs for politicians. In order to defeat MLA Devaraj out of spite, Devaraj's PA Prabhu plans on running an equally popular humble social worker Satyamurthy, who also serves the public directly. Prabhu asks for Srikanta's help to spread publicity about the candidate. Srikanta obliges after payment, where he moves promotions to full swing. Shashi asks Srikanta for help as some goons acted inappropriately with her friend and took illicit photos.

Srikanta destroys the photos and later finds out that Shashi run an ashram for physically challenged children and is also collecting donations. Srikanta rounds many locals and asks them to volunteer for organ donation after they pass to help the children of the ashram. This pleases Shashi and makes her develops feelings for Srikanta, but Srikanta rejects her and tells that his lifestyle is not for her and it is her mistake to love him. Despite this, Srikanta and Shashi marry, but Srikanta does not change as Shashi had hoped even after she becomes pregnant.

Meanwhile, Satyamurthy is growing more and more popular against Devaraj. To bolster even more support, Srikanta is asked to bring more people to stage a publicity stunt. Srikanta's friends denies to volunteer, but one of his friends named Arundathi agrees to volunteer. As part of the stunt, gasoline is poured with no intention to actually light a fire. Despite this, someone lights a fire and quickly escapes, which shocks Srikanta as Arundathi is now dead. After seeing Prabhu escaping from the crowd, Srikanta tries to kill Prabhu, but Prabhu reveals that Satyamurthy had caused the burnings as he had been acting as a ruse of a humble person and was actually vying for a political seat for the whole time.

Srikanta tries to expose Satyamurthy, but realizes that Satyamurthy is almost untouchable at this point. Additionally, Shashi leaves Srikanta, but Srikanta barely convinces her to rejoin him and they bond with each other and their imminent child. Satyamurthy targets the ashram as it is a prime real estate, where he kicks out the ashram's head Subbanna and the residents. Srikanta and Prabhu plan a sting operation on the top political candidates, including Devaraj and Satyamurthy, causing the government to implode. As they prepare to deliver the evidence, Srikanta gets a call from Satyamurthy, who has kidnapped Shashi. Srikanta saves Shashi and a fight ensues while the evidence is being aired on all the news channels. Shashi and Srikanta barely escape from Satyamurthy, where the public joins and thrashes Satyamurthy to death.

Present: Srikanta and Tarun arrive at Shashi's village, where many people are waiting. Srikanta opens the trunk and collect Shashi's dead corpse so that Shashi's parents can mourn, shocking Tarun. Srikanta and Tarun leave and continue their journey to Agumbe. Srikanta reveals that Satyamurthy had actually landed a swing on Shashi's womb. Despite Srikanta rushing Shashi via ambulance, the ambulance was struck by the riots which Srikanta himself had caused and Shashi died in the ambulance. Despite feeling the pain and sorrow due to his undoing, Srikanta finds solace in knowing that Shashi is always with him.

== Cast ==
- Shiva Rajkumar as Srikanta
- Chandini Sreedharan as Shashi
- Vijay Raghavendra as Tarun, press reporter
- H. G. Dattatreya as Subbanna
- Achyuth Kumar as Prabhu, Devaraj's PA
- Bullet Prakash as Brahmananda Swamiji
- Deepak Shetty as Satyamurthy
- Chi. Guru Dutt as MLA Devaraj
- Anil Kumar as Satyamurthy's henchman
- Manjunath Gowda
- Sparsha Rekha in an extended cameo as Srikanta's friend

== Soundtrack ==
Srikanta

Soundtrack album by B. Ajaneesh Loknath
- Released: 17 December 2016
- Recorded: 2016
- Genre: Feature film soundtrack
- Length: 17:56
- Label: Junglee Music

B. Ajaneesh Loknath chronology
Sundaranga Jaana (2016)	Srikanta (2016)	Kurangu Bommai (2017)

The background score and soundtrack of the film was composed by B. Ajaneesh Loknath. The soundtrack album consists of five tracks. It has lyrics penned by Prof. Krishne Gowda, Pradyumna Narahalli, Chethan Kumar and V. Nagendra Prasad. The album was released on 17 December 2017.

Track listing
No.	Title	Lyrics	Singer(s)	Length
1.	"Kaalittare Yuddhane"	Prof. Krishne Gowda	Hemanth, Shashank Sheshagiri, Chintan Vikas	4:07
2.	"Ondondsari"	Prof. Krishne Gowda	Karthik, Shilpa Srikanth	3:19
3.	"Kannane Kannane"	Pradyumna Narahalli, Chethan Kumar	Shiva Rajkumar, Bobby	3:54
4.	"Antharangada Aase"	V. Nagendra Prasad	Shashank Sheshagiri	4:20
5.	"Shiva Shiva Maharaja"		Hemanth Kumar, Shashank Sheshagiri, Chintan Vikas	2:16
Total length:				17:56

== Reception ==
=== Critical response ===
S. Shyam Prasad of Bangalore Mirror gave 3.5/5 stars and wrote "Manju Swaraj who had shown his good grip on narrating a story in films like Shravani Subramanya has one more winner on his hands. Srikanta has a simple enough storyline, but a superbly charted screenplay makes it engaging and entertaining." Sunayana Suresh of The Times of India gave 3/5 stars and wrote "The film doesn't go jingoistic and play to the gallery like Shankar's films that touch upon such topics of social reforms, but is rather subdued in its style".
