= Uday K. Mehta =

Indian Film producer

Uday K. Mehta is an Indian Film producer and writer who works in Kannada cinema.

== Career ==
Mehta started his career as a film producer in 2009 with his film Ravana. After this he produced a Kannada film Krishnan Love Story in 2010. The film was a box office hit.

In 2013 Mehta produced Bachchan, starring Sudeep, Jagapathi Babu and Bhavana, and in 2016, he produced another Kannada romantic film Krishna-Rukku.

In 2019. Uday Mehta produced Brahmachari, a comedy-drama film starring Sathish Ninasam and Aditi Prabhudeva. He also wrote the script for this film. Brahmachari is the sequel to Mehta's 2014 Kannada film Love in Mandya. In the same year Mehta produced Sinnga starring Chiranjeevi Sarja, Aditi Prabhudeva.

== Filmography ==
Year	Film	Comments
2009	Ravana	Producer
2010	Krishnan Love Story	Producer
2013	Bachchan	Producer
2014	Love in Mandya	Producer
2015	Raja Rajendra	Producer
2016	Krishna-Rukku	Producer
2019	Sinnga	Producer
2019	Brahmachari	Producer and writer
2024	Martin	Producer
