= Mugilpete =

Kannada-language film

- Official poster
- Directed by: Bharat S Navunda
- Produced by: Raksha; Vijay Kumar
- Starring: Manoranjan Ravichandran; Kayadu Lohar
- Music by: V. Sridhar
- Release date: 19 November 2021
- Country: India
- Language: Kannada

Mugilpete is a 2021 Indian Kannada-language romantic drama film directed by Bharat S Navunda and starring Manoranjan Ravichandran and Kayadu Lohar.

== Plot ==
Raja and Apoorva, a young couple fall in love and wishes to get married. However, they learn their families share different ideologies when it comes to love.

== Cast ==
- Manoranjan Ravichandran as Raja
- Kayadu Lohar as Apoorva
- Tara
- Avinash
- Sadhu Kokila
- Rangayana Raghu
- Prashanth Siddi
- Cockroach Sudhi
- Rishi (cameo appearance)

== Reception ==
A critic from The Times of India wrote that "Should you watch Mugil Pete? If you're a fan of old school commercial entertainers, then this one might be right up your alley". A. Sharadhaa of The New Indian Express opined that "If you are one of those who like leisurely-paced romantic entertainers, Mugil Pete is for you". Prathibha Joy of OTT Play said that "Mugilpete is all about maintaining relationships, whether it is between friends, siblings, lovers or parents and their children – it’s a little old-school, but if this is your cup of tea, go ahead and have it". Vivek M. V. of Deccan Herald said that "'Mugilpete' fails to generate sensible arguments on arranged and love marriages. That is because the director wants the film to be a star debut vehicle for Manuranjan."
