= The Judgement (2024 film) =

- Theatrical release poster
- Directed by: Gururaj Kulkarni
- Written by: Gururaj Kulkarni (Story, screenplay); M. S. Ramesh (Dialogues)
- Produced by: Sharad B Nadagoud; Vishwanath Gupta; Ramu Raichur; Rajshekar Patil; Pratima Biradar
- Starring: V Ravichandran; Diganth Manchale; Meghana Gaonkar; Lakshmi Gopalaswamy
- Cinematography: P. K. H. Das
- Edited by: Kemparaju B. S.
- Music by: Anoop Seelin
- Production companies: G9 Communication Media and Entertainment
- Distributed by: Reliance Entertainment
- Release date: 24 May 2024
- Country: India
- Language: Kannada

The Judgement is a 2024 Indian Kannada-language legal thriller film written and directed by Gururaj Kulkarni and produced by G9 Communication Media and Entertainment. The film features V Ravichandran in the lead advocate role besides Diganth Manchale, Meghana Gaonkar, Dhanya Ramkumar, Lakshmi Gopalaswamy and Ravishankar Gowda in pivotal roles. The film's score and soundtrack are composed by Anoop Seelin, while the cinematography is by PKH Das, with editing by Kemparaju B. S.

The film released on 24 May 2024.

== Premise ==
The film features a protagonist who seeks justice within the legal framework. Even when faced with challenges, he remains committed to finding solutions within the system, rather than resorting to vigilante actions.

== Cast ==
- V Ravichandran as Advocate Govind Prasad
- Diganth Manchale as Anil Kumar
- Meghana Gaonkar
- Dhanya Ramkumar
- Lakshmi Gopalaswamy
- T. S. Nagabharana
- Prakash Belawadi
- Ravishankar Gowda
- Rangayana Raghu
- Sujay Shastry
- Krishna Hebbale
- Rajendra Karanth
- Balaji Manohar
- Rekha Kudligi
- Navila Jo
- Seetha Kote
- Roopa Rayappa as Roopa
- Master Surya
