= Rathaavara =

2015 film by Chandrashekhar Bandiyappa

- Directed by: Chandrashekar Bandiyappa
- Written by: Chandrashekar Bandiyappa
- Produced by: Dharmashree Manjunath N.
- Starring: Sriimurali; Rachita Ram
- Cinematography: Bhuvan Gowda
- Edited by: Srikanth Gowda
- Music by: Dharma Vish
- Production company: Dharmashree Enterprises
- Release date: 4 December 2015
- Running time: 131 minutes
- Country: India
- Language: Kannada

Rathaavara is a 2015 Indian Kannada-language action thriller film written and directed by Chandrashekar Bandiyappa and produced by Dharmashree Manjunath. It stars Sri Murali and Rachita Ram in the lead roles, while the supporting cast features P. Ravi Shankar, Chikkanna, Sadhu Kokila and Charan Raj. The music was composed by Dharma Vish and cinematography by Bhuvan Gowda.

The principal photography of the film began in December 2014 at locations such as Bangalore, Mysore, Mangalore and Gadag.

Rathaavara was released on 4 December 2015 where it received mixed to positive reviews from critics and became a box office success.

== Plot ==
Ratha is a local hitman who works as a right hand to a gangster-cum-MLA Manikanta. Things are going on good with both of them until Manikanta assigns Ratha an easy yet hesitant task to bring a transgender's body due to spiritual beliefs. Ratha tries to capture and kill a transgender Maadevi, but gets trapped in a quest of unluck and curses by Maadevi and always fails at the works assigned to him, thus earning Manikanta's wrath. Navami is an ambitions photographer who falls in love with Ratha. Though reluctant at first, Ratha agrees. Ratha decide to lead a peaceful life and also donate his one eye to his friend, but Manikanta's henchmen capture Ratha's friends and kills them. Enraged, Ratha finishes Manikanta and his henchmen. However, Maadevi stabs Ratha, who soon dies of his injuries, thus leaving Navami depressed and Maadevi's curse being fulfilled.

== Cast ==
- Sriimurali as Rathavara
- Rachita Ram as Navami
- P. Ravi Shankar as Manikantha
- Saurav Lokesh as Maadevi
- Charan Raj
- Chikkanna
- Sadhu Kokila
- Narendra Babu
- Chitra Shenoy
- Sharath
- Chandru
- Hitesh B.C
- RoopaShree
- Kopplu Puttamma
- Prashanth M
- Dhakshayini
- Triveni
- Chidambaram
- Divya

== Production ==
=== Development ===
The first news about the film was announced by actor Sri Murali in his Twitter account in August 2014. Fresh from the success of his previous venture Ugramm (2014), Murali announced that his next venture would be titled as "Rathaavara" and more details of the film would be revealed in the 150th day celebrations of Ugramm. He also released the first look for the film on the social networking site on his birthday. The film was labelled as an action thriller and would be directed by Chandrashekar Bandiyappa.

=== Casting ===
After signing Murali for the lead protagonist role, the makers roped in actress Rachita Ram who was busy shooting for Ranna. P. Ravi Shankar was roped in to play the main antagonist role.

=== Filming ===
Although the initial reports said the filming to start by October 2014, the actual rolling of the film commenced from December 2014. With the first look of the film out on 17 December 2014, the launch was made a low-key affair with the film's cast and crew members only. The team shot for the film at a brisk pace in and around Mysore. An action sequence was shot at the tourist destination Srirangapatna. Later, it was reported that actor Sri Murali would sing for a track in the film. The climax portions of the film commenced in April 2015 with the actor claiming it to be one of his toughest climaxes shot ever. It was reported that he had to be underwater for close to 12 hours for shooting the climax portions.

== Soundtrack ==
Rathavara

Soundtrack album by Dharma Vish
- Released: 11 November 2015
- Recorded: 2015
- Genre: Feature film soundtrack
- Length: 19:36
- Label: Alpha Digitech

Dharma Vish has composed the soundtrack and score for the film. The soundtrack album consists of five tracks, out of which one has been sung by actor Sri Murali and penned by Yogaraj Bhat. Other lyricist names featured are Kaviraj, Jayanth Kaikini, V. Nagendra Prasad and K. Kalyan. It was released on 11 November 2015, prior to which the makers sought the blessings of Shivakumara Swami in Tumkur.

=== Track listing ===
No.	Title	Lyrics	Singer(s)	Length
1.	"Rathaavara Theme"		Ravindra Soragavi, Dharma Vish	2:08
2.	"Nee Muddada"	Kaviraj	Rajesh Krishnan, Supriya Lohith	4:18
3.	"Hudugi Kannu"	Yogaraj Bhat	Sriimurali	4:04
4.	"Mareyada Pustaka"	Jayanth Kaykini	Anuradha Bhat	4:40
5.	"Preethi Ondu"	K. Kalyan	Ravindra Soragavi	4:26

== Box office ==
The film ran for 100 days on a few screens in Karnataka.
