= Interruptible foldback =

Earpiece to give information to a presenter

Interruptible foldback (IFB), also known as interrupted foldback, interruptible feedback, or interrupt for broadcast, is a monitoring and cueing system used in television, filmmaking, video production, and radio broadcast for one-way communication from the director or assistant director to on-air talent or a remote location. The names are backronyms for the Telex IFB-XXX model line. Less common names for the system include program cue interrupt (PCI) and switched talkback. IFB is often facilitated using an earpiece that on-air persons wear to get cues, feedback or direction from their control rooms. The earpiece itself may also be referred to as an IFB.

The IFB is a special intercom circuit that consists of a mix-minus program feed sent to an earpiece worn by talent via a wire, telephone, or radio receiver (audio that is being "fed back" to talent) that can be interrupted and replaced by a television producer's or director's intercom microphone. On a television news program for example, a producer can talk to the news anchors, to tell them when they are live on the air and when to begin reading off the script on the teleprompter or cue cards. In live television, some news anchors are seen listening to IFBs in order to report breaking news and announcements.

In electronic news gathering (ENG), the IFB can be sent through a telephone hybrid, or some other return link in a broadcast auxiliary service. The physics and design of electronics cause time delays in signals as they travel through wire, fiber optics, or space and when they are converted back and forth from physical sound, electronic signals, radio waves, and from analogue to digital. The latter process and other audio processing can introduce unacceptable delays or echos into the sound. To achieve the mix-minus program to the IFB, certain audio elements that originate remotely from the mix point will be eliminated from the mix that is sent back to the IFB at the remote site to avoid those undesirable effects.

Wired or wireless in-ear monitors (IEMs) may be used to carry the IFB audio to the on-air talent.

== See also ==
- Talkback (television production)
