= Krishna-Rukku =

2016 film by Anil Kumar

Krishna Rukku
- Directed by: Anil Kumar
- Written by: Virinchi Varma
- Produced by: Uday K. Mehta
- Starring: Ajay Rao; Amulya
- Cinematography: Jagadish Wali
- Edited by: K. M. Prakash
- Music by: Sridhar V. Sambhram
- Production company: Vasavi Enterprises
- Distributed by: Mars Distributors; Ramesh Yadav; Ramjagadish Films; Om Sai Release; Ravi Guraddi Combines
- Release date: 26 February 2016
- Country: India
- Language: Kannada

Krishna-Rukku is a 2016 Indian Kannada-language romance film written and directed by Anil Kumar and produced by Uday K. Mehta. It stars Ajay Rao and Amulya in the lead roles. The film's music is composed by Sridhar V. Sambhram and cinematography is by Jagadish Wali.

The official launch of the film commenced in August 2015 in Bangalore. The film is a remake of 2013 Telugu movie Uyyala Jampala.

== Plot ==
Krishna and Rukku are childhood friends who have grown up fighting over minute things. However, they realize they love each other just when they are about to part ways.

== Cast ==
- Ajay Rao as Krishna
- Amulya as Rukku
- Girija Lokesh
- Shobhraj
- Lakshmi Siddaiah
- Swapna Raj
- Lekha Chandra
- Sidhaartha Maadhyamika

=== Development ===
"Krishna-Rukku", the film went on floors with producer Uday K. Mehta roping in actor Ajay Rao for the lead role. After a brief speculation of whether roping Amulya or Radhika for the female lead role, the producer opted for Amulya making a fresh lead pair. A brief photo shoot involving the lead pair and other supporting character artistes was held in Bangalore. Director Anil Kumar of Dilwala fame was chosen to direct the film. Major portions of the shoot got completed in the span of 50 days with song being filmed in Bangkok.

== Soundtrack ==
Sridhar V. Sambhram has composed the score and original soundtrack for the film. A song by the name "Lipstick Olagina" is recorded in the voice of actor Puneeth Rajkumar which is written by Ananda Priya.

=== Track listing ===
No.	Title	Lyrics	Singer(s)	Length
1.	"Helilla Yarallu Naanu"	Jayanth Kaikini	Sonu Nigam, Shreya Ghoshal	4:15
2.	"Lipstick Olagina"	Ananda Priya	Puneeth Rajkumar, Shwetha Prabhu	3:53
3.	"Saaku Saakinnu"	Anil Kumar	Karthik, Anuradha Bhat	4:39
4.	"C for Cow"	Sridhar V. Sambhram	Shashank Sheshagiri, Sangeetha	3:38
5.	"Saaku Saakinnu (female)"	Anil Kumar	Anuradha Bhat	4:20
