= Brahmachari (2019 film) =

- Film poster
- Directed by: Chandra Mohan
- Written by: Chandramohan
- Produced by: Uday K. Mehta
- Starring: Sathish Ninasam; Aditi Prabhudeva
- Cinematography: Ravi.V
- Edited by: Arjun
- Music by: Dharma Vish
- Production company: UKM Studios
- Distributed by: KRG Studios
- Release date: 29 November 2019
- Running time: 134 minutes
- Country: India
- Language: Kannada

Brahmachari is a 2019 Indian Kannada-language comedy drama film written and directed by Chandra Mohan. The film is produced by Uday K. Mehta under the banner UKM Studios. It features Sathish Ninasam and Aditi Prabhudeva. The supporting cast includes Akshatha Srinivas, Shivaraj KR Pete, Ashok, Akanksha, Achyuth Kumar, Padmaja Rao and H. G. Dattatreya. The score and soundtrack for the film is by Dharma Vish and the cinematography is by Ravi.V.

== Cast ==
- Sathish Ninasam as Ram
- Aditi Prabhudeva as Sunitha Krishnamoorthy
- Akshatha Srinivas
- Shivaraj KR Pete
- Ashok
- Akanksha
- Achyuth Kumar
- Padmaja Rao
- H. G. Dattatreya as Dr. Ramdev
- Shille Manjunath

== Production ==
The film was announced on 14 April 2019. The film team had announced Sathish Ninasam as the main lead. Later Aditi Prabhudeva was on board as the female lead. H. G. Dattatreya was approached for a pivotal character in the film. The team later announced that Akshata Srinivas is portraying another important character in the film. The film was shot in and around Bengaluru and Srirangapattana.

== Soundtrack ==
Brahmachari

Soundtrack album by Dharma Vish
- Genre: Feature film soundtrack
- Language: Kannada
- Label: Anand Audio
- Producer: Uday K. Mehta

The film's background score and the soundtracks are composed by Dharma Vish. The music rights were acquired by Ananda Audio.

Tracklist
No.	Title	Lyrics	Singer(s)	Length
1.	"Hidka Hidka"	Chethan Kumar	Naveen Sajju, Pinky Maidasani, Bhargavi Pillai
2.	"Aarambha Aarambha"	V. Nagendra Prasad	Sanjith Hegde, Supriya Lohith
3.	"Sri Ramachamdranu"	V. Nagendra Prasad	Raghu Dixit

== Release and reception ==
The film was released on 29 November 2019. The film met with mixed responses from both audiences and critics and was a commercial failure.

The Times of India gave 3.5/5 and wrote "Bramhachari deals with a serious issue, but never gets preachy. In fact, the performance issues of the protagonist are just the catalyst to a crazy comedy of errors. If you like comedies with that right bit of innuendos and gags, this one might just entertain you."

Bangalore Mirror gave 3/5 and wrote "Brahmachari is not a grand effort of a star vehicle. It depends heavily on the anecdotal comedy that is the staple of sex comedies. The story has been packaged well and is not short of the entertainment quotient. And of course there are the safety nets, in case you need them."
