= Tarakaasura =

2018 film by Chandrashekar Bandiyappa

- Directed by: Chandrashekar Bandiyappa
- Written by: Chandrashekar Bandiyappa
- Screenplay by: Chandrashekar Bandiyappa
- Produced by: Narasimhulu
- Starring: Vybhav; Danny Sapani; Manvitha; Sadhu Kokila
- Cinematography: Kumar Gowda
- Edited by: K. M. Prakash
- Music by: Dharma Vish
- Production company: Om Balaji Enterprises
- Distributed by: R.S.Production
- Release date: 23 November 2018
- Running time: 138 minutes
- Country: India
- Language: Kannada

Tarakaasura (transl. Demon Protector) is a 2018 Indian Kannada-language action thriller film written and directed by Chandrashekar Bandiyappa and produced by Narasimhulu. It stars Vybhav and Manvitha. The film also marked Kannada debut of Danny Sapani who plays the lead villain. The film got a huge response for its making and story based on a tribe called "Budbudke", also known as Halakki Vokkaliga which is on the verge of extinction.

The film was shot in Mysuru, Mandya, Chamarajanagara in Karnataka.

== Cast ==
- Vybhav as Carbon
- Danny Sapani as Kalinga
- Manvitha as Muttamma
- Sadhu Kokila
- Mata Koppala

== Soundtrack ==
No.	Title	Singer(s)	Length
1.	"Kannada Kaliyo"	Shiva Rajkumar
2.	"Chanda Mama Kalide Kathe"	Sadhu Kokila, Naveen Sajju
3.	"Bhairagi Ninge Boomthai Hasge"	Sadhu Kokila
4.	Untitled	Kailash Kher, Malavalli Nagendra, Disha Ramesh
