= Brihaspathi (film) =

- Poster
- Directed by: Nanda Kishore
- Written by: Nanda Kishore
- Screenplay by: Nanda Kishore
- Story by: R. Velraj
- Based on: Velaiilla Pattadhari
- Produced by: Rockline Venkatesh
- Starring: Manoranjan Ravichandran; Mishti Chakraborthy; Saikumar Pudipeddi; Sithara
- Cinematography: Satya Hegde
- Edited by: K. M. Prakash
- Music by: V. Harikrishna
- Production company: Rockline Entertainments Pvt Ltd
- Release date: 5 January 2018
- Running time: 155 minutes
- Country: India
- Language: Kannada

Brihaspathi is a 2018 Indian Kannada-language comedy drama film directed by Nanda Kishore and produced by Rockline Venkatesh under his home banner. The film stars Manoranjan Ravichandran, Mishti Chakraborthy, while Saikumar, Kanika Mann, Sithara, Sadhu Kokila, Avinash and Tarak Ponannappa play supporting roles.

The film's album and score were composed by V. Harikrishna. The cinematography is by Satya Hegde and the editing by K. M. Prakash. The filming commenced in early 2017 and underwent the title change twice during the making. The previous titles were Vrutti Illada Padavidhara and Son of Ravichandran. The movie is a remake of the 2014 Tamil movie Velaiilla Pattadhari.

== Plot ==
Sudhir, a graduate who has been unemployed for several years, finally lands a job by overcoming various obstacles.

== Cast ==
- Manoranjan Ravichandran as Sudhir
- Mishti Chakraborthy as Shalini
- Saikumar as Sudhir's father
- Kanika Mann
- Sithara as Sudhir's mother
- G.Muni Prasanna as Government Officer
- Avinash
- Sadhu Kokila
- Tarak Ponnappa
- Prakash Belawadi

== Production ==
In April 2016, it was reported that after having watched the success of actor Dhanush's Tamil films Velaiilla Pattadhari and Visaranai, producer Rockline Venkatesh bought its remake rights in Kannada from Dhanush's Wunderbar Films and chose director Nanda Kishore to lead the former film. In August 2016, actor V. Ravichandran's son Manoranjan Ravichandran was selected to play the lead role even before his first film Saheba released. It was reported that actress Amala Paul would reprise her role Shalini in Kannada version as well. However, it was later reported that actress Rachita Ram was chosen for the same role. Finally, Bollywood actress Mishti was finalized for the role which apparently made her excited since she considered herself to be an ardent fan of actor Dhanush. After the first schedule in Bengaluru, the team headed to Mysore to film a montage song and few sequences.

== Soundtrack ==
Brihaspathi

Soundtrack album by V. Harikrishna
- Released: 2017
- Recorded: 2017
- Genre: Soundtrack
- Length: 22:33
- Label: Junglee Music
- Producer: V. Harikrishna

V. Harikrishna chronology
Bharjari (2017)	Brihaspathi (2017)	Life Jothe Ondh Selfie (2018)

V. Harikrishna has composed the soundtrack and background music for the film. The soundtrack album consists of six songs. Lyrics for the tracks were written by Yogaraj Bhat and Pradyumna Narahalli. The audio was released by the actor Jaggesh along with KFPA President Muniratna who is also the distributor of the film.

Track-List
No.	Title	Lyrics	Singer(s)	Length
1.	"Damaru Damaru Dam"	Yogaraj Bhat	Puneeth Rajkumar	3;50
2.	"Nodrappa Nammavanu"	Yogaraj Bhat	Tippu	2:33
3.	"Aagale Beku Naavu"	Yogaraj Bhat	Vijay Prakash	2:51
4.	"Amma Nann Amma"	Pradyumna Narahalli	Santhosh Venky, K. S. Chithra	4:56
5.	"Ontharadalli Ella Haayagide"	Yogaraj Bhat	Karthik	4:13
6.	"Dandam Dashagunam"	Pradyumna Narahalli	Ranjith	4:10
Total length:				22:33

== Release ==
The film released on 5 January 2018 making it the first Kannada film released in the year 2018.

=== Reception ===
The Times of India" rated the film 3/5 and noted "Bruhaspati might not be VIP but it has its own charm with references to Rajkumar and Sudhir and other local analogies. This is a decent effort and one can watch it if you like films that are masala but not really over the top." Shyam Prasad S of Bangalore Mirror scored the film at 3 out of 5 stars and says There is a marked improvement in Manoranjan, even if much is still expected regarding the clarity of words he delivers. He sounds much like an unrefined Ravichandran. Nanda brings out a clinical perfection in executing this film. From the supporting cast to the behind-the-scene work by composer Harikrishna and cinematographer Satya Hegde, everyone seems to have followed the template to perfection.
