= Sundaranga Jaana =

- Theatrical Release Poster
- Directed by: Ramesh Aravind
- Screenplay by: Ramesh Aravind
- Story by: Maruthi
- Based on: Bhale Bhale Magadivoy by Maruthi
- Produced by: Rockline Venkatesh; Allu Aravind
- Dialogues by: Guruprasad
- Starring: Ganesh; Shanvi Srivastava; Rangayana Raghu; Devaraj
- Cinematography: Manohar Joshi
- Edited by: Jo. Ni. Harsha
- Music by: B. Ajaneesh Loknath
- Production companies: Rockline Entertainments Pvt Ltd; GA2 Pictures
- Release date: 23 December 2016
- Running time: 135 Minutes
- Country: India
- Language: Kannada

Sundaranga Jaana is a 2016 Indian Kannada-language romantic comedy film directed by Ramesh Aravind and produced by Rockline Venkatesh and Allu Aravind under the banner Rockline Entertainments Pvt. Ltd and GA2 Pictures. A remake of the 2015 Telugu film Bhale Bhale Magadivoy, the film stars Ganesh and Shanvi Srivastava in the lead roles, with Devaraj, Rangayana Raghu, Ravishankar Gowda and Vasishta N. Simha featuring in supporting roles. The title of the film was taken from a track of the same title from the 1970 Kannada film Samshaya Phala.

The film was earlier titled as Gandu Endare Gandu and later rechristened to Sundaranga Jaana. Filming began on 25 February 2016.

== Plot ==
Lakshman Prasad alias Lucky is an absent-minded junior botanist, who gets easily distracted by everything. Lucky's father Anjaneya Prasad arranges his marriage with the daughter of Panduranga Rao, who runs a security company. Rao soon breaks the alliance after learning about Lucky's mental condition and warns him not to show up again. On his way to donate blood to his boss, Lucky gets diverted after seeing and falling in love with Nandana, a kuchipudi dance teacher, and also creates a positive impression by unknowingly donating blood to one of her students.

In their frequent meetings, Lucky keeps forgetting things, but manages to hide this shortcoming from Nandana by claiming he is a philanthropist. Lucky is unaware of the fact that Nandana is Rao's daughter, whom he was supposed to marry before. Rao's friend "Wrong Talk" Ramanujam's son Ajay, a police inspector, also falls in love with Nandana, while she is waiting for Lucky's proposal. While trying to propose on her birthday, Lucky ends up taking Nandana's pregnant sister-in-law, who is experiencing labour pains, to a nearby hospital. After the delivery, Nandana proposes to Lucky, and they decide to get married. Nandana informs Lucky that her father has accepted their proposal and wants to meet him.

Lucky and Rao meet as strangers when Rao insults Lucky after an incident with a little girl, who was about to fall into a pond. Lucky later realises that Nandana is Rao's daughter and flees. Lucky makes his friend Ali pose as Nandana's lover to Rao, while he joins Rao as an apprentice. When Nandana's relatives attend the naming ceremony of the newborn child, Rao's nephew assumes Ali is her potential lover, and all the others assume Lucky is Nandana's suitor. Rao's nephew becomes further confused when Lucky visits a sick Nandana to spend some quality time with her.

A few days later, Rao wants Lucky to escort Nandana and her relatives to Srisailam. While driving, Lucky misses a turn and reaches the outskirts of Bangalore, but takes them to a nearby temple and explains that it is a very historically significant temple. Ajay, who is confused about the identity of Nandana's lover (as Lucky and his friend keep changing places depending on who is around at the moment) manages to learn Lucky's identity. When they all arrive back home in the morning, Ajay reveals Lucky's mental condition to Nandana and they break up. On the day of Nandana's engagement with Ajay, Rao, who has become aware of the sincerity of Lucky's love, advises her to choose Lucky over Ajay.

When Ajay protests over this, Ramanujam advises Ajay against making any stupid attempts to marry Nandana by force and tells him to choose someone else. Rao meets Lucky's parents and reveals that he has been aware of his love for Nandana, and says he is willing to get Nandana and Lucky married to each other. Lucky, by now, decides to settle in Canada. Rao and Lucky's parents head to the airport, but the Canada flight takes off. When they get disappointed, Rao and Lucky's parents notice that Lucky is still sitting in the passenger lounge. When they enquire, Lucky tells them that his forgetfulness had made him take his passbook instead of his passport. Nandana comes to the airport and meets Lucky. Lucky and Nandana marry and they live happily in their fantasy world.

== Cast ==
- Ganesh as Lucky alias Lakshman Prasad.
- Shanvi Srivastava as Nandana alias Nandu, Panduranga Rao's daughter
- Devaraj as Panduranga Rao, Nandana's father
- Ravishankar Gowda as Ali, Lucky's friend
- Rangayana Raghu as Anjaneya Prasad, Lucky's father
- Sadhu Kokila as Hanumantha Rao, Nandana's uncle
- Sihi Kahi Chandru as "Wrong Talk" Ramanujam, Panduranga Rao's friend and Ajay's father
- Vasishta N. Simha as Inspector Ajay
- Pradyumna Narahalli as Gungru, Lucky's friend
- Veena Sundar as Lucky's mother
- Jyothi Rai as Nandana's sister-in-law
- Ramesh Aravind as himself in a guest appearance

== Soundtrack ==
Sundaranga Jaana

Soundtrack album by B. Ajaneesh Loknath
- Released: 2016
- Genre: Feature film soundtrack
- Length: 13:57
- Label: Lahari Music

B. Ajaneesh Loknath chronology
Sipaayi (2016)	Sundaranga Jaana (2016)	Srikanta (2017)

B. Ajaneesh Loknath composed the film's songs. Lyrics were penned by Jayant Kaikini and two debutant lyricists Pradyumna Narahalli and Balu. The soundtrack album consists of four tracks.

No.	Title	Lyrics	Artist(s)	Length
1.	"Kalkond Bitte"	Pradyumna Narahalli	Haricharan	3:47
2.	"Ee Santhelu Siguva"	Jayant Kaikini	Shreya Ghoshal, Santhosh Venky	3:29
3.	"Fly Fly... Fly Fly"	Pradyumna Narahalli	Lavanya, Shashank Sheshagiri	3:24
4.	"Nandana"	Balu	Vijay Prakash, Indu Nagaraj	3:17

== Reception ==
S. Shyam Prasad of Bangalore Mirror gave 3 out of 5 stars and verdicted "Overall, Ramesh Aravind has created a perfect holiday film for the family." Sunayana Suresh from The Times of India gave 3.5 out of 5 stars and wrote "This film is especially for people who love their quintessential filmi tales, replete with a good dose of romance, comedy and masala." S. M. Shashiprasad from Deccan Chronicle wrote "With the right proportion of comedy, romance and a pinch of emotion Sundaranga Jaana is perfect mix for an hilarious journey." A. Sharadhaa from The New Indian Express wrote "The excellent production qualities are evident right from the beginning and the laudable performances by Ganesh and Shanvi just add to the joy of watching the film. Watch Sundaraanga Jaana for a balanced dose of wit with twists."
