= Chowkidar (2026 film) =

2026 Indian film by Chandrashekar Bandiyappa

- Theatrical release poster
- Directed by: Chandrashekar Bandiyappa
- Written by: Chandrashekar Bandiyappa
- Produced by: Kallahalli Chandrashekhara
- Starring: Pruthvi Ambaar; P. Sai Kumar; Dhanya Ramkumar
- Cinematography: Siddu Kanchanahalli
- Edited by: Jnaanesh B Matad
- Music by: Sachin Basrur
- Production company: V S Entertainments
- Release date: 30 January 2026
- Country: India
- Language: Kannada

Chowkidar is a 2026 Indian Kannada-language action drama film written and directed by Chandrashekar Bandiyappa. The film stars Pruthvi Ambaar, P. Sai Kumar and Dhanya Ramkumar.

The film was released on 30 January 2026.

== Cast ==
- Pruthvi Ambaar as Siddharth "Siddhu"
- P. Sai Kumar as Prakash Gowda
- Dhanya Ramkumar as Chaitra
- Swetha as Sudha
- Sudha Rani as Umashankar
- Dharma
- Muniraju as Shankarappa
- Arjun Kautilya
- Benjimin Sandeep
- Prashant Gouli
- Gilli Nata

== Music ==
The background score and songs were composed by Sachin Basrur.

| No. | Title | Lyrics | Singer(s) | Length |
|---|---|---|---|---|
| 1. | "Geleya" | Santhosh Naik | Jaskaran Singh, Sangeetha Ravindranath | 4:08 |
| 2. | "Ishta Aade" | Pramod Maravante | Sachin Basrur, Prithwi Bhat | 3:49 |
| 3. | "Oh My Bro" | V. Nagendra Prasad | Kailash Kher | 4:04 |
| 4. | "Appa Anthem" | V Nagendra Prasad | Vijay Prakash | 4:50 |

== Release and reception ==
Chowkidar was released on 30 January 2026.

Y. Maheshwara Reddy of Bangalore Mirror rated it 3 out of 5 and noted the performances of Pruthvi Ambaar and Sai Kumar. A Sharadhaa rated it if 2.5/5 and wrote in her review to The New Indian Express that the film is "at its strongest when it confronts the uncomfortable truth that unchecked love can mirror neglect". A. Sharadhaa of The New Indian Express rated the film 2.5 out of 5 and wrote that it is "at its strongest when it confronts the uncomfortable truth that unchecked love can mirror neglect". The Times of India's Susmita Sameera gave a rating of 2 out of 5 and opined that "with tighter writing and more balanced character development, the emotional connection could have been far stronger".
