= Mix-minus =

Audio mixing setup used in broadcast and sound reinforcement

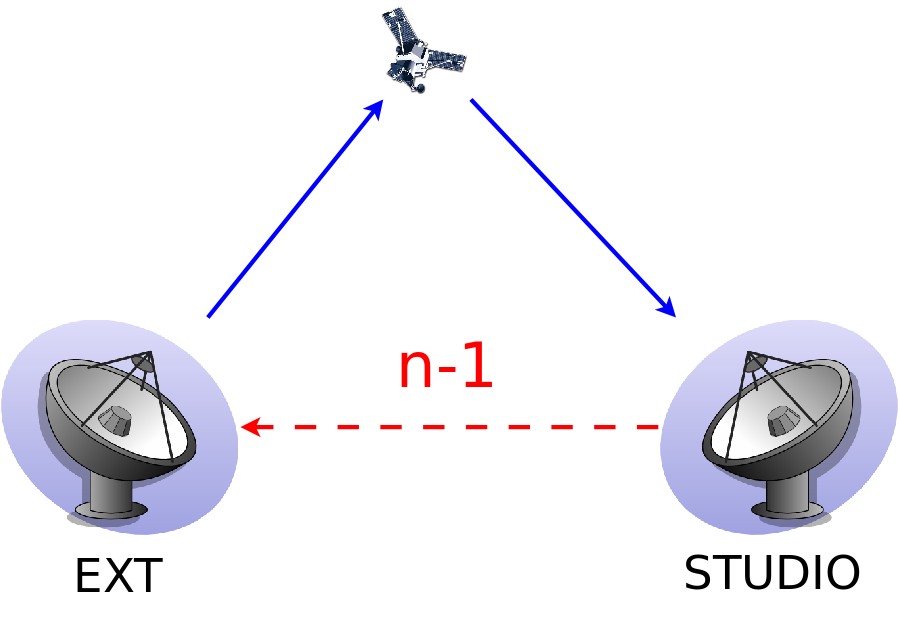
Example of a mix-minus (notated as n-1) from a studio to a satellite linked remote unit.

In audio engineering, a mix-minus or clean feed is a particular setup of a mixing console or matrix mixer, such that an output of the mixer contains everything except a designated input. Mix-minus is often used to prevent echoes or feedback in broadcast or sound reinforcement systems.

== Examples ==
A common situation in which a mix-minus is used is when a telephone hybrid is connected to a console, usually at a radio station. The person on the telephone hears all relevant feeds, usually an identical mix to that of the master bus, including the DJ's mic feed, except that the caller does not hear their own voice.

Mix-minus is also often used together with IFB systems in electronic news gathering (ENG) for television news reporters and interview subjects speaking to a host from a remote outside broadcast (OB) location. Because of the delay that is introduced in most means of transmission (including satellite feeds and audio over IP connections), the remote subject's voice has to be removed from their earpiece. Otherwise, the subject would hear themselves with a slight (but very distracting) delay.

Another common example is in the field of sound reinforcement, when people need to hear a full mix except their own microphone. Legislative bodies of government may use a large mix-minus system, for instance houses of parliament or congressional groups that have a small loudspeaker and a microphone at each seat. From the desktop loudspeaker, each person hears every microphone except their own. This enables all participants to hear each other clearly but minimizes problems with acoustic feedback. In 1994, the first digital audio implementation of such a system was installed at the United States Senate building, with more than 100 mix-minus outputs, one for each senator and also guest seats.

Mix-minus is also used with VoIP communication when recording for podcasts: mix-minus removes the caller's voice from the VoIP call, but allows them to hear all other channels available at the mixing console (mixer).

Some broadcast mixing desks, notably those designed in house by the BBC, maintain a separate mix bus for clean feeds.
