= Saheba (film) =

2017 film written and directed by Bharath

- Directed by: Bharath
- Written by: Bharath
- Produced by: Jayanna; Bhogendra
- Starring: Manoranjan Ravichandran; Shanvi Srivastava
- Cinematography: G. S. V. Seetharam
- Edited by: Deepu S. Kumar
- Music by: V. Harikrishna
- Production company: Jayanna Combines
- Release date: 25 August 2017
- Country: India
- Language: Kannada
- Budget: 25 million.-->
- Box office: est.₹90 million

Saheba is a 2017 Indian Kannada-language romantic action film written and directed by Bharath. It features Manoranjan Ravichandran, son of actor-director V. Ravichandran, making his debut, along with Shanvi Srivastava. Bullet Prakash, Kuri Prathap and Lakshmi play the supporting roles. The score and soundtrack for the film is by V. Harikrishna and the cinematography is by G. S. V. Seetharam.

The film was officially launched on 14 January 2016, coinciding the Sankranthi festival. The principal photography started on 18 January 2016 in Bangalore. The filming is also held at Venice, Italy. The film was released on 25 August 2017. The core plot of the movie was reported to have been inspired by the play Pygmalion and its movie version My Fair Lady.

== Cast ==
- Manoranjan Ravichandran as Manu
- Shanvi Srivastava as Nandini
- Lakshmi
- Nabha Natesh in a special appearance in song "Yaare Ninu Roza Huve"
- Pramila Joshai
- Sanika
- Chidanand
- Dayanand Sharma
- Bullet Prakash
- Kuri Prathap
- Gopalkrishna Deshpande

== Soundtrack ==
Saheba

Soundtrack album by V. Harikrishna
- Released: 10 April 2017
- Genre: Feature film soundtrack
- Language: Kannada
- Label: Lahari Music
- Producer: V. Harikrishna

The film's score and soundtrack was composed by V. Harikrishna. The audio was released online on 9 April 2017 and the music rights were acquired by Lahari Music. The song "Yaare Neenu Roja Hoove" from the V. Ravichandran starrer Naanu Nanna Hendthi (1985) which was sung by S. P. Balasubrahmanyam was reused in the film.

Tracklist
No.	Title	Lyrics	Singer(s)	Length
1.	"Heegethake"	Jayanth Kaikini	Armaan Malik	3:51
2.	"Kolige Ranga"	V. Nagendra Prasad	Tippu	3:45
3.	"Saheba"	Kaviraj	Karthik, Shweta Mohan	3:30
4.	"Thera Haadu"	Dr. H.S. Venkateshamurthy	Karthik	2:22
5.	"Yaare Neenu"	Hamsalekha	S. P. Balasubrahmanyam, Ranjith	3:47
