= Dhanya Ramkumar =

Indian actress and model

- Born: 23 December 1995 (age 30)
- Occupations: Actress; model
- Years active: 2021–present
- Father: Ramkumar
- Family: Rajkumar family
- Awards: Filmfare Award for Best Female Debut – Kannada (2022)

Dhanya Ramkumar is an Indian actress and model who works in Kannada films. She started her career as an employee at PR firm in Bangalore and as a fashion model. She won the Filmfare Award for Best Female Debut – South for her role in Ninna Sanihake. After the success in her debut movie, she got the role in Kannada movies Hide and Seek, The Judgement -- See You in Court, and Ella Ninagagi.

== Early life ==
Dhanya is the grand daughter of veteran actor and one of the biggest icon of Indian cinema, Dr. Rajkumar and daughter of actor Ramkumar and Poornima. She grew up in Bangalore, Karnataka. After completing her schooling pursued a B.A. degree in Mass Communication Studies from Jain University.

== Filmography ==
=== Films ===
Year	Title	Role	Notes	Ref.
2021	Ninna Sanihake	Amrutha		
2024	Hide and Seek	Hasini		
2024	The Judgement			
2024	Powder	Nithya		
2024	Kaalapatthar	Ganga		
2026	Chowkidar	Chaitra		
2026	Yella Ninagagi	TBA		

== Awards and nominations ==
Year	Award	Category	Work	Result	Ref.
2022	67th Filmfare Awards South	Filmfare Award for Best Female Debut – Kannada	Ninna Sanihake	Won	
