= Aane Pataaki =

- Directed by: Chandrashekhar Bandiyappa
- Written by: Chandrashekar Bandiyappa
- Produced by: L. P. Suresh Babu
- Starring: Srujan Lokesh; Parvati Nirban; Jai Jagadish; Vijayalakshmi Singh; Sadhu Kokila; Rangayana Raghu
- Cinematography: J. S. Wali
- Edited by: Lingaraju
- Music by: Dharma Vish
- Production companies: Ananya & Aishwarya Creations
- Release date: 17 May 2013
- Running time: 130 minutes
- Country: India
- Language: Kannada

Aane Pataki is a 2013 Indian Kannada comedy film written and directed by debutant Chandrashekar Bandiyappa. The film stars Srujan Lokesh in the lead.

== Plot ==
The movie is about a wannabe actor who comes to the city aspiring to become a hero. However, because of his innocence and naivety he is often teased and made fun. He is invited to a party at the house of a movie producer because of an error made by the producers secretary. There he falls in love with a "Star Guest".

== Cast ==
- Srujan Lokesh as Besagarahalli Bhyregowda
- Parvathi Nirban as Rakshitha
- Bhasker as Adi
- Rangayana Raghu as Govindanna
- Sadhu Kokila as Chinnadappa
- Jai Jagadish as Jagadish
- Vijayalakshmi Singh as Vijayalakshmi
- Rockline Sudhakar
- Somanna Jadar
- Cable Anand
- Akul

== Soundtrack ==
Aane Pataaki

Soundtrack album by Dharma Vish
- Released: 2013
- Recorded: 2013
- Genre: Feature film soundtrack
- Length: 16:07
- Language: Kannada

Official audio
- Aane Pataaki - Full Album on YouTube

The soundtrack of the album was released on 7 May 2013.

Track listing
No.	Title	Singer(s)	Length
1.	"Aane Pataaki"	Dharma Vish	3:22
2.	"Itta Itta Baa"	Vijay Prakash, Sunitha	4:08
3.	"8ne Taragathi"	Sangeetha Rajeev	4:08
4.	"One One Za"	Queeny Fernandez	4:19
Total length:			16:07

== Reception ==
=== Critical response ===
A critic from The Times of India scored the film at 3 out of 5 stars and says "Srujan Lokesh has tried his best, but could have done better. Parvathi Nirbhang hardly has anything to do. However, you can look forward to some catchy tunes by Dharma Vish. Sangeetha Rajeev makes a commendable debut as a singer by rendering the pleasant number ‘Entane Tharagathi...’ Wali's camera work is average". B S Srivani from Deccan Herald wrote "Towards the end, it is soapy mayhem with romance taking a backseat. “Aane Pataaki” had so much to offer but disappoints like the firecracker after which it is named, not going out with a bang but a whimper". A Sharadhaa from The New Indian Express wrote "The only attraction in the songs are some foreign dancers sizzling in shorts. The editing table has done an amateurish job. The Verdict: Filled with old jokes, this is a film people can definitely avoid". A critic from Bangalore Mirror wrote "He puts in the effort, but it is a wrong project really. Parvati Nirban’s only expression in the film is a smile and using her photograph instead would have been a cost-saving decision. The director has a long way to go before he understands how and why films should be made".
