= Dharma Vish =

Background information
- Born: Bangalore, Karnataka, India
- Genres: Film score, Soundtrack, World music
- Occupations: Film composer, instrumentalist, music producer
- Instruments: Violin, Harmonium, Keyboard
- Years active: 1998 –present
- Label: SounDesigns
- Website: www.dharmavish.com

Dharma Vish (born Dharmendra Vishakantaiah), is an Indian music composer, music producer, and songwriter, who works primarily in Hindi and Kannada cinema. Beginning his career as a music programmer in the late 1990s, he worked as a score programmer for Bollywood films such as M.S. Dhoni: The Untold Story (2016) and Toilet: Ek Prem Katha (2017). As a solo composer, he is known for his work on films like Raagdesh (2017), Sinnga (2019), and Yala Kunni (2024).

== Career ==
Dharma Vish began his musical career working as a music programmer and arranger in the South Indian and Bollywood film industries. In the late 1990s, he worked on the programming teams for films such as Upendra (1999) and Okkadu (2003).

He later transitioned into music production, specializing in background scores. Between 2012 and 2018, he served as the Music Producer for the background scores of several commercially successful Bollywood films, largely in collaboration with composers and directors like Neeraj Pandey and Tigmanshu Dhulia. His credits during this period include M.S. Dhoni: The Untold Story, Drishyam, Toilet: Ek Prem Katha, and Rustom.

In addition to background scores, Dharma Vish has composed songs and original scores for Kannada and Hindi films. He composed the score for the critically acclaimed film Raagdesh (2017) and the ZEE5 release Yaara (2020). In the Kannada industry, he composed the music for films such as Sinnga, for which he received a Radio Mirchi Music Award nomination, and Rathavara.

His recent projects include the musical composition for Yala Kunni (2024) and Forest (2025).

== Philanthropy ==
Beyond his musical career, Dharma Vish is actively involved in community welfare initiatives for the entertainment industry. He serves as the General Secretary of the Karnataka Film Musicians' Association (KFMA).

During the COVID-19 pandemic in India, he led relief measures to support artists whose livelihoods were affected by the lockdown. Leading a volunteer group within the association, he facilitated the distribution of food and health kits to musicians and coordinated with the Government of Karnataka to ensure members received financial aid through the Seva Sindhu portal. He also mobilized funds through collaborations with audio labels and industry leaders to provide direct monetary support to distressed artists.

== Filmography ==
=== As composer ===
Year	Film	Score	Songs	Language	Notes
2013	Aane Pataaki	Yes	Yes	Kannada	
2015	Rathaavara	Yes	Yes	Kannada	
2015	Sapnon Ki Rani	Yes	Yes	Hindi	
2016	Just Aakasmika	Yes	No	Kannada	
2016	Luv U Alia	Yes	No	Kannada	
2017	Raagdesh	Yes	No	Hindi	
2018	Saheb, Biwi Aur Gangster 3	Yes	No	Hindi	
2018	Aapla Manus	Yes	No	Hindi	
2018	Aiyaary	Yes	No	Hindi	
2018	Tharakaasura	Yes	Yes	Hindi	
2018	22 Yards	Yes	No	Hindi	Premiered at the San Francisco Film Festival
2018	Midnight Delhi	Yes	No	Hindi	Premiered at the Singapore Film Festival
2018	Looty	Yes	Yes	Hindi	
2019	Brahmachari	Yes	Yes	Kannada	
2019	Sinnga	Yes	Yes	Kannada	Nominated for Music Composer of the year - Radio Mirchi
2019	Milan Talkies	Yes	No	Hindi	
2019	Jhoota Kahin Ka	Yes	No	Hindi	
2020	Kya Masti Kya Dhoom	Yes	No	Hindi	
2020	Yaara	Yes	No	Hindi	Released on ZEE5
2020	Paika Bidroha	Yes	No	Hindi	
2020	P Se Pyaar F Se Faraar	Yes	No	Hindi	
2021	Arjun Gowda	Yes	Yes	Kannada	
2022	Shambho Shiva Shankara	Yes	No	Kannada	
2022	Red Collar	Yes	Yes	Hindi	Unreleased film
2023	Bengaluru Boys	Yes	Yes	Kannada	
2023	Raja Marthanda	Yes	Yes	Kannada	
2024	5D	Yes	No	Kannada	
2024	Yala Kunni	Yes	Yes	Kannada	
2024	Mr. Natwarlal	Yes	Yes	Kannada	
2025	Forest	Yes	Yes	Kannada	

=== As music producer/programmer ===
Year	Film	Language
1998	A	Kannada
1998	Mangalyam Tantunanena	Kannada
1999	Upendra	Kannada
1999	Idu Entha Premavayya	Kannada
2000	Indradhanush	Kannada
2002	Thuntata	Kannada
2003	Okkadu	Telugu
2003	Neetho Vastha	Telugu
2004	Monalisa	Kannada
2004	Rain Rain Come Again	Malayalam
2005	Finger Print	Malayalam
2005	Ramji Londonwaley	Hindi
2005	Ghajini	Tamil
2005	Thotti Jaya	Tamil
2005	Private Moments	English
2006	Balram vs. Tharadas	Malayalam
2006	Vettaiyaadu Vilaiyaadu	Tamil
2006	Perarasu	Tamil
2006	Tata Birla Madhyalo Laila	Telugu
2006	Backwaters	English
2006	Sainikudu	Telugu
2007	Pachaikili Muthucharam	Tamil
2007	Munna	Telugu
2007	Manhattan Biryani	English
2007	Natasha	English
2007	Ram Gopal Varma Ki Aag	Hindi
2007	Don	Telugu
2007	Unnale Unnale	Tamil
2008	Bheemaa	Tamil
2008	Dhaam Dhoom	Tamil
2008	Abhiyum Naanum	Tamil
2008	Alibhabha	Tamil
2009	Ayan	Tamil
2009	Peraanmai	Tamil
2009	Aadhavan	Tamil
2010	Paappi Appachaa	Malayalam
2010	Chikku Bukku	Tamil
2011	Ilaignan	Tamil
2011	Kaavalan	Tamil
2011	Payanam	Tamil, Telugu
2011	Engeyum Kadhal	Tamil
2011	7 Aum Arivu	Tamil
2012	Maattrraan	Tamil
2012	Sidlingu	Kannada
2012	Thuppakki	Tamil
2013	Googly	Kannada
2014	Goli Soda	Tamil
2014	Holiday: A Soldier Is Never Off Duty	Hindi
2014	Humshakals	Hindi
2014	Love in Mandya	Kannada
2015	Prem Ratan Dhan Payo	Hindi
2015	Bhaag Johnny	Hindi
2015	Drishyam	Hindi
2015	All Is Well	Hindi
2015	Roy	Hindi
2015	Baby	Hindi
2015	Dolly Ki Doli	Hindi
2015	Promise Dad	English
2016	M.S. Dhoni: The Untold Story	Hindi
2016	Madaari	Hindi
2016	Ambarsariya	Punjabi
2016	Neer Dose	Kannada
2016	Kaptaan	Punjabi
2017	Commando 2	Hindi
2017	Naam Shabana	Hindi
2017	Toilet: Ek Prem Katha	Hindi
2017	Force 2	Hindi
2021	Sandeep Aur Pinky Faraar	Hindi
2022	Janhit Mein Jaari	Hindi
