= Talkback (television production) =

Device

Talkback, or in-ear talkback, is a device used by directors and producers to talk directly to the anchor or the host of the show. This device enables the show directors to send out commands, instructions, content information and even the complete script to the anchors or hosts of the show. Talkback consists of an earpiece made of silicon or foam bud that sits just inside the left or right ear, attached to a curly or straight acoustic tube that goes around and behind the ear, then down the back of the neck to a wireless receiver. There is an optional collar clip to hold the cable in place, and hair/clothing can be used to hide the kit as much as possible. The volume of the speech coming through the earpiece can be adjusted. The wireless receiver gets signals from a transmitter. An audio mixer placed in production control rooms (PCR) would be wired to the transmitter. The input for the audio mixer would come from a microphone in which the director speaks and sends out information. This information is carried to the talkback and the host follows the instruction.

== See also ==
- Interruptible foldback
- Talkback (recording)
