= Carmel School, Mangaluru =

Carmel School

Location
- Mangaluru, Karnataka; India
- Coordinates: 12.856715°N 74.836419°E

Information
- Type: CBSE
- Established: 1951
- Website: https://carmelschoolmangalore.com

Carmel School is a CBSE school at Pandeshwar in Mangaluru city of Karnataka state in India. It was established as an English Medium school in 1951. In 2014, it was affiliated to CBSE. Co-curricular activities such as Karate, Music classes, Dance classes and Zumba classes are offered to the students by this school.

== Education Labs ==
The school contains the following labs

- Bio-Tech Lab
- Physics Lab
- Chemistry Lab
- Biology Lab
- Computer Science Lab
- Home Science Lab
