= Hiremagaluru Kannan =

Indian TV and radio personality

- Born: Tamil Nadu, India
- Occupations: Litterateur; priest; writer; television personality; radio jockey
- Parent(s): Savyasachi Venkatachar (Father); Shakunthala Parthasarathy K.V (Mother)
- Relatives: Chakravarti Tirumagan Mohan bargavan vijayragavan Tulasi ram badrinath (Brother)

Hiremagaluru Kannan is an Indian litterateur, priest, writer, television personality and radio jockey.

He is associated with program ′Coffee with Kannan′, in FM radio station Namm Radio, having 400,000 listeners worldwide.

== Bibliography ==
- Nudi Pooje
- Kannan Nota

== See also ==
- Hiremagaluru, a locality in Chikkamagaluru, Karnataka, India
