= Yala Kunni =

2024 Kannada-language film

- Theatrical release poster
- Directed by: N. R. Pradeep Kumar
- Written by: N. R. Pradeep Kumar
- Starring: Komal Kumar; Nisarga Appanna; Mayur Patel; Yathiraj; Akarsh Vajramuni
- Cinematography: Halesh S.
- Edited by: Deepu S. Kumar
- Music by: Dharma Vish
- Production companies: Narasimha Cinemas; Soundarya Lahari Combines
- Release date: 25 October 2024
- Country: India
- Language: Kannada

Yala Kunni is a 2024 Kannada-language action comedy film directed by N. R. Pradeep Kumar and produced by Anusuya Komal Kumar and Sahana Murthy under Soundarya Lahari Combines and Narasimha Cinemas. It stars Komal Kumar and Nisarga Appanna in lead roles and Mayur Patel, Yathiraj, Akarsh Vajramuni, H. G. Dattatreya, Sadhu Kokila, Mithra and Suchendra Prasad in supporting roles.

The film was released on 25 October 2024.

== Plot ==
In a village, cruel rich man Nagappa oppresses locals who unite and kill him. His orphaned son lives among them, seeking revenge but eventually sacrificing himself for their sake.

== Cast ==
- Komal Kumar in a dual role as
  - Sathya Harishchandra/Punyakoti
  - KD Nagappa, Sathya's father
- Nisarga Appanna as Akshara
- Mayur Patel as Maraka
- Yathiraj as Gadava, Sathya's friend
- Akarsh Vajramuni
- H. G. Dattatreya as Banana Jayaram, MLA
- Sadhu Kokila
- Mithra as Sugandha Raja
- Suchendra Prasad
- Shivaraj KR Pete
- Suman Nagarkar as Matangi
- Manasi Sudhir as Sannaki
- Raghu Ramanakoppa
- Tabla Nani
- Mahantesh Hiremath as Mudde, Sathya's friend
- Raju Talikote as Godman

== Release ==
The film was released on 25 October 2024.

== Reception ==
A Sharadhaa of The New Indian Express rated the film three out of five stars and wrote that "Yalakunni manages to deliver laughter and reflection in equal measure, making it an entertainer that might even make one curious enough to learn more about who Vajramuni, the yesteryear villain, truly was." Vinay Lokesh of The Times of India gave it two-and-a-half out of five stars praised the performance of Komal but criticized the film stating, "Newbie Pradeep presents a lackluster subject that lacks focus and revolves around village issues. The writing is weak, and the scenes lack continuity, making it difficult to stay engaged. The story itself seems outdated and conventional."

Suhasini Srihari of Deccan Herald gave it two-and-a-half out of five stars and noted that "The story takes on multiple themes such as class, caste, and religion; but none of them are fully explored. Set in the fictional village of Dharanimandala, the movie plays on the much-celebrated folk song, ‘Punyakoti’." Shashiprasad SM of Times Now also gave it two-and-a-half out of five stars and wrote, "If one is looking for a quality time filled with laughter and fun, Yalakunni may not meet those expectations. However, there is a character that evokes memories of the legendary Kannada actor, Vajramuni, which might catch your attention. Beyond that, the rest of the film is fairly unremarkable."
