= Kumaraswamy Layout =

- neighbourhood
- Location within Bengaluru
- Coordinates: 12.9041°N 77.5616°E
- Country: India
- State: Karnataka
- District: Bangalore Urban
- Metro: Bengaluru
- Zone: Bangalore South
- Ward: 181,197

Population
  - Total: 35,384

Languages
  - Official: Kannada
- Time zone: UTC+5:30 (IST)
- PIN: 560078
- Telephone code: 91-80
- Vehicle registration: KA 05
- Lok Sabha constituency: Bangalore South
- Vidhan Sabha constituency: Padmanabhanagar, Bangalore South

Kumaraswamy Layout is a sub locality in Banashankari, South Bengaluru, Karnataka, India. It is a relatively laidback area where one can find plenty of residences, educational institutions, government offices and commercial establishments.

== History ==
Kumaraswamy Layout was formed in the late 1970s by the BDA. In recent years, it has been seeing development under the BBMP. Many residential infrastructure projects have been carried out in the locality, with many still in progress. Despite good progress in infrastructure, economy and population growth, there have been issues pertaining to garbage collection, cleanliness, public safety and water-logging.

== General Information ==
- Kumaraswamy Layout is divided into 2 stages, with the 1st stage being the largest.
- An office of the Geological Survey of India (GSI) is located in this area. A celebratory marathon in honor of GSI's 175th anniversary started from its office in Kumaraswamy Layout.
- Kumaraswamy layout is also an educational hub surrounded by many colleges and institutions. The prominent ones being the Dayananda Sagar Institutions, Delhi Public school South and Alpine School.
- The area has many parks. All are maintained by the BDA. However, until recently the parks were not as well developed as other parks in the city. The park near 15E bus stand, called the Shri Atal Bihari Vajpayee Park, is well known for its size and extensive tree cover.
- Atma Darshan Yogashram, the southern branch of the Bihar School of Yoga is located in Kumaraswamy Layout (opposite to Dayananda Sagar University).
- Dayananda Sagar College of Engineering which was established in 1979 is located in Kumaraswamy Layout.
- The area is home to eminent Kannada writers like Jayanth Kaikini, A.N.Prahlada Rao and B.S.Keshava Rao. The late Vyasaraya Ballal, another famous Kannada writer, also lived here.
- There are quite a few shopping complexes in the proximity of Kumaraswamy Layout.
- There are many Hindu temples nearby, with most of them being dedicated to Ganesha, Venkateswara, Ayyappan and Lakshmi.
- SAGAR Hospital and Vasavi Hospital are two major healthcare centers in the area.

== Areas under Kumaraswamy layout ==
- ISRO Layout aka Vikram Sarabhai Layout- It is an 83-acre (340,000 m^{2}) planned residential area formed by BDA in the mid-1980s for ISRO employees. The area is now managed by the Space Employees Cooperative Housing Society. This area is also known as Vikram Sarabhai Layout (ವಿಕ್ರಮ ನಗರ), after the Indian space scientist, Vikram Sarabhai. The BDA's development of ISRO layout acted as a catalyst for further infrastructural developments in surrounding areas.
- Vasanthapura- It is a mythologically important village, just 12 km away from the City. The village is located on a small hillock with an ancient, quaint temple dedicated to Vasantha Vallabharayaswamy. It is over 600 years old. An idol of goddess Vasanthanayaki, the consort of Vallabharaya swami, can also be found here. Legend has it that sage Mandavya once disappeared from his ashram situated on the banks of the Ganges. His disciples were highly perturbed at the absence of their guru. They made a frantic search over the dales and hills. Finally, they located the rishi meditating in a cave in Vasanthapura. Another temple, situated by the side of Vallabharaya swami temple, is dedicated to Lord Bhavanishankara. This temple was constructed over 400 years ago by Samarth Ramadas, the guru of the well known Maratha ruler, Shivaji.
- Subramanyapura- It is a popular suburb near Kumaraswamy Layout which is adjacent to Vasanthapura. This area is famous for a freshwater lake called 'Dore kere' which is a popular destination for joggers in mornings and evenings.
- Vitthal Nagara- A newly formed residential area towards the west of ISRO Layout.
- Ilyas Nagar- A Muslim majority area which houses the famous Jamia Masjid and the Army Salvation Church.
- Yelachenahalli- A rapidly developing part of the city with a Namma Metro station and several commercial establishments.
- Bikasipura- It housed several industries and commercial establishments that serve consumers, such as Khoday's Breweries and Metro.
- Vasantha Vallabha Nagar- A developing part of the area. City Engineering College, Shri Shreedhara Swamy Ashram, ISKCON Krishna Leela Theme Park, and Mantri Arena Mall are located here.
- Kanaka Nagar
- Minhaj Nagar
- JHBCS (Jarganahalli Housing Board Cooperative Society) Layout (Kanaka Gruha)
- Teacher's Colony- An upper middle class sublocality. Divided into 2 stages, 1st stage is in Kumaraswamy Layout and 2nd stage is in Banashankari 2nd stage.
- Eshwara Nagar- One of ISRO's offices is located here.
- Bendre Nagar
- Gowdanapalya- Also, a very fast developing area in Bangalore.
- Naidu Layout
- Devarakere Extension- Part of ISRO Layout, located near Devarakere. Also known as Kalyani Nagar. Well known for the famous 'Kere Srinivasa' Temple. It also houses "Sri Krishna Bhavana", a popular restaurant.
- Kailash Nagar, Siddanna Layout, Prasanti Nagar, Chandra Nagar (ಚಂದ್ರ ನಗರ)- Known for the 'Om Shakthi Temple', Nanjappa Layout, Krishna Devaraya Nagar, Harsha Layout, Kashi Nagar, Nanjappa Layout, Sharada Nagar
- Vallabhai Layout
- Prathibha Industrial Estate
- Anuradha Industrial Estate
- Jayachamarajendra Industrial Estate
- Sri Maruthi Nagara
- Umarbagh Layout
- Rajyotsavanagar
- Lingegowda Colony
- Govinayakanahalli

== Transport ==
The area is easily accessible by Bengaluru Metropolitan Transport Corporation (BMTC) buses. Kumaraswamy Layout 2nd Stage is a sub Locality of Jayanagar Locality in Bangalore. Kumaraswamy Layout 2nd Stage is 8.46 km from Kempegowda Bus Station (Majestic Station).

- 15C (from 1st Stage via South end circle, RV Road), 15E (1st Stage), 15F (2nd Stage), 15G (2nd stage), 210A (ISRO Layout), 210AA (ISRO Layout), 210R (Vasanthapura), 210U (KS Layout West), 210UB (KS Layout West), 210X (Chandra Nagara) connects Kumaraswamy Layout to KR market and Kempegowda Bus Station/Majestic
- 13A, 13C, 210G, 210GA connects Kumaraswamy Layout to Banashankari, Jayanagar, Shanthinagar and Shivajinagar
- 412H (Hebbal via Inner Ring Road, Domlur, Hennur Cross), 500W (ITPL) connects Kumaraswamy Layout to Banashankari, Central Silk Board and beyond
- 411 connects Kumaraswamy Layout to Madiwala, Koramangala and Dommaluru
- 600G connects Kumaraswamy Layout to Central Silk Board, Jayadeva, Electronics City and Chandapura
- MBS-9 (210A-276) connects Kumaraswamy Layout to Malleshwaram, BEL Circle and Vidyaranyapura

Route numbers Chakra 3/3A (to Banashankari, RR Nagara), 402G (to Yelahanka Satellite Town 5th Phase), 202 (to Yeshwanthpura), 340C (to Parangipalya), 202E (to Mathikere), 374H (to Vijayanagara), 271M (to Jalahalli 7th camp) were discontinued due to poor response from the public.

All three metro stations on the Green Line (Namma Metro) (Silk Institute to Nagasandra) – Banashankari, Jayaprakash Nagara and Yelachenahalli are very close to the area.
