= Amruthavarshini =

Amruthavarshini (Kannada: ಅಮೃತ ವರ್ಷಿಣಿ, Hindi: अमृत वर्षिणी ) 100.10 FM, is a classical music channel from All India Radio, Bangalore. It plays everyday from 6 a.m. to 9:30 a.m. and from 6:30 pm to 11 pm. Programming includes Hindustani and Carnatic classical, light vocal and devotional songs. It is also a platform for new singers with its programme "Navapalla". There is a programme conducted for 15 minutes daily which includes carnatic classical classes; this is exclusively available in Karnataka Bengaluru.
