= Chikkalasandra =

- Neighborhood
- Location within Bengaluru
- Coordinates: 12.91°N 77.54°E
- Country: India
- State: Karnataka
- District: Bangalore
- Metro: Bangalore

Population (2011)
  - Total: 43,364

Languages
  - Official: Kannada
- Time zone: UTC+5:30 (IST)
- PIN: 560061

Chikkalasandra is a suburb of Bengaluru in the Indian state of Karnataka. Chikkalasandra is also called as " Mini Chittoor " by the locals due to its large immigrant population from nearby Chittoor district of Andhrapradesh.

== Demographics ==
As of 2011 India census, Chikkalasandra had a population of 43,364.
