= Namm Radio =

Kannada online radio station

- Broadcast area: Worldwide

Programming
- Language: Kannada
- Format: Web radio

History
- First air date: 28 February 2016; 10 years ago

Links
- Website: www.nammradio.com

Namm Radio is a Kannada online radio channel, started by Pastime Production Private Limited. Namm Radio was on trial for one month before its launch. Namm Radio was launched by Hindustani musician Nagaraja Rao Havaldar along with Col Kaushik, N.R. Vishukumar Director of Department of Information and Public Relations (Karnataka) alongside Kannada actor Chetan Kumar and Avanidhar Havaldar the Founder and CEO of NammRadio. The channel reaches an audience of 2 million listeners per month.

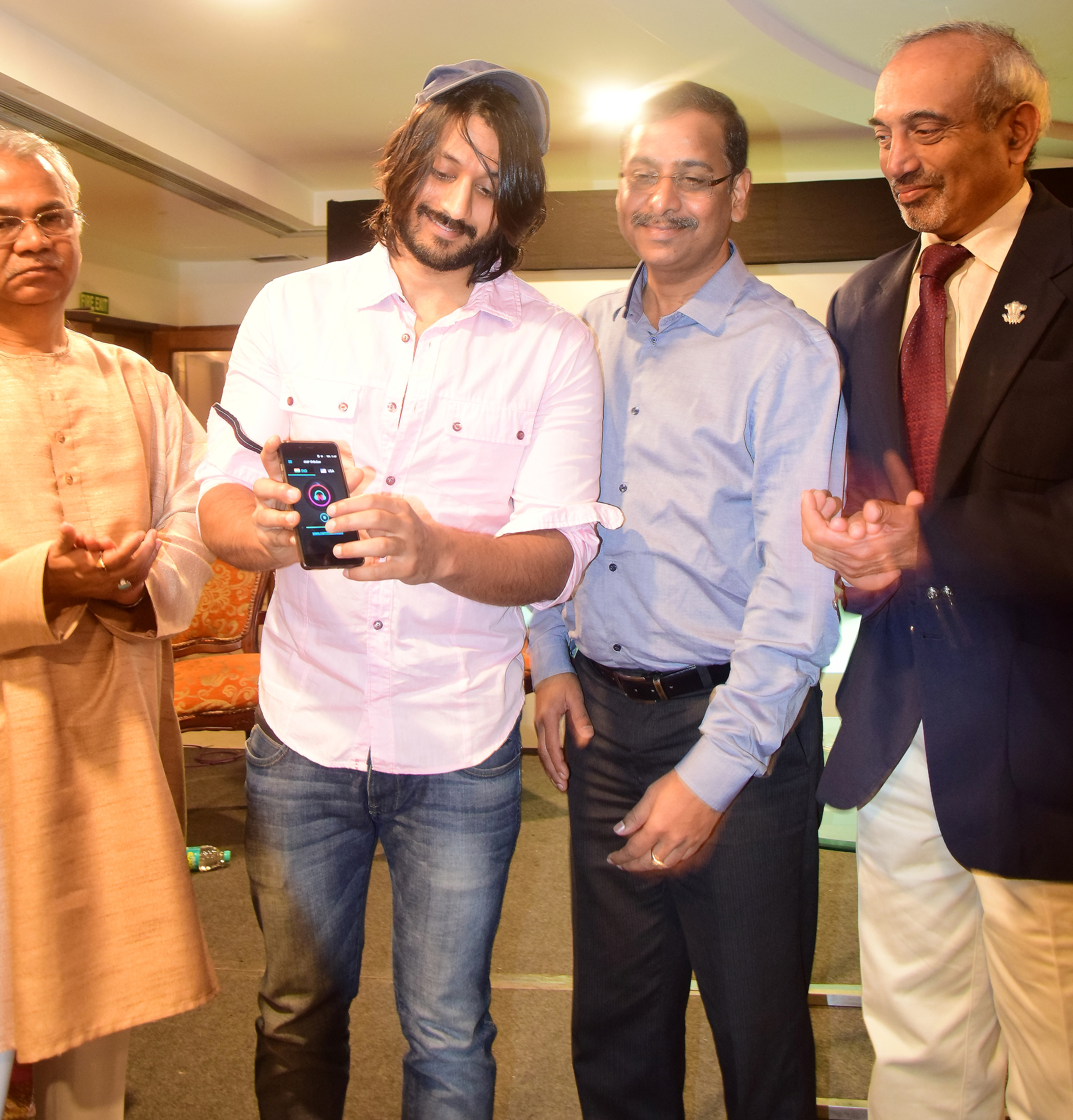
Launch of Namm Radio

== Developments ==
On 25 November 2016, Namm Radio launched its Gulf stream in a function by Shiva Rajkumar and Doddarange Gowda at Qatar Doha. On 3 November 2018 Namm Radio launched its Europe stream at United Kingdom London.

The plans to launch its 5th streaming service for Australia got delayed due to Corona Pandemic.
