= Shree Devi Entertainers =

Indian film studio

- Company type: Private
- Industry: Entertainment
- Founded: 2015
- Founder: H.K.Prakash
- Headquarters: Bangalore, Karnataka, India
- Products: Films
- Services: Film Production; Film distribution

Shree Devi Entertainers is an Indian Film production company created by H.K. Prakash, which operates in the Kannada Film Industry (KFI).

== Films produced ==
Key
†	Denotes films that have not yet been released

Year	Film	Director	Actors	Ref.
2015	RangiTaranga	Anup Bhandari	Saikumar, Nirup Bhandari, Avantika Shetty, Radhika Narayan	
2019	Katha Sangama	Kiranraj K, Chandrajith Belliappa, Shashi Kumar P, Rahul PK, Jamadagni Manoj, Karan Ananth, Jayshankar A	Rishab Shetty, Haripriya, Kishore, Yagna Shetty, Raj B. Shetty, Balaji Manohar, Pramod Shetty, Avinash, Hari Samasthi	
2019	Avane Srimannarayana	Sachin Ravi	Rakshit Shetty, Shanvi Srivastava, Achyuth Kumar, Balaji Manohar, Pramod Shetty	
2023	Spooky College	Bharath.G	Kushee Ravi, Vivek Simha	

== Awards ==
Year (Note: Refers to the year in which the ceremony was held.)	Film	Award	Category	Result	Ref
2016	RangiTaranga	Karnataka State Film Awards 2015	Best First Film of New Director	Won	
2016	RangiTaranga	63rd Filmfare Awards South	Best Film Kannada	Won	
2016	RangiTaranga	IIFA Utsavam 2015	Best Film Kannada	Won	
2016	RangiTaranga	5th SIIMA Awards	Best Film Kannada	Nominated	
2021	Avane Srimannarayana	9th SIIMA Awards	Best Film kannada	Nominated	
