= Nirup Bhandari =

Indian actor (born 1984)

- Born: 13 August 1984 (age 42); Puttur, Karnataka, India
- Education: VVIET
- Occupation: Actor
- Years active: 2015–present
- Notable work: RangiTaranga
- Spouse: Dhanya (m. 2016)
- Relatives: Anup Bhandari (Brother)

Nirup Bhandari is an Indian actor who works in Kannada cinema. He made his debut in the 2015 critically and commercially acclaimed movie RangiTaranga, directed by his brother, Anup Bhandari, with whom he frequently collaborates with.

== Early life ==
Nirup Bhandari was born on 13 August in Puttur, Karnataka to Sudhakar Bhandary and Rathna Bhandary. Later the family moved to Mysore. Nirup completed his graduation (Electronics & Communication Bachelor's degree) from Vidya Vikas Institute of Engineering & Technology (VVIET), Mysore. Upon completion of his graduation, he started working at SAP Labs India.

== Career ==
While working at SAP, Nirup started learning acting under renowned theatre personality Ratan Thakore Grant at MiSF!T school of acting. He acted in plays and short films before venturing into films.

He debuted in Anup Bhandari's directorial debut film RangiTaranga, which also starred Radhika Narayan, Avantika Shetty and Sai Kumar.

RangiTaranga turned out to be one of the biggest blockbusters. It also opened overseas market for Kannada films in a big way. It became the first Kannada film to release in many countries, the first Kannada film to appear on the New York Box Office Listing and the first and only Kannada film to run for 50 days in USA. RangiTaranga was also one of the 305 films shortlisted for the Academy Awards (The Oscars) but did not make it to the final nominations.

In 2018, he appeared in his second feature film Rajaratha directed by Anup Bhandari starring Avantika Shetty. The film is narrated from the point of view of a bus, which was voiced by Puneeth Rajkumar. The film was conceived by Anup Bhandari before RangiTaranga.

In 2019, Nirup's next film Aadi Lakshmi Puraana with Radhika Pandit directed by V. Priya hit theatres. The film received appreciation from family audiences.

In 2020, he completed work for his film Window Seat starring Amrutha Iyengar and Sanjana Anand.

Nirup Bhandari later was part of the big budget action adventure movie 'Vikrant Rona' where he shared the screen with Superstar Kichcha Sudeep. The much anticipated movie was directed by Anup Bhandari Although Nirup was not initially considered for the role, he was later brought in after Sudeep told Anup that Nirup would fit the role.

== Personal life ==
Nirup is married to Dhanya. His father, Sudhakar Bhandary, used to direct television serials. He is from Saaja a small town in Puttur. His elder brother Anup Bhandari is a director, lyricist and music composer, who has worked with Nirup in almost all of his films.

== Filmography ==
Key
†	Denotes films that have not yet been released

- Note: All films are in Kannada unless noted otherwise.

Year	Film	Roles	Notes	Ref
2015	RangiTaranga	Gautam Suvarna / Siddarth	Nominated- IIFA Utsavam Award for Best Performance in a Leading Role - Male - Kannada; Nominated - SIIMA Award for Best Debutant - Male - Kannada	
2018	Rajaratha	Abhi		
2019	Amar	Krishna Subbaiah	Cameo appearance	
2019	Aadi Lakshmi Puraana	Aadi		
2022	Window Seat	Raghu		
2022	Vikrant Rona	Sanjeev Gambhira	Nominated - SIIMA Award for Best Actor in a Negative Role - Kannada	
2025	Edagaiye Apaghatakke Karana	Raghav	Cameo appearance	
2026	America America 2	Ninad		
TBA	Amara Madhura Prema† †	TBA	Filming	
TBA	Sathya S/o Harishchandra† †	Sathya	Completed	
TBA	Anup Bhandari's next †	TBA	Filming	
