= B. Ajaneesh Loknath =

Indian composer

- Born: 1985 or 1986 (age 40–41); Bhadravati, Karnataka, India
- Genres: Film score; Filmi
- Occupations: Music producer; music director; keyboardist
- Instruments: Vocals; keyboard; guitar; drums
- Years active: 2009–present

B. Ajaneesh Loknath is an Indian music composer who works predominantly in Kannada and Telugu films. His film music career began with the 2009 Kannada film Shishira. He rose to fame with the film Ulidavaru Kandanthe (2015) for which he received the Karnataka State Film Award for Best Music Director.

He is known for his works in films such as Kirik Party (2017), Kurangu Bommai (2017), Avane Srimannarayana (2019), Dia (2020), Vikrant Rona (2022), Kantara (2022), Mangalavaaram (2023), Maharaja (2024) and Kantara: Chapter 1 (2025). He is noted for his frequent collaborations with filmmakers Rakshit Shetty, Rishab Shetty and Anup Bhandari.

== Early life ==
Ajaneesh was born in Bhadravati, Karnataka in a family of musicians. His father B. Loknath and mother Veena Loknath, both are singers and his grandmother is a Veena exponent. He took interest in music at a very young age and got professional training in Carnatic and Hindustani classical music. Starting in 2003, he initially worked as a keyboard player in Kannada cinema.

== Career ==
Ajaneesh worked as a session musician for various composers, including K. Kalyan, V. Manohar, and Benny Johnson, during his initial years (2003–2004) in Bengaluru. He later moved on to composing jingles for advertisements and television serials before getting his break as an independent film music director in the Kannada film Shishira in 2009.

Later he has composed music for Ulidavaru Kandanthe, Kirik Party, Avane Srimannarayana and background score for Rangitaranga. He has sung for Ulidavaru Kandanthe, Ishtakamya, Kirik Party and has also sung songs for his own films. He has done movies for Ramesh Aravind, Dr.Shivrajkumar, Golden Star Ganesh, Bharathiraja, Nivin Pauly, Udhayanidhi Stalin, Duniya Vijay and many others.

He got his film Ulidavaru Kandanthe assigned for eight fields in the Radio Mirchi Music Awards South 2015. His background score for the film Rangitaranga was short-listed for an Oscar but ultimately was not nominated. Till date, he has worked for more than 25 films in many languages. Ajaneesh organized a large scale live concert in Banaglore May 16, 2026 to honor his popular films and alongside the musicians he has used for his productions.

== Discography ==
Key
†	Denotes films that have not yet been released

List of film credits as composer
Year	Title	Language	Notes
2009	Shishira	Kannada	
2010	Varshadhare	Kannada	
2014	Nan Life Alli	Kannada	
2014	Ulidavaru Kandanthe	Kannada	
2015	Rangitaranga	Kannada	Background score only
2016	Ishtakamya	Kannada	
2016	Akira	Kannada	
2016	Mummy	Kannada	
2016	Kirik Party	Kannada	
2016	Sipaayi	Kannada	
2016	Sundaranga Jaana	Kannada	
2016	Cinema My Darling	Kannada	
2017	Srikanta	Kannada	
2017	Kurangu Bommai	Tamil	
2017	Richie	Tamil	
2017	Mojo	Kannada	Background score only
2017	Hombanna	Kannada	Background score only
2018	Nimir	Tamil	Two songs only
2018	Kirrak Party	Telugu	
2018	Rajaratha	Kannada	Background score only
2018	Johnny Johnny Yes Papa	Kannada	
2018	Vaasu Naan Pakka Commercial	Kannada	
2018	Nannu Dochukunduvate	Telugu	
2018	Sarkari Hi. Pra. Shaale, Kasaragodu, Koduge: Ramanna Rai	Kannada	Background score only
2019	Bell Bottom	Kannada	
2019	Padde Huli	Kannada	
2019	Avane Srimannarayana	Kannada	
2020	Dia	Kannada	
2020	Gentleman	Kannada	
2021	Hero	Kannada	
2021	Rathnan Prapancha	Kannada	
2021	Drishya 2	Kannada	
2022	By Two Love	Kannada	
2022	Vikrant Rona	Kannada	
2022	Guru Shishyaru	Kannada	
2022	Kantara	Kannada	
2022	Champion	Kannada	
2022	Gandhada Gudi	Kannada	
2022	Banaras	Kannada	
2023	Spooky College	Kannada	
2023	Gurudev Hoysala	Kannada	
2023	Raghavendra Stores	Kannada	
2023	Virupaksha	Telugu	
2023	Hostel Hudugaru Bekagiddare	Kannada	
2023	Mangalavaaram	Telugu	
2023	Kaiva	Kannada	
2024	Yuva	Kannada	
2024	Maharaja	Tamil	
2024	Bagheera	Kannada	
2024	UI	Kannada	50th film
2024	Max	Kannada	
2025	Vaamana	Kannada	
2025	Odela 2	Telugu	
2025	Arjun Son Of Vyjayanthi	Telugu	
2025	Thammudu	Telugu	
2025	Just Married	Kannada	Also producer
2025	Kantara: Chapter 1	Kannada	
2025	Devil	Kannada	
2025	Mark	Kannada	
2026	Landlord	Kannada	
2026	Sarala Subbarao	Kannada	
2026	Kattalan	Malayalam	Only one song
2026	Ananthan Kaadu	Malayalam; Tamil	Bilingual film
2026	Bail	Kannada	
2026	Vrushakarma	Telugu	

== Awards and nominations ==
List of B. Ajaneesh Loknath awards and nominations
Work	Year	Award	Category	Result	Ref.
Ulidavaru Kandanthe	2015	Karnataka State Film Awards	Best Music Director	Won	
Ulidavaru Kandanthe	2015	Filmfare Awards South	Best Music Director	Won	
Kirik Party	2017	Filmfare Awards South	Best Music Director	Won	
Kantara	2023	Filmfare Awards South	Best Music Director	Won	
RangiTaranga	2016	IIFA Utsavam	Best Background Score	Won	
Kirik Party	2017	IIFA Utsavam	Best Music Director	Won	
Kirik Party	2017	South Indian International Movie Awards	Best Music Director	Won	
Bell Bottom	2020	Mirchi Music Awards	Best Background Score	Won	
Bell Bottom	2020	Mirchi Music Awards	Viral Song Of The Year	Won	
Bell Bottom	2020	Mirchi Music Awards	Song Of The Year	Won	
Avane Srimannarayana	2020	Mirchi Music Awards	Song Of The Year	Won	
RangiTaranga	2016	Times KAFTA	Best Background Score	Won	
Kirik Party	2017	Times KAFTA	Best Music Director	Won	
Bell Bottom	2020	Chandanavana Film Critics Academy	Best Music Director	Won	
Avane Srimannarayana	2020	Chandanavana Film Critics Academy	Best Background Score	Won	
Dia	2021	Chandanavana Film Critics Academy	Best Background Score	Won	
Dia	2021	South Indian International Movie Awards	Best Music Director – Kannada	Won	
Kantara	2022	South Indian International Movie Awards	Best Music Director – Kannada	Won	
Max	2025	South Indian International Movie Awards	Best Music Director – Kannada	Won	
