= H. K. Prakash =

Kannada Film Producer and Businessman

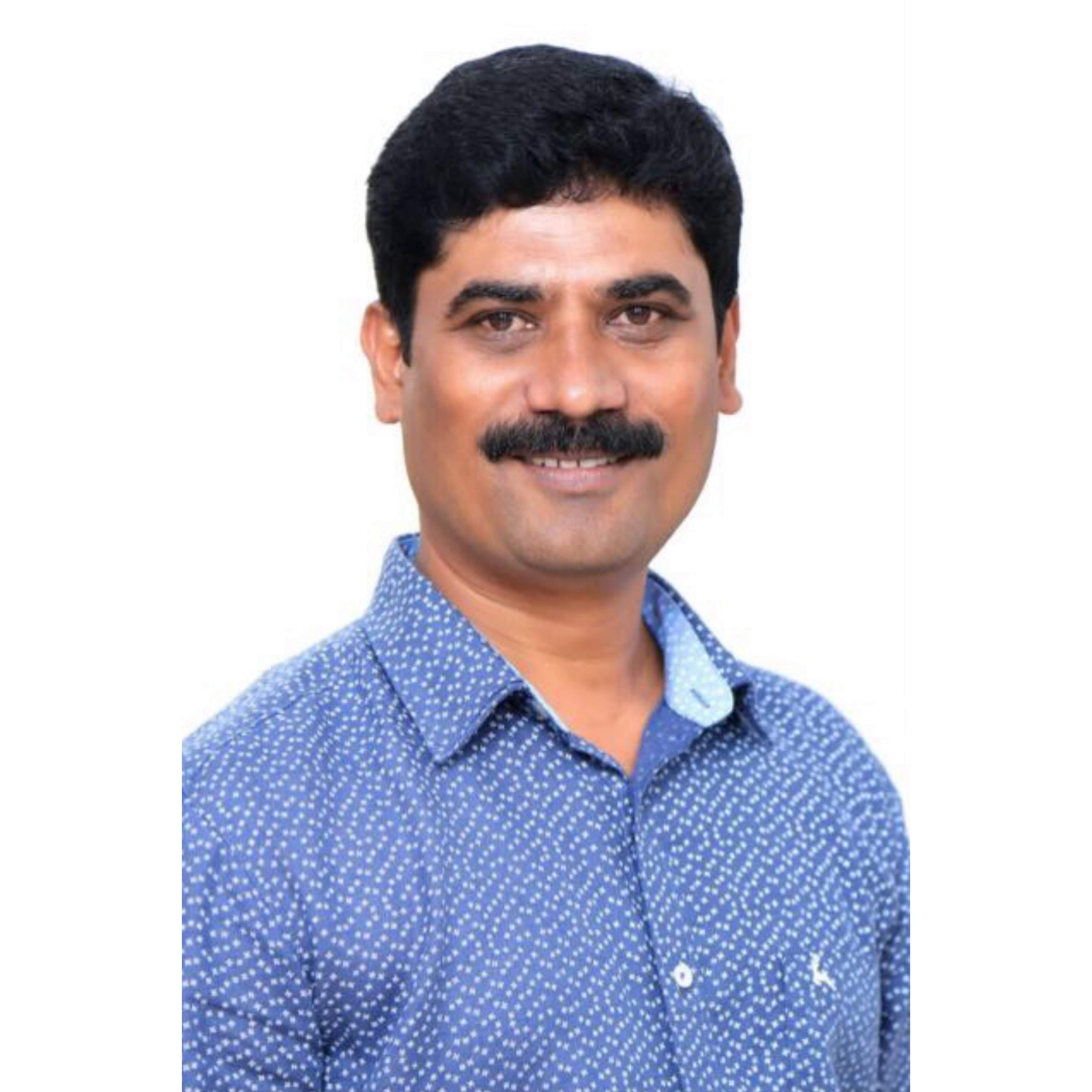
- Born: 3 October 1971 (age 54); Kunigal, Tumkur district, Karnataka, India
- Occupations: Businessman; Film Producer
- Known for: RangiTaranga

H. K. Prakash is an Indian film producer and businessman best known for his Kannada films. He has produced successful Kannada films like RangiTaranga and Avane Srimannarayana under his production banner Shree Devi Entertainers.

== Career ==
After succeeding in real estate business, Prakash entered Kannada Film Industry with the film RangiTaranga, which was directed by Anup Bhandari. RangiTaranga turned out to be one of the biggest blockbusters. It also opened overseas market for Kannada films in a big way. It became the first Kannada film to release in many countries, the first Kannada film to appear on the New York Box Office Listing and the first and only Kannada film to run for 50 days in USA. RangiTaranga was also one of the 305 films shortlisted for the Academy Awards (The Oscars) but did not make it to the final nominations.

== Filmography ==
Key
†	Denotes films that have not yet been released

Year	Film	Ref.
2015	RangiTaranga	
2019	Katha Sangama	
2019	Avane Srimannarayana	
2023	Spooky College	

== Awards ==
Year (Note: Refers to the year in which the ceremony was held.)	Film	Award	Category	Result	Ref
2016	RangiTaranga	Karnataka State Film Awards 2015	Best First Film of New Director	Won	
2016	RangiTaranga	63rd Filmfare Awards South	Best Film Kannada	Won	
2016	RangiTaranga	IIFA Utsavam 2015	Best Film Kannada	Won	
2016	RangiTaranga	5th SIIMA Awards	Best Film Kannada	Nominated	
2021	Avane Srimannarayana	9th SIIMA Awards	Best Film Kannada	Nominated	
