= Rajaratha =

- Theatrical release poster
- Directed by: Anup Bhandari
- Written by: Anup Bhandari
- Produced by: Ajay Reddy; Vishu Dakappagari; Anju Vallabh; Sathish Sastry
- Starring: Arya; Nirup Bhandari; Avantika Shetty; P. Ravishankar
- Narrated by: Puneeth Rajkumar
- Cinematography: William David
- Edited by: Sanath Kumar
- Music by: Songs: Anup Bhandari; Score: B. Ajaneesh Loknath
- Production company: Jollyhits Production
- Release date: 23 March 2018
- Running time: 143 minutes
- Country: India
- Language: Kannada

Rajaratha is a 2018 Indian Kannada-language romantic comedy film written and directed by Anup Bhandari, who also composed the film's music. It stars Arya, Nirup Bhandari, Avantika Shetty in the lead roles in their second collaboration with the director after the success of RangiTaranga. Arya, who made his debut in Kannada cinema with the film in a lead role, alongside P. Ravishankar. While the film score is composed by B. Ajaneesh Loknath, the soundtrack is composed by Anup Bhandari. The cinematography is by William David.

The film was released on March 23, 2018. The film was dubbed in Telugu as Rajaratham (transl. Royal Chariot) with Rana Daggubati replacing Puneeth Rajkumar as the narrator.

== Plot ==
The story starts in a bus named Rajaratha. Abhi (Nirup Bhandari) is a fun-loving person whose passion lies in writing poems. His love interest is Megha (Avantika Shetty). Her mother is a Tamilian, and father is from Telangana. She was born in Kerala and brought up in Bangalore. Both are from the same college. Their past unfolds. The first time Abhi sees Megha is during the time of his college admission. From then he is in love with her, but he is scared to reveal it. In the fourth semester, he finds that she is in love with another guy from the same college named Suraj. Back in the present, she befriends him.

There is a parallel story running at the same time. It is about Vishwa (Arya), a member of a political party named Praja Rakshana Dal. The leaders of the party were involved in scams. To disclose this issue, the party draws the attention of people by claiming that Periyapelli originally belongs to Tamil Nadu as Karnataka's. While in the protest, Apanna, a prominent leader, is slapped by Tamilian. Vishwa takes the leadership of the protest.

Meanwhile, the bus is blocked in the middle of a forest. Megha and Abhi decide to go out to record a song, but they lost their way. It is then revealed to the audience that Vishwa and Abhi are siblings. Vishwa loves his brother dearly but does not show it. Then, Abhi finds Megha in a jeep with two men who he presumes as kidnappers. He runs after the vehicle and fights against the men. Then, she stops him and reveals that the men are the assistants of her uncle (P. Ravi Shankar). After a humorous chat, he decides to drop Megha and Abhi back to the bus. They stay in a resort for a day. It is revealed that most of the co-passengers in the bus are somehow connected in his life.

In the meantime, Vishwa calls Abhi and asks him to get down in Bangalore and lies to him that his father is not well. Believing this, Abhi agrees to do so, but he gets to know about the lie from his mother (Aruna Balraj). He returns to the bus, which reaches near Periapelli. Abhi was about to propose to Megha, giving the plastic ring which she liked in the jewelry shop. However, rioters burn the vehicles, including the bus. Later, it is revealed that Vishwa was also a part of this violence. Abhi, getting to know this, confronts him as to why is he doing this. Abhi saves most of the passengers and also Megha when a few people tried to molest her. Later, it is then revealed that a baby boy was stuck inside the bus. Megha goes to save him, and Abhi goes along with her. They rescue the baby and hand it over to Vishwa. The bus then explodes as the co-passengers and Vishwa cry, presuming them to be dead.

The film ends with a note that violence is harmful and leads to the deaths of our own loved ones. Media channels expose the politicians behind the Periapalli massacre. The people of Karnataka and Tamil Nadu do a candle march. The film fast-forwards by five years. Vishwa is shown lighting a lamp in front of a photo of his friend. Here, we see Megha (with a slightly-burnt plastic ring in hand which Abhi was about to put on her) and Abhi living together happily. The burnt marks on their bodies were still visible. The boy, Aadhi, who was saved by them, comes to meet them. It is now revealed that the duo runs an orphanage with the name of Rajaratha. The board of the bus is kept and used as the name plate of the orphanage.

== Cast ==
- Arya as Vishwa, a gangleader, Abhi's Elder Brother
- Nirup Bhandari as Abhi, Vishwa's Younger Brother
- Avantika Shetty as Megha, Abhi's love interest
- P. Ravishankar as Megha's uncle
- Puneeth Rajkumar as Rajaratha (voice role)
- Vinaya Prasad as Usha, jewelry shop owner
- Sudhakar Saaja as Abhi and Vishwa's father
- Aruna Balraj as Abhi and Vishwa's mother
- M. G. Naresh as Tandav Murthy
- Srivatsa as Harsha
- Sanjay Suri
- Sruthi Hariharan as Media Reporter (guest appearance)
- Anup Bhandari as Media Reporter (guest appearance)

== Soundtrack ==
Rajaratha

Soundtrack album by Anup Bhandari
- Released: 2018
- Recorded: 2017
- Genre: Feature film soundtrack
- Length: 21:26
- Language: Kannada
- Labels: Jollyhits, Divo & Saregama
- Producer: Anup Bhandari

Anup Bhandari chronology
RangiTaranga (2015)	Rajaratha (2018)

Anup Bhandari has composed the songs and The background score was composed by B. Ajaneesh Loknath.

All tracks are written by Anup Bhandari.

Track-List
No.	Title	Singer(s)	Length
1.	"Gandaka"	Anup Bhandari, Ravishankar, Inchara Rao	3:23
2.	"College Days"	Nakul Abhyankar	5:00
3.	"Appi Tappi"	Deepak Doddera	4:48
4.	"Hele Meghave"	Abhay Jodhpurkar	4:22
5.	"Banana"	Anup Bhandari	1:40
6.	"Saago Saago"	Deepak Doddera	2:13
7.	"Mundhe Banni"	Anup Bhandhari	2:43
Total length:			24:09

Telugu Track-List
No.	Title	Lyrics	Singer(s)	Length
1.	"Chal Chal Gurram"	Ramajogayya Sastry	Anup Bhandari, Ravishankar, Inchara Rao	3:23
2.	"College Days"	Ramajogayya Sastry	Nakul Abhyankar	5:00
3.	"Ninnu Nenu"	Ramajogayya Sastry	Anup Bhandari	4:48
4.	"Neeli Meghama"	Ramajogayya Sastry	Abhay Jodhpurkar	4:19
5.	"Banana"	Anup Bhandari	Anup Bhandari	1:40
6.	"Saago Saago"	Ramajogayya Sastry	Deepak Doddera	2:13
Total length:				21:23

== Controversy ==
During Rajaratha pre release promotions, an innocent comment made by the director Anup Bhandari, his brother Nirup Bhandari and actress Avantika Shetty was taken out of context and made to appear as derogatory comments against audience who didn't wish to watch the film. The trio issued an apology after Karnataka Film Chamber of Commerce (KFCC) condemned their comments.
