= Words (film) =

- Directed by: Anup S Bhandari
- Produced by: L N Murthy
- Starring: Russell Harvard
- Cinematography: Lance Kaplan
- Edited by: V Pavan Kumar
- Music by: Eduoard Brenneisen
- Production company: Golden Summer Productions
- Release date: 2010
- Running time: 14 minutes
- Countries: United States; India

Words is a 2010 short film directed by Anup S Bhandari and starring Russell Harvard. An Indo-American co-production, it is a dialogues film with the central characters communicating via American Sign Language.

== Plot ==
The film follows deaf-mute Owen and Juliet, who meet at the Bethesda Fountain in Central Park. They communicate with each other in sign language and slowly, their love for each other blossoms into friendship.

== Cast ==
- Russell Harvard as Owen
- Miriam Liora Ganz as Juliet

== Production ==
Anup Bhandari based the film on a conversation he had with his friend Carl. Carl's wife was a sign language interpreter, which formed the basis of Juliet's character. After screen-testing eighty people across Massachusetts, New York and New Jersey, he decided to cast deaf actor Russell Harvard after seeing There Will Be Blood (2007) for the character of Owen. Harvard agreed to work on the film for free since he was doing it for passion and not for money. Producer Lakshmi Narayan faced issues transferring the money to produce the film from India to the United States from the Reserve Bank of India, but when he told them he was making a Hollywood film with an Indian director and producer, he was given the clearance. The film was shot at Bethesda Fountain in Central Park for five days. Cinematographer Lance Kaplan called the film's story a daydream since it was set in snow-ridden Central Park, a location that was foreign to Bhandari.

== Release ==
In 2010, the film was released and was Anup Bhandari's only short film that he released online. For the premiere of the film, Anup Bhandari invited Sudeep, who said he was willing to collaborate with him after seeing the film. Producer H. K. Prakash agreed to work on his feature film debut after seeing the film.

== Accolades ==
Words won the Best Art Direction award at the 6th Toronto International Deaf Film & Arts Festival in 2011 and was screened at thirteen film festivals.
