= Kalpana 2 =

- Poster
- Directed by: R. Anantha Raju
- Story by: Raghava Lawrence
- Based on: Kanchana 2 (Tamil) by Raghava Lawrence
- Produced by: Dr. Rajendra K. M. Shilpa Srinivas; Swamee
- Starring: Upendra; Priyamani; Avantika Shetty
- Cinematography: M. R. Seenu
- Edited by: Johny Harsha
- Music by: Arjun Janya
- Production company: Rajendra Movies
- Release date: 15 July 2016
- Running time: 150 minutes
- Country: India
- Language: Kannada

Kalpana 2 is a 2016 Indian Kannada-language horror comedy film directed by R. Anantha Raju and produced by Dr. Rajendra, Shilpa Srinivas and Swamee. It is the second installment after Kalpana and is a remake of the Tamil film Kanchana 2. The film features Upendra, Priyamani and Avantika Shetty in the lead roles. The film's musical score is by Arjun Janya.

== Plot ==
Cinematographer Raghav (Upendra) who is scared of ghosts and darkness ends up accompanying Nandini (Avantika Shetty), the girl he fancies, to shoot a reality show about a fake haunted house. As luck would have it, the house ends up being actually haunted and there's more than just adventure that awaits them.

== Cast ==
- Upendra as Raghav and Jade Shiva (double role)
- Priyamani as Kalpana
- Avantika Shetty as Nandini
- Prakash Heggodu
- Victory Vasu
- Ramesh Bhat
- Tulasi Shivamani
- Chitra Shenoy
- Vinaya Prakash
- Muni
- Petrol Prasanna
- Kuri Prathap
- Kuri Rangateja
- Gym Ravi
- Prashanth Siddi
- Mohan Juneja
- R. Anantharaju
- K. M. Rajendra as Special Appearance
- Kaddipudi Chandru
- Ramesh Babu
- B. Jaya
- Kote Prabhakar
- Joe Simon
- Ramesh Pandit
- Jyothi Muroor
- Anusha Sriharsha
- Chirashree Anchan

== Production ==
In August 2015, following the success of Upendra's venture Uppi 2, he signed to appear in Kalpana 2 with Naganna directing and Shilpa Srinivas producing. The film was initially planned to start production in September 2015. However the director walked out and R. Anantha Raju replaced him with Dr. Rajendra of Kalla Police fame agreeing to join the production team. The film officially began in November 2015 at the Bull Temple in Bangalore. Actress Priyamani played the role essayed by Nithya Menen in the original version. Avantika Shetty of Rangi Taranga fame got her second assignment from Upendra to reprise the role originally played by Taapsee Pannu in the Tamil film. During a shoot of a Kabaddi match for the film, Upendra sprained his ankle.

== Release ==
The film was dubbed and released in Telugu as Kalpana 3 (2017).

== Soundtrack ==
The film's score and soundtrack is composed by Arjun Janya. In April 2016, it was reported that actor Puneeth Rajkumar had lent his voice for a patriotic song penned by V. Nagendra Prasad and that would be the introductory song.

No.	Title	Lyrics	Singers	Length
1.	"Nan Sigdhakadru Kannada"	V. Nagendra Prasad	Puneeth Rajkumar
2.	"Lightaagi"	K. Kalyan	Vijay Prakash, Indu Nagaraj
3.	"H2O Kudidivni Baare"	Kaviraj	Upendra, Aishwarya Rangarajan
4.	"Muneshwara"	V. Nagendra Prasad	Shankar Mahadevan, Arjun Janya
