= William David =

Indian cinematographer (born 1983)

- Born: William David; 26 June 1985 (age 41) Spouse= poornima Sakleshpura, Karnataka, India
- Occupation: Cinematographer
- Years active: 1999–present
- Spouse: Poornima (2015)

William David (born 26 June 1983 in Sakleshpur) is an Indian cinematographer, who is best known for his work in RangiTaranga with director Anup Bhandari.

== Career ==
William started his career working as a co-DOP for commercials. He has experience in working in Kannada, Hindi and all other leading Indian regional film industries. He has worked on a few films, commercials for top Indian brands and live studio shows with leading singers and corporate film makers. William is known for his death defying acrobats behind the scenes, going to any extent in order to ensure he delivers the shot as it is imagined by his Director. He would find some humanely impossible spots to place his camera and achieve brilliant output while ensuring the safety of his equipment. William started work in Kannada cinema in 2008 with Shivashankar produced "Shivani" as a cinematographer. Post which he has also worked with N Venugopal Nayak in 2009 starrer "Minchu", which was a remake of the Tamil movie Thimiru (2006). Prior to working in Kannada cinema, he has worked in Hindi as well as Marathi films.

=== Work with Rangitaranga ===
William is best known for his work with Rangitaranga, 2015 where he worked as a DOP with famed director Anup Bhandari. The film opened to overwhelmingly positive response from audiences and critics alike. Critics acclaimed the film's screenplay, direction, film score, cinematography and the acting performance of Saikumar. The film made it into the list of productions eligible for the 88th Academy Awards but did not make it into nomination list. Writing for Deccan Herald, S. Viswanath called the film "[a]n eerie romantic thriller". On the cinematography, he wrote, "... Lance Kaplan and William David capture the verdant and scenic vicissitudes of mountainous ravines and quietly flowing rivers of coastal Mangaluru, as also the famous tea gardens and hills of Ooty." Sunayana Suresh of The Times of India rated the film 3/5 and wrote, "... B Ajaneesh Lokanath's background score is on par with some of the best global thrillers, as is the cinematography by Lance Kaplan and William David." William along with Lance were nominated for Times KAFTA, 2015 for Best Cinematographer for the same movie.

=== Post Rangitaranga ===
After getting acclaimed for Rangitaranga, William has worked independently on an upcoming Indian Kannada romantic comedy film, Rajaratha as a cinematographer. The movie also marks the Kannada film debut of Tamil actor Arya who plays a major supporting role in it and got released in December 2017. William has also worked as cinematographer in Kannada movie "Nanobne Ollevnu" which was released in July 2017. William then worked on a closed script suspense thriller movie, which was released in 2017. William David currently has worked on action adventure, fantasy, thriller; the most awaited Indian Sandalwood original cinema Vikrant Rona, which is set to release on 24 July 2022.

== Filmography ==
Key
| † | Denotes films that have not yet been released |

| Year | Film | Notes |
|---|---|---|
| 2008 | Shivani | |
| 2009 | Minchu | |
| 2015 | Rangitaranga | Nominated for Times KAFTA, 2015 for Best Cinematographer nominated |
| 2017 | Nanobne Ollevnu | |
| 2018 | Rajaratha | |
| 2018 | Iruvudellava Bittu | |
| 2022 | Avatara Purusha | |
| 2022 | Vikrant Rona | |
| 2024 | Avatara Purusha 2 | |
| 2025 | Gatha Vaibhava | |
| 2026 | Rakkasapuradhol | |
| 2026 | KD - The Devil | |
| TBA | Mr. Natwarlal | |
