= Abhay Jodhpurkar =

Indian singer

Background information
- Born: 1991 (age 34–35); Sendhwa, Madhya Pradesh
- Genres: Indian classical music, Filmi
- Website: http://www.abhayjodhpurkar.in/

Abhay Jodhpurkar (born 1991) is an Indian singer born in Madhya Pradesh. He debuted as a playback singer with the Kannada film God Father in 2012. In 2018, he sang "Mere Naam Tu" for Zero, which marks his singing debut in Hindi cinema. He is best known for his song "Moongil Thottam", a duet with Harini for the Tamil film Kadal and "E Sanje Eke Jaruthide" for the Kannada film RangiTaranga. He is recipient of a National Film Award.

He also sang in the song Barse Re the Hindi version of Aye Bristi of the Upcoming Bengali Action Drama Film Manush which will release on 24 November in Bengali with its dubbed version in Hindi.

== Early and personal life ==
Abhay Jodhpurkar completed his bachelor's in biotechnology from SRM Institute of Science and Technology, Chennai in 2013. Schooling at Vidyasagar School, Indore which is one of the best schools of the country.

== Singing career ==
Abhay has learnt Qawwali for two years and got the opportunity to sing on A.R. Rahman's Sufi albums. Abhay learnt Hindustani classical music for 3 years at Alaap music academy, Chennai, from Kuldeep Sagar. His music journey started when he got into A.R. Rahman's school KM Music Conservatory. He started singing in different languages including Tamil, Telugu, Kannada, Marathi and Malayalam, as well as Hindi.

== Discography ==
Denotes films that have not yet been released

Year	Film	Song	Music	Co-singers	Language	Note
2012	Godfather	"Aalapane Mellane"	A. R. Rahman	Maria Roe Vincent, Blaaze	Kannada	
2012	Godfather	"Deepavali"	A. R. Rahman	Sonu Kakkar, Apoorva, Swetha Majethiya, Arun Haridas Kamath	Kannada	
2012	Godfather	"Neene Ee Kanna"	A. R. Rahman	Chinmayi	Kannada	
2012	Konjam Koffee Konjam Kaadhal	"Uyir Thozi"	Phani Kalyan	Nivas, Gayathri SG, Shakthisree Gopalan, Phani Kalyan	Tamil	
2013	Kadal	"Moongil Thottam"	A. R. Rahman	Harini	Tamil	
2013	Kadal	"Patchani Thotta"	A. R. Rahman	Harini	Telugu (dubbed)	
2013	Endrendrum Punnagai	"Othayilae"	Harris Jayaraj	Tippu	Tamil	
2013	Rummy	"Adiye Yenna Raagam"	D. Imman	Poornima	Tamil	
2013	Naveena Saraswathi Sabatham	"Kaathirundhai Anbe"	Prem Kumar	Chinmayi	Tamil	
2013	Chirunavvula Chirujallu	"Ontariga"	Harris Jayaraj		Telugu	
2013	Thalaivaa	"Sol Sol"	G. V. Prakash Kumar	Vijay Prakash, Megha, Harini	Tamil	
2014	Aaha Kalyanam	"Nuvvo Sagam"(Female)	Dharan Kumar		Telugu	
2014	Pattaya Kelappanum Pandiya	"Yean Vizhundhai"	Aruldev		Tamil	
2014	Anegan	"Aathadi Aathadi"	Harris Jayaraj	Bhavatharini, Dhanush, Tippu	Tamil	
2014	Thegidi	"Vinmeen"	Nivas K. Prasanna	Saindhavi	Tamil	
2014	Bhadram	"Valapai Virise"	Nivas K. Prasanna	Saindhavi	Telugu (dubbed)	
2014	Maine Pyar Kiya	"Adiginde"	Pradeep Kumar	Kalyani Nair	Telugu	
2014	Nee Jathaga Nenundali	"Nijama Kaada"	Jeet Gannguli	Palak Muchhal	Telugu	
2014	Jeeva	"Oruthi Mele"	D. Imman		Tamil	
2014	Oru Oorla Rendu Raja	"Odum Rayilai"	D. Imman		Tamil	
2015	RangiTaranga	"Ee Sanje Yaake"	Anup Bhandari	Gokul Abhishek, Monisha	Kannada	
2015	Prime Time	"Tujhya Vina"	Niranjan Pedgaonkar	Savani Ravindra	Marathi	
2015	Double Seat	"Man Phiruni"	Jasraj, Saurabh, Hrishikesh	Savani Ravindra	Marathi	
2015	Kanche	"Itu itu itu"	Chirantan Bhatt	Shreya Ghoshal	Telugu	
2016	Kalam	"Anuvai Philanthai"	Prakash Nikki	Shweta Mohan	Tamil	
2016	Aakashvani	"Kaalam"	Sreeshankar	Anna Kathrina	Malayalam	
2016	A Aa	"Yaa Yaa"	Mickey J Meyer	K. S. Chithra, Anjana Sowmya	Telugu	
2016	Brahmotsavam	"Vacchindi kada Avakasam"	Mickey J Meyer		Telugu	
2016	Okka Ammayi Thappa	"Yegirenay Yegirenay"	Mickey J Meyer	Ramya Behara	Telugu	
2016	Okka Ammayi Thappa	"Kav Kav"	Mickey J Meyer	Haricharan	Telugu	
2016	Iru Mugan	"Helena"	Harris Jayaraj	Christopher Stanley	Tamil	
2016	Inkokkadu	"Chilaka O Chilaka"	Harris Jayaraj	Christopher Stanley	Telugu (dubbed)	
2016	Veeri Veeri Gummadi Pandu	"You Are My Angel"	Peddapalli Rohith		Telugu	
2017	Jomonte Suvisheshangal	"Nokki Nokki"	Vidyasagar	Merin Gregory	Malayalam	
2017	Cheliyaa	"Allei Allei"	A. R. Rahman	Chinmayi	Telugu (dubbed)	
2017	Ivan Yarendru Therikiratha	"Aala Paaru Aala"	N. R. Raghunanthan	Vaishali Jayashankar	Tamil	
2017	Vanamagan	"Pachai Uduthiya Kaadu"	Harris Jayaraj	Harini	Tamil	
2017	Rajaratha	"Hele Meghave"	Anup Bhandari		Kannada	
2017	Vellipomakey	"Yemo Ye Vaipo"	Prashanth R Vihari		Telugu	
2018	Koode	"Minnaminni"	M.Jayachandran		Malayalam	
2018	NOTA	"Raja Raja Kula"	Srimaini	Nityashree Mahadevan	Telugu	
2018	Zero	"Mere Naam Tu"	Ajay–Atul		Hindi	
2018	Thimiru Pudichavan	"Kannadi"	Vijay Antony	Padmalatha	Tamil	
2018	Kolamaavu Kokila	"Kalyaana Vayasu"	Anirudh Ravichander		Tamil	
2018	Roshagadu	"Kavale Kavale"	Vijay Antony		Telugu	
2018	Co Co Kokila	"Pelleedu Vachinidhani"	Anirudh Ravichander		Telugu	
2018	Pedhavi Datani Maatokatundhi	"Easy Easy"	Zenith Reddy		Telugu	
2018	Rajaratham	"Neeli Meghama"	Anup Bhandari		Telugu	
2018	Idi Naa Love Story	"Naa Hrudayamlo"	Srinath Vijay		Telugu	
2019	The Fakir of Venice	"Wako Naam Fakir"	A. R. Rahman	A. R. Rahman, Arjun Chandy	Hindi	English film
2019	Panipat	"Sapna Hai Sach Hai"	Ajay–Atul	Shreya Ghoshal	Hindi	
2019	Indu Aur Woh Chitthi	"Kya Pataa"	Shubhankar		Hindi	Short film
2019	Panther: Hindustan Meri Jaan	"Marhaba"	Amit-Ishan	Nikhita Gandhi, Shovon Ganguly	Bengali	
2020	Bombhaat	"Nuvvante Ishtamante"	Joshyabhatla Rajashekar Sharma		Telugu	
2020	Neevalle Nenunna	"Ninnu Vethike"	Sidhartha Sadhasivuni		Telugu	
2020	Zam Zam	"Ellarum Pirinju"	Amit Trivedi		Malayalam	
2021	Haseen Dillruba	"Milaa Yun"	Amit Trivedi	Yashita Sharma	Hindi	Netflix film
2021	Meenakshi Sundareshwar	"Tu Yahin Hai"	Justin Prabhakaran	Madhushree, Resmi Sateesh	Hindi	Netflix film
2021	Meenakshi Sundareshwar	"Ratti Ratti Reza Reza"	Justin Prabhakaran	Shreya Ghoshal	Hindi	Netflix film
2022	FIR	"Payanam"	Aswanth		Tamil	
2022	FIR	"Payanam"	Aswanth		Telugu (dubbed)	
2022	Degala Babji	"Kalale Kannane"	Lynus		Telugu	
2022	Aa Ammayi Gurinchi Meeku Cheppali	"Kottha Kotthaga"	Vivek Sagar	Chaitra Ambadipudi	Telugu	
2022	Badhaai Do	"Hum Thay Seedhe Sadhe"	Amit Trivedi		Hindi	
2022	Badhaai Do	"Mange Manzooriyan (Male)"	Khamosh Shah		Hindi	
2022	Dr. Arora	"Khaalipan"	Niladri Kumaar	Meenal Jain	Hindi	Web Series
2022	Solamante Theneechakal	"Aanandamo"	Vidyasagar	Anwesshaa	Malayalam	
2022	Viswasam	"Kehna Hai Mujhko"	D. Imman		Hindi (dubbed)	
2022	O Kala	"Selayeti"	Neelesh Mandalapu	Nikhita Gandhi, Arun Kaundinya	Telugu	
2022	O Kala	"Tholimanchule"	Neelesh Mandalapu	Wrisha Dutta	Telugu	
2022	Rudra Veena	"Bangaru Bomma"	Mahaveer		Telugu	
2022	Brahmāstra	"Rasiya (Sad)"	Pritam		Hindi	
2022	Doctor G	"Ek Boond"	Amit Trivedi	Madhubani Bagchi	Hindi	
2022	Doctor	"Gudiya Re"	Anirudh Ravichander		Hindi (dubbed)	
2022	Doctor	"So Baby"	Anirudh Ravichander		Hindi (dubbed)	
2022	Emaipoyave	"Marichedi Nenela"	Ram Charan Gadicherla		Telugu	
2022	Masooda	"Chukkalni Thaake"	Prashanth R Vihari		Telugu	
2022	Mookuthi Amman	"Rooh Se Dekha Tujhko"	Girishh G.		Hindi (dubbed)	
2023	Almost Pyaar with DJ Mohabbat	"Duniya"	Amit Trivedi		Hindi	
2023	Sindhooram	"Anandhamo Aaveshamo"	Gowra Hari		Telugu	
2023	Manush: Child of Destiny	"Aay Bristi"	Aneek Dhar	Shreya Ghosal	Bengali	
2023	Manush: Child of Destiny	"Barse Re"	Aneek Dhar	Shreya Ghosal	Hindi	
2023	Tiger 3	"Prathi Kanam Kanam"	Pritam		Telugu(dubbed)	
2023	Pahije Jatiche	Chalalo	Anwesha DuttaGupta		Marathi	
2023	Baaplyok	Feeling lai bhari	Vijay Gavande		Marathi	
2023	Chhapa Kata	Kuni samjava majhya manala	Mukul kashikar	Aarya Ambekar	Marathi	
2024	Haddhu Ledhu Raa	"Friendship"	Kamal Kumar D		Telugu	
2024	Tera Kya Hoga Lovely	"Mann Lovely Ho Gaya"	Amit Trivedi	Madhubanti Bagchi	Hindi	
2024	Kanni	Man baware	Vishal Shelake	Kirti Killedar	Marathi	
2024	Sridevi Prasanna	Harun gele	Amitraj	Solo	Marathi	
2024	Apsara	Ok madhi fine	Mangesh Kangane	Solo	Marathi	
2024	Khurchi	Gungala asa	Abhishek kate	Amita Ghugri	Marathi	
2024	Bai Ga	Chaand Thambla	Varun Likhate	Anandi Joshi	Marathi	
2024	Gharat Ganpati	Navsachi gauri majhi	Sanket sane		Marathi	
2025	SuSheela SuJeet	Naughty Naughty	Varun Likhate	Mugdha Karhade	Marathi	
2025	Aap Jaisa Koi	Saare Jag Mein	Justin Prabhakaran	Aanandi Joshi	Hindi	
2026	Swapnasundari	"Fulto Jasa Mogra"	Ankush Boradkar	Reeshika Mukherjee	Marathi	
2026	Adkitta	"Gheun Ye"	Hrishikesh Datar		Marathi	
2026	Aali Mothi Shahani	"Ganesh Vandana"	Pankaj Padghan		Marathi	
2026	Modha Rathri	Mudhala Mudiva	Bharat Sankar	Saindhavi	Tamil	
2026	Ramayana	Mangala Vanname	A. R. Rahman	Saindhavi	Tamil	

== Awards ==
Year	Award	Category	Film	Song	Result	Ref.
2019	64th Filmfare Awards	Best Male Playback Singer	Zero	"Mera Naam Tu"	Nominated	
2019	20th IIFA Awards	Best Male Playback Singer	Zero	"Mera Naam Tu"	Nominated	
2019	2019 Zee Cine Awards	Best Male Playback Singer	Zero	"Mera Naam Tu"	Nominated	
2019	11th Mirchi Music Awards	Upcoming Male Vocalist Of The Year	Zero	"Mera Naam Tu"	Won	
2022	Mirchi Music Awards Marathi	Film Male Vocalist Of The Year	Dhurala	"Kaakana Kinkin"	Nominated	
2022	Mirchi Music Awards Marathi	Film Male Vocalist Of The Year	Preetam	"Kona Maga Bhir"	Won	
2024	National Film Awards	Best Male Playback Singer	Gharat Ganpati	"Navsachi Gauri Majhi"	Won	
2025	Zee Chitra Gaurav Puraskar	Best Playback Singer – Male	Gharat Ganpati	"Navsachi Gauri Majhi"	Nominated	
2025	Filmfare Marathi Awards	Best Male Playback Singer	Gharat Ganpati	"Navsachi Gauri Majhi"	Nominated	
