= Aadi Lakshmi Puraana =

2019 film by V. Priya

- Directed by: V. Priya
- Written by: V. Priya
- Produced by: Rockline Venkatesh
- Starring: Nirup Bhandari; Radhika Pandit
- Cinematography: Preetha Jayaraman
- Edited by: Jo. Ni. Harsha
- Music by: Anup Bhandari
- Production company: Rockline Entertainment Pvt Ltd.
- Release date: 19 July 2019
- Running time: 122 minutes
- Country: India
- Language: Kannada

Aadi Lakshmi Puraana is a 2019 Indian Kannada-language romantic action comedy film written & directed by V. Priya and produced by Rockline Venkatesh. The film stars Nirup Bhandari and Radhika Pandit, alongside Tara, Suchendra Prasad, Joe Simon, Bharath Kalyan and Sowmya Jaganmurthy. The music was composed by Anup Bhandari, while cinematography and editing were handled by Preetha Jayaraman and Jo. Ni. Harsha.

Aadi Lakshmi Purana was theatrically released on 19 July 2019 to mixed reviews from critics and became a financial disappointment. It marked the final film of Radhika Pandit before her hiatus from acting.

== Plot ==
Aaditya alias Aadi, an covert operative in NCB, is working with his team to bust down drug peddlers, who are supplying LSD in Bangalore. Aadi meets Lakshmi, a travel agent, and falls in love with her, but Aadi is unaware of Lakshmi's inferiority complex and her habit of cooking up lies for some reasons. When Lakshmi lies to Aadi about her being a single mother, Aadi decides to accept her with her baggage, while also uncovering the boss of the drug peddlers.

Lakshmi learns about Aadi's true profession and gets scared to reveal the truth as Aadi hates lies. Aadi soon learns about Lakshmi's inferiority complex, where he breaksup with Lakshmi. Aadi and his team captures some of the drug peddlers and soon uncovers the identity of peddlers' boss Runo Sukoulam, who is the head of Russian mafia. Aadi learns about Sukoulam's meeting in a resort at Goa. Aadi's parents learn about Lakshmi and tries to convince Aadi to reunite with her, but Aadi refuses and leaves for Goa.

Aadi's parents meets Lakshmi, who doesn't know about Aadi's parents, and seeks her help to convince their son. Aadi and his team, while observing Sukoulam, finds Lakshmi and Aadi's family in the resort as Aadi's family learnt about his location earlier. Lakshmi unknowingly reveals Aadi's identity to Sukoulam in a drunken state. A gunfight ensues in which Aadi and his team kills Sukoulam and his men. Aadi accepts Lakshmi's condition and proposes to her, where the couple reunite.

== Cast ==
- Nirup Bhandari as Aditya alias Aadi
- Radhika Pandit as Lakshmi
- Tara as Shanthamma, Aadi's mother
- Suchendra Prasad as Ramegowda, Aadi's father
- Yashwanth Shetty as Eashwer
- Bharath Kalyan as Ravi
- Sowmya Jaganmurthy as Savitha
- Joe Simon
- Vishal Nayer as Chaddha
- Krishna Nadig
- Raj Deepak Shetty as Sukesh
- Nawab Shah as Runo Sukoulam
- Maghu Hegde

== Reception ==
Professional ratings
Review scores
Source	Rating
The Times of India	3.5/5 stars
Bangalore Mirror	3/5 stars
The New Indian Express	2.5/5 stars

Sunayana Suresh of The Times of India gave 3.5/5 stars and wrote "Aadi Lakshmi Puraana is a fun, romcom that does strike that familiar chord. The narrative works for those who like love stories, but a little taut storytelling could have ensured a seamlessly screenplay. Though, the clever subversion of a massy story into a romcom is laudable." Shyam Prasad S of Bangalore Mirror gave 3/5 stars and wrote "At two hours, Aadi Lakshmi does not burden your time and does not overwhelm you in any manner." Aravind Shwetha from The News Minute wrote "With its unique, contemporary content and essential entertaining elements, Aadi Lakshmi Purana is a fun watch." A. Sharadhaa from The New Indian Express gave 2.5/5 stars and wrote "Aadi Lakshmi Purana belongs to the director and makes for a total family entertainer that will cater to all kinds of audience."
