= Avatara Purusha 2 =

2024 Indian Kannada-language supernatural comedy-thriller film

Avatara Purusha
- Theatrical release poster
- Directed by: Suni
- Written by: Suni; Sheelam M Swamy; Kiran; Arjun
- Story by: Suni
- Produced by: Pushkara Mallikarjunaiah
- Starring: Sharan; Ashika Ranganath
- Cinematography: William David
- Edited by: Manu Shedgar
- Music by: Abhinandan Kashyap
- Production company: Pushkar Films
- Distributed by: Pushkar Films; Mohan Films
- Release date: 5 April 2024
- Running time: 122 minutes
- Country: India
- Language: Kannada

Avatara Purusha 2 is a 2024 Indian Kannada-language supernatural comedy thriller film written and directed by Suni and produced by Pushkara Mallikarjunaiah under his banner Pushkar Films. It stars Sharan and Ashika Ranganath in the lead roles. P. Sai Kumar, Bhavya, Balaji Manohar, and Srinagar Kitty feature in supporting roles. Abhinandan Kashyap composed the music while William David served as the cinematographer.

This film is the follow-up to Avatara Purusha Part 1: Astadigbandanamadalakam, serving as both a sequel and a prequel. The film was released after a long wait on 5 April 2024.

== Plot ==
The story continues from Part 1, later revealing details of Anil's past connection with Bistha and how he decides to change his life. Full details are not revealed but the movie ends with a twist to set the story for part 3. Whether Anil is real Karna or who he really is, will the real Karna come back?

== Cast ==
- Sharan as Anil/Gampa/Karna
- Ashika Ranganath as Siri, Yashodha's daughter
- P. Sai Kumar as Rama Jois
- Bhavya as Susheela, Rama Jois's wife
- Balaji Manohar as Hinnudi, Darka's aide
- Sudha Rani as Yashodha, Rama Jois's sister
- Ashutosh Rana as Darka
- Srinagar Kitty as Kumara
- Ayyappa P. Sharma as Brahma Jois, Rama Jois's father
- Vijay Chendoor as Bhoja
- B. Suresha as Kanti Jois
- Sadhu Kokila as Rampa
- Manthana as Janaki, Bhoja's wife
- Patre Nagaraj as Ramshetty

== Production ==
=== Development ===
Director Suni stated that he was "intrigued by the subject of black magic". He said he "took inspiration from a bunch of novels" including Tulasi Dalam. He used black magic as the theme and wrote a story to be adapted into a web series, but eventually decided against it as he was unsure as to how "OTT would work with Kannada audiences". The film was titled after a 1988 film of the same starring Ambareesh, "because the makers felt the title was apt for the story". Producer Pushkara Mallikarjunaiah added that the film takes a leaf from the Hindu epic Mahabharata. Suni stated that lead actor Sharan would play a "junior artiste" in the film and "will be one among the crowd. He has many roles to play, and will be seen in many get ups. The different shades of him also relates to his own life. The title Avatar Purusha blends with the story." He said that "[e]xtensive research has gone into the film. Avatar Purusha will see an element of Trishanku and the slogan Aswathama Hatha Kunjaraha..., which adds a valuable point in our film". Suni added that the film explored the practice of black magic in Karnataka. To study more about it, he travelled to Kerala, Kollegal and Rajasthan "where they practice black magic. We got to experience the vibrations and more." He stated that the Hindu mythological King Trishanku's desire to remain immortal and sage Vishwamitra's creation of a loka for him, before the former backed out after learning that he has to hang upside down there, served as the base for the film because, "when Trishnanku's world became empty, there were people who wanted to find that world." Special sets to depict the loka and an animated story that shows narrating Trishnanku's tale were created.

== Soundtrack ==
Avatara Purusha

Soundtrack album by Abhinandan Kashyap
- Released: 2024
- Recorded: 2023
- Studio: Pushkar Films
- Genre: Feature film soundtrack
- Length: 3:25
- Language: Kannada
- Producer: Abhinandan Kashyap

The music and background score of the film is composed by Abhinandan Kashyap who also composed the first installment of the series.

Track listing
No.	Title	Lyrics	Singer(s)	Length
1.	"Ivane Avatar Purusha"	MC Bijju	MC Bijju, Auraa, Abhinandan Kashyap	3:25
Total length:				3:25

== Reception ==
A Sharadhaa of The New Indian Express said that “Simple Suni’s sequel, Avatara Purusha 2 isn’t quite a comedy, horror, or even fantasy; it’s a journey that leaves viewers stranded in Trishanku status, unsure of where to turn.” Vivek M.K of The Hindu said that “The sequel to Avatara Purusha, while anticipated due to the intriguing ending of its predecessor, unfortunately, falls short of expectations.”

== Release ==
The film was set to be released on 22 March 2024 after a long wait due to delays in post production works, however, it was later released on 5 April 2024.
