= Katha Sangama (2019 film) =

Indian movie

- Poster
- Directed by: Kiranraj K. Chandrajith Belliappa; Shashi Kumar P. Rahul P. K. Jamadagni Manoj; Karan Ananth; Jayshankar A.
- Written by: Kiranraj K. Chandrajith Belliappa; Jayanth Seege S. Rahul P. K. Jamadagni Manoj; Karan Ananth; Jayshankar A.
- Produced by: H. K. Prakash; Pradeep N. R. Rishab Shetty
- Starring: Hariprriya; Rishab Shetty; Kishore; Yagna Shetty; Raj B. Shetty; Balaji Manohar; Pramod Shetty; Avinash; Hari Samasthi
- Cinematography: Venkatesh Anguraj; Arvind S. Kashyap; Gomtesh Upadhye; Sandeep P. S. Ranganath C. M. Deepak Yaragera; Saurav Prateek Sanyal
- Edited by: Bharath M. C. Rithwik Rao; Arya; Vinayak G. Chandan C. M. Abhishek
- Music by: Nobin Paul; Vasuki Vaibhav; Gagan Baderiya; Dossmode; Agnata; Girish Hothur; Vasu Dixit
- Production companies: Shree Devi Entertainers; Rishab Shetty Films
- Release date: 6 December 2019
- Running time: 156 minutes
- Country: India
- Language: Kannada

Katha Sangama (transl. Confluence of tales) is an Indian Kannada-language anthology film composed of seven short films directed by seven directors including Kiranraj K (of 777 Charlie fame), Chandrajith Belliappa, Shashi Kumar P, Rahul PK, Jamadagni Manoj, Karan Ananth, Jayashankar A. The team has seven cinematographers, musicians, and editors. This movie features Hariprriya, Rishab Shetty, Kishore, Raj B. Shetty, Yagna Shetty, Prakash Belawadi, Avinash, Balaji Manohar, Pramod Shetty, Hari Samasthi and others. This movie was conceptualised by Rishab Shetty as an ode to late Sri Puttanna Kanagal, director of the 1976 movie of the same name. This movie is jointly produced by H.K.Prakash, Pradeep N.R and Rishab Shetty films.

The story Paduvaarahalli (starring Avinash) was based on Hernando Téllez's short story Just lather, that's all. The third story Girgitle, directed by Shashi Kumar P starring Raj B. Shetty was inspired by Hollywood film Groundhog Day (1993).

== Plot ==
Katha Sangama is a family drama anthology, with one of its story that revolves around a father's attempt to build a fantasy land. Kishore, who lives in Bengaluru with his wife Yagna Shetty uses Hindi as a code language to discuss sensitive topics in front of their daughter. The film is a tribute to film director Puttanna Kanagal.

This ensemble film features another intriguing short story titled as Sagara Sangama written by the 777 Charlie director, Kiranraj K. This 20 minute plot revolves around a solo woman traveler getting stuck in the middle of nowhere, only to find herself stuck with a shady looking beggar with a fierce dog, to seek help from. The 'Spotlight Documentary Film Awards' winning director has smartly conveyed the message of 'Don't judge a book by its cover' to this short story with an unexpected twist, that unfolds with a heart touching end.

The next story Sathya Katha Prasanga is described to be a trippy one, which revolves around the mundane life of a man stuck in a time wrap and how he unfolds the journey of sadness, frustration and confusion.

Girgitle starring Raj B. Shetty and Amrutha Naik is an introspective story about a man leading a simple lifestyle, and how it takes an unexpected plot twist with an offbeat end, shot on the coast of Kaapu beach.

Uttara is an intense two-character story, that grabs the viewers undivided attention into delving for the conclusion of the conversation between two people who are dealing with sensitive media frenzy issues.

Paduvarahalli is a story that has been set in the era of British rule in India. It narrates the dichotomy of minds that occurs when a Sepoy visits a barber shop, amidst the occurrence of British-India riots.

This anthology ends with a drama genre tale, Lachhavva, that narrates a story of an innocent Hubli woman lost in the busy city of Bengaluru, and her journey of helplessness in finding her way back home. There is a fortunate instance of serendipity in the end to her tale.

== Cast ==
| Ranibowland by Chandrajith Belliappa (20 minutes) | Sathya Katha Prasanga by Karan Ananth (21 minutes) | Girgitle by Shashi Kumar P (23 minutes) |
|---|---|---|
| Kishore as a father; Yagna Shetty as a mother; Mridinika as Ria | Prakash Belawadi as Sathya Murthy; Sowmya Jaganmurthy as a tattoo artiste | Raj B. Shetty as Vini; Amrutha Naik as Vini's girlfriend |
| Sagara Sangama by Kiranraj K (16 minutes) | Utthara by Rahul PK (26 minutes) | Padavarahalli by Jamadagni Manoj (14 minutes) |
| Hariprriya as Radha; Rishab Shetty as a beggar; Dog as Rumy | Pramod Shetty as Jacob; Balaji Manohar as Paramesh Rangaswamy | |
Lacchavva by Jaishankar (25 minutes)
Paravva as Lachhavva; Beera as Beera

- Avinash
- Hari Samasthi
- Manasi Sudhir
- Suhan Shetty
- Heroor Dayanand Shetty
- Pratham Hosakoti
- Vasu Dixit
- Beeresh
- Raghavendra
- Nidhi Hegde

== Soundtrack ==
The movie consists of 7 music composers for 7 stories. This includes Nobin Paul, Vasuki Vaibhav, Gagan Baderiya, Dossmode, Agnata, Girish Hothur, Vasu Dixit.

| No. | Title | Lyrics | Music | Singer(s) | Length |
|---|---|---|---|---|---|
| 1. | "Manasina Olage" | Mayasandra Krishna Prasad | Agnata | Aditi Sagar |
| 2. | "Arivu Beku" (Translation by Ranjana Bhatt) | Kabir Das | Vasu Dixit | Vasu Dixit |
| 3. | "Life Untu" | Raj B. Shetty | Dossmode | Raj B. Shetty, Dossmode |
| 4. | "Mamavathu Sri Saraswathi" | Mysore Vasudevacharya | Nobin Paul | Sruthy Sasidharan, Midhun Dev |
| 5. | "Naa Ninnaya" | Chandrajith Belliappa | Gagan Baderiya | Madhuri Seshadri |
| 6. | "Oorendar Enu" | Jayalakshmi Patil | Vasuki Vaibhav | Sangeetha Katti |
| 7. | "Irula Chandiranu" | Chandrajith Belliappa | Gagan Baderiya | Siddartha Belmannu |
