= Window Seat (film) =

2022 Indian Kannada film

- Directed by: Sheetal Shetty
- Produced by: Jack Manju
- Starring: Nirup Bhandari; Sanjana Anand; Amrutha Iyengar
- Music by: Arjun Janya
- Release date: 1 July 2022
- Country: India
- Language: Kannada

Window Seat is a 2022 Indian Kannada-language mystery thriller directed by Sheetal Shetty which stars Nirup Bhandari, Sanjana Anand and Amrutha Iyengar in lead roles. The music is composed by Arjun Janya.

== Cast ==
- Nirup Bhandari as Raghu
- Sanjana Anand as Maya
- Amrutha Iyengar as Anjali
- P. Ravishankar
- Madhusudhan Rao
- Lekha Naidu

== Soundtrack ==
The soundtrack album has three singles composed by Arjun Janya, and released on Anand Audio.

Window Seat (Original Motion Picture Soundtrack)
No.	Title	Singer(s)	Length
1.	"Khaali Akaasha"	Vijay Prakash	3:56
2.	"Ati Chendada"	Vijay Prakash	5:01
3.	"Jazz"	Soundarya Jaychandran	3:40

== Release ==
The film was released on 1 July 2022. The digital distribution rights of the film were acquired by ZEE5. The film started streaming digitally on ZEE5 from 21 October 2022.
