= Vikrant Rona =

2022 Indian film by Anup Bhandari

- Theatrical release poster
- Directed by: Anup Bhandari
- Written by: Anup Bhandari
- Produced by: Shalini Manjunath; Jack Manjunath; Alankar Pandian
- Starring: Sudeepa; Milana Nagaraj; Nirup Bhandari; Neetha Ashok; Jacqueline Fernandez
- Cinematography: William David
- Edited by: Ashik Kusugolli
- Music by: B. Ajaneesh Loknath
- Production companies: Shalini Arts; Invenio Origin
- Distributed by: Kichcha Creations (Karnataka); Zee Studios (Tamil Nadu); Salman Khan Films; PVR Pictures (North India); Cosmos Entertainment; KFC Distributors (Telangana & Andhra Pradesh); Wayfarer Films (Kerala); One Twenty 8 Media; Phars Film (Overseas)
- Release date: 28 July 2022
- Running time: 147 minutes
- Country: India
- Language: Kannada
- Budget: ₹95 crore
- Box office: est. ₹158.50–210 crore (Note: Zee Business reported that the movie collected ₹158.50 crore But The Hindustan Times mentioned the collection as ₹159 crore. While Times Of India, India Today, DNA and ABP Marathi stated the collection to be ₹200 crore, Zee News, WION and Telegraph reported the collection to be ₹210 crore.)

Vikrant Rona, also known by the initialism VR, is a 2022 Indian Kannada-language action thriller film written and directed by Anup Bhandari, produced by Jack Manjunath and co-produced by Alankar Pandian. It stars Sudeepa in the title role with Milana Nagaraj, Nirup Bhandari, Neetha Ashok, and Jacqueline Fernandez. The story revolves around Inspector Vikrant Rona, who arrives at a remote village in the middle of a tropical rainforest where he starts witnessing a series of unexplainable events which are attributed to the supernatural.

Vikrant Rona was released theatrically in 3D on 28 July 2022, and digitally in ZEE5 on 2 September 2022. The film received mixed reviews from critics. In box office collections, it became the Six highest-grossing Kannada film of all time and the third highest-grossing Kannada movie of 2022.

== Plot ==
The film opens with children reading storybooks. One of them narrates a tale about a Brahmarakshasa in Kamarottu, a village in Karnataka, who kidnapped and killed children. The story transitions to a child being abducted by a mysterious figure.

The next day, we meet Janardhan Gambira, a short-tempered landlord living with his wife, Shaku, and brother, Eknath. His friend's son, Vishwanath, arrives with his family, including his daughter Panna, who is engaged and wants her wedding in their ancestral house. Janardhan refuses, saying the house is haunted after his son, Sanju, was accused of stealing temple jewels 28 years ago. That night, Sanju returns from London and, with Panna, finds the beheaded corpse of police officer Suresh Krishna in the house well.

Detective Vikrant Rona arrives in the village with his daughter, Guddi, to investigate. He survives an attack and finds eerie clues, including a ₹1 note, cryptic writing, and signs of past child murders. He discovers that 14 children, mostly students from the local school run by P.E. teacher Lawrence Pinto, were killed similarly. He interrogates local smuggler Moose Kunni, learning of his links to the crime. Meanwhile, Panna investigates on her own and finds an old woman, Deyyu, in the ancestral house, along with Suresh Krishna's severed head. She learns that Deyyu is the mother of Nittoni, a former temple caretaker framed for theft by Janardhan and Vishwanath. Nittoni and his family—wife, sons Madhava and Raghava, and a young daughter—committed suicide in shame, leaving Deyyu mentally unstable.

Vikrant discovers that the crime scene of a child's murder is on Moose Kunni's property. While interrogating him, he learns that the murdered children's fathers were Madhava and Raghava's classmates who had bullied and humiliated them for their lower caste and status. Panna hears a village elder say that the same cryptic writing found on the corpses was present at the site of Nittoni's family's death. The elder also recalls another note vowing revenge against those responsible.

Vikrant realizes that only four bodies were found at the time of Nittoni's family's death, meaning Madhava likely survived. When he questions Lawrence Pinto again, he notices a Shiva tattoo, raising suspicion. Pinto escapes, leading Vikrant to an abandoned temple where he finds the names and belongings of the murdered children.

A shocking revelation follows—Vikrant's daughter, Guddi, was actually one of the victims, and her presence throughout the film was a hallucination caused by his trauma. His wife remains in a coma from the same attack. Vikrant, a former classmate of Madhava and Raghava, had never actively bullied them but had also never defended them. He realizes that Madhava, now disguised as Lawrence Pinto, is exacting revenge.

Meanwhile, Panna and Munna, who realize they are the next targets, are kidnapped. Vikrant deduces that Madhava's younger brother, Raghava, is also alive. The truth is revealed—Sanju is actually Raghava, who killed the real Sanju as revenge for the temple theft that led to his family's downfall.

In the climax, Vikrant fights Madhava and Raghava. Madhava and Deyyu die, while Vikrant defeats and kills Raghava, avenging his daughter. Panna and Munna reunite with their family, while Vikrant, at Janardhan's request, keeps Raghava's fate a secret from Shaku.

== Cast ==
- Sudeepa as Vikrant "Vicky" Rona
- Nirup Bhandari as Sanjeev "Sanju" Gambhira / Raghava
- Neetha Ashok as Aparna Ballal aka Panna
- Jacqueline Fernandez as Racquel D'Coasta / Gadang Rakkamma / Sapna
- Ravishankar Gowda as Vishwanath Ballal
- Madhusudan Rao as Janardhan Gambhira
- V. Priya as Shantha "Shaku" Gambhira
- Vasuki Vaibhav as Baalakrishna "Baalu"
- Siddu Moolimani as Mohanchandra "Munna" Ballal
- Ramm Bogadi as Mahabala
- Chitkala Biradar as Baby Ballal
- Samhitha as Geethanjali "Guddi" Rona, Vikrant's daughter
- Ramesh Kukkuvalli as Eknath Gambhira
- Vajradheer Jain as Lawrence Pinto / Madhava
- Dushyanth Rai as Moose Kunni
- Karthik Rao Kordale as Fakruddin aka Pakru
- Ranjan Shetty as Rudramani Bhavikatte
- Vishwanatha KC as Manche Gowda
- Yogish Shetty as Nittoni, Madhava and Raghava's father
- Achinthya Puranik as Young Sanju
- Milana Nagaraj as Renu Rona, Vikrant's wife (cameo appearance)
- Anup Bhandari as Old Photographer (cameo appearance)

== Production ==
=== Development ===
Sudeepa and Anup Bhandari were to collaborate for a project titled Billa Ranga Baasha; however, the film was put on hold as Sudeepa heard another script from Anup Bandari. Sudeepa decided to produce the film with newcomers playing the lead roles but decided that he himself will star in the film after listening to the script. Vikrant Rona is produced by Manjunath Gowda's Shalini Arts. Alankar Pandian of Invenio Origin joined the film as a co-producer.

=== Filming ===
Primary photoshoot began on 1 March 2020, and filming started on 2 March at Hyderabad under the title Phantom. Actor Sudeepa began filming Kotigobba 3 and Phantom simultaneously. The producers originally planned to cast Sudeep's nephew Sanchith Sanjeev, but went with Nirup Bhandari instead. When the team preparing for second schedule COVID-19 pandemic hits badly and the works stopped. On 13 June, the crew announced they would resume shooting in July.

Then on 16 July 2020, they resumed their work amid pandemic at Annapurna Studios, Hyderabad, by constructing huge dense forest set. Most of the filming done in Annapurna Studios and Ramoji Film City Hyderabad. Other shoots were done in Malshej Ghat, Mahabaleshwar and Kerala. This was the first Kannada movie to use the advanced real-time 3D creation tool Unreal Engine.

=== Casting ===
Jacqueline Fernandez was roped in to play a prominent role along with a song appearance, while Anup Bhandari's brother Nirup Bhandari and other actors and actresses like Neetha Ashok, Ravishankar Gowda, Madhusudhan Rao and Vasuki Vaibhav appear in other pivotal roles.

== Music ==
Music director B. Ajaneesh Loknath composed the songs and background music for the movie and its his first collaboration with actor Sudeepa. The music rights of the film are owned by Lahari Music and T-Series.

== Release ==
=== Theatrical ===
The film was released worldwide on 28 July 2022 with 3D version in more than 3000 screens. Earlier the film was scheduled to release on 19 August 2021. However, it was postponed due to the COVID-19 pandemic to 24 February 2022, and later to 28 July 2022. In addition to the original Kannada, the film was dubbed and released in Tamil, Hindi, Telugu, Malayalam and English. The film released in 3000 screens including 450 in Karnataka. The film was released in 87 screens in Kolkata.

The film was initially planned to be made on a budget of ₹15 crore, however, the budget was increased to ₹45 crore due to the scale of the film with including promotional budget . The Telugu version was released in 370 screens in the first week and continued to be screened in 320 theatres in the second week.

=== Distribution ===
The Hindi version of the film is distributed by Salman Khan Films and PVR Pictures all over North India. The Middle East region rights have been bought by One Twenty 8 Media. The Kerala distribution rights of the film are acquired by Dulquer Salmaan's Wayfarer Films. The Tamil Nadu distribution rights of the film was acquired by Zee Studios while the Andhra Pradesh and Telangana distribution rights were acquired by Cosmos Entertainment.

=== Home media ===
The satellite and digital rights of the Kannada version have been purchased by Zee Kannada and ZEE5, respectively. It was officially announced by Zee Kannada head Raghavendra Hunsur in his channel's show, Zee Kutumba Awards in 2021. The film digitally streamed on ZEE5 on 2 September 2022. The Hindi, Tamil and Telugu versions were digitally streamed on Disney+ Hotstar from 16 September 2022.

== Reception ==
=== Critical reception ===
On the review aggregator website Rotten Tomatoes, 40% of 5 critics' reviews are positive, with an average rating of 4/10.

Renuka Vyavahare of The Times of India gave the film 3 out of 5 and wrote "Vikrant Rona could evolve into a decent mystery series ahead packed with more dark adventures if the makers get rid of the unnecessary fluff. With so much potential, we wish this mysterious fantasy had risen to the occasion sooner." Shrishti Negi of News18 gave the film's rating 3 out of 5 and wrote "Overall, Vikrant Rona is a treat for hardcore Kiccha Sudeep fans who have been waiting for this film with bated breath. The film releases in theatres today."

Shubhra Gupta of The Indian Express rated the film 1.5 out of 5 stars and wrote "The convoluted plot and stilted dialogues of this Kiccha Sudeep-starrer mar the experience". A critic for Bollywood Hungama rated the film 1.5 out of 5 stars and wrote "VIKRANT RONA fails to impress due to the poor script, direction and length". Bharathi Pradhan of Lehren rated the film 1.5 out of 5 stars and wrote "Vikrant will even sing you a lullaby. Whether in Kannada or Hindi, you'll go zzzzz". Saibal Chatterjee of NDTV rated the film 2 out of 5 stars and wrote "Vikrant Rona isn't interested in specificities. It seeks to overwhelm with the scale of its ambition. It falls well short of greatness but never stops trying". Nandini Ramnath of Scroll.in rated the film 2 out of 5 stars and wrote "Focused on creating a visually evocative setting and showcasing leading man Sudeep's cool moves, Vikrant Rona is happy to miss the wood for the trees". Deepa Gahlot of Rediff rated the film 2 out of 5 stars and wrote "The plot keeps getting weirder by the minute, and scenes leapfrog round with no control. The result is bafflement and boredom". Rohit Bhatnagar of The Free Press Journal rated the film 2 out of 5 stars and wrote "The film has an interesting premise, but it's weaker on the screenplay front and does not hold your attention for long". Sowmya Rajendran of The News Minute rated the film 2.5 out of 5 stars and wrote "Vikrant Rona has been marketed as an "action adventure fantasy" film — but strangely, it doesn't fall into any of the three genres". A critic for The Hans India rated the film 2 out of 5 stars and wrote "Except for the lavish sets and proceedings, the film fell low on emotions. In trying to emulate his predecessors, Anup Bhandari failed to recreate the emotions which impacted him badly".

Soundarya Athimuthu of The Quint rated the film 2.5 out of 5 stars and wrote "Vikrant Rona tries to be smart with its detailing in the plot".

=== Box office ===
The film grossed ₹35 crores on the first day including ₹16 crores to ₹17.80 crores from Karnataka alone. The first day domestic net collections were reported to be around ₹19.6 crores. The Hindi version collected ₹1 crore nett on the first day which was reported to be higher than the Hindi dubbed versions of Vikram, 777 Charlie, Beast and Valimai. The Telugu version grossed ₹2 crores on the opening day. On the second day, the Hindi version collected ₹75 lakhs in northern belt which was reported to be more than the second day collection of Vikram in North India. The film was reported to have collected ₹55–₹60 crores in two days from all its versions. The three-day worldwide collection was estimated to be around ₹80– ₹85 crores. The film was reported to have collected ₹20 to ₹25 crores on second day and ₹23 to ₹25 crores on third day. The film collected ₹25 crores to ₹29 crores on the fourth day.The Indian Express reported the four-day weekend collection to be ₹100 crores and The Telegraph reported it to be ₹96 crores while The Times of India estimated it to be around ₹ 105 crores. According to News 18, the film grossed ₹110 crores in four days whereas Hindustan Times estimated it to be around ₹115–₹120 crores. The Hindi version was reported to have collected ₹5.96 crores in first four days. By the end of fifth day, the worldwide gross was estimated to be around ₹110 crores to ₹134 crores. The Telugu Version was reported to have grossed ₹10 crores in six days. The film was reported to have grossed ₹5.5–6 crore on the seventh day. Though few sources reported that the film grossed ₹158.5 crores in seven days, other sources reported that the film crossed the ₹150 crore mark in 8 days. The film grossed ₹3 crore on day 10 and ₹3.5 crore on day 11. The total 11 day collection of the Hindi version was reported to be around ₹9.7 crores. However, The Indian Express reported that the 11 day worldwide gross of the film from all five versions to be ₹86 crore based on a report by consultancy firm Ormax Media which had considered collections until July end but published in mid-August. The film collected ₹1 crore each on Day 12 and Day 13. The film was reported to have grossed ₹200 crores at the end of two weeks thereby becoming the third Kannada film to reach that milestone after K.G.F: Chapter 1 and K.G.F: Chapter 2. At the end of 16 days, it was reported that the film collected ₹14 crores nett from the Hindi version and ₹7.5 crores nett from the Telugu version. Zee News and WION reported that the film had grossed ₹210 crores at the end of 27 days.

== Sequel ==
In an interview with News 18, Sudeepa had asserted a possibility of a sequel to Vikrant Rona.

== Awards ==
- Chittara Star Awards 2023:-
  - Best Actor – Male – Sudeep – Pending
  - Best Debutant Actor – Female – Neetha Ashok – Pending
  - Best Movie – Pending
  - Best Director – Anup Bhandari – Pending
  - Best Playback Singer – Female – Sunidhi Chauhan for the song "Ra Ra Rakkamma" – Pending
  - Best Actor in a Negative Role' – Nirup Bhandari – Pending
  - Best Cinematographer – William David – Pending
  - Best Dance Choreographer – Jani Master for the song Ra Ra Rakkamma – Pending
  - Best Lyric Writer – Anup Bhandari for the song Ra Ra Rakkamma – Pending
  - Best Editor – Ashik Kusugolli – Pending
  - Best Child Artist – Samhitha – Pending
  - Best Stunt Director – A. Vijay – Pending
  - Best Dialogue Writer – Anup Bhandari – Pending

- ViKa (Vijaya Karnataka) Web Cinema Awards 2022:-
  - Best Movie – Pending
  - Best Actor – Sudeep – Pending
  - Best Director – Anup Bhandari – Pending
  - Best Cinematographer – William David – Pending
  - Best Music – B. Ajaneesh Loknath – Pending
  - Best Actor in a Negative Role – Nirup Bhandari – Pending
