= Avatara Purusha (2022 film) =

2022 Indian film by Suni

- Directed by: Suni
- Written by: Suni; Sheelam M Swamy; Kiran; Arjun
- Produced by: Pushkara Mallikarjunaiah
- Starring: Sharan; Ashika Ranganath
- Cinematography: William David
- Edited by: Manu Shedgar
- Music by: Arjun Janya
- Production company: Pushkar Films
- Distributed by: Pushkar Films; Mohan Films
- Release date: 6 May 2022
- Running time: 129 minutes
- Country: India
- Language: Kannada

Avatara Purusha (or Avatara Purusha: Part 1) is a 2022 Indian Kannada-language supernatural comedy thriller film written and directed by Suni. The film is produced by Pushkara Mallikarjunaiah under his studio Pushkar Films. It stars Sharan and Ashika Ranganath in the lead roles. P. Sai Kumar, Bhavya, Balaji Manohar and Srinagar Kitty feature in supporting roles. Arjun Janya composed the music while William David served as the cinematographer. The film was theatrically released on 6 May 2022.

The film was conceived as the first of a two-instalment series. with the sequel being titled as Avatara Purusha 2.

== Plot ==
Rama Jois is an Ayurveda expert, where he and his wife Susheela, lose their only son Karna, when he goes missing while on a trip to a temple festival with his aunt Yashoda. The guilt of having lost her nephew has been eating away at Yashoda, so when she finally opens up to her daughter Siri about the circumstances that brought about a split between her and her brother, the latter decides that she will mend the brother-sister relationship by bringing Karna back. Her plan is to get someone to pretend to not only be Karna, but also convincingly accept Ram Jois and Susheela. Anila is a cinema junior artist who gets rejected to act in films due to his OTT acting skills. Siri finds Anila is suitable for the task and makes a deal with Anila to pretend as Karna and needs to make them convinced that their son is back, but Rama Jois isn't convinced and suspects Anila. Anila also finds about the Jois family's long battle to protect the powerful Trishanku stone from getting into the hands of Dharka and Hinnudi. Kumara's entry into the Jois family and their connection with Trishanku bead and the black magic world forms the curious plot of the film.

== Cast ==
- Sharan as Anila (Karna)
- Ashika Ranganath as Siri, Yashodha's daughter
- P. Sai Kumar as Rama Jois
- Bhavya as Susheela, Rama Jois's wife
- Balaji Manohar as Hinnudi, Darka's aide
- Sudha Rani as Yashodha, Rama Jois's sister
- Ashutosh Rana as Darka
- Srinagar Kitty as Kumara
- Ayyappa P. Sharma as Brahma Jois, Rama Jois's father
- Vijay Chendoor as Bhoja
- B Suresh as Kanti Jois
- Sadhu Kokila as Gampa
- Manthana as Janaki, Bhoja's wife
- Patre Nagaraj as Ramshetty

== Production ==
=== Development ===
Director Suni stated that he was "intrigued by the subject of black magic". He said he "took inspiration from a bunch of novels" including Tulasi Dalam. He used black magic as the theme and wrote a story to be adapted into a web series, but eventually decided against it as he was unsure as to how "OTT would work with Kannada audiences". The film was titled after a 1988 film of the same starring Ambareesh, "because the makers felt the title was apt for the story". Producer Pushkara Mallikarjunaiah added that the film takes a leaf from the Hindu epic Mahabharata. Suni stated that lead actor Sharan would play a "junior artiste" in the film and "will be one among the crowd. He has many roles to play, and will be seen in many get ups. The different shades of him also relates to his own life. The title Avatar Purusha blends with the story." He said that "[e]xtensive research has gone into the film. Avatar Purusha will see an element of Trishanku and the slogan Aswathama Hatha Kunjaraha..., which adds a valuable point in our film". Suni added that the film explored the practice of black magic in Karnataka. To study more about it, he travelled to Kerala, Kollegal and Rajasthan "where they practice black magic. We got to experience the vibrations and more." He stated that the Hindu mythological King Trishanku's desire to remain immortal and sage Vishwamitra's creation of a loka for him, before the former backed out after learning that he has to hang upside down there, served as the base for the film because, "when Trishnanku's world became empty, there were people who wanted to find that world." Special sets to depict the loka and an animated story that shows narrating Trishnanku's tale were created.

=== Casting ===
Sharan and Ashika Ranganath, who worked together previously in Raambo 2 (2018), were cast as the leading pair. Ashika stated that she would play "a bold girl" in the film, a non-resident Indian named Siri. Srinagar Kitty was cast to play a practitioner of black magic from Odisha named Kumara, one of the avatars of Sharan's character. It was reported that Charan Raj would score music for the film, while William David would serve as the cinematographer. Suni further added that filming was to begin on 11 February 2019, and that a major part would be shot in Chikmagalur, Karnataka. That Ashutosh Rana would be a part of the film, his return to acting in Kannada films after 13 years, was revealed in January 2021. Suni added that Rana that he would be a part of the second instalment of the two-part series. The supporting cast on the film included Balaji Manohar (to play a character named Hinnudi), P. Sai Kumar, Sudha Rani, Bhavya and Sadhu Kokila.

=== Filming ===
Filming began on 17 February 2019. In November that year, it was reported that Arjun Janya was signed in to score for the film. It was Suni's first collaboration with Janya. He stated that since he was making a "humourous [sic] film that also deals with black magic", it gave the makers "a lot of scope to work with the music theme, as well as the background scores and re-recording." He added, "Each character has a different music theme and we are experimenting with different genres for the same. There's everything from jazz to death metal." The News Minute reported in April 2020 that a major portion of filming was completed "with just a song and fight sequences to be canned". Lockdown due to the COVID-19 pandemic meant filming was stalled for a while. It was resumed in September 2020. It completed on 21 September.

== Release and marketing ==
The first teaser of the film was released in February 2020. To mark Sharan's 49th birthday, another teaser was released on 6 February 2021 and it was announced that film would be released theatrically on 28 May. After remaining portions of filming was completed in September 2021 following the lockdown, the makers announced that the film would be released on 10 December that year but was postponed. The film was theatrically released on 6 May 2022.

== Soundtrack ==
Avatara Purusha

Soundtrack album by Arjun Janya
- Released: 6 May 2022
- Recorded: 2021
- Studio: Pushkar Films
- Genre: Feature film soundtrack
- Length: 19:16
- Language: Kannada
- Producer: Arjun Janya

Arjun Janya chronology
Ek Love Ya (2022)	Avatara Purusha (2022)	Gaalipata 2 (2023)

The music of film was composed by Arjun Janya while lyrics written by Kumaar and Priya Saraiya.

Track listing
No.	Title	Lyrics	Singer(s)	Length
1.	"Title Song"	Kiran Kotta, Arjun AR	Vyas Raj	4:03
2.	"Laddoo song"	Suni	Nihal Tauro	3:31
3.	"Hero Honda"	Shivu Bhergi	Vijay Prakash, Shamitha Malnad	4:13
4.	"Vasudaiva Kutumbakam"	Suni	Keertan Holla	5:07
5.	"Mantra Song"	Akash	Aniruddha Shastry	2:22
Total length:				19:16
