= Avane Srimannarayana =

2019 film directed by Sachin B Ravi

- Directed by: Sachin B. Ravi
- Written by: Rakshit Shetty; Chandrajith Belliappa; Anirudh Kodgi; Abhijith Mahesh; Nagarjuna Sharma; Abhilash
- Produced by: Pushkara Mallikarjunaiah; H. K. Prakash; Rakshit Shetty
- Starring: Rakshit Shetty; Shanvi Srivastava
- Cinematography: Karm Chawla
- Edited by: Sachin B. Ravi
- Music by: B. Ajaneesh Loknath; Charan Raj
- Production companies: Pushkar Films; Shree Devi Entertainers; Paramvah Studios
- Distributed by: Pushkar Films (Karnataka); Sandalwood Talkies (Worldwide); Sri Venkateswara Creations (Telangana & AP); Screen Scene Media Entertainment (Tamil Nadu); Mulakuppadam Films (Kerala)
- Release date: 27 December 2019
- Running time: 184 minutes
- Country: India
- Language: Kannada
- Budget: ₹20–24 crore
- Box office: est. ₹56 crore

Avane Srimannarayana (stylized as ASN) is a 2019 Indian Kannada-language western fantasy adventure comedy film (Note: The genre of the film is as disclosed by the film's team in its press release.) directed and edited by Sachin B. Ravi in his directorial debut. Jointly produced by Pushkara Mallikarjunaiah and H.K.Prakash, the film features Rakshit Shetty and Shanvi Srivastava in lead roles. B. Ajaneesh Loknath and Charan Raj composed the soundtrack, with the former composing the score, whereas Karm Chawla handled the cinematography. Described by Shetty as "Southern Odd Fiction", the film follows a corrupt police officer who takes on a bandit chief in order to recover a missing treasure in the 1980s.

The film's script was written by Rakshit Shetty, Chandrajith Belliappa, Anirudh Kodgi, Abhijith Mahesh, Nagarjuna Sharma, and Abhilash. Originally announced in February 2017, the scriptwriting took 18 months to complete, with filming eventually began in March 2018 and ended in June 2019. It was filmed in portions across North Karnataka region, and a huge set was erected at Bengaluru, where 90% of the film's shoot took place. The film was shot for 200 days, thus becoming the longest Kannada film to be shot, and also the only Kannada film with the highest number of call sheets. The film was compiled with 2000 VFX shots.

Produced on a budget of ₹200–240 million, Avane Srimannarayana was released in Kannada on 27 December 2019 and grossed ₹560 million worldwide. It was simultaneously dubbed and released into different languages such as Tamil, Telugu, Malayalam and Hindi. The Telugu version released on 1 January 2020. Tamil, Malayalam and Hindi versions released on Amazon Prime Video on 3 January 2020.

== Plot ==
During the 1980s in the western lawless city of Amaravati, Karnataka, the ruthless bandit king Ramarama of the Abhira kingdom kills a theater troupe for stealing a government treasure before he can. He spares and abducts the troupe bandmaster for his entertainment, but finds that they have already hidden the treasure. He searches to no avail, and on his deathbed he passes the throne to his younger son Tukaram. This leads his older son Jayaram to jealously and he kills his father and wounds Tukaram before taking the throne for himself, but he promised his father in his last moments not to kill Tukaram. Jayaram declares himself king but that he won't sit on the throne till they find their rightful treasure, but they fail to even fifteen years later.

The journalist Lakshmi and her cameraman Sudhakar are seen reporting on Harishchandra, a treasure hunter hired by Tukaram to find the missing treasure, but he's kidnapped during the report. Lakshmi reports this to the negligent inspector Narayana, and that the possible abductors were Jayaram's men. Narayana had mistakenly arrested four of Harishchandra's guards who were appointed by Tukaram who is now a politician bent on killing his brother. He lets them go but Tukaram catches and wishes to punish him. He forces Narayana to write a bounty on his own head, and he must find Harishchandra or be killed by mercenaries.

Narayana, however, takes advantage of this, and secretly writes the bounty to instead be to steal the newspaper delivery van to prevent Lakshmi from reporting his mistake but he ends up finding the kidnapped Harishchandra in the van and decides to fake a story where he rescued him for publicity. Jayaram reads about this and captures Narayana where he confesses the truth, but Jayaram lets Narayana live on the condition he'll find the treasure. It's revealed that Narayana used mercenaries to kidnap Harishchandra since he himself coveted the treasure. He also finds out from men of the earlier theater troupe that they're a religious group who believe in the prophecy of savior called Sri Hari. Since Jayaram seeks to persecute the troupe, Hari is supposed to protect them and a prophecy says an eagle will sit on the chosen one's hand. Narayana and his deputy Achyuthanna find that Harishchandra is kidnapped again by the troupe who believe he's Hari. The two disguise themselves and infiltrate the troupe festival, but an eagle sits on Narayana's arm as they're caught, causing the troupe to declare him Sri Hari.

Lakshmi confronts Narayana and warns him that posing as Sri Hari is dangerous, and that a faction of the troupe don't believe the prophecy. She tricks Narayana into a trap and kidnaps him, revealing that she and Sudhakar are members of said faction. The eagle from the previous night was supposed to choose Sudhakar but Narayana knocks him out to take his disguise, causing him to become Sri Hari instead. Lakshmi keeps him for punishment but Narayana escapes when they leave and consults a few of the believers in the troupe, who tell him the map for the treasure exists but nowhere to be found. For this, Narayana goes back to the Abhira fort and skillfully frames a guard Narsi for pocketing Tukaram's ring, which Narayana actually stole from him earlier. He also bribes two guards to frame Narsi as a thief, so Jayaram imprisons him. This was meant to snap the bandmaster out of his trauma and have him stand up for Narsi but it fails. The bribed guards help Narayana escape the fort, and the latter summons Tukaram eventually leading to a standoff between the brothers. As Narayana escapes, Tukaram outguns Jayaram and seizes the fort. The bandmaster manages to escape, but Narayana confronts him and finds out the troupe's traditional play reveals the treasure location.

Narayana goes back to Lakshmi and convinces her to help him find the treasure and save the troupe. He finds that the play tells the story of how the ocean was churned to create magical entities and one is symbolic of the treasure location. Despite Lakshmi cancelling further rehearsals, Narayana decodes the play and identifies the location as a secluded mountain forest. Some of Tukaram's men meet with Narayana to search for the treasure, while others manage to abduct the entire troupe and pour gasoline on the fort to destroy it. Jayaram manages to escape custody and kills Tukaram's men, eventually tying his brother to a cross. Narayana also finds a decoy chest with rocks, so Tukaram's men bury him alive, but Achyuthaana and other police manage to save him. Narayana deduces the real chest's location and takes it. He takes it to Jayaram and sets up snipers around the fort. He heads to the throne room and shows the treasure, stating that he'll exchange it for the troupe's lives. Narayana also shows that his men have started to burn the fort, causing Jayaram's men to renounce their loyalties and flee. Realizing he has lost everything, Jayaram fights Narayana in rage but is overpowered. Narayana evacuates the troupe and Jayaram is killed in the fire. Narayana is praised as a hero for his actions and eventually falls for Lakshmi, leading to their marriage. During the credits, Harishchandra meets Narayana's long lost father.

== Cast ==
- Rakshit Shetty in a dual role as Inspector Narayana and Vasudev (Narayana's Father), the former is the corrupt, selfish, and negligent inspector of Amaravati. He is skilled in combat and deception, is humorous, and goes through redemption.
- Shanvi Srivastava as Lakshmi, the reporter who follows the conflict between Jayaram and Tukaram, and eventually becomes Narayana's lover.
- Achyuth Kumar as Constable Achyuthanna, Narayana's close friend and right hand.
- Balaji Manohar as Jayarama, the ruthless Abhira king and main antagonist.
- Pramod Shetty as Tukaram, Jayaram's brother who is usurped and wishes to kill him.
- Madhusudhan Rao as Ramarama, Jayaram and Tukaram's father.
- Gopalkrishna Deshpande as Bandmaster, who was abducted by Ramarama and scarred by witnessing his friend's execution.
- Anirudh Mahesh as Shanku
- Salman Ahmed as Drama Company Artist
- Chandan Achar as Drama Company Artist
- Raghu Pandeshwar as Drama Artist
- Prakash Thuminad as Drama Company Artist
- Prakash Shenoy as Drama Company Artist
- Kiran Naik as Drama Company Artist
- Sree Harsha as Drama Company Artist
- Shashank MC as Drama Company Artist
- M. K. Mata as Gadipaar, Tukaram's henchman
- Vijay Chendoor as Sudhakara, Lakshmi's cameraman
- Gautham Raj as Vibhasu, one of Ramarama's men
- Ashwin Hassan as Narsi, one of Jayaram's men, who is framed by Narayana.
- Raghu Ramanakoppa as Harishchandra, a treasure hunter who is kidnapped by Narayana and then the theater troupe
- Rakesh Raaj, Shrikanth Nagaraj, Vishwanath, and Rupesh as Cowboys
- Abhijith Mahesh as Cobar
- Rishab Shetty as Cowboy Krishna in a cameo appearance
- Yograj Bhat as Guptananda swamiji in a cameo appearance

== Production ==
=== Development ===
During February 2017, Rakshit Shetty who was busy promoting the film Kirik Party (2016), in United States, announced that he will sign his next film, a romanctic comedy genre, with editor Sachin Ravi's directorial debut, who worked with Rakshit in Ulidavaru Kandanthe and Kirik Party. The conceptual poster of the film was released on 24 December 2017, with the film being titled as Avane Srimannarayana, which also stars Shanvi Srivastava in the female lead. It was touted to be an action comedy film, whose pre production work was expected to take place in March 2017, and the shoot will kickstart in April 2017. However, the team took 18 months to write the screenplay, as reported from a source. The film was set in the 1980s in a fictional village Amaravathi, and it was revealed that Rakshit Shetty would play a police officer.

In January 2018, Rakshit Shetty, Sachin and cinematographer Karm Chawla, writers Chandrajit Belliappa and Anirudh Kodgi, went on a recce across Hubli, Gulbarga, Vijayapura, Davanagere and Dharwad, to finalize the locations for a vintage setting based for the script. He stated that "The story is set in a fictional town and needs a rustic terrain that is also dry. So we headed to the picturesque locales of North Karnataka to finalize the story." The team eventually finalized Basavakalyan, after Rakshit Shetty stated, "In Basavakalyana we found the perfect setting for the film. With its ruins and majestic forts, it provided just the right ambience for the script." It was reported to be the only Kannada film with the highest number of shooting call-sheets. The film was shot for 200 days with 335 call sheets where one call sheet is one man-day. The film was compiled with 2000 VFX shots.

=== Filming ===
The film was launched on 14 March 2018, followed by a puja ceremony at the Dharmagiri Manjunatha Temple in Bengaluru. Rakshit Shetty and Shanvi Srivastava were present at the event. It was followed by a look test, the same week and have and the cast members doing script reading exercises. The team headed to Basavakalyan in North Karnataka regions, with shooting kickstarted on 20 March 2018, where the first schedule was held for 15 days. It was followed by a 10-day schedule in Bengaluru, where the makers filmed few scenes at a huge set erected in Kanteerava Studios. Rakshit stated "The film is set in a fictitious town and it will be shot in specially erected sets that will comprise 60% of the film. Since each of the sets requires 25 days to be put up, we will shoot the portions that will require the arid locales in North Karnataka between the time the sets get ready." On 9 May 2018, the makers wrapped the schedule in Bengaluru, and headed to Vijayapura on 15 May to shoot major sequences in the arid landscapes. On 25 May, the lead actress Shanvi joined the team to shoot her portions for the film. During filming, Rakshit simultaneously joined the launch of his new film 777 Charlie, directed by Kiranraj.

Avane Srimannarayana was touted to be the longest Kannada film, where the film was shot for 200 days. According to producer Pushkara Mallikarjuna, he stated "The makers had completed 160 days of shooting, with 40 days pending for its completion. Usually, the movie songs will be given more importance for shooting. But we decided to shoot the whole picture as exclusive. Each shot is unique, which contains more details. The movie will be released in different languages, so we shot in a way it should reach all kind of audience." He further added "Eight film sets had been developed for the movie, and 90% of the movie will be shot in the film set itself."

Pushkara Mallikarjuna, also stated that 14 large sets were erected for the film, which included an old-time retro pub, a forest on the set, a village colony, the outer and inner sets of the castle. On 5 February 2019, the makers recreated a huge forest at the Kanteerava Studio for a major portion of the film. One schedule required the team to shoot in the wild, but they didn't want to disturb wildlife and nature, they created a set resembling a huge forest. The film's shooting was wrapped up on 4 June 2019.

== Soundtrack ==
Originally, Charan Raj was announced in the film's team, composing music for the film, with his name being credited in the first poster. Later B. Ajaneesh Loknath, was also hired to provide the score and songs. Ajaneesh, who produced the background music for the film, worked with an orchestra from Macedonia, Greece. This marked the first time that background music for a Kannada film was recorded in Europe. The film has four songs in the Kannada version, two songs in both Telugu and Tamil version and one song in Malayalam and Hindi version.

The film's lead single "Hands Up" was released in all five versions on 13 December 2019, the same day as the rest of the soundtrack. The soundtrack featured lyrics written by Nagarjuna Sharma for the original version, Vivek for the Tamil version, Ramajogayya Sastry for the Telugu version, Sudamsu for the Malayalam version and Raqueeb Alam for the Hindi version. The same day, the makers unveiled the soundtrack album in all five languages.

== Release ==
Avane Srimannarayana was initially planned to have a release on 28 December 2018, to follow the success of the actor's earlier flick Kirik Party, initially had a release on the last week of December. However, the delay in the shoot prompted the makers to postpone its release. Followed by the success of KGF franchise, the makers prompoted Avane Srimannarayana, to release as a pan-Indian film in Kannada, Tamil, Telugu, Malayalam and Hindi languages. In April 2019, the makers announced that the film will be released in August 2019. However, the delays in post-production prompted the team to postpone the release to November. Later, Rakshit Shetty announced that the film will be scheduled to release on 27 December 2019.

Avane Srimannarayana was cleared by the Censor Board on 14 December 2019. While the Kannada and Tamil dubbed version were titled under the same name, the Malayalam version was titled Avan Srimannarayana, Telugu version was titled Athade Srimannarayana and Hindi version was titled Adventures of Srimannarayana. Initially, the makers wanted to release the film simultaneously in all languages on 27 December 2019. But the makers prompoted to release the Kannada version released on the said date, and then release the other dubbed versions after the word-of-mouth received for the film.

The Telugu dubbed version was distributed by film producer Dil Raju and released on 1 January 2020, coinciding with the New Year's Day. The Tamil and Malayalam versions were released on 3 January 2020. The former was distributed by Screen Scene Media Entertainment, while Tomichan Mulakuppadam of Mulakuppadam Films acquired the rights for the latter. The Hindi version was scheduled for a release on 17 January 2020, although it was not released due to less availability of screens. The Hindi version which was directly premiered through Amazon Prime Video on 7 February 2020.

=== Marketing ===
The makers planned a huge promotional campaign, at the biannual flower show in Lalbagh, where the team came up with a special installation structure put together is of a hand holding out a gun, with the poster of the film, featuring Rakshit Shetty, hanging out from the gun. Rakshit stated that "The installation is made with waste material that was collected from in and around Lalbagh itself. It was one of our team members who suggested this, and we came up with the idea spearheaded by our art director Ullas Hydoor. We have associated with an NGO for this initiative. The installation features a hand holding a pistol with 'Hand's up' written on it and an image of my look as Narayana along with it." The filmmakers kickstarted its promotions on 8 October 2019, at the dasara festival in Mysore.

The film's official trailer was launched at an event held at Swagath Shankarnag Chitramandira, MG Road on 28 November 2019. Dhanush, Nani and Nivin Pauly presented the trailers of the film in Tamil, Telugu and Malayalam versions. Ahead of the film's release, the makers came up with a quirky promotional activity, asking fans to decode the numbers featured in the trailer, to form a code to crack it; the team also announced to provide ₹2 lakh (US$2,100) for the lucky winner in the contest.

The makers advertised the film in buses and autorickshaws, as of 130 cut outs, 500 hoardings have been put across Bangalore, including posters on 500 buses and 3000 autos. Apart from this, the promotional crew, also branded the film's posters on suburb trains, thus becoming the first ever Kannada film to be promoted in a train. The makers also set photo booths in various malls across the city. Rakshit Shetty and team, kickstarted the promotional tour of the film in major metro cities, Chennai, Hyderabad and Kochi.

=== Home media ===
The digital rights of the film were sold to Amazon Prime Video, and was made available to stream on 7 February 2020 with runtime of 186 minutes. The satellite rights of the film were sold to Star Suvarna and was premiered on 15 March 2020. The film premiered in Hindi on Colors Cineplex on 26 September 2021.

== Reception ==
Writing for the News18, Sharth Sharma Kalagaru gave 4 out of 5 stars, stating "Srimannarayana (Rakshit Shetty) is witty and charming. Keeping the local milieu authentic with his dialogue delivery and mannerism, Shetty shoulders the film in the best way possible. The background score and visual effects are a big plus for Avane Srimannarayana." Sunayana Suresh of The Times of India gave 3.5 out of 5 stars stating "Avane Srimannarayana scores with its performances, the cinematography, sets and background score elevate the tale. Srimannarayana is a treat for fans of not just Rakshit Shetty, but those who like cinema to be a wholesome, intelligent exercise." Aravind Shwetha of The News Minute gave 4 out of 5 stars stating "Avane Srimannarayana fantasy thriller is a visual treat and scores high on performances. Rakshit Shetty as the smart, witty, bad cop is good to watch, and we get to a see a different version of the actor in Shanvi Srivastava. Debut director Sachin Ravi has fulfilled the promise of delivering a sure-fire hit, and Ajneesh Loknath’s background music is the film’s biggest plus." The Indian Express editor-in-chief Manoj Kumar R, gave 3.5 out of 5 stars stating "In spite of its flaws, Avane Srimannarayana is an important Kannada film. To put it like Narayana, the history of Kannada cinema could be divided into before and after Avane Srimannarayana."

Behindwoods gave the film 3 out of 5 and stated, "Rakshit Shetty's stellar performance and good writing make Avane Srimannarayana a quality film!" Karthik Kumar of Hindustan Times stated, "The Rakshit Shetty-starring Kannada film is easily one of the quirkiest mainstream films to have come out in recent times." A. Sharadhaa assigned a score of 3.5 out of 5, in her review for Cinema Express and stated: "The universal theme of the movie is sure to make it appeal to audiences across the country." Umesh Parwani gave 4 out of 5, in his review for Koimoi and stated, "Avane Srimannarayana is a welcome change for those who think what we can with all this 'masala'." Janani K. of India Today gave a mixed review stating "Avane Srimannarayana has a brilliant interval block and the story picks up momentum only after that. If only the makers had concentrated a little more on the initial portion of the film" and assigned a score of 2.5 out of 5. Baradwaj Rangan of Film Companion South wrote: "The film is a joyful pastiche — although one that makes you think the people making it had a lot more fun than those watching it."

== Box office ==
The film opened in more than 1000 multiplex shows per day all over the state, including Tumakuru, Mysuru, Davangere, Belagavi, Mangaluru, and Shivamogga, with 32 premiere screenings, and received good response in single screen theatres, over Mandya and Chitradurga.

Avane Srimannarayana earned ₹5.50 crore on the first day of its release. The film earned ₹6.20 crore from the second day of its release and ₹7.30 crore from the third day. As of three days, the film earned ₹24 crore, as its weekend collections, thus becoming the second highest-grossing film in opening weekend after Yash-starrer K.G.F: Chapter 1. After the first week, the film earned ₹40.30 crore on the domestic box office, with ₹42.30 at the worldwide box office. On 4 January 2020, the makers had announced that the film had earned more than ₹50 crore at the box office.

== Spin-off ==
Rishab Shetty, who makes a cameo appearance in the film as "Cowboy Krishna", registered the title of his character upon witnessing the audience's reaction to the character. The New Indian Express reported that a "high-budget" spin-off film for the character will be produced by H. K. Prakash and written by Shetty and the writers of Avane Srimannarayana.

== Accolades ==
Award (Note: Awards, festivals and organizations are in alphabetical order.)	Date of ceremony (Note: Date is linked to the article about the awards held that year, wherever possible.)	Category	Recipient(s)	Result	Ref.
National Film Awards	25 October 2021	Best Action Direction	Vikram Mor	Won	
South Indian International Movie Awards	18–19 September 2021	Best Film – Kannada	Paramvah Studios, Pushkar Films, Shree Devi Entertainers	Nominated	
South Indian International Movie Awards	18–19 September 2021	Best Debut Director – Kannada	Sachin Ravi	Nominated	
South Indian International Movie Awards	18–19 September 2021	Best Actor – Kannada	Rakshit Shetty	Nominated	
South Indian International Movie Awards	18–19 September 2021	Critic's Best Actor	Rakshit Shetty	Won	
South Indian International Movie Awards	18–19 September 2021	Best Actress – Kannada	Shanvi Srivastava	Nominated	
South Indian International Movie Awards	18–19 September 2021	Best Supporting Actor – Kannada	Pramod Shetty	Nominated	
South Indian International Movie Awards	18–19 September 2021	Best Actor in a Negative Role – Kannada	Balaji Manohar	Nominated	
South Indian International Movie Awards	18–19 September 2021	Best Comedian – Kannada	Achyuth Kumar	Nominated	
South Indian International Movie Awards	18–19 September 2021	Best Music Director – Kannada	B. Ajaneesh Loknath	Nominated	
South Indian International Movie Awards	18–19 September 2021	Best Cinematographer – Kannada	Karm Chawla	Nominated	
South Indian International Movie Awards	18–19 September 2021	Best Choreographer	Imran Sardhariya	Won	
