= Inchara Rao =

Indian playback singer and performer

Inchara Rao is a Bengaluru-based playback singer and performer. She won the award for Best Female Playback Singer SIIMA in 2016, and the Filmfare Awards South 2016 as the Filmfare Award for Best Female Playback Singer – Kannada.

She began her career as a contestant on the first season of the singing reality television show, Sa Re Ga Ma Pa Kannada. She won third place. Afterwards, she released her debut song, Nanna Stylu Berene, from the film Geleya, an item song.

Rao was born in Shimoga, India. She is best known for her song Kareyole from the film Rangitaranga, which won her several awards, including the Filmfare Award for Best Female Playback Singer – Kannada and the SIIMA Award for Best Female Playback Singer – Kannada.

She sings Ayomaya from the movie Godhi Banna Sadharana Mykattu.
