= Spooky College =

Indian Kannada-language psychological horror thriller film

- Theatrical release poster
- Directed by: Bharath G.
- Produced by: H. K. Prakash
- Starring: Vivek Simha; Kushee Ravi
- Cinematography: Manohar Joshi
- Edited by: Srikanth
- Music by: B. Ajaneesh Loknath
- Production company: Shree Devi Entertainers
- Release date: 6 January 2023
- Country: India
- Language: Kannada

Spooky College is a 2023 Indian Kannada-language psychological horror thriller film directed by Bharath GB and starring Vivek Simha and Kushee Ravi.

== Cast ==
- Vivek Simha as Rishikumar
- Kushee Ravi as Khushi
- Prithvi Rashtrakuta
- Prakash Belawadi
- Raghu Ramanakoppa
- Vijay Chendoor
- Hanumante Gowda
- Aravind Bolar
- Sharanya Shetty
- Sudhindra
- Sidlingu Sridhar as Lobo
- Reeshma Nanaiah (special appearance in the song "Mellisure Savigana")

== Production ==
The film was shot in 2020 at a college in Dharwad and a forest in Dandeli.

== Soundtrack ==
The music was composed by B. Ajaneesh Loknath. The song "Mellusire Savigana" from Veera Kesari (1963) was recreated for this film.

== Release ==
The film was initially scheduled to release on 25 November 2022 and was rescheduled to 6 January 2023.

== Reception ==
A critic from The Times of India wrote that "The film is recommended only if you are into a guessing game". A critic from The New Indian Express wrote that "Spooky College would have worked better as a decent dive into exploring young minds, however, the film doesn’t just shine that bright a light on this pertinent issue". A critic from OTT Play wrote that "And even as a surface-level horror film, the film fails from evoking scares - unless you have a lot of time to kill, consider giving the film giving a miss".
