= Pramod Shetty =

Indian actor

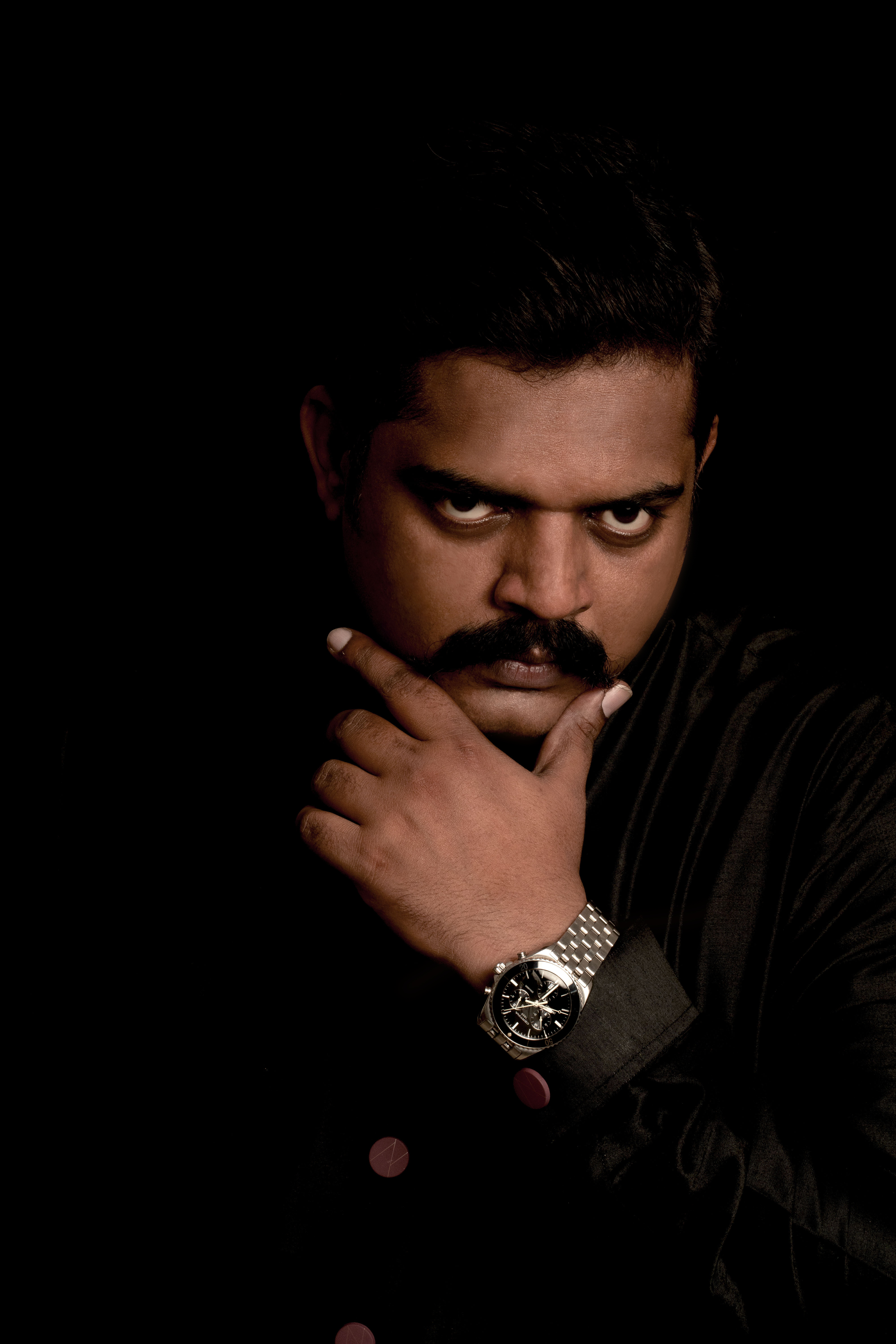
- Pramod Shetty
- Born: Kundapura, Udupi district, Karnataka, India
- Occupations: Thespian; actor; producer
- Years active: 2010–present
- Known for: Ulidavaru Kandanthe; Kirik Party; Avane Sriman Narayana; Kantara
- Spouse: Supreetha Shetty (m. 2010)
- Children: 2

Pramod Shetty is an Indian actor who appears in Kannada films. Pramod started his career as a theater artist. He also appeared in several Kannada serials. Pramod made his film debut in 2010 with film Jugaari. He got recognition for his roles in Ulidavaru Kandanthe (2014) and Kirik Party (2016).

== Career ==
As an actor in Rangsourabha Pramod acted in several plays such as Shatavi, Maatruka, Savu Bantu Savu, Maadari Maadayya and Kaakanakote, for which Pramod bagged a Best actor award at the State level theatre competition for his portrayal of Kaka. Pramod Shetty has worked with the stalwarts of Indian theatre such as Jayashree, Pramod Shiggav, Jayaram Tatachar, Basavalingaih, Krishmurthy Kavattar and Nataraj Honnavali, which helped him hone his craft immensely. Pramod Shetty made his theatre directorial debut with the drama Male Nilluvavrege for his home team Rangasourabha. He also collaborated for international productions Zappadockel and Wok, and Robinson and crusoe produced by the pre-eminent theatre space, Ranga Shankara.

== Personal life ==
Pramod Shetty is married to Supreetha Shetty, an actress, since 2010 and they have two children.

== Filmography ==
=== As actor ===
Year	Title	Role	Notes	Ref.
2010	Jugaari			
2014	Ulidavaru Kandanthe	Dinesh		
2015	RangiTaranga	Manohar Alva		
2016	Kirik Party	Ganesh		
2016	U Turn	Sundar		
2016	Ricky	Naxal Chief		
2018	Churikatte	Member of Mafia		
2018	Sarkari Hi. Pra. Shaale	Shantharama Upadhyaya		
2018	Bell Bottom	Inspector Sahadeva		
2018	Humble Politician Nograj	Shankar		
2018	Days of Borapura			
2018	Kinare	School Master		
2019	Gubbi Mele Brahmastra	Robinhood		
2019	Nanna Prakara	Kumar		
2019	Katha Sangama	Jacob	Also co-producer	
2019	Avane Srimannarayana	Tukaram		
2020	Aadyaa			
2020	ACT 1978	Ram Gopal		
2020	Ondu Shikariya Kathe	Shambu Shetty		
2021	Hero	Don		
2021	Krishna Talkies	Pratap Simha Hulidurga		
2022	Drishya 2	IG Pratap Narayan		
2022	Shokiwala	SP Prathap		
2022	Harikathe Alla Girikathe	Inspector Abhimanyu		
2022	Tootu Madike	Anantu		
2022	Chase			
2022	Hope	Varadaraja		
2022	9 Sullu Kategalu			
2022	Dheeran			
2022	Kantara	Guddi Sudhakara		
2023	Rupayi			
2023	Kabzaa	Cop		
2023	Pentagon		Anthology film; segment Mr Goofy's Café	
2023	Inamdar	Kattale Kalinga		
2023	13			
2024	Night Curfew			
2024	Laughing Buddha	Govardhan		
2024	Ajayante Randam Moshanam	CI Nanjappa Chowta	Malayalam film	
2024	Max	Devraj		
2025	Royal			
2025	Kantara: Chapter 1	Bhogendra		
2026	Surya: The Power of Love			
2026	Super Hit	Poornachandra		
2026	Shesha 2016	Anthony Varghese		
2026	Calendar	Rakesh		
2026	Sannidhanam P.O		Tamil film	

== Awards ==
- South Indian International Movie Awards 2017 – Nominated for Best Comedian for Kirik Party.
- South Indian International Movie Awards 2021 - Nominated for Best Supporting Role Avane Srimannarayana.
- South Indian International Movie Awards 2021 – Nominated for Best Actor in a Debut Role Ondu Shikariya Kathe.
- South Indian International Movie Awards 2022 - Best Actor in a Negative Role for Movie Hero (2021 film)
- Chittara Star Award 2022 - Outstanding Achievement In Kannada Film Industry Chittara.
- Chanakya Award - 2022 - Communicator Of The Year - Films
