= Vidya Vikas Institute of Engineering & Technology =

Vidya Vikas Institute of Engineering and Technology
- Type: Private Engineering College
- Established: 1997
- Affiliations: VTU, AICTE, NBA and NAAC
- Principal: Dr. Karibasappa Kwadiki
- Location: Mysore, Karnataka, India; 12°18′13.3″N 76°42′36.9″E
- Campus: Urban area 65 acres (260,000 m^{2})
- Colors: Blue & purple
- Website: vidyavikasengineering.com

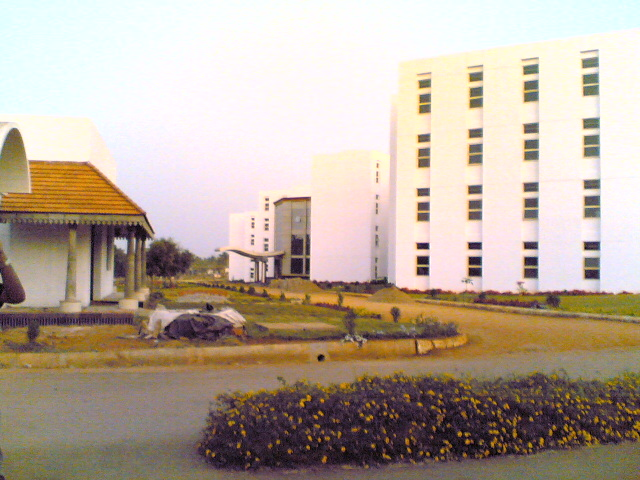
Vidya Vikas Institute of Engineering and Technology

Vidya Vikas Institute of Engineering & Technology (VVIET) is a private engineering college in Mysore, Karnataka, India. It was started in the year 1997, as part of the mission of the Vidya Vikas Educational Trust (VVET).

== History ==
Vidya Vikas Institute of Engineering & Technology (VVIET) is a private engineering college in Mysore, Karnataka, India. It was started in the year 1997, as part of the mission of the Vidya Vikas Educational Trust (VVET).

== Campus ==
The main building includes undergraduate programmes. The postgraduate disciplines are housed in a separate block, offset from main building. The campus also include a hostel. Its grounds include a stadium for cricket, football and concerts.

== Academics ==
VVIET is an engineering college recognized by the Government of Karnataka, and the All India Council of Technical Education (AICTE), New Delhi, affiliated to the Vishweswaraya Technological University (VTU), Belgaum, and governed by Vidya Vikas Educational Trust.

The Institution has five undergraduate programmes and two postgraduate programmes.

=== Undergraduate (UG) ===
Department	Department head
Civil Engineering (CE) (i/c)	Dr. Adarsh S
Computer Science & Engineering (CS & E)	Dr. Somashekhar
Electrical & Electronics Engineering (E & E) (i/c)	Prof. Manjunath
Electronics & Communication Engineering (E & C)	Dr. Suma
Information Science & Engineering (IS & E)	Dr. Chandru AS
Basic Science & Humanities	Dr. C. S. Chidan Kumar
Library and Information Centre	Dr. Shylendra Kumar B (Chief Librarian)

=== Postgraduate (PG) ===
Program	Department head
Management and Business Studies (MBA)	Dr. Vasanthi Reena Williams
Master of Computer Applications (MCA)	Dr. Soumyashri

== Student life ==
Every year, annual college day is celebrated in the middle of the year; mostly during the months of April or May. Apart from this, many academic, co-academic and extra-academic activities are held throughout the year. A three-day state-level technical exhibition was also conducted in late 2012 in the Government of Karnataka - VVIET association. A state-level mathematics conference was also held at the camput in the end of May 2013. Concerts and various college festivals are held on the campus.

== Other institutions under VVET ==
Institution	Affiliation
Vidya Vikas Institute of Engineering and Technology, Mysore	Recognised by AICTE, affiliated to VTU
Vidya Vikas Institute of Management Studies, Mysore	Recognised by AICTE, affiliated to VTU
Vidya Vikas Institute of Engineering & Technology (MCA), Mysore	Recognised by AICTE, affiliated to VTU
Vidya Vikas First Grade College, Mysore	Affiliated to Mysore University
Vidya Vikas Hotel Management and Catering Technology, Mysore	Affiliated to Mysore University
Vidya Vikas Post Graduate Department of Commerce, Mysore	Affiliated to Mysore University
Vidya Vikas First Grade College, Mysore	Affiliated to Mysore University
Vidya Vikas College of Nursing, Mysore	Affiliated to Rajiv Gandhi University of Health Sciences, Bangalore, and recognised by INC
Vidya Vikas College of Polytechnic and ITI, Mysore	Recognised by DTE, and AICTE
Vidya Vikas College of Polytechnic, Bangalore	Recognised by DTE, and AICTE
Vidya Vikas B Ed College, Mysore	Affiliated to Mysore University, recognised by NCTE
