= RangiTaranga =

2015 film by Anup Bhandari

- Theatrical release poster
- Directed by: Anup Bhandari
- Written by: Anup Bhandari
- Produced by: H. K. Prakash
- Starring: Nirup Bhandari; Radhika Chetan; Avantika Shetty; Saikumar; Dileep Shetty
- Cinematography: Lance Kaplan; William David
- Edited by: Praveen Joyappa
- Music by: Songs: Anup Bhandari, Akash Reddy; Score: B. Ajaneesh Loknath
- Production company: Shree Devi Entertainers
- Distributed by: Jayanna Films
- Release date: 3 July 2015 (India)
- Running time: 149 minutes
- Country: India
- Language: Kannada
- Budget: ₹1.5 crore
- Box office: ₹43 crore

RangiTaranga (English: Colourful Wave) is a 2015 Indian Kannada-language psychological thriller written and directed by Anup Bhandari in his debut, and produced by H. K. Prakash, under Shree Devi Entertainers. It features debutantes Nirup Bhandari, Radhika Chetan and Avantika Shetty in the lead roles, along with veteran actor, Saikumar.

Anup Bhandari said that in writing the story for the film, he took inspiration from "Dennana Dennana", a track that featured as the theme song in the 1990s Kannada television soap Guddada Bhoota. In addition to directing the film, Bhandari also scored its soundtrack and penned the lyrics. It featured cinematography by US-based cinematographer Lance Kaplan and William David, the former of whom had previously collaborated with Bhandari on a short film.

RangiTaranga is set in Kamarottu, a fictional village in the coastal region of Karnataka, at Indu's ancestral village, where she, along with her husband Gautham Suvarna, decide to perform a ritual to ward off evil spirits. However, Indu goes missing, which leads Gautham and a reporter named Sandhya to investigate the disappearance of pregnant women (as well as Gautham's unknown past). Parts of the filming took place in Mysore, Bangalore, Madikeri, Puttur, Sira, Ottapalam, Alappuzha and Ooty. Upon theatrical release on 3 July 2015, the film received overwhelmingly positive reviews from both critics and audience. The film went on to become the highest-grossing Kannada film of 2015. The film made it into the list of productions eligible for the 88th Academy Awards, but it did not make it into the final list of nominations.

== Plot ==
Gautham Suvarna is a novelist, leading a reclusive life in Ooty. His latest novel is titled RangiTaranga, a word which might hold the key to his past. Indu, Gautham's wife, is a soft-natured girl who paints the cover pages of all of Gautham's novels. Sandhya, a self-proclaimed reporter from Bangalore, is in search of an anonymous writer who goes by the pen name Anushka. She finds out about the writer from a publisher and sets on a journey to find him. A pregnant Indu finds herself in trouble when she repetitively gets nightmares of an accident. She then convinces Gautham to visit her ancestral home in the village of Kamarottu in order to perform some rituals to solve her problems. Upon their arrival in Kamarottu, Gautham befriends the post master Kalinga and the elderly school head master Shankar.

During their stay in the village, Indu experiences strange occurrences in the house, including an incident where Indu is almost pulled into a well while she is fetching a bucket of water. The incident provokes Gautham to investigate the village further. He learns from Kalinga that the well contains Brahmarakshasa (devil) and that the Kamarottu home is haunted by a ghost (Guddada Bhoota). Gautham's investigation also irks the powerful men in the village: on one occasion, one of the henchmen of a powerful politician attacks Gautham, leaving him injured. Meanwhile, Sandhya's trail leads her to Kamarottu. Indu goes missing one night and later, the local police declare that she was killed six years ago in an accident. Confused, Gautham starts searching for her and discovers an illegal sand mafia, led by the corrupt politician Mahabala Hegde, along with the local police, which leads him to conclude that their attack on him was merely to cover up their illegal activity.

Sandhya meets Gautham during the investigation of his wife's disappearance and helps him in discovering a diary titled Harini. Through this diary, Gautham discovers that the woman who he believed to be his wife Indu, was actually Harini, a yoga instructor from Bangalore, and that he himself is not Gautham. Indu and her husband Gautham were in reality, Harini's friends. In a desperate and impulsive attempt to escape further abuse, Harini killed a man who was abusive to her and threatened her after she spurned his physical advances. Horrified by the realization that she has killed a person and terrified by the prospect of legal repercussions, she confides in Indu and Gautham, who decide to take her to Kamarottu and create an alibi for her. It is revealed that Gautham was actually Siddharth, an aspiring writer/singer who was in love with Sandhya.

Telling her that he will be back soon, Siddharth leaves for a bike trip with his college friends. Under a thick blanket of fog, Siddharth and his friend on a motorbike collides with the car carrying Indu, Gautham and Harini, near the Kamarottu junction. Harini and Siddharth, who has lost his memory, are the sole survivors of the accident. Harini, reluctant to go back to her previous life, assumes the identity of her now-dead friend Indu, and informes the authorities and Siddharth that he is her husband Gautham. With nothing else to go on to, Siddharth accepts this as the truth. After learning the truth about his past, Gautham and Sandhya infiltrate the police station and search the records. They find a strange coincidence in the missing person files: every year on July 7, a woman goes missing in the village. When they check with the families of the missing women, they learn that they were pregnant—like Indu—and that the Guddada Bhoota is responsible for the abductions.

They initially suspect the local doctor, as he is the only person who has access to the pregnancy reports in the village, but he reveals that his girlfriend, Anasuya, was the first victim of the Guddada Bhoota. After connecting the dots, Gautham and Sandhya realise that the pregnancy reports are delivered from the hospital to the patient via post, and the only person who has access to all the posts is Kalinga. After enquiring Shankar about further information, they deduce that Kalinga is the Guddada Bhoota and is responsible for the abductions. Kalinga's wife, Anasuya, had an extramarital affair with the local doctor; on July 7, when Kalinga found out, Anasuya did not reveal the doctor's identity, and he mistook Angara, a mentally ill man from the village, to be her lover and beheaded him.

Kalinga tortured his wife in an abandoned house on the hillock, finally killing her after 11 days. After this incident, he became mentally tormented and began killing other pregnant women on the same day (July 18) while donning the Bhoota Vesha (Devil's attire). After learning this, Siddharth tracks Kalinga down with the help of Shankar, fearing that Kalinga is about to kill Harini (as it is July 18). Upon finding his hideout, Siddharth engages in a brutal fight with Kalinga and eventually kills him, saving Harini. Later, Harini gives birth to a child. Sandhya wishes Siddharth well, telling him that he is probably better off being with Harini and his newborn child. She leaves without revealing her relationship with Siddharth or his true identity, nursing a broken heart.

== Cast ==
- Nirup Bhandari as Gautham Suvarna / Siddarth
- Radhika Chetan as Indu Suvarna / Harini Ranganath
- Avantika Shetty as Sandhya Bhargav
- Saikumar as Thenkabail Ravindra "Kalinga" Bhat
- Pramod Shetty as Manohar Alva
- Ananth Velu as Shankar
- Shilpa Singh as Shilpa Rao
- Arvind Rao as Inspector Basavaraj Haadimani
- William David as Naarnu
- Chetan Raj as Garnal Babu
- Siddu Moolimani as Nilesh Gowda aka Pandu
- Roshni Kore as Panchami aka Panchali
- Dinesh Siriyara as Angaara
- Shanker Ashwath as Mahabala Hegde
- Anup Bhandari as Gautham Suvarna
- Srinath Vasistha
- Swapna Raj
- Renuka
- Karthik Rao Kordale as Rafique

== Soundtrack ==
RangiTaranga

Soundtrack album by Anup Bhandari
- Released: 16 June 2015
- Genre: Feature film soundtrack
- Length: 29:58
- Label: Lahari Music

Anup Bhandari chronology
RangiTaranga (2015)	Rajaratha (2017)

B. Ajaneesh Loknath scored the film's background music and Anup Bhandari, Akash Reddy composed for its soundtrack, also writing lyrics for all but one track. The soundtrack album consists of 10 tracks, featuring a flute bit of the track "Dennana Dennana", a karaoke of "Akka Pakka" and a dialogue bit "Ashu Kavi Kalinga" mouthed by Saikumar. The track "Dennana Dennana" which has its lyrics in Tulu was the theme song of the Kannada soap opera Guddada Bhootha that was first aired on DD Chandana in the 1990s and re-telecast on Zee Kannada between 2013 and 2014. It was used in the film after rights were given to Bhandari by its lyricist Sadananda Suvarna. The album was released on 16 June 2015 in Bangalore.

Track list
No.	Title	Lyrics	Artist(s)	Length
1.	"Akka Pakka"	Anup Bhandari	Anup Bhandari, Suchitra Lata	2:32
2.	"Kele Cheluve"	Anup Bhandari	Vijay Prakash, Deepika T., Anup Bhandari	4:00
3.	"Ee Sanje"	Anup Bhandari	Abhay Jodhpurkar, Gokul Abhishek, Monisha	4:35
4.	"Nee Kele Vaduve"	Anup Bhandari	Deepika T	3:44
5.	"Kareyole"	Anup Bhandari	Inchara Rao	2:04
6.	"Dennana Dennana"	Sadananda Suvarna, Sudhakar Saaja	Supriya Raghunandan	2:55
7.	"Kele Cheluve" (Yakshagana)	Anup Bhandari	Satish Patla, Deepika T., Anup Bhandari	4:00
8.	"Dennana" (Flute)		Anup Bhandari	2:55
9.	"Akka Pakka" (Karaoke)		Anup Bhandari	2:32
10.	"Ashu Kavi Kalinga" (Bit)	Anup Bhandari	Sai Kumar	0:41
Total length:				29:58

=== Critics review ===
The critics received the album well and noted for its non-usage of words from the English and Hindi languages in its tracks, which was the hitherto trend.

== Release and reception ==
The film was given the "U/A" (Parental Guidance) certificate by the Regional Censor Board. It was released theatrically in theatres across Karnataka on 3 July 2015. Upon release, the film met with universal critical acclaim, who acclaimed the film's screenplay, film score, cinematography and the acting performance of Saikumar. After a tremendous response at the domestic market, the film was released in Germany on 1 August 2015, followed by the Netherlands and Ireland. Following this it was released in the United States, the United Kingdom, Canada, New Zealand, Australia, Norway, Singapore, Hong Kong, Japan, Sweden, Finland, Switzerland, Malaysia and Denmark among other countries.

Reviewing the film for The Hindu, Archana Nathan calling the film "well-made thriller" credited the performance of all lead actors and the cinematography, and wrote, "The director also successfully captures the flavour of the region and gets the essence and accent of the language right." A. Sharadhaa of The New Indian Express described the film as "beautiful, chilling and bold" and wrote, "The film steeped in the strong ethos of a bygone culture, is beautifully etched and well enacted by newcomers. Anup’s storyline does not differentiate between the shades of good and evil. The journey exposes secrets but does not lose its balance. The director has showcased his understanding of horror, friendship, revenge and forgiveness, well." Writing for Deccan Herald, S. Viswanath called the film "[a]n eerie romantic thriller". On the cinematography, he wrote, "... Lance Kaplan and William David capture the verdant and scenic vicissitudes of mountainous ravines and quietly flowing rivers of coastal Mangaluru, as also the famous tea gardens and hills of Ooty." He concluded acclaiming the screenplay and the film's music.

Sunayana Suresh of The Times of India rated the film 3/5 and wrote, "[the film is] visually breath-taking and packed with a lot of punch, be it in both the acting and the technical departments." Crediting the acting performance of Saikumar, she added, "The other highlights of the film apart from Anup's writing are his music and lyrics. The songs are catchy, though they seem a tad too many in the second half. B Ajaneesh Lokanath's background score is on par with some of the best global thrillers, as is the cinematography by Lance Kaplan and William David." Having rated the film 3.5/5 Shyam Prasad S. of Bangalore Mirror felt that the film was "a very good attempt and packs enough thrills". He, however, felt that it lacked pace with the songs and these few scenes dragging the film through. He concluded writing, "The cinematography makes the film look like a live presentation rather than something happening on the screen. The background music is equally apt and very well ingrained into the film" and highlighted the acting performance of Saikumar. Shashiprasad S. M. of Deccan Chronicle rated the film 3/5 and wrote, "the director makes an impressive debut with this good suspense thriller. Anup Bhandari who has penned the script has showcased a realistic and scary experience for the audience." He highlighted the cinematography and songs in the film, and criticized its slow pace and editing.

== Box office ==
With medium occupancy at theatres in Karnataka on the first three days after theatrical release, it gradually improved and registered 100% in many theatres following good reviews by audiences and word-of-mouth marketing. Following the first week of release, the film performed very well at the domestic box office. At the end of its 300 days from release, it had collected more than ₹38 crore in Karnataka alone with the total worldwide gross collections reported to be around ₹43 crores. The movie completed 365 days run at 2 theatres in Bangalore- INOX Mantri Square in Malleswaram and Cinepolis Royal Meenakshi Mall.

=== Overseas ===
It performed strongly in the US upon release on 14 August in 36 screens. It collected US$200,802 (₹13.1 million), which trade analyst Taran Adarsh called an "Excellent start". The second day collections of US$75,000 (₹49 lakh) was more than that of any Indian film there. By the end of the first weekend of the three-day run, it managed to break the lifetime records set by all previous Kannada films in the United States and became the highest grosser. In the process, RangiTaranga also became the first Kannada film to make it to the weekend box office list of The New York Times. By the end of September, it became the first Kannada film to complete a 50 days run in the US, and collected ₹2.1 crore (US$220,000).

== Awards and nominations ==
Ceremony	Category	Nominee	Result	Ref.
2015 Karnataka State Film Awards	Best Debut Film Of Newcomer Director	Director - Anup Bhandari; Producer - H.K.Prakash	Won	
1st IIFA Utsavam	Best Picture	H.K.Prakash	Won	
1st IIFA Utsavam	Best Director	Anup Bhandari	Won	
1st IIFA Utsavam	Best Performance In A Leading Role – Male	Nirup Bhandari	Nominated	
1st IIFA Utsavam	Best Performance In A Leading Role – Female	Radhika Chetan	Nominated	
1st IIFA Utsavam	Best Performance In A Supporting Role – Male	Sai Kumar	Won	
1st IIFA Utsavam	Best Performance In A Supporting Role – Female	Renuka	Nominated	
1st IIFA Utsavam	Best Performance In A Comic Role	Karthik Rao	Nominated	
1st IIFA Utsavam	Best Performance In A Negative Role	Arvind Rao	Won	
1st IIFA Utsavam	Best Music Direction	Anup Bhandari	Won	
1st IIFA Utsavam	Best Lyrics	Anup Bhandari (for "Kareyole")	Won	
1st IIFA Utsavam	Best Playback Singer - Female	Inchara Rao (for "Kareyole")	Nominated	
1st IIFA Utsavam	Best Background Music	B. Ajaneesh Loknath	Won	
1st IIFA Utsavam	Best Sound Mixing	Murali Rayasam	Won	
63rd Filmfare Awards South	Best Film	H.K.Prakash	Won	
63rd Filmfare Awards South	Best Director	Anup Bhandari	Won	
63rd Filmfare Awards South	Best Supporting Actor	Saikumar	Won	
63rd Filmfare Awards South	Best Supporting Actress	Avantika Shetty	Nominated	
63rd Filmfare Awards South	Best Music Director	Anup Bhandari	Nominated	
63rd Filmfare Awards South	Best Playback Singer - Female	Inchara Rao	Won	
5th SIIMA Awards	Best Film	H.K.Prakash	Nominated	
5th SIIMA Awards	Best Actor in a Supporting Role	Arvind Rao	Nominated	
5th SIIMA Awards	Best Actor in a Negative Role	Saikumar	Won	
5th SIIMA Awards	Best Debut Actor	Nirup Bhandari	Nominated	
5th SIIMA Awards	Best Debut Actress	Radhika Chetan	Nominated	
5th SIIMA Awards	Best Debut Director	Anup Bhandari	Won	
5th SIIMA Awards	Best Music Director	Anup Bhandari	Nominated	
5th SIIMA Awards	Best Lyricist	Anup Bhandari	Won	
5th SIIMA Awards	Best Playback Singer - Female	Inchara Rao	Won	
IBNLive Movie Awards	Best Director South	Anup Bhandari	Won	
