= Avantika Shetty =

Indian actress

- Born: Mangalore, Karnataka, India born on 1st August 1989
- Occupations: Actress, model, dance, dancer
- Years active: 2008–present

Avantika Shetty is an Indian actress and advertiser working primarily in Kannada cinema. She made her film debut in RangiTaranga (2015) which found a worldwide release and declared a blockbuster, earning her a nomination at the Filmfare Awards for Best Supporting Actress. Prior to films, Shetty acted in a few television series and short films in Mumbai.

== Early life and career ==
Avantika Shetty was born in a Tulu-speaking Tuluva Bunt community in Mangalore. She made her big screen debut with debutante Anup Bhandari's directorial Kannada thriller-drama RangiTaranga (2015), playing the role of Sandhya Bhargav, a journalist on the search of a mysterious writer with the pen name Anashku played by another debutante, Nirup Bhandari. Upon release, the film was a sleeper hit which went onto become a blockbuster through the word-of-mouth reviews. The film was released across many countries and won favorable reviews. The film was declared as one of the highest-grossing films in Kannada cinema. Shetty earned a nomination at the Filmfare Awards for her portrayal as the supporting actress. Following this successful debut, she signed her second assignment for R. Anantharaju's forthcoming horror-comedy film Kalpana 2 opposite Upendra. A remake of Raghava Lawrence's successful Tamil film, Kanchana 2, Shetty reprises the role played by Tapsee Pannu in the original. She has reportedly teamed up yet again with the Bhandari brothers for their upcoming project titled Rajaratha which was unveiled on the Dancing Stars 3 reality show by actor V. Ravichandran.

== Filmography ==
=== Films ===
- All films are in Kannada, unless otherwise noted.

Year	Film	Role	Notes
2015	RangiTaranga	Sandhya Bhargav	Nominated, Filmfare Award for Best Supporting Actress – Kannada
2016	Kalpana 2	Nandini	
2018	Raju Kannada Medium	Nisha	
2018	Rajaratha	Megha	

=== Television ===
Year	Title	Role	Language	Channel
2008	Dharam Veer	Antara	Hindi	NDTV Imagine
2009-10	Sajan Ghar Jaana Hai	Gauri Sumer Raghuvanshi	Hindi	STAR Plus
2012-15	Na Aana Is Des Laado	Ragini	Hindi	Colors TV
2019-2020	Mere Dad Ki Dulhan	Anjali Amber Sharma	Hindi	Sony Entertainment

=== Short films ===
Year	Title	Role	Language	Notes
2011	Arranged Marriage	Neha	Hindi	
2013	Bin Tere	Ruby	Hindi	
