= IIFA Utsavam =

- Current: 3rd IIFA Utsavam
- Awarded for: Excellence in cinematic achievements for South Indian films
- Country: India
- Presented by: International Indian Film Academy
- First award: 2016
- Final award: 2024
- Website: Official website

Television/radio coverage
- Network: Gemini TV (Telugu); Sun TV (Tamil); Surya TV (Malayalam); Udaya TV (Kannada)
- Produced by: Wizcraft International

The IIFA Utsavam rewards the artistic and technical achievements of the South Indian film industry. The ceremony is organised by Wizcraft International, the team behind the IIFA Awards, and represents Tamil cinema, Telugu cinema, Malayalam cinema and Kannada cinema.

The ceremony was instituted in 2016, after the 2015 South Indian floods had delayed the event from December 2015. The Awards are presented in separate parts on two different days. On the first day the most promising upcoming South Indian film artistes from the Tamil and Malayalam film industries are honoured, while the second day honours artists & technicians of the Telugu and Kannada film industries. The Award nominees are selected by a jury of senior artistes and professionals and voted for by public polling.

== History ==
In October 2015, the team behind the IIFA Awards announced that they would create a platform titled IIFA Utsavam, in order to reward the achievements of the South Indian film industry. The inaugural show was announced to be held in Hyderabad between 4 and 6 December. On 3 December 2015, Andre Timmins of the IIFA Management announced that the show would be postponed as a result of the 2015 Chennai floods and that the event would be held as a fundraiser at a later date. The show was subsequently rearranged and held on 24 and 25 January, with the proceeds of the events going on to help with recuperation efforts from the 2015 Chennai floods.

As a part of the inaugural event, the makers organised the FICC–IIIFA Media & Entertainment business conclave in order to create a synthesis of business and entertainment, with Ramesh Sippy, and Rakeysh Omprakash Mehra being amongst the guest speakers. The organisers stated that the next two annual shows would be held in Hyderabad, before taking the show abroad.

== Ceremonies ==
| Ceremony | Date | Best Picture | Host(s) | Venue | City, Country |
|---|---|---|---|---|---|
| 1st | 24–25 January 2016 | Baahubali: The Beginning (Telugu); Baahubali: The Beginning (Tamil); Ennu Ninte Moideen (Malayalam); RangiTaranga (Kannada) | Allu Sirish, Navdeep, Regina Cassandra (Telugu); Shiva, Venkat Prabhu (Tamil); Pearle Maaney, Suraj Venjaramood (Malayalam); Vijay Raghavendra, Akul Balaji (Kannada) | Gachibowli Athletic Stadium | Hyderabad, India |
| 2nd | 28–29 March 2017 | Janatha Garage (Telugu); Irudhi Suttru (Tamil); Puli Murugan (Malayalam); Kirik Party (Kannada) | Rana Daggubati, Nani (Telugu); Rana Daggubati, Shiva (Tamil); Tini Tom, Pearle Maaney (Malayalam); Akul Balaji, Meghana Gaonkar (Kannada) | Hyderabad International Convention Centre | Hyderabad, India |
| 3rd | 27 September 2024 | Dasara (Telugu); Jailer (Tamil); 2018 (Malayalam); Kaatera (Kannada) | Rana Daggubati, Teja Sajja (Telugu); Sathish, Divya Menon (Tamil); Akul Balaji, Vijay Raghavendra (Kannada); Pearle Maaney, Sudev Nair (Malayalam) | Etihad Arena | Abu Dhabi, United Arab Emirates |

== Award categories ==
- Best Picture
- Best Director
- Best Actor
- Best Actress
- Best Supporting Actor
- Best Supporting Actress
- Best Actor in a Negative Role
- Best Actor in a Comic Role
- Best Music Director
- Best Lyricist
- Best Male Playback Singer
- Best Female Playback Singer
- Best Story
- Best Screenplay
- Best Makeup Artist
