= Anup Bhandari =

Indian filmmaker (born 1982)

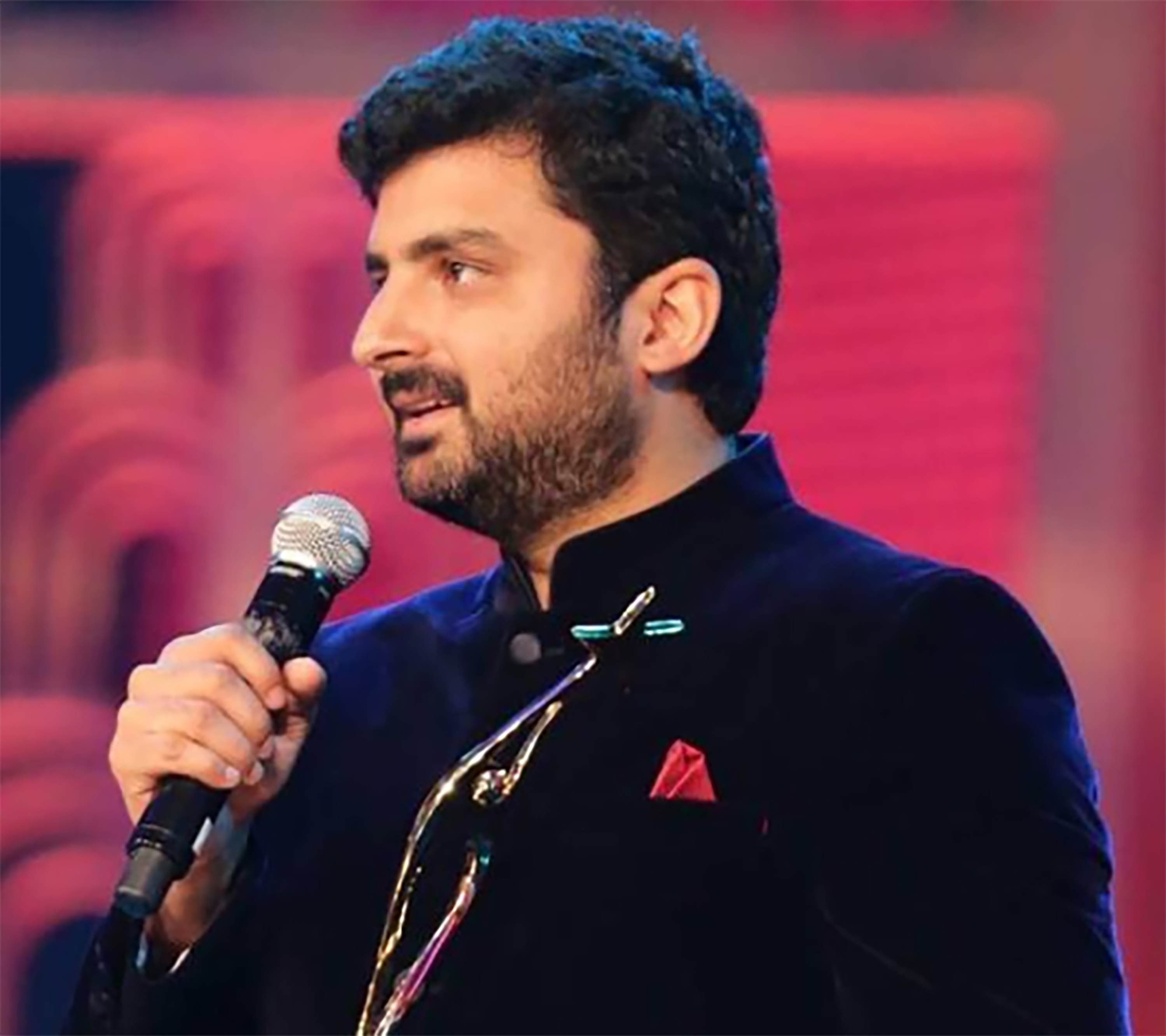
- Bhandari at SIIMA Awards
- Born: 2 March 1982 (age 44); Puttur, Karnataka, India
- Education: VVIET
- Occupations: Film director, composer, lyricist
- Years active: 2015–present
- Spouse: Neetha Shetty
- Children: 1
- Relatives: Nirup Bhandari (brother)

Anup Bhandari (born 2 March 1982) is an Indian film director, composer and lyricist who works primarily in Kannada cinema. He made his directorial début with the mystery thriller film Rangitaranga (2015), featuring his brother Nirup Bhandari, with whom he frequently collaborates.

== Early life ==
Anup Bhandari was born on 2 March 1982 in Puttur, Karnataka to Sudhakar Bhandary, the director of the television serials Premada Kadambari (1996) and Kurigalu Sir Kurigalu, and Rathna Bhandary. He was brought up in Mysore, where he started learning piano at the age of four and obtained his bachelor's degree in Information Science from Vidya Vikas Institute of Engineering and Technology. After graduating, he joined Infosys Technologies as a Software Engineer in Mysore and eventually moved to New York, where he worked for almost a decade before returning to India to make his debut feature film.

== Career ==
Bhandari started off making short films while working for Infosys and won several awards. While in the US, he directed a short film called Words starring Russell Harvard. This paved way for his debut feature film RangiTaranga, starring his brother Nirup Bhandari, Radhika Narayan, Avantika Shetty and Sai Kumar.

RangiTaranga turned out to be one of the biggest blockbusters. It also opened overseas market for Kannada films in a big way. It became the first Kannada film to release in many countries, the first Kannada film to appear on the New York Box Office Listing and the first and only Kannada film to run for 50 days in USA. RangiTaranga was also one of the 305 films shortlisted for the Academy Awards (The Oscars) but did not make it to the final nominations.

Anup won several awards for his direction, music direction and lyrics including Filmfare, SIIMA, IIFA and Karnataka State Award. Anup followed this up with Rajaratha starring Nirup and Avantika Shetty. The film is narrated from the point of view of a bus, which was voiced by Puneeth. He also provided the music and wrote lyrics for Rockline Productions' Aadi Lakshmi Puraana directed by V. Priya and starring Nirup and Radhika Pandit. 2022 saw the release of the mystery thriller Vikrant Rona.

== Personal life ==
Anup Bhandari is married to Neetha Shetty, who works as costume designer for all his films. They have a daughter Nishka Bhandari. His brother Nirup Bhandari is an actor, who has featured in all of his directorials.

== Filmography ==
=== As film director ===
Year	Film	Notes	Ref.
2015	RangiTaranga		
2018	Rajaratha		
2022	Vikrant Rona		
2026	Billa Ranga Baashaa †		
TBA	Ashwattama †		

=== As an actor ===
Year	Film	Role	Notes
2010	Words	'R' announcer	Short film
2015	RangiTaranga	Gautham Suvarna	
2018	Rajaratha	Media reporter	Cameo appearances
2022	Vikrant Rona	Old photographer	Cameo appearances
2025	Just Married	Anand	

=== As lyricist ===
Year	Film	Notes	Ref.
2015	RangiTaranga		
2018	Rajaratha		
2019	Aadi Lakshmi Puraana		
2019	Dabangg 3	Kannada dubbed version	
2021	Kotigobba 3		
2022	Vikrant Rona		
2024	Max		
2026	Billa Ranga Baashaa †		
TBA	Ashwattama †		

=== Short films ===
Year	Title	Ref.
2005	Life Meets Life	
—N/a	Nemesis	
2010	Words	

== Discography ==
=== As composer and playback singer ===
Year	Title	Songs	Score	Notes	Ref.
—N/a	Kurigalu Sir Kurigalu	Yes	No	TV serial; composer of title song	
2015	RangiTaranga	Yes	No	Playback singer for "Akka Pakka"	
2018	Rajaratha	Yes	No	Playback singer for "Gandaka", "Banana" and "Mundhe Banni"	
2019	Aadi Lakshmi Puraana	Yes	Yes	Playback singer for "Mutthaala"	

== Awards ==
Movie	Award	Category	Result	Ref.
RangiTaranga	2015 Karnataka State Film Awards	Best Debut Film Of Newcomer Director	Won	
RangiTaranga	1st IIFA Utsavam	Best Picture	Won	
RangiTaranga	1st IIFA Utsavam	Best Direction	Won	
RangiTaranga	1st IIFA Utsavam	Best Music Direction	Won	
RangiTaranga	1st IIFA Utsavam	Best Lyrics (for "Kareyole")	Won	
RangiTaranga	63rd Filmfare Awards South	Best Director	Won	
RangiTaranga	63rd Filmfare Awards South	Best Music Director	Nominated	
RangiTaranga	5th South Indian International Movie Awards	Best Film- Kannada	Nominated	
RangiTaranga	5th South Indian International Movie Awards	Best Debut Director	Won	
RangiTaranga	5th South Indian International Movie Awards	Best Music Director	Nominated	
RangiTaranga	5th South Indian International Movie Awards	Best Lyricist for "Ee Sanje"	Won	
RangiTaranga	IBNLive Movie Awards	Best Director South	Won	
