= Sukrutha Wagle =

Indian actress and model

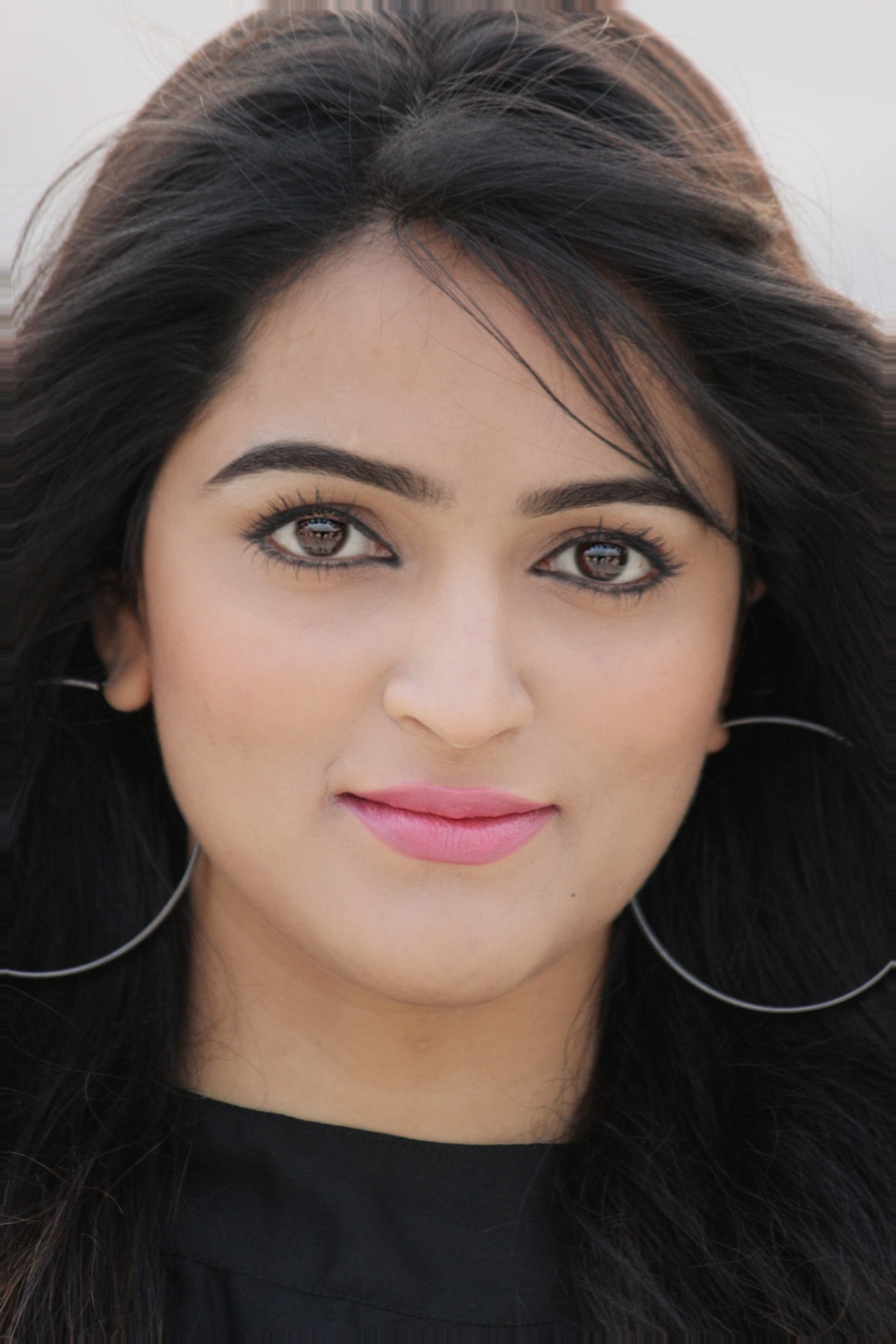
- 2020 Passionate Heroin
- Born: Manipal, Karnataka, India
- Education: Bachelor of Law and Bsc Hotel Management
- Occupation: Actor Model Entrepreneur

Sukrutha Wagle is an Indian actress and model who works as lead actress inKannada film industry and Telugu film industry. She made her debut with the state award-winning Kannada film Jatta under "Omkar Movies".

== Personal life ==
Born in Manipal, Karnataka, Sukrutha is daughter of Businessman Wagle she has 1 sibling and even she a law graduate from same college . She pursued Bachelor of Science in Hospitality & Catering Management from Pondicherry. Further, after pursuing Master of Science she completed Bachelor of Laws from Vaikunta Baliga College of Law. She also holds Diploma in Business Administration and Diploma in Aviation Hospitality.

== Career ==
Wagle started her career as a model and a photographer. Manager Kumar Jagannath introduced her to the director B. M. Giriraj, who directed of her debut film Jatta. The movie won best film award at Karnataka State Film Awards. She also won best actress award at Chitrasanthe Awards.

Her next film was a love story by director Suni. She plays the daughter of Srinagar Kitty in the film Bahuparaak. She acted as one of the heroine in a multi starrer movie Kiragoorina Gayyaligalu, directed by Sumana Kittur. It was a famous novel based film written by Poornachandra Tejaswi.

She took a break from acting in 2019 to pursue higher studies. In 2023 she made her comeback and debut on OTT platform with a Telugu Legal webseries Vyavastha directed by Anand Ranga which became the super hit webseries of the year on Zee5 OTT platform.

Later she joined Martin a pan Indian movie starring Dhruva Sarja and written by Arjun Sarja which is produced by Uday mehta and directed by A. P. Arjun. She plays the role of under cover agent from Pakistan.

She also starred in Max, a pan Indian film starring Sudeepa and produced by legendary producer Kalaipuli S. Thanu, she becomes the first Kannada actress to star in two pan Indian films. Later she starred in Kapati which was a female centric film; she was appreciated again for her versatility by the noted critics and the audiences.

== Filmography ==
Year	Film	Language	Notes
2013	Jatta	Kannada	Debut
2014	Bahuparaak	Kannada	
2015	Flop for Hit	Kannada	
2015	Mythri (2015 film)	Kannada	
2016	Vishala Hridayada Kannadigaru	Kannada	
2016	Kiragoorina Gayyaligalu	Kannada	
2017	Dayavittu Gamanisi	Kannada	
2018	Megha Alias Maggi		
2019	Rama Chakkani Seetha	Telugu	
2024	Martin	Kannada	
2024	Max	Kannada	
2025	Kapati	Kannada	

== Webseries ==
Year	Series	Language	OTT platform
2023	Vyavastha	Telugu	Zee5

== Reality Shows ==
Year	Program	Notes
2014	Seere beka Seere	Celebrity Contestant
2015	Swalpa Adjust Madkoli	Guest Contestant
2015	That antha heli	Celebrity Contestant
2016	Super minute	Charity fund raising celeb game- Colors Kannada
2016	Bigg boss Kannada Season 4	Wild Card Contestant – Colors Kannada
