= Sethu (actor) =

Indian actor

Sethu G Pillai
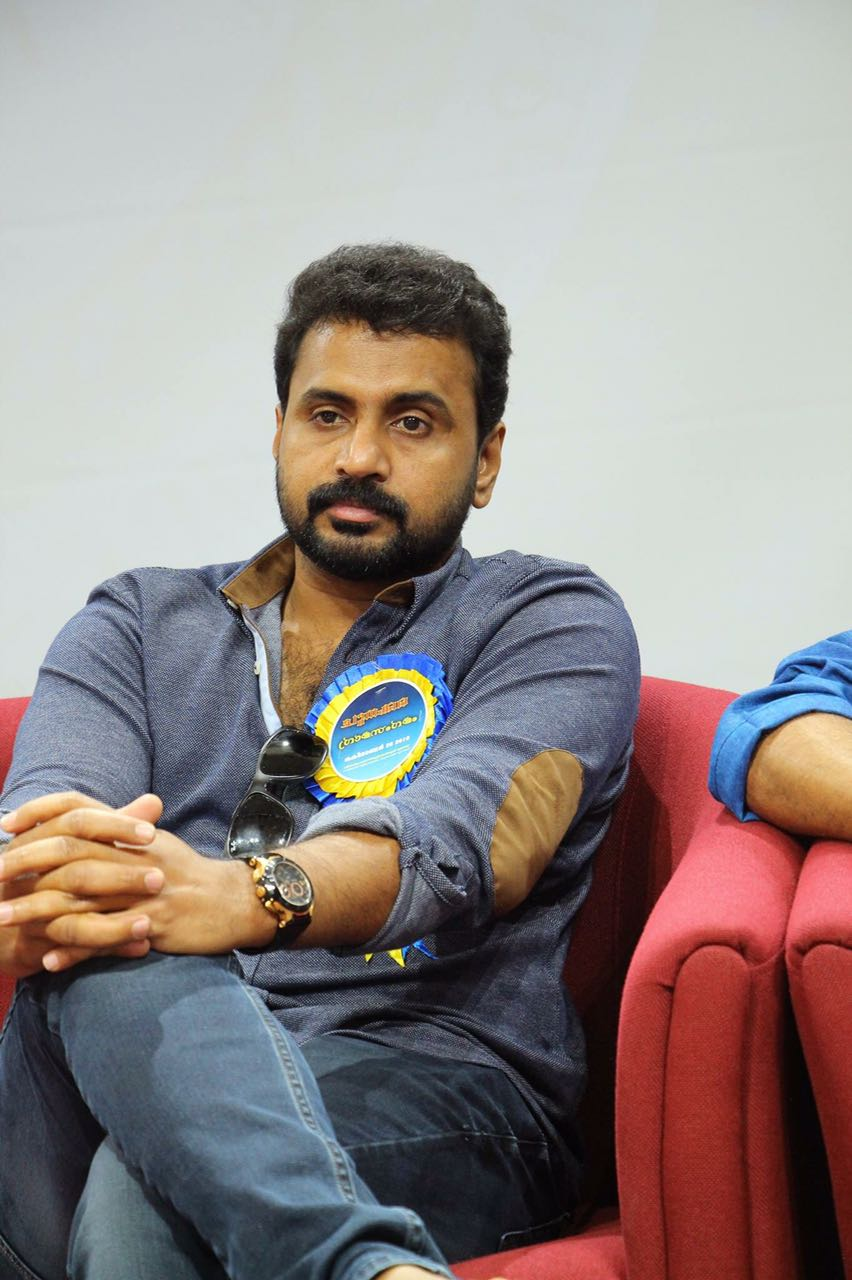
- Sethu Mynaa at a function
- Born: Sethu G. Pillai; 13 March; Mavelikara, Kerala, India
- Other name: Settu
- Occupations: Actor, Producer, Businessman
- Years active: 2010–present

Sethu G Pillai is an Indian actor who appears in South Indian language films. He was born in Mavelikkara, Alappuzha district, Kerala. He has acted in films including Mynaa, 100 Degree Celsius and Manadhil Maayam Seidhai. He has produced movies including Kokki and Karuppusamy Kuththagaithaarar.

== Career ==
Sethu started his cinema career in the Tamil film industry with the movie Mynaa, released in November, 2010 and produced by John Max and directed by Prabhu Solomon. Sethu played the role of DSP Bhaskar, a police officer. This led to him being popularly known as Mynaa Sethu.

In 2014, Sethu acted in a Tamil / Telugu bilingual film called Manadhil Maayam Seidhai in Tamil and Manasunu Maaya Seyake in Telugu. In the same year, he was in the Malayalam movie 100 Degree Celsius. In 2015, Sethu acted in the Tamil action movie Kadavul Paathi Mirugam Paathi.

Sethu has produced the movies Kokki and Karuppusamy Kuththagaithaarar.

== Filmography ==
As Actor

Year	Movie	Role	Language	Notes
2010	Mynaa	Bhaskar	Tamil	
2013	Thank You	Dev Menon	Malayalam	
2014	100 Degree Celsius	Aravind	Malayalam	
2014	Manasunu Maaya Seyake	Jai	Telugu	
2015	Kadavul Paathi Mirugam Paathi		Tamil	
2025	Myyal		Tamil	

As Producer

Year	Movie	Language	Notes
2006	Kokki	Tamil	
2007	Karuppusamy Kuththagaithaarar	Tamil	

== Personal life ==
Sethu was born in Mavelikkara in Alappuzha district of Kerala.
