= Full House Entertainment =

Full House Entertainment is a film production and an event management company based in Chennai, India. The company was founded by Jaison Pullikottil in the year 2012. The company is very actively involved in movie production and organizing large scale outdoor events. The company's flagship event is Madras Market, which is a 2 day shopping festival which attracts a huge crowd and happens twice every year.

== First Movie ==
Manasunu Maaya Seyake (Manadhil Maayam Seidhai) was the first movie to be produced by Full House Entertainment. It is a bilingual movie and while the Telugu version has already released and made a good impact, the Tamil version of the same is slated to be released later.

Other notable movies produced by Full House Entertainment include Kadavul Paathi Mirugam Paathi, an action thriller and Aamayum Muyalum, directed by Priyadarshan. Aamayum Muyalum is a remake of his Bollywood blockbuster, Malamal Weekly, and was received well by the audience.

== Upcoming Projects ==
Full House Entertainment is organizing the South Indian International Movie Awards in Dubai in August 2015. This will be the first overseas event by the company. Apart from this, the company is organizing a large scale surfing competition in Mahabalipuram near Chennai and the next edition of Madras Market in Chennai.

Full House is also in talks about producing an Indo Azeri bilingual movie, which will be the first such collaboration ever.

== List of Movies by Full House Entertainment ==
- Manasunu Maaya Seyake (Telugu)
- Manadhil Maayam Seidhai (Tamil)
- Aamayum Muyalum (Malayalam)
- Kadavul Paathi Mirugam Paathi (Tamil)

== List of Events by Full House Entertainment ==
- Madras Market I (Feb 2013)
- Madras Maalai (June 2013)
- Madras Market II (August 2013)
- Madras Market III (Jan 2014)
- Retro Concert by Srinivas (April 2014)
- Madras Market IV (August 2014)
- Madras Market V (Feb 2015)
