= Vindhya Victim Verdict V3 =

- Poster
- Directed by: P. Amudhavanan
- Written by: P. Amudhavanan
- Starring: Varalaxmi Sarathkumar; Paavana Gowda; Esther Anil
- Cinematography: Siva Prabhu
- Edited by: Nagooran
- Music by: Allen Sebastian
- Production company: Team A Ventures
- Release date: 6 January 2023
- Country: India
- Language: Tamil

Vindhya Victim Verdict V3 is a 2023 Indian Tamil-language film directed by P. Amudhavanan and starring Varalaxmi Sarathkumar, Paavana Gowda, Esther Anil and Aadukalam Naren. It was released on 6 January 2023.

== Plot ==
V3 is a fight for their rights and against an injustice on a gang rape-murder and encountered case, achieving a poetic justice with the help of the system which fails initially on due to the undue pressure of representatives and thy people

== Cast ==
- Varalaxmi Sarathkumar as Sivagami
- Paavana Gowda as Vindhya
- Esther Anil as Viji
- Aadukalam Naren as Velayudham, Vindhya and Viji's father
- Visarnai Kathai Asiriyar Chandra Kumar
- Ponmudi
- Jai Kumar
- Sheeba

== Production ==
Varalaxmi shot for the film in 2022 and collaborated with director Amudhavanan, who had earlier made the film Quota (2020).

== Reception ==
The film was released on 6 January 2023 across Tamil Nadu. A reviewer from Dina Thanthi gave the film a mixed review. Logesh Balachandran from The Times of India gave 2/5 stars and wrote that "While there are a few intriguing moments, the narrative is tad slow and the emotional sequences fail to hit us hard enough". A reviewer from Maalai Malar gave a mixed review.

== Accolades ==
After the film's release, the makers registered the film across a number of international festivals. The film notably won the Best Feature Film award at the Toronto Tamil International Film Festival, Canada. The film has also won the Best Feature Film Mention Award at the 9th International Film Festival 2023 at Shimla.

Awards
Festivals	Awards	Ref.
7th Indian World Film Festival 2023	Best Film	
7th Indian World Film Festival 2023	Best Actress	
New Delhi Film Festival 2023	Best Feature Film	
Toronto Tamil international film festival 2023	The Best Director	
9th International Film Festival Shimla 2023	Best Feature Film	
