= Rahul Sipligunj =

Indian Playback singer and Pop artist

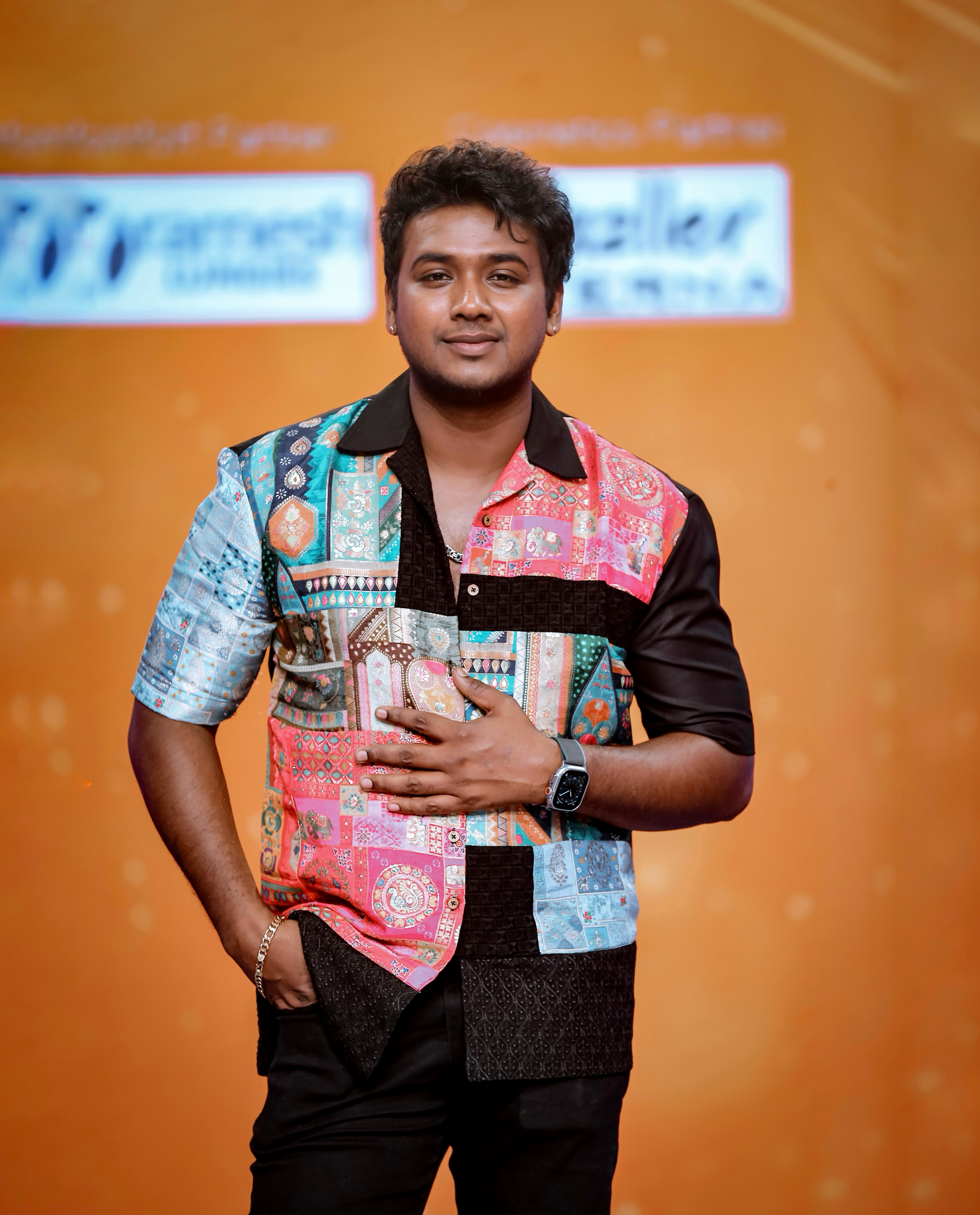

Background information
- Born: 22 August 1989 (age 37); Hyderabad, Andhra Pradesh, India (now in Telangana, India)
- Genres: Rapping, Hip hop music, Indie music, Ghazal
- Occupations: Playback singer; Independent musician; Actor
- Instruments: Vocals, Saxophone
- Years active: 2009–present
- Labels: Mango Music; Aditya Music

Rahul Sipligunj (born 22 August 1989) is an Indian playback singer and songwriter working predominantly in Telugu cinema. He became popular with his independent songs on YouTube.

The Government of Telangana announced a cash reward of Rs.1 crore to Rahul Sipligunj who got international recognition with the Oscar award winning song 'Naatu Naatu' in RRR on 20 July 2025.

== Personal life ==
Rahul Sipligunj got engaged to Harinya Reddy on 17 August 2025.

== Career ==
=== As independent artist ===
He started his career with online music videos on YouTube. He co-produced, wrote and sang songs like "Magajaathi", "Em Maayaloo", "Mangamma", "Makikirikiri", "Poor boy", "Daawath", "Galli Ka Ganesh", "Doorame", "Jai Bajrang", "Hijra". Most of his music videos were hits but among these videos, "Makikirikiri" & "Galli ka Ganesh" were Huge hits songs.

=== Tollywood ===
His first song was "College bulloda" in the movie Josh at the age of 20 in 2009. He became popular in Tollywood with his songs like "Vaastu Bagunde" in Dammu, "Singareni Undi" in Racha. He also sang Spanish part in the song "Melikalu" in Cameraman Gangatho Rambabu, "Prema Katha Chitram Title song" in Prema Katha Chitram, "You are My Darlingo" in Jakkana, "O Alekhya O Alekhya" in Doosukeltha, "Peddha Puli" in Chal Mohan Ranga. He sang the most popular song "Ranga Ranga Rangasthalana" from the movie Rangasthalam. He sang another popular song "Bonalu" from the movie iSmart Shankar.

He is best known for his work with M.M. Keeravani on the soundtrack for the 2022 film RRR. Sipligunj and Kaala Bhairava performed the Oscar-winning song "Naatu Naatu" at the 95th Academy Awards in March 2023. He was nominated for SIIMA Award for Best Male Playback Singer – Telugu for the song.

== Television ==
Year	Show	Role	Notes
2019	Bigg Boss 3	Contestant	Winner
2019	Alitho Saradaga	Guest	Talk Show
2020	2020 Anukunnadi Okati Ayinadi Okati	Guest	Reality show
2020	Sa Re Ga Ma Pa The Next Singing ICON	Guest	Reality music show
2021	BB Utsavam	Guest	TVshow
2023	Super Singer 3 (Telugu)	Judge	One of the judge along with Shweta Mohan, Mangli & Anantha Sriram

== Filmography ==
Year	Film	Role	Notes
2019	Rama Chakkani Seetha	Gulabi Puvvu Govind	Cameo appearance
2020	Pressure Cooker	Himself	Also composer for 2 songs Cameo appearance in the song "America Poyi Nuvaitvra Langa"
2023	Rangamarthanda	Rahul	Debut in a Lead role

== Discography ==
=== Non-film songs ===
==== Music videos ====
Year	Music Video
2013	"Magajaathi"
2013	"Enduke"
2015	"Yenadi" (Tamil)
2015	"Mangamma"
2015	"Em Maayalo"
2015	"Maisamma"
2015	"Maikam"
2016	"Poor Boy"
2016	"Poinava"
2016	"Maakikirikiri"
2016	"Doorame"
2016	"Galli Ka Ganesh"
2016	"Daawath"
2016	"Jai Bola Yellama Thalliki"
2018	"Jai Bajrang"
2018	"Kopam"
2019	"Hey Pilla"
2019	"O Naa Rahulaa"
2019	"Hijra"
2020	"Salute to Doctors and Police"
2020	"Baby"
2021	"Nuvvevare Ft. Rahul Sipligunj & Ashu Reddy"
2021	"Rahul Sipligunj's Chichhaa's ka Ganesh"
2022	"GANAPATHI ROOPA NAAMA - Rahul Sipligunj"
2023	"Rahul Sipligunj - NEE AYYA NAA MAMA"

==== Singles ====
Year	Single	Co-Artist(s)	Language	Ref.
2021	"Ladi Ladi"	Priya Prakash Varrier (co-singer); Sricharan Pakala (composer)	Telugu	

=== Film songs ===
Year	Film	Song	Composer(s)	Language
2009	Dheera	"Neeli Mabbu Medaloni"	Yuvan Shankar Raja	Telugu
2009	Josh	"College Bulloda"	Sandeep Chowta	Telugu
2009	Snehituda	"Righto Wrongo"	Shiva Ram Shankar	Telugu
2012	Dammu	"Vaastu Bagunde" "Dhammu Title Song"	M. M. Keeravaani	Telugu
2012	Eega; Makkhi	"Eega Eega Eega" "Naam Apun Ka Jani"	M. M. Keeravaani	Telugu
2012	Racha	"Singareni Undhi"	Mani Sharma	Telugu
2012	Cameraman Gangatho Rambabu	"Melikalu"	Mani Sharma	Telugu
2012	Krishnam Vande Jagadgurum	"Sai Andri Nanu"	Mani Sharma	Telugu
2012	Sudigadu	"Inki Pinki Ponky"	Sri Vasanth	Telugu
2012	Shirdi Sai	"Vasthunna Baba"	M. M. Keeravaani	Telugu
2013	Mahesh	"Mahesh Yevvado"	Gopi Sunder	Telugu
2013	Premantene Chitram	"Orugallu Pellilo"	M. G. K. Praveen	Telugu
2013	Prema Katha Chitram	"Prema Katha Chitramidhi" "Prema Katha Chitram Dance Bit"	J.B.	Telugu
2014	Gayakudu	"Oh Oh Oh Premapata"	Roshan Saluri	Telugu
2014	Kotha Janta	"Kallalloki Kallupettestu"	J.B.	Telugu
2014	Lovers	"Happy Happy"	J.B.	Telugu
2014	Hrudaya Kaleyam	"Naku Shivarathri"	RK	Telugu
2015	Lion	"One & Only Lion"	Mani Sharma	Telugu
2015	Akhil	"Zara Zara Navvaradhe"	Anup Rubens; Thaman S	Telugu
2015	Doosukeltha	"Modatti Saari" "Soodimande"	Mani Sharma	Telugu
2015	Lava Kusa (2015 film)	"Mere Dil Aaj Kal"	Ram Narayan	Telugu
2016	Rojulu Marayi	"Vasthunna O Nestham"	J.B.	Telugu
2016	Kotha Kothaga Vunnadi	"Okkasariga"	Vamsi	Telugu
2016	Shourya	"O Manasa"	K. Vedaa	Telugu
2016	Jakkanna	"You are My Darlingo"	Dinesh	Telugu
2016	Speedunnodu	"Yellow Yellow Dirty Fellow"	Sri Vasanth	Telugu
2017	Lie	"Bombhaat"	Mani Sharma	Telugu
2017	Nenorakam	"Naa Cheli Yedhi"	Mahit Narayan	Telugu
2017	Sankarabharanam	"Banno Rani"	Praveen Tommy	Telugu
2017	Seetha Ramuni Kosam	"Edho Teliyani Bandham"	Anil Gopi Reddy	Telugu
2017	Aaradugula Bullet	"Chinnappude"	Mani Sharma	Telugu
2018	Gang	"Chitike"	Anirudh Ravichander	Telugu
2018	Chalo	"Drunk & Drive"	Mahati Swara Sagar	Telugu
2018	Rangasthalam	"Ranga Ranga Rangasthalaana"	Devi Sri Prasad	Telugu
2018	MLA	"Hey Indu"	Mani Sharma	Telugu
2018	Chal Mohan Ranga	"Pedda Puli"	Thaman S	Telugu
2018	Naa Peru Surya	"Iraga Iraga"	Vishal–Shekhar	Telugu
2018	RX 100	"Nippai Ragile"	Chaitan Bharadwaj	Telugu
2018	Husharu	"Naatu Naatu"	Radhan	Telugu
2018	Bangari Balaraju	"Emi Kalluro Mama"	Chinni Krishna; Chitti Babu Reddy	Telugu
2018	Shambo Shankara	"Amma Ammoru"	Sai Kartheek	Telugu
2018	Brand Babu	"Andala Blackberry"	J.B.	Telugu
2018	Orange	"Orangeu Orangeu"	Thaman S	Kannada
2018	Savyasachi	"1980,81,82"	M. M. Keeravaani	Telugu
2018	Petta	"Aaha Kalayanam"	Anirudh Ravichander	Telugu
2018	Petta	"Yeh Shaadiyana"	Anirudh Ravichander	Hindi
2018	Prema Janta	"Ninna Monna"	Nikhilesh Thogari	Telugu
2018	Silly Fellows	"Pilla Nee Buggalu"	Sri Vasanth	Telugu
2018	Juvva	"Anukoledhe"	M. M. Keeravaani	Telugu
2018	Padi Padi Leche Manasu	"Urike Cheli Chilaka"	Vishal Chandrasekhar	Telugu
2018	F2	"Ding Dong"	Devi Sri Prasad	Telugu
2019	Prema Katha Chitram 2	"Merupula Merisina"	Jeevan Babu	Telugu
2019	Chitralahari	"Glassmates"	Devi Sri Prasad	Telugu
2019	Kanchana 3	"Snehithudiki Kovela Kattu" "Black And White Raja"	Thaman S	Telugu
2019	Maharshi	"Paala Pitta"	Devi Sri Prasad	Telugu
2019	ABCD – American Born Confused Desi	"Celebrity"	Judah Sandhy	Telugu
2019	Falaknuma Das	"Paye Paye"	Vivek Sagar	Telugu
2019	Mallesham	"Oho Jambiya"	Mark K. Robin	Telugu
2019	iSmart Shankar	"Bonalu"	Mani Sharma	Telugu
2019	Kousalya Krishnamurthy	"Raakasi Gadusu Pilla"	Dhibu Ninan Thomas	Telugu
2019	Seemaraja	"Paraak Paraak"	D. Imman	Telugu
2019	Rama Chakkani Seetha	"Howle Pilla"	Kesava Kiran	Telugu
2019	Prema Antha Easy Kadu	"O Prema Agavey"	M.Jai	Telugu
2019	Pressure Cooker	"Nuvvaitavra Langa"	Rahul Sipligunj	Telugu
2019	90ML	"Yinipinchukoru" "Singilu Singilu"	Anup Rubens	Telugu
2019	Prati Roju Pandage	"Thakita Thakita"	Thaman S	Telugu
2019	Bhagyanagara Veedullo Gamattu	"Prema Rojuke Banthi"	K. Saketh	Telugu
2020	Ala Vaikunthapurramuloo	"OMG Daddy"	Thaman S	Telugu
2020	Ala Vaikunthapurramuloo	"OMG Daddy"	Thaman S	Hindi
2020	Entha Manchivaadavuraa	"Jaataro Jaatara"	Gopi Sunder	Telugu
2020	Savaari	"Nee Kannulu"	Shekar Chandra	Telugu
2020	Pressure Cooker	"Saami Lingo"	Rahul Sipligunj	Telugu
2020	Tagite Tandana	"Boss Maama"	Sai	Telugu
2020	A1 Express	"Single Kingulam"	Hiphop Tamizha	Telugu
2020	Orey Bujjiga	"Krishnaveni"	Anup Rubens	Telugu
2021	Maro Prema Katha	"Nallani Kaatuka"	Mark Prashanth	Telugu
2021	Lingoccha	"Brother Sister Mother Father"	Because Raj	Telugu
2021	Kanabadutaledu	"Premey Ledhu"	Madhu Ponnas	Telugu
2021	Sulthan	"Jai Sulthan"	Vivek–Mervin	Telugu
2021	Konda Polam	"Dham Dham Dham"	M. M. Keeravani	Telugu
2021	RRR	"Naatu Naatu" (Telugu)	M. M. Keeravani	Telugu
2021	RRR	"Haali Naatu" (Kannada)	M. M. Keeravani	Kannada
2021	RRR	"Naatu Koothu" (Tamil)	M. M. Keeravani	Tamil
2021	RRR	"Naacho Naacho" (Hindi)	M. M. Keeravani	Hindi
2022	Acharya	"Bhale Bhale Banjara"	Mani Sharma	Telugu
2022	Kanmani Rambo Khatija	"Dippam Dappam"	Anirudh Ravichander	Telugu
2022	F3	"Life Ante Itta Vundaala"	Devi Sri Prasad	Telugu
2022	Macherla Niyojakavargam	"Pori Superoo"	Mahati Swara Sagar	Telugu
2023	Suryapet Junction	"Mere Yaaraa"	Roshan Saluri	Telugu
2023	Bubblegum	"Habibi Jilebi"	Sricharan Pakala	Telugu
2024	Bhoothaddam Bhaskar Narayana	"Kaka"	Vijai Bulganin	Telugu
2024	Guntur Kaaram	"Mawaa Enthaina"	S. Thaman	Telugu
2024	Music Shop Murthy	"Angrezi Beat"	Pavan	Telugu
2024	Roti Kapda Romance	"Galeez"	Harshavardhan Rameshwar	Telugu
2024	Uruku Patela	"Patnam Pilla"	Pravin Lakkaraju	Telugu
2024	Jithender Reddy	"A aa E ee U uu"	Gopi Sundar	Telugu
2024	Gandhi Tatha Chettu	"Dhagad Pilla"	Ree	Telugu
2024	Srikakulam Sherlock Holmes	"Preminchane Pilla"	Sunil Kashyap	Telugu
2025	Racharikam	"Maula Maula"	Vengi	Telugu
2025	Hari Hara Veera Mallu: Part 1	"Kollagottinadhiro"	M. M. Keeravani	Telugu
2025	Hari Hara Veera Mallu: Part 1	"Udaa Ke Le Gayi"	M. M. Keeravani	Hindi
2025	Hari Hara Veera Mallu: Part 1	"Emmanasa Parichutta"	M. M. Keeravani	Tamil
2025	Hari Hara Veera Mallu: Part 1	"Kaddhukondu Hodhalo"	M. M. Keeravani	Kannada
2025	Oka Brundavanam	"Inthinthai Saagene"	Sunny–Saketh	Telugu
2025	Solo Boy	"Solo Boy Title Song"	Judah Sandhy	Telugu
2025	Single	"Sirrakaindhi Single Bathuku"	Vishal Chandrashekhar	Telugu
2025	Bakasura Restaurant	"Ayyo Emira Ee Jeevitham"	Vikas Badisa	Telugu
2025	Mithra Mandali	"Kattanduko Janaki"	RR Dhruvan	Telugu
