= Kapati =

Indian Kannada-language suspense thriller film

- Theatrical release poster
- Directed by: Ravikiran D; Chethan SP
- Produced by: Dayal Padmanabhan
- Starring: Sukrutha Wagle; Dev Devaiah; Sathvik Krishnan
- Cinematography: Vikram Yoganand; Sathish Rajendran
- Music by: Johan shevanesh
- Production company: D-pictures
- Release date: 7 March 2025
- Country: India
- Language: Kannada

Kapati (transl. Fraud / Deceiver) is a 2025 Indian Kannada-language suspense thriller film directed by debutant Ravikiran D and Chethan SP. It was produced by Dayal Padmanabhan under D-pictures. Sukrutha Wagle and Dev Devaiah play the lead roles, while Sathvik Krishnan plays the antagonist. The music is composed by Johan Shevanesh, while cinematography and editing were handled by Sathish Rajendran and Vikram Yoganand.

== Plot ==
Priya is fighting sadness in her family's home while odd things start happening all around her. Priya has no idea that her battle is in line with the evil powers of the dark web. A pair of aspirational boys, Suman and Chakri, take advantage of the shadowy corners of the internet to amass fortune. Suman and Chakri's quest for wealth simultaneously takes a sinister turn. Suman uses more subdued techniques, but Chakri resorts to brutality in order to increase revenues.

Ethical boundaries become hazy as Priya's life collides with the lads' growing dangers on the dark web, and repercussions follow. Suman struggles with morals, while Priya's safety is put in danger by Chakri's avarice.

== Cast ==
- Sukrutha Wagle as Priya
- Dev Devaiah as Suman
- Sathvik Krishnan as Chakri
- Shakar Narayan as Priyas father
- Zeeshan as Priya's Brother
- Pavan Venugopal as Doctor
- Nanda Gopal as Rowdy
- Phani Kumar as Priya's Fiancé

== Production ==
The film was scripted in 2023, KAPATI initially began production under 16MM Stories, founded by Chethan SP and Ravikiran. However, after a few days of shooting, the project was taken over by D Pictures, a production house renowned for its critically acclaimed and award-winning films. Under the leadership of Dayal Padmanabhan, a visionary filmmaker with a remarkable portfolio, the film evolved into a gripping psychological thriller that pushes creative boundaries.

The casting process began with Sukrutha Wagle, who was the first choice for the lead role. After her onboarding, the team identified the exceptionally talented Dev and Satvik to complete the ensemble.

Filming wrapped up in mid-2024, with an initial plan for a late 2024 release. However, to ensure a more impactful launch, the team decided to release KAPATI on 7 March 2025—promising an unforgettable cinematic experience for audiences

== Release ==
Kapati was released across the Karnataka state on 7 March 2025. The movie was screened both in the multiplex and single screen theatres. With positive critic reviews and public response, the movie went on to become one of the decent hits of the year 2025.

== Reception ==
Y. Maheswara Reddy of Bangalore Mirror rated the film three out of five stars and stated that "It is worth a watch for those who enjoy psychological thrill and movies that explore new themes such as the darknet." Sridevi S. of The Times of India gave three out of five stars, stating that "Kapati is a film that gives us a reality check about how technology has progressed in both good and bad ways, and also how it is fuelling psychotic behaviour among people with mental health disorders. Kapati falls under the info-tainer genre that comes attached with thriller elements. It is indeed a fresh concept in the Kannada film industry, and is recommended to be watched in theatres."

Times Now appreciated citing "Kapati explores this shadowy digital world without overwhelming the audience with jargon. More than just a lesson on the Darknet, the film delivers an engaging experience" The Indian Express reviewed "If you think the internet is just a tool, think again. Kapati ensures you never look at your screen the same way again".
