= P. Amudhavanan =

Indian film director

- Born: P. Amudhavanan; Tamil Nadu, India
- Occupation: Film director
- Years active: 2017–present
- Spouse: Sridevi

P. Amudhavanan is an Indian film director who has directed Tamil language films. He made his debut with Veruli (2017), before working on other ventures including Quota (2020) and Vindhya Victim Verdict V3 (2023).

== Career ==
Amudhavanan worked with Tata Motors in Chennai, before quitting his job to make his directorial debut through Veruli (2017). The film dealt with how potholes double as death traps. He began work on the film in 2016 and cast reality show singing contestant Syed Subahan to play a leading role in the film alongside K. Bhagyaraj, Abhishek Vinod and Ravi Prakash. During the release of the film, Amudhavanan remarked that he had hoped the film would bring back Coimbatore as a film-making city in India.

He later worked on Quota (2020), which received 72 international film awards during its run at global film festivals. Prior to the film's theatrical release, it was promoted as the first Indian film to focus on gymnastics. In 2023, his crime thriller film Vindhya Victim Verdict V3 (2023) starring Varalaxmi Sarathkumar was released.

Amudhavanan has formed a production house named as Team A Ventures.

== Filmography ==
Year	Film	Notes	Ref		
Year	Film	Notes	Ref	2017	Veruli
2020	Quota	Also cinematographer			
2023	Vindhya Victim Verdict V3				
