= Kombu (film) =

2020 Indian Tamil-language horror comedy film

- Directed by: E Ibrahim
- Written by: E Ibrahim
- Produced by: M. Panneer Selvam; P. Vanathi
- Starring: Lollu Sabha Jeeva; Disha Pandey; Ganja Karuppu; Swaminathan; Pandiarajan; Nellai Siva; Ambani Shankar; Puvisha Manoharan
- Cinematography: Sudeep Fredrick
- Edited by: Greyson
- Music by: Devguru
- Production company: Sai Srinivasa Pictures
- Release date: 11 December 2020
- Country: India
- Language: Tamil

Kombu (lit. 'Horn') is a 2020 Indian Tamil-language horror comedy film, written and directed by E Ibrahim. The film features Lollu Sabha Jeeva, Disha Pandey, Puvisha Manoharan, Pandiarajan, Ganja Karuppu, Swaminathan, Gayathri, Ambani Shankar, and Nellai Shiva. It was released on 11 December 2020.

== Plot ==
A student, who discovers that people are using cow horns to tackle ghosts and spirits in a village, which is when she decides to visit the area along with her colleagues. During their stay, they encounter supernatural events that relate to horns. What occurs next forms the crux of the story.

== Cast ==
- Lollu Sabha Jeeva as Karthick
- Disha Pandey as Janani
- Puvisha Manoharan as Princy
- Pandiarajan as Tata (Karthick's Uncle)
- Swaminathan as Pasupathi
- Ganja Karuppu
- Ambani Shankar
- Nellai Siva

== Soundtrack ==
Lyrics were written by E Ibrahim, Devguru, Krithika Gokulnath, Venkatesh Prabhakar

No.	Title	Singer(s)	Length
1.	"Arugilae Nindru Kolgirai"	Saindhavi, Santosh Hariharan	4:21
2.	"Scooby Dooby Doo"	Arunraja Kamaraj, Devguru	4:31
3.	"Kanave Azhagae"	Devguru	3:08
4.	"Tightu Macaan"	Saindhavi, Velmurugan	4:44
Total length:			16:44
