= Racha (soundtrack) =

- Album cover

Soundtrack album by Mani Sharma
- Released: 20 February 2012
- Recorded: 2011–2012
- Genre: Feature film soundtrack
- Length: 23:00
- Language: Telugu
- Label: Aditya Music
- Producer: Mani Sharma

Mani Sharma chronology
Solo (2011)	Racha (2012)	Ramachari (2012)

Racha is the feature film soundtrack of the 2012 Telugu action comedy of the same name. Mani Sharma composed the soundtrack. It consists of 5 songs written by Chandrabose, Suddala Ashok Teja, Ramajogayya Sastry, Bhuvanachandra and Chinni Charan.

== Development ==
Mani Sharma composed the film's soundtrack and background music marking his first collaboration with Sampath Nandi and second with Ram Charan after Chirutha (2007). By mid July 2011, Mani Sharma completed composing 2 songs. The song Vaana Vaana Velluvaye from the film Gang Leader was remixed for this film.

The official track list unveiled in early March 2012 featured 5 songs in total including the title track and the remixed version of Vaana Vaana Velluvaye. The lyrics for the Telugu version were penned by Chandrabose, Suddala Ashok Teja, Ramajogayya Sastry, Bhuvanachandra and Chinni Charan. Vivega, Arivumathi and A. R. P. Jayaram penned the lyrics for the Tamil dubbed version Ragalai.

== Track listing ==
Telugu
No.	Title	Lyrics	Artist(s)	Length
1.	"Racha"	Chandrabose	Deepu, Sravana Bhargavi (Chorus)	4:54
2.	"Vaana Vaana (Remix)"	Bhuvanachandra	Rahul Nambiar, Chaitra	4:48
3.	"Dillaku Dillaku"	Chinni Charan	Tippu, Geeta Madhuri	4:35
4.	"Oka Padam"	Chandrabose	Hemachandra, Malavika	4:36
5.	"Singareni Undi"	Suddala Ashok Teja	Rahul Sipligunj (Uncredited), Sukhwinder Singh (Chorus), Narendra, Sahiti	4:07
Total length:				23:00

Tamil
No.	Title	Lyrics	Artist(s)	Length
1.	"Ragalai Ragalai"	Viveka	Ranjith, Rita	4:54
2.	"Unnai Paadam"	Arivumathi	Hemachandra, Saindhavi	4:34
3.	"Vada Vada Vellai Poove"	Arivumathi	Haricharan, Janani	3:57
4.	"Muyalaa Muyalaa"	A. R. P. Jayaram	Tippu, Saindhavi	4:37
5.	"Neyveli Inga"	A. R. P. Jayaram	Mukesh Mohamed, Kalpana Raghavendar	4:07
Total length:				22:09

== Release ==
After considering Tirupathi, the makers opted to host a promotional event to launch the soundtrack at Kurnool on 15 January 2012 on the eve of Sankranthi. Later it was postponed to 5 February 2012. Chiranjeevi and Shankar were expected to attend the audio launch as chief guests. The event was cancelled in the last minute as the makers felt that the students would be disturbed as examinations were approaching. The venue was shifted to Hyderabad.

It was confirmed later that the soundtrack would be launched on the evening of 20 February 2012, coinciding with Maha Shivratri at People's Plaza near Necklace Road, Hyderabad among fanfare and grand arrangements were made. Chiranjeevi and Pawan Kalyan were confirmed as the chief guests. However the latter did not attend the launch because of his stay in USA for post production works of his films. The event was hosted by Suma Kanakala. The first three songs were released by V. V. Vinayak, Allu Arjun and B. V. S. N. Prasad. S. S. Rajamouli unveiled the trailers, V. V. Vinayak unveiled the CDs and the memory card was released by Chiranjeevi. The soundtrack of the Tamil version Ragalai was released on 18 March 2012.

=== Marketing ===
Ram Charan opined that the success of the soundtrack of his previous film Orange may influence the price of the audio rights of this film. The title song Racha was leaked into the internet accidentally and went viral though few opined that it was deliberately leaked as a part of the film's promotion. The audio rights were then sold to Aditya Music for an amount of ₹10 million (US$110,000) which was one of the highest prices for a Telugu film soundtrack. Stunts by Bir Khalsa group known for their breathtaking performance in the reality show Adhurs was planned at the audio launch event.

=== Reception ===
Racha's soundtrack received mixed reviews. Musicperk.com wrote "Mani Sharma made this album a simple one. The melody king had delivered only one song of his stamp. The success of the whole album now depends upon its visualisation to reach into the core of audience. However, it is just a good album overall. Three songs are almost a mass beat, one is a remix and only one melody by the melody king- Mani Sharma" and rated the album 7.5 out of 10. IndiaGlitz stated "Racha is quite an unlikely album from Mani Sharma. He revs up the album with massy tunes, but does the big one live up to the hype? Not so much, especially if you compare the musician's previous work for Charan. All the same, this five-song album is enjoyable for its mix of folksy beats and a hummable song" and added "Chandrabose, Bhuvanachandra, Suddala Ashok Teja lend their lyrical touch, not letting you down in any song, while the voices although routine, engage you with their youthfulness".

Raagalahari.com wrote "Final verdict is simple, ‘Racha’ having full album with wonderful and energetic songs is an instant hit". way2movies.com wrote "Mani Sharma scored a mediocre album playing it safe with fast beat mass numbers. The title track of the film is too good while the Vana Vana remix is a huge disappointment. Dillaku, Singareni undi are highly energetic mass numbers though routine kind. All in all, Mani Sharma has gone routine".
