= Jackson (2015 film) =

2015 film

- Directed by: D. Sanath Kumar
- Screenplay by: D Sanath Kumar
- Story by: Gokul
- Produced by: Sundar P. Gowda; Anil
- Starring: Duniya Vijay; Paavana Gowda
- Cinematography: Selvam
- Edited by: Suresh S. A.
- Music by: Arjun Janya
- Production companies: KPS Combines; Duniya Talkies
- Distributed by: Bahar Films
- Release date: 15 January 2015
- Running time: 143 minutes
- Country: India
- Language: Kannada

Jackson is a 2015 Indian Kannada romantic comedy film directed by Sanath Kumar, a former editor who worked mostly with director Yogaraj Bhat, making his directorial debut. The film stars Duniya Vijay, Paavana Gowda along with Rangayana Raghu. The film is an official remake of the Tamil blockbuster film Idharkuthane Aasaipattai Balakumara (2013) which was directed by Gokul. The film opened on the screens on 15 January 2015.

== Cast ==
- Duniya Vijay as Jackson
- Paavana Gowda as Kumudha
- Rangayana Raghu
- Abhiram
- Deepa Bhaskar
- Bullet Prakash
- Aishwarya Sindogi
- Nagendra Shah
- Satyajith
- Deepa
- Kote Prabhakar
- Rajinikant S as Sapota

== Soundtrack ==
Music composer Arjun Janya was finally roped in to score for both score and soundtrack after names such as Veer Samarth were doing rounds during the launch of the film. One track composed by Veer Samarth was retained in the final track list. The lyrics are written by Yogaraj Bhat and Chethan Kumar.

Jackson

Soundtrack album by Arjun Janya
- Released: October 2014
- Genre: Feature film soundtrack
- Label: Anand Audio

No.	Title	Lyrics	Singer(s)	Length
1.	"Avnu Micheal Jacksonu"	Yogaraj Bhat	Arjun Janya
2.	"Opposite House Kumudha"	Chethan Kumar	Arjun Janya
3.	"Godu Kelu Godu"	Chethan Kumar	Naveen Sajju
4.	"Endendigu Naguthiru" (composed by Veer Samarth)	Chethan Gandharva	Chethan Kumar

== Reception ==
=== Critical response ===
GS Kumar of The Times of India scored the film at 2.5 out of 5 stars and says "Vijay’s performance may impress only his fans. Aishwarya, who makes her presence felt as a romantic interest in a sub-plot in the movie, is better than Vrinda Pavana. Rangayana Raghu’s comic act brings some liveliness. Deepa, the dubbing artiste, outshines all with a captivating performance. Music by Arjun Janya is good." Shyam Prasad S of Bangalore Mirror scored the film at 2.5 out of 5 stars and says "Vijay's stunt sequences are a saving grace. The cinematography and art work are other aspects of the film that rise above the average."
