= Disha Pandey =

Indian actress

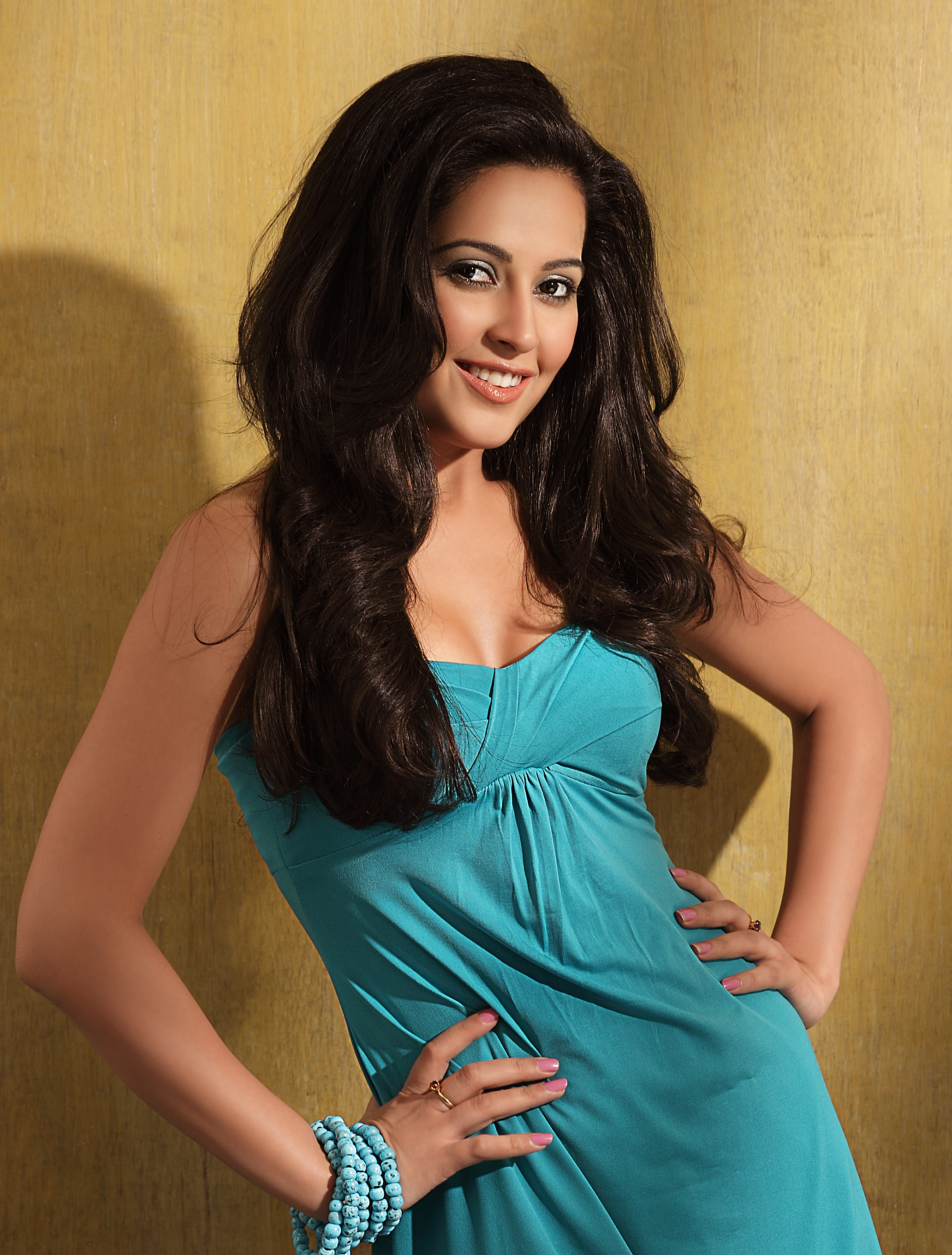
- Born: 17 January (Note: The year of her birth has not been reported by a reliable source.)
- Occupation: Actress
- Years active: 2009–present

Disha Pandey (born 17 January) is an Indian actress. She has appeared in films in Tamil, notably in the commercial success, Tamizh Padam (2010), and in Telugu, Kannada and Hindi.

== Early life ==
In comments published in a 2011 article in The New Indian Express, Pandey shared that her father was a gazette officer with the education department, and that her mother worked with Hindustan Copper. She also revealed that she has one older sister and a younger brother.

Pandey was in class 12 when she entered films, but was advised to pursue her degree before continuing acting. Despite choosing biology with mathematics in class 12, Disha decided to pursue arts to be able to complete her degree more easily. In 2011, she reported that she completed her first year BA in Human Rights.

== Career ==
Pandey has done modelling for commercials, including for Prince Jewellery and Amul Lassi.

Pandey achieved initial success as an actress in the successful comedy film Tamizh Padam (2010).

She acted in Mayanginen Thayanginen (2012), a Tamil flick opposite Nitin Sathya and Moksha (2013), a Telugu horror film, directed by Srikanth Vemulapalli. In Mayanginen Thayanginen she played the character of a very homely girl — a customer care executive employed with a call taxi company.

She made her Kannada debut in Jai Lalitha (2014), the Kannada remake of the Malayalam hit Mayamohini (2012). She plays the role that Malayalam actress Mythili played in the original. She has appeared in another Kannada films Bombay Mittai (2015), in which she plays a character interested in travelling and photography.

== Filmography ==
List of Disha Pandey film credits
Year	Title	Role	Language	Notes	Ref.
2009	Bolo Raam	Juhi Khan	Hindi	Hindi debut	
2010	Tamizh Padam	Priya	Tamil	Tamil debut	
2012	Mayanginen Thayanginen	Shruthi	Tamil		
2013	Race	Aarthi	Telugu	Telugu debut	
2013	Saare Jahaan Se Mehnga	Suman	Hindi		
2013	Keeripulla	Sandhya	Tamil		
2013	Moksha	Disha	Telugu		
2013	Chikki Mukki	Sangeetha	Tamil		
2014	Jai Lalitha	Disha	Kannada	Kannada debut	
2014	Manasunu Maaya Seyake	Lasya	Telugu		
2015	Bombay Mittai	Aditi	Kannada		
2016	CTRL-C	Disha	Telugu		
2018	Tamizh Padam 2	Priya	Tamil	Cameo	
2019	Adyaksha in America	Simran	Kannada		
2020	Kombu	Janani	Tamil		
