= Sowmya Sharma =

Telugu dubbing artist, RJ and script writer

- Occupations: Dubbing artist RJ; Script Writer
- Years active: 2005–present
- Spouse: Anand Ranga

Sowmya Sharma is an Indian voice actor, RJ, and a script writer who works in Telugu films. She has lent her voice for leading actresses of Telugu cinema including Anushka Shetty, Kajal Aggarwal, Nayanthara, and Shruthi Haasan among others. Her work in Baahubali: The Beginning (2015) and Baahubali 2: The Conclusion (2017) earned her Nandi Award for Best Female Dubbing Artist by the Government of Andhra Pradesh.

== Personal life ==
Sowmya is married to Telugu film director Anand Ranga and lives in Hyderabad.

== Career ==
Over the years, Sowmya has done many hats in her career. She worked as an RJ, dubbing artist and currently working as a scriptwriter for OK Jaanu, America Ammayi and Chhota Bheem.

=== As dubbing artist ===
Over her career as a dubbing artist, she dubbed for over 500 films and was awarded the highest award ceremony for excellence in Telugu cinema, Nandi Awards, twice. She received the first Nandi award for Lakshyam, where she lent her voice for Anushka Shetty and the second one was for the movie Mahatma in which she gave voice over for the actresses Bhavana.

== Filmography ==
=== As a voice over artist ===
Year	Work	Language	Dubbing for	Notes
2025	Hari Hara Veera Mallu	Telugu	Nidhhi Agerwal	
2023	Miss Shetty Mr Polishetty	Telugu	Anushka Shetty	
2023	Veera Simha Reddy	Telugu	Honey Rose	
2022	Parampara	Telugu	Aakanksha Singh	Disney+ Hotstar web series
2021	Aaradugula Bullet	Telugu	Nayanthara	
2018	2.0	Telugu Dubbed	Amy Jackson	
2018	Kavacham	Telugu	Kajal Aggarwal	
2018	Saakshyam	Telugu	Pooja Hegde	
2018	Bhaagamathie	Telugu	Anushka Shetty	
2017	Baahubali 2: The Conclusion	Telugu	Anushka Shetty	
2017	Yamudu 3	Telugu (Dubbed version)	Anushka Shetty	
2017	Khaidi No. 150	Telugu	Kajal Aggarwal	
2016	Sardaar Gabbar Singh	Telugu	Kajal Aggarwal	
2015	Bajirao Mastani	Telugu (Dubbed version)	Deepika Padukone	
2015	Prem Ratan Dhan Payo	Telugu (Dubbed version)	Sonam Kapoor	
2015	Maari	Telugu (Dubbed version)	Kajal Agarwal	
2015	Rudhramadevi	Telugu	Anushka Shetty	
2015	Baahubali: The Beginning	Telugu	Anushka Shetty	
2015	Size Zero	Telugu	Anushka Shetty	
2014	Bang Bang!	Telugu (Dubbed version)	Katrina Kaif	
2014	Brother of Bommali	Telugu	Karthika Nair	
2014	Govindudu Andarivadele	Telugu	Kajal Aggarwal	
2014	Yevadu	Telugu	Kajal Aggarwal; Shruti Haasan	
2013	Varna	Telugu (Dubbed Version)	Anushka Shetty	
2013	Welcome Obama	Telugu	Urmila Kanitkar	
2013	Raja Rani	Telugu (Dubbed version)	Nayanthara	Telugu version only
2013	Mirchi	Telugu	Anushka Shetty	
2013	Yamudu 2	Telugu (Dubbed version)	Anushka Shetty	
2013	Iddarammayilatho	Telugu	Amala Paul	
2013	Naayak	Telugu	Kajal Aggarwal	
2013	Doosukeltha	Telugu	Lavanya Tripathi	
2013	Backbench Student	Telugu	Piaa Bajpai	
2013	Greeku Veerudu	Telugu	Nayanthara	
2012	Sarocharu	Telugu	Richa Gangopadhyay	
2012	Thuppaki	Telugu (Dubbed version)	Kajal Agarwal	
2012	Srimannarayana	Telugu	Parvati Melton	
2012	Nuvva Nena	Telugu	Shriya Saran	
2012	Denikaina Ready	Telugu	Hansika Motwani	
2012	Love Failure	Telugu	Amala Paul	
2012	3	Telugu (Dubbed version)	Shruti Hassan	
2012	Bodyguard (2012 film)	Telugu	Saloni Aswani	
2011	Teenmaar	Telugu	Trisha	
2011	Priyudu	Telugu	Preetika Rao	
2011	Mr.Perfect	Telugu	Kajal Agarwal	
2011	Oh My Friend	Telugu	Shruti Haasan	
2011	7th Sense	Telugu (Dubbed version)	Shruti Hassan	
2010	Ragada	Telugu	Anushka Shetty	
2010	Khaleja	Telugu	Anushka Shetty	
2010	Yamudu	Telugu (Dubbed version)	Anushka Shetty	
2010	Mouna Ragam	Telugu	Madhuurima	
2010	Rama Rama Krishna Krishna	Telugu	Priya Anand	
2010	Maryada Ramanna	Telugu	Saloni Aswani	
2010	Darling	Telugu	Kajal Aggarwal	
2010	Adhurs	Telugu	Nayanthara	
2009	Magadheera	Telugu	Kajal Aggarwal	
2009	Diary	Telugu	Shraddha Das	
2009	Drona	Telugu	Priyamani	
2009	Mahathma	Telugu	Bhavana	Nandi Award for Best Female Dubbing Artist
2009	Jayeebhava	Telugu	Hansika Motwani	
2009	Arundhati	Telugu	Anushka Shetty	Dubbed for present day's Anushka's character
2008	Pourudu	Telugu	Kajal Agarwal	
2008	Souryam	Telugu	Anushka Shetty	
2008	Chintakayala Ravi	Telugu	Mamta Mohandas	
2008	Aatadista	Telugu	Kajal Agarwal	
2007	Takkari	Telugu	Sadha	
2007	Nava Vasantham	Telugu	Ankitha	
2007	Anasuya	Telugu	Nikita Thukral	
2007	Yamadonga	Telugu	Mamta Mohandas; Priyamani	
2007	Deva (Dubbed version)	Telugu	Asin	
2007	Munna	Telugu	Ileana D'Cruz	
2007	Raju Bhai	Telugu	Sheela	
2007	Lakshyam	Telugu	Anushka Shetty	Nandi Award for Best Female Dubbing Artist
2007	Yogi	Telugu	Nayanthara	
2007	Athidhi	Telugu	Amrita Rao	
2007	Desamuduru	Telugu	Hansika Motwani	
2006	Rakhi	Telugu	Ileana D'Cruz	
2006	Bommarillu	Telugu	Neha Bamb	
2006	Vikramarkudu	Telugu	Anushka Shetty	
2006	Sri Ramadasu	Telugu	Veda Sastry	
2006	Lakshmi	Telugu	Nayanthara	
2005	Chatrapathi	Telugu	Shriya Saran; Aarthi Agarwal	
2005	Allari Pidugu	Telugu	Katrina Kaif	
2005	Super	Telugu	Ayesha Takia	

=== As a scriptwriter ===
Year	Show	Credit As	Language	Notes
2021	Anya's Tutorial	Writer	Telugu	
2017	OK Jaanu	Scriptwriter	Hindi	
2017	Super Bheem	Scriptwriter	Hindi	
2015	Mighty Raju	Scriptwriter	Hindi	
2015	America Ammayi	Scriptwriter	Telugu	
2014	Arjun – Prince of Bali	Scriptwriter	Hindi	
2014	Chhota Bheem	Scriptwriter	Hindi	
