= Jatta (film) =

- Theatrical release poster
- Directed by: B. M. Giriraj
- Written by: B. M. Giriraj
- Produced by: N. S. Rajkumar
- Starring: Kishore; Sukrutha Wagle
- Cinematography: Kiran Hampapur
- Edited by: K. M. Prakash
- Music by: Ashley Mendonca and Abhilash Lakra
- Distributed by: Omkar Movies
- Release date: 11 October 2013
- Running time: 134 minutes
- Country: India
- Language: Kannada

Jatta (Kannada: ಜಟ್ಟ) is a 2013 Indian Kannada-language thriller drama film directed by B. M. Giriraj. It stars Kishore and Sukrutha Wagle in lead roles. Kishore plays the role of a forest guard whose wife elopes with a tourist and he becomes involved in a clash of beliefs and ideologies with a feminist who he chains in his isolated forest home. The film won critical acclaim for its story and the portrayal of characters from critics and filmgoers.

== Cast ==
- Kishore as Jatta
- Sukrutha Wagle as Sagarika
- Paavana Gowda as Belli
- Prem Kumar as Bheemakumar
- B. Suresha
- Vinod Kumbar as Rajesh

== Production ==
In 2010, B. M. Giriraj made an experimental film Naviladavaru with a budget of ₹35,000. Being recognized for this, he was offered to direct Advaita by film producer N. M. Suresh in the same year, a film that did not release. He was then offered Jatta by producer N. S. Rajkumar.

== Soundtrack ==
The music of the film was composed by the duo Ashley Mendonca and Abhilash Lakra with lyrics penned by B. M. Giriraj.

Jatta

Soundtrack album to Jatta by Ashley Mendonca and Abhilash Lakra
- Released: 2013
- Language: Kannada

=== Track list ===
No.	Title	Lyrics	Singer(s)	Length
1.	"Huch Munde"	B. M. Giriraj	Chaitra H. G.	04:00
2.	"Aarada Ondu Gaya"	B. M. Giriraj	Hariharan	03:58
3.	"Kurudu Baavali"	B. M. Giriraj	Sujay N. Harthi	02:54
4.	"Preeti Onde Prarthane"	B. M. Giriraj	Rithisha Padmanabh	04:56

== Reception ==
Jatta received largely positive response from critics upon its release. G. S. Kumar of The Times of India gave the film a four star rating out of five and wrote, "Full marks to director BM Giriraj who has worked wonders with a story that captures human values, conflicts, dilemmas and tries to find a solution to them. With a good script and excellent narration, the director has made the movie interesting not only for the class but also for the mass audience." Shyam Prasad. S of Bangalore Mirror gave the film a 4.5/5 rating and wrote, "With just a handful of characters, Jatta dabbles with and intertwines various topics like feminism, male chauvinism, religious intolerance, adultery, Ambedkar-isms, corruption and cultural beliefs; all of which are dealt with in a simple yet engrossing narrative." He concluded by praising the role of all the departments in the film including directing, acting, cinematography and music.
