= Shootout at Alair =

Telugu crime drama web series

- Shootout at Alair Web series poster
- Genre: Action; Crime; Drama
- Written by: Anand Ranga
- Directed by: Anand Ranga
- Starring: Prakash Raj; Srikanth
- Country of origin: India
- Original language: Telugu
- No. of seasons: 1
- No. of episodes: 8

Production
- Producers: Sushmita Konidela; Vishnu Prasad
- Running time: 32-49 mins
- Production company: Gold Box Entertainment

Original release
- Network: ZEE5
- Release: 25 December – 25 December 2020

Shootout at Alair is an Indian Telugu-language crime drama web series streaming on ZEE5 platform since 25 December 2020. The 8-episode web series was written and directed by Anand Ranga. The web series was produced under Gold Box Entertainment, established by Sushmita Konidela with her husband Vishnu Prasad. It stars Prakash Raj and Srikanth.

== Synopsis ==
Starting in 2007, on the anniversary of Mecca Masjid blasts, a terrorist named Akhtar is suspected to be killing Hindu policemen every year. Years later, Akthar is believed to be a slain terrorist who was killed in 2015 in an encounter. When a similar killing repeats at the blast site in 2019, the police wonders if Akhtar is still alive.

== Cast ==
- Srikanth as IG Praveen Chand
- Prakash Raj as DSP Suryanarayana
- Kranthi Kiran Kamaraju as Akthar's brother
- Nandini Rai as Nafisa
- Saranya
- Teja Kakumanu as Akhtar
- Ravi Kale
- Rajiv Kumar Aneja as Lawyer
- Sudheer Varma

== Episodes list ==
No. overall	No. in season	Title	Directed by	Written by	Original release date
1	1	"IG Praveen Chand"	Anand Ranga	Anand Ranga	25 December 2020
IG Pravin Chand is shocked to hear about a police constable shot point-blank in 2019. This incident reminds him of Akhtar Ahmed who had a similar pattern of killing police officers, who are considered as the architect of a similar incident that occurred in 2007. Is Akhtar back or is it a copy cat killing?
2	2	"Home Guard Vijendra Prasad"	Anand Ranga	Anand Ranga	25 December 2020
Home guard, Vijendra Prasad manages to survive an attack on him. However, he has the misfortune of seeing his colleagues Appaswamy and Veeraswamy shot dead by Akhtar on the 1st and 2nd Anniversary of the Makkah Masjid blast.
3	3	"Constable U. Rakesh"	Anand Ranga	Anand Ranga	25 December 2020
IG Praveen Chand forms a police team to find the serial killer. For this, he travels to Punganur in Chittoor district for recruiting Selva Kumari. She is the widow of U. Rakesh who was killed by Akhtar in 2009.
4	4	"Suspended Officer NK Amith"	Anand Ranga	Anand Ranga	25 December 2020
IPS NK Amith is a Hindi fanatic and has a personal problem to settle against Akhtar, who threatened to eliminate him. Amith was a close confidante of a big politician and he is now under investigation.
5	5	"Informer Mohd. Rafi"	Anand Ranga	Anand Ranga	25 December 2020
Md. Rafi raises funds for Akhtar by doing photography for a living. Rafi’s confidence is shaken by the respect he receives from the Police and is guilt-ridden. He becomes the informer of the police seeing all this.
6	6	"Octopus DSP Suryanarayana"	Anand Ranga	Anand Ranga	25 December 2020
Octopus DSP Suryanarayana seems lethargic and unprofessional. He always emphasises on following procedures but turns fierce when he faces Akhtar before his arrest.
7	7	"SI Ramaiah"	Anand Ranga	Anand Ranga	25 December 2020
SI Rameez receives a tip about SINI activities who killed a police constable, while he was celebrating his 1st wedding anniversary. Ramaiah and his team manage to eliminate them in an exchange for fire. However, Ramaiah succumbs too.
8	8	"Investigating officer Rajeshwar"	Anand Ranga	Anand Ranga	25 December 2020
Praveen Chand is called upon for investigation by the Human Rights Commission regarding the Akhtar encounter. Praveen offers proof he collected of the last 5 years which were enough to get Akhtar a death sentence.

== Release date ==
The web series was digitally launched on ZEE5 Platform on 25 December 2020.

== Reception ==
=== Critical reviews ===
On 29 December 2020, Pakaao rated the web series with 8/10 stars. With a review that Shootout at Alair is a good watch portraying the police force and their never-ending spirit to protect people. It also showcases how police officers maintain a balance between their professional & personal lives alongside everyday challenges. Displaying a complete picturization of their personal lives that includes their family that forms the core of the series. The performance of all the actors in the series is worthy of applause. The cinematography, rustic locations, and music by Naresh Kumaran are just right, and feel good throughout the series.

123telugu gave 3.25/5 stars to the series, stating that while the first few episodes fell short, later episodes pulled viewers into the story. They described series as a true tribute to all the sincere cops who lost their lives countering the terrorists, showing appreciation for Anand Ranga in bringing up such a sensitive and crucial concept once again. Actors like Srikanth, Teja Kakumanu & Prakash Raj did a fine job, while Nandini Rai and Gayathri Gupta's performance were decent.

On 26 December 2020, Binged criticized Shootout at Alair by giving 5.5/10 stars. Pointing out an issue with the direction of the web series. They stated that the way a particular scene is set, and what happens within the scene is utterly mundane, boring and repetitive. Although, highlights of the web series were the mid-season episodes, that displayed police bravery and presents the overall story. On the other hand, a few drawbacks were the opening of a few episodes that seemed rushed, but the ending is precise and the narrative becomes quite understandable.
