= Wagle =

Wagle is a surname that occurs in multiple cultures.

- It is one of the common surnames from Coastal Karnataka, Goan region of India. It is found to be one of the surname/family name (Upanama) amongst the Konkani Saraswat Brahmin (Mostly Rajapur Saraswat Brahmins and Goud Saraswat Brahmins). They speak the Goan/Mangalorean or Malvani Konkani dialect.
- Wagle (Wagale) is a family name of the Konkani community in the states of Maharashtra and Goa.
- In Nepal, the surname 'Wagle' is commonly used by the Brahmin community .They follow shukla yajurveda madhyandiniya sakha.
- In Norway, Wagle may be a habitational name derived from farmsteads in Rogaland named Vagle, from the Old Norse "vagl" meaning a ‘perch’ or ‘roost’, with reference to a high ridge between two lakes.

The name Wagle may refer to:

- Finn Wagle (1941–2026), Norwegian bishop in the Church of Norway
- Narayan Wagle (born 1968), Nepali journalist and writer
- Nikhil Wagle (born 1959), Indian journalist
- Sukrutha Wagle (born 1992), Indian actress
- Susan Wagle (born 1953), American politician
- Swarnim Wagle (born 1974), Nepali economist and policymaker
- Tellef Wagle (1883–1957), Norwegian sailor

== Other uses ==
- Wagle Estate, industrial district in Thane, India
- Wagle Ki Duniya, an Indian television series
