= Bombay Mittai =

Kanada-language comedy-drama film

- Directed by: Chandra Mohan
- Written by: Chandra Mohan
- Produced by: Soudha Sherif; Amir Sherif
- Starring: Niranjan Deshpande; Vikram; Disha Pandey; Chikkanna
- Cinematography: R K Shivakumar
- Edited by: K. M. Prakash
- Music by: Veer Samarth
- Production company: Touchwood Creations
- Distributed by: Bahar Films
- Release date: 15 May 2015
- Running time: 121 minutes
- Country: India
- Language: Kannada

Bombay Mittai is a 2015 Kannada-language comedy drama film, written and directed by Chandra Mohan. It stars Vikram, Disha Pandey, Niranjan Deshpande and Chikkanna. The film was produced by Soudha Sherif and Amir Sherif.

== Plot ==
Three friends, Vishnu, Seenu, and Sundra are travelling from Bangalore to Karwar to celebrate their friend Rocky's birthday party. Aditi, an adventurous girl, also joins the road trip at the request of Vishnu.

During their journey, the friends try unsuccessfully to impress Aditi. When the group reaches Karwar, Aditi, exhausted from the journey, leaves the party to take a nap and Sundra passes out, drunk.

Rocky enters Aditi's room and attempts to rape her. Aditi protects herself by hitting Rocky with a bottle and severely injuring him. When they hear the noise, Vishnu and Seenu rush in and take Rocky to the nearest government hospital.

Sundra sleeps through all of this, unaware that anything took place. Meanwhile, Rocky's assistant, Koty, sees the blood and immediately informs the police. After checking on Rocky at the hospital, Koty learns that he has been placed in the ICU. With this information, Koty and his associates think Rocky is unlikely to survive his injuries, and subsequently form a plan to take advantage of the situation and rob Rocky's home.

The police begin to search for the suspects based on Rocky's complaint. Vishnu blames Aditi for the incident. Seenu stands with Aditi, whilst Sundra is still unaware of what happened. They devise a plan to send Sundra to Rocky; to convince him to withdraw his complaint against the others, who did not take part in the incident. Rocky rejects this request and the police apprehend Sundra, Koty, and his associates.

Failing to gather information from Sundra, the three friends assume he was arrested. Sundra's lawyer advises him not to talk to the police until he has posted bail. As the three others drive back towards Bangalore, they pick up an elderly woman at the side of the road who is looking for her grandchild. Later on, they spot a police checkpoint and immediately turn the vehicle onto a crossroads. The police notice them trying to escape the roadblock and chase after them. After arresting them, the police find out that the elderly woman is the grandmother of a police officer named Inspector Satish. The police release them but have them arrested again (excluding the grandmother), based on information sent by the Karwar police station.

Aditi confides in Inspector Satish. She tells him what happened and asks him to let her meet Rocky. The police agree to let Aditi meet Rocky to work things out. She makes him aware of the errors of his ways, and he realizes that she was acting in self-defence. Rocky finally agrees to withdraw his complaint from the police, and Sundra is released. During the conversation between the inspector and Aditi, she reveals that she loves Seenu because he shows respect towards women.

== Cast ==
- Vikram as Vishnu
- Niranjan Deshpande as Seena
- Disha Pandey as Aditi
- Chikkanna as Sundra
- RJ Rohith as Inspector Satish
- Bullet Prakash as Koty
- Kishori Ballal as the grandmother of Satish
- Sunil as Rocky
- Naloor Narayan as Inspector

== Production ==
The film was shot in various locations in Karnataka, including Chikamagaluru, Madikeri, Mangalore and Mysore.

== Soundtrack ==
Bombay Mittai

Soundtrack album by Veer Samarth
- Released: 2015
- Recorded: 2014
- Genre: Feature film soundtrack
- Length: 24:22
- Label: Anand Audio
- Producer: Veer Samarth

Veer Samarth chronology
Adwaitha (2013)	Bombay Mittai (2015)	Charlie (2015)

No.	Title	Lyrics	Singer(s)	Length
1.	"Bombay Mittai"	V. Nagendra Prasad	Gurukiran	3:47
2.	"Kaarana Heladene"	Hrudaya Shiva	Anuradha Bhat	3:36
3.	"Mundenu Nee Helu"	Naveen Kumar	Chethan Gandharva	4:51
4.	"Snehane Ilade"	Naveen Kumar	Chethan Gandharva	4:58
5.	"Kelade Kaadi Nanna"	Naveen Kumar	Deepak Doddera	3:39
6.	"Haadona Koogi"	Nalloor Narayan	Shashank Sheshagiri	6:15

Naveen Kumar wrote the song "Chaliyagtide" reused the title theme of Aashiqui 2. The song is one minute long and was used for film promotion, however it was not included in the official soundtrack.

== Release ==
The film was released on 15 May 2015.

A Telugu version of the movie was released in 2017 by Bhimavaram Talkies.

== Reception ==
Sunayana Suresh of The Times of India gave the film a rating of 3.5 stars, writing that "The story is crisp, has a lot of fun moments, and easily works in the 'timepass' movie genre". S. Viswanath of Deccan Herald wrote that "With a pleasant music score by Veer Samarth, and colourful cinematography, the film is a true entertainer and one for the family. Kudos to Chandramohan".
