= Moksha (2013 film) =

- Directed by: Srikanth Vemulapalli
- Written by: Srikanth Vemulapalli
- Produced by: P. Amarnath Reddy
- Starring: Meera Jasmine; Rajeev Mohan; Disha Pandey
- Cinematography: Venkata Prasad
- Edited by: M.R.Varma
- Music by: Vijay Kurakula
- Distributed by: Amarnathan Movies
- Release date: 28 June 2013
- Running time: 97 min
- Country: India
- Language: Telugu
- Budget: ₹1 crore (US$120,000)
- Box office: ₹2 crore (US$240,000)(9 days)

Moksha is a 2013 Telugu-language horror film which is loosely based on the 2010 Hollywood movie Let Me In and directed by Srikanth Vemulapalli, who has earlier directed the movie Black and White (2008). The film stars actress Meera Jasmine in lead role. Rajeev Mohan and Disha Pandey played significant roles in the film.

The movie was released on 28 June 2013.

== Plot ==
Sreenu is a frightened college student. Everyone in the college teases and starts hitting Sreenu but Nisha loves Sreenu. But Sreenu does not like her much. In the meantime, Moksha our lead heroine Meera Jasmine comes into picture.

Moksha and her father shifted to the city and whose residence is next to the Sreenu's house. As Moksha attitude is totally different like she will not come out of the home in the morning and will be out in the nights itself. One fine night Sreenu met Moksha. By that time some murders already take place in their area.

One night Sreenu's classmates see him sitting with Moksha and invite them to the "Valentine's day" party. At the party, Sreenu's classmates get him drunk and try to rape Moksha, however the friend who tries to rape Moksha dies in a horrendous manner.

Moksha's father warns her not to go out with Sreenu else they would have to move away from this house too. Moksha silently listens to him.

Nisha approaches a tantrik hoping to learn a trick or two to attract Sreenu. However the Tantrik tells her that her dreams cannot be realised.

== Cast ==
- Meera Jasmine as Moksha
- Rajeev Mohan as Sreenu
- Disha Pandey
- Nassar as Moksha's father
- Rahul Dev
- Sana

== Production ==
The film's shooting started in November 2009 and was held in Ramoji Film City, Hyderabad and Chennai.
