= Abhishek Vinod =

Indian actor

- Born: c. 1982; Chennai, India
- Other name: Abhishek
- Occupations: actor, model
- Years active: 2010–present
- Height: 1.95 m (6 ft 5 in)

Abhishek Vinod is an Indian actor who has appeared in Tamil and Malayalam language films. After working as a model, he made his breakthrough as a police inspector in Veruli, directed by Amudhavanan P and with a supporting role in Jeethu Joseph's Papanasam (2015). He later moved on to play leading roles and appeared in other high-profile Tamil films, such as Sketch (2018).

== Career ==
Born in Chennai, Abhishek completed his schooling at Kola Saraswathi Vaishnav Senior Secondary School and then completed his Bachelor of Business Administration from Madras University, before beginning a career in modelling in 2004. Abhishek worked in advertisements and the modelling circuit in Chennai and first acted in Malayalam film Casanovva with Mohanlal. He later portrayed the badboy senior role in Inidhu Inidhu in 2010. Abhishek portrayed a significant supporting role in the Kamal Haasan-starrer Papanasam (2015), as the younger brother of the character played by Gautami. The film garnered critical acclaim for the actor upon release and remains his highest profile release. He was offered the role by his mentor, Suresh Kannan, who had worked on the film as a co-director with Jeethu Joseph. He then appeared in the lead role in Veruli (2017), which was his masterpiece, which had a low-profile release and went unnoticed at the box office.

In early 2018, he appeared in Vijay Chandar's Sketch as a police officer alongside Vikram, and in Mannar Vagaiyara as a part of a large family. He was also seen in Aan Devathai (2018), playing a negative role as the head of an IT company, enrolled his mass acting with the project featuring him alongside Samuthirakani, Ramya Pandian and Suja Varunee.

== Personal life ==
Abhishek Vinod is married to Chennai-based designer Jules Idi Amin and has a son.

== Filmography ==
Year	Film	Role	Notes
2010	Inidhu Inidhu	College senior	
2012	Casanovva	Arjun	Malayalam film
2015	Kadavul Paathi Mirugam Paathi	Jai	
2015	Inimey Ippadithan	Karthik	
2015	Papanasam	Thangaraj	
2016	Arthanari	Kidnapper	
2017	Veruli	Ashwin	
2018	Sketch	Shakthivel	
2018	Mannar Vagaiyara	Karunakaran	
2018	Kattu Paya Sir Intha Kaali		
2018	Aan Devathai	Roy	
2018	Nila Nila Odi Vaa	Alex	Web series released on Viu
2019	Mei		
2020	Oh My Kadavule	Mathew	
2020	Walter	Venkat	
2020	Yaadhumagi Nindraai		Film released on ZEE5
2020	Time Up		
2021	Pei Mama	Veeramani	
2022	Vezham	Selvam	
2022	Battery	David Santhosh	
2023	Pathu Thala	Kota Rao	
2023	Rudhran	Ganga	
2024	Siren	Manickathangam's son	
2024	Garudan	Adv. Kathiravan	
2025	Maargan	Rajesh	
2026	Anali		
