= Vyavastha =

- Official poster
- Genre: Legal drama Suspense
- Written by: Ravi Mallu; Shravan Shiva(Thayanidhy Sivakumar)
- Story by: Rajasimha Tadinada
- Directed by: Anand Ranga
- Music by: Naresh Kumaran
- Original language: Telugu
- No. of seasons: 1
- No. of episodes: 8

Production
- Producer: Pattabhi R. Chilukuri
- Cinematography: Anil Bhandari
- Production company: Anaganagana Film Company

Original release
- Network: ZEE5
- Release: 28 April 2023

Vyavastha is Telugu language suspense legal drama streaming television series directed by Anand Ranga for ZEE5. It stars Sampath Raj, Karthik Rathnam, Hebah Patel, Sukrutha Wagle, Kamna Jethmalani in key roles.

== Synopsis ==
In a tale that resembles the legendary David and Goliath narrative, a recent law graduate Vamsi Krishna challenges a corrupt ruthless senior lawyer Chakraborty, who has monopolised the legal system by creating an organization which has the best lawyers working for him.

== Cast ==
- Sampath Raj as Adv. Avinash Chakraborthy
- Karthik Rathnam as Junior Lawyer Vamsi Krishna
- Hebah Patel as Yamini
- Kamna Jethmalani as Gayathri Chakraborthy, Avinash's wife
- Sukrutha Wagle as Kalpika, Avinash's sub-ordinate
- Shivani as Samyuktha
- Gayathri Ravisankar as mother
- Sujith Kumar Reddy as Teja
- Raja Ashok as Lawyer Smaran
- Gururaj Manepalli as Appa Rao
- Bhavana Vazhapandal as Avinash's daughter
- Kranthi Kiran Kamaraju as Ajay

== Release ==
It was announced on 21 April 2023, that the series will premiere on ZEE5 on 28 April. It was made available in Telugu and Tamil languages.

== Reception ==
The Times of India rated it 2.5 out of 5 and commented, "it packs enough drama and thrill and makes for a decent watch." ABP News, while praising the performances of the actors, rated it 2 out of 5." The Telugu Samayam also rated it 2.5 out 5 while commending the cinematography and background score of the show. Track Tollwood, rating it 2.75 out of 5, made special mention about the performances of the lead actors.
