= Gowli (film) =

2023 Indian-Kannada language film

- Directed by: Soora
- Written by: Soora
- Produced by: Raghu Singham
- Starring: Srinagara Kitty; Paavana Gowda; Rangayana Raghu; Sharath Lohithaswa
- Cinematography: Sandeep Valluri
- Edited by: Umesh R. B
- Music by: Shashank Sheshagiri
- Production company: Sohan Film Factory
- Release date: 24 February 2023
- Running time: 142 minutes
- Country: India
- Language: Kannada

Gowli is a 2023 Indian Kannada-language action drama film written and directed by Soora in his directorial debut, produced by Raghu Singham. It stars Srinagara Kitty, Paavana Gowda, Rangayana Raghu and Sharath Lohithaswa. The film marks Srinagara Kitty's comeback to Kannada cinema after 6 years in the lead role.

Gowli was released on 24 February 2023 and received mixed reviews from critics.

== Premise ==
Gowli is a cow herder in Sirsi, North Karnataka, who lives with his wife Girija, uncle Kakka and daughter Puttavva. Girija runs a tuition class as she is the only educated person in the village. One day, Girija's student Bhoomakka goes missing, and the incident leads to a conflict between the police and Gowli. Inspector Kalinga, who holds a grudge against Girija for slapping him, begins to tear Gowli's families' lives apart with the help of some dacoits. Enraged, Gowli sheds his gentle behaviour and sets on a violent crusade to bring them down.

== Cast ==
- Srinagara Kitty as Gowli
- Paavana Gowda as Girija
- Rangayana Raghu as Kakka
- Sharath Lohithaswa as Inspector Kalinga
- Yash Shetty

== Soundtrack ==
The music of the film is composed by Shashank Sheshagiri

Track listing
No.	Title	Lyrics	Singer(s)	Length
1.	"Bogaseyyali"	V. Nagendra Prasad	Tippu; Indu Nagaraj
2.	"Magale Hegale Vimaana Ninage"	V. Nagendra Prasad	Vijay Prakash; Shruthi Prahlad
3.	"Maha Rakkasa"	Ashrit V. L	Shashank Sheshagiri

== Release ==
Gowli was released on 24 February 2023.

=== Critical response ===
Harish Basavarajaiah of The Times of India gave 3 out of 5 stars and wrote "Director Soora could have done a better job with the writing to keep the content engaging and intriguing. The movie manages to score some brownie points on making front. It can be a one time watch, if you are ready to bear action and bloody sequences." A. Sharaadha of Cinema Express gave 3 out of 5 stars and wrote "Gowli is a rural family drama, filled with violence, revenge, and emotions. Kitty is the major driving factor to see Gowli, and if you like bloodshed, this can be your weekend watch."

Swaroop Kodur of OTTplay gave 2.5 out of 5 stars and wrote "As writer, Soora manages to build a compelling world in the first half but the shortcomings show up quite early in the second half, thus rendering the rest of the film tedious. The action sequences are exciting but seem relentless after a point." Shuklaji of The News Minute gave 2.5 out of 5 stars and wrote "With the help of a better script and finer editing, the film could have salvaged what it had put together in the first half. Sadly, the second half's inadequacies derail it. Still, Gowli is not completely unworthy of a visit to the theatre, but be prepared to stomach some disturbing sequences."
