= Paavana Gowda =

Indian actress

- Born: Mandya, Karnataka
- Occupation(s): Actress, model
- Years active: 2013–present

Paavana Gowda is an Indian actress who has appeared predominantly in Kannada films. After making her debut in Gombegala Love (2013), she has been seen in films including Tootu Madike (2022) and Vindhya Victim Verdict V3 (2023).

== Career ==
Paavana made her acting debut in the critically-acclaimed romantic drama Gombegala Love (2013), portraying the role of a girl who is paralysed, who is then wedded to a man also bed ridden. She then continued to play lead roles in Kannada films, notably appearing in Jatta (2013) and Kannadiga (2021) opposite Ravichandran. In 2023, she made her debut in Tamil films with the title role in Vindhya Victim Verdict V3 (2023).

In 2018, Paavana began working on Badiger Devendra's female-centric film, Rudri, where she portrayed the lead role. The film won several awards during a run at international film festivals, including Best Actress for Paavana, and is expected to release in 2023. Her other completed, upcoming films include Mysore Diaries, Prabhutva, Karky, Kaliveera, Mehbooba, and Fighter.

== Filmography ==
Films

- Note: all films are in Kannada, unless otherwise noted.

| Year | Film | Role | Notes |
|---|---|---|---|
| 2013 | Gombegala Love | Kamala | Nominated, SIIMA Best Kannada Female Debutant Award |
| 2013 | Jatta | Belli | |
| 2015 | Jackson | Kumudha | |
| 2015 | Aatagara | Anu | Nominated, Filmfare Award for Best Supporting Actress – Kannada |
| 2017 | Chamak | | |
| 2018 | Vanilla | | |
| 2021 | Kannadiga | Gunabhadra's wife | |
| 2022 | Tootu Madike | Parimala | |
| 2022 | Saddu Vicharane Nadeyuttide | Janani | |
| 2022 | Mysore Diaries | | OTT release |
| 2023 | Vindhya Victim Verdict V3 | Vindhya | Tamil film |
| 2023 | Gowli | Girija | |
| 2023 | Rudri | | OTT release |
| 2023 | Fighter | | |
| 2024 | Mehabooba | | |
| 2025 | Agnyathavasi | Pankaja | |
| TBA | Karky | | Post-production |
