= Veruli =

2017 Indian film by P. Amudhavanan

- Theatrical release poster
- Directed by: P. Amudhavanan
- Written by: P. Amudhavanan
- Produced by: P. Amudhavanan
- Starring: Abhishek Vinod; Syed Subahan; Ravi Prakash
- Cinematography: Siva Prabhu; Gavaskarraju
- Edited by: Gavaskarraju
- Music by: V. M. Dinesh Raja; R. S. Raj Prathap
- Production company: Team A Ventures
- Release date: 16 June 2017
- Country: India
- Language: Tamil

Veruli (transl. Scarecrow) is a 2017 Indian Tamil-language action thriller film produced, written and directed by P. Amudhavanan. Starring Abhishek Vinod, Syed Subahan, Ravi Prakash and Archana Singh, the film's original score and soundtrack were composed by V. M. Dinesh Raja and R. S. Raj Prathap, and has cinematography by Siva Prabhu.

The film's plotline revolved on potholes in India which have become death traps. The film had a theatrical release across Tamil Nadu on 16 June 2017.

== Cast ==
- Abhishek Vinod as Ashwin
- Syed Subahan
- Ravi Prakash
- Archana Singh
- Shanmugasundaram
- T. M. Karthik
- Jayachandran as Shankar
- Hari
- G. Saravanan
- Ashok Pandian
- Roobika Jayakumar
- Indhumathy Manikandan
- Sanjay
- K. Bhagyaraj in a guest appearance

== Production ==
The film's director, Amudhavanan, who had previously worked on several short films, chose to make his first film on the topic of road safety. He quit his job at Tata Motors to make the film. Principal photography commenced on 8 April 2016 in Chennai. The film was shot in Chennai, Chittoor, Coimbatore and Kerala and was completed within 40 days by June 2016.

Singer Syed Subhahan made his debut as an actor with this film and portrayed the son of K. Bhagyaraj's character. He was approached by the director Amudhavanan, who was impressed by Syed's speeches on social issues during his participation in the Super Singer reality show. The film was among actor Shanmugasundaram's final films, as he died in August 2017.

== Soundtrack ==
The music was composed by V. M. Dinesh Raja and R. S. Raj Prathap.

Track listing
No.	Title	Singer(s)	Length
1.	"Mazhai Kalathil"	Syed Subahan
2.	"Rottu Mela"	Syed Subahan, Aparna Narayanan
3.	"Hey Thozha"	Aparna Narayanan, Sai Neysan, Dinesh Raja
4.	"Kaal Mela"	Syed Subahan, Aparna Narayanan
5.	"Malar Kannukulla"	Aparna Narayanan

== Marketing ==
A promotional event for the film was held in January 2017, and was notable for being "paperless". No papers or banners promoting the film were created, and guests were asked to use their smartphone instead and use the SHAREit app to promote the film. Amudhavanan noted "we want to motivate our audience to be socially responsible and want them to travel with us till the release of the movie".

== Release and reception ==
The film had a theatrical release across Tamil Nadu on 16 June 2017. A reviewer from Maalai Malar gave the film a middling review, while noting the screenplay improves as the film develops. Following the film's release, Amudhavanan announced that profits from the film would be spent for social causes and to create awareness on road safety.
