= Seyal =

2018 Indian Tamil-language film

- Directed by: Ravi Abbulu
- Written by: Ravi Abbulu
- Produced by: CR Rajan
- Starring: Rajan Tejeshwar; Tharushi; Chammak Chandra; Vinodhini
- Cinematography: Elaiyaraja
- Edited by: Nirmal
- Music by: Siddharth Vipin
- Production company: CR Creations
- Release date: 18 May 2018
- Running time: 130 minutes
- Country: India
- Language: Tamil

Seyal (transl. Action) is a 2018 Indian Tamil-language action drama film written and directed by Ravi Abbulu in his comeback. The film stars Rajan Tejeshwar and Tharushi with Chammak Chandra, Renuka, Ramdoss and Vinodhini Vaidyanathan in supportive roles. Siddharth Vipin was hired to score music for the film while cinematography is handled by A. Elaiyaraja. The film was released on 18 May 2018 alongside Ilaiyaraaja musical combo 18.05.2009 and received average reviews from the audience.

== Synopsis ==
A youngster thrashes a gangster following a minor altercation. The gangster who suffers a loss of face, now seeks revenge.

== Cast ==
- Rajan Tejeshwar as Karthik
- Tharushi as Aarathi
- Chammak Chandra as Dandapani
- Vinodhini as Dandapani's wife
- Sai Dheena as Seva
- Jayabalan as Thimingalam
- Ramdoss
- Renuka as Karthik's mother

== Production ==
The film was announced by director Ravi Abbulu who made his comeback as film director after 17 long years as he last directed Vijay starrer Shahjahan in 2001. The director lamenting himself that he had to wait for a long time to direct films in order to choose good scripts. The director hired Telugu actor Rajan Tejeshwar in the male lead role who eventually made his Tamil film debut and the film is produced by Rajan Tejeshwar's father CR Rajan under his production banner CR Creations. Another Telugu film actor Chammak Chandra was also hired to play a supporting role in the film as the latter also made his Tamil film debut alongside the lead actor.

== Soundtrack ==
The music for the film is scored by Siddharth Vipin and the soundtrack was launched on 5 January 2018 consisting of four songs. Lalithanand penned lyrics for the songs. The album was well received by the audience.

Seyal (Original Motion Picture)

Soundtrack album by Siddharth Vipin
- Released: 5 January 2018
- Genre: Feature film soundtrack
- Length: 16:44
- Label: TrendMusic

Siddharth Vipin chronology
1971: Beyond Borders (2017)	Seyal (Original Motion Picture) (2018)	Junga (2018)

Soundtrack
No.	Title	Music	Singer(s)	Length
1.	"Vittu Thallu"	Siddharth Vipin	Jagadeesh	3:27
2.	"Maatikiten"	Siddharth Vipin	Aysha Farheen	4:11
3.	"Neeva Uyre"	Siddharth Vipin	Chinmayi; Karthik	5:03
4.	"Kozhi Mutte"	Siddharth Vipin	Anthony Daasan	4:03
