= Syed Subahan =

Indian actor

Syed subahan
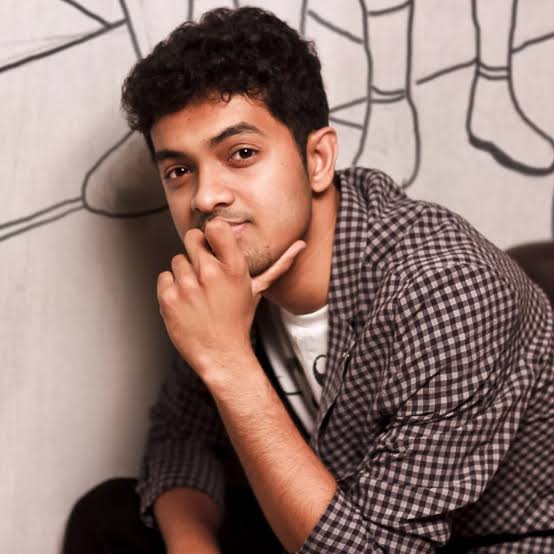
- Born: 10 October 1991 (age 34)
- Education: Metallurgical engineering at PSG Tech in Coimbatore
- Occupations: Indian playback singer, actor
- Years active: 2014–present
- Television: Super Singer 4
- Website: https://www.viberate.com/artist/syed-subahan/

Syed Subahan (born 10 October 1991) is an Indian playback singer, actor, and live performer. He is best known for winning Airtel Super Singer 4 who has worked predominantly in the Tamil Films industry. A leading actor of Tamil cinema, a star with his first film, the 2017 action Veruli, He played further action roles in Weapon
