= Tootu Madike =

- Tootu Madike First Look
- Directed by: Chandra Keerthi M
- Written by: Chandra Keerthi M
- Screenplay by: Chandra Keerthi M; ASG; Dollar
- Produced by: Madhusudhan KS Rao; Shivakumar KB
- Starring: Pramod Shetty; Chandra Keerthi M; Paavana; Girish Shivanna
- Cinematography: Naveen Challa
- Edited by: Ujwal Chandra
- Music by: Swamynathan RK
- Production companies: Giri Basava Production; Sarvata Cine Garage; SpreadON Studio
- Release date: 8 July 2022
- Running time: 130 min
- Country: India
- Language: Kannada

Tootu Madike is a 2022 Indian Kannada language comedy suspense film written and directed by Chandra Keerthi and produced under Sarvata Cine Garage and Giri Basava Productions in association with SpreadOn Studio. It stars Pramod Shetty, Chandra Keerthi, and Paavana. Apart from directing and acting in the film Chandra Keerthi wrote the script and the story of the film. The dialogues are written by Raghu Niduvalli. The cinematography and music handled by Naveen Challa and Swamynathan RK respectively.

Pre-production began in March 2019. Principal photography of the film began in August 2019 and the film is shot entirely in Bangalore, Karnataka. The first look poster of the film was unveiled by Dr.Shivarajkumar on 9 December 2019. All production and post production work are completed as of 2020. Due to COVID-19 pandemic the film's release has been postponed. The film released on 8 July 2022.

== Cast ==
- Pramod Shetty as Anantu
- Chandra Keerthi as Nasgunni
- Paavana Gowda as Parimala
- Girish Shivanna as Dollar
- Uggram Manju as Tom
- Shankar Ashwath as Ramdas
- Nanda Gopal as Kannan
- Arun Murthy as Papanna
- Sitara as Premakka
- Raghavendra N as Nagaraju
- Naresh Bhat as Rakesh

== Soundtrack ==
Swamynathan RK has been signed to compose the songs and score for the film. The songs are written by Chethan Kumar of Bharaate fame, Nithin Narayan and others. The choreography of the songs are done by Mohan Master. Vijay Prakash and Chethan Naik has lend his voice for a song in the film and guitars are recorded by Keba Jeremiah.
