= Kesava Kiran =

Indian music director and composer (born 1989)

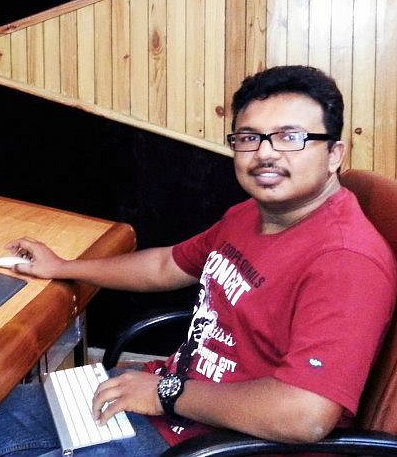

Background information
- Born: 16 February 1989 (age 36); Hyderabad, India
- Genres: Film score
- Occupations: Composer, music director

Kesava Kiran (born 16 February 1989 in Hyderabad, India) is an Indian music director and composer. He made his debut in the Telugu film Mooga Manasulu, in 2013.

== Early life ==
Kesava Kiran was very passionate towards music from his childhood. At the age of 6, he started experimenting with musical instruments, observing this his uncle Rajasekhar, who is a Singer and Guitarist encouraged Kesava Kiran and dat is how his musical journey started. Kesava Kiran had given many music performances along with his friends from his school days and gradually his passion towards music made him to set his career in the music field. His mainstream instruments were rhythms and keyboard.

== Career ==
Kesava Kiran has composed an album named Ennallila, in 2011 produced by his friend Eashan Praveen which was released by Aditya Music and got huge applause from the listeners and even became a milestone in his career because impressed by this work, he was introduced to MR.Productions by Sahithi Vangara (lyricist). MR.Productions liked Kesava Kiran's music and requested him to compose music for their short film "unfortunately" it is how he composed the song "Edho Maaya" which was an instant hit. Since then he composed music for many short films for various Production houses. He used the music website for artists, ReverbNation and topped the Reggae/Film Score charts with Rank #1 for India. Feature Film makers approached Kesava Kiran after Listening to the song "Challaga" from one of his short film, to compose music for a Telugu feature film, Mooga Manasulu Directed by Mahesh Kanakala & Lyrics were written by Anantha Sreeram. Audio of Mooga Manasulu was released on 24 March 2013 through Aditya Music and met with high acclaim and praise topping the charts and has been rated 9/10 on many websites He has also contributed his vocals for a song "Em Chebutha" which is a duet with Geeta Madhuri in the film . He started his music career in 2012 and till today, he composed music for more than 150 Projects which include Feature films, Short films, Jingles, Singles and few private albums. He has won Best Music Director Award for "Its a Girl issue" Short film from shortfilmsintelugu.in.

Kesava Kiran Composed Music for a Promotional Song for the Movie Sardaar Gabbar Singh (Fan Made), which was released on 6 March 2016, started trending online instantly and became online sensation. His second promotional song for the movie Janatha Garage (Fan Made) has got more than 250K views on YouTube. Both the songs were penned by Kishore Babu Sambangi.

== Discography ==
=== Feature films ===
Year	Film title	Language	Notes
2013	Mooga Manasulu	Telugu	Audio Released
2014	Crush (Pori Vs Poragadu)	Telugu	Announced
2015	Padamati Sandhyaraagam London lo	Telugu	
2019	Rama Chakkani Seetha	Telugu	

=== Short films as a music director ===
Year	Short film title	Language	Notes
2012	Unfortunately	Telugu	
2012	Compromise	Telugu	
2012	Proposal	Telugu	
2012	Crazy Love	Telugu	As a Singer
2012	Miss-Understandings	Telugu	
2012	Sambaar Idly	Telugu	
2012	Love Logic Less	Telugu	
2013	Kala	Telugu	
2012	Vidhi En 8	Tamil	
2012	Challagaa	Telugu	
2012	My Love is True	Telugu	
2012	Andhamaina Prema Katha	Telugu	
2012	3+ 4+	Telugu	
2012	DCT	Telugu	
2012	Kadhal	Telugu	
2013	Donga Sachinooda	Telugu	
2012	Future	Telugu	
2012	Keys Keys ki Kismat	Hindi	Co-Composer
2013	Saradaga	Telugu	Filming
2013	Vasanthayanam	Telugu	
2013	Smruthi	Telugu	Filming
2013	The Stand Off	English	
2013	Jainie	Telugu	Co-Composer
2013	25 Days	Telugu	
2013	V	Telugu	
2013	Raayalavaari Aasthaanam	Telugu	
2014	Love Problem	Telugu	
2014	JUST IMAGINE	Telugu	
2015	Love Box	Silent	
2015	Its a Girl Issue	Telugu	
2015	Operation Pareshaan	Hindi	
2015	Pelli Choopulu	Telugu	
2015	Love Track	Telugu	
2015	Awakening	Telugu	
2015	Bandham	Telugu	
2015	Use Me Properly	Telugu	
2015	Awakening Anthem	Telugu	
2015	Zamaanaa	Telugu	
2016	Selfie Premakatha	Telugu	
2016	CarThick	Telugu	
2015	Next Today	Silent	
2016	Be a Hero	Silent	
2016	Kabhi Kabhi	Telugu	
2016	Baapu Bomma	Telugu	
2016	Samaaptham	Telugu	
2016	Anupama	Telugu	
2016	Kabhi Kabhi Mere Dil Mein	Telugu	
2016	Yedhalo Mounam	Telugu	
2016	Naa Lover Public Figure	Telugu	
2016	The Three Dogs	Telugu	
2016	A True Indian	Telugu	
2016	The Last Call	Telugu	
2017	Naya Love Story (Bit Song)	Telugu	Co-Composer
2017	Aame	Telugu	
2017	Maa Amma Seethamaalakshmi	Telugu	
2017	March 31	Telugu	
2017	Krishnapaksham	Telugu	
2017	Sorry Varalakshmi	Telugu	

=== Video/singles ===
Year	Film title	Language	Notes
2013	Parichayame	Telugu	
2011	Anandraju Love Story	Telugu	
2011	Oo Priya	Telugu	
2012	Kalaya	Telugu	
2013	Balarakshak Child Labour	Telugu	
2013	Lene Leru	Telugu	
2014	Ye Daarilo Veluthunnano	Telugu	
2014	New Year Song	Kannada	
2015	Manasulo Maata Cheppana	Telugu	
2015	Jobless by Yuvam	Telugu	
2015	Konaseema by Yuvam	Telugu	
2015	First Love Forever	Telugu	
2016	Sardaar Gabbar Singh Promotional Song (Fan Made)	Telugu	
2016	Janatha Garage Promotional Song (Fan Made)	Telugu	
2016	Cheliya Nee Valle	Telugu	

=== Album ===
Year	Album title	Language	Notes
2011	Ennallilaa	Telugu	

=== Ads ===
Year	Film title	Language	Notes
2013	MR Productions Ad	Telugu	
2014	Sri Thriveni School	Telugu	
2014	Violet & Purple	Telugu	
2016	Akshara Chit Funds	Telugu	
2016	Bhuvana Surya Developers	Telugu	
2016	Bhavithasri Chit Funds	Telugu	
2016	Prathibha Biotech	Telugu	
2017	Kapil Chit Funds	Telugu	
2017	Lalitha Brand	Telugu	
