= Oy! (film) =

- Movie Poster
- Directed by: Anand Ranga
- Written by: Anand Ranga
- Produced by: D. V. V. Danayya
- Starring: Siddharth; Shamili
- Cinematography: Vijay K. Chakravarthy
- Edited by: Marthand K. Venkatesh
- Music by: Yuvan Shankar Raja
- Production company: Universal Media
- Distributed by: Universal Media
- Release date: 3 July 2009
- Running time: 166 minutes
- Country: India
- Language: Telugu

Oy! is a 2009 Indian Telugu-language romantic drama film written and directed by debutant Anand Ranga. The film stars Siddharth and Shamili (in her first leading role), while Sunil and Ali play supporting roles. The music of the film was composed by Yuvan Shankar Raja. The story revolves around Uday (Siddharth) fulfilling the wishes of Sandhya (Shamili) during her last days, as the latter was diagnosed with cancer.

The film was released on 3 July 2009. The film is loosely based on the 2002 film A Walk to Remember. The film was dubbed in Tamil as Kadhal Alai.

Although the film was an average grosser in its initial release, it gained a strong cult following over the years and has remained as a favorite of many. It was eventually re-released on Valentine's Day 2024.

== Plot ==
Uday, is a rich kid who becomes the chairman of a company following his father's death. He believes in the adage of life is short and carpe diem. At a New Year's Party 2007, he spies on a girl called Sandhya in a salwar-kameez, writing a diary at the pub.

Through a series of searches with his friend Fatso, he ends up discovering that Sandhya lives alone at a beachside house and runs a nursery. She is very traditional with her own ideals. He enters in her house on a pretense as a paying guest to make her fall in love with him. After a series of attempts to woo Sandhya, Uday eventually succeeds and presents her with 12 gifts on her birthday, the last being Uday himself.

In a subplot, an insurance salesman named Abhishek ends up trying to show his younger and reclusive colleague "how to be a man" in many lessons that often result in the latter's physical pain. Eventually, the duo collides with the story's main plot when they attempt to sell Sandhya life insurance (which she later agrees to buy). When asked who the beneficiary of the policy should be, she writes Uday's name. When Uday hears this, he thinks that he has won Sandhya. However, it is revealed to Uday (through the insurance policy which has now been rejected) that Sandhya is suffering from breast cancer and has limited time left.

In the ensuing part of the film, Uday takes Sandhya on a cruise to Kolkata to spread her parents' ashes in the Ganga River. They run into several comic characters in their journey, including a kidnapped Abhishek who tries unsuccessfully to tell Sandhya that her policy was rejected because of her illness; his attempts are thwarted by Uday. These circumstances help Uday teach Sandhya how to live life, and back from the trip, Sandhya and Uday throw a Christmas party at Sandhya's beach house. However, Sandhya collapses in the aftermath of the party and discovers the truth about her health.

Sandhya eventually falls in love with Uday and says that she wants to spend the last days of her life with him. The ending scene has Uday and Sandhya sitting on a bench in the rain with a "Welcome 2008" sign in the background on New Year's Eve. The scene then fades to Uday sitting alone with a "Welcome 2009" sign in the background one year later waiting for the rain. This infers that Sandhya has died, but Uday still keeps her memories close to heart. The film ends with Uday leaving after the rain.

== Cast ==
- Siddharth as Uday
- Shamili as Sandhya Jagarlamudi
- Sunil as Abhishek
- Ali as Layout M. Lingaraju
- Napoleon as Dr. Harish Chandra Prasad
- Pradeep Rawat as Ras Bihari
- Krishnudu as Fatso
- M. S. Narayana as Hotel Manager
- Tanikella Bharani as Telugu Teacher
- Saptagiri as Abhishek's assistant
- Master Bharath as Maruthi
- Surekha Vani as Sandhya's friend
- Raavi Kondala Rao as Koteswara Rao "Kotigadu"
- Radha Kumari as Rajyamma
- Rallapalli as Advocate
- Bhanu as Loan Recovery Goon
- Baby Srilekha as Srilakshmi a.k.a. Sri
- Baby Harshitha as Srivijayalakshmi a.k.a. Viji
- Baby Nandini as Bhagyalakshmi
- Gururaj Manepalli as Uday's coworker

== Soundtrack ==
Oy!

Soundtrack album by Yuvan Shankar Raja
- Released: 22 May 2009
- Recorded: 2008–2009
- Genre: Feature film soundtrack
- Length: 29:18
- Label: Aditya Music
- Producer: Siddharth

Yuvan Shankar Raja chronology
Muthirai (2009)	Oy! (2009)	Gilli (2009)

The music, including film score and soundtrack was composed by Tamil film composer Yuvan Shankar Raja. The soundtrack, released on 22 May 2009 at Rama Naidu studios, features 6 tracks overall, out of which, Yuvan Shankar Raja himself has sung one song and one song by the film's lead actor Siddharth.The lyrics were penned by five people, with Vanamali writing the lyrics for three of the six songs, Chandrabose, Anantha Sreeram for each one song and Surendra Krishna and Krishna Chaitanya together for the last song. The theme is inspired from the Tom Hanks comedy, Forrest Gump.

Yuvan Shankar Raja received positive reviews for his musical score, which was described as a "rhythmic joy", "superb", "a blast" and "a highlight of the movie".

=== Track listing ===
Track list
No.	Title	Lyrics	Artist(s)	Length
1.	"Oy Oy"	Chandrabose	Siddharth, Prashanthini	4:42
2.	"Saradaga"	Anantha Sreeram	Sunidhi Chauhan, Karthik	4:38
3.	"Waiting For You"	Vanamali	K.K.	5:54
4.	"Anukoledenadu"	Vanamali	Shreya Ghoshal	4:44
5.	"Povadhe Prema"	Vanamali	Yuvan Shankar Raja	4:35
6.	"Seheri"	Surendra Krishna, Kirshna Chaitanya	Toshi Sabri, Priya Himesh	4:45
7.	"Tholisari Nee Deevene"	Telugu by Vanamali (Bhojpuri by unknown Kolkata guy)	Hariharan
Total length:				29:18

== Reception ==
A critic from Rediff.com wrote that "All in all, a good film". Jeevi of Idlebrain.com wrote that "One should have guts to make such a film in Telugu where heroine dies at the end". The film had an average run at the box office.

== Awards ==
=== Filmfare Awards South ===
- Filmfare Special Award - South for best Outstanding Score – Yuvan Shankar Raja
- CineMAA Award for Best Female Debut - Shamili
