= 100 Degree Celsius =

- Film poster
- Directed by: Rakesh Gopan
- Written by: Rakesh Gopan
- Produced by: Royson Vellara
- Starring: Shwetha Menon; Bhama; Meghana Raj; Ananya; Haritha Parokod
- Cinematography: Sathyan Sooryan
- Edited by: Don Max
- Music by: Gopi Sundar
- Production company: RR Entertainments
- Release date: 10 October 2014
- Country: India
- Language: Malayalam

100 Degree Celsius is a 2014 Malayalam film written and directed by Rakesh Gopan. A women-centric thriller scripted by Rakesh Gopan, it stars Shwetha Menon, Meghna Raj, Bhama, Ananya, and Haritha Parokod. Based on a real-life incident, 100 Degree Celsius revolves around the lives of five women – a housewife, banker, IT professional, TV reporter, and a college student. The film, whose shooting started in June 2013, would become Malayalam cinema's first two-part film. It is produced under the banner of R.R. Entertainments. The film's cinematographer is Satyanarayanan and music director is Gopi Sundar.

== Cast ==
- Shwetha Menon as Nila
- Bhama as Nancy
- Meghana Raj as Revathy
- Ananya as Ganga
- Haritha Parokod as Lovely
- Kaviyoor Ponnamma as Lovely's mother-in-law
- Sethu as Aravind
- Anil Murali as Balu
- Mithun Ramesh as Lovely's husband
- Sreejith Ravi as Sura
- Ganesh Kumar as Police Officer
- Shivaji Guruvayoor
- Sanju Sivram as Sreekuttan
- Kalabhavan Haneef
- Anjali Aneesh Upasana as Nanda
- Sreelatha Namboothiri as Nancy's mother-in-law
- T Parvathy as Adv. Rani Varma
- Deepika as Doctoress

== Production ==
Debutante director Rakesh Gopan, who had served as an associate to VKP and Rajasenan said, "It's based on a true story that happened in Kochi. The main characters are an IT professional, a TV channel reporter, a bank employee, a college student and a housewife", adding that the team will also bring out the real people who inspired the story, during the promotion of the film. "All these characters live in a flat and the story revolves around an incident that happens there. They try to cover this up and ultimately, it leads to their lives turning upside down. A thriller, the film deals with various issues that women in today's society have to go through – for instance, blackmailing" Rakesh said. Rakesh Gopan after months of scripting, found it was long for a single movie and decided to split it into two parts.

The film was earlier titled Mirror and was reported to star Shwetha Menon, Bhama, Gauthami Nair, Meghana Raj, and Aparna Nair. Later Gauthami Nair and Aparna Nair opted out citing date issues. While actress Ananya replaced Gauthami, Aparna was replaced by actress Haritha Parokod, who made her debut in Malayalam. Shwetha Menon plays a techie, Bhama, a bank employee, Meghna Raj, a news channel reporter, Ananya, a student, and Haritha a home-maker. Earlier, it was reported that Lakshmi Rai was also a part of the project. However, the director denied the rumours and said, "Lakshmi Rai was never part of it." Krish J Sathar was chosen as the male lead. Later the makers also cast a relative newcomer, Anu Mohan. With the film split into two, the makers also decided to make changes in the cast and cast Tamil and Telugu actor Shaam and Bollywood actress Radhika Apte, who both will make their Mollywood debut.

== Critical reception ==
The Times of India gave the film 3 stars out of 5 and wrote, "If what you want is to sit back and relax with a packet of popcorn, 100 Degree Celsius is not the film for you, as you would mostly be on your seat's edge, scene after scene. Rakesh Gopan joins the pack the debutant directors in Malayalam [sic], who tell unprecedented stories in our tinsel town. His effort is laudable, and besides a handful of glitches in execution that sets occasional boredom, the film is involving enough to keep one interested till the end". Indiaglitz.com gave a rating of 6.5 out of 10 and wrote, "With all other factors appealing, this '100-degree Celsius' can be prescribed for an onetime watch, especially for the lovers of adrenaline raising thriller films..".

Sify was more critical of the film and wrote, "With an absurd script, this film struggles to keep you engaged right from the start. The story just goes here and there without any logic. All you are surprised about is the serious way all those inane scenes have been presented here", going on to call it a "royal mess, nothing less".

Upon release, Dr. Manoj Narayanan Namboothiri, a psychologist from Trivandrum, filed a case against the director and the Censor Board, citing that "the film shows women in a poor light and can give out wrong messages to society".
