= Gombegala Love =

Indian Kannada-language romantic drama film

- Promotional poster
- Directed by: Santhosh
- Written by: Santhosh
- Produced by: Ajay Raj Urs
- Starring: Arun; Paavana Gowda
- Cinematography: Kiran Hampapur
- Edited by: K Eshwar
- Music by: Srinath Vijay
- Production company: Apple Films
- Release date: 8 February 2013
- Country: India
- Language: Kannada

Gombegala Love (transl. Love of dolls) is a 2013 Indian Kannada-language romantic drama film written and directed by newcomer Santhosh starring debutantes Arun and Paavana Gowda.

The film was released to positive reviews from critics and audiences alike, who praised the film for showcasing a different kind of love story.

== Cast ==
- Arun as Panju
- Paavana Gowda as Kamala
- Ramakrishna as Kamala's father
- Shruti as Panju's mother
- Achyuth Kumar as Panju's father

== Music ==
The music was composed by Srinath Vijay with lyrics by V. Nagendra Prasad.

Track listing
No.	Title	Singer(s)	Length
1.	"Ayyo Namage Preethityu"	Karthik, Kavitha	4:16
2.	"Premave Jeeva"	Chinmayi Sripada, Haricharan	4:10
Total length:			8:26

== Reception ==
G S Kumar of The Times of India rated the film 3.5/5 and wrote, "With a philosophical touch to a sentimental story, the film is a brilliant one with a strong message". A critic from IANS rated the film 4/5 and wrote, "'Gombegala Love', a fresh attempt by newcomers, will captivate the audience with its realistic and absorbing narration". A critic from IBN Live wrote, "'Gombegala Love', a fresh attempt by newcomers, will captivate the audience with its realistic and absorbing narration.".
