= Suryapet Junction =

- Poster
- Directed by: Rajesh Nadendla
- Written by: Rajendra Bharadwaj; Satya Rishi
- Produced by: Aneel Kumar Katragadda; N Srinivas Rao
- Starring: Eeswar; Naina Sarwar; Abhimanyu Singh
- Cinematography: Arun Prasad
- Edited by: MR Varma
- Music by: Roshan Saluri
- Production company: Yoga Lakshmi Art Creations
- Release date: 25 April 2025
- Running time: 120 minutes
- Country: India
- Language: Telugu

Suryapet Junction is a 2025 Indian Telugu-language action drama film directed by Rajesh Nadendla, with dialogue penned by Rajendra Bharadwaj and Satya Rishi. It is produced by Aneel Kumar Katragadda, N Srinivas Rao under Yoga Lakshmi Art Creations. The film stars Eeswar, Naina Sarwar, and Abhimanyu Singh in the lead roles. Suryapet Junction was released theatrically on 25 April 2025. The film opened to positive reviews from critics.

== Plot ==
Arjun, Lakshman, Bhasha, Harish, and Surya are engineering students living together in a college hostel. They enjoy life, relying on scholarships and government-provided amenities their families receive. Narasimha, driven by his ambition to fulfill his dream of becoming a three-term MLA (Member of Legislative Assembly), runs the local syndicate with ruthless efficiency. Anyone who tries to obstruct Narasimha's path faces Karna's wrath, who eliminates them and disposes of their bodies in a well. One such victim is Major [Bhel Prasad], whose daughter Jyothi operates a canteen near the college. As Arjun continues to indulge in his carefree lifestyle thanks to the free benefits, Jyothi and Karna unexpectedly enter his life. Tragically, Lakshman becomes a victim of Narasimha's arrogance. This loss shakes Arjun, prompting him to reflect on the realities of life. Determined to honor his friend, Arjun motivates his companions to overcome their academic struggles and clear all their backlogs. Ultimately, Narasimha and Karna meet their fate in the depths of the same well that harbored their deeds. The story concludes on a hopeful note as Jyothi steps into Arjun's life, marking a new chapter for him.

== Cast ==
- Eeswar as Arjun
- Naina Sarwar as Jyoti
- Abhimanyu Singh as Narasimha
- Muralidhar Goud as Party President
- Laxman
- Bhasha
- Harish
- Surya
- Chammak Chandra
- Chalaki Chanti
- Pooja (Matching Matching song)

== Crew ==
- Editor: Mr. Varma
- Music Directors: Roshan Saluri, GowraHari (Matching Matching)
- Story : Eeswar
- Dialogues : Satya Rishi, Rajendra bharadwaja
- Poster Designer: Dhani aelay
- Fights : Ramakrishna (bimbisara) malles Shalon
- Executive producer; Pandu alijala
- Producers: Aneel Kumar Katragadda
- N Srinivas Rao
- Director: Rajesh N
- Pro : Kadali Media Team, Kadali Rambabu
- Digital Marketing: celebritymediaoffical
- G V Lakshma Reddy

== Soundtrack ==
Roshan Saluri has composed music for three tracks written by Rahman, along with a background score. And Gowra Hari wrote and composed a special song. Audio released by Tips Music.

| No. | Title | Singer(s) | Length |
|---|---|---|---|
| 1. | "Mere Yara" | Rahul Sipligunj and Curus |
| 2. | "Chengu Cheguna" | Sai Charan and Curus |
| 3. | "Oka Pranam" | Sri Krishna |
| 4. | "Matching Matching" | Keerthana Sharma, Gowra Hari |
