= Nandi Award for Best Female Dubbing Artist =

Indian film award

This is the complete list of recipients of the Nandi Award for Best Female Dubbing Artist since 1997, when this category was instituted.

Year	Artist	Film
2016	Lipsika Bhashyam	Ekkadiki Pothavu Chinnavada
2015	Sowmya Sharma	Baahubali: The Beginning
2014	Chinmayi	Manam
2013	Mytra Varuna Mahi	Uyyala Jampala
2012	Shilpa	Veerangam
2011	Sunitha	Sri Rama Rajyam
2010	Chinmayi	Ye Maaya Chesave
2009	Sowmya Sharma	Mahatma
2008	R. Haritha	Nachavule
2007	Sowmya Sharma	Lakshyam
2006	Savitha Reddy	Bommarillu
2005	Sunitha	Pothe Poni
2004	Sunitha	Anand
2003	Savitha Reddy	Missamma
2002	Sunitha	Jayam
2001	Savitha Reddy	Nuvvu Naaku Nachav
2000	Shilpa	Vijaya Rama Raju
1999	Shilpa	Anaganaga Oka Ammai
1998	Saritha	Anthapuram
1997	Saritha	Maa Ayana Bangaram
1996	Saritha	Maavichiguru
1995	Saritha	Ammoru

== See also ==
- List of music awards honoring women
