= Chammak Chandra =

Indian comedian and actor

- Born: Venkatapur, Andhra Pradesh, India (now in Telangana, India)
- Occupations: Actor, comedian
- Years active: 2004–present

Chammak Chandra is an Indian comedian and actor who works in Telugu films and television shows. He is known for the Jabardasth comedy show.

== Early life and career ==
Chandra was born in Venkatapur in Nizamabad, Telangana. He made his film debut in the Teja film Jai. Later he performed skits with actor Dhanraj and Venu Yeldandi and earned the attention of producer Mallemala. He found an opportunity in performing in the Jabardast comedy show. He made his Tamil debut with Seyal (2018).

== Filmography ==
Year	Title	Role	Notes
2004	Jai	Sheikh's supporter	
2007	Manmadha Ravula Kosam		Special appearance in the song “Naa Petta Thalam”
2012	Gabbar Singh	Villager	
2012	Sudigadu	Anchor	
2012	Mem Vayasuku Vacham	Beggar	
2013	Chandee	Constable	
2014	Ugram		
2014	Race Gurram		
2014	Run Raja Run	Fake Bujji	
2014	Boochamma Boochodu	Yadagiri	
2014	Chakkiligintha	Ailesh	
2015	Yavvanam Oka Fantasy		
2015	Galipatam	Karthik’s friend	
2015	Ayyo Rama		
2016	Chuttalabbai		
2016	Anu Vamshi katha		
2016	Ekkadiki Pothavu Chinnavada	Auto driver	
2016	Banthi Poola Janaki	Ahamkaram	
2016	Naanna Nenu Naa Boyfriends	Servant’s lover	
2016	A Aa	Bhanu’s former fiance	
2016	Selfie Raja		
2017	Iddari Madya 18		
2017	Raja The Great	Siddharth	
2017	Premante Suluvukadura		
2017	Virus		
2018	Raa Raa		
2018	Agnyaathavaasi	Watchman	
2018	Manyam		
2018	Siva Kasipuram		
2018	Aatagadharaa Siva		
2018	Manchu Kurise Velalo		
2018	Taxiwaala	Fake fakir	
2018	Ego	Jeeva	
2018	Seyal	Dandapani	Tamil film
2018	Aravinda Sametha Veera Raghava		
2019	Gaddalakonda Ganesh	Auto driver	
2019	RDX Love	Hostel Warden / Fake Bride	
2019	Tenali Ramakrishna BA. BL	Varalakshmi Devi's henchman	
2019	Venky Mama	Nukaraju	
2020	Namaste Nestama		
2020	Ala Vaikunthapurramloo	Chittila Murthy	
2021	Alludu Adhurs	Gaja's henchmen	
2021	April 28 Em Jarigindi		
2021	Adbhutham	Prospective groom	
2021	Drushyam 2	Watchman	
2021	Akhanda	Murali’s fan	
2022	Hero	Clinic worker	
2022	Suraapanam	Rambabu	
2022	Ginna	Rakesh Master	
2022	Bimbisara		
2022	Dhamaka		
2023	Waltair Veerayya	Goon	
2023	Slum Dog Husband		
2023	Veera Simha Reddy		
2023	Suryapet Junction		
2023	Extra Ordinary Man	Paidthalli	Uncredited
2023	Jilebi		Driver Nani
2024	Kismat	T. Shankarayya	
2024	Vey Dharuvey		
2024	Mr. Bachchan	Chitti Babu	
2024	Uruku Patela	Attar Mawa	
2024	Laggam	DJ Prakash	
2025	Mazaka		
2025	Thammudu	Narasaiah	
2025	Ari: My Name is Nobody		
2025	Mass Jathara	Tulasi Das	
2026	Vanaveera	PK	
2026	Anaganaga Oka Raju	Gumastha	
2026	Ustaad Bhagat Singh	Cafe Customer	
2026	Sampradayini Suppini Suddapoosani	Chandra	
2026	Bad Boy Karthik		

=== Television ===
Year	Title	Role	Network
2014–2019	Jabardasth	Chammak Chandra	ETV Telugu
2020	Adhirindi	Chammak Challengers	Zee Telugu
2021	Comedy Stars	Crazy Chandra	Star Maa
