= Kadavul Paathi Mirugam Paathi =

2015 Indian film by Raaj Menon and Suresh

- Directed by: Raaj Zacharias; Suresh
- Produced by: Raj Zacharias
- Starring: Raj Zacharias; Sethu; Abhishek Vinod; Swetha Vijay
- Cinematography: Kishore Mani
- Edited by: V. T. Vijayan
- Music by: Rahul Raj
- Production companies: Celebs & Red Carpet Studios
- Release date: 20 March 2015
- Country: India
- Language: Tamil

Kadavul Paathi Mirugam Paathi (transl. Half God, Half Beast) is a 2015 Indian Tamil-language action thriller film directed by Raaj Menon and Suresh. The film produced by Raj Zacharias, also features him in the lead role while Sethu, Abhishek Vinod and Swetha Vijay form the leading cast. Although originally planned with a different ensemble cast in 2011, the project finally materialised in mid 2013. The original score and soundtrack of the movie were composed by Rahul Raj. The film released to negative reviews from both audience and critics alike and was a box office bomb. The film was dubbed and released in Telugu as Rahadaari in 2016.

== Cast ==
- Raj Zacharias
- Sethu
- Abhishek Vinod as Jai
- Swetha Vijay as Neha
- Arjuna in a guest appearance
- Pooja Umashankar in a guest appearance

== Production ==
The film was announced as early as June 2011 when it was revealed that Raaj Menon would make a film to be produced by socialite Raj Zacharias. It was suggested that filming for the project, based on a story of four youngsters, would begin in August 2011 with Resul Pookutty signed on as sound engineer. Arya, Narain and Aadhi were signed to play three of the lead roles, while the director announced that no lead actress be in the cast. The team released a series of posters featuring silhouettes and then revealed that Anoop Menon, Prakash Raj, Atul Kulkarni and Santhanam amongst others would play supporting roles. Aadhi later stated that he would play a guest appearance, though noted that in October 2011 that Raaj Menon had not contacted him since June about the project. The film subsequently failed to take off and the project was postponed.

The film re-began work in October 2013 and a teaser trailer was released in 2014 featuring an all-new cast with producer Raj Zacharias playing a leading role. The film added in Suresh to co-direct the film with Raaj Menon, while Rahul Raj replaced Navneeth Sunder as the film's composer. Actor Sethu, previously seen in Mynaa (2010), also featured in a prominent role, while debutants Abhishek Vinod and Swetha Vijay also appeared in the film. An item number, "Meenamma Meenamma" was choreographed by Gayathri Raghuram featuring actor Arjuna of Kangaroo fame, and actress and model Surabhi Prabhu. Actress Pooja Umashankar enacted a cameo role in the film, revealing that she had accepted the offer as an ode of friendship to her college friend Raj Zacharias. A debutant actor, Vishvak Ravichandran had also shot for a few scenes in the film but his portions were halted due to budget constraints, and he then worked as an assistant director for the film upon the insistence of the producer. 111 The film was titled Kadavul Paathi Mirugam Paathi, after a song in Aalavandhan (2001).

== Music ==
Kadavul Paathi Mirugam Paathi

Soundtrack album by Rahul Raj
- Released: 21 June 2014
- Recorded: 2014
- Genre: Feature film soundtrack
- Length: 17:36
- Language: Tamil
- Label: Triple V Records
- Producer: Rahul Raj

Rahul Raj chronology
Mannar Mathai Speaking 2 (2014)	Kadavul Paathi Mirugam Paathi (2014)	Paathshala (2014)

All music is composed, arranged, programmed and produced by Rahul Raj, who makes his debut in Tamil cinema after impressive stints in Malayalam and Telugu film industries. The audio was released in a grand function held at Sathyam Cinemas, Chennai. Yugabharathi, Viveka and Karunakaran are the lyricists. Producer K. E. Gnanavel Raja was present during the occasion, along with several other dignitaries.

The soundtrack met with positive reviews on release. Karthik Srinivasan of Milliblog.com commented "The soundtrack’s highlight is Enadhu ulagil, that lays out its Reetigowlai cards right at the outset and goes on to make superb pop-style use of the raaga! Long overdue, good enough debut by Rahul Raj in Tamil." Vipin Nair of Musicaloud.com too rated the album high, and concluded saying "Commendable Tamil film debut from Malayali composer Rahul Raj. Naan Indru in particular is total chartbuster material!".

No.	Title	Singers	Length
1.	"Naan Indru Naan Thaana"	Sooraj Santhosh	4:03
2.	"Enadhu Ulagil"	Gayathri Suresh	4:04
3.	"Meenamma Meenamma"	Suchitra Karthik	3:53
4.	"Beast Rock"	Arjun Sasi, Rahul Raj	3:21
5.	"The Dark Theme"	Anna Katharine	2:15
Total length:			17:36
