= Rama Chakkani Seetha =

- Directed by: Sriharsha Manda
- Produced by: GL Phanikanth; Smt. Visalakshmi Manda
- Starring: Indhra; Priyadarshi; Sukrutha Wagle
- Cinematography: Sunny
- Edited by: Garry BH
- Music by: Kesava Kiran
- Release date: 29 July 2019
- Country: India
- Language: Telugu

Rama Chakkani Seetha (transl. Rama's suitable Seetha) is a 2019 Telugu-language romantic comedy film. It is directed by Sriharsha Manda and produced by GL Phani Kanth and Smt.Visalakshmi Manda. It stars Indhra, Priyadarshi and Sukrutha Wagle in the lead roles. This is also a Telugu debut movie of Sukrutha Wagle, who is known for her performance orientated roles in Kannada film industry.

== Plot ==
The movie revolves around Balu (Indhra), a happy-go-lucky boy who strongly believes in destiny and luck. He falls in love with Anu (Sukrutha Wagle) who is an accounting student who believes in hard work and perseverance. Both have contradictory life philosophies. Pushkar (Priyadarshi) who is Balu's childhood friend, helps him impress Anu by faking his identity as Siddhu and using a fake number. Gulabboo Govind (Rahul Sipligunj) tries to separate them as he also loves Anu. By the time Balu proposes Anu, she finds out that he cheated her and tested her character by using the different identity. Now, the rest of the story is all about how they cross their paths again in life.

== Cast ==
- Indhra as Balu
- Priyadarshi as Pushkar
- Sukrutha Wagle as Anu
- GL Phani Kanth
- Ravi Babu
- Y. Kasi Viswanath
- Rahul Sipligunj as Gulabboo Govind
- Madhumani
- Abhay
- Jabardast Appalarao

== Production ==
The film was shot in and around the city of Hyderabad, Vijayawada and Vizag.

== Release ==
Rama Chakkani Seetha was released across the States of Telangana and Andhra Pradesh on 27 September 2019. The movie was screened both in the multiplex and single screen theatres. Within 14 days of the release, Amazon Prime Video bought the digital rights of the movie.

== Reception ==
The film was well received by critics. The Times of India rated the movie 3/5 stars. Telugu Filmnagar wrote that the comedy scenes were the best part of the movie. It also highlighted the acting of Priyadarshi in comedy scenes and Sukrutha in the emotional and romantic scenes. 123telugu.com described the film as "passable", saying that many of its elements were too predictable.
