= Anand Ranga =

Indian film director

- Born: 23 May 1975 (age 50); Hyderabad, Andhra Pradesh, India
- Occupation: Film director
- Spouse: Sowmya Sharma

Anand Ranga is a film director who works in Telugu film Industry.

== Personal life and career ==
Anand Ranga was born and raised in Hyderabad. He graduated in computers and then went on to do Diploma in Film Technology, specializing in direction and screenplay writing from Film & Television Institute of Tamil Nadu, Chennai. He directed his debut Telugu feature film Oy! in 2009. He started a production house called Random Thoughts has produced two films DK Bose (2015) & Poga (2014).

Ranga is married to Telugu film dubbing artist Sowmya Sharma and lives in Hyderabad.

== Filmography ==
=== Director ===
- Oy! (2009)
- Shootout at Alair (2020) (series)
- Vyavastha (2023) (series- Zee5)

=== Additional screenplay, executive producer and songs director ===
- Kaadhali (2017)
