= Manasunu Maaya Seyake =

- Film poster
- Directed by: Suresh P Kumar
- Written by: Suresh P Kumar
- Starring: Sethu; Prince; Disha Pandey; Richa Panai
- Cinematography: Venkatahanuma
- Edited by: M. R. Varmaa
- Music by: Manikanth Kadri
- Production company: Full House Entertainment
- Release date: 24 January 2014
- Country: India
- Language: Telugu

Manasunu Maaya Seyake is a bilingual Indian film directed by Suresh P Kumar, starring Sethu, Prince, Disha Pandey and Richa Panai. The Telugu version of the film was released in January 2014, while the Tamil version, Manadhil Maayam Seidhai, remains unreleased.

== Cast ==
- Sethu as Jai
- Prince as Shiva
- Disha Pandey as Lasya
- Richa Panai as Mythili
- Manobala as Sundaram
- Vikram Singh as Rocky

== Soundtrack ==
The soundtrack of the film was composed by Manikanth Kadri, the son of the legendary saxophonist Kadri Gopalnath, who previously worked few Tamil and Telugu film. The film launch was held at Ramanaidu Studios in film nagar, Hyderabad on 27 March 2013.

No.	Title	Singer(s)	Length
1.	"Aakasama Neeko Salam"	Santosh Venky
2.	"Konnallu Kallalona"	Vijay Yesudas, Swetha Mohan
3.	"Premato Nenu Ninnu"	Haricharan, Hamsika Iyer
4.	"Puvvu Nee Vepu"	Palakkad Sriram
5.	"Premato Nenu Ninnu"	Santosh Venky, Saptaparna Chakraborthy
6.	"Aakasama Neeko Salam"	Santosh Venky

== Reception ==
The Telugu version of the film opened to mixed reviews with Y. Sunita Chowdhary from The Hindu noting "the plot is good but the director fails to narrate it interestingly", but concluding that it was a "good attempt". Raghava, a Telugu film critic at 123telugu.com, rated it as 2 out of 5 and noted "a poor first half, lack of entertainment and Tamil flavour spoil the viewing experience."
