= Quota (2020 film) =

- Release poster
- Directed by: P. Amudhavanan
- Written by: P. Amudhavanan
- Produced by: P. Amudhavanan
- Starring: Bhavaas; Niharika; Aadhil; Chella; Saji Subarna; Naresh Madeswar
- Cinematography: Gavaskarraju; P. Amudhavanan
- Edited by: Vinoth Sridhar
- Music by: Allen Sebastian
- Production company: Team A Ventures
- Distributed by: Collective Frames; Simply South Entertainment
- Release date: 20 November 2020
- Country: India
- Language: Tamil

Quota is a 2020 Indian Tamil-language film directed by P. Amudhavanan, produced by Team A Ventures, and starring Chella, Saji Subarna, Naresh Madeswar, Bhavass, and Niharika. The film tells the story of two underprivileged children who struggle to achieve their dreams.

== Plot ==
The plot revolves around a talented child from a tribal hamlet who yearns to become a gymnast. But, his economic condition and identity are a huge deterrent to his dream. Though the film begins with a tribute to the tribal freedom fighter and leader Birsa Munda, it does not focus on a particular caste or tribe. The spotlight is primarily on how children from underprivileged backgrounds continue to struggle to achieve their dreams, when it shouldn’t be so. Why can’t every talented child get his/her due?

It relates the situation faced by an ambitious, loyal and happy family in their daily walks of financially uncontrollable lifestyle. Adding much to the movement of the story, the pinching of the boys with an acute sense of humour lifts it to a different level. The difference in opportunities, opinions, judgements, reservations between the rich and poor forces him to challenge his talent which results in attaining the prejudice with his determination and hard work. The plot moves the experience with satire, more of pun, fun and frolic of its kind.

== Cast ==
- Aadhil as Sadukodu
- Bhavaas as Paari
- Chella as Manickam
- Naresh Madeswar as Moses
- Niharika as Amudha
- Saji Subarna as Selvi

== Music ==
The music for the film was composed by Allen Sebastian.

Track listing
No.	Title	Lyrics	Singer(s)	Length
1.	"Odu Odu"	Tamil Mani	Abishek	3:46
2.	"The Journey Of Kezhangu"	Sridevi	Siddharth S	1:58
3.	"Vaazhvenbadhae"	Sridevi	R. S. Rajprathap	1:42
4.	"Poraadu"	Sridevi	R. S. Rajprathap	1:12
5.	"Chinna Chittu"	Joseph Camillus	Mohan Srinivaash Jagatheeshan	4:00
Total length:				12:38

== Release ==
The Times of India opined that the film was "earnest but overly melodramatic". The New Indian Express opined that "It is quite tiring to keep reiterating that good intentions alone don’t make good cinema".
