= Ulidavaru Kandanthe (soundtrack) =

- Soundtrack cover

Soundtrack album by B. Ajaneesh Loknath
- Released: 7 March 2014
- Recorded: 2013
- Genre: Feature film soundtrack
- Length: 45:40
- Language: Kannada
- Label: Anand Audio
- Producer: B. Ajaneesh Loknath

B. Ajaneesh Loknath chronology
Varshadhare (2010)	Ulidavaru Kandanthe (2014)	RangiTaranga (2015)

Ulidavaru Kandanthe is the soundtrack album composed by B. Ajaneesh Loknath, for the 2014 film of the same name. The album features twelve tracks in number with four instrumentals and had lyrics written by Rakshit Shetty, Vigneshwar Vishwa, Suni, Yogaraj Bhat, Manojava Galgali. The album was released on 7 March 2014.

== Reception ==
Kavya Christopher of The Times of India reviewed the album, gave it a four star rating, and wrote, "The songs of Ulidavaru Kandante do not conform to idea of commercial hit numbers and that in itself sets them apart from the rest. They are absolutely local in the sense that they capture the situation and mood of the storyline or situation in the most rustic way possible." She concluded, "This is one music album that is a must-listen, again and again."

== Track listing ==
No.	Title	Lyrics	Artist(s)	Length
1.	"Theme of Ulidavaru Kandante"		Instrumental	3:39
2.	"Knock Knock"	Manojava Galgali, Vigneshwar Vishwa	C. R. Bobby	2:15
3.	"Richie's Theme"		Instrumental	3:58
4.	"Hulivesha Beats"		Instrumental	4:11
5.	"Kanna Muchhe"	Suni	Shankar Mahadevan, Vani Harikrishna	5:19
6.	"Male Marethu"	Vigneshwar Vishwa	Vijay Prakash	4:04
7.	"Gatiya Ilidu"	Rakshit Shetty	Vijay Prakash, B Ajaneesh Loknath	4:21
8.	"Paper Paper Medicine Paper"	Rakshit Shetty	B. R. Hrishikesh, Aditya Sunil Duth, Mallesh Hugar, Puttaraja Hugar, Gagan G. Gaonkar	3:31
9.	"Kaakig Banna Kantha"	Rakshit Shetty	Shreya Ghoshal	4:14
10.	"The Final Showdown"		Instrumental	4:06
11.	"Ulidavaru Kandante Promotional Track (Version 1)"	Yogaraj Bhat	Rakshit Shetty	4:00
12.	"Ulidavaru Kandante Promotional Track (Version 2)"	Suni	B. Ajaneesh Loknath, Rakshit Shetty	3:42
Total length:				45:40

== Other versions ==
Four of the songs were used in the film's Tamil remake Richie (2017), which was also composed by Ajaneesh.
