= Simpallag Innondh Love Story =

2016 Kannada romantic-comedy road film

Simpllag Innondh Love Story
- Film poster
- Directed by: Suni
- Written by: Suni
- Produced by: Ashu Bedra
- Starring: Praveen Tej; Meghana Gaonkar
- Cinematography: Darshan Kanaka
- Edited by: Sachin B. Ravi
- Music by: Bharath BJ
- Production company: Ashu Bedra Venture
- Distributed by: Horizon Studio Release
- Release date: 11 March 2016
- Running time: 142 minutes
- Country: India
- Language: Kannada

Simpllag Innondh Love Story is a 2016 Indian Kannada-language romantic-comedy road film written and directed by Suni and featuring stars Praveen Tej, Meghana Gaonkar. It is the spiritual successor of directors debut venture Simple Agi Ondh Love Story (2013). The plot revolves around a love story of two characters, with completely different personalities, who share a road journey.

== Plot ==
Kush, Kushi, and Push are born on the same day, at the same time and in the same hospital. While Kushi's father settles in Karwar, the families of Kush and Push end up as neighbors and run their traditional businesses.

Kushi completes her education in Bangalore and is ready to head back to Karwar. Push is now settled with a job, while Kush is a carefree person. Push's father wants him to marry Kushi, but Push rejects the proposal without even seeing her photo. The proposal then goes to Kush's father, who readily agrees without knowing the name or face of the girl.

After seeing Kushi's photo, Push regrets his decision. He gets Kush to withdraw his decision, by showing him a photo of a different person. He thereafter reverses his decision and agrees to marry Kushi.

Meanwhile, Kush leaves his house, with his sidekick Tube(aka Govinda), on a stolen test-drive car. He accidentally meets Kushi while she is waiting for a bus to Karwar. He introduces himself as a business tycoon going to Goa via Karwar and suggests her to accompany him, saying that there is a bus strike. She agrees as she is in a hurry to meet her father for a scheduled program.

What happens next is the crux of the story.

== Cast ==
- Praveen Tej as Kush
- Meghana Gaonkar as Kushi
- Master Hemanth as Govinda aka Tube
- Vijeth as Push
- Padmaja Rao as Parvathi, Kush's mother
- Mangalore Suresh as Kushi's father
- Chidanand as Car showroom manager
- Raksha Shenoy
- Ravi Bhat as Pranesh, Kush's father
- Shiva Manju as Govinda's father
- Shimoga Bhaskar as Push's father
- Sheelam M Swamy

== Soundtrack ==
Songs composed by Bharath BJ and released under label of Lahari Music.

Simple agi innond love story

Soundtrack album by Bharath B. J.
- Released: 18 February 2016
- Recorded: 2015
- Studio: Ashu Bedra Venture
- Genre: Feature film soundtrack
- Length: 27:11
- Label: Lahari Music

Bharath B. J. chronology
Plus (2015)	Simple agi innond love story (2016)	Beautiful Manasugalu (2017)

Tracklist

No.	Title	Lyrics	Singer(s)	Length
1.	"Sevanthige Chendinanthe"	Pramod Ganesh	Shashank Sheshagiri, Manasa Holla, Oscar Aloysus	4:15
2.	"Ellu Maarada Hridaya"	Simple Suni	Chethan Gandharva	4:30
3.	"Thusu Preethiya"	Siddhu Kodipura	Sonu Nigam, Palak Muchhal	4:52
4.	"Naane Bareda Nanna Kathege"	Simple Suni	Rajesh Krishnan, Anuradha Bhat	3: 10
5.	"Simpallag Innondh Love Story"	Pramod Ganesh	B J Bharath	3:14
6.	"Naane Bareda Nanna Kathege"	Simple Suni	Aravind, Anuradha Bhat	3:30
7.	"Ellu Maarada Hridaya (Remix)"	Simple Suni	Chethan Gandharva	4:40
