= Bharath B. J. =

Indian music composer, singer

- Born: Bangalore, India
- Occupations: Composer, Music Director, Singer
- Years active: 2010–present

Bharath B. J. is an Indian music producer, composer and singer, who works predominantly in Kannada cinema. Starting his career as a composer for the short film Simply Kailawesome in 2010, Bharath got his breakthrough in 2013 with the film Simple Agi Ondh Love Story.

== Career ==
Bharath's first work was for the short film Simply Kailawesome starring MG Srinivas and directed by MG Srinivas which was promoted well prior to its release. In 2013, Bharath bagged the project Simple Agi Ondh Love Story which turned out to be a huge success upon its release; debutant director Suni, actors Rakshit Shetty and Shwetha Srivatsav along with Bharath; garnered popularity through the film. It was followed by another successful soundtrack for the film Bahuparak (2014) which was also directed by Suni. In 2016, he was signed in to compose for the sequel film Simple Agi Innond Love Story. Apart from this, he recorded his voice for the song "Hey Who Are You" for the successful film Kirik Party (2016), which had music composition by B. Ajaneesh Loknath.

In 2018, Bharath was adjudged the Best Music Director at the Filmfare Awards South for the successful film Beautiful Manasugalu (2017).

He won the Filmfare Award for Best Music Director for the film Beautiful Manasugalu. Apart from composing music, Bharath has recorded his voice for songs, notably the "Hey Who Are You" song from the film Kirik Party (2016).

== Discography ==
Year	Film	Notes
2010	Simply Kailawesome	Short film
2013	Simple Agi Ondh Love Story	Nominated - Filmfare Award for Best Music Director - Kannada
2014	Bahuparak	
2015	Plus	
2016	Simpallag Innondh Love Story	
2016	1/2 Mentlu	
2016	Kirik Party	Singer of the song "Hey Who Are You"
2017	Beautiful Manasugalu	Won - Filmfare Award for Best Music Director - Kannada
2018	April Na Himabindu	
2018	Onthara Bannagalu	
2018	Yogi Duniya	
2018	Vanilla	
2018	Swartharatna	
2019	Striker	
2019	Yaarige Yaaruntu	
2022	Wheelchair Romeo	

== Awards and nominations ==
Filmfare Awards South

- 2017: Best Music Director: Beautiful Manasugalu
