= Praveen Tej =

Indian Kannada actor, television presenter

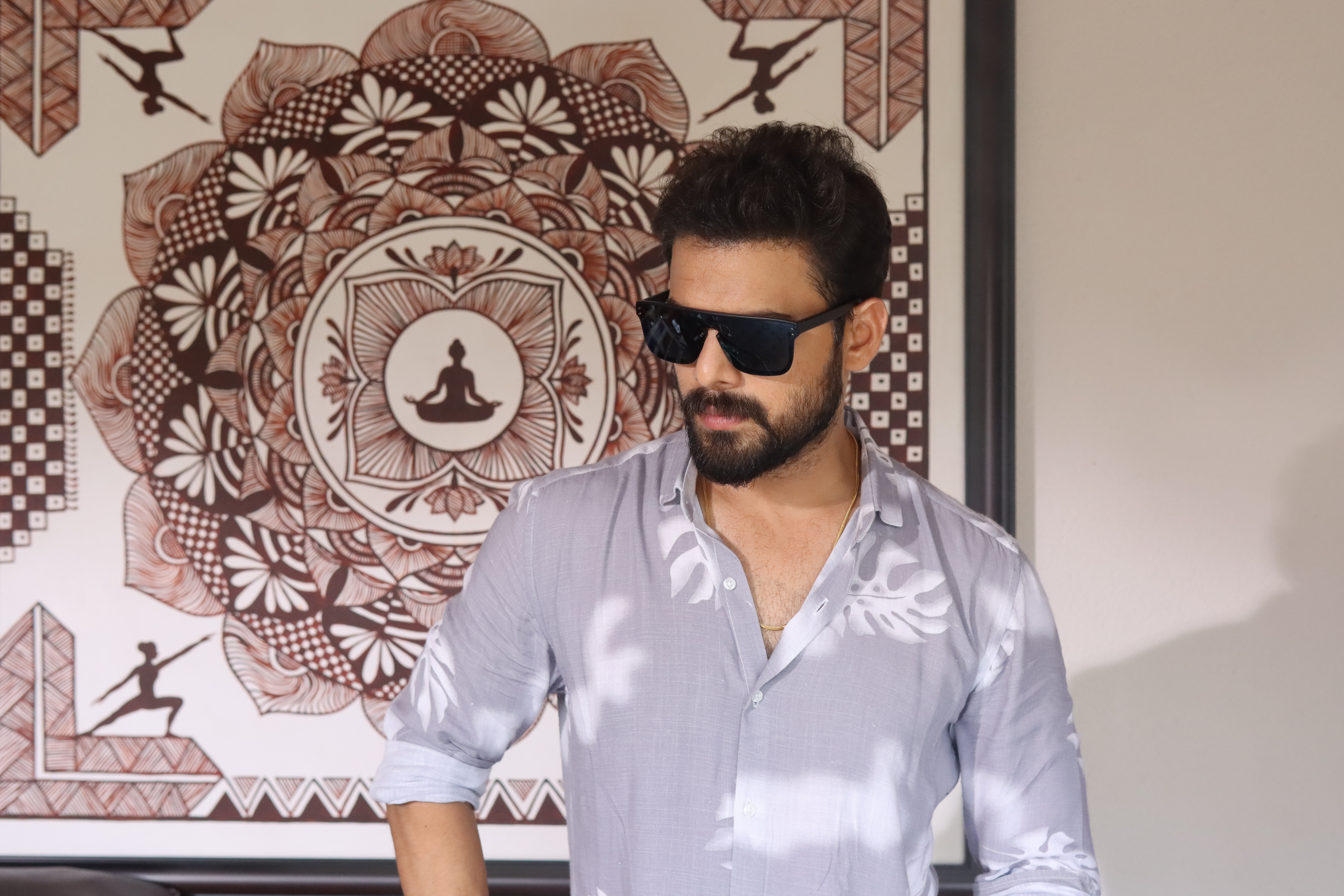
- Born: 3 December 1984 (age 41); Hosanagara, Shimoga district, Karnataka India
- Occupation: Actor
- Years active: 2009 - Present
- Spouse: Deepika Nazre (m. 2014)

Praveen Tejas is an Indian film and television actor, known for his works in Kannada. Praveen made his feature film debut in Kannada film industry with Jolly Days (2009). He is known for his performance in Simpallag Innondh Love Story (2016) and Mundina Nildana (2019).

== Early life ==
Praveen Tej was born on 3 December 1984 in Hosanagara, Shimoga district to Lakshmana Gowda and Padmavathi.

== Career ==
He made his debut in the Kannada film industry with movie Jolly Days (2009), where he played one of the lead roles, Praveena. He was later part of a Kannada reality show aired on Suvarna TV, Pyate Mandi Kadige Bandru (2011).

He acted television series, Radha Kalyana (2012) was aired Zee Kannada.

Praveen later starred in film Aantharya as Krishna (2013) directed by Anney Santhosh Gowda. He played the role of Kush in the film Simpallag Innondh Love Story (2016), a sequel of Kannada hit Simple Agi Ondh Love Story. His other films 5G (2017), Kuchiku Kuchiku (2018).

His next movie was the crime thriller Churikatte in 2018. He acted in the film Striker (2019). His next movie, Mundina Nildana (2019) was a hit.

== Personal life ==
Praveen married Deepika Nazre in 2014 and has a son.

== Filmography ==
	Movie	Role	Notes
2009	Jolly Days	Praveen	
2013	Aantharya	Krishna	
2016	Simpallag Innondh Love Story	Kush	
2017	5G	Jai	
2018	Kuchiku Kuchiku	Datta	
2018	Churikatte	Adi	
2018	Heegondhu Dina		
2019	Striker	Siddhu	
2019	Mundina Nildana	Partha	
2023	Hondisi Bareyiri	Jagan	
2024	O2	Dev	
2025	Jambu Circus	Akash	
2026	BMW	TBA	Post production

=== Television ===
	Title	Role	Notes
2011	Pyate Mandi Kadige Bandru	Self	Reality Show
2014	Radha Kalyana	Vishal	Tele Series
2025	Maarigallu		Web series
