= Idi Naa Love Story =

- Directed by: Ramesh Gopi
- Written by: Simple Suni
- Based on: Simple Agi Ondh Love Story by Suni
- Produced by: SV Prakash
- Starring: Tarun; Oviya
- Cinematography: Christopher Joseph
- Music by: Srinath Vijay
- Production company: Ram Entertainments
- Release date: 14 February 2018
- Running time: 131 minutes
- Country: India
- Language: Telugu

Idi Naa Love Story (transl. This is my love story) is a 2018 Telugu language romance film, produced by Prakash SV, starring Tarun and Oviya in the lead roles. The film is a remake of the 2013 Kannada film, Simple Agi Ondh Love Story starring Rakshit Shetty and Shwetha Srivatsav.

== Plot ==
The story is about a man named Abhiram "Abhi", who lives a carefree life and his experiences with women and his quest to fall in love and make a woman his. He is impulsive, happy go lucky, romantic and idealistic without any future plans. He is a person with child like mentality who often makes instantaneous decisions. He sees a woman named sruthi while riding his motorbike and tries to talk to her. Reluctant to speak with him, she tries to avoid him. He stalks Sruthi for many weeks following her wherever she goes upon which she agrees to talk with him. He forms a romantic relationship with her. Things go well up to a point at which she has a marriage proposal from another person arranged by her family. Nervous about this, she tries to approach him over phone and in person. He doesn't give her any time to talk and behaves carelessly towards her misjudging her intent and her relationship with him in that situation. This pushes her away from him and she becomes engaged to another person. She later meets him to reconcile with him and he recognizes a ring on her finger which indicates she is about to get married with another person. Unable to blame himself because of his madness, he accepts that she wouldn't be his. Sruthi and Abhi agree to be courteous towards each other even though they won't be together.

After he lands a job in an advertising company, he meets another woman Abhinaya who seems friendly with him. After spending a few hours with her both exchange stories about their previous love life, he immediately falls in love with her and she fall in love with him. After meeting each other at night, both begin to have sexual contact. When the night is over, she wakes up and calls the police saying that he tried to rape her after which the police arrest him and put him in jail. Later, it is learnt by the police that the woman has amnesia in which she can't remember anything beyond the current day since her Automotive accident which happened a few years ago. The only memories she has are those before her automotive accident. The police realizing her mental illness, release Abhi who tries to talk to her making her remember the time they spent together.

== Cast ==
- Tarun as Abhiram "Abhi"
- Oviya as Abhinaya
- Khayyum as Ravi, Abhiram's friend
- Ashok Kumar
- Chitti Babu
- Jagadish
- Pushpa
- Niharika
- Murali
- Hari
- Munna
- Vijay
- Anil
- Kiran
- Yashvanth
- Chandini
- Pavihra
- Priyanka
- Manchu Manoj (cameo appearance)

== Soundtrack ==
The film's soundtrack was composed by first-timer Srinath Vijay.

Idi Naa Love Story

Soundtrack album by Srinath Vijay
- Released: 2018
- Recorded: 2016–17
- Genre: Feature film soundtrack
- Length: 20:10
- Label: Mango Music

No.	Title	Singer(s)	Length
1.	"Ye Nimishamlo"	Karthik	04:35
2.	"Ee Waiting"	Shakthi Sree Gopalan	03:14
3.	"Ooh La Laa"	Ranjith Govind	03:38
4.	"Aa Dhevude"	Vijay Prakash, Padhma Latha	03:17
5.	"Yedho Yedho"	Naresh Iyer, Priya Himesh	03:14
6.	"Naa Hrudhayam Lo"	Abhay Jodhpurkar	02:12
Total length:			20:10

== Release ==
The film released on 14 February 2018.

== Reception ==
=== Critical response ===
A reviewer from Sakshi.com wrote "However.. Rashaku did not focus on such things at all. Not even a single scene could be made interesting in the two-hour movie. Another major drawback of the movie is the dialogues. Unnecessarily inserted punch delay is annoying in most cases when it doesn't explode at all [sic]". Murali Krishna from The New Indian Express Says "Enough said, Idi Naa Love Story is bland and evokes no emotion, romance other than exasperation of having to watch it for two hours and 12 minutes. Watch at your own risk as it may destroy your love for love stories!". A critic from Samayam wrote "The background music doesn't seem to matter. Cinematography work is good. Some locations are shown beautifully. Editing work is good. It has to be said that there have been no movies with such a weak love story in recent times. Finally, on Valentine's Day, this love story went awry".
