= Bahuparak =

- Directed by: Simple Suni
- Written by: Simple Suni
- Screenplay by: Simple Suni
- Story by: Simple Suni
- Produced by: Hemanth, Suresh Bhairasandra
- Starring: Srinagar Kitty; Meghana Raj
- Cinematography: Manohar Joshi
- Edited by: Sachin B. Ravi
- Music by: Bharath B. J.
- Production company: Suvin Cinemas
- Release date: 25 July 2014
- Country: India
- Language: Kannada

Bahuparak is a 2014 Indian Kannada language drama film written, directed and co-produced by Simple Suni. The movie was released in the month of July 2014. The film features Srinagar Kitty and Meghana Raj in the lead roles. This film marks the 25th venture for the actor Srinagar Kitty.

The film commenced its shooting in July 2013 and released its first trailer soon after the shooting began. Mahohar Joshi is the cinematographer and Bharath B. J., who also composed the music for the movie Simple Agi Ondh Love Story, has composed the score for this film as well.

== Plot ==
The movie opens with a call for a play titled 'Bahuparak'. The play opens with a character, which is portrayed by well known thinker and stand up comedian Richard Louis, expounding tenets of life and the principles of Karma. The story moves into a scene where the three main characters namely Manas, Mani, and Mauni, all played by Srinagar Kitty are introduced and each one starts narrating their life experiences.

Manas kicks off the story where he is shown as a handsome hunk who is on his way to meet the love of his life. However, his joy soon turns into gloom when he learns of a tragic news. The story, now being told in three distinct tracks, switches to the point where Mani is introduced. Mani is found unconscious on the road. He meets a friend named Mohan, who takes him in and helps him to etch out a living. However, Mani fails to make a living in the mainstream way, and he and Mohan soon take the shortcut and start robbing unsuspecting people, which soon enough to their bad luck ends in a murder. They are picked up by the police, where an inspector offers them a choice. Either go to jail for a long time or take the blame for a murder they didn't commit, and get out on bail. Mani and Mohan accept the offer.

The story then moves to a village, somewhere in North Karnataka. Mauni, a limping middle aged aspiring politician is frustrated because the person he helped to win an election has deserted him. To further exacerbate his feelings, he suffers a humiliating defeat in the next election. At this point, one of his friend's, also acting as his trusted adviser, leads Mauni to adopt the tried and tested method to win an election i.e. through money and muscle power.

The story ever revolving around Manas, Mani, and Mauni switches back to Manas, where it is revealed that his childhood friend Sneha played by Meghana Raj has stepped into his life. Just when Manas decides to propose Sneha, her twin sister, Preethi, enters their lives causing further turmoil in Manas's life.

Meanwhile, Mani, now slowly making his way as a big rowdy, soon establishes himself as a strong underworld don. Whereas Mauni reaches the highest echelons of power, however, his greed for power soon reaches unfathomable positions.

The story takes a critical turn at the point where, Manas, caught in the love triangle between Sneha and Preethi. Mani, caught in the cross fire of becoming the biggest don in the country. Mauni, who wants to become a top notch politician.

Will Manas come out unscathed? Will Mani reach his goal of becoming the biggest don? Will Mauni be able to quench his insatiable thirst for power? But, above all of this, who is Manas, Mani, and Mauni?. How their lives are linked forms the rest of the story.

== Cast ==
- Srinagar Kitty as Manas / Mani / Mouni (Triple roles)
- Meghana Raj as Sneha / Preethi (Dual roles)
- Naveen Sagar as Virus
- Manasa Rao as Samanvaya
- Sukrutha Wagle as Prathibimba
- Sundar Raj
- Pramila Joshai
- Vijeth as Mohana
- Naveen Shankar as a salesman
- Rakshit Shetty in guest appearance as Richie
- Pramod Shetty in guest appearance
- Arun Prakash Shetty in guest appearance
- Pawan Wadeyar in guest appearance as Director Pawan
- Bhavana Rao (Special appearance)

== Production ==
Bahuparak features Kitty in three different roles spanning three different generations. The film began the shoot in a 73-year-old house in North Karnataka. The film dialogues are written by one of the leading Kannada daily journalist, Hari.

== Soundtrack ==
The soundtrack for the film was composed by Bharath B. J., making his second successive collaboration with the director Suni after Simple Agi Ondh Love Story. While the major part of the songs are penned by director Suni himself, the soundtrack also features a popular folk song written by Shishunala Sharif. The soundtrack consists of 10 songs.

Bahuparak

Soundtrack album by Bharath B. J.
- Released: 10 June 2014
- Genre: Feature film soundtrack
- Length: 39:30
- Label: Anand Audio

=== Track list ===
#	Title	Singer(s)	Lyricist
1	"Sooryana Benkiya"	Bharath B. J.	Vigneshwar Vishwa
2	"Usiraaguve"	Rajesh Krishnan, Anuradha Bhat	Suni
3	"Sneha Embudu"	KK	Suni
4	"Devaniruvanu"	Bharath B. J.	Suni
5	"Naanarembudu Naanalla"	Bharath B. J., Kaushik Aithal, Chaitanya Bhat	Shishunala Sharif
6	"Bazaaru Bhari"	Sparsha	Suni
7	"Usiraaguve" (remix)	Bharath B. J., Vidyashree, Shwetha	Suni
8	"Simple Preeti"	Srinagar Kitty, Meghana Raj	Suni
9	"Gedde Geltheeni"	Naveen Sajju	P. Lankesh
10	"Bahuparak Theme"	Bharath B. J.	Suni

== Release ==
The film was released on 25 July 2014 across Karnataka. Majestic, known as the heart of Kannada Cinema theaters, featured this movie in the renovated Menaka theater.

== Reception ==
The movie has received mixed to positive reviews. The three track storytelling style has been hailed as an experiment hitherto unknown in the Kannada Industry. Suni's style of narration, dialogues, and songs especially the melodious "Usiraaguve" track has heads swaying.
