= Half Mentlu =

Indian Kannada-language romantic drama film

- Official poster
- Directed by: Lakshmi Dinesh
- Produced by: Shashi Kumar
- Starring: Sandeepa; Sonu Gowda
- Cinematography: Ravi
- Music by: Bharath B. J.
- Release date: 1 April 2016
- Country: India
- Language: Kannada

Half Mentlu (Note: Mentlu is how Indians colloquially refer to a mental person.) is a 2016 Indian Kannada-language romantic drama directed by Lakshmi Dinesh, starring newcomer Sandeepa and Sonu Gowda. The plot is based on a real incident that took place in Ramanagara in 2010, with characters inspired by real people. The film was delayed and released in 2016 after being shelved since 2013.

== Cast ==
- Sandeepa as Shiva a.k.a. Shivu
- Sonu Gowda as Madhu
- Achyuth Kumar
- Tabla Nani
- Mico Nagaraj
- Lakshmi Devamma
- Srinivas Gowda
- Mohan Juneja

== Production ==
Assistant director Sandeepa, who played a small role in Googly (2013), gave up his government job to play the lead role in this film. Sandeepa was not to play the lead role but the director liked his mannerisms and chose him. The film was shot near Nandini Layout. Shooting was completed in 2013.

== Soundtrack ==
Music by Bharath B. J. The song "Jeeva Haani Aagomunna" is not a part of the soundtrack album.

All lyrics are written by Lakshmi Dinesh

No.	Title	Singer(s)	Length
1.	"Haadi Beedili Ninthu"	Vijay Prakash	4:34
2.	"Jeeva Haani Aagomunna"	Asith Tripati	4:55
3.	"Alemariyagi"	Prem	5:20
4.	"Godemele Ninna Hesara"	Shreya Ghoshal	4:51
5.	"Pullu Pullu Pulinga"	Mangalamukhi - Shama, Mangalamukhi - Kushi, Group	3:42
6.	"Marammana Edurali"	Naveen Sajju	4:43
7.	"Godemele Ninna Hesara"	Bharath BJ	4:51
8.	"Theme - Instrumental"	-	2:17
9.	"Haadi Beedili Ninthu - Remix"	Vijay Prakash	3:48

== Release and reception ==
The release of the film was delayed after the Censor Board's refusal to give films CBFC certificates. The producer of the film attempted suicide after he was unable to release the film.

Archana Nathan of The Hindu opined that "Half Mentalu, with its half-baked plot and misunderstood idea of love drives you mad, for sure". Sunayana Suresh of The Times of India criticised Sandeepa's dialogue delivery but wrote that "The biggest highlight of the film are Bharath BJ's tunes. These come as much-needed respite between the confused narrative". G. S. Kumar of Filmfare gave a similar review and criticised Sandeepa's acting and stated that "The only good part in this movie is its music, composed by B J Bharath". Shashiprasad S. M. of Deccan Chronicle wrote that "there could not have been a more appropriate name for a film that highlights its shoddy making and the sad plight of the unknowing audience who watched a bit too much of it".
