= April Na Himabindu =

Indian Kannada-language family drama film

- Theatrical release poster
- Directed by: Shiv - Jagan
- Written by: Shiv - Jagan
- Produced by: M Jagadeesh
- Starring: H. G. Dattatreya; K. S. Shridar; Baabu Hirannaiah
- Cinematography: Manjunath B. Nayak
- Edited by: Loki - Suri
- Music by: Bharath B. J.
- Production company: Shiv Jagan Associates
- Release date: 6 October 2017
- Country: India
- Language: Kannada

April Na Himabindu (transl. Snowflake in April) is a 2017 Indian Kannada-language family drama film directed by the director duo Shiv-Jagan and starring H. G. Dattatreya, K. S. Shridar and Baabu Hirannaiah.

== Cast ==
- H. G. Dattatreya as Srikanta
- K. S. Shridar as Vishwanath
- Baabu Hirannaiah as Dr. Harish
- T. V. Gurumurthy as Venkoba
- Sachin Thimmaiah as Kitty
- Spandana Prasad as Rekha
- Baby Eeksha as Eeksha
- Chidanand V. as Lucky
- Pushpaswamy as Lucky's mother
- Shantala (Shwetha Srinivas) as Sahana
- Baby Milana as Lucky's daughter
- Ganesh Muthanna as Deepu
- Chandana Raghavendra as Varsha
- H. G. Somashekar Rao as Markandaiah
- Vijayalakshmi as Savithri

== Production ==
Pals for over a decade, a common interest in theatre and arts drove the director duo Shiv-Jagan to make a film about living each moment to the fullest, which, in most cases, people tend to forget, as they chase their dreams and aspire for material pleasures. The film was announced as an anthology of multiple stories that occur in the lives of people across different generations. As such, it takes a look at their lives, how different they are and how each deals with various circumstance. The title of the movie was suggested by Dattatreya. Dattatreya - a bachelor in real life, played a married man on-screen whereas Baabu Hirannaiah - a family man in real life played a bachelor in the movie.

== Soundtrack ==
Bharath B. J. has composed the songs for the movie. The title track was written by Yograj Bhat. "Avalinda Naavella" is about the importance of the women in our life and was written by V. Nagendra Prasad. The song "Ishtu Kaala Ottigiddu" originally composed by C. Ashwath, written by H. S. Venkateshamurthy and sung by Puttur Narasimha Nayak has been reused in this movie.

- "April Na Himabindu" - Raghu Dixit
- "Avalinda Naavella" - Vijay Prakash
- "Ishtu Kaala Ottigiddu" - Sangeetha Katti Kulkarni, Bharath B. J.

== Reception ==
A critic from The Times of India rated the film 2.5/5 stars and criticized the movie for its writing and said "What could have been a lovely tale mixing the lives of an older trio of friends with a younger one ends up being confused and rushed. While the concept and idea is nice, the fact that they want to narrate too many tales and tackle too many problems in very little screen time makes it a messy potpourri." The movie however was praised by a critic of Vijaya Karnataka who gave the film the same rating for blending the mindset of 2 generations - portraying the real-life struggles of just married younger generation and the way the elder generation looks back at life and accept the mistakes they did when they were young.
