= Ulidavaru Kandanthe =

2014 Kannada anthology film by Rakshit Shetty

- Theatrical release poster
- Directed by: Rakshit Shetty
- Written by: Rakshit Shetty
- Produced by: Hemanth; Suni; Abhi
- Starring: Rakshit Shetty; Kishore; Tara; Sheethal Shetty; Rishab Shetty; Achyuth Kumar; Yagna Shetty
- Cinematography: Karm Chawla
- Edited by: Sachin B. Ravi
- Music by: B. Ajaneesh Loknath
- Production company: Suvin Cinemas
- Release date: 28 March 2014
- Running time: 154 minutes
- Country: India
- Language: Kannada
- Budget: ₹3.84 crore (US$410,000)

Ulidavaru Kandante ( transl. As Seen by the Rest) is a 2014 Indian Kannada-language neo-noir gangster film written and directed by debutant Rakshit Shetty. Shetty appears in the lead role, along with Kishore, Tara, Achyuth Kumar, Rishab Shetty, and Yagna Shetty playing supporting roles. The film revolves around five stories connected to an incident of a person's murder, with each character narrating it in his own perspective.

The film was geared up to be sent to the Cannes Film Festival, and released on 28 March 2014, to generally positive reviews from film critics who acclaimed the direction, performances of Rakshit Shetty and Sheetal Shetty, and cinematography. The film was the first in Kannada to be shot entirely in sync sound technology. It was praised for its regional authenticity in depicting Tulu Nadu and its people. However, it turned out to be a box-office bomb on its release but later attained a cult following.

It has since been established as a cult classic in Kannada cinema, and had become a part of the modern new wave cinema that was kickstarted by Lucia (2013). It was dubbed in Hindi as Balwaan Badshah and remade in Tamil as Richie (2017), starring Malayalam actor Nivin Pauly.

== Synopsis ==
Malpe is a small fishing town on the Arabian Sea Coast, located 6 km to the west of the temple city, Udupi. Malpe's beaches are washed clean every day by the sea. The waves ensure that nothing gets left behind on the sand. But the waves cannot reach everything.

It is the time of the year when Udupi and its surroundings are decked up to celebrate Krishna Janmashtami. Men and children walk the streets dressed as characters from ancient Indian history. Teams painted as tigers are seen dancing to drum beats all around the town. But violence seems to be brewing in Malpe this Krishna Janmashtami. The movie revolves around five different people narrating their view of a murder incident that took place during Krishna Janmashtami.

== Plot ==
Regina is a young investigative journalist, who is working on a story, which cannot be written as a single piece. The story has several perspectives from the various characters involved and hence must be preserved as they are. In a flashback scene, a young boy Richard Anthony aka Richi is trying to outrun cops who are there to arrest him for murder. Regina remembers seeing this from the backseat of a car and it is established that both were childhood friends. Regina starts investigating the story by questioning various characters who were involved.

=== Chapter 1 ===
Voice of Silence – The first person she approaches is a local cashewnut merchant, Shailesha who knows both Richi and his childhood friend Raghu. Richi had been in a remand home for 8 years and Raghu had escaped to Bombay to work in a hotel and later with a local gang. Shailesha accidentally comes across Raghu during one of his Bombay trips. The two meet up in Bombay harbour where Shailesha tells Raghu that his father is no more and his mother is making a living by selling fish at the local market. Raghu tells him he cannot leave Bombay as he knows many secrets of his employer. He plans to relocate to Dubai with his mother, once he has sorted out the necessary funds.

To do this, Raghu steals a red bag which was important for a 'deal' between the Bombay party and an interested party in the US. He fights his way through the gang's henchmen and escapes to Malpe where Shailesha provides him with a safe house. Raghu realizes that his location is compromised as two armed gangsters approach his house and start knocking at the front door. As Raghu steeled himself for the impending gunfight, the knocking stopped, and the men left.

=== Chapter 2 ===
Richard Antony alias Richi – The second narrative comes from a close ally of Richi, Dinesha, who is held in lock-up. Richi is a brash and flamboyant young man who carries out dirty work for a local gangster-cum-businessman, Shankar Poojary. Poojary has links with the Bombay underworld and runs several fishing boats in Malpe. Richi has earned a bad reputation for himself and is a disgrace to his father, a priest in the local church.

Poojary summons Richi and Dinesha to his estate and tasks him to find Balu, one of his employees to 'teach him a lesson. Poojary asks Richi not to overdo it by 'losing control'. The annual Janmashtami festival in Udupi is in full swing as Richi and the gang arrive at Jodu Raste. Balu has painted himself as a tiger and is participating in Huli-vesha (tiger dance). Richi knocks out Balu and has him sent to the harbor. However, he takes a detour when he hears that Raghu is back in town and needs a visit.

It is revealed that Richi and Dinesha were the armed gangsters who were looking for Raghu in the previous story. Richi forces his way into the house and goes about explaining the made-up story of a Cuban boy (Tony Montana from the film Scarface) and a boy from Mandva (Vijay Chauhan from the movie Agneepath), and how a person at the receiving end of a beating often doesn't realize why he is being served this. This story doubles as a threat to Raghu and also as a metaphor for the viewers who are kept in the dark as the violent story unfolds. Richi finds the red bag that Raghu had stolen from the Bombay gang and asks the latter to join him for a boat ride. Raghu reluctantly agrees to say that he has to join his mother for dinner later in the day.

Once on the fishing boat, Richi is torturing Balu and forcing a confession out of him. Eventually, Richi pulls out a gun on Balu who by now is a broken man, and fires a shot. It would seem that Balu is no more.

=== Chapter 3 ===
Fish Curry – Raghu's mother Ratnakka makes a living out of selling fish in Malpe. After the death of her husband, her life is of struggle. Raghu visits his mother at his childhood house and tells her that he wishes to move permanently to Dubai along with her. However, he has to leave immediately and will return to pick her up once her documents are in order. He agrees to visit her the next day for dinner where she will prepare her signature dish Meen-saru (fish curry). The next day, a gleeful Ratnakka is shopping for fish in the local market, where she lets her fellow fisherwomen know that she is leaving for Dubai soon. That evening Ratnakka elaborately prepares the fish curry and waits for her son to arrive. Her joy turns to disappointment as the hours go by and she slowly starts to realize that her son may not return.

=== Chapter 4 ===
Whispers in the Wind – Munna has a soft corner for Balu's sister Sharada, who sells fish. He often roams around the fish market in hopes of getting a glimpse of her. He also tries to woo her with the help of a young lad, aptly known as Democracy. Munna works as a repairman for Shankar Poojary's boats. During the routine inspection of a fishing boat that Richi had used for his earlier adventure, Munna discovers an empty shell casing on the deck. Having the knowledge that Balu was previously seen with Richi at the harbor, Munna concludes that Balu has been murdered by Richi and his gang.

=== Chapter 5 ===
Ka – Balu is in a ragged state when Regina approaches him for questioning. Balu has developed a prejudice for crows and starts to pelt stones at them whenever he sees one. During one of his fishing trips, he catches a heavy log of wood in the fishing net. Balu decides to keep this to himself and soon discovers that the log actually contains a priceless relic which glows like gold.

Balu tries to make a profit out of this by selling the merchandise to a foreign party through a Bombay-based middleman. The middleman is not able to make full payment as the merchandise has been misplaced and a deal cannot be finalized. As the Janmashtami festival approaches Balu has himself painted as a tiger for Pili-vesha and is performing at Jod raste. Richi and the gang knock him out and take him on a fishing boat to force a confession. During the interrogation, Richi pulls out a gun and it is revealed that the shot was fired at Raghu. During his childhood, Richi had committed a hot-blooded murder trying to protect Raghu, after which the latter escaped to Bombay leaving Richi behind to be arrested. Richi has deep bitterness against Raghu for his betrayal because of which he spent 8 years in a remand home.

On opening the red bag, it is revealed that it contains the merchandise which Balu was trying to sell off and Raghu is the middleman, who stole the item before the deal could go through. He was planning to sell it in Dubai in order to secure a life for himself and his mother.

=== Final chapter ===
Reasons – Richi returns to Malpe where he is celebrating with Poojary and the tigers from Pili-vesha. Munna believes Balu was killed by Richi's gang and is now blinded by hatred for Richi and compassion for Sharada. Finding the right opportunity, Munna pulls out Dinesha's gun and shoots down Richi who in his dying moments is unaware of Munna's motive. The irony is clearly seen now that Richi becomes a victim of his own story of The Cuban boy and boy from Mandva. Dinesha returns the favor by killing Munna, who in his dying moments finds peace in the fact that he has avenged Sharada.

It is now clear that Regina was investigating the triple murders of Richi, Munna, and Raghu. She concludes that the story has many facets and cannot be clubbed into a single narrative and hence decides to name the story, Ulidavaru Kandante (As Seen by the Rest).

== Cast ==
- Rakshit Shetty as Richard Anthony aka "Richi"
- Kishore as Munna
- Tara as Ratnakka
- Achyuth Kumar (credited as Achyuth Rao) as Balu
- Rishab Shetty as Raghu
- Sheetal Shetty as Regina
- Yagna Shetty as Sharada
- Dinesh Mangalore as Shankar Poojary
- B. Suresha as Richi's father
- Pramod Shetty as Dinesha
- Raghu Pandeshwar as Shailesha
- Arun Prakash Shetty as Sudhi
- Master Sohan as Democracy (Satisha)
- Gaurish Akki
- Master Akshay
- Master Lohith
- Baby Kavya
- Chandrakala Rao

== Production ==
In an interview during the production of Ulidavaru Kandante, Rakshit Shetty said, "For UK, I want to create an experience that would last for generations to come. I will be more than happy if my movie keeps running in people’s hearts."

=== Development ===
The production of Ulidavaru Kandanthe was started on 1 August 2013.

== Marketing ==
The trailer of the movie was published on YouTube on 6 December 2013. It garnered 44,618 views within 48 hours of its launch, breaking the previous record for a Kannada film trailer set by Simple Agi Ondh Love Story. The trailer was also released in theatres by Kannada actor Puneeth Rajkumar, at the Triveni theatre, Bangalore the next day. Loose Maada Yogesh said he is ready to postpone his next movie for Ulidavaru Kandante.

The film maintains a presence on Facebook and Twitter, where they solicit memes and invite users to take turns at guessing the nature of the film's MacGuffin. Director Rakshit Shetty, busied himself after the release of the trailer, in the design of customisable T-shirts to promote the movie, and also as a vehicle to bring out more popular dialogues to build public anticipation and the fan-base prior to release. This was motivated by the favourable response to scenes depicted in the trailer, as well as some of the lines delivered by the characters.

The team also plan to release video screensavers and curate blog posts of the audience's reactions after release. Shetty explains that this social engagement – inviting viewer and fan perspectives on the subject – is a natural extension of the thematic subject of the film itself.

Sify.com reports Ulidavaru Kandante as a "wave of freshness".

== Theme ==
In an interactive session, Rakshit Shetty said he developed the story of the film with reference to Pancha Bhoota. He also stated that he not only wanted to narrate the story of the characters but also wanted to portray life also Udupi in the 90s. Even though the commercial elements of a successful cinema are there in the film, it was truthful to Karnataka culture. Rakshit Shetty also stated that he was inspired by Quentin Tarantino's Pulp Fiction for making the film. But he did not westernise the script. Being truthful to Karnataka culture is the speciality of this film.

The movie employs Akira Kurosawa's Rashomon Effect in the narration and story telling pattern.

== Release and reception ==
The film was given the "U/A" (Parental Guidance) certificate by the Regional Censor Board. The scene that was censored was that of a cockfight sequence and the use of abusive words muted. Apart from this, the number of smoking scenes were asked to be cut down. Following this, the film was released on 28 March 2014, in over 100 theatres across Karnataka, simultaneously releasing in theatres in the United States, and New Zealand.

=== Screenings ===
The film was screened in June 2014 at the London Indian Film Festival (LIFF) where it received positive response from the audience, and it was called one of the best Indian films to have been made at the time. LIFF rated the film calling it a "dazzling epic". The film was screened in Leverkusen, Germany on 18 May 2014. It was announced in August 2014 that the film would be screened at the Fantastic Fest in Austin, Texas in September 2014.

=== Critical reception ===
Upon release, the film received positive to mixed reviews from critics. Shyam Prasad S. of the Bangalore Mirror reviewed the film and drew comparisons to Akira Kurosawa's Rashomon (1950), which has a similar plot. He added, "The film strives hard to become a 'cult' film, but it falls short somewhere during its journey." He, however, praised the role of direction and acting departments in the film and appreciated the director for brilliantly capturing the culture of Mangalore and the surrounding areas. B. S. Srivani of Deccan Herald rated the film 3/5 and praised the cinematography, music and writes about the "fine effort by a debutant [director]."

== Awards ==
Award	Category	Recipient	Result	Ref
Karnataka State Film Awards	Best Debutant Director	Rakshit Shetty	Won	
Karnataka State Film Awards	Best Music Director	B. Ajaneesh Loknath	Won	
Filmfare Awards South	Best Director	Rakshit Shetty	Won	
Filmfare Awards South	Best Music Director	B. Ajaneesh Loknath	Won	
Filmfare Awards South	Best Male Playback Singer	Vijay Prakash ("Gatiya Ilidu")	Won	
Filmfare Awards South	Best Film	Hemanth, Suni, Abhi	Nominated	
Filmfare Awards South	Best Actor	Rakshit Shetty	Nominated	
Filmfare Awards South	Best Supporting Actor	Kishore	Nominated	
Filmfare Awards South	Best Lyricist	Rakshit Shetty	Nominated	
Filmfare Awards South	Best Female Playback Singer	Shreya Ghoshal	Nominated	
South Indian International Movie Awards	Best Cinematographer	Karm Chawla	Nominated	
South Indian International Movie Awards	Best Supporting Actor	Kishore	Nominated	
South Indian International Movie Awards	Best Lyricist	Rakshit Shetty ("Gatiya Ilidu")	Nominated	
South Indian International Movie Awards	Best Music Director	B. Ajaneesh Loknath	Nominated	
South Indian International Movie Awards	Best Debutant Director	Rakshit Shetty	Nominated	

== Future ==
Rakshit Shetty is teaming up with Hombale Films, for Richard Anthony: Lord of the Sea, which is based on the iconic character from the film. The film is being written and directed by Rakshit Shetty, marking his comeback, as a director, after 7 years. It will serve as both a prequel and sequel to Ulidavaru Kandanthe, showcasing the events before and after it, running parallelly, and ending with a solid climax.

== See also ==
- Rashomon effect
