= Octopus (2015 film) =

- Theatrical release poster
- Directed by: Annaiah P.
- Written by: K. Lakshman (dialogues)
- Story by: Annaiah P.
- Produced by: D. C. Prasanna Kumar Doddabele
- Starring: Kishore; Yagna Shetty
- Cinematography: Manohar Joshi
- Edited by: Suresh Urs
- Music by: A. K. Rishal Sai
- Release date: 20 November 2015
- Country: India
- Language: Kannada

Octopus is a 2015 Indian Kannada-language mystery thriller film directed by Annaiah P. and starring Kishore and Yagna Shetty.

== Cast ==
- Kishore as Yashwanth
- Yagna Shetty as Danya
- Tilak
- Ashwini
- Tara
- Trishul
- Jai Jagadish as Dinakar
- Bullet Prakash
- Sampath Ram
- Master Charanth
- Master Tushar
- Sharath Lohitashwa
- Ramesh Pandit

== Production ==
The film was reported to be a bilingual also made in Tamil but that version was never released.

== Soundtrack ==
The soundtrack was composed by A. K. Rishal Sai. The audio release function was held at Chamundeshwari Studio in Bangalore.

All lyrics are written by K. Kalyan.

Track listing
No.	Title	Singer(s)	Length
1.	"Sogase Sogase"	Rajesh Krishnan, Sunitha	4:57
2.	"Neenendhu Smarttu"	Mohan	2:18
3.	"Neeyaro Ninagyaro"	Vijay Prakash	4:51
4.	"Ok Ok Ella Ok"	Sunitha	4:34
Total length:			16:40

== Reception ==
=== Critical response ===
A critic from The Times of India rated the film two out of five stars and wrote that "This could have been a nice medical thriller, but the trivial treatment makes it fall way short of the finish line". A critic from The New Indian Express wrote that "The title has no relevance too. Subjects like Octopus needs the makers to discuss and not just guess, else they just make a mess and miss the bus". A critic from Deccan Herald wrote that "Sadly, instead of a deft medical thriller, all one gets to see is a personal revenge drama with a medical discovery as pretext. Kishore does justice to his role while Tilak matches him. Yagna is just a pretty prop".
