= Moda Kavida Vaathavarana =

2026 Indian Kannada language film

- Poster
- Directed by: Simple Suni
- Starring: Sheelam M Swamy; Moksha Kushal
- Release date: 26 June 2026
- Country: India
- Language: Kannada

Moda Kavida Vaathavarana is a 2026 Kannada language film directed by Simple Suni. The film stars Sheelam M Swamy, and Moksha Kushal in the lead role.

== Cast ==
- Sheelam M Swamy
- Moksha Kushal
- Saathvika Raj

== Reception ==
Susmita Sameera of The Times of India said that "Moda Kavida Vaathavarana is an ambitious attempt to blend a complicated relationship drama with psychological mystery. While its intriguing premise, scenic visuals, and sincere performances keep it watchable, the screenplay becomes increasingly cluttered with excessive twists. The film never fully capitalizes on the potential of either genre, resulting in an experience that feels more scattered than satisfying." A Sharadhaa of The New Indian Express said that "By the end, the film is not concerned with neat conclusions. It explores drift, people slipping into patterns they do not fully recognise until they are already inside them. Like the spider web motif, the film is delicate from a distance yet quietly binding up close." Vivek M.V of The Hindu said that "The movie keeps us in a confused state as we aren't sure who to root for. Suni has tried dabbling in three genres, but a better script would have salvaged Moda Kavida Vaathavarana." Y. Maheswara Reddy of the Bangalore Mirror said that "Sree Rangaraju’s cinematography is a visual treat. The movie is worth a watch for multiplex audiences who love romantic stories."
