= Maarigallu =

- Genre: Supernatural folklore thriller
- Created by: Devraj Poojary
- Written by: Devraj Poojary
- Directed by: Devraj Poojary
- Starring: GopalKrishna Deshpande; Rangayana Raghu; Praveen Tej; Prashanth Siddi; Ninaad Hrithsa; A. S. Suraj
- Music by: L. V. Muthu; L. V. Ganesh
- Country of origin: India
- Original language: Kannada
- No. of seasons: 1
- No. of episodes: 7

Production
- Producer: Ashwini Puneeth Rajkumar
- Cinematography: S. K. Rao
- Editor: Kevin Shervin Mascarenhas
- Production company: PRK Productions

Original release
- Network: ZEE5
- Release: 31 October 2025 – present

Maarigallu is an Indian Kannada-language supernatural folklore thriller web series written and directed by Devraj Poojary and produced by Ashwini Puneeth Rajkumar under PRK Productions. The story revolves around a lost Kadamba-era treasure and a haunting sequence of events that blur the line between belief and fear. The show stars Gopal Krishna Deshpande and Rangayana Raghu, Praveen Tej, each in their web-series debuts, alongside Ninaad Hrithsa, Prashanth Siddi and A. S. Suraj. It was released for streaming on ZEE5 on 31 October 2025 as a seven-episode season.

== Premise ==
The series is set in the 1990s in and around a village near Sirsi, Karnataka, where a group of villagers uncover an ancient clue to a lost treasure believed to date back to the Kadamba dynasty, one of the earliest ruling dynasties in Karnataka. The discovery sets off a search that draws in local power brokers, opportunists and officials, and develops into a conflict driven by greed, betrayal, faith, and superstition.

== Cast and characters ==
- GopalKrishna Deshpande
- Rangayana Raghu
- Praveen Tej
- Prashanth Siddi
- Ninad Harithsa
- A S Suraj

== Episodes ==
No.	Title	Directed by	Original release date
1	"Welcome to Maarigallu"	Gopal Krishna Deshpande	31 October 2025
Varada and his Bedaravesha companions uncover a hidden treasure trail within their village. As they begin following the clues, they realize they are not alone—an unknown force is also pursuing the same treasure, turning their quest into a tense race of discovery and survival.
2	"Lakshmi Rahasya"	Gopal Krishna Deshpande	31 October 2025
Varada hides a secret known only to Mari Gowda. The two join forces to gather a team for a daring mission, but their actions soon stir something far more powerful—the wrath of the goddess Maari herself.
3	"Kadamba Nidhi"	Gopal Krishna Deshpande	31 October 2025
Mari Gowda conceals a hidden agenda behind the mission. As the crew’s determination drives them to reach their destination, an unexpected visitor’s arrival turns their journey into a startling confrontation.
4	"Bali Kuri"	Gopal Krishna Deshpande	31 October 2025
Blinded by greed, the crew is cast out from the safety of their village. Suspicion begins to grow among them, and their quest takes a dark turn when tragedy strikes—claiming one of their own.
5	"No More A Secret"	Gopal Krishna Deshpande	31 October 2025
As the treasure hunters finally reach the forest, excitement fills the air. Guided by Devi, a villager who knows the terrain, they make their way to a mysterious pit hidden deep among the trees. But as they stand on its edge, one question lingers—has their search truly come to an end?
6	"Bedara Vesha"	Gopal Krishna Deshpande	31 October 2025
Haunted by guilt, Varada struggles to deliver his Bedara Vesha performance. As his faltering act leaves the audience disheartened, an unexpected revelation emerges—the dancers stumble upon a vital clue that could change the course of their treasure hunt.
7	"The Showdown"	Gopal Krishna Deshpande	31 October 2025
The crew begins to grasp the true weight of the curse as the immense power of Goddess Maari unfolds before them. When the treasure is finally returned to its rightful place, a question remains—will this act be enough to restore peace once again?

== Production ==
=== Development ===
Maarigallu was announced as a Kannada original series for ZEE5 in collaboration with PRK Productions, the banner founded by actor Puneeth Rajkumar. The series is written and directed by Devraj (also credited as Devaraj) Poojary, known for the feature Matsyagandha. It is produced by Ashwini Puneeth Rajkumar, with cinematography by S. K. Rao and music by L. V. Muthu and L. V. Ganesh.

=== Filming ===
Principal photography was carried out largely on location in and around Sirsi, including forested and rural settings, and was completed in early October 2025 after minor rain-related delays while shooting in live outdoor locations. Actor Praveen Tej stated that the series was shot in approximately 23 days.

== Release ==
The first teaser for Maarigallu included an animated recreation of Puneeth Rajkumar portraying Mayurasharma, depicted in the teaser as the founding king of the Kadamba dynasty. The trailer was released on 23 October 2025. Maarigallu premiered on ZEE5 on 31 October 2025.
