= Yagna Shetty =

Indian actress

- Born: Yagna Shetty; Kudremukh, Karnataka, India
- Education: Manipal University
- Occupation: Actress
- Years active: 2006–present
- Spouse: Sandeep Shetty (m. 2019)

Yagna Shetty is an Indian actress known for her work in Kannada cinema. She made her debut in the 2007 film Ondu Preethiya Kathe, following which she appeared in Eddelu Manjunatha, a performance that won her a Filmfare Special Award. She got noticed for her performances in Sugreeva (2010) and Allide Nammane Illi Bande Summane (2011). Known for portraying deglamorous and serious roles, she went on to appear in other critical and commercial successes such as Love Guru (2009), Kalla Malla Sulla (2011) and Ulidavaru Kandanthe (2014). Her performance in Act 1978 (2020), won her the Filmfare Award for Best Actress – Kannada.

== Early life ==
Yagna Shetty was born to Umesh Shetty and Jayanti Shetty, into the Tuluva community in Kudremukh, Karnataka. She has three siblings – Mahalaxmi, Gayatri and Ashwini. She completed her schooling at the Kendriya School in Panambur, Bachelor of Business Management (BBM) course at the SDM College in Mangalore and later pursued Master of Business Administration (MBA) in Finance at the Manipal University.

== Career ==
=== 2007–2013 ===
Shetty auditioned for her debut role in the 2007 Kannada language film Ondu Preethiya Kathe in Hindi due to her non fluency in Kannada at the time. She was cast as the female lead opposite Shanker Aryan. The film received positive reviews from critics, with Shetty's performance receiving praise. Rediff in its review called it a "promising debut". In 2009, she starred in two films, Eddelu Manjunatha and Love Guru, and received critical acclaim for her performances in both the films. For her portrayal of Gowri in the comedy film Eddelu Manjunatha, the wife of Manjunatha (played by Jaggesh), a hard working woman struggling to make ends meet, she received the Filmfare Special Award. For her performance in the latter film, received a Filmfare Award for Best Supporting Actress nomination.

Shetty had two releases in 2010. Her first role was in Sugreeva, in which she was cast opposite Shiva Rajkumar as his wife and of a mother to a wannabe Michael Jackson. Rediff called her performance in the film "convincing". In her next release Kari Chirathe, she played the role of Bharathi, who falls in love with a mentally unstable person (played by Duniya Vijay). 2011 saw three releases of Shetty, among which was the comedy film Kalla Malla Sulla, a performance for which she received critical acclaim, playing the role of the wife of a media baron (played by Ramesh Arvind).

=== 2014–present ===
Shetty's first release of 2014 was Kwatle, a film that was received largely negative reviews from critics. The Times of India in its review called her performance "a complete failure". In her next film, she starred in a supporting role as Sharada, a fishwife and the love interest of Munna (played by Kishore) in Ulidavaru Kandanthe, a critical success but a commercial failure. In her final release of 2014, she played Yagna in Sadagara, which received mixed reviews from critics. She worked on the thriller film Octopus. As of March 2015, Shetty has the delayed project Love Junctionand H/34 Pallavi Talkies up for release. She is currently filming with Ramabai, playing the titular role, a biographical film on the life of Ramabai, the first wife of social reformer B. R. Ambedkar and Ram Gopal Varma's Killing Veerappan as Muthulakshmi, the wife of slain forest brigand, Veerappan.

In 2016, Shetty made her debut in television with the soap opera, Vaarasdaara. Dealing with the issue of female infanticide, she plays the role of a mother in the soap.

== Personal life ==
Yagna Shetty married Sandeep Shetty on 30 October 2019 in Mangalore.

== Filmography ==
=== Films ===
Key
†	Denotes films that have not yet been released

Year	Film	Role	Notes
2007	Ondu Preethiya Kathe	Sakshi	
2009	Eddelu Manjunatha	Gowri	Filmfare Special Award for Best Actress - Kanmada
2009	Love Guru		Nominated, Filmfare Award for Best Supporting Actress – Kannada
2010	Sugreeva	Pooja	
2010	Kari Chirathe	Bharathi	
2011	Panchamrutha		
2011	Allide Nammane Illi Bande Summane		
2011	Kalla Malla Sulla	Ramya	
2014	Kwatle	Nagi	
2014	Ulidavaru Kandanthe	Sharadha	
2014	Sadagara	Yagna	
2015	Octopus	Danya	
2016	Killing Veerappan	Muthulakshmi	Nominated, SIIMA Award for Best Actress in a Supporting Role – Kannada
2016	Ramabai	Ramabai	
2017	Kalathur Gramam	Selvamba	Tamil film
2018	Operation 2019	Umadevi	Telugu film
2019	Lakshmi's NTR	Lakshmi Parvathi	Telugu film
2019	Operation Nakshatra	Smitha	
2019	Katha Sangama		
2020	ACT 1978	Geetha	Filmfare Award for Best Actress - Kannada
2022	H/34 Pallavi Talkies		

=== Television ===
- Vaarasdaara (2016–2017)
