= Allide Nammane Illi Bande Summane =

- Directed by: Gopi Peenya
- Written by: Gopi Peenya (dialogue)
- Screenplay by: Saurav Babu; Gopi Peenya
- Story by: Saurav Babu
- Produced by: Roopa Saurav
- Starring: Saurav Babu; Sriraj; Yagna Shetty; Reena Mehta
- Cinematography: P. K. H. Das
- Edited by: B. S. Kemparaju
- Music by: Gurukiran
- Release date: 9 September 2011
- Country: India
- Language: Kannada

Allide Nammane Illi Bande Summane (transl. My home is there, I have come here without purpose) is a 2011 Indian Kannada-language drama film directed by Gopi Peenya and starring Saurav Babu, Sriraj, Yagna Shetty and Reena Mehta. Gopi Peenya and B. S. Kemparaju won the Karnataka State Film Award for Best Dialogue and Best Editor, respectively, for their work in this film.

== Cast ==
- Saurav Babu as Kenchappa
- Sriraj as Sudhi
- Yagna Shetty
- Reena Mehta
- Dattatreya
- Padma Kumta
- Jaggesh (special appearance in the song "Kandora Hendru Akka")
- Komal (special appearance in the song "Kandora Hendru Akka")

== Production ==
NRI Saurav Babu himself produced, acted and wrote the film's story and screenplay, which is based on his own life of growing up in Mandya and moving to America.

== Soundtrack ==
The music was composed by Gurukiran.

Track listing
No.	Title	Lyrics	Singer(s)	Length
1.	"Kandora Hendru Akka"	V. Manohar	Gurukiran, Chetan Sosca, Aditya Nadig	3:46
2.	"Thuru Thuru Thunthuru"	Kaviraj	Rajesh Krishnan, Manjari	4:17
3.	"Bella Bellane"	Kaviraj	Meghana Venkatesh	3:06
Total length:				11:09

== Reception ==
A critic from The Times of India wrote that "Gopi Peenya joins the band of young debut directors on a positive note by selecting a real-life story of an Indian who goes to the US only to be greeted by an entirely different way of life". A critic from Deccan Herald wrote that "Allide Nammane Illi Bande Summane is yet another reason to wind up the memory clock". A critic from IANS wrote that "Gopi Peenya makes a good impact through his first film. Despite new faces in the lead roles, Allide Nammane Illibande Summane is sure to make an impact with audience".
