= Vanilla (2018 film) =

- Release poster
- Directed by: Jayatheertha
- Produced by: Jairaj
- Starring: Avinash J Swathi Konde; Ravishankar Gowda
- Cinematography: Kiran Hampapur
- Music by: Bharath B. J.
- Production company: Akhila Productions
- Release date: 1 June 2018
- Country: India
- Language: Kannada

Vanilla is a 2018 Indian Kannada-language mystery film directed by Jayatheertha and starring newcomers Avinash J and Swathi Konde along with Ravishankar Gowda.

== Cast ==
- Avinash J as Avinash a.k.a. Avi
- Swathi Konde as Anagha a.k.a. Anu
- Ravishankar Gowda as Police inspector
- Paavana Gowda
- Rehman
- Girish

== Soundtrack ==
The music was composed by Bharath B. J.

Song	Lyricist	Singer(s)
"Aavarisu Baa Mellane"	Madan Bellisalu	Vijay Prakash, Inchara Nagesh
"Eduredurali"	Arjun Luis	Eesha Suchi, Ashwin Sharma
"Onde Mathalli"	Jayant Kaikini	Rajesh Krishnan
"Theme Of Vanilla"	—	Instrumental
"Eravalu Kodu"	Jayanth Kumar T V	Eesha Suchi, Ashwin Sharma

== Reception ==
A critic from Deccan Herald gave the film a rating of four out of five stars and wrote that "Vanilla has gripping sequences, fine and believable twists". A critic from The Times of India wrote that "If you are in the mood to play Sherlock, make a trip to the theatre to solve the Vanilla mystery". A critic from The Hindu wrote that "The director deserves appreciation for experimenting with a new theme with a new approach".
