= Gautham Ramachandran =

Indian film director

- Occupation: Director
- Years active: 2012–present

Gautham Ramachandran is an Indian film director, screenwriter and producer who predominantly works in Tamil Film Industry. His debut feature film was Richie, starring Nivin Pauly. He is also known for directing, writing and producing the legal drama film Gargi starring Sai Pallavi .

== Early life ==
Before becoming an independent director and film writer, Gautham worked as an assistant director for Mysskin in Mugamoodi (2012), starring Jiiva.

== Filmography ==
Year	Title	Credited as			Notes
Year	Title	Director	Producer	Writer	Notes
2017	Richie	Yes	No	Screenplay	
2022	Gargi	Yes	Yes	Yes	

== Awards and nominations ==
- SIIMA Awards 2023 - Best Debutant Producer for Gargi
- Tamil Nadu State Awards - Best Director for Gargi
