= Beautiful Manasugalu =

- Theatrical release poster
- Directed by: Jayatheertha
- Written by: Jayatheertha
- Produced by: S. Prasanna; S. Shashikala Balaji
- Starring: Sathish Ninasam; Shruthi Hariharan
- Cinematography: Kiran Hampapur
- Edited by: K. M. Prakash
- Music by: Bharath B. J.
- Production company: Skkandda Entertainment
- Distributed by: Skkandda Entertainment
- Release date: 20 January 2017
- Running time: 110 minutes
- Country: India
- Language: Kannada

Beautiful Manasugalu (transl. Beautiful Minds) is a 2017 Indian Kannada-language romantic thriller film directed by Jayatheertha and jointly produced by S. Prasanna and S. Shashikala Balaji, the film is produced under Skkandda Entertainment banner. The film features Sathish Ninasam and Shruthi Hariharan in the lead roles. The film score and soundtrack is composed by Bharath B. J.

The film was officially launched on 14 February 2015, coinciding the Valentine's Day.

Beautiful Manasugalu was released across Karnataka on 20 January 2017 and received positive reviews from critics.

== Plot ==
Prashanth is an idler with well-to-do parents who falls in love with Nandini, a responsible girl and the sole breadwinner of her family. Nandini agrees to marry him only on the condition that he gives up his carefree ways and behaves responsibly. The couple's honeyed existence is abruptly cut short when Inspector Kodanda stages a raid on the beauty parlor Nandini is working in, proclaiming that sex-trade activities were being carried out and also displays condom packets which were apparently found there as proof of the illegal activities being carried out there.

The video clips of Nandini and her friend Ratna are circulated continuously on TV, leading to Ratna attempting suicide due to the immense emotional trauma. Prashanth is shell-shocked by the news and breaks up with Nandini without giving her a chance to explain herself. It emerges later that the raid on the parlor was orchestrated by Kodanda in order to take revenge against the parlor owner who had refused to give him. When clips of Kodanda planting condom packets surface in the media, Prashanth realizes his mistake and attempts to reconcile with Nandini, who refuses to have anything more to do with him and tearfully berates him for trusting the media rather than the words of his fiancée.

In order to win back Nandini's respect, Prashanth goes on a crusade against Kodanda by kidnapping his daughter Rachana. Prashanth demands that Kodanda publicly confess to his crime of demanding bribes. Kodanda appears before the media and admits his wrongdoings, and apologizes to Nandini and Ratna for having destroyed their lives for furthering his own greedy interests. In the midst of the conference, Rachana is freed by Prashanth, and calls up her father, who rushes to the spot. Rachana is disgusted by the behaviour of her father, where she refuses to talk to him anymore and leaves. Prashanth and Nandini reconcile, and their story is featured on the TV show Beautiful Manasugalu.

== Cast ==
- Sathish Ninasam as Prashanth
- Shruthi Hariharan as Nandini
- Achyuth Kumar as Inspector Kodanda
- Tabla Nani
- Swathi Konde
- Prashanth Siddi as Prashanth's friend
- Sandeep
- Manjunath Bilikere
- Radha Jayaram
- Manjayya
- Chanchala Bhat
- Meghashri

== Production ==
The film was offered to Sathish Ninasam in 2012, before Jayatheertha completed his other film Tony. The actual filming commenced on 14 February 2015 in Vijayanagar, Bangalore.

== Soundtrack ==
Beautiful Manasugalu

Studio album by Bharath B. J.
- Genre: Feature film soundtrack
- Length: 11:36
- Labels: Maarss Movies and Music LLP

The music score of the film was composed by Bharath B. J. Initially only one song was planned, however one more additional song was added along with two instrumental tracks.

Tracklist
No.	Title	Lyrics	Singer(s)	Length
1.	"Nammooralli Chaligaladalli"	Madan Bellisaalu	Vijay Prakash	4:28
2.	"Preethi Maaruva Santheyalli"	Raghu Niduvalli	Chintan Vikas, Eesha Suchi	3:18
3.	"Tatva (theme)"		Bharath B. J.	1:29
4.	"Beautiful Manasugalu (theme)"		Bharath B. J.	2:21
Total length:				11:36

== Reception ==
The Kannada film Beautiful Manasugalu, released in 2017, got a mixed bag of reactions from critics. Deccan Chronicle called it "a breath of fresh air," saying it’s a nice try with a real-life story, even if it’s not perfect. The Hindu wasn’t so impressed, though—they felt it went back to the same old boring formula, nothing too exciting. On the other hand, Deccan Herald loved it, calling it a "soulful love" story with a sparkling message that hits you in the feels. The Times of India gave it a decent nod, saying it’s got a good heart but the usual clichés pulled it down a bit. Vijaya Karnataka also had nice things to say, praising the simple love angle and how it connects with the audience. Prajavani chipped in too, liking the emotional touch and the way it tells a relatable tale.
