= Plus (film) =

- Directed by: Gadda Viji
- Screenplay by: Gadda Viji
- Story by: Ritesh
- Produced by: Yogaraj Bhat; Rithesh
- Starring: Anant Nag; Chetan Chandra; Sudharani
- Cinematography: Guruprashanth Rai
- Edited by: Suresh Armugam
- Music by: Bharath B. J. Ravi Basrur
- Production companies: Filmy People Productions; Yogaraj Movies
- Distributed by: Yogaraj Movies
- Release date: 16 October 2015
- Running time: 151 minutes
- Country: India
- Language: Kannada

Plus (Kannada: ಪ್ಲಸ್), also known as +, is a 2015 Indian Kannada-language suspense drama science-fiction film directed by Gadda Viji and co-produced by Yogaraj Bhat. It stars Anant Nag as the lead protagonist with an image makeover.

After a lot of hype surrounding the makers' innovative marketing strategy around Ananth Nag's new look; Upon theatrical release on 16 October 2015, the film was panned by critics for being complicated and ambiguous.

== Synopsis ==
Based on the theme of 'good over evil', the plot of the film revolves around the life of a businessman trying to save himself being attacked by goons on bringing three persons all suffering from different psychological disorders together.

== Cast ==
- Anant Nag as Jaii
- Chetan Chandra as Vivek
- Shalini Vadnikatti as Nidhi
- Sudharani as Samarthana
- Aishani Shetty
- P. Ravi Shankar as Rankasura
- Achyuth Kumar
- Suchendra Prasad
- B. Suresha
- Kari Subbu
- Prashanth Siddi
- Shweta Pandit
- Gourish Akki
- Danny
- Devu
- Niranjan
- Rajesh Nataranga as Inspector Kishore
- Pawan Kumar
- Shruthi Hariharan and Ritesh in a special appearance in song "Sunday Banthu"

== Soundtrack ==
Plus

Soundtrack album by Bharath B. J.
- Released: 4 July 2015
- Recorded: 2015
- Genre: Feature film soundtrack
- Length: 33:25
- Label: Alpha Digitech

Bharath B. J. and Ravi Basrur scored the film's background music, and Bharath composed for its soundtrack. The lyrics for the soundtrack was written by Yogaraj Bhat, Goravi Aalduru and Nagesh Prasanna. The soundtrack album consists of ten tracks. It was released in Bangalore on 4 July 2015 in the form of pen-drives.

=== Track listing ===
No.	Title	Lyrics	Artist(s)	Length
1.	"Kaanada Navilidu"	Goravi Aalduru	Chetan Gandharva	3:12
2.	"Geluva Daari"	Nagesh Prasanna, Gubbi	Chetan Gandharva, Gubbi	4:05
3.	"Namdella Bari Plussu"	Yogaraj Bhat	Vijay Prakash	3:21
4.	"Plus Mashup"		Bharath B. J.	4:02
5.	"Shloka"		Anant Nag	1:05
6.	"Sari Tappu Kelada Moha"	Yogaraj Bhat	Papon, Ritisha Padmanabha	4:31
7.	"Sunday Banthu"	Yogaraj Bhat	Bharath B. J., Indu Nagaraj	4:13
8.	"Narcissistic" (theme)		Bharath B. J.	2:28
9.	"Mesophania" (theme)		Bharath B. J.	3:04
10.	"Discovery" (theme)		Bharath B. J.	3:24
Total length:				33:25

== Reception ==
The Times of India wrote that "The makers tried to call this a medical and science fiction thriller. Though, it ends up being just an experimental good-versus-evil commercial drama". The Hindu wrote that "Plus makes you wonder if storytelling is really that difficult". Deccan Chronicle wrote that "After a recent 'senseless' movie, here is a 'mindless' one, and all credit goes to the director who has positively managed to showcase his talent of making the worst movie ever".
