= Richie (film) =

2017 Indian Tamil-language neo noir action crime film by Gautham Ramachandran

- Film poster
- Directed by: Gautham Ramachandran
- Screenplay by: Gautham Ramachandran
- Based on: Ulidavaru Kandanthe (Kannada) by Rakshit Shetty
- Produced by: Anand Kumar; Vinod Shornur
- Starring: Nivin Pauly; Natty; Shraddha Srinath; Lakshmi Priyaa Chandramouli
- Cinematography: S. Pandi Kumar
- Edited by: Athul Vijay
- Music by: B. Ajaneesh Loknath
- Production companies: Yes Cinema; Cast n' Crew
- Distributed by: Trident Arts
- Release date: 8 December 2017
- Running time: 111 minutes
- Country: India
- Language: Tamil
- Box office: ~₹12.65 crore

Richie (formerly titled as Santa Maria and Avargal) is a 2017 Indian Tamil-language action crime film directed by Gautham Ramachandran (in his directorial debut) and written by Rakshit Shetty. It is a remake of the 2014 Kannada film Ulidavaru Kandanthe and stars Nivin Pauly in the title role, along with Natty, Shraddha Srinath, and Lakshmi Priyaa Chandramouli in lead roles, while Prakash Raj, Elango Kumaravel, Raj Bharath, and Aadukalam Murugadoss play supporting roles.

The film began production in June 2016. and was released in India on 8 December 2017.

== Plot ==
The film opens on Boxing Day with Megha, a news reporter from Chennai who is writing a story about the mysterious death of a young man named Richard K. Sagayam alias Richie, who was shot dead during a Santa Claus parade in the port city of Thoothukudi. Megha actually knows Richie as he grew up at the reform school her parents used to work at. Megha goes to the port city to investigate the story for her article.

By questioning many villagers, Megha learns that Richie was wrongly sent to the reform school for killing a classmate, even though his childhood best friend Raghu was the culprit. However, Raghu managed to run away from the city and escape the law. The local police then framed Richie for the murder to close the case. After witnessing his son beating up another boy at the school, Richie's father, the local priest Father A. K. Sagayam, stopped visiting him. After leaving school, Richie returned to his hometown and became a henchman of Isaac Annachi, the don of the city who controlled the local fisherman community. Anything taken from the sea is split between the fishermen and Annachi.

One evening, "Kaaka" Peter, a local fisherman, finds an ancient statue in the sea and tries to sell it by himself to a smuggler from Kolkata. However, Annachi finds out about this and has Richie abduct Peter to find out where the statue is. Peter's best friend, the motorboat mechanic Selvam alias Selvaa, who is in love with Peter's sister Philomena, tries to search for him. As it turns out, Raghu works for the smuggler. Wanting to make money for himself, Raghu steals the statue and returns to Thoothukudi for the first time in years. He secretly meets his widowed mother Radha and promises to take her with him to Dubai, where they can start a new life.

On Christmas Eve, Annachi learns that Peter sold the statue to a smuggler in Kolkata who has allegedly run away to Thoothukudi. He is then also told by Radha that her long-lost son has returned last night from Kolkata. Sensing the connection between the two cases, Annachi sends Richie to retrieve the statue from Raghu. Richie forcefully brings Raghu onto one of his boats, where he tortures Peter in front of him as punishment for going behind Annachi's back. Richie then reveals to Raghu that when he was tormented at the reform school and can never change now. However, after taking the statue, he lets Raghu go but keeps Peter captive. Raghu returns to his mother and tells her to wait for him at the train station the next day so that they can leave the city forever.

On Christmas morning, Raghu manages to track down the house of Murugesh, Richie's friend from the reform home and another member of Annachi's gang. Raghu steals the statue from the house and tries to run away but is captured by Richie and his men. Richie secretly tells Murugesh that he still cares for Raghu and that he plans to let his former friend run away with the statue and his mother. However, while driving Raghu to the train station to meet his mother, Raghu starts to get suspicious of Richie's intentions and tries to kill him but ends up getting killed by his childhood friend. Murugesh and their other friends help Richie dispose of Raghu's body in the sea. Radha is shown waiting at the train station for Raghu, who will never come.

Later in the evening, Sagayam participates in the parade and stops at Annachi's house to bless his own son for the very first time in years. Meanwhile, Selvaa finds Peter's bloodied mask in Richie's jeep, which leads him to believe that Richie killed Peter. He steals Murugesh's gun and guns Richie while he is dancing in the parade. Subsequently, Murugesh follows Selvaa and guns him down. Meanwhile, another one of Annachi's goons finds the statue and runs away with it, while the parade turns into a commotion.

Peter manages to escape his captivity, and Murugesh is arrested for killing Selvaa. Both of them, as well as Annachi, narrate their story to Megha.

== Cast ==
- Nivin Pauly as Richard K.Sagayam (Richie)
  - Master Hitesh S. Bharadwaj as Young Richie
- Natty as Selvam (Selvaa)
  - Master Dharmi S. Bharadwaj as Young Selvaa
- Shraddha Srinath as Megha
- Lakshmi Priyaa Chandramouli as Philomena
- Prakash Raj as Father A. K. Sagayam
- Elango Kumaravel as "Kaaka" Peter
- Raj Bharath as Raghu
- Aadukalam Murugadoss as Murugesh
- Tulasi as Radha
- G. K. Reddy as Isaac Annachi
- Bhargav Ramakrishnan as Das
- Winner Ramachandran as Village Chief
- Sivaraju as Sudhi
- Singam Saravanan as Elango
- Mithra as Elango's wife
- Janakiraman as Editor
- Santhakumar as Peter's friend
- Feroz Khan as Dockyard Employee

== Production ==
=== Development ===
In 2012, Gautham Ramachandran met Nivin Pauly and the pair began discussing the idea of making a bilingual film. They developed several story lines but then chose to purchase the remake rights of Rakshit Shetty's Kannada film Ulidavaru Kandanthe (2014), after being impressed with the script. Gautham began working on the script during June 2015 and revealed that nearly 40 drafts were made as he changed the screenplay of the original to fit in with the Tamil milieu. Nivin Pauly had also worked closely with Gautham on scripting the Tamil version, with the pair dropping their initial plans of making it a bilingual venture in Malayalam too. In April 2015, Gautham denied that Varalaxmi Sarathkumar had been signed on as the lead actress. The film was later dubbed in Malayalam with certain scenes being retained with the Tamil dialogue.

=== Casting ===
Natty Subramaniam joined the team to play another leading role, after the team had considered casting other actors including Sasikumar. Gautham revealed that Natty was eventually chosen because they wanted an actor who did not carry any particular image. Kannada actress Shraddha Srinath was signed on to play the leading female role opposite Nivin, while Lakshmi Priyaa Chandramouli and Elango Kumaravel were signed on to portray supporting roles as members of a fishermen community. Veteran producer G. K. Reddy, the father of actor Vishal, was signed on to play a supporting role in the film during the first schedule.

=== Filming ===
The film began the first schedule of its shoot in Tuticorin during early June 2016. Previously the movie was titled as Santa Maria and then the name was changed to Avargal. Later, it was titled as Richie.

Ashok Selvan shot for a cameo appearance in the film during September 2016, but the scenes were not featured in the final version.

== Soundtrack ==
Richie

Soundtrack album by B. Ajaneesh Loknath
- Released: 23 November 2017
- Recorded: 2017
- Genre: Feature film soundtrack
- Length: 16:38
- Label: Think Music

B. Ajaneesh Loknath chronology
Kurangu Bommai (2017)	Richie (2017)	Mojo (2017)

Music was composed by B. Ajaneesh Loknath, who composed the original Kannada film, retaining all the tunes. This is Ajaneesh's second Tamil soundtrack album after Kurangu Bommai. Audio for the movie was launched along with trailer on 23 November 2017.

No.	Title	Singers	Length
1.	"Sollathan Nenaikirane"	B. Ajaneesh Loknath	4:21
2.	"Thaayai Thedi"	Vijay Yesudas	4:43
3.	"Richie (Theme Music)"		3:27
4.	"Final Showdown"		4:09
Total length:			16:40

== Reception ==
M. Suganth of The Times of India rated the film 3/5 stars and wrote, "Where Richie scores is in the new-age-y treatment of its premise. [...] But the film doesn’t leave as much of an impact as it should. This is mainly because it doesn’t feel rooted in its milieu." Sreedhar Pillai of Firstpost wrote, "Nivin Pauly makes a decent Kollywood [Tamil cinema] debut with his swagger and screen presence, though his Tamil dialogue delivery needs to improve. [...] For audiences fed a steady diet of commercial cinema, this film — devoid of the massy entertainment elements — may come across as a dark and dreary."

Haricharan Pudipeddi of Hindustan Times gave the film 3/5 stars and wrote, "The actors get under the skin of the character and performances of Natty, Lakshmi Priya, Raj Bharat and Tulasi stand out. However, the extremely slow narrative is a letdown and makes even the two hour film feel really long." Ashameera Aiyappan of The Indian Express gave the film 2.5/5 stars and wrote, "There are several new angles added to the story in form of explanations as to why the characters do what they do. Unfortunately, they don’t sit well with the chaos the narrative style generates."

G. Ragesh of Onmanorama wrote, "Richie is undoubtedly one of the best characters that have come Nivin’s ways, and he has played the troubled youth in a matured way. However, one could still doubt if all the emotional depths of the character was translated onto the screen." Sowmya Rajendran of The News Minute wrote, "It's an interesting premise to play with within the neo noir genre, but the film leaves you wanting more." Anupama Subramanian of Deccan Chronicle wrote, "Although significantly shorter in duration than the original Ulidavaru Kandanthe, we cannot really say it is a well-crafted film and is bit too simplistic at times. The story and screenplay is a bit chaotic especially in the first half and seems to sense only post interval."
