= Suni (director) =

Indian film director, producer, screenwriter, lyricist

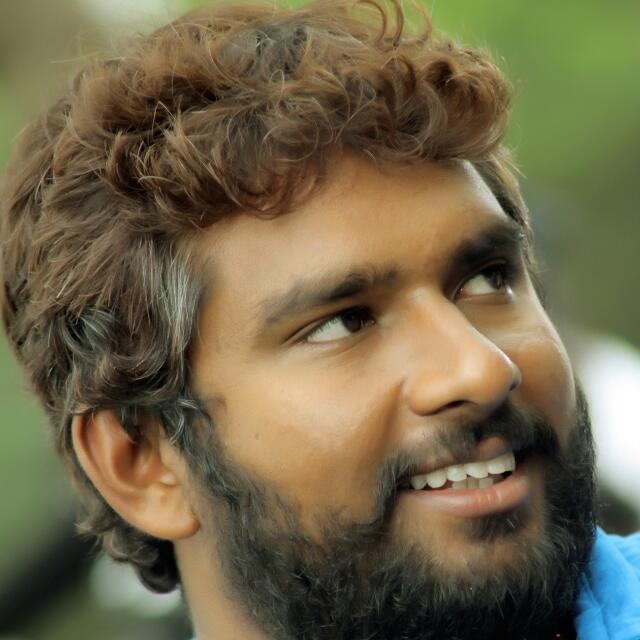
- Suni in 2014
- Other name: Simple Suni
- Occupations: Film director; producer; screenwriter; lyricist
- Years active: 2008–present
- Spouse: Soundarya Gowda (m. 2017)

Sunil Kumar known by his screen name Simple Suni, is an Indian film director, producer, screenwriter and lyricist who works in Kannada cinema. He made his debut with the critically and commercially successful 2013 film Simple Agi Ondh Love Story.

== Career ==
=== As director ===
Suni kick started his career with Janumada Gelathi, where he worked as an assistant director under Dinesh Baboo. Simultaneously working for Januma Janumadallu, under Prema, he later went on to become an associate director for Dinesh Baboo in School Master and other films. Subsequently, focus shifted to a few short films, but when he decided to go independent, what came his way was Simple Agi Ondh Love Story. When producers expected him to cut down budgets with each script, a few friends Pawan Sagar and Suni decided to go independent and invested their own money and made Simple Agi Ondh Love Story on a budget of approximately ₹30 to 40 lakhs.

He went on to produce the movie Ulidavaru Kandanthe. However, after its dismal performance at the box office, he returned to directing with Bahuparak. It was again in 2017 that he directed Operation Alamelamma starring debutant Rishi and Shraddha Srinath. His next was with Ganesh and Rashmika Mandanna titled Chamak which was an instant hit among audience for its quirky take on modern relationships.

He then introduced Dhanveer Gowda in Bazaar which was a decent hit at the box office. He once again teamed with Ganesh for Sakath which was also a decent hit at the box office.

He then collaborated with Sharan and Ashika Ranganath for Avatara Purusha to be released in two parts under Pushkar Films banner. Made under a considerably huge budget the movie opened to positive reviews but did not fetch the desired results at the box office. With a small setback on the release of the Second installment of Avatara Purusha, he announced a couple of movies over the months, starting with Robinhood starring debutant Dushyanth which was later halted and Introduced Dushyanth with Robinhood movie that was title change becomes a Gathavaibhava that was a new title in dushyant is a first movie is Robinhood to Gathavaibhava that was title changes in Robinhood is a former title to Gathavaibhava is a new title alongside Ashika Rangnath. Then he announced Ondu Sarala Prema Kathe with Vinay Rajkumar, Mallika Singh and Swathishta, with the latter two making Kannada Debut. OSPK opened to positive reviews and was a commercially successful venture. He had his next release Avatara Purusha Part 2 within 2 months of his previous release and received mixed reviews at the box office.

His next release in 2025 was the fantasy epic drama film, Gatha Vaibhava (former title : Robinhood) starring debutant Dushyanth and Ashika Ranganath. He is also yet to start The Story of Raygada which is one of his most awaited work and marks his third collaboration with Ganesh.

== Filmography ==
Key
†	Denotes films that have not yet been released

=== As a film director ===
List of Suni credits as a director
Year	Title	Notes	Ref.
2013	Simple Agi Ondh Love Story	Nominated—Filmfare Award for Best Director – Kannada	
2014	Bahuparak		
2016	Simpallag Innondh Love Story		
2017	Operation Alamelamma		
2017	Chamak	Nominated—SIIMA Award for Best Director – Kannada	
2019	Bazaar		
2021	Sakath		
2022	Avatara Purusha		
2024	Ondu Sarala Prema Kathe		
2024	Avatara Purusha 2		
2025	Gatha Vaibhava		
2026	Moda Kavida Vaathavarana		
TBA	Devaru Ruju Madidanu †	Delayed	
TBA	The Story of Raygada †	Delayed	

=== Other crew positions ===
List of Suni other credits
Year	Title	Producer	Writer	Notes
2014	Ulidavaru Kandanthe	Yes	No	Nominated, Filmfare Award for Best Film – Kannada
2017	Chowka	No	Dialogues	
2017	Happy New Year	No	Dialogues	
