= Vijay Prakash =

Indian singer and music composer

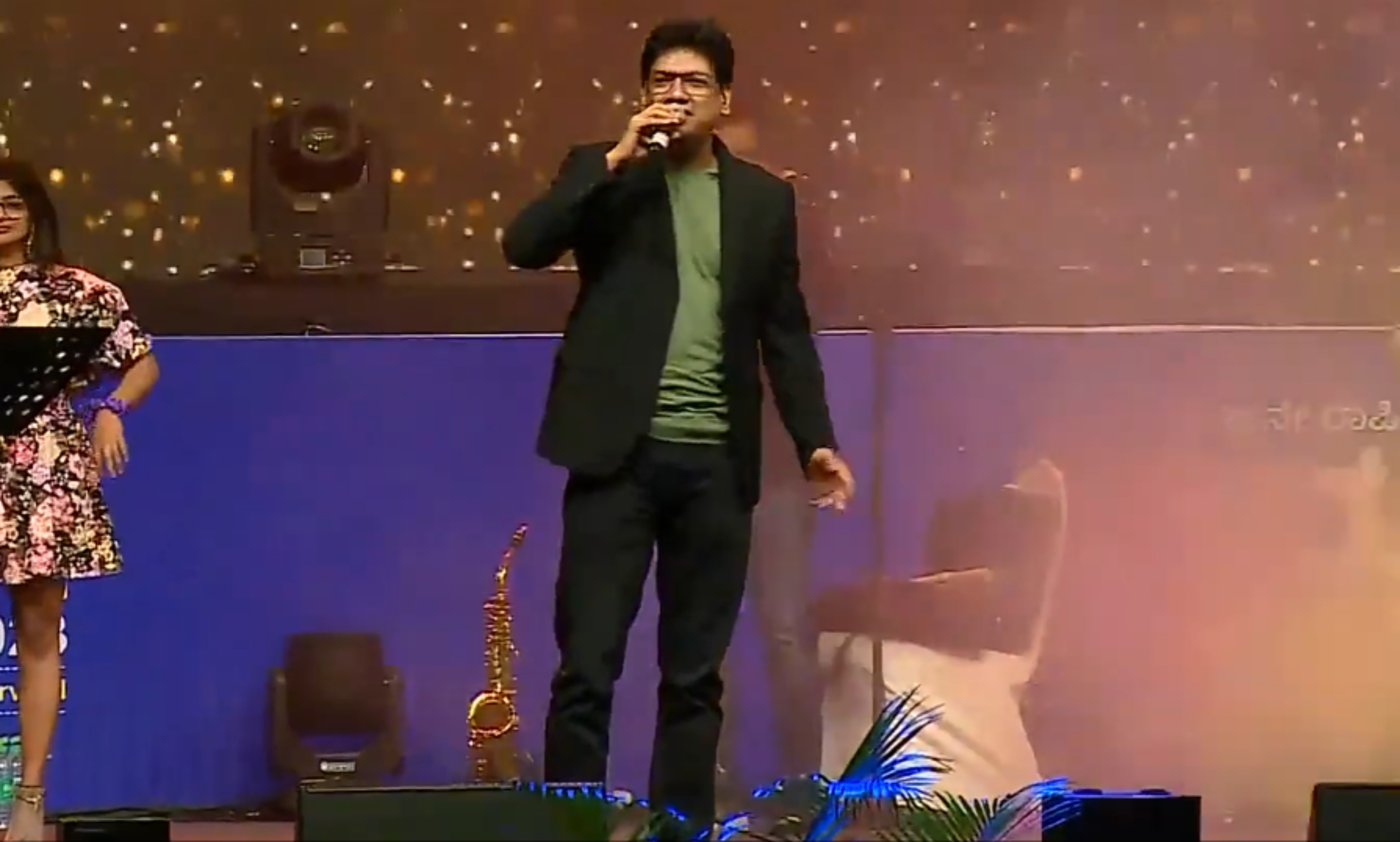
- Vijay Prakash at a stage performance
- Born: Mysuru, Karnataka, India
- Education: Sri Jayachamarajendra College of Engineering, Mysore, Karnataka, India
- Occupation: Singer
- Years active: 1997–present

Vijay Prakash is an Indian playback singer and music director from Karnataka. He has given his voice for predominantly Kannada, Tamil, and Telugu language films, in addition to Hindi, Malayalam and Marathi language films. He has also performed shows with Zakir Hussain. Prakash won the Karnataka Government's 'Best Playback Singer' award for the year 2016 for the song "Nammooralli Chaligaladalli" from the film Beautiful Manasugalu.

He is also one of four artists credited for the song "Jai Ho", which won the 2008 Academy Award for Best Original Song. Specifically, he sang the portion with the words "Jai Ho" that takes an extended high pitch at numerous junctures of the song. The song also won a Grammy Award in the category "Best Song Written For Motion Picture, Television Or Other Visual Media." He has also won the Filmfare Award for Best Male Playback Artist – Kannada twice for the songs "Gatiya Ilidu" from the Kannada film Ulidavaru Kandanthe and "Belageddu" from Kirik Party.. He is one of the judges for the Kannada and Tamil reality show Sa Re Ga Ma Pa on Zee Kannada and Zee Tamil and the famous Telugu reality show Padutha Theeyaga on ETV, which was synonymous for previously being hosted by S. P. Balasubrahmanyam before his death in 2020.

== Early life and education ==
Vijay Prakash was born in Mysore, India, to Carnatic music artists Lopamudra and L. Ramasesha, and is himself trained in Carnatic music. He was trained carnatic classic music by Bellary.M.Raghavendra

== Career ==
After moving to Mumbai in 1996, he became a student of Suresh Wadkar. Prakash was a participant in the program Sa Re Ga Ma on Zee TV, hosted by Sonu Nigam. He made it to the mega-finals in 1999. Later he compered Sa Re Ga Ma Pa on Zee Kannada. He got his first break in Hindi cinema with the film Baaz in 2002, and his first song for A. R. Rahman was in Ashutosh Gowariker's Swades, followed by the same composer's Tamil title track for the movie New. His song "Kavite" in Kannada movie Gaalipata too became famous.

He has done backing vocals for about 25 foreign films, including the film Couples Retreat, with music by A. R. Rahmaan. He has recorded for ads like "Kabhi chatpataa" for Knorr Soups and "Na sar jhuka hain kabhi" for HDFC Life Insurance. In 2008 he sang the "Condom a capella" ringtone composed by Rupert Fernandes and produced by the BBC World Service Trust for an Indian safe sex campaign. In 2009, his song, "Jai Ho"(Only chorus, original song sung by Sukhwinder Singh), won the 2008 Academy Award for Best Original Song.

He was one of the Judges in Confident Star Singer 2 (Kannada), which aired on Asianet Suvarna in 2009.

He has sung "Om Sivoham", a Sanskrit song penned by Vaali and composed by Ilaiyaraaja which was the main theme song of 2009 Tamil film Naan Kadavul.

In 2010, he became a regular artist under composer A. R. Rahman, as he performed several of his numbers such as "Hosanna" (Vinnaithaandi Varuvaaya, Ye Maaya Chesave), "Beera Beera, Veera Veera (in Tamil & Telugu Versions)" (Raavan & Raavanan), "Powerstar" (Komaram Puli) and "Kadhal Anukkal" (Enthiran).

Prakash has debuted as a music composer for the 2013 Kannada film Andar Bahar starring Shivrajkumar.

He also won the Vijay Music Awards for the Best Male Playback for the song "Hosanna" from Vinnaithaandi Varuvaayaa.

In 2013, he appeared as one of the artists in Coke Studio @ MTV.

In 2013, his song 'Khaali Quater', written by lyricist Yograj Bhat, went viral on social media. The song 'Hoge' that he has sung for the film 'Nam Life Story' in Kannada is also going viral.

In 2018, the song 'Bombe Helutaite' from the film Raajakumara inspired by the song 'Aadisi nodu bilisi nodu' from the film Kasturi Nivasa became one of the industry evergreen songs. It was written by Santhosh Ananddram . In 2021, the duo created another magical song dedicated to the student-teacher relationship named 'Paatashala' in the film Yuvarathnaa .

Prakash was also the brand ambassador of Nissan Evalia 'moves like music' campaign, which featured six young prominent artists of India.

He is one of the very few Indian musicians who have had the honour of performing at the Berklee College of Music in Boston, USA.

== Television ==
Year	Program	Channel	Language	Notes	Ref.
2012	Super Singer T20 Season 1 Finals	Star Vijay	Tamil	As judge	
2012–2021	Sa Re Ga Ma Pa Championship	Zee Kannada	Kannada	As judge	
2016	Weekend with Ramesh	Zee Kannada	Kannada	As guest	
2017–2018	Sa Re Ga Ma Pa Seniors	Zee Tamil	Tamil	Season 1, as judge	
2019	Sa Re Ga Ma Pa Seniors	Zee Tamil	Tamil	Season 2, as judge	
2022–2023	Sa Re Ga Ma Pa Seniors	Zee Tamil	Tamil	Season 3, as judge	
2021–present	Padutha Theeyaga	ETV	Telugu	As one of the current judges	
2023	Sa Re Ga Ma Pa Li'l Champs	Zee Tamil	Tamil	Season 3, as judge	
2024	Sa Re Ga Ma Pa Seniors 4	Zee Tamil	Tamil	Season 4, as judge	
2025	Sa Re Ga Ma Pa Seniors 5	Zee Tamil	Tamil	Season 5, as judge	

== Discography ==
=== As a composer ===
Year	Film title	Language	Notes
2011	Aidondla Aidu	Kannada	Guest composer
2013	Andhar Bahar	Kannada	Debut as a composer

=== Kannada ===
Year	Film	Song name	Composer	Co-singer(s)
2008	Gaalipata	"Kavithe Kavithe"	V. Harikrishna	
2009	Manasaare	"Sahanabhavatu"	Mano Murthy	
2009	Kiran Bedi	"Ballariya Gani"	Hamsalekha	
2009	Karanji	"Murida Marada"	Veer Samarth	
2009	Dhamani Dhamaniyalu Kannada (Album)	"Saayuthide Nimma Nudi"	Sagar S	
2010	Kalgejje	"Swathi Male Haage"	Gandharva	
2010	Pyaate Mandi Kaadig Bandru (TV Reality Show)	"Pyaate Mandi Kaadig Bandru"	Himself	
2010	Madesha	"Thirugo Ee Bhoomige"	Mano Murthy	
2010	Dildara	"Ee Bhoomi"	Praveen D Rao	
2010	Dildara	"Manada Ee Mugila"	Praveen D Rao	
2010	Mathe Mungaru	"Hey Janmabhoomi"	X. Paulraj	K. S. Chithra
2011	Banna Bannada Loka	"Kaledhode Ninna Nodi"	Thomas Rathnam	
2011	Kempe Gowda	"Tara Tara Hidiside"	Arjun Janya	
2011	Hudugaru	"En Chanda Ne Hudugi"	V. Harikrishna	
2011	Jogayya	"Kuri Kolina"	V. Harikrishna	
2011	Veerabahu	"Raave Raave"	V. Harikrishna	
2011	Veera Parampare	"Moodal Seeme"	S Narayan	Anuradha Bhat
2011	Dushta	"Sneha Sneha"	S Narayan	
2011	Saarathi	"Manase Manase"	V. Harikrishna	
2011	Aadu Aata Aadu	"Gul Gulabi"	V. Manohar	
2011	Shyloo	"Bandiddu Barali"	Jassie Gift	
2011	Kalla Malla Sulla	"Ee Duniyadalli"	Alex Paul	
2011	Aidondla Aidu	"Hoyuthide"	Alphonse, Balamuruli, Abhijeet	
2011	Aidondla Aidu	"Kannadi"	Alphonse, Balamuruli, Abhijeet	
2011	Tuglaq	"Nee Irbekithu"	Arjun Janya	
2011	Yogaraj But	"Sukumari"	Milind Dharmasena	
2011	Toofan	"Hoo Manave"	Elvin Joshua	
2011	Vinayaka Geleyara Balaga	"Ondinchu Kannalli"	V. Harikrishna	
2011	Kote	"Yaaradru heli"	Raghu Dixit	
2011	Nayaka	"Jeeva Nanna"	Praveen Dutt Stephen	
2011	Rasarishi Kuvempu	"Baa Chakori"	V. Manohar	
2011	Vishnuvardhana	"Nam Rootalli"	V. Harikrishna	
2011	Mandahaasa	"Manase Manase"	Veer Samarth	
2011	Parijatha	"Hogolo"	Mano Murthy	
2011	Maduve Mane	"Naxalitu Naanalla"	Manikanth Kadri	
2011	Modala Minchu	"Aa Baanali"	Ashley Mendonca and Abhilash Lakra	
2012	Munjane	"Nalle Nalle"	S. Narayan	
2012	Crazy Loka	"Ele Elege"	Manikanth Kadri	
2012	Shikari	"Indrajaala Ondu"	V. Harikrishna	
2012	Romeo	"Everybody Rock"	Arjun Janya	
2012	Godfather	"Nannede Sruthiyalli"	A. R. Rahman	
2012	Shiva	"Oosaravalli"	Gurukiran	
2012	Drama	"Thund-haikla Sahavasa"	V. Harikrishna	
2013	Simple Agi Ondh Love Story	"Nanna Preethi Kusuri"	Bharath B J	
2013	Aane Pataaki	"Ittha Ittha Baa"	Dharma Vish	
2013	Neralu	"I Love You Jaanu"	Sri Harsha	
2013	Andar Bahar	"Maleyali Minda"	Himself	
2013	Bachchan	"Hello Hello"	V. Harikrishna	
2013	Victory	"Khali Quatru"	Arjun Janya	
2013	Dyavre	"Paapa Punya"	Veer Samarth	
2014	Nam Life Story	"Hoge"	Sagar S	
2014	Ee Dil Helide Nee Bekantha	Lavvu Madi	Satish Aryan	
2014	Ninnindale	"Ninthe Ninthe"	Mani Sharma	Chinmayi, Sudhamayi
2014	Ulidavaru Kandanthe	"Male Marethu","Gaatiya Ilidu"	Ajaneesh Loknath	
2014	Jai Lalitha	"Enivaga Naanu Kannadiga"	Sridhar V. Sambhram	
2014	Adyaksha	"Open Hairsu Bitkondu "	Arjun Janya	
2014	Adyaksha	"Phonu Illa"	Arjun Janya	
2014	Ganapa	"Yaar Ivalu"	Karan B Krupa	
2014	Maanikya	"Huchcha Na" "Maamu Maamu"	Arjun Janya	
2015	Muddu Manase	"Thinthale Thinthale"	Vineeth Raj Menon	
2015	Ganapa	"Yaarivalu Yaarivalu"	Karan B.Krupa	
2015	Prema Pallakki	"Ondu Baari"	Vineeth Raj Menon	
2015	Rangitaranga	"Kele Cheluve"	Anup Bhandari	
2015	Uppi 2	"Yochane Madbeda"	Gurukiran	
2015	Vascodigama	"Sa Re Ga Mama"	Poorna Chandra Tejaswi	
2015	Plus	"Namdella Bari Plussu"	B. J. Bharath	
2015	Sapnon Ki Rani	"Kya Ji Kissa"	Dharma Vish	
2015	Kendasampige	"Ilijaaru Haadi Idu"	V. Harikrishna	
2015	Octopus	"Neeyaro Ninagyaro"	A K Rishal Sai	
2015	Sharp Shooter	"Devaranegunu"	MS Shiva Santosh	
2016	Tyson	"Kannalle Kuntebille"	R. S. Ganesh	
2016	Kotigobba 2	"Kotigobba" "Saaluthillave"	D.Imman	
2016	Kirik Party	"Belageddu"	B. Ajaneesh Loknath	
2016	Maduveya Mamatheya Kareyole	"Bangaaru"	V. Harikrishna	
2016	Shivalinga	"Yethara Yethara"	V. Harikrishna	
2016	Mast Mohabbat	"Its Time for Mohabbat"	Mano Murthy	
2016	Ricky	"Harusha Thalade"	Arjun Janya	
2016	Nan Love Track	"Friendship"	Praveen and Shyam Prasanna	
2016	Jai Maruthi 800	"Ding Dong Ding"	Arjun Janya	
2016	Lakshmana	"Kowsalya"	Arjun Janya	
2016	Kalpana 2	"Lightaagi"	Arjun Janya	
2016	Mukunda Murari	"Gopala Baa"	Arjun Janya	
2016	John Jani Janardhan	"Hudugeer" "Roomige ondu"	Arjun Janya	
2016	Happy Birthday	"Kaagegyake Kankappu"	V. Harikrishna	
2016	Dana Kayonu	"Nandu Nindu Yavaga"	V. Harikrishna	
2016	Akira	"Nam Arealondina" "Yethakondu Hogu"	B. Ajaneesh Loknath	
2016	Bhujanga	"Heartige Kanna Koredu"	Poorna Chandra Tejasvi	
2016	Sundaranga Jaana	"Nandana"	B. Ajaneesh Loknath	
2016	Badmaash	"Tadkalro"	Judah Sandhy	
2017	Chowka	"Alladsu"	V. Harikrishna	
2017	Beautiful Manasugalu	"Nammooralli Chaligaladalli"	B. J. Bharath	
2017	Hebbuli	"Sundari" "Yennenu Sodanu"	Arjun Janya	
2017	Raajakumara	"Bombe helutaite"	V. Harikrishna	
2017	Raj Vishnu	"Rajvishnu"	Arjun Janya	
2017	Dayavittu Gamanisi	"Sanchari"	Anoop Rubens	
2017	Maasthi Gudi	"Bari Nalku Dina"	Sadhu Kokila	
2017	Bangara s/o Bangarada Manushya	"Ondanondu Ooralli"	V. Harikrishna	
2017	Pataki	"Pataki" "Meese Bittivni"	Arjun Janya	
2017	Noorondu Nenapu	"Baaro Baaro Geleya"	Gagan Baderiya	
2017	Tiger	"Tinnada Unnada"	Arjun Janya	
2017	Dada is Back	"Ee Bhoomi Mele illa"	Anoop Seelin	
2017	Dhairyam	"Enappa Maadli Naanu"	Emil Mohammad	
2017	Jani	"Don't worry be happy"	Jassie Gift	
2017	Mugulu Nage	"Amara Hale Nenapu" "Hodi Ombath"	V. Harikrishna	
2017	Bharjari	"Puttagowri"	V. Harikrishna	
2017	Tarak	"Sanje Hotthu"	Arjun Janya	
2017	Satya Harishchandra	"I am your fan" "Kuladalli Keelyavudo"	Arjun Janya	
2017	Mumbai	"Lovvingu Hudugiru"		
2017	Gowdru Hotel	"Gowdru Hotel Theme"	Yuvan Shankar Raja	
2017	Raju Kannada Medium	"Kannerali"	Kiran	
2018	Brihaspathi	"Aagale Beku Naavu"	V. Harikrishna	
2018	3 Gante 30 Dina 30 Second	"Manasu Manasu" "Chitra Mathadide"	Sridhar V Sambhram	
2018	Sarkari Hi. Pra. Shaale, Kasaragodu, Koduge: Ramanna Rai	"Karavalli Song"	Vasuki Vaibhav	
2018	Samhaara	"Jeeva Hodara" "Samhaara"	Ravi Basrur	
2018	Johnny Johnny Yes Papa	"Hosa Padmavathi" "Johny Manasanna"	B. Ajaneesh Loknath	
2018	Hebbet Ramakka	"Avarbitt Ivaryaaru"	Poornachandra Tejaswi	
2018	Raambo 2	"Yavva Yavva"	Arjun Janya	
2018	Hottegagi Genu Battegagi	"Santhasada Doni Eraythu"	Ramachandra Hadpad	Vani Satish, Varsha B Suresh
2018	Puttaraju Lover of Shashikala	"Kaldhogbitte Kanla"	Sriram Gandharva	
2018	Kichchu	"Vanadevi Preethiya" "Ughey Ughey"	Arjun Janya	
2018	Kannadakkaagi Ondannu Otti	"Yella Halli Love Story" "Kannadakagi Onndannu Otti"	Arjun Janya	
2018	Dhwaja	"Hey Malli"	Santhosh Narayanan	
2018	Dhwaja	"Oora Devru"	Santhosh Narayanan	
2018	Onthara Bannagalu	"Enano Hudukutha"	Bharath BJ	
2018	Kinare	"Hello How Are You"	Surendranath	
2018	Churikatte	"Sanchondu Illi"	Vasuki Vaibhav	
2018	Devrantha Manushya	"Devrantha Manushya Ivanu"	Haricharan	
2018	Naanu L/O Jaanu	"Yaarivalo Yaarivalo"	Srinath Vijay	
2018	O Premave	"Nee Baradiru" "Booze Maad De iro"	Anand Rajavikram; Rahul Dev	
2018	Yogi Duniya	"Joru Maga Baaro Maga"	B J Bharath	
2018	Nanjndi Kalayana	"Sanna Sanna Kaaranava"	Anoop Seelin	
2018	Dalapathi	"Early Morning" "Wah Re Wah"	Charan Raj	
2018	Saaguva Daariyalli	"Bommale" "Hariyuva Nadiyali"	Charan Raj	
2018	Raja Loves Radhe	"One Day Morning"	Veer Samarth	
2018	Vanilla	"Aavarisu Baa Mellane"	Bharath B J	
2018	Kattu Kathe	"Kattu Kathe"	Vikram Subramanya	
2018	Asathoma Sadgamaya	"Scriptu Baredonu"	Wahab Saleem	
2018	Atharvaa	"Bargante"	Raghavendra.V	
2018	Prayanikara Gamanakke	"Kempe Gowdara"	Vijeth Krishna	
2018	Ayogya	"Yenammi Yenammi"	Arjun Janya	
2018	Chowkur Gate	"Ninna Nenapina"	Nitin Bakali; Akshay Rishab	
2018	Ambi Ning Vayassaytho	"Jaleela"	Arjun Janya	
2018	The Villain	"Tick Tick Tick" "Bolo Bolo Raamappa"	Arjun Janya	Kailash Kher, Prem, Siddharth Basrur; Kushala
2018	Udumba	"April Fool"	Vineeth Raj Menon	
2018	Kinaare	"Hello How Are You"	Surendra Nath B R	
2018	Kismath	"Gaali Bandanthe"	Rajesh Murugesan	
2018	K.G.F: Chapter 1	"Salaam Rocky Bhai"	Ravi Basrur	Santhosh Venky, Sachin Basrur, Puneeth Rudranag, Mohan, Shreenevas Moorthi, Vijay Urs
2019	Natasaarvabhowma	"Open The Bottle"	D. Imman	Solo
2019	Bell Bottom	"Yethake Bogase Thumba"	B. Ajaneesh Loknath	Solo
2019	Panchatantra	"Shrungarada Honge Mara""	V. Harikrishna	Solo
2019	Yajamana	"Yajamana title track"	V. Harikrishna	Solo
2019	99	"Heege Doora"	Arjun Janya	Solo
2019	Seetharama Kalyana	"Mangalyam Thanthunanena"	Anoop Seelin	Solo
2019	Sinnga	Shanne Top Agavle	Dharma Vish	
2019	Kurukshetra	"Saahore Saaho"	V. Harikrishna	Hrishikesh and Rajiv
2019	Sye Raa Narasimha Reddy	"Neram Aagatham"	Amit Trivedi	Shreya Ghoshal
2019	Aadi Lakshmi Puraana	"Manase Muttala"	Anup Bhandari	Supriya Lohith, Aishwarya Rangarajan, Anup Bhandari
2019	Face 2 Face	"Nindhe Haavali"	Ek Khwaab	Ananya Bhat
2020	Kaanadante Maayavadanu	"Kone Iradanta Preetige"	Gummineni Vijay	
2020	Gentleman	"Arere Shuruvaythu Hege"	B. Ajaneesh Loknath	
2020	Shivaji Surathkal	"Usire"	Judah Sandhy	
2020	Drona	"Sri Raamane"	Ramkrish	Swaravijayi
2020	Kushka	"Simple Saluge"	Abhilash Gupta	Abhilash Gupta, Saanvi Shetty
2021	Ramarjuna	"Oh Jeeva"	Anand Rajavikram	
2021	Roberrt	"Doshata Kano"	Arjun Janya	Hemanth
2021	Yuvarathnaa	"Paatashala"	S. Thaman	
2021	Hero	"Nenapina Hudugiye"	B. Ajaneesh Loknath	
2021	Pogaru	"Bande Bathale"	Chandan Shetty	
2021	Kotigobba 3	"Pataki Poriyo"	Arjun Janya	Anuradha Bhat
2021	Mangalavara Rajaadina	"Mangalavara Rajaadina Title Track"	Prajoth D'sa	
2021	Vijayaratha	" Amma Amma "	Premkumar. S	
2021	Love Mocktail 2	" Sanchariyagu Nee"	Nakul Abhyankar	
2021	Four Walls	" Kanmaniye "	Anand Rajavikram	
2021	Ranam	"Manasare Ninna Nodi"	Ravi Shankar	Chinmayi, Hamsika Iyer
2021	Pushpa: The Rise – Part 1 (Dubbed version)	"Jokke Jokke Meke"	Devi Sri Prasad	
2021	Pushpa: The Rise – Part 1 (Dubbed version)	"Eyy Maga Idhu Nan Jagaa"	Devi Sri Prasad	
2022	RRR (Dubbed version)	"Raamam Raaghavam"	M. M. Keeravani	Chandana Bala Kalyan, Charu Hariharan
2022	Window Seat	"Ati Chendada"	Arjun Janya	
2022	Trivikrama	"Mummy Please Mummy"	Arjun Janya	
2022	Avatara Purusha	"Hero Honda"	Arjun Janya	
2022	Kantara	"Singara Siriye"	B. Ajaneesh Loknath	Ananya Bhat
2023	Raghavendra Stores	"Single Sundara"	B. Ajaneesh Loknath	Naveen Sajju
2023	Vaamana	"Muddu Rakshasi"	B. Ajaneesh Loknath	
2024	Rangasamudra	"Untu Eno Untu"	Desi Mohan	
2024	Bachelor Party	"Warning Song"	Arjun Ramu	Abhishek M. R., Madhwesh Bhardwaj, Darshan Narayan, Narahari Achar
2024	Bachelor Party	"Paapa Santhosha"	Arjun Ramu	Abhishek M. R., Madhwesh Bhardwaj, Darshan Narayan, Narahari Achar
2024	Upadhyaksha	"Nanage Neenu"	Arjun Janya	Rakshita Suresh
2024	Karataka Damanaka	"Manuja Nindyava Ooru"	V. Harikrishna	
2024	Yuva	"Appuge"	B. Ajaneesh Loknath	
2024	Matinee	"Sanje Mele"	Poornachandra Tejaswi	
2024	Laughing Buddha	"Belagge Belagge"	Vishnu Vijay	
2024	Kaalapatthar	"Bandli Stove"	J. Anoop Seelin	
2024	Bhairathi Ranagal	"Kaavaliga"	Ravi Basrur	
2026	Chowkidar	"Appa Anthem"	Sachin Basrur	
2026	Gharga	"Bangi Sediro"	Gurukiran	Gurukiran
2026	Rakkasapuradhol	"Neena Neena"	Arjun Janya	
2026	Elra Kaleleyatthe Kala	"Bareyada Saalugala"	Praveen-Pradeep	
2026	Ayogya 2	"Hudugir"	Arjun Janya	

=== Tamil films ===
Year	Film	Song name	Composer	Co-singer(s)
2002	Ragasiyam	"En Mugam Un"	Nadeem-Shravan	Mahalakshmi Iyer
2003	Anbe Sivam	"Poo Vaasam"	Vidyasagar	Sadhana Sargam
2003	Kadhal Kisu Kisu	"Kadhal Arimugam"	Vidyasagar	Sujatha Mohan
2004	New	"New New"	A. R. Rahman	Blaaze, Karthik, Sunitha Sarathy, Tanvi Shah
2007	Urchagam	"Netru Vatcha"	Ranjit Barot	Gayatri Ganjawala
2009	Naan Kadavul	"Om Sivoham"	Ilaiyaraaja	
2010	Vinnaithaandi Varuvaayaa	"Hosanna"	A. R. Rahman	Suzanne D'Mello, Blaaze
2010	Raavanan	"Veera"	A. R. Rahman	Mustafa Kutoane
2010	Thillalangadi	"Ding Ding"	Yuvan Shankar Raja	Naveen
2010	Enthiran	"Kadhal Anukkal"	A. R. Rahman	Shreya Ghoshal
2010	Boss Engira Bhaskaran	"Iyley Iyley"	Yuvan Shankar Raja	
2010	Uthamaputhiran	"Ulagam Unakku"	Vijay Antony	
2010	Uthamaputhiran	"En Nenju"	Vijay Antony	Saindhavi
2010	Thenmerku Paruvakaatru	"Kallikaatil"	N. R. Raghunanthan	
2010	Thenmerku Paruvakaatru	"Yedi Kallachi"	N. R. Raghunanthan	Shreya Ghoshal
2011	Ko	"Aga Naga"	Harris Jayaraj	Tippu, Ranina Reddy, Priya Subramaniam, Solar Sai, Srik, Emcee Jesz
2011	Avan Ivan	"Mudhal Murai"	Yuvan Shankar Raja	
2011	Yuvan Yuvathi	"Mayakka Oosi"	Vijay Antony	Srimathumitha
2011	7aam Arivu	"Yellae Lama"	Harris Jayaraj	Karthik, Shruti Haasan, Pop Shalini
2011	Aravaan	"Nila Nila Pogudhe"	Karthik	Harini
2011	Kollaikaran	"Veliorae Kiliye"	AL Johan	Shreya Ghoshal
2011	Engeyum Eppodhum	"Govinda Govinda"	C. Sathya	Ranina Reddy, Boni
2011	Vettai	"Kattipudi"	Yuvan Shankar Raja	Shweta Pandit
2011	Nanban	"Asku Laska"	Harris Jayaraj	Chinmayi, Suvi Suresh
2011	Nanban	"Irukkaannaa"	Harris Jayaraj	Javed Ali, Sunidhi Chauhan
2011	Narthagi	"Chinnanchiru Idhayathil"	G. V. Prakash Kumar	Prashanthini
2012	Marina	"Nanban"	Girish G.	
2012	Manam Kothi Paravai	"Yenna Solla"	D. Imman	Chinmayi
2012	Naan Ee	"Konjam Konjam"	M. M. Keeravani	
2012	Krishnaveni Panjaalai	"Aalaikari"	N. R. Raghunanthan	
2012	Maattrraan	"Naani Koni"	Harris Jayaraj	Karthik, Shreya Ghoshal, Shekhinah Shawn Jazeel
2012	Thuppakki	"Antarctica"	Harris Jayaraj	Krish, Rajeev
2012	Neerparavai	"Meenukku"	N. R. Raghunanthan	Harini
2012	Ambuli	"Chandirana Sooriyana"	Sathish Kumar	
2012	Naanga	"Engay Engay"	Bala Bharathi	Mumbai Sailaja Subramaniam
2012	Mayanginen Thayanginen	"Kanavinil Neeyum"	Kannan	
2012	English Vinglish	"Ummachchi Ummachchi"	Amit Trivedi	Sneha Suresh, Chandana Bala Kalyan, Lavanya Padmanabhan
2013	Settai	"Agalaadhe Agalaadhe"	S. Thaman	Megha
2013	Kan Pesum Vaarthaigal	"Madhi Vadhani"	Shamanth	
2013	Sevarkkodi	"Puravai Vanthu Pogirai"	C. Sathya	
2013	Theeya Velai Seiyyanum Kumaru	"Kozhu Kozhu"	C. Sathya	Priya Himesh
2013	Maryan	"Innum Konjam Neram"	A. R. Rahman	Shweta Mohan
2013	Maryan	"Netru Aval Irundhaal"	A. R. Rahman	Chinmayi
2013	Thalaivaa	"Sol Sol"	G. V. Prakash Kumar	Abhay Jodhpurkar, Megha
2013	Desingu Raja	"Pom Pom Pom"	D. Imman	
2013	Irandaam Ulagam	"Vinnaithaandi Anbe"	Harris Jayaraj	
2013	Raja Rani	"Oday Oday"	G. V. Prakash Kumar	Shashaa Tirupati, Shalmali Kholgade
2013	Sillunu Oru Sandhippu	"Busse Busse"	F. S. Faizal	Rita
2013	Onbadhule Guru	"Vidhavidhamaga"	K	Chinmayi
2013	Azhagan Azhagi	"Mazhai Thuliya Nee"	Kannan	
2013	Sutta Kadhai	"Kaattukulla Kannamoochi"	Madley Blues	Harish Venkat, Harshitha
2013	Naveena Saraswathi Sabatham	"Saturday Fever"	Prem Kumar	Sayanora Philip, UV Rap
2014	Kerala Nattilam Pengaludane	""Hello Yaradhu" (Reprise)	S. S. Kumaran	
2014	Kerala Nattilam Pengaludane	"Kollai Azhage"	S. S. Kumaran	Roopkumar Rathod
2014	Thirumanam Ennum Nikkah	"Kannukkul Pothi Vaippen"	M. Ghibran	Charulatha Mani, Sadhana Sargam, Dr. R. Ganesh
2014	Naan Sigappu Manithan	"Lovely Ladies"	G. V. Prakash Kumar	Megha, Gaana Bala, Aryan Dinesh
2014	Vadacurry	"Nenjukulla Nee"	Vivek-Mervin	Ajeesh, Diwakar
2014	Aindhaam Thalaimurai Sidha Vaidhiya Sigamani	"En Anbe"	Simon	Ramya NSK
2014	Yennai Arindhaal	"Adhaaru Adhaaru"	Harris Jayaraj	Gaana Bala
2014	Netru Indru	"Pangali"	Rehaan	
2014	Nalanum Nandhiniyum	"Gummunu Varugudhu"	Ashwath	
2014	Irumbu Kuthirai	"Ange Ippo Enna Seigiraai"	G. V. Prakash Kumar	Mugdha Hasabnis, M. M. Manasi
2014	Irumbu Kuthirai	"Alay Paayum"	G. V. Prakash Kumar	Andrea Jeremiah
2014	Pattaya Kelappanum Pandiya	"Sollamale"	Aruldev	
2014	Aal	"Androru Naal"	Johan Shevanesh	
2014	Aalamaram	"Thereri Vaararu"	Ramjeevan	Anuradha Sriram, Subhitsha
2014	Azhagiya Pandipuram	"Pada Pada Pattasu"	Bharadwaj	
2015	Nannbenda	"Enai Marubadi Marubadi"	Harris Jayaraj	Megha
2015	JK Enum Nanbanin Vaazhkai	"Get Ready For My Mojo"	G. V. Prakash Kumar	Ramya NSK
2015	Sagaptham	"Oorukku Perumai"	Karthik Raja	
2015	Kangaroo	"Nenjukkuzhi"	Srinivas	Sharanya Srinivas
2015	Purampokku Engira Podhuvudamai	"Orea Oru Murai"	Varshan	Sunitha Sarathy, Ranjana
2015	Andhadhi	"Anal Meleh"	Shamanth Nag	
2016	Mudinja Ivana Pudi	"Essaalaama"	D. Imman	
2016	Kuttram 23	"Pori Vaithu"	Vishal Chandrasekhar	Shweta Mohan
2016	Maalai Nerathu Mayakkam	"Mora Saiyya (Yeno Mounam)"	Amrit	Shakthisree Gopalan
2016	Saagasam	"O Madhu (Reprise)"	S. Thaman	
2016	Thozha	"Enadhuyire"	Gopi Sundar	
2016	Zero	"Engae Ponnai"	Nivas K. Prasanna	Neeti Mohan
2016	Vaaimai	"Vaimaye Vellum"	Augath	
2016	Vaaimai	"Matta"	Augath	Blaaze
2017	Dhuruvangal Pathinaaru	"Uthira Kaayangal"	Jakes Bejoy	
2017	Bogan	"Yaaro Yaaro Avan"	D. Imman	
2017	Ennodu Vilayadu	"Vidiyaa Vidiyaa"	A. Moses	B. Mac
2017	Mupparimanam	"Uyirile Uyirile"	G. V. Prakash Kumar	
2017	7 Naatkal	"Kadhar Kadavul"	Vishal Chandrasekhar	Sindhuri Vishal
2017	Aval	"Kaarigai Kanne"	Girishh G.	Shakthisree Gopalan
2018	Nimir	"Epodhum Unmael Nyabagam"	B. Ajaneesh Loknath	
2018	Kannakkol	"Aasa Aasaiya"	Bobby	
2018	K.G.F: Chapter 1	"Salaam Rocky Bhai"	Ravi Basrur	Santhosh Venky, Sachin Basrur, Puneeth Rudranag, Mohan, Shreenevas Moorthi, Vijay Urs
2018	Kaala	"Urimayai Meetpom"	Santhosh Narayanan	Ananthu
2018	Tamizh Padam 2	"En Nadanam"	Kannan	Sharreth
2018	Seethakaathi	"Ayya"	Govind Vasantha	
2018	Seethakaathi	"The Journey of Ayya"	Govind Vasantha	
2018	Seethakaathi	"Theme of Seethakaathi"	Govind Vasantha	
2019	Sye Raa Narasimha Reddy	"Angam Unnidam"	Amit Trivedi	Shashaa Tirupati
2019	Mafia: Chapter 1	"Vedan Vandhaacho"	Jakes Bejoy	D. Sathyaprakash, Saint TFC
2019	Kee	"Kaadhoram"	Vishal Chandrasekhar	
2019	Thorati	"Saukaaram Pottu"	Ved Shankar	Kalyani Nair
2019	Thorati	"Usura Urukki"	Ved Shankar	
2019	100% Kadhal	"Nenjamellam Nindrayae"	G. V. Prakash Kumar	
2021	RRR	"Raamam Raaghavam"	M. M. Keeravani	Chandana Bala Kalyan, Charu Hariharan
2023	Raththam	"Raththam Title Track"	Kannan	
2024	Meiyazhagan	"Oor Manney"	Govind Vasantha	
2024	Chennai City Gangsters	"O Meri Jaan"	D. Imman	Chinmayi
2025	Mahavatar Narsimha	"Om Namo Bhagavate Vasudevaya"	Sam C. S.	

=== Telugu films ===
Year	Film	Song name	Composer
2006	Shiva (D)	"Ye Oohalono Telaanemo"	Ilaiyaraaja
2006	Shiva (D)	"Adaganide Cheppedi Ela"	Ilaiyaraaja
2006	Shiva (D)	"Pourusham Swasaga"	Ilaiyaraaja
2008	Chintakayala Ravi	"Bagunde Bagunde"	Vishal–Shekhar
2009	Blue (D)	"Chintela Makunedu Sardaga Chivinchemu"	A. R. Rahman
2009	Blue (D)	"Blue (Theme)"	A. R. Rahman
2010	Ye Maaya Chesave	"Ee Hrudayam"	A. R. Rahman
2010	Komaram Puli	"Power Star"	A. R. Rahman
2010	Robo (D)	"Neelo Valupu"	A. R. Rahman
2010	Orange	"Hello Rammante"	Harris Jayaraj
2011	Gaganam	"Gaganam"	Pravin Mani
2011	Rangam (D)	"Aga Naga"	Harris Jayaraj
2011	Vaadu Veedu (D)	"Brathukuna Tholisar"	Yuvan Shankar Raja
2011	Prema Kavali	"Chirunavve Visirave"	Anoop Rubens
2011	Prema Kavali	"Nuvve Nuvve"	Anoop Rubens
2011	Prema Kavali	"Chirunavve Visirave"(Remix)	Anoop Rubens
2011	Prema Kavali	"Manasantha Mukkalu Chesi"(English Version)	Anoop Rubens
2011	7th Sense (D)	"Yellae Lama"	Harris Jayaraj
2011	Oosaravelli	"Niharika Niharika"	Devi Sri Prasad
2012	Endhukante Premanta	Chill Out	G. V. Prakash Kumar
2012	Eega	Konchemu Konchemu	M. M. Keeravani
2012	Snehitudu (D)	Aska Laska	Harris Jayaraj
2012	Snehitudu (D)	Ileana Chitti Belliana	Harris Jayaraj
2012	Mr.7	Love Lo Miracle	Munna Kasi
2012	Naayak	Oka Chupulo	S. S. Thaman
2012	Brothers (D)	Rani Nanni	Harris Jayaraj
2012	Rebel	Orinayano	Raghava Lawrence
2013	Mirchi	Idhedo Bagunde	Devi Sri Prasad
2013	Priyathama Neevachata Kusalama	Preeti Preeti	Sai Karthik
2013	Attarintiki Daredi	Aaradagula Bulletu	Devi Sri Prasad
2013	Raja Rani (D)	Oday Oday	G. V. Prakash Kumar
2014	Autonagar Surya	Time Entha Raa	Anoop Rubens
2014	Loukyam	Ninnu Chudagane	Anoop Rubens
2015	S/O Satyamurthy	Come to the Party	Devi Sri Prasad
2015	Lion	Akasam	Mani Sharma
2015	Kanche	Bhaga Bhagamani	Chirantan Bhatt
2015	Kanche	Raa Mundadugeddam	Chirantan Bhatt
2015	Bengal Tiger	Chupulatho	Bheems Cecireleo
2016	Sardaar Gabbar Singh	"O Pilla Shubanalla"	Devi Sri Prasad
2016	Janatha Garage	"Jayaho Janatha"	Devi Sri Prasad
2017	Gautamiputra Satakarni	Saaho saarvabouma saaho	Chirantan Bhatt
2017	Gautamiputra Satakarni	Singhamu pai	Chirantan Bhatt
2017	Aaradugula Bullet	"Boost Pilla"	Mani Sharma
2017	Duvvada Jagannatham	Bhaje Bhaje	Devi Sri Prasad
2018	Kirrak Party	"Guruvaram"	B. Ajaneesh Loknath
2018	Idi Naa Love Story	"Aa Dhevude"	Srinath Vijay
2018	K.G.F: Chapter 1 (D)	Salaam Rocky Bhai	Ravi Basrur
2019	Maharshi	"Idhe Kadha Nee Katha"	Devi Sri Prasad
2019	Sye Raa Narasimha Reddy	"Andam Ankitam"	Amit Trivedi
2021	Naandhi	"Idhe Naandhi"	Sricharan Pakala
2021	RRR	"Raamam Raaghavam"	M. M. Keeravani
2022	Shekar	"Love Gante"	Anup Rubens
2022	Pakka Commercial	"Lehanga Lo Lady Donu"	Jakes Bejoy
2025	Kannappa	"Shiva Shiva Shankara"	Stephen Devassy
2025	Mahavatar Narsimha	"Om Namo Bhagavate Vasudevaya"	Sam C. S.

=== Other films ===
Year	Movie	Language	Song	Composer
2003	Kahan Ho Tum	Hindi	"Tum Ho Kis Haal Mein"	Rajat Dholakia
2004	Swades	Hindi	"Pal Pal Hai Bhaari"	A. R. Rahman
2004	Kyun! Ho Gaya Na...	Hindi	"Pyar Mein Sau Uljhanne Hai"	Shankar–Ehsaan–Loy
2004	Lakshya	Hindi	"Kandhon Se Milte Hain Kandhe"	Shankar–Ehsaan–Loy
2005	Kisna: The Warrior Poet	Hindi	"Mantras 1","Mantras 2"	A. R. Rahman
2005	Netaji Subhas Chandra Bose: The Forgotten Hero	Hindi	"Kadam Kadam"	A. R. Rahman
2007	Cheeni Kum	Hindi	"Sooni Sooni"	Ilaiyaraaja
2008	Yuvvraaj	Hindi	"Manamohini"	A. R. Rahman
2008	Slumdog Millionaire	Hindi	"Jai Ho (Only chorus, original song sung by Sukhwinder Singh)"	A. R. Rahman
2009	Blue	Hindi	"Fiqrana"	A. R. Rahman
2010	Raavan	Hindi	"Beera Beera"	A. R. Rahman
2012	Fatso	Hindi	"Very Sorry"	Sagar Desai
2009	Quick Gun Murugun	Hindi/English/Tamil	"Kyun Keeda Hai Aapko"	Sagar Desai
2009	Quick Gun Murugun	Hindi/English/Tamil	"Ek Tha Murugun"	Sagar Desai
2009	Quick Gun Murugun	Hindi/English/Tamil	"Chat Mangni Lover"	Sagar Desai
2009	Quick Gun Murugun	Hindi/English/Tamil	"Kuchi Kuchi Twist"	Sagar Desai
2009	Quick Gun Murugun	Hindi/English/Tamil	"Space Goddess"	Sagar Desai
2009	Quick Gun Murugun	Hindi/English/Tamil	"Aunties On The Dance Floor"	Sagar Desai
2009	Quick Gun Murugun	Hindi/English/Tamil	"Ragamuffin Mix*"	Sagar Desai
2011	Force	Hindi	"Dil Ki Hai Tamanna"	Harris Jayaraj
2018	K.G.F: Chapter 1 (Dubbed version)	Hindi	"Salaam Rocky Bhai"	Ravi Basrur
2022	RRR (Dubbed version)	Hindi	"Raamam Raaghavam"	M. M. Keeravani
2004	Aga Bai Arrecha!	Marathi	"Prabhatgeet"	Ajay–Atul
2016	Friends	Marathi	"Premika"	Pankaj Padhghan
2016	Natsamrat	Marathi	"Mituni Lochane"	Ajit Parab
2016	Guru	Marathi	"Filmy Filmy"	Pankaj Padhghan
2009	Couples Retreat	English	"Salvadore"	A. R. Rahman
2009	Neelathaamara	Malayalam	"Pakalonnu"	Vidyasagar
2013	August Club	Malayalam	"Kaattu theno"	Bennet Veetraag
2013	KQ	Malayalam	"Idhuvare njan"	Stephen Devassy
2013	Pattam Pole	Malayalam	"Kannil kannilonnu nokki"	M. Jayachandran
2015	Charlie	Malayalam	"Oru Kari Mukilinu"	Gopi Sunder
2018	K.G.F: Chapter 1 (Dubbed version)	Malayalam	"Salaam Rocky Bhai"	Ravi Basrur
2019	Sye Raa Narasimha Reddy (Dubbed version)	Malayalam	"Neram Aagatham"	Amit Trivedi
2022	RRR (Dubbed version)	Malayalam	"Raamam Raaghavam"	M. M. Keeravani
2017	Hai Bas ki Kuch Ghalib Se	Urdu	Times music	Yogesh Rairikar
2022	Drishyam 2	Hindi	"Drishyam 2 Title Track"	Devi Sri Prasad
2024	Swatantrya Veer Savarkar	Hindi	"Dharti Ka Abhimaan"	Anu Malik

== Awards and Titles ==
Year	Awards
1999	RAPA award for the Best Singer in Advertising in the year
2004	Adityakalakiranpuraskar – award by the Aditya Birla Group.
2009	Mirchi Music Award Critics Award – song of the year Tamil
2009	Airtel Super Singer Junior - Popular Male Singer Award
2010	Young Achiever award by Jaya TV in the year
2011	Edison Award - Best Playback Singer (Tamil) for "Hosanna" (Vinnaithaandi Varuvaayaa)
2011	BIG Tamil Awards Listeners Choice award – Best singer of the year
2011	5th Vijay Awards - Best Male PlayBack Singer for "Hosanna" (Vinnaithaandi Varuvaayaa)
2011	5th Suvarna Film Awards - Best Male PlayBack Singer
2012	BIG FM Award for Best Tapanguchi song (Kannada) for "Kurikolina"
2012	Crowned 'Vidyaranyashree' – Vidyaranyayuvakasangha – Bangalore Ganesh Utsav
2013	Suvarna Comedy Awards 2013 Best Singer Male for "Khaali Quarter"
2013	Suvarna Comedy Awards 2013 Best Song for "Thund Haikla Saavasa"
2013	TSR - TV9 National Film Award - Best Playback Singer (Male) for "Aaradugula Bullet" (Attarintiki Daredi)
2013	Etv Sangeet Samman 13 - Best Singer Male
2014	Big Kannada Ugadi Music Awards 92.7 - Best singer Male
2015	Zee Kannada Music Awards 2014 – Best Singer Male
2015	Filmfare Award for Best Male Playback Singer - Kannada for "Gatiya Ilidu" (Ulidavaru Kandanthe)
2015	Mirchi music awards south 2015 - Male Vocalist (Malayalam) for "Oru Karimukilu" (Charlie)
2016	Zee Kannada Dashakadha Sambhrama (10 years celebration of Zee Kannada) – Dashakadha Dhwani (Voice of Decade)
2016	Karnataka State Film Award for Best Male Playback Singer for "Nammoralli Chaligaladalli" (Beautiful Manasugalu)
2017	Filmfare Award for Best Male Playback Singer - Kannada for "Belageddu Yara Mukhava" (Kirik Party )
2017	2nd IIFA Utsavam - Best Male Playback Singer Kannada for "Belageddu Yara Mukhava" (Kirik Party )
2018	Zee Kannada Hemmeya Kannadiga 2018 - Hemmeya dhwani (Pride Voice) for the songs of 2017
2019	Zee Kannada Hemmeya Kannadiga 2019 - Hemmeya dhwani (Pride Voice) for the songs of 2018
2019	SIIMA Award - Best Male Playback Singer for "Salaam Rocky Bhai" (K.G.F: Chapter 1)
