= Simple Agi Ondh Love Story =

- Directed by: Suni
- Screenplay by: Suni
- Story by: Suni
- Produced by: S. Hemanth; Suni
- Starring: Rakshit Shetty; Shwetha Srivatsav
- Cinematography: Manohar Joshi
- Edited by: Sachin B. Ravi
- Music by: Bharath B. J.
- Production company: Suvin Cinemas
- Release date: 8 March 2013
- Running time: 130 minutes
- Country: India
- Language: Kannada

Simple Agi Ondh Love Story (or Simpalaag Ond Love Story) is a 2013 Indian Kannada-language romantic comedy film written and directed by Suni, and stars Rakshit Shetty and Shwetha Srivatsav. The film was remade in Telugu in 2018 as Idi Naa Love Story.

== Plot ==
Kushal (Rakshit Shetty) is sent by his radio jockey sister Rachana to Polibetta located in Kodagu to meet her boyfriend's sister, Dr.Ithihasini, in the hope that the two will take a liking to each other, leading to marriage, and thus paving the way for her own marriage.

Kushal meets a bubbly girl (Shwetha Srivatsav) who claims to be Ithihasini, and says the rest of the family is out of town. The two share their past romantic liaisons. Ithihasini's actions seem a little odd and her responses to Kushal's questions all avoid direct answers so it's not really a surprise when Kushal's sister calls to tell him that the girl he has been spending time with is not Ithihasini at all. When confronted the fake Ithihasini comes up with a number of different stories, but Kushal finds her even more intriguing as a result and declares his love for her despite not knowing who she actually is, although he does finally discover her real name is Khushi. Khushi is suffering from anterograde amnesia (loss of memory), the story takes a drastic leap from here. He stays in belief that khushi will remember him the next day despite getting to know from doctor that khushi will not. He day dreams instantly about khushi remembering him. After talking to his sister on the call who encourages him to take calm and think about before deciding anything. But kush has already decided either of two things will happen. If khushi remembers, he will go ahead with his marriage with her and if she does not will contemplate it as only attraction and move on. The worse happens when khushi confronts him as a stranger, having no recollection of anything happened previous night. He mourns for his heart and khushi departs as he watches. Accepting this as his fate, he starts walking away too absorbing his life twists.

== Cast ==
- Rakshit Shetty as Kushal
- Shwetha Srivatsav as Kushi
- RJ Rachana as Rachana
- Anusha Rao as Dr. Ithihasini
- Srinagar Kitty as Love Guru in a cameo appearance
- Ne La Narendra Babu in a special appearance as Kushal's lecturer
- Sandeep
- Vijeth
- Shivani
- Varsha
- RJ Pradeep

== Production ==
=== Filming ===
The film revolves only around two characters mainly the hero and the heroine and hence not much characters can be seen in the movie. The film was extensively shot in Pollibetta in Kodagu district of Karnataka and surrounding places near Madikeri and Chikmagalur during rainy season and had used a special camera to capture the nature lavishly.

== Reception ==
=== Public response ===
Simple Agi Ondh Love Story garnered a lot of initial buzz, with its trailer crossing more than 100,000 views within 3 days.

=== Critical response ===
Released with much hype and anticipation, the film received tremendous response from both the critics and audience. Shrikant Srinivasa from Rediff gave the movie a 4/5 and concluded "Simple Agi Ondh Love Story is a must-see film for all those in love, for the freshness in narration and dialogues". A critic from The Times of India scored the film at 4 out of 5 stars and says "Baanali badalaago and Smiliruvanthe Saraasari (sung by debut singer Priyanka Jois). Manohar Joshi’s camera is an added attraction to the story shot in the lush green locations of Kodagu. DI Sachin’s editing is remarkable". A critic from Bangalore Mirror scored the film at 2.5 out of 5 stars and wrote "The music is good; so is the cinematography. The film is worth a watch, perhaps for the attempt. Otherwise, watching 50 First Dates once again is not a bad idea".

== Soundtrack ==
Simple agi ond love story

Soundtrack album by Bharath B. J.
- Released: 24 January 2013
- Recorded: 2012
- Genre: Feature film soundtrack
- Length: 29:42
- Label: Jhankar Music

Bharath B. J. composed the music for the film and the soundtracks. The album has 9 soundtracks.

No.	Title	Lyrics	Singer(s)	Length
1.	"Baanali Badalago"	Siddu Kodipura	Sonu Nigam	4:48
2.	"Karagida Baanalli"	Prakash Srinivas	Sowmya Raoh	4:49
3.	"Smile Iruvanthe Sarasari"	Suni	Priyanka	2:55
4.	"Nanna Preethi Kusuri"	Suni	Vijay Prakash	2:09
5.	"Sereyadanthe Sarasari"	Suni	Bharath B. J.	2:42
6.	"Hale Gujuri Hosa Battery"	Suni	Bharath B. J.	2:27
7.	"Belligge Gymmu"	Suni	Pavan Ranadheera	2:15
8.	"Smile Iruvanthe Sarasari (Instrumental)"	Suni	Bharath B. J.	2:40
9.	"Baanali Badalago (Remixed)"	Siddu Kodipura	Sonu Nigam	4:57
Total length:				29:42

== Awards ==
61st Filmfare Awards South

Won

- Best Lyricist - Siddu Kodipura - "Baanali Badalago"
- Best Playback Singer - Female - Sowmya Raoh - "Karagida Baaninalli"

Nominated

- Best Film
- Best Director - Suni
- Best Actress - Shwetha Srivatsav
- Best Music Director - Bharath B. J.
- Best Playback Singer - Male - Sonu Nigam - "Baanali Badalago"

== Sequel ==
The film had a sequel under the same theme. Named "Simpallag Innondh Love Story", the sequel was released in March 2016 and did well at the box-office.
