= List of Kannada films of 2022 =

This is a list of Kannada films that were releases, or scheduled to be released, in 2022.

== Box office collection ==
The highest-grossing Kannada films released in 2022, by worldwide box office gross revenue, are as follows:

Highest worldwide gross of 2022
Rank	Title	Production company	Gross	Ref.
1	K.G.F: Chapter 2	Hombale Films	₹1,200 crore (equivalent to ₹13 billion or US$130 million in 2023)–₹1,250 crore (equivalent to ₹13 billion or US$140 million in 2023)	
2	Kantara	Hombale Films	₹400.93 crore (US$42 million)	(Note: India Today, The Times of India, Udayavani, Firstpost, International Business Times, The Financial Express, Times Now, ABP News, Asianet, DNA, Bollywood Hungama News 18, The Economic Times, The Indian Express, GQ India)
3	Vikrant Rona	Kichcha Creations; Shalini Arts; Invenio Origin	₹158.5 crore (US$16 million) - ₹210 crore (US$22 million)	(Note: Zee Business reported that the movie collected ₹158.50 crore But The Hindustan Times mentioned the collection as ₹159 crore. While Times Of India, India Today, DNA and ABP Marathi stated the collection to be ₹200 crore, Zee News, WION and Telegraph reported the collection to be ₹210 crore)
4	James	Kishore Productions	₹151 crore (US$16 million)	
5	777 Charlie	Paramvah Studios	₹105 crore (US$11 million)	
6	Gaalipata 2	Suraj Production	₹35 crore (US$3.6 million)	
7	Love Mocktail 2	Krishna Talkies	₹21 crore (US$2.2 million)	
8	Vedha	Zee Studio; Geeta Pictures	₹19.8 crore (US$2.1 million)	

== January – March ==
Opening		Title	Director	Cast	Studio	Ref
J A N U A R Y	14	Namma Bharatha	Kumara Swamy	Vageesh, Amala, Master Prajwal	Neela Neelakanta Films	
J A N U A R Y	28	DNA	Prakashraj Mehu	Achyuth Kumar, Yamuna, Ester Noronha, Roger Narayan	Mathrushree Enterprises	
J A N U A R Y	28	Ombattane Dikku	Dayal Padmanabhan	Yogesh, Aditi Prabhudeva	D Pictures & G Cinemas	
F E B R U A R Y	3	One Cut Two Cut	Vamshidhar Bhograj	Danish Sait, Samyukta Hornad, Prakash Belawadi, Aruna Balraj	PRK Productions; Amazon Prime release	
F E B R U A R Y	4	Halli Haikla Pyate Lifu	Manju Gangavathi	Madenuru Manu, Jaggappa, Thrivikram, Sharanya, R. K. Raghavendra	Sudeep Raj Combines	
F E B R U A R Y	4	Jadaghatta	S. Raghu	S. Raghu, Gokul, Sunil, Siddu	Shashimani Productions	
F E B R U A R Y	4	Operation 72	Gopinath Shivagiri	Gopinath Shivagiri, V Murali, Manju, Uttham, Sushanth	Maa Gopi Productions	
F E B R U A R Y	11	Oppanda	S.S.Sameer	Arjun Sarja, Radhika Kumaraswamy, J. D. Chakravarthy	FS Entertainments	
F E B R U A R Y	11	Fourwalls	SS Sajjan	Achyuth Kumar	SV Pictures	
F E B R U A R Y	11	Love Mocktail 2	Darling Krishna	Darling Krishna, Rachel David	Krishna Talkies	
F E B R U A R Y	11	Rowdy Baby	Epuru Krishna	Divya Suresh, Ravi Gowda	Warfoot Studios, Short Man Creations, Sumukha Entertainers	
F E B R U A R Y	17	Family Pack	Arjun Kumar S	Likith Shetty, Rangayana Raghu, Amrutha Iyengar	PRK Productions; Amazon Prime release	
F E B R U A R Y	17	Gilky	YK	Tarak Ponappa, Chaithra J Achar, Goutham Raj	A S Kamadhenu Films	
F E B R U A R Y	18	Bhavachithra	Girish Kumar B	Chakravarthy, Ganavi Lakshman	Wood Creepers	
F E B R U A R Y	18	By Two Love	Hari Santhosh	Dhanveerah, Sree Leela	KVN Productions	
F E B R U A R Y	18	Garudaksha	Shridhar Vaishnav	Yadu, Raksha Gowda, Vasanth Kumar	Ksheerapatha Movies	
F E B R U A R Y	18	Maha Roudram	R. M. Sunil Kumar	Krishna Mahesh, Poornima, Mysore Ramanand	Sri Nimisha Movies	
F E B R U A R Y	18	Varada	Uday Prakash	Vinod Prabhakar, Amitha Ranganath	Tiger Talkies	
F E B R U A R Y	24	Old Monk	MG Srinivas	MG Srinivas, Aditi Prabhudeva, Sudev Nair	Abhijit Enterprises	
F E B R U A R Y	24	Ek Love Ya	Prem	Raana, Rachita Ram, Reeshma Nanaiah	Rakshitha's Film Factory	
F E B R U A R Y	25	Blank	S. Jay	Krishi Thapanda, Poornachandra Mysore, Bharath	Felicity Films, Time Stream Studios	
F E B R U A R Y	25	Manasagide	Srinivas Shidlaghatta	Abhay, Athira, Meghashree	Thejas Creation	
F E B R U A R Y	25	Stabiliti	Goutham Kanade	Kashyap Bhaskar, Sandeep TC, Lakshmi Ambuga, Srinidhi Talak	WinterSun Studios	
M A R C H	2	Dear Sathya	Shiva Ganesh	Aryann Santosh, Arachana Kottige	Purple Rock Entertainers	
M A R C H	4	Aghora	N. S. Pramod Raj	Avinash, Puneeth M. N, Ashok, Rachana Dasharath	Moksha Cinemas	
M A R C H	4	Mysuru	Vasudev Reddy	Samvith, Pooja, Kuri Prathap	S R Combines	
M A R C H	4	Ragale	Ram Kumar	Ram Kumar, Shashi Dani, Amrutha, Pooja	SND Movies	
M A R C H	4	Sold	Prerana Agarwal	Kavya Shetty, Danish Sait	Horn Ok Films	
M A R C H	4	Yellow Board	Thrilok Reddy	Pradeep, Ahalya Suresh, Sneha Singh, Sadhu Kokila	Vintage Films	
M A R C H	11	Aa Thombatthu Dinagalu	Ronald Lobo, Yakub Khader Gulvady	Rathik Murdeshwar, Radha Bhagavathi, Bhavya, Kruthika Dayanand	Malvika Motion Pictures	
M A R C H	11	Hareesha Vayassu 36	Gururaj Jyeshta	Yogish Shetty, Shwetha Arehole, Prakash Thuminad, M. S. Umesh, Rakshan Madur	Shirdi Sai Balaji Films	
M A R C H	11	Koogu	R. Ranganath	K. Padmanabhan, Sangeetha, Varsha, Dattha	Bhaskara Films	
M A R C H	11	Love Murder	M. S. Ravindra	Magna Sudhakar, Jagadeesh Koppa, Bhavani Basavaraju, Kamalakannan	Online Media	
M A R C H	11	Navilugari	Anand	Anand, Ragini, N. L. Narendra Babu, Kote Prabhakar	Sri Vignesh Creations	
M A R C H	11	Paathra	Raya Shiva	Niviksha Naidu, Dhanush C, Deepu Surendranath	TRS Movie Makers	
M A R C H	17	James	Chethan Kumar	Puneeth Rajkumar, Priya Anand	Kishore Productions	

== April – June ==
Opening		Title	Director	Cast	Studio	Ref
A P R I L	1	Home Minister	Sujay K Shrihari	Upendra, Vedhika, Tanya Hope, Suman Ranganathan, Avinash	Sreeyas Chitra Poorna Naidu Production	
A P R I L	1	Taledanda	Praveen Krupakar	Sanchari Vijay, Mangala, Ramesh Pandit, Mandya Ramesh, Chaithra J Achar, Bhavani Prakash	Kripanidhi Kreations	
A P R I L	1	Instant Karma	Sandeep Mahantesh	Yash Shetty, Shreshta Kenda, Anjan Dev, Prajwal Shetty	Break Free Cinemas	
A P R I L	1	Local Train	T N Rudramani	Krishna, Meenakshi Dixit, Ester Noronha, Saurav Lokesh	Sanjana Cine Arts	
A P R I L	1	Body God	Prabhu Srinivas	Manoj Kumaraswamy, Guruprasad, Tanisha Kuppanda, Deepika Aradhya	Alpha and Omega Productions	
A P R I L	1	Stalker	Kishore Bhargav	Suman Nagarkar, Ram, Namratha Patil, Aishwarya Nambiar	SML Productions	
A P R I L	8	Trikona	Chandrakantha	Lakshmi, Suresh Heblikar, Achyuth Kumar, Sudha Rani, Mandeep Roy, Sadhu Kokila	Police Praki Production	
A P R I L	8	Varnapatala	Chethan Mundadi	Jyothi Rai, Anoop Sagar, Arjun Nagarkar, Suhasini Maniratnam	Sai Ganesh Productions	
A P R I L	14	K.G.F: Chapter 2	Prashanth Neel	Yash, Sanjay Dutt, Srinidhi Shetty, Prakash Raj, Raveena Tandon, Malavika Avinash	Hombale Films	
A P R I L	29	Shokiwala	Jocky	Ajay Rao, Sanjana Anand	Crystal Park Cinemas	
A P R I L	29	Kshamisi Nimma Khaatheyalli Hanavilla	Vinayaka Kodsara	Diganth Manchale, Ranjani Raghavan, Aindrita Ray	Uppi Entertainers, Sound Map Productions	
A P R I L	29	Melobba Mayavi	B. Naveen Krishna	Sanchari Vijay, Ananya Shetty, Chakravarthy Chandrachud, Pavithra Jayaram	Sri Kateel Cinemas	
A P R I L	29	Raaji	Preethi S Babu	Raghavendra Rajkumar, Preethi S Babu, Prathap Simha	Santhrupthi Productions	
M A Y	5	Man of the Match	D Satya Prakash	Vasuki Vaibhav, Dharmanna Kadooru, Nataraj S Bhat	PRK Productions;Amazon Prime release	
M A Y	6	Avatara Purusha	Simple Suni	Sharan, Ashika Ranganath, Sai Kumar, Sudha Rani	Pushkar Films	
M A Y	6	Dwimukha	Madhu Srikar	Praveen Atharva, Vijay Chandra, Kavitha Gowda, Rangayana Raghu, Vijay Chendoor	Pac Creations	
M A Y	6	Purushotthama	Amarnath S V	Gym Ravi, Apoorva, Kiran Jai	Ravi's Gym Productions	
M A Y	6	Takkar	Nagesh Kogilu	Manoj Kumar, Ranjani Raghavan, Saurav Lokesh	SLN Creations	
M A Y	13	Athyutthama	Shivakumar Jevaragi	Shivakumar Jevaragi, Jai Jagadish, Padma Vasanthi, Geetha Adiga	BMS Cine Creations	
M A Y	13	Critical Keerthanegalu	Kumaar	Tabla Nani, Suchendra Prasad, Aruna Balraj	Kesari Films Capture	
M A Y	13	Kasthuri Mahal	Dinesh Baboo	Shanvi Srivastava, Skanda Ashok, Rangayana Raghu, Shruthi Prakash	Sri Bhavani Arts	
M A Y	13	Selfie Mummy Googl Daddy	Madhuchandra R	Srujan Lokesh, Meghana Raj	Aakasha Butti Cinemas	
M A Y	20	Anger	Nataraj Rangayana	Manvith, Punya Gowda, Anand Babu, Psycho Shivaji	Sri Gowri Combines	
M A Y	20	Chakradhipathi	Maliyanna H	Vijay Raj, Anjali, Shivu Manjunath	Kala Bhairava Cine Productions	
M A Y	20	Cutting Shop	Pavan Bhat	K. B. Praveen, Archana Kottige, Naveen Krishna, S. K. Bhagavan	Young Thinkers films	
M A Y	20	Dari Yavudayya Vaikuntake	Siddu Poornachandra	Vardhan Thirthahalli, Bala Rajwadi, Pooja, Anusha Rodriguez	Sri Basaveshwara Creations	
M A Y	20	Garuda	Dhana Kumar. K	Srinagar Kitty, Siddharth Mahesh, Aindrita Ray, Ashika Ranganath	Orange Pixels film factory	
M A Y	20	Kandhidi Nodona	S K Nagendra Urs	Pranava Surya, S K Nagendra Urs, Vijay Chendoor, Priyanka Malali	The Manleo Creations	
M A Y	20	Prarambha	Manu Kalyadi	Manoranjan Ravichandran, Keerti Kalakeri	Jenusri Tanusha Productions	
M A Y	20	Saara Vajra	Aarna Saadya	Anu Prabhakar, Rahman Hassan, Ramesh Bhat, Sudha Belawadi	Sambrama Dream House	
M A Y	20	Sakutumba Sametha	Rahul PK	Bharath GB, Siri Ravikumar	Paramvah Studios	
M A Y	20	Twenty One Hours	Jaishankar Pandit	Dhananjay, Rahul Madhav, Durga Krishna, Sudev Nair	Aham Conceptam Pvt. Ltd, Entertainment LLP	
M A Y	27	Anjan	R. Sagar	Anjan, Josita Anola	Pradeep Sagar Movies	
M A Y	27	Dheeran	Swamy Y B N	Swamy Y B N, Laksha Shetty, Pramod Shetty, B V Bhaskar	DIOXE Entertainments	
M A Y	27	Kaaneyaadavara Bagge Prakatane	Anilkumar T. M.	P. Ravi Shankar, Rangayana Raghu, Tabla Nani, Ashika Ranganath	AJ Talkies	
M A Y	27	Kirik Shankar	R. Anantha Raju	Yogesh, Advika, Ashalatha	MNK Movies	
M A Y	27	Physics Teacher	Sumukha	Sumukha, Prerana Kambam, Rajesh Nataranga, Mandya Ramesh	Passing Shots Films	
M A Y	27	Preethsu	K Ganeshan	Subhash, Neha, Swaminatha, Manobala	Prabhakaran Movies	
M A Y	27	Koli Taal	Abhilash Shetty	Radha Ramachandra, Prabhakar Kunder, Ganesh Mogaveera	Gubbi Cinema	
M A Y	27	Wheelchair Romeo	G. Nataraj	Ram Chethan, Mayuri Kyatari, Rangayana Raghu	Agasthya Creations	
M A Y	27	Seethayana	Prabhakar Aaripaka	Akshith Shashikumar, Anahitha Bhooshan, Vikram Shankar	Color Clouds Entertainments	
J U N E	3	Gajanana And Gang	Abhishek Shetty	Shri Mahadev, Aditi Prabhudeva	Brindavan Enterprises	
J U N E	3	Manasmitha	Appanna Santhosh	Atul Kulkarni, Pallavi Purohith, Charan Gowda, Sanjana Das	Jamuna Productions	
J U N E	3	Matador	Sudarshan G Shekar	Kiran Kumar, Kavitha Gowda, Ravi Mysore, Archana Mahesh	Om Studio	
J U N E	3	Ond Ooralli Ond Love Story	M P Arun	Pruthvi, Pallavi, Hanumantha Naviralu	Sri Veerabhadreshwara Cine Combines	
J U N E	10	777 Charlie	Kiran Raj	Rakshit Shetty, Sangeetha Sringeri	Paramvah Studios	
J U N E	10	Sri Allama Prabhu	Sharan Gadval	Sachin Suverna, Sambramashree, Ninasam Ashwath, Vikram Suri, Narayan Swamy	Amara Jyothi Pictures	
J U N E	17	Khadak	T N Nagesh	Dharma Keerthiraj, Anusha Rai, Kabir Duhan Singh	Nandini Combines	
J U N E	17	Made in China	Preetham Tegginamane	Nagabhushana, Priyanka Thimmesh	NK Studios	
J U N E	23	Harikathe Alla Girikathe	Karan Ananth, Anirudh Mahesh	Rishab Shetty, Pramod Shetty, Rachana Inder	Rishab Shetty Films	
J U N E	24	Thurthu Nirgamana	Hemanth Kumar L	Sunil Raoh, Raj B Shetty, Samyuktha Hegde, Hitha Chandrashekar, Sudharani, Achyuth Kumar	Prime Focus Ltd	
J U N E	24	Trivikrama	Sahana Murthy S	Vikram Ravichandran, Akansha Sharma, Akshara Gowda	Gowri Entertainers	
J U N E	24	Buddies	Gurutej Shetty	Kiran Raj, Siri Prahlad, Arvind Bolar	Bharti Shetty Films	
J U N E	30	Dear Vikram	K. S. Nandheesh	Sathish Ninasam, Shraddha Srinath, Vasishta N. Simha, Sonu Gowda	Backgate Productions	

== July – September ==
Opening		Title	Director	Cast	Studio	Ref.
J u L Y	1	Window Seat	Sheetal Shetty	Nirup Bhandari, Sanjana Anand, Amrutha Iyengar	KSK Show Reel	
J u L Y	1	Bairagee	SD Vijay Milton	Shiva Rajkumar, Dhananjaya, Pruthvi Ambaar, Anjali	Krishna Creations	
J u L Y	8	Girki	Veeresh P M	Vilok Raj, Tharanga Vishwa, Divya Uruduga, Rashu Mahadev	Edith Film Factory; Vasuki Movie Productions	
J u L Y	8	Sugarless	K. M. Shashidhar	Pruthvi Ambaar, Priyanka Thimmesh, Dharmanna Kadur	Shashidhar Studios Productions	
J u L Y	8	Tootu Madike	Chandra Keerthi M	Pramod Shetty, Paavana Gowda, Chandra Keerthi, Girish Shivanna	Giri Basava Production; Sarvata Cine Garage; SpreadON Studio	
J u L Y	8	Hope	Amabarish.M	Shwetha Srivatsav, Sumalatha Ambareesh, Prakash Belawadi, Pramod Shetty	Goldie Productions	
J u L Y	8	Indira	Rishikesh	Anita Bhat, Shafi, Neethu Shetty, Chakravarthy Chandrachud, Rahman Hassan	Anita Bhat Creations; DOT Talkies	
J u L Y	8	Namma Hudugaru	H B Siddu	Niranjan Sudheendra, Radhya, Vasishta Simha, Alok	Golden Heart Presents	
J u L Y	15	Benki	A R Shaan	Anish Tejeshwar, Sampada Hulivana, Shruthi Patil, Achyuth Kumar	Winkwhistle Productions Pvt Ltd	
J u L Y	15	Chase	Vilok Shetty	Radhika Narayan, Avinash Diwakar, Sheetal Shetty, Arjun Yogi	Simply Fun Media Network	
J u L Y	15	Petromax	Vijay Prasad	Sathish Ninasam, Hariprriya, Karunya Ram	Satish Picture House	
J u L Y	15	Padmavathi	Mithun Chandrashekar	Vikram Arya, Sakshi Meghana, Damodar Rao, Raghava Kalal	Rao & Rao’s Cinemas	
J u L Y	15	O My Love	Mithun Chandrashekar	Akshith Shashikumar, Keerthi Kalkere, Dev Gill, S. Narayan, Sadhu Kokila	GCB Productions	
J u L Y	15	Karmanye Vadhikarasthe	Srihari Anand	Pratheek Subramani, Divya Gowda, Dolma, Ugram Manju	Avani Productions	
J u L Y	22	Nodi Swamy Ivanu Irode Heege	Islahuddin NS	Rishi, Dhanya Balakrishna, Apoorva Bharadwaj	Starfab Production	
J u L Y	22	Maraaya	Uday Prem	Kumar Dev, Shreya, Vinaya Prasad, Diwakar, Dingri Nagaraj	Sri Honnadevi Gangadhareshwara Productions	
J u L Y	22	Sri Ranga	Venkat Bharadwaj	Master Chirayu Chakravarthy, Master Pushkal Preeth G S, Master Ranjith Rithik B M, Baby Aishani N R, Gururaja Hosakote	Rathu Creations	
J u L Y	28	Vikrant Rona	Anup Bhandari	Sudeepa, Jacqueline Fernandez, Nirup Bhandari, Neetha Ashok	Kichcha Creations; Shalini Arts; Invenio Origin	
J u L Y	29	Bypass Road	S B Srinivas	Bharath Kumar, Neethu Gowda, Neha Saxena, Thilak Shekar, Chikkanna	M B Productions	
J u L Y	29	Rakkam	K. Sendhil	Ranadheer Gowda, Amrutha Nair, Nanjappa Benaka, Ramamurthy	Namma Haiklu Chithra	
A U G U S T	12	Ravi Bopanna	V. Ravichandran	V. Ravichandran, Radhika Kumaraswamy, Kavya Shetty	Eshwari Productions	
A U G U S T	12	Gaalipata 2	Yogaraj Bhat	Ganesh, Diganth, Pawan Kumar, Anant Nag	Suraj Productions	
A U G U S T	12	Rebel Hudugaru	Dhanush Gowda	Venu Gowda, Siddu M, Vinod Anand, Shruthi Gowda	R J Cine Creations	OTT release
A U G U S T	19	Aadhav	Adarsh Hegde	Manjunath Hegde, Aruna Balraj, Sundar Veena, Kavil, Nishitha Gowda	KNK Studios, Bread and Jaam Studios	OTT release
A U G U S T	19	Love 360	Shashank	Praveen, Rachana Inder	Shashank Cinemass	
A U G U S T	26	Dollu	Sagar Puranik	Karthik Mahesh, Nidhi Hegde, Chandra Mayur	Wadeeyar Movies	
A U G U S T	26	Koutilya	Prabhakara Sherkhane	Arjun Ramesh, Priyanka Chincholi, Lakshmish Bhat, Ninasam Ashwath	Sri Kalluru Anjaneya Movies	
A U G U S T	26	Shiva 143	Anil Kumar	Dheeren Ramkumar, Manvitha Kamath, Charan Raj	Jayanna Films	
A U G U S T	26	Wikipedia	Somu Hoysala	Yashwanth, Ashika Somashekar, Manjunath Hegde	Rough Cut Production	
S E P T E M B E R	2	Fantasy	Pavan Kumar R	Priyanka Shivvanna, Bala Rajwadi, Harini Srikanth, Hemanth Srinivas	Pavan Dream Films	
S E P T E M B E R	2	Dhamaka	Lakshmi Ramesh	Shivaraj K R Pete, Nayana Sharath, Siddu Moolimani, Kote Prabhakar, Priya J Achar	S R Media Productions	
S E P T E M B E R	2	Kshipra	Sathish Krishna	Daksh, Priya Darshini, Preethi Meerajkar, Karthik Vaibhav	Pure Vision Entertainments	
S E P T E M B E R	2	Markata	Vijay Raj	Vijay Raj, Ganesh, Pooja, Badri, Charan, Ruchitha	Visual Creations	
S E P T E M B E R	2	Tajmahal - 2	Devaraj Kumar	Devaraj Kumar, Samruddhi Shukla, Shobhraj, Tabla Nani	Sri Gangambike Enterprises	
S E P T E M B E R	9	9 Sullu Kathegalu	Manjunath Muniyappa	Pramod Shetty, Vinayak Joshi, Sukrutha Wagle, Krishna Hebbale, Kari Subbu	5M Moments Works Pvt Ltd	
S E P T E M B E R	9	Lucky Man	S. Nagendra Prasad	Darling Krishna, Sangeetha Sringeri, Roshni Prakash, Puneeth Rajkumar	Parsa Pictures	
S E P T E M B E R	16	Kapala	Vinay Yadunandan	Abhimanyu prajwal, Prateeksha gowda, Giriraj BM, Yamuna Srinidhi	SKAR Productions. Soumya K Shetty	
S E P T E M B E R	16	Monsoon Raaga	S. Ravindranath	Dhananjaya, Rachita Ram	Vikhyath Chitra Productions	
S E P T E M B E R	16	Pampa Panchalli Parashivamurthy	S. Mahendar	Keerthi Banu, Sangeetha Sringeri	KEE Creations	
S E P T E M B E R	23	Guru Shishyaru	Jadeshaa K Hampi	Sharan, Nishvika Naidu	Laddu Cinema House	
S E P T E M B E R	30	Kantara	Rishab Shetty	Rishab Shetty, Sapthami Gowda, Kishore, Achyuth Kumar, Pramod Shetty	Hombale Films	
S E P T E M B E R	30	Totapuri	Vijayaprasad	Dhananjaya, Jaggesh, Aditi Prabhudeva, Suman Ranganath	Moniflix Studios	

== October – December ==
Opening		Title	Director	Cast	Studio	Ref.
O C T O B E R	14	Champion	Shahuraja Sindhe	Sachin Dhanpal, Aditi Prabhudeva, Pradeep Rawat	Shivanand S Neelannavar	
O C T O B E R	21	Head Bush	Shoonya	Dhananjaya, Payal Rajput, Shruthi Hariharan, Devaraj, Yogesh, Vasishta N. Simha, Raghu Mukherjee	Daali Pictures, Somanna Talkies	
O C T O B E R	28	Gandhada Gudi	Amoghavarsha JS	Puneeth Rajkumar, Amoghavarsha JS, Ashwini Puneeth Rajkumar	PRK Productions	
N O V E M B E R	4	Banaras	Jayathirtha	Zaid Khan, Sonal Monteiro	Tilakraj Ballal	
N O V E M B E R	11	O	Mahesha C. Ammalidoddy	Milana Nagaraj, Amrutha Iyengar, Siddu Moolimani, Suchendra Prasad	Ekaakshara Films	
N O V E M B E R	11	Raana	Nanda Kishore	Shreyas Manju, Reeshma Nanaiah	Gujjal Talkies	
N O V E M B E R	11	Dilpasand	Shiva Tejass	Darling Krishna, Nishvika Naidu, Megha Shetty	Rashmi Films	
N O V E M B E R	18	Abbara	K Ramnarayan	Prajwal Devaraj, Rajshri Ponnappa, Lekha Chandra, Nimika Ratnakar	C and M Movies	
N O V E M B E R	18	Mata	Ravindra Venshi	Santhosh Davanagere, Guruprasad, Sadhu Kokila, Mandya Ramesh	VR Combines	
N O V E M B E R	25	Raymo	Pavan Wadeyar	Ishan, Ashika Ranganath	Jayaditya Films	
N O V E M B E R	25	Triple Riding	Mahesh Gowda	Ganesh, Aditi Prabhudeva, Megha Shetty, Rachana Inder	Krupalu Entertainments	
D E C E M B E R	2	2nd Life	Raju Devasandra	Adarsh Gunduraj, Sindhu Rao, Naveen Shakti, Shiv Pradeep	Jayanna Films	
D E C E M B E R	2	Dharani Mandala Madhyadolage	Sridhar Shanmukha	Naveen Shankar, Aishani Shetty, Yash Shetty, Bala Rajwadi, Omkar Aryaa	Hyperlink Cinemas	
D E C E M B E R	2	Dushtakoota	Shadakshari Neelakantaiah	Shadakshari Neelakantaiah, J. Suraj, Akash Akki	Yes 26 Studios	
D E C E M B E R	2	Flat #9	Kishor M C	Skanda Ashok, Chandu Gowda, Thejaswini Sharma	Kishore Creations	
D E C E M B E R	2	Thimayya & Thimayya	Sanjay Sharma	Ananth Nag, Diganth, Shubra Aiyappa, Aindrita Ray, Vineet Beep Kumar	Garuda Motion Pictures	
D E C E M B E R	2	Vasanthi Nalidaga	Venshi Ravindra	Rohit Sridhar, Jeevitha Vasishta, Bhavana Srinivas, Sudharani, Saikumar, Sadhu Kokila	Jenugudu Films	
D E C E M B E R	9	Dr.56	Rajesh Anandaleela	Priyamani, Praveen Reddy, Raj Deepak Shetty, Ramesh Bhat	Hari Hara Pictures	
D E C E M B E R	9	Pankhuri	Dosti V. Anand	P. Shivakumar, Kundhana Reddy, Sasi Sekhar, Pavan Putra	Prakruthi Pictures	
D E C E M B E R	9	Prayashaha	Ranjith Rao	Rahul Amin, Krishnaa Bhat, Vineeth Kumar, Shine Shetty, Shanil Guru	Prakruthi Pictures	
D E C E M B E R	9	Vijayanand	Rishika Sharma	Nihal Rajput, Bharat Bopanna, Siri Prahlad, Anant Nag, Ravichandran, Vinaya Prasad, Shine Shetty	VRL Film Productions	
D E C E M B E R	16	10	Karm Chawla	Vinay Rajkumar, Anusha Ranganath, Gopalkrishna Deshpande, Suvin Hegde	Pushkar Films	
D E C E M B E R	16	Ninga	Bhairava. S	Arjeeth, Supritha, Kavya, Ramesh Bhat, Sudha Belawadi	Arjeeth Productions	
D E C E M B E R	16	Temper	Manju Kavi	Aryan Surya, Kaashima Rafi, Tabla Nani, Tennis Krishna, Mithra	Shree Balaji Enterprises	
D E C E M B E R	16	U Turn 2	Chandru Obaiah	Chandru Obaiah, Anand Sampangi, Pooja S M, V. Nagendra Prasad, Manju Pavagada	S M Productions, Movies Fort Films, Ashrith Cinemas	
D E C E M B E R	23	Aihole	Ravindranath Sirivara	Revanth Malige, Pragathi Soorve	Sirivara Creations	
D E C E M B E R	23	Hosa Dinachari	Keerthi Shekhar	Deepak Subramanya, Sripriya, Chethan Vicky, Babu Hirannaiah, Aruna Balraj	Dees Films	
D E C E M B E R	23	Vedha	Harsha	Shiva Rajkumar, Shwetha Chengappa, Aditi Sagar, Ganavi Laxman, Veena Ponnappa, Umashri	Geetha Pictures & Zee Studios	
D E C E M B E R	30	Alpha	Chirantha Kumar	Chirantha Kumar, Jagadeesh. D, Shama Taj	Shree Dharmashastha Movies	
D E C E M B E R	30	Jordan	Vinod Dayalan	Mahendra Prasad, Sampath Kumar, Gauri Lankesh, Manju Pavagada	No Nonsense Creations	
D E C E M B E R	30	Once Upon a Time in Jamaligudda	Kushal Gowda	Dhananjay, Aditi Prabhudeva, Bhavana, Prakash Belawadi, Triveni Rao	Niharika Movies	
D E C E M B E R	30	Made in Bengaluru	Pradeep K. Shastry	Madhusudhan Govind, Ananth Nag, Saikumar, Puneeth Manjunath, Prakash Belawadi, Sudha Belawadi	Rajani Thursday Stories	
D E C E M B E R	30	Naanu Adu Mattu Saroja	Vinay Pritham	Yogesh, Apoorva Bharadwaj, H. G. Dattatreya, Prerana Kambam, Prasanna Shetty	UK Productions	
D E C E M B E R	30	Padavipoorva	Hariprasad Jayanna	Pruthvi Shamanur, Anjali Anish, Yasha Shivakumar, Shri Mahadev, Aditi Prabhudeva, Divya Uruduga	Ravi Shamanur Films; Yograj Cinemas	
