= SIIMA Award for Best Female Debut – Kannada =

Kannada film female debut award

- Awarded for: Best Debut Performance by an Actress in a Leading Role in Kannada cinema
- Country: India
- Presented by: Vibri Media Group
- First award: 21 June 2012 (for films released in 2011)
- Most recent winner: Priyanka Achar, Elumale (2025)

SIIMA Award for Best Female Debut – Kannada is presented by Vibri media group as part of its annual South Indian International Movie Awards, for the best acting done by a female actor in a leading role in her debut Kannada film. The award was first given in 2012 for films released in 2011.

== Superlatives ==
Categories	Recipient	Notes
Oldest winner	Anupama Gowda	Age 27
Youngest winner	Sreeleela	Age 18

== Winners and nominees ==
Year	Actress	Film	Ref.
2011 (1st)	Akanksha Mansurkar	Olave Mandara	
2012 (2nd)
2012 (2nd)	Parul Yadav	Govindaya Namaha	
2012 (2nd)	Manjari Phadnis	Munjane	
2012 (2nd)	Rashmi Gautam	Guru	
2012 (2nd)	Deepika Kamaiah	Chingari	
2012 (2nd)	Nikesha Patel	Narasimha	
2013 (3rd)
2013 (3rd)	Parvathy Nair	Story Kathe	
2013 (3rd)	Akhila Kishore	Padhe Padhe	
2013 (3rd)	Sruthi Hariharan	Lucia	
2013 (3rd)	Rachita Ram	Bulbul	
2013 (3rd)	Paavana Gowda	Gombegala Love	
2014 (4th)
2014 (4th)	Shilpi Sharma	Aakramana	
2014 (4th)	Erica Fernandes	Ninnindale	
2014 (4th)	Gayathiri Iyer	Namo Bhootatma	
2014 (4th)	Aishani Shetty	Jothi Alias Kothiraj	
2014 (4th)	Shona Chhabra	Savaal	
2015 (5th)
2015 (5th)	Manvita Kamath	Kendasampige	
2015 (5th)	Apoorva Gowda	1st Rank Raju	
2015 (5th)	Nabha Natesh	Vajrakaya	
2015 (5th)	Urvashi Rautela	Mr. Airavata	
2015 (5th)	Radhika Chetan	Rangi Taranga	
2016 (6th)
2016 (6th)	Rashmika Mandanna	Kirik Party	
2016 (6th)	Ashika Rangnath	Crazy Boy	
2016 (6th)	Krishi Thapanda	Akira	
2016 (6th)	Samyuktha Hegde	Kirik Party	
2016 (6th)	Pooja S M	Thithi	
2017 (7th)
2017 (7th)	Ekta Rathod	Siliconn City	
2017 (7th)	Aditi Prabhudeva	Dhairyam	
2017 (7th)	Divya Uruduga	Huliraaya	
2017 (7th)	Kavitha Gowda	Srinivasa Kalyana	
2017 (7th)	Vaibhavi Shandilya	Raj Vishnu	
2018 (8th)
2018 (8th)	Anupama Gowda	Aa Karaala Ratri	
2018 (8th)	Aishwarya Arjun	Prema Baraha	
2018 (8th)	Nishvika Naidu	Amma I Love You	
2018 (8th)	Srinidhi Shetty	KGF: Chapter 1	
2018 (8th)	Sonal Monteiro	Abhisaarike	
2018 (8th)	Sonika Gowda	Shathaya Gathaya	
2019 (9th)
2019 (9th)	Sreeleela	Kiss	
2019 (9th)	Vaibhavi/ Vainidhi/ Vaisiri	Yaana	
2019 (9th)	Sanjana Anand	Chemistry of Kariyappa	
2019 (9th)	Sanah Thimmayyah	Odeya	
2019 (9th)	A Kashyap	Kiss	
2020 (9th)
2020 (9th)	Sapthami Gowda	Popcorn Monkey Tiger	
2020 (9th)	Ragini Prajwal	Law	
2020 (9th)	Chaithra Rao	Mayabazar 2016	
2020 (9th)	Sarah Harish	Sri Bharatha Baahubali	
2020 (9th)	Siri Prahlad	Ondu Shikariya Kathe	
2021 (10th)
2021 (10th)	Sharanya Shetty	1980	
2021 (10th)	Dhanya Ramkuma	Ninna Sanihake	
2021 (10th)	Asha Bhat	Roberrt	
2021 (10th)	Bhoomi Shetty	Ikkat	
2021 (10th)	Ganavi Laxman	Hero	
2022 (11th)
2022 (11th)	Neetha Ashok	Vikrant Rona	
2022 (11th)	Anjali Anish	Padavi Poorva	
2022 (11th)	Rachana Inder	Love 360	
2022 (11th)	Nidhi Hegde	Dollu	
2022 (11th)	Reeshma Nanaiah	Ek Love Ya	
2022 (11th)	Megha Shetty	Triple Riding	
2023 (12th)
2023 (12th)	Aradhana Ram	Kaatera	
2023 (12th)	Amrutha Prem	Tagaru Palya	
2023 (12th)	Hrithika Srinivas	Aparoopa	
2023 (12th)	Risha Gowda	Crazy Keerthy	
2023 (12th)	Vrusha Patil	Love	
2024 (13th)	Ankita Amar	Ibbani Tabbida Ileyali	
2024 (13th)	Malaika Vasupal	Upadhyaksha	
2024 (13th)	Mallika Singh	Ondu Sarala Prema Kathe	
2024 (13th)	Saanya Iyer	Gowri	
2024 (13th)	Sherlyn Bhosale	Hadinelentu	
2024 (13th)	Spandana Somanna	Dil Kush	
2024 (13th)	Swathishta Krishnan	Ondu Sarala Prema Kathe	
2025 (14th)	Priyanka Achar	Elumale	
2025 (14th)	Kavya Shaiva	Kothalavadi	
2025 (14th)	Manisha Kandkur	Brat	
2025 (14th)	Mouna Guddemane	Kuladalli Keelyavudo	
2025 (14th)	Rashika Shetty	Manada Kadalu	
2025 (14th)	Viranika Shetty	Dharmam	

== See also ==
- SIIMA Award for Best Actress – Kannada
