= Filmfare Award for Best Supporting Actor – Kannada =

Indian annual film award

- Awarded for: Best Performance by an Actor in a Supporting Role
- Country: India
- Presented by: Filmfare
- First award: Rangayana Raghu for Cyanide (2006)
- Currently held by: Gopalkrishna Deshpande for Blink (2024)
- Website: http://filmfareawards.indiatimes.com/

The Filmfare Award for Best Supporting Actor – Kannada is and award presented annually by the Filmfare magazine as part of its annual Filmfare Awards South for Kannada films. It is given in honor of an actor who has delivered an outstanding performance in a supporting role in a Kannada film. Although the awards for Kannada films started in 1970, awards for the best supporting actor category started only in 2007. At the 54th Filmfare Awards South ceremony held in 2007, Rangayana Raghu was the first winner of this award for his role in Cyanide. Since its inception, the award has been given to eight actors. Achyuth Kumar has won the awards a record four times.

== Superlatives ==
Superlative	Actor	Record
Actor with most awards	Achyuth Kumar	4 wins
Actor with most nominations	Achyuth Kumar	7 nominations
Actor with most nominations without ever winning	Anant Nag	4 nominations
Actor with most nominations in a single year	Anant Nag (2008)	2 nominations
Oldest winner	B. Suresha	60 years
Oldest nominee	H. G. Dattatreya	75 years
Youngest winner	Yash	22 years
Youngest nominee	Yash	22 years

== Winners and nominees ==
Table key
‡	Indicates the winner

Year	Actor	Film	Role(s)	Ref.
2006 (54th)	Rangayana Raghu ‡	Cyanide	Ranganath	
2007 (55th)	Sharath Lohitashwa ‡	Aa Dinagalu	Kotwal Ramachandra	
2008 (56th)	Yash ‡	Moggina Manasu	Rahul	
2008 (56th)	Anant Nag	Aramane	Rajashekhara Aras	
2008 (56th)	Anant Nag	Taj Mahal	Narayana Murthy	
2008 (56th)	Diganth	Gaalipata	Diganth	
2008 (56th)	Rajesh Krishnan	Gaalipata	Kitty	
2009 (57th)	Achyuth Kumar ‡	Jhossh	Rakesh's Father	
2009 (57th)	Dilip Raj	Love Guru	Abhi	
2009 (57th)	Rangayana Raghu	Raam	M. C. Krishna Murthy	
2009 (57th)	Sharan	Jhossh	Physical Education Teacher	
2009 (57th)	Tabla Nani	Eddelu Manjunatha	Nani	
2010 (58th)	Avinash ‡	Aptharakshaka	Ramachandra Acharya	
2010 (58th)	Achyuth Kumar	Naanu Nanna Kanasu	Brijesh Patel	
2010 (58th)	Ambareesh	Veera Parampare	Varadegowda	
2010 (58th)	Rangayana Raghu	Modalasala	Deepu's Father	
2010 (58th)	Vaijanath Biradar	Kanasemba Kudureyaneri	Irya	
2011 (59th)	P. Ravi Shankar ‡	Kempegowda	Armugam	
2011 (59th)	H. G. Dattatreya	Bettada Jeeva	Gopalaiah	
2011 (59th)	Rangayana Raghu	Olave Mandara	Ratna	
2011 (59th)	Sharath Lohitashwa	Saarathi	Nagappa	
2011 (59th)	Yogesh	Hudugaru	Siddesh	
2012 (60th)	Atul Kulkarni ‡	Edegarike	Sridhar Murthy	
2012 (60th)	Ravi Kale	Dandupalya	Hanuma	
2012 (60th)	Sai Kumar	Kalpana	Kalpana	
2012 (60th)	Sharan	Parijatha	Sundar	
2012 (60th)	Shashi Kumar	Sangolli Rayanna	Channabasava	
2013 (61st)	Achyuth Kumar ‡	Lucia	Shankaranna	
2013 (61st)	Ambareesh	Bulbul	Amarnath	
2013 (61st)	Rangayana Raghu	Jayammana Maga	Bhagavantha	
2013 (61st)	Sai Kumar	Brindavana	Madhu's Father	
2013 (61st)	Sharath Lohitashwa	Kaddipudi	Shankarappa	
2014 (62nd)	Achyuth Kumar ‡	Drishya	Surya Prakash	
2014 (62nd)	Harish Raj	Power	Shastry	
2014 (62nd)	Kishore	Ulidavaru Kandanthe	Munna	
2014 (62nd)	Thilak	Ugramm	Bala	
2014 (62nd)	V. Ravichandran	Maanikya	Adishesha	
2015 (63rd)	Saikumar Pudipeddi ‡	RangiTaranga	Thenkabail Ravindra "Kalinga" Bhat	
2015 (63rd)	Anant Nag	Vaastu Prakaara	Anantha Krishna	
2015 (63rd)	P. Ravi Shankar	Aatagara	Ravi Gowda	
2015 (63rd)	Ramakrishna	Raja Rajendra	Neelakanta Raju	
2015 (63rd)	Sundar	Naanu Avanalla...Avalu		
2016 (64th)	Vasishta N. Simha ‡	Godhi Banna Sadharana Mykattu	Ranga	
2016 (64th)	Achyuth Kumar	Kiragoorina Gayyaligalu	Shankara	
2016 (64th)	H. G. Dattatreya	Neer Dose	Dattatreya	
2016 (64th)	Roger Narayan	U Turn	Nayak	
2016 (64th)	Sadhu Kokila	Zoom	M.J.	
2017 (65th)	P. Ravishankar ‡	College Kumar	Shiva Kumar	
2017 (65th)	Achyuth Kumar	Beautiful Manasugalu	Inspector Kodanda	
2017 (65th)	Devaraj	Tarak	Tarak Ram	
2017 (65th)	H. G. Dattatreya	Kempirve		
2017 (65th)	Vasishta N. Simha	Dayavittu Gamanisi	Proxy	
2018 (66th)	Dhananjay ‡	Tagaru	Dolly	
2018 (66th)	Achyuth Kumar	Churikatte	Ravikanth	
2018 (66th)	Ashwin Rao Pallakki	Katheyondu Shuruvagide	Pedro	
2018 (66th)	P. Ravishankar	Raambo 2	Joker	
2018 (66th)	Radhakrishna Urala	Ammachi Yemba Nenapu	Puttamatte	
2019	AWARDS FUNCTION WAS SUSPENDED DUE TO COVID-19 PANDEMIC			
2020–2021 (67th)	B. Suresha ‡	Act 1978	Sharanappa	
2020–2021 (67th)	Achyuth Kumar	Bheemasena Nalamaharaja	Varadarajan Iyengar	
2020–2021 (67th)	Balaji Manohar	Amruth Apartments	Lakkappa Gowda	
2020–2021 (67th)	Dhananjaya	Salaga	ACP Samrat	
2020–2021 (67th)	Nagabhushana	Badava Rascal	Nagalinga	
2020–2021 (67th)	Pramod Panju	Rathnan Prapancha	Udaal Babu Rao	
2020–2021 (67th)	Sanchari Vijay	Gentleman	Inspector Shivmurthy	
2022 (68th)	Achyuth Kumar ‡	Kantara	Devendra Suttooru	
2022 (68th)	Ananth Nag	Gaalipata 2	Kishore	
2022 (68th)	Kishore	Kantara	Murali	
2022 (68th)	Nirup Bhandari	Vikrant Rona	Sanjeev Gambhira / Raghava	
2022 (68th)	Prakash Raj	KGF: Chapter 2	Vijayendra Ingalagi	
2023 (69th)	Rangayana Raghu ‡	Tagaru Palya	Chikka	
2023 (69th)	Nagabhushana	Kousalya Supraja Rama	Santhu	
2023 (69th)	Poornachandra Mysuru	Daredevil Musthafa	Sulthankeri Usman	
2023 (69th)	Rajesh Nataranga	19.20.21	Rafi	
2023 (69th)	Ramesh Indira	Sapta Saagaradaache Ello: Side A	Soma	
2024 (70th)	Gopalkrishna Deshpande ‡	Blink	Gopal Krishna	
2024 (70th)	Gopalkrishna Deshpande	Shakhahaari	Mallikarjuna Hiremath	
2024 (70th)	Jahangir M. S.	Photo	Husenappa	
2024 (70th)	Nagendra Shah	Maryade Prashne	Satisha's Father	
2024 (70th)	Prabhu Mundkur	Maryade Prashne	Rocky	
2024 (70th)	Prakash Raj	Bagheera	Guru	
2024 (70th)	Raj B. Shetty	Roopanthara	Goon	
