= Badava Rascal =

2021 Indian Kannada-language film

- Directed by: Shankar Guru
- Written by: Shankar Guru
- Produced by: Daali Dhananjaya
- Starring: Dhananjay; Amrutha Iyengar
- Cinematography: Preetha Jayaraman
- Edited by: Niranjan Devaramane
- Music by: Vasuki Vaibhav
- Production company: Daali Pictures
- Distributed by: KRG Studios
- Release dates: 24 December 2021 (Kannada); 18 February 2022 (Telugu & Tamil)
- Running time: 133 minutes
- Country: India
- Language: Kannada
- Box office: ₹ 16 crores

Badava Rascal is a 2021 Indian Kannada-language action comedy film written and directed by Shankar Guru in his directorial debut and produced by Dhananjay in his first production venture under Daali Pictures. Besides Dhananjay, the film stars Amrutha Iyengar, Rangayana Raghu, Nagabhushan and Tara in other pivotal roles. It was also dubbed and released in Tamil and Telugu on 18 February 2022. The film became commercial success at the Box office.

The plot is centered around a middle-class man named Shankar who gets abducted by a gang and forces them to rethink their decisions by narrating his life story which consists of friendship, love, breakup, family sentiments and life lessons. Vasuki Vaibhav scored music for the film, while Preetha Jayaraman served as the director of photography and Niranjan Devaramane as editor.

Badava Rascal was theatrically released on 24 December 2021, coinciding with Christmas holiday, where it received positive reviews from critics who highlighted the performances of Dhananjay and Rangayana Raghu, the musical score by Vasuki Vaibhav, while directing criticism at the film's length.

== Plot ==
Shankar alias "Badava Rascal" is an MBA graduate who lives life on his own terms. He thrashes some goons who work for a moneylender named Ganapa, when they were wreaking havoc at a roadside eatery, but was knocked out by one of the goons and is taken to their hideout along with his friend Nagalinga alias Naga. However, Ganapa and the gang apologize to Shankar and Naga after they saved the gang from a rival gang headed by Ganapa's friend Naveen alias "Down-to-Earth". The rival gangs compromise with each other and share their life stories with Shankar. Shankar also reveals details about himself; he lives happily with his friends and parents Rangegowda, an auto driver and mother Sharadamma, and also falls for Sangeetha, who is the daughter of an MLA candidate Premakumari, who accepts the proposal.

When Shankar and his parents arrive to meet Sangeetha, Sangeetha (who is at her room) insults Shankar and his parents for their lower class status and Shankar angrily leaves the house along with his parents. Shankar gets addicted to drinking due to their breakup. Days pass by, Shankar begins to learn about the value of his parents and becomes a better son to them. The goons are impressed by his life-story. Meanwhile, Ganapa and Down-to-Earth leave the hideout to meet their boss Manki Sudhi, where they learn that Premakumari actually warned Sangeetha to reject Shankar's proposal as she cannot kill him due to Elections. When Sangeetha refuses, Premakumari comes up with a plan to pretend to accept the proposal, and barges into Sangeetha's room and cuts her hair. Shocked and fearing for Shankar's life as her mother will not spare him, Sangeetha rejects the proposal.

Ganapa and Down-to-Earth sneak into Sangeetha's house where they hand her a phone and tell her that they will contact Shankar. Shankar gets enraged after learning about the incident. Sangeetha calls Shankar and tells her to take her away from her mother, Shankar agrees and challenges Premakumari that he will marry Sangeetha in her presence. Ganapa, Down-to-Earth along with their gang accompany Shankar to a playground where Premakumari is performing rituals for the construction of a site. A fight erupts between Shankar and Premakumari's newly appointed henchmen in which Shankar emerges victorious and reunites with Sangeetha. Premakumari realizes her mistakes and peacefully leaves. Shankar and Sangeetha finally get married in the presence of their parents and friends.

== Cast ==
- Dhananjay as Shankar
- Amrutha Iyengar as Sangeetha
- Nagabhushan as Nagalinga, Shankar's friend
- Rangayana Raghu as Rangegowda, Shankar's father
- Tara as Sharadamma, Shankar's mother
- Poornachandra Mysore as Ganapa
- Rekha as Premakumari, Sangeetha's mother
- Vijaya Prasad as Police Inspector
- Maasthi Manju
- Suresha Venkatesh

== Music ==
Badava Rascal

Soundtrack album by Vasuki Vaibhav
- Released: 9 October 2021
- Genre: Feature film soundtrack
- Language: Kannada
- Label: Anand Audio
External audio
- Official Audio Jukebox (Kannada) on YouTube
- Official Audio Jukebox (Telugu) on YouTube
- Official Audio Jukebox (Tamil) on YouTube

Vasuki Vaibhav scored background music for the film and its soundtrack.

Track listing (Kannada)
No.	Title	Lyrics	Singer(s)	Length
1.	"Udupi Hotelu"	Dhananjay	Vijay Prakash	3:16
2.	"Aagaaga Nenapaguthale"	Dhananjay	Vasuki Vaibhav	4:33
3.	"Nin Makke Benki Haaka"	Shankar Guru	Anthony Daasan	4:30
4.	"Badava Rascal"	Chethan Kumar	Sanjith Hegde	3:08
5.	"Theme Music"		Dhananjay, Amrutha Iyengar

Track listing (Telugu)
No.	Title	Lyrics	Singer(s)	Length
1.	"Cheliye Chandamamave"	Ram Vamsikrishna	Vijay Prakash	3:16
2.	"Aagagi Pola Maaruthonde"	Ram Vamsikrishna	Vasuki Vaibhav	4:33
3.	"Nee Notlo Mannupada"	Ram Vamsikrishna	Dhanunjay Seepana	4:30
4.	"Badava Rascal"	Chaitanya Prasad	Prudhvi Chandra	3:08

Track listing (Tamil)
No.	Title	Lyrics	Singer(s)	Length
1.	"Kiliye Vannak Kiliye"	Karthik Netha	Vijay Prakash	3:16
2.	"Aahasam Iragagi Poche"	Karthik Netha	Vasuki Vaibhav	4:33
3.	"Sang Onnu Oodiputta"	Karthik Netha	Anthony Daasan	4:30
4.	"Badava Rascal"	Karthik Netha	Vyasaraj Sosale	3:08

== Accolades ==
Awards	Category	Recipient	Result	Ref
10th South Indian International Movie Awards	Best Actor- Kannada	Dhananjay	Nominated	
10th South Indian International Movie Awards	Best Actress	Amrutha Iyengar	Nominated	
10th South Indian International Movie Awards	Critics' Best Actress	Amrutha Iyengar	Won	
10th South Indian International Movie Awards	Best Supporting Actor	Nagabhushan	Nominated	
10th South Indian International Movie Awards	Best Comedian	Rangayana Raghu	Nominated	
10th South Indian International Movie Awards	Best Debut Director	Shankar Guru	Won	
10th South Indian International Movie Awards	Best Debut Producer	Daali Pictures	Nominated	
10th South Indian International Movie Awards	Best Music Director	Vasuki Vaibhav	Nominated	
67th Filmfare Awards South
67th Filmfare Awards South	Best Film	Dhananjay	Nominated	
67th Filmfare Awards South	Best Director	Shankar Guru	Nominated	
67th Filmfare Awards South	Best Actor	Dhananjay	Won	
67th Filmfare Awards South	Best Actress	Amrutha Iyengar	Nominated	
67th Filmfare Awards South	Critics Best Actress – Kannada	Amrutha Iyengar	Won	
67th Filmfare Awards South	Best Supporting Actor	Nagabhushana	Nominated	
67th Filmfare Awards South	Best Music Director	Vasuki Vaibhav	Won	
67th Filmfare Awards South	Best Lyricist	Dhananjay ("Udupi Hotelu")	Nominated	
67th Filmfare Awards South	Best Male Playback Singer	Vijay Prakash ("Udupi Hotelu")	Nominated	
