= Avinash Chebbi =

Indian playback singer

Avinash Chhebi
- Occupations: Singer, Actor, television personality

Avinash Chebbi is an Indian playback and orchestra singer known for his works in Kannada. He has sung many hit songs in Kannada. Most popular song are from the movies of Murali Meets Meera and Sidlingu. Most of his songs are of 'melody' genre.

== Awards ==
- SIIMA award for "Nee Naadhe Naa" from Murali Meets Meera
- BIG Male Singer Award - BIG 92.7 FM for "Nee Naadhe Naa" from Murali Meets Meera
- Film Fare award for "Ellelo Oduva Manase" from Sidlingu. The music for this movie is composed by Anoop Seelin

He is the only Kannada singer who has received back to back awards for his first two songs.
