= Petromax (disambiguation) =

Petromax was a brand name for pressurised kerosene lamp.

Petromax may also refer to:

- Petromax (2019 film)
- Petromax (2022 film)
