= Dhairyam =

Dhairyam may refer to these in Indian cinema:

- Thairiyam, a 2010 Tamil film
- Dhairyam (2005 film), a 2005 Telugu film
- Dhairyam (2017 film), a 2017 Kannada film
