= Aditi Prabhudeva =

Indian actress (born 1994)

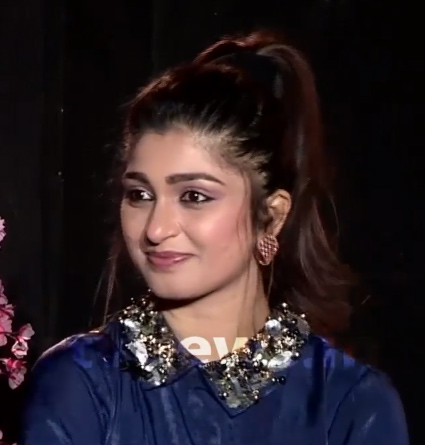
- Aditi in 2022
- Born: Sudeepana Banakar Prabhudeva; 13 January 1994 (age 32); Davanagere, Karnataka, India
- Education: BIET College Davangere
- Occupation: Actress
- Years active: 2017–present
- Spouse: Yashas Patla (m. 2022)
- Children: 1

Aditi Prabhudeva (born Sudeepana Banakar Prabhudeva; 13 January 1994), is an Indian actress and content creator who predominantly works in Kannada cinema. After debuting in television, she transitioned to films in 2017 with Dhairyam and rose to prominence with commercially and critically acclaimed performances in Bazaar, Sinnga, and Ranganayaki (all in 2019). She received the Chandanavana Film Critics Academy Award for Best Actress for the lattermost.

== Early and personal life ==
Aditi was born as Sudeepana Banakar Prabhudeva on 13 January 1994, in Davanagere, Karnataka. She is also an MBA Graduate from BIET College, Davanagere.

On 28 November 2022, Aditi married businessman Yashas Patla, at Bangalore Palace. The couple have a daughter, born in April 2024.

== Career ==
Aditi made her debut in Kannada cinema with the 2017 movie Dhairyam. However she came into limelight through the films Bazaar opposite debutant Dhanveerah directed by Simple Suni, Sinnga with Chiranjeevi sarja and the Ranganayaki where she played the lead the role. She further solidified her position in the industry with the Bramachari a comedy drama film. Her next film with MG Srinivas titled Old Monk which was released during the covid lockdown also turned out to be entertaining and good movie. She was then seen alongside Jaggesh in Totapuri though the film received mixed reviews, the songs from the film were a big hit.

She made her Marathi debut with the film Champion directed by Shahuraja Sindhe. Her next releases were Triple Riding with Ganesh, Totapuri Chapter 2 and Once Upon a Time in Jamaligudda opposite Dhananjaya.

== Media image ==
In the Bangalore Times Most Desirable Women list, Aditi was placed 28th in 2018 and 10th in 2019 and 2020.

== Filmography ==
=== Films ===
Key
†	Denotes films that have not yet been released

List of film performances
Year	Title	Role	Notes	Ref.
2017	Dhairyam	Parimala		
2019	Bazaar	Parijatha "Pari"		
2019	Operation Nakshatra	Roshni		
2019	Sinnga	Geetha		
2019	Ranganayaki	Ranganayaki		
2019	Brahmachari	Sunitha		
2021	Aana	Anarthya "Aana"		
2022	Ombattane Dikku	Saroja Devi		
2022	Old Monk	Abhighna		
2022	Gajanana and Gang	Sahitya		
2022	Totapuri: Chapter 1	Shakeela Banu		
2022	Champion	Rashi	Kannada-Marathi bilingual	
2022	Triple Riding	Ramya Shetty		
2022	Padavi Poorva			
2022	Once Upon a Time in Jamaligudda	Rukmini "Rukku"		
2023	Chaos	Bhoomika		
2023	Totapuri: Chapter 2	Shakeel Banu		
2024	Alexa	Alexa		
2024	5D			
2024	Matinee	Chithra		
2025	Choo Mantar	Akanksha / Clara		
2025	Andondittu Kaala	Vasundhara		
2025	Dilmaar	Akshara		
TBA	Mafia†	Shruthi	Completed	

=== Television ===
List of television performances
Year	Title	Role	Notes	Ref.
2016	Gundyan Hendti	Kamali		
2017-2018	Naaga Kannike	Shivani		
2019	Nammane Yuvarani		Cameo appearance	
2023	Love You Abhi	Abhi	Web series	

== Awards and nominations ==
Year	Award	Category	Work	Result	Ref.
2018	South Indian International Movie Awards	Best Female Debut – Kannada	Dhairyam	Nominated	
2019	Chandanavana Film Critics Academy Awards	Best Actress	Ranganayaki	Won	
