= Sidlingu 2 =

2025 Indian comedy drama film

- Theatrical release poster
- Directed by: Vijaya Prasad
- Written by: Vijaya Prasad
- Produced by: Srihari; Raju Shereghar
- Starring: Yogesh; Sonu Gowda; Suman Ranganathan
- Cinematography: Prasanna Guralakere
- Edited by: Akshay P. Rao
- Music by: J. Anoop Seelin
- Production company: Niharika Movies
- Release date: 14 February 2025
- Running time: 150 minutes
- Country: India
- Language: Kannada

Sidlingu 2 is a 2025 Indian Kannada-language comedy drama film written and directed by Vijaya Prasad. It is a sequel to the 2012 film Sidlingu, starring Yogesh reprising his role from the original, alongside Sonu Gowda and Suman Ranganathan.

The film was released on 14 February 2025 coinciding with Valentine's Day to mixed reviews.

== Plot ==
Sidlingu (Yogesh), once consumed by his obsession with vintage cars, now a rural schoolteacher who has lost nearly everything—his beloved car, his love interests Mangala and Andalamma, and much of his self‑belief. Feeling adrift and financially unstable, he accepts a lifeline from his boss, Arumugam, who gifts him a second‑hand car and a modest place to stay. As Sidlingu settles into this new chapter, he encounters Seethamma (Padmaja Rao), a compassionate grave‑digger, her family and her young daughter. Through small gestures—like offering Seethamma her favorite meal and ensuring proper rites for the departed—Sidlingu begins to rediscover empathy and responsibility, which slowly rebuild his character.

Parallel to this, he meets Niveditha (Sonu Gowda), an earnest government school teacher whose presence rekindles memories of Mangala. A romantic connection builds between them. However, destiny complicates matters when Sidlingu learns that the second‑hand car he now values so deeply actually belongs to Niveditha's father, Tiger Prabhakar (B. Suresha)—an obstacle that threatens both the romantic bond and his emotional resurgence.

The film accelerates into its climax with Sidlingu's internal conflict: will he reclaim the car and preserve his newfound meaning, or will he sacrifice material desire for emotional maturity? Along this journey, he also finds a religious turning point—unearthing an Ayyappa idol in the graveyard—which strengthens his resolve and provides spiritual clarity amid the legal and emotional turmoil. In the finale, Sidlingu's decisions reflect his transformed values: he balances his longing for the car with responsibility toward others—particularly Seethamma's daughter—and embraces a more grounded path of contentment alongside Niveditha. The car remains a potent metaphor for old desires, but through personal redemption, Sidlingu finds that deeper happiness lies beyond mere possessions.

== Cast ==
- Yogesh as Sidlingu
- Sonu Gowda as Nivedita
- Suman Ranganathan
- Manjunath Hegde as Seethamma's husband
- B. Suresha as Nivedita's father
- Seetha Kote
- Padmaja Rao as Seethamma

== Production ==
In September 2023, it was confirmed that Vijaya Prasad and Yogesh would collaborate on the sequel to Sidlingu, titled Sidlingu 2. Yogesh reportedly underwent a physical transformation, growing a beard and hair and gaining weight, to portray the role of Sidlingu. In March 2024, it was reported that Ramya would not be joining the cast of Sidlingu 2, as the role of Sumne didn't fit the story's narrative.

== Soundtrack ==
Sidlingu 2

Soundtrack album by J. Anoop Seelin
- Released: 2025
- Genre: Feature film soundtrack
- Length: 8:13
- Language: Kannada
- Label: MRT Music

J. Anoop Seelin chronology
Gana (2025)	Sidlingu 2 (2025)

The film has soundtrack composed by J. Anoop Seelin.

Track listing
No.	Title	Lyrics	Singer(s)	Length
1.	"Katheyondu"	Arasu Anthare	J. Anoop Seelin	4:05
2.	"Churmuri Tinkondu"	Nagarjun Sharma	Ananya Bhat, Karibasava Tadakal	4:08
Total length:				8:13

== Release ==
Sidlingu 2 was released theatrically on 14 February 2025, coinciding with Valentine's Day.

== Reception ==
A. Sharadhaa of The New Indian Express rated the film three out of five stars and wrote, "Despite some loose ends in the climax’s court scene and a few forced political and celebrity references, Sidlingu 2 offers an emotional rollercoaster, meditating on the nature of desires, materialism, and the deeper meaning of life." Y. Maheswara Reddy of Bangalore Mirror gave the film three out of five stars and wrote, "Vijaya Prasad has managed to keep this movie clean with no dirty dialogues." Shashiprasad SM of Times Now gave it two-and-a-half out of five stars and wrote, "There are a few moments that evoke memories of 2012 Sidlingu, but overall, the sequel’s car story remains stuck in second gear for most of the journey, failing to offer anything truly exciting."

Sridevi S. of The Times of India gave the film two-and-a-half out of five stars and wrote, "While Sidlingu 2 has flashes of brilliance and strong performances, its uneven screenplay and tonal inconsistency prevent it from reaching its full potential." Jagadish Angadi of Deccan Herald gave it two out of five stars and wrote, "After a promising start, the screenplay loses steam, and the narration becomes flawed. The story is dragged down by unnecessary elements, putting the audience’s patience to the test." Vivek M. V. of The Hindu wrote, "The background score, shot compositions, and production value resemble a television serial. Time and again, cinema has proven that it’s difficult for directors to bank on their past success. Sidlingu 2 is yet another example."
