= Mother Promise =

2026 Indian Kannada language film

- Poster
- Directed by: Poornachandra Mysore
- Written by: Poornachandra Mysore; Mahadev Prasad; Arun Bharamannavar
- Produced by: Harsha Murundi Shivalingappa; Dhananjaya Kalenahalli Adaviswamy
- Starring: Dhananjay; Poornachandra Mysore; Mahadev Prasad
- Cinematography: Rahul Roy
- Edited by: Pradeep Rao
- Music by: Navaneeth Sham
- Production company: Daali Pictures
- Release date: 10 July 2026
- Country: India
- Language: Kannada

Mother Promise is a 2026 Indian Kannada language film directed by Poornachandra Mysore. The film stars Dhananjay, Poornachandra Mysore, and Mahadev Prasad in the lead role.

== Cast ==
- Dhananjay as Rossi
- Poornachandra Mysore as Ryandi
- Mahadev Prasad as Donne Biriyani
- Chi. Guru Dutt as Maggie
- Yashwant Shetty
- Srivatsa Shyam
- Arun Brahmannavar
- Vinaya Prasad
- Geetha as Ryandi's mother
- Nagabhushana

== Reception ==
Vivek M. V. of The Hindu said that "Mother Promise is a coming-of-age tale of man-children who get schooled by a sensible teacher, convincing them to rethink their life choices. If the idea cracked you up, Mother Promise is for you." Amanda V. James of The Hollywood Reporter India "With its spot-on inside jokes, underrated one-liners and an all-round funny cast, Mother Promise ultimately leaves you hopeful for more such chuckles. And the laughs keep coming." A. Sharadhaa of The New Indian Express said that "It reminds us that no matter how loud life becomes, we eventually find ourselves returning to the promises we made to our mothers and the lessons our teachers left behind. The film begins with chaos, but it leaves you with a strong memory, and sometimes, that is the most meaningful promise a film can keep." Sanjay Ponnappa of the India Today said that "Whether it manages to replicate that journey remains to be seen, but it certainly has the ingredients to become a crowd favourite. When a film can make an entire theatre laugh together and walk out smiling, it has already achieved something special. Mother promise!"
