= Murali Meets Meera =

- Directed by: Mahesh Rao
- Produced by: Yogish Hunsur
- Starring: Prajwal Devaraj; Reema Vohra; Harshika Poonacha
- Cinematography: Jai Anand
- Music by: Abhiman Roy
- Release date: 22 April 2011
- Country: India
- Language: Kannada

Murali Meets Meera is a 2011 Kannada film in the romance genre starring Prajwal Devaraj and Reema Vohra in the lead roles . The film has been directed and written by director Mahesh Rao and produced by Yogish Hunsur. Abhiman Roy has composed the soundtrack and the background score. The film was released on 22 April 2011.

== Plot ==
The film is based on a novel love story with recession and its aftermath as the backdrop

== Cast ==
- Prajwal Devaraj as Murali
- Reema Worah as Meera
- Harshika Poonacha
- Sharan
- Achyuth Kumar
- P. N. Sathya
- Kaddipudi chandru
- Sadhu Kokila
- Neenasam Ashwath
- Shille Manjunath as Tea seller boy

== Awards ==
Karnataka State Film Awards: Best Female Dubbing Artist - Anushree

== Soundtrack ==
Abhiman Roy has composed the music for the film. The song "Neenadena" sung by Avinash Chebbi became sensational hit which was originally planned with a different style. Eventually the track song became the actual song winning many hearts. Another song "Ninna Mukha Nodi" became an anthem for all those in love.

Song title	Singers
"Neenadhe Naa"	Avinash Chebbi
"Ninna Mukha Nodi"	Rajesh Krishnan
"Ondu Chandra"	Ananya Bhagath, Bhadri Prasad
"Scenu Hodi"	G Erappa, L R Ramanujam, Ajneesh, Ritesh
"Baaninda Minchondu"	P. Kiran Sagar
"Neenadhe Naa"	Supriya Ramakrishnayya
"Your Eyes Are Lying"	Avinash Chebbi

== Reception ==
=== Critical response ===
A critic from The Times of India scored the film at 4 out of 5 stars and says "Full marks to Prajwal Devaraj for his brilliant performance. Reema Vohra is simply superb. Harshika shines. Music by Abhiman Roy and camera by Jai Anand are impressive". A critic from NDTV wrote "The highlight of the film is the climax and the sequences leading to it. Mahesh Rao has succeeded in narrating this important part of the film quite well". Shruti Indira Lakshminarayana from Rediff.com scored the film at 2 out of 5 stars and wrote "Abhiman Roy's music is soothing, but it is not compelling enough to make way into your mp3 players. Lighting and camera work add weightage to the film. Murli Meets Meera is a love story sans sleaze and compulsive romantic film watchers may consider giving the film a try". Sunayana Suresh from DNA wrote "One does get the feeling that there could’ve been someone more seasoned to carry off the multi-layered character of Meera, played by Reema, which would have clinched it for the film. The story is breezy and is quite Gen Next. Good music and a nice storyline - go for this one".
