= Totapuri: Chapter 2 =

Kannada language film directed by Vijay Prasad

- Directed by: Vijaya Prasad
- Written by: Vijaya Prasad
- Produced by: K. A. Suresh
- Starring: Jaggesh; Dhananjay; Aditi Prabhudeva; Suman Ranganathan
- Cinematography: Niranjan prabhu
- Music by: Arun Andrews; Hemanth Subrahmanya
- Production company: Monyplex Studios
- Release date: 28 September 2023
- Running time: 120 minutes
- Country: India
- Language: Kannada

Tothapuri: Chapter 2 (transl. Parrot Face: Chapter 2) is a 2023 Indian Kannada-language romantic comedy film, serving as a sequel to the movie Totapuri: Chapter 1. The film is written and directed by filmmaker Vijaya Prasad and produced by K A Suresh. It features a notable cast, including renowned actors Jaggesh, Dhananjay, Suman Ranganathan, and Aditi Prabhudeva.

== Cast ==
- Jaggesh as Eeregowda
- Dhananjay as Narayana Pillai
- Aditi Prabhudeva as Shakeela Banu
- Suman Ranganathan as Victoria
- H. G. Dattatreya
- Veena Sundar as ‘Donne’ Rangamma
- Hema Dutta as Nanjamma

== Reception ==
In his review for Bangalore Mirror, Y Maheswara Reddy awarded "Thothapuri Chapter 2" a rating of 3 out of 5 stars. He emphasized that beyond the humor, the film conveys an important message about communal harmony, making it a recommended choice for discerning viewers.

Vivek M. V., reviewing for The Hindu, stated that "Thothapuri: Chapter 2" redeems the series with a more mature storytelling approach, deeper character exploration, and tackling the conflict with a fresh character introduced by Dhananjaya. The film courageously addresses issues of religion and caste versus love and unity while maintaining candid conversations about sensitive topics like alcohol and sex. Prasad's potential to create impactful films is evident, provided he diversifies his storytelling beyond a single template.

Bharat Times reviewed "Thothapuri: Chapter 2" and found it to demonstrate an improved approach compared to its predecessor, offering a more balanced and less preachy take on its important theme. Director Vijay Prasad refines his storytelling by toning down the adult humor, becoming more of a storyteller, and delving deeper into character development. The film retains its focus on inclusivity but manages to avoid excessive lecturing, although it occasionally struggles with misplaced innuendos. Prasad's strength lies in portraying everyday people and challenging societal biases, making him a filmmaker unafraid to explore complex themes such as a Hindu-Muslim love story in contemporary times, as long as he diversifies his storytelling approach.
