= Ombattane Dikku =

Ombatthane Dikku
- Theatrical release poster
- Directed by: Dayal Padmanabhan
- Screenplay by: Dayal Padmanabhan
- Story by: Nithilan Saminathan
- Based on: Kurangu Bommai
- Produced by: Dayal Padmanabhan; K9 Studios
- Starring: Yogesh; Aditi Prabhudeva
- Narrated by: Darshan
- Cinematography: Rakesh B.
- Edited by: Preethi Mohan
- Music by: Manikanth Kadri
- Production companies: D Pictures; K9 Studios
- Release date: 28 January 2022
- Running time: 132 minutes
- Country: India
- Language: Kannada

Ombatthane Dikku (transl. The Ninth Direction) is a 2022 Indian Kannada-language crime thriller film directed and produced by Dayal Padmanabhan, starring Yogesh and Aditi Prabhudeva. The film is an official remake of the Tamil film Kurangu Bommai. It marks the second collaboration between director and Aditi Prabhudeva.

The film got positive reviews from both critics and audiences praise the movie for its unique narrative style and characterisation.

== Cast ==
- Yogesh as Channakeshava
- Aditi Prabhudeva as Saroja Devi
- Sai Kumar as Varadappa
- Ashok as Vasu
- Prashanth Siddi as Chintaka, thief
- Sampath Maitreya as Loki
- Ramesh Bhat as Murthy
- Mahesh as Giri, Varadappa henchman
- Sundar Veena as Saroja's father
- Shruthi Nayak as Channakeshava mother
- Rockline Sudhakar as Astologer
- Sonu Upadhyaya as Loki's wife
- Muni as Police Inspector
- Yatiraj as Police constable Ramesh

== Production ==
After Ranganayaki, director Dayal Padmanabhan brought remake rights of Tamil film Kurangu Bommai.

The film is made on the genre of action-thriller, starring Yogi and Aditi Prabhudeva, has a voiceover by Darshan. The film is produced by Dayal Padmanabhan's D Pictures in association with K 9 Studio and G Cinemas.

== Release ==
The film released on 28 January 2022 when the government gave permission to 50% occupation due to the coronavirus pandemic.

The film released on Amazon Prime Video in last week of March 2022.
