= Suman Ranganathan =

Indian actress

- Born: Bangalore, Karnataka, India
- Occupation: Actress
- Years active: 1989–present
- Spouses: Bunty Walia (m. 2005; div. 2007); Sajan Chinnappa (m. 2019)

Suman Ranganathan (or Suman Ranganath) is an Indian model and actress. She has starred in Kannada, Bengali, Tamil, Telugu, Malayalam and Hindi films.

== Personal life ==
She was married to Bunty Walia, an Indian film producer. The couple split in 2007. She married Sajan Chinnappa, a businessman from Kodugu district, Karnataka on 3 June 2019.

== Career ==
She made her acting debut with the Kannada movie C.B.I. Shankar (1989) with Shankar Nag. After the success of that movie, she starred in various Kannada movies like Bala Hombale (1989), Doctor Krishna (1989) Santha Shishunala Sharifa (1990) and Nammoora Hammera (1990).

In 1990, she made her Tamil debut with Pudhu Paattu. and went on to star in many Tamil movies like Perum Pulli (1991), Maanagara Kaaval (1991), Kurumbukkaran (1991), Unnai Vaazhthi Paadugiren (1992), Mettupatti Mirasu (1994) and Mudhal Udhayam (1995).

In 1996, she appeared in Fareb, her first Bollywood film, an Indian adaptation of Unlawful Entry. She went on to star in many Hindi films after that including Aa Ab Laut Chalen and Baghban. In 2003 Suman claimed that she had been impersonated by a body double in some shots of Ek Stree.

Ranganath was also in a team of judges for the Mr India World 2007. She is the judge of Kannada reality show Thakadimitha, which airs on Colors Kannada.

After 2007 she mainly starred in Kannada movies. She made a comeback in Tamil movies after 18 years in Arrambam (2013), essaying the role of a tough journalist.

Suman Ranganathan has acted in many successful projects, and she contributed to the success of many movies such as Neer Dose (2016) and Kavaludaari (2019). The film has been remade in Tamil titled Kabadadaari (2021) and in Telugu titled Kapatadhaari (2021). She played a pivotal role in the Kannada action comedy film, Home Minister (2022). His next five films were comedies, all directed by Vijaya Prasad such as Petromax (2022), Thotapuri (2022), Thothapuri: Chapter 2 (2023) and Sidlingu 2 (2025).

== Filmography ==
Year	Movie	Role	Language	Notes
1989	C.B.I. Shankar	Asha	Kannada	
1989	Doctor Krishna	Swati	Kannada	
1989	Bala Hombale	Radha	Kannada	
1990	Santha Shishunala Sharifa	Fatima	Kannada	
1990	Nammoora Hammera	Radha	Kannada	
1990	Kempu Surya	Triveni	Kannada	
1990	20va Sathabdam		Telugu	
1990	Pudhu Paattu	Raji	Tamil	
1990	Padmavathi Kalyanam	Padmavathi	Telugu	
1991	Perum Pulli		Tamil	
1991	Maanagara Kaaval	Vidya	Tamil	
1991	Kurumbukkaran		Tamil	
1992	Unnai Vaazhthi Paadugiren	Priya	Tamil	
1992	Ellarum Chollanu	Archana	Malayalam	
1994	Mettupatti Mirasu	Radha	Tamil	
1995	Mudhal Udhayam	Geetha	Tamil	
1996	Fareb	Suman Varma	Hindi	
1997	Ankhon Mein Tum Ho	Pooja	Hindi	
1997	Achena Atithi	Pooja	Bengali	
1998	O Gandasare Neevestu Oleyavaru	Janaki	Kannada	
1998	Hatyara	Suman	Hindi	
1999	Aa Ab Laut Chalen	Loveleen	Hindi	
2000	Ek Stree	Vaishali	Hindi	
2000	Badal	Herself	Hindi	Special appearance
2001	Bava Nachadu	Suma	Telugu	
2001	Aaghaaz	Pushpa	Hindi	
2001	Kurukshetra	Herself	Hindi	Special appearance
2001	Hadh		Hindi	
2001	Mujhe Meri Biwi Se Bachaao	Anuradha	Hindi	
2001	Hum Ho Gaye Aapke	Nikki	Hindi	
2002	Hum Tumhare Hain Sanam	Nita	Hindi	
2003	Market	Lisa	Hindi	
2003	Baghban	Kiran	Hindi	
2004	Ishq Qayamat	Suman	Hindi	
2005	Sauda		Hindi	
2006	Devaki	Devaki	Hindi	
2006	Purab Aur Paschim		Bhojpuri	
2008	Bindaas	Herself	Kannada	Special appearance in the song "Kalu Mama"
2008	Mehbooba		Hindi	
2008	Budhivanta	Monika	Kannada	
2008	Gumnaam – The Mystery	Remon	Hindi	
2008	Mast Maja Maadi	Herself	Kannada	Special appearance
2009	Anjadiru		Kannada	
2009	Savaari		Kannada	Nominated—Filmfare Award for Best Supporting Actress – Kannada
2009	Kalaakaar		Kannada	
2009	Harikathe		Kannada	
2009	IPC Section 300	Sheela	Kannada	
2010	Antharathma		Kannada	Special appearance in a song
2012	Sidlingu	Aandalamma	Kannada	Filmfare Award for Best Supporting Actress – Kannada
2012	Shiva	Herself	Kannada	Special appearance
2012	Katari Veera Surasundarangi	Herself	Kannada	Special appearance
2013	Galaate		Kannada	
2013	Myna	Geetha	Kannada	
2013	Jinke Mari	Herself	Kannada	Special appearance in the song "Bangaara Petege"
2013	Arrambam	Ramya	Tamil	
2016	Deal Raja		Kannada	
2016	Neer Dose	Sharada Mani	Kannada	Nominated—Filmfare Award for Best Supporting Actress – Kannada; Nominated—SIIMA Award for Best Actress in a Supporting Role
2017	Aadu Aata Aadu		Kannada	
2018	Double Engine	Suma	Kannada	
2019	Kavaludaari	Madhuri	Kannada	
2019	Dandupalya 4	Sundri	Kannada	
2019	Ladies Tailor		Kannada	
2021	Kabadadaari	Ramya	Tamil	
2021	Kapatadhaari	Ramya	Telugu	
2022	Home Minister		Kannada	
2022	Petromax	Subbalakshmi	Kannada	
2022	Thotapuri: Chapter 1	Victoria	Kannada	
2023	Thothapuri: Chapter 2	Victoria	Kannada	
2025	Sidlingu 2		Kannada	
