= Love You Abhi =

Indian drama television series

- Title card
- Genre: romance drama
- Written by: Kaali Velayudham
- Directed by: Kaali Velayudham
- Starring: Vikram Ravichandran; Aditi Prabhudeva
- Composer: Nijil Dhinakar
- Country of origin: India
- Original language: Kannada
- No. of seasons: 1
- No. of episodes: 7

Production
- Producer: Kaali Velayudham
- Cinematography: Arun Brahma
- Editor: Pradeep E. Ragav
- Camera setup: Multi-camera
- Running time: 20–36 minutes
- Production company: Galatta Media Private Limited

Original release
- Network: JioCinema
- Release: 19 May 2023

Love You Abhi is a 2023 Indian Kannada-language romance drama television series produced under the banner of Galatta Media Private Limited and premiered on JioCinema on 19 May 2023. The series features Vikram Ravichandran as Shiva and Aditi Prabhudeva as Abhi in lead roles.

== Cast ==
- Vikram Ravichandran as Shiva
- Aditi Prabhudeva as Abhi
- Srinath as Abhi's father-in-law
- Ambika as Abhi's mother-in-law
- Sundar Raj as Abhi's father
- Vinaya Prasad as Abhi's mother
- P. Ravishankar as Shiradi Shekar
- Lisha as Shiradi Shekar's wife
- Kempegowda as Jagadeesh
- Srinivasa Murthy as IG
- Ashok Sharma as DK
- Rachitha Mahalakshmi as Prema
- Chaitra Reddy as Lawyer
- Prithvik S as Baby Ishaan
- Abhilash Gowda as Head Constable
- Chandhranna as Constable
- Abhi Guru as Sub Inspector

== Production ==
In 2023, the series was announced for JioCinema consisting of seven episodes featuring Vikram Ravichandran and Aditi Prabhudeva.

== Reception ==
A Sharadhaa of Cinema Express awarded the series 2/5 stars. Pranati A S of Deccan Herald gave the series 2/5 stars. Swaroop Kodur of OTTPlay rated the series 2.5/5 stars.
