= Sidlingu =

- Theatrical poster
- Directed by: Vijaya Prasad
- Written by: Vijaya Prasad
- Produced by: T. P. Siddaraju
- Starring: Yogesh; Ramya; Suman Ranganathan
- Cinematography: Sugnan (Gnana Murthy)
- Edited by: Akshay P Rao
- Music by: Anoop Seelin
- Production company: Samy Associates Akshaya Audio
- Distributed by: Jayanna Films
- Release date: 13 January 2012
- Running time: 2 hours 15 minutes
- Country: India
- Language: Kannada

Sidlingu is a 2012 Indian Kannada-language coming of age film directed and written by Vijaya Prasad and starring Yogesh and Ramya in the lead roles.

Prasad makes his big screen debut after directing many TV series. The film is produced by Yogesh's father, T. P. Siddaraju of Duniya fame. Anoop Seelin has composed the music. Sugnan aka Gnana Murthy was the cinematographer. The film was released on 13 January 2012.

== Plot ==
Sidlingu has a passion for cars since his childhood and gets closer to a young girl and a middle-aged lecturer because of his desire to own a car. But the lecturer, who gives him lift, seduces him. Later Sidlingu moves to Srirangapatna where he finds one vintage car and wants to purchase it. There he meets schoolteacher Mangala who helps him to realise his dreams. Sidlingu even expresses his desire to marry Mangala, but she keeps mum as she feels Sidlingu is an innocent and infatuated youngster. Later tragedy strikes and robs Sidlingu off Mangala.

== Cast ==
- Yogesh as Sidlingu
- Ramya as Mangala
- Suman Ranganathan as Aandalamma
- K. S. Sridhar as Asadullah Baig
- Girija Lokesh as Rangamma
- Achyuth Kumar as Appaji Gowda
- Chaswa as Jamaal alias biryani
- Mimicry Dayanand
- Amarnath Aaradhya
- Mimicry Gopi
- Srikanth Heblikar
- HMT Vijay
- Nagaraj Gowda
- Vatsala Mohan
- Kaddipudi Chandru
- Shankar Rao
- Kempegowda
- Shashikala
- Harshith Gowda

== Production ==
Actress Ramya is noted for an image makeover in this film playing the role of Mangala, a middle-class school teacher portraying the role of a woman who is behind the success of a man in the film.

== Soundtrack ==
The much-hyped audio of ‘Sidlingu’ was released on 29 November 2011 at Srinivasa Theatre, Gowdana Palya which was attended by Kannada film personalities such as Raghavendra Rajkumar, Prajwal Devaraj, Diganth, Jaggesh and Duniya Vijay.

The song "Ellello Oduva Manase" sung by Avinash Chebbi became a big hit and considered to be an evergreen song.

All music is composed by J. Anoop Seelin.

| No. | Title | Lyrics | Singer(s) | Length |
|---|---|---|---|---|
| 1. | "Achachhu Beladachhu" | Arasu Anthare | Kunal Ganjawala, Sriraksha Krishnamurthy |
| 2. | "Barbhad Building" | Vijayaprasad | Puneeth Rajkumar |
| 3. | "Chombo Chombu" | Arasu Anthare | Kailash Kher, Anuradha Bhat |
| 4. | "Ellello Oduva Manase" | Arasu Anthare | Avinash Chebbi |
| 5. | "Ellello Oduva Manase" | Arasu Anthare | Anuradha Bhat |
| Total length: | | | | 21 |

== Reception ==
=== Critical response ===
A critic from The New Indian Express wrote "Anup Silin has provided lilting music. It is certainly worth watching till intermission. One needs a little bit extra patience to sit through its second half". A critic from News18 India wrote "The rural situations look natural and real thanks to the work done by art director. 'Sidlingu' is a better presented with a good performance from young hero Yogish". Shruti I L from DNA wrote "Anoop Seelin’s music, especially in the song Ellelo oduva manase… is worth a mention. Sidlingu held all the possibilities of soaring high but it falls short, leaving you asking for more". A critic from Bangalore Mirror wrote "What could have been another film in the genre of Mera Naam Joker and My Autograph ends up being pathetically ordinary. But for the twist in the last 10 seconds, the audience would have felt cheated by the trailers".

== Awards ==
| Ceremony | Category | Nominee | Result | Ref. |
|---|---|---|---|---|
| 60th Filmfare Awards South | Best Film | T. P. Siddaraju | Nominated | |
| 60th Filmfare Awards South | Best Director | Vijaya Prasad | Won | |
| 60th Filmfare Awards South | Best Actor | Yogesh | Nominated | |
| 60th Filmfare Awards South | Best Actress | Ramya | Nominated | |
| 60th Filmfare Awards South | Best Supporting Actress | Suman Ranganathan | Won | |
| 60th Filmfare Awards South | Best Music Director | Anoop Seelin | Nominated | |
| 60th Filmfare Awards South | Best Playback Singer - Male | Avinash Chebbi ("Ellello Oduva Manase") | Won | |
| 60th Filmfare Awards South | Best Playback Singer – Female | Anuradha Bhat ("Ellello Oduva Manase") | Nominated | |
| 2nd South Indian International Movie Awards | Best Actress | Ramya | Nominated | |
| 2nd South Indian International Movie Awards | Best Music Director | Anoop Seelin | Nominated | |
| 2nd South Indian International Movie Awards | Best Female Playback Singer | Anuradha Bhat ("Ellelo Oduva") | Nominated | |

== Sequel ==
A sequel titled Sidlingu 2 was released on 14 February 2025.
