= Bapuji Institute of Engineering & Technology =

Engineering college in Karnataka, India

Bapuji Institute of Engineering and Technology
- Motto: Sanskrit: Karmanaiv hi Samsiddihi
- Motto in English: enlightenment only in the work
- Type: Autonomous engineering and technology institute
- Established: 1979
- Affiliations: Visvesvaraya Technological University
- Principal: Dr.Aravind H.B.
- Administrative staff: ~300
- Undergraduates: ~3000
- Postgraduates: ~250
- Location: Davanagere, Karnataka, India; 14°26′37.2″N 75°54′12.8″E
- Campus: 61.5 acres (0.2 km^{2})
- Approvals: AICTE
- Website: Official Site

Bapuji Institute of Engineering and Technology, Davangere (BIET) is an Engineering and Technology institute located in the city of Davangere, Karnataka, India. The college houses around 18 different departments. It offers Bachelor of Engineering (B.E) in 12 Engineering Disciplines, Master of Technology in 5 specializations, Master of Computer Applications and Master of Business Administration degrees. Thirteen of its departments have been recognized as research centers and 12 departments have been accredited by National Board of Accreditation, New Delhi. It began offering courses from the academic year 1979-1980 and is affiliated to Visvesvaraya Technological University (VTU).

== Location ==
The city of Davangere is the district headquarters of Davangere district with an urban population of 364,000 situated in the heart of Karnataka state. Davangere is well connected by both rail and road. National Highway 4 connecting Mumbai and Chennai runs through this city just beside the college. It is 265 km away from Bangalore and 255 km away from Belgaum and 140 km away from Hubli.

== College fest ==
Every year the college holds the annual fest by name Davana with various competitions held across different streams and with active participation from different Engineering colleges across the state. The festival is of 3 days duration and is usually concluded at the evening of the third day with a grand cultural extravaganza. The college publishes its own yearly student magazine by the name "Technowave".

== Notable alumni ==
- Captain Naveen Nagappa, Indian Army officer, Kargil War veteran

== See also ==
- Davanagere
