= Gajanana and Gang =

Indian Kannada film

- Directed by: Abhishek Shetty
- Produced by: Nagesh Kumar U S
- Starring: Shri Mahadev; Aditi Prabhudeva
- Edited by: Vijeth Chandra
- Music by: Praddyottan
- Release date: 3 June 2022
- Country: India
- Language: Kannada

Gajanana and Gang is a 2022 Indian Kannada-language romantic drama film directed by Abhishek Shetty and starring Shri Mahadev and Aditi Prabhudeva. The music was composed by Praddyottan.

== Cast ==
- Shri Mahadev as Gajendra (Gaja)
- Aditi Prabhudeva as Sahithya
- Chethan Durga as Mounesh
- Abhishek Shetty as Vishnu
- Shamanth Gowda
- Raghu Gowda

== Release ==
The film was released on 3 June 2022. It was initially set for release on 4 February 2022 but was later it was postponed due to the COVID-19 pandemic.
