= Ranganayaki (2019 film) =

2019 Kannada-language film

- Theatrical Poster
- Directed by: Dayal Padmanabhan
- Written by: Dayal Padmanabhan
- Produced by: S. V. Narayan
- Starring: Aditi Prabhudeva; MG Srinivas; Trivikram
- Cinematography: Rakesh B.
- Edited by: Sunil Kashyap H. N.
- Music by: Manikanth Kadri
- Production company: S. V. Entertainment
- Release date: November 1, 2019
- Country: India
- Language: Kannada

Ranganayaki is a 2019 Indian Kannada drama film written and directed by Dayal Padmanabhan. The film was produced by S. V. Narayan under his banner S.V. Entertainment. It features Aditi Prabhudeva and MG Srinivas along with Trivikram, who is making his debut in the lead roles. The supporting cast includes Lasya Nagraj, Suchendra Prasad and Chakravthy Chandrachud. The score and soundtrack for the film is by Manikanth Kadri and the cinematography is by Rakesh B. The editing of the film was done by Sunil Kashyap H. N. The film before getting released was selected to the Panorama Section of the 50th International Film Festival of India (IFFI), and is the only Kannada film that has been selected.

== Cast ==
- Aditi Prabhudeva as Ranganayaki
- MG Srinivas as Krishna
- Trivikram as Madhav
- Lasya Nagraj
- Suchendra Prasad
- Chakravarthy Chandrachud
- Sundar Raj

== Production and release ==
The film was announced on 28 March 2019. The principal photography of the film began on 26 April 2019. The film features Aditi Prabhudeva as the lead along with MG Srinivas and Trivikram. Manikanth Kadri scored the film. The film was selected for the Panorama Section of 50th International Film Festival of India (IFFI). The film was released on November 1, 2019, on account of Kannada Rajyotsava.

== Soundtrack ==
Ranganayaki

Soundtrack album by Manikanth Kadri
- Genre: Feature film soundtrack
- Language: Kannada
- Label: Anand Audio
- Producer: S. V. Narayan

The film's background score and the soundtracks were composed by Manikanth Kadri. The music rights were acquired by Ananda Audio.

Tracklist
No.	Title	Lyrics	Singer(s)	Length
1.	"Seetha Kalyana"	Tyaagaraaja, Vinay Pandupura	Srivinas	3:28
2.	"Adharam Madhuram"	Vallabhaacharya	Shwetha Prabhu, Shashank Sheshagiri	4:17
3.	"Krishna Nee Brgane Baro"	Vyasathirtha	Ananya Bhagat	2:48

== Awards and nominations ==
Ranganayaki is the only Kannada film to make it to the 50th edition of the International Film Festival of India (IFFI) in the year 2019.
