= J. Anoop Seelin =

Indian film music director and playback singer

- Born
- Origin: Hassan district, Karnataka, India
- Occupations: Music composer, singer
- Years active: 1998–present (singing); 2008–present (composing)

J. Anoop Seelin is an Indian film music director and playback singer primarily associated with the Kannada film industry. He has composed musical scores for films including Gooli, Eddelu Manjunatha, I Am Sorry Mathe Banni Preethsona, Sidlingu, Parari, Madarangi, Naanu Avanalla...Avalu, and Aatagara.

Seelin received the Karnataka State Film Award for Best Music Director for his work in Sidlingu.

== Early life and education ==
J. Anoop Seelin was born in Hassan, Karnataka. After completing his early education in Hassan, he and his family moved to Bangalore to explore better opportunities. Seelin later earned an LLB degree and initially pursued a career in law.

== Career ==
Seelin's musical journey began in Bangalore, where he performed as a singer with various bands. In 1999, he began working as a chorus singer under the mentorship of Hamsalekha, a prominent figure in the Kannada music industry. Over six years, he gained experience singing track songs for Hamsalekha's compositions, which laid the foundation for his career in playback singing.

Seelin's notable playback singing work includes songs from films like Ondagona Baa, Sarvabhoma, Madana, Dharma, Nenapirali, and Sixer.

=== Vocal performance ===
His first vocal performance "Yaaro Yaaro" in the movie Ondagona Baa, followed by songs from movies like Sarvabhoma, Madana, Dharma, Janapada, Nenapirali, Sixer, and Thaballi.

=== Music composition ===
Seelin debuted as a composer with the film Gooli, followed by work on Eddelu Manjunatha. Subsequent projects included I Am Sorry Mathe Banni Preethsona, which received critical acclaim for its background score, and Sidlingu. For the final score, he won the Karnataka State Film Award for Best Music Director.

Other notable films in his career include Madarangi and Aatagara. Seelin continues to contribute to Kannada cinema, composing music across a range of genres.

== Awards and recognition ==
Anoop Seelin has received numerous awards for his versatile singing.

The Government of Karnataka announced the Karnataka State Film Awards for 2010–11; Seelin was named Best Music Director for composing music for the movie Sidlingu. The jury was headed by the noted Kannada movie director Sunil Kumar Desai.

== Discography ==
Year	Film	Notes
2008	Gooli	
2009	Eddelu Manjunatha	
2009	Preethse Preethse	
2010	Yaksha	
2011	I Am Sorry Mathe Banni Preethsona	
2011	Manasology	
2011	Galla	
2012	Sidlingu	Winner – Karnataka State Film Award for Best Music Director; Nominated – SIIMA Award for Best Music Director; Nominated – Filmfare Award for Best Music Director – Kannada
2012	Janma	
2013	Parari	
2013	Madarangi	
2013	B3	
2013	Director's Special	
2013	Googly	Background music
2014	Rose	
2014	Love in Mandya	
2014	Goli Soda	Tamil film; Background score only
2015	Bhagyaraj	
2015	Aatagara	
2015	10 Endrathukulla	Tamil film; Background score only
2015	Naanu Avanalla...Avalu	
2016	Brahma Vishnu Maheshwara	
2016	Jessie	
2016	Nataraja Service	
2016	Neer Dose	
2017	Kadugu	Tamil film; Background score
2017	Smile Please	
2017	Chowka	
2017	Eradane Sala	
2017	Bangalore Underworld	
2017	Eleyaru Naavu Geleyaru	
2017	Siliconn City	
2017	Dada is Back	
2017	Dayavittu Gamanisi	Also co-producer Nominated – Filmfare Award for Best Music Director – Kannada
2017	Kaafi Thota	1 song only
2018	Najundi Kalyana	
2018	Huccha 2	
2019	Kalbetada Darodekoraru	
2019	Rustum	
2019	Yaanaa	Background score only
2021	Inspector Vikram	
2022	Monsoon Raaga	
2022	Sugarless	
2022	Bairagee	50th Film
2022	Petromax	
2022	Totapuri: Chapter 1	
2022	Ranganayaka	
2022	Thimayya & Thimayya	
2024	The Judgement	
2024	Mafia	
2024	Kaalapatthar	
2025	Gana	
2025	Sidlingu 2	
2025	Raju James Bond	
2025	Unlock Raghava	
