= Dhananjaya (actor) =

Indian actor, lyricist, film producer (born 1985)

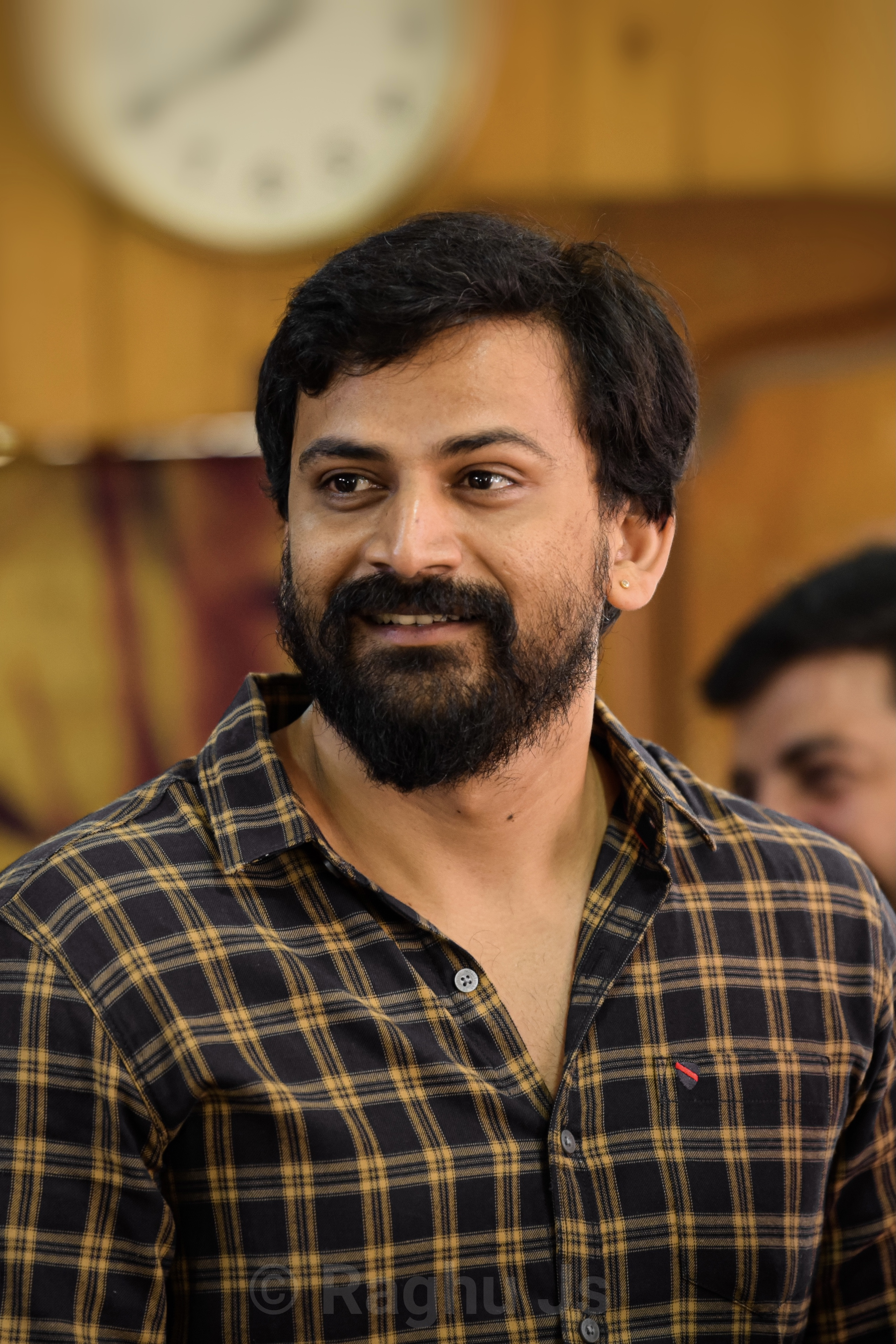
- Dhananjaya in 2014
- Born: Kalenahalli Adaviswamy Dhananjaya; 23 August 1985 (age 41); Kalenahalli, Arasikere taluk, Hassan, Karnataka, India
- Other name: Daali
- Education: Sri Jayachamarajendra College of Engineering
- Occupations: Actor; lyricist; film producer
- Years active: 2007–present
- Spouse: Dhanyatha (m. 2025)
- Children: 1

Kalenahalli Adaviswamy Dhananjaya, also known as Daali, is an Indian actor and producer who predominantly works in Kannada and Telugu films. Dhananjaya made his acting debut in Director's Special (2013) for which he won the best debut actor award at the SIIMA Awards.He has won three Filmfare Awards South and four South Indian International Movie Awards for his performances in various films He was critically acclaimed for playing the role of Allama Prabhu in Allama (2017). He turned producer through the film Badava Rascal.

Dhananjaya got his major breakthrough in the 2018 film Tagaru directed by Duniya Soori for his performance as a menacing villain. He is now popularly addressed as "Daali", the character name in the film.

== Early life and family ==
Dhananjaya was born on 23 August 1985 in Kalenahalli, Arsikere taluka, Hassan district. He excelled in studies and secured top marks for the whole of Hassan District once when he was in 7th standard and then again in 10th standard. He says he grew up watching Dr. Rajkumar movies and hence he started acting in dramas, mono-acting competitions and street plays while he was still in school.

Dhananjaya then moved to Mysore for higher studies and having completed his PUC in Marimallappa College, he secured an engineering seat in one of the reputed engineering colleges in Mysore, SJCE. He even got a job in a software company, Infosys. However, he started taking acting more seriously and joined an amateur theatre group called GPIER which was headed and mentored by a senior Rangayana artist named Mime Ramesh. He was also recognized and mentored by Germany theatre artist Christian Stückl in Germany. During one of his performances in a drama, he was recognised by popular Kannada director Guruprasad and was offered a lead role in a feature film. Thus began his career in films.

He married Dhanyatha, a physician, on 16 February 2025. They have one child together, a son born in 2026.

== Film career ==
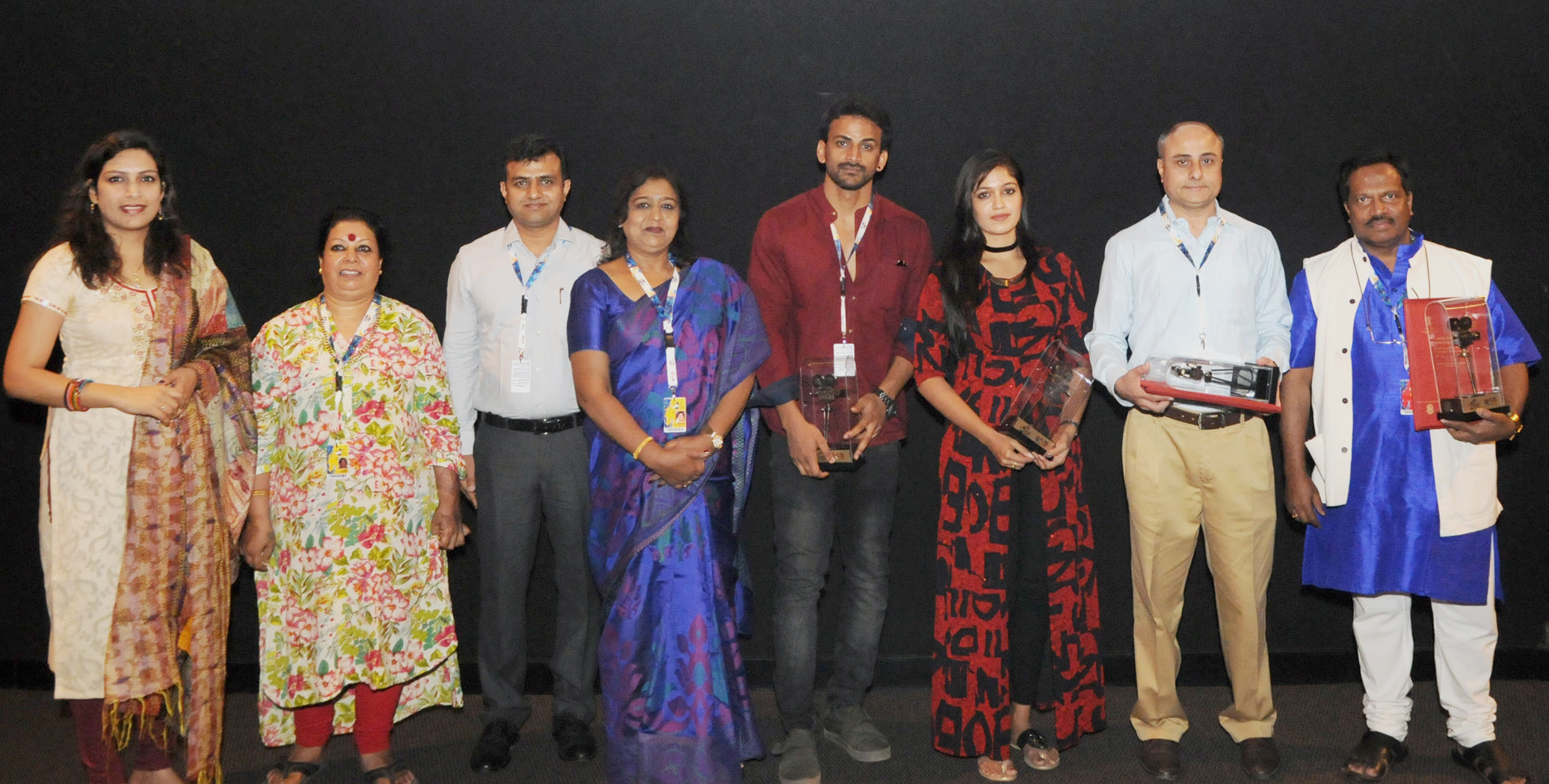
Dhananjaya with the cast and crew at the presentation of the film 'Allama', during the 47th International Film Festival of India (IFFI-2016), in Panaji, Goa on 26 November 2016.

=== Early years (2013–2017) ===
Dhananjaya appeared in a Kannada short film on YouTube called Jayanagar 4th Block which has over 2.5 million views as of 2022. Dhananjaya was offered a lead role in Guruprasad's feature film Director's Special. The film took three years in the making and was finally released in 2013 to mixed and negative responses at the box office. Dhananjaya was lauded for his performance and won the best debut actor award at the 3rd SIIMA Awards for the same. Many prominent filmmakers approached him for the roles in their films. He was then cast in A. P. Arjun's next film Rhaatee opposite Shruthi Hariharan under musician V. Harikrishna's debut production. His next was Preetham Gubbi's film Boxer, produced under Jayanna Films banner, which brought him wide accolades. He was known for his fit boxer's body, which he had achieved by rigorous training. He was then offered a role by National award-winning director T. S. Nagabharana for the film Allama which is based on the life of 12th century saint poet Allama Prabhu. Dhananjaya underwent harsh training to master the musical instrument Mridanga and also the classical dance for the role and received great reviews for his performance. Although his movies did not make a big impact on the box office collection, he constantly received good reviews from the audience and critics for his acting skills.

=== Daali and success (2018–present) ===
His biggest breakthrough came when he was offered a negative role named "'Daali" opposite Shiva Rajkumar In Tagaru directed by Duniya Suri. Director Suri has shared that he was a bit hesitant to offer negative role to Dhananjaya as he was always playing good deed doing lead (or hero) roles in his previous movies and was pleasantly surprised when he accepted the offer. The film opened with very good reviews and was declared a huge hit in terms of box office collection. Dhananjaya's acting as a menacing villain won him accolades across the film fraternity, critics and the audience. The role earned him nicknames such as "Nataraakshasa", "Nata bhayanakara", "Daali" etc. He is currently one of the most sought-after actors who is seen as a capable lead to play both antagonist and protagonist roles. After this movie, he has played many roles with leading actors in the Kannada film industry such as Darshan in Yajamana, Puneeth Rajkumar in Yuvarathna and Duniya Vijay in Salaga as well as paving the way to receive offers for films in other languages.

He then starred in the film Rathnan Prapancha directed by Rohit Padaki and produced by KRG Studios which was their maiden production venture. The film had a direct OTT Release on Amazon prime and received positive reviews and deemed a blockbuster.

== Production and other work ==
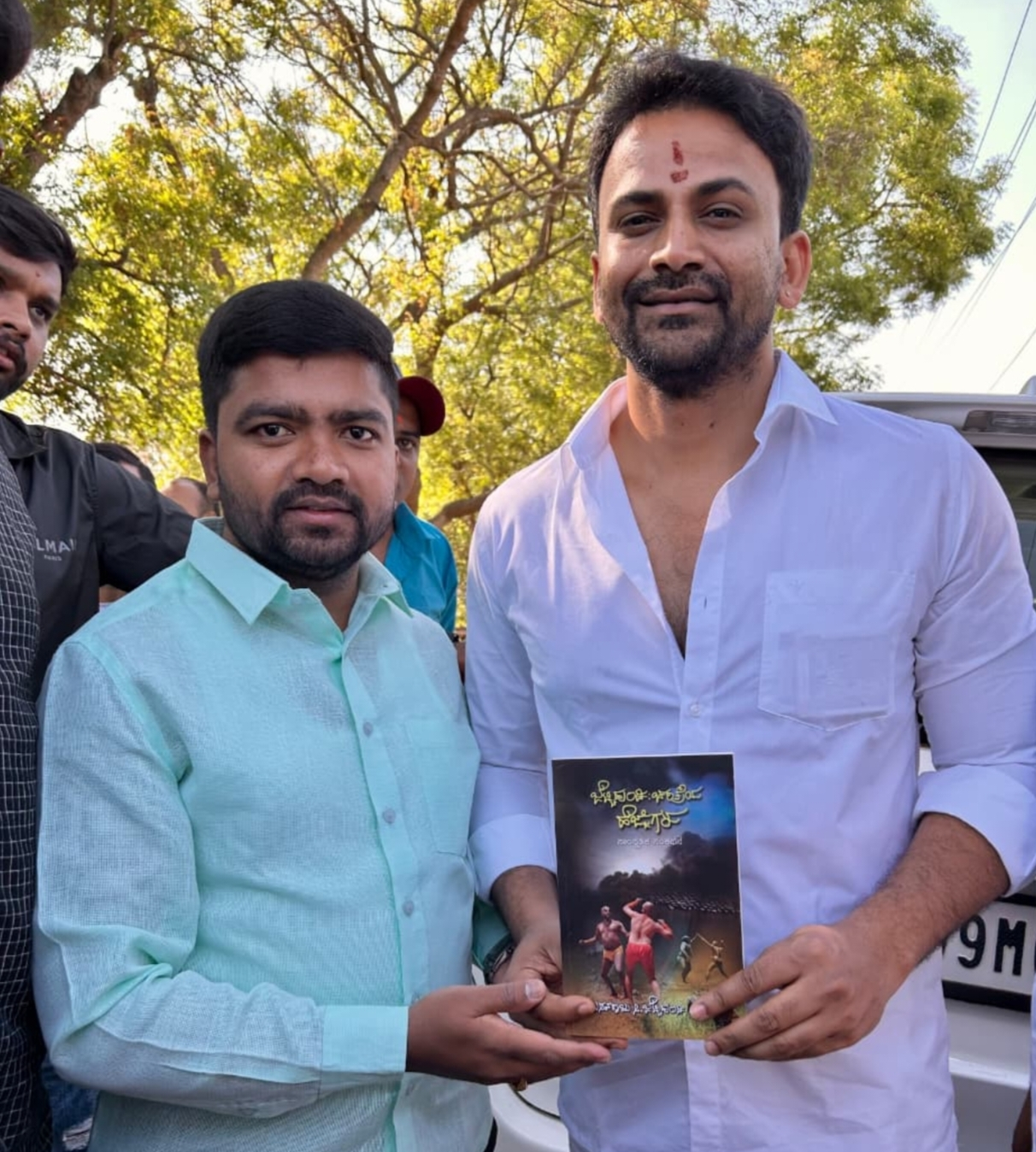

Riding on the success of his acting career in Sandalwood, Dhananjaya has set up his own production house Daali Pictures named after his popular character Daali. Badava Rascal - A Kannada film, marked Dhananjaya's entry into the journey as a producer under his home banner. The film directed by Debutant Shankar Guru opened to positive to mixed reviews but became a sleeper hit at the box office. His next production venture was named Head Bush directed by Debutant Shoonya and story by Agni Shridhar under his home banner Daali Pictures. The film based on the life-story of Bangalore's infamous underworld don - Jayaraj. The film opened to mixed reviews and fared averagely at the box office and attracted controversy over the Veeragase scene in the movie. His third production was Tagarupalya, a rural comedy drama movie directed by Debutant Umesh Krupa, starring Nagabushana, Debutante Amrutha Prem, Rangayana Raghu and others. The movie opened to positive to mixed reviews and performed decently at the box office.

Dhananjaya has also penned for songs in movies that he has starred in as well as other indie films. The Kannada film Orchestra Mysuru- a first production venture by musician Raghu Dixit being one of his first as a lyricist in Kannada film industry. He has also written multiple songs for his production movies Badava Rascal, Head Bush, Tagru Palya among which many of them were a huge hit.

He also penned few lines for the movie Daredevil Mustafa which went to feature in the Karnataka State Budget for the year 2024. Dhananjaya often writes columns in Kannada newspapers choosing topics such as social issues and human values.

== Filmography ==
Key
| † | Denotes films that have not yet been released |

| Year | Title | Role | Language | Notes | Ref. |
|---|---|---|---|---|---|
| 2013 | Director's Special | Dhananjaya | Kannada | Debut film | |
| 2014 | Jayanagar 4th Block | Himself | Kannada | Story writer | |
| 2015 | Rhaatee | Raja | Kannada | | |
| 2015 | Boxer | Raja | Kannada | | |
| 2016 | Jessie | Jessie | Kannada | | |
| 2016 | Badmaash | Vijay | Kannada | | |
| 2017 | Allama | Allama Prabhu | Kannada | | |
| 2017 | Eradane Sala | Dhanu | Kannada | | |
| 2017 | Happy New Year | RJ Danny | Kannada | | |
| 2018 | Tagaru | Daali | Kannada | | |
| 2018 | Bhairava Geetha | Bhairava | Kannada; Telugu | | |
| 2018 | Life Jothe Ondh Selfie | Karthik | Kannada | Special appearance | |
| 2019 | Yajamana | Mittai Soori | Kannada | | |
| 2020 | Popcorn Monkey Tiger | Tiger Seena | Kannada | | |
| 2021 | Pogaru | Dhananjay | Kannada | | |
| 2021 | Yuvarathnaa | Antony Joseph | Kannada | | |
| 2021 | Salaga | Samrat | Kannada | | |
| 2021 | Rathnan Prapancha | Rathnakara | Kannada | | |
| 2021 | Pushpa: The Rise | Jaali Reddy | Telugu | | |
| 2022 | Badava Rascal | Shankar | Kannada | Also producer | |
| 2022 | Twenty One Hours | Srikanth | Kannada | | |
| 2022 | Bairagee | Karna | Kannada | | |
| 2022 | Monsoon Raaga | Katte | Kannada | | |
| 2022 | Totapuri: Chapter 1 | Narayana Pillai | Kannada | | |
| 2022 | Head Bush | M. P. Jayaraj | Kannada | Also producer | |
| 2022 | Once Upon a Time in Jamaligudda | Krishan (Heroshima) | Kannada | | |
| 2023 | Orchestra Mysuru | Shepard | Kannada | Cameo appearance | |
| 2023 | Gurudev Hoysala | Gurudev Hoysala | Kannada | | |
| 2023 | Paayum Oli Nee Yenakku | Jeevan | Tamil | | |
| 2023 | Manu Charitra | Rudra | Telugu | | |
| 2023 | Thothapuri: Chapter 2 | Narayana Pillai | Kannada | | |
| 2024 | Kotee | Kotee | Kannada | | |
| 2024 | Mazhai Pidikkatha Manithan | Daali | Tamil | | |
| 2024 | Tagaru Palya | ——— | Kannada | Producer only | |
| 2024 | Zebra | Aditya Devaraj | Telugu | | |
| 2024 | Pushpa 2: The Rule | Jaali Reddy | Telugu | | |
| 2025 | Vidyapati | Anaconda | Kannada | Also producer; cameo appearance | |
| 2026 | Parasakthi | Sharifa | Tamil | Cameo appearance | |
| 2026 | Mother Promise | Rossi | Kannada | | |
| 2026 | 666 Operation Dream Theatre † | Shankar | Kannada | Completed | |
| 2026 | Halagali † | TBA | Kannada | Filming | |
| 2026 | Anna From Mexico † | TBA | Kannada | Completed | |
| TBA | Uttarakaanda † | Gabru Sathya | Kannada | Delayed | |

=== As lyricist ===
| Year | Song | Film | Composer | Ref. |
|---|---|---|---|---|
| 2021 | "Udupi Hotelu" | Badava Rascal | Vasuki Vaibhav | |
| 2022 | "Habibi Habibi" | Head Bush | Charan Raj | |
| 2023 | "Maadappa" | Orchestra Mysuru | Raghu Dixit | |
| 2023 | "Sulla Chandira" | Orchestra Mysuru | Raghu Dixit | |
| 2023 | "Nadiyondu" | Orchestra Mysuru | Raghu Dixit | |
| 2023 | "Dum Idre Hodi Nanna" | Orchestra Mysuru | Raghu Dixit | |
| 2023 | "Sangeeta Sagara" | Orchestra Mysuru | Raghu Dixit | |
| 2023 | "Arey Arey" | Orchestra Mysuru | Raghu Dixit | |
| 2023 | "Idu Yeno Ondthara" | Orchestra Mysuru | Raghu Dixit | |
| 2023 | "Haaduve Naa Haaduve" | Orchestra Mysuru | Raghu Dixit | |
| 2023 | "Tagaru Palya Title Track" | Tagaru Palya | Vasuki Vaibhav | |
| 2023 | "Suryakanthi" | Tagaru Palya | Vasuki Vaibhav | |
| 2023 | "Nondkobyaadve" | Tagaru Palya | Vasuki Vaibhav | |
| 2024 | "Odu Odu" | Abbabba | Deepak Alexander | |

== Awards and nominations ==
List of film awards and nominations
| Work | Award | Category | Result | Ref. |
|---|---|---|---|---|
| Director's Special | 3rd SIIMA Awards | Best Male Debutant | Won | |
| Allama | 65th Filmfare Awards South | Critics Best Actor – Kannada | Won | |
| Allama | Basavaratna Awards | Best Actor | Won | |
| Tagaru | Zee Kannada Hemmeya Kannadiga Award | Best Supporting Actor | Won | |
| Tagaru | 66th Filmfare Awards South | Best Supporting Actor – Kannada | Won | |
| Tagaru | 8th SIIMA Awards | Best Actor in a Negative Role | Won | |
| Popcorn Monkey Tiger | 9th SIIMA Awards | Best Actor – Kannada | Won | |
| Salaga | 10th SIIMA Awards | Best Supporting Actor – Kannada | Nominated | |
| Salaga | 67th Filmfare Awards South | Best Supporting Actor – Kannada | Nominated | |
| Badava Rascal | 67th Filmfare Awards South | Best Actor – Kannada | Won | |
| Badava Rascal | 10th SIIMA Awards | Best Actor – Kannada | Nominated | |
| Yuvarathnaa | 10th SIIMA Awards | Best Actor in a Negative Role – Kannada | Nominated | |
| Yuvarathnaa | 10th SIIMA Awards | Best sensation of Kannada cinema | Won | |
| Tagaru Palya | 69th Filmfare Awards South | Best Lyricist – Kannada | Nominated | |
