= Once Upon a Time in Jamaligudda =

Indian Kannada film

- Directed by: Kushal Gowda
- Written by: Kushal Gowda
- Produced by: Sri Hari
- Starring: Dhananjaya; Aditi Prabhudeva
- Cinematography: Karthik S
- Edited by: Harish Komme
- Music by: Arjun Janya
- Production company: Pinaka Studios
- Distributed by: Jagadeesh Films
- Release date: 30 December 2022
- Country: India
- Language: Kannada

Once Upon a Time in Jamaligudda is a 2022 Indian Kannada-language romantic drama film written and directed by Kushal Gowda, and produced by Sri Hari under Niharika Movies banners. The film stars Dhananjaya and Aditi Prabhudeva in pivotal roles. The music is composed by Arjun Janya. It was released on 30 December 2022 and received positive reviews from critics.

== Plot ==
Chukki (Praanya P Rao) narrates the story of her childhood, set in the 90s, which includes time spent with her uncle, Hiroshima aka Krishna (Dhananjaya). Hiroshima is in love with Rukku (Aditi Prabhudeva) who works in a massage parlour. Their love story leads to chaos, and a murder changes the course of their lives. How they manage to come out of this mess forms the rest of the story.

== Cast ==
- Dhananjaya as Heroshima aka Krishna
- Aditi Prabhudeva as Rukmini aka Rukku
- Yash Shetty as Nagasaki
- Praanya P Rao as Chukki
- Triveni Rao as SI Roopa
- Prakash Belawadi as Police Officer
- Bhavana

== Release ==
The film was released on 30 December 2022 in theatres.
