= Twenty One Hours =

- Directed by: Jaishankar Pandit
- Produced by: Abhishek Tumkur Rudramurthy; Praveen Mahadeva
- Starring: Dhananjay; Durga Krishna; Sudev Nair; Rahul Madhav
- Cinematography: Tirru
- Edited by: A. Richard Kevin
- Music by: Rupert Fernandez
- Production company: Aham Conceptam Private limited
- Release date: 20 May 2022
- Running time: 115 min
- Country: India
- Languages: Kannada; Malayalam

Twenty One Hours is a 2022 Indian Kannada-Malayalam bilingual thriller film directed by Jaishankar Pandit in his directorial debut. The film stars Dhananjay, Durga Krishna, Sudev Nair, and Rahul Madhav in the lead roles. The film also features the Malayali accent of Kannada.

== Cast ==
- Dhananjay as Srikanth
- Durga Krishna as Madhuri Menon
- Sudev Nair as Renjith Menon
- Rahul Madhav
- Poornachandra Mysore
- Apoorva Bharadwaj
- Dinesh Babu
- Shweta Sanjeevulu

== Soundtrack ==
No.	Title	Length
1.	"Devare devare"	2:05
2.	"Twenty one hours title track"	1:23
3.	"Twenty one hours theme song"	2:04

== Release ==
The film was released on 20 May 2022.

== Reception ==
Sunayana Suresh critic of Times of india gave 3 starts out of 5 and stated that "Dhananjaya has good scope to show his acting prowess in a role that grows from edgy to absurd, and he excels". A Sharadhaa critic of Cinema Express stated that "the big question is whether the hardcore fans of Dhananjay will accept him in this new avatar." and gave 3 stars out of 5. A critic from OTT Play gave 3 stars out of 5 and stated that "For a film that's rigged with technical deficiencies, Twenty-One Hours is nevertheless an honest and exciting shot at an overblown genre. Very few films in the current generation question the audience's moral and ethical tendencies, and although director Jaishankar Pandit errs in terms of tonality and plotting, he still manages to put together a worthwhile watch that offers many pleasant surprises. The film's for you if you like a bit of genre subversion and a few twists along the road."
