= Made in China (2022 film) =

- Directed by: Preetham Tegginamane
- Written by: Nischal V. Preetham Tegginamane
- Produced by: Nandakishore C.
- Starring: Nagabhushana; Priyanka Thimmesh
- Cinematography: Preetham Tegginamane
- Edited by: Preetham Tegginamane
- Music by: Vivan Radhakrishna
- Production company: NK Studios
- Release date: 17 June 2022
- Country: India
- Language: Kannada

Made in China is a 2022 Indian Kannada-language screenlife family drama film directed by Preetham Tegginamane and starring Nagabhushana and Priyanka Thimmesh.

== Plot ==
Abhiram, who is stuck in China due to work, tries to solve a tricky situation with his wife Mythili who is at home.

== Cast ==
- Nagabhushana as Abhiram
- Priyanka Thimmesh as Mythili
- Ravi Bhat
- Aruna Balraj
- Ashwin Rao Pallaki
- Gowrav Shetty

== Soundtrack ==
The music was composed by Vivan Radhakrishna.

Track listing
No.	Title	Lyrics	Singer(s)	Length
1.	"Dhoora Dhoora"	Preetham Tegginamane	Siddhartha Belmannu, Shakthisree Gopalan	5:47
Total length:				5:47

== Reception ==
A critic from The Times of India wrote that "One must hand it to director Preetham Tegginamane for delivering a film that looks competent and manages to entertain". A critic from Cinema Express wrote that "Honestly, Made in China is not meant for the big screen, and the makers should have instead opted for an OTT release. Even if it meant exclusive for the mobile screen!" A critic from Deccan Herald wrote that "Despite constraints, the film partially manages to entertain. This is a bold attempt by the director, but the film fails to offer a cinematic experience". A critic from OTTplay wrote that "The film is under two hours in run-time, but still too long for such a wafer-thin premise. Wait for Made in China to drop on OTT when it does".
