= Totapuri: Chapter 1 =

Kannada language film directed by Vijay Prasad

- Directed by: Vijaya Prasad
- Written by: Vijaya Prasad
- Produced by: K. A. Suresh
- Starring: Jaggesh; Dhananjay; Aditi Prabhudeva; Suman Ranganathan; H. G. Dattatreya; Veena Sundar; Hema Datta
- Cinematography: Niranjan Prabhu
- Music by: J. Anoop Seelin
- Production company: Monyplex Studios
- Release date: 30 September 2022
- Running time: 111 minutes
- Country: India
- Language: Kannada

Totapuri: Chapter 1 (transl. Parrot face: Chapter 1) is a 2022 Indian Kannada-language romantic comedy film written and directed by Vijaya Prasad and produced by K A Suresh. The film stars Jaggesh, Dhananjay, Suman Ranganathan, and Aditi Prabhudeva.

== Premise ==
Eeregowda is a farmer and tailor who is a specialist in Totapuri design clothes. He meets Shakeela Banu, a cashier, and the duo fall for each other. After much thought, the two reluctantly decide to inform the elders about their relationship despite being scared of issues based on their religion, caste, and faith.

== Cast ==
- Jaggesh as Eeregowda, a farmer and tailor
- Dhananjay as Narayana Pillai
- Suman Ranganathan as Victoria
- Aditi Prabhudeva as Shakeela Banu
- H. G. Dattatreya as Imaam Saheb
- Veena Sundar as Rangamma
- Hema Dutta as Nanjamma
- Shille Manjunath as Mechanic

== Release ==
Totapuri: Chapter 1 was released on 30 September 2022.

== Reception ==
Thotapuri: Chapter 1 received mixed reviews from critics.

Vinay Lokesh of The Times of India gave 3.5 out of 5 stars and wrote "Jaggesh’s films come with a ton of double entenders; Vijayaprasad, too, is known for his double-meaning comedy layered with philosophical undertones. And when they come together, one can only expect oodles of fun and Thothapuri Chapter 1 has a plenty of it." A Sharaadha of Cinema Express gave 3 out of 5 stars and wrote "Vijayaprasad has his own set of fans who like his way of writing or telling a story. But it is also time for the director to get out of his comfort zone, and bring in newness, without giving up on his signature style."

Swaroop Kodur of OTTplay gave 2 out of 5 stars and wrote "Thothapuri Chapter 1 is an endearing film at first glance but the persisting play on words, especially as double-entendres, is a major letdown as far as the overall experience is concerned. Sure, some of the jokes do land well and there's also an emotional core in the midst but Vijayaprasad's tried-and-tested filmmaking approach has perhaps gone stale now."

== Sequel ==
Totapuri: Chapter 2, the film's sequel was also directed by Prasad and released in 2023 with Jaggesh reprising his role from the first chapter.
