= Hosa Dinachari =

2023 film directed by Vyshak Pushpalatha, Keerthi Shekar

- Directed by: Vyshak Pushpalatha; Keerthi Shekhar
- Written by: Vyshak Pushpalatha; Keerthi Shekhar
- Produced by: Mrityunjay Shukla; Alok Chaurasiya; Gangadhar Salimath
- Starring: Babu Hirannaiah; Aruna Balaraj; Deepak Subramanya; Sripriya; Chethan; Supreeth Gowda; Mandara Battalahalli; Varsha Susana Kurien
- Cinematography: Rawkey
- Edited by: Ranjith Sethu
- Music by: Vyshak Varma
- Release date: 23 December 2022
- Country: India
- Language: Kannada

Hosa Dinachari (transl. A New Routine) is a 2022 Indian Kannada-language drama genre film directed by Vyshak Pushpalatha and Keerthi Shekhar, starring Babu Hirannaiah, Aruna Balaraj, Mandara Battalahalli, Chethan.This movie which was initially set to release on 9 December, was pushed to release on 23 December later by the movie team

== Plot ==
Hosa Dinachari is an absolute 'Feel Good' story, that revolves around three different families work on their dynamics to heal each other, while spending their most vulnerable times with complete strangers Rajesh (Chethan Vicky), a 29-year-old cab driver, desperately looking for a bride through all possible sources (Matrimony websites, dating apps, brokers, etc.) is forced to be in quarantine after he comes into contact with a covid positive patient. His stay becomes exciting when an exquisite NRI, Kiran (Varsha Kurien) shares room with him, thanks to the blatant mistake of the authorities who assign the quarantine rooms. Kiran, is granddaughter of Veeranna (Babu Hirannaiah) and Gowri (Aruna Balraj), who are still deeply in love despite their 50 years of married life. They suffer a huge blow when Veeranna is hit by covid, and is hospitalized considering his age factor. He is treated by Dr. Bharath (Deepak Subramanya), who hasn’t been home since the beginning of covid. Bharath’s wife, Nidhi (Sripriya) and daughter, Aarna (Baby Manini) don’t want him to be working amidst high risk for the usual reasons. Lone Gowri takes help from her next-door live-in couple, Apeksha (Mandara Battalahalli) and Sharan (Supreeth Gowda). Sharan, who’s madly in love with Apeksha, hasn’t been able to impress her lately, since his over-affection and more and more of his love, has turned into a burden and boredom for her. He decides to utilize the opportunity of spending the 21-day lockdown with her, to win her back.

Rajesh has the usual infatuation for Kiran and tries his best to impress her, which backfires him every time. He starts realizing the financial and social gap between them when Kiran opens up about her life style abroad and about her plans of flying back to Singapore after a few days. He drops his plan of impressing her, starts to be himself and consoles her when she talks about her fears (Of her grandparents not welcoming her back since Kiran and her parents weren’t in touch with them for 20 years) which helps to build a positive impact of Rajesh’s character in Kiran’s mind. Veeranna is reminded of his son by Chirag (Vivek Dev), a 24 YO patient in the same ward, with the way that Chirag avoids his parents. Veeranna and Gowri start missing each other, since this is the first time they both are separated for these many days. Gowri, sees Kiran in Apeksha and in her love shown to Gowri and helps Apeksha to sort the differences that she and Sharan are suffering. Aarna is stubborn and wants Bharath to come home for her birthday, despite him trying to convince that he can’t. Bharath decides to go home for a day, after making sure he isn’t infected by the virus.

Things take turn with Chirag’s untimely death, because of which Veeranna becomes restless. He’s convinced that he can't win over the virus and tries convincing Bharath that he has to go back home and spend the rest of his days with his wife, Gowri. Bharath lets him go back to his wife, after taking a few promises from him (that he won’t go near his wife and he won’t step outside of his house till he gets better). Bharath is not able to do the same even though his test result is negative, since he’s asked to replace an ICU doctor, who’s tested positive recently. Veeranna reaches his house and starts spending time with his wife happily, but his health keeps deteriorating as he starts experiencing severe symptoms of covid. Meanwhile Kiran asks a weird favor to Rajesh to sneak her out of the quarantine cell, since she’s not able to wait longer to meet her grandparents. Rajesh drops her to her grandparents' house and bids goodbye to Kiran. By the time she reaches her grandparents' house, Veeranna would have lost his life and it is revealed that Kiran’s story was running ahead of the other two timelines and not parallel. The film ends with an emotional block revealing the sufferings of all the characters parallelly. Nidhi, finally understands Bharath and starts supporting him, which boosts up Bharath to save more and more patients. Nidhi and Aarna wait for Bharath to return safe and sound, while he works in hospital extensively. Apeksha and Sharan, try to sort out differences between them, giving each other second chances. Rajesh continues his bridal search through his old sources and is back to square one. Kiran feels her grandfather’s presence in front of his grave for the last time, and prepares herself to face her grandmother who’s sitting at a distance. Kiran and Gowri lock looks.

== Cast ==
- Babu Hirannaiah as Veeranna
- Aruna Balraj as Gowri
- Deepak Subramanya as Bharath
- Sripriya as Nidhi
- Chethan Vicky as Rajesh
- Mandara Battalahalli as Apeksha
- Supreeth Gowda as Sharan
- Varsha Susana Kurien as Kiran

== Soundtrack ==
Hosa Dinachari has four melodious tracks, 'Ninade Nenapu', 'Neene', 'Oh Manave' and 'Neeli Mugila', all composed by Vyshak Verma and released under the music label, Anand Audio. The soundtrack has voices lent by Vasuki Vaibhav, Varun Ramachandra, Rakshana Sridhar, Anjana Balakrishnan and the composer Vyshak Verma himself.

== Reception ==
Reviewing Hosa Dinachari, Harish Basavarajaiah of The Times of India has given a rating of 3.5 out of 5 and calls it "A slice-of-life film" set during the COVID-19 times. Y Maheshwar Reddy from Bangalore Mirror rates this movie a 4 on 5, by calling it a 'Tribute to Corona Warriors'
