= Neer Dose =

- Theatrical release poster
- Directed by: Vijaya Prasad
- Screenplay by: Vijaya Prasad
- Story by: Vijaya Prasad
- Produced by: S. Prasanna; S. Shashikala Balaji
- Starring: Jaggesh; Hariprriya; Suman Ranganathan; H. G. Dattatreya
- Cinematography: Sugnaan
- Edited by: Suresh Urs
- Music by: Anoop Seelin
- Production company: Skkandda Entertainment
- Distributed by: C K Cine Creations
- Release date: September 2, 2016
- Running time: 135 minutes
- Country: India
- Language: Kannada

Neer Dose is a 2016 Indian Kannada-language black comedy film produced by T. Goswami and Shashikala Balaji, written and directed by Vijaya Prasad. It stars Jaggesh and Hariprriya alongside Suman Ranganathan and H. G. Dattatreya. It was one of the most highly acclaimed films of 2016.

== Premise ==
The plot revolves around the lives of four characters — Jaggesh Kumar, a crematorium van driver; Dattatreya, a retired man and Jaggesh Kumar's close friend; Kumudha, a sex worker; and Sharada Mani, a milk stall owner. It also tells the story of how they met, their individual backstories and the role Neer Dose played in their life.

== Cast ==
- Jaggesh as Jaggesh Kumar
- Hariprriya as Kumudha
- Suman Ranganathan as Sharadha Mani
- H. G. Dattatreya as Dattatreya

== Soundtrack ==
All music is composed by Anoop Seelin.

No.	Title	Lyrics	Singer(s)	Length
1.	"Sapura Kati"	Arasu Anthare	Ananya Bhagath	3:46
2.	"Hogi Baa Belake"	Vijaya Prasad	Gangubai Hangal, Anoop Seelin	3:54
3.	"Nanna Pedde Preethisu"	Vijaya Prasad	Siddharth Belmannu, Samanvitha Sharma	3:49
4.	"Neer Dose"	Vijaya Prasad	L. N. Shastry, Sunitha Murali	4:01
Total length:				15:30

== Production ==
Backed by the technical team of Vijaya Prasad's Sidlingu, the film began production in October 2012. Production was delayed by the unavailability of actress Ramya following her election as a Member of Parliament from Mandya. One of the film's producers, Ashu, approached Jaggesh to sort out the issue and complete the movie. In response, Jaggesh composed a series of tweets directed at Ramya in which he criticized her lack of availability for filming. Production resumed in June 2015 after Ramya arrived and other production issues were resolved.

== Release ==
Neer Dose was released on September 2, 2016 in 120 theatres, coinciding with Ganesh Chaturdashi. The trailer and music received over 1,900,000 views on social media.

Neer Dose received an A certification from the Central Board of Film Certification, citing its many double entendre one-liners.

=== Home media ===
The satellite and digital rights of the film were sold to Colors Kannada and Voot. The film made its digital streaming in Voot on 31 March 2022.

== Reception ==
=== Critical response ===
Neer Dose received mixed reviews from critics.

Sunayana Suresh of The Times of India gave 3 out of 5 stars and wrote "This film is meant for those who like their conversations with a fair share of innuendo and the typical regressive fare when it comes to portraying women. The film has many food references, starting from the title itself, but be warned that these are masked with many sexual references, so you need a stomach that's strong enough to digest those."

Shashiprasad SM of Deccan Chronicle gave 3 out of 5 stars and wrote "Jaggesh and Dattanna, the two fine actors are yet again at their best performances and a treat while they make it look very natural. Hariprriya as Kumuda is the real change over for the actress, who has pulled it with ace marks. Irrespective of how 'Neer Dose' turns out to be at the end of the day before the box office, Hariprriya's effortless acting will be an everlasting remark in her career. No wonder, even if she manages to win an award or two for this daring one."
