= Petromax (2022 film) =

2022 Indian comedy-drama film

- First look poster
- Directed by: Vijaya Prasad
- Written by: Vijaya Prasad
- Produced by: Sudhir KM; Rajashekar KG
- Starring: Sathish Ninasam; Hariprriya; Karunya Ram
- Cinematography: Niranjan Babu
- Edited by: Suresh Aras
- Music by: Anoop Seelin
- Production companies: Satish Picture House; Studio 18; Petromax Pictures
- Distributed by: KRG Studios
- Release date: 15 July 2022
- Running time: 134 minutes
- Country: India
- Language: Kannada

Petromax is a 2022 Indian Kannada-language comedy drama film written and directed by Vijaya Prasad. The film is produced by Sathish Ninasam and Vijaya Prasad under the banner Sathish Picture House. It stars Sathish Ninasam and Hariprriya alongside Karunya Ram. The story of the film revolves around the lives of four orphans and how they find love in an older woman.

== Synopsis ==
Petromax is a brand name for a type of pressurised paraffin lamp that uses a mantle. Petromax symbolises light, which is essential in the lives of four orphans around whom the plot revolves.

== Cast ==
- Sathish Ninasam as "Oodubatti" Shivappa
- Hariprriya as Meenakshi
- Arun as "Agarbatti" Maadappa
- Nagabhushana as Krishnamurthy
- Karunya Ram as Kavitha Krishnamurthy
- Vijayalakshmi Singh as Sudha Murthy
- Sudha Belawadi as L Shanthakumari
- Achyuth Kumar as Meenakshi's Father
- Padmaja Rao as Meenakshi's Mother
- K S Sridhar as Anathashrama Head
- Ashwin Hassan as Surendranath
- Suman Ranganath as Subbalakshmi, Cameo appearance
- Veena Sundar as Petromax, Cameo appearance
- Mohan Juneja as Rangayana Ragu, Real Estate Agent

== Production ==
Hariprriya was cast for the film in October 2020 alongside Sathish Ninasam. It is Hariprriya's second film with director Vijaya Prasad, after Neer Dose. Principal photography began in October 2020 in Mysore. The filming was 50 percent completed by the end of October 2020. Filming was completed in the first week of January 2021. With the release of trailer on 20 September 2021, the post-production work on the film was completed. The film was submitted to the Central Board of Film Certification (CBFC) where the film received A certificate.

== Reception ==
Sunayana Suresh reviewing for The Times of India rated the film 3.5 out of 5 and praised the performances of Sathish Ninasam, Hariprriya, Karunya Ram, Arun and Nagabhushana along with other supporting cast. Praising dialogues and performances, Suresh wrote, "the film wins with its dialogues, characterisations and performances - all of them go hand in glove". She added, "editing deserves a special mention for mixing direct narration and scenes seamlessly, as also the background score, which is quirky and adds to the humour." Concluding, Suresh said, "the filmmaker definitely needs to be lauded for pushing the envelope in his space by choosing to speak about some relevant topics in his trademark style." A Sharadhaa reviewing for The New Indian Express rated the film 3 out of 5 and wrote, "Petromax, highlighting light and life, is an honest and bold attempt by the director that ends with a hint of a sequel."
