= Nodi Swamy Ivanu Irode Heege =

2022 Kannada-language film

- Official poster
- Directed by: Islahuddin NS
- Written by: Islahuddin NS
- Produced by: Amrej Suryavanshi
- Starring: Rishi; Dhanya Balakrishna; Aproova Bharadwaj
- Cinematography: Vishnu Prasad P Dulip Kumar M S
- Edited by: Guruswamy T
- Music by: Prasanna Sivaraman
- Production company: STARFAB production
- Release date: 22 July 2022
- Country: India
- Language: Kannada

Nodi Swamy Ivanu Irode Heege is a 2022 Indian Kannada-language comedy drama film directed by Islahuddin NS and starring Rishi, Dhanya Balakrishna and Apoorva Bharadwaj. The film released on Zee5. The film is about a man with depression and is suicidal.

== Cast ==
- Rishi as Sai Kumar
- Dhanya Balakrishna as Gajalakshmi
- Nagabhushana
- Apoorva Bharadwaj as Vinutha
- Greeshma Sridhar

== Production ==
After Sarvajanikarige Suvarnavakasha (2019), Rishi and Dhanya star together in this film.

== Reception ==
A critic from The Times of India wrote that "To chose[sic] a subject that deals with depression and suicide as the central theme and converting that into a comedy is tough. One must applaud the writing for making this believable". A critic from The New Indian Express opined that "Unfortunately, NSIIH, a film that highlights the issue of depression with limited doses of humour, is neither relatable nor is it funny". A critic from Deccan Herald said that "While there is a sincere attempt to address the immediate issue of depression, especially with the increased numbers during and post pandemic lockdown, the movie does take a set back in terms of relaxed storytelling and a hurried closure".
