= Nagabhushana =

Indian film actor

- Born: Nagabhushana N S
- Education: SJCE Mysore
- Occupation: Actor
- Years active: 2018–present

Nagabhushana N S, also known as Nagabhushana, is an Indian film actor, who has worked predominantly in Kannada movie industry. Nagabhushana made his debut with the Kannada film Sankashta Kara Ganapathi.

== Career ==
Nagabhushan joined GPIER, an amateur theatre group founded by Rangayana artist Mime Ramesh.He worked in a government job before he left the job to pursue a career in acting. Along with his friends from college, he started a YouTube channel, Karnataka Entertainment Board, in 2016 to convey socially relevant issue through humour. He has acted, directed and wrote scripts of many of the episodes published in the channel. One of the episode named "Lucia Pawan has HFPS Disease", in which Pawan Kumar acted as a patient with social media addiction, has received more than 350,000 views on Youtube. After making his film debut with Badmaash (2016), he acted in Sankashta Kara Ganapathi (2018) as Likith Shetty's friend. A critic from The Times of India noted that "Nagabhushan as Likith's best buddy is a hoot and is another show stealer". He wrote the story for a web series titled Honeymoon and also acted in it opposite Sanjana Aanand. The episodes of the Honeymoon web series were first released in Telugu on Aha streaming service and later in Kannada on Voot. He has also acted in a lead role in Ikkat, a comedy entertainer which depicts the struggles of a married couple during the Covid-19 related forced lockdown. The Ikkat movie premiered on July 21, 2021, on Amazon Prime Video and got mostly positive reviews by film critics. A BookMyShow review on the Ikkat film mentioned that "Nagabhushan pulls off a brilliant comical act with a great mix of expressions and dialogue delivery".

== Controversy ==
On October 1, 2023, Nagabhushana was arrested for fatally running over woman in Bengaluru.

== Filmography ==
- All films are in Kannada, unless otherwise noted.

Key
†	Denotes films that have not yet been released

Year	Film	Role	Notes
2018	Sankashta Kara Ganapathi	Ganapathi's friend	
2018	Johnny Johnny Yes Papa	Rahul	
2018	U Turn	Auto driver	Telugu-Tamil film
2018	Ondalla Eradalla	Suresha	
2020	French Biriyani	Purushottam	
2021	Ikkat	Vasu	
2021	Salaga	Vijay's lawyer	
2021	Yuvarathnaa	Doctor	
2021	Badava Rascal	Nagalinga	
2022	Honeymoon	Praveen	Web Series
2022	Hope	Somu	
2022	Petromax	Krishnamurthy	
2022	Lucky Man	Shetty	
2022	Made in China	Abhiram	
2022	Nodi Swamy Ivanu Irode Heege	Hacker	
2023	Daredevil Musthafa	Sarpabhushana	
2023	Kousalya Supraja Rama	Santhu	
2023	Tagaru Palya	Chikka	
2024	Matinee	Nixon Flash	
2025	Vidyapati	Siddu aka Vidyapati	
2026	Mother Promise	CCTV technician	

== Accolades ==
Film	Awards	Category	Result	Ref
Ikkat	10th South Indian International Movie Awards	Best Debutant Actor- Kannada	Won	
Badava Rascal	10th South Indian International Movie Awards	Best Supporting Actor	Nominated	
Badava Rascal	67th Filmfare Awards South	Best Supporting Actor	Nominated	
Tagaru Palya	69th Filmfare Awards South	Best Actor	Nominated	
Kousalya Supraja Rama	69th Filmfare Awards South	Best Supporting Actor	Nominated	
Kousalya Supraja Rama	12th South Indian International Movie Awards	Best Actor In a Comedy Role	Nominated	
