= Dhairyam (2017 film) =

- Theatrical poster
- Directed by: Shiva Tejas
- Written by: Shiva Tejas
- Produced by: Dr. K Raju
- Starring: Ajay Rao; P. Ravishankar; Sadhu Kokila; Aditi Prabhudeva; Jai Jagadish; Honnavalli Krishna
- Cinematography: Shekar Chandru
- Edited by: K.M. Prakash
- Music by: Emil Mohammed
- Production company: Raj Production
- Distributed by: Raj Production
- Release date: 21 July 2017
- Running time: 145 minutes
- Country: India
- Language: Kannada

Dhairyam (transl. Courage) is a 2017 Indian Kannada film directed by Shiva Tejas who earlier directed Male (2015), and produced by Dr. K Raju under the banner Raj Production. The film stars Ajay Rao, Aditi Prabhudeva, P. Ravishankar, Sadhu Kokila, Jai Jagadish, and Honnavalli Krishna. The music was composed by Emil, and art direction was done by K. Shiva Kumar. Stunt sequences were choreographed by Ravi Varma.

The principal photography commenced on 18 September 2016 in Bangalore. The film was later dubbed in Hindi as Dhairyam in 2018 on Rkd studio.

== Plot ==
Ajay (Ajay Rao), a state level rank student who comes from a lower-middle-class background is always in financial trouble. He falls in love with Parimala, whose parents are very practical about relationships and impose many terms and conditions in order for her to marry him. Ajay is already in too much of a burden as he has to arrange money for his father's cancer operation. The story is about how he manages these hurdles.

== Cast ==
- Ajay Rao as Ajay
- Aditi Prabhudeva as Parimala
- P. Ravishankar as DCP Kashyap
- Jai Jagadish as Minister Dhasharatha
- Sadhu Kokila as Politician
- Honnavalli Krishna as Ajay's father
- Srinivas Prabhu as Parimala's father
- Sangeetha as Parimala's mother
- Padhmini as Ajay's mother

== Soundtrack ==
Dhairyam

Soundtrack album by Emil Mohammed
- Released: 2017
- Genre: Feature film soundtrack
- Language: Kannada
- Label: Ananda Audio
- Producer: Emil

The film's score and soundtrack were composed by Emil Mohammed.

Tracklist
No.	Title	Singer(s)	Length
1.	"Selfie Hodkondu"	Tippu, Indu Nagaraj
2.	"Namduke Hingide"	Emil, Keerthana Iyer
3.	"Enappa Maadli Naanu"	Vijay Prakash, Anirudh
4.	"Dhairyam Sarvatra Sadhanam"	Karthika Shaji, Al Rufian

== Reception ==
A critic from Bangalore Mirror wrote that "Better writing could have done wonders for this film which is still worth a watch". A critic from The Times of India wrote that "Dhairyam can be a good watch for those who seek masala, as the tale has some clever twists".
