= Triple Riding =

2022 romantic comedy film

- Release poster
- Directed by: Mahesh Gowda
- Written by: Mahesh Gowda
- Produced by: Ramgopal Y. M.
- Starring: Ganesh: Aditi Prabhudeva; Megha Shetty; Rachana Inder
- Cinematography: Jai Anand
- Edited by: K. M. Prakash
- Music by: Sai Karthik
- Production company: Krupalu Entertainments
- Release date: 25 November 2022
- Country: India
- Language: Kannada

Triple Riding (also known as Tribble Riding) is a 2022 Indian Kannada-language romantic comedy film directed by Mahesh Gowda and produced by Ramgopal Y. M. under Krupalu Entertainments. The film stars Ganesh, Aditi Prabhudeva, Megha Shetty and Rachana Inder, alongside P. Ravi Shankar, Sharath Lohithaswa, Shobaraj, Sadhu Kokila and Rangayana Raghu. The music was composed by Sai Karthik, while cinematography and editing were handled by Jai Anand and K. M. Prakash.

Triple Riding was released on 25 November 2022 and received mixed reviews from critics.

== Plot ==
Ram, a vagabond working in various job fields, lives a happy life with his father, a lawyer. One day, Ram meets Ramya, the daughter of a rich business tycoon Devendra Shetty, and they gradually fall for each other. Ramya asks Ram to help Dr. Rakshitha elope from her father MLA Soorappa, who has fixed a wedding alliance with Home Minister's son Rahul. Ram reluctantly agrees, where he masquerades as Dr. Mahesh and joins a hospital where Rakshitha works. Having helped Rakshitha escape from her family, Ram learns that Ramya never loved him and used him to help her reunite with Rahul, as they loved each other. Rakshitha also elopes with her boyfriend, Dr. Prem, a surgeon. Thrown in a fix, Ram escapes to Chikmaglur to stay with his father's friend Suryanarayana, where he meets Radhika, Suryanarayana's daughter. Radhika befriends Ram and learns about his problems. When Radhika proposes to Ram, he rejects her, but later accepts after seeing her willingness to sacrifice herself for him. A series of comedic sequences ensues in which Ram clears Soorappa and Shetty's misunderstandings and happily marries Radhika.

== Cast ==
- Ganesh as Ram/Dr. Mahesh
- Aditi Prabhudeva as Ramya Shetty
- Megha Shetty as Dr. Rakshitha
- Rachana Inder as Radhika
- Sharath Lohithaswa as legislator Surappa
- Achyuth Kumar as Ram's father
- Sadhu Kokila as Garuda
- Archana Kottige as Rashmika
- Shobaraj as Shetty
- Rangayana Raghu as Suryanarayana: Ram's father's friend and realtor
- Ravishankar Gowda
- P. Ravishankar as Inspector Annaiah
- Kuri Prathap as a compounder
- Aravind Bolar as a priest
- Chitkala Biradar
- Dingri Nagaraj
- M. S. Umesh
- Aniruddha Jatkar as Dr. Prem: Dr. Rakshitha's husband
- Yashas Surya

== Production ==
The film began production in December 2019. Aditi Prabhudeva, Megha Shetty and Rachana Inder were announced as the three heroines. The first schedule was held at Mysuru in October 2020. The film was shot in Bangalore, Chikkamagalore and Sakaleshpur.

== Soundtrack ==
The songs are composed by Sai Karthik.

- "Yatta Yatta" - Chandan Shetty, Mangli
- "Sotheya Hrudaya" - Anuradha Bhat
- "Ee Hosa Sudina" - Anuradha Bhat
- "Twinkle Twinkle Little Star" - Vijay Prakash
- "Nijave Athava" - Sonu Nigam
- "Triple Riding Theme Music 1" - N/A
- "Triple Riding Theme Music 2" - Sai Karthik

== Reception ==
=== Critical response ===
Y. Maheswara Reddy of Bangalore Mirror gave 3.5/5 stars and wrote "Triple Riding would have been better had the director reduced the duration of the movie by at least 15 minutes." Harish Basavarajaiah of The Times of India gave 3/5 stars and wrote "For those who love comedy films, this would be a perfect weekend treat." A. Sharadhaa of The New Indian Express gave 2.5/5 stars and wrote "Tribble Riding is a tasteful comedy entertainer and an equally good romance. Interestingly this fun film has an underline message too." M. V. Vivek of Deccan Herald gave 1.5/5 stars and wrote "Triple Riding is a film that makes you go numb with its sheer lack of freshness." Prathibha Joy of OTTplay gave 1.5/5 stars and wrote "This is a ride that you may want to miss. Triple Riding is an offence, you see!" Muralidhara Khajane of The Hindu wrote "It is unfortunate that in the name of appeasing fans, filmmakers write scripts like these that offer stars nothing new to experiment with."
