= Vijaya Prasad =

Indian actor and director

- Born: India
- Occupations: Actor; Film director script writer
- Television: Silli Lalli; Maja with Sruja; Comedy Circle

Vijaya Prasad is an Indian actor, director, producer, and writer.

== Career ==
He started his career in Kannada TV serial Silli Lalli as comedy actor and writer. Later he entered into directional profession. Sidlingu is his first directional film.

== Filmography ==
| Year | Film | Notes |
|---|---|---|
| 2012 | Sidlingu | Filmfare Award for Best Director – Kannada |
| 2016 | Neer Dose | |
| 2022 | Petromax | |
| 2022 | Totapuri: Chapter 1 | |
| 2023 | Thothapuri: Chapter 2 | |
| 2025 | Sidlingu 2 | |

== Awards ==
- Filmfare Award for Best Director – Kannada - (2012) for Sidlingu
