= List of Kannada films of 2026 =

This is a list of Kannada language films produced in Karnataka in India that are scheduled to be released in the year 2026.

== Box office collection ==
The highest-grossing Kannada films released in 2026, by worldwide box office gross revenue, are as follows. The rank of the films in the following table depends on the estimate of worldwide collections as reported by organizations classified as green by Wikipedia. (Note: See WP:RSP, WP:ICTFSOURCES) There is no official tracking of domestic box office figures within India.

Background shading indicates that a film is currently showing in theatres worldwide.

Highest grossing Kannada films of 2026
Rank	Title	Production Company	Worldwide gross	Ref.
1	Toxic	KVN Productions; Monster Mind Creations LLP	₹350 crore	
2	Premada Oorali	Vanilla Entertainments	₹154 crore	
3	KD: The Devil	KVN Productions	₹24 crore	
4	Love Mocktail 3	KrissMi Films	₹20 crore	
5	Karavali	Gurudatha Ganiga Films	₹10.5 crore	
6	City Lights	Duniya Talkies	₹10 crore	
7	Landlord	Sarathi Films	₹8 crore	
8	Rakkasapuradhol	KN Entertainments	₹7.2 crore	
9	Bail	KVN Productions	₹6.5 crore	

== January–March ==
Opening		Title	Director	Cast	Studio	Ref.
J A N	1	Shivaleela	Ashok Jayram	Manjamma Jogathi; Dachchu Divakar	Jayram Creations	
J A N	1	Theertharoopa Thandeyavarige	Ramenahalli Jagannatha	Nihar Mukesh; Rachana Inder; Sithara; Rajesh Nataranga; Ravindra Vijay	Jai Chamundeshwari Productions	
J A N	1	The Ice	Subbu Bharadwaj	Venkat Reddy; Yogitha Kumbar; Rekha; Sushmitha	Vinayakaiah Entertainments	
J A N	2	Jaganmathe Akkamahadevi	Vishnukanth B. J.	Sulaksha Kaira; Suchendra Prasad; Tabla Nani; Vaijanath Biradar; Radhakrishna Pallaki	Bharat Cine Creations	
J A N	10	Maazar	Local Loki	Local Loki; Srihan; Deepak; Ugramm Ravi; Sambhramashree; Raju; Ranjan; Ajay Sharma	Sangeetha Cine House	
J A N	15	Surya: The Power of Love	Sagar Das	Prashanth Surya; Harshitha MK; Pramod Shetty; Shruti; P. Ravi Shankar; T. S. Nagabharana; Kaddipudi Chandru; Bhajarangi Prasanna; Bala Rajwadi	Nandi Cinemas	
J A N	16	Bharathi Teacher	M. L. Prasanna	Rohith Raghavendra; Yashika Chaira; Sihi Kahi Chandru; Govinde Gowda; Ashwin Hassan	Poojyaya Films	
J A N	23	Landlord	Jadesh K Hampi	Duniya Vijay; Rachita Ram; Raj B. Shetty; Achyuth Kumar; Rakesh Adiga	Sarathi Films	
J A N	23	Cult	Anil Kumar TM	Zaid Khan; Rachita Ram; Malaika Vasupal; Rangayana Raghu; Achyuth Kumar; Kishan Bilagali	KVN Productions; Loki Cinemas	
J A N	30	Amruthaanjan	Jothirao Mohit	Sudhakar Gowda; Payal Chengappa; Gowrav Shetty; Shree Bhavya; Karthik Ruvary	Lasya Vijay Entertainers	
J A N	30	Bose	Avinash Babu	Karthik M Talkal; Priya Haveri; Bharath Ganganna; M Anbu	Sri Subramanya Swamy Creations	
J A N	30	Chowkidar	Chandrashekar Bandiyappa	Pruthvi Ambaar; P. Sai Kumar; Dhanya Ramkumar	V S Entertainments	
J A N	30	Howddo Huliya	Aneesh Poojary Venur	Govinde Gowda; Vijanath Biradar; Mimicry Gopi; Priya Savadi; Umesh Kinnal	Swayamprabha Entertainment & Productions	
J A N	30	Mavuta	Ravishankar Nag	Lakshmipathi Balaji; Mahalakshmi Annapoorna; Thriller Manju; Padma Vasanthi; Divya Shree	SDR Productions	
J A N	30	Raktha Kashmira	Rajendra Singh Babu	Upendra; Ramya; Parvati Melton; Doddanna; Mukesh Rishi	MDM Productions	
J A N	30	Seat Edge	Chethan Shetty	Siddu Moolimani; Raviksha Shetty; Raghu Ramanakpppa; Girish Shivanna	N R Cinema Productions	
J A N	30	Sri Jagannatha Dasaru: Part 2	Madhusudhan Havaldar	Sharath Joshi; Nischitha Shetty; Srilatha Bagewadi; Vaishnavi Murthy	Mathambhuja Movies	
J A N	30	Valavaara	Sutan Gowda	Vedic Kaushal; Master Shayan; Malathesh; Harshitha R. Gowda	Morph Productions	
J A N	30	Vikalpa	Pruthviraj Patil	Pruthviraj Patil; Nagashree Hebbar; Harini Shreekanth; Ganapati Hegde	Suru's Talkies	
F E B	6	Bayakegalu Beruridaga	N. Jyothi Lakshmi	Aakarsh Adithya; Sharanya; Shylaja Joshi; Manasa Joshi	Unnathi Studio Private Limited	
F E B	6	Gharga	M. Shashidhar	Arun Ramprasad; P. Sai Kumar; Sampath Raj; Rahul Dev	ARC Musicq Pvt Ltd	
F E B	6	JC: The University	Chethan Jayram	Surya Prakyath; Bhavana Reddy; Thriller Manju; Rangayana Raghu	Dali Pictures	
F E B	6	Karikaada	K. Venkatesh	Kada Nataraj; Niriksha Shetty; Yash Shetty; Krithi Varma; Bala Rajwadi; Vijay Chendoor	Riddhi Entertainments	
F E B	6	Katle	Srividha Abhinandan	Kempegowda; Sanmitha Puttaraju; Amrutha Raj; Harshika Poonacha; Harish Raj; Tabla Nani	Bharath Gowda Movies	
F E B	6	Nenapugala Maathu Madhura	Afzal	Sevenraj; Afzal; Vasishta Bantanuru; Ranaveer	Sevenraj Arts	
F E B	6	Non Veg	K. Sooraj Shetty	Atharva Prakash; Sanjana Burli; Prakash Thuminad; Deepak Rai Panaje	Jayakirana Films	
F E B	6	Rajakreede	Umadevi S. L.	Omprakash Naik; M. D. Kaushik; Vishnu; Megha	Mahadeshwara Enterprises	
F E B	6	Rakkasapuradhol	Ravi Saranga	Raj B. Shetty; Swathishta; Archana Kottige	KN Entertainments	
F E B	6	Sarkari Shale H8	Guna Hariyabbe	Guna Hariyabbe; Gilli Nata; Meghashree; Raghavendra Rajkumar; Suchendra Prasad; Jaggappa	Girichandra Productions	
F E B	6	Sukhibhava	N. K. Rajesh Naidu	Mahendra; Sushmitha Nayak; Vihanshi Hegde; Gourav Shetty; Ravishankar Gowda	Ved Aryan Films	
F E B	6	After Operation London Cafe (Note: The film was produced in Marathi and Kannada languages.)	Sadagara Raghavendra	Kaveesh Shetty, Megha Shetty, Shivani Surve, Virat Madake	Indian Film Factory, Deepak Rane Films	
F E B	12	Daiva	M J Jayraaj	M. J. Jayaraaj; Surabhi Reddy; Neethu Rai; Bala Rajwadi	Kalpavruksha Creations	
F E B	12	Marali Manasaagide	Nagaraja Shankar	Arjun Vedanta; Nireeksha Shetty; T. S. Nagabharana; Smruthy Venkatesh	Kalpavruksha Creations	
F E B	13	Star	Vijaya Surya	Sharath Prakash; Rajatha Raksha; Vasudev M. Rao; Balaram Panchal	Lion Creations	
F E B	13	Maggi Pusthaka	Harivarasanam Kanakapura	Ranjan Kasaragod; Ranvee Shekhar; Raksha Gowda; Girija Lokesh	Chinnaswamy Films	
F E B	13	Rama and Ramu	Chandru Obaiah	Chandru Obaiah; Soumya Amarapurkar; Nagendra Urs; Mugu Suresh	Movies Fort Films	
F E B	20	Alpha	Vijay Nagendra	Hemanth Kumar; Gopika Suresh; Achyuth Kumar; Ayaana; Karthik Mahesh	L A Productions	
F E B	20	Doddanna Puttanna	R. Vijaya Kumar Hosur	R. Vijaya Kumar Hosur; Rajavamshi Navalgund; Nisha Koprekar; Swathi Chauhan	Ramachandra Film Company	
F E B	20	February 30	M. L. Prashanth	Abhishek Shrikanth; Akshay Nayak; Chayashree Umesh; Sahithya Shetty; Thandav Ram	Shankar Movies International	
F E B	20	Maarnami	Rishith Shetty	Rithvik Mathad; Chaithra J Achar; Sonu Gowda; Prakash Thuminad; Suman	Gunadhya Productions	
F E B	20	Mixing Preethi	Pollachi S. Mahalingam	Sinto Jacob; Samhita Vinya; Shriya Pavana; Priyanka Gopal; Divya Chandru	Sri Ayyappa Movies	
F E B	20	Sarala Subbarao	Manju Swaraj	Krishna Ajai Rao; Misha Narang; Rangayana Raghu; Veena Sundar; Vijay Chendoor	Rion Creations	
F E B	20	Second Case of Seetharam	Devi Prasad Shetty	Vijay Raghavendra; Gopalkrishna Deshpande; Sagar Puranik; Usha Bhandary	Flying Elephant Story Tellers	
F E B	20	Suri Anna	Salaga Suri Anna	Salaga Suri Anna; Sambrama Shree; Ravi Kale; Harish Rai	D J Prakash Cine Production	
F E B	27	Hayagrriva	Raghukumar	Dhanveer Gowda; Sanjana Anand; Sharath Lohitashwa; Sadhu Kokila	KVC Productions	
F E B	27	High Voltage Rakshak	Rajesh Murthy	Yashaswa Murthy; Harshitha Gowri; Rajesh Dharma Chakra		
F E B	27	Kanna Muchhe	Local Loki	Ravikrishna R; Tejaswini Gowda; Ugram Ravi; Prashanth Siddi	Krishi Studios	
F E B	27	Super Hit	Vijayanand	Gilli Nata; Gowrav Shetty; Shwetha V; Pramod Shetty	Vijayalakshmi Enterprises	
F E B	27	The Rise of Ashoka	Vinod V Dhondale	Sathish Ninasam; Sapthami Gowda; B. Suresha; Yash Shetty; P. Ravishankar; Gopalkrishna Deshpande; Sampath Maithreya	Vriddhi Creation; Sathish Picture House	
F E B	27	Veera Kambala	Rajendra Singh Babu	Aditya; Prakash Raj; Radhika Narayan; P. Ravishankar; Naveen D. Padil	Baba's Blessing Films	
M A R	6	Antaryaami	Dhananjaya K	Pranav N G; Mohira Acharya; Uday Ankaravalli; Siddu Mandya	Gururenuka Productions	
M A R	6	Gorgeous Rascal	R. Pramod Jois	Rajveer Singh; Prerana Bhat; Yuvin Yogesh; Chethan Mahesh	Adrushta Lakshmi Productions	
M A R	6	Jayakrishna	Raj Anandaram	Raj Anandaram; Rashmitha Shetty; Pranitha Ganiga	Om Film Productions	
M A R	6	Kanavarike	Sri Karthik Ram	Prajwal Madesh; Chillar Manju; Jogi Punga	Chigurele Films	
M A R	6	Majestic 2	Ramu S	Bharath Kumar; Samhita Vinya; Malashri; Shruti	Amma Enterprises	
M A R	6	Neeli	Pille Gowda	Prem Sagar Tadakal; Supritha Raj; Prerana Gowda; Mico Shivakumar	P. P. Production	
M A R	6	Oreo	Nandan Prabhu	Nithin Gowda; Subhi Joshi; Govinda Suchinth; Yuktha Pervi	Shivanjaneya Production	
M A R	6	Pancha Ratnagalu	Gowtham R	Yashas R; Aadhya Sonu; Vihaan V; Tanvi Anand; Pratham N. K		
M A R	6	Shesha 2016	Pradeep Arasikere	John Kaippallil; Pramod Shetty; Devaraj; Archana Kottige; Dain Davis	Maradigudda Entertainments	
M A R	13	Darji	Srinagara Chandru	Mico Manju; Pruthviraj; Nonavinakere Ramakrishnayya	Sri Siddeshwara Cinemas	
M A R	13	Kaadina Dari	Mandya Nagaraj	Mohan Gowda; Dhanya; Bheemanna Nayak; Apoorva	M N Movies	
M A R	19	Love Mocktail 3	Darling Krishna	Darling Krishna; Milana Nagaraj; Samvrutha Sunil; Amrutha Iyengar; Dileep Raj; Rachel David; Shwetha Prasad	KrissMi Films	
M A R	27	Ayudha	Devaraj Kumar	Devaraj Kumar; Amrutha; Samhita Vinya; Raghuraj Malnad; Sunil Beerur; Narayan; Surendra Kumar	Likhith Films	
M A R	27	Chamayya S/o Ramachari	Pallakki Radhakrishna	Pallakki Radhakrishna; Jayashri Raj; Prema Gowda; Chaitra Santhosh	Jolige Cinemas	
M A R	27	Janmadathe	K. S. Ravindranath Kanagal	Suneel Hubballi; Rajakumari; Apoorva; Moogu Suresh	SSHGS Film Company	
M A R	27	Yava Mohana Murali Kareyitu	Vishwas Krishna	Madhava H; Baby Prakruthi; Patel Varun Raju; Swapna Shettigar	Prakruthi Productions	

== April–June ==
Opening		Title	Director	Cast	Studio	Ref.
A P R	3	Aparichithe	Vishwanath Gopalakrishna	Srinath; Rohith Srinath; Sindhu Lokanath; Geetha Priya; RJ Nikitha	Amara Films	
A P R	3	First Night With Devva	PVR Swamy Googaredoddi	Pratham; Nikitha Swamy; Jeevitha Vasishta; Srinivasa Murthy; Ramesh Bhat; Harish Raj	Swarasya Cine Creations	
A P R	3	Naanu Karunakara	Aryan Tejas	Aryan Tejas; Radha Bhagavathi; Bhavish S. Gowda; Kari Subbu; M. K. Mutt; B. M. Venkatesh; Apoorva	Nam Popcorn Cinema	
A P R	3	Premi	Pradeep Varma	Advik Siddalingaiah; Shravya Rao; Dwitha Gowda; Pradeep Varma; Shobitha. M	Sri Guru Karibasaveshwara Production	
A P R	3	Psychic	Pushkara Girigowda	Sardar Sathya; Hamsa Prathap; Nikitha Dorthody; Kylas Dev	Silk Sinemas	
A P R	3	Simhapuriya Simha	K. Y. Murthy	K. Y. Murthy; Soujanya; Bank Janardhan; Padma Vasanthi; M. S. Umesh	Shri Hattimariyamma Films	
A P R	3	Vidhi	Maliyanna H.	Arunkumar; Shakunthala; Bala Rajwadi; Keshavamurthy; Chandrashekar	Seven Stars Productions	
A P R	10	Calendar	Naveen Shakti	Adarsh Gunduraj; Nivishka Patil; Sushmitha; Ramesh Indira; Pramod Shetty; Prakash Thuminad; Suchendra Prasad; Chandraprabha	Running Horse Creations	
A P R	10	Gangs of UK	Ravi Srivatsa	Orata Prashanth; Sonu Upadhya; Srinagar Muni; Jyothi Shetty; Kote Prabhakar; Padma Vasanthi; Amogh; Ravi Srivatsa	Deadly Arts	
A P R	10	Kaada	Vishruth Naik	Karthik Jayaram; Kavya Shetty; Achyuth Kumar; Ugram Manju; Sriram	Splendid Films	
A P R	10	Peter	Sukesh Shetty	Raajesh Dhruva; Raviksha Shetty; Jahnvi Rayala; Prathima Nayak; Ram Nadagoud	Vruddhi Studios	
A P R	10	Terror	Ranjan Shivaram Gowda	Aditya; Srinagara Kitty; Devaraj; Shashikumar; Kumar Bangarappa; Sharath Lohitashwa	Uppi Entertainers	
A P R	12	Whispers of the River	K. Prabhakaran	Manjunath Pai; Shabana; Prabhakar Kundar; Prabhakar Kalyani	Meena's Studio	
A P R	17	Bengaluru Inn	Karthik K. Murthy	Dharma Keerthiraj; Anusha Rai; Risha Gowda; Shashi Kumar; Bala Rajwadi; Manju Pavagada; Kumar Kanhaiya Singh	Sri Sai Baba Cine Enterprises	
A P R	17	Goggayya	Vasanth Dodmane	Vasanth Dodmane; Sneha; Vaibhav Nagaraj; Karthik Bhaskar	Vandana Enterprises	
A P R	17	Kendada Seragu	Rocky Somli	Malashri; Bhoomi Shetty; Sindhu Lokanath; Shobhita; Prathima Thakur; Mohan Kumar; Vardhan; Yash Shetty; Harish Arasu	Sri Muthu Talkies	
A P R	24	Elra Kaaleliyatte Kaala	Sujay Shastry	Chandan Shetty; Archana Kottige; H. G. Dattatreya; Tara; Manju Pavagada	Gokul Entertainers	
A P R	24	Ludo	D. Yogaraj	Sharan Raj Kasaragod; Jeevitha Prabhakar	Neelakanta Film Studio	Released on 24 April 2026
A P R	24	Puneeth Nivasa	Udbhava Nagendra Prasad	Abhijith; Vithal Nagaraj; Shankar Bhat; Sadananda Swamy; Shreyas; Aishwarya; M. S. Umesh; Dingri Nagaraj; Tennis Krishna; Rekha Das	Sree Panchami Cine Creations	
A P R	24	Sankeerthana	D. S. Manjunath	Ramesh Bhat; Sridhar; Ramakrishna; Nataraj Bhat; Ajay Raj; Vijayanand Nayak; K. Padmakala Gundurao; Vijaybhaskar Harapanahalli; Lavith A.	Saaphalya Movies	
A P R	30	KD: The Devil	Prem	Dhruva Sarja; Reeshma Nanaiah; Sanjay Dutt; V. Ravichandran; Ramesh Aravind; Shilpa Shetty	KVN Productions	
M A Y	8	Dhruti	Jagadish M	Prashanth Soppimath; Aanchal Gowdra; Bhavana Reddy	Fiction Riders Studios	
M A Y	8	Loop	Yashwantha Hassan	Shashikiran; Abhilash Narayan; Shobhitha; Manjula Urs	HM Films	
M A Y	8	Mathe Male Hoyyuthide	Param Gubbi	Likhit Gowda; Jay Vardhan; Bhumika Gowda; Sulaksha Khaira	Sri Gaviranganatha Swami Pitchers	
M A Y	8	Operation D	Tirumalesh V	Rudresh Budanur; Suhas Athreyas; Sneha Bhat; Inchara Bharathwaj	Advitha Film Factory	
M A Y	15	Lo Naveena	Dhanurdhari Pavan	Naveen Sajju; Varsha Giridhar; Reshma V. Gowda; Prakash Thuminad; Apoorva Shri; Ramesh Papayya	NS Studio	
M A Y	15	My Name Is KD	K. J. Chikku	Bhavani M. A.; Venkatesh D.; K. N. Srinivash; Girish Jatti; Aporva Shri	SSKB Productions	
M A Y	15	Sherr	Prasiddh	Kiran Raj; Tanisha Kuppanda; Surekha; Krish	Grace Raj Productions	
M A Y	15	Shikhandi	Gurumurthy V.	Yuvraj Gowda; Khyathei; Raj Deepak Shetty; Nikhil Maliyakkal; Bala Rajwadi; Nikitha Swamy; Neethu Vanajakshi; Raghavendra RK	Pola Movies	
M A Y	22	Asurana Kaiyalli Parijatha	Tejashvi Vighnesh	Yash Shetty; Pramod Shetty; Rajini Gowda; Karthik G N; Pradeep Poojari	Meeksha Pictures	
M A Y	22	Kuchuku	Mysuru Raju	Arjun Chauhan; Priyadarshini Gowda; Basavaraj Kumar; Shankar Ashwath	Sri Chamundeshwari Pictures	
M A Y	22	Lockdown	Javed Thippanahatti	Vijay Vignesh; Vanishree Srinivas; Manju Mudgal; Shravani	Abhinav Productions	
M A Y	22	Makkala Sainya	S. K. Sunil Kumar	Mahalakshmi; Gagana; Sonakshi; Shashank; Robert; Rudrappa	Vedanth S Movies and Production	
M A Y	22	Manga Maaya	Prasad Puttur	Radhesh Shenoy; Prakash Shenoy; Akshath Amin; Prasanna Puttur; Nithin Agarwal	Puttur Brothers Entertainment	
M A Y	22	Ugra Mardhini	Sathyanarayana Bheema Rao	Ayesha; Suraj Sasnur; Muni; Harish S. Pol; Raghavendra Prasad	SJBR Films	
M A Y	22	September 21 (Note: Shot simultaneously in Kannada and Hindi.)	Karen Kshiti Suvarna	Priyanka Upendra; Pravin Singh Sisodia; Zarina Wahab; Ajit Shidhaye; Amit Behl; Sachin Dilip Patekar; Ricky Rudra; Yuvin; Ankita Jayaram	Visica Films, FMD Productions, Humaramovie, FilmsMax	
M A Y	29	Gajendra C/O Doddarasinakere	C. Subramanya	Abhishek Ambi Subbanna; Vinay Ambi Subbanna; Thimma Raju; Veda N.; Nireeksha M. D.; Latha Shankari	Sri Kamalamma Combines	
J U N	5	Alexander	Prathap Rathan	Prathap Rathan; Adhvithi Shetty; Prakash Thuminad; Bala Rajwadi; Sunder Veena	KRP Studios	
J U N	5	Mango Pachcha	Viveka	Sanchith Sanjeev; Kaajal Kunder; Mayur Patel; Bhavana; Harini Shreekanth; Jai Gopinath	KRG Studios; Supriyanvi Productions	
J U N	12	Abhyanjana	Dinesh Baboo	Narayana Swamy; Apoorva Bharadwaj; Kari Subbu	Sri Lakshmi Narasimha Arts	
J U N	12	Kshame Irali Thande	M. N. Suresh	Manjunath Hegde; Renuka Bali; Shrimanth; M. N. Suresh	Sri Deviramma Mallikarjuna Swamy Films	
J U N	12	Maddane	K. Raaj Sharan	Arya; Latha Murthy; V. Srinivas Murthy; Raani R.; R. Ekambaram	LM Films	
J U N	12	Mruthyudevate	Naveen Mahadev	Mahin Kuber; Sarika Rao; Dayana Jessika; Hima Mohan; Vinaya Prasad; Madhu Surya	Varshitha Productions	
J U N	12	Uttara	Dinesh Baboo	Narayana Swamy; Tara; Ashwini Gowda; Samprathi Alva; Arjun Chauhan	Sri Lakshmi Narasimha Arts	
J U N	19	Dodmansa	Sharath Krishna	Sharath Krishna; Reshma Lingarajappa; Shilpa Shivakumar; Bala Rajwadi; Huli Kartik	Vedik Cosmos	
J U N	19	Educated Bulls	G. K. Mudduraj	Ajay Ram; Bhavya; Chidanand; Neeraj Manjunath; Poorvika Srinivasa Murthy; Rakesh Kotraiah Matth; Ranya Krishnamurthy; Tejas Kumar	MS Enterprises	
J U N	19	Kaalaghatta	K. Prakash Ambale	Abhi Das; Kushi P. S.; Gahana Gowda; Nithil M.; Prashanth Natana; Shobaraj; Bhavya; Ramesh Bhat	Deekshitha Enterprises	
J U N	19	Urabba	Shankar Lucky	Naresh Gowda; Tanisha Kuppanda; Payal Changappa; Mithra; Siddu Moolimani; Aravind Rao; Mimicry Gopi; Doddanna; Vaijanath Biradar; Bala Rajwadi	Ayush Enterprises	
J U N	26	Balaramana Dinagalu	K. M. Chaitanya	Vinod Prabhakar; Priya Anand; Atul Kulkarni; Sharath Lohitashwa; Ashish Vidyarthi; Vinay Gowda	Padmavathi Films	
J U N	26	Moda Kavida Vaathavarana	Suni	Sheelam M. Swamy; Moksha Kushal; Saathvika	Ram Movies	
J U N	26	Panchamukhi	Chandru Achar	Chandru Achar; Spoorthy Manohar; Shivganga; Pavan; Pruthvi; Tejas; Sandesh Shetty Ajri; Aftab Khan	SP Productions	

== July–September ==
Opening		Title	Director	Cast	Studio	Ref.
J U L	3	Aparadhi Nanalla	Yashwanth Kalladka	Arjun Kapikad; Amrutha Murthy; Pramod Shetty; Naveen D Padil	SLV Colors	
J U L	3	Deadly Killer	Thriller Manju	Thriller Manju; Abhay Veer; Niviksha Munirathnam; Puneeth Omkar	Keerthi Silver Screens; Vedik Cosmos	
J U L	3	Graamaayana	Devanuru Chandru	Vinay Rajkumar; Megha Shetty; Achyuth Kumar; Gopalkrishna Deshpande; Arun Sagar; Aparna; Yogesh; Bala Rajwadi	Lahari Films; Veenus Entertainment	
J U L	3	Nam kaaldal Hingirlilla Bidi	SS Amoghavarsha	SS Amoghavarsha; Rithya Gowda; Raaghu Ramanakoppa; Yashwanth MK; MC Theirtha; Chandramouli Prabhu	Hoysala Cine Production	
J U L	3	Love Seasons	Kruthvik	Mukunda Ramaswamy; Diya Keerthi; Chandana Gowda; Shwetha Koglur; Mandya Ramesh; Rajesh Nataranga	NR Studios	
J U L	10	Beauty	Raja Ravikumar	Ravikanth Poojary; Mahaalakshmi; Chillar Manju	Kalpavruksha Productions	
J U L	10	Boys Never Compromise	Harish T Jalgere	Samraat Parikshith; Suprith Kaati; Nakshatra Naina; Siddu Mandya	Marigold Studios; Universal Hatrick Combines	
J U L	10	Mother Promise	Poornachandra Mysore	Dhananjaya; Poornachandra Mysore; Nagabhushana; Vinaya Prasad; Geetha; Chi. Guru Dutt	Dali Pictures	
J U L	10	Rakky	Venkat Bharadwaj	Rakky Suresh; Ashika Somashekar; Pallavi Manjunath; B. Suresha	SNR Productions	
J U L	10	Shri Krishna	Shankar Raja Varma	Shankar Raja Varma; Chaitra Thotad; Pradeep Poojari; Bhuvan Betanahalli	Bruhaspathi Creations	
J U L	17	Devi	Kali Prasad	Chaya Rani; Kaveri Sridhar; Sukumar; Dhanalakshmi	Surya Vision	
J U L	17	Father's Day	Rajaram Rajendran	Ajith Hande; Harshil Koushik; All Ok; Samragni Rajan	Eleven Elements	
J U L	17	Sarvantharyami	Rangaswamy Kapanipalya	Auto Nagaraj; Thejaswini Jain; Myra; Amulya Narayan	Sri Lakshmi Padalamma Productions	
J U L	24	Karavali	Gurudatha Ganiga	Raj B. Shetty; Prajwal Devaraj; Sampada Hulivana; Mithra; Ramesh Indira; Sridhar	Ganiga Films	
J U L	31	Jolly	Tarush Krishna	Tarush Krishna; Padmashree Jain; Sushmitha Jagappa; Shobhraj; Rekha Das	Shri Adhishiva Creations; TBY Creations	
J U L	31	Sarkari Nyaya Bele Angadi	Sathwik Pawan	Kumar Bangarappa; Ragini Dwivedi; Doddanna	Jayashankar Talkies	
J U L	31	Shreemati Sindoora	R. Anantha Raju	Vijay Raghavendra; Priya Hegde; Manasi Sudheer; Ganesh Rao	R&R Enterprises	
J U L	31	Shri Ramarajya	Ashoka Ajanor Gadiyappa	Ashoka Ajanor Gadiyappa; Bhavani Gowda; Srinivas Prabhu; Ganesh Rao	Shri Hulibenki Chitra	
J U L	31	Tadviruddha	Vinod J Raj	Suchendra Prasad; Suman Ranganathan; Vikram Ramaiah; Aishwarya Shetty; Pooja Gowda	Charmion Motion Pictures	
A U G	6	Life Today	Kantha Kannalli	Kiran Adithya; Lekha Chandra; Yukta Pervi; Tabla Nani	Meghana Production House	
A U G	7	Akshara	S. Narendra Babu	Bhuvan Chandra; Almas Motiwala; Bhajarangi Prasanna; Ramesh Pandith	Vishmitha & Gitisha Creations	
A U G	7	Ayogya 2	S. Mahesh Kumar	Sathish Ninasam; Rachita Ram; P. Ravi Shankar; Sadhu Kokila; Tabla Nani; Sundar Raj; Giri Shivanna; Shivaraj K. R. Pete; Aruna Balraj	SVC Films	
A U G	7	Boss	V. Lava	Tanush Shivanna; Vanditha Gowda; Payal Chengappa; Sujanith Shetty	Siri Productions	
A U G	7	Detective Teekshana	Trivikram Raghu	Vijay Suriya; Priyanka Upendra; Wencita Dias; Avinash; K. S. Sridhar	Event Linkx Entertainment	
A U G	7	Picture	Sandeep Bedra	Nithyaprakash Bantwal; Amrutha Sudu; Naveen D Padil; Devadas Kapikad; Aravind Bolar	Golden Movies	
A U G	14	Chargesheet 03-08	Venkat Bharadwaj	Amarendran Manivannan; Harsh Arjun; Sathyashree; Sundar Raj; Venkat Bharadwaj	Arjun Films	
A U G	14	Chikkavaru Konaralla	Prakash Chinnappa	Santosh Shetty; Anita Bhat; Ramesh Bhat; Sundar Raj	HUE Arts Studios	
A U G	21	Bhagyashaali	Basavaraj Bhadravathi	Rohan Adhi; Panchami Nagaraj; Siddu Mandya; Shivanna Gowda	Likith Cinema's	
A U G	21	Brahmakamala	Siddhu Poornachandra	Advithi Shetty; Ruthu Chaithra; Lokendra Surya; Bala Rajwadi	Poornachandra Films	
A U G	21	Jaga Mecchida Maga	H. Manjunath	Guinness Pakru; H. G. Dattatreya; Ramesh Bhat; Padma Vasanthi	Power Star Creations	
A U G	26	Toxic (Note: The film was shot in Kannada and English languages)	Geetu Mohandas	Yash; Kiara Advani; Nayanthara; Tara Sutaria; Huma Qureshi; Rukmini Vasanth	KVN Productions; Monster Mind Creations	
S E P	4	A Date	Vimal Raj Nagaraj	Sujanith Shetty; Ashwini Shenoy	Weekend Shorts Studio	
S E P	4	Life Ellind Ellige	Arjun Shivan	Arjun Shivan; Naidile Kaveri; Michael Lenin; Anu Prema; Lee Krish	Vipra Ventures; Nayana Ventures	
S E P	11	America America 2	Nagathihalli Chandrashekar	Nirup Bhandari; Pruthvi Ambaar; Shanvi Srivastava; Achyuth Kumar	Nagathihalli Cine Creations	
S E P	11	Namma Range Rover	OSR Kumar	Aata Sandeep; Meghana Rajputh; Aravind Rao; Bank Janardhan	CMM Hindusthan Films	
S E P	11	Saalagaarara Sahakara Sangha	Vikram Dhananjaya R	Lokesh Bosco; Praveen Kumar Gasthi; Jolly Jack; Rakshitha Shivamogga; Prema Gowda	SNLNS Entertainers; Havish Cine Creations	
S E P	11	Video	Srinidhi Bengaluru	Bharath Tumkur; Jeevan Shivakumar; Priya J Achar; Tejesh Manjunath; Nalme Nachiyar	Dhee Cinemas	
S E P	18	Amartha	Vinay Pritham	Srinagara Kitty; Meghana Raj; Aravind Bolar; Guru Hegde; Pushparaj Bollar	Pancharangi Films	
S E P	18	Anireekshita Athithigalu	Manoj Annaiah	Vivek Simha; Samprathi Alva; Mythri Jaggi; Daya Pallavagere	Thejvin Productions	
S E P	18	Bentlee: The Brave Boy	Santhosh Balaraj	Santhosh Balaraj; Simran Natekar; Shruti; Charan Raj; Bala Rajwadi	Shwetha Balaraju Cine Enterprises	
S E P	18	Citylights	Duniya Vijay	Vinay Rajkumar; Monisha Vijaykumar; Umashree; Gopalkrishna Deshpande; B. M. Giriraj	Duniya Talkies; Yanthrodharaka Anjaneya Films; Seven Star Movies	
S E P	18	Kaandhari	Vinayaka Hegde Bomnalli	Shivananda Kalave; Lakshmish Sonda	Aakhyaana Productions	
S E P	18	Mahakavi	Baraguru Ramachandrappa	Kishore; Anusha Rai; Akanksh Baraguru; Sundar Raj; Pramila Joshai; Kumar Govind	P R Associates	
S E P	18	Toss	Arjun Kapikad	Arjun Kapikad; Sutej Shetty; Naveen D Padil; Aravind Bolar; Prakash Thuminad; Deepak Rai Panaje	Avika Productions; BRB Productions	
S E P	18	Warrior	Umesh Hebbal	Umesh Hebbal; Soumya Subhash; Bala Rajwadi; Roy Badiger; Rohini Kashyap	V B Films	
S E P	25	Bingo	Shankar Konamanahalli	R. K. Chandran; Ragini Dwivedi; Raksha Nimbargi; Rajesh Nataranga; Shravan Kumar	R K Studios; Muthara Ventures; Mirana Pictures	
S E P	25	Common Man	Om Sai Prakash	Gowrishankar SRG; Shona Ladwa; Sabby Suri; Bala Rajwadi; Prakash Thuminad; Ramesh Bhat	Surabhi Films	
S E P	25	Doctor 24/7	Dr. Vijay Kumar	Dr. Vijay Kumar; Dr. Prasad Shivanna; Dr. Nagaraj Narayan; Dr. Anjanappa Thimmaiah	Vibhinn Creations	
S E P	25	Heggana Muddu	Avinash Balekkela	Poornachandra Mysore; Aditi Sagar; Mysore Anand; Rekha Kudligi	Daali Pictures	
S E P	25	Premada Oorali	Manoj Kumar	Shree Raam; Thapaswini Poonacha; Rangayana Raghu; Ramika Shivu; Govinde Gowda	Vanilla Entertainment; Janakamma Productions	
S E P	25	Rou Sha Bi	S. R. Pramod	Aayur Swami; Manju Preethi; Rekha Ramesh; Balakrishna Baraguru	Spoorthi Cinemas	
S E P	25	Rudrabhishekam	Vasanth Kumar Kampli	Vijay Raghavendra; Priyanka Thimmesh; V. Manohar; Bala Rajwadi; Shashank Narayan; Manu	Pan India Creations	
S E P	25	Spark	Mahanthesh Handral	Niranjan Sudhindra; Prem Kumar; Bhavana Menon; Rachana Inder; Dharmanna Kadur; Abhay Vasishta	Garima Avinash Productions	

== October–December ==
Opening		Title	Director	Cast	Studio	Ref.
O C T O B E R	2	Bail	Pavan Wadeyar	Shiva Rajkumar; Jayaram; P. Sai Kumar; Yogesh; Dheekshith Shetty; Sangeetha Krish; Sanjana Anand	KVN Productions	
O C T O B E R	2	Huli Beera	Madarangi Mallikarjun	Rahul Anjan; Vanu Patil; Chaitra Totad; Rangayana Raghu	Sai Star Cinemas	
O C T O B E R	2	Karimani Malika Neenalla	Chandru Obaiah	Maruti Mattikoti; Ramika Sutar; Rekha Das; Cockroach Sudhir	Movies Fort Films	
O C T O B E R	2	Sumaa The Flower	Sai Rashmi	Pradeep Gowda; Manyata Naidu; Joe Simon; Bala Rajwadi; Vijayalakshmi Upadhyaya	Om Sai Cinemas	
O C T O B E R	2	Surya in Gandhinagar	Gururaj Ankola	Gururaj Ankola; Neha Basavaraj; Annapoorna Tholishetti; Shylesh Kengeri	Guruking Dreams Films	
O C T O B E R	2	Trikaaram	Dileep Kumar J. R.	Harshavardhan Kesari; Nischitha Shetty; Bala Rajwadi; Nagendra Urs; Manju Pavagada	Sadguru Cine Productions	
O C T O B E R	23	Shabari	Orata Shree	Samarth Ramesh; Kruthika Gowda; Dhanvi Chinnu; Ninasam Ashwath	Baravi Films	
O C T O B E R	30	Appu Garage	Chandrachoodeshwara Raju	Vishnu Theja; Jeevan Raj; Radhika Ram; Sumi Shah; Avinash	Thejas Productions	
O C T O B E R	30	Chandrahaasa	Ananda Shivappa Kalakabandi	Harish Hiriyur; Chayashree Umesh; Ningaraju Mandya; Santosh Keri; Suryakala	Amarashree Combines	
O C T O B E R	30	Gaamini	Guruprakash Belthangady	Anjan Thamaiah; Usha Poojari; Raju Belthangady	Lakshmipriya Production	
O C T O B E R	30	Khela	Bharath Vishnukanth	Vihaan Prabhanjan; Ashika Rao; Sangeetha Bhat; Yuvaraj Gowda	Bharath Films	
O C T O B E R	30	Mr. Lucky	Harshith Rangaswamy	Raam Tej; Rithi Shetty; Aishwarya Shetty; Raya Aradhya; Srinidhi Bengaluru	HR Visions	
O C T O B E R	30	Thaytha	Laya Kokila	Shaik Riyan; Shaik Shahid; Harshika Poonacha; Sadhu Kokila; Shobhraj	MS Productions	
N O V E M B E R	6	Bhavantara	Karthik Sharma	Karthik Sharma; Tanvi Rao; Pranav Sridhar; Shree Vaishnav	Kick Media and Einfach Studios	
N O V E M B E R	13	Amalaamrutha	Gururaja Rao	Govindarama Rao; Rama Vittal; Srikanth Raghotham; Deepak Lakshminarayana	Siri Krishna Productions	
N O V E M B E R	13	Janarinda Nanu Mele Bande	Navilugari Naveen	Gandharva Raj; Navilugari Naveen; Aapti Patwardhan; Abhijith; Kruthika Divakara	Sri Manjunatha Films	
N O V E M B E R	13	Kalusha	Shanmukh Shiva	Yuvaan Prathap; Aishwarya Muthuraj; Sangeeta Narendra; Bala Rajwadi; K. S. Sridhar	SPV Productions	
N O V E M B E R	13	Lambodhara 2.0	Suni	Anil Shetty; Kunal Kapoor; Saachi Bindra; Meghana Gaonkar; Mac D'Souza	Mass Productions	
N O V E M B E R	13	Naaguge Vadhu Bekaagide	Raj Karthik	Dattu Pujari; Chitral Rangaswamy; Apoorva Shri; Sonika Somanna; Rekha Das	Sri Guru Raghavendra Kannada Cinemas	
N O V E M B E R	13	Nee Nange Allava	Manoj P. Nadalumane	Rahul Arcot; Kaashima Rafi; Manjunath Hegde; Ravi Prakash	Suram Movies	
N O V E M B E R	13	Rashi	Vijay Palegar	Adithya Shashikumar; Sameeksha; Ramesh Indira; Tabla Nani; Veena Sundar; Manju Pavagada	Dhuvan Films	
N O V E M B E R	20	Brindavihari	Srinivas Raju	Ganesh; Devika Bhat; Malvika Sharma; Ramkumar; Lakshmi; Rangayana Raghu	KVC Productions	
N O V E M B E R	20	Maarige Daari	Agastya Narasimha	Agastya Narasimha; Cockroach Sudhi; Ankitha Gowda; Ananth Kumar Gowda	Radha Films	
N O V E M B E R	20	Shankarabharanna	Sumanth Bhat	Shine Shetty; Tanvi Ram; Sampath Raj; Deepak Rai Panaje; Mime Ramadas	Ranggasthala Studios	
N O V E M B E R	20	Vidooshaka	Yashwantha Bijoor	Ravi Salian; Amrutha Uppar; Aravind Rau; Yashwantha Bijoor	Yash Bijoor Productions	

== Upcoming releases ==
Title	Director	Cast	Production company	Ref.
666 Operation Dream Theatre	Hemanth M. Rao	Shiva Rajkumar, Dhananjaya, Priyanka Mohan	Vaishak J Films	
A for Anand	M. G. Srinivas	Shiva Rajkumar, Raveena Tandon, Tara, Anant Mahadevan	Geetha Pictures	
Anna from Mexico	Shankar Guru	Dhananjaya, Reeshma Nanaiah, Poornachandra Mysore, Nagabhushana	Rayala Studios; Aaira Films	
BMW	Gandharva Raya Rahut	Praveen Tej, Priyanka Malnad, Ekta Rathod, Chikkanna	Neeltop Productions	
Bhairavana Kone Paata	Hemanth M. Rao	Shiva Rajkumar	Vaishak J Films	
Billa Ranga Baasha	Anup Bhandari	Kichcha Sudeep, Vinay Gowda	Primeshow Entertainment	
Brindavihari	Srinivas Raju	Ganesh, Devika Bhat, Malvika Sharma	KVC Productions	
Criminal	Raj Guru	Dhruva Sarja, Rachita Ram, Tara	Goldmines Telefilms	
Daiji	Akash Srivatsa	Ramesh Aravind, Radhika Narayan	Vibha Kashyap Productions	
Father	Rajamohan.R	Krishna, Prakash Raj, Amrutha Iyengar, Nagabhushana	R. Chandru Cinemaas	
Godhraa	K. S. Nandeesh	Sathish Ninasam, Sonu Gowda, Vasishta N. Simha, Achyuth Kumar	Jacob Films	
Halagali	Sukesh Nayak	Dhananjaya, Sapthami Gowda, Prakash Raj	Duhara Movies	
Janarinda Naanu Mele Bande	Navilugari Naveen PB	Gandharva Raj, Navilugari Naveen PB, Soundarya, Krithika Diwakar, Pranav Sathish, Shanmukha Govindaraj	Navilugari Films	
Production#143	Jayanth Shetty	Jayanth Shetty	Devanga Productions	
Jingo	Shashank Soghal	Dhananjaya	Daali Pictures; Trishul Visionary Studios	
Jockey 42	Gurutej Shetty	Kiran Raj, Hrithika Srinivas, Deepak Rai Panaje, Bala Rajwadi	Golden Gate Studios	
Kantara: Chapter 2	Rishab Shetty	Rishab Shetty	Hombale Films	
Koragajja	Sudhir Attavar	Kabir Bedi, Bhavya, Shruti, Ganesh Acharya	Success Films; Trivikram Cinemas	
Lankasura	Pramod Kumar D S	Vinod Prabhakar, Parvathy Arun, Yogesh, Devaraj	Tiger Talkies	
Life is Beautiful	Sabu Aloysius	Pruthvi Ambaar, Lasya Nagaraj, Priyanka Upendra, Mahantesh Hiremath	Friday Films banner Silver Train International.	
Lord Gaaga	Sunil Kumar YK	Shoonya, Muki Regunathan, Swaroopinii Narayan, Disha Shetty	Zero Gravity Films	
Mafia	Lohith H	Prajwal Devaraj, Aditi Prabhudeva, Devaraj, Vasuki Vaibhav	Bangalore Kumar Films	
Mudhol	Karthik Rajan	Vikram Ravichandran; Sanjana Anand	Tandav Studios	
Next Level	Aravind Kaushik	Upendra, Aradhanaa Ram	Tarun Studios	
Ramarasa	B. M. Giriraj	Karthik Mahesh, Hebah Patel	G Cinemas	
Richard Anthony	Rakshit Shetty	Rakshit Shetty	Hombale Films	
Ugraayudham	Punith Rudranag	Sri Murali	Suram Movies	
Uttarakaanda	Rohit Padaki	Shiva Rajkumar, Diganth, Dhananjaya, Bhavana Menon, Aishwarya Rajesh	KRG Studios	
Yours Sincerely Raam	Vikhyath A. R.	Ganesh, Ramesh Aravind	The Rayala Studios	

== See also ==
- List of Kannada films
- List of Kannada films of 2025
