= Premada Oorali =

2026 Indian Kannada-language film

- Premada Oorali movie poster
- Directed by: Manoj Kumar
- Written by: Manoj Kumar (Story & Dialogue)
- Screenplay by: Devendra Medarametla
- Produced by: Mamatha Devendra; Prashanth D.S.; Ramesh N
- Starring: Shree Raam; Thapaswini Poonacha; Ramika Shivu; Rangayana Raghu
- Cinematography: Rajkanth S.K.
- Edited by: Harshith Prabhu
- Music by: Sunaad Gowtham
- Production companies: Vanilla Entertainments; Janakamma Productions
- Release date: 25 September 2026
- Running time: 155 minutes
- Country: India
- Language: Kannada
- Budget: ₹2 crore
- Box office: ₹154.32 crores

Premada Oorali (transl. In the Town of Love) is a 2026 Indian Kannada-language Musical drama film written and directed by Manoj Kumar. Produced jointly by Vanilla Entertainments and Janakamma Productions, the film stars Shree Raam, Thapaswini Poonacha, and Ramika Shivu in lead roles, alongside Rangayana Raghu in a supporting role. The film music is composed by Sunaad Gowtham, cinematography by Rajkanth S.K., and editing by Harshith Prabhu.

It was theatrically released across Karnataka on 25 September 2026. Initially opening with low earnings at the box office, the film later garnered positive reception through word of mouth from the third week of release and emerged as a sleeper hit. It is one of the most profitable Kannada films of all time, having been made on a reported budget of ₹2 crore. The movie became the 7th highest-grossing Kannada film at the time of its release and as of November 2026, it was also the second highest-grossing Kannada film of 2026.

== Plot summary ==
Set in a rural backdrop, Naganna, a widowed father who runs a farm in the village, is in search of an educated bride for his son, Santhu, to complete their family. Santhu is set on a path towards marriage with Rukmini, an educated girl who has returned to the village from the U.S. after getting her heart broken from an unfaithful ex-boyfriend. Meanwhile, the presence of Santhu's childhood friend, Vasantha, who holds unexpressed feelings for him, complicates the plot into an emotional love triangle. When Santhu is torn between his love Rukmini and his father’s insistence that he settle down, a conflict occurs.

== Cast ==
- Shree Raam as Santhu
- Thapaswini Poonacha as Rukmini
- Ramika Shivu as Vasantha
- Rangayana Raghu as Naganna
- Ila Vitla as Santhu grand mother
- Govinde Gowda as Broker Subba
- Abhishek Kalmani as Raju
- Abhi Mahesh

== Music ==
All music is composed by Sunaad Gowtham.

No.	Title	Lyrics	Singer(s)	Length
1.	"Premada Oorali (Title Track)"	Manoj Kumar	Chorus	1:37
2.	"Baanali Jaarida"	Abhijith Thirthahalli	Ninaada Nayak, Rajat Hegde	3:56
3.	"Eru Peru Hrudaya"	Manoj Kumar, Naveen Visharadh	Ninaada Nayak	3:51

== Release and reception ==
=== Critical response ===
The film received mixed-to-positive reviews from critics. Reviewers praised the lead performances and technical execution, while criticizing aspects of the screenplay. The Hindu stated that although the film leaned heavily on conventional melodrama and traditional framing devices, it was stabilized by the grounded performances of Rangayana Raghu and Shree Raam.

=== Box office ===
During its first week of theatrical release, the film grossed an estimated total of ₹7.92 crore within Karnataka. The movie grossed ₹23.65 crore in its second week. The movie was reported to have grossed ₹39 crores before the beginning of third Saturday. It grossed ₹67 crores in 19 days. The movie grossed a record ₹42 crores in Karnataka in its third week. The movie was reported to have collected ₹87 crores in 23 days. It grossed ₹93 crores worldwide in 24 days including ₹2.50 crores overseas. The collection within India was reported to be ₹95.31 crore. The movie grossed ₹100 crore in 22 days with the domestic gross reaching ₹104 crores in 25 days. The overseas collection in 26 days was reported to be ₹ 2.85 crores. The movie grossed ₹107.67 in 27 days including ₹3 crores from overseas. The movie grossed ₹27 crore in its fourth week domestically. The net domestic collection was reported to be ₹92.37 crore at the end of four weeks. The movie grossed ₹111.07 crore in 4 weeks worldwide including ₹28.50 in the fourth week. The gross domestic collection before the beginning of fifth weekend was reported to be ₹113 crores. The movie grossed ₹115 crores in one month. At the end of fifth weekend, the movie was reported to have grossed more than ₹118 crores domestically and ₹3.45 crores overseas. With a collection of ₹135 crores, the movie surpassed the Karnataka collections of KGF: Chapter 1. The movie grossed ₹142.80 crores in 32 days whereas at the end of 33 days, the worldwide gross was reported to be ₹144.68 crores. The movie grossed ₹150 crores before the end of sixth weekend. The movie was reported to have grossed ₹150 crores in 38 days. The movie surpassed the gross collections of James (2022) in 39 days.
