= Bigg Boss Kannada season 10 =

Tenth season of the reality TV series Bigg Boss Kannada

Bigg Boss Kannada
- Season 10
- Presented by: Sudeep
- No. of days: 112
- No. of housemates: 21
- Winner: Karthik Mahesh
- Runner-up: prathap
- No. of episodes: 113

Release
- Original network: Colors Kannada; JioCinema
- Original release: 8 October 2023 – 28 January 2024

Series chronology
- ← Previous; Season 9 Next → Season 11

Bigg Boss Kannada 10 is a reality show and the tenth season of the Indian Kannada-language reality television series Bigg Boss produced by Endemol Shine India (now merged with Banijay). The show began on 8 October 2023, on Colors Kannada and JioCinema, with Kichcha Sudeep as a host for the tenth time in a row. In the last week of Finale the makers of Bigg Boss announced the for the first time among all seasons, the season 10 has top six contestants stepped into the Grande Finale where one finalist was evicted one day before the ultimate day of the show.

Actor and model, Karthik Mahesh, won the Season 10 title. with Prathap being the Runner-Up and Sangeeta Sringeri as Second Runner-Up. The Bigg Boss Kannada 10 has soared to new heights as it received highest TRP (Television Rating point) of 7.9 TVR Across Karnataka, making a significant milestone.

== Telecast ==
Bigg Boss Kannada Season 10 is telecasted everyday on Colors Kannada and 24/7 live stream on JioCinema. It contains:

- Main episode (The main episode that is telecasted on Colors Kannada)
- 24/7 Live Channel (Live telecast from Bigg Boss house, on weekdays, only on JioCinema)[JioCinema 24/7 Live channel Ended on January 27, 2024 (11:50am) prior to Grand Finale.]

== Production ==
=== Theme ===
Then theme of this year's Bigg Boss is "Happy Bigg Boss" to celebrate the tenth anniversary of Bigg Boss Kannada.

=== Contestants ===
The show is sticking to the original format of the reality programme and it will only have celebrities who will be entering the house as contestants.

=== Format ===
The show follows selected contestants who are isolated from the outside world for 112 days (or 16 weeks) in a custom-built house. The housemates are dictated by an omnipresent entity named Bigg Boss. Each week, one or more of the housemates are evicted by a public vote. The last week, the housemate who gets the most votes, wins the game.

=== Partners ===
Powered by Freedom Refined Oil and Nippon Paint, Special Partners Levista Instant Coffee, Cera, Swastiks Masala and India Gate basmati rice, health partner Amrith Noni and restaurant partner Haldiram’s, and prize partner Confident Group.

== Housemate status ==
| Sr | Housemates | Day entered | Day exited | Housemates Status |
|---|---|---|---|---|
| 1 | Karthik | Day 0 | Day 112 | Winner |
| 2 | Prathap | Day 0 | Day 112 | 1st runner-up |
| 3 | Sangeetha | Day 0 | Day 112 | 2nd runner-up |
| 4 | Vinay | Day 0 | Day 112 | 3rd runner-up |
| 5 | Varthur | Day 0 | Day 15 | Ejected |
| 5 | Varthur | Day 23 | Day 112 | 4th runner-up |
| 6 | Santosh | Day 0 | Day 111 | 5th runner-up |
| 7 | Namratha | Day 0 | Day 105 | Evicted |
| 8 | Tanisha | Day 0 | Day 102 | Evicted |
| 9 | Michael | Day 0 | Day 91 | Evicted |
| 10 | Siri | Day 0 | Day 84 | Evicted |
| 11 | Avinash | Day 50 | Day 77 | Evicted |
| 12 | Pavi | Day 50 | Day 70 | Evicted |
| 13 | Snehith | Day 0 | Day 63 | Evicted |
| 14 | Neethu | Day 0 | Day 49 | Evicted |
| 15 | Bhagyashree | Day 0 | Day 42 | Evicted |
| 16 | Eshani | Day 0 | Day 41 | Evicted |
| 17 | Rakshak | Day 0 | Day 28 | Evicted |
| 18 | Gaurish | Day 0 | Day 14 | Evicted |
| 19 | Shyam | Day 0 | Day 7 | Evicted |
| 20 | Chitral | Day 0 | | Not Selected |
| 21 | Avinash | Day 0 | | Not Selected |

== Housemates ==
The list of contestants in the order of entering the house:

=== Original entrants ===
- Namratha Gowda: Serial Actress and Model
- Snehith Gowda: Serial Actor and Model
- Eshani Chandrashekar: Rapper and Singer
- Vinay Gowda: Actor and Fitness Trainer
- Avinash Surasundra: Actor, Writer, and Entrepreneur (Not selected)
- Drone Prathap: Self-Proclaimed Young Scientist
- Santhosh Kumar: Comedian
- SRK : Content Creator
- Binny Joseph: Social Activist and a Tv Actress
- Tanisha Kuppanda: Actress and Model
- Neethu Vanajakshi: Tattoo Artist and Model
- Siri Sirija: Actress
- Rakshak Bullet: Social Media Influencer
- Sangeetha Sringeri: Actress and Model
- Snake Shyam: Snake Conservationist
- Chitral Rangaswamy: Actress and Fitness Model (Not selected)
- Varthur Santhosh: Influencer and Cattle Brand Ambassador
- Bhagyashree Rao: Actress
- Gaurish Akki: News Anchor and Journalist
- Michael Ajay: Model and Fitness Trainer
- Karthik Mahesh: Actor and Model

=== Wild card entrants ===
- Avinash Shetty: Actor and Model
- Pavi Poovappa: Model

== Prize money ==
The winning contestant of Bigg Boss 10 Kannada will get the sum of 50 lakh rupees in addition to the trophy and other gifts, including Maruthi Suzuki Brezza and Bounce Infinity electric scooters.

== Twists ==
=== Public chooses housemates ===
After each contestant was introduced at the premiere, the viewers had the opportunity to vote them into the house. Housemates with at least 80% of the public vote were official contestants, those between 40 and 80% were put on hold and had to earn their way into the house, while those with less than 40% were evicted from the game on the day of premiere itself.

| Housemate | BB% | Status |
|---|---|---|
| Namratha | 86% | Selected |
| Snehith | 81% | Selected |
| Eshani | 83% | Selected |
| Vinay | 89% | Selected |
| Avinash | 27% | Rejected |
| Prathap | 41% | On Hold |
| Santhosh | 93% | Selected |
| Tanisha | 68% | On Hold |
| Neethu | 86% | Selected |
| Siri | 83% | Selected |
| Binny Joseph | 86% | Selected |
| Siri | 83% | Selected |
| Rakshak | 53% | On Hold |
| Sangeeta | 76% | On Hold |
| Shyam | 84% | Selected |
| Chitral | 38% | Rejected |
| Bhagyashree | 81% | Selected |
| Varthur | 78% | On Hold |
| Gaurish | 82% | Selected |
| Michael | 81% | Selected |
| Karthik | 76% | On Hold |
| Avinash | | Selected |
| Pavi | | Selected |

=== Housemate level status ===
High had privileges in the house whereas the Lows had to do all the house duties, had restricted access to facilities and wear orange suit for the first week

| Housemate | Day 1 | Day 3 | Day 6 | Day 7 | Day 50 |
|---|---|---|---|---|---|
| Karthik | Low | | | High | |
| Prathap | Low | | High | | |
| Sangeetha | Low | | | High | |
| Vinay | High | | | | |
| Varthur | Low | | High | | |
| Santhosh | High | | | | |
| Namratha | High | | | | |
| Tanisha | Low | | | High | |
| Michael | High | | | | |
| Siri | High | | | | |
| Avinash | | | | | High |
| Pavi | | | | | High |
| Snehith | High | | | | |
| Neethu | High | | | | |
| Bhagyashree | High | | | | |
| Binny Joseph | High | | | | |
| Eshani | High | | | | |
| Rakshak | Low | | High | | |
| Gaurish | High | | | | |
| Shyam | High | Low | High | | |
| Chitral | Rejected | | | | |
| Avinash | Rejected | | | | |

=== Ticket to finale ===
| Housemate | Ticket To Finale Tasks & Points | | | | | | | | | |
| Housemate | Task 1 | Task 2 | Task 3 | Task 4 | Task 5 | Task 6 | Task 7 | Task 8 | Total | Final |
| Housemate | Namratha | Tanisha | Varthur | Prathap | Vinay | Karthik | Sangeetha | Santhosh | Total | Final |
|---|---|---|---|---|---|---|---|---|---|---|
| Sangeetha | 30 | 0 | 30 | 100 | 50 | 0 | 50 | 40 | 300 | 3 |
| Prathap | 50 | 40 | 50 | 0 | 40 | 0 | 100 | 140 | 420 | 1 |
| Namratha | 0 | 50 | 0 | 0 | 30 | 100 | 30 | 0 | 210 | 1 |
| Varthur | 100 | 0 | 100 | 0 | 0 | 0 | 0 | 0 | 200 | Prathap |
| Vinay | 0 | 0 | 0 | 0 | 100 | 30 | 0 | 50 | 180 | Namratha |
| Karthik | 0 | 40 | 0 | 0 | 40 | 50 | 40 | 0 | 170 | Sangeetha |
| Santhosh | 40 | 30 | 0 | 0 | 40 | 0 | 0 | 30 | 140 | Sangeetha |
| Tanisha | 0 | 100 | 0 | 0 | 40 | 0 | 0 | 0 | 140 | Sangeetha |

Win Lost Partial Guessing Not eligible

=== Top 6 ranking ===
| Housemate | Top 6 Ranking | | | | | |
| Housemate | Rank 1 | Rank 2 | Rank 3 | Rank 4 | Rank 5 | Rank 6 |
|---|---|---|---|---|---|---|
| Karthik | Karthik | Vinay | Santhosh | Varthur | Sangeetha | Prathap |
| Prathp | Prathap | Sangeetha | Varthur | Santhosh | Karthik | Vinay |
| Sangeetha | Sangeetha | Prathap | Vinay | Varthur | Santhosh | Karthik |
| Santhosh | Santhosh | Varthur | Vinay | Karthik | Sangeetha | Prathap |
| Varthur | Varthur | Santhosh | Sangeetha | Vinay | Karthik | Prathap |
| Vinay | Vinay | Karthik | Sangeetha | Santhosh | Varthur | Prathap |

=== Finale week ===
The finale week of Bigg Boss Season 10 had total of Six contestants after Namratha Gowda being eliminated from show on last panchayat of Kiccha Sudeep, he also had stated that during finale week one contestant will be eliminated before Grand Finale and this was later called off by Bigg Boss. Contestants entering Finale week are Karthik Mahesh, Drone Prathap, Sangeetha Sringeri, Varthur Santhosh, Thukali Santhosh and Vinay Gowda.

== Guest appearances ==
| Week(s) | Day(s) | Guest(s) | Notes |
|---|---|---|---|
| Grand Premiere | Day 1 | Chandan Shetty | Launch Day |
| Grand Premiere | Day 1 | Manju Pavagada | Launch Day |
| Grand Premiere | Day 1 | Pratham | Launch Day |
| Grand Premiere | Day 1 | Shruti | Launch Day |
| Week 1 | Day 3 | Pradeep Eshwar | To motivate housemates |
| Week 1 | Day 4 | Pratham | As a BB dictator |
| Week 2 | Day 12 | Brundavana TV Show cast | To promote the show Brundavana |
| Week 2 | Day 14 | Dhananjaya/Jayanth Kumar | To promote their movie Tagaru Palya |
| Week 2 | Day 14 | Amrutha Prem | To promote their movie Tagaru Palya |
| Week 2 | Day 14 | Vasuki Vaibhav | To promote their movie Tagaru Palya |
| Week 3 | Day 16 | Tara | To celebrate Dasara |
| Week 6 | Day 36 | Sushma K. Rao | To celebrate Diwali and promote the show Bhagyalakshmi |
| Week 6 | Day 37 | Varthur Santhosh's mother | To motivate Varthur Santhosh |
| Week 7 | Day 43 - 45 | Narendra Babu Sharma aka Brahmanda Guruji | To umpire nomination and grocery Tasks for housemates. |
| Week 11 | Day 76 | Shruti | As a BB House Justice |
| Week 11 | Day 77 | Shine Shetty | Guest appearances |
| Week 11 | Day 77 | Shubha Poonja | Guest appearances |
| Week 12 | Day 79 | Namratha Gowda's mother and cousin | As a part of the Freeze task and to select captaincy contender for week 12. |
| Week 12 | Day 79 | Varthur Santhosh's mother | As a part of the Freeze task and to select captaincy contender for week 12. |
| Week 12 | Day 79 | Santhosh Kumar’s wife | As a part of the Freeze task and to select captaincy contender for week 12. |
| Week 12 | Day 79 | Michael Ajay’s mother | As a part of the Freeze task and to select captaincy contender for week 12. |
| Week 12 | Day 80 | Karthik Mahesh’s mother | As a part of the Freeze task and to select captaincy contender for week 12. |
| Week 12 | Day 80 | Siri Sirija’s sister and daughter | As a part of the Freeze task and to select captaincy contender for week 12. |
| Week 12 | Day 80 | Sangeetha Sringeri’s father, mother, brother and sister-in-law | As a part of the Freeze task and to select captaincy contender for week 12. |
| Week 12 | Day 81 | Tanisha Kuppanda‘s father, mother, and sister | As a part of the Freeze task and to select captaincy contender for week 12. |
| Week 12 | Day 81 | Vinay Gowda’s wife and son | As a part of the Freeze task and to select captaincy contender for week 12. |
| Week 12 | Day 81 | Drone Prathap’s father, mother and brother | As a part of the Freeze task and to select captaincy contender for week 12. |
| Week 12 | Day 83 | Sapthami Gowda | Government scheme promotion |
| Week 13 | Day 86 | Vidya Shankarananda Saraswati Guruji | To motivate housemates |
| Week 15 | Day 100 | Karthik Attavar and Amulya Gowda | To promote the serial Shri Gowri |
| Week 15 | Day 100 - 102 | Eshani and Neethu Vanajakshi | For reunion with housemates |
| Week 15 | Day 100 - 102 | Rakshak Bullet | For reunion with housemates |
| Week 15 | Day 100 - 102 | Michael Ajay | For reunion with housemates |
| Week 15 | Day 100 - 102 | Bhagyashree Rao | For reunion with housemates |
| Week 15 | Day 100 - 102 | Siri Sirija | For reunion with housemates |
| Week 15 | Day 100 - 102 | Snehith Gowda | For reunion with housemates |
| Week 16 | Day 107 | Kirik Keerthi and Jhanvi Mehta | As a BB news reporters |
| Week 16 | Day 112 | Nannamma Super star Season 3 contestant | To promote their new shows |
| Week 16 | Day 112 | Gicchi GiliGili | To promote their new shows |

== Nominations table ==
| | Week 1 | | | Week 2 | Week 3 | Week 4 | | Week 5 | Week 6 | Week 7 | Week 8 | Week 9 | Week 10 | | Week 11 | Week 12 | Week 13 | Week 14 | | Week 15 | Week 16 | | | |
| | Day 0 | Day 2 | | Week 2 | Week 3 | Day 22 | Day 23 | Week 5 | Week 6 | Week 7 | Week 8 | Week 9 | Day 64 | Day 65 | Week 11 | Week 12 | Week 13 | Day 93 | Days 93-96 | Week 15 | Day 106 | | Days 111-112 | |
|---|---|---|---|---|---|---|---|---|---|---|---|---|---|---|---|---|---|---|---|---|---|---|---|---|
| Nominees for Captaincy | No; Captain | | | Bhagyashree; Gaurish; Namratha; Santhosh; Snehith; Vinay | Karthik; Michael; Rakshak; Sangeetha; Snehith | Michael; Neethu; Santhosh; Tanisha | | Eshani; Namratha; Neethu; Rakshak; Santhosh; Snehith; Siri; Vinay | Bhagyashree; Karthik; Michael; Prathap; Sangeetha; Tanisha; Varthur | Karthik; Namratha; Prathap; Santhosh; Varthur | Michael; Neethu; Santhosh; Tanisha | Avinash; Namratha; Sangeetha; Snehith; Vinay | Avinash; Michael; Siri; Varthur | | No; Captain | Karthik; Namratha; Sangeetha; Vinay | Prathap; Sangeetha; Tanisha | Karthik; Michael; Namratha; Prathap; Sangeetha; Santhosh; Tanisha; Varthur; Vinay | | Karthik; Namratha; Prathap; Sangeetha; Santhosh; Tanisha; Varthur; Vinay | No; Captain | | | |
| House Captain | No; Captain | | | Snehith | Rakshak | Neethu | | Vinay | Michael | Karthik | ~~Neethu~~ | Snehith | ~~Varthur~~ | | No; Captain | Namratha | Tanisha | Sangeetha | | | No; Captain | | | |
| House Captain | No; Captain | | | Snehith | Rakshak | Neethu | | Vinay | Michael | Karthik | Michael | Snehith | ~~Varthur~~ | | No; Captain | Namratha | Tanisha | Sangeetha | | | No; Captain | | | |
| Captain's Nominations | No; Captain | | | Karthik; Tanisha | Eshani | Karthik | No | Karthik | Bhagyashree | Snehith; Vinay (to evict); Michael (to save) | Sangeetha; Siri; Varthur | Karthik; Prathap; Sangeetha; Siri; Tanisha (to evict); Namratha; Santhosh; Varthur; Vinay (to save) | No; Nominees | | No; Captain | Prathap (to save) | Michael | Prathap (to save) | | Prathap; Tanisha | No; Captain | | | |
| Vote to: | Evict | | | | | | Nominate Varthur | Evict | Task | | Evict | Task | Evict | Task | | | | Evict | Ticket To Finale | Evict | Finalist | Evict | WIN | |
| Karthik | On Hold | Not eligible | Not eligible | Bhagyashree; Santhosh | Namratha; Snehith; Vinay | Siri; Vinay | Yes | Eshani; Namratha; Neethu | Nominated | House; Captain | Namratha; Santhosh; Vinay | Nominated | Michael; Pavi; Varthur; Vinay | Karthik; Pavi; Santhosh; Siri; Varthur; Vinay | Avinash; Michael; Varthur | Prathap; Sangeetha; Varthur; Vinay | Michael; Prathap; Sangeetha; Santhosh | Tanisha; Varthur | Lost TTF | Prathap; Varthur | Finalist | Prathap; Varthur | No; Nominations | Winner (Day 112) |
| Prathap | On Hold | Not eligible | Not eligible | Santhosh; Tanisha | Michael; Snehith; Vinay | Santhosh; Vinay | No | Namratha; Snehith; Tanisha | Saved | Namaratha; Michael; Santhosh; Snehith | Namratha; Sangeetha; Vinay | Nominated | Michael; Pavi; Varthur; Vinay | Avinash; Pavi; Michael; Santhosh; Siri; Vinay | Michael; Vinay | Karthik; Santhosh; Tanisha; Vinay | Not eligible | Santhosh; Vinay | Lost TTF | Santhosh; Vinay | Finalist | Karthik; Vinay | No; Nominations | 1st runner-up (Day 112) |
| Prathap | On Hold | Not eligible | Not eligible | Santhosh; Tanisha | Michael; Snehith; Vinay | Santhosh; Vinay | No | Namratha; Snehith; Tanisha | Saved | Namaratha; Michael; Santhosh; Snehith | Namratha; Sangeetha; Vinay | Walked (Day 60) | Michael; Pavi; Varthur; Vinay | Avinash; Pavi; Michael; Santhosh; Siri; Vinay | Michael; Vinay | Karthik; Santhosh; Tanisha; Vinay | Walked (Day 88) | Santhosh; Vinay | Lost TTF | Santhosh; Vinay | Finalist | Karthik; Vinay | No; Nominations | 1st runner-up (Day 112) |
| Sangeetha | On Hold | Not eligible | Not eligible | Bhagyashree; Santhosh | Bhagyashree; Santhosh; Vinay | Santhosh; Vinay | Yes | Namratha; Neethu; Snehith | Saved | Santhosh; Tanisha | Michael; Santhosh; Varthur | Nominated | Michael; Pavi; Santhosh; Vinay | Pavi; Michael; Namratha; Santhosh; Siri; Vinay | Not eligible | Siri; Tanisha | Karthik; Vinay | House; Captain | Won TTF | House; Captain | Finalist | Karthik; Santhosh | No; Nominations | 2nd runner-up (Day 112) |
| Sangeetha | On Hold | Not eligible | Not eligible | Bhagyashree; Santhosh | Bhagyashree; Santhosh; Vinay | Santhosh; Vinay | Yes | Namratha; Neethu; Snehith | Saved | Santhosh; Tanisha | Michael; Santhosh; Varthur | Walked (Day 60) | Michael; Pavi; Santhosh; Vinay | Pavi; Michael; Namratha; Santhosh; Siri; Vinay | Not eligible | Siri; Tanisha | Karthik; Vinay | House; Captain | Won TTF | House; Captain | Finalist | Karthik; Santhosh | No; Nominations | 2nd runner-up (Day 112) |
| Vinay | Selected | Karthik; Sangeetha | Neethu; Shyam | Bhagyashree; Santhosh | Bhagyashree; Karthik; Tanisha | Not; Eligible | Yes | House; Captain | Nominated | Tanisha; Varthur | Prathap; Siri; Varthur | Saved | Avinash; Prathap; Tanisha; Varthur | Not eligible | Prathap; Sangeetha; Siri | Karthik; Siri | Karthik; Prathap; Varthur | Prathap; Varthur | Lost TTF | Prathap; Varthur | Finalist | Prathap; Varthur | No; Nominations | 3rd runner-up (Day 112) |
| Varthur | On Hold | Not eligible | Not eligible | Gaurish; Namratha | Ejected (Day 15) | | Not eligible | Eshani; Namratha; Snehith | Saved | Namratha; Siri | Namratha; Sangeetha; Vinay | Saved | Karthik; Pavi; Tanisha; Vinay | Karthik; Pavi; Michael; Siri; Tanisha; Vinay | Not eligible | Karthik; Tanisha | Not eligible | Karthik; Namratha | Lost TTF | Namratha; Vinay | Finalist | Karthik; Sangeetha | No; Nominations | 4th runner-up (Day 112) |
| Santhosh | Selected | Karthik; Sangeetha | Michael; Siri | Michael; Sangeetha | Prathap; Tanisha; Vinay | Not eligible | No | Bhagyashree; Eshani; Michael | Nominated | Namratha; Sangeetha (to evict); Varthur (to save) | Namratha; Sangeetha; Siri | Saved | Pavi; Sangeetha; Siri; Tanisha | Pavi; Michael; Prathap; Sangeetha; Siri; Vinay | Prathap; Sangeetha; Tanisha | Prathap; Siri | Michael; Namratha; Prathap | Namratha; Prathap | Lost TTF | Karthik; Prathap | Finalist | Prathap; Sangeetha | No; Nominations | Evicted (Day 111) |
| Namratha | Selected | Tanisha; Varthur | Michael; Shyam | Rakshak; Varthur | Bhagyashree; Prathap; Tanisha | Michael; Tanisha | Yes | Karthik; Sangeetha; Tanisha | Nominated | Prathap; Santhosh; Tanisha; Varthur | Prathap; Tanisha; Varthur | Saved | Avinash; Prathap; Sangeetha; Tanisha | Avinash; Karthik; Sangeetha; Siri; Tanisha; Varthur | Avinash; Sangeetha | House; Captain | Prathap; Santhosh; Varthur | Santhosh; Varthur | Lost TTF | Tanisha; Varthur | Evicted (Day 105) | | | |
| Tanisha | On Hold | Not eligible | Not eligible | Bhagyashree; Gaurish | Namratha; Prathap; Snehith | Rakshak; Vinay | No | Eshani; Namratha; Snehith | Nominated | Namratha; Sangeetha | Prathap; Sangeetha; Vinay | Nominated | Michael; Pavi; Santhosh; Vinay | Not eligible | Avinash; Michael; Santhosh | Not eligible | House; Captain | Namratha; Varthur | Lost TTF | Karthik; Namratha | Evicted (Day 102) | | | |
| Tanisha | On Hold | Not eligible | Not eligible | Bhagyashree; Gaurish | Namratha; Prathap; Snehith | Rakshak; Vinay | No | Eshani; Namratha; Snehith | Nominated | Namratha; Sangeetha | Walked (Day 51) | Nominated | Michael; Pavi; Santhosh; Vinay | Not eligible | Avinash; Michael; Santhosh | Not eligible | House; Captain | Namratha; Varthur | Lost TTF | Karthik; Namratha | Evicted (Day 102) | | | |
| Binny Joseph | Selected | Prathap; Rakshak | Snehith; Vinay | Bhagyashree; Gaurish | Bhagyashree; Sangeetha; Tanisha | House; Captain | | Eshani; Tanisha; Varthur | Nominated | Nominated | Evicted (Day 49) | | | | | | | | | | | | | |
| Michael | Selected | Karthik; Prathap | Siri; Vinay | Bhagyashree; Santhosh | Bhagyashree; Prathap; Siri | Rakshak; Siri | Yes | Bhagyashree; Namratha; Neethu | House; Captain | Saved | House; Captain | Nominated | Avinash; Prathap; Sangeetha; Tanisha | Not eligible | Karthik; Prathap; Sangeetha; Siri | Sangeetha; Siri | Not eligible | Evicted (Day 91) | | | | | | |
| Siri | Selected | Prathap; Rakshak | Michael; Shyam | Gaurish; Michael | Karthik; Michael; Vinay | Michael; Vinay | Yes | Eshani; Neethu; Santhosh | Saved | Santhosh; Varthur | Michael; Tanisha; Varthur | Nominated | Avinash; Karthik; Pavi; Vinay | Karthik; Pavi; Sangeetha; Santhosh; Tanisha; Varthur | Avinash; Michael | Not eligible | Evicted (Day 84) | | | | | | | |
| Avinash | Not In House | | | | | | | | | | | Nominated | Michael; Pavi; Siri; Vinay | Not eligible | Not eligible | Evicted (Day 77) | | | | | | | | |
| Pavi | Not In House | | | | | | | | | | | Nominated | Avinash; Sangeetha; Tanisha; Varthur | Not eligible | Evicted (Day 70) | | | | | | | | | |
| Snehith | Selected | Prathap; Varthur | Neethu; Shyam | House; Captain | Karthik; Prathap; Sangeetha | Not eligible | Yes | Bhagyashree; Tanisha; Varthur | Saved | Nominated | Prathap; Siri; Varthur | House; Captain | Evicted (Day 63) | | | | | | | | | | | |
| Neethu | Selected | Prathap; Rakshak | Snehith; Vinay | Bhagyashree; Gaurish | Bhagyashree; Sangeetha; Tanisha | House; Captain | | Eshani; Tanisha; Varthur | Nominated | Nominated | Evicted (Day 49) | | | | | | | | | | | | | |
| Bhagyashree | Selected | Karthik; Tanisha | Eshani; Shyam | Neethu; Sangeetha | Karthik; Michael; Vinay | Snehith; Vinay | No | Eshani; Namratha; Varthur | Nominated | Evicted (Day 42) | | | | | | | | | | | | | | |
| Eshani | Selected | Tanisha; Varthur | Gaurish; Shyam | Bhagyashree; Santhosh | Bhagyashree; Karthik; Prathap | Not eligible | Yes | Sangeetha; Santhosh; Tanisha | Nominated | Evicted (Day 41) | | | | | | | | | | | | | | |
| Rakshak | On Hold | Not eligible | Not eligible | Michael; Prathap | House; Captain | Not eligible | No | Evicted (Day 28) | | | | | | | | | | | | | | | | |
| Gaurish | Selected | Prathap; Varthur | Michael; Siri | Michael; Siri | Evicted (Day 14) | | | | | | | | | | | | | | | | | | | |
| Shyam | Selected | Prathap; Varthur | Gaurish; Neethu | Evicted (Day 7) | | | | | | | | | | | | | | | | | | | | |
| Chitral | Not; Selected | Evicted (Day 0) | | | | | | | | | | | | | | | | | | | | | | |
| Avinash | Not; Selected | Evicted (Day 0) | | | | | | | | | | | | | | | | | | | | | | |
| Notes | 1, 2, 3, 4, 5, 6 | | | 7, 8 | 9, 10, 11, 12 | 13, 14, 15, 16 | | 17, 18, 19, 20 | 21, 22, 23, 24, 25 | 26, 27, 28, 29, 30 | 31, 32, 33, 34, 35, 36, 37, 38 | 39, 40, 41, 42, 43, 44, 45, 46, 47 | 48, 49, 50, 51, 52 | | 53, 54, 55 | 56, 57, 58 | 59, 60, 61 | 62, 63, 64, 65 | | 66, 67, 68, 69, 70 | 71, 72, 73 | | | |
| Against Public votes | All Housemates | Karthik; Prathap; Michael; Neethu; Shyam; Siri; Tanisha; Varthur | | Bhagyashree; Gaurish; Karthik; ~~Michael~~; Sangeetha; Santhosh | Bhagyashree; Eshani; Karthik; Michael; Neethu; Prathap; Snehith; Tanisha; ~~Vinay~~ | Karthik; Michael; Rakshak; Santhosh; Siri; Snehith; Tanisha; Varthur; Vinay | | ~~Bhagyashree~~; Eshani; Karthik; Namratha; Neethu; ~~Sangeetha~~; Santhosh; Snehith; ~~Tanisha~~; Varthur | Bhagyashree; Eshani; Karthik; Namratha; Neethu; Santhosh; Tanisha; Vinay | Namratha; Neethu; ~~Michael~~; Prathap; Sangeetha; Santhosh; Siri; Snehith; Tanisha; ~~Varthur~~; Vinay | Michael; Namratha; Prathap; Sangeetha; ~~Santhosh~~; ~~Siri~~; Snehith; Tanisha; Varthur; Vinay | Avinash; Karthik; Michael; Pavi; Prathap; Sangeetha; Siri; Snehith; Tanisha | ~~Avinash~~; Michael; Pavi; Prathap; Sangeetha; Siri; ~~Tanisha~~; Vinay | | Avinash; Michael; Prathap; Sangeetha; Siri; Varthur | Karthik; Michael; Sangeetha; Santhosh; Siri; Tanisha; Varthur; Vinay | Karthik; Michael; Prathap; Santhosh; Varthur | Karthik; Namratha; ~~Prathap~~; Santhosh; Tanisha; Varthur; Vinay | | Karthik; Namratha; Prathap; ~~Tanisha~~; Varthur; Vinay | Karthik; Prathap; Sangeetha; Santhosh; Varthur; Vinay | | | |
| Best Performer | Tanisha | | | Rakshak | Michael | ~~Vinay~~ | | Prathap | Santhosh | Santhosh | Namratha | Avinash | Santhosh | | Vinay | none | Karthik | Prathap | | Sangeetha | none | | | |
| Best Performer | Tanisha | | | Rakshak | Neethu | Snehith | | Prathap | Santhosh | Santhosh | Namratha | Pavi | Santhosh | | Vinay | none | Karthik | Prathap | | Sangeetha | none | | | |
| Worst Performer | Bhagyashree | | | Eshani | Snehith | Sangeetha | | Eshani | Tanisha | Varthur | Santhosh | Karthik | Pavi | | Sangeetha | Varthur | Michael | Santhosh | | Prathap | none | | | |
| Worst Performer | Bhagyashree | | | Eshani | Snehith | Sangeetha | | Neethu | Tanisha | Varthur | Prathap | Karthik | Pavi | | Sangeetha | Varthur | Michael | Santhosh | | Prathap | none | | | |
| Kicchana Chappale | none | | | | Neethu | Sangeetha | | Prathap | none | Michael | Namratha | Karthik | Santhosh | | none | | Varthur | none | | Sangeetha | none | | | |
| Kicchana Chappale | none | | | | Neethu | Sangeetha | | Prathap | none | Michael | Namratha | Karthik | Santhosh | | none | | Varthur | none | | Vinay | none | | | |
| Re-entered | none | | | | | Varthur | | none | | | Tanisha | Prathap | none | | | | Prathap | none | | | | | | |
| Re-entered | none | | | | | Varthur | | none | | | Tanisha | Sangeetha | none | | | | Prathap | none | | | | | | |
| Ejected | none | | | | Varthur | none | | | | | | | | | | | | | | | | | | |
| Walked | none | | | | | | | | | | Tanisha | Prathap | none | | | | Prathap | none | | | | | | |
| Walked | none | | | | | | | | | | Tanisha | Sangeetha | none | | | | Prathap | none | | | | | | |
| Evicted | Avinash | Shyam | | Gaurish | No; Eviction | Rakshak | | No; Eviction | Eshani | Neethu | No; Eviction | Snehith | Pavi | | Avinash | Siri | Michael | No; Eviction | | Tanisha | Santhosh | | Varthur | Vinay |
| Evicted | Avinash | Shyam | | Gaurish | No; Eviction | Rakshak | | No; Eviction | Eshani | Neethu | No; Eviction | Snehith | Pavi | | Avinash | Siri | Michael | No; Eviction | | Tanisha | Santhosh | | Sangeetha | |
| Evicted | Chitral | Shyam | | Gaurish | No; Eviction | Rakshak | | No; Eviction | Bhagyashree | Neethu | No; Eviction | Snehith | Pavi | | Avinash | Siri | Michael | No; Eviction | | Tanisha | Santhosh | | Prathap | Karthik |

indicates the House Captain.
indicates the Nominees for house captaincy.
indicates that the Housemate was directly nominated for eviction prior to the regular nomination process.
indicates that the housemate went to secret room.
indicates that the Housemate was granted immunity from nominations.
indicates the winner.
indicates the first runner up.
indicates the second runner up.
indicates the third runner up.
indicates the fourth runner up.
indicates the fifth runner up.
indicates a new wildcard contestant.
indicates the contestant has been walked out of the show.
indicates the contestant has been evicted.
indicates the contestant was not eligible.

== Notes ==
- ^Note 1: Avinash & Chitral were rejected by the audience, and thus were evicted on the premiere itself.
- ^Note 2: Bhagyashree, Binny Joseph, Eshani, Gaurish, Michael, Namratha, Neethu, Santhosh, Shyam, Snehith, Siri, and Vinay were selected housemates.
- ^Note 3: Karthik, Prathap, Rakshak, Sangeetha, Varthur, and Tanisha were put on hold and had to perform weekly tasks to sustain in the house.
- ^Note 4: Karthik, Prathap, Rakshak, Sangeetha, Varthur, and Tanisha, on-hold housemates were not eligible to nominate.
- ^Note 5: Bhagyashree, Eshani, Gaurish, Michael, Namratha, Neethu, Santhosh, Shyam, Siri, Snehith, and Vinay, had to nominate from on-hold housemates, Karthik, Prathap, Rakshak, Sangeetha, Varthur, and Tanisha.
- ^Note 6: Day 2, Bhagyashree, Eshani, Gaurish, Michael, Namratha, Neethu, Santhosh, Shyam, Siri, Snehith, and Vinay have to nominate each other.
- ^Note 7: Snehith became the first house captain of Bigg Boss Kannada season 10.
- ^Note 8: Day 8, Bhagyashree, Gaurish, Michael, Sangeetha, and Santhosh have to play an immunity task. Michael won the immunity from the task and saved the week 2 eviction process.
- ^Note 9: Evicted housemate Gaurish directly nominated Neethu for the week 3 eviction process.
- ^Note 10: Varthur, was ejected from the house on Day 15 under the Wildlife (Protection) Act, 1972 for wearing a tiger claw pendant on launch day.
- ^Note 11: Bhagyashree, Eshani, Karthik, Michael, Prathap, Snehith, Tanisha, and Vinay had to play an immunity task. Vinay won the task, received immunity from the task, and saved the week 3 eviction process.
- ^Note 12: Since Varthur's ejection, Host Kichcha Sudeep announced no eviction on week 3.
- ^Note 13: Prathap and Karthik won the task, and Prathap selected Bhagyashree, Namratha, Sangeetha, Siri, Tanisha, and Karthik selected Michael to the nomination process and other housemates are not eligible to nominate.
- ^Note 14: Day 22, Varthur re-entered the house.
- ^Note 15: Housemates chose between nominate Vathur or not to nominate for week 4 eviction process. The majority voted to nominate Vathur.
- ^Note 16: Best Performer was changed to Snehith after a discussion in the Saturday episode
- ^Note 17: Prathap's team won task 1, and Prathap gave immunity to Bhagyashree and saved the week 5 eviction process.
- ^Note 18: Prathap team won task 2, and Prathap gave the immunity to Sangeetha, saved the week 5 eviction, and permanently nominated Snehith for week 5 eviction.
- ^Note 19: Prathap's team won task 3, and Prathap gave the immunity to Tanisha, saved the week 5 eviction process.
- ^Note 20: Host Kichcha Sudeep used special power and announced no eviction on week 7.
- ^Note 21: Week 6, Bigg Boss gives tasks as part of Nominations.
- ^Note 22: Captain Michael directly nominated Bhagyashree for the week 6 eviction process.
- ^Note 23: The remaining housemates have to make a group of 3, and housemates had to mutually decide to nominate and save for the week 6 eviction process.
- ^Note 24: (Eshani-nominated, Neethu-nominated, and Siri-saved), (Karthik-nominated, Sangeetha-saved, and Tanisha-nominated), (Namratha-nominated, Snehith-saved, and Vinay-nominated) and (Prathap-saved, Santhosh-nominated, and Varthur-saved) for week 6 eviction process.
- ^Note 25: Host Kichcha Sudeep announced this week's double elimination on Day 41 Eshani was evicted, and on Day 42 Bhagyashree was evicted.
- ^Note 26: Week 7, Bigg Boss gives tasks as part of Nominations.
- ^Note 27: Neethu, was directly nominated for the week 7 nomination process due to the week 6 letter task.
- ^Note 28: Captain Karthik saved Michael from week 7 eviction process.
- ^Note 29: Santhosh received an advantage from week 6 evicted housemate Bhagyashree, And he saved Varthur from week 7 eviction process.
- ^Note 30: In Week 7, Neethu won captaincy and became the captain of Week 8. However, Neethu got evicted on Day 49 and was directly removed from Captaincy.
- ^Note 31: Neethu was given the option to select a captain from housemates and she selected Michael as the Week 8 House Captain but didn’t get the immunity from saving week 8 eviction.
- ^Note 32: Snehith directly nominated from breaking rules.
- ^Note 33: On Day 50 Avinash entered the house as wildcard housemates.
- ^Note 34: On Day 50 Pavi entered the house as wildcard housemates.
- ^Note 35: Avinash and Pavi save Santhosh and Siri from the week 8 eviction process.
- ^Note 36: On Day 51, Tanisha walked out of the house due to injury in week 8.
- ^Note 37: On Day 54, Tanisha re-entered the house.
- ^Note 38: Host Kichcha Sudeep used special power and announced no eviction on week 8.
- ^Note 39: Host Kichcha Sudeep directly nominated Michael and Snehith for the week 9 eviction process.
- ^Note 40: Housemates directly nominated Avinash and Pavi for the week 9 eviction process.
- ^Note 41: Week 9, Bigg Boss gives tasks as part of Nominations.
- ^Note 42: The remaining housemates have to debate with the pair and Captain Snehith decides who is nominated and saved.
- ^Note 43: (Sangeetha-nominated and Santhosh-saved), (Namratha-saved and Prathap-nominated), (Siri-nominated and Vinay-saved), and (Karthik-nominated, Tanisha-nominated, and Varthur-saved) for week 9 eviction process.
- ^Note 44: On Day 61, Prathap walked out of the house due to an injury in week 9.
- ^Note 45: On Day 60, Sangeetha walked out of the house due to injury in week 9.
- ^Note 46: On Day 62, Prathap re-entered the house on the Weekend episode.
- ^Note 47: On Day 62, Sangeetha re-entered the house on the Weekend episode.
- ^Note 48: Host Kichcha Sudeep revoked captaincy from Varthur due to the unfair captaincy task.
- ^Note 49: Week 10, no captain or captain nomination.
- ^Note 50: Evicted housemate Snehith gave special power to Namratha from the Week 10 nomination process.
- ^Note 51: On Day 65, housemates had to choose 4 contestants who would not have the power to nominate. Using a special power given by Snehith, Namratha had to do all the nominations. Housemates who were eligible to nominate could save 2 from the nominated list, but should also add another 2 to the nomination list.
- ^Note 52: Avinash and Tanisha were saved and Prathap, Sangeetha, and Siri were nominated.
- ^Note 53: Bigg Boss canceled the captaincy task due to the punishment.
- ^Note 54: Week 11, no captain or captain nomination.
- ^Note 55: Namratha chose Avinash, Sangeetha, and Varthur were not eligible to be nominated for the week 11 nomination process.
- ^Note 56: Michael was directly nominated for week 12, due to last week's bottom 2 elimination.
- ^Note 57: Housemates didn’t have a chance to nominate anybody for Siri and Tanisha, they are not eligible to nominate for the week 12 nominations process.
- ^Note 58: Captain Namratha directly saves Prathap from the week 12 elimination process.
- ^Note 59: Michael, Prathap, and Varthur received less amount from the task and they are not eligible to nominate for the week 13 nomination process.
- ^Note 60: On Day 88, Prathap walked out of the house due to an injury in week 13.
- ^Note 61: On Day 90, Prathap re-entered the house.
- ^Note 62: Evicted housemate Siri gave special power to Sangeetha.
- ^Note 63: Captain Sangeetha saved Prathap from week 14 eviction process.
- ^Note 64: Sangeetha won ticket to finale task.
- ^Note 65: Host Kichcha Sudeep announced no eviction on week 14.
- ^Note 66: Sangeetha became the last house captain of Bigg Boss Kannada season 10.
- ^Note 67: Tanisha was evicted on Day 102 during a midweek eviction on week 15.
- ^Note 68: Sangeetha became the best performer of the Bigg Boss Kannada season 10.
- ^Note 69: Prathap became the worst performer of the Bigg Boss Kannada season 10.
- ^Note 70: Sangetha and Vinay receive the Kicchana Chappale of the Bigg Boss Kannada season 10.
- ^Note 71: Sangeetha became the first finalist of Bigg Boss Kannada season 10 and directly entered into Grand finale week.
- ^Note 72: Karthik, Prathap, Sangeetha, Santhosh, Varthur, and Vinay became the finalists of Bigg Boss Kannada season 10.
- ^Note 73: Karthik, Prathap, Sangeetha, Santhosh, Varthur, and Vinay were directly nominated for the finale week to win. Santhosh was evicted on D111 with the lowest votes to win while the rest of the finalists moved on to D112 where their results were announced.
