= Gajarama =

Indian Kannada-language action drama film

- Theatrical release poster
- Directed by: Sunil Kumar V. A.
- Written by: Sunil Kumar V. A.
- Produced by: Narasimha Murthy V.
- Starring: Raja Vardan; Thapaswini Poonacha
- Cinematography: K. S. Chandrashekar
- Edited by: Jnaanesh B. Matad
- Music by: Mano Murthy
- Production company: Life Line Films
- Release date: 7 February 2025
- Running time: 131 minutes
- Country: India
- Language: Kannada

Gajarama is a 2025 Indian Kannada-language action drama film written and directed by Sunil Kumar V. A. The film stars Raja Vardan and Thapaswini Poonacha.

== Plot ==
Rama (Rajavardan), a young man from a small village in Karnataka dreams of becoming a national-level wrestling champion. His immense physical strength earns him the nickname "Gajarama," symbolizing his power and determination. Rama trains under Rudrappa (Sharath Lohitashwa), a former wrestling champion who sees his own unfulfilled dreams reflected in Rama and mentors him with unwavering support.

Rama's childhood crush, Anjali (Thapaswini Poonacha), returns to the village from Bengaluru. Rama hopes to confess his love, but his world shatters when Anjali hands him her wedding invitation, she is engaged to ACP Pratap (Deepak). Heartbroken, Rama channels his pain into his wrestling ambitions, focusing on winning a national championship. His journey leads him to Bengaluru, where fate brings him face-to-face with Anjali again, intertwining his personal struggles with his professional aspirations.

As Rama prepares for a crucial wrestling competition, he becomes entangled in a dangerous subplot involving Anjali's fiancé and a ruthless antagonist, Alex (Kabir Duhan Singh). This conflict adds layers of tension, forcing Rama to choose between his lifelong dream and unresolved emotions.

== Cast ==
- Raja Vardan as Rama
- Thapaswini Poonacha as Anjali
- Shishya Deepak as ACP Pratap
- Kabir Duhan Singh
- Sharath Lohitashwa as Rudrappa
- Ragini Dwivedi as Saaraayi Shanthamma (Special appearance)

== Soundtrack ==
Gajarama

Soundtrack album by Mano Murthy
- Released: 2025
- Genre: Feature film soundtrack
- Length: 25:54
- Language: Kannada
- Label: Anand Audio

Mano Murthy chronology
Pranayam (2024)	Gajarama (2025)
External audio
- Gajarama — Jukebox on YouTube

The soundtrack was composed by Mano Murthy.

Track listing
No.	Title	Lyrics	Singer(s)	Length
1.	"Saaraayi Shaantamma"	Chinmay Bhavikere	Mangli, Kunal Ganjawala	4:19
2.	"Gajarama" (Title Track)	Bharjari Chethan Kumar	Hemanth Kumar	4:19
3.	"Kanasale Kavithe"	Chinmay Bhavikere	Sonu Nigam	3:39
4.	"Ella Helabekide"	Jayanth Kaikini	Shreya Ghoshal, Shaan	4:08
5.	"Kaaldaari Kavalaagi"	Pramod Maravanthe	Siddhartha Belmannu	4:20
6.	"Gajarama" (Theme 1)	—	—	1:02
7.	"Gajarama" (Theme 2)	—	—	1:37
8.	"Gajarama" (Trailer Theme)	—	—	2:30
Total length:				25:54

== Release ==
Gajarama was released theatrically on 7 February 2025.

== Reception ==
Sridevi S. of The Times of India rated the film two-and-a-half out of five stars and wrote, "Director Sunil Kumar has helmed a commercial caper and has played safe with familiar tropes. Ragini Dwivedi is a visual treat as Sarayi Shantamma in the dance number. Gajarama offers nothing new in terms of story or filmmaking." A. Sharadhaa of The New Indian Express gave it two-and-a-half out of five stars and wrote, "While the emotional depth and themes of ambition, love, and failure hold promise, the film's uneven pacing and lack of refinement prevent it from fully realising its potential. It’s a journey of grit and heart, but one that feels incomplete in its execution."

Y. Maheswara Reddy of Bangalore Mirror gave it two-and-a-half out of five stars and wrote, "Rajavardan has improved a lot when compared to his previous movies. He is at his best in action scenes, especially in wrestling. He needs to hone his dancing skills though. Tapaswini Poonacha looks good and has acted well."
