= Iruvudellava Bittu =

2018 Kannada film directed by Kantha Kannalli

- Directed by: Kantha Kannalli
- Written by: Kantha Kannalli
- Produced by: Devraj Davanagere
- Starring: Meghana Raj; Tilak Shekar; Shri Mahadev; Achyuth Kumar; Sundeep Malani
- Cinematography: William David
- Edited by: K. M. Prakash
- Music by: Sridhar V. Sambhram
- Production company: Bilwa Creations
- Release date: 21 September 2018
- Country: India
- Language: Kannada

Iruvudellava Bittu is a 2018 Indian Kannada-language drama movie directed by Kantha Kannalli, who did his debut in the Kannada Film industry as an independent director in 2017 through Jalsa, and produced by Devraj Davanagere, featuring Meghana Raj, Tilak Shekar, Achyuth Kumar, Shri Mahadev, and Sundeep Malani. The soundtrack and score are composed by Sridhar V. Sambhram, known for super hit music albums Mussanjemaatu and Krishnan Love Story. William David, famous for his great work in Rangitharanga and Rajaratha, has worked as a DOP, and Raajakumara fame K. M. Prakash edited the movie. Meghana Raj won the Karnataka State Film Award for Best Actress for her performance as "Poorvi" for this Kannada movie in 2018.

== Plot ==
An intelligent and courageous girl, Poorvi (Meghana Raj), is brought up in a sophisticated environment and is inclined towards the corporate lifestyle. As per her wish, she decides to stay away from all her relatives and close ones. She is in a live-in relationship with Dev (Tilak Shekar) by choice. Due to her ego and self-conceit, she is unable to lead a happy life. Eventually, she separates from Dev during pregnancy. After a few years, because of her imprudent decision, she is ready to take her own life. Akash (Shri Mahadev), while saving her on the road meets with an accident, she decides to save him and indirectly saves herself. Later, inspired by Akash's lifestyle, will she change her mind to lead a beautiful life again? Will she be able to set right her family again? Will she get back to her parents who loved her the most? Will she get back to her love, Dev again? Or will she get settled with Akash, who inspired her to change her mind? This forms the curious journey of the movie.

== Cast ==
- Meghana Raj as Poorvi
- Tilak Shekar as Dev
- Achyuth Kumar as Poorvi's father
- Shri Mahadev as Aakash
- Aruna Balraj as Poorvi's mother
- Sundeep Malani

== Production ==
Iruvudellava Bittu, which has been made under Devaraj Davanagere's newly launched banner Bilwa Creations, has Sridhar V. Sambhram's music, William David's cinematography, and K. M. Prakash's editing. Pavan Ranadheera was the creative head of this film.

== Soundtrack ==
Sridhar V. Sambhram has been signed to compose the score and songs for the film. The lyrics for the songs were written by V. Nagendra Prasad, Kaviraj, Kantha Kannalli, and Jayanth Kaikini.

No.	Title	Singer(s)	Length
1.	"Kuniri Thakkatha"	Silambarasan
2.	"Cheluve Nee"	Siddhartha Belmannu
3.	"Kannugale"	Sanjith Hegde, Shashwathi Kasyap
4.	"Yaavudee Daari"	Shashwathi Kasyap
5.	"Cheluve Nee Bandu"	Santhosh Venky
6.	"Ee Jeevana"	Ganesh Karanth

== Reception ==
A critic from The News Minute wrote that "For Sandalwood, Iruvudellava… is indeed a bold attempt. Except for some lag before the interval, the film does what it is supposed to do – entertain for a good three hours". A critic from The Times of India wrote that "While the film has a sweet narrative, and has a formulaic ending, this could have been a bit more. But those looking for conventional cinema with emotions, sentiments and drama, peppered with romance, this could be just what you might enjoy". A critic from The New Indian Express wrote that "An entertainer, Iruvudellava Bittu is a film that puts relationships to test".

== Awards ==
- 2018: Karnataka State Film Award for Best Actress
- 2019: Nominated – Filmfare Award for Best Actress – Kannada
- 2019: Nominated – Filmibeat Award for Best Actress – Kannada
