= Shikhandi (2026 film) =

2026 Indian Kannada language film

- Release poster
- Directed by: Gurumurthy V
- Written by: Dayashankar GM
- Produced by: Pola Praveen Kumar
- Starring: Yuvraj Gowda; Khyathei; Raj Deepak Shetty; Nikhil Maliyakkal
- Cinematography: Swamy Mysore
- Edited by: Chakram Sai
- Music by: Manju Kavi
- Production company: Pola Movies
- Release date: 15 May 2026
- Running time: 137 minutes
- Country: India
- Language: Kannada

Shikhandi is a 2026 Indian Kannada language film directed by Gurumurthy V The film stars Yuvraj Gowda, Khyathei and Raj Deepak Shetty in the lead role.

== Cast ==
- Yuvraj Gowda as Surya
- Khyathei as Sangeetha
- Raj Deepak Shetty as Rajendra
- Nikhil Maliyakkal as Poornachandra
- Bala Rajwadi as Mokshendra
- Nikitha Swamy as Maheshwari
- Neethu Vanajakshi
- Raghavendra RK

== Reception ==
Yemen S. of The Times of India said that "Shikhandi may not fully deliver on all fronts, it still manages to be a decent one-time watch, especially for audiences who enjoy paranormal thrillers with a mythological touch." A. Sharadhaa of the Cinema Express said that "Shikhandi stands as a testament to Gurumurthy V’s visual ambition but also a reminder of the perils of narrative clutter. It is an atmospheric experience that rewards your patience, but leaves you wishing that its storytelling had the same sharpness as its visuals." Y. Maheswara Reddy of the Bangalore Mirror said that "Yuvaraj Gowda and Khyathei both have tried their best, but they need to hone their skills. If you are interested in the miracles of Renuka Devi Yellamma and the story of Shikandi, you can watch this film."
