= Harikathe Alla Girikathe =

- Theatrical release poster
- Directed by: Karan Ananth; Anirudh Mahesh
- Written by: Giri Krishna
- Produced by: Sandesh Nagaraj
- Starring: Rishab Shetty; Thapaswini Poonacha; Rachana Inder
- Cinematography: Chandrasekaran; Ranganath C. M.
- Edited by: Bharath M. C. Pradeep R. Rao
- Music by: Vasuki Vaibhav
- Production companies: Sandesh Productions; Rishab Shetty Films
- Distributed by: Jayanna Films
- Release date: 23 June 2022
- Running time: 125 minutes
- Country: India
- Language: Kannada

Harikathe Alla Girikathe is a 2022 Indian Kannada-language comedy-drama film written by Giri Krishna and directed by Karan Ananth and Anirudh Mahesh. It stars Rishab Shetty in a dual role alongside Thapaswini Poonacha, Honnavalli Krishna, Rachana Inder, and Anirudh Mahesh. The music was composed by Vasuki Vaibhav. Film Produced by Sandesh Nagaraj under Sandesh Productions

Harikathe Alla Girikathe was released on 23 June 2022 where it received mixed reviews from critics.

== Plot ==
Giri Honnavali Krishna is the son of actor Honnavalli Krishna, and an aspiring director, who arrives in Bangalore with an intention to find a producer for his film, but faces multiple rejections from the production house, and lives with his friend Prasanna.

One day, Giri meets Kushi, the daughter of MLA Jokumaraswamy, and decide to seek her help in convincing Jokumaraswamy in producing his film. Giri falls for Kushi, and manages to seek Jokumaraswamy's approval. However after winning the election, Jokumaraswamy refuses due to some issues. Due to this, Giri breaks up with Kushi and decide to produce a film by himself. Giri arrives at the bank to seek a loan, where he gets into a misunderstanding by assuming a person and his friends to be robbers and nabs them where a lady Inspector also arrives.

However, Giri gets cleared of the misunderstanding after learning about the persons; Villain-Giri, who aspires to play the role of villain in films and works under an agarbatti distributor; Girija Thomas, an aspiring actress who arrived at the bank to con people for their money. Giri, Villain-Giri and Girija soon become friends and they, along with Girija's brother 5D Thomas, "Mobile" Raghu and Super Super; team up with Giri for his upcoming film. The gang decide that the only way to make money is by kidnapping people without the victims complaining to the police.

They rent a van and disguise it as an ambulance and tries various tactics to kidnap rich people, but to little success and are always confronted by Inspector Abhimanyu, but manages to fool him everytime. However, the gang manages to kidnap a woman, only for Giri to find that they have kidnapped Kushi. Giri demands Jokumaraswamy to bring ₹30 lakhs in order for Kushi's release. Despite being trailed by Abhimanyu, who learnt the kidnapping, the gang manages to retrieve the money and leave for Goa to begin the film shooting, where Kushi also accompanies him, lying to her father that she is with her friends.

Giri manages to renew his relationship with Kushi, and they reunite. When the shooting begins, the gang finds that the bag, which contains the film's script is missing, and they learn that Salman and Usman, two garage boys who are Villain-Giri's acquaintances, stole it as they learn about the gang's involvement in kidnapping and thinking that the bag contains money as they were two bags in the van. The gang doesn't head back to Bangalore as the police are searching for them. Giri gets an idea about making the film based on their own experience in kidnapping Kushi, and the film gets completed and released with the title Harikathe alla Girikathe.

However, Abhimanyu nabs the gang due to Usman and Salman getting caught. Giri ask Abhimanyu to give him time seeing the audience and his father's reaction, but the latter refuses. A direct clash ensues where Giri manages to escape from Abhimanyu and finds that his father and audience are having a happy time watching the film. The gang's arrest is blocked by Jokumaraswamy and Kushi, where Giri and his father happily talk to each other, while the gang attend the press conference regarding the film.

== Cast ==
- Rishab Shetty in a dual role as
  - Giri Honnavalli Krishna
  - himself
- Thapaswini Poonacha as Kushi Jokumaraswami, MLA's Daughter
- Rachana Inder as Girija Thomas
- Honnavalli Krishna in a dual role as
  - Girish, Giri's father
  - himself
- Pramod Shetty as Inspector Abhimanyu
- Anirudh Mahesh as 5D Thomas
- Rakshith Ramachandra Shetty as Villain Giri
- Deepak Rai Panaaje as Prasanna, Giri's friend
- Kiran Chandrashekhar Shetty as Super Super
- Raghu Pandeshwar as Mobile Raghu
- P. D. Sathish Chandra as Bank Manager
- Dinesh Mangaluru as Jokumaraswamy
- Salman Ahmed as Salman
- Vivek Gowda as Rapper
- Shashank M C as Usman
- Shine Shetty as Talkative lover
- Sandesh Nagaraj as himself (Cameo)
- Kiranraj K. as himself (Cameo)
- Chandrajith Belliyappa as himself (Cameo)
- Yogaraj Bhat as himself (Cameo)

== Release ==
Harikathe Alla Girikathe was released on 23 June 2022.

=== Critical response ===
Sunayana Suresh of The Times of India gave 3 out of 5 stars and wrote "While there are fun elements, there are sequences that hold back that momentum of the narrative. One wishes the story was more tightly woven to ensure a seamless ride. The filmmakers seem to have conceptualised a crazy ride, which does merit a one-time watch." A. Sharaadha of Cinema Express gave 3 out of 5 stars and wrote "While Harikathe Alla Girikathe scores high on the entertainment factor, it isn’t flawless. However, backed by a solid cast and crew, the director duo make a mark with their very first film, which is definitely a decent watch."

Vivek M. V of Deccan Herald gave 3 out of 5 stars and wrote "'Harikathe Alla Girikathe' is an ode to the strugglers in cinema. It shows the plight of outsiders who try to break into the big, bad world of the film industry. It bats for artistes who are either stuck on the margins or not in the limelight, like the under-paid crew members or the stereotyped character artistes." Swaroop Kodur of OTTplay gave 3 out of 5 stars and wrote "Harikathe Alla Girikathe, is a rollicking ride that promises a genuine dose of laughter, along with a few tear-jerking moments. The film might seem a derived one in terms of the genre and structure but the makers infuse originality through their characters and a strong, endearing emotional core. Sure, the film falls slightly short in certain aspects but there is enough and more to experience this mad caper on the big screen. Watch the film with your close ones for a story that's free of double entendres and a clean heart."
