= Dollu (film) =

- Directed by: Sagar Puranik
- Produced by: Pawan Wadeyar; Apeksha Purohit
- Starring: Karthik Mahesh; Nidhi Hegde
- Cinematography: Abhilash Kalathi
- Edited by: B S Kemparaju
- Music by: Ananth Kamath
- Production company: Wadeeyar Movies
- Release date: 26 August 2022
- Running time: 106 minutes
- Country: India
- Language: Kannada

Dollu is a 2022 Indian Kannada-language drama film written and directed by Sagar Puranik and produced by Pawan Wadeyar and Apeksha Purohit under the banner of Wadeeyar Movies. The film stars Karthik Mahesh, Nidhi Hegde, Chandra Mayura and Babu Hirannaiah.

Dollu was released on 26 August 2022 and was critically acclaimed. At the 68th National Film Awards, the film won two awards for Best Feature Film – Kannada and best audiography.

== Plot ==
Bhadra, a dollu kunitha artist, is torn between regrouping his Dollu team to keep the age-old traditions of his ancestors alive and fighting with his team members who are shifting to the city, as their art doesn't provide enough remuneration.

== Cast ==
- Karthik Mahesh as Bhadra
- Nidhi Hegde as Priya
- Chandra Mayur as Kaalappa
- Babu Hirannaiah as Purohit
- Sharanya Suresh as Lachchi
- Dr. Prabhudeva D.S
- Gowtham
- Chandramanu K.G.R
- Gangadhar
- Ravikiran
- Nayana
- Chandrakala Sagara
- Varun Srinivas
- Gurumurthy Varadamula
- Vijayalakshmi
- Vishwanath

== Soundtrack ==
The music was composed by Ananth Kamath.

No.	Title	Singer(s)	Length
1.	"Mayanagari - Theme of Bengaluru"	Sagar Puranik	1:48
2.	"Shashwata"	Vijay Prakash	3:19
3.	"Enembaro"	Ramavva Jogtai, Anjinamma Jogati, Bhagyamma Jogati	2:15
4.	"Denoucement"	Ananya Suresh, Priyan	5:56
5.	"Demise"	Suhasini Puranik, Chinmai Kashyap, Sagar Puranik	2:25

== Reception ==
A critic from The Times of India rated the film four out of five stars and wrote that "Dollu definitely will remain one of the most refreshing tales that have been told in recent times". A critic from Deccan Herald rated the film three-and-a-half out of five and wrote that "Sagar uses powerful images to portray conflict between an aged father and a young son. Aspects like passion and inevitability, tradition and modernity are weaved well into the story".
