= Jolly (2026 film) =

Indian Kannada language film

- Poster
- Directed by: Tarush
- Produced by: Brij Yadav; Nagaveni N
- Starring: Tarush; Padmashree C Jain; Shobharaj; Rekha Das
- Cinematography: Yogeshwaran R
- Music by: Nithinraj
- Release date: 31 July 2026
- Country: India
- Language: Kannada

Jolly is a 2026 Indian Kannada language action romance drama film directed by Tarush. The film is produced by Brij Yadav, and Nagaveni N. The film stars Tarush, Padmashree C Jain, Shobhraj, Rekha Das in the lead role.

== Synopsis ==
In an age where love and marriages crumble over broken trust, Jolly and Jaanu build theirs on the one thing missing everywhere else - complete faith in each other. But Jaanu's doting father, unwilling to give his daughter away, sets out to break them apart. When trust is the only thing holding them together, will it be enough?

== Cast ==
- Tarush
- Padmashree C Jain
- Shobhraj
- Rekha Das
- D. Krishnappa Venugopal
- Sushmitha Jagappa
- Mahantesh Hiremath
- Abhi Samrat
- Bharath Shivanna

== Reception ==
A. Sharadhaa of The New Indian Express said that " Tarush makes a confident debut as an actor. He handles both romantic and action scenes well, and his dance numbers have good energy ,Jolly shows that Tarush understands the elements of a mainstream film. What holds it back is the attempt to include too much in one project." Y. Maheswara of the Bangalore Mirror said that "Shobhraj, Mahantesh Hiremath provide good support. Rekha Das's dialogues and acting skills make audiences happy. The movie is worth a watch if you enjoy action movies." Govindaraj S of Asianet News said that "The film showcases Tarush's enthusiasm and hard work. His effort to establish himself in the film industry is clearly evident. This is one such engaging attempt."
