= Karthik Mahesh =

Indian Kannada actor

- Education: Bachelor of Science
- Occupation: Actor
- Known for: Bigg Boss Kannada (season 10)

Karthik Mahesh (born 7 October) is an Indian actor who primarily works in Kannada movies and television. He is mainly known for his film Dollu. In 2023 he participated as a contestant in Bigg Boss Kannada season 10 and emerged as the winner of the show.

== Career ==
In 2022, he acted in the Kannada-language film Dollu, and the television serials Puttakkana Makkalu, Akka, Bangari and Antarapata also in Kannada. He played a role in the film Ondu Sarala Prema Kathe directed by Simple Suni. He has nine years' experience in the film industry.

In 2023, after 112 days in the house, Mahesh won the Bigg Boss Kannada Season 10 hosted by actor Sudeep. Apart from the glittering cup, he also won a cash prize of Rs.50 lakh, a Brezza car and an e-scooter.

== Filmography ==
Year	Film	Role	Notes
2022	Dollu	Bhadra	
2024	Ondu Sarala Prema Kathe	Ekanjith	
2024	Mooku Jeeva		
2025	Moksha Patam	Ameesh	Short Film
2026	Alpha: Men Love Vengeance	Special appearance	

=== Television ===
Year	Title	Role	Channel	Notes
2021–2022	Puttakkana Makkalu	Chandru	Zee Kannada	Left in 2022
	Akka		ETV Kannada	
	Bangari		Colors Super	
2023–present	Antarapata		Colors Kannada	
2023–2024	Bigg Boss Kannada	Participant	Colors Kannada	Season 10; winner

Preceded by Roopesh Shetty (2022)	Bigg Boss Kannada Winner (Series 10) 2023	Succeeded by Hanumantha Lamani (2024)
