= Valavaara =

2026 Indian Kannada language film

- Release poster
- Directed by: Sutan Gowda
- Written by: Sutan Gowda
- Produced by: Anirudh Gautham; Giridhar Jayakumar
- Starring: Vedic Kaushal; Master Shayan
- Cinematography: Manu Shankar
- Edited by: Srikanth Sh
- Music by: Manikanth Kadri
- Production company: Morph Productions
- Distributed by: Sherlin Pictures
- Release date: 30 January 2026
- Running time: 113 minutes
- Country: India
- Language: Kannada

Valavaara is a 2026 Indian Kannada-language family drama film directed by Sutan Gowda. The film stars Vedic Kaushal, Master Shayan, Malathesh H.V. Gowda, and Harshitha R Gowda in the lead role. It Began Digital Streaming from 5th June 2026 on ZEE5 in Kannada , Hindi , Tamil and Telugu.

== Cast ==
- Vedic Kaushal as Kundesi
- Master Shayan as Kosudi
- Malathesh H.V. as Appa
- Harshitha R. Gowda as Amma
- Abhay S. as Yedhu

== Reception ==
Vivek M.V. of The Hindu said that "A heart-warming film, Valavaara reminds viewers how the Kannada big screen had missed the feeling of tenderness. The slow-growing friendship between Yadhu and Kundesi is fleshed out beautifully. The writing triumphs, as despite tonal shifts, we are never detached from the proceedings." Sruthi Ganapathy Raman of The Hollywood Reporter India said that "Valavaara could've been much tighter and done without a few syrupy scenes along the way, but the writing still keeps us occupied. The film largely resists the genre's saccharine tendencies and sticks to simple human-led stories." A Shradhaa of The New Indian Express said that "Master Vedik Kaushal anchors the film with remarkable restraint, expressing Kundeshi's fear, anger, and resolve through internalised gestures rather than overt emotion. His silence often carries more weight than dialogue, especially as the crisis around the missing cow deepens." Susmita Sameera of The Times of India said that "Valavaara is a simple film with profound emotional depth. It moves you in understated ways, through quiet smiles, unspoken emotion, and reflection, ultimately leaving you with warmth and the sense that moving forward, even quietly, can be an act of hope."
