= Maggi Pusthaka =

2026 Indian Kannada language film

- Poster
- Directed by: Harivarasanam Kanakapuri
- Starring: Ranjan Kasaragod; Ranveer Shekhar
- Release date: 13 February 2026
- Country: India
- Language: Kannada

Maggi Pusthaka is a 2026 Indian Kannada language film directed by Harivarasanam Kanakapuri. The film stars Ranjan Kasaragod, Ranveer Shekhar, and Raksha Gowda in the lead role.

== Cast ==
- Ranjan Kasaragod
- Ranveer Shekhar
- Raksha Gowda
- Mysore Ramanand
- Meghashree Kannadathi
- Raghu Eamanakoppa Girija Lokesh
- Shobhraj

== Reception ==
A. Sharadhaa of The New Indian Express said that "The film works best as a reminder of a recent past that still feels close, a time when education depended on signal strength and shared screens. It is sincere in what it wants to say, and the performances are honest, but the impact is softened by an over-explained narrative and a tendency to lean on familiar emotional cues instead of sharper observation." Y. Maheswara Reddy of Bangalore Mirror said that "Despite a lengthy runtime and a few unnecessary scenes, the film delivers a meaningful message about digital addiction and the enduring power of books."
