= Amruthaanjan =

2026 Indian Kannada language film

- Theatrical release poster
- Directed by: Jyothi Rao Mohith
- Written by: Jyothi Rao Mohith
- Produced by: Vijayakumar DH; Lokesh Nagappa
- Starring: Gowrav Shetty; Payal Chengappa; Sudhakar Gowda; Pallavi Parva
- Cinematography: Sumanth Acharya
- Edited by: Kiran Kumar
- Music by: Rohit Sower
- Production company: Lasya Vijay Entertainers
- Release date: 30 January 2026
- Running time: 153 minutes
- Country: India
- Language: Kannada

Amruthaanjan is a 2026 Indian Kannada-language film written and directed by Jyothi Rao Mohith. The film stars Gowrav Shetty, Payal Chengappa, Sudhakar Gowda, and Shree Bhavya in the lead role.

== Cast ==
- Gowrav Shetty
- Payal Chengappa as Urmi Aradhana
- Sudhakar Gowda as Jagan Rai Mohan
- Naveen Padil as Jagan's Father
- Shree bhavya
- Pallavi Parva as Frooti
- Karthik Ruvary as Umesh

== Reception ==
Susmita Sameera of The Times of India said that "Amruthaanjan is highly fictional, deliberately illogical, and unapologetically exaggerated. It does not aim for realism or depth; instead, it leans fully into playful storytelling and sketch-based humour." A. Sharadhaa of The New Indian Express said that"Amruthaanjan's humour, lightly applied, is instantly effective and never meant to linger. In a crux, Amruthaanjan, like its YouTube shorts, provides some relief, brings a laugh, and moves on. And maybe that's the point: sometimes, relief is all you need."
