= Naanu Karunakara =

2026 Indian Kannada language film

- Poster
- Directed by: Aryan Tejas
- Written by: Aryan Tejas
- Produced by: Naman Narayan Santhosh; Vaibhav Suresh
- Starring: Aryan Tejas; Radha Bhagavati
- Cinematography: Vijay Ram
- Edited by: Suhas N
- Music by: Rohit Sower
- Production company: Nam Popcorn Cinema
- Release date: 2 April 2026
- Country: India
- Language: Kannada

Naanu Karunakara (transl. Me, Karunakara) is a 2026 Indian Kannada language film directed by Aryan Tejas. The film stars Aryan Tejas, and Radha Bhagavati in the lead roles.

== Cast ==
- Aryan Tejas as Karunakara
- Radha Bhagavati as Mamata
- Bhavish Gowda as Appu
- M. K. Mutton
- Karikaada Subbu
- Apoorva Shri
- B M Venkatesh
- Lokesh Comedy Khiladigalu

== Reception ==
Susmita Sameera of The Times of India said that "Naanu Karunakara is a simple family drama driven by emotion, warmth, and relatable struggles. Though it has its flaws, the film ultimately leaves the audience with a sense of satisfaction and empathy. For viewers looking for a heartfelt story about family, this film is worth watching." A. Sharadhaa of The New Indian Express said that "Naanu Karunakara remains a modest, emotion-driven film. What lasts is the ache of timing, small dreams, and a life where, by the time you can afford something, the need for it has already passed. It is a simple story, told with honesty." Y. Maheswara Reddy of the Bangalore Mirror said that "The film is a honest attempt to portray the everyday life and challenges of a middle-class family. It is a good watch for viewers who enjoy simple family dramas."
