= Bharathi Teacher =

2026 Indian Kannada language film

- Theatrical release poster
- Directed by: M.L. Prasanna
- Written by: M.L. Prasanna
- Produced by: Raghavendra Reddy P.
- Starring: Rohith Raghavendra; Yashika Chaira; Sihi Kahi Chandru
- Cinematography: M.B. Allikatti
- Edited by: Sujith Nayak
- Music by: M.L. Prasanna
- Production company: Poojyaya Films
- Release date: 16 January 2026
- Running time: 139 minutes
- Country: India
- Language: Kannada

Bharathi Teacher is a 2026 Indian Kannada-language film directed by M.L. Prasanna. The film stars Rohith Raghavendra, Yashika Chaira and Sihi Kahi Chandru in the lead role.

== Plot ==
Bharathi is a bright seventh-grade girl from a small village, raised by her mother in the absence of a father. Inspired by her teacher's dream of uplifting their community, she makes it her mission to educate the villagers in their native Kannada. Her journey is a testament to resilience as she overcomes obstacles to bring change through education, highlighting social responsibility and a deep love for one's mother tongue.

== Cast ==
- Rohith Raghavendra as Rajashekara
- Yashika Chaira as Bharathi
- Sihi Kahi Chandru as Teacher
- Divya Anchan as Neela
- Benaka Nanjappa as Ajjayya
- Govinde Gowda as Kampa
- Ashwin Hassan as Police Inspector
- Rangaswamy M. Gowdru
- Soujanya Sunil as Jayakka

== Reception ==
Susmita Sameera of The Times of India said that "Bharathi Teacher is driven by a noble intention and finds its emotional strength in moments that highlight mentorship and grassroots education. However, the film's scattered screenplay and lack of narrative cohesion prevent these ideas from unfolding with the depth they deserve. Adding to this, the performances often feel overly dramatic and staged, reducing the sense of realism the story calls for. As a result, the film remains sincere in purpose but falls short." A. Sharadhaa of The New Indian Express said that"If Bharathi Teacher, 7th Standard sometimes opts to state its message explicitly rather than allowing conflict to fully convey it, that reflects its sincerity. It may feel like a story being told instead of a world being lived in, but within that framework lies a quietly bold idea: social responsibility does not start after graduation, success, or permission. Sometimes it begins in a school uniform with a question that no adult seems brave enough to ask." Y. Maheswara Reddy of Bangalore Mirror said that "Cinematographer MB Hallikatti has done an excellent job behind the camera by capturing the beauty and the greenery of rural areas in Mandya district. The movie has around 10 songs and the lyrics are penned by director Prasanna himself."
