= Mathe Male Hoyyuthide =

2026 Indian Kannada language film

- Poster
- Directed by: Param Gubbi
- Produced by: Suma G
- Starring: Likhit Gowda; Bhumika Gowda
- Music by: Athishay Jain
- Production company: Sri Gaviranganatha Swami Pictures
- Release date: 8 May 2026
- Country: India
- Language: Kannada

Mathe Male Hoyyuthide is a 2026 Indian Kannada language film directed by Param Gubbi. The film stars Likhit Gowda, and Bhumika Gowda in the lead role.

== Cast ==
- Likhit Gowda
- Bhumika Gowda

== Reception ==
Susmita Sameera of The Times of India said that "Despite these flaws, the writing and emotional core manage to hold attention, particularly in the second half. Their heartfelt conversations bring out the film's bittersweet emotion effectively, leaving behind a gentle emotional impact." Y. Maheswara Reddy of the Bangalore Mirror said that "The film offers a visual treat with its scenic backdrop but lacks depth and character development." A. Sharadhaa of the Cinema Express said that "Mathe Male Hoyyuttide is not a perfect film, but it understands how love never fully leaves people. Somewhere, beneath its uneven storytelling, the film still understands the soul of the short story it comes from."
