= Manga Maaya =

2026 Indian Kannada language film

- Poster
- Directed by: Prasad Puttur
- Written by: Prasad Puttur
- Produced by: Puttur Brothers
- Starring: Radhesh Shenoy; Prakash Shenoy
- Cinematography: Vishnu Prasad P
- Edited by: CK Kumar
- Music by: Nishan Rai
- Production company: Puttur Brothers Entertainment
- Release date: 8 May 2026
- Country: India
- Language: Kannada

Manga Maaya is a 2026 Indian Kannada language film written and directed by Prasad Puttur. The film stars Radhesh Shenoy, Prakash Shenoy, and Prasanna Puttur in the lead role.

== Cast ==
- Radhesh Shenoy as Manja
- Prakash Shenoy as Murthy
- Prasanna Puttur
- Mohammad Haneef Hootagalli
- Ranjan Shetty
- Akshath Amin as Pawan
- Chandan Kumar as Vijay
- Vijayalakshmi M

== Reception ==
Susmita Sameera of The Times of India said that "Technically, the film remains decent and stays consistent with its grounded storytelling approach. What begins as an intriguing mystery gradually loses its grip, and the film is unable to sustain the tension and engagement it initially promises." A. Sharadhaa of the Cinema Express said that "Imperfect, rough-edged, and visibly constrained by budget, Manga Maaya still understands something many larger thrillers forget: atmosphere itself can become suspense." Y. Maheswara Reddy of the Bangalore Mirror said that "Ranjan Shetty has done justice to the role assigned to him. All in all, the movie is worth a watch for those who enjoy suspense thrillers."
