= Boys Never Compromise =

2026 Indian Kannada language film

- Poster
- Directed by: Harish R Jalgere
- Written by: Chikkaswamy DR (dialogues)
- Produced by: Ujwala Nagaraja Rao Jagdale
- Starring: Samraat Parikshith; Suprith Kaati
- Cinematography: Pramod Bharatiya
- Music by: Lokii Tavasya (songs); Thyagaraja MS (score)
- Production company: Marigold Studios
- Release date: 10 July 2026
- Country: India
- Language: Kannada

Boys Never Compromise is a 2026 Indian Kannada language film directed by Harish R Jalgere. The film stars Samraat Parikshith, and Suprith Kaati in lead role.

== Cast ==
- Samraat Parikshith as Dragon Doggy
- Suprith Kaati as Whitey
- Seetharam as Shining
- Mandya Siddu as Kabab
- Umesh Kinnal as Bolt
- Gajendra Marasanige as Maggie
- Raja Raja Chola as Nathu

== Reception ==
Susmita Sameera in The Times of India said that "The film ultimately relies on familiar road-trip tropes and humour that rarely rises above its predictable template. Viewers seeking a more inventive or well-crafted horror-comedy are unlikely to find much to appreciate here. However, if you enjoy unabashedly adult-oriented road-trip comedies with supernatural elements, you may consider giving it a try." A. Sharadhaa of the Cinema Express said that "Beyond the scares and the laughs, Boys Never Compromise leaves its audience with a simple thought: compromise is always a choice. Like its protagonists, Boys Never Compromise stumbles, laughs, and keeps moving, making for an entertaining, if uneven, horror-comedy." Y. Maheswara Reddy of the Bangalore Mirror said that "They get into the skin of their characters. The background score by Thyagaraj MS is very good. The movie is worth watching for those who crave horror movies."
