= Nam Kaaldal Hingirlilla Bidi =

2026 Indian Kannada language film

- Poster
- Directed by: SS Amoghavars
- Starring: SS Amoghavars; Rithiya Gowda
- Release date: 3 July 2026
- Country: India
- Language: Kannada

Nam Kaaldal Hingirlilla Bidi is a 2026 Indian Kannada language film directed SS Amoghavars. The film stars SS Amoghavars, Rithiya Gowda in the lead role.

== Cast ==
- SS Amoghavars
- Rithiya Gowda
- Raghu Ramanakoppa
- Yashwant MK
- MC Theirtha
- Chandramouli Prabhu
- Akshay Prabhakar
- Hari Dhananjaya

== Reception ==
A. Sharadhaa of the Cinema Express said that "Nam Kaaldal Hingirlilla Bidi isn't polished filmmaking. It is rough around the edges and sometimes too eager to make its point. The film doesn't fully achieve the potential of its premise, yet its emotional honesty keeps it from being easily forgotten" Susmita Sameera of The Times of India said that "Nam Kaaldal Hingirlilla Bidi attempts to explore themes of abandonment, mental health, and the lasting impact of parents' decisions on their children. However, uneven writing, inconsistent tonal shifts, unnecessary diversions, and weak technical execution result in a film that never develops into a compelling emotional drama." Y. Maheswara Reddy of the Bangalore Mirror said that "Amoghavarsha has made a sincere effort to showcase his acting skills, but he still has a long way to go before becoming a popular Sandalwood actor. Overall, the movie may be worth watching only if you have no better way to spend your leisure time."
