= Nenapugala Maathu Madhura =

2026 Indian Kannada language film

- Poster
- Directed by: Mohamed Abzal
- Starring: Mohamed Abzal; Seven Raj
- Release date: 6 February 2026
- Country: India
- Language: Kannada

Nenapugala Maathu Madhura is a 2026 Indian Kannada language film directed by Mohamed Abzal. The film stars Mohamed Abzal, Seven Raj, Ranveer K in the lead role.

== Cast ==
- Mohamed Abzal
- Seven Raj
- Ranveer K
- Rajprabhu M

== Reception ==
Susmita Sameera of The Times of India said that "Performances across the board are weak, with actors struggling to deliver dialogue naturally. The technical aspects offer no support for the narrative, and the overall presentation feels careless and amateurish. Nenapugala Maatu Madhura fails to offer insight, entertainment, or artistic value, and stands as a film best avoided." Y. Maheswara Reddy of the Bangalore Mirror said that "The film seems to portray all men and women do is roam around or make out. The movie has one horror scene where the departed soul appears and rides a scooter and invites a stranger to spend time with him. It is worth a watch for those who have no other options to kill time."
