= Thapaswini Poonacha =

Indian actress

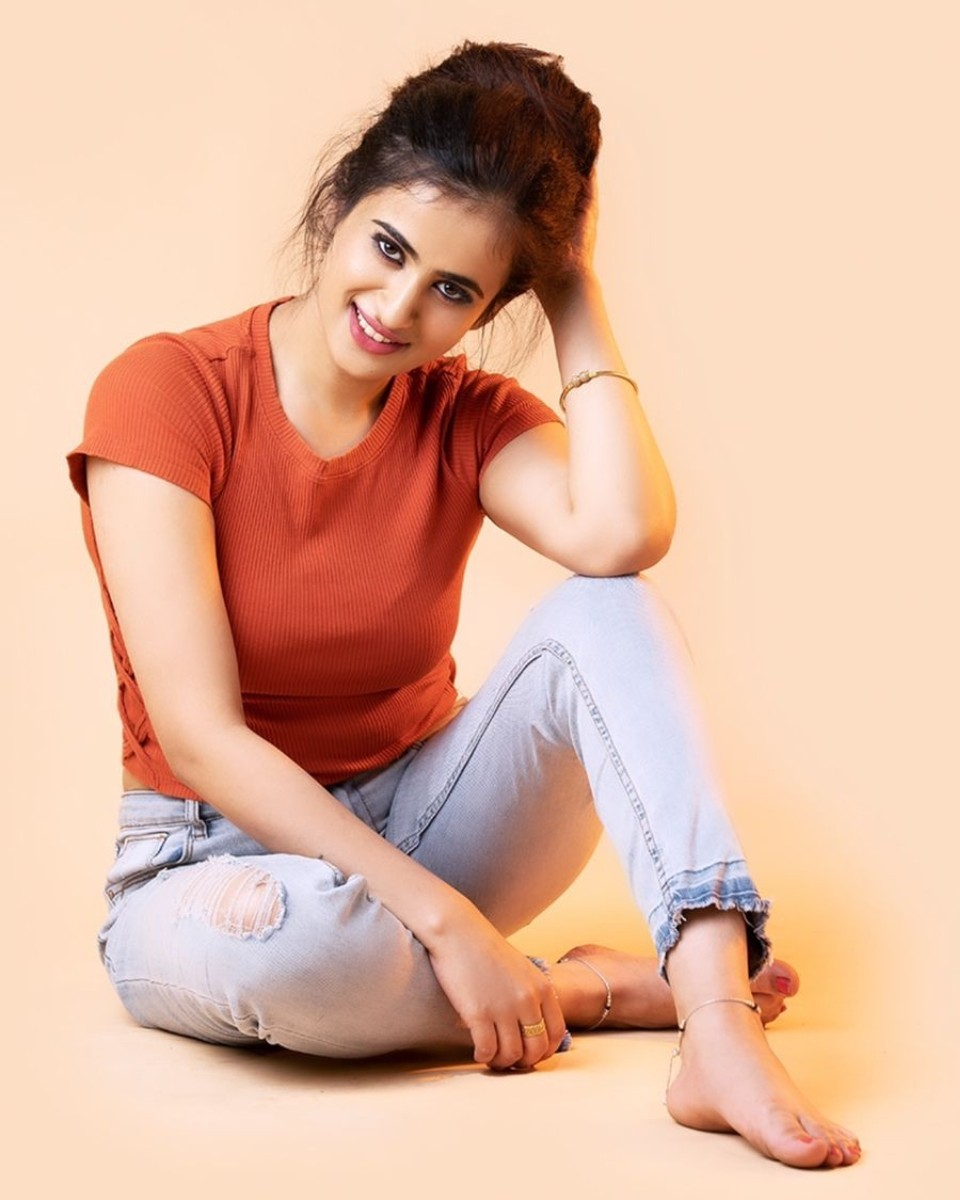
- Born: Virajpete, Kodagu, Karnataka, India
- Occupation: Actress
- Years active: 2022–present

Thapaswini Poonacha is an Indian Kannada actress. She is known for her roles in the Kannada films Hari Kathe Alla Giri Kathe (2022) and Gajarama (2025).

== Career ==
She is younger sister of Harshika Poonacha.

Thapaswini Poonacha made her acting debut in 2022 with the Kannada film Hari Kathe Alla Giri Kathe, where she starred opposite Rishab Shetty. A mixed review of the film in Cinema Express found that "Thapaswini’s role [was] the soul of the film, and it also aid[ed] in bringing out the romantic side of Giri [the character played by Shetty]".

Her second film, Gajarama was released on 7 February 2025; Thapaswini played the character of Anjali, the female lead role.

In 2025, The New Indian Express reported that Thapaswini Poonacha had signed for a lead role in a new project Mr. Jack, starring Gurunandan. The same year she stated in an interview that she was also part of another project "Rukmini Vasantha, which star[red] Shri and Rangayana Raghu in key roles".

== Awards and recognition ==
- Chittara Promising Star Award: for her promising role in the Kannada film industry.

== Filmography ==
Year	Film	Role	Notes
2022	Hari Kathe Alla Giri Kathe	Kushi	Debut film
2025	Gajarama	Anjali	
2026	Premada Oorali	Rukmini	
TBA	Mr. Jack	Nandini	Filming
