= Rachana Inder =

Indian Kannada actress

- Born: 6th March, 1999; Bengaluru, Karnataka, India
- Education: St. Vincent Pallotti School; St Claret College
- Occupation: Actress
- Years active: 2020–present
- Parents: Indu Kumar (father); Babitha Thimmiah (mother)

Rachana Inder is an Indian actress who works mainly in Kannada film industry in addition to a few Telugu Films. She debuted as a supporting actress in the film Love Mocktail.

== Career ==
=== Early life and Debut as Supporting Actor ===
Rachana was born to Indu Kumar and Babitha Thimmiah in Bengaluru, Karnataka. She hails from the Arebhashe Kannada speaking Kodagu Gowda community. She completed her MBA in Bengaluru from St. Claret College. She started her career in the Industry as a Freelance Model. Her acting debut in the 2020 Kannada movie Love Mocktail directed by Krishna. The Movie opened to critical acclaim with commercial success and her character was received well with its quirky humorous dialogues. She then appeared in a cameo in the sequel Love Mocktail 2. Her next was with Rishab Shetty in Harikathe Alla Girikathe in which she played Girija Thomas a Character Artist, the movie opened to positive to mixed reviews and was a decent hit at the box office.

=== Debut as Main Lead and Onwards ===
Rachana made her Main lead debut in the Love 360 directed by Shashank which opened to positive reviews and was a commercially successful outing. She then appeared alongside Ganesh, Aditi Prabhudeva and Megha Shetty in Triple riding which opened to mixed reviews. She made her Telugu debut through Chittam Maharani opposite to Yazurved directed by Akula Kasi Viswanath which opened to mixed reviews but her character was praised.

== Filmography ==
Key
†	Denotes films that have not yet been released

- All films are in Kannada, unless otherwise noted.

Year	Film	Role	Note	Ref.
2020	Love Mocktail	Aditi	Supporting Role	
2022	Love Mocktail 2	Aditi	Cameo appearance	
2022	Harikathe Alla Girikathe	Girija Thomas	Supporting Role	
2022	Love 360	Janaki "Jaanu"	Debut as Main lead	
2022	Triple Riding	Radhika		
2022	Chittam Maharani	Chaitra	Telugu film	
2024	Naalkane Aayama	Mansi		
2024	4N6	Nayesha		
2024	Not Out	Sridevi		
2025	Firefly	Neha		
2025	Naanu Matthu Gunda 2	Indu		
2026	Theertharoopa Thandeyavarige	Akshara		
2026	Spark			
