= Shree Raam =

Indian film actor

- Born: Naveen Mahadev; 8 September 1989 (age 37); Bangalore, Karnataka, India
- Occupation: Actor

Shree Raam, previously known as Shri Mahadev or Shree, born Naveen Mahadev is an Indian film actor, who works predominantly in Kannada film industry. He is known for his performance in Iruvudellava Bittu, Hondisi Bareyiri and 2026 film Premada Oorali.

== Filmography ==
=== Films ===
Year	Film	Role	Notes
2018	Iruvudellava Bittu	Aakash	Debut film
2021	Kotigobba 3	Satya's friend	Cameo appearance
2022	Gajanana And Gang	Gajendra (Gaja)	
2023	Hondisi Bareyiri	Kumar	
2026	Premada Oorali	Santhu	Lead role

=== Short films ===
Year	Film	Role	Notes
2017	Rishabhapriya	Rishabh	
2022	Sangama Samagama	Shravan	

=== Television ===
Year	Title	Role	Channel	Notes
2013-2015	Chitte Hejje		ETV Kannada / Colors Kannada	
2016	Shrirasthu Shubhamasthu	SriNidhi "Sri"	Zee Kannada	Lead Role
2016-18	Neeli	Vishnu	Suvarna TV	Lead Role
2018	Avalum Naanum (Tamil)	Vijay Ravishankar	Star Vijay	Cameo Appearance
2019-2020	Ishtadevathe	Sriram	Colors Kannada	Lead Role
2021	Kanyakumari	Arjun	Colors Kannada	Cameo Appearance
