= Theertharoopa Thandeyavarige =

- Theatrical release poster
- Directed by: Ramenahalli Jagannath
- Written by: Ramenahalli Jagannath
- Produced by: Jai Chamundeshwari Productions
- Starring: Nihar Mukesh; Rachana Inder; Sithara; Rajesh Nataranga; Ravindra Vijay
- Cinematography: Deepak Yaragera
- Edited by: Suresh Armugam
- Music by: Joe Costa
- Production company: Jai Chamundeshwari Productions
- Distributed by: Janani Pictures
- Release date: 1 January 2026
- Country: India
- Language: Kannada
- Budget: ₹2.08 crore
- Box office: ₹5.32 crore

Theertharoopa Thandeyavarige (transl. To the beloved father) is a 2026 Indian Kannada‑language family drama film written and directed by Ramenahalli Jagannatha and produced under the Jai Chamundeshwari Productions banner. It stars debutant Nihar Mukesh, and Rachana Inder in the lead, alongside Sithara, Rajesh Nataranga, Ravindra Vijay, Ajith Hande, and Ashwitha R. Hegde in supporting roles. Joe Costa composed the music, Deepaka Yaregara served as director of photography, and Suresh Arumugam handled editing.

The official trailer was released on December 6, 2025 via Anand Audio’s YouTube channel. The film was theatrically released in India on January 1, 2026 and runs 149 minutes.

== Plot ==
Pruthvi, a popular travel vlogger, harbors resentment toward his single mother Janaki and keeps his distance from home. As he grows close to Akshara, the daughter of a senior journalist, a chain of revelations forces him to confront the past—particularly the disappearance and public stature of his estranged father. The film traces Pruthvi’s search and the emotional reconciliation that follows, exploring friendships outside conventional labels, class divides within relationships, and the healing of fractured family bonds.

== Cast ==
- Nihar Mukesh as Pruthvi, a travel vlogger
- Rachana Inder as Akshara
- Rajesh Nataranga as Vishwanath
- Sithara as Janaki
- Ravindra Vijay as Prof. Shivshankar
- Ajith Hande as Ravi Ramanathapura, retired journalist
- Ashwitha R. Hegde as Ramya
- Girish Shivanna as Ashokanna, tea shop
- Gopan Mangath
- Swetanshu Bora
- Vijayalakshmi Upadhyaya
- Siddharth Krishnan
- Natana Prashanth
- Medini Kelamane
- Arya Swaroop
- Srivathsa
- Yogesh Bhonsle
- Deepak Hegde

== Production ==
=== Development ===
Following his 2023 debut Hondisi Bareyiri, director Ramenahalli Jagannatha pursued another slice‑of‑life/family‑values story centered on relationships and emotional healing. Pre‑release interviews emphasized a New Year’s Day launch and the film’s focus on how a single mistake can shake a family before it finds a way back together.

The filming took place across multiple regions, with sequences set in or traveling through Moodigere, Mysuru, Kochi, Meghalaya, and the United States.

=== Marketing ===
The official trailer premiered on December 6, 2025 on the Anand Audio channel, highlighting the film’s family‑drama premise, Joe Costa’s score, and credits for the core crew. Promotional coverage in Kannada media reinforced the January 1 release plan and the film’s positioning as a family‑audience title to start 2026.

== Music ==
Joe Costa composed the soundtrack and background score. The lyrics were written by Nagarjuna Sharma, and Ramenahalli Jagannatha.

Track listing
No.	Title	Lyrics	Singer(s)	Length
1.	"Nanade Jagadalli"	Ramenahalli Jagannatha	Kapil Kapilan	3:47
2.	"Nee Nannavale"	Nagarjun Sharma	Rajath Hegde, Eesha Suchi	3:05

== Release and reception ==
The film was released theatrically in India on January 1, 2026, with a reported runtime of 149 minutes.

Early critical response in English and Kannada media has been mixed‑to‑positive: The Hindu praised the film’s relatable slice‑of‑life approach, strong performances (particularly Ravindra Vijay and Sithara), and authentic character interactions, noting some pacing issues and a few over‑extended sequences. India Today called it “a truly emotional and engaging family drama,” lauding the balance of emotions and the delicately handled budding romance, while pointing out gaps in the screenplay and unresolved elements.

Kannada outlets such as TV9 Kannada, Eedina, and Prajavani highlighted the film’s emotional core, performances of the senior cast, and Joe Costa’s background score and Deepaka Yaregara’s cinematography; criticisms centered on screenplay trims, certain logical leaps, and portions perceived as overlong.
