= Neethu Vanajakshi =

Trans woman from Karnataka

Neethu Vanajakshi (born 25 February 1993) is an Indian actress from Karnataka. She was a contestant on season 10 of Bigg Boss Kannada, and was eliminated from the show after seven weeks.

== Early life ==
Vanajakshi hails from Gadag district, Karnataka. She did her schooling at Model High School. She used to make and sell flower garlands to add to the income of the family. In 2007, she moved to Bengaluru to join a college and to explore her identity. She studied art at the Ken School of Art, Bengaluru after competing her BBA degree and also did a diploma in animation. She is an amateur semi-classical Kathak dancer, a yoga practitioner and a tattoo artist. She used to run a hotel that served traditional North Karnataka food.

== Identity ==
Vanajakshi is a trans woman. She took counseling and hormonal therapy in preparation for her transition to a trans woman and underwent surgery and medical treatment. In 2019, she won Miss Transqueen title and earned the chance to represent India. She revealed her identity in 2016 to her sister, who was in shocked and in tears to hear her sister's story. In 2020, she represented India at the Miss International Queen 2020. In Big Boss, she shared her feelings and how she had to keep her identity a secret before she came out.

== Career ==
Vanajakshi began as flower seller in her village to support her family before becoming a full-fledged entrepreneur, dancer, tattoo artist and actor. After leaving her home town Gadag, she started a restaurant, Gama Gama, for her mother and a beauty parlour for her sister, to fulfill her 'responsibility towards her family'. After becoming popular through the reality show Super Queens, she made her debut in acting in the film UI directed by director Upendra. In the reality show Bigg Boss Kannada 10, she achieved two milestones, the captaincy of the house and 'Kicchana Chappale', the appreciation of actor Kiccha Sudeep, who is the host. She is also a TEDx speaker.
