= Mon Mane Na (TV series) =

Indian Bengali television series

- Genre: Drama; Romance; Politics
- Written by: Camellia Banerjee, Tapan Ganguly
- Directed by: Premendu Bikash Chaki; Amit Sengupta
- Creative director: Nairwita Dutta
- Starring: Pallavi Dey; Samm Batyacharyya; Anjana Basu
- Music by: Jit Ganguly; Devjit Roy
- Opening theme: Mon Mane Na by Nikita Gandhi and Sashwat Singh
- Country of origin: India
- Original language: Bengali
- No. of seasons: 1
- No. of episodes: 279

Production
- Executive producers: Ankita Mitra; Arghya Mukherjee
- Producers: Surinder Singh; Nispal Singh
- Production locations: Technicians' Studio, Kolkata
- Editor: Krishnendu Ghosh
- Camera setup: Multi-camera
- Running time: 20-22 minutes
- Production company: Surinder Films

Original release
- Network: Colors Bangla
- Release: 30 August 2021 – 5 June 2022

Mon Mane Na is an Indian Bengali drama television series which premiered on 30 August 2021 on Colors Bangla and digital platform Voot. It stars Pallavi Dey, Samm Batyacharyya, and Anjana Basu. The show is produced by Surinder Films. It ended on 5 June 2022. This show was ended abruptly with an incomplete story due to the unexpected death of the lead actress. During the time span of this show, Pallavi Dey committed suicide and was declared dead on 15 May 2022 and for that, the makers showed the death of Pallavi's onscreen character Gouri and ended on a sat note.

== Plot ==
A rustic love story of Gauri and Rudra, two lovers caught in Boro Ma and Shardul Gonshai's political powerplay. Based in Akandapur, rural Bengal, this is an action-packed story of romance and how love triumphs all. Their lives go into major obstacles, but they fight together to beat it. However, their lives changed after the sudden death of Gauri, and the truth about Rudra's parentage. At the end, Rudra and Boro Ma has caught the persons involved at Gauri's murder. After accomplishing all the tasks to find Gauri's murderers, Boro Ma leaves Akandapur to find Kaberi, but before Boro Ma leaves for good, Rudra accepts Boro Ma as his mother, and they remember Gauri.

== Cast ==
=== Main ===
- Pallavi Dey as Gauri Burman (née Bhattacharya) – Girish and Maya's daughter; Baban's sister; Rudra's wife; Boro Ma's former rival (2021-2022) (Dead)
- Sam Bhattacharya as Rudra Burman – A dreadful crime boss of Akandapur turned politician and elected MLA; Boro Ma's elder son and former right hand; Suryakanta and Kaberi's adopted son; Lokesh's brother; Tuktuki's adopted brother; Gauri's widower (2021-2022)
- Anjana Basu as Rajani Singha Roy (née Mishra) aka Baroma – A politician, former major MLA in Akandpur; Sashadhar's sister; Suryanata and Kaberi's friend; Rudra and Lokesh's mother; Gauri's former rival (2021-2022)

=== Recurring ===
- Bharat Kaul as Suryakanta Burman – Chandrakanta's brother; Kaberi's husband; Tuktuki's father; Rudra's adoptive father; Boro Ma's friend (2021-2022)
- Suchismita Chowdhury as Kaberi Burman – Suryakanta's wife; Tuktuki's mother; Rudra's adoptive mother; Boro Ma's friend (2021-2022)
- Shakshi Roy as Shiuli Burman aka Tuktuki – Suryakanta and Kaberi's daughter; Rudra's adopted sister; Ritesh's fiancée (2021-2022)
- Atmadeep Ghosh as Ritesh Roy – Head police at Akandpur; Tuktuki's fiancé (2022)
- Arnab Banerjee as Chandrakanta Burman – Suryakanta's brother; Sulekha's husband (2021-2022)
- Jayasree Mukherjee as Sulekha Burman – Chandrakanta's wife (2021–2022)
- Joyjit Banerjee as Shardul Goshai – Bora Ma's arch rival, Rudra's former rival later boss, Gauri's brother figure (2021–2022)
- Arunava Dutta as Montu Pyne – Shardul's friend and assistant; Boro Ma's assistant turned rival (2021–2022)
- Tapan Ganguly as Sasadhar Mishra – Baroma's brother and chairman of party; Rudra's maternal uncle and rival, Conspirator of Gauri's killing (2021–2022)
- Shaktipada Dey as Mozaffar Hossain - Vice Chairman of Baroma's party (2021-2022)
- Anamitra Batabyal as Lokesh Singha Roy – Baroma's younger son; Rudra's brother and rival; Gauri's killer (2021–2022)
- Bimal Chakraborty as Girish Bhattacharya – Maya's husband; Gauri and Baban's father (2021-2022)
- Nabonita Dey as Maya Bhattacharya – Girish's wife; Gauri and Baban's mother (2021-2022)
- Debomoy Mukherjee as Soumen Bhattacharya aka Baban – Girish and Maya's son; Gauri's brother (2021–2022)
- Prasanta Sutrandhar as Bhola – Rudra and Nandu's close friend (2021–2022)
- Amritendu Kar as Nandu – Rudra and Bhola's close friend (2021-2022)
- Anindya Sarkar as I.C Gupta - SP of Akandapur (2021-2022)
- Rajkumar Dutta as R.K Purkait - Former OC of Akandapur (2021–2022)
- Devojit Mukherjee as Gaurav Chatterjee – Gauri's ex-fiancé (2021) (Dead)
- Sampriti Poddar as
  - Hiya – Rudra's former love interest (2021)
  - Jhilmil – Hiya's lookalike; Boro Ma's ally (2021–2022)
- Anindya Banerjee as Bidhan Poddar – Sasadhar's party worker; Baroma's former assistant and later rival (2022)
- Saheli Banerjee as Payel Samajpoti – Gouri's close friend (2021, 2022)
- Subhajit Banerjee as Advocate Jaiswal - Boro Ma's lawyer (2021, 2022)
- Paayel Dutta as Maitrayee Mitra aka Mithu - Maya's sister, Gauri's aunt.
- Subhrajit Adgiri as Tapas - Gauri's former friend.
- Riju Dutta as Ranojit - Gauri's friend.
- Deep Dutta as Bhava - Rudra's aid.
- Sangita Ghosh as Mimi - Gauri's friend.
- Drishti Mondal as Pallavi - Gauri's friend.
- Kuyasha Biswas as Priyadarshini Bala Mishra
- Moumita Chakrabarty as Ritesh's mother

== Production ==
=== Release ===
The team started shooting for the series in early July 2022, with the first promo starring the two leads (Pallavi and Samm) released in late July. Another promo was released introducing Anjana's character "Boro Ma" included with the two leads (Pallavi and Samm) days later with the release date being shown.

=== Casting ===
Pallavi Dey was cast as the female lead in early June 2021, days after her last show, Saraswatir Prem, ended. Samm Batyacharyya was cast as the male lead and Anjana Basu as the third lead. Then, the ensemble casts, which are Bharat Kaul, Suchismita Chowdhury, Shakshi Roy, Arnab Banerjee, and Jayasree Mukherjee were finalized as the Burman Family (Rudra's family). Meanwhile, the second ensemble casts, which are Bimal Chakraborty, Nabonita Dey, and Debomoy Mukherjee were finalized as the Chatterjee Family (Gauri's family before the marriage). They are followed by Saheli Banerjee, Joyjit Banerjee, Arunava Dutta, Anamitra Batabyal, Prasanta Sutradhar, and Amritendu Kar as recurring members of the show, essaying the roles of Payel, Shardul, Montu, Lokesh, Bhola, and Nandu, respectively.

In late July 2021, Devojit Mukherjee was cast as Gaurav, but exited just weeks after the show started and his character was killed. In December 2021, Atmadeep Ghosh was cast as Ritesh, Akandapur's chief police and ally of Boro Ma, who fell in love with Tuktuki, Rudra's sister. In January 2022, Sampriti Poddar was cast as Hiya, Rudra's former girlfriend who they thought had died, and she exited the show by February. In February 2022, the second ensemble cast (Chatterjee Family) consisting of Bimal Chakraborty, Nabonita Dey, and Debomoy Mukherjee exited the show. In March 2022, Anamitra Batabyal, who is essaying the role of Lokesh, took a break from the series, and was shown as shot by Boro Ma and is presumed dead. He came back in May 2022 and stayed until the end of the show.

=== Cancellation ===
Prior to the timeslot change, Mon Mane Na is airing at 7:30PM. But owing to low ratings, the show was moved to 9:00PM in May 2022 to give way for a new show, Tumpa Autowali.

On 15 May 2022, the female protagonist, Pallavi Dey died due to suicide, hence leaving her role vacant for 2 days until makers has decided to kill off her character (Gauri).

Before the death of Pallavi, the show's track is about Gauri knowing the real parents of Rudra, and a promo was released in 14 May, a day before her death. But, after the tragedy, the makers edited their storyline to focus on Rudra's quest to find Gauri's killers and his real parents.

The producers decided not to extend the show as there will be no essence on the show if one of the leads are missing. They wrapped up their shoot on 20 May 2022 and the show ended on 5 June 2022. During the last episode, a tribute to Pallavi was broadcast at the end and was also posted in Colors Bangla's Instagram. The show was replaced by Tumii Je Amar Maa the following day, 6 June.

=== Location ===
Based on a fictional location of Akandapur, West Bengal as backdrop, Mon Mane Na was mainly filmed at Technicians' Studio located in Kolkata. The first promo was shot in the banks of Hooghly River, also located in West Bengal.

== Adaptations ==
Language	Title	Original release	Network(s)	Last aired	Notes
Marathi	Jeev Zala Yedapisa जीव झाला येडापिसा	1 April 2019	Colors Marathi	3 April 2021	Original
Tamil	Idhayathai Thirudathe இதயத்தை திருடாதே	14 February 2020	Colors Tamil	3 June 2022	Remake
Kannada	Ginirama ಗಿಣಿರಾಮ	17 August 2020	Colors Kannada	17 June 2023	Remake
Hindi	Bawara Dil बावरा दिल	22 February 2021	Colors TV	20 August 2021	Remake
Bengali	Mon Mane Na মন মানে না	30 August 2021	Colors Bangla	5 June 2022	Remake
