= Filmfare Critics Award for Best Actress – Kannada =

Indian annual film award

- Awarded for: Best performance by an actress in Kannada films
- Country: India
- Presented by: Filmfare
- First award: 2015
- Currently held by: Ankita Amar for Ibbani Tabbida Ileyali (2024)

The Filmfare Critics Award for Best Actress – Kannada is given by Filmfare as part of its annual Filmfare Awards South for Kannada films. The award is given by a chosen jury of critics.

== Winners ==
| Year | Actress | Role | Film | Ref. |
|---|---|---|---|---|
| 2015 | Rachita Ram | Rukmini | Ranna | |
| 2016 | Sruthi Hariharan | Dr. Sahana | Godhi Banna Sadharana Mykattu | |
| 2017 | Shraddha Srinath | Ananya | Operation Alamelamma | |
| 2018 | Sruthi Hariharan | Gowri | Nathicharami | |
| 2019 | AWARDS FUNCTION WAS SUSPENDED DUE TO COVID-19 PANDEMIC | | | |
| 2020 2021 | Milana Nagaraj | Nidhima "Nidhi" | Love Mocktail | |
| 2020 2021 | Amrutha Iyengar | Sangeetha | Badava Rascal | |
| 2022 | Sapthami Gowda | Leela | Kantara | |
| 2023 | Rukmini Vasanth | Priya | Sapta Saagaradaache Ello | |
| 2024 | Ankita Amar | Anahita Madhumita Banarjee | Ibbani Tabbida Ileyali | |

== Superlatives ==
| Superlative | Actress | Record |
|---|---|---|
| Most wins | Sruthi Hariharan | 2 wins |

== See also ==
- Filmfare Critics Award for Best Actor – Kannada
