= My Hero (2024 film) =

2024 Indian drama film

- Theatrical release poster
- Directed by: Avinash Vijaykumar
- Written by: Avinash Vijaykumar
- Produced by: Avinash Vijaykumar
- Starring: Djilali Rez Kallah; Master Vedic Kushal; H. G. Dattatreya; Prakash Belawadi; Ankita Amar; Eric Roberts
- Cinematography: India: Venus Nagaraj Murthy; United States: Forrest Chiras; Akula Lokesh Babu
- Edited by: Muthu Raj T
- Music by: Songs: Gagan Baderiya; Rusty Tinder; V. Manohar; Score: V. Manohar
- Production company: AV Film Studios
- Distributed by: PVR Inox Pictures
- Release date: 30 August 2024
- Running time: 141 minutes
- Country: India
- Language: Kannada

My Hero is a 2024 Indian Kannada-language drama film written and directed by Avinash Vijaykumar in his directorial debut. The film stars Djilali Rez Kallah, Master Vedic Kushal, H. G. Dattatreya, Prakash Belawadi, Ankita Amar, and Eric Roberts.

My Hero was released theatrically on 30 August 2024.

== Plot summary ==
My Hero follows the emotional journey of a family coping with the challenges of memory loss caused by Alzheimer’s. Set against the backdrop of rarely explored locations in Madhya Pradesh, the film blends local and international perspectives to highlight themes of love, resilience, and social inequality. Told partly through the eyes of a young boy who has endured discrimination, the story emphasizes hope, faith, and the strength of human bonds. More than a film about illness, My Hero is a tribute to the human spirit and the enduring connections that help families face adversity together.

== Cast ==
- Djilali Rez Kallah as Gary
- Master Vedic Kushal as Vishwa
- H. G. Dattatreya
- Prakash Belawadi
- Ankita Amar
- Eric Roberts
- James Gioia
- Niranjan Deshpande
- Tanuja Krishnappa
- Kshitij Pawar

== Production ==
The script for the film was written by Avinash Vijaykumar, who drew inspiration from two real-life incidents. One incident occurred in a village in North Karnataka, where an oppressed community boy's hand was severed after he attempted to touch an idol during a religious procession. Another incident involved Sylvester Stallone's visit to Varanasi for a Hindu Tithi Shradh ritual in memory of his son, who died in 2012. These two incidents were incorporated into a single narrative. Upon finishing the writing, Avinash met Djilali Rez Kallah at an institute, where he was chosen to portray the role of a retired Army officer. Eric Roberts was selected for a key role in the film, and his portions were filmed at his residence in Los Angeles. Nammane Yuvarani fame Ankita Amar was chosen to play an NGO worker from Madhya Pradesh. Principal photography for the film began on 24 February 2023 with muhurat shot pooja held in Basavanagudi. Major portions of the filming took place in Maheshwar. A few portions were shot in Chikmagalur and the United States. The filming was completed within fifty days, including the fifteen days to finish the segments of the United States and thirty-five days for the India portions. Forrest Chiras and Akula Lokesh Babu handled the cinematography for the United States portions, while Venus Nagaraj Murthy handled the cinematography for the India portions. The editing was handled by Muthu Raj T.

== Soundtrack ==
The soundtrack of the film consists of songs composed by Gagan Baderiya, Rusty Tinder, and V. Manohar. The background score was by V. Manohar.

Track listing
No.	Title	Lyrics	Music	Singer(s)	Length
1.	"Chalo Re Chalo Re"	Nilesh Prajapati	Gagan Baderiya	Shubham Roy, Nesz	3:12
2.	"My Hero"	Rusty Tinder	Rusty Tinder	Rusty Tinder	4:15
3.	"Akasha Nagutha Kelide"	Nagarjun Sharma	Gagan Baderiya	Rajat Hegde	3:59
4.	"Kanagile"	V. Manohar	V. Manohar	Bhargav, Abhishek	2:58
Total length:					14:24

== Release ==
The film was initially slated for release on 23 August 2024. However, the release date was subsequently changed, and it was released on 30 August 2024.

== Reception ==
Y. Maheswara Reddy of Bangalore Mirror rated the film three-and-a-half out of five stars, praised the performances of the actors, and wrote that "It is worth a watch for all." Jagadish Angadi of Deccan Herald gave it four out of five stars and wrote, "The filmmaker crafts a compelling story exploring themes of social inequality, faith, and personal loss." A critic from Udayavani gave the film a positive review.

Shashiprasad SM of Times Now gave it three out of five stars and wrote, "My Hero is a standout Kannada film that effectively addresses the persistent evils in society. Told through the perspective of a foreigner and seen through the eyes of a boy who has endured the harshest forms of discrimination, the film delivers a powerful message in a simple yet impactful manner." A Sharadhaa of Cinema Express wrote, "My Hero is a tribute to the human spirit; the film tackles deep-rooted social issues with striking effectiveness." The film also won an award at the New York International Film Awards.
