= Nidradevi Next Door =

2025 Indian romantic drama film

- Theatrical release poster
- Directed by: Suraag Sagar
- Written by: Suraag Sagar
- Produced by: Jayaram Devasamudra
- Starring: Praveer Shetty, Rishika Naik, Shine Shetty, Sruthi Hariharan, Sudha Rani
- Cinematography: Ajay V. Kulkarni
- Music by: Nakul Abhyankar
- Production company: Suram Movies
- Release date: 12 September 2025 (India)
- Running time: 136 minutes
- Country: India
- Language: Kannada

Nidradevi Next Door is a 2025 Indian Kannada-language romantic drama film written and directed by Suraag Sagar. Produced by Jayaram Devasamudra under the Suram Movies banner, the film stars Praveer Shetty, Rishika Naik, Shine Shetty, Sruthi Hariharan and Sudha Rani. The music is composed by Nakul Abhyankar. It was released theatrically on 12 September 2025.

== Premise ==
Dhruva, plagued by chronic insomnia, finds unexpected solace in Riddhima, a mysterious woman whose presence offers fragile peace. Their bond, however, challenges him to choose between emotional refuge and confronting inner fears. The film blends elements of romance, dark humour and psychological drama.

== Cast ==
- Praveer Shetty as Dhruva
- Rishika Naik as Riddhima
- Shine Shetty as Vikram
- Sruthi Hariharan as Shruthi
- Sudha Rani as Sudha
- K. S. Sridhar
- Srivatsa
- Anoop
- Aishwarya Gowda
- Master Sujay Ram
- Karthik Pattar
- Anurag Patil

== Production ==
Director Suraag Sagar collaborated with lead actor Praveer Shetty to shape the character of Dhruva, while music was composed by Nakul Abhyankar and cinematography handled by Ajay V. Kulkarni.

== Music ==
The film's background score and songs were composed by Nakul Abhyankar. The "Sleepless Anthem" was released ahead of the theatrical debut.

== Release ==
Nidradevi Next Door was released theatrically across India on 12 September 2025.
