= Bigg Boss Kannada season 7 =

Indian reality television series

Bigg Boss Kannada
- Season 7
- Season 7 eye logo
- Hosted by: Sudeep
- No. of days: 112
- No. of housemates: 20
- Winner: Shine Shetty
- Runner-up: Kuri Prathap
- No. of episodes: 113

Release
- Original network: Colors Kannada
- Original release: 13 October 2019 – 2 February 2020

Series chronology
- ← Previous; Season 6 Next → Season 8

Bigg Boss 7 is the seventh season of the Kannada-language version of Indian reality television series Bigg Boss premiered on 13 October 2019. Sudeep returned as the host of the show for the seventh time. Based on votes given by viewers, Shine Shetty was the season winner. He was awarded a cash prize of 50 lakhs with an additional 11 lakh from other various sponsors, with a Tata Altroz car, for the first time in Bigg Boss Kannada history.

== Production ==
On Day 1, 18 contestants entered the Bigg Boss House. Due to show's popularity and more contestants in the house, the show was extended to another two weeks instead of the regular 98 days format and this season is the second longest season in the Bigg Boss Kannada version as compared to previous seasons.

== Housemate status ==
S.no.	Housemate	Day entered	Day exited	Housemates Status
1	Shine	Day 1	Day 112	Winner
2	Prathap	Day 1	Day 112	1st Runner-up
3	Vasuki	Day 1	Day 112	2nd Runner-Up
4	Deepika	Day 1	Day 111	3rd Runner-Up
5	Bhoomi	Day 1	Day 111	4th Runner-Up
6	Harish	Day 1	Day 107	Evicted
7	Priyanka	Day 1	Day 105	Evicted
8	Chandan	Day 1	Day 98	Evicted
9	Kishen	Day 1	Day 97	Evicted
10	Chandana	Day 1	Day 84	Evicted
11	Chaitra K	Day 1	Day 28	Evicted
11	Chaitra K	Day 44	Day 77	Evicted
12	Raju T	Day 1	Day 63	Evicted
13	Raksha	Day 43	Day 56	Evicted
14	Prithvi	Day 21	Day 49	Evicted
15	Sujatha	Day 1	Day 42	Evicted
16	Jagdish	Day 1	Day 35	Evicted
17	Rashmi	Day 1	Day 21	Evicted
18	Chaita V	Day 1	Day 14	Evicted
19	Ravi B	Day 1	Day 14	Walked
20	Gurulinga	Day 1	Day 7	Evicted

== Nominations table ==
	Week 1	Week 2	Week 3	Week 4	Week 5	Week 6	Week 7	Week 8	Week 9	Week 10			
	Week 1	Week 2	Week 3	Week 4	Week 5	Week 6	Week 7	Week 8	Week 9	Day 64-69	Day 70		
House; Captain	No captaincy												
Captain's Nomination	No captaincy												
Vote to:	Evict					Evict	none	none		WIN	Grand Finale		
Thanuja	No Nominations	Nominated	Safe Zone			Safe	Nominated		Nominated		''Winner (Day 70)		
Ramu	No Nominations	Nominated	Nominated			Safe			Nominated		1st Runner up (Day 70)		
Rithu	No Nominations	Safe	Safe			Safe		Finalist			2nd Runner up (Day 70)		
Srija	Not in the house					Safe			Nominated	Nominated	3rd Runner up (Day 70)		
Ramya	No Nominations	Safe				Finalist				Nominated	4th Runner up (Day 70)		
Divya	No Nominations	Safe		Finalist									
Kalyan	Not in the house					Safe							
Pavan	No Nominations	Nominated				Safe							
Ayesha	No Nominations	Nominated	Nominated			Safe							
Sanjjana						Safe							
Suman													
Bharani													
Emmanuel				Bharani	Evicted (Day 28)								
Against public vote	No Nominations'	Ayesha Pavan Sanjjana Thanuja Ramu	Ramu Abhai Ramya Kalyan Suman Ayesha	Ramu Bharani Emmanuel	Ramu Thanuja Bharani Ramya Ayesha	No Nominees	Ramu Abhai Rithu Kalyan Srija Sanjjana Suman	Srija Thanuja Ayesha Pavan Rithu	Thanuja Ramu Srija Kalyan	Divya Ramya Rithhu Srija Thanuja Ramu			
Walked													
Eviction		Pavan					Sanjjana	Ayesha	Kalyan		Ramya	Rithu	Thanuja
Eviction		Pavan					Sanjjana	Pavan	Kalyan		Srija	Ramu	Thanuja

indicates that the Housemate was directly nominated for eviction.
indicates that the Housemate was immune prior to nominations.
indicates the contestant has been evicted.
indicates the contestant walked out due to emergency.
indicates the contestant has been ejected.
indicates the house captain.

=== Nomination notes ===
- ^Note 1: During this week's nominations, the House Captain had a special power to directly nominate one of the non-nominated housemates.
- ^Note 2: In Week 6, the nominations took place on Day 35 before the Captaincy Task. And on Day 36, the House Captain was given a special power to directly nominate one of the non-nominated housemates.
- ^Note 3: In Week 7, housemates were allowed to distribute five nomination points between their two nominations, with a maximum of four points to be allocated to one housemate.
- ^Note 4: In Week 13, though the nominations took place, the voting lines were closed as the next week (Week 14) was announced as double eviction week.
