= Nila (2015 film) =

Indian Tamil-language romantic drama film

- Poster
- Directed by: Selvamani Selvaraj
- Written by: Selvamani Selvaraj
- Produced by: HP Gupta
- Starring: Sruthi Hariharan; Vicky Vijai
- Cinematography: Piyush Goswami; Shelley Calist; Thalabathi S S Chitradutt M
- Edited by: Rejith KR
- Music by: Jhanu Chanthar
- Production company: Skylab Pictures
- Distributed by: VizAudz Creations
- Release date: 2015
- Country: India
- Language: Tamil

Nila (transl. Moon) is a 2015 Indian Tamil-language romantic drama film directed by Selvamani Selvaraj and starring Sruthi Hariharan and Vicky Vijai. It was the first Tamil film to be screened at the Raindance Film Festival in 2016.

== Cast ==
- Sruthi Hariharan as Nila
- Vicky Vijai as Vimal
- Sarvesh Sridhar as Vimal's houseowner
- Rajan Sekri
- Srikanth
- Pooja

== Production ==
After watching Lucia (2013), Selvamani Selvaraj zeroed in on Sruthi Hariharan for the titular role. Vicky Vijai was chosen via auditions and Selvaraj felt that he suited the role of an emotional guy the best.

== Soundtrack ==
The music is composed by Jhanu Chanthar.

Track listing
No.	Title	Singer(s)	Length
1.	"Elangaathathu Veesuthu Kaathu"	Pradeep Kumar	2:10
2.	"Thanthaane Naane Naane Naa"

== Release and reception ==
The film was released directly on Netflix.

Reviewing the film at IFFI in 2016, Baradwaj Rangan of The Hindu wrote, "One way to describe the film is that it’s Before Sunrise, but with silence".

== Accolades ==
Year	Award	Category	Recipient(s)	Result	Ref.
2015	17th Zimbabwe International Film Festival	Best Actress	Sruthi Hariharan	Won	
2016	Cinequest Film Festival	Audience Award for Best First Film	Nila	Won	
