= Just Married (2025 film) =

Indian Kannada-language romantic drama film

- Theatrical release poster
- Directed by: C. R. Bobby
- Written by: C. R. Bobby
- Screenplay by: C. R. Bobby; Dhananjay Ranjan
- Story by: C. R. Bobby
- Produced by: B. Ajaneesh Lokanath; C. R. Bobby
- Starring: Shine Shetty; Ankita Amar; Devaraj; Anup Bhandari
- Cinematography: Parthiban G
- Edited by: Srikanth; Pratheek Shetty
- Music by: B. Ajaneesh Lokanath
- Production company: ABBS Studios
- Release date: 22 August 2025
- Running time: 126 minutes
- Country: India
- Language: Kannada

Just Married is a 2025 Indian Kannada-language romantic drama film written, directed and co-produced by C. R. Bobby, in her directorial debut, and produced jointly by B. Ajaneesh Lokanath under ABBS Studios banner. The film stars Shine Shetty, and Ankita Amar in the lead roles, while Devaraj, Anup Bhandari, Shruti, Sruthi Hariharan, Vani Harikrishna and Malavika Avinash play supporting roles. The music was composed by Ajaneesh, while the cinematography and editing were handled by Parthiban G and Srikanth respectively.

Just Married was released on 22 July 2025. The trailer was launched on 15 August 2025 by actor Rishab Shetty. The film mixed reviews from critics and underperformed at the box-office.

== Premise ==
Surya, the only heir of the 250-year-old "Vamshavruksha" family, must marry before 25 to escape a prophecy of hardship. His reluctant marriage to Sahana sparks a series of family complications, secrets, and struggles.

== Cast ==
- Shine Shetty as Surya
- Ankita Amar as Sahana
- Devaraj as Poornachandra
- Sriman as Shishupala
- Anup Bhandari as Anand
- Ravishankar Gowda as Vinay
- Sruthi Hariharan as Anjali
- Shruti as Gangamma
- Achyuth Kumar
- Malavika Avinash
- Vani Harikrishna as Mangala
- Sakshi Agarwal as Jyothi
- Sangeetha Anil
- Vedika Karkal
- Abhinav Vishwanathan
- Nelamangala Jayaram
- Vivek Chakravarthy
- Sudarshan G Bharadwaj
- Srivathsa
- Supriya Manimaran
- Lavanya Amar

== Soundtrack ==
The soundtrack, composed by B. Ajaneesh Lokanath consists of six tracks. The audio rights were acquired by Anand Audio.

Track listing
No.	Title	Lyrics	Singer(s)	Length
1.	"Mangalyam Thanthunanena"	V. Nagendra Prasad	Sanjith Hegde	4:23
2.	"Idu Modalane Swagathana"	K. Kalyan	Jaskaran Singh	5:01
3.	"Thappu Maadodu Sahaja"	Dhananjay Ranjan	Ananya Bhat	5:03
4.	"Abhimaniyagi Hode"	Pramod Maravanthe	Vijay Prakash	4:03
5.	"Kelo Machcha"	Nagarjun Sharma	Nakash Aziz	4:13
6.	"Ganesha"	Shashiraj Kavoor	Varun Ramachandra, Madhwesh Bharadwaj, Abhishek M R, Vishak	4:08
Total length:				19:36

== Reception ==
=== Critical response ===
A. Sharadhaa of Cinema Express rated the film 2.5/5 stars and wrote, "Every big Indian family drama comes wrapped in the same satin gift paper: rituals, laughter, a courtyard filled with gossiping relatives, and a camera that refuses to leave the wedding canopy."

Susmita Sameera of The Times of India rated the film 2.5/5 stars and wrote, "Just Married, directed by CR Bobby, ultimately feels like a “just missed” chance to revive the magic of big family dramas. Still, for those who enjoy such stories, it is worth a watch."
