= Ankita Amar =

Indian actress

Ankitha Amar
- Born: Mysuru, Karnataka, India
- Occupation: Actress
- Years active: 2012–present

Ankita Amarnath is an Indian actress, known for her work in Kannada television and films.

== Early life and career ==
Ankita Amar was born in Mysuru to a family of theatre artists and grew up in Bengaluru. She is a Bharatanatyam dancer and took singing classes from composer Rajan. She completed her master's of science from the JSS Medical College in Mysuru. She made her lead debut in the television soap opera Kulavadhu on Colors Kannada, which was her second television show. She was initially inclined to do a PhD in child psychology before she decided to take up a career in television starting with Nammane Yuvarani . She made her Telugu debut through the soap opera Srimathi Srinivas, which was a remake of the Tamil soap opera Thirumathi Selvam.

Ankitha made her feature film debut with the unreleased film Aba Jaba Daba co-starring Pruthvi Ambaar that was made in 2022. Her next two films that she signed were Ibbani Tabbida Ileyali and My Hero (both 2024). She played a NGO worker from Madhya Pradesh in My Hero, which ended up releasing first. Her next film is Sathya – Son of Harishchandra co-starring Nirup Bhandari.

== Filmography ==
Year	Title	Role	Notes
2024	My Hero		
2024	Ibbani Tabbida Ileyali	Anahita Madhumita Banarjee	SIIMA Award for Best Female Debut – Kannada; Filmfare Critics Award for Best Actress – Kannada
2025	Just Married	Sahana	

=== Television ===
Year	Title	Role	Network	Language
2012–2019	Putta Gowri Maduve	Young Suguna	Colors Kannada	Kannada
2014–2019	Kulavadhu	Meera	Colors Kannada	Kannada
2019–2022	Nammane Yuvarani	Meera Rajguru	Colors Kannada	Kannada
2021–2022	Srimathi Srinivas	Srimathi	Star Maa	Telugu
2023	Ede Thumbi Haaduvenu	Host	Colors Kannada	Kannada
2026	14th South Indian International Movie Awards	Host	Sun Udaya	Kannada
