= Sruthi Hariharan =

Indian actress (born 1989)

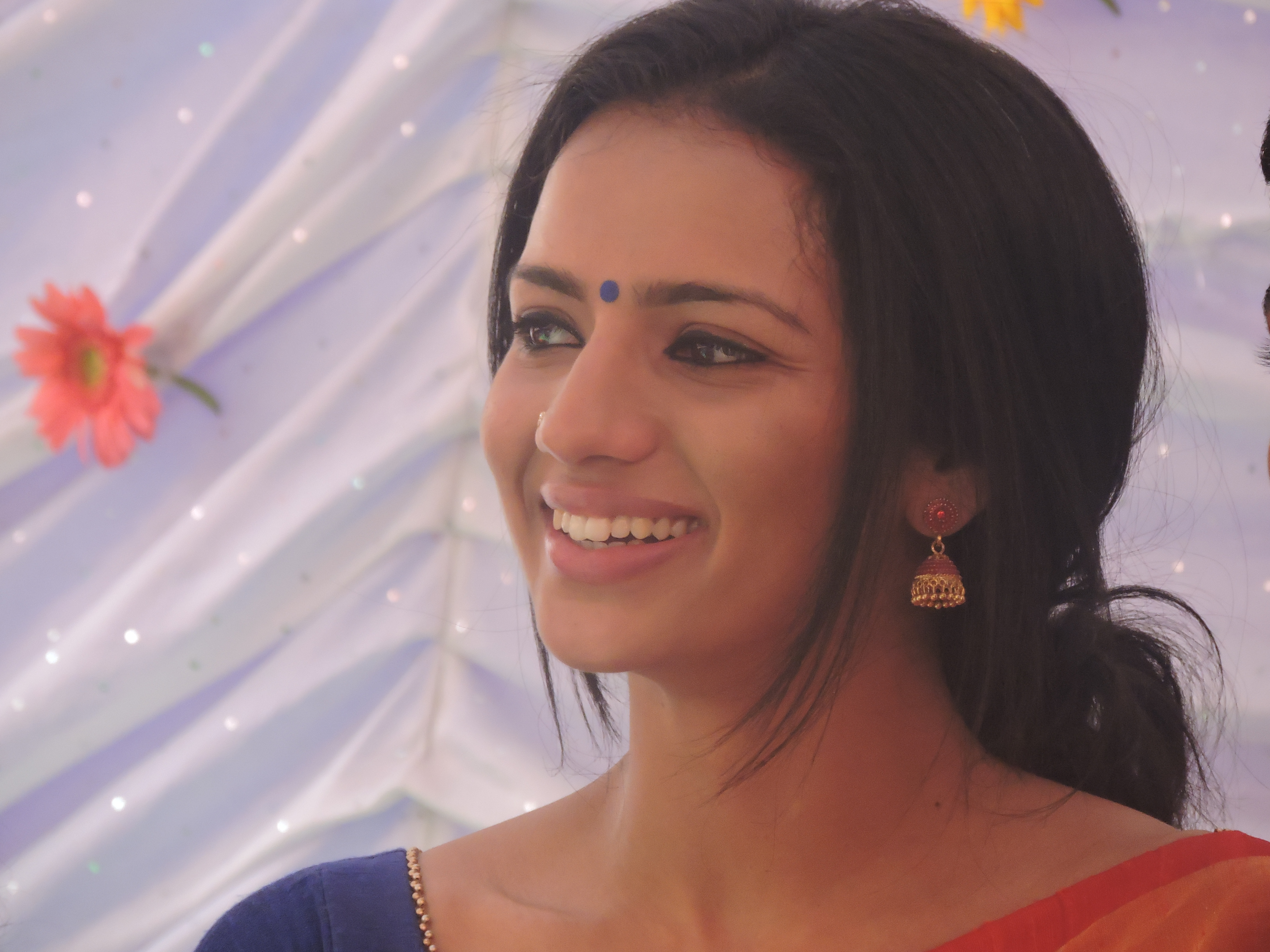
- Sruthi Hariharan in 2020
- Born: 2 February 1989 (age 37); Trivandrum, Kerala, India
- Occupation: Actor
- Years active: 2012–present
- Spouse: Raam Kumar (m. 2017)
- Children: 1

Sruthi Hariharan (born 2 February 1989) is an Indian actress who primarily appears in Kannada and Tamil films. Sruthi is a recipient of a National Film Award, three Filmfare Awards South and one Karnataka State Film Awards.

Sruthi made her acting debut in the Malayalam film, Cinema Company (2012). She had her breakthrough with her Kannada debut Lucia (2013). Sruthi won the Karnataka State Film Award for Best Actress and Filmfare Award for Best Actress – Kannada for her performance in Beautiful Manasugalu (2017). The 2018 film Nathicharami, won her the National Film Award – Special Mention. Sruthi established herself as a leading actress in Kannada cinema with Godhi Banna Sadharana Mykattu (2016), Urvi (2016), Upendra Matte Baa (2017) and Head Bush (2022).

== Early life and family ==
Sruthi Hariharan was born into a Tamil Brahmin family in Trivandrum, Kerala, and was raised in Bengaluru, Karnataka. She attended school at Sishu Griha Montessori and High School. After her primary and secondary education, she attended Christ University and graduated with a Bachelor of Business Management (BBM). She is trained in Bharatanatyam and contemporary dance. Apart from her mother tongue, she is also fluent in Kannada, Malayalam, and Hindi and can understand Telugu.

She became interested in cultural activities when she attended Christ College and became a part of their cultural team. This interest led her into acting in theatre productions. She joined choreographer Imraan Sardariya's dance troupe, and worked in the Kannada film industry as an assistant choreographer and background dancer. She was a background dancer for three years and featured in a number of songs.

== Career ==
Sruthi's film career began with Malayalam film, Cinema Company. She acted in two films: Thekku Thekkoru Desathu and Call Me @. In Francis's Call Me @, she played the role of an IT girl, while in Nandu's, Thekku Thekkoru Desathu she played a journalist. She landed the lead role in the Kannada film Lucia by Pawan Kumar. She played two characters in the film—one of a lower middle-class girl and the other of a film actress— and dubbed herself for the first time. Lucia was critically acclaimed and was later remade in several Indian languages. Sruthi's performance was well-received and she was featured on Rediff's Most Impressive Kannada Movie Debuts, 2013 list. Later that year she appeared in another Kannada film Dyavre. The film received rave reviews from critics. She was offered a role in director Harsha's Bhajarangi, featuring Shivraj Kumar in the lead, but she could not commit herself to the film.

In 2014, she was seen as the love interest of Srinagara Kitty's character in Jacob Varghese's road movie Savaari 2. Her next role was in her first Tamil film Nerungi Vaa Muthamidathe directed by Lakshmy Ramakrishnan. Next she acted in A. P. Arjun's Rhaate, which she signed to appear in even before the release of Lucia. Her character in the film was that of a traditional village girl.

She simultaneously shot for the Kannada film Sipaayi directed by Rajath Mayee, and the Tamil independent art film Nila. She has also signed to appear in another Kannada film, Godhi Banna Sadharna Mykattu by Hemanth Rao, and Balaji Sakthivel's next directorial Ra Ra Rajasekhar.

Godhi Banna Sadharna Mykattu went on to do very well both critically and at the box office. Her portrayal of Dr. Sahana was well received. She appeared next in Maadha Mathu Manasi, produced by Mano Murthy. She achieved further success in the Kannada film industry through her performance in director B.S. Pradeep Varma's Urvi, followed by Beautiful Manasugalu. She struck a balance between commercial and performance-oriented roles by featuring in films of diverse genres.

She next appeared in the Kannada multi-starrer Happy New Year, in which she played the role of a bedridden patient, ailing from psoriasis. After featuring in the bilingual film Vismaya, which was titled Nibunan in Tamil, she followed it up with the box office success Tarak, opposite Kannada actor Darshan.

Continuing her foray into the Tamil and Malayalam film industries, she was part of Bejoy Nambiar's film Solo, opposite actor Dulquer Salmaan. Later she acted in a Kannada film Upendra Mathe Baa with veterans Upendra and Prema. As part of the new wave in Kannada films, she acted in Humble Politician Nograj with Danish Sait and Sumukhi Suresh in which she played a supporting role, and was unanimously praised for playing such a character when her career was at a peak. She later acted in National award-winning director Mansore's Nathicharami opposite Sanchari Vijay for which she gained great critical acclaim. The film publication Karthik Kermanu wrote "There isn't a better actor than Sruthi to bring grace and seriousness to a character that throws light on the sexual needs of single women in urban middle-class societies. Whenever her face swims in the drudgery of everydayness, you feel her!” Keyur Seta of Cinestaan said "Hers is a simple subtle and a FLAWLESS Performance!" She starred in the film Aadyaa in 2020 with Chiranjeevi Sarja.

== Controversy ==
In October 2018, Sruthi accused Arjun Sarja of sexual misconduct on the set of the 2016 bilingual film Nibunan and filed a sexual harassment case with the police against him.

Arjun Sarja filed a defamation case of Rs 5 crore against her for accusing him of sexual misconduct. To her allegations, Arjun responded, "I am saddened by the allegations and I don't know how I can correct this. I will definitely file a case. I will speak about improving the shots and dialogues but I don't have the cheap mentality of using this profession to touch women inappropriately."

A few months after the MeToo fallout, Sruthi told The News Minute that while she used to get plenty of offers before, she hardly gets any now.

== Media image ==
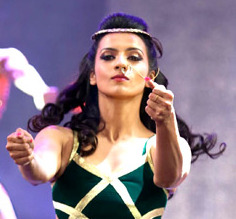
Hariharan at an event

Sruthi appeared in Rediff.com's "Top 5 Kannada Actress" and "Best Kannada Debuts" list of 2013. She was placed fourth and second respectively. In the Bangalore Times Most Desirable Women list, she was placed 18th in 2016 and 20th in 2019. Her performance in Nathicharami, is regarded as one of the "100 Greatest Performances of the Decade" by Film Companion.

== Personal life ==
In 2017, Shruthi married Raam Kumar, who is a martial artist and trainer and they have a daughter.

== Filmography ==
=== Films ===
Key
†	Denotes films that have not yet been released

List of films and roles
Year	Title	Role	Language	Notes	Ref.
2012	Cinema Company	Parvathi	Malayalam		
2013	Lucia	Shwetha	Kannada		
2013	Dyavre	Sruthi	Kannada		
2014	Savaari 2	Radhika	Kannada		
2014	Nerungi Vaa Muthamidathe	Maga	Tamil		
2015	Rhaatee	Rani	Kannada		
2015	Plus	Herself	Kannada	Special appearance	
2016	Jai Maruthi 800	Geetha	Kannada		
2016	Godhi Banna Sadharana Mykattu	Dr. Sahana	Kannada		
2016	Sipaayi	Divya	Kannada		
2016	Madha Mathu Manasi	Manasi	Kannada		
2017	Beautiful Manasugalu	Nandini	Kannada		
2017	Nila	Nila	Tamil	Netflix film	
2017	Urvi	Asha	Kannada		
2017	Happy New Year	Charvi	Kannada		
2017	Nibunan	Shilpa	Tamil	Bilingual films	
2017	Vismaya	Shilpa	Kannada	Bilingual films	
2017	Solo	Rukku	Malayalam	Bilingual films	
2017	Solo	Rukku	Tamil	Bilingual films	
2017	Tarak	Sneha	Kannada		
2017	Upendra Matte Baa	Seetha	Kannada		
2018	Humble Politician Nograj	Ramaa	Kannada		
2018	Rajaratha	Media reporter	Kannada	Special appearance	
2018	Bhootayyana Mommaga Ayyu	Sruthi	Kannada		
2018	Raambo 2	Herself	Kannada	Special appearance	
2018	Ambi Ning Vayassaytho	Young Nandini	Kannada		
2018	Nathicharami	Gowri	Kannada		
2019	Mane Maratakkide	Sowmya	Kannada		
2020	Aadyaa	ACP Sruthi Nayak	Kannada		
2022	Head Bush	Ratnaprabha	Kannada		
2024	Saramsha	Maya	Kannada		
2025	The Verdict	Namratha	Tamil		
2025	Doora Theera Yaana	Gowri	Kannada	Special appearance	
2025	Just Married	Anjali	Kannada		
2025	Nidradevi Next Door	Shruthi	Kannada		
2025	Bank of Bhagyalakshmi		Kannada	Guest appearance	
TBA	Strawberry †	Amrutha	Kannada	Completed	
TBA	NH66 †	TBA	Kannada	Filming	
TBA	Cheetah †	TBA	Kannada	Completed	

=== Web series ===
List of films and roles
Year	Title	Role	Language	Notes	Ref.
2018	America Mappillai	Shabana	Tamil	Special appearance	
2021	Vadham	Sakthi Pandiyan	Tamil		

== Awards and nominations ==
List of awards and nominations
Year	Film	Award	Category	Result	Ref.
2015	Nila	17th Zimbabwe International Film Festival	Best Actress	Won	
2017	Godhi Banna Sadharana Mykattu	64th Filmfare Awards South	Best Actress – Kannada	Nominated	
2017	Godhi Banna Sadharana Mykattu	64th Filmfare Awards South	Critics Best Actress – Kannada	Won	
2017	Godhi Banna Sadharana Mykattu	South Indian International Movie Awards	Best Actress – Kannada	Nominated	
2017	Beautiful Manasugalu	Karnataka State Film Awards	Best Actress	Won	
2018	Beautiful Manasugalu	65th Filmfare Awards South	Best Actress – Kannada	Won	
2018	Beautiful Manasugalu	South Indian International Movie Awards	Best Actress – Kannada	Nominated	
2018	Beautiful Manasugalu	South Indian International Movie Awards	Best Actress Critics – Kannada	Won	
2019	Nathicharami	66th National Film Awards	Special Mention	Won	
2019	Nathicharami	66th Filmfare Awards South	Best Actress – Kannada	Nominated	
2019	Nathicharami	66th Filmfare Awards South	Critics Best Actress – Kannada	Won	
2019	Nathicharami	South Indian International Movie Awards	Best Actress – Kannada	Nominated	
