= Saramsha =

- Theatrical release poster
- Directed by: Surya Vasishta
- Screenplay by: Surya Vasishta
- Produced by: Ravi Kashyap; RK Nallam
- Starring: Deepak Subramanya; Surya Vasishta; Sruthi Hariharan; Shweta Gupta; Aasif Kshatriya; Ravi Bhat
- Cinematography: Ananth Bharadwaj
- Edited by: Pradeep Nayak
- Music by: Songs: Udit Haritas; Score: Aparajith Sris
- Production companies: Vibha Kashyap Productions; Klapboard Productions
- Distributed by: Ameyukti Studios
- Release date: 15 February 2024
- Running time: 132 minutes
- Country: India
- Language: Kannada

Saramsha is a 2024 Indian Kannada language drama film written and directed by Surya Vasishta. The film is produced by Ravi Kashyap and RK Nallam. The film stars Deepak Subramanya, Surya Vasishta, Sruthi Hariharan, Shweta Gupta, Aasif Kshatriya and Ravi Bhat in lead roles. Cinematography was handled by Ananth Bharadwaj. The songs were composed by Udit Haritas and Aparajith Sris scored the background score.

== Plot ==
Tejas is a C.A. (chartered accountant), who wants to be a writer. One evening, his world collides with Abhay's. A story begins to unfold in front of him. He is faced with a character of his story. In the realm of magical realism, an emotional drama unfolds.

Saramsha is much like reading a novel - laden with metaphors and pop culture references within its rollercoaster of emotions.

== Cast ==
- Deepak Subramanya as Tejaswi Pandit
- Surya Vasishta as Abhay
- Sruthi Hariharan as Maya
- Shweta Gupta as Raksha
- Aasif Kshatriya as Narayan Pandit
- Ravi Bhat as Rajeev, Abhay’s dad
- Rramprasadd Banavara as Gundu
- Satish Kumar Saccha as Soundu
- Pruthvi Banwasi as Suresh
- Shruthi Pradeep as Aishwarya Pandit
- Namith Gowda as young Abhay
- Pranit as Abhay in his childhood
- Bhargava Raju as young Tejaswi
- Anish as Tejaswi in his childhood
- Prathima Vajra as English teacher

== Soundtrack ==
The songs are composed by Udit Haritas. Two tracks have been sung by Madhuri Seshadri and one by Pancham Jeeva. Udit Haritas has voiced a promotional song. Lyrics were penned by Pramod Maravanthe and Surya Vasishta.

Tracklist
No.	Title	Lyrics	Artist(s)	Length
1.	"Aparichitha"	Surya Vasishta	Madhuri Seshadri, Pancham Jeeva	3:14
2.	"Nasheyo Nakasheyo"	Pramod Maravanthe	Madhuri Seshadri, Udit Haritas	4:26
3.	"Teeradache"	Surya Vasishta	Pancham Jeeva	4:01
4.	"Saramsha"	Surya Vasishta	Udit Haritas	2:59
Total length:				14:40

== Reception ==
Harish Basavarajaiah from The Times of India rated the film four out of five stars and wrote that "Overall, the film leaves you with a haunting feeling that you end up getting after reading a good book or watching a great play or even having a pleasant conversation with a dear one!"
