= Ekam (TV series) =

2024 Indian anthology TV series

- Official poster
- Genre: Drama; Anthology
- Created by: Sandeep PS; Sumanth Bhat
- Written by: Satheesan Puthumana; Satyajit Rout; Sumanth Bhat; Shashikanth Shetty
- Screenplay by: Sumanth Bhat; Swaroop Elamon; Sankar Gangadharan; G S Bhaskar
- Directed by: Sumanth Bhat; Swaroop Elamon; Sanal Aman; Sankar Gangadharan; Vivek Vinod
- Starring: Prakash Raj; Raj B. Shetty; Shine Shetty; Pallavi Kodagu; Basuma Kodagu; Arunima Minj; Babu Annur; Ujwal U V
- Composers: Midhun Mukundan; Rahul Jigyasu
- Country of origin: India
- Original language: Kannada
- No. of seasons: 1
- No. of episodes: 7

Production
- Executive producer: Aaron Mac Ajith
- Cinematography: G. S. Bhaskar; Udit Khurana; Ankur Sanjeev; U. Ashwin
- Editor: Bhuvanesh Manivannan
- Production companies: Journeyman Films; Paramvah Studios

Original release
- Release: 13 July 2024 – present

Ekam (transl. One) is a 2024 Indian Kannada-language anthology television series directed by Sumanth Bhat, Swaroop Elamon, Sanal Aman, Sankar Gangadharan, and Vivek Vinod. It was produced by Journeyman Films and presented by Paramvah Studios. It has an ensemble cast including Prakash Raj, Raj B. Shetty, Shine Shetty, Pallavi Kodagu, Basuma Kodagu, Arunima Minj, Babu Annur, and Ujwal U V.

== Cast ==
Haaraata	Shoonya
Shine Shetty as Thomas; Pallavi Kodagu as Manjula; Prakash Thuminad as Mr. Kirikiri	Basuma Kodagu as Guruva
Dombaraata	Bhranti
Raj B. Shetty as Dhanaraja	Arunima Minj as Khushi
Swattu	Poorvachara
Suhan Shetty; Manasi Sudhir	Prakash Raj; Ujwal UV
Asmite
Babu Annur

== Episodes ==
The first season of the series has seven episodes. The first season of this series is titled Karavali after the coastal areas of Karnataka.

Series	Episodes	Originally released
1	7	13 July 2024

=== Season 1 (2024) ===
No.	Title	Directed by	Written by	Original release date
1	"Haaraata (transl. Flight)"	Sankar Gangadharan, and Vivek Vinod	Satheesan Puthumana	13 July 2024
2	"Shoonya (transl. Void)"	Sumanth Bhat	Sumanth Bhat & Shashikanth Shetty	13 July 2024
3	"Dombaraata (transl. Masquerad)"	Sumanth Bhat	Sumanth Bhat	13 July 2024
4	"Bhranti (transl. Delusion)"	Sumanth Bhat	Sumanth Bhat	13 July 2024
5	"Swattu (transl. Legacy)"	Sumanth Bhat	Sumanth Bhat & Satyajit Rout	13 July 2024
6	"Poorvachara (transl. Tradition)"	Sanal Aman and Swaroop Elamon	Satheesan Puthumana	13 July 2024
7	"Asmite (transl. Identity)"	Swaroop Elamon and Sanal Aman	Satheesan Puthumana	13 July 2024

== Production ==
The project began around January 2020. The series was shot in the coastal area of Udupi. The final cut of the series was completed in October 2021. The makers approached major streaming platforms to release the series, but they rejected the series. Later, the production companies decided to release the series on their own website.

== Release ==
The series was completed in 2021 but didn't get a chance to be released through major streaming platforms, so the production company Journeyman Films, along with Rakshith Shetty's Paramvah Studios, announced that they will release the series on its own exclusive website called www.ekamtheseries.com. The series premiered on 13 July 2024, on the website.

== Reception ==
Swaroop Kodur of The News Minute gave it three-and-a-half out of five stars and wrote, "Ekam is unhurried — each of the seven stories takes us to a very specific time and place in Udupi, with not more than a character or two in focus." A Sharadhaa of The New Indian Express gave it three out of five stars and wrote, "Its leisurely pacing, with 25-minute-long episodes, mirrors the slowness of coastal life and yet it still offers in-depth storytelling."

Pranati A S of Deccan Herald gave it three out of five stars and wrote, "The series features distinct flavours of Dakshina Kannada — bhootaradhane, fishmongers shouting bangude, bhootai, meen curry, the dialect and the landscapes." Sridevi S of The Times of India gave it three-and-a-half out of five stars and wrote, "A bouquet of unrelated stories also offers the audience a chance to skip, swap the episodes depending on their preferences. Some hits and some misses, but definitely unmissable, Ekam, meaning One, is a breath of fresh air in the webseries market."

Latha Srinivasan of Hindustan Times gave the series a positive review and wrote, "The seven episodes cover all genres from drama to comic satire, but Ekam definitely needed more diversity in terms of its directors and writers." Nalme Nachiyar of The Hindu wrote that "Ekam attempts to bring seven disjointed stories to life by experimenting with genre and language."
