= Dyavre =

2013 film

- Film poster
- Directed by: Gadda Viji
- Screenplay by: Yogaraj Bhat; Gadda Viji
- Story by: Gadda Viji
- Produced by: Jayanna; Bhogendra
- Starring: Yogaraj Bhat; Sathish Ninasam; Sonu Gowda; Sruthi Hariharan
- Cinematography: Guru Prashanth Rai
- Edited by: Sanat Suresh
- Music by: Veer Samarth
- Production company: Jayanna Combines
- Release date: 6 December 2013
- Country: India
- Language: Kannada

Dyavre is a 2013 Indian Kannada-language drama film written and directed by Gadda Viji and produced by Jayanna Bhogendra, co-produced by Rajesh Bhat. The film stars Yogaraj Bhat (in his acting debut), Sathish Ninasam, Sonu Gowda, and Sruthi Hariharan. The dialogues are written by Yogaraj Bhat and Gadda Viji. The songs are composed by Veer Samarth.

== Plot ==
The film revolves around of prisoners who land in jail for various reasons. In his first movie, director Gadda Viji has tried experimenting with a different colour He has excellently captured the innocence of criminals who land in jail for reasons not known to them and become victims of circumstances. Each criminal has his own story that touches your heart. There is drama in every criminal's life. Full marks to Gadda Viji for the brilliant way of handling stories of prisoners who land in jail for various reasons.

== Cast ==
- Yogaraj Bhat as Bhimsen
- Sathish Ninasam as Chinkara
- Sonu Gowda as Shruthi Kalappa
- Sruthi Hariharan
- Sonia Gowda as Chaya
- Rajesh Nataranga as Jaggu
- Sathya as Savanth
- Mico Nagaraj as Home Minister
- Chetan Gandarva
- Petrol Prasanna

== Production ==
The film is directed by Gadda Viji, an assistant director of Yogaraj Bhat, in his directorial debut. The film was earlier titled Pappasu Kalli.

== Soundtrack ==
Veer Samarth has composed the songs. Yogaraj Bhat and Jayanth Kaikini has penned the lyrics.

Track listing
No.	Title	Lyrics	Singer(s)	Length
1.	"Namma Aase"	Yogaraj Bhat	Ravi Basrur, V. Harikrishna	03:28
2.	"Yenano Helalende"	Jayanth Kaikini	Chethan Gandharva	03:59
3.	"Yello Bittu Bandevu"	Yogaraj Bhat	Krishna Bevra	02:20
4.	"Gantege"	Yogaraj Bhat	Ravi Basrur	03:40
5.	"Paapa Punya"	Yogaraj Bhat	Vijay Prakash	04:06
6.	"Neralu Helida"	Yogaraj Bhat	Chethan Gandharva	03:42
7.	"Angani"	Yogaraj Bhat	Chintan Vikas	04:50
Total length:				24:55

== Release and reception ==
The film released on 6 December 2013 along with Advaitha and B3. The film released to positive reviews. The Times of India gave the film a rating of four out of five stars and stated that "Each criminal has his own story that touches your heart". Bangalore Mirror wrote that "Overall, the film has a novel approach in not just story-telling, but the plot itself and the drawbacks are covered up quite cleverly." Deccan Chronicle wrote that "Barring a few scenes, Yograj has impressed all as a jailor with able support of the inmates - the roles were played by Neenasum Satish, and others". Sify wrote that "The debutante director has made a wise choice of selecting the perfect subject and perfect star cast to suit the characters for his debut movie. The movie has certainly made Gadda Viji join the list of promising directors of the year".
