= Kunjochhaya =

- Genre: Family
- Created by: Susanta Das
- Developed by: Sushanta Das
- Screenplay by: Lovely Mukherjee; Dialogues; Sourav Sengupta
- Story by: Star Jalsha
- Directed by: Pijush Ghosh
- Creative directors: Nafisa; Susmita
- Presented by: Bright Advertising Pvt. Ltd.
- Starring: Pallavi Dey; Somraj Maity; Shankar Chakraborty
- Theme music composer: Debjit Roy
- Opening theme: " Kunjo Chaya"
- Composer: Priyo Chattopadhyay
- Country of origin: India
- Original language: Bengali
- No. of episodes: 101

Production
- Executive producers: Reshmi, Shaoni (Star Jalsha)
- Producers: Susanta Das; Anandmohan Dassani
- Cinematography: Ashok; Shantanu
- Editor: Shubhajit
- Running time: 22 minutes (approx.)
- Production company: Tent Family Dassani Team

Original release
- Network: Star Jalsha
- Release: 26 August 2019 – 11 January 2020

Kunjo Chaya is an Indian Bengali television soap opera that premiered on 26 August 2019 and was broadcast on Bengali General Entertainment Channel Star Jalsha and is also available on the digital platform Hotstar. The show stars Pallavi Dey and Somraj Maity in lead roles with Shankar Chakraborty in a pivotal role. It marks the return of Somraj Maity into Bengali television. The show is produced by Tent Family Dassani Team.

== Premise ==
The show revolves around Subhash Sanyal and Shalik. Subhash Sanyal is a revered figure in the village. He is aged, but stout. He is known as Masterdadu. Masterdadu's right hand is Shalik. Subhash, aka Masterdadu, never compromises when it comes to others' wrongdoings. But that's his public image.

== Cast ==
=== Main ===
- Pallavi Dey as Shalik
- Somraj Maity as Ishaan -Subhash's grandson
- Shankar Chakraborty as Subash Sanyal - A retired teacher, who spent his life in a village. He is a man of principles.

=== Supporting ===
- Subrata Guha Roy as Arun Sanyal - Ishaan's elder paternal uncle, Mala's husband
- Animesh Bhaduri as Tarun Sanyal - Sejhuti and Ishaan's father
- Jayati Chakraborty as Madhuri Sanyal - Sejhuti and Ishaan's mother
- Tanuka Chatterjee as Mala Sanyal
- Rajib Bose as Rishav Sanyal - Mala elder son, Papri's husband
- Manosi Sengupta as Papri Sanyal - Rishav's wife
- Chandraniv Mukherjee as Srijon Sanyal- Mala's younger son
- Arpita Mondal as Rina Sanyal - Rony's sister, Srijon's wife
- Kinni Modak as Sejhuti - Ishaan's sister
- Sree Basu as Anuradha Maitra aka Anu - Subhash's daughter
- Sanjoy Basu as Ardhendu Maitra - Anu's husband
- Buddhadeb Bhattacharya as Sandipan Sen - Rony and Rina's father
- Ayush Mukherjee / Arindya Banerjee as Rony Sen - Rina's brother, Ishaan's rival
- Aritram Mukherjee as Anuttam Roy aka Vicky
- Fahim Mirza as Debottam Roy aka Rick / Debu
- Niladri Lahiri as Amalesh Roy
- Jayanta Banerjee as Sonailal Maitra
- Rikta Seth as Moumita Nandy
