= Shankarabharanna =

2026 Indian Kannada language film

- Directed by: Sumanth Bhat
- Written by: Sumanth Bhat; Trilok Trivikrama
- Story by: Shine Shetty
- Produced by: Shreeshaila; Divakar Shetty; Shine Shetty
- Starring: Shine Shetty; Tanvi Ram
- Cinematography: Udit Khurana
- Music by: Charan Raj
- Production company: Rangasthala Studios
- Release date: 20 November 2026
- Country: India
- Language: Kannada

Shankarabharanna is a 2026 Indian Kannada-language mystery horror comedy film directed by Sumanth Bhat from a story by Shine Shetty, who also plays the lead role along with Tanvi Ram in her Kannada debut. The film was released in theatres on 20 November 2026 and received mixed reviews from critics.

== Development ==
The film is directed by Sumanth Bhat and produced by Shreeshaila, Divakar Shetty and Shine Shetty under the banner of Rangasthala Studios. Shine Shetty also wrote the story, drawing inspiration from coastal tales he heard growing up, including those narrated by his grandmother. Director Sumanth has also co-written the screenplay and dialogues of the film along with Trilok Trivikrama. The music and sound design are by Charan Raj and Shreyank Nanjappa respectively, while cinematography is done by Udit Khurana.

== Plot ==
Shankara born in a coastal town of Udupi, Karnataka, grows up watching his father who was a bus driver and he dreams of becoming a driver himself. He eventually fulfils his ambition and works for Madhukara, but quits his job later due to some personal issues. Unable to find other employment, he purchases an abandoned bus that remained unused for years, with a loan after pawning his mother's jewellery and names it "Shankarabharanna" and begins operating it on the Udupi-Thoudugoli route, which was generally avoided by drivers because of haunted history of Thoudugoli village.

During his journeys, Shankara discovers that the bus is inhabited by a ghost and that its presence has connections with the mystery surrounding the village. His kind and friendly nature, which enables him to easily befriend others, also leads him to develop an unlikely friendship with the ghost also. Meanwhile, the story also follows his relationships with his father Vittallanna, elder sister Shanthi and girlfriend Jenny, as well as his bus companions Abu Uncle and Yoko. How Shankara gets involved in the mystery surrounding the bus and the village forms the rest of the story.

== Cast ==
- Shine Shetty as Shankara
- Tanvi Ram as Jenny
- Tanvi Rao as "Shree"Kala
- Deepak Rai Panaje as Vittala, Shankara's father
- Sampath Raj as "P. T. Sudha" Sudhakara
- Anilkumar as Madhukara
- Krithi B. Shetty as Shanti, Shankara's elder sister
- Mime Ramadas as Bhatru
- Umesh Srikanth Theli
- Nitesh Kulal
- Arjun Kaje

== Release ==
The film had its world premiere at the 39th Golden Rooster and Hundred Flowers Film Festival in Xiamen, China, becoming the first Kannada feature film to be officially selected and screened at the event. The film was released in theatres on November 20, 2026.

== Reception ==
The Times of India's Susmita Sameera rated the film 3.5 out of 5 stars, praising its technical aspects, performances and blend of humour, mystery and warmth, while noting the predictable portions and occasionally stretched pacing, and describing it as an enjoyable, light-hearted family-friendly comedy horror drama. The Hindu's Vivek M. V. praised the film's sound design, music and background score for creating an intriguing atmosphere, while criticising its lack of a fulfilling story.

Writing for the Cinema Express A. Sharadhaa described Shankarabharanna as a relatively simple film that prioritises its content, calling it "A bus ride worth experiencing." The News Minute's Subha J. Rao described Shankarabharanna as a blend of drama, humour and horror, highlighting its portrayal of the supernaturality and the power of vulnerability.

Deccan Herald's Pranathi A. S. rated the film 2 out of 5 stars, criticizing the gaps in screenplay, and lack of emotional depth, and noted that it missed an opportunity to deliver meaningful social commentary despite briefly touching caste-related issues. India Today's Sanjay Ponnappa rated the film 3 out of 5 stars, praising the performances, particularly those of Shine Shetty and Deepak Rai Panaje, as well as the cinematography, sound design and music and described it as a wholesome theatrical experience combining humour, mystery and emotions, despite some shortcomings in the first half.

Vishwavani News's Avinash G. R. rated the film 3 out of 5 stars, noting that despite its horror premise, the film uses light-hearted humour to make it suitable for family viewing. Vijaya Karnataka's Harshitha N. praised the film's fast-paced first half, blending horror, suspense and comedy, as well as its music, but criticised its slower second half, weaknesses in the screenplay and underdeveloped character backstories. Bangalore Mirror's Y. Maheswara Reddy felt that the film could have been a more effective if its runtime had been shortened, particularly in the second half.
