= Mithuna Raashi =

2019 Indian Kannada language TV series

- Genre: Drama
- Created by: Parmeshwar Gundkal
- Developed by: Nishchai Kadoor
- Directed by: Vinod Dhondale
- Creative directors: Rakesh Narayanpura, Chandan.S.V
- Starring: Swaminathan Ananthraman; Vaishnavi; Harini; Sampada Hulivana
- Opening theme: Mithuna Raashi
- Country of origin: India
- Original language: Kannada
- No. of episodes: 908

Production
- Producer: Vardhan Hari
- Cinematography: Mahadev Sogal
- Editors: Raju Aryan; Ramesh K.
- Camera setup: Multi-camera
- Running time: 22 minutes
- Production company: Vridhi Creations

Original release
- Network: Colors Kannada
- Release: 28 January 2019 – 27 February 2022

Mithuna Raashi is an Indian Kannada language television drama that premiered on Colors Kannada from 28 January 2019 to 27 February 2022.

Raashi, an independent girl, drives an auto-rickshaw to provide for her family. But, her life takes an unexpected turn when she reluctantly marries Mithun, the arrogant owner of a cab company.

== Plot ==
Upon learning from Samarth that he is staying alone from a young age, Mithun enquires the matter. He is surprised to learn that he has a family. Girija was happy as she learns that Samarth is her long lost son, Babu. Girija becomes emotional after Babu's arrival for a short stay and spends some quality time with him. Mithun, who searches for her, enquires Raashi and upon hearing Girija's voice, he goes towards her room. Upon witnessing Girija and Samarth having an emotional conversation, Mithun grows suspicious and confronts them about the reason for their concern. To prevent Mithun from learning about Samarth's identity, Girija diverts him with a story. Anuradha is left shocked when Suraksha reveals her true intention behind marrying Samarth.

As she learns about Suraksha's plans for Girija, Suraksha threatens that Raashi's marriage will be in jeopardy as she knew Samarth's true identity. When Mithun reveals that he hates Samarth, Girija faints. Kavitha pushes Girija off the stairs. While the doctor suggests physiotherapy for Girija's recovery, Kavitha suggests Samarth and proposes that he and Suraksha stay at their place till Girija recovers. Mithun completes the first part of the ritual by carrying Raashi in his arms while climbing the stairs. To prove that Raashi is a good wife and an ideal daughter-in-law, the priest asks her to identify the empty and the water-filled pots without touching the containers. Mithun asks Raashi to spill the secret that she's been wanting to tell him. Raashi reveals that Samarth actually is his brother Babu. Mithun decides to confront Girija and Samarth about the truth. Mithun accuses Samarth of playing with his feelings. Kavitha tells Suraksha that she plans to get Raashi kidnapped. The goons kidnap Rashi and leave the place. Bhavana and Samarth inform Mithun that Selva has kidnapped Raashi. Soon, Selva calls Mithun and threatens to punish Raashi if he defies his orders.

While Selva's goons are sleeping, Raashi gets her phone and sends Mithun her location. Mithun follows it and saves Raashi. Upon learning that Suraksha is the new MD of the company, Mithun grows furious and leaves the place and vents to Raashi. He gets upset with Samarth for letting Suraksha tag along with them and tells him not to disobey his orders again. To recover the company's losses, Suraksha reduces the salary of their cab drivers, who soon protest. Raashi arrives at his office and requests the cab drivers to stop protesting. Mithun dismisses suraksha from the post of M.D. However, Samarth argues with Mithun that when Suraksha was appointed as M.D, Samarth was given veto power. Prabhakar confronts Girija and blames her for bringing difference between Samarth and Mithun by relinquishing the Veto Power to Samarth.

== Cast ==
=== Main ===
- Swaminathan Anantharaman as Mithun: A money minded CEO; Raashi's husband; Girija's eldest son
- Vaishnavi as Raashi: Mithun's wife; a middle-class girl and auto (appi) driver

=== Recurring ===
- Yadu Shreshtha as Samarth aka Babu: Mithun's younger brother; Girija's younger son; Suraksha's husband.
- Pooja Durganna as Suraksha: Raashi's elder sister; Samarth's wife; a money minded girl
- Ramya Balakrishna as Kavitha: Prabhakar's second wife; Bhavana's stepmother
- Harini as Girija: Mithun and Samarth's mother
- Radha Jayram as Anuradha: Raashi and Suraksha's mother
- Deepa as Bhavana: Mithun and Samarth's paternal cousin; Prabhakar's only daughter; Kavitha's stepdaughter
- Unknown as Prabhakar: Mithun and Samarth's paternal uncle; Kavitha's husband; Bhavana's father

== Crossover ==
The serial had a crossover with Nammane Yuvarani for Maha Sangama episodes.

== Adaptations ==
Language	Title	Original release	Network(s)	Last aired	Notes	Ref.
Kannada	Mithuna Raashi ಮಿಥುನ ರಾಶಿ	28 January 2019	Colors Kannada	27 February 2022	Original	
Gujarati	Rashi Rikshawwali રાશિ રિક્ષાવાળી	24 August 2020	Colors Gujarati	12 August 2025	Remake	
Marathi	Jeev Majha Guntala जीव माझा गुंतला	21 June 2021	Colors Marathi	16 September 2023	Remake	
Bengali	Tumpa Autowali টুম্পা অটোওয়ালি	16 May 2022	Colors Bangla	31 March 2024	Remake	
Hindi	Saavi Ki Savaari सावी की सवारी	22 August 2022	Colors TV	15 September 2023	Remake	
Tamil	Ullathai Allitha உள்ளத்தை அள்ளித்தா	10 October 2022	Colors Tamil	9 January 2023	Remake	
