= Pallavi Dey =

Indian actress (1997–2022)

- Born: 23 February 1997; Howrah, West Bengal, India
- Died: 15 May 2022 (aged 25); Kolkata, West Bengal, India
- Cause of death: Suicide by hanging
- Other name: Mishtuu
- Occupations: Actress; Model
- Years active: 2017–2022
- Known for: Ami Sirajer Begum
- Partner: Sagnik Chakrabarty

Pallavi Dey (23 February 1997 – 15 May 2022), also known as Pallabi Dey, was an Indian actress, who worked in the Bengali film industry. She started her career with the Bengali serial Tobu Mone Rekho. She is best known for the serial Ami Sirajer Begum.

== Career ==
Pallavi started her career in 2017 with the serials Tobu Mone Rekho and Resham Jhanpi. In 2018, she was given the role of Lutfa in the serial Ami Sirajer Begum. Other work by Dey included Kunjochaya, Saraswatir Prem, and Mon Mane Na.

== Death ==
Dey died on 15 May 2022. According to The Times of India, she was found hanging from a ceiling fan and rushed to Bangur Hospital, where she was declared dead. She committed suicide. Dey lived with her partner Sagnik Chakroborty, and he informed the police that she had died. Dey's father, Nilu Dey, told the police that he believed that Chakroborty and another woman had murdered Dey. Garfa Police arrested Chakroborty on 17 May 2022 after a long interrogation.

Chakroborty is married, but had filed a petition for divorce, and had been living with Dey since then.

== Television ==
Year	Title	Character	Channels	Role	Notes
2017	Tobu Mone Rekho	Piya	Zee Bangla	Side Role	
2017–2018	Resham Jhanpi	Madhu / Bulbuli	Colors Bangla	Side Role	
2018– 2019	Ami Sirajer Begum	Begum Lutfunnisa	Star Jalsha	Lead Role	
2019–2020	Kunjochaya	Shalik	Star Jalsha	Lead Role	
2020–2021	Saraswatir Prem	Saraswati Sen	Sun Bangla	Lead Role	
2021–2022	Mon Mane Na	Gauri Burman	Colors Bangla	Lead Role	
2022	Bikram Betal	Rajkumari Pushpabati	Star Jalsha	Episodic Role	
