= Jeev Zala Yedapisa =

2019 Indian Marathi-language TV series

- Genre: Drama; Romance
- Written by: Chinmay Mandlekar
- Directed by: Vinod Lavekar
- Starring: See below
- Opening theme: "Jeev Zala Yedapisa" by Suhas Sawant
- Country of origin: India
- Original language: Marathi
- No. of episodes: 536

Production
- Producer: Nikhil Sheth
- Camera setup: Multi-camera
- Running time: 22 minutes
- Production company: Potadi Entertainment

Original release
- Network: Colors Marathi
- Release: 1 April 2019 – 3 April 2021

Jeev Zala Yedapisa (transl. Heart went crazy) is an Indian Marathi-language television series which aired on Colors Marathi. It premiered from 1 April 2019 and ended on 3 April 2021 by replacing Radha Prem Rangi Rangli. It is produced by Vinod Lavekar, directed by Nikhil Sheth and written by Chinmay Mandlekar under the banner of Potadi Entertainment.

== Summary ==
It is the story of the love and hate relationship of Shiva, an uneducated and immoral villager and Siddhi, a woman who values principles before anything else with almost nothing in common with each other.

== Cast ==
=== Main ===
- Ashok Phaldesai as Shiva Yashwant Lashkare
- Vidula Chougule as Siddhi Nandakumar Gokarna / Siddhi Shiva Lashkare

=== Recurring ===
- Mohan Joshi / Uday Tikekar as Yashwant Lashkare; Shiva's father
- Chinmayee Sumeet as Chandrakanta Deshmane (Aatyabai)
- Ruplaxmi Shinde as Malini Nandakumar Gokarna
- Anup Belwalkar as Vidyasagar Nandakumar Gokarna; Siddhi's elder brother
- Sharvari Jog as Sonal Yashwant Lashkare; Shiva's younger sister
- Vidya Sawale as Mangal Yashwant Lashkare; Shiva's mother
- Sumedha Datar as Vijaya Lashkare; Shiva's aunt
- Vikas Patil as Janardan Lakshman Waghmare (Jalwa)
- Rohit Kokate as Narpat Chikane
- Rohit Haldikar as Sarkar; Aatyabai's son
- Hemant Joshi as Mr. Bhave; Aatyabai's PA
- Amey Barve as Gaurav; Siddhi's boyfriend

== Adaptations ==
Language	Title	Original release	Network(s)	Last aired	Notes
Marathi	Jeev Zala Yedapisa जीव झाला येडापिसा	1 April 2019	Colors Marathi	3 April 2021	Original
Tamil	Idhayathai Thirudathe இதயத்தை திருடாதே	14 February 2020	Colors Tamil	3 June 2022	Remake
Gujarati	Prem Ni Bhavai પ્રેમ ની ભવાઈ	10 March 2020	Colors Gujarati	22 January 2022	Remake
Kannada	Ginirama ಗಿಣಿರಾಮ	17 August 2020	Colors Kannada	17 June 2023	Remake
Hindi	Bawara Dil बावरा दिल	22 February 2021	Colors TV	20 August 2021	Remake
Bengali	Mon Mane Na মন মানে না	30 August 2021	Colors Bangla	5 June 2022	Remake
