= Jeev Majha Guntala =

2021 Indian Marathi-language TV series

- Genre: Drama; Soap opera
- Story by: Jitendra Gupta
- Directed by: Mukesh Banekar Swapnil Mahaling
- Creative director: Yuvraj Ghorpade
- Starring: See below
- Country of origin: India
- Original language: Marathi
- No. of episodes: 754

Production
- Producers: Jitendra Gupta; Mahesh Tagde
- Camera setup: Multi-camera
- Running time: 22 minutes
- Production company: Tell-a-Tale Media Pvt. Ltd.

Original release
- Network: Colors Marathi
- Release: 21 June 2021 – 16 September 2023

Related
- Mithuna Raashi

Jeev Majha Guntala (transl. My life is involved) is an Indian Marathi language television series which aired on Colors Marathi. The show premiered from 21 June 2021. It starred Yogita Chavan and Saurabh Choughule in lead roles. It is an official remake of Kannada TV series Mithuna Raashi.

== Summary ==
It is the story of Antara whose family is going through a financial crisis. In this situation, along with studies, she also drives a taxi to support her family. The series ends with Chitra committing suicide, while Antara and Malhar live together with their son.

== Cast ==
=== Main ===
- Yogita Chavan as Antara Shitole / Antara Malhar Khanvilkar
- Saorabh Choughule as Malhar Khanvilkar

=== Recurring ===
Malhar's family

- Prajakta Navnale / Purva Shinde as Shweta Shitole / Shweta Megh Khanvilkar
- Sumedha Datar as Suhasini Khanvilkar
- Pratiksha Mungekar as Chitra Sudhakar Khanvilkar
- Bharat Daini as Sudhakar Khanvilkar
- Milisha Jadhav as Saumya Sudhakar Khanvilkar
- Ronak Shinde / Bipin Surve as Megh Khanvilkar (Banti)
- Milind Oak as Aajoba
- Veena Katti as Aaji
- Devdatta Nage as Tushar Desai

Antara's family

- Milan D'souza as Akshata
- Jyoti Date as Manjiri Shitole
- Shweta Mokashi-Kulkarni as Seema
- Ravindra Phaltankar as Keshav

== Adaptations ==
Language	Title	Original release	Network(s)	Last aired	Notes
Kannada	Mithuna Raashi ಮಿಥುನ ರಾಶಿ	28 January 2019	Colors Kannada	27 February 2022	Original
Marathi	Jeev Majha Guntala जीव माझा गुंतला	21 June 2021	Colors Marathi	16 September 2023	Remake
Bengali	Tumpa Autowali টুম্পা অটোওয়ালি	16 May 2022	Colors Bangla	31 March 2024	Remake
