= Sipaayi (2016 film) =

- Theatrical release poster
- Directed by: Rajath Mayee
- Written by: Rajath Mayee; Siddharth Mahesh
- Produced by: Siddharth Mahesh
- Starring: Siddharth Mahesh; Sruthi Hariharan; Sanchari Vijay; Achyuth Kumar
- Cinematography: Paramesh C M
- Edited by: Akshay P Rao
- Music by: B. Ajaneesh Loknath
- Production company: Orange Pixels
- Release date: September 2016
- Running time: 125 minutes
- Country: India
- Language: Kannada

Sipaayi is a 2016 Indian Kannada-language masala film written and directed by Rajath Mayee in his directorial debut. The film stars debutant Siddharth Mahesh (who also produced the film), and Sruthi Hariharan alongside Sanchari Vijay, and Achyuth Kumar in supporting roles.

== Premise ==
Siddharth is a news reporter, whose aim is to fight against illegal trading activities in Bangalore. However, his plans are thwarted by a crime boss Virat, who, he along with his friends Divya and Manju, set out to expose and bring to justice.

== Cast ==
- Sidharth Mahesh as Siddharth
- Sruthi Hariharan as Divya
- Sanchari Vijay as Manju
- Achyuth Kumar as Narasimharaju
- Gaurish Akki as Vishwanath
- Krishna Hebbale as Virat
- Bharath Singh as Abhay

== Production ==
Rajath Mayee and Siddharth Mahesh met on the sets of Lucia as they both were coproducers of the film. Sruthi Hariharan, who starred in Lucia, was cast in this film. Production started on 19 May 2014. Completed shoot with the song shoot on 4 July 2015.

== Soundtrack ==
Sipaayi (Original Soundtrack)

Soundtrack album by B. Ajaneesh Loknath
- Released: 20 May 2016
- Genre: Film soundtrack
- Length: 22:20
- Language: Kannada
- Label: D Beats

B. Ajaneesh Loknath chronology
Kirik Party (2016)	Sipaayi (Original Soundtrack) (2016)	Sundaranga Jaana (2016)

B. Ajaneesh Loknath composed the soundtrack of Sipaayi. The lyrics were written by Jayant Kaikini, Hrudaya Shiva, Chethan Kumar and Bharath Venkataswamy. B. Ajaneesh Loknath, Nanditha, Chinmayi, Shashank Sheshagiri, Bobby CR and Udith Haritas lent their voices for the songs. Audio released on 20 May 2016.

Track list
No.	Title	Lyrics	Singer(s)	Length
1.	"Muddu Pori"	Bharath Venkataswamy	B. Ajaneesh Loknath	04:36
2.	"Nee Nadiyagi"	Bharath Venkataswamy	B. Ajaneesh Loknath, Nanditha	04:45
3.	"Nanna Kanasina"	Jayant Kaikini	Chinmayi, B. Ajaneesh Loknath	04:32
4.	"Kannalle Meetingu (Superru Jodi)"	Chethan Kumar	Shashank Sheshagiri, Bobby CR	04:17
5.	"Yaara Haneyali"	Hrudaya Shiva	Udith Haritas	04:10
Total length:				22:20

== Reception ==
Sunayana Suresh of The Times of India gave 2.5 out of 5 stars and wrote "The filmmaker has tried his hand at narrating the subject in a non-linear manner. This is interesting, no doubt but the fact that he relies on the usual tropes of commercial cinema is what makes it tedius. While the maker has tried to be different with the screenplay, the commercial must haves like fights and songs slow down the narrative that should have kept one on the edge of the seat." The Hindu wrote "The film is narrated so poorly that it is only in the second half that we even learn about what the lead character does in the film."
