= Ginirama =

Indian Kannada language TV series

- Genre: Drama
- Developed by: Param, Vikas Negiyoni
- Written by: Girija Manjunath Ranibenoor
- Directed by: R. Preetham Shetty
- Creative director: Manju Gangavathi
- Presented by: Suresh
- Starring: Rithvik Mathad; Nayana Nagaraj
- Composer: Sunad Gowtham
- Country of origin: India
- Original language: Kannada
- No. of episodes: 770

Production
- Producer: Tejaswini Bhaskar
- Cinematography: V. Pawan Kumar
- Camera setup: Multi-camera
- Running time: 22 minutes
- Production company: Parinitha Productions

Original release
- Network: Colors Kannada
- Release: 17 August 2020 – 17 June 2023

Ginirama is an Indian Kannada language TV series that premiered on the Colors Kannada on 17 August 2020. The show is official remake of Marathi serial Jeev Zala Yedapisa airing on Colors Marathi.

== Plot ==
Ginirama is the story of the talented Mahathi and Shivaram. Mahathi’s runs in with Shivaram, the right-hand man of the local MLA Bhavani leads her to assume that the kind-hearted Shivaram is a ruffian. A game of politics and vendetta ensues between Bhavani and her archrival, where Mahathi and Shivaram are made pawns and forced into a marriage they are not ready for. Them, finding love amidst an ongoing political feud, forms the rest of the story.

== Cast ==
- Rithvik Mathad as Shivaram Deshpande, Shrikanth and Vidya's son, Seema's elder brother, Mahathi's husband
- Nayana Nagaraj as Mahathi Deshpande, Vinayak and Sharavathi's daughter, Yashas's younger sister, Shivaram's wife
- Chaitra Rao Sachin as Bhavani Byadgi a.k.a. Aaisaheb, Ranadheer's mother, MLA of Lakshmipura, Mahathi's biological mother
- Sujatha Kurahatti as Vidya Deshpande, Shrikanth's wife, Shivaram and Seema's mother
- Basavaraj Tiralapur as Shrikanth Deshpande, Ramakanth's elder brother, Vidya's husband, Shivaram and Seema's father
- Kaveri Bagalkote/Sheela as Seema, Shrikanth and Vidya's daughter, Shivaram's younger sister
- Lakshmi Siddaiah as Sharavathi Vinayak Shastri, Vinayak Shastri's wife, Yashas and Mahathi's mother
- Sushma Shekar as Neha, Shivaram's ex-lover
- Sandeep as Sundaramurthy, opposition party leader
- Varun Hegde/Ram Pavan as Ranadheer Sahukar, Aaisaheb's son
- Mruthyunjaya as Ramakanth Deshpande, Shrikanth's younger brother, Sandhya's husband, Prakhyath's father
- Jeeva as Nandya, Shivaram's sidekick and brother-like best friend
- Pradeep Raj as Chotya, Shivaram's sidekick
- Raki Gowda as Gaurav, Mahathi's ex-lover
- Prassana Jai as Prakhyath, Ramakanth and Sandhya's son
- HMT Vijay as Shinde, Aaisaheb's previous PA
- Nikitha Dorthody as Malavika, Seema's Teacher

== Adaptations ==
Language	Title	Original release	Network(s)	Last aired	Notes
Marathi	Jeev Zala Yedapisa जीव झाला येडापिसा	1 April 2019	Colors Marathi	3 April 2021	Original
Tamil	Idhayathai Thirudathe இதயத்தை திருடாதே	14 February 2020	Colors Tamil	3 June 2022	Remake
Kannada	Ginirama ಗಿಣಿರಾಮ	17 August 2020	Colors Kannada	17 June 2023	Remake
Hindi	Bawara Dil बावरा दिल	22 February 2021	Colors TV	20 August 2021	Remake
Bengali	Mon Mane Na মন মানে না	30 August 2021	Colors Bangla	5 June 2022	Remake
