= Bawara Dil =

Indian Hindi-language romance drama series

- Genre: Drama; Romance
- Created by: Nikhil Sheth
- Written by: Chinmay Mandlekar
- Story by: Chinmay Mandlekar; Dialogues; Anil Deshmukh
- Directed by: Randip Shantaram Mahadik
- Creative director: Saurabh Arora
- Starring: See below
- Narrated by: Salman Khan
- Theme music composer: A.V. Prafullachandra
- Opening theme: Bawara Dil theme
- Composer: Vijay Gawande
- Country of origin: India
- Original language: Hindi
- No. of episodes: 128

Production
- Executive producer: Vishal Upasani
- Producers: Nikhil Sheth (2021); Saurabh Tewari (2021)
- Production location: Mumbai
- Cinematography: Anil Katke; Mangesh Mahadik
- Editors: Ram Naidu; Vishal Mhatre; Pankaj M Singh
- Camera setup: Multi-camera
- Running time: 22 minutes
- Production companies: Happy High Creations (2021); Parin Multimedia (2021)

Original release
- Network: Colors TV
- Release: 1 February – 20 August 2021

Related
- Jeev Zala Yedapisa

Bawara Dil (transl. Crazy heart) is an Indian Hindi-language television drama series that aired on Colors TV. It stars Aditya Redij and Kinjal Dhamecha, and is the remake of the Marathi TV Series Jeev Zala Yedapisa. It premiered on 22 February 2021 and ended on 20 August 2021.

== Premise ==
In the Sangli district, a kind-hearted but uneducated man named Shiva and a righteous, educated and simple girl named Siddhi are forced by a local politician into a marriage.

== Cast ==
=== Main ===
- Aditya Redij as Shiva Lashkare:
  - Mangala and Yashwant's son, Sonal's brother, Siddhi's husband, Ishwar and Malini's son-in-law. He works for the local politician, Akka Bai.
- Kinjal Dhamecha as Siddhi Lashkare/Gokarna:
  - Malini and Ishwar's daughter, Sagar's sister, Shiva's wife, Yaahwant and Mangal's daughter-in-law.

=== Recurring ===
- Sumukhi Pendse as Chandrakanta Sarnaik aka Akka Bai– Sarkar's mother, head of the political party . She is a clever woman who is a mastermind in the field of politics. Shiva works under her .
- Sharad Ponkshe as Ishwar Gokarna – Malini's husband, Siddhi and Sagar's father, Shiva's father-in-law(2021. He is a teacher and is the most educated and reputed person of Rudrayat who is immensely respected by everyone. He has a very strong connection with his daughter, Siddhi.
- Mrunal Deshpande as Malini Gokarna – Ishwar's wife, Siddhi and Sagar's mother, Shiva's mother-in-law. She is a housewife and a very spiritual woman who always scolds Siddhi to perform house chores.
- Siddhesh Prabhakar as Sagar Gokarna– Ishwar and Malini's son, Siddhi's brother, Shiva's brother-in-law. He is a greedy person who is fantasised by Akka Bai's wealth and political power and wants to work with her.
- Rudra Kaushik as Ashish aka Aashu – Siddhi's friend .
- Akansha Sakharkar as Akshita – Siddhi's friend . She is a close friend of Siddhi and her fiance Gaurav. She attends all the pre-wedding ceremonies at Siddhi's house.
- Dharyashil Gholap as Sarkar Deshmane – Akka Bai's son, Sonal's fiance . He is the spoiled child of Akka Bai and is a drug addicted person who always has bad intentions towards women.
- Vihan Verma as Vinay – Siddhi's friend
- Neeraj Goswami as Gaurav Inamdaar– Siddhi's fiance. He is the former fiance of Siddhi before her marriage to Shiva. They both had been dating each other for a few years.
- Kiran Karmarkar as Yashwant Lashkare– Shiva and Sonal's father, Mangal's husband, Siddhi's father-in-law. He is a government official and a man of ethics. He always opposed Shiva's work for Akka Bai and her political party and always made him realise that his money has been earned from wrong deeds. He has a strong bond of father-daughter with Siddhi and he always appreciates her.
- Ruchi Tripathi as Sonal Lashkare aka Soni– Mangal and Yashwant's daughter, Shiva's sister, Siddhi's sister-in-law. She is a young, beautiful and cheerful girl who is loved by everyone in the family. She wants Shiva and Siddhi to be together forever with their whole heart. She is an average student studying in a college.
- Smita Saravade as Mangal Lashkare– Shiva and Sonal's mother, Yashwant's wife, Siddhi's mother-in-law. She's a clever, greedy woman enjoying a comfortable life with Shiva's money. She initially hates Siddhi extremely and tries her best to throw her out of her house.
- Mayur Khandge as Vilas Lashkare– Vijaya's husband, Yashwant's brother, Mangal's brother-in-law, Shiva and Sonal's paternal uncle, Bunty-Bablu's father. He is the partner-in-crime of Mangal. They both hate Siddhi initially and plot and execute different plans together, in order to drag Siddhi out of their house.
- Vibhawari Pradhan as Vijaya Lashkare– Shiva and Sonal's paternal aunt, Vilas' wife, Bunty-Bablu's mother . She is a kind-hearted, sweet and simple woman. She is a housewife and cooks delicious food. All the children in house have a strong bond with her due to her loving and caring nature.
- Dinesh Vadhya as Bunty– Vilas and Vijaya's son, Bablu's brother, Shiva and Sonal's paternal cousin brother, Siddhi's brother-in-law.
- Gandhar Kharpudikar as Bablu– Vilas and Vijaya's son, Bunty's brother, Shiva and Sonal's paternal cousin brother, Siddhi's brother-in-law.
- Tushar Phulke as Bhave– Akka Bai's personal secretary.
- Radha Sagar as Soumya– The girl who was harassed by Sarkar in public but was saved by Shiva.
- Abhidnya Bhave as Jhanvi– Shiva's former lover who left him 5 years ago and married some other guy for his wealth.
- Sandeep Kumaar as Kiran– Sonal's teacher.
- Chitragupta Sinha as Old Man (Tempo Driver), (Episode 30, "Shiva Siddhi face a challenge")
- Krishna Kant Singh Bundela as Jyotish

== Production ==
Bawara Dil's first episode was narrated by Salman Khan. The show's broadcast time slot was swapped with Pinjara Khubsurti Ka from 1 July 2021.

== Adaptations ==
Language	Title	Original release	Network(s)	Last aired	Notes
Marathi	Jeev Zala Yedapisa जीव झाला येडापिसा	1 April 2019	Colors Marathi	3 April 2021	Original
Tamil	Idhayathai Thirudathe இதயத்தை திருடாதே	14 February 2020	Colors Tamil	3 June 2022	Remake
Kannada	Ginirama ಗಿಣಿರಾಮ	17 August 2020	Colors Kannada	17 June 2023	Remake
Hindi	Bawara Dil बावरा दिल	22 February 2021	Colors TV	20 August 2021	Remake
Bengali	Mon Mane Na মন মানে না	30 August 2021	Colors Bangla	5 June 2022	Remake
