= Idhayathai Thirudathe =

Indian television series

- Genre: Action Drama; Romance
- Created by: Ram Srinivas
- Written by: Thamayanthi (episodes 1–200) Rathibala (episode 200–present)
- Directed by: Radhakrishnan RK
- Starring: Navin Kumar; Hima Bindhu; Baby Aazhiya
- Theme music composer: Sudarshan M Kumar
- Country of origin: India
- Original language: Tamil
- No. of seasons: 2
- No. of episodes: 1097

Production
- Executive producer: Gayathri Paramasivam
- Producer: Kusumavathy
- Cinematography: Karthik Subramaniam
- Camera setup: Multi-camera
- Running time: 40 minutes per episode
- Production company: Estrella Stories

Original release
- Network: Colors Tamil
- Release: 14 February 2020 – 3 June 2022

Related
- Jeev Zala Yedapisa

Idhayathai Thirudathey (lit. Don't steal the heart) is an Indian Tamil-language series airing on Colors Tamil. It premiered on 14 February 2020 and last aired on 3 June 2022. The show stars Navin Kumar and Hima Bindhu. The show is the official remake of Marathi series Jeev Zala Yedapisa aired on Colors Marathi.

Sahana (Hima Bindhu) and Siva (Navin Kumar) marry due to political war triggered by them. But Sahana and Siva start to understand each other. But problems arise from Siva's mother and MLA who Siva is working for, and ex-MLA. In August 2021, a 6-year leap was introduced where several new characters were introduced. These included Sahana and Siva's daughter; Aiswarya Jr.

== Summary ==
It is an enemies to lovers romance of Siva and Sahana. Initially, they don't like each other, but they are forced to get married due to family and political pressure.

Siva is a goon-like man. He isn't well educated. Sahana is a well educated, disciplined and stands for the right thing. After certain events, Siva and Sahana come to understand and love each other, but Bhavani (Siva's mother) and MLA Dhakshayani who Siva is working for plots to break them up constantly.

== Plot ==
=== Season 1 ===
Sahana, a bride-to-be, notices her friend being beaten up by Siva, the handyman of the local politician, Dhakshayani. Siva's act leaves Sahana fuming with rage. Later, Sahana witnesses yet another disrespectful and foul behavior of Siva towards a young woman. After witnessing the incident of Siva, Sahana gets distraught. Sahana decides to speak up against the injustice and gives her statement against Siva to the police. However, oblivious to the fact that while she testified against him, Siva manages to identify her despite her disguise. Planning on teaching Sahana a lesson, Siva kidnapped Sahana. Sahana's wedding comes to a shocking halt when the family discovers that she is nowhere to be found. While Sahana's family faces humiliation, Sahana's wedding gets called off. Siva releases Sahana after keeping her in captivity as an act of revenge. Getting humiliated by Vanavarayan, Dhakshayani asks Sahana's parents to get Sahana married to Siva. At first, Siva and Sahana refrained but were compelled to agree. Sahana and Siva exchange vows and promise to be with each other, with rage and revenge in the heart. After their wedding, initially, they both hated each other but the days go by Sahana and Siva have a strong connection building up between them.

=== Season 2 ===
Six years later

This the story of Sahana, Siva and their daughter Aiswarya. Some issues because of Dhakshayani, Siva and Sahana break their relationship. Then, Jr. Aiswarya (Siva and Sahana's daughter) is under Sahana's custody. One day, Aiswarya gets kidnapped by goons and when she try to escape, she ended up in Siva's car. Later, Siva handle's Aishu to police and she meets her mother. Aishu told Sahana about how King take care of her. Aishu invites King to her birthday party. At the function, Sahana and Siva meets for the first time after six years. Siva get knows that Aishu is his daughter.

== Cast ==
=== Main ===
- Navin Kumar as Siva "Rowdy Singam/King" Neelakandan – A local gangster; Neelakandan and Bhavani's son; Aiswarya's brother; Sahana's husband; Jr. Aiswarya's father
- Hima Bindhu as Sahana Somasundaram / Sahana "Raangi" Siva – A businesswoman; Somasundaram and Devagi's daughter; Elangovan's sister; Siva's wife; Jr. Aiswarya's mother
- Baby Aazhiya as Jr. Aiswarya "Aishu" Siva – Siva and Sahana's daughter

=== Supporting ===
- Riya Madona / Lavanya Manickam / Nithya Raj as Aiswarya "Aishu" Neelakandan – Neelakandan and Bhavani's daughter; Siva's sister (Dead)
- B. Nilani as Dhakshayani – Siva's arch-rival; Sethupathi's mother; Aiswarya's murderer
- Sam as Sethupathi aka Sethu – Dhakshayani's son; Siva's rival; Aiswarya's husband and murderer
- Ilavarasan / Ashok as Neelakandan – Godhandapani's brother; Bhavani's husband; Siva and Aiswarya's father; Jr. Aiswarya's grandfather
- Siva Kavitha / Caroline Hiltrud as Bhavani Godhandapani / Bhavani Neelakandan – Neelakandan's wife; Siva and Aiswarya's mother; Jr. Aiswarya's grandmother
- Ananthan as Godhandapani – Neelakandan's brother; Valli's husband; Ram and Lakshmanan's father
- Karthiga as Valli Godhandapani – Godhandapani's wife; Ram and Lakshmanan's mother
- Deepan as Ram Godhandapani – Valli and Godhandapani's elder son; Lakshmanan's brother
- Domnick Nithies as Lakshmanan Godhandapani – Valli and Godhandapani's younger son; Ram's brother
- Issac Varghese as Somasundaram – Devagi's husband; Elangovan and Sahana's father; Jr. Aiswarya and Karthiga's grandfather
- Meenakshi as Devagi Somasundaram – Somasundaram's wife; Elangovan and Sahana's mother; Jr. Aiswarya and Karthiga's grandmother
- Karthik Sasidharan / Vijay Lokesh / Bhalakhoumhar as Elangovan Somasundaram – Somasundaram and Devagi's son; Sahana's brother; Nithya's husband; Karthiga's father
- Adhitri Dinesh / Subathra as Nithya Elangovan – Elangovan's wife; Karthiga's mother
- Baby Nazriya as Karthiga Elangovan – Elangovan and Nithya's daughter
- Rithieshwar as Karthik – Siva's adopted brother
- Ragava Sabari as Suruttai – Siva's friend
- Mounika Devi as Mithra
- Venkatesan as Rathnam – Dhakshayani's assistant
- Birla Bose as Vanavarayan – Dhakshayani's arch-rival; Manjula's husband; Amirtha's father
- Devi Teju as Manjula Vanavarayan – Vanavarayan's wife; Amirtha's mother
- Deepabalu as Amirtha Vanavarayan – Vanavarayan and Manjula's daughter
- Vijaya Patti as Vanavarayan's mother
- Rajesh as Parattai – Siva's friend
- Soundar as Kannadhasan aka Tamizh – A Tamil teacher
- Gemini Manikandan as Vetri
- Vishnukanth as Selvam
- Jay Sk as Parthasarathy aka Parthi – Sahana's ex-fiancé
- Srinidhi Sudharshan as Ramya – Sahana's friend
- Mahesh Prabha as Vignesh – a police officer
- Syed Aneesh as Rajkumar – Aiswarya's ex-fiancé
- Subash Kannan as Kannadi – Vanavarayan's assistant

=== Special appearances ===
- Jay Srinivas Kumar as Parthasarathy
- Dr. Nithuchandra Duraisamy as Niranjana
- Robo Shankar as Himself
- Raksha Holla as Sankari – English Teacher
- Aarthi as Aarthi – Sahana and Elangovan's cousin
- Seethalakshmi Hariharan as Priya Saravanan – Sahana's friend; Saravanan's wife
- VJ Pappu as Saravanan – Priya's husband
- Anandrafee as Manmadhan – Priya's cousin
- Jeevitha as Malliga – Commissioner of Police
- VJ Saravana Kumar as Deepak
- Nancy Jennifer as Anitha – Siva's cousin
- Durgaa as Geetha – Siva's cousin
- VJ Aadhavan as Himself
- Niharikka Rajesh as Meera – Siva's student girl
- Amit Bhargav as Velu
- Sameer Ahamathu as DCP Suryakumar Sivaraman Zamindar – An inspiring police officer; Kayal's husband; Siva's family friend (Mahasangamam with Sillunu Oru Kaadhal)
- Darshini Gowda as Kayalvizhi "Kayal" Suryakumar Zamindar – A teenager; Surya's wife; Sahana's friend

== Adaptations ==
Language	Title	Original release	Network(s)	Last aired	Notes
Marathi	Jeev Zala Yedapisa जीव झाला येडापिसा	1 April 2019	Colors Marathi	3 April 2021	Original
Tamil	Idhayathai Thirudathe இதயத்தை திருடாதே	14 February 2020	Colors Tamil	3 June 2022	Remake
Kannada	Ginirama ಗಿಣಿರಾಮ	17 August 2020	Colors Kannada	17 June 2023	Remake
Hindi	Bawara Dil बावरा दिल	22 February 2021	Colors TV	20 August 2021	Remake
Bengali	Mon Mane Na মন মানে না	30 August 2021	Colors Bangla	5 June 2022	Remake
