= Shine Shetty =

Indian Actor

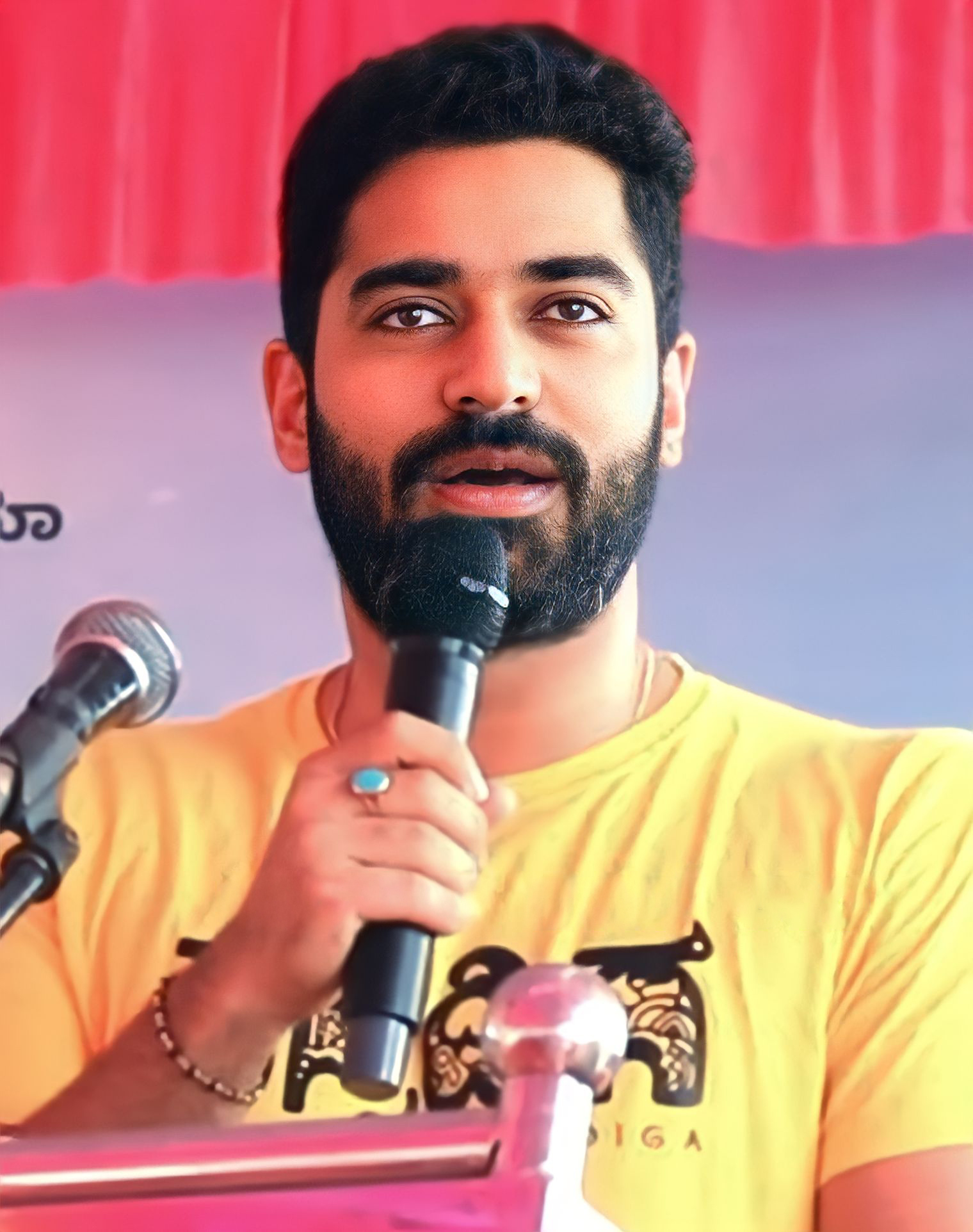
- Born: Kundapura, Karnataka, India
- Education: Bachelor of Business Management
- Occupations: Actor; Singer; Television host
- Years active: 2014-2025
- Known for: Bigg Boss Kannada (season 7)

Shine S Shetty is an Indian film and television actor who works predominantly in Kannada cinema. He started his career with the Tulu language film Kudla Cafe.

== Biography ==
Shine left his college studies to work as a local TV anchor and later received formal acting training in Mumbai. He came in 2014 with the TV show Meera Madhava. In 2014, he joined the singing reality show Star Singer. Shine ventured into films starting with Kudla Cafe in 2016, followed by Asthitva (2016) and Gvana Yajna (2018). He won Bigg Boss Kannada season 7 in 2020.

== Filmography ==
=== Films ===
Year	Film	Role	Notes	Ref
2016	Kudla Cafe		Tulu film	
2016	Asthitva	Vicky		
2017	Ondu Motteya Kathe	English lecturer		
2018	Sarkari Hi. Pra. Shaale, Kasaragodu, Koduge: Ramanna Rai	District Collector Kasaragodu		
2018	Gvana Yajna			
2022	Harikathe Alla Girikathe	Talkative lover		
2022	Prayashaha			
2022	Vijayanand	Paatil		
2022	James	Ekanth		
2022	Kantara	Devendra's father		
2023	Hostel Hudugaru Bekagiddare	Senior		
2024	Bachelor Party	Ashok		
2024	Maryade Prashne	Shetty		
2025	Nidradevi Next Door	Vikram		
2025	Just Married	Surya		
2026	Shankarabharanna	Shankara	Also wrote the story and co-produced it	

== Television ==
Year	Title	Role	Notes and Ref.
2014	Meera Madhava	Madhava	
2014	Star Singer	Contestant	
2015	Swalpa Adjust Madkolli	Anchor	
2015	Lakshmi Baramma	Chandu	
2019	Bigg Boss Kannada (season 7)	Contestant	Winner
2021	Dance Dance	Anchor	
2023	Bigg Boss Kannada (season 10)	Guest	
2024	Ekam	Thomas	
