= Srimathi Srinivas =

- Genre: Drama
- Country of origin: India
- Original language: Telugu
- No. of seasons: 1
- No. of episodes: 224

Production
- Camera setup: Multi-camera
- Running time: 22 minutes
- Production company: Pixel Pictures Pvt. Ltd.

Original release
- Network: Star Maa
- Release: 20 December 2021 – 24 September 2022

Related
- Thirumathi Selvam

Srimathi Srinivas (transl. Mrs Srinivas) is an Indian Telugu-language television drama that began airing on Star Maa on 20 December 2021. The show also streams on Disney Plus Hotstar . It is the remake of 2007 Tamil series Thirumathi Selvam, which aired on Sun TV. It stars Ashwin and Ankita Amar.

== Plot ==
Srinivas, a mechanic falls in love with Sridevi who is a straightforward girl. To protect his love, he bluffs about his true identity and marries her. What happens when Sridevi gets to know the truth forms the rest of the story.

The show is produced by Pixel Pictures Pvt. Ltd.

== Cast ==
=== Main ===
- Ashwin (2022) as Srinivas: Sridevi's husband; Gopalam's son; Mangala's step-son; Vicky and Mouni's half-brother
  - Chandan Kumar (2021–2022) as Srinivas
- Ankita Amar as Sridevi: Srinivas's wife; Meenakshi and Madhava Rao's daughter; Vinod, Kavya and Karthika's sister

=== Recurring ===
- Sri Charan as Madhav Rao; Sridevi's father
- Usha Sri (2022) as Meenakshi; Sridevi's mother
  - Sheela (2021–2022) as Meenakshi
- Jyothi Reddy as Mangala: Srinivas's stepmother; Gopalam's second wife; Vicky and Mouni's mother
- Vishwa Mohan as Gopalam; Srinivas's biological father
- Basawaraj as Kikku; Srinivas's friend
- Srikar Krishna as Arjun; Sridevi's ex-fiance
- Uma Devi as Nagamani; Daksha & Gautham's mother
- Manasa Lanka as Anitha
- Bramar as Gautham; Daksha's brother
- Madhu Krishna as Daksha
- Ajay Kiran as Vicky; Srinivas's brother
- Teja Chowdary as Prakash
- Kiran Kanth as Santhosh
- Gopala Krishna Akella as Priest
- Jabardasth Ganapathi as Priest
- Netra Reddy as Geetha
- Baby Hasya Chaitra as Daksha's daughter
- Hasini Tarak as Sridevi's second younger sister
- Priya Prasad as Vidya; Srinivas's sister
- Amulya Reddy
- Aaradya Paruchuri as Kavya
- Unknown as Vinod
- Kavya Shree as Guest Appearance
- Sireesha Vallabhaneni as Guest Appearance

| Language | Title | Original release | Network(s) | Last aired |

== Production ==
The series had actor Chandan Kumar returning to the Telugu television industry after a brief gap. The serial had Kannada actress Ankita Amar debuting into Telugu television through this serial. The show is produced by Pixel Pictures Pvt. Ltd.
