= Saraswatir Prem =

2020 Indian Bengali television drama series

- Promotional Poster
- Bengali: সরস্বতীর প্রেম
- Genre: Drama; Romance; Comedy
- Screenplay by: Ashrunu Maitra; Dialogue; Premashish Dey
- Directed by: Amit Sengupta
- Starring: Pallavi Dey; Abhishek Veer Sharma; Swastika Ghosh
- Voices of: Manjima Bhattacharyya Maitra
- Theme music composer: Soumik Ranjan
- Opening theme: Saraswatir Prem
- Country of origin: India
- Original language: Bengali
- No. of seasons: 1
- No. of episodes: 173

Production
- Executive producers: Priyojit Das, Soumik Ranjan; Arghya, Supreeti (Sun Bangla)
- Producer: Joydeb Mondal
- Production location: Kolkata
- Cinematography: Pintu Shee
- Camera setup: Multi camera
- Running time: 21 minutes (approx)
- Production company: J D Productions

Original release
- Network: Sun Bangla
- Release: 7 December 2020 – 30 May 2021

Saraswatir Prem (The Lovelife of Saraswati) is an Indian Bengali television romantic comedy drama. The show aired on Bengali General Entertainment Channel Sun Bangla and is also available on digital platform Sun NXT, that premiered on 7 December 2020 and ended on 30 May 2021. It was generated by J D Productions Private Limited and starred by Pallavi Dey and Abhishek Veer Sharma.

== Premise ==
Belonging to a conservative family, Saraswati considers that love is equal to danger. In contrast, being only earning member of his family, Rohit considers that love is equal to money. Due to a complicate situation, Saraswati was forced to fake a marriage between her and Rohit but eventually they fall in love with each other. Then, how they face all the struggles while sticking together follows the crux of the story.

== Cast ==
=== Main ===
- Pallavi Dey as Saraswati Sen
- Abhishek Veer Sharma as Rohit

=== Recurring ===
- Swastika Ghosh as Bubli, Rohit's younger sister. supporting character who played an important role within the family storyline.
- Sandip Dey as Sudip Sen: Saraswati's eldest paternal uncle
- Namita Chakraborty as Mala Sen: Sudip's wife
- Madhumita Tusii as Jamuna Sen: Sudip's daughter
- Krishnendu Adhikari as Rudra Sen: Saraswati's another elder paternal uncle.
- Nabonita Dey as Namita Sen, Rudra's wife
- Payel Deb as Ganga: Rudra's daughter
- Ananda Chowdhuri as Dipankar: Ganga's husband
- Judhajit Banerjee as Chunilal Sen: Saraswati's father
- Mayna Banerjee as Parbati Sen: Saraswati's mother
- Debjoy Mallick as Prabal Sen: Saraswati's younger paternal uncle
- Samata Das as Anu Sen: Prabal's wife
- Sagnik Koley as Pratik Sen: Prabal's son
- Biman Chakraborty as Bhima
- Swastika Ghosh as Bubli: Rohit's younger sister
- Diganta Saha as Poltu, Rohit's best friend
- Pritam Banerjee as Ahir;Jamuna love interest
- Arunava Dutta as Bhaskar Bhaduri, Mala's brother, Sudip's brother in-law
- Pratyush Kumar Bandyopadhyay as Anik (Poltu's Fake Friend)
