= Nammane Yuvarani =

Indian TV series

- Genre: Drama
- Written by: Jaya Alva
- Directed by: Girish Sathish Krishnan Samprathivi
- Starring: Raghu N.; Kavya Mahadev; Deepak Gowda; Ankita Amar
- Opening theme: Akkareya Olava Gini Nammane Yuvarani
- Country of origin: India
- Original language: Kannada
- No. of episodes: 1,085

Production
- Producer: Prakash
- Camera setup: Multi-camera
- Running time: 6:30 PM
- Production company: Jaimatha Combines

Original release
- Network: Colors Kannada
- Release: 14 January 2019 – 24 September 2022

Nammane Yuvarani was an Indian Kannada language television drama that premiered on Colors Kannada and digitally streams on Voot. The show premiered on 14 January 2019. It has been titled as the Best Serial in 2020

Nammane Yuvarani is the story which reveals the amount of trust two brothers, Saketh and Aniket and their childhood friend, Meera share with each other. Each one of them is ready to sacrifice their lives for each other. The sacrifices made by Meera to protect the house from Saketh's wife Ahalya's evil plans, ever growing and eternal love between Aniket and Meera and the family bonding of Rajgurus forms the rest of the story.

== Plot ==
Nammane Yuvarani (Our House Queen) is the story of two daughters -in - law – Meera and Ahalya. The story opens with the welcoming ceremony of Aniketh, son of the Rajguru family who has come from London after completing his studies in business. Saketh, Aniketh and Pranam are three brothers who have lost their parents and other family members during their childhood. They are taken care of by their grandfather, Vasudhendra Rajguru and a cook named Shambhavi who has a daughter, Meera who resides at the Rajguru. The first few episodes deal with selecting a bride for Saketh's marriage. After selection, Ahalya and Saketh's marriage is fixed. At the wedding place, Meera and Aniketh are shocked to hear that Ahalya had married someone beforehand (later it was known to be Rajath) and share this with Saketh. Saketh shocks everyone by telling that he knows this information and the marriage takes place without any constraints. Having created a ruckus in the hall, Meera and Aniketh decide to apologise to Ahalya. While it's Meera's turn, she learns from Ahalya herself that Ahalya has come to the house with evil intentions. Shocked, Meera tries to confront others, but all in vain.

Meera tries to expose Ahalya's misdeeds before the family but before she could do so, Ahalya comes up with plans. Although Meera is the daughter of a cook, she mingles with the family so much that Aniketh falls in love with her. Ahalya realises that Meera is an obstacle to her goal and decides to marry her off to Prateek who is Meera's college friend and teaches her Maths which Aniketh does not like. Everyone is happy at Meera's wedding proposal except Saketh and Aniketh because they know how Aniketh is madly in love with her. Saketh asks Aniketh to propose to Meera even after her marriage is fixed, but Aniketh does not want to break the marriage. On the wedding day, Ahalya reveals to Meera that her intention is to remove Meera from the house and then destroy the family for some reason later known in the story. With the help of Saketh's friend, Mayuri, Meera comes up with a plan to marry Aniketh and keep a close eye on Ahalya. Meera reveals that she loves Aniketh and would only marry him. Happy, Saketh and Aniketh also support her decision and the marriage happens. Still, Meera does not realise that Aniketh loved her beforehand.

After a few days of Anira's marriage, Aniketh reveals Meera that he loved her before marriage with a romantic proposal in the temple, as he could not resist Shambhavi's torture to Meera for having married above her status. Shocked, Meera slowly falls in love with him. It is at this point of time, Shambhavi and Ahalya get to know about Meera's false claims at the wedding. But Aniketh completely misunderstands the situation and feels that Shambhavi is torturing Meera for her status and not for the lie she omitted. While Meera apologises to Aniketh who did not know the truth yet, she feels reassured that Aniketh has forgiven her. For the next few episodes, Aniketh reveals in front of all the family members that he loved Meera before marriage as well. Shambhavi and Meera unite. Prateek, with the help of Ahalya tries to create a scene and break the strong tie between Meera and Aniketh, but later is exposed when he pulls Meera's mangalsutra from her neck. Aniketh and Meera remarry.

While Ahalya tries to carry on her sinister plans, Namratha, her sister, gets to know all her intentions. She pleads with her not to do so but all in vain. Chandrakantha (Ahalya's younger father) is exposed with the help of Ahalya for having played a major role in Meera and Aniketh kidney transplant.

When Ahalya reveals her vengeance's reason (Rajguru family is responsible for her father's life imprisonment), Namratha feels sorry and joins her evil ploy. Ahalya reveals to Meera that Aniketh still believes Meera loved him before marriage and Meera is dumbstruck when she observes his activities. Saketh overhears this conversation. With the help of Saketh, Meera decides to speak out the truth to Aniketh and does so on a date. Aniketh lashes out at her but they decide to live as if nothing has happened in front of the family. On Meera's birthday, Meera in her intoxicated state, asks Aniketh why he had a sudden hatred for her for a few days. Aniketh's heart melts and he forgives Meera. But Ahalya and Namratha try to show how Ani and Meera lived life fakingly through a puppet show, which enrages Saketh as he feels they played with his emotions. After apologising, Meera, Saketh and Aniketh reunite as before with help of Ahalya. While Ahalya is happy, Namratha is not. Ahalya reveals to Namratha that this would suppress the suspicion Meera had on her and she would realise that Ahalya has changed as a part of their plan.

As designed, Meera starts to remove her suspicion on Ahalya, but not for many days. By this time, Saketh and Aniketh are also suspecting Ahalya. To clear their confusions, they confront Ahalya's childhood teacher, neighbours but all in vain. Ahalya brings Rammana and falsely designs him as her father. While Lakshmi (Ahalya's mother) is reluctant to approve him as her husband, Ahalya forces her to do so. But again she is exposed with the help of Meera in front of the family. Aniketh's suspicion on Ahalya increases after a couple of events in the story and he decides to follow Ahalya to a remote place. But, much to his shock, he is hit hard with a stick by Ahalya. Having not returned, Meera and Saketh are disappointed. Ahalya reveals that Aniketh is no more and they should perform his last rituals. Meera breaks all the rituals and Aniketh makes his entry. Ahalya is dumbstruck as it is not only Meera, but Aniketh too who are sure of her evil intentions.

Ani repeatedly gives threats to Ahalya to stop her activities. Ahalya makes a smart plan and reveals in front of the family that the person is disguised as Aniketh but is not himself. Dumbstruck, Meera confronts him at a date and clears all her confusions when she sees the tattoo made on his chest at the date specially for her a few days after their marriage in a fair. Upon asking the reason for his sudden disappearance for some days, he reveals that he has learnt of Ahalya's evil ploy. Both Ani and Meera are thrilled as they are now together to expose her. Ahalya gets to know the truth that Meera has learnt that her Aniketh is the Aniketh beforehand and no one has disguised him. Namratha slowly changes and turns good. After successfully handing Pranam and Shambhavi to Chandrakanth as a case of kidnap, Ahalya threatens Ani to handover the house papers. After getting the house papers, she reveals her intentions herself, how her family had to live because of the Rajguru family which is entirely a misunderstanding, and mocks Meera for not being able to protect her family. But she is shocked to hear from Saketh that the house papers were fake. Meera reveals that Pranam and Shambhavi are safe because of the help of Agastya (from Nannarasi Radhe). Ahalya is imprisoned.

Ani feels bad for having played with Saketh by choosing Ahalya as a perfect bride for him in the first episodes of the story. But Meera and Saketh reassure him. Ahalya reveals that she is pregnant at the jail and so is bailed with an emotional reunion with her father, Sankar Murthy. Meera tries her best to bring back Ahalya, because she feels that she might have changed but she goes into a coma after an accident. Changed, Ahalya now brings back Meera's life. At the Ganesh Chaturthi celebration, Ahalya reveals that she can't keep her child away from a good family and so asks Meera to bring up her child. After a couple of episodes, Ahalya learns that she was only a pawn to her father and all those events she had thought of were not true. She thinks of all the evil ploys she did at the Rajguru house. While Sankar Murthy tries to kill Ahalya's unborn child, Meera protects Ahalya and brings her home back. Saketh forgives Ahalya after the family members assure him. The entire family reunites.

Later in the story, we are introduced to Kalpana (an enemy of the Rajguru family) who creates problems for the family and even buys their house. With the help of Varudhini, the Rajguru family is able to get their house back. Ani and Meera perform a ritual for bearing a child, but when Ani sees Meera so thrilled for a baby, he thinks of her possibility of not bearing a child due to problems. But after Sridevi's blessings at a temple, Ani gets a call from a nurse, revealing Meera whose baby is healthy. Aniketh and Meera are thrilled and regularly get appointments with the doctor. Once, Kalpana threatens them and after they go for a check up they do not return. This brings an end to their character.

Ahalya and others are shocked to hear this. Ardent prayers are made for their coming back and seven years are spent in finding them but all in vain. The show features a leap of seven years now.

Seven years later, Pranam has grown up. While finding Ani and Meera, the family confronts a girl named Ganga. Immediately Pranam falls in love with her, proposes to her and the marriage takes place after a lot of ruckus created by Kalpana and Navya. Later, Kalpana creates problems which makes the family members angry with Ganga. Pranam and Ganga now are separated. Ganga goes to her village where she encounters another enemy, Raje Gowda. With help of Ahalya, Ganga and Pranam reunite and Ganga confesses her love to Pranam. Annoyed, Pranam admonishes Ganga for manipulating the family into believing that they consummated their marriage. However, Ganga's grandmother notices him shouting at her. After a couple of episodes, problems arise where Pranam begins to suspect and dislike Ganga, creating a rift between them. Ganga's humiliation makes her come at a decision to leave the house. After efforts by Ahalya and Saketh, both of them reunite. Ganga comes with a plan to trap Kalpana by disguising herself at her home. She reveals to Kalpana that she has broken her ties with the Rajguru family and watches her intentions.

After arresting Kalpana, the Rajgurus hire a detective to search her home. They are startled to find Meera's diary which makes Saketh emotional. They get a clue that their baby is alive and hire a detective in search of her. Will the Rajgurus finally unite with the long-lost Meera, Aniket and their baby?

With help of Arun, Saketh is able to retrieve his daughter, Kinnari. His daughter comes to Rajguru family and Ahalya is overwhelmed to find her child back. Kinnari is not able to develop a good relation with her father and stays away from him. Ahalya even keeps her child away from Saketh in many episodes.

In a series of events, Meera's diary is burnt to ashes, while Ganga suspects that it has been done by someone knowingly. Kinnari gets closer to his father, Saketh with help of Pranam. Ganga makes her wish to bail out Kalpana from the prison to Saketh, and he follows her wish. In a series of events, Kalpana absconds her house far. Ganga notices Kinnari's photograph with her grandfather, Shankar Murthy (Ahalya's father) and confronts Ahalya. Later, Rajgurus find a threatening letter about the danger on Kinnari. Ahalya decides to send her to boarding school back. As Ganga takes her to the school, she is surprised to know that Kinnari was already in the school before hand. What is Ahalya hiding from the family about Kinnari's past?

The story introduces a new character, Chinni, who is shown in utmost poverty. While she lands at the Rajguru house at Gowri Ganesh Puja, she requests the family to provide her shelter. In the initial days, she reminds the family of Meera, as she imitates all her activities. Is Chinni related to Meera? In the later series of events, it is revealed that Ahalya is the master mind behind Aniketh and Meera's disconnection with the family for many years. She is also the murderer of Kalpana, which is revealed by Navya when she narrates the story to the Rajgurus. Ganga and Pranam visit Chinni's ashram and get to know that she is none other than Aniketh and Meera's daughter. Overwhelmed, they announce the family. Also, Saketh shares a good news that he has found Aniket and Meera.

Dumbstruck Ahalya, now decides to show her climax to the family. While Saketh goes to an isolated house where Meera and Aniketh live, he is held at gunpoint by Chandrakanth. In a shocking turn of events, he holds the gun on Chandrakanth's forehead and asks him to help him fool Ahalya. The Rajgurus reach a place where Ahalya celebrates her victory. Soon, Chandrakanth arrives with Saketh and his plan. Shambhavi and Lakshmi shoot Ahalya as a punishment to her misdeeds and for sending Aniketh and Meera far from them for many years. Ahalya gloats her victory before the dead Saketh, Aniketh and Meera, but it was a plan of Saketh. Shooted Ahalya, gets to know that Saketh had saved Aniketh and Meera, and then breathes her last. While the dead body of Ahalya is taken for cremation, Chandrakanth and Lakshmi are arrested.

The Rajguru family welcomes Aniketh and Meera back home after many years of grief and the title track of Nammane Yuvarani tunes with the photo album of the Rajguru family.

== Cast ==
=== Main ===
- Deepak Gowda as Aniketh Rajguru – Shanthala's son, Saketh and Pranam's brother, Meera's husband, Vasudendra's grandson, Shambhavi's son-in-law
- Ankita Amar as Meera Rajguru – Aniketh's wife, Shanthala's daughter-in-law, Shambhavi's daughter
- Raghu N. as Saketh Rajguru – Shanthala's son, Aniketh and Pranam's brother, Ahalya's husband, Vasudendra's grandson, Lakshmi's son-in-law
- Kavya Mahadev as Ahalya Rajguru – Saketh's wife, Lakshmi's daughter Shanthala's daughter-in-law
- Snehieth Gowda as Pranam Rajguru (2022–present) - Saketh & Aniket's younger brother, Ganga's husband
- Khushi as Ganga - Pranam's wife, Shantala's daughter-in-law

=== Recurring ===
- Sandeep Ashok as Vasudendra Rajguru – Head of Rajguru family, Aniketh and Saketh's grandfather
- Jayanth as Pranam Rajguru – Saketh and Aniketh's younger brother, Vasudendra's grandson
- Jyothi Kiran as Shambavi – Meera's mother, Aniketh's mother-in-law
- Sahana Ravindra as Lakshmi – Ahalya and Namratha's mother, Saketh's mother-in-law
- Prakruthi Prasad / Latha Girish Namratha – Ahalya's sister, Lakshmi's daughter
- Swathi as Shanthala Rajguru – Saketh, Aniketh and Pranam's mother, Vasudendra's daughter in law
- Ravi Prasad as Shankar Murthy – Lakshmi's husband, Ahalya and Namratha's father, enemy of Rajguru family
- Nishitha Gowda as Kalpana – Second wife of Shankar Murthy, Enemy of Rajguru family
- Aditi Prabhudeva
- Mayuri Kyatari

== Production ==
In January 2020, the show completed 300 episode. On 16 June 2022, the show successfully completed 1000 episodes.

=== Crossover episodes ===
In January 2020, a special crossover episode of Nammane Yuvarani and Mithuna Raashi announced.

In May 2021, Nammane Yuvarani saw some special episodes with Lahari from Hoo Male and Agastya from Nannarasi Radhe.

In October 2020, the team Lakshmi Baramma, nearly after many months of series end, teamed up with Nammane Yuvarani for a special episode.

In November 2021, nearly after three years of ending of Kulavadhu, the serial saw a "Mahasangama" episode with them.

On 19 December 2022, a two hour long episode welcoming the new serial Doresani titled "Nammane Doresani" was telecasted. It focused on welcoming characters of the new serial and Ahalya's baby shower ending with confirmation of Meera and Aniketh's healthy baby.

Meera's character had a crossover with Kannada TV series Bhagyalakshmi serial in July 2023, months after the serial getting off air.

=== Reception ===
In September 2019, the show occupied fifth position in BARC ratings.

== Awards and nominations ==
Year	Award	Category	Recipient	Result
2019	6th Anubanda Awards	Jana Mechhida Samsara	Nammane Yuvarani	Nominated
2019	6th Anubanda Awards	Jana Mecchida Nayaki	Ankita Amar (Meera)	Won
2019	6th Anubanda Awards	Jana Mecchida Nayaka	Deepak Gowda (Aniketh)	Nominated
2019	6th Anubanda Awards	Jana Mecchida Jodi	Deepak Gowda and Ankita Amar	Won
2019	6th Anubanda Awards	Mane Mecchida Amma	Jyoti Kiran (Shambhavi)	Nominated
2019	6th Anubanda Awards	Jana Mecchida Manthare	Kavya Mahadev (Ahalya)	Nominated
2019	6th Anubanda Awards	Mane Mechhida Aliya	Raghu N (Saketh)	Won
2020	7th Anubandha Awards	Jana Mecchida Samsara	Nammane Yuvarani	Won
2020	7th Anubandha Awards	Jana Mecchida Nayaki	Ankita Amar (Meera)	Nominated
2020	7th Anubandha Awards	Jana Mecchida Nayaka	Deepak Gowda (Aniketh)	Nominated
2020	7th Anubandha Awards	Mane Mecchida Sahodara - Male	Raghu N (Saketh)	Nominated
2020	7th Anubandha Awards	Jana Mecchida Style Icon -Female	Kavya Mahadev (Ahalya)	Nominated
2020	7th Anubandha Awards	Jana Mecchide Style Icon - Male	Deepak Gowda (Aniketh)	Won
2020	7th Anubandha Awards	Jana Mecchida Youth Icon	Ankita Amar	Nominated
2020	7th Anubandha Awards	Jana Mecchida Jodi	Deepak Gowda and Ankita Amar (Aniketh & Meera)	Won
2020	7th Anubandha Awards	Jana Mecchida Mantare	Kavya Mahadev (Ahalya)	Won
2020	7th Anubandha Awards	Mane Mecchida Atte	Jyoti Kiran (Shambhavi)	Won
2020	7th Anubandha Awards	Mane Mecchida Magalu	Ankita Amar (Meera)	Nominated
2020	7th Anubandha Awards	Mane Mecchida Maga	Deepak Gowda (Aniketh)	Nominated
2020	7th Anubandha Awards	Mane Mecchida Sahodari	Prakruthi Prasad (Namratha)	Nominated
2021	8th Anubanda Awards	Jana Mechhida Samsara	Nammane Yuvarani	Nominated
2021	8th Anubanda Awards	Jana Mecchida Nayaki	Ankita Amar (Meera)	Nominated
2021	8th Anubanda Awards	Jana Mecchida Nayaka	Deepak Gowda (Aniketh)	Nominated
2021	8th Anubanda Awards	Jana Mecchida Jodi	Deepak Gowda and Ankita Amar	Nominated
2021	8th Anubanda Awards	Mane Mecchida Amma	Jyoti Kiran (Shambhavi)	Nominated
2021	8th Anubanda Awards	Jana Mecchida Manthare	Kavya Mahadev (Ahalya)	Won
2021	8th Anubanda Awards	Mane Mechhida Atte	Jyoti Kiran (Shambhavi)	Nominated
2021	8th Anubanda Awards	Mane Mecchida Maga	Deepak Gowda (Aniketh)	Nominated
2021	8th Anubanda Awards	Mane Mecchida Magalu	Ankita Amar (Meera)	Won
2021	8th Anubanda Awards	Mane Mecchida Sahodara - Male	Raghu N (Saketh)	Won
2021	8th Anubanda Awards	Mane Mecchida Heria	Ashok (Vasudhendra Rajguru)	Won
2021	8th Anubanda Awards	Jana Mecchida Style Icon - Female	Kavya Mahadev (Ahalya)	Nominated
2021	8th Anubanda Awards	Jana Mechhida Style Icon - Male	Deepak Gowda (Aniketh)	Won
