= Tumpa Autowali =

2022 Indian television series

- Genre: Drama; Romance
- Created by: Anindya Saha
- Based on: Mithuna Raashi
- Written by: NK. Salil
- Starring: Dona Bhowmik; Sayan Bose
- Theme music composer: Anindya Chattopadhyay
- Opening theme: "Ami Tumpa Autowali Pounche Deboi Timely"
- Composer: Poushali Banerjee
- Country of origin: India
- Original language: Bengali
- No. of seasons: 1
- No. of episodes: 684

Production
- Producer: Anindya Saha
- Production location: Kolkata
- Camera setup: Multi-camera
- Running time: 22 minutes
- Production company: Crystal Dreams Production Company

Original release
- Network: Colors Bangla
- Release: 16 May 2022 – 31 March 2024

Tumpa Autowali (transl. The Lady Auto Driver Tumpa) is a Bengali daily soap which aired on Colors Bangla from 16 May 2022. It digitally streamed on Voot. The show is produced by Anindya Saha under the banner of Crystal Dreams Production Company and stars Dona Bhowmik and Sayan Bose in leading roles. It is an official remake of Colors Kannada show Mithuna Raashi.

== Plot ==
An independent girl Annapurna Chowdhury "Tumpa Autowali" drives an auto-rickshaw because of family problems, hence supporting them financially. However, life takes a turn when she reluctantly marries an arrogant businessman named Abir.

== Cast ==
=== Main ===
- Dona Bhowmik as Annapurna "Tumpa" Chowdhury – An auto driver
- Sayan Bose as Abir – The owner of a cab company
- Sairity Banerjee as Pampa
- Sayan Karmakar as Pampa's lover
- Aniruddha Gupta as Arka

=== Recurring ===
- Dolon Roy as Girija
- Kaushik Banerjee as Abir's grandfather
- Debika Mitra as Abir's grandmother
- Joyjit Banerjee as Abir's uncle
- Anisha Chowdhury as Neha

== Adaptations ==
Language	Title	Original release	Network(s)	Last aired	Notes
Kannada	Mithuna Raashi ಮಿಥುನ ರಾಶಿ	28 January 2019	Colors Kannada	27 February 2022	Original
Marathi	Jeev Majha Guntala जीव माझा गुंतला	21 June 2021	Colors Marathi	16 September 2023	Remake
Bengali	Tumpa Autowali টুম্পা অটোওয়ালি	16 May 2022	Colors Bangla	31 March 2024	Remake
