= Ibbani Tabbida Ileyali =

- Directed by: Chandrajith Belliappa
- Written by: Chandrajith Belliappa
- Produced by: G. S. Gupta; Rakshit Shetty; Shashi Kumar P (Executive Producer); Rajesh S Konanur (Line Producer)
- Starring: Vihan Gowda; Ankita Amar; Mayuri Nataraja; Girija Shettar; Shankar Murthy S.R; Salmin Sheriff
- Cinematography: Srivathsan Selvarajan
- Edited by: Rakshith Kaup
- Music by: Gagan Baderia
- Production company: Paramvah Studios
- Distributed by: KRG Studios
- Release date: 5 September 2024
- Running time: 160 mins
- Country: India
- Language: Kannada

Ibbani Tabbida Ileyali (lit. 'On the dew embraced earth') is a 2024 Indian Kannada-language romance film written and directed by Chandrajith Belliappa. Produced by Rakshit Shetty under Paramvah Studios, it stars Vihan Gowda, Ankita Amar, Mayuri Nataraja and Girija Shettar, Shankar Murthy S.R, Salmin Sheriff, Rakshit Kaup, Davana Dhanraj, Aditya B Pujar, Anirudh Bhat, Damini Dhanraj .The cinematography of the film is handled by Srivathsan Selvarajan, editing by Rakshith Kaup and music by Gagan Baderia. The film's title is based on a song from Rashmi (1994).

The film is based on a blog post written by Director Chandrajith Belliappa from over a decade ago.

The film was theatrically released on 5 September 2024. The film received positive reviews from critics and audience.

== Cast ==
- Vihan Gowda as Siddharth Ashok aka Sid
- Ankita Amar as Anahita Madhumita Banarjee
- Mayuri Nataraja as Radha
- Girija Shettar as Madhumita
- Shankar Murthy S. R. as Farhan
- Salman Sheriff as Ashok Nachchappa
- Kiran Raj K as doctor (cameo)
- Vickypedia as waiter (cameo)
- Nagarjuna Sharma as cricketer (cameo)
- Chandrajit Belliappa as cricketer (cameo)

== Production ==
The film was announced in August 2022. Principal photography commenced in September 2022. Filming was wrapped in November 2023.

== Music ==
Ibbani Tabbida Ileyali

Soundtrack album by Gagan Baderiya
- Released: 2024
- Recorded: 2023
- Genre: Feature film soundtrack
- Length: 32:58
- Label: Paramvah Music

Gagan Baderia has composed the music and background score for the film. The film has following tracks:

Track listing
No.	Title	Lyrics	Singer(s)	Length
1.	"Oh Anahita"	Chandrajith Belliappa	Kapil Kapilan	5:32
2.	"Radhe"	Chandrajith Belliappa	Srilakshmi Belmannu	4:45
3.	"Taare Nihaare"	Nagarjun Sharma	Armaan Malik	4:59
4.	"Helu Gelathi"	Nagarjun Sharma	Charan Raj	3:56
5.	"Sadaa Neene"	Nagarjun Sharma	Arun Kamath	3:46
6.	"Helu Gelathi - Lo-Fi Version"		Charan Raj, Specro X Sketch	3:12
7.	"Oh Anahita - Lo-Fi Version"		Kapil Kapilan, Specro X Sketch	3:59
8.	"Soul of Ibbani Tabbida Ileyali"		Gagan Baderiya	2:49
Total length:				32:58

== Release ==
The film was theatrically released on 5 September 2024 with premiers held the day before in select cities of Karnataka.

== Reception ==
The movie generally received positive reviews with praise towards direction, cinematography, music and the acting of the leads.

Pranati A S of Deccan Herald gave it 3 1/2 out of five stars and wrote "A feel good romance made of polaroid pictures, poetry, wine, beautiful visuals and music — all in the backdrop of the Goan monsoon and Bengaluru’s aesthetics." She also noticed that it took inspiration from O. Henry’s The Last Leaf and Erich Segal’s Love Story. Prathibha Joy of OTTplay rated the film three-and-a-half out of five stars and described "Ibbani Tabbida Ileyali is for die-hard romantics and those with a soft spot for love stories with praise towards direction, cinematography, music and the acting of the leads. Shashiprasad SM from Times Now reviewed and wrote "Ibbani Tabbida Ileyali is a refined tale of love and magic that, like fine wine, is best savoured slowly. This is a film to be enjoyed sip by sip, not rushed."

In his review for The Hindu, Vivek M. V. wrote "Ibbani Tabidda Ileyali, based on a story written by Chandrajith on his blog long ago, feels like reading a book with a constant presence of voice-overs and characters narrating their feelings through poems." Sunayana Suresh of The South First rated the movie 3.5 out of 5 stars and "A heartwarming tale of love, care, and self-discovery that is a treat to the senses." and added the movie to be a tribute to Geethanjali by Mani Ratnam, where Girija Shettar starred as the lead. A Sharadhaa of Cinema Express in her review wrote "The tale has been explored in various forms across cinema, and the narrative around medical complications might seem familiar, but what sets the film apart is the way it reverberates with the quiet pain of unspoken emotions." Sridevi S from The Times of India rated the movie 3 out of 5 stars and wrote "While the story in itself is nothing new, it is the treatment to screenplay and story-telling that makes Ibbani an interesting watch. It is a slow-burner love story enriched by strong performances and genuine moments of emotional resonance".

Film critic CinephileIndia in his YouTube review mentioned that this movie is something that needs to be enjoyed like a morning cup of filter coffee, one sip at a time, while lauding the simple story, human-like relatable characters, and astounding cinematography.

== Accolades ==
At the 13th South Indian International Movie Awards (SIIMA), the movie received nominations under seven categories including Best Music Director (Gagan Baderia), Best Lyric Writer (Chandrajith Belliappa), Best Playback Singer - Female (Srilakshmi Belmannu), Best Singer - Male (Kapil Kapilan), Best Debutant Actor - Female (Ankita Amar), Best Debutant Director (Chandrajith Belliappa), Best Cinematographer (Srivathsan Selvarajan).

Ankita Amar won the award for Best Debutant Actor - Female and Srivathsan Selvarajan won the award for the Best Cinematographer.
