= Hariprriya filmography =

Filmography article

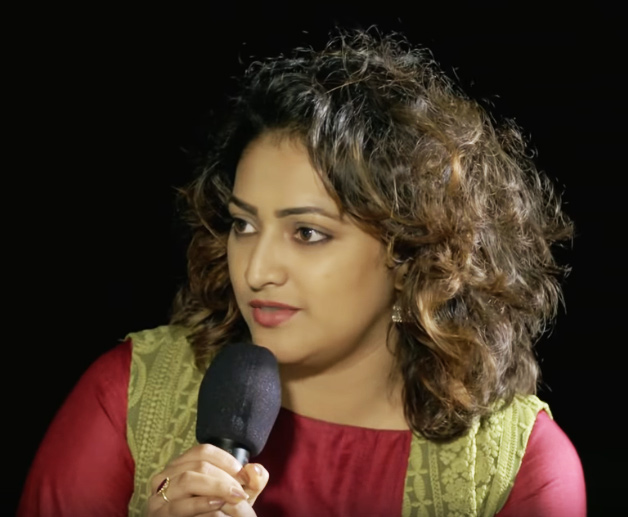
Hariprriya in 2019

Hariprriya is an Indian actress and model who mostly works in Kannada films, in addition to a few Telugu, Tamil and Malayalam films. She gained wide acclaim for her role in Ugramm which fetched her a lot of appreciation and awards and also for her performances in Ranna, Ricky, Neerdose, Bharjari, Samhaara, Jai Simha, Bell Bottom, Soojidara and D/O Parvathamma.

== Kannada films ==
Key
†	Denotes films that have not yet been released

Year	Title	Role	Notes	Ref
2008	Manasugula Mathu Madhura	Amaravathi	Kannada debut	
2008	Vasanthakala	Meghana		
2009	Ee Sambhashane	Ramya		
2009	Male Barali Manju Irali	Nayana		
2009	Kallara Santhe	Roopa	Nominated- Filmfare Award for Best Actress - Kannada	
2010	Cheluveye Ninne Nodalu	Sahana		
2012	Kiladi Kitty	Sindhu		
2012	Sagar	Priyanka		
2012	Super Shastri	Soumya		
2014	Ugramm	Nitya	Nominated- Filmfare Award for Best Actress-Kannada	
2015	Ranna	Indira		
2015	Bullet Basya	Kaveri		
2016	Ricky	Radha		
2016	Bhale Jodi	Kavya	Special appearance	
2016	Ranatantra	Swarna		
2016	Neer Dose	Kumudha	Nominated- Filmfare Award for Best Actress - Kannada	
2017	Bharjari	Haasini		
2017	Anjaniputra	Herself	Special Appearance in song "1234 Shille Hodi"	
2018	Kanaka	Sampige		
2018	Samhaara	Nandini / Anjali / Chitrangadha (Note: Hariprriya played a single character with two or more names.)		
2018	Life Jothe Ondh Selfie	Rashmi (Rosh)		
2019	Bell Bottom	Kusuma		
2019	Soojidara	Padmashree		
2019	D/O Parvathamma	Vaidhei	25th Kannada Film	
2019	Kurukshetra	Maaye		
2019	Ellidde Illi Tanaka	Nandini		
2019	Kannad Gothilla	Shruthi Chakravarthy		
2019	Katha Sangama	Radha		
2020	Bicchugatti: Chapter 1 − Dalvayi Dange	Siddhambe		
2022	Petromax	Meenakshi		
2023	Yadha Yadha Hi	Priyanka Shetty		
2025	Thayi Kasthur Gandhi	Kasturba Gandhi	Direct To Digital Release	
2025	Amruthamathi	Amruthamathi		
2025	Happy Ending †	TBA	Completed	
2025	Lagaam †	TBA	Filming	

== Other language films ==
Year	Title	Role	Language	Notes	Ref
2007	Badi	Priya	Tulu	Credited as Shrutipriya, Debut Tulu movie	
2010	Kanagavel Kaaka	Sandhya	Tamil	Tamil debut	
2010	Thakita Thakita	Chandana	Telugu	Telugu debut	.
2010	Vallakottai	Anjali	Tamil		
2011	Muran	Lavanya	Tamil		
2011	Pilla Zamindar	Sindhu	Telugu		
2012	Thiruvambadi Thamban	Anjali Narayanan	Malayalam	Malayalam Debut	
2013	Abbai Class Ammai Mass	Neeru	Telugu		
2014	Ee Varsham Sakshiga	Seetha Mahalakshmi	Telugu		
2014	Galata	Andaal	Telugu		
2018	Jai Simha	Manga	Telugu		
2022	Naan Mirugamaai Maara	Aanandhi	Tamil		
2023	Ala Ila Ela	Priya	Telugu	Bilingual film	
2024	Oru Thee	Priya	Tamil	Bilingual film	

== Television ==
Year	Program	Role	Channel	Notes	Ref(s)
2019	Nayaki	Narrator	Udaya TV	Introducing Characters	
2020	Sangarsha	Goddess Devi	Star Suvarna	Navaratri Special Episodes, Cameo Appearance	
2021	Dance Dance	Judge	Star Suvarna		
2024	Aase	Ahana Agnihotra	Star Suvarna	Cameo Appearance	

== Music videos ==
Year	Title	Artist	Notes	Ref.
2019	"Kalidaasa Kannada Meshtru"	Gurukiran	Promotional song for Kalidasa Kannada Meshtru	

== See also ==
- List of Indian film actresses
