= Bell Bottom =

Bell Bottom may refer to:

- Bell-bottoms, a style of trousers
- Bell Bottom (2019 film), an Indian Kannada-language crime comedy film
- Bell Bottom (2021 film), an Indian Hindi-language action thriller film
