= Tony (2013 film) =

- Promotional poster of the film
- Tony
- Directed by: Jayatheertha
- Written by: Jayatheertha
- Produced by: G. V. Indrakumar; Srinagar Kitty
- Starring: Srinagar Kitty; Dilip Raj; Aindrita Ray
- Cinematography: Gnanamurthy
- Edited by: K. M. Prakash
- Music by: Sadhu Kokila
- Production company: Sky Studios
- Release date: 9 August 2013 (India)
- Country: India
- Language: Kannada

Tony is a 2013 Kannada-language thriller film directed by Jayatheertha. The film stars Srinagar Kitty and Aindrita Ray in lead roles. The soundtrack and background score were composed by Sadhu Kokila, while the cinematography was handled by Gnanamurthy.

The film was shot extensively around Bangkok. One of the sub plot of the movie was based on the 1886 short story How Much Land Does a Man Need? by Leo Tolstoy.

== Plot ==
Keshava alias Tony is a young money-minded man who gets caught in the web of a crime ring, which promises him money for carrying out their instructions. A mysterious caller tells him that he has kidnapped Pammi and taken away all identifications from him. The caller tells Tony to complete all his assigned tasks within 6:00 pm in exchange for Pammi's life.

Tony does all the assigned tasks and finally meets Pammi. Tony finally meets the caller, who reveals himself as a cop. The cop reveals that he and Inspector Ashok had made Tony to complete the tasks, which were actually police operations to capture the crime ring.

Tony is relieved from the fact that he was not working in the crime ring, where the cop advises to find a suitable job and tells that money should be earned for sufficient needs and nobody should become greedy for money.

== Cast ==
- Srinagar Kitty as Keshava alias Tony
- Dilip Raj
- Aindrita Ray as Pammi
- Sharath Lohitashwa
- Preeti Jhangiani
- Swayamwara Chandru
- Suchendra Prasad as Inspector Ashok
- Veena Sundar
- Harish Rayappa
- P. Ravi Shankar as unknown caller

== Production ==
=== Development ===
Director Jayatheertha, who made a successful previous film titled, Olave Mandara, announced his next feature film and titled it as Tony, a name which was already used in the Ambareesh - Lakshmi starrer in the 1981s.

=== Promotion ===
Tony was widely promoted all across the Karnataka State. The film team also promoted in one of the most popular television shows, Bigg Boss hosted by actor Sudeep. The film is extensively shot in Bangalore, Mysore, Bangkok among other places. The film was also made news for spending big bucks for songs. Singer Raghu Dixit who crooned for a number in the film, performed at the sets. Sudeep also enthralled the audiences by singing a song.

== Soundtrack ==
The music for the film was composed by Sadhu Kokila, with lyrics penned by Yogaraj Bhat, Jayanth Kaikini, Arasu Anthare and Jayatheertha.

=== Track list ===
No.	Title	Lyrics	Singer(s)	Length
1.	"Pakka Paapi"	Yogaraj Bhat	Puneeth Rajkumar
2.	"Andaaje Siguthilla"	Jayanth Kaikini	Sonu Nigam, Sunidhi Chauhan
3.	"Tony Bandanu"		V. Harikrishna
4.	"Naavu Kooguva"		Raghu Dixit
5.	"Tangaaliyalu"		Pragya Patra
6.	"Entele Maavina"		Hemanth Kumar, M. D. Pallavi
7.	"Shiva Shiva Endare"		Hemanth Kumar, M. D. Pallavi
8.	"Kaashige Hogakke"		Hemanth Kumar, M. D. Pallavi
9.	"Nannayya Nee"		Hemanth Kumar, M. D. Pallavi

== Release ==
=== Critical reception ===
The Times of India gave 3.5/5 stars and wrote "After Olave Mandara, which won rave reviews for its story and narration, director Jayatheertha has experimented with a new style. With three different narration tracks, the movie gets difficult to understand at times. It is a movie not for the mass or class but for the thinking class."
