= Ricky (2016 film) =

- Theatrical release poster
- Directed by: Rishab Shetty
- Written by: Rishab Shetty
- Produced by: S. V. Babu
- Starring: Rakshit Shetty; Haripriya
- Narrated by: Sudeep
- Cinematography: Venkatesh Anguraj
- Edited by: N. M. Vishwa
- Music by: Arjun Janya
- Production company: S. V. Productions
- Distributed by: Bahaar Films
- Release date: 22 January 2016
- Running time: 137 minutes
- Country: India
- Language: Kannada

Ricky is a 2016 Indian Kannada-language crime thriller film written and directed by Rishab Shetty in his directorial debut, and produced by S. V. Babu. It stars Rakshit Shetty and Haripriya in the lead roles. The supporting cast features Achyuth Kumar and Ravi Kale. The film deals with the prevalence of naxalism in India, with a love story in the backdrop.

== Plot ==
Radhakrishna "Ricky" (Rakshit Shetty) is engaged to his childhood friend Radha (Haripriya). He leaves to the north for a year for his job and promises her to return as soon as possible. However, when he returns, he cannot find her as she along with her family have disappeared. He searches for her and finds out that she has now become a Naxalite named Seetha. He discovers that she had turned into a Naxalite to avenge the wrongful destruction of her home by the Government and her parents' death. The complications start to affect them both and lead them to dangerous situations.

== Cast ==
- Rakshit Shetty as Radhakrishna "Ricky"
- Haripriya as Radha/Seetha
- Achyuth Kumar
- Ravi Kale
- Pramod Shetty
- Veena Sunder
- Shashikala
- Sadhu Kokila
- Manjunath
- Dinesh Mangaluru
- Raghu Pandeshwar
- Chandrakala Rao
- Rishab Shetty as Radhakrishna's friend

== Production ==
=== Development and casting ===
Rishab Shetty, who had earlier starred in Rakshit Shetty's 2014 film Ulidavaru Kandanthe, turned director for the first time with Ricky. Shetty had conceived the story in 2009 inspired from an incident that occurred in Kundapur near his hometown Kerady in Karnataka, as an aspiring film director. He said, "I was born and brought in Kerady, a place near Kundapura, which is surrounded with mountains. It was a Naxal-affected area and I used to hear several stories from people around me, which formed the backdrop of the story" and added, "I have also explored an incident about Special Economic Zones, which I picked up from a programme by the central government".

Shetty had initially wanted Diganth to play the lead role. However, on watching Rakshit Shetty's 2010 Tughlaq, he decided to have him play the role. He planned to signing Hariprriya after being impressed by her performance in the 2014 film Ugramm. It was revealed in February 2014 that Kishore and Achyuth Kumar were signed to play supporting roles. Ravi Kale was then cast to play a pivotal role as well.

=== Filming ===
"I was shooting for Ranna then and in between preparing for my character in Ricky. I survived on proteins and juices for 30 odd days. I don't believe in being lean and prefer to lead a healthy life. Thankfully, I can easily gain and lose weight, which actually helped to play my role in Bullet Basya, Ricky and Neer Dose, which is my current project. For Ricky, weight was not the issue, but the two shades that I play as Radha and Sita. I had to be lovable as well as stubborn with my voice, expressions and my body language."

— Hariprriya, on her preparation for the film.

It was revealed by the official Twitter handle of the film that shooting commenced on 1 September 2014, also revealing the first look poster of the film. Filming began in Karkala, Udupi district. Majority of the filming took place in Udupi and Dakshina Kannada. Rakshit Shetty confirmed that 90 percent of the filming was completed by 12 October, in a span of 42 days, with a song sequence to be shot in Gujarat. The director revealed that songs and fight sequences were to be shot in Bengaluru. A house worth ₹ 1 million was constructed in the area for filming in Kalavaru village at the Western Ghats region, to resemble the house of an agriculturist that was demolished previously, after orders from a court.

Setting to complete filming in a total of 99 days, a total of 46 days was done in the deep forests of Karkala, in the Udupi district of Karnataka. Additionally, filming took place for four days in Bangalore, nine days in Melkote, and 12 days in areas surrounding the Dal Lake of Srinagar, Jammu and Kashmir. Filming completed in June 2015 after a total of 69 days.

== Soundtrack ==
Ricky

Soundtrack album by Arjun Janya
- Released: 31 December 2015
- Recorded: 2015
- Genre: Feature film soundtrack
- Length: 18:54
- Label: Anand Audio

Arjun Janya composed the film's background and scored for its soundtrack. Lyrics for the soundtrack was penned by K. Kalyan, Kaviraj and Jayant Kaikini. The soundtrack album consists of five tracks. It was released on 31 December 2015 in Bangalore.

No.	Title	Lyrics	Artist(s)	Length
1.	"O Baby"	K. Kalyan	Tippu, Anuradha Bhat	3:12
2.	"Jeeva Neenu"	K. Kalyan	Rajesh Krishnan	4:22
3.	"Harusha Taaladhe"	Kaviraj	Vijay Prakash	4:16
4.	"Malage Malage"	Jayant Kaikini	Karthik, Ankitha Kundu	3:36
5.	"Yele Mareyali"	Jayant Kaikini	Naveen Sajju	3:28
Total length:				18:54

== Release ==
The film was given a "U/A" (Parental Guidance) certificate by the Regional Censor Board in early January 2016. Including a "couple of changes", the makers were asked to mute seven dialogues. Immediately afterwards, the makers, initially on having planned to release the film theatrically on 22 January, decided to release it on 29 January, citing "theatre problems", with many other films releasing on 22 January. However, as initially planned, it was released on 22 January.
