= Jayatheertha =

Indian filmmaker

Jayathirtha
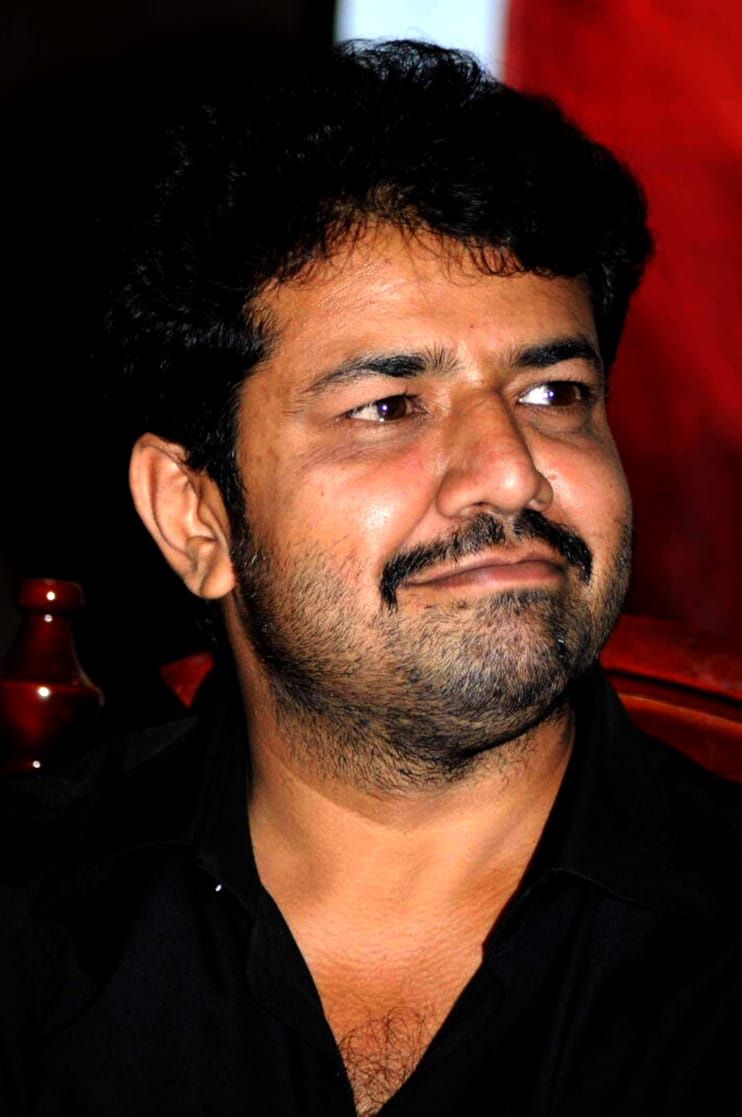
- Born: Bangalore, India
- Occupations: Film director; Theatre director; Production designer
- Known for: Olave Mandara; Tony; Beautiful Manasugalu; Bell Bottom
- Spouse: Poornima H. D.
- Children: 1

Jayathirtha B. V. is an Indian theatre activist, production designer, and filmmaker. He is known for his movies Olave Mandara, Tony, Beautiful Manasugalu, and Bell Bottom.

He is also known for his work as a director and play writer.

== Early life and education ==
Jayathirtha B. V. was born and brought up in Bangalore, Karnataka. A high school dropout due to financial constraints, he started working as a salesman at 17 and took up theatre as a pastime. He trained at Abhinayataranga under the renowned theatre personality A. S. Murthy and later became a teacher in the same institution.

Jayathirtha won several awards for his works in theatre, including the B. V. Karanth Best Stage Reviewer Award (1997) for his critical review of the play, Maranayak.

== Film career ==
=== Beginnings ===
In 2007, he directed a short film called Hasivu (Hunger). The movie won the Best Indian Short Film award at Cinerail Film Festival, Paris.

=== 2011–2013: Directorial debut and breakthrough ===
In 2011, he directed a full-fledged Kannada feature film, Olave Mandara which brought several awards including the 59th Filmfare Awards (Best Director). The sub-plot of Olave Mandara is inspired by the real-life events of Dashrath Manjhi who cut a rocky hill for 22 years to build a road in memory of his wife. Later he directed Tony (2013) which won him the Karnataka State Film Award for Best Screenplay.

=== 2015–2018: Career fluctuations ===
He wrote the screenplay for the 2015 film Endendigu. His next was Bullet Basya (2015) starring Sharan and Haripriya, which opened to mixed reviews owing to its sexist jokes.

He made a comeback with the movie Beautiful Manasugalu (2017), which was based on shocking events that occurred in 2012. The movie won Best Dialogues Award at KAFTA Times of India 2017, the only awards given to technicians in Kannada film industry. His next movie was Vanilla (2018), a murder mystery with a message of social concerns.

=== 2019–present: commercial success and fluctuations ===
Bell Bottom (2019) is a comedy crime thriller, a story of a die-hard fan of detective stories. It became the first Kannada film in 2019 to complete 100 days. It also won the second best commercial film recognition at Bangalore International Film Festival 2020. The movie has won Best Director Award in Critics Choice Film Awards 2020.

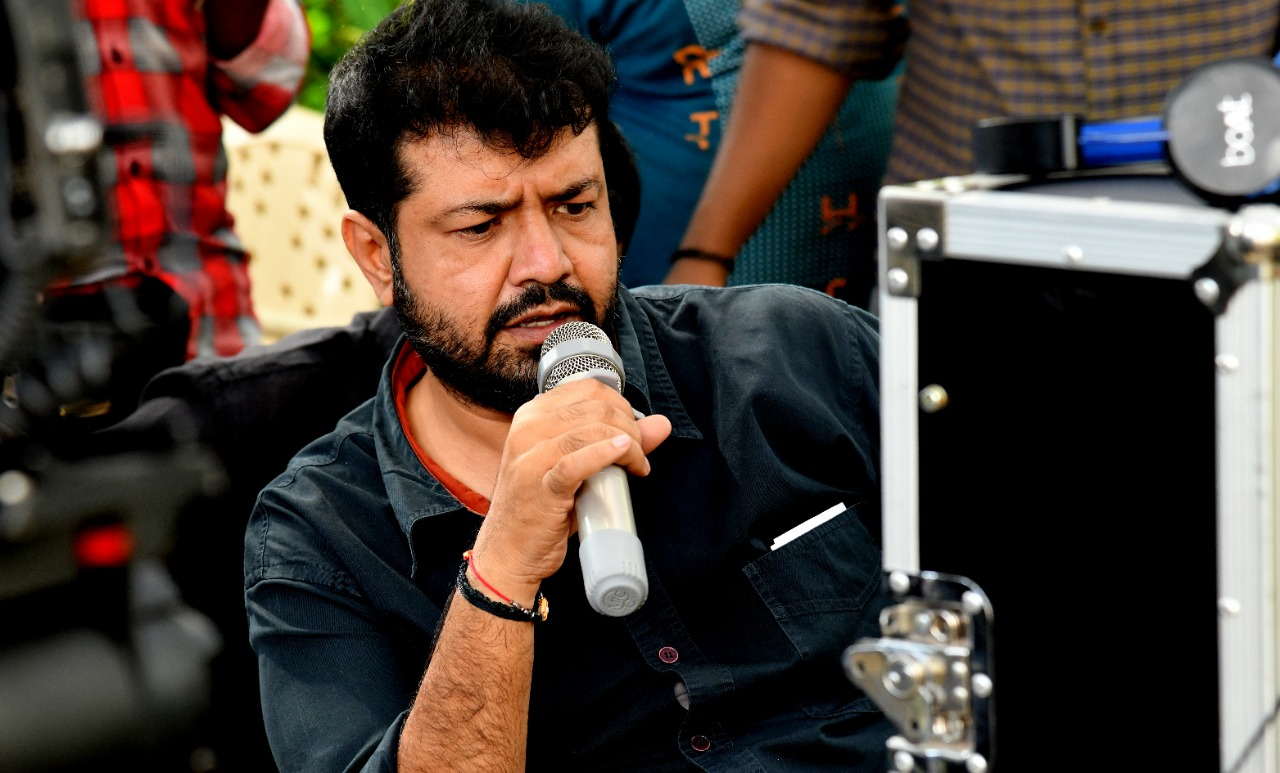
Director Jayathirtha during the shooting of Banaras, on the banks of river Ganga.

In November 2020, It was reported that Jayathirtha along with four other Kannada film directors KM Chaitanya, Shashank (director), Yogaraj Bhat, and Pawan Kumar (director) would team up to make a two-hour film. However it did not materialise. His next directorial was Banaras, starring newcomer Zaid Khan alongside Sonal Monteiro, which opened to mixed reviews and was a box office failure. He then directed the action drama Kaiva with Dhanveerah and Megha Shetty in the lead roles and released in 2023, which also opened to mixed reviews and ended as box office disappointment.

In January 2021, Bell Bottom 2, the sequel to the blockbuster Bell Bottom was announced to be directed by Jayathirtha. However the shooting of the film was paused as of 2022 owing to Rishab Shetty's other commitments.

== Theatre activities ==
Jayathirtha has conducted more than 150 theatre training programs, focusing on issues including life skills. He penned and directed 65 street plays and ten stage plays from 1996 to 2007. He organized those plays to spread social awareness among illiterates and the backward classes. Jayathirtha directed Hathim Thi, an experiment with 500 actors, at the Al-Ameen school building.

Jayathirtha has used street plays as an effective medium to convey philosophical messages, concerning social issues, imbued with the entertaining flow. His approach is to involve the audience in the flow of the plays. He scripted six stage plays and 69 street plays/shows.

== Radio ==
Jayathirtha directed a 450-episode of educational radio drama for children, Chukki Chinna – Chinnara Chukki, for an NGO Education Development Center under Sarva Shikshana Abhiyana program of Government of India. This interactive syllabus-based radio program was recorded between 2005 and 2007, but it continues to play on the radio for first-standard to sixth-standard students in Karnataka government schools.

== Recognition ==
- Best Back Stage designer 1994 (Abhinaya Tharanga)
- Best script writer 1996 (Abhinaya Tharanga)
- Best stage reviewer 1997 (B.V.Karanth Award)
- Second Best Small Story Award – from Gulbarga University (2002)
- First place in small story award – from Belagali Sahithya Pratistana. (2002)
- First place in small story award – from Kannada Sahithya Parishath. (2002)
- First place in script writing – Street play – Pravardhini from Sahithya Sankramana (2003)
- Best Indian short film Hasivu from Cinerail film festival in Paris

== Filmography ==
Year	Title	Notes
2007	Hasivu	Short film
2011	Olave Mandara	
2013	Tony	Also lyricist
2015	Bullet Basya	
2017	Beautiful Manasugalu	
2018	Vanilla	
2019	Bell Bottom	
2022	Banaras	
2023	Kaiva	
TBA	Bell Bottom 2	Announced

=== As screenwriter ===
Year	Title	Notes
2015	Endendigu	

== Awards ==
Movie	Award	Category	Result	Ref.
Hasivu	Cinerail Film Festival, Paris	Best short film (Indian)	Won	
Olave Mandara	59th Filmfare Awards South	Best Director – Kannada	Won	
Olave Mandara	Raghavendra Chitravaani Award	Best Director	Won	
Olave Mandara	'Big FM – ETV' award	Best Director	Won	
Olave Mandara	Santosham Award	Best Director - Kannada	Won	
Olave Mandara	1st SIIMA Awards	Best Director	Nominated	
Tony	2013 Karnataka State Film Awards	Best Screenplay	Won	
Tony	Lalitha Kala Academy Award	Best Director	Won	
Beautiful Manasugalu	65th Filmfare Awards South	Best Director	Nominated	
Beautiful Manasugalu	KAFTA Times of India 2017	Best Dialogues	Won	
Bell Bottom	Zee Comedy Awards 2020	Best Director	Won	
Bell Bottom	Chandanavana Critics' Academy Award	Best Screenplay	Won	
Bell Bottom	Critics’ Choice Film Awards 2020	Best Director	Won	
Bell Bottom	9th SIIMA Awards	Best Director	Nominated	
