= Banaras (2022 film) =

Indian film

- Theatrical release poster
- Directed by: Jayatheertha
- Written by: Jayatheertha
- Produced by: Tilakraj Ballal; Muzammil Ahmed Khan
- Starring: Zaid Khan; Sonal Monteiro; Sujay Shastry; Devaraj; Achyuth Kumar
- Cinematography: Advaitha Gurumurthy
- Edited by: K. M. Prakash
- Music by: B. Ajaneesh Loknath
- Production company: NK Productions
- Distributed by: Sakthi Film Factory (Tamil Nadu); Panorama Studios (North India); KVN Productions (Karnataka)
- Release date: 4 November 2022
- Running time: 160 minutes
- Country: India
- Language: Kannada

Banaras is a 2022 Indian Kannada-language romance film written and directed by Jayatheertha and produced by Tilakraj Ballal. It stars Zaid Khan and Sonal Monteiro in the lead roles. The film's music composer is B. Ajaneesh Loknath and cinematographer is Advaitha Gurumurthy. The film was set to be released early 2021 but was postponed due to COVID-19 pandemic, It was released on November 4, 2022.

== Plot ==
Banaras is a poignant love story set in the backdrop of Kashi (Varanasi/Banaras). The film saw the debut of Zaid Khan. Most of the film's scenes were shot in Banaras except a few portions filmed in Bengaluru.

== Cast ==
- Zaid Khan as Sidharth Simha
- Sonal Monteiro as Dhani
- Sujay Shastry as Shambu
- Devaraj as Ajay Simha
- Achyuth Kumar as Narayan Shastry
- Barkath Ali as Peter Jakson
- Sapna Raj as Shiva
- Debobrato Mukherjee as Ravi

== Release ==
Banaras was released in cinemas on 4 November 2022 in Kannada along with a Hindi dubbed version.

== Music ==
Banaras

Soundtrack album by B. Ajaneesh Loknath
- Released: 2022
- Genre: Feature film soundtrack
- Language: Kannada
- Labels: Lahari Music; T-Series
- Producer: B. Ajaneesh Loknath

The film's music was composed by B. Ajaneesh Loknath. The music rights are owned by Lahari Music and T-Series for Hindi and South languages.

Kannada
| No. | Title | Lyrics | Singer(s) | Length |
|---|---|---|---|---|
| 1. | "Maaya Gange" | V. Nagendra Prasad | Armaan Malik | 4:37 |
| 2. | "Hennu Hadeyalu Beda" | Janapada | Harshika Devanath | 4:09 |
| 3. | "Troll Song" | V. Nagendra Prasad | B. Ajaneesh Lokanth | 3:20 |
| 4. | "Belakina Kavithe" | V. Nagendra Prasad | Sanjith Hegde, Sangeetha Ravindranath | 3:39 |

Malayalam
| No. | Title | Lyrics | Singer(s) | Length |
|---|---|---|---|---|
| 1. | "Maaya Gange" | Arafat Mohammed | Hesham Abdul Wahab | 4:37 |
| 2. | "Penny Piravi" | Akhil M. Bose | Badra Rejin | 4:09 |
| 3. | "Troll Song" | Aadi, Akhil M Bose | Jassie Gift | 3:20 |
| 4. | "Hrudayamithaake" | Aadi | Karthik, K. S. Chithra | 3:39 |

Tamil
| No. | Title | Lyrics | Singer(s) | Length |
|---|---|---|---|---|
| 1. | "Maaya Ganga" | Palani Bharathi | Armaan Malik | 4:37 |
| 2. | "Pennin Nilaildhudhaana" | Palani Bharathi | Harshika Devanath | 4:09 |
| 3. | "Troll Song" | Palani Bharathi | Tippu | 3:20 |
| 4. | "Ilakana Kavithai" | Palani Bharathi | Pradeep Kumar, K. S. Chithra | 3:39 |

Telugu
| No. | Title | Lyrics | Singer(s) | Length |
|---|---|---|---|---|
| 1. | "Maaya Gange" | Krishna Kanth | Armaan Malik | 4:37 |
| 2. | "Kannu Terchina Paata" | Kasarala Syam | Indravathi Chauhan | 4:09 |
| 3. | "Troll Song" | Bhaskarabhatla | Tippu | 3:20 |
| 4. | "Tholi Tholi Valape" | Krishna Kanth, Bhaskarabhatla | Karthik, K. S. Chithra | 3:39 |

Hindi
| No. | Title | Lyrics | Singer(s) | Length |
|---|---|---|---|---|
| 1. | "Maaya Gange" | Arafat Mohammed | Armaan Malik | 4:37 |
| 2. | "Maiya Meri" | Shekhar Astitwa | Rashmeet Kaur | 4:09 |
| 3. | "Troll Song" | Arafat Mehamood | Nakash Aziz | 3:20 |
| 4. | "Ghazalon Ki Tarah" | Arafat Mehmood | Javed Ali, Bela Shende | 3:39 |

== See also ==
- List of films impacted by the COVID-19 pandemic
