= Hariprriya =

Indian actress

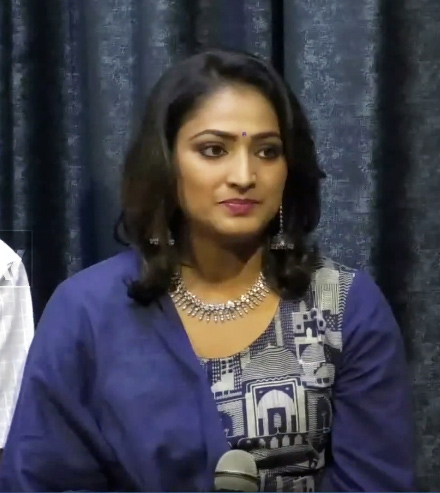
- Hariprriya in 2021
- Born: Shruthi Chandrasena; 29 October 1991 (age 34); Chikkaballapur, India
- Other names: Kannada Beauty, Sandalwood Beauty Queen
- Occupations: Actress; model
- Years active: 2007–present
- Works: Full list
- Spouse: Vasishta N. Simha (m. 2023)
- Children: 1

Shruthi Chandrasena (born 29 October 1991), known professionally as Hariprriya, is an Indian actress and model who predominantly works in Kannada films and has also appeared in Telugu, Tamil, and Malayalam films. Hariprriya gained wide acclaim for her role in Ugramm and is also known for her work in Ranna, Ricky, Neerdose, Bharjari, Samhaara, Jai Simha, Bell Bottom, Soojidara and D/O Parvathamma.

== Early life ==
Hariprriya was born on 29 October 1991 in Chikkaballapur, India. After completing her schooling, she received training in the dance form of Bharatanatyam. Later, her family moved to Bangalore, where she completed pre-university courses. In 2013, her mother urged Shruthi to alter spelling from Hariprriya to Harriprriya for numerological reasons, however, she declined the reports, citing "My mother insisted that I change my spelling."

== Career ==
=== Early work (2007–2014) ===
Hariprriya used to participate in a number of cultural programmes. When she was studying in 12th class, director Richard Castelino saw stills of her from the programmes and offered her the female lead role in the Tulu film Badi. She then made her Kannada film debut in Manasugula Mathu Madhura (2008), following which she was part of Vasanthakala. Her performance in the political satire Kallara Santhe (2009) opposite Yash earned her a Filmfare nomination for Best Kannada actress, while her next film Cheluveye Ninne Nodalu which starred Shiva Rajkukar received a number of positive reviews, making Hariprriya popular in Karnataka. In 2010, she also forayed into the Tamil and Telugu film industries with Kanagavel Kaaka, and Bhumika Chawla's maiden production, Thakita Thakita, opposite Harshvardhan Rane respectively, with the latter emerging a moderate success. After that, Hariprriya shifted her focus to Tamil and Telugu projects, working on Cheran's Muran in Tamil and Pilla Zamindar in Telugu which had Nani in a male lead role, was a big superhit movie. She was also part of the political drama Mukhyamantri I Love You, produced in 2008, which has not been released. She debuted in Malayalam with Thiruvambadi Thamban." In her third Telugu film Abbayi Class Ammayi Mass, she played a call girl, which required a two-week long immersion workshop to get into character.

=== Ugramm success and breakthrough (2014–2016) ===
In 2014, she returned to Kannada cinema with the gangster film Ugramm. Shraddhaa of The New Indian Express wrote that it was "a strong performance by Hariprriya, who is natural in her act". The film went on to become a major commercial success and she was said to have made a "sensational comeback to Kannada films". Sify wrote that Ugramm "did wonders to Hariprriya" as she subsequently offered more Kannada projects. After the success of Ugram, she gained popularity in the Kannada film industry and she became one of the most wanted heroines in the industry. She became part of the big banner films, Ranna and Ricky as well as the comedy film Bullet Basya. She started 2015 with Ranna where she was paired with Indian actor Sudeep for the first time. The movie went on to become hit at the box office.

Her second release in the year is Bullet Basya where she was paired opposite Sharan and received a positive response for her role as Kaveri in the film. In 2016, her first release was Ricky opposite Rakshit Shetty where she played as Radha a Naxalite, for which she had reduced her weight by half. The critics wrote that "The performance of Hariprriya in the film was appreciated." Her next release in the year was Ranatantra where she was paired opposite Vijay Raghavendra. She was also seen in a special appearance in a song in Bhale Jodi. Her next release in the year was in hit movie, Neer Dose where she played the character Kumudha a bar dancer. The critics wrote that "Hariprriya has essayed a powerful role in her career. Her performance in the movie is phenomenal". The movie turned out to be a turning point in her film career.

=== Established actress (2017–present) ===
After the success of Neer Dose movie, she became one of the prominent actresses of the Kannada film industry. In 2017, she played Haasini's role, a North Karnataka girl in Bharjari, film. After Ranna, she and Rachita Ram were seen together onscreen for the second time. The New Indian Express described "Hariprriya has a good role in the movie. Her character is the main turning point for the story." She also appeared in a cameo appearance in Anjaniputra film.

In 2018, she returned to Telugu cinema with Jai Simha film playing a mechanic's role. The movie became a blockbuster hit. Her next release was a Kannada film Kanaka. Her next release along with Chiranjeevi Sarja was Samhara, in which she essayed a negative character. The New Indian Express wrote that "Hariprriya's performance as a negative character is phenomenal. She got a chance to prove her versatility of acting in the movie." Her next release for the year was Life Jothe Ondh Selfie. The Times of India wrote "Hariprriya has played the modern girl Rashmi who has lots of pains from her past. She has essayed the character very well."

Her first release of 2019 was Bell Bottom that became the biggest blockbuster film of 2019. The writers of The New Indian Express wrote "Hariprriya's character as the innocent but intelligent love interest is well placed". Publication writers of described "Hariprriya delivers yet another solid act, showing why she is considered as one of the most versatile actresses around right now". The Deccan Chronicle wrote "It is Hariprriya, who yet again finds a perfect character and is at her charming best playing Kusuma." Her next release of 2019 was Soojidara directed by Mounish Badiger. Her next film was D/O Parvathamma. Her 25th Kannada film was Naganna's Kurukshetra, starring Sumalatha Ambareesh, Suraj Gowda and Prabhu Mundukar as the lead roles.

Her next in 2019 is film with Tejaswi's movie Ellide Illi Tanaka. The Chitraloka described "it is Hariprriya who steals the show with yet another sensible character. It makes the audience fall in love with her portrayal of Nandini's character on screen." Her next release of 2019 was Mayura Raghavendra's film Kannad Gothilla, starring Sudharani and other actors. During the same year, she acted in Katha Sangama directed by Rishab Shetty.

Hariprriya's first and only release of 2020 is Hari Santosh's historical novel-based movie Bicchugatti: Chapter 1 − Dalvayi Dange.

After a gap of a year her first release in 2022 was Vijay Prasad's comedy drama film Petromax where she was paired opposite Satish Ninasam. The film met with negative reviews upon release from both audience and critics and was a commercial failure at the box office. Her next release was her Tamil comeback film Naan Mirugamai Maara where she was paired opposite Sasikumar where she played the role of a housewife named Anandi. The film met with negative reviews from both audience and critics and it was a box-office bomb

In 2023 her first release of year was Yadha Yadha Hi, Kannada remake of the Telugu film Evaru where she was paired opposite Diganth and Vasishta for the first time. The critics praised her performance in the film stating "Hariprriya's acting, which sees a blend of determination, vulnerability, and cunning, command attention. As a heroine, she has a substantial full-length role that showcases her talent after a considerable time. Her chemistry with Vasishta is palpable, and their on-screen dynamic works seamlessly." "Full marks to Hariprriya for pulling off Priyanka's character which has negative shades." The film was a commercial failure at the box office.

In 2025 her two films Thaayi Kasthur Gandhi and Amruthamathi were released digitally directly by skipping the theatrical release on Amazon Prime Video.

=== Upcoming projects ===
As of May 2025, Hariprriya has four releases: Vijay Kiran's Happy Ending that features Gurunandhan, K.Madesh's Lagaam that features Upendra, Jayathertha's Bell Bottom 2 with Rishab Shetty, Shashank's untitled film with Upendra.

== Controversies ==
In 2019, Mounesh Badiger, the director of the Kannada film Soojidara, accused Hariprriya of defaming his film. He later filed a complaint with the Karnataka Film Chamber of Commerce, claiming that she had portrayed the film negatively.

== Personal life ==
Hariprriya married Kannada actor Vasishta N. Simha on 26 January 2023 in Mysuru.

== Awards and nominations ==
Hariprriya awards and nominations
Awards and nominations
Award	Wins	Nominations

Totals (Note: Certain award groups do not simply award one winner. They acknowledge several different recipients, have runners-up, and have third place. Since this is a specific recognition and is different from losing an award, runner-up mentions are considered wins in this award tally. For simplification and to avoid errors, each award in this list has been presumed to have had a prior nomination.)
- Wins: 2
- Nominations: 17

Year	Award(s)	Category	Film	Result	Ref
2010	57th Filmfare Awards South	Best Actress	Kallara Santhe	Nominated	
2010	Suvarna Film Awards	Best Actress	Kallara Santhe	Nominated	
2010	Udaya Film Awards	Best Actress	Kallara Santhe	Nominated	
2011	Suvarna Film Awards	Best Supporting-Actress	Cheluveye Ninne Nodalu	Nominated	
2011	Udaya Film Awards	Best Supporting Actress	Cheluveye Ninne Nodalu	Nominated	
2015	62nd Filmfare Awards South	Best Actress	Ugramm	Nominated	
2017	64th Filmfare Awards South	Best Actress	Neer Dose	Nominated	
2017	6th South Indian International Movie Awards	Best Actress	Neer Dose	Nominated	
2017	City Cine Awards	Best Actress	Neer Dose	Nominated	
2020	Chandanavana Film Critics Awards	Best Actress	Bell Bottom	Nominated	
2020	Critics Choice Film Awards	Best Actress	Bell Bottom	Nominated	
2021	Chandanavana Film Critics Awards	Best Actress	Bicchugatti- Chapter 1 Dalavayi Dange	Nominated	
2020	Noida International Film Festival	Best Actress	Amruthamathi	Won	
2020	Austria International Film Festival	Best Actress	Amruthamathi	Nominated	
2021	Atlanta Film Festival	Best Actress	Amruthamathi	Nominated	
2021	Los Angeles Film Festival	Best Actress	Amruthamathi	Nominated	
2021	Hollywood International Golden Age Film Festival	Best Actress	Amruthamathi	Won	
2021	Sundance Film Festival	Best Actress	Amruthamathi	Nominated	
