= Soojidaara =

2019 Kannada drama film

- Theatrical release poster
- Directed by: Mounish Badiger
- Written by: Mounish Badiger
- Produced by: Sachindran Athnayak; Abhijith Kotegar
- Starring: Hariprriya; Yashwanth Shetty
- Cinematography: Asok V. Raman
- Edited by: Mohan L. Rangakhale
- Music by: Bhinna Shadja
- Production company: Cine Sneha Talkies
- Release date: 10 May 2019
- Country: India
- Language: Kannada

Soojidaara is a 2019 Indian Kannada language drama film written and directed by Mounish Badiger, making his debut into Sandalwood. It is produced by Sachidran Aathnayak and Abijith Kotegar under the Cine Sneha Talkies banner. It features Haripriya and Yashwanth Shetty in the lead roles; Yashwanth is making his debut as a lead actor with the film. The supporting cast includes Achyuth Kumar, Suchendra Prasad, and Chaitra Kootoor. The films background score was composed by S. Pradeep Varman, the soundtrack by Bhinna Shadja; cinematography was handled by Ashok V. Raman and editing by Mohan L. Rangakhale.

== Cast ==
- Hariprriya as Padmashree
- Yashwanth Shetty
- Achyuth Kumar
- Suchendra Prasad
- Chaitra Kootoor
- Shreya Anchan

== Soundtrack ==
Soojidara

Soundtrack album by Bhinna Shadja
- Genre: Feature film soundtrack
- Language: Kannada
- Label: Anand Audio
- Producer: Sachindranath Aathnayak, Aabhijith Kotegar

The film's background score was composed by S. Pradeep Varman and the soundtrack was composed by Bhinna Sadja. The music rights were acquired by Ananda Audio.

Tracklist
No.	Title	Lyrics	Singer(s)	Length
1.	"Jaaruthiruve"	Vikram Hatwar	Mithun Eshwar	4:24
2.	"Hunnime Raathriyali"	Chaitra Kotoor	Sparsha R K	4:08
3.	"Soojiye"	Santha Sishunala Sharif	Tejaswi Haridas	4:20
4.	"Ee Sparsha Ekaantha"	Mounish Badiger	Nagendranath Nayak	3:30
5.	"Jaaruthiruve-Female"	Mounish Badiger, Vikram Hatwar	Sandhya Pathki	4:40
Total length:				20:28

== Release ==
The film is scheduled to be released on 10 May 2019 all over Karnataka in around 180 theatres.
