= Ellidde Illi Tanaka =

2019 film by Tejaswi

- Theatrical Poster
- Directed by: Tejaswi
- Written by: Arun Ramadas
- Produced by: Srujan Lokesh
- Starring: Hariprriya; Srujan Lokesh
- Cinematography: H. C. Venu
- Edited by: Ganesh Mallaiah
- Music by: Arjun Janya
- Production company: Lokesh Productions
- Release date: October 11, 2019
- Running time: 138 minutes
- Country: India
- Language: Kannada

Ellidde Illi Tanaka is a 2019 Indian Kannada language action romance film, written by Arun Ramadass and directed by Tejaswi making his debut. It is produced by Srujan Lokesh under his banner Lokesh Productions. The film is starring Hariprriya and Srujan Lokesh in the lead role while Tara, Sadhu Kokila and Girija Lokesh in the other supporting roles. The music for the film is scored by Arjun Janya. The cinematography and editing is done by H.C.Venu

== Plot ==
Surya (Srujan Lokesh) is bundled off to London by his parents (Tara and Avinash) in his childhood, just to make sure he doesn't become one of those unworthy street Romeos due to inappropriate company – his friends. However, his upbringing in London for more than 15 years doesn't change him much.

An opportunity coupled with his love for India and affection towards his friends brings him back home. Casually taking up a challenge thrown by a friend to attend an interview leads Surya to visit a company where he meets his dream girl Nandini (Hariprriya). Surya puts his best foot forward and secures a job just to pursue his lady love, in the process fabricating a web of lies.

Nandini, who is shown to be a hard taskmaster and a stickler for honesty, is unaware of Surya's fabrications and is all set to marry him. She is confronted with reality on the day of their wedding. Whether Nandini ditches Surya or goes against her principles and marries the man who has told her everything, but the truth forms the rest of the plot.

== Cast ==
- Haripriya as Nandhini
- Srujan Lokesh as Surya
- Tara as Lakshmi
- Sadhu Kokila as KK
- Girija Lokesh as Meenakshi
- Avinash as Harsh Vardhan
- Radhika Rao as Spoorthi
- Yashas Surya as Suresh
- Giri Shivanna as Mani
- Mandya Ramesh as Brokar
- Sihi Kahi Chandru
- Taranga Vishwa as Bhaskar
- Tabla Nani as Daya

== Production ==
The film has been produced by Srujan Lokesh. The film was announced on 9 December 2018 with its principal photography. The film started to roll on the next day of the muhurtha. The film was officially announced in Srujan's famous talk show Majaa Talkies. The film was announced by stating Srujan Lokesh will be turning producer for a film of his own. Later, Hariprriya was on board as the lead actress to be paired opposite Srujan Lokesh in the film. Then Arjun Janya was approached to score music for the film. and H.C.Venu was on board as the cinematographer.

== Sound track ==
The sound track for the film is done by Arjun Janya.

Ellidde Illi Tanaka

Soundtrack album by Arjun Janya
- Released: 2019
- Genre: Feature film soundtrack
- Language: Kannada
- Label: Anand Audio
- Producer: Srujan Lokesh

Arjun Janya chronology
Pailwaan (2019)	Ellidde Illi Tanaka (2019)	Bharaate (2019)

All lyrics are written by Kaviraj.

No.	Title	Lyrics	Singer(s)	Length
1.	"Ellidde Illi Tanaka"	Kaviraj	Sonu Nigam	4:03
2.	"Heightu Aaradi"	Kaviraj	Vijay Prakash	4:19
3.	"Talking Star"	Chethan Kumar (director)	Santhosh Venky	4:28
4.	"Le Suresa"	Kaviraj	Anirudh Sastry	4:21
Total length:				17:11

== Release ==
The soundtrack was released on 25 August 2019. The film was released on 11 October 2019. The film is released in around 150 theaters.

== Critical reception ==
The Times Of India paper gave 3.5/5 stating "Debutant director Thejasvi set out to make an entertainer and give Srujan an image makeover, which he does. The film has laughs aplenty, which almost made the first half feel like an extension of their hit TV show, Maja Talkies, but the second half makes up for that with romance, drama and action galore. Srujan Lokesh, Giri Shivanna and Hariprriya, along with the rest of the extended cast, make this a worthwhile movie outing."

The New Indian Express paper gave 3/5 stating "A humorous tale peppered with action elements, and strong family bondings, Ellide Elli Tanaka reminds you of familiar stories we’ve seen in the past. Thejasvi, in his first directorial, presents a mix of comedy, emotions, love, action and family sentiments - everything required for a commercial entertainer, and also tucks in a message. Hariprriya not only adds the glamour quotient, but also plays an integral part in the proceedings. A couple of good melodies composed by Arjun Janya, and a few picturesque locations captured by HC Venu, are the highlights of the film, which will surely satisfy the die-hard fans of Talking Star Srujan Lokesh."

The Deccan Chronicle paper gave 3/5 stating "An age-old saying that it is perfectly fine to lie a thousand times to get a marriage done is the key ingredient here, stirred well with entertaining lies. If Srujan shines with comedy, it is Hariprriya who steals the show with yet another impressive act. Her beautiful presence gives another good reason not to miss Ellidde Illi Tanaka. Overall, it's a feel-good movie worth watching it once for some light entertainment."
