= Bullet Basya =

2015 Indian film directed by Jayatheertha

- Film poster
- Directed by: Jayatheertha
- Screenplay by: Jayatheertha
- Story by: Sharan; Jayatheertha
- Produced by: Jayanna; Bhogendra
- Starring: Sharan; Haripriya; Yathiraj Jaggesh
- Cinematography: Sugnaan
- Edited by: K. M. Prakash
- Music by: Arjun Janya
- Production company: Jayanna Combines
- Distributed by: Jayanna Films
- Release date: 24 July 2015
- Running time: 139 minutes
- Country: India
- Language: Kannada

Bullet Basya is a 2015 Indian Kannada comedy film directed by Jayatheertha, and stars Sharan and Haripriya. The supporting cast features Rangayana Raghu, Sadhu Kokila and Yathiraj Jaggesh. The title of the film was taken from Sudheer's character in the 1989 Kannada film C.B.I. Shankar. The creators however confirmed that there was no connection between the two.

== Cast ==
- Sharan as "dual role" Basavaraj alias Bullet Basya / Muthu
- Haripriya as Kaveri
- Rangayana Raghu
- Sadhu Kokila as Basya's father
- Prashanth Siddi aide of Basya
- Yathiraj Jaggesh aide of Basya
- Giri Godhulli
- Girish Shivanna
- Ramesh Bhat
- Girija Lokesh as Muthu's mother
- Neenasam Ashwath
- Muni
- Thanveer
- Tabla Nani as Minister
- Master Anand as Painter

== Soundtrack ==
Bullet Basya

Soundtrack album by Arjun Janya
- Released: 26 May 2015
- Recorded: 2014–2015
- Genre: Feature film soundtrack
- Length: 21:04
- Label: D Beats
- Producer: Arjun Janya

Arjun Janya scored the film's background music and composed for its soundtrack, with lyrics for the tracks penned by V. Nagendra Prasad, Raghu Niduvalli, Yogaraj Bhat and Kaviraj. This was the third venture of Sharan with Janya after the successful Rambo (2012) and Victory (2012). The soundtrack album was launched on 26 May 2015 in Bangalore by the D-Beats company. The album consists of five tracks.

=== Track listing ===
| No. | Title | Lyrics | Singer(s) | Length |
|---|---|---|---|---|
| 1. | "Bullet Basya" | Raghu Niduvalli | Tippu | 4:04 |
| 2. | "Thutthoori Talavarayya" | V. Nagendra Prasad | Vijay Prakash | 4:13 |
| 3. | "Kaal Kg Kallekaai" | Yogaraj Bhat | Sharan, Indu Nagaraj | 4:22 |
| 4. | "Baare Kunthkolae" | Kaviraj | Nakash Aziz, Anuradha Bhat | 3:55 |
| 5. | "Common Common" | V. Nagendra Prasad | Malathi, Chintan Vikas | 4:30 |
| Total length: | | | | 21:04 |

== Release and reception ==
The film was given the "U/A" (Parental Guidance) certificate by the Regional Censor Board and without any cuts. The makers looked at a June 2015 release. However, with over 300 theatres screening Ranna and Vajrakaya, its release was delayed. Anticipating "stiff competition" from the Telugu film Baahubali: The Beginning which saw a 10 July release, Bullet Basya was released on 24 July. Upon theatrical release, the film received generally mixed to negative reviews from critics and audiences alike. The audiences felt the film had a "story with no freshness in the presentation." Critics, calling the film a "sex comedy", echoed the same views and felt that "it had nothing new to offer" and added that it was filled with dialogues and songs with double entendre.

A. Sharadhaa of The New Indian Express called the film "a thorough entertainer (laced with innuendo)." She paid credit to the performances of all the actors, and the cinematography and music. Archana Nathan of The Hindu called the film "An overdose of masculinity" and wrote, "The film is guilty of not just weak writing but also a poor cinematic imagination." Reviewing the film for Deccan Herald, S. Viswanath wrote, "[The film] is a stereotypical, stock-in-trade Sharan comedy" and added that "it would be futile to look for logic." Writing for Bangalore Mirror, Shyam Prasad S. called the a "Timepass nonsense" and wrote, "Though they are well-shot and visually good, they fail to add any weight to the film. The cinematography and editing are neat and there is no baggage or drag. The film is silly and is gracious enough not to take itself seriously." Sunayana Suresh of The Times of India rated the film 2.5/5 and called it a "senseless and sexist comedy" and wrote that "there is nothing new in the script." She further wrote, "The comic ensemble including Yathiraj, Anand, Rangayana Raghu and Sadhu Kokila, do their bit. The cinematography and art direction is commendable, while the music, unlike other Sharan films, doesn't have the zing". Shashiprasad S. M. of Deccan Chronicle too rated the film 2.5/5 and wrote, "With no soul in the subject, the director has decorated the body (script) with lots of jewellery which pretends to shine, but has no real spark in it!" On Haripriya's performance, he wrote, "[She] grabs and hold attention of audience from her entry until climax." He concluded writing, "[The film] is more noisy and less fun."
