= Kannad Gothilla =

Film by Mayuraa Raghavendra

- Theatrical Poster
- Directed by: Mayuraa Raghavendra
- Written by: Mayuraa Raghavendra
- Screenplay by: Mayuraa Raghavendra
- Story by: Mayuraa Raghavendra
- Produced by: Kumara Kanteerava
- Starring: Hariprriya; Sudharani
- Cinematography: Giridhar Divan
- Edited by: Giridhar Divan
- Music by: Nakul Abhyankar
- Production company: Shri Ramaratna Productions
- Distributed by: Jayanna Films
- Release date: 22 November 2019
- Running time: 120 mins
- Country: India
- Language: Kannada

Kannad Gothilla (transl. Don't know Kannada) (Note: Kannad is a common mispronunciation of "Kannada" in Hindi due to schwa deletion) is a 2019 Indian Kannada-language thriller film written and directed by Mayuraa Raghavendra making his debut. It is produced by Kumar Kanteerva under his banner Shri Ramarathna Productions. The film stars Hariprriya and Sudharani. The music for the film is scored by Nakul Abhyankar. The cinematography and editing is done by Giridhar Divan.

== Cast ==
- Hariprriya as Shruthi Chakravarthy
- Sudha Rani
- Pavan as Soma
- Dharmanna as Manjunath
- Mayur Raghavendra as Harshavardhan
- Sihi Kahi Chandru
- Sudha Belawadi
- Santhosh Karki
- Rohith Bhanuprakash
- Jayashree Ramaiah
- Remo
- Gopalkrishna Deshpande
- Tommy

== Production ==
The film was produced by Kumar Kanteerava. The film was announced on 6 September 2018. The film started to roll on the same day . The film wrapped up on 19 December 2018. The film recently announced that they are hunting for new singers to sing the title track of the film. The team left the track of the title track on PRK Audio Channel .

== Soundtrack ==
The soundtrack for the film is done by Nakul Abhyankar. The Audio Rights of the film has been sold to PRK Audio.

Kannad Gothilla

Soundtrack album by Nakul Abhyankar
- Genre: Feature film soundtrack
- Language: Kannada
- Label: PRK Audio
- Producer: Kumara Kanteerava

No.	Title	Lyrics	Singers	Length
1.	"Kaliyo Nee Kannada"	Hari Paarak	Raghu Dixit	4:26
2.	"Kannad Gothilla"	Vasuki Vaibhav	Nakul Abhyankar, Aishwarya Rangarajan, Aneesh Keshava Rao, Kalyan M, Yugadarshini	5:00
3.	"Jaya Bharatha Jananiya"	Kuvempu	Nakul Abhyankar, Ramya Bhat Abhyankar	3:11

== Release ==
The film was first schedule to release on 15 November 2019, but it was postponed to 22 November 2019. Upon release it received mixed reviews.
