= D/O Parvathamma =

- Directed by: Shankar.J
- Written by: Shankar J
- Story by: Shankar J
- Produced by: Shashidhar KM; Vijaylakshmi Krishnegowda; Sandeep Hedge; Shewtha Madhusudhan
- Starring: Hariprriya; Sumalatha; Suraj Gowda; Prabhu Mundkur
- Cinematography: Arul K Somasundaram
- Edited by: Suresh Armugam
- Music by: Midhun Mukundan
- Production company: Disha Entertainments
- Release date: 24 May 2019
- Running time: 110 minutes
- Country: India
- Language: Kannada

D/O Parvathamma is a 2019 Indian Kannada action drama film written and directed Shankar J and starring Hariprriya and Sumalatha along with Suraj Gowda and Prabhu Mundkur. The film is Hariprriya's 25th Kannada Movie. The project was announced on 25 May 2018.

== Cast ==
- Haripriya as Investigating Officer Vaidhei
- Sumalatha Ambareesh as Parvathamma
- Suraj Gowda as Shastri alias Anantu
- Prabhu Mundkur as Rajesh

== Soundtrack ==
D/O Parvathamma

Soundtrack album by Midhun Mukundan
- Recorded: Hriday Goswami and Jim John
- Venue: Bengaluru and Guwahati
- Studio: Pranava Studios and X-Noise Studios
- Genre: Feature film soundtrack
- Language: Kannada
- Label: PRK Audio
- Producer: Midhun Mukundan

The film's background score and the soundtracks are composed and sung by Midhun Mukundhan. The music rights were acquired by PRK Audio.

Tracklist
No.	Title	Lyrics	Singer(s)	Length
1.	"Jeevakilli Jeevabete"	Dhananjay (actor)	Karthik Chennoji Rao, Narayan Sharma, Midhun Mukundan	5:45
2.	"Neeli Baaninalli"	Kiran Kaverappa	Eesha Suchi, Mridula Mukundan, Midhun Mukundan	3:48
Total length:				9:33

== Release ==
The movie was scheduled to release in April. But later, when lead actress Sumalatha Aambareesh contested in the Lok Sabha Election 2019 from Mandya, then the movie was scheduled to release on 24 May. First, the makers had planned to release the film in around 80 theatres across Karnataka, but after seeing the response for the trailer and songs, they released the movie in approximately 200 theatres across Karnataka. The trailer of the film was released on 14 May 2019, and the songs were released in the same month. After release, the movie got a good opening in all the theatres by having Housefull shows in almost all theatres on Friday, Saturday and Sunday

== Critical reception ==
The film received positive reviews from critics. The Times Of India writer Sunayna Suresh wrote,"D/O Parvathamma is entertaining in parts and a one-time watch in all. There is scope for improvement, but the director's atypical characterisation of his leading lady is commendable. Hariprriya puts in her best for this film, and it shows. Suraj Gowda and Prabhu Mundkur play their respective small parts well. Hariprriya and Sumalatha Ambareesh's scenes are also a highlight. Go ahead and try this film if you want to watch something different, yet not too far from the regular commercial fare."
