= Olave Mandara =

2011 Indian Kannada road movie by Jayatheertha

- Film poster
- Directed by: Jayatheertha
- Written by: Jayatheertha
- Produced by: B. Govinda Raju
- Starring: Srikanth; Aakanksha Mansukhani
- Cinematography: Ravi Kumar Sana
- Edited by: K. M. Prakash
- Music by: Deva
- Production company: Alliance Pictures
- Release date: 21 January 2011
- Running time: 147 minutes
- Country: India
- Language: Kannada

Olave Mandara (transl. Oh love, hibiscus) is a 2011 Indian Kannada road movie written and directed by Jayatheertha, and starring debutantes Srikanth and Aakanksha Mansukhani in the lead roles. The supporting cast features Rangayana Raghu, Veena Sundar, Nassar and Sadhu Kokila.

The sub-plot of the film is inspired by real-life events of Dashrath Manjhi, who cut a rocky hill for 22 years to build a road in memory of his wife.

Srikant was adjudged as the 'Promising Newcomer (Male)' for his performance in the film, based on an online poll conducted by The Times of India.

== Plot ==
Srikanth (Srikanth), a son of a rich industrialist (Nassar), meets Preeti (Aakanksha Mansukhani), an Assamese girl, in a dance competition in Coimbatore, and falls in love with her. His initial intentions were to only steal a few kisses from her. Bound by guilt, he sets off on foot to Assam to meet her as promised. On his journey, he faces the realities of life as he meets various characters and witnessing incidents such as a farmer couple sharing their lunch with a 'kind' thief (Sadhu Kokila), and a cobbler (Rangayana Raghu), taking his disabled wife (Veena Sundar) on a pilgrimage to Kashi on a bullock-cart. Srikanth is moved on witnessing these. The film ends with Srikanth and Preeti reuniting.

== Cast ==
- Srikanth as Srikanth
- Aakanksha Mansukhani as Preeti
- Sharan as Sandeep "Sandy"
- Rangayana Raghu as Ratna
- Veena Sundar as Nanji
- Sadhu Kokila as Kannadiga in Gaya
- Nassar as Srikanth's father
- Surya as Professor
- Honnavalli Krishna as Mani
- Ashok Jambe
- Ramachandra Prathihari
- Pranayamurthy
- Pradeep Varma
- Shailaja
- Prof. Ramdas
- Amrutha Gowda
- Archana
- Dr. Chikkahejjaji Mahadev
- Jayalakshmi
- Kumarimuthu as a Tamilian

== Soundtrack ==
Olave Mandara

Soundtrack album by Deva
- Released: December 2010
- Recorded: 2010
- Genre: Feature film soundtrack
- Label: Lahari Music

Deva scored the film's background music and composed for its soundtrack, with its lyrics written by Kaviraj, K. Kalyan, K. V. Raju, Hamsalekha and Jayatheertha. The lyrics of the track "Onde Kerili" was taken from a poem of G. P. Rajarathnam. The soundtrack album consists of nine tracks. It was released in December 2010.

Track list
No.	Title	Lyrics	Singer(s)	Length
1.	"Shreaky Shreaky"	Kaviraj	Karthik
2.	"Janapadada Kanmarave"	K. V. Raju	Shankar Mahadevan
3.	"Yaaritta Preethiyo"	K. Kalyan	Harsha
4.	"Olave Olave Mannisu"	K. Kalyan	Harsha
5.	"Nadi Nadi Raaja"	Hamsalekha	Hemanth Kumar
6.	"Onde Kerili"	G. P. Rajarathnam	L. N. Shastry
7.	"Olave Mandaaravaythu"	K. Kalyan	Rajesh Krishnan, Nanditha
8.	"Kaaya Vacha Manasa"	Jayatheertha	L. N. Shastry, Shreya Ghoshal
9.	"Chinna Ninna Bali Seralu"	K. Kalyan, Jayatheertha	Rajesh Krishnan, Shreya Ghoshal

== Reception ==
=== Critical response ===
A critic from The Times of India scored the film at 4 out of 5 stars and said, "While Srikanth impresses with a lively performance, Akanksha is amazing, with good expressions and a pleasant smile. The Rangayana Raghu-Veena Sundar duo moves one to tears. Nazer, Sharan and Sadhu Kokila have done justice to their roles." Satish Shile from Deccan Herald wrote, "Srikanth is impressive in his debut. Rangayana Raghu’s performance is remarkable. Deva’s score is soothing. Jayatirtha deserves appreciation for doing justice to one of G P Rajarathnam’s popular songs and conceptualising a song with the theme of conserving greenery. A watchable movie." A critic from Bangalore Mirror wrote, "The dialogues are average, and could have been crisp. Srikanth does justice to the money his producer-father has poured for the film. Besides critical acclaim, Olave Mandara has all the potential for making it big at the box office. Go for an enthralling journey."

== Awards and nominations ==
2011 Bangalore Times Film Awards

- Promising Newcomer (Male) – Srikanth

1st SIIMA Awards

- Best Male Debutant (Kannada) – Srikanth
- Best Female Debutant (Kannada) – Aakanksha Mansukhani
