= Manasugula Mathu Madhura =

2008 Indian Kannada-language film

Manasugala Mathu Madhura
- Directed by: Manju Maskalmatti
- Written by: Manju Maskalmatti
- Story by: Manju Maskalmatti
- Produced by: M Srinivas Kengeri
- Starring: Anand; Hariprriya
- Cinematography: H C Venu
- Edited by: Shashikumar
- Music by: K. Kalyan
- Production company: M L Enterprises
- Release date: March 7, 2008
- Running time: 161 minutes
- Country: India
- Language: Kannada

Manasugala Mathu Madhura is a 2008 Indian Kannada-language romance film written and directed by Manju Maskalmatti, making his debut. Produced by M Srinivas Kengeri, it features Anand and Hariprriya in the lead roles. The supporting cast includes Avinash and Mukyamanthri Chandru. The score and soundtrack for the film is by K. Kalyan and the cinematography is by H C Venu.

== Cast ==
- Anand as Sagar
- Hariprriya as Sangeetha
- Avinash
- Mukhyamantri Chandru as Madappa
- Bhavya
- Pavitra Lokesh
- Rekha Das
- Vaijanath Biradar
- Layendra
- Muguru Suresh

== Soundtrack ==
Manasugala Mathu Madhura

Soundtrack album by K. Kalyan
- Genre: Feature film soundtrack
- Language: Kannada
- Label: Anand Audio
- Producer: M L Enterprises

The film's background score and the soundtrack were composed and written by K. Kalyan. The music rights were acquired by Anand Audio.

All lyrics are written by K. Kalyan.

Tracklist
No.	Title	Singer(s)	Length
1.	"Nanna Ammana Melaane"	Anuradha Sriram
2.	"Hadinelu Chaithrada Hudugi"	S. P. Balasubrahmanyam
3.	"Preethiyalli Eno Ide"	Rajesh Krishnan, Aishwarya Kalyan
4.	"Thaala Thammate Dolu"	Vijay Aras, Archana Iyer
5.	"Goodu Bitta Hakkige"	Rajesh Krishnan, Divya Raghavan
6.	"Ninna Kannige Ondu"	Rajesh Krishnan, Sinchan Dixith
