= Amruthamathi =

- Directed by: Baraguru Ramachandrappa
- Written by: Baraguru Ramachandrappa
- Based on: Yashodhara Charite by Janna
- Produced by: Puttanna
- Starring: Hariprriya; Kishore; Tilak Shekar
- Cinematography: Nagaraj Adavani
- Edited by: Suresh Urs
- Music by: Shamitha Malnad
- Production company: Inchara Puttanna Productions
- Distributed by: Amazon Prime Video
- Release date: 7 May 2025
- Running time: 120 minutes
- Country: India
- Language: Kannada

Amruthamathi is a 2025 Indian Kannada-language drama film written and directed by Baraguru Ramachandrappa. The film stars Hariprriya, in the titular role alongside Kishore and Tilak Shekar in pivotal roles. The film is based on the play Yashodhara Charite written by Janna. The film is produced by Puttannna of Inchara Puttanna Productions. The film was screened at several international film festivals and was released on 7 May 2025 on Amazon Prime Video on rental basis.

== Plot ==
In the city of Ujjayini, King Yashaugha and his queen Chandramati had a son named Yashodhara. His beloved was a woman named Amruthamathi. When Yashaugha grew old, he crowned his son and retired to the forest for penance. Yashodhara and Amruthamathi continued their lives in mutual affection.

One night, while the couple was lying in bed, Amruthamathi heard a tune sung by Ashtavankara in the nearby horse stable. Instantly, she developed feelings for him and became eager to see and eventually unite with him. The next morning, she sent her maid to visit him. Upon seeing thecrooked and deformed man the maid was horrified and quickly returned.

When Amruthamathi, who was desperately in love, asked her maid about him, the maid mockingly replied, ‘How did someone find and fall for such a god of love?’ Amruthamathi, blinded by desire, misunderstood the sarcasm and still wished to know more about his appearance. When she heard descriptions of Ashtavakara's physical deformities, she consoled herself by saying, ‘Even a crooked man can give pleasure perhaps he’s better than the handsome ones.’

She then bribed her maid to arrange a meeting and gradually began an affair with Ashtavankara, slowly drifting away from Yashodhara. When Yashodhara sensed something was wrong, he decided to investigate. He secretly followed Amruthamathi one night and discovered the truth of her affair. Enraged, he initially thought of killing both her and her lover, but regaining his composure, he returned without harming them.

The next day, Amruthamathi came to know that her secret had been discovered. Amruthamathi, learning of this, invited both the king and queen to a farewell feast by poisoning the laddu. Later her maid convinces Amruthamathi by saying that when the king spotted you with Ashtavakara he did not kill you and now you do this is not right. Amruthamathi learns her mistake and later leaves the kingdom and starts to lead a normal life.

== Cast ==
- Hariprriya as Amruthamathi
- Kishore as Yashodhara
- Tilak Shekar as Ashtavankara
- Pramila Joshai as Chandramthi
- Sundar Raj as Yashougha
- Supriya Rao
- Ambarish Sarangi
- Vathsala Mohan
- D.L. Lakshmi Narayan

== Soundtrack ==
Amruthamathi

Soundtrack album by Shamitha Malnad
- Released: 2020
- Recorded: 2020
- Genre: Feature film soundtrack
- Length: 19:33
- Language: Kannada
- Label: Jhankar Music
- Producer: Shamitha Malnad

Music composed by Shamitha Malnad. First were released on 11 February 2020.

Tracklist
No.	Title	Lyrics	Singer(s)	Length
1.	"Sukha Yellarigellaithava"	Folk	Shamitha Malnad	4:53
2.	"Kudure Kudure"	Baraguru Ramachandrappa	Khasim Ali	4:53
3.	"Yenaayitho Olage"	Baraguru Ramachandrappa	[Rajesh Krishnan]]	4:35
4.	"Yaaru Melo Yaaru Keelo"	Folk	Jogi Sunitha	5:12

== Production and release ==
The film began production in 2019 with Hariprriya on board as the lead. The film completed the shoot and dubbing by the end of 2019. Later the film was screened at various international film festivals and gained acclaim. Due to COVID-19 pandemic the release of the film was delayed and later the film was released on Amazon Prime Video on rental basis on 7 May 2025.
