= Ranna (film) =

2015 film directed by Nanda Kishore

- Promotional poster
- Directed by: Nanda Kishore
- Screenplay by: Nanda Kishore
- Based on: Attarintiki Daredi (Telugu) by Trivikram Srinivas
- Produced by: M. Chandrashekar
- Starring: Sudeepa; Prakash Raj; Rachita Ram; Haripriya; Madhoo
- Cinematography: Sudhakar S. Raj
- Edited by: K. M. Prakash
- Music by: V. Harikrishna
- Production company: Sri Nimishamba Productions
- Distributed by: Sri Gokul Films
- Release date: 4 June 2015
- Running time: 152 minutes
- Country: India
- Language: Kannada
- Budget: ₹18 crore
- Box office: ₹30.80 crore

Ranna is a 2015 Indian Kannada-language action comedy film directed by Nanda Kishore. The film features an ensemble cast including Kichcha Sudeep, Prakash Raj, Rachita Ram, Haripriya, Madhoo, Devaraj, Avinash, Sharath Lohitashwa, and Sadhu Kokila. It is an official remake of the 2013 Telugu film Attarintiki Daredi.

The music was composed by V. Harikrishna with cinematography by Sudhakar S. Raj and editing by K. M. Prakash. The film released on 4 June 2015 to receive mixed reviews from critics, but it was declared successful at the box office.

== Plot ==
In Zurich, wheelchair-using business tycoon Sharat Chandra reveals to his grandson, Bhargav Nanda, his wish to mend relations with his estranged daughter Saraswathi, whom he disowned for marrying Prakash against his wishes. Determined to reconcile the family before Sharat Chandra's 80th birthday, Bhargav travels to Hyderabad, India. Disguised as a driver named Chandu, he earns the trust of Prakash, who has suffered a heart attack, and his family by admitting Prakash to the hospital.

Bhargav, posing as Chandu, is hired as a driver by Saraswathi and befriends her eldest daughter, Indira, while Saraswathi’s second daughter, Rukmini, grows suspicious of him and his friend Laxmi, Prakash's nurse. Saraswathi discloses to Bhargav that she is aware of who he is and warns him from doing anything with an intent to take her back to Sharat Chandra whom she refuses to forgive as the latter shot Prakash in his arm in a fit of rage when they got married after eloping. Bhargav saves Indira from a suicide attempt and she divulges that she was trying to run away with Rohith, whom Bhargav assumed to be the kidnapper. Indira requests Bhargav to bring Rohith to her as he is being forced to marry Neelamani, daughter of a fierce factionist Veerappa, the very next day and Bhargav obliges to her plea.

Bhargav and Laxmi travel to Siddhappa’s village to retrieve Rohith, but Rukmini inadvertently falls into their jeep and suffers from amnesia. To protect her, Bhargav pretends to be her lover, whom she ran away with against her mother’s wishes. Bhargav and Laxmi successfully rescue Rohith, but are pursued by Siddhappa and his men. During a confrontation, Rukmini regains her memory. Siddhappa then confronts Prakash and Saraswathi, demanding compensation for the damage caused to her daughter and their reputation. To prevent further conflict, Saraswathi offers to get Rukmini married to Siddhappa’s elder son and Prakash dismisses Bhargav from his job. Rukmini confesses her love for Bhargav, which is overheard by her cousin.

Bhaskar, an affluent NRI and Siddhappa's nephew, arrives as a guest at Saraswathi’s home. Saraswathi reveals to her assistant Murthy that Bhaskar was her previous assistant, who had become wealthy by discovering diamonds in a plot he bought in Uganda with the ₹2 lakh he stole from her. Bhargav traps Bhaskar, who has a penchant for women and desires to marry Rukmini and joins him as his assistant, entering Saraswathi's residence with his support.

Bhaskar's conspiracies to get close to Rukmini are constantly thwarted by Bhargav who takes Rukmini to the railway station for eloping to Chennai apparently. Siddhappa's men arrive at the station after learning from Rukmini's cousin about her love for Bhargav but the latter thrashes them and Rukmini perceives Bhargav's true identity and his intentions. Prakash arrives at the station and attempts to shoot Bhargav. Bhargav wonders that if Sharat Chandra was wrong at that time for shooting Prakash then why is the latter doing the same right now. Bhargav reflects on Sharat Chandra’s past actions and reveals that after Saraswathi eloped with Prakash, Sharat Chandra, overwhelmed with guilt, accidentally killed Bhargav’s mother Pooja while trying to shoot himself. Despite this tragedy, Bhargav and his father had forgiven Sharat Chandra.

Realizing their errors, Prakash and Saraswathi reconcile with Bhargav and agree to mend their relationship with Sharat Chandra. Bhaskar, seeking revenge, kidnaps Rukmini, but Bhargav and Laxmi rescue her. Bhaskar discovers that the Ugandan government has seized his wealth, leaving him with only ₹2 lakh. Saraswathi travels to Zurich with her family, publicly supporting Sharat Chandra during a board meeting and endorsing Bhargav as the new CEO of the company.

The film concludes with Bhaskar resuming his position as Saraswathi’s assistant, and Sharat Chandra expressing his affection for Bhargav, solidifying the family’s reconciliation and unity as the entire family eat together happily.

== Cast ==
- Sudeepa as Bhargava Chandra / Chandu
- Prakash Raj as Sharat Chandra, Bhargava's grandfather
- Rachita Ram as Rukmini, Saraswathi's daughter
- Haripriya as Indira, Saraswathi's daughter
- Madhoo as Saraswathi, Sharat Chandra's daughter
- Devaraj as Prakash, Saraswathi's Husband
- Avinash as Udaya Chandra, Bhargava's father
- Sharath Lohitashwa as Veerappa
- Sadhu Kokila as Bhaskar, a rich NRI
- Chikkanna as Nurse Laxmi Narayana, Bhargava's friend
- Mandya Ramesh as Moorthy
- Tabla Nani as Bhargava's PA#1
- Sathyajith as Om Shakthi
- Muniraju as Bhargava's PA#2
- Keerthiraj as Sharat Chandra's PA#1
- Dr. Nagesh as Sharat Chandra's PA#2
- Kuri Prathap as Bhaskar's assistant
- Nanda Kishore as Special Appearance in song "Seereli Hudugeena"
- Priyamani as Special Appearance in song "What to Do"
- Sonia Agarwal as Special Appearance in song "What to Do"
- Varalaxmi Sarathkumar as Special Appearance in song "What to Do"
- Nikita Thukral as Special Appearance in song "What to Do"
- Sparsha Rekha as Special Appearance in song "What to Do"

== Production ==
Rachita Ram was cast for the role portrayed by Samantha Ruth Prabhu in the original, while Haripriya was signed to reprise the role of Pranitha Subhash. Former lead actress Madhoo was selected for a pivotal role in the film, which was originally played by Nadhiya. The team suggested her to watch Attarintiki Daredi but Madhoo chose not to, stating that she did not want to be influenced by Nadhiya but wanted to "understand and interpret the role my way". In early October, it was reported that Prakash Raj was also a part of the cast.

Earlier speculated titles for the film were Rayaru Bandaru Atteya Manege, Sanjeeva Sarovara, Rayabhaari, Bhageeratha and Bhargava. The film was named Ranna in September 2014, although the title had been registered by Psycho director Devdutta, later the title was purchased for Rs. 5 lakhs.

The first schedule of Ranna was completed in Hyderabad. The second schedule of the film began on 16 September 2014. In early October, a shooting was held at Rockline Studio. The unit had planned to shoot a song sequence at Hong Kong which later shifted to Italy, owing to the Chinese New Year celebration rush at the former place. The movie was released on 4 June and received commercial and critical acclaim for Sudeepa's performance.

== Soundtrack ==
Ranna

Soundtrack album by V. Harikrishna
- Released: 16 April 2015
- Recorded: D Beats studio, Bangalore
- Genre: Feature film soundtrack
- Length: 20:14
- Label: D Beats Music world
- Producer: V. Harikrishna

V. Harikrishna chronology
Rana Vikrama (2015)	Ranna (2015)	Mr. Airavata (2015)

V. Harikrishna composed the film's background score and music for its soundtrack collaborating with Sudeepa for the fourth time. The soundtrack album was released on 15 April 2015 with the composer's label D-Beats acquiring the audio rights.

Track listing
No.	Title	Lyrics	Singer(s)	Length
1.	"Babbar Sher"	V. Nagendra Prasad	Devi Sri Prasad
2.	"Seereli Hudugeena"	Yogaraj Bhat	Vijay Prakash
3.	"What to Do"	Yogaraj Bhat	Vijay Prakash
4.	"Thithli Thithli"	K. Kalyan	Tippu, Sangeetha Ravindranath
5.	"Jagadoddharana"	Purandara Dasa	Karthik, Vani Harikrishna
6.	"Ranna Theme"

== Release ==
Ranna's distribution rights for the entire Karnataka region were acquired by Sri Gokul Films for ₹25 crore (US$2.6 million).

== Awards and nominations ==
IIFA Utsavam

- Best Music Director - Kannada (2015) - V. Harikrishna - nominated

IBNLive Movie Awards

- Best Actor South (2015) - Sudeepa - nominated

63rd Filmfare Awards South

- Critics Best Actress – Kannada (2015) - Rachita Ram - won
- Best Actress - Kannada (2015) - Rachita Ram - nominated
- Best Supporting Actress - Kannada (2015) - Madhoo - nominated

5th South Indian International Movie Awards

- Best Actress - Kannada (2015) - Rachita Ram - won
