= Honeymoon (Indian TV series) =

Indian drama television series

- Promotional poster
- Genre: Comedy
- Created by: Sakkath Studios
- Written by: Nagabhushana
- Screenplay by: Nagabhushana; Sakkath Studios
- Story by: RJ Pradeep
- Directed by: Vikram Yoganand; Sakkath Studios Creative Team
- Starring: Nagabhushana; Sanjana Anand
- Music by: Vasuki Vaibhav
- Country of origin: India
- Original language: Kannada
- No. of seasons: 1
- No. of episodes: 6

Production
- Executive producer: Raghu Mayanna
- Producers: Niveditha Shivarajkumar; Sakkath Studios
- Production locations: Alleppey, Kerala
- Cinematography: Shreesha Kuduvalli; Rahul Roy
- Editor: Pradeep Nayak
- Running time: 30 minutes
- Production companies: Shree Muthu Cine Services; Sakkath Studios

Original release
- Network: Voot Select
- Release: 20 May 2022 – present

Honeymoon is an Indian Kannada-language erotic comedy series created and produced by Sakkath Studios and it premiered on Voot. Series is first venture of Shiva Rajkumar's production house Shree Muthu Cine Services. Actor Nagabhushana co-wrote the series and features in the lead in the series with Sanjana Anand. Directed by Vikram Yoganand, director of ‘Dr PAL’ web series, Heegondhu Dina and Kushka (film) movie. The series tells the story of a newly-wed couple, on their honeymoon in Kerala. Series completed in 2019 and released the Telugu dubbed in version in aha while Original Kannada version released on Voot Select on 20 May 2022.

== Cast ==
- Nagabhushana as Praveen
- Sanjana Anand as Tejaswini
- Pawan Kumar as new Friend in Bar
- Vasuki Vaibhav as Photographer
- Anand Ninasam as Tejaswini's uncle
- Mahadev as Travel agent
- Apoorva Bharadwaj as Daisy
- Poorna Mysore as Tejaswini's friend
- Karthik as Taxi driver
- Archana Kotige as Jyothi

== Episodes ==
No. overall	No. in season	Title	Written by	Original release date
1	1	"Praveen weeds Tejaswini"	Nagabhushan	20 June 2022
1	2	"Praveen gears up for honeymoon"	Nagabhushan	20 June 2022
1	3	"Praveen is devastated"	Nagabhushan	20 June 2022
1	4	"Praveen Tejaswini's romantic dinner"	Nagabhushan	20 June 2022
1	5	"Praveen meets Daisy"	Nagabhushan	20 June 2022
1	6	"Praveen Tejaswini reconcile"	Nagabhushan	20 June 2022

== Productions ==
Kannada veteran actor Shiva Rajkumar started Shree Muthu Cine Services with his daughter Niveditha Shivrajkumar suggestion for making content based Kannada web series.

Niveditha Shivrajkumar joined hands with RJ Pradeep from Sakkath Studios to make new webseries. Initially decided that series will be directed Vikram Yoganand, director of ‘Dr PAL’ web series Heegondhu Dina and Kushka (film) movie. Production house decided to name series as "Honeymoon" with seven episodes but later decided to make six episodes series.

Series is written by Nagabhushana, an actor who is mostly known for his humour sketches on YouTube. In addition to the writing, Nagabhushana also plays the lead character in the series. Sanjana Anand selected to plays the female lead, who debuted in 2019 Kannada film Chemistry of Kariyappa.

First phase of shooting done in Bengaluru, while the second is likely to be held in an interesting locality. The production house has roped in Vasuki Vaibhav to score music and Rahul Roy for cinematography. Later hired Shreesha Kuduvalli as additional cinematographer.

Most of the shooting done in Alleppey, Kerala. Shooting completed in June 2019. According to the production house, Honey Moon is the first webseries to be shot in Kerala.

== Release ==
Series trailer released on 12 May 2022 by Dr. Shiva Rajkumar. Announces series will releases on 20 May 2022 in Voot Select.

The six episode first season premiered on 20 May 2022 on Voot. Telugu dubbed version released on 27 November 2020 in aha. while Original Kannada version delayed several times and finally released on 20 May 2022.
