= Mata (2022 film) =

South Indian drama movie

- Theatrical release poster
- Directed by: Ravindra Venshi
- Screenplay by: Ravindra Venshi
- Dialogues by: L. R. Jeevan; Ravindra Venshi
- Based on: Mata Margadarshana by Santosh Davanagere
- Produced by: Ramesh Ramanand
- Starring: Santhosh Davanagere
- Cinematography: Jeevan Gowda
- Edited by: C. Ravichandran
- Music by: Sriguru (songs); V. Manohar (score)
- Production company: VR Combines
- Release date: 18 November 2022
- Country: India
- Language: Kannada

Mata (transl. Monastery) is a 2022 Indian Kannada-language biographical drama film directed by Ravindra Venshi starring Santhosh Davanagere. The film was released to negative reviews.

== Cast ==
- Santhosh Davanagere as Santhosh
- Sanjana Burli
- Ashrith Mallengad
- Guruprasad
- Sadhu Kokila
- Mandya Ramesh
- Tabla Nani
- Sharath Lohitashwa
- Bank Janardhan
- Raju Talikote
- Vaijanath Biradar
- Moogu Suresh

== Production ==
The film was shot in 149 days in 70 mutts across Karnataka. Since Guruprasad directed and acted in the 2006 film of the same name, he was brought aboard this film. He was apprehensive of naming the film Mata, so he suggested names such as Kaavi, Gadduge and Mathadeesha.

== Reception ==
A critic from The Hindu wrote that "Throughout the film, the filmmaker tests the patience of the audience with statements that need more substantiation. The silver lining is that the audience gets a free tour of some religious Matas in Karnataka". A critic from The Times of India rated the film two-and-a-half out of five stars and wrote that "The core element of the movie, monasteries, is hardly touched upon and fails to live up to expectations. Nor does it delve deep into the subject".
