= Vikram Yoganand =

Indian film director

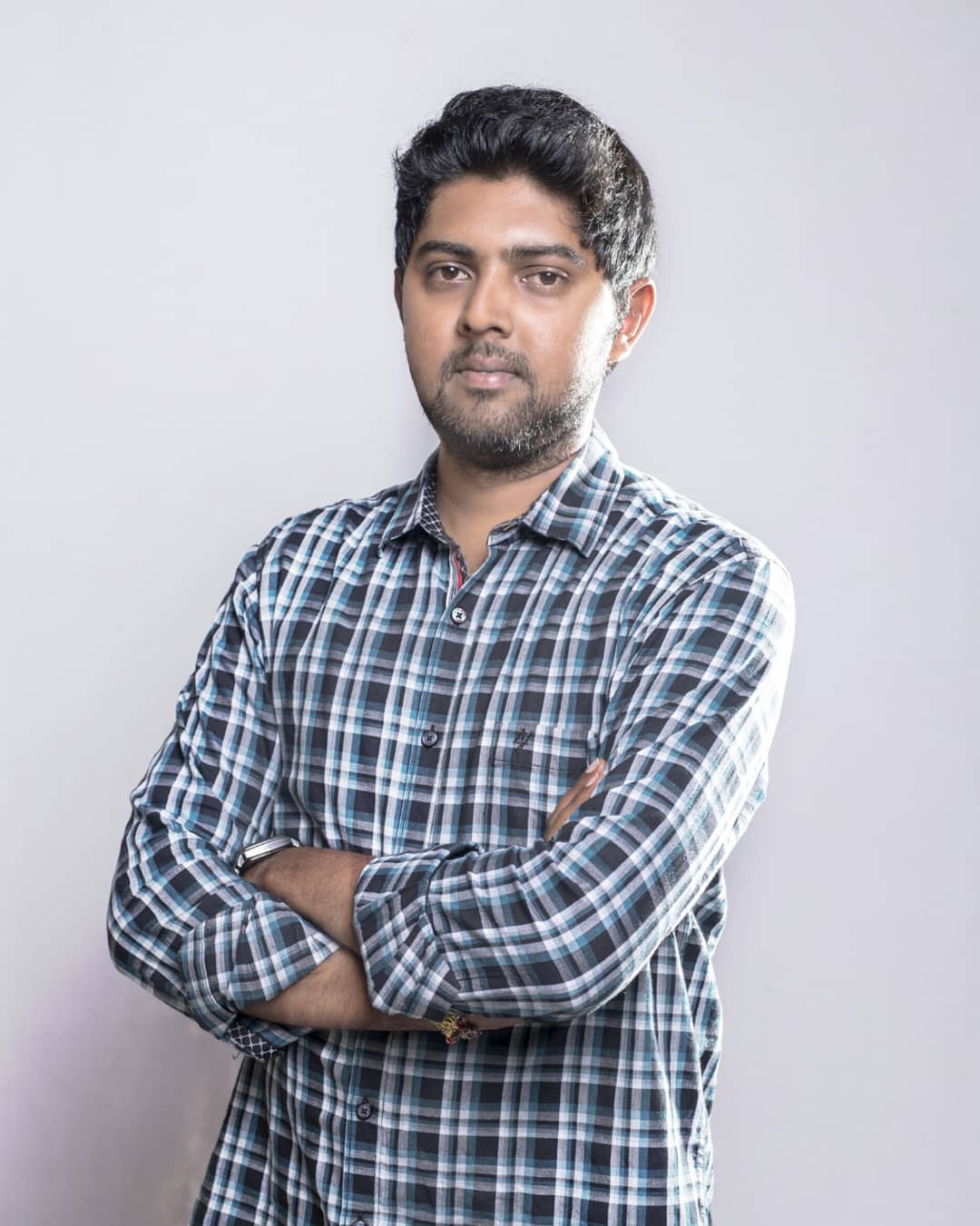
- Born: Bangalore, Karnataka, India
- Occupations: Director, Editor, Cinematographer, Producer
- Years active: 2009 to present
- Spouse: Shwetha Yoganand (m.2015)

Vikram Yoganand is an Indian film director, editor, writer, cinematographer and commercial ad maker predominantly working in the Kannada film industry.

After graduating, Vikram started making short films and music videos. Miley Somehow was his earliest work shot in and around Bangalore, completed in 2013. After a few successful projects with Chandan Shetty, he directed the feature film Heegondhu Dina, starring Sindhu Loknath under his company Smart Screen Productions.

After Heegondhu Dina, Vikram Yoganand directed a crime comedy called Kushka. Vikram says that what is unique about this multi-starrer, is the film's colour palette.

== Filmography ==
Year	Film	Language	Director	Cinematographer	Editor	Producer	Cast
2013	Miley Somehow	Hindi	Yes	Yes	Yes		Mehdi Ali Khan, Amisha Ambekar
2016	Sri Chakram	Kannada		Yes	Yes		
2017	BB5	Kannada		Yes			Poornachandra Mysore, Radhika Chetan
2018	Heegondhu Dina	Kannada	Yes	Yes	Yes		Sindhu Loknath, Guruprasad, Praveen Tej
2018	Dr Pal	Kannada	Yes	Yes	Yes		Kailash Pal
2018	I am 30	Kannada		Yes			Sindhu Loknath
2020	Kushka	Kannada	Yes	Yes	Yes	Yes	Guruprasad
2020	Honeymoon	Kannada	Yes				Nagabhushana, Sanjana Anand
2025	Kapati	Kannada		Yes	Yes		Sukrutha Wagle
2025	Suli	Kannada		Yes			Sanath S, Chaitra
