= Kushka (film) =

Indian Kannada drama film by Vikram Yoganand

- First look poster
- Directed by: Vikram Yoganand
- Screenplay by: Balraj
- Produced by: Prathap Reddy; Madhu Gowda; Kailash Pal
- Starring: Guruprasad; Sanjana Anand
- Cinematography: Vikram Yoganand
- Edited by: Vikram Yoganand
- Music by: Ananth Kishen
- Production companies: Smart Screen Productions; PM Productions; Ira Films
- Release date: 13 March 2020
- Country: India
- Language: Kannada

Kushka (transl. Biriyani Rice) is a 2020 Indian Kannada-language drama film, directed and edited by Vikram Yoganand, produced by Prathap Reddy, Madhu Gowda and Kailash Pal under the banner of Smart Screen Productions and PM Productions. The film follows Heegondhu Dina (2018) and features writer and actor Guruprasad, along with Kailash Pal and Sanjana Anand. The director Yoganand is also credited as cinematographer. The songs are composed by Abhilash Gupta.

The film derives its name from the Khuska Rice, which is a popular dish from Southern India. It was theatrically released on 13 March 2020.

The movie is inspired by films like Snatch, Delhi Belly, Hungama, films of the cryper crime comedy genre, which is new in South Indian movies.

== Cast ==
- Guruprasad
- Kailash Pal
- Chandu Gowda
- Sanjana Anand
- Shobraj
- Anil Kumar as Google Swamiji
- Madhuri Braganza
- Arun Kumar.

== Promotion and release ==
The official teaser was launched by Smart Screen Productions on 20 January 2020.

It was theatrically released on 13 March 2020.

== Soundtrack ==
Kushka

Soundtrack album by Abhilash Gupta
- Released: 12 February 2020
- Studio: Root 35 Studio & Sagar Akash Studio Bangalore
- Genre: Feature film soundtrack

The soundtrack composed by Abhilash Gupta and lyrics by Rahul Dit-O and Ramakrishna Ranagatti.

Track List
No.	Title	Lyrics	Singer(s)	Length
1.	"Simple Saluge"	Ramakrishna Ranagatti	Vijay Prakash, Saanvii Shetty, Abhilash Gupta	3:50
2.	"Taasha"	Rahul Dit-O	Rahul Dit O, Mahesh Jude Pereira, Sangeetha Rajeev	4:00
