= By Two Love =

2022 film

- Theatrical release poster
- Directed by: Hari Santhosh
- Written by: Hari Santhosh
- Produced by: Nisha Venkat Konanki
- Starring: Dhanveerah; Sreeleela
- Cinematography: Mahen Simha
- Edited by: K. M. Prakash
- Music by: B. Ajaneesh Loknath
- Production company: KVN Productions
- Release date: 18 February 2022
- Running time: 141 minutes
- Country: India
- Language: Kannada

By Two Love is a 2022 Indian Kannada-language romance drama film written and directed by Hari Santhosh. Produced by KVN Productions, it stars Dhanveerah and Sreeleela. The film tells the story of two youngsters in Bangalore, Balu and Leela, who lead an independent life and don't resonate with the traditional idea of marriage and children. The film has score and soundtrack composed by B. Ajaneesh Loknath.

The film was released theatrically on 18 February 2022.

== Plot ==
Balu is a die-hard Sachin Tendulkar fan, who has a problem with his family since his father has married for the second time. Leelu is unhappy with her younger brother's conduct in life. Yet, their mother keeps taking the side of her younger brother.

Balu and Leela, hailing from different towns, decide to leave their respective homes and land up in the cosmopolitan city of Bangalore, looking for jobs. They accidentally meet in a cab and get into a fight. Unfortunately, the two land jobs at the same office, a professional matrimonial company Mr & Mrs Matrimony. Time passes by, Balu and Leelu become good friends, and eventually, fall in love with each other. Balu and Leelu decide to take their life to the next stage and test themselves and find whether they are fit enough to start a family. Their quest lead them to adopt an infant child and start a live-in relationship and names the child as Puppy.

Initially, life is rosy, but it doesn't stay that way. In the end, they realize that running a family isn't easy and part ways, leaving Puppy to its fate. When they reach their hometowns. Balu finds that he misunderstood his father where he reconciles with him and Balu reveals about Leelu and Puppy to his father and Leelu also tells the same to her mother. The parents advice them to reconcile with each other. Balu and Leelu meet and apologize to each other and search for Puppy, but to no avail. An auto driver, who gave Puppy to Balu and Leelu finds Puppy and brings him to Balu and Leelu, thus reconciling with each other.

In a mid-credits scene, Balu and Leelu get married in presence of their parents, friends and Puppy.

== Cast ==
- Dhanveerah as Balakrishna aka Balu
- Sreeleela as Leela aka Leelu
- Pavitra Lokesh as Leela's mother
- Achyuth Kumar as Balu's father
- Rangayana Raghu as Auto driver
- Shivaraj K R Pete as Shiva, Balu's friend
- Nakul Sharma as Siddhu, Leela's younger brother
- Tabla Nani as House owner
- Sadhu Kokila as Kalyan Kumar, Managing director of Mr & Mrs Matrimony
- Hemanth Shetty as Balu's friend

== Production ==
The film was announced in December 2020 with Dhaveerrah and Sreeleela paired opposite each other. Santosh stated that he wrote By Two Love from his own experiences about the idea of marriage. Filming was completed in April 2021, and Santosh confirmed that he had begun pre-production work of By Two Love's Telugu remake under the production of Sai Korrapati's Vaaraahi Chalana Chitram.

== Release ==
By Two Love was released theatrically on 18 February 2022.

== Soundtrack ==
The soundtrack album has four singles composed by B. Ajaneesh Loknath, and released on Anand Audio.

Track listings
No.	Title	Singer(s)	Length
1.	"I Hate Love"	B Ajaneesh Loknath, C R Bobby	3:43
2.	"Bytwo Bytwo"	Mano	3:20
3.	"Neene Neene"	Karthik	3:29
4.	"Huduga Hudugi"	Naveen Sajju	3:48
5.	"Pogadiro Ranga"	Chinmayi, Haricharan	3:56
Total length:			18:16

== Reception ==
Reviewing the film for The Times of India, Sunayana Suresh wrote: "The film has some interesting nuances of the frailties and complexities of the current generation, who prefer being detached and baggage free." The New Indian Express critic A. Sharadhaa called it a "roller coaster ride" which " shouldered on the two young actors." She stated that the film was an urban tale that ran on familiar territory. On technical aspects, Vijaya Karnataka reviewer Avinash G. Ram wrote: "Ajaneesh had the opportunity to make background music more effective. Full marks must be given to Mahen Simha's cinematography. Mahen has built the entire cinema with great ease [sic]"

Jagadish Anagdi of Deccan Herald termed it an "epic misfire." "The first half thoroughly tests our patience with too many unrelated scenes. It starts with an action sequence which, in no way, is linked to the plot. Double entendres are embarrassing.
