= Sanjana Anand =

Indian Actress

- Born: 28 March 1995 (age 31); Bangalore, Karnataka, India
- Occupation: Actress
- Years active: 2019–present

Sanjana Anand (born 28 March 1997) is an Indian actress who appears in Kannada films.

== Career ==
She made her debut with Chemistry of Kariyappa which was released in February 2019. Her second film, Male Billu, was released in July 2019. She appeared as the female lead in Kushka, which was released in February 2021 after being postponed due to the COVID-19 pandemic. She made her web-series debut in Honeymoon, which was directed by Vikram Yoganand.

She appeared as the female lead in Duniya Vijay's directorial debut Salaga, in Shokiwala opposite Ajay Rao, and in Kshatriya opposite Chiranjeevi Sarja. She was also reported to be one of the two lead actresses set to star opposite Nirup Bhandari in the romantic thriller, tentatively named Window Seat.

She was cast in Addhuri Lover but left the project in July 2021, due to scheduling conflicts.

== Filmography ==
=== Films ===
Year	Title	Role	Language	Notes	Ref
2019	Chemistry of Kariyappa	Chitra	Kannada		
2020	Kushka		Kannada		
2021	Salaga	Sanjana	Kannada		
2022	Shokiwala	Radha	Kannada		
2022	Window Seat	Maya	Kannada		
2022	Nenu Meeku Baga Kavalsinavaadini	Theju	Telugu		
2025	Royal	Sanjana	Kannada		
2025	Suthradaari	Herself	Kannada	Special appearance in "Dash Song"	
2025	Ekka	Nandini	Kannada		
2026	Hayagrriva	Aishwarya	Kannada		
2026	Bail		Kannada		
2026	Mudhol †		Kannada		
TBA	Full Bottle †	TBA	Telugu		
TBA	Tamma Sukhagamana Bayasuva †	TBA	Kannada		

=== Web series ===
Year	Title	Role	Language	Notes	Ref
2020	Honeymoon	Tejaswini	Kannada	VootSelect(Kannada), aha(Telugu)	
