= Tabla Nani =

Indian theatre and film actor

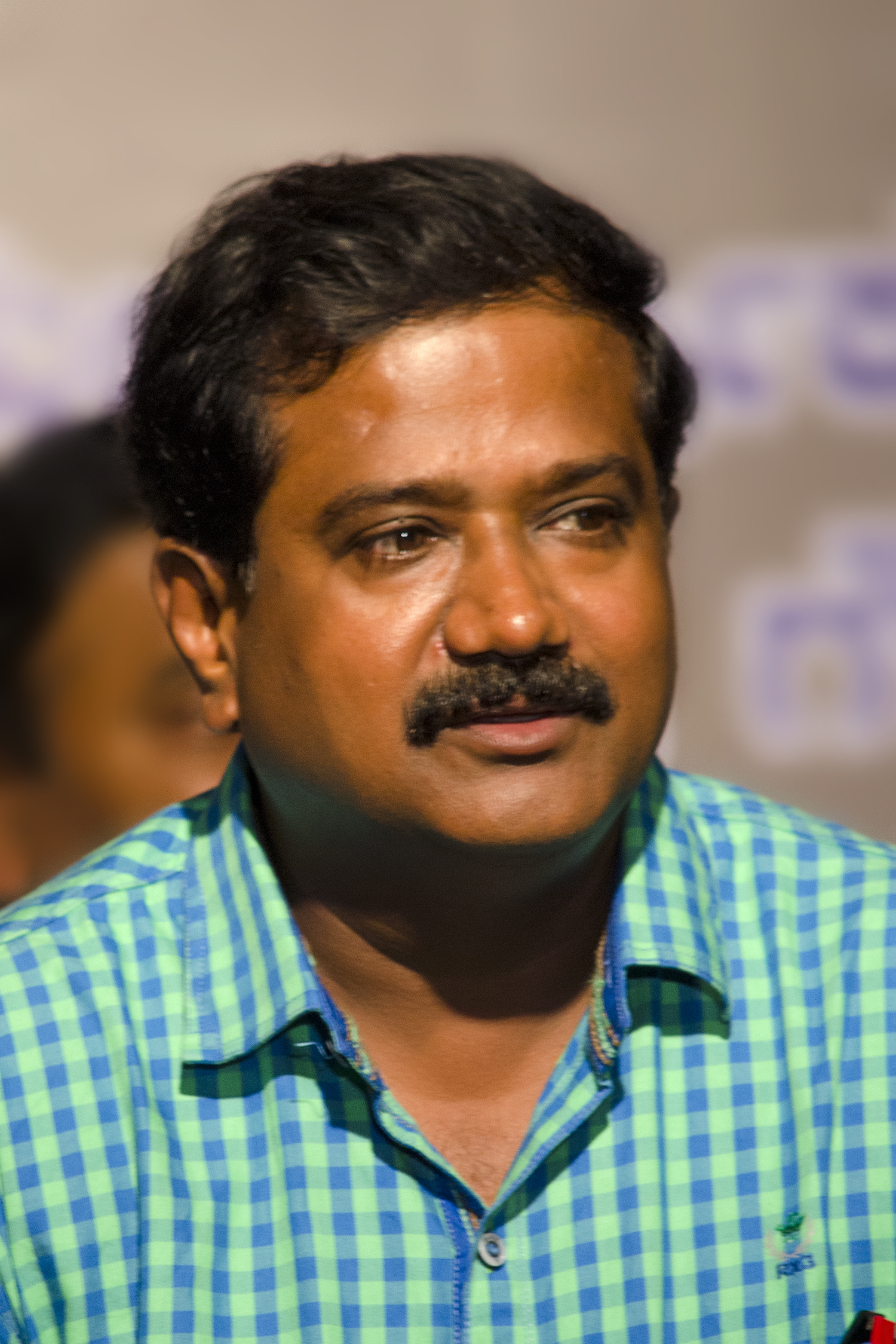
- Born: 1 June 1964 (age 62); Koratagere, Tumkur district, Karnataka, India
- Occupation: Actor
- Years active: 2006–present

Tabla Nani (born K A Lakshminarayana) is an Indian theatre and film actor who works primarily in Kannada cinema. He began his career as a supporting actor in the 2006 Kannada film Mata. His 2009 film Eddelu Manjunatha was positively reviewed.

== Career ==
A theatre actor, Nani began his film career with the 2006 Kannada film Mata. He was positively reviewed in the 2009 film, Eddelu Manjunatha and Rambo (2012). His film Akka Pakka was also positively reviewed.

== Partial filmography ==
- Mata (2006) - Venugopal
- Eddelu Manjunatha (2009) - Nani
- Vaare Vah (2010)
- Sanju Weds Geetha (2011)
- Kaanchana (2011) - Manja
- Maduve Mane (2011)
- Hudugaru (2011)
- 90 (2011)
- Lucky (2012)
- Addhuri (2012)
- Rambo (2012) - Prem Kumar
- Myna (2013)
- Akka Pakka (2013) - Bhuvan (Bukka)
- Ale (2013)
- Victory (2013) - Choornaananda
- Shathru (2013 film) (2013)
- Sweety Nanna Jodi (2013)
- Bhajarangi (2013)
- Devarane (2013)
- Director's Special (2013)
- Jeethu (2013)
- Rangan Style (2014)
- Chathurbhuja (2014)
- Huchudugaru (2014)
- Love Show (2014)
- Bahaddur (2014)
- Raja Rajendra (2015)
- Endendigu (2015)
- Ranna (2015) - Gowtham PA 1
- Bullet Basya (2015)
- Khaidi (2015)
- Mrugashira (2015)
- Patharagitthi (2015)
- Kotigobba 2 / Mudinja Ivana Pudi (2016)
- Mungaru Male 2 (2016)
- Mukunda Murari (2016) - Tabla Nani
- Beautiful Manasugalu (2017)
- Raaga (2017)
- Tiger (2017)
- Vaira (2017) - Ramayya
- Samyuktha 2 (2017) - Lecturer
- Nan Magale Heroine (2017)
- Chowka (2017)
- Jilebi (2017)
- Devrantha Manushya (2018)
- Krishna Tulasi (2018) - Cheluvarayaswamy
- Dhwaja (2018)
- Bhootayyana Mommaga Ayyu (2018)
- Victory 2 (2018)
- Raambo 2 (2018)
- Kismath (2018)
- Paradesi C/o London (2018)
- Chemistry Of Kariyappa (2019)
- Ammana Mane (2019)
- Gara (2019)
- Vyuha (2019)
- Ellidde Illi Tanaka (2019)
- Mane Maratakkide (2019)
- Kalidasa Kannada Meshtru (2019)
- Damayanthi (2019)
- Navelru... Half Boiled (2019)
- Odeya (2019)
- Chemistry of Kariyappa (2019)
- Ommomme (2020)
- Kotigobba 3 (2020)
- Nan Hesaru Kishora Yel Pass Yentu (2021)
- Wheelchair Romeo (2022) as Autoshankar
- Mata (2022)
- Appa I Love You (2024)
