= Hayagrriva =

2026 Kannada language film

- Poster
- Directed by: Raghukumar OR
- Written by: Raghukumar OR
- Starring: Dhanveer Gowda; Sanjana Anand
- Release date: 27 February 2026
- Country: India
- Language: Kannada

Hayagrriva is a 2026 Indian Kannada language film written and directed by Raghukumar OR. The film stars Dhanveer Gowda, Sanjana Anand, Sadhu Kokila in the lead role.

== Plot ==
In a future where myths become reality through science, mysterious deaths create chaos. Detective Arjun must solve the crimes while saving his marriage. A high-stakes investigation where ancient legends meet modern evolution.

== Cast ==
- Dhanveer Gowda as Detective Arjun
- Sanjana Anand as Aishwarya
- Sunil Rao
- Sadhu Kokila
- Ashwini Gowda as Police commissioner
- Ramesh Bhat
- Gilli Nata

== Reception ==
Susmita Sameera of The Times of India said that "Hayagrriva presents an intriguing serial-killer premise intertwined with mythological symbolism. While certain narrative choices slow its impact, the psychological depth of the antagonist and the core investigative thread sustain interest." A Shradhaa of Cinema Express said that "Hayagrriva presents its ideas with confidence, leaving space for the audience to decide how deeply they connect with them. That openness becomes part of the overall experience, elevating the mystery into a topic to ponder."
