= Chandan Achar =

Indian Kannada film actor

- Born: 2 August 1990 (age 36); Krishnarajanagara, Mysore, Karnataka, India
- Other name: Chandan
- Education: Maharaja's College
- Occupation: Actor
- Years active: 2012 – present

Chandan Achar (born 2 August 1990) is an Indian theatre and film actor who works in Kannada. He is known for his works in movies including Kirik Party and Chemistry of Kariyappa. For his performance in the film Kirik Party, he got SIIMA award for Best Actor in Supporting Role (Male) in 2017. He was also a contestant in the reality show of Bigg Boss Kannada (season 7).

== Early life ==
Born and raised in Krishnarajanagar Town, Mysore, Chandan was an alumnus student of Journalism and Mass Communication Department in Maharaja's College, Mysore. He got trained in Mandya Ramesh's institute Natana.

== Career ==
An active participant in drama and other activities in college days, Chandan first appeared in a small role in the Diganth starrer Kannada movie Parijatha in 2012. His first notable role was in the college drama Kirik Party in 2016. Then he acted in Mugulu Nage with Ganesh.

Chandan did his first movie as a lead in the 2019 movie ‛Chemistry of Kariyappa’. After Kirik Party, he again shared space with Rakshit Shetty in the multilingual Avane Srimannarayana. His next solo venture was Mangalavara Rajaadina which was released in March 2020.

Chandan was also a part of the popular reality show Bigg Boss Kannada (season 7) where he was a contestant and got evicted on the 99th day of the show.

== Filmography ==
=== As actor ===
Year	Film	Role	Notes
2010	Veera Parampare		
2012	Rambo	Terrorist	
2012	Parijatha		
2016	Kirik Party	Alexander Gabriel	
2017	Mugulu Nage	Pulakeshi's Friend	
2019	Chemistry of Kariyappa	Utthara Kumar	
2019	Avane Srimannarayana	Drama Artist	
2021	Mangalavara Rajaadina	Kumara	
2022	Bangalore Boys†	Manche Gowda	

=== As singer ===
Year	Film	Song	Co-singer	Music
2016	Kirik Party	"Lastu Benchina Party Nammadu"	Chintan Vikas, Varun Ramachandra, B. Ajaneesh Loknath	B. Ajaneesh Loknath

== Awards ==
Movie	Award	Category	Result	Ref.
Kirik Party	South Indian International Movie Award -SIIMA – 2017	Best Actor in Supporting Role (Male)	Won	
Kirik Party	IIFA Utsavam	Best Actor in A Supporting Role – Male	Nominated	
