= Body God =

2022 Indian film

- Directed by: Prabhu Srinivas
- Written by: Prabhu Srinivas; Karundhel Rajesh; Vyshak; Naveen Reddy
- Produced by: Prabhu Srinivas
- Starring: Manoj Kumaraswamy; Guruprasad
- Cinematography: Velmurugan
- Edited by: Ujwal Chandra
- Music by: Karan B Krupa
- Release date: 1 April 2022
- Country: India
- Language: Kannada

Body God is a 2022 Indian Kannada-language black comedy film produced and directed by Prabhu Srinivas, starring Manoj Kumaraswamy and Guruprasad with an ensemble supporting cast. Karan B Krupa composed the film's songs and background score. The story is written by Prabhu Srinivas and screenplay by Prabhu Srinivas, Co-director Vyshak, Karundhel Rajesh and Naveen Reddy of Akira fame. Prashanth Y N, Abhinandan Deshpriya and S.K.S penned the dialogues.

== Premise ==
Vasu, a middle-class man leading a complicated life, is appointed to look after Puttanna, a paralyzed and arrogant old man. When Puttanna mysteriously dies, Vasu covers the death and convinces everyone that Puttanna is alive. How long will it work?

== Cast ==
- Manoj Kumaraswamy as Vasu
- Guruprasad as Puttanna
- Padmaja Rao as Padma
- Prabhu Srinivas as Sync Seena
- Niranjan as Sub Inspector
- Ashwin as Mahesh
- Shankar Krishnamurthy as L.K.Balu
- Vageesh R Katti

== Production ==
Prabhu Srinivas and Dhananjay were originally supposed to collaborate for the film Daali. The film, however, was put on hold due to the COVID-19 pandemic as several scenes were to be shot outside Karnataka. Later, Prabhu Srinivas teamed up for Body God Kannada movie with Manoj Kumaraswamy and Guruprasad for this comedy entertainer.

== Music ==
The film's soundtrack album and score was composed by Karan B Krupa.

List of songs
No.	Title	Lyrics	Singer(s)	Length
1.	"Aresa Dankanaka"	S.K.S	Puneeth Rajkumar	4:22
2.	"Yeno Mayavo"	Venkatesh Kulkarni	Anuradha Bhat, Ajay Warrier	4:43
