= Chemistry of Kariyappa =

- Directed by: Kumaar L.
- Written by: Kumaar L.
- Produced by: Manjunath D. S.
- Starring: Tabla Nani; Chandan Achar; Sanjana Anand; Pranaya Murthy; Suchendra Prasad; Rockline Sudhakar
- Cinematography: Shiva Seena
- Edited by: Venkatesh UDV
- Music by: Arav Rishik
- Release date: 15 February 2019
- Running time: 125 minutes
- Country: India
- Language: Kannada

Chemistry of Kariyappa is a 2019 Indian Kannada language drama and comedy film written and directed by Kumaar L. It was produced by Manjunath D S.

The film stars Tabla Nani, Chandan Achar, Sanjana Anand, Pranaya Murthy, Suchendra Prasad and Rockline Sudhakar in the lead roles.

The music of the film is composed by Arav Rishik. Cinematography is done by Shiva Seena.

== Plot ==
The story is based on a true incident that occurred in the Karnataka region of Mandya. The plot centres around Tabla Nani, who cheerfully departs with his wife, son, and daughter-in-law, but not before troubles in his son's life develop. When the newlywed son's wife suspects him of being impotent, she files for divorce. The rest of the plot is around what the son will do to defend his wife's innocence in court, with the assistance of his father.

== Cast ==
- Sanjana Anand as Chitra
- Chandan Achar as Uttara Kumar
- Pranaya Murthy
- Tabla Nani as Kariyappa
- Suchendra Prasad
- Rockline Sudhakar as Broker

== Reception ==
The film received critical acclaim. The Times of India gave it 2 star out of 5.
