= Dhanveer Gowda =

Indian film actor

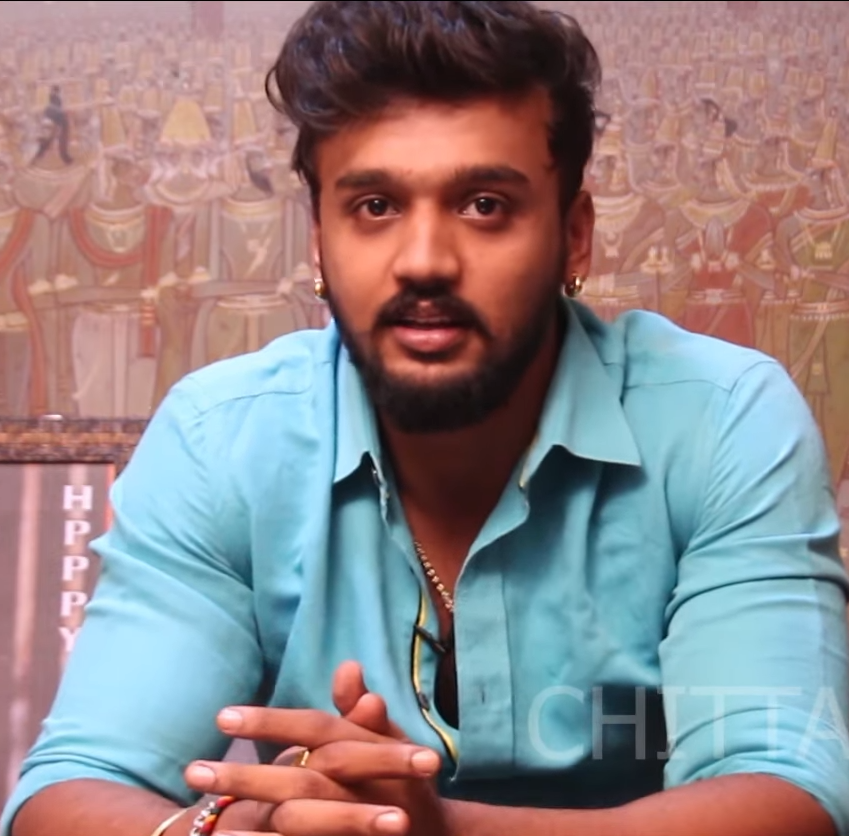
- Dhanveer in interview at Chittara
- Born: Hari Gowda; September 8, 1995; Bangalore, Karnataka
- Occupation: Actor
- Years active: 2019-present

Hari "Dhanveer" Gowda (born 8 September 1995) is an Indian actor, who works in Kannada Films. He started his career with the Kannada film Bazaar in 2019 and gained prominence with Kaiva in 2023.

== Life and career ==
Dhanveerah was born on 8 September 1995, to a Kannada family in Bangalore, Karnataka. He started his acting career with Bazaar where he paired opposite Aditi Prabhudeva. The film was directed by Simple Suni and released in 2019. His next film is titled as Kaiva.

== Filmography ==
Key
†	Denotes films that have not yet been released

Film
Year	Name	Role	Notes	Ref
2019	Bazaar	Kalki	Debut Film	
2022	By Two Love	Balakrishna		
2023	Kaiva	Kaiva		
2025	Vaamana	Guna		
2026	Hayagrriva	Arjun Hayagriva		
TBA	Bumper †	TBA	Filming	
