= Vaamana =

2025 Indian Kannada-language action film

- Theatrical release poster
- Directed by: Shankar Raman. S
- Written by: Shankar Raman. S
- Produced by: Chethan Kumar Gowda
- Starring: Dhanveer Gowda; Reeshma Nanaiah
- Cinematography: Mahendra Simha
- Edited by: Suresh Arumugam
- Music by: B. Ajaneesh Loknath
- Production company: Equinox Global Entertainment
- Release date: 10 April 2025
- Country: India
- Language: Kannada

Vaamana is a 2025 Indian Kannada-language action film directed by Shankar Raman S and produced by Chethan Kumar Gowda under Equinox Global Entertainments. The film stars Dhanveer Gowda and Reeshma Nanaiah in the lead roles. The soundtrack is composed by B. Ajaneesh Loknath, while the cinematography and editing was handled by Mahendra Simha and Suresh Arumugam.

== Plot ==
The film opens with Guna (Dhanveerrah), a quiet yet intense man working as a henchman for a powerful businessman. Beneath his stoic exterior lies a storm of betrayal and vengeance. His life takes a violent turn when he discovers that his employer, Karamlal (Adithya Menon), and local don Papanna (Sampath Raj) are involved in a conspiracy that destroyed his family years ago. Guna's mother (Tara) is central to his emotional arc. In a poignant flashback, she vows not to see her son until he purges the world of evil—a promise that becomes his driving force. Her restrained yet powerful performance adds gravitas to the narrative. As Guna spirals deeper into the underworld, his actions become a cry for justice rather than mere revenge. The police force, crippled by corruption, offers no help, forcing Guna to wage a lone war against a system built on fear and silence.

Nandini (Reeshma Nanaiah) enters as a beacon of hope and humanity in Guna's blood-soaked life. Their relationship is tender yet tragic, offering glimpses of the life Guna could have had. A birthday celebration scene amidst chaos underscores this contrast. The emotional turning point comes with the death of Guna's closest ally, Ravi. Soon after, a shocking revelation surfaces: Papanna, the antagonist, shares a hidden familial bond with Guna—a betrayal that scars both mother and son. This twist redefines Guna's quest, making it as much about redemption as revenge.

== Cast ==
- Dhanveer Gowda as Guna
- Reeshma Nanaiah as Nandini
- Sampath Raj as Papanna
- Adithya Menon as Karamlal
- Achyuth Kumar
- Tara
- Avinash
- Petrol Prasanna

== Soundtrack ==
B. Ajaneesh Loknath composed the soundtrack and background score.

Vaamana

Soundtrack album by B. Ajaneesh Loknath
- Released: 2023
- Studio: Kruthi Audios
- Genre: Feature film soundtrack
- Language: Kannada
- Label: A2 Music

Track list
No.	Title	Singer (s)	Length
1.	"Va Va Va Vaamana"	Shashank Sheshagiri	4:00
2.	"Muddu Rakshasi"	Vijay Prakash	3:39

== Release ==
Initially, the film was scheduled to be released in September 2023, but it was delayed and was theatrically released on 10 April 2025.

== Reception ==
Sridevi S. of The Times of India rated the film two-and-a-half out of five stars and wrote, "Vamana is a high-octane action drama, narrated with a non-linear screenplay, which does more harm than good. The film comes together only in the last 30 minutes as it stitches all the pieces together, but one has to sit through a lot of conflicts and confusion to reach till the peak moment." A. Sharadhaa of The New Indian Express wrote, "Director Shankar Raman avoids formulaic beats and crafts a story where action serves emotion, set in world that is gritty, morally complex, and far more grounded than typical mass cinema".
