= Mangalavara Rajaadina =

Indian Kannada-language romantic comedy film

- Directed by: Yuvin
- Written by: Yuvin
- Produced by: Team Trivarga
- Starring: Chandan Achar; Lasya Nagaraj
- Cinematography: Uday Leela
- Edited by: Madhu Thumbakere
- Music by: Prajoth D'sa
- Distributed by: Studio 18
- Release date: 5 February 2021
- Running time: 110 minutes
- Country: India
- Language: Kannada

Mangalavara Rajaadina is a 2021 Indian Kannada-language Romantic comedy film written and directed by Yuvin. Produced by Team Trivarga and distributed by Studio 18 Starring Chandan Achar and Lasya Nagaraj, with a music score by Prajoth D'sa and background score by Ritvik Muralidhar.

== Plot ==
Kumara is a barber, A School dropout who works with his father salon to carry on the family business. Their lower-middle-class existence is filled with loans and ideals. But Kumara one wish in life is to style the hair of superstar Kannada actor Kichcha Sudeepa. Kumara's friends and Abhi introduce him to Martin Luther who climes to be a close associate of Kannada superstar Sudeep and promises to help him fulfill his fanboy dream. Kumara shares his family story and friendship with Seetal and Abhi. Kumar's father was ill and Sudeep comes and save him at the end makes the story.

== Cast ==
- Chandan Achar as Kumara
- Lasya Nagaraj as Seetal
- Gopalkrishnan Deshpande as Madeva
- Rajnikanth as Abhi
- Jahangir as Martin Luther
- Sudeepa as Himself

== Music ==
Mangalavara Rajaadina

Soundtrack album by Prajoth D'sa
- Released: 2020
- Recorded: 2020
- Genre: Feature film soundtrack

Prajoth D'sa composed the title song, "Mangalavara Rajaadina". Background score was programmed by Rithvik muralidhar.

Track list
No.	Title	Lyrics	Singer(s)	Length
1.	"Mangalavara Rajaadina"	Yogaraj Bhat	Vijay Prakash	3:47
2.	"Koole"	Yuvin, Uday Leela	Naveen Sajju	2:51
3.	"Neene Guru"	Ghouse Peer	Puneeth Rajkumar	3:40

== Reception ==
Reviewing Mangalavara Rajaadina for The Times of India, Sunayana Suresh gives two and a half out of five stars and stats Mangalavara Rajaadina is a bittersweet tale that begins on a fabulous note. The story might not reach its full potential, but it still might make a good one-time watch. In his review for thehansindia.com, Nischith N gives two and a half out of five star and states as "Mangalavara Rajaadina’ is nothing out-of-box and still a one-time watch..". For the New Indian Express, A.Sharadhaa gave three stars from five with praise for the screenplay, Sharadhaa commented: " ... Mangalavara Rajaadina paints a vivid picture of a middle-class family and a commoner's dreams, while also catering to all sections of the audience. ...".
