= Bazaar (2019 film) =

2019 Indian Kannada action crime film directed by Suni

- Directed by: Suni
- Screenplay by: Suni
- Story by: M. L. Prasanna
- Produced by: Thimmegowda
- Starring: Dhanveer Gowda; Aditi Prabhudeva; Sharath Lohitashwa; Sadhu Kokila
- Cinematography: Santhosh Rai Pathaje
- Edited by: Abhishek. M
- Music by: Ravi Basrur
- Production company: Bharathi Film Productions
- Release date: 1 February 2019
- Country: India
- Language: Kannada

Bazaar (transl. Market) is an Indian Kannada action crime film directed by Suni and produced by Thimmegowda under Bharathi Film Productions banner. The film stars Dhanveer Gowda, a debutant and Aditi Prabhudeva in the lead roles along with Sadhu Kokila, Sharath Lohitashwa and Aruna Balaraj in the supporting roles. The film's plot deals with the gambling process involved in the pigeon racing. The film is shot in the real locations across Bengaluru, Mysore and Tumkur where the pigeon races are actually held.

The technical crew members for the film include Ravi Basrur as the music composer, Santhosh Rai Pathaje as the cinematographer, Abhishek. M as the editor. Initially planned to release on the Sankranthi festival day, the makers postponed the release to 1 February 2019.

== Plot ==
Kalki is an orphan who is raised by a gangster named Yajamana after he saved him from an attack. Kalki aspires to become a pigeon racer and finally becomes a top pigeon racer after defeating Yajamana's rival Shikhar. Kalki falls in love with Pari, a middle-class fashion designer and a mind-over-heart girl. Kalki celebrates every time Pari rejects his proposal, but soon ends up falling in love with her and doesn’t express it. Pari soon proposed to Kalki who finally accepts her proposal. Tragedy strikes Kalki's life as Yajamana gets brutally murdered and Kalki makes Pari to hate him in order to save her. Pari soon accepts to marry the boy of her father's choice. Shikhar finds that the gang called as Dope were responsible for Yajamana's death and joins hands with them to finish Kalki. Kalki confronts Shikhar at the temple festival and learns about the Dope gang, who later finish Shikhar and sets out to finish Kalki. However, a brutally injured Kalki finishes the Dope gang, thus avenging Yajamana's death. Pari learns that Kalki had helped the bride to impress her family, where she leaves the wedding and finally reunites with Kalki.

== Cast ==
- Dhanveer Gowda as Kalki
- Aditi Prabhudeva as Parijatha aka Pari
- Amir Ali Shaik as Waiter
- Sharath Lohitashwa as Yajamana
- Sadhu Kokila as Jumanji
- Sheelam M Swamy as Police officer
- Chethan Chandra
- Silli lalli Anand
- Chitkala Biradar
- Aruna Balaraj as Kalki's adopted mother
- Manjunath Hegde ae Kalki's adopted father
- Sheelam M Swamy as Police
- Hampa Kumar Angadi as Hampa, a Pegion Racer
- Arjun A R as Dope
- Kiran as Dope
- Vishal Anvekar as Dope
- Pradeep as Dope
- Vatara Mallesh
- Vishwavijeth gowda as Dopu
- Raj Deepak Shetty as Shikhar

== Soundtrack ==
Bazaar

Soundtrack album by Ravi Basrur
- Released: 15 August 2018
- Recorded: 2018
- Genre: Feature film soundtrack
- Label: Anand Audio
- Producer: Ravi Basrur

Ravi Basrur has scored the soundtrack and score for the film. A total of three songs were composed by him. The audio was launched under the Ananda audio label by actor Darshan in Bengaluru.

Track listing
No.	Title	Lyrics	Singer(s)	Length
1.	"Love Failure"	Vishnu. S	Vijay Prakash, Santhosh Venky	5:26
2.	"Yeko Yeno"	Sachin Shetty Kumble	Sanjith Hegde, Anuradha Bhat	3:52
3.	"Ondooralli Obba Yajamana"	Kinnal Raj	Kailash Kher	2:53
4.	"Masana Seroythu"	Pramod Jaya	Ravi Basrur	3:01
5.	"Masana Seroythu"	Pramod Jaya	Mehaboob Saab	3:01

== Critical reception ==
Vinay Lokesh of The Times of India gave three out of five stars, praising score he stated, "Watch this movie to know about the world of pigeon racing which is laced with a love story, mass dialogues and action sequences".
