= Patharagitthi =

- Release poster
- Directed by: K Eshwar
- Starring: Srikanth; Prajwal Poovaiah; Tabla Nani
- Cinematography: Rakesh C Thilak
- Edited by: Ganesh M
- Music by: Venkat Swamy; Sameer Kulkarni
- Release date: 29 May 2015
- Country: India
- Language: Kannada

Patharagitthi is a 2015 Indian Kannada language film directed by K Eshwar. It stars Srikanth and Prajwal Poovaiah. The music was composed by Venkat Swamy and Sameer Kulkarni. It was theatrically released on 29 May 2015.

== Cast ==
- Srikanth as Akash
- Prajwal Poovaiah as Bhoomi
- Tabla Nani
- Lucky Shankar
- Raju Talikote
- Layendra
- Mithra
- Bullet Prakash
- Patre Nagaraj
- Sadashiva Brahmavar
- Shanthamma
- Chikkanna
- Shakeela in a guest appearance

== Production ==
Principal photography commenced in July 2013.

== Reception ==
Archana Nathan from The Hindu wrote "A discussion about the filmmaking style and camera work seems inconsequential in a film that is embroiled in so many problems". A Sharadhaa from The New Indian Express says "This is one colourless butterfly that doesn’t seem to fly. It is better to be patient and wait for a real one to flutter by than watch this film". A reviewer from Deccan Herald wrote "As Ishwar & Co tease and test your patience with tripe, your heart is aflutter to scoot to the nearest exit for breath of fresh air to be free from the suffocating tripe. Sad!". A reviewer of Prajavani says "The message in the movie is that one should not consider the society that frames women only. But can it be delivered through long conversations alone?".
