= Mata (2006 film) =

- Directed by: Guruprasad
- Written by: Guruprasad
- Produced by: R Srinivas
- Starring: Jaggesh; R. N. Sudarshan; Tabla Nani; Vaijanath Biradar; Mandya Ramesh
- Cinematography: Santhosh Rai Pathaje
- Edited by: B. S. Kemparaj
- Music by: V. Manohar; Udayaravi
- Production company: Company Films
- Release date: 10 February 2006
- Running time: 143 minutes
- Country: India
- Language: Kannada

Mata (pronounced Maṭha; transl. Monastery) is a 2006 Indian Kannada-language black comedy film written and directed by debutant director Guruprasad. It has an ensemble cast starring Jaggesh, Vaijanath Biradar, and Mandya Ramesh. The director himself had a cameo in the movie.

Maṭha is a black comedy film, primarily revolving around the events that occur within a contemporary matha/mutts, which are revered as sacred institutions in India. The movie depicts that enlightenment is only possible if emotions like anger, lust, desire, etc. are overcome.

With this movie, Guruprasad rose to fame in the industry. Maṭha is the 100th movie for Jaggesh and the 200th movie for Biradar. After the success of this film, the Guruprasad-Jaggesh combo's next movie Eddelu Manjunatha, also directed by Guruprasad, was released in early 2009.

== Plot ==
The movie starts with a taxi driver Venkatesha (Jaggesh) welcoming Sister Martha (played by Pari) to Bangalore. He needs to drive her to a matha(monastery) in Thirthahalli and he starts narrating a story to make the journey interesting, interspersed with sub-stories.

The fore-said matha has an asylum taking care of handicapped orphans and a rare temple of Lord Brahma. He narrates the story about this matha, whose chief is a skirt-chaser and goes to the extent of playing the flute to girls over the phone just to impress them. Soon enough, the chief decides to part with the post in order to join his wife.

In unique circumstances, the manager and administrator of the matha, Appayya (R. N. Sudarshan) advertises in newspapers declaring a vacancy for the post, "Chief of Matha". At this point, breaking the fourth wall, R. N. Sudarshan enacting the role of Appayya declines to read out the dialogues about placing a newspaper ad about vacant Chief of Matha position. Director Guruprasad makes a cameo entry bombarding Appayya to enact his role properly.

The introduction scene of the film involves all the characters are invited with Vedic hymns, "Asathoma Sadgamaya", which translates to "Lead me to the Truth".

The characters are neglected by society, their quest for a societal status and food drives them to do all kinds of things to just remain in the training period as they want to avoid destitution. Given that it is a multi-layered plot, the narrator (Jaggesh) infuses tit-bits of stories to the viewer and seamlessly weaves them with the main plot. For example, the comedy scenes involving Nagaraj Murthy as a desperate king, who wants to build a mausoleum for his wife, are hilarious and signifies the hold on making the audience waiting for the intuitiveness of the next scene. Sudarshan has given a modification of a cool head who always emphasize Dharma, manager's role orchestrated by Sadananda, who is at his comical best.

The story progresses through the many travails of all the six apprentices, who fight for their place under the sun. This process takes them on a journey which transforms their previous meaningless lives into a completely different dimension. The plot also explores the many illegal activities that run behind the scenes in a mutt.

In the end, Jaggesh and the others realize the true meaning of life, and they each adopt a profession best suited to their personality. Sister Martha is revealed to be a guardian angel for the financially ailing mutt when she donates a substantial amount of money for its betterment. The movie ends with Jaggesh thanking sister Martha, and Guruprasad and Sudarshan sharing a small but lively conversation about the outcome of the story.

== Cast ==
- Jaggesh as Upkathe Govindu a.k.a. Venkatesh, a former apprentice in matha who works as a taxi driver
- R. N. Sudarshan as Appayya, the interim chief of the matha who is training the disciples
- Nagathihalli Chandrashekar as the matha head who has left it for a woman
- Vaijanath Biradar as Siddha, an apprentice who is surprisingly calm around corpses as he was born in a cemetery
- Shashidhar Bhat as an apprentice, in the movie he represents lust
- Sudheendra as Chintamani
- Tabla Nani as Venugopal, an apprentice who is an alcoholic
- Asif Farroqi as Pasha, an apprentice, in the movie he represents anger
- Mandya Ramesh as Nagesh, an apprentice
- Guruprasad as Appayya's son
- Sadananda as the manager of the matha who is sceptical of the trainees
- Pranavmurthy as a beggar who later undergoes a transformation facilitated by the astrologist
- Manasi as a harbinger of bad luck
- Bhagirathi Bai Kadam as the blind astrologist who also practical in her thinking
- Vaishnavi Mahant
- Pari as Sister Martha
- V. Manohar (Cameo)
- Raju Ananthaswamy as prisoner (cameo)
- Tara Anuradha (Cameo)
- Doddanna (Cameo)
- Sadhu Kokila (Cameo)
- Vanitha Vasu (Cameo)

== Production ==
The film began production on 14 January 2004 and was in production for two years. The film was shot in a matha near Thirthahalli during the monsoon season. G. V. Iyer and Vadiraj were supposed to be a part of the film but due to their untimely demise, the former was replaced by R. N. Sudarshan. Former police officer Girish Mattannavar was paid ₹1.25 lakh for his two day role. Due to Vadiraj's untimely demise, he couldn't act in the film.

== Soundtrack ==
The film has six songs composed by V. Manohar and Udayaravi, with lyrics by K. R. Sitaram Shastri, V. Manohar, Chaturmukha and Kaviraj. They were sung by C. Ashwath, Gurukiran, B. Jayashree, Hemanth, Chetan and Chaitra H. G.

No.	Title	Lyrics	Length
1.	"Tappu Maadadauru"	V. Manohar	4:21
2.	"Kajol Kappgilve"		3:45
3.	"Gajavadana"		2:00
4.	"Tandetayi"		2:04
5.	"Wanted"		3:35
6.	"Jayate Jayate"		5:18

== Critical reception ==
A critic from Chitraloka.com wrote, "The beauty of this film Mata is the fantastic selection of artistes. All of them have given the perfect timing required for this hilarious film with undercurrents". Deccan Herald wrote "The movie is hilarious, yet puts across its message effortlessly. The film could have been shortened a bit though".

In 2022, a critic from News18 wrote that the movie was like a true vision of unrighteousness happening in a monastery and praised Jaggesh's performance.

== Controversy ==
This movie took on a controversial color when Jaggesh was presented with the Karnataka State Film Award for Best Supporting Actor. Jaggesh publicly expressed his disappointment that he was chosen for the award for best supporting actor despite playing the lead role and decided to reject the state award.
