= Miley Somehow =

- Directed by: Vikram Yoganand
- Screenplay by: Mehdi Ali Khan; Vikram Yoganand
- Produced by: Mehdi Ali Khan; Vikram Yoganand
- Starring: Mehdi Ali Khan; Shakthi Kumar; Adam Aziz; Fatima Raj; Amisha Ambekar; Amrita Saha; Anandan Sundararajan; Arif
- Cinematography: Vikram Yoganand
- Edited by: Vikram Yoganand
- Music by: Nobin Paul
- Production company: Smart Screen Productions
- Distributed by: UTV Motion Pictures
- Release date: 2013
- Running time: 120 minutes
- Country: India
- Language: Hindi
- Budget: $110,000

Miley Somehow is a 2013 independent Hindi romantic comedy film directed and co-written by Vikram Yoganand and shot in and around Bangalore by a crew of young Bangalorean filmmakers.

== Plot ==
The story-line revolves around 6 youngsters in their early and mid 20s and address love, career, relationships, and marriage etc. The theme is very metro and treatment very Urban.

== Cast ==
- Mehdi Ali Khan
- Shakthi Kumar
- Adam Aziz
- Fatima Raj
- Amisha Ambekar
- Amrita Saha
- Anandan Sundararajan
- Arif

== Production ==
The movie is directed by first timer Vikram Yoganand, who was also cinematographer, screenwriter and film editor. Produced by Smart Screen Productions. The film was shot on RED MX camera and was set for release in May 2013.

The production used six main actors plus about 25 to 30 people, with everyone is working because of their passion towards films and filmmaking. The whole crew viz., actors, technicians, musicians, etc., has the passion, zeal and love for films that has driven the team.

Toward the music of the film, "The song, Gumshuda for which music has been rendered by Nobin Paul and sung by Sinchan Dixit, has garnered rave reviews on the social media. We will soon come out with Kehdo, which is also composed by Nobin Paul with lyrics written by Prashanth Lalan and voice rendered by Abhilash Gupta and Sinchan Dixit. The song is a sure shot winner; some nice rhythm elements, fab groove, catchy hook line and it will make you want to shake a leg. A great boost for the entire campaign."

Director Yoganand added, "The whole process of making the film was very gratifying and exciting. It’s something I would do for the rest of my life. We want to be successful in doing meaningful films and put our heart and soul into filmmaking."

== Release ==
The crew is now planning to release the film in a few theatres. "We also plan to release it online later and take part in few film festivals too," said director Yoganand, who added, "The whole process of making the film was very gratifying and exciting. It’s something I would do for the rest of my life. We want to be successful in doing meaningful films and put our heart and soul into Filmmaking."

== Soundtrack ==
The song, Gumshuda for which music has been composed by Nobin Paul and sung by Sinchan Dixit, has garnered rave reviews on the social media. The song Kehdo, is also composed by Nobin Paul with lyrics written by Prashanth Lalan and voices rendered by Abhilash Gupta and Sinchan Dixit. The song is a considered sure shot winner, with some nice rhythm elements, a fab groove, a catchy hook line and it predicted to make viewers want to shake a leg. A great boost for the entire campaign.

No.	Title	Lyrics	Artist(s)	Length
1.	"Kehdo"	Prashanth Lalan	Abhilash Gupta, Sinchan Dixit	2:53
2.	"Gumshuda"	Prashanth Lalan	Sinchan Dixit, Prashanth Lalan	3:01
Total length:				6:00
