= Guruprasad =

Indian actor and director (1972–2024)

- Born: Guruprasada Ramachandra Sharma; 2 November 1972; Kanakapura, Bangalore, Karnataka, India
- Died: October 2024 (aged 52) (Note: Nearly all news outlets had reported his age of death as 52. But the police had estimated that his death would be between 31st October and 1st November in view of his body condition when he was found dead on 3rd November, which conveyed that he passed away just shy of his 52nd birthday.); Madanaiyakanahalli, Bangalore, Karnataka, India
- Occupations: Film director, writer, producer, actor, author, anchor
- Years active: 2006–2024
- Spouse: 2
- Children: 2

Guruprasad (2 November 1972 – 31 October or 1 November 2024) was an Indian film director and actor in the Kannada film industry. His directorial debut was the 2006 film Mata which became a cult hit and his second film as a director was Eddelu Manjunatha. Both films received positive reviews and were considered for many award categories. He was known for portraying satire in a realistic way on screen.

Guruprasad was found dead by a suspected suicide by hanging at his home in Madanayakanahalli, Bangalore, on 3 November 2024. Authorities said that he probably died between 31 October and 1 November, as his body was partially decomposed.

== Filmography ==
=== As a director ===
Key
†	Denotes films that have not yet been released

Year	Title	Notes	Ref
2006	Mata	Debut Feature	
2009	Eddelu Manjunatha	• Karnataka State Film Award for Best Screenplay	
2013	Director's Special		
2017	Eradane Sala		
2024	Ranganayaka		
2025	Eddelu Manjunatha 2		
TBA	† Ademaa	Filming	

=== As an actor ===
Year	Title	Role
2006	Mata	Dhritarashtra
2009	Eddelu Manjunatha	Police Officer
2010	Mylari	
2011	Kal Manja	Director
2011	Hudugaru	Lawyer
2013	Director's Special	Director
2013	Whistle	
2014	Karodpathi	Kotilinga
2016	Jigarthanda	Show Judge
2018	Ananthu Vs Nusrath	G.P.
2020	Kushka	Gangster
2021	Badava Rascal	Poojari
2022	Body God	Puttanna
2022	Mata	
2024	UI	
2025	Eddelu Manjunatha 2	

=== As dialogue writer ===
Year	Title	Notes
2011	Hudugaru	
2013	Whistle	
2014	Super Ranga	

=== Television ===
Year	Title	Role	Channel	Notes
2014	Life Super Guru	Judge/Host	ETV Kannada	
2014	Thaka Dhimi Tha Dancing Star	Judge	ETV Kannada	
2014	Bigg Boss Kannada 2	Wildcard Contestant	Star Suvarna	
2015	Putani Pantru Season 2	Judge	Star Suvarna	
2016	Dance Karnataka Dance	Judge	Zee Kannada	
2017–2018	Barjari Comedy	Judge	Star Suvarna	

== Awards ==
- 2010 – Best Director for Eddelu Manjunatha at the Filmfare Awards
