= Eddelu Manjunatha =

- Film poster
- Directed by: Guruprasad
- Written by: Guruprasad
- Produced by: V. Sanath Kumar
- Starring: Jaggesh; Yagna Shetty; Tabla Nani
- Cinematography: Ashok V. Raman
- Edited by: Narahalli Jnanesh
- Music by: Anoop Seelin
- Production company: Sanath Kumar Productions
- Release date: 17 July 2009
- Running time: 120 minutes
- Country: India
- Language: Kannada

Eddelu Manjunatha (transl. Wake up, Manjunatha!) is a 2009 Indian Kannada language black comedy film directed by Guruprasad and produced by V. Sanath Kumar. It stars Jaggesh and Yagna Shetty in the lead roles, while Tabla Nani and V. Manohar appear in supporting roles.

Eddelu Manjunatha was released on 17 July 2009 to positive reviews from critics and achieved cult status in Kannada cinema. At the 2009–10 Karnataka State Film Awards, Guruprasad won the award for Best Screenplay. At the 57th Filmfare Awards South, the film won two awards – Best Director (Guruprasad) and Special Jury Award (Yagna Shetty).

== Plot ==
This film is about the life and times of a lazy and jobless middle-aged man named Manjunatha ("Manja") who considers his life as an eventual existence rather than a practical, deserving and a capable one. His laziness is portrayed in the film as not a quality but as an ethic imbibed within his general thoughts and notions of the everyday world that surrounds him. Through his formative years, his thinking becomes pragmatic in considering that livelihood can always be sought through alternate sources rather than being a puppet to how the world goes about through linear methods of gaining success and money.

The other essentially important character in the film is a visually impaired person named Naani (played by Tabla Naani). Although being born blind, he wishes to be a film director. Naani does not believe that his physical disability could stop him from achieving what he dreams, that is to be a filmmaker.

The film is structured around the lengthy conversation, which happens in a captive lodge room, between Manja and Naani where each depicts their ideologies and experiences and co-relate their thoughts. Being a Jaggesh film, the film is nowhere short in containing blatant satirical humour and constant metaphors. The characters of Manja and Naani form contrasting personalities - Manja being an unmotivated, lazy and irresponsible guy and Naani being optimistic and ambitious. Even with their contrasting personalities, Manja and Naani get along together pretty well.

The other important character, though minimally portrayed, is the role is of Manja's wife Gowri (played by Yagna Shetty). Manja admittedly marries Gowri because he was getting a small house as a dowry. Gowri struggles to save her relationship while Manja is doused into the casual habits of alcohol, his influential "circle" of friends, betting, occasional petty thieving at random jobs, inability to sustain decent jobs, wife-bitching and other habits including schemes that eventually thicken the gap between living a moral and meaningful life and being an incapable disloyal husband. However, Gowri's character is portrayed to be that of a devout woman who honours the capacity of having a more healthy family life, through her husband changing his ways someday or the other. But days and years go by and Manja's lifestyle remains unchanged much to the chagrin of Gowri.

The conversation now continues shifting from the lodge to Manja's home itself. After celebrating their freedom from the lodge with alcoholism that night they find themselves captive within the house with the help of the local inspector who assists Gowri tackle Manja's unyielding ways. Naani then talks about the plot of his film, which was seemingly ignored by the producer with whom he had placed his trust (and the reason for which he ended up being captive in the lodge). Manja, hearing the simple story of Dr Rajkumar's pledged eyes and how they were now seeing a world through another person, is taken aback and applauds Naani for such a heartwarming plot and how the -Annavru-'s fans would welcome such a movie. He motivates Naani with all success if Naani ever made the film by taking out his mother's prized 50 rupee note from the cupboard and giving it to Naani. He tells Naani that it was considered as a lucky charm to any person that received it. He also happens to find a note in the cupboard that Gowri leaves behind (after her inability to tell him personally that night due to his inebriated state) to Manja conveying that she was now pregnant and that he would soon become a father.

Manja's personality suddenly changes after reading the news. He is unable to express his joy, apart from sharing it with Naani, at that moment being locked in his home. He tries calling Gowri but he doesn't get her on-line. In the midst of all this, a life-changing situation arises for Manja. His wife returns home in writhing pain. Gowri had killed the developing child in her womb due to the burdensome worry that she wasn't in a state to be able to maintain and grow a child while having such a lackluster and incapable husband. She perceived that it was best for the child to not come to life and face a deteriorated lifestyle. Naani leaves the house expressing his ill-timed presence in the development of such an event.

Manja is clipped between a moment where he faced fresh joy like he had not known for a long long time where he believed that the child, who would be his Lakshmi (the Goddess of wealth), would change his life for the better and to another moment that his 'Lakshmi' would not be happening. In his state of hopelessness, he threatens Gowri as to what rights she held to kill his child. Gowri is throbbing in pain to be able to reply to his questions. In this delusion of Manja, Lakshmi -the unborn child, appears to him and speaks to him as to how ill-fated she would have been to have been born as a daughter to such a father. Lakshmi says that Gowri, her mother, did not kill her and that Manja, her father, killed her. She suggests to him that he could celebrate this occasion with his friends by drinking along with them. Manja's remorse knows no bounds. He relays Lakshmi's words to Gowri and says to his wife that neither his own parents nor his own wife or any of his gurus could ever be a guru to him, but the unborn dead child which he will never have in his existence was his ultimate guru to his final immediate realization of the value of life.

== Cast ==
- Jaggesh as Manjunatha "Manja"
- Yagna Shetty as Gowri, Manja's wife
- Tabla Nani as Nani
- V. Manohar
- Guruprasad as Inspector
- A. S. Murthy
- Sadananda
- Veena Bhat
- Sulochana
- Sunitha
- Manjula
- Master Punarva
- Master Ravikiran Shastry
- Master Lokesh

== Soundtrack ==
Background score and soundtrack are composed by Anoop Seelin. All the songs from soundtrack enjoyed frequent airplay in FM radio and T.V. music channels. Only two songs are used in the film.

Eddelu Manjunatha : The Official Motion Picture Soundtrack
No.	Title	Singer(s)	Length
1.	"Aarati Ettire Kall Manjange"	B. K. Sumitra, Anoop Seelin	4:52
2.	"Prapanchave Devaru Maadiro - Female"	M. D. Pallavi	4:16
3.	"Sinchana (Instrumental)"	Anoop Seelin	3:03
4.	"Kshamisu Gandase"	Butto	4:44
5.	"This is our Manjunatha"	Anoop Seelin	2:02
6.	"Baa Chakori Chandra"	Rajesh Krishnan	4:48
7.	"Prapanchave Devaru Maadiro - Male"	Anoop Seelin	4:16
8.	"Aarati Ettire Kall Manjange - Male"	Anoop Seelin	4:49

== Reception ==
=== Critical response ===
R. G. Vijayasarathy of Rediff rated the film 3.5/5 stars and wrote "Guru Prasad hits bull's eye once again with a perfect film in Eddelu Manjunatha. Go and enjoy the laugh riot". The New Indian Express wrote "Guru has narrated the film with a high degree of authenticity and the audience would be able to identify with the characters in the film. Overall, Eddelu Manjunatha is a neat satirical entertainer". B S Srivani of Deccan Herald wrote "Eddelu Manjunatha delivers a hard punch, but will the punch mould characters into shape is another story altogether". A critic from The Times of India rated the film 4/5 stars and wrote, "Jaggesh's performance is marvellous. Yagna Shetty sans make-up is simply superb. Tabla Nani is brilliant. V Manohar and A S Murthy do a commendable job. Camerawork by Ashok Raman is good. Music director Anoop Seelin has created some catchy tunes".

== Awards ==
2009–10 Karnataka State Film Awards

- Best Screenplay – Guruprasad

57th Filmfare Awards South

- Best Director – Guruprasad
- Special Jury Award – Yagna Shetty
