= Madanaiyakanahalli =

Madanayakanahalli
- Municipality
- Country: India
- State: Karnataka
- District: Bangalore Urban
- Talukas: Bangalore North

Population (2001)
  - Total: 5,913

Languages
  - Official: Kannada
- Time zone: UTC+5:30 (IST)
- Postal code: 562162
- Website: http://www.madanayakanahallicity.mrc.gov.in/

Madanayakanahalli is a municipality in the southern state of Karnataka, India. It is located in the Bangalore North taluk of Bangalore Urban district in Karnataka. As of 2001 India census, Madanaiyakanahalli had a population of 5,913, with 3,176 males and 2,737 females.
