= Director's Special (film) =

- Film poster
- Directed by: Guruprasad
- Written by: Guruprasad
- Produced by: Govindu
- Starring: Dhananjaya; Rangayana Raghu
- Cinematography: Mahendra Simha
- Edited by: B S Kemparaju
- Music by: Anoop Seelin
- Production companies: Ajay Pictures; Guruprasad Inc
- Release date: 31 May 2013
- Running time: 125 minutes
- Country: India
- Language: Kannada

Director's Special is a 2013 Indian Kannada-language satire film written and directed by Guruprasad. It stars a debutant Dhananjay along with Rangayana Raghu. The storyline of the movie was also found in two more Kannada movies—Dasavala and Karodpathi. It was also reported that the concept of all these films could be traced back to the 1996 Spanish film Familia in which a lonely rich man hires actors to act as his family members on his birthday.

== Cast ==
- Rangayana Raghu as Panche Shastry/Ramachandra
- Dhananjay as Dhananjaya
- Vatsala Mohan as Seethamma
- Sumitra Devi as Gayathri
- Ram as Hanuma
- M. S. Nagaraj Karanth
- Sathyanarayana Shastry
- S. Keshavamurthy
- Krishnappa in a cameo appearance
- Pooja Gandhi in a special appearance in a song as "Kannalle Yeshtotthu (Champakali)"
- Anoop Seelin in a cameo appearance
- Guruprasad in a cameo appearance

== Production ==
The film was announced by director Guruprasad in 2009. However, the official announcement came in August 2010 when he launched the film with the title Director's Special at Abbaiah Naidu Studios, Bangalore, in the presence of actors Raghavendra Rajkumar and V. Ravichandran.

=== Casting and filming ===
The film's lead role was first offered to Komal Kumar who rejected the offer after hearing the storyline which makes the spoof of the Kannada film industry. After re-working the script, the director approached Dhananjay, a software techie, to play the lead role. Subsequently, he signed actor Rangayana Raghu to play a prominent role.

The filming began in 2011 and was completed the same year, excluding a song sequence which was filmed in 2012. An item number featured actress Pooja Gandhi in a cameo role in the song. Choreographed by Imran Sardhariya, the sequence was filmed at a studio in Bangalore.

== Soundtrack ==
Director's Special

Soundtrack album by Anoop Seelin
- Released: 31 May 2013
- Genre: Feature film soundtrack
- Length: 11:18
- Label: Jhankar Music

Anoop Seelin composed music for the soundtracks, and the lyrics were written by B. R. Lakshman Rao and Sharadasutha. The album consisting of three tracks includes an instrumental number "Mouna Raaga".

Tracklist
No.	Title	Lyrics	Singer(s)	Length
1.	"Devare Agadha"	B. R. Lakshman Rao	Rajesh Krishnan	4:17
2.	"Kannalle Yeshtotthu (Champakali)"	Sharadasutha	Sunitha	3:53
3.	"Mouna Raaga"		Instrumental	3:08
Total length:				11:18

== Release and reception ==
After several delays in the production and post-production, the director announced the release to be in April 2013. But owing to the other big production releases and theater availability issues, the film was pushed for a May release. The film made its theatrical release on 31 May 2013 in 50 theatres across Karnataka.

=== Critical reception ===
The film opened to positive reviews from critics upon theatrical release. The performances of Rangayana Raghu and Dhananjay received unanimous praise. G. S. Kumar of The Times of India reviewed the film and gave it a 3.5/5 rating, and wrote, "With a good script and narration, director Guruprasad has done a good job by weaving the story that has comedy, sentiment, attachment and detachment in life." He concluded writing praises of the acting performances of Rangayana Raghu, Dhananjay and the supporting cast, and the music, camera and editing departments. Prakash Upadhyaya of Oneindia gave the film a rating of three and a half stars out of five and praised the role of the technical and the acting departments in the film, giving special praise to Rangayana Raghu's performance. Sify.com gave the film a "good" rating and credits Guruprasad's style of filmmaking with a "futuristic topic as the theme" and adds that the film "[goes] ... beyond the traditional realm to explore human mind". He concluded, "Performance wise, it is Rangayana Raghu, who excels on the screen. The newcomer Dhananjay shows promise." The Hindu writes "A dialogue with greed" on the theme of the film. Of the acting performances, the reviewer writes, "Though it is Rangayana Raghu who steals the show with his restrained performance, the newcomer Dhanajaya proves his mettle. And writing about Pooja Gandhi's item number 'Kannalli Yest Hottu Nektiya', song provides a 'commercial' relief to the audience".

== See also ==
- Afzal Guru, featured on the poster
