= Heegondhu Dina =

- Directed by: Vikram Yoganand
- Screenplay by: V Vikas
- Produced by: Chandrashekar; Smart Screen Productions
- Starring: Sindhu Loknath; Praveen Tej; Guru Prasad; Padmaja Rao; Mithra; Shobraj; Giri; Girija Lokesh; Balaji Manohar
- Cinematography: Vikram Yoganand
- Edited by: Vikram Yoganand
- Music by: Abhilash Gupta
- Production company: Smart Screen Productions
- Release date: 30 March 2018
- Running time: 120 Mins
- Country: India
- Language: Kannada

Heegondhu Dina (transl. A Day Like This) is a 2018 Indian Kannada-language film starring Sindhu Loknath. The director, editor and cinematographer is Vikram Yoganand. The film is produced by Chandrashekar under Smart Screen Productions banner. The songs and background music are scored by Abhilash Gupta.

== Plot ==
It is an uncut, experimental film shot between 6 am to 8.30 am, as the story unfolds during that time frame. It is just the girl in the movie, and she is in every frame while others come and go. The run time of the film and of its are both two hours.

== Cast ==
- Sindhu Loknath
- Praveen Tej
- Padmaja Rao
- Guruprasad
- Mithra
- Shobaraj
- Girish Shivanna
- Girija Lokesh
- Balaji Manohar

== Music ==
The songs are scored by Abhilash Gupta.

No.	Title	Lyrics	Artist(s)	Length
1.	"Sanchalana"	Ramakrishna Rannagatti	Abhilash Gupta, Sparsha Rk	3:37
2.	"Baduke Achchari"	Ramakrishna Rannagatti	Abhilash Gupta	3:58
3.	"Heegondhu Dina Tite Track"	Ramakrishna Rannagatti	Sinchan Dixit	4:20
4.	"Nade Nade"	Ramakrishna Rannagatti	Supriya Lohith	3:12
Total length:				15:07

The film was slated for release on 9 March 2018, to coincide with International Women's Day, but was later released on 30 March 2018.
