= Khushka Rice =

Rice dish of primarily South Asian origin

Khushka, kuska, or Khusqa is a rice dish of primarily South Asian origin made with spices, rice (usually basmati) and ghee. It's a lunch dish, primarily served with Kurma or Korma and is very popular in Southern India.

== Ingredients ==
The spices and condiments used in Khushka may include but are not limited to: cardamom, cinnamon, bay leaves, coriander and mint leaves, apart from ghee, ginger, onions. The dish retains the white color of rice even with light seasoning with spices. The dish is served with korma, curry, dahi chutney or Raita.

== See also ==
- Biryani
- Hyderabadi Biryani
- Buhari Biryani (Madras)
- Pullao
- Fried Rice
