= Krishna (Kannada actor) =

Indian actor and director (born 1985)

- Born: Sunil Kumar N. 12 June 1985 (age 41); Mysuru, Karnataka, India
- Other name: Darling Krishna
- Occupations: Actor; director; producer; writer
- Years active: 2009–present
- Spouse: Milana Nagaraj (m. 2021)
- Children: 1

Nagappa Sunil Kumar (born 12 June 1985), known professionally as Darling Krishna, is an Indian actor who primarily works in Kannada films. Krishna is a recipient of several accolades including two Karnataka State Film Awards, a Filmfare Awards South and a SIIMA Award.

Krishna made his film debut with Jackie (2010) in a minor role, For his performance in the 2013 film Madarangi, he received the SIIMA Award for Best Male Debut – Kannada nomination. Post his debut, Krishna starred in the Kannada soap-opera Krishna Rukmini. Krishna's career marked a turning point with his directorial debut Love Mocktail (2020) and its sequel Love Mocktail 2 (2022). He won the Filmfare Critics Award for Best Actor – Kannada and SIIMA Award for Best Film – Kannada, for the former. Further success came with Lucky Man (2022) and Kousalya Supraja Rama (2023).

Apart from acting, Krishna established the production house Krishna Talkies. He is married to the actress Milana Nagaraj with whom he has a daughter.

== Early life ==
Darling Krishna was born as Sunil Kumar N. on 12 June 1985 in Mysore, Karnataka. His father Nagappa, is a retired police officer. He completed his MBA from Bangalore.

== Career ==
=== Debut and early work (2010–2019) ===
Darling Krishna started his career as an assistant director for Duniya Soori in Jackie in 2010. He also played a CID officer in the film. He then did a special role in Hudugaru in 2011. Darling Krishna then portrayed the titular role in the Kannada soap-opera "Krishna Rukmini".

Darling Krishna's first lead role came in 2013, with Madarangi opposite Sushma Raj. It was a box office success. B.S. Srivani of Deccan Herald noted, "Krishna manages to hold his own but a smug smile or a fixed grimace won’t carry the day for long."

He had two releases in 2015. He first appeared in Rudra Tandava. The New Indian Express stated, "Krishna is placed well in his role." He next portrayed the titular role opposite Vaishali Deepak in Charlie. Krishna had two releases in 2016 too. He first appeared in Doddmane Hudga, a commercial success. Times of India's Sunayana Suresh mentioned, "Darling Krishna has a role that is pivotal to the film's plot and delivers." He next portrayed John in John Jani Janardhan.

In 2017, he portrayed a bar accountant opposite Teju in Mumbai. Times of India said, "Darling Krishna has all the qualities of a good commercial hero, but the film fails him despite him putting his all." He next portrayed a MLA aspirant in Jaali Baaru Mattu Poli Hudugaru opposite Mansi Vasudeva, which had a delayed release later that year. In 2018, he portrayed Raam opposite Shravya Rao in Huccha 2. Times of India mentioned, "Darling Krishna is earnest as Raam and has done a good job."

=== Directorial debut, success and acclaim (2020–2022) ===
Krishna ventured into direction and production in 2020 with Love Mocktail, which proved as a major turning point in his career. He portrayed a software engineer opposite Milana Nagaraj, who co-produced the film. Aravind Shwetha of The News Minute noted, "Darling Krishna has managed both acting and direction with responsibility. His performance is up to the mark, especially as a doting husband." The New Indian Express stated, "Krishna's role as Adi, who comes in different shades, is done with perfection." It became a critical and commercial success and the fourth highest grossing Kannada film of the year.

In 2021, he appeared in a special song in Kotigobba 3. He portrayed a steward in SriKrishna@gmail.com opposite Bhavana. Vivek M V of Deccan Herald stated, "Darling Krishna's easy-style acting is likebale."

Krishna had four releases in 2022. He first reprised his role in Love Mocktail 2 opposite Milana Nagaraj. Deccan Herald stated, "Krishna sticks to the strengths of the much-loved 2020 romantic drama and does his part well." Times of India stated that Krishna is "endearing and entertaining". It became a box office success and the seventh highest grossing Kannada film of the year. He next appeared opposite Meenakshi Dixit in the much delayed film Local Train. Krishna appeared opposite Sangeetha Sringeri and Roshni Prakash in Lucky Man. Cinema Express mentioned, "Krishna delivers a complete performance. He fits perfectly into all phases of the character." In his last film of the year, he portrayed an IT engineer opposite Nishvika Naidu and Megha Shetty. News18 wrote, "Darling Krishna’s performance will keep you glued to your seats."

=== Career progression (2023–present) ===
In 2023, Krishna first appeared opposite Nimika Ratnakar in Mr. Bachelor. Cinema Express stated, "Krishna brings in all-around entertainment and gets to showcase a bit of his dancing skills." He then portrayed a software engineer opposite Milana Nagaraj in Love Birds. The New Indian Express found his performance to be "natural and poignant". While Times of India wrote, "Krishna and Milana impress with their performance as a couple that is very much in love, but are unable to see through their differences." Krishna later portrayed a chauvinist in Kousalya Supraja Rama opposite Milana Nagaraj and Brinda Acharya. The film became a critical and commercial success. A. Sharadhaa of The New Indian Express noted, "Krishna’s portrayal of his character in two shades mirrors the reality of many households in society and his performance adds depth to the movie." In his last release of the year, Krishna played a wedding planner in love in, Sugar Factory opposite Sonal Monteiro. Y Maheswara Reddy of Bangalore Mirror stated, "Krishna, excels as a lover boy. He remains convincing as a casual as well as a true lover."

With no release in 2024, Krishna played a gambler and a man consumed by greed in the 2025 film Brat, opposite Manisha Kandkur. Vivek M.V. stated, "Krishna plays an emotionally stoic character. The actor has moved out of his lover-boy image, and has more or less delivered in his attempt". Krishna reprised Aadi opposite Milana, in the 2026 film Love Mocktail 3, his third directorial release. Sanjay Ponnappa was appreciative of his direction and noted, "Krishna is a bonafide darling, carrying that charm effortlessly through his character, adding a layer of innocence with his performance." A commercial success, it became the fourth highest-grossing Kannada film of the year and the highest-grossing film of the franchise.

Krishna will next appear in Love Me Or Hate Me opposite Rachita Ram.

== Personal life ==
Sunil Kumar changed his name to Krishna, after the success of his first Kannada serial, Krishna Rukmini (2011).

Krishna met actress Milana Nagaraj on the sets of the film Nam Duniya Nam Style. They eventually started dating in 2015. Krishna married Milana on 14 February 2021, in a private traditional ceremony on the outskirts of Bengaluru. On 5 September 2024, Milana gave birth to their daughter Pari.

== Other work and media image ==
Krishna is one of the most promising actor in the Kannada cinema. His first film as the lead, Madarangi, earned him the title "Darling Krishna". In 2020, Krishna was placed 12th in Bangalore Times' 30 Most Desirable Men list.

Darling Krishna started his own production house "Krishna Talkies" in 2020. He has co-produced Love Mocktail (2020) and Love Mocktail 2 (2022) under the same. He won SIIMA Award for Best Film – Kannada for the former. He next produced Kousalya Supraja Rama (2023), a commercial success.

== Filmography ==
=== Films ===
Key
†	Denotes films that have not yet been released

Year	Title	Role	Notes	Ref.
2010	Jackie	CID Officer	Uncredited	
2011	Dandam Dashagunam	Police officer	credited as Sunil	
2011	Hudugaru	Prabhu's friend	Uncredited	
2013	Madarangi	Manu		
2013	Nam Duniya Nam Style	Yogi		
2015	Rudra Tandava	Kumar		
2015	Charlie	Cheluvanarayana Swamy		
2016	Doddmane Hudga	Krishna		
2016	John Jani Janardhan	John		
2017	Mumbai	Jakathi		
2017	Jaali Baaru Mattu Poli Hudugaru	Santhosh Kumar		
2018	Huccha 2	Raam		
2020	Love Mocktail	Aditya "Adi"		
2021	Kotigobba 3	Himself	Special appearance in song "Akashane Adarisuva"	
2021	SriKrishna@gmail.com	Sathya		
2022	Love Mocktail 2	Aditya "Adi"		
2022	Local Train	Santhosh		
2022	Lucky Man	Arjun Nagappa		
2022	Dilpasand	Santosh		
2023	Mr. Bachelor	Karthik		
2023	Love Birds	Deepak		
2023	Kousalya Supraja Rama	Ram Siddegowda		
2023	Sugar Factory	Arya		
2025	Brat	Kristy		
2026	Love Mocktail 3	Aditya "Adi"		
2026	Father †	TBA	Completed	
2026	Love Me Or Hate Me †	TBA	Completed	

=== Other crew positions ===
Year	Title	Role	Ref.
2010	Jackie	Assistant director	
2011	Dandam Dashagunam	Assistant director	
2011	Hudugaru	Assistant director	
2020	Love Mocktail	Director, Writer and Producer	
2022	Love Mocktail 2	Director, Writer and Producer	
2023	Kousalya Supraja Rama	Producer	
2026	Love Mocktail 3	Director, Writer and Producer	

=== Television ===
Year	Title	Role	Ref.
2011–2012	Krishna Rukmini	Krishna	

== Accolades ==
Year	Award	Category	Film	Result	Ref.
2014	South Indian International Movie Awards	Best Male Debut – Kannada	Madarangi	Nominated	
2021	Chandanavana Film Critics Academy Awards	Best Film	Love Mocktail	Nominated	
2021	Chandanavana Film Critics Academy Awards	Best Director	Love Mocktail	Nominated	
2021	Chandanavana Film Critics Academy Awards	Best Actor	Love Mocktail	Nominated	
2021	Chandanavana Film Critics Academy Awards	Best Screenplay	Love Mocktail	Nominated	
2021	Chandanavana Film Critics Academy Awards	Best Dialogue Writer	Love Mocktail	Nominated	
2021	South Indian International Movie Awards	Best Film – Kannada	Love Mocktail	Won	
2021	South Indian International Movie Awards	Best Director – Kannada	Love Mocktail	Nominated	
2021	South Indian International Movie Awards	Best Actor – Kannada	Love Mocktail	Nominated	
2022	Filmfare Awards South	Best Director – Kannada	Love Mocktail	Nominated	
2022	Filmfare Awards South	Best Actor – Kannada	Love Mocktail	Nominated	
2022	Filmfare Awards South	Best Actor Critics – Kannada	Love Mocktail	Won	
2022	Chittara Star Awards	Star Award	Love Mocktail	Won	
2023	South Indian International Movie Awards	Best Film – Kannada	Love Mocktail 2	Nominated	
2023	South Indian International Movie Awards	Best Director – Kannada	Love Mocktail 2	Nominated	
2023	Chandanavana Film Critics Academy Awards	Best Screenplay	Love Mocktail 2	Won	
2024	IIFA Utsavam	Best Actor – Kannada	Kousalya Supraja Rama	Nominated	
2024	Chittara Star Awards	Best Actor	Kousalya Supraja Rama	Nominated	
2024	Chittara Star Awards	Best Actor – Critics	Kousalya Supraja Rama	Won	
2025	Karnataka State Film Awards	Second Best Film	Love Mocktail	Won	
2025	Karnataka State Film Awards	Best Screenplay	Love Mocktail	Won	
2025	Chittara Star Awards	Youth Icon – Male	—N/a	Nominated	

== See also ==
- List of Indian film actors
