= PC Shekhar =

P. Chandrashekhar
- Occupation: Director
- Years active: 2006–present
- Spouse: Meghana

P. Chandrashekhar, popular by the screen name PC Shekhar is an Indian film director His directorial was a Tamil movie Kadhale En Kadhale which got released in 2006. He rose to fame in the Kannada film industry with the movie Romeo, which got released in 2012.

== Early life and career ==
While as a student, PC Shekhar had no big dreams of entering tinsel world, a life changing event did occur when he was pursuing his degree. One of his brothers-in-law Rajendran being an actor, it so happened that PC Shekhar visited the Vikram-Suriya starrer Pitamagan shooting spot and got captivated by film-making. Eventually he made a couple of short films Ne Yen Nanban Da and My Imagination (silent movie). Both these short films were critically acclaimed in some of the film festivals. This naturally boosted not only his confidence, but even his family begin to dream big on the director in him. This implied that the brother himself started producing his initial movies.

PC Shekhar made his debut with Kadhale En Kadhale, which won the Tamil Nadu State Film Award for Best Film Portraying Woman in Good Light. Later he made Kannada industry as his home with the debut of the Naayaka. He went on to direct comic dramas like Romeo (2012), Chaddi Dosth (2013) and also thrillers like Arjuna (2015), the comic drama Style King (2016) and the 2017 released Raaga depicted a love story between two blind persons.

== Personal life ==
He has a Bsc degree (Physics, chemistry and Mathematics) from St. Joseph’s college and a MCA degree from Alliance Business Academy. His younger brother P Ramesh Kumar is the producer of three of his movies (Kadhale En Kadhale, Naayaka, Romeo).

He married Meghana in 2017.

== Filmography ==
- All films are in Kannada, unless otherwise noted.

Year	Film	
Year	Film	Notes
2006	Kadhale En Kadhale	Tamil film; Tamil Nadu State Film Award for Best Film Portraying Woman in Good Light
2010	Naayaka	
2012	Romeo	
2013	Chaddi Dosth	
2015	Arjuna	
2016	Style King	
2017	Raaga	
2018	The Terrorist	
2023	Love Birds	
2025	Bad	
