= Naayaka =

2010 Indian Kannada language romantic action film

- Directed by: PC Shekhar
- Written by: PC Shekhar
- Produced by: Ramesh Kumar P Pradeep Kumar G
- Starring: Naveen; Ragini Dwivedi; Rajendran
- Cinematography: Murrali Krish
- Edited by: Suresh Urs
- Music by: Praveen Duth
- Release date: 17 December 2010
- Running time: 130 minutes
- Country: India
- Language: Kannada

Naayaka is a 2010 Indian Kannada romantic action film written and directed by PC Shekhar and starring Naveen, Ragini Dwivedi, and Rajendran. The film was released to negative reviews by critics with the dubbing particularly criticised.

== Plot ==
Naayaka revolves around Arjun and Madhu, who are deep in love with each other. Like most other love stories, they too have to overcome multiple obstacles that try to weaken their relationship. The difference was their strong love and one unfortunate event. This event puts the two of them into the ultimate test of commitment, love, and the promise that binds them together.

== Cast ==
- Naveen as Arjun
- Ragini Dwivedi as Madhu
- Rajendran as Nagappa
- Meesai Rajendranath

== Production ==
This film marks the second collaboration between PC Shekhar and Naveen after Kadhale En Kadhale (2006). The film began production in May 2009 was completed by October 2009. Post-production work almost took a year with dubbing taking 75 days.

== Reception ==
Shruti Indira Lakshminarayana of Rediff.com rated the film 1.5/5 stars and wrote, "Nayaka would have been a good effort if supported by a strong script and characters. This Nayaka (hero) fails to carry the film on his tough shoulders". GS Kumar of The Times of India rated the film 2.5/5 stars and wrote, "Though the script is good and the movie opens with somelively sequences, the narrative is quite amateurish in the second half". A critic from IANS wrote, "'Naayaka' could have been a better film with a neater script and dubbing. Nevertheless, it makes for a one time watch".
