= Style King =

- Directed by: PC Shekhar
- Written by: PC Shekhar
- Produced by: Maruthi Jadiyavar
- Starring: Ganesh; Remya Nambeesan; Rangayana Raghu; Sadhu Kokila
- Cinematography: Santhosh Pandi
- Edited by: Saravanan
- Music by: Arjun Janya
- Production company: Maruthi Enterprises
- Release date: 13 May 2016
- Country: India
- Language: Kannada

Style King is a 2016 Indian Kannada-language action comedy film directed by PC Shekhar and produced by Maruthi Jediyavar. It stars Ganesh in dual role, alongside Remya Nambeesan, Rangayana Raghu, Padmaja Rao and Sai Dheena in supporting roles. The film marks Remya Nambeesan's debut in Kannada cinema and also marks the second collaboration of Ganesh and PC Shekhar after Romeo. The music was composed by Arjun Janya, while cinematography and editing were handled by Santhosh Pandi and Saravanan.

The film was officially announced on 12 August 2014 and it was reported that Ganesh would feature in two different roles. The film was expected to release on 25 December 2015 along with actor Yash's film Masterpiece. After multiple delays, the film was censored in April 2016 and finally released on 13 May 2016.

== Plot ==
Kashi alias 'King' is a small time crook who steals a bag of cocaine from a drug smuggler Dheena. Along with his friend Babu, Kashi hides the bag in a dumping yard. Karthik is an aspiring police trainee and Kashi's lookalike who gets into trouble when his father Naga is in debts and has borrowed money from the councillor, but is unable to return the money. Due to this, the councilor took Naga's friend Sundar's jewellery case and tells him to repay it on time. Sundar learns about this and cancels his younger daughter Ramya's wedding with Karthik. Days pass by, Sundar gradually warms up to Karthik and forgives Naga, where Karthik and Ramya resume their relationship. Karthik learns from his constable friend Giri that he passed the IPS exam, but had to pay a bribe of ₹20 lakhs in order to get his posting in Bangalore.

Meanwhile, Kashi and Babu are arrested by a cop for drug smuggling, but they get released after Kashi manages to blackmail him by uploading a video in which he was in the company of a sex worker. Along with another smuggler Perumal and the cop, Dheena kidnaps Babu and tells Kashi to hand over the bag at a secluded place where he replaces the cocaine bag with Rangoli powder. Kashi finds Babu, who later dies in his arms. Enraged, Kashi kills the cop and flees with the bag. Perumal and Dheena catch Kashi, and they stab him to death, but Kashi throws the bag somewhere and is found by Karthik. Perumal double-crosses Dheena by giving him a fake bike number and meets up with Karthik, where he promises to give him ₹20 Lakhs in exchange for the bag, to which Karthik and Giri agree.

Karthik returns home only to finds his parents had unknowingly consumed cocaine, which they thought was maida and takes them to the hospital where Kashi is also admitted. Kashi learns about Perumal's deal about the bag after listening to the conversation between Karthik and Giri. Believing that Karthik has the bag, Kashi kidnaps Naga. While finding the bag, Karthik gives a lift to Dheena's henchman where Dheena learns about Perumal's betrayal. Perumal tries to kidnap Ramya in order for Karthik to hand over the bag. Kashi arrives in nick of time and savagely kills Perumal and his gang, but Ramya escapes with Giri (who was knocked out by Kashi before, when Karthik went to meet Ramya to clear the misunderstanding). Karthik lands in trouble due to Kashi's murders and an arrest warrant is issued on him. Karthik manages to save Naga, where it is revealed that Karthik's office manager Sadhu had stolen the bag in order to take revenge on Karthik when he humiliated him earlier.

Karthik lies to Dheena that the councilor has the bag, where they meet up in the councilor's godown. Dheena kills the councilor after he refuse to give them the bag, but Karthik's lie gets exposed and Sadhu unknowingly calls Dheena to set up a deal for the bag, where he is mistaken for Karthik's boss and is held captive. Karthik tries to snatch the bag, but Kashi arrives and fights with Dheena's henchman and also kills Dheena, but gets stabbed and left to die before the councilor's godown is set ablaze. Karthik gets back Sundar's daughter's jewellery case back and also becomes ACP in efforts for thwarting the drug syndicate. Karthik and Ramya get married with the blessings of his parents. After their marriage, Karthik gets a call from Kashi, who survived and congratulates him. Karthik challenges Kashi that he will catch him red-handed, to which Kashi wishes him luck.

== Cast ==
- Ganesh as Karthik / 'King' Kashi (dual role)
- Remya Nambeesan as Ramya
- Sai Dheena as Dheena
- Rangayana Raghu as Naga, Karthik's father
- Sadhu Kokila as Sadhu
- Padmaja Rao as Naga's wife and Karthik's mother
- Renny as Vishu
- Mithra
- Sundar Raj as Sundar, Ramya's father
- Sadguna Murthy
- Rajashekar Naidu
- Meesai Rajendranath

== Production ==
PC Shekhar who had worked with Ganesh before in Romeo, initially titled the film as King. However, upon Ganesh's suggestions, he added the word "Style" to the title. The official launch took place at the Symphony theatre in Bangalore on 7 August 2014. Malayalam actress Ramya Nambeesan was roped in to play the female lead. Rangayana Raghu was roped in for the supporting role, while Sai Dheena was chosen as the antagonist.

== Soundtrack ==
The film's score and soundtrack are composed by Arjun Janya. The audio is slated to release in November 2015.

Track listing
No.	Title	Artist(s)	Length
1.	"Ala Le Sukimaari"	Rajesh Krishnan	3:48
2.	"Nanage Nanage"	Karthik	4:56
3.	"Gangu Gangu"	Chethan Naik	4:15
4.	"Stylo Stylo"	Tippu	4:11
5.	"Dhaga Dhaga"	Arjun Janya	3:44
6.	"Style King (Theme Music)"	Arjun Janya	1:40
Total length:			22:24
