= Rachel David =

Indian actress

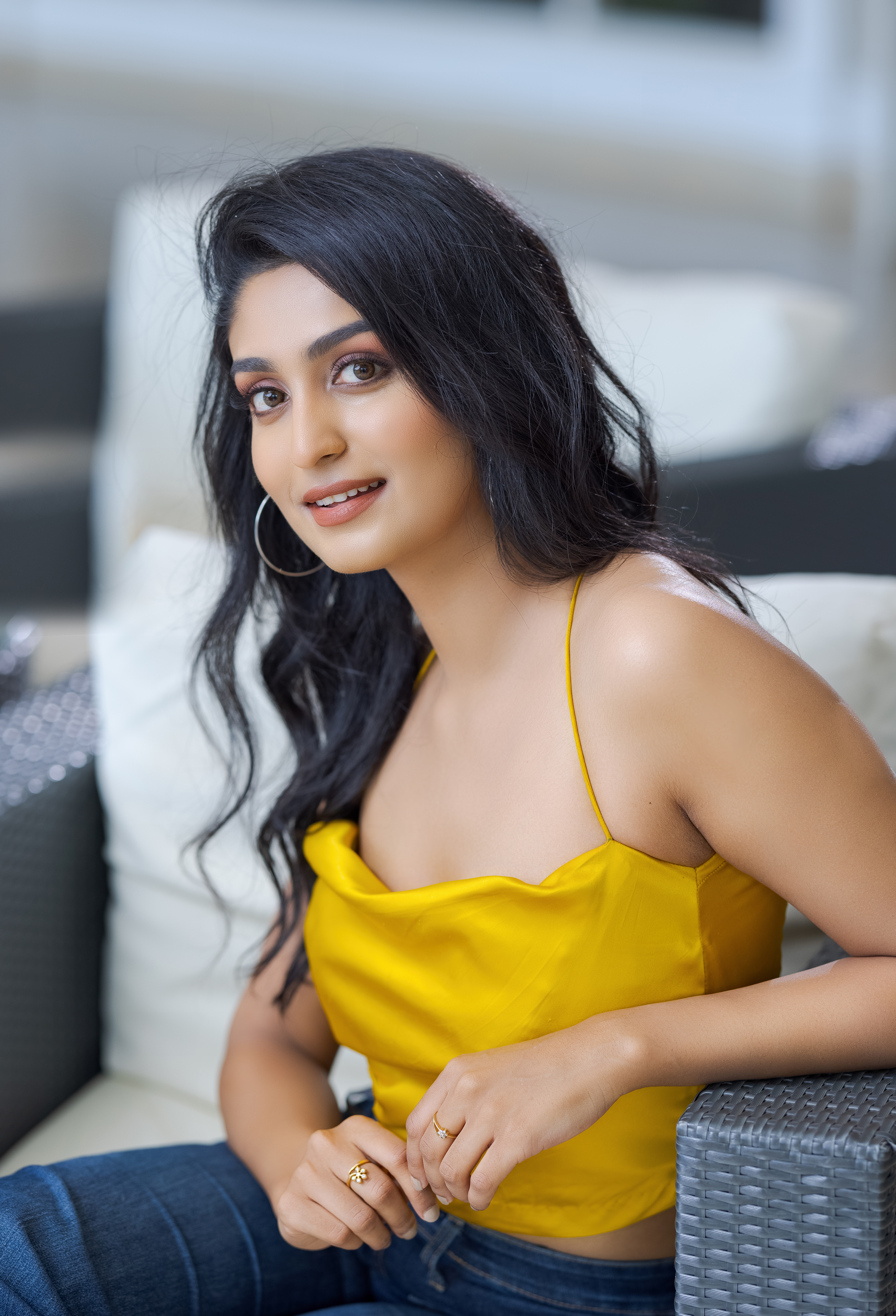
- Born: Bangalore, Karnataka, India
- Education: BBM, St. Joseph's College of Commerce, Bangalore
- Occupation: Actress
- Years active: 2019–present
- Known for: Irupathiyonnaam Noottaandu; Love Mocktail 2

Rachel David is an Indian actress, who works in Malayalam and Kannada cinema. Rachel made her acting debut in the 2019 Malayalam film Irupathiyonnaam Noottaandu alongside Pranav Mohanlal. She is best known for her portrayal in the 2022 Kannada film Love Mocktail 2.

== Early life ==
Rachel was born in Bangalore, Karnataka. She did her schooling at Bishop Cotton Girls' School, Bangalore. She also completed her pre-university at Christ College and went onto pursue her graduation in Bachelors of Business Management (BBM) at St. Joseph's College of Commerce. She is settled in Bengaluru.

== Career ==
She started her career in film Industry in 2019 with the film Irupathiyonnaam Noottaandu as Zaya, the heroine of the film opposite to Pranav Mohanlal. In the same year, she appeared in the film Oronnonnara Pranayakadha in lead role. Rachel David made her Kannada film debut with Krishna's Love Mocktail 2 in 2022. Although she known as Zaya David, her official and stage name is Rachel David.

== Filmography ==
=== Films ===
Key
†	Denotes films that have not yet been released

Year	Title	Role	Language	Notes	Ref.
2019	Irupathiyonnaam Noottaandu	Zaya	Malayalam	Debut film	
2019	Oronnonnara Pranayakadha	Amina	Malayalam		
2021	Kaaval	Rachel Antony	Malayalam		
2022	Love Mocktail 2	Sihi	Kannada		
2024	Chef Chidambara	Anu	Kannada		
2025	Bhuvanam Gaganam	Nandini	Kannada		
2026	Koodothram	Anjana	Malayalam		
2026	Love Mocktail 3	Sihi	Kannada		
TBA	Walking Talking Strawberry Ice Cream †	Tejon Maya	Tamil	Completed	

== Awards and nominations ==
Year	Award	Category	Film	Result	Ref.
2023	Chandanavana Film Critics Academy Awards	Best Debut Actress	Love Mocktail 2	Nominated	
