= Vaishali Deepak =

Indian actress

- Born: 14/06/1995; Bangalore, India
- Occupation: Actress
- Years active: 2014–present

Vaishali Deepak is an Indian actress who has appeared in Kannada, Tamil and Telugu language films. After portraying her first lead role in Charlie (2015), she appeared in the Tamil film Tharkappu (2016).

== Career ==
Prior to joining the Kannada film industry, Vaishali performed as a stage actor and also interned with film production studios in Mumbai, before circulating her portfolio looking for acting opportunities. Vaishali began acting in films during 2013, but production delays meant that several of her films were delayed or experienced changes in cast. After replacing Shravya in Om Prakash Rao's Huchcha 2, a remake of the Tamil film Raam (2005), Vaishali was later replaced by Aishwarya Devan. She also began shooting for another one of Rao's projects, Ayya 2, but was also later ousted from the project. Subsequently, her first release came through Charlie (2015), where Vaishali portrayed an innocent character alongside Krishna and Milana Nagaraj. The film, which took two years to complete production, performed won positive reviews, with a critic noting she "makes her presence felt".

Vaishali has several films due for release in 2016 including the Tamil film Tharkappu, two films with Shivrajkumar in Shivalinga and Santheyalli Nintha Kabira, as well as Thundh Haikla Sahavasa and a Telugu film titled Rock.

== Filmography ==
Key
| † | Denotes films that have not yet been released |

| Year | Film | Role | Language | Notes |
|---|---|---|---|---|
| 2015 | Charlie | Gayathri | Kannada | |
| 2016 | Tharkappu | Meenu | Tamil | |
| 2016 | Shivalinga | Sangeetha | Kannada | |
| 2016 | Santheyalli Nintha Kabira | Lakshmi | Kannada | |
| 2017 | Bharjari | | Kannada | |
| 2017 | Thundh Haikla Sahavasa | | Kannada | Completed |
| 2017 | Rock | | Telugu | Completed |
| 2018 | Trunk | | Kannada | Released |
| 2018 | Divya Mani | | Telugu | Released |
