= Love Birds (2023 film) =

Indian romantic drama film

- Directed by: PC Shekhar
- Written by: Prashanth Rajappa (dialogues)
- Screenplay by: PC Shekhar
- Story by: PC Shekhar
- Produced by: Kadipudi Chandru
- Starring: Darling Krishna; Milana Nagaraj
- Cinematography: D. Shakthi Sekar
- Edited by: PC Shekhar
- Music by: Arjun Janya
- Production company: Sri Banashankri Chitralaya
- Release date: 17 February 2023
- Running time: 189 minutes
- Country: India
- Language: Kannada

Love Birds is a 2023 Indian Kannada-language romantic drama film directed by PC Shekhar and starring Darling Krishna and Milana Nagaraj.

== Cast ==
- Darling Krishna as Deepak
- Milana Nagaraj as Pooja
- Samyukta Hornad as Maya
- Rangayana Raghu
- Sadhu Kokila
- Veena Sundar
- Avinash
- Kadipudi Chandru

== Soundtrack ==
The music was composed by Arjun Janya.

All lyrics are written by Kaviraj.

Track listing
No.	Title	Singer(s)	Length
1.	"Neene Dohretha Mele"	Indu Nagaraj	2:49
2.	"Ninna Pala Pala Kangala"	Aishwarya Rangarajan	3:11
3.	"Oh Olave Olave"	Nishan Rai, Aishwarya Rangarajan	2:40
4.	"Aakasha Dha"	Nishan Rai	3:47
5.	"Maathu Ninthathumele Sotthu"	Nishan Rai	2:22
Total length:			14:49

== Reception ==
A critic from The Times of India wrote that "Love Birds is a warm tale of an urban couple. Director PC Shekar has taken this slice-of-life story and narrated it with a mix of humour and heartburn. There have been several other films based on similar topics, and this one too treads the predictable path". A critic from Cinema Express wrote that "Love Birds gives a mature outlook on modern relationships, discussing love, trust, and marriage. And there are ample takeaways for husband and wife to maintain a harmonious marriage". A critic from Deccan Herald wrote that "The film was perhaps made to cash in on the couple’s brand. The two were meant to reach new heights post the hit Love Mocktail franchise but with a series of poor choices, their career seems to be already in a downward spiral".
