= Tharkappu =

2016 Tamil action thriller film by R. P. Ravi

- Poster
- Directed by: R. P. Ravi
- Written by: R. P. Ravi
- Produced by: Dr. S. Selvamuthu; Manjunath
- Starring: Shakthi Vasudevan; Samuthirakani; Sathish Krishnan; Vatsan Chakravarthy; Vaishali Deepak
- Cinematography: Jones Anand
- Edited by: San Lokesh
- Music by: F. S. Faizal
- Production company: Kinetoscope Production
- Release date: 1 January 2016
- Country: India
- Language: Tamil

Tharkappu (transl. Self Defense) is a 2016 Tamil language action thriller film directed by R.P. Ravi and produced by S. Selvamuthu and Manjunath. The film stars Shakthi Vasudevan and Samuthirakani. The film's original soundtrack has been composed by F. S. Faizal, while the film was released on 1 January 2016.

== Cast ==
- Shakthi Vasudevan as Inspector Sakthivel
- Samuthirakani as Iraianbu
- Sathish Krishnan as Jai
- Vatsan Chakravarthy as Vino
- Vaishali Deepak as Meenu
- Amitha Ranganath as Aditi
- Riyaz Khan as Arjun
- Ganesh Prasath as Ganesh
- Kebi Raj

== Soundtrack ==
The soundtrack was composed by F. S. Faisal. The original soundtrack consists of the following tracks:

Song	Singers	Length (m:ss)
"Aayiram Aayiramayi"	Hariharasudhan, Nincy	04:30
"Ivan Peyar"	Ranjith	04:20
"Sayangala"	Jagadish, Upasana	04:30
"Hey Hey Ithu"	Srinivas, Norway Santhiya	05:00

== Release and reception ==
The trailer of Tharkappu was released in Malaysia on 27 December 2015 and a premiere show was held thereafter in the country. The film was released on 1 January 2016 to mixed reviews. A critic added "Tharkappu begins well only to lose steam as it progresses", "but is worth a watch for the twists and turns".
