= Charlie (2015 Kannada film) =

- Directed by: Shiva
- Screenplay by: Shiva
- Story by: Shiva
- Produced by: Manjunath L. Y. M.
- Starring: Krishna; Vaishali Deepak; Milana Nagaraj; Girish Karnad
- Cinematography: Girish R. Gowda
- Edited by: Deepu S. Kumar
- Music by: Veer Samarth
- Production company: LYM Movie Makers
- Distributed by: MNK Movies
- Release date: 17 September 2015
- Running time: 110 minutes
- Country: India
- Language: Kannada

Charlie (Kannada: ಚಾರ್ಲಿ) is a 2015 Indian Kannada action film written and directed by Shiva, and stars Krishna and Vaishali Deepak. Film score and soundtrack were composed by Veer Samarth, and cinematography by Girish R. Gowda.

== Cast ==
- Krishna as Cheluvanarayana Swamy "Charlie"
- Vaishali Deepak as Gayathri
- Milana Nagaraj as Purvi
- Sharath Lohitashwa
- Raghava Uday
- Gurunandan
- Manju Rangashankar
- Killer Venkatesh
- Bhaskar Surya
- M. S. Umesh
- Honnavalli Krishna
- Sanketh Kashi
- Kamalashree
- Suchithra
- Apoorva

== Soundtrack ==
Charlie

Soundtrack album by Veer Samarth
- Released: 7 January 2015
- Recorded: 2014
- Genre: Feature film soundtrack
- Length: 22:27
- Label: Anand Audio

Veer Samarth composed film score and the soundtrack, lyrics for which were penned by Chethan Kumar, Yogaraj Bhat and Kaviraj. The soundtrack album consists of five tracks.

No.	Title	Lyrics	Singer(s)	Length
1.	"Ayyayo Charlie"	Chethan Kumar	Chandan Shetty, Anuradha Bhat, Meghana Joshi	3:50
2.	"Beladingallallu"	Yogaraj Bhat	Vijay Prakash, Veer Samarth	4:42
3.	"Yaaro Geechidante"	Kaviraj	Chetan Gandharva	5:02
4.	"Yeh Khuda Yeh Khuda"	Chethan Kumar	Chetan Gandharva	5:09
5.	"Touch Touch"	Chethan Kumar	Shashank Sheshagiri	3:44
Total length:				22:27
