= Chef Chidambara =

- Theatrical release poster
- Directed by: M Anand Raj
- Written by: Shree Ganesh Parashuram (dialogues)
- Screenplay by: Shree Ganesh Parashuram
- Story by: M Anand Raj
- Produced by: Roopa DN
- Starring: Aniruddha Jatkar; Rachel David; Nidhi Subbaiah
- Cinematography: Uday Leela
- Edited by: Vijeth Chandra
- Music by: Ritvik Muralidhar
- Production company: Damthi Pictures
- Distributed by: KRG Studios
- Release date: 14 June 2024
- Country: India
- Language: Kannada

Chef Chidambara is a 2024 Indian Kannada-language thriller drama film directed by M. Anand Raj and starring Aniruddha Jatkar in the titular role, Rachel David and Nidhi Subbaiah. The film was released to mixed-to-positive reviews.

== Cast ==
- Aniruddha Jatkar as Chef Chidambara
- Rachel David as Anu
- Nidhi Subbaiah as Mona
- Sharath Lohithaswa as corrupt cop
- Shivamani as don
- KS Sridhar as Avinash

== Production ==
The film is based on a true story from Sri Lanka. Aniruddha Jatkar learned cooking for the film.

== Reception ==
A critic from The Times of India rated the film three out of five stars and wrote that "For the audience that is not so used this genre, one can expect a couple of surprises from Chef Chidambara". A critic from Deccan Herald wrote that "If keeping the audience engaged until the climax without logic is a metric of success, then Raj’s thriller is a success". A critic from Bangalore Mirror wrote that "You can watch this movie if you like the dark comedy genre". A critic from Times Now rated the film two-and-a-half out of five stars and wrote that "Chef Chidambara as a thriller is only as good as a non-vegetarian dish that hardly has any meat to savour". A critic from The South First wrote that "Chef Chidambara makes for an entertaining one-time watch, with enough comedy and some good performances".
