= Bank of Bhagyalakshmi =

Indian Kannada-language crime comedy thriller film

- Theatrical release poster
- Directed by: Abhishek Manjunath
- Written by: Abhishek Manjunath
- Screenplay by: Abhishek Manjunath
- Story by: Abhishek Manjunath
- Produced by: H. K. Prakash
- Starring: Dheekshith Shetty; Brinda Acharya
- Cinematography: Abhishek G. Kasaragod
- Edited by: Tejas R
- Music by: Judah Sandhy
- Production company: Shree Devi Entertainers
- Release date: 28 November 2025
- Running time: 142 minutes
- Country: India
- Language: Kannada

Bank Of Bhagyalakshmi is a 2025 Indian Kannada-language crime comedy thriller directed by debutant Abhishek Manjunath. The film stars Dheekshith Shetty and Brinda Acharya in lead roles, supported by Sadhu Kokila, Gopalkrishna Deshpande, Sruthi Hariharan, Viswanath Mandalika and Ashwin Rao Pallakki. Music is composed by Judah Sandhy, with cinematography by Abhishek G. Kasaragod.

The film was initially announced in the year 2022 and took three years for the production to complete. It revolves around a botched bank heist that spirals into chaos and humor.

== Plot ==
The story unfolds in a rural Karnataka town during election season, a time when political parties are busy managing black money and vote-buying strategies. Kanaka (Dheekshith Shetty), a small-time rowdy with big dreams, leads a gang of five amateur thieves. Tired of petty thefts, they plan a grand heist—to loot the Bhagyalakshmi Cooperative Bank, expecting crores of rupees stashed inside. Before the heist, Inspector Ramakrishna (Sadhu Kokila) warns Kanaka and his gang to stay out of trouble. Kanaka arrogantly retorts, even threatening to get the inspector transferred. Confident in their plan, the gang breaks into the bank during a lull in election chaos. However, their dream shatters when they discover only ₹67,000 in the safe. This botched robbery sets off a chain of comic mishaps and escalating tension.

As they hold the bank staff and customers hostage, Arpita (Brinda Acharya), a bank employee, becomes central to the drama. Kanaka, smitten by her charm, tries to woo her even as the situation worsens. Meanwhile, Inspector Ajith (Viswanath Mandalika) and his team surround the bank, leading to a tense standoff. The gang, desperate to escape, resorts to bizarre tactics—recording videos and posting demands on social media, threatening to kill hostages if their conditions aren't met. The government, fearing election disruption, reluctantly negotiates.

The twist arrives when Kanaka learns of a hidden stash of black money linked to politicians inside the bank premises. This revelation turns the simple robbery into a high-stakes chase for crores, exposing corruption and greed. Amid frantic attempts to locate the secret cache, the gang faces betrayal, moral dilemmas, and mounting pressure from law enforcement. Kanaka's romantic subplot with Arpita adds emotional depth to the otherwise chaotic narrative.

The climax ties together themes of greed, survival, and political corruption, as the gang's fate, the black money mystery, and Kanaka's love story reach an unpredictable conclusion. While the film maintains a humorous undertone, it also sheds light on the dark realities behind cooperative banks and election-time scams

== Cast ==
- Dheekshith Shetty as Kanaka
- Brinda Acharya as Arpita
- Ashwin Rao Pallaki as Yogananda
- Srivatsa as Anand
- Vinuth as Dhanraj
- Shreyas Sharma as Yuvaraj
- Gopalkrishna Deshpande as Kesavaditya
- Sadhu Kokila as Inspector Ramakrishna
- Sruthi Hariharan as Guest appearance
- Viswanath Mandalika as Inspector Ajith
- Bharath GB as Loki
- Vijay Chendoor
- Usha Bhandary
- Abhishek Shetty as YouTuber

== Production ==
=== Development ===
Abhishek Manjunath, making his directorial debut, wrote the story, screenplay, and dialogues. The film was conceptualized during the COVID-19 lockdown when director Abhishek M initially planned it as a short film but later expanded it into a full-length feature. Produced by H.K. Prakash (known for RangiTaranga), the project aimed to blend humor with a thrilling narrative. Principal photography was completed in mid-2025.

Actor Ajay Rao was originally announced as the lead actor when the project was first revealed in late October 2022. The film was introduced as a collaboration between Ajay Rao and debutant director Abhishek M, with producer H.K. Prakash backing the project. Ajay Rao even hinted at unveiling the first look of his 30th film under his own production around that time. However, the casting changed later, and Ajay Rao was replaced by Dheekshith Shetty as the lead actor during production updates in mid-2024.

=== Marketing ===
The film's first look poster was released in July 2025 while the teaser dropped on 13 July 2025, highlighting the comic twist of the heist. The official trailer was released on 15 November 2025. Promotions included music launches and interviews with the cast. The teaser and songs trended on YouTube under MRT Music

=== Filming ===
Filming took place across Karnataka, including Bengaluru, Mysuru, and rural locations to capture the village backdrop. Some sequences were shot in Dharwad and surrounding districts. The production design was handled by Raghu Mysore and editing by Tejas R.

== Soundtrack ==
Bank of Bhagyalakshmi

Soundtrack album by Judah Sandhy
- Released: 2025
- Recorded: 2024
- Genre: Feature film soundtrack
- Length: 7:30
- Language: Kannada
- Producer: Judah Sandhy

The music and background score of the film is composed by Judah Sandhy. The soundtrack was released in October 2025. Music rights are with MRT Music, and the songs have garnered millions of views on YouTube.

Kannada Track listing
No.	Title	Lyrics	Singer(s)	Length
1.	"Hara Om"	Nagarjun Sharma	Shilpa Mudbidri	4:05
2.	"Apsare"	Nagarjun Sharma	Rajat Hegde	3:25
Total length:				7:30

Telugu Track listing
No.	Title	Lyrics	Singer(s)	Length
1.	"Hara Om"	Nagarjun Sharma	Mangli	4:05
2.	"Apsara"	Nagarjun Sharma	Rajat Hegde	3:25
Total length:				7:30

== Release ==
The film was scheduled for a theatrical release on 21 November 2025, coinciding with multiple Kannada releases. It was also reported that the Telugu version also would release simultaneously. However, on 20 November, it was postponed to 28 November.
