= Arjun Janya =

Indian music composer

- Born: Lokesh Kumar; May 13, 1980 (age 46); Bengaluru, Karnataka, India
- Genres: Film score, soundtrack
- Occupations: Composer singer Director
- Instruments: Vocals; guitar; Keyboard
- Years active: 2006–present
- Website: arjunjanya.in

Arjun Janya (born Lokesh Kumar on 13 May 1980) is an Indian film score and soundtrack composer, playback singer and director who works primarily in Kannada cinema. He made his debut as a music director with Autograph Please (2006), and rose to prominence with Birugaali (2009), followed by breakthrough success with Sanchari (2010) and Kempegowda (2011). He has composed for successful films including Varadanayaka (2012), Victory (2013), Vajrakaya (2015), Mukunda Murari (2016) and The Villain (2018); his 100th film as a music director was 99 (2019).

Janya is a recipient of the Karnataka State Film Award for Best Music Director (Alemaari, 2012), SIIMA Award for Best Music Director (Romeo, 2012; Vajrakaya, 2016; Roberrt, 2022), and two Filmfare Awards South (Bhajarangi, 2013 & Krishnam Pranaya Sakhi, 2024).

== Early life ==
Arjun Janya was born Lokesh Kumar in Bengaluru, Karnataka, on 13 May 1980. Before becoming an independent composer, he apprenticed under Kannada composers V. Manohar and K. Kalyan, and worked as a keyboard player on approximately 30 films, a period he credits with learning the technical grammar of film music.

== Career ==
=== Film score ===
Arjun's first release as a music director was Autograph Please (2006) starring Sanjjanaa and Dilip Raj. Since then, he composed for various films but with little success until he scored the music for the film Birugaali in 2009. All the songs of this film were noticed and appreciated. Following this, he tasted success by scoring for the film Sanchari in 2010.

His mainstream breakthrough came with Kempe Gowda (2011), a remake of the Tamil blockbuster Singam, which was a star-led commercial success. Around this time, he adopted the professional name Arjun Janya, reportedly on an astrologer's suggestion and with actor Sudeepa’s encouragement. Some articles report that a meeting between Arjun and Oscar-winning composer A. R. Rahman changed his fortunes in the music industry.

In 2012, Janya's work on Romeo won SIIMA Best Music Director, while his score for Alemaari received the Karnataka State Film Award for Best Music Director. The period also saw Victory (2013) yield the widely circulated song “Khaali Quarter”. The song became popular and was on top of the charts for many weeks.

Janya remained active across genres with albums for Dil Rangeela, Super Ranga, and Vajrakaya (2015), the latter marking his 50th film composition and winning SIIMA Best Music Director in 2016. Between 2017 and 2019 he scored for Hebbuli, Chakravarthy, The Villain, and 99 (his 100th film as music director). During promotions for 99, he emphasized “nostalgia with freshness” in the album's approach.

In the early 2020s, Janya released albums including Love 360 (2022), Gaalipata 2 (2022), Baanadariyalli (2023), and Krishnam Pranaya Sakhi (2024), while expanding multilingual releases across streaming platforms.

=== Film direction ===
Janya's directorial debut, 45, features Shivarajkumar, Upendra, and Raj B. Shetty in lead roles. Pre-release coverage highlighted its extensive use of visual effects (with Canadian studio MARZ's involvement) and an unusual production workflow in which a complete animated previsualization of the film was created prior to principal photography. Janya has described 45 as a commercial film with motifs drawn from Sanatana Dharma and stated that the full-animation previsualization took around 18 months, with the live-action shoot completed in 106 days.

=== Television shows ===
Arjun is currently judging the Kannada version of the reality singing show, Sa Re Ga Ma Pa in Zee Kannada channel along with singer Vijay Prakash and music composer Hamsalekha.

== Personal life ==
Janya is married to Geetha, and the couple has a daughter. In television, he has served as a judge on the Kannada edition of the reality singing show Sa Re Ga Ma Pa Kannada on Zee Kannada.

== Discography ==
=== As a composer ===
List of Arjun Janya film credits as composer
Year	Title	Notes
2006	Autograph Please	
2007	Aathmarpane	Background score only
2007	Dadagiri	Background score only
2007	Bhaktha	Background score only
2007	Yuga	
2008	Slum Bala	
2008	Patre Loves Padma	
2008	Dheemaku	
2008	Baba	
2009	Machcha	
2009	Birugaali	Won—South Scope Award for Best Music Director
2010	Nayaka	
2010	Gubbi	
2010	Nam Areal Ond Dina	
2010	Sanchari	Won—Suvarna Award for Best Song
2010	Jugaari	
2011	Jarasandha	
2011	Rajadhani	
2011	Kempegowda	Won—South Scope Award for Best Stylish Music Album; Won—Kadiri Award for Best Music Director
2012	Rambo	
2012	18th Cross	
2012	Romeo	Won—SIIMA Award for Best Music Director
2012	Dandupalya	
2012	Alemaari	Won—Karnataka State Film Award for Best Music Director
2012	Alemaari	Nominated—Filmfare Award for Best Music Director – Kannada
2012	Lucky	Cameo appearance
2012	Tuglak	
2013	Guest House	
2013	Bhajarangi	Won—Filmfare Award for Best Music Director – Kannada
2013	Chaddi Dosth	
2013	Sweety Nanna Jodi	
2013	Dilwala	
2013	Barfi	
2013	Victory	
2013	Jayammana Maga	
2013	Case No. 18/9	
2013	Auto Raja	
2013	Chathrigalu Saar Chathrigalu	
2013	Rajanikantha	
2013	Varadanayaka	Won—SIIMA Award for Best Male Playback Singer
2014	Abhimanyu	Also made in Tamil and Telugu as Jai Hind 2
2014	Neenade Naa	
2014	Simhadri	
2014	Super Ranga	
2014	Paramashiva	
2014	Tirupathi Express	
2014	Adyaksha	Nominated—Filmfare Award for Best Music Director – Kannada
2014	Paru Wife of Devadas	
2014	Maanikya	
2014	Dil Rangeela	
2014	Shivajinagara	Background score only
2014	Darling	Also producer
2014	Angaaraka	
2015	Ganga	
2015	Dove	
2015	Arjuna	
2015	Om Namaha	
2015	RX Soori	
2015	Bullet Basya	
2015	Vajrakaya	50th film as a composer
2015	Goa	
2015	DK	
2015	Raja Rajendra	
2015	Jackson	
2016	Mukunda Murari	Nominated—SIIMA Award for Best Music Director (Kannada)
2016	Mungaru Male 2	Nominated—Filmfare Award for Best Music Director – Kannada
2016	Kalpana 2	
2016	Lakshmana	
2016	Jigarthanda	
2016	Style King	
2016	Jai Maruthi 800	
2016	Mareyalaare	
2016	Ricky	
2016	Kathe Chitrakathe Nirdeshana Puttanna	
2016	John Jani Janardhan	
2017	Chowka	Only for 2 songs ("Appa I Love You" and "Vande Mataram")
2017	Chakravarthy	
2017	Hebbuli	
2017	Raaga	
2017	Pataki	
2017	Sarkari Kelasa Devara Kelasa	
2017	Tiger	
2017	Dandupalya 2	
2017	Raj Vishnu	
2017	Tarak	
2017	Satya Harishchandra	
2017	College Kumar	
2018	Dandupalya 3	
2018	Raambo 2	
2018	Kannadakkaagi Ondannu Otti	
2018	Kicchu	
2018	Ayogya	Nominated—SIIMA Award for Best Music Director -Kannada
2018	Victory 2	
2018	Ambi Ning Vayassaytho	
2018	The Villain	
2019	Kavacha	
2019	Premier Padmini	
2019	99	100th film
2019	Amar	
2019	Gimmick	
2019	Pailwaan	
2019	Ellidde Illi Tanaka	
2019	Bharaate	
2019	Odeya	
2020	India vs England	
2021	Roberrt	
2021	Kotigobba 3	
2021	SriKrishna@gmail.com	
2021	Rider	
2021	Bhajarangi 2	
2022	Ek Love Ya	
2022	Local Train	
2022	Avatara Purusha	
2022	Window Seat	
2022	Gaalipata 2	
2022	Kaneyadavara Bagge Prakatane	
2022	Love 360	
2022	Shiva 143	
2022	Trivikrama	
2022	Dilpasand	
2022	Raymo	
2022	Vedha	
2022	Once Upon a Time in Jamaligudda	125th Film as a Music Composer
2022	Padavi Poorva	
2023	Love Birds	
2023	Kousalya Supraja Rama	
2023	Kick	Tamil film
2023	Baanadariyalli	
2023	Raja Marthanda	
2023	Ghost	
2023	Mayanagari	
2023	WoW: World of Windows	
2023	Ardhambardha Prema Kathe	
2024	Upadhyaksha	
2024	Krishnam Pranaya Sakhi	Won—Filmfare Award for Best Music Director – Kannada
2024	Karki Nanu BA, LLB	
2024	Murphy	
2024	Aaraam Arvind Swamy	
2025	Brat	
2025	Bad	
2025	45	Debut as Director
2026	Cult	
2026	Rakkasapuradhol	
2026	KD: The Devil	
2026	Ayogya 2	
TBA	Trishulam †	Filming

Key
†	Denotes films that have not yet been released

=== As a singer ===
Year	Film	Song	Notes
2012	Romeo	Belagageddu Coffee	
2012	Romeo	Smile Vasi	
2012	Romeo	Romeo Romeo	
2012	Lucky	Gowramma Baramma	
2012	Lucky	Naan Yen Madli	
2012	Rambo	Manethanka Baare	
2013	Varadanayaka	Baite Baite	
2013	Varadanayaka	Ondhsari	
2014	Mrugashira	Oota Madro Dayavittu	
2014	Super Ranga	Ninade Nenapu	
2017	Kataka	Kataka Title Track	

Television

- Weekend with Ramesh season 3

== Notes ==
- Arjun Janya hits 25
- Tunes 'Gods Gift' – Arjun Janya
