= Brindavana =

2013 Indian film by K. Madesh

- Film poster
- Directed by: K Madesh
- Screenplay by: K. Madesh
- Based on: Brindavanam (2010) by Vamsi Paidipally
- Produced by: Suresh Gowda; S Srinivasa Murthy
- Starring: Darshan; Karthika Nair; Milana Nagaraj
- Cinematography: Ramesh Babu
- Edited by: K. M. Prakash
- Music by: V. Harikrishna
- Production company: Sri Seethabaireshwara Productions
- Distributed by: Thoogudeepa Distributions
- Release date: 26 September 2013
- Country: India
- Language: Kannada

Brindavana is a 2013 Indian Kannada-language romantic action comedy film starring Darshan, Karthika Nair (in her only Kannada film), Milana Nagaraj and also featuring Saikumar and Sampath Raj. The film was directed by K Madesh and produced by Suresh Gowda. The soundtrack was composed by V. Harikrishna and the cinematography was by Ramesh Babu. it is remake of the 2010 Telugu film Brindavanam. The film was later dubbed into Hindi as Ghayal: The Power Man by Sumeet Arts in 2014.

== Plot ==
The main story of the film is about two step brothers. They are rival big shots in their village. Bhoomi and Madhu are cousins of theirs. Bhoomi stays in the village, but Madhu relocates for her studies to the city where Darshan lives. The two meet when he helps her, become friends, and eventually fall in love.

Meanwhile, Bhoomi's marriage is arranged with some goonda whom she does not want to marry. She asks Madhu to help her; she in turn asks Darshan to help. He goes to the village intending to prevent the marriage using tricks. He ends up solving many problems in the village and finally putting an end to the rivalry between Madhu and Bhoomi's fathers, leading to a happy ending.

== Cast ==
- Darshan as Krishna
- Karthika Nair as Bhoomi
- Milana Nagaraj as Madhu
- Saikumar as Madhu's father
- Sampath Raj as Bhoomi's father
- Ajay as Varadha, Bhoomi's cousin
- Jai Jagadish
- Doddanna
- Sangeetha
- Sarath Babu
- Nirosha as Madhu's Mother
- Kuri Prathap
- Prakash Heggodu
- Sadhu Kokila
- Veena Sundar
- Geetha
- Killer Venkatesh
- Prabhakar
- Mohan Juneja
- Stunt Siddu
- Ramesh Babu

== Production ==
Principal shooting for Brindavana formally began on 16 February 2013, which happened to be the birthday of lead actor Darshan. Actors Ambareesh and V. Ravichandran were the chief guests invited for the launch at the Kanteerava Studios in Bangalore. The film marks the first Kannada production set to shoot in Iceland.

While Darshan and Karthika (in her first and only Kannada film to date) had the lead roles, the second female lead role was first offered to Vedhika. Malayalam actress Muktha replaced her in the role, and still later it went to newcomer Milana Nagaraj.

== Soundtrack ==
The music was composed by V. Harikrishna and released by D-Beats.

Brindavana

Soundtrack album by V. Harikrishna
- Released: September 5, 2013
- Recorded: 2013
- Genre: Soundtrack
- Length: 22:18
- Label: D-Beats
- Producer: V. Harikrishna

Track list
No.	Title	Lyrics	Singer(s)	Length
1.	"Hearttalliro"	Kaviraj	Tippu	4:29
2.	"Bellam Belaga"	V. Nagendra Prasad	Shreya Ghoshal, Hemanth	4:54
3.	"Mirchi Hudugi"	Kaviraj	Santhosh Venky	4:26
4.	"Oye Kalla"	Yogaraj Bhat	Upendra Rao, Priyadarshini, Indu Nagaraj	4:24
5.	"Thangali"	V. Nagendra Prasad	Karthik, Shankar Mahadevan, Hemanth, Kailash Kher	4:05
Total length:				22:18

== Release ==
Brindavana was released on 26 September in more than 190 theaters. Some other films, including Sakkare, Sweety Nanna Jodi, and Dilwala postponed their release to avoid clashing with it.

The satellite telecast rights were offered up to a price of ₹5.40 crore, making it the second highest-priced Kannada-language film.

=== Critical reception ===
A critic from The Times of India rated the film 3.5/5 stars and wrote that the director "has excellently mixed comedy, action, sentiments and romance with rich lively narration that perfectly suits the character of Darshan". Shyam Prasad S of the Bangalore Mirror rated the film 2.5/5 and wrote, "Overall, Brindavana is a seen-all and done-all movie that just got bigger, but not necessarily better". A critic from Sify wrote, "Director K. Madesh has managed to bring in the family audiences to the theatre with a mixture of melodrama and comedy. Producers P.S. Sarinivasmurthy and D. Suresh Gowda have invested on the right man, because if it was not for Darshan, Brindavana could have sunk without a trace".
