= Love Mocktail 2 =

2022 film by Krishna

- Theatrical release poster
- Directed by: Darling Krishna
- Written by: Darling Krishna
- Produced by: Darling Krishna; Milana Nagaraj
- Starring: Darling Krishna; Milana Nagaraj; Rachel David; Amrutha Iyengar
- Cinematography: Sri Crazy Mindz
- Edited by: Sri Crazy Mindz
- Music by: Nakul Abhyankar
- Production company: Krishna Talkies
- Distributed by: KRG Studios
- Release date: 11 February 2022
- Country: India
- Language: Kannada

Love Mocktail 2 is a 2022 Indian Kannada-language romantic drama film written and directed by Darling Krishna, who produced the film with his wife Milana Nagaraj. Krishna and Milana also star, alongside Rachel David. The film serves as a sequel to Love Mocktail (2020). The plot follows the life of Adi who is coping with the death of his wife Nidhi and tries to move on.

Krishna completed the script work of the sequel by June 2020. It was filmed and edited by Sri Crazy Mindz while Nakul Abhyankar composed the music. Love Mocktail 2 was released theatrically on 11 February 2022. The film received positive reviews from critics and became the eight highest grossing Kannada film of the year.

== Plot ==
Following the events of the previous film, Vijay (Viju) and Sushma go to a police station to report Adi as missing after he switches off his phone. When asked, they narrate what happened so far.

After Nidhi's death, Adi spends two years in depression. One day, Sushma realizes that she has a letter that Nidhi had written to him if he can't forget her. She and Vijay go to deliver it to him, but they see he has stopped grieving and gotten back together with Jyo and decide not to hand over the letter to Adi. However, it turns out he took the letter anyway and reads it. Adi starts looking for love with the help of Vijay and a matchmaker, Jakana, but finds that all the women that he meets had known him from earlier incidents. Vijay and Sushma see him with Jyo again and confront him, but they find out that they're not meeting as lovers and, shockingly, that Adi has been hallucinating Nidhi the whole time, and she has been providing him guidance based on the letter, which asked him to find a new wife to take care of him. They go to a psychiatrist, who gives him medicine, and he decides to accept Sihi as his new wife, who had a crush on him since his college days. However, Sihi's family doesn't accept him due to his previous marriage; to alleviate this, Adi and Sihi visit her grandfather to approve of their marriage.

Adi doesn't take his medicine, and he still gets advice from Nidhi. When they arrive at his country home, Adi tries to impress her grandfather based on Nidhi's suggestions, but they end up backfiring. Sihi's grandfather was particularly loyal to his wife, and didn't marry anyone else after she died, which makes him distrust Adi. Additionally, Adi and Sihi end up meeting Aditi, who has come to the area on her honeymoon, and is unimpressed with his new escapades as he had claimed that Nidhi's love is enough for one lifetime in the last film. One day, he asks Adi if he remembers his wife; although Nidhi tells him to say no, Adi reveals that he sees her as someone who is a part of him. The next day, Adi is told to go to the temple, where Sihi and her grandfather are; he states that he underestimated Adi and grants his approval. However, Sihi rejects Adi, revealing that she found out he still sees Nidhi, and tells him to leave. Afterwards, the visions of Nidhi leave as well. When Vijay calls to tell him a corny joke about the "misery" of marriage, Adi calls him out, pointing out that despite being in a love marriage he doesn't show affection to his wife, and turns off his phone. He picks up Sihi's grandfather's live-in maid, who reveals her own struggles after her husband died but relates how she found a new life in her son, also named Adi. Inspired, Adi finds an orphanage and adopts a girl he names Nidhi.

Back in the present, Adi calls Vijay and Sushma to tell them he is coming back, cryptically stating that he has found Nidhi.

== Cast ==
- Darling Krishna as Aditya "Adi"
- Milana Nagaraj as Nidhima "Nidhi"
- Rachel David as Sihi
- Amrutha Iyengar as Joshitha "Jo" (Cameo appearance)
- Abhilash as Viju
- Kushi Achar as Sushma
- Rachana Inder as Aditi (Cameo appearance)
- Sushmitha Gowda as Jakana
- Shwetha as Renu
- Ravi Sitararam as Sihi's grandfather
- Shivoo Koteshwar as Psychiatrist
- Giri Shivanna as Police Inspector

== Production ==
=== Development ===
Darling Krishna announced Love Mocktail 2, following the success of his 2020 film Love Mocktail. He completed the script work by June 2020. Krishna added a lot of humour to the sequel unlike the original which was an emotional romantic drama. Nakul Abhyankar was signed as the composer for the sequel, replacing Raghu Dixit. Malayalam actress Rachel David was cast in the film, marking her debut in Kannada cinema.

=== Filming ===
Filming took place between August 2020 and 2021. The first schedule of the film was shot in August 2020 in Bangalore with minimum crew, and Krishna intended to wrap up the entire shoot by December. Around 60% of the film was shot by October 2020, and the team began editing the filmed portions.

Krishna and Milana took a break from shoot following their wedding in February 2021 and the film was delayed due to the COVID-19 pandemic. The production was resumed in June 2021 in Ladakh where a montage was shot, and returned to Bangalore. The filming was completed by August 2021.

== Music ==
The soundtrack album consists of six singles composed by Nakul Abhyankar with lyrics written by Raghavendra Kamat.

Love Mocktail 2 (Original Motion Picture Soundtrack)
No.	Title	Singer(s)	Length
1.	"Ninadene Januma"	Nakul Abhyankar	4:46
2.	"Ee Prema"	Ramya Bhat Abhayankar	5:17
3.	"Ide Swarga"	Sanjith Hegde	3:26
4.	"Sanchariyagu Nee"	Vijay Prakash, Rakshita Suresh	4:42
5.	"O Nidhima"	Nakul Abhyankar, Rakshita Suresh	3:43
6.	"Neenallave"	Nakul Abhyankar	2:37
Total length:			24:31

== Release ==
In December 2021, Love Mocktail 2 was confirmed to release on 11 February 2022. Though the final copy of the film was ready by October 2021, Krishna and Milana preferred a February release to coincide with the Valentine's Day weekend. KRG Studios has acquired the distribution rights of the film.

== Reception ==
=== Critical reception ===
The film received overall positive reviews. Reviewing the film for The New Indian Express, A. Sharadhaa called Love Mocktail 2 a "perfect blend of love and laughter." On performances, she wrote, "Krishna effortlessly continues from where he left off in Love Mocktail, and the other actors too chip in with effective performances," particularly noting Abhilash, Sushmitha, and Sushma for their humour. Deccan Herald's Vivek M V said: "The magic is still intact," and called Nidhi as the soul of the franchise. "The humour finds purpose and the drama gets engaging and even delightfully mature. Krishna's lazy elegance and brooding expressions along with Nakul Abhayankar's music complement the film's poignant mood," he added.

Sunayana Suresh of The Times of India, stated it was "a heart-warming journey, filled with loads of laughter." While appreciating the film for the most part, she said that the latter half, mainly the lead-up to the climax, was underwhelming. Prathibha Joy of OTT Play gave a mixed review for the film. While Joy praised the characters and former half, she felt that the humour was forced at times.

=== Box office ===
The first day net collection of Love Mocktail 2 was estimated to be ₹ 1.45 crore. In its first week, the film collected ₹ 10.94 crore. The total collection of the film was estimate ₹ 21 crore, making it the eight highest grossing Kannada film of the year.

== Awards and nominations ==
Year	Award	Category	Recipient	Result	Ref.
2023	11th South Indian International Movie Awards	Best Film – Kannada	Krishna Talkies	Nominated	
2023	11th South Indian International Movie Awards	Best Director – Kannada	Krishna	Nominated	
2023	11th South Indian International Movie Awards	Best Music Director – Kannada	Nakul Abhyankar	Nominated	
2023	11th South Indian International Movie Awards	Best Lyricist – Kannada	Raghavendra Kamath (for "Ide Swarga")	Nominated	
2023	4th Chandanavana Film Critics Academy Awards	Best Debut Actress	Rachel David	Nominated	
2023	4th Chandanavana Film Critics Academy Awards	Best Screenplay	Krishna	Won	
2023	4th Chandanavana Film Critics Academy Awards	Best Lyrics	Raghavendra Kamat (for "Sanchariyagu Nee")	Nominated	
2023	4th Chandanavana Film Critics Academy Awards	Best Editing	Sri Crazy Mindz	Nominated	
