= Jani (film) =

- Directed by: P. K. H. Das
- Written by: P. K. H. Das
- Produced by: J. Janakiram; M. Aravind
- Starring: Vijay Raghavendra; Milana Nagaraj; Janani Anthony
- Edited by: K. Sasi Kumar
- Music by: Jassie Gift
- Production company: Aishwarya Film Productions
- Distributed by: Jayanna Films
- Release date: 11 August 2017
- Country: India
- Language: Kannada

Jani is a 2017 Indian Kannada-language action romance film written and directed by cinematographer P. K. H. Das, in his debut film direction. The film stars Vijay Raghavendra, Milana Nagaraj and Janani Anthony in the lead roles. Suman, Rangayana Raghu, Sadhu Kokila and choreographer Mugur Sundar appear in key supporting roles. The film is produced by J. Janakiram and M. Aravind under Aishwarya Film Productions banner.

The film marks musician Jassie Gift's 25th film as a composer. The project also marks choreographer Chinni Prakash's return to Kannada cinema after 20 years. The film is set to release on 11 August 2017.

== Cast ==
- Vijay Raghavendra as Jani
- Milana Nagaraj
- Janani Anthony
- Suman
- Rangayana Raghu
- Sadhu Kokila
- Shobharaj
- Sumithra
- Mugur Sundar (guest appearance)
- Chitra Shukla (guest appearance in the song "Bangade Bangade")

== Soundtrack ==
Jani

Soundtrack album by Jassie Gift
- Recorded: 2017
- Genre: Feature film soundtrack
- Label: T-Series Kannada

The original soundtrack for the film is composed by Jassie Gift, marking his 25th film. T-Series music label acquired the music album rights.

Track list
No.	Title	Lyrics	Singer(s)	Length
1.	"Jani Jani"	Chandan Shetty	Chandan Shetty, Jassie Gift
2.	"Bangade Bangade"	Raj Kiran	Sayanora Philip, Shashank Sheshagiri
3.	"Ellellu Neene"	Shivananje Gowda	Udit Narayan, Shweta Mohan
4.	"Kaddu Kaddu Nodi"	Raj Kiran	Shreya Ghoshal, Shashank Sheshagiri
5.	"Don't Worry Be Happy"	Raj Kiran	Vijay Prakash, Jassie Gift

== Reception ==
A critic from The Times of India wrote that "If the 80s and 90s style commercial dramas are your favourite then you could go for this. Though, you could always choose a DVD from that era instead too". A critic from Vijaya Karnataka wrote that "Connoisseurs who want to see Vijay Raghavendra in a new role have no problem watching Jani".
