= Lucky Man (2022 film) =

2022 Kannada language film

- Poster
- Directed by: Nagendra Prasad
- Written by: Ashwath Marimuthu; Manju Mandavya; Sampath Sirimane
- Based on: Oh My Kadavule (2020) by Ashwath Marimuthu
- Produced by: P.R. Meenakshi Sundaram; R Sundara Kamaraj
- Starring: Darling Krishna; Sangeetha Sringeri; Roshni Prakash
- Cinematography: Jeeva Shankar
- Edited by: J. V. Manikanda Balaji
- Music by: V2 Vijay Vicky
- Production company: Parsa Pictures Pvt. Ltd.
- Release date: 9 September 2022
- Country: India
- Language: Kannada

Lucky Man is a 2022 Indian Kannada-language romantic comedy film directed by S Nagendra Prasad in his directorial debut. The film stars Puneeth Rajkumar in an extended cameo, Darling Krishna, Sangeetha Sringeri, Sadhu Kokila, Roshni Prakash, Nagabhushana and Prabhu Deva. Produced under the banner of Parsa Pictures, it is a remake of the 2020 Tamil film Oh My Kadavule.

Lucky Man marks the second last film appearance of Puneeth Rajkumar, in an extended cameo. It received mixed to positive reviews and became the tenth highest grossing Kannada film of the year.

== Plot ==
Anu, Arjun Nagappa and Shetty are best friends since childhood. During a party to celebrate Arjun clearing his Engineering arrear exams, Anu tells the other two of her father looking for a groom for her. She suddenly asks Arjun if he'd like to marry her, to which he agrees. One year later, Anu and Arjun are seen sitting in family court for the final hearing of their divorce case. A man named Baby sits behind Arjun and predicts that he will not get his divorce on that day as his wife will faint and be rushed to hospital, then he provides him a visiting card and disappears. To Arjun's shock, all the events predicted by the stranger turn out true and the case is postponed to evening. Arjun rushes to the address mentioned on the visiting card. There, he encounters the man, who introduces himself as God. Arjun explains his problems to God.

Arjun, after marriage, continues to treat Anu as a friend and things are smooth until he starts working in Anu's father's toilet manufacturing factory as a quality control checker. Arjun hates this job, but becomes accustomed to it and is unable to see Anu as anything more than a friend and is totally bored by the monotony of his life. One day, he meets Meera, his school senior and childhood crush, who now works as an assistant film director. They strike up a friendship, with Meera encouraging Arjun to explore his passion for acting and requesting him to audition for Yogaraj Bhat's upcoming film. The audition goes very well, with Arjun impressing the director with his performance. Later at a pub, Meera tells Arjun about her failed film-making attempts and a past break-up. Arjun consoles Meera and hugs her, but this is noticed by Anu, who is already sad at Arjun not reciprocating her feelings and assumes they are having an extramarital affair. Anu and Arjun have a nasty quarrel, which ends with Arjun asking for divorce.

Back in the present, Arjun blames God for his current situation. So God gives Arjun a second chance to rectify the mistake with a golden ticket with three conditions - The ticket should stay with Arjun always, he should tell nobody about this ticket, and if at all he tells anyone about the ticket, he will die. Accepting the conditions, Arjun grabs the ticket and time travels to the night where he accepted Anu's marriage proposal.

This time, Arjun rejects Anu's proposal. Therefore, Anu decides to marry the groom chosen by her father. Meanwhile, Arjun decides to pursue Meera, feeling that she is the right person for him. They strike a friendship, with Arjun removing all barriers which caused Meera's film-making attempts to fail in the original timeline. Arjun also decides to pursue acting as a career and Anu manages to convince his parents on the same. Meera soon starts to reciprocate Arjun's interest for her. Arjun also has a chance to perform in audition for a film to be directed by Yogaraj Bhat, and is selected for final audition to be held a month later. He goes to tell Anu's father about this news and has a deep conversation with him. Anu's father tells Arjun that he hails from a very backward village in Gulbarga and his mother had died 50 years ago by snake bite, due to lack of toilets. He then left village as a teenager, with the mission of eradicating open defecation in his area. That led to him creating his latrine company and achieving his goal of bringing toilets to his native village. This revelation makes Arjun realise his mistake of ridiculing their business.

Anu learns that Arjun likes Meera and there is fair chance that Meera might reciprocate his love too. So Anu offers to help Arjun to propose Meera, asking him to make a video for Meera's upcoming birthday with wishes from Meera's family/friends and propose her at the end of the video. As a result, they go on a bike ride to Gokarna, which is Meera's home town. By this time, through various instances, Arjun had started to realise how sweet and loving Anu is, and how supportive Anu's father was. During the trip, Arjun realises that he really loves Anu and that his interest towards Meera is just an infatuation. While on the Gokarna trip, Arjun and Anu come across Meera's ex-boyfriend, who broke up with Meera to focus on his boxing career, however, he has also not gotten over her. Arjun decides to reunite Meera and Krishna instead and modifies the video accordingly. Meera reconciles with Krishna on her birthday after watching the video.

Arjun attends Anu's wedding with a heavy heart. Unable to express his feelings for Anu, Arjun walks out of the church with Shetty. At this juncture, they see Anu running out of the church without getting married. They meet her in their usual hangout pub, where she reveals her love for Arjun and also adds that she knew his feelings for her, hence she cancelled the wedding at the last minute. But Arjun again refuses to marry her as he does not want to hurt her again. When confronted by Anu and Shetty, he blurts out about the second chance and the golden ticket. Immediately the ticket flies away from Arjun and in a bid to catch it, he is fatally struck by a lorry.

Arjun finds himself with God once again and pleads for one final chance; this time God states that no further chances will be given to him and sends him away, asking him to take care of his own problems. Then Arjun realises that he is back in reality; on the day his divorce hearing is taking place. He rushes back to the court, where Anu is ready to give consent to the divorce. This time, Arjun refuses divorce and confesses his love to Anu. Anu accepts Arjun's love and reunites with him. It is revealed that God has given Arjun yet another chance and blesses him to go and live happily with Anu.

== Cast ==
- Puneeth Rajkumar in an extended cameo appearance as God
- Darling Krishna as Arjun Nagappa
- Sangeetha Sringeri as Anu Anthony Doniyappa
- Roshni Prakash as Meera
- Nagabhushana as Shetty
- Rangayana Raghu as Anthony Doniyappa; Anu's father
- Sundar Raj as Arjun's father
- Sudha Belawadi as Arjun's mother
- Sadhu Kokila as God's assistant
- Yogaraj Bhat in a guest appearance as himself
- Prabhu Deva in a special appearance in "Baaro Raja"

== Soundtrack ==
Lucky Man

Soundtrack album by V2 Vijay Vicky
- Released: 19 September 2022
- Genre: Feature film soundtrack
- Language: Kannada
- Label: MRT Music

Singles from Lucky Man
- 1. "Manasella Neene" Released: 10 August 2022; 2. "Baaro Raja" Released: 23 August 2022; 3. "Friendship Song" Released: 6 September 2022

External audio
- Official Audio Jukebox on YouTube

V2 Vijay Vicky composed the soundtrack.

All lyrics are written by Dhananjay Ranjan.

No.	Title	Singer(s)	Length
1.	"Manasella Neene"	Sanjith Hegde	4:32
2.	"Baaro Raja"	Benny Dayal	4:44
3.	"Friendship Song"	M. M. Manasi, Adithya RK	3:28
4.	"Haiyayo"	Benny Dayal, V2 Vijay Vicky	2:36
5.	"Dhoora Dhoora"	Adithya RK	3:01
6.	"Preethi Kunisidhey"	Yazin Nizar	3:54
7.	"Eedhentha Life U Yaar"	V2 Vijay Vicky	2:52
8.	"Haiyayo V2"	Christopher Stanley	2:36
9.	"Dhinnapora"	V2 Vijay Vicky, M. M. Monissha	2:18
10.	"Baaro Raja V2"	Vijay Prakash	4:44
