= Bad (2025 film) =

2025 Indian Kannada-language action thriller film

- Theatrical release poster
- Directed by: PC Shekhar
- Written by: PC Shekhar
- Dialogues by: Sachin Jagadeshwar SB
- Produced by: SR Venkatesh Gowda
- Starring: Nakul Gowda; Manvita Kamath
- Cinematography: D. Sakthi Sekar
- Edited by: PC Shekhar
- Music by: Arjun Janya
- Production company: Naada Kiran Pictures
- Release date: 28 March 2025
- Running time: 100 minutes
- Country: India
- Language: Kannada

Bad is a 2025 Indian Kannada-language action thriller film written, directed and edited by PC Shekhar. The film stars Nakul Gowda, Manvita Kamath, Sai Krishna, Apoorva Baradwaj, Ashwini Polepalli, Manjunath Kokate N., and Jagdish Malnad.

== Cast ==
- Nakul Gowda as Veda
- Manvita Kamath
- Sai Krishna as Naga
- Apoorva Bharadwaj as Anu
- Ashwini Polepalli
- Manjunath Kokate N.
- Jagdish Malnad
- Kaddipudi Chandru as Manisharma

== Soundtrack ==
The soundtrack was composed by Arjun Janya.

Track listing
No.	Title	Lyrics	Singer(s)	Length
1.	"Rise From The Moon"	Nishan Rai	Aishwarya Rangarajan, Nishan Rai	2:50
2.	"Mathigu Mathigu"	Kaviraj	Prithwi Bhat, Sunil Gujagonda	2:40
3.	"Nee Baruve Antha"	Kaviraj	Prithwi Bhat	3:13

== Release ==
Bad was released theatrically on 28 March 2025.

== Reception ==
Y. Maheswara Reddy of Bangalore Mirror rated the film three out of five stars and wrote, "Some scenes and dialogues, especially the fight for the post of a tractor driver, are incongruous. All in all, the movie is worth a watch if you like crime thrillers." A. Sharadhaa of Cinema Express wrote, "Despite its many strengths, BAD is not without its flaws. It occasionally feels repetitive, as the narrative circles around the same issue. The film’s relatively short duration also means that certain aspects are underdeveloped."

A critic from Asianet News rated the film three out of five. A critic from Udayavani reviewed the film. S. Shyam Prasad of CiniMirror rated the film 3/5 stars, describing it as a psychological study of the six vices and noting its multiple-perspective narrative and performances by the cast.
