= Hara Hara Mahadeva (TV series) =

Television series

- Written by: Utkarsh Naithani; Mihir Bhuta
- Directed by: Deepak Garg (show); Nitin Gopi (episode) Shivaraj Madhugiri (episode); Srinivas Prasad (episode)
- Country of origin: India
- Original language: Kannada
- No. of seasons: 13
- No. of episodes: 421

Production
- Executive producer: Vinayak Jain
- Producer: Nikhil Sinha
- Cinematography: Deepak Garg
- Camera setup: Multi-camera
- Running time: 22 minutes

Original release
- Network: Star Suvarna
- Release: 25 July 2016 – 21 March 2018

Hara Hara Mahadeva is a Kannada mythological television series based on legends of Lord Shiva, also known as Mahadeva. It aired on Star Suvarna beginning 25 July 2016. Star Suvarna, the fourth-largest Kannada channel in India, funded the serial with the largest regional market budget of Rs.60 crore (over US$9 million as of August 2017). It is an official remake of the Hindi television series Devon Ke Dev...Mahadev. It has several nominations for the Suvarna Film Awards. Ajay Devgan said it was a "visual treat" and had many untold stories of Lord Mahadeva. This big budget serial is based on the work by Devdutt Pattanaik. It has aired over 300 episodes and Karthik Parak, head of regional branch programming at Star Suvarna planned to extend it to 500 episodes.

== Crew ==
- Nikhil Sinha, producer
- Deepak Garg, show director and cinematography
- Nitin Gopi, episode director
- Shivaraj Madhugiri, episode director
- Srinivas Prasad, episode director
- Utkarsh Naithani, writer
- Mihir Bhuta, writer

== Cast ==
- Vinay Gowda as Shiva
  Mahadeva
  Kalabhairava
  Veerabhadra
  Jalandhara
- Priyanka Chincholi as Parvati Adi Shakti Durga Bhadrakali
- Sangeetha Sringeri as Sati Dakshayani
- Pallavi Purohit as Lakshmi
- Aryan Raj as Vishnu
- Rajesh Rao as Brahma
- Soori Sarga as Indra
- Samay Wadhwani as Ganesha
  Vinayaka
  Vakratunda
- Neha Saxena as Madanike
- Siddaraj Kalyanakar as Maharshi Dadhichi
- Arun Murthy as Maharshi Kashyapa
- Surya Praveen as Veeravantha
- Karthik Samag as Chandra
- Avit Shetty as Varuna
- Vinayak Desai as Vasuki
- Vishal Hegde as Nandi
- Veena Ponnappa as Prasuti
- Bullet Sreenu as Chakri
- Arjun Nagarakar as Agni
- Purvi Joshi as Ganga
- Keerthi Baanu as Daksha Prajapati
- Pavan Madhukar as Karthikeya
- Rohit Nagesh as King Himavat
- Raghvendra Devadiga as young Karthikeya
