= For Regn =

- Theatrical release poster
- Directed by: Naveen Dwarakanath
- Written by: Naveen Dwarakanath
- Produced by: Naveen Rao
- Starring: Pruthvi Ambaar; Milana Nagaraj; P. Ravishankar
- Cinematography: Abhilash Kalatthi; Abhishek Kasaragod
- Edited by: Manu Shedgar
- Music by: Songs: R. K. Harish; Score: Nakul Abhyankar
- Production company: Nischal Films
- Distributed by: Deepak Gangadhar Films
- Release date: 23 February 2024
- Country: India
- Language: Kannada

For Regn (For Registration) is a 2024 Indian Kannada-language romantic drama film written and directed by Naveen Dwarakanath, in his debut and produced by Naveen Rao. The film features Pruthvi Ambaar and Milana Nagaraj in the lead roles. The film's score is by Nakul Abhyankar and soundtrack is composed by R. K. Harish. To enhance the visual experience, the film's team used Mocobot camera to shoot few scenes and an underwater shot song choreographed by Imran Sardhariya.

The film was released on 23 February 2024 to mixed reviews and underperformed at the box-office.

== Premise ==
The story is about Akshay and Anvita who are secretly married and live a double life and later face many challenges which causes rift in their marriage.

== Cast ==
- Pruthvi Ambaar as Akshay
- Milana Nagaraj as Anvita
- P. Ravishankar
- Babu Hiranaiah as Akshay's father
- Sudha Belawadi as Akshay's mother
- Tabla Nani as himself
- Swathi as Anvita's mother
- Ramesh Bhat
- Sihi Kahi Chandru
- Aravind Bolar
- Bank Janardhan
- M. S. Umesh
- Dingri Nagaraj

== Soundtrack ==
For Regn

Soundtrack album by R. K. Harish
- Released: 2024
- Recorded: 2024
- Genre: Feature film soundtrack
- Label: Jhankar Music
- Producer: R. K. Harish

R. K. Harish has composed the film's soundtrack while Nakul Abhyankar has provided the background score.

All lyrics are written by Nagarjun Sharma.

Track listing
No.	Title	Artist(s)	Length
1.	"Kaddu Kaddu"	Nakul Abhyankar	4:41
2.	"Lovegal Sumadhura"	Airaa Udupi, Deepak Doddera	3:38
3.	"Onde Ondu Saari"	Airaa Udupi	3:55

== Release and reception ==
The film was released across Karnataka on 23 February 2024.

The film opened to mixed reviews from critics and audience. Sridevi S of The Times of India rated the film 3 out of 5 and wrote "For Regn is a rom-com family drama that can be enjoyed with friends and family", praising the cinematography and editing while criticizing the story and writing. Pranitha A. S of Deccan Herald rated the film 2/5 and criticized the movie as "Pointless film with a TV serial vibe. With incessant fights between the couple, lots of melodrama, lousy comedy, cliched dialogues and constant efforts of a cousin to break them up, the film feels more like a TV serial".

== External sources ==
- For Regn at IMDb, Times of India
