= Aaraam Arvind Swamy =

Indian romantic comedy film

- Theatrical release poster
- Directed by: Abhishek Shetty
- Written by: Abhishek Shetty
- Screenplay by: Abhishek Shetty
- Story by: Abhishek Shetty
- Produced by: Shreekanth Prasanna; Prashant Reddy S
- Starring: Aniissh Tejeshwar; Milana Nagaraj; Hrithika Srinivasan
- Cinematography: Shiva Sagar YVB
- Edited by: Umesh R.B.
- Music by: Arjun Janya
- Production companies: Aiikya Studios; 786 Films
- Release date: 22 November 2024
- Country: India
- Language: Kannada

Aaraam Arvind Swamy is a 2024 Indian Kannada-language romantic comedy film directed and written by Abhishek Shetty. The film stars Aniish, Milana Nagaraj and Hrithika Srinivas. Produced under Aiikya Studios and 786 Films, the film's music is composed by Arjun Janya. It was released on 22 November 2024.

== Cast ==
- Aniissh Tejeshwar as Arvind Swamy
- Milana Nagaraj as Geetha
- Hrithika Srinivasan as Lakshmi
- Achyuth Kumar
- Gowrav Shetty
- RJ Vikki

== Production ==
The film marks director Abhishek's third project after Namm Gani BCom Pass (2021) and Gajanana and Gang (2022). He conceptualized the script during the COVID lockdown period in 2022 and planned to cast popular names including Kishore for this project. Besides directing, Abhishek penned the story, screenplay and dialogues for the film. He was also initially set to play the lead role. Later, Aniish was cast as the lead protagonist, whom Abhishek found he would be the "right-fit" for the role. Actress Milana Nagaraj was roped in to play one of the lead female characters in January 2023, marking her first pairing with Aniish. The filming wrapped up in October 2023 and post-production works began right after.

== Marketing ==
As a promotional stance, the makers of the film announced that the film, releasing on 22 November 2024, will be available for booking at an attractive price of ₹99.

== Soundtrack ==
The soundtrack consists of songs composed by Arjun Janya. The audio rights were acquired by WinkWhistle Productions owned by Aniish.

Track listing
No.	Title	Lyrics	Singer(s)	Length
1.	"Munde Hego Yeno"	Pramod Maravanthe	Nihal Tauro	3:17
2.	"Hudukutha Hode"	Anoop Ramaswamy	Jaskaran Singh	3:28
3.	"Aaram Aravinda Swamy"	Nagarjun Sharma	Nishan Rai	3:51
Total length:				12:33
