= Madarangi =

- Official poster
- Directed by: Mallikarjun Muthalageri
- Produced by: Nagappa
- Starring: Krishna; Sushma Raj; Naksha Shetty
- Cinematography: Girish
- Edited by: Crazy Mindz
- Music by: J. Anoop Seelin
- Production company: Krishna Talkies
- Release date: 10 May 2013
- Country: India
- Language: Kannada

Madarangi is a 2013 Indian Kannada-language romantic drama film directed by Mallikarjun Muthalageri, who previously directed Auto (2009), and starring Krishna, Sushma Raj and Naksha Shetty.

== Cast ==
- Krishna as Manu
- Sushma Raj
- Naksha Shetty as Deepu Real name Kavya Shekar shetty .
- Hanumathe Gowda as Somanna
- Sharath Lohitashwa as Shetty
- Avinash as Deepu's father
- Sadhu Kokila
- Vinaya Prasad
- Suchendra Prasad
- Kuri Prathap
- Chikkanna
- Adi Lokesh
- B. B. Ashok Kumar (cameo appearance)

== Soundtrack ==
The music was composed by J. Anoop Seelin. The song "Darling Darling" became popular before the film released. Arasu Anthare won the Karnataka State Film Award for Best Lyricist for the song "Male Haniye".

Track listing
No.	Title	Singer(s)	Length
1.	"Darling Darling"	J. Anoop Seelin, Varijashree Venugopal	3:51
2.	"Madarangi (title version)"	Sunitha Murali	4:30
3.	"Jee Yendavo"	Sunitha, Yash Golcha, Sirigowri, Mangala	3:17
4.	"Savira Savira"	Divya Raghavan	4:31
5.	"Kadle Puri"	J. Anoop Seelin	3:47
6.	"Malehaniye (female version)"	Anuradha Bhat	4:23

== Release and reception ==
The film released on the same day as Bulbul (2013) and ran for a hundred days. After this film, Krishna added Darling to his stage name.

A critic from Deccan Herald opined that "This “Madarangi” is a fragrant reminder of life's simple, and sometimes savage, pleasures". A critic from The Times of India wrote that "Director Mallikrajuna Muthalageri has selected a good story but does not impress either in script or narration".
