= Kousalya Supraja Rama (2023 film) =

2023 Kannada film

- Official theatrical poster
- Directed by: Shashank
- Written by: Yadunandan
- Produced by: Shashank; B. C. Patil
- Starring: Darling Krishna; Brinda Acharya; Milana Nagaraj
- Cinematography: Sugnaan
- Edited by: Giri Mahesh
- Music by: Arjun Janya
- Production companies: Kourava Production House; Shashank Cinemas
- Release date: 28 July 2023
- Running time: 147 minutes
- Country: India
- Language: Kannada

Kousalya Supraja Rama is a 2023 Kannada-language realistic drama film written by Yadunandan, directed by Shashank, who co-produced the film with B. C. Patil. The film stars Darling Krishna, Brinda Acharya and Milana Nagaraj in the lead roles.

Kousalya Supraja Rama was released on 28 July 2023, where it received positive reviews from critics and audiences. The film became a commercial success.

== Plot ==
Santhu and his in-laws are buying jewelry for their marriage when he gets a call that his cousin Rama is unconscious and has been hospitalized after his wife threw a glass bottle at him. When his father-in-law threatens to cancel the engagement, claiming the matter will bring dishonour to his family, Santhu challenges his narrow view of masculinity and narrates Rama's story.

As a child, Rama's father, Siddegowda, abuses his long-suffering mother, Kousalya, and instills toxic masculinity and chauvinistic values into him. As he grows up, he consistently chides and degrades women to maintain his macho image, but in college he meets and falls in love with a naive and shy fresher, Shivani. However, Rama tries to control her behavior and social life, culminating in an outburst where Shivani leaves him after he raises her hand against him. Rama refuses to apologize and drinks his sorrows away over several months. Santhu asks Kousalya to help him but Rama refuses to listen to her; Kousalya dies shortly after to his shock.

Upon going home for Kousalya's funeral, Rama is surprised to see Shivani participate in the burial rituals. She reveals that Kousalya met her to convince her to take him back, but she had challenged Kousalya, stating her husband and son had constantly suppressed her desires to enable their own recklessness. This spurs reflection in Rama of his view of masculinity, and he tries to ask Shivani for forgiveness and another chance; she reveals that she got engaged with another man. To fulfill Kousalya's wishes for once, Rama decides to wed Muthulakshmi, who Kousalya had wished to arrange his marriage to, without meeting her beforehand.

During the marriage ceremony, Santhu discovers that Muthulakshmi is an alcoholic and tries to stop the wedding to no avail. Rama reveals that he also found out but continued with the marriage. Muthulakshmi reverses the gender roles on Rama in ironic ways to Siddegowda's chagrin. She discloses that she started drinking after her parents forced her to go to medical school and her friend group, led by Nishan, encouraged her to drink in parties and to get over her fear of corpses, leading to her addiction and rustication from school. Her parents tried to marry her off to force her to change, but all their attempts failed until Rama agreed to marry her.

Rama, now supportive and less macho, blackmails the school into readmitting Muthulakshmi and cares for her as she studies and recovers, despite her rebukes of him and continued alcohol abuse. One night, Muthulakshmi leaves for a party with her old friends, and Rama follows along. She goads him by saying she had loved Nishan and wanted to divorce Rama. Rama finds that Nishan was mixing drugs in Muthulakshmi's drinks, causing her alcoholism. A scuffle ensues and a drunk Muthulakshmi, thinking that Rama was jealous, throws a glass bottle at Rama, knocking him out.

In the present, Santhu's father-in-law, inspired by Rama's change, agrees to continue with the marriage. Enraged about the attack, Siddegowda files a complaint against her. Meanwhile, Muthulakshmi finds out the truth the next morning, but Nishan encourages Muthulakshmi to file a counter complaint accusing Rama of abuse to save them from jail time. Muthulakshmi, however, rips up her complaint after realizing Rama's affection. Rama also withdraws Siddegowda's complaint, pointing out his father's similar abuse and saying that men should also care for and support the women in their lives. Rama offers Muthulakshmi a divorce, but she admits her love and askes for him back, which he agrees to. With Rama, Muthulakshmi and Siddegowda all having reformed, the family poses for a picture together on Rama's birthday, making space for Kousalya to be added in as the film ends.

== Cast ==
- Darling Krishna as Ram
- Brinda Acharya as Shivani, Ram's former love interest
- Milana Nagaraj as Muthulakshmi, Ram's wife
- Rangayana Raghu as Siddegowda, Ram's father
- Sudha Belawadi as Kousalya, Ram's mother
- Achyuth Kumar as Sathyanath
- Nagabhushana as Santhu

== Production ==
The film was announced by Darling Krishna and Shashank. The film is produced by Krishna. Brinda Acharya was cast as the lead opposite him. While Milana Nagaraj was cast as the other lead, marking their sixth onscreen pairing.

== Soundtrack ==
Kousalya Supraja Rama

Soundtrack album by Arjun Janya
- Released: 2023
- Genre: Feature film soundtrack
- Language: Kannada
- Label: Saregama India Limited

Track list
No.	Title	Lyrics	Singer (s)	Length
1.	"Shivani"	Shashank	Nishan Rai	4:01
2.	"Preethisuve"	Jayanth Kaikini	Sonu Nigam	4:09
3.	"90 Haaku"	Shashank	Aishwarya Rangarajan	2:54
4.	"Kousalya Supraja Rama"	Shashank	Prithwi Bhat, Pooja Rao	3:54
5.	"Marali Baa"	Shashank	Vijay Prakash	3:27
Total length:				18:41

== Release ==
The film was released on 28 July 2023. The movie ran for over 50 days in few theatres across Karnataka. The Digital rights of the movie was bagged by Amazon Prime and premiered on 15 September 2023. While the television premiere was on 7 October 2023 in Zee Kannada.

== Reception ==
Kousalya Supraja Rama received unanimously positive reviews from the critics, who lauded the writing, direction, performances and music in the cinema.

Harish Basavarajaiah of The Times of India wrote "the movie has the potential to cater to every class of audience, with a resonating message, which is emotionally connecting too." Y Maheswara Reddy of Bangalore Mirror wrote "All in all, Kousalya Supraja Rama is worth a watch by all, especially those who want to know the value of a mother."

Vivek M. V. of The Hindu wrote "Kousalya Supraja Rama is thoroughly watchable because the writing is mostly focused on the film’s central theme. An important subject has been dealt with sensitivity." A. Sharadhaa of The New Indian Express wrote "The cinema breaks away from the typical style, presenting a fresh and unique storyline. In an industry frequently criticised for promoting male chauvinism, the director takes a distinctive perspective by portraying the idea of a 'real man' from a woman’s viewpoint."

== Awards and nominations ==
Award	Date of ceremony	Category	Recipient	Result	Ref.
Filmfare Awards South	3 August 2024	Best Film – Kannada	Kousalya Supraja Rama	Nominated	
Filmfare Awards South	3 August 2024	Best Actress – Kannada	Milana Nagaraj	Nominated	
Filmfare Awards South	3 August 2024	Best Supporting Actor – Kannada	Nagabhushana	Nominated	
Filmfare Awards South	3 August 2024	Best Supporting Actress – Kannada	Sudha Belawadi	Won	
Filmfare Awards South	3 August 2024	Best Music Director – Kannada	Arjun Janya	Nominated	
Filmfare Awards South	3 August 2024	Best Lyricist – Kannada	Jayanth Kaikini (for "Preethisuve")	Nominated	
Filmfare Awards South	3 August 2024	Female Playback Singer – Kannada	Prithwi Bhat (for "Kousalya Supraja Rama")	Nominated	
South Indian International Movie Awards	14-15 September 2024	Best Film – Kannada	Kousalya Supraja Rama	Pending	
South Indian International Movie Awards	14-15 September 2024	Best Director – Kannada	Shashank	Pending	
