= Love Mocktail 3 =

2026 Indian film

- Theatrical release poster
- Directed by: Darling Krishna
- Written by: Darling Krishna; Milana Nagaraj; Yadunandan
- Produced by: Darling Krishna; Milana Nagaraj
- Starring: Darling Krishna; Milana Nagaraj; Samvrutha; Rachel David; Amrutha Iyengar
- Cinematography: Sri Crazy Mindz
- Edited by: Sri Crazy Mindz
- Music by: Nakul Abhyankar
- Production company: KrissMi Films
- Distributed by: KVN Productions
- Release date: 19 March 2026
- Running time: 134 minutes
- Country: India
- Language: Kannada

Love Mocktail 3 is a 2026 Indian Kannada‑language drama film directed by Darling Krishna and written by Darling Krishna, Milana Nagraj and Yadunandan. It serves as the third and final installment in the Love Mocktail film series. The film stars Darling Krishna, Milana Nagaraj, Samvrutha, Amrutha Iyengar, Dileep Raj, Amrutha Iyengar, Shwetha Prasad, and others. It is produced by Darling Krishna and Milana Nagaraj. The music was composed by Nakul Abhyankar.

The film was theatrically released on 19 March 2026.

== Plot ==
Set several years after the events of Love Mocktail 2, the film follows Adi, who is now a single father to Nidhi, the girl he adopted at the end of the previous film. Their life is built around simple routines, bedtime stories, school incidents, and the warmth of domestic stability, supported by their caretaker “Jagga Mummy” and frequent visits from Adi’s close friend Viju.

As the story unfolds, an unexpected claim emerges when an elderly woman, Dr. Shanta, asserts that Nidhi is her biological granddaughter. This sparks an emotionally intense custody battle, pushing Adi to confront unresolved parts of his past while trying to keep the daughter he deeply loves. Legal and emotional challenges follow, testing the limits of Adi’s resilience and the strength of their father‑daughter bond. The film continues the franchise’s themes of healing, responsibility, and emotional connection. The climax settles with a happily ever after where father and daughter are reunited.

== Cast ==
- Darling Krishna as Aditya "Adi"
- Milana Nagaraj as Nidhima "Nidhi"
- Samvrutha Sunil as Nidhi
- Rachel David as Sihi
- Amrutha Iyengar as Joshitha "Jo"
- Abhilash Dalapathi as Viju
- Jagadish as Jagadish/Jagga Mummy
- Sushmita Gowda
- Rajani Bharadwaj as Rajini Teacher
- Rekha Kudligi as Dr. Shanta
- Dileep Raj as Advocate Sanjay
- Shwetha R Prasad as Advocate Leela
- Vaishali Deepak/Neyaara Deepak as Shruthi
- Nakul Abhyankar as Nakul
- B. M. Giriraj as Judge Gireesh

== Production ==
=== Development ===
Following the success of Love Mocktail (2020) and Love Mocktail 2 (2022), Darling Krishna conceived the third chapter as an exploration of fatherhood, family, and emotional evolution rather than conventional romance. The story was co‑written by Darling Krishna, Milana Nagaraj, and Yadunandan.

=== Casting ===
Most of the key cast from the second film returned, including Darling Krishna and Milana Nagaraj. Child actor Samvrutha joined as Nidhi. The supporting cast includes frequent collaborators like Amrutha Iyengar, Dileep Raj, and Shwetha Prasad.

== Music ==
The soundtrack album consists of four singles composed by Nakul Abhyankar with lyrics written by Raghavendra Kamath, Arun Naik and Shashank.

Track listing
No.	Title	Lyrics	Singer(s)	Length
1.	"Neene Neenene Nannella Aase"	Shashank	Nakul Abhyankar	3:37
2.	"Obbantiyaade Naa"	Raghavendra Kamath	Nakul Abhayankar, Keerthan Holla	4:48
3.	"Beladingalu"	Raghavendra Kamath	Vijay Prakash	3:26
4.	"Muddu Magale"	Arun Naik	Vijay Prakash	3:28

== Controversies ==
In March 2026, Love Mocktail 3 became embroiled in a plagiarism dispute after filmmaker Guru Deshpande and writer Raghavendra M. Naik publicly alleged that the film’s post‑intermission portions particularly, the custody battle and courtroom proceedings involving an adopted child, were lifted from a script they had previously narrated to Darling Krishna. They claimed that Krishna had heard their story during a narration meeting in August 2023 and later incorporated its core elements into Love Mocktail 3 without credit. Deshpande asserted that while the film was presented as a continuation of the franchise, its second half mirrored the central conflict and narrative turn of their script.

Darling Krishna denied the allegations, stating that Love Mocktail 3 had been developed over several years as a direct continuation of Love Mocktail 2, whose climax already established the adoption arc. He argued that the similarities cited were generic to stories about adoption and custody disputes and maintained that the opposing script was based on a separate, real‑life incident. Calling the accusations defamatory, Krishna announced his intention to file a defamation case against Guru Deshpande and Raghavendra Naik, asserting that the claims harmed his reputation and the film’s standing.
