= Premam Poojyam =

2021 Indian Kannada romantic film

- Theatrical release poster
- Directed by: Dr Raghavendra B S
- Written by: Dr Raghavendra B S
- Story by: Dr Raghavendra B S
- Produced by: Dr Raghavendra B S Dr. Rakshith Kedambadi; Dr. Rajkumar Janakiraman; Manoj Krishnan
- Starring: Prem; Brinda Acharya; Aindrita Ray
- Cinematography: I. Naveen Kumar
- Edited by: Harish Komme
- Music by: Dr Raghavendra B S
- Production company: Kedambadi Creations
- Release date: November 12, 2021
- Running time: 163 minutes
- Country: India
- Language: Kannada

Premam Poojyam is a 2021 Indian Kannada romantic film written, directed, and co-produced by Dr. Raghavendra B S, making his debut. The film is being produced by Dr. Rakshith Kedambadi, Dr. Rajkumar Janakiraman, Dr. Raghavendra S, Manoj Krishnan under the banner Kedambadi Creations. It features Prem and Brinda Acharya along with Aindrita Ray in the lead roles. The supporting cast includes Master Anand, Anu Prabhakar and Avinash. The score and soundtrack for the film is by Dr. Raghavendra BS and the cinematography is by Naveen Kumar. The film received a positive response from both public and critics and it was declared as a hit at the box office.

== Cast ==
- Prem as Dr Srihari
- Brinda Acharya as Angel
- Aindrita Ray as Joyitha
- Master Anand
- Anu Prabhakar
- Avinash
- Dr.Deepthi
- Sadhu Kokila
- Suman
- T S Nagabharana

== Production ==
The film marked actor Prem's 25th film in his film career. The film had newbie Brinda Acharya and Aindrita Ray as the female leads. The film was shot in Bengaluru, Mysuru, and in other parts of Karnataka. The trailer of the film was released on 14 October 2021.

== Release ==
The film was earlier slated to release on 29 October 2021 but to avoid the clash with Bhajarangi 2. The film was later slated to release on 12 November 2021.

== Soundtrack ==
Premam Poojyam

Soundtrack album by Dr. Raghavendra BS
- Released: 11 November 2021
- Genre: Feature film soundtrack
- Length: 54:13
- Language: Kannada
- Label: Kedambi Audio
- Producer: Dr. Raghavendra B. S.

The film's background score and the soundtracks are composed, written and sung by Dr Raghavendra B S . The music rights were acquired by Kedambi Audio.

All lyrics are written by Dr. Raghavendra B. S.

Tracklist
No.	Title	Singer(s)	Length
1.	"Premam Poojyam (Title Track)"	Hariharan	4:12
2.	"Ambaari Prema"	Armaan Malik, Mridula Warrier	6:27
3.	"Vaidyo Narayana Harihi"	Vijay Prakash	4:54
4.	"Amara Madhura"	Vihaan Arya, Anuradha Bhat	5:07
5.	"Sneham Poojyam"	Sadhu Kokila	2:18
6.	"Eredu Dashakada Nantara"	Dr. Sandeep M. B	1:40
7.	"Ninnanu Bittu Naa Hegirali (Male)"	Shahabaz Aman	6:18
8.	"Ninna Kanna Anchina"	Vihaan Arya	2:29
9.	"O Baana Modagale"	Mohit Chauhan	4:21
10.	"Lovely Star Revisited"	Dr. Sandeep M. B.	1:28
11.	"Hariya Preeth"	Mohit Chauhan	2:10
12.	"Sneham Poojyam (Friendship Revisited)"	Dr. Sandeep M. B.	2:34
13.	"Ninnanu Bittu Naa Hegirali (Female)"	Dr. Smrithi Shetty	1:56
14.	"Ambaari Prema"	Armaan Malik	6:31
15.	"Strings of Heart & It's Eternal Wait"	Prem	1:00
16.	"Whistle of Love"		0:44
