= Marigold (2024 film) =

- Theatrical release poster
- Directed by: Raghavendra Naik
- Written by: Raghu Niduvalli (dialogues)
- Screenplay by: Raghavendra Naik
- Story by: Raghavendra Naik
- Produced by: Raghuvardhan
- Starring: Diganth Manchale; Sangeetha Sringeri; Yash Shetty; Cockroach Sudhi; Sampath Maitreya
- Cinematography: K. S. Chandrasekar
- Edited by: K. M. Prakash
- Music by: Veer Samarth
- Production company: R.V. Creations
- Release date: 5 April 2024
- Country: India
- Language: Kannada

Marigold (transl. Selling gold) is a 2024 Indian Kannada-language crime thriller film directed by Raghavendra Naik and starring Diganth Manchale, Sangeetha Sringeri, Yash Shetty, Cockroach Sudhi and Sampath Maitreya.

The film was released on 5 April 2024 to positive reviews.

== Cast ==
- Diganth Manchale as Krishna
- Sangeetha Sringeri as Sonu
- Yash Shetty as Gilki
- Cockroach Sudhi as Sudhi
- Sampath Maitreya as Police Constable
- Vajrang Shetty
- Bala Rajwadi as Police Inspector
- Mahantesh Hiremath as Krishna's follower in jail
- Sundeep Malani

== Production ==
The film began production in 2020.

== Music ==
The film has songs composed by Veer Samarth.

Track listing
No.	Title	Lyrics	Singer(s)	Length
1.	"I Am The King"	Rohith Hallikhed, Kaviraj	Veer Samarth, Rohith Hallikhed	2:47
2.	"Sihi Jena Male"	Yogaraj Bhat	Anuradha Bhat	4:15
3.	"Marigold Theme"	—	—	1:49
Total length:				8:51

== Reception ==
A critic from The Times of India rated the film three out of five stars and wrote that "Marigold is a thrilling ride with a meaningful lesson, perfect for a night out at the movies". A Sharadhaa from Cinema Express rated the film three out of five stars and wrote that "Marigold could appeal to those who enjoy films with a mix of comedy, suspense, and thrills. Its dialogues, engaging narrative, good performances, and the opportunity to see Diganth in a new light make it a worthy watch for viewers seeking a fresh experience". A critic from Times Now rated the film three out of five stars and wrote that "Is money the only solution for all our needs? Watch Marigold to know the answer -- especially, if you are a Diganth fan!".
