= Mumbai (film) =

2017 Indian film

- Theatrical release poster
- Directed by: S. R. Ramesh
- Produced by: Ramu
- Starring: Krishna; Teju
- Music by: Sridhar Sambram
- Production company: Ramu International
- Release date: 26 January 2017
- Country: India
- Language: Kannada

Mumbai is a 2017 Indian Kannada-language film directed by S. R. Ramesh and starring Krishna and Teju. The film follows a cashier who becomes a gangster in Mumbai.

== Cast ==
- Krishna
- Teju as Aishu
- Rangayana Raghu
- Kaddipudi Chandru
- Bullet Prakash
- Ashish Vidhyarthi
- Kote Prabhakar

== Production ==
Teju, who previously starred in Chingari (2012), made her lead debut with this film. The film finished shooting in November of 2016.

== Soundtrack ==
The music was composed by Sridhar Sambram.

Song	Singer(s)
"Dasavalad Hoova"	Puneeth Rajkumar
"Lovvingu Hudugiru"	Vijay Prakash
"Bombay Mitai"	Shashank, Sunitha
"Mumbai Theme Music"	Instrumental
"Nanna Mana Palayana"	Santhosh Venky, Anuradha Bhat
"Ajanabi Shehar"	Ankita Kundu, Santhosh Venky
"Yarali Kelali"	Ankita Kundu, Santhosh Venky

== Reception ==
A critic from Bangalore Mirror wrote that "Mumbai is a film made without inspiration and does not leave a good impression". A critic from The New Indian Express wrote that "The film is not for those who are looking for a heartwarming tale, but for audiences who are excited by a hero who gets a slow build up and demands undivided attention when he is in full swing". A critic from The Times of India wrote that "Watch Mumbai if you like your dose of old school commercial cinema, but be warned that the film seems rather long and can test your patience".
