= Jaali Baaru Mattu Poli Hudugaru =

- Poster
- Directed by: Sreedhar
- Written by: Krish Joshi
- Starring: Krishna; Manasi Vasudeva
- Cinematography: KM Vishnuvrdhana
- Music by: Veer Samarth
- Release date: 3 November 2017
- Country: India
- Language: Kannada

Jaali Baaru Mattu Poli Hudugaru is a 2017 Indian Kannada-language romantic comedy film directed by Sreedhar and starring Krishna and Manasi Vasudeva. The film's title is based on a poem by BR Lakshman Rao.

== Cast ==
- Krishna as Santhu
- Manasi Vasudeva
- Chikkanna
- Jahangir
- Kalyani
- Sanketh Kashi
- Veena Sundar
- Mico Nagaraj

== Reception ==
A critic from The Times of India wrote that "Blotchy screenplay makes a talented cast seem out of place in a rather underwhelming narrative". A critic from Bangalore Mirror wrote that "Connoisseurs will be heartbroken by what this film does to the collective imagination of the bar Kannadigas have developed".
