= India Pakistan =

2015 Indian film by N. Anand

- Poster
- Directed by: N. Anand
- Written by: N. Anand
- Produced by: Fatima Vijay Antony
- Starring: Vijay Antony; Sushma Raj; Pasupathy
- Cinematography: N. Om
- Edited by: M. Thiyagarajan
- Music by: Deena Devrajan
- Production company: Vijay Antony Film Corporation
- Distributed by: Sri Green Productions
- Release date: 8 May 2015
- Running time: 169 minutes
- Country: India
- Language: Tamil

India Pakistan is a 2015 Indian Tamil-language romantic comedy film written and directed by N. Anand. It stars Vijay Antony and Sushma Raj, while Pasupathy plays a pivotal supporting role. The film, produced by Vijay Antony himself, was filmed by N. Om, director Anand's younger brother and features music scored by Deena Devarajan, Antony's former associate. India Pakistan released on 8 May 2015 to mixed to positive reviews from critics and audience and ended up with a successful venture at the box office.

== Plot ==
India Pakistan is a story of how two young advocates Karthik and Melina counter many fights and fun together. Living in rented rooms in the same building, they lock up each other, fight, hide in each other's study, and sneak out of each other's cases, trying to prove they are a better advocate than the other. They travel from place to place, regarding a village dispute case. In the end, Melina decides to encounter the villain for the sake of two young lovers of the village. Karthik and his friends save her by playing a tactful game with the villain, who claims a DVD in which an encounter is shot. Karthik, Melina, and the others solve the mystery and unite when they confess their love for each other.

== Cast ==
- Vijay Antony as Adv. Karthik
- Sushma Raj as Adv. Mellina
- Jagan as Haridass (Pavada)
- Pasupathy as Kaattamuthu
- M. S. Bhaskar as Marudhamuthu
- Urvashi as Karthik's mother (Cameo)
- Shiny as Seetha
- Pandi as Dheena
- Manobala as Idichapuli
- Kaali Venkat as Selvam
- Yogi Babu as Aamai Kunju
- Sharath Lohitashwa as Inspector Sampath
- T. P. Gajendran as Judge
- Sankara Narayanan as Melina's father
- Manikandan as Saravanan
- Seema
- Munish Raja
- Ravikanth
- Pei Krishnan
- Thavasi Thevar
- Elango
- Maayi Sundar
- Lollu Sabha Seshu as Kaattamuthu's sidekick
- Munnar Ramesh as Antony
- Satheesh Kumar Sundaram

== Production ==
The film was announced by Vijay Antony in September 2013, when he revealed that he would work on the project alongside his commitment to another venture, Thirudan. Production works began soon after, though Vijay Antony concentrated on the release of his other production Salim (2014), before beginning his portions. Filming began in April 2014 and was shot straight for sixty days.

== Release ==
The satellite rights of the film were sold to Zee Tamil.

== Soundtrack ==
The soundtrack of the film is composed by Deena Devrajan. This marks the first Vijay Antony film to have a different music composer.

No.	Title	Singer(s)	Length
1.	"Vadi Kutti Lady"	Nivas, Anitha	3:43
2.	"Pala Kodi Pengalilay"	Hemachandra, Nivas, Vandana Srinivasan	3:46
3.	"Oru Ponna PartheinMama"	S. P. B. Charan	3:54
4.	"Naan Unnai Dhinamum Ninaikiren"	Abhay Jodhpurkar, Swetha Mohan	4:06
5.	"India Naan Pakistan Nee"	MC Vicky, Yazin Nizar, Santosh Hariharan	3:07

== Critical reception ==
The Hindu's Baradwaj Rangan wrote, " India Pakistan is one of those not-so-bad films, thanks to solid contributions by M.S. Baskar...and Manobala...I wished we’d seen more of them and less of the lazy comedy track written around Jagan. N. Anand has a knack for the absurd. I’d be interested in watching a pure comedy by him — but please, nothing more than a couple of hours". The Times of India gave the film 2.5 stars out of 5 and wrote, " India Pakistan is the kind of film that you might not feel compelled to watch, but if you do catch it, you might not mind it. It is unremarkable in every way with its share of problems but still manages to be a mildly diverting entertainer". The New Indian Express wrote, "Stronger in content than style, India Pakistan, is ideal summer fare. It strikes the right chord for the most part and is one of the better comic capers to appear in recent times".

Sify wrote, "Director Anand has made India Pakistan in such a way that the film is highly entertaining and it happens mainly because of the characterization and dialogue deliveries of both MS Baskar and Pasupathy who rocks big time", going on to label it "a pucca commercial comedy entertainer which is tailor-made for family audiences". Bangalore Mirror wrote, "The film is indeed a breezily funny rom-com and the first time filmmaker has served it plateful, most of the scenes being enjoyable most of the time", rating it 3 out of 5.
