= Milana Nagaraj =

Indian actress

- Born: 25 April; Hassan, Karnataka, India
- Education: Vivekananda Institute of Technology, Bengaluru
- Occupations: Actress; producer
- Years active: 2013–present
- Spouse: Krishna (m. 2021)
- Children: 1

Milana Nagaraj (born 25 April) is an Indian actress who primarily works in Kannada films. Considered as one of the leading actresses in Kannada cinema, Milana is a recipient of several accolades including a Karnataka State Film Award, a Filmfare Awards South and two SIIMA Awards.

Milana made her acting debut with Nam Duniya Nam Style (2013). The same year, she received Filmfare Award for Best Supporting Actress – Kannada nomination, for her performance in Brindavana. Post a series of failures, Milana received acclaim for her portrayal of Nidhi in Love Mocktail (2020) and its sequel Love Mocktail 2 (2022), both of which were commercial successes. For the former, she won the Filmfare Critics Award for Best Actress – Kannada and SIIMA Award for Best Actress – Kannada. Further success came with Kousalya Supraja Rama (2023) and Love Mocktail 3 (2026).

Milana is married to her co-actor Darling Krishna, with whom she has a daughter.

== Early life and work ==
Milana was born in Hassan, Karnataka. She completed her schooling in Hassan. She completed her BE in computer science from Vivekananda Institute of Technology, Bengaluru and is a computer engineer. She was a state-level backstroke swimmer, before she started modelling.

Milana started her career as a model and participated in Femina Miss Karnataka, where she won "Miss Best Personality". She then ventured into acting.

== Career ==
=== Early work and struggle (2013-2019) ===
Milana made her screen debut with the 2013 film Nam Duniya Nam Style opposite Likith Shetty. A Times of India critic noted, "Milana excels with good expressions and dialogue delivery." In the same year, she portrayed Madhu, a college student opposite Darshan in Brindavana, a remake of Telugu film Brindavanam. Several critics stated that Milana "impresses" with her expressions. She received a nomination for Filmfare Award for Best Supporting Actress – Kannada. It was a box office success. In 2015, she portrayed Purvi in Charlie, opposite Krishna.

Milana had two film releases in 2017. She first made her Malayalam film debut with Avarude Raavukal opposite Vinay Forrt. Cris from Deccan Chronicle stated, "Milana has done a neat job but seems like an afterthought." Milana next portrayed Aishwarya, a politician's daughter in Jani opposite Vijay Raghavendra. A critic of Vijaya Karnataka stated that Milana has "bare minimum to do".

=== Success and critical acclaim (2020-2022) ===
Following a three year hiatus, Milana made her comeback to films with the 2020 film Love Mocktail. She portrayed Nidhima, software employee opposite Krishna, which she also co-produces. A Shraddha from The New Indian Express stated, "A unique role for Milana, she shows maturity in her acting." Aravind Shwetha of The News Minute noted, "Milana has a refreshing character and plays her part well. She must continue to pick roles that bring the best out of her." A major commercial success, it emerged as the fourth highest grossing Kannada film of the year. The same year, she portrayed Spandana in Matte Udbhava opposite Panju. Times of India mentioned that "Milana Nagaraj chips in with a good performance." Love Mocktail won her the Filmfare Critics Award for Best Actress – Kannada and she received her first Filmfare Award for Best Actress – Kannada nomination.

Milana further had three film releases in 2022 – She first reprised Nidhima in the sequel Love Mocktail 2, opposite Krishna. Vivek M V called her the "soul of the franchise" and noted, "Milana's effort is a fine mix of understanding the character and bringing new layers to it." Sunayana Suresh stated, "Milana looks ethereal in the film and adds a lot of entertainment." It was a box office success and emerged as the seventh highest grossing Kannada film of the year. Following this, she played Renu, a detective's wife opposite Sudeepa in Vikrant Rona. A Bollywood Hungama critic was appreciative of hercameo role. It became one of the highest grossing Kannada film of all time. She then portrayed Nikitha alongside Amrutha Iyengar in O. A Sharadhaa stated, "Milana get to experiment with fresh characterisation and gives a strong performance." It was a box office average.

=== Career progression (2023-present) ===
In 2023, Milana first portrayed Pallavi opposite Krishna in Mr. Bachelor. Vinay Lokesh stated that she proves her mettle with a "decent screen presence". She next portrayed a fashion designer in Love Birds opposite Krishna. A critic from The New Indian Express stated that she gave a "natural and poignant performance". In her last release of the year, Milana portrayed an alcoholic in Kousalya Supraja Rama, reuniting with Krishna. The Hindu critic noted, "Milana's portrayal of a drunkard is a tad over the top, but she performs with superb restraint in serious portions." Her performance earned her another nomination for Filmfare Best Actress – Kannada. Mr. Bachelor and Love Birds failed at the box office but Kousalya Supraja Rama emerged a box office success and the eighth highest grossing film of the year.

In her first release of 2024, Milana played a secretly married woman in For Regn opposite Pruthvi Ambaar. Vivek M. V. noted, "Milana is natural in emotional sequences and the actors [Milana and Ambaar] do more for the film than what the film does for them." Following this, she played a school teacher in Aaraam Arvind Swamy opposite Aniish. Suhasini B Srihari of Deccan Herald was appreciative of her "credible performance". Both films emerged as box office averages.

Milana reprised Nidhi opposite Krishna, in the 2026 film Love Mocktail 3. A Sharadhaa felt her brief appearance acts as "emotional bridge", tying Aadi’s present to his past. A commercial success, it became the fourth highest-grossing Kannada film of the year and the highest-grossing film of the franchise.

== Personal life ==
Milana met actor Krishna, on the sets of the 2013 film Nam Duniya Nam Style. They eventually started dating in 2015. Milana married Krishna on 14 February 2021, in a private traditional ceremony on the outskirts of Bengaluru. On 5 September 2024, she gave birth to their daughter Pari.

== In the media ==
Writing for Film Companion, film journalist Sonu Venugopal opined: "Milana Nagaraj has starred in many rom-coms in her career and has ushered in a new brand of such films in Kannada cinema. Milana would certainly be the perfect actor for a monicker in the rom-com genre, if there was." Vivek M.V. of The Hindu noted, "Even in her weaker films, Milana stood out thanks to her charming presence and effortless portrayal of her characters."

Milana was placed 17th in 2013 and 14th in 2020, in the Bangalore Times' Most Desirable Women list. In 2023, News18 placed her 3rd in its "Top Kannada Actresses" list and noted, "Her on-screen charisma and stellar performance worked wonders in Kousalya Supraja Rama. Milana is one of the most followed Kannada actress on Instagram.

== Filmography ==
=== Films ===
Key
†	Denotes films that have not yet been released

- All films are in Kannada unless otherwise noted.

Year	Title	Role	Notes	Ref.
2013	Nam Duniya Nam Style	Milana		
2013	Brindavana	Madhu		
2015	Charlie	Purvi		
2017	Avarude Raavukal	Meghna	Malayalam film	
2017	Jani	Aishwarya		
2020	Love Mocktail	Nidhima "Nidhi"		
2020	Matte Udbhava	Spandana		
2022	Love Mocktail 2	Nidhima "Nidhi"		
2022	Vikrant Rona	Renu Rona	Cameo appearance	
2022	O	Nikitha		
2023	Mr. Bachelor	Pallavi		
2023	Love Birds	Pooja		
2023	Kousalya Supraja Rama	Mutthulakshmi "Mutthu"		
2024	For Regn	Anvita "Anvi"		
2024	Aaraam Arvind Swamy	Geetha		
2026	Love Mocktail 3	Nidhima "Nidhi"		
TBA	Bella †	TBA	Filming	

=== Other crew positions ===
Year	Title	Role	Ref.
2020	Love Mocktail	Producer	
2022	Love Mocktail 2	Producer	
2026	Love Mocktail 3	Producer and co-writer	

== Accolades ==
Year	Award	Category	Film	Result	Ref
2014	Filmfare Awards South	Best Supporting Actress – Kannada	Brindavana	Nominated	
2021	Chandanavana Film Critics Academy Awards	Best Film	Love Mocktail	Nominated	
2021	Chandanavana Film Critics Academy Awards	Best Actress	Love Mocktail	Nominated	
2021	South Indian International Movie Awards	Best Film – Kannada	Love Mocktail	Won	
2021	South Indian International Movie Awards	Best Actress – Kannada	Love Mocktail	Won	
2022	Filmfare Awards South	Best Actress – Kannada	Love Mocktail	Nominated	
2022	Filmfare Awards South	Best Actress Critics – Kannada	Love Mocktail	Won	
2022	Chittara Star Awards	Rising Star	Love Mocktail	Won	
2023	South Indian International Movie Awards	Best Film – Kannada	Love Mocktail 2	Nominated	
2024	Chandanavana Film Critics Academy Awards	Best Actress	Kousalya Supraja Rama	Nominated	
2024	Filmfare Awards South	Best Actress – Kannada	Kousalya Supraja Rama	Nominated	
2024	Chittara Star Awards	Best Actress	Kousalya Supraja Rama	Nominated	
2025	Karnataka State Film Awards	Second Best Film	Love Mocktail	Won	
2025	Chittara Star Awards	Best Actress	Aaraam Arvind Swamy	Nominated	

== See also ==
- List of Kannada film actresses
