= Chaddi Dosth =

- Official poster
- Directed by: PC Shekhar
- Written by: Nataraj (dialogues)
- Produced by: Shyam
- Starring: Rangayana Raghu; Sadhu Kokila
- Cinematography: Kumaran
- Music by: Arjun Janya
- Release date: 29 November 2013
- Country: India
- Language: Kannada

Chaddi Dosth (transl. Childhood friends) is a 2013 Indian Kannada-language comedy film directed by PC Shekhar and starring Rangayana Raghu and Sadhu Kokila.

== Cast ==
- Rangayana Raghu as Ranganna
- Sadhu Kokila as Khadim
- Roopa Shree as Sandhya
- Ashwini Gowda
- Avinash as Venkateswhara
- Mimicry Dayanand

== Soundtrack ==
The music is composed by Arjun Janya.

- "Love Ondsari"
- "Rodige Taaru"
- "Chaddi Dosth"

== Reception ==
A critic from The Times of India wrote that "Though the first half is okay, the second half is too noisy with an overdose of loud dialoguesm". A critic from Sify wrote that "The movie scores huge bonus points from the audiences for being the perfect laughter riot. A perfect weekend treat and a must watch movie". A critic from Indiaglitz wrote that "This is a film for the masses".
