= Kadhale En Kadhale =

- Directed by: PC Shekhar
- Written by: PC Shekhar
- Produced by: P. Marikumar; P. Ramesh Kumar; P. Kumar; S. Rajendranath
- Starring: Naveen; Shrutha Keerthi; Roma Asrani
- Cinematography: Vaidy S
- Edited by: Suresh Urs
- Music by: Prayog
- Production company: CRM Productions
- Release date: 4 August 2006
- Running time: 135 minutes
- Country: India
- Language: Tamil

Kadhale En Kadhale (transl. Love My Love) is a 2006 Tamil-language romance film directed by PC Shekhar, making his directorial debut. The film stars newcomers Naveen, Shrutha Keerthi and Roma Asrani, with Ramakrishna, Chitra Shenoy, Avinash, newcomer Raviraj, Vijayalakshmi, and Jiju playing supporting roles. The music was performed by Prayog with cinematography by Vaidy S and editing by Suresh Urs. The film released on 4 August 2006 and fared poorly at the box office. However, the film won the Tamil Nadu State Film Award for Best Film Portraying Woman in Good Light.

== Plot ==
Rajiv is a final-year student and also the son of a rich couple. His family friend's daughter Krithika, a shy girl, comes to stay in their house. She joins the same school as him as a first-year student. Rajiv helps her in many ways. At the college admission day, Rajiv falls under the spell of the fresher Pragathi. Krithika later leaves their home and moves to the college hostel. One day, Krithika falls sick and Rajiv takes care of her; therefore, she falls in love with him. Every day, Krithika records her love for Rajiv in a journal in her computer, whereas Rajiv is attracted by Pragathi's friendly approach, speech, and graceful look. However, Rajiv does not have the courage to convey his love to Pragathi. On the final day of college, Rajiv reveals to Krithika that he is in love with her classmate Pragathi, Krithika is therefore heartbroken. Rajiv then proposes his love to Pragathi, but she does not reciprocate his love and humiliates him.

Rajiv later finds a job and has to go to Singapore, but he does want to leave his native place. Krithika then encourages him to go; captivated by her gentle words, he moves there. After his return to the homeland, his company gives Rajiv a promotion for his work and wants to send him to the United States for a two-year project. His parents compel him to marry before he left for the US, but he categorically refuses. His parents then force him to see a bride; she is none other than his ex-lover Pragathi, and he refuses to marry her. One day, Pragathi meets Rajiv and apologizes for humiliating him when he proposed his love. She tells him that she has changed a lot since the suicide of her best friend Shalini.

Rajiv then decides to marry Pragathi. Their engagement goes as planned. Krithika, who seems to be happy on the outside, is, in fact, suffering on the inside. Thereafter, Krithika's father compels her daughter to get married but she could not forget Rajiv. Later, Rajiv tries to convince his well-wisher Krithika to get married, but to Rajiv's surprise, Pragathi reveals that Krithika is in love with Rajiv and was too shy to reveal her love. The film ends with Pragathi sacrificing her love.

== Cast ==
- Naveen as Rajiv
- Shrutha Keerthi as Pragathi
- Roma Asrani as Krithika
- Ramakrishna as Rajiv's father
- Chitra Shenoy as Saradha, Rajiv's mother
- Avinash as Mahendran, Pragathi's father
- Raviraj as Sundaram, Krithika's father
- Vijayalakshmi as Shalini
- Jiju as Jiju
- Sathish
- K. Ajay
- Shankar
- Sonia
- Baby Deepika as Deepika

== Production ==
Bangalore-based Naveen made his acting debut through this film. He previously worked with PC Shekhar in his short films. Most of the actors except for Roma Asrani were from Karnataka. The film's title is based on the opening lyric of the song "En Kadhale" from Duet (1994).

== Soundtrack ==
Kadhale En Kadhale

Soundtrack album by Prayog
- Released: 2006
- Recorded: 2005
- Genre: Feature film soundtrack
- Length: 23:17
- Producer: Prayog

The film score and the soundtrack were composed by Prayog. The soundtrack, released in 2006, features 6 tracks with lyrics written by Na. Muthukumar.

Track	Song	Singer(s)	Duration
1	"Haiyaiyo"	Ranjith, Timmy, Prayog	
2	"Maya"	Bhavatharini	
3	"Ulakame"	Srinivas	
4	"Kannodu Kaanum"	Harini, Ganga	
5	"Kattili"	Harish Raghavendra	
6	"Kangal"	Karthik	

== Reception ==
Sify stated, "The film looks more like a play than a candy floss romance as it is told at leisurely pace that induces sleep. The script is too silly and lead actors have miles to go as far as acting goes". A critic from CineSouth wrote that "Debut making director has made a beautiful, refined love story without resorting to titillations and lusty overtones. While expressing appreciation for his good efforts, some things have to be pointed out too".
