= Romeo (2012 film) =

- DVD Cover
- Directed by: PC Shekhar
- Screenplay by: P. C. Shekhar
- Story by: P. C. Shekhar
- Produced by: Naveen; Ramesh Kumar
- Starring: Ganesh; Bhavana; Avinash
- Cinematography: Vaidy S
- Edited by: A. Saravanan
- Music by: Arjun Janya
- Production company: KS Pictures
- Distributed by: Jayanna Films
- Release date: 6 July 2012
- Country: India
- Language: Kannada

Romeo is a 2012 Indian Kannada-language romantic comedy film written and directed by PC Shekhar, starring Ganesh and Bhavana in the lead roles. Naveen and Ramesh Kumar are the producers of this romantic love story film.

Arjun Janya composed the music, and Vaidhi handled the camera work. The film was released across Karnataka state on 6 July 2012.

== Plot ==
Ganesh began his life by peeing on the face of his father, Kashinath. Despite being mischievous, he manages to reach the graduation level, but with poor English-speaking skills. He gets a job in a bank where he meets Shruti and Panda.

As expected, their love blossoms after a series of comic scenes. Ganesh, a slum dweller and street smart, impresses Shruti by telling a pack of lies, where he went on to claim that he was born with a silver spoon and he is the son of a millionaire, but living an ordinary life to learn the basic lessons of life. The couple marries secretly when her father opposes their marriage and arranges a secret marriage with a rich man. However, soon Shruti realises that she was lied to and cheated, and she leaves Ganesh and applies for a divorce. Though Ganesh is unwilling to divorce her, he requests a divorce in court after six months of court fighting. After the divorce, he realised the importance of life, the love of his parents, and he suddenly rose in life like a phoenix. He works hard, earns some money, and changes his home. After a year of divorce, he meets Shruti again, and he wants to get her back. As she was in a training period of one week in Ganesh's friend's office, she was on her way back to the US, where she had been residing since the divorce. Ganesh learns this and fakes an accident, which lures Shruti to return from the airport to the hospital to see Ganesh. Then she discovers Kashinath's plan, who was trying to reunite Ganesh and Shruti. The film ends with the couple's reunion.

== Cast ==
- Ganesh as Ganesh
- Bhavana as Shruti
- Avinash
- Sudha Belawadi as Vijayamma
- Ramesh Bhat as Ramesh
- Rangayana Raghu as Kashinath
- Sadhu Kokila as Pandu
- Mithra
- Taranga Vishwa
- Renuka Prasad
- Girish Shivanna
- Shanthamma as Kashinath's mother
- Nagendra Shah
- M. K. Mata
- Mimicry Dayanand
- Laya Kokila
- Charna
- Shille Manjunath
- Rockline Sudhakar
- Tanisha Kuppanda

== Music ==
Romeo

Soundtrack album by Arjun Janya
- Released: 18 June 2012
- Recorded: 2012
- Genre: Feature film soundtrack
- Length: 28:04
- Language: Kannada

Official audio
- Romeo - Full Album on YouTube

Track listing
No.	Title	Lyrics	Singer(s)	Length
1.	"Aalochane"	Kaviraj	Shreya Ghoshal	5:00
2.	"Romeo Romeo"	V. Nagendra Prasad	Arjun Janya	4:19
3.	"Smile Vasi"	Ghouse Peer	Arjun Janya	4:11
4.	"Tunturu Tunturu"	Santhu	Karthik	4:41
5.	"Everybody Rock"	V. Nagendra Prasad	Vijay Prakash, Priya Himesh	4:21
6.	"By-2 Bedsheetali"	Yogaraj Bhat	Shamitha Malnad, Suma Shastry	3:05
7.	"Belagageddu Coffee"	Santhu	Ganesh, Arjun Janya, Sadhu Kokila, Rangayana Raghu	3:07
Total length:				28:04

== Box office ==
Romeo was a much-anticipated film and got a good opening at the box office, due to superhit songs and the youth fan following of the film's lead actor Ganesh. The film met with a positive response upon release, and it went on to be commercially successful at the box office by completing a 100-day run.

== Reception ==
=== Critical response ===
A critic from The Times of India scored the film at 3.5 out of 5 stars and says "The first half is lively with catchy dialogues that keep you in good humour till the end. You don’t feel bored even during the sentimental sequences that occupy most part of the second half. It would have been better if the second half was trimmed by at least 15 minutes". A critic from News18 India wrote "Arjun Janya's music compositions are quite good. Shreya Ghoshal's rendering of 'Alochane' song is sure to top the charts. Vaidhi's camera work is stylish. Watch 'Romeo' despite some of its flaws. It is entertaining and engaging". A critic from Rediff.com scored the film at 2.5 out of 5 stars and wrote "The first half is hilarious, but the second half is a bit slow and has only one song to give you the musical zing. Arjun Janya has scored some good songs. Shreya Ghoshal's Alochane is a soft and lilting number". A critic from The New Indian Express wrote "Somewhere, Ganesh’s romantic touch is also missed. Avinash, Rangayana Raghu and Sadhu Kokila have done a good job with their witty act. Dialogues by Natraja is the highlight of the film. Arjun Janya’s music is good with melodious numbers like Alochane Aradhana. Two other peppy numbers are for the front benches". B S Srivani from Deccan Herald wrote "Overall, a satisfying effort, but a bit of dismay refuses to go away. Should reciting a lie a hundred times “always” make that lie the gospel truth? The “ardour” of Romeo easily washes away one of the fast-dissolving foundations of love - trust. Moral Science has never been popular. Has it?".

== Awards ==
Ceremony	Category	Nominee	Result
2nd South Indian International Movie Awards	Best Actor in a Supporting Role	Rangayana Raghu	Won
2nd South Indian International Movie Awards	Best Music Director	Arjun Janya	Won

== Home media ==
The movie was released on DVD with 5.1 channel surround sound, English subtitles, and VCD.
