= Tamil Nadu State Film Award for Best Film Portraying Women in a Good Light =

Indian film award

The Tamil Nadu State Film Award for Best Film Portraying Women in a Good Light is given by the state government as part of its annual Tamil Nadu State Film Awards for Tamil (Kollywood) films. This award in this specific category was first given in 1994. Introduction of the category was suggested by R. Sengottuvelan, a former judge of the Madras High Court and Chairman of the State Women's Commission. The award was discontinued after 2008, but revived in 2015, when it was won by Suriya's 36 Vayathinile.

== The list ==
Here is a list of the award winners and the films for which they won.

Year	Film	Ref.
1994	Karuthamma	
1995	Naan Petha Magane	
1996	Gokulathil Seethai	
1997	Paththini	
1998	Kizhakkum Merkkum	
1999	Anandha Poongatre	
2000	Iniya Udhayam	
2001	Jameela	
2002	Guruvamma	
2003	Not Awarded	
2004	Not Awarded	
2005	Kasthuri Maan	
2006	Kadhale En Kadhale	
2007	Mirugam	
2008	Poo	
2015	36 Vayadhinile	
2016	Aruvi	
2017	Dharma Durai	
2018	Kanaa	
2019	Ponmagal Vandhal	
2020	Kamali From Nadukkaveri	
2021	Netrikkan	
2022	Aval Appadithan 2	

== See also ==
- Tamil cinema
- Cinema of India
