= Sangeetha Sringeri =

Indian actress

- Born: 13 May 1996 (age 30); Sringeri, Karnataka, India
- Education: Kendriya Vidyalaya
- Occupations: Actress; Model
- Years active: 2016–present

Sangeetha Sringeri (born 13 May 1996) is an Indian actress and model who primarily works in the Kannada cinema and television. Starting her career on the small screen She became popular for her role as Sati in the Kannada daily soap Hara Hara Mahadeva, later went on to act as the lead in successful movies like 777 Charlie and Lucky Man. She finished as one of the finalists in the Femina Miss India beauty pageant in 2014 and was runner-up at the World Supermodel Pageant. In 2023, she appeared as a contestant in Kannada reality show Bigg Boss season 10 and emerged as a 2nd runner up.

== Personal life ==
Sangeetha was born on 13 May 1996 in Sringeri into a defense family. She is an NCC cadet and represented Karnataka in Kho kho, bagging a gold medal in 2012.

== Career ==
Sangeetha entered the acting industry through Star Suvarna's Hara Hara Mahadeva (TV series). The mythological drama brought her nickname Sati, Dakshayani opposite Vinay Gowda. She later participated in the Super Jodi season 2 reality show organized by the same channel.

Her first feature film was A+, which was released in 2018 She had gone through over 50 scripts before signing the movie A+ Kannada Movie. A+ was a subtle sequel of Upendra's cult classic "A"; the film was directed by Upendra's associate Vijay Surya. The film brought critical acclaim to Sangeetha for her portrayal of Yashaswini in the film.

Sangeetha's next big break was in 2022, as lead actress opposite Rakshit Shetty in 777 Charlie, produced by Paramvah Studios and presented by Pushkar Films. She was picked up to audition for the movie through Facebook, and she bagged the role amongst 2,700 other entries. Later that year, she also acted in Lucky Man and Pampa Panchalli Parashivamurthy.

In 2023–2024, she participated in Colors Kannada's reality show Bigg Boss Kannada 10 where she survived for 16 weeks inside the house and emerged as the 2nd runner up of the show.

== Filmography ==
=== Films ===
- All films are in Kannada unless otherwise noted

Key
†	Denotes films that have not yet been released

Year	Title	Role	Note	Ref.
2016	Karma	Agent	Short film	
2018	A+	Yashaswini	Lead actress	
2019	1saw2		Hindi Short film	
2019	Salagara Sahakara Sangha			
2022	777 Charlie	Devika Aradhya		
2022	Lucky Man	Anu Anthony Doniyappa		
2022	Pampa Panchalli Parashivamurthy	Lekhana		
2023	Shivaji Surathkal 2	Sharmila	Cameo appearance	
2024	Marigold	Sonu		
2026	Padmanabha and Family †			

=== Television ===
Year	Title	Role(s)	Language	Notes	Ref.
2016–2017	Hara Hara Mahadeva	Sati, Dakshayani	Kannada		
2017	Thene Manasaulu	Manasa	Telugu		
2017	Super Jodi	Contestant	Kannada	Season 2	
2022	Pajama Party	Herself	Kannada		
2023–2024	Bigg Boss Kannada	Contestant	Kannada	Season 10	

=== Music videos ===
List of Sangeetha Sringeri music video credits
Year	Title	Singer(s)	Label	Ref.
2025	"Achoo!" (A Baby Girl's Dream)	MC Bijju, Kiyara Tharak, Suraj Jois, Sangeethaa	TRK Films	

== Awards and nominations ==
Year	Award	Category	Show	Result
2019	Telly Award	Favourite Mytho Actress	Hara Hara Mahadeva	Won
2022	21st Santosham Film Awards	Best Actress – Kannada	Lucky Man	Won
