= Arjuna (film) =

- Promotional poster
- Directed by: P. C. Shekar
- Screenplay by: P. C. Shekar
- Story by: P. C. Shekar
- Produced by: K. Muthuraj; P. Ramesh
- Starring: Prajwal Devaraj; Bhama; Devaraj
- Cinematography: A.Kumaran
- Edited by: Saravanan
- Music by: Arjun Janya
- Production company: Arya Creations
- Release date: August 2015
- Country: India
- Language: Kannada

Arjuna is a 2015 Indian Kannada-language crime drama film directed by P. C. Shekar and stars Prajwal Devaraj, Devaraj and Bhama in the lead roles. First time father (Devaraj) and son (Prajwal Devaraj) share the screen. The film's music is scored by Arjun Janya.

== Plot ==
Arjuna is shown as a very good guy with great conscience. There is no clue about his dealing with a murder. But when the murder news opens up, Arjuna becomes uneasy, which deepens ACP Verma's doubt. The director does his job in a good manner in the first half. But the second half betrays us. The suspense eventually ends up in losing its flavor. The real reason for Arjuna's transformation could have been handled much better.

Devaraj comes out with a splendid performance. Prajwal, his real life offspring, has imbibed his role to a good extent and does it commendably. Bhama comes only in few scenes in the film, but does a neat job. The film has its share of double meaning dialogues, and they do nothing to make you smile. Dynamic's Star Devaraj's stunts are just ok. Updated by: Emjay Khan

== Cast ==
- Prajwal Devaraj as Arjuna
- Devaraj as CBI Officer
- Bhama
- Ramesh Bhat
- Sheethal
- Kaddipudi Chandru as MLA
- Rajashekar Naidu as Police Commissioner

== Production ==
P. C. Shekar had earlier titled the film as Kshatriya and cast Prajwal Devaraj and Devaraj opposite each other for the first time. Bhama was chosen to play the female lead. Since the title had already been registered by another producer, Shekar renamed the film as Arjuna. The official trailer was released on 30 July 2015 in the presence of actor Ganesh.

== Soundtrack ==
Arjuna

Soundtrack album by Arjun Janya
- Released: 14 July 2015
- Recorded: 2015
- Genre: Feature film soundtrack
- Label: Anand Audio

The film's soundtrack and original score is composed by Arjun Janya. The track list comprises only one song and three instrumental themes. Arjun Janya played all the themes during the audio launch on 14 July 2015 with his piano.

=== Track listing ===
No.	Title	Lyrics	Singer(s)	Length
1.	"Sakhiye Sakhiye"	Kaviraj	Karthik
2.	"Dynamic theme of Arjuna"		Instrumental
3.	"Mystery of Arjuna"		Instrumental
4.	"Soul of Arjuna"		Instrumental
