= Brinda Acharya =

Indian actress

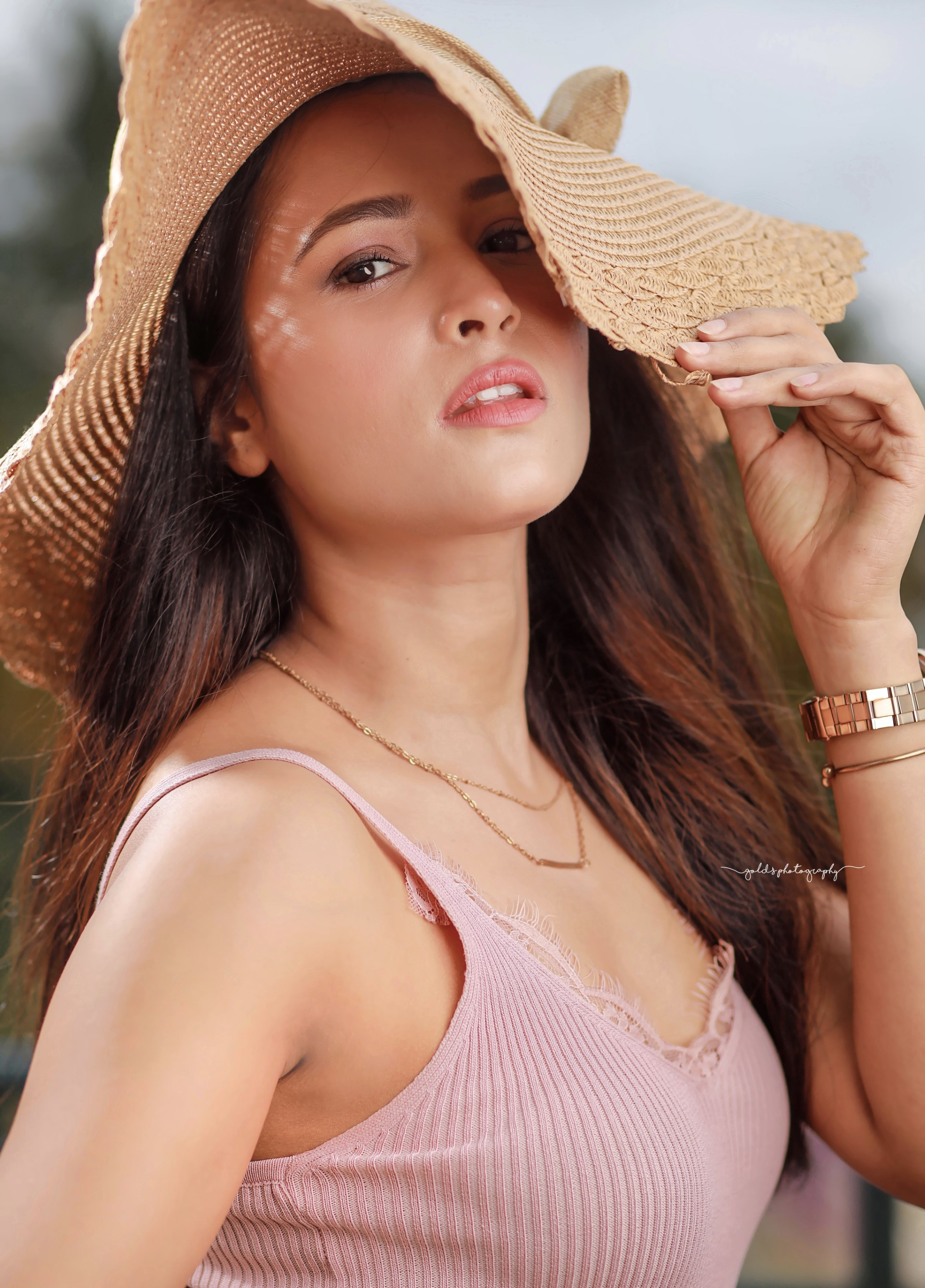
- Born: September 18, 1992 (age 33); Balkur, Uttara Kannada
- Occupation: Actress
- Years active: 2021–present

Brinda Acharya is an Indian actress who primarily works in the Kannada film industry. An engineer turned actor, she made her debut in 2021 with Premam Poojyam, which marked Nenapirali Prem’s 25th film. Known for her versatility and strong screen presence, Brinda has acted in romantic dramas and female-centric action films, earning critical acclaim for her performances. Her breakthrough came with the film, Kousalya Supraja Rama in 2023.

== Early life ==
Brinda was born on 18 September 1994 in Balkur, Uttara Kannada, Karnataka. She completed her schooling at Sri Dharmasthala Manjunatheshwara College, Ujire, and graduated in Electronics and Communication Engineering from KLE Society’s Lingaraj College, Belagavi. Before entering films, Brinda worked as a Senior Software Engineer at TCS, Mumbai and later as an IT Analyst at Infosys, Bangalore.

== Career ==
Brinda began her acting journey with the Kannada mythological serial Shani (2018), aired on Colors Kannada, where she portrayed Damini, Shani’s wife. She also appeared in a small role in the serial Mahakali. These roles helped her transition from television to cinema.

Brinda made her big-screen debut with Premam Poojyam (2021), playing Sherlyn Pinto/Angel. The film was a romantic drama and received positive reviews. In 2023, she starred in Juliet 2, a female-centric action thriller, which was praised for its storyline and her performance. Later that year, she appeared in Kousalya Supraja Rama, a romantic drama addressing gender stereotypes.

Her projects in the year 2025 include X & Y, Marutha, Bank of Bhagyalakshmi, and Reetuce.

== Filmography ==
Year	Film	Role	Notes
2021	Premam Poojyam	Sherlyn Pinto aka Angel	
2023	Juliet 2	Juliet	
2023	Kousalya Supraja Rama	Shivani	
2025	X & Y	Krupa	
2025	Marutha	Ananya	
2025	Bank of Bhagyalakshmi	Arpita	
TBA	Satya - S/O Harishchandra	Khushi	
TBA	Partner	Anika	
