= Vivekananda Institute of Technology =

Engineering college in Bangalore

- Other name: VKIT
- Motto: Education Manifests Perfection, Arise and Lead
- Type: Private, engineering College
- Established: 1997
- Academic affiliation: Visvesvaraya Technological University
- President: H C Balakrishna
- Principal: D V Chandrashekar
- Location: Bengaluru, Karnataka, India; 12.8572°N 77.4540°E
- Campus: Rural, 26 acres (11 ha)
- Website: vitb.ac.in

The Vivekananda Institute of Technology is located in Bangalore, Karnataka, India. It is affiliated to Visvesvaraya Technological University and approved by the All India Council for Technical Education. Vivekananda Institute of Technology (VKIT) is one of the engineering colleges in Karnataka. VKIT was established in the year 1997 by Janatha Education Society(JES) in its Silver Jubilee year. The students of VKIT are colloquially referred to as VKITians.

VKIT offers undergraduate courses of study and research including Bachelor of Engineering - Mechanical Engineering, Civil Engineering, Computer Science & Engineering, Information Science & Engineering, Electronics & Communication Engineering. VKIT is also a research centre in 4 areas of engineering disciplines.

== Janatha Education Society ==
Janatha Education Society (JES) was registered in 1972 by 12 promoters from various walks of life. Under the society, 16 Institutions are functioning in the name of Swamy Vivekananda from four different campuses.

== Location ==
VKIT campus is located on 26 acres (11 ha) of land near Kumbalagodu, Bangalore - Mysore State Highway (SH-17).

== Campus ==
Vivekananda Institute of Technology has on its Campus, Men's & Women's Hostels, Staff Quarters, Guest House, Cafeteria, Outdoor Sports and an Indoor Games Complex. The Institute power requirements are met by a dedicated HT Power Connection from BESCOM and Captive Power Generating units. The institute is connected to all the parts of the city by its own fleet of Buses. Scholarships/fellowships for meritorious and needy students in every department.

== Academics ==
=== Undergraduate courses ===
- B.E - Mechanical engineering
- B.E - Civil engineering
- B.E - Computer science and engineering
- B.E - Electronics and communication engineering
- B.E - Information science and engineering
- B.E- Artificial Intelligence and Machine Learning

== Activities ==
- IEEE - The college has an IEEE student branch. The IEEE-VKIT celebrates each year with various competitions such as On Spot Programming, Design and Debugging (Circuit debugging), Robotics, Paper Presentation, Gaming, Tech Quiz, Product Design, 8086/8051 Programming, Amazing Race, Photoshop Contest are held along with Workshops.
- VIBHIN - VIBHIN is the annual Cultural Fest held at VKIT every year.
