= Sushma Raj =

Indian Tamil actress

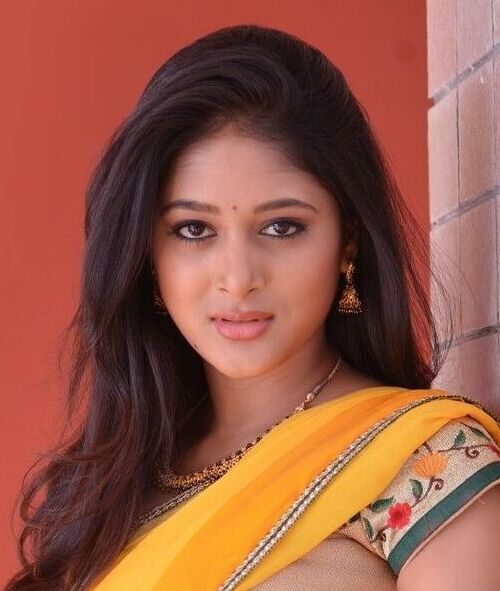
- Sushma in Joru
- Born: Bangalore, India
- Occupation: Actress
- Years active: 2013-Present

Sushma Raj is an Indian actress who has worked in the Tamil, Telugu and Kannada film industries.

== Career ==
Sushma Raj is settled in Bangalore and pursued a degree in fashion designing, before becoming an actress. Sushma made her acting debut with the Kannada romantic film, Madarangi (2013), in which she won positive reviews for her portrayal of her character. The film had a low-key release but became a sleeper hit at the box office and fetched further offers for the actress. Her breakthrough role was in the Telugu romantic thriller film, Maaya (2014) by G. Neelakanta Reddy, for which she auditioned and participated on workshops for, before beginning shoot. A critic noted Sushma "pulls off her role rather comfortably and manages to show the variations in her character without strain" and that "she is sincere and plays her part naturally". She was subsequently seen in Joru opposite Sundeep Kishan; the film fared poorly at the box office.

Sushma next appeared in the Tamil romantic comedy, India Pakistan (2015) opposite Vijay Antony and won positive reviews for her portrayal of a lawyer. A critic from Sify.com noted Sushma "emotes well and is perfect for the role" and linked her appearance to Anushka Shetty.

== Filmography ==
Films

Year	Film	Role	Language	Notes
2013	Chathrigalu Saar Chathrigalu	Anjali	Kannada	
2013	Madarangi		Kannada	
2014	Maaya	Pooja	Telugu	
2014	Joru	Shruti	Telugu	
2015	India Pakistan	Melina	Tamil	Nominated, SIIMA Best Debut Actress (Tamil)
2016	Nayaki	Sandhya	Telugu	
2016	Nayagi	Sandhya	Tamil	
2016	Eedu Gold Ehe	Geeta	Telugu	
2023	Tik Tok		Tamil	
