= Shreyas Manju =

Film actor

- Born: 5 April 1994 (age 32); Bangalore, Karnataka, India
- Occupation: Actor
- Years active: 2019–present
- Father: K. Manju

Shreyas Manju is an Indian film actor who works in the Kannada film industry. He is the son of producer K. Manju and made his acting debut with Padde Huli (2019). Known for his youthful energy and versatility, Shreyas has acted in action and romantic dramas and is considered one of Sandalwood’s promising young talents.

== Early life ==
Born on 5 April 1994 in Bengaluru, Karnataka, Shreyas grew up in a family deeply connected to cinema. His father, K. Manju, is a well-known producer in the Kannada film industry. Shreyas trained at the Satyanand Acting Institute in Vizag and is skilled in gymnastics, taekwondo, and parkour. He later pursued advanced filmmaking and acting courses in Chicago and the New York Film Academy to enhance his craft.

== Career ==
Shreyas made his debut in Kannada film industry with the movie Padde Huli (2019). directed by Guru Deshpande. playing a passionate college student. The film was well-received and established him as a promising newcomer.

He followed this with Raana (2022), an action drama directed by Nanda Kishore, where he played the titular role. In 2025, he starred in Vishnu Priya, a romantic drama directed by V. K. Prakash, and Marutha, directed by S. Narayan. He is also working on upcoming projects like Ondsala Meet Madona and Dildaar.

== Filmography ==
Key
†	Denotes films that have not yet been released

- All films are in Kannada unless otherwise noted.

Year	Film	Role(s)	Notes
2019	Padde Huli	Sampath Kumar	
2022	Raana	Raana	
2025	Vishnu Priya	Vishnu	
2025	Marutha	Eeshwar	
TBA	Ondsala Meet Madona		
TBA	Dildaar		
