= Marutha (2025 film) =

Indian Kannada-language action thriller film

- Theatrical release poster
- Directed by: S. Narayan
- Written by: S. Narayan
- Produced by: K. Manju; Ramesh Yadav
- Starring: Duniya Vijay; Shreyas Manju; V. Ravichandran; Brinda Acharya
- Cinematography: PKH Das; Kumar Gowda
- Edited by: Shivaprasad Yadav
- Music by: S. Narayan; Jassie Gift
- Production company: Eesha Productions
- Distributed by: Eesha Productions
- Release date: 21 November 2025
- Running time: 156 minutes
- Country: India
- Language: Kannada

Marutha is a 2025 Indian Kannada-language action thriller film directed by filmmaker S. Narayan. Produced under the banner Eashaa Productions by K. Manju and Ramesh Yadav, the film has an ensemble cast including Duniya Vijay, Shreyas Manju, V. Ravichandran, Brinda Acharya, Nishvika Naidu, Tara and Rangayana Raghu in pivotal roles.

The film released theatrically on 21 November 2025, and features soundtrack composed by S. Narayan and Jassie Gift, while the cinematography is by PKH Das and Kumar Gowda, the editing is by Shivaprasad Yadav. The film addresses the dangers of social media misuse, women’s safety, and family responsibility in the digital age.

== Plot ==
The story begins in Malenadu, where Eeshwar (Shreyas Manju), an engineering student, dreams of becoming a film director rather than focusing on his studies. His parents (played by Sharat Lohitashwa and Tara) struggle to keep him grounded, urging him to help with their small grocery business. Eeshwar spends most of his time with friends and his comic uncle Singarappa (Sadhu Kokila), indulging in mischief and cinema fantasies.

During a family event, Eeshwar meets Ananya (Brinda Acharya), a charming young woman who moves into his neighborhood. He falls in love at first sight. Their budding romance takes a turn when Ananya disappears under mysterious circumstances after a train journey where Eeshwar loses his tablet while taking a selfie with her. Rumors spread that the two have eloped, forcing Eeshwar and his uncle to clear their names.

Parallelly, the narrative introduces Anish Patil (Duniya Vijay), a tough crime branch officer investigating a human trafficking racket that exploits women through social media traps. His probe reveals a sinister network led by Matthew, who lures girls via fake profiles and sells them abroad. The investigation gains momentum when Anish finds Eeshwar and Ananya’s selfie, linking them to the case.

As the search intensifies, shocking truths emerge: Ananya had a Facebook friend named Vivek Kulkarni, whose involvement points to a larger conspiracy. The film moves across Bengaluru, Malenadu, and Goa, showcasing the gang’s operations and the police’s desperate attempts to rescue victims. Eeshwar’s personal quest to find Ananya intertwines with Anish’s mission, leading to high-octane chases, emotional confrontations, and revelations about trust and responsibility in the digital age. The climax delivers a strong social message: unchecked social media use can lead to catastrophic consequences, urging families to monitor online activities and prioritize safety. The film ends with Anish dismantling the trafficking ring and Eeshwar realizing the value of responsibility over reckless ambition.

== Cast ==
- Duniya Vijay as Anish Patil
- Shreyas Manju as Eeshwar
- Brinda Acharya as Ananya
- V. Ravichandran
- Nishvika Naidu
- Rangayana Raghu
- Tara as Eeshwar's mother
- Sharath Lohitashwa as Eeshwar's father
- Sadhu Kokila as Singarappa
- Pramod Shetty
- Chitra Shenoy
- Manju Pavagada

== Production ==
=== Development ===
S. Narayan conceived Maarutha as a wake-up call for the digital generation, inspired by real-life cases of online harassment and missing women. He emphasized that the film is not women-centric but deeply rooted in their experiences, aiming to spark conversations about safe social media practices.

== Music ==
The soundtrack consists of songs composed and written by S. Narayan. Additionally, Jassie Gift composed a single. Audio was released on Jhankar Music label.

Track listing
No.	Title	Lyrics	Singer(s)	Length
1.	"Chanda Maarutha"	S. Narayan	Chandan Shetty	4:40
2.	"Ondsala Meet Madona"	S. Narayan	Sonu Nigam	4:17
3.	"Nammamma Savadatthi Yellamma"	S. Narayan	Ananya Bhat	3:41
4.	"Yeno Maga"	S. Narayan	Chandan Shetty, Shamitha Malnad	3:41
5.	"Kanase Karagi Bidu (Music: Jassie Gift)"	S. Narayan	Haricharan	3:41
Total length:				13:33

== Critical reviews ==
Asianet Suvarna News described the film as "Vintage S. Narayan," highlighting its family drama, emotional depth, and strong message. The review praised Duniya Vijay’s intense portrayal of a cop and the director’s ability to blend social commentary with entertainment, though it mentioned that the narrative occasionally meanders with too many subplots.

Vishwavani News gave the film 2.5/5, calling it a suspense thriller with potential but lacking novelty. While the performances and action scenes were appreciated, the review criticized the film for predictable family drama elements and underutilized comedy tracks.
