= K. Manju =

Indian film producer and distributor

- Born: Kobari Manju; Turuvekere, Karnataka, India
- Occupations: Film producer Film distributor
- Years active: 2000–present

K. Manju is an Indian film producer and distributor, known for his films produced in Kannada cinema. He made several films through his two production companies, K Manju Cinemas and Lakshmishree Combines. A large number of his films have been commercially successful, some of them are among the top-ten highest grossing Kannada films of all time.

In 2014, Manju was reported to apply for the Limca Book of Records for producing a record five films at one given time. This included four Kannada films and one Tamil film.

== Filmography ==
Year	Film title	Director	Production House	Notes
1996	Anuraga Spandana	B. Ramamurthy		Co-produced with L. Mohan
1997	Jackie Chan	Thriller Manju		Co-produced with G. H. Gurumurthy
1998	Yamalokadalli Veerappan	H. C. Prakash	Bindushree Films	
1999	Underworld	K. Madhu	Bindushree Films	
2001	Rashtrageethe	K. V. Raju	Bindushree Films	
2001	Jenu Goodu	S. Umesh	Lakshmishree Combines	
2002	Jamindaru	S. Narayan	Lakshmishree Combines	
2003	Hrudayavantha	P. Vasu	Lakshmishree Combines	
2003	Lankesh Patrike	Indrajith Lankesh	Lakshmishree Combines; Aishwarya Combines	
2004	Sahukara	Om Prakash Rao	Lakshmishree Combines	
2005	Rama Shama Bhama	Ramesh Aravind	Lakshmishree Combines	
2005	Yashwanth	Dayal Padmanabhan	Lakshmishree Combines	
2006	Odahuttidavalu	Om Sai Prakash	Lakshmishree Combines	
2006	Neenello Naanalle	Dinesh Babu	Lakshmishree Combines	Co-produced with G. Chandrashekar and D. K. Devendra
2007	Maathaad Maathaadu Mallige	Nagathihalli Chandrashekar	Lakshmishree Combines	Won - Karnataka State Film Award for third Best Film
2008	Aramane	Nagashekar	Lakshmishree Combines	
2009	Yogi	Udaya Prakash	Bindushree Films	
2009	Bellary Naga	Dinesh Babu	Bindushree Films	
2009	Olave Jeevana Lekkachaara	Nagathihalli Chandrashekar	Lakshmishree Combines	
2009	Rajakumari	S. Govindraj	Lakshmishree Combines	
2010	Kiccha Huccha	Chi. Guru Dutt	Bindushree Films	Co-produced with Mark Balaji
2010	Shankar IPS	M. S. Ramesh	Bindushree Films	
2011	Shyloo	S. Narayan	K. Manju Cinemas	
2011	Kalla Malla Sulla	Udaya Prakash	K. Manju Cinemas	
2011	Jolly Boy	D. Sabhapathi	K. Manju Cinemas	
2012	Godfather	Sethu Sriram	K. Manju Cinemas	
2012	Shikari	Abhaya Simha	K. Manju Cinemas	Kannada— Malayalam bilingual film
2012	Narasimha	Mohan Shankar	M N K Movies	
2013	Raja Huli	Guru Deshpande	K. Manju Cinemas	
2013	Rajani Kantha	Pradeep Raj	K. Manju Cinemas	
2014	Bramman	Socrates	K. Manju Cinemas	Tamil film
2014	Super Ranga	Sadhu Kokila	K. Manju Cinemas	
2014	Ragini IPS	Anand P. Raju	K. Manju Cinemas	Also presenter
2014	Dil Rangeela	Preetham Gubbi	K. Manju Cinemas	
2016	Santhu Straight Forward	Mahesh Rao	K. Manju Cinemas	
2017	Smile Please	Raghu Samarth	K. Manju Cinemas	
2017	Satya Harishchandra	Dayal Padmanabhan	K. Manju Cinemas	
2022	Raana	Nanda Kishore	K. Manju Cinemas	
2025	Vishnu Priya	V.K. Prakash	K. Manju Cinemas	

As Presenter

Year	Film title	Notes
2001	Vaalee	
2003	Don	
2006	Good Luck	
2010	Gundragovi	

As Actor

Year	Film title	Notes
1998	Yamalokadalli Veerappan	Also producer
2010	Aithalakkadi	
2014	Neenade Naa	
2016	Jigarthanda	Guest appearance
2019	Padde Huli	Guest appearance
2021	Govinda Govinda	Guest appearance
