= Rajani Kantha =

- Directed by: Pradeep Raj
- Screenplay by: Pradeep Raj
- Produced by: K. Manju
- Starring: Duniya Vijay; Aindrita Ray
- Cinematography: R. Giri
- Edited by: Palanivel
- Music by: Arjun Janya
- Distributed by: K. Manju Cinemaas
- Release date: 1 March 2013
- Running time: 142 minutes
- Country: India
- Language: Kannada

Rajani Kantha is a 2013 Indian Kannada language romantic drama film directed by Pradeep Raj and produced by K. Manju. The film stars Duniya Vijay, playing dual roles along with Aindrita Ray in the lead roles. It is remake of 2004 Korean film My Brother. The film's music is composed by Arjun Janya and the cinematography is by Giri.

== Plot ==
Duniya Vijay plays a double role Rajani and Kantha with one of the characters is born with a cleft palate. The film's plot lies in how people with the condition deal with the jibes that come their way and emerge stronger.

== Cast ==
- Duniya Vijay as Rajani and Kantha
- Aindrita Ray as Priya
- Rekha
- Bullet Prakash
- Jasper
- Chikkanna

== Soundtrack ==
Rajanikantha

Soundtrack album by Arjun Janya
- Released: 14 December 2012
- Genre: Feature film soundtrack

No.	Title	Singer(s)	Length
1.	"Sattakku Satak"	Arjun Janya, Duniya Vijay
2.	"Olavina Kiranake"	Sonu Nigam, Archana Ravi
3.	"Yentani Sentu"	Chandan Shetty, Meghana Hebbar
4.	"Yavathhu Hingagilla"	Nakul Abhyankar
5.	"Parvagilla"	Chandan Shetty, Suma Shastry

== Reception ==
=== Critical response ===
Srikanth Srinivasa of Rediff gave the film a rating of two and a half out of five stars and wrote "Rajni Kantha is for Duniya Vijay's fans" praising Vijay's performance as Rajni in the film. A critic from The Times of India scored the film at 3 out of 5 stars and says "Vijay for his excellent performance in a double role, particularly Rajani with speech defect. Aindrita Ray has given life to her role with a splendid performance. Music by Arjun Janya has some catchy tunes. Camera by R Giri is eye catching". A Shardhha of The New Indian Express wrote "key. On the whole, the ingredients never catch fire in the lifeless script. Arjun Janya's music is good but is lost in the story and there is nothing to rave about Giri's cinematography. The Verdict: It is hard to swallow particularly in an era of diminishing expectations". A critic from News18 India wrote "The music of the film by Arjun Janya is melodious, and cinematography by R Giri is also average. All in all the film lacks a good narrative and is a waste of effort". B S Srivani from Deccan Herald wrote "Arjun Janya who whips up frothy tunes and dream concoctions for the mass and class alike. A little more homework would do wonders for the director and his hero, it must be said. However, Rajini Kantha also sends out a message: Any kind of publicity cannot always be ‘good’ publicity".
