= Joshelay =

Kannada web series

- Created by: Vinayak Joshi
- Written by: Vinayak Joshi
- Directed by: Vinayak Joshi
- Starring: Vinayaka Joshi; Duttanna; Upendra
- Narrated by: Vinayak Joshi
- Theme music composer: Dossmode
- Composers: Dossmode; Chandan Shetty
- Country of origin: India
- Original language: Kannada
- No. of seasons: 1
- No. of episodes: 7

Production
- Executive producer: Santhosh Narayan
- Producer: Vinayak Joshi
- Production location: Bengaluru
- Cinematography: Nagarjun Ravi, Sudhir Kowshik, Shiva Gajula, Akash R Joshi, Satish Kranthi, Praveen, Virat, Sharath Babu
- Editor: Santhosh Radhakrishnan
- Camera setup: Nagarjun Ravi
- Running time: 15-20 minutes
- Production company: Joshi Chitra
- Budget: USD $60,000(approx)

Original release
- Network: YouTube
- Release: 20 September 2018 – present

Joshelay is an Indian web series created by Vinayak Joshi. This Kannada series is a compilation of many inspirational stories from across the country. The protagonist runs 500 km (310 mi) for 50 days and narrates inspirational stories of 28 people who are physically and mentally disabled. The web series is available online on several online platforms free of charge, including YouTube and Facebook.

== Cast ==
- Vinayak Joshi
- Pradip Sinha
- Prabhakar Rao
- Charan Gowda Hassan
- Deepak Sridhar
- Srikanth Indira
- Srikanth
- Kristishan
- Jayanth Jeevith
- Chandan Shetty (cameo)
- Duttanna
- Master Shouryaa Anand
- Anand Yediyur
- Madhusudhan
- Elvis Joseph
- Vilas Nayak
- Manjunath
- Mahesh Londhe
- Sundarashree
- Viraat as Jeeva
- Suhas Karanth as Yama "Kinka" Kinkara
- Vasu Dixit as Jaawa, a halegannada name for Yamaraj
- Reena Raju
- Rohith Bhanuprakash
- Dr. K.B.Linge Gowda
- Sundarashree
- Chandrakala S V
- Sujith Venkataramaiah
- Nanda Gopal
- Vikram Attavar
- Raksha Jayaraj
- Master Atharva Venkataramaih
- Priyanka Sujith

== Episodes ==
No. overall	Episode	Title	Directed by	Written by	Original release date
1	1	"Manasondu Guriyondara Benneri"	Vinayak Joshi	Vinayak Joshi	20 September 2018
2	2	"Agalla Madalla"	Vinayak Joshi	Vinayak Joshi	27 September 2018
3	3	"Neene Gello Kudure"	Vinayak Joshi	Vinayak Joshi	4 October 2018
4	4	"I Am The Villain Part 1"	Vinayak Joshi	Vinayak Joshi	18 October 2018
5	5	"I Am The Villain Part 2"	Vinayak Joshi	Vinayak Joshi	1 November 2018
6	6	"Ninage Neene Guru"	Vinayak Joshi	Vinayak Joshi	21 January 2019

== Soundtrack ==
Joshelay

Soundtrack album by Dossmode and Chandan Shetty
- Released: 2018
- Recorded: 2017
- Genre: Soundtrack
- Length: 23:43
- Language: Kannada
- Label: Sakkath Music
- Producer: Dossmode
External audio
- Audio Jukebox on YouTube

Dossmode chronology
The Nation Wants to Know (2017)	Joshelay (2018)

Chandan Shetty chronology
Seizer (2017)	Joshelay (2018)	Gaanchali (2018)

Singles from Joshelay
- 1. "Manasondu" Released: 8 October 2018; 2. "Agalla Madalla" Released: 8 October 2018; 3. "Neene Gello Kudure" Released: 9 October 2018

The soundtrack album consists of seven tracks. The soundtrack and background score were composed by Dossmode while one song is composed by Chandan Shetty. The lyrics are by Sujith Venkataramaiah, Chandan Shetty and Vinayak Joshi.

Track listing
No.	Title	Lyrics	Music	Singer(s)	Length
1.	"Manasondu"	Sujith Venkataramaiah	Dossmode	Sujith Venkataramaiah, Varijashree Venugopal, Dossmode	03:17
2.	"Ninage Neene Guru"	Sujith Venkataramaiah, Vinayak Joshi	Dossmode	Dossmode	03:01
3.	"Neene Gello Kudure"	Sujith Venkataramaiah	Dossmode	Sujith Venkataramaiah, Varijashree Venugopal, Dossmode	04:32
4.	"I Am The Villain"	Sujith Venkataramaiah, Vinayak Joshi	Dossmode	Varun Venkatram, Dossmode	03:52
5.	"Agalla Madalla"	Chandan Shetty, Vinayak Joshi & From Bhagavad Gita	Chandan Shetty	Chandan Shetty, Varijashree Venugopal	04:13
6.	"Neenaagiru"	Sujith Venkataramaiah	Dossmode	Sanjith Hegde	03:31
7.	"Mind-Body Connection"	Sujith Venkataramaiah	Dossmode	Dossmode	02:11
