= Padde Huli =

2019 film by Guru Deshpande

Peddu Huli
- Theatrical Poster
- Directed by: Guru Deshpande
- Screenplay by: Guru Deshpande
- Story by: K. Manju; Hiphop Tamizha
- Based on: Meesaya Murukku by Hiphop Tamizha
- Produced by: M. Ramesh Reddy (Nangli)
- Starring: Shreyas Manju; Nishvika Naidu; V. Ravichandran
- Cinematography: K. S. Chandrashekar
- Edited by: K. M. Prakash
- Music by: B. Ajaneesh Loknath
- Production company: Tejaswini Enterprises
- Release date: April 19, 2019
- Running time: 161 minutes
- Country: India
- Language: Kannada

Padde Huli (transl. Experienced Tiger) is a 2019 Indian Kannada language action drama film written by K. Manju and directed by Guru Deshpande. Produced by M. Ramesh Reddy, film's music is scored by B. Ajaneesh Loknath. Shreyas Manju and Nishvika Naidu feature in lead roles along with V. Ravichandran, Sudharani and playing the supporting characters while Rakshit Shetty and Puneeth Rajkumar appears in a guest role. K. S. Chandrashekar is the cinematographer of the film under the banner of Tejaswini Enterprises. This movie is remake of the 2017 Tamil film Meesaya Murukku.

== Plot ==
Sampath is a young man who wishes to pursue his passion for music while dealing with his father's skepticism and the opposition on his ladylove's family to their union. He has a year to make his passion for music and Sangeetha amount to something.

== Cast ==
- Shreyas Manju as Sampath
- Nishvika Naidu as Sangeetha
- V. Ravichandran as Sampath's father
- Sudharani as of Sampath's mother
- Chikkanna
- Vinayak Joshi
- Dharamanna Kadur
- Amith Vishwanath
- Madhusudhan Rao as Maarikambaa, Sangeetha's uncle
- Sundar Ram
- Swathi Gurudatt
- Bhaskar Surya
- Sundar as Sangeetha's father
- Rakshit Shetty as Karna (Cameo appearance)
- Puneeth Rajkumar as himself (Cameo appearance)
- K. Manju in a special appearance
- Yogaraj Bhat in a special appearance

== Soundtrack ==
Padde Huli

Soundtrack album by B. Ajaneesh Loknath
- Released: 2019
- Recorded: 2018
- Genre: Soundtrack
- Length: 39:08
- Label: PRK Audio
- Producer: C. R. Bobby

B. Ajaneesh Loknath chronology
Bell Bottom (2019)	Padde Huli (2019)	Avane Srimannarayana (2019)

Singles from Padde Huli
- 1. "Naa Tumba Hosaba Bossu" Released: Feb 4, 2019; 2. "I Love The Way U Hate Me" Released: Feb 11, 2019; 3. "Heli Hogu Kaarana" Released: Feb 15, 2019; 4. "Kalabeda Kolabeda" Released: Mar 3, 2019; 5. "Choor Chooragide" Released: Mar 23, 2019

The soundtrack is composed by B. Ajaneesh Loknath.

No.	Title	Lyrics	Singer(s)	Length
1.	"Nan Tumba Hosaba Bossu"	V. Nagendra Prasad	Shashank Sheshagiri, Gubbi	04:16
2.	"Yanda Yendati"	G. P. Rajarathnam	Narayan Sharma, MC Bijju	03:20
3.	"Baduku Jataka Bandi"	D. V. Gundappa	Siddharth Mahadevan	4:33
4.	"Ondu Mathali"	Nagarjun Sharma	Sanjith Hegde	5:14
5.	"Ninna Premada Pariya"	K. S. Narasimhaswamy	Narayan Sharma, C.R.Bobby, Gubbi	4:19
6.	"Choor Choor"	Puneeth Arya	B. Ajaneesh Loknath, C. R. Bobby	4:49
7.	"Kalabeda Kolabeda"	Basavanna	Narayan Sharma	4:25
8.	"Ji Ji Ji"	Ghouspeer	Chethan Gandharva, Ajaneesh Loknath	4:44
9.	"Heli Hogu Kaarana"	B. R. Lakshman Rao	Siddharth Mahadevan, Gubbi	4:33
10.	"Title Song – Padde Huli"	Chethan Kumar	Chandan Shetty, MC Bijju

== Critical reception ==
Shyam Prasad S. of Bangalore Mirror rated the film 3.5/5 stars and wrote, "The story is straightforward and easily predictable. [...] Some of the fights also seem to be just a showcase of the new actor. These niggling worries aside, Paddehuli is a decent entertainer and one that is executed well." A. Sharadhaa of The New Indian Express gave it 3.5/5 stars and wrote, "Though the story is not all that original, director Guru Deshpande presents it in such a way as to make it seem fresh."

Sunayana Suresh of The Times of India gave the film 3/5 stars and wrote, "Paddehuli might not be one of the edgy new-age subjects, but it does provide the old school entertainment in a remixed manner. If that is what you are looking for, then this might just just work for you." Aravind Shwetha of The News Minute wrote, "Director Guru Deshpande has his own way of treating remakes and that can be witnessed in Padde Huli as well. What makes Padde Huli stand out is the realistic treatment which gives it a slice of life feel, especially when it comes to the portrayal of college days."

Jagadish Angadi of Deccan Herald gave it 2/5 stars and wrote, "The plot lacks an edgy, new-age subject and a realistic treatment. The narrative is extremely slow and will try the audience's patience." Shashiprasad S. M. of Deccan Chronicle wrote, "The duration is one of the main concern especially the initial hiccups which may test one\'s patience."
