= Double Engine (2018 film) =

- Film poster
- Directed by: Chandra Mohan
- Written by: Chandra Mohan
- Produced by: Mandara A Shrikanth B Mathapati; Arun Kumar N Madhusudan NS; Venu Narsandra; Padma Krishna Murthy; R Ramesh; Rraju
- Starring: Chikkanna; Suman Ranganath; Priyanka Malnad; Sadhu Kokila
- Cinematography: Mohan
- Edited by: Venky
- Music by: Veer Samarth
- Production company: SRS
- Release date: July 13, 2018
- Country: India
- Language: Kannada

Double Engine is a 2018 Indian Kannada-language comedy film written, directed by Chandra Mohan. The film stars Chikkanna, Suman Ranganath, Priyanka Malnad, Sadhu Kokila in the lead roles. The score and soundtrack for the film is composed by Veer Samarth and the cinematography is by Surya S. Kiran.

A remake of the film is planned to be made in Marathi, by producer Pramod Bakadiya.

== Plot ==
The film revolves around three boys who set out to make money by using numerous shortcut-ways possible which lands them into a series of interesting yet funny incidents.

== Cast ==
- Chikkanna
- Suman Ranganath
- Priyanka Malnad
- Sadhu Kokila
- H. G. Dattatreya
- Achyuth Kumar
- Shobaraj

== Reception ==
New Indian Express gave the film three stars out of five, calling the film "a one-time watch, if you are only looking for reasons to laugh and pass time".

== Soundtrack ==
Musician Veer Samarth was born in a family of musicians at Bangalore, India, classical singer and has scored the soundtrack and score for the film. Songs are penned by Manju Mandavya and Naveen Kumar.

Track listing
No.	Title	Lyrics	Singer(s)	Length
1.	"Amase Divsa"	Manju Mandavya	Vijay Prakash	03:26
2.	"Nam Hudugiyu"	Naveen Kumar	Sachin Basruru	03:32
3.	"Alnodu Ilinodu"	Naveen Kumar	Sanjith Hegde	04:39
4.	"Bari Moore Dinada"	Naveen Kumar	Chinthan Vikas	04:01
