= Paddayi =

- Theatrical release poster
- Directed by: Abhaya Simha
- Produced by: Nithyananda Pai
- Edited by: Prashant Pandit
- Music by: Manikanth Kadri
- Release date: 2018
- Country: India
- Language: Tulu

Paddayi (transl. West) is a 2018 Indian Tulu-language drama film directed by Abhaya Simha. The film stars Mohan Sheni, Bindu Rakshidhi, Chandrahas Ullal, Gopinath Bhat, Avinash Rai, Sadashiv Ninasam, Shrinidhi Achar, Prabhakar Kapikad, Vani Peruvodi, Ravi Bhat, Mallika and others. The movie is an adaptation of Shakespeare's Macbeth.

== Plot ==
Paddayi is a modern-day adaptation of Shakespeare's epic drama, ‘Macbeth’. This version of Macbeth plays out in a tiny village in the borders of a modern city in coastal Karnataka, India. The characters in the film belong to an indigenous community of fishermen. Madhava and Sugandhi are a newly married couple. Their lust for a better life and thirst for upward mobility is ignited by the prophecies from a spirit that wanders the land. Dinesha, the owner of a shipping fleet gives them new dreams and hopes. But when their life is on a new high, Dinesha betrays and takes back what he gave. Now Madhava and Sugandhi are determined to take revenge. They set out on a journey riding the tides of ambition, dotted by their personalities. Sugandhi provokes and Madhava is provoked. Madhava in order to win over his insecurities, defeats his morality. The story soon turns into a tale of murders and regrets.

== Cast ==
- Srinidhi Achar as Manjesha
- Gopinath Bhat as Dineshanna, a merchant
- Ravi Bhat as Sadashiva
- Mallika Jyotigudde
- Prabhakar Kapikad as Aitha
- Sadashiva Ninasam as Sanjeeva
- Vani Periodi as Shankari
- Avinash Rai as Rakesha
- Bindu Raxidi as Sugandhi
- Mohan Sheni as Madhava
- Chandrahas Ullal as Bannanje

== Release ==
Paddayi was released on Amazon Prime Video in September 2019 but was wrongly categorized under the Kannada films category, despite being a Tulu film. In April 2020, the film was removed from the platform without any disclosure of reasons.

== Reception ==
Prathyush Parasuraman of Film Companion called the film "a visually stunning retelling of Macbeth in a fishing town." He criticized the fact that the title card is in Kannada but not in Tulu, since it's a Tulu film.

== Awards ==
- 65th National Film Awards – Best Feature Film in Tulu.
- Karnataka State Film Award for Third Best Film in 2017.
