= Bhavai (film) =

2021 Indian love story film

- Theatrical release poster
- Directed by: Hardik Gajjar
- Written by: Hardik Gajjar
- Screenplay by: Hardik Gajjar; Shreyes Anil Lowlekar
- Produced by: Dhaval Jayantilal Gada; Aksshay Jayantilal Gada; Parth Gajjar; Hardik Gajjar; Richa Amod Sachan
- Starring: Pratik Gandhi; Aindrita Ray
- Cinematography: Chirantan Das
- Edited by: Kannu Prajapati; Satya Sharma
- Music by: Prasad Sashte
- Production companies: Hardik Gajjar Films; Backbencher Pictures; Pen Studios
- Release date: 22 October 2021
- Running time: 114 minutes
- Country: India
- Language: Hindi

Bhavai is a 2021 Indian Hindi-language romance film written and directed by Hardik Gajjar and featuring Pratik Gandhi and Aindrita Ray in the lead roles. The film was released theatrically on 22 October 2021.

== Synopsis ==
Bhavai, also known as Vesha or Swang, is a popular folk theatre form of western India, especially in Gujarat.

The film is set against the backdrop of folk art form Bhavai. Basically a dramatic entertainer, it tells the story of two lovers in the village of Khakhar, where they are portraying two characters in Ramlila.

== Cast ==
- Pratik Gandhi as Raja Ram Joshi
- Aindrita Ray as Rani
- Flora Saini as Urmi
- Rajendra Gupta as Panditji
- Rajesh Sharma as Bajrangi
- Abhimanyu Singh as Bhawar
- Ankur Vikal as Bhurelal
- Ankur Bhatia as Lachhu
- Gopal K. Singh as Ratan Singh
- Anil Rastogi as Netaji
- Krishna Bisht as Gomu
- Bhagyashree Mote as Pyari

== Production ==
The film was shot in the village of Kutch Nani-Khakhar and Rann of Kutch in June 2018. Initially titled as Ravaan Leela, the title was changed to Bhavai in September 2021 following "audience outrage".

== Release ==
The film was theatrically released on 22 October 2021.

== Soundtrack ==
Bhavai

Soundtrack album by Shabbir Ahmed
- Released: 15 September 2021
- Recorded: 2020
- Genre: Feature film soundtrack
- Length: 30:12
- Language: Hindi
- Label: Zee Music Company

Official audio
- Bhavai - Full Album on YouTube

The soundtrack of the film was composed and lyrics written by Shabbir Ahmed and folk Ramayan part of film is composed by Aanand Shandilyaa.

Track listing
No.	Title	Singer(s)	Length
1.	"Ishq Fitoori"	Mohit Chauhan	4:13
2.	"Siyapati Ramchandra"	Amit Mishra, Shambhavi Raj	4:29
3.	"Kahe Muskay Re"	Shreya Ghoshal	4:44
4.	"Bansuri"	Aaman Trikha, Swati Sharma, Karsan Sargathiya, Ikka	5:05
5.	"Mom Ki Gudiya"	Aaman Trikha	5:17
6.	"Mohe Ram Rang Rang De"	Udit Narayan, Shreya Ghoshal	6:24
Total length:			30:12

== Reception ==
Hiren Kotwani writing for The Times of India rated the film with 3.5 stars out of 5. Praising the performance of Pratik Gandhi he wrote, "[he] delivers a wonderful performance as Raja Ram [and] convincingly portrays the conflict and the myriad emotions of his character". Appreciating the cinematography of Chirantan Das, he stated, "cinematography is beautiful, pleasing to the eyes and enhances the scenes." Kotwani liked the music and said, "Shabbir Ahmed’s wonderful soundtrack inspired by Gujarati folk music, adds to the narrative." Concluding he opined, "Bhavai also has some old-world charm: ... the treatment of opening credits with a golden touch to the black-and-white animation and ear-pleasing classical score." Jai Arjun Singh reviewing for Firstpost gave the film 2.5 stars out of 5 and wrote, "Bhavai is a determinedly inoffensive work, almost to the point of being a soporific – and as harmless as a Kumbhkarna who has just swallowed that soporific." For The Indian Express, Shubhra Gupta gave the film 1.5 stars out of 5 and stated, "[The film] should have been an entertaining, thought-provoking watch, especially because it is done in the colourful folksy Bhavai style." Gupta further added, "But the whole thing is so dated, with everyone being made to declaim loudly, that the tone the film wishes to achieve gets lost." Joginder Tuteja of Rediff rated it 3 out of 5. He praised the performances but criticised the length and narrative.
