= Raja Huli =

2013 Indian film by Guru Deshpande

- Poster
- Directed by: Guru Deshpande
- Screenplay by: Guru Deshpande
- Story by: S. R. Prabhakaran
- Based on: Sundarapandian
- Produced by: K. Manju
- Starring: Yash; Meghana Raj; Vasishta N. Simha
- Cinematography: K. M. Vishnuvardhan
- Edited by: K. M. Prakash
- Music by: Hamsalekha
- Production company: Lakshmisri Combines
- Release date: 1 November 2013
- Running time: 158 minutes
- Country: India
- Language: Kannada
- Budget: ₹3 crore
- Box office: ₹12 crore

Raja Huli is a 2013 Indian Kannada-language action comedy-drama film directed by Guru Deshpande. Produced by K. Manju, the film stars Yash in title role, along with Meghana Raj, Vasishta N. Simha, Charan Raj, Mithra, and Chikkanna in supporting roles. The soundtrack and score are composed by Hamsalekha. The movie is a remake of the 2012 Tamil movie Sundarapandian directed by S. R. Prabhakaran.

The film, which made its theatrical release on 1 November 2013, coinciding with the Kannada Rajyotsava festival became a commercial hit at the box office. It was Yash's third consecutive hit after Drama and Googly, paving the way for Yash to emerge as one of the top stars of Kannada cinema.

== Plot ==
Raja Huli is the son of a rich landlord in Mandya. He leads a happy life and spends all his time with his friends. Raja Huli ensures that he is always of some help to his friends. One day, he goes to ensure that his friend's love is conveyed to a girl named Kaveri, who happens to be his ex-flame. As it happens, she falls in love with Raja Huli again. But Raja Huli realises that one of his best friends, Jagga, loves Kaveri. A murder happens, the blame falls on Raja Huli, and the remaining incidents form the climax.

== Cast ==
- Yash as Raja Huli
- Meghana Raj as Kaveri
- Vasishta N. Simha as Jagga
- Harsha as Moni
- Chikkanna as Chikka
- Charan Raj
- Mithra as Andravi
- Ashwini Gowda as Mayuri
- Manu
- Shashikala
- M. N. Lakshmi Devi as Rajahuli's grandmother
- Sudha Belawadi as Kaveri's mother
- Nishchitha Gowda
- Hamsa Prathap as Savitri
- Soujanya
- Girish Shivanna as Cheluvaraj
- Aruna Balraj as Rajahuli's mother
- Jadesh Kumar
- Prakash Heggodu
- Vijay Koundinya
- Manju Mandavya as Bharatha
- Raj Kumar
- Jayaram
- Gajendra Rao
- Gandasi Nagaraj
- Rangayana Raghu as Rajahuli. This actor appeared alongside Darshan in Suntaragaali (2006)

== Soundtrack ==
Raja Huli

Soundtrack album by Hamsalekha
- Released: 20 October 2013
- Recorded: 2013
- Genre: Feature film soundtrack
- Length: 23:39
- Label: D Beats

Hamsalekha created the music and lyrics for the film. The lyrics for the soundtrack "Falling In Love" were penned by Yogaraj Bhat. The album has six soundtracks.

No.	Title	Lyrics	Singer(s)	Length
1.	"Chaltha Chaltha"	Hamsalekha	Sonu Nigam	4:03
2.	"Falling In Love"	Yogaraj Bhat	V. Harikrishna	3:38
3.	"Kaveri Kaveri"	Hamsalekha	Kavita Krishnamurthy	4:40
4.	"Loveenalli Bidre"	Hamsalekha	Hemanth Kumar, Shamitha Malnad	5:03
5.	"Om Hindu Guruthu"	Hamsalekha	Shankar Mahadevan	4:00
6.	"Yavvanada Gundigeya"	Hamsalekha	Desi Mohan	2:15
Total length:				23:39

== Critical reception ==
A critic from The Times of India wrote that "It is a romantic story very well handled by Deshapande with some great sequences". Shyam Prasad S. of Bangalore Mirror wrote that "The film is a perfect blend of entertainment and drama".

== Box office ==
Raja Huli was released on 1 November 2013, the day of Kannada Rajyotsava and got a fantastic opening at the box office upon release. The film took the box office by storm despite facing competition from a major Bollywood release Krrish 3. According to trade reports, collections of Raja Huli was better than Krrish 3 at Bangalore Box Office. It also did good business on weekdays and collected approximately ₹5 crore Nett and ₹8 crore Gross in the first week. The movie, which was made with a budget of ₹6 crore, recovered its production cost in just seven days. Raja Huli went on to complete 119 days of successful run, collected a total of ₹18 crore, and performed fairly well at the box-office. Raja Huli also became Yash's third consecutive success after Drama and Googly.
