= Shikari (2012 film) =

2012 film by Abhaya Simha

- Malayalam poster
- Directed by: Abhaya Simha
- Written by: Abhaya Simha
- Produced by: K. Manju
- Starring: Mammootty; Poonam Bajwa
- Cinematography: Dr. Vikram Shrivastava
- Edited by: Chotta Raman
- Music by: V. Harikrishna; Pritam Chakraborty
- Production company: K. Manju Films
- Release dates: 9 March 2012 (Kerala); 30 March 2012 (Karnataka)
- Country: India
- Languages: Malayalam; Kannada

Shikari is a 2012 Indian bilingual fantasy film in Malayalam and Kannada written and directed by Abhaya Simha, stars Mammootty and Poonam Bajwa. The film was the Kannada debut of Mammootty, and Malayalam debut of director Abhay Simha and music director V. Harikrishna. Both Mammooty and Poonam Bajwa play double roles, set in two different timelines.

== Plot ==
Software professional Abijit (Abhilash in Malayalam) / Arun (Karunan in Malayalam) delves into the pages of a novel written by Gopinath Shindhe (Gopinatha Pillai in Malayalam). As Abijit evinces interest in knowing more about the past history because the pages in the book are missing, he comes to Manjinadka, a beautiful place rich in environment. Abijith reaches the place of Gopinath Shinde house that is almost on the verge of being sold by his daughter Nanditha. Interestingly, Abijith visualizes Nanditha as Renuka in the novel and he explains his intentions of knowing what happened further. As the story peddles from past to present the emergence of British rule, the tiger suffocating the people life in the village, the mad man surprises Abijith. The twist in the tale comes when the last clue to the past is cremated. Nanditha then discloses that after she realised that Aruna is herself in the eyes of Abijit it became obvious for her to create the further missing links to the story. The intention of Nanditha is to get Abijith as her life partner because she is alone in her life.

== Cast ==
Cast (Malayalam)	Cast (Kannada)	Role (Malayalam)	Role (Kannada)
Mammootty		Karunan, Abhilash	Aruna, Abhijith
Poonam Bajwa		Nandita, Renuka	Nandita, Renuka
Mohan Shankar			
Sihi Kahi Chandru			
Innocent		Sitharam Setu	Sitharam Setu
Sharath Lohitashwa			
Tini Tom	Achyuth Kumar	Ramankutty	Rama Mithra
Suresh Krishna	Ninasam Ashwanth	Abdulla	Abdulla
Sathish Ninasam		Manju	Madhu
Aditya		Dream Seller in "Indrajaala Ondu"/ "Niramulla Kanavukal" song	

== Production ==
The title role of the film is played by Mammootty. About his casting, he says: "I was drawn to this project by the director's (Abhay Simha) vision to make this concept believable". Poonam Bajwa has been signed in to play the heroine. She will be playing the love interest of character played by Mammootty. Sharmila Mandre was also approached to do this role.

== Soundtrack ==
Shikari

Soundtrack album by V. Harikrishna
- Released: 9 March 2012
- Recorded: 2012
- Genre: Feature film soundtrack
- Length: 23:01 (Malayalam); 21:56 (Kannada)
- Languages: Malayalam; Kannada
- Labels: Satyam Audios (Malayalam); Anand Audio (Kannada)
External audio
- Shikari - Jukebox - Malayalam on YouTube
- Shikari - Jukebox - Kannada on YouTube

The soundtrack of the album was released on 20 March 2012. Shikari consists of five songs composed by V. Harikrishna, V. Nagendra Prasad, Kaviraj and Jayanth Kaikini are the lyricists who have penned the lyrics for the songs.

Track listing - Malayalam
No.	Title	Lyrics	Singer(s)	Length
1.	"Kannino Kalabhamaya"	Vayalar Sarath Chandra Varma	Vijay Yesudas, K. S. Chithra	4:22
2.	"Va Va Veera"	Murukan Kattakada	Shankar Mahadevan	4:45
3.	"Karimughile"	Santhosh Varma	K. S. Chithra	4:45
4.	"Niramulla kanavukal"	Kaithapram	Vijay Yesudas, Vijay Prakash	4:38
5.	"Thaazhvarayile"	Murukan Kattakada	K. S. Chithra	4:31
Total length:				23:01

Track listing - Kannada
No.	Title	Singer(s)	Length
1.	"Indrajaala Ondu"	Vijay Prakash, Chetan Sosca	4:37
2.	"Kannadiye Kannadiye"	Vani Harikrishna	4:42
3.	"Ninthu Nodalenu"	Chetan Sosca, Suma Shastry	4:23
4.	"Rajakuvari Preethi"	Anuradha Bhat	4:30
5.	"Dho Dho Hubbaliraya"	Hemanth Kumar	4:24
Total length:			21:56

== Critical reception ==
=== Malayalam version ===
The movie got mixed reviews.

A critic from The Times of India scored the film at 1.5 out of 5 stars and says "Towards the end of the film, Nanditha, a character played by Poonam Bajwa worryingly looks around and asks herself, “Where is this story heading?” One could almost hear her desperation resonating in the multiple sighs among the audience". Paresh C Palicha from Rediff.com scored the film at 1 out of 5 stars and wrote "The performances are too theatrical. Mammootty and Poonam Bajwa play dual roles, one contemporary and one historical. But both of them look like they have no idea what they are supposed to do. The same is the case with the supporting cast led by Innocent. Final words, Shikaari is shoddy and can be avoided".

=== Kannada version ===
The movie received positive reviews.

A critic from The Times of India scored the film at 4 out of 5 stars and says "Mammotty delivers an amazing performance and deserves full marks for dubbing in Kannada, which at times, sounds broken but is impressive. Poonam Bajwa is lively. Mohan Achyuth Kuma[r] and Neenasam Ashwath does justice to their roles. While Vikram Srivastav needs a special mention for his brilliant cinematography, V Harikrishna is equally commendable for his musical numbers". S Viswanath from Deccan Herald wrote "Shikari, which takes off on a very off-putting note, turns out into disappointing hunting expedition with no sting or snarl in its tacky elusive tiger tale. Wishing Abhay comes into his own in next outing, one hopes Shikari finds appreciative audience". A critic from The New Indian Express wrote "Kudos to producer K Manju, who has chosen to make this bilingual film with a good story line, following several commercial films. Verdict: A whiff of fresh air in Kannada film industry after a long time. Go watch, if only to encourage". A critic from Bangalore Mirror wrote "Having been placed graphically, it gets finely blended into the visuals. Poonam Baweja's lovely presence can easily keep the audience hooked. Simha probably had a very different story to tell, but what he intended is not seen on the screen". A critic from News18 India wrote "Shrivastava's camera work captures the old structures and interiors very well. The art direction by Dinesh Mangalore is also commendable. 'Shikari' is a good attempt despite some major mistakes".
