= Baanadariyalli =

- Directed by: Preetham Gubbi
- Screenplay by: Preetham Gubbi
- Story by: Preetha Jayaraman
- Produced by: Sri Vaare Talkies
- Starring: Ganesh; Rukmini Vasanth; Reeshma Nanaiah
- Cinematography: Abhilash Kalathi
- Edited by: Deepu S. Kumar
- Music by: Arjun Janya
- Production company: Sri Vaare Talkies
- Distributed by: KRG Studios
- Release date: 28 September 2023
- Running time: 149 minutes
- Country: India
- Language: Kannada

Baanadariyalli ( transl. On the path to the sky) is a 2023 Indian Kannada-language romantic drama film directed by Preetham Gubbi and produced by Sri Vaare Talkies. The film stars Ganesh, Rukmini Vasanth and Reeshma Nanaiah in lead roles. The film is the first Kannada project to have shot in Kenya's Maasai Mara National Reserve. The film marks the fourth collaboration of Ganesh and Preetham Gubbi. Baanadariyalli was released on 28 September 2023.

== Cast ==
- Ganesh as Siddharth a.k.a. Siddu
- Rukmini Vasanth as Leela
- Reeshma Nanaiah as Kadambari
- Rangayana Raghu as Leela's father
- Ashok Sharma
- Alaknanda Srinivas as Jayaraj C.
- Aaradhya N. Chandra as young Leala

== Production ==
In March 2022, it was reported that director-writer Preetham Gubbi would team up with actor Ganesh again for the fourth time. It was reported that V. Harikrishna would compose the music for the film, but was replaced by Arjun Janya. A 30-day filming schedule was finished in September 2022, the filming moved to Kenya, Africa where they shot some scenes in the wild forest range of Maasai Mara. The film's title is based on the song of the same name from Bhagyavantha (1981).

== Soundtrack ==
The music of the film is composed by Arjun Janya and released under Anand Audio.

Baanadariyalli

Soundtrack album by Arjun Janya
- Released: 2023
- Recorded: 2023
- Genre: Feature film soundtrack
- Language: Kannada
- Label: Anand Audio

Official audio
- Baanadariyalli - Album on YouTube

Track listing
No.	Title	Lyrics	Singer(s)	Length
1.	"Baanadariyalli Hode Yelli"	Kaviraj	Rajesh Krishnan
2.	"Ninnanu Nodida"	Kaviraj	Sonu Nigam
3.	"Maathella Haage Ide"	Jayanth Kaikini	Armaan Malik
4.	"Gold Fish"	Kaviraj	Aishwarya Rangarajan; Nishan Rai

== Reception ==
=== Critical response ===
Vinay Lokesh of The Times of India gave 3/5 stars and wrote "While the film could have done with a tighter screenplay, this is definitely a film to catch at the theatres this week. Again, the story is emotional, enough to keep you misty eyed, do be prepared." Vivek M. V. of The Hindu wrote "‘Baanadariyalli’ is a missed opportunity as director-writer Preetham Gubbi makes a mess of an interesting premise."

A Sharadhaa reviewing for The New Indian Express rated 3 out of 5 stars. 'Baanadariyalli' is a unique love story that transcends boundaries and linguistic barriers, offering a fusion of suspense, pain, and adventure. The film explores the unusual bond between Vasu, his daughter Leela, and Siddhu, with heartfelt performances by the cast, especially Ganesh and Rangayana Raghu. While the second half could have been faster, the emotional journey in the last 30 minutes resonates with the audience. The film's picturesque settings and diverse songs add to its charm, making it a family-friendly movie that delves into the complexities of love and relationships."

Shashiprasad S. M. of The South First gave 2/5 stars and wrote "'Baanadariyalli' is shallow in almost every aspect of entertainment, just like Leela is seen surfing on shallow waters in the film." Subha. J. Rao of The News Minute wrote "The film [Baanadariyalli], on paper, is about acceptance, moving on, and living life again. That sounds good enough, but the path to get there is laden with cliches galore."
