= Vishnu Priya =

Indian romantic film

- Theatrical release poster
- Directed by: V. K. Prakash
- Written by: V. K. Prakash
- Screenplay by: Ravi Srivatsa
- Story by: Sindhushree
- Produced by: K. Manju
- Starring: Shreyas Manju; Priya Prakash Varrier
- Cinematography: A. Vinod Bharathi
- Edited by: Suresh Urs
- Music by: Gopi Sundar
- Production company: K. Manju Cinemaas
- Distributed by: KRG Studios
- Release date: 21 February 2025
- Country: India
- Language: Kannada

Vishnu Priya is a 2025 Indian Kannada-language romantic drama film directed by V. K. Prakash, written by Ravi Srivatsa and produced by K. Manju. Set in the 1990s, the film's story is based on a real-life incident written by Sindhushree. The film stars Shreyas Manju and Priya Prakash Varrier, in her Kannada debut, in lead roles, along with Suchendra Prasad and Achyuth Kumar in key supporting roles.

The film's announcement following by the principal photography began in September 2019 in various parts of Karnataka. The musical score and soundtrack for the film is composed by Gopi Sundar in his second Kannada film after Vijayanand (2022). The cinematography and editing were handled by A. Vinod Bharathi and Suresh Urs respectively.

Vishnu Priya was released on 21 February 2025 after undergoing significant delays in post-production.

== Plot ==
Vishnu, emotionally guarded due to his father’s early death and his mother’s subsequent remarriage, grows up in a small town during the 1990s. Best friends since childhood with Balu (Balaji), their bond becomes strained when Balu confides that he loves Priya and asks Vishnu to convey his feelings. Instead, when Vishnu approaches Priya, she surprises both by expressing her love for Vishnu himself and not for Balu, leaving Vishnu torn between loyalty to his friend and his own emotions.

Over time, Vishnu and Priya’s romance blossoms amid the nostalgia of bus rides, handwritten notes, and campus canteens. Their relationship, however, is far from smooth: Balu’s quiet heartbreak fosters subtle resentment, Priya’s parents express disapproval, and Vishnu battles his own trust issues shaped by past wounds. Priya’s unwavering devotion contrasts with Vishnu’s reluctance, rooted in his belief that love cannot flourish without absolute trust. As the duo’s bond deepens, familial expectations and misunderstandings test their bond—leading to emotional confrontations and a temporary parting. Balu’s unspoken bitterness occasionally surfaces, threatening the harmony among the trio, but his actions stem more from sadness than malice. Vishnu eventually commits to Priya, recognizing that true love demands honesty and courage, while Priya continues to anchor their connection with patience and hope.

In the finale, Vishnu and Priya choose to stand together, overcoming societal pressures and reconciling with Balu, who accepts their love. The story concludes on a bittersweet yet hopeful note, portraying that enduring love, grounded in trust, can transcend misunderstandings, rivalry, and personal fear—reminding audiences of the purity of first love in simpler times.

== Cast ==
- Shreyas Manju as Vishnu
- Priya Prakash Varrier as Priya
- Suchendra Prasad as Priya's father
- Achyuth Kumar as Vishnu's father
- Sundar Raj
- Rajesh Rao
- K. S. Shridhar
- Nihal Raj
- Naveen D. Padil
- Ananth Padmanabh
- Vinod
- Ashwini Gowda
- Chithkala Biradar
- Saniha
- Ramya
- Master Vidath

== Soundtrack ==
The soundtrack consists of songs composed by Gopi Sundar marking his return to Kannada cinema after his debut in Vijayanand (2022). All the songs are written by V. Nagendra Prasad. The first single "Chiguru Chiguru" was released on . The audio rights were acquired by A2 Music label.

Track listing
No.	Title	Lyrics	Singer(s)	Length
1.	"Elu Girigala"	V. Nagendra Prasad	Harish Sivaramakrishnan	4:40
2.	"Summane Summane"	V. Nagendra Prasad	Priya Prakash Varrier, Akbar Khan	4:17
3.	"Kshana Kshana"	V. Nagendra Prasad	Sanjith Hegde	3:41
4.	"Chiguru Chiguru"	V. Nagendra Prasad	Najim Arshad	3:57
Total length:				17:33

== Reception ==
The movie received mixed reviews from critics. While some praised its nostalgic appeal and emotional depth, others criticized its slow pacing and formulaic narrative. Sridevi S from The Times of India described Vishnu Priya as a romantic drama with a predictable narrative but praised its nostalgic appeal and performances, noting its slow pacing as a drawback. A Sharadhaa of The New Indian Express called it a "90s love story that unfolds slowly but strikes deep," appreciating its emotional depth and retro charm, though noting its leisurely pace. Jagdish Angadi from Deccan Herald labeled the film a "formulaic romantic drama," critiquing its lack of originality but acknowledging its appeal to fans of traditional love stories. Y Maheshwara Reddy of Bangalore Mirror described Vishnu Priya as a "classic love flick," praising its adherence to traditional romantic tropes but noting it may feel dated for modern audiences.Times Now's Shashiprasad SM remarked that the film allows viewers to "relive the typical 1990s love story but at a snail’s pace," highlighting its nostalgic elements but criticizing its slow narrative.
