= Rudra Tandava =

- Theatrical release poster
- Directed by: Guru Deshpande
- Written by: Suseenthiran
- Screenplay by: Guru Deshpande
- Based on: Pandiya Naadu (2013) by Suseenthiran
- Produced by: S Vinod Kumar; Srinagesh
- Starring: Chiranjeevi Sarja; Radhika Kumaraswamy; Krishna; Girish Karnad; P. Ravi Shankar; Vasishta N. Simha
- Cinematography: Jagadish Vali
- Edited by: K. M. Prakash
- Music by: V. Harikrishna; D. Imman
- Production company: G Cinemas
- Distributed by: Magnum Pictures
- Release date: 27 February 2015
- Running time: 154 minutes
- Country: India
- Language: Kannada

Rudra Tandava (transl. Violent dance) is a 2015 Indian Kannada-language action film directed by Guru Deshpande, and is a remake of the 2013 Tamil film Pandiya Naadu. It stars Chiranjeevi Sarja and Radhika Kumaraswamy in the lead roles. P. Ravi Shankar, Girish Karnad and Krishna feature in supporting roles. The film tells the story about how Shivaraj (Sarja), a regular man avenges the killing of his brother by the local mafia. The film upon theatrical release on 27 February 2015 received mixed reviews from critics.

== Plot ==
Shivaraj, a carefree young man, is devastated when a gangster, Narasimha, kills his elder brother. When Narasimha is not arrested by the police, Shivaraj and his father vow to take revenge.

== Cast ==
- Chiranjeevi Sarja as Shivaraj
- Radhika Kumaraswamy as Jhanavi
- P. Ravi Shankar as Narasimha Reddy
- Girish Karnad as Girishanna
- Krishna (credited as Darling Krishna) as Kumar
- Kumar Govind as Nagaraj
- Chikkanna
- Babitha (Shruthi Raj)
- Vasishta N. Simha as Jagga
- Chithra Shenoy
- Malathi Sardeshpande
- Suresh Mangalore
- Lohithaswa
- Rockline Sudhakar

== Soundtrack ==
V. Harikrishna scored the film's background music and composed for its soundtrack, with its lyrics written by Dhananjay Adiga, Puneeth Arya and K. Kalyan. The soundtrack album consists of five tracks, and all the songs from Pandiya Naadu (composed by D. Imman) have been retained. The track "Try Try Try" was sung solo by actress Ramya Nambeesan, who made her debut in Kannada cinema as a playback singer with the song. The track "Ondooralli Obba" was sung by actor Puneeth Rajkumar, with the other three tracks sung by Shankar Mahadevan (two) and Rajesh Krishnan (one). The album was released in January 2015 in Bangalore.

No.	Title	Lyrics	Singer(s)	Length
1.	"Ee Baala Belago"	Dhananjay Adiga	Shankar Mahadevan
2.	"Ondooralli Obba"	Puneeth Arya	Puneeth Rajkumar
3.	"Yaare Yaare"	K. Kalyan	Rajesh Krishnan
4.	"Try Try Try"	K. Kalyan	Ramya Nambeesan
5.	"Shantha Shivane"	Dhananjay Adiga	Shankar Mahadevan

== Reception ==
=== Critical response ===
A Shardhha of The New Indian Express wrote "Though the storyline is not new, Guru has added elements to keep the audiences hooked and his effort shows". Shyam Prasad S of Bangalore Mirror wrote "storyline showing a realistic streak, it would have been better to showcase the fights in similar light. Chiru is bettering himself with each film and this film is his best showcase so far". Muralikrishna P from Vijaya Karnataka wrote "Jagdish Wali cinematography is noted in some scenes. But, the koala's sunshine rolls the eye of the spectator. Scenes are bleak. V. Harikrishna does not play music. There is no such Josh in prose songs such as the one he once had when he was a middle school teacher. The film fails to capture the audience". S Viswanath from Deccan Herald wrote "Till virtually first half, the film runs on this promising premise. Shivaraj, a timid mobile sales and services guy, wary of confronting baddies, stammers when it comes to convey his mind to school teacher Jhanavi, who, incidentally, happens to be his tenant. With a sidekick in tow, Deshpande believes this would suffice to take care of comic part".
