= Manasaare =

- Directed by: Yograj Bhat
- Screenplay by: Pawan Kumar
- Story by: Yogaraj Bhat
- Produced by: Rockline Venkatesh
- Starring: Diganth; Andrita Ray
- Cinematography: Satya Hegde
- Edited by: Joni Harsha
- Music by: Mano Murthy
- Production company: Rockline Productions
- Release date: 25 September 2009
- Country: India
- Language: Kannada

Manasaare is a 2009 Indian Kannada-language romantic psychological film directed by Yogaraj Bhat. It stars Diganth and Aindrita Ray in the lead roles. The film soundtrack and score was composed by Mano Murthy with lyrics by Yogaraj Bhat and veteran lyricist Jayant Kaikini.

== Plot ==
Manohar "Manu" (Diganth) is an orphaned, unemployed young man, who is often looked down on upon by his family. However, his uncle (Achyuth Kumar) is the only exception. His friend Satish (Sathish Ninasam) is a neighbour and cable operator, whose love for one of their neighhour - Bhamini, is unrequited. Bhamini marries a software engineer, and at the wedding reception, tells Manu that she loves him, but couldn't live with him (given his status). She also asks him to do something with his life, and not throw it away by spending his time criticizing the people around him. Meanwhile, Satish takes note of the "gulf" between Bhamini's new husband and himself, and decides to prove himself that he is indeed more worthy than she thinks of him. To that end, Manohar and Satish get together and invent a "electricity producing machine" which harnesses its power from vehicles that drive on roads (the fact that this isn't free energy, and that it would cost motorists who drive over it some extra fuel is not mentioned in the movie). His demonstration goes off well, but a police car chasing a criminal on a motorbike suddenly drives onto the machine, which causes the car to flip over, and in fact nearly kills the constables inside.

Manu and Satish are arrested and reprimanded for their foolishness, but they are soon released. Manu's aunt decides to marry him into a wealthy family, to get rid of him and an attempt to temper his behaviour. While they are visiting the intended's family, a baby next to Manu begins urinating. Manu takes a nearby tea-cup to catch the urine and prevent getting wet. Everyone sees this and his prior behavior as confirmation that he is mentally unstable. Manohar and Satish, both drunk, stop at an isolated hill top and tell one another their opinions about life; they get into a row. Satish drives off leaving behind Manohar.

Manohar walks back home and sees a van coming from a distance. The van is transporting about a dozen patients bound for an asylum. The inmates cause a commotion in the van, the guards loose order of the inmates' paperwork and photographs but the inmates are subdued by the guards. The van stops so that the guards can relieve themselves, and the patient Mahendra G. escapes. Manu was near the van when the guards went after the escapee. The guards notice him and take him as the escapee. Manohar is forcibly taken to the Kaamanabillu asylum.

At the asylum, Manohar demonstratively attempts to explain the mix-up but he is not believed. Soon, his family find out and go to remove him from the asylum. An altercation between Manohar and another inmate cause the family to rethink their decision to take him away because they believe he insane. So, they decide to leave him there. Manu's life is thrown out of gear, as he realizes that he has no choice but to live the life of a lunatic, although he is not. He settles down and starts bonding with the patients: Dollar (played by Pawan Kumar), who is a brilliant engineer, but considered a lunatic when one of his inventions, - a baby ass washing machine - injures a baby. He also bonds with Raju Thalikote, who is a self declared veteran of the asylum. Manu soon discloses his story to Shankrappa, who advises him to talk to Dollar, who in turn has always had an uncanny knack to escape from the asylum.

Soon, Manu manages to slip out, but during his escape, which takes him through the female wing of the asylum, he catches a glimpse of Devika (played by Aindrita Ray) and is smitten by her. Although he escapes, he changes his mind and returns to the asylum to pursue a relationship with her. As they are not allowed to mingle by the asylum staff, the inmates (under Shankrappa's leadership) hatch and execute a plan to allow Manu to meet Devika. Shankrappa is well aware of the doctors' tendency to perform the exact opposite to what he request them to do - since they perceive him to be insane - and he uses this to get them all sent for electro-shock therapy (since the EST room is within the women's wing). Dollar has manufactured a non-conducting gel which they then switch with the EST gel, so that they're not really affected by the shock. They fake syncope, and when the staff leave for a prayer assembly, they sneak out to meet Devika. It turns out that Devika is sleeping (having been given an illegal pill, by a doctor who, unbeknownst to everyone engages in (implied) sexual abuse of female inmates, using the pill). Nonetheless, Manu - with Shankrappa's assistance, carries Devika to an ambulance, and drives it out of the asylum.

Devika is a dental student who is in the asylum as she has cultivated intense misandry, after a lecturer misbehaved with her. This manifests itself as aggressive behaviour from time to time, where she stabs any man she deems dangerous. When she awakens the morning after being spirited away by Manu, she attacks him. However, Manu manages to subdue her and professes his love to her. Devika and Manu decide to return to the asylum. On the way, at Devika's insistence, they take a temporary detour to her childhood home, where Devika has a flashback - of her uncaring father (who drove her mother to suicide). They then proceed to the asylum, but stop for the night. Manu spouts a monologue of his love for her, once she sleeps - and this is recorded by a CCTV camera that was activated accidentally by Devika, when they had hit a bump in the road earlier. The next morning, she discovers this, but while waking up Manu, unintentionally scares and nearly kills him when he falls down a railway overbridge. Manu is angry, and is about to leave her to her own devices, when she laughs at his rant, and he is smitten again. As they continue on foot (the van having run out of fuel), even as Manu pleads with her to go back (and not to the hospital). She doesn't respond right up until they go to the hospital, and convinces Manu to re-enter it.

As their relationship reaches serious levels, Devika asks Manu point blank whether he is capable of cheating her, to which the latter replies in the negative. However, once the escaped inmate (Mahendra) is caught, and brought to the asylum by the police (Mahendra is a murderer), the staff realise their mix-up. However, in front of everyone, they accuse Manu of being complicit in the charade, so that he could enjoy a free ride at the hospital. Devika construes this as Manu's betrayal, and of the disingenuousness of his love, and spurns him. A shattered Manu is thrown out of the asylum, bidding a tearful farewell to his fellow inmates with whom he had developed a bond. As he leaves, he encounters Dollar (who had managed to finally escape) returning to the asylum, claiming that there was nothing in the world worth living for outside the asylum.

When he arrives at his uncle's place however, he is once again exposed to the ridicule of people.

The movie ends with Devika encountering him near his house. It is shown that she is cured of her dementia when she remembered Manu, who helped her to let go of her painful past, and move on; when she fought back the abusive doctor, and having watched the tape again, Devika is convinced that his love for her was real. The doctors have also concluded that Manu was responsible for "curing" Devika, and she says that is why she has returned to him; but Manu says that he himself is deemed to be uncured, and insane - being laughed at by society. Devika asks him, rather nonchalantly, as to how could that be his problem, and Manu comes around - with both of them pitying society, and walking away. The final scene closes with a voice-over, of a line that Shankrappa had delivered to Manu when the latter first arrived at the asylum - "Those in this world that come to an asylum, are those who can be cured. The ones who cannot be cured at all, remain outside. There's a chance that you'll be cured of madness, which is something that others outside don't have. Whoever comes here is only temporarily mad, but the ones on the outside are permanently so."

The movie has shades of "One flew over the Cuckoo's Nest", the conundrum illustrated in "Catch-22" and also shows the 'institutionalisation' depicted in "The Shawshank Redemption". The main thrust of the movie is to show the hypocrisy of a society which classifies behaviours, and, by extension, people into 'normal' and 'abnormal'.

== Cast ==
- Diganth as Mahendra / Manohar
- Aindrita Ray as Devika
- Neethu as Bhamini
- Achyuth Kumar as Manohar's uncle
- Raju Talikote as Shankarappa
- Balaji Manohar as psychiatrist
- Pawan Kumar as Dollar
- Manjunath Hegde as police inspector
- Sathish Ninasam as Cable operator Satish
- Ashok Rao as Kaamanabillu asylum superintendent
- Mithra as Indarjeet

== Soundtrack ==
Manasaare

Soundtrack album by Mano Murthy
- Genre: Film soundtrack
- Length: 26:18
- Label: Aditya Music

The soundtrack was composed by Mano Murthy.

Track listing
No.	Title	Lyrics	Singer(s)	Length
1.	"Ondu Kanasu"	Jayanth Kaikini	Kunal Ganjawala, Ananya Bhagat, Jayanth Kaikini	3:08
2.	"Kanna Haniyondige"	Yogaraj Bhat	KK, Shreya Ghoshal	5:09
3.	"Naa Naguva Modalene"	Yogaraj Bhat	Shreya Ghoshal	4:32
4.	"Ello Maleyaagidenu"	Jayanth Kaikini	Sonu Nigam	4:09
5.	"Naanu Manasare"	Yogaraj Bhat	Vikas Vasistha, Lakshmi Nagaraj	2:41
6.	"Sahanavavathu"		Vijay Prakash	2:55
7.	"Onde Ninna"	Jayanth Kaikini	Sonu Nigam	3:44

== Reception ==
=== Critical response ===
R G Vijayasarathy of Rediff.com scored the film at 3.5 out of 5 stars and says "Sathya Hegde, the cameraman and Mano Murthy, the music composer. Hegde goes to the deep, inaccessible corners of Madikeri, Karwar and other places to add lot of visual strength to the movie. Hats off to Mano Murthy for his superb music. Manasaare is a must-watch for all Kannada film viewers who are tired of watching a series of remakes and eagerly waiting for original stories". A critic from Deccan Herald wrote "The director takes care that this doesn’t happen but cannot pump up the film’s pace, held down by a couple of songs and scenes. The film has a sudden end and does not touch the viewer. Then again, ‘Manasaare’ may not be everybody's cup of tea". A critic from Bangalore Mirror wrote "The best things in the film are the dialogues, camera work (Sathya Hegde), lyrics by Jayanth Kaikini (even though it is still about rain) and music by Mano Murthy (that still sounds like the rain and showers you have heard before). Bhat’s inspirations come from various old sources, but that is not enough to beef up this film". A critic from The New Indian Express scored the film at three-and-a-half out of five stars and wrote "The editing and art work add strength to the movie. "Ello Maleyaagidhe Endhu", "Kanna Haniyondhige Kenne Maathaadidhe" and "Naa Naguva Modalene" are superb compositions. The fantastic visuals, melodious music and Yogaraj Bhat's dialogues are the high points of Manasaare".

== Box office ==
The movie was the one of the biggest hits of the year 2009.

== Awards ==
Filmfare Awards

- Filmfare Award for Best Lyricist - Kannada - Jayant Kaikini - "Yello Maleyaagide"

South Scope Awards

- Best Film
- Best Director
- Best Actress
- Best Lyricist
