= John Jani Janardhan (2016 film) =

- Directed by: Guru Deshpande
- Written by: Bibin George, Vishnu Unnikrishnan
- Produced by: L. Padmanabh; K. Girish; C.N.Shashikiran
- Starring: Ajay Rao; Yogesh; Krishna; Kamna Ranawat
- Cinematography: Santhosh Rai Pathaje
- Edited by: K. M. Prakash
- Music by: Arjun Janya
- Production company: M. R. Pictures
- Release date: 9 December 2016
- Country: India
- Language: Kannada

John Jani Janardhan is a 2016 Kannada comedy drama film directed by Guru Deshpande. It features Ajay Rao, Yogesh and Krishna in the lead roles, while the debutant Kamna Ranawat feature as the female lead. It also features actress Malashri in an important role. The film is the official remake of the successful Malayalam film Amar Akbar Anthony (2015) which was directed by Nadirshah. The film's musical score and songs are by Arjun Janya.

The film released on 9 December 2016 across Karnataka.

== Cast ==
- Ajay Rao as Janardhan
- Yogesh as Jani
- 'Madarangi' Krishna as John
- Kamna Ranawat
- Malashri as Policewoman
- M. S. Umesh
- Vaijanath Biradar
- Girija Lokesh
- Tennis Krishna
- Gurunandan
- Srinivasa Murthy
- Bank Janardhan
- Ravishankar Gowda
- Prashanth Siddi
- Bank Janardhan
- Chitra Shenoy
- Yashwanth Shetty
- Jayashree Raj
- Dia
- Sanketh Kashi
- Lakshmidevi
- Aindrita Ray as an item number

== Production ==
In early April 2016, the film was announced by Guru Deshpande who was working simultaneously on other two scripts. It was announced that he is gearing up for a third film which was a multi-starrer comedy. Earlier it was reported that the reformed don Muthappa Rai would produce the film under his home banner. Later it was revealed that he would only be presenting the film and not producing. After having roped in the three male lead roles, the makers browsed through many profiles to select the female lead. The search ended with the makers signing in Mumbai based model Kamna Ranawat to make her debut through this film. Although skeptical about Malashri's consent to star in the film for an important character role, the producers were surprised to have got her nod to play the role. Actress Aindrita Ray was roped in to dance for a special song alongside all the three male leads.

The film was officially launched in May 2016 and the shoot was completed by 30 July 2016.

== Soundtrack ==
John Jani Janardhan

Soundtrack album by Arjun Janya
- Released: 3 October 2016
- Recorded: 2016
- Genre: Feature film soundtrack
- Length: 19:19
- Label: Jhankar Music

The film's score and soundtrack was composed by Arjun Janya. The soundtrack album consists of five tracks. Lyrics for the tracks were penned by Chandan Shetty, Guru Deshpande, Alemari Santhu, A. P. Arjun, K. Kalyan and Chethan. A rap number was included in the album titled "Kannada Kaliyale" ("A Aa E Ee"), which the team hoped could encourage youngsters to speak Kannada language. The song, written by Chandan Shetty, features all the three male leads on screen. The distribution rights of the album were given to Jhankar Music.

No.	Title	Lyrics	Singer(s)	Length
1.	"A Aa E Ee"	Chandan Shetty, Guru Deshpande	Chandan Shetty	2:33
2.	"Hudugeer Hudugeer"	Alemari Santhu	Vijay Prakash	4:16
3.	"Roomige Ondhu"	A. P. Arjun	Vijay Prakash, Hemanth Kumar	3:59
4.	"Onde Thayi Makkalu"	K. Kalyan	Shreya Jaydeep	4:23
5.	"John Jani Janardhan"	Chethan	Benny Dayal	4:08
6.	"Preetiya Paarivala" (not included in album)
Total length:				19:19
