= Vasishta N. Simha =

Indian actor

- Born: Vasishta N Simha; 19 October 1988 (age 37); Hassan, Karnataka, India
- Other names: Simha, Vashishta, Chitte
- Occupations: Actor; singer
- Years active: 2013–present
- Spouse: Hariprriya (m. 2023)

Vasishta N. Simha (born 19 October 1988) is an Indian actor and playback singer who predominantly works in Kannada, Telugu and Tamil films. He gained recognition for his portrayal of Kamal in the KGF film series (2018–2022) and is known for portraying antagonist, character and lead roles. His other notable films include Raja Huli, Godhi Banna Sadharana Mykattu, Tagaru, Salaar: Part 1 – Ceasefire and Love Li.

== Career ==
In 2011, Vasishta quit his job as a software engineer and decided to enter the film industry as an actor. He initially worked on an unreleased film titled Hubballi Hudagaru, before having his first release with Arya's Love (2013). He subsequently made a breakthrough with his role as the main antagonist in Raja Huli (2013), a remake of the Tamil film, Sundarapandian (2012). He later also appeared in Rudra Tandava (2014), a remake of the Tamil film Pandiya Naadu (2013).

Vasishta then appeared in JKS's bilingual film, Alone, in a leading role alongside Nikesha Patel. Portraying the male lead, the actor managed to get an introduction into the Tamil film industry and the film won mixed reviews. He made his Telugu film debut with the film Narappa in 2021. In KGF, Vasishta played the role of Bangalore-based gangster Kamal, one of the major antagonists in the film.

== Filmography ==
Year	Film	Role	Language	Notes
2013	Arya's Love		Kannada	
2013	Raja Huli	Jagga	Kannada	
2015	Rudra Tandava		Kannada	
2015	Alone	Lighthouse John / Ram	Kannada	
2016	Karai Oram	Lighthouse John / Ram	Tamil	
2016	Nan Love Track	Raaj	Kannada	
2016	Godhi Banna Sadharana Mykattu	Ranga	Kannada	
2016	Sundaranga Jaana	Ajay	Kannada	
2017	Upendra Matte Baa	Vasishta	Kannada	
2017	Mufti	Kashi	Kannada	
2017	Dayavittu Gamanisi	Proxy	Kannada	
2018	Tagaru	Chitte	Kannada	
2018	Yogi Duniya		Kannada	
2018	K.G.F: Chapter 1	Kamal	Kannada	
2018	8MM Bullet	Karthik	Kannada	
2019	Kavacha	Vasudeva	Kannada	
2020	India vs England	Kanishka	Kannada	
2020	Mayabazar 2016	Raji	Kannada	
2021	Narappa	Seenappa	Telugu	
2021	Nayeem Dairies	Nayeem	Telugu	
2021	Yuvarathnaa		Kannada	
2022	K.G.F: Chapter 2	Kamal	Kannada	Cameo appearance
2022	Dear Vikram	Bharat	Kannada	
2022	Odela Railway Station	Tirupati	Telugu	
2022	Head Bush	Kothwal Ramachandra	Kannada	
2022	Namma Hudugaru		Kannada	
2023	Yadha Yadha Hi	ACP Aditya Varma	Kannada	
2023	Salaar: Part 1 – Ceasefire		Telugu	Kannada dubbing
2023	Devil: The British Secret Agent	Samudra / Agent Trojan	Telugu	
2024	Love Li	Jai	Kannada	
2024	Yevam	Yugandhar	Telugu	
2024	Simbaa	Anurag	Telugu	
2024	Bhairathi Ranagal		Kannada	
2025	Odela 2	Tirupati	Telugu	
2025	Tribanadhari Barbarik	Ram	Telugu	
2026	Wolf		Tamil	
2026	Kajja	Cameo	Tulu	
2026	Kaalachakra		Kannada	Upcoming
2026	Talwarpete		Kannada	Upcoming
2026	Kadal Kote		Kannada	Filming
2026	VIP		Kannada	Upcoming
2026	Ira		Kannada	Upcoming

== Discography ==
=== As playback singer ===
Year	Work	Song	Composer	Notes
2016	Kirik Party	"Neecha Sullu Sutho Naalige"	B. Ajaneesh Loknath	
2017	Dayavittu Gamanisi	"Marete Hodenu (unplugged)"	Anoop Seelin	
2018	Kirrak Party	"Neechamaina"	B. Ajaneesh Loknath	Telugu film
2018	6ne Maili	"6ne Maili Title Track"	Sai Kiran	
2018	Dhwaja	"Dhwaja"	Santhosh Narayanan	
2020	Gentleman	"Nadugutide"	B. Ajaneesh Loknath	
2021	Ramarjuna	"Bloodshed of Ramarjuna"	Anand Rajavikram	
2024	Abbabba	"Odu Odu"	Deepak Alexander	

== Awards and nominations ==
Work	Award	Ceremony	Result	Ref
Godhi Banna Sadharana Mykattu	2nd IIFA Utsavam	Best Actor in a Negative Role	Won	
Godhi Banna Sadharana Mykattu	6th SIIMA Awards	Best Actor in a Negative Role	Won	
Godhi Banna Sadharana Mykattu	64th Filmfare Awards South	Best Supporting Actor	Won	
Dayavittu Gamanisi	65th Filmfare Awards South	Best Supporting Actor	Nominated	
Dayavittu Gamanisi	7th SIIMA Awards	Best Supporting Actor	Nominated	
Tagaru	8th SIIMA Awards	Best Supporting Actor	Nominated	
Mayabazar 2016	10th SIIMA Awards	Best Supporting Actor	Nominated	
