= Aindrita Ray =

Indian actress

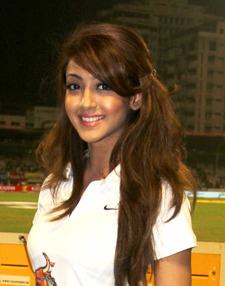
- Ray during the promotion of Manasaare
- Born: 19 April; Udaipur, Rajasthan, India
- Occupations: Actress; model
- Years active: 2008–present
- Spouse: Diganth (m. 2018)

Aindrita Ray (born 19 April) is an Indian actress who primarily works in Kannada film's alongside Bengali and Hindi films. Ray is a recipient of two South Indian International Movie Awards, and was considered as one of famous and leading actress of her time in kannada industry. Ray also has five nominations for Filmfare Awards South.

Ray made her acting debut in 2007, with Meravanige. She had her breakthrough with Manasaare (2010), for which she received the Filmfare Award for Best Actress – Kannada nomination. Ray received two more Filmfare Best Actress nomination for her performance in Veera Parampare (2010) and Bhajarangi (2013). For the last of these, she won the SIIMA Award for Best Actress – Kannada. Her other successful films are Paramathma (2011), Mungaru Male 2 (2016), Chowka (2017), Premam Poojyam (2021), Kshamisi Nimma Khaatheyalli Hanavilla (2022) and Thimayya & Thimayya (2022).

== Early life and background ==
Ray was born on 19 April as the youngest daughter into a Bengali family in Udaipur, Rajasthan, where she spent her childhood, before moving to Mumbai. With her father, A. K. Ray, being a prosthodontist in the Indian Air Force, she along with her family moved from one place to another, finally settling in Bangalore.

Ray studied at Baldwin Girls' High School, Bangalore. Later, she joined MR Ambedkar Dental College, Bangalore to pursue a bachelor's degree in dental science. While studying, she did parttime modelling, appearing in television advertisements, which paved way for her entry into the film industry. She started acting in Kannada movies, and once in a while appearing in Amateur/Short films.

== Career ==
=== Debut and breakthrough (2008-2010) ===
Ray trained under fashion choreographer M. S. Sreedhar. She appeared first on-screen in a song in the 2006 Kannada film Jackpot. Ray began her acting career in the 2008 film Meravanige, playing Nandini, opposite Prajwal Devaraj. The film received a success at the box office, with Rediff.com praising her performance, dance and adding that she makes a mark "effectively".

Ray had four releases in 2009. She first played Padma in Junglee, opposite Duniya Vijay and then played Divya opposite Chiranjeevi Sarja in Vayuputra. Her final film that year, Manasaare, proved to be her breakthrough. Her portrayal of a mentally challenged girl, Devika opposite Diganth won her the Suvarna Film Award for Best Actress, along with nomination for Filmfare Award for Best Actress – Kannada. A critic from Deccan Herald stated: "Aindrita with less dialogue, and easy on the eye, manages to emote well with her eyes and smile."

In her first film of 2010, Ray played Drushti opposite Santhosh Aryan in Nooru Janmaku. She then played Sanjana in Nannavanu, opposite Prajwal Devaraj. Veera Parampare was her only successful film that year, where she played Sapna, a village chief daughter opposite Sudeepa. The film earned her another Filmfare for the Best Actress nomination. Shruti Indira Lakshminarayana noted that Ray gets to her "bubbly self" and performs well.

=== Recent works ===
After a series of flops, Ray was cast in the supporting role in the Puneeth Rajkumar starrer Paramathma. She was widely acclaimed by the critics for her obsessive character role. She was also noticed by the critics in Dhool. The other films, Manasina Maathu and Kaanchana, failed at the box office.

In 2012, she starred in Parijatha, opposite Diganth, which found moderate success. Her other films include Tony, with Srinagara Kitty in the lead and Rajani Kantha, with Duniya Vijay.

In 2014, she made her Bengali film debut with Bachchan, opposite Jeet and directed by Raja Chanda, which incidentally was a remake of the Kannada movie Vishnuvardhana.

In 2017, Ray appeared in Raja Chanda's Bengali film Amar Aponjon, alongside Soham Chakraborty, Priyanka Sarkar and Subhashree Ganguly.

In 2021, she is appearing in Hardik Gajjar's Hindi feature film Bhavai opposite Pratik Gandhi, releasing in theatres on 1 October.

== Personal life ==
Ray met actor Diganth Manchale on the sets of Manasaare in 2008, and they eventually started dating. After 10 years of courtship, Ray and Diganth got married on 12 December 2018, in a traditional Bengali wedding ceremony, at Nandi Hills, Karnataka.

== Media image ==
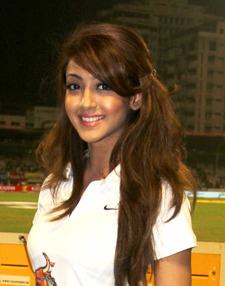
Ray at the Celebrity Cricket League event in 2013

Ray was placed first in Rediff.com 's "Top 5 Kannada Actress" list of 2009. In Bangalore Times Most Desirable Women list, Ray was placed 5th in 2012, 19th in 2014 and 7th in 2016, 6th in 2018, 7th in 2019 and 9th in 2020. In 2024, Ray and Diganth along with PETA, donated a mechanical elephant to a temple in Mysuru.

== Filmography ==
=== Films ===
| † | Denotes films that have not yet been released |

| Year | Title | Role | Language | Notes | Ref. |
|---|---|---|---|---|---|
| 2006 | Jackpot | Herself | Kannada | Special appearance in song "Laila Chingaari Laila" | |
| 2008 | Meravanige | Nandini "Nandu" | Kannada | | |
| 2008 | Mast Maja Maadi | Herself | Kannada | Special appearance in song "Shakalaka Bhoom" | |
| 2009 | Junglee | Padma | Kannada | | |
| 2009 | Vayuputra | Divya | Kannada | | |
| 2009 | Love Guru | Herself | Kannada | Cameo appearance | |
| 2009 | Manasaare | Devika | Kannada | | |
| 2010 | Nooru Janmaku | Drushti | Kannada | | |
| 2010 | Nannavanu | Sanjana | Kannada | | |
| 2010 | Veera Parampare | Pooja | Kannada | | |
| 2010 | A Flat | Karan's wife | Hindi | Uncredited role | |
| 2011 | Manasina Maathu | Sahana | Kannada | | |
| 2011 | Dhool | Sapna | Kannada | | |
| 2011 | Paramathma | Saanvi | Kannada | | |
| 2012 | Parijatha | Chandrika | Kannada | | |
| 2012 | Prem Adda | Herself | Kannada | Special appearance in song "Basanthi" | |
| 2013 | Rajani Kantha | Priya | Kannada | | |
| 2013 | Ziddi | Sahana | Kannada | | |
| 2013 | Kaddipudi | Daisy | Kannada | Cameo appearance | |
| 2013 | Tony | Pammi | Kannada | | |
| 2013 | Bhajarangi | Geetha | Kannada | | |
| 2014 | Athi Aparoopa | Aparna | Kannada | | |
| 2014 | Bachchan | Priya | Bengali | | |
| 2015 | Sharp Shooter | Herself | Kannada | Special appearance in song "Kuntebille" | |
| 2016 | Mungaru Male 2 | Shreya | Kannada | | |
| 2016 | John Jani Janardhan | Herself | Kannada | Special appearance in song "Preetiya Paarivala" | |
| 2016 | Niruttara | Shravya | Kannada | | |
| 2017 | Chowka | Pushpa | Kannada | | |
| 2017 | Melkote Manja | Parvathi | Kannada | | |
| 2017 | Amar Aponjon | Sayoni | Bengali | credited as Aindrita | |
| 2018 | Raambo 2 | Herself | Kannada | Special appearance in song "Dumm Maaro Dumm" | |
| 2019 | Main Zaroor Aaunga | Lisa Malhotra | Hindi | | |
| 2021 | Bhavai | Rani | Hindi | | |
| 2021 | Premam Poojyam | Joyitha | Kannada | | |
| 2022 | Kshamisi Nimma Khaatheyalli Hanavilla | Padmavathi | Kannada | | |
| 2022 | Garuda | Anu | Kannada | | |
| 2022 | Judaa Hoke Bhi | Meera Khanna | Hindi | | |
| 2022 | Thimayya & Thimayya | Jyothsana "Jyo" | Kannada | | |
| 2024 | Bachelor Party | | Kannada | Special appearance | |

=== Web series ===
| Year | Title | Role | Notes | Ref. |
|---|---|---|---|---|
| 2020 | The Casino | Camilla Khurana | | |
| 2021 | Sanak - Ek Junoon | Ragini Purohit | | |

=== Music videos ===
| Year | Song | Singer | Ref. |
|---|---|---|---|
| 2021 | "3 Peg" | Chandan Shetty | |

== Awards and nominations ==
| Year | Film | Award | Category | Result | Ref. |
|---|---|---|---|---|---|
| 2010 | Manasaare | Suvarna Film Awards | Best Actress | Won | |
| 2010 | Manasaare | South Scope Awards | Best Actress – Kannada | Won | |
| 2010 | Manasaare | Filmfare Awards South | Best Actress – Kannada | Nominated | |
| 2011 | Veera Parampare | Filmfare Awards South | Best Actress – Kannada | Nominated | |
| 2011 | Veera Parampare | Suvarna Film Awards | Best Actress | Nominated | |
| 2012 | Paramathma | Filmfare Awards South | Best Supporting Actress – Kannada | Nominated | |
| 2012 | Paramathma | South Indian International Movie Awards | Best Supporting Actress – Kannada | Won | |
| 2014 | Bhajarangi | South Indian International Movie Awards | Best Actress – Kannada | Won | |
| 2014 | Bhajarangi | Filmfare Awards South | Best Actress – Kannada | Nominated | |
| 2017 | Niruttara | Filmfare Awards South | Best Supporting Actress – Kannada | Nominated | |
