= Ek Love Ya =

2022 Indian Kannada-language romantic thriller film

- Theatrical release poster
- Directed by: Prem
- Written by: Prem
- Produced by: Rakshita
- Starring: Abhishek Rao; Reeshma Nanaiah; Rachita Ram
- Cinematography: Mahendra Simha
- Edited by: Srinivas P. Babu
- Music by: Arjun Janya
- Production company: Rakshita Film Factory
- Release date: 24 February 2022
- Running time: 152 minutes
- Country: India
- Language: Kannada

Ek Love Ya is a 2022 Indian Kannada-language romantic action film directed by Prem and produced by Rakshita under Rakshita Film Factory. The film stars debutants Raanna and Reeshma Nanaiah, alongside Rachita Ram, Ankita Naik, Shashi Kumar, Suchendra Prasad and Charan Raj. The music was composed by Arjun Janya, while the cinematography and editing were handled by Mahendra Simha and Srinivas P Babu respectively.

== Plot ==
Amar is a young man, who wants to fulfil his father Shankar's dream of becoming a lawyer. Years later, Amar becomes an alcoholic lawyer working for famous criminal lawyer named CH Vishwanath and meets Swati, a junior lawyer and Vishwanath's daughter.

A flashback reveals that Amar had loved his childhood girlfriend Anitha, but she left him without any reason, thus Amar wants to kill her. However, It is revealed that Anitha actually loved Amar, but sacrificed her love due to Shankar's request as Shankar didn't want Amar's career-ambition to be spoiled due to Amar's love for Anitha. When Anitha is mysteriously thrown from a under-construction building and is in coma, the officials pinpoint Amar, who is arrested by the police and is awaiting punishment from the court. Shankar reveals about Anitha's sacrifice which leaves Amar heartbroken and makes him realize his mistake about misjudging Anitha.

The next day at the court, Amar escapes from the cops and seeks his friends and Swathi's help to sneak Anitha out of the hospital. They embark on an investigation and check the CCTV footage with Swati's help where they find Amar's friend Daisy, who is a sex worker and enquires her only to learn that the culprit was at the hotel, They check the Hotel manager who arrives at the resident named Ramesh's house, who booked the hotel's room but finds Ramesh, along with Daisy dead. They also enquire Anitha and Amar's common friend Sheela where they learn that Anitha wanted to meet Amar for reconciliation, but was too late as the culprit had sent her to coma by pushing her from construction site.

They enquire a wedding videographer who was at the hotel and finds that Anitha was waiting for her. Sheela calls Amar to reveal that the culprit has arrived. Amar arrives at Sheela's house and produces the culprit to the court where the culprit reveals himself as Lakshman and accepts his misdeeds where Amar is exonerated from the charges and is proven innocent. While leaving for the prison, Lakshman is shot dead by Anitha's father. Amar calls Vishwanath to have a chit-chat where Amar reveals that the culprit was actually a scapegoat and reveals that Vishwanath's son Arjun is the main culprit. Vishwanath had learnt about Arjun's misdeeds and is determined to protect him and blamed Amar for the murder and ask the culprit to finish off the eyewitnesses, who knows about his son including Anitha.

When Vishwanath ask about Arjun, Amar tells him that he killed Arjun and thrown his body in a dumping yard, thus avenging Anitha's injustice. Swathi, learning of Vishwanath and Arjun's misdeeds is disgusted and begins to loathe them. The film ends with Amar living with his friends in their hill house and is seen talking to Anitha (though she is mentally unstable).

== Cast ==
- Raanna as Amar
- Reeshma Nanaiah as Anitha
- Rachita Ram as Swathi
- Ankita Naik as Daisy, a sex worker
- Shashi Kumar as Shankar, Amar's father
- Suchendra Prasad as Anitha's father
- Charan Raj as Adv. CH Vishwanath, Arjun and Swathi's father
- Cockroach Sudhi as "Couple" Raghu
- Sooraj as Amar's friend
- Nidhi as Sheela, Anitha and Amar's friend

=== Cameo appearance ===
- Rakshita in the song "Yennegu Hennigu"
- Prem in the song "Yennegu Hennigu"
- Arjun Gowda as Arjun, Vishwanath's son and Swathi's brother

== Release ==
Although initially anticipating to release in early to mid 2020, Prem has delayed the release due to health issues of Janya and the COVID-19 pandemic in India. It was rescheduled for 21 January 2022, but was postponed again to 24 February 2022.

== Soundtrack ==
Ek Love Ya

Soundtrack album by Arjun Janya
- Released: 24 February 2022
- Genre: Feature film soundtrack
- Language: Kannada
- Label: A2 Music
- Producer: Arjun Janya
External audio
- Official Audio Jukebox (Kannada) on YouTube

The soundtrack is composed by Arjun Janya, and is being released in Kannada, Telugu, Tamil, and Malayalam.

Kannada tracklist
No.	Title	Lyrics	Singer(s)	Length
1.	"Yaare Yaare"	Prem	Armaan Malik	3:22
2.	"Helu Yaake"	Prem	Prem	3:12
3.	"Yennegu Hennigu"	Prem	Mangli, Kailash Kher	3:37
4.	"Ondu Oorali"	Sharanakumar Gajendragada	Shankar Mahadevan	3:46
5.	"Meet Madana Illa Date Madana"	Vijay Eshwar	Aishwarya Rangarajan	3:41
6.	"Edebaditha Joragide"	Manjunath BS	Prem, Anuradha Bhat	4:18
7.	"Matthe Nodabeda"	Vijay Eshwar	Sonu Nigam, Saindhavi	4:22

Telugu tracklist
No.	Title	Lyrics	Singer(s)	Length
1.	"Yaare Yaare"	Prem, Rakendu Mouli	Sanjith Hegde	3:22
2.	"Kaalaanni Marachi"	Prem, Rakendu Mouli	Anudeep Dev	3:13
3.	"Mandaina Maguvaina"		Mangli, Saketh Komanduri	3:37

Tamil tracklist
No.	Title	Lyrics	Singer(s)	Length
1.	"Yaaro Yaaro"	Prem, Rathan Chandrashekar	Sanjith Hegde	3:22
2.	"Thappennadi Thappu"	Prem, Rathan Chandrashekar	Nakul Abhyankar	3:13
3.	"Ponnukkum Thannikkum"		Saicharan Bhaskaruni, Sahiti Chaganti	3:40

Malayalam tracklist
No.	Title	Lyrics	Singer(s)	Length
1.	"Aroo Aroo"	Prem, Rathan Chandrashekar	Sanjith Hegde	3:22
2.	"Thettenthadi Thettu"	Prem, Rathan Chandrashekar	Yazin Nizar	3:13
3.	"Penninum Kallinum"		Saicharan Bhaskaruni, Sahiti Chaganti	3:37

== Reception ==
=== Critical response ===
Sunayana Suresh of The Times of India gave 3.5/5 stars and wrote "The film is definitely worth a watch for those who love commercial cinema. It could have been edgier had it been shorter and more tightly woven." A. Sharadhaa of The New Indian Express gave 3.5/5 stars and wrote "With lovely locales and a colourful vibe to the proceedings, it is clear that Ek Love Ya has rich production qualities. However, the film’s length does not work for the film, but the romantic drama with a solid twist is definitely a one-time watch." Vivek M. V. of Deccan Herald gave 2/5 stars and wrote "'Ek Love Ya' is a disappointment for serious commercial cinema lovers."
