= Veera Parampare =

2010 film by S. Narayan

- Film poster
- Directed by: S. Narayan
- Written by: S. Narayan
- Produced by: S. Narayan
- Starring: Ambareesh; Sudeepa; Aindrita Ray
- Cinematography: R. Giri
- Edited by: P. R. Soundarraj
- Music by: Songs:S. Narayan; Score: Dharma Vish
- Release date: 29 October 2010
- Country: India
- Language: Kannada
- Budget: ₹5 crore (US$520,000)

Veera Parampare (lit. 'Heroic heritage') is a 2010 Indian Kannada-language action drama film written, produced and directed by S.Narayan under his home banner. The film stars Ambareesh, Sudeepa and Aindritha Ray in the lead roles. Narayan also composed music for the film. The film was dubbed in Hindi as Nafrat Ki Aandhi in 2014.

== Plot ==
Teja is the adopted son of Varade Gowda, a village chieftain and demigod in the village, who is fighting for the villagers' rights to prevent their land getting usurped by industrialists. However, Teja and Varade Gowda have to face a rivalry with Nanche Gowda's son Bhaire Gowda, whose father was killed by Varade Gowda years ago for usurping the farmers' lands and is still continuing to usurp the land. Sapna, Varade Gowda's second daughter, falls for Teja, who later reciprocates her feelings.

One day, Varade Gowda's first daughter Gowri, marries a boy, and is thrown out of the house. Later, Teja finds out that Gowri has attempted suicide. While he visits her at the hospital, he learns that her boyfriend had duped her. Gowri requests Teja to make Varade Gowda perform her funeral, to which he reluctantly agrees. Teja manages to make Varade Gowda perform her funeral, without the latter's knowledge. After this, the police arrest Teja for Gowri's disappearance, while Varade Gowda also berates him. After Teja's arrest, a drunkard reveals Teja's innocence, and Varade Gowda heads to the court to arrange a bail for Teja, but Bhaire Gowda's men attack Varade Gowda.

However, Varade Gowda manages to escape and gets admitted to the hospital. It is later revealed that Gowri's boyfriend is actually the son of Nanche Gowda's henchmen, who was also responsible for Teja's father's death (The man was actually killed by Teja in his childhood) and wanted to take revenge against Varade Gowda and Teja. Bhaire Gowda also supports him and planned everything to ruin Varade Gowda's family by separating Gowri and Teja. In the police custody, Teja learns from an officer that Bhaire Gowda has planned to eliminate Varade Gowda in the hospital. Enraged, Teja escapes from custody and reaches the hospital, where Teja, along with recovered Varade Gowda, defeats Bhaire Gowda and Gowri's boyfriend. After this, Teja reunites with Varade Gowda.

== Cast ==
- Ambareesh as Varade Gowda
- Sudeepa as Teja
- Aindritha Ray as Sapna, Varade Gowda's daughter in law
- Vijayalakshmi Singh as Almelu, Varade Gowda's wife
- Shobharaj as Teja's father
- Sharan as Sunil
- BV Bhaskar
- Hemashree

== Production ==
The film started its regular shooting from 2 April in Gokak, Bijapur and nearby places.

== Soundtrack ==
The music for the film has been composed by the director S. Narayan himself. He has also penned down the lyrics for the soundtracks.

Track#	Song	Singer(s)
1	"Tangaaliyalli Teli Hode"	Karthik, Shreya Ghoshal
2	"Yethathalo Maaya"	Shankar Mahadevan
3	"Moodal Seeme"	Vijay Prakash, Anuradha Bhat
4	"Ayyayyyo"	Suzanne D'Mello, Akash Talapatra
5	"Ambaradaa"	Milli Nair
6	"Nanna Mannidu"	Shankar Mahadevan

== Critical reception ==
The film received mixed reviews from critics.

Rediff wrote "Veera Parampare has nothing extraordinary or new to offer, but Ambareesh and Sudeep fans won't be disappointed".

== Awards and nominations ==
58th Filmfare Awards South :-

- Best Actress - Kannada - Nominated - Aindrita Ray
- Best Supporting Actor - Kannada - Nominated - Ambareesh

Suvarna Film Awards :-

- Best Actress - Nominated - Aindrita Ray
