= Alone (2015 Kannada film) =

2015 Indian film by JKS

- Theatrical release poster in Kannada
- Directed by: JKS
- Written by: JKS
- Produced by: L. Ananth; Ramalingaiah
- Starring: Simran; Nikesha Patel; Ineya; Vasishta N. Simha; Ganesh Prasad
- Cinematography: Jai Anand
- Edited by: Srikanth
- Music by: Sujith Shetty
- Production company: RJ Combainess
- Release dates: 27 November 2015 (Kannada); 1 January 2016 (Tamil)
- Country: India
- Languages: Kannada; Tamil

Alone is a 2015 Indian romantic thriller film directed by JKS. It was simultaneously shot in Kannada and Tamil with the latter version titled Karaioram (transl. Seaside). The film stars Simran, Nikesha Patel, Ineya, Vasishta N. Simha and Ganesh Prasad in lead roles. The Kannada version of the film was released in November 2015, while the Tamil film was released in January 2016. The film is inspired by Half Light (2006).

== Plot ==
The film commences with Priya troubled by her recent past, embarking on a vacation to Mangalore. She observes John riding a horse along the shoreline. Priya is captivated by John's charisma and vitality, capturing several photographs of him riding a horse on the seashore. She cannot resist her attraction to John, becomes curious about him, and ultimately meets him. Over time, they progressively develop a friendship and ultimately fall in love. They both resolve to confess their love for one another and arrange to meet at a designated location and time.

While en route to meet John, Priya encounters an elderly couple residing adjacent to her vacation house. Upon viewing the photograph of John, they disclose that he has been deceased for many years and recommend that she confirm this information with the police and their records. Priya continues to meet him and, to her astonishment, discovers John waiting; she then recounts to him the narrative shared by the elderly couple.

== Cast ==
| Cast (Kannada) | Cast (Tamil) | Role (Kannada) | Role (Tamil) |
|---|---|---|---|
| Simran | | Police Inspector Anjali (guest appearance) | Police Inspector Anjali (guest appearance) |
| Nikesha Patel | | Priya | Priya |
| Ineya | | Ramya | Ramya |
| Vasistha | | Lighthouse John and Ram | Lighthouse John and Ram |
| Ganesh Prasad | | Arun | Arun |
| Bullet Prakash | Manobala (Uncredited) | Inspector | Inspector P. Muthu Raj |
| Tabla Nani | Singampuli (Uncredited) | Constables | "Vettukili" Karunakaran |
| Dileep | Bullet Prakash | Constables | Mani Murugan |
| | Dileep | Accused | Accused |
| Shanthamma | | Priya's grandmother | Priya's grandmother |
| Mangaluru Suresh | | Priya's grandfather | Priya's grandfather |
| Anantha Velu | | Police Officer | I. Thiyagarajan |
| Jennifer Antony | | Dr. Sunanda | Dr. Sunanda |
| Radha Ravi (Uncredited) | | Ramya's father | Ramya's father |

== Production ==
The film was announced in September 2014 to be a Kannada horror film titled Alone, but subsequently developed into a multilingual venture. Nikesha Patel was signed to play the lead role, while Kamna Jethmalani was considered for another role. Kamna was later replaced by Ineya for the second leading female role by the launch ceremony of the film. Vasishta N. Simha was revealed to be playing a leading role.

In April 2015, Simran was signed on to portray a police officer in the film, and was revealed to be making a guest appearance. Sunil Shetty also reportedly worked on the film, making a special appearance as a CBI officer, but later pulled out of the commitment. Reports also emerged of a rift between actresses Nikesha Patel and Ineya during the making of the film. The Telugu version titled Leela is yet to release.

== Soundtrack ==
Songs by Sujith Shetty.

Kannada

- "Nille Nille Nee Nille" - Sujeet Shetty, Kushboo Jain
- "Hey Mayajala Mayajalavo" - Tanya
- "Hathira Hathira" - Kushboo Jain
- "Padhe Padhe" - Kusboo Jain

== Release and reception ==
The Kannada version of the film, Alone, had a theatrical release during November 2015 and won mixed reviews. The Tamil version of the film was released on 1 January 2016 and garnered similar reviews to the Kannada version with a critic from The New Indian Express noting, "Karaioram has a great look. If only the screenplay had been more exciting and the performances convincing".
