= Manasina Maathu =

- Directed by: R. Anantha Raju
- Based on: Roja Kootam (Tamil)(2002)
- Produced by: D K Ramakrishna (Praveen Kumar)
- Starring: Ajay Rao; Aindrita Ray; Tara
- Cinematography: M. R. Seenu
- Edited by: Sree
- Music by: A. M. Neel
- Production company: Manasa Chithra
- Release date: 28 January 2011
- Running time: 149 minutes
- Country: India
- Language: Kannada

Manasina Maathu is a 2011 Indian Kannada film directed by R. Anantha Raju and produced by Praveen Kumar. The film stars Ajay Rao and Aindrita Ray, paired together for the first time. The film is a remake of the Tamil film Roja Kootam (2002). A. M. Neel has composed the music and M. R. Seenu is the cinematographer for the film.The film was released on 28 January 2011 to negative reviews from the critics.

== Plot ==
The film is about the family entertaining romantic story.

== Cast ==
- Ajay Rao as Ajay
- Aindrita Ray as Sahana
- Lohith as Krishna
- Tara
- Avinash
- Sharan
- Sharath Lohitashwa
- Sadhu Kokila
- Umashri
- Padma Vasanthi
- Sathyajith

== Soundtrack ==
No.	Title	Performer(s)	Length
1.	"Agodella Olledakke"	Ajay Warrior
2.	"Bande Yaake"	Ajay Warrior, Nagachandrika
3.	"Helalu Bande"	Rajesh Krishnan
4.	"Khalbali"	A. M. Neel, Shantala Vattam
5.	"Naaniralu"	Kunal Ganjawala, Anuradha Bhat

== Reception ==
=== Critical response ===
A critic from The Times of India scored the film at 3 out of 5 stars and says "Aindrita Rai steals the show with her brilliant performance, especially in the emotional sequences. Ajay Rao has done justice to his role. Tara impresses. Sharan keeps up his good humour. M R Seenu's cinematography is good". A critic from The New Indian Express wrote "Neel's music has some good tunes, including ‘Hege helali nanna manasina maathu’ and ‘Naanirali nannavalu’. ‘Manasina Maathu’ is a feel-good film with neat performances. But its dragging moments take the film several notches down. But you can watch it once". A critic from Deccan Herald wrote "The movie benefits from the steady direction of Anantharaju, though the storyline gets tad predictable. However, it is redeemed by fresh performances by Ajay and Aindrita Ray and debutante Lohith. Neeladri’s music is catchy. A remake of Srikanth-Bhoomika starrer Roja Koottam, it turns out to be sporadically entertaining". Sunayana Suresh from DNA wrote "Ajay and Aindrita have really well-etched characters, which they bring alive magically. The first half has three forced songs, which could’ve have been done away with easily. But for that, this is the kind of film that makes for family viewing. Watch it this weekend, it can be worth your whil... ".
