= Reeshma Nanaiah =

Indian actress (born 2002)

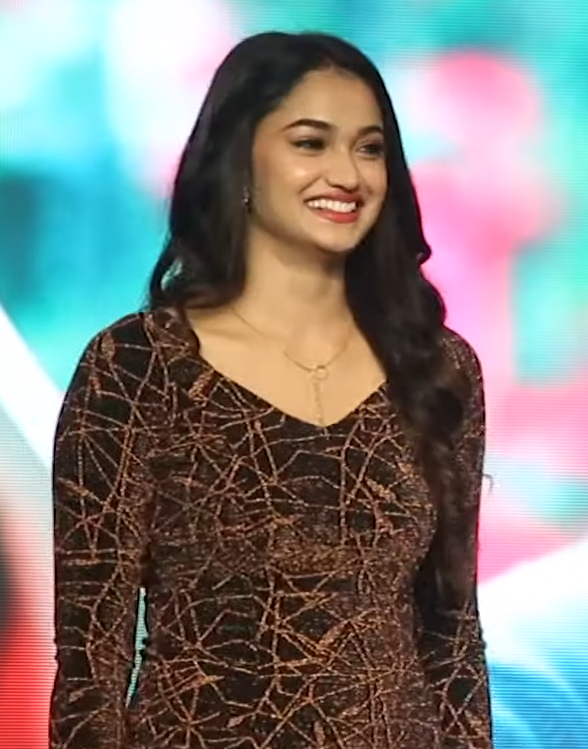
- Reeshma at audio event of Ek Love Ya
- Born: 28 April 2002 (age 24); Bangalore, Karnataka, India
- Education: Jyoti Nivas College, Bangalore
- Occupations: Actress; Model

Reeshma Nanaiah is an Indian model and film actress, who has worked predominantly in the Kannada films. She made her Kannada cinema debut through Prem's Ek Love Ya.

== Life and career ==
Reeshma Nanaiah was born to a Kodava-speaking family in Bangalore, Karnataka. She completed her degree in mass communication at Jyothi Nivas and is currently pursuing her masters. She did her schooling in Bangalore. She started her career as a model. She participated in The Livon Bangalore Times Fresh Face' and emerged as the runner up in that event.

She made her lead debut with Prem's Ek Love Ya (2022). Regarding her performance in the film, critics wrote that she "looks ravishing and justifies her role" and that she "shows promise of being a good commercial heroine". She subsequently starred in Nanda Kishore's Raana (2022). The film was released to mixed-to-negative reviews with a critic terming that her role was simply "the hero’s love interest" whilst one critic wrote that "Reeshma Nanaiah too has justified a poignant role".

In 2023, she made a special appearance in the horror film Spooky College in the recreation of the yesteryear song "Mellusire Savigana" and starred in Preetham Gubbi's Baanadariyalli. Regarding her performance in the latter film, critics wrote that her "presence adds a charm, and she gives a lighter touch in the second half of the emotionally charged story" and that she "does well in her playful charming role".

Her upcoming films include Prems's KD and Anna from Mexico co-starring Dhananjaya.

== Filmography ==
Key
†	Denotes films that have not yet been released

Filmography
Year	Title	Role	Note	Ref
2022	Ek Love Ya	Anitha		
2022	Raana	Priya		
2023	Spooky College	Herself	Special appearance in the song "Mellusire Savigana"	
2023	Baanadariyalli	Kadambari		
2024	UI	Nandini		
2025	Vaamana	Nandini		
2026	KD: The Devil	Machhlakshmi		
2026	Anna From Mexico †	TBA	Filming	
TBA	Worker †	TBA	Tamil film; announced	
