= Sharp Shooter (film) =

Sharpshooter
- Theatrical release poster
- Directed by: Ghouse Peer
- Written by: Ghouse Peer
- Screenplay by: Ghouse Peer
- Produced by: Balasubramanyam T. C. Srinivas B. V.
- Starring: Diganth; Sangeeta Chauhan
- Cinematography: Karunakar
- Edited by: Deepu S. Kumar
- Music by: M. S. Shiva Santosh
- Production company: S. B. Entertainment
- Distributed by: Thoogudeepa Distributors
- Release date: 11 December 2015
- Running time: 135 minutes
- Country: India
- Language: Kannada

Sharp Shooter is a 2015 Indian Kannada-language action comedy film written and directed by Ghouse Peer in his directorial debut. It stars Diganth and Sangeeta Chauhan in the lead roles. The supporting cast features Chikkanna, Lakshmi, Sudharani, Bhajarangi Lokesh, Achyuth Kumar and Rangayana Raghu.

== Plot ==
Sharp Shooter is a cocktail story with mixture of various elements such as love, drama, action and romance. The story revolves around a boy named JK and a girl named Nandhini. They end up falling in love with each other. However, they end up having a hard time trying to accept each other.

== Cast ==
- Diganth as Jedara Kannappa alias J K
- Sangeita Chauhan as Nandini
- Chikkanna
- Lakshmi
- Achyuth Kumar
- Daniel Kuttappa
- Saurav Lokesh
- Sudharani
- Sathyajith
- Rangayana Raghu
- Mithra
- Tumkur Mohan
- Sardar Satya
- Aindrita Ray in a special appearance in song "Kuntebille"

== Production ==
The film was a debut for Ghouse Peer as a director who had earlier worked in Kannada cinema as a lyricist. He wrote the story and screenplay for Sharpshooter. Following speculations about the female lead after having signed Diganth to play the male lead, Sangeetha Chauhan, a Mumbai-based model was signed. Reports in September 2014 said Aindrita Ray would be making a cameo appearance in a song in the film.

=== Filming ===
The film was launched with a muhuratam shot on 25 June 2014 in Bangalore. At the film launch, the makers stated the filming would begin on 2 July 2014 in Mysore, with a few action sequences. The makers also revealed the filming would then take place in Bangalore, Dubai, followed by song sequences in Europe. Filming completed in late-November 2014.

== Soundtrack ==
Sharp Shooter

Soundtrack album by M.S.Shiva Santosh
- Released: 2015
- Genre: Feature film soundtrack
- Length: 24:54
- Language: Kannada
- Label: Jhankar Music

M. S. Shiva Santhosh composed the film score and its soundtrack, lyrics for which was penned by Ghouse Peer, Chikkanna and Sridhar. The soundtrack album consists of six tracks.

=== Track listing ===
No.	Title	Lyrics	Singer(s)	Length
1.	"Yelle Hodaru"	Ghouse Peer	Sonu Nigam, Palak Muchhal	4:34
2.	"Kunte Bille"	Chikkanna	Bukkesh, Priya Himesh	4:19
3.	"Kannalle"	Sridhar	Karthik, Shreya Ghoshal	4:22
4.	"Devaranegunu"	Sridhar	Vijay Prakash	3:41
5.	"Kannalle (Mash-up)"	Sridhar	Diganth, Chikkanna, Chethan Naik	3:34
6.	"Yelle Hodaru (solo)"	Ghouse Peer	Sonu Nigam	4:34
Total length:				25:04
