= Dhool (2011 film) =

- Directed by: M R Dharani
- Screenplay by: M R Dharani
- Story by: Boopathy Pandian
- Based on: Thiruvilaiyaadal Aarambam (Tamil)
- Produced by: M H Sunil
- Starring: Yogesh; Aindrita Ray; Prakash Raj
- Cinematography: K. Datthu
- Edited by: Deepu S. Kumar
- Music by: V. Harikrishna
- Production company: Sri Sevalal Productions
- Release date: 30 April 2011
- Running time: 141 minutes
- Country: India
- Language: Kannada
- Box office: ₹1 crore

Dhool is a 2011 Indian Kannada-language romantic action film written and directed by Dharani, son of director M. S. Rajashekar in his second directorial venture after Baalashiva. The film was produced by M. H. Sunil. The film stars Yogesh, Aindrita Ray and Prakash Raj. It was a remake of Tamil hit film, Thiruvilaiyaadal Aarambam (2006), directed by Boopathy Pandian. Prakash Raj reprised his own role from the original version. The film stars the soundtrack and original scores composed by V. Harikrishna.

== Plot ==
Guru (Yogesh), an unemployed youth is a carefree guy. He meets Priya (Aindrita) in a temple and instantly falls for her. Priya is the sister of rich industrialist Nanda (Prakash) who is extremely possessive about her. Knowing his adamant attitude, Guru approaches Nanda and asks for his sister's hand. Enraged upon his daring, Nanda kicks him out of the house. But Guru silently woos Priya and both fall in love. Nanda uses his money power to break this alliance in several attempts but fails. Later Guru takes up a challenge to win over Priya using his money power and succeeds.

== Cast ==
- Yogesh as Guru
- Aindrita Ray as Priya
- Prakash Raj as Nanda
- Om Prakash Rao as Nanda's PA
- Achyuth Kumar as Guru's Father
- Sudha Belawadi as Guru's Mother
- Richard Louis
- Mandeep Roy
- Sudheendra

== Production ==
The film began its principal photography in 2009 and the first schedule was completed by 11 September 2009. It was reported that the actor Prakash Rai, who reprised his role from the original Tamil film, was paid ₹40 Lakhs for his role.

== Soundtrack ==
Dhool

Soundtrack album by V. Harikrishna
- Released: 2010
- Genre: Film soundtrack
- Label: Akshaya Audio

The audio was launched on Akshaya Audio label. The audio launch event was held at Bangalore with actor Yogesh presence. Actress Aindrita Ray was absent at the event as she was away on a trip. There was a row between actress and director over her absence which was amicably solved later. The song "Amma Loosa" was hugely popular among the masses and was on top of the dance charts for many weeks. The song "Nanna Neenu Gellalare" was recreated from the track of 1981 movie Nee Nanna Gellalare.

All music is composed by V. Harikrishna.

Track listing
No.	Title	Lyrics	Singer(s)	Length
1.	"Eduru Mane Meenakshi"	V. Nagendra Prasad	Rajesh Krishnan
2.	"Hindilla Mundilla"	Yogaraj Bhat	Karthik
3.	"Nanageke Heege"	V. Nagendra Prasad	Haricharan, Nanditha
4.	"Vasantha Banthu"	Kaviraj	Suvi Suresh
5.	"Nanna Neenu Gellalare"	V. Nagendra Prasad	S. P. Balasubrahmanyam, Tippu
6.	"Amma Loosa"	V. Nagendra Prasad	V. Harikrishna, Megha

== Reception ==
=== Critical response ===
Shruti Indira Lakshminarayana from Rediff.com scored the film at 3 out of 5 stars and says "Dhool has nothing new to offer in terms of story. In fact it is inspired by Tamil super hit film Thiruvilleyadal Aarambam. The film makes an enjoyable one time watch because of its comedy and its punches. Yogi won't disappoint his fans". A critic from The New Indian Express wrote "The movie Dhool is an action oriented flick". Sunayana Suresh from DNA wrote "V Harikrishna has scored some good numbers, especially 'Amma Loosa'. The Dr Rajkumar hit Nanna Neenu Gellalaare, which is recreated featuring Yogesh and Prakash Raj, is quite good too. This makes for a perfect weekend watch". B S Srivani from Deccan Herald wrote "Aindrita is pleasing on the eye. Achyuth, Sudha Belawadi and others add their mite to make the film relatable. Dharani’s screenplay scores that way. Harikrishna’s music has some unusual ‘sounds’ but except for the “Loosa” song the rest don’t make the cut".
