= Meravanige =

- Directed by: Mahesh Babu
- Screenplay by: Mahesh Babu
- Story by: Janardhana Maharshi
- Produced by: Sri Muneshwara Films
- Starring: Prajwal Devaraj; Aindrita Ray
- Cinematography: Mahesh Talakad
- Edited by: M. Muniraj
- Music by: V. Manohar
- Production company: Sri Muneshwara Films
- Release date: 27 June 2008
- Running time: 137 minutes
- Language: Kannada

Meravanige (Kannada: ಮೆರವಣಿಗೆ) is a 2008 Indian Kannada romantic thriller film directed by Mahesh Babu from a story written by Janardhana Maharshi and stars Prajwal Devaraj and Aindrita Ray in the lead roles.

== Plot ==
Vijay Kumar and Nandini are classmates and rivals who are kidnapped by a terrorist named Basheer as their fathers ACP Prakash and DCP Suresh had arrested Basheer's brother Iqbal. Basheer demands the release of Iqbal, but Vijay and Nandini escapes and roams around the forest where they encounter many situations and develops feelings for each other. Basheer sends his henchmen to hunt Vijay and Nandini, where Nandini gets kidnapped again. Prakash and Suresh arrive at the place to hand over Iqbal in exchange for Nandini, but Vijay soon arrives and gets Basheer arrested. Vijay and Nandini get married with the approval of their parents.

== Cast ==
- Prajwal Devaraj as Vijay Kumar
- Aindrita Ray as Nandini
- Sadhu Kokila
- Komal
- Harish
- Vinayak Joshi
- Bhanu Chander
- Avinash as DCP Suresh
- Sudha
- Vidya Murthy
- Rajaram. H. S.
- Jaidev
- Roopesh Gowda
- Ravi Kale as Basheer
- Ramya in a cameo appearance

== Soundtrack ==
The soundtrack was composed by V. Manohar.

No.	Title	Lyrics	Singer(s)	Length
1.	"Endendu Active Aagi"	Kaviraj	Shankar Mahadevan	5:03
2.	"Elliruve Yaare Neenu"	Kaviraj	Udit Narayan, Shamitha Malnad	4:37
3.	"Patangavagi Naa"	Jayanth Kaikini	Supriya Acharya	4:29
4.	"Nannolave"	Jayanth Kaikini	Kunal Ganjawala	4:22
5.	"Mana Mugila Mele (bit)"	V. Manohar	Shruthi	3:01
6.	"Student Life (bit)"	V. Manohar	Vijay Aras	1:04
7.	"Kaanana Kaanana"	V. Manohar	Vijay Aras	1:32

== Reception ==
A critic from Rediff.com wrote that "Watch Meravanige for its freshness and visuals".
