= Chikkanna =

Indian actor (born 1984)

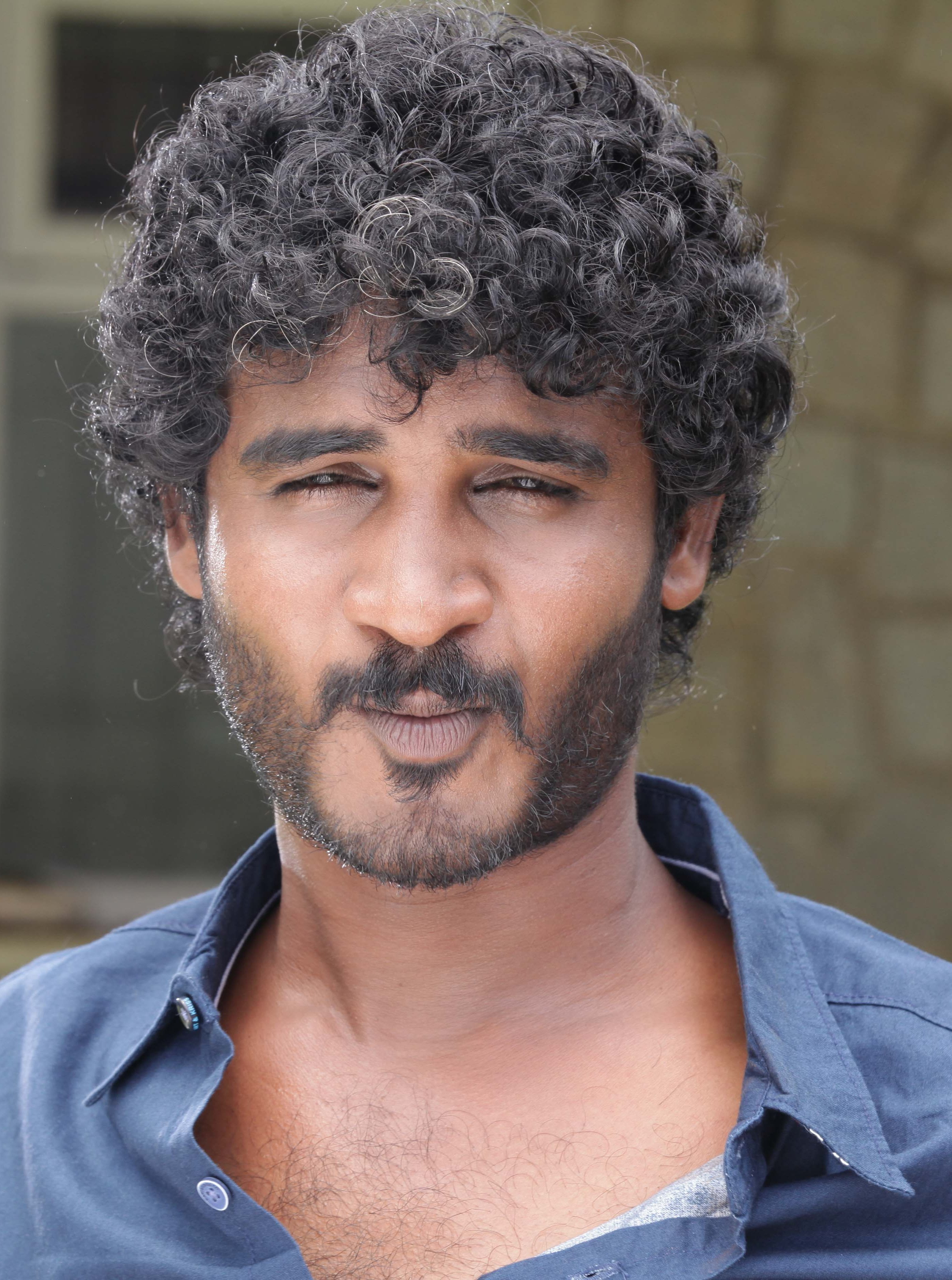
- Chikkanna in 2015 during the filming of Ishtakamya
- Born: 22 June 1984 (age 41); Ballahalli, Mysore, Karnataka, India
- Occupation: Actor
- Years active: 2011–present
- Known for: Comedy

Chikkanna (born 22 June 1984), is an Indian actor who works in Kannada cinema and appears primarily in comic roles. He made his debut in films with Kirataka (2011), following which he was recognized for his performances in Raja Huli (2013) and Adyaksha (2014). Chikkanna played the lead role for the first time in the film Upadhyaksha (2024).

== Career ==
Chikkanna began his acting career in comedy shows in Mysore with Drishya Kalavide. He then appeared in Comedy Kiladigalu in Zee Kannada, and a Prank Show which aired on Udaya TV. Actor Yash noticed his performance at the diamond jubilee celebrations of Kannada cinema and cast him in the 2011 film, Kirataka. In Raja Huli (2013) and Adyaksha (2014), he played roles alongside Yash and Sharan. In the 2015 film Sharp Shooter, he played alongside Diganth and wrote the lyrics for the track "Kuntebille".

== Filmography ==
Key
†	Denotes films that have not yet been released

Year	Film	Role	Notes	Ref.
2011	Kirataka			
2012	Lucky			
2012	Mr. 420	Madesha		
2012	Villain			
2012	Snehitaru	Harish		
2013	Raja Huli	Chikka	Won—SIIMA Award for Best Comedian	
2013	Bulbul			
2013	Rajani Kantha			
2013	Victory			
2013	Jinkemari	Muddukrishna		
2014	Navarangi			
2014	Anjada Gandu	Ramesha		
2014	Kwatle Satisha	Chikkanna		
2014	Savaari 2			
2014	Baasu Ade Hale Kathe			
2014	Darling			
2014	Adyaksha	Narayana	Won—SIIMA Award for Best Comedian	
2014	Tirupathi Express	Malya		
2014	Just Love			
2015	Rudra Tandava			
2015	Bombay Mittai	Sundra		
2015	Patharagitthi			
2015	Ranna	Lakshmi Narayana		
2015	Vajrakaya			
2015	Sapnon Ki Rani			
2015	Chandrika		Bilingual (Kannada, Telugu)	
2015	Mr. Airavata			
2015	Ram-Leela			
2015	Rathavara			
2015	Mumtaz			
2015	Bangalore 560023	Mahalinga		
2015	Sharpshooter		Also lyricist for song "Kuntebille" and Singer for "Kannale Mashup"	
2015	Masterpiece	Bruce Lee	Won—SIIMA Award for Best Comedian; Nominated, IIFA Utsavam Award for Best Performance in a Comic Role	
2016	Maduveya Mamatheya Kareyole			
2016	Mast Mohabbat			
2016	Whatsapp Love			
2016	Tyson			
2016	Thale Bachkolli Powder Hakkolli	Indra		
2016	Lakshmana			
2016	Jigarthanda			
2016	Ishtakamya			
2016	Doddmane Hudga	Lavanga		
2016	Nanna Ninna Prema Kathe		Also playback singer	
2016	Kotigobba 2	Chikkanna	Nominated -SIIMA Award for Best Comedian	
2016	Mudinja Ivana Pudi	Saravana	Tamil film	
2016	Happy Birthday			
2017	Chowka	Manju		
2017	Style Raja			
2017	Hebbuli	Sundara		
2017	Raajakumara	Chikka		
2017	Bangara s/o Bangarada Manushya			
2017	Tiger	Bahubali		
2017	Siliconn City			
2017	Raj Vishnu	Shankar Nag		
2017	Satya Harishchandra	Dodda		
2017	Jaali Baaru Mattu Poli Hudugaru			
2017	Mufti			
2017	Anjani Putra	Chikka		
2018	Samhaara	Raja Huli	Nominated - Filmibeat Award for Best Comedian - Kannada	
2018	Dalapathi			
2018	Bhootayyana Mommaga Ayyu	Ayyu		
2018	Amma I Love You			
2018	Double Engine	Krishna		
2018	Kannadakkaagi Ondannu Otti			
2018	Kismath			
2018	Raambo 2	Jagga	Nominated - 8th South Indian International Movie Awards best comedian	
2019	Natasaarvabhowma	Keshav	Nominated - 9th South Indian International Movie Awards best comedian	
2019	Kaddu Mucchi			
2019	Seetharama Kalyana	Arya's friend		
2019	Amar	Chikka		
2019	Padde Huli			
2019	Kiss	Jaggi		
2019	Mane Maratakkide	Raghupathi		
2019	Odeya	Lawyer Chari		
2020	Shri Bharatha Baahubali			
2020	French Biriyani	Gabru		
2020	Billgates			
2020	Pogaru	Shiva's friend		
2021	Roberrt	Agni		
2021	Krishna Talkies	Suri		
2021	Rider	Chikku		
2022	James	Madan		
2022	Kaaneyaadavara Bagge Prakatane			
2022	Bairagee	Dancer	Cameo appearance	
2023	Mr. Bachelor	Chikku		
2023	Raja Marthanda			
2024	Upadhyaksha	Narayana	Debut as lead	
2025	Choo Mantar	RJ		
2025	Forest	Buddy Kumara		
2025	Raju James Bond	TRP		
2026	Lakshmiputra		Filming	
2026	Jodettu		Announced	
