= Abhaya Simha =

Indian film director

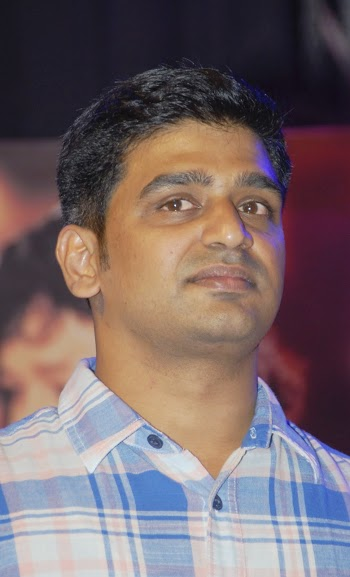
- Abhaya Simha
- Born: 12 June 1981 (age 45); Mangalore
- Occupation: Film director
- Years active: 2007 - Present
- Spouse: Rashmi Abhaya Simha

Abhaya Simha is a Kannada film director and screenwriter.

== Early life and career ==
He was born and brought up in Mangalore, Karnataka. He did his graduation from St. Aloysius College, Mangalore. He studied Kannada, English Literature and Journalism. After that he specialized in Film Direction from Film and Television Institute of India, Pune. He started his film career in Bangalore in 2007. His debut venture Gubbachchigalu won the National Award for the best children's film for the year 2008. His second venture was a bilingual movie named Shikari. Shikari was released in March 2012 across Karnataka and Kerala. His third film was Sakkare in Kannada starring Ganesh (actor). It was released across Karnataka in November 2013. In 2017 he made Paddayi in Tulu won 65th National award for Best Feature Film in Tulu.

== Early life ==
Abhaya Simha has completed his graduation from St Aloysius College, Mangalore. Later he did his film studies from Film and Television Institute of India (FTII) Pune. His grandfather was G.T. Narayana Rao, a well-known science writer in Kannada, music critic, cultural organiser, and a prominent citizen of the city of Mysore, India.

== Filmography ==
Year	Film	Language	Notes
2008	Gubbachigalu	Kannada	Winner National Film Award for Best Children's Film
2012	Shikari	Malayalam	Bilingual film
2012	Shikari	Kannada	Bilingual film
2013	Sakkare	Kannada	
2017	Paddayi	Tulu	Best Feature Film in Tulu -2017
