= Raana (2022 film) =

2022 Indian Kannada-language action thriller film

- Directed by: Nanda Kishore
- Written by: Magizh Thirumeni
- Based on: Thadaiyara Thaakka (2012)
- Produced by: Gujjal Purushotham
- Starring: Shreyas Manju; Reeshma Nanaiah
- Cinematography: Shekhar Chandra
- Edited by: K. M. Prakash
- Music by: Chandan Shetty
- Production company: Gujjal Talkies
- Release date: 11 November 2022
- Country: India
- Language: Kannada

Raana is a 2022 Indian Kannada-language action thriller film directed by Nanda Kishore and produced by Gujjal Purushotham under Gujjal Talkies banners. The film stars Shreyas Manju and Reeshma Nanaiah in the lead roles. It is the adaptation of the 2012 Tamil film Thadaiyara Thaakka. The soundtrack and background score were composed by Chandan Shetty.

Raana was released on 11 November 2022 and received mixed to negative reviews from critics, where it became an average grosser at the box office.

== Plot ==
Raana is a police trainee who works as a cab driver in Bangalore, who is all set to marry his girlfriend Priya. The city is under the grip of dreaded loan shark brothers Kapali and Soori who would go to any extent to wield their clout in the city. During a rainy night, Raana comes across a drunk Kapali. Within a few minutes, Kapali is killed in mysterious circumstances and the blame falls on Raana as the murder weapon was on his car. Soori and his men wants to bump off Raana. A perplexed Raana runs for cover and sets out to find the real killer.

Past: Kapali had abducted a girl named Rajani, who is the only daughter of a wealthy Mumbai-based businessman and has been using her solely as his personal slave for 9 months, revolting on the thought that even the richest and most powerful men in the country can't touch her. One rainy night, Rajani escapes captivity and comes across the intoxicated Kapali sitting on the road. She uses the chance to exact vengeance and kills him. Her helper at home discreetly (but unintentionally) places the murder weapon in Raana's car, which led to Raana getting framed for Kapali's death.

Present: Raana's two friends are taken captive and one of them is killed off brutally by Soori and the other is set to be killed if Raana doesn't surrender to Soori that night. Priya's family escapes the city to save themselves. With his entire life turned around by a crime he did not commit, Raana takes a new avatar as he decides to wage a bloody war with the gangsters where he kills Soori and the 8 members of his gang. To dispose of the bodies, Raana uses a meat grinder overnight and feeds the flesh to the pigs. Later, Rajani reunites with her parents.

== Cast ==
- Shreyas Manju as Raana
- Reeshma Nanaiah as Priya
- Mohan Dhanraj as Soori
- Mutant Raghu as Kapali
- Kote Prabhakar as Pachchi
- Samyuktha Hegde as a dancer (Special appearance in the song "Malli Malli")

== Soundtrack ==
The soundtrack and background score of the film were composed by Chandan Shetty.

Track listing
No.	Title	Lyrics	Singer(s)	Length
1.	"Gully Boy"	Chandan Shetty	Aniruddha Sastry; Aditi Sagar	4:17
2.	"Malli Malli"	Shivu Bergi	Chandan Shetty; Divya Ramachandra	4: 42
3.	"Udho Udho Huligemma"	V. Nagendra Prasad	Karibasava Tadakal	4: 31

== Release ==
The film was released on 11 November 2022 in theatres.

=== Home media ===
The satellite and digital rights were sold to Udaya TV and Sun NXT.

== Reception ==
Sridevi. S of The Times of India gave 2.5 out of 5 stars and wrote "The film, directed by Nanda Kishore, is, however, a typical run-of-the-mill story with cliched narrative, fights, stunts, and dialogue. The same old tale of friends coming to the rescue of the hero while he asks his lover to leave the city and other predictable twists at the end make the film flimsy. The cinematography, however, is a big blessing. So is the music by Chandan Shetty, which adds tempo to the screenplay". Jagadish Angadi of Deccan Herald gave 1.5 out of 5 stars and wrote "Lack of professionalism in every department of filmmaking — direction, screenplay, cinematography, music, lyrics and acting — is glaring. There is hardly anything to mention about the acting of Shreyas Manju and Reeshma Nanaiah but the hero is a treat to watch in action sequences".
