= Guru Deshpande =

Indian film director

- Occupations: Film director; screenwriter; producer
- Years active: 2008–present

Guru Deshpande is an Indian film director, producer and distributor, known for his work in Kannada film industry. He is well known for Raja Huli starring Yash and Meghana Raj. In 2019, Guru Deshpande turned produced launching his banner G Cinemas and started a Film Institute under the name G Academy in Bengaluru.

== Career ==
=== Direction ===
In 2012, Guru Deshpande moved back to direction with his sophomore directorial Yash, Meghana Raj starrer Raja Huli and was produced by K Manju. The movie released on Kannada Rajyotsava in 2013 and got a fantastic opening at the box-office.

Raja Huli went on to complete 119 days of successful run and was declared Blockbuster. Raja Huli completed Yash's hat-trick success after Drama and Googly.

In 2014, Guru Deshpande announced Rudratandava starring Chiranjeevi Sarja and Radhika Kumaraswamy, the action film released in February 2015 to mixed response. His next project was the 2016 comedy drama John Jani Janardhan with Ajay Rao, Yogesh and 'Madarangi' Krishna in lead roles.

In 2019 launched producer K. Manju son Shreyas Manju with Padde Huli, the action drama had Nishvika Naidu as female lead and host of Sandalwood Superstars playing key roles.

=== Production house and film school ===
After working for two decades in Kannada Film Industry, director Guru Deshpande turned producer launching G Cinemas in 2019 and announced Gentleman starring Prajwal Devaraj and Gandhinagar was excited with this amazing combination. Gentleman is a crime-action film written and directed by Jadesh Kumar Hampi, Action Prince Prajwal Devaraj and Nishvika Naidu essayed the lead roles, B. Ajaneesh Loknath handled background score. Puneeth Rajkumar and Dhruva Sarja released trailer on 6 January 2020 and it immediately caught audience attention.

The film's Wake Up Theme song sung by Anthony Dasan was released on 29 January 2020. Even before Gentleman movie released there was big demand in Tamil and Telugu for the remake rights.

In 2020, Guru Deshpande launched two more movies under G Cinemas banner 'Love You Racchu' starring Ajay Rao and Rachita Ram written by Shashank and directed by debutant Shankar Raj and 'Pentagon', an anthology film co-produced by Kaushik Izardar. 'Pentagon' has generated curiosity among Sandalwood fans especially for the combination of five directors Raghu Shivamoga, Chandra Mohan, Akash Srivatsa, Kiran Kumar and Guru Deshpande. Manikanth Kadri will be composing the music, cinematography is handled by Kiran Hampapur and Abhilash Kallathi, and edited by Venkatesh UDV. His next project will be the much awaited sports drama ‘Thackeray’ expected to go on floors soon.

After donning the hats of director and producer Guru Deshpande launched G Academy, Institute of Cinema and Entertainment in 2019. Well known Sandalwood directors Dayal Padmanabhan, 'Jatta' Giriraj, Satyaprakash, 'Bahaddur' Chethan Kumar are among faculty at the film school.

== Personal life ==
Guru Deshpande married Shilpa Deshpande in 2004 and they have a son. Shilpa debuted in films with Pentagon under the screen name Pritika Deshpande.

== Filmography ==
Key
†	Denotes as yet unreleased films

Year	Film	Direction	Producer	Writer	Actor	Notes
2008	Varasdhara	Yes	No	Screenplay	Yes	Notes
2013	Raja Huli	Yes	No	Screenplay	No	
2015	Rudra Tandava	Yes	No	Screenplay	No	
2016	John Jani Janardhan	Yes	No	Screenplay	Yes	
2018	Samhaara	Yes	No	Screenplay	No	
2019	Padde Huli	Yes	No	Screenplay	Yes	
2020	Gentleman	No	Yes	No	No	
2021	Love You Rachchu	No	Yes	No	No	
2022	Ombattane Dikku	No	Yes	No	No	
2023	Pentagon	Yes	Yes	Creative Head	No	Anthology film; segment Karma
2025	Thackeray †	Yes	No	Screenplay	No	
