= Seizer =

2018 Indian Kannada crime-action film

- Release poster
- Directed by: Vinay Krishna
- Written by: Vinay Krishna
- Produced by: Trivikram Sapalya; Vinay Krishna
- Starring: Chiranjeevi Sarja; V. Ravichandran; Parul Yadav
- Cinematography: Anji; Rajesh Kata
- Edited by: Srikanth
- Music by: Chandan Shetty
- Production companies: Druthi Creations; SKLNS Productions
- Release date: April 13, 2018
- Running time: 140 minutes
- Country: India
- Language: Kannada

Seizer is a 2018 Indian Kannada-language action crime film directed and co-produced by Vinay Krishna in his directorial debut. The film stars Chiranjeevi Sarja, Parul Yadav, V. Ravichandran, Prakash Raj and Nagineedu. The soundtrack and background score were composed by Chandan Shetty, while the cinematography and editing were handled by Anji-Rajesh Kata and Srikanth.

The film was announced on 9 November 2015 and went through a development hell, but was revived in November 2016. Besides Bangalore, the filming took place in Mysore and the climax scene was shot at Sabarimala.

Seizer was released on 13 April 2018 and received mixed reviews from critics.

== Premise ==
Seizer is a vehicle seizer for a private finance company who seizes the car of a gangster named Bhupathi and a bitter battle erupts between them, leading to violent encounters.

== Cast ==
- Chiranjeevi Sarja as Seizer
- Prakash Raj as Bhupathi
- V. Ravichandran as Seizer's Boss
- Ravi Prakash as Ravi, Police Officer
- Parul Yadav
- Nagineedu
- Sadhu Kokila
- Avinash
- Ramesh Bhat

== Soundtrack ==
Seizer

Soundtrack album by Chandan Shetty
- Genre: Feature film soundtrack
- Language: Kannada
- Label: Anand Audio
- Producer: Chandan Shetty

The film's background score and the soundtracks are composed, written and sung by Chandan Shetty. The music rights were acquired by Ananda Audio.

All lyrics are written by Chandan Shetty.

Tracklist
No.	Title	Singer(s)	Length
1.	"Hodallella"	Chandan Shetty
2.	"Modala Baari"	Chandan Shetty
3.	"Pucca Local Seizer"	Chandan Shetty
4.	"Unlimited"	Chandan Shetty
5.	"One & Only Iva Ekangi"	Chandan Shetty

== Reception ==
=== Critical response ===
Sunayana Suresh of The Times of India gave the film a rating of 2.5/5 and wrote "All said, Seizer isn't a bad option for people who are looking for a dose of routine commercial drama. If you're a fan of Chiranjeevi Sarja, Ravichandran or Prakash Raj, this might be of interest to you. Go ahead and give it a try". Vijaya Karnataka wrote "Though director Vinay Krishna has promised to make his debut, there is a need to focus more on story and screenplay. Those who like buildup films can watch cinema".
