= Vinayak Joshi =

Indian Kannada actor, radio jockey

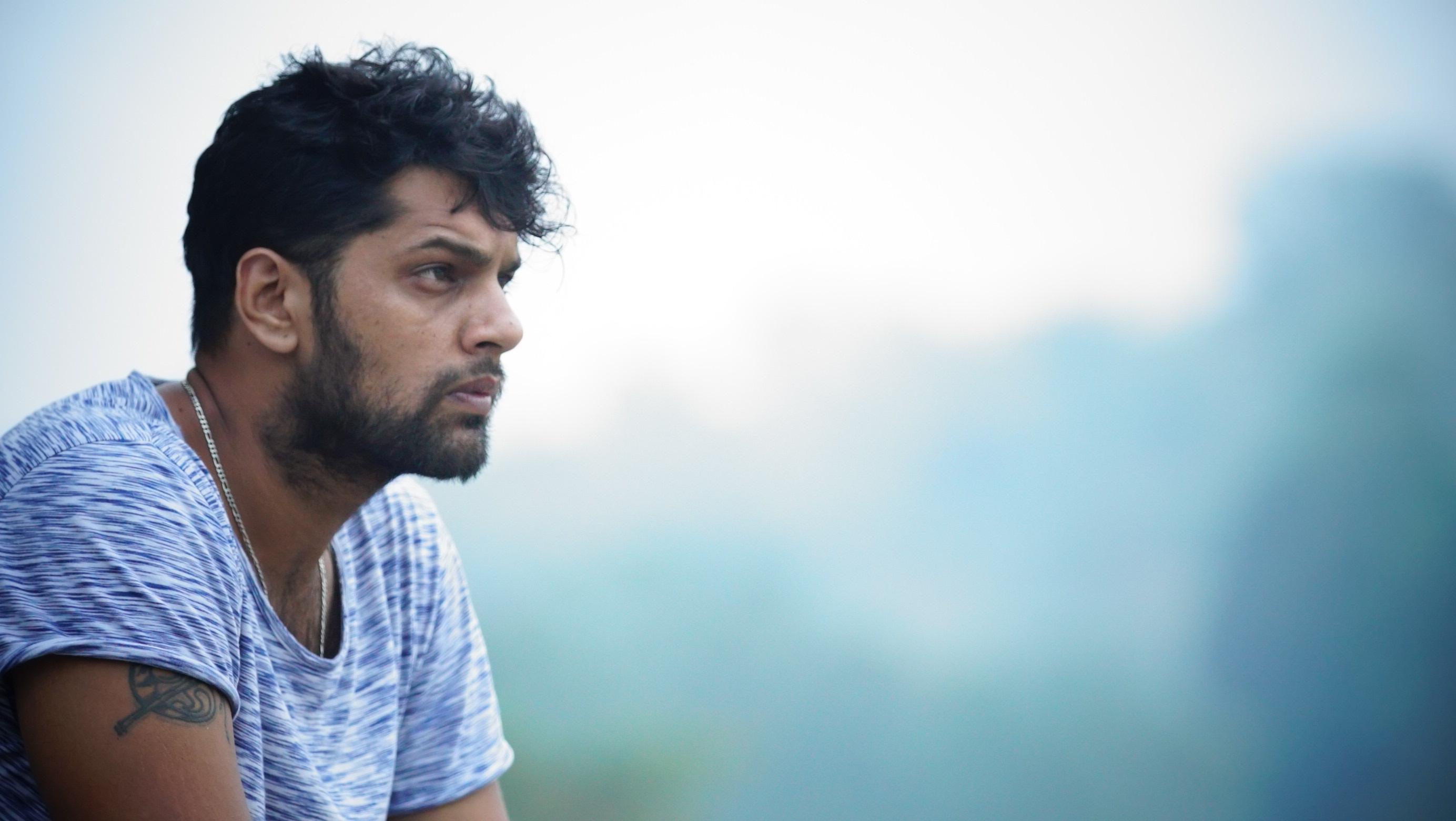
- Joshi during filming of Joshelay web series
- Born: 25 August 1987 (age 38); Bangalore, Karnataka, India
- Occupations: Actor, Director
- Spouse: Varsha Belawadi

Vinayak Joshi is an Indian film, television, web-series and theatre actor. He has been a host in more than 1000 live events across 20 countries. Currently he is the Head of production at Cult.fit and an independent film maker. He recently acted, directed, produced and wrote a web-series called Joshelay. It has collectively made a million views on YouTube.

== Career ==
He was a child actor in the 1996 movie Nammoora Mandara Hoove, by Sunil Kumar Desai, starring Shivrajkumar, Ramesh and Prema.

His other movies include Amrutha Varshini, Laali, Simhada Mari, Kurigalu Saar Kurigalu, Appu, Kanti, Nanna Kanasina Hoove, Minchina Ota, Chitra, Govindaya Namaha, and Jaguar.

== Filmography ==
Actor

- Nammoora Mandara Hoove (1997)
- Amrutha Varshini (1997)
- Simhada Mari (1997)
- Laali (1998)
- Aryabhata (1999)
- Kurigalu Saar Kurigalu (2001)
- Chitra (2001)
- Chitte (2001)
- Appu (2002)
- Kanti (2003)
- Panchali (2003)
- Kiccha (2003)
- Baa Baaro Rasika (2004)
- Sakha Sakhi (2005)
- Nanna Kanasina Hoove (2006)
- Minchina Ota (2008)
- Meravanige (2008)
- Govindaya Namaha (2012)
- Nam Duniya Nam Style (2013)
- Ambara (2013)
- Namo Bhoothathma (2014)
- Ninnindale (2014)
- Jaguar (2016)
- Raju Kannada Medium (2018)
- Fortuner(2018)
- Loose Connection (2018)
- Padde Huli (2019)
- Adyaksha in America (2019)
- 9 Sullu (2021)
- Viraataparva (2019)

Director

- Joshelay (2018) – Web Series

Dubbing artist

- Tejas (Priyanka)
- Thakur Anoop Singh (Rogue)
- Vishwa Karna (100)
