= Chandan Shetty =

Indian composer, lyricist, and singer

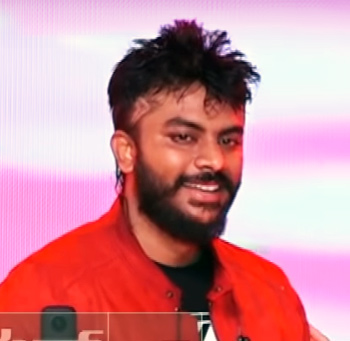
- Chandan Shetty in 2019

Background information
- Born: Chandan shetty 17 September 1989 (age 37); Shantigrama, Hassan, Karnataka, India
- Genres: Pop and Disco
- Occupations: Singer-Music Composer - lyricist
- Instruments: Guitarist, drummer
- Years active: 2012–present
- Label: Chandan Shetty
- Spouse: Niveditha Gowda (m. 2020; div. 2024)

Chandan Shetty (born 17 September 1989) is an Indian composer, lyricist, and pop singer who works in Kannada films. Shetty gained fame as a solo artist with Kannada singles such as "Halagode", "3 Peg", "Chocolate Girl", "Tequila" "Fire" and "Party Freak.

== Career ==
Shetty entered the music industry in 2012, as a lyricist and assistant music director for the movie Alemaari, under the music director, Arjun Janya. He went on to work on the music of films such as Varadanayaka, Power, Chakravyuha, and Bhajarangi. He was engaged to his co-contestant of Bigg Boss Kannada Season 5, Niveditha Gowda on 21 October. He won in the reality show Bigg Boss Kannada Season 5. He married her on 25 February 2020.

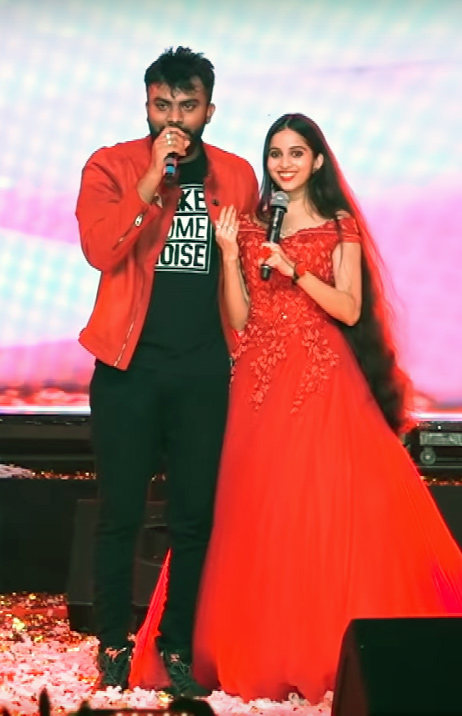
Chandan Shetty with his then wife Niveditha Gowda in October 2019

== Controversies ==
January 2025

Kannada rapper-composer Chandan Shetty's latest song is caught in a plagiarism row. Yuvraj YBull has alleged that Chandan has copied portions of his 2018 party song Y Bull and is looking at filing a copyright case

=== August 2020 ===
Chandan Shetty stoked a controversy by presenting his version of the folk song 'Kolumande Jangamadeva'. A section from the Old Mysuru region has objected to this song claiming that Shetty distorted the very history of Malemadeshwara Swamy, to whom the song is dedicated, thus hurting their religious sentiments. Several people have also objected to the way the song has been depicted. They said that Sharane Sankamma has been insulted in this song and, thus, the entire Sharana tradition has also been insulted by the rap singer. Following the outrage, Anand Audio Company had deleted the song from YouTube.

=== October 2019 ===
During Dasara celebrations of 2019, he proposed to reality TV star Niveditha Gowda on the Yuva Dasara stage, which is meant for cultural events. Chandan was performing at the government-sponsored Dasara programme at the Maharaja's College grounds. District in-charge minister V Somanna said, "I have told the police to issue a show-cause notice. We will consider action as per the law. It is wrong to misuse the platform."

May 2022

He Promoted MPL, Junglee Rummy and other gambling apps.

== Filmography ==
| Year | Film | Role | Note |
|---|---|---|---|
| 2026 | Elra Kaaleliyatte Kaala | Vijay | Acting Debut |

== Discography ==
Key
| † | Denotes films that have not yet been released |

All music composed is for Kannada films, unless mentioned.

=== As music composer ===
| Year | Film | Director |
|---|---|---|
| 2016 | Railway Children | Prithvi Konanur |
| 2017 | Sanjeeva | Shree Panchami Cini |
| 2017 | Ganchali | Ashok |
| 2017 | Appuge | Vikram Shetty |
| 2018 | Joshelay | Vinayak Joshi |
| 2018 | Seizer | Vinay Krishna |
| 2019 | Digbayam | Amith |
| 2021 | Pogaru | Nanda Kishore |
| 2022 | Raana | Nanda Kishore |
| 2024 | Choo Mantar | Navaneeth |
| 2025 | Suthradaari | Kiran Kumar |
| 2025 | GST | Srujan Lokesh |

=== Singles - YouTube Channels ===
| Year | Song | Artist | Label | Notes |
|---|---|---|---|---|
| 2011 | Nanna Preethi Sullalla | - | Chandan Shetty | |
| 2015 | Halagode | Himself | Chandan Shetty | |
| 2016 | 3 PEG | Aindrita Ray | Chandan Shetty | |
| 2016 | Kirik Keerthi Namma Bengaluru | Himself | Kirik Keerthi | |
| 2017 | Chocolate Girl | Neha Shetty | Chandan Shetty | |
| 2017 | Tequila | Shalni Gowda | Chandan Shetty | |
| 2019 | Fire | Himself | Chandan Shetty | |
| 2019 | Shokilala | Ashvithi Shetty, Raashi | T-Series | |
| 2019 | Bad Boy | Mateen Hussain | T-Series | |
| 2020 | Get High | Niveditha Gowda | Chandan Shetty | |
| 2020 | Kolumunde | Himself | Anand Audio | |
| 2020 | Party Freak (Kannada) | Nishvika Naidu | United Audios | |
| 2020 | Party Freak (Telugu) | Nishvika Naidu | United Audios | |
| 2021 | Salige | Himself | Chandan Shetty | |
| 2021 | Nodu Shiva | Megha Shetty | Anand Audio | |
| 2021 | Laka Laka Lambargini | Rachita Ram, Baby Bindya K | Chandan Shetty | |
| 2024 | Cotton Candy | Chandan Shetty Ft. Sushmitha Gopinath | Chandan Shetty | |
| 2026 | Maimata | Agastya Raag | Chandan Shetty | |

=== Television ===
| Show | Channel | As a |
|---|---|---|
| Bigg Boss Kannada 5 | Colors Super | Winner |
| Master Dancer | Colors Super | Judge |
| Kannada Kogile | Colors Super | Judge |
| Kannada Kogile 2 | Colors Super | Judge |
| Kannada Kogile Super Season 3 | Colors Super | Judge |
| Raja Rani | Colors Kannada | 2nd Runner Up |

| Preceded by Pratham (2016) | Bigg Boss Kannada Winner (Series 5) 2017 | Succeeded by Shashi Kumar (2018) |

== See also ==
- Alok R. Babu
