= Vicky Varun =

Indian actor

Vikky Varun
- Born: Santhosh Reva; June 2, 1990 (age 36); Chamarajanagara, Karnataka, India
- Occupation: Actor
- Years active: 2009–present

Vikky Varun (born Santhosh Reva; also credited as Vikky Varun) is an Indian actor and director who works in Kannada cinema.

He worked as an assistant director for Duniya Soori and Yogaraj Bhat before making his lead debut in films with Kendasampige (2015) which earned him wide appreciations and nominations under the best debut actor category at the Filmfare Awards South and SIIMA Awards. He has since worked in College Kumar (2017) He has won the “Best Entertainer” award at the Bengaluru Film Festival. His deubt directorial Kaalapatthar (2024). He has won best debut Direction Award and, the Best Promising Movie at the Chittara Star Awards 2025!

== Early life ==
He completed his B.Com. degree at the Mysore University. His strong interest towards film making made him to approach leading film directors Yogaraj Bhat and Duniya Soori and bagged the opportunity to work as an associate and later assistant director for both of them.

== Career ==
Soon after being employed as an associate director, Vikky assisted director Duniya Soori in films such as Jackie, Anna Bond and Kaddipudi, where he also played a brief role. He assisted Yogaraj Bhat in the film Paramathma. He considered Soori as his protege and upon his insistence, he agreed to star as a lead role in the director's offbeat film Kendasampige opposite another debutant Manvitha Harish in 2015. The film went on to one among the top grossers of the year and also screened for hundred days across cinema halls. Subsequently, he was nominated for the best debut actor in both SIIMA and Filmfare Awards South.

Following the success of his debut film, Vikky took a year break and chose Alemari fame Santhu's next directorial subject titled College Kumar opposite Samyuktha Hegde.

After his successes, Vikky Varun directed and starred Kaalapatthar, playing the lead role of Shankara, an army cook whose life changes after his village builds a black-stone statue in his honour. The film features Dhanya Ramkumar as the female lead, with T. S. Nagabharana and Achyuth Kumar in supporting roles. Kaalapatthar released in 2024

Kaalapatthar is now streaming on SUN NXT and is also available on Amazon Prime

Vikky Varun is currently working on his upcoming film Disco, directed by Hari Santhosh. The project is produced by Pen-n-Paper Studios, Screen 1st Studios, and Kallur Cinemas, with Vikky also contributing to the story.

== Filmography ==
Year	Film	Role	Notes
2013	Kaddipudi	Santhosh	Uncredited role
2015	Kendasampige	Ravindra	Debut in lead role; Nominated – SIIMA Award for Best Male Debut, Nominated – Filmfare Best Debut Actor
2017	College Kumar	Kumar	
2024	Kaalapatthar	Shankara	Directorial debut
