= Tagaru =

2018 Indian-Kannada language action crime film

- Theatrical release poster
- Directed by: Duniya Soori
- Screenplay by: Duniya Soori; Surendranath
- Story by: Duniya Soori; Surendranath
- Produced by: K. P. Srikanth
- Starring: Shiva Rajkumar; Dhananjay; Bhavana; Vasishta N. Simha; Manvitha; Devaraj
- Narrated by: Devaraj
- Cinematography: Mahendra Simha
- Edited by: Deepu S. Kumar
- Music by: Charan Raj
- Production company: Venus Entertainers
- Release date: 23 February 2018
- Running time: 129 minutes
- Country: India
- Language: Kannada

Tagaru (transl. ram - male sheep) is a 2018 Indian Kannada-language action crime film co-written and directed by Duniya Soori and produced by K. P. Srikanth under Venus Entertainers. The film stars Shiva Rajkumar, alongside Dhananjaya, Bhavana, Manvitha Kamath, Vasishta N. Simha and Devaraj. The music was composed by Charan Raj, while cinematography and editing were handled by Mahendra Simha and Deepu. S. Kumar.

The film was officially launched on 22 August 2016 and the first look was released the following day. The project marks the second collaboration between Duniya Soori and Shiva Rajkumar after Kaddipudi.

Tagaru was theatrically released on 23 February 2018 to positive reviews from critics and became one of the highest-grossing Kannada film of 2018. A major chunk of the narrative device was reported to be the main source of inspiration for the template of the tweaked script of the 2021 Telugu film Krack. The film was remade in Tamil as Raid (2023).

== Plot ==
ACP Tagaru Shiva investigates the suicide case of a girl named Tejaswani. The suicide is linked to a notorious gangster Daali and his brother Cockroach; he also investigates a teenager's death, which is orchestrated by Uncle's aide Baby Krishna. Shiva kills Baby at his hideout, and arrests Cockroach, who came to celebrate Baby's birthday, and tortures him, but releases him on bail due to Daali and Uncle's influence.

Shiva meets Panchami through an alliance sent by his superior officer ACP Ramachandra, and they begin to spend time with each other and decide to get married. A cat-and-mouse game ensues between Daali and Shiva, where Shiva kills Cockroach in an encounter. An enraged Daali and his best friend Chittaranjan "Chitte" attack Panchami and Shiva during their morning jog. Shiva and Panchami are admitted to a hospital, where Panchami dies from her injuries, leaving Shiva and Ramachandra devastated.

Seeking vengeance for Panchami's death, Shiva discreetly kills every associates connected to Daali and Chitte, including Chitte and Uncle. Shiva learns that Panchami's sister Punarvasu is arrested by the Goa Police in a raid. He saves and takes her to Ramachandra's house. Daali learns about Shiva's involvement behind the murders and hires a hitman to finish him. The hitman finishes Ramachandra, but he soon gets killed by Shiva. Shiva heads to Daali's birthday bash and kills Daali, thus avenging Panchami's death. In the aftermath of this saga, Shiva heads to investigate another case.

== Cast ==
- Shiva Rajkumar as ACP Shivakumar
- Dhananjay as Daali aka Nimbe
- Bhavana as Panchami, Shiva's fiancée
- Manvitha as Punarvasu, Panchami's younger sister
- Devaraj as ACP Ramachandra, Shiva's mentor
- Vasishta N. Simha as Chittaranjan "Chitte"
- Sudhi as Cockroach, Daali's brother
- Sachidananda Sachu as Don Uncle aka Narayanaswamy
- Devanatha as Baby Krishna
- Poornachandra Mysore as Jamoon Ravi
- Anitha Bhat as Daali's girlfriend
- Triveni Rao as Constable Saroja
- Rockline Sudhakar as Subbi aka Saahiti
- Dileep as Dileepa
- Satyanarayana as Constable Satyanna
- M. N. Lakshmi Devi as Shiva's grandmother

== Production ==
=== Filming ===
On 3 November 2015 an article was published with an announcement that after the success of the crime drama film Kaddipudi in 2013, director Soori would again collaborate with actor Shiva Rajkumar for an action film titled Tagaru. However, it was reported that the film would go on floors only after both of them complete their pending projects. On 22 August 2016, the film was officially launched in Bangalore with all the lead cast being finalized. The first schedule was wrapped up on 26 November 2016. The second schedule began on 12 December and was held in Mysore, Udupi, Gokarna and other coastal areas. From 3 March 2017, the third schedule was filmed with actress Bhavana joining the team.

The first schedule was held in and around Bangalore and Tumkur while the second schedule scenes were canned at Mysore, Mangalore and other coastal belt regions of Karnataka.

=== Casting ===
After finalizing Shiva Rajkumar to play the lead role, producer K. P. Srikanth, a former associate of Kanakapura Srinivas, took up the project to finance. This film marks his second independent film after Shiva which was directed by Om Prakash Rao. Actress Manvitha Harish was selected to play the female lead, marking her second association with Soori after the successful Kendasampige (2015). Later actors Dhananjay and Vasishta N. Simha were signed for antagonist roles. Dhananjay's hairstyle was modified to suit the role. During the third schedule of the shooting, actress Bhavana was signed to play another pivotal character. Veteran actor Devaraj was signed in to play the key supporting character.

== Soundtrack ==
Tagaru

Soundtrack album by Charan Raj
- Released: 2018
- Recorded: 2017
- Genre: Feature film soundtrack
- Label: PRK Audio

Charan Raj chronology
Pushpaka Vimana (2017)	Tagaru (2018)	Dalapathi (2018)
External audio
- Official Audio Jukebox on YouTube

Charan Raj has been signed to compose the score and songs for the film. The lyrics for the songs are written by V. Nagendra Prasad, Yogaraj Bhat and Jayanth Kaikini.

Track list
No.	Title	Lyrics	Singer(s)	Length
1.	"Tagaru Banthu Tagaru"	V. Nagendra Prasad	Anthony Daasan
2.	"Mental Ho Jawa"	Kiran Kaverappa, Vardhik Joseph	Ananya Bhat, Sree Raksha Achar
3.	"Hold on"	Yogaraj Bhat	Ananya Bhat
4.	"Badukina Bannave"	Jayanth Kaikini	Siddharth Belmannu
5.	"Balma"	Jayanth Kaikini	Charan Raj, Siddharth Belmannu
6.	"Jeeva Sakhi"	Jayanth Kaikini	Charan Raj
7.	"Gumma Banda Gumma" (Police Theme)	Jayanth Kaikini	Sanjith Hegde
8.	"Yaare Nee Chature"	Jayanth Kaikini	Varijashree Venugopal

== Release ==
It was reported that for the first time ever, multiplexes across the state of Karnataka are seeing standees of an actor draped in garlands of flowers and money. Outside Karnataka, the film released in Mumbai, Thane, Pune, Sangli, Dudhani, Miraj, Chennai, Coimbatore, Delhi, Hyderabad, Kolkata, Ahmedabad, Chandigarh, Goa and Kasargod. Tagaru was reported to have emerged as the biggest ever Kannada film in the opening weekend outside Karnataka by grossing ₹10 crore (US$1.0 million) in 3 days. The movie was also reported to be the first Kannada movie to be released in both Kenya and Japan

=== Home media ===
The satellite and digital rights were sold to Udaya TV and Sun NXT

== Reception ==
Tagaru received positive reviews from critics.

=== Critical response ===
A. Sharadhaa of The New Indian Express gave 4/5 stars and wrote "Tagaru manages to fall into the classics category, with intense characters, brilliant screenplay, creative cinematography and promising music including the background score playing with the stunts scenes." Mayur Javali of Filmibeat gave 3.5/5 stars and wrote "Duniya Soori has come up with his typical genre of blood, crime and riveting dialogues. Though the story by him is usual, it's his screenplay and dialogue writing which puts him in the limelight. A good watch for the action-lovers and a huge treat for Shivanna's fans."

Shyam Prasad. S of Bangalore Mirror gave 3/5 stars and wrote "Tagaru is a spicy blood pudding. There are few people who hahave a taste for it and this film is not the best advertisement for those who have not tried the dish so far. The film tried to look like a Quentin Tarantino film, but ends up like a Ram Gopal Varma film." Deccan Herald gave 3/5 stars and wrote "A glorious celebration of machismo and underworld gangsta warfare, Tagaru splashes the screen with gut-wrenching gore and bloodshed. This idiom of cinematic narration, ensures novelty and niftyness, certain surefootedness providing Tagaru with the zip and style to be engrossed in it."

While compiling the 25 Greatest Kannada Films of the Decade, Karthik Keramalu of Film Companion wrote "The entire film has uber-cool written all over it, albeit with guns and billhooks. Tagaru is the star-film of the decade (yes it's above K.G.F on the charts)".

== Accolades ==
Award	Category	Recipient	Result	Ref
66th Filmfare Awards South	Best Film	K. P. Srikanth	Nominated	
66th Filmfare Awards South	Best Director	Suri	Nominated	
66th Filmfare Awards South	Best Actor	Shivrajkumar	Nominated	
66th Filmfare Awards South	Best Actress	Manvitha	Won	
66th Filmfare Awards South	Best Supporting Actor	Dhananjay	Won	
66th Filmfare Awards South	Best Music Director	Charanraj	Nominated	
66th Filmfare Awards South	Best Lyricist	Jayant Kaikini ("Badukina Bannave")	Nominated	
66th Filmfare Awards South	Best Playback Singer – Male	Anthony Daasan ("Tagaru Banthu")	Nominated	
66th Filmfare Awards South	Best Playback Singer – Female	Ananya Bhat ("Hold On Hold On")	Nominated	
8th South Indian International Movie Awards	Best Film	Venus Entertainers	Nominated	
8th South Indian International Movie Awards	Best Director	Dooniya Soori	Nominated	
8th South Indian International Movie Awards	Best Actor	Shivrajkumar	Nominated	
8th South Indian International Movie Awards	Best Actress	Manvitha	Nominated	
8th South Indian International Movie Awards	Critics Best Actress	Manvitha	Won	
8th South Indian International Movie Awards	Best Supporting Actor	Vasishta Simha	Nominated	
8th South Indian International Movie Awards	Best Supporting Actress	Bhavana	Nominated	
8th South Indian International Movie Awards	Best Actor in a Negative Role	Dhananjay	Won	
8th South Indian International Movie Awards	Best Music Director	Charanraj	Nominated	
8th South Indian International Movie Awards	Best Playback Singer- Male	Anthony Daasan ("Tagaru Banthu")	Nominated	
8th South Indian International Movie Awards	Best Playback Singer – Female	Ananya Bhat ("Hold On Hold On")	Won	
8th South Indian International Movie Awards	Best Cinematographer	Mahendra Simmha	Nominated	
11th Bengaluru International Film Festival	Third most popular Kannada film	Duniya Soori; KP Srikanth	Won	

== Possible sequel ==
Soori had revealed that there would be a sequel to Tagaru even before the film was released while shooting the end credits of the film at the Bandi Makalamma temple. Sreekanth also gave the go-ahead for the sequel and the team even had the muhurath done with a simple puja.

== Remake ==
The copyrights of the Tamil remake version were sold to Tamil director M. Muthaiya who has signed to remake the film with Vikram Prabhu reprising Shiva Rajkumar's role titled Raid (2023), but Muthaiya only wrote the dialogues and the film was directed by debutant director Karthi.
