= Kendasampige =

- Directed by: Duniya Soori
- Screenplay by: Duniya Soori; Rajesh Nataranga; Maasthi Upparahalli
- Story by: Surendranath
- Produced by: Parimala Film Factory
- Starring: Vikky Varun; Manvitha Harish; Rajesh Nataranga; Prakash Belawadi; Chandrika; Sheethal Shetty
- Cinematography: Satya Hegde
- Edited by: Deepu S. Kumar
- Music by: V. Harikrishna
- Production company: Parimala Film Factory
- Distributed by: RS Films
- Release date: 11 September 2015
- Running time: 99 minutes
- Country: India
- Language: Kannada

Kendasampige (transl. Golden champaca) is a 2015 Indian Kannada-language crime thriller film directed by Duniya Soori from a story written by Surendranath and produced by Parimala Film Factory. The film stars Vikky Varun and Manvita Kamath, Rajesh Nataranga, Prakash Belawadi and Chandrika. The film is the sequel to forthcoming film Kaage Bangara and also exposes the nexus between the latter and influential persons. V. Harikrishna composed the soundtrack and background score, while the cinematography and editing were handled by Satya Hegde and Deepu. S. Kumar.

Kendasampigewas released on 11 September 2015 to positive reviews from critics who praised its screenwriting and bringing forth a dirty web of drug trade, mafia, dirty cops and a questionable judicial system. The film became a commercial success at the box office. Duniya Soori had initially announced that the film will have a prequel titled Kaage Bangara and a sequel titled Black Magic, but Kaage Bangara was stalled owing to demonetization since the director felt that the storyline was no more relevant after issue of new currency notes. However, Soori revived Kaage Bangara after the 2020 film Popcorn Monkey Tiger, which served as a link between Kendasampige and Kaage Bangara.

== Plot ==
Ravindra, a middle class attendant, works in a company headed by Shakuntala Shetty. Shakuntala's daughter Gowri and Ravindra fall in love with each other and begin dating, but Ravindra is booked in a drug case and he unknowingly kills SI Govindaraju and escapes. While on the run, Ravindra informs Gowri about the incident. Gowri helps Ravindra with money and accompanies him through the journey.

Meanwhile, ACP S. Purandar begins an investigation against Ravindra and finds that the "deceased" Govindaraju is actually a goon Coffee Appaiah. Purandar tracks down Appaiah and learns that Appaiah had faked himself as Govindaraju and also faked his death under the orders of DCP Suryakanth and Shakuntala Shetty to trap Ravindra as Shakuntala learnt about Ravindra and Gowri's relationship. Ravindra and Gowri move to many cities day by day, where they are chased by two dirty cops Narayanaswamy and Chandrashekhar, who are working for Suryakanth, after they witness the murder of the real Govindaraju.

Purandar investigates the matter and learns that Suryakanth, Govindaraju, Narayanaswamy and Chandrashekhar orchestrated a drug raid in Mangalore. They sold the drugs to another party for ₹40 crore and secretly hidden the money in a safe place. A drunk Govindaraju made nasty comments on Suryakanth, who secretly heard the recording. Govindaraju learnt that Suryakanth heard his conversation and escaped out of fear. Suryakanth learnt that the money was missing and told Narayanaswamy and Chandrashekhar to capture Govindaraju and bring the money. Govindaraju was found later by Narayanaswamy and Chandrashekhar. Purandar realizes that Ravindra and Gowri will be killed after they become witness to Govindaraju's murder, where he secretly tracks them down.

Purandar drags Ravindra and shoots him, while Gowri gets saved through a written statement by Suryakanth. Gowri gets devastated about Ravindra's death and returns home. After the incident, Purandar reveals that he faked Ravindra's death and sent him to Mumbai after he revealed to Ravindra about Shakuntala's involvement to frame him in a drug case and Suryakanth's involvement to kill him and Gowri for witnessing Govindaraju's murder. At Mumbai, Ravindra works as a bar supplier, where he calls Gowri and reveals about his existence, much to Gowri's happiness. It is actually revealed that the money, which was hidden by Suryakanth, was actually stolen by a cheater Haav Rani, (Note: His name is revealed in Popcorn Monkey Tiger.) who is now happily settled and living a rich life in Mumbai.

== Cast ==
- Vikky Varun (credited as Vikky) as Ravindra
- Manvitha Harish as Gowri Shetty
- Rajesh Nataranga as ACP S. Purandar
- Prakash Belawadi as DCP Suryakanth
- Chandrika as Shakuntala Shetty
- Sheethal Shetty as Anitha, Purandar's wife
- Shwetha Pandit as Nisha, a Mangalore-based drug lord
- Prashanth Siddi as Haav Rani
- Chandrashekar S. as Inspector Chandrashekar
- Narayana Swamy as Inspector Narayana Swamy

== Production ==
In December 2013, the film was reported to be titled Kendasampige featuring newcomers. The lead cast was revealed to be Santosh Reva (rechristened as Vikky Varun) and Mangalore-based Shwetha Kamath (rechristened as Manvitha Harish) in the latter half of 2014. Vikky Varun had previously worked as an assistant director to Duniya Soori, and had played a minor role in Kaddipudi (2013) upon Soori's advice. Soori cast Manvitha Harish since she was good at long distance driving and knew various dialects of Kannada, which was crucial for the film since it involved a lot of travelling.

== Soundtrack ==
Kendasampige

Soundtrack album by V. Harikrishna
- Released: 26 July 2015
- Genre: Feature film soundtrack
- Length: 14:07
- Label: D Beats
- Producer: V. Harikrishna

V. Harikrishna composed the film score and the soundtrack for the film, lyrics for which was penned by Jayant Kaikini and Yogaraj Bhat. The soundtrack album consists of four tracks. The album was launched on 26 July 2015 in Bangalore in the presence of Soori's forthcoming film Doddmane Hudga team, including actors Puneeth Rajkumar and Radhika Pandit. Actors V. Ravichandran and Duniya Vijay were other invitees.

=== Track listing ===
No.	Title	Lyrics	Singer(s)	Length
1.	"Nenape Nithya Mallige"	Jayant Kaikini	Karthik	3:12
2.	"Kanasali Nadesu"	Jayant Kaikini	Shweta Mohan	3:34
3.	"Ilijaaru Haadi Idu"	Yogaraj Bhat	Vijay Prakash	3:39
4.	"Mareyade Kshamisu"	Jayant Kaikini	Balaram	3:42
Total length:				14:07

== Release and reception ==
The film was initially scheduled to release on 4 September 2015, but was delayed by to 11 September 2015 to avoid clashing with RX Soori (2015).

=== Critical response ===
Sunayana Suresh of The Times of India gave 4/5 stars and wrote "Suri's Quentin Tarantino-meets-Guy Ritchie-meets-Ram Gopal Varma tale impresses and how. The maker has tied the beginning with the end, as he promises the viewers that they can look forward to Kaage Bangara next year."

S. Shyam Prasad of Bangalore Mirror gave 4/5 stars and wrote "Kendasampige is a masterful surprise by director Suri. Setting aside the question of whether he thrives only when he handles newcomers, this film will stand notches above his Duniya and Inthi Ninna Preethiya. The rough edges of his other films like Junglee and Jackie have vanished and here is a film that is near-perfect".

Y. Maheshwara Reddy of DNA gave 4/5 stars and wrote "Director Suri, who did a commendable job in his previous films Duniya and Inthi Ninna Preethiya some years ago, deserves appreciation for ensuring that the screenplay in this film is crisp. It may not be an exaggeration to say that this film is one of the best movies directed by Suri."
