= Vikas (actor) =

Indian actor

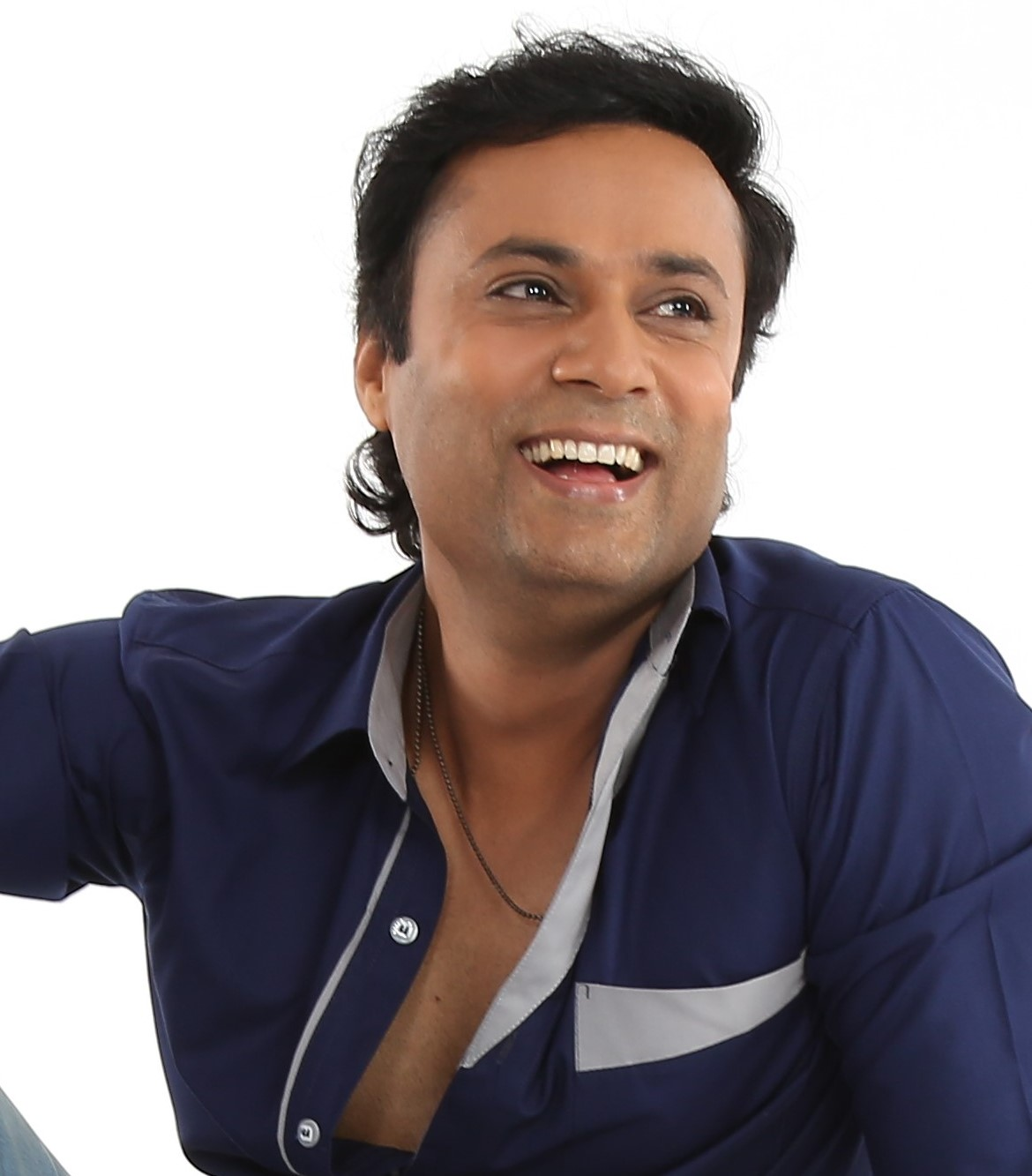
- Vikas in 2017
- Born: 9 February; Bangalore, Karnataka, India
- Occupations: Actor, writer, film director, editor
- Years active: 2002–present

Vikas (born 9 February) is an Indian actor, director, writer and editor, who works in Kannada cinema and television.

== Career ==
Vikas made his film debut with the film Nandhi starring Sudeep where he plays Sudeep's friend. He also an acted in television soaps such as Kadambari and Gupta Gamini. He worked as an assistant director in television serials, fell in love with the editing, and became an editor starting with the serial Sadhane, which was directed by Duniya Soori.

He assisted director Duniya Soori for Jackie (2010) where he also played the role of the antagonist in the movie. He assisted the filmmaker Yogaraj Bhat and co-wrote the film Drama where he was credited for writing the screenplay. He directed Jayammana Maga starring Duniya Vijay, which went on to become a blockbuster. The subject dealt with occult and black magic. The response from critics was equally good. The Times of India rated it a 3.5/5 and said, "Vikas has proved that he can be a part of the list of talented directors in Sandalwood". He has played a character role in Kaddipudi.

In 2020, he acted in the fantasy film Kaanadante Maayavadanu. He has penned the story along with the debutante director Raj Pathipati.

== Filmography ==
Key
†	Denotes films that have not yet been released

Year	Film	Role	Notes	Ref
2002	Nandhi	Nandhi's friend		
2004	Bisi Bisi	Vikky		
2008	Inthi Ninna Preethiya	Namana's brother		
2010	Jackie	Parangi Seena		
2011	Jarasandha	News Anchor		
2013	Kaddipudi	Friday Hanumantu		
2013	Jayammana Maga		Also director; cameo appearance Nominated–SIIMA Award for Best Debut Director – Kannada	
2019	DK Bose	Cop		
2019	Kaanadante Maayavadanu	Rummy	Also co-writer	

=== As director and writer ===
Year	Title	Credited as		Notes	Ref
Year	Title	Director	Writer	Notes	Ref
2012	Drama	No	Screenplay	credited as Ravikiran	
2013	Jayammana Maga	Yes	Screenplay		
2016	Doddmane Hudga	No	Story		
2019	Kaanadante Maayavadanu	No	Story		
2024	Karataka Damanaka	No	Yes		
