= Kaalapatthar =

2024 Indian action drama film

- Theatrical release poster
- Directed by: Vicky Varun
- Written by: D. Satya Prakash
- Produced by: Bhuvan Suresh; Nagaraju Billinakote
- Starring: Vicky Varun; Dhanya Ramkumar
- Cinematography: Sandeep Kumar
- Edited by: Deepu S. Kumar
- Music by: J. Anoop Seelin
- Production company: Bhuvan Movies
- Release date: 13 September 2024
- Running time: 113 minutes
- Country: India
- Language: Kannada

Kaalapatthar is a 2024 Indian Kannada-language thriller drama film directed by Vicky Varun in his directorial debut. The film was produced by Bhuvan Suresh and Nagaraju Billinakote under the banner of Bhuvan Movies. The film stars Vicky Varun and Dhanya Ramkumar, alongside T. S. Nagabharana, Achyuth Kumar, and Sampath Maitreya in supporting roles.

The film was released theatrically on 13 September 2024 to positive reviews from critics.

== Cast ==
- Vicky Varun as Shankara
- Dhanya Ramkumar as Ganga
- T. S. Nagabharana
- Achyuth Kumar
- Sampath Maitreya
- Rajesh Nataranga
- Gilli Nata
- Basu Hiremath
- Kanthraj Kaddipudi

== Production ==
=== Development ===
The film was written by D. Satya Prakash. In January 2021, the project was announced with newcomer Chethan as director and Apoorva, who debuted in the 2016 film Apoorva, and Vicky Varun as the lead actors. However, due to the COVID-19 pandemic, the film was temporarily shelved. Following the pandemic's easing, Vicky Varun took over as director, leveraging his experience as an assistant director under Duniya Suri and Yogaraj Bhat. In January 2022, Vicky narrated the story to Dhanya Ramkumar, who made her debut as a lead actress in Ninna Sanihake, and she subsequently joined the project. The film's crew officially announced her involvement in February 2022. Dhanya Ramkumar played the lead role of Ganga, a village girl, replacing Apoorva.

=== Filming ===
Principal photography took place in various locations across Karnataka, primarily in Jainapur village, Bijapur district. A few portions were shot in Kashmir and Rajasthan. On 23 April 2022, it was reported that the talkie portions of the film were completed. Additionally, filming for the songs commenced on 16 August 2022.

== Soundtrack ==
Kaalapatthar

Soundtrack album by J. Anoop Seelin
- Released: 2024
- Genre: Feature film soundtrack
- Length: 10:11
- Language: Kannada
- Label: A2 Music
- Producer: J. Anoop Seelin

J. Anoop Seelin chronology
Mafia (2024)	Kaalapatthar (2024)

The soundtrack was composed by J. Anoop Seelin. The soundtrack features songs written by V. Nagendra Prasad and Pramod Maravanthe.

Track listing
No.	Title	Lyrics	Singer(s)	Length
1.	"Gorukana Gaana"	V. Nagendra Prasad	Shivani Naveen, Jyothi Vyasraj, Manasa Holla, Harsha Ranjini	3:24
2.	"Nanna Vihaara"	Pramod Maravanthe	Sai Vignesh	3:17
3.	"Kaalapatthar"	Pramod Maravanthe	Abhishek M R	—
4.	"Maatade Tangaali"	Pramod Maravanthe	Siddhartha Belmannu	—
5.	"Bandli Stove"	Pramod Maravanthe	Vijay Prakash	3:30
Total length:				10:11

== Release ==
The film was released theatrically on 13 September 2024.

== Reception ==
Sridevi S of The Times of India rated the film three-and-a-half out of five stars and wrote that "Both story and screenplay are tight, but towards the end, the movie probably needed a banger scene, just to elevate the commercial experience. Songs have been placed well, adding to the storyline instead of being yet another standalone." Shashiprasad SM of Times Now gave it three-and-a-half out of five stars and wrote, "A thriller of a kind with a unique story and storytelling, Kaalapatthar offers a fresh experience to the audience."

Sunayana Suresh of The South First gave it three out of five stars and wrote, "Kaalapatthar is a quirky film that is different from the regular underworld-based commercial fare and that itself is its biggest merit. The bonus is that it manages to entertain the audience decently." A. Sharadhaa of Cinema Express gave the film a positive review and wrote that "Despite its strengths, the film encounters some hurdles, particularly in its portrayal of Shankara's inner turmoil. The buildup to his obsession feels somewhat underdeveloped, missing an opportunity to heighten the dramatic tension."

Vivek M. V. of The Hindu wrote that "The film jumps from one conflict to another without a break, and you get the feeling that it ends without a bang. The transitions in the screenplay seem too quick, giving us less time to process the twists in the movie. Yet, the film’s story, as a whole, is rock solid."
