= Amara Premi Arun =

2025 Indian Kannada film

- Theatrical release poster
- Directed by: Praveen Kumar G
- Written by: Praveen Kumar G
- Starring: Harisharvaa; Deepika Aradhya; Dharmanna Kadur; Krithi Bhat
- Cinematography: Praveen S.
- Edited by: Manu Shedgar
- Music by: Kiran Ravindranath
- Release date: 25 April 2025
- Running time: 144 minutes
- Country: India
- Language: Kannada

Amara Premi Arun is a 2025 Indian Kannada-language romantic drama film written and directed by Praveen Kumar G. It stars Harisharvaa and Deepika Aradhya in lead roles, with Dharmanna Kadur and Krithi Bhat in supporting roles. The film was released theatrically on 25 April 2025. It is noted for incorporating the local dialect of Ballari.

== Plot ==
Arun is a medical representative from Ballari who faces pressure from his family to marry, but he remains attached to his childhood friend Kavya. Assisted by his friend Seena, he sets out to find her, revisiting old haunts such as bus stops, post offices and schools. He learns that Kavya has been missing for several months, which forces him to confront whether love is about holding on to memories or letting go.

== Cast ==
- Harisharvaa as Arun
- Deepika Aradhya as Kavya
- Dharmanna Kadur as Seena
- Krithi Bhat as Rashmi
- Mahesh Bung as Vinod
- Ranjitha Puttaswamy as Nirmala
- Archana Kottige in a special appearance

== Production ==
Amara Premi Arun marked the directorial debut of Praveen Kumar G. The film was shot in and around Ballari, with dialogues written in the regional dialect. Lyrics were penned by Yogaraj Bhat, Jayanth Kaikini, and Praveen Kumar.

== Release ==
The film was released in Karnataka on 25 April 2025. It received a U certificate and has a runtime of 144 minutes.

== Reception ==
=== Critical response ===
The Times of India gave the film a rating of 2.5/5, describing it as formulaic and slow-paced despite sincere moments.

The New Indian Express rated the film 3/5, calling it a "nostalgic love letter to old-school romance," praising its sincerity and setting while noting its familiar story arc.

Bangalore Mirror described it as "a close peek into Ballari life," commending its cultural specificity while noting its restrained narrative.
