= Manvita Kamath =

Indian actress

- Born: 13 April 1992 (age 34); Mangalore, Karnataka, India
- Occupations: Actress, Radio host, Founder of Studio Manekin
- Years active: 2014–present
- Spouses: Arun (m. 2024)

Manvita Kamath is an Indian actress who primarily works in Kannada films. She began her career as a radio jockey at Radio Mirchi and made her acting debut with Kendasampige (2015). Her performance in Tagaru (2018), earned her the Filmfare Award for Best Actress – Kannada.

== Early life ==
Manvita Kamath, previously known as Manvita Harish aka Shwetha Kamath, was born to Harish Kamath and Sujatha Kamath in Mangalore. She was raised in Kalasa of Chikmagalur until SSLC, and then pursued her PU and degree in Sharada PU College and graduated in Journalism, Animation, and English literature from St. Aloysius College, Mangalore. She pursued her Masters in Journalism, Media Studies and International Communication from Jain CMS University, Bangalore. She worked for more than a year in Radio Mirchi, Mangalore where she hosted a show named Khiladi 983.

== Career ==
A contact recommended Manvita to Duniya Soori, and she was called for the auditions of Kendasampige, where she was selected for the lead role. Apart from her acting skills, she possessed qualities that Duniya Soori was looking for in his lead– such as the ability to drive long distances and know Kannada thoroughly. Manvita Harish was well versed in Mangalore Kannada, Malnad Kannada, Dharwad Kannada, and Bengaluru Kannada, which became an advantage. Manvita Harish had been involved in theaters since childhood. She was part of the folk drama troupe of the Late Mr.Bhaskar Nelliteertha. She was also the secretary of Kannada Sangha in college. This was a reason she decided to take film as her career. Her co-star in the film was Vicky Varun as Gowri Shetty. They went on to become a success commercially. Her next work was the commercial hit movie Tagaru, directed by Duniya Suri paired with Hatrick Hero Shiva Rajkumar. Manvita Kamath founded Studio Manèkin, an animation and pre-visualization studio, in 2020 alongside Netherlands-based animator and NIE graduate Ankita Khini. She also launched Manèkin, a luxury clothing brand, in collaboration with Soumya SK—an alumnus of Instituto Marangoni—who serves as the brand’s Creative Director.

== Personal life ==
Manvita tied the knot with music producer Arun in her hometown Kalasa on 1 May 2024. Married in Kalasa temple as per the wish of her late mother Sujatha, a traditional Konkani-themed wedding.

== Filmography ==
| † | Denotes films that have not yet been released |

| Year | Film | Role | Notes | Ref. |
|---|---|---|---|---|
| 2015 | Kendasampige | Gowri Shetty | | |
| 2017 | Chowka | Ramya | Cameo appearance | |
| 2018 | Kanaka | Kanasu | | |
| 2018 | Tagaru | Punarvasu | | |
| 2018 | Tarakaasura | Muttamma | | |
| 2019 | Relax Satya | Maya | | |
| 2020 | India vs England | Medini | | |
| 2022 | Shiva 143 | Madhu | | |
| 2024 | Appa I Love You | Kavya | | |
| 2025 | Bad | | | |
| TBA | Rajasthan Diaries† | Siri | Completed; Kannada-Marathi bilingual film | |
| TBA | Happily Married† | TBA | Completed | |

== Television ==
| Year | Show | Role | Language | Ref |
|---|---|---|---|---|
| 2020 | Kannadathi | Herself | Kannada | |
| 2023 | Antarapata | Herself | Kannada | |

== Awards and honours ==
| Film | Awards | Category | Result | References |
|---|---|---|---|---|
| Kendasampige | 5th SIIMA Awards | Best Debutant Actress -Kannada | Won | |
| Tagaru | 66th Filmfare Awards South | Best Actress– Kannada | Won | |
| Tagaru | TSR TV9 Film Award | Special Jury Award for Best Actress– Kannada | Won | |
| Tagaru | 8th SIIMA Awards | Best Actress -Kannada | Nominated | |
| Tagaru | 8th SIIMA Awards | Critics Best Actress | Won | |
| Tagaru | Filmibeat Award | Best Actress | Nominated | |
| Tagaru | City Cine Award | Best Actress | Nominated | |
