= Prashanth Siddi =

Indian Kannada film actor

- Occupation: Actor
- Years active: 2011-present

Prashanth Siddi is an Indian actor who works in Kannada-language films. As of August 2020, he has appeared in seventy films.

== Career ==
Coming from a lower income background, Prashanth Siddi was selected by Chidambar Rao Jambe to work in the theatre group Ninasam. He made his film debut with Paramathma in a supporting role. He played minor roles in several films including Drishya and Lucia before playing a cheater in Duniya Soori's Kendasampige. He was signed to play the lead roles in Pantru and Vyapthi Pradeshada Horagiddare, both of which are yet to release. He also was to play the lead role in Soori's Kaage Bangaara; however, the project was later dropped.

== Personal life ==
Prashanth Siddi is of Siddi descent.

== Filmography ==
- Paramathma (2011)
- Anna Bond (2012)
- Lucia (2013)
- Chandralekha (2014)
- Gajakesari (2014)
- Drishya (2014)
- Vaastu Prakaara (2015)
- Bullet Basya (2015)
- RX Soori (2015)
- Kendasampige (2015)
- Plus (2015)
- Kathe Chitrakathe Nirdeshana Puttanna (2016)
- Luv U Alia (2016)
- Kalpana 2 (2016)
- Santheyalli Nintha Kabira (2016)
- Happy Birthday (2016)
- Prema Geema Jaane Do (2016)
- Doddmane Hudga (2016)
- Jaguar (2016; also in Telugu)
- John Jani Janardhan (2016)
- Sojiga (2016)
- Trigger (2017)
- Beautiful Manasugalu (2017)
- First Love (2017)
- College Kumar (2017)
- Womens Day (2017)
- O Premave (2018)
- Bhootayyana Mommaga Ayyu (2018)
- A + (2018)
- Paradesi C/o London (2018)
- Kaddu Mucchi (2019)
- Vajra Kavachadhara Govinda (2019; Telugu)
- Gara (2019)
- Gentleman (2020)
- Popcorn Monkey Tiger (2020)
- Mugilpete (2021)
- Ombattane Dikku (2022) as Chintaka
- Nano Narayanappa (2022) as Charlie
- Not Out (2024)
- Maarigallu (2025)
