= Bal Dani =

Indian cricketer

Personal information
- Full name: Hemchandra Tukaram Dani
- Born: 24 May 1933; Dudhani, British India
- Died: 19 December 1999 (aged 66); Nashik, Maharashtra, India
- Batting: Right-handed
- Bowling: Right-arm fast-medium, off-break, leg-break

International information
- National side: India
- Only Test (cap 65): 13 November 1952 v Pakistan

Career statistics
Competition	Test	First-class
Matches	1	116
Runs scored	–	6,476
Batting average	–	44.35
100s/50s	–	17/34
Top score	–	170*
Balls bowled	60	12,183
Wickets	1	200
Bowling average	19.00	21.90
5 wickets in innings	0	4
10 wickets in match	0	0
Best bowling	1/9	7/50
Catches/stumpings	1/–	79/–
- Source: ESPNcricinfo, 5 July 2024

Hemachandra Tukaram "Bal" Dani (24 May 1933 – 19 December 1999) was an Indian Test cricketer.

Bal Dani was predominantly a right-handed batsman. He could also bowl medium pace and later turned to off and leg breaks. His only Test match was against Pakistan in 1952/53. India won the game losing only four wickets, and Dani did not get a chance to bat and took a single wicket off his 10 overs. Only 19 at the time, his opening partner was the 41-year-old Lala Amarnath. He toured Pakistan in 1954/55 without appearing in a Test match.

He did his schooling at Rungta High School, Nashik. Contemporary cricketer Bapu Nadkarni also attended the same school. He held a B.A. (Hons) degree. His early first class career was with Maharashtra but he moved to Services after joining the Indian Air Force in 1956. He rose to become an Air Commodore and retired in 1987.

He hit 17 centuries and took 200 wickets in his career. He captained Services for several years. He played most of his good cricket well after his Test career. After he retired, he was a national selector from 1968 to 1975. He was the manager, selector and coach of Maharashtra's Ranji Trophy side between 1989 and 1997. He was involved with the charity organisation Sneha Seva in Pune.

== See also ==
- One Test Wonder
