= Raid (2023 film) =

- Theatrical Release Poster
- Directed by: Karthi
- Screenplay by: Muthaiya; Karthi
- Based on: Tagaru (2018) by Duniya Soori
- Produced by: S. K. Kanishk; G. Manikannan
- Starring: Vikram Prabhu; Sri Divya
- Cinematography: Kathiravan
- Edited by: Manimaran
- Music by: Sam C. S.
- Production companies: M Studios; Open Screen Studios; G Pictures
- Release date: 10 November 2023
- Running time: 122 minutes
- Country: India
- Language: Tamil

Raid is a 2023 Tamil-language action thriller film directed by Karthi in his directorial debut. It is a remake of the 2018 Kannada film Tagaru starring Shiva Rajkumar. The film stars Vikram Prabhu, Sri Divya, Ananthika Sanilkumar and Rishi Rithvik. Sam C. S. composed the music, while the cinematography and editing were handled by Kathiravan and Manimaran.

Raid was released on 10 November 2023 during Diwali weekend to negative reviews from critics.

== Plot ==
Inspector Prabhakaran sets on a crusade to finish all gangsters in the city of Chennai, where he locks horns with Daali and Chitte, who are ruthless gangster controlling the city's market with the influence of their boss Uncle. While on a police operation to encounter Uncle's aid Baby, Prabhakaran captures Daali's brother Cockroach and kils him in an encounter. Enraged, Daali, Chitte and his men shoots Prabhakaran during his morning jog, where Prabhakaran's fiancèe Venba gets killed in a crossfire. Distraught about Venba's death, Prabhakaran begins hunting down and killing Daali's associates, including Chitte. Prabhakaran learns that Venba's sister Venmathi is caught by the Goa Police during a raid, where he saves Venmathi. Learning that Prabhakaran is targeting him, Daali sends a hitman to finish Prabhakaran, but Prabhakaran manages to kill the hitmen and crashes into Daali's birthday bash. Prabhakaran and Daali engage in a hand-to-hand combat, where Prabhakaran finally kills Daali, thus avenging Venba's death. In the aftermath, Prabhakaran goes to solve another case.

== Cast ==
- Vikram Prabhu as Inspector Prabhakaran
- Sri Divya as Venba
- Ananthika Sanilkumar as Venmathi
- Velu Prabhakaran as Don Uncle alias Narayanasamy
- Selva as Prabhakaran's father
- Rishi Rithvik as Daali
- Soundararaja as Chitti
- Daniel Annie Pope as Cockroach
- George Maryan as Police officer
- Hareesh Peradi
- Swaminathan
- Jeeva Ravi
- Kannan Ponnaiya
- Anil Kumar

== Production ==
Following the success of Tagaru (2018), the copyrights of the Tamil remake version were sold to Tamil director M. Muthaiya who has signed to remake the movie with Vikram Prabhu. Sri Divya was signed on to play the leading roles, which marks Vikram Prabhu's second collaboration with Sri Divya after Vellaikaara Durai (2014). It also marked the first film project for Sri Divya in four years after her last Tamil film Sangili Bungili Kadhava Thorae (2017). Tamil remake is titled as Raid.

== Music ==
The soundtrack and background score was composed by Sam C. S., while the lyrics were written by Mohan Rajan. The audio label was sold by Saregama.

No.	Title	Lyrics	Singer(s)	Length
1.	"Enta Maatatha"	Mohan Rajan	Sam C. S., Sivam	3:27
2.	"Azhagu Chellam"	Mohan Rajan	Haricharan, Bhuvana Ananth	4:16
3.	"Ayyo Kaiyo"	Mohan Rajan	Ranina Reddy	3:18
Total length:				11:01

== Release and reception ==
Raid was released on 10 November 2023 during Diwali weekend.

M. Suganth of from The Times of India gave 1.5/5 stars and wrote that "This is the kind of Tamil film that doesn't even pause for a moment to consider the many extra-judicial killings that its protagonist does". A critic from Vikatan wrote that all in all, this 'raid' keeps you running in search of a headache balm of hitting someone in the name of screenplay, speaking ridiculous lines, then putting on a song and doing the same thing over and over again.
