= Golmaal Radhakrishna =

- VCD cover
- Directed by: Sai Prakash
- Written by: Sai Prakash
- Produced by: K. Chidambara Shetty
- Starring: Ananth Nag; Vanitha Vasu; Chandrika
- Cinematography: J.G. Krishna
- Edited by: K. Narasaiah
- Music by: M. Ranga Rao
- Production company: Chitra Productions
- Release date: 1990
- Running time: 131 minutes
- Country: India
- Language: Kannada

Golmaal Radhakrishna is a 1990 Indian Kannada-lamguage comedy film directed and written by Om Sai Prakash. The film starred Anant Nag in the title role along with Chandrika and Vanitha Vasu in leading roles. The music of the film was composed by M. Ranga Rao.

Produced by K. Chidambara Shetty under Chitra Productions banner, the film was released in 1990 and met with positive response from critics and audience. The film was a remake of Telugu film Chalaki Mogudu Chadastapu Pellam.

== Cast ==
- Ananth Nag as Gopalakrishna
- Chandrika as Radha
- Vanitha Vasu as Sandhya
- Leelavathi as Radha's grandmother
- Mukhyamantri Chandru as Shankar
- Srilalitha as Gowri
- Dinesh as police inspector
- Mysore Lokesh as a singer
- Umashree as Janaki
- Sihi Kahi Chandru as Prasad
- M. S. Umesh as Seetapathi
- Satyabhama as Yellavva
- Bangalore Nagesh
- Kokila
- Prathima
- Sheela
- Vijayalakshmi
- Bank Janardhan (uncredited)

== Soundtrack ==
The film's soundtrack was composed by M. Ranga Rao.

| Track# | Song | Singer(s) | Lyrics |
|---|---|---|---|
| 1 | "Shambo Linga" | Mano, B. R. Chaya | R. N. Jayagopal |
| 2 | "Prayakke" | Mano, B. R. Chaya | R. N. Jayagopal |
| 3 | "Muthanu Kelabeda" | Mano, B. R. Chaya | R. N. Jayagopal |
| 4 | "Apsareyu Bandu" | Mano, B. R. Chaya | R. N. Jayagopal |
| 5 | "Kaiya Hididu" | Mano, B. R. Chaya | R. N. Jayagopal |

== Sequels ==
A sequel to this film titled Golmaal Radhakrishna-2 was released in 1991 by Sai Prakash with Anant Nag and Chandrika reprising their roles. Actress Tara and Vanitha Vasu were also seen in the prominent roles. Much of the cast and crew were repeated in the sequel too barring the music director Ranga Rao replaced by Upendra Kumar.

| Track# | Song | Singer(s) | Lyrics |
|---|---|---|---|
| 1 | "Jeevana Ee Jeevana" | SPB, Manjula, Kusuma, Chorus | R. N. Jayagopal |
| 2 | "Fashion Model Aagale" | S. Janaki | R. N. Jayagopal |
| 3 | "Krishna Krishna O Radha Krishna" | SPB, Manjula, Kusuma, Chorus | R. N. Jayagopal |
| 4 | "Amavaasye Arda Rathri Idu" | S. Janaki | R. N. Jayagopal |

Samsaaradalli Golmaal, another sequel by Sai Prakash starring different actors followed in 2012, being a remake of the 2007 Telugu film Aadivaram Adavallaku Selavu.
