= Love Seasons (2026 film) =

2026 Indian Kannada language film

- Poster
- Directed by: Kruthvik
- Written by: Kruthvik
- Produced by: NR Manjunatha
- Starring: Mukunda Ramaswami; Diya Keerthi Chandana Gowda Shwetha Koglur
- Cinematography: Avinaasha Shastry
- Edited by: Madhu Thumbakere
- Music by: Veer Samarth
- Production company: NR Studios
- Distributed by: MP Films
- Release date: 3 July 2026
- Running time: 145 Minutes
- Country: India
- Language: Kannada

Love Seasons is a 2026 Indian Kannada language film written and directed by Kruthvik. The film stars Mukunda Ramaswami, Diya Keerthi, Chandana Gowda, Shwetha Koglur, Mandya Ramesh, Rajesh Nataranga, Sangeetha Anil, Jayathirtha, Chetan Durga and Huli Karthik in the lead role. The movie is streaming now on amazon prime video

== Plot ==
Loveseasons follows the emotional journey of Raam, a 24-year-old dreamer caught between responsibilities and ambitions. Struggling to build a future while carrying the weight of promises and expectations, his life takes an unexpected turn after a commitment to marriage changes the course of his destiny.

During his journey toward achieving his dreams, Raam encounters an unnamed stranger to whom he gradually opens his heart, unfolding the untold chapters of his past. Through his memories emerge three women, each symbolizing a different season of life — bringing love, pain, growth, passion, heartbreak, and transformation. Every relationship leaves behind emotions that shape the man he becomes.

At its core, Loveseasons is a story about hope — a simple word with the power to heal lives or destroy hearts. As Raam navigates betrayal, broken trust, emotional consequences, and the backlash of shattered promises, he is forced to confront the true meaning of love, responsibility, and destiny.

Blending romance, philosophy, and emotional drama, the film explores how seasons change in nature just as relationships change within life. Through every storm and every sunrise, Raam’s journey ultimately leads him toward fulfillment, where dreams, love, and family finally come together in the most beautiful way.

== Cast ==
- Mukunda Ramaswami as Raam
- Diya Keerthi as Mary
- Chandana Gowda as Pavithra
- Shwetha Koglur as Rashika
- Rajesh Nataranga as Peter
- Mandya Ramesh as Prasad
- Sangeetha Anil as Maria
- Jayathirtha as Himself
- Chethan Durga as Durga
- Huli Karthik as Huli

== Reception ==
Susmita Sameera of The Times of India said that "Love Seasons has its share of technical shortcomings, but its emotional core and positive message make it a decent one-time watch for audiences who enjoy melodramatic romantic dramas." Sharadhaa of the Cinema Express said that "The film may not reinvent the romance drama, but it tells a familiar story with uncommon empathy. More importantly, Kruthvik Shetty announces himself as a filmmaker who values emotional honesty over formula." Y. Maheswara Reddy of the Bangalore Mirror said that "Songs are good and music by Veer Samarth is catchy. The movie is worth a watch for youngsters."
