= Inthi Ninna Preethiya =

- VCD cover
- Directed by: Duniya Soori
- Written by: Duniya Soori
- Produced by: Duniya Soori; Yogaraj Bhat
- Starring: Srinagar Kitty; Bhavana; Sonu
- Cinematography: Satya Hegde
- Edited by: Deepu S. Kumar
- Music by: Sadhu Kokila
- Production company: Suri Talkies
- Release date: 29 February 2008
- Running time: 134 minutes
- Country: India
- Language: Kannada

Inthi Ninna Preethiya (transl. Yours beloved) is a 2008 Indian Kannada-language drama film written, directed and co-produced by Duniya Soori. The film's plot revolves around a family which struggles due to the bad effects of alcohol addiction.

The film features Srinagar Kitty (credited as Krishna), Bhavana and newcomer Sonu Gowda in pivotal roles. The film score and soundtrack were composed by Sadhu Kokila. The cinematography was done by Suri's previous associate Satya Hegde and was edited by Deepu S. Kumar.

The film was released on 29 February 2008 to mixed reviews from the critics. While the cinematography, music direction and art director received praises, the film's screenplay and direction was criticized for glorifying the alcoholism. The film was declared a musical hit with its soundtrack hitting high on popularity. For the year 2008–09, the film bagged the Karnataka State Film Awards for the Best Music (Sadhu Kokila) and Best Female Playback Singer (Vani Harikrishna).

== Plot ==
Rajeev (Srinagar Kitty), hailing from a well-to-do family is a painter by passion. He falls in love with his friend's sister Namana (Sonu) much to the disapproval of his friend. The lovers part ways after some high level drama. Rajeev, dejected in life, hits the bar and begins to drink alcohol. He gradually goes to the highest level of addiction and spends his entire days drinking and getting abused by other people.

Unable to bare his plight, his brother forcefully gets him married off to Parimala (Bhavana). Despite this, he does not mend his ways and steals money at his own house to consume his drink. Eventually, he loses his wife to an accident and is left with his only daughter who shows a very promising talent in music. A series of tragic events occur and a musical professor (SPB) makes him realize his mistake of ignoring his daughter and her musical talent. The film ends with Rajeev happily spending time with his daughter and promoting her musical skills.

== Cast ==
- Srinagar Kitty (credited as Krishna) as Rajeev
- Bhavana as Parimala
- Sonu Gowda as Namana
- Rangayana Raghu as "Naayi" Seenappa
- Kishore as Prakash
- Pawan Kumar as Vasane Babu
- Balu Nagendra
- Jayashree Raj as Kalyani
- M. N. Lakshmi Devi as Jayamma
- Dinesh Mangaluru
- Arun Sagar as Cheluvayya
- Vikas (credited as Ravikiran) as Shankar
- Preethi Chandrashekar as Padma
- Chandrashekar as Muruga
- Prathiksha as Prarthana
- Priyanka as Chukki
- S. P. Balasubrahmanyam in a cameo appearance

== Production ==
Pawan Kumar who later turned director, was also cast to play the antagonist role.

== Soundtrack ==
Inthi Ninna Preethiya

Soundtrack album by Sadhu Kokila
- Released: 17 February 2008
- Recorded: 2007
- Genre: Feature film soundtrack
- Label: Ashwini Media

Sadhu Kokila scored the film's background music and composed its soundtrack, lyrics for which was penned by Jayanth Kaikini, Yogaraj Bhat and Ranganath. The soundtrack album consists of eight tracks.

Tracklist
No.	Title	Lyrics	Singer(s)	Length
1.	"Ondonde Bachhitta Maathu"	Yogaraj Bhat	Rajesh Krishnan, Sriraksha Priyaram
2.	"Mugiyada Kavithe Neenu"	Yogaraj Bhat	Hemanth Kumar
3.	"Yaaro Yaaro Yaaro"	Ranganath, Yogaraj Bhat	Mohammed Aslam
4.	"Hoo Kanasa Jokaali"	Yogaraj Bhat	Hemanth Kumar, Nanditha
5.	"Madhuvana Karedare (classical)"	Jayanth Kaikini	Chinmayi Sripada
6.	"Endu Endu Mugisada"	Yogaraj Bhat	Rajesh Krishnan
7.	"Inthi Ninna Preethiya (bit)"	Yogaraj Bhat	Sadhu Kokila
8.	"Madhuvana Karedare"	Jayanth Kaikini	Vani Harikrishna

== Reception ==
=== Critical response ===
R G Vijayasarathy of Rediff.com scored the film at 2.5 out of 5 stars and wrote "Chatterbox Rangayana Raghu is different in this film. He and Kishor are brilliant in their respective roles. In the play of words between the hero and the heroine, writer Suri shines but on the whole, there is fewer sparks in the dialogues penned by him. Inthi Ninna Preethiya would have been a better film if not for the repetitive sequences". A critic from Sify.com wrote "Satya Hegde is sure to be in the competition for an award for his camera work. The dark and medium lighting he has used the capturing of some of the locations are like paintings on the screen".
