= Apoorva Bharadwaj =

Indian actress

- Born: Bengaluru, Karnataka, India
- Education: Mass communication Manipal University, Manipal
- Occupation: Actress

Apoorva Bharadwaj is an Indian actress who primarily works in Kannada cinema and television. She made her acting debut in the television serial Anuroopa.

== Early life ==
Apoorva Bharadwaj was born in Bengaluru, Karnataka. She attended Bishop Cotton Women's Christian College in Bengaluru, where she studied journalism, before earning a masters in mass communication from Manipal University, Manipal.

== Career ==
Bharadwaj began her career as a television anchor, working with Kannada television channels including Zee Kannada, Colors Kannada, Kasthuri TV, and DD Chandana. She made her acting debut in the Star Suvarna television serial Anuroopa. She subsequently appeared in Kannada cinema. In 2024, she made her directorial debut with the anthology segment Sumoha, in the film BTS (Behind the scenes).

== Filmography ==
=== Film ===
Year	Title	Role	Language	Notes	Ref
2017	Uppina Kagada	Koose	Kannada		
2022	Critical Keerthanegalu	Chaitra	Kannada		
2022	Nodi Swami Ivanu Irodu Heege	Vinutha	Kannada		
2025	Nimma Vasthugalige Neeve Javaabdaararu	Rathna	Kannada		
2025	Nodidavaru Enanthare	Nadia / Sarah	Kannada		
2025	Bad	Anu	Kannada		

=== Television ===
Year	Title	Role	Network	Language	Ref
2015	Anuroopa	Sunaina	Star Suvarna	Kannada	
2016	Majaa Talkies	Sakre Uma	Colors Kannada	Kannada	
2017	Satyam Sivam Sundaram	Ishta	Star Suvarna	Kannada	
2022	Honeymoon	Daisy	Voot	Kannada	
2024	Gange Gowri	Akhila	Udaya TV	Kannada	
2025	Devi Mahatme	Yuvarani Vajreshwari	Star Suvarna	Kannada	
