= Nano Narayanappa =

Indian romantic comedy film

- Theatrical release poster
- Directed by: Kumaar
- Written by: Kumaar
- Produced by: Kumaar
- Starring: Krishnaji Rao
- Cinematography: Shivashankar
- Edited by: Deepu; Siddarth Nayaka
- Music by: Akash Parva
- Production company: Kesari Films Capture
- Release date: 7 July 2023
- Country: India
- Language: Kannada

Nano Narayanappa is a 2023 Indian Kannada-language romantic comedy film directed by Kumaar L and starring KGF-fame Krishnaji Rao in the titular role and final film to date. The film was released to mixed-to-positive reviews.

== Cast ==
- Krishnaji Rao as Nano Narayanappa
- Cockroach Sudhi
- Prashanth Siddi as Charlie
- Aksatha Kukki
- Apoorva
- Santu
- Ananthu Padmanabha as Rajesh
- King Mohan
- Pavithra
- Vijeth

== Music ==
The music was composed by Akash Parva.

Track listing
No.	Title	Lyrics	Singer(s)	Length
1.	"Money Hunter"	Kumaar	Ankitha Kundu	2:16
2.	"Jeevanada Jathreyalli"	Siddhu Kodipura	Keerthan Holla	3:39
Total length:				5:55

== Reception ==
A critic from The Times of India rated the film three out of five stars and wrote that "Despite shortcomings and unwanted scenes, this move is enjoyable". A critic from The New Indian Express wrote that "In an attempt to keep it natural, the film falls short in its execution and lacks a consistent emotional connection". A critic from Bangalore Mirror wrote that "It is worth a watch as it covers the range of human emotions such as greed and lust to true love."
