= Kaanadante Maayavadanu =

2020 Kannada Fantasy Film

- Theatrical release poster
- Directed by: Raj Pathipati
- Written by: Vikas; Raj Pathipati
- Produced by: Chandrashekar Naidu; Som Singh; Pushpa Somsingh
- Starring: Vikas; Sindhu Lokanath
- Cinematography: Sugnaan
- Edited by: Suresh Armugam
- Music by: Gummineni Vijay Babu
- Production company: Back Benchers Motion Picture
- Distributed by: Jayanna Films
- Release date: 31 January 2020
- Country: India
- Language: Kannada

Kaanadante Maayavadanu (transl. He vanished without being noticed) is a 2020 romantic fantasy Kannada film directed by debutante Raj Pathipati and produced by Back Benchers Motion Picture. The film gets its title from the opening lines of the song of the same name from the movie Chalisuva Modagalu. The film stars Vikas and Sindhu Lokanath.

== Cast ==
- Vikas as Rummy
- Sindhu Loknath as Vandana
- Achyuth Kumar as Chiranjeevi
- Suchendra Prasad as Mayambara Guruji
- Raghava Uday
- Bhajarangi Loki as Jayanna
- Dharmanna Kadur as Dharma
- Vinaya Prakash as Nirupama
- Nagaraj Arasu as Arasu

== Production ==
The film is produced by Back Benchers Motion Picture. The director is Raj pathipati while Vikas plays the hero. The film stalled when Raghava Uday the antagonist in the film died. He drowned along with another actor Anil performing a stunt for the film Maasthi Gudi. With modifications to the script the director chose actor Bhajarangi Loki to play Jayanna in the later half of the film.

== Soundtrack ==
Kaledhoda Kaalidaasa, the first single of the film was released on 24 September. Powerstar Puneeth Rajkumar has lent his voice for this peppy number. The lyrics are penned by V. Nagendra Prasad. Gummineni Vijay debuts as a music director with this album which was released on Anand Audio.

No.	Title	Singer(s)	Length
1.	"Kaledhodha kaalidasa"	Puneeth Rajkumar	3:26
2.	"Yeshtu chanda iwalu"	Santhosh Venky Apoorva Shridhar	4:11
3.	"Kone iradanta preetige"	Vijay Prakash	3:28
4.	"Minchina Balli"	Ashwin Sharma, Sangeetha Ravindranath	3:53

== Release ==
The trailer released on 3 July 2019. According to Bangalore Mirror the trailer has kicked up a storm and the popularity of the dog in the film is ensuring demand for Hindi dubbing rights.
