= Chandrika (Kannada actress) =

Indian actress and producer

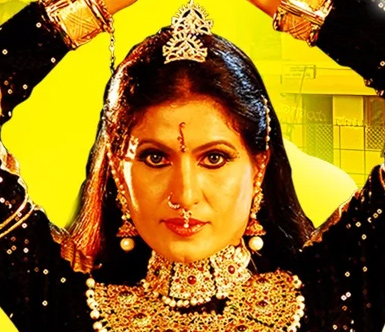
- Chandrika in 2011 film Sri Naga Shakthi
- Born: Chandrika; Arsikere, India
- Occupations: Film actress; producer
- Children: 1 son

Chandrika is an Indian actress and producer of Kannada cinema. Her best known films are Thayigobba Tharle Maga (1989) with Kashinath, Golmaal Radhakrishna (1990) with Anant Nag and Neenu Nakkare Haalu Sakkare (1991) with Vishnuvardhan. She has played the lead antagonist in the critically acclaimed Kendasampige (2015).

== Career ==
Chandrika has starred in more than thirty Kannada films and also participated in the reality show Bigg Boss Kannada, Season 1.

== Filmography ==
All films are in Kannada, unless otherwise noted.

Year	Film	Role	Notes	Ref.
1985	Masanada Hoovu	Saroja		
1986	Agni Pareekshe			
1986	Namma Oora Devathe			
1989	Thayigobba Tharle Maga			
1989	Narasimha	Roopa		
1990	Thrinethra			
1990	Swarna Samsara	Sujatha		
1990	Ranabheri			
1990	Golmaal Radhakrishna	Radha		
1990	Bhale Chatura	Kamala		
1991	Neenu Nakkare Haalu Sakkare	Urvashi		
1991	Keralida Kesari			
1991	Golmaal Part 2	Radha		
1991	Gandanige Thakka Hendthi			
1991	CBI Vijay			
1991	Hosa Raaga			
1992	Amara Prema			
1993	Vikram			
1993	Wanted		Also producer	
1993	Jana Mecchida Maga			
1993	Dakshayini			
1993	Bhagavan Sri Saibaba			
1994	Prema Simhasana			
1995	Mr. Vasu			
2005	Hai Chinnu			
2007	Appacchi			
2011	Sri Naga Shakthi		Also producer	
2013	Attahasa			
2014	Chathurbhuja			
2015	Kendasampige	Shakuntala Shetty		

== See also ==
- List of people from Karnataka
- Cinema of Karnataka
- List of Indian film actresses
- Cinema of India
