= Udaala =

Indian Kannada-language film

- Theatrical release poster
- Directed by: Amol Patil
- Written by: Amol Patil
- Dialogues by: Yogaraj Bhat
- Starring: Prithvi Shamanur; Hrithika Srinivas; Bala Rajwadi; Malu Nipnal; Harish Hiriyur
- Cinematography: Shivshankar Noorambada
- Edited by: Madhu Thumbakere
- Music by: Chetan–Davy
- Production companies: Yogaraj Cinemas; Ravi Shamanur Films
- Release date: 14 November 2025
- Country: India
- Language: Kannada

Udaala is a 2025 Indian Kannada-language film directed by Amol Patil. The film is produced by Yogaraj Cinemas and Ravi Shamanur Films. Set in North Karnataka, Udaala brings together romance, comedy and drama in a way that reflects the region's everyday culture.

== Plot ==
The story takes place in and around Bijapur in Karnataka. It follows an orphaned auto rickshaw driver who joins a local college after falling in love. What starts as a simple romantic pursuit slowly becomes a journey through campus conflicts, personal challenges and the search for dignity. The film shows his efforts to find a place where he feels accepted.

== Cast ==
- Prithvi Shamanur as Prakash Raj "Pakkya"
- Hrithika Srinivas as Pinky Patil
- Bala Rajwadi as Marthand Saathe
- Harish Hiriyur as Basant Saathe "Beedi Basya"
- Sumit Sankoji as Balolli
- Vadiraj Babladi as Paapya
- Malu Nipnal as Malu
- Praveen Gasti as Pavya
- Govinde Gowda as Police Constable
- Dayanand Beeligi as Daya
- Vaijanth Viradar as Shindi Master, College Principal
- Renu Gopi as Baby Babladi, final year medical student
- Yogaraj Bhat as cameo appearance

== Production ==
- Udaala* is the first independent directorial work of Amol Patil. The film uses the dialects, music and visual style of North Karnataka to reflect the rhythm of daily life in the region. Promotional material and interviews suggest that the team wanted the story to feel close to small town reality.

== Music ==
The soundtrack is composed by the duo Chetan–Davy. The songs are aligned with the film's regional tone and are placed at moments that connect with the emotional arc of the story.

== Release ==
The film was released on 14 November 2025. Teasers and trailers were circulated widely across social media and local entertainment outlets. The film found a strong early audience in districts of North Karnataka where the setting and language feel familiar.

== Reception ==
Early reviews described *Udaala* as a film rooted in its regional identity. Critics noted the performances and the strong sense of place, though some pointed out that the second half moves at a slower pace. Viewers in North Karnataka responded particularly well to the story and the local flavour.

== Themes ==
The film touches on themes of Social mobility, self respect, community identity and ambition. Through the protagonist's decision to return to education, the story reflects the everyday challenges experienced by people from modest backgrounds in small town India.
