= Popcorn Monkey Tiger =

2020 Kannada film directed by Duniya Soori

- Theatrical release poster
- Directed by: Duniya Soori
- Written by: Duniya Soori; Amritha K Bhargav
- Story by: Duniya Soori; Surendranath
- Produced by: Sudhir K. M.
- Starring: Dhananjay; Nivedhitha; Sapthami Gowda; Amrutha Iyengar
- Cinematography: Shekar S.
- Edited by: Deepu S. Kumar
- Music by: Charan Raj
- Production company: Studio 18
- Distributed by: Pushkar Films; Mohan Films
- Release date: 22 February 2020
- Running time: 133 minutes
- Country: India
- Language: Kannada
- Box office: ₹6.03 crore

Popcorn Monkey Tiger is a 2020 Indian Kannada-language action crime film directed by Duniya Soori and produced by K. M. Sudhir. It serves as a sequel to the 2015 film Kendasampige. The film features Dhananjaya, Amrutha Iyengar, Nivedhitha, Sapthami Gowda, Sparsha Rekha, and Prashanth Siddi. The soundtrack and background score were composed by Charan Raj while the cinematography and editing were handled by Shekhar S. and Deepu. S. Kumar.

A sequel titled Kaage Bangara and the third film in the trilogy was supposed to enter production in 2020.

Popcorn Monkey Tiger was released on 22 February 2020 to positive reviews from critics, but underperformed at the box office.

== Plot ==
The plot unfolds in a reverse-chronological fashion. It focuses on the life of the protagonist, Seena, and the evolution of his character due to external forces that sway him in different directions. Women/lovers involved in Seena's life contribute to these forces that trigger the Metamorphosis of his character. He goes from being a garage mechanic to a prominent leader in the underworld mafia.

"Popcorn" Devi, one of the lovers, has a profound impact on Seena's life. The back story on how "Popcorn" Devi got involved with the underworld unfolds parallelly alongside Seena's story.

== Cast ==
- Dhananjay as Tiger Seena aka "Monkey" Seena
- Nivedhitha as Devika aka "Popcorn" Devi
- Sparsha Rekha as Padma
- Amrutha Iyengar as Sumithra
- Sapthami Gowda as Girija
- Prabhu Srinivas as Razor Gopi
- Sinchana Gowda as Sinchu
- Monisha Nadgir as Sujaata
- Poornachandra Mysore as Bablu
- Prashanth Siddi as Haav Rani
- Goutam as Rakesh aka "Mooga"
- Nanda Kishore as Khalai
- Sudhi as Kothmeri
- Niranjan as Bhadravathi Kushka
- Nikhil as Micheal

== Soundtrack ==
Popcorn Monkey Tiger

Soundtrack album by Charan Raj
- Released: 2020
- Recorded: 2019
- Genre: Feature film soundtrack
- Label: PRK Audio

Charan Raj chronology
Avane Srimannarayana (2019)	Popcorn Monkey Tiger (2020)	Salaga (2020)
External audio
- Official Audio Jukebox on YouTube

Charan Raj scored the background music and soundtrack for the film. The audio rights were bought by PRK Audio in December 2019.

Track list
No.	Title	Lyrics	Singer(s)	Length
1.	"Maadeva"	Rithwik Kaikini, Hanumankind	Sanjith Hegde, Hanumankind	3:37
2.	"Psychedelic Maaye"	Nagarjuna Sharma (Rap: Rahul Dit-O)	Sanjith Hegde, Rahul Dit-o	3:07
Total length:				6.14

== Reception ==
Popcorn Monkey Tiger received positive reviews from critics.

=== Critical response ===
Sunayna Suresh of The Times of India gave 3.5/5 and wrote "While fans of crime and gore will enjoy this, Popcorn Monkey Tiger is a film that unintentionally glorifies the underworld in more ways than one." A. Sharadhaa of The New Indian Express gave 3.5/5 stars and wrote "Popcorn Monkey Tiger is original and has Suri's signature all over it. This is a film for all the lovers of the director's work, as well as for the fans of Dhananjay, and for those who adore the mafia-based films."

Y. Maheshwara Reddy of Bangalore Mirror gave 2.5/5 stars and wrote "It is worth watching if you want to see Dhananjaya in a different avatar and also ready to cope with sound pollution caused by indecent dialogues." Aravind Shwetha of The News Minute praised the film's reverse chronological screenwriting and wrote "Popcorn Monkey Tiger is raw, rugged and realistic, and a must-watch for mass movie lovers."
