= Critical Keerthanegalu =

2022 Indian Kannada-language film

- Directed by: Kumaar
- Produced by: Kumar L
- Starring: Tabla Nani; Suchendra Prasad; Taranga Vishwa; Rajesh Nataranga; Apoorva Bharadwaj; Aruna Balraj
- Cinematography: Shiva Seena; Shiva Shankar
- Edited by: Vishwa Vijeth
- Music by: Veer Samarth
- Production company: Kesari Films Capture
- Release date: 13 May 2022
- Running time: 129 min
- Country: India
- Language: Kannada

Critical Keertanegalu is a 2022 Indian Kannada-language comedy drama film directed by Kumaar. It stars Tabla Nani, Suchendra Prasad, Rajesh Nataranga, Taranga Vishwa, Apoorva, Aruna Balraj are in the lead roles. The Music composed by Veer Samarth . Cinematography done by Shiva Seena & Shiva Shankar and it is edited by Vishwa Vijeth. The film is produced by Kumar L under Kesari Films Capture banners.

== Cast ==
- Tabla Nani
- Suchendra Prasad
- Rajesh Nataranga
- Taranga Vishwa
- Apoorva Bharadwaj
- Aruna Balraj
