= Nodidavaru Enanthare =

2025 Indian drama film

- Theatrical release poster
- Directed by: Kuldeep Cariappa
- Written by: Kuldeep Cariappa
- Produced by: Nagesh Gopal
- Starring: Naveen Shankar; Apoorva Bharadwaj
- Cinematography: Ashwin Kennedy
- Edited by: Manu Shedgar
- Music by: Mayuresh Adhikari
- Production companies: Hippo and Kiddo Motion Pictures
- Distributed by: Janani Pictures
- Release date: 31 January 2025
- Running time: 136 minutes
- Country: India
- Language: Kannada

Nodidavaru Enanthare (transl. What will people say?) is a 2025 Indian Kannada-language drama film written and directed by Kuldeep Cariappa. The film stars Naveen Shankar and Apoorva Bharadwaj, alongside Padmavati Rao, Ayra Krishna, and Rajesh in supporting roles.

== Plot ==
The narrative follows Siddharth Devaih (played by Naveen Shankar), a talented web designer from Kodagu who faces an existential crisis after a series of personal and professional setbacks. His life spirals downward following a painful breakup, a humiliating altercation at work, and the sudden death of his father. These events trigger deep-seated abandonment issues stemming from his mother leaving him during childhood. In search of meaning and escape, Siddharth embarks on an unplanned road trip across Karnataka. His journey introduces him to Mallanna (Rajesh), a carefree shepherd who rekindles his sense of innocence, and Sarah (Apoorva Bharadwaj), a free-spirited traveler who challenges his cynicism and helps him rediscover hope. Through these encounters, Siddharth begins to confront his emotional wounds and reevaluate his outlook on life.

The film's emotional core revolves around Siddharth's strained relationship with his estranged mother (Padmavati Rao), now a celebrated author. Their eventual reunion underscores themes of forgiveness and acceptance. The story emphasizes that happiness and healing come through connection rather than isolation, echoing the idea that life's meaning is found in relationships, not escape. The climax portrays Siddharth's transformation from a bitter, lost soul to someone embracing life's unpredictability.

== Cast ==
- Naveen Shankar as Siddharth Devaih aka Siddhu
- Apoorva Bharadwaj as Sarah
- Padmavati Rao as Kranti Devi
- Ayra Krishna as Ashika
- Rajesh as Mallana,
- Sonu Gowda as Ex-lover, special appearance
- Spandana Prasad as Aunt
- Dharmendra Aras as Uncle

== Production ==
To prepare for the role, Naveen Shankar underwent a two-month diet to lose weight, which included a week-long liquid diet. As of 8 November 2020, it was reported that seventy percent of the film had been shot, but the remaining work was halted temporarily due to the COVID-19 pandemic. The title of the film, Nodidavaru Enanthare, was revealed by Sriimurali on 5 November 2020. The principal photography for the film took place in Karnataka and parts of Maharashtra.

== Soundtrack ==
Nodidavaru Enanthare

Soundtrack album by Mayuresh Adhikari
- Released: 2025
- Genre: Feature film soundtrack
- Length: 12:13
- Language: Kannada
- Label: Anand Audio

The soundtrack was composed by Mayuresh Adhikari.

Track listing
No.	Title	Lyrics	Singer(s)	Length
1.	"Theme"	—	—	0:58
2.	"Hejjeye Roopisu"	Jayanth Kaikini	Keerthan Holla	2:31
3.	"Malagiru Kanda"	Jayanth Kaikini	Sadhu Kokila	4:25
4.	"Alive"	Lyla	Robert Jordan Kirk	4:19
Total length:				12:13

== Release ==
Nodidavaru Enanthare was released theatrically on 31 January 2025 by Janani Pictures.

== Reception ==
A critic from The Times of India rated the film four out of five stars and wrote, "The movie is poetry in motion which tugs the heart’s strings at the right places. The slow pacing only adds to the intensity of the film." A critic from The New Indian Express gave it three-and-a-half out of five stars and wrote, "Director Kuldeep, with Nodidavaru Enanthare, threads a travel story that connects with anyone grappling with personal and professional turmoil. His narrative captures the essence of individuals like Siddharth, who are lost in their struggles, seeking escape and meaning in a world that feels overwhelming."

Shashiprasad SM of Times Now gave it three-and-a-half out of five stars and wrote, "The journey is filled with experiences that Kuldeep Cariappa effectively brings to life through his writing. While the storytelling, on-screen narration, and decent presentation are noteworthy, it is Naveen Shankar’s portrayal of an existentialist that gives the film a realistic touch." Y. Maheswara Reddy of Bangalore Mirror gave it three out of five stars and noted that "The director has made an attempt to convey a message to youth who get in and out of relationships. Another message is to parents on the need to give their children some space while selecting a profession or life partner."

Sunayana Suresh of The South First gave it three out of five stars and wrote, "Nodidavaru Enantare is a film that is well worth an outing if your dose of cinema includes stories that play out at their own pace with enough time for you to observe little nuances and details." Swaroop Kodur of The News Minute opined that "Nodidavaru Enanthare is an ambitious attempt in its own right, particularly for a film tackling the subjects of identity and existentialism. It has a supremely committed Naveen Shankar (and a talented ensemble cast) leading the way and a competent technical crew in support, but what's missing is a bit of inventiveness."

Vivek M. V. of The Hindu wrote, "Nodidavaru Enantare is a refreshing film, even if it dabbles with the often-tried coming-of-age genre. The film is a poignant snapshot of a youngster striving to find himself while struggling to move on from his bitter past." Pranati A. S. of Deccan Herald gave it two out of five stars and opined that "Kuldeep weaves an interesting plot introducing characters who try to add meaning to Siddharth’s life. It is clear he has mommy issues — his mother left him as a baby. But the audience has to bear with his woman-bashing attitude for the entire movie, to only be met with a lukewarm five-minute resolution towards the end."
