= Kirik Party (soundtrack) =

Soundtrack album by B. Ajaneesh Loknath
- Released: 26 November 2016
- Recorded: 2016
- Genre: Feature film soundtrack
- Length: 22:14
- Language: Kannada
- Label: Paramvah Music; Divo
- Producer: B. Ajaneesh Loknath

B. Ajaneesh Loknath chronology
Mummy: Save Me (2016)	Kirik Party (2016)	Sipaayi (2016)

Kirik Party is the soundtrack album composed by B. Ajaneesh Loknath, for the 2016 Kannada film of the same name. The film has ten tracks, out of which only six were included in the soundtrack album which initially released on 26 November 2016. The makers later released the remaining tracks as an extended album on 24 December 2016. The soundtrack had lyrics written by Rakshit Shetty, Dhananjay Ranjan, Kiran Kaverappa and Veeresh Shivamurthy. Deciding to not tie up with any music label, the producers released the album online under their own banner Paramvah Music, a subsidiary of Paramvah Studios and the digital partner Divo. The tracks received viral response from audiences.

== Reception ==
On 4 November 2016, the video for the track "Belageddu", sung by Vijay Prakash, was released, and became chartbuster song for almost one year and also until date. "Belageddu" went on to become the most viewed Kannada song, achieving more than 94 million views on YouTube, until its record was beaten by "Karabuu" (from Pogaru). It crossed 100 million views in December 2020, thus becoming the second Kannada song to get 100 million views.

== Track listing ==
No.	Title	Lyrics	Artist(s)	Length
1.	"Katheyonda Helide"	Rakshit Shetty	Varun Ramachandra	3:53
2.	"Thirboki Jeevana"	Rakshit Shetty	B. Ajaneesh Loknath	3:15
3.	"Hey Who Are You"	Dhananjay Ranjan	Indu Nagaraj, Bharath B. J.	4:54
4.	"Neenire Saniha"	Kiran Kaverappa	Shreya Ghoshal	3:38
5.	"Last Benchina Party"	Veeresh Shivamurthy	Chintan Vikas, Varun Ramachandra, Chandan Achar, B. Ajaneesh Loknath	2:57
6.	"Belageddu"	Dhananjay Ranjan	Vijay Prakash, Shruthi Prashanth	3:37
Total length:				22:14

== Extended soundtrack ==
Though the movie had a few additional tracks, they were not released as a part of the official soundtrack initially. Post the release of the movie, many fans requested the team to release other songs as well.

No.	Title	Lyrics	Artist(s)	Length
1.	"Thoogu Manchadalli Koothu"	H. S. Venkateshamurthy	Sangeetha Ravindranath	2:19
2.	"Neecha Sullu Sutto Naalige"	Dhananjay Ranjan	Vasishta N. Simha	3:31
3.	"Kaagadada Doniyalli"	Jayanth Kaikini	Vasuki Vaibhav	5:08
4.	"Katheyoda Helide (Farewell Version)"	Rakshit Shetty	B. Ajaneesh Loknath	5:26
Total length:				13:07

== Controversy ==
The track "Hey Who Are You", which had the music allegedly similar to the track, "Madhyarathrili" of the 1991 Kannada film Shanti Kranti, had to be deleted from the film, after Lahari Music had the release of the film stayed after it approached the court accusing the makers of violation of copyrights that it held. Eventually court gave permissions to feature the song in the movie as it was stated to be inspired but not allegedly made to be similar. The matter has been amicably resolved after the producer Vijay Kirgandur got the trio Lahari Velu, director of Lahari Music, Rakshith Shetty and Ajaneesh Lokanath to share their perspectives.
