= Rajesh Nataranga =

Kannada actor and writer

- Born: Rajesh; 18 April 1973 (age 53); Bombay, Maharashtra, India
- Occupation: Actor
- Spouse: Chaitra (m. 2005)
- Children: 1

Rajesh Nataranga (18 April 1973) is an Indian actor who works in Kannada-language television and films. He is known for his roles as a police officer in films, Kendasampige (2015) and Operation Alamelamma (2017), and as Gowtham Diwan in the television soap, Amruthadhare. He is married to Chaitra Rajesh since 2005.

== Career ==
Rajesh appended Nataranga, the name of a theatre group he was a part of, to his stage name after B. Suresha told him to since there was another actor of the same name. He starred in many television serials during the late 1990s and early 2000s. Regarding his performance in Just Maath Maathalli (2010) as Ramya's husband, a critic wrote that "Rajesh, who plays the spirited Adi, does justice to his role". Regarding his performance in Kendasampige (2015) as a police officer, a critic wrote that "But it is Rajesh Nataranga who really steals the show with his impressive presence". He played a similar role in Operation Alamelamma (2017). He became known for his role as Gautam Diwan in the television series Amruthadhare, which marked his comeback to television.

== Filmography ==
Year	Title	Role	Notes
2001	Mathadana	Prakash Kumar	
2002	Nagarahavu		
2002	Tapori	Kasa	
2003	Mooru Manasu Mooru Kanasu	Surya	
2003	Ananda	Raja	
2003	Mane Magalu		
2003	Ananda Nilaya		
2004	Rowdy Aliya	Estate worker	
2004	Abbabba Entha Huduga		
2005	Sye	Arjun	
2006	Mohini 9886788888	Rajesh	
2007	Thamashegagi		
2007	Ondu Preethiya Kathe		
2008	Moggina Jade	Raghavendra	Karnataka State Film Award for Best Supporting Actor
2008	Moggina Manasu	Ramesh	
2008	Belura Bale		
2008	Gubbachigalu		
2009	Dubai Babu	Police Inspector	Credited as N. Rajesh
2009	Bellary Naga	Rajendra Gowda	
2009	Prem Kahani	Builder Rajesh	
2009	Kallara Santhe		
2010	Just Maath Maathalli	Adi	
2010	Aptharakshaka	Shoorasena	
2010	Naanu Nanna Kanasu	Uthappa's friend	
2011	Jedralli		
2011	Shrimathi		
2011	Maryade Ramanna	Doctor	
2012	Arakshaka		
2012	Sangolli Rayanna	Krishnaroo	
2013	Kaddipudi	Indresh/Gaali	Also co-writer
2013	Sakkare	Nandakumar	
2013	Dyavre	Jaggu	
2014	Gajakesari	Minister	
2014	Baanaadi (Free Bird)	Avinash	
2015	Lodde	—	Dialogue writer
2015	Kendasampige	Purandar	Also co-writer Nominated—SIIMA Award for Best Actor in a Supporting Role
2015	Plus	Kishore	
2016	Killing Veerappan	Shakeel Ahmed	
2016	Happy Birthday		
2016	Asthitva	Vijay Kumar	
2016	Jaguar		Bilingual film
2017	Style Raja		
2017	BB5		
2017	Noorondu Nenapu	MK	
2017	Tiger		
2017	Operation Alamelamma	Ashok Kumar	Nominated—SIIMA Award for Best Actor in a Supporting Role
2017	Kaafi Thota	Public Prosecutor	
2017	Tarak		
2017	Dayavittu Gamanisi	Sathyanarayana	
2018	Rajannana Maga	Vijay Kumar	
2018	Nanagista	Police officer	
2018	Kattu Kathe		
2019	Fortuner	Prahallada	
2019	Kaddu Mucchi		
2019	Rugged		
2019	Vijayaratha		
2019	Mane Maratakkide	Shravana	
2019	Ayushman Bhava		
2019	Margaret		
2020	Law	Shyam Prasad	
2021	Yuvarathnaa	Professor	
2021	Kotigobba 3	Doctor Ananthakrishna	
2021	Rathnan Prapancha	Srinath	
2021	Rider	Raghuram	
2022	Home Minister		
2022	Critical Keerthanegalu		
2022	Garuda	Bharath Bharghav	
2022	Physics Teacher	Ramaswamy	
2022	Chase		
2022	Raymo	Revanth's P.A.	
2023	Tanuja	Pradeep	
2023	SLV: Siri Lambodara Vivaha		
2023	19.20.21	Rafi	
2023	Gurudev Hoysala	Prakash	
2023	Nam Naani Madve Prasanga		
2023	Melody Drama	Hita's father	
2023	Fighter	Kotreshi	
2024	Ondu Sarala Prema Kathe	Athishay's father	
2024	Hide and Seek		
2024	Jog 101		
2024	Kaalapatthar		
2024	Megha	Chandrasekhar	
2025	Kothalavadi	SP Parashuram	
2025	Love U Muddu		
2025	Full Meals	Shankar	
2026	Theertharoopa Thandeyavarige	Vishwanath	
2026	Love Seasons		

=== Television ===
Year	Title	Role	Notes	Ref.
1998	Mayamruga	Shreedhara		
2003–2008	Guptagamini	Thejaswi		
2004–2006	Muktha	-		
2017–2018	Triveni Sangama			
2021	Ninnindale	—N/a	As producer	
2023–present	Amruthadhare	Goutham Diwan		
