= Doddmane Hudga =

- Theatrical release poster
- Directed by: Duniya Soori
- Written by: Duniya Soori
- Story by: Vikas; Duniya Soori
- Produced by: M. Govinda
- Starring: Puneeth Rajkumar; Radhika Pandit; Ambareesh; Sumalatha; Bharathi Vishnuvardhan; Krishna; Srinivasa Murthy; P. Ravi Shankar
- Narrated by: Shiva Rajkumar
- Cinematography: Satya Hegde
- Edited by: Deepu S. Kumar
- Music by: V. Harikrishna
- Production company: Ajay Pictures
- Release date: 30 September 2016
- Running time: 136 minutes
- Country: India
- Language: Kannada
- Box office: ₹45 crore

Doddmane Hudga is a 2016 Indian Kannada-language action drama film co-written and directed by Duniya Soori, featuring Puneeth Rajkumar and Radhika Pandit. The film also features an ensemble cast of Ambareesh, Sumalatha, Bharathi Vishnuvardhan, Krishna, Srinivasa Murthy, and P. Ravi Shankar, with Shiva Rajkumar providing a voice-over. This film marks the 25th film with Puneeth Rajkumar in a lead role.

The film also marks the third collaboration between Puneeth and Soori. The film was produced by M. Govindu under Ajay Pictures banner. Music was composed by V. Harikrishna and art direction by Shashidhar Adapa. The principal photography commenced on 5 March 2015. The film was released worldwide on 30 September 2016 to positive reviews and it was commercially successful.

== Plot ==
Surya is a short-tempered youngster, who cooks biriyani at a local market. He meets Usha when he saves her from goons and drops her off at a drama studio, where it is revealed that Usha is in fact Nisha, who is participating in a drama. 'Cable' Babu is a goon who wants to become a politician. When his goons were setting a shop on fire, they were all thrashed by Doddmane Rajeeva. When his son Krishna robs some jewellery, Rajeeva humiliates him. Krishna joins hands with Babu to humiliate Rajeeva. After that, Babu steals all the land documents that belong to the farmers leading to Rajeeva's arrest.

Surya's father, Mallanna suffers a stroke and gets admitted to the hospital. In need of money to save Mallanna, Surya takes up the job of assassinating Rajeeva, and goes to prison to kill him. However, Surya ends up fighting a prisoner who was about to kill Rajeeva and is also sent to prison, where it is revealed that Surya is Rajeeva's long-lost son. But Surya hates him and reveals to Nisha that his father did not care for him in his childhood. Surya reconciles with the rest of his family and returns home. After a cat-and-mouse game between Surya and Cable Babu, Krishna apologizes for his misdeeds and Cable Babu's brother Manja gets killed.

Rajeeva reveals that he didn't care for Surya during his childhood because he promised his sister that he would always care for Krishna. Cable Babu stabs Rajeeva and Surya thrashes Babu and throws him in a tunnel, where Babu's assistant kills Babu by burying him alive. Surya brings the farmers' documents and Rajeeva recovers, where he distributes the documents back to the farmers, who realize their mistake and apologize to Rajeeva. The families reconcile and happily celebrate their village festival.

== Cast ==
- Puneeth Rajkumar as Doddmane Surya, Rajeeva's son
- Ambareesh as Doddmane Rajeeva
- Radhika Pandit as Usha/Nisha, Surya's love interest
- Sumalatha as Doddmane Rajeeva's wife
- Bharathi Vishnuvardhan as Doddmane Rajeeva's sister and Doddmane Krishna's mother
- Krishna as Doddmane Krishna, Rajeeva's nephew
- Srinivasa Murthy as Mallanna Gowda, Surya's foster father
- P. Ravi Shankar as Cable Babu
- Rangayana Raghu as Nanjunda, Surya's uncle
- Chikkanna as Lawanga/Langa, Surya's friend
- Avinash as Lawyer Subramanya, Nisha's father
- Udaya Raghav as Karate Manja, Cable Babu's younger brother
- Prashanth Siddi as Surya's friend
- Dattanna
- Cockroach Sudhi
- Mico Nagaraj as Patela
- Stunt Siddu
- K. S. L. Swamy as Priest
- Sathyajith as Gowda
- Honnavalli Krishna
- Dharaneendrayya

== Production ==
=== Development ===
In February 2014, it was reported that Soori and Puneeth Rajkumar would work together again under Ajay Pictures. V. Harikrishna was selected to compose the music for this film. The song recording was launched at the Prasad Recording Studios in Bangalore on 24 April 2014. Art director Shashidhar Adapa was selected to handle art direction for the film. The film's cinematography was selected to Satya Hegde.

=== Casting ===
In July 2014, it was reported that Ramya would play the female lead of the movie but later she walked out of the movie citing "remuneration problems". After Ramya's exit Radhika Pandit was roped to play lead actress role which marked her second collaboration with Puneeth Rajkumar. Rebel star Ambareesh and Sumalatha were signed for portraying the parents role of Puneeth Rajkumar in the movie. Veteran actress Bharathi Vishnuvardhan was chosen to play the role of Ambareesh's sister in the movie. Srinivasa Murthy, Chikkanna, Rangayana Raghu, P. Ravi Shankar, Avinash, Udaya Raghav and Santosh Aryavardan of Bigboss 2 fame were chosen to play crucial role in the movie.

=== Filming ===
Principal photography began on 5 March 2015 at the temple of Ganesha in Sadashivanagar, Bangalore. Parvathamma Rajkumar, actors V. Ravichandran, Shiva Rajkumar, Raghavendra Rajkumar, Srinivasa Murthy, Bharathi Vishnuvardhan, Radhika Pandit, Vinay Rajkumar, Imran Sardhariya were among the film personalities present at the event.

== Soundtrack ==
Doddmane Hudga

Soundtrack album by V. Harikrishna
- Released: 26 August 2016
- Recorded: 2016
- Genre: Feature film soundtrack
- Length: 18:52
- Language: Kannada
- Label: D Beats Music World
- Producer: V. Harikrishna

V. Harikrishna chronology
Jaggu Dada (2016)	Doddmane Hudga (2016)	Santhu Straight Forward (2016)

Singles from Doddmane Hudga
- 1. "Abhimanigale" Released: 14 August 2016

V. Harikrishna was signed to compose the soundtrack album and background score for the film. The song recording of the movie commenced on 24 April 2014, the birth anniversary of actor Rajkumar at Prasad Studios in Bangalore. Lyrics for the soundtrack were written by Jayanth Kaykini, Yogaraj Bhat and V. Nagendra Prasad. The soundtrack album consists of five tracks. The first track "Abhimanigale" was released on 14 August by Shivakumara Swami.

=== Track listing ===
No.	Title	Lyrics	Singer(s)	Length
1.	"Abhimanigale"	Yogaraj Bhat	Shiva Rajkumar, Puneeth Rajkumar	4:10
2.	"Thraas Akkathi"	Yogaraj Bhat	V. Harikrishna, Indu Nagaraj	3:43
3.	"Kanasive Nooraru"	Jayanth Kaikini	Karthik, Swetha Mohan	3:53
4.	"C/o Doddmane"	Yogaraj Bhat	Tippu, Sangeetha Ravindranath	4:09
5.	"Naguva Nanjunda"	V. Nagendra Prasad	Chintan Vikas	2:57
Total length:				18:52

== Reception ==
Sunayana Suresh of The Times of India rated the film 3.5/5 stars and wrote, "The story is predictable and the twists too, but a commercial entertainer excels when it makes the mundane magical. This is where Suri's style, dialogues and characterizations work." Shyam Prasad S. of Bangalore Mirror gave it 3/5 stars and wrote, "While director Suri manages to serve a heavy meal. But he relies excessively on Puneeth's star power rather than a chunky story, especially in the second half. He continues to dilute the plot with one fight sequence after another." Shashiprasad S. M. of Deccan Chronicle wrote, "The first half of this biryani which tasted good soon turns out to be an indigestible meal with heavy masala and too many bones further spoils the fun. Howsoever, its a full meals for the big fans of rebel and power star."
