= Jackie (2010 film) =

- Theatrical release poster
- Directed by: Duniya Soori
- Written by: Duniya Soori
- Produced by: Parvathamma Rajkumar
- Starring: Puneeth Rajkumar; Sumithra; Bhavana; Harshika Poonacha; Rangayana Raghu
- Cinematography: Satya Hegde
- Edited by: Deepu S. Kumar
- Music by: V. Harikrishna
- Production company: Poornima Enterprises
- Release date: 14 October 2010
- Running time: 155 minutes
- Country: India
- Language: Kannada
- Box office: ₹40 Crore

Jackie is a 2010 Indian Kannada-language Masala film written and directed by Duniya Soori and produced by Parvathamma Rajkumar. The film stars Puneeth Rajkumar and Bhavana in the lead roles, while Sumithra, Harshika Poonacha, Rangayana Raghu, Petrol Prasanna, Vikas and Ravi Kale appear in supporting roles.

Jackie was released on 14 October 2010 to critical acclaim from critics. The film is noted for its technical prowess, witty dialogues and lyrics, combined with an art that has become a trademark of Soori's rustic feel cinema.

Jackie was also considered one of the trendsetting films of the Kannada cinema and one of the landmark movies in Puneeth Rajkumar's career. It was especially noted for its music by V. Harikrishna. Yograj Bhat was the lyricist for all the songs of the film. The album, which celebrated its platinum disc, is also available as a 5.1 audio DVD disc. After successful screening in Australia, United Kingdom and Germany, the film was released in US and Singapore in February 2011.

A portion of the song Kannalle Eno from Rajkumar's 1980 movie Vasantha Geetha was re-used in the title track of the film. The film was dubbed and released in Telugu on 6 May 2011. The film was adjudged the Best Film of 2010 at the South Filmfare Awards. The film was declared the highest grosser of the year.

The film was re- released grandly with upgraded technical features on 15 March 2024 to commemorate Puneeth's birth anniversary.

== Plot ==
Janakirama aka Jackie is a talkative school dropout who is living with his mother Jayamma and operates a flour mill in a village with his mother. Jackie dreams of making it big without hard work and is also an expert card player and thinks he can repay all his debts with earnings from it. Jackie does every job and hopes that he would make it big as a real estate dealer. In his locality, Jackie's friend Yashodha, who is a priest's daughter, reveals that she is in love with a photo studio owner Parangi Seena and asks Jackie to help her get married. Jackie initially tries to help, but when the priest questions him regarding his responsibilities of a brother, Jackie decides to cop out of the issue, respecting the aged father's feelings.

Losing all hope, Yashodha elopes with Seena, along with a blind girl Puttavva. Unknown to Yashoda, Seena is actually a conduit for a human trafficker named Mithai Rama. The priest is under the impression that Jackie is the mediator in this case. Jackie takes responsibility to trace Yashodha and bring her back. Meanwhile, Jackie is followed by a CID officer and his team as he has sheltered his friend Tulasi, who has escaped from prison. The CID officer tracks them down and kills Tulasi, but Jackie escapes from the police and reaches a dense forest.

Jackie also averts a ritual of human sacrifice where Lakshmi is the intended victim. The trouble shoots up for Jackie as even the CID officer and his team are after him. After landing in Bengaluru, Jackie finds that Puttavva, who went with Yashodha is dead. Jackie gets a clue about Prasanna alias Jooli after being friendly to constable "Meese" Bheemanna which leads him to suspicious activities of a gang transporting girls abroad in oil tankers headed by Mithai. When the CID officer catches him, Jackie explains the situation by tracking them with the help of Lakshmi. Not trusting the CID officers, Jackie escapes and saves Mithai, and they reach the hideout.

Having guessed that Jackie is with the cops, Mithai confronts him where he divulges the truth and is taken to see Yashoda. A fight erupts where Jackie is knocked out and is partially buried with Yashoda. Mithai and Seena leave with the girls in oil tankers. However, Jackie awakes from the site along with Yashoda, he tracks down Mithai and Seena and thrashes them. The girls are saved and the CID officer realizes the situation; he congratulates Jackie for solving the case and kills Seena and Rama in an encounter. Jackie tells Yashoda to call her father and Lakshmi, who has fallen for Jackie, proposes to him in a comical fashion by holding him at point-blank. Jackie takes his mother to see Yashoda and also introduces Lakshmi.

== Cast ==
- Puneeth Rajkumar as Janakirama "Jackie"
- Sumithra as Jayamma, Jackie's mother
- Bhavana as Lakshmi, Jackie's love interest
- Harshika Poonacha as Yashodha
- Vikas as Parangi Seena
- Rangayana Raghu as "Meese" Bheemanna, Constable
- Bullet Prakash as Malgere Sanna, social worker
- M. S. Umesh as Newspaper Shop owner
- Mithra as shopkeeper
- Raju Thalikote as a matrimonial agent
- Sampath Raj as CID officer
- Shobharaj as SP
- Ravi Kale as Mithai Rama
- Vaijanath Biradar as Kemmraja
- Petrol Prasanna as Prasanna "Jooli"
- Honnavalli Krishna as a chicken seller
- Siddaramu as Siddarama

=== Cameo appearance ===
- Duniya Soori in the song "Jackie Jackie"
- Yogaraj Bhat in the song "Jackie Jackie"
- V. Harikrishna in the song "Jackie Jackie"
- Krishna as CID officer (uncredited)

== Production ==
The production of the film started on 3 March at Kantheerava Studio and took place for 95 days in Bengaluru, Mysore, Italy and Namibia. The film is made in the home production of Rajkumar's family under the banner of Poornima Enterprises. Jackie is Puneet's 15th film and his first with Duniya Soori. The film marks the debut of Malayalam actress Bhavana in Kannada language films.

Duniya Soori, who is known for maintaining his script and characters as a secret, had earlier revealed that the film is about how life takes a turn for Jackie and the way he faces the challenges and added that the film would be different from Puneet's earlier films. Soori was initially "scared" to be directing a Puneeth Rajkumar flick just because of the enormous expectations from the audience. SnorriCam has been used extensively in the film's song and stunt sequences, giving it a point-of-view feel. The director-actor went on to collaborate with films like Anna Bond and Doddmane Hudga.

The remake rights were purchased by NS Rajkumar, who dubbed the film into Telugu and Malayalam languages for a 2011 release.

== Soundtrack ==
=== Kannada soundtrack ===
Jackie

Soundtrack album by V. Harikrishna
- Released: 11 August 2010
- Genre: Feature film soundtrack
- Label: Anand Audio
External audio
- Official Audio Jukebox on YouTube

Jackie Kannada soundtrack was released in the month of August 2010. In a first of its kind, audio was simultaneously released over Bluetooth by a Bengaluru-based company called TELiBrahma. TELiBrahma developed an exclusive mobile application for the film and distributed it across about 100 of its proprietary technology called BluFi locations in Bengaluru. Considered a success, this campaign resulted in nearly 55,000 downloads in 16 days.

Overall, the commercial reception of the album was successful, with 20,000 audio CDs being sold on the first day. The music album was released again on a 5.1 Audio DVD during platinum disc celebration on 27 December 2010.

The music was composed by V. Harikrishna and lyrics were penned by Yogaraj Bhat.

A portion of the song Kannalle Eno from Rajkumar's 1980 movie Vasantha Geetha was re-used in the title track of this movie.

All lyrics are written by Yogaraj Bhat.

No.	Title	Singer(s)	Length
1.	"Shiva Antha Hogutidde"	Tippu	4:07
2.	"Eradu Jadeyannu"	Sonu Nigam, Shreya Ghoshal	4:46
3.	"Ekka Raja Rani"	Kailash Kher	4:13
4.	"Edavatt Aytu"	Puneeth Rajkumar, Priya Himesh	3:57
5.	"Jackie Jackie"	Naveen Madhav	4:04

Leaked Song
The soundtrack of the film created quite a stir before the audio release when the song "Ekka Raja Rani" was leaked on YouTube. This song, though unfinished, became quite popular with listeners.

Track #	Song	Singer	Lyricist
1	Ekka Raja Rani	Tippu	Yogaraj Bhat

=== Telugu soundtrack ===
Jackie

Soundtrack album by V. Harikrishna
- Released: February 2011
- Genre: Feature film soundtrack
- Label: Aditya Music
External audio
- Official Audio Jukebox on YouTube

Telugu version audio release was held on 26 February 2011 at Hotel Daspalla in Hyderabad with Telugu film personalities Akkineni Nageswara Rao and Allu Arjun as chief guests. Bhuvana Chandra, Vennelakanti and Vanamali have composed the Telugu lyrics.

Telugu tracklist
No.	Title	Lyrics	Singer(s)	Length
1.	"Sivaletti Pothunnanu"	Bhuvana Chandra	Tippu
2.	"Jadalo Virajajey"	Vennelakanti	Rakhi, Harini
3.	"Aasu Raju Rani"	Vennelakanti	Murali
4.	"Kissu Missu"	Vennelakanti	Tippu, Veena Ghantasala
5.	"Poleramma Jatarlona"	Vanamali	Tippu

== Release ==
=== Kannada ===
Jackie received an opening unprecedented in Kannada cinema after it was purchased by distributors at astronomical prices many days before the film's release. Jackie was released all over Karnataka apart from 4 in Tamil Nadu and a 3 multiplex in Hyderabad. The film, which was initially slated for a 23 September 2010, was later postponed to 14 October 2010 owing to pending work on digital grading.

==== International releases ====
Jackie was released overseas by Bevin Exports in the countries of Australia, UK, Singapore, Germany, US, Dubai and New Zealand among others. The same firm had earlier released other Kannada blockbusters like Mungaaru Male and Aramane worldwide. The global distribution will be on a 50:50 sharing between Poornima Enterprises and Bevin Exports. It was screened in Melbourne, Adelaide and Perth on 7 November, where it was well received by the audience, which also consisted of non-Kannadigas. A similar reception was reported in Germany, where the screening took place in mid-December. In the UK, it was screened in the months of November and December in association with Gandhadagudi Movies Team. The film was part of the Indian Melbourne Film Festival on 29 Dec. In United States, Jackie was released in a phase-wise manner from the 2nd week of Jan 2011. In its first phase, screening was held in San Francisco and Bay Area. In the next phase, the film was screened in Los Angeles, New Jersey, Dallas and Houston. In Singapore, the film was screened on 6 March 2011.

=== Telugu ===
The Telugu dubbed version was produced by Nadella Sujatha through Suraj Films Studio and was released in Andhra Pradesh on 6 May 2011.

=== Re-Release ===
The movie re-released on 15 March 2024 in 175 centres and earned ₹1crore on the first day.

== Reception ==
=== Critical response ===
The Times of India wrote "An action-packed thriller with Puneet Rajkumar at his best." The New Indian Express wrote "'Jackie' is an enjoyable fast paced entertainer. The audiences will be pleased to watch this film, which is high on entertainment quotient, strong on visuals and packed with breathtaking action." Shruti Indira Lakshminarayana of Rediff described the film as a one-time watch and wrote "Jackie caters both to the class and the mass. It has a fair share of both sentiments and action and even comes with a message on human trafficking."

== Awards ==
- Best Film of 2010 – Suvarna Awards 2011
- Best Actor - Puneeth Rajkumar – Suvarna Awards 2011
