= Mandarthi =

Village in Karnataka, India

Mandarthi is a village in Udupi District, Karnataka, India, 12 kilometres from Brahmavar. The name derives from the Kannada phrase 'Manda-Aarathi', meaning 'holy light'.

== See also ==
- Kollur
- Udupi
- Anegudde
- Kundapura
- Saligrama
