= Anna Bond =

- Directed by: Duniya Soori
- Written by: Duniya Soori
- Produced by: Parvathamma Rajkumar
- Starring: Puneeth Rajkumar; Nidhi Subbaiah; Priyamani; Jackie Shroff
- Cinematography: Satya Hegde
- Edited by: Deepu. S. Kumar
- Music by: V. Harikrishna
- Production company: Poornima Enterprises
- Release date: 1 May 2012
- Running time: 136 minutes
- Country: India
- Language: Kannada
- Budget: ₹7 crore
- Box office: ₹12 crore

Anna Bond (transl. Brother Bond) is a 2012 Kannada-language romantic action film directed by Duniya Soori and produced by Parvathamma Rajkumar. The film stars Puneeth Rajkumar, alongside Priyamani, Nidhi Subbaiah, Rangayana Raghu, Avinash Yelandur, Sathish Ninasam and Jackie Shroff. The music was composed by V. Harikrishna, while the cinematography and editing were handled by Satya Hegde and Deepu. S. Kumar respectively.

Anna Bond was released on 1 May 2012 to mixed reviews from critics and became a commercial successful at the box office.

== Plot ==
Bond Ravi, a karate trainer and a reflexologist in Shingapoore, meets Meera on a bus and falls in love with her. One day, Meera and her sister Divya seeks Ravi's help to make a documentary film. Before leaving Shingapoore, Meera tells Ravi to achieve something in life. Ravi and his friend Chapathi Babu leave Shingapoore. On the way, a military person takes the duo to the house of Major Chandrakanth and orders them to tend to his wounds.

Charlie, a crime boss and terrorist, attacks Chandrakanth's house and brutally inquires about his daughter as Charlie's daughter was adopted by Chandrakanth. Bond Ravi helps Chandrakanth by knocking out Charlie, but Charlie escapes. Ravi and Meera, revealed to be Chandrakanth's daughter, grow closer and they begin a relationship. While looking for his daughter, Charlie kills Divya as he assumed her to be Chandrakanth's daughter, but Chandrakanth reveals that Divya is actually Charlie's daughter.

An enraged Charlie kidnaps Meera to make him understand the pain of losing his daughter. Ravi learns about this and interrogates Charlie's subordinates about his hideout. Ravi finds out about Charlie's hideout, arrives at the hideout and engages in a cage fight with Charlie's henchman. Ravi defeats the henchmen and defeats Charlie. Ravi and Charlie play a game of death in which Ravi kills Charlie, destroys the hideout and reunites with Meera. In the aftermath, Ravi continues his vigilante activities as Anna Bond.

== Cast ==
- Puneeth Rajkumar as Bond Ravi alias Anna Bond
- Nidhi Subbaiah as Divya
- Priyamani as Meera
- Jackie Shroff as Charlie
- Rangayana Raghu as Chapathi Babu
- Avinash Yelandur as Major Chandrakanth
- Balu Nagendra as Bala
- Petrol Prasanna as Prasanna
- Chi. Guru Dutt as David
- John Kokken as John Mathew
- Sathish Ninasam as Surya Honalkere
- Prashanth Siddi as Prashantha
- V. Manohar as Shingapoore Chandrappa
- Honnavalli Krishna as Manja
- Achyuth Kumar
- Apoorva
- Shashikala
- Vidya Murthy
- Jayashree Raj
- Varsha Krishnan
- Yamuna Murthy
- B. K. Shivaram
- Rajashekhar Kadamba
- Tumkur Mohan
- Raj Kumar
- Rockline Sudhakar

== Production ==
=== Development ===
Anna Bond marks the second collaboration of Puneeth Rajkumar and Duniya Soori after Jackie. The film was officially launched on 7 October 2011, a day after the release of Paramathma, and filming commenced on 10 October 2011. Being a high budget film, the film is said to have a story with a revolutionary concept, but with the entertainment quotient intact and a lot of computer graphics to support its narration. It is the 80th film of Poornima Enterprises and the technical team was the same one that worked for Jackie, including V. Harikrishna as music composer, Shashidhar Adapa as art director, Sathya Hegde as cinematographer and Imran Sardhariya for dance choreographer. There are five songs in the film, with lyrics penned by Yogaraj Bhat, Jayanth Kaikini and Kaviraj.

=== Filming ===
The film was shot in Bangalore, Coorg and Kanakapura, with two songs shot in Spain among the fanfare of locals to watch the song and dance.

== Soundtrack ==
The music was composed by V. Harikrishna and was released by Anand Audio. Yogaraj Bhat had revealed that the song "Yaaralli Soundu Maadodu" from Mr. and Mrs. Ramachari was supposed to be the title track of the film.

Anna Bond

Soundtrack album by V. Harikrishna
- Released: 2 April 2012
- Recorded: 2012
- Genre: Soundtrack
- Length: 20:55
- Label: Anand Audio Video
- Producer: V. Harikrishna

V. Harikrishna chronology
Shikari (2012)	Anna Bond (2012)	Katari Veera Surasundarangi (2012)
External audio
- Official Audio Jukebox on YouTube

Track list
No.	Title	Lyrics	Singer(s)	Length
1.	"Yenendu Hesaridali"	Jayanth Kaikini	Sonu Nigam, Shreya Ghoshal	4:21
2.	"Boni Aagada"	Yogaraj Bhat	Tippu	4:03
3.	"Kaanadanthe Maayavadanu (Remix)"	Chi. Udaya Shankar	Puneeth Rajkumar	4:16
4.	"Thumba Nodbedi"	Yogaraj Bhat	V. Harikrishna	4:09
5.	"He Is Anna Bond"	Yogaraj Bhat	Ranjith, Naveen Madhav, Ramya	4:06
Total length:				20:55

== Reception ==
Anna Bond received mixed reviews from critics with praise for its acting, cinematography, music and action sequences, but criticised its script.

=== Critical response ===
The Times of India gave 3.5/5 stars and wrote "Director Suri has chosen good action with a romantic touch, with Puneeth Rajkumar at his best." Srikanth Srinivasa of Rediff gave 2.5/5 stars and wrote "Anna Bond is wholly an action film despite a prominent romantic track in the film."

The Hindu wrote "Anna Bond satiates Puneeth Rajkumar's fans with thrilling action, lavish dances, picturesque locations and the star's omnipresence, but it disappoints those who expect Suri's signature style." The New Indian Express wrote "Soori has concentrated more on the technical aspects of the film, especially in the action sequences, with lesser importance given to the storyline."

== Accolades ==
Ceremony	Category	Nominee	Result
2nd South Indian International Movie Awards	Best Film	Raghavendra Rajkumar	Nominated
2nd South Indian International Movie Awards	Best Director	Duniya Soori	Nominated
2nd South Indian International Movie Awards	Best Cinematographer	Satya Hegde	Nominated
2nd South Indian International Movie Awards	Best Actor	Puneeth Rajkumar	Nominated
2nd South Indian International Movie Awards	Best Actress in a Supporting Role	Nidhi Subbaiah	Won
2nd South Indian International Movie Awards	Best Music Director	V. Harikrishna	Nominated
2nd South Indian International Movie Awards	Best Lyricist	Jayant Kaikini	Nominated
2nd South Indian International Movie Awards	Best Male Playback Singer	V. Harikrishna for "Tumba Nodbedi"	Won
2nd South Indian International Movie Awards	Best Male Playback Singer	Tippu for "Boni Aagada"	Nominated
2nd South Indian International Movie Awards	Best Dance Choreographer	Imran Sardhariya for "Tumba Nodbedi"	Won
