= Dudhani =

- city
- Nickname: Political city
- Location in Maharashtra, India
- Coordinates: 17.37°N 76.37°E
- Country: India
- State: Maharashtra
- District: Solapur
- Elevation: 443 m (1,453 ft)

Population (2001)
  - Total: 12,146

Languages
  - Official: Marathi
- Time zone: UTC+5:30 (IST)

Dudhani is a city and a municipal council in Solapur district in the state of Maharashtra, India.Dudhani is mainly holy place of Shri Sidharameshewar temple and for Sayyedpasha mosque.. Dudhani village specially known for its Unity in people with different religion.

== Geography ==
Dudhani is located at 17.37°N 76.37°E. The city is situated on the border with Maharashtra and is at an average elevation of 443 metres (1453 feet).

== Demographics ==
As of 2001 India census, Dudhani had a population of 12,146. Males constitute 50% of the population. Dudhani has an average literacy rate of 60%: male literacy is 72% while female literacy is only 49%. In Dudhani, 13% of the population is under 6 years of age.

Marathi is an official language. However, Kannada is the most widely spoken language by the natives.

Dudhani has the famous Shri Shantlingeshwar Virakatt Math and Shri Shidharameshwar temple and the annual Fair is held on 14 January. The town also holds Dargah Urus annually.

APMC marketing is an important business in Dudhani. Dudhani has both train and bus transport facilities.
