= Kaddipudi =

- Directed by: Duniya Soori
- Written by: Duniya Soori
- Screenplay by: Duniya Soori; Rajesh Nataranga
- Story by: Duniya Soori; Rajesh Nataranga
- Produced by: M. Chandru
- Starring: Shiva Rajkumar; Radhika Pandit
- Narrated by: Anant Nag
- Cinematography: Krishna
- Edited by: Deepu S. Kumar
- Music by: V. Harikrishna
- Production company: Sri Banashankari Chitralaya
- Distributed by: Jayanna Films
- Release date: 7 June 2013 (India)
- Running time: 143 minutes
- Country: India
- Language: Kannada
- Budget: ₹65 million (US$770,000)

Kaddipudi is a 2013 Indian Kannada language crime drama film directed by Duniya Soori and produced by M. Chandru. The screenplay was written by Soori and Rajesh Nataranga and the film stars Shiva Rajkumar as Anand alias Kaddipudi, a rowdy in Bangalore who vows to relinquish his life of crime and lead a normal life. The film also features Radhika Pandit, Rangayana Raghu, Anant Nag, Rajesh Nataranga, Balu Nagendra, Sharath Lohitashwa, Renuka Prasad and Avinash in pivotal roles.

The music of the film was composed by V. Harikrishna with lyrics for the soundtracks written by Yogaraj Bhat and Jayant Kaikini. Hedarabyadri song sung by Shachina heggar also received a State award for best play back singer year 2013-14 . The movie received mixed reviews from the critics. However, it was later hailed as a neo-noir experiment. Actor M.Chandru who had earlier produced the 2010 movie Swayamvara and was known as "Swayamvara" Chandru, went on to be known as "Kaddipudi" Chandru after producing this movie.

== Premise ==
Anand is a young man who is nicknamed "Kaddipudi" as his grandmother used to sell tobacco products where he is unwillingly being used as a pawn by the politicians named Shankarappa and Renuka, along with her son Indresh "Gaali". After an attack, Anand gets traumatized and decide to live a peaceful life away from the underworld, whose cause is supported by a cop named Sathya Murthy. Anand meets Uma, a junior artist at a shoot where they fall for each other and get married. However, their happiness is short lived as Shankarappa and the police corruption doesn't let him lead a normal life, which makes Anand to find a new way to lead a peaceful life.

== Cast ==
- Shiva Rajkumar as Anand alias Kaddipudi
- Radhika Pandit as Uma
- Rangayana Raghu as G.Kempaiah "Jinke"
- Balu Nagendra as Rekke Venkatesha
- Anant Nag as Sathya Murthy
- Rajesh Nataranga as Indresh/Gaali
- Sharath Lohitashwa as Shankarappa
- Renuka Prasad as Renukaji
- Pradeep V. as Oushadhi Mohana
- Avinash as ACP Vijaya Prasad
- Girija Lokesh
- Aindrita Ray as Daisy (cameo appearance)
- Vikas as Friday Hanumanthu
- Nandagopala as Manja
- Vicky Varun as Santhosh (uncredited)
- Maasthi Upparahalli as rookie cop (uncredited)

== Production ==
Kaddipudi started filming on 3 September 2012 and completed on 13 December 2012. The film was the first in Kannada cinema to not have any choreographers. The actors were asked to dance for each of the five songs in the film as they wished.

== Soundtrack ==
Kaddipudi

Soundtrack album by V. Harikrishna
- Released: 7 June 2013
- Genre: Feature film soundtrack
- Length: 16:33
- Label: D Beats
- Producer: V. Harikrishna

V. Harikrishna composed the music for the film and the soundtracks, also having co-sung the "Budu Buduke Maalinga" with Yogaraj Bhat. The lyrics for the soundtrack were penned by Bhat and Jayant Kaikini. The soundtrack album consists of five soundtracks.

No.	Title	Lyrics	Singer(s)	Length
1.	"Bere Yaro"	Jayant Kaikini	Vani Harikrishna	3:14
2.	"Budu Budukke Malinga"	Yogaraj Bhat	V. Harikrishna, Yogaraj Bhat	3:29
3.	"Hedarabyadre"	Janapada (Folk Song)	Shachina Heggar	3:28
4.	"Jinke Bedareruvaga"	Yogaraj Bhat	Priyadarshini	1:25
5.	"Soundharya Samara"	Yogaraj Bhat	Sonu Nigam	4:57
Total length:				16:33

=== Reception ===
The music of Kaddipudi was well received by critics. Kavya Christopher of The Times of India gave it a 3/5 rating and wrote, "Witty lyrics presented with an old-world charm have been music director V Harikrishna's USP, and with Kaddipudi, he recreates his magic."

== Release ==
The film which was initially planned for release in January 2013, but was postponed and released on 7 June 2013. The satellite rights of the film was sold to Udaya TV for ₹29 million (US$340,000) in January 2013. The film was released in 200 screens across Karnataka.

=== Critical response ===
Upon its theatrical release, Kaddipudi received mixed to positive reviews from critics. G. S. Kumar of The Times of India gave the film a rating of three and a half out of five and wrote, "Though the subject is strong, director Suri has made it look tame with lack-lustre narration, especially in the first half, and sequences which are dull and weak." and concluding praising the roles of acting, camera and the music departments in the film. Sify.com called it an "average" film and gave special praise to Aindrita Ray for her portrayal of a call girl in the film writing, "The trump card of the movie is Aindrita Ray, who sizzles for a brief time, in a special song. The actress, as a call girl, has performed Kathak." Performances of Shiva Rajkumar, Rangayana Raghu and Sharath Lohitashwa were also praised. Bangalore Mirror reviewed the film writing, "...it is the maturity in the narrative and sublime handling of the proceedings that strike you most."
