= Jayanth Kaikini =

Poet, Writer, Playwriter, Columnist

Dr Jayant Kaikini
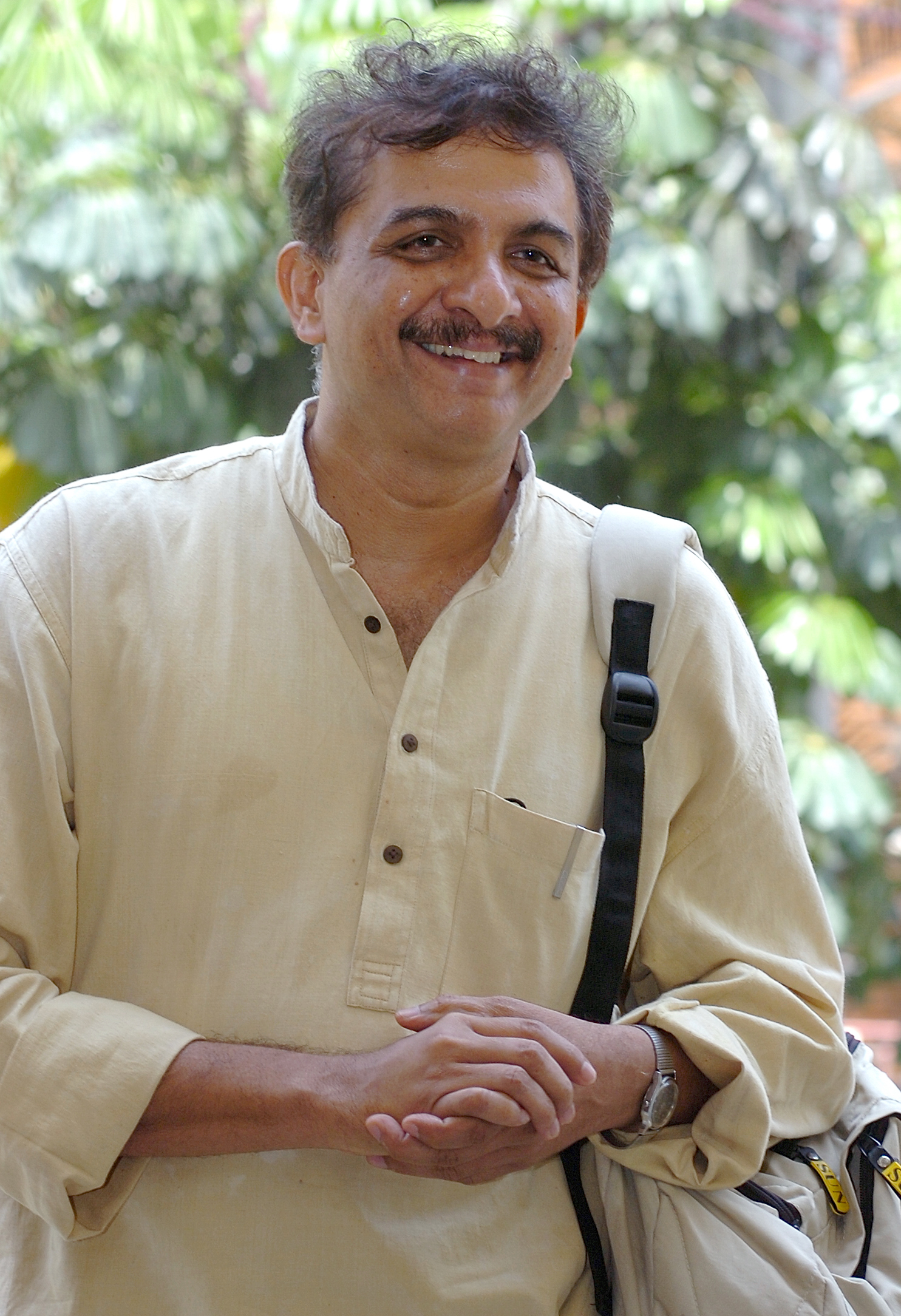
- Born: 24 January 1955 (age 71); Gokarna
- Occupations: Poet, Author, Essayist, Lyricist
- Spouse: Smita Kaikini
- Children: Srajana Kaikini Ritwik Kaikini
- Writing career
- Period: 1974–present
- Genres: Poetry, short stories, essays, lyrics
- Notable awards: DSC Prize for South Asian Literature Kusumagraj Award Karnataka Sahitya Academy Award

Jayant Kaikini (born 24 January 1955) is a poet, short story writer, playwright, columnist in Kannada and a lyricist and script writer in Kannada cinema. He has published seven short story collections, six poetry collections, four essay collections and three plays so far. He is valued as one of the best writers in Kannada literature and has revolutionized the field by giving it a fresh new perspective. He has bagged many notable awards like 'Karnataka Sahitya Academy' award(1974,1982,1989,1996), Kusumagraj National Literary Award (2010), Katha Award for Creative Fiction (1996), DSC South Asian Literature Prize (2018) amidst others. Kaikini is regarded as one of the most significant writers in Kannada today. Kaikini has been conferred the honorary doctorate from Tumkur University.

== Early life ==
Dr Kaikini was born in Gokarna to Gourish Kaikini, a thinker, litterateur and high school teacher, and Shanta Kaikini, a social worker. After graduating with an M.Sc. in Biochemistry from Karnataka University, Dharwad, he moved to Mumbai where he worked as a chemist in pharmaceutical companies for many years. Jayant Kaikini began his career working as a production chemist, eventually working also as a copywriter for advertising agencies in Bombay for 23 years before moving to Bangalore, where he held several key institutional positions - as founder of Kannada television channels Etv Kannada, Zee Kannada, becoming the literary editor of a monthly magazine Bhavana and hosting a widely popular television talk-show series Namaskara while being intellectually associated with the Kannada film industry writings dialogues, scripts.

== Career and Work ==
Kaikini has published a number of poetry collections including Rangadindondishtu Doora, Kothitheertha, Shravana Madhyana, Neelimale, Theredashte Bagilu. He is the author of short stories collections for Dagadoo Parabana Ashwamedha, Aamruthaballi Kashaya, Shabda Teera, Bannada kaalu, Toofan Mail, Ondu Jelebi, Charminar, Anarkaliya Safety Pin and Vichitraseneya Vaikhari. His work in translation No Presents Please has won widespread acclaim and accolades across the globe, including the DSC Prize for South Asian Literature. His first work in translation was Dots and Lines in 2004 published by Indialog.

In acclaimed literary critic G S Amur's words, "Jayant has a genuinely humanistic approach, to life and even his portraits of lonely and alienated individuals are not isolated from life in the community." "As a poet Jayant Kaikini finds his subject in the contradictions of existence which are rather acute for a young man uprooted from his rural environment and placed in an urban situation."

Jayant Kaikini's initial foray into lyricism for Kannada film industry includes movies like Girish Kasarvalli's Dweepa, Nagabarana's Chigurida Kanasu. Kannada film actor and singer Dr.Rajkumar sung his song "Bandhuve O Bandhuve", composed by V. Manohar. He is credited with revolutionizing the Kannada cinematic vocabulary with new and modern imagery that belongs to our lived worlds. Kaikini's hit song 'Anisutide' penned for Yograj Bhat's Mungaaru Male, shot him to an unprecedented adoration amidst listeners of Kannada cinema music. Thereafter, the combinations of Jayant Kaikini, Yograj Bhat, Mano Murthy and playback singers Song Nigam and Shreya Ghoshal produced repeated hit songs for films such as Gaalipata, Milana, Geleya, Moggina Manasu etc.

Before his lyrical career, Kaikini was popular for hosting the curated Namasakara series on four cultural laureates in Kannada namely, Dr Rajkumar, KuVemPu, D.R.Bendre and Shivarama Karanth. "Rasa Rushige Namaskara" produced for Etv Kannada was dedicated to Rashtrakavi Kuvempu. This show was very popular across Kannada speaking community in the world. "Kadala Theerada Bharghavanige Namaskara" was dedicated to Shivarama Karanth. He has been jury member on the reality show "Yede tumbi Haaduvenu" along with the legendary singer S. P. Balasubrahmanyam and Kannada music director and lyricist Hamsalekha.

Kaikini received the Karnataka Sahitya Academy award for his first poetry collection at the age of nineteen in 1974. He received the same award again in 1982, 1989 and 1996 for his short story collections. He has been awarded the Dinakara Desai award for his poetry, the B. H. Sridhar award for fiction, the Katha National award and Rujuwathu trust fellowship, the Kusumagraj Award, Masti Prashasti amidst several other honours for his writings as well as an honorary Doctorate from Tumkur University.

He lives in Bangalore with his wife Smita Kaikini, an analytic chemist by training and an archivist by passion who manages the Kaikini family archives. His daughter Srajana Kaikini is a philosopher, artist, curator, professor and son Ritwik Kaikini is an artist, music composer, writer, educator. Apart from Kannada, Jayant is fluent in Konkani, Marathi, Hindi and English.

== Selected works ==
=== Poetry ===
- Rangadindondishtu Doora (1974)
- Kotitheertha (1982)
- Shravana Madhyahna (1987)
- Neelimale (1997)
- Jayant Kaikini Kavithegalu (2003)
- Ondu Jilebi (2008)
- Vichitra Senana Vaikhari(2021)
- Ello maleyagide(2012: Collection of Film songs penned by him)

=== Short Stories ===
- Theredashte Baagilu (1982)
- Gaala (1982)
- Dagadoo Parabana Ashwamedha (1989)
- Amruthaballi Kashaya (1996)
- Jayanth Kaikini Kathegalu (2003)
- Bannada Kaalu (1999)
- Toofan Mail (2005)
- Charminaar (2012)
- No Presents Please... (2018)
- Anaarkaliya Safetypin (2021)

=== Essays ===
- Bogaseyalli Male (2001)
- Shabda Theera (2004)
- Touring Talkies (2009)
- Gulmohar (2018)
- Taari Dande (2024)

=== Plays ===
- Sevanti Prasanga (1997)
- Ithi Ninna Amrutha (1999)
- Jategiruvanu Chandeera (2004)
- Rupantara Natakagalu (2018)

=== Songs ===
- " Bandhuve " (Chigurida Kanasu)
- "Parichayisu" (Prema Pallakki)
- "We Are OK" (Prasad)
- "Ee Sanje Yakaagide" (Geleya)
- "Ninnindale" (Milana)
- "Male Nintu Hoda Mele" (Milana)
- "Anisutide Yaako Indu" (Mungaru Male)
- "Kunidhu Kunidhu Baare" (Mungaru Male)
- "Male Baruva Haagide" (Moggina Manasu)
- "Madhuvana Karedare" (Inti Ninna Preetiya)
- "Belad Minuguta" (Psycho)
- "Hey Mouna" (Krishna)
- "Minchaagi Neenu" (Gaalipata)
- "Poorva Para"
- "Maleya Haniyalli" (Januma Janumadallu)
- "Yaaro Kooda Ninna Haage" (Love Guru)
- "Yello Maleyaagide" (Manasaare)
- "Ondu Kanasu" (Manasaare)
- "Onde Ninna" (Manasaare)
- "Chalisuva Cheluve" (Ullasa Utsaha)
- "Nee Sanihake Bandare" (Maleyali Jotheyali)
- "Kudi Notave" (Parichaya)
- "Eruveya" ("Kinnare")
- "Turthinalli Geechida" (Chowka)
- "Madhura Pisumatige" (Birugali)
- "Hoovina Baanadanthe Yaarigu Kaanadanthe" (Birugaali)
- "Aaaramage Yiddenaanu" (Gokula)
- "neenendare nannolage" (Junglee)
- "Hrudayave Bayaside Ninnane" (Krishnan Love Story)
- "Ninna Gungalle" Lifeu Ishtene
- "Paravashanaadenu" (Paramathma)
- "Yenendu Hesaridali" (Anna Bond)
- "Neeralli Sanna" (Hudugaru)
- "Kanna Minche Jaahiratu Kaliyuva Hrudayake" (Victory)
- "Yenano Helalende" (Dyavre)
- "Jiya Teri Jiya Mere" (Bhajarangi)
- "Ninna Danigagi Ninna Karegagi" (Savaari 2)
- "Ello Mareyaagi " (Savaari 2)
- "Jeene Laga" (Jaathre)
- "Nenape Nitya Mallige" (Kendasampige)
- "Kanasali Nadesu" (Kendasampige)
- "Mareyada Pustaka" (Rathavara)
- "Mouna Thaalide Dhaari" (2014) (Ninnindale)
- "Malage Malage" (Rikki)
- "Yele Mareyali" (Rikki)
- "Helilla Yarallu Naanu" (Krishna-Rukku)
- "Muddagi Neenu" (Ganapa)
- "Nanna Kanasina Roovaari" (Sipaayi)
- "Sariyaagi" (Mungaru Male 2)
- Bere Yaro Baredantide Salanu (Kaddipudi)
- Kaagadada Doniyalli (Kirik Party)
- Aakasha Neene (Ambari)
- Roopasi (Mugulu Nage)
- Badukina Bannave (Tagaru)
- Balma (Tagaru)
- Jeeva Sakhi (Tagaru)
- Aleva Moda (Aleva Moda)
- Tajaa Samachara (Natasaarvabhowma)
- Gamanisu (Mungaru Male 2)
- Naanaadada Maatellva (Gaalipata 2)
- Neenu Bagehariyada (Gaalipata 2)
- Muthinantha Mathu (Shubhamangala)
- "Hejjeye Roopisu" (Nodidavaru Enanthare)
- "Malagiru Kanda" (Nodidavaru Enanthare)
- Udisuve (Pancharangi)
- Ninnaya (Pancharangi)

=== As dialogue writer ===
- Dweepa (2002)
- Chigurida Kanasu (2003)
- Poorvapara (2004)
- Ramya Chaitrakala (2006)

== Awards for films ==
Filmfare Awards

- Best Lyricist (2009): Gaalipata – "Minchagi Neenu Baralu"
- Best Lyricist (2010): Manasaare – "Yello Maleyaagide"
- Best Lyricist (2015): Kendasampige – "Nenape Nithya Mallige"
- Best Lyricist (2016): Mungaru Male 2 – "Sariyagi Nenapide"
- Best Lyricist(2021) : Act -1978 – Theme ("Teladu Mugile")

Nominated

- Best Lyricist (2010): Maleyali Jotheyali – "Nee Sanihake Bandare"
- Best Lyricist (2011): Krishnan Love Story – "Hrudayave"
- Best Lyricist (2012): Paramathma – "Paravashanaadenu"
- Best Lyricist (2013): Anna Bond – "Yenendhu Hesaridali"
- Best Lyricist (2014): Bhajarangi – "Jiya Teri"
- Best Lyricist (2017): Mugulu Nage – "Roopasi Summane"
- Best Lyricist (2018): Tagaru – "Badukina Bannave"
- Best Lyricist (2022): Gaalipata 2 – "Neenu Bagehariyada Haadu"
- Best Lyricist (2023): Kousalya Supraja Rama – "Preethisuve"

Karnataka State Film Awards

- Best Dialogue Writer for Chigurida Kanasu 2003–04
- "Best Lyricist" for Mungaru Male (2006–07)
- Best Story Writer for Illiralare Allige Hogalare 2019-20

== Awards for literary works ==
- Karnataka Sahitya Akademi Award for Rangadindondishtu Doora (1974)
- Karnataka Sahitya Akademi Award for Theredashte Baagilu (1982)
- Karnataka Sahitya Akademi Award for Dagadoo Parabana Ashwamedha (1989)
- Karnataka Sahitya Akademi Award for Amruthaballi Kashaya (1996)
- Kusumagraj National Award for Poetry (2010)
- Honorary Doctorate from Tumkur University in 2011 for his Contribution to Kannada Literature and Cinema.
- Dinakar Desai Award for Poetry (2004)
- B.H.Shridhara Award for Amruthaballi Kashaya (1997)
- Katha Award from Delhi for Amruthaballi Kashaya
- DSC Prize for South Asian Literature 2018 for his translated work No Presents Please...

== See also ==
H. S. Venkateshamurthy

K. S. Nisar Ahamed
