= Yogaraj Bhat =

Indian Kannada filmmaker

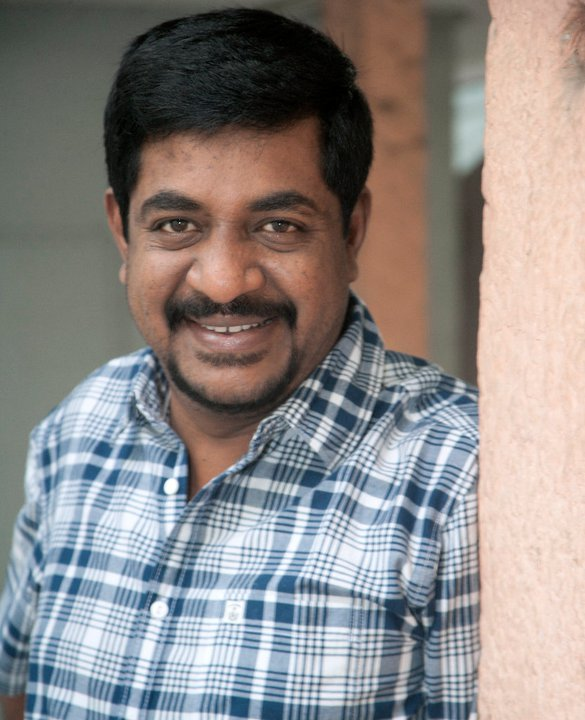
- Bhat in 2012
- Born: 8 October 1972 (age 53); Mandarthi, Udupi district, Karnataka, India
- Occupations: Director, lyricist, producer, screenwriter and actor
- Years active: 2001–present
- Spouse: Renuka Bhat

Yogaraj Bhat (born 8 October 1972) is an Indian film-maker, director, screenwriter, lyricist and producer who primarily works in Kannada cinema. He is most known for the 2006 film Mungaru Male. The film recorded the highest box-office collections in the history of Kannada cinema at the time of its release and the longest running film at a multiplex.

== Early life ==
Yogaraj Bhat was born in Mandarthi, in Udupi district in Karnataka. He grew up in Tilavalli, Haveri. He was the youngest son of Ramachandra and Jayalakshmi Bhat's seven children. He lost his father to a boat mishap.

== Career ==
=== Director ===
His film Mungaru Male collected estimated 50-75 crore, this was his third film, created history in Southern Film Industry. The film ran for 464 days – first in any language to run for a whole year continually in a multiplex, beating the records of the biggest Hindi Film Industry records. It naturally brought him many rewards, awards and appreciations, including Nine State Film Awards (including Best Director and Best Film Award) and Four Filmfare Awards (Best Film, Best Music, Best Lyrics and Best Cinematography). The movie has been remade in all South Indian languages & Bengali. The rights for the movie to be made in Hindi has been bought by Shri. Boney Kapoor. He has also directed Gaalipata, Manasare, Pancharangi, Paramatma, Drama, Vaastu Prakara, Dana Kayonu, Mugulu Nage and others.

=== Lyricist ===
Yogaraj Bhat has worked as lyricist in many Kannada movies Mungaru Male, Gaalipata, Junglee, Jackie, Manasaare, Pancharangi, Paramatma, Victory, Hudugaru, Drama, Kaddipudi, Bachchan, Adhyaksha, Gajakesari, Rajahuli and others.

He won Filmfare Award, Karnataka State Award for the song, 'Bombe Aadsonu' from the film Drama.

== Filmography ==
Key
†	Denotes films that have not yet been released

Year	Film	Credited as			Notes
Year	Film	Director	Writer	Producer	Notes
2001	Chakra	Yes	Yes		Television series
2003	Mani	Yes			
2004	Ranga S.S.L.C	Yes			
2006	Mungaru Male	Yes	Co-writer		
2008	Gaalipata	Yes	Yes		
2008	Inthi Ninna Preethiya			Yes	
2009	Manasaare	Yes	Story		
2010	Pancharangi	Yes	Co-writer	Yes	
2011	Paramathma	Yes	Co-writer		
2011	Lifeu Ishtene			Yes	
2012	Drama	Yes	Co-writer		
2013	Dyavre		Dialogue		
2014	Preethi Geethi Ityaadi		Co-writer		
2015	Vaastu Prakaara	Yes	Yes	Yes	
2016	Dana Kayonu	Yes	Yes		
2017	Mugulu Nage	Yes	Yes	Yes	
2019	Panchatantra	Yes	Screenplay	Yes	
2022	Gaalipata 2	Yes	Yes		
2023	Garadi	Yes	Screenplay		
2024	Karataka Damanaka	Yes	Co-writer		
2025	Manada Kadalu	Yes	Co-writer		
2025	Udaala		Dialogues	Yes	

=== As lyricist ===
- Note: he has also worked as a lyricist for all films that he worked as a writer.

Year	Film	Ref.
2007	Duniya	
2008	Inthi Ninna Preethiya	
2008	Aramane	
2008	Janumada Gelathi	
2009	Circus	
2009	Junglee	
2009	Male Barali Manju Irali	
2009	Devru	
2009	Raam	
2010	Suryakaanti	
2010	Sri Harikathe	
2010	Swayamvara	
2010	Krishnan Love Story	
2010	Cheluveye Ninne Nodalu	
2010	Shourya	
2010	Kari Chirathe	
2010	Kiccha Huccha	
2010	Yaksha	
2010	Eno Onthara	
2010	Super	
2011	Kanteerava	
2011	Kote	
2011	Gun	
2011	Rama Rama Raghurama	
2011	Kempegowda	
2011	Prince	
2011	Prema Chandrama	
2011	Dhool	
2011	Puttakkana Highway	
2011	Johny Mera Naam Preethi Mera Kaam	
2011	Lifeu Ishtene	
2011	Kaanchaana	
2011	Maduve Mane	
2011	Jarasandha	
2011	Vishnuvardhana	
2012	Chingari	
2012	Lucky	
2012	Anna Bond	
2012	Breaking News	
2012	Kiladi Kitty	
2012	Jaanu	
2012	Crazy Loka	
2012	Romeo	
2012	Shiva	
2012	Mr. 420	
2012	Prem Adda	
2012	Yaare Koogadali	
2013	Topiwala	
2013	Ziddi	
2013	Andar Bahar	
2013	Bachchan	
2013	Ale	
2013	Googly	
2013	Silk	
2013	Tony	
2013	Jayammana Maga	
2013	Victory	
2013	Brundavana	
2013	Dilwala	
2013	Sakkare	
2013	Raja Huli	
2013	Sweety Nanna Jodi	
2014	Dil Rangeela	
2014	Ulidavaru Kandanthe	
2014	Endendu Ninagagi	
2014	Kwatle Satisha	
2014	Maanikya	
2014	Gar Gar Mandla	
2014	Typical Kailas	
2014	Rose	
2014	Adyaksha	
2014	Simhadri	
2014	Bahaddur	
2014	Neenade Naa	
2014	Jai Bajarangabali	
2014	Mr. and Mrs. Ramachari	
2015	Missed Call	
2015	Jackson	
2015	Raja Rajendra	
2015	Mythri	
2015	Raate	
2015	Endendigu	
2015	Mrugashira	
2015	Ranna	
2015	Bullet Basya	
2015	Sapnon Ki Rani	
2015	Muddu Manase	
2015	Kendasampige	
2015	Charlie	
2015	Mr. Airavata	
2015	Vascodigama	
2015	Boxer	
2015	1st Rank Raju	
2015	Rathaavara	
2015	Prema Pallakki	
2016	Viraat	
2016	Tyson	
2016	Kala Bhairava	
2016	Ishtakamya	
2016	Jaggu Dada	
2016	Doddmane Hudga	
2016	Mukunda Murari	
2016	Santhu Straight Forward	
2016	Badmash	
2016	Mummy	
2016	Naanu Mattu Varalakshmi	
2017	Chowka	
2026	Toxic	

=== As actor ===
Year	Film	Role	Notes	Ref
2013	Dyavre	Bhimsen	Lead role	
2016	Parapancha	Kaalipeeli		
2019	Bell Bottom	Marakutika		
2019	Padde Huli		Cameo appearance	
2019	Avane Srimannarayana	Guptananda Swamiji	Cameo appearance	
2022	Lucky Man	Himself	Cameo appearance	
2023	South Indian Hero			
2025	Udaala		Cameo appearance	
2026	Uttarakaanda†	Patila	Filming	

== Awards ==
- 2013 – won Filmfare Award for Best Lyricist – Kannada for the song "Bombe Adsonu" from his own directorial film Drama.
- 2013 – won the Bangalore Times Film Awards in "Best Lyricist" category for the song "Bombe Adsonu".
