= Duniya Suri =

Indian film director

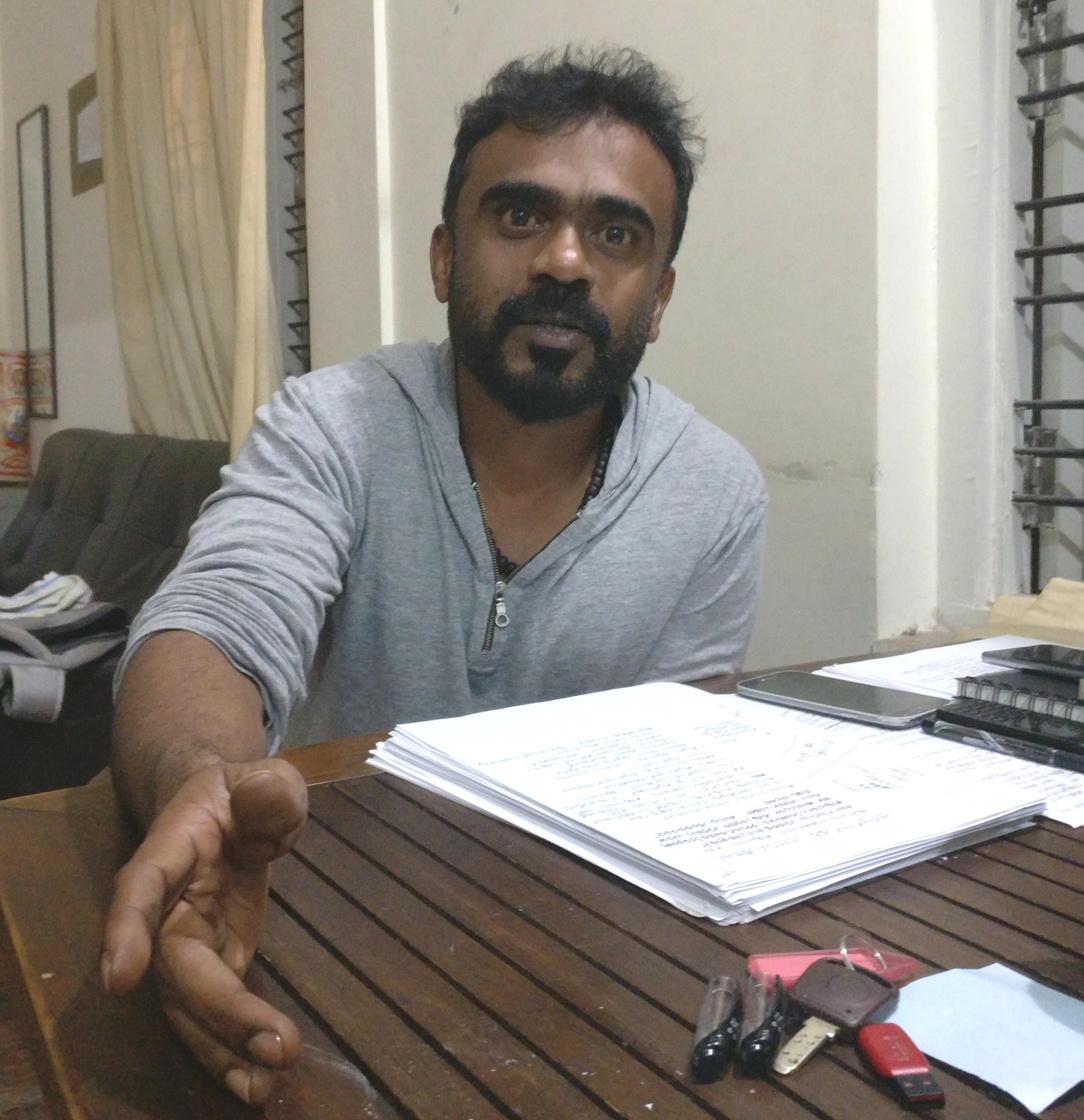
- Suri writing a script in 2017
- Born: Suresh Ramaswamy; Gottigere, Bangalore, India
- Other names: Sukka Suri, Suri/Soori
- Occupations: Filmmaker; Art director
- Years active: 2002–present
- Works: Filmography
- Style: Crime; Drama; Black comedy; Action
- Children: 1

Duniya Suri, credited onscreen as Suri and also referred to as Sukka Suri, is an Indian movie director. He became known as Duniya Suri in the wake of the success of his debut movie Duniya, for which he won the 2006–2007 Karnataka State Film Awards in the Best Screenplay category. Suri came to fame after the Duniya release, for its realistic style. The work brought a different dimension to Kannada cinema.

His second film Inthi Ninna Preethiya though critically acclaimed, performed poorly at the box office, while his next project Junglee was a greater critical and commercial success. Recent projects include the film Jackie with Puneeth Rajkumar which was declared the blockbuster of 2010 and was adjudged the Best Film of 2010 at the South Filmfare Awards. After the success of Jackie in 2010, Suri teamed up with Puneeth Rajkumar again in Anna Bond which released on 1 May 2012 and broke all previous Kannada cinema opening records.

== Early life ==
With a bachelor's degree in Visual Arts in 1999 from Kalamandira School of Arts - Bangalore, he extensively worked in visual arts, television and documentaries before getting the big break in his directorial debut film ‘Duniya’ in 2006. He started his own signboard business at an early age of 12 and successfully expanded his works to various parts of India through wall paintings, portraits, interior decoration, window displays and art reproduction works before deciding to pursue a degree in Visual Arts. His works in stage and art continued even during his Kalamandira days and as a reflection, his films are also well known for excellent art work.

== Filmography ==
- All films are in Kannada, otherwise noted.

Year	Film	Credited as			Notes
Year	Film	Director	Writer	Producer	Notes
2003	Mani	No	Screenplay	No	
2004	Ranga SSLC	No	Yes	No	
2006	Suntaragaali	Co-director	No	No	
2007	Duniya	Yes	Yes	No	
2008	Inthi Ninna Preethiya	Yes	Yes	Yes	
2009	Junglee	Yes	Yes	No	
2010	Jackie	Yes	Yes	No	
2012	Anna Bond	Yes	Yes	No	
2013	Kaddipudi	Yes	Co-writer	No	
2015	Kendasampige	Yes	Screenplay	Yes	
2016	Doddmane Hudga	Yes	Co-writer	No	
2018	Tagaru	Yes	Yes	No	
2020	Popcorn Monkey Tiger	Yes	Co-writer	No	
2023	Bad Manners	Yes	Screenplay	No	
TBA	Kage Bangara	Yes	Yes	Yes	Filming; delayed
TBA	Silent Sunila	Yes	Yes	No	co-writer: Agni Shridhar delayed

=== Television ===
Title	Notes	Ref.
Sadhane	As director	

== Awards ==
Year	Film	Award	Category	Result	Ref.
2006-07	Duniya	Karnataka State Film Awards	Best Screenplay	Won	
2008-09	Junglee	Karnataka State Film Awards	Best Screenplay	Won	
2013	Anna Bond	2nd SIIMA Awards	SIIMA Best Director	Nominated	
2019	Tagaru	Filmfare Awards	Best Director	Nominated	
2019	Tagaru	8th SIIMA Awards	SIIMA Best Director	Nominated	
2021	Popcorn Monkey Tiger	South Indian International Movie Awards	Best Director	Nominated	
