= List of Kannada films of 2019 =

A list of Kannada language films produced in the Kannada film industry in India in the year 2019.

- Films are generally released every Friday or Festival Day
- In addition films can be released on specific festival days.

== Box office collection ==
The highest-grossing Kannada films released in 2019, by worldwide box office gross revenue, are as follows.

The rank of the films in the following depends on the worldwide gross. The budget is only for knowledgeable purpose.

The highest worldwide gross of 2019
Rank	Title	Production company	Worldwide gross	References
1	Kurukshetra	Rockline Entertainments	₹90 crore (US$9.3 million)	
2	Avane Srimannarayana	Pushkar Films Sri Devi Entertainers Paramvah Studios	₹56 crore (US$5.8 million)	
3	Pailwaan	Zee Studios RRR Motion Pictures Production	₹53 crore (US$5.5 million)	
4	Yajamana	Media House Studios	₹50 crore (US$5.2 million)	
5	Natasaarvabhowma	Rockline Entertainments	₹28 crore (US$2.9 million)	

== January–March ==
Opening		Title	Director	Cast	Notes	Ref
J A N U A R Y	4	Aduva Gombe	Dorai–Bhagavan	Ananth Nag, Sanchari Vijay, Rishita Malnad, Sudha Belawadi, Nirosha Shetty	Produced by Kasthuri Nivasa Creations	
J A N U A R Y	4	Best Friend	Teshee Venkatesh	Dravya Shetty, Saakshi Meghana, Sumathi Patel	Produced by Sri Thirumala Cine Entertainment	
J A N U A R Y	4	Fortuner	Manjunath J. Anivaarya	Diganth, Sonu Gowda, Swathi Sharma, Naveen Krishna, Vinayak Joshi	Produced by Golecha Films	
J A N U A R Y	4	Prastha	Ravi Shathabhisha	Raja Vish, Varsha, Yadvik, Alankar Chandru	Produced by Abhigna Creations	
J A N U A R Y	11	Gini Helida Kathe	Nagaraja Uppunda	Dev Rangabhoomi, Geethanjali, Malathesh	Produced by Buddha Chitralaya	
J A N U A R Y	11	Lambodara	K. Krishnaraj	Yogesh, Akanksha Gandhi, Achyuth Kumar, Aruna Balraj	Produced by Vrishank Movie Makers	
J A N U A R Y	18	Birbal Trilogy Case 1: Finding Vajramuni	MG Srinivas	MG Srinivas, Rukmini Vasanth, Sujay Shastry, Vineeth Kumar, Madhusudhan Rao	Based on Korean movie New Trial; Produced by Crystal Park Cinemas	
J A N U A R Y	18	Lock	Parashuraam	Abhilash, Soundarya Ramesh, Shashikumar, Sharath Lohitashwa, Avinash	Produced by Parashuraam Picture House	
J A N U A R Y	25	Missed Call	Thimmampalli Chandru	Rajkiran, Arpitha, Mamatha Rahuth, Kishore	Produced by Karthik Dreams	
J A N U A R Y	25	Seetharama Kalyana	A. Harsha	Nikhil Gowda, Rachita Ram, R. Sarathkumar, Madhoo, P. Ravishankar, Sanjay Kapoor, Bhagyashree Patwardhan, Chikkanna	Loosely Inspired by Rarandoi Veduka Chudham; Produced by Channambika Films	
J A N U A R Y	25	Supplementary	S. Devaraj	Mahendra Munnoth, Kush Biradar, Shraddha Bhatt, Mandya Chandru	Produced by Hebbulivahana Mahadeshwara Productions House	
F E B R U A R Y	1	Anukta	Ashwath Samuel	Sampath Raj, Anu Prabhakar, Sangeetha Bhat, Karthik Attavar	Produced by Deyi Productions	
F E B R U A R Y	1	Attaiya Vs Handi Kayolu	Lokendra Surya	Arjun Krishna, Ruthu Chaithra, Lokendra Surya, A. Mahadeviah, Mandya Mahadev	Produced by Keerthana Movies	
F E B R U A R Y	1	Bazaar	Suni	Dhanveer Gowda, Aditi Prabhudeva, Sharath Lohitashwa, Sadhu Kokila	Produced by Bharathi Film Productions	
F E B R U A R Y	1	Bhootha Kaala	Sachin Baada	Anand Ganesh, Rakshita Bangera, Ananya Bhat, Srinivas Prabhu, Tennis Krishna	Produced by Sri Dindugada Maha Lakshmi Creations	
F E B R U A R Y	1	Mataash	S. D. Arvind	Samarth Narasimharaju, Aishwarya Sindhogi, Ganesh Raj, Rajani Bharadwaj, V. Manohar, Siddhanth Sundar	Produced by Goals & Dreamz, CROMS and Balamani Productions	
F E B R U A R Y	1	Trayodasha	S. S. Umeshh	Deepu, Chaitra, Archana, Ramesh Bhat	Produced by K. S. Movie Makers	
F E B R U A R Y	7	Natasaarvabhowma	Pawan Wadeyar	Puneeth Rajkumar, Rachita Ram, Anupama Parameswaran, B. Saroja Devi, Chikkanna, Sadhu Kokila	Produced by Rockline Entertainments	
F E B R U A R Y	8	Sarvagna Mattomme Hutti Baa	Shivakumar	Ramesh Bhat, Pavitra Lokesh, Srinivasa Murthy, Ramakrishna	Produced by Niranjana Chitra	
F E B R U A R Y	15	Bell Bottom	Jayatheertha	Rishab Shetty, Hariprriya, Achyuth Kumar, Yogaraj Bhat, Pramod Shetty	Produced by Golden Horse Production	
F E B R U A R Y	15	Chemistry of Kariyappa	Kumaar	Tabla Nani, Suchendra Prasad, Sanjana, Chandan Achar, Rockline Sudhakar	Produced by Msiri Productions	
F E B R U A R Y	15	Gahana	Preth Hassan	Adhitya Shetty, Sharanya Gowda, Inchara Bheemaiah, Ranjini	Produced by Om Shri Sai Ram Films	
F E B R U A R Y	22	Chambal	Jacob Varghese	Sathish Ninasam, Sonu Gowda, Kishore, Roger Narayan	Produced by Jacob Films	
F E B R U A R Y	22	Kaddu Mucchi	Vasanth Raj	Vijay Suriya, Meghashree, Chikkanna, Doddanna, Suchendra Prasad, B. V. Radha	Produced by Yashaswini Creations	
F E B R U A R Y	22	Kalbettada Darodekoraru	Deepak Madhuvanahalli	Nataraj Bhat, Hemanth Sushil, Shwetha R. Prasad	Produced by Bridge Films Association	
F E B R U A R Y	22	Striker	Pawan Trivikram	Praveen Tej, Shilpa Manjunath, Saurav Lokesh, Ashok Raj	Produced by Garudadri Productions	
F E B R U A R Y	22	Yaarige Yaaruntu	Pawan Trivikram	Orata Prashanth, Lekha Chandra, Kruttika Ravindra, Adithi Rao	Produced by SLR Enterprises	
M A R C H	1	Yajamana	Pon Kumaran; V. Harikrishna	Darshan, Rashmika Mandanna, Tanya Hope, Dhananjay, P. Ravishankar, Thakur Anoop Singh	Produced by Media House Studio	
M A R C H	8	Ammana Mane	Nikhil Manjoo	Raghavendra Rajkumar, Rohini Nagesh, Sheetal, Suchendra Prasad, Tabla Nani, Nikhil Manjoo	Based on a novel by Sri Lalithe; Produced by Srilalithe Chitralaya	
M A R C H	8	Gosi Gang	Raju Devasandra	Ajay Karthik, Yathiraj Jaggesh, Anusha Rai, Monica	Produced by Sri Lakshmi Venkateshwara cinemas	
M A R C H	8	Ibbaru B.Tech Students Journey	Vemuganti	Krrishna, Kiran Chatvani, Saikumar, Bullet Prakash, Ravi Kiran	Produced by Shree Shivani Arts and P.S. Movie Makers	
M A R C H	8	Madve	Hindu Krishna	Manju Mardhav, Arohi Gowda, Arya, Paramesh	Produced by Sri Maatha Pithru Entertainments	
M A R C H	8	Ondh Kathe Hella	Girish G.	Thandav Ram, Priyanka Mohan, Shakti Somanna, Pratheek, Thara Sadashivaiah, Sowmya Ramakanth	Produced by Petas Cine Cafe	
M A R C H	15	Arabbi Kadala Theeradalli	V. Umakanth	Krishne Gowda, Vaishnavi Bhat, Ranjitha	Produced by Saptagiri Creations	
M A R C H	15	DK Bose	Sandeep Mahantesh	Bhojaraj Vamanjoor, Risha Nijagun, Pruthvi Ambaar, Raghu Pandeshwar, Shobhraj Pavoor	Produced by VR Films	
M A R C H	15	Face 2 Face	Sandeep Janardhan	Rohith Bhanuprakash, Divya Uruduga, Suchendra Prasad, Veena Sundar, Purvi Joshi, Aaryan Achukatla	Produced by Sri Banashankari Creations	
M A R C H	15	Girgitle	Ravi Kiran	Pradeep Raj, Chandru, Guru, Rangayana Raghu, Vaishnavi Gowda, Advithi Shetty	Produced by Veeranjaneya Enterprises	
M A R C H	15	Naanu Nammudugi Kharchgond Mafia	Amar Saalva	Shyam Sundar, Amar Saalva, Ashwini, Shraddha Benagi	Produced by Power Talkies	
M A R C H	22	Adachanegagi Kshamisi	Bharath S. Navunda	S. Pradeep Varma, Srinivas Prabhu, K. S. Sridhar, Abhimanyu	Produced by Sree Bhoomika Productions	
M A R C H	22	Badri v/s Madhumathi	Shankar Narayana Reddy	Prathapawan, Akanksha Gandhi, Aravind Bolar, Jahagir, Jatthi, Kempegowda	Produced by Sree Durgaparameshwari Arts, Sri Vinayaka Maruthi Creations	
M A R C H	22	Chanaksha	Mahesh Chinmai	Dharma Keerthiraj, Archana Rao, Vinod Alva, Shobhraj	Produced by Sri Sai Baba Cini Enterprises	
M A R C H	22	Missing Boy	Raghuram	Gurunandan, Archana Jayakrishnan, Rangayana Raghu, Ravishankar Gowda, Jai Jagadish, Vijayalakshmi Singh	Produced by Kolla Entertainments	
M A R C H	22	Rajannana Maga	Kolar Seenu	Harish Jalgare, Akshatha Sreedhar Sastry, Charan Raj, Rajesh Nataranga, Sharath Lohitashwa	Produced by Universal Hattrik Combines	
M A R C H	22	Udgharsha	Sunil Kumar Desai	Thakur Anoop Singh, Sai Dhanshika, Tanya Hope, Kabir Duhan Singh, Kishore, Shraddha Das, Harshika Poonacha, Vamsi Krishna	Produced by D Creations	
M A R C H	29	Dharmapura	Hemanth Naik	Ramesh Paltya, Amrutha V. Raj, Rani Padmaja Chauhan	Produced by Rajavath Cine Productions	
M A R C H	29	Gandhada Kudi	Santhosh Shetty Kateel	Nidhi Sanjeeva Shetty, Shivadwaj Shetty, Ramesh Bhat, Jyothi Rai, Keisha Pai, Ashlin, Pranathi, Vignesh, Shreesha	Produced by Invenger Technologies	
M A R C H	29	Hanigalu Enano Helalu Horative	Nagaraj B. H.	Nagaraj B. H., Nagesh, Pallavi Chandra, Arun, Shivalinge Gowda, Madhu, Basavaraj, Jeevan, Abhishekh	Produced by Honnadevi Creations	
M A R C H	29	Londonalli Lambodhara	Raj Surya	Santhu Swindon, Shruti Prakash, Sampath Raj, Achyuth Kumar, Sadhu Kokila, Sudha Belawadi	Produced by London Screens	
M A R C H	29	Panchatantra	Yogaraj Bhat	Vihan Gowda, Sonal Monteiro, Rangayana Raghu, Akshara Gowda, Deepak Shetty	Produced by Yogaraj Cinemaas, JASP productions, Purple Patch	
M A R C H	29	Ranaranaka	Sudhakar Bananje	Shashi Raj, Siddu Moolimani, Sambrama Gowda, Tennis Krishna	Produced by Nischith Productions	
M A R C H	29	Ravi History	Madhu Chandra	Karthik Chandra, Pallavi Raju, Aishwarya Rao, Bala Rajwadi	Produced by Karnatik Films	
M A R C H	29	Rugged	Mahesh Gowda	Vinod Prabhakar, Chaitra Reddy	Produced by Amma Cine Creations	
M A R C H	29	Yada Yada Hi Dharmasya	Viraj	Vijay Raghavendra, Prajwal Devaraj, Shravya Rao, Saikumar, Sadhu Kokila, Padma Vasanthi, Mamatha Rahuth	Produced by Askhara Productions	

== April-June ==
Opening		Title	Director	Cast	Notes	Ref
A P R I L	5	Gowdru Cycle	Prashanth K. Yallampalli	Shashikanth, Bimbashree Ninasam	Produced by Adyar M3 International Films	
A P R I L	5	Kavacha	G. V. R. Vasu	Shiva Rajkumar, Kruthika Jayakumar, Isha Koppikar, Vasishta N. Simha, Jayaprakash, Ravi Kale	Remake of Malayalam film Oppam (2016); Produced by Hayagriva Movie Adishtana	
A P R I L	12	Jai Kesari Nandana	Shridhar Javoor	Gururaj Hosakote, Raju Talikote, Praveen Patri, Amrutha R. G.	Produced by Think Positive Studio	
A P R I L	12	Kavaludaari	Hemanth Rao	Rishi, Ananth Nag, Roshni Prakash, Suman Ranganathan, Achyuth Kumar	Produced by PRK Productions	
A P R I L	12	Night Out	Rakesh Adiga	Bharath, Shruthi Goradia, Akshay Pavar	Produced by Aryan Motion Pictures	
A P R I L	12	Virupaa	Punik Shetty	H. Vishunath, Manjunath, Prapthi Ratheesh, Charan, Aniketh	Produced by Dubios Productions	
A P R I L	19	Padde Huli	Guru Deshpande	Shreyas Manju, Nishvika Naidu, V. Ravichandran, Rakshit Shetty, Chikkanna	Remake of Tamil film Meesaya Murukku; Produced by Tejaswini Enterprises	
A P R I L	19	Payanigaru	Raj Gopi	Laxman Shivashankar, Ashwin Hasan, Raghavendra Naik, Nagaraj Rao	Produced by Kolankal Mahaganapathi Productions	
A P R I L	19	Punarvasu Nakshathra Mithuna Rashi	Vijay Karthik	Vijay Karthik, Anusha Pakali, Aswathi Balan		
A P R I L	19	Thrayambakam	Dayal Padmanabhan	Raghavendra Rajkumar, Anupama Gowda, RJ Rohith	Produced by Future Entertainment Films	
A P R I L	26	Janumada Snehitharu	Parashuram Navalli	Shaikh Mukthiyar, Rohith Shetti, Angaarika	Produced by Indian Film Industries	
A P R I L	26	Mahakavya	Sri Darshan	Vallabha Suri, Rashmi Prabhakar, Sri Darshan, Ananthavelu	Produced by S.R.K. Pictures	
A P R I L	26	Premier Padmini	Ramesh Indira	Jaggesh, Pramod Panju, Sudharani, Madhoo, Hitha Chandrashekar, H. G. Dattatreya, Vivek Simha	Produced by Shruthi Naidu Chitra	
M A Y	1	99	Preetham Gubbi	Ganesh, Bhavana, Ravishankar Gowda	Remake of Tamil film 96 (2018); Produced by Ramu Films	
M A Y	3	Gara	K. R. Muralikrishna	Rahman Hassan, Pradeep Aryan, Avanthika Mohan, Neha Patil, Johnny Lever, Sadhu Kokila	Based on R. K. Narayan's short story An Astrologer's Day; Produced by 25th Frame Films	
M A Y	3	Loafers	Mohan Shankar	Chethan Surya, Arjun Arya, Vihana Tej, Manu, Saakshi, Kempegowda, Sushma Raj	Produced by SNS Productions	
M A Y	3	Ombathane Adbhutha	Santhosh Kumar Batagere	Santhosh Kumar Batagere, Nayana Sai, Century Gowda, Raghu Pandeshwar	Produced by K K Brothers	
M A Y	10	Anushka	Devaraj Kumar	Amrutha Iyengar, Roopesh Shetty, Adi Lokesh, Sadhu Kokila	Produced by Sri Nanjundeshwara Production House	
M A Y	10	Jakanachari Avana Thamma Shuklachari	Raja Ravi Verma	Girish Jatti, Muni, Ninasam Ashwath, Vinay Surya, Kiran, Moogu Suresh	Produced by Rajpriya Productions	
M A Y	10	Khanana	Raadha	Aryavardhan, Karishma Barua, Yuva Kishore, Avinash, Vinaya Prasad, Om Prakash Rao, Bank Janardhan	Produced by S Nalige Productions	
M A Y	10	Soojidaara	Mounesh Badiger	Hariprriya, Yashwanth Shetty, Suchendra Prasad, Achyuth Kumar, Shreya Anchan, Chaitra Kotoor	Produced by Cine Sneha Talkies	
M A Y	10	Traya	Krishna Sai	Samyukta Hornad, Amogha Rahul, Madan, Shankar, Krishna Hebbale, Rajani Bharadwaj, Tennis Krishna	Produced by 2 States Films	
M A Y	17	Howla Howla	Somnath P. Patil	Amit, Aarthi Kulkarni, Vijay Chendoor, Prithvi Patil, Shobharaj	Produced by Amma Akshara Arts	
M A Y	17	Kaarmoda Saridu	Uday Kumar P. S.	Manju Rajanna, Adhvithi Shetty, Divya, Sridhar	Produced by Kudremukha Talkies	
M A Y	17	Mooka Vismitha	Gurudutt Sreekanth	Gurudutt Sreekanth, Shubha Raksha, Sandeep Malani, Chandra Keerthi, Vanishree Bhatt	Based on T. P. Kailasam 's drama ToLLugaTTi; Produced by Malani Talkies	
M A Y	17	Ratnamanjarii	Prasiddh	Raj Charan, Akhila Prakash, Pallavi Raju, Shraddha Salian, Jai Mohan, Raju Vaidhya	Produced by SNS Cinemas and Sharavathi Films	
M A Y	24	D/O Parvathamma	Shankar. J	Hariprriya, Suraj Gowda, Sumalatha, Prabhu Mundkur	Produced by Disha Entertainments	
M A Y	24	Digbhayam	Amith	Amith, Kavitha Bisht, Monisha Gowda, Hamsa Gowda	Produced by 1234 Cine Creations	
M A Y	24	Putani Power	M. Gajendra	Mahendra Munoth, Aradhana Bhat, Doddarange Gowda, Harini, Preethi Raj	Produced by S V Creations	
M A Y	24	Race	Hemanth Krishna	Diwakar, Santhosh, Nakul Govind, Raksha Shenoy	Produced by S V R Productions Pvt Ltd.	
M A Y	24	Weekend	Sringeri Suresh	Milind, Sanjana Burli, Ananth Nag, Gopinath Bhat, Neenasam Raghu	Produced by Mayoora Motion Pictures	
M A Y	31	Amar	Nagashekar	Abhishek Gowda, Tanya Hope, Devaraj, Sadhu Kokila, Sudharani, Chikkanna	Produced by Sandesh Productions	
M A Y	31	Kamarottu Checkpost	A. Paramesh	Sanath, Uthpal Gowda, Swathi Konde, Ahalya Suresh, Gaddappa	Produced by A. P. Productions & Swapna Cine Creations	
M A Y	31	Omme Nishabda Omme Yuddha	Sree Nag	Prabhu Mundkar, Samyuktha Hegde, Ramakrishna, Chandrashekar, Aravind Rao	Produced by Rolling Dreams Entertainment	
M A Y	31	Suvarna Sundari	Surya MSN	Poorna, Sakshi Chaudhary, Jayapradha, Saikumar, Avinash, Kota Srinivasa Rao	Inspired by Devil and Junior Mandrake; Produced by S. Team Pictures; A Kannada – Telugu bilingual film	
J U N E	7	Keerthigobba-2	Prathap M	Partha, Sanjay, Siddhu, Soumya, Radha, Shwetha	Produced by Thriveni Productions	
J U N E	7	Majjige Huli	Ravindra Kotaki	Deekshith Venkatesh, Roopika, Manasa, Suchendra Prasad, Mohan Juneja, Ramesh Bhat	Produced by SLV Arts	
J U N E	14	Hangover	Vittal Bhat	Bharath, Mahathi Bhikshu, Nandhini Nataraj, Shahan Ponnamma, Shafi	Produced by Ramanee Productions	
J U N E	14	I Love You	R. Chandru	Upendra, Rachita Ram, Sonu Gowda, Brahmanandam	Produced by Sri Siddeshwara Enterprises	
J U N E	14	Vijayadwaja	Srinath Vasishta	Naveen Ragappa, Nagesh Yadav	Produced by Sree Siddeshwara Movies	
J U N E	21	Haftha	Prakash Hebbala	Vardhan Thirthahalli, Bimbashree Ninasam, Raghava Nag, Soumya Theethira	Produced by Maithri Productions	
J U N E	21	Krishna Garments	Siddu Poornachandra	Bhaskar Ninasam, Chandu Gowda, Rashmita, Rajesh Nataranga, Vardhan Thirthahalli	Produced by Adithya Cine Combines	
J U N E	21	Saarvajanikaralli Vinanthi	Krupasagar T. N.	Madan Raj, Amrutha, Ramesh Pandit, Mandya Ramesh	Produced by Dakshina Krupa Sindhu Entertainments	
J U N E	23	Arishadvarga	Arvindh Kamath	Avinash, Samyukta Hornad		
J U N E	28	One Way – Hogbahudu Barangilla	Rushi	Kiran Raj, Robinson, Raj Bahaddur, Shilpa, Rajesh R, Rekha		
J U N E	28	Rustum	Ravi Varma	Shiva Rajkumar, Vivek Oberoi, Shraddha Srinath, Mayuri Kyatari, Rachita Ram, Harish Uthaman	Produced by Jayanna Combines	
J U N E	28	Samayada Hinde Savari	Rajguru Hoskote	Rahul Hegde, Prakruthi, Kiran Vatti, Ranjith Shetty	Produced by Bunts Lion Film International	

== July–September ==
Opening		Title	Director	Cast	Notes	Ref
J U L Y	5	Devaki	Lohith. H	Priyanka Upendra, Kishore, Sanjeev Jaiswal, Aishwarya Upendra	Produced by RCS Cinemas	
J U L Y	5	Dheera Kannadiga	Balarama	Master Chinmay, Anjanappa, Mandya Chandru	Produced by Balaram Movies	
J U L Y	5	Onti	Shree	Arya N., Meghana Raj, Ninasam Ashwath, Sharath Lohitashwa, Girija Lokesh	Produced by Sai Ram Creations	
J U L Y	12	Chitrakatha	Yashasvi Balaaditya	Sujeeth Rathod, Sudharani, Dileep Raj, B. Jayashree, Tabla Nani	Produced by Jaji Productions	
J U L Y	12	Full Tight Pathe	S. L. G. Puttanna	Surya, SLG Puttanna, Beeradra, T. Raju		
J U L Y	12	Inthi Nimma Bhaira	K. J. Chikku	Aryan Venkatesh, Pragathi, Sunetra Pandit, Bangalore Nagesh, Sanju Basayya	Produced by SSKB Productions	
J U L Y	12	Operation Nakshatra	K. R. Madhusudhan	Niranjan Wadayar, Aditi Prabhudeva, Yajna Shetty, Srinivas Prabhu	Produced by 5 Star Films	
J U L Y	12	Yaanaa	Vijayalakshmi Singh	Vaibhavi, Vainidhi, Vaisiri, Sumukha, Chakravarthi, Abhishek, Jai Jagadish, Ananth Nag, Suhasini Maniratnam, Chikkanna, Jai Jagadish, Ramakrishna, Rangayana Raghu, Sundar Raj	Produced by ACME Movie International	
J U L Y	19	10ne Tharagathi	Mahesh Sindhuvalli	Thejas Gurukar, Shivu Chawadi, Jagdeesh, Puttu, Mahadeva Murthy, Bhavya, Anjali Jan, Geetha,	Produced by Ciniranjan Movie Makers	
J U L Y	19	Aadi Lakshmi Puraana	V. Priya	Nirup Bhandari, Radhika Pandit, Tara, Sowmya Jaganmoorthy, Joe Simon	Produced by Rockline Entertainment Pvt Ltd.	
J U L Y	19	Dichki Design	Rana Chandu	Rana Chandu, Nimika Rathnakar, Manohar Gowda, Ravi S Nenapininda, Prashanth	Produced by Golden Lens Cinema	
J U L Y	19	Male Billu	Nagaraj Hiriyuru	Sharath, Sanjana Anand		
J U L Y	19	Sinnga	Vijay Kiran	Chiranjeevi Sarja, Aditi Prabhudeva, Tara, P. Ravishankar, Shivaraj K. R. Pete	Remake of Tamil film Kutti Puli; Produced by UKM Studios	
J U L Y	26	Dasharatha	M. S. Ramesh	V. Ravichandran, Sonia Agarwal, Abhirami, Avinash, Rangayana Raghu, Meghashree	Produced by M. S. R. Productions	
J U L Y	26	Jerk	Mahantesh Madakari	Sachin Siddhu, Asha Bhandari, Gaddappa, Krishna Raj, Bullet Prakash	Produced by Mayura Productions	
J U L Y	26	Mahira	Mahesh Gowda	Raj B. Shetty, Virginia Rodrigues, Chaithra J Achar, Balaji Manohar	Produced by The Jackfruit Productions	
J U L Y	26	Nandanavanadol	Sandeep Shetty	Santhosh Shetty, Bharath Rai, Kampana, Smitha, Pooja Sharan, Anand Yadwad	Produced by Yakshasiri Creations	
A U G U S T	2	Bekkigondu Mooguthi	Leslie	Thilak Shekar, Sushma Raj	Produced by Maya Movie Makers	
A U G U S T	2	Bhanu Weds Bhoomi	J. K. Aadhi	Nuthan Kannaiah, Rishitha Malnad, Rangayana Raghu, Shilpa Murthy, Shobhraj	Produced by Poorvi Productions	
A U G U S T	2	Vajramukhi	Aditya Kunigal	Neethu, Dilip Pai, Sanjana Naidu	Produced by Poorvi Productions	
A U G U S T	9	Ekate	Ramananda Mitra	Bhooshan, Prapulla, Krishnappa		
A U G U S T	9	Kempegowda 2	Shankar Gowda	Komal Kumar, S. Sreesanth, Yogesh, Rashika Sharma	Produced by Panchamukhi Hanuman Cine Production	
A U G U S T	9	Kurukshetra	Naganna	Darshan, Ambareesh, V. Ravichandran, Arjun Sarja, Nikhil Gowda, Sneha, Sonu Sood, P. Ravishankar, Shashikumar, Meghana Raj, Danish Akhtar Saifi, Hariprriya, Bharathi Vishnuvardhan	Produced by Vrushabhadri Productions and Distributed by Rockline Distribution	
A U G U S T	15	Gimmick	Naganna	Ganesh, Ronica Singh, Chi. Guru Dutt, Shobaraj, Ravishankar Gowda, Sundar Raj	Remake of Tamil film Dhilluku Dhuddu (2016); Produced by Samy Pictures	
A U G U S T	15	Gubbi Mele Brahmastra	Sujay Shastry	Raj B Shetty, Kavitha Gowda, Pramod Shetty, Girish Shivanna	Produced by Crystal Park Cinemas	
A U G U S T	15	One Love 2 Story	Vasishta Bantanur	Santhosh Manu, Madhu Nag Gowda, Prakruthi Vijaykumar, Vachana, Aadhya Aradhana	Produced by Silver Screen Film Factory, SMLNS Production	
A U G U S T	16	Manassinata	R Ravindra	Yamuna Srinidhi, Manjunath Hegde, H.G.Dattatreya, Master Harshith	Produced by Nikethan Cinemas, Neralu Media	
A U G U S T	23	Fan	Darshith Bhat	Aryan, Advithi Shetty, Sameeksha, Prasanna Shetty, Vijay Kashi, Ravi Bhat, Mandya Ramesh	Produced by SLN Cinemas	
A U G U S T	23	Nanna Prakara	Vinay Balaji	Priyamani, Kishore, Mayuri Kyatari, Niranjan Deshpande, Arjun Yogi, Girija Lokesh, Pramod Chakravarthy	Produced by G.V.K. Combines	
A U G U S T	23	Randhawa	Sunil Acharya	Bhuvann Ponnannaa, Apoorva Srinivasan, Jahangir, Aravind Rau, Manjunath Hegde	Produced by Sukruthi Chitralaya	
A U G U S T	23	Udumba	Shivaraj	Pavan Shourya, Chirashree Anchan, Irfan, Sharath Lohitashwa, Sanjana	Produced by Sri Chandra Productions	
A U G U S T	23	Vijayaratha	Ajay Surya K	Vasanth Kalyan, Arpitha Gowda, Archana Jois, Rajesh Nataranga, Hanumanthe Gowda	Produced by Vruksha Creations	
A U G U S T	30	Punyathgittiru	Raj B. N.	Kuri Ranga, Mamatha Rahuth, Divyashree, Ishu	Produced by Amrani Enterprises	
S E P T E M B E R	6	Vishnu Circle	Lakshmi Dinesh	Gururaj Jaggesh, Divya Gowda, Samhita Vinya, H. G. Dattatreya, Rockline Sudhakar	Thirupathi Picture Palace	
S E P T E M B E R	12	Pailwaan	S. Krishna	Sudeep, Suniel Shetty, Aakanksha Singh, Kabir Duhan Singh, Sushant Singh	RRR Motion Pictures Production	
S E P T E M B E R	20	Baro Baro Geleya	Srikanth Acharya	Shiva Chandra, Anjum, Gandhi Ram, Pooja	Kothari Productions	
S E P T E M B E R	20	Moorane Kannu	Nazeer K. N.	Sachin Nayak, Shreya, Seeru, Tara, Prakash D. J.	ARS Cine Production	
S E P T E M B E R	20	Thripura	K. Shankar	Ashwini Gowda, Sridhar, Dharma, Tennis Krishna, Lakshman	Sri Ankura Creations	
S E P T E M B E R	27	Aatakkuntu Lekkakkilla	Ram J. Chandra	Sanchari Vijay, Mayuri Kyatari, Duniya Rashmi, Achyuth Kumar	Vasundhara Krithik Films	
S E P T E M B E R	27	Geetha	Vijay Nagendra	Ganesh, Parvathi Arun, Prayaga Martin, Shanvi Srivastava, Sudharani, Devaraj, Ravishankar Gowda, Rangayana Raghu	SS Films; Golden Movies	
S E P T E M B E R	27	Kiss	A. P. Arjun	Viraat, Sreeleela, Sadhu Kokila, Chikkanna, H. G. Dattatreya, Avinash	Based on the South Korean film 100 Days with Mr. Arrogant (2004); Produced by Arjun Films	
S E P T E M B E R	27	Navarathri	Lakshmikanth Chenna	Vikram Manjunath, Hrudaya Avanthi, Shivamanju, Karthik, Pranav Murthy	Coffees Cinema; Aryath Cine Entertainments	
S E P T E M B E R	27	Super Hero	Snehamayi Krishna	Master V K Vikas, M M Prajwal, M K Likhitha, M M Gajesh Gowda, Mandya Ramesh, Mandya Anand	Divyashree Chithra Nirmana Samsthe	

== October-December ==
Opening		Title	Director	Cast	Notes	Ref
O C T O B E R	2	Mohandas	P. Sheshadri	Param Swamy, Samarth Hombal		
O C T O B E R	4	Adyaksha in America	Yoganand Muddan	Sharan, Ragini Dwivedi, Disha Pandey, Sadhu Kokila, Rangayana Raghu	Remake of Malayalam film Two Countries (2015); Produced by People Media Factory	
O C T O B E R	4	Premasura	Hariharapura Nagaraj	Sheetal Raj, Mrudula, M. S. Umesh, Subburaju, Mico Nagaraj	Produced by Sri Harihareshwara Movies	
O C T O B E R	11	Devaru Bekagiddare	Kenja Chetan Kumar	Prasad Vasisht, Shivaram, Master Anoop, Sathyanath	Produced by Horizon Movies	
O C T O B E R	11	Ellidde Illi Tanaka	Thejasvi	Srujan Lokesh, Hariprriya, Tara, Yashas Surya, Avinash, Radhika Rao, Sadhu Kokila	Produced by Lokesh Productions	
O C T O B E R	11	Gnanam	Varadaraj Venkataswamy	Shylashri, Anil Kumar, Radhika A. Shetty	Produced by Vasantha cine creations	
O C T O B E R	11	Inject 0.7	Niranjan	Niranjan, Roopa Gowda, Prajna Mallur, Vinesh. Master Dhyan, Pranaya Murthy		
O C T O B E R	11	Lungi	Arjun Lewis	Pranav Hegde, Ahalya Suresh, Radhika Rao, Deepak Rai Panaje	Produced by Khara Entertainment	
O C T O B E R	11	Siddhi Seere	Brahmanand Reddy	Sudha Narasimharaju, Mahalakshmi Urs, Ravishankar Mirle, Swarnachandra	Produced by KISS International	
O C T O B E R	11	Vrithra	Gautham Iyer	Nityashree, Prakash Belawadi, Sudharani, Tharun Sudhir	Produced by Arvi Enterprises	
O C T O B E R	18	Bharaate	Chetan Kumar	Sriimurali, Sreeleela, Saikumar, Ayyappa P. Sharma, P. Ravishankar	Produced by Sri Jagadguru Movies	
O C T O B E R	18	Gantumoote	Roopa Rao	Nischith Korodi, Teju Belawadi, Surya Vasishta, Sharath Gowda, Sri Ranga	Produced by Ameyukthi Studios	
O C T O B E R	18	Savarna Deergha Sandhi	Veerendra Shetty	Veerendra Shetty, Krishnaa, Ravi Bhat, Surender Bantwal	Produced by Veeru Talkies	
O C T O B E R	25	Andavaada	Chala	Jai, Anusha Ranganath, Harish Rai, K. S. Sridhar	Produced by Madhushree Golden Frames	
O C T O B E R	25	Moorkal Estate	Pramod Kumar	Praveen Reddy, Prakruthi, Vijay Eshwar, Abhishek Jain, Riya	Produced by Bhadravathi Movie Makers	
N O V E M B E R	1	C++	Suresh Leon Rey	Viraaj, Vishwaveeru, Nagendra Urs	Produced by	
N O V E M B E R	1	Dandupalya 4	K. T. Nayak	Suman Ranganathan, Banerjee, Rockline Sudhakar, Venkat	Produced by Venkat Movies	
N O V E M B E R	1	Ranganayaki	Dayal Padmanabhan	M. G. Srinivas, Aditi Prabhudeva, Lasya Nagaraj, Suchendra Prasad, Chakravarthy Chandrachud	Based on a novel by Dayal Padmanabhan; Produced by YesVee Entertainment	
N O V E M B E R	1	Star Kannadiga	Manjunath V. R.	Manjunath V. R., Shalini Bhat, Rockline Sudhakar	Produced by	
N O V E M B E R	8	Aa Drushya	Shiva Ganesh	V. Ravichandran, Achyuth Kumar, Nisarga Lakshman, Chaithra Achar, Yash Shetty, Chethan Vicky	Remake of Tamil film Dhuruvangal Pathinaaru (2016); Produced by K Manju Cinemas	
N O V E M B E R	8	Eesha Mahesha	M. D. Kaushik	Narayana Swamy, Rakesh, Jayashree Raj, Sharanya Gowda, Hamsaraj, Bhagyashree, M. D. Kaushik, Ravi Bhat	Produced by Sri Malemadeshwara Enterprises	
N O V E M B E R	8	Girmit	Ravi Basrur	Ashlesh Raj, Shlagha Saligrama, Shravya Maravanthe, Nagaraj Japthi, Thanisha Kone, Aradhya Shetty, Adithya Kundapura, Sinchana Koteshwara	Produced by Omkar Movies & Ravi Basrur Movies	
N O V E M B E R	8	Kapata Nataka Paatradhaari	Krish	Balu Nagendra, Sangeetha Bhat, Kari Subbu, Shankar Narayan, Prakash Thuminad	Produced by Garuda Creations	
N O V E M B E R	8	Paapi Chirayu	Nataraj J K Gowda	Raj B Gowda, Kuri Prathap, Niranjan Deshpande, Manju Pavagada, Chaithra	Produced by B Basavaraju Movies	
N O V E M B E R	8	Ranabhoomi	Chiranjeevi Deepak	Niranjan Odeyar, Karunya Ram, Sheethal Shetty, Ramesh Bhat, Rathavara Loki, Danial Kuttappa	Produced by Manasi Films	
N O V E M B E R	15	Ayushman Bhava	P. Vasu	Shiva Rajkumar, Rachita Ram, Nidhi Subbaiah	Produced by Yogish Dwarkish	
N O V E M B E R	15	Mane Maratakkide	Manju Swaraj	Sadhu Kokila, Chikkanna, Kuri Pratap, Ravishankar Gowda, Sruthi Hariharan, Karunya Ram	Remake of Telugu film Anando Brahma(2017); Produced by S.V.Babu	
N O V E M B E R	15	Relax Satya	Naveen Reddy.G	Prabhu Mundkur, Manvitha Kamath	Inspired by the British movie The Disappearance of Alice Creed; Produced by Mohan Kumar	
N O V E M B E R	15	Nam Gani B.Com Pass	Abhishek Shetty	Abhishek Shetty, Aishani Shetty	Produced by Brindavan Enterpresis	
N O V E M B E R	22	Kalidasa Kannada Meshtru	Kaviraj	Jaggesh, Meghana Goankar, Ambika	Produced By Uday Films	
N O V E M B E R	22	Kannad Gothilla	Mayuraa Raghavendra	Hariprriya, Sudharani, Sudha Belawadi, Mayuraa Raghavendra	Produced by Shri Ramaratna Productions	
N O V E M B E R	22	Neuron	Vikas Pushpagiri	Yuva, Kabir Duhan Singh, Neha Patil, Vaishnavi Menon		
N O V E M B E R	22	Manaroopa	Kiran Hegde	Dileep Gowda, Anusha Rao, Nisha, Shiva.B.K		
N O V E M B E R	22	Rajalakshmi	Kantharaju ST	Naveen Thirthalli, Rashmi Gowda, Honnavalli Krishna, Tennis Krishna		
N O V E M B E R	29	Mookajjiya Kanasugalu	P. Sheshadri	B. Jayashree	Based on the novel Mookajjiya Kanasugalu by K. Shivaram Karanth; Produced by Navyachitra Creations	
N O V E M B E R	29	Brahmachari	Chandra Mohan	Sathish Neenasam, Aditi Prabhudeva, H.G. Dattatreya		
N O V E M B E R	29	Mundina Nildana	Vinay Bharadwaj	Praveen Tej, Radhika Narayan, Ajay Raj, H.G. Dattatreya		
N O V E M B E R	29	Damayanthi	Navarasan	Radhika Kumaraswamy	Inspired by Anando Brahma; Produced by Sri Lakshmi Vrushadhri Productions	
N O V E M B E R	29	Naane Raja	Srinivas Shivara	Suraj Krishna, Sonika Gowda		
N O V E M B E R	29	Margaret	M. S. Sreenath	Ahalya Suresh, Saurav Lokesh, Rajesh Nataranga		
D E C E M B E R	6	Katha Sangama	7 directors	Rishab Shetty, Hariprriya, Kishore, Avinash	Based on Hernando Téllez's short story Lather And Nothing Else and Groundhog Day; Produced by Rishab Shetty	
D E C E M B E R	6	Alidu Ulidavaru	Arvind Sastry	Atul Kulkarni, Pawan Kumar, Sangeetha Bhat, Rockline Sudhakar		
D E C E M B E R	6	Babru	Sujay Ramaiah	Suman Nagarkar, Prakruthi Kashyap, Sunny Moza, Mahi Hiremath		
D E C E M B E R	6	Hagalu Kanasu	Dinesh Baboo	Master Anand, Saniha Yadav, Neenasam Ashwath, Chitkala Biradar		
D E C E M B E R	6	19 Age is Nonsense?	Suresh M Gini	Madhumita, Balu, Manush, Lakshmi Mandya, Kavya Prakash		
D E C E M B E R	6	Avalakki Pavalakki	Durga Prasad	Sinchana Ponnava, Deepak Patel, Raghavendra		
D E C E M B E R	12	Odeya	M. D. Sridhar	Darshan, Sana Timmaiah	Remake of Veeram; Produced by N Sandesh	
D E C E M B E R	20	Sarvajanikarige Suvarnavakasha	Anoop Ramaswamy	Rishi, Dhanya Balakrishna	Based on Guy de Maupassant's short story The Necklace	
D E C E M B E R	27	Avane Srimannarayana	Sachin Ravi	Rakshit Shetty, Shanvi Srivastava, Achyuth Kumar, Pramod Shetty	Produced by Pushkara Mallikarjunaiah	
D E C E M B E R	27	Baddi Magan Lifeu	Prasad-Pavan	Sachin Shreedar, Aishwarya Rao, Bala Rajwadi		
