= Mookajjiya Kanasugalu =

Mookajjiya Kanasugalu may refer to:

- Mookajjiya Kanasugalu (novel), a 1968 Kannada novel by K. Shivaram Karanth
- Mookajjiya Kanasugalu (film), a Kannada film based on the novel
