= Sanjith Hegde =

Indian singer

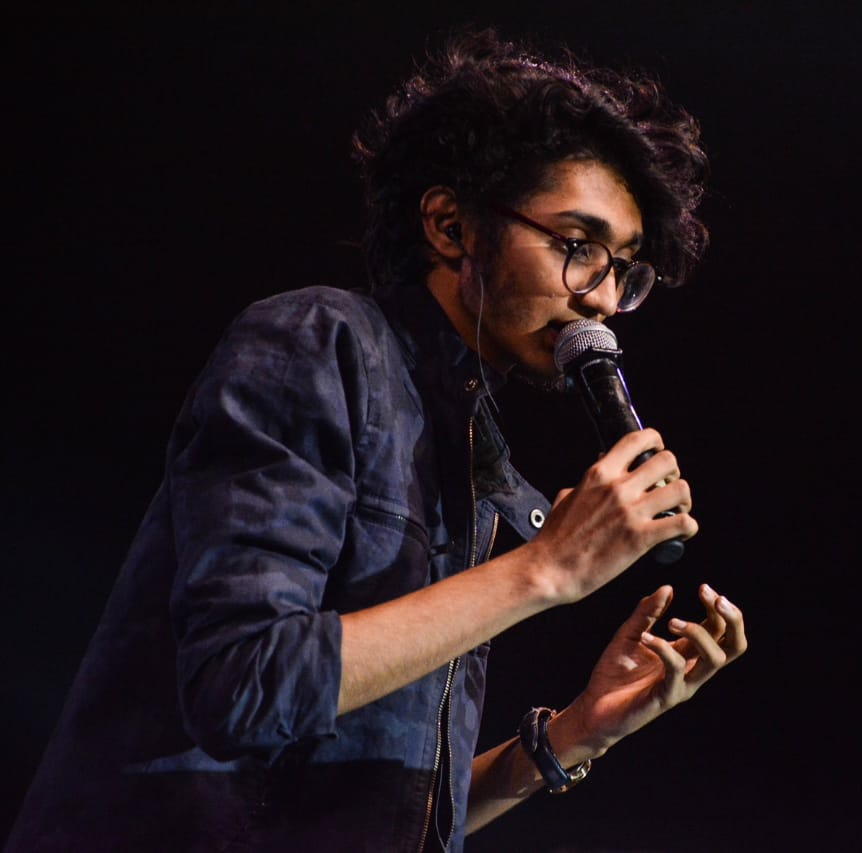
- Hegde in 2018

Background information
- Born: Bengaluru, Karnataka, India
- Genres: Hindustani Classical, Pop, R&B, Blues & Rock
- Occupations: Singer; songwriter

Sanjith Hegde is an Indian playback singer. Hegde has sung songs in Kannada, Telugu, Tamil, Malayalam and Hindi. His rendition of "Gunu Gunuguva" from the film Dalapathi composed by Charan Raj topped the music charts for a year. Sanjith won the Mirchi Music Awards South Best Upcoming Male Vocalist for the song "Kush Kush" from the film Chamak.

== Career ==
Sanjith Hegde became popular after participating in the Kannada singing reality show Sa Re Ga Ma Pa – Season 13. Following which Sanjith also participated in the Tamil show Sa Re Ga Ma Pa – Seniors, which was broadcast on Zee Tamil.

Sanjith made his singing debut with the song "Gunu Gunuguva" from the film Dalapathi composed by Charan Raj in 2017. Sanjith made his Tamil debut in the film Kalakalappu 2 with the song "Thaarumaaru", and Telugu debut in the film Krishnarjuna Yudham with the song "I Wanna Fly", in 2018. Sanjith's popularity as an individual artist and as a playback singer grew after that juncture, with a number of popular new songs.

== Awards and nominations ==
- 2018: Nominated for SIIMA Award for Best Playback Singer (Male) for "Kush Kush".
- 2018: Won the Mirchi Music Awards South Best Upcoming Male Vocalist.
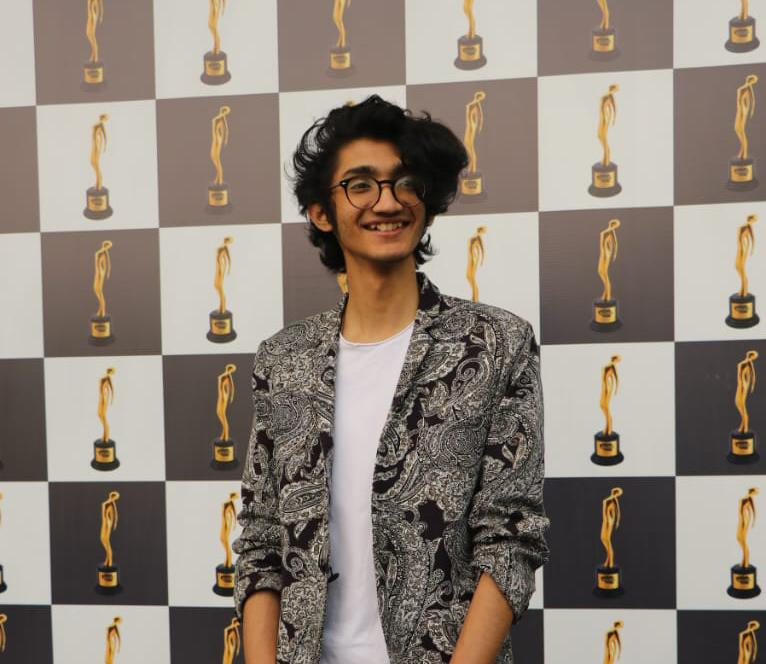
  Sanjith Hegde at the Gaana Mirchi Music Awards South, 2018
- 2019: Won the Kannada International Music Academy Award for Best Playback Singer Male – Film Music.
- 2019: Nominated for SIIMA Award for Best Playback Singer (Male) for "Shaakuntle Sikkalu".
- 2019: Won - Filmfare Award for Best Playback Singer (Male) - Kannada - "Shaakuntle Sikkalu"- Naduve Antaravirali
- 2021: Won SIIMA Award for Best Playback Singer (Male)- Kannada- "Marali Manasagide"- Gentleman.

== Filmography ==
Year	Name	Role	Language	Notes
2021	Pitta Kathalu	Vikram	Telugu	Netflix film

== Discography ==
=== Singles ===
Year	Track	Artist(s)	Language	Lyrics
2018	Prema	Sanjith Hegde, Phani Kalyan	Kannada	Kiran Kaverappa
2023	Thunai Varuven	Sanjith Hegde, Jasleen Royal	Tamil	Vignesh Ramakrishna
2023	Baadal	Sanjith Hegde, Aditya Sharma	Hindi	
2024	Gulaabo	Sanjith Hegde	Hindi	
2024	Nange Allava	Sanjith Hegde	Kannada	Nagarjuna Sharma
2025	Quote That	King, Sanjith Hegde	Hindi	
2025	Taare Bindigeya	Sanjith Hegde	Kannada	Purandara Dasa & Dhananjay Ranjan
2025	Banda Kaam Ka	Chaar Diwaari, Sanjith Hegde,	Hindi	
2026	Kareyole	Sanjith Hegde	Kannada	Dhananjay Ranjan
2026	Kehdo Na	Sanjith Hegde	Hindi	Siddhant Kaushal
2026	Cold Showers	Sanjith Hegde	Hindi	Sunny MR, Gautham Hebbar

=== As composer ===
Year	Album	Songs	Score	Language	Notes
2021	Pitta Kathalu		Yes	Telugu	Netflix anthology film, composed for segment xLife with Soorya Praveen
2024	Dange/Por	Yes		Hindi	2 songs
2024	Dange/Por	Yes		Tamil	2 songs
2024	Bhoomi	Yes		Kannada	Performed the track "Mayavi" on Bhoomi (2024) with Sonu Nigam

=== As playback singer ===
Year	Film/Album	Song	Composer	Language
2017	College Kumar	"Marali Marali"	Arjun Janya	Kannada
2017	Chamak	"Kush Kush"	Judah Sandhy	Kannada
2018	Kalakalappu 2	"Thaarumaaru"	Hiphop Tamizha	Tamil
2018	Tagaru	"Gumma Banda Gumma (Police Theme)"	Charan Raj	Kannada
2018	Jayamahal	"Preethi Endarenu"	Judah Sandhy	Kannada
2018	Shaibhya	"Kannalle Karedaga"	Karthik Sharma	Kannada
2018	Krishnarjuna Yudham	"I Wanna Fly"	Hiphop Tamizha	Telugu
2018	Dalapathi	"Gunu Gunuguva"	Charan Raj	Kannada
2018	Ondu Motteya Kathe	"Ondu Motteya Kathe"	Poornachandra Tejaswi	Kannada
2018	Olu Munsami	"Inky Pinky Ponky"	Sathish Babu	Kannada
2018	Kannadakkaagi Ondannu Otti	"Rasthe Pakka"	Arjun Janya	Kannada
2018	Kannadakkaagi Ondannu Otti	"Neene Geechida"	Arjun Janya	Kannada
2018	Onthara Bannagalu	"Aashcharya Aago"	Bharath BJ	Kannada
2018	Sankashta Kara Ganapathi	"Nooru Choorina"	Ritvik Muralidhar	Kannada
2018	Vaasu Naan Pakka Commercial	"Laila Oh Laila"	B. Ajaneesh Loknath	Kannada
2018	Iruvudellava Bittu	"Kannugale"	V. Sridhar	Kannada
2018	Naduve Antaravirali	"Shaakuntle Sikkalu"	Manikanth Kadri	Kannada
2018	Saamy Square	"Molagapodiye"	Devi Sri Prasad	Tamil
2018	Dinga	"Sum Sumne"	Suddho Roy	Kannada
2018	Ayogya	"Hinde Hinde Hogu"	Arjun Janya	Kannada
2018	Pyaar Prema Kaadhal	"Hold Me Now"	Yuvan Shankar Raja	Tamil
2018	Bazaar	"Yeko Yeno"	Ravi Basrur	Kannada
2018	Ondraga Originals	"Bodhai Kodhai"	Karthik	Tamil
2018	Fortuner	"Sirigeya Niralli"	Poornachandra Tejaswi	Kannada
2018	Fortuner	"O Deva"	Poornachandra Tejaswi	Kannada
2018	Ghajinikanth	"Karu Karu Vizhigalil"	Balamurali Balu	Tamil
2018	Joshelay (web series)	"Neenaagiru"	Dossmode	Kannada
2018	Relax Satya	"Kshana Kshana"	Anand Rajavikram	Kannada
2018	Imaikkaa Nodigal	"Imaikkaa Nodiyil"	Hiphop Tamizha	Tamil
2018	Saamy (Telugu Dubbed version)	"Mirchi Poduma"	Devi Sri Prasad	Telugu
2018	DK Bose	"Naanu Hudukuthiruva Haadi"	Dolwin Kolalagiri	Kannada
2018	Hangover	"Dinavu Ondu Rochaka"	Veer Samarth	Kannada
2018	1 May	"Meera"	Sathish Babu	Kannada
2018	1 May	"Kali Kali Kadalu"	Sathish Babu	Kannada
2018	Thayige Takka Maga	"Hrudayake Hedarike"	Judah Sandhy	Kannada
2019	Birbal Trilogy Case 1: Finding Vajramuni	"Ragini Madam"	Kala Charan	Kannada
2019	Mataash	"Aakaashake Yeni Haakuva"	S. D. Arvind	Kannada
2019	Ratnamanjarii	"Fashion"	Harshavardhan Raj	Kannada
2019	Lambodara	"Lambodara Looseada"	Karthik Sharma	Kannada
2019	Seetharama Kalyana	"O Jaanu O Jaanu"	Anup Rubens	Kannada
2019	Natasaarvabhowma	"Natasaarvabhowma Title Song"	D. Imman	Kannada
2019	Vantha Rajavathaan Varuven	"Paravaigal"	Hiphop Tamizha	Tamil
2019	Vantha Rajavathaan Varuven	"Pattamarangal"	Hiphop Tamizha	Tamil
2019	Kavaludaari	"Nigooda Nigooda"	Charan Raj	Kannada
2019	99	"Anisuthide"	Arjun Janya	Kannada
2019	Natpe Thunai	"Pallikoodam"	Hiphop Tamizha	Tamil
2019	Natpe Thunai	"Veedhikor Jaadhi"	Hiphop Tamizha	Tamil
2019	Natpe Thunai	"Natpe Thunai – Title Track"	Hiphop Tamizha	Tamil
2019	Premier Padmini	"Payanava"	Arjun Janya	Kannada
2019	Amar	"Marethuhoyithe"	Arjun Janya	Kannada
2019	Comali	"Nanba Nanba"	Hiphop Tamizha	Tamil
2019	Angelina	"Iva Yen Aalu"	D. Imman	Tamil
2019	Pailwaan	"Kannmaniye"	Arjun Janya	Kannada
2019	Pehlwaan – Hindi	"Dil Jaaniye"	Arjun Janya	Hindi
2019	Pahalwan – Telugu	"Kanne Pichuka"	Arjun Janya	Telugu
2019	Bailwaan – Tamil	"Kannu Maniye"	Arjun Janya	Tamil
2019	Pailwaan – Malayalam	"Kanninmaniye"	Arjun Janya	Malayalam
2019	Chikati Gadilo Chithakotudu	"Nuvve Nuvve"	Balamurali Balu	Telugu
2019	ABCD: American Born Confused Desi	"America Naa America"	Judah Sandhy	Telugu
2019	Gimmick	"Lachmi Lachmi"	Arjun Janya	Kannada
2019	Padde Huli	"I Love The Way U Hate Me"	B. Ajaneesh Loknath	Kannada
2019	One Love 2 Story	"Mattondsala Love Aaytu"	Siddharth (S.I.D)	Kannada
2019	Dasharatha	"Jagava Belaguva"	Guru Kiran	Kannada
2019	Dasharatha	"Life Is Beautiful"	Guru Kiran	Kannada
2019	Kiladi Police	"Kannalle Karedalu"	Ellwyn Joshua	Kannada
2019	Fan	"Hi Hello Sir"	Vikram-Chandana	Kannada
2019	Operation Nakshatra	"Naa Parichayavaagade"	Veer Samarth	Kannada
2019	Night Out	"Aakashake"	Sameer Kulkarni	Kannada
2019	Kaarmoda	"Nalku Dinada Lifidu"	Wake Up Band	Kannada
2019	Sagutha Doora Doora	"Love You Amma"	Manikanth Kadri	Kannada
2019	Weekend	"Nodi Swamy"	MANOJ	Kannada
2019	Aadi Lakshmi Puraana	"Boom Boom"	Anup Bhandari	Kannada
2019	Demo Piece	"Darlingu"	Arjun Ramu	Kannada
2019	Lungi	"Waste Body"		Kannada
2019	Naan Sirithal	"Dhom Dhom"	Hiphop Tamizha	Tamil
2020	Arishadvarga	"Naane Bhoomi"	Udit Haritas	Kannada
2020	Arishadvarga	"Bhangi Sedo Bhangi"	Udit Haritas	Kannada
2020	Popcorn Monkey Tiger	"Maadeva"	Charan Raj	Kannada
2020	Dia	"Soul of Dia"	B. Ajaneesh Loknath	Kannada
2020	Gentleman	"Marali Manasagide"	B. Ajaneesh Loknath	Kannada
2020	Malgudi Days	"Kanasina Kannye Kannamunde"	Gagan Baderiya	Kannada
2020	Malgudi Days	"Kanneeru Kenney Mele"	Gagan Baderiya	Kannada
2020	Drona	"Shake Ma Sainora"	Ramkrish	Kannada
2020	India vs England	"London London"	Arjun Janya	Kannada
2020	India vs England	"Preeti Illade"	Arjun Janya	Kannada
2020	Bill Gates	"Thangali Mellage"	Nobin Paul	Kannada
2020	Khaki	"Yaare Neenu"	Rithvik Muralidhar	Kannada
2020	Rowdy Police	"Kannu Kannu"	Sam C. S.	Kannada
2020	Haage Vaikunthapuradalli	"Samajavaragamana"	Thaman S	Kannada
2020	Demo Piece	Darlingu	Arjun Prema	Kannada
2021	Munduvareda Adhyaya	"Naa Baredaithu"	Johny-Nitin	Kannada
2021	Shardula	"Ondu Sanna Thappanu"	Sathish Babu	Kannada
2021	Salaga	"Salaga Title Song"	Charan Raj	Kannada
2021	Salaga	"Maleye Maleye"	Charan Raj	Kannada
2021	Ninna Sanihake	"Ninna Sanihake Title Song"	Raghu Dixit	Kannada
2021	Ninna Sanihake	"Yeko Idyeko"	Raghu Dixit	Kannada
2021	Kalave Mosagara	"Yenidu Jagave Hosadu"	K Lokesh	Kannada
2021	Kalavida	"Kanasondide Ba Saridoogisuva"	Vivek Chakravarthy	Kannada
2021	Yellow Board	"Omme Nodidare"	Adhvik	Kannada
2021	SriKrishna@gmail.com	"Kudi Notada"	Arjun Janya	Kannada
2021	Ek Love Ya	"Yaare Yaare"	Arjun Janya	Telugu; Tamil; Malayalam
2022	Macherla Niyojakavargam	"Adirindey"	Swara Sagar Mahathi	Telugu
2022	Brahmāstra: Part One – Shiva	"Kesariya Rangu"	Pritam	Kannada
2022	Vikrant Rona	"Hey Fakira"	B. Ajaneesh Loknath	Kannada
2022	Love Mocktail 2	"Ide Swarga"	Nakul Abhyankar	Kannada
2022	Brahmāstra: Part One – Shiva	"Deva Deva"	Pritam	Kannada
2022	Banaras	"Belakina Kavithe"	B. Ajaneesh Loknath	Kannada
2022	Coffee with Kadhal	"Hi Hello"	Yuvan Shankar Raja	Tamil
2023	Chengiz (D)	"Teri Meri Baatein"	Kaushik-Guddu	Hindi
2023	Agent	"Endhe Endhe"	Hiphop Tamizha	Telugu
2023	Sari	"Mala Ka Bhase"	B. Ajaneesh Lokanath	Marathi
2023	Extra Ordinary Man	"Brush Vesko"	Harris Jayaraj	Telugu
2023	Siddharth Roy	"Cheliya Chalu"	Radhan	Telugu
2024	Ayalaan	"Chella Rangi"	A. R. Rahman	Tamil
2024	Guntur Kaaram	"Dum Masala"	Thaman S	Telugu
2024	Premalu	"Kutty Kudiye"	Vishnu Vijay	Malayalam
2024	Article 370	"Ishq Tera"	Shashwat Sachdev	Hindi
2024	Article 370	"Main Hoon"	Shashwat Sachdev	Hindi
2024	Por	"Asaraadhe"	Himself; Dhruv Visvanath	Tamil
2024	Por	"Ping Pong"	Himself; Dhruv Visvanath	Tamil
2024	Dange	"Le Le Pangey"	Himself; Dhruv Visvanath	Hindi
2024	Dange	"Aa Bhid Jaa Re"	Himself; Dhruv Visvanath	Hindi
2024	Kalki 2898 AD	"Ta Takkara"	Santhosh Narayanan	Telugu
2024	Aarambham	"Tholi Nesthama"	Sinjith Yerramilli	Telugu
2024	Saripodhaa Sanivaaram	"Ullaasam"	Jakes Bejoy	Telugu
2024	Saripodhaa Sanivaaram - (D)	"Ullaasam"	Jakes Bejoy	Tamil
2024	Saripodhaa Sanivaaram - (D)	"Ullaasam"	Jakes Bejoy	Kannada
2024	Saripodhaa Sanivaaram - (D)	"Ullaasam"	Jakes Bejoy	Hindi
2025	Alappuzha Gymkhana	"Everyday"	Vishnu Vijay	Malayalam
2025	Raju James Bond	"Kanmani"	Anoop Seelin	Kannada
2025	Aap Jaisa Koi	"Dhuan Dhuan"	Rochak Kohli	Hindi
2025	Mahavatar Narsimha	"Om Namo Bhagavate Vasudevaya	Sam C. S.	Hindi
2025	Just Married	"Mangalyam Thanthunanena"	B. Ajaneesh Lokanath	Kannada
2025	Little Hearts	"Rajagadiki"	Sinjith Yerramilli	Telugu
2025	Dude - (D)	"Baagundu Po"	Sai Abhyankkar	Telugu
2026	The RajaSaab	"Rebel Saab"	Thaman S	Telugu
2026	Balaramana Dinagalu	"Shuru Shuru"	Santhosh Narayanan	Kannada
