= Mojo (2017 film) =

MOJO
- MOJO Kannada Poster
- Directed by: Sreesha Belakvaadi
- Screenplay by: Sreesha Belakvaadi
- Produced by: Gajanan Bhat; Satish Pathak; Santosh Patil; Manayya Bellignur
- Starring: Manu; Anoosha
- Cinematography: Ananth Urs
- Edited by: Rathan
- Music by: Songs: S. D. Arvind; Score: B. Ajaneesh Loknath
- Production company: Poorvi Arts
- Release date: 27 October 2017
- Running time: 110 minutes
- Country: India
- Language: Kannada
- Budget: 1.5 crore INR

Mōjo is a 2017 Indian Kannada drama film written and directed by Sreesha Belakvaadi.

== Plot ==
Protagonist Mohan (acted by Manu) experiences rushes of his Subconscious Power, in particular the ability to see future (Precognitive power of Sixth Sense). Mohan works through different psychiatrists to understand his mental explosions and ends up meeting his college mate Maya (acted by Anoosha). While Maya has a contradicting story to tell, Mohan believes his experiences are real. What follows from there forms the plot and subplot of MOJO; Mohan's sixth sense entraps him into a crisis ― a bizarre maze of Murder, Crime, Suspect, Love and Enigma. Whether the murder happened at all, whether Mohan's Sixth Sense is real (or imaginative), whether Maya the character exists (or a hallucination) ― all get answered as the movie hits a bewildering climax leaving the audience in a state of "Want to watch second time".

== Cast ==
- Manu Basavaraj
- Anoosha Krishna
- Aanya Shetty
- Sandeep Sridhar
- Smita Kulkarni
- Nandan Jonty

== Development And Production ==
Written and Directed by Sreesha Belakvaadi, MOJO was produced under the banner of Poorvi Arts. Shot most parts of movie in Bangalore, MOJO had some brief shoots in parts of Mangalore, Udupi and Chikkamagalur. The technical department of MOJO are from seasoned background. B Ajaneesh Lokanath has composed background score for MOJO. Ajaneesh has won several awards including Filmfare, IIFA and Karnataka State Award for his works in Rangitaranga, Ulidavaru Kandante and latest sensation Kirik Party. SD Arvind has composed music for MOJO. SD Arvind is famous for his Doori song of LAST BUS, that was played in the international BBC - a first time accomplishment from Kannada Film Industry. State Award winner Ananth Urs is the DoP. Krishnanunni N R is the Sound Designer and Mixer State award winner Chintan Vikas, Zee TV SaReGaMaPa champ Ankita Kundu and Nationally recognized legendary singer Rajesh Krishnan have sung the numbers for MOJO.

== Awards and nominations ==
MOJO premiered at Fremont USA FOG International Film Festival on 8 August 2017, where it won the best regional film award .

Year	Award	Category	Recipient	Result
2017	FOG International Film festival awards	Best Regional film	Poorvi Arts; Gajanan Bhat	Won
2017	Golden Gate International Film festival	Best Experimental film	Poorvi Arts; Gajanan Bhat	Won
2017	Calcutta International CULT Film Festival	Outstanding Achievement Award	Sreesha Belakvaadi	Won
2017	Eurasia International Film Festival	Best Experimental Film	Sreesha Belakvaadi	Won
2017	Glendale International Film Festival	Best Experimental Film	Sreesha Belakvaadi	Nominated
2017	Golden Gate International Film Festival	Best Visual Effects	Gajanan Bhat	Nominated
2017	Golden Gate International Film Festival	Best Foreign Film	Sreesha Belakvaadi	Nominated
