= Kabzaa (2023 film) =

2023 Indian film by R. Chandru

- Theatrical release poster
- Directed by: R. Chandru
- Written by: R. Chandru
- Produced by: Anand Pandit; R. Chandru; Alankar Pandian
- Starring: Upendra; Sudeepa; Shriya Saran
- Cinematography: Arjun Shetty
- Edited by: Mahesh S. Reddy
- Music by: Ravi Basrur
- Production companies: Anand Pandit Motion Pictures; Sri Siddheshwara Enterprises; Invenio Origin
- Distributed by: see below
- Release date: 17 March 2023
- Running time: 136 minutes
- Country: India
- Language: Kannada
- Budget: ₹120 crore
- Box office: ₹30–45 crore

Kabzaa (transl. Possession/Conquest) is a 2023 Indian Kannada-language period action gangster film written and directed by R. Chandru. The film stars Upendra, Sudeepa, Shriya Saran with Shiva Rajkumar in a cameo appearance. In the film, Arkeshwara, an air force officer, enters the underworld due to unavoidable circumststances and revolves around his life between 1942 and 1986.

Kabzaa was theatrically released on 17 March 2023, coinciding with the 48th birth anniversary of Puneeth Rajkumar. It received negative reviews from critics and emerged as a box-office bomb. Despite its commercial failure, a sequel titled Kabzaa 2 was announced.

== Plot ==
During the British rule in 1945, Amareshwara, a North Indian Maharaja and a freedom fighter, gets brutally killed by the British, where his wife Tulasi Devi (Sudha) and sons Arkeshwara and Sankeshwara, relocate to Amarapura and work as flag sellers. In 1971, Arkeshwara (Upendra) becomes an air force pilot, while Sankeshwara (Suneel Puranik) sacrifices his aspirations of joining the Air Force for his brother. Arkeshwara returns to Amarapura for a short holiday, where he spends time with his mother and girlfriend Princess Madhumati (Shriya Saran), who is the daughter of the head and maharaja of Amarapura, Veer Bahaddur (Murali Sharma).

Amarapura has always been involved in gang wars between three gangsters: Khaleed (M. Kamaraj), Bagheera (Nawab Shah) and Malik (John Kokken). When CM Ghanshyam Pandey (Lakki Lakshman) learns about Veer Bahaddur's plan to nominate himself as a candidate for the CM, to regain power over the people, he hires Khaleed to create chaos in Amarapura, along with his son Sartaaj (Taaha Shah). Sartaaj begins the chaos until Sankeshwara kills him for shooting an old woman. Enraged, Khaleed kills and beheads Sankeshwara, which disturbs Arkeshwara and Tulasi. An enraged Arkeshwara later kills a police officer for insulting his family, upon which he is sentenced to prison and expelled from the Air Force. Later, Khaleed hires a dreaded gangster Bali (Danish Akhtar Saifi) to kill Arkeshwara in prison, but Arkeshwara kills Bali.

Sensing an opportunity to get rid of Khaleed, Veer Bahaddur bails out Arkeshwara. Khaleed organises a hit against Arkeshwara, but Arkeshwara finishes Khaleed's men and kills Khaleed, thus seeking justice in Sankeshwara's death and marking his foray into becoming the next crime boss of the Bangalore crime syndicate. However, trouble ensues for Arkeshwara, as he has to deal with Malik and Bagheera. Veer Bahaddur wins the election and becomes the CM. Madhumati informs her decision to him on marrying Arkeshwara, but Veer Bahaddur disrespects her decision and Arkeshwara, leading her to elope with him. Arkeshwara kills Bagheera and Malik, and occupies their empire, where he becomes a dreaded gangster overnight.

In 1973, Arakeshwara leads a family life with Madhumati, their two children and Tulasi Devi, in a massive palace. On their wedding anniversary, Madhumati heads to Veer Bahaddur for reconciliation, but he holds her captive in a cell and tells her about how he used Arkeshwara as a weapon to destroy Bagheera, Khaleed and Malik. He also reveals to her that he tried to get DSP Vikram (Dev Gill) arrest Arkeshwara, but to no avail as he died at the hands of Arkeshwara. Veer Bahaddur then separates Madhumati from her sons and proceeds to burn them alive.

Meanwhile, Arkeshwara gets worried about Madhumati and their children. He calls up Veer Bahaddur to find about their whereabouts, but later gets surrounded by the ruthless cop Bhargava Bakshi (Kiccha Sudeepa), along with his battalion. Just as he is about to retaliate against them, a mysterious gangster named Siddhantha (Shiva Rajkumar) arrives with his gang and aims his weapons at both Bakshi and Arkeshwara, ordering them to be fired, thus hinting a sequel.

== Cast ==
- Upendra as Arkeshwara, a former Air Force pilot-turned-gangster
  - Chiru as young Arkeshwara
- Sudeepa as SSP Bhargav Bakshi, a ruthless cop
- Shriya Saran as Madhumati Bahaddur, Arkeshwara's wife and Veer Bahadur's daughter
- Murali Sharma as CM Veer Bahaddur, Madhumati's father and king of Amarapuram during the British Raj
- Nawab Shah as Bagheera, a coastal gangster who wears Viking attire
- Suneel Puranik as Sankeshwara, Arkeshwara's elder brother and a courageous revolutionary opposed to Khaleed
  - Jnan as Young Sankeshwara
- John Kokken as Malik, a North Indian gangster
- Kota Srinivasa Rao
- Posani Krishna Murali as North Indian king
- Sudha as Tulasi Devi, Arkeshwara and Sankeshwara's mother
- Dev Gill as DSP Vikram, a cop hired by Bahaddur to kill Arkeshwara
- M. Kamaraj as Khaleed, a bloodthirsty gangster stationed in Amarapuram
- Neenasam Ashwath as Masood, Khaleed's brother
- Danish Akhtar Saifi as Bali, a hitman who works for Khaleed
- Kabir Duhan Singh as arms dealer
- Lakki Lakshman as CM Ghanshyam Pandey, a political opponent of Bahaddur
- Pramod Shetty as SI Jambe
- Taaha Shah as Saartaj, Khaleed's son
- Avinash as jailer
- Anoop Revanna as Fayaaz, also known as Target, a vigilante don who opposes Khaleed and sides with Arkeshwara
- B Suresh as Varadharaj Mudaliar
- Prithviraj as SP
- Dharma as SP
- Tanya Hope as bar dancer in the song "Chum Chum Chali Chali"
- Shiva Rajkumar as Siddhantha (cameo appearance)

== Production ==
The film's shoot had to be suspended due to the COVID-19 pandemic; it resumed in March 2021. Actor Nawab Shah joined the shoot in October 2021, Sudeep in December 2021, while Asha Bhat joined the cast in 2022. The film marks the debut of Murali Sharma in Kannada films. The team later announced that Shiva Rajkumar had done a cameo appearance in the film.

== Music ==
Kabzaa

Soundtrack album by Ravi Basrur
- Released: 22 February 2023
- Genre: Feature Film soundtrack
- Length: 15:50
- Language: Kannada
- Label: Anand Audio
- Producer: Ravi Basrur

Ravi Basrur chronology
KGF: Chapter 2 (2022)	Kabzaa (2023)	Salaar: Part 1 – Ceasefire (2023)

Official audio
- Audio Jukebox on YouTube

The music of the film was composed by Ravi Basrur in his maiden collaboration with both Upendra and Kichcha Sudeepa. The soundtrack was released by Anand Audio. The first single, titled "Kabzaa Title Track", was released on 4 February 2023. The second single, titled "Namaami Namaami", was released on 16 February 2023. The third single, titled "Chum Chum Chali Chali", was released on 26 February 2023.

Kannada
No.	Title	Lyrics	Singer(s)	Length
1.	"Kabzaa Title Track"	Ravi Basrur	Santhosh Venky, Bhavyashri Bandimata, Ravi Basrur, Sachin Basrur, Manish Dinakar	3:59
2.	"Namaami Namaami"	Kinnal Raj	Aishwarya Rangarajan	4:38
3.	"Chum Chum Chali Chali"	Pramod Maravante	Aira Udupi, Manish Dinakar, Santhosh Venky	3:42
4.	"Radha Radha"	Ravi Basrur	Vijayalaxmi Mettinahole	3:31
Total length:				15:50

== Marketing ==
The motion poster of the film was released on the birthday of Upendra on 18 September 2021. The film's teaser was released in September 2022.

== Release ==
=== Theatrical ===
Kabzaa was released theatrically on 17 March 2023 across 4,000 screens worldwide. It was released in Kannada alongside dubbed versions of Hindi, Tamil, Telugu and Malayalam.

=== Distribution ===
The Hindi version was distributed by Anand Pandit Motion Pictures in North India while Lyca Productions acquired the theatrical rights for Tamil Nadu. Telugu rights were bagged by Sudhakar Reddy Ruchira Entertainments and N Cinemas banner. Chandru himself distributed the Kannada version. Malayalam rights were bagged by LGF Studios and distributed through E4 Entertainments in Kerala.

=== Home media ===
The satellite rights of the film were acquired by Colors Kannada, while the digital streaming rights were acquired by Amazon Prime Video in a deal reportedly valued at ₹140 crore. (US$15 million). The film premiered on Amazon Prime Video on 14 April 2023 in Kannada, along with dubbed versions in Hindi, Tamil, Telugu, and Malayalam.

== Reception ==
=== Critical reception ===
Kabzaa received mixed-to-negative reviews from critics who praised the cinematography, action sequences, and Upendra's performance, but criticized its screenwriting, music, and similarities with K.G.F.

Harish Basavarajaiah of The Times of India gave 3.5 out of 5 stars and wrote "There are many one-liners and punching dialogues which play to the gallery. Shivarajkumar’s entry in the climax brings another twist in the tale and is one of the main points in the movie. The story, visual presentation, and ensemble cast makes the movie worth watching". Bhuvanesh Chandar of The Hindu wrote "Upendra’s gangster drama is similar to ‘KGF’ in more than just the looks, flavour, and genre; it's a rip-off loaded with empty shells of everything that made Prashanth Neel's films enjoyable"

Yatamanyu Narain of News 18 gave 3 out of 5 stars and wrote "Kabzaa is the right film for you if you are craving to see an anti-hero like Rocky Bhai wreak havoc on the enemies in a full-fledged commercial set-up weaved with the help of adrenaline-pumping action sequences, edge-of-the-seat thrill, and larger than life characters. You’re bound to enjoy the twists and turns and the climax will leave you wanting for more". Vivek M V of Deccan Herald gave 2 out of 5 stars and wrote "Kabzaa' is a clueless film with little emphasis on emotional resonance. For all its showboating notwithstanding, it lacks a soul to make us care for it". Saketh Reddy Eleti of ABP Desam gave 2 out of 5 stars and wrote "Kabzaa is a poor imitation of KGF where nothing works out. Climax has absurd ending and Telugu dubbing was bad".

Haricharan Pudipeddi of Hindustan Times wrote "The film has nearly half a dozen villain characters but not even one among them manages to impress. Even on the action front, the stunts are too exaggerated to even make us root for Upendra, who sleepwalks through a role that’s interesting on paper but isn’t written in a way that it could become as popular as Yash’s Rocky from the K.G.F franchise. Both the roles – which are about a common man’s rise to the top - have so much in common but Arkeshwara feels lifeless".

=== Box office ===
The film was reported to have collected ₹11.10 crore on its opening day domestically though the makers claimed the first day worldwide gross collections to be ₹25 crore. The first weekend gross was reported to be ₹20.60 crore. The 5th day collection was reported to be ₹27.19 crore. At the end of 8 days, the collections were reported to be ₹30–₹31 crore. The film grossed ₹34.5 crore in 11 days against a budget of ₹120 crore and became a box office flop.
