= Eradane Sala =

- Music DVD Cover
- Directed by: Guruprasad
- Written by: Guruprasad
- Produced by: Yogesh Narayan
- Starring: Dhananjay; Sangeetha Bhat; Lakshmi
- Cinematography: Samrat Ashok Goutham
- Edited by: B S Kemparaju
- Music by: Anoop Seelin
- Production company: Yogesh Motion Pictures
- Release date: 3 March 2017
- Country: India
- Language: Kannada

Eradane Sala (transl. Second Time) is a 2017 Kannada-language Indian romantic comedy film written and directed by Guruprasad and produced by Yogesh Narayan. It stars Dhananjay and Sangeetha Bhat in the leading roles while Lakshmi plays an important supporting role. The soundtrack and score for the film were composed by Anoop Seelin.

The film was created in January 2014 and was in development hell for many months. Finally, it was revived in 2016, and the first trailer was released in January 2017. The film was released on 3 March 2017.

== Cast ==
- Dhananjay as Dhanu
- Sangeetha Bhat as Nandini
- Lakshmi as Dhanu's mother
- Avinash as Dhanu's father
- Padmaja Rao as Nandini's mother
- Sushmita as Bhagawati
- Kirik Keerthi as Keerthi
- Murali Shankar Shastry as Murali
- Anantha Padmanabha as Ananthu
- P. K. Srinivas Murthy as Thothu Seena
- Raghunandan S. Kunigal as Giribabu
- Bhargavi Narayan as Radha
- Guruprasad in a cameo

== Soundtrack ==
Eradane Sala

Soundtrack album by Anoop Seelin
- Released: 12 January 2017
- Recorded: 2016
- Genre: Feature film soundtrack
- Length: 11:55
- Language: Kannada
- Label: Jhankar Music

Anoop Seelin scored and sang all the songs for the film. Guruprasad wrote the lyrics. The audio was officially released on 12 January 2017. It was reported that since Guruprasad took over three years to complete the film, a rift emerged between him and the producer, Yogesh Narayan. This resulted in Guruprasad's absence during the audio launch.

Tracklist
No.	Title	Lyrics	Singer(s)	Length
1.	"Prema Kurudu"	Guruprasad	Anoop Seelin	03:14
2.	"Hoova Suridenu"	Guruprasad	Anoop Seelin	02:56
3.	"Kai Mugidorella"	Guruprasad	Anoop Seelin	02:51
4.	"Baare Magale"	Guruprasad	Anoop Seelin	02:46

== Reception ==
The Kannada film Eradane Sala, directed by Guruprasad, received a range of reactions from critics upon its release. The Hindu described it as a repetitive narrative, questioning the purpose of its "take two" approach and suggesting that it failed to offer a compelling resolution or fresh perspective. In contrast, The New Indian Express praised its romantic elements, calling it a "sizzling summer romance" that carried an emotional appeal despite its complexities. Prajavani offered a more neutral take, acknowledging the film's attempt to blend romance with Guruprasad's signature satirical style, though it noted that the execution left some viewers wanting more coherence. The Times of India gave it a moderate rating of 3 out of 5, appreciating the performances and emotional depth but criticizing its convoluted plot and lack of narrative clarity.
