= Mantram (film) =

- Directed by: S. S. Sajjan
- Produced by: Amar Choudhary
- Starring: Pallavi Raju; Shamanth Shetty
- Cinematography: Rajshekhar
- Music by: Rashid Ahmad Khan; Ravi Basrur
- Release date: 1 December 2017
- Language: Kannada

Mantram is a 2017 Indian-Kannada language horror film produced by Amar Choudhary. It is written and directed by debutant S. S. Sajjan. The film stars Shamanth Shetty and Pallavi Raju in the lead roles. The music is scored by Rashid Ahmad Khan while the background score was composed by Ravi Basrur. Jo Ni Harsha has worked as the editor and the cinematography is by Rajshekhar.

== Synopsis ==
A group of friends go to a small town to help a friend's family that is experiencing mysterious troubles. They try to figure out the source of the problem and themselves become the targets. Nobody knows what is plaguing them and all evidence points to paranormal elements.

== Cast ==
- Pallavi Raju as Radha
- Shamanth Shetty as Sanju
- Dilip
- Arpit
- Prathap
- Mithun
- Poornima
- Shashi Deshpande
- Zyra
- Anil Kumar
- Vishwanath
- Jagadish Dala
- Undadi Gunda Harish
- Sthavana
- Gaurish Akki

== Production ==
Director S.S. Sajjan had been working as an assistant and associate director for a while when he decided to take the plunge into directing his own movie. He had written many scripts but decided to make his big screen debut with Manthram. Hailing from Raichur district of Karnataka, he had always admired Daulat Mahal, a 300 year old palace in Raichur. He wanted to set his story there and felt he had only two options: to make either a horror movie or a historical movie. Being a debutante, he decided a horror movie would work best for him. After writing the script, he shot a teaser. Businessman Amar Choudhary who saw the teaser was very impressed with it and decided to produce it under his banner, Shri Aai Ji Film Productions. The film began production in 2015.

On the first day of shoot, the cast and crew experienced ghostly things like hearing someone next to them but no one would be visible.

== Soundtrack ==
Track list
No.	Title	Lyrics	Singer(s)	Length
1.	"Jai Ganesha"	S.S. Sajjan	Santhosh Venki	3:48
2.	"Jananada Samayadi - Male"	S.S. Sajjan	Santhosh Venki	4:15
3.	"Sagarada Alegalige - Bit"	S.S. Sajjan	Archana	2:21
4.	"Mantram Mantram"	S.S. Sajjan	Arasu, Chorus	3:12
5.	"Maamu Maamu"	S.S. Sajjan	Chethan, Manju, Chorus	5:04
6.	"Jananada Samayadi - Female"	S.S. Sajjan	Archana	4:17

== Reception ==
A critic from Bangalore Mirror wrote, "The story in Mantram was good and indeed great for an episode of X Files or similar serials. It has been unnecessarily stretched to nearly two hours".
