= Kamal Sridevi =

2025 Kannada-language film

- Theatrical release poster
- Directed by: V. A. Sunil Kumar
- Written by: V. A. Sunil Kumar
- Produced by: B. K. Dhanalakshmi
- Starring: Sachin Cheluvarayaswamy; Sangeetha Bhat; Akshitha Bopaiah; Kishore; Ramesh Indira
- Cinematography: Nagesh V. Acharya
- Edited by: Jnanesh B. Matad
- Music by: Keerthan K. S.
- Production companies: Swarnambika Pictures; Barn Swallow Company
- Release date: 19 September 2025 (India)
- Running time: 122 minutes
- Country: India
- Language: Kannada

Kamal Sridevi is a 2025 Indian Kannada-language drama thriller film written and directed by V. A. Sunil Kumar. Produced by B. K. Dhanalakshmi for Swarnambika Pictures, it stars Sachin Cheluvarayaswamy, Sangeetha Bhat and Akshitha Bopaiah, with Kishore and Ramesh Indira in supporting roles. The film was released on 19 September 2025.

== Plot ==
Set in Bengaluru, the film opens with the discovery of a young woman's murder in a lodge. The police investigation reveals that the victim, Devika, had been living under the alias "Sridevi." The narrative unfolds through multiple viewpoints, examining the secrets of those connected to her and reflecting on themes of identity, survival and personal choice.

== Cast ==
- Sachin Cheluvarayaswamy
- Sangeetha Bhat as Devika / Sridevi
- Akshitha Bopaiah
- Kishore
- Ramesh Indira

== Production ==
Kamal Sridevi was written and directed by V. A. Sunil Kumar. The film's cinematography was handled by Nagesh V. Acharya, editing by Jnanesh B. Matad, and music composed by Keerthan K. S. It was produced by B. K. Dhanalakshmi under the Swarnambika Pictures banner.

== Release ==
The film was released theatrically across India on 19 September 2025.

== Reception ==
The film received a mixed response from critics.

- Cinema Express called it "a relentless woman-driven suspense thriller," praising the strong female characters but pointing to uneven pacing.
- The Times of India found the multi-perspective storytelling engaging but felt the runtime and repeated flashbacks weakened the impact.
- Deccan Herald was more critical, rating it 1.5/5 and describing it as "a tiresome watch" with weak execution.
