= Kismath (2018 film) =

2018 Kannada black comedy film

- Film poster
- Directed by: Vijay Raghavendra
- Screenplay by: Vijay Raghavendra
- Story by: Alphonse Putharen
- Based on: Neram (2013)
- Produced by: Spandana Vijay
- Starring: Vijay Raghavendra; Sangeetha Bhat; Dileep Raj; Naveen Krishna
- Cinematography: Rajesh Yadav
- Edited by: Deepu S Kumar
- Music by: Rajesh Murugesan
- Production company: Spandana Shrushti
- Release date: 23 November 2018
- Country: India
- Language: Kannada

Kismath (transl. Luck) is a 2018 Indian Kannada-language black comedy film written and directed by actor Vijay Raghavendra in his first directorial project. Apart from direction, Vijay has acted and co-produced along with his wife Spandana under their home banner Spandana Srushti. The rest of the cast includes Sangeetha Bhat, Naveen Krishna, Nanda Gopal, Dileep Raj among others. Actor Saikumar makes a guest appearance.

The film is a remake of Alphonse Putharen's Malayalam-Tamil bilingual film Neram (2013). The film which began production in 2015 was finally released across Karnataka on 23 November 2018 and received mixed reviews from critics.

== Plot ==
Vijay is an engineering graduate, who works in a company and is relationship with Anu, but the company gets blacklisted and Vijay loses his job. His life is a little complicated as he borrowed a loan from a ruthless loan agent named Baddi Bhadra and is not able to repay the amount, due to low income. Anu's father Narayana Gowda denies her marriage with Vijay due to Vijay being jobless. Anu decides to elope with Vijay and his friend Vinay provides money for paying off Bhadra's loan.

Situation arises, When Anu's chain is snatched and Vijay's money is stolen. Bhadra calls Vijay and asks him to settle the money within 5PM. Narayana Gowda lodges a complaint with SI Tippeswamy against Vijay on charges of kidnapping Anu. Tippeswamy calls Vijay (whose number is provided by Narayana Gowda) and tells him that he should come along with Anu to the police station within 5PM. Vijay's brother-in-law asks some amount of money from him to start a business, which is also scheduled at 5PM. Anu is kidnapped by Bhadra's men, assuming her to be other man's girlfriend who also has borrowed money from Bhadra.

Vijay comes across the same man and decides to snatch his chain, but unfortunately at the moment, he tries to snatch the chain, the man meets with an accident and Vijay admits him to a hospital. The man's brother Lingaraju, who runs a software company named LingaSiz assures Vijay's job in the company. Tippeswamy arrives there and tells that Bhadra died in an accident. Before Bhadra's accident: Tower, who stole Anu's chain and Vijay's money, had borrowed some money from Bhadra. He plots with two others in having the money for themselves and stealing Bhadra's car. While the plan works out perfectly, Bhadra's men went behind the car, and Bhadra chases the other man. In the chase, Bhadra is hit by an auto and dies. Coincidentally, the auto driver was the driver who hit Lingaraju's brother with his vehicle.

Vijay meets the men who stole his money and fight ensues where Vijay defeats all of them. He finds his money and a chain inside the car and also finds Anu in the car's decklid (Bhadra hid her in the decklid). Vijay provides the money to his brother-in-law, and the movie ends with a happy note that Good time will follow every bad time in life

== Cast ==
- Vijay Raghavendra as Vijay
- Sangeetha Bhat as Anu
- Naveen Krishna as Vijay's brother-in-law
- Dileep Raj as Vinay
- Chikkanna as Tower
- Sundar Raj as Narayana Murthy
- Tabla Nani
- Honnavalli Krishna
- P. Sai Kumar as Lingaraju (cameo appearance)

== Soundtrack ==
Rajesh Murugesan who had composed the original film has scored the soundtrack and score for the film retaining all the tunes. A total of six songs and one theme track were composed by him. The audio is released by Think Music India company.

Track listing
No.	Title	Lyrics	Singer(s)	Length
1.	"Gaali Bandanthe"	Vijay Raghavendra	Vijay Prakash	03:00
2.	"Churuchurumuri"	Vijay Raghavendra	Puneeth Rajkumar	02:29
3.	"Preethiyallodane"	Ghouse Peer	Vijay Raghavendra	04:43
4.	"Kabbadi Kabbadi"	V. Nagendra Prasad	Hemanth Kumar	03:44
5.	"Kismath Theme"	Vijay Raghavendra	Vijay Raghavendra	02:38
6.	"Phone Booth"	Anandapriya	Rajesh Murugesan	02:39
7.	"Beethoven Resurrection"	Instrumental	Rajesh Murugesan	02:32

== Critical reception ==
The Indian Express wrote "sprinkles of joy and uncertainty blended with gallows of humour, makes it a relatable one." Times of India wrote "The film is slick and technically strong. It is stylised and visually appealing." Bangalore Mirror wrote "Kismath has a story that is deliberately complicated [..] It is a nice little screenplay which is engineered to perfection."
