= Preethi Geethi Ityaadi =

2014 Kannada film

- Directed by: Veerendra Mallanna
- Written by: Veerendra Mangsule; Yogaraj Bhat
- Produced by: Vijaykumar Mangsule
- Starring: Pawan Wadeyar; Sangeetha Bhat
- Cinematography: Bhaskar Reddy
- Edited by: Suresh S A
- Music by: Veer Samarth
- Production company: Fantasy Screens Entertainment Pvt Ltd; Yogaraj Movies
- Release date: 13 June 2014
- Country: India
- Language: Kannada

Preethi Geethi Ityaadi is a 2014 Indian Kannada-language film directed by Veerendra Mallanna, starring Pawan Wadeyar and Sangeetha Bhat in the lead roles.

== Cast ==
- Pawan Wadeyar
- Sangeetha Bhat as Nandita
- Rangayana Raghu
- Vinaya Prasad
- Nabha Natesh in a cameo appearance

== Music ==
Preethi Geethi Ityaadi

Soundtrack album by Veer Samarth
- Released: 2014
- Recorded: 2014
- Genre: Feature film soundtrack
- Length: 23:06
- Language: Kannada

Official audio
- Preethi Geethi Ityaadi - Full Album on YouTube

Track listing
| No. | Title | Singer(s) | Length |
|---|---|---|---|
| 1. | "Enella Aaguvudu" | Sonu Nigam | 4:24 |
| 2. | " Preethi Geethi" | Apoorva Sridhar | 2:55 |
| 3. | "Maatillade" | Veer Samarth | 5:41 |
| 4. | "Eledu Bitta" | Rahul Nambiar | 3:03 |
| 5. | "Enella Aaguvudu (Female)" | Apoorva Sridhar | 4:29 |
| 6. | "Tiruboki Takataka" | Tippu | 4:08 |
| Total length: | | | 23:06 |

== Reception ==
=== Critical response ===
Shyam Prasad S of the Bangalore Mirror wrote "The film promises a lot, but does not deliver. The plot may be old, but if you want to check how the new brigade of Sandalwood is shaping up, Preeti Geethi Ityadi could be the perfect stop". Deccan Chronicle scored the film at 1 out of 2 stars and says "Pavan's entry in her life gives her a glimmer of hope and falls in love. With guilt conscious pricking Pavan, he finally tells the truth to Nandini's mother. Fearing rejection, Pavan distances from Nandini. The two good numbers scored by Veer Samarth including the popular tirboki takataka are the few saving grace for the movie. Will the accidental love meets the fatal end, watch it with caution!" Sify wrote "Pavan has tried his best in acting and needs lot of improvisation especially while doing emotional scenes. Vinaya Prasad and other?s roles crafted nicely and are executed well. Yogaraj Bhat and Jayanth Kaikini's lyrics and Veer Samarth?s music are worth listening to. Over all it is a movie worth watching once if you are a movie buff!" A Shardhha of The New Indian Express wrote "This could have been a much better film with more attention to detail. Verdict: Minimal dialogues, spatial disorientation and an overdone story does not make for an unconventional film".
