= Gaurish Akki =

Indian journalist

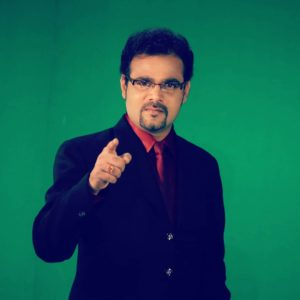
- Born: Koppal District, Karnataka, India
- Occupations: News anchor, Director of Alma Super Media School, film director, actor
- Years active: 2000–present
- Notable credit(s): TV Shows Sakhathmaathu, Premapallavi
- Website: http://www.almamediaschool.com/

Gaurish Akki is an Indian journalist, television news anchor, film director and actor. Akki hails from Koppal district, Karnataka.

== Early life and education ==
Akki was born in Mudhol, a village in Yelburga Taluk of Koppal District in Karnataka. Educated in different districts of north Karnataka like Bidar and Belgaum, he completed MA in English Literature from Karnataka University, Dharwad in 1997.

== Career ==
Akki began as a lecturer in Maharani Lakshmi Ammanni college and worked in S Nijalingappa college, Bengaluru. Akki switched to media after one year. He was passionate about media, be it big screen or small. Starting his news career with Etv Kannada news Channel in the year 2000, Akki worked for ETV news Hyderabad, in various capacities like voice over artist, copy editor, bulletin producer, and program producer.

In March 2005, he went to Bangalore and joined TV9 (Kannada). He is one of the few founding members of TV9, who worked before the inception of the channel and one of the reasons for the TV9 Kannada's success. He anchored programs of different genres like politics, social and cultural issues, and made his mark in the entertainment section. Having the credit of interviewing all the bigwigs of sandalwood, his two super hit interview series were "Sakhathmaathu " and "Premapallavi". Another notable series of those times was "Flash back"

After almost five years of in TV9, Akki joined Suvarna News 24/7 in 2010 for 3 years. Heading the cinema team for the program "Cinema Hungama", he produced and directed several programs, including the series " Out of focus". From May 2016 to June 2017 he worked for Suddi TV as chief Anchor.

Akki has received a State media Academy Award by state Government in 2007 as Best News presenter and Best Interviewer award by Cable Varthe magazine in 2008, and Vocational Excellence by Rotary in 2009

== Film career ==
Akki started his film career as a lead actor in the Kannada movie Sipayee. He wrote and directed his debut Kannada movie "Cinema My Darling" which released in March 2016 . He acted as a lead actor (in a novel based) Kannada movie called Kengulabi which was released in 2018.

== Awards ==
- 2007 – State media Academy Award by state Government in 2007 as Best News presenter
- 2008 – Best Interviewer award by Cable Varthe magazine
- 2009 – Vocational Excellence by Rotary

== Filmography ==
Year	Film	Notes
2011	I Am Sorry Mathe Banni Preethsona	
2013	Charminar	
2013	Lucia	
2014	Ulidavaru Kandanthe	
2016	Sipayee	
2016	Cinema My Darling	Debut as Director as Producer
2017	Mantram	
2018	3000	
2018	Kengulabi	
2018	Navodaya Dayzz	
