= Kurukshetra (2019 film) =

2019 film directed by Naganna

- Thearetical release Poster
- Directed by: Naganna
- Written by: J. K. Bharavi
- Produced by: Munirathna
- Starring: Darshan; Ambareesh; V. Ravichandran; Arjun Sarja; Meghana Raj; Sneha; Sonu Sood; Nikhil Kumar; Aditi Arya; Danish Akhtar Saifi
- Cinematography: Jayanan Vincent
- Edited by: Jo Ni Harsha
- Music by: V. Harikrishna
- Production companies: KCN Movies; Vrushabhadri Productions; Rockline Productions
- Distributed by: Rockline Entertainment (Kannada); Geetha Arts (Telugu); V. Creations(Tamil)
- Release date: 9 August 2019
- Running time: 185 minutes
- Country: India
- Language: Kannada
- Budget: ₹75 crore
- Box office: ₹81–90 crore

Kurukshetra (transl. Kuru's place) is a 2019 Kannada-language Mythological War film written by J. K. Bharavi and directed by Naganna. The story, centred on Duryodhana, Kaurava king, is based on the Indian epic Mahabharata, inspired by the epic poem Gadhayuddha by Ranna. The film was produced by Munirathna.

The film features an ensemble cast of Darshan, Ambareesh, V. Ravichandran, Arjun Sarja, Nikhil Kumar, Aditi Arya, Meghana Raj, Haripriya, Sneha, Sonu Sood, Danish Akhtar Saifi, P. Ravishankar and Shashikumar portraying characters from Mahabharata. The score and soundtrack were composed by V. Harikrishna, while the cinematography and editing were handled by Jayanan Vincent and Jo Ni Harsha.

The film was released on 9 August 2019 across more than 1000 screens, making it the widest release for any Kannada film alongside the dubbed Telugu version. On 15 August, the Tamil version was released. The Malayalam-language version was released on 18 October in Kerala.

Kurukshetra received mixed reviews from critics and became a commercially successful in Box office in its Original Kannada version, It was the highest-grossing Kannada film of 2019.

It was also dubbed in Hindi- language by Aditya Movies in YouTube on 26 January 2021.

== Premise ==
The story is a reinterpretation of the war described in the Mahabharata Sanskrit epic from Duryodhana's viewpoint. After losing to the Kauravas in a gamble, the Pandavas go into exile and endure hardship for a number of years. Upon their return, conflict arises over the dynastic succession leading to the Kurukshetra War.

== Cast ==
- Darshan as Duryodhana
- Arjun Sarja as Karna
- Ravichandran as Sri Krishna
- Ambareesh as Bheeshma
- Sonu Sood as Arjuna
- Danish Akhtar Saifi as Bhima
- Sneha as Draupadi
- Meghana Raj as Bhanumati
- P. Ravi Shankar as Shakuni
- Srinath as Dhritarashtra
- Srinivasa Murthy as Dronacharya
- Shashikumar as Dharmaraya
- Chandan Kumar as Nakula
- Yashas Surya as Sahadeva
- Rockline Venkatesh as Shalya
- Bharathi Vishnuvardhan as Kunti
- Nikhil Kumar as Abhimanyu
- Ravi Chethan as Dushasana
- Bharat Gowda as Ashwatthama
- Aditi Arya as Uttara
- Pavitra Lokesh as Subhadra
- Hariprriya as Maaye in a special appearance in the song "Jhumma Jhumma"
- Ramesh Bhat as Vidura
- Avinash as Gandhara Raja Subala
- Ashrita Vemuganti as Sri Krishna's wife
- Uma Hebbar as Gandhari
- Amit Tiwari as a Kaurava army warrior

== Production ==
The official launch of the film was held on 6 August 2017 with filming beginning on the same day. A major portion of the film was shot at Ramoji Film City in Hyderabad. The film was shot twice, first in 2D format and then in 3D, with shooting completed after more than 230 days. A few scenes and dialogues were reported to have been inspired by the 1977 Telugu movie Daana Veera Soora Karna.

== Soundtrack ==
Kurukshetra

Soundtrack album by V. Harikrishna
- Released: 1 August 2019
- Genre: Soundtrack
- Language: Kannada
- Label: Lahari Music
- Producer: V. Harikrishna

V. Harikrishna chronology
Yajamana (2019)	Kurukshetra (2019)	Adyaksha in America (2019)

Singles from Kurukshetra
- 1. "Saahore Saaho" Released: 5 July 2019; 2. "Chaaruthanthi" Released: 13 July 2019

External audio
- Audio Jukebox Malayalam on YouTube
- Audio Jukebox Kannada on YouTube
- Audio Jukebox Tamil on YouTube
- Audio Jukebox Telugu on YouTube

Music director V. Harikrishna was commissioned to compose the film's score. Lahari Music, which bagged the film's audio rights for ₹1.5 crore, launched the soundtrack on 7 July 2019. The first song, "Saahore Saaho", was released on 5 July 2019.

Kannada Tracklist

All lyrics are written by V. Nagendra Prasad.

No.	Title	Singer(s)	Length
1.	"Saahore Saaho"	Vijay Prakash	4:07
2.	"Chaaruthanthi"	Shreya Ghoshal, Sonu Nigam	3:23
3.	"Yelliruve Hariye"	Anuradha Bhat	3:01
4.	"Jhumma Jhumma"	Anuradha Bhat, Shweta Mohan	3:55
5.	"Uthare Uthare"	Santhosh Venky, Shreya Ghoshal
6.	"Aava Yochaneyu"	Hemanth Kumar

Hindi Tracklist

No.	Title	Length
1.	"Saahore Saaho"
4.	"Jumma Jumma"

Telugu Tracklist

All lyrics are written by Vennelakanti.

No.	Title	Singer(s)	Length
1.	"Saahore Saaho"	M. M. Keeravani	4:18
2.	"Raaga Thanthi"	Sai Charan, Harini	3:23
3.	"Hey Bharatha Vamshaja"	Mano	3:01
4.	"Jhumma Jhumma"	Chinmayi, Mano	3:55
5.	"Uthtara Uththara"	Sarath Santosh, Neha Venugopal	4:18
6.	"Kurukula Thilakalu"	Sri Vardhini	4:18

Tamil Tracklist

All lyrics are written by D. Sai Mohan Kumar.

No.	Title	Singer(s)	Length
1.	"Veerathi Veera"	Mukesh
2.	"Kaadhal Kiliye"	Sathyaprakash, Neha Venugopal
3.	"Jumma Jumma"	Chinmayi, Mano
4.	"Guru Kulathai"	Surmukhi Raman
5.	"Uyire Uyire"	Sarath Santhosh, Neha Venugopal
6.	"Hey Bharatha"	Mano

Malayalam Tracklist

All lyrics are written by Mangop Gopalakrishnan.

No.	Title	Singer(s)	Length
1.	"Aajanu Bahu"	P. Unnikrishnan	4:07
2.	"Charugandhi"	Sajin, Preetha	3:27
3.	"Engunee Hariye"	Preetha	3:57
4.	"Jumma Jumma"	Renjini Jose	4:46
5.	"Uthare Uthare"	Sajin, Kavitha	3:04
6.	"Hey Bharatha Vamshaja"	Sajin	2:13
Total length:			21:34

== Release ==
=== Home media ===
The satellite rights for the Kannada and Hindi versions of the film were bought by two different companies for ₹9 crore and ₹9.5 crore, respectively.

=== Release date allocation ===
A news report in late 2018 speculated that the film would be released in February 2019. But a delay caused the release date to be pushed to 5 April, targeting an Ugadi release. After actor Nikhil Kumar announced his participation in the 2019 Indian general elections, and the release date was further postponed as promotion of a candidate is prohibited during the elections. Producer Munirathna remarked, "The film is made in both 2D and 3D and it has got delayed due to the extensive graphics. Now, we are ready with the product and as planned, I am very keen to release this in April first week. But since Nikhil is part of our film, if I want to go ahead with the planned release date, I will have to lose out the entire Mysuru region." The film was later slated to be released on 9 August but pulled forward by a week in order to avoid a clash in screen allotment with another multi-language release Saaho. Later, it was rescheduled to 9 August to coincide with the festival of Varamahalakshmi Vrata.

The film was planned to be simultaneously released in four languages, apart from Kannada. It was released on 9 August 2019 in both 2D and 3D formats in two languages – Kannada and Telugu. On 15 August 2019, the Tamil version was released. Due to floods in Kerala, the Malayalam version was released on 18 October 2019 in Kerala.

On 5 September 2019, the film was released in the Middle East countries of United Arab Emirates, Bahrain, Oman, Kuwait, and Qatar.

== Reception ==
Kurukshetra received positive to mixed reviews from critics.

A. Sharadhaa of The New Indian Express rated the film 4/5 stars and wrote, "Narration is simple and helps even those who know nothing of the epic understand the story. It looks like the team has tediously managed to keep the story in a format that is likely to be widely accepted." A critic from The Times of India gave the film 3.5/5 stars and wrote, "While the story manages to hold the interest of the viewers through most of its run time, the screenplay basically plays to the gallery. [...] This one is for those who miss the good old mythological cinema and of course, for Darshan’s fans, who can watch their superstar playing the character of his lifetime and excelling in it."

Manoj Kumar R. of The Indian Express gave it 3/5 stars and wrote, "The first half of Kurukshetra suffers from uneven pacing. However, the second half holds well, thanks to a series of action set pieces." Aravind Shwetha of The News Minute wrote, "Darshan is the heart and soul of the film, but the dialogues and direction could have been better." Shashiprasad S. M. of Deccan Chronicle wrote, "There are quite a few epic mistakes when it comes to dialogues but it is the effort and the honest making despite the technical disappointments, Munirathna's Kurukshetra deserve applause for pulling out a decent entertainment". M. K. Raghavendra of Firstpost gave it 1/2 stars and wrote, "the biggest problem with the film is perhaps that it does not maintain the respectful distance required from its epic characters."

== Box office ==
=== Domestic ===
The film collected ₹13 crore (US$1.4 million) on its opening day. The first week collection of the film was reported to be around ₹30 crore to ₹35 crore. The film completed 100 days in few centers and emerged as a commercially successful film at the box office.
