= Jugaari =

2010 Kannada film

Jugaari (ಜುಗಾರಿ)
- Directed by: S D Aravind
- Produced by: G R Ramesh
- Starring: Avinash Diwakar; Harshika Poonacha
- Cinematography: Ananth Urs
- Edited by: Sree
- Music by: Arjun Janya
- Release date: February 26, 2010
- Country: India
- Language: Kannada

Jugaari (Kannada: ಜುಗಾರಿ) is a 2010 Kannada film directed by S. D. Arvind. The music of the film was composed by Arjun Janya.The film was produced by Ramesh G.R.

== Cast ==
- Avinash Diwakar as Shankara
- Harshika Poonacha
- Avinash
- Sharath Lohitashwa
- B. Suresha
- Girija Lokesh

== Reception ==
=== Critical response ===
BS Srivani from Deccan Herald wrote "Harshika tries mightily to chew a role that is big for her and does a creditable job. The rest - Shivaji Jadhav, Avinash and several other actors - have all done a splendid job. “Jugaari” is intelligent cinema, with little “mass” appeal". A critic from The New Indian Express wrote "Aravind’s USP is the narration of the story during the post-intermission session. The climax of this film is not only hilarious but also interesting and Suresh’s dialogues laced with North Karnataka diction give the audience a hearty laugh. Another scene, where the hero translocates a so-called social worker to a garbage dumping yard, provides comic relief".
