= Gara (film) =

2019 Indian film

- Official poster
- Directed by: KR Murali Krishna
- Screenplay by: KR Murali Krishna
- Based on: An Astrologer's Day by R. K. Narayan
- Produced by: Nagaprasad
- Starring: Rahman; Avanthika Mohan; Pradeep Aryan
- Cinematography: HC Venu
- Music by: Sagar Gururaj
- Release date: 3 May 2019
- Country: India
- Language: Kannada

Gara is a 2019 Indian Kannada-language drama film directed by Murali Krishna and starring Rahman, Avanthika Mohan and Pradeep Aryan. The story is based on R. K. Narayan's short story An Astrologer's Day.

== Cast ==
- Rahman as Gangaswamy aka Nishant
- Avanthika Mohan as Akasmika
- Pradeep Aryan as Bhageeratha
- Johnny Lever
- Sadhu Kokila
- Tabla Nani
- M. S. Umesh

== Production ==
This film marks television news anchor Rehman Hassan's film debut. Bollywood actor Johnny Lever made his Kannada debut with this film.

== Soundtrack ==
The songs were composed by Sagar and his father Gururaj. Manjula and Sangeetha Gururaj sang songs in the film.

== Reception ==
A critic from The Times of India opined that "What works for the film is it's [sic] visuals and the music. But the screen time ends up being far too long and, in hindsight, only makes the film seem like an intelligent exercise on paper". A critic from Bangalore Mirror wrote that "It may have been a good story on paper, but on screen, Gara is a haphazard plot that is far too long for its content, too slow to be engaging and poorly structured for an impact". A critic from Cinema Express stated that "The only positives in Gara are the picturesque locations, the cinematography by HC Venu, and Sagar Gururaj's music. Everything else gets a thumbs down".
