= Devaru Bekagiddare =

- Directed by: Kenja Chethan Kumar
- Written by: Kenja Chethan Kumar
- Screenplay by: Kenja Chethan Kumar
- Produced by: Horizon Movies
- Starring: S. Shivaram; Anoop P. Doddmane; Sathyanath; Prasad Vashist; Raj Prajwal
- Cinematography: Rudramuni
- Edited by: Kenja Chethan Kumar
- Music by: Juevin Singh J. M.
- Release date: 11 October 2019 (Bangalore)
- Running time: 93 Minutes
- Country: India
- Language: Kannada

Devaru Bekagiddare is a 2019 Kannada film, written and directed by Kenja Chethan Kumar.

== Plot ==
A joyous drive back home from a wedding turns into a disaster as the driver loses control and the vehicle crashes leading to the death of all the people in the vehicle except for a baby. Ranganna, a local resident of the village takes responsibility of the baby whom he names Appu. Appu is brought up by Ranganna and is left devastated on his death. Keeping in mind Ranganna's teachings and the daily incidents with him, he sets on a journey to find that particular person who can be the bridge between him and God in order to find his true parents.

== Cast ==
- S. Shivaram
- Anoop P. Doddmane
- Sathyanath
- Prasad Vashist
- Raj Prajwal

== Accolades ==
Award	Year	Category	Recipient	Result	Ref.
Chandanavana Film Critics Academy Award	8 February 2020	Best Child Actor	Master Anoop	Nominated	
