= Anukta =

- Directed by: Ashwath Samuel
- Screenplay by: Ashwath Samuel
- Story by: Karthik Attavar; Santosh Kumar Konchady
- Produced by: Harish Bangera
- Starring: Karthik Attavar; Sangeetha Bhat; Sampath Raj; Anu Prabhakar
- Cinematography: Manohar Joshi
- Edited by: Vishwa M. N.
- Music by: Nobin Paul
- Production company: Deyi Productions
- Distributed by: B. K. Gangadhar
- Release date: 1 February 2019
- Running time: 134 minutes
- Country: India
- Language: kannada

Anukta (English: Unexpressed) is a 2019 Indian Kannada-language thriller film directed by Ashwath Samuel. This movie is produced by Harish Bangera under Deyi Production. Nobin Paul has worked on music as well as background music for the film. The film stars Karthik Attavar, Sangeetha Bhat, Sampath Raj, and Anu Prabhakar.

== Synopsis ==
Anukta revolves around a crime investigation of a murder mystery. Daivakola, from Tulu Nadu, plays a part in the film.

== Cast ==
- Karthik Attavar as Karthik Kashyap
- Sangeetha Bhat as Tanvi
- Sampath Raj as Dharmaraj Shetty
- Anu Prabhakar as Anupama Shetty
- K. S. Sridhar as Rajashekhar
- Anil Ninasam
- Lakshmi Siddaiah as Veena
- Usha Bhandary as Mary
- Claudy D'Leema as David
- Ramesh Rai Kukkuvalli as Ramaiah
- Roshan Shetty as Vikram Shetty, Dharmaraj Shetty's son
- Devi Prakash as Shankar, a driver
- Deepthi Saliyan
- M. K. Mata

== Production ==
The film was shot in the Udupi and Dakshina Kannada districts.

== Soundtrack ==
No.	Title	Singer(s)	Length
1.	"Maga Baaro"	Chandan Shetty
2.	"Ee Saniha"	Vasuki Vaibhav
3.	"Minchula Saagide"	Manikya Vinayakam
4.	"Thalupisadhe Ulidhiruva"	Ashwin Sharma, Palak Muchhal

== Reception ==
Shashiprasad S.M. of the Deccan Chronicle wrote, "it is a well made mysterious thriller worth two plus hours of time".
