= Mookajjiya Kanasugalu (film) =

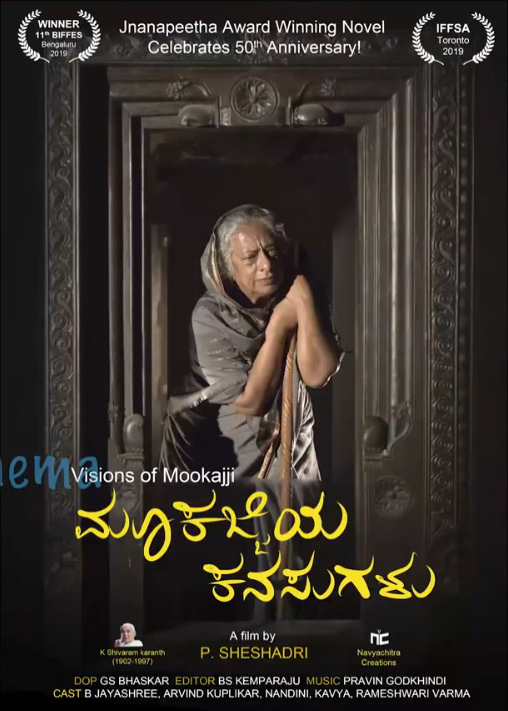
- Film Poster
- Directed by: P. Sheshadri
- Screenplay by: P. Sheshadri
- Based on: Mookajjiya Kanasugalu by K. Shivaram Karanth
- Produced by: Navyachitra Creations
- Starring: B. Jayashree; Aravind Kuplikar
- Cinematography: G.S. Bhaskar
- Edited by: B. S. Kemparaju
- Music by: Pravin Godkhindi
- Distributed by: Custard Apple Pictures
- Release date: 29 November 2019
- Running time: 132 minutes
- Country: India
- Language: Kannada

Mookajjiya Kanasugalu is a 2019 Kannada film directed by P. Sheshadri, based on the Jnanpith Award-winning novel of the same name by K. Shivaram Karanth. The film was produced by Navyachitra Creations and written by P. Sheshadri.

== Plot ==
Mookajji is an eighty-year-old woman who lives in coastal Karnataka. Mookambika, as she was named at birth, was married off as a child before she could attain puberty, but the boy she was married to died within two days of the wedding. As a result, Mookajji now lives in her maternal house with her brother's grandson, Subbaraya and his wife Seetha who have two children. Subbaraya discovers that Mookajji has the power of extrasensory perception. She can touch any object or talk to a person and see the history behind that object or person.

One day Subbaraya brings a small wicker basket to Mookajji so that she can store her betel nuts in it. Upon touching it, she sees a vision of the history of that basket. She begins to narrate the story of Ramanna and Nagi.

Ramanna and Naagi

Naagi makes a wicker basket as a sign of affection for her husband Rammana who rejects it. He mistreats Naagi regularly and denies her affectionate advances which saddens her. Naagi is noticed by a rich merchant in the village named Sheenappa who begins to lust after her. He visits her home when Ramanna is absent and propositions her to come to his house. Naagi is reluctant. Refusing to give up, Sheenappa arranges for Ramanna to leave the village for a few days by giving him errands to run in other places. Naagi reluctantly goes to Sheenappa's house where they make love. Naagi and Sheenapa continue their affair. Ramanna notices this one day and leaves her.

Sheenappa and Naagi soon have a child together. But Naagi notices Sheenappa having an affair with another woman and confronts him. He throws her out of the house along with their infant daughter. Naagi is then forced to make wicker baskets for a living to support herself and her child. Ramanna goes to Naagi to take her back but Naagi refuses saying that she is a defiled woman and cannot return to him.

Mookajji finishes narrating the story of Ramanna and Naagi to Subbaraya.

She then talks to Ramanna, who is now forty years old, and tells him that it was not just Naagi's fault for having the affair and that he was equally to blame for not fulfilling her desires which drove her to have the affair in the first place.

A few days later, Seetha sees Naagi and her daughter who are thirsty and invites them to her house to offer them some refreshments. Naagi realises that Mookajji lives there too. When she reaches there, she talks to Mookajji about her plight. Mookajji sends her granddaughter on an errand to deliver a bag to a house and asks Naagi to go as an escort since the house is near a forest. Upon reaching the house, Naagi realises it is Ramanna, her first husband's home. Mookajji's granddaughter goes to the house and gives the bag to Ramanna who opens it and sees that the bag contains the wicker basket Naagi had made for him. He sees Naagi crying in the distance. He runs to her and they hug each other.

Subbaraya continues to bring various artefacts such as old bones and tools he found in a cave. Mookajji tells him the stories behind those objects. They hold discussions about sexuality, nature and other topics.

Thippi

Later, when Subbaraya plans to visit Hindgana, a neighbouring village, Mookajji asks him to visit her childhood friend Thippi and enquire about her. Subbaraya visits Thippi and they have a conversation where Thippi tells him the story of Mookajji.

The film flashes back to the past. Thippi is also widowed when she turns twenty. Mookambika gets angry with the village deity and blames the Goddess for their misfortune. This leads to people labelling Mookambika as crazy and avoiding her. In due course, she comes to terms with her relationship to the Goddess, but when she is at the temple one day, she is rudely told to leave by the temple priest. She leaves with a smile.

The film returns to the present. Thippi tells Subbaraya that Mookajji underwent a drastic change that day and stopped talking, except for occasional rants about people accusing them of wrongdoings which would later turn out to be true. Her silence had earned her the name of "Mookajji" (translation from Kannada: Mooka = Mute; Ajji = Grandmother).

Subbaraya continues to bring her artefacts for her to discern its history.

One day, Mookajji asks Subbaraya to help take her to the neighbouring village where Thippi resides. They travel to Hindgana where Mookajji and Thippi have an emotional reunion.

A few days later, Mookajji asks Subbaraya to escort her to Hindgana to see Thippi right away. Although hesitant at first, Subbaraya agrees to after his wife insists that he make Mookajji as a priority. They go to Hindgana where they see Thippi bedridden. Thippi has not eaten in two days and is about to breathe her last. Mookajji pacifies Thippi and puts her at ease while Thippi passes away. She then asks Subbaraya to arrange for the final rites.

Anant Rao

Mookajji confronts her grandson's friend who has come on a visit to their village. He is a teacher and lives under the pretence of being spiritually inclined, and avoids marriage saying that it will interfere in his life of spiritualism. However, he secretly continues to have a homosexual relationship with a student. When Mookajji questions him about his refusal to be married, he cites his spiritual life as reason for it. Mookajji indicates to him that she is aware of his homosexuality and that he should give up his façade of being into spirituality and accept himself. This shakes him up.

Subbaraya gets a dream one night where he sees Mookajji telling him to throw away a gold chain that he had shown to Mookajji.

== Cast ==
- B. Jayashree as Mookajji / Mookambika
  - Kaavya Sha as young Mookambika
- Aravind Kuplikar as Subbaraya
- Nandini Vittal as Sita
- Rameshwari Varma as Thippajji
- Pragathi Prabhu as Naagi
- Prabhudeva as Ramanna
- Baby Shlagha Saligrama as Chandra
- Pradeep Chandra as Sheenappa
- Siddarth Madhyamika as Anant Rao

== Production ==
Moojajjiya Kanasugalu began its shoot in coastal Karnataka on 10 October 2018, to coincide with 116th birth anniversary of Karanth.

== Accolades ==
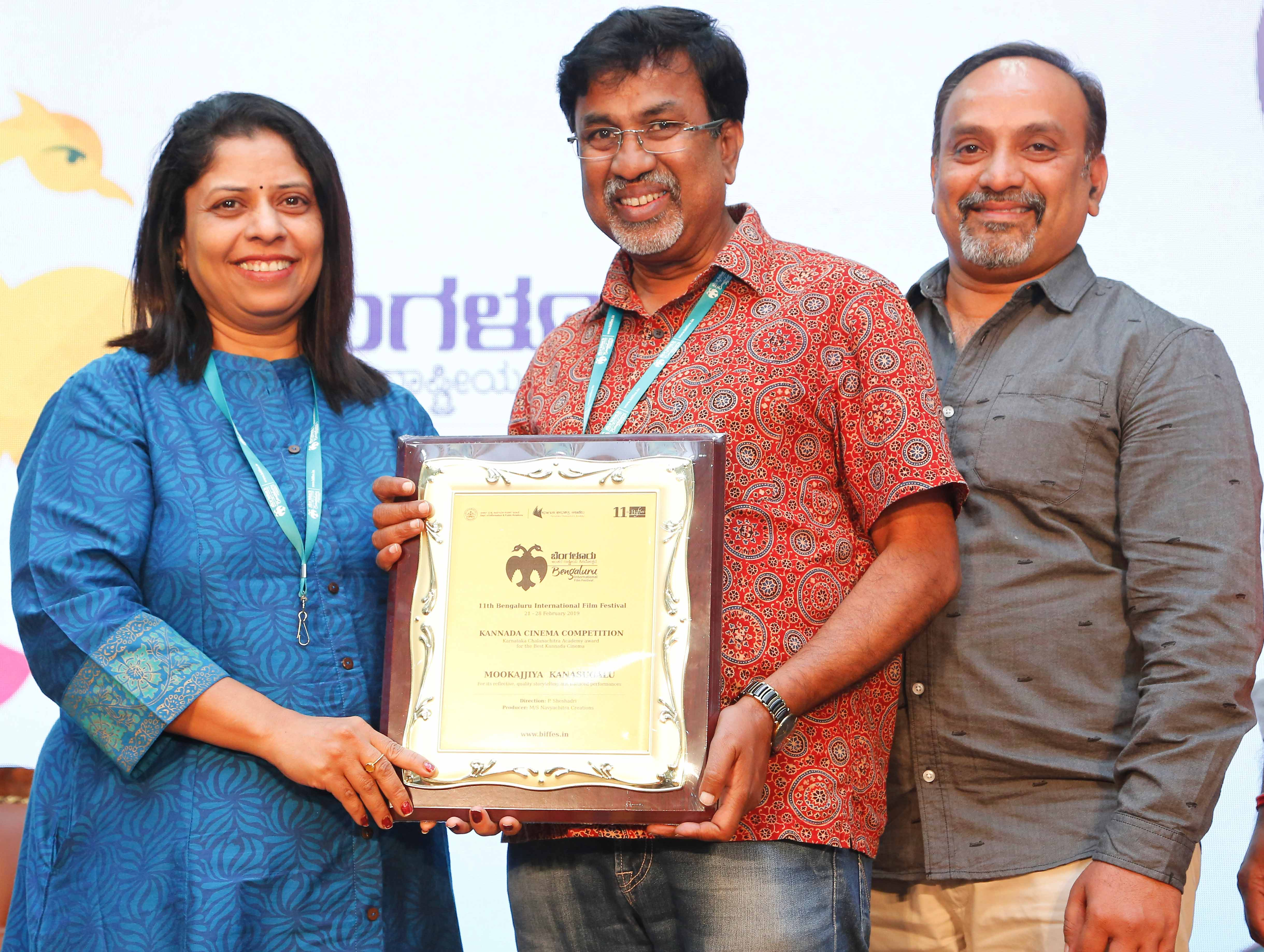
P. Sheshadri, Anupama Sheshadri and B. S. Kemparaju with the First Prize Award in the Kannada Cinema Competition at Bangalore International Film Festival

- Mookajjiya Kanasugalu received the first prize in the Kannada Cinema Competition at the 11th Bengaluru International Film Festival in February 2019.
- Sheshadri won Karnataka State Film Award for Best Screenplay 2018.
- B. Jayashree received Critics Choice Awards 2020 Best Actress - Kannada
