= Ratnamanjarii =

- Directed by: Prasiddh
- Produced by: S Sandeep Kumar; Nataraj Halebeedu; Dr. Naveen Krishna
- Starring: Raj Charan, Akhila Prakash
- Cinematography: Preetham Tegginamane
- Edited by: Pavan Ramisetty
- Music by: Harshavardhan Raj
- Production companies: Sharavathi Filmss; SNS Cinemaas; Aryan Motion Pictures
- Distributed by: Deepak
- Release date: May 17, 2019
- Country: India
- Language: Kannada

Ratnamanjarii is a 2019 Indian Kannada action thriller film written and directed by debutant Prasiddh. First, of its kind, the movie is produced by NRI Kannadigas: S Sandeep Kumar (Sharavathi Films), Nataraj Halebeedu (SNS Cinemaas) and Dr. Naveen Krishna (Aryan Motion Pictures). Harshavardhan Raj is scoring and composing music for the movie. Preetham Tegginamane is the DOP, and Pavan Ramisetty is the editor. The feature film stars Raj Charan, Akhila Prakash, Pallavi Raju and Shraddha in lead roles. Ratnamanjarii's storyline is inspired by and based on true events which took place in the USA in 2008 and revolves around a real-life murder incident of Kannadiga elderly couple in the US.

== Cast ==
- Raj Charan as Siddhanth
- Akhila Prakash as Gowri
- Pallavi Raju as Kamali
- Shraddha as Kannika
- Suresha C Bhat as Pandit Nanayya (USA)
- Pushpa Krishna as Mrs. Nanayya (USA)
- Jai Mohan as Surya
- Raju Vaividhya as Tatkaal
- Karthik Chander (USA)
- Divya Shetty Shridhar
- Ramesh Pattar (USA) as Tejas

== Plot ==
Siddhant, an NRI botanist living in the United States, marries Gowri and moves into a large bungalow rumored to be haunted. Soon after, Siddhant begins experiencing recurring nightmares and unexplained events. They befriend their elderly neighbors, Pandit Naniah and his wife, whose sudden murder shocks the authorities and remains unsolved.

Disturbed by visions and clues connected to the couple, Siddhant travels to Coorg to investigate further. There, he encounters the isolated Ratnamanjari estate and learns of local rituals and legends tied to the region. As he probes deeper, he discovers links between his dreams, the estate, and the murdered couple.

The investigation reveals the estate’s past: Ganapati, the adopted son of its former owners and a devoted environmentalist, became its caretaker after their deaths. With Kannika’s help, he staged the estate as haunted to prevent deforestation and the forced sale of the land. Disguised as Somanna, Ganapati murdered the Naniah couple in the US after they refused to give up their claim over the property.

Siddhant confronts Ganapati in Coorg, leading to Ganapati’s accidental death, while Kannika later dies by suicide. With the mystery resolved, Siddhant and Gowri return to the United States and resume their lives peacefully.

== Production ==
Ratnamanjarii is shot around different locations in the US and Karnataka. The film's first song, Mina Mina, was released at AKKA Sammelana 2018 by Puneeth Rajkumar(also the singer). The fashion lyric song sung by Sanjith Hegde was released by Dr. Shivrajkumar. The film team has completed the shooting process, and audio of the movie is planned in the month of March.

== Soundtrack ==
Ratnamanjarii

Soundtrack album by Harshavardhanraj
- Genre: Feature film soundtrack
- Language: Kannada
- Label: Anand Audio
- Producer: Harshavardhanraj

The film's score and the soundtrack are composed by Harshavardhan Raj. The music rights are acquired by Anand Audio.

Tracklist
| No. | Title | Lyrics | Singer(s) | Length |
|---|---|---|---|---|
| 1. | "Mina Mina" | K. Kalyan | Puneeth Rajkumar | 04:37 |
| 2. | "Beeso Ghali" | Vijay Eshwar | Sanjith Hegde | 04:11 |
| 3. | "Omme Nannavalu" | | Tippu, Supriya Lohith | 4:21 |
