= Loudspeaker (2018 film) =

- Theatrical release poster
- Directed by: Shiva Tejass
- Produced by: Dr Raju K.
- Starring: Abhishek Jain; Anusha Rodrigues; Kaavya Sha; Sumanth Bhat; Bhaskar Ninasam
- Edited by: KM Prakash
- Music by: Songs: Harshavardhan Raj; Score: Suddho Roy
- Production company: Raj Production
- Release date: 10 August 2018
- Country: India
- Language: Kannada

Loudspeaker is a 2018 Indian Kannada-language comedy drama film directed by Shiva Tejass and starring Abhishek Jain, Anusha Rodrigues, Kaavya Sha, Sumanth Bhat and Bhaskar Ninasam. The film is an unofficial remake of the Italian film Perfect Strangers (2016). The film was released to predominantly positive reviews for its non-mainstream content.

== Cast ==
- Abhishek Jain
- Anusha Rodrigues
- Kaavya Sha as Kavya
- Sumanth Bhat
- Bhaskar Ninasam
- Karthik Rao
- Vijay Eshwar
- Rangayana Raghu
- Prakash Thuminad
- Dattanna

== Soundtrack ==
The music for the film was composed by Harshavardhan Raj.

- "Chaddi Olage" - Chandan Shetty (lyrics by Abhishek Jain)

== Reception ==
A critic from The Times of India rated the film 3/5 stars and wrote that "this film does seem to offer a novel experience in terms of story and intent, which is different from the run-of-the-mill commercial dramas. You could give this a watch" A critic from The New Indian Express wrote, "Shiva Tejas drives the film with the tech tool, at the same time giving it a realistic touch. The director, without getting preachy, actually throws light on how social media has changed the nature of human networking". A critic from Bangalore Mirror rated the film 3/5 stars and wrote, "Director Shiva Tejas has managed an engaging narration without a dull moment. Considering that most of the film takes place in a single location and the narrative itself is dialogue-heavy, Loudspeaker could have stumbled into boring territory with a single bad scene".

On the contrary, a critic from The News Minute wrote, "Loudspeaker is a movie I want to forget as soon as possible".
