= Prakash Thuminad =

Indian actor

- Occupation: Actor
- Years active: 2017-present

Prakash Thuminad is an Indian film actor who works in Kannada cinema. He is best known for his role in the film Sarkari Hi. Pra. Shaale, Kasaragodu, Koduge: Ramanna Rai (2018).

== Career ==
Thuminad is associated with the Kannada film, Ondu Motteya Kathe (2017), a romantic drama directed by Raj B. Shetty. In 2018, he appeared alongside Diganth and Pooja Devariya, in Senna Hegde's Kannada drama Katheyondu Shuruvagide. His performance in Sarkari Hi. Pra. Shaale, Kasaragodu, Koduge: Ramanna Rai was highly praised, that same year. His 2019 release included Lungi. He played the role of a bank manager in Kshamisi Nimma Khaatheyalli Hanavilla, starring Diganth and Aindrita Ray.

== Filmography ==
- All films are in Kannada, unless otherwise noted.

Year	Film	Role	Notes	Ref.
2017	Ondu Motteya Kathe	Srinivas		
2018	Katheyondu Shuruvagide	Kutty		
2018	Loudspeaker			
2018	Sarkari Hi. Pra. Shaale, Kasaragodu, Koduge: Ramanna Rai	Bhujanga	SIIMA Award for Best Comedian	
2019	Yaana	Driver		
2019	Lungi			
2019	Avane Srimannarayana	Drama Company artist		
2020	2 Ekre	Nara alias Narayana	Tulu film	
2021	Yuvarathnaa			
2021	Bhajarangi 2	Alamelamma's husband		
2022	Kshamisi Nimma Khaatheyalli Hanavilla	Bank Manager		
2022	Gaalipata 2	Ramanna		
2022	Kantara	Raampa	Chittara Star Best-Comedian Award 2023	
2022	Dharani Mandala Madhyadolage	Marayade Ramanna		
2022	Thimayya & Thimayya	Jagganna		
2023	Abhiramachandra			
2023	Mithya	Surya		
2024	Bachelor Party	Prakash Anna		
2024	Ekam	Mr. Kirikiri	Anthology television series; episode "Haaraata"	
2024	Maryade Prashne	Sundar		
2024	Bagheera	Govinda		
2025	Forest			
2025	Su From So	Chandra		
2025	Rippan Swamy			
2025	Kantara: Chapter 1	Chenna & Ramappa		
2026	Common Man			
2026	Lo Naveena			
2026	Maarnami			
2026	Calendar			
2026	Lo Naveena			
2026	Alexander			
