= Fortuner (film) =

- Film poster
- Directed by: Manjunath J Anivaarya
- Written by: Pavan Ranadheera
- Story by: Pavan Ranadheera
- Starring: Diganth; Sonu Gowda
- Cinematography: Madhusudhan Maddy
- Edited by: Guruswamy T
- Music by: Poornachandra Tejaswi
- Production company: Golecha Films International
- Release date: 4 January 2019
- Country: India
- Language: Kannada

Fortuner (transl. Luck or Privilege) is a 2019 Indian Kannada-language romantic-family drama directed by Manjunath J Anivaarya in his directorial debut. The film is first venture by Golecha Films International helmed by Rajesh Golecha, Anand Golecha, Surendar Golecha and Vimal Golecha. Diganth, Sonu Gowda and Swathi Sharma are playing lead roles supported by Rajesh Nataranaga, Kalyani Raju, Vinayak Joshi, Naveen Krishna among many others.

== Plot ==
Fortune translates to Luck or Privilege. Life is said to be meaningful only when we analyse, punish and omit our imperfections before it is pointed out by others. This transition in life forms the crux of the story. The romantic drama unfolds life's situations and the protagonist's adaptation to the scenario.

== Cast ==
- Diganth as Partha
- Sonu Gowda as Anusha (Anu)
- Ratan Ram as Guruswamy (Swamy)
- Swathi Sharma as Sruthi
- Rajesh Nataranga as Prahallada
- Vinayak Joshi
- Naveen Krishna
- Kalyani Raju
- Bala Rajwadi as Sitting MLA and Partha's father
- M. S. NarasimhaMurthy
- Pallavi Raju

== Soundtrack ==
Fortuner

Soundtrack album by Poornachandra Tejaswi
- Genre: Feature film soundtrack
- Language: Kannada
- Label: Jhankar Music

The film's score and soundtrack was composed by Poornachandra Tejaswi.

Tracklist
No.	Title	Lyrics	Singer(s)	Length
1.	"O Deva"	Pavan Ranadheera	Sanjith Hegde, Varun	04:21
2.	"Suggi Madona"	Shishunala Sharifa	Poornachandra Tejaswi, Sachin	03:41
3.	"Sirigereya Neeralli"	K N Narasimha Swamy	Sanjith Hegde	04:48
4.	"Kaiya Chivuti Omme"	Hemanth Kumar	Shreya Ghoshal
5.	"Thanuvina Dhigbhandana"	Rakshith M Nagarle	Poornachandra Tejaswi
6.	"Kadala Dadadamele"	Hemanth Kumar	Ananya Bhat

== Reception ==
=== Critical response ===
Vinay Lokesh of The Times of India scored the film at 3.5 out of 5 stars and says "Fortuner highlights the complexities in today's relationships and how the young generation reacts when their expectations fall short. Director J Anivaarya deserves credit for adopting a refreshing approach that strikes the right chord. Fortuner takes you on an emotional journey that doesn't have the regular tropes of commercial films" A Shardhha of Cinema Express scored the film at 2.5 out of 5 stars and says "Fortuner leaves us with a strong sense of déja-vu, and had there been better sync between the cast and crew, the result could have been a better picture." Arvind Shweta of The News Minute wrote "The film may have worked well if it was made a decade ago. But right now, it is difficult to convince the audience with such a weak script."
