= Kapata Nataka Paatradhaari =

Indian Kannada-language suspense horror drama film

- Official poster
- Directed by: Krish
- Starring: Balu Nagendra; Sangeetha Bhat
- Music by: Adil Nadaf
- Release date: 8 November 2019
- Country: India
- Language: Kannada

Kapata Nataka Paatradhaari is a 2019 Indian Kannada-language suspense horror drama film directed by newcomer Krish and starring Balu Nagendra and Sangeetha Bhat.

== Cast ==
- Balu Nagendra as Krishna
- Sangeetha Bhat as Rukmini
- Kari Subbu

== Soundtrack ==
The music for the film was composed by Adil Nadaf.

Track listing
No.	Title	Lyrics	Singer(s)	Length
1.	"Yaake Anta Gottilla Kanree"	Venu Hasrali	Haricharan
2.	"Neenene Neenene"	Krish	Siddhartha Belmannu, Madhuri Sheshadhri
3.	"Hasida Shikanu"	Chanukya	Eesha Suchi
4.	"Manadaalada Maatu Kelu Nee"	Aniruddha Sastry	Aniruddha Sastry
5.	"Bit Hode Nee Doora"	Krish	Aniruddha Sastry
6.	"Yaake Anta Gottaytu Kanri"	Krish	Pavan Partha
Total length:				21:39

== Reception ==
Sunayana Suresh of The Times of India opined that "Balu Nagendra and Sangeetha Bhat star in this film that is an interesting concoction of drama, comedy, horror as well as a bit of the supernatural". Shashiprasad S. M. of Deccan Chronicle said that "Anyone seeking for a real good horror/suspense thriller, do watch this haunted auto rickshaw by Krish, for an assured spooky and entertaining ride". A. Sharadhaa of The New Indian Express wrote that "A haunted auto-rickshaw sounds strange as the focal point of a movie, but this is how director Krish draws the audience to his unconventional flick". Shyam Prasad S. of Bangalore Mirror stated that "With a bare minimum of characters, the plot manages to the audience hooked".
