= Pallavi Raju =

- Born: Bangalore, Karnataka, India
- Occupation: Actor

Pallavi Raju is an Indian actress, working in the Kannada films.

== Early life and education ==
Pallavi Raju was born in Bangalore, Karnataka, India. She did her schooling from Bangalore and completed her graduation from Bangalore University. She was a sports person in school and college, a state level runner and high jump player. She joined theatre called Misfit and completed acting course.

== Career ==
Pallavi Raju made her acting debut with the Kannada film "KA", she played a nurse, from a Muslim family. Second, Mantram she played a character of a school teacher who will be possessed by a ghost who was her student.

In 2019 she appeared in Ravi History. In the same year she played a pivotal role in a Kannada film Ratnamanjarii.

== Filmography ==
`Key
†	Denotes films that have not yet been released

Year	Film	Role	Notes
2014	KA	Simran	
2017	Mantram	Radha	
2018	Gultoo	Manasa	
2019	Ravi History	S. I. Anitha	
2019	Ratnamanjarii	Kamali	
2019	Fortuner	Pallavi	
