= Lungi (film) =

2019 Indian Kannada romantic film by Arjun Lewis

- Directed by: Arjun Lewis; Akshith Shetty
- Produced by: Mukesh Hegde
- Starring: Pranav Hegde; Ahalya Suresh; Radhika Rao
- Cinematography: Rijo P. John
- Music by: Prasad K. Shetty
- Production company: Khara Entertainment Banner
- Release date: 11 October 2019
- Country: India
- Language: Kannada

Lungi is a 2019 Indian Kannada romantic love story directed by Arjun Lewis and Akshith Shetty. The film has been bankrolled by Mukesh Hegde under the Khara Entertainment banner. The film stars newbie Pranav Hegde opposite Ahalya Suresh and Radhika Rao, while Prakash Thuminadu, Vj Vineeth, Karthik Varadaraju, Deepak Rai Panaji, and Roopa Vorkady appear in supporting roles.

This film also marks the foray of popular Tulu film producer Mukesh Hegde to Sandalwood. Mukesh has earlier produced Tulu films such as Barsa and Are Marler. While Rijo P John has worked as the cinematographer for his movie, Prasad K Shetty has composed the music for Lungi.

Lungi follows the life of Rakshit as he achieves all his dreams and finds the love of his life through the Lungi.

== Plot ==
The movie is all about Rakshit's journey, how he finds the purpose of his life and love through the Lungi. Rakshit is your quintessential boy next door who wants what everyone wants, to be happy and to make his parents happy. In an unexpected turn, the father of the love of his life inspires him and helps him find a way to achieve all his dreams.

== Cast ==
- Pranav Hegde as Rakshith Shetty
- Ahalya Suresh
- Radhika Rao
- Prakash Thuminad
- Vj Vineeth
- Karthik Varadaraju
- Deepak Rai Panaje
- Roopa Vorkady

== Soundtrack ==
No.	Title	Lyrics	Singer(s)	Length
1.	"Nagabeda Ande Naanu"	Arjun Lewis	Armaan Malik, Swetha Mohan	05:04
2.	"Waste Body"	Arjun Lewis	Sanjith Hegde	04:15

== Release ==
The film was released on 11 October 2019.
