= Danish Akhtar Saifi =

Indian wrestler and actor

- Born: Siwan, Bihar
- Occupations: Actor, wrestler
- Years active: 2015–present
- Spouse: Nadia Sheikh (m. 2018)

Danish Akhtar Saifi is an Indian wrestler-turned-actor who works in Hindi television and Kannada films. He is best known for playing the role of Hanuman in the television series Siya Ke Ram. He made his film debut in the 2019 Hindu (Sanatan) History Kannada film Kurukshetra (based on the Mahabharata) in the character of Bhima. He also appeared in the 2021 Kannada action film Kotigobba 3.

== Filmography ==
Key
†	Denotes films that have not yet been released

=== Film ===
Year	Film	Role	Language	Notes
2019	Kurukshetra	Bhima	Kannada	
2021	Kotigobba 3	Basheer Bhai	Kannada	
2022	Kabzaa	Bali	Kannada	
2023	Kaatera		Kannada	

== Television ==
Year	Serial	Role	Language	Notes
2016	Siya Ke Ram	Hanuman	Hindi	
2019	Paramavatar Shri Krishna	Bhima	Hindi	
2019	Shrimad Bhagwat Mahapuran	Hanuman	Hindi	
2021–2022	Baal Shiv – Mahadev Ki Andekhi Gatha	Nandi	Hindi	
2023–2024	Karmadhikari Shanidev	Hanuman	Hindi	
2025	Kaakabhushundi Ramayan Ansuni Kathaayen	Hanuman	Hindi	
2025	Gatha Shiv Parivaar Ki — Ganesh Kartikey	Nandi	Hindi	

== Theatre ==
In 2024, Danish Akhtar played the role of Lord Hanuman in the stage production Humare Ram. The production is produced by Rahul Bhuchar under the banner of Felicity Theatre and directed by Gaurav Bhardwaj, the play has been staged at venues including the Dubai Opera. In 2026, the production is scheduled for an international tour, including performances at the Eventim Apollo, London.
