= Sangeetha Bhat =

Indian actress (b. 1992)

- Other name: Sangeetha
- Occupations: Model, actress
- Years active: 2009-present
- Spouse: Sudarshan Rangaprasad

Sangeetha Bhat is an Indian actress. She predominantly appears in Kannada films and has also acted in Tamil and Telugu films.

== Career ==
Before taking on movie roles, Bhat appeared on television series with Panjaradha Gili (Kasturi channel Kannada), Bhagyavantharu (Suvarna channel Kannada), Chandrachakori (Udaya TV Kannada), Neeli (Suvarna channel Kannada), and Chandramukhi (Kasturi channel Kannada). Also, a reality TV show Life Super Guru (Zee Kannada channel), BCL (Suvarna Plus). She began her film career in Preethi Geethi Ityaadi in 2014, where she was given the lead role alongside Pawan Wadeyar. Since then, she appeared in Doo, Kaaki / Ka Ka Ka a Telugu/Tamil bilingual, and Maamu Tea Angadi, Bhat was featured in the Tamil movie titled Aarambamae Attagasam, but in 2017 more successful films such as Eradane Sala and Dayavittu Gamanisu came her way. Eradane Sala was appreciated by her fans because of her uncharacteristically bold performance. In Dayavittu Gamanisi, she starred with Vasishta N. Simha, portraying a teacher. The movie was critically acclaimed and nominated for SIIMA.

She played the lead role in the movie Kismath, along with Vijay Raghavendra, Anukta, directed and produced by a talented Mangalorean team was also a critically acclaimed film. Her upcoming movies are Alidu Ulidavaru and Kapata Nataka Paathradhari (2018-2019-2020). Sangeetha Bhat is known for her expressions and natural acting that connects to people and also known to be the critically acclaimed actress in the Kannada film industry. The actress also produced and acted in the short movie named Conversation from her own production house "Scrabble Productions", along with her husband Sudarshan Rangaprasad.

== Filmography ==
- All films are in Kannada, unless otherwise noted.

Key
†	Denotes films that have not yet been released

=== Films ===
Year	Title	Role	Notes
2011	Doo	Anu	Tamil film
2014	Preethi Geethi Ityaadi		Kannada film
2015	Mamu Tea Angadi		Kannada
2015	Kaki: Sound of Warning	Ghost	Telugu film
2017	Aarambamae Attagasam	Sangeetha	Tamil film
2017	Eradane Sala	Nandini	Kannada
2017	Ka Ka Ka: Aabathin Arikuri	Ghost	Tamil film
2017	Dayavittu Gamanisi		Kannada
2018	Kismat		Kannada
2019	Anuktha	Tanvi	Kannada
2019	Alidu Ulidavaru		Kannada
2020	Kapata Nataka Paatradhaari		Kannada
2020	Aadyaa		Kannada
2024	Klaantha		Kannada
2025	Kamal Sridevi	Sridevi	Kannada

=== Television ===
- Chandra Chakori
- Bhagyavantharu
- Neeli
- Chandramukhi
- Life Super Guru
- Yediyur Shree Siddhalingeshwara

=== Short movies ===
- "Conversation" (2018)

== Controversy ==
On 14 October 2018, through a three-page revelation, she kick-started the #MeToo movement in the Kannada film industry. Various celebrities came out in support, which led to further revelations.
