= Mookajjiya Kanasugalu (novel) =

1968 novel by K. Shivaram Karanth

Mookajjiya Kanasugalu (Dreams of Mookajji)
- Author: K. Shivaram Karanth
- Language: Kannada
- Genre: Novel
- Publisher: S.B.S Publishers Distributors (Kannada)
- Publication date: 1968
- Publication place: India
- Pages: 272
- Awards: Jnanpith Award (1977)
- ISBN: 9788172850623

Mookajjiya Kanasugalu (transl. Dreams of Mookajji) is a 1968 Kannada epic novel written by K. Shivaram Karanth. It won the Jnanpith Award in the year 1977. The novel is about the thoughts of human being of today's generation. It deals with the beliefs, the origin of tradition etc.

The name of the novel itself is interesting as when translated, it says "Dreams of Silent Granny". Although the author does not want to mention any of the character as lead characters, its Granny and her grandson who are two main lead characters of this novel. Grandson represents every human being who has doubts about the origin of superstitious beliefs and tradition. Grandma in this novel has got a strength of seeing the things which are going to happen and which are happened before in the form of dreams. Mookajji represents our beliefs in this book. She tries to reveal our true beliefs.

== Plot summary ==
Set in village called "Mooduru", the novel revolves around two main characters: Mookajji and her grandson Subbraya. Subbraya represents the doubts raised in human beings about the god and other traditions. Mookajji is a widow aged about 80, who lost her husband at the age of ten years. The character of grandmother in this book has got some supernatural powers of telling the truth about the things that are going to happen and those which are happened already. Though other characters are present, the author used them (Mookajji and her grandson) effectively to convey his theme.

== Background ==
Subbraya always loves to listen to the stories told by his grandmother, instead of reading novels which fails in portraying reality. He feels that the stories told by his grandmother are much more interesting than those novels. He takes every matter to his Grandmother to know reality of them and he feels that Mookajji's answer appealing and real. Although incidents happen in a village, the author makes Subbraya to ask questions regarding god, culture, belief, evolution and other social issues.

== Translations ==
The novel has been translated in many languages such as English, Tamil, Telugu, Hindi, Oriya and Malayalam.

In Malayalam, the story is known by the name Mookambikayude Swapnangal.

== Movie ==
Mookajjiya Kanasugalu is made into a film in Kannada language with the same name as title of the movie.

== Awards ==
The novel received the Jnanpith Award in 1977.
