= S.D. Aravinda =

Indian film director

- Other name: Arvinda
- Occupations: Film director, Music Director
- Years active: 1997–present

S D Arvinda is a film director and music composer from the Kannada film industry in India. He debuted as a film director with Jugari in 2010. Jugari was listed among the top 10 movies of 2010, according to a report by weekly magazine Sudha.

A Masters of Science in Mass Communication, Arvinda made his entry into the visual media through television soon after completing college in 1998. Being the grandson of the legendary Kannada comedian Narasimharaju, Arvind started off with a programme on his grandfather, working along with his aunt, which was aired on Doordarshan, titled Haasya Chakravarhi. He made his documentary debut with Avalokana, a cultural video magazine, produced by the Information and Publicity Department, Govt. of Karnataka. He directed and composed music for his 2016 horror thriller Last Bus.

== Filmography ==
Year	Film					
Year	Film	Director	Producer	Music Director	Lyricist	Notes
2010	Jugaari	Yes				
2016	LastBus	Yes	Yes	Yes		
2017	Ditta Hejje			Yes		
2017	MOJO			Yes		
2018	Mataash	Yes		Yes	Yes	
