= An Astrologer's Day =

- Short story by R. K. Narayan
- Language: English
- Genres: Thriller, short story, suspense

Publication
- Published in: India
- Publisher: Indian Thought Publications
- Publication date: 1947
- Publication place: India
- Media type: Print

An Astrologer's Day is a thriller, suspense short story by author R. K. Narayan. While it had been published earlier, it was the titular story of Narayan's fourth collection of short stories published in 1947 by Indian Thought Publications. It was the first chapter of the collection of stories Malgudi Days which was later telecasted on television in 2006.

Fallon et al. described the work as "a model of economy without leaving out the relevant detail." Themes found in An Astrologer's Day recur frequently throughout Narayan's work. The story was adapted into a 2019 Kannada movie Gara.

== Publications ==
- Indian Thought Publications (1947)
- National Publishing House (2010)
- Frank Bros. & Co. (2009)

== Features of the story ==
1. The ironical fact about the protagonist is that a gambler and a murderer, who is ignorant of his own future has become an astrologer.
2. The writer reveals how the only qualification needed to be an astrologer in India is saffron clothes, a few charts and tilak and a keen observation of human nature along with a presence of mind.
3. The astrologer should have been greatly relieved that he is not a murderer after all and he has managed to put Guru Nayak off, and he should not have bothered about how much money he had received. Yet, when he realizes Nayak has cheated him of some money he is angry.

== Themes ==
- Irony of fate
- Religion and blind faith
- Crime and Punishment
- Human Greed
- Karma (tit for tat)
