= List of Kannada films of 2025 =

This is a list of Kannada films that were released in 2025.

== Box office collection ==
The highest-grossing Kannada films released in 2025, by worldwide box office gross revenue, are as follows.The total collection of sandalwood movies in 2025 is 1,500 crores. The rank of the films in the following table depends on the estimate of worldwide collections as reported by organizations classified as green by Wikipedia. (Note: See WP:RSP, WP:ICTFSOURCES) There is no official tracking of domestic box office figures within India.

Background shading indicates that a film is currently showing in theatres worldwide.

#	Implies that the film is multilingual and the gross collection figure includes the worldwide collection of the other simultaneously filmed version.

Highest worldwide gross of 2025
Rank	Title	Production company	Worldwide gross	Ref
1	Kantara: Chapter 1	Hombale Films	₹850–852 crore	(Note: Kantara: Chapter 1's reported worldwide grosses vary between ₹850 crore (Deccan Chronicle, Cinema Express, The New Indian Express, and DNA India) – ₹852 crore (Deccan Herald and News18))
2	Mahavatar Narsimha (Note: There is no clear evidence of a primary language. The film's main languages are deemed to be Hindi, Kannada, Tamil and Telugu according to the Indian film censorship body.)	Kleem Productions	₹300–325 crore #	(Note: Mahavatar Narsimha's reported worldwide grosses vary between ₹300 crore (Hindustan Times, Cinema Express, News18) – ₹324.5 crore (The Economic Times) – ₹325 crore (DNA India))
3	Su From So	Lighter Buddha Films	₹125 crore	
4	Mark	Sathya Jyothi Films; Kiccha Creations	₹51.30 crore	
5	The Devil	Vaishno Studios; Jai Mata Combines	₹43 crore	
6	45	Suraj Productions	₹21 crore	
7	Junior (Note: The film was produced in Kannada and Telugu)	Vaaraahi Chalana Chitram	₹16 crore	
8	Ekka	PRK Productions; KRG Studios; Jayanna Films	₹12 crore	
9	Maadeva	Radhakrishna Pictures	₹10 crore	
10	Choo Mantar	Tharun Studios	₹11.5 crore	

== January–March ==
Opening		Title	Director	Cast	Studio	Ref.
J A N U A R Y	3	After Breakup	Biju	Dhanush; Nisarga Manjunath	Friday Magic Studios	
J A N U A R Y	3	Guns and Roses	H. S. Srinivas Kumar	Arjun Vishwakarma; Yashvika Nishkala; Kishore; Avinash	Dhrona Creations	
J A N U A R Y	3	Swechha	Suresh Raju	Anvish Anand; Shree Lakshmi; Spandana Prasad; Murahari Reddy	Star Masth Victory Arts	
J A N U A R Y	10	Choo Mantar	Navaneeth	Sharan; Meghana Gaonkar; Aditi Prabhudeva; Chikkanna; Prabhu Mundkur	Tarun Studios	
J A N U A R Y	10	Nimma Vasthugalige Neeve Javaabdaararu	Keshav Murthy	Dileep Raj; Shilpa Manjunath; Madhusudan Govind; Apoorva Bharadwaj; Prasanna Shetty	Native Craft; Picture Shop	
J A N U A R Y	10	Teddy Bear	Lokesh B.	Bhargav B. V.; Shyamala Simha; Sparsha Rekha; Disha Poovaiah	Adhyalakshmi Productions	
J A N U A R Y	17	Kanna Muchhe Kaade Goode	Nataraj Krishnegowda	Raghavendra Rajkumar; Atharva Prakash; Prarthana Suvarna; Jyothish Shetty; Aravind Bolar	Darling Productions	
J A N U A R Y	17	Ravanapura	Kumar M. Bagvalli	Rathan Kalyan; Raksha Nimbargi; Vasanth Kalyan; Rajeshwari Kollegala	Singnalluru Chowdeshwari Combines	
J A N U A R Y	17	Sanju Weds Geetha 2	Nagashekar	Srinagar Kitty; Rachita Ram; Ragini Dwivedi; Rangayana Raghu; Sadhu Kokila; Sampath Raj	Pavithra International Movie Makers; Mahanadi Creations	
J A N U A R Y	24	Forest	Chandra Mohan	Chikkanna; Anish Tejeshwar; Gurunandan; Rangayana Raghu; Sharanya Shetty; Archana Kottige	NMK Cinemas	
J A N U A R Y	24	Royal	Dinakar Thoogudeepa	Viraat; Sanjana Anand; Chaya Singh; Raghu Mukherjee; Pramod Shetty; Rangayana Raghu; Achyuth Kumar	Jayanna Combines	
J A N U A R Y	24	Ride	N. Bhanu Teja	R. Venkatesh Gowda; P. Thanvi; Neeraj Kumar; Ravi	Shri Varasiddhi Vinayaka Production	
J A N U A R Y	24	Rudra Garuda Purana	K. S. Nandeesh	Rishi; Priyanka Kumar; Avinash Yelandur; Prabhakar; Giri	Ashwini Arts	
J A N U A R Y	30	Alle Draw Alle Bahumana	Rathna Theertha	Shourya Vikas; Rushika Raj; Rishi; Vijay Chendoor	Janani Films	
J A N U A R Y	31	#ParuParvathy	Rohit Keerthi	Deepika Das; Fawaz Ashraf; Poonam Sirnaik; K. S. Shridhar	Eighteen Thirty Six Pictures	
J A N U A R Y	31	Begur Colony	Flying King Manju	Rajeev Hanu; Pallavi Parva; Flying King Manju; Posani Krishna Murali; Bala Rajwadi	Srima Cinemas	
J A N U A R Y	31	Gana	Hari Prasad Jakka	Prajwal Devaraj; Vedhika; Yasha Shivakumar; Sampath Raj; Ravi Kale	Cherry Creations	
J A N U A R Y	31	Hyena	Venkat Bharadwaj	Harsh Arjun; Venkat Bharadwaj; Laxman Shivashankar; Diganth Dhanush	Ms. Amrutha Film Center	
J A N U A R Y	31	Ittige Goodinalli Raja Rani	Ranadheer Vijay	Ranadheer Vijay; Rithanya Shetty; Jai Prakash Reddy; Yogesh	Sri Chamundeshwari movie makers	
J A N U A R Y	31	Kaadu Male	Samartha Manjunath	Artha Harshan; Sangeetha Rajaram; Karthik Bhat; Gilli Manju	Cosmos Movies	
J A N U A R Y	31	Nodidavaru Enanthare	Kuldeep Cariappa	Naveen Shankar; Apoorva Bharadwaj; Padmavati Rao; Spandana Prasad; Shwetha Srinivas	Hippo and Kiddo Motion Pictures Pvt. Ltd	
J A N U A R Y	31	Ravutha	Siddu Vajrappa	Raj Prawin; Bhavani Purohith; Maresh Yadav; Narsihma Murthy	Shree Vishwakarma Cinemas	
F E B R U A R Y	7	Adhipatra	Chayan Shetty	Roopesh Shetty; Jahnavi Mahadi; Prakash Thuminad; Raghu Pandeshwar	Belaku Films	
F E B R U A R Y	7	Anamadheya Ashok Kumar	Sagar Kumar	Kishore Kumar. G; Harshil Koushik; Sudheendran Nair; Gagana	SKN Films	
F E B R U A R Y	7	Bhagiratha 2025 movie	Ram Janardhan	Jaya Prakash; Nisarga Annappa; Chandana Raghavendra; Shivaraj K. R. Pete; Ravi Kale	Sai Ramesh Productions	
F E B R U A R Y	7	Gajarama	Sunil Kumar VA	Raja Vardan; Tapaswini Poonachha; Ragini Dwivedi; Kabir Duhan Singh; Sharath Lohitashwa	Life Line Films	
F E B R U A R Y	7	Mandya	Sanjay Niranjan	Gavie Chahal; Deepshika Nagpal; Danish Muhammad; Prakash Dhotre	Sanam Productions India	
F E B R U A R Y	7	Mr. Rani	Madhu Chandra	Deepak Subramanya; Parvati Nair; Shrivatsa Shyam; Lakshmi Karanth	Excel Orbit Creations	
F E B R U A R Y	7	Sharanara Shakti	Dileep V. Sharma	Ramesh Pandit; Shruti Hegde; Manjunath Gouda Patil; Sachi Jain	Srisha Films	
F E B R U A R Y	7	Talwar	Mumtaz Murali	Dharma Keerthiraj; Adithi Rao; Jayram Karthik; Sharath Lohitashwa; Avinash. S	Touch Pictures	
F E B R U A R Y	7	Unlock Raghava	Deepak Madhuvanahalli	Milind Gautham; Rachel David; Avinash; Bhoomi Shetty; Ramesh Bhat	Mayura Motion Pictures	
F E B R U A R Y	14	Bhuvanam Gaganam	Gireesh Mulimani	Pruthvi Ambaar; Pramod; Rachel David; Ponnu Ashwathi; Achyuth Kumar	SVC Films	
F E B R U A R Y	14	Justice	Karthik Venkatesh	Sarkar Sahill; Manya Riya; Chethan Krishna; Ali Baba; Riya Bhaskar	Max Entertainment	
F E B R U A R Y	14	Nimitta Matra	Roshan D'Souza	Poornachandra Mysore; Sangeetha Rajeev; Aravind Kuplikar; Lakshmi Karanth	Silver Opera Productions	
F E B R U A R Y	14	Raju James Bond	Deepak Madhuvanahalli	Gurunandan; Mrudula Pattanshetti; Achyuth Kumar; Chikkanna; Sadhu Kokila	Karma Bros Productions	
F E B R U A R Y	14	Sidlingu 2	Vijaya Prasad	Yogesh; Sonu Gowda; Suman Ranganathan; B. Suresha	Niharika Movies	
F E B R U A R Y	21	Bhaava Theera Yaana	Mayur Ambekallu; Thejas Kiran	Thejas Kiran; Ramesh Bhat; Vidya Murthy; Arohi Naina; Anoosha Krishna	Aroha Films	
F E B R U A R Y	21	Eddelu Manjunatha 2	Guruprasad	Guruprasad; Rachitha Mahalakshmi; Chaithra J. Achar; Sharath Lohitashwa	Ram Movies	
F E B R U A R Y	21	Gagana Kusuma	Nagendra Kumar Jain	S. K. Prakash Sannakki; Kavya Prakash; Harini Nataraj; Dinesh Gowda	SS Creations	
F E B R U A R Y	21	Nanagu Love Aagidhe	Vijay Rajashekar	Soma Vijay; Thejaswini Reddy; Naveen Rishi; Ravi Raaj	Sri Kaali Amman Pictures	
F E B R U A R Y	21	Navami 9-9-1999	Pavan Narayan	Yashas Abhi; Nandini Gowda; S. Narayan; Om Prakash Rao; Huccha Venkat	Shree Annapoorneshwari Creations	
F E B R U A R Y	21	Nimagondu Sihi Suddi	Raghu Bhat; Sudhindra. N	Raghu Bhat; Kavya Shetty; Harini Shreekanth; Vijay Raghavendra; Sujay Shastry	Avyakta Cinemas	
F E B R U A R Y	21	Olavina Payana	Kishan Balnad	Sunil Kumar; Kushi P. S.; Priya Hegde; Padmaja Rao; Bala Rajwadi	Mulagund Creation	
F E B R U A R Y	21	Raja Roja	Uday Prem	Divakar; Preethi Yesudas; Kuri Sunil; Mirchi Manikanta	Adrushta Combines	
F E B R U A R Y	21	Shanubhogara Magalu	Kodlu Ramakrishna	Kishore Kumar. G; Ragini Chandran; Ramesh Bhat; Sudha Belawadi	Bhuvan Films	
F E B R U A R Y	21	VidyaGanesh	Dr. Umeshchandra	Mallu Jhamkandi; Sulaksha Kaira; Suchendra Prasad; Ramesh Bhat	Deviputra Cine Creations	
F E B R U A R Y	21	Vishnu Priya	V. K. Prakash	Shreyas Manju; Priya Prakash Varrier; Suchendra Prasad; Achyuth Kumar; Nihal Raj Gowda	K. Manju Cinemaas	
F E B R U A R Y	21	Yello Jogappa Ninnaramane	Hayavadana	Anjan Nagendra; Venya Rai; Sanjana Doss; Sharath Lohitashwa	Pandoras Box Productions; Krishnachhaya Chitra	
F E B R U A R Y	28	1990s	Nandakumar C. M.	Arun Kumar; Rani Warad; Swapna Shettigar; Suprith	Manasu Mallige Combines	
F E B R U A R Y	28	Apaayavide Eccharike	Abhijith Thirthahalli	Vikash Uthaiah; Radha Bhagavathi; Raghav Kodachadri; Harini Shreekanth; Mithun Thirthahalli	Yashaswini Creations	
F E B R U A R Y	28	FIR 6 to 6	Ramana Raj K. V.	Vijay Raghavendra; Siri Raju; Yash Shetty; Swati Satish; Bala Rajwadi	Yasha Films	
F E B R U A R Y	28	Monk The Young	Maschith Suriya	Sarovar. R; Soundarya Gowda; Babloo Prithiveeraj; Usha Bhandary	Volcano Pictures	
F E B R U A R Y	28	Nagavalli Bangale	Kavi Rajesha	Yashwant Kumar; Roopashree Gowda; N. L. Narendra Babu; Sushma Kumari	Hamsah Visions	
F E B R U A R Y	28	Pratyartha	Arjun Kamath	Ramnath Shanbag; Akshay Karkala; Shruthi Chandrashekar; Suman; Naveen D. Padil	Sandalwood Films; Vishishta Films	
F E B R U A R Y	28	Shabhash Baddimagane	B. S. Rajashekar	Pramod Shetty; Adya Priya; Prakash Thuminad; Mithra; Kavya Ramesh	Kishan Productions	
F E B R U A R Y	28	Viramada Nantara	Vishwanath Singarmatt	Vvihan Kaarthik; Pavithra Raj; Sanvi Raju; Naveen Kumar Mandya; Raghu Ramanakoppa	Sri Sugureshwara Creations	
M A R C H	6	Soori Loves Sandhya	Yadav Raj	Abhhimanyuu Kashinath; Apurva; Prathap Narayan; Pradeep Kabra	7 Crore Entertainments	
M A R C H	7	Apple Cut	Sindhu Gowda	Surya Gowda; Ashwini Polepalli; Bala Rajwadi; Amrutha Pawar; Santhosh G.	Sanvi Productions	
M A R C H	7	Interval	Bharatvarsh	Shashi Raj; Sukesh Suki; Prajwal Kumar Gowda; Charithra Rao; Sahana Aradhya	BharatVarsh Pictures	
M A R C H	7	Kanasondu Shuruvagide	Manjesh Bhagwath	Santosh Billava; Saathvika; Shravya Rao; Thriller Manju; Kuri Sunil	KKR Media House	
M A R C H	7	Kapati	Ravikiran D. Chetan S. P.	Dev Devaiah; Sukrutha Wagle; Sathvik Krishnan; Pavan Venugopal	Dayal Pictures	
M A R C H	7	Mithya	Sumanth Bhat	Athish Shetty; Prakash Thuminad; Roopa Varkady	Paramvah Studios	
M A R C H	7	Rakshasa	Lohith H.	Prajwal Devaraj; Sonal Monteiro; Shobhraj; K. S. Shridhar; Arna Rathod	Shanvi Entertainments	
M A R C H	7	Tarka	Puneeth Manava	Anjan Murthy; Prathima Thakur; Swetha Srinivas; Nivas Sri	Vismaya Enterprises	
M A R C H	14	Ah!	G. Srinivas Ramanagara	Sreejith; Ameeta S. Kulal; Anusha Rai; Yamuna Srinidhi	Yashogiri Chitralaya	
M A R C H	14	Paarithoshaka	Pradeep Thumbinakere	Rakshith. R; Jitendra Nayaka; Aishwarya. C; Akash. M	SAGV Production; Pradeep Madakari Creations	
M A R C H	21	Barget Basya	Rishi Hiremath	Rishi Hiremath; Advika Smitha; Pooja Emmanuel; Punith Chandra	Yarram Reddy Pictures	
M A R C H	21	Narayana Narayana	Srikanth Kenchappa	Dharshan Surya; Kreethi Krishna; Bhimbika Rao; Puneeth B. A.; Gururaj Basavaraj	Sri Krishna Movies; Sumnima Films	
M A R C H	21	Yalpi	M. M. Oblesh Yalpi	M. M. Vijay Chakravarthi; Lohana J. M.	Nakshatra Entertainment	
M A R C H	28	Bad	PC Shekhar	Nakul Gowda; Manvita Kamath; Apoorva Bharadwaj; Sai Krishna	Naada Kiran Pictures	
M A R C H	28	Manada Kadalu	Yogaraj Bhat	Sumukha; Rashika Shetty; Anjali Anish; Rangayana Raghu; H. G. Dattatreya	E. K. Entertainers	
M A R C H	28	Mylaapura	Phaneesh Bharadwaj	Kishan Bilagali; Aishwarya Sindhogi; Nidhi Subbaiah	Reel Load Entertainment	

== April–June ==
Opening		Title	Director	Cast	Studio	Ref.
A P R I L	4	Benkiyabale	Shivaji	Niranjan Raj; Preethi Yashika; Lokesh Raj; Mandya Ramesh	Shivaji Pictures	
A P R I L	4	Nimbiya Banada Myaga Page 1	Ashok Kadaba	Shanmukha Govindraj; Sunad Raj; Thanushree; Ramakrishna; Padma Vasanthi; Bhavya; Sundeep Malani	MGPX Enterprises	
A P R I L	4	Nimde Kathe	Raghavendra Raj	Abhilash Dalapathi; Rashika Shetty; Sihi Kahi Chandru; Manohar Gowda; Reshma V. Gowda	Blue Sky Studios	
A P R I L	10	Vaamana	Shankar Raman	Dhanveer Gowda; Reeshma Nanaiah; Sampath Raj; Tara; Adithya Menon; Achyuth Kumar; Avinash	Equinox Global Entertainment	
A P R I L	10	Vidyapati	Esham Khan, Haseen Khan	Nagabhushana; Rangayana Raghu; Malaika Vasupal	Daali Pictures	
A P R I L	11	Agnyathavasi	Janardhan Chikkanna	Rangayana Raghu; Paavana Gowda; Sharath Lohitashwa; Siddu Moolimani; Ravishankar Gowda	Dakshayini Talkies	
A P R I L	18	Kadeema	Sai Pradeep	Chandan. N; Anoosha K. Bhat; Yash Shetty; Shobhraj; V. Manohar	Shiveshu Productions	
A P R I L	18	Kora	Orata Shree	Tsunami Kitty; Charishma Chondamma; P. Murthy; Sowjanya D. V.	Rathnamma Movies	
A P R I L	18	Preethiya Huccha	V. Kumar	Vijay Victory; Kumkum Harihar; Patre Nagaraj		
A P R I L	18	Ricksha Chalaka	Aayush Shashikumar	Chiranth Kumar; Rajini Gowda; Bala Rajwadi; Harini Shreekanth	Aayush Cine Creations	
A P R I L	18	Veera Chandrahasa	Ravi Basrur	Shiva Rajkumar; Shithil Shetty; Nagashree GS; Prasanna Shettigar Mandarti	Ravi Basrur Movies; Omkar Movies	
A P R I L	18	Yuddhakaanda Chapter 2	Pavan Bhat	Ajay Rao; Archana Jois; Radnya Rakesh; Prakash Belawadi; T. S. Nagabharana	Shree Krishna Arts and Creations; Ajay Rao Productions	
A P R I L	24	Firefly	Vamshi Krishna Srinivas	Vamshi Krishna Srinivas; Rachana Inder; Achyuth Kumar; Sudharani; Sheetal Shetty	Shri Mutthu Cine Services & Productions	
A P R I L	25	Amara Premi Arun	Praveen Kumar G.	Harishaarva; Deepika Aradhya; Dharmanna Kadur; Krithi Bhat	Olavu Cinema	
A P R I L	25	Dasarahalli	M. R. Srinivas	Dharma Keerthiraj; Neha	Vaishnavi Vasundare Creations	
M A Y	1	Puppy	Ayush Malli	Jagadish Koppala; Adithya Sindhanuru; Adrushta Sankanuru; Ruthvik Bellary	B B Sankanur Films	
M A Y	2	Faizu Matthu Hunja	Sharath Bilinele	Belagola Babu; Varshini; M N Suresh; Mohammed Faizan	Unity Movies	
M A Y	2	Nan Poli	Yashwanth M	Yashwanth M.; Disha Shetty; Raichur Devaraj; Shobha Maganur	Parvathy Films	
M A Y	2	Preethi Prema Panganama	Srikanta B. A.	Mutthuraj M. S.; Srikanta B. A.; Dheeraj; Dayana Lessika	M S Mutthuraj Pictures	
M A Y	9	Daskath	Aneesh Poojary Venur	Deekshith K. Andinje; Mohan Sheni; Naveen Bondel; Bhavya Poojary	Jai Bhajarangi Films; Seventy7 Studios; Bodhi Productions	
M A Y	9	Naale Rajaa Koli Majaa	Abhilash Shetty	Samruddhi Kundapura; Sanidhya Acharya; Radha Ramachandra; Prabhakar Kunder	Plan A Films	
M A Y	9	Suthradaari	Kiran Kumar R	Chandan Shetty; Navarasan; Sanjana Anand; Apurva; Tabla Nani	Eagle Media Creations	
M A Y	9	Vicky	Deepak S. Avandkar	Raju Talikote; Bharat Talikote; Sreenidhi Gowda; Vindhya Hegde; Manju Guledgudda	Kesari Nandana Cine Creations	
M A Y	15	Rhythm	Manju Milan	Manju Milan; Meghashree; Suman; Vinaya Prasad; Mukhyamantri Chandru	Manju Movies	
M A Y	16	Arindam	Sawad. M Kalki Agasthya	Kalki Agasthya; Shwetha Bhat Karwar	Royal Arch Cinemas	
M A Y	16	Bande Saheb	Chinmay Ram	Santhosh Ram; Kavya Bharadwaj; Vijanath Biradar; Parveez Simba	Mallige Cine Combines	
M A Y	16	Dee	Vinay Vasudev	Vinay Vasudev; Disha Ramesh; Harini Shreekanth; Bala Rajwadi; Nagendra Urs	VDK Cinemas	
M A Y	16	Light House	Sandeep Kamath Ajekar	Vijay Shobaraj; Manasi Sudhir; Prakash Thuminad; Pruthvi Ambaar	Astra Productions; Amche Creations	
M A Y	16	Love You	S. Narasimhamurthy	AI-generated characters	KPM Studio	
M A Y	16	Takila	K. Praveen Nayak	Dharma Keerthiraj; Nikitha Swamy; Suman Sharma; Nagendra Urs; Kote Prabhakar	Sri Siddhivinayak Films	
M A Y	16	Udaya Surya	S. S. Prakash Raj	Jai Raj; S. S. Prakash Raj; Lavanya Gangadharayya; Tanu Prasad	Sri Siddheshwara Films	
M A Y	23	Jai Kissan	Vikas Vilas Misaal	Janmejay Telang; Smita Tambe; Tanvi Samant	Shree Sai Utsav Films	
M A Y	23	Kirik	Nagathihalli Gangadhar	Ravi Shetty; Pooja Ramachandra; Bala Rajwadi; Tennis Krishna	Shri Muktinaaga Films	
M A Y	23	Kuladalli Keelyavudo	K. Ram Narayan	Madenur Manu; Mouna Guddemane; Sonal Monteiro; Sharath Lohitashwa; Dragon Manju	Yogaraj Cinemas; Pearl Cine Creations	
M A Y	23	Manku Thimmana Kagga	Raja Ravishankar	Ramakrishna; Bhavyashree Rai	Honey Film Makers	
M A Y	30	Taane C/O Srirampura	S. Bhagat Raj	Praveen R; Harinakshi; Bala Rajwadi; Rohith Nagesh	PCO2 Film Factory	
M A Y	30	Thayavva	Sathvik Pavan	Geetha Priya	Jayashankar Talkies	
J U N E	6	College Kalavida	Sanjay Malavalli	Aarav Surya; Chaitra Loknath; Harini Shreekanth; Ramesh Bhat	Gajanana Films	
J U N E	6	Maadeva	Naveen Reddy B.	Vinod Prabhakar; Sonal Monteiro; Srinagara Kitty; Malashri; Shruti; Achyuth Kumar	Radhakrishna Pictures	
J U N E	6	Neethi	Raja Gopal	Kushee Ravi; Sampath Maithreya; Praveen Atharva	Director's cut Productions	
J U N E	6	School Ramayana	Ved M. S.	Deekshith Gowda; Supritha Raj; Apurva Shri; Kiran Aarya	Chahanashree Cinemas	
J U N E	6	Sees Kaddi	Rathan Gangadhar	Cithin Appaiah; Manvi Balgar; B. S. Ramamurthy; Pratham Raje Urs	Grahana	
J U N E	13	Churumuriya	Supriya Nippani	Mahadev Hadapad; Sharadha Mullur	S J Films	
J U N E	13	Edagaiye Apaghatakke Karana	Samarth Kadkol	Diganth Manchale; Nirup Bhandari; Nidhi Subbaiah; Dhanu Harsha; Radhika Narayan	Hyphen Pictures; Keelambi Media Lab	
J U N E	20	Black Sheep	Jeevan Hallikar	Vishal Kiran; Prashanth V. Hari; Shivangi Davey; Nisha Hegde	Glitterers Star House Productions	
J U N E	20	Bullet	Sathyajith; Shabbir	Dharma Keerthiraj; Shreeya Shukla; Ajitha Jha; Bhavya; Shobhraj	Zaks International	
J U N E	20	Deadly Lovers	Nagendra	Akhil Kumar; Thanu Prasad; Lahari Velu; Prema Gowda	Anagha Enterprises	
J U N E	20	Kaalave Mosagara	Sanjay S Puranic	Bharath Sagar; Yashaswini Ravindra; Shankar Murthy; Kuri Prathap; Bank Janardhan	Bhava Spandana Productions; BMW Productions	
J U N E	20	Maatonda Heluve	Mayur Kadi	Mayur Kadi; Apoorva Aradhya; Girish Shivanna; P. D. Satish Chandra; Prateek Radder	Maheshwara Motion Pictures	
J U N E	27	Athani	Samarth M	Samarth M; Madhu B C; Shobhraj; Bhavya; Bala Rajwadi	Abhay Kushi Movies	
J U N E	27	Avanirabekittu	Ashok N Samrat	Bharath Hassan; Sowmya John; Prashanth Siddi; Kiran Naik; M. N. Lakshmi Devi	Novica Cine Productions	
J U N E	27	Bloody Babu	Rajesh Murthy	Dilip Kumar; Yashaswa Murthy; Smitha Gaur; N. L. Narendra Babu	Angel Dreams Entertainments	
J U N E	27	Raja Rathnakara	Veeresh Bommasagar	Chandan Raj; Vidya Shri; Yamuna Srinidhi; Chethan Durga	Chowmuda Films	
J U N E	27	Timmana Mottegalu	Rakshith Theerthahalli	Suchendra Prasad; Ashika Somashekar; Keshav Guttalike; Raghu Ramanakoppa	SriKrishna Productions	
J U N E	27	X & Y	D. Satya Prakash	Atharva Prakash; D. Satya Prakash; Brinda Acharya; Ayaana; Harini Shreekanth	Sathya Pictures	

== July–September ==
Opening		Title	Director	Cast	Studio	Ref.
J U L Y	4	Capital City	R. Anantha Raju	Rajeev Reddy; Prerana Kambam; P. Ravishankar; Suman; Shridhar; Sharath Lohitashwa	Infinity Creations	
J U L Y	4	Hebbuli Cut	Bheemarao P	Mounesh Nataranga; Ananya M. K.; Mahantesh; Mahadev Hadapad	Saada Films	
J U L Y	4	Jungle Mangal	Rakshit Kumar	Yash Shetty; Harshitha Ramachandra; Ugramm Manju; Bala Rajwadi	Sahyadri Studios	
J U L Y	4	Pendrive	Sebastin David	Malashri; Tanisha Kuppanda; Kishan Bilagali; Kari Subbu	RH Enterprises	
J U L Y	5	Kapata Nataka Sutradhari	Dhiraj M. V.	Dhiraj M. V.; Abhirama Arjuna; Murali Shankar; Greeshma Sridhar	VSK Cinemas	
J U L Y	5	Tapassi	Spencer Matthew	V. Ravichandran; Ammayra Goswami; Anusha Kini; Sachin Wairal	Bangalore Movies	
J U L Y	11	1st Day 1st Show	Girish G	Girish G; Jeevitha Vasishta; Aniruddha Shastry; Rohit Srinath	Maanika Movies	
J U L Y	11	Doora Theera Yaana	Mansore	Vijay Krishna; Priyanka Kumar; Shruti Hariharan; Sharath Lohitashwa; Sudha Belawadi	D Creations	
J U L Y	11	Jaava Coffee	Sanvika Sreerangam	Ajay Vardhan; Sanvika Sreerangam; Viji Thampi; Bala Rajwadi; Saju Kodiyan	Adri Star Films	
J U L Y	11	Lakshya	Arjun P. Donur	Hithesh Hiremath; Nidhi Chakravarthy; Tejas Pujar; Sankalpa Sugate; Sumith Bhajantri	Samrata Productions	
J U L Y	18	Ekka	Rohit Padaki	Yuva Rajkumar; Sanjana Anand; Sampada Hulivana; Aditya; Atul Kulkarni; Shruti; Rahul Dev Shetty	PRK Productions; Jayanna Films; KRG Studios	
J U L Y	18	Junior (Note: The film was produced in both the Telugu and Kannada languages)	Radha Krishna Reddy	Kireeti Reddy; Sreeleela; Genelia D'Souza; Ravichandran	Vaaraahi Chalana Chitram	
J U L Y	25	Bandook	Mahesh Ravikumar	Partha; Balaji Manohar; Shwetha Prasad; Gopalkrishna Deshpande; Harish Rai	Sri Honnadevi Combines	
J U L Y	25	Mahavatar Narsimha	Ashwin Kumar	Animated characters	Kleem Productions; Hombale Films	
J U L Y	25	Su From So	J. P. Thuminad	Shaneel Gowtham; J. P. Thuminad; Prakash Thuminad; Sandhya Arakere; Raj B. Shetty	Lighter Buddha Films	
J U L Y	25	Swapna Mantapa	Baraguru Ramachandrappa	Vijay Raghavendra; Ranjani Raghavan; Sundar Raj; Shobha Raghavendra; Ambarish Sarangi; Rajini Gowda	Malai Madeshwara Enterprises	
A U G U S T	1	Eltuu Muthaa	Raa Suryaa	Shaurya Prathapa; Raa Suryaa; Priyanka Malali; Naveen D Padil	High5 Studios	
A U G U S T	1	Kidnap Kavya	Shadakshari B. Neelakantaiah	Lapanga Raja; Raja Vamshi; Revanth. R; Rakshitha Mallikarjun; Sahana. M	26 Yes Studios	
A U G U S T	1	Kothalavadi	Sri Raju G	Pruthvi Ambaar; Kavya Shaiva; Gopalkrishna Deshpande; Rajesh Nataranga; Bala Rajwadi	PA Productions	
A U G U S T	1	Vritta	Likith Kumar	Maahir Moinuddin; Harini Sundararajan; Chaithra J Achar; Srinivas Prabhu	Lakshay Arts	
A U G U S T	8	10 Ne Classu Swalpa Massu	Deepu T. S.	Abhi. S; Sneha T. M.; Raam Kumar; Mahin Kuber	Peppermints Entertainment	
A U G U S T	8	Bharavase	Mutthu A. N.	Vinay Raj; Amrutha V. Raj; Ahalya Suresh; Shobhraj	R. R. Movie Makers	
A U G U S T	8	Custody	J. J. Srinivas	Priya Shatamarshan; J. J. Srinivas; Cockroach Sudhir; Srinivas G. T.	J. J. Srinivas Production	
A U G U S T	8	Palguni	J. J. Srinivas	Rekha Shri; Nagendra Urs; Pavan Kumar; Jayarame Gowda	Brindavan Enterprises	
A U G U S T	8	Rajadrohi	Prakasha Boraiah	Anant Nag; Lakshmi; Sharan; Abhijeeth; Orata Prashanth; Manasa Shivanna; Ajit Patre	Dhanush Combines	
A U G U S T	22	Hacche	Yashodhara. A	Abhimanyu N. S.; Adya Priya; Anu Prema; Devatha Manu	Ashwa Films	
A U G U S T	22	Just Married	C. R. Bobby	Shine Shetty; Ankita Amar; Devaraj; Shruti; Sruthi Hariharan; Sriman; Anup Bhandari; Achyuth Kumar	ABBS Studios	
A U G U S T	22	Kamaro2	A. Paramesh	Priyanka Upendra; Swaminathan Anantharama; Rajini Bharadwaj; Nagendra Urs; Raghavendra Rajkumar	Kanasu Pictures	
A U G U S T	22	Love Matteru	Virata Bilwa	Virata Bilwa; Sonal Monteiro; Suman Ranganathan; Achyuth Kumar; Anitha Bhat	INK Cinemas; Silverhythm Production; BR Cinemas	
A U G U S T	29	Andondittu Kaala	Keerthi Krishnappa	Vinay Rajkumar; Aditi Prabhudeva; Nisha Ravikrishnan; Aruna Balraj; Ravichandran	Bhuvan Movies	
A U G U S T	29	Balya	V. M. Raju	Narayan Swamy; Apsara Suresh; Nischitha Neel; Bullet Vinod; Dakshith Ramesh	Shri Jaganmathe Enterprises	
A U G U S T	29	Gandhi Matthu Notu	Yogi Devagange	Divija Nagendra Prasad; Purushotham Talwat; Prajna Brahmavar; Lokesh Kogile	Bhavana Combines	
A U G U S T	29	Gowrishankara	Anees	V. Ravichandran; Apoorva	Omkar Movies	
A U G U S T	29	Muruga S/O Kaanunu	Vijay Praveen	Muni Krishna; Chirashree Anchan; Mamatha Rahuth; Vinaya Prasad; Shobhraj; Thriller Manju	A. S. A. Productions	
A U G U S T	29	Rippan Swamy	Kishor Moodbidre	Vijay Raghavendra; Ashwini Chandrashekhar; Prakash Thuminad; Vajradeer Jain; Yamuna Srinidhi	Panchaanana Films	
A U G U S T	29	Usiru	Panem Prabhakar	Thilak Shekar; Priya Hegde; Naidile Shaiva; Bala Rajwadi; Raaghu Ramanakoppa	RSP Productions	
S E P T E M B E R	5	31 Days	Raja Ravikumar	Niranjan Kumar Shetty; Prajwaly Suvarna; Chillar Manju; Akshay Karkala	N Star Production	
S E P T E M B E R	5	Austin na Mahan Mouna	Vinay Kumar Vaidyanathan	Vinay Kumar Vaidyanathan; Prakriti Prasad; Risha Gowda; Bala Rajwadi	AVV Productions	
S E P T E M B E R	5	Elumale	Punit Rangaswamy	Raanna; Priyanka Achar; Kishore; Jagapathi Babu; T. S. Nagabharana	De Arte Studios; Tharun Sudhir Kreativez	
S E P T E M B E R	5	Kudla Namdu Uuru	Durga Prasad RK	Durga Prasad RK; Anika Shetty; Ramesh BH; Shreya Shetty	Kritartha Production	
S E P T E M B E R	5	Naanu Matthu Gunda 2	Raghu Hassan	Rakesh Adiga; Rachana Inder; Govinde Gowda; Vijay Chendoor; Manju Pavagada	Poem Pictures	
S E P T E M B E R	5	Namo Venkatesha	Vijay Bhardwaj	Vijay Bharadwaj; Anvita Sagar; Deepa KM; Shyam Sundar	Vijay Dhwaja Cinemas	
S E P T E M B E R	5	Om Shivam	Alwin Francis	Bhargav Krishna; Viranika Shetty; Cockroach Sudhir; Ravi Kale	Deepa Movies	
S E P T E M B E R	12	Green Girl	Sarthak Hegde	Sucharitha Haritas; Mayur Gowda; Sudarshan Yekkar	Sarthak Hegde Film	
S E P T E M B E R	12	Guri	Selvam Mathappan	Achyuth Kumar; Ugramm Manju; Jivith Bhushan; Sai Thej; Jayashree Raj	Vishnu Durga Production	
S E P T E M B E R	12	Jambu Circus	M. D. Sridhar	Praveen Tej; Anjali Aneesh; Achyuth Kumar; Ravishankar Gowda; Avinash	Sri Mahathi Combines	
S E P T E M B E R	12	Maayavi	Shankar G.	Raghu Ram R.; Nischitha Shetty; M. K. Mata; Surya Praveen; Samartha Suresh Babu	Sri Durga Security Services	
S E P T E M B E R	12	Middle Class Ramayana	Dhanush Gowda V.	Vinu Gowda; Mokshitha Pai; Yukta Pervi; S. Narayan; Veena Sundar; Shobaraj	Anjanadhri Productions	
S E P T E M B E R	12	Nidradevi Next Door	Suraag Sagar	Shine Shetty; Praveer Shetty; Rishika Naik; Sruthi Hariharan; Sudharani	Suram Movies	
S E P T E M B E R	12	Ramanagara	Vijay Raj	Prabhu Swamy; Meghana SK; Himashree	Chandan Surya Productions	
S E P T E M B E R	12	Room Boy	Ravi Nagadadinni	Likhit Surya; Raksha Nimbargi; Yash Shetty; Ammu Rajani; Ashwin Hassan	I Can Productions	
S E P T E M B E R	12	September 10	Om Sai Prakash	Shashi Kumar; Jayasimha Kotapati; Rishitha Malnad; Ramesh Bhat; Padma Vasanthi; Ganesh Rao; Sihi Kahi Chandru	Shridevi Pictures	
S E P T E M B E R	12	S/O Muthanna	Srikanth Hunsur	Pranam Devaraj; Kushee Ravi; Rangayana Raghu; Suchendra Prasad; Girish Shivanna; Tabla Nani; Srinivas Prabhu; Sudha Belawadi	Purathana Films	
S E P T E M B E R	19	Arasayyana Prema Prasanga	JVR Deepu	Mahantesh Hiremath; Rashmitha R Gowda; PD Sathish; Vijay Chendoor; Raghu Ramanakoppa	Raj Kamala Pictures	
S E P T E M B E R	19	Jotheyagi Hithavagi	A. R. Krishna	Agastya K; Suvartha M; Anand Ninasam; Bhumika Deshpande; Chetan Durga	Shriratna Film Company	
S E P T E M B E R	19	Kamal Sridevi	Sunil Kumar VA	Sachin Cheluvarayaswami; Sangeetha Bhat; Kishore; Akshitha Bopaiah; Mithra	Swarnambika Pictures	
S E P T E M B E R	19	Khaali Dabba	K Prakash Ambale	Ram Gudi; Adya Priya; Haritha Shah; Kuri Prathap	SUA Entertainments	
S E P T E M B E R	19	Soul Mates	Shankar P V	Sreejith; Prasanna V Shetty; Yashvika Nishkala; Yash Shetty; Sharath Lohitashwa; Aravind Rao	AV Creations	
S E P T E M B E R	26	Kunte Bille	Siddegowda GBS	Yadu Balaji; Meghashree; Suchendra Prasad; Bhavani Prakash; Sudha Belawadi; Bala Rajwadi	Jeevitha Creations	

== October–December ==
Opening		Title	Director	Cast	Studio	Ref.
O C T O B E R	2	Kantara: Chapter 1	Rishab Shetty	Rishab Shetty; Rukmini Vasanth; Gulshan Devaiah; Jayaram; Pramod Shetty	Hombale Films	
O C T O B E R	17	Premigala Gamanakke	Vincent Inbaraj	Shashikumar B. S.; Chirashree Anchan; Subbu S	Citadil Films; Joita Entertainments	
O C T O B E R	17	Time Pass	K. Chethan Jodidhar	Imran Pasha; Ratsha Ram; Ashwini Srinivas; Om Shri; Prabhakar Rao	Sri Chethan Services	
O C T O B E R	23	Aridra	Ajay Surya	Ajay Surya; Navya Shree; Yogeesh Tiptur; Manjesh Gowda	Ajay Surya Films	
O C T O B E R	24	Bili Chukki Halli Hakki	Mahesh Gowda	Mahesh Gowda; Kaajal Kunder; Veena Sundar; Jahangeer M. S.	Honnudi Productions	
O C T O B E R	24	Dilmaar	M Chandramouli	Ram Gowda; Aditi Prabhudeva; Dimple Hayathi; P. Sai Kumar	Sri Vigneshwara Cinemas	
O C T O B E R	24	Green	Raaj Vijay	Gopalkrishna Deshpande; Balaji Manohar; RJ Vikki; Dimpy Fadhya	Bourn Films; Savika Enterprises	
O C T O B E R	24	Newton's 3rd Law	Sudhaakar Reddy	Vishuo Siid; Vidyashree Gowda; Shrinidhi H. R.; Vijay Chendoor	Sunn Craft	
O C T O B E R	24	Tortoise: The Tale of Murders	Venkatesh N	Suraj Shetty; Vidya Prabhu; Chillar Manju	Suraj Setty Films	
O C T O B E R	24	Yarigoo Helbedi	Shiva Ganesh	Chethan Vicky; Chaithra J Achar; Appanna Ramdurga; Ashwini Polepalli; Shabareesh Kabbinale	Sunil Productions	
O C T O B E R	31	Brat	Shashank	Krishna; Manisha Kandkur; Achyuth Kumar; Ramesh Indira; Dragon Manju	Dolphin Entertainment	
O C T O B E R	31	Kona	Hari Krishna S	Komal Kumar; Tanisha Kuppanda; Raghu Ramanakoppa; Vijay Chendoor	Kuppandas Production	
O C T O B E R	31	Omen	Vibhin S. Santhosh	Ajay Kumar; Nishma Shetty; Mythri Jaggi; Keerthana Phulki	Maravanji Productions; Sri Angala Parameshwari Movie Makers	
N O V E M B E R	7	DDD	B. Manjunath	Raghu Shivamogga; Gagana Malnad; Chals Tony; Arun Venkatraj; Mohan Suri	KBM Productions	
N O V E M B E R	7	Hey Prabhu	Venkat Bharadwaj	Venkat Bharadwaj; Samhita Vinya; Laxman Shivashankar; Yamuna Srinidhi	Amruth Film Center; 24 Reels	
N O V E M B E R	7	I Am God	Ravi B Gowda	Ravi B Gowda; Vijetha Pareek; P. Ravishankar; Avinash; Aruna Balraj	CBG Productions	
N O V E M B E R	7	Jai Gadakesari	Manju Hosapeta	Raj Charan Brahmavar; Eshwar Nayaka; Jeevitha Vasishta; Prashanth Siddi; Avinash; Dharma. B	BB Movie Creations	
N O V E M B E R	7	Love U Muddu	Kumaar L	Siddu Moolimani; Reshmaa L; Rajesh Nataranga; Tabla Nani; Girish Shivanna	Kishan Entertainments	
N O V E M B E R	7	Nishiddha	Susamaya Dinesh	Anjan Thammaiah; Shwetha Poojari; Shruthi. R; Lalu Sab	Sneha Jivi Creation	
N O V E M B E R	7	Rona	K. Sathish Kumar	Raghu Raja Nanda; Prakruthi Prasad; Sharath Lohitashwa; Bala Rajwadi	BKR Productions	
N O V E M B E R	14	Gatha Vaibhava	Suni	S. S. Dushyanth; Ashika Ranganath; Kishan Bilagali	Suni Cinemas; Servegara Silver Screens	
N O V E M B E R	14	Hikora	Ninasam Kitty	Yash Shetty; Spandana; Ninasam Kitty; Prakash Belawadi; Guruprasad	Neelakanteshwara Cine Combines	
N O V E M B E R	14	Iniyana Aathma	Naresh Siddaghatta	Siddharth Hari; Nisha Reddy; Kolar Surya; Raksha Hiremath	Sri Vinayaka Venkateshwara Films	
N O V E M B E R	14	Jai	Roopesh Shetty	Roopesh Shetty; Adhvithi Shetty; Raj Deepak Shetty; Naveen D. Padil; Suniel Shetty	R S Cinemas; Shoolin Films; Mugrody Productions	
N O V E M B E R	14	Kite Brothers	Viren Sagar Bagade	Praneel Nadgir; Vinod Bagade; Samarth Aashi; Shreya Harihara	Bhajaranga Cinema	
N O V E M B E R	14	Love OTP	Aniissh Tejeshwar	Aniissh Tejeshwar; Rajeev Kanakala; Swaroopinii; Jhanvika Kalakeri	Bhavaprita Productions	
N O V E M B E R	14	Premam Madhuram	Gandhi Reddy	Gandhi Reddy; Aishwarya Dinesh; Sihi Kahi Chandru; Anusha Sampath Jain; Lapanga Raja	Ruby Creations	
N O V E M B E R	14	Udaala	Amol Patil	Pruthvi Shamanur; Hrithika Srinivas; Bala Rajwadi; Vijanath Biradar	Ravi Shamanur Films; Yogaraj Movies	
N O V E M B E R	21	Congratulations Brother	Prathap Gandharva	Rakshith Nag; Sanjana Doss; Anusha A; Shashikumar	Kallur Cinemas; Pen & Paper Studios	
N O V E M B E R	21	Full Meals	N Vinayaka	Likith Shetty; Kushee Ravi; Thejaswini Sharma; Rangayana Raghu; Rajesh Nataranga	Ambiencia Productions	
N O V E M B E R	21	Giduga	Kempegowda Magadi	Rathish Coorg; Bhavani; Bhanu Asha; Revanna Magadi	Shri Cinimas	
N O V E M B E R	21	Marutha	S. Narayan	Shreyas Manju; Duniya Vijay; Ravichandran; Brinda Acharya; Tara; Nishvika Naidu; Rangayana Raghu	Eesha Productions	
N O V E M B E R	21	Radheyaa	Vedaguru	Krishna Ajai Rao; Sonal Monteiro; Dhanya Balakrishna; Aravind Rao	Keerthi Chahna Cinema Karkhaane	
N O V E M B E R	21	The Task	Raghu Shivamogga	Jaya Surya Azad; Sagar Ram; Achyuth Kumar; Sangeetha Bhat; Balaji Manohar	Lokapujya Picture House	
N O V E M B E R	28	Acharya Sri Shankara	Raja Ravishankar	Ramakrishna; Vinaya Prasad; Ramesh Bhat; Prathama Prasad; Ravindra Bhagavat	Yammanoor Creations	
N O V E M B E R	28	Bank of Bhagyalakshmi	Abhishek Manjunath	Dheekshith Shetty; Gopalkrishna Deshpande; Brinda Acharya; Sadhu Kokila; Sruthi Hariharan	Shree Devi Entertainers	
N O V E M B E R	28	Bicchugatthiya Bantana Ballirena	Anil Dorasamudra	Cheluvaraj Gowda; Sweedal D'Souza; Basuma Kodagu; Shylesh Kengeri; Yashas B	Dorasamudra Pictures	
N O V E M B E R	28	Flirt	Chandan Kumar	Chandan Kumar; Nimika Ratnakar; Akshitha Bopaiah; Vinay Gowda; Girish Shivanna; Shruti	Everest Pictures	
N O V E M B E R	28	GST	Srujan Lokesh	Srujan Lokesh; Rajani Bharadwaj; Sharath Lohitashwa; Vinaya Prasad; Girija Lokesh; Ravishankar Gowda; Nivedita Gowda	Sandesh Productions; Lokesh Productions	
N O V E M B E R	28	Operation London Cafe (Note: The film was produced in both the Kannada and Marathi languages)	Sadagara Raghavendra	Arjun Kapikad; Kaveesh Shetty; Megha Shetty; Shivani Surve; Virat Madake; Ashwini Chavare	Indian Film Factory	
N O V E M B E R	28	Nayi Ide Yecharikae	Kali Gowda	Pramod Shetty; Leela Mohan; Manasa Gowda; Dinesh Mangalore	Laughing Peacock Production	
N O V E M B E R	28	Paatashaala	Heddur Manjunath Hegde	Balaji Manohar; Kiran Nayak; Baby Manya; Samruddhi Kumar	Final Cut Productions	
N O V E M B E R	28	Tantra	Vishwanath Kalagi	Shashikant Natikar; Meghana Malnad; Soujanya Raj; Vikrant Patil	First Copy Movies	
D E C E M B E R	5	Chitralahari	K. R. Suresh	Varun Devaiah; Ganavi Suresh; Srikanth Sriki; Harshitha Nagaraj	Kesari Nandana Cine Creations	
D E C E M B E R	5	Dharmam	Nagamukha Akki Alur	Sai Shashi Kumar; Viranika Shetty; Ashok Hegde	Shantha Cinemas	
D E C E M B E R	5	Kempu Haladi Hasiru	Mani A J Karthikeyan	Srihan Deepak; Divya Suresh; Shailashree Mukki; Aravind Bolar	Sunrise Entertainment and Films	
D E C E M B E R	5	Samaya	S. R. Pramod	S. R. Pramod; Ramya R; Bhimanna Nayak	Pramod Pictures	
D E C E M B E R	5	Vishwaroopini Sri Vasavi	Vemagal Jagannath Rao	Amrutha Murthy; Aryan B S; Rohith Nagesh; Sunil Banawasi; Hema Dutt	Paratpara Films	
D E C E M B E R	11	The Devil	Prakash Veer	Darshan; Rachana Rai; Mahesh Manjrekar; Sharmiela Mandre; Gilli Nata	Vaishno Studios; Jai Mata Combines	
D E C E M B E R	12	Padmagandhi	Suchendra Prasad	G. L. Bhat; Paripoorna Chandrashekar; Dr. Gowri Subramanya	Suchit Films	
D E C E M B E R	12	Peotu	Karthik Rajan	Likith M. N.; Ashwini Chavare; Manjula Reddy; Ganesh D. S.	Grace film company	
D E C E M B E R	25	45	Arjun Janya	Shiva Rajkumar; Upendra; Raj B. Shetty; Jisshu Sengupta; Kaustubha Mani	Suraj Productions	
D E C E M B E R	25	Mark	Vijay Kartikeyaa	Sudeepa; Naveen Chandra; Roshni Prakash; Shine Tom Chacko; Vikranth	Sathya Jyothi Films; Kichcha Creations	

== See also ==
- List of Kannada films of 2024
- List of Kannada films
- List of Kannada films of 2026
