= Ekka (film) =

2025 film by Rohit Padaki

- Theatrical release poster
- Directed by: Rohit Padaki
- Written by: Rohit Padaki; Vikram Hathvar
- Screenplay by: Rohit Padaki
- Story by: Rohit Padaki; Vikram Hathvar
- Produced by: Ashwini Puneeth Rajkumar; Jayanna- Bhogendra; Karthik Gowda; Yogi G Raj
- Starring: Yuva Rajkumar; Sanjana Anand; Sampada Hulivana; Atul Kulkarni
- Cinematography: Satya Hegde
- Edited by: Deepu S. Kumar
- Music by: Charan Raj
- Production companies: PRK Productions; Jayanna Films; KRG Studios
- Release date: 18 July 2025
- Running time: 148 minutes
- Country: India
- Language: Kannada
- Box office: ₹12 crore

Ekka (transl. Ace) is a 2025 Indian Kannada-language action drama film directed by Rohit Padaki and produced jointly by PRK Productions in association with Jayanna Films and KRG Studios. The film stars Yuva Rajkumar, Sanjana Anand and Sampada Hulivana, while Aditya, Atul Kulkarni, Shruti play supporting roles. The music was composed by Charan Raj, while the cinematography and editing were handled by Satya Hegde and Deepu S. Kumar respectively.

Ekka was released on 18 July 2025 and registered the biggest opening among Kannada films of the year at that time with around 1-1.5cr opening.

== Premise ==
A rural thug from Parvathipura, Mutthu, gets entangled in a whirlwind of unanticipated challenges in the Bengaluru underworld when he sets out to seek vengeance on his friend, Ramesh, after he betrayed him.

== Cast ==
- Yuva Rajkumar as Mutthu
- Sanjana Anand as Nandini
- Sampada Hulivana as Mallika, a dancer
- Atul Kulkarni as Mastan Bhai
- Aditya as ACP Durga Prasad
- Shruti as Ratna, Mutthu's mother
- Sadhu Kokila as Pinto, a cab business owner
- Rahul Dev Shetty
- Poornachandra Mysore as Daddy
- Arun Sagar as Garbage Ganga
- Puneeth Rudranag as Honte Seena, Nandini's brother
- Dr. Suri as Kaveri's husband
- Harini Shreekanth as Kaveri
- Archana Kottige
- Jali Jack
- Baby Arya Sriram

== Production ==
=== Pre-production ===
The production team PRK Productions, KRG Studios and Jayanna Films announced the title of Yuva Rajkumar's second film as Ekka on 1 November 2024 which also marked the Karnataka Rajyotsava day. It was revealed that it would be directed by Rohit Padaki of Dayavittu Gamanisi and Rathnan Prapancha fame and music will be composed by Charan Raj. Bollywood actor Atul Kulkarni was confirmed to be a part of the cast during November end, marking his return to Kannada cinema after three years. Actor Aditya was also reported to be part of the cast and he would play the role of a cop. A teaser of was released in April 2025, where the official cast and crew of the film was revealed. Yuva Rajkumar expressed that the looks in the teaser is inspired by Puneeth Rajkumar's look in Jackie, however there will be no other similarities. Sampada and Sanjana Anand were reported to be part of the female lead cast, which was later confirmed by the team.

=== Filming ===
The film went on floors on 28 November 2024. Majority of the film was shot in and around Bengaluru with other places being Kashmir, Kolkata, Mumbai, and at a village near Mysore. The total shooting took about 85 days to complete.

== Soundtrack ==
The soundtrack, composed by Charan Raj, teaming up for the first time with director Rohit Padaki. The second single "Bangle Bangari" released in June 2025 crossed 10 Million views in 22 days of its release. Another single "Rowdy Rhymes" was released on 8 July 2025 which had lyrics emphasizing different shades and traits of a rowdy life in A to Z alphabetical order. The audio rights were acquired by Anand Audio.

Track listing
No.	Title	Lyrics	Singer(s)	Length
1.	"Ekka Maar"	Nagarjun Sharma	Rohit Padaki, Charan Raj, Mahalingam V. M.	5:03
2.	"Bangle Bangari"	Nagarjun Sharma	Anthony Daasan	4:23
3.	"Rowdy Rhymes"	Rohit Padaki, Nagarjun Sharma	Rohit Padaki, Charan Raj	5:01
4.	"Mouna"	Rohit Padaki	Sanjith Hegde	3:12
5.	"Bidu Gaadi Yene Barali"	Vikram Hatwar	Madhuri Seshadri	3:22
6.	"Dooradalli Yaaro Ninthu"	Rohit Padaki	Satish Ragunathan	3:23
Total length:				14:36

== Reception ==
=== Critical response ===
A. Sharadhaa of Cinema Express rated the film 3/5 stars and wrote, "Director Rohit Padaki presents a story that doesn’t shout but simmers, drawing you into a transformation that feels as painful as it is inevitable. [...] Ekka may not rewrite gangster cinema, but it reshuffles the deck with meaning." India Today wrote "Ekka's first half is emotionally gripping and well-built further praising Director Rohit Padaki displays strong storytelling potential and actor Yuva Rajkumar shows marked improvement and leads strongly."

Susmita Sameera of The Times of India rated the film 2.5/5 stars and wrote, "Despite a strong ensemble, the film’s writing doesn’t always do justice to its characters or storyline. While each twist and character shows potential, the narrative often leans on familiar patterns, offering little that feels fresh or new." Swaroop Kodur of The News Minute wrote, "Despite its strong intent to tell an epic tale, the film leaves behind a murky picture that’s barely noticeable, and not enough to be remembered."

Vivek M. V. of The Hindu wrote, "The screenplay keeps going around in circles, promising a surprise at every turn but settling for low-hanging fruit. Themes of betrayal, vengeance, and transformation are dealt with superficially, with the antagonists nowhere close to being convincing." Sruthi Ganapathy Raman of The Hollywood Reporter India wrote, "Yuva Rajkumar’s film is a coming-of-age story of a gangster, which works when it's treated with emotion and not convention." Pranati A. S. of Deccan Herald gave the film 2/5 stars and wrote, "Many elements can make one feel disconnected from the occurrences in the film. [...] By the end of the film, you’re no longer curious to know what happens to the hero. Just like him, you want to go back home, and get some sleep."
