= Krishna Sarthak =

- Born: 4 July 1991 (age 35); Bangalore
- Years active: 2011–present
- Spouse: SupriyaSrinath (m. 2021)

Krishna Sarthak is a Kannada filmmaker and producer. He entered into movies business at 21 years as executive producer for the Kannada film Dyavre even before completing his engineering. He started his own film production company Krishna Creations and produced Dayavittu Gamanisi (2017) starring Vasishta N. Simha, Prakash Belawadi, and Raghu Mukherjee; it was nominated for the Filmfare Award for Best Film – Kannada at the 65th Filmfare Awards South. Premier Padmini starring Jaggesh, Madhoo, Sudharani, Pramod, Vivek Simha, and Hitha Chandrashekar released in April 2019.

== Filmography ==
Filmography
Year	Movie	Cast	Credit
2013	Dyavre	Yograj Bhat, Chethan Gandharva, Sonu Gowda	Producer
2017	Dayavittu Gamanisi	Raghu Mukherjee, Sukrutha Wagle, Bhavana Rao, Vasishta N. Simha, Samyukta Hornad, Sangeetha Bhat	Producer
2019	Premier Padmini	Jaggesh, Madhoo, Sudharani, Pramod	Executive producer
2020	Bairagee	Shiva Rajkumar, Dhananjay, Pruthvi Ambar, Shashikumar, Anjali	Producer
2022	Bheema	Duniya Vijay	Producer
2022	Sathyamangala	Shiva Rajkumar	Producer
2023	VK29	Duniya Vijay	Producer
