= Garuda Purana (film) =

Indian film

- Theatrical release poster
- Directed by: Manjunath B Nagba
- Screenplay by: Manjunath B Nagba
- Story by: Manjunath B Nagba
- Produced by: Sindhu K M
- Starring: Manjunath B Nagba; Santhosh Karki; Disha Shetty; Rajkumar Bhagawanth
- Cinematography: Suniel Narasimhamurthy
- Edited by: Manjunath B Nagba
- Music by: Rakesh Acharya
- Production company: 27 Frame's Creations
- Release date: 3 November 2023
- Country: India
- Language: Kannada

Garuda Purana is a 2023 Indian Kannada language crime thriller film written and directed by Manjunath B Nagba and produced by Sindhu K M, co-produced by BL Yogesh Kumar. The film stars Manjunath B Nagba, Santhosh Karki, and Disha Shetty in lead roles. The music of the film composed by Rakesh Acharya.

== Plot ==
The film revolves around a series of rapes and murders all over the State but the bodies which are found by the police don't match with the missing people and importantly there is no clue of the victims who went missing, hence, the Home Minister forms SIT to crack the case. On the other side, three happy going friends named three friends, accidentally meet a girl among them one boy starts a love with that girl where love episode starts and simultaneously the serial killings and rapes from border states continues. The rest is how the criminals get caught and how the three friends and girl unknowingly become involved in the crime.

== Cast ==
- Manjunath B Nagba
- Santhosh Karki
- Disha Shetty
- Chelluvaraj
- Kenchanna
- Rajkumar Bhagawanth

== Production ==
Director Manjunath B Nagba who previously worked as online editor for Kantara, Rathnan Prapancha, and Kabzaa makes his directorial debut. The movie teaser was released by Ashwini Puneeth Rajkumar and the trailer was released on Vijayadashami. The film was released on 3 November 2023 along with Bhavapurna "TRP Rama" and Basri Katte.

== Soundtrack ==
Rakesh Acharya has composed the songs. Punith Arya has penned the lyrics.

Track listing
No.	Title	Lyrics	Singer(s)	Length
1.	"Kudi Nota Salade"	Puneeth Arya	Rakesh Acharya, Vijetha	03:45
2.	"Tili Banalli"	Puneeth Arya	Rakesh Acharya	02:45
Total length:				05:09

== Reception ==
Y Maheswara Reddy of Bangalore Mirror rated three out of five and stated that "All in all, it is worth a watch for those who love suspense". A Sharadhaa of Cinema Express stated three out of five and wrote that "Garuda Purana might lack well-known faces, but it successfully engages the audience with a generous dose of entertainment through a talented ensemble of newcomers, making it a worthwhile one-time watch."
