= Mujib: The Making of a Nation (soundtrack) =

Soundtrack album by Shantanu Moitra
- Released: 13 October 2023
- Recorded: 2020–2022
- Studio: Prasad Kahe, Kolkata; Wow & Flutter, Mumbai; Soundideaz, Mumbai
- Genre: Feature film soundtrack
- Length: 18:21
- Language: Bengali; Hindi
- Label: Panorama Music

Shantanu Moitra chronology
Lost (2023)	Mujib: The Making of a Nation (2023)	12th Fail (2023)

Mujib: The Making of a Nation is the soundtrack album composed by Shantanu Moitra for the 2023 epic biographical film directed by Shyam Benegal based on the life of Sheikh Mujibur Rahman, the founding father and first president of Bangladesh. The album consisted of traditional Bengali songs as heard in the film, which was also composed in Hindi with the adapted lyrics written by Atul Tiwari. The album was released on 13 October 2023 through Panorama Music.

== Development ==
The film score and soundtrack were composed by Shantanu Moitra after associating with Benegal on Welcome to Sajjanpur (2008) and Well Done Abba (2010). While discussing with Benegal, Moitra recalled that Mujibur Rahman was a larger-than-life figure in history, and had to compose for the man's intention, that he was a family man and both a political leader. Moitra briefed the basic story as "primarily a father's story about the father and daughter and son and how he loved the shadharon manush (general public)." He further added that he added to watch the film 50 times for inspiration while producing the background music. Moitra added that the score had to follow the screenplay and the character, and appreciated Benegal's intention to portray larger-than-life characters in a simplistic manner, and utilized in a simplistic manner through the score.

In 2021, the production team contacted Zahid Akbar to write lyrics for one of the songs for the film, named as "Ochin Majhi" (lit. 'The mysterious boatman'). Moitra described the song as a tribute to his father who left to India during the partition in 1947. While composing the song, he recalled the stories told by his father in his childhood about the imageries of Bangladesh during partition, which he created in his mind and the brief Benegal told him was being the song serving tribute to the love of the land. While composing the song, it worked with Rahman, because "this is the land that he loved and fought for". It was one of the two original compositions he worked on for the film, while the rest of the music were adapted versions of traditional Bangla poems, and other song "Marsiya" was recorded by Shreya Ghoshal. Moitra refrained using modern instruments to replicate the periodic nature of the film. The song "Marsiya" was composed without any instruments and recorded with a cappella which Ghoshal being impressed upon recording. Moitra adapted the tune for the national anthem of Bangladesh, "Amar Sonar Bangla" written by Rabindranath Tagore, for this film.

The climatic sequence featured a song as per Benegal's suggestion, which Moitra found it to be challenging. "He had shot the sequence first and wanted me to compose it in such a way, that the words would fall on the shots of the bodies, and when the camera comes to Bangabandhu, that is when the words match. So, I had to work backward. I was told to create a melody so powerful that it does not require any music. If you see the sequence, in two-thirds of it, Shreya Ghoshal sings in silence, with no music – and that is what hits you! It's a dramatic sequence, you are seeing someone that you love, his blood splattered. Any music would have killed it. I did fight with him, I said it would be difficult, but he had the clarity."

== Reception ==
Rajib Kanti Roy of Daily Sun wrote: "The background music with traditional folk flavour, coupled with the regional dialects of southern Bangladesh, brings characters closer to the hearts of the audience. In this case, music director Shantanu Moitra and Bengali dialogue writers Anam Biswas, Gias Uddin Selim, Shihab Shaheen and Sadhana Ahmed have done the magic. The use of film scores in “Mujib: The Making of a Nation” is really impressive. The signature song “Ochin Majhi” sets the tone in the beginning, while the wedding song “Ki Ki Jinish Enecho Dulal” showcases the rich variety of Bangla folk music. However, the last song with no music against the backdrop of the 15 August brutality could have generated more emotion." Vinta Nanda of Daily Eye wrote: "The music score by Shantanu Moitra is spellbinding, it blends seamlessly to the narrative". Somashis Gupta of East India Story wrote "Shantanu Moitra's music, drawing from the rich folk traditions of Bengal, is a highlight of the film. Songs like “Ki Ki Jinish Enecho Dulal,” “Ochin Majhi,” and “Sajo Sundari Koinya” are culturally resonant enriching the overall experience." Sujay BM of Deccan Herald wrote "Shantanu Moitra's music provides the narrative with the necessary impetus at critical junctures." Poorna Bannerjee of The Times of India wrote "Music by Shantanu Moitra draws from the rich folk roots of Bengal and Ki Ki Jinish Enecho Dulal (Banna in Hindi), Ochin Majhi (Abujh Majhi in Hindi) and Sajo Sundari Koinya (Sundar Sajaniya in Hindi) are all quite hummable." Lipika Varma of The Free Press Journal wrote "Music had no scope so whatever classical music presented is soothing enough to our ears."

== Track listing ==
=== Bengali ===
No.	Title	Lyrics	Singer(s)	Length
1.	"Ochin Majhi"	Zahid Akbar	Rathijit Bhattacharjee	4:57
2.	"Ki Ki Jinish Enecho Dulal"	Traditional	Urmi Chowdhury	2:44
3.	"Pube te Uthilo Bhanu"	Traditional	Niranjan Haldar	2:19
4.	"Sajo Sundori Koinya"	Traditional	Urmi Chowdhury	2:33
5.	"Marsiya"	Shantanu Moitra	Shreya Ghoshal	3:27
6.	"Amar Sonar Bangla"	Rabindranath Tagore	Riza Dev, Saptaparni Bose, Trisha Das, Abhishruti Mukherjee, Sristita Singha, Smriti Majumder, Soumyabrata Banerjee, Soumyadipta Mukherjee, Aryak Chatterjee, Ritwik Paul, Suman Das and Debashish Vaidya	2:18
Total length:				18:21

=== Hindi ===
No.	Title	Lyrics	Singer(s)	Length
1.	"Abujh Majhi"	Atul Tiwari	Shaan	4:55
2.	"Banna"	Atul Tiwari	Supriyaa Paathak	2:44
3.	"Brotochari"	Atul Tiwari	Rituraj Mohanty	2:19
4.	"Sundar Sajaniya"	Atul Tiwari	Supriyaa Paathak	2:33
5.	"Marsiya"	Atul Tiwari	Shreya Ghoshal	3:25
6.	"Amar Sonar Bangla"	Rabindranath Tagore	Riza Dev, Saptaparni Bose, Trisha Das, Abhishruti Mukherjee, Sristita Singha, Smriti Majumder, Soumyabrata Banerjee, Soumyadipta Mukherjee, Aryak Chatterjee, Ritwik Paul, Suman Das and Debashish Vaidya	2:18
Total length:				18:16
