= List of Kannada films of the 2020s =

The following are lists of Kannada feature films released in the 2020s.

- List of Kannada films of 2020
- List of Kannada films of 2021
- List of Kannada films of 2022
- List of Kannada films of 2023
- List of Kannada films of 2024
- List of Kannada films of 2025
- List of Kannada films of 2026
