= Gurudev Hoysala =

Indian Kannada-language film

- Official poster
- Directed by: Vijay Naagendra
- Written by: Vijay Naagendra
- Produced by: Karthik Gowda; Yogi G Raj
- Starring: Dhananjaya; Amrutha Iyengar; Naveen Shankar; B. S. Avinash; Achyuth Kumar; Anirudh Bhat
- Cinematography: Karthik S.
- Edited by: Deepu S. Kumar
- Music by: B. Ajaneesh Loknath
- Production company: KRG Studios
- Release date: 30 March 2023
- Country: India
- Language: Kannada

Gurudev Hoysala is a 2023 Indian Kannada-language action thriller film written and directed by Vijay Naagendra, and produced by Karthik Gowda and Yogi G Raj under the banner KRG Studios. It stars Dhananjaya, Amrutha Iyengar, B. S. Avinash, Achyuth Kumar, Naveen Shankar, Anirudh Bhat, Mayuri Nataraj and Rajesh Nataranga. B. Ajaneesh Loknath composed the soundtrack and background score, while the cinematography is done by Karthik. S. The film marks Dhananjaya's 25th film as an actor. The film opened to positive reviews from critics.

== Plot ==
Inspector Gurudev Hoysala is transferred to Athani, Belagavi, where he is assigned by his superiors to find SI Bhargav, who was investigating about the sand mafia. Meanwhile, Hoysala arranges an inter-caste marriage between an upper-caste girl Bhoomi and her lower-caste boyfriend Ravi, after believing that they are orphans and are in love with each other. Things take a turn for Hoysala as he finds that Bhoomi is the daughter of a landlord named Daada. With this, Hoysala begins to trace Ravi and Bhoomi, where he learns from Ravi's friend Macche that Ravi actually didn't love Bhoomi, but only used her as a pawn to seek revenge against Daada for insulting their community.

Daada's henchman Bali also learn about this from ASI Sampath where he finds Ravi in a cattle fair, but Ravi escapes after Hoysala battles with Bali to capture Ravi. Hoysala finally finds Ravi and Bhoomi, where Ravi reveals that he wanted to avenge the humiliation by helping Bhargav to fetch evidence of Daada's involvement in sand mafia, but gave up his enmity with Daada after he realized Bhoomi's love for him. Bali tries to finish Ravi, but Hoysala defeats and arrests him. Ravi and Bhoomi are safely sent to their hometown by city commissioner Prakash.

Meanwhile, Hoysala learns that Bali is behind Bhargav's death after he harmed his friend and Daada's son Nana. The police find Bhargav's body and they give him a proper funeral. Hoysala finds that Ravi has died, where he confronts Prakash and finds that Daada and Nana assaulted Ravi and Bhoomi after Prakash left them, believing that Daada has forgiven them. While Ravi died, Bhoomi survived and was pregnant with Ravi's child. Daada and Nana learn about this and sends Nana to attack the police station where Bhoomi is kept. After being informed of their plan by a reformed Sampath, Hoysala arrives in nick of time and kills Nana in an encounter.

Enraged, Daada brings Bali out of prison. Bali starts targeting the police officials working for Hoysala, which leads Hoysala to organize a strike, thus creating chaos without any police present at the city. With the public demanding justice for Ravi's death, Hoysala finally receives the arrest warrant against Daada, but Prakash is killed before the court hearing and Daada is released. Despite this, Hoysala forms a plan to finish Dada, where he creates communal riots outside the court premises and finally kills Daada and knocks out Bali, thus providing justice to Ravi's death. After this, Hoysala and his team are suspended for their unsuccessful attempt at stopping the riots causing property damage.

== Cast ==
- Dhananjaya as SI Gurudev Hoysala
- Amrutha Iyengar as Ganga
- B. S. Avinash as Daada
- Achyuth Kumar as ASI Sampath
- Naveen Shankar as Bali
- Prathap Narayanan as Nana
- Anirudh Bhat as Ravi
- Mayuri Nataraj as Bhoomi
- Rajesh Nataranga as city commissioner Prakash
- Hemanth Sushil as Macche

== Soundtrack ==
The music is composed by B. Ajaneesh Loknath.

Track listing
No.	Title	Lyrics	Singer(s)	Length
1.	"Sala Sala Sala"	Santhosh Ananddram	Nakash Aziz
2.	"Byarene Aithi"	Yogaraj Bhat	B. Ajaneesh Lokanath
4.	"Arre Idu Entha Bhavane"	Yogaraj Bhat	Haricharan

== Release ==
The film was released on 30 March 2023.

=== Home media ===
The satellite and digital rights of the film were sold to Star Suvarna and Amazon Prime Video.

== Reception ==
=== Critical response ===
Sridevi S of The Times of India gave 3.5 out of 5 stars and wrote "Hoysala is a worthy addition to the cop genre movies of Sandalwood and can be enjoyed with some popcorn in theatres, more than once." Swaroop Kodur of OTTplay gave 3.5 out of 5 stars and wrote "Dhananjaya and Naveen Shankar shine in this engaging action drama. Ajaneesh Loknath's score is a good fit for the world of Gurudev Hoysala, and the three songs that feature in the 2-hour-16-minute runtime are nice. Karthik S, the cinematographer is proficient but I would have liked for the film to boast a unique visual palette of its own."

Latha Srinivasan of India Today gave 3 out of 5 stars and wrote "Gurudev Hoysala is said to be based on a true story, but it is a normal cop story. There are elements that could have been added to give the audience some unexpected surprises. The production values are good and the music by Ajaneesh Loknath is apt for this film. All in all, this Dhananjaya film is a good weekend watch that brings the cop action flick back into the limelight in Kannada cinema." Shuklaji of The News Minute gave 3 out of 5 stars and wrote "As a big screen experience, Gurudev Hoysala boasts many exciting and intriguing moments that make the visit to a cinema hall a worthwhile one. The music, the cinematography, and the editing could have been a lot better and more enterprising, but the focused storytelling suffices just enough."

A. Sharaadha of Cinema Express gave 3.5 out of 5 stars and wrote "Vijay N, who last directed the romantic drama Geetha, takes up a hard-hitting subject that raises some important issues. However, the story meanders a bit, and there are unnecessary scenes fitted into the narrative. Though the film ends on a bright note, the climax could have been more convincing. Gurudev Hoysala, a cop drama is relevant, compelling, and will spark conversation."
