= Aatagara =

2015 Indian Kannada mystery thriller film

- Film poster
- Directed by: K. M. Chaitanya
- Screenplay by: K. M. Chaitanya; Kannan Parameshwaran
- Dialogues by: Rohit Padaki
- Story by: Kannan Parameshwaran
- Produced by: Dwarakish; Yogish Dwarakish
- Starring: Chiranjeevi Sarja; Meghana Raj; Parul Yadav; Anant Nag; Anu Prabhakar; Achyuth Kumar; Dwarakish; Prakash Belawadi
- Cinematography: Satya Hegde
- Edited by: P. Haridoss
- Music by: Anoop Seelin
- Production company: Dwarakish Chitra
- Release date: 28 August 2015
- Country: India
- Language: Kannada

Aatagara (transl. Player) is a 2015 Indian Kannada-language Mystery Thriller film directed by K. M. Chaitanya and produced by Dwarakish and Yogish Dwarakish under Dwarakish Chitra. The film, which is based on Agatha Christie's novel And Then There Were None, features an ensemble cast of Chiranjeevi Sarja, Meghana Raj, Parul Yadav, Anu Prabhakar, Achyuth Kumar, Prakash Belawadi, Balaji Manohar, Pavana Gowda, Sadhu Kokila and Aarohitha Gowda, while Ananth Nag, P. Ravi Shankar, Dwarakish, Rohit Padaki and RJ Nethra appear in key supporting roles. The music was composed by Anoop Seelin, while the cinematography and editing were handled by Satya Hegde and P. Haridoss.

Aatagara was released on 28 August 2015 to positive reviews from critics and became a commercial success at the box office. The trio of Yogish Dwarakish – K. M. Chaitanya – Chiranjeevi Sarja went on to collaborate in Aake and Amma I Love You.

== Plot ==
Mrutyunjay alias Jay, a local drug dealer, loses costly drugs which leads his boss to threaten Jay to return the amount for the lost drugs or face death. Without any choice to make money, Jay gets into a reality show called Aaatagara, hoping to win the prize money to return to his boss. He learns that his crush Sakshi, a famous model, is also a participant in the same show. Many people like Malika, an actress; Sandhya, a school principal; Sadhu Maharaj, a famous chef; Yashwanth, a journalist, Yashwanth; Dr. Chetan Bhagwat; Anu, a wildlife worker; Kannan "KP" Param, a model photographer and a common woman Bhavana are participants in the show.

The instructions of the reality show are that the contenstants will reach an island and no one can get off the island as there are no means of transportation until the end of the show. There is a room in which groceries used for cooking are kept and only Sadhu is allowed in the room. A service room is also available, but nobody is allowed in the service room. After arriving at the island and also at the house, they see a ten-headed Ravana statue at the house. The next day on the island, Anu, Sadhu, Yashwanth and Bhavana are mysteriously killed. A telephone and television are available in the house, but they are not working. Suddenly, the television starts playing the Aatagara show; everyone gets shocked after learning that the participants mentioned by the host of the channel are all different from those who are there on this island.

Later, the contestants receive a phone call from a mysterious caller, telling that all of them were lured on the island to die. They also find out that as each one of them dies, one of the Ravana's heads will be cut off. The contestants sees the Ravana statue which contains only six heads, implying that Jay, Sakshi, Mallika, KP, Chetan and Sandhya will be the next persons to die. The family members of the participants are tensed after seeing the show, where they file a case against the TV channel hosting the show. The police department assigns Inspector Ravi Gowda and SI Rohit begins to investigate the case.

On the island, everyone falls asleep. Later, Jay wakes up and finds that Chetan has left the house. Jay follows Chetan and loses track of him, where he hears gunshots and suspects Chetan as the killer. Jay runs back to the house and convinces everyone that Chetan is the killer. They search Chetan's suitcase to check if they can find a gun to break open the control room to communicate with the channel host. They find a gun and break open the lock of the control room, where a judge meets them through a live webcam that the contestants have committed crimes, but have escaped from the law by showing false evidences that they were innocent.

Jay had killed the judge's grandson by supplying drugs to him. Sakshi had intentionally killed a small boy by drowning him for being in love with his father. A teacher in Sandhya' school had assaulted a six-year-old girlchild. To save the reputation of the school, Sandhya used Yashwanth to turn the case against the father of the girl and made it looked as if he was the culprit, which led the father to commit suicide. KP had seduced Nirosha, a model, for his own good. Realizing that Nirosha was of no use to him, KP said he did not love her, causing Nirosha to lose her sanity. Mallika got drunk at the party and was driving a car for fun, but she mistakenly killed an old couple. Mallika, in order to escape, framed her driver for the accident.

The judge also reveals that he has sent a spy on the island to kill them. After the webcam switches off, everyone is convinced that Chetan is the spy. KP, Malika and Sandhya are killed. At the same time, Inspector Ravi receives a letter from the judge, showing proof that the contestants sent to the island had committed crimes earlier. Ravi soon heads to the island, despite the judge telling him that none of them will be alive even if the police ends up finding them. Jay and Sakshi go in search of Chetan to kill him as the judge had said that if they would kill the spy, they will have a chance to escape from the island. However, they find Chetan dead and they start doubting each other. Sakshi shoots Jay, assuming him as the spy, but she realizes her mistake after learning that Jay actually loves her. Later, Sakshi sees hallucinations of the boy and shoots herself out of guilt, which leaves Jay distraught at her death.

Later, it is revealed that the spy is actually Anu, who had faked her death. Anu leaves the island before the police arrive. The police arrive at the island and the police take him to the hospital. Ravi, seeing that the judge's intention was good, closes the case. Jay is revealed to be alive, where Ravi helps him to start a new life of making cotton candies. In the end, the judge and the family members, consisting of the show's anchor Usha, Anu, TV channel owner and Ravi, joins a laughing club and they laugh happily as they had finally received justice.

== Cast ==
- Chiranjeevi Sarja as Mrutyunjay alias Jai, a drug peddler
- Meghana Raj as Sakshi, a supermodel
- Parul Yadav as Mallika, an actress
- Anu Prabhakar as Sandhya Ramagopal, a school principal
- Sadhu Kokila as Sadhu Maharaj, a chef
- Achyuth Kumar as Yashwanth, a journalist
- Prakash Belawadi as Dr. Chetan Bhagawat
- Paavana Gowda as Anu
- Balaji Manohar as Kannan "KP" Param, a fashion photographer
- Arohitha Gowda as Bhavana
- P. Ravi Shankar as Inspector Ravi Gowda
- Rohit Padaki as SI Rohit
- Rishi as Siddharth Mayya
- Veena Sundar as Hema Bhagawat, Dr. Chetan Bhagawat's wife
- RJ Nethra as Usha, a TV Host
- Anant Nag as a former judge
- Muni
- Kari Subbu
- Sundar Raj
- Babu Hirannayya
- Raghavendra. M. Singatagere
- Sujith Soman
- Shishir
- Chandradhar
- Urmila Biswas
- Niharika
- Uma Hebbar
- Dwarakish

== Soundtrack ==
The soundtrack was composed by Anoop Seelin. Anoop Seelin composed a total of 4 songs, but the filmmakers reportedly dropped out a song to not affect the film's pace. The team reportedly came up with a riddle song, which celebrated the legendary artists of Kannada cinema.

=== Track listing ===
No.	Title	Lyrics	Singer(s)	Length
1.	"Aatagara"	Rohit Padaki	Shashank Sheshagiri
2.	"Tharamayya"	Rohit Padaki	Santhosh Venky, Supriya Lohith
3.	"Arooralli Uliyoryaaru"	Rohit Padaki	Archana Udupa, Anoop Seelin

== Reception ==
=== Critical response ===
Sunayana Suresh of The Times of India gave 4/5 stars and wrote "This film shines in all departments, right from the scripting to the casting and the production values. The twists in the plot are succinct and there isn't one dull moment for the viewer." N. Veena of Filmibeat gave 4/5 stars and wrote "After Aa Dinagalu, KM Chiatanya is back with yet another revolutionary script. Aatagara is just not a thriller, but ends with a striking social message to the viewers." Shyam Prasad S of Bangalore Mirror gave 4/5 stars and wrote "Aatagara should give confidence to many filmmakers to come up with more such originals." Shashiprasad S M of Deccan Chronicle gave 3.5/5 stars and wrote "A highly recommended one for a thrilling experience." Y. Maheshwara Reddy of DNA gave 3/5 stars and wrote "It may not be an exaggeration to say that it has all ingredients to ensure value for your money and time."

== Controversy ==
Aatagara was accused as a remake of 2011 Tamil film Aduthathu directed by Thakkali Srinivasan. However, K. M. Chaitanya cleared the air saying that both the films were based on Agatha Christie's novel And Then There Were None, which was about ten characters stranded on an uninhabited island. He also claimed that while some characters – Meghana Raj, Sadhu Kokila and Prakash Belwadi were directly based on the characters from the novel, while the characters of Anu Prabhakar, Achyuth Kumar and Parul Yadav – were based on real-life incidents.

However, questions were raised to similarity between the sudden introduction of the mastermind in the basement of the secret room in Kannada and Tamil versions in spite of the character being anonymous and not making an appearance in the novel. The similarities were also found in the reality-show backdrop, ten faces of Ravana, characterisation of the investigating officer and the traitor among the reality-show participants (none of which were found in the novel). It was also argued that instead of ten faces of Raavana, the team could have tweaked it to Dashavatar with metaphoric reference, but did not do so as it was straight away taken from Aduthathu. At this point of time, the team of Aatagara arranged a special screening for Srinivasan in Bangalore.

Srinivasan clarified that the film is not a remake of Aduthathu and also praised Aatagara as an extremely well-made film. Srinivasan also revealed that he had made a serial inspired from And Then There Were None in 1995 and also made Aduthathu inspired by the same. For the film and serial, Kannan Parameshwaran, who co-wrote the script and story for Aatagara, had worked on the story inspired by the same novel. Srinivasan also said that anything similar is actually to the novel and not his film. He also said anyone saying the film a remake were ignorant and calling this film a remake is "an absolute joke".
