= Geetha Bangle Store =

- Theatrical release poster
- Directed by: Manju Mitra
- Written by: Manju Mitra
- Produced by: C Kemparaju
- Starring: Pramod Panju; Sushmita
- Cinematography: Cinetech Soori
- Edited by: K M Prakash
- Music by: V. Manohar
- Production company: Jathin Cinemas
- Release date: 11 September 2015
- Running time: 162 minutes
- Country: India
- Language: Kannada

Geetha Bangle Store is a 2015 Indian Kannada-language romantic drama film directed by Manju Mitra and starring Pramod Panju and Sushmita.

== Cast ==
- Pramod Panju as Veerabhadra alias Veeru
- Sushmita as Geetha
- Bhavya
- Mandya Ramesh
- Vinaya Prasad
- Achyuth Kumar
- Veena Sundar
- Different Danny
- Kari Subbu
- Mata Guruprasad
- Nallur Prasad
- B M Giriraj
- V. Manohar

== Soundtrack ==
The soundtrack was composed by V. Manohar.

Geetha Bangle Store

Soundtrack album by V. Manohar
- Released: 2015
- Genre: Feature film soundtrack
- Length: 27:29
- Language: Kannada
- Label: Lahari Music

V. Manohar chronology
Oriyan Thoonda Oriyagapuji (2015)	Geetha Bangle Store (2015)	Vamshodharaka (2015)
External audio
- Geetha Bangle Store – Jukebox on YouTube

Track listing
No.	Title	Lyrics	Singer(s)	Length
1.	"En Sambhavam"	V. Manohar	Rajesh Krishnan	1:38
2.	"Swalpa Talu Prayave"	Manju Mitra	Anuradha Bhat	4:58
3.	"Hupuduga"	Manju Mitra	Vani Harikrishna, Naveen Sajju	5:57
4.	"Balegara Beladanu"	R Mahadevanayak	Hemanth	4:08
5.	"Hedi Aadanin"	V. Manohar	Chaitra	1:40
6.	"Ale Ale Aleyoo"	Doddarangegowda	Chintan Vikas	3:29
7.	"Swagatha Koruve Prayave"	Manju Mitra	Anuradha Bhat	4:51
8.	"Kanna Tumba Kansubeku"	Manju Mitra	Vani Harikrishna	0:48
Total length:				27:29

== Reception ==
A critic from The Times of India rated the film 2 1/2 out of 5 stars and wrote that "What could have been the underdog champion of the year ends up just short of the finish line, as the director falls prey to commercial elements that he deemed mandatory". A critic from Deccan Herald wrote that "The result, Geetha Bangle Store, nicely performed by ensemble cast, including debutant pair, embellished by evocative and enchanting cinematography by Cinetech Suri, which captures the hinterlands in its verdant, vibrant hues, and V Manohar’s catchy music, which lend special lustre and luminescence, makes for must watch movie, despite its length". A critic from The New Indian Express wrote that "The film which is 162 minutes long comes with a lot of scope for romance, suspense and action which translates successfully on to screen. The film’s lush background captured by cinematographer Cinetech Soori makes the film visually charming and lends poignancy to the ill-fated love story. V Manohar’s music is melodious. The result is a Kannada film which is a fragrant with native innocence". A critic from Vijaya Karnataka rated the film 3 1/2 out of 5 stars and wrote that "The duration of the film is 162 minutes. KM to experiment with more cutting for post-interval scenes. Prakash could have tried. Keeping such minor flaws aside, this is a first-class film that is worthy of class and mass".
