= Parameshwar Hegde =

Indian Classical Singer

Pandit Parameshwar Hegde
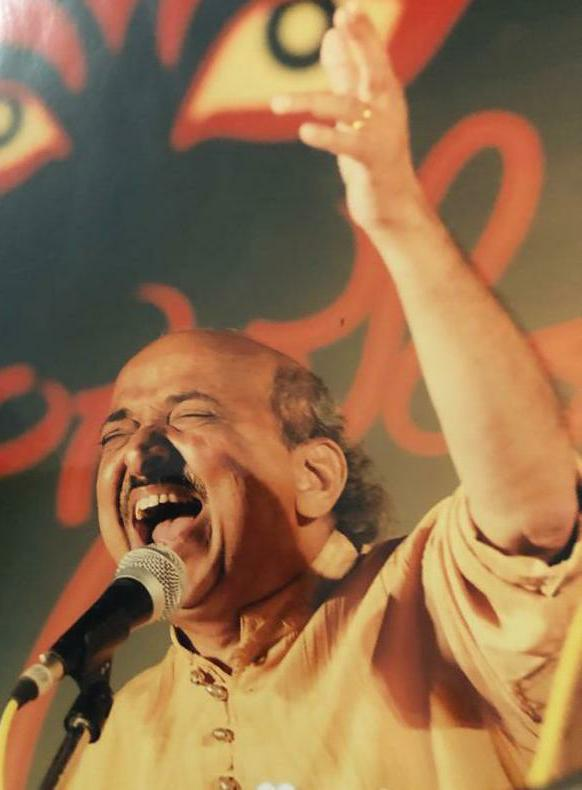
- Pandit Parameshwar Hegde performing at 'Bengaluru Habba' live concert
- Born: Parameshwar Hegde; 6 May 1956 (age 69); Honnavar, Uttara Kannada, Karnataka, India
- Occupation: Hindustani classical singer
- Spouse: Lalitha Hegde (m. 1979)
- Children: 2
- Musical career
- Genres: Hindustani classical music
- Instrument: Vocal
- Years active: 1966–present
- Website: http://parameshwarhegdesangeethacademy.in/

Pandit Parameshwar Hegde (born 6 May 1956) is an Indian Hindustani classical vocalist. He belongs to the Kirana, Gwalior and Patiala gharanas

== Early life and music training ==
Born to Shri Govinda Hegde and Ganapamma Hegde in Uttara Kannada district of Karanataka, Pandit Parameshwar Hegde was drawn into music at young age. Under the influence of his father late Shri Govinda Hegde, he started learning Hindustani music when he was ten years old. Soon, under the guidance of Sri.S.M.Bhat and Pandit Chandrashekar Puranika Math, he further pursued learning Hindustani Classical music.

In 1976, Parameshwar Hegde went to Dharwad to seek advanced training under Pandit Basavaraj Rajguru.

== Personal life ==
Pandit Parameshwar Hegde is married to Smt. Lalitha Hegde, a singer herself, who is the daughter of Yakshagana artist and musician, late Dr.Mahabala Hegde Keremane. They have two daughters, Veena and Vani.

== Career ==
In his early music career days, Pandit Parameshwar Hegde was a rank holder in the Visharad exam conducted by the Gandharva Mahavidyalaya and a first rank holder in Vidwath exam conducted by the Government of Karnataka. Being an ‘A Top’ grade artist on All India Radio, he has been featured in several national broadcasts. He has performed with the world renowned musician Pandit Vishwamohan Bhatt in a couple of Jugalbandi concerts. He has performed in music festivals like 'Basava Jayanthi Utsav', 'Impu', Hampi Utsav, 'Sawai Gandharv Bhimsen Mahotsav' and has also performed in India, US, Canada, United Kingdom and the Gulf countries.

=== Music academy and trust ===
‘Parameshwar Hegde Sangeeth Academy’ is a music academy started by Pandit Parameshwar Hegde. He has trained hundreds of students at the Academy and Many are now independent artistes, performing for connoisseurs across India.

Under this academy, ‘Raag Anuraag’ series was launched and orchestrated by Pandit Parmeshwar Hegde. ‘Raag Anuraag’ is the collection of short introductions of the wide range of ragas in Hindustani classical music to the unassuming public audience. ‘Raag Anuraag’ has been conducted from several years, the very recent being performed by the third-generation artists.

Pandit Parameshwar Hegde founded 'Rajguru Smruti’, a trust in the fond memory of his Late guru Pandit Basavaraj Rajguru. Every year a number of programs are conducted by the trust, with an intention to promote the art form to Bangaloreans.

Rajguru Smruti conducts three annual programs under its auspices:

- ‘Sangeeth Samaroh’ which is a musical concert where a medley of artists are invited to perform. Veteran and young, hailing from different parts of the country, carrying the scent of different gharanas – various artists perform this concert, which is one of the most popular programs conducted by the trust.
- ‘Parampara’ embodies the concept of Guru-Shishya tradition. An artist and his/her two disciples perform in this event – highly accomplished artists have performed with their disciples so far in this unique concert.
- ‘Sur Prabhat’ This is an early morning concert conducted in the bucolic environs of Chitra Kala Parishat, where popular national/international level artists are invited to perform in the open auditorium at the early hours of morning – a program solely dedicated the celebration of morning ragas. Few notable artists who have performed are Shubha Mudgal, Pandit Ronu Manjumdar, Ruchira Kedar, Pandit Rajan & Sajan Mishra.

=== Music compositions and Audio releases ===
Pandit Parameshwar Hegde has composed music for several movies and music albums. He has directed music for ‘Puttana Prapancha’, a Kannada short film, ‘Saacha’(2011), a Kannada movie, ‘Manasaagide’ (2016), a Kannada music album and has also rendered his voice for Kannada songs like ‘Henthana Endigu’ in ‘Kiladi’(2000) and ‘Kandu Kandu’ in ‘Dayavittu Gamanisi’(2017) to name a few.

=== Music Teaching ===
Each month, Pandit Parameshwar Hegde organizes a baithak where a few students are provided an opportunity to perform followed by his rendition. which involves discussion and feedback that adds to the student's repertoire.

There is also the annual ‘Guru Poornima’ celebration that completed 25 years in 2017. It spans over two full days, all the students of Hegde perform to pay a musical tribute to their guru. Many of his students are popular concert artistes as well as sought after gurus.

His notable students include Vasundhara Das and Bharath B. J..

== Awards and recognitions ==
- Guru Kripa Award from Shankar Mahadevan Academy - 2019
- Karnataka Kalashri - 2017
- Rajyotsava Award by Karnataka Govt - 2004
