= Halka Don =

- Promotional poster
- Directed by: Chala
- Written by: Chala
- Produced by: K. P. Sreekanth
- Starring: Pramod Panju; Amrutha Iyengar; Sai Kumar
- Cinematography: Satya Hegde
- Edited by: Arjun Kittu
- Music by: V. Harikrishna
- Production company: Venus Enterrtainers
- Country: India
- Languages: Kannada; Telugu

Halka Don is an upcoming Indian Kannada‑Telugu bilingual action comedy film written and directed by Chala, and produced under the Venus Enterrtainers banner by K.P. Sreekanth. The film stars Pramod Panju and Amrutha Iyengar in the lead roles, alongside Sai Kumar, Jyothi Poorvaj, and Ramesh Indira in pivotal supporting roles.

The cinematography is handled by Satya Hegde, the editing by Arjun Kittu, and music is composed by V. Harikrishna. The official title teaser was released on October 24, 2025, via D Beats’ YouTube channel. The film is set for theatrical release, simultaneously in Kannada and Telugu.

== Premises ==
The film follows Don (Pramod Panju), a charismatic but unsuspecting protagonist who gets embroiled in local underworld rivalries when he unwittingly becomes the face of a powerful gang. Forced into a frenzy of face‑offs and comedic chaos, Don must rely on his street smarts, unexpected alliances, and a key accomplice—Amrutha's character—to outwit rival dons and reclaim his peace.

== Cast ==
- Pramod Panju as Don
- Amrutha Iyengar
- Sai Kumar
- Ramesh Indira
- Jyothi Poorvaj

== Production ==
=== Development ===
Following a successful collaboration on previous mass‑action films, the team of Chala and K. P. Sreekanth conceived Halka Don as a bilingual entertainer designed for pan‑South appeal. With Sai Kumar in a major role marking his 50th year in cinema, the project aimed to merge nostalgia and novelty. The script blends underworld action with broad comedy, targeting New Year audiences.

=== Marketing ===
The project launched with a star-studded muhurat event featuring Shivarajkumar, Sudeepa, Duniya Vijay, Vinay Rajkumar, R. Chandru and Rachita Ram, generating buzz through widespread Kannada media coverage on October 24, 2025. The title teaser released on October 24, 2025, by D Beats Music, showcased the first look and character reveal, highlighting V. Harikrishna's music score and a stylized tone aimed at attracting broad audiences.

== Music ==
V. Harikrishna has composed the score and soundtrack for the film.

Track listing
No.	Title	Length

== Release ==
The film is set for a January 14, 2026 theatrical release, simultaneously in Kannada and Telugu.
