= Yogi G. Raj =

Kannada film director, producer, and costume designer

- Occupations: Director, producer, costume designer
- Years active: 2015–present

Yogi G. Raj (born 11 June) is a Kannada film director, producer, and costume designer.

== Career ==
Yogi G. Raj made his debut as a director in the year 2015 with Khushi Khushiyagi and later directed Bangara S/O Bangarada Manushya in the year 2017.

In the year 2017 he partnered with Karthik Gowda at KRG Studios, a film production and distribution house and also the managing partner of KRG Connects film marketing company. He has worked as a costume designer for Kannada movies and had been a personal costumer designer for Puneeth Rajkumar.

== Filmography ==
=== As director ===
Year	Film	Notes
2015	Khushi Khushiyagi	
2017	Bangara s/o Bangarada Manushya	

=== As producer ===
Year	Film	Notes
2021	Rathnan Prapancha	
2023	Gurudev Hoysala	
2024	Powder	
2026	Mango Pachcha	
TBA	Uttarakaanda †	
