= Mango Pachcha =

2026 Kannada crime drama film

- Directed by: Viveka
- Written by: Viveka; Nagabhushan Deshpande
- Produced by: Priya Sudeep; Karthik R. Gowda; Yogi G. Raj
- Starring: Sanchith Sanjeev; Kaajal Kunder; Mayur Patel
- Cinematography: Shekar Chandra
- Edited by: Sharath V. Vashisht
- Music by: Charan Raj
- Production company: Supriyanvi Picture Studio
- Distributed by: KRG Studios
- Release date: 5 June 2026 (India)
- Running time: 95 minutes
- Country: India
- Language: Kannada

Mango Pachcha is a 2026 Indian Kannada-language crime drama action film written and directed by Viveka. Produced by Priya Sudeep, Karthik R. Gowda and Yogi G. Raj under the banners of Supriyanvi Picture Studio and KRG Studios, the film stars debutant Sanchith Sanjeev alongside Kaajal Kunder, Mayur Patel and Prashanth Hiremath in key supporting roles. The soundtrack and score is composed by Charan Raj while the cinematography is by Shekar Chandra and editing by Sharath Vashisht. Mango Pachcha Digitally Streaming from September 25 2026 in Kannada , Tamil , Telugu , Hindi and Malayalam on JioHotstar.

The film was released theatrically on 5 June 2026. Set in Mysuru between 2001 and 2011, it follows an ambitious young man whose pursuit of wealth and influence draws him into the city's criminal underworld.

== Plot ==
Set in Mysuru between 2001 and 2011, the film follows Prashanth, known as "Pachcha", a young man running a CD rental shop who lives quietly with his girlfriend, his mother, and his younger brother. When his father dies, Pachcha discovers the existence of a hidden first family, including a legal son named Nagappa. Behind the family's marigold farms lies a concealed marijuana trade, with connections reaching into local political circles. As Pachcha becomes entangled in the criminal underworld, he is forced to confront the consequences of the choices that shape his rise.

== Cast ==
- Sanchith Sanjeev as Prashanth "Pachcha"
- Kaajal Kunder as Sooji
- Mayur Patel as Nagappa
- Prashanth Hiremath
- Ugramm Manju
- Hamsa Narayanaswamy
- Harini Shreekanth
- Jai Gopinath as Shyam
- Bhavana

== Production ==
=== Development and casting ===
The film marked the lead acting debut of Sanchith Sanjeev, the nephew of Kannada actor Kichcha Sudeep. Sanjeev had previously trained in acting and filmmaking at the New York Film Academy and worked as an assistant director on Sudeep's film Maanikya before transitioning to acting. Kichcha Sudeep contributed guidance during the film's development and provided a voiceover.

=== Music ===
The soundtrack and background score were composed by Charan Raj, incorporating elements of independent and hip-hop music.

Track listing
No.	Title	Lyrics	Singer(s) and Artist(s)	Length
1.	"Hasaravva"	Viveka, Sharath Vashisht	Mohan Kumar, Charan Raj	3:37
2.	"Araginiye"	Dhananjay Rajan	Kapil Kapilan, Saanvi Sudeep	3:40
3.	"Kadak Maal"	Rahul Dit-O, MC Biju, Pavan Sadak, Nagarjun Sharma	Rahul Dit-O, MC Bijju, Pavan Sadak	3:57

== Release ==
The film was distributed by KRG Studios and released theatrically on 5 June 2026.

=== Box office ===
Mango Pachcha opened to a limited response across Karnataka, with modest reach in other states and negligible overseas collections.

== Reception ==
Mango Pachcha received mixed reviews from critics.

Writing for The Hindu, Vivek M. V. described the film as a "slick thriller" and praised director Viveka's approach of avoiding conventional commercial-film hero tropes. He also commended Sanchith Sanjeev's performance, describing the actor's debut as promising.

The Deccan Herald awarded the film 2.5 out of 5 stars. The review praised the film's premise and period setting but criticised its narrative execution, stating that it established its world with promise before losing focus in the latter half.

Critical responses generally highlighted the film's technical aspects, particularly Charan Raj's background score, cinematography, and Sanchith Sanjeev's screen presence. Several reviewers, however, criticised the film's character development and emotional depth, arguing that its brisk pacing limited the impact of the narrative.
