= KRG Studios =

Indian film production company

KRG Studios is an Indian film production and distribution company based in Bengaluru, India. It primarily deals with the production and distribution of Kannada-language and non-Kannada films across Karnataka.

== Background ==
KRG Studios established its distribution business in 2017 by Karthik Gowda with Yogi G Raj, having distributed over 100+ films in Karnataka to date. In 2020, KRG Studios ventured into full-fledged production, from conceptualization to creation of feature films and also launched the KRG Connects movie marketing unit in the same year.

== Film production ==
KRG Studios ventured into film production with Rathnan Prapancha, a film starring Dhananjay is an Indian Kannada-language comedy drama film written and directed by Rohit Padaki. The film stars Malayalam actress, Reba Monica John in her Kannada debut, Panju, Umashree, Ravishankar Gowda, Anu Prabhakar and others. It was released directly on the digital platform Amazon Prime Video on 22 October 2021. It received positive reviews from critics and audience and became a streaming blockbuster on Amazon Prime Video.

Following their success of Rathnan Prapancha, they produced Gurudev Hoysala in 2023, an action thriller film written and directed by Vijay Naagendra, starring Dhananjaya, Amrutha Iyengar, B. S. Avinash, Achyuth Kumar, Naveen Shankar, Anirudh Bhat, Mayuri Nataraj, Rajesh Nataranga and others. B. Ajaneesh Loknath composed the soundtrack and background score, while Karthik.S handled the cinematography. The film marks Dhananjaya's 25th film as an actor. Released on 30 March 2023, it opened to positive reviews and critical acclaim.

Uttarakaanda, has been announced as the next production venture by KRG Studios. Directed by Rohit Padaki, the film stars Dr.Shivarajkumar, Dhananjaya and Ramya as lead roles. It is one of the most anticipated Kannada cinema, especially because it marks the return of Sandalwood Queen Ramya. However, Ramya opted out of the film due to unavailability of dates. It was also reported that Atul Kulkarni was roped into play a role in the film. Bollywood music composer and singer Amit Trivedi will make his Kannada debut with Uttarakaanda, while cinematography will be handled by Advaitha Gurumurthy and art direction by Vishwas Kashyap. The team also held auditions for the supporting and other background actors in and around North Karnataka in March.

After filming began in April 2024, further cast details were revealed over the following days with their first look posters. Chaithra Achar who has showcased her talent in movies like Saptha Sagaradache Ello, Toby and Gilky was roped in to play Lacchi. Malayalam Filmmaker Vijay Babu was cast in the role of Torrino. Diganth to play Mallige, a character distinct from his previous roles. Director Yograj Bhat as Patil, while veteran and accomplished actors Rangayana Raghu and Gopal Krishna Deshpande were cast as Bande Kaaka and Dharma respectively. National award-winning actress Umashree was on boarded to play the role of Pandari Bai, this movie marks her second collaboration with the director and production team following their successful film Rathnan Prapancha. and finally Aishwarya Rajesh was announced as the female lead 'Durgi' owing to the vacancy as Ramya backing out of the project. The film marks her debut in Kannada cinema who has worked in various roles in the South Indian Films. It is also reported that actress Bhavana Menon is also included in the cast who would is said to be paired opposite Shivarajkumar who have proved to be a successful onscreen pair.

On the occasion of their 6th anniversary, KRG Studios announced their collaboration with TVF Motion Pictures in the arena of feature films with a specific focus on South Indian regional languages with the purpose of bringing interesting and fresh stories to young adults everywhere. The muhurtha of the film happened in Bangalore on 6 September 2023, where Kichcha Sudeep was the special guest at the event and slammed the clapboard for the first scene of the film, titled Powder. A comedy Kannada feature film, directed by the Janardhan Chikkanna and written by Deepak Venkateshan, the movie boasts a stellar cast including Diganth, Dhanya Ramkumar, Sharmiela Mandre, Anirudh Acharya, Rangayana Raghu, Ravishankar Gowda, Gopal Krishna Deshpande and others. The shooting commenced in Mysuru on 30 October 2023 and concluded with a second schedule in Bangalore on 14 March 2024. The film is slated to release in theatres on 12 July 2024.

Further, the production has announced their next film (5th production) on 25 June 2023, tilted Kirik'et 11. The movie marks the Kannada debut of director Suman Kumar, co-writer of the popular Hindi web series The Family Man and Farzi written by Manoj Kumar Kalvanan, the film revolves around cricket starring Danish Sait and Naveen Shankar in lead roles. The shooting of the film will commence shortly.

On the eve of superstar Kiccha Sudeep's birthday in 2023, the production team made an exciting announcement that they will be working with Sudeep for the very first time on a film titled KK (King Kichcha). The film marks the return of the actor to the director's chair after nearly a decade. The team has shared a title teaser that reveals the tagline "God Forgives, I don't" which suggests that Sudeep is ready to take on yet another actioner with KK, with him also playing the main lead.

The banner has also ventured into Tamil language films through collaborating with acclaimed filmmaker Anjali Menon and Malayalam through collaboration with Friday Film House.

As KRG expands its footprint to comprehensive film production, on February 20, 2024, the production announced its first collaboration with the filmmaker Anjali Menon for their next project tentatively title KRG07. Known for her works, Menon brings her storytelling to a Tamil feature film in partnership with KRG. This collaboration with Anjali Menon marks a pivotal moment for the company, focusing on bridging gaps in storytelling within the Kannada industry and beyond.

On 29 February 2024, Friday Film House and KRG Studios announced their collaboration to produce and distribute feature films. The collaboration will initially involve three feature films and will explore several other opportunities in distribution. The first feature titled Padakkalam, directed by Manu Swaraj will commence production soon.

== Films distributed ==
Key
†	Denotes films that have not yet been released

List of films distributed by KRG Studios
Year	Title	Language	Ref.
2017	Doddmane Hudga	Kannada	
2017	Operation Alamelamma	Kannada	
2017	Kataka	Kannada	
2017	Churikatte	Kannada	
2017	Tarak	Kannada	
2018	Rajaratha	Kannada	
2018	Nagarahavu	Kannada	
2018	8MM Bullet	Kannada	
2018	Idam Premam Jeevanam	Kannada	
2018	O Premave	Kannada	
2018	Days of Borapura	Kannada	
2018	6ne Maili	Kannada	
2018	Trunk	Kannada	
2018	Sankashtakara Ganapathi	Kannada	
2018	Onthara Bannagalu	Kannada	
2018	Ondalla Eradalla	Kannada	
2018	Naduve Antaravirali	Kannada	
2018	Bhairava Geetha	Kannada	
2018	NTR: Kathanayakudu	Telugu version	
2018	NTR: Mahanayakudu	Telugu version	
2019	Devaki	Kannada	
2019	Yaana	Kannada	
2019	Pailwaan	Kannada	
2019	Girmit	Kannada	
2019	Brahmachari	Kannada	
2019	Mundina Nildana	Kannada	
2019	Babru	Kannada	
2019	India vs England	Kannada	
2019	Missing Boy	Kannada	
2019	Panchatantra	Kannada	
2019	Ayushman Bhava	Kannada	
2019	Sri Bharatha Baahubali	Kannada	
2020	Dia	Kannada	
2020	Shivaji Surathkal	Kannada	
2020	Act 1978	Kannada	
2021	Badava Rascal	Kannada	
2021	Ramarjuna	Kannada	
2021	Mugilpete	Kannada	
2021	Garuda Gamana Vrishabha Vahana	Kannada	
2021	Ninna Sanihake	Kannada	
2021	Vakeel Saab	Telugu version	
2021	Paagal	Telugu version	
2021	Nootokka Jillala Andagadu	Telugu version	
2022	Love Mocktail 2	Kannada	
2022	Yellow Board	Kannada	
2022	777 Charlie	Kannada	
2022	Oke Oka Jeevitham	Telugu version	
2022	Bhala Thandanana	Telugu version	
2022	HIT: The Second Case	Telugu version	
2022	Twenty One Hours	Kannada	
2022	Kaaneyaadavara Bagge Prakatane	Kannada	
2022	Gargi	Kannada	
2022	Karmanye Vadhikaraste	Kannada	
2022	Aghora	Kannada	
2022	Sakutumba Sametha	Kannada	
2022	Ravi Bopanna	Kannada	
2022	Love 360	Kannada	
2022	Gandhada Gudi	Kannada	
2022	Saddu Vicharane Naditide	Kannada	
2022	Raana	Kannada	
2022	Raymo	Kannada	
2022	Triple Riding	Kannada	
2022	Padavi Poorva	Kannada	
2023	Dasara	Telugu and Kannada versions	
2023	Hondisi Bareyiri	Kannada	
2023	Gurudev Hoysala	Kannada	
2023	Shivaji Surathkal 2	Kannada	
2023	Daredevil Musthafa	Kannada	
2023	Siren	Kannada	
2023	Melody Drama	Kannada	
2023	Adipurush	Kannada, Telugu, Hindi Versions	
2023	Bengaluru Boys	Kannada	
2023	Aachar & Co	Kannada	
2023	Ustaad	Telugu Version	
2023	Kshetrapati	Kannada	
2023	Tatsama Tadbhava	Kannada	
2023	Baanadariyalli	Kannada	
2023	Chikku	Kannada and Tamil Versions	
2023	12th Fail	Kannada and Hindi Versions	
2024	Captain Miller	Kannada and Tamil Versions	
2024	Hanu-Man	Kannada, Telugu, Hindi and Tamil Versions	
2024	Ondu Sarala Prema Kathe	Kannada	
2024	Shakhahaari	Kannada	
2024	Abbabba	Kannada	
2024	Kreem	Kannada	
2024	Photo	Kannada	
2024	Jackie	Kannada (Re-Release)	
2024	O2	Kannada	
2024	Guruvayoor Ambalanadayil	Malayalam Version	
2024	Moorane Krishnappa	Kannada	
2024	Sahara	Kannada	
2024	Kotee	Kannada	
2024	Chef Chidambara	Kannada	
2024	Shivamma Yarehanchinala	Kannada	
2024	Ullozhukku	Malayalam	
2024	Family Drama	Kannada	
2024	Laughing Buddha	Kannada	
2024	Ibbani Tabbida Ileyali	Kannada	
2025	3BHK	Tamil and Telugu	
2025	Hebbuli Cut	Kannada	
2025	Ekka	Kannada	
2025	Kothalavadi	Kannada	
2025	Austin Na Mahan Mouna	Kannada	
2025	Rippan Swamy	Kannada	
2025	Green Girl	Kannada	
2025	Shakthi Thirumagan	Tamil and Telugu	
2025	Aaryan	Tamil and Telugu	
2025	Udaala	Kannada	
2025	Bank Of Bhagyalakshmi	Kannada	
2025	Mark	Kannada	
2025	JC The University	Kannada	
2025	Mithya	Kannada	
2026	Mango Pachcha	Kannada	

== List of films produced ==
Key
†	Denotes films that have not yet been released

List of films produced by KRG Studios
Year	Title	Notes	Ref.
2021	Rathnan Prapancha	Direct OTT Release on Amazon Prime	
2023	Orchestra Mysuru	Presented by KRG Studios along with Daali Pictures	
2023	Gurudev Hoysala		
2024	Powder	In collaboration with The Viral Fever	
2025	Ekka	In collaboration with PRK Productions & Jayanna Films	
2025	Shodha		
2026	Mango Pachcha		
TBA	Uttarakaanda †	Rohit Padaki Direction	
