= Kapata Nataka Sutradhari =

Indian Kannada-language political satire film

- Theatrical release poster
- Directed by: Dhiraj MV
- Written by: Dhiraj MV
- Produced by: V C Shanthamma Javaregowda
- Starring: Abhirama Arjuna, Dhiraj MV, Murali Shankar Shastry, Varun Gururaj
- Cinematography: Veeresh NTA
- Edited by: Vasanth Kumar K
- Music by: Prasanna Kumar M S
- Production company: VSK Cinemas
- Release date: 4 July 2025 (India)
- Running time: 92 minutes
- Country: India
- Language: Kannada

Kapata Nataka Sutradhari is a 2025 Indian Kannada-language political satire film written and directed by Dhiraj MV. Produced by VSK Cinemas, the film stars Abhirama Arjuna, Dhiraj MV, Murali Shankar Shastry and Varun Gururaj. It was released theatrically on 4 July 2025.

== Plot ==
The story follows a young man whose visit to a sacred site of another community sets off a series of events that reveal how political interests manipulate religious sentiments and social divisions.

== Cast ==
- Abhirama Arjuna as Abhirama
- Dhiraj MV as English Meshtru
- Murali Shankar Shastry as Manoj
- Greeshma Sridhar as Pavithra
- Sri Sagar as Sidappa
- Varun Gururaj as Jolly Ravi
- Uday Achar, Sughosh Ram, Nisarg Varun, Yogesh Shankar Narayan (supporting roles)

== Production ==
The film was produced under the VSK Cinemas banner. Cinematography was handled by Veeresh NTA, editing by Vasanth Kumar K, and music composition by Prasanna Kumar M S.

== Music ==
The film’s background score and songs were composed by Prasanna Kumar M S.

== Release ==
Kapata Nataka Sutradhari was released in Indian theatres on 4 July 2025, and became available for streaming on Sun NXT from 22 August 2025.

== Reception ==
The film received mixed reviews from critics.Vivek M.V from The Hindu wrote "described Kapata Nataka Sutradhari as a sharp political satire that examines religious conflict and identity through dark humour". Jagdish Angadi from Deccan Herald wrote "termed the film a scathing critique of religion in politics and highlighted its social commentary". The Times of India noted the film’s attempt to use satire to address socio-political themes. The New Indian Express described it as a "new-age political satire" and highlighted its commentary on religious sentiments and politics.
