= Peotu =

2025 Indian Kannada language film

- Poster
- Directed by: Karthik Rajan
- Starring: Likhit MN; Ashwini Chavare
- Release date: 12 December 2025
- Country: India
- Language: Kannada

Peotu is a 2025 Indian Kannada language drama film written and directed by Karthik Rajan. The film stars Likhit MN, Ashwini Chavare in the lead role.

== Cast ==
- Ashwini Chavare
- M.N Likith
- Manjula Reddy

== Reception ==
Y Maheswara Reddy of Bangalore Mirror said that "Peotu is a story about a man drunk on alcohol and despair, and it never truly rises above its sloppy, aimless trajectory." A Sharadhaa of Cinema Express said that "It aims to explore the real consequences of heartbreak and addiction, but ends up circling around alcohol rather than telling a cohesive story." Susmita Sameera of The Times of India said that "Peotu is a term used to describe someone who has lost control over alcohol, an addict unable to break free. The film stays true to this idea, exploring the emotional and social impact of addiction, the stages a person goes through, and the haunting question: Is there truly a way out?"
