= Bili Chukki Halli Hakki =

2025 Indian Kannada language film

- Poster
- Directed by: Mahesh Gowda
- Starring: Jahangeer MS; Kaajal Kinder
- Release date: 24 October 2025
- Country: India
- Language: Kannada

Billi Chukki Halli Hakki is a 2025 Indian Kannada language film, directed by Mahesh Gowda. The film stars Jahangeer MS, Kaajal Kunder, Veena Sundeer in the lead role.

== Cast ==
- Jahangeer MS
- Kaajal Kunder
- Veena Sundeer
- Mahesh Gowda

== Reception ==
A. Sharadhaa of The New Indian Express said that "Mahesh Gowda through his story in Bilichukki Hallihakki, doesn't seek to move you through sentiment. He wants you to sit with the discomfort and re-examine the way you look at others. And in doing so, he makes the white spots of life glow with meaning." Susmita Sameera of The Times of India said that "Ultimately, Bili Chukki Halli Hakki is a deeply moving film that handles a sensitive issue with care and sincerity. It might have a few slow stretches, but the emotional core is solid. Audiences looking for a meaningful story about resilience and acceptance will find it highly rewarding." Y. Maheswara Reddy of the Bangalore Mirror said that "There is nothing to crow about the background score. It is worth a watch for those who want to understand the effects of discrimination."
