= Bhuvanam Gaganam =

2025 Indian romantic drama film

- Theatrical release poster
- Directed by: Gireesh Mulimani
- Written by: Gireesh Mulimani
- Dialogues by: Gireesh Mulimani; Prasanna M.
- Produced by: M. Munegowda
- Starring: Pramod Panju; Pruthvi Ambaar; Rachel David; Ponnu Ashwathi
- Cinematography: Uday Leela
- Edited by: Suneil Kashyap H. N.
- Music by: Gummineni Vijay
- Production company: SVC Films
- Release date: 14 February 2025
- Country: India
- Language: Kannada

Bhuvanam Gaganam (transl. Earth and sky) is a 2025 Indian Kannada-language romantic drama film directed by Gireesh Mulimani. Produced under the banner of SVC Films, the film stars Pramod Panju, Pruthvi Ambaar, Rachel David, Ponnu Ashwathi, Sharath Lohithaswa, and Achyuth Kumar.

The film narrates two parallel stories: one exploring the complexities of a modern urban marriage, and the other delving into the emotional struggles of a man with cognitive challenges in rural Karnataka. The film's title, which translates to “Earth and Sky,” symbolizes the contrasting worlds and emotional journeys of its protagonists. Featuring cinematography by Uday Leela and music composed by Gummineni Vijay, the film was released theatrically in Karnataka on 14 February 2025 to positive reviews for its layered storytelling and performances. Bhuvanam Gaganam Digital Release From July 31st in Zee5.

== Plot ==
The narrative unfolds through two parallel storylines that converge during a transformative journey to Kanyakumari.

The first storyline follows Abhi (Pramod), a college student who falls in love with his junior, Nandini (Rachel David). Their romance blossoms quickly, leading to a secret marriage despite Nandini's father Mohan (Sharath Lohitashwa) opposing the relationship due to class differences. Initially supported by friends, the couple faces mounting challenges after marriage. Abhi's work commitments and Nandini's growing sense of neglect strain their bond, while Mohan's interference deepens the rift. This track portrays the emotional cost of love constrained by societal and familial pressures.

The second storyline centers on Raam (Pruthvi Ambaar), a man with cognitive and emotional struggles living in rural Kalasa. Yearning for acceptance and maternal affection, Raam grapples with isolation and stigma. His relationship with Bhoomi (Ponnu Ashwathi), a childhood companion, offers solace but remains fragile. Raam's journey reflects an internal quest for belonging and unconditional love.

The two narratives intersect when Abhi and Raam meet during a road trip to Kanyakumari. Initially marked by friction—Abhi's impatience clashing with Raam's childlike curiosity—their dynamic evolves into mutual understanding. Through shared experiences and candid conversations, both men confront their vulnerabilities and rediscover hope. The film employs a non-linear structure, weaving flashbacks of Abhi's college romance into present-day interactions, culminating in an emotionally charged climax.

== Cast ==
- Pramod Panju as Abhi
- Pruthvi Ambaar as Raam
- Rachel David as Nandini
- Ponnu Ashwathi as Bhoomi
- Sharath Lohithaswa as Mohan
- Achyuth Kumar
- Prakash Thuminad
- K. S. Sridhar
- Harini Shreekanth
- Sparsha Rekha
- Prajwal Shetty
- Chethan Durga

== Production ==
This is the second directorial venture of Gireesh Mulimani, who made his debut with the 2017 film Raajaru. Gireesh shared his idea with M. Munegowda, which led Munegowda to venture into producing this film under the banner SVC Films. On 12 January 2022, it was reported that Pramod and Pruthvi Ambaar would collaborate with director Gireesh on an untitled project. Initially, the crew planned to begin filming in March with a sixty-day single schedule, but it was postponed due to the COVID-19 pandemic. In June 2022, it was reported that Rachel David and Rachana Rai would play the female leads, and filming was expected to commence in July. However, Rachana Rai did not join the project due to her commitments to other films and scheduling conflicts.

== Soundtrack ==
The film has songs composed by Gummineni Vijay.

Track listing
No.	Title	Lyrics	Singer(s)	Length
1.	"Bhuvana Gagana"	Aniruddha Sastry	Armaan Malik, Aishwarya Rangarajan	5:00
2.	"Hrudhayave Chooru Nillu"	Aniruddha Sastry	Sanjith Hegde, Prithwi Bhat	4:09
3.	"I Got This Feeling"	Aniruddha Sastry	Gummineni Vijay	2:38
4.	"Ee Bhuvana Aa Gagana"	Aniruddha Sastry, Ghouse Pheer	Javed Ali	4:31
5.	"Tulunaada Jackson"	Aniruddha Sastry	Aniruddha Sastry	2:56
Total length:				19:14

== Release ==
Bhuvanam Gaganam was released theatrically on 14 February 2025, coinciding with Valentine's Day.

== Reception ==
A. Sharadhaa of The New Indian Express rated the film three out of five stars and wrote, "Despite its ambitious concept, Bhuvanam Gaganam struggles to fully deliver on its potential. Director Gireesh Mulimani attempts to merge the contrasting narratives of Abhi and Nandini's love story and Ram's emotional journey, but the resolution feels anticlimactic. The film doesn't provide the emotional punch that its themes suggest, leaving viewers with a sense of coldness at its conclusion." Shashiprasad SM of Times Now gave the film two-and-a-half out of five stars and wrote, "While the film explores love and relationships, wrapped in a few special moments, Bhuvanam Gaganam falls short of delivering a truly special experience—except for the ending."

Sridevi S. of The Times of India gave it two-and-a-half out of five stars and wrote, "Director Girish Mulimani succeeds in blending two stories with a common theme of love. The film has some special, heartwarming moments towards the end, but as a whole, delivers only a very ordinary experience."
