= Dayavittu Gamanisi =

- Directed by: Rohit Padaki
- Written by: Rohit Padaki
- Produced by: Krishna Sarthak
- Starring: Rajesh Nataranga; Raghu Mukherjee; Sukrutha Wagle; Bhavana Rao; Vasishta N. Simha; Samyukta Hornad; Sangeetha Bhat
- Cinematography: Arvind S Kashyap
- Music by: Anoop Seelin
- Production company: Krishna Creations
- Distributed by: Jayanna Films
- Release date: 20 October 2017
- Country: India
- Language: Kannada

Dayavittu Gamanisi (transl. Your attention please!) is a 2017 Indian Kannada-language satirical film written, directed by Rohit Padaki, making his debut in direction. Krishna Sarthak is the main producer. It stars an ensemble cast including Raghu Mukherjee, Samyukta Hornad, Sukrutha Wagle, Vasishta N. Simha, Avinash Shatamarshan, Prakash Belawadi, Rajesh Nataranga, Bhavana Rao, Sangeetha Bhat. The film score and soundtrack for the film are composed by Anoop Seelin, and the cinematography was handled by Arvind Kashyap. It was nominated for the Filmfare Award for Best Film – Kannada at the 65th Filmfare Awards South.

== Plot ==
Four stories making a drama.

== Cast ==
- Raghu Mukherjee
- Vasishta N. Simha
- Shatasharman S Avinash
- Sukrutha Wagle as Nandini
- Samyukta Hornad
- Bhavana Rao
- Rajesh Nataranga
- Poornachandra Mysore
- Sangeetha Bhat
- Prakash Belawadi
- Shilpa Ravi
- Chandan Achar
- Ashwin Hassan

== Soundtrack ==
Dayavittu Gamanisi

Soundtrack album by Anoop Seelin
- Genre: Feature film soundtrack
- Language: Kannada
- Label: JP Music
- Producer: Anoop Seelin

The film's score and soundtrack was composed by Anoop Seelin. The music rights were acquired by JP Music.

Tracklist
No.	Title	Lyrics	Singer(s)	Length
1.	"Sanchari"	Rohit Padaki	Vijay Prakash	04:34
2.	"Marete Hodenu"	Jayanth Kaikini	Pradeep Kumar, Shwetha Devanahalli	04:05
3.	"Kandu Kandu"	Purandara Dasaru	Pandit Parameshwar Hegde	03:08
4.	"Asadullah Daati Bidda"	Arasu Anthare	Apoorva Sridhar	04:19
5.	"Burudi Buddhi"	Rohit Padaki	Rajguru Hoskote	05:24
6.	"Maayangane"	Rohit Padaki	Vyasaraj Sosale, Indu Nagaraj	01:32
7.	"Marete Hodenu (unplugged)"	Jayanth Kaikini	Vasishta N. Simha	02:45
8.	"Dayavittu Gamanisi"			03:00
9.	"Rohit Padaki"		Ananya Bhat
Total length:				25:47

== Awards and nominations ==
Award	Category	Recipient	Result	Ref
65th Filmfare Awards South	Best Film	Krishna Sarthak	Nominated	
65th Filmfare Awards South	Best Director	Rohit Padaki	Nominated	
65th Filmfare Awards South	Best Supporting Actor	Vasishta N. Simha	Nominated	
65th Filmfare Awards South	Best Supporting Actress	Samyukta Hornad	Nominated	
65th Filmfare Awards South	Best Music Director	Anoop Seelin	Nominated	
65th Filmfare Awards South	Best Playback Singer – Male	Vasishta N. Simha	Nominated	
7th South Indian International Movie Awards	Best Supporting Actor	Vasishta N. Simha	Nominated	
7th South Indian International Movie Awards	Best Supporting Actress	Samyukta Hornad	Nominated	
