= 12th Fail (soundtrack) =

2023 soundtrack album by Shantanu Moitra

Soundtrack album by Shantanu Moitra
- Released: 6 November 2023
- Genre: Feature film soundtrack
- Length: 19:35
- Language: Hindi
- Label: Saregama

Shantanu Moitra chronology
| Mujib: The Making of a Nation (2023) | 12th Fail (2023) | Kadak Singh (2023) |

12th Fail is the soundtrack album to the 2023 film of the same name directed and produced by Vidhu Vinod Chopra. Featuring musical score and soundtrack composed by Shantanu Moitra and lyrics written by Swanand Kirkire and Raftaar, the album was released under the Saregama label on 6 November 2023.

== Development ==
Chopra enlisted composer Shantanu Moitra to score the music and background due to his previous working relationship with the latter, having worked on Eklavya: The Royal Guard (2007) and most of his productions. Moitra used sitar, flute and sarod to compose the background score, inspired by Pandit Ravi Shankar's music for Pather Panchali (1955). Chopra wanted the minimal use of instrumentation to reflect its simpilcity and went great lengths in achieving it. Unmesh Banerjee made his debut in Bollywood, where he performed the tabla portions for the song "Bolo Na".

Raftaar performed the rap versions of the song "Restart" who was involved after watching the film in three parts, which was simultaneously edited to the journey with the lyrics changing at times. He eventually did the song as he liked the film and added "I had something to prove back then. The movie is already very deep and so much attention would be there."

== Release ==
On 13 October 2023, the makers unveiled the first song "Bolo Na", a romantic melody number picturized on Vikrant Massey and Medha Shankr and sung by Shaan and Shreya Ghoshal. The second song "Restart" performed by Swanand Kirkire, Shaan, with Chopra and Moitra, was released on 17 October. Raftaar's version of the song was released on 25 October.

The soundtrack was released under the Saregama label on 6 November. Besides the aforementioned three singles, the album also featured a "rap and folk" version of "Restart" and the film version of "Bolo Na" performed by Shankr. An extended version of the album featuring lofi versions of the first four tracks were released on 12 July 2024. The album was further released in Kannada, Telugu and Tamil languages.

== Reception ==
Anuj Kumar of The Hindu wrote "The minimalistic but poignant background score goes with the unostentatious performances that dot the feel-good narrative" but also added that "Shantanu Moitra's tunes don't cover up the gaps in storytelling". Uday Bhatia of Mint called "Shantanu Moitra's score is the only old-fashioned element". Bhavna Agarwal of India Today wrote "The background score adds an emotional value to the visuals in a way which is organic. There are times when you hear 'restart' in BG and it only makes you want to hum along."

Director Anurag Kashyap in his review, praised the use of sparse background music, adding "The faith the filmmaker has in himself and his actors and his storytelling that he doesn't use the BGM to manipulate the audience or the emotions."

== Track listing ==
=== Hindi ===
| No. | Title | Lyrics | Singer(s) | Length |
|---|---|---|---|---|
| 1. | "Bolo Na" | Swanand Kirkire | Shaan, Shreya Ghoshal | 4:53 |
| 2. | "Restart" | Swanand Kirkire | Swanand Kirkire, Shaan, Vidhu Vinod Chopra, Shantanu Moitra | 4:03 |
| 3. | "Restart" (Rap) | Swanand Kirkire, Raftaar | Raftaar | 2:59 |
| 4. | "Restart" (Rap 'N' Folk) | Swanand Kirkire, Raftaar | Swanand Kirkire, Shaan, Vidhu Vinod Chopra, Shantanu Moitra, Raftaar | 3:47 |
| 5. | "Bolo Na" (Film Version) | Swanand Kirkire | Medha Shankr | 3:52 |
| Total length: | | | | 19:35 |

Extended soundtrack
| No. | Title | Lyrics | Singer(s) | Length |
|---|---|---|---|---|
| 6. | "Bolo Na" (Lofi) | Swanand Kirkire | Shaan, Shreya Ghoshal, Raahi | 3:00 |
| 7. | "Restart" (Rap 'N' Folk) (Lofi) | Swanand Kirkire, Raftaar | Swanand Kirkire, Shaan, Vidhu Vinod Chopra, Shantanu Moitra, Raftaar, Raahi | 3:36 |
| 8. | "Restart" (Rap) (Lofi) | Swanand Kirkire, Raftaar | Raftaar, Raahi | 3:17 |
| 9. | "Restart" (Lofi) | Swanand Kirkire | Swanand Kirkire, Shaan, Vidhu Vinod Chopra, Shantanu Moitra, Raahi | 3:23 |
| Total length: | | | | 32:52 |

=== Kannada ===
| No. | Title | Lyrics | Singer(s) | Length |
|---|---|---|---|---|
| 1. | "Helu Ba" | Pramod Maravanthe | Chethan Naik, Sunidhi Ganesh | 5:08 |
| 2. | "Restart" | Rohit Padaki | Shashank Sheshagiri | 4:12 |
| 3. | "Helu Ba" (Lofi) | Pramod Maravanthe | Chethan Naik, Sunidhi Ganesh, Raahi | 3:04 |
| 4. | "Restart" (Lofi) | Rohit Padaki | Shashank Sheshagiri, Raahi | 3:17 |
| Total length: | | | | 15:41 |

=== Telugu ===
All lyrics are written by Suresh Kumar Banisetti.

| No. | Title | Singer(s) | Length |
|---|---|---|---|
| 1. | "Cheppava" | Deepthi Suresh, S. P. Abhishek | 5:05 |
| 2. | "Restart" | Shenbagaraj | 4:08 |
| 3. | "Cheppava" (Lofi) | Deepthi Suresh, S. P. Abhishek, Raahi | 3:04 |
| 4. | "Restart" (Lofi) | Shenbagaraj, Raahi | 3:23 |
| Total length: | | | 15:41 |

=== Tamil ===
All lyrics are written by Madhruakavi.

| No. | Title | Singer(s) | Length |
|---|---|---|---|
| 1. | "Pesuvaai" | Deepthi Suresh, S. P. Abhishek | 5:03 |
| 2. | "Restart" | Shenbagaraj | 4:08 |
| 3. | "Pesuvaai" (Lofi) | Deepthi Suresh, S. P. Abhishek, Raahi | 3:07 |
| 4. | "Restart" (Lofi) | Shenbagaraj, Raahi | 3:17 |
| Total length: | | | 15:35 |

== Background score ==
12th Fail

Film score by Shantanu Moitra
- Released: 18 December 2023
- Genre: Feature film score
- Length: 24:39
- Language: Hindi
- Label: Saregama
External audio
- Audio Jukebox on YouTube

On 18 December, the original score album consisted of 23 tracks composed by Moitra was released.

| No. | Title | Length |
|---|---|---|
| 1. | "Yeh Hai Chambal!" | 0:04 |
| 2. | "The Last Supper" | 0:29 |
| 3. | "The Unexpected Visitor" | 0:36 |
| 4. | "Lok Seva Kar Rahe Hain Aap" | 1:02 |
| 5. | "A Thousand Staring Eyes" | 0:31 |
| 6. | "Bhookhe Pet Ladoge Kaa" | 1:15 |
| 7. | "The Sound of the Corrupt" | 0:44 |
| 8. | "Dada Ki Dunali" | 0:23 |
| 9. | "The Power of the Honest" | 0:54 |
| 10. | "Badi Mushkil Se Bachayo Yeh Paisa" | 1:31 |
| 11. | "Desolation" | 0:36 |
| 12. | "Guilty Reminiscence" | 0:33 |
| 13. | "Adiyal Ki Ho Gayi Aisi Ki Taisi" | 0:23 |
| 14. | "Kuchh Bhi Kar Lunga Bhaiya" | 0:54 |
| 15. | "Haar Nahin Maante Saale" | 0:57 |
| 16. | "Papa Ko Chor Bola Na" | 1:09 |
| 17. | "Sab Theek Hi Toh Hai Bhaiya!" | 1:23 |
| 18. | "Homecoming" | 0:44 |
| 19. | "Din Bhar Kaam Raat Bhar Padhai" | 1:36 |
| 20. | "Haar Bhi Toh Nahin Maanenge Na" | 1:22 |
| 21. | "Samjhautoh Ka Andhera" | 0:36 |
| 22. | "The Lamp That Lights the Street" | 0:33 |
| 23. | "The Hymn Of Hope" | 6:15 |
| Total length: | | 24:39 |

== Accolades ==
| Award | Date of the ceremony | Category | Recipients | Result | Ref. |
|---|---|---|---|---|---|
| Filmfare Awards | 28 January 2024 | Best Background Score | Shantanu Moitra | Nominated | |
| International Indian Film Academy Awards | 28 September 2024 | Best Music Director | Shantanu Moitra | Nominated | |
