= Green Girl =

Indian Kannada-language short romantic drama film

- Theatrical release poster
- Directed by: Sarthak Hegde
- Written by: Sarthak Hegde; Triko; Manish Kumar
- Produced by: Sarthak Hegde
- Starring: Mayur Gowda; Sucharitha Haritas; Sudarshan Acharya Yekkar
- Cinematography: Abhinay Pandit
- Edited by: Bhuvanesh Manivannan
- Music by: Surya Srini
- Production company: Sarthak Hegde Film
- Distributed by: KRG Studios
- Release date: 12 September 2025
- Country: India
- Language: Kannada

Green Girl is a 2025 Indian Kannada-language short romantic drama film directed by Sarthak Hegde and starring Mayur Gowda, Sucharitha Haritas, and Sudarshan Acharya Yekkar.

== Plot ==
Set in Mangaluru, the film follows the interfaith romance between Jeevan and Ameena.

== Cast ==
- Mayur Gowda as Jeevan Acharya
- Sucharitha Haritas as Ameena, the titular character who wears a green hijab
- Sudarshan Acharya Yekkar as Prem Anna

== Reception ==
Kavya Christopher of The Times of India rated the film 2/5 stars and wrote, "Green Girl has moments of tenderness and authenticity, but it ultimately fails to rise above its clichés or deliver the emotional resonance its subject demands". Sruthi Ganapathy Raman of The Hollywood Reporter India wrote, " While the film could’ve done with a lot more nuance with the addition of just a few more minutes, Green Girl is still a film that shakes you up". Shivani Kava of The News Minute wrote, "Sometimes, it feels like a radical film made by accident, and some other times, like a liberal love story with a sharp bite".
