= Puppy (2025 film) =

Indian Kannada-language drama film

- Theatrical release poster
- Directed by: Ayush Malli
- Produced by: Anadappa Sankanur
- Starring: Jagadeesh Koppal; Aditya Sindhanur; Adrust Sankanur; Rutvik Bellary; Durugappa Kambli; Renuka; Aarav Lohith Nagraj
- Cinematography: B. Suresh Babu
- Edited by: Vishva N. M.
- Music by: Songs: Ravi Billur; Sridhar Kashyap; Score: Sridhar Kashyap
- Production company: B. B. Sankanur Films
- Release date: 1 May 2025
- Running time: 110 minutes
- Country: India
- Language: Kannada

Puppy is a 2025 Indian Kannada-language drama film directed by Ayush Malli. The film stars Jagadeesh Koppal, Aditya Sindhanur, Adrust Sankanur, Rutvik Bellary, Durugappa Kambli, Renuka, and Aarav Lohith Nagraj.

== Cast ==
- Jagadeesh Koppal as Parshya
- Aditya Sindhanur as Aadi
- Adrust Sankanur
- Rutvik Bellary
- Durugappa Kambli as Durgappa, Parshya's father
- Renuka as Renukamma, Parshya's mother
- Aarav Lohith Nagraj

== Production ==
The film was shot in Bangalore.

== Music ==
The film has a song composed by Ravi Billur and Sridhar Kashyap.

Track listing
No.	Title	Lyrics	Singer(s)	Length
1.	"Kaala Kettaitanta"	Ningappa Doni, Ayush Malli	Ningappa Doni	4:19
Total length:				4:19

== Release ==
Puppy was released theatrically on 1 May 2025.

=== Critical reception ===
Y. Maheswara Reddy of Bangalore Mirror rated the film 3/5 stars and wrote, "The director has given importance to the script without allowing any actor to stray from it. [...] The director deserves appreciation for including all elements such as comedy, sentiments, love, affection and attachment in the movie." Susmita Sameera of The Times of India gave the film 2.5/5 stars and wrote, "The raw, realistic style gives the film authenticity, though the execution is uneven. Some scenes lack emotional weight, and the humour, while effective in places, occasionally feels overdone. [...] Still, Puppy resonates with its honest portrayal of childhood, hardship, and unexpected bonds."

A. Sharadhaa of The New Indian Express gave the film 2.5/5 stars and wrote, "While it doesn’t fully explore the deeper emotional layers of migration or the children’s inner worlds, it still gently reveals the silent struggles and small hopes that shape life on the margins of a growing city." A critic from Kannada Prabha rated the film 3/5. Abhilash P. S. of Prajavani wrote that some scenes could have been trimmed since the storyline is short. A critic from Vijayavani gave it a positive review.
