= Premier Padmini (film) =

- Directed by: Ramesh Indira
- Screenplay by: Ramesh Indira
- Story by: Ramesh Indira
- Produced by: Shruti Naidu
- Starring: Jaggesh; Madhoo; Sudharani; Pramod; Vivek Simha; Hitha Chandrashekar
- Cinematography: Advaitha Gurumurthy
- Edited by: Rajendra Urs
- Music by: Arjun Janya
- Production company: Shruti Naidu Chitra
- Release date: 26 April 2019
- Running time: 111 minutes
- Country: India
- Language: Kannada

Premier Padmini is a 2019 Indian Kannada-language comedy drama film directed and written by Ramesh Indira. The film marks the debut of television personality, Shruti Naidu as the producer under her home banner Shruti Naidu Chitra. The film features Jaggesh, Madhoo, Sudharani, Hitha Chandrashekar and Vivek Simha in the lead roles. The supporting cast includes H. G. Dattatreya, Bhargavi Narayan and Pramod.

The technical crew members for the film include Arjun Janya as the music composer, Advaita Gurumurthy as the cinematographer, Rajendra Urs as the editor. The title refers to the popular automobile, the Premier Padmini.

The film launched in early March 2018 and released across theaters in Karnataka on 26 April 2019. The film was premiered on 29 September 2019 in Zee Kannada.

== Cast ==
- Jaggesh as Vinayak
- Madhoo as Shruti
- Sudharani as Spandana
- Pramod as Nanjundi
- Vivek Simha as Sumukha
- Hitha Chandrashekar as Ranjani
- H. G. Dattatreya as Vinayak's neighbour
- Ramesh Indira as Rajesh
- Bhargavi Narayan
- Aishwarya Baspure as Pragathi

== Soundtrack ==
Premier Padmini

Soundtrack album by Arjun Janya
- Released: 27 February 2019
- Recorded: 2018
- Genre: Feature film soundtrack
- Label: D-Beats
- Producer: Arjun Janya

Arjun Janya has scored the soundtrack and score for the film. The album consists of four songs and according to Janya, as per the film's script he has composed Carnatic and Hindustani classical fusion songs apart from a traditional folk song and a romantic song.

Track listing
No.	Title	Lyrics	Singer(s)	Length
1.	"Premier Padmini"	Yogaraj Bhat	Vijay Prakash	03:40
2.	"Naa Huduko Naale"	V. Nagendra Prasad	Nihal Tauro	03:42
3.	"Payanava"	Sai Sarvesh	Sanjith Hegde	03:17
4.	"Yaaru Illada Mane"	Kaviraj	Vyasaraj	03:32

== Controversy ==
The movie borrowed heavily from Kannada author Vasudhendra's short story without giving any credits or soliciting his permission.
