= Rohit Padaki =

Indian filmmaker

- Education: PES University
- Occupations: Film director, writer, lyricist, actor
- Years active: 2015–present

Rohit Padaki is an Indian film director, writer, lyricist and actor who works primarily in Kannada cinema. He made his directorial début with an independent romantic comedy film, Ashtralle Just Missoo in 2015. Following this, he wrote lyrics and acted in few other films such as Aatagara (2015) and Aake (2017), before his first mainstream directorial film, Dayavittu Gamanisi in 2017. His other popular films as a director include, Rathnan Prapancha (2021), Ekka (2025) and Uttarakaanda (2026).

Besides films, Rohit has been an active writer and creative director for many Kannada TV Shows. He has also worked in reality shows such as Bigg Boss Kannada and Weekend with Ramesh. The film Dayavittu Gamanisi was nominated in the most number of categories for Filmfare Awards and was screened in the Nitte Film Festival. Rohit has been nominated individually at the international award ceremonies such as SIIMA and IIFA.

== Career ==
Rohit's earlier projects have been associated with director K. M. Chaitanya. The duo has worked together in Aatagara (2015), Aake (2017) and Aadyaa (2020). In Aatagara, Rohit wrote dialogues and lyrics apart from acting in a supporting role. The lyrics for the song "Tarammayya" earned a nomination at the 1st IIFA Utsavam. His independent film Ashtralle Just Missoo released in 2015 and could not bring him success. His breakthrough came with the mainstream cinema Dayavittu Gamanisi in 2017. Having an ensemble cast, the film was critically acclaimed and was nominated for the Filmfare Award for Best Film – Kannada at the 65th Filmfare Awards South. Rohit earned a nomination for his direction.

In 2021, Rohit teamed up with KRG Studios for his next directorial, Rathnan Prapancha, a dark comedy film. The film was streamed on Amazon Prime Video during the COVID-19 lockdown. The film, starring Dhananjay and Reba Monica John, received positive reviews from critics and audiences and was considered a "streaming blockbuster". Rohit was nominated under Best director and Best Lyricist at the 10th South Indian International Movie Awards. In 2023, he contributed to the Kannada version of 12th Fail (soundtrack) by writing lyrics for the song "Restart".

Rohit's next project titled Ekka was backed by three production houses: PRK Productions, KRG Studios and Jayanna Films. The film announced in October 2024, released in July 2025 and starred Yuva Rajkumar and Sanjana Anand in lead roles. Rohit again teamed up with KRG Studios for yet another multi-starrer action drama film Uttarakaanda. The film was announced in June 2022 and went on floors in January 2023, still remains unreleased.

== Filmography ==
Key
†	Denotes films that have not yet been released

Year	Film	Director	Writer	Lyricist	Notes	Ref.
2015	Aatagara	No	Dialogues	Yes	Nominated - IIFA Utsavam Award for Best Lyricist for "Tarammayya"; Played the role of SI Rohit	
2015	Ashtralle Just Missoo	Yes	Yes	Yes		
2017	Aake	No	Dialogues	Yes		
2017	Dayavittu Gamanisi	Yes	Yes	Yes	Nominated - Filmfare Award for Best Director	
2020	Aadyaa	No	No	Yes	Wrote lyrics for "Neene Kaarana"	
2021	Rathnan Prapancha	Yes	Yes	Yes	Nominated - Best Director Award (SIIMA); Nominated - Best Lyricist for "Alemaariye"	
2023	12th Fail	No	No	Yes	Kannada version	
2025	Ekka	Yes	Yes	Yes	Singer for "Rowdy Rhymes" and "Ekka Maar"	
TBA	Uttarakaanda †	Yes	Yes	Yes		
