= Pramod Panju =

Indian actor

- Born: 10 January 1990 (age 36); Mandya, Karnataka, India
- Other name: Pramod
- Occupation: Actor
- Years active: 2009–present

Pramod Panju (born 10 January 1990) is an Indian actor who works predominantly in the Kannada film and television. He began his career in television with popular serials such as Chukki, Punar Vivaha, and Mahadevi before making his film debut with Geetha Bangle Store (2015). Known for his versatility and natural acting style, Pramod has appeared in critically acclaimed films like Premier Padmini (2019), Matte Udbhava (2020), and Rathnan Prapancha (2021), the latter earning him widespread recognition.

Pramod’s performance in Rathnan Prapancha won him the Karnataka State Film Award for Best Supporting Actor (2021) and a Filmfare Award nomination for Best Supporting Actor – Kannada (2022). He was also nominated for the SIIMA Award in the same category. Apart from these, he has featured in commercial entertainers such as Bond Ravi (2022) and appeared in a pivotal role in the pan-Indian blockbuster Salaar: Part 1 – Ceasefire (2023).

== Early life ==
Pramod Panju was born on 10 January 1990 in Mandya, Karnataka, India. He grew up in a middle-class family and completed his schooling at St. Anne’s High School, Maddur. Later, he pursued his graduation from Surana College, Bengaluru. From an early age, Pramod was passionate about acting and performing arts, which led him to explore opportunities in television before entering films.

Pramod began his career in the Kannada entertainment industry as a television actor. He appeared in several popular serials, which helped him gain recognition among audiences. He portrayed Shiva character in the teleseries, Mahadevi. In Sanju Mattu Naanu, he played the romantic lead as Karthik.

== Career ==
Pramod Panju made his film debut with Geetha Bangle Store (2015), a rural romance that earned him critical appreciation for his natural performance. He later appeared in Premier Padmini (2019), a slice-of-life drama alongside Jaggesh, which showcased his ability to handle mature and layered characters. In 2020, he starred in Matte Udbhava, a comedy-drama directed by Kodlu Ramakrishna.

His breakthrough role came with Rathnan Prapancha (2021), where he portrayed Udaal Babu Rao, a character that brought him widespread recognition and critical acclaim. This performance earned him the Karnataka State Film Award for Best Supporting Actor and nominations for Filmfare and SIIMA Awards in the same category. Following this success, Pramod featured in the mass entertainer Bond Ravi (2022) and played a pivotal role in the pan-Indian blockbuster Salaar: Part 1 – Ceasefire (2023).

In 2025, he played the role of Abhi in the triangular love story, Bhuvanam Gaganam (2025). His upcoming projects include Alankar Vidyarthi, and Halka Don.

== Filmography ==
- All films are in Kannada unless otherwise noted.

Key
| † | Denotes films that have not yet been released |

| Year | Film | Role | Notes | Ref. |
|---|---|---|---|---|
| 2015 | Geetha Bangle Store | Veerabhadra | | |
| 2019 | Premier Padmini | Driver Nanjudi | | |
| 2020 | Matte Udbhava | Ganesh | | |
| 2021 | Rathnan Prapancha | Udaal Babu Rao | Winner - Karnataka State Film Award for Best Supporting Actor; Nominated - Filmfare Award for Best Supporting Actor – Kannada | |
| 2022 | Bond Ravi | Bond Ravi | | |
| 2023 | Salaar: Part 1 – Ceasefire | Baachi Raja Mannar | Telugu film | |
| 2025 | Bhuvanam Gaganam | Abhi | | |
| 2026 | Lenin | Vasanth | Telugu film | |
| 2026 | Halka Don † | Don | Kannada-Telugu bilingual film; Filming | |
| 2026 | English Manja † | TBA | Filming | |

=== Television ===
| Serial | Role | Channel | Ref |
|---|---|---|---|
| Lakumi | | Star Suvarna | |
| Chukki | | Star Suvarna | |
| Punar Vivaha | Ranjith | Zee Kannada | |
| Mahadevi | Shiva | Zee Kannada | |
| Sanju Mattu Naanu | Karthik | Colors Kannada | |
