= Rathnan Prapancha =

2021 Indian Kannada-language comedy drama film

- Official release poster
- Directed by: Rohit Padaki
- Written by: Rohit Padaki
- Produced by: Karthik Gowda; Yogi G Raj
- Starring: Dhananjay; Reba
- Cinematography: Shreesha Kuduvalli
- Edited by: Deepu S. Kumar
- Music by: B. Ajaneesh Loknath
- Production company: KRG Studios
- Distributed by: Amazon Prime Video
- Release date: 22 October 2021
- Running time: 149 minutes
- Country: India
- Language: Kannada

Rathnan Prapancha (transl. Rathna's World) is a 2021 Indian Kannada-language comedy drama film written and directed by Rohit Padaki and produced by Karthik and Yogi G Raj under the banner KRG Studios. The film stars Dhananjay, Malayalam actress, Reba Monica John in her Kannada debut, Shruti, Panju, Umashree, and Ravishankar Gowda, It was released directly on the digital platform Amazon Prime Video on 22 October 2021. It received positive reviews from critics and audiences and became a streaming blockbuster on Amazon Prime Video

== Plot ==
Rathnakara is an insurance agent in Bangalore who is awaiting his transfer order to Mumbai and lives a dull life with his cunning, badmouthed and irritating mother, Saroja. One day, Rathnakara learns from a journalist, Mayuri, that he was adopted as an infant by Saroja and leaves his home to find his real world. During the Journey, Rathnakara realizes that blood relations are not important, but the one who took care of us lovingly is important in our life. Rathnakara calls Saroja, only to find that she died from a heart attack, thus leaving him devastated. He leaves for his home and cancels his transfer order to live with his family in remembrance of Saroja.

== Cast ==
- Dhananjay as Rathnakara
- Reba Monica John as Mayuri
- Umashree as Saroja Bai, Rathnkara's Adoptive Mother
- Shruti as Yellavva, Udaal Baburao's Adoptive Mother
- Pramod Panju as Udaal Babu Rao, Rathnakar's Younger Brother
- Anu Prabhakar as Tabassum, Rathnakar's Elder Sister
- Ravishankar Gowda as Ahmed Ali, Tabassum's Husband
- Vainidhi Jagadish as Benni, Udaal Baburao's love interest
- Shobha Raghavendra as Triveni -Rathnakar, Tabassum, Udaal Baburao's Birth Mother
- Achyuth Kumar as Basappa, Udaal Babu Rao's Adoptive Father
- Akkai Padmashali as Paravva, Mayuri's Foster Mother
- Rajesh Nataranga as Srinath, Journalist Who Owns a Press
- Usha Bhandari as Boobamma, Saroja's Neighbour and Friend
- Ashwin Rao Pallakki as Rathnakar's Friend
- Ashok Sharma as Raghu, Saroja's Son
- Divyashree Mohan as Raghu's Wife
- Shivaji Rao Jadhav as Postman Ramesh, Saroja's Husband
- Anantha Velu as Azghar Saab Mulla
- M. K. Mata as Mushfiqur, Tabassum's Adoptive Father
- Govinde Gowda as Rathnakara's Friend and Broker
- Danappa Mudalagi as Daanya
- Yeshwanth Bijoor
- Veena Rao as Villager
- Jahangir as a villager
- Tilak Shekar as Mayuri's Boyfriend (Cameo)
- Vaijanath Biradar as a Blind Man (Cameo)
- Sundar Veena as Traffic Inspector (Cameo)
- Rakshitha Shetty as Anchor in Mother's Day Program (cameo)

== Production ==
Rathnan Prapancha is shot in various locations like Bangalore, Mysore, Kashmir, and Gadag

== Soundtrack ==
Rathnan Prapancha

Soundtrack album by B. Ajaneesh Loknath
- Released: 18 October 2021
- Genre: Feature film soundtrack
- Language: Kannada
- Label: Lahari Music

B. Ajaneesh Loknath chronology
Hero (2021)	Rathnan Prapancha (2021)	Drishya 2 (2021)

B. Ajaneesh Loknath scored background music for the film and its soundtrack.

Track listing (Kannada)
No.	Title	Lyrics	Singer(s)	Length
1.	"Gicchi Giligili"	Shivu Bhergi	Puneeth Rajkumar	4:00
2.	"Alemaariye"	Rohit Padaki	Sanjith Hegde, B. Ajaneesh Loknath	5:13
3.	"Watt a Lyffu"	Pramod Maravante	B. Ajaneesh Loknath	3:55

== Release ==
The satellite and digital rights were secured by Zee Kannada and Amazon Prime Video, where the film was released on 22 October 2021 in Amazon Prime Video.

== Awards ==
Award	Category	Recipient	Result	Ref.
10th South Indian International Movie Awards
10th South Indian International Movie Awards	Best Director	Rohit Padaki	Nominated	
10th South Indian International Movie Awards	Best Cinematographer	Shreesha Kuduvalli	Nominated	
10th South Indian International Movie Awards	Best Actor in a Supporting Role	Pramod Panju	Won	
10th South Indian International Movie Awards	Best Actress in a Supporting Role	Vainidhi Jagadish	Nominated	
10th South Indian International Movie Awards	Best Debut Producer	KRG Productions	Won	
10th South Indian International Movie Awards	Best Lyricist	Rohit Padaki ("Alemaariye")	Nominated	
67th Filmfare Awards South
67th Filmfare Awards South	Best Actress	Reba Monica John	Nominated	
67th Filmfare Awards South	Best Supporting Actor	Pramod Panju	Nominated	
67th Filmfare Awards South	Best Supporting Actress	Umashree	Won	
67th Filmfare Awards South	Best Cinematographer	Shreesha Kuduvalli	Won	
