= Aravind Kaushik =

Indian film director

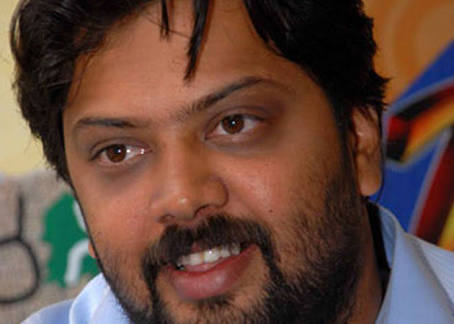
- Aravind at press meet
- Born: 14 January 1980 (age 46); Bangalore, Karnataka, India
- Occupations: Director, Lyricist, Screenwriter
- Years active: 2002–present
- Spouse: Shilpa (m. 2010)

Aravind Kaushik (born January 14, 1980) is an Indian film director and screenwriter who works in Kannada cinema. He rose to fame with 2010 film Nam Areal Ond Dina.

== Career ==
He made his direction debut with 2010 film Nam Areal Ond Dina starring Anish Tejeshwar, Meghana Gaonkar, Rakshit Shetty. He then directed Thuglak in 2012. He wrote lyrics for 2013 film Coffee with My wife. Kaushik has also directed some television serials. In 2017 he directed Huliraaya.

== Personal life ==
Aravind Kaushik (14 January 1980) was born and brought up in Bangalore, Karnataka, India. He married Shilpa an actress in 2010.

== Filmography ==
As a director and lyricist

Year	Film	Director	Screenwriter	Lyricist	Notes
2010	Nam Areal Ond Dina	Yes	Yes	Yes	Direction debut
2012	Tuglak	Yes	Yes	Yes	Also actor
2013	Coffee With My Wife			Yes	
2017	Huliraaya	Yes	Yes	Yes	
2021	Shardula	Yes			

As a dubbing artist

Year	Film	Notes
2002	Joot	
2003	Excuse Me	
2005	Nenapirali	
2006	7 O' Clock	for Mithun Tejaswi
2008	Honganasu	

=== Television ===
Year	Title	Role	Channel	Notes
2018–Present	Kamali	Director	Zee Kannada	
2020 -	Lagnapatrike	Director	Colors Kannada	
