= Kalidasa Kannada Meshtru =

- Directed by: Kaviraj
- Produced by: Uday Kumar
- Starring: Jaggesh; Meghana Gaonkar
- Cinematography: Suresh Gundlupet
- Edited by: K. M. Prakash
- Music by: Gurukiran
- Production company: Uday Films
- Release date: 22 November 2019
- Country: India
- Language: Kannada

Kalidasa Kannada Meshtru (transl. Kalidasa Kannada teacher) is a 2019 Indian Kannada-language comedy drama film directed by Kaviraj and starring Jaggesh and Meghana Gaonkar.

== Plot ==
Kalidasa, a government school teacher, is a hard worker who is ridiculed for his poor English skills. On the personal front, his upper-class wife is unhappy with his social status. When the school faces the threat of being shut down, Kalidasa takes it on himself to fight the education system.

== Cast ==
- Jaggesh as Kalidasa
- Meghana Gaonkar as Suma, Kalidasa's wife
- T. S. Nagabharana
- Tabla Nani
- Ambika
- Raghu Ramankoppa

Cameo appearances in promotional song

- Rachita Ram
- Haripriya
- Amulya
- Shubha Poonja
- Aditi Prabhudeva
- Sonu Gowda
- Divya Uruduga
- Samyukta Hornad
- Harshika Poonacha
- Nishvika Naidu
- Sindhu Lokanath
- Krishi Thapanda
- Vaibhavi Jai Jagadish
- Vainidhi Jai Jagadish
- Vaisiri Jai Jagdish
- Anupama Gowda
- Karunya Ram
- Roopika
- Disha Poovaiah

== Production ==
Kaviraj initially wanted to make a thriller with Jaggesh. Kaviraj was inspired to make this film after reading a newspaper article about a student writing his death note in an exam. Jaggesh's character is similar to the ones in his 1990s films.

== Themes and influences ==
Jaggesh's and Meghana Gaonkar's characters are representations of Kali and Dasa, respectively.

== Release ==
The film was scheduled to release on 15 November, but it released on 22 November.

== Reception ==
A. Sharadhaa of The New Indian Express opined that "Kalidasa Kannada Mestru ends with a thought -- educate children, but do not punish them. It is a well-timed film and will come in handy for parents preparing their children for exams. This is a topic that needs attention from the entire family". Sunayana Suresh of The Times of India wrote that "The film has its intent in place and does have a fair share of comedy and drama that ensure the audience is entertained." Shyam Prasad S. of Bangalore Mirror stated that "Kalidasa Kannada Meshtru is at the higher end of entertainment."

== Television ==
The film premiered on television on 4 April 2020.
