= Mahesh Rao =

Indian Director & screenwriter

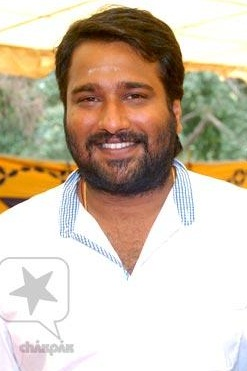
- Born: 1982 (age 43–44); Bangalore, Karnataka, India
- Occupations: Film director Screenwriter; Dialogue writer
- Years active: 2008 – present
- Spouse: Kirthika M Rao (2012–present)
- Children: Hasini M Rao Nainika M Rao

Mahesh Rao (born 14 February 1982) is an Indian director, screenplay writer and lyricist who works in Kannada films. He is known for the movies Dheemaku, Murali meets Meera (2011) Bhadra (2011) and Santhu Straight Forward (2016)

== Film career ==
After his successful stint at television serials, Mahesh Rao made his debut through Dheemaku (2008), starring Naveen Krishna in the lead role. The movie got average reviews from critics and was an average grosser at box office. In 2009 he collaborated with Milana fame director Prakash for the screenplay of Gokula. His second film, Murali Meets Meera, a romantic film based on a novel, was released in 2011, with Prajwal Devraj in the lead role. Murali Meets Meera too earned positive response from critics, with The Times of India and Bangalore Mirror rating it 4/5 and Sify rating it 3/5. The movie subsequently went on to become a sleeper hit after running for 50 days at the box office. Following the success of Murali Meets Meera, Mahesh Rao's next was Bhadra, a remake of the Telugu movie Ranam, and introduced Daisy Shah pairing with Prajwal Devraj. He made some changes to the screenplay to suit the nativity of the Kannada audience and the movie went on to become a super hit running 75 days at the box office with overall critics rating it as 3/5 and praising his direction skills. In 2013, he was roped in to direct Case No. 18/9, a remake of the Tamil hit Vazhakku enn 18/9. After its release, the film received generally positive reviews from critics. The performances of Niranjan Shetty, Sindhu Lokanath, Shwetha Pandit and Rangayana Raghu, and the film's direction, screenplay and narration received praise from critics. Case No. 18/9 was a profitable venture for the producers fetching 1.57 crores (US$230,000) only from satellite rights from Suvarna TV. Then he went on to direct Endendu Ninagagi which was a remake of Engeyum Eppothum and was a box office failure even after receiving positive reviews from critics. His next movie was Kwatle Satisha which was again a remake of Naduvula Konjam Pakkatha Kaanom. Kwatle Satisha received positive reviews from critics and was a profitable venture for the producer. His next stint was as dialogue writer for the Ganesh starrer movie Khushi Khushiyagi released in 2015. Initially there were speculations that he would direct a movie starring Yash for the remake of Tamil movie Vaalu but eventually the remake idea was scrapped. Mahesh Rao wrote his own script and it was finalised by producer K.Manju. This film got the final title Santhu Straight Forward and will go on floors February 2016 starring Yash and Radhika Pandit.

== Filmography ==
=== As film director ===
Year	Title	Notes
2008	Dheemaku	
2011	Murali Meets Meera	
2011	Bhadra	
2012	Case No. 18/9	
2014	Endendu Ninagagi	
2014	Kwatle Satisha	
2016	Prachanda	
2016	Santhu Straight Forward	

=== As writer ===
Year	Title	Writer	Notes
2009	Gokula	Screenplay	
2010	Vaare Vah	Dialogues	
2017	Tarak	story	

=== Television shows ===
Title	Role
E Prashne (quiz show)	Assistant Director
Godhuli	Assistant Director
Thulasi	Assistant Director
Yava Janmada Maithri	Episode Director
Utsava	Director
Chikkamma	Screenwriter
Lakumi	Screenwriter
Sose Tanda Sowbhagya	Screenwriter
Putta Gowri Maduve	Screenwriter
Akka	Screenwriter
Mangala Gowri Maduve	Screenwriter
Geetha	Screenwriter
Naagini 2	Screenwriter
Kamali	Screenwriter
Amruthadhare	Screenwriter
Lakshmi Nivasa	Screenwriter
Annayya	Screenwriter
Gettimelam (Tamil)	Screenwriter, director
