= List of songs recorded by Puneeth Rajkumar =

Puneeth Rajkumar was an Indian actor and singer who worked in Kannada films.

Year	Film	Song	Composer(s)	Writer(s)	Co-artist(s)	Notes	Ref.
1981	Bhagyavantha	"Baana Dariyalli Soorya"	T. G. Lingappa	Chi. Udayashankar			
1981	Bhagyavantha	"Amma Seethamma"	T. G. Lingappa	Chi. Udayashankar	Poornachandra		
1982	Chalisuva Modagalu	"Kaanadante Maayavadano"	Rajan–Nagendra	Chi. Udayashankar			
1983	Bhakta Prahlada	"Govinda Govinda"	T. G. Lingappa				
1983	Bhakta Prahlada	"Ela Elavo"	T. G. Lingappa		Rajkumar		
1983	Eradu Nakshatragalu	"Nanna Udupu Ninnadu"	G. K. Venkatesh	Chi. Udayashankar			
1983	Eradu Nakshatragalu	"Howdu Endare Howdu"	G. K. Venkatesh	Chi. Udayashankar	Rajkumar, Vani Jairam		
1983	Eradu Nakshatragalu	"Amma Kanu Bidamma"	G. K. Venkatesh	Chi. Udayashankar	Sulochana		
1984	Yarivanu	"Kannige Kaanuva"	Rajan–Nagendra	Chi. Udayashankar			
1984	Yarivanu	"Aakashade Haaraduva"	Rajan–Nagendra	Chi. Udayashankar	Rajkumar		
1985	Bettada Hoovu	"Thaye Sharadhe"	Rajan–Nagendra		P. B. Srinivas		
1985	Bettada Hoovu	"Bisile Irali Maleye Barali"	Rajan–Nagendra	Chi. Udayashankar	S. P. Balasubrahmanyam		
1989	Parashuram	"Kadre Thappu"	Hamsalekha	T P Kailasam			
2002	Appu	"Taliban Alla Alla"	Gurukiran	Upendra			
2003	Abhi	"Mama Mama Maja Madu"	Gurukiran	Hamsalekha			
2004	Veera Kannadiga	"Nai Re Nai Re Baba"	Chakri	Bhangi Ranga			
2004	Maurya	"Simpalagi Heltheeni"	Gurukiran	S. Narayan			
2004	Maurya	"Machhalli Kocchodilla"	Gurukiran	Upendra			
2005	Rishi	"Bandarura Bandarelle"	Gurukiran	V. Manohar	Chaitra H. G.		
2005	Aakash	"Hodi Hodi"	R. P. Patnaik	K. Kalyan			
2005	Namma Basava	"Rukku Rukku Rukkamma"	Gurukiran	Bhangi Ranga			
2007	Arasu	"Baaro Baaro"	Joshua Sridhar	V. Nagendra Prasad	Suchitra		
2007	Lava Kusha	"Hotappa Hot Sakkath"	Gurukiran	Kaviraj	Chaitra H. G.		
2008	Bindaas	"Bengalooru Mangalooru"	Gurukiran	V. Nagendra Prasad			
2008	Vamshi	"Jothe Jotheyali"	R. P. Patnaik	Ram Narayan	Shreya Ghoshal		
2009	Raam	"Hosa Gaana Bajaana"	V. Harikrishna	V. Nagendra Prasad	Suri Suresh		
2010	Jackie	"Edavatt Aythu"	V. Harikrishna	Jayanth Kaikini, Yogaraj Bhat	Priya Himesh		
2010	Mylari	"Mylapura Mylari"	Gurukiran	Kaviraj			
2011	Shyloo	"Pada Pada Kannada"	Jassie Gift	S.Narayan			
2012	Sidlingu	"Barbhad Building"	Anoop Seelin	Vijaya prasad			
2012	Anna Bond	"Kaanadante Maayavadanu (Remix)"	V. Harikrishna	Chi. Udayashankar			
2013	Tony	"Pakka Paapi Naanu"	Sadhu Kokila	Yogaraj Bhat			
2013	Ale	"Solu Nanagagodilla"	Mano Murthy	Yogaraj Bhat			
2013	Savaari 2	"Motu Beedi (Pipi Song)"	Manikanth Kadri	Manju M. Doddmani Anupama			
2014	Adyaksha	"Adyaksha Adyaksha"	Arjun Janya	V. Nagendra Prasad	L. N. Shastry	Won - Zee Kannada Music Award For Best Male Playback Singer	
2014	Aryan	"Kannada Mannina"	Jassie Gift	Kaviraj	Sunidhi Chauhan		
2014	Power	"Guruvara Sanje"	S. Thaman	Kaviraj		Nominated - Filmfare Award for Best Male Playback Singer	
2014	Dove	"Ello Nan Dove"	Arjun Janya	Santhu			
2014	Tirupathi Express	"Naanu Righta"	Arjun Janya	V. Nagendra Prasad			
2015	Krishna-Leela	"Pesal Man"	V. Sridhar	V. Sridhar			
2015	Rudra Tandava	"Ondooralli"	V. Harikrishna				
2015	Rana Vikrama	"Neene Neene"	V. Harikrishna	Kaviraj	Palak Muchhal		
2015	Rocket	"Thannage Idvi"	Poornachandra Tejasvi	Hariparak	Aishani Shetty		
2015	Uppi 2	"Uppittu Uppittu"	Gurukiran	Upendra			
2015	Jaathre	"Tarikere Yerimele"	Manikanth Kadri	V. Nagendra Prasad	Supriya Lohith		
2015	Krishna-Rukku	"Lipstick Olagina"	V. Sridhar	Anand Priya	Shweta Prabhu		
2015	Ram Leela	"Teri Beautiful Ankhein"	Anoop Rubens	D. C. Sudarshan			
2016	Killing Veerappan	"Spot Spot"	Munna Kasi	Chethan Kumar			
2016	Preethi Kitaabu	"Keli Marayre"	V. Manohar	V. Manohar			
2016	Akira	"Kanna Sanneyindalene"	B. Ajaneesh Loknath	Dhananjay Ranjan			
2016	Jai Maruthi 800	"Jai Maruthi"	Arjun Janya	Chethan Kumar	Indu Nagaraj		
2016	Chakravyuha	"Yenaithu"	S. Thaman	Kaviraj	Kajal Aggarwal		
2016	Bilinder	"Chilre Shooki"	Ravi Basrur				
2016	Thale Bachkolli Powder Hakkolli	"143 Naa Helali Hege"	Vijaya Bharathi	Shivu Jamakhandi	Vijayalakshmi		
2016	Zoom	"Raja Di Raja"	S. Thaman	Prashant Raj			
2016	Run Antony	"Jhanak Jhanak"	Manikanth Kadri	V. Nagendra Prasad		Nominated - Filmfare Award for Best Male Playback Singer - Kannada; Nominated - IIFA Award for Best Male Playback Singer - Kannada	
2016	Nanna Ninna Prema Kathe	"Orchestra"	Shivu Jamakhandi	Shivu Jamakhandi		Nominated - IIFA Award for Best Male Playback Singer - Kannada	
2016	Kalpana 2	"Nan Sigdhakadru Kannada"	Arjun Janya	Kaviraj			
2016	Doddmane Hudga	"Abhimanigale Nammane Devru"	V. Harikrishna	Yogaraj Bhat	Shiva Rajkumar		
2016	Crazy Boy	"Thirugi Node Gantogalla"	Jassie Gift	Anand			
2016	Nataraja Service	"Nataraja Service"	Anoop Seelin	Pawan Wadeyar			
2016	Golisoda	"Lo Eddelo"	Sai Karthik	Ram Jogaiah Shastry			
2016	Jalsa	"Roadal Hogo Hudugeernella"	Veer Samarth	Shashank			
2016	Mumbai	"Dasavald Hoova"	V. Sridhar	V. Sridhar			
2017	Chowka	"Party Party Nightu"	Anoop Seelin	Chetan Kumar			
2017	Melkote Manja	"Lifey Subjectu"	Giridhar Diwan	Yogaraj Bhat			
2017	Raajakumara	"Yaakingagidhe"	V. Harikrishna	Santosh Ananddam			
2017	Raajaru	"Swachcha Manasu"	V. Sridhar	V. Nagendra Prasad	Shweta Prabhu		
2017	Preethiya Raayabhari	"Nangu Beka Introduction"	Arjun Janya	M. M. Mutthu			
2017	Uppu Huli Khara	"Ro Ro Romeo"	Prajwal Pai	A. P. Arjun	Sangeetha Ravindranath		
2017	Sihir	"Please Adjust Maadkoli"	Chaitra H. G.	V. Nagendra Prasad			
2017	Anjani Putra	"1234 Shille Hodi"	Ravi Basrur	V. Nagendra Prasad			
2017	Brihaspathi	"Damaru Damaru Dam"	V. Harikrishna	Yogaraj Bhat			
2017	Mahanubhavaru	"Gadige Hornu Breaku"	Satish Mourya	Sandeep Nagalikar	Sriimurali		
2018	Kumari 21F	"Dhakku Dhakku"	Mahati Swara Sagar	Kaviraj			
2018	Samhaara	"Yenachariyu"	Ravi Basrur	Jayanth Kaikini			
2018	Kismath	"Churuchurumuri"	Rajesh Murugesan	Vijay Raghavendra			
2018	Johnny Johnny Yes Papa	"Johnny Johnny Yes Papa"	B. Ajaneesh Loknath				
2018	Raambo 2	"Elli Kaan Ellikaaneno"	Arjun Janya	Yogaraj Bhat			
2018	Vaasu Naan Pakka Commercial	"Rangeride"	B. Ajaneesh Loknath	Kiran Kaverappa	C.R. Bobby		
2018	Umil	"Ravond Ravond Bathund Umil"	Ravi Basrur	Keerthan Bandary		Tulu song	
2019	Aduva Gombe	"Aa Deva Roopisisda Andadaa Gombe"	Violin Hemanth Kumar				
2019	Kavaludaari	"Kavaludaari Title Track"	Charan Raj	Kiran Kaverappa			
2019	Ratnamanjarii	"Mina Mina"	Harshvardhan Raj	K. Kalyan			
2019	Kiss	"BetteGowda V/s ChikkaBoramma"	V. Harikrishna	A. P. Arjun			
2019	Mataash	"Chajji Rotti Chavakailli"	S. D. Arvind	Sunil Kumar Sudhakar			
2019	Geetha	"Kannadiga Kannadiga"	Anup Rubens	Santhosh Ananddram			
2019	"Cauvery Calling" (single)	"Haadu Cauvery"		Jaggi Vasudev			
2019	Sarvajanikarige Suvarnavakaasha	"Yenu Swamy Maadona"	Midhun Mukundan	V. Nagendra Prasad			
2019	Girmit	"Dhoom Ratta"	Ravi Basrur	Ravi Basrur			
2020	Kaanadante Maayavadanu	"Kaledhoda Kaalidaasa"	Gummineni Vijay	V. Nagendra Prasad			
2020	French Biriyani	"Yen Maadodu Swamy"	Vasuki Vaibhav	Vasuki Vaibhav, Avinash Balekkala			
2021	Ramarjuna	"Manase Chooru"	Ananda Rajavikrama	Naveen Reddy G			
2021	Yuvarathnaa	"Oorigobba Raaja"	S. Thaman	Santhosh Ananddram	Ramya Behara		
2021	Gajanana and Gang	"Naan Olleyavne"	Praddyottan	Abhishek Shetty			
2021	Rathnan Prapancha	"Gicchi Giligili"	B. Ajaneesh Loknath	Shivu Bhergi			
2022	Man of the Match	"Rangamandira"	Vasuki Vaibhav	V. Manohar			
2022	Yellow Board	"Hathro Yellow Boardu"	Adhvik	Chethan Kumar			
2022	Hareesha Vayassu 36	"Hareesha Vayassu 36"	Adhvik	Gururaj Jyeshta	Bhavya Pradeep		
2022	Namma Hudugaru	"I Love You"	Abhimann Roy	Chethan Kumar			
2022	O	"Yeno Ondhu Jaadhu"	Kiran Ravindranath	Chethan Kumar	Anuradha Bhat		
