= Ramarjuna =

2021 Kannada film

- Directed by: Anish Tejeshwar
- Written by: Anish Tejeshwar
- Produced by: Anish Tejeshwar; Rakshit Shetty
- Starring: Anish Tejeshwar; Nishvika Naidu
- Cinematography: Naveen Kumar S
- Edited by: Sharath Kumar
- Music by: Anand Rajavikram
- Production company: Winkwhistle Productions
- Distributed by: KRG films
- Release date: 29 January 2021
- Running time: 130 minutes
- Country: India
- Language: Kannada

Ramarjuna is a 2021 Indian Kannada-language action drama film written and directed by Anish Tejeshwar in his directorial debut. It stars Anish Tejeshwar and Nishvika Naidu in their second collaboration after Vaasu Naan Pakka Commercial.

== Plot ==
Ram is an insurance agent living in a village. He is beloved by his mother and the villagers and will go to any extent to help them and also had assured insurance policy to them for their welfare. Badrinarayana is a real estate dealer, who wants to evacuate the slum for his personal profits and has been troubling the villagers in this regard. However, his attempts are thwarted by Ram. Meanwhile, Ram meets Khushi, who is a law student and falls in love with her. He impresses her using a few tricks given by his artist friend Peter, a middle-aged man.

However, it is revealed that Khushi is actually Peter's daughter, who has separated from his wife Janaki, due to a misunderstanding. Hariprasad is an altruistic doctor, who organizes a free medical checkup/welfare for the villagers with Ram and their village president Rajanna's help and also tries to help the villagers whenever need arises. One night, a few henchman barge into the neighbourhood and brutally hack 20 villagers to death. Ram deduces that they are Badrinarayana's henchmen where he along with the villagers held Badrinaryanan and his henchman at knife point, but Badrinarayan denies the killings.

Realizing that someone else is behind the villagers's deaths, they decide to investigate. Ram also clears the misunderstanding between Peter and Janaki, who realizes her mistake in snot trusting Peter and eventually accepts his and Khushi's relationship. Janaki reveals to Kushi about Peter and ask Ram to take her to him to seek forgiveness. However, they learn that Peter has been hacked to death, much to everyone's devastation. While checking the insurance policy info to distribute to the deceased's families, Ram learns that their blood groups details have been swapped and heads to the blood lab.

Ram inquires a nurse only to learn that their village corporator Gopalayya is behind Peter and the villagers' death (Peter recognized and followed one of the henchman where he finds out about Gopalayya's involvement in the murders). Gopalayya is stabbed to death by the mastermind with the help of his henchman. The henchman chases Hariprasad where he seeks Ram's help, who evade the henchman and rush to Gopalayya's house only to find him dead. Ram asks Kushi to check the death certificates of the dead people, where they learn that the people were already dead due to multi organ failure. After inquiring from another doctor, they learn that Hariprasad was supplying non-experimental medicine to the villagers.

The experiments are actually Human-trials, which is illegal and also related to medical mafia. Realizing that Hariprasad is the mastermind behind the murders, Ram, along with Rajanna lead Hariprasad and his henchman into a trap where Hariprasad divulges that he had injected viruses into 20 people for medical-trials. When the experiment resulted in disastrous reports, he decide to finish off the villagers using the henchmen, by making everyone believe that Badrinarayana is behind the murders, thus leaving no evidence tying him to the crime.

However, Ram's insurance policy had landed them in trouble. Due to this, Hariprasad had to kill Gopalayya and targeted Ram. After the confession, Ram reveals about knowing Hariprasad's involvement in medical mafia where he along with Rajanna kills the henchmen and Hariprasad. After killing Hariprasad, Rajanna tells Ram to reveal the truth about Hariprasad's ugly intentions. but Ram disagrees stating that every doctor, who are dedicating their lives to stop the COVID-19 virus will be degraded and their reputation will be spoiled, thus leaving the truth to be buried.

== Cast ==
- Anish Tejeshwar as Ramarjuna alias Ram
- Nishvika Naidu as Kushi
- Rangayana Raghu as Peter, Kushi's father
- Bala Rajwadi as Badrinarayan's henchman
- Ravi Kale as Badrinarayana
- Sharath Lohitashwa as Rajanna
- Appanna as Ram's boss
- Manjunath Gowda as Badrinarayana's henchman
- Harish Raj as Dr. Hariprasad

== Soundtrack ==
Ramarjuna

Soundtrack album by Ananda Rajavikrama
- Released: 2021
- Recorded: 2020
- Genre: Soundtrack
- Length: 17:41
- Label: Winkwhistle Production

=== Songs ===
No.	Title	Lyrics	Singer(s)	Length
1.	"Manase chooru"	Naveen Reddy G	Puneeth Rajkumar	04:19
2.	"Bloodshed of Ramarjuna"	Sai Sarvesh	Vasishta Simha	04:49
3.	"Bad Boy"	Kiran Chandra	Chandan Shetty	04:17
4.	"Oh Jeeva"	V. Nagendra Prasad	Vijay Prakash	04:16

== Release ==
The movie was released on 29 January 2021. Karthik Gowda of KRG Studios released both the Kannada and Telugu versions of the movie.

== Reception ==
=== Critical response ===
Sunayana Suresh of The Times of India gave 3/5 stars and wrote "Ramarjuna is a fun commercial entertainer if you're in the mood for one." Udayavani wrote "Anish tried to tell a common story in a thrilling way with some turn and twist. If more attention had been paid to the screenplay and if the pace of the narration had been increased a bit, Ramarjuna could have reached the audience more effectively." Asianet Suvarna News wrote "Aneesh, who has told a story that is interesting and connected to current developments, has won as a director in the very first step."

A. Sharadhaa of The New Indian Express gave 3/5 stars and wrote "Aniissh had good and sensitive content, with various subplots, however, the execution has been sensationalised with commercial aspects. With a good background score and a couple of nice songs, Ramarjuna by, for and of Aniissh makes for a decent one-time watch." The Hans India gave 2.5/5 stars and wrote "Ramarjuna could have been a little more fun-filled. Overall, the approach to the subject is very casual. The film lacks sensitive touch and loses entertaining element as the director has followed the same old mass formula."
