= Nam Areal Ond Dina =

2010 film

- VCD cover
- Directed by: Aravind Kaushik
- Produced by: Chandrachari C Ramaswamy K Rajashekar C D N Nagendra Jois
- Starring: Anish Tejeshwar; Meghana Gaonkar; Rakshit Shetty
- Cinematography: Ashok Kashyap
- Music by: Arjun Janya
- Production company: Sri Lakshmi Sai Bhairaveshwara Films
- Release date: 23 July 2010
- Running time: 133 minutes
- Country: India
- Language: Kannada

Nam Areal Ond Dina (transl. A day in our area) is a 2010 Indian Kannada-language romantic drama film directed by Aravind Kaushik and starring Anish Tejeshwar, Meghana Gaonkar, and Rakshit Shetty. The film began production in 2008 and released two years later. This film marked the acting debut of Gaonkar and Shetty and the directorial debut of Aravind Kaushik. This film was supposed to be the debut film of Tejeshwar, but Police Quarters ended up releasing first. Mandya Ramesh, Kuri Prathap, and Ravi Teja were cast in supporting roles and a song pictured on Ramesh was included in the film.

Gaonkar, Shetty, and Janya collaborated with Kaushik for his second film Tuglak (2012). An unreleased sequel titled Namma Arealli Innondu Dina (transl. Another day in our area) began production in 2012.

== Plot ==
The film is about a man, Chinna, who has no major goal in his life, runs after a girl named Chinnu. When she wants him to make Rs. 5000 a month, he manages to get the money illegally. Chinna faces more problems after he learns about Chinnu's other love interest, Aravind.

== Cast ==
- Anish Tejeshwar as Chinna
- Meghana Gaonkar as Chinnu
- Rakshit Shetty as Aravind
- Mandya Ramesh
- Kuri Prathap

== Soundtrack ==
The songs are composed by Arjun Janya. Regarding the songs, a critic from Rediff wrote that "While Nenapu is a melodious composition, the other songs -- by Arjun -- are just okay. Some of them could have been done away with".

| No. | Title | Lyrics | Singer(s) | Length |
|---|---|---|---|---|
| 1. | "Manmathana" | Arvind Kaushik | Priya Prakash | 5:00 |
| 2. | "Thalenovu" | Arvind Kaushik | Hemanth Kumar, Harsha, Arjun Janya | 5:35 |
| 3. | "Nenape" | K. Kalyan | Karthik | 5:38 |
| 4. | "Nam Areal (Bit)" | | Arjun Janya | 1:33 |
| 5. | "Jamaise" | Arvind Kaushik, Manjunath Bagade | Ranjith, Chaitra H. G. | 4:34 |
| 6. | "Kanyamani" | Arvind Kaushik | Mukesh, Ramadevi, Vijay, Divya | 4:35 |
| 7. | "Kaapaadiko" | Arvind Kaushik, Manjunath Bagade | Karthik, Shamitha Malnad | 5:39 |
| Total length: | | | | 32:34 |

== Reception ==
A critic from the Bangalore Mirror noted that "The director’s non-linear narration turns out to be the biggest asset of the film". A critic from Rediff gave the film a rating of three out of five stars and stated that "Colloquial dialogues by Arvind is another strong point. But the film could have had a better screenplay".
