= A. Vinod Bharathi =

Indian cinematographer (born 1983)

Vinod Bharathi A
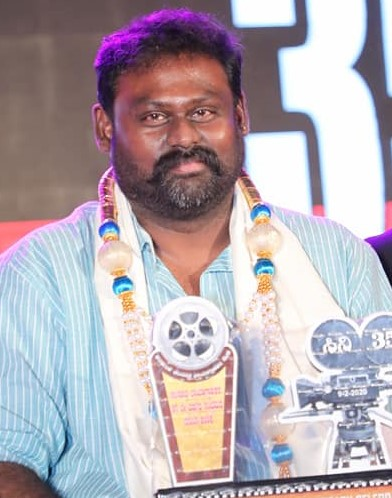
- Born: Chennai, Tamil Nadu, India
- Occupations: Cinematographer, actor
- Years active: 2009-present

Vinod Bharathi A is an Indian cinematographer who works in Tamil, Kannada and Malayalam films.

== Filmography ==
†	Denotes films that have not yet been released

Year	Title	Language	Notes
2009	Jotheyagi Hithavagi	Kannada	
2009	Dheemaku	Kannada	
2012	Gokula Krishna	Kannada	
2013	Chithiramandiradalli	Kannada	
2013	Second Innings	Malayalam	
2013	Kutteem Kolum	Malayalam	
2014	Sadagara	Kannada	
2014	Nerungi Vaa Muthamidathe	Tamil	
2016	Trataka	Kannada	
2017	Thappu Thanda	Tamil	
2018	Aa Drushya	Kannada	
2020	Dear Sathya	Kannada	
2021	Marry	Kannada	
2025	Vishnu Priya	Kannada	
2026	Sannidhanam P.O	Tamil	

=== Web series ===
Year	Title	Language	Platform	Notes
2019	Police Diary 2.0	Tamil	ZEE5	
2020	Thandhu Vitten Ennai	Tamil	ZEE5	

== Filmography ==
=== As actor ===
Year	Title	Role	Language	Notes
2018	Madura Veeran	Gurumoorthy's brother	Tamil	
2021	Yaruku Helbedi	Gundu	Kannada	
2021	Bumper	China Gurusamy	Tamil	
2023	Maruthi Nagar Police Station	Head Constable V Raju	Tamil	
2024	Hejjaaru	Bhupathi	Kannada	
2025	Nee Nange Allava	John Solomon	Kannada	
