= Aa Drushya =

2019 Indian Kannada language crime film

- Theatrical Poster
- Directed by: Shiva Ganesh
- Written by: Karthick Naren
- Based on: Dhuruvangal Pathinaaru
- Produced by: K. Manju
- Starring: V. Ravichandran
- Cinematography: A. Vinod Bharathi
- Edited by: Suresh Aarumugam
- Music by: Gautam Srivastaa
- Production company: K.Manju Cinemas
- Release date: 8 November 2019
- Running time: 122 minutes
- Country: India
- Language: Kannada

Aa Drushya is a 2019 Indian Kannada language neo-noir crime thriller written by Karthick Naren and directed by Shiva Ganesh. The film is produced by K. Manju under his banner K Manju Cinemas. It features V. Ravichandran in the lead role The supporting cast includes Achyuth Kumar, Ramesh Bhat and Chaithra J Achar. The score and soundtrack for the film is by Gautam Srivastaa and the cinematography is by A. Vinod Bharathi. The editing of the film is done by Suresh Arumugam. The film is a remake of the 2016 Tamil film Dhuruvangal Pathinaaru starring Rahman in the lead role.

== Plot ==
The story begins with Deepak narrating the story of one of his cases that occurred during his service as a police officer in Coimbatore. Deepak narrates the story to a man who is the son of another police officer who has come for taking career advice from him. Three young men - Fabian, Mano and Melvin - hit a man with the car they were driving on a rainy day in a neighborhood. Afraid that they might get caught, they carry the body to their home. Deepak continues the story from his perspective. He comes to his office in the morning and his subordinate officer informs him about the suicide of a person named Krish that has happened in the area and hands over the license of that person. The informer, who is a paperboy, is called in to give his information. On his way out, the paperboy sees the car from the crime scene and shouts out to the police, but they ignore him.

Deepak visits the crime scene and meets the new police officer, Gautham. Gautham follows his instinct and mentions those young men. They go to investigate them and act suspiciously. After finding nothing, they return to the office. While on their way, they get a call informing them of another incident. They go there to find that Shruti is missing and there are bloodstains in her bedroom. Her friend Vaishnavi was the one to identify this. Later, Deepak gets a call saying that the previous day's evening, Shruti had filed a complained against someone called Mano. Deepak recognizes the name as that of one of the young men and interrogates them. They tell of the incident that happened 10 days prior to missing of Shruti. The incident was - she unknowingly over speeds and nearly hits them. The three young men also confess that after the incident, they have not met her. On further investigation in Shruti's apartment, it is revealed that the blood group is B+, which matches with Krish.

Gautham investigates and identifies that Shruti had told the neighbor about a young man who is her fiancé. They decide that the fiancé might be Krish and decide to watch the young men as suspects. As the day ends, Deepak decides to go home. His neighbor informs him about a young man who was waiting for him. Deepak had captured a camera from some kids. These kids were asked to meet him at his residence for getting back the camera. From the camera, Deepak sees that Vaishnavi has lied about arriving late to the house, while she was there earlier. He also notices the car number from the video. Both Gautham and Deepak decide to check on Vaishnavi, but they realize that she is missing from her house. They go looking for her everywhere but she is not found. She is then shown to be at the airport. Gautham and Deepak come to the conclusion that one among the young boys might have been the suspect and that Shruti would have given a complaint against the one whose name she would have confused with. After this conclusion, they see Mano (one among the three young boys) on the road on his way to the police station.

To Deepak and Gautham, Mano narrates the incident of how they hit the man while driving the car, and later carrying the body and finally realizing that the body was taken by the original killer. He confesses this to the police and says that the paperboy who saw them hit the man has been asking for ransom and threatening them. The paperboy explains to the police that on the day of the incidence, he saw a man with a bullet wound who had apparently committed suicide and another case where the car hit a man. Gautham and Deepak hypothesize the situation by narrating a story: Both Krish and Shruti are in the apartment and then the anonymous killer breaks in and kidnaps Shruti, Krish, and Vaishnavi's assumed boyfriend and threatens Vaishnavi. While trying to escape, Krish is killed. Vaishnavi's boyfriend (assumed) also escapes and is hit by the car and killed. But they are not sure of the story. They get a lead that a guy is throwing a dead body near the outskirts and go there. Finally, they see the car number and follows it. But Gautham and Deepak meet with an accident. Deepak's left foot is amputated, and he retires from the force.

After narrating this much, Deepak asks the other man to whom he was narrating the story whether he still wants to be in the police. Deepak excuses himself into the house. While he is there, he realises that the person with whom he was conversing is not whom he thought. He becomes cautious and takes his pistol.

When Deepak meets the other man at the lawn table, the other man points his pistol at Deepak and reveals himself to be Gowtham. Gowtham had suffered burns from the accident and was comatose for five years. Due to his burn injuries, he had been permanently relieved from field duty, and his voice also changed. His face was also reconstructed due to burns. When Gowtham decided to meet Deepak to solve his only field case, he had seen the killer leaving Deepak's home, after meeting Deepak. Shocked, Gowtham had posed as someone else and all led to that moment. Meanwhile, Deepak's staff call in the police, and Gautham is about to be nabbed. He asks Deepak about the killer, and Deepak reveals the killer as his own Son Rajiv.

The true incident is revealed: It was Shruti's birthday. Vaishnavi and Shruti's boyfriend Rajiv come home early to surprise her. Krish, faking his name is Mano, comes inside the apartment with his friend, rapes her, and shoots the same in their phone. He is the same guy against whom Shruti has filed an eve-teasing complaint. They later take Shruti with them and Rajiv chases them. Near the park, Rajiv fights and kills Krish and the other one while trying to run from Rajiv is hit in the car by three young men. Rajiv asks Vaishnavi to report that Shruti is missing. Rajiv later takes Shruti and Vaishnavi back to Nashik to save them. He takes the other guy's body from the three young men's (Fabian, Mano and Melvin) car to take his phone where they recorded Shruti's rape.

After the accident, Vaishnavi comes to Deepak to tell him what happened. Deepak is shot by Gowtham and dies, while Gowtham is killed by police fire. He says he saved his son, but now can die without guilt.

== Cast ==
- V. Ravichandran as Inspector Surya tej
- Ramesh Bhat
- Achyuth Kumar as Rajanna
- Yash Shetty
- Chethan Vickky
- Arjun Gowda
- Nisarga
- Chaithra J Achar as Asha
- Girirsh as Samarth

== Production and release ==
The film was first slated to release on 18 November 2019, but was moved to the earlier date of 8 November.

== Soundtrack ==
Aa Drushya

Soundtrack album by Gautam Srivastaa
- Genre: Feature film soundtrack
- Language: Kannada
- Label: D- Beats
- Producer: K. Manju

The film's background score and the soundtracks are composed by Gautam Srivasataa and written by V. Nagendra Prasad. The music rights were acquired by D-Beats

- Excuse Me - Madhu Balakrishnan

== Critical reception ==
The Times of India paper gave 3.5/5 and wrote "Aa Drushya not only manages to entertain and engage those who have not seen the original, but it also proves to be a worthwhile watch for those who have seen Dhruvangal Pathinaaru too. This is where the makers of the film have succeeded. If remakes of good films from other industries are delivered like this, one can confidently ask for more."

The Bangalore Mirror gave 3.5/5 and wrote " Ravichandran's parade of characters fill up the narrative in overall story"

The New Indian Express gave 3/5 and wrote "Aa Drushya can be a thrilling watch for all those who want to see the mystery, keeping in focus Crazy Star Ravichandran."
