= Archana Kottige =

South Indian actress

- Born: Bengaluru, Karnataka, India
- Occupation: Actress
- Years active: 2018–present
- Spouse: BR Sharath (m. 2025)

Archana Kottige is an Indian actress, based in Bangalore and primarily works in Kannada Films. She is known for the films like Dear Sathya, Yellow Gangs, Vijayanand, Hostel Hudugaru Bekagiddare and Hondisi Bareyiri.

== Early life and education ==
Archana Kottige was in Bengaluru, Karnataka, India. She did her schooling from Bengaluru and completed her graduation from Christ University. She also studied digital film making course from LV Prasad film academy.

== Personal life ==
Archana married her longtime boyfriend, cricketer BR Sharath, on 23 April 2025 in an intimate ceremony in Bangalore.

== Career ==
Archana Kottige started her career in 2018 with the Kannada film 'Aranyakanda' and then acted in Vaasu Naan Pakka Commercial. In 2022 she had six releases namely Dear Sathya, Triple Riding, Cutting Shop, Yellow Gangs, Made in Bengaluru and Vijayanand.

In 2023 she appeared in a brief role as Smitha in Hostel Hudugaru Bekagiddare and as Bhanu in Hondisi Bareyiri. Her performance in both the films were well received and appreciated. She also appeared in the 2023 movie Bayaluseeme and 2024 movie Jugalbandi. She received appreciation for her characters in both the movies. She will also be making her debut in Malayalam cinema with the film Shesha. She will play an antagonist with the role of police officer ASI Geetha in the film. Archana's upcoming movies include Ellara Kaaleliyatte Kaala, Shabari Searching for Raavana, Alankar Vidyarthi, Raktaksha among others.

== Filmography ==
=== Films ===
Key
†	Denotes films that have not yet been released

Year	Title	Role	Notes
2018	Aranyakanda	Suguna	
2018	Vaasu Naan Pakka Commercial	Sandhya	
2022	Dear Sathya	Anjali	
2022	Cutting Shop	Deepa	
2022	Yellow Gangs	Priya	
2022	Triple Riding	Rashmika	
2022	Vijayanand	Vani Sankeshwar	
2022	Made in Bengaluru	Rachana	
2023	Hondisi Bareyiri	Bhanu	
2023	Hostel Hudugaru Bekagiddare	Smitha	
2024	Jugalbandhi	Middle-class girl	
2025	Forest	Meenakshi	
2025	Mark	Sharanya	
2026	Rakkasapuradhol	Parvathi	
2026	Shesha 2016	Geetha	
2026	Elra Kaaleliyatte Kaala	Vasantha	

=== Television ===
Year	Title	Role	Network	Notes	Refs.
2022	Honeymoon	Jyothi	Jio Cinema and AHA		
2025	Ayyana Mane	Charulatha	ZEE5		

==== Music videos ====
Year	Title	Composer	Notes
2019	Friendzone	Hemanth Jois	Special appearance
