= Nishvika Naidu =

Indian actress

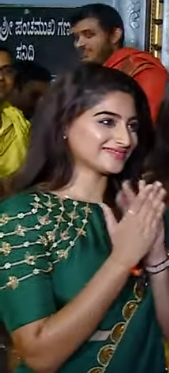
- Naidu in 2019
- Born: 19 May 1996 (age 30); Bangalore, Karnataka, India
- Education: Mount Carmel College, Bangalore
- Occupation: Actress
- Years active: 2018–present

Nishvika Naidu is an Indian actress who primarily works in Kannada films. Naidu made her acting debut with the 2018 film Amma I Love You, which became her breakthrough. She has received commercial success with Gentleman (2020), Sakath (2021), Dilpasand (2023) and Karataka Damanaka (2024).

== Early life ==
Nishvika was born in Bangalore, Karnataka, India to a Telugu-speaking family. She is a graduate in Psychology from Mount Carmel College, Bangalore.

== Career ==
Naidu made her debut with the 2018 film Amma I Love You opposite Chiranjeevi Sarja, which was her breakthrough. Vaasu Naan Pakka Commercial opposite Anish Tejeshwar was her second film. Her next film was Padde Huli opposite Shreyas K Manju. It was followed by Jadesh Kumar's Gentlemen where she was paired opposite Prajwal Devaraj. The film earned her recognition. She also appeared in Chandan Shetty's music video Party Freak.

In 2021, Naidu reunited with Anish Tejeshwar in his directoral debut Ramarjuna. Naidu has three film releases in 2022 – Yograj Bhat's Gaalipata 2, Jadeshaa K Hampi's Guru Shishyaru and Shivatejass's Dilpasand opposite Krishna. In 2024, Naidu appeared in Karataka Damanaka alongside Shiva Rajkumar and Prabhu Deva.

== Media image ==
In the Bangalore Times Most Desirable Women list, Naidu was placed 22nd in 2018, 29th in 2019 and 6th in 2020.

== Filmography ==
Key
†	Denotes films that have not yet been released

=== Films ===
Year	Title	Role	Notes	Ref.
2018	Amma I Love You	Bindu		
2018	Vaasu Naan Pakka Commercial	Mahalakshmi		
2019	Padde Huli	Sangeetha		
2020	Gentleman	Tapaswini		
2021	Ramarjuna	Khushi Peter		
2021	Sakath	Nakshatra		
2022	Gaalipata 2	Nishvika	Cameo appearance	
2022	Guru Shishyaru	Sujatha "Sooji"		
2022	Dilpasand	Aishwarya		
2023	Garadi	Herself	Special appearance in song "Hodirale Halagi"	
2024	Karataka Damanaka	Kempi		
2025	Marutha			
2025	Mark	Herself	Special appearance in song "Mast Malaika"	

=== Television ===
Year	Title	Role	Network	Ref.
2024	Mahanati	Judge	Zee Kannada	

=== Music video ===
Year	Title	Singer	Ref.
2020	Party Freak	Chandan Shetty	

== Awards and nominations ==
Year	Film	Award	Category	Result	Ref.
2019	Amma I Love You	66th Filmfare Awards South	Best Actress Kannada	Nominated	
2019	Amma I Love You	8th South Indian International Movie Awards	Best Female Debut – Kannada	Nominated	
2021	Gentlemen	9th South Indian International Movie Awards	Best Actress Kannada	Nominated	
2022	Sakath	10th South Indian International Movie Awards	Best Actress Kannada	Nominated	
