= Jai Bajarangabali =

2014 Indian Kannada-language film

- Official poster
- Directed by: Ravivarma Gubbi
- Written by: Ravivarma Gubbi
- Produced by: S. T. Vijay Paulraj
- Starring: Ajai Rao; Sindhu Loknath
- Cinematography: V. Venkatesh
- Edited by: Ganesh M.
- Music by: V. Harikrishna
- Release date: 12 December 2014
- Country: India
- Language: Kannada

Jai Bajarangabali (transl. Hail Hanuman) is a 2014 Indian Kannada-language action drama film directed by Ravivarma Gubbi and starring Ajai Rao and Sindhu Loknath.

== Cast ==
- Ajai Rao as Ajju
- Sindhu Loknath as Ambuja
- Anant Nag
- Shobharaj
- P. Ravishankar
- Tennis Krishna
- Bullet Prakash
- Adi Lokesh

== Production ==
The film began production in 2012. This is Ajai Rao's first action film and he plays a Hanuman devotee. Shubha Phutela, who was shooting for Maalai Pozhudhin Mayakathilaey (2016), opted out of the film since the producers of Jai Bajarangabali wanted her to shoot exclusively for the film. Sindhu Loknath plays a non-resident Indian in the film and worked on this film around the same time as Love in Mandya (2014). The film was shot in Bangalore and Kuala Lumpur.

== Soundtrack ==
The music is composed by V. Harikrishna.

- "Hrudayada Battery" - Sonu Nigam
- "Endendu Ninagaagi" - Tippu
- "Ramsami" - V. Harikrishna

== Reception ==
A critic from The Times of India gave the film a rating of three out of film and praised the direction, the performance of the cast, the dialogues, the music and the cinematography. A critic from Bangalore Mirror opined that "Jai Bhajaranga Bali is still one of those films that will not make you want to run away from theatre".
