= Ambar Caterers =

- Directed by: Jaiprasad Bajal
- Produced by: Kadandale Suresh Bhandary
- Starring: Saurabh S Bhandary; Sindhu Loknath; Sharath Lohitashwa; Bharathi Vishnuvardhan; Naveen D Padil; Bhojaraj Vamanjoor; Sundar Rai Mandara; Aravind Bolar
- Cinematography: Santhosh Rai Pathaje
- Music by: Manikanth Kadri
- Production company: Nageshwara Cine Creations
- Release date: 24 November 2017
- Country: India
- Language: Tulu
- Box office: ₹1 crore

Ambar Caterers is a 2017 Indian Tulu-language comedy drama film directed by Jaiprasad Bajal, Starring Saurabh S Bhandary and Sindhu Loknath in lead roles. The movie has been produced by Kadandale Suresh Bhandary. The movie was released on 24 November 2017. The film was a box office success and ran for 50 days. After the film's success, it was screened at a Mumbai theatre.

== Cast ==
- Saurabh S Bhandary
- Sindhu Loknath
- Bharathi Vishnuvardhan
- Sharath Lohitashwa
- Bank Janardhan
- Naveen D Padil
- Bhojaraj Vamanjoor
- Aravind Bolar
- Sathish Bandale
- Sunder Rai Mandara
- Sunethra Pandit
- Manju Muloor

== Soundtrack ==
Ambar Caterers

Soundtrack album by Manikanth Kadri
- Genre: Feature film soundtrack
- Label: Nageshwara Audio

The soundtrack of the film was composed by Manikanth Kadri. The soundtrack album was released on 29 September 2017.

Track listing
No.	Title	Lyrics	Singer(s)	Length
1.	"Jai Hanuman"	Vijaykumar Kodialbail	Shankar Mahadevan
2.	"Kanatonji Kanane"	Jaiprasad Bajal	Nakul Abhyankar, Anuradha Bhat
3.	"Dennana Dennana"	Jaiprasad Bajal	Sangeetha Ravindranath, Manikanth Kadri
4.	"Linguna Pullina"	Nithin Bangera	Vismaya Vinayak
