= Akira (2016 Kannada film) =

- Theatrical release poster
- Directed by: Naveen Reddy
- Written by: Naveen Reddy
- Produced by: Chethan; Srikanth Prasanna; SS Reddy Marasuru
- Starring: Anish Tejeshwar; Aditi Rao; Krishi Thapanda; Rangayana Raghu
- Cinematography: Yogi
- Edited by: Srikanth
- Music by: B. Ajaneesh Loknath
- Production company: S2 Entertainment
- Distributed by: Chandan Films
- Release date: 6 May 2016
- Running time: 134 minutes
- Country: India
- Language: Kannada

Akira is a 2016 Indian Kannada romantic drama film directed by Naveen Reddy and produced by S2 Entertainments. The film stars Anish Tejeshwar, Aditi Rao and Krishi Tapanda in lead roles. The film was released to mixed reviews.

== Plot summary ==
The movie revolves around Akhil's (Anish Tesjeshwar) life, who is dwelling upon his life and his trysts with love. Disturbed and shaken after he gets dumped by Sahithi (Aditi Rao), Akhil (Anish Tejeshwar) meets Lavanya (Krishi Thapanda), who has recently broken up as well. Akhil and Lavanya start to delevop feelings for one another. Things take a turn when he learns that Sahithi and Lavanya are best friends.

== Cast ==
- Anish Tejeshwar as Akhil Raj a.k.a. Akira
- Aditi Rao as Saahithi
- Krishi Tapanda as Lavanya
- Avinash as Akhil's Father
- Rangayana Raghu as Gun Guddappa
- Bullet Prakash
- Sindhu Loknath in a cameo appearance

== Soundtrack ==
Akira

Soundtrack album by B. Ajaneesh Loknath
- Released: 11 March 2016
- Recorded: 2015
- Genre: Feature film soundtrack
- Label: Anand Audio
- Producer: B. Ajaneesh Loknath

B. Ajaneesh Loknath chronology
Ishtakamya (2016)	Akira (2016)	Mummy (2016)

B. Ajaneesh Loknath has composed the music for five songs for which Dhananjay Ranjan, Suni, V. Nagendra Prasad and Chetan have penned the lyrics. Actors Puneeth Rajkumar and Vijay Raghavendra have rendered their voices for a song each. One of the songs was shot in Norway.

Track listing
No.	Title	Lyrics	Singer(s)	Length
1.	"Hey Hudugaru Yella"	Santhu	B. Ajaneesh Loknath
2.	"Kanna Sanneyindale"	Dhananjay Ranjan	Puneeth Rajkumar
3.	"Nam Arealondina"	G. Naveen Reddy	Vijay Prakash
4.	"Godu Godu Bandavane Nodu"	V. Nagendra Prasad	Naveen Sajju
5.	"Yetthakondu Hogu Maga"	G. Naveen Reddy	Vijay Prakash, C. R. Bobby
6.	"Mincho Mincho"	Chethan	B. Ajaneesh Loknath, C. R. Bobby
7.	"Aliside Usiragide"	Dhananjay Ranjan	Vijay Raghavendra

== Reception ==
Sunayana Suresh of The Times of India rated the film 2.5/5 stars and wrote, " The film scores big on production values [...] Unfortunately, the film wanders too much in trying to satisfy the commercial audiences that the essence is lost. A little more tautness in the screenplay might have been the order". Shyam Prasad S of Bangalore Mirror wrote, "Akira is boring at best and a sleeping tablet at its worst". A critic from Filmfare wrote, "With good turns and twists, the movie makes a perfect story for young love birds. Perhaps, the director could have cut down on dance sequences to keep the pace quick".
