= Gentleman (2020 film) =

Indian Kannada crime-action film by Jadesh Kumar

- Film poster
- Directed by: Jadesh Kumar Hampi
- Written by: Jadesh Kumar Hampi; Santosh SK
- Produced by: Guru Deshpande
- Starring: Prajwal Devraj; Nishvika Naidu; Sanchari Vijay
- Cinematography: Aroor Sudhakar Shetty
- Edited by: Venkatesh UDV
- Music by: B. Ajaneesh Loknath
- Production company: Guru Deshpande Productions (G Cinemas)
- Release date: 7 February 2020
- Running time: 144 minutes
- Country: India
- Language: Kannada

Gentleman is a 2020 Indian Kannada-language action thriller film co-written and directed by Jadesh Kumar Hampi in his directorial debut, and produced by Guru Deshpande under his banner Guru Deshpande Productions (G Cinemas). It features Prajwal Devraj and Nishvika Naidu along with Sanchari Vijay in the lead roles.

Gentleman was released on 7 February 2020 and received positive reviews from critics.

== Plot ==
Bharath Kumar, who works in an electronics showroom, suffers from sleeping beauty syndrome, which is said to occur in one among a million people. It makes one fall asleep for 18 hours a day, leaving just 6 hours for the rest of their activities, including work. Bharath's family consist of his brother, sister-in-law, and their daughter Varu. One night, Bharath's brother and sister-in-law die in an accident. Due to Bharath's condition, he cannot care for Varu, which leads him to send her to an orphanage.

However, she is brought back by Tapaswini, who is Bharath's ex-girlfriend and promises to take care of her. They spend time together and also travel to Wonderla, but Varu goes missing while she is playing in Wonderla. Worried, Bharath and Tapaswini lodges a complaint to the police. ACP Shivamurthy, along with Constable Nagappa takes charge of the investigation and along with Bharath. They find clues leading to a person named Nani, However, he is declared dead which leads the case to a dead end. Bharath investigates the case himself.

At night, Bharath hears a man named Johnny reciting a song Chikki Chikki Chikkappa, Chochlategintha sweetappa.. Chikki Chikki Chikkappa, nidde enda ellappa which was sung by Varu to Bharath. Bharath chases Johnny, who escapes due to Bharath's Syndrome. Bharath, along with Shivamurthy arrives at Johnny's house. After a thorough search, he finds a medicine sticker which was found at his brother's shirt. After meeting with Tapasvini's senior, He learns that the medicine is used for women egg scam purposes. After interrogating the medicine supplier.

Bharath finds that Dr.Swaminathan Rai is the main mastermind behind the scam. With the help of Shivamurthy's contacts with the Police Control station and Nagappa, He tracks the ambulance, which leads to a hideout where the girls are kept, but he is knocked out by the henchman and taken to Swaminathan, where Swaminathan reveals that he killed his brother and sister-in-law after a girl in their hideout escapes and had requested them to take her to police station. Enraged, Bharath kills Swami and his henchmen, where Swami divulges that Shivamurthy was the one who informed Swaminathan about Bharath. Bharath reaches Johnny's hideout where he and Shivamurthy engage in close-combat, the former is weakened.

Later, Shivamurthy explains that he was the one who hired Nani (who was his friend) to kidnap Varu, but was killed by Johnny, who humiliated him in the past and took Varu as revenge (who thought that Varu is Nani's daughter). Shivamurthy kidnapped Varu as he is in need to help his daughter, who is suffering from heart problem and needs a rare blood group: Bombay Blood group. When he finds that Varu is also having the same blood group, He decide to have her heart transplanted into her daughter illegally. As Shivamurthy is about to kill Bharath. Varu arrives and calls Bharath, who awakens and knocks out Shivamurthy, where he and Varu emotionally reconcile with each other.

== Cast ==
- Prajwal Devaraj as Bharath
- Nishvika Naidu as Tapasswini
- Sanchari Vijay as Inspector Shivmurthy
- Arjun Ramesh as Doctor Swaminathan Rai
- Prashanth Siddi as Johnny
- Aradhya N. Chandra as Bharath's niece
- Bharath Kalyan as Bharat's brother
- Vijay Chendoor as Auto-Driver
- Tabala Nani as Traffic inspector
- Govinde Gowda as Constable Nagappa
- Aruna Balraj as Tapasswini's mother
- Hanumanthegowda as Tapasswini's father

== Soundtrack ==
Gentlemen

Soundtrack album by B. Ajaneesh Loknath
- Released: 2020
- Recorded: 2019
- Genre: Feature film soundtrack
- Length: 12:34
- Language: Kannada
- Label: Anand Audio
- Producer: B. Ajaneesh Loknath

B. Ajaneesh Loknath chronology
| Dia (2020) | Gentlemen (2020) | Hero (2021) |

The film's background score and the soundtracks are composed by B.Ajaneesh Loknath. The music rights were acquired by Ananda Audio.

Tracklist
| No. | Title | Lyrics | Singer(s) | Length |
|---|---|---|---|---|
| 1. | "Nadagutide" | Dhananjay Didiga | Vasishta N. Simha | 3:12 |
| 2. | "Arare Shuruvayithu Hege" | Jayanth Kaikini | Vijay Prakash | 2:54 |
| 3. | "Yeddelo Bharathiya" | Yograj Bhat | Anthony Daasan | 3:27 |
| 4. | "Marali Manasaagide" | Nagarjun Sharma, Kinnal Raj | Sanjith Hegde, C. R. Bobby | 3:01 |
| Total length: | | | | 12:34 |

== Production ==
The principal photography of the film was held on 25 October 2018. The film had Prajwal Devraj in the lead and Nishvika Naidu as female lead. The team later had Ajaneesh Loknath to score background score for the film. The second schedule of the movie was started on 6 May 2019

== Release ==
The film released its first look poster on 4 July 2018 on account of the actor's birthday the first song of the film was released on 27 December 2019. Second song from the film was out on 16 January 2020 The trailer of the film was released by Puneeth Rajkumar and Dhruva Sarja on 6 January 2020. The film's wake up theme song sung by Anthony Daasan was released on 27 January 2019. Before the release the film had sold its Tamil and Telugu remake rights. The film was released on 7 February 2020.

== Awards and nominations ==
| Award | Category | Recipient | Result | Ref. |
|---|---|---|---|---|
| 2nd Chandanavana Film Critics Academy Awards | Best Film | Guru Deshpande | Nominated | |
| 2nd Chandanavana Film Critics Academy Awards | Best Actor | Prajwal Devaraj | Nominated | |
| 2nd Chandanavana Film Critics Academy Awards | Best Supporting Actor | Sanchari Vijay | Nominated | |
| 2nd Chandanavana Film Critics Academy Awards | Best Child Actor | Aradhya N Chandru | Won | |
| 2nd Chandanavana Film Critics Academy Awards | Best Screenplay | Jadesh Kumar Hampi | Nominated | |
| 2nd Chandanavana Film Critics Academy Awards | Best Music Director | B. Ajaneesh Loknath | Nominated | |
| 2nd Chandanavana Film Critics Academy Awards | Best Background Music | B. Ajaneesh Loknath (share with Dia) | Won | |
| 2nd Chandanavana Film Critics Academy Awards | Best Male Singer | Sanjith Hegde ("Marali Manasaagide") | Won | |
| 2nd Chandanavana Film Critics Academy Awards | Best Male Singer | Vijay Prakash ("Arare Shuruvayithu Hege") | Nominated | |
| 2nd Chandanavana Film Critics Academy Awards | Best Female Singer | CR Baachi ("Marali Manasaagide") | Nominated | |
| 2nd Chandanavana Film Critics Academy Awards | Best Lyrics | Nagarjuna Sharma; Kinnal Raj ("Marali Manasaagide") | Won | |
| 2nd Chandanavana Film Critics Academy Awards | Best Cinematography | Aroor Sudhakar Shetty | Nominated | |
| 2nd Chandanavana Film Critics Academy Awards | Best Stunt | Different Danny; Vinod | Nominated | |
| 10th South Indian International Movie Awards | Best Actor | Prajwal Devaraj | Nominated | |
| 10th South Indian International Movie Awards | Best Actress | Nishvika Naidu | Nominated | |
| 10th South Indian International Movie Awards | Best Actor in a Negative Role | Arjun Ramesh | Nominated | |
| 10th South Indian International Movie Awards | Best Debut Producer | Guru Deshpande Production | Nominated | |
| 10th South Indian International Movie Awards | Best Lyricist | Nagarjuna Sharma & Kinnal Raj | Nominated | |
| 10th South Indian International Movie Awards | Best Male Playback Singer | Sanjith Hegde | Won | |
| 10th South Indian International Movie Awards | Best Actor- Critics Choice - Kannada | Prajwal Devaraj | Won | |
| 67th Filmfare Awards South | Best Director | Jadesh Kumar Hampi | Nominated | |
| 67th Filmfare Awards South | Best Actor | Prajwal Devaraj | Nominated | |
| 67th Filmfare Awards South | Best Supporting Actor | Sanchari Vijay | Nominated | |
| 67th Filmfare Awards South | Best Music Director | B. Ajaneesh Loknath | Nominated | |
