= Vinayaka Geleyara Balaga =

- Theatrical poster
- Directed by: V. Nagendra Prasad
- Written by: V. Nagendra Prasad
- Produced by: Pampapath & Nagendra Prasad
- Starring: Vijay Raghavendra; Naveen Krishna; Meghana Gaonkar
- Cinematography: 'Safety' Prakash
- Music by: V. Harikrishna
- Distributed by: Ashwini Media Networks
- Release date: 15 July 2011
- Country: India
- Language: Kannada

Vinayaka Geleyara Balaga (Kannada: ವಿನಾಯಕ ಗೆಳೆಯರ ಬಳಗ) is a 2011 Kannada movie starring Vijay Raghavendra, Naveen Krishna and Meghana Gaonkar. It is based on a real-life incident in Bangalore's Prakash Nagar in 1985. It is directed by V. Nagendra Prasad. V. Harikrishna has composed the music and 'Safety' Prakash is the cinematographer.

== Cast ==
- Vijay Raghavendra as Viji
- Naveen Krishna
- Meghana Gaonkar
- Petrol Prasanna
- Kuri Prathap
- Shobaraj
- Rangayana Raghu
- Chi. Guru Dutt

== Music ==
Vinayaka Geleyara Balaga

Soundtrack album by V. Harikrishna
- Released: 2011
- Recorded: 2011
- Genre: Feature film soundtrack
- Length: 27:02
- Language: Kannada

Official audio
- Vinayaka Geleyara Balaga – Full Album on YouTube

Track listing
No.	Title	Singer(s)	Length
1.	"Yaarivalee Hudugi"	P. Unnikrishnan, Vani Harikrishna	4:06
2.	"Ayyayyo Ammammo"	Rita	4:44
3.	"Ondinchu Kannalli"	Vijay Prakash, K. S. Chithra	4:19
4.	"Ganeshanige Garike"	Vijay Raghavendra, Naveen Krishna, Shashank Sheshagiri	4:26
5.	"Yaarivalee Hudugi"	Vijay Raghavendra	4:06
6.	"Vakratunda Mahakaya"	Shankar Mahadevan, Madhu Balakrishnan, Priya Himesh	6:01
Total length:			27:02

== Reception ==
=== Critical response ===
A critic from The New Indian Express wrote "This leads to a clash between the friends and the goonda. However, they use their brain and put the rowdy behind bars. The Ganesh Utsav happens successfully but then Razor Raja comes out on bail and he decides to take revenge. What happens after that forms the rest of the story". A critic from News18 India wrote "Hari Krishna composes three fantastic songs including the much popular 'Yaarivali Hudugi' and the devotional number 'Vakrathunda'. Malavalli Sai Krishna has written funny and catchy dialogues. 'Vinayaka Geleyara Balaga' is a thoroughly enjoyable fare". Shreyas Nag from Deccan Herald wrote "Vinayaka Geleyara Balaga is an absolute mass entertainer for the ones with a liking for spending time and money for everything except devotion at the time of festivals".
