= Jeeva (2009 film) =

2009 Kannada language film

- Film poster
- Directed by: Prabhu Srinivas
- Written by: Prabhu Srinivas
- Screenplay by: Prabhu Srinivas
- Story by: Prabhu Srinivas
- Produced by: Premkumar
- Starring: Prajwal Devaraj; Ruthuva
- Cinematography: Sabha Kumar
- Edited by: P. Sai Suresh
- Music by: Gurukiran
- Production company: P2 Productions
- Release date: 27 November 2009 (India)
- Running time: 135 min
- Country: India
- Language: Kannada

Jeeva is a 2009 Kannada language film produced by Prabhu Srinivas, who also produces the film along with cinematographer Premkumar and art director Mohan B. Kere under the banner of P2 Productions. The film was released on 27 November 2009. The film stars Prajwal Devaraj and Ruthuva in the lead roles.

== Cast ==
- Prajwal Devaraj as Jeeva
- Ruthuva as Jayanthi
- Cudavalli Chandrashekar
- Rangayana Raghu
- Chi. Guru Dutt
- Ganesh Rao Kesarkar
- Kishore
- Yashavanth
- Vardhan
- Yuvaraj
- Chandru
- Rangaswamy K. R.
- Dr Uday
- Malathi Shivanag
- Shraddha Sharma as an item number "Barakku Obama Kiruku Osama"

== Soundtrack ==
The music to this movie is played by Gurukiran and songs have been recorded by Pallavi Digital Studio, Audio rights was bought by Manoranjan Audio

No.	Title	Lyrics	Singer(s)	Length
1.	"Ley Ley Navadona Baa Lagori"	Hrudaya Shiva	Hemanth Kumar
2.	"Selade Heegeke"	Kaviraj	Krish
3.	"Summane Yaake Bande"	Kaviraj	Sonu Nigam, Shruthi
4.	"Beke Beku Nange Neene Beku"	Santhosh Nayak	Gurukiran
5.	"Beke Beku Nange Neene Beku"	Santhosh Nayak	Kunal Ganjawala
6.	"Barakku Obama Kiriku Osama"	Thushar Ranganath	Divya Shimoga	3:25

== Reception ==
R G Vijayasarathy of Rediff.com scored the film at 2.5 out of 5 stars and wrote "Prajwal Devaraj makes a serious effort to portray his character well. Certainly this film is the best in his career so far. Newbie actress Ruthwa looks good on screen and has potential. Veteran artists Chandrashekhar and Gurudatt have acted well. Watch Jeeva for Prajwal's neat performance and Guru Kiran's music". A critic from The New Indian Express wrote "Guru Kiran has provided good music. Rangayana Raghu has provided good support but Chandrasekhar fails to impress. It is a worthy watch for those who love action-oriented films". BSS from Deccan Herald wrote "But several stupid mistakes show that the director has tried to play safe and appease one and all. Saisuresh’s scissors must be credited for saving the film from turning into another insipid and mediocre fare. ‘Jeeva’ lacks life, but Ruthwa and Prajwal are not bad at all". A critic from Bangalore Mirror wrote "Rutva lacks the charm of a leading lady and Chandrashekar exaggerates. Gurukiran brings melody to some songs but is not above the ordinary, just like the film. Jeeva lacks the magic of cinema and is just another piece of exposed film".
