= Galaate =

- Promotional poster
- Directed by: M. D. Sridhar
- Written by: M. D. Sridhar
- Produced by: A. M. Rajendra Kumar
- Starring: Prajwal Devaraj; Kriti Kharbanda; Shashikumar; Tara
- Cinematography: Krishna Kumar
- Edited by: P. R. Sounder Rajan
- Music by: Jassie Gift
- Production company: AMR Productions
- Release date: 11 January 2013
- Country: India
- Language: Kannada

Galaate is a 2013 Indian Kannada-language romantic comedy film written and directed by M. D. Sridhar. The film stars Prajwal Devaraj, Kriti Kharbanda, and Hardhika Shetty in the lead roles, with Shashikumar and Tara in supporting roles. The music was composed by Jassie Gift, and the cinematography was handled by A. V. Krishna Kumar. Produced by A. M. Rajendra Kumar under AMR Productions, the film was released on 11 January 2013 and was later dubbed into Hindi as Ek Aur Yudh.

== Plot ==
Galaate follows Abhi (Prajwal Devaraj), a carefree young man in Bengaluru, who falls in love with Ankitha (Kriti Kharbanda), a lively and independent girl. Their romance faces challenges due to misunderstandings and interference from Shalini (Hardhika Shetty), who has feelings for Abhi. As Abhi tries to win Ankitha’s heart, he gets entangled in a series of comedic situations involving his friends and family, including his parents (played by Shashikumar and Tara). The story unfolds with humorous twists, leading to a chaotic climax where Abhi must resolve the confusion and prove his love for Ankitha.

== Cast ==
- Prajwal Devaraj as Abhi
- Kriti Kharbanda as Ankitha
- Hardhika Shetty as Shalini
- Shashikumar
- Tara
- Suman Ranganathan
- Shobaraj
- Tennis Krishna
- Tilak Shekar

== Soundtrack ==
Galaate

Soundtrack album by Jassie Gift
- Released: 2013
- Recorded: 2013
- Genre: Feature film soundtrack
- Length: 21:14
- Language: Kannada

Official audio
- Galaate - Full Album on YouTube

The film's music was composed by Jassie Gift. The soundtrack album consists of six tracks with a total runtime of 21 minutes and 14 seconds.

Track listing
| No. | Title | Singer(s) | Length |
|---|---|---|---|
| 1. | "Buddhi Illa" | Sonu Nigam | 3:36 |
| 2. | "Yenu Maayada" | Karthik | 4:11 |
| 3. | "Summane Idde Naanu" | Chetan Sosca, Anuradha Bhat | 3:28 |
| 4. | "Manasaare" | Shreya Ghoshal | 3:59 |
| 5. | "Muddada Nageya" | Kalpana Raghavendar, Jassie Gift, Santhosh | 3:44 |
| 6. | "Buddhi Illa (Duet)" | Anuradha Bhat, Santhosh | 3:36 |
| Total length: | | | 21:14 |

== Reception ==
=== Critical response ===
BS Srivani from Deccan Herald wrote, "Coming from a seasoned and intelligent director, the stretched out climax is a disappointment. This Galaate loses volume pretty quickly. Watch it for Suman and the rest". A critic from The Times of India scored the film at 3 out of 5 stars and wrote, "While Prajwal impresses you with his matured performance, Krithi gives life to her role. Shobhraj and Suman make a good screen couple with decent performances. Tilak shines as a villain. Cinematography by AV Krishnakumar is amazing and music by Jassie Gift is good". Srikant Srinivasa from Rediff.com scored the film at 2 out of 5 stars and said, "The music is average and Krishna Kumar's camerawork is good. The film raises a few laughs but lacks zing; it may work as pastime for the college-going crowd". A critic from News18 India wrote, "In short, 'Galaate' can be described as an ordinary fare because of its weak story and illogical narration".
