= Bhadra (2011 film) =

- Directed by: Mahesh Rao
- Screenplay by: Mahesh Rao
- Story by: Amma Rajasekhar
- Produced by: N. Kumar
- Starring: Prajwal Devaraj; Daisy Shah
- Cinematography: Jai Anand
- Edited by: Shrikanth Gowda
- Music by: Sri Guru
- Production company: M. N. K. Films
- Distributed by: M. N. K. Films
- Release date: 12 August 2011
- Running time: 148 minutes
- Country: India
- Language: Kannada

Bhadra is a 2011 Kannada action comedy film about a village boy who goes to college and falls in love with his classmate, who turns out be the sister of an underworld don. The film is a remake of the Telugu film Ranam.

== Cast ==
- Prajwal Devaraj as Bhadra
- Daisy Shah as Kavya
- Sharan
- Sampath Raj as Underworld Don Naga
- Bullet Prakash
- M. N. Lakshmi Devi
- Sathyajith
- Mico Nagaraj
- Girish Shivanna
- Ramesh Bhat
- Yathiraj
- Akki Channabasappa
- Patre Nagaraj
- Chandrakala Mohan
- Mamatha Ravuth
- Rithesh
- Vijay Jatti
- Raghav Nag

== Soundtrack ==
Sri Guru composed the film's music. All the songs were copied from the original, without giving the credits to the original composer Mani Sharma.

No.	Title	Singer(s)	Length
1.	"Hey Chinna Baa Chinna"	Tippu, Megha
2.	"Jaddugaara Jokumara"	Anuradha Bhat
3.	"Bangari Entha Anda"	Udit Narayan
4.	"Nambyada Nambyada"	V. Harikrishna
5.	"Mandanari Baale"	Tippu, Malathi
6.	"Nambyada Nambyada"	Shreeguru

== Reception ==
=== Critical response ===
A critic from News18 India wrote ""Bhadra" engages you throughout its length. It may be a high value entertainer for audiences who have not watched the original and can be an above average outing for the fans who have watched the remake. You may even watch it with your family members to have a few laughs". A critic from Sify.com wrote "Fights have been the major attraction in this film with Ravi Varma and Thriller Manju choreographing thrilling fights. The songs like 'Aa Chinna' and 'Madanaari Baale' are quite catchy. Jai Anand's camera work is another factor that is quite impressive. Sri Guru's work can only be commended for background music as all the song compositions are lifted from the original Telugu film".
