= Savaal (2014 film) =

2014 Kannada film

- Directed by: Dhananjay Balaji
- Produced by: K Thimmaraju
- Starring: Prajwal Devaraj; K Mutthuraj; Abhay; Sona Chopra
- Cinematography: PKH Das
- Edited by: Vinod Manohar
- Music by: V. Manohar
- Release date: 14 March 2014
- Country: India
- Language: Kannada

Savaal is a 2014 Indian Kannada-language film directed by Dhananjay Balaji, starring Prajwal Devaraj, K Mutthuraj, Abhay, Sona Chopra and Shobhraj.

== Cast ==
- Prajwal Devaraj as Arjun
- K Mutthuraj
- Abhay
- Sona Chopra
- Shobaraj as Aadi's brother
- Raj Purohith
- Rithesh
- Jai Jagadish

== Music ==
Savaal

Soundtrack album by V Manohar
- Released: 2014
- Recorded: 2014
- Genre: Feature film soundtrack
- Length: 19:23
- Language: Kannada

Official audio
- Savaal - Full Album on YouTube

The music was composed by V. Manohar.

Track listing
No.	Title	Singer(s)	Length
1.	"Muchkondiru"	Sunitha, Arun Iyer	5:09
2.	"Premada Mathina"	Rithisha Padmanabha	4:01
3.	"Jen Kithmele"	Chinthan Vikas	3:57
4.	"Eddeddedu Sidiva"	Chinthan Vikas	2:57
5.	"Premada Mathina"	Rajesh Krishnan	3:59
Total length:			19:23

== Reception ==
A Shardhha of The New Indian Express wrote, "And, the support cast fails too, including Sadhu Kokila and Bullet Prakash. Nothing worthy of mentioning about V Manohar’s music nor PKH Doss’ work as a camera person. Savaal is a total let down with a paper-thin plot. Skip it". Shyam Prasad S of Bangalore Mirror scored the film at 1.5 out of 5 stars and says "he gives up his life by coming between an assassin's bullet and Prajwal. Shobraj has probably not been paid his remuneration and he has not dubbed for the role. But the dubbing artiste has done a good job. Thank God, the film is fewer than two hours". Sify scored the film at 3 out of 5 stars and wrote "Dhananjay Balaji has to possibly do a better coursework before he could even think of next project. V.Manohar?s music does not create any magic and goes with the flow of story while PKH Das as the cameraman is convincing in his shots". BS Srivani of Deccan Herald wrote "P K H Das is as good as ever. With incomplete visualisation, even action sequences suffer. Ditto the actors. An actor like Raju Thalikote is made to ham endlessly. Raj Purohith, who showed promise in Kaarthick, has very little screentime here. Shona Chhabra jiggles some but little else. Shobharaj and Jai Jagadish are wasted, with the former’s drugs-fuelled rages evoking only pity".
