= Amma I Love You =

2018 Indian Kannada-language action film

- Directed by: K. M. Chaitanya
- Written by: Rajashekhar K.L. [Dialogues]
- Story by: Sasi
- Based on: Pichaikkaran by Sasi
- Produced by: Dwarkish; Yogish Dwarkish
- Starring: Chiranjeevi Sarja; Sithara; Nishvika Naidu
- Cinematography: Shekhar Chandra
- Edited by: N. M. Vishwa
- Music by: Gurukiran
- Production company: Dwarkish Chitra
- Distributed by: Mysore Talkies (Jack Manju)
- Release date: June 15, 2018
- Running time: 2 hours 27 minutes
- Country: India
- Language: Kannada

Amma I Love You (transl. Mother I love you) is a 2018 Indian Kannada-language action film directed by K. M. Chaitanya and produced by Dwarkish and Yogi Dwarkish. It features Chiranjeevi Sarja and debutant Nishvika Naidu along with Sithara in the lead roles. The soundtrack is composed by Gurukiran. The film had a good box-office collection and completed a 50-day run in theaters and multiplexes and became one of the hit films of 2018. This film is a remake of Tamil film Pichaikkaran (2016).

== Plot ==
Siddharth Shivakumar aka Siddhu is a rich businessman based out of Mysore. His mother, Annapoorna, is the person behind the growth of their textile business, Annapoorna Textiles, following her husband's early death. Puttappa is her brother-in-law who is money minded and has plans to grab Siddhu's properties. Siddhu returns from abroad after graduation and takes charge of all the businesses previously run by his mother. In the meantime, Annapoorna meets with an accident in the factory and falls into a coma. All the efforts taken by Siddhu for her treatment are in vain. By chance, he meets a sage on a mountain who tells him that there is a way to save his mother; the sage asks him that his mother might have a chance to survive if Siddhu leads the life of a beggar for 48 days as penance. He needs to meet two conditions; he shouldn't reveal his true identity, and shouldn't inform anyone else of this.

With no other way to save his mother, Siddhu accepts both conditions and informs his friend Rajesh to look after the business until he returns. Siddhu travels to Bangalore and joins other beggars at a temple, and starts begging. He comes across Bindu and falls in love with her seeing her charitable personality. Siddhu recalls that he and his mother had initially decided to approach Bindu for her hand in marriage through a matrimonial site. Bindu also encounters Siddhu later and starts to like his character, not knowing that he is a beggar. Puttappa realises the absence of Siddhu and tries to take over Siddhu's business. In a wedding ceremony, Bindu learns that Siddhu is a beggar and is angered, thinking Siddhu has misled her. She still doesn't avoid him as she is impressed by his good nature. One day Bindu's mother sees Siddhu's photo on her laptop and reveals that he is a rich businessman and that she had shared her photos with him through the matrimony website a few months ago. Bindu is shocked and tries to meet Siddhu, where she overhears the conversation between Siddhu and Rajesh, which makes her realise Siddhu's life as a beggar is to save his mother, and she is impressed by his good nature. Rajesh urges Siddhu to return, but Siddhu refuses to come with him. Bindu decides not to disturb Siddhu until his life as a beggar is still incomplete.

Meanwhile, a group of doctors who manage a mental health centre use the patients for their illegal medical experiments, which are discovered by Siddhu with the help of a beggar who stays there by pretending to be a mentally challenged girl. After finding out about this, the doctors hire a contract killer named Arun Kale to murder Siddhu. Meanwhile, Puttappa spots Siddhu leading a beggar's life and learns that he is trying to save Annapoorna's life by doing so. Realizing that he would miss the opportunity to inherit Annapoorna's wealth, Puttappa also hires Arun Kale to finish Siddhu. Siddhu and Bindu meet each other where they are cornered by Arun Kale and his goons, who try to kill him but accidentally stab Bindu, who is then admitted to the hospital. Siddhu, who is yet to complete his term as a beggar, is left hopeless as he is unable to pay the hospital expenses for Bindu, but his beggar friends give him some money to help out. The mental health centre is closed and the doctors, Arun Kale and Puttappa are arrested by police.

Siddhu gets back to his home after 48 days along with Rajesh to visit Annapoorna and learns that there is no improvement in her health. Siddhu holds Annapoorna's hands and prays for her recovery. Suddenly he feels Annapoorna's hands moving. After six months, Annapoorna completely recovers where Siddhu and Bindu get married. A beggar begs for money from Siddhu in front of a temple, but Siddhu, being busy with a phone call, fails to notice the beggar. Annapoorna gives alms to the beggar and tells Siddhu that the life of a beggar is so pathetic and they should never hurt them as people like themselves cannot lead a beggar's life even a single day, implying that Annapoorna is unaware of Siddhu's sacrifice.

== Cast ==
- Chiranjeevi Sarja as Siddharth Shivakumar
- Nishvika Naidu as Bindu
- Sithara as Annapoorna
- Prakash Belwadi as Puttappa
- Chikkanna as Siddharth's friend
- Ravi Kale as Arun Kale
- Avinash as Swamiji
- Vaijanath Biradar
- Sudha Belawadi as Bindu's mother
- Taranga Vishwa
- Renuka Prasad
- Chinnayya
- Sardhar Sathya
- Kari Subbu
- Giri Dwarakish as Rajesh
- Yogish Dwarakish
- Sushma Gowda
- Mahesh Raj
- Bangalore Nagesh
- Nitesh Nittur
- Shivakumar Aaradhya

== Soundtrack ==
Amma I Love You

Soundtrack album by Gurukiran
- Genre: Feature film soundtrack
- Language: Kannada
- Label: Anand Audio
- Producer: Dwarkish

The film's background score and the soundtracks are composed by Gurukiran. The music rights were acquired by Anand Audio.

Tracklist
No.	Title	Lyrics	Singer(s)	Length
1.	"Amma"	V. Nagendra Prasad	Sunil Khashyap
2.	"Nee Yaro Nanage"	V. Nagendra Prasad	Santhosh Venky, Mahalakshmi Iyer
3.	"Ee Mounave"	Kaviraj	Jyotsna Radhakrishnan
4.	"Yettutharo"	Ghouse Peer	Chintan Vikas, Siddharth Belmmanu
5.	"One & Only Iva Ekangi"	V. Nagendra Prasad	Sadhu Kokila

== Reception ==
Sunayana Suresh from The Times of India wrote "This film, which is based on a real-life story, has the quintessential ingredients that make for the commercial potboilers. There is action, romance, family drama and comedy. The emotional graph of the film, at times, wavers, which proves to be a slight setback, but the climax and the scenes leading up to that ensure that they make up for it" The New Indian Express wrote "Amma I Love You is a fine film to watch if one goes without the hangover of the original. You never know, you might just end up calling your mother." Rakesh Mehar from The News Minute wrote "But what the film never manages to do is make us genuinely interested in this begging world that our hero suddenly comes to inhabit. Once we’re done with our poor-cation in Siddharth’s company, we can all comfortably return to our own worlds without too much thought about the lives of those less fortunate" A Sharadhha from Cinema Express wrote "Amma I Love You is a fine film to watch if one goes without the hangover of the original. You never know, you might just end up calling your mother."

== Home media ==
The film is digitally available on YouTube in Kannada. It is also available in Hindi & Marathi language dubbed version currently streaming on Ultra Play & Ultra Jhakaas app respectively.
