= Dinesh Mangaluru =

Indian actor and art director (1970/1971–2025)

- Occupation: Actor
- Years active: 1988–2025

Dinesh Mangaluru (1969 or 1970 – 25 August 2025) was an Indian actor.

== Life and career ==
Mangaluru began acting in the theatre. Throughout his career, he worked on hundreds of films as an Art director. He primarily worked in Kannada cinema. He was known for playing The Bombay Don in the KGF film series.

Mangaluru died in Kundapura, Karnataka on 25 August 2025, at the age of 55.

== Selected filmography ==
- Aasphota (1988)
- Nagamandala (1996)
- Z (1999)
- Atithi (2002)
- Smile (2003)
- Durgi (2004)
- Rakshasa (2005)
- Shubham (2006)
- Aa Dinagalu (2007) as Seetharam Shetty
- Inthi Ninna Preethiya (2008)
- Ambari (2009) as Saro's father
- Savari (2009)
- Prarthane (2012)
- Ulidavaru Kandanthe (2014) as Shankar Poojary
- Rana Vikrama (2015) as Kulakarni
- Ricky (2016) as Radhakrishna's Uncle
- Kirik Party (2016) as Karna's Father
- KGF: Chapter 1 (2018) as Shetty
- Alidu Ulidavaru (2019)
- Bell Bottom (2019) as Chamanlal Seth
- Shivarjuna (2020) as MLA
- Arjun Gowda (2021)
- Harikathe Alla Girikathe (2022) as Jokumaraswamy
- 777 Charlie (2022) as SI Ranjan Shetty
- KGF: Chapter 2 (2022) as Shetty
- Ramabanam (2023) as Guptha
- Bhuvanam Gaganam (2025)
- Shesha 2016 (2026)
