= Angaaraka =

- Directed by: Srinivas Kaushik
- Screenplay by: Srinivas Kaushik
- Story by: Srinivas Kaushik
- Produced by: Jayasudha Raghavendra
- Starring: Prajwal Devaraj; Pranitha Subhash; Avinash; Hardhika Shetty
- Cinematography: B. L. Babu
- Edited by: Sanjeev Reddy
- Music by: Arjun Janya
- Production company: SSS Studios
- Release date: 10 January 2014
- Country: India
- Language: Kannada

Angaaraka is a 2014 Indian Kannada-language action drama film directed by Srinivas Kaushik and produced by Jayasudha Raghavendra. The film stars Prajwal Devaraj, Pranitha Subhash and Hardhika Shetty in the lead roles. The film released on 10 January 2014 to the mixed and negative reviews.

== Plot ==
A village politician's (Avinash) son Vijay (Prajwal) comes back to his village after his graduation. He intends to settle down in his village and meets Priya (Pranitha), a girl from an ordinary villager. But his father wants him to marry Kavya (Hardhika), who is from an affluent family, which in turn would benefit his political ambitions. Vijay makes his stand firm and proceeds to marry off Priya. Meanwhile, his father hatches a plot by playing an astrological gimmick and makes Vijay believe that the things would go awry after the marriage. How the couple reunite and goes against the wishes of elders forms the rest of the plot.

== Cast ==
- Prajwal Devaraj as Viji a.k.a. Vijay
- Pranitha Subhash as Priya
- Hardhika Shetty as Kavya
- Avinash as Viji's father
- Jai Jagadish as Rajashekar
- Muni
- Dharma
- Chidanand
- Shivaram
- Veena Sundar
- Veena Venkatesh
- Kishore
- Vikram

== Reception ==
The film opened to mostly average and negative reviews from the critics. The Times of India rated 3/5 stars while stating that "the movie is a waste of effort as it is done without any imagination" while panning the director's job. The Indian cine gallery gave a verdict as a "very ordinary presentation" again criticizing the work of the director.

== Soundtrack ==
The music is composed by Arjun Janya for Ashwini Media company and lyrics are written by Ghouse Peer, Gee Gee and Shyam Shimoga. The audio release of the film was held on 1 November 2013 coinciding the Kannada Rajyotsava day. A total of 5 tracks have been composed by Arjun Janya.

Track listing
No.	Title	Lyrics	Singer(s)	Length
1.	"Jigidu Jigidu"	Gee Gee	Anuradha Bhat	4:28
2.	"Priyamani"	Gee Gee	Arjun Janya	3:59
3.	"Something Special"	Ghouse Peer	Santhosh Venky, Raksha	4:05
4.	"Kannu Kannalle"	Shyam Shimoga	Deepak, Anuradha Bhat	4:10
5.	"Ala Alare"	Shyam Shimoga	Hemanth Kumar, Suma Shastry	4:15
