= Karataka Damanaka =

- Theatrical release poster
- Directed by: Yogaraj Bhat
- Written by: Vikas; Yogaraj Bhat; Subramanya M K
- Produced by: Rockline Venkatesh
- Starring: Shiva Rajkumar; Prabhu Deva; Priya Anand; Nishvika Naidu
- Cinematography: Santosh Rai Pathaje
- Edited by: K. M. Prakash
- Music by: V. Harikrishna
- Production company: Rockline Entertainments
- Release date: 8 March 2024
- Country: India
- Language: Kannada
- Box office: ₹2.86 crores

Karataka Damanaka is a 2024 Indian Kannada-language action drama film directed by Yogaraj Bhat, and produced by Rockline Venkatesh. The film stars Shiva Rajkumar, Prabhu Deva, Priya Anand and Nishvika Naidu in the lead roles. The title of the film is derived from the characters found in the "Mitra Bedha" book of Panchatantra.

Released on 8 March 2024, the film marks the return of Prabhu Deva to Kannada cinema after 17 years.

== Plot ==
Two fraudsters are on a mission to convince and bring a man back to the city, but they take a different route which complicates their lives in the village of Nandikolur.

== Cast ==
- Shiva Rajkumar as Virupaksha alias "Karataka"
- Prabhu Deva as Bala Raju alias "Damanaka"
- Priya Anand as Kusumi
- Nishvika Naidu as Kempi
- P. Ravi Shankar as Jagga
- Rangayana Raghu as MLA Mugellappa
- Rockline Venkatesh as Jailer
- Tanikella Bharani as Ramanna
- Doddanna as Anandappa
- Vaijanath Biradar as Villager
- Yogaraj Bhat as Ajjaiah
- Nayana
- Govindegowda
- Harshith Gowdru

== Production ==
In September 2018, it was being reported that Shiva Rajkumar was to collaborate with Director Yogaraj Bhat for an untitled film. It was reported that the film was later titled as Kuladalli Keelyavudo. However, there was no official announcements about the same. In 2020, it was reported that Prabhu Deva is being part of the film, which was confirmed by the Bhat himself. Later Priya Anand and Nishvika Naidu were roped into play the lead roles in the film. The film was later titled as Karataka Damanaka.

=== Filming ===
The film was majorly shot on outskirts of Bangalore, Kolar, Gauribidanur, and North Karnataka.

=== Themes and influences ===
The title of the film was inspired from characters of Panchatantra.

== Soundtrack ==
Karataka Damanaka

Soundtrack album by V. Harikrishna
- Released: 29 January 2024
- Recorded: 2023
- Genre: Feature film soundtrack
- Length: 7:21
- Label: Anand Audio
- Producer: V. Harikrishna

V. Harikrishna chronology
Kaatera (2023)	Karataka Damanaka (2024)

Official audio
- Karataka Damanaka Audio Jukebox on YouTube

V. Harikrishna composed music and background score for the film. The first single "Karataka Damanaka Title track" was released on 29 January 2024. The second single "Deega Digari" was released on 10 February.

No.	Title	Lyrics	Singer(s)	Length
1.	"Karataka Damanaka Title Track"	Ghouse Peer	Shankar Mahadevan	4:22
2.	"Deega Digiri"	Yogaraj Bhat	Upendra, Rajesh Krishnan	3:54
3.	"Meetadene Veene"	Yogaraj Bhat	Rajesh Krishnan	3:13
4.	"Hithalaka Karibyada Maava"	Yogaraj Bhat	Malu Nipanal, Shruthi Prahalad	3:26
5.	"Manuja Nindyava Ooru"	Yogaraj Bhat	Vijay Prakash	2:54
6.	"Baalu Badenekayi"	Yogaraj Bhat	V. Harikrishna	3:42
7.	"Karataka Damanaka Theme Music"		V. Harikrishna	0:46
8.	"Karataka Damanaka Theme Music 2"		V. Harikrishna	1:49
Total length:				24:09

== Release ==
The film was released on 8 March 2024.

== Reception ==
Vinay Lokesh of The Times of India rated this film 3 stars out of 5 stars and noted "Overall, "Karataka Dhamanaka" offers an enjoyable cinematic experience, despite minor flaws, making it a worthwhile watch." Sujay B M of Deccan Herald wrote "'Karataka Damanaka' is a mixed bag. It takes up a time-tested template and works with a blockbuster pair, but the plot slackens and goes out of focus."

Vivek M.V of The Hindu said "That said, it’s encouraging to see Bhat striving to be different, even after two decades in the industry, and Karataka Damanaka is a nice little comeback from the director after the forgettable Garadi in 2023." Anjali Belgaumkar of The Indian Express rated the film 1.5 stars out of 5 stars and noted "From start to the end, the unnatural and exaggerated performances in this film can overwhelm viewers, making it difficult to understand the actual storyline. Bhat's direction lacks cohesion, failing to simply blend past and present elements."
