= Shiva Ganesh =

Indian director and screenwriter

- Born: Ganesh Kumar Shanthakumar
- Occupations: Film director, screenwriter
- Years active: 2009-Present

Ganesh Kumar Shanthakumar, known by his screen name Shiva Ganesh, is an Indian director and screenwriter who predominantly works in the Kannada film industry.

== Career ==
Ganesh Kumar Shanthakumar made his debut with Akhaada in 2010, which he introduced Vijay Sethupathi. Then he did a romantic film Hridayadalli Idhenidhu in the year 2010.

== Filmography ==
Year	Film	Language	Writer	Director	Notes
2010	Akhaada	Kannada	Yes	Yes	direct YouTube release of dubbed versions in 2019
2010	Hridayadalli Idhenidhu	Kannada	Yes	Yes	
2016	Jigarthanda	Kannada	No	Yes	
2018	Trataka	Kannada	Yes	Yes	
2019	Aa Drushya	Kannada	No	Yes	
2019	Police Stories 2.0	Tamil	No	Yes	Web Series for ZEE5
2020	Dear Sathya	Kannada	No	Yes	
2020	Singapenne	Tamil	No	Yes	Web Series for ZEE5 Club
	Thanneer Desam	Tamil	No	Yes	
