= Yellow Gangs =

- Directed by: Ravindra Parameshwarappa
- Written by: Ravindra Parameshwarappa
- Produced by: Vibhinna Studios in association with Key Lights and What Next Movies
- Starring: Archana Kottige, Dev Devaiah, Bala Rajwadi, Sathya Ummathal, Arunn Jaanu, Sathya B G, Natyaranga, Vittal Parita, Pradeep Poojari, Sanchari Madhu.
- Cinematography: Sugnan
- Edited by: Suresh Arumugam
- Music by: Rohit Sower
- Production companies: Vibhinna Studios; Key Lights; What Next Movies
- Release date: 11 November 2022
- Running time: 136 minutes
- Country: India
- Language: Kannada

Yellow Gangs is a 2022 Indian Kannada language crime thriller film written and directed by Ravindra Parameshwarappa in his directorial debut, and produced by Vibhinna Studios in association with Key Lights and What Next Movies. The ensemble cast features Archana Kottige, Dev Devaiah, Bala Rajwadi, Sathya Ummathal, Arunn Jaanu, Sathya B G, Natyaranga, Vittal Parita, Sanchari Madhu and Pradeep Poojari.

The film follows the intertwining lives of multiple gangs, a corrupt cop, and a street-smart journalist after a drug deal goes wrong, leading to a violent chain of betrayals. It was released theatrically on 11 November 2022 and later became available on Amazon Prime Video.

== Plot ==
A drug deal between gangster Ushna’s crew and two hippies goes awry when their vehicle crashes in front of a narcotics officer, triggering a police bust and setting off dire consequences. Ushna hides the cash at his accountant’s home. Meanwhile, Tentnaga and his nomadic gang, planning a jewelry heist, are recruited by the accountant for a bigger heist targeting Ushna’s hidden stash.

Elsewhere, mobster Krishnappa, directed by his astrologer to acquire a vintage car, sends his henchmen to steal it from an eccentric old man, “Uncle,” via petty thieves Prabhu and Seena. Vikram, a corrupt sub-inspector under Krishnappa’s sway, is forced to find the hidden money to protect his journalist girlfriend, Priya. On the day of the heists, Tentnaga betrays the accountant, packing him into the stolen car’s trunk. Prabhu and Seena flee with both car and accountant; Tentnaga’s gang escapes with the money.

Chaos ensues: Ushna's gang hunts Tentnaga, Uncle turns to the police, and Vikram joins the chase. All paths converge at an abandoned junkyard for a bloody Mexican standoff that seals the characters’ fates—turned by greed, chance, and gunfire.

== Cast ==
- Archana Kottige as Priya
- Dev Devaiah as Vikram
- Bala Rajwadi as Krishnappa
- Arunn Jaanu as Ushna
- Sathya B G as Tentnaga
- Natyaranga as Prabhu
- Vittal Parita as Seena
- Sathya Ummathal as Uncle
- Pradeep Poojari as Spark

== Production ==
The film was shot entirely in and around suburban Bengaluru to create a non-specific, raw backdrop. Techniques like handheld cinematography and no-makeup acting were employed for immersive realism. Director Ravindra Parameshwarappa, a Manipal University graduate and former assistant to Yogaraj Bhat, crafted a non-linear, interwoven crime narrative exploring themes of greed, pride, and betrayal. The core crew included director of photography Sugnan, editor Suresh Arumugam, and composer Rohit Sower.

== Release ==
=== Theatrical ===
Yellow Gangs premiered in Indian theaters on 11 November 2022.

=== Home media ===
The film was later made available on Amazon Prime Video on 20 June 2023.

== Reception ==
Yellow Gangs received generally positive to mixed reviews. OTTPlay rated it 3.5 out of 5, praising its conviction and finesse. Likewise, the Kannada daily Vijaya Karnataka awarded it 3.5 out of 5 for maintaining curiosity throughout. International outlets like Film Threat and Asian Movie Pulse highlighted its ensemble structure, stylistic grit, and dark humour.
