= Dilpasand =

2022 Kannada language film directed by Shivatejass

- Directed by: Shivatejass
- Produced by: Sumant Kranthi
- Starring: Krishna; Nishvika Naidu; Megha Shetty
- Cinematography: Shekhar Chandra
- Edited by: K. M. Prakash
- Music by: Arjun Janya
- Production company: Rashmi Films
- Release date: 11 November 2022
- Country: India
- Language: Kannada

Dilpasand is a 2022 Indian Kannada language romantic film directed by Shivatejass. It stars Krishna, Nishvika Naidu and Megha Shetty in the lead roles. The music is composed by Arjun Janya.

== Plot ==
Santhosh is a happy-go-lucky software employee, who is all set to marry his fiancée Minchu, who comes from upper caste Brahmin family. Minchu decide to impress Santhosh by living like a modern woman. One night, Santhosh meets Aishwarya, a carefree woman, who is drunk and takes her to a lodge, where he also fell asleep. Later, Aishwarya doubts whether she and Santhosh had sex, and blackmails him to stay for 45 days till the pregnancy reports arrive. Later, Santhosh manages to handle Minchu, who is unaware about Aishwarya.

Santhosh and Aishwarya become friends and soon they fall for each other. However, Minchu's friend Sandhya sees Santhosh and Aishwarya at the hospital, and misunderstands them to be in relationship. She reveals it to the family, where Minchu cancels the alliance and her family insults Santhosh's parents. Santhosh's parents also berates Santhosh and leaves. The next morning, Santhosh finds that Aishwarya has left, and is given a letter, which states that Aishwarya actually loved Santhosh from the beginning, and wanted to spend time with him by lying about her pregnancy.

Three months later, Santhosh reunites with his parents, and finds Aishwarya, who is about to be engaged with her fiancé Preetham. One night, Preetham convinces Aishwarya to reunite with Santhosh, as he learnt about their relationship. Later, Santhosh meets Aishwarya and the two live happily ever after.

== Cast ==
- Krishna as Santhosh
- Nishvika Naidu as Aishwarya
- Megha Shetty as Minchu
- Rangayana Raghu as Rangappa, Santhosh's father
- Sadhu Kokila as Santhosh's boss
- Tabla Nani as Minchu's father
- Ajay Rao as Preetham (cameo appearance)
