= Dear Sathya =

- Directed by: Shiva Ganesh
- Written by: Kanishk Varma
- Screenplay by: Prawaal Raman
- Produced by: Aryan Santosh
- Starring: Aryan Santosh; Archana Kottige; Ashwin Rao Pallakki; Aruna Balraj; Aravind Rao
- Cinematography: Vinod Bharathi
- Edited by: Suresh Arumugam
- Music by: Sridhar V Sambhram
- Distributed by: Purple Rock Entertainers, Winterbridge Studios
- Release date: 10 March 2022 (India)
- Running time: 101 minutes
- Country: India
- Language: Kannada

Dear Sathya is a 2022 Indian Kannada-language film directed by Shiva Ganesh and produced by Santhosh Kumar.

== Plot ==
While tracing the protagonist's path through the hustle and bustle of a busy life and his attempts to realise his goals Sathya tells the untold story of qa common man and the people in his immediate surroundings.

== Cast ==
- Aryan Santosh as Sathya
- Archana Kottige as Anjali
- Ashwin Rao Pallaki
- Aruna Balraj
- Aravind Rao

== Release ==
The film was released on 10 March 2022.

== Reception ==
Cinema Express rated the film 3 stars out of 5 and wrote "However, the director, who has tackled a realistic subject, does get carried away with the commercial elements. With neat performances, the film could have made for a crisp thriller if the repetitive scenes were cut short."

Harish Basavarajaiah for The Times of India wrote "While the filmmaker has tried to create a unique story, there are some questions that remain unanswered even at the end of the film. This is where the film lags a little."

A Sharadhaa from The New Indian Express rated the film 3 stars of 5 stars and wrote "Director Shiva Ganesh, who proved his directorial capabilities with the remake of Jigarthanda in Kannada, has done a good job with Dear Sathya. However, the director, who has tackled a realistic subject, does get carried away with the commercial elements."

OTTPlay reviews and wrote " Dear Sathya is based on a story that Santhosh wrote inspired by a real-life incident."
