= Trataka (film) =

- Directed by: Shiva Ganesh
- Screenplay by: Shiva Ganesh
- Story by: Naru Naarayanan; Maha Keerthi; Shiva Ganesh
- Produced by: Rahul Ainapur
- Starring: Rahul Ainapur; Ajith Jayraj; Hridaya Avanti; Yash Shetty; Bhavani Prakash; Akshatha; Nandhagopal M K Ajay Shivraj; Pradeep Poojary
- Cinematography: A. Vinod Bharathi
- Edited by: Suresh Arumugam
- Music by: Arun suradha
- Production company: Aastha Cinemas
- Distributed by: N.R. SUDHIR; N M Entertainment
- Release date: 31 August 2018
- Running time: 127 minutes
- Country: India
- Language: Kannada

Trataka is a 2018 Indian Kannada film written and directed by Shivaganesh. Trataka is a story about an ACP who suffers from Complex Partial Seizure. His brother is murdered. He has two close friends and a love interest who are helping him in finding the killer. The film has loads of blood and goriness attached to it. Trataka was released on 31 August 2018. The film released to negative reviews.

== Cast ==
- Rahul Ainapur as Jaidev aka Deva
- Ajith Jayraj as Ravi
- Yash Shetty as Sharath
- Hridaya Avanthi as Dr Pavithra Radhakrishna
