= Endendu Ninagagi =

- Theatrical release poster
- Directed by: Mahesh Rao
- Screenplay by: Mahesh Rao
- Story by: M. Saravanan
- Based on: Engaeyum Eppothum
- Produced by: A. Narasimhan
- Starring: Vivek Narasimhan; Deepa Sannidhi; Anish Tejeshwar; Sindhu Lokanath
- Cinematography: Jai Anand
- Edited by: Deepu. S. Kumar
- Music by: V. Harikrishna
- Production company: Sunrise Productions
- Distributed by: Jayanna Films
- Release date: 11 April 2014
- Running time: 127 minutes
- Country: India
- Language: Kannada

Endendu Ninagagi is a 2014 Indian Kannada-language drama film directed by Mahesh Rao. A remake of the Tamil film Engaeyum Eppothum, it features newcomer Vivek Narasimhan, Deepa Sannidhi, Anish Tejeshwar and Sindhu Lokanath in the lead roles.

== Cast ==
- Vivek Narasimhan as Suri
- Deepa Sannidhi as Soumya
- Anish Tejeshwar as Gowtham
- Sindhu Lokanath as Mathura
- Abhaya Simha
- Rashmi Simha
- Karthik Sharma as Karthik

== Production ==
In 2013, Balaji bought the remake rights to Engaeyum Eppothum (2011) and launched his brother-in-law Narasimhan's son Vivek.

== Soundtrack ==
No.	Title	Lyrics	Singer(s)	Length
1.	"Khayile"	Yogaraj Bhat	Tippu	3:44
2.	"Nee Jothe"	A. P. Arjun	Sonu Nigam	4:02
3.	"Kuri Mari"	A. P. Arjun	V Harikrishna	4:09
4.	"Yenu Mathadade"	Yogaraj Bhat	Vani Harikrishna	3:38
Total length:				19:17

== Critical reception ==
The Times of India gave it 3 stars out of 5 and called it "a compact film worth watching at least once". The New Indian Express wrote that director Mahesh Rao "tells us a tragic tale of love and fate with great sensitivity and that he has managed to retain much of the melodrama of the original flick in his remake". Sify wrote, "The story and screenplay is definitely impressive and the director has to be credited for sketching the movie in the right way" and called the film "definitely worth a weekend".
