= Love OTP =

2025 Indian film by Aniissh Tejeshwar

- Kannada theatrical release poster
- Directed by: Aniissh Tejeshwar
- Written by: Aniissh Tejeshwar
- Produced by: Vijay M Reddy
- Starring: Aniissh Tejeshwar; Rajeev Kanakala; Swaroopinii; Jahnvika Kalakeri
- Cinematography: Harsha Vardhan K
- Edited by: Sharath Kumar
- Music by: Anand Rajavikram
- Production company: Bhavaprita Productions
- Release date: 14 November 2025
- Country: India
- Languages: Kannada; Telugu

Love OTP is a 2025 Indian romantic drama film written and directed by Aniissh Tejeshwar, who also plays the lead role alongside Rajeev Kanakala, Swaroopinii and Jahnvika Kalakeri. Produced by Vijay M Reddy under Bhavaprita Productions, the film explores modern relationships and emotional boundaries.

Shot simultaneously in Kannada and Telugu languages, the film was released on 14 November 2025. Despite positive reviews, the film faced low theater attendance.

== Plot ==
Akshay "Akki" (Aniissh Tejeshwar) is an aspiring cricketer whose life is caught between personal dreams and family expectations, especially under the stern discipline of his father, Shankar (Rajeev Kanakala). His romantic journey begins with Sana (Swaroopinii), whose deep attachment and growing insecurity turn their relationship increasingly suffocating. Akshay feels trapped, torn between loyalty and the need for emotional space. Amid this turmoil, he meets Nakshathra (Jahnvika Kalakeri), a calm physiotherapist for his cricket team, whose presence brings clarity and warmth. As Akshay navigates Sana's obsessive behaviour, his budding feelings for Nakshathra, and the pressure to succeed in cricket, he confronts questions of love, boundaries, and responsibility. The film explores modern relationships, highlighting how affection can tip into control and how self-awareness leads to healthier choices.

== Cast ==
- Aniissh Tejeshwar as Akshay "Akki"
- Rajeev Kanakala as R. Shankar, Akshay's father
- Swaroopinii as Sana
- Jahnvika Kalakeri as Nakshathra
- Pramodini as Akshay's mother
- Natya Ranga as Varun
- Chetan Gandharva as Harsha, Sana's brother
- Ravi Bhat
- Tulasi
- Annapoorna

== Music ==
The background score and songs were composed by Anand Rajavikram.

All lyrics are written by Nagarjun Sharma.

Kannada track listing
No.	Title	Singer(s)	Length
1.	"Dhruvathare"	Shashaa Tirupati	3:47
2.	"Yo Yo"	Aniissh Tejeshwar, Rajeev Kanakala	3:05
3.	"Nanne Bedava"	Srilakshmi Belmannu	2:54

Telugu track listing
No.	Title	Lyrics	Singer(s)	Length
1.	"Vanamali"	Ramajogayya Sastry	Shashaa Tirupati	3:47
2.	"Yo Yo"	Dinesh Kakkerla	Aniissh Tejeshwar, Rajeev Kanakala	3:05
3.	"Nannae Kaadhanaa"	Battu Vijay Kumar	Srilakshmi Belmannu	2:54

== Release and reception ==
Love OTP was released on 14 November 2025.

A Sharadhaa of The New Indian Express gave a rating of 3.5 out of 5 and opined that, "Love OTP reflects the young love felt by anyone navigating desire, ambition, and responsibility". Suhas Sistu of The Hans India rated it 3 out of 5 and stated "Love OTP lands as a partially engaging youthful drama with enjoyable moments but falls short of becoming a standout romantic entertainer". Sanjay Ponnappa of India Today gave the same rating and opined that the story is "relatable" while writing that, "Love OTP is a film that tries to balance entertainment with a message about the darker side of love".
