= Shesha 2016 =

- Theatrical release poster
- Directed by: Pradeep Arsikere
- Written by: Pradeep Arasikere; Lithin Lohithakshan; Raghavendra Maiya
- Produced by: Umesh Thimmegowda
- Starring: John Kaippallil; Pramod Shetty; Archana Kottige; Devaraj
- Cinematography: R. S. Anandakumar
- Edited by: Ayoob Khan
- Music by: Poornachandra Tejaswi
- Production company: Maradigudda Entertainments
- Release date: 6 March 2026
- Country: India
- Languages: Kannada; Malayalam

Shesha 2016 is a 2026 Kannada language film, directed by Pradeep Arsikere, starring John Kaippallil, Pramod Shetty, Archana Kottige and veteran actor Devaraj in lead roles. The film, a bi-lingual was simultaneously shot in Malayalam language as well, has cast from both the film industry and was released on 6 March 2026.

== Synopsis ==
Shesha 2016 tells the gripping conflict between corruption and integrity happening within the police department, happening in one night. The film also shows, how a moral dilemma, quickly transforms into a violent struggle for survival.

== Cast ==
- Devaraj as Deputy superintendent of police
- Pramod Shetty as ASI Anthony Varghese
- John Kaippallil as SI Das R.
- Sreejith Ravi
- Dinesh Mangaluru
- Sidlingu Sridhar
- Nagendra Urs
- Shobaraj
- Yash Shetty
- Sidhaartha Maadhyamika
- Archana Kottige as ASI Geetha
- Dain Davis
- Sidhartha Siva
- Honnavalli Krishna
- Manjunath Gowda
- Sai Bhairav Gurudattha
- Madhu Sudan Vijaynagara

== Production ==
Director Pradeep Arasikere left his job at Karnataka electricity board, to launch himself as the film director. The film is a fictional story set along the Karnataka–Kerala border in the year 2016, said the director. The trailer was released on 17 February. The film, completed in a single schedule of 35 days, secured a significant deal as OTT rights with Amazon Prime Video before the theatrical release.

== Reception ==
=== Critical response ===
Susmita Sameera of The Times of India rated the film with 3/5 stars, appreciating the capable cast, cinematography and background score, concluding as the film remains an interesting watch largely because of its premise. Y Maheswara Reddy of Bangalore Mirror gave 3/5 stars, summing as the film is worth watch for the audience who enjoys suspense crime thrillers. A Sharadhaa of Cinema Express gave 2.5/5, stating that, the storytelling often feels cluttered, but holds suspense and offers a few tense moments, though narrative sometimes loses focus.
