= Jaanu =

Jaanu may refer to:

- Jaanu (2012 film), a 2012 Indian Kannada-language film
- Jaanu (2020 film), a 2020 Indian Telugu-language film

== See also ==
- Ok Jaanu, a 2017 Indian Hindi-language film
