= Meghana Gaonkar =

Indian Kannada actress

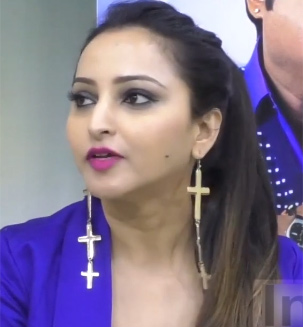
- Meghana Gaonkar in 2021
- Born: 8 May 1988 (age 38); Gulbarga, Karnataka, India
- Occupations: Actress, Dancer, Humanitarian
- Years active: 2010–present

Meghana Gaonkar (born 8 May 1987) is an Indian actress working in Kannada cinema. She made her acting debut in 2010, with the film Nam Areal Ond Dina. She has been nominated twice for Best Actress Filmfare Award.

== Early life ==
Meghana Gaonkar was born in Kalaburgi. She did her schooling from Sharanbasaveshwara Residential School in Kalaburgi and later completed her Bachelors in commerce degree from Sri Bhagawan Mahaveer Jain College, Bangalore. She obtained her master's degree in English literature from Bangalore University and a diploma in film acting and making from Adarsha Film & TV Institute, Bangalore. She was an assistant dance instructor at Shiamak Davar dance school. She has done many theatre plays with TopCast production and others. She completed her doctorate in Cinema & Literature at University of Mumbai in October 2024. She received her doctorate in 2025. Her most recent role was in the Kannada movie Choomantar, it was a hit film 2025. She is currently shooting for a historical period drama paired with Nenapirali Prem.

== Career ==
Gaonkar debuted in kannada movies in 2010. She began her career as a television host for many popular shows. She worked as an assistant dance instructor at Shiamak Davar Dance Company. She performed in many English, Kannada and French theatre plays. She has performed in Commonwealth games closing ceremony in Australia. She made her big screen appearance together with a debutant team of actors and director in Nam Areal Ond Dina (2010) with Rakshit Shetty and Anissh. Her role of Chinna won her rave reviews though the film failed to perform well commercially. Next, she paired with Vijay Raghavendra in Vinayaka Geleyara Balaga in 2011. In 2012, she appeared in the film Tuglak alongside Rakshith Shetty again. Her fourth film Charminar opposite Prem Kumar became a blockbuster hit in 2013. She became very popular known as Radhe from Charminar. She was nominated for best actress Filmfare awards for Charminar. Her next film Simpallag innondh love story was directed by simple suni, 2016. “Kalidasa Kannada Meshtru” with Jaggesh released in 2019. “Shubhamangala” released in 2021. She was again nominated for best actress for Shubhamangala. Shivaji Surathkal 2 released in 2023 with Ramesh Aravind, she played the role of an IPS officer. In 2024, ‘The Judgement’ opposite Ravichandran released. Choomantar with sharan released in 2025, it was the first superhit film of the year. She is nominated in many film awards for her top performance in Choomantar. She is currently shooting for three other films.

== Filmography ==
Key
†	Denotes films that have not yet been released

Year	Film	Role	Notes
2010	Nam Areal Ond Dina	Chinnu	
2011	Vinayaka Geleyara Balaga	Kavya	
2011	Tuglak	Sania	
2013	Charminar	Radhe	Nominated—Filmfare Award for Best Actress – Kannada
2016	Simpallag Innondh Love Story	Kushi	
2019	Kalidasa Kannada Meshtru	Suma	
2022	Shubhamangala	Anu	Nominated- Filmfare Award for Best Actress- Kannada
2023	Shivaji Surathkal 2	DCP Deepa Kamat	
2024	The Judgement	TBA	
2025	Choo Mantar	Catherine DiCosta	
