= Coffee With My Wife =

Coffee with My Wife
- Promotional poster
- Directed by: Vidyasagar
- Written by: Richard Louis
- Screenplay by: Madan
- Story by: Madan
- Produced by: Neelam Shankar; Madan (presenter)
- Starring: Anish Tejeshwar; Sindhu Lokanath
- Cinematography: Vishwa DB
- Music by: Manthra Anand
- Release date: November 22, 2013
- Country: India
- Language: Kannada

Coffee with My Wife is a 2013 Indian Kannada-language directed by Vidyasagar starring Anish Tejeshwar and Sindhu Lokanath in lead roles.

== Cast ==
- Anish Tejeshwar as Charan
- Sindhu Lokanath as Sindhu
- Kumuda Gowda

== Music ==
Coffee with My Wife (ಕಾಫಿ ವಿಥ್ ಮೈ ವೈಫ್)

Soundtrack album by Manthra Anand
- Released: 2013
- Recorded: 2013
- Genre: Feature film soundtrack
- Length: 23:56
- Language: Kannada

Official audio
- Coffee with My Wife - Full Album on YouTube

Track listing
No.	Title	Singer(s)	Length
1.	"Chakkani Vaadey"	L. V. Revanth, Deepthi Charya	4:18
2.	" Kannullo"	Deepthi Charya	4:12
3.	"Chilipi Yadhalo"	Venu Srirangam, E. Gayathri	4:17
4.	"Govinda Govinda"	Manojava Galgali, Mantra Anand	5:21
5.	"Coffee With My Wife (Theme Song)"	Siddhant Sharma, Sri Devi	2:35
6.	"Govinda Govinda (Remix)"	Manojava Galgali, L. V. Revanth	3:53
Total length:			23:56

== Reception ==
=== Critical response ===
The Times of India scored the film at 2 out of 5 stars and says "Aneesh has done a good job with dialogue delivery and body language. Sindhu needs to improve her dialogue delivery. Richard Louis' track is good but could have been done better. Music by Mantra Anand and camera by Vishweshwara are okay". B S Srivani of Deccan Herald wrote "By the time the film picks up in the second half, interest dwindles to an insignificant speck. Barring Rani's mute act, the film fails to rise above mediocrity. Telugu cinema has already experimented with such urban themes. Coffee with my wife is just the latest addition". Sify wrote "Vishweshwar's camerawork is commendable, while Mantra Anand's music is average. Madan who is well known in the Telugu industry fails to conceptualize a good screenplay. All in all a mediocre film which fails to hold the audience's interest. It would be better to have a cup of coffee at the comfort of your home than watching Coffee With My Wife". A Sharadhaa of The New Indian Express wrote "Tejas justifies the role of a software engineer while Sindhu comes out of her homely image with this film. A mixture of comedy and drama - when it's funny, it's terrific. However the movie may not pander to audience's tastes much because 'breaking news' TV has desensitised them to such unnecessary prying into other's lives. The Verdict: A right film for newly-wed couples who can watch out for the romance and its after effects".
