= Love in Mandya =

- Film poster
- Directed by: Arasu Anthare
- Written by: Arasu Anthare
- Screenplay by: Arasu Anthare
- Produced by: Uday K. Mehta
- Starring: Sathish Ninasam; Sindhu Lokanath
- Cinematography: Jnanamurthy
- Edited by: Akshay P. Rao
- Music by: Anoop Seelin
- Production company: Sri Venkateshwara Krupa Entertainers
- Release date: 28 November 2014
- Running time: 120 minutes
- Country: India
- Language: Kannada
- Budget: ₹3 crore (US$310,000)

Love in Mandya (Kannada: ಲವ್ ಇನ್ ಮಂಡ್ಯ) is a 2014 Indian Kannada language romance film written and directed by Arasu Anthare. It stars Sathish Ninasam and Sindhu Lokanath in the lead roles. The supporting cast features Shille Manjunath, Prakash Shenoy, Jayashree Krishna and Rajendra Kamath.

Prior to its release, the soundtracks "Currentu Hodha Timealli" and "Opkondbutlu Kanla" from the film became widely popular having gone viral in the social media. Upon its theatrical release on 28 November, the film opened to generally positive response from critics and audience alike, with the performances of Sathish, Sindhu Lokanath and Shille Manjunath receiving praise.

== Cast ==
- Sathish Ninasam as Karna
- Sindhu Lokanath as Sushma
- Shille Manjunath as Shille
- Baby Bhavana as Putti
- Prakash Shenoy
- Jayashree Krishna
- Rajendra Karanth as Periyandavan
- Rockline Sudhakar as Basappa
- Bus Kumar
- Vasu
- Giri Krishna
- H.M.Vijay kumar
- Mruthyuanjaya Hiremata

== Production ==
Arasu Anthare, lyricist who worked in Kannada cinema, turned director for the first time through the film. It was announced that Sathish Ninasam and Sindhu Lokanath would be playing the lead roles in the film. Filming began in October 2013. Filming was done in a schedule of 45 days in places such as Bangalore, Mandya, Hosur, Krishnagiri among other places. Shooting for the filming wrapped up in late May 2014.

It was revealed that Sathish Ninasam, who had played the roles of a boy from Mandya speaking the Mandya dialect of the Kannada language, would be playing a similar role in the film, as a cable connector.

== Soundtrack ==
Love in Mandya

Soundtrack album by Anoop Seelin
- Released: 22 August 2014
- Genre: Feature film soundtrack
- Length: 17:26
- Label: Anand Audio

Anoop Seelin chronology
Rose (2014)	Love in Mandya (2014)

Anoop Seelin composed the background score for the film and music for the soundtracks. Lyrics for the soundtracks were penned by Arasu Anthare. The album consists of five soundtracks. The number "Currentu Hodha Timealli" was sung by Bappi Lahiri and Sinchana Dixit, with the former making his debut in Kannada films. The song proved to be a success after it went viral on YouTube and other social networking sites.

Track list
No.	Title	Lyrics	Singer(s)	Length
1.	"Currentu Hodha Timealli"	Arasu Anthare	Bappi Lahiri, Sinchana Dixit	4:00
2.	"Opkondbutlu Kanla"	Arasu Anthare	Anoop Seelin	3:48
3.	"Lo Maava"	Arasu Anthare	L. N. Shastri, Master Rajkumar	2:47
4.	"Ooru Keri Buttu"	Arasu Anthare	Nakul Abhyankar	2:45
5.	"Ondu Aproopada Gaana"	Arasu Anthare	K. S. Chithra, Rajesh Krishnan	4:06
Total length:				17:26

=== Reception ===
Sunayana Suresh of The Times of India reviewed the album and called it a "typical commercial soundtrack, with buffet of different tunes." She wrote that the soundtrack "Currentu Hodha Timealli" stands out in the album. The soundtrack "Opkondbutlu Kanla" also received appreciation for its tune.

== Release and reception ==
The film released theatrically on 28 November 2014. It opened to positive reviews from film critics and audiences alike. The performances of the lead pair in the film Sathish Ninasam and Sindhu Lokanath received appreciation from critics, and some went on to credit the film's screenplay and direction.

Bharath Bhat of the Filmibeat reviewed the filming giving it a 3.5/5 rating and praised the screenplay and the performances of the lead actors in the film, and called the film "very entertaining and full of youthful exuberance." Writing for Kannada Prabha, Guruprasad felt that the film with a simple love story set in the village backdrop, stands tall in the era of action films. He praised the film's screenplay, direction, cinematography and the performances of the lead pair. A. Sharadhaa of The New Indian Express called the film "A Sweet Rural Romance" and wrote, "Arasu in his very first debut feature has moved away from urban situations and city-bred characters, portraying the rural space in a convincing manner." Of the performances of Sathish Ninasam and Sindhu Lokanath, she wrote, "Satish as a romantic hero essays his part with charming naturalness. His mischievous behaviour blends well with Sindhu Lokanth's enchanting presence. The chemistry between the two works well with their gestures and looks. Dazzling with his humorous, angry and romantic turns, Satish has given one of his best performances till date." and concluded crediting the film's cinematography and music. G. S. Kumar of The Times of India gave the film a rating of 3/5 and wrote, "Though the story line sounds interesting, Love in Mandya, the debut endeavour of lyricist Arasu Anthare, falls flat due to poor narration. In many times, bad editing plays the villain." and added writing praises of the performances of Sathish, Sindhu Lokanath and Manju, and the film's music. However, S. Viswanath of Deccan Herald felt the film was "insufferable" and that it "ends in mindless mayhem." He felt the film's only highlight is its music.

=== Box office ===
Made with a budget of ₹3 crore (US$310,000), the film recovered it in four days from release. The film went on to perform well at the box-office and completed a run of over 50 days in theatres. It was declared a commercial success.
