= BR Sharath =

Indian cricketer (born 1996)

Personal information
- Full name: Belur Ravi Sharath
- Born: 28 September 1996 (age 30); Bangalore, Karnataka, India
- Batting: Right-handed
- Role: Wicket-keeper

Domestic team information
- Years: Team
- 2018–present: Karnataka
- 2024: Gujarat Titans

Career statistics
Competition	FC	LA	T20
Matches	13	27	23
Runs scored	349	601	276
Batting average	18.36	40.06	15.33
100s/50s	1/0	0/4	0/1
Top score	103	90	50
Catches/stumpings	48/6	38/7	15/6
- Source: ESPNcricinfo, 11 November 2020

Belur Ravi Sharath (born 28 September 1996) is an Indian cricketer who plays for Karnataka in domestic cricket and has appeared for Gujarat Titans in the Indian Premier League. He is a Wicket-keeper Batsman. He scored a century on debut against 2017–18 champions of Ranji Trophy (Vidarbha cricket team) on 14 November 2018 at the Vidarbha Cricket Association Stadium. He was part of the Karnataka cricket team squad through the Ranji Trophy season of 2018–19 as the squad reached semi finals.

Sharath made his Twenty20 debut for Karnataka on 44 January 2018 against Jharkhand at Kolkata. He made his List A cricket debut for Karnataka on 13 February 2018 against Odisha at the Alur. In the Karnataka Premier League he has played for Namma Shivamogga team. He also represented South Zone cricket team in the under 19s in the 2015–16 season.

In November 2019, he was named as the captain of India's squad for the 2019 ACC Emerging Teams Asia Cup in Bangladesh.
