= Tuglak =

2012 Kannada film

- Directed by: Aravind Kaushik
- Starring: Rakshit Shetty; Meghana Gaonkar; Anisha Ummer
- Cinematography: Manu Yapler
- Music by: Arjun Janya
- Production company: White Ayre Entertainment
- Release date: 10 February 2012
- Country: India
- Language: Kannada

Tuglak is a 2012 Indian Kannada-language film directed by Aravind Kaushik, starring Rakshit Shetty, Meghana Gaonkar and Anisha Ummer.

== Cast ==
- Rakshit Shetty as Raaghu
- Meghana Gaonkar as Sonia
- Anisha Ummer as Sania
- B. Suresha as a don
- Giri
- Balu Nagendra
- Venkat Shastry
- Kailash
- Rishab Shetty
- Vaijanath Biradar
- Bank Janardhan

== Music ==
Tuglak

Soundtrack album by Arjun Janya
- Released: 2012
- Recorded: 2012
- Genre: Feature film soundtrack
- Length: 23:31
- Language: Kannada

Official audio
- Tuglak - Full Album on YouTube

Track listing
No.	Title	Singer(s)	Length
1.	"Maintain Madthavano"	Akanksha Badami, Tippu	4:50
2.	"Nee Ir Bekitilli"	Anuradha Bhat, Vijay Prakash	5:18
3.	"Tugalak Theme 1"	Stephen	0:51
4.	"Lesa Ilesa"	Arjun Janya	4:51
5.	"Boondh Boondh"	Pratheek	5:09
6.	"Tugalak Theme 2"	Stephan	3:12
Total length:			23:31

== Reception ==
=== Critical response ===
R G Vijayasarathy of Rediff.com scored the film at 2.5 out of 5 stars and says "Arjun's music is passable. Camerawork by Manu Apler is a major highlight of the film. The film could have been more engaging and interesting". Bangalore Mirror wrote "Anisha Umar, in her first Kannada film, is passable and Meghana has just added another film to her list. B Suresha in the role of a don is neither scary or funny. The camerawork and the editing where the cuts are invisible are the plus points of the film. Otherwise, the director should take the blame. Period". Deccan Herald wrote "“Tuglak” lives up to its title. An effort that holds itself back just short of brilliance, “Tuglak” simplifies the dilemma many face, but leaves the audience dissatisfied. Just as the sultan of yore, perhaps?"
