= Arjun Gowda =

2021 Indian Kannada crime-action film

- Release Poster
- Directed by: Lucky Shankar
- Written by: Pavan Ranadheera
- Story by: Lucky Shankar
- Produced by: Ramu
- Starring: Prajwal Devaraj; Priyanka Thimmesh
- Cinematography: Jai Anandh
- Edited by: Arjun Kittu
- Music by: Dharma Vish
- Production company: Ramu Films
- Release date: December 31, 2021
- Running time: 133 minutes
- Country: India
- Language: Kannada

Arjun Gowda is a 2021 Indian Kannada-language crime action film written and directed by Lucky Shankar, making his debut. It features Prajwal Devaraj and Priyanka Thimmesh in the lead roles. The supporting cast includes Sparsha Rekha, Rahul Dev, and Sadhu Kokila. The score and soundtrack for the film is by Dharma Vish and the cinematography is by Jai Anand. The film marked producer Ramu's last film as a producer before his death in April 2021.

== Premise ==
Arjun Gowda is a hot headed youngster, who will do anything for his love. When he faces a crisis that hits home, quite literally, he gets a rude awakening. How, he solves the mess, forms the rest of the story.

== Cast ==
- Prajwal Devaraj as Arjun Gowda
- Priyanka Thimmesh as Jaanu
- Sparsha Rekha as Janaki Gowda
- Rahul Dev
- Sadhu Kokila
- Dinesh Mangaluru
- Arvindh Rau
- Deepak Shetty
- Prakashnatana
- Shobith
- Jeevan
- Giri
- Kadipudi Chandru
- Hassine Shetty
- Suraj

== Production and Release ==
The shoot of the film started in August 2019, in and around Bengaluru. The film had Prajwal Devaraj teaming up with producer Ramu for the second time after Sagar. The film featured him in the role of a kickboxer. The film later had Priyanka Thimmesh as the female lead for the film. The film later had Sparsha Rekha on board to play a pivotal role in the film. The film team completed the shoot in Early 2020. The team released its first teaser on 2 August 2019. The film was earlier slated to release in April 2021 but owing to COVID-19 pandemic postponed its release to December 31, 2021. the first trailer of the film was released on 10 April 2021 and the second trailer of the film was released on 28 December 2021.

== Soundtrack ==
Arjun Gowda

Soundtrack album by Dharma Vish
- Genre: Feature film soundtrack
- Language: Kannada
- Label: Anand Audio
- Producer: Ramu

The film's background score and the soundtracks are composed by Dharma Vish. The music rights were acquired by Anand Audio.

Tracklist
No.	Title	Lyrics	Singer(s)	Length
1.	"Kanavarike Ninnade"	Ragvendra Kamath	Sanjith Hegde	3:23
2.	"Maar Maar Maar"	Lucky Shankar, Chirayu	Anthony Daasan, Chirayu	3:25
3.	"Jayanna Kelu Bhoganna"	Lucky Shankar	Rajguru Hoskote, Pavan Ranadheera	2:36
4.	"Om Namaha Premam"	Kaviraj (lyricist)	Indu Nagaraj	2:51
Total length:				15:22

== Reception ==
=== Critical reception ===
The Times of India gave 2.5/5 stating "Arjun Gowda tries to be a film with social commentary and also a love story at the same time, without forgetting the commercial requisites. This is where the film falters. The makers could have focused on just one of them and probably the story could have had its desired impact"

The New Indian Express gave 3/5 stating "Prajwal Devaraj gives an all-around performance. Priyanka Thimmesh has tried to justify her space and Sparsha Rekha makes her presence felt. Sadhu Kokila’s comic episodes have no connection with the film’s story."

=== Response ===
The film received a mixed response from the audience and the film became another flop for Prajwal at the box office.
