= Dheemaku =

Indian Kannada-language romantic comedy film

- VCD cover
- Directed by: Magesh Kumar G
- Written by: Shankar Billemane (dialogue)
- Screenplay by: Magesh Kumar G Shankar Billemane; Vinod Panna; Naveen Krishna
- Story by: Magesh Kumar G Naveen Krishna
- Produced by: Pushpaa Srinivasa Murthy
- Starring: Naveen Krishna; Pavani; Flora Saini; Rangayana Raghu
- Cinematography: A Vinod Bharathi
- Edited by: Basavaraj Urs
- Music by: Arjun Janya
- Production company: Sri Ambika Combaines
- Release date: 11 September 2008
- Country: India
- Language: Kannada

Dheemaku is a 2008 Indian Kannada-language romantic comedy film directed by Magesh Kumar G. The film stars Naveen Krishna, Pavani, Flora Saini and Rangayana Raghu. The film was released to average reviews.The film received cult status and has large fan following now.

== Cast ==
- Naveen Krishna as Balamurali Krishna
- Pavani as Priya
- Flora Saini as Indira Devi
- Rangayana Raghu
- Sudha Belawadi
- Bullet Prakash
- Ramesh Bhat
- Sundar Raj
- Yashwant Sardeshpande

Special appearances

- Om Prakash Rao
- Jaggesh as Jaggesh alias Jaggi
- Komal Kumar as Komal Kumar alias KK

== Soundtrack ==
The music was composed by Arjun Janya.

No.	Title	Lyrics	Singer(s)	Length
1.	"Maribeda"	Harshapriya	Naveen Krishna	4:03
2.	"Kaasidre"	Srinivasamurthy	Srinivasamurthy, Vinod Panna	1:23
3.	"Kanna Gudde"	Naveen Krishna	Naveen Krishna, Nanditha	4:58
4.	"Romeo Juliet"	Naveen Krishna, Harshapriya	Shankar Shanbog, Arjun, Naveen Krishna, Vijay	3:41
5.	"Huccha Annu"	Harshapriya	Udit Narayan, K. S. Chithra	4:06
6.	"Nodei Kanta"	V. Manohar	Hemanth, Badri Prasad, B Jayashree, Usha, Srinivasamurthy	3:33
7.	"Suryane"	Kaviraj	Adnan Sami	4:21
8.	"Suprabhatha"	Krishnegowda	Krishnegowda	1:42
Total length:				27:47

== Reception ==
R. G. Vijayasarathy of Rediff.com rated the film 2/5 stars and wrote, "Watch Dheemaaku for Naveen Krishna's lively performance only". A critic from Bangalore Mirror rated the film 2.5/5 stars and wrote, "Dheemaku raises the bar as far as the way Kannada films look and feel. The director is ably aided by some good camerawork and songs".
