= Vaasu Naan Pakka Commercial =

- Directed by: Ajithvasan Uggina
- Written by: Ajithvasan Uggina
- Produced by: Anish Tejeshwar
- Starring: Anish Tejeshwar; Nishvika Naidu
- Cinematography: Dilip Chakravarthy
- Edited by: Srikanth Gowda
- Music by: B. Ajaneesh Loknath
- Production company: Winkwhistle Productions
- Release date: 3 August 2018
- Running time: 138 minutes
- Country: India
- Language: Kannada

Vaasu Naan Pakka Commercial is a 2018 Kannada-language masala film written and directed by Ajithvasan Uggina and produced by Anish Tejeshwar. The film stars Anish Tejashwar and Nishvika Naidu in the lead roles, while Raj Deepak Shetty, Avinash Yelandur, Archana Kottige and Manjunath Hegde appear in supporting roles.

== Synopsis ==
Mahalakshmi is the daughter of a rich business tycoon named Janardhan who is madly in love with Vaasu, a son of a real-estate broker. However, a misunderstanding between the duo separates them. How Vaasu reunites with Mahalakshmi forms the crux of the story.

== Cast ==
- Anish Tejeshwar as Vasudev aka Vaasu
- Nishvika Naidu as Mahalakshmi
- Avinash as CI
- Raj Deepak Shetty as Janardhan, Mahalakshmi's father
- Archana Kottige as Vaasu's sister
- Manjunath Hegde as Vaasu's father
- Aruna Balraj
- Vinay Krishnaswamy
- Nandagopal MK as Nanda

== Soundtrack ==
| No. | Title | Singer(s) | Length |
|---|---|---|---|
| 1. | "Rangeride" | Puneeth Rajkumar, C. R. Bobby | 03:28 |
| 2. | "Laila Oh Laila" | Sanjith Hegde, B. Ajaneesh Loknath | 04:56 |
| 3. | "Helubaa Yenudena" | B. Ajaneesh Loknath | 05:14 |
| 4. | "Ivanobba Porki" | Anish Tejeshwar | 03:33 |

== Critical reception ==
Sunayana Suresh of The Times of India gave 2.5/5 stars and wrote "Vaasu Naan Pakka Commercial might just be the film you choose to watch if you're looking for the masala entertainer with songs, action, comedy and romance."
