= Aniissh Tejeshwar =

Indian actor

- Born: Bengaluru, Karnataka, India
- Occupations: Actor; Producer; Director
- Years active: 2010–present

Aniissh Tejeshwar (born 12 January 1989) Indian actor, producer, and director who works predominantly in Kannada cinema. He made his acting debut in 2010 with the Kannada film Nam Areal Ond Dina, and has since appeared in several notable films, including Police Quarters (2010), Akira (2016), Vaasu Naan Pakka Commercial (2018), and Ramarjuna (2021), the latter marking his directorial debut.

== Early life ==
Aniissh Tejeshwar was born in Bengaluru, Karnataka, India, into a business family. His father is a businessman, and Aniissh was initially expected to join the family business. However, driven by his passion for acting, he decided to pursue a career in films. In his early days, Aniissh famously “googled how to become an actor,” which led him to create a professional portfolio. His portfolio was featured on the cover of a Hyderabad-based magazine, which attracted attention from filmmakers. Before entering films, he completed a one-year acting course to understand the craft thoroughly.

== Career ==
Aniissh made his acting debut with Police Quarters (2010) and in the same year, he appeared in Nam Areal Ond Dina. In 2013, he starred in Coffee With My Wife, a romantic drama.

In 2014, Aniissh featured in Nan Life Alli as Deepu and Endendu Ninagagi as Gowtham, both films focusing on urban romance and youth-centric themes. In 2015, he played Krishna in Neene Bari Neene. Aniissh starred in Akira (2016).

Aniissh ventured into production with Vaasu Naan Pakka Commercial (2018), where he also played the lead role of Vaasu. In 2021, he made his directorial debut with Ramarjuna, in which he starred as Ram. The film received positive reviews for its action sequences and emotional depth.

Aniissh appeared in Mayanagari (2023) and Aaraam Arvind Swamy (2024). His 2025 releases include Forest and Love OTP, the latter also directed by him and shot in Telugu.

== Filmography ==
| Year | Title | Role | Notes |
|---|---|---|---|
| 2010 | Police Quarters | Ashwin | |
| 2010 | Nam Areal Ond Dina | Chinna | |
| 2013 | Coffee With My Wife | Charan | |
| 2014 | Nan Life Alli | Deepu | |
| 2014 | Endendu Ninagagi | Gowtham | |
| 2015 | Neene Bari Neene | Krishna | |
| 2016 | Akira | Akhil Raj | |
| 2018 | Vaasu Naan Pakka Commercial | Vaasu | Also producer |
| 2021 | Ramarjuna | Ram | Also director and producer |
| 2023 | Mayanagari | Shankar | credited as Aniish |
| 2024 | Aaraam Arvind Swamy | Arvind | |
| 2025 | Forest | Sathisha | |
| 2025 | Love OTP | Akshay | Also shot in Telugu; Also director |
