= Prajwal Devaraj =

Indian film actor

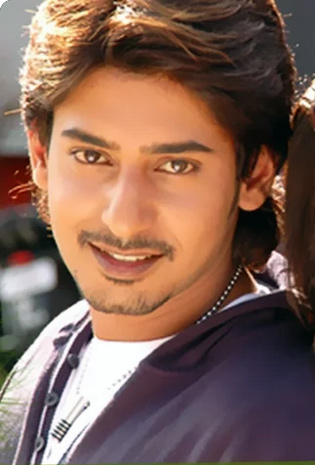
- Prajwal Devaraj in 2015
- Born: 4 July 1987 (age 39); Bangalore, Karnataka, India
- Education: Jain University, Bengaluru
- Occupation: Actor
- Years active: 2006–present
- Spouse: Ragini Prajwal
- Parent(s): Devaraj; Chandrakala
- Relatives: Pranam Devaraj (brother)

Prajwal Devaraj (born 4 July 1987) is an Indian actor who works in Kannada cinema. The son of veteran actor Devaraj, Prajwal made his debut with the Kannada film Sixer (2007) for which he won the Best Debut actor award at the Suvarna Film Awards. This was followed by the gangster drama Geleya (2007) which was a box-office success. Prajwal was in recent films like Chowka (2017), Gentleman (2020) and Inspector Vikram(2021) Karavali(2026).

His films include Meravanige (2008), Gulama (2009), Murali Meets Meera (2011), Super Shastri (2013) and Galaate (2013). For his performance in Gentleman (2020), he won the Karnataka State Film Award for Best Actor.

== Early life ==
Prajwal Devaraj was born on 4 July 1987 in Bengaluru, Karnataka, India, to actor Devaraj and Chandralekha, a former actress and producer. He has a younger brother, Pranam, who acted in Kumari 21F (2018). Prajwal completed his schooling at Sri Aurobindo Memorial School, Bengaluru, and graduated with a degree in Management from Jain University’s Center for Management Studies. Before entering films, he trained in dance and participated in cultural programs.

== Career ==
=== 2007–2010: Debut and Early Success ===
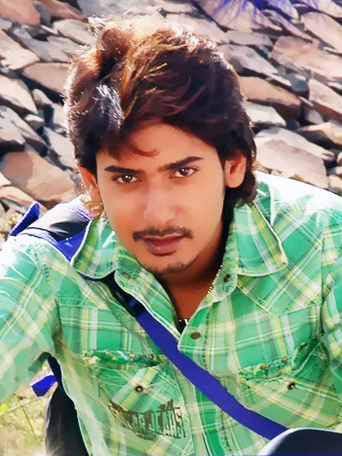
Prajwal during a shoot for the film Geleya in 2007

Prajwal made his debut as a lead actor in Sixer (2007), playing Rahul, a young underworld don. Directed by Shashank, the film earned him the Suvarna Film Award for Best Debut Actor. The same year, he starred in Geleya, a gangster drama directed by A. Harsha. He continued his success with romantic dramas like Meravanige (2008) and Gange Baare Thunge Baare (2008).

=== 2011–2016: Establishing as a Leading Actor ===
Prajwal appeared in films such as Murali Meets Meera (2011), a romantic drama, and Super Shastri (2012),. Other notable releases include Galaate (2013), Angaaraka (2014), and Neenade Naa (2014), his first home production. In Bhujanga (2016), his 25th film, Prajwal played a mass hero role, marking a shift toward action-oriented characters.

=== 2017–2021: Critical Acclaim ===
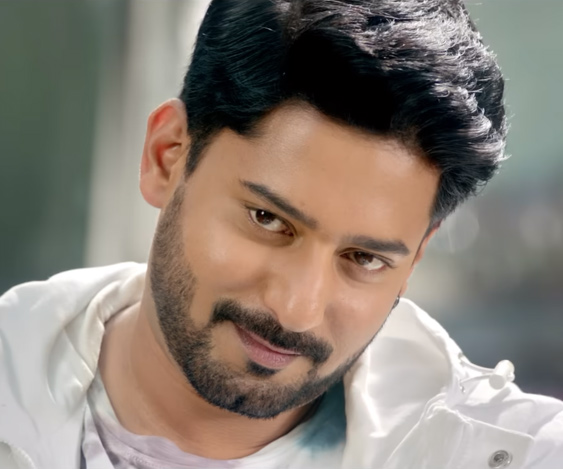
Prajwal in 2023

Prajwal’s performance in Chowka (2017), a multi-starrer directed by Tharun Sudhir, was widely appreciated. His career-defining role came in Gentleman (2020), directed by Jadesh Kumar Hampe, where he portrayed Bharath, a man with narcolepsy. The film earned him the Karnataka State Film Award for Best Actor and the SIIMA Critics Award for Best Actor – Kannada.

=== 2022–Present: Latest projects ===
Recent works include Abbara (2022), Veeram (2023), and Tatsama Tadbhava (2023), where he played intense roles in thrillers and action dramas. Upcoming projects include Gana, Rakshasa, and Mafia.

== Personal life ==
Prajwal married Ragini Chandran, a dancer and actress, on 25 October 2015 after a decade-long relationship. Ragini has appeared in Kannada films and is known for her Kathak performances.

== Filmography ==
Key
†	Denotes films that have not yet been released

Year	Title	Role(s)	Notes	Ref.
2007	Sixer	Rahul	Won—Suvarna Best Debut Actor	
2007	Geleya	Guru		
2008	Gange Baare Thunge Baare	Harsha		
2008	Meravanige	Vijay		
2009	Jeeva	Jeeva		
2009	Gulama	Anil		
2009	Kencha	Rahul		
2010	Nannavanu	Bharadwaj		
2011	Kote	Vignesh		
2011	Murali Meets Meera	Murali		
2011	Mr. Duplicate	Nandu		
2011	Bhadra	Bhadra		
2012	Sagar	Sagar		
2012	Gokula Krishna	Krishna		
2012	Super Shastri	Subramanya Shastri		
2013	Galaate	Abhi		
2013	Ziddi	Krishna		
2014	Angaaraka	Viji		
2014	Savaal	Arjun		
2014	Jamboo Savari	Balu		
2014	Neenade Naa	Dev	First home production film	
2015	Mrugashira	Prajwal		
2015	Arjuna	Arjun		
2016	Madha Mathu Manasi	Mass Madha		
2016	Bhujanga	Bhujanga	25th film	
2017	Chowka	Mohammed Anwar		
2018	Life Jothe Ondh Selfie	Virat		
2018	Ananthu vs Nusrath	Dr. Nisar Ahmed	Cameo appearance	
2019	Yajamana	Himself	Cameo appearance in the "Shivanandi" song	
2019	Yada Yada Hi Dharmasya	Jeeva	Cameo appearance	
2020	Gentleman	Bharath	Won—SIIMA Award Best Actor Critics – Kannada; Won—Karnataka State Film Award for Best Actor	
2021	Inspector Vikram	Vikram		
2021	Arjun Gowda	Arjun Gowda		
2022	Abbara	Shiva		
2023	Veeram	Veeru		
2023	Tatsama Tadbhava	Aravind Ashwatthama		
2025	Gana	Gana		
2025	Rakshasa	Satya		
2026	Karavali	Dhananjay		
2026	Mafia †	Dr. Sathyanarayan	Filming	

== Television ==
Year	Show	Role	Notes
2021	Dance Dance	Judge	

== Awards and nominations ==
Year	Category	Award	Film	Result	Ref.
2008	Best Debut Male Actor	Suvarna Film Awards	Sixer	Won	
2020	Best Actor	Karnataka State Film Awards	Gentleman	Won	
2020	Best Actor (Critics)	South Indian International Movie Awards	Gentleman	Won	
2020	Best Actor	South Indian International Movie Awards	Gentleman	Nominated	
2020	Best Actor – Kannada	Filmfare Awards South	Gentleman	Nominated	
