= Sindhu Loknath =

Indian actress and model

- Born: Sindhu C. L. Kodagu, Karnataka, India
- Occupations: Actress, model
- Years active: 2009–present
- Spouse: Shreyas (m. 2022)

Sindhu, known by her stage name Sindhu Loknath, is an Indian actress and model who predominantly appears in Kannada cinema. She made her debut in films, with a cameo role in Parichaya (2009). She is recognized for her performances in Lifeu Ishtene (2011), Drama (2012), Case No. 18/9 (2013) and Love in Mandya (2014).

== Early life ==
Born as Sindhu in Bangalore in the Indian state of Karnataka, Sindhu Loknath was born into what she calls "an extremely conservative family". She obtained a Master of Science degree in Biotechnology from Reva University Bangalore. She took to acting and made her debut appearing in a cameo role in the 2009 Kannada film Parichaya.

== Career ==
Following her first screen appearance in Parichaya, Sindhu was cast as Nandini by director Pawan Kumar in his film Lifeu Ishtene, that released in 2011. Sindhu got recognized for her performance in the film. Around this time, she appeared in cameo roles in Telugu and Tamil films such as Allam Vellulli (2009), Vaada Poda Nanbargal (2011) and Muppozhudhum Un Karpanaigal (2012). In the 2012 comedy film Drama directed by Yogaraj Bhat, she was cast as Chandrika, a mute girl and the love interest of a character played by Sathish Ninasam. The film emerged as a success with its ensemble cast including Sindhu receiving critical praise. For her performance in the film she earned nominations for Filmfare Award for Best Supporting Actress – Kannada and SIIMA Award for Best Actress in a Supporting Role. In the same year, she appeared in Yaare Koogadali in a supporting role.

She was a model for print and corporate ads like Nelli Silks, Samyak, Lawerence and Mayo, Assendas India, Radio One, Arogya Milk, Lancer and Developers, Canara Bank. She played the love interest of Aneesh Tejeshwar in three consecutive releases, Coffee with My Wife, Nan Life Alli and Endendu Ninagagi. She is being paired with Ajay Rao in Jai Bajrangabali.

== Filmography ==
=== Films ===
- All films are in Kannada, unless otherwise noted.

Key
†	Denotes films that have not yet been released

Year	Film	Role	Notes	Ref.
2009	Parichaya		Cameo role	
2011	Lifeu Ishtene	Nandini		
2011	Vaada Poda Nanbargal		Tamil film	
2012	Muppozhudhum Un Karpanaigal	Radhi	Tamil film; credited as Yashika	
2012	Drama	Chandrika	Nominated, Filmfare Award for Best Supporting Actress – Kannada; Nominated, SIIMA Award for Best Actress in a Supporting Role	
2012	Yaare Koogadali	Kasthuri		
2013	Sandalwood Sa Ri Ga Ma	Herself		
2013	Case No. 18/9	Lakshmi	Nominated, SIIMA Award for Best Actress in a Supporting Role	
2013	Coffee With My Wife	Sindhu		
2014	Nan Life Alli	Mouna		
2014	Endendu Ninagagi	Madhura		
2014	Love in Mandya	Sushma	Nominated, IIFA Award for Best Performance in a Leading Role – Female	
2014	Jai Bajarangabali	Ambuja		
2015	Krishna Leela	Sindhu	Cameo appearance	
2015	Mr. Airavata	Charu	Cameo appearance	
2015	Rakshasi	Bhavani		
2017	Ambar Caterers		Tulu film	
2018	Heegondhu Dina	Jhanavi		
2019	Kaanadante Maayavadanu	Vandana		
2021	Krishna Talkies	Parimala		
2026	Aparichithe	Padma		
2026	Kendada Seragu	Deepa		
TBA	60 Days †		Delayed	

Webseries

- Loose Connection
