= List of Kannada films of 2023 =

This is a list of Kannada films that are scheduled to be released or have been released in 2023.

== Box office collection ==
The highest-grossing Sandalwood films released in 2023, by worldwide box office gross revenue, are as follows:

Highest worldwide gross of 2023
Rank	Title	Production company	Gross	Ref
1	Kaatera	Rockline Productions	₹80 crore (equivalent to ₹87 crore or US$9.1 million in 2026)	
2	Kranti	Media House Studios	₹41 crore (equivalent to ₹45 crore or US$4.6 million in 2026)	
3	Kabzaa	Anand Pandit Motion Pictures	₹27 crore (equivalent to ₹29 crore or US$3.1 million in 2026)	
4	Ghost	Sandesh Productions	₹26.30 crore (equivalent to ₹29 crore or US$3.0 million in 2026)	
5	Sapta Saagaradaache Ello – Side A	Paramvah Studios	₹25 crore (equivalent to ₹27 crore or US$2.8 million in 2026)	
6	Hostel Hudugaru Bekagiddare	Gulmohur Films; Varrun Studios	₹17 crore (equivalent to ₹19 crore or US$1.9 million in 2026)	
7	Sapta Saagaradaache Ello – Side B	Paramvah Studios	₹15.6 crore (US$1.6 million)	
8	Bad Manners	Studio 18	₹6.5 crore (US$670,000)	
9	Gurudev Hoysala	KRG Studios	₹2.6 crore (equivalent to ₹2.8 crore or US$290,000 in 2026)–₹2.9 crore (US$300,000)	

== January – March ==
Opening		Title	Director	Cast	Studio	Ref
J A N U A R Y	6	Cocktail	Sriram Babu	Viren Keshav, Charishma Chondamma, Shivamani, Shobhraj, Ramesh Pandit	Vijayalakshmi Combines	
J A N U A R Y	6	Mr. Bachelor	Naidu Bandar	Darling Krishna, Nimika Ratnakar, Milana Nagaraj, Chikkanna, Sadhu Kokila	Milind Raso Cinemas; Sri Chandra Productions	
J A N U A R Y	6	Mareyade Kshamisu	K. Raghav	Pramod Bopanna, Meghana Gowda, Raghu, Ramesh Bhat	RVS Production	
J A N U A R Y	6	Miss Nandini	Gurudatta S R	Priyanka Upendra, Bala Rajwadi, K. S. Sridhar, Bhavya	Shree Vijay Films	
J A N U A R Y	6	Spooky College	Bharath. G	Vivek Simha, Kushee Ravi, Reeshma Nanaiah, Pruthvi Rashtrakoota	Sri Devi Entertainers	
J A N U A R Y	6	Shri Balaji Photo Studio	Rajesh Dhruva	Rajesh Dhruva, Radhika Achuth Rao, Ravi Salian, Sampath Jayaram, Nakul Sharma, Ravi Mururu, Rakshith Naag, Shubhalakshmi, Shishir	Srujana Productions	
J A N U A R Y	6	Thugs of Ramaghada	Karthik Maralabhavi	Ashwin Hassan, Chandan Raj, Mahalaxmi Annapurna, Sharmila Chandrashekar, Tiger Ganga	Bharat Talkies	
J A N U A R Y	12	Orchestra Mysuru	Sunil Mysooru	Poornachandra Mysore, Rajalakshmi, Dileep Raj, Mahesh Kumar, Ravi Hunsur	Ashwin Creations and Raghu Dixit Productions	
J A N U A R Y	26	Kranti	V. Harikrishna	Darshan, Rachita Ram, Ravichandran	Media House Studio	
J A N U A R Y	26	RC Brothers	L. Prakash Kumar	Kuri Prathap, Tabla Nani, Sambhrama Sree, Nayana Sharath	Anugraha Entertainment	
F E B R U A R Y	3	Nata Bhayankara	Pratham	Pratham, Sai Kumar, Kuri Prathap, Shobharaj, Om Prakash Rao, Vaijanath Biradar	Swarasya Cini Creations	
F E B R U A R Y	10	Hondisi Bareyiri	Ramenahalli Jagannath	Praveen Tej, Bhavana Rao, Aishani Shetty, Naveen Shankar, Samyukta Hornad	Sunday Cinemas	
F E B R U A R Y	10	Rupayi	Jagadal	Krishi Thapanda, Mythri Jaggi, Chandana Raghavendra, Pramod Shetty, Mohan Juneja, Rockline Sudhakar	Vividh Cinemas	
F E B R U A R Y	10	Long Drive	Sri Raju G	Arjun Yogesh Raj, Supritha Sathyanarayan, Tejaswini Shekhar, Manjunath Gowda B.R, Bala Rajwadi	Good Wheel Productions	
F E B R U A R Y	17	Chaos	Dr. GV Prasad	Akshith Shashikumar, Aditi Prabhudeva, Parul Agarwal, Hemachandra Reddy	The Black Pebble Entertainments	
F E B R U A R Y	17	Love Birds	PC Shekhar	Darling Krishna, Milana Nagaraj	Sri Banashankari Chithralaya	
F E B R U A R Y	17	Bari 10% Baddi	Krishna Leela	Lakshmipati Balaji, Niriksha Shetty, Bala Rajwadi	SDR Productions	
F E B R U A R Y	17	Doddahatti Boregowda	K.M. Raghu	Shivanna Beeruhundi, Abhijval Gowda, Lavanya Natana, Kalarati Mahadev, Geeta Rangavalli	Rajar	
F E B R U A R Y	17	Ondolle Love Story	Praveen Sutar	Ashwin N, Dhanushree V	Niranjan Babu	
F E B R U A R Y	17	Sakuchi	Ashok Chakravarty	Trivikram, Diana Mary, Sanjay Raj, Diana Mary, Sanjay Raj	Bagalur Chayashankar Ashwin	
F E B R U A R Y	17	SLV - Siri Lambodara Vivaha	Sourabh Kulkarni, Rajesh Natranga	Anjan A Bharadwaj, Disha Ramesh, Manjunath Gowda B.R, Bala Rajwadi, Shruthi Ramesh		
F E B R U A R Y	24	Gowli	Soora	Srinagara Kitty, Paavana Gowda, Rangayana Raghu, Sharath Lohithaswa, Yash Shetty, Cockroach Sudhi, Govinde Gowda, Gurudeshpande, Child Artist Namana, Murudayya	Sohan Film Factory	
F E B R U A R Y	24	Juliet 2: Behind The Dark Door	Virat B Gowda	Brinda Acharya, Anoop Sagar, Kush Acharya, Srikanth Sriki	R Productions	
F E B R U A R Y	24	South Indian Hero	Naresh Kumar	Sarthak Lucky, Kaashima Rafi, Urvashi Roy, Vijay Chendoor	Riyanshi Films	
F E B R U A R Y	24	Vidhi (Article) 370	K. Shankar	Shashikumar, Shruti, Doddarange Gowda, Shivaram, Avinash, Ramesh Bhat	Lyra Entertainment & Media	
M A R C H	3	19.20.21	Mansore	Rajesh Nataranga, Balaji Manohar, Avinash, Shrunga B. V., M. D. Pallavi Arun	D Creations; Sathya Hegde Studios	
M A R C H	3	Dooradarshana	Sukesh Shetty	Pruthvi Ambaar, Ayaana, Sundar Veena, Ugram Manju, Harini Shreekanth	V S Media Enterprises	
M A R C H	3	Kaasina Sara	N. R. Nanjunde Gowda	Vijay Raghavendra, Harshika Poonacha, Umashree, Neenasam Ashwath, Sudha Belawadi	Native Creations	
M A R C H	3	Kadalatheerada Bhargava	Pannaga Somashekar	Bharat Gowda T. K., Shruti Prakash, Patel Varun Raj, K. S. Shridhar, Raghav Nag, Ashwin Hassan	Evakala Studio	
M A R C H	10	Chowkabara	Vikram Suri	Vihaan Prabhanjan, Namitha Rao, Kavya Ramesh, Seetha Kote, Kiran Vati	Navi Nirmiti	
M A R C H	10	Mandala: The UFO Incident	Ajay Sarpeshkar	Anant Nag, Prakash Belawadi, Kiran Srinivas, Samyukta Hornad	Ajay Sarpeshkar Films	
M A R C H	17	Kabzaa	R. Chandru	Upendra, Shriya Saran, Sudeepa, Murali Mohan, Shiva Rajkumar	Anand Pandit Motion Pictures; Sri Siddheshwara Enterprises	
M A R C H	30	Gurudev Hoysala	Vijay N.	Dhananjaya, Amrutha Iyengar	KRG Studios	

== April – June ==
Opening		Title	Director	Cast	Studio	Ref
A P R I L	7	Nam Naani Maduve Prasanga	Hemanth Hegde	Hemanth Hegde, Gitanjali Mangal, Shruti Nandeesh, Shreya Vasant, Rajesh Nataranga, Padmaja Rao	SVM Productions; Anvita Arts	
A P R I L	7	Pentagon	Guru Deshpande	Kishore, Pruthvi Ambaar, Pritika Deshpande, Pramod Shetty, P. Ravishankar, Prakash Belawadi	G Cinemas	
A P R I L	7	Praveena	Mahesh Sindhuvalli	Shashi Gowda, Vijay Karthik, Aishwarya Gowda, Mandya Ramesh	Rishi Pictures	
A P R I L	7	Ramachari 2.0	Thej	Thej, Swati Prabhu, Vijay Chendoor, Chandana Raghavendra, Raghavendra Rajkumar, Sparsha Rekha, Kausthubhamani	Panoramic Studio	
A P R I L	7	Veeram	Khadar Kumar S	Prajwal Devaraj, Rachita Ram, Srinagar Kitty, Shruti, Shishya Deepak, Achyuth Kumar	Shashidhar Studios Production	
A P R I L	14	Avantika	Kempegowda Magadi	Arpith Gowda, Amritha Nair, Rathnachandana, Ramesh Bhat, Ramesh Pandit	Rathnachandana Productions	
A P R I L	14	Mariguddada Gaddadharigalu	R. Chandrakanth	Dinesh Kumar, Praveen Raj, Namratha Agasimani, Ganesh Rao, Avinash	D. J. Prakash Cine Production	
A P R I L	14	Shivaji Surathkal 2	Akash Srivatsa	Ramesh Aravind, Radhika Chetan, Meghana Gaonkar, Nassar, Vinayak Joshi, Sangeetha Sringeri	KRG Studios	
A P R I L	14	Suraari	Vishal Ajay	Vishal Ajay, Om Prakash Rao, Avinash, Chitral Rangaswamy, Archana Singh, Mimicry Gopi	Iris Studio	
A P R I L	14	Undenama	K. L. Rajshekar	Komal Kumar, Dhanya Balakrishna, Tabla Nani, Tanisha Kuppanda, Harish Raj, Bank Janardhan	Crystal Paark Cinemas; N K Studios	
A P R I L	21	Bisilu Kudure	Hridaya Shiva	Sampath Maitreya, Kari Subbu, Malavalli Saikrishna	Metaphor Media House	
A P R I L	21	Chandini Bar	Raghavendra Kumar	Raghavendra Kumar, Sukruthi Prabhakar, Siddesh Badanalavu, Sampath Maitreya	Camera Movies	
A P R I L	21	English Manja	Arya M Mahesh	Pramod Panju, Tejaswini Sharma, Sunil Puranik, V. Nagendra Prasad, Victory Vasu, Nagendra Urs	Infant Cine Creations	
A P R I L	21	Maavu Bevu	Suchendra Prasad	Sandeep Ninasam, Chaitra H. G., Danny Kuttappa, Surpriya S. Rao, Srinivasa Murthy, Sundarashree	Sri Sai Gagana Productions	
A P R I L	21	Magale	Somu Kengeri	Gururaj Shetty, Bishan Shetty, Greeshma Sridhar, Bindu Raxidi, Supritha Raj	Zed Net Communications	
A P R I L	21	Nannaki	Mallu Jhamkandi	Mallu Jhamkandi, Shivaganga, Anand Hunnur, Rekha Das	Mallu Jhamkandi Films	
A P R I L	21	Nodadha Putagalu	Vasanth Kumar	Preetham Makkhihali, Kavya Ramesh, Vilas Kulkarni, Gowtham G.	Sweet & Salt Movies	
A P R I L	21	Ramzan	Panchakshari C. E.	Sangamesh Upase, Premavathi Upase, Baby Ishani	Universal Studio	
A P R I L	28	Raaghu	M. Anand Raj	Vijay Raghavendra	DKS Studios; Kota Film Factory	
A P R I L	28	Raghavendra Stores	Santhosh Ananddram	Jaggesh, Shwetha Srivatsav, Ravishankar Gowda	Hombale Films	
M A Y	12	Feel My Love	D T Ramesh	Rakesh K P, Charithra Rao	GP productions	
M A Y	12	Present Prapancha 0% Love	Abhiraam	Arjun Manjunath, Sambrama Sree, Akshatha Kukki, Yashas Abhi, S. Narayan, Tabla Nani	Friends Media Production	
M A Y	19	Daredevil Musthafa	Shashank Soghal	Shishira Baikady, Adithya Shree, Prerana Gowda, Poornachandra Mysuru, Nagabhushana	Cinemamara	
M A Y	19	Jersey Number 10	Adyah Thimmaiah	Adyah Thimmaiah, Dattanna, Thriller Manju, Chandan Achar	Adyah Koteshwara Films	
M A Y	19	Sreemanta	Hassan Ramesh	Sonu Sood, Vaishnavi Patwardhan, Vaishnavi Menon, Kranti Revanna Siddappa, Ramesh Bhat, Sadhu Kokila, Ravishankar Gowda	Golden Rain Films	
M A Y	19	Suman	Sathyajith	Dharma Keerthiraj, Rajani Bharadwaj, Nimika Ratnakar, Shriya Shukla, Zayleen Ganapathy	MMR Movie Creations	
M A Y	26	Siren	Raja Venkaiya	Praveer Shetty, Lasya Ponnu Ash, Achyuth Kumar, Pavithra Lokesh, Sharath Lohitashwa, Sparsha Rekha	Deccan King Movie Productions	
J U N E	2	Pinki Elli	Prithvi Konanur	Akshatha Pandavapura, Anoop Shoonya, Deepak Subramanya, Gunjalamma	Picture Tree International	
J U N E	2	Hint	Vedhavyaas	Naresh Jayappa, Kavya Sivakumar, M. N. Lakshmi Devi, Mohan Juneja	Veeranjaneya Productions	
J U N E	2	Radha Searching Ramana Missing	M. N. Srikanth	Raghav, Sanjana Burli	Saanvi Picture & Animations	
J U N E	2	Yadha Yadha Hi	Ashok Tej	Diganth, Vasishta N. Simha, Hariprriya, Avinash, Manju Pavagada, Roopalatha	Guys and Dolls Creations	
J U N E	9	Darbar	V. Manohar	Sathish, Jahnavi Raju, Sadhu Kokila, Naveen D. Padil	Darbar Productions	
J U N E	9	Gadhayuddha	Srivathsa Rao	Sumit Shirgurkar, Sadhu Kokila, Ayyappa P. Sharma, Danny Kuttappa, Sharath Lohithaswa, Aishwarya Shindogi, Sparsha Rekha	Nitin Shirgurkar Films	
J U N E	9	Melody Drama	Manju Karthik	Satya Shraya, Supritha Sathyanarayan, Rangayana Raghu, Anu Prabhakar, Chetan Chandra	Primestar Studio Productions	
J U N E	9	Sthabda	Laali Raghav	Pratap Simha, Harshika Poonacha, Raghavendra Rajkumar	Sai Sagar Film Factory	
J U N E	16	Bera	Vinu Balanja	Yash Shetty, Harshika Poonacha, H. G. Dattatreya, Shine Shetty, Suman	SLV Colours	
J U N E	16	Iravan	Ram's Ranga	Karthik Jayaram, Vivek Patil, Adhvithi Shetty, Avinash	Nirantara Productions	
J U N E	16	Kai Jaarida Preethi	Pushpa Bhadravathi	Sanath, Manjushree Shetty, Madhu Shetty, Suman, Danny Kuttappa	The Chaithra Movies	
J U N E	16	Mahabali	Mallesh Yadehalli	Prithvi Raj Mallesh, Manvitha Raj, Aravind	Malasamba Combines	
J U N E	23	Aggrasena	Murugesh Kanappa	Amar Viraj, Rachana Dashrath, Aagasthya Balgere	Vaishnavi Cinemas	
J U N E	23	Road King	Randy Kent	Mateen Hussain, Rukshar Dhillon, Nayana Shetty, Harish Sejekan	Trend Setter Productions	
J U N E	30	90 Bidi Manig Nadi	Gurudatta Ganiga	Vaijanath Biradar, Prashant Siddi, Abhay Veer, Neetha Maindargi, Preethu Pooja	Amma Talkies	
J U N E	30	Kirathaka 2	Pradeep Raj	R. K. Tejas	Jana Chitta Entertainment	
J U N E	30	Bengaluru Boys	Nagaraj Arehole	Sachin Cheluvarayaswamy, Rohith Bhanuprakash, Chikkanna, Abhi Das, Vainidhi Jagadish, Sony Mulewa	V Movie Makers	
J U N E	30	Naanu Kusuma	Krishne Gowda	Krishne Gowda, Greeshma Sridhar	Sapthagiri Creations	

== July–September ==
Opening		Title	Director	Cast	Studio	Ref
J U L Y	7	Arambha	Manjunath Badiger	Pruthviraaj, Nischitha Rao, Ganesh Rao	Sri Kalikadevi Productions	
J U L Y	7	Hatya	Varun Gangadhar	Harry Josh, Komica Anchal, Vikas Gowda, Deekshitha	Sagaram World Cinema	
J U L Y	7	Nano Narayanappa	Kumaar L	KGF Thatha, Prashanth Siddi, Cockroach Sudhir, Apoorva	Kesari Films Capture	
J U L Y	7	Rayaru Bandaru Mavana Manege	Vipul Sharma	Tushar Sadhu, Kinjal Rajpriya	Artmen Films	
J U L Y	7	Sri Prasanna Venkatadaasaru	Madhusudhan Hawaldar	Prabhanjan Deshpande, Vishnutirth Joshi, Vijayanand Naik	Mathambhuja Movies	
J U L Y	14	Aparoopa	Mahesh Babu	Sughosh Gowda, Hrithika Srinivas, Kuri Prathap, Vijay Chendoor, Avinash	Suggi Cinemas	
J U L Y	14	Damayana	Shreemukha	Shreemukha, Anagha Bhat, Adhithya BK, Akshay Revankar	Seventy 7 Studios	
J U L Y	14	Mystery	Shivanandhi TM	Rithvik, Deepa Hebbar, Shridhar Atavi, Sachin Tholanda	Nandhi Production House	
J U L Y	14	Namasthe Ghost	Bharath Nanda	Bharath Nanda, Vidya Raj, Shivamogga Harish, Bala Rajwadi	Chirayu Creative Cinemas	
J U L Y	14	O Manase	D. G. Umesh Gowda	Vijay Raghavendra, Sanchita Padukone, Dharma Keerthiraj, Sadhu Kokila	Sri Friends Movie Makers	
J U L Y	21	Ambuja	Srini Hanumantharaju	Shubha Poonja, Rajini Gowda, Baby Akanksha, Deepak Subramanya, Nisha Hegde	SK Cinemas	
J U L Y	21	David	Shreyas Chinga	Rakesh Adiga, Sarah Harish, Shreyas Chinga, Kavya Shah, Avinash	Mahanandi Productions	
J U L Y	21	Devara Kanasu	Suresh Lakkoor	Deepak Belvathahalli, Mak Mani, Amoolya Arvind, Aarushi Vedhikha	Millenium Productions	
J U L Y	21	Don Kumara	Nagesh Kumar	V. Chandra Shekar, Prakruthi Kausthuba, Sahana Malathker, Namratha Malla	NAK's Movies	
J U L Y	21	Hostel Hudugaru Bekagiddare	Nithin Krishnamurthy	Prajwal BP, Abhi Das, Tejas Jayanna, Manjunath Nayaka, Srivatsa Shyam, Shreyas Sharma, Aniruddha Vendanthi, Archana Kottige, Anoosha K Bhat, Ramya, Pawan Kumar, Diganth, Rishab Shetty	Gulmohur Films; Varrun Studios; Zee Studios	
J U L Y	21	Madhura Kavya	Madhusudhan Kyathanahalli	Madhusudhan Kyathanahalli, Yashoda Gowda, Rajkumar Navik	Vikhyath Creations	
J U L Y	21	Nimmellara Aashirvada	Ravikiran Bhat	Pratik Shetty, Payal Radhakrishna, Aravind Bolar, Swati Gurudutt, Govinde Gowda	Varun Cine Creations	
J U L Y	28	Aachar & Co	Sindhu Sreenivasa Murthy	Sindhu Sreenivasa Murthy, Ashok, Sudha Belawadi, Vamsidhar Bhogaraju, Anirudh Acharya	PRK Productions	
J U L Y	28	Aura	Ashwin Vijayamurthy	A R Rohit, Deepika Aradhya, Anand Ninasam, Sonia Krishnamurthy, Sathya Raj	AR Films	
J U L Y	28	Diamond Cross	Ramdeep Ramegowda	Roger Narayan, Roopika, Rajath Annappa, Manu K Mallegowda	Nagathihalli Cine Creations	
J U L Y	28	Kousalya Supraja Rama	Shashank	Darling Krishna, Brinda Acharya, Milana Nagaraj, Nagabhushana, Rangayana Raghu, Achyuth Kumar	Shashank Cinemass	
J U L Y	28	Nava Itihasa	Sri Rajani	Vikram Sandeep, Amrutha V. Raj, Nandeesh Yadav, Ganesh Prakash, Jyothi Murur	Atharva Creations	
A U G U S T	4	Ee Pattanakke Yenagide	Ravi Subbarao	Ravi Subbarao. Radhika Ram	Ravi Thejo Studios	
A U G U S T	4	Namo Bhoothathma 2	Murali	Komal Kumar, Lekha Chandra, Monica Gowda, Varrun Ravi, Govinde Gowda	Golden Pictures	
A U G U S T	4	Sheela	Balu Narayanan	Ragini Dwivedi, Riyaz Khan, Avinash, Chitra Shenoy	Priya Lakshmi Media Pvt. Ltd.	
A U G U S T	18	Baang	Sree Ganesh Parashuram	Shanvi Srivastava, Raghu Dixit, Shravya Rao, Ritvik Muralidhar, Sunil Gujjar, Natya Ranga	UK Productions	
A U G U S T	18	Kshetrapati	Shrikant Katagi	Naveen Shankar, Archana Jois, Achyuth Kumar, Rahul Ainapur	Ashraga Creations	
A U G U S T	18	Nishachara	S. Bhaskar	Swasthika Poojary	Bellithere Films	
A U G U S T	25	Bayaluseeme	Varun Kattimani	Varun Kattimani, T. S. Nagabharana, P. Ravishankar, Samyukta Hornad, Yash Shetty, Archana Kottige	Sri Gayathridevi Creations; P R S Creations	
A U G U S T	25	Toby	Basil AL Chalakkal	Raj B. Shetty, Gopalkrishna Deshpande, Chaithra J. Achar, Samyukta Hornad	Lighter Buddha Films	
S E P T E M B E R	1	Sapta Sagaradaache Ello: Side A	Hemant Rao	Rakshit Shetty, Rukmini Vasanth, Achyuth Kumar, Sharath Lohitashwa, Avinash, Pavitra Lokesh	Paramvah Studios	
S E P T E M B E R	8	Avalu Laila Alla Naanu Majnu Alla	Yallu Punyakoti	Ajay Kumar Togari, Ashwini Kattimani, Niharika Rao, Kari Subbu	RA Productions	
S E P T E M B E R	8	Kaddha Chitra	Suhas Krishna	Vijay Raghavendra, Namrata Surendranath, Raghu Shivamogga, Sujith Suprabha	Shanvi Talkies	
S E P T E M B E R	8	Paryaya	Ramananda Mitra	Santhosh, Jayanthi, Archana Shetty	Mamatha Creations	
S E P T E M B E R	15	13 Part-1	Narendra Babu	Raghavendra Rajkumar, Shruti, Pramod Shetty, Dilip Pai	UV Productions	
S E P T E M B E R	15	Parimala D'Souza	Giridhar H T	Komala Banavasee, Bhavya, Srinivas Prabhu	Village Road Films	
S E P T E M B E R	15	Tales of Mahanagara	Rajeev Kiran Vaneil	Atharv Vijay, Ramola Shimoga, Sampath Maitreya, RJ Anoopa	Atharv Pictures	
S E P T E M B E R	15	Tatsama Tadbhava	Vishal Atreya	Prajwal Devaraj, Meghana Raj, Aravinnd Iyer, T. S. Nagabharana, Balaji Manohar	PB Studios4; Anvit Cinemas	
S E P T E M B E R	22	Aaraariraaro	Sandeep Shetty	Prasanna V. Shetty, Niriksha Shetty, Veena Kamath, Jeeva Simon	TMT Productions	
S E P T E M B E R	22	Bun-Tea	Uday Kumar	Maurya, Tanmay, Umesh Sakkarenadu	Radhakrishna Pictures	
S E P T E M B E R	22	Digvijaya	Durga Prasad	Jayaprabhu Lingayat, Sneha Khatri, Suchendra Prasad, Honnavalli Krishna	J P Entertainment World	
S E P T E M B E R	22	Dvandva	Bharath Laxmikantha	Thilak Shekar, Asiya Firdose, Nayana Raj, Anitha Bhat, Bala Rajwadi	Common Man Productions	
S E P T E M B E R	22	Honeymoon in Bangkok	Sanjay B. S.	Uday Surya, Anu Gowda, Ananya Dey, Vijay Chandur, Preksha Rao	R S Productions	
S E P T E M B E R	22	Olave Mandara 2	S. R. Patil	Sanath, Prajna Bhat, Bhavya	Basava Combines	
S E P T E M B E R	22	Parishuddam	Karthik Venkatesh	Bhargav B. V., Archana Pillegowda, Sparsha Rekha, Rohan Kidiyoor, Neethu Shetty	Biruver Cine Creations	
S E P T E M B E R	28	Baanadariyalli	Preetham Gubbi	Ganesh, Reeshma Nanaiah, Rukmini Vasanth	Sri Vaare Talkies	
S E P T E M B E R	28	Chikku	S. U. Arun Kumar	Siddharth, Nimisha Sajayan, Anjali Nair, Sahasra Shree	Etaki Entertainment	
S E P T E M B E R	28	Thothapuri: Chapter 2	Vijaya Prasad	Jaggesh, Dhananjaya, Aditi Prabhudeva, Suman Ranganathan, H. G. Dattatreya, Veena Sundar	Suresh Arts Pvt. Limited	
S E P T E M B E R	28	Kranthi Veera	Aadath M. P.	Ajith Jayraj, Dr. Janvi Jyothi, Pramod Shetty, Victory Vasu, Joe Simon, Bhavani Prakash	Heeralal Movies, A B Networks, SKJ Productions, Druthi Creations, Hindusthan Productions, Unequeorn Studios London	

== October – December ==
Opening		Title	Director	Cast	Studio	Ref.
O C T O B E R	6	Aade Nam God	P. H. Vishwanath	Nataraj Bhat, Sarika Rao, Ajit Boppanalli, B. Suresha, Anoop Shoonya	BBR Films; Everest India Entertainers	
O C T O B E R	6	Abhiramachandra	Nagendra Ganiga	Ratha Kiran, Siddu Moolimani, Natya Ranga, Shivani Rai V, S. Narayan	AGS Productions	
O C T O B E R	6	Fighter	Nuthana Umesha	Vinod Prabhakar, Lekha Chandra, Paavana Gowda, Nirosha Radha	Akash Enterprises	
O C T O B E R	6	Love	Mahesha C Ammalidoddy	Prajay Jayram, Vrusha Patil, Radhika Bhat, Satish Kanthara	Sri Kaala Bhaireshwara Movie Makers	
O C T O B E R	6	Mr. and Mrs. Manmatha	A. Subramani	A. Subramani		
O C T O B E R	6	Raja Marthanda	K. Ram Narayan	Chiranjeevi Sarja, Deepti Sati, Meghashree, Saurav Lokesh, Chikkanna, Devaraj	Sri Madeshwara Productions	
O C T O B E R	12	Jalapata	S V Ramesh Begar	Rajneesh M, Nagashree Begar, Pramod Shetty, B L Ravikumar, Rekha Premkumar		
O C T O B E R	13	Kudru	Bhaskar Naik	Harshith Shetty, Priya Hegde, Godwin Sparkle, Farhan Udupi, Diana D'Souza	Moksha Creations	
O C T O B E R	13	Marakastra	Gurumurthy Sunami	Malashri, Ayyappa P Sharma, Harshika Poonacha, Ugramm Manju, Anand Aarya	NKS Shraavya Combines	
O C T O B E R	13	Vesha	Krishna Nadpal	Raghavendra Devadiga, Nidhi Maroli, Manju Pavagada, Jayaprakash Shetty	Hamsini Creations	
O C T O B E R	19	Ghost	M. G. Srinivas	Shiva Rajkumar, Anupam Kher, Jayaram, Prashant Narayanan, Archana Jois, H. G. Dattatreya, Satya Prakash	Sandesh Productions	
O C T O B E R	20	Premam 2Two	Vinay Ratnasiddhi	Vinay Ratnasiddhi, Vaishnavi Nagarathna, Shankuntala Dharigowda, Sushmitha Urvi, Kaveri Hadhadi	Ratnasiddhi Films	
O C T O B E R	27	Tagaru Palya	Umesha K. Krupa	Nagabhushana, Amrutha Prem, Tara, Sharath Lohithaswa, Rangayana Raghu, Vasuki Vaibhav, Chitra Shenoy, Vaijanath Biradar	Daali Pictures	
N O V E M B E R	3	Basrikatte	Vaibhav Gowda	Rahul Madhav, Ananya Kashyap, Ashwin Hassan, Bala Rajwadi	Geethanjali Films	
N O V E M B E R	3	Bhavapoorna	Chethan Mundadi	Atharva Prakash, Venya Rai, Ramesh Pandit, Manjunath Hegde	GL Motion Pictures	
N O V E M B E R	3	Crazy Keerthy	Balaji Madhavashetty	Abilash Dalapathy, Sarika Rao, Risha Gowda, Om Prakash Rao, Rangayana Raghu	Priya Balaji Productions	
N O V E M B E R	3	Cycle Savari	Devu K. Ambiga	Devu K. Ambiga, Deeksha Bhise		
N O V E M B E R	3	Garuda Purana	Manjunath B. Nagba	Manjunath B. Nagba, Santhosh Karki, Disha Shetty	27 Frames Creations	
N O V E M B E R	3	TRP Rama	Ravi Prasad	Ravi Prasad, Mahalakshmi, Pallavi Parva, Harish Arasu	Ashutosh Pictures	
N O V E M B E R	10	Garadi	Yogaraj Bhat	Yashas Surya, B.C. Patil, Sonal Monteiro, Darshan	Sowmya Films; Kourava Production House	
N O V E M B E R	10	Naa Kolikke Ranga	Goravale Mahesh	Master Anand, Rajeshwari, Bhavya, Shobhraj, Vaijanath Biradar, Honnavalli Krishna	The Maneleo Creations	
N O V E M B E R	10	Royal Mech	Nagabhooshan Janthagal; Jayadev Hassan	Danush Madhavan, Shravya Rao, Raghavendra Rajkumar, Vinaya Prasad	Shabari Films	
N O V E M B E R	10	Rudri	Badiger Devendra	Paavana Gowda, Sudha Prasanna, Sameer Nagarad, Dayanand sagar, Gurunath Chintamani	Ideaworks Motion Pictures	
N O V E M B E R	10	Vasanthakalada Hoogalu	Sachin Shetty	Sachin Rathod, Radha Bhagavathi, Ramesh Rai Kukkuvalli		
N O V E M B E R	17	Bembidada Naavika	Sriyaan Mysuru	Sriyaan Mysuru, Priyadarshini Krishna, Aishwarya Phaniraj, Bala Rajwadi	Sri Ambalpadi Mahakali Combines	
N O V E M B E R	17	Bhai	Manju Yaluvigi	Yuva 'Pooja Basavaraj', Lucky Ram, Sukanya, Prashanth	Bhagyashree Films	
N O V E M B E R	17	Nethram	Billur Suresh	Daksh Garag, Dhanashri Basava	Sri Jaya Surya Movies	
N O V E M B E R	17	Rajayoga	Lingaraj Uchchangi Durga	Dharmanna Kadur, Niriksha Rao, Nagendra Shah	Sri Ramarathna Productions	
N O V E M B E R	17	Sapta Saagaradaache Ello – Side B	Hemant Rao	Rakshit Shetty, Rukmini Vasanth, Chaithra J. Achar, Sharath Lohithaswa, Gopalkrishna Desai	Paramvah Studios	
N O V E M B E R	17	The Vacant House	Ester Noronha	Ester Noronha, Sundeep Malani, Shreyas Chinga, Seema Buthello	Janet Noronha Productions	
N O V E M B E R	24	Bad Manners	Duniya Suri	Abhishek Ambareesh, Rachita Ram, Sharath Lohithaswa, Kuri Prathap, Tara	Studio 18	
N O V E M B E R	24	Electronic City	Chikkanna Ramakrishnaiah	Aryan Harsha, Diya Ashlesh, Rakshitha Keremane, Bhavya Ruthwik	Chikkanna Ramakrishnaiah	
N O V E M B E R	24	Sugar Factory	Deepak Aras	Darling Krishna, Sonal Monteiro, Adhvithi Shetty, Ruhani Shetty, Rangayana Raghu	Balamani Productions	
N O V E M B E R	24	Swathi Mutthina Male Haniye	Raj B. Shetty	Raj B. Shetty, Siri Ravikumar, Balaji Manohar	AppleBox Studios; Lighter Buddha Films	
D E C E M B E R	1	Anavarana	Harish Kumar B. K.	Arjun Yogi, Sarika Rao, Gaurish Akki, Nandagopal	Namma Cinema Movie Makers	
D E C E M B E R	1	Ardhambardha Premakathe	Aravind Kaushik	Aravind KP, Divya Uruduga, Suraj Hoogar, Shreya Babu, Abhilash Dwarkish	Bukus Media	
D E C E M B E R	1	Garudiga	P. Vidha Raghav	Rudwin Vir, Manasa Gowda, Archana Pillegowda, Sonu Rakshi	MV Films	
D E C E M B E R	1	Ranchi	Shashikant Gatti	Prabhu Mundkur, Tota Roy Chowdhury, Divya Uruduga, Suresh Heblikar	Rudra Films; Girija Talkies; Shashikant Motion Pictures PVT LTD	
D E C E M B E R	1	Shoshite	Sasidhar Reddy	Jhanvi Rayala, Roopa Rayappa, Prashanthkumar Ramaswamy	Nature View Outdoor Carnival Productions	
D E C E M B E R	7	Athi I Love You	Lokendra Surya	Lokendra Surya, Shravya Rao	Seven Raj Arts	
D E C E M B E R	8	Kaiva	Jayatheertha	Dhanveerah, Megha Shetty, Jayaram Karthik, Dinakar Thoogudeepa	Abhuvanasa Creations	
D E C E M B E R	8	Marichi	Siddhruv Siddhu	Vijay Raghavendra, Sonu Gowda, Abhi Das, Sruthi Patil	SS REC Productions	
D E C E M B E R	8	Politics Kalyana	Kavi Rajesh	Pankaj Narayan, Sasya Kanchu, V. Manohar, Nischitha Shetty	Ganesh Creations	
D E C E M B E R	14	Sneharshi	Kiran Narayan	Kiran Narayan, Sanjana Burli, Sudha Belawadi	Sri Lakshmi Beteraya Combines	
D E C E M B E R	15	Aa Rahasya	Mandya Nagaraj	Thriller Manju, Anushree		
D E C E M B E R	15	December 16	Madhusudhan Havaldar	Umesh Banakar, Rishi, Jackie Shroff, Saikumar	Nagarjuna Cine Creations	
D E C E M B E R	15	Halli Mukka	B. Manju	Guru Prasad, Varnika Gowda	Sri Dandina Durgadevi Cine Movies	
D E C E M B E R	15	Mayanagari	Shankar Aradhya	Anish Tejeshwar, Teju, Shravya Rao, Dwarakish, Chikkanna	Sandalwood Pictures	
D E C E M B E R	15	O Nanna Chethana	Apurva	Prathick Manjunath, Preetham Manjunath, Shaurya Deepak, Dimpana Jeevankumar, Daneshwari Surangi	S. S. Enterprises	
D E C E M B E R	15	Useless Fellow	Manu Basavaraj	Manu Basavaraj, Vijay Suriya, Divya Gowda, Vinod Gobbaragaala	Rajarathna Productions	
D E C E M B E R	29	Athma Thallana	SP Krishna Kyathmarnalli	Adikesavalu Reddy		
D E C E M B E R	29	Kaatera	Tharun Sudhir	Darshan, Aradhana Ram, Jagapati Babu, Vijanath Biradar, Shruti	Rockline Productions	
