= Santhosh Venky =

Indian playback singer

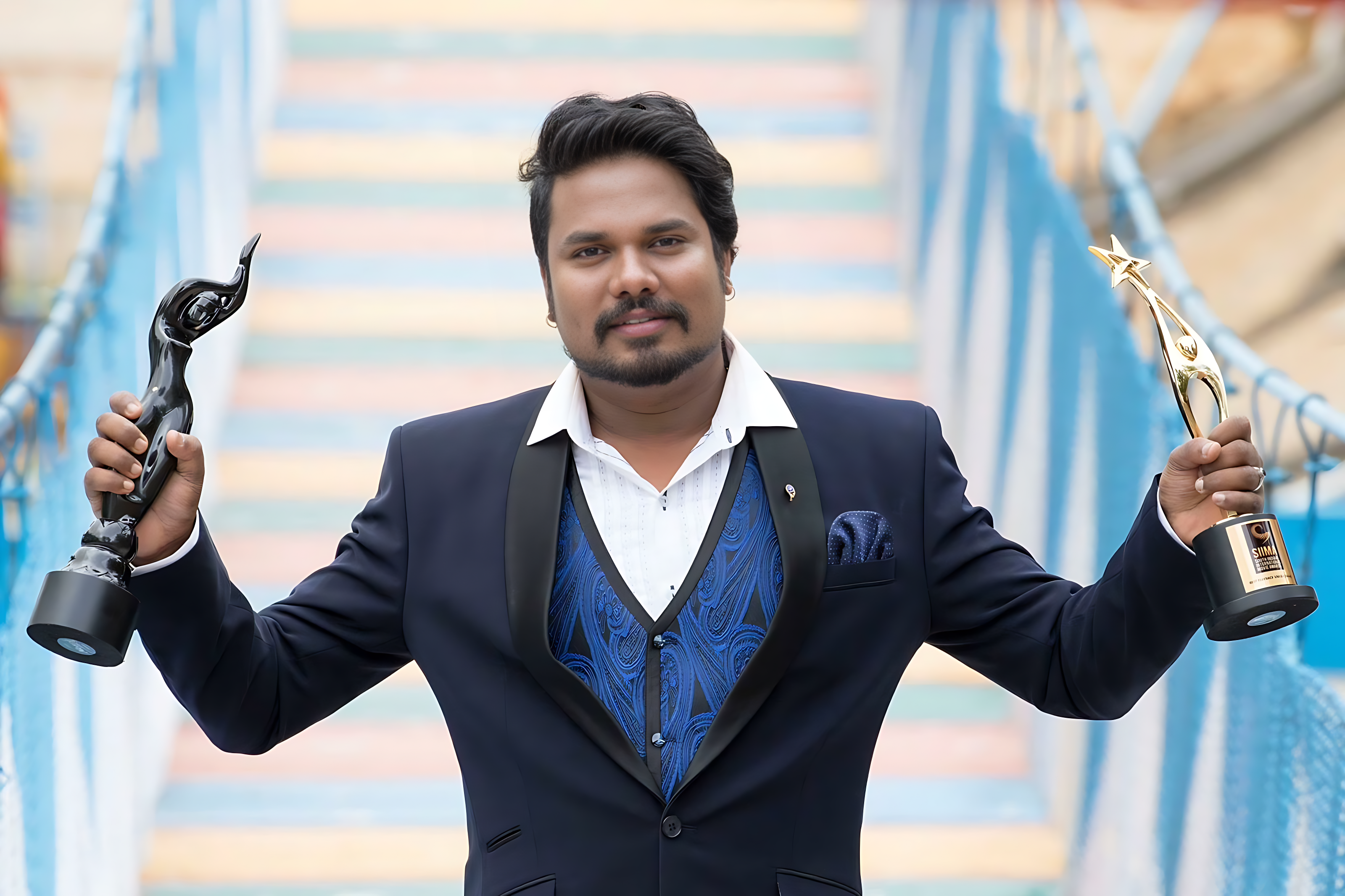
- Born: Cinganamala Venkata Rama Santosh; 14th April; Bangalore, India
- Occupation: Playback singer
- Awards: Karnataka State Film Awards; Filmfare Awards South SIIMA Awards

Santhosh Venky is an Indian playback singer known for his work in Kannada cinema. He has performed for many Kannada film songs. Starting his singing career from the film Krishnan Marriage Story in 2011, Santhosh Venky recorded for many film songs and won Karnataka State Film Awards and Filmfare Awards South for his singing.

== Filmography ==
Year	Film	Song	Composer(s)	Writer(s)	Co-singer(s)	Ref.
2011	Bete	Cheluva Sanjeyolage"	Akhil G.		Sneha Nannival	
2015	Aatagara	"Tharamayya"	Anoop Seelin	Rohit Padaki	Supriya Lohith	
2015	Preethiyalli Sahaja	Sundarangiye	Raviraj			
2015	Rhaatee	Devaru Illada"	V. Harikrishna	A. P. Arjun		
2015	Rhaatee	Ratti Patta"	V. Harikrishna	A. P. Arjun	Vani Harikrishna	
2015	Rhaatee	"Raja Rani (male)"	V. Harikrishna	A. P. Arjun		
2016	Jai Maruthi 800	Mandhara	Arjun Janya			
2018	K.G.F: Chapter 1	"Salaam Rocky Bhai"	Ravi Basrur	Dr. V. Nagendra Prasad	Vijay Prakash, Sachin Basrur, Puneeth Rudranag, Mohan, Shreenevas Moorthi, Vijay Urs	
2018	K.G.F: Chapter 1	"Dheera Dheera"	Ravi Basrur	Ravi Basrur	Ananya Bhat, Sachin Basrur, Puneeth Rudranag, Mohan Krishna, Shreenevas Moorthi, Vijay Urs	
2018	K.G.F: Chapter 1	"Sidila Bharava"	Ravi Basrur	Ravi Basrur	Ananya Bhat, Santhosh Venky, Sachin Basrur, Puneeth Rudranag, Mohan H, Shreenevas Moorthi, Vijay Urs	
2019	Yajamana	Shivanandi	V. Harikrishna	Chethankumar		
2019	Odeya	Malavalli Maavana Magane"	Arjun Janya	Kaviraj	Kailash Kher, Sony Komanduri	
2019	Kiss	Kanna Neeridu"	V. Harikrishna			
2021	Antim: The Final Truth	Koi Toh Aayega"	Ravi Basrur	Shabbir Ahmed Ravi Basrur	Ravi Basrur, Mohan Krishna, Sachin Basrur, Puneeth Rudranag, Vyasaraj Sosale, Chethan Handattu, Krishna Basrur, Nagaprakash Kota, Vijay Basrur, Umesh Karkada, Krishnamurthy Basrur, Nanndhu J K.G.F, Ramakrishna Basrur	
2021	Madhagaja	Dwaparake Sri Krishna"	Ravi Basrur	Ravi Basrur		
2021	Madhagaja	"Madhagaja Title Song"	Ravi Basrur	Kinnal Raj		
2021	Madhagaja	"Nagutha Thayi"	Ravi Basrur	Kinnal Raj		
2022	Nam Annayya					
2022	Etharkkum Thunindhavan (D)	Eru Eru"	D. Imman	Kinnal Raj		
2022	Etharkkum Thunindhavan (D)	Silk Wala Kurta"	D. Imman	Raqueeb Alam	Rita	
2022	Etharkkum Thunindhavan (D)	"Bole Wahi"	D. Imman	Raqueeb Alam		
2022	K.G.F: Chapter 2	Sulthana"	Ravi Basrur		Mohan Krishna, Sachin Basrur, Ravi Basrur, Puneeth Rudranag, Manish Dinakar, Varsha Acharya	
2022	K.G.F: Chapter 2	Toofan"	Ravi Basrur		Mohan Krishna, Sachin Basrur, Ravi Basrur, Puneeth Rudranag, Varsha Acharya, Giridhar Kamath, Raksha Kamath, Sinchana Kamath, Nishanth Kini, Bharath Bhat, Anagha Nayak, Avani Bhat, Swathi Kamath, Shivanand Nayak, Keerthana Basrur	
2022	Liger					
2023	Kabzaa	Chum Chum Chali Chali"	Ravi Basrur	Pramod Maravante	Aira Udupi, Manish Dinakar,	
2023	Kabzaa	Kabzaa Title Track"	Ravi Basrur	Ravi Basrur	Bhavyashri Bandimata, Ravi Basrur, Sachin Basrur, Manish Dinakar	
2023	Kisi Ka Bhai Kisi Ki Jaan	Bathukamma"	Ravi Basrur	Shabbir Ahmed, Ravi Basrur, Kinnal Raj, Harini Ivaturi	Aira Udupi, Harini Ivaturi, Sucheta Basrur, Vijaylaxmi Mettinahole	
2023	Kisi Ka Bhai Kisi Ki Jaan	Kisi Ka Bhai Kisi Ki Jaan - Theme	Ravi Basrur	Ravi Basrur	Ravi Basrur, Sachin Basrur, Manish Dinakar	
2023	Abhiramachandra	Soul of Abhi"	Ravi Basrur	Simple Suni		
2023	Skanda (D)		S. Thaman			
2023	Kshetrapathi					
2023	Chitram Choodara					
2023	Iravan		S Pradeep Varma			
2023	Salaar: Part 1 – Ceasefire (D)	Arivaai	Ravi Basrur	Madhurakavi		
2024	Bhimaa	Galli Soundullo	Ravi Basrur			
2024	Bhimaa	"The Rage of Bhimaa	Ravi Basrur			
2024	Vanchana		Vijetha Krishna			
2024	Singham Again	Singham Again – Title Track"	Ravi Basrur	Swanand Kirkire		
2024	Singham Again	"Lady Singham"	Ravi Basrur	Kumaar		
2024	Bhairathi Ranagal	Bhairathi Ranagal Title Song"	Ravi Basrur	Kinnal Raj		
2024	Kanguva (D)	"Kanga Kanguva"	Devi Sri Prasad	Varadaraj Chikkaballapura		
2024	Devara: Part 1	"Ayudha Pooja" (Dubbed version)	Devi Sri Prasad	Varadaraj Chikkaballapura		
2024	Devara: Part 1	"Fear Song"	Devi Sri Prasad	Varadaraj Chikkaballapura		
2024	Devara: Part 1	"Fear Song"	Devi Sri Prasad	Mankombu Gopalakrishnan		
2024	Pushpa 2: The Rule (D)	"Peelings"	Devi Sri Prasad	Varadaraj Chikkaballapura	Amala Chebolu	
2024	Zebra	"Teri Meri"	Ravi Basrur	Purna Chary	Vijayalaxmi Mettinahole	
2024	Zebra	"Tere Bina"	Ravi Basrur	Krishna Kanth	Airaa Udupi	
2024	Zebra	"Gaaya Laina"	Ravi Basrur	Purna Chary		
2024	Marco	"Asuran"	Ravi Basrur	Vinayak Sasikumar		
2024	Marco	"Marco Theme 1"	Ravi Basrur			
2024	Marco	Blood"	Ravi Basrur	Vinayak Sasikumar	Dabzee, Rohith Siddappa	
2024	Marco	Blood" (Version 2)	Ravi Basrur	Vinayak Sasikumar	Rohith Siddappa	
2025	Shanmukha	Oo Chandrakala"	Ravi Basrur	Santhosh Venky		
2025	Shanmukha	"Title Track"	Ravi Basrur	Santhosh Venky		
2025	Dilmaar	Naan Yaaro"	Ravi Basrur	Radhan	M Chandramouli	
2025	Junior	Update Aagbeku"	Devi Sri Prasad	Pavan Bhat		
2025	Junior	"Helo Devane"	Devi Sri Prasad	Pavan Bhat		
2026	Kattalan	Blood On Tusk" Ravi Basrur	Chethan Handattu	Rohith Sidappa, Siddharth Basrur, chorus		

== Awards ==
=== State Awards ===
- 2015 – Karnataka State Film Award for Best Male Playback Singer – "Sundarangiye" (Preethiyalli Sahaja)

=== Filmfare Awards ===
- 2015 – Filmfare Award for Best Male Playback Singer – Kannada – "Raja Raniyanthe" (Rhaatee)
- 2016 - Nominated - "Mandara Mandara" ("Jai Maruthi 800")

=== SIIMA Awards ===
- 2015 – SIIMA Award for Best Male Playback Singer – "Raja Raniyanthe" (Rhaatee)
- 2018 – SIIMA Award for Best Male Playback Singer – "Salaam Rocky bhai" (K.G.F: Chapter 1)
- 2019 – SIIMA Award for Best Male Playback Singer – "Shivanandi" (Yajamana)
- 2023 - SIIMA Award nominated for– "Sulthana" from KGF: Chapter 2

=== Mirchi Music Awards ===
- 2015 – MirchiMusicAwardsSouth Male Vocalist of the year – "Raja Raniyanthe" (Rhaatee)
