= Ayogya 2 =

- Directed by: S. Mahesh Kumar
- Written by: S. Mahesh Kumar
- Screenplay by: Suresh Armugam
- Story by: S. Mahesh Kumar
- Produced by: M. Munegowda
- Starring: Sathish Ninasam; Rachita Ram; P. Ravishankar; Sadhu Kokila
- Cinematography: Vishwajith Rao
- Edited by: Suresh Armugam
- Music by: Arjun Janya
- Production company: SVC Films
- Distributed by: KVN Productions
- Release date: August 7, 2026 (Bengaluru)yes
- Running time: 152 mins
- Country: India
- Language: Kannada

Ayogya 2 is a 2026 Indian Kannada-language action comedy film written and directed by S. Mahesh Kumar. Produced by M. Munegowda under the SVC Films production, the film's distribution rights is acquired by KVN Productions. The film is a sequel to Kumar's 2018 film, Ayogya which reprises most of the cast including Sathish Ninasam, Rachita Ram, P. Ravishankar, Sadhu Kokila, Shivaraj K. R. Pete, Aruna Balraj and Tabla Nani. Actors V. Ravichandran and Devaraj have made special appearances. The film's music is composed by Arjun Janya, while the cinematography is by Vishwajith Rao.

The film, based on a rural theme, was shot in and around Mandya district in Karnataka. It was released on 7 August 2026 across Karnataka, and received average reviews from critics.

== Cast ==
- Sathish Ninasam as Siddhegowda "Siddha"
- Rachita Ram as Nandini
- P. Ravishankar as Bachhegowda
- Tabla Nani as Holge
- Sadhu Kokila as Bhairathi Gundkal alias Ragi Bhai
- Aruna Balraj as Bhagyamma
- Sundar Raj as Marriage Broker Shamanna
- Girish Shivanna as Benne
- Shivaraj K. R. Pete as Mutton
- Manju Pavagada
- V. Ravichandran in a special appearance
- Devaraj in a special appearance

== Soundtrack ==
Ayogya 2

Soundtrack album by Arjun Janya
- Released: 13 July 2026
- Recorded: 2026
- Genre: Film soundtrack
- Language: Kannada
- Label: Anand Audio
- Producer: Arjun Janya

Arjun Janya composed the soundtrack and score for the film.

Tracklist
No.	Title	Lyrics	Singer(s)	Length
1.	"Mudd Muddu Putlakshmi"	Chethan Kumar	Sid Sriram, Prithwi Bhat
2.	"Anna Bandre"	Chethan Kumar	Anthony Daasan
3.	"Hudugir"	Chethan Kumar	Vijay Prakash
4.	"Milky Beauty"	Chethan Kumar	Indu Nagaraj, Nishan Rai

== Reception ==
A. Sharadhaa rated the film 3.5 out of 5 stars reviewing the film for The New Indian Express as "technically, Ayogya 2 remains rooted in the world established by its predecessor". Susmita Sameera, a reviewer of Times Of India, rated 2.5 out of 5 stars and reviewed that the film is "A Formulaic Sequel That Falls Short of Its Potential".
