= Naveen Shankar =

Indian film actor

- Born: Naveen Shankar; 25 May 1988 (age 37); Ilkal, Bagalkot, Karnataka
- Occupations: Actor; TV presenter
- Years active: 2009–present

Naveen Shankar (born 25 May 1988) is an Indian actor who has worked predominantly in Kannada cinema. Naveen made his feature film debut with Gultoo in 2018. He is known for his performance in Hondisi Bareyiri, Gurudev Hoysala and Salaar: Part 1 – Ceasefire.

== Early life ==
Naveen Shankar was born on 25 May 1988 in Ilkal, Bagalkot, Karnataka.

== Career ==
Shankar began working as a film journalist for a local news channel after dropping out from engineering studies in 2009. In 2012 he joined the U2 Music channel as an anchor. Around this time, he began acting in theatre, performing in more than 45 plays and approximately 200 street performances, while working for various theatre production houses.

In 2018 Shankar made his acting debut in Janardhan Chikkanna's cybercrime thriller Gultoo. The movie opened to positive reviews and Naveen's acting performance was praised.

He then took his time to sign his next film. Finally, Shankar was cast as lead actor for the role of an MMA boxer in the crime drama film Dharani Mandala Madhyadolage. The film's title is inspired from the folk song "Punyakoti". The film was launched in 2019 but completed shooting in 2021 after long delays and released in November 2022. The film opened to positive to mixed reviews, however his acting was praised. In 2023, he had four films starting with Hondisi Bareyiri which opened to positive reviews, Shankar received praise from critics and audience for his role. He was then seen playing antagonist role in the movie Gurudev Hoysala. His performance was once again appreciated along with the film, but the film ended as an average farer at the box office. His net was Kshetrapathi alongside Archana Jois directed by Debutant Srikanth where he portrayed a young Graduate fighting the system, though the film received mixed reviews, his performance was once again appreciated. He then ended his year with the Prashant Neel directorial Salaar which also marked his Telugu debut.

In June 2023 KRG Studios announced Kirket 11 with Naveen and Danish Sait. Directed by Suman Kumar, who co-wrote The Family Man and Farzi.

== Filmography ==
Key
†	Denotes film or TV productions that have not yet been released

- All films are in Kannada language, unless otherwise noted

Year	Film	Role	Notes	Ref.
2012	Rambo	Henchman	Uncredited	
2018	Gultoo	Alok	Lead debut	
2022	Dharani Mandala Madhyadolage	Aadhi	Filmfare Critics Award for Best Actor – Kannada	
2023	Hondisi Bareyiri	Ranjit		
2023	Gurudev Hoysala	Bali		
2023	Kshetrapati	Basavaraj Hadimani		
2023	Salaar: Part 1 – Ceasefire	Pandith	Telugu film	
2025	Nodidavaru Enanthare	Siddharth		
2025	Kiriket 11†	TBA	Pre Production	
2025	Moolathaha Nammavare†	TBA	Completed	
