= Ayogya =

Ayogya (lit. 'incapable') may refer to these Indian films:

- Ayogya (2018 film), Kannada-language film
- Ayogya (2019 film), Tamil-language action film
