= Agnyathavasi (2025 film) =

2025 Indian Kannada-language crime drama film

- Theatrical release poster
- Directed by: Janardhan Chikkanna
- Written by: Krishna Raj
- Produced by: Hemanth M. Rao; Prachura P. P.; Jayalakshmi
- Starring: Rangayana Raghu; Paavana Gowda; Siddu Moolimani; Sharath Lohitashwa; Ravishankar Gowda
- Cinematography: Advaitha Gurumurthy
- Edited by: Bharath MC
- Music by: Charan Raj
- Production company: Dakshayini Talkies
- Release date: 11 April 2025
- Running time: 122 minutes
- Country: India
- Language: Kannada

Agnyathavasi (lit. 'One in exile') is a 2025 Indian Kannada-language crime drama mystery film written by Krishna Raj and directed by Janardhan Chikkanna. Produced by Hemanth M. Rao, Prachura P. P., and Jayalakshmi under the banner of Dakshayini Talkies, the film stars Rangayana Raghu, Paavana Gowda, Siddu Moolimani, Sharath Lohitashwa, and Ravishankar Gowda. Set in the Malenadu region of Karnataka in the late 1990s, the film explores themes of guilt, forgiveness, and hidden truths through a rural murder mystery. Cinematography was by Advaitha Gurumurthy, with music by Charan Raj and editing by Bharath MC.

The film was released theatrically on 11 April 2025 and received generally positive reviews for its performances, atmosphere, and technical aspects, though some critics noted a weak climax.

== Plot ==
In the village of Nalkeri, Malenadu, during the late 1990s, Inspector Govindu (Rangayana Raghu), a police officer and farmer, leads a quiet life where the local police station is largely idle. The mysterious death of landlord Srinivasaiah (Sharath Lohitashwa) is declared a murder by Govindu, surprising the crime-free village. His investigation uncovers ties to a 1970s unresolved case, exposing hidden secrets. The story follows Rohit (Siddu Moolimani), who introduces the village’s first computer, and Pankaja (Paavana Gowda), linked to Srinivasaiah’s estranged son, Arun. A second death deepens the mystery, exploring guilt and silence in a ritualistic narrative set against the village’s eerie calm.

== Cast ==
- Rangayana Raghu as Inspector Govindu, a rural police officer and farmer
- Paavana Gowda as Pankaja, a young woman linked to the landlord’s family
- Siddu Moolimani as Rohit, a tech-savvy villager
- Sharath Lohitashwa as Srinivasaiah, a prominent landlord
- Ravishankar Gowda as Ananthu, a pragmatic investigator
- Yamuna Srinidhi as a local mason
- Hari Samashti as Constable Kumara

== Production ==
=== Development ===
In March 2022, Janardhan Chikkanna, director of Gultoo (2018), announced a murder mystery produced by Hemanth M Rao under Dakshayini Talkies, named after Rao’s mother. Inspired by a 1997 Malenadu murder, the film was written by Krishna Raj. The title Agnyathavasi was revealed on 18 April 2022.

=== Casting ===
Rangayana Raghu was cast as the lead, chosen for his role in Cyanide (2006), with Paavana Gowda, Siddu Moolimani, Sharath Lohitashwa, and Ravishankar Gowda in key roles. Yamuna Srinidhi and Hari Samashti play supporting parts. Chikkanna and Rao highlighted Raghu’s versatility.

=== Filming ===
Filming began on 20 April 2022 in Chikmagalur and Madikeri, capturing Malenadu’s landscape. The 1990s setting featured period-specific design by Ullas Hydur, including early computer packaging. Cinematographer Advaitha Gurumurthy emphasized the region’s misty forests. Shooting wrapped by early 2023.

== Music ==
Charan Raj, known for Sapta Sagaradaache Ello, composed the score and soundtrack. The background score enhanced suspense, and the song “Naguvina Nesara” was noted for emotional impact.

== Release ==
Agnyathavasi was released theatrically on 11 April 2025 after delays to secure post-theatrical rights. The teaser was unveiled on 7 April 2023, and the trailer on 4 April 2025. It began streaming on ZEE5 on 16 May 2025, with television rights acquired by Zee Kannada.

== Reception ==
Critics generally praised Agnyathavasi for its performances, cinematography, and atmosphere, though some criticized the climax. Vivek M V of The Hindu called it a “moody thriller” led by Rangayana Raghu but noted a lack of emotional resonance in the final act. A Sharadhaa of The New Indian Express described it as a “meditation on silence, mystery, and unspoken truths,” praising Raghu and Gurumurthy’s cinematography. Subha J Rao of The News Minute found it satisfying despite slow pacing.Sridevi S of The Times of India rated it 3.5/5, commending the cast’s restraint and 1990s nostalgia but finding the reveal predictable. Pratibha Joy of OTTplay gave it 2.5/5, noting positives but a lack of grip. Praniti A S of Deccan Herald argued style overshadowed substance. Swaroop Kodur of Hollywood Reporter India noted pacing issues. Avinash Ramachandran of Indian Express praised its “complex simplicity.” Sanjay Ponnapa of India Today called it a “slow and steady thriller.” Y Maheshwara Reddy of Bangalore Mirror described it as a “gripping tale of murder.”
