= Anjada Gandu (2014 film) =

- Film poster
- Directed by: Pradeep Raj
- Written by: Ezhil
- Screenplay by: Pradeep Raj
- Based on: Manam Kothi Paravai (Tamil) by S. Ezhil
- Produced by: Sharath Kumar; Pradeep Raj
- Starring: Sathish Ninasam; Subiksha; T. S. Nagabharana; Suman
- Cinematography: Ramesh Chakravarthy
- Edited by: Solomon; Vinod Manohar
- Music by: D. Imman
- Production companies: Indrajala Movies; Sharath Combines
- Distributed by: B Vottige Pictures
- Release date: 31 January 2014
- Running time: 134 minutes
- Country: India
- Language: Kannada

Anjada Gandu (Kannada: ಅಂಜದ ಗಂಡು) is a 2014 Indian Kannada romantic comedy film directed by Pradeep Raj, and starring Sathish Ninasam and debutant actress Subiksha in lead roles. A remake of the 2012 Tamil film, Manam Kothi Paravai, Anjada Gandu is Sathish Neenasam's first commercial film as a solo hero, and was released 31 January 2014.

== Plot ==
Young Santhu (Satish Neenasam) assists his father (T.S. Nagabharana) in construction work, and is in love with his neighbour Geetha (Subiksha). Unfortunately, Geetha's father (Suman) and uncles are the village's biggest bullies. When Santhu reveals his love to Geetha, he is shocked to find that a planned marriage for Geetha had been arranged for her by her father.

Santhu's friends kidnap Geetha to prevent the union, and when ultimately Geetha and Santhu are caught together, her father and uncles give Santhu a beating and he is chased from the village. Returning two years later, Santhu discovers that Geetha has not married. Still in love, he goes to her house and pleads with her to marry him. Her father catches the two together and demands he leave, but this time with Geetha.

== Cast ==
- Sathish Ninasam as Santhu
- Subiksha as Geetha Gowda
- Suman as Bette Gowda
- T. S. Nagabharana as Santhu's father
- Raju Talikote
- Chikkanna
- Honnavalli Krishna

== Production ==
To lend a rural backdrop to the film, major portions of the film were shot in Karnataka, India in the Mandya and Kodagu districts, as well as in Mysore and Bangalore. Production cast Sathish based upon his work in drama film projects. This was Subhiksha's first Kannada project, marking her Sandalwood debut. The film's title is taken from the original Anjada Gandu film, which released in 1988. Reported in July 2013 as nearing completion, the project was completed with no delays, entered post production during October 2013, and had its audio launch during November 2013.

== Soundtrack ==
Anjada Gandu

Soundtrack album by D. Imman
- Released: 2014
- Genre: Feature film soundtrack
- Label: Anand Audio

D. Imman chronology
Jilla (2014)	Anjada Gandu (2014)	Ninaivil Nindraval (2015)

The film's soundtrack was released by Anand Audio. Lyricists were K. Kalyan, Sathish Ninasam, and V. Nagendra Prasad. Playback singers were Akanksha Badami, Anuradha Bhat, Nakul Jaidev, Rajesh Krishnan, Santhosh, Sathish Ninasam, and Vijay Prakash. The film's music is from D. Imman's original work on Manam Kothi Paravai, as remake rights to the music were sold for use in Anjada Gandu by MKP's production.

Track listing
No.	Title	Lyrics	Singer(s)	Length
1.	"Dang Dang"	V. Nagendra Prasad; K. Kalyan	Santhosh, Akanksha
2.	"Olagolagenu"	K. Kalyan	Nakul
3.	"Hogele"	K. Kalyan	Rajesh Krishnan
4.	"Anjada Gandu"	Sathish Ninasam	Ajay Warrier, Anuradha Bhat
5.	"Anjada Gandu"	Sathish Ninasam	Sathish Ninasam, Anuradha Bhat
6.	"Matthe Matthe"	K. Kalyan	Vijay Prakash, Anuradha Bhat

== Reception ==
Book My Show gave the film a rating of 73%, and One India's 'Filmibeat' gave it 3 out of 5 stars and generally praised the film, noting that in her debutant role of Geetha, Subhiksha "performed her role as an innocent village girl beautifully", and "Neenasam Sathish, who had already caught the attention of the moviegoers as a typical village guy even before Lucia, is mind blowing in his acting". They appreciated the comedic timing of Chikkanna and Raju Taalikote, writing that the film's question of whether or not Geetha's family should take revenge on Santhu "forms the crux of the story, which should be enjoyed on silver screen."

Times of India was perplexed as to why director Pradeep Raj recycled an old film theme with only cosmetic touches. They praised actor Satish Neenasam for his ability to deliver a decent Kannada dialect but, because his dialogue was occasionally too fast and not comprehensible, it was felt he needed to improve his expression. They also felt that Subhiksha could have done a better job in her role of Geetha. The music of D Imam was given good marks.

Bangalore Mirror gave the film 2.5 stars. Though the film was intended to be a romantic comedy, they felt the comedy was only in the dialogue, writing "The film starts as a comedy (mostly aided by the dialogues) and then turns to a drama and ends with the usual sentiment saga". Actor Chikkanna was praised for his carrying comedy moments with "his rustic mannerisms and dialogues", but "Too many incidents are packed into the narrative, and it slows down the pace." They felt it was "entertaining enough", but that it would have benefited from directorial finesse. It was concluded that the film "is not a compulsive watch, but it has its endearing moments."

Sify concluded their review of plot and acting by writing, "Seems like remakes work better for Pradeep Raj who is happy with his comeback. Though the music is just an average element, the movie as a package is quite entertaining and worth a watch for once."
