= Aghori (disambiguation) =

The Aghori are a Hindu monastic order.

Aghori may also refer to:

- Aghori, 2021 album by Kool Savas
- Aghori (Tamil-language film), 2023 Indian Tamil-language film
- Aghori (TV series), 2019 Indian Hindi-language series
