= Rocket (film) =

- Film poster
- Directed by: Shiva Shashi
- Written by: Shiva Shashi; Maasthi Upparahalli
- Produced by: Sathish Ninasam
- Starring: Sathish Ninasam; Aishani Shetty
- Cinematography: Advaitha Gurumurthy
- Edited by: Akshay P. Rao
- Music by: Poornachandra Tejaswi
- Production company: Sathish Picture house
- Release date: 27 November 2015
- Running time: 135 minutes
- Country: India
- Language: Kannada

Rocket (Kannada: ರಾಕೆಟ್) is a 2015 Kannada romantic comedy film written and directed by Shiva Shashi, produced by and co-starring Sathish Ninasam, alongside Aishani Shetty in the lead roles. Achyuth Kumar, Sundar Raj, Padmaja Rao, Ninasam Ashwath and Rajshri Ponnappa feature in supporting roles.

== Plot ==
The movie is a romantic comedy. The main lead of the movie, Rakesh (Sathish Ninasam), falls in love with Shwetha (Aishani Shetty), and goes through a romantic journey. He faces a lot of hurdles in the journey and overcomes those hurdles forms the crux of the story.

== Cast ==
- Sathish Ninasam as Rakesh
- Aishani Shetty as Shweta
- Rajshri Ponnappa
- Achyuth Kumar
- Sundar Raj
- Nagendra Sha
- Padmaja Rao
- Ninasam Ashwath
- Ashwini Gowda
- Mahanthesh Ramadurga
- Vinay Gowda

== Production ==
The shooting of the movie commenced in December 2014 and finished in July 2015. The movie has been shot in Bangalore and some locations of Coorg.

== Soundtrack ==
The music of the movie has been composed by Poornachandra Tejaswi of Lucia fame. The movie has five songs, one of the which has been sung by Kannada film actor Puneeth Rajkumar. Apart from known voices it also has voices from a pool of new Kannada singers.

Rocket (soundtrack)

Studio album by Poornachandra Tejasvi
- Released: 2015
- Genre: Feature film soundtrack
- Label: Anand Audio

Tracklist
No.	Title	Lyrics	Singer(s)	Length
1.	"Thannage Idvi"	Hariparak	Puneeth Rajkumar, Henry, Aishani Shetty	03:58
2.	"Hogabaarade Jeeva"	Arasu Anthare	Udit Haritas, Ananya Bhat	04:19
3.	"Idu Yaatharada"	Sathish Ninasam	Prajwal Jain, Anuradha Bhat	04:56
4.	"Naanu Yaaru"	Poornachandra Tejasvi	Chandan Shetty, Bappi Blossom	04:45
5.	"Rangi Rangi"	Poornachandra Tejasvi	Sathish Ninasam, Ramya H.R, Prithvi	04:28
