= O (2022 film) =

2022 Indian horror thriller film

- Theatrical release poster
- Directed by: Mahesha C. Ammalidoddy
- Written by: Mahesha C. Ammalidoddy (Dialogues)
- Screenplay by: Mahesha C. Ammalidoddy
- Story by: Kiran T. G.
- Produced by: Kiran T. G.
- Starring: Milana Nagaraj; Amrutha Iyengar; Siddu Moolimani
- Cinematography: Dilip Chakravarthy
- Edited by: Srikant
- Music by: Songs: Kiran Ravindranath; Score: Satish Babu
- Production company: Ekaakshara Films
- Distributed by: Jayanna Films
- Release date: 11 November 2022
- Country: India
- Language: Kannada

O is a 2022 Indian Kannada-language horror thriller film written and directed by Mahesha C. Ammalidoddy. The story of the film is written by Kiran T. G., who also produced the film under the banner Ekaakshara Films. The film stars Milana Nagaraj, Amrutha Iyengar, and Siddu Moolimani with Suchendra Prasad, Sangeetha Anil, Ramesh Pandith, and Vinay Krishnaswamy in supporting roles.

The film was released theatrically on 11 November 2022.

== Cast ==
- Milana Nagaraj as Nikitha
- Amrutha Iyengar as Nisha
- Siddu Moolimani as Chethan
- Suchendra Prasad
- Sangeetha Anil
- Ramesh Pandith
- Vinay Krishnaswamy
- Alaap

== Production ==
Milana Nagaraj and Amrutha Iyengar, who previously collaborated in Love Mocktail (2020), collaborate again in this film as sisters. In March 2019, it was announced that Milana had completed filming fifty percent of her schedule.

== Soundtrack ==
The songs of the film were composed by Kiran Ravindranath, and the background score was by Satish Babu. The song "Yeno Ondhu Jaadhu" was sung by Puneeth Rajkumar.

Track listing
No.	Title	Lyrics	Singer(s)	Length
1.	"Yeno Ondhu Jaadhu"	Chethan Kumar	Puneeth Rajkumar, Anuradha Bhat	3:14
2.	"Aa Modavu Karagalu"	Hrudayashiva	Vijay Prakash	4:36
3.	"Ee Vismaya"	Jayanth Kaikini	Sanjith Hegde, Anuradha Bhat	4:00
4.	"Hetthavara Mundhae"	Mahesha C. Ammalidoddy	R. P. Patnaik	3:37
5.	"O Remix Title Song"	—	Saicharan Bhaskaruni, Harini, Lokesh, Tejaswini	1:33
Total length:				17:00

== Reception ==
A critic from The Times of India gave the film three out of five stars and wrote, "Director Mahesh has tried to dish out a thriller drama with a simple storyline, blended with gripping narration. However, he succeeds in parts." A Sharadhaa of Cinema Express gave it two-and-a-half out of five stars and wrote, "O is a novel attempt that does leave a few aspects unanswered, but if you are a fan of the horror and suspense genre, this one is perfect for you."

Swaroop Kodur of OTTplay gave it two out of five stars and wrote, "O is not the most innovative horror film out there and nor is it original in its conception. The film, like many of its kind, depends heavily on post-production and less on a solid script which eventually becomes its undoing." Y. Maheswara Reddy of Bangalore Mirror rated the film three out of five stars and wrote that "O is worth a watch for those who get their thrills from horror."
