= Vaastu Prakaara =

- Film poster
- Directed by: Yogaraj Bhat
- Written by: Yogaraj Bhat
- Produced by: N. Kumar; Yogaraj Bhat
- Starring: Jaggesh; Rakshit Shetty; Aishani Shetty; Parul Yadav
- Cinematography: Santosh Rai Pathaje
- Edited by: Suresh Arumugam
- Music by: V. Harikrishna
- Production company: Yogaraj Movies
- Release date: 2 April 2015
- Running time: 145 minutes
- Country: India
- Language: Kannada

Vaastu Prakaara is a 2015 Indian Kannada language satirical comedy film written and directed by Yogaraj Bhat starring Jaggesh, Rakshit Shetty, Aishani Shetty and Parul Yadav. The supporting cast features Anant Nag, Sudha Rani, T. N. Seetharam and Sudha Belawadi. The film deals in the belief of Indians in astrology and superstition and how it is being blindly followed and overlooked over science.

Upon theatrical release on 2 April 2015, the film received mixed reviews from critics. They felt, carrying expectations along as a 'Yogaraj Bhat film', the film failed to deliver as it lacked a "strong foundation" and "a sound structure". However, the performances of Jaggesh and Nag received unanimous praise.

== Cast ==
- Jaggesh as Jagadeesh (Jaggu)
- Rakshit Shetty as Kubera
- Anant Nag as Anantha Krishna
- Sudha Rani as Vandana
- Aishani Shetty as Ritu
- Parul Yadav as Lawyer Nirmala
- T. N. Seetharam
- Sudha Belawadi
- Yogesh Kumar
- Rockline Sudhakar
- Prashanth Siddi as a man speaking gibberish

== Production ==
Yogaraj Bhat's first directorial came in Mani (2003) produced by Kari Subbu, and his second came in Ranga SSLC (2004) produced by N. Kumar. Bhat announced that he would direct a film under their production in February 2013, which however did not take off for over a year. After the announcement of Vaastu Prakaara by Bhat, who would co-produce the film, he announced that a percentage of the film's profits would go to Subbu and Kumar, considering the average performances of Mani and Ranga SSLC.

=== Casting ===
The film was announced in March 2014. Reports said Rakshit Shetty and Amulya would be playing the lead roles in the film. A week later, reports carried news of Rachita Ram having replaced Amulya as the female lead. However, reports in early May 2014 finalized that Aishani Shetty would be playing the female lead, following Ram's commitment to another Kannada film Dheera Rana Vikrama. Jaggesh was confirmed to play a parallel lead in the film, in late March 2014. Film and television series director T. N. Seetharam was signed to play a pivotal role in the film, who marked his return to acting after a brief hiatus. One among Ragini Dwivedi, Neethu and Nikita Thukral were speculated to play the supporting female lead, opposite Jaggesh. However, Parul Yadav was signed later for the role.

=== Filming ===
The film was launched on 2 May 2014, with a muhurat shot taken at a Hindu temple in Bangalore. The first schedule of the filming was completed in Switzerland by the end of June 2014. The second schedule began in Bangalore in mid-July 2014 at the Bangalore Palace, that apart from the leads, featured Anant Nag and Sudha Rani playing supporting roles. The filming completed in September 2014, and was set for a 2 October release, but got delayed however in its post-production stages.

=== Marketing ===
Prior to the release of the film's video trailer, an audio teaser was launched and was released on YouTube on 6 December 2014. It featured a gibberish language spoken by Aishani Shetty, Siddi Prashanth and Arasu, in Kannada, Hindi and an African language, with subtitles in Kannada. Promotions were then carried out in the TV series Maja Talkies, following which the team promoted the film during one of the matches of the Celebrity Cricket League in January 2015.

== Soundtrack ==
Vaastu Prakaara

Soundtrack album by V. Harikrishna
- Released: 12 December 2014
- Recorded: 2014
- Genre: Feature film soundtrack
- Length: 17:37
- Label: D Beats
- Producer: V. Harikrishna

V. Harikrishna composed the background score for the film and its soundtrack whose lyrics were written by Yogaraj Bhat and Jayant Kaikini. The album which consists of five tracks. It was released in Bangalore on 12 December 2014.

Track listing
No.	Title	Lyrics	Artist(s)	Length
1.	"Vaastu Prakaara"	Yogaraj Bhat	Tippu, Yogaraj Bhat	3:20
2.	"Simply Met Her"	Yogaraj Bhat	V. Harikrishna	4:15
3.	"Besara Kaatara"	Yogaraj Bhat	Sonu Nigam	4:00
4.	"Biddalle"	Jayant Kaikini	Vijay Prakash	3:35
5.	"Vaastu Prakaara theme"	–	V. Harikrishna	2:27
Total length:				17:37

=== Critical reception ===
Veena of Filmibeat.com rated the album 4/5 and called it "melodious and romantic".

== Release and reception ==
The film released theatrically on 2 April 2015. Upon release, the film received mixed reviews from critics. Shyam Prasad S. of Bangalore Mirror reviewed the film, rated it 3/5 and wrote, "With Vaastu Prakara, Bhat breaks his style of film-making that focused excessively on characterisation and hardly on the story. This film has something of a story and not any simple subject at that." He added, " It is dialogue-heavy like any other Bhat film. What works for the film is the brilliance of Jaggesh." Muralidhara Khajane of The Hindu felt that Yogaraj Bhat, who keeps stakes high when he makes a film, had his "magic missing". On performances of the actors, he wrote, "Jaggesh who carries the burden of the film to a larger extent. Rakshit and Ishani have nothing major to offer. Anant Nag, Sudha Belwadi, Seetharam and Sudhara Rani will not disappoint the audience." Shashiprasad S. M. of Deccan Chronicle felt that the film was "as an entertaining package disappointing and certainly not his [Yogaraj Bhat] best ever". He concluded writing, "With few good songs, and Jaggesh being the only saviour, Vaastu Prakara lacks Yogaraj's usual magic." A. Sharadhaa of The New Indian Express, like other critics felt that the film "disappoints mainly because of the towering expectation from a Bhatru [Yogaraj Bhat] film." On the acting performances, she wrote, "The film could get a devoted cult following in part because of the humorous and delightful performance by Jaggesh. He is accompanied well by Rakshit Shetty. Parul Yadav is apt in the role of a lawyer. Young Aishani Shetty has given her best shot too. This apart, the supporting cast of Sudharani, Anant Nag, Sudha Belawadi, and T N Seetharam play their parts to perfection." Shivrajkumar from Nam Cinema put up a Kannada review which concludes that "though there is good message of Yograj Bhat telling to shun the walls of ego/doubtfulness in mind is the actual Vaastu needed for humans, the screenplay lets down at places"

=== Box-office ===
The film opened strongly at the box-office and collected ₹3.78 crore (US$390,000) at the end of three days from release. At the end of five days, it stood at ₹6.11 crore (US$630,000).
