= Janardhan Chikkanna =

Film director

Jananrdhan Chikkanna
- Occupation(s): Director, screenwriter, producer
- Years active: 2018–present

Janardhan Chikkanna is an Indian film director and screenwriter who works in Kannada cinema. He rose to fame following the success of his directorial debut Gultoo.

== Career ==
Janardhan took to films after completing his graduation in engineering and says that his course influenced the subject of Gultoo. He went on to do a course at the MGR Government Film and Television Institute. When he passed out of there in 2015, Janardhan was sure that he didn’t want to assist any director or knock on producers’ doors with a script in hand. He made his directorial debut in 2018 with Gultoo, that throws light on individual privacy and our vulnerability online, a cyber crime thriller. The movie stars Naveen Shankar, Sonu Gowda, Rangayana Raghu and Avinash.

== Filmography ==
Year	Film	Director	Writer	Notes
2018	Gultoo	Yes	Yes	
2020	Sarvajanikarige Suvarnavakasha	No	Yes	Also producer
2024	Powder	Yes	No	
2025	Agnyathavasi	Yes	No	
