= Sarvajanikarige Suvarnavakasha =

2019 Kannada Film

- Film poster
- Directed by: Anoop Ramaswamy Kashyap
- Written by: Janardhan Chikkanna
- Produced by: Prashant Reddy; Devraj Ramanna; Janardhan Chikkanna
- Starring: Rishi; Dhanya Balakrishna; Siddu Moolimani; Rangayana Raghu
- Cinematography: Vignesh Raj
- Edited by: Shanth Kumar
- Music by: Midhun Mukundan
- Production company: Vivid Films
- Release date: 20 December 2019
- Running time: 121 minutes
- Country: India
- Language: Kannada

Sarvajanikarige Suvarnavakasha (transl. Golden opportunity for the public) is a 2019 Kannada-language comedy film written and directed by Anoop Ramaswamy Kashyap, based on the short story The Necklace (1884) by Guy de Maupassant. The film stars Rishi and Dhanya Balakrishna in her Kannada debut. Janardhan Chikkanna wrote the script and acted as producer for the film.

== Plot ==
MBA students Vedanth aka Vedhu and Janhavi are lovers. Janhavi goes with Vedhu to wear the golden chain to celebrate her birthday. After the celebration, they go to the hotel, where a heated argument occurs between Vedhu and another group of boys. This then turns into a brawl. During the brawl, Janhavi lost her chain, which is given by her mother. After searching for the chain, it was not found. Vedanth says he'll purchase a new chain by the end of the day.

Vedanth's father who needs money takes loans from everyone. He put his house and wife Mangalya Sutra as collateral with a pawn business. Finally, Vedhu pawns his bike for money but, he only got half of the money needed to buy a new chain. Raghu, a friend of Vedhu suggests gambling to double the money. Vedhu only has 35K which what he got for selling the bike. The chain costs 70K, so Vedhu agreed to gamble. Things turned for the worst in betting, they lost 70K. Now in debt, the two have to pay their dues back to Shiva who is in charge of this business. Shiva only gives them till 11 in the morning to pay up otherwise, they'll be dead. After many shenanigans they finally get enough funds to pay back Shiva due to their marketing talents. Janhavi, who is the mother of Padma, found the chain all along in her bag. It was dropped accidentally when the brawl had occurred. Vendhu, after all, was able to pay back Shiva, get his bike back, and finally his mother's Mangalya Sutra.

== Cast ==
- Rishi as Vedanth aka Vedu
- Dhanya Balakrishna as Janhavi
- Siddu Moolimani as Raghu
- Rangayana Raghu as Single Hand Shiva
- Dattanna as Devraj
- Mitra as Yeshappa
- Papa Pandu Shalini as Padma

== Soundtrack ==
Sarvajanikarige Suvarnavakasha

Soundtrack album by Midhun Mukundan
- Released: 2019
- Recorded: 2019
- Studio: Vivid Films
- Genre: Feature film soundtrack
- Length: 15:55
- Label: Anand Audio
- Producer: Midhun Mukundan

Midhun Mukundan chronology
Sarvajanikarige Suvarnavakasha (2019)	Mayabazar 2016 (2020)

No.	Title	Lyrics	Singer(s)	Length
1.	"Sarvajanikarige Suvarnavakasha title song"	V. Nagendra Prasad	Shashank Sheshagiri	3:52
2.	"Yenu Swamy Maadona"	V. Nagendra Prasad	Puneeth Rajkumar	3:53
3.	"Devare Devare"	All Ok, Anoop Ramaswamy Kashyap	All Ok, Midhun Mukundan, Arpith Gowda	4:08
4.	"Neelaakasha Kelu"	Anoop Ramaswamy Kashyap	Haricharan, Rakshita Rao	4:24

== Critical reception ==
Sunayana Suresh of The Times of India gave the film 3/5 stars and wrote, "Sarvajanikarige Suvarnavakaasha is fun and has enough laughs amid all the confusion. The film is a fun roller-coaster ride, but the twists and turns could have been a tad more to ensure a more exhilarating one." A. Sharadhaa of The New Indian Express wrote, "The film brings in several twists. However, the betting and the chasing episodes are too long, and test the viewers’ patience." Aravind Shwetha of The News Minute wrote, "Sarvajanikarige Suvarnavakasha can be a good watch if you can excuse the slow pace and repetitiveness of the film."
