= Dharani Mandala Madhyadolage (2022 film) =

2022 Indian film

- Directed by: Sridhar Shanmukha
- Produced by: Omkar Aryaa
- Starring: Naveen Shankar; Aishani Shetty; Yash Shetty; Siddu Moolimani; Bala Rajwadi; Prakash Thuminad; Omkar Aryaa; Nitesh Mahaan
- Cinematography: Keertan Poojary
- Edited by: Ujwal Chandra
- Music by: Ronada Bakkesh; Karthik Chennoji Rao
- Production company: Hyperlink Cinemas
- Release date: 2 November 2022
- Country: India
- Language: Kannada

Dharani Mandala Madhyadolage is a 2022 Indian Kannada-language crime drama film produced by Omkar Aryaa and directed by Sridhar Shanmukha, starring Naveen Shankar and Aishani Shetty with an ensemble supporting cast.

== Premise ==
Dharani Mandala Madhyadolage revolves around different people in different situations face their feelings on one fateful night.

== Cast ==
- Naveen Shankar as Aadi
- Aishani Shetty as Shreya
- Yash Shetty as Shivu
- Siddu Moolimani as Parachute
- Shambhavi
- Omkar Aryaa as Disco
- Jayashree Aradhya
- Prakash Thuminad as Marayade Ramanna
- Nitesh Mahaan as Slow Motion
- Bala Rajwadi as Antony
- Ramya Krishna
- Mohan Juneja
- Kari Subbu
- Kaddipudi Kanthraj as Turke

== Production ==
The film was launched in 2019 and completed shooting in 2021. The film's title is based on the folk song "Punyakoti".

== Music ==
The film's soundtrack album and score was composed by Ronada Bakkesh and Karthik Chennoji Rao.

List of songs
| No. | Title | Lyrics | Singer(s) | Length |
|---|---|---|---|---|
| 1. | "Water Mele" | S.K.S | Sharan (actor) | 4:18 |
| 2. | "Maatu Maatalle" | Ghouse Peer | Vijay Prakash | 3:18 |
| 3. | "Maatu Maatalle (Cover)" | Ghouse Peer | Vijay Prakash | 2:12 |

== Reception ==
A critic from The New Indian Express wrote that "A full-fledged hyperlink subject is rarely attempted in Kannada, and Sridhar’s intelligent narrative makes a complex script an interestingly riveting story that takes place in one night". A critic from Bangalore Mirror wrote that "It seems the director has added as many characters as possible without bothering about the plight of the audiences who have to spend their valuable time and money to watch this movie". A critic from The Times of India wrote that "Dharani Mandala Madhydolage is a commendable attempt. The film will stay with the audience for a while even after walking out of the theatres". A critic from OTTplay wrote that "Dharani Mandala Madhyadolage is certainly an intriguing attempt that explores causality in a few novel ways but the film is let down by unimaginative writing".
