= Yuddhakaanda Chapter 2 =

2025 Kannada-language film

- Theatrical release poster
- Directed by: Pavan Bhat
- Written by: Pavan Bhat; Ajay Rao
- Produced by: Ajay Rao
- Starring: Ajay Rao; Archana Jois; Prakash Belawadi; T. S. Nagabharana; Radhnya Rakesh; Supritha Satyanarayana; Sathvik Krishnan
- Cinematography: S. K. Karthik Sharma
- Edited by: Sri CrazyMindz
- Music by: Hemanth Jois; K. B. Praveen
- Production companies: Ajay Rao Productions; Sri Krishna Arts and Creations
- Release date: 18 April 2025
- Running time: 105 minutes
- Country: India
- Language: Kannada

Yuddhakaanda: Chapter 2 is a 2025 Indian Kannada language legal drama film directed by Pavan Bhat. It stars Ajay Rao, Archana Jois and Prakash Belawadi in lead roles. The film was released on 18 April 2025 and received mixed to positive reviews from critics as well as audience.

== Cast ==
- Ajay Rao as Bharath Hanumanth
- Archana Jois as Nivedita
- Prakash Belawadi as Robert D'Souza
- Radhnya Rakesh as Nivedita's daughter
- Sathvik Krishnan as Jackie
- Supritha Satyanarayana as Sapna
- T. S. Nagabharana

== Release ==
The film was released on 18 April 2025.
