= Dear Vikram =

2022 Kannada action drama film

- Directed by: K. S. Nandheesh
- Written by: K. S. Nandheesh
- Produced by: K. S. Nandheesh
- Starring: Sathish Ninasam; Shraddha Srinath
- Edited by: Srikanth
- Music by: Tony Joseph Pallivathukal; Judah Sandhy
- Production companies: Backgate Productions; Jacob Films; Leader Film Productions; Sathish Picture House
- Release date: 30 June 2022
- Country: India
- Language: Kannada

Dear Vikram is a 2022 Indian Kannada-language action drama film directed by K. S. Nandheesh starring Sathish Ninasam and Shraddha Srinath. The film released after a five-year delay.

== Cast ==
- Sathish Ninasam as Vikram
- Shraddha Srinath as Nitya
- Vasishta N. Simha as Bharat
- Raksha Somashekar as Nidhi
- Sonu Gowda in an extended cameo
- Achyuth Kumar as Politician

== Production and release ==
The film was initially titled Godhra but was changed to Dear Vikram in 2022 after the CBFC objected the title attributing its similarity to the Godhra riots. The film began production in 2017, but only released in 2022 due to the delay caused by the COVID-19 pandemic. The film was shot in multiple Indian states and Malaysia.

The film was to release in 2020 after shooting for most of the film was complete except for the introduction song. The film streamed on Voot Select on 30 June 2022.

== Reception ==
Muralidhara Khajane of The Hindu opined that "In his enthusiasm to address multiple burning socio-economic, cultural, religious and political issues in the span of one film, director Nandeesh seems to have lost his focus". Sunayana Suresh of The Times of India said that "Dear Vikram could have been a film that could have raised interesting debates on the current political situation, but it ends up falling short as the tale seems too rushed between some unnecessary songs and sequences". Jayadeep Jayesh of Deccan Herald called the film "a total misfire".
