= Naduve Antaravirali =

2018 Kannada film by Raveen Kumaara

- Theatrical Poster
- Directed by: Raveen Kumaara
- Written by: Raveen Kumaara
- Based on: Aadhalal Kadhal Seiveer (2013) by Suseenthiran
- Produced by: Raveen Kumaara; G. K. Nagaraja
- Starring: Prakhyath Paramesh; Aishani Shetty
- Cinematography: Yogi
- Edited by: Ganesh Mallaiah
- Music by: Kadri Manikanth
- Production company: Brunda Production
- Release date: 5 October 2018
- Running time: 108 min
- Country: India
- Language: Kannada

Naduve Antaravirali (Kannada: ನಡುವೆ ಅಂತರವಿರಲಿ) is a 2018 Kannada romantic drama film written and directed by Raveen Kumaara, produced by Raveen Kumaara and G. K. Nagaraja. It co-stars Prakhyath Paramesh alongside Aishani Shetty in the lead roles. Achyuth Kumar, Chikkanna, Tulasi Shivamani, Aruna Balraj and Srinivas Prabhu feature in supporting roles. This is the remake of the Tamil film Aadhalal Kadhal Seiveer (2013).

== Plot ==
Naduve Antaravirali opens with Sanjay (Prakhyath Paramesh), an engineering student, tries to propose his love for his college-mate Nithya (Aishani Shetty) in a moving bus and getting injured after falling down due to her rejection. After some initial tries, the two fall in love, but it gets difficult when they get involved in an intimate relationship, ignoring academics and warnings. They soon face the consequences for the same. It ends with some message to college students to fall in love, but not to cross the limits and instead concentrate on academics.

== Cast ==
- Prakhyath Paramesh as Sanjay
- Aishani Shetty as Nithya
- Achyuth Kumar
- Chikkanna
- Tulasi Shivamani
- Aruna Balraj
- Srinivas Prabhu

== Production ==
The shooting of the movie started and finished in 2018. Shooting was completed in 48 days.

== Soundtrack ==
The music of the movie has been composed by Manikanth Kadri. The movie has five songs.

Naduve Antaravirali (soundtrack)

Studio album by Manikanth Kadri
- Released: 2018
- Genre: Feature film soundtrack
- Label: PRK Audio

Tracklist
No.	Title	Lyrics	Singer(s)	Length
1.	"Shaakuntle Sikkalu"	V. Nagendra Prasad	Sanjith Hegde	03:45
2.	"Kannu Kannu"	V. Nagendra Prasad	Supriya Lohith	03:56
3.	"Ele Vayasina"	Ghouse Peer	Deepak Doddera, Eesha Suchi	04:16
4.	"Paraaga Sparsha"	Yogaraj Bhat	Mythri Iyer	04:21
5.	"Oh Olave"	V. Nagendra Prasad	Madhu Balakrishnan	05:47

== Awards ==
- 66th Filmfare Awards South: Best Playback Singer (Male): Sanjith Hegde — Shaakuntle Sikkalu
