= Happy Birthday to Me (2024 film) =

Indian Kannada-language black comedy film

Happy Birthday To Me
- Promotional release poster
- Directed by: Rakesh Kadri
- Written by: Rakesh Kadri
- Starring: Chaithra J Achar; Sidhartha Maadhyamika; Siddu Moolimani
- Cinematography: Vishnu Prasad P
- Edited by: Rahul Vasishta
- Music by: Vinay Shankar
- Production company: Shoolin Films
- Release date: 28 June 2024
- Country: India
- Language: Kannada

Happy Birthday To Me is a 2024 Indian Kannada-language black comedy film directed by Rakesh Kadri and starring Chaithra J Achar, Sidhartha Maadhyamika, and Siddu Moolimani. The film is partly inspired by Alfred Hitchcock's Rope (1948). The film was directly released on several OTT platforms.

== Cast ==
- Chaithra J Achar as Adithi
- Sidhartha Maadhyamika as Puneeth
- Siddu Moolimani as Tirumalesh aka Trippy
- Gopalkrishna Deshpande as Janardhan
- Archana Kottige as neighbour
- Natya Ranga as apartment security guard
- Suhan Prasad as Krishna
- Rahul Amin
- Arpith Indravadhan

== Production ==
The film was shot in Mangaluru.

== Soundtrack ==
The music was composed by Vinay Shankar, who also co-wrote the lyrics with Karthik Gubbi.

== Reception ==
A. Sharadhaa of Cinema Express rated the film 3.5/5 stars and wrote, "The story, characters, and perfectly orchestrated music guide you through two hours of suspenseful enjoyment. However, Happy Birthday to Me does leave one longing for a more satisfying climax". Sridevi S of The Times of India gave the film the same rating and wrote, " The movie sure initially tests the patience with a repeated pattern, but that is just the director warming up the audience for a fun ride ahead". Shashiprasad SM of Times Now gave the film the same rating and wrote, "Rakesh Kadri-directorial Happy Birthday To Me is indeed a happy film to watch. The film offers some good time with no extreme drama attached to it". Vivek M. V. of The Hindu wrote, "Happy Birthday to Me is inconsistently paced, and you need to stay patient for the best moments to pop up between the bland portions. However, despite the flaws, this is another indie Kannada movie attempting to break the mould, and full marks to Kadri and his team for daring to experiment". Prathibha Joy of OTTplay rated the film 2.5/5 stars and wrote, "For the most part, Happy Birthday To Me is a breezy watch, offering the occasional chuckle too. But it doesn’t leave one entirely satisfied".
