= Aishani Shetty =

Indian actress

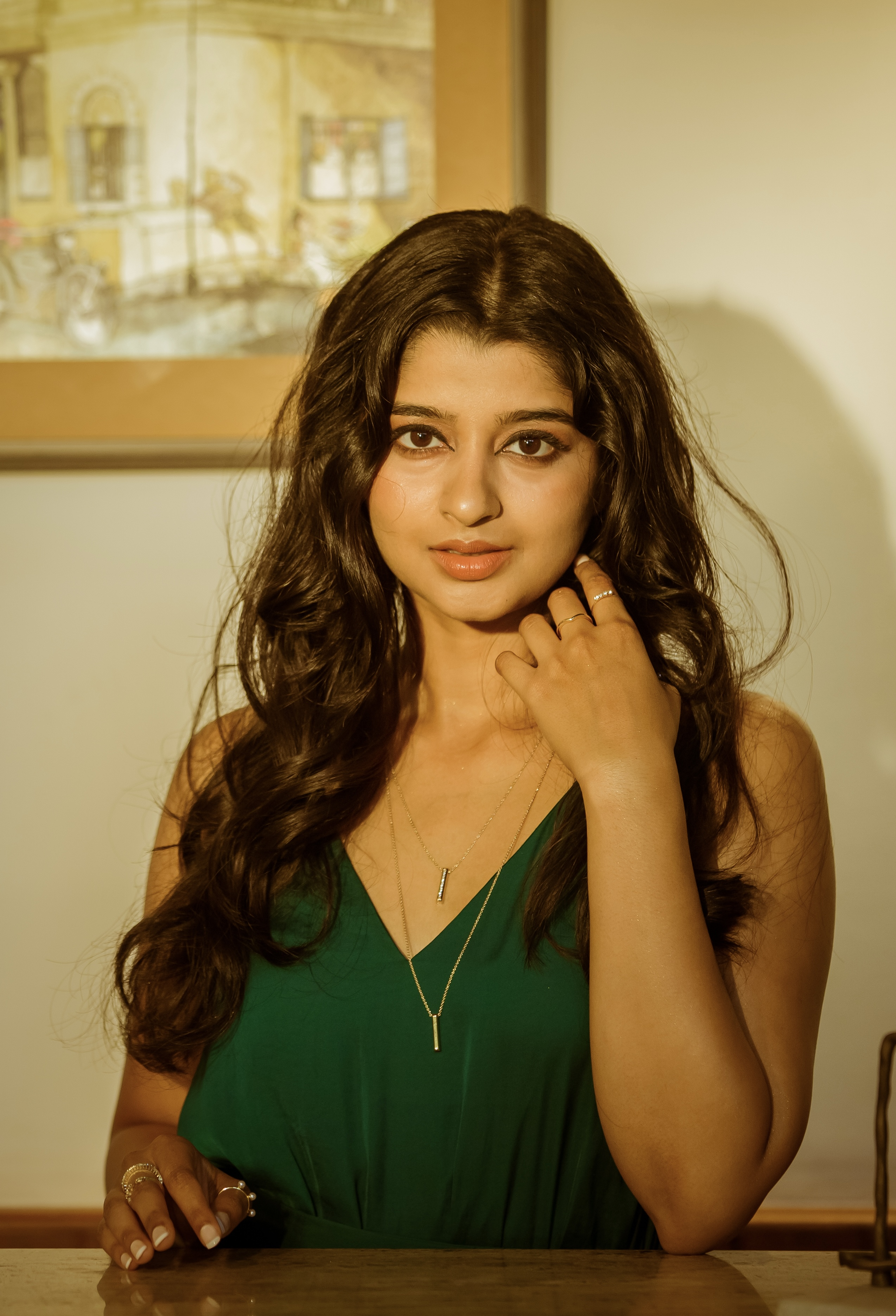
- Born: Puttur, Karnataka, India
- Education: St Joseph's College, Bangalore
- Occupations: Actress; Director; Writer; Singer
- Years active: 2014–present

Aishani Shetty is an Indian actress and director, who works predominantly in the Kannada film industry. She made her debut film with the film Jyothi Alias Kothi Raja in (2014). She made her break through the film Vaastu Prakaara in (2015) for she was nominated for IIFA Utsavam Award for Best actress. She also acted in Rocket (2015), Naduve Antaravirali (2018) and Dharani Mandala Madhyadolage (2022).

== Early life and education ==
Aishani Shetty is from Bangalore. She completed her schooling in Bishop Cotton Girls' School and pursued her Under- Graduation in Jyoti Nivas College, Bangalore. Aishani has a Master's degree in Mass Communication and Journalism from St Joseph's College, Bangalore.

== Career ==
=== Actress ===
Aishani made her debut film with the Jyothi Alias Kothi Raja in the year 2014. She made her break in the Kannada Film Industry with the film Vaastu Prakaara directed by Yogaraj Bhat in the year 2015. She was nominated for Best Actress in a leading role IIFA Utsavam for the same. She went on to act in Rocket (film) opposite Sathish Ninasam which was released in November 2015. Rocket (film) marked her debut as singer, where she rendered the female voice opposite Puneeth Rajkumar for the song 'Thannage Idvi'. Aishani took a short break from films while pursuing her master's degree. During this period she acted in Kannada romantic drama Naduve Antaravirali. In 2022, she appeared in the film Dharani Mandala Madhyadolage.

=== Director ===
Along with her acting career Aishani made her debut as a director with the short film 'Kaaji'. Her directorial debut was officially screened at several international film festivals in 2017 including Bangalore Shorts Film Festival, Pink City International Film Festival. Kaaji won several awards including Best Film award at SIIMA and Best Debutant Director award Pink City International Film Festival.

== Filmography ==
=== Films ===
- All films are in Kannada unless otherwise noted.

Year	Film	Role	Notes	Ref.
2014	Jyothi Alias Kothi Raja	Kamli		
2015	Vaastu Prakaara	Ritu	Nominated—IIFA Utsavam Award for Best actress	
2015	Plus	Herself	Guest appearance	
2015	Rocket	Dr. Shwetha	Also singer of "Thannage Idvi" song	
2018	Naduve Antaravirali	Nithya		
2019	Nam Gani B Com Pass	Amulya		
2022	Dharani Mandala Madhyadolage	Shreya		
2023	Hondisi Bareyiri	Saniha		
2023	Breathe	Journalist	Telugu film	

=== As director ===
Year	Films	Director	Writer	Notes	Ref.
2019	Kaaji	Yes	Yes	Debut as Director; Short Film	

== Awards ==
Year	Film	Award	Result	Notes
2015	Vaastu Prakaara	IIFA Utsavam Award For Best actress	Nominated	
2019	Kaaji	Best Film award SIIMA	Won	
2019	Kaaji	Best Actress award SIIMA	Won	
2019	Kaaji	Best Debutant Director award 5th Pink City International Film Festival	Won	Short Film
2019	Kaaji	Best Film award 7th Bangalore Shorts Film Festival	Won	
