= Nodadha Putagalu =

2023 Indian film

- Directed by: Vasanth Kumar S
- Written by: Vasanth Kumar S
- Produced by: Vasanth Kumar S
- Starring: Preetham Makkhihaali; Kavya Ramesh; Vilas Kulkarni; Ashok Rao; Shanti Gowda; Sowbhagya B Nihar P Gowda; Praanvi Gowda
- Cinematography: Kumar M
- Edited by: L Raghunatha
- Music by: Vighnesh Menon
- Release date: 21 April 2023
- Country: India
- Language: Kannada

Nodadha Putagalu is a 2023 Indian Kannada-language comedy, fantasy film produced and directed by Vasanth Kumar S, starring Preetham Makkhihaali, Kavya Ramesh, Ashok Rao, Sowbhagya B, and Nihar P Gowda with an ensemble supporting cast.

== Plot ==
Assistant Chitraksha from Yamaloka observes some emergency to a new born baby Adithya in the hospital when he comes to earth to execute his task, so he finds a special book which shows the future of the Adithya, so Chitraksha starts reading the book to know the eventful life of Adithya and different characters he meets in his life. He furthers reads to know how those characters come back in his life that changes the course of his journey.

== Cast ==
- Preetham Makkhihaali
- Kavya Ramesh
- Ashok Rao
- Shanti Gowda
- Sowbhagya B
- Nihaar P Gowda
- Praanvi Gowda
- Vilas Kulkarni

== Production ==
The film is directed by Vasanth Kumar S, who is a software engineer turned filmmaker. It was initially planned with Pruthvi Ambaar and Praveen Tej in the lead but later got shelved due to clash of dates. The trailer of the film was launched by Ashwini Puneeth Rajkumar, wife of Puneeth Rajkumar.

The film is supposed to be based on real-life incidents.

== Release ==
The film was released on 21 April 2023.

== Reception ==
It received a rather positive review in the Bangalore Mirror while Flickfeeds praised its narrative technique.
