= Shri Balaji Photo Studio =

Indian drama film

- Directed by: Raajesh Dhruva
- Written by: Abhishek Sirsi
- Screenplay by: Pruthvikanth L. And Raajesh Dhruva
- Story by: Abhishek Sirsi
- Produced by: B. Venkateswar Rao
- Starring: Raajesh Dhruva
- Cinematography: Manoj Cinestudio
- Edited by: Ganapathi Bhat
- Music by: Songs; Shriram Gandharva; Score: Swasthik Kaarekaad
- Production company: Srujana Productions
- Release date: 6 January 2023
- Running time: 147 minutes
- Country: India
- Language: Kannada

Shri Balaji Photo Studio is a 2023 Indian Kannada-language drama film directed by Rajesh Dhruva starring himself in the titular role.

== Cast ==
- Rajesh Dhruva as Puttu
- Radhika Achuth Rao as Nethra Hakkimane
- Ravi Salian as Suresha
- Sampath J. Ram as Shankar Hakkimane
- Nakul Sharma as Maani
- Ravi Mururu as Subbanna
- Rakshith Naag as Pradeepa
- Shubhalakshmi as Yashodha

== Production ==
In July 2022, it was announced that television actor Rajesh Dhruva made his feature film debut through this film which he directed and acted in. The film was initially titled Sri Balaji Photo Studio (Since 1979). The film was shot in Honnavara, Sirsi and Yellapura, Karnataka.

== Soundtrack ==
The music was composed by Shriram Gandharva and Swasthik Kaarekaad. Pramod Maravante and Raajesh Dhruva wrote the lyrics for two songs.

== Reception ==
The film was premiered on 5 January 2023, and it was theatrically released the following day.

A critic from The Times of India rated the film three out of five stars and wrote that "Overall, it is a feel-good film, which takes off only in the second half".
