= Jilla (soundtrack) =

Soundtrack album of Jilla by D. Imman
- Released: 21 December 2013
- Recorded: 2013
- Genre: Feature film soundtrack
- Length: 33:31
- Language: Tamil
- Label: Star Music
- Producer: D. Imman

D. Imman chronology
Pandiya Naadu (2013)	Jilla (2013)	Anjada Gandu (2014)

Jilla is the soundtrack album of the 2014 Tamil film of the same name directed by T. Nesan starring Mohanlal, Vijay and Kajal Aggarwal. The film's soundtrack and background score were composed by D. Imman which marks his first collaboration with Mohanlal and Nesan and his second collaboration with Vijay after the 2002 Tamil film Thamizhan. The soundtrack consists of 6 Tracks and 2 Karaoke Tracks whose lyrics were written by Yugabharathi, Vairamuthu and Viveka. Vijay along with Shreya Ghoshal crooned for the song Kandangi Kandangi. The audio rights of the film were purchased by Star Music. The album was released on 21 December 2013 and received positive response from critics as well as audience.

== Production ==
D. Imman was signed as the music director which marks his first collaboration with Mohanlal and Nesan and his second collaboration with Vijay after the 2002 Tamil film Thamizhan. The lyrics were written by Yugabharathi, Vairamuthu and Viveka. Vijay along with Shreya Ghoshal crooned for the song Kandangi Kandangi. Introduction song of the film was sung by S. P. Balasubrahmanyam and Shankar Mahadevan. The official track list was released on 16 December 2013 along with the one of Ajith's Veeram. On 18 December 2013 Imman unveiled the promo songs of the film and the full album was released on 21 December 2013.

== Track list ==
Tracklist
No.	Title	Lyrics	Artist(s)	Length
1.	"Pattu Onnu"	Yugabharathi	Shankar Mahadevan, S. P. Balasubrahmanyam	04:22
2.	"Verasa Pogayile"	Parvathy	D. Imman, Swetha Suresh	04:17
3.	"Jingunamani"	Viveka	Sunidhi Chauhan, Ranjith	04:21
4.	"Kandaangi Kandaangi"	Vairamuthu	Vijay, Shreya Ghoshal	04:56
5.	"Yeppa Maama Treatu?"	Viveka	A. V. Pooja, D. Imman, Snigdha Chandra	04:27
6.	"Jilla Theme"	Viveka	Anand, Deepak, Santhosh Hariharan, Shenbagaraj	03:07
7.	"Kandaangi Kandaangi Karaoke"		Instrumental	04:55
8.	"Verasa Pogayile Karaoke"		Instrumental	04:16
Total length:				33:31

== Reception ==
Behindwoods rated 3.25/5, stating "Imman’s class meets Mohanlal and Vijay's mass". Top10 Cinema said "On the whole, Jilla songs are good and they’re sure to top the charts within a short span of time. D Imman has very well used the opportunity and has done a fabulous job for both superstars. Massive treat for Complete Actor Lalettan and Ilayathalapathy fans". Cinemalead rated 3.5/5 and commented "Sure shot winner". Indiaglitz gave 3.9/5 and stated "The nail-biting wait has come to an end, and 'Jilla' has matched up to expectations to the fullest. Imman has composed some of the finest tunes, tailor-made for the youthful josh. But it is not restricted one age-group - the songs are for all, as everyone will enjoy this energy, without exception. With this, the expectations about the film has risen up multiple notches, as we gear up for a smashing maattu Pongal this January". Shreya Ghoshal was nominated for Filmfare Award for Best Female Playback Singer-Tamil.
