= Aghori (2023 Tamil film) =

2023 Indian film by D.S.Rajkumar

- Release poster
- Directed by: D.S.Rajkumar
- Written by: D.S.Rajkumar
- Produced by: Suresh K Menon
- Starring: Sidhu Sid; Shruthi Ramakrishnan; Sayaji Shinde
- Cinematography: A.V. Vasanth
- Edited by: Rajkumar
- Music by: 4 Musics
- Production company: Motion Film Picture Inc.
- Release date: 15 December 2023
- Country: India
- Language: Tamil

Aghori is a 2023 Indian Tamil-language action horror film written and directed by D.S.Rajkumar. The film stars Sidhu Sid, Shruthi Ramakrishnan and Sayaji Shinde in the lead roles. The film was produced by Suresh K Menon under the banner of Motion Film Picture Inc.

== Cast ==
- Sidhu Sid
- Shruthi Ramakrishnan
- Sayaji Shinde
- Mime Gopi
- Vetri Vijay
- Madhan Gopal

== Production ==
The film was produced by Suresh K Menon under the banner of Motion Film Picture Inc. The cinematography was done by A.V. Vasanth, while editing was handled by Rajkumar.

== Reception ==
A critic from Maalai Malar stated that "Although the story of the film is known at the beginning, will the people trapped in the haunted house escape? He thinks to make it interesting till the end".Times Now critic wrote that "Aghori successfully merges a haunting premise, stellar performances, and skilled direction,....." and gave three out of five star
