= Gultoo =

2018 Kannada film

- Theatrical Poster
- Directed by: Janardhan Chikkanna
- Screenplay by: Janardhan Chikkanna, Avinash Lakshmaiah
- Story by: Janardhan Chikkanna
- Produced by: Vivid Films
- Starring: Naveen Shankar; Sonu Gowda; Avinash; Rangayana Raghu; Pawan Kumar
- Cinematography: Shanthi Sagar H G
- Edited by: Bharath M C
- Music by: Amit Anand
- Production company: Vivid Films
- Release date: 30 March 2018
- Running time: 127 minutes
- Country: India
- Language: Kannada

Gultoo is a 2018 Indian Kannada language cyber-thriller film written and directed by Janardhan Chikkanna and scored by Amit Anand, released by Vivid Films. It stars Naveen Shankar and Sonu Gowda along with Rangayana Raghu and Avinash. Shanti Sagar is the film's cinematographer.

== Plot ==
Alok (Naveen Shankar) is an orphan who gains popularity in his college by hacking an online movie booking website, enabling his seniors to watch a movie as part of a ragging task. After college, he and his friend Aasthi (Ram Dhanush) stay together where Alok works as a Computer Science trainer in a Computer Institute where he falls in love with Pooja (Sonu Gowda). Pooja is later revealed to be an undercover officer of the Indian Intelligence Bureau. She seduces and sleeps with Alok to collect the details and password of his computer. Later with the help of Phaneesh (Pawan Kumar), a techie, she tries to pin Alok, who turns out to be the prime suspect in the theft of the Sudhar data from the storage centre.

== Cast ==
- Naveen Shankar as Alok
- Sonu Gowda as Pooja Ramesh/Anagha
- Avinash as Circle Inspector Avinash
- Rangayana Raghu as Chief Minister Anantharamaiah
- Pawan Kumar as Techie Phaneesh
- Pradeep Doddaiah as lecturer
- Ram Dhanush as Arasiah Thimmappa alias Aasthi

== Production ==
=== Casting and filming ===
Shankar's entry into Gultoo was through association with college batchmate and director Janardhan Chikkanna.

=== Marketing ===
Multiple posters were created for the film during its release. Director Janardhan Chikkana told The New Indian Express that "there was a producer-pitch trailer, in which every actor wore glasses with round frames, and this became a highlight".

== Soundtrack ==
Gultoo

Soundtrack album by Amit Anand
- Released: 2018
- Recorded: 2017
- Genre: Feature film soundtrack
- Length: 18:28
- Labels: Vivid Films and Divo
- Producers: Amit Anand, Hriday Goswami

Amit Anand composed the score and songs for the film. The lyrics for the songs were written by Jayanth Kaikini, Kiran Kaverappa and Anoop Ramaswamy Kashyap.

Track list
No.	Title	Lyrics	Singer(s)	Length
1.	"Saalaagi"	Anoop Ramaswamy Kashyap	Saindhavi, Deepak Doddera	04:03
2.	"VTU We love you"	Kiran Kaverappa	Raghu Dixit, Ankna Arockiam	05:32
3.	"Neenondu Ashcharya"	Jayanth Kaikini	Eesha Suchi, Deepak Doddera	04:05
4.	"Kadalaache"	Anoop Ramaswamy Kashyap	Supriya Lohith, Raghuram	03:51
5.	"Kaanada Preethi"	Anoop Ramaswamy Kashyap	Jasmine Munns, Amit Anand	01:01

== Critical response ==
The film opened to positive reviews from critics upon theatrical release. Writing for The News Minute, Rakesh Mehar praised the film, saying that “it comes as a bit of a surprise to see Sandalwood pick up on the topic of Aadhaar and data theft so quickly.” Rating the movie 3.5 out of 5, Sunayana Suresh from The Times of India says “The freshness in the narrative and the extensive research show that director Janardhan Chikkanna is someone to watch out for.” “Gultoo has the elements of a musical-romance and a thriller. But it is spread out in the form of a tragicomedy – a tragicomedy because the viewers are left scratching their heads at the blatant truth staring at them and applauding the makers’ vision at the same time" quoted The First Post. Deccan Chronicle said that “amidst all sorts of smart ‘leaks’ which has rocked the nation, raising big questions over the safety of all our personal data, here comes a perfect infotainment revolving around one such 'leak’ from another engineer turned director who makes an impressive mark, hacking into a sensible tale in his debut venture.” Prakash Upadhyaya from IB Times states that “It is a new-age movie that deals with data theft and exposes the way our data is being mined for money. It tries to showcase how our every single moment is recorded and has a price on the internet. In short, the movie shows how technology can bring misery to our lives but doesn't take a stand on whether tech is good or bad.”
