= Sathish Ninasam =

Indian Kannada film actor

- Born: Shiva; 20 June 1986 (age 40); Yaladahalli, Mandya, Karnataka, India
- Other name: Sathish Nina
- Occupations: Actor; Film producer; Singer; Lyricist
- Years active: 2008–present
- Mother: Chikkathayamma

Shiva, known by his screen name Sathish Ninasam, is an Indian actor who appears in Kannada films. Having made his film debut with Madesha (2008), Sathish appeared in small but significant roles in films like Manasaare (2009), Pancharangi (2010), Lifeu Ishtene (2011) and Anna Bond (2012). He shot to fame after his performance in Drama (2012). Sathish marked his debut as a hero in his 2013 film Lucia, which received critical acclaim nationally and internationally.

== Career ==
=== Theatre ===
Sathish began acting in street plays and gave more than a hundred shows in hundreds of villages and towns. He soon joined an amateur theatre group called 'Janadhani'. His first play from the troop was 'Smashana Kurukshetra', written by Kuvempu, in which he played 'Dharmaraya'. Sathish's life changing moment was when he joined Ninasam, a theatre institute in Heggodu, Shimoga district of Karnataka, where he completed a diploma course in acting. Following the course, he performed in several plays giving more than a hundred shows, across Karnataka, before landing in Bangalore in 2006. Indian literature and World literature has inspired him in his work and his life.

=== Film ===
Following his theatre career, Sathish appeared in Kannada TV soaps such as Paramapada, Takadimitha etc. After his stint in television for a year, he started his career in films in 2008, when he was offered a role in Madesha. He then appeared in small but significant roles in films like Manasaare, Pancharangi, Lifu Ishtene and Anna Bond. His role in Drama won him a nomination for SIIMA Award. Sathish marked his debut as a hero in the critically acclaimed psychological drama film Lucia, in 2013. The film premiered at the London Indian Film Festival in July 2013 and won the best film award and his performance won him accolades from critics and audiences.

Sathish's next releases of 2014 were Anjada Gandu (2014) and Kwatle Satisha (2014), both of which won him praise from critics.

His next film Love in Mandya was released on 28 November 2014 which won the hearts of the audiences. He was nominated for Best Actor SIIMA 2015, IIFA Utsavam Awards 2015 for Best Actor and won the Santosham Film Awards 2015 for Best Hero. In 2015 November, he made his mark as a producer with the release of his film Rocket under the banner Sathish Picture House. He also played the lead in the film which won him the SIIMA Award 2016 for Best Actor (Critics).

The films that followed were Beautiful Manasugalu (2017) which was critically acclaimed. His film Ayogya (2018) was a box office success. He won the Filmfare Awards for Best Actor.

The films that followed were Chambal (2019), Brahmachari (2019), and Petromax (2022).

== Filmography ==
=== As actor ===
Key
†	Denotes films that have not yet been released

List of films and roles
Year	Title	Role	Notes	Ref.
2008	Madesha	Guru Narayan's henchman		
2009	Manasaare	Sathish		
2009	Yogi	KK's brother		
2010	Pancharangi	Bus driver		
2010	Eno Onthara	Surya's friend		
2011	Rangappa Hogbitna	Shalini's lover		
2011	Gun	Ganesh's friend	Credited as Sathish	
2011	Puttakkana Highway	Farmer		
2011	Lifeu Ishtene	Shivakumar "Shivu"		
2011	Paramathma	Cab driver		
2011	Kaanchaana	Bikshuk Nair		
2012	Shikari	Manju / Madhu	Simultaneously shot in Malayalam	
2012	Anna Bond	Surya Honalkere		
2012	Addhuri	Auto driver		
2012	Hosa Prema Purana	Rahul		
2012	Drama	Kwatle Sathisha	Nominated, SIIMA Award for Best Comedian (Kannada)	
2013	Lucia	Nikhil and Nikki	Dual role; debut as lead	
2013	Dyavre	Chinkara		
2014	Anjada Gandu	Santhu		
2014	Kwatle Satisha	Sathish		
2014	Love in Mandya	Karna	Santhosham Award for Best Hero; Nominated, SIIMA Award for Best Actor (Kannada); Nominated, IIFA Utsavam Award for Best Actor (Kannada)	
2015	Muraari	Kavya's lover	Cameo appearance	
2015	Rocket	Rakesh	SIIMA Award for Best Actor (Critics)	
2016	Beautiful Manasugalu	Prashanth		
2016	Tiger Galli	Vishnu and Shiva	Dual role	
2018	Ayogya	Siddegowda	Filmfare Critics Award for Best Actor – Kannada; Nominated—City Cine Award for Best Actor – Kannada; Nominated—SIIMA Award for Best Actor in a Leading Role (Male) – Kannada; Nominated—Filmfare Award for Best Actor – Kannada	
2019	Chambal	Subhash		
2019	Brahmachari	Ramu		
2022	Dear Vikram	Vikram		
2022	Petromax	Shivappa		
2024	Matinee	Arun		
2026	The Rise of Ashoka	Ashoka		
2026	Ayogya 2	Siddegowda		
TBA	Pagaivanuku Arulvai †	TBA	Completed; Tamil film	
TBA	Dasara †	TBA	Filming	

=== As producer ===
List of films produced
Year	Film	Notes
2015	Rocket	
2016	Chowkabara	Won the State award for 'Best Short Film'
2017	Kaaji	
2022	Dear Vikram	
2022	Petromax	

=== As singer ===
List of songs
Year	Film	Song
2014	Anjada Gandu	"Anjada Gandu"
2015	Rocket	"Rangi Rangi"
2021	DNA	"Naavyaaru Yellinda"
2022	Album song	"Avva Kele"
2022	Album song	"Ashariravaani"
