= Kshetrapati (2023 film) =

2023 Kannada film

- Theatrical release poster
- Directed by: Shrikant Katagi
- Written by: Shrikant Katagi
- Produced by: Ashraga Creations
- Starring: Naveen Shankar; Archana Jois
- Cinematography: Y V B Shivasagar
- Edited by: Manu Shedgar
- Music by: Ravi Basrur
- Release date: 18 August 2023
- Country: India
- Language: Kannada

Kshetrapati is a 2023 Kannada-language feature film written and directed by Shrikanth Katagi. It stars Naveen Shankar, Archana Jois, Rahul Ainapur, and Harsh Arjun, with the main supporting cast including Achyuth Kumar, Krishna Hebbale, Shailashree Urs, Natya Ranga, and Sardar. The film was released on August 18, 2023.

== Plot ==
Basavaraj is an aspiring engineering student who dreams of working in the United States of America while in college he receives a call with devastating news from his family that his father who is a farmer committed suicide due to pressure from banks to pay his agricultural loans. Basavaraj takes up his father's profession drops out from his graduation and tries to make ends meet. He realizes that farmers get paid very little for their produce and the majority of the profit is devoured by corporate companies.

Local MLA is in favor of corporate companies and purchase the produce from the farmers with force and share the profits among their party. Escalating the issue to the Chief Minister still didn't resolve their problems.

The protagonist takes matters into his own hands and starts a revolution. He encourages farmers to sell their own produce rather than selling it to corporate companies. He seeks help from journalist Bhoomika played by Archana Jois, and shares their tactics on social media.

After an exchange of blows with the antagonist and Chief Minister they finally succeed in convincing the government to look after the farmers and pay them fairly

== Cast ==
- Naveen Shankar as Basavaraj Hadimani
- Archana Jois as Bhoomika
- Rahul Ainapur
- Harsh Arjun
- Achyuth Kumar as newspaper publisher
- Krishna Hebbale as a politician
- Shailashree Urs as Basavaraj's mother
- Natya Ranga as Basavaraj's friend
- Sardar

== Production ==
The film was shot in North Karnataka locations such as Gadag, Ilkal, Hubballi, and Dharwad. It portrays North Karnataka culture, cuisine, costume, and dialect.

== Reception ==
The Times of India gave a critic's rating of 3 out of 5. The Hindu mentions the movie as - "The Naveen Shankar-starrer, despite being well-intentioned, comes across like an uninspired soap opera". OTTPlay reviewed the movie to be over sentimental but to be well-meaningful.
