= Siddu Moolimani =

Indian actor

- Born: September 21, 1991 (age 35); Dharwad
- Occupation: Actor
- Years active: 2015–present
- Spouse: Priya J Achar

Siddu Moolimani (born Siddalingesh Neelappa Moolimani) is an Indian actor known for his work in Kannada films and television.

== Career ==
=== Early days and television ===
Siddu Moolimani was doing his diploma in computer science when he started working as a background dancer for Harsha Master. He was a finalist in the dance show Kick for which Shiva Rajkumar worked as a judge and Bharjari Comedy. He portrayed Preetham in the serial Paaru, which proved to be his breakthrough.

=== Films ===
His first film role was a cameo appearance in RangiTaranga (2015) and he subsequently played Yogesh's friend in Lambodara and Rishi's friend in Sarvajanikarige Suvarnavakasha (2022). He went on to star in many films including Vikrant Rona (2022) alongside Sudeep, O (2022), Dharani Mandala Madhyadolage (2022), Abhiramachandra (2023) as a cab driver from Mandya, Happy Birthday To Me (2024) as a 365-day tripper and Agnyathavasi (2025). His comedic roles in Abhiramachandra and Happy Birthday To Me were praised. Regarding his performance in Agnyathavasi, a critic wrote, "Siddu Moolimani adds the right amount of energy to his character Rohit, who is curious and shy, making him a relatable 90s youngster". He made his Tamil debut with Cold Call portraying a Tamil salesman from Bengaluru.

== Personal life ==
He got engaged to television actress Priya J Achar in November 2022 and married her on 13 February 2022.

== Filmography ==
- All films are in Kannada, unless otherwise noted.

Year	Title	Role	Notes
2015	RangiTaranga	Nilesh Gowda aka Pandu	
2017	Tora Tora	Manu	
2019	Lambodara	Dubsmash Danny	
2019	Sarvajanikarige Suvarnavakasha	Raghu	
2022	Vikrant Rona	Mohanchandra "Munna" Ballal	
2022	O	Chethan	
2022	Dhamaka	Siddu	
2022	Dharani Mandala Madhyadolage	Parachute	
2023	Chaos	Siddu	
2023	Abhiramachandra	Rama	
2024	Happy Birthday To Me	Tirumalesh aka Trippy	
2025	Agnyathavasi	Rohit	
2025	Love You Muddu	Karna	
2025	Cold Call	TBA	Tamil film

=== Television ===
Year	Title	Role	Network	Notes
2016	Kick	Contestant		Finalist
2017–2018	Bharjari Comedy	Contestant		Finalist
2018–2024	Paaru	Preetham	Zee Kannada	
	Dance Karnataka Dance	Contestant	Zee Kannada	
