= Abhiramachandra =

Indian Kannada-language romantic comedy film

- Theatrical release poster
- Directed by: Nagendra Ganiga
- Starring: Ratha Kiran; Siddu Moolimani; Natya Ranga
- Cinematography: Sandeep Valluri; Keertan Poojary
- Edited by: Suresh Arumugam
- Music by: Ravi Basrur
- Production company: AGS Productions
- Distributed by: Ravi Basrur Entertainment
- Release date: 6 October 2023
- Country: India
- Language: Kannada

Abhiramachandra is a 2023 Indian Kannada-language romantic comedy film directed by Nagendra Ganiga and starring Ratha Kiran, Siddu Moolimani and Natya Ranga in the titular roles.

== Cast ==
- Ratha Kiran as Abhi
- Siddu Moolimani as Rama
- Natya Ranga as Chandra
- Shivani Rai
- S. Narayan as Doctor
- Prakash Thuminad
- Sundar Veena
- Veena Sundar

== Music ==
The music was composed by Ravi Basrur.

Track listing
No.	Title	Lyrics	Singer(s)	Length
1.	"Yaro Yaro"	Kinnal Raj	Pancham Jeeva	4:30
2.	"Soul of Abhi"	Simple Suni	Santhosh Venky	1:18
3.	"Onti Payaniga"	Santhosh Venky	Vasuki Vaibhav	3:41
4.	"Oh My God Devare"	Nagendra Ganiga	Nagendra Ganiga	2:56
Total length:				12:25

== Reception ==
A critic from The New Indian Express rated the film 2.5/5 and wrote, "Abhi Rama Chandra is a heartwarming and relatable cinematic experience that beautifully captures the essence of love, friendship, and life’s unexpected twists". A critic from Bangalore Mirror wrote, "Abhiramachandra is a delightful watch for those searching for a romantic comedy with unexpected twists". A critic from The South First rated the film 2/5 stars and wrote, "Highly recommended to only those who are still curious as to how a four-lane love story can be embedded with such coincidences".
