= Tales of Mahanagara =

- Directed by: Rajeev Kiran Vaneil
- Screenplay by: Rajeev Kiran Vaneil; Atharv Vijay
- Story by: Atharv Vijay
- Produced by: Vijay kumar Gejjenada; Dharmendra Mahadev Rao
- Starring: Atharv Vijay; Ramola Shimoga; Sampath Maitreya vijaykumar
- Cinematography: Raushan Kumar Jha
- Edited by: Pradeep Gopal
- Music by: Siddharth Parashar
- Production company: Atharv Pictures
- Distributed by: Abhijit Enterprises
- Release date: 15 September 2023
- Country: India
- Language: Kannada

Tales of Mahanagara is a 2023 Indian Kannada-language Drama suspense thriller film directed by Rajeev Kiran Vaneil and produced by Vijay kumar Gejjenada along with Dharmendra Mahadev Rao under Atharv Pictures. The film stars Atharv Vijay and Ramola US. The music is composed by Siddharth Parashar, the cinematography is by Raushan Kumar Jha and the editing is handled by Pradeep Gopal. The movie revolves around six orphans from diverse backgrounds who unexpectedly meet in an apartment and find themselves in a tricky situation. Their efforts to break free and endure this perilous challenge constitute the essence of the movie.

Kiccha Sudeepa voiced the teaser which was released on 12 August. The trailer was released on 28 August 2023 and the film itself theatrically on 15 September 2023.

== Plot ==
Manu, a cab driver ends up falling for a north eastern medical student, Isha. Manu misinterprets Isha's personality during a hospital cab drop and chooses to keep his distance from her. Eventually, he unexpectedly encounters her again at a restaurant where she works as a waiter. After confrontation with Isha, Manu realises his misunderstanding and gradually falls in love with Isha.

The second tale revolves around Ravi and Siddha, two innocents who find themselves trapped in an illegal experiment run by a scientist to find whether his newly invented drug can rid the world of the need for sleep. Treated as lab rats in this experiment, Ravi and Siddha find a way to escape the experimental hall taking the scientist as hostage.

The third tale is of Sappe uncle, a former theatre artist whose method of acting led him to develop psychogenic erectile dysfunction and eventually lost the love of his life in the process. He now spends his days painting and Sleeping with escorts to forget the pain and humiliation caused by his past.

All three tales find themselves at a crossroads when all six people end up in the same abandoned apartment. Here they are taken hostage by Siddha and Ravi while the police surround the perimeter and threaten to come in by force to find the two who escaped from the experimental hall.

This standoff eventually leads to a sniper firing a gunshot that partially hits Ravi, causing Siddha to threaten Lilly at gunpoint so the police provide them the aid they need.

While negotiations are proceeding one of the police officers Vasudev realises that something is amiss with the whole situation and especially his senior police officers willingness to risk the lives of innocents in order to kill the two escapees.

With some clever investigation he realises that he needs to help the victims escape and plots a plan to get all the people out of the dangerous situation. With the help of Vasudev, Ravi and Sappe escape by disguising themselves as police officers, vasudev also helps Lilly and Isha to escape by distracting the police storming into the building. He informs Manu and Siddha that one of them has to stay upstairs so that the police do not get suspicious.

Unfortunately at this juncture, Manu manages to escape through an empty elevator shaft but Siddha is stuck and shot down by the bullet of the lead police officer, Rana.

Eventually the news of the police illegal experiment comes to light and those in the wrong are arrested. The five individuals now bonded by this harrowing experience find themselves eleven days later at the grave of the deceased Siddha and give their last rites.

== Cast ==
- Atharv Vijay as Manu
- Ramola US as Isha
- Sampath Maitreya as Siddha
- RJ ANoopa as Facebook Ravi
- Ashish Athawale as Sappe Uncle
- Vijay Venkatesh as Ranna
- Mahathi Vaishnavi Bhat as Nidhi
- Roopa Muthurayappa as Lilly
- B. Suresha as Guruji

== Reception ==
Tales of mahanagara was critically acclaimed and received positive response.

Reviewing Tales of Mahanagara for Bangalore Mirror, Y. Maheswara Reddy gave 3 stars from five, says Mirror of city life. The specialty of Tales of Mahanagara is that most of the actors are newcomers. Rajeev Kiran Vaneil, who debuts as a director, deserves a pat on the back for handling the megaphone with aplomb. Though the pre-intermission session is a bit of a drag, the post-intermission session keeps the audience glued to the screen. It is worth a watch, especially for those who want to encourage new talent in Sandalwood. in their review for udayavani from their team says A picture of Metropolis amid the surprises. All the big cities of the world also keep haundreds of secrets embedded in them. Tales of Mahanagara can be said to be an effort of new talent that can be supported.

== Soundtrack ==
Tales of Mahanagara

Soundtrack album by Siddharth Parashar
- Released: 2023
- Recorded: 2023
- Genre: Feature film soundtrack
- Language: Kannada
- Label: A2 Music

Official audio
- Tales Of Mahanagara - Full Album on YouTube

The music of the film is composed by Siddharth Parashar and released under A2 Music.

Track listing
No.	Title	Lyrics	Singer(s)	Length
1.	"Tu Jaan"	Chinmay Bhavikere	Keshav Anand	3:55
2.	"Idu Bengaluru Kananna"	Kiran, Chandan and Tejas	Gubbi	2:51
