= Vanchana =

Indian film

- Theatrical release poster
- Directed by: Umamahesh Marpu
- Written by: Umamahesh Marpu
- Produced by: Gowri Marpu
- Starring: Umamahesh Marpu; Sony Reddy; Surya (Telugu actor); RK Naidu; Diwakar Vankayala; Srinivas Chalam
- Cinematography: Bhaskar V. Satish
- Edited by: Guru Murty Hegde
- Music by: Vijetha Krishna
- Production company: Chandi Durga Entertainments
- Release date: 8 November 2024
- Running time: 117 minutes
- Country: India
- Language: Telugu

Vanchana is a 2024 Indian Telugu language legal drama film directed by Umamahesh Marpu.

== Plot ==
Vanchana tells the compelling story of a church father who passes away inexplicably, which results in the arrest of Chalam (Srinivas Rao), his driver. To defend Chalam, a committed criminal defense attorney named Krishna (Uma Mahesh) takes over and begins investigating the cause of the church father's death. Krishna discovers buried secrets during his investigation and comes to the realization that he knows who the true murderer is and why he was first hesitant to defend Chalam.

== Cast ==
- Umamahesh Marpu as Krishna
- Sony Reddy
- Surya
- RK Naidu as Andrew Joseph
- Diwakar Vankayala
- Srinivas Rao as Chalam

== Reception ==
Paul Nicodemus of The Times of India rated the film 2/5 stars and wrote, "Vanchana is a sincere attempt that balances storytelling with thought-provoking themes, making it a commendable debut for Umamahesh Marpu". Avad Mohammad rated the film 2.5/5 stars and wrote, "On the whole, Vanchana is a decent courtroom drama that has decent thrills". Kausalya Rachavelpula of The Hans India gave the film the same rating and wrote, "Vanchana is a thought-provoking story about a clever lawyer fighting for justice in a corrupt world".
