= Hondisi Bareyiri =

2023 Kannada film by Ramenahalli Jagannatha

- Directed by: Ramenahalli Jagannatha
- Written by: Prashanth Rajappa; Masti; Ramenahalli Jagannatha
- Screenplay by: Ramenahalli Jagannatha
- Story by: Ramenahalli Jagannatha
- Produced by: Sunday Cinemas
- Starring: Praveen Tej; Naveen Shankar; Shri Mahadev; Aishani Shetty; Bhavana Rao; Anirudh Acharya; Archana Jois
- Cinematography: Shanthi Sagar HG
- Edited by: Akshay P Rao
- Music by: Joe Costa
- Production company: Sunday Cinemas
- Release date: 10 February 2023
- Running time: 132 min
- Country: India
- Language: Kannada

Hondisi Bareyiri (transl.Match the following) is a 2023 Kannada romantic drama film written and directed by debutant Ramenahalli Jagannatha, produced by Sunday Cinemas. It features Praveen Tej, Naveen Shankar, Shri Mahadev, Aishani Shetty, Bhavana Rao, Anirudh Acharya and Archana Jois. The composer was Jose Costa and the cinematographer was Shanthi Sagar. Ramenahalli Jagannatha penned the dialogues with Prashanth Rajappa and Masti. The film was released on 10 April 2023. It received positive reviews from critics and audiences.

== Premise ==
A story of five engineering friends and life after college in a span of 12 years.

== Cast ==
- Praveen Tej as Jagan
- Naveen Shankar as Ranjit
- Aishani Shetty as Saniha Ponnappa
- Shri Mahadev as Kumar
- Bhavana Rao as Bhoomika
- Samyukta Hornad as Kavana
- Archana Jois as Pallavi
- Anirudh Acharya as Somashekar "Tiger Soma"
- Archana Kottige as Bhanu
- Cecilia Debbarama as Bamka Bazaar
- Hanumanthe Gowda as College Principal
- Mallikarjun Devaramane as Gurumurthy, professor
- Vidya Prabhu as Komala Madam
- Arjun A R as Parmesh, professor
- Suneel Puranik as Father of Sanniha
- Anatavelu as Ramanna
- Avinash Shatamarshan as Bhuvan, special appearance
- Sudha Narasimharaju as Somashekar's mother
- Dharmendra Urs as Kumar's father
- Praveen D. Rao as Kavana's father
- Yogesh Bhonsle
- Pallavi Raveendranath
- Hari Sharva

== Music ==
Hondisi Bareyiri

Soundtrack album by Joe Costa
- Released: 2023
- Recorded: 2021–2023
- Genre: Feature film soundtrack
- Length: 32:21
- Language: Kannada
- Label: Sunday Cinemas
- Producer: Joe Costa

Ramenahalli Jagannatha penned 7 songs. K. Kalyan and Hrudaya Shiva wrote the remaining songs. Joe Costa composed the music and released under Sunday Cinemas label in Youtube.

Track listing
No.	Title	Lyrics	Singer(s)	Length
1.	"Payanisive Manasugalu"	K. Kalyan	Nakul Abhyankar	4:14
2.	"Talaharate Maduthide Hrudaya"	Ramenahalli Jagannatha	Varun Ramachandra, Aishwarya Rangarajan, Pooja Rao	3:45
3.	"Goodu Toredaga"	Hrudaya Shiva	Siddarth Sunder	4:02
4.	"OH Kavana"	Ramenahalli Jagannatha	Adhitya R K	3:49
5.	"Bhavave Hogi Baa"	Ramenahalli Jagannatha	Siddarth Belmannu	4:45
6.	"Belakali"	Ramenahalli Jagannatha	Joe Costa	4:43
7.	"Soul of HB"	Ramenahalli Jagannatha	Aishwarya Rangarajan	1:20
8.	"Nee Irada Nale"	Ramenahalli Jagannatha	Keerthan Holla, Aishwarya Rangarajan	3:27
9.	"Nee Irada Nale (Reprise)"	Ramenahalli Jagannatha	Aishwarya Rangarajan	2:13
Total length:				32:21

== Release and reception ==
The film released on 9 February 2023 wide across Karnataka. Upon a successful theatrical run, it was released on Amazon Prime Video on 1 April. It was received well and garnered a viewership of 50 million minutes within a span of two months.
