= Archana Jois =

Indian actress

- Occupation: Actress
- Years active: 2015–present
- Spouse: Shreyas J Udupa

Archana Jois is an Indian actress who appears in Kannada films. Jois is known for her role as Shanthamma, Rocky's mother in K.G.F film series. She also received Karnataka State Film Award for Best Actress for her performance in the film #Mute (2022).

Apart from acting, she is also a trained Bharatanatyam dancer.

== Career ==
Archana Jois is one of the few Indian actresses to take up mother roles at a young age. She started her career with playing lead roles in television soaps Durga and Mahadevi. she played the second female lead in films such as Vijayaratha and the Marathi film Rajkumar.

She played one of the main leads in Hondisi Bareyiri (2023). She was then seen in the movie #Mute (2022). Despite winning a state award for the film, a critic from OTTplay rated the film 1.5/5 stars and called her performance "lacklustre". Her next films were Kshetrapthi (2023) and Ghost (2023) as a news reporter. She essayed an important role in the Ajay Rao-starrer Yuddhakaanda Chapter 2 (2025) directed by Pavan Bhat.

== Filmography ==
Year	Title	Role	Notes
2018	K.G.F: Chapter 1	Shanthamma	Winner–8th SIIMA Award for Best Supporting Actress (Kannada)
2019	Vijayaratha		
2021	Rajkumar	Rajkumar's girlfriend	Marathi film
2022	K.G.F: Chapter 2	Shanthamma	
2022	#Mute	Divya	Direct Release on Namma Flix; Winner - Karnataka State Film Award for Best Actress
2023	Hondisi Bareyiri	Pallavi	
2023	Kshetrapati	Bhoomika	
2023	Ghost	Lakshmi	
2025	Yuddhakaanda Chapter 2	Nivedita	
2026	Elra Kaaleliyatte Kaala	Dancer	Special appearance

=== Television ===
Year	Title	Role	Network	Notes	Refs.
2014	Thaka Dhimi Tha Dancing Star	Celebrity Contestant	Colors Kannada		
2015	Mahadevi	Tripura Sundari	Zee Kannada		
2016-2017	Durga		Star Suvarna		
2016	Mahamayi	Sundari	Zee Kannada		
2016	Neeli		Star Suvarna		
2018	Sri Vishnu Dasavatharam	Kayadu (Cameo)	Zee Kannada		
2023	Mansion 24	Radhika	Disney+Hotstar	Telugu series	
