= Ayogya (2018 film) =

- Promotional poster
- Directed by: S. Mahesh Kumar
- Written by: Maasthi Upparahalli Sharath Chakravarthy (Dialogues)
- Screenplay by: S. Mahesh Kumar
- Story by: S. Mahesh Kumar
- Produced by: T. R. Chandrashekar
- Starring: Sathish Ninasam; Rachita Ram
- Cinematography: Preetham Thegginamane
- Edited by: Suresh Arumugam
- Music by: Arjun Janya
- Production company: Crystal Park Cinemas
- Distributed by: Crystal Park Cinemas
- Release date: 17 August 2018
- Running time: 154 minutes
- Country: India
- Language: Kannada

Ayogya is a 2018 Indian Kannada romantic comedy film directed by debutante S. Mahesh Kumar and produced by Chandrashekar. It stars Sathish Ninasam and Rachita Ram in the lead along with P. Ravishankar, Chikkanna, Saritha, and Sadhu Kokila among others in key supporting roles. The music is scored by Arjun Janya and cinematography is by Preetham Thegginamane.

The film, based on a rural theme, was shot in and around Mandya district in Karnataka. It was released on 17 August 2018 across Karnataka, and received average reviews from critics. The Hindi dubbing rights was sold prior to the release of the film.

== Plot ==
Siddha always loafs around in the village. He falls in love with a girl, Nandini and Siddha ask his friend Shamanna for advice. The latter helps him too. Shamanna helps him without knowing that Siddha's love interest is none other than his own daughter Nandini while Siddha doesn't know that Nandini is Shamanna's daughter. Due to the dominance and other bad ways of Bachchegowda who has been the President of the Panchayat in his village for many years, Siddha decides to contest for the elections against him. Will this "fit for nothing" man win the elections? What will happen to his love? This is the rest of the story.

== Cast ==
- Sathish Ninasam as Siddhegowda "Siddha"
- Rachita Ram as Nandini
- P. Ravishankar as Bachchegowda
- Shivaraj K. R. Pete as Mutton
- Girish Shivanna as Benne
- Kuri Prathap as Smile Seena, Marriage Photographer
- Nikhil Manju
- Sadhu Kokila as Bhairathi Gundkal
- Saritha
- Aruna Balraj as Bhagyamma
- M. N. Lakshmi devi as Saakamma
- Nithanya as Soumya
- Prathibha
- Deepak Rajanna
- Tabla Nani as Holge
- Sundar Raj as Marriage Broker Shamanna
- Mohan Juneja as Election officer
- Daanappa Bagalkote
- Sai Mahesh
- Murali
- Escorts Srinivas
- Master Mahendra
- Master Puttaraju

== Soundtrack ==
Ayogya

Soundtrack album by Arjun Janya
- Released: 13 July 2018
- Recorded: 2018
- Genre: Film soundtrack
- Language: Kannada
- Label: Anand Audio
- Producer: Arjun Janya

Arjun Janya chronology
Kicchu (2018)	Ayogya (2018)	Ambi Ning Vayassaytho (2018)

Arjun Janya was brought in to compose the soundtrack and score for the film. This marks the first collaboration of Janya with actor Sathish Ninasam. Folk singer Anthony Daasan was hired to record the title track. Director-lyricist Chethan Kumar penned the lyrics for all the songs. The single "Yenammi Yenammi" video was officially released by actor Dhruva Sarja.

Tracklist
No.	Title	Lyrics	Singer(s)	Length
1.	"Enammi Enammi"	Chethan Kumar	Vijay Prakash, Palak Muchhal
2.	"Ayogya"	Chethan Kumar	Anthony Daasan
3.	"Hinde Hinde Hogu"	Chethan Kumar	Sanjith Hegde
4.	"Enee Karmakalaa"	Chethan Kumar	Sunil Gujagonda
5.	"Saakamma"	Sathish Ninasam	Arjun Janya

== Critical reception ==
Cinema Express wrote "Overall, with a rural backdrop that brings freshness, Ayogya is engaging, and keeps the audience in good spirits throughout". Times of India wrote "Debutant director Mahesh manages to impress in his first outing by churning a commercial potboiler with the right mix of comedy, catchy dialogues and action to make a it a perfect weekend watch".
