= Sonu Gowda =

Indian actress

- Born: Shruthi Ramakrishna; Bangalore, Karnataka, India
- Occupation: Actress
- Years active: 2008–present

Sonu Gowda is an Indian actress who works predominantly in Kannada-language films. She made her debut in Inthi Ninna Preethiya and appeared in films including Paramesha Panwala and Gulama. She has also starred in Tamil and a few Malayalam films, where she is credited as Shruthi Ramakrishnan.

== Personal life ==
Sonu was born to Ramakrishna, a make-up artist who has worked in the Kannada film industry. She has a sister, Neha Gowda, who is a television actress known for her roles in the Telugu television drama series Swathi Chinukulu, the Kannada soap opera Lakshmi Baramma, and the Tamil soap opera Kalyana Parisu. Sonu studied at Carmel High School, Padhmanabhanagar, Bangalore.

== Career ==
Sonu's first film was Inthi Ninna Preethiya (2008), where she worked alongside actor Srinagar Kitty. She has gone on to appear in many films like Gultoo, Happy New Year, and 1 by Two. Sonu is also part of WeMove Theatre, a popular Bangalore-based theatre company.

== Filmography ==
=== Films ===
Key
†	Denotes films that have not yet been released

Year	Film	Role	Language	Notes
2008	Inthi Ninna Preethiya	Namana	Kannada	
2008	Paramesha Panwala	Lakshmi	Kannada	
2009	Gulama	Priyanka	Kannada	
2009	Raam		Kannada	Cameo
2010	Police Quarters	Anitha	Kannada	
2010	Sivappu Mazhai	Nurse	Tamil	
2010	Best Actor	Savithri	Malayalam	
2011	Doubles	Dr. Beena	Malayalam	Cameo
2011	Aanmai Thavarael	Yamuna	Tamil	
2013	Dyavre	Shruthi Kalappa	Kannada	
2014	Amara	Thenmozhi	Tamil	
2014	1 by Two	Meghna	Malayalam	
2015	Goa	Casino owner	Kannada	
2015	Viraivil Isai	Lekha	Tamil	
2015	144	Divya	Tamil	
2016	Kiragoorina Gayyaligalu	Nagamma	Kannada	
2016	Half Mentlu	Madhu	Kannada	
2016	Narathan	Sowmya	Tamil	
2016	Asthitva		Kannada	
2016	Kavalai Vendam	Shilpa / Sundaram	Tamil	
2017	Happy New Year	Suma	Kannada	
2017	Maarikondavaru		Kannada	
2018	Gultoo	Pooja / Anagha	Kannada	
2018	Kanoorayana	Gowri	Kannada	
2018	Enga Kattula Mazhai	Mageshwari	Tamil	
2018	Onthara Bannagalu	Janaki	Kannada	
2019	Fortuner	Anusha	Kannada	
2019	Chambal	Lakshmi	Kannada	
2019	I Love You	Gowri	Kannada	
2019	50/50	Madhu	Tamil	
2021	Yuvarathnaa	Deeksha	Kannada	
2021	Drishya 2	Advocate Renuka	Kannada	
2022	Ente Mazha		Malayalam	
2022	Dear Vikram		Kannada	Extended cameo
2022	Wedding Gift	Akanksha	Kannada	
2022	Ward 126	Swapna	Tamil	
2023	Marichi	Mouna	Kannada	
2023	Aghori		Tamil	
2025	Nodidavaru Enanthare	Ex-lover	Kannada	Cameo appearance
2025	Sidlingu 2	Niveditha	Kannada	

=== Television ===
Year	Title	Role	Channel	Notes
2022	Jothe Jotheyali	Rajanandhini	Zee Kannada	

== Awards and nominations ==
Film	Award	Result	Ref.
Kiragoorina Gayyaligalu	Filmfare Award for Best Supporting Actress – Kannada	Won	
Gultoo	Filmibeat Award for Best Actress - Kannada	Won	
Gultoo	City Cine Award for Best Actress - Kannada	Won	
Gultoo	SIIMA Award for Best Actor in a Leading Role- (Female) -Kannada	Won	
