= List of Kannada films of 2018 =

A list of Kannada language films produced in the Kannada film industry in India in 2018.

== Box office collection ==
The highest-grossing Kannada films released in 2018, by worldwide box office gross revenue, are as follows.

The rank of the films in the following depends on the worldwide gross. The budget is only for knowledgeable purpose.

Highest worldwide gross of 2018
Rank	Title	Production company	Worldwide gross	Ref
1	KGF: Chapter 1	Hombale Films	₹250 crore (US$26 million)	
2	The Villain	Tanvi Shanvi Films	₹60 crore (US$6.2 million)	
3	Tagaru	Venus Entertainers	₹53 crore (US$5.5 million)	
4	Raambo 2	Ladoo Cinema House De Arte Studios	₹27 crore (US$2.8 million)	
5	Sarkari Hi. Pra. Shaale	Rishab Shetty Films	₹20 crore (US$2.1 million)	
6	Ambi Ning Vayassaytho	Kichcha Creations	₹10 crore (US$1.0 million)	
7	Ayogya	Crystal Park Cinemas	₹5 crore (US$520,000)	
8	Dandupalya 3	SRT Entertainers	₹4.5 crore (US$470,000)	
9	Victory 2	Tharun Talkies	₹3.5 crore (US$360,000)	

== Film awards events ==
- 65th National Film Awards
- 2017 Karnataka State Film Awards
- 65th Filmfare Awards South
- 7th South Indian International Movie Awards
- Suvarna Film Awards, by Suvarna channel.
- Udaya Film Awards, by Udaya Channel
- Bengaluru International Film Festival
- Bangalore Times Film Awards

== January–June ==
Opening		Title	Director	Cast	Notes	Ref
J A N U A R Y	5	Brihaspathi	Nanda Kishore	Manoranjan Ravichandran, Mishti Chakraborthy, Saikumar, Sithara	Remake of Tamil film Velaiilla Pattadhari (2014); Produced by Rockline Entertainments	
J A N U A R Y	5	Nammavaru	Purushottam Omkarswamy	Srinivasa Murthy, Ramesh Bhat, Ganesh Rao, Jayalakshmi	Produced by Ataveshwara Films	
J A N U A R Y	5	Punararambha	Vijaya Kumar	Vijaya Kumar, Aishwarya Dinesh, Shankar Ashwath, Ganesh Rao	Produced by Vibhin Creations	
J A N U A R Y	5	Punarapi	Lingaraj P. Bellary	Raj Charan, Pallavi, Ritesh Nagaraj, Sudhiksha Ramesh		
J A N U A R Y	12	Humble Politician Nograj	Saad Khan	Danish Sait, Vijay Chendoor, Sumukhi Suresh, Roger Narayan, Sruthi Hariharan	Produced by Paramvah Studios, Pushkar Films & Lost and Found Films	
J A N U A R Y	12	Mari Tiger	P. N. Sathya	Vinod Prabhakar, Teju, Neethu, Bullet Prakash	Produced by Simhadri Productions	
J A N U A R Y	19	3 Gante 30 Dina 30 Second	G. K. Madhusudhan	Aru Gowda, Kavya Shetty, Devaraj, Sudharani, Yamuna Srinidhi, Sundar	Produced by Brain Share Creations Private Limited	
J A N U A R Y	19	Neenillada Male	Amosh	R. Janardhan, Vallery Maravi, Girish Karnad, Tabla Nani	Produced by Laxmi Movies and Maas Movies	
J A N U A R Y	19	Raju Kannada Medium	Naresh Kumar	Gurunandan, Avantika Shetty, Ashika Ranganath, Achyuth Kumar, Anjelina Desdena, Sudeep (cameo role)	Produced by Suresh Arts	
J A N U A R Y	26	Churikatte	Raghu Shivamogga	Praveen Tej, Prerana Kambam, Achyuth Kumar, Sharath Lohitashwa, Balaji Manohar, Manjunath Hegde	Produced by Morning Star Pictures	
J A N U A R Y	26	I Dash You	Keshav Chandu	Pramod, Lucky, Suvarna, Kalyani	Produced by Kavi Hrudaya Talkies	
J A N U A R Y	26	Kanaka	R. Chandru	Duniya Vijay, Hariprriya, Manvitha Harish, Rangayana Raghu, Sadhu Kokila		
F E B R U A R Y	2	Aa Ondu Dina	Sanjay	Badami, Vijay Desai, Raj Bahaddur, Simran Mishra Koti, Alisha	Produced by Kumar Samarth Creations	
F E B R U A R Y	2	Devrantha Manushya	Kiran Shetty	Pratham, Shruthi, Vaishnavi Menon, Suchendra Prasad, Tabla Nani	Produced by Suravi Combines and Sahith Films	
F E B R U A R Y	2	Jantar Mantar	Govinde Gowda	Shivaraj K.R.Pete, Nayana, Divyasri, Hitesh, Sambrama, Master Anand, V. Manohar	Produced by Sri Huliyamma Movie Makers	
F E B R U A R Y	2	Java	Abhay Chandra Gowda	Saikumar, Dileep Raj, Bhavani Prakash, Nagini Bharana	Produced by Blue Aubrey Entertainment Pvt Ltd.	
F E B R U A R Y	2	Manjari	Vishruth Naik	Roopika, Amith, Prabhu Mandukar, Vijay Chendoor	Produced by Shankara Combines	
F E B R U A R Y	2	Rajasimha	Ravi Ram	Aniruddha Jatkar, Nikita Thukral, Sanjjana, Bharathi Vishnuvardhan, Sharath Lohitashwa, Bullet Prakash	Produced by Veer Maasti Films	
F E B R U A R Y	2	Sanjeeva	Sri Panchami Cine Creations	Chethan Gandharva, Lekha Chandra, Achyuth Kumar, Chikkanna, Sadhu Kokila	Produced by Sri Panchami Cine Creations	
F E B R U A R Y	9	Amalu	L. Ravi Kumar	Bhanu Prakash, M. D. Kowshik	Produced by	
F E B R U A R Y	9	Naanu L/O Jaanu	Suresh. G	Vishal Dantha, Manjula Gangappa, Chikkanna, Suchendra Prasad	Produced by Shri Kalathapasvi Creations	
F E B R U A R Y	9	Prema Baraha	Arjun Sarja	Chandan Kumar, Aishwarya Arjun, Prakash Raj, Suhasini Maniratnam, K. Vishwanath, Arjun Sarja	Simultaneously released in Tamil as Solli Vidava; Produced by Sree Raam Films International	
F E B R U A R Y	9	Raghuveera	Surya Sathish	Harsha, Dhenu Achappa, Swaminathan, Robo Ganesh, Mythri Jagadish	Produced by Achappa Movies	
F E B R U A R Y	9	Real Real 2	Kavi Rajesh	Prajwal, Kavya Gowda, Soujanya	Produced by Megha Varsha Movies	
F E B R U A R Y	9	Samhaara	Guru Deshpande	Chiranjeevi Sarja, Hariprriya, Kavya Shetty, Chikkanna, Tabla Nani	Remake of Tamil film Adhe Kangal (2017); Produced by Manu Enterprises	
F E B R U A R Y	16	Googal	V. Nagendra Prasad	V. Nagendra Prasad, Shubha Poonja, Amrutha Rao, Deepak	Produced by Utsav Movies	
F E B R U A R Y	16	Jana Gana Mana	Shashikanth Anekal	Ayesha Habib, Ravi Kale, Ramakrishna, Raghunath Yadav	Produced by VIP Cinemas	
F E B R U A R Y	16	Kantri Boys	S. Raju Chatnally	Gaddappa, Aravind, Sumanth Surya, Darshan Raj, Sandhya, Shalini, Anakha, Vasanthi	Produced by Cherains Entertainment	
F E B R U A R Y	16	Mr. LLB	Raghuvardhan Shravana	Shishir Shastry, Lekha Chandra, Sujay Hegde, Nandini, Kempegowda	Produced by RV Creations	
F E B R U A R Y	16	Shankhanada	Vishwanatha Basappa Kalagi	Shanthareddy Patil, Nayana, Srinivasa, Sri Rashmitha	Produced by Sri Siddarameshwara Films	
F E B R U A R Y	16	Tunturu	Mussanje Mahesh	Ramesh Aravind, Anu Prabhakar, Rishika Singh, Anil	Produced by Thibbadevi Enterprises	
F E B R U A R Y	23	Dvaita	Sadashivachar	Prasad Vasishta, Shrithama, Chandrakala Mohan	Produced by	
F E B R U A R Y	23	Gande Oorige Hodaga	Sai Krishna	Sindhu Rao, Anu Gowda, Sapna	Produced by	
F E B R U A R Y	23	Rangbirangi	Mallikarjun Muthalagerigenre	Tanvi Rao, Sreejith, Panchu, Charan, Kuri Pratap, Satyajith, Babu Hirannaiah, Rockline Sudhakar	Produced by SK Talkies	
F E B R U A R Y	23	Rankal Raate	Gopi Kerur	Mana Advik, Ashriya, Ravi, Yashas	Produced by Cinema Krushi Movies	
F E B R U A R Y	23	Tagaru	Duniya Soori	Shiva Rajkumar, Dhananjay, Manvitha, Bhavana, Vasishta N. Simha, Devaraj, Suhasini Maniratnam	Produced by Venus Entertainers	
M A R C H	2	3000	Rabbuni Keerthi	Keerthi, M. D. Prasad, Clarence Allen Crasta, Ujala Baboria, Pallavi Sagar	Produced by Shankar & associates	
M A R C H	2	Chinnada Gombe	Pankaj Baalan	Century Gowda, Gaddappa, Keerthi Krishna, Leena Kushi, Anji Shri	Produced by Sri Krishna Movie Makers	
M A R C H	2	Preethiya Raayabhari	M. M. Muthu	Nakul Gowda, Sukruta Deshpande, Charan Raj, Sadhu Kokila, Suchendra Prasad	Produced by Naadakirana Pictures	
M A R C H	2	Sarkaar	Manju Preetham	Jaguar Jaggi, Lekha Chandra	Produced by Sri Veerabhadreshwara Entertainment	
M A R C H	16	Dandupalya 3	Srinivas Raju	Pooja Gandhi, Makarand Deshpande, P. Ravishankar, Sanjjana, Ravi Kale, Adi Lokesh, Petrol Prasanna	Produced by SRT Entertainments Pvt Ltd	
M A R C H	16	Idam Premam Jeevanam	Raghavanka Prabhu	Sanath, Shanaya Katwe, Siri Raju, Avinash	Produced by Riona Productions	
M A R C H	16	Muttina Pallakki	M. D. Kaushik	Gauthami Gowda, Randhir Kamalakar, Sundar Raj	Produced by Global Man Productions	
M A R C H	16	Nanagishta	Dinesh Babu	Ashwin Devang, Rachana, Rajesh Nataranga	Produced by Sri Lakshmivenkateshwara Visions	
M A R C H	16	O Premave	Manoj Kumar	Manoj Kumar, Nikki Galrani, Sadhu Kokila, Rangayana Raghu, Huccha Venkat	Produced by M K Films	
M A R C H	23	Athruptha	Nagesh Kyalanur	Arjun Yogesh Raj, Shruthi Raj, Sihi Kahi Chandru, Sihi Kahi Geetha	Produced by Jaithashri Pictures	
M A R C H	23	Mukhyamantri Kaldodnappo	Shivakumar Badriah	Bharath Badriah, Amulya Raj, Shivakumar Badriah	Produced by Bale Yele Film Productions	
M A R C H	23	Rajaratha	Anup Bhandari	Nirup Bhandari, Arya, Avantika Shetty, P. Ravishankar	Produced by Jollyhits	
M A R C H	23	Saakshi	Prasad P. J.	Nakul Govind, Sheela Rai	Produced by Master Frames	
M A R C H	23	Yogi Duniya	Hari	Yogesh, Vasishta N. Simha, Hitha Chandrashekar	Produced by MY Film Factory & Balaji Cinema	
M A R C H	30	Gultoo	Janardhan Chikkanna	Naveen Shankar, Sonu Gowda, Rangayana Raghu, Pawan Kumar, Avinash	Produced by Vivid Films	
M A R C H	30	Heegondhu Dina	Vikram Yoganand	Sindhu Lokanath, Praveen Tej, Guruprasad, Shobaraj	Produced by Smart Screen Productions	
M A R C H	30	Ideega Banda Suddhi	S. R. Patil	Maadhav, Kaavya, Shivakumar, Balaram Kannadiga	Produced by Basava Combines	
M A R C H	30	Johnny Johnny Yes Papa	Preetham Gubbi	Duniya Vijay, Rachita Ram, Rangayana Raghu, Sadhu Kokila, Achyuth Kumar	Produced by Duniya Talkies	
A P R I L	6	Andhagaara	Jayakumar	Naveen Theerthahalli, Sowmya Gowda, Nandish, Jithendra Kumar	Produced by Sri Kuppamma Devi Movies, ARK Media	
A P R I L	6	Huccha 2	Om Prakash Rao	Darling Krishna, Shravya Rao, Saikumar, Malavika Avinash, Sadhu Kokila	Remake of Raam (2005); Produced by Sri Renuka Movie Makers	
A P R I L	6	Jayamahal	Hrudaya Shiva	Shubha Poonja, Neenasam Ashwath, Kausalya, Hrudaya Shiva	Produced by S S Creations	
A P R I L	6	Maduve Dibbana	S. Umesh	Abhishek, Sonal Monteiro, Shivaraj KR Pete	Produced by BNR Films	
A P R I L	6	Nanjundi Kalyana	Rajendra Karanth	Thanush Shivanna, Shravya Rao, Kuri Prathap, Padmaja Rao	Produced by Srirama Talkies	
A P R I L	6	UN2	Nithesh G. R.	Nithesh G. R., Anitha Bhat, Manoj Mishra	Produced by SSD Movies	
A P R I L	6	Varthamana	Umesh Amshi	Sanchari Vijay, Sanjana Prakash	Produced by Ultimate Movies	
A P R I L	13	Dalapathi	Prashant Raj	Prem Kumar, Kriti Kharbanda, Krishi Thapanda, Chikkanna, Sharath Lohitashwa	Produced by Nimma Cinema	
A P R I L	13	Mercury	Karthik Subbaraj	Prabhu Deva, Sananth Reddy, Remya Nambeesan, Deepak Paramesh, Shashank Purushotham, Anish Padmanabhan, Indhuja	Produced by Stone Bench Films	
A P R I L	13	Seizer	Vinay Krishna	Chiranjeevi Sarja, V. Ravichandran, Parul Yadav, Prakash Rai, Nagineedu, Sadhu Kokila	Produced by Sree Kadari Lakshmi Narasimha Swamy Productions	
A P R I L	20	6 to 6	Shidlughatta Srinivas	Tarak Ponnappa, Aarohi, Swaroopini, Suresh Heblikar	Produced by Annapoorneshwari Arts	
A P R I L	20	Attempt to Murder	Amar Gowda	Chandu Gowda, Soorya, Shobitha, Hemalatha. V, Vinay H. S.	Produced by Renukamba Digital Theater	
A P R I L	20	Krishna Tulasi	Sukhesh Nayak	Sanchari Vijay, Meghashree, Tabla Nani, Ramesh Bhat	Produced by Annapoorneshwari Cine Creations	
A P R I L	20	Nagavalli Vs Apthamithraru	Shankar Arun	Vikram Karthik, Vaishnavi Menon	Produced by Prabhik Media Works	
A P R I L	20	Rukku	Basavaraj Bellary	Shreyas, Vega Ramya	Produced by	
A P R I L	20	Saaguva Daariyalli	Shiv Kumar Gowda	Anup SaRa Govind, Pavithra Gowda, Devaraj, Sharath Lohitashwa, Rangayana Raghu	Produced by Shiva Shakti Movie Dreams	
A P R I L	27	Buckasura	Navaneeth Kumar	RJ Rohith, Kavya Gowda, V. Ravichandran, Shashikumar, Makarand Deshpande, Sithara	Produced by Padmavathi Pictures	
A P R I L	27	Days of Borapura	Aditya Kunigal	Prashanth C. M., Anitha Bhat, Surya Siddhartha, Suchendra Prasad	Produced by	
A P R I L	27	Dhwaja	Ashok Cashyap	Ravi Gowda, Priyamani, T. N. Seetharam, Tabla Nani, Divya Uruduga	Remake of Tamil film Kodi (2016); Produced by C. B. G Production	
A P R I L	27	Hebbet Ramakka	N. R. Nanjunde Gowda	Tara, Devaraj, Hanumanthe Gowda	Produced by Saviraj Cinemas	
A P R I L	27	Kanoorayana	T. S. Nagabharana	Skanda Ashok, Sonu Gowda, Doddanna, Kaddipudi Chandru	Produced by Shruthalaya Films	
M A Y	4	Bhootayyana Mommaga Ayyu	Nagaraj Peenya	Chikkanna, Sruthi Hariharan, Bullet Prakash, Tabla Nani, Honnavalli Krishna	Produced by Sri Vaishnavi Cine Creations	
M A Y	4	Kicchu	Pradeep Raj	Dhruva Sharma, Ragini Dwivedi, Abhinaya, Suchendra Prasad, Saikumar, Sudeep	Produced by Indirajal Advertisement Solutions	
M A Y	11	Edakallu Guddada Mele	Vivin Surya	Nakul Sharma, Swathi Sharma, Pragathi Hemakala, Bharathi Vishnuvardhan, Sihi Kahi Chandru, Sumithra	Produced by Sri Sai Siddhi Productions	
M A Y	11	Hello Mama	Mohan Shankar	Mohan Shankar, Bhumika A. K.	Produced by Pragathi Cine Creations	
M A Y	18	Parthasarathi	Robert Navaraj	Renukumar, Akshatha Sreedhar Shastry	Produced by Digital Pixll	
M A Y	18	Raambo 2	Anil Kumar	Sharan, Ashika Ranganath, Chikkanna, Tabla Nani, P. Ravishankar	Produced by Laddoo Cinemas and De Arte Studios	
M A Y	18	Saddu	Arun	Bharath, Nikitha Swamy, Bhagya	Produced by Tasha Productions	
M A Y	25	Hottegagi Genu Battegagi	Narendra Babu	Ananth Nag, Radhika Chetan	Produced by Acme Movies International	
M A Y	25	Raja Loves Radhe	Rajashekar	Vijay Raghavendra, Radhika Preeti, Rakesh Adiga, Shubha Poonja, P. Ravishankar, Bhavya, Mithra, Tabla Nani	Produced by H.L.N. Raj Entertainer	
M A Y	25	Ramadhanya	T. N. Nagesh	Yashas Surya, Nimika Ratnakar, Mandya Ramesh, Yash Ninasam, Ramesh Pandit	Produced by Dashamukha Ventures	
M A Y	25	Yar Yaro Gori Mele	L. V. Raghuchand	Raaj, Abhi, Varsha	Produced by Mathru Krupa Communication	
J U N E	1	2nd Half	Yogi Devagange	Priyanka Upendra, Sharath Lohitashwa, Niranjan Sudhindra, Surabhi Santhosh	Produced by Brindavan Enterprises	
J U N E	1	Adarsha	Sai Prabhakar	Naga Kiran, Prajju Poovaiah, Taranga Vishwanath	Produced by SBR Pictures	
J U N E	1	Bicycle Boys	Naveena S. Kumar	Abhishek Acharya, Navitha Jain	Produced by Sreekara Creations	
J U N E	1	J	K. Harish	K. Harish, Veena	Produced by KP Company	
J U N E	1	Navila Kinnari	Venky Challa	Himansee Katragadda, Hulikal Nataraj, Srinivas Prabhu, Baby Deekshitha	Produced by Hulikal Entertainment Studios	
J U N E	1	Vanilla	Jayatheertha	Avinash J, Swathi Konde, Pavana	Produced by Akhila Combines	
J U N E	8	Shathaya Gathaya	Sandeep Gowda	Raghu Ramappa, Sonika Gowda, Kuri Prathap, Govinde Gowda, M. S. Umesh	Produced by Alphaa Pictures	
J U N E	8	Shivu Paru	America Suresh	America Suresh, Disha Poovaiah, Chitra Shenoy, Ramesh Bhat, Honnavalli Krishna, Tharanga Vishwa	Produced by Suri Film	
J U N E	15	Amma I Love You	K. M. Chaitanya	Chiranjeevi Sarja, Nishvika Naidu, Sithara, Chikkanna, Prakash Belawadi	Remake of Tamil film Pichaikkaran (2016); Produced by Dwarakish Chitra	
J U N E	15	Kattu Kathe	Raj Praveen	Surya, Swathi Konde, Rajesh Nataranga, Mithra	Produced by Anagha Productions	
J U N E	15	Megha Alias Maggi	Vishal Puttanna	Tej Gowda, Sukrutha Wagle, Neethu Bala	Produced by Vinni Creations	
J U N E	22	1098	N. A. Shwetha	Preetham, Ayush, Thoshith, Gowri, Milana, Sharadamma, Punish, Pavan	Produced by Lakshmi Narasimha Film Factory & Sambrama Dream House	
J U N E	22	Aranyakanda	Raghunandan. S	Amar, Archana Kottige, Gururaj Shetty, Pawan Damodar, Ayush	Produced by Lakshmi Narasimha Film Factory & Sambrama Dream House	
J U N E	22	Kelavu Dinagala Nanthara	Sri Ni	Shubha Poonja, Dravya Shetty, Lokesh, Pawan	Produced by Sri Kalpavruksha Combines	
J U N E	22	Mast Kalandar	Rajkumar Aditthyaa	Nithin, Aarohi	Produced by Swamy Film Productions	
J U N E	22	Mr. Cheater Ramachari	Ramachari	Ramachari, Shalini Bhat, Ramanjaneyulu, Vijay Chowdhary	Produced by Runway Reel	
J U N E	22	Surya Eva Vrukshamitra	Annaiah. P	Abdul Salmaan, Chandrakala Mohan, Ramesh Pandit, Ramesh Bhat		
J U N E	29	*121#	Dosti V Anand	Vinay Chandar, Vidya Virsh, Naveen Kumar Gowda, Ugramm Manju	Produced by Nekara Cine Enterprises	
J U N E	29	Chitte	M. L. Prasanna	Yashas Surya, Harshika Poonacha, B. M. Giriraj	Produced by Sri Vagdevi Creations and S. Nalige Productions	
J U N E	29	Hyper	Ganesh Vinayak	Arjun Aarya, Sheela, Rangayana Raghu, Bullet Prakash	Produced by M Big Pictures	
J U N E	29	Kulfi	Manju Hassan	Dilip, Sinol	Produced by AMS Productions	
J U N E	29	V2	Bhayanaka Naga; Krishna Nag	Bhayanaka Naga, Krishna Nag	Produced by Kiran Creations	

== July–December ==
Opening		Title	Director	Cast	Notes	Ref
J U L Y	6	6ne Maili	Seeni	Sanchari Vijay, Krishna Hebbale, Mythri Jaggi, Dr. Janvi Jyothi, RJ Nethra, RJ Sudhesh	Produced by Sri Nagabrahma Creations	
J U L Y	6	Asathoma Sadgamaya	Rajesh Venoor	Radhika Chetan, Kiran Raj, Lasya Nagaraj, Deepak Shetty	Produced by ICare Movies	
J U L Y	6	Dhangadi	Sidram Karnik	Surendra Ugare, Kanaka Lakshmi	Produced by Parameshwari Arts	
J U L Y	6	Kannadakkaagi Ondannu Otti	Kushal Gowda	Avinash Shatamarshana, Krishi Thapanda, Chikkanna, Rangayana Raghu, Suchendra Prasad	Produced by Edabidangi Talkies	
J U L Y	6	Kuchiku Kuchiku	D. Rajendra Babu	Jayram Karthik, Praveen Tej, Nakshatra, Bhuvann Ponnannaa	Produced by Cheluvarayaswami Movies	
J U L Y	13	Aa Karaala Ratri	Dayal Padmanabhan	Jayram Karthik, Anupama Gowda, Rangayana Raghu, Veena Sundar	Produced by D Pictures	
J U L Y	13	Atharva	Arun	Pavan Teja, Sanam Shetty, Yash Shetty, Rangayana Raghu	Produced by Mahasimha Movies	
J U L Y	13	Double Engine	Chandra Mohan	Chikkanna, Suman Ranganathan, H. G. Dattatreya, Sadhu Kokila, Prabhu Mundkur, Priyanka Malnad, Achyuth Kumar	Produced by SRS Group	
J U L Y	13	Hasiru Ribbon	H. S. Venkateshamurthy	B. Jayashree, Girija Lokesh, Nikhil Manju, Supriya, Chaitra	Produced by Nisarga Creations	
J U L Y	13	Love U2	Just BK	Pavan Kumar, Raghu Bhat, Keerthi Lakshmi, Kempegowda		
J U L Y	13	MMCH	Mussanje Mahesh	Ragini Dwivedi, Meghana Raj, Samyukta Hornad, Prathama Prasad, Nakshatra, Yuvaraj, Raghu Bhat	Produced by Aishwarya Film Productions	
J U L Y	13	Trunk	Rishika Sharma	Nihal Rajput, Vaishali Deepak, Aruna Balraj	Produced by Anvitha Creations	
J U L Y	20	Keechakaru	Shivamani. G	Shivamani G., Sheela, Ugram Reddy	Produced by Sheetal Cine Creations	
J U L Y	20	Naagarahaavu (Re-release)	Puttanna Kanagal	Vishnuvardhan, Aarathi, Ambareesh, K. S. Ashwath, Shubha, Leelavathi, Jayanthi, Shivaram	Produced by Eshwari Productions	
J U L Y	20	Navodaya Dayzz	Jaikumar Manju	Gaurish Akki, Chandrika Awasthi, Hemanth Srinivas, Sagar, Karthik Vaibhav	Produced by Sri Nandi Film Factory, Srinandi, Raghukumar, Deepak	
J U L Y	20	Nee Nanna Usiru	Sunil; Anil	Ajay Kumar, Pallavi Lokesh	Produced by Kannada Creations	
J U L Y	20	Samartha	K. S. Govinda Raju	Ravi Siror, Rachana Dashrath	Produced by Sarva Creations	
J U L Y	27	Ayyo Rama	R. Vinod Kumar	Sheshan Padmanabhan, Priyanka Suresh, M. S. Jahangir, Rockline Sudhakar	Produced by SK Films	
J U L Y	27	Mogambo	Alankar	Arjun Mahadev, Rishita Malnad, Radhika, Mandya Jayaram	Produced by Amma Venus Films	
J U L Y	27	Prayanikara Gamanakke	Manohar	Bharath Sarja, Lokesh, Amitha Ranganath, Deepak Shetty, Girish	Produced by Srushti Enterprises	
J U L Y	27	Sankashtakara Ganapathi	Arjun Kumar S	Likhith Shetty, Shruthi Goradia, Achyuth Kumar, Manjunath Hegde	Produced by Dynamite Films	
A U G U S T	3	Katheyondu Shuruvagide	Senna Hegde	Diganth, Pooja Devariya, Shreya Anchan, Babu Hirannaiah	Produced by Paramvah Studios	
A U G U S T	3	Kumari 21F	Sriman Vemula	Pranam Devaraj, Nidhi Kushalappa, Apoorva Gowda, Ravi Kale	Remake of Telugu film Kumari 21F (2015); Produced by Shri Hayagriva Kala Chitra	
A U G U S T	3	Statement	Appi Prasad	Ramachandran Nair, Manoj. G, Karthik Vaibhav, Radha Ramachandra		
A U G U S T	3	Summer Holidays	Kavitha Lankesh	Esha Lankesh, Samarjit Lankesh, Sonia Hegde, Anish Angre	Produced by Esha Lankesh Productions	
A U G U S T	3	Theory	Pavan Shankar	Deepak Gowda, Tejaswini, Yadushreshtha		
A U G U S T	3	Vaasu Naan Pakka Commercial	Ajithvasan Uggina	Anish Tejeshwar, Nishvika Naidu, Avinash, Aruna Balraj, Manjunath Hegde	Produced by Winkwhistle Productions	
A U G U S T	10	Abhisarike	A. S. Madhusudhan	Tej, Sonal Monteiro, Yash Shetty, Chandrakala Mohan, Ashok Raj	Produced by Bhagyalakshmi Productions & Vision Cinemas	
A U G U S T	10	Arkavath	Hemanth Kumar	Ramesh Pandit, Asha Shetty, Shivakumar Aradhya, Nataraj, Abhijith Shetty	Produced by Hemanth Productions	
A U G U S T	10	Hosa Climax	Dr. Shally	Naresh Gandhi, Anitha Bhat, Dr. Shally, M. D. Kaushik	Produced by Shally Konark International	
A U G U S T	10	Kathale Kone	Sandesh Shetty Ajri	Sandesh Shetty Ajri, Hanika Rao, Vaishak Amin, Rithik Murudeshwar, Ashwath Acharya, Chithrakala Rajesh	Produced by Thasmay Productions	
A U G U S T	10	Loudspeaker	Shiva Tejas	Abhishek Jain, Anusha Rodrigues, Kavya Shah, Ninasam Bhaskar, Sumanth Bhat, Disha Dinakar, Rangayana Raghu, Prakash Thuminad	Produced by Raj Production	
A U G U S T	10	Padarasa	Hrishikesh Jambagi	Sanchari Vijay, Vaishnavi Menon, Manasvini, Niranjan Deshpande, Jai Jagadish, Chi. Guru Dutt	Produced by Art N Soul Media Services	
A U G U S T	10	Puttaraju Lover of Shashikala	Sahadev	Amith Gowda, Sushmitha Siddappa, Jayashree Aradhya, Dingri Naresh	Produced by Sri Hanuman Talkies	
A U G U S T	10	Ramarajya	Neel Kengapura	Master Ekanth Prem, Master Hemanth, Master Karthik, Master Sohib, Ashwini Gowda	Produced by Bhuvi Creations	
A U G U S T	10	Savitribai Phule	Vishal Raj	Tara, Suchendra Prasad	Produced by Sri Amogha Siddeshwara Creations	
A U G U S T	10	Vandana	Vijetha	Arun Kumar, Shobhitha Shivanna, Baby Sindhu, Spandana	Produced by Nishma Creations	
A U G U S T	10	Beti	P. Sheshadri	Revathi, Siri Ravikumar	Drama	
A U G U S T	17	Amavase	K. Prashanth	Rajiv Pillai, Dharani	Produced by JC Combines	
A U G U S T	17	Ayogya	S. Mahesh Kumar	Sathish Ninasam, Rachita Ram, Sadhu Kokila, P. Ravishankar	Produced by Crystal Park Cinemas	
A U G U S T	17	Divangatha Manjunathana Geleyaru	Arun N. D.	Rudra Prayag, Sheetal Pandya, Shankar Murthy, Ravi Poojary, Mohan Dass	Produced by 807 Productions	
A U G U S T	17	Onthara Bannagalu	Sunil Bhimrao	Kiran Srinivas, Hitha Chandrashekar, Sonu Gowda, Praveen Pugalia, Sharath Lohitashwa	Produced by SKY Films	
A U G U S T	24	Dhoolipata	Rashmi	Yogesh, Rupesh G. Raj, Archana, Aishwarya	Produced by Director Dream Creation	
A U G U S T	24	Kavi	M. S. Thyagaraj	Punith Gowda, Shobhitha Shivanna		
A U G U S T	24	Life Jothe Ondh Selfie	Dinakar Thoogudeepa	Prem Kumar, Prajwal Devaraj, Hariprriya, Sudharani	Produced by Virat Sai Creations	
A U G U S T	24	May 1st	Nagendra Urs	Jayram Karthik, Rohiet Nair, Raksha Somashekar, Purvi Joshi	Produced by Sri Sai Lakshmi Creations	
A U G U S T	24	Ondalla Eradalla	D. Satya Prakash	Master P. V. Rohith, Sai Krishna Kudla, Anand Neenasam, M. K. Mutt, Prabhudeva Hosadurga	Produced by D. N. Cinemas	
A U G U S T	24	Sarkari Hi. Pra. Shaale, Kasaragodu, Koduge: Ramanna Rai	Rishab Shetty	Ananth Nag, Ranjan, Sampath, Pramod Shetty	Produced by KRG Studios	
A U G U S T	31	Aarohana	Sridhar Shetty	Sushil Kumar, Rohit Shetty, Preethi, Sridhar Shetty, Umesh Punga	Produced by Sri Mallikarjuna Productions	
A U G U S T	31	Abhaya Hastha	Naveen B. P.	Ranjan, Manju, Mandya Sridhar, Saru, Khushi Gowda, Pooja, Aishwarya, Fakirappa Doddamani	Produced by SRS Productions, Navilugari Cinemas	
A U G U S T	31	Chowkur Gate	RGM Dinesh	Rakshith Urs Gopal, Pavithra, Aravind, Gaddappa, Archana, Kuri Ranga, Basavaraj Kumar	Produced by S K Movies	
A U G U S T	31	Mesthri	S. Rajkiran	Balu, Raani, Sangeetha Shetty, Chemban, Tharanga Vishwa, Mohan Juneja	Produced by Sun Light Pictures	
A U G U S T	31	Trataka	Shiva Ganesh	Rahul Ainapura, Hrudaya Avanthi, Akshatha, Bhavani Prakash, Ajith Jairaj, Chitra Shenoy	Produced by Aastha Cinemas	
A U G U S T	31	Uddishya	Hemanth Gowda K	Hemanth, Archana Gayakwad, Akshatha, Ananthavelu, Ashwath Narayan, Vijay Kaundinya	Produced by Chersonese Entertainment, Arch Films	
S E P T E M B E R	7	Bindaas Googly	Santhosh Kumar R. S.	Aakash Anvekar, Shilpa Laddimath, Mamatha Rahuth, Ramakrishna	Produced by Vijaykumar Star Productions	
S E P T E M B E R	7	Manoratha	Prasanna Kumar	Raj Charan, Anjali, Chandru Obaiah, Raghu Ramankoppa	Produced by Shree Venkateshwara Maramma Creations	
S E P T E M B E R	7	Pathibeku.com	Rakesh	Sheethal Shetty, Krishna Adiga, Harini Shrikanth	Produced by Jai Maruthi Pictures	
S E P T E M B E R	14	Kaarni	Vini	Duniya Rashmi, Niranth, Rajesh Ramakrishna	Produced by Gokul Entertainers, Kaivalya	
S E P T E M B E R	21	Gaddappana Duniya	Anil Reddy; Sunil Reddy	Gaddappa, Century Gowda, Raghu Achar, Murali	Produced by SJM Films	
S E P T E M B E R	21	Iruvudellava Bittu	Kantha Kannalli	Thilak Shekar, Meghana Raj, Achyuth Kumar, Shri Mahadev	Produced by Bilwa Creations	
S E P T E M B E R	21	Mane No.67	Jaya Kumar	Sathya Ajith, Vasanthi		
S E P T E M B E R	27	Ambi Ning Vayassaytho	Gurudath Ganiga	Ambareesh, Sudeep, Sruthi Hariharan, Suhasini Maniratnam, Dileep Raj, Rockline Venkatesh, Avinash	Remake of Tamil film Pa. Pandi (2017); Produced by KSK Showreel Productions	
S E P T E M B E R	28	Avanobbane	Vivek Chakari	Chandrakanth, Akshara, Shivakumar Aradhya, Mysore Ramanand	Produced by SS 12 Years Ripined Production	
S E P T E M B E R	28	Kinaare	Devaraj Poojari	Sathish Raj, Gouthami Jadav, Apeksha Purohith, Veena Sundar, Shamanth	Produced by Red Apple Movies, Adithi Film Factory	
O C T O B E R	5	A+	Vijay Surya	Anil Siddhu, Sangeetha Sringeri, Madhusudhan Rao, Lakshmi Hegde	Produced by BR Cinemas	
O C T O B E R	5	Aadi Purana	Mohan Kamakshi	Shashank. K, Ahalya Suresh, Moksha Kushal	Produced by Rainbow Productions	
O C T O B E R	5	Kotti Paise	Kiran R. K.	Ram Chethan, Sahana Y. G., Rachika, M. V. Vasudeva Rao		
O C T O B E R	5	Naduve Antaravirali	Raveen Kumaara	Prakhyath Paramesh, Aishani Shetty, Chikkanna, Thulasi Shivamani	Remake of Tamil film Aadhalal Kadhal Seiveer (2013); Produced by Brunda Productions	
O C T O B E R	5	Snehave Preethi	GLB Srinivas	Suraj Gowda, Sonia Fara, Chitra Shenoy, Sadhu Kokila, Ramesh Bhat	Produced by Ananthalakshmi Creations	
O C T O B E R	18	The Terrorist	P. C. Shekar	Ragini Dwivedi, Giri Shivanna, Manu Hegde, Sameeksha	Produced by Invenio Films	
O C T O B E R	18	The Villain	Prem	Shiva Rajkumar, Sudeep, Amy Jackson, Mithun Chakraborthy, Thilak Shekar	Produced by Tanvi Shanvi Films	
O C T O B E R	26	-3+1	Ramesh Yadav	Abhishek, Sasya, Century Gowda, Ramakrishna, Padma Vasanthi	Produced by Sri Jaganmathe Enterprises	
O C T O B E R	26	Rudrakshipura	Eshwar Polanki	Arjun Chauhan, Roopika, Ravi Chethan	Produced by Sri Chowdeshwari Cine Art Creations	
N O V E M B E R	1	Ammachi Yemba Nenapu	Champa P Shetty	Raj B. Shetty, Vyjayanthi Adiga, Diya Palakkal, Radhakrishna Urala. K, Deepika Aradhya	Produced by Apron Productions	
N O V E M B E R	1	Gvana Yajna	Shivu Saralebettu	Shine Shetty, Manoj Puttur, B. Jayashree, Ramesh Bhat, Anvitha Sagar, Mata Koppala	Produced by KRS Kudla Combines	
N O V E M B E R	1	Kannada Deshadol	Aviram Kanteerava	Suchendra Prasad, Tharak Ponnappa, Jane Volkova, Nazar Ali, Harish Arasu	Produced by JSM Productions	
N O V E M B E R	1	Preethi Keli Sneha Kaledukollabedi	Dinesh Baboo	Raj, Deepa Hiremath, Chaitra, Darshan	Produced by Raj Movie House	
N O V E M B E R	1	Victory 2	Hari Santhosh	Sharan, Asmita Sood, Apoorva, P. Ravi Shankar, Sadhu Kokila, Tabla Nani	Produced by Tarun Talkies	
N O V E M B E R	2	Saahasi Makkalu	Susheel Mukashi	M. Madhusudhan, M. Sushmith, Baby Punya, Bank Janardhan, Dingri Nagaraj, Rekha Das, Honnavalli Krishna, Ramesh Bhat	Produced by Sri Lakshmi Narayana Combines	
N O V E M B E R	9	Galli Bakery	V. R. K. Radhakrishna	Santhosh, Prajju Poovaiah, Yamuna Srinidhi, Ramesh Bhat, Avinash, Suchendra Prasad	Produced by Twin Tower Entertainment Ltd.	
N O V E M B E R	9	Jagath Kiladi	Arav Dheerendra	Niranjan Shetty, Ameeta Kulal, Rangayana Raghu, Suchendra Prasad, Jai Jagadish	Remake of Tamil film Sathuranga Vettai (2014); Produced by Lions Cine Creations	
N O V E M B E R	9	MLA	Manju Maurya	Pratham, Sonal Monteiro, Naveen D. Padil, Kuri Prathap, Sparsha Rekha	Produced by Triveni 24 Crafts	
N O V E M B E R	9	Manasina Mareyali	Oscar Krishna	Kishore Yadav, Divya Gowda, Vardhan Thirthahalli, Nandagopal	Produced by Paanchajanya Combines	
N O V E M B E R	16	8MM Bullet	Harikrishna. S	Jaggesh, Vasishta N. Simha, Mayuri Kyatari, Rockline Venkatesh, Adi Lokesh	Remake of Tamil film 8 Thottakkal (2017); Produced by Haricharan Arts	
N O V E M B E R	16	Jeerjimbe	Karthik Saragur	Siri Vanalli, Lavanya Natana, Suman Nagarkar, Pallavi D. H., Chitra Venkataraju, Gowtham Natana	Produced by Pushkar Films	
N O V E M B E R	16	Puta 109	Dayal Padmanabhan	Jayram Karthik, Naveen Krishna, Vaishnavi Menon, Victory Vasu	Produced by D Pictures and Om Production House	
N O V E M B E R	16	Sur Sur Batthi	Mugil. M	Aarva, Vaishnavi Menon, Urvashi, Sadhu Kokila	Produced by PS Films	
N O V E M B E R	16	Thayige Thakka Maga	Shashank	Krishna Ajai Rao, Ashika Ranganath, Sumalatha, Achyuth Kumar, Sadhu Kokila	Produced by Shashank Cinemass	
N O V E M B E R	23	Apple Cake	Ranjith Kumar Gowda	Ranjith, Aravind, Vijay Shankar, Krishna Anagi, Shubha Raksha, Chaithra Shetty	Produced by Mastermind Inc Entertainment	
N O V E M B E R	23	Friendly Baby	R. Mutthu Kumar	Arjun Sundaram, Jyothi, Keerthiraj, Pavan, Yathiraj, Tennis Krishna	Produced by R Productions	
N O V E M B E R	23	Karshanam	Sharavana	Dhananjay Athre, Anusha Rai, Srinivas Murthy, Vijay Chendoor, HMT Vijay, Chirag	Produced by DJ Entertainments	
N O V E M B E R	23	King of Bidar	Vivek Sajjan	Savan Sagar, Vidyashree P, Sapna Raj, Nagesh Chalva, Ramesh Halli, Nagraj Jogi	Produced by Lakshmi Sagar Creations	
N O V E M B E R	23	Kismath	Vijay Raghavendra	Vijay Raghavendra, Sangeetha Bhat, Saikumar, Nanda Gopal, Dileep Raj, Naveen Krishna, Chikkanna, Honnavalli Krishna	Remake of Tamil film Neram (2013); Produced by Spandana Srushti	
N O V E M B E R	23	Neevu Kare Madida Chandadararu	Monish. C	Dileep Raj, Shilpa Manjunath, Sharath K P, Adarsh H S, Santhosh Reddy, Aishwarya Rangarajan	Produced by Sukruthi Chithralaya	
N O V E M B E R	23	Ondu Sanna Breakna Nantara	Abhilash Gowda	Hithan Hassan, Ammani, Dosthi Surya, Chaithra Mallikarjuna, Kiran Kudlipete	Produced by Colorful Crystal Combines	
N O V E M B E R	23	Raahee	Mahanth M Aski	Shiva Girish, Nandini, Ashwini, Chethan M G, Saligrama Chandru, Stanly, Rank Raghu	Produced by Sri Siddarameshwara Combines	
N O V E M B E R	23	Tharakaasura	Chandrashekar Bandiyappa	Vaibhav, Manvitha Harish, Danny Sapani, Sadhu Kokila, Kari Subbu, Jai Jagadish	Produced by Om Balaji Enterprises	
N O V E M B E R	23	Varnamaya	Ravindra Vemshi	Raj, Shakthi S Shetty, Sunitha Maria Pinto, Aradhya Attavara, Mandya Jaga	Produced by Riddhi Entertainments, Ravindra Talkies	
N O V E M B E R	30	Gaanchali	K. N. Ashok	Adarsh, Akhila Prakash, Ajay, Sharath Lohitashwa, Mithra	Produced by Jai Maruthi Productions	
N O V E M B E R	30	Looty	Girish Kamplapur	Isha Koppikar, Dhruva Sharma, Shwetha Pandit, Kaddipudi Chandru, Dileep Raj, Sadhu Kokila, B. Jayashree	Produced by Studio Focus Entertainment Pvt Ltd.	
D E C E M B E R	7	Bhairava Geetha	Siddhartha	Dhananjay, Irra Mor, Bala Rajwadi	Produced by Abhishek Pictures	
D E C E M B E R	7	Charanti	Mahesh Raval	Parashuram Raval, Madhu, Rekha Das	Produced by Raval Cini Focus	
D E C E M B E R	7	Mundina Badalaavane	Praveen Bhushan	Praveen Bhushan, Sangeetha V	Produced by Sirap Creations	
D E C E M B E R	7	Orange	Prashant Raj	Ganesh, Priya Anand, Dev Gill, Ravishankar Gowda, Sadhu Kokila, Rangayana Raghu, Avinash	Produced by Nimma Cinemas	
D E C E M B E R	14	Aranyani	Bharath Kumar	Anjan Gowda, Theju Ponnappa, Mayur M, Keerthi, Santhosh Arabavi	Produced by Sri Gangadhareshwara Cine Creations	
D E C E M B E R	14	Rangada Hudugaru	Thejesh Kumar	Sagar, Prakyath, Manu Hegde, Amitha Kulal, Shahan Ponnamma, Girish, M. S. Umesh	Produced by Ugama Cine Creations	
D E C E M B E R	14	Sed	J. S. Mahesh	Vijay Karthik, Sulaksha, Yuvaraj Singh, Srinidhi Bhat, Lakshmish Nayak, Yathish, Bhavya	Produced by G-Films Production	
D E C E M B E R	14	Viraj	Nagesh Naradasi	Vidyabharan, Shirin Kunchawala, Nikhitha, Devaraj, Vinaya Prasad, Jai Jagadish, Swathi, Kaddipudi Chandru, Tennis Krishna	Produced by Herambha Combines	
D E C E M B E R	21	Amrutha Ghalige	Ashok Kadaba	Rajashekar, Neethu, H. G. Dattatreya, Padma Vasanthi, Samhitha Vinya	Produced by Shree Banashankari Films	
D E C E M B E R	21	K.G.F: Chapter 1	Prashanth Neel	Yash, Srinidhi Shetty, Ananth Nag, Achyuth Kumar, Vasishta N. Simha, Malavika Avinash, Mita Vashisht	Produced by Hombale Films; Also released in Hindi, Tamil, Telugu and Malayalam	
D E C E M B E R	28	Ajja	Vemagal Jagannath Rao	H. G. Dattatreya, Raj praveen	Produced by Abhishek Films	
D E C E M B E R	28	Ananthu vs Nusrath	Sudheer Shanbhogue	Vinay Rajkumar, Latha Hegde, P. Ravishankar, Guruprasad, H. G. Dattatreya	Produced by Manyatha Productions	
D E C E M B E R	28	Nathicharami	Mansore	Sanchari Vijay, Sruthi Hariharan, Sharanya, Balaji Manohar	Produced by Tejaswini Enterprises	
D E C E M B E R	28	Paradesi C/o London	M. Rajashekar	Vijay Raghavendra, Raashi Mahadev, Rangayana Raghu, Tabla Nani, Danny Kuttappa, Pooja Hunasuru	Produced by B. V. S. Movies	
D E C E M B E R	28	Swartharatna	Ashwin Kodange	Adarsh Gunduraj, Ishitha Varsha, Ramesh Bhat, Sadhu Kokila	Produced by Running Horse Creations	

== See also ==
- List of Kannada films of 2019
- List of Kannada films of 2017
