= Sanchari (disambiguation) =

Sanchari is a 1981 Indian Malayalam film.

Sanchari may also refer to:

- Sanchari Kuruba, a Hindu caste
- Sanchari Mondal, Indian actress
- Sanchari Vijay (1983–2021), Indian theatre and film actor
- Sanchari Theatre, cultural organization in Bangalore, India

== See also ==
- Sancharam (disambiguation)
- Swapna Sanchari, a 2011 Indian Malayalam film
