= List of Kannada films of the 2010s =

The following are lists of Kannada feature films released in the 2010s.

- List of Kannada films of 2010
- List of Kannada films of 2011
- List of Kannada films of 2012
- List of Kannada films of 2013
- List of Kannada films of 2014
- List of Kannada films of 2015
- List of Kannada films of 2016
- List of Kannada films of 2017
- List of Kannada films of 2018
- List of Kannada films of 2019
