= List of Kannada films of 2017 =

A list of Kannada language films produced in the Kannada film industry in India in 2017.

== Box office collection ==
The highest-grossing Kannada films released in 2017, by worldwide box office gross revenue, are as follows.

The rank of the films in the following depends on the worldwide gross.

Highest worldwide gross of 2017
Rank	Title	Production company	Worldwide gross	Ref
1	Raajakumara	Hombale Films	₹75 crore (US$7.8 million)	
2	Hebbuli	SRV Productions	₹36.40 crore (US$3.8 million)	
3	Bharjari	R. S. Productions	₹16 crore (US$1.7 million)	
4	Mufti	Jayanna Combines	₹15 crore (US$1.6 million)	
5	Dandupalya 2	Venkaat Movies	₹10.25 crore (US$1.1 million)	
6	Operation Alamelamma	Suni Cinemas StarFab	₹10 crore (US$1.0 million)	
7	Tarak	Sri Chowdeshwari Cine Combines	₹8.5 crore (US$880,000)	
8	Chowka	Dwarakish Chitra	₹7 crore (US$730,000)	
9	Ondu Motteya Kathe	Pawan Kumar Studios, Mango Pickle Entertainment	₹4.5 crore (US$470,000)	
10	Beautiful Manasugalu	Skkanddaa Entertainment	₹3 crore (US$310,000)	

== Film awards events ==
- 64th National Film Awards
- 2016 Karnataka State Film Awards
- 64th Filmfare Awards South
- 6th South Indian International Movie Awards
- Suvarna Film Awards, by Suvarna channel.
- Udaya Film Awards, by Udaya Channel
- Bengaluru International Film Festival
- Bangalore Times Film Awards

== January–June ==
Opening		Title	Director	Cast	Notes	Ref
J A N U A R Y	6	No Ball	Prakash; Gopi	Aakash, Rakhi	Produced by Samarth Creations	
J A N U A R Y	6	Pushpaka Vimana	Ravindranath	Ramesh Aravind, Rachita Ram, Yuvina Parthavi	Produced by Vikhyath Cinemas	
J A N U A R Y	6	Srikanta	Manju Swaraj	Shiva Rajkumar, Chandini Sreedharan, Vijay Raghavendra	Produced by Mahashaila Cinebandha	
J A N U A R Y	13	Lee	H. M. Srinandan	Sumanth Shailendra, Nabha Natesh, Sneha Namdhani, Sadhu Kokila, Rahul Dev, Rangayana Raghu, Chikkanna, Suchendra Prasad	Produced by Vivid Dreams Entertainment	
J A N U A R Y	20	Arivu	R. Ranganath	Varun, Mahendra Munnoth, Navaneeth, B M Giriraj, Honnavalli Krishna, Chiranjeevi, Akshitha	Produced by Anand Cinemas	
J A N U A R Y	20	Beautiful Manasugalu	Jayatheertha	Sathish Ninasam, Shruthi Hariharan, Achyuth Kumar, Tabla Nani, Prashanth Siddi	Produced by Skanda Entertainment	
J A N U A R Y	20	En Nin Problemmu	Lucky	Channegowda, Singri Gowda, Abhishek H N, Nandini	Produced by Lucky Movies	
J A N U A R Y	20	Riktha	Amruth Kumar T. M.	Sanchari Vijay, Advika Kanagal, Ramya, Varshini, Abhi, Madesh	Produced by Sri Lakshmihayagreeva Combines	
J A N U A R Y	26	Allama	T.S. Nagabharana	Dhananjay, Meghana Raj, Lakshmi Gopalaswamy, Sanchari Vijay, Taushir, Ramakrishna	Produced by Yajaman Enterprises	
J A N U A R Y	27	Mumbai	S. R. Ramesh	Madarangi Krishna, Theju, Ashish Vidyarthi, Rangayana Raghu, Chaswa, Bullet Prakash	Produced by Ramu Films	
F E B R U A R Y	3	Chowka	Tharun Sudhir	Prem Kumar, Vijay Raghavendra, Prajwal Devaraj, Diganth, Priyamani, Bhavana, Aindrita Ray, Deepa Sannidhi, Darshan, Kashinath	Produced by Dwarakish Chithra & Bagpipers Soda	
F E B R U A R Y	3	Hai	G. N. Rudresh	Yashraj, Sania, Jai Jagadish, Vijayakashi, Pavithra Lokesh, Sangeetha, Sadhu Kokila	Produced by Sevencrore Productions	
F E B R U A R Y	3	Jalsa	Kantha Kannalli	Niranjan Wadeyar, Akanksha, Anusha, Shashank Seshagiri, Vinay, Anand, Shobhraj, Bullet Prakash	Produced by Silver Screen Talkies	
F E B R U A R Y	3	Rush	Ruthvik Deshpande	Ruthvik Deshpande, Prakash, Sneha Nair	Produced by Deshpande Combines	
F E B R U A R Y	3	Style Raja	Harish	Chikkanna, Girish, Ranusha Kushvi, Girija Lokesh, Shobhraj	Produced by Bhumika Productions	
F E B R U A R Y	10	Amaravathi	B. M. Giriraj	Achyuth Kumar, Ninasam Ashwath, Hemanth Sushil, Vidya Venkataram, Vaishali Deepak	Produced by Sri Nilayam Cine Creations	
F E B R U A R Y	10	Bannada Neralu	Shashidhar. B	Nassar, Tennis Krishna, Priya Danappanavar, Ananya Shetty, Srithej	Produced by Shivaram Maheshwari Movies	
F E B R U A R Y	10	Enendu Hesaridali	Ravi Basappanadoddi	Arjun, Roja, Chithkala Biradar, Milind Gunaji, Sunethra Pandit, M. S. Umesh	Produced by Sugar Cube Creations	
F E B R U A R Y	10	Melkote Manja	Jaggesh	Jaggesh, Aindrita Ray, Rangayana Raghu, Srinivas Prabhu, Killer Venkatesh, Chandrakala, Mimicry Dayanand, Kuri Prathap, Bank Janardhan	Produced by Sri Kondada Beereshwara Swamy Films	
F E B R U A R Y	10	Smile Please	Raghu Samarth	Gurunandan, Kavya Shetty, Neha Patil, Rangayana Raghu, Srinivas Prabhu, Avinash, Sudha Belawadi	Produced by K Manju Cinemas	
F E B R U A R Y	17	Mana Manthana	Suresh Heblikar	Kiran Rajput, Arpita Gowda, Suresh Heblikar, Ramesh Bhat, Sangeetha, Suman	Produced by Manasa Arts	
F E B R U A R Y	17	Preethi Prema	Kashi	Chaithanya, Nidhi Kushalappa, Girish T S, Girish Vidyanathan, Yamuna Srinidhi, Tennis Krishna	Produced by Virgo Illusions & P R Movie Makers	
F E B R U A R Y	17	Tonic	Prakash - Gopi	Omprakash Naik, Harshika Gowda	Produced by Samarth Creations	
F E B R U A R Y	23	Hebbuli	S. Krishna	Sudeep, Amala Paul, V. Ravichandran, P. Ravi Shankar, Ravi Kishan, Kabir Duhan Singh	Produced by SRV Productions & Umapathy Films	
F E B R U A R Y	24	Srinivasa Kalyana	M. G. Srinivas	M. G. Srinivas, Kavitha Gowda, Nikhila Rao, Achyuth Kumar, H. G. Dattatreya, RJ Pallavi, Sujay Shastry	Produced by Mars Films & MG Cinemas	
M A R C H	3	1/4 Kg Preethi	Sathya Shourya Sagar	Vihan Gowda, Hitha Chandrashekar	Produced by Long Drive Films	
M A R C H	3	Eradane Sala	Guruprasad	Dhananjay, Sangeetha Bhat, Lakshmi, Avinash, Padmaja Rao	Produced by Yogesh Motion Pictures & Guruprasad Inc.	
M A R C H	3	Jilebi	Lucky Shankar	Pooja Gandhi, Yashas Surya, Vijay Chendoor, Nagendra U A, H. G. Dattatreya, Tabla Nani	Produced by Shivashankar Film Factory	
M A R C H	10	Bangalore Underworld	P. N. Sathya	Aditya, Payal Radhakrishna, Bhavana, Daniel Balaji, Kote Prabhakar, Harish Rai	Produced by Majestic Touring Talkies	
M A R C H	10	Prathima	N. Shivanandam	H. G. Dattatreya, Divyashree, Ravichethan, Meenakshi Harthi, B Shivanand	Produced by Technomark Television Network Pvt Ltd	
M A R C H	10	Real Police	Om Sai Prakash	Saikumar, Disha Poovaiah, Sadhu Kokila, Manjunath Hegde, Akshatha	Produced by Azad Films	
M A R C H	10	Vardhana	S. K. Nagendra Urs	Harsha, Neha Patil, Chikkanna, Padmaja Rao, Shobhraj, Petrol Prasanna	Produced by KVS Cine Productions	
M A R C H	10	Veera Ranachandi	Anand P. Raju	Ragini Dwivedi, Sharath Lohitashwa, Bhajarangi Loki, Ramesh Bhat, Padmaja Rao, Shobhraj	Produced by Super Good Combines & Vijayakumari Films	
M A R C H	17	Dhwani	Sebastian David	Chandan Sharma, Ithi Acharya, Ramesh Bhat, Vinaya Prasad	Produced by Lion Cine Creations	
M A R C H	17	Eradu Kanasu	Madan. A	Vijay Raghavendra, Karunya Ram, Krishi Thapanda	Produced by Sterling Movie Makers	
M A R C H	17	Kalaberake	Madhu Diwakar	Aniruddh, Sanjana Prakash	Produced by Cine Kefe	
M A R C H	17	Shuddhi	Adarsh Eshwarappa	Nivedhitha, Lauren Spartano, Amrutha Karagada, Shashank Purushottam	Produced by Sanvi Pictures	
M A R C H	17	Urvi	B. S. Pradeep Varma	Shruti Hariharan, Shraddha Srinath, Shwetha Pandit, Achyuth Kumar	Produced by Airier Drreams	
M A R C H	24	Raajakumara	Santhosh Ananddram	Puneeth Rajkumar, Priya Anand, Ananth Nag, Sarath Kumar, Prakash Raj	Produced by Hombale Films	
M A R C H	31	Ajaramara	Ravi Karanji	Tharak Ponnappa, Roshini Prakash, Mithra, Suchendra Prasad, Ramesh Bhat	Produced by Banz Creative vision	
M A R C H	31	Manasu Mallige	S. Narayan	Nishanth, Rinku Rajguru	Produced by Rockline Productions and Zee Studios	
M A R C H	31	Rogue	Puri Jagannadh	Ishaan, Mannara Chopra, Angela Krislinzki, Thakur Anoop Singh, Ajaz Khan	Produced by Tanvi Films	
A P R I L	7	Roopa	Anthony Kamal	Mamata Rahuth, Shobhraj, Rekha Kumar, Anthony Kamal	Produced by Rogers Production House	
A P R I L	7	Soundarya Nilaya	Gurumurthy	Kamal, Abhinayashree, Kempe Gowda, Bullet Prakash, Ravi Reddy	Produced by Nandini Combines	
A P R I L	14	Chakravarthy	Chinthan A. V.	Darshan, Deepa Sannidhi, Auditya, Srujan Lokesh, Kumar Bangarappa, Dinakar Thoogudeepa	Produced by Veera Films	
A P R I L	21	Engineers	Vinay Ratnasiddhi	Santhosh, Shankar, Chandana, Kavya, Shamataj	Produced by Vinay Rathnasiddi Film Productions	
A P R I L	21	Part-2	Buddhadev	Govindu, Pallavi Venkatesh, Lohith, Jeevan Sridhar	Produced by Sneha Sparsha Creations	
A P R I L	21	Raaga	PC Shekhar	Mithra, Bhama, Avinash, Roopika, Kaddipudi Chandru	Produced by Mithra Entertainer Cine Creations	
A P R I L	28	Porki Huccha Venkat	Huccha Venkat	Huccha Venkat, Soumya Varanasi, Ramesh Bhat, Keerthi Raj	Produced by Sri Sankashta Hara Ganapathi Cine Pictures	
A P R I L	28	Yudha Kanda	Om Sai Prakash	Kishore, Madhuri Itagi, Adi Lokesh, Shobhraj	Produced by Babu Films	
M A Y	5	Chalagara	A. R. Ravindra	Manohar, Gururaj Hoskote, Manjunath Hegde, Padma Vasanthi	Produced by Sukruthi Chitralaya Film	
M A Y	5	Happy New Year	Pannaga Bharana	B. C. Patil, Vijay Raghavendra, Diganth, Saikumar, Dhananjay, Sudharani, Shruthi Hariharan, Shrushti Patil	Produced by Soumya Films	
M A Y	5	Marali Manege	Yogesh Master	Shruti, Suchendra Prasad, Aniruddha Jatkar, Shankar Aryan, Rohan Kidiyoor	Produced by Sukruthi Chitralaya Film	
M A Y	5	Pokari Raja	K. Shankar	Raja, Shobha, Ramya, Petrol Prasanna	Produced by RKR Movies	
M A Y	5	Simha Hakida Hejje	Vikram K. Kumar	Preetham Puneeth, Amrutha, Sharath Lohitashwa, Shobhraj	Produced by Pathi Films	
M A Y	12	Lift Man	Shreedhar	Sundar Raj, Suresh Heblikar, Sheetal Shetty, Sunil Puranik	Produced by Ram Pictures	
M A Y	12	Maasthi Gudi	Nagashekar	Duniya Vijay, Kriti Kharbanda, Amulya, Rangayana Raghu	Produced by KPS Combines	
M A Y	19	Bangara s/o Bangarada Manushya	Yogi G. Raj	Shiva Rajkumar, Vidya Pradeep, Srinath, Shivaram, Sadhu Kokila, Chikkanna	Produced by Jayanna Combines	
M A Y	19	Banna Bannada Baduku	Ismail Moodushadde	Raviraj Shetty, Anvitha Sagar, Ria Meghana, Ramesh Bhat, Honnavalli Krishna	Produced by Sri Muthuram Creations	
M A Y	19	Karaali	Dakshinamurthy	Saahil Raj, Prerana Iyengar, Vikash Deshmukh, Shalini	Produced by Vedanth Productions	
M A Y	26	BB5	Janardhan. N	Radhika Chetan, Poornachandra Mysore, Rajesh Nataranga, Rashmi Prabhakar	Produced by Shiva Home Talkies	
M A Y	26	Keetle Krishna	Nagaraj Arehole	Master Hemanth, Master Madhusudhan, Spandana, Inchara Suresh, Harish Raj, Neenasam Ashwath, Petrol Prasanna	Produced by Surya Entertainers	
M A Y	26	Pataki	Manju Swaraj	Ganesh, Ranya Rao, Saikumar, Ashish Vidyarthi, Sadhu Kokila	Produced by S. V. Productions	
M A Y	26	Tab	Mallikarjun Hoysala	Narayan Swami, H. G. Dattatreya, Lakshmi Hegde, Siddaraja Kalyankar, Master Jayanth	Produced by S. L. V. Films	
J U N E	2	Ee Kalarava	Sandeep Daksh	Naveen Krishna, Rohini Bharadwaj	Produced by MMG Films	
J U N E	2	Eleyaru Naavu Geleyaru	Vikram Soori	Achintya, Nihaal, Tejaswini, Mahathi, Abhishek, Amogh, Mahendra, Tushar, Sooraj	Produced by Akash Productions	
J U N E	2	Life 360	Arjun Kishore Chandra	Arjun Kishore Chandra, Anusha Ranganath, Payal Radhakrishna, Hemanth Sushil	Produced by Sri Sai Gagan Productions	
J U N E	2	Sarkari Kelasa Devara Kelasa	R. Ravindra	Ravishankar Gowda, Samyukta Hornad, Ashish Vidyarthi, Rangayana Raghu, Raju Thalikote	Produced by Ashwini Recording Company	
J U N E	9	Jindaa	Mussanje Mahesh	Yuvaraj, Meghana Raj, Devaraj, Srinivasa Murthy, Girija Lokesh	Produced by Dattha Films	
J U N E	9	Noorondu Nenapu	Kumaresh M	Chethan Kumar, Sushmitha Joshi, Meghana Raj, Rajavardhan, Rajesh Nataranga	Adapted from Marathi play Duniyadari; Produced by 3 Lions Production	
J U N E	9	Yugapurusha	Manjunath Maskalmatti	Arjun Dev, Pooja Jhaveri, Devaraj, Pavan, Shobhraj	Produced by Rashi Films	
J U N E	9	Shastri (Re-release)	P. N. Sathya	Darshan, Manya, Sadhu Kokila	Produced by Namana Films	
J U N E	16	Bhagavad Sri Ramanuja	Raja Ravishankar	Ganesh Rao, Om Sai Prakash, Bharat Kalyan, Radhika Iyengar	Produced by Sri Yathiraj Creations	
J U N E	16	Chitta Chanchala	Yku Sundar Yetinatti	Divam Kunder, Prathika Saroy, Chitra Shenoy, Dhruthi Sai	Produced by Take One Productions	
J U N E	16	Siliconn City	Murali Gurappa	Srinagar Kitty, Suraj Gowda, Kavya Shetty, Ekta Rathod, Chikkanna, Ashok	Produced by Kannada Circle	
J U N E	16	Students	Santhosh Kumar R. S.	Kiran G. Ralbagi, Ankitha, Suvarna Shetty, Sachin Hosamane, Sachin Purohit, Madikeri Bhavya	Produced by R. S. Productions	
J U N E	16	Tiger	Nanda Kishore	Pradeep, Madhuurima, P. Ravishankar, Chikkanna, Om Puri, Rangayana Raghu, K. Shivaram	Produced by Inchara Film Factory	
J U N E	23	Panta	S. Narayan	Anup Revanna, Ritiksha, Ravi Kale, Kari Subbu	Produced by Devasenaa Arts	
J U N E	30	Aake	K. M. Chaitanya	Chiranjeevi Sarja, Sharmiela Mandre, Achyuth Kumar, Prakash Belawadi	Produced by Eros International and K. S. Dreams	
J U N E	30	Nammoor Haiklu	Prasanna Shetty	Pawan, Tejesh Kumar, Mamatha Rahut, Deepthi Manne, Raghu Raj	Produced by V. P. Combines	
J U N E	30	Nanobne Ollevnu	Vijay Mahesh	Vijay Mahesh, Soujanya, Harshitha, Annie Prince, Ravitheja	Produced by V. M. Creations	
J U N E	30	Sanjeyalli Aralida Hoovu	M. D. Kaushik	Narayan Swamy, Jayashree Raj, Arjun Yogesh Raj	Produced by Sri Lakshminarasimha Arts	

== July–December ==
Opening		Title	Director	Cast	Notes	Ref
J U L Y	7	Hombanna	Rakshith Thirthahalli	Subbu Talabi, Dhanu Gowda, Varsha Acharya, Suchendra Prasad, H. G. Dattatreya	Produced by Sanchalana Movies	
J U L Y	7	Kolara	Aryaa M. Mahesh	Yogesh, Naina Sarwar, Ninasam Ashwath, Sampath Kumar, Thilak	Produced by Arya Films	
J U L Y	7	Ondu Motteya Kathe	Raj B. Shetty	Raj B. Shetty, Shailashree Mulki, Usha Bhandari, Deepak Rai Panaje	Produced by Pawan Kumar Studios	
J U L Y	7	Katha Vichitra	Anup Anthony	Anu Poovamma, Sri Harshavardhan, Harry Praveen Correa	Produced by Sketch Pencil Productions	
J U L Y	14	2	Srinivasa Raju	Pooja Gandhi, Makarand Deshpande, Sanjjana, Shruti, Prakash Rai, Ravi Kale, P. Ravishankar	Produced by Venkaat Movies	
J U L Y	14	Gapallondu Cinema	Manju Heddur	Shashi Kumar, Mamatha Rahuth, Pruthvi Raj, Ravi Suriya	Produced by Arya Aanya Productions	
J U L Y	14	Halli Panchayathi	G. Umesh	Singri Gowda, Abhishek H. N., Channe Gowda, Geetha	Produced by Sri Vaishnavi Entertainers	
J U L Y	14	Hosa Anubhava	S. Umesh	Sanchari Vijay, B. R. Ravanappa, S. Narayan, Yashaswini, Bhavya	Produced by K. S. Productions	
J U L Y	14	Putani Safari	Ravindra Venshi	Manish Ballal, Sahanashri, Master Rakina, Master Rajiva Pratham, Baby Brinda, Baby Manasa	Produced by Swarnaganga Films & Friends Film Factory	
J U L Y	21	Dada Is Back	Santhosh	R. Parthiepan, Arun Kumar, Shravya, Sudharani, Ajay Raj Urs, Sharath Lohitashwa	Produced by Apple Films & Dayanand Sounds	
J U L Y	21	Dhairyam	Shiva Tejas	Ajay Rao, Aditi Prabhudeva, P. Ravishankar, Sadhu Kokila, Jai Jagadish	Produced by Raj Productions	
J U L Y	21	Meenakshi	Sridhar	Raghu Mukherjee, Shubha Poonja, Geetha	Produced by Adithya Ramesh Combines	
J U L Y	21	Operation Alamelamma	Simple Suni	Manish Rishi, Shraddha Srinath, Aruna Balraj, Vijeth Gowda	Produced by StarFab Productions and Suni Cinemas	
J U L Y	21	Shwethaa	Rajesh R. Balipa	Akshatha Marla, Hridaya Shiva, Jayasheela Gowda, Srinivas Prabhu, Kiran Vati	Produced by SRY Productions	
J U L Y	21	Toss	Dayal Padmanabhan	Vijay Raghavendra, Sandeep, Ramya Barna	Produced by D Productions	
J U L Y	21	Trigger	Vijay Palegar	Chethan Gandharva, Jeevika Pillappa, Ninasam Ashwath, Honnavalli Krishna	Produced by Kamadhenu SKS Films	
J U L Y	28	Aa Eradu Varshagalu	B. Madhusudhan	Renuk Mathad, Ameeta S. Kulal, Ramakrishna, Triveni	Produced by Abhimatha Productions	
J U L Y	28	Baragala	Mahantesh Ramdurga	Mahantesh Ramdurga, Nagarathna	Produced by SRY Productions	
J U L Y	28	Kireeta	Kiran Chandra	Samarth, Deepthi Kapse, Lekha Chandra, Rishika Singh, Ugram Manju	Produced by BGR Pictures	
J U L Y	28	Vismaya	Arun Vaidyanathan	Arjun Sarja, Sruthi Hariharan, Varalaxmi Sarathkumar, Prasanna, Vaibhav Reddy, Suhasini Maniratnam, Sudharani	Produced by Passion Film Factory; Tamil - Kannada bilingual film	
A U G U S T	4	Raj Vishnu	K. Madesh	Sharan, Chikkanna, Vaibhavi Shandilya, Sadhu Kokila, Sriimurali	Produced by Ramu Films	
A U G U S T	4	Sneha Chakra	Manoj Vishnuvardhan	Vijay Venkat, Anvitha Sagar, Shilpa Suvarna	Produced by Sri Lakshmi Venkateshwara Swami Prasanna	
A U G U S T	4	Thathana Thithi Mommagana Prastha	Krishna Chandra	Loki, Shubha Poonja, Om Prakash Rao, Singri Gowda, Channe Gowda	Produced by Sri Srinivasa Groups	
A U G U S T	11	E1	A. R. Ramesh	A. R. Ramesh, Shamitha Shah		
A U G U S T	11	Jani	P. K. H. Das	Vijay Raghavendra, Milana Nagaraj, Janani Anthony, Suman, Rangayana Raghu, Sadhu Kokila	Produced by Aishwarya Film Productions	
A U G U S T	11	Mass Leader	Narasimha Murthy	Shiva Rajkumar, Vijay Raghavendra, Pranitha Subhash, Vamsi Krishna, Gururaj Jaggesh, Ashika Ranganath, Yogesh, Sharmiela Mandre	Produced by Tarun Talkies	
A U G U S T	11	Paaru I Love You	Sunil Hubballi	Neethu, Ranjan, Killer Venkatesh, Micheal Madhu, Mohan Juneja	Produced by Jagadh Jyothi Movie Makers	
A U G U S T	18	First Love	Mallikarjun	RJ Rajesh, Sneha Nair, Kavitha Gowda	Produced by Aditya Film Productions	
A U G U S T	18	Kaafi Thota	T. N. Seetharam	Raghu Mukherjee, Radhika Chetan, Rahul Madhav, Samyukta Hornad, B. C. Patil, T. N. Seetharam, Veena Sundar	Produced by Manvanthara Chitra	
A U G U S T	18	Kadhal	Murali S. V.	Aakash Suresh, Dharani	Produced by A A Motion Pictures	
A U G U S T	18	Maarikondavaru	K. Shivarudraiah	Sanchari Vijay, Samyukta Hornad, Sonu Gowda, Sardar Sathya	Produced by Akshara Creations	
A U G U S T	18	Parchandi	Zoom Ravi	Vasudeva Murthy, Shobharaj, Mahesh Devi. Shivaji	Produced by Indian Entertainers	
A U G U S T	25	5th Generation	Guruvendra Shetty	Praveen Tej, Nidhi Subbaiah	Produced by J J Enterprises	
A U G U S T	25	Krishna S/o CM	M. S. Ramesh	Ajay Rao, Bharathi	Produced by Saraswathi Entertainers	
A U G U S T	25	March 22	Kodlu Ramakrishna	Aryavardhan, Kiran Raj, Meghashree, Ananth Nag, Geetha, Deepti Shetty	Produced by Lakshmi Movies	
A U G U S T	25	Saheba	Bharath. S	Manoranjan Ravichandran, Shanvi Srivastav, Bullet Prakash, Pramila Joshai	Produced by Jayanna Combines	
S E P T E M B E R	1	Happy Journey	Shyam Shivamogga	Srujan Lokesh, Amitha Kulal, Ramesh Bhat, Naveen D. Padil, Shivadwaj	Produced by Sri Sai Karishma Cine Creations	
S E P T E M B E R	1	Mugulu Nage	Yogaraj Bhat	Ganesh, Apoorva Arora, Nikitha Narayan, Ashika Ranganath, Amulya, Ananth Nag, Rangayana Raghu	Produced by Media House Studio	
S E P T E M B E R	1	Uppina Kagada	B. Suresha	T. S. Nagabharana, Apoorva Bharadwaj, Mandya Ramesh	Produced by S. S. Films, Golden Movies and Yogaraj Cinemas	
S E P T E M B E R	8	Ayana	Gangadhar Salimath	Deepak Subramanya, Apoorva Soma, Vedashree Rao, Sriharsha Hoskere, Moksha Kushal	Produced by Dees Films	
S E P T E M B E R	8	Darpana	Karthik Venkatesh	Arvind Rau, Yethiraj, Sundeep Malani, Dubai Rafiq, KC Singh, Chitra, Madhura	Produced by JAH's Creative Inn	
S E P T E M B E R	8	H Yarige	Lakshmiraj Shetty	Lakshmiraj Shetty, Shirisha Reddy	Produced by Roseland Pictures	
S E P T E M B E R	8	Halli Sogadu	M. R. Kapil	Aarav Surya, Akshara, Doddarange Gowda	Produced by Rajendra Suri Productions	
S E P T E M B E R	8	Rajahamsa	Jadesh Kumar Hampi	Gowrishankar SRG, Ranjani Raghavan, Sridhar, Yamuna, B. C. Patil, Tabla Nani, Bullet Prakash	Produced by JanaMana Cinemas	
S E P T E M B E R	15	Bharjari	Chethan Kumar	Dhruva Sarja, Rachita Ram, Hariprriya, Vaishali Deepak, Sudharani, Tara, P. Ravishankar, Saikumar	Produced by R. S. Productions	
S E P T E M B E R	15	Krack	K. Ram Narayan	Vinod Prabhakar, Akanksha Gandhi, Kaddipudi Chandru, H. G. Dattatreya, Padmaja Rao	Produced by Samuha Talkies and Vijay Cinemas	
S E P T E M B E R	29	Tarak	Prakash	Darshan, Shanvi Srivastava, Sruthi Hariharan, Devaraj, Sadhu Kokila	Produced by Sri Chowdeshwari Cine Creations & Sri Jaimatha Combines	
O C T O B E R	6	April Na Himabindu	Shiv - Jagan	H. G. Dattatreya, Babu Hirannaiah, Spandana, Chidanand	Produced by Shiv Jagan and Associates	
O C T O B E R	6	Huliraaya	Aravind Kaushik	Balu Nagendra, Divya Uruduga, Navarasa Ramakrishna, Renu, Chirashree Anchan	Produced by SLN Creations	
O C T O B E R	6	Kidi	Raghu. S	R Bhuvan Chandra, Pallavi Gowda, Ugramm Manju, Danny Kuttappa, Pavan. K	Produced by Master Choice Creations	
O C T O B E R	6	Lakshmi Narayanara Prapanchane Bere	Vinaya Prasad	Vinaya Prasad, Manjunath Hegde, Prathama Prasad, Jyothi Prakash	Produced by Vinaya Prasad Productions Limited.	
O C T O B E R	6	Vaira	Navarasan	Sharan Ulthi, Priyanka Malnad, Tabla Nani, Navarasan, Ajay	Produced by Dharmasree Enterprises and Geetha Entertainments	
O C T O B E R	13	Aadu Aata Aadu	Ramanath Rugvedi	Shruti Marathe, Biju Menon, Thilak Shekar, Suman Ranganathan	Produced by Kuber Productions	
O C T O B E R	13	Gayatri	Sathya Samrat	Chethan Kumar, Shobha Rani, Vijay Gowda	Produced by Kumar Movies	
O C T O B E R	13	Kariya 2	Prabhu Srinivas	Santhosh Balaraj, Mayuri Kyatari, Sadhu Kokila, Ajay Ghosh	Produced by Santhosh Enterprises	
O C T O B E R	13	Kataka	Ravi Basrur	Ashok Raj, Spandana, Shlaga Saligrama, Madhav Karkada	Produced by Omkar Movies and Ravi Basrur Productions	
O C T O B E R	13	Sithara	A. R. Masthan	Harish Raj, Dileep Raj, Neha Patil, Neethu, Ramesh Bhat		
O C T O B E R	13	Thikla Kambaniya Kathe	Anjinayya	Vijay Venkata, Radhika Ram, Mandeep Roy	Produced by Sri Gayatri Devi Combines	
O C T O B E R	20	Dayavittu Gamanisi	Rohit Padaki	Raghu Mukherjee, Vasishta N. Simha, Sukrutha Wagle, Samyukta Hornad, Rajesh Nataranga, Poornachandra Mysore, Bhavana Rao, Prakash Belawadi, Sangeetha Bhat	Produced by Krishna Creations	
O C T O B E R	20	Satya Harishchandra	Dayal Padmanabhan	Sharan, Sanchita Padukone, Bhavana Rao, Chikkanna, Sadhu Kokila, Seetha	Produced by K. Manju Cinemaas	
O C T O B E R	27	Dumki Damaar	S. Pradeep Varma	S. Pradeep Varma, Chaitra Shetty, Inchara Gowda, Anushka Sethi, Sunil Kumar	Produced by Sri Bhumika Productions	
O C T O B E R	27	Mojo	Sreesha Belakavadi	Manu U. B., Anusha Krishna	Produced by Poorvi Arts	
O C T O B E R	27	Sarvasva	Shreyas Kabadi	Tilak Shekar, Chethan Vardhan, Ranusha Kashvi, Sathvika Appaiah	Produced by Sarvam Productions	
O C T O B E R	27	Tiger Galli	Ravi Srivatsa	Sathish Ninasam, Bhavana Rao, Roshni Prakash, Shivamani, Sai Krishna, Pooja Lokesh	Produced by YKF	
N O V E M B E R	3	Haalu Thuppa	Shashank Raj	Pawan Soorya, Gaddappa, Singre Gowda, Mouna, Honnavalli Krishna, Jayaram	Produced by Bhumiputra	
N O V E M B E R	3	Jaali Baaru Mattu Poli Hudugaru	Shreedhar	Madarangi Krishna, Manasi Vasudeva, Chikkanna, Sanketh Kashi, Jayalakshmi	Produced by Silver Feather Productions	
N O V E M B E R	3	Nishabda 2	Devaraj Kumar	Roopesh Shetty, Aradhya Shetty, Avinash, Petrol Prasanna	Produced by Makara Jyothi Productions	
N O V E M B E R	3	Once More Kaurava	S. Mahendar	Naresh Gowda, Anusha Ranganath, Devaraj, Anu Prabhakar, Shivaram	Produced by Ayush Enterprises	
N O V E M B E R	10	Biko	Sandeep Daksh	Reva, Rishitha Malnad, Rockline Sudhakar	Produced by Jai Chamundeshwari Films	
N O V E M B E R	10	College Kumar	Santhu	Vikky Varun, Samyuktha Hegde, P. Ravishankar, Shruti, Achyuth Kumar	Produced by M. R. Pictures	
N O V E M B E R	10	Jayasurya	Santosh Shiramundu	Santosh Shiramundu	Produced by Kolhapur Mahalaxmi Cine Combines	
N O V E M B E R	10	Kharabath	M. S. Ravindra	M. S. Ravindra, Shwetha Reddy, Balaram, Ashwini Chandru	Produced by Colors Creations	
N O V E M B E R	10	Nuggekai	A. Venugopal	Madhusudhan Vijaykumar, Ester Noronha, Suchendra Prasad, Vijanath Biradar, Mukund Gowda	Produced by Ads Creations	
N O V E M B E R	10	Psycho Shankara	Punith Arya	Navarasan, Yashas Surya, Vijay Chendoor, Sharath Lohitashwa, Amrutha Ramamurthy, Rashika	Produced by Adi Shakti Creations	
N O V E M B E R	10	Rajaru	Gireesh Moolimani	Niranjan Shetty, Shalini Vadnikatti, Pruthvi Ambaar, Mythri Jagadish, Kari Subbu	Produced by MRS Cine Creations	
N O V E M B E R	10	Samyuktha 2	Abhiram	Prabhu Suryah, Chetan Chandra, Neha Patil, Aishwarya Sindhogi, Tabla Nani	Produced by Siri Productions	
N O V E M B E R	17	9 Hilton House	K. Narendra Babu	Kiran Bhagwan, Divya Rao	Produced by RV Films	
N O V E M B E R	17	Kempiruve	Venkat Bharadwaj	H. G. Dattatreya, Sayaji Shinde, Laxman Shivashankar, Nataranga Shicasha, Bhasi Bhaskar	Produced by Amrutha Film Center	
N O V E M B E R	17	Mahanubhavaru	Sandeep Nagalikar	Gokul Raj, Balachander, Anusha Rai, Priyanka	Produced by Munnudi Creations	
N O V E M B E R	17	Nan Magale Heroine	Bahubali	Sanchari Vijay, B. C. Patil, Tabla Nani, Amrutha Rao, Vijay Chendoor	Produced by Sri Kalabhairaveshwara Combines	
N O V E M B E R	17	Panipuri	K. P. Naveen	Jagadish, Akshata Sreedhar Shastry, Sanjay, Vaibhav	Produced by Kushi Combines	
N O V E M B E R	17	Upendra Matte Baa	N. Arun Lokanath	Upendra, Sruthi Hariharan, Prema, Harshika Poonacha, Avinash, Vasishta N. Simha, Sadhu Kokila	Produced by Hayagreeva Enterprises	
N O V E M B E R	24	Athiratha	Mahesh Babu	Chethan Kumar, Latha Hegde, Kabir Duhan Singh, Sadhu Kokila, Avinash, Achyuth Kumar	Produced by Chamundi Cine Creations	
N O V E M B E R	24	Hani Hani Ibbani	Maddur Shivu	Manoj Nandam, Deepthi Kapse, Ajit Jayaraj	Produced by Sri Sai Ventures	
N O V E M B E R	24	Mombatthi	Srinivas Kaushik	Ravi Kumar, Neethu, Rachana Smith, Yethiraj	Produced by Bright Cut Cinema Frames	
N O V E M B E R	24	Uppu Huli Khara	Imran Sardhariya	Sharath, Anushree, Malashri, Jayashree, Shashi Devaraj	Produced by Tejeshwini Enterprises	
D E C E M B E R	1	Dream Girl	Lakshman Nayak	Patre Ajith, Amrutha Rao, Deepika Das	Produced by	
D E C E M B E R	1	Gowdru Hotel	Pon Kumaran	Rachan Chandra, Vedhika, Prakash Raj Ananth Nag	Produced by Eminent Movie Makers	
D E C E M B E R	1	Mantram	S. S. Sajjan	Pallavi Raju, Shamanth Shetty, Anil Kumar Gaurish Akki		
D E C E M B E R	1	Mufti	Narthan	Sriimurali, Shiva Rajkumar, Shanvi Srivastava, Vasishta N. Simha	Produced by Jayanna Films	
D E C E M B E R	8	Anveshi	Vemagal Jagannath Rao	Tilak Shekar, Raghu Bhat, Shraddha Sharma, Disha Poovaiah, Ramya Barna, Anu Aggarwal, Avinash	Produced by Sri Lakshmi Venkateshwara Entertainer	
D E C E M B E R	8	Mr. Perfect	A. Ramesh Babu	Annup Sa. Ra. Govind, Shalini Vadnikatti, Sangeetha, Ramesh Bhat, Bullet Prakash	Produced by	
D E C E M B E R	8	Smuggler	Priya Hassan	Priya Hassan, Suman, Shayaji Shinde, Ravi Kale	Produced by Rainbow Groups	
D E C E M B E R	8	Women's Day	Isha	Saikumar, Prakash Siddhi, Soorya, Saniha Yadav, Rippu Daman Singh, Akshara, Sneha, Monika	Produced by RK Motion Pictures	
D E C E M B E R	15	Illa	Raj Prabhu	Raj Prabhu	Produced by Sushanth Talkies	
D E C E M B E R	15	Mooka Hakki	Neenasam Manju	Sathish Kumar, Pooja S. M.	Produced by Heeralal Movies	
D E C E M B E R	21	Anjani Putra	A. Harsha	Puneeth Rajkumar, Rashmika Mandanna, Ramya Krishnan, P. Ravishankar, Mukesh Tiwari, Chikkanna	Produced by MNK Movies and Jayashreedevi Productions	
D E C E M B E R	22	Railway Children	Prithvi Konanur	Yash Shetty, Manohara, Srikanth, Narasappa	Produced by Anjali Nayak	
D E C E M B E R	22	Tora Tora	Harsh Gowda	Sanath, Siddhu Moolimani, Saniha Yadav, Nataraj. L, Pooja Raju	Produced by Mayavi Productions	
D E C E M B E R	29	Aavahayami	Girish Kumar. B	Vijay Raj, Mouna Shree, Dileep Raj	Produced by Wood Creepers & Friends	
D E C E M B E R	29	Chamak	Simple Suni	Ganesh, Rashmika Mandanna, Sadhu Kokila	Produced by Crystal Park Cinemas	
