= Rangappa Hogbitna =

- Directed by: M. L. Prasanna
- Written by: M. L. Prasanna
- Based on: Death at a Funeral (2010) by Neil LaBute
- Produced by: Confident Films, Mahesh Kothari
- Starring: Ramesh Aravind; Sanjjana; Ravikiran; Ninasam Sathish
- Cinematography: A. C. Mahendran
- Edited by: Harsha
- Music by: M. L. Prasanna
- Production company: Shantha Enterprises
- Release date: 11 February 2011
- Running time: 122 minutes
- Country: India
- Language: Kannada

Rangappa Hogbitna is a 2011 Indian Kannada comedy film directed and written by M. L. Prasanna. The film stars Ramesh Aravind and Sanjjana in the lead roles. The story is inspired by the Hollywood comedy film Death at a Funeral (2010), itself a remake of the 2007 film of the same name. The film is produced by Mahesh Kothari under Shanta Enterprises banner. M L Prasanna himself has composed the music.

== Plot ==
The film is a laugh riot telling the story of an almost dying old man named Rangappa.

== Cast ==
- Ramesh Aravind as Ramesh
- Sanjjana as Sneha, Ramesh's wife
- Ravikiran as Suresh, Ramesh's brother
- Mandeep Roy a doctor
- Sihi Kahi Chandru
- K. V. Manjayya as Raju, Ramesh's uncle
- Layendra Kokila as Venkata
- Girish Bhat
- Sanchari Vijay as Krishna
- Sathish Ninasam as Shalini's lover
- NGEF Manju

== Soundtrack ==
- "Rangappa Hogbitna" - Singer :Hemanth Kumar, Music & lyrics : M. L. Prasanna

== Reception ==
=== Critical response ===
A critic from Bangalore Mirror wrote "Most of the actors have done justice to their roles; SihiKahi Chandru and Layendra stand out. The background score that often tries to force laughter on the audience is annoying.No doubt, the film is made on shoe-string budget. Good for one watch on the big screen, but it will be a great fodder for film-starved television channels". Sunayana Suresh from DNA wrote "One’s heart goes out to Ramesh Arvind, whose comic timing and antics seem to be like a lone warrior in a battle. Makers like this need to be reprimanded, as they’ve fooled the audiences in the cinema halls with a sorry excuse for a film and have made their money on the sly through their television rights. Tsk tsk!". A critic from NDTV wrote "Ramesh Arvind as usual has given his best, but it is glamorous Sanjjana who impresses in the role of a housewife. Veteran actors Sihi Kahi Chandru, Mandeep Rai and Layendra impress in their respective roles. Rangappa Hogbitnaa is a good one-time watch". B S Srivani from Deccan Herald wrote "Prasanna manages to deliver through most of the film, though Cajetan Dias’ background score spoils the impact. Sihi Kahi Chandru as the father of two daughters and a son who comes to a bitter realisation is first class. Another surprise is Sanjana who is finally at ease while performing - another potential to be realised here. Recommended one-time watch minus the thinking cap".
