= Filmfare Critics Award for Best Actor – Kannada =

Indian annual film award

- Awarded for: Best performance by an actor in Kannada films
- Country: India
- Presented by: Filmfare
- First award: 2015
- Currently held by: Gowrishankar for Kerebete (2024)

The Filmfare Critics Award for Best Actor – Kannada is given by Filmfare as part of its annual Filmfare Awards South for Kannada films. The award is given by a chosen jury of critics assigned.

== Winners ==
Year	Actor	Role	Film	Ref.
2015	Sanchari Vijay	Madesha / Vidya	Naanu Avanalla...Avalu	
2016	Rakshit Shetty	Karna	Kirik Party	
2017	Dhananjaya	Allama Prabhu	Allama	
2018	Sathish Ninasam	Siddhegowda	Ayogya	
2019	AWARDS FUNCTION WAS SUSPENDED DUE TO COVID-19 PANDEMIC			
2020–21	Darling Krishna	Aditya	Love Mocktail	
2022	Naveen Shankar	Aadi	Dharani Mandala Madhyadolage	
2023	Poornachandra Mysore	Poorna	Orchestra Mysuru	
2024	Gowrishankar SRG	Naga	Kerebete	

== See also ==
- Filmfare Critics Award for Best Actress – Kannada
