= Sancharam =

Sancharam may refer to:

- Sancharam (film) or The Journey, a 2004 Indian Malayalam film by Ligy J. Pulleppally
- Sancharam (TV series), an Indian travelogue program

== See also ==
- Sanchari (disambiguation)
