= Sanchari Theatre =

Cultural organization in Bangalore, India

Sanchari Theatre Logo

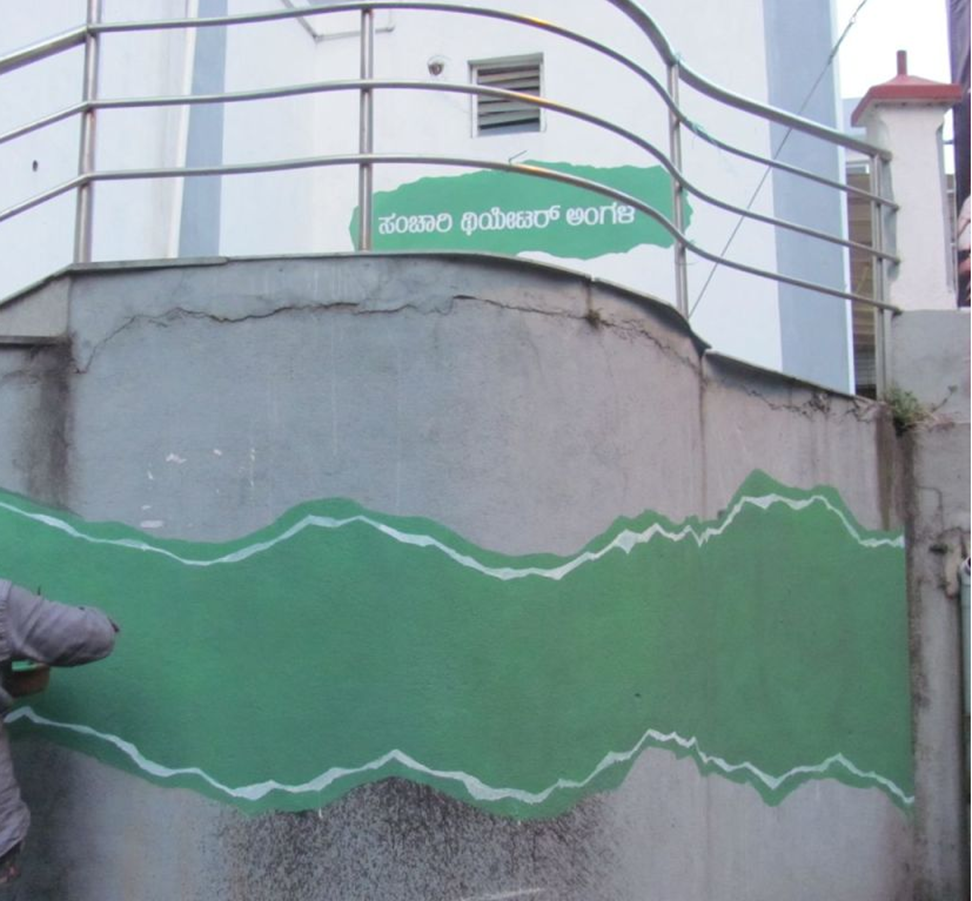
Sanchari Theatre Office

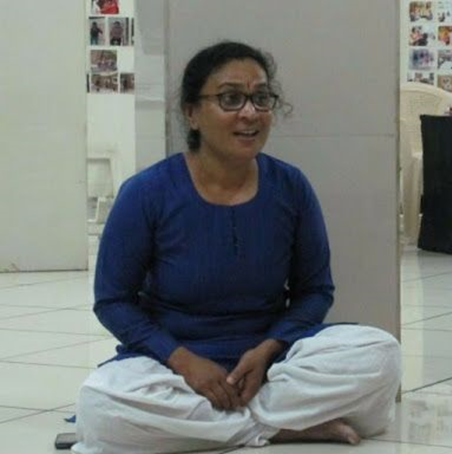
Mangala N - Founder and Director, Sanchari Theatre

Sanchari Theatre (Kannada: Uಸಂಚಾರಿ ಥಿಯೇಟರ್) is a cultural organization located in Bengaluru, Karnataka, India. Sanchari Theatre is a drama troupe which is dedicated to the growth of drama. "Sanchari" is one of the Bhavas. Bhava or to emote is the 'becoming'. Sanchari Bhavas are those always crossing feelings which are ancillary to a permanent mood. Thus the name Sanchari Theatre is fabricated. Sanchari is the brainchild of acclaimed dramatists N. Mangala, Rangayana Raghu and Gajanana T Naik. Mangala and Rangayana Raghu were resident actors of Rangayana before starting Sanchari Theatre. Sanchari produced plays that included Kannada writers and Kannada translations of plays written by William Shakespeare and other foreign writers.

== History ==
Sanchari Theatre was established in the year 2004 for the promotion of stage crafts and dramas. Since then continuously knitted and performed number of dramas. N. Mangala and Gajanana T Naik looks after daily activities of Sanchari Theatre. Troupe has more than 50 actors. Sanchari Theatre performed its dramas in various places across India. Sanchari Theatre conducts annual theatre workshops for interested candidates. Sanchari also conducts in-house and residential workshops for children in the memory of B. V. Karanth and Prema Karanth. Different kinds of workshops are conducted based on age groups. To name them: PoorvaRanga, AdiRanga, BalaRanga and ShishuRanga. As part of these workshops, number of plays have resulted. Some of the visiting faculty to Sanchari Theatre include Prasanna, Sihi Kahi Chandru, Arun Sagar and Rangayana Raghu. In 2014, the institution celebrated its 10th anniversary as “Sanchari Sadagara” by performing 10 plays in 10 days. Sanchari celebrated 15th anniversary on 3 August 2020 by performing a play per month throughout the year and also came up with an experiment of publishing storytelling videos in social media.

== Dramas Performed by Sanchari Theatre ==
To list some of the dramas performed by Sanchari Theatre...

- Urmila
- Arahanta
- Kamalamani Kamidi Kalyana
- Kailasam Keechaka
- Dhareyolagina Rajakarana
- Narigaligeke Kodilla
- Pinocchio
- Vanity Bag
- Sridevi Mahathme
- No Presents Please
- Venicina Vyapara
- Nidranagari
- Bhagavadajukeeya
- Halliyura Hammeera
- Maama Moshi
- Mudi Dore mathu moovaru makkalu
- Giddu Tailor Chaddi Specialist
- Ogatina Raani
- Ghama Ghama Bhavana.
- Rangajangamana Sthavara
- Clean And Clear, Paayakhane

and many more......

== Achievements ==
1. Sanchari actor Sanchari Vijay won the Best Actor 2014 National Award for his acting in the film Naanu Avanalla...Avalu.
2. Sanchari Theatre contributed many actors to Theatre, film industry and TV.
3. Sanchari Theatre continuously engaged in special experiments in theatre.

== See also ==
- B. V. Karanth
- Rangayana Raghu
- Sanchari Vijay
