= Krishna Tulasi =

Indian Kannada-language romantic drama film by Suresh Nayak

- Film poster
- Directed by: Sukesh Nayak
- Produced by: M. Narayanaswamy
- Starring: Sanchari Vijay; Meghashree
- Music by: Kiran Ravindranath
- Production company: Annapoorneshwari Cine Creations
- Release date: 20 April 2018
- Country: India
- Language: Kannada

Krishna Tulasi is a 2018 Indian Kannada-language romantic drama film directed by newcomer Sukesh Nayak.

== Plot ==
Krishna (Sanchari Vijay), a visually impaired man, moves to Mysuru after he gets a job at the university. He befriends Tulasi (Meghashree), a dubbing artiste who is also visually impaired, takes the same bus as he does. Neither of them realizes that the other is person is also visually impaired. Whether or not they figure this out and fall in love forms the rest of the story.

== Cast ==
- Sanchari Vijay as Krishna
- Meghashree as Tulasi
- Kuri Pratap
- Tabla Nani
- Ramesh Bhat
- Suchendra Prasad
- Padmaja Rao

== Soundtrack ==
The songs were composed by Kiran Ravindranath.

- "Sogasaagi" – Kiran Ravindranath
- "Yeno Hosa Nantu" – Armaan Malik
- "Lokana Nammange" – Tippu
- "Khali Kanninali" – Anuradha Bhat, Rajesh Krishnan
- "Kandey Iralilla" – Varun Pradeep

== Release ==
The Times of India gave the film three out of five stars and wrote that "Go ahead, watch Krishna Tulasi if you like simple unadulterated romance that comes straight from the heart".
