= Riktha =

- Directed by: Amruth Kumar
- Written by: Amruth Kumar
- Screenplay by: Amruth Kumar
- Story by: Amruth Kumar
- Produced by: G. Arun Kumar
- Starring: Sanchari Vijay; Vakdevi Advika; Ramya Varshini
- Cinematography: Muralidhar
- Edited by: M. Varman
- Music by: Rocky Sonu
- Production company: Lakshmi Hayagreeva Combines
- Release date: January 20, 2017
- Country: India
- Language: Kannada

Riktha is a 2017 Indian Kannada comedy horror film directed by debutante Amruth Kumar and produced by G. Arun Kumar. The film features Sanchari Vijay donning four different roles: a child, a lover, a drunkard and a comedian. Vagdevi Advika and Ramya Varshini also feature in the lead roles. The film's music is composed by Rocky Sonu and the cinematography is by Muralidhar.

== Cast ==
- Sanchari Vijay
- Vagdevi Advika
- Ramya Varshini
- Madesh Neenasam
- Abhishek
- Jagadish
- Prasad

== Soundtrack ==
Debutante composer Rocky Sonu has composed for original score and soundtracks of the film. Actor Sanchari Vijay recorded his first song for the film.

Track listing
No.	Title	Singer(s)	Length
1.	"Missdu What To Do"	Rocky Sonu	04:24
2.	"Bari Kannalle"	Rajesh Krishnan	03:58
3.	"Aval Eval"	Rocky Sonu	03:08
4.	"Dumtaka"	Sanchari Vijay	03:08
Total length:			21:48
