= Pathibeku.com =

- Release poster
- Directed by: Rakesh
- Starring: Sheethal Shetty; Aaru Gowda; Krishna Adiga
- Cinematography: Yogi
- Edited by: Vijay M Kumar
- Music by: Kaushik Harsha
- Release date: 7 September 2018
- Country: India
- Language: Kannada

Pathibeku.com is a 2018 Indian Kannada-language drama film directed by Rakesh and produced by Rakesh, Srinivas and Manjunath. It stars Sheethal Shetty, Aaru Gowda, Krishna Adiga, Harini and Rockline Sudhakar. It was released theatrically on 7 September 2018.

== Cast ==
- Sheethal Shetty
- Arun Gowda
- Krishna Adiga
- Harini
- Rockline Sudhakar

== Reception ==
Vivek MV of Deccan Herald wrote "Thankfully, director Rakesh empathises with the urgent need of the audience to walk out of the theatre and ends the film in a hurry. Sheetal's acting is the only saving grace here. Pathibeku.com is like a website that takes ages to load and eventuall".? A. Sharadhaa from The New Indian Express says "Pathibeku.com is a cinematic experiment which fails to explore the nuances of match-making, and in turn results in an unfaithful trial". Sunayana Suresh from The Times of India wrote "Pathibeku.com is a sincere attempt at a female-oriented romcom with a series of comedy of errors. The film lags at times and might not be the most technically competent one, but it still has its heart in its place and can entertain if you are the sort who likes to see the woman at the helm of the affairs". A reviewer from Asianet News wrote "Interesting concept is the lifeblood of the film. Above all, this is a comedy movie. Its advantage is the timing and acting of the artists to take the audience by the hand".
