= Putani Safari =

- Directed by: Ravindra Venshi
- Written by: Ravindra Venshi
- Screenplay by: Ravindra Venshi
- Story by: Ravindra Venshi
- Produced by: B. S. Chandra Shekar
- Cinematography: Jeevan Gowda
- Edited by: C. Ravichandran
- Music by: Veer Samarth
- Production companies: SWARNA GANGA FILMS, FRIENDS FILM FACTORY
- Distributed by: Shraddha Productions
- Release date: 14 July 2017
- Running time: 133 minutes
- Country: India
- Language: Kannada

Putani Safari [English: Kids safari, ಕನ್ನಡ : ಪುಟಾಣಿ ಸಫಾರಿ] is a 2017 Indian Kannada language children's film directed by Ravindra Venshi. It stars master Rakin, Master Rajiv, Manish, SahanaShree, Kailash Baby Manasa, Baby Brinda, Master Bhuvan Hiregoudar, Santosh Davanagere, Martesh, M. K. Jagadish, Harish Kundur, Mirle Manju, All the best Khadar, Vijaya Heggodu and Sulochana in the leading roles. The background score and soundtrack was composed by Veer Samarth. The lyrics were penned by Yogaraj Bhat and cinematography was by Jeevan Gowda. The film was well received by critics and audiences, earning the film and its actors accolades, it was declared a "surprise hit" by running houseful shows.

== Plot ==
Putani Safari is a story about two little boys who were reared in different environments. It is about their struggle to overcome the dangers in a forest. Rohit is a child who lives in the city, his parents have blessed him with all riches and want him to realize how fortunate he is. Rohit's parents want him to be well educated and use all the opportunities available in the city and want him to be a class topper. But Rohit is always distracted in watching TV and playing with friends. Rohit bargains his way that if he becomes a class topper again, they should take him on a wild animal safari. Siddesha is a child born to parents of a forest tribe, he is an ambitious child who wants to go school and be educated, but his parents don't believe in him. Siddesh's mother sends him on an errand to sell guavas near the school. Siddesh offers a guava to a student in return for her to teach him to read and write. His mother observes his ability to learn on his own and tries to enroll him in school. But her husband robs her savings and spends them on elixir. Poor Siddesh finds out about this and runs into the forest to hide his tears. Rohit and his parents call on the forest management. On their forest ride an elephant attacks them, and Rohit is separated from his parents. He falls down a mountain slope, hits his head and lies unconscious there. Siddesh finds Rohit and together they fight the adventures on their safari. It is as if the Goddess of the forest teaches them what life is.

== Cast ==
- Manish Ballal as Rajesh
- Sahanashree as Prathibha
- Kailash TV as Dare Devil Malinga
- Master Rajiv Pratham as Rohit
- Master Rakin Krishna as Siddesha
- Althe best Khadar as Marappa
- Vijaya Neenasam Heggodu as Muniyamma
- Jagadish M. K. as Comrade Harish
- Swathi Shimoga as Saroja
- Baby Manasa as Chaitra
- Baby Brinda as Vishala
- Sulochana as Ningamma
- Santosh Davanagere as Muni
- Martesh as Malya
- Shivanand as Madeva
- Mirle Manjunath as Bharama
- Venkatesh Babu as Bharama

== Production ==
=== Pre-production ===
Director Ravindra Venshi has conceived the idea of Putani Safari two year earlier, i.e. in 2014. But after so many hurdles, the script was completed, but due to financial matters, the project got shelved for two years. Afterwards, B. S. Chandrashekar was introduced by M. K. Jagadish, co producer to the director, upon hearing the concept, B. S. Chandrashekar agreed to produce the film under his banner Swarnaganga films. Initial pre-production activities like searching for locations began on 1 July 2016 even though story and screenplay was ready for production by January 2016. Putani Safari team went for searching greenery with wet condition forest locations for shooting, they selected places like Sirsi, Siddapura, before shooting they shot animals stills and captured the videos of the animals like Lion, Elephant, Tigers etc. in the protected Forests like Bannerghatta National Park, Bandipur, Dubare, Biligiriranga Hills, K. Gudi etc.

=== Filming ===
Principal photography started in the first week of September 2016 in Bangalore. Slum scenes, Rohit's Bangalore city scenes were completed in about a week and later after taking a break of one week, second schedule started in Siddapura and Sirsi for 22 days. Remaining shooting work was completed in Bangalore after that.

== Soundtrack ==
Putani Safari

Soundtrack album by Veer Samarth
- Released: 2017
- Genre: Feature film soundtrack
- Language: Kannada
- Label: Lahari Music
- Producer: Veer Samarth

The film's score and soundtrack was composed by Veer Samarth.

Tracklist
No.	Title	Singer(s)	Length
1.	"Baitiraa Baree Baitiraa"	Arnav Veer Samarth, Shreyas Veer Samarth, M. R. Niharika, Siri Ramachandra	4:20 minutes
