= 6ne Maili =

- Directed by: See Ni
- Written by: See Ni
- Produced by: B.S. Shailesh Kumar
- Starring: Sanchari Vijay; RJ Nethra
- Cinematography: Parmesh C.M.
- Edited by: Mahesh S.
- Music by: Sai Kiran
- Release date: 6 July 2018
- Country: India
- Language: Kannada

6ne Maili (transl. 6th Mile) is a 2018 Kannada-language thriller film directed by See Ni and starring Sanchari Vijay and RJ Nethra.

== Cast ==
- Sanchari Vijay as Arjun
- RJ Nethra
- RJ Sudesh
- Jhavi Jyoti
- Hemanth Sushil as Purshi
- Vikas Vasistha as Ajith
- Nagraj Pattar as Ayappa
- Madhu Shankar as Jaggi
- Gokul Chakravarthy as Appanna
- Shobhan Babu as Pammi

== Production ==
Sanchari Vijay and RJ Nethra were cast in the lead roles in a film based on trekking. The film is inspired by the true story that trekkers go missing at 6ne Maili, Dhaulagiri. The film is set in the Western Ghats. The six in the name also refers to the six characters in the film.

== Soundtrack ==
The film has a single song is the death metal title track sung by Vasishta N. Simha.

== Release ==
A critic from The Deccan Chronicle gave the film a rating of one-half out of five stars and wrote that "Well, even the award winning actor fails with this one, and the two radio jockeys who have turned actors with this one are forgettable, as is the tale.". The News Minute wrote that "Because there's no complexity or nuance to the villains, the engaging setup of the first half falls into a predictable and flat second half, as the director can't seem to find a way to keep the tension building". The New Indian Express wrote that "The destination to 6ne Maili is beautiful, however, the journey with few twists and turns is quite unsettling". Firstpost gave the film a rating of 1/2 out of five and stated that "6ne Maili takes you to one of the most picturesque locations during the night hours and leaves you with an aching sensation that it could have been so much more, and a lot more amazing even, in the hands of a finer director". The movie is available on OTT platform Eros Now
