= Varthamana =

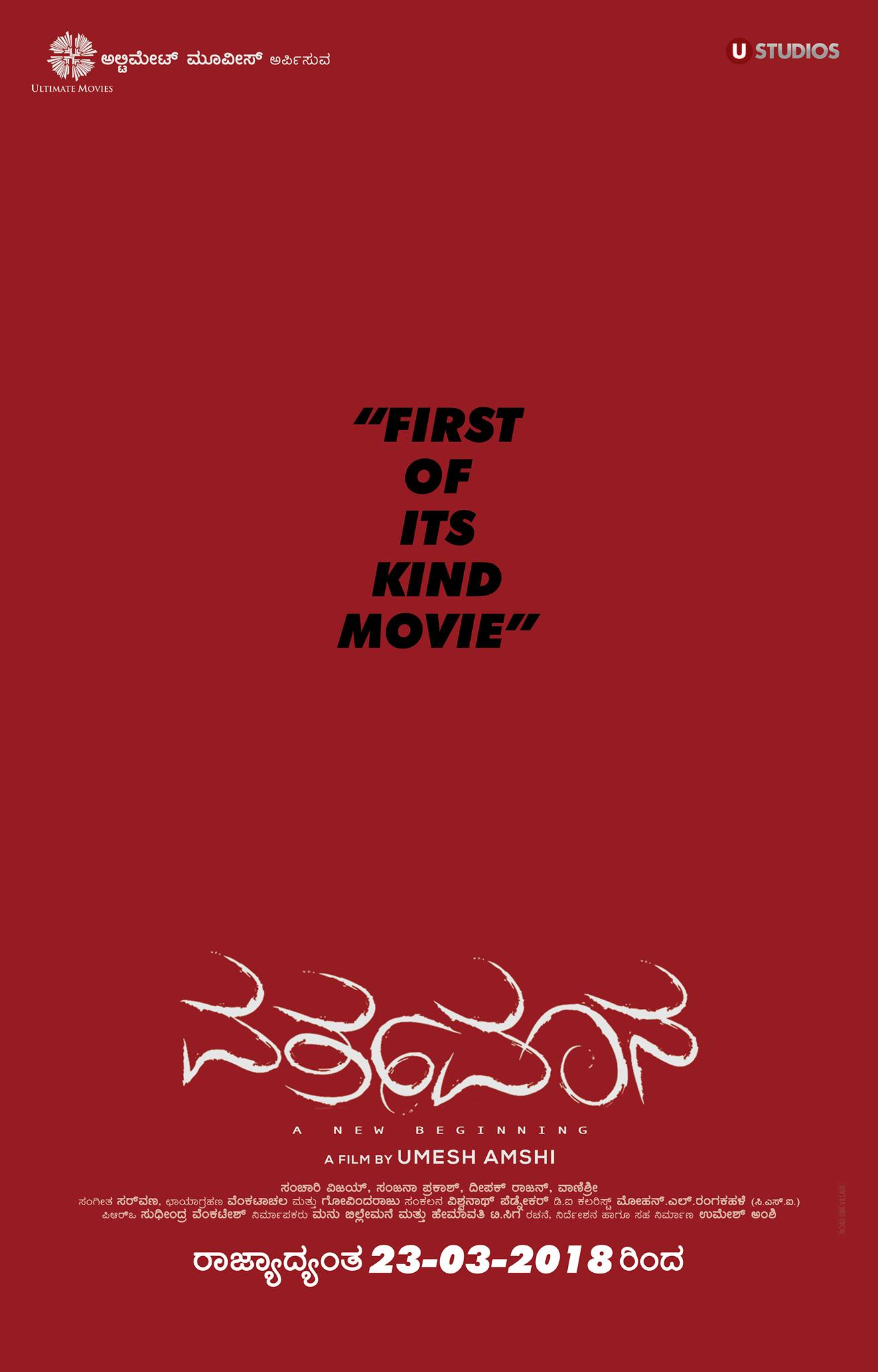
- Movie poster
- Directed by: Umesh Amshi
- Written by: Umesh Amshi
- Produced by: Manu Bellimane and Hemavathi T.siga
- Starring: Sanchari Vijay; Sanjana Prakash
- Music by: Sarvanaa
- Release date: 2018
- Country: India
- Language: Kannada

Varthamana (2018) is a Kannada Language film written and directed by Umesh Amshi, and produced by Ultimate Movies by Manu Bellimane and Hemavathi T.siga.

Varthamana stars Sanchari Vijay and Sanjana Prakash . The cinematography was done by Govind and Venkatachala and music was composed by Sarvanaa. It revolves around the Emotional and Psychical aspects of a protagonist named Ananth. He starts living in an illusionary world realising its all happening in reality.

== Plot ==
Ananth a man of ideals commits a crime and looks for a man called Adarsh (Ideal). Ananth's guilty consciousness and his psychological state blur the line between reality and illusion. Sometimes he is unaware of what's happening in his life. As a parallel, Siddarth, a killer by profession wants to quit his job and be a free man. To be a free man he has to kill one more man. Who is that man whom he has to kill? Does he kill him? These questions pose symbolic questions such the confusions about identity of modern man. Thus, the movie narrates the story through colors and imagery. The movie deals with present-day man's confusion about what to do (in life) & how to do in a symbolic way.

== Production ==
In December 2015, Sanchari Vijay signed on to appear in Varthamana . The film was revealed to have different shades of characterization with a non-linear story telling pattern and claimed to be the first avant-garde Kannada feature film. The films principal shooting began during November 2015 As the movie revolves around past and present, it has been made in a staggered fashion, over a period of 2 years.

== Cast ==
- Sanchari Vijay
- Sanjana Prakash
- Deepak
- Vanishri
- Pondsy Anthony
- Sapnaraj
- Shanaaya Daphne

== Critical reception ==
IndiaGlitz called it "A very different Experiment genre". Times of India stated that "The film is definitely different from what the industry has seen so far in recent times. The non-liner screenplay is much like a stream of consciousness novel". While Leading Kannada Daily Vijayakarnataka called the film a cult cinema with new techniques of film making and the first of its in the Indian Cinema.

== Release ==
The Film released across Karnataka with positive reviews on the 6th of April, 2018.
