= Sanchari Vijay =

Indian theatre and film actor (1983–2021)

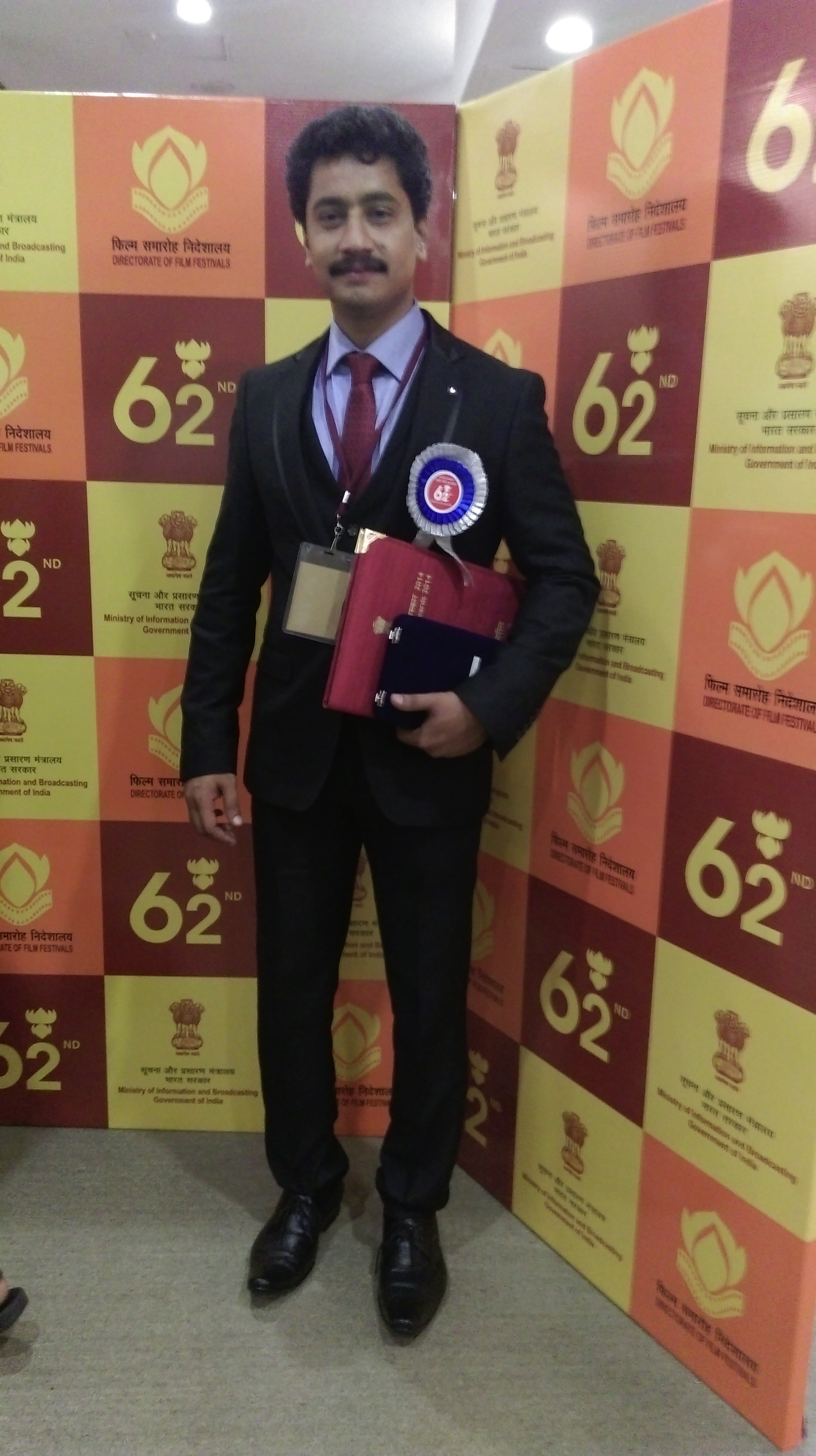
- Vijay at 62nd National Film Awards ceremony in 2015.
- Born: Vijay Kumar Basavarajaiah; 17 July 1983; Panchanahalli, Chikmagalur, Karnataka, India
- Died: 15 June 2021 (aged 37); Bengaluru, Karnataka, India
- Education: B.M.S. Institute of Technology and Management, B.M.S. College of Engineering
- Occupation: Actor
- Years active: 2007–2021
- Notable work: Naanu Avanalla...Avalu

Vijay Kumar Basavarajaiah (17 July 1983 – 15 June 2021), known by his stage name Sanchari Vijay, was an Indian actor known for his work in Kannada cinema. He began his career as a stage actor. He trained on stage from Sanchari Theatre, a culture centre with its own drama troupe, based in Bangalore.

For his portrayal of a transgender person in the Kannada film Naanu Avanalla...Avalu (2014), Vijay was awarded the National Film Award for Best Actor at the 62nd National Film Awards. He also received the Karnataka State Film Award for Best Actor and the Filmfare Critics Award for Best Actor – Kannada for the performance. He received praise for his performances in Killing Veerappan (2016) and Nathicharami (2018). In a career spanning ten years, he appeared in 25 films, before his death from a motorcycle crash in 2021.

== Early life ==
Vijay was born on 18 July 1983 in Panchanahalli, a village in Kadur taluk of Karnataka's Chikmagalur district. His father Basavarajaiah was an actor and musician and mother Gowramma, a nurse and folk singer. Vijay was the younger of two children; he had an older brother, Siddesh. Vijay's parents died when he was a teenager; his mother from jaundice and father soon after. To help fund his brother's education, Vijay took up a job at a hotel in Bangalore, where he washed utensils. After his brother began working, Vijay completed his pre-university course, before enrolling in B.M.S. College of Engineering, to study engineering. During this time, he was drawn towards stage acting and joined Sanchari Theatre. After graduating, Vijay began working as a lecturer in a college teaching computer science to diploma students. He also began acting in television soap operas while also remaining active on stage.

As a child, Vijay played minor roles on stage. In a 2017 interview, he recalled, "I had never imagined that I will end up being an actor. Yes, I did have some qualities like enacting my favourite roles after watching a film or a drama, but all of this was in the past, as later, I started getting serious about education. In fact, even while studying, my friends would notice my acting skills."

== Career ==
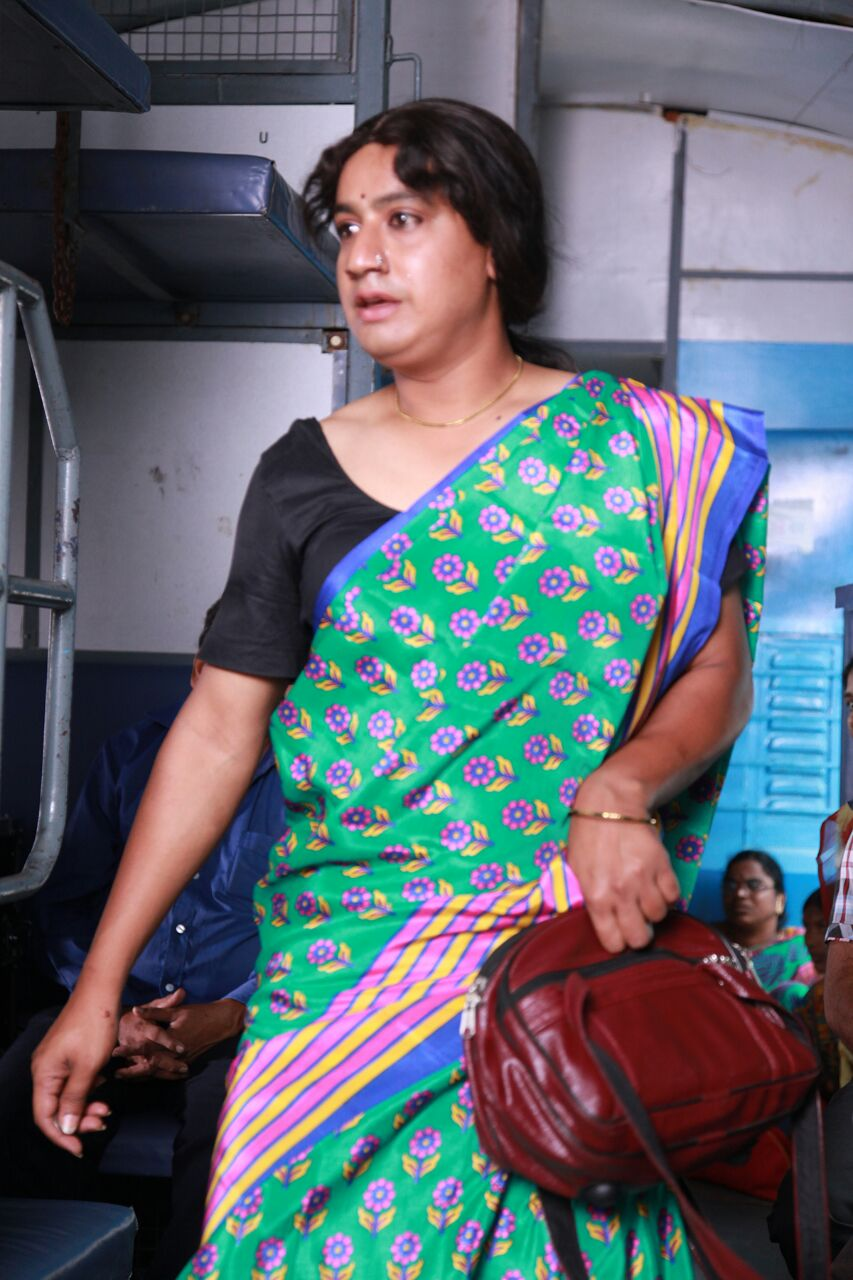
Vijay as a transgender character in Naanu Avanalla...Avalu, which won him the Best Actor Award at the 62nd National Film Awards.

Vijay made his debut in films with the 2011 Kannada film Rangappa Hogbitna. He received recognition for his performance in his next film Dasavala in which he played a disabled boy. Shyam Prasad S. of Bangalore Mirror wrote, "...Vijay is undoubtedly the best performer. He is unbelievably real in the role and deserves all the praise." He was later cast in Oggarane (2014) and as lead actor subsequently in Harivu (2014). In Harivu, he played a farmer who travels to Bangalore and struggles to treat his terminally-ill son.

In Naanu Avanalla...Avalu (2015), his portrayal of a transgender person won him the Best Actor Award at the 62nd National Film Awards. With the award win, Vijay became the third actor after M. V. Vasudeva Rao and Charuhasan to win the National Award for Best Actor for performing in a Kannada film. At the same awards, Harivu won the award for Best Feature Film in Kannada.

In Nathicharami (2018), a film that explores a widow's sexuality, Vijay played Suresh, a middle-aged man, a character with "two very different shades", troubled by an unhappy marriage. In Krishna Tulasi (2018), he played a visually impaired tourist guide. A Sharadhaa of the New Indian Express called it one of his "best performance" and wrote, "He clearly gets into the character of a blind man in love, delivering a powerful performance." The News Minute wrote, "Sanchari Vijay pulls off a strong performance, capturing the texture of a variety of emotions." In Aatakkuntu Lekkakkilla (2019), Vijay played a schizophrenia patient who suspects his wife of infidelity. In commercial films 6ne Maili (2018) and Gentleman (2020), he played a cop.

Vijay's upcoming releases include Melobba Mayavi, a film based on organized crime in the coastal Karnataka region. In Taledanda, he plays Kunnegowda, a boy obsessed with trees and plants, belonging to the Soliga tribe of South Karnataka. In the psychological thriller Phirangipura, he portrays three different shades depicting a person's transition from childhood to old age as he travels from Bengaluru to Rajasthan. His Puksatte Lifu, "realistic look at life around us", directed by Aravind Kuplikar, completed filming in 2019.

== Death ==
Vijay was involved in a motorcycle accident where he was riding-pillion at 11:45 p.m. (IST) on 12 June 2021 in Bengaluru. The motorcycle, a Yamaha FZ1, skidded and hit a light post in the JP Nagar locality of Bengaluru. Vijay suffered severe brain injuries from the accident and was operated on at the Apollo hospital in the city. A doctor was quoted as saying, "As he had [a] blood clot in the brain, we have performed...surgery, the next 48 hours are going to be critical." A CT scan of Vijay's brain reportedly showed "very severe brain injury in addition to a subdural hematoma". The surgery was performed to remove the brain hemorrhage. Apnea tests to diagnose brain death were performed at 12.25 p.m. and 7.50 p.m. (IST) the following day, which was confirmed later that evening. Vijay was pronounced dead at 3:34 a.m. (IST) on 15 June. Both Kidneys, Liver, Heart Valves And Corneas were donated. His body was kept for public viewing between 6 a.m. and 10 a.m. (IST) in Ravindra Kalakshetra that day before being taken to his hometown Panchanahalli. He was cremated with full state police honours there, with brother Siddesh performing the last rites.

== Filmography ==
Key
†	Denotes films that have not yet been released

List of films and roles
Year	Title	Role(s)	Notes	Ref.
2011	Rangappa Hogbitna	Krishna		
2013	Dasavala	Disabled boy		
2014	Harivu	Farmer		
2014	Oggarane	Rama		
2014	Ulavacharu Biryani	Rama	Telugu film	
2014	Un Samayal Arayil	Rama	Tamil film	
2015	Naanu Avanalla...Avalu	Madesha/Vidya	*National Film Award for Best Actor; *Karnataka State Film Award for Best Actor; *Filmfare Critics Award for Best Actor – Kannada	
2016	Killing Veerappan	STF Officer Gopal	Nominated—SIIMA Award for Best Actor in a Supporting Role – Kannada	
2016	Sipaayi	Manju		
2016	Godhi Banna Sadharana Mykattu		Cameo appearance	
2017	Riktha	Riktha	Also playback singer for song "Dumtaka"	
2017	Allama	Basava		
2017	Maarikondavaru			
2017	Nan Magale Heroine	Vijay		
2017	Avyaktha	Rajashekhar	Short film	
2018	Varthamana	Ananth		
2018	Krishna Tulasi	Krishna		
2018	6ne Maili	Arjun		
2018	Padarasa	Padarasa		
2018	Nathicharami	Suresh		
2018	Sri Guru Kotturesha	Akbar		
2019	Aduva Gombe	Madhava		
2019	Aatakkuntu Lekkakkilla	Purushotham		
2020	Gentleman	Shivmurthy		
2020	ACT 1978	Bheemeshwar Pandey	Karnataka State Jury's Special Award (Posthumous award)	
2021	Lanke	Dharma	Posthumously released	
2021	Puksatte Lifu	Shahjahan	Posthumously released	
2022	Taledanda	Kunnegowda "Kunna"	Karnataka State Jury's Special Award (Posthumous award); Posthumously released	
2022	Melobba Mayavi	Iruve	Posthumously released	
