= 70th Filmfare Awards South =

2026 film awards event in Kerala, India

- Awarded for: Best of films of 2024
- Presented by: Filmfare
- Announced on: 12 February 2026 (nominations)
- Presented on: 21 February 2026
- Site: Adlux International Convention Centre, Kochi, Kerala, India
- Hosted by: Mithun Ramesh; Ranjini Haridas; Vishnu Warrier
- Organized by: The Times Group
- Magazine issue: Filmfare
- Official website: Official website

Highlights
- Best Film: Pushpa 2: The Rule (Telugu); Amaran (Tamil); Manjummel Boys (Malayalam); Shakhahaari (Kannada)
- Lifetime achievement: Sreenivasan; Sreekumaran Thampi
- Most awards: Amaran (8)
- Most nominations: Amaran (10)

Television coverage
- Channel: Zee Telugu (Telugu); Zee Tamil (Tamil); Zee Keralam (Malayalam); Zee Kannada (Kannada)
- Network: Zee Entertainment Enterprises

The 70th Filmfare Awards South is an awards event that recognised and honoured the best films and performances from the Telugu, Tamil, Malayalam and Kannada films and music released in 2024 along with special honours for lifetime contributions and few special awards. The nominations were announced on 11 February 2026 and took place in Kochi, Kerala, India on 21 February 2026. The event made its debut in Kochi, Kerala after being held in Chennai, Hyderabad and Bengaluru. Mithun Ramesh, Ranjini Haridas and Vishnu Warrier have hosted the event.

Amaran is the most awarded film with eight awards, followed by Aadujeevitham and Pushpa 2: The Rule with five each, Meiyazhagan with four, and Kishkindha Kaandam and Krishnam Pranaya Sakhi with three each. Pushpa 2: The Rule is the most awarded Telugu film. Amaran is the most awarded Tamil film. Aadujeevitham is the most awarded Malayalam film. Krishnam Pranaya Sakhi is the most awarded Kannada film.

Amaran is the only film to have two lead acting role awards won by Sivakarthikeyan (Best Actor – Tamil) and Sai Pallavi (Best Actress – Tamil). "Chuttamalle" (from Devara: Part 1), "Dwapara" (from Krishnam Pranaya Sakhi), "Hey Minnale" (from Amaran), "Kurchi Madathapetti" (from Guntur Kaaram) and "Periyone" (from Aadujeevitham) are the most awarded songs with two wins each.

Amitabh Bachchan is the oldest winner, whereas, Sreekumaran Thampi is the oldest winner including non-competitive awards.

== Winners and nominees ==
Winners are listed first, highlighted in boldface.

=== Main awards ===
==== Kannada cinema ====
Best Film	Best Director
**Shakhahaari – Rajesh Keelambi and Ranjini Prasanna, producers**; Bagheera – Vijay Kiragandur, producer; Bheema – Krishna Sartak and Jagadeesh Gowda, producers; Blink – Ravichandra A. J, producer; Hadinelentu – Prithvi Konanur and Tejaswi Konanur, producers; Krishnam Pranaya Sakhi – Prashanth G. Rudrappa, producers	**Prithvi Konanur – Hadinelentu**; Duniya Vijay – Bheema; Rajguru B – Kerebete; Sandeep Sunkad – Shakhahaari; Srinidhi Bengaluru – Blink; Utsav Gonwar – Photo
Best Actor	Best Actress
**Sriimurali** **– Bagheera as Vedanth Prabhakar / Bagheera**; Duniya Vijay – Bheema as Bheema; Ganesh – Krishnam Pranaya Sakhi as Krishna; Rangayana Raghu – Shakhahaari as Subbanna Bhatta; Shiva Rajkumar – Bhairathi Ranagal as Bhairathi Ranagal; Sudeepa – Max as Arjun Mahakshay / Max	**Akshatha Pandavapura – Koli Esru as Hucchheeri**; Ankita Amar – Ibbani Tabbida Ileyali as Anahita Madhumita Banarjee; Bindu Shivaram – Kerebete as Meena; Chaithra J Achar – Blink as Devaki; Roshni Prakash – Murphy as Janani; Rukmini Vasanth – Bagheera as Dr. Sneha
Best Supporting Actor	Best Supporting Actress
**Gopalkrishna Deshpande – Blink as Gopal Krishna**; Gopalkrishna Deshpande – Shakhahaari as Mallikarjuna Hiremath; Jahangir M. S. – Photo as Husenappa; Nagendra Shah – Maryade Prashne; Prabhu Mundkur – Maryade Prashne as Rocky; Prakash Raj – Bagheera as Guru; Raj B. Shetty – Roopanthara as Goon	**Priya Shathamarshan – Bheema as Girija**; Apeksha Choranahalli – Koli Esru as Lachchu; Harini Shreekanth – Kerebete as Gowrakka; Lekha Naidu – Roopanthara as Hanumakka; Rekha Kudligi – Hadinelentu as Seetha; Sandhya Arekere – Photo as Gangamma
Best Music Director	Best Lyricist
**Arjun Janya – Krishnam Pranaya Sakhi**; B. Ajaneesh Loknath – Max; J. Anoop Seelin – Kaalapatthar; Charan Raj – Bheema; V. Harikrishna – Karataka Damanaka; Veer Samarth – Ondu Sarala Prema Kathe	**V. Nagendra Prasad – "Dwapara" from Krishnam Pranaya Sakhi**; Ghouse Peer – "Bhuvana Hudukadide" from Kerebete; Kaviraj – "Ninna Hegalu" from Krishnam Pranaya Sakhi; Nagarjun Sharma – "Dont Worry Baby Chinnamma" from Bheema; Pramod Maravanthe – "Sakhi" from Blink
Best Playback Singer – Male	Best Playback Singer – Female
**Jaskaran Singh – "Dwapara" from Krishnam Pranaya Sakhi**; Kapil Kapilan – "Oh Anahitha" from Ibbani Tabbida Ileyali; Siddhartha Belmannu – "Sakhi" from Blink; Sonu Nigam – "He Gagana" from Krishnam Pranaya Sakhi; Vijay Prakash – "Sanje Mele" from Matinee	**Shruti Prahlad – "Hithalakka Karibyada" from Karataka Damanaka**; Indu Nagaraj – "Chinnamma" from Krishnam Pranaya Sakhi; Shivani Swamy – "Ella Maathannu Onde Baari" from Ondu Sarala Prema Kathe; Srilakshmi Belmannu – "Radhe" from Ibbani Tabbida Ileyali; Vaish – "I Love You" from Bheema
Critics Best Actor	Critics Best Actress
**Gowrishankar SRG – Kerebete as Naga**	**Ankita Amar – Ibbani Tabbida Ileyali as Anahita Madhumita Banarjee**

==== Malayalam cinema ====
Best Film	Best Director
**Manjummel Boys** **– Soubin Shahir, Babu Shahir and Shawn Antony, producers**; Bramayugam – Chakravarthy Ramachandra, S. Sasikanth and Victor Prabhakaran, producers; Aadujeevitham – Blessy, K. G. Abraham and K. C. Eapen, producers; Aattam – Ajith Joy, producer; Premalu – Fahadh Faasil, Dileesh Pothan and Syam Pushkaran, producers; Aavesham – Fahadh Faasil, Nazriya Nazim and Anwar Rasheed, producers; Kishkindha Kaandam – Joby George, producer; Prabhayay Ninachathellam – Thomas Hakim and Julian Graff, producers; Ullozhukku – Ronnie Screwvala, Honey Trehan and Abhishek Chaubey, producers	**Rahul Sadasivan – Bramayugam**; Jithu Madhavan – Aavesham; Jithin Laal – ARM; Chidambaram – Manjummel Boys; Dinjith Ayyathan – Kishkindha Kaandam; Blessy – Aadujeevitham; Anand Ekarshi – Aattam; Christo Tomy – Ullozhukku; Payal Kapadia – Prabhayay Ninachathellam
Best Actor	Best Actress
**Mammootty – Bramayugam as Koduman Potti / Chathan**; Asif Ali – Kishkindha Kaandam as Ajay Chandran; Basil Joseph – Sookshmadarshini as Manuel; Fahadh Faasil – Aavesham as Ranjith Gangadharan / Ranga; Prithviraj Sukumaran – Aadujeevitham as Najeeb Muhammad; Tovino Thomas – ARM as Maniyan / Ajayan / Kunjikelu	**Urvashi – Ullozhukku as Leelamma**; Mamitha Baiju – Premalu as Reenu Roy; Nazriya Nazim – Sookshmadarshini as Priyadarshini Antony; Divya Prabha – Prabhayay Ninachathellam as Anu; Kani Kusruti – Prabhayay Ninachathellam as Prabha; Parvathy Thiruvothu – Ullozhukku as Anju; Zarin Shihab – Aattam as Anjali
Best Supporting Actor	Best Supporting Actress
**Vijayaraghavan – Kishkindha Kaandam as K. Appu Pillai**; Arjun Ashokan – Bramayugam as Thevan / Chathan; Kunchacko Boban – Bougainvillea as Dr. Royce John; Sidharth Bharathan – Bramayugam as Potti's illicit son and cook; K R Gokul – Aadujeevitham as Hakim; Jagadish – Vaazha: Biopic of a Billion Boys as Vishwam's father	**Lijomol Jose – Her as Abhinaya**; Abhinaya – Pani as Gowri; Aparna Balamurali – Kishkindha Kaandam as Aparna; Pooja Mohanraj – Aavesham as Beauty; Surabhi Lakshmi – ARM as Manikyam; Vani Viswanath – Rifle Club as Ittiyanam
Best Music Director	Best Lyricist
**Sushin Shyam – Aavesham**; Amrith Ramnath – Varshangalkku Shesham; A. R. Rahman – Aadujeevitham; Christo Xavier – Sookshmadarshini; Dhibu Ninan Thomas – ARM; Sankar Sharma – Jai Ganesh; Sushin Shyam – Bougainvillea	**Rafeeq Ahamed – "Periyone" from Aadujeevitham**; Manu Manjith – "Angu Vaana Konilu" from ARM; P. S. Rafeeque – "Madhabhara" from Malaikottai Vaaliban; Santhosh Varma – "Orupaadu Paaduvan" from Jai Ganesh; Vaishak Sugunan – "Jeevithagaadhakale" from Varshangalkku Shesham; Vinayak Sasikumar – "Gandharva Ganam" from Rifle Club; Vineeth Sreenivasan – "Madhu Pakaroo" from Varshangalkku Shesham
Best Playback Singer – Male	Best Playback Singer – Female
**Jithin Raj – "Periyone" from Aadujeevitham**; Amrith Ramnath – "Nyabagam" from Varshangalkku Shesham; K. S. Harisankar – "Kiliye" from ARM; Madhu Balakrishnan – "Orupaadu Paaduvan" from Jai Ganesh; Vijay Yesudas – "Omane" from Aadujeevitham; Vineeth Sreenivasan – "Madhu Pakaroo" from Varshangalkku Shesham	**Vaikom Vijayalakshmi – "Angu Vanna Konile" from ARM**; Madhuvanthi Narayanan – "Maravikale" from Bougainvillea; Mary Anna – "Sthuthi" from Bougainvillea; Mridula Warrier – "Mandhara Malarin" from Anand Sreebala; Nithya Mammen – "Ee Vazhikalil" from Kummattikkali; Preeti Pillai – "Mathabhara" from Malaikottai Vaaliban; Shweta Mohan – "Gandharva" from Rifle Club; Sithara Krishnakumar – "Pande Nenchil" from Once Upon a Time in Kochi
Critics Best Actor	Critics Best Actress
**Asif Ali – Kishkindha Kaandam as Ajay Chandran**; **Prithviraj Sukumaran – Aadujeevitham as Najeeb Muhammad**	**Zarin Shihab – Aattam as Anjali**

==== Tamil cinema ====
Best Film	Best Director
**Amaran – Kamal Haasan, R. Mahendran and Vivek Krishnani, producers**; Kottukkaali – Sivakarthikeyan and Kalai Arasu, producers; Lubber Pandhu – S. Lakshman Kumar and A. Venkatesh, producers; Maharaja – Jagadish Palaniswamy and Sudhan Sundaram, producers; Meiyazhagan – Suriya and Jyothika, producers; Vaazhai – Mari Selvaraj and Divya Mari Selvaraj, producers	**PS Vinothraj – Kottukkaali**; **Rajkumar Periasamy – Amaran**; C. Prem Kumar – Meiyazhagan; Mari Selvaraj – Vaazhai; Nithilan Saminathan – Maharaja; Pa. Ranjith – Thangalaan
Best Actor	Best Actress
**Sivakarthikeyan – Amaran as Major Mukund Varadarajan**; Arvind Swamy – Meiyazhagan as Arulmozhi; V R Dinesh – Lubber Pandhu as Poomalai / Gethu; Vikram – Thangalaan as Thangalaan Muni / Kaadaiyan / Arasan "Aaran" / Adhi Muni / Naga Muni; Dhanush – Captain Miller as Analeesan "Easa" / Captain Miller; Soori – Garudan as Sokkan; Vijay Sethupathi – Maharaja as Maharaja	**Sai Pallavi – Amaran as Indu Rebecca Varghese**; Anna Ben – Kottukkaali as Meena; Keerthy Suresh – Raghu Thatha as Kayalvizhi Pandian; Simran – Andhagan as Simi; Sri Gouri Priya – Lover as Divya Shanmugam; Urvashi – J Baby as J Baby
Best Supporting Actor	Best Supporting Actress
**Karthi – Meiyazhagan as Meiyazhagan**; Anurag Kashyap – Maharaja as Selvam; Bobby Deol – Kanguva as Udhiran; Kaali Venkat – Lubber Pandhu as Karuppaiya; Shantanu Bhagyaraj – Blue Star as Rajesh	**Parvathy Thiruvothu – Thangalaan as Gengammal**; **Swasika – Lubber Pandhu as Yasodhai**; Dushara Vijayan – Raayan as Durga; Nikhila Vimal – Vaazhai as Poongodi; Priya Anand – Andhagan as Julie
Best Music Director	Best Lyricist
**G. V. Prakash Kumar – Amaran**; A. R. Rahman – Raayan; Anirudh Ravichander – Vettaiyan; Santhosh Narayanan – Vaazhai; Sean Roldan – Lubber Pandhu	**Uma Devi K – "Yaaro Ivan Yaaro" from Meiyazhagan**; Karthik Netha – "Hey Minnale" from Amaran; Mohan Rajan – "Aasa Orave" from Lubber Pandhu; Vivek – "Uyirey" from Amaran
Best Playback Singer – Male	Best Playback Singer – Female
**Haricharan – "Hey Minnale" from Amaran**; Kapil Kapilan – "Vennilavu Saaral" from Amaran; Pradeep Kumar – "Chillanjirukkiye" from Lubber Pandhu; Sanjay Subrahmanyan – "Manasula" from Viduthalai 2; Sid Sriram – "Thaaye Thaaye" from Maharaja; Vijay Narain – "Poraen Naa Poraen" from Meiyazhagan	**Shweta Mohan – "Hey Minnale" from Amaran**; Ananya Bhat – "Manasula" from Viduthalai 2; Dhee – "Thenkizhakku" from Vaazhai; Ganavya – "Oh Raaya" from Raayan; Sakthisree Gopalan – "Thaensudare" from Lover
Critics Best Actor	Critics Best Actress
**Arvind Swamy – Meiyazhagan as Arulmozhi Varman**	**Anna Ben – Kottukkaali as Meena**

==== Telugu cinema ====
Best Film	Best Director
**Pushpa 2: The Rule – Naveen Yerneni and Y. Ravi Shankar, producers**; 35 Chinna Katha Kaadu – Srujan Yarabolu and Siddharth Rallapalli, producers; Committee Kurrollu – Padmaja Konidela and Jayalakshmi Adapaka; Hanu-Man – K. Niranjan Reddy, producer; Kalki 2898 AD – C. Aswini Dutt, producer; Lucky Baskhar – Suryadevara Naga Vamsi and Sai Soujanya, producers	**Sukumar** **– Pushpa 2: The Rule**; Nag Ashwin – Kalki 2898 AD; Nanda Kishore Emani – 35 Chinna Katha Kaadu; Prasanth Varma – Hanu-Man; Venky Atluri – Lucky Baskhar; Yadhu Vamsi – Committee Kurrollu
Best Actor	Best Actress
**Allu Arjun – Pushpa 2: The Rule as Pushpa Raj**; Dulquer Salmaan – Lucky Baskhar as Baskhar Kumar; N. T. Rama Rao Jr. – Devara: Part 1 as Devara / Vara; Nani – Saripodhaa Sanivaaram as Surya; Siddhu Jonnalagadda – Tillu Square as Bala Gangadhar Tilak; Teja Sajja – Hanu-Man as Hanumanthu	**Nivetha Thomas – 35 Chinna Katha Kaadu as Bala Saraswati**; Anupama Parameswaran – Tillu Square as Lilly Joseph; Ashika Ranganath – Naa Saami Ranga as Varalakshmi; Meenakshi Chaudhary – Lucky Baskhar as Sumathi; Priyanka Mohan – Saripodhaa Sanivaaram as Charulatha; Rashmika Mandanna – Pushpa 2: The Rule as Srivalli
Best Supporting Actor	Best Supporting Actress
**Amitabh Bachchan – Kalki 2898 AD as Ashwatthama**; Dhananjaya – Zebra as Aditya Devaraj; Fahadh Faasil – Pushpa 2: The Rule as Bhanwar Singh Shekhawat; Satya – Mathu Vadalara 2 as Yesu Das; S. J. Surya – Saripodhaa Sanivaaram as R. Dayanand; Vinay Rai – Hanu-Man as Michael / Mega Man	**Anjali – Gangs of Godavari as Rathnamala**; Faria Abdullah – Mathu Vadalara 2 as Nidhi; Rashi Singh – Prasanna Vadanam as Vaidehi; Sharanya Pradeep – Ambajipeta Marriage Band as Padma; Shraddha Srinath – Mechanic Rocky as Apsara / Maya; Varalaxmi Sarathkumar – Hanu-Man as Anjamma
Best Music Director	Best Lyricist
**Devi Sri Prasad – Pushpa 2: The Rule**; Anirudh Ravichander – Devara: Part 1; Chaitan Bharadwaj – Harom Hara; G. V. Prakash Kumar – Lucky Baskhar; Gowra Hari, Anudeep Dev, Krishna Saurabh – Hanu-Man; Jakes Bejoy – Saripodhaa Sanivaaram; Thaman S – Guntur Kaaram	**Ramajogayya Sastry – "Chuttamalle" from Devara: Part 1**; Krishna Kanth – "Aa Rojulu Malli Raavu" from Committee Kurrollu; Ramajogayya Sastry – "Dum Masala" from Guntur Kaaram; Ramajogayya Sastry – "Kurchi Madathapetti" from Guntur Kaaram; Sri Mani – "Srimathi Garu" from Lucky Baskhar
Best Playback Singer – Male	Best Playback Singer – Female
**Sri Krishna – "Kurchi Madathapetti" from Guntur Kaaram**; Anirudh Ravichander – "The Fear Song" from Devara: Part 1; Anurag Kulkarni – "Suttamla Soosi" from Gangs of Godavari; Arijit Singh – "Anuvanuvu" from Om Bheem Bush; Gowra Hari – "Poolamme Pilla" from Hanu-Man; Ram Miriyala – "Sufiyana" from Aay; Sanjith Hegde – "Dum Masala" from Guntur Kaaram	**Shilpa Rao – "Chuttamalle" from Devara: Part 1**; Mangli – "Gulledu Gulledu" from Mechanic Rocky; Shreya Ghoshal – "Sooseki" from Pushpa 2: The Rule; Usha Uthup – "Title Track" from Lucky Baskhar
Critics Best Actor	Critics Best Actress
**Teja Sajja – Hanu-Man as Hanumanthu**	**Kajal Aggarwal – Satyabhama as Satyabhama IPS**

=== Technical awards ===
Best Cinematographer
- **CH Sai (Tamil) – Amaran**
- **Sunil K. S. (Malayalam) – Aadujeevitham**
Best Choreographer
- **Sekhar (Telugu) – "Kurchi Madathapetti" from Guntur Kaaram**
Best Production Design
- **Nitin Zihani Choudhary (Telugu) – Kalki 2898 AD**
- **Ramakrishna & Monica (Telugu) – Pushpa 2: The Rule**

=== Special awards ===
Lifetime Achievement Award
- **Sreenivasan** (Note: Awarded posthumously)
- **Sreekumaran Thampi**
Critics Best Film (Director)
- **Lucky Baskhar** **(Telugu) – Venky Atluri**
- **Meiyazhagan** **(Tamil) – C. Prem Kumar**
- **Ullozhukku (Malayalam) – Christo Tomy**
- **Kishkindha Kaandam** **(Malayalam) – Dinjith Ayyathan**
- **Blink (Kannada) – Srinidhi Bengaluru**
Best Debut Director
- **Yadhu Vamsi (Telugu) – Committee Kurrollu**
- **Suresh Mari (Tamil) – J Baby**
- **Tamizharasan Pachamuthu (Tamil) – Lubber Pandhu**
- **Jithin Laal (Malayalam) – ARM**
- **Joju George** **(Malayalam) – Pani**
Best Male Debut
- **Sandeep Saroj (Telugu) – Committee Kurrollu as Shiva**
- **Hridhu Haroon (Tamil) – Thugs as Sethu Padmakumar**
- **Abhimanyu Shammy Thilakan** **(Malayalam) – Marco as Russell Isaac**
- **K. R. Gokul** **(Malayalam) – Aadujeevitham as Hakim**
- **Samarjit Lankesh** **(Kannada) – Gowri as Raja / Gowri**
Best Female Debut
- **Nayan Sarika (Telugu) – Aay as "Funk" Pallavi**
- **Sri Gouri Priya (Tamil) – Lover as Divya Shanmugam**
- **Methil Devika** **(Malayalam) – Kadha Innuvare as M. S. Lekshmi**
- **Bindu Shivaram (Kannada) – Kerebete as Meena**
Outstanding Performance
- **Vikram (Tamil) – Thangalaan as Thangalaan Muni / Kaadaiyan / Arasan "Aaran" / Adhi Muni / Naga Muni**
Breakthrough In Filmmaking
- **Anand Ekarshi** **(Malayalam)** **– Aattam**
Cine Icon Award
- **Bhavana**

== Superlatives ==
Films with multiple nominations
Nominations	Film
10	Amaran
8	Aadujeevitham
8	Krishnam Pranaya Sakhi
7	ARM
7	Bheema
7	Hanu-Man
7	Lucky Baskhar
7	Lubber Pandhu
7	Pushpa 2: The Rule
6	Blink
6	Meiyazhagan
5	Aavesham
5	Bramayugam
5	Guntur Kaaram
5	Kishkindha Kaandam
5	Maharaja
5	Varshangalkku Shesham
5	Vaazhai
4	Bagheera
4	Bougainvillea
4	Kerebete
4	Prabhayay Ninachathellam
4	Saripodhaa Sanivaaram
4	Shakhahaari
4	Ullozhukku
3	35 Chinna Katha Kaadu
3	Aattam
3	Committee Kurrollu
3	Hadinelentu
3	Ibbani Tabbida Ileyali
3	Kalki 2898 AD
3	Kottukkaali
3	Photo
3	Rifle Club
3	Sookshmadarshini
3	Thangalaan
2	Andhagan
2	Gangs of Godavari
2	Jai Ganesh
2	Karataka Damanaka
2	Lover
2	Malaikottai Vaaliban
2	Manjummel Boys
2	Maryade Prashne
2	Mathu Vadalara 2
2	Mechanic Rocky
2	Ondu Sarala Prema Kathe
2	Premalu
2	Raayan
2	Roopanthara
2	Viduthalai 2

Films with multiple awards (including non-competitive)
Awards	Film
8	Amaran
5	Aadujeevitham
5	Pushpa 2: The Rule
4	Meiyazhagan
3	Kishkindha Kaandam
3	Krishnam Pranaya Sakhi
2	Aattam
2	ARM
2	Blink
2	Bramayugam
2	Committee Kurrollu
2	Devara: Part 1
2	Guntur Kaaram
2	Kalki 2898 AD
2	Kerebete
2	Kottukkaali
2	Lubber Pandhu
2	Thangalaan
2	Ullozhukku

== Presenters and performers ==
Performers
Performer	Work
Aparna Balamurali	Dance
Nidhhi Agerwal	Dance
Pranitha Subhash	Dance
Sanya Malhotra	Dance
Trisha Shetty	Dance
