= Filmfare Award for Best Female Playback Singer – Malayalam =

Indian annual film award

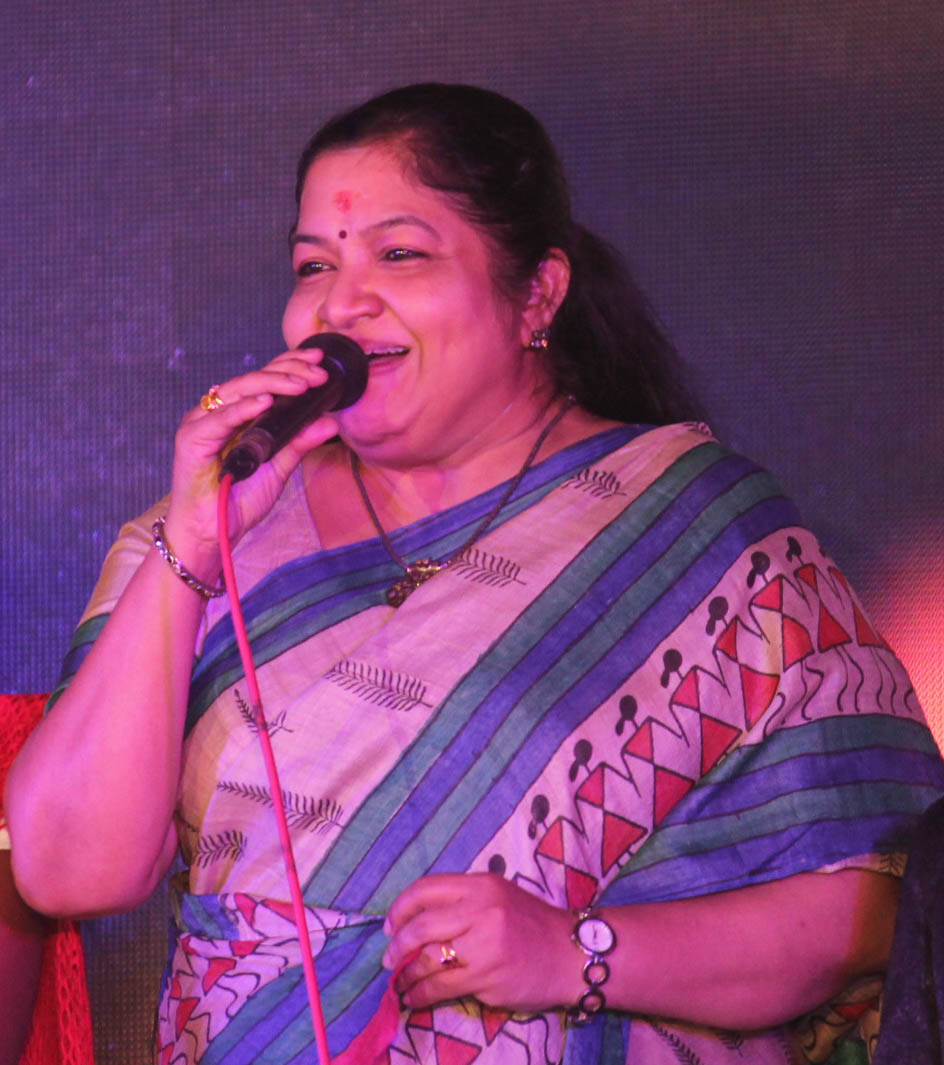
K. S. Chithra holds a record as 6 time winner in Playback singing female category from 9 nominations & also winning for two consecutive times, i.e., in 2009 & 2010

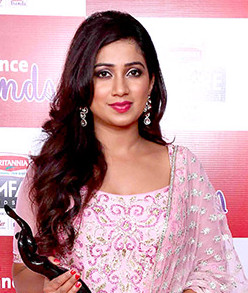
Shreya Ghoshal holds the highest number of nominations (13) and most consecutive nominations (10) from 2010 to 2016, resulting in 4 wins

The Filmfare Best Female Playback Award is given by the Filmfare magazine as part of its annual Filmfare Awards South for Malayalam films. The first Malayalam award was given in 2007. Before that, from 1997 till 2005, a common award for playback was available for both male and female singers of all the four South Indian languages.

== Superlatives ==
Superlative	Singer	Record
Most awards	K. S. Chithra	6
Most Nominations	Shreya Ghoshal	14
Most consecutive wins	Shreya Ghoshal	2 (2011-2012), (2015-2016)
Most consecutive wins	K. S. Chithra	2 (2009-2010)
Most consecutive nominations	Shreya Ghoshal	10 (2010-2016)

== Winners ==
The following is a list of the award winners and the film and song for which they won.

Year	Singer	Film	Song	Ref
2024	Vaikom Vijayalakshmi	ARM	"Angu Vaana"	
2023	K. S. Chithra	Jawanum Mullapoovum	"Muthathe Mulla"	
2022	Mridula Warrier	Pathonpatham Noottandu	"Mayilpeeli Ilakunnu"	
2020–2021	K. S. Chithra	Malik	"Theerame"	
2019	AWARDS FUNCTION WAS SUSPENDED DUE TO COVID-19 PANDEMIC			
2018	Anne Amie	Koode	"Aararo"	
2017	K. S. Chithra	Kamboji	"Nadavathil"	
2016	Chinmayi	Action Hero Biju	"Oonjalil Aadi"	
2015	Shreya Ghoshal	Ennu Ninte Moideen	"Kaathirunnu"	
2014	Shreya Ghoshal	How Old Are You?	"Vijanathayil"	
2013	Vaikom Vijayalakshmi	Nadan	"Ottakku Padunna"	
2012	Shweta Mohan	Arike	"Shyama Hare"	
2011	Shreya Ghoshal	Pranayam	"Paattil Ee Paattil"	
2010	Shreya Ghoshal	Anwar	"Kizhakku Pookkum"	
2009	K. S. Chithra	Pazhassi Raja	"Kunnathe Konna"	
2008	K. S. Chithra	Thirakkatha	"Oduvil Oru"	
2007	Shweta Mohan	Ore Kadal	"Yamuna Veruthe"	
2006	K. S. Chithra	Vadakkumnadhan	"Kalabham Tharam"	

== Nominations ==
The nominees were announced publicly only from 2009. The list along with winners:

=== 2000s ===
2008: K. S. Chithra – "Oduvil Oru" – Thirakkatha

- Aparna Rajeev – "Manju Thara" – Mizhikal Sakshi
- Gayatri – "Kannin Vathil" – Mulla
- Manjari – "Kadaloram Vatsa" – Minnaminnikoottam
- Rimy Tomy – "Aarumugham" – Mulla

=== 2010s ===
2009: K. S. Chithra – "Kunnathe Konna" – Pazhassi Raja

- Shreya Ghoshal – "Chanthu Thottille" – Banaras
- Shweta Mohan – "Thottal Pookkum" – Moz & Cat
- Shweta Mohan – "Priyanu Mathram" – Robin Hood
- Sujatha Mohan – "Muthe Muthe" – Kana Kanmani

2010: Shreya Ghoshal – "Kizhakku Pookkum" – Anwar

- K. S. Chithra – "Malakha Pole" – Mummy & Me
- Shreya Ghoshal – "Manju Mazhakkattil" – Aagathan
- Shweta Mohan – "Maavin Chuvatile" – Oru Naal Varum
- Sujatha Mohan – "Pachila Charthan" – Karayilekku Oru Kadal Dooram

2011: Shreya Ghoshal – "Paattil Ee Paattil" – Pranayam

- Gayatri – "Ninviral Thumbil" – Beautiful
- Jyotsna – "Chantham Thikanjoru" – Mohabbath
- Manjari – "Chimmi Chimmi" – Urumi
- Shreya Ghoshal – "Kaanamullal" – Salt N' Pepper

2012: Shweta Mohan – "Shyama Hare" – Arike

- K. S. Chithra – "Vishukkani Poothu" – Ivan Megharoopan
- Mamta Mohandas – "Iravil Viriyum" – Arike
- Remya Nambeesan – "Andelonde" – Ivan Megharoopan
- Shreya Ghoshal – "Nilave Nilave" – Chattakaari

2013: Vaikom Vijayalakshmi – "Ottakku Padunna" – Nadan

- Anuradha Sriram – "Vadakkini Poomughathu" – Ayal Njanalla
- Mridula Warrier – "Laalee Laalee" – Kalimannu
- Shreya Ghoshal – "Shalabhamayi" – Kalimannu
- Sithara – "Ennundodee" – Celluloid

2014: Shreya Ghoshal – "Vijanathayil" – How Old Are You?

- B. Arundhathi – "Maara Sannibho" – Swapaanam
- Shweta Mohan – "Onaam Kombath" – Ottamandaram
- Sujatha Mohan – "Elampoo Vazhi" – Ottamandaram
- Vani Jayaram – "Olenjil Kuruvi" – 1983

2015: Shreya Ghoshal – "Kaathirunnu" – Ennu Ninte Moideen

- Chitra Arun – "Oru Makara Nilavayi" – Rani Padmi
- Shreya Ghoshal – "Mele Mele" – Life of Josutty
- Shweta Mohan – "Kayampoo Niramayi" – Su Su Sudhi Vathmeekam
- Vaikom Vijayalakshmi – "Kaikkottum" – Oru Vadakkan Selfie

2016: Chinmayi – "Oonjalil Aadi" – Action Hero Biju

- Divya S. Menon – "Varthinkale" – Kali
- Rinu Razak – "Raavu Mayave" – Vettah
- Shweta Mohan – "Oruvela" – White
- Varsha Vinu – "Melle Vannupoyi" – Marupadi

2017: K. S. Chithra – "Nadavathil Thurannilla" – Kambhoji

- Gayathri Varma – "Kasavu Njorium" – Udaharanam Sujatha
- Shreya Ghoshal – "Akale Oru Kaadinte" – Ramante Edanthottam
- Shweta Mohan – "Orupuzhayarikil" – Munthiri Vallikal Thalirkkumbol
- Sithara Krishnakumar – "Vanamakalunnu" – Vimaanam

2018: Anne Amie – "Aararo" – Koode

- Megha Josekutty – "Endhe Kanna" – Aravindante Athidhikal
- Neha Nair – "Ponnumkasavitta" – Queen
- Shreya Ghoshal – "Palthira" – Captain
- Shreya Ghoshal – "Maanam Thudukkanu" – Odiyan

=== 2020s ===
2020–2021: K. S. Chithra – "Theerame" – Malik

- Jyotsna Radhakrishnan – "Ithal Ithalayi" – Kshanam
- Mridula Warrier – "Enthinen Pranayame" – Bhoomiyile Manohara Swakaryam
- Neha Nair – "Pakaliravugalal" – Kurup
- Nithya Mammen – "Vaathikkalu Vellarippravu" – Sufiyum Sujatayum
- Sithara Krishnakumar – "Kadukumanikkoru" – Kappela
- Sujatha Mohan – "Neelambale" – The Priest
- Swetha Mohan – "Muthunne Kannugalil" – Varane Avashyamund

2022: Mridula Warrier – "Mayilpeeli Ilakunnu" – Pathonpatham Noottandu

- Aavani Malhar – "Mandarappoove" – Kumari
- Anne Amie – "Pranayamennoru Vakku" - Meri Awas Suno
- Shweta Mohan – "Mannum Niranje" - Malayankunju
- Sithara Krishnakumar – "Angane" - Jack N' Jill
- Vrinda Menon – "Elelamma" - Signature

2023: K. S. Chithra – "Muttathe Mulla" – Jawanum Mullapoovum

- K. S. Chithra – "Aga Naga" – Jaladhara Pumpset Since 1962
- Karthika Vaidyanathan – "Neeyum Njaanum" – Pazhanjan Pranayam
- Madhuvanthi Narayan – "Chembarathi Poo" – Janaki Jaane
- Nakshathra Santhosh – "Vidaathe Vichaaram" – Phoenix
- Nithya Mammen – "Mizhiyo Niraye" – Dear Vaappi
- Shreya Ghoshal – "Ayisha Ayisha" – Ayisha

2024: Vaikom Vijayalakshmi – "Angu Vanna Konile" – ARM

- Madhuvanthi Narayanan – "Maravikale" – Bougainvillea
- Mary Anna – "Sthuthi" – Bougainvillea
- Mridula Warrier – "Mandhara Malarin" – Anand Sribala
- Nithya Mammen – "Ee Vazhikalil" – Kummattikkali
- Preeti Pillai – "Mathabhara" – Malaikottai Vaaliban
- Shweta Mohan – "Gandharva" – Rifle Club
- Sithara Krishnakumar – "Pande Nenchil" – Once Upon a Time in Kochi

== See also ==
- List of music awards honoring women
