= Filmfare Critics Award for Best Film – Kannada =

The Filmfare Critics Award for Best Film – Kannada is given by the Filmfare magazine as part of its annual Filmfare Awards South for South Indian films. It acknowledges an encourages the filmmakers of the direction department. The award for Kannada films in this category was first given in 2022.

== Winners ==
Year	Film	Director	Refs
2022	Dharani Mandala Madhyadolage	Sridhar Shikaripura	
2023	Pinki Elli	Prithvi Konanur	
2024	Blink	Srinidhi Bengaluru	
