= Filmfare Award for Best Debut Director – South =

Annual award for South Indian films

The Filmfare Award for Best Debut Director is given by the Filmfare magazine as part of its annual Filmfare Awards for films made in Telugu, Tamil, Malayalam and Kannada.

The award was first given in 2023.

== Winners ==
Year	Director	Film	Language	Ref.
2023	Srikanth Odela	Dasara	Telugu	
2023	Shouryav	Hi Nanna	Telugu	
2024	Yadhu Vamsi	Committee Kurrollu	Telugu	
2024	Suresh Mari	J Baby	Tamil	
2024	Tamizharasan Pachamuthu	Lubber Pandhu	Tamil	
2024	Jithin Laal	ARM	Malayalam	
2024	Joju George	Pani	Malayalam	
