= Shakhahaari =

- Theatrical release poster
- Directed by: Sandeep Sunkad
- Written by: Sandeep Sunkad
- Story by: S. R. Girish; Sandeep Sunkad
- Produced by: Rajesh Keelambi; Ranjini Prasanna
- Starring: Rangayana Raghu; Gopalkrishna Deshpande; Vinay UJ; Nidhi Hegde
- Cinematography: Vishwajith Rao
- Edited by: Shashank Narayana
- Music by: Mayur Ambekallu
- Production company: Keelambi Media Lab
- Distributed by: KRG Studios
- Release date: 16 February 2024
- Running time: 146 minutes
- Country: India
- Language: Kannada

Shakhahaari (transl. Vegetarian) is a 2024 Indian Kannada-language murder mystery film written and directed by debutant Sandeep Sunkad. The film features Rangayana Raghu, Gopalkrishna Deshpande, Vinay UJ and Nidhi Hegde in the lead roles. The film's score and soundtrack is composed by Mayur Ambekallu while Vishwajith Rao handled the cinematography and editing by Shashank Narayana. The film was shot extensively in Malenadu capturing the picturesque landscapes.

The film was released on 16 February 2024. The film opened to positive reviews from critics and audience. At the 70th Filmfare Awards South, the film won under Best Film category.

== Plot ==
Mastikatte Subramanya "Subbanna" Bhat is a middle-aged, soft-spoken chef who operates a small vegetarian restaurant in a rural village—a family-run establishment passed down through three generations. Having remained unmarried following a separation from his girlfriend Subhadra, Subbanna continues to observe her daily as she passes by on a bus route behind the restaurant and exchanges glances with him. One day, an injured fugitive named Vijay—who has escaped police custody and sustained gunshot wounds during an encounter with a unit led by Sub-Inspector Mallikarjuna Hiremath—collapses inside Subbanna's restaurant. Although initially hesitant, Subbanna chooses to conceal Vijay's presence when questioned by the authorities and provides him shelter in his bedroom located at the rear of the establishment. While caring for his injuries, Subbanna learns about Vijay's background and circumstances.

Vijay, who was raised in an orphanage, formed a close bond with a fellow orphan named Harsha, whom he came to regard as family. The two remained inseparable into adulthood. Vijay later secured employment with the Border Security Force. Seeking to provide Vijay with familial stability, Harsha arranged his marriage to a local woman named Saugandhika. The couple developed a mutual affection, though Vijay's subsequent departure for a two-year military training program broke her. During his absence, Saugandhika entered into an extramarital relationship with a neighbour, Madan—a fact Vijay discovered through a letter from Harsha. Upon confronting her, Saugandhika admitted to the affair but insisted that she still loved Vijay. That night, drunk, Vijay returned home and allegedly witnessed Madan strangling Saugandhika in their room before losing consciousness. The following morning, Vijay was arrested by the police for her murder. With the police prepared to close the case based on the initial evidence, Vijay attempted to escape custody in order to establish his innocence.

Compelled by Vijay's assertions of innocence, Subbanna chooses to shelter and care for him. He even assists in planning Vijay's escape to another village. However, before their plan can be carried out, Vijay dies under unclear circumstances. In an effort to avoid suspicion or criminal charges, Subbanna discreetly disposes of Vijay's body and thoroughly cleans the restaurant premises to eliminate any trace of the incident, by mutilating the body into small parts and throwing them into the kitchen's pyre along with other stock wood. Soon after, a regular customer begins to complain about a persistent unpleasant odour in the establishment, irritating Subbanna. Meanwhile, another patron—Shastry, a nosy and inquisitive local—grows suspicious of Subbanna's behaviour and decides to investigate the matter further, partly driven by personal amusement.

As the investigation progresses, Mallikarjuna begins to suspect Vijay's innocence, informed both by his findings and conversations with Harsha. Considering a successful case closure would expedite his transfer to his hometown—where his ailing wife is recovering—Mallikarjuna continues to pursue the identity of the real killer. His inquiries eventually lead him to Madan, whose whereabouts he begins to trace. Meanwhile, Subbanna receives a letter from Subhadra, who informs him that her marriage has ended poorly and expresses interest in rekindling their relationship, which brings Subbanna a sense of renewed happiness. Shastry—already suspicious—takes note of Subbanna's sudden change in demeanor and following a confrontation in which Subbanna reacts strongly to Shastry's probing, he becomes further convinced that something is wrong. Mallikarjuna, after hearing from Shastry and other locals about the unusual odour in the restaurant and Subbanna's increasingly erratic behaviour, uncovers that Madan is in fact Subbanna's stepbrother. This revelation leads him to confront Subbanna directly.

Subbanna discloses the full truth regarding Madan, a criminal with whom he has long been estranged. On one occasion, a drunken Madan forcibly entered Subbanna's restaurant after hours demanding money. During this confrontation, Subbanna discovers a collection of photographs in Madan's possession, which include images of Vijay and Saugandhika. These photos reveal that Madan has been involved in multiple extramarital affairs, using the threat of exposure to extort money from those involved. Saugandhika was Madan's most recent victim; lacking financial resources, she was killed by Madan, who then sought to implicate Vijay in the murder. When Subbanna attempted to prevent Madan from stealing money and forcibly removed him from the premises, he found Madan dead, leading to a state of panic. Subsequently, Subbanna disposed of Madan's body in the same manner as Vijay's. This revelation explains Subbanna's decision to protect Vijay from the police, as he recognized him from the photographs and felt a sense of responsibility for the crimes committed by his stepbrother.

Shocked by Subbanna's confession, Mallikarjuna demands that he surrender to the police, presenting a recording of their conversation as evidence. However, upon discovering that the recorder was without battery and no conversation was captured, Subbanna mocks Mallikarjuna. In response, Mallikarjuna strikes Subbanna, inadvertently causing a fatal injury when a nail pierces Subbanna's temple. Aware that Head Constable Mamtha Kini—one of his subordinates who is aware Subbanna was last seen by him—is in collusion with a lawyer who has had previous disputes with Mallikarjuna, he opts to dispose of Subbanna's body in the same manner as those of Madan and Vijay. After completing this, Mallikarjuna dies from ingesting a drink laced with rat poison, which Subbanna had given him before his death. The investigation remains open, with the restaurant sealed off as a crime scene. Subhadra, entering the restaurant through the back door one morning, discovers her letter partially burnt on the stove and is left devastated.

== Cast ==
- Rangayana Raghu as Mastikatte Subramanya "Subbanna" Bhat
- Gopalkrishna Deshpande as SI Mallikarjuna Hiremath
- Raj Ninasam as Madan
- Sujay Shastry as Shastry
- Harini Srikanth as Subhadra
- Vinay Uj as Vijay
- Nidhi Hegde as Saugandhika
- Prathima Nayak as Headconstable Mamtha Kini
- Shreesharsha Gobhatt as Harsha
- Prashanth Natana as Senior Inspector

== Production ==
The film explored an entirely new avatar of Rangayana Raghu which sparked curiosity and interest among people.

Before the release of the film, Rangayana Raghu was awarded with the title of "Abhinayaasura" by the team in the presence of Ashwini Puneeth Rajkumar and Duniya Suri for his contribution in the past 35 years.

== Soundtrack ==
Shakhahaari

Soundtrack album by Mayur Ambekallu
- Released: 2024
- Recorded: 2024
- Genre: Feature film soundtrack
- Length: 10:58
- Label: MRT Music
- Producer: Mayur Ambekallu

The soundtrack and background score for the film was composed by Mayur Ambekallu in his debut.

Track listing
No.	Title	Lyrics	Artist(s)	Length
1.	"Sougandhika"	Sandeep Sunkad	Siddhartha Belmannu, Aishwarya Rangarajan	4:50
2.	"Soul of Shakhahaari"	Vishwajith Rao	Chaithra J Achar	3:59
3.	"Agali Iralareno"	Chandrashekhara Kambara	Mayur Ambekallu	2:49
Total length:				10:58

== Release ==
=== Theatrical ===
Shakhahaari was theatrically released in India on 16 February 2024 and received positive reviews from critics as well as audience. The film had competed 50 day run in selected theatres in Bengaluru.

=== Home media ===
The film was available for digital streaming in US and UK on Amazon Prime Video from 22 May 2024. In India it started streaming from 23 May 2024. The film was further dubbed into Telugu and released on Amazon Prime and Aha.

== Reception ==
The film received positive reviews with praise for acting of Rangayana Raghu, Gopalkrishna Deshpande, direction and music.

Harish Basavarajiah of The Times of India rated the film 3.5 out of 5 and described it as "A riveting crime thriller to keep you on the edge of your seat". Pratibha Joy of OTTPlay rated the film 3.5/5 and wrote "Rangayana Raghu and Gopalkrishna Deshpande excel in film that oscillates between thriller and love story" Vivek M.V of The Hindu in his review said "While faltering near the end, director Sandeep Sunkad makes a promising debut with ‘Shakhahaari’, a film that puts two vulnerable characters in the middle of a murder mystery." A Sharadhaa of Cinema Express appreciating the director and wrote "Director Sandeep’s debut film may seem deceptive to those who have watched it, but he has executed the movie with precision, gradually building momentum as the story unfolds." Sujay B M of Deccan Herald in his review said "Despite its flaws, ‘Shakhahaari’ is worth a watch for its creative plot carried effectively on Raghu's able shoulders."
