= Gopalkrishna Deshpande =

Indian actor (born 1983/1984)

- Born: 7 October 1983 or 1984 (age 41–42); Karnataka, India
- Occupation: Actor
- Years active: 2017–present

Gopalkrishna Deshpande (born 7 October 1983/1984) is an Indian actor known for his work in Kannada cinema. After a stint in theatre with Ninasam and in television, he made his film debut in 2017. He is a noted character actor.

Deshpande gained recognition for his role in Raj B. Shetty's gangster film Garuda Gamana Vrishabha Vahana (2021), after which he had many notable supporting roles. The include Sapta Saagaradaache Ello: Side B (2023), Shakhahaari (2024), Blink (2024) and Second Case of Seetharam (2026). His performance in Blink won him the Filmfare Award for Best Supporting Actor – Kannada.

== Early life ==
Gopalkrishna Deshpande was born on 7 October 1983 or 1984. He hails from the town of Hunagunda in the Bagalkot district of Karnataka. His father, Dhruvraj Deshpande, was an alumnus and acting teacher of the theatre troupe Ninasam. He had also founded his own troupe, Durvaranga. Gopalkrishna recalled his household being "fairly artistic" and that the family would discuss about Kannada literature. Although he watched Hindi films while growing up in Bagalkote, he was not drawn towards acting. A few years after his father's death in 2005, he enrolled at Ninasam to study theatre and acting "just out of curiosity." He later dropped out of a bachelor of science program to pursue stage acting seriously.

== Career ==
With Ninasam's wandering troupe, Ninasam Tirugaata, Deshpande travelled while performing in plays for three years. He recalled that he was "bitten by the acting bug, when I saw the audience's reaction to our work on stage." In 2011, he moved to Bangalore to try his hand at television. His made his first screen appearance with the serial, Putta Gowri Maduve, before acting in B. Suresha's Aliguli Mane.

Deshpande's film debut came in 2017 with Saheba. In the gangster film Garuda Gamana Vrishabha Vahana (2021), he played, sub-inspector Brahmayya, a cowardly cop who slowly gathers courage to nab a dangerous gangster. His performance earned him praise; Sunayana Suresh of The Times of India opined that his performance "deserves special mention for his nuanced performance and subtle acting." In the rural drama Kothalavadi (2025), he played a junk-shop owner who goes on to become a vile politician. A. Sharadhaa of the New Indian Express wrote, "The real show-stealer is Gopal Krishna Deshpande. As Gujari Babu, he is all charm and chill menace. He doesn't raise his voice or brandish weapons; instead, he manipulates with pauses and smiles, weaponising belief in the guise of empowerment. It's a performance rooted in restraint, and it anchors much of the film's tension."

== Filmography ==
=== Film ===
Year	Title	Role	Notes	Ref(s)
2011	Lifeu Ishtene	Barber		
2017	Saheba			
2018	Thayige Thakka Maga			
2018	Nathicharami	Ravi		
2019	Lambodara			
2019	Arishadvarga	Bheemsen Joshi		
2019	Mahira	Kashi		
2019	Kannad Gothilla			
2019	Avane Srimannarayana	Bandmaster		
2019	Nalke			
2021	Mangalavara Rajaadina	Madeva		
2021	Garuda Gamana Vrishabha Vahana	Brahmayya	Nominated—SIIMA Award for Best Actor in a Supporting Role (Kannada)	
2022	777 Charlie	Kripakar		
2022	Buddies			
2022	Hope	Shivashankar		
2022	Shubhamangala	Manjunath		
2022	10	Pradeep Gowda		
2023	Gowli			
2023	Toby	Damodhara		
2023	Sapta Saagaradaache Ello: Side A	Prisoner		
2023	Sapta Saagaradaache Ello: Side B	Prakash	Nominated—SIIMA Award for Best Actor in a Supporting Role (Kannada); IIFA Utsavam Award for Performance in a Supporting Role – Male	
2023	Swathi Mutthina Male Haniye			
2023	Marichi	Naga Shetty		
2024	Yathabhava	Hiremath		
2024	Supplier Shankara	Narayana Swamy		
2024	Shakhahaari	Mallikarjuna Hiremath	Nominated—Filmfare Award for Best Supporting Actor – Kannada; Nominated—SIIMA Award for Best Actor in a Supporting Role (Kannada)	
2024	Blink	Gopal Krishna	Filmfare Award for Best Supporting Actor – Kannada	
2024	Kerebete			
2024	Yuva	Principal of college		
2024	Bisi-Bisi Ice-Cream	Mahantesh		
2024	Green			
2024	O2	Nayak		
2024	Not Out	Sridhar		
2024	Happy Birthday to Me	Janardhan		
2024	Hejjaru			
2024	Kenda			
2024	Bheema	Allu		
2024	Powder	Sulaiman		
2024	Bhairathi Ranagal			
2025	Royal			
2025	Bandook			
2025	Kothalavadi	Ramesh "Gujari" Babu		
2025	Bank of Bhagyalakshmi	Kesavaditya		
2025	The Task	Shreelakshmi's Father		
2025	Mark	Rangayya		
2026	Landlord			
2026	Rakkasapuradhol	Teacher		
2026	Second Case of Seetharam	Sebastian		
2026	The Rise of Ashoka			
2026	Neeli Hakki	Maasti		
2026	Graamaayana	Sadananda Swamy		
2026	Bail			

=== Television ===
- Putta Gowri Maduve
