= Thangalaan (soundtrack) =

- Tamil version cover

Soundtrack album by G. V. Prakash Kumar
- Released: 11 August 2024
- Recorded: 2022–2024
- Genre: Feature film soundtrack
- Length: 16:47
- Language: Tamil
- Label: Junglee Music
- Producer: G. V. Prakash Kumar

G. V. Prakash Kumar chronology
Sarfira (2024)	Thangalaan (2024)	Amaran (2024)
External audio
- Audio Jukebox on YouTube

Singles from Thangalaan
- 1. "Minikki Minikki" Released: 17 July 2024; 2. "Thangalaan War Song" Released: 2 August 2024

Thangalaan is the soundtrack album composed by G. V. Prakash Kumar to the 2024 Tamil-language action adventure film of the same name directed by Pa. Ranjith and produced by Studio Green and Neelam Productions, starring Vikram, Parvathy Thiruvothu, Malavika Mohanan, Daniel Caltagirone, Pasupathy and Hari Krishnan. The album featured five songs with lyrics written by Umadevi, Arivu and Mounan Yathrigan. The album, preceded by two singles, released under the Junglee Music label on 11 August 2024 to positive reviews from critics.

== Background ==
In November 2021, it was reported that Anirudh Ravichander would compose music for the film, thereby replacing Ranjith's norm composer Santhosh Narayanan. However, G. V. Prakash Kumar was confirmed as the music composer in June 2022. Thangalaan marked Prakash's maiden collaboration with Ranjith and third with Vikram after Deiva Thirumagal (2011) and Thaandavam (2012).

The film's musical landscape derives heavy influence of Indian folk and tribal music. Since the film is set in the 19th century, Prakash did not use any modern instruments and synthesizers and instead use live instrumentation for recording the score.

== Composition ==
Prakash started composing and recording two songs for the film in January 2023. The following month, he completed recording the third song for the film, which came "extraordinarily well". Lyricists Uma Devi and Arivu were present in the recording sessions, so that they could write the lyrics for the songs when the tune is ready, and the lyrics "are coined very beautifully". Prakash performed few lines of the song at a performance Margazhiyil Makkalisai event hosted by Ranjith's Neelam Cultural Centre, and received rave response from fans, comparing with his work in Aayirathil Oruvan (2010). He started recording the film's background score on 24 April 2024 and completed it on 1 July 2024. It took him nearly fifty days for re-recording the score, with him finalizing the output within 2–3 days.

Prakash stated that unlike any periodic films, where he would utilize classical music of that period, Prakash used tribal sounds for the film, due to its content. In an interaction with Naman Ramachandran of Variety, he added that he wanted to genuinely bring the sound of the tribes. His curiosity on researching tribal music led him to study about Australian and African tribes to implement the approach. The recording process, had him utilizing deep tribal voices, woodwinds and shout calls to give the desired result, as well as having an international touch to it, "like in a soundscape trying to make it theatrical, and yet sound different from my contemporaries."

== Release ==
The audio rights of the film were sold to Junglee Music for ₹5 crore (US$590,000). In mid-June 2024, Prakash took to his X (formerly Twitter) account stating that he had sent the mastered audio of the first single track to the production house and the label, Junglee Music, which approved of it and eventually ready for release. The first single track "Minikki Minikki" was released on 17 July 2024. It was released in four languages, apart from Tamil, including "Manaki Manaki" (Telugu), "Midukki Midukki" (Malayalam), "Nanagu Nanagu" (Kannada) and "Murga Murgi" (Hindi). The song was recorded by Sinduri Vishal, who had sung in her chest voice and was helped by Ranjith and Uma Devi for her dialect and pronunciation. The second single, "Thangalaan War Song" was released in five languages on 2 August. The five-song soundtrack, which included the previously released singles, were released on 11 August.

== Critical reception ==
Avinash Ramachandran of The Indian Express called it as a "thumping" score. Janani K. of India Today wrote "composer GV Prakash Kumar's music and background score do manage to elevate the film to an extent". Balakrishna Ganesan of The News Minute wrote "music composer GV Prakash delivers a fantastic background score, particularly the war theme. After Aayirathil Oruvan, this will be another memorable film in his career." Goutham S of Pinkvilla stated Prakash's music as one of the biggest strengths, adding "[Prakash] incorporated folk-inspired background scores that are deeply rooted in Tamil traditions, adding richness to every scene. The emotional depth created by his music elevates the overall viewing experience significantly." Rajasekar S of The Federal wrote "Thangalaan stands out with the amazing background score and songs by GV Prakash, who has given life."

== Track listing ==
=== Tamil ===
No.	Title	Lyrics	Singer(s)	Length
1.	"Minikki Minikki"	Uma Devi	Sinduri Vishal	3:22
2.	"Thangalaan War Song"	Arivu	G. V. Prakash Kumar, Arivu	2:59
3.	"Aruvadai"	Uma Devi	Vikram, Sinduri Vishal, Mathichiyam Bala, Suganthi	3:27
4.	"Thandora Pottanungo"	Mounan Yathrigan	Gana Juli Kumar	3:03
5.	"Thangalaan Oppari Song"	Arivu	Kidakuzhi Mariyammal	3:56
Total length:				16:47

=== Telugu ===
No.	Title	Lyrics	Singer(s)	Length
1.	"Manaki Manaki"	Bhaskarabhatla	Sinduri Vishal	3:22
2.	"Thangalaan War Song"	Chandrabose	G. V. Prakash Kumar, Sarath Santhosh	2:59
3.	"Pairu Kotha Paatta"	Bhaskarabhatla	Narayanan Ravishankar, Ramya Behara	3:27
4.	"Thandora Moothalatho"	Vanamali	Narayanan Ravishankar	3:03
5.	"Aavuru Thaati"	Chandrabose	Pavithra Chari	3:56
Total length:				16:47

=== Malayalam ===
No.	Title	Lyrics	Singer(s)	Length
1.	"Midukki Midukki"	Kaithapram Damodaran Namboothiri	Sinduri Vishal	3:22
2.	"Thangalaan War Song"	Rafeeq Ahamed	Sudeesh Sasikumar, Anand Sreeraj	2:59
3.	"Koythu Paattu"	Santhosh Varma	Sannidhanandan, Shikha Prabhakaran	3:27
4.	"Thambera Dichu"	Santhosh Varma	Sudhi Kalabhavan	3:03
5.	"Parariyano Yarariyano"	Santhosh Varma	Jini Kodakara	3:56
Total length:				16:47

=== Kannada ===
All lyrics are written by Varadaraj Chikkaballapura.

No.	Title	Singer(s)	Length
1.	"Nanagu Ninagu"	Sinduri Vishal	3:22
2.	"Thangalaan War Song"	Sarath Santhosh	2:59
3.	"Koylu Hadu"	Narayanan Ravishankar, Ramya Behara	3:27
4.	"Thamateya Paari"	Narayanan Ravishankar	3:03
5.	"Yaririvaro Yaririvaro"	Pavithra Chari	3:56
Total length:			16:47

=== Hindi ===
All lyrics are written by Raqueeb Alam.

No.	Title	Singer(s)	Length
1.	"Murga Murgi"	Sinduri Vishal	3:22
2.	"Thangalaan War Song"	Faisal Razi, Anand Sreeraj	2:59
3.	"Katai Gaana"	Roshan NC, Anila Rajeev	3:27
4.	"Goron Ne Ki Hai Badi"	Roshan NC	3:03
5.	"Thangalaan Oppari Song"	Punnya Pradeep	3:56
Total length:			16:47

== Personnel ==
Credits adapted from Junglee Music.

- Music composed, arranged and produced by: G. V. Prakash Kumar
- Programming: Aswin Sathya
- Backing vocals: Aishwarya Kumar, Kamalaja Rajagopal, Padmaja Sreenivasan, Lavita Lobo, Anusha Gayathri K
- Choir: Voxos-AAA Music Space, Thrissur
- Choir ensemble: Swetha Ben, Sreya Rison, Aleena Amal, Felin Paulson, Cinderella Nilson, Annceline Johnson, Amal Antony Agustin
- Choral arrangement: Amal Antony Agustin
- Rhythm: Kalyan, Hubert Maran
- Flute: Josy Alappuzha
- Bass: Naveen
- Frets, saz, dotara, ektara, khamak: Sanu P S
- Recorded at Audiogene Sound Studios (Kochi), Sounds Right Studio (Chennai), Divine Labs (Chennai)
- Recording: Amal Raj, Aswin George John, Jehovahson Alghar
- Mixing and mastering: Jehovahson Alghar
- Assistant sound engineer: Roopash Tiwari, Divine labs.
- Musicians assistance: Rajamurugan
