= Kerebete =

2024 Kannada-language film

- Theatrical release poster
- Directed by: Rajguru B
- Dialogues by: Gowrishankar SRG
- Screenplay by: Rajguru B Gowrishankar SRG
- Story by: Rajguru B
- Produced by: Jai Shankar Patel
- Starring: Gowrishankar SRG; Bindu Shivaram; Gopalkrishna Deshpande; Harini Shreekanth; Sampath maitreya
- Cinematography: Keerthan Poojaary
- Music by: Gagan Baderiya
- Production company: Janamana Cinemas
- Distributed by: Jayanna films
- Release date: 15 March 2024
- Running time: 152 minutes
- Country: India
- Language: Kannada

Kerebete is a 2024 Indian Kannada-language romantic drama film directed by Rajguru. It stars Gowrishankar SRG and Bindu Shivaram in lead roles. The film revolves around Kerebete, an annual fishing event in Malenadu.

Kerebete was released on 15 March 2024.

== Plot ==
Naga (Gowrishankar SRG) is a tough guy. He often gets into trouble and lands in jail for smuggling wood. Kerebete starts with him being released from jail.

The scene shifts to Naga participating in Kerebete, a fishing sport, near his village. It is under these circumstances that both Naga and his mother (Harini Shreekanth) are denied their due share in their father's ancestral property citing the reason that his mother is an orphan from a lower caste.

Meanwhile, Naga is in love with Meena (Bindu Shivaram). While he works hard ( read smuggling wood) to buy a piece of land to live happily ever after with his mother and his future wife, Meena's parents become aware of the romance between the two. The girl's father insults Naga badly and calls his mother names.

Soon, Meena goes missing. She returns eight months later as a pregnant woman and there is no sign of Naga.

== Cast ==
- Gowrishankar SRG as Naga
- Bindu Shivaram as Meena
- Gopalkrishna Deshpande
- Harini Shreekanth as Naga's mother
- Sampath Maitreya
- Vardhan Thirthahalli
- Shekar kardimane
- Raghu Rajananda

== Release ==
The film was released on 15 March 2024.

== Reception ==
A. Sharadhaa of The New Indian Express described Kerebete as a film that begins as a romance before developing into a suspense thriller, and praised its ability to maintain tension. She also highlighted the film's treatment of love and caste-based oppression, while noting that the screenplay is uneven in places. Harish Basavarajaiah of The Times of India rated the film 3 out of 5, praising its depiction of Malnad culture, local dialect, cinematography and climax, while noting shortcomings in the screenplay. TV9 Kannada rated the film 3.5 out of 5, praising Gowrishankar's performance, the Malnad setting, cinematography and background score, while observing that some dialogues could have been trimmed. Avinash G. Ram of Vijaya Karnataka rated the film 3 out of 5, describing it as a story of a couple caught in the complexities of caste and praising the film's Malnad setting and performances.

== Soundtrack ==
The soundtrack, composed by Gagan Baderiya

Track listing
No.	Title	Lyrics	Singer(s)	Length
1.	"Mali athu beli athu"	Pramod Maravante	Karibasava Tadakal	2:12
2.	"Malenada Gombe"	Pramod Maravante	Sai Vignesh, Aishwarya Rangarajan	4:03
3.	"Kanugale Kaledhu Hodaga"	Pramod Maravante	Siddharath Bellamannu	3:51
4.	"Bhuvana Hudukadidhe"	Ghouspheer	Kapil Kapilan	3:29
5.	"Muukha Maleyalli"	Pramod Maravante	Venkatesh DC	2:51
Total length:				15:46

== Awards ==
Award	Category	Recipient	Result	Ref.
55th International Film Festival of India (IFFI)	3 times Screening	Gowrishankar SRG	Nominated	
16th Bengaluru International Film Festival (BIFFES)	2 times screening and Nominated in Kannada cinema competition	Gowrishankar SRG	Nominated	
Prajavani Cine Sammana 2025	Best Movie	Gowrishankar SRG	Nominated	
Prajavani Cine Sammana 2025	Best Hero	Gowrishankar SRG	Nominated	
Prajavani Cine Sammana 2025	Best Cinematography	Keerthan Poojary	Nominated	
Prajavani Cine Sammana 2025	Best Editor	Jnannesh B Matad	Won	
Prajavani Cine Sammana 2025	Best Audiography & Sound Designing	Gowrishankar SRG	Won	
70th Filmfare Awards South	Critics Best Actor	Gowrishankar SRG	Won	
70th Filmfare Awards South	Best Debu Actress	Bindu Shivaram	Won	
