= Hulikal Nataraj =

Indian author and teacher

Hulikal K. Nataraj
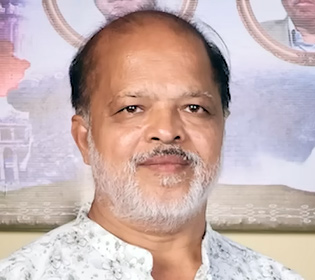
- Hulikal Nataraj in 2025
- Born: December 29, 1962 (age 63); Hulikal, Turuvekere, Tumkur, Karnataka
- Citizenship: Indian
- Education: Master of Arts in miracle busting, human psychology, B.Ed
- Occupations: Mythbuster, teacher, author and actor
- Employer: Miracle Research Centre
- Organization: Swamy Vivekananda School
- Children: 2
- Website: hulikalnataraj.weebly.com

Hulikal K. Nataraj is an Indian myth buster, teacher, author and actor in Karnataka.

He is the president of the Karnataka State Scientific Research Council and founder and chairman of State Scientific Research Parishat.

He has written books and has appeared in programs in Kannada news channels, on busting myths, miracles.

== History ==
He was born in Hulikal, Karnataka.

== Career ==
Hulikal Nataraj was inspired by Abraham Kovoor. He has worked as a teacher for more than 25 years.

He has been a myth buster in Karnataka since 1979 and has busted more 2000 miracles. He has given more than 9000 programs on miracle/myth busting, all over Karnataka.

== Filmography ==
- Blink (cameo appearance)
- Navila Kinnari (2018)
