= Filmfare Critics Award for Best Film – Tamil =

The Filmfare Critics Award for Best Film – Tamil is given by the Filmfare Magazine as part of its annual Filmfare Awards South for South Indian films. It acknowledges an encourages the filmmakers of a direction department. The award was introduced and first given in 2022.

== Winners ==
Year	Film	Director	Refs
2022	Kadaisi Vivasayi	M. Manikandan	
2023	Viduthalai Part 1	Vetrimaaran	
2024	Meiyazhagan	C. Prem Kumar	
