= Raayan (soundtrack) =

2024 soundtrack album by A.R. Rahman

- Soundtrack album cover

Soundtrack album by A. R. Rahman
- Released: 6 July 2024
- Recorded: July–December 2023
- Studio: Panchathan Record Inn, Chennai; Panchathan, Mumbai
- Genre: Feature film soundtrack
- Length: 17:57
- Language: Tamil
- Label: Sun Pictures
- Producer: A. R. Rahman

A. R. Rahman chronology
Maidaan (2024)	Raayan (2024)	Thug Life (2025)

Singles from Raayan
- 1. "Adangaatha Asuran" Released: 9 May 2024; 2. "Water Packet" Released: 24 May 2024; 3. "Raayan Rumble" Released: 5 July 2024

Raayan is the soundtrack album composed by A. R. Rahman for the 2024 Tamil-language film of the same name, directed and starring Dhanush, alongside an ensemble cast which includes Prakash Raj, S. J. Suryah, Selvaraghavan, Sundeep Kishan, Dushara Vijayan, Kalidas Jayaram, Aparna Balamurali, Varalaxmi Sarathkumar and Saravanan. The film is produced by Kalanithi Maran under Sun Pictures. The album featured five songs, with three of them being previously released as singles. It was released on 6 July 2024, coinciding with the audio launch event at Sriram Engineering College in Chennai, via Sun Pictures.

== Background ==
Raayan's soundtrack is composed by A. R. Rahman, in his fourth collaboration with Dhanush after Raanjhanaa (2013), Maryan (2013) and Atrangi Re (2021). Initially, Sean Roldan was intended to compose the film's score as he previously worked with Dhanush on Pa. Pandi and Velaiilla Pattadhari 2 (both 2017), but was ousted as the project suffered financial problems under Thenandal Studio Limited, the former producer. Despite signing nearly 30 projects at that time, Rahman accepted the offer owing to Dhanush's interest. During the musical discussions, Dhanush recalled that whenever he needed a tune, he would play one of his songs and ask for a similar one, but Rahman instead opined to do something fresh and original, which amazed the actor.

The songs were performed by Rahman, Dhanush, Santhosh Narayanan, Shweta Mohan, Arivu, ADK and Ganavya Doraiswamy. Street musician Gana Kadhar made his debut in the Tamil film music scene, by writing lyrics for the song "Water Packet". Describing the song's process, Rahman recalled that the music team had selected the lyrics from nearly 30 people before finalising Kadhar. New York-based Tamil singer Ganavya Doraiswamy performed the song "Oh Raaya" as her first song for a feature film. She also described her collaboration with Rahman, who was very close to spirituality that resonated with her own journey, as she seldom performs songs for films. Speaking to Indulge Express, Doraiswamy added "Usually in cinema songs, we see a lot of sexualised lyrics and so on. But in the music of Rahman sir, the connection with spirituality takes over and that is something I could connect with."

== Release ==
The first song from the film "Adangatha Asuran" written and co-performed by Dhanush with Rahman was released as a single on 9 May 2024. The second single "Water Packet" performed by Narayanan and Mohan was released on 24 May. The third song "Raayan Rumble" was released on 5 July. The film's music launch was held at the Sri Sai Ram Engineering College in Chennai, the following day, with the cast and crew in attendance and featured musical performances by Rahman and his team. The songs "Oh Raaya" and "Odatha Da Odatha Da" were released along with the album on that date through audio streaming platforms.

== Track listing ==
Tamil
No.	Title	Lyrics	Singer(s)	Length
1.	"Adangaatha Asuran"	Dhanush	A. R. Rahman, Dhanush	4:08
2.	"Water Packet"	Gana Kadhar	Santhosh Narayanan, Shweta Mohan	4:06
3.	"Raayan Rumble"	Arivu	Arivu	3:31
4.	"Odatha Da Odatha Da"	ADK	ADK	2:45
5.	"Oh Raaya"	Dhanush	A. R. Rahman, Ganavya Doraisamy	3:28
Total length:				17:57

Telugu
No.	Title	Lyrics	Singer(s)	Length
1.	"Thala Vanchi Eragade"	Chandrabose	Hemachandra, Sarath Santhosh	4:08
2.	"Peechu Mithay"	Ramajogayya Sastry	Vijay Prakash, Haripriya	4:06
3.	"Raayan Rumble"	Rakendu Mouli	Arivu	3:31
4.	"Urakara Urakara"	Rakendu Mouli	Rakendu Mouli	2:45
5.	"Oh Raaya"	Kalpradah	A. R. Rahman, Ganavya Doraisamy	3:28
Total length:				17:57

Hindi
No.	Title	Lyrics	Singer(s)	Length
1.	"Koi Tod Na Iska"	Kumaar	Sukhwinder Singh	4:08
2.	"Mood Kirkira"	Kumaar	Nakash Aziz, Antara Nandy	4:06
3.	"Raayan Rumble"	MC Heam	Arivu	3:31
4.	"Sarvsresth"	MC Heam	Nanku	2:45
5.	"Oh Raaya"	Nirmika Singh	Runa Rizvi	3:28
Total length:				17:57

== Background score ==
Raayan

Film score by A. R. Rahman
- Released: 5 December 2024
- Recorded: 2023–2024
- Studio: Panchathan Record Inn, Chennai; Panchathan, Mumbai
- Genre: Film score
- Length: 26:27
- Language: Tamil
- Label: Sun Pictures
- Producer: A. R. Rahman

No.	Title	Length
1.	"Raayan's Lullaby"	2:21
2.	"World of Raayan"	1:13
3.	"Danger's Call"	1:06
4.	"Hello Boys"	1:37
5.	"The Countdown Begins"	1:41
6.	"The Night Turns Ugly"	2:01
7.	"Brothers in Arms"	2:01
8.	"Echos of Violence"	2:14
9.	"Guardian Angel"	1:49
10.	"Whispers of Deceit"	3:25
11.	"Aigiri Nandini"	1:06
12.	"Loss"	1:30
13.	"The Lone Wolf"	1:32
14.	"Raayan Rules"	0:56
15.	"The Raavan Lament"	1:04
16.	"A Secret Pact"	0:46
Total length:		26:27

== Live performance ==
On 27 July 2024, Rahman and his team hosted a concert at the Bukit Jalil National Stadium in Kuala Lumpur, Malaysia, to commemorate his 32nd year of his film music career. The team performed all the popular songs from Rahman's films, while Rahman performed a snippet of "Adangaatha Asuran" at the concert. Dhanush shared an Instagram post to share a video of his performance, where he mentioned that "I never imagined when I wrote these two simple words "usure needhane" (transl. You are the life) in your magical melody that it would resonate with millions and become iconic."

== Reception ==
Janani K. of India Today wrote that Rahman's "background score and songs are perfect for it." Divya Nair of Rediff.com and Latha Srinivasan of Hindustan Times described it as "fascinating" and "brilliant" that elevated the film. Swathi P. Ajith of Onmanorama wrote that "[Rahman's score] adds significant weight to each moment. The music serves as the movie's binding force-clever, thunderous, and powerful." Avinash Ramachandran of The Indian Express wrote "AR Rahman stringing it all together with a score that elevates Raayan to a different plane altogether. And we ask ourselves… Isn’t this the Rahman we have been wanting for a while now?" Sowmya Rajendran of The News Minute wrote "AR Rahman's background score works well for the big and small moments" but found the song placements to be forced.

== Personnel ==
Credits adapted from Sun Pictures.

Album credits

- Music composer, arranger and producer – A. R. Rahman
- Music supervisor – A. H. Kaashif
- Project manager – Karthik Sekaran
- Language supervisor – Aravind Crescendo
- Choral supervision – Suryansh, Sarath Santosh, Sreekanth Hariharan
- Additional programming – Santhosh Dhayanidhi, Prashanth Venkat, Nakul Abhyankar, Suryansh
- Recording engineers:
  - Panchathan Record Inn, Chennai – Suresh Permal, Karthik Sekaran, Aravind Crescendo, Sathish V Saravanan
  - Panchathan Studios, Mumbai – Dilshaad Shabbir Shaikh, Harshil Pathak, Naval Chikhliya
  - Bosco Studios, London – Charles Bosco
- Mixing – Pradeep Menon
- Mastering:
  - Studio – Suresh Permal
  - Dolby Atmos – Riyasdeen Riyan
- Head of technical service – Riyasdeen Riyan
- Musician coordinator – Samidurai R., Abdul Haiyum

Performer credits

- Guitar – Keba Jeremiah
- Bass – Prashanth Venkat
- Flute – Kamalakar
- Rhythm – Krishna Kishore, Iniyan
- Nadaswaram – Mambalam Sivakumar
- Stringed instruments – Tapas Roy
- Strings – Chennai Strings Orchestra, Sunshine Orchestra (supervised by Shubham Bhat)
- Additional vocals – Shridhar Ramesh, Yadu Krishnan, Aravind Karneshwaran, Prasanna Adhisesha, Shenbagaraj, Deepak Blue, Akshaya Shivkumar, Aparna Narayanan, Aparna Harikumar, Priyanka NK, Maanasi G Kannan, Vrusha Balu, Deepthi Suresh

== Chart performance ==
Chart	Song	Peak position	Ref.
India (Billboard)	"Water Packet"	13	
Asian Music Chart (OCC)	"Adangatha Asuran"	2	
Asian Music Chart (OCC)	"Water Packet"	1	
