= Photo (2023 film) =

Indian Kannada-language drama film

- Directed by: Utsav Gonwar
- Written by: Utsav Gonwar
- Produced by: Utsav Gonwar
- Starring: Mahadev Hadapad; Sandhya Arakere; Veeresh Gonwar; Jahangeer MS
- Cinematography: Dinesh Divakaran
- Edited by: Shivaraj Mehu
- Music by: Rai Hiremath
- Production company: Masari Talkies
- Distributed by: Prakash Raj; KRG Studios
- Release dates: 2023 (BIFFes); 15 March 2024 (India)
- Country: India
- Language: Kannada

Photo is a 2023 Indian Kannada-language drama film directed, written and produced by Utsav Gonwar starring Mahadev Hadapad, Sandhya Arakere, Veeresh Gonwar and Jahangeer MS. The film premiered at the Bengaluru International Film Festival in 2023 before getting a theatrical release in 2024.

== Cast ==
- Mahadev Hadapad as Gynappa
- Sandhya Arakere as Gangamma
- Veeresh Gonwar as Durgya
- Jahangeer MS

== Reception ==
Vivek M. V. of The Hindu wrote, "Photo has long stretches marked by silence, but the lack of dialogue doesn’t mean the film is uninteresting. Utsav uses striking visuals to convey his points. The father-son duo’s back-breaking journey on the road might feel repetitive, but it drives home the film’s point of how monotonous and laborious the entire episode was for the migrants". Sridevi S. of The Times of India rated the film 4/5 stars and wrote, "Photo is not your commercial film, but a mirror to the realities of society. The movie is a must watch in theatres". A. Sharadhaa of The New Indian Express rated the film 3.5/5 and wrote, "With its authentic portrayals, the film not only captures the essence of a turbulent era but also unveils the innate resilience ingrained within each of us". A critic from Deccan Herald wrote, "Photo is a moving reminder of the dark days of the pandemic". Sunayana Suresh of The South First wrote, "Photo is a film that is far removed from the usual commercial masala fare. But it has something that can stir emotions in everyone".
