= Amaran (soundtrack) =

Amaran (Original Motion Picture Soundtrack)
- Soundtrack album cover

Soundtrack album by G. V. Prakash Kumar
- Released: 2 November 2024
- Recorded: May 2023–August 2024
- Studios: Divine Labs, Chennai; Sonic Island Studios, Kochi; Sounds Right Studios, Chennai; Soundtown Studios, Chennai; Audiogene Sound Studios, Kochi; SKR Studios, Kochi; Voice and Vision Studios, Chennai; 20db Studios, Chennai
- Genre: Feature film soundtrack
- Length: 26:48
- Label: Saregama
- Producer: G. V. Prakash Kumar

G. V. Prakash Kumar chronology
| Thangalaan (2024) | Amaran (Original Motion Picture Soundtrack) (2024) | Lucky Baskhar (2024) |
External audio
- Official Audio Jukebox on YouTube

Singles from Amaran
- 1. "Sai Pallavi's Intro" Released: 28 September 2024; 2. "Hey Minnale" Released: 4 October 2024; 3. "Vennilavu Saaral" Released: 17 October 2024; 4. "Por Veeran (Azadi)" Released: 19 October 2024; 5. "Uyirey" Released: 30 October 2024

Amaran (Original Motion Picture Soundtrack) is the soundtrack album composed by G. V. Prakash Kumar for the 2024 Tamil-language film of the same name, directed by Rajkumar Periasamy starring Sivakarthikeyan and Sai Pallavi as Major Mukund Varadarajan and Indhu Rebecca Varghese. The film is a joint production venture of Raaj Kamal Films International and Sony Pictures Films India. The soundtrack featured eight songs with lyrics written by Karthik Netha, Yugabharathi, Vivek and Arivu. It was preceded by five singles, and the album was released under the Saregama label on 2 November 2024.

== Development ==
Amaran is Prakash's maiden collaboration with both Sivakarthikeyan and Rajkumar. Initially Harris Jayaraj was considered to compose the musical score, before Prakash being chosen. Prakash's inclusion was confirmed in May 2023, and soon afterwards, he started composing the tunes while parallelly working on other projects. According to Periasamy, Prakash had composed five songs for the film, with two of them being fast-paced numbers. In June 2024, he revealed that he had almost completed working on the film's music. By late-September, it was revealed that Prakash had composed two more tracks after watching the film's final edit.

== Composition ==
In an interaction to fans on X (formerly Twitter), Prakash revealed that an "energetic love song" is set to be released as the first single from the album after production house's approval. In late September, the song was eventually titled as "Hey Minnale" and being Prakash's 700th song he composed. It featured lyrics written by Karthik Netha and sung by Haricharan and Shweta Mohan. The song appears in the film when Mukund (Sivakarthikeyan) meets Indhu Rebecca Varghese (Sai Pallavi) during their studies at Madras Christian College.

The song "Uyirey" was written by Vivek and sung by Nakul Abhyankar and his wife Ramya Bhat. Nakul stated that the song was sent by Prakash in April 2024, without lyrics and a rough version of the song with his vocals and was asked to arrange the instrumentation. Before Nakul's involvement, other singers also performed their renditions before their version was finalized. Ramya, who was nine months pregnant at that time, recorded a rendition of the track which worked well. "Vennilavu Saaral" featured lyrics written by Yugabharathi and sung by Kapil Kapilan and Rakshita Suresh. The songs were picturized on the relationship between Mukund and Indu during their marriage and post-marriage.

Arivu wrote and performed two montage songs: "Azadi" and "Por Veeran". Two emotional tracks, "Vaane Vaane" and "Kanave" were featured in the film, written by Yugabharathi and performed by Faisal Razi and Saindhavi.

== Marketing and release ==
The music rights were acquired by Saregama. The film's audio launch was held at the Sri Sai Ram Engineering College in Chennai on 18 October 2024, with the cast and crew in attendance. However, the songs were not released on that date. The album featuring eight tracks was released on 2 November 2024, two days after the film's release.

=== Singles ===
The theme music composed for the introductory promotional teaser of Sai Pallavi was released as an audio-only single on 28 September 2024. The first single from the film "Hey Minnale" was released on 4 October 2024. The second single "Vennilavu Saaral" was released on 17 October, a day prior to the audio launch, and the song "Por Veeran (Azadi)" was released as the third single on 19 October, after the audio launch. The fourth single "Uyirey" was released on 30 October.

== Critical reception ==
Janani K. of India Today wrote "Composer GV Prakash's music and background score does the perfect job of elevating the mood of the film." Avinash Ramachandran of The Indian Express described it as a "rousing score". Gopinath Rajendran of The Hindu complimented Prakash's work in the film, saying "apart from accentuating the mass sequences with rousing music, skillfully uses silence during the poignant moments". Latha Srinivasan of Hindustan Times wrote "the BGM and songs by GV Prakash add a lot of depth to this emotional film." Kirubakar Purushothaman of News18 wrote "GV Prakash seems to have been instructed to keep the background score subdued, avoiding the typical cues for audience applause and cheers."

== Track listing ==
=== Tamil ===
| No. | Title | Lyrics | Singer(s) | Length |
|---|---|---|---|---|
| 1. | "Sai Pallavi's Intro" | — | Instrumental | 1:02 |
| 2. | "Hey Minnale" | Karthik Netha | Haricharan, Shweta Mohan | 3:50 |
| 3. | "Vennilavu Saaral" | Yugabharathi | Kapil Kapilan, Rakshita Suresh | 3:36 |
| 4. | "Por Veeran (Azadi)" | Arivu | Arivu | 3:15 |
| 5. | "Uyirey" | Vivek | Nakul Abhyankar, Ramya Bhat Abhyankar | 3:33 |
| 6. | "Vaane Vaane" | Yugabharathi | Faisal Razi | 4:48 |
| 7. | "Amara" | Arivu | Arivu | 2:49 |
| 8. | "Kanave" | Yugabharathi | Saindhavi | 3:55 |
| Total length: | | | | 26:48 |

Extended Soundtrack
| No. | Title | Lyrics | Singer(s) | Length |
|---|---|---|---|---|
| 9. | "Nagarum Neramae" | Jayashree Mathimaran | Punnya Pradeep | 1:13 |

=== Telugu ===
| No. | Title | Lyrics | Singer(s) | Length |
|---|---|---|---|---|
| 1. | "Sai Pallavi's Intro" | — | Instrumental | 1:02 |
| 2. | "Hey Rangule" | Ramajogayya Sastry | Anurag Kulkarni, Ramya Behara | 3:50 |
| 3. | "Vendiminnu Neevanta" | Ramajogayya Sastry | Krishna Tejasvi, Sireesha Bhagavatula | 3:36 |
| 4. | "Azadi" | Krishna Kanth | Anand Sreeraj | 3:15 |
| 5. | "Usure Usure" | Krishna Kanth | Soorya Shyam Gopal, Swetha Ashok | 3:33 |
| 6. | "Vaane Vaane" | Krishna Kanth | Bharath Sajikumar | 4:48 |
| 7. | "Amara Samara" | Krishna Kanth | Vipin Xavier | 2:49 |
| 8. | "Kalave" | Krishna Kanth | Sruthy Sivadas | 3:55 |
| Total length: | | | | 26:48 |

Extended Soundtrack
| No. | Title | Singer(s) | Length |
|---|---|---|---|
| 9. | "Nadhichi E Kaalam" | Punnya Pradeep | 1:13 |

=== Kannada ===
All lyrics are written by Varadaraj Chikkaballapura.

| No. | Title | Singer(s) | Length |
|---|---|---|---|
| 1. | "Sai Pallavi's Intro" | Instrumental | 1:02 |
| 2. | "Hey Kogile" | Bharath Sajikumar, Sruthy Sivadas | 3:50 |
| 3. | "Belli Moda" | Bharath Sajikumar, Sruthy Sivadas | 3:36 |
| 4. | "Azadi" | Anand Sreeraj | 3:15 |
| 5. | "Usire Usire" | Soorya Shyam Gopal, Swetha Ashok | 3:33 |
| 6. | "Maleye Maleye" | Akhil Dev | 4:48 |
| 7. | "Amara Samara" | Anand Sreeraj | 2:49 |
| 8. | "Kanase" | Sruthy Sivadas | 3:55 |
| Total length: | | | 26:48 |

Extended Soundtrack
| No. | Title | Singer(s) | Length |
|---|---|---|---|
| 9. | "Idu Nadeyalu Samayame" | Punnya Pradeep | 1:13 |

=== Hindi ===
All lyrics are written by Sajeev Sarathie.

| No. | Title | Singer(s) | Length |
|---|---|---|---|
| 1. | "Sai Pallavi's Intro" | Instrumental | 1:02 |
| 2. | "Hey Soniye" | Bharath Sajikumar, Sruthy Sivadas | 3:50 |
| 3. | "Chand Mera Dil" | Bharath Sajikumar, Sruthy Sivadas | 3:36 |
| 4. | "Azadi" | Anand Sreeraj | 3:15 |
| 5. | "Maan Re" | Soorya Shyam Gopal, Shaan, Swetha Ashok | 3:33 |
| 6. | "Jaage Jaage" | Faisal Razi | 4:48 |
| 7. | "Amara Samara" | Anand Sreeraj | 2:49 |
| 8. | "Hardam Hardam" | Sruthy Sivadas | 3:55 |
| Total length: | | | 26:48 |

Extended Soundtrack
| No. | Title | Singer(s) | Length |
|---|---|---|---|
| 9. | "Thoda Sa" | Punnya Pradeep | 1:13 |

=== Malayalam ===
All lyrics are written by Vinayak Sasikumar.

| No. | Title | Singer(s) | Length |
|---|---|---|---|
| 1. | "Sai Pallavi's Intro" | Instrumental | 1:02 |
| 2. | "Hey Thennale" | Bharath Sajikumar, Sruthy Sivadas | 3:50 |
| 3. | "Vennilaavin Chaaral Nee" | Kapil Kapilan, Sruthy Sivadas | 3:36 |
| 4. | "Azadi" | Anand Sreeraj | 3:15 |
| 5. | "Uyire Uyire" | Sooraj Santhosh, Swetha Ashok | 3:33 |
| 6. | "Vaanam Vaanam" | Faisal Razi | 4:48 |
| 7. | "Amara Samara" | Anand Sreeraj | 2:49 |
| 8. | "Kanave" | Sruthy Sivadas | 3:55 |
| Total length: | | | 26:48 |

Extended Soundtrack
| No. | Title | Singer(s) | Length |
|---|---|---|---|
| 9. | "Neengun Neramae" | Punnya Pradeep | 1:13 |

== Personnel ==
Credits adapted from Saregama.

- G. V. Prakash Kumar – composer (all tracks), producer (all tracks)
- Aswin Sathya – music programmer (tracks 2, 3, 5, 6)
- Urban Thozha – music programmer (tracks 4, 7)
- Narendar S – music programmer (tracks 1, 3, 6, 8)
- Sai Rakshith – violin (tracks 1, 2, 5, 6, 8)
- Kalyan – rhythm (tracks 1, 2, 7)
- Sandeep Mohan – guitar (track 1), bass (track 1)
- Lalit Talluri – flute (tracks 2, 5, 6, 8)
- Punnya Pradeep – chorus (track 3)
- Swetha Ashok – chorus (track 3)
- Jerine Anna – chorus (track 3)
- Neethusha AC – chorus (track 3)
- Akash S Menon – saz (track 3), mandolin (track 3)
- Joel Jebnesan Jacob C – guitar (track 4, 7), mandolin (track 4, 7)
- Abinandan R – guitar (track 5)
- Roopesh Tiwari – sound engineer (Divine Labs, Chennai) [all tracks]
- Sanjai Arakkal – recording engineer (Sonic Island Studios, Kochi) [track 2, 3]
- Ashwin George John – recording engineer (Sounds Right Studios, Chennai) [track 2, 3]
- Midhun Manoj – recording engineer (Soundtown Studios, Chennai) [track 2]
- Sreerag Suresh – recording engineer (SKR Studios, Kochi) [track 2]
- Shiju Ediyatheril – recording engineer (Audiogene Sound Studios, Kochi) [track 3]
- Lijesh Kumar TK – recording engineer (Voice and Vision Studios, Chennai) [track 3]
- Hariharan – recording engineer (20db Studios, Chennai) [track 4]
- Jehovahson Alghar – mixing and mastering engineer (Divine Labs, Chennai) [all tracks]
- Rajamurugan – studio assistance (Divine Labs, Chennai)
