= Filmfare Critics Award for Best Film – Malayalam =

The Filmfare Critics Award for Best Film – Malayalam is given by the Filmfare magazine as part of its annual Filmfare Awards South for South Indian films. It acknowledges an encourages the filmmakers of a direction department. The award was first given in 2022.

== Winners ==
Year	Film	Director	Refs.
2022	Ariyippu	Mahesh Narayanan	
2023	Kaathal – The Core	Jeo Baby	
2024	Ullozhukku	Christo Tomy	
2024	Kishkindha Kaandam	Dinjith Ayyathan	
