= Saripodhaa Sanivaaram (soundtrack) =

2024 soundtrack album by Jakes Bejoy

- Soundtrack album cover

Soundtrack album by Jakes Bejoy
- Released: 25 August 2024
- Recorded: 2023–2024
- Genre: Feature film soundtrack
- Length: 39:49
- Language: Telugu
- Label: Sony Music India
- Producer: Jakes Bejoy

Jakes Bejoy chronology
Adios Amigo (2024)	Saripodhaa Sanivaaram (2024)	Mechanic Rocky (2024)
External audio
- Audio Jukebox on YouTube

Singles from Saripodhaa Sanivaaram
- 1. "Garam Garam" Released: 15 June 2024; 2. "Ullaasam" Released: 13 July 2024; 3. "Sari Ma Pa" Released: 24 August 2024

Saripodhaa Sanivaaram is the soundtrack to the 2024 film of the same name directed by Vivek Athreya and produced by D. V. V. Danayya and Kalyan Dasari under DVV Entertainment, starring Nani and S. J. Suryah. The album featured 12 tracks composed by Jakes Bejoy with lyrics for the songs being written by Sanapati Bharadwaj Patrudu, Sanare, Krishna Kanth and Karthik Sachin. The lyrics for the dubbed versions were written by Mani Amudhavan and Mohan Rajan in Tamil, Santhosh Varma and Joe Paul in Malayalam, Hridaya Shiva in Kannada, Siddhant Kaushal and Vikram Edke in Hindi. Preceded by three singles, the album was released under the Sony Music India label on 25 August 2024.

== Development ==
In October 2023, during the film's launch, it was announced that Jakes Bejoy would compose the film's music and background score, in his first collaboration with Nani and Athreya. Bejoy recalled that his compositions for the Malayalam film King of Kotha (2023) attributed to his involvement in the project as Athreya liked the film's soundscape which was a blend of North Indian percussive music with western orchestral beats.

Following his involvement, he composed the musical piece for the promotional title teaser Unchained. Bejoy wanted to bring that "pucca Marvel superhero mood" making it standout from regular commercial films and the announcement video helped him to come up with a theme. Bejoy further composed separate themes for the promotional materials, such as Surya's (Nani) and Daya's (Suryah) character teasers that helped him to develop the soundscape for the project. He added "Every two months we were working on a new theme. By the time four videos came out, we had four solid themes, and the audience already registered it. My duty was just to use those themes at the appropriate places in the film."

Once he had the themes ready, Bejoy focused on the film's high moments. He further recalled that the post-interval fight sequence between Surya and Daya's planning moments that culminated in the pub sequence where Surya attacks Daya, was a challenging moment where there are no dialogues and the entire sequence being musically driven. It took him five days to get the moment right, adding "That build-up is what worked—the way it starts to reach a crescendo. It's a technique in scoring." All the songs in the film had a different musical vibe. The promotional song "Sa Ri Ma Pa" was targeted for the Instagram Reels audience.

== Release ==
The film's music rights were acquired by Sony Music India. Soon after the announcement, the song "Unchained" which soundtracked the film's announcement trailer, was released on 19 February 2024. The track "Samavarthi" which was featured in Surya's character teaser, released on Nani's birthday (24 February 2024) was separately released as an audio format on 28 February 2024.

The album was preceded by three singles—the first song "Garam Garam" was released as a single on 15 June 2024. It is the introduction number for Surya's character, that featured lyrics written by Sanapati Bharadwaj Patrudu and sung by Vishal Dadlani. The second single "Ullasam" was released on 13 July 2024. A romantic number picturized on Surya and Charulatha (Mohan), the song had lyrics written by Sanare and performed by Sanjith Hegde and Krishna Lasya Muthyala. The third single titled "Sa Ri Ma Pa", a promotional video song featuring Nani and Mohan, was released on 24 August 2024. The song featured lyrics written by Krishna Kanth and performed by Karthik. The full album was released on 25 August 2024.

== Track listing ==
Telugu
No.	Title	Lyrics	Singer(s)	Length
1.	"Garam Garam"	Sanapati Bharadwaj Patrudu	Vishal Dadlani	4:10
2.	"Ullaasam"	Sanare	Sanjith Hegde, Krishna Lasya Muthyala	4:42
3.	"Sa Ri Ma Pa"	Krishna Kanth	Karthik	4:38
4.	"Laalijo Raagam"	Sanapati Bharadwaj Patrudu	Madhura Dhara Talluri	4:21
5.	"Malupero"	Krishna Kanth	P V N S Rohit	4:53
6.	"Veta Vinodham"	Sanapati Bharadwaj Patrudu	Deepak Blue	2:50
7.	"Dimbhaka"	Karthik Sachin	Saicharan Bhaskaruni, Pranav Chaganty	2:35
8.	"Bhaga Bhaga"	Sanapati Bharadwaj Patrudu	Chorus	2:56
9.	"Samavarthi"	Instrumental	Jakes Bejoy	1:25
10.	"Unchained"	Sanapati Bharadwaj Patrudu	Jakes Bejoy	2:47
11.	"Not A Teaser (Theme)"	Sanapati Bharadwaj Patrudu	Jakes Bejoy	1:20
12.	"Shiva Thandavame (Trailer Theme)"	Sanapati Bharadwaj Patrudu	Jakes Bejoy	3:10
Total length:				39:49

Tamil
No.	Title	Lyrics	Singer(s)	Length
1.	"Garam Garam"	Mani Amudhavan	Sivam	4:10
2.	"Ullaasam"	Mohan Rajan	Sanjith Hegde, Krishna Lasya Muthyala	4:42
3.	"Sa Ri Ma Pa"	Mohan Rajan	PVNS Rohit	4:38
4.	"Aariro"	Mohan Rajan	Madhura Dhara Talluri	4:21
5.	"Oru Manam"	Mohan Rajan	Anirudh Suswaram	4:53
6.	"Puli Da"	Mohan Rajan	Deepak Blue	2:50
7.	"Raajali Da"	Mohan Rajan	Deepak Blue	2:35
8.	"Bhaga Bhaga"	Sanapati Bharadwaj Patrudu	Chorus	2:56
9.	"Samavarthi"	Instrumental	Jakes Bejoy	1:25
10.	"Unchained"	Sanapati Bharadwaj Patrudu	Jakes Bejoy	2:47
11.	"Not A Teaser (Theme)"	Sanapati Bharadwaj Patrudu	Jakes Bejoy	1:20
12.	"Shiva Thandavame (Trailer Theme)"	Sanapati Bharadwaj Patrudu	Jakes Bejoy	3:10
Total length:				39:51

Malayalam
No.	Title	Lyrics	Singer(s)	Length
1.	"Garam Garam"	Santhosh Varma	Anand Sreeraj	4:10
2.	"Ullaasam"	Joe Paul	Devanand SP, Sruthy Sivadas	4:42
3.	"Sa Ri Ma Pa"	Joe Paul	Najim Arshad	4:38
4.	"Vaarilam Raagam"	Joe Paul	Madhura Dhara Talluri	4:21
5.	"Iravukal"	Joe Paul	Akhil J. Chand	4:53
6.	"Puli Ya"	Joe Paul	Anand Sreeraj	2:50
7.	"Dimbhaka"	Joe Paul	Anand Sreeraj	2:35
8.	"Bhaga Bhaga"	Sanapati Bharadwaj Patrudu	Chorus	2:56
9.	"Samavarthi"	Instrumental	Jakes Bejoy	1:25
10.	"Unchained"	Sanapati Bharadwaj Patrudu	Jakes Bejoy	2:47
11.	"Not A Teaser (Theme)"	Sanapati Bharadwaj Patrudu	Jakes Bejoy	1:20
12.	"Shiva Thandavame (Trailer Theme)"	Sanapati Bharadwaj Patrudu	Jakes Bejoy	3:10
Total length:				39:49

Kannada
No.	Title	Lyrics	Singer(s)	Length
1.	"Garam Garam"	Hridaya Shiva	Sivam	4:10
2.	"Ullaasam"	Hridaya Shiva	Sanjith Hegde, Krishna Lasya Muthyala	4:42
3.	"Sa Ri Ma Pa"	Hridaya Shiva	PVNS Rohit	4:38
4.	"Laali Jo Laali"	Hridaya Shiva	Madhura Dhara Talluri	4:21
5.	"Hombelaku"	Hridaya Shiva	Anirudh Suswaram	4:53
6.	"Huliyo"	Hridaya Shiva	Deepak Blue	2:50
7.	"Nade Nade"	Hridaya Shiva	Saicharan Bhaskaruni	2:35
8.	"Bhaga Bhaga"	Sanapati Bharadwaj Patrudu	Chorus	2:56
9.	"Samavarthi"	Instrumental	Jakes Bejoy	1:25
10.	"Unchained"	Sanapati Bharadwaj Patrudu	Jakes Bejoy	2:47
11.	"Not A Teaser (Theme)"	Sanapati Bharadwaj Patrudu	Jakes Bejoy	1:20
12.	"Shiva Thandavame (Trailer Theme)"	Sanapati Bharadwaj Patrudu	Jakes Bejoy	3:10
Total length:				39:49

Hindi
No.	Title	Lyrics	Singer(s)	Length
1.	"Garam Garam"	Siddhant Kaushal	Vivek Hariharan	4:10
2.	"Ullaasam"	Siddhant Kaushal	Sanjith Hegde, Krishna Lasya Muthyala	4:42
3.	"Sa Ri Ma Pa"	Siddhant Kaushal	PVNS Rohit	4:38
4.	"Laalijo Raagam"	Siddhant Kaushal	Madhura Dhara Talluri	4:21
5.	"Malupero"	Siddhant Kaushal	Anirudh Suswaram	4:53
6.	"Veta Vinodham"	Vikram Edke	Deepak Blue	2:50
7.	"Dimbhaka"	Vikram Edke	Saicharan Bhaskaruni	2:35
8.	"Bhaga Bhaga"	Sanapati Bharadwaj Patrudu	Chorus	2:56
9.	"Samavarthi"	Instrumental	Jakes Bejoy	1:25
10.	"Unchained"	Sanapati Bharadwaj Patrudu	Jakes Bejoy	2:47
11.	"Not A Teaser (Theme)"	Sanapati Bharadwaj Patrudu	Jakes Bejoy	1:20
12.	"Shiva Thandavame (Trailer Theme)"	Sanapati Bharadwaj Patrudu	Jakes Bejoy	3:10
Total length:				39:49

== Background score ==
Saripodhaa Sanivaaram

Film score by Jakes Bejoy
- Released: 15 September 2024
- Recorded: 2023–2024
- Genre: Film score
- Length: 1:40:01
- Language: Telugu
- Label: Sony Music India
- Producer: Jakes Bejoy
External audio
- Saripodhaa Sanivaaram - OST Jukebox on YouTube

Following the reception for the film's background score, Bejoy announced that the score would be separately released as an album after the film's theatrical run. On 15 September 2024, Sony Music India released the original soundtrack consisting of the film's background score. The album consisted of 73 tracks that runs for 100 minutes.

No.	Title	Length
1.	"Modhalu"	0:55
2.	"Chayadevi Suryakantham"	1:33
3.	"Naa Kallu"	1:02
4.	"Surya's Rage"	0:57
5.	"Amma Maata"	1:33
6.	"Nijamaina Kopam – The Question"	1:04
7.	"Amma Eeroju"	1:06
8.	"Saripodhaa Sanivaaram"	1:13
9.	"Sneaky Shankaram"	0:34
10.	"Surya's Saturday"	1:22
11.	"Faasil – Narayana Prabha"	1:40
12.	"Naku Kopam Ochindi"	1:26
13.	"Sunday to Friday"	2:23
14.	"Where's My Kallu"	1:00
15.	"Fake Kallu"	1:13
16.	"Bhadra's Wedding"	1:29
17.	"Theertham Gunasekhar"	1:51
18.	"Constable Charulatha"	0:53
19.	"CI Dayanand"	1:10
20.	"Wrong Judgement"	1:23
21.	"Peddhoda? Chinnoda?"	1:52
22.	"Very Important Person"	0:37
23.	"Daya's Madness"	1:51
24.	"Perfume"	1:42
25.	"Life of Sokulapalem"	1:00
26.	"Charu Goes to Sokulapalem"	1:37
27.	"Eduru Debba"	0:41
28.	"Sense Unda"	1:17
29.	"Potharu Motham Potharu"	1:10
30.	"Bottle Cap & Scooty Pep"	1:49
31.	"Nani Samantha"	1:42
32.	"Be Happy"	1:04
33.	"Coffee Tea Water Bottle"	1:22
34.	"The Humiliation"	1:26
35.	"Anger Unleashed"	1:08
36.	"Silent Victims"	2:12
37.	"Adugu"	1:53
38.	"Yamana Dhamana"	2:36
39.	"Aatavidupu"	1:12
40.	"Surya's Mission"	1:11
41.	"Plotting Ideas"	2:13
42.	"A Vigilante"	0:37
43.	"Targets Locked"	0:36
44.	"Sanivaaram Modhalu"	1:07
45.	"Sister Decides to Go Home"	1:47
46.	"Dizzy Dance"	3:35
47.	"Daya's Plan B"	1:06
48.	"12 o'clock"	1:34
49.	"Faasil the 10-Minute Guy"	0:40
50.	"Clash of Rages"	1:46
51.	"The Aftermath"	0:58
52.	"Annayya Thammudu"	2:21
53.	"In Search of Sanivaaramodu"	1:49
54.	"Saripoindi Sanivaaram"	1:25
55.	"Daya Meets an LIC Agent"	0:30
56.	"Dhaagudu Moothalu"	3:13
57.	"The Massacre"	2:14
58.	"Father's Advice"	1:17
59.	"Nijamaina Kopam – The Answer"	0:55
60.	"Sokulapalem's Hope"	0:26
61.	"Finding Bottle Cap"	1:02
62.	"Aakhari Sanivaaram"	1:03
63.	"The Reunion"	0:39
64.	"Daya's Ecstasy"	0:53
65.	"The Beginning of the End"	1:26
66.	"Shiva Thandavame"	0:47
67.	"Sahanam Nasinchindi"	0:59
68.	"Modhati Adugu"	0:54
69.	"Courage Prevails"	0:29
70.	"The Battle of Rages"	2:14
71.	"Puraane Zamaane Mein"	0:58
72.	"Surya Meets Kallu"	0:51
73.	"And the Saturdays Continue"	3:28
Total length:		1:40:01

== Reception ==
Sangeetha Devi Dundoo of The Hindu and Avinash Ramachandran of The Indian Express called the score "pulsating" and "adrenaline pumping". Janani K. of India Today wrote "Composer Jakes Bejoy's pulsating background music enhances the theatrical moments. However, his songs are quite forgettable." Balakrishna Ganesan of The News Minute wrote "Jakes Bejoy's music is a mild let-down, as his background scores are too overpowering and loud." Neeshita Nyayapati of Hindustan Times wrote "The background score by Jakes Bejoy, in particular, ebbs and flows with Surya's mood, making for an immersive experience and adding depth to a story that might otherwise come across as run-of-the-mill."
