= ARM (soundtrack) =

- Album cover

Soundtrack album by Dhibu Ninan Thomas
- Released: 26 September 2024
- Recorded: 2022–2024
- Studio: Grace Records, Chennai; Mystic Room, Chennai; 20db Studios, Chennai; K7 Studios, Kochi; Audiogene Sound Studios, Kochi; New Edge Studios, Mumbai; Rottenblier Utica, Budapest
- Genre: Feature film soundtrack
- Length: 16:13
- Language: Malayalam
- Label: Think Music
- Producer: Dhibu Ninan Thomas

Dhibu Ninan Thomas chronology
Chithha (2023)	ARM (2024)	Diesel (2025)

Singles from ARM
- 1. "Kiliye" Released: 2 September 2024; 2. "Angu Vaana Konilu" Released: 14 September 2024

ARM (Note: Abbreviation for Ajayante Randam Moshanam) is the soundtrack album to the 2024 film of the same name directed by Jithin Laal from a script written by Sujith Nambiar and produced by Listin Stephen and Dr. Zachariah Thomas under Magic Frames and UGM Entertainments. The film stars Tovino Thomas in triple roles alongside Basil Joseph, Krithi Shetty, Surabhi Lakshmi and Aishwarya Rajesh amongst others. The soundtrack featured five songs composed by Dhibu Ninan Thomas and lyrics written by Manu Manjith, whereas Krithika Nelson, Krishna Kanth, Nagarjun Sharma and Vikram Edke, wrote lyrics for the Tamil, Telugu, Kannada and Hindi versions, respectively. The album was released under the Think Music label on 26 September 2024.

== Development ==
The film is scored by Dhibu Ninan Thomas, whose involvement was confirmed with the film's announcement. Tovino in his Facebook page had announced that it would be his debut in Malayalam cinema, however, he worked on a Malayalam film Zacharia Pothen Jeevichirippundu which released back in 2017.

Dhibu started composing the songs in late 2022 and continued till 2024. He curated four original tunes for the film which varied numerous genres and utilized traditional folk and orchestral instruments. Dhibu worked with the Budapest Scoring Orchestra with Balasubramanian G conducted the 90-piece ensemble. The song "Angu Vaana Konilu" was initially intended to be recorded by Bombay Jayashri, but as Jayashri underwent diagnosis due to brain haemorrhage at that time, she could not do so. Dhibu then chose Vaikom Vijayalakshmi to perform the song.

Dhibu adapted the Bhairavan Pattu, a traditional song originally written by the Malayan community in the early 19th century. He admitted that the basis of the song developed after the script discussion with Lal and Nambiar as the film had a reference to Bharavan Thottam. The Bhairavan Pattu was sung by children in school festivals, and Dhibu watched an unplugged version of the song in Instagram. He then thought on using the song in the film, would enhance the script. Dhibu enlisted young singers from the EMS Club of Koottakani who performed for the Kerala Arts Festival, which included Adithya K. N., Sreya K. A., Greeshma K. A., Vismaya K., Arya Madhusoodhanan, Mydhili N. P., Adarsh P. A. Although they were nervous on recording for a film song, Dhibu and Lal eventually guided them throughout the process. He constructed the song entirely using humming and vocals.

== Release ==
The first single from the album, "Kiliye" was released on 2 September 2024. The song is performed by K. S. Harisankar and Anila Rajeev, in her playback singing debut. The second song "Angu Vaana Konilu" was released on 14 September, on the occasion of Onam. On 26 September, Think Music released the five-song album in music streaming platforms and as a video jukebox through YouTube.

== Critical reception ==
Janani K. of India Today wrote "Composer Dhibu Ninan Thomas's songs are soothing to the ears. In some instances, they evoke emotions directly rather than relying on the clever use of silence." Christy Rosy Sibi of The Week wrote "Throughout the film, the music director [Dhibu Ninan Thomas] perfectly encapsulated the emotions of the scene—whether it be romantic or action-filled—he delivered." Anandu Suresh of The Indian Express wrote "Dhibu Ninan Thomas' background score stands out, especially in the mass-appeal moments, though his songs are not all equally memorable."

Ajay UK of The News Minute wrote "Dhibu Ninan Thomas's music bring a visceral intensity that somewhat compensates for these deficiencies." Latha Srinivasan of Hindustan Times, while being critical of the songs, she added "Thomas' BGM however did work well in the film" Vishal Menon of The Hollywood Reporter India called it as a "thumping score plastering over these misses". Anna Mathews of The Times of India wrote "Dhibu Ninan Thomas's music amps up the mood of the story, particularly in its several exciting parts, but feels overwhelming at some points."

== Track listing ==
=== Malayalam ===
No.	Title	Lyrics	Singer(s)	Length
1.	"Kooriruttilu Kaalkulambadi"	Manu Manjith	Dhibu Ninan Thomas, Charu Hariharan	1:46
2.	"Angu Vaana Konilu"	Manu Manjith	Vaikom Vijayalakshmi	4:09
3.	"Maniya"	Manu Manjith	Aravind Srinivas, Shenbagaraj, Narayanan Ravishankar, Sarath Santhosh, Midhun Asokan	1:05
4.	"Kiliye"	Manu Manjith	K. S. Harisankar, Anila Rajeev	4:31
5.	"Bhairavan Pattu"	Malayan Community	Adithya K. N., Sreya K. A., Greeshma K. A., Vismaya K., Arya Madhusoodhanan, Mydhili N. P., Adarsh P. A., Kapil Kapilan	4:41
Total length:				16:13

=== Tamil ===
No.	Title	Lyrics	Singer(s)	Length
1.	"Kaariruttinil Oar Kolamboli"	Krithika Nelson	Deepak Blue, Charu Hariharan	1:46
2.	"Andhi Vaanil"	Krithika Nelson	Sinduri Vishal	4:09
3.	"Kaattarin Magane"	Krithika Nelson	Aravind Srinivas, Shenbagaraj, Narayanan Ravishankar, Sarath Santhosh, Midhun Asokan	1:05
4.	"Kiliye"	Krithika Nelson	Kapil Kapilan, Anila Rajeev	4:31
5.	"Bhairavan Pattu"	Malayan Community	Adithya K. N., Sreya K. A., Greeshma K. A., Vismaya K., Arya Madhusoodhanan, Mydhili N. P., Adarsh P. A., Kapil Kapilan	4:41
Total length:				16:13

=== Telugu ===
No.	Title	Lyrics	Singer(s)	Length
1.	"Chimma Cheekatlo"	Krishna Kanth	Deepak Blue, Charu Hariharan	1:46
2.	"Ambaraala Veedhilo"	Krishna Kanth	Sinduri Vishal	4:09
3.	"Kaarchichhu"	Krishna Kanth	Aravind Srinivas, Shenbagaraj, Narayanan Ravishankar, Sarath Santhosh, Midhun Asokan	1:05
4.	"Chilake"	Krishna Kanth	Kapil Kapilan, Anila Rajeev	4:31
5.	"Bhairavan Pattu"	Malayan Community	Adithya K. N., Sreya K. A., Greeshma K. A., Vismaya K., Arya Madhusoodhanan, Mydhili N. P., Adarsh P. A., Kapil Kapilan	4:41
Total length:				16:13

=== Kannada ===
No.	Title	Lyrics	Singer(s)	Length
1.	"Kadu Irulali"	Nagarjun Sharma	Deepak Blue, Charu Hariharan	1:46
2.	"Mele Neeli"	Nagarjun Sharma	Ananya Bhat	4:09
3.	"Kathhiya Hididha Katthi"	Nagarjun Sharma	Aravind Srinivas, Shenbagaraj, Narayanan Ravishankar, Sarath Santhosh, Midhun Asokan	1:05
4.	"Giniye"	Nagarjun Sharma	Kapil Kapilan, Anila Rajeev	4:31
5.	"Bhairavan Pattu"	Malayan Community	Adithya K. N., Sreya K. A., Greeshma K. A., Vismaya K., Arya Madhusoodhanan, Mydhili N. P., Adarsh P. A., Kapil Kapilan	4:41
Total length:				16:13

=== Hindi ===
No.	Title	Lyrics	Singer(s)	Length
1.	"Aag Ugi"	Vikram Edke	Deepak Blue, Charu Hariharan	1:46
2.	"Tum Ho"	Vikram Edke	Sinduri Vishal	4:09
3.	"Jangal Ka Beta"	Vikram Edke	Aravind Srinivas, Shenbagaraj, Narayanan Ravishankar, Sarath Santhosh, Midhun Asokan	1:05
4.	"Tu Hai"	Vikram Edke	Kapil Kapilan, Anila Rajeev	4:31
5.	"Bhairavan Pattu"	Malayan Community	Adithya K. N., Sreya K. A., Greeshma K. A., Vismaya K., Arya Madhusoodhanan, Mydhili N. P., Adarsh P. A., Kapil Kapilan	4:41
Total length:				16:13

== Credits ==
Credits adapted from Think Music India.

- Dhibu Ninan Thomas – composer (all tracks), producer (all tracks), piano, rhythm and electronic programming (tracks 2, 4, 5)
- Pavithra Chari – backing vocals (track 2)
- Sinduri Vishal – backing vocals (track 2)
- Aravind Srinivas – backing vocals (track 2)
- Shenbagaraj – backing vocals (track 2)
- Narayanan Ravishankar – backing vocals (track 2)
- Sarath Santosh – backing vocals (track 2)
- Gopakumar K G – rhythm programming (all tracks), percussion (track 2)
- Ashish Venkateshwaran – flute (tracks 1, 2, 5)
- Santhosh Chandran – guitar (track 2)
- Naveen Napier – bass (tracks 2, 4)
- Sruthiraj – percussion (tracks 3, 4, 5)
- Derik – percussion (track 3)
- Satheesan Velutholy – percussion (track 5)
- Praveen Kumar Cherupuzha – percussion (track 5)
- D. Balasubramaniam – Nadaswaram (track 4)
- Aattam Kalasamithi – Chenda Melam (track 4)
- Kishore – sitar (track 5)
- Budapest String Orchestra – strings (tracks 2, 4)
- Kalyani Nair – orchestra arrangement (tracks 2, 4)
- Zoltan Pad – orchestra conductor (tracks 2, 4)
- Balasubramanian G – orchestra co-ordinator (tracks 2, 4)
- Charu Hariharan – session supervisor (all tracks)
- Akshay Pradeepan – session arranger (all tracks)
- Abin Ponnachan – session arranger (all tracks)
- Vishnu MN – recording engineer (Grace Records, Chennai) [all tracks]
- KS Maniratnam – recording engineer (Mystic Room, Chennai) [tracks 2, 4]
- Viktor Sabzo – recording engineer (Rotenbiller Utica, Budapest) [tracks 2, 4]
- Aswin Kumar – recording engineer (K7 Studios, Kochi) [track 4]
- Ananth Pai – recording engineer (K7 Studios, Kochi) [track 4]
- Amal Raj – recording engineer (Audiogene Sound Studios, Kochi) [track 4]
- Kiran Lal – mixing and mastering engineer (Grace Records, Chennai) [tracks 1, 3, 5]
- Balu Thankachan – mixing engineer (20db Studios, Chennai) [tracks 2, 4]
- Shadab Rayeen – mastering engineer (New Edge Studios, Mumbai) [tracks 2, 4]
- Velavan B – music coordinator
