= Varshangalkku Shesham (soundtrack) =

Soundtrack album by Amrit Ramnath
- Released: 7 April 2024
- Recorded: 2023–2024
- Venues: Cochin; Chennai; Mumbai; Budapest
- Studios: 20db; Mystics Room; M Lounge; Sonic Island; Island City; Rottenbiller; Palindroma; ARL
- Genre: Feature film soundtrack
- Length: 42:28
- Languages: Malayalam; Tamil; Spanish
- Label: Think Music
- Producer: Amrit Ramnath

Amrit Ramnath chronology
Varshangalkku Shesham (2024)	3BHK (2025)
External audio
- Audio Jukebox on YouTube

Varshangalkku Shesham is the soundtrack to the 2024 film of the same name directed by Vineeth Sreenivasan. The film's soundtrack featured 14 songs composed by independent musician Amrit Ramnath, in his debut as a music composer. Lyrics were contributed by Ramnath's mother and singer-composer Bombay Jayashri, Manu Manjith, Vaishakh Sugunan, Sanjeeta Bhattacharya and Vineeth himself, which are mostly in Malayalam and Tamil-languages. The album was released by Think Music on 7 April 2024.

== Development ==
In July 2023, it was announced that independent musician Amrit Ramnath, son of singer-composer Bombay Jayashri, would make his feature film composition debut through Varshangalkku Shesham. Ramnath described it as a "rewarding experience" that allowed him to provide a cohesive audio-visual narrative and explore several emotional landscapes to enhance the storytelling through the film's music. He met Vineeth at his house during March 2023, who had listened to his unreleased compositions and felt that it had a specific kind of bygone era in his songs. Initially, he was interested to provide vocals for one of the songs, though Vineeth intended him to compose the film's music as he was already into composing and "his perspective would be interesting and enhance the film" as Ramnath was in his twenties.

Unlike with Vineeth's previous films, he was not a part of the music sitting and discussion with the composer Ramnath. However, Vineeth instructed Ramnath to curate songs which would have an emotional resonance with the audiences instead of songs that would be trend setting. Around the time Ramnath got the offer to compose the film, his mother suffered a brain haemorrhage, which he described as a "nightmare". He eventually went to Liverpool, England to check on his mother's health and stayed with her at the hospital. He eventually called Vineeth to tell him about the situation, but Vineeth understood and gave him the necessary space for him to work on the film. Ramnath recalled that the project helped him during the hard times, as he could channelize his emotions into the songs.

Ramnath made a mini studio in the hospital room consisting of a MIDI and microphone and a guitar he bought from a nearby garage for £40 (₹4,210.83) and composed three tracks during that period. Upon listening to the second track, Vineeth expressed his interest in having Jayashri to write the lyrics for the song, which she eventually agreed. The song eventually became "Nyabagam", which had Tamil-language lyrics and was the only song Ramnath sang; the rest of the tracks were performed by other singers.

== Marketing and release ==
Think Music acquired the rights of the film's soundtrack. In January 2024, Vineeth, Ramnath, Santhosh Kumar and Magesh Rajendran, chief executives of Think Music conducted a listening session where Ramnath's compositions for the film being played. After the session, Vineeth, Kumar and Rajendran appreciated Ramnath for his work in the film, eventually agreeing to distribute the soundtrack through their label.

Varshangalkku Shesham's soundtrack consisted of 14 songs—9 musical numbers and four instrumentals, with three based on the original songs. A music video for the song "Madhu Pakaroo" was released through YouTube on 1 March 2024 and was released as an individual single two days later. Think Music and Radio Mango 91.9 hosted an exclusive preview and listening session of the album to selected fans on 13 March 2024 at the Radio Mango FM Station in Kochi, which was followed by an interaction with Vineeth, Ramnath and Shaan Rahman.

A jukebox consisting of the earlier released single and five other songs from the album—"Varaveena", "Jeevithagaadhakale", "Sangamam", "Njaanaalunna" and "Karakaana"—was released on 17 March 2024 through YouTube. The songs were also released as singles on the same day. The six songs in the jukebox were listed on the order of the original track list in the soundtrack that released on digital platforms. On 3 April 2024, the lyrical video for the song "Pyara Mera Veera" was released with the full song being unveiled in digital platforms later. The music video for "Nyabagam" was released on 5 April 2024.

The soundtrack was further unveiled through compact discs and limited edition vinyl records from 8 April. The vinyl editions were launched by Vineeth, Ramnath, Jayashri and other cast and crew members.

== Track listing ==
The soundtrack was made available for pre-order on Apple Music on early-February 2024 which set for a streaming release on 7 April 2024.

No.	Title	Lyrics	Singer(s)	Length
1.	"Varaveena"	Appaiah Deekshitar	Kadambari Karthik, Sargam Choir	2:15
2.	"Madhu Pakaroo"	Vineeth Sreenivasan	Vineeth Sreenivasan, Amrit Ramnath, Devu Khan Manganiyar	3:54
3.	"Nyabagam"	Bombay Jayashri	Amrit Ramnath, Sindoora Jishnu	3:47
4.	"Jeevithagaadhakale"	Vaisakh Sugunan	K. S. Chithra, Sreevalsan J. Menon, Mithun Jayaraj	4:01
5.	"Sangamam"	Manu Manjith	Balram	3:08
6.	"Njaanaalunna"	Vaisakh Sugunan	Hesham Abdul Wahab	3:22
7.	"Pyara Mera Veera"	Vineeth Sreenivasan, Sanjeeta Bhattacharya	Siddharth Basrur, Sanjeeta Bhattacharya	2:39
8.	"Karakaana"	Vaisakh Sugunan	Divya Vineeth, Vineeth Sreenivasan	3:30
9.	"Varshangalkku Shesham Theme" (Instrumental)	—	Alisha Mathew Thayil, Shyam Krishna	1:45
10.	"Madhu Pakaroo" (Instrumental)	—	—	3:54
11.	"Jeevithagaadhakale" (Instrumental)	—	—	4:01
12.	"Karakaana" (Instrumental)	—	—	3:30
13.	"Thangakatti Singakutti" (Instrumental)	—	Adarsh Gopalakrishnan	0:50
14.	"Joo-Roo-Ba"	Vineeth Sreenivasan	Afsal	1:43
Total length:				42:28

== Reception ==
Critic based at The Indian Express praised Vineeth for the lyrics being "cleverly penned" on describing both women and wine in the song "Madhu Pakaroo". Several listeners felt that the song is reminiscent of "Tu Badi Masha" from the Mohanlal-starrer His Highness Abdullah (1990). Cinema Express highlighted the song "Pyara Mera Veera" has "a plenty of fourth-wall breaking elements to it" referencing Pauly's character as a star.

Vivek Santhosh of The New Indian Express wrote "Amrit Ramnath’s lovely soundtrack does not feature chartbusters in particular, but the whole soundtrack blends so well that it offers a soothing experience for most of its running time" and called "Nyabagam" as one of the highlights of the album. Cris of The News Minute wrote that the film's music "combines melody with a heavy orchestra" and Ramnath being a "wonderful discovery". Sruthi Ganapathy Raman of Film Companion South wrote "Composer Amrit Ramnath’s score is a fantastic marriage of the rush of youth and mesmerising simplicity of the past."

Anandu Suresh of The Indian Express wrote "Amrit Ramnath’s music and background score leave a strong impression overall, though they occasionally miss the mark." Deepa Soman of Manorama Online wrote "Amrit Ramnath’s songs, mixing yesteryear elements in the right proportions with contemporary music, also keep the audience interested in the proceedings." Anna Matthews of The Times of India wrote "As a film with a strong focus on music, composer Amrit Ramnath has done a solid job."
