= Lucky Baskhar (soundtrack) =

Lucky Baskhar (Original Motion Picture Soundtrack)
- Telugu version cover

Soundtrack album by G. V. Prakash Kumar
- Released: 11 November 2024
- Recorded: 2024
- Studio: Divine Labs, Chennai; Sounds Right, Chennai; Mystic Room, Chennai; Studio Vibrations, Kolkata
- Genre: Feature film soundtrack
- Length: 11:15
- Language: Telugu
- Label: Aditya Music
- Producer: G. V. Prakash Kumar

G. V. Prakash Kumar chronology
Amaran (2024)	Lucky Baskhar (Original Motion Picture Soundtrack) (2024)	Matka (2024)
External audio
- Audio Jukebox on YouTube

Singles from Lucky Baskhar (Original Motion Picture Soundtrack)
- 1. "Srimathi Garu" Released: 19 June 2024; 2. "Lucky Baskhar Title Track" Released: 28 July 2024; 3. "Nijamaa Kalaa" Released: 6 November 2024

Lucky Baskhar (Original Motion Picture Soundtrack) is the soundtrack album to the 2024 Telugu-language period crime drama film of the same name directed by Venky Atluri and produced by Suryadevara Naga Vamsi and Sai Soujanya under Sithara Entertainments, Srikara Studios and Fortune Four Cinemas, starring Dulquer Salmaan and Meenakshi Chaudhary. The album featured three songs composed by G. V. Prakash Kumar with lyrics written by Sri Mani and Ramajogayya Sastry. The album was released under the Aditya Music label on 11 November 2024.

== Background ==
Lucky Baskhar is Prakash's maiden collaboration with Salmaan; sophomore with Atluri after the bilingual Vaathi / Sir (2023). The film's music consisted of three songs which are montage numbers, that enhanced the flow of the narrative. Prakash recorded the film's music during early 2024, while simultaneously working on multiple projects.

== Composition ==
Prakash composed three songs for the film. The first song "Srimathi Garu" (in Telugu), as "Kolladhey" (in Tamil), "Mindathe" (in Malayalam), "Naarazgi" (in Hindi) and "Shrimati Avre" (in Kannada) is a romantic number picturized on Baskhar (Salmaan) and Sumathi (Chaudhary) and their life as a married couple. It is sung by Vishal Mishra and Shweta Mohan; the latter's vocals were retained for the three versions, except the Kannada version which was sung by Amala Chebolu and Mishra's was retained for the Hindi version, whereas Anand Aravindakshan, Yazin Nizar and Krishna Tejasvi recorded the vocals for the Tamil, Malayalam and Kannada versions.

The second song is the titular track is sung by Usha Uthup, who recorded the vocals for the Tamil, Malayalam and Hindi versions, while the Kannada version is sung by Sravana Bhargavi. The song is an upbeat vintage number which showcases Baskhar's life as a middle-class banker. The third song "Nijamaa Kalaa" (in Telugu), "Vidhi Maarudha" (in Tamil), "Mizhideepame" (in Malayalam), "Nijavaa Idoo" (in Kannada) and "Duniya Meri" (in Hindi) is a montage number, picturized on Baskhar's reconciliation with his family. The song is recorded by Krishna Tejasvi in Telugu, Tamil, Kannada and Hindi, while the Malayalam version was sung by Aswin Sathya.

== Release ==
In June 2024, Prakash through his X (formerly Twitter) account stated that he had handed over the master audio of the film's first single to the producers, which approved its release. The promo of the first single "Srimathi Garu" was released on the occasion of Eid al-Adha (17 June) and the full song was released on 19 June. The title track was released as the second single from the album on 28 July, coinciding Salmaan's birthday. The third song "Nijamaa Kalaa" was released on 6 November, after the film's release. The soundtrack album was released on 11 November.

== Reception ==
Reviewing "Srimathi Garu", a critic from Cinema Express called it as "a sweet yet rousing romantic number, with great blend of old-school symphonic sound and contemporary beats". Manoj Kumar R. of Desimartini described the song as a "soulful romantic melody". Trisha Bhattacharya of India Today, while reviewing the title track, described it as "a nostalgic throwback, blending classic beats with contemporary flair." Akhila Menon of OTTPlay added that the song "brings the perfect retro mood to the fun number" complimenting Uthup's vocals.

Divya Nair of Rediff.com described the music "scintillating". Paul Nicodemus of The Times of India wrote "While the songs may lack recall value after leaving the cinema, GV Prakash Kumar's background score significantly enhances the narrative." "GV Prakash Kumar's music creates a great sense of thrill and tension". Balakrishna Ganeshan of The News Minute wrote "Music composer GV Prakash is another asset to the film. His music adds the necessary suspense and ably helps with the proceedings." Avinash Ramachandran of The Indian Express wrote "Venky and GV Prakash combo create magic once again with Lucky Baskhar".

== Track listing ==
=== Telugu ===
Lucky Baskhar (Original Motion Picture Soundtrack) Telugu version track listing
No.	Title	Lyrics	Artist(s)	Length
1.	"Srimathi Garu"	Sri Mani	Vishal Mishra, Shweta Mohan	3:42
2.	"Lucky Baskhar Title Track"	Ramajogayya Sastry	Usha Uthup	3:45
3.	"Nijamaa Kalaa"	Sri Mani	Krishna Tejasvi	3:47
Total length:				11:15

=== Tamil ===
Lucky Baskhar (Original Motion Picture Soundtrack) Tamil version track listing
No.	Title	Lyrics	Artist(s)	Length
1.	"Kolladhey"	Vignesh Ramakrishna	Anand Aravindakshan, Shweta Mohan	3:42
2.	"Lucky Baskhar Title Track"	Balaji Venugopal, Vanamali	Usha Uthup	3:45
3.	"Vidhi Maarudha"	Balaji Venugopal	Krishna Tejasvi	3:47
Total length:				11:15

=== Malayalam ===
Lucky Baskhar (Original Motion Picture Soundtrack) Malayalam version track listing
No.	Title	Lyrics	Artist(s)	Length
1.	"Mindathe"	Vaisakh Sugunan	Yazin Nizar, Shweta Mohan	3:42
2.	"Lucky Baskhar Title Track"	Vinayak Sasikumar	Usha Uthup	3:45
3.	"Mizhideepame"	Arun Alat	Aswin Sathya	3:47
Total length:				11:15

=== Kannada ===
All lyrics are written by Sujatha Dutt.

Lucky Baskhar (Original Motion Picture Soundtrack) Kannada version track listing
No.	Title	Artist(s)	Length
1.	"Shrimati Avre"	Krishna Tejasvi, Amala Chebolu	3:42
2.	"Lucky Baskhar Title Track"	Sravana Bhargavi	3:44
3.	"Nijavaa Idoo"	Krishna Tejasvi	3:47
Total length:			11:14

=== Hindi ===
Lucky Baskhar (Original Motion Picture Soundtrack) Hindi version track listing
No.	Title	Lyrics	Artist(s)	Length
1.	"Naaraazgi"	Manoj Muntashir	Vishal Mishra, Shweta Mohan	3:42
2.	"Lucky Baskhar Title Track"	Manoj Muntashir	Usha Uthup	3:45
3.	"Duniya Meri"	S. S. Yusufzai	Krishna Tejasvi	3:47
Total length:				11:15

== Album credits ==
Credits adapted from Aditya Music.

- G. V. Prakash Kumar – composer (all tracks), producer (all tracks), musical arrangements (all tracks)
- Raj Kumar Amal – music programmer (tracks 1, 3)
- Urban Thozha – music programmer (track 2)
- Sriradha Bharath – backing vocals (track 2)
- Aishwarya Anil Kumar – backing vocals (track 2)
- Padmaja Sreenivasan – backing vocals (track 2)
- Kamalaja Rajagopal – backing vocals (track 2)
- Lalit Talluri – flute (tracks: 1, 3)
- Chennai Strings Orchestra – strings (track 1)
- Balaji – orchestra conductor (track 1)
- Artem K. – trumpet (track 2), saxophone (track 2), trombone (track 2)
- Joel Jebnesan Jacob – electric guitar (track 2)
- Varun Murali – electric guitar (track 2)
- Sai Rakshit – violin (track 3)
- KS Maniratnam – recording engineer (Mystic Room, Chennai) [track 1]
- Vishnu MN – recording engineer (Mystic Room, Chennai) [track 1]
- Aswin George John – recording engineer (Sounds Right Studio, Chennai) [track 2]
- Gowtam Basu – recording engineer (Studio Vibrations, Kolkata) [track 2]
- Jehovahson Alghar – mixing and mastering engineer (Divine Labs, Chennai) [all tracks]
- Roopash Tiwari – assistant sound engineer (Divine Labs, Chennai) [all tracks]
- Rajamurugan – studio assistance
