= Malaikottai Vaaliban (soundtrack) =

Soundtrack album by Prashant Pillai
- Released: 18 January 2024
- Recorded: December 2022–November 2023
- Studio: Aries Vismayas Max, Kochi; Ferris Wheel Studios, Gurugram; Gray Spark Audio, Pune; VTP Studios, Kochi
- Genre: Feature film soundtrack
- Length: 28:47
- Language: Malayalam; Hindi
- Label: Saregama
- Producer: Prashant Pillai

Prashant Pillai chronology
Djinn (2023)	Malaikottai Vaaliban (2024)

Malaikottai Vaaliban is the soundtrack to the 2024 Malayalam-language film of the same name directed by Lijo Jose Pellissery and stars Mohanlal. A joint production of John & Mary Creative, Century Films, Maxlab Cinemas and Entertainments, Yoodlee Films and Amen Movie Monastery, the film's musical score and soundtrack were composed by Prashant Pillai and lyrics written by P. S. Rafeeque, Preeti Pillai and Varun Grover. The soundtrack was released by Saregama on 18 January 2024.

== Background ==
Pellissery's norm collaborator Prashant Pillai—who had worked on all of the director's films, excluding Churuli (2022) (Note: composed by Sreerag Saji (score only)) and Nanpakal Nerathu Mayakkam (2023) (Note: The film did not feature the use of background music and mostly consisted natural sounds)—had scored music for Malaikottai Vaaliban; it is also Pillai's maiden collaboration with Mohanlal. The film features eight songs in both Malayalam and Hindi-languages. Screenwriter P. S. Rafeeque contributed for the lyrics in the Malayalam-language, while the Hindi lyrics were written by Preeti Pillai and Varun Grover. Besides composing, Pillai arranged and programmed the songs. The initial compositions for four of the tracks—"Punnara Kattile Poovanatthil", "Raakk", "Thaayum", and "Ezhimala Kottayile"—were composed by Rafeeque and later directed by Pillai.

Pillai produced most of the songs in Canada, while the recording happened mostly in India across Kochi, Gurgaon and Pune. In a Facebook post, he revealed that it took him nearly a year to score music for the film, throughout December 2022–November 2023.

== Marketing and release ==
Malaikottai Vaaliban's soundtrack preceded with four singles. The first of them—the instrumental theme used in the film teaser—was released as a single on 7 December 2023. The second song "Punnara Kattile Poovanatthil", a romantic number, was released on 15 December, with a music video accompanying the track. The third song "Raakk" was released on 22 December, with a lyrical video also released on the same date as the single. The video featured snippets of a group of travellers carousing in a rest house with Mohanlal (who also sang the track). The fourth song "Madabhara Mizhiyoram" was released on 8 January 2024.

The film's soundtrack was released digitally on 18 January 2024 through the Saregama label, whereas it was physically launched a day later, at an event held in Kochi with the presence of the film's cast and crew.

== Track listing ==
No.	Title	Lyrics	Music	Singer(s)	Length
1.	"Malaikottai Vaaliban Teaser Theme"		Prashant Pillai		1:00
2.	"Punnara Kattile Poovanatthil"	P. S. Rafeeque	Prashant Pillai, P. S. Rafeeque	Shreekumar Vakkiyil, Abhaya Hiranmayi	3:10
3.	"Raakk"	P. S. Rafeeque	Prashant Pillai, P. S. Rafeeque	Mohanlal	2:50
4.	"Madabhara Mizhiyoram"	P. S. Rafeeque	Prashant Pillai	Preeti Pillai	3:02
5.	"Thaayum"	P. S. Rafeeque	Prashant Pillai, P. S. Rafeeque	Palakkad Sreeram	4:58
6.	"Ezhimala Kottayile"	P. S. Rafeeque	Prashant Pillai, P. S. Rafeeque	Preeti Pillai	4:46
7.	"Madabhare Naina" (Female)	Preeti Pillai	Prashant Pillai	Preeti Pillai	2:59
8.	"Madabhare Naina" (Male)	Preeti Pillai	Prashant Pillai	Suresh Wadkar	2:59
9.	"Shabnami"	Varun Grover	Prashant Pillai	Sherrin Varghese, Mano, Prashant Pillai	3:00

== Reception ==
Princy Alexander of Manorama Online wrote Prashant Pillai's music is "perfectly blend in with the mood of the narrative". Latha Srinivasan of Hindustan Times complimented Pillai for the "rich cultural elements" in the music production and instrumentation. S. R. Praveen of The Hindu described the music as "catchy" and "immense repeat value". Janani K. of India Today wrote that Pillai's music "elevates the sequences and gives the much-needed hype in many important sequences". Hari P. N. of Koimoi said the music "ignites the film's narrative" and "harmonizes with the story’s mood effortlessly", but was also critical on its lack of impact needed to "forge a profound emotional connection with the characters or the narrative". Nirmal Jovial of The Week praised the background score being "outstanding in places" but criticized the songs as they were "not memorable" and "irrelevant". Anandu Suresh of The Indian Express wrote Pillai's music sets the "perfect tone" and evokes the "atmosphere of spaghetti Western films".
