= Vaikom Vijayalakshmi =

Indian playback singer

Vijayalakshmi
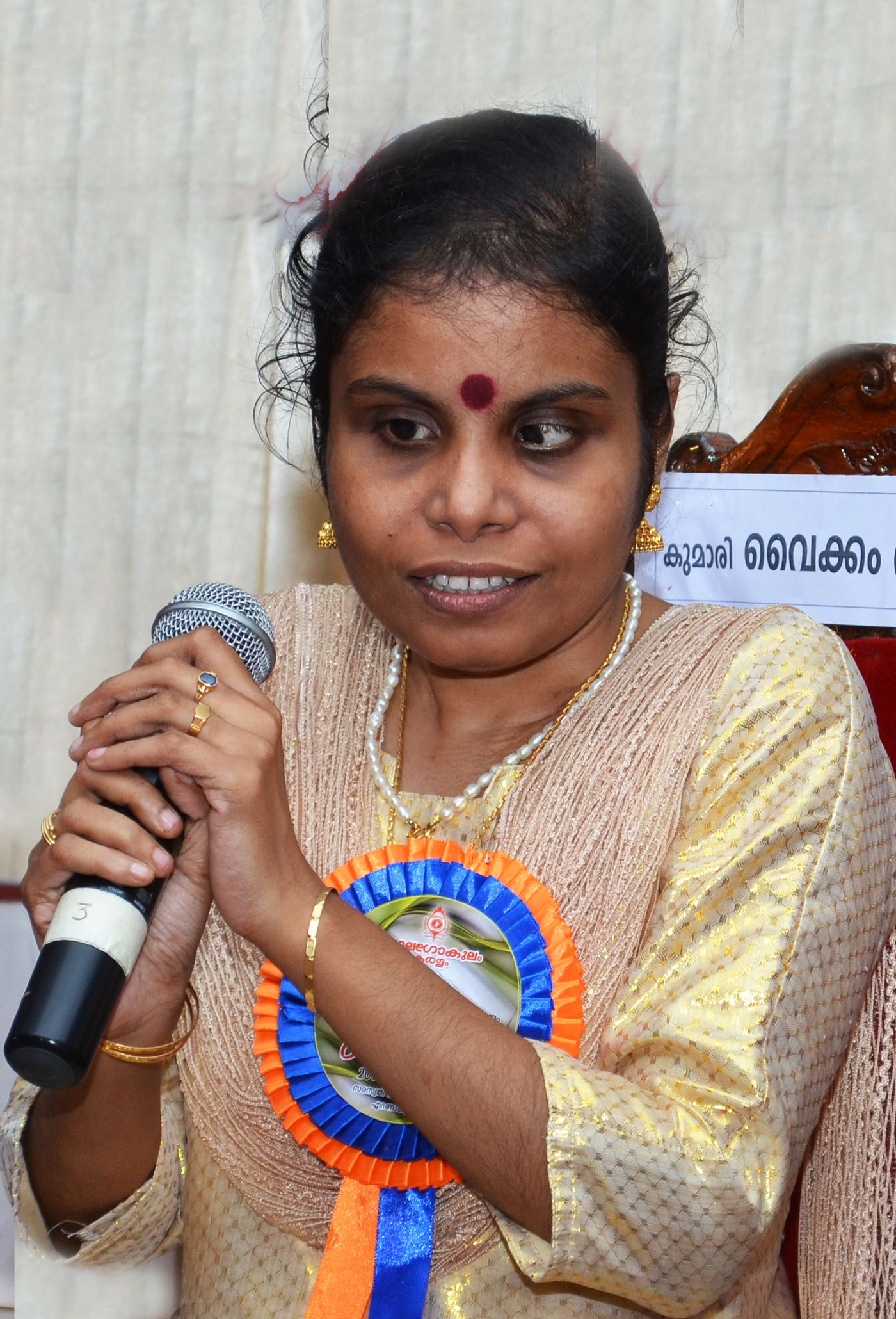

Background information
- Born: Vijayalakshmi Muraleedharan; 7 October 1981 (age 45); Vaikom, Kottayam, Kerala, India
- Genres: Playback singing, Carnatic music
- Instruments: Vocals, Gayatriveena
- Years active: 1995 – present
- Spouse: N. Anoop (m. 2018; div. 2021)

Vaikom Vijayalakshmi (born 7 October 1981) is an Indian playback singer from Kerala, India. She is an expert in a rare musical instrument called Gayatriveena. She won special jury mention for her much appreciated work in the 2013 film Celluloid. She was born at Vaikom on 7 October 1981 and later on moved to Chennai. In 2022, she was honoured with Kerala Sree Award, third highest civilian award given by the Government of Kerala. She is a recipient of several accolades including a National Film Award, two Kerala State Film Award and a Filmfare Award. She was also a recipient of Kerala Sangeetha Nataka Akademi Award for Light music in 2013

== Personal life ==
She was born on 7 October 1981, on Vijayadashami. She got engaged to Bahrain-based technician Santhosh in December 2016, but she suddenly called off her wedding, citing that her fiancé insulted her for her blindness and requested her to stop stage shows. She was praised for her decision on social media. Vaikom Vijayalakshmi married N. Anoop, a mimicry artist on 22 October 2018 at Vaikom Sree Mahadeva Temple. They got divorced in June 2021.

== Awards ==
- 2012: Kerala State Film Award – Special Mention for "Kaatte Kaatte" from Celluloid
- 2013: Kerala State Film Award for Best Singer for "Ottakku Padunna" from Nadan
- 2013: Kerala Sangeetha Nataka Akademi Award (Light Music)
- 2014: Filmfare Award for Best Female Playback Singer – Malayalam for "Ottakku Padunna" from Nadan
- 2014: Mirchi Music Awards (South) for Upcoming Female Vocalist of the year for "Ottakku Padunna" from Nadan
- 2014: Nominated – Asianet Film Awards for Best Playback Singer(Female) – "Ottakku Padunna" from Nadan
- 2014: Jaycey Film Awards for Best Singer for "Ottakku Padunna" from Nadan
- 2014: Nominated – 3rd South Indian International Movie Awards for Best Female Playback Singer – "Ottakku Padunna" from Nadan
- 2014: Eenam Swaralaya Awards for song of the year – "Ottakku Padunna" from Nadan
- 2014: Nominated – Asiavision Awards for Best Singer(Female)-"Ottakku Padunna" from Nadan
- 2014: Nominated – Vijay Award for Best Singer(Female)-"Puthiya Uligai" from Yennamo Yedho
- 2014: C.K.M.A Malayalam film Awards for Best female singer
- 2015: Nominated – Filmfare Award for Best Female Playback Singer – Malayalam for "Kaikkottum" from Oru Vadakkan Selfie
- 2016: Won – Vanitha Film Award for Best Singer(Female)- "Kaikottum" from "Oru Vadakkan Selfie"
- 2017: Honorary doctorate (D.Litt) from International Tamil University United States
- 2022: Kerala Sree award instituted by Government of Kerala
- 2024: National Film Awards 2024 - Best Playback Singer (Female) award for "Angu Vaana Konile" from ARM.

== Filmography ==
- 2022 – Swami Saranam
- 2014 – Ezhudesangalkkumakale
