= J Baby =

- Theatrical release poster
- Directed by: Suresh Mari
- Written by: Suresh Mari
- Produced by: Pa. Ranjith; Abhayanand Singh; Piiyush Singh; Sourabh Gupta; Aditi Anand; Ashwini Chaudhari
- Starring: Attakathi Dinesh; Urvashi; Lollu Sabha Maaran
- Cinematography: Jayanth Sethu Mathavan
- Edited by: Shanmugam Velusamy
- Music by: Tony Britto
- Production companies: Vistas Media; Neelam Productions; Neelam Studios
- Distributed by: Sakthi Film Factory
- Release date: 8 March 2024
- Country: India
- Language: Tamil

J Baby (stylised as J.Baby) is a 2024 Indian-Tamil family drama directed by Suresh Mari and produced by Pa Ranjith. . It stars Dinesh, Urvashi in titular role and Lollu Sabha Maaran. The film is inspired by a true story from 2013 and centers around themes of motherhood, mental health, family conflict and reconciliation.

== Plot ==
The story revolves around a woman named, J. Baby, an aging mother and her two sons, Shankar and Senthil. Both sons have grown apart due to misunderstandings, contrasting personalities and unresolved issues from their past. While Shankar is a serious, dutiful man burdened by responsibilities, Senthil is more carefree and emotionally disconnected.

One day, the family receives shocking news that J Baby is found in Kolkata, far from their home in Tamil Nadu, under mysterious circumstances. The police inform the brothers and urge them to come and take her back. Confused and anxious, the estranged brothers reluctantly come together to retrieve their mother.

What begins as a journey to bring their mother home becomes a deeper journey of rediscovery—of their childhood, their emotional scars, and the unspoken pain that distanced them from each other and from their mother.

As they travel, flashbacks slowly reveal how J Baby's mental health had been deteriorating for years, unnoticed and ignored. Her emotional suppression, sacrifices and longing for affection from her children surface gradually. The sons start realizing the extent of their emotional neglect towards their mother. Through these moments, it witnesses the personal struggles of Shankar and Senthil, shaped by a childhood filled with misunderstandings, pressure, and lack of communication.

Finally, in Kolkata they finally find their mother in a disoriented state. Their encounter is emotional, confusing, and painful—but also transformative. Seeing their mother's fragile condition helps the brothers break their emotional walls and rebuild their relationship.

They return home together, not just physically reunited but emotionally reconnected. The film displays the importance of mental well-being, empathy in family dynamics, and the unconditional love of a mother that often goes unacknowledged until it is almost too late.

== Cast ==
- Dinesh as J Shankar, Baby's youngest son
- Urvashi as J Baby
- Lollu Sabha Maaran as J Senthil, Baby's eldest son
- Kavitha Bharathy as Lender
- Jaya Murthy as himself
- Shegar Narayanan as J Shakti, Baby's younger son
- P. Melody Dorcas as Baby's younger daughter
- Ismath Banu A. as Shankar's wife
- Sabbita Roi as Baby's Eldest Daughter
- Mayaashree Arun
- Pari Elavazhagan
- Gaayathri Krishnan as Pooja, a Mental asylum patient

== Soundtrack ==
The music was composed by Tony Britto.

Tracklist
No.	Title	Lyrics	Singer(s)	Length
1.	"Nedumaram"	Uma Devi	Pradeep Kumar, Annie J	4:00
2.	"Idha Thane Ethir Paathen"	Vivek	Shweta Mohan	3:46
3.	"Little Bit Crazy"	Roshan Jamrock	Roshan Jamrock	2:47
4.	"Yaar Padalai"	Vivek	K. S. Chithra	6:20
5.	"Idha Thane" (Reprise)	Vivek	Anand Aravindakshan	3:50
Total length:				20:43

== Reception ==
The Times of India gave the film two stars out of five in a very mixed review. Cinema Express's assessment was slightly more positive, stating in particular that "Urvashi saves an otherwise overly melodramatic film". Other reviews also praised the performance of the actress, Onmanorama in particular wrote, "J Baby stands out in comparison to Priyadarshan's 2023 film Appatha, where Urvashi also portrayed a mother".
