= Blink (2024 Indian film) =

2024 Kannada film directed by Srinidhi Bengaluru

- Theatrical release poster
- Directed by: Srinidhi Bengaluru
- Screenplay by: Srinidhi Bengaluru
- Story by: Srinidhi Bengaluru
- Produced by: Ravichandra AJ
- Starring: Dheekshith Shetty; Chaithra J Achar; Gopalkrishna Deshpande; Mandara Battalahalli
- Cinematography: Avinaasha Shastry
- Edited by: Sanjeev Jagirdar
- Music by: Prasanna Kumar MS
- Production company: Janani Pictures
- Distributed by: Janani Pictures
- Release date: 8 March 2024
- Running time: 136 minutes
- Country: India
- Language: Kannada

Blink is a 2024 Indian Kannada-language science fiction thriller film produced by Ravichandra A J under Janani pictures and written and directed by debutant Srinidhi Bengaluru. The film stars Dheekshith Shetty and Chaithra J Achar in lead roles. The soundtrack and background score were composed by Prasanna Kumar MS, while the cinematography handled by Avinaasha Shastry and editing done by Sanjeev Jagirdar.

Blink was released on 8 March 2024 to positive reviews from critics, who praised the direction, editing, music and acting.

== Plot ==
Apoorva, a 24-year-old in Bengaluru, conceals his failed MA from his mother. Juggling part-time jobs, he relies on his love interest, Swapna, for support. Apurva's unique ability to control blinking becomes a curse when a mysterious old man reveals his father's survival.

== Cast ==
- Dheekshith Shetty as Apoorva
  - Suresh Anagali as Old Arivu, Muduka
  - Vajradheer Jain as Arivu
- Mandara Battalahalli as Swapna
- Chaithra J Achar as Devaki
- Gopalkrishna Deshpande as Gopal Krishna
- Soumyasree Marnad as Yashoda
- Kiran Naik as Kallaih
- Yashaswini Rao
- Murali Sringeri
- Bharath K Tumkuru
- Tejesh SM
- Nagaraj Rao
- Hulikal Nataraj as himself, cameo appearance
- Vishal Jaivik as Suresh

== Music ==
Blink

Soundtrack album by Prasanna Kumar M S
- Released: 2023, 2024
- Recorded: 2024
- Genre: Feature film soundtrack
- Length: 23:52
- Label: Janani Pictures
- Producer: Prasanna Kumar MS

Prasanna Kumar MS composed the film's background music and soundtrack.

Track listing
No.	Title	Lyrics	Artist(s)	Length
1.	"Aaganthuka"	Srinidhi Bengaluru	Anup K R, Kaumudhi Chandrashekar	3:15
2.	"Sakhi"	Pramod Maravanthe	Siddhartha Belmannu	4:39
3.	"Kannalli Nooru"	Deepa Baraati	Sunidhi Ganesh	3:36
4.	"Sariva Samaya"	Jayanth Kaikini	Pancham Jeeva	3:45
5.	"Ayomaya"	Jayanth Kumar	Pancham Jeeva	2:35
6.	"Kauthuka"	Trilok Trivikram	Kaumudhi Chandrashekhar	3:04
7.	"Aadi Ba - DJ Mix"	Folk	Girija Siddhi, Kalyan Manjunath	2:58
Total length:				23:52

== Release ==
=== Theatrical ===
Blink was theatrically released in India on 8 March 2024, coinciding with Maha Shivaratri, in limited screens across Karnataka but were increased over time owing to good word-of-mouth reviews from the audience. The film was also released overseas in the following days by Sandalwood Talkies. The film competed 50 days across Karnataka.

=== Home media ===
The film became available for digital streaming in US and UK on Amazon Prime Video on 9 May 2024. In India it started streaming from 14 May 2024. The dubbed versions of Telugu, Malayalam, Tamil, Hindi and Bengali were released on the same platform. It was dubbed in 17 worldwide languages and released on Aha later.

== Reception ==
In his review for The Hindu, Vivek M.V. applauded Blink by debut director Srinidhi Bengaluru, highlighting the time-travel drama and performances by Dheekshith Shetty, Gopalkrishna Deshpande and Chaithra J Achar. She praised the film's fusion of technical elements and its ability to hold audience attention throughout its runtime with enough twists. She found Blink to be a genre-specific film that required strong attention and investment to fully appreciate its complexities. Pranati AS, of Deccan Herald, bestowed 'Blink' with a commendable 4 out of 5 rating. In her review, she eloquently described the film as more than just a commercial endeavor, highlighting its exceptional writing and the seamless integration of time-travel narrative with music, poetry, and theatre."

In her review for Cinema Express, A Sharadhaa praised the movie as a sci-fi thriller that weaved together the complexities of time travel. She praised Bengaluru's vision for challenging cinematic norms and pushing boundaries. She gave the film a rating of 3.5 out of 5 stars. Shashiprasad S M of Times Now in his review described "Blink provides a unique experience of time travel, showcasing a different cinematic world, appreciated for its efforts by the reviewer. The film intricately weaves through various timelines, keeping the audience hooked with its blend of fiction and intense drama. Performances by the cast, especially Deekshit Shetty, contribute to the thrilling journey, making Blink a captivating watch and with 3.5 out of 5 rating.

Sridevi S, in her review for The Times of India, rated Blink with 3/5 stars. She found it was an experimental venture in Sandalwood, delving into the realm of sci-fi with emotional depth. She praised Bengaluru's skillful storytelling and the ensemble cast's performances. Prathibha Joy of OTTPlay in her review wrote "Dheekshith Shetty’s sci-fi flick is a bold and engaging take on Oedipus".
