= 13th South Indian International Movie Awards =

2025 award ceremony in Dubai

- Awarded for: Excellence in South Indian cinema
- Date: 5–6 September 2025
- Site: Dubai Exhibition Centre, Dubai, United Arab Emirates
- Hosted by: Govind Padmasoorya; Rishi; Roopa Koduvayur; Sathish; Shubra Aiyappa; Sudigali Sudheer
- Organized by: Vibri Media Group

Highlights
- Best Film: Telugu – Kalki 2898 AD; Tamil – Amaran; Malayalam – Manjummel Boys; Kannada – Krishnam Pranaya Sakhi
- Most awards: Amaran (7)
- Most nominations: Amaran (13)

Television coverage
- Channel: Gemini TV (Telugu); Sun TV (Tamil); Surya TV (Malayalam); Udaya TV (Kannada)
- Network: Sun TV Network

The 13th South Indian International Movie Awards is an awards event that took place at the Dubai Exhibition Centre in Dubai, United Arab Emirates, on 5–6 September 2025. The ceremony (13th SIIMA) recognized and honored the best films and performances from Telugu, Tamil, Malayalam and Kannada films released in 2024, along with special honours for lifetime contributions and a few special awards. The nominations were announced in late-July 2025.

The first day of the ceremony (5 September 2025) awarded the best films and performances from the Telugu and Kannada cinema, whereas on the second day (6 September 2025), best films and performances from the Tamil and Malayalam cinema were awarded. Roopa Koduvayur and Sudigali Sudheer have hosted the Telugu cinema segment. Sathish had co-hosted the Tamil segment. Govind Padmasoorya had co-hosted the Malayalam cinema segment. Rishi and Shubra Aiyappa have hosted the Kannada cinema segment.

Amaran is the most awarded film with seven awards followed by Pushpa 2: The Rule with five, Kalki 2898 AD, Lubber Pandhu and Max with four. Pushpa 2: The Rule is the most awarded Telugu film followed by Kalki 2898 AD. Amaran is the most awarded Tamil film followed by Lubber Pandhu. Aadujeevitham, ARM, Marco, and Premalu are the most awarded Malayalam films with three awards each. Max is the most awarded Kannada film followed by Bheema and Krishnam Pranaya Sakhi.

== Main awards and nominees ==
=== Film ===
Best Film
Telugu	Tamil
Kalki 2898 AD – Vyjayanthi Movies; Devara: Part 1 – Yuvasudha Arts, N. T. R. Arts; Hanu-Man – Primeshow Entertainment; Lucky Baskhar – Sithara Entertainments; Pushpa 2: The Rule – Mythri Movie Makers	Amaran – Raaj Kamal Films International, Sony Pictures Films India; Lubber Pandhu – Prince Pictures; Maharaja – The Route, Think Studios, Passion Studios; Meiyazhagan – 2D Entertainment; Viduthalai Part 2 – RS Infotainment, Grass Root Film Company
Kannada	Malayalam
Krishnam Pranaya Sakhi – Trishul Entertainments; Bagheera – Hombale Films; Bhairathi Ranagal – Geetha Pictures; Bheema – Krishna Creations, Jagadeesh Films; Max – V Creations, Kichcha Creations; UI – Lahari Films, Venus Entertainers	Manjummel Boys – Parava Films; Aadujeevitham – Visual Romance; Aattam – Joy Movie Productions; Aavesham – Anwar Rasheed Entertainments, Fahadh Faasil and Friends; Bramayugam – Night Shift Studios, YNOT Studios; Kishkindha Kaandam – Goodwill Entertainments
Best Director
Telugu	Tamil
Sukumar – Pushpa 2: The Rule; Koratala Siva – Devara: Part 1; Nag Ashwin – Kalki 2898 AD; Prasanth Varma – Hanu-Man; Venky Atluri – Lucky Baskhar	Rajkumar Periasamy – Amaran; C. Prem Kumar – Meiyazhagan; Mari Selvaraj – Vaazhai; Nithilan Saminathan – Maharaja; Pa. Ranjith – Thangalaan; Vetrimaaran – Viduthalai Part 2
Kannada	Malayalam
Upendra – UI; Dr. Suri – Bagheera; Duniya Vijay – Bheema; Narthan – Bhairathi Ranagal; Srinivas Raju – Krishnam Pranaya Sakhi; Vijay Karthikeyaa – Max	Blessy – Aadujeevitham; Chidambaram – Manjummel Boys; Rahul Sadasivan – Bramayugam; Girish A. D. – Premalu; Jithu Madhavan – Aavesham; Dinjith Ayyathan – Kishkindha Kaandam
Best Cinematographer
Telugu	Tamil
R. Rathnavelu – Devara: Part 1; Daniel Viswas, Sateesh Reddy Masam – KA; Dasaradhi Shivendra – Hanu-Man; Djordje Stojiljkovic – Kalki 2898 AD; Mirosław Kuba Brożek – Pushpa 2: The Rule	CH Sai – Amaran; Dinesh Purushothaman – Maharaja; Manoj Paramahamsa – Minmini; R. Velraj – Viduthalai Part 2; Theni Eswar – Vaazhai
Kannada	Malayalam
Srivathsan Selvarajan – Ibbani Tabbida Ileyali; Adarsha R – Murphy; Arjun Shetty – Bagheera; Naveen Kumar – Bhairathi Ranagal; Vishwajith Rao – Shakhahaari	Shehnad Jalal – Bramayugam; Bahul Ramesh – Kishkindha Kaandam; Jomon T. John – ARM; Shyju Khalid – Manjummel Boys; Sunil K. S. – Aadujeevitham

=== Acting ===
Best Actor
Telugu	Tamil
Allu Arjun – Pushpa 2: The Rule; Dulquer Salmaan – Lucky Baskhar; N. T. Rama Rao Jr. – Devara: Part 1; Nani – Saripodhaa Sanivaaram; Prabhas – Kalki 2898 AD; Teja Sajja – Hanu-Man	Sivakarthikeyan – Amaran; Dhanush – Raayan; Harish Kalyan – Lubber Pandhu; Karthi – Meiyazhagan; Vijay Sethupathi – Maharaja; Vikram – Thangalaan
Kannada	Malayalam
Sudeepa – Max (Note: Received by V. Nagendra Prasad); Duniya Vijay – Bheema; Ganesh – Krishnam Pranaya Sakhi; Rangayana Raghu – Shakhahaari; Shiva Rajkumar – Bhairathi Ranagal; Sriimurali – Bagheera	Prithviraj Sukumaran – Aadujeevitham; Asif Ali – Kishkindha Kaandam; Fahadh Faasil – Aavesham; Mammootty – Bramayugam; Tovino Thomas – ARM; Unni Mukundan – Marco
Best Actress
Telugu	Tamil
Rashmika Mandanna – Pushpa 2: The Rule; Anupama Parameswaran – Tillu Square; Ashika Ranganath – Naa Saami Ranga; Deepika Padukone – Kalki 2898 AD; Meenakshi Chaudhary – Lucky Baskhar; Nivetha Thomas – 35 Chinna Katha Kaadu	Sai Pallavi – Amaran; Dushara Vijayan – Raayan; Keerthy Suresh – Raghu Thatha; Manju Warrier – Viduthalai Part 2; Parvathy Thiruvothu – Thangalaan; Urvashi – J Baby
Kannada	Malayalam
Ashika Ranganath – O2; Chaithra J Achar – Blink; Rachita Ram – Matinee; Roshni Prakash – Murphy; Rukmini Vasanth – Bhairathi Ranagal; Sharanya Shetty – Krishnam Pranaya Sakhi	Urvashi – Ullozhukku; Jyothirmayi – Bougainvillea; Mamitha Baiju – Premalu; Nazriya Nazim – Sookshmadarshini; Parvathy Thiruvothu – Ullozhukku; Zarin Shihab – Aattam
Best Actor in a Supporting Role
Telugu	Tamil
Amitabh Bachchan – Kalki 2898 AD (Note: Received by Anna Ben); Allari Naresh – Naa Saami Ranga; Muralidhar Goud – Tillu Square; Ramki – Lucky Baskhar; P. Sai Kumar – Saripodhaa Sanivaaram	Kalaiyarasan – Vaazhai; Kalidas Jayaram – Raayan; Lal – Star; M. S. Bhaskar – Raghu Thatha; Shiva Rajkumar – Captain Miller
Kannada	Malayalam
Cockroach Sudhi – Bheema; Achyuth Kumar – Yuva; Gopalkrishna Deshpande – Shakhahaari; Raj B. Shetty – Roopanthara; Ugramm Manju – Max	Vijayaraghavan – Kishkindha Kaandam; Arjun Ashokan – Bramayugam; Sangeeth Prathap – Premalu; Bobby Kurian – Pani; Dileesh Pothan – Golam
Best Actress in a Supporting Role
Telugu	Tamil
Anna Ben – Kalki 2898 AD; Pavani Karanam – Pushpa 2: The Rule; Ramya Krishna – Guntur Kaaram; Sharanya Pradeep – Ambajipeta Marriage Band; Varalaxmi Sarathkumar – Hanu-Man	Abhirami – Maharaja; Nikhila Vimal – Vaazhai; Swasika – Lubber Pandhu; Geetha Kailasam – Amaran; Nivedhithaa Sathish – Captain Miller
Kannada	Malayalam
Hitha Chandrashekar – Yuva; Ila Veermalla – Murphy; Mandara Battalahalli – Blink; Niviksha Naidu – Lineman; Priya Shatamarshan – Bheema	Akhila Bhargavan – Premalu; Grace Antony – Nunakkuzhi; Maala Parvathi – Mura; Seema – Pani; Surabhi Lakshmi – ARM
Best Actor in a Negative Role
Telugu	Tamil
Kamal Haasan – Kalki 2898 AD; Ajay – Pottel; Fahadh Faasil – Pushpa 2: The Rule; S. J. Suryah – Saripodhaa Sanivaaram; Vinay Rai – Hanu-Man	Anurag Kashyap – Maharaja (Note: Received by Nithilan Saminathan); Chetan – Viduthalai Part 2; Rana Daggubati – Vettaiyan; S. J. Suryah – Raayan; Sujith Shankar – Rasavathi
Kannada	Malayalam
Prabhu Mundkur – Maryade Prashne; Dragon Manju – Bheema; P. Ravi Shankar – Upadhyaksha; Ramachandra Raju – Bagheera; Suresh Anagali – Blink	Jagadish – Marco; Anurag Kashyap – Rifle Club; Raj B. Shetty – Turbo; Sagar Surya – Pani; Suraj Venjaramoodu – Mura
Best Comedian
Telugu	Tamil
Satya – Mathu Vadalara 2 (Note: Received by Faria Abdullah); Brahmanandam – Kalki 2898 AD; Getup Srinu – Hanu-Man; Praneeth Reddy Kallem – Tillu Square; Prasad Behara – Committee Kurrollu	Bala Saravanan – Lubber Pandhu; Anandaraj – Vithaikkaaran; Devadarshini – Raghu Thatha; Redin Kingsley – Bloody Beggar; Yogi Babu – Aranmanai 4
Kannada	Malayalam
Jack Singham – Bheema; Rangayana Raghu – Krishnam Pranaya Sakhi; Sadhu Kokila – Upadhyaksha; Tukali Santosh – Moorane Krishnappa; Vaijanath Biradar – Karataka Damanaka	Shyam Mohan – Premalu; Joemon Jyothir – Guruvayoor Ambalanadayil; Sajin Gopu – Aavesham; Baiju Santhosh – Nunakkuzhi; Aju Varghese – Gaganachari

=== Debut ===
Best Debut Actor
Telugu	Tamil
Sandeep Saroj – Committee Kurrollu; Akash Goparaju – Sarkaaru Noukari; Ankith Koyya – Maruthi Nagar Subramanyam; Chandra Hass – Ramnagar Bunny; Deepak Saroj – Siddharth Roy; Yuva Chandraa – Pottel	Vijay Kanishka – Hit List; Dhirav – Veppam Kulir Mazhai; Pari Elavazhagan – Jama; Ponvel M. – Vaazhai; Praveen Kishore – Minmini
Kannada	Malayalam
Samarjit Lankesh – Gowri; Bhagat Alva – Hejjaru; Chikkanna – Upadhyaksha; Pradeep Doddaiah – Out of Syllabus; Sampath Maitreya – Moorane Krishnappa; Yuva Rajkumar – Yuva	K. R. Gokul – Aadujeevitham; Abhimanyu Shammy Thilakan – Marco; Hanumankind – Rifle Club; Hipzter – Aavesham; Hridhu Haroon – Mura
Best Debut Actress
Telugu	Tamil
Bhagyashri Borse – Mr. Bachchan; Janhvi Kapoor – Devara: Part 1; Manushi Chhillar – Operation Valentine; Nayan Sarika – Aay; Pankhuri Gidwani – Love Mouli	Sri Gouri Priya – Lover; Mamitha Baiju – Rebel; Anna Ben – Kottukkaali; Preity Mukhundhan – Star; Sanjana Krishnamoorthy – Lubber Pandhu
Kannada	Malayalam
Ankita Amar – Ibbani Tabbida Ileyali; Malaika Vasupal – Upadhyaksha; Mallika Singh – Ondu Sarala Prema Kathe; Saanya Iyer – Gowri; Sherlyn Bhosale – Hadinelentu; Spandana Somanna – Dil Kush; Swathishta Krishnan – Ondu Sarala Prema Kathe	Neha Nazneen – Qalb; Abhaya Hiranmayi – Pani; Krithi Shetty – ARM; Methil Devika – Kadha Innuvare; Yukti Thareja – Marco
Best Debut Director
Telugu	Tamil
Nanda Kishore Emani – 35 Chinna Katha Kaadu; Anji K. Maniputhra – Aay; Sujith and Sandeep – KA; Vijay Binni – Naa Saami Ranga; Yadhu Vamsi – Committee Kurrollu; Yata Satyanarayana – Razakar	Tamizharasan Pachamuthu – Lubber Pandhu; Prabhuram Vyas – Lover; Nikesh RS – Rebel; S. Jayakumar – Blue Star; Suman Kumar – Raghu Thatha
Kannada	Malayalam
Sandeep Sunkad – Shakhahaari; Chandrajith Belliappa – Ibbani Tabbida Ileyali; Mithilesh Edavalath – Roopanthara; Nagaraj Somayaji – Maryade Prashne; Srinidhi Bengaluru – Blink	Joju George – Pani; Anand Ekarshi – Aattam; Christo Tomy – Ullozhukku; Jithin Laal – ARM; Payal Kapadia – All We Imagine as Light
Best Debut Producer
Telugu	Tamil
Niharika Konidela (Pink Elephant Pictures) – Committee Kurrollu; Bobby Tikka, Srinivas Rao Takkalapelly (Aurum Arts) – Satyabhama; Gudur Narayana Reddy (Samarveer Creation LLP) – Razakar; Thabitha Bandreddi (PBR Cinemas, Lokamaatre Cinematics) – Maruthi Nagar Subramanyam; Venkata Raji Reddy (Comrade Film Factory, Atheera Productions) – Kismat	Divya Mari Selvaraj, Mari Selvaraj (Navvi Studios) – Vaazhai; Era. Saravanan (Era Entertainment) – Nandhan; G. Soundarya, R. Ganesh Murthy (Lemon Leaf Creation) – Blue Star; Hiphop Tamizha (Hiphop Tamizha Entertainment) – Kadaisi Ulaga Por; Nelson Dilipkumar (Filament Pictures) – Bloody Beggar
Kannada	Malayalam
Ravichandra AJ (Janani Pictures) – Blink; Chandrajith Belliappa – Ibbani Tabbida Ileyali; Fakeerappa Bandiwada (Masari Talkies) – Photo; Mysore Ramesh (Ram Movies) – Ondu Sarala Prema Kathe; Parth Jani, Suhan Prasad (Jani Entertainment, Mango Pickle Entertainment) – Roopanthara; Rajesh Keelambi, Ranjini Prasanna (Keelambi Media Lab) – Shakhahaari; Shwetha R Prasad, Vidya Gandhi Rajan (Sakkath Studio) – Maryade Prashne	Shareef Muhammed (Cubes Entertainments) – Marco; Babu Shahir, Shawn Antony, Soubin Shahir (Parava Films) – Manjummel Boys; Blessy (Visual Romance) – Aadujeevitham; Chakravarthy Ramachandra (Night Shit Studios) – Bramayugam; Shibu Baby John (John & Mary Creative) – Malaikottai Vaaliban

=== Music ===
Best Music Director
Telugu	Tamil
Devi Sri Prasad – Pushpa 2: The Rule; Anirudh Ravichander – Devara: Part 1; Gowra Hari – Hanu-Man; G. V. Prakash Kumar – Lucky Baskhar; Santhosh Narayanan – Kalki 2898 AD; Thaman S – Guntur Kaaram	G. V. Prakash Kumar – Amaran; Anirudh Ravichander – Vettaiyan; A. R. Rahman – Raayan; Khatija Rahman – Minmini; Sean Roldan – Lubber Pandhu
Kannada	Malayalam
B. Ajaneesh Loknath – Max; Arjun Janya – Krishnam Pranaya Sakhi; Charan Raj – Bheema; Gagan Baderia – Ibbani Tabbida Ileyali; V. Harikrishna – Karataka Damanaka	Dhibu Ninan Thomas – ARM; A. R. Rahman – Aadujeevitham; Christo Xavier – Bramayugam; Vishnu Vijay – Premalu; Sushin Shyam – Aavesham
Best Lyricist
Telugu	Tamil
Ramajogayya Sastry – "Chuttamalle" from Devara: Part 1; Anantha Sriram – "Kalyani Vaccha Vacchaa" from The Family Star; Chandrabose – "Sooseki" from Pushpa 2: The Rule; Kasarla Shyam – "Poolamme Pilla" from Hanu-Man; Sri Mani – "Nijame Ne Chebutunna" from Ooru Peru Bhairavakona	Uma Devi – "Poraen Naa Poraen" from Meiyazhagan; Arivu – "Hunter Vantaar" from Vettaiyan; Karthik Netha – "Hey Minnale" from Amaran; Mohan Rajan – "Thaensudare" from Lover; Yugabharathi – "Vennilavu Saaral" from Amaran
Kannada	Malayalam
V. Nagendra Prasad – "Dwapara" from Krishnam Pranaya Sakhi; A. P. Arjun – "Jeevan Neene" from Martin; Chandrajith Belliappa – "Oh Anahita" from Ibbani Tabbida Ileyali; Pramod Maravanthe – "Parichayavade" from Bagheera; Sachin Sanghe – "Gunu Gunugu" from Ondu Sarala Prema Kathe	Suhail Koya – "Telangana Bommalu" from Premalu; Vinayak Sasikumar – "Illuminati" from Aavesham; Manu Manjith – "Angu Vaana Konilu" from ARM; Rafeeq Ahamed – "Periyone" from Aadujeevitham; Anwar Ali – "Nebulakal" from Manjummel Boys
Best Male Playback Singer
Telugu	Tamil
Shankarr Babu Kandukoori – "Peelings" from Pushpa 2: The Rule; Gowra Hari – "Poolamme Pilla" from Hanu-Man; Kaala Bhairava – "Ayudha Pooja" from Devara: Part 1; Karthik – "Kalyani Vaccha Vacchaa" from The Family Star; Ram Miriyala – "Ticket Eh Konakunda" from Tillu Square	Haricharan – "Hey Minnale" from Amaran; Kapil Kapilan – "Vennilavu Saaral" from Amaran; Pradeep Kumar – "Chillanjirukkiye" from Lubber Pandhu; Sean Roldan – "Thaensudare" from Lover; Siddharth Basrur – "Hunter Vantaar" from Vettaiyan
Kannada	Malayalam
Jaskaran Singh – "Dwapara" from Krishnam Pranaya Sakhi; Kapil Kapilan – "Oh Anahita" from Ibbani Tabbida Ileyali; Malu Nipanal – "Hithalaka Karibyada Maava" from Karataka Damanaka; MC Bijju, Rahul Dito – "Bad Boys" from Bheema; Ritesh G Rao – "Parichayavade" from Bagheera	K. S. Harisankar – "Kiliye" from ARM; K. G. Markose – "Telangana Bommalu" from Premalu; Dabzee – "Illuminati" from Aavesham; Jithin Raj – "Periyone" from Aadujeevitham; Vedan – "Kuthanthram" from Manjummel Boys
Best Female Playback Singer
Telugu	Tamil
Shilpa Rao – "Chuttamalle" from Devara: Part 1; Ramya Behara – "Hey Rangule" from Amaran; Sahithi Chaganti – "Kurchi Madathapetti" from Guntur Kaaram; Shreya Ghoshal – "Sooseki" from Pushpa 2: The Rule; Shweta Mohan – "Srimathi Garu" from Lucky Baskhar	Sinduri Vishal – "Minikki Minikki" from Thangalaan; Dhee – "Thenkizhakku" from Vaazhai; Rakshita Suresh – "Vennilavu Saaral" from Amaran; Shakthisree Gopalan – "Thaensudare" from Lover; Shweta Mohan – "Hey Minnale" from Amaran
Kannada	Malayalam
Aishwarya Rangarajan – "Hot'tu Mamma" from Max; Prithwi Bhat – "Kaadadeye Hegirali" from Krishnam Pranaya Sakhi; Shruthi Prahalad – "Hithalaka Karibyada Maava" from Karataka Damanaka; Shruthika Samudhrala – "Jeevan Neene" from Martin; Srilakshmi Belmannu – "Radhe" from Ibbani Tabbida Ileyali	Vaikom Vijayalakshmi – "Angu Vaana Konilu" from ARM (Note: Received by Dhibu Ninan Thomas); Ahi Ajayan – "Dhurooha Manthahasame" from Sookshmadarshini; Chinmayi Sripada – "Omane" from Aadujeevitham; Mary Ann Alexander – "Sthuthi" from Bougainvillea; Sithara – "Oru Chillu Paathram" from Vivekanandan Viralanu

== Critics choice awards ==
Telugu cinema

- Best Actor – Teja Sajja – Hanu-Man
- Best Actress – Meenakshi Chaudhary – Lucky Baskhar
- Best Director – Prasanth Varma – Hanu-Man

Tamil cinema

- Best Actor – Karthi – Meiyazhagan
- Best Actress – Dushara Vijayan – Raayan
- Best Director – Nithilan Saminathan – Maharaja

Kannada cinema

- Best Actor – Duniya Vijay – Bheema
- Best Actress – Roshni Prakash – Murphy
- Best Director – Vijay Karthikeyaa – Max

Malayalam cinema

- Best Actor – Unni Mukundan – Marco
- Best Actress – Parvathy Thiruvothu – Ullozhukku

== Special awards ==
- Promising Actress (Kannada) – Saanya Iyer – Gowri
- Song Design of the Year – Imran Sardhariya
- 50 years in Telugu cinema – C. Aswini Dutt
- Special award – V. Harikrishna
- 25 years in South Indian cinema – Trisha Krishnan
- Rising Star (Tamil) – Harish Kalyan – Lubber Pandhu
- The Exemplary Lifetime Achievement Award – Sivakumar
- Fresh Face (Tamil) – Sanjana Krishnamoorthy – Lubber Pandhu
- Youth Icon of South Indian cinema – Sivakarthikeyan
- Best Entertainment Film of the Year - Pushpa 2: The Rule

== Superlatives ==
Films with multiple nominations
Nominations	Film
13	Amaran
11	Pushpa 2: The Rule
10	Aadujeevitham
10	Hanu-Man
10	Kalki 2898 AD
9	ARM
9	Bheema
9	Hanu-Man
9	Krishnam Pranaya Sakhi
8	Aavesham
8	Devara: Part 1
8	Lubber Pandhu
8	Premalu
7	Bramayugam
7	Ibbani Tabbida Ileyali
7	Lucky Baskhar
7	Vaazhai
6	Bagheera
6	Maharaja
6	Manjummel Boys
6	Max
5	Blink
5	Bhairathi Ranagal
5	Kishkindha Kaandam
5	Lover
5	Marco
5	Pani
5	Raayan
5	Shakhahaari
5	Viduthalai Part 2
4	Committee Kurrollu
4	Karataka Damanaka
4	Meiyazhagan
4	Ondu Sarala Prema Kathe
4	Raghu Thatha
4	Thangalaan
4	Tillu Square
4	Upadhyaksha
3	Guntur Kaaram
3	Maryade Prashne
3	Minmini
3	Murphy
3	Naa Saami Ranga
3	Roopanthara
3	Saripodhaa Sanivaaram
3	Ullozhukku
3	Vettaiyan
3	Yuva
2	35 Chinna Katha Kaadu
2	Aattam
2	Aay
2	Bloody Beggar
2	Blue Star
2	Gowri
2	KA
2	Maruthi Nagar Subramanyam
2	Moorane Krishnappa
2	Mura
2	Nunakkuzhi
2	Pottel
2	Razakar
2	Rebel
2	Rifle Club
2	Star
2	Sookshmadarshini
2	UI

Films with multiple awards
Awards	Film
7	Amaran
5	Pushpa 2: The Rule
4	Kalki 2898 AD
4	Lubber Pandhu (Note: Including two non-competitive awards (Rising Star (Tamil) and Fresh Face (Tamil)))
4	Max (Note: Including a non-competitive award (SIIMA Critics Award for Best Director – Kannada))
3	Aadujeevitham
3	ARM
3	Bheema (Note: Including a non-competitive award (SIIMA Critics Award for Best Actor – Kannada))
3	Devara: Part 1
3	Krishnam Pranaya Sakhi
3	Maharaja (Note: Including a non-competitive award (SIIMA Critics Award for Best Director – Tamil))
3	Marco (Note: Including a non-competitive award (SIIMA Critics Award for Best Actor – Malayalam))
3	Premalu
2	Committee Kurrollu
2	Gowri (Note: Including a non-competitive award (Promising Actress (Kannada)))
2	Hanu-Man (Note: Including two non-competitive awards (SIIMA Critics Award for Best Actor – Telugu and SIIMA Critics Award for Best Director – Telugu))
2	Ibbani Tabbida Ileyali
2	Meiyazhagan (Note: Including a non-competitive award (SIIMA Critics Award for Best Actor – Tamil))
2	Ullozhukku (Note: Including a non-competitive award (SIIMA Critics Award for Best Actress – Malayalam))
2	Vaazhai

== Presenters and performers ==
Performer	Work
Athulya Ravi	Dance
Shilpa Rao	Singing
Shriya Saran	Dance
Shruti Haasan	Dance
Tanishk Bagchi	Singing
