= SIIMA Award for Best Male Debut – Kannada =

Kannada film male debut award

- Awarded for: Best Debut Performance by an Actor in a Leading Role in Kannada cinema
- Country: India
- Presented by: Vibri Media Group
- First award: 21 June 2012 (for films released in 2011)
- Most recent winner: Kireeti Reddy, Junior (2025)

SIIMA Award for Best Male Debut – Kannada is presented by Vibri media group as part of its annual South Indian International Movie Awards, for the best acting done by a male actor in a leading role in his debut Kannada film. The award was first given in 2012 for films released in 2011.

== Superlatives ==
Categories	Recipient	Notes
Oldest winner	Nagabhushana	Age 35
Youngest winner	Dhruva Sarja	Age 24

- Dhananjaya is the only actor to have also won the SIIMA Award for Best Actor – Kannada.

== Winners and nominees ==
Year	Actor	Film	Ref.
2011 (1st)	Srikanth	Olave Mandara	
2012 (2nd)
2012 (2nd)	Dhruva Sarja	Addhuri	
2012 (2nd)	Sharan	Rambo	
2012 (2nd)	Surya	Crazy Loka	
2012 (2nd)	Nithin	Hosa Prema Purana	
2012 (2nd)	Gurunandan	Cyber Yugadol Nava Yuva Madhura Prema Kavyam	
2013 (3rd)
2013 (3rd)	Dhananjaya	Director's Special	
2013 (3rd)	Krishna	Madarangi	
2013 (3rd)	Niranjan Shetty	Case No. 18/9	
2013 (3rd)	Shankar Aryan	Chitramandiradalli	
2013 (3rd)	Arun	Gombegala Love	
2014 (4th)
2014 (4th)	Bharath Sarja	Veera Pulikeshi	
2014 (4th)	Pawan Wadeyar	Preeti Geeti Ityadi	
2014 (4th)	Pradeep	Rangan Style	
2014 (4th)	Vivek	Endendu Ninagagi	
2014 (4th)	Kiran Rao	Savaari 2	
2015 (5th)
2015 (5th)	Vinay Rajkumar	Siddhartha	
2015 (5th)	Mahesh	Namak Haraam	
2015 (5th)	Nirup Bhandari	Rangi Taranga	
2015 (5th)	Prathap Narayan	Benkipatna	
2015 (5th)	Santhosh Reva	Kendasampige	
2016 (6th)
2016 (6th)	Nikhil Kumaraswamy	Jaguar	
2016 (6th)	Anoop Revanna	Lakshmana	
2016 (6th)	Roger Narayan	U Turn	
2016 (6th)	Dilip Prakash	Crazy Boy	
2016 (6th)	Sachin	Happy Birthday	
2017 (7th)
2017 (7th)	Rishi	Operation Alamelamma	
2017 (7th)	Ishaan	Rogue	
2017 (7th)	Manoranjan	Saheba	
2017 (7th)	Mithra	Raaga	
2017 (7th)	Raj B. Shetty	Ondu Motteya Kathe	
2018 (8th)
2018 (8th)	Danish Sait	Humble Politician Nograj	
2018 (8th)	Naveen Shankar	Gultoo	
2018 (8th)	Niranjan Sudhindra	Second Half	
2018 (8th)	Prakyath Paramesh	Naduve Antharavirali	
2018 (8th)	Vaibhav	Tharakaasura	
2019 (9th)
2019 (9th)	Abhishek Ambareesh	Amar	
2019 (9th)	Dhanveer	Bazaar	
2019 (9th)	Viraat	Kiss	
2019 (9th)	Bhuvann Ponnannaa	Randhawa	
2019 (9th)	Shreyas Manju	Padde Huli	
2020 (9th)
2020 (9th)	Pruthvi Ambaar	Dia	
2020 (9th)	Aravinnd Iyer	Bheemasena Nalamaharaja	
2020 (9th)	Manju Mandavya	Sri Bharatha Baahubali	
2020 (9th)	Pramod Shetty	Ondu Shikariya Kathe	
2020 (9th)	Prabhu Surya	Gadinadu	
2021 (10th)
2021 (10th)	Nagabhushana	Ikkat	
2021 (10th)	Govinde Gowda	Akshi	
2021 (10th)	Aryan Gowda	Vikky	
2021 (10th)	Madan Kumar	Janumada Jatre'	
2022 (11th)
2022 (11th)	Pruthvi Shamanur	Padavi Poorva	
2022 (11th)	Dheeren Ramkumar	Shiva 143	
2022 (11th)	Karthik Mahesh	Dollu	
2022 (11th)	Vikram Ravichandran	Trivikrama	
2022 (11th)	Madhusudhan Govind	Made in Bengaluru	
2022 (11th)	Zaid Khan	Banaras	
2023 (12th)	Shishir Baikady	Daredevil Musthafa	
2023 (12th)	Prajwal B. P.	Hostel Hudugaru Bekagiddare	
2023 (12th)	Praveer Shetty	Siren	
2023 (12th)	Rajesh Dhruva	Sri Balaji Photo Studio	
2023 (12th)	Sriyaan Mysuru	Bembidada Navika	
2024 (13th)	Samarjit Lankesh	Gowri	
2024 (13th)	Bhagat Alva	Hejjaru	
2024 (13th)	Chikkanna	Upadhyaksha	
2024 (13th)	Pradeep Doddaiah	Out of Syllabus	
2024 (13th)	Sampath Maitreya	Moorane Krishnappa	
2024 (13th)	Yuva Rajkumar	Yuva	
2025 (14th)	Kireeti Reddy	Junior	
2025 (14th)	Maahir Mohiuddin	Vritta	
2025 (14th)	SS Dushyanth	Gatha Vaibhava	
2025 (14th)	Shaneel Gautham	Su From So	
2025 (14th)	Sumukha	Manada Kadalu	
2025 (14th)	Vamshi Krishna Srinivas	Firefly	

== See also ==
- SIIMA Award for Best Actor – Kannada
