= SIIMA Award for Best Actor – Kannada =

Kannada-language media award

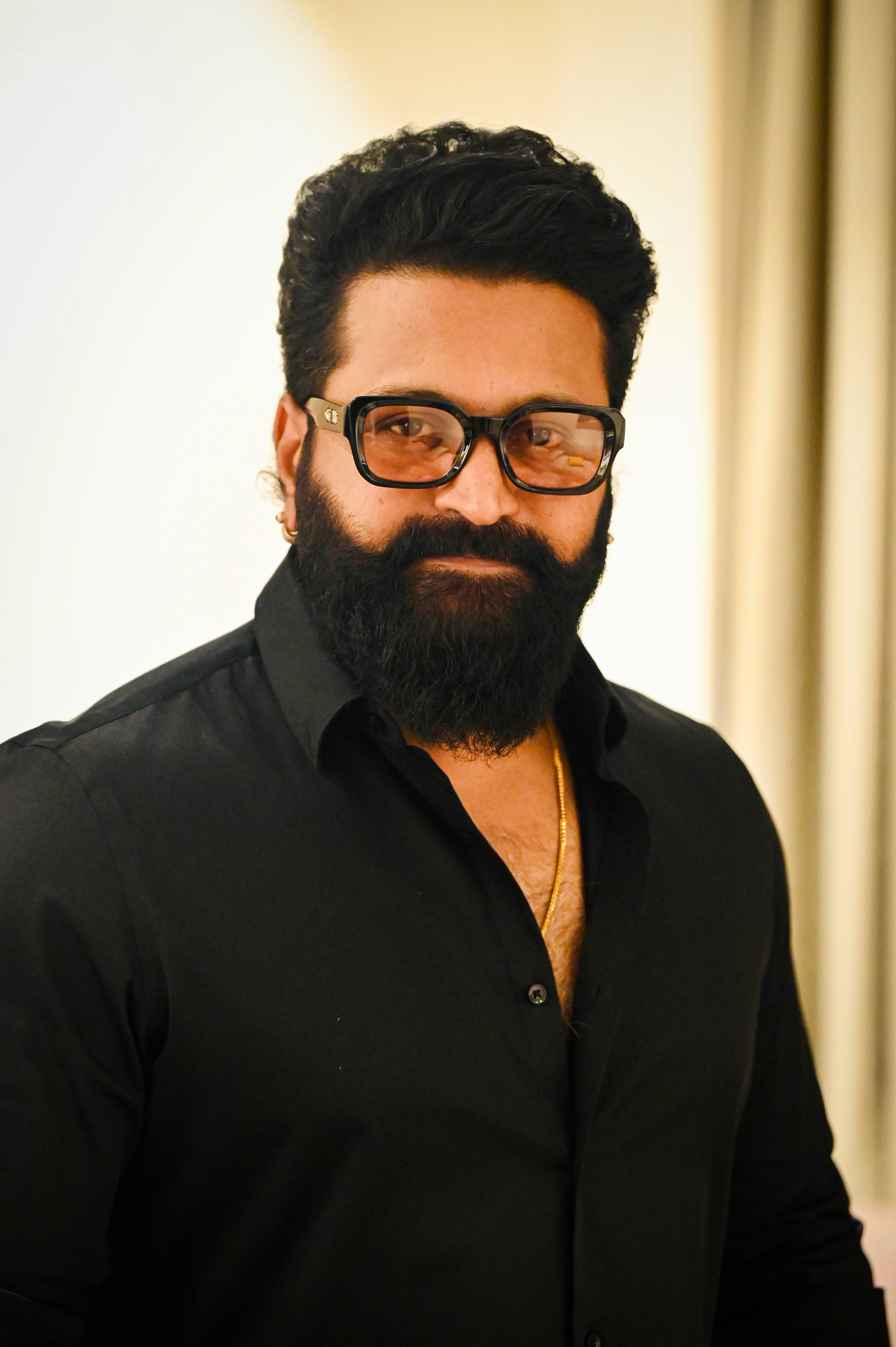
- The 2026 recipient: Rishab Shetty
- Awarded for: Best Performance by an Actor in a Leading Role in Kannada cinema
- Country: India
- Presented by: Vibri Media Group
- First award: 21 June 2012 (for films released in 2011)
- Most recent winner: Rishab Shetty, Kantara: Chapter 1 (2025)

Highlights
- Most wins: Puneeth Rajkumar (4)
- Most nominations: Shiva Rajkumar (10)

SIIMA Award for Best Actor – Kannada is presented by Vibri media group as part of its annual South Indian International Movie Awards, for best acting done by an actor in Kannada films. The award was first given in 2012 for films released in 2011.

== Superlatives ==
Categories	Recipient	Notes
Most wins	Puneeth Rajkumar	4
Most nominations	Shiva Rajkumar	10
Oldest winner	Shiva Rajkumar	Age 50
Youngest winner	Yash	Age 28

- Rakshit Shetty, Rishab Shetty and Yash have also won the SIIMA Critics Award for Best Actor – Kannada. Yash had also won the award in the same year for the same film, KGF: Chapter 1.

== Winners ==
Year	Actor	Film	Ref.
2011	Puneeth Rajkumar	Hudugaru	
2012	Shiva Rajkumar	Shiva	
2013	Shiva Rajkumar	Bhajarangi	
2014	Yash	Mr. and Mrs. Ramachari	
2015	Puneeth Rajkumar	Rana Vikrama	
2016	Shiva Rajkumar	Shivalinga	
2017	Puneeth Rajkumar	Raajakumara	
2018	Yash	KGF: Chapter 1	
2019	Darshan	Yajamana	
2020	Dhananjaya	Popcorn Monkey Tiger	
2021	Puneeth Rajkumar (Note: Awarded posthumously)	Yuvarathnaa	
2022	Yash	KGF: Chapter 2	
2023	Rakshit Shetty	Sapta Saagaradaache Ello: Side A	
2024	Sudeepa	Max	
2025	Rishab Shetty	Kantara: Chapter 1	

== Nominations ==
- 2011: Puneeth Rajkumar – Hudugaru
- 2012: Shiva Rajkumar – Shiva
  - Upendra – Katariveera Surasundarangi
  - Darshan – Krantiveera Sangolli Rayanna
  - Puneeth Rajkumar – Anna Bond
  - Duniya Vijay – Bheema Theeradalli
- 2013: Shiva Rajkumar – Bhajarangi
  - Sudeep – Bachchan
  - Upendra – Topiwala
  - Darshan – Bulbul
  - Yash – Googly
- 2014: Yash – Mr. and Mrs. Ramachari
  - Dhruva Sarja – Bahaddur
  - Upendra – Brahma
  - Sathish Ninasam – Love in Mandya
  - Sriimurali – Ugramm
- 2015: Puneeth Rajkumar – Rana Vikrama
  - Ajay Rao – Krishna Leela
  - Sathish Ninasam – Rocket
  - Upendra – Uppi 2
  - Yash – Masterpiece
- 2016: Shiva Rajkumar – Shivalinga
  - Jaggesh – Neer Dose
  - Puneeth Rajkumar – Doddmane Hudga
  - Rakshit Shetty – Kirik Party
  - Yash – Santhu Straight Forward
- 2017: Puneeth Rajkumar – Raajakumara
  - Dhruva Sarja – Bharjari
  - Ganesh – Chamak
  - Shiva Rajkumar – Mufti
  - Sriimurali – Mufti
- 2018: Yash – KGF: Chapter 1
  - Ananth Nag – Sarkari Hi. Pra. Shaale, Kasaragodu, Koduge: Ramanna Rai
  - Sathish Ninasam – Ayogya
  - Sharan – Raambo 2
  - Shiva Rajkumar – Tagaru
- 2019: Darshan – Yajamana
  - Puneeth Rajkumar – Natasaarvabhowma
  - Rakshit Shetty – Avane Srimannarayana
  - Sriimurali – Bharaate
  - Rishi – Kavaludaari
- 2020: Dhananjaya – Popcorn Monkey Tiger
  - Prajwal Devaraj – Gentleman
  - Danish Sait – French Biriyani
  - Darling Krishna – Love Mocktail
  - Raj B. Shetty – Mayabazar 2016
- 2021: Puneeth Rajkumar – Yuvarathnaa
  - Darshan – Roberrt
  - Rishab Shetty – Garuda Gamana Vrishabha Vahana
  - Dhananjaya – Badava Rascal
  - Shiva Rajkumar – Bhajarangi 2
  - Ganesh – Sakath
- 2022: Yash – KGF: Chapter 2
  - Puneeth Rajkumar – James
  - Rakshit Shetty – 777 Charlie
  - Rishab Shetty – Kantara
  - Shiva Rajkumar – Vedha
  - Sudeepa – Vikrant Rona
- 2023: Rakshit Shetty – Sapta Saagaradaache Ello: Side A
  - Darshan – Kaatera
  - Dhananjaya – Gurudev Hoysala
  - Raj B. Shetty – Toby
  - Ramesh Aravind – Shivaji Surathkal 2
  - Shiva Rajkumar – Ghost
- 2024: Sudeepa – Max
  - Duniya Vijay – Bheema
  - Ganesh – Krishnam Pranaya Sakhi
  - Rangayana Raghu – Shakhahaari
  - Shiva Rajkumar – Bhairathi Ranagal
  - Sriimurali – Bagheera
- 2025: Rishab Shetty – Kantara: Chapter 1
  - Diganth Manchale – Edagaiye Apaghatakke Karana
  - Sharan – Choo Mantar
  - Shiva Rajkumar – 45
  - Sudeepa – Mark
  - Vinod Prabhakar – Maadeva

== See also ==
- SIIMA Critics Award for Best Actor – Kannada
