= SIIMA Critics Award for Best Actor – Kannada =

Kannada-language media award

- Awarded for: Best Performance by an Actor in a Leading Role in Telugu cinema
- Country: India
- Presented by: Vibri Media Group
- First award: 21 June 2012 (for films released in 2011)
- Most recent winner: Vinod Prabhakar, Maadeva (2025)

Highlights
- Most wins: Upendra (4)

SIIMA Critics Award for Best Actor – Kannada is presented by Vibri media group as part of its annual South Indian International Movie Awards, for best acting done by an actor in Kannada films, who are selected by the jury. The award was first given in 2012 for films released in 2011.

== Superlatives ==
| Categories | Recipient | Notes |
|---|---|---|
| Most wins | Upendra | 4 |
| Oldest winner | Upendra | Age 45 |
| Youngest winner | Sathish Ninasam | Age 30 |

- Upendra has maximum awards with four wins, followed by Rakshit Shetty with two wins.
- Rakshit Shetty, Rishab Shetty and Yash have also won the SIIMA Award for Best Actor – Kannada. Yash won the award in the same year for the same film, K.G.F Chapter – 1.

== Winners ==
| Year | Actor | Film | Ref. |
|---|---|---|---|
| 2011 | Upendra | Shrimathi | |
| 2012 | Upendra | Katariveera Surasundarangi | |
| 2013 | Upendra | Topiwala | |
| 2014 | Upendra | Super Ranga | |
| 2015 | Sathish Ninasam | Rocket | |
| 2016 | Rakshit Shetty | Kirik Party | |
| 2017 | Sriimurali | Mufti | |
| 2018 | Yash | KGF: Chapter 1 | |
| 2019 | Rakshit Shetty | Avane Srimannarayana | |
| 2020 | Prajwal Devaraj | Gentleman | |
| 2021 | No Award | | |
| 2022 | Rishab Shetty | Kantara | |
| 2023 | Dhananjaya | Gurudev Hoysala | |
| 2024 | Duniya Vijay | Bheema | |
| 2025 | Vinod Prabhakar | Maadeva | |

== See also ==
- SIIMA Award for Best Actor – Kannada
