= SIIMA Critics Award for Best Actor – Malayalam =

Malayalam-language media award

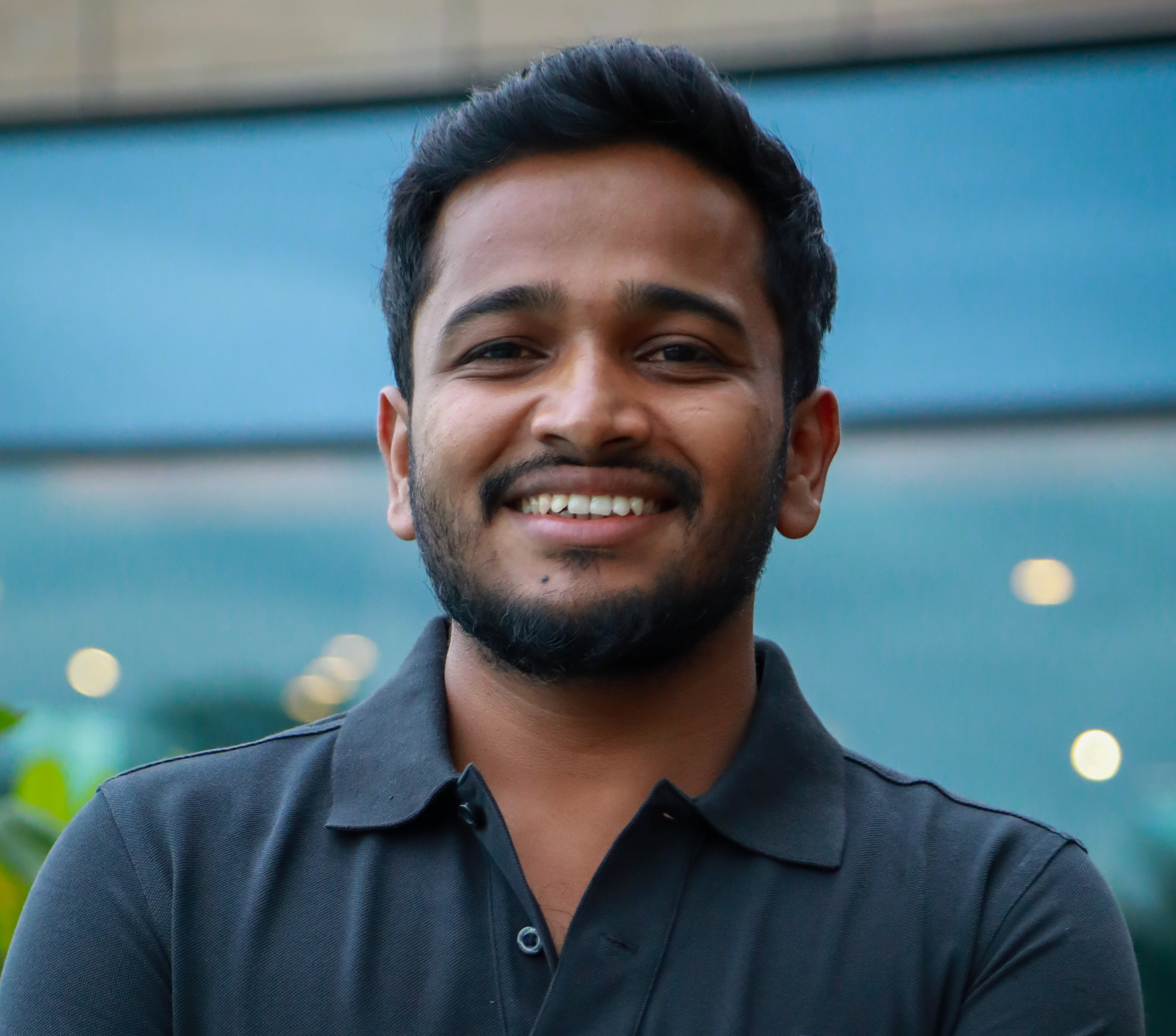
- The 2026 recipient: Basil Joseph
- Awarded for: Best Performance by an Actor in a Leading Role in Malayalam cinema
- Country: India
- Presented by: Vibri Media Group
- First award: 22 June 2012 (for films released in 2011)
- Most recent winner: Basil Joseph, Ponman (2025)

Highlights
- Most wins: Nivin Pauly (4)

SIIMA Critics Award for Best Actor – Malayalam is presented by Vibri media group as part of its annual South Indian International Movie Awards, for best acting done by an actor in Malayalam films, who are selected by the jury. The award was first given in 2012 for films released in 2011.

== Superlatives ==
- Nivin Pauly has maximum awards with four wins, followed by Fahadh Faasil, Kunchacko Boban and Prithviraj Sukumaran with two wins.
- Nivin Pauly and Prithviraj Sukumaran have also won the SIIMA for Best Actor – Malayalam.

== Winners ==
Year	Actor	Film	Ref.
2011	Salim Kumar	Adaminte Makan Abu	
2012	Fahadh Faasil	Diamond Necklace	
2013	Prithviraj Sukumaran	Mumbai Police	
2014	Prithviraj Sukumaran	7th Day	
2015	Nivin Pauly	Premam	
2016	Nivin Pauly	Action Hero Biju	
2017	Fahadh Faasil	Thondimuthalum Driksakshiyum	
2018	Nivin Pauly	Hey Jude	
2019	Nivin Pauly	Moothon	
2020	Kunchacko Boban	Anjaam Pathiraa	
2021	Biju Menon	Aarkkariyam	
2022	Kunchacko Boban	Nna Thaan Case Kodu	
2023	Joju George	Iratta	
2024	Unni Mukundan	Marco	
2025	Basil Joseph	Ponman	

== See also ==
- SIIMA Award for Best Actor – Malayalam
