= Aavesham =

Aavesham (lit. 'Frenzy') may refer to these Indian films:

- Aavesham (1979 film), in Malayalam
- Aavesham (2024 film), in Malayalam
  - Aavesham (soundtrack)

== See also ==
- Aavesha, a 1990 Indian film
- Avesh Khan, an Indian cricketer
