= South Indian International Movie Awards =

- Current: 14th South Indian International Movie Awards
- Awarded for: Excellence in the South Indian film industry
- Country: India
- Presented by: Vibri Media
- First award: 22 June 2012; 14 years ago
- Website: www.siima.in
- Related: Celebrity Cricket League; SIIMA Short Film Awards

The South Indian International Movie Awards (SIIMA) rewards the artistic and technical achievements of the South Indian film industry. It was launched in 2012 by Vishnu Vardhan Induri and Brinda Prasad Adusimilli to appreciate and honour film makers from across the South Indian film industries: Telugu cinema, Tamil cinema, Malayalam cinema, and Kannada cinema, and provide a platform to promote South Indian films in international markets.

== History ==
The ceremony was instituted in 2012 by Vishnu Vardhan Induri, the founder of Celebrity Cricket League. Adusumilli Brinda Prasad is the chairperson of SIIMA. The awards are presented in separate parts on two different days. On the first day the most promising upcoming South Indian film artistes are honoured at the Generation Next Awards, while the second day is reserved for the main SIIMA Awards. The award nominees are selected by a jury of senior artistes and professionals and voted for by public polling.

The first SIIMA ceremony was held on 21–22 June 2012 at the Dubai World Trade Centre in Dubai, United Arab Emirates. Unlike other South Indian film awards, SIIMA holds its ceremony abroad. However, in 2021, SIIMA was conducted in Hyderabad, India owing to the travel restrictions due to COVID-19 pandemic.

SIIMA Short Film Awards were announced in 2017 to recognise makers and actors of short films. In September 2017, a twitter emoji was released on the platform. Invenio Origin joined as the strategic partner in January 2024, with significant stake in SIIMA and CCL, to scale-up these formats, and to launch OTT Streaming Academy Awards through, a new media IP called Indian National Cine Academy (INCA).

== Ceremonies ==
#	Date	Host(s)	Venue	City	Country	Ref.
1st	21–22 June 2012	R Madhavan, Lakshmi Manchu, Parvathy Omanakuttan	Dubai World Trade Centre	Dubai	UAE	
2nd	12–13 September 2013	Shriya Saran, Rana Daggubati, Sonu Sood, Parvathy Omanakuttan, Ash Chandler	Expo Centre Sharjah	Sharjah	UAE	
3rd	12–13 September 2014	Navdeep, Shraddha Das (Telugu); Shiva, Pooja Ramachandran (Tamil)	Stadium Negara	Kuala Lumpur	Malaysia	
4th	6–7 August 2015	Rana Daggubati, Ali, Sreemukhi (Telugu); Shiva, Suchitra (Tamil)	Dubai World Trade Centre	Dubai	UAE	
5th	30–1 July 2016	Allu Sirish, Lakshmi Manchu (Telugu); Shiva, Sathish, Dhanya Balakrishna (Tamil); Ranjini Haridas (Malayalam)	Suntec Convention Centre	Singapore	Singapore	
6th	30–1 July 2017	Allu Sirish, Lakshmi Manchu (Telugu); Sathish, Dhanya Balakrishna (Tamil)	Abu Dhabi National Exhibition Centre	Abu Dhabi	UAE	
7th	14–15 September 2018	Rahul Ramakrishna, Priyadarshi Pullikonda, Sreemukhi (Telugu); Vijay Raghavendra, Samyuktha Hedge (Kannada)	Bollywood Parks Dubai	Dubai	UAE	
8th	15–16 August 2019	Rahul Ramakrishna, Priyadarshi Pullikonda, Suma Kanakala (Telugu); Janani Iyer, Mirchi Shiva (Tamil); Vijay Raghavendra, Anupama Gowda (Kannada); Pearle Maany (Malayalam)	Lusail Sports Arena	Doha	Qatar	
9th	18–19 September 2021	Sreemukhi, Sundeep Kishan (Telugu)	Hyderabad International Convention Center (HICC)	Hyderabad	India	
10th	10–11 September 2022	Sreemukhi, Ali, Siddhu (Telugu); Shiva, VJ Ramya (Tamil); Akul Balaji, Sonu Gowda (Kannada); Adil Ibrahim, Pearle Maaney (Malayalam)	Palace Ground	Bengaluru	India	
11th	15–16 September 2023	Priyadarshi, Kavya Kalyanram (Telugu); Sathish, Pavithra Lakshmi (Tamil); Akul Balaji, Anupama Gowda (Kannada); Govind Padmasoorya, Shilpa Bala (Malayalam)	Dubai World Trade Centre	Dubai	UAE	
12th	14–15 September 2024	Sudigali Sudheer, Simran Choudhary (Telugu); Bhavana Balakrishnan, Sathish (Tamil); Adil Ibrahim, Pearle Maaney (Malayalam); Rishi, Shubra Aiyappa (Kannada)	Dubai World Trade Centre	Dubai	UAE	
13th	5–6 September 2025	Sudigali Sudheer, Roopa Koduvayur (Telugu); Sathish (Tamil); Govind Padmasoorya (Malayalam); Rishi, Shubra Aiyappa (Kannada)	Dubai Exhibition Centre	Dubai	UAE	
14th	12–13 September 2026	Akul Balaji, Bindu Madhavi (Telugu); Sathish, Dhanya Balakrishna (Tamil); Govind Padmasoorya (Malayalam); Akul Balaji (Kannada)	Koramangala Indoor Stadium	Bengaluru	India	

== Categories ==
=== Telugu ===
- Best Film
- Best Director
- Best Cinematographer
- Best Actor
- Best Actress
- Best Supporting Actor
- Best Supporting Actress
- Best Actor in a Negative Role
- Best Comedian
- Best Male Debut
- Best Female Debut
- Best Debut Director
- Best Debut Producer
- Best Music Director
- Best Lyricist
- Best Male Playback Singer
- Best Female Playback Singer
- Critics Best Actor
- Critics Best Actress
- Critics Best Director

=== Tamil ===
- Best Film
- Best Director
- Best Cinematographer
- Best Actor
- Best Actress
- Best Supporting Actor
- Best Supporting Actress
- Best Actor in a Negative Role
- Best Comedian
- Best Male Debut
- Best Female Debut
- Best Debut Director
- Best Debut Producer
- Best Music Director
- Best Lyricist
- Best Male Playback Singer
- Best Female Playback Singer
- Critics Best Actor
- Critics Best Actress
- Critics Best Director

=== Malayalam ===
- Best Film
- Best Director
- Best Cinematographer
- Best Actor
- Best Actress
- Best Supporting Actor
- Best Supporting Actress
- Best Actor in a Negative Role
- Best Comedian
- Best Music Director
- Best Lyricist
- Best Male Playback Singer
- Best Female Playback Singer
- Best Male Debut
- Best Female Debut
- Best Debut Director
- Best Debut Producer
- Critics Best Actor
- Critics Best Actress
- Critics Best Director

=== Kannada ===
- Best Film
- Best Director
- Best Cinematographer
- Best Actor
- Best Actress
- Best Supporting Actor
- Best Supporting Actress
- Best Actor in a Negative Role
- Best Comedian
- Best Male Debut
- Best Female Debut
- Best Debut Director
- Best Debut Producer
- Best Music Director
- Best Lyricist
- Best Male Playback Singer
- Best Female Playback Singer
- Critics Best Actor
- Critics Best Actress
- Critics Best Director

=== Other ===
- SIIMA Lifetime Achievement Award
