= Huttu Habbada Shubhashayagalu =

2021 Indian Kannada crime thriller film

- Release Poster
- Directed by: Nagraj Bethur
- Written by: Venu Hasrali, Prasanna V.M
- Story by: Prasanna V.M.
- Produced by: T R Chandrashekhar
- Starring: Diganth; Kavitha Gowda
- Cinematography: Abhilash Kalathi
- Edited by: Srikanth Shroff
- Music by: Sridhar V. Sambhram
- Production company: Crystal Park Cinemas
- Distributed by: Crystal park Cinemas
- Release date: 31 December 2021
- Running time: 135 minutes
- Country: India
- Language: Kannada

Huttu Habbada Shubhashayagalu is a 2021 Indian Kannada crime-thriller film written by Prasanna and directed by debut director Nagaraj Bethur. Produced by TR Chandrashekhar under the banner Crystal Park Cinemas, it features Diganth and Kavitha Gowda in lead roles, with a supporting cast including Madenur Manu, Sujay Shastri, and Ajay. The score and soundtrack for the film is by Sridhar V Sambhram and the cinematography by Abhilash Kalathi.

== Cast ==
- Diganth as Arjun
- Kavitha Gowda as Ashika
- Madenuru Manu as Glucose
- Sujay Shastri as Siddarth Malhotra
- Rathan Ram as Vijay
- Ajay as Gaja
- Suraj as Ramesh
- Surya as Suresh
- Shanaya Katwe
- Sharanya Shetty
- Sridatta
- Srihari
- Amogha Varsha

== Production ==
Filming started on 10 May 2019, performing its muhurta in a temple at Bengaluru. Diganth Manchale was on board to play the lead character, but the team cast Kavitha Gowda. This was her third collaboration with the production house. The film was shot in and around Bengaluru mainly at a resort, and wrapped on 31 January 2020.

== Soundtrack ==
Huttu Habbada Shubhashayagalu

Soundtrack album by Sridhar V Sambhram
- Genre: Feature film soundtrack
- Language: Kannada
- Label: Crystal Music
- Producer: T R Chandrashekhar

Sridhar V Sambhram composed the film's background score and the soundtracks. The music rights were acquired by Crystal Music.

Tracklist
No.	Title	Lyrics	Singer(s)	Length
1.	"Yenne Hodedhare Aparadha"	Yogaraj Bhat	Shashank Sheshagiri, Impana Jeyaraj, Aishwarya Mahesh	3:14
Total length:				3:14

== Release ==
The first poster for the film featuring Diganth was released on 28 October 2019, coinciding with the Deepavali festival. The film's teaser was released on 5 March 2021, and a party song was released on 10 December 2021. The trailer of the film was released on 23 December 2021 by actor Upendra. The film was initially slated to release in Summer 2021 but owing to the COVID-19 pandemic the release was pushed to 31 December 2021.
