= SIIMA Award for Best Film – Tamil =

South Indian International Movie Awards

- Awarded for: Best Tamil-language film of the year
- Country: India
- Presented by: Vibri Media Group
- First award: 22 June 2012 (for films released in 2011)
- Most recent winner: Dragon (2025)

The SIIMA Award for Best Film – Tamil is an award, begun in 2012, presented annually at the South Indian International Movie Awards to a film and production house via viewers and the winner is announced at the ceremony. The nominations for the category are given by the jury members.

== Winners and nominees ==
Table key
‡	Indicates the winner

=== 2010s ===
Year (Note: Refers to the film's release year)	Film	Production House / Studio	Ref.
2011 (1st)	Ko ‡	RS Infotainment	
2011 (1st)	Aadukalam	Group Companys, Five Star Films/Sun Pictures/S. Kathiresan	
2011 (1st)	Azhagarsamiyin Kuthirai	Escape Artists Motion Pictures/P. Madhan	
2011 (1st)	Engeyum Eppothum	AR Murugadoss Productions/A. R. Murugadoss	
2011 (1st)	Mayakkam Enna	Aum Productions/Selvaraghavan, M. Prasad	
2012 (2nd)	Kumki ‡	Thirupathi Brothers	
2012 (2nd)	Pizza	Thirukumaran Entertainment	
2012 (2nd)	Sundarapandian	Company Productions	
2012 (2nd)	Thuppakki	V Creations	
2012 (2nd)	Vazhakku Enn 18/9	Thirupathi Brothers	
2013 (3rd)	Soodhu Kavvum ‡	Thirukumaran Entertainment	
2013 (3rd)	Paradesi	B Studios	
2013 (3rd)	Raja Rani	A.R Murugadoss Productions, The Next Big Film, Fox Star Studios	
2013 (3rd)	Singam II	Prince Pictures	
2013 (3rd)	Vishwaroopam	Raaj Kamal Films International	
2014 (4th)	Kaththi ‡	Lyca Productions	
2014 (4th)	Goli Soda	Roughnote Productions	
2014 (4th)	Jigarthanda	Group Company	
2014 (4th)	Madras	Studio Green	
2014 (4th)	Velaiyilla Pattathari	Wunderbar Films	
2015 (5th)	Thani Oruvan ‡	AGS Entertainment	
2015 (5th)	I	Aascar Films	
2015 (5th)	Kaaka Muttai	Wunderbar Films, Grass Root Film Company	
2015 (5th)	Naanum Rowdy Dhaan	Wunderbar Films	
2015 (5th)	OK Kanmani	Madras Talkies	
2016 (6th)	Irudhi Suttru ‡	YNOT Studios	
2016 (6th)	Joker	Dream Warrior Pictures	
2016 (6th)	Pichaikkaran	Vijay Antony Film Corporation	
2016 (6th)	Theri	V Creations	
2016 (6th)	Visaranai	Wunderbar Films, Grass Root Film Company	
2017 (7th)	Vikram Vedha ‡	YNOT Studios	
2017 (7th)	Aramm	KJR Studios	
2017 (7th)	Aruvi	Dream Warrior Pictures	
2017 (7th)	Mersal	Thenandal Studio Limited	
2017 (7th)	Theeran Adhigaaram Ondru	Dream Warrior Pictures	
2018 (8th)	Pariyerum Perumal ‡	Neelam Productions	
2018 (8th)	96	Madras Enterprises	
2018 (8th)	Kadaikutty Singam	2D Entertainment	
2018 (8th)	Sarkar	Sun Pictures	
2018 (8th)	Vada Chennai	Wunderbar Films	
2019 (9th)	Kaithi ‡	Dream Warrior Pictures	
2019 (9th)	Peranbu	Shree Rajalakshmi Films	
2019 (9th)	Asuran	V Creations	
2019 (9th)	Namma Veettu Pillai	Sun Pictures	
2019 (9th)	Viswasam	Sathya Jyothi Films	

=== 2020s ===
Year	Film	Production House / Studio	Ref.
2021 (10th)	Sarpatta Parambarai ‡	Neelam Productions	
2021 (10th)	Doctor	KJR Studios	
2021 (10th)	Karnan	V Creations	
2021 (10th)	Maanaadu	V House Productions	
2021 (10th)	Mandela	YNOT Studios	
2021 (10th)	Thalaivii	Vibri Motion Pictures, Karma Media	
2022 (11th)	Ponniyin Selvan: I ‡	Madras Talkies, Lyca Productions	
2022 (11th)	Love Today	AGS Entertainment	
2022 (11th)	Rocketry: The Nambi Effect	Tricolour Films, Varghese Moolan Pictures, 27th Entertainment	
2022 (11th)	Thiruchitrambalam	Sun Pictures	
2022 (11th)	Vikram	Raaj Kamal Films International	
2023 (12th)	Jailer ‡	Sun Pictures	
2023 (12th)	Leo	Seven Screen Studio	
2023 (12th)	Maamannan	Red Giant Movies	
2023 (12th)	Ponniyin Selvan: II	Madras Talkies, Lyca Productions	
2023 (12th)	Viduthalai Part 1	Grass Root Film Company, RS Infotainment	
2024 (13th)	Amaran ‡	Raaj Kamal Films International, Sony Pictures Films India	
2024 (13th)	Lubber Pandhu	Prince Pictures	
2024 (13th)	Maharaja	The Route, Think Studios, Passion Studios	
2024 (13th)	Meiyazhagan	2D Entertainment	
2024 (13th)	Viduthalai Part 2	RS Infotainment, Grass Root Film Company	
2025 (14th)	Dragon ‡	AGS Entertainment	
2025 (14th)	3BHK	Shanthi Talkies	
2025 (14th)	Bison Kaalamaadan	Applause Entertainment and Neelam Studios	
2025 (14th)	Kaantha	Spirit Media and Wayfarer Films	
2025 (14th)	Sirai	Seven Screen Studio	
2025 (14th)	Tourist Family	Million Dollar Studios and MRP Entertainment	
