= Forest (2025 film) =

Indian comedy thriller film

- Theatrical release poster
- Directed by: Chandra Mohan
- Written by: Satya Shaurya Sagar
- Screenplay by: Chandra Mohan; Satya Shaurya Sagar
- Story by: Chandra Mohan; Satya Shaurya Sagar
- Produced by: N M Kantharaj
- Starring: Chikkanna; Aniissh Tejeshwar; Gurunandan; Sharanya Shetty; Archana Kottige; Rangayana Raghu
- Cinematography: V. Ravikumar
- Edited by: Arjun Kittu
- Music by: Songs: Dharma Vish; Score: Anand Rajavikram
- Production company: NMK Cinemas
- Release date: 24 January 2025
- Running time: 145 minutes
- Country: India
- Language: Kannada

Forest is a 2025 Indian Kannada-language comedy thriller film directed and co-written by Chandra Mohan. It is produced by N. M. Kantharaj under his NMK Cinemas banner and features an ensemble cast of Chikkanna, Aniissh Tejeshwar, Gurunandan, Rangayana Raghu, Sooraj Pops, Sharanya Shetty and Archana Kottige.

Principal photography commenced in April 2023 and continued till January 2025 where most of the film being shot in the forest regions of Madikere, Chikmagalur, MM Hills and few portions being canned in Bengaluru. The film's cinematography was handled by V. Ravikumar and edited by Arjun Kittu. The music is composed by Veer Samarth and Dharma Vish.

Forest was released on 24 January 2025.

== Plot ==
The story unfolds in a remote village on the Karnataka–Tamil Nadu border, where a simmering feud over ancestral property sets the stage for chaos. Cousins Suresha (Anish Tejeshwar), Satisha (Gurunandan), and Meenakshi (Archana Kottige) are locked in a bitter dispute after Meenakshi decides to sell her share of land. Their quarrel draws in Kumar (Chikkanna), a hearing-impaired moneylender with romantic aspirations, and Gopalappa (Rangayana Raghu), a self-proclaimed mystic whose black magic business is more scam than sorcery.

The turning point comes when Meenakshi’s grandfather (Avinash), comatose for two decades and a former smuggler, briefly regains consciousness to reveal the existence of a hidden ₹20-crore treasure buried deep in the forest—only to die moments later. This revelation ignites greed among the villagers, prompting Suresha, Satisha, Meenakshi, Kumar, and Gopalappa to embark on a perilous treasure hunt.

As the group ventures into the dense wilderness of MM Hills, the forest emerges as a living, breathing entity shrouded in mystery. Their quest soon spirals into a survival drama when they encounter Beera (Sooraj Pops), the ghostly guardian of the treasure, inspired by the infamous brigand Veerappan. Beera’s spectral presence, along with the spirits of those he killed during his reign, turns the treasure hunt into a supernatural ordeal.

Gopalappa attempts to outwit the forces through voodoo rituals and cryptic mantras, but chaos ensues when a single drop of blood triggers bizarre phenomena centered on Meenakshi. A mysterious code—“J1952”—emerges as the key to unlocking the treasure’s secret, deepening the intrigue and fueling national curiosity. As greed collides with fear, the group faces betrayal, eerie encounters, and the wrath of the forest itself. The climax leaves audiences questioning whether the treasure is a blessing or a curse, as the survivors grapple with an unresolved mystery that blurs the line between life and afterlife.

== Cast ==
- Chikkanna as Buddy Kumara
- Aniissh Tejeshwar as Sathisha
- Gurunandan as Sunil
- Rangayana Raghu as Maakalpatti Gopalswamy
- Archana Kottige as Meenakshi
- Sharanya Shetty as Sandhya
- Avinash as Mani, Meenakshi's grandfather
- Sooraj Pops
- Prakash Thuminad
- Deepak Rai Panaje

== Production ==
Chandra Mohan, who previously directed Double Engine (2018) and Brahmachari (2019), announced his third film in April 2023. He roped in Chikkanna as one of the leads, with whom he worked in Double Engine previously. Rest of the cast was subsequently signed in. About 80% of the filming commenced in the forests of several districts in Karnataka.

== Soundtrack ==
The soundtrack consists of songs composed by Dharma Vish to the lyrics by Chetan Kumar and Puneeth Arya.

Track listing
No.	Title	Lyrics	Singer(s)	Length
1.	"Odo Odo Odo"	Puneeth Arya	Kailash Kher, Harsha Uppar	2:22
2.	"Paisa Paisa"	Chetan Kumar	Chandan Shetty	3:28
Total length:				6:20

== Reception ==
The movie received mixed reviews from critics, with a blend of positive and negative feedback on its humor and supernatural elements. The Times of India’s Sridevi S. wrote, “Forest is a decent attempt at blending comedy and supernatural thrills, with Chikkanna and R. Raghu’s chemistry standing out, though the narrative could have been tighter for a more impactful experience.” A. Sharadhaa of The New Indian Express said, “Forest is a fun ride with comedy, thrills, and supernatural twists, keeping viewers hooked with lively characters, though parts feel predictable.” Y. Maheswara Reddy of Bangalore Mirror noted, “Set in a dense forest, Forest delivers solid entertainment with humor and supernatural vibes, making it enjoyable despite small flaws.” Shashiprasad S. M. of Times Now added, “Forest offers endless fun and laughs in a supernatural jungle setting, with strong performances making it a hit with audiences.” In contrast, India Today’s Sanjay Ponnappa was critical, stating, “Forest aims for laughs but ends up disappointing, with a weak script and poor execution overshadowing its supernatural premise.”
