= Naguvina Hoogala Mele =

- Theatrical release poster
- Directed by: Venkat Bharadwaj
- Written by: Abhishek Iyengar (dialogues)
- Screenplay by: Venkat Bharadwaj
- Story by: Venkat Bharadwaj
- Produced by: K. K. Radhamohan
- Starring: Abhishek Das; Sharanya Shetty
- Cinematography: Pramod Bharateeya
- Edited by: Chandan P.
- Music by: Lovv Pran Mehta
- Production company: Sri Sathya Sai Arts
- Release date: 9 February 2024
- Country: India
- Language: Kannada

Naguvina Hoogala Mele (transl. On the flowers of laughter) is a 2024 Indian Kannada-language romantic action drama film co-written and directed by Venkat Bharadwaj and starring Abhishek Das and Sharanya Shetty.

== Cast ==
- Abhishek Das as Manohar a.k.a. Manu
- Sharanya Shetty as Dr. Tanu
- HarshGoBhat
- Girish Bettappa as Venky
- Bala Rajwadi as Tanu's father
- Jyothi Marur as elderly citizen
- Aasha Sujay
- Narendra Babu
- Baby Shilpa
- Benaka Nanjappa as elderly citizen

== Production ==
The film was based on a true incident and was produced by the Telugu production house Sri Sathya Sai Arts known for producing Bengal Tiger (2015). The film was shot at Trasi Beach, Hulikal Ghat, Mastigudi and Shivamogga. The film is set in the Malenadu region.

== Soundtrack ==
The music was composed by Lovv Pran Mehta.

Track listing
No.	Title	Lyrics	Singer(s)	Length
1.	"Gottilla Yarigu"	Chidambara Narendra	Tajinder Singh, Lovv Pran Mehta	3:17
2.	"Irali Bidu"	Pramod Marvante	Tajinder Singh, Niharika Nath, Lovv Pran Mehta	3:41
3.	"Muddu Baby"	Kiran Nagaraj	Ronnie, Meghana, Lovv Pran Mehta	2:51
Total length:				9:49

== Reception ==
Y Maheswara Reddy from Bangalore Mirror wrote that "It is worth a watch by all family members, especially youngsters". Harish Basavarajaiah from The Times of India rated the film three out of five stars and wrote that "Naguvina Hoogala Mele is a breezy love story, which showcases the joy of waiting in love and can be enjoyed in theatres with your partner". A critic from Asianet News wrote that "Abhidas, Sharanya Shetty, Bala Rajawadi, Asha Sujay are the backbone of this film which puts forth the principle that love has no time limit".
