= Vidaamuyarchi (soundtrack) =

- Soundtrack album cover

Soundtrack album by Anirudh Ravichander
- Released: 17 February 2025
- Recorded: October 2023 – December 2024
- Studio: Albuquerque Records, Chennai; Studio DMI, Las Vegas
- Genre: Feature film soundtrack
- Length: 13:08
- Language: Tamil
- Label: Sony Music India
- Producer: Anirudh Ravichander

Anirudh Ravichander chronology
Vettaiyan (2024)	Vidaamuyarchi (2025)	Kingdom (2025)

Singles from Vidaamuyarchi
- 1. "Sawadeeka" Released: 27 December 2024; 2. "Pathikichu" Released: 19 January 2025; 3. "Thaniye" Released: 5 February 2025

Vidaamuyarchi is the soundtrack album to the 2025 Tamil film of the same name directed by Magizh Thirumeni and produced by Subaskaran Allirajah's Lyca Productions starring Ajith Kumar. The soundtrack is composed by Anirudh Ravichander and was released under Sony Music India label.

== Production ==
The music and background score are composed by Anirudh Ravichander, in his third collaboration with Ajith after Vedalam (2015), Vivegam (2017); first with Magizh. Magizh revealed that he shared a great working relationship with the composer and added "He is always open to suggestions and what I trust more than anything else is his instinct. He has the knack of understanding the kind of film he is working on and what the film requires. I have grown to trust him and I keep telling him that he is one of my biggest strengths." Since the film is a travel-based whodunit set outside India, Anirudh provided an international soundscape for the film's score.

== Release ==
The film's music rights were acquired by Sony Music India. The theme music which featured in the film's teaser trailer was released on 29 November 2024. The first single, "Sawadeeka" performed by Anthony Daasan with lyrics written by Arivu, released on 27 December 2024. An accompanying music video featuring Anirudh and Anthony Daasan, with snippets from the film and a lyrical video was released on the same day. The second single "Pathikichu" was released on 19 January 2025. It was written by Vishnu Edavan and performed by Anirudh and Yogi Sekar, with rap vocals written and performed by Amogh Balaji, and backing vocals by Yogi Sekar, Shenbagaraj, Shibi Srinivasan, and Govind Prasad. The third single "Thaniye" was released on 5 February 2025. The full album was released on 17 February 2025.

== Track listing ==
Tamil
No.	Title	Lyrics	Singer(s)	Length
1.	"Sawadeeka"	Arivu	Anthony Daasan, Anirudh Ravichander	3.24
2.	"Thaniye"	Mohan Rajan	Anirudh Ravichander	3:19
3.	"Pathikichu"	Vishnu Edavan, Amogh Balaji	Anirudh Ravichander, Yogi Sekar, Amogh Balaji	3:28
4.	"Perseverance Theme"	Amogh Balaji	Amogh Balaji	2:54
Total length:				12:56

Telugu
No.	Title	Lyrics	Singer(s)	Length
1.	"Sawadeeka"	Sri Sai Kiran	Anthony Daasan	3.24
2.	"Manase"	Srinivasa Mouli	Anirudh Ravichander, Yasaswi Kondepudi	3:19
3.	"Pattudala"	Krishna Kanth, Amogh Balaji	Anirudh Ravichander, Amogh Balaji, Saatvik G. Rao	3:28
4.	"Perseverance Theme"	Amogh Balaji	Amogh Balaji	2:54
Total length:				12:56

== Non-album tracks ==
The separate musical piece which soundtracked the film's teaser was released under the title "Vidaamuyarchi Theme" on 29 November 2024, few hours after the teaser's release.

No.	Title	Singer(s)	Length
1.	"Vidaamuyarchi Theme"	Instrumental	1:36
