= Illuminati (Dabzee song) =

2024 single by Sushin Shyam and Vinayak Sasikumar featuring Dabzee

Single by Sushin Shyam and Vinayak Sasikumar featuring Dabzee

from the album Aavesham
- Language: Malayalam
- Released: 28 March 2024
- Recorded: 2024
- Studio: Sonic Island Studios, Kochi; M Lounge Studios, Kochi; Soundtown Studios, Chennai; Voice and Vision Studios, Chennai
- Genre: EDM; Indian folk
- Length: 3:33
- Label: Think Music
- Composer: Sushin Shyam
- Lyricist: Vinayak Sasikumar
- Producer: Sushin Shyam

Aavesham track listing
- 1. "Mathapithakkale"; 2. "Adholokam"; 3. "Thurupu Cheetu"; 4. "Galatta"; 5. "The Last Dance"; 6. "Odimaga"; 7. "Jaada"; 8. "Armadham"; 9. "Illuminati"

Music video
- "Illuminati" on YouTube

"Illuminati" is the 2024 song composed by Sushin Shyam, with lyrics written by Vinayak Sasikumar and performed by Dabzee for the soundtrack to the Malayalam-language film Aavesham directed by Jithu Madhavan, starring Fahadh Faasil. It was released as a single on 28 March 2024 under the Think Music label. The song was featured in the end credits of the film, and a promotional music video, featuring the supporting cast members, was released on 9 May 2024, under the Think Originals banner.

The origin of the song was derived from Faasil's character Ranga, which was conceived as a fan anthem to the character. The song received widespread commercial success, praising the composition and its upbeat tune, and led to numerous fan covers and recreations of the hook steps which was done by Faasil at a live performance of the song in an event and at the promotional music video.

== Production, composition and lyrics ==
"Illuminati" was composed by Sushin Shyam who perceived an upbeat number inspired by the likes of composer Anirudh Ravichander. It was a "dappankuttu-meets-Western-number style song", according to Sasikumar and the song depicts about Ranga (Faasil) that "comically exploring his larger-than-lifeness".

Sasikumar used the term "illuminati" after he met a gangster during college days, referencing his cool nature. He described the song as a "fan anthem" to Ranga describing him as a "god" and "illuminati" and was written in a way so that the listener should laugh it off but also wonder if it is true after all. In the songwriting process, he coined a new term "Mallu-minati" referencing for a "cool, thug Malayali".

While writing the lyrics, Sasikumar refrained from being sounded over-the-top and also worried on the lyrics being overshadowed but felt that it worked well in the film.

== Marketing and release ==
The song was first introduced at a promotional event for the film held at Union Christian College, Aluva on 26 March 2024, where the singer Dabzee performed the song live with Faasil dancing to the song with students. Following the reception, it was separately released on 28 March 2024 through music streaming platforms in an audio-only format. A video of the song that compiled snippets from the live performance at the promotional event and from the film, was released on 4 April. While the song's full-length version was around three-and-a-half minutes, the video version runs only for two-and-a-half minutes.

== Music video ==
Since the song appeared in the film's end credits, a separate music video was filmed for the song. On 9 May 2024, the video was released by Think Music under the "Think Originals" banner, and features Sajin Gopu, Hipster, Mithun Jai Shankar and Roshan Shanavas, who acted in principal characters, alongside the singer Dabzee. The music video was directed by Ken Royson, filmed by AJ Tippu and choreographed by Shakthivel and Arnold Charles of The Dancers Club. The music video met with positive reception from audiences, with praise for the choreography and visuals.

== Reception ==
Calling it as a "standout addition to the soundtrack", a reviewer from The Times of India wrote "Infused with elements reminiscent of Tamil dance numbers, the track promises to captivate audiences with its pulsating beats and invigorating energy, setting the stage for an adrenaline-fueled cinematic experience." Writing for The New Indian Express, Vignesh Madhu criticized the placement of the song in the closing credits.

== Impact ==
The song became immensely popular across the country, leading to numerous cover versions and recreations of the dance steps. A Kerala-based children's band Dabba Beat, originated from the Kollannur village in Thrissur, performed the cover version using scrap items as instruments. At an award show, hosted by the Association of Malayalam Movie Artists (AMMA) on 21 August 2024, Faasil, along with Dhyan Sreenivasan, Mukesh and Gopu danced to the song on stage. The video was shared by actor Chemban Vinod Jose through his social media accounts. The song was included in a video posted by Wimbeldon's official Instagram account praising Spanish tennis player Carlos Alcaraz.

== Controversy ==
Bishop Joseph Karayil was critical of the song "Illuminati" due to its anti-Christian nature.

== Charts ==
Weekly chat performance for "Illuminati"
Chart (2024)	Peak position
India (Billboard) ("Illuminati")	2
UK Asian Music Chart (OCC) ("Illuminati")	8

== Credits and personnel ==
Credits adapted from Think Music India

- Sushin Shyam – composer, arranger, producer
- Dabzee – vocals
- Vinayak Sasikumar – lyrics
- Nivin Raphael – additional music production
- Krishna Balesh – shehnai
- Maxwell – trumpet
- Sruthiraj – percussion
- Raju – percussion
- Aswin Vijayan – chorus
- Soorya Shyam Gopal – chorus
- Milan Joy – chorus
- Arjun Shankar – recording engineer (Sonic Island Studios, Kochi)
- Shyamaprasad M – recording engineer (MLounge Studios, Kochi)
- Midhun Manoj – recording engineer (Soundtown Studios, Chennai)
- Vishnu Shankar – recording engineer (Soundtown Studios, Chennai)
- Abin Paul – mixing engineer
- Vivek Thomas – stem mixing and mastering engineer (VTP Studios, Kochi)
- Sibin Wilson – mixing assistance
- Donan Whelan – mastering engineer (Mastering World, London)
- K. D. Vincent – music co-ordinator
