= Sharanya Shetty =

Indian actress

- Born: 11 May 1999 (age 27); Shivamogga, Karnataka, India
- Education: Engineering Graduate
- Occupation: Actress
- Years active: 2019–present

Sharanya Shetty is an Indian actress, who has appeared in Kannada-language films and advertisements. Sharanya is known for her role in the Krishnam Pranaya Sakhi.

== Personal life ==
Sharanya was born in Shivamogga, Karnataka, and grew up in Bangalore. She completed her engineering studies. Although her parents wanted her to become a doctor or an engineer, Sharanya always had a passion for acting, which she pursued successfully.

== Career ==
Sharanya started her career as a model participating in Miss South India 2018 where she even made it to the finalist and she won the tag of Miss Social Media India 2018 and Miss Beautiful Smile 2018 in the contest. Sharanya also represented Karnataka in Miss Queen of India 2019 and won the title Miss South India in 2019.

She gained fame through the television serial Gattimela, where she was recognized for her portrayal of Sahitya, a negative lead character. In 2020, she ventured into films and won the SIIMA Best Debutant Actress award in 2021 for her performance in the movie 1980, acting alongside Priyanka Upendra. In 2021, she appeared in Huttu Habbada Shubhashayagalu with Diganth.

Her subsequent projects include the 2023 film Spooky College and the 2024 release Naguvina Hoogala Mele, directed by Venkat Bharadwaj. In the same year, she featured in Krishnam Pranaya Sakhi alongside Ganesh. Her upcoming project is the film Forest.

== Filmography ==
- Note: all films are in Kannada, unless otherwise noted.

| Year | Title | Roles | Notes |
|---|---|---|---|
| 2021 | Huttu Habbada Shubhashayagalu | | |
| 2021 | 1980 | Sanvi | |
| 2023 | Spooky College | | |
| 2024 | Krishnam Pranaya Sakhi | Jhanvi | |
| 2024 | Naguvina Hoogala Mele | Dr. Tanu | |
| 2025 | Forest | Sandhya | |
