= Krishnam Pranaya Sakhi =

2024 Kannada-language film

- Theatrical release poster
- Directed by: Srinivas Raju
- Written by: A. V. Shiva Sai
- Produced by: Prashant G. Rudrappa
- Starring: Ganesh; Malvika Nair; Sharanya Shetty
- Cinematography: Venkat Rama Prasad
- Edited by: K. M. Prakash
- Music by: Arjun Janya
- Production company: Trishul Entertainments
- Distributed by: KVN Productions
- Release date: 15 August 2024
- Country: India
- Language: Kannada
- Box office: ₹ 25.20 crores

Krishnam Pranaya Sakhi is a 2024 Indian Kannada-language romantic comedy film directed by Srinivas Raju and produced by Prashant G. Rudrappa under Trishul Entertainments. The film stars Ganesh, Malvika Nair (in her Kannada debut) and Sharanya Shetty, alongside Sadhu Kokila, Rangayana Raghu, Shruti and Srinivasa Murthy.

Krishnam Pranaya Sakhi was released on 15 August 2024, coinciding with Independence Day. The film received mixed-to-positive reviews and became a commercial success at the box office.

== Plot ==
Krishna, a business tycoon, meets Pranaya, an orphan who runs an orphanage. Krishna, worried that his socio-economic status may separate him from Pranaya, pretends to be a driver and becomes employed by Pranaya. Pranaya soon learns about Krishna's identity, but she later accepts his love.

Jhanvi, a hot-headed daughter of a businessman Gurudutt, falls in love with Krishna. Though denying the proposal due to a past history with Krishna's family, Gurudutt agrees and Krishna's family asks Krishna about this, but Krishna denies it and reveals about Pranaya to the family. Krishna's family agrees and he marries Pranaya. Before they can enjoy their happily-ever-after, Krishna and Pranaya become victims of a violent attack.

Krishna suffers from retrograde amnesia, leaving him to forget about Pranaya. Krishna's family and Pranaya doesn't reveal anything about it and Pranaya pretends to be Krishna's assistant. Jhanvi learns about this and tries to make Krishna fall in love with her, but Krishna rejects the proposal and soon falls for Pranaya. It is revealed that Jhanvi was actually behind the attack on Krishna and Pranaya as she wants to exact revenge on Krishna for marrying Pranaya. A series of comedic events ensues in which Krishna and Pranaya remarry.

== Cast ==
- Ganesh as Krishna
- Malvika Nair as Pranaya
- Sharanya Shetty as Jhanvi
- Sadhu Kokila as "Ushna" Kumar
- Rangayana Raghu as Bhoomdevru
- Avinash as Gurudutt, Jhanvi's father
- Shashi Kumar as Shashiraj, Krishna's father
- Shruti as Krishna's mother
- Ashok as Padmaraj, Krishna's uncle
- Ramakrishna as Rajaram, Krishna's uncle
- Shivadhwaj as Shivaraj, Krishna's uncle
- Srinivasa Murthy
- Kuri Prathap as Lathesh
- Manasi Sudhir
- Giri Shivanna as Kadak
- Ambuja
- Rukmini Krishna
- Sangeetha

== Production ==
The film was shot in Mysore, Bangalore, Italy, Malta and Vietnam.

== Soundtrack ==
Krishnam Pranaya Sakhi

Soundtrack album by Arjun Janya
- Genre: Feature film soundtrack
- Language: Kannada
- Label: Anand Audio
- Producer: Arjun Janya

Arjun Janya chronology
Upadhyaksha (2024)	Krishnam Pranaya Sakhi (2024)	Aaraam Arvind Swamy (2024)

Track listing
No.	Title	Lyrics	Music	Singer(s)	Length
1.	"My Marriage is Fixed"	Nishan Rai	Arjun Janya	Chandan Shetty	3:24
2.	"Chinnamma"	Kaviraj	Arjun Janya	Kailash Kher, Indu Nagaraj	3:33
3.	"Dwapara"	V. Nagendra Prasad	Arjun Janya	Jaskaran Singh	4:58
4.	"Hey Gagana"	V. Nagendra Prasad	Arjun Janya	Sonu Nigam, Chinmayi Sripaada	4:39
5.	"Ninna Hegalu"	Kaviraj	Sai Karthik	K. S. Chithra	3:21
6.	"Kaadadeye Hegirali"	Jayant Kaikini	Arjun Janya	Prithwi Bhat, Gautham Nair	3:34

== Release ==
The film was earlier reported to be release in July. Later it was released on 15 August 2024. The film ran for more than 50 days in select centers across Karnataka.

== Reception ==
=== Critical reception ===
Shashiprasad SM of Times Now gave a rating of 3 out of 5, saying "Golden Star Ganesh Finds His Way Back To Form" and opined that "the other biggest highlight of the film is the music scored by Arjun Janya".

=== Box Office ===
The movie collected ₹1.25 crores on its first day. The movie was reported to have sold 49,000 tickets on its first Saturday with the three day gross being ₹4.82 crores to ₹ 5 crores. The four day extended weekend collection was reported to be ₹7.26 crores. The five day collection was reported to be between ₹7.09 crores (net) to ₹8.11 crores (gross). The ten days gross was reported to be ₹12.74 crores. The movie was reported to have crossed ₹20 crores gross by the end of second Monday. The gross collections were reported to have crossed ₹25 crores at the end of 25 days.
