= Manjummel Boys (soundtrack) =

Soundtrack album by Sushin Shyam
- Released: 21 February 2024
- Recorded: 2023–2024
- Venues: Kochi; Chennai
- Studios: 20db Studios; VTP Studios; Music Lounge
- Genre: Feature film soundtrack
- Length: 18:05
- Language: Malayalam
- Label: Think Music
- Producer: Sushin Shyam

Sushin Shyam chronology
| Kannur Squad (2023) | Manjummel Boys (2024) | Aavesham (2024) |

Singles from Manjummel Boys
- 1. "Kuthanthiram" Released: 25 January 2024; 2. "Kuthanthiram (Extended Version)" Released: 25 January 2024; 3. "Nebulakal (Travel Song)" Released: 16 February 2024

Manjummel Boys is the soundtrack to the 2024 film of the same name directed by Chidambaram S. Poduval and produced by Babu Shahir, Soubin Shahir and Shawn Antony under the banner Parava Films. The film features an ensemble cast of Soubin, Sreenath Bhasi, Balu Varghese, Ganapathi S. Poduval, Lal Jr., Deepak Parambol, Abhiram Radhakrishnan, Arun Kurian, Khalid Rahman, Chandu Salimkumar, Shebin Benson, and Vishnu Reghu.

The soundtrack to the film featured four songs composed by Sushin Shyam with lyrics written by Vedan, Anwar Ali and Vinayak Sasikumar. After being preceded by three singles, the soundtrack was released under the Think Music label on 21 February 2024. The album won the Best Music award at the Kino Bravo International Film Festival in Sochi, Russia. The film was the only Indian film in the festival's competitive section. Director Chidambaram S Poduval accepted the award on behalf of the film team.

== Background ==
Manjummel Boys marked the maiden collaboration between Chidambaram and Shyam. After signing the project, Chidambaram requested Shyam to watch the documentary regarding the real-life incident where the film is based on, so that he could gain a deeper understanding of the characters and their emotions. The duo eventually went to Kodaikanal for location scouting and eventually remained there composing the tunes for the film to comprehend the aura of the location. Though, Shyam felt challenging to work on a survival drama film similar to Buried (2010), he eventually garnered several ideas from Chidambaram during the story discussions and conversation.

Recording of the songs began during October 2023 and completed within February 2024. In an interview to 94.3 Club FM, Shyam teased a travel song (deciphered as "Nebulakal") which was composed in a way that was reminiscent of his earlier days as an independent music composer.

== Release ==
Manjummel Boys' soundtrack featured four songs which was released under the Think Music label on 21 February 2024. Three of them were released as singles. The promo video for the first song "Kuthanthiram" was released on 25 January 2024. The song featured Shyam collaborating with rapper-songwriter Vedan, that includes clips from the film. The promo video is directed by Down Trodden and filmed by Samuel Henry. An extended five-minute version of the song was also released on the same date. The third song "Nebulakal" was released on 16 February 2024, with an accompanying music video that showcased the principal cast travelling to Kodaikanal. The lyrical video for the fourth song "Thaai Manam" was released on 1 March 2024.

== Track listing ==
| No. | Title | Lyrics | Singer(s) | Length |
|---|---|---|---|---|
| 1. | "Kuthanthram" | Vedan | Sushin Shyam, Vedan | 04:03 |
| 2. | "Kuthanthram" (Extended Version) | Vedan | Sushin Shyam, Vedan | 05:04 |
| 3. | "Nebulakal" (Travel Song) | Anwar Ali | Pradeep Kumar | 04:47 |
| 4. | "Thaai Manam" | Vinayak Sasikumar | Sushin Shyam, Urmila Krishnan | 04:10 |
| Total length: | | | | 18:05 |

== Reception ==
S. R. Praveen of The Hindu described Shyam's music being "immersive and understated"; he further appreciated Shyam for the placement of the song "Kanmani Anbodu Kadhalan" from Gunaa (1991) at the end of the rescue sequence where it was "so elegantly pulled off that it almost manages to rewrite the memory of the scene in the original". Anandu Suresh of The Indian Express wrote that Shyam "elevates the film with compelling background tracks, skillfully evoking a spectrum of emotions". Princy Alexander of Manorama Online wrote that the songs and background score "blend well with the film". Gopika IS of The Times of India wrote "The background score contributed to some scenes without making it too dramatic." Arjun Menon of Rediff.com wrote "Sushin Shyam lifts the film through his synth based score that is reminiscent of the early 2000s [...] The score keeps the tonal shifts between the gloomy, sludge filled rescue to the heightened fantasy of the childhood sequences fairly seamless. Sushin charts a road map for the emotional journey of the characters without being overly showy."

In October 2024, Shyam submitted the film's score for consideration in the 67th Grammy Awards under the Best Score Soundtrack for Visual Media category.

At the Kerala State Film Awards 2024, Vedan won the Best Lyricist award for the song "Kuthanthram".
