= Vettaiyan (soundtrack) =

- Soundtrack album cover

Soundtrack album by Anirudh Ravichander
- Released: 14 October 2024
- Recorded: 2023–2024
- Studios: Albuquerque Records, Chennai; AM Studios, Chennai; Studio DMI, Las Vegas
- Genre: Feature film soundtrack
- Length: 21:35
- Language: Tamil
- Label: Sony Music
- Producer: Anirudh Ravichander

Anirudh Ravichander chronology
Devara: Part 1 (2024)	Vettaiyan (2024)	Vidaamuyarchi (2025)

Singles from Vettaiyan
- 1. "Manasilaayo" Released: 9 September 2024; 2. "Hunter Vantaar" Released: 20 September 2024; 3. "Uchathila" Released: 11 October 2024

Vettaiyan is the soundtrack album to the 2024 Indian Tamil-language film of the same name directed by T. J. Gnanavel and produced by Subaskaran Allirajah's Lyca Productions starring Rajinikanth in the titular lead role. The film's musical score is composed by Anirudh Ravichander. The songs "Manasilaayo", "Hunter Vantaar" and "Uchathila" were released as singles from the album. The full album containing 9 tracks was released by Sony Music India on 14 October 2024.

== Background ==
In March 2023, the film was announced under the tentative title Thalaivar 170, (Note: Rajinikanth's 170th film as a leading actor) and Anirudh was brought on board for composing the film's music. This film marked Anirudh's fourth collaboration with Rajinikanth after Petta (2019), Darbar (2020) and Jailer (2023) and his maiden collaboration with Gnanavel. Anirudh, who liked Gnanavel's Jai Bhim (2021), accepted the offer after reading the script and felt that it would create a huge impact, connecting with the sensibilities of the audience due to the theme and story.

== Production ==
The song "Manasilaayo" was set in the background of an event taking place in the borders of Tamil Nadu and Kerala, and because of the geography, Anirudh planned to compose a song for it. Super Subu and Vishnu Edavan jointly wrote the lyrics despite their minimal understanding of Malayalam, and Deepthi Suresh performed the female vocals. It initially had raw vocals sung by Anirudh, but as Rajinikanth had to lip sync for his portions, Anirudh decided to use the vocals of Malaysia Vasudevan, generated via artificial intelligence, after Rajinikanth's suggestion. Vasudevan's final song he recorded was "Happy" from Bale Pandiya (2010) before his death on 20 February 2011. T. R. Krishna Chetan, the CEO of the music production company Pitch Innovations, helped Anirudh on generating the AI vocals. The rough track of the song had vocals by Vasudevan's son Yugendran, which were converted through AI. Initially, Anirudh wanted to use the sample recording of "Singam Ondru Purapattadhae" from Arunachalam (1997) due to the high-resolution audio quality (digital recording was popular during the mid-1990s), but he eventually settled on using his vocals featured in "Podhuvaga Emmanasu Thangam" from Murattu Kaalai (1980) as he believed that it provided the retro mood which led to that being used to generate AI vocals. The concluding rap portions were performed by Subu but were changed to Vasudevan's via AI to sync with Rajinikanth's voice onscreen.

Ahead of the audio launch, on 18 September, Anirudh shared a making of the song "Hunter Vantaar" with singer Siddharth Basrur performing. The song would feature lyrics by Arivu and while it indicated the actor's on and off-screen persona, it was further criticized for the "self-praising lyrics". In an interview with The Hindu, Gnanavel deciphered that the film featured a "soulful track" performed by Sean Roldan (later deciphered as "Uchathila").

== Release ==
In mid-August 2024, the song "Manasilaayo" was announced, and released as the first single from the album on 5 September 2024. The film's music launch was held at Jawaharlal Nehru Indoor Stadium in Chennai on 20 September 2024, with the presence of the cast and crew and a musical performance by Anirudh. However, the album was not launched at the event; the second single titled "Hunter Vantaar" was released prior to the event. The third single "Uchathila" was released on 11 October 2024, after the film's release.

On 13 October 2024, Anirudh shared the album's track list through his social media accounts which featured nine songs including the previously released singles. He also assured that the album would be released soon. The full album was released on 14 October 2024. The album received positive reviews from critics and audience.

== Track listing ==
=== Tamil ===
No.	Title	Lyrics	Singer(s)	Length
1.	"Manasilaayo"	Super Subu, Vishnu Edavan	Malaysia Vasudevan, (Note: Via artificial intelligence.) Yugendran, Anirudh Ravichander, Deepthi Suresh	3:56
2.	"Clean Shot"	Amogh Balaji	Malaysia Vasudevan, Amogh Balaji	2:34
3.	"Hunter Vantaar"	Arivu	Siddharth Basrur	3:12
4.	"Big B Theme" (Instrumental)	–	–	2:02
5.	"Uchathila"	Yugabharathi	Sean Roldan	3:12
6.	"Battery Theme" (Instrumental)	–	–	1:39
7.	"Hands Up"	Heisenberg	Anirudh Ravichander	1:10
8.	"Vaazh Veesum"	Yugabharathi	Anirudh Ravichander	1:52
9.	"Vettaiyan Theme" (Instrumental)	–	–	1:56
Total length:				21:35

=== Telugu ===
No.	Title	Lyrics	Singer(s)	Length
1.	"Manasilaayo"	Srinivasa Mouli	Nakash Aziz, Arun Kaundinya, Deepthi Suresh	3:56
2.	"Clean Shot"	Amogh Balaji	Malaysia Vasudevan, Amogh Balaji	2:34
3.	"Hunter Entry"	Srinivasa Mouli	Siddharth Basrur	3:12
4.	"Big B Theme" (Instrumental)	–	–	2:02
5.	"Manduthunna"	Krishna Kanth	Ritesh G. Rao	3:12
6.	"Battery Theme" (Instrumental)	–	–	1:39
7.	"Hands Up"	Heisenberg	Anirudh Ravichander	1:10
8.	"Rakasi Vidhi"	Krishna Kanth	Ravi G	1:54
9.	"Vettaiyan Theme" (Instrumental)	–	–	1:56
Total length:				21:37

=== Kannada ===
No.	Title	Lyrics	Singer(s)	Length
1.	"Manasilaayo"	Varadaraj Chikkaballapura	Nakash Aziz, Arun Kaundinya, Deepthi Suresh	3:56
2.	"Clean Shot"	Amogh Balaji	Malaysia Vasudevan, Amogh Balaji	2:34
3.	"Hunter Bandha"	Varadaraj Chikkaballapura	Siddharth Basrur	3:12
4.	"Big B Theme" (Instrumental)	–	–	2:02
5.	"Minuguva"	Varadaraj Chikkaballapura	Ritesh G. Rao	3:12
6.	"Battery Theme" (Instrumental)	–	–	1:39
7.	"Hands Up"	Heisenberg	Anirudh Ravichander	1:10
8.	"Vidhiya Bete"	Varadaraj Chikkaballapura	Ravi G	1:54
9.	"Vettaiyan Theme" (Instrumental)	–	–	1:56
Total length:				21:37

=== Hindi ===
No.	Title	Lyrics	Singer(s)	Length
1.	"Manasilaayo"	Raqueeb Alam	Nakash Aziz, Arun Kaundinya, Deepthi Suresh	3:56
2.	"Clean Shot"	Amogh Balaji	Malaysia Vasudevan, Amogh Balaji	2:34
3.	"Hunter Ka Avtaar"	Raqueeb Alam	Siddharth Basrur	3:12
4.	"Big B Theme" (Instrumental)	–	–	2:02
5.	"Ugte Sooraj"	Raqueeb Alam	Ritesh G. Rao	3:12
6.	"Battery Theme" (Instrumental)	–	–	1:39
7.	"Hands Up"	Heisenberg	Anirudh Ravichander	1:10
8.	"Jang Chhede"	Raqueeb Alam	Ravi G	1:54
9.	"Vettaiyan Theme" (Instrumental)	–	–	1:56
Total length:				21:37
