= SIIMA for Best Actor – Malayalam =

SIIMA Award for Best Actor – Malayalam
- The 2026 recipient: Nivin Pauly
- Awarded for: Best Performance by an Actor in a Leading Role in Malayalam cinema
- Country: India
- Presented by: Vibri Media Group
- First award: 22 June 2012 (for films released in 2011)
- Most recent winner: Nivin Pauly, Sarvam Maya (2025)

Highlights
- Most wins: Tovino Thomas (4)
- Most nominations: Fahadh Faasil (8)

The SIIMA Award for Best Actor – Malayalam is an award, begun in 2012, presented annually at the South Indian International Movie Awards to an actor in a leading role. The nominations for the category are given by the jury members. The first recipient of this award was Mohanlal received at the 1st South Indian International Movie Awards held on 22 June 2012 in Dubai.

== Superlatives ==
Categories	Actor	Record
Most wins	Tovino Thomas	4
Most wins	Mohanlal	4
Most consecutive wins	Tovino Thomas	3 (2021–2023)
Most nominations	Mammootty	9
Most consecutive nominations	Tovino Thomas	5 (2020–2024)
Most nominations without a win	Fahadh Faasil	8

== Winners and nominations ==
=== 2010s ===
Year	Actor	Film	Ref.
2011 (1st)	Mohanlal	Pranayam	
2012 (2nd)	Mohanlal	Spirit	
2012 (2nd)	Fahadh Faasil	Diamond Necklace	
2012 (2nd)	Prithviraj Sukumaran	Ayalum Njanum Thammil	
2012 (2nd)	Lal	Ozhimuri	
2012 (2nd)	Manoj K. Jayan	Ardhanaari	
2013 (3rd)	Dileep	Sound Thoma	
2013 (3rd)	Mohanlal	Drishyam	
2013 (3rd)	Fahadh Faasil	North 24 Kaatham	
2013 (3rd)	Prithviraj Sukumaran	Mumbai Police	
2013 (3rd)	Mammootty	Immanuel	
2014 (4th)	Nivin Pauly	1983	
2014 (4th)	Mammootty	Varsham	
2014 (4th)	Fahadh Faasil	Iyobinte Pusthakam	
2014 (4th)	Prithviraj Sukumaran	7th Day	
2014 (4th)	Dulquar Salmaan	Njaan	
2015 (5th)	Prithviraj Sukumaran	Ennu Ninte Moideen	
2015 (5th)	Dulquer Salmaan	Charlie	
2015 (5th)	Jayasurya	Su Su Sudhi Vathmeekam	
2015 (5th)	Mammootty	Pathemari	
2015 (5th)	Nivin Pauly	Premam	
2016 (6th)	Mohanlal	Pulimurugan	
2016 (6th)	Biju Menon	Anuraga Karikkin Vellam	
2016 (6th)	Nivin Pauly	Jacobinte Swargarajyam	
2016 (6th)	Fahadh Faasil	Maheshinte Prathikaaram	
2016 (6th)	Nivin Pauly	Action Hero Biju	
2017 (7th)	Nivin Pauly	Njandukalude Nattil Oridavela	
2017 (7th)	Dulquer Salmaan	Solo	
2017 (7th)	Fahadh Faasil	Thondimuthalum Driksakshiyum	
2017 (7th)	Mammootty	The Great Father	
2017 (7th)	Tovino Thomas	Mayaanadhi	
2018 (8th)	Tovino Thomas	Theevandi	
2018 (8th)	Jayasurya	Captain	
2018 (8th)	Joju George	Joseph	
2018 (8th)	Mohanlal	Odiyan	
2018 (8th)	Prithviraj Sukumaran	Koode	
2019 (9th)	Mohanlal	Lucifer	
2019 (9th)	Mammotty	Unda	
2019 (9th)	Nivin Pauly	Moothon	
2019 (9th)	Asif Ali	Kettyolaanu Ente Malakha	
2019 (9th)	Suraj Venjaramoodu	Vikruthi, Android Kunjappan Version 5.25	

=== 2020s ===
Year	Actress	Film	Ref.
2020 (9th)	Prithviraj Sukumaran	Ayyappanum Koshiyum	
2020 (9th)	Fahadh Faasil	Trance, C U Soon	
2020 (9th)	Tovino Thomas	Forensic	
2020 (9th)	Biju Menon	Ayyappanum Koshiyum	
2020 (9th)	Kunchacko Boban	Anjaam Pathiraa	
2021 (10th)	Tovino Thomas	Minnal Murali and Kala	
2021 (10th)	Biju Menon	Aarkkariyam	
2021 (10th)	Dulquer Salmaan	Kurup	
2021 (10th)	Jayasurya	Vellam	
2021 (10th)	Fahadh Faasil	Malik	
2021 (10th)	Joju George	Nayattu	
2022 (11th)	Tovino Thomas	Thallumaala	
2022 (11th)	Basil Joseph	Jaya Jaya Jaya Jaya Hey	
2022 (11th)	Mammootty	Bheeshma Parvam	
2022 (11th)	Nivin Pauly	Padavettu	
2022 (11th)	Prithviraj Sukumaran	Jana Gana Mana	
2023 (12th)	Tovino Thomas	2018	
2023 (12th)	Basil Joseph	Falimy, Kadina Kadoramee Andakadaham	
2023 (12th)	Joju George	Iratta	
2023 (12th)	Mammootty	Kaathal – The Core, Kannur Squad, Nanpakal Nerathu Mayakkam	
2023 (12th)	Mohanlal	Neru	
2023 (12th)	Suresh Gopi	Garudan	
2024 (13th)	Prithviraj Sukumaran	Aadujeevitham	
2024 (13th)	Asif Ali	Kishkindha Kaandam	
2024 (13th)	Fahadh Faasil	Aavesham	
2024 (13th)	Mammootty	Bramayugam	
2024 (13th)	Tovino Thomas	ARM	
2024 (13th)	Unni Mukundan	Marco	
2025 (14th)	Nivin Pauly	Sarvam Maya	
2025 (14th)	Naslen	Lokah Chapter 1: Chandra	
2025 (14th)	Mammootty	Kalamkaval	
2025 (14th)	Basil Joseph	Ponman	
2025 (14th)	Mohanlal	Thudarum	
2025 (14th)	Sandeep Pradeep	Eko	

== See also ==
- SIIMA for Best Actress – Malayalam
- SIIMA for Best Film – Malayalam
