= Premalu (soundtrack) =

2024 soundtrack album by Vishnu Vijay

- Soundtrack album cover

Soundtrack album by Vishnu Vijay
- Released: 16 February 2024
- Recorded: 2023–2024
- Studios: 2 BarQ Studios, Chennai
- Genre: Feature film soundtrack
- Length: 16:17
- Language: Malayalam
- Label: Bhavana Studios
- Producer: Vishnu Vijay

Vishnu Vijay chronology
Falimy (2023)	Premalu (2024)
External audio
- Audio Jukebox on YouTube

Singles from Premalu
- 1. "Chalo Hyderabad" Released: 27 November 2023; 2. "Kutty Kudiye" Released: 4 January 2024; 3. "Mini Maharani" Released: 25 January 2024; 4. "Telangana Bommalu" Released: 7 February 2024; 5. "Welcome To Hyderabad" Released: 11 February 2024

Premalu is the soundtrack to the 2024 film of the same name directed by Girish A. D. starring Naslen and Mamitha Baiju. Produced by Bhavana Studios, Fahadh Faasil and Friends and Working Class Hero, the film's musical score is composed by Vishnu Vijay and featured four songs written by Suhail Koya and an instrumental track. The soundtrack was released through Bhavana Studios on 16 February 2024.

== Album information ==
The soundtrack to the film featured five songs with all of them were released as singles. The first of them, the theme song, "Chalo Hyderabad" was released on 27 November 2023.

The second song "Kutty Kudiye" was released on 4 January 2024. It was performed by Sanjith Hegde, his first song in Malayalam. The third song "Mini Maharani" sung by Kapil Kapilan and Vagu Mazan, was released on 25 January. A lyrical video accompanied the song's release through YouTube which featured the making of the film in Hyderabad. The fourth song "Telangana Bommalu" was released on 7 February. The song was performed by veteran singer K. G. Markose, returning to playback singer in Malayalam film industry after a hiatus of two decades. The final song "Welcome To Hyderabad" was released on 11 February, two days after the film's premiere.

The film's soundtrack was released on 16 February 2024, followed by its dubbed Telugu and Tamil-dubbed versions on 9 and 13 March. Unlike the Malayalam and Tamil versions which were released through the production company Bhavana Studios, the Telugu version's soundtrack was released by Lahari Music.

== Track listing ==
=== Malayalam ===
All lyrics are written by Suhail Koya.

No.	Title	Singer(s)	Length
1.	"Chalo Hyderabad"	—	0:56
2.	"Kutty Kudiye"	Sanjith Hegde	3:04
3.	"Mini Maharani"	Kapil Kapilan, Vagu Mazan	4:05
4.	"Telangana Bommalu"	K. G. Markose	4:27
5.	"Welcome To Hyderabad"	Kapil Kapilan, Shakthisree Gopalan	3:42
Total length:			16:17

=== Telugu ===
All lyrics are written by Kittu Vissapragada.

No.	Title	Singer(s)	Length
1.	"Chitty Kudiye"	P V N S Rohit	3:06
2.	"Mini Maharani"	Aditya Iyengar, Manisha Eerabathini	4:07
3.	"Telangana Bommalu"	Vinayak	4:27
4.	"Welcome To Hyderabad"	Harika Narayan, Ritesh G. Rao	3:43
Total length:			15:23

=== Tamil ===
All lyrics are written by Naveen Bharathi.

No.	Title	Singer(s)	Length
1.	"Kutty Kudiye"	Sarath Santhosh	3:07
2.	"Mini Maharani"	Kapil Kapilan, Vagu Mazan	4:05
3.	"Telangana Bommalu"	Rakesh Brahmanandan	4:28
4.	"Welcome To Hyderabad"	Kapil Kapilan, Shakthisree Gopalan	3:42
Total length:			15:22

== Background score ==
Premalu

Film score by Vishnu Vijay
- Released: 5 April 2024
- Recorded: 2023–2024
- Studios: 2 BarQ Studios, Chennai
- Genre: Film score
- Length: 33:00
- Language: Malayalam
- Label: Bhavana Studios
- Producer: Vishnu Vijay
External audio
- Original Soundtrack on YouTube

A soundtrack consisting of 22 instrumental cues from the background score composed by Vishnu Vijay, was released by Bhavana Studios on 5 April 2024.

Premalu (Original Soundtrack)
No.	Title	Length
1.	"Palaniyappa College"	01:24
2.	"Anjali Rejects Sachin"	00:51
3.	"Reenu Joins The Company"	01:22
4.	"JK"	00:24
5.	"Love At First Sight"	00:40
6.	"Haldi Function"	01:08
7.	"Sachin Tries To Impress"	01:45
8.	"Sabash Bole"	01:25
9.	"Mindspace"	01:01
10.	"Next Sunday"	01:54
11.	"The Heart Break"	01:17
12.	"Burger Meal"	01:07
13.	"Ottamooli"	01:52
14.	"Insecurities"	00:56
15.	"Rejection"	01:28
16.	"Missing"	02:37
17.	"Engagement Party"	02:14
18.	"Aadhi and Pambavasan"	02:33
19.	"Sachin, I Love You"	00:39
20.	"Long Distance Relationship"	03:49
21.	"The Destiny"	01:38
22.	"Chalo Hyderabad"	00:56
Total length:		33:00

== Additional music ==
The duet song "Ya Ya Ya Yadava" sung by K. S. Chithra and P. Unnikrishnan from Devaraagam (1996), which was originally composed by M. M. Keeravani, was re-used in the film. The music video of the song was released by Sony Music India on 29 February 2024 subtitled as Devaraagam 2.0.

== Reception ==
S. R. Praveen of The Hindu and Princy Alexander of Manorama Online reviewed that Vishnu Vijay's music complimented the narration and a "huge plus" for the film. Anandu Suresh of The Indian Express wrote "Special mention goes to Vishnu Vijay’s music and songs, which perfectly complement the movie’s atmosphere, adding to its engaging quality throughout its runtime of over 150 minutes." Cris from The News Minute wrote "Music by Vishnu Vijay, through all the ups and downs of Premalu, at times has you nodding along, and at others, remains unnoticeable in the background."
