= The Goat Life (soundtrack) =

2024 soundtrack album by A. R. Rahman

Aadujeevitham
- Soundtrack album cover

Soundtrack album by A. R. Rahman
- Released: 17 March 2024
- Recorded: 2019–2024
- Studio: Panchathan Record Inn and AM Studios, Chennai; A. R. Studios, Mumbai; Panchathan Hollywood Studios, Los Angeles; KM Music Conservatory, Chennai; Firdaus Studio, Dubai; 20db Sound Studios, Chennai
- Genre: Feature film soundtrack
- Length: 28:45
- Language: Malayalam
- Label: Visual Romance Music
- Producer: A. R. Rahman

A. R. Rahman chronology
Lal Salaam (2024)	Aadujeevitham (2024)	Maidaan (2024)

The Goat Life is the soundtrack to the Malayalam-language survival drama film of the same name written, directed and co-produced by Blessy, and starred Prithviraj Sukumaran, which is an adaptation of the eponymous 2008 Malayalam novel by Benyamin. The six-song soundtrack composed by A. R. Rahman featured five songs with lyrics written by Rafeeq Ahamed and Rahman himself, along with an instrumental number. Vijay Yesudas, Chinmayi, Sana Moussa, Raja Hasan, Jithin Raj, Rakshita Suresh, Murtuza and Faiz Mustafa had also contributed vocals for the songs. The soundtrack was released on 17 March 2024 through Visual Romance Music.

== Background ==
Prithviraj recalled that he and Blessy discussed on finalizing the music director in 2009. Apart from Rahman, he also insisted to bring Hans Zimmer for composing the music, and eventually mailed the two composers. While Zimmer's manager claimed that he was open for a conversation with the director and actor, they also met Rahman and Blessy narrated the script for 30 minutes. After narration, he immediately agreed to be on board. Rahman's inclusion was not confirmed until a press interaction in Dubai in January 2018, where he disclosed on his involvement in the project.

It marked return to Malayalam cinema after having previously composed solely for Yoddha (1992). (Note: Albeit The Goat Life described as Rahman's return to Malayalam cinema, he also signed and composed music for Malayankunju (2022) during the intermittent delay in the film's production.) Rahman accepted the project because of the film's universal themes and Blessy's vision of how he adapted it. The latter admitted that Rahman's music would "capture the different emotional and spiritual levels of an isolated man" and the background score should be of an international standard. The film's music was considered as a blend of Arabic, Western and Indian musical genres.

== Production and composition ==
Rahman interviewed Rajive Cherian of The Jordan Times, during his visit to Amman where he disclosed that he had not yet commenced scoring the film but composed individual songs which were situational numbers, consisting of "lullaby, lament-like" numbers in addition to a romantic song. He also said that during his involvement in the project, he was intended to compose only one song for the film but had curated three to four songs.

Rafeeq Ahamed wrote the lyrics for most of the songs after the tunes were composed, which he considered to be "unconventional". Due to COVID-19 pandemic, Ahamed and Blessy, through virtual interactions, discussed about the lyrics and emotional weight and the former extracted his ideas and the kind of songs Blessy wanted. He wanted to capture two different emotions in the film: one being Najeeb's loneliness and hopelessness in the desserts and the hope in his life.

During the composing sessions, Blessy asked Rahman to compose an emotional number which Rahman did after Ahamed sent him the lyrics. However, as Rahman felt the song need more emotional weight, he came up with another tune which became "Periyone". The first two lines of the song were penned by Rahman. Jithin Raj performed vocals for the song; he previously lent the vocals for the dubbed Malayalam versions of Rahman's compositions of Kaatru Veliyidai, Mom (2017) and Ponniyin Selvan: I (2022). This was his first original work for Rahman. Blessy did not want the song to be musical as it is about Najeeb's struggle and wanted to highlight the emotions in the song. After few corrections, Raj recorded the vocals for its dubbed versions.

In November 2019, Rahman recorded the film's first song (later deciphered as "Omane") with Vijay Yesudas, whose visuals had been shot for it. Chinmayi, however, recorded the female vocals of the song in March 2018. Rakshita Suresh performed the background vocals for the song, in her Malayalam debut as a singer. Palestinian singer Sanaa Moussa performed the folk song "Badaweih" who recorded her vocals in Israel before the 2023 Gaza war ceasefire.

== Marketing ==
At the film's official website launch on late-February 2024, Rahman disclosed that the film's music launch would be held on 10 March 2024. The event was held at the Adlux Convention Center in Angamaly with entry provided only through invitations. Along with the film's cast and crew, the event saw the attendance of actors Mohanlal, Tovino Thomas, Roshan Mathew, Rajisha Vijayan, and veteran directors Sathyan Anthikad, Jayaraj, Rajeev Anchal. Rahman and his musical team conducted a live performance of the film's songs.

=== Promotional single ===
A promotional video of "Hope Song" was screened during the music launch event and released to social media platforms on that day. It was shot entirely in Kochi during late-February and early-March 2024, which was co-directed by Rathish Ambat and Blessy, featuring Rahman, Rianjali Bhowmick and Paris Laxmi. The video also includes snippets from the film.

Rahman and Bhowmick performed and co-wrote the lyrics in English language, while Ahamed, Prasoon Joshi, Vivek, Ramajogayya Sastry and Jayanth Kaikini wrote the Malayalam, Hindi, Tamil, Telugu and Kannada lyrics. The single version was uploaded to streaming platforms on 13 March 2024.

No.	Title	Lyrics	Singer(s)	Length
1.	"Hope Song"	Rafeeq Ahamed, Prasoon Joshi, Vivek, Ramajogayya Sastry, Jayanth Kaikini, A. R. Rahman, Rianjali Bhowmick	A. R. Rahman, Rianjali Bhowmick	3:39

=== Music video ===
The music video for the song "Periyone" was released on 20 March 2024. It features visuals of Rahman in the dunes, giving an introductory narration, regarding the song along with snippets from the film. Compared to the actual five-and-half-minute duration of the audio song, the video runs for four minutes and 58 seconds.

== Track listing ==
The five-song soundtrack was not released on the date of the film's music launch event. Instead, the album was eventually released on 17 March 2024.

=== Malayalam ===
No.	Title	Lyrics	Singer(s)	Length
1.	"Omane"	Rafeeq Ahamed	Vijay Yesudas, Chinmayi Sripaada, Rakshita Suresh	5:59
2.	"Periyone"	Rafeeq Ahamed	Jithin Raj	5:24
3.	"Benevolent Breeze"	—	Instrumental	5:21
4.	"Badaweih — Palestinian Folk Song"	Traditional	Sanaa Moussa	6:43
5.	"Istighfar"	A. R. Rahman	Raja Hasan, Murtuza Mustafa, Faiz Mustafa	5:18
Total length:				28:45

=== Hindi ===
No.	Title	Lyrics	Singer(s)	Length
1.	"Khatti Si Woh Imli"	Prasoon Joshi	Armaan Malik, Chinmayi Sripaada, Rakshita Suresh	5:59
2.	"Meherbaan O Rahman"	Prasoon Joshi	Jithin Raj	5:24
3.	"Benevolent Breeze"	—	Instrumental	5:21
4.	"Badaweih — Palestinian Folk Song"	Traditional	Sanaa Moussa	6:43
5.	"Istighfar"	A. R. Rahman	Raja Hasan, Murtuza Mustafa, Faiz Mustafa	5:18
Total length:				28:45

=== Tamil ===
No.	Title	Lyrics	Singer(s)	Length
1.	"Pathikatha Thee"	Snehan	Vijay Yesudas, Chinmayi Sripaada, Rakshita Suresh	5:59
2.	"Periyone"	Mashook Rahman	Jithin Raj	5:24
3.	"Benevolent Breeze"	—	Instrumental	5:21
4.	"Badaweih — Palestinian Folk Song"	Traditional	Sanaa Moussa	6:43
5.	"Istighfar"	A. R. Rahman	Raja Hasan, Murtuza Mustafa, Faiz Mustafa	5:18
Total length:				28:45

=== Telugu ===
No.	Title	Lyrics	Singer(s)	Length
1.	"Sarasa Raaga Kilikinchita"	Rakendu Mouli	Vijay Yesudas, Chinmayi Sripaada, Rakshita Suresh	5:59
2.	"Tejame Rahmaaney"	Rakendu Mouli	Jithin Raj	5:24
3.	"Benevolent Breeze"	—	Instrumental	5:21
4.	"Badaweih — Palestinian Folk Song"	Traditional	Sanaa Moussa	6:43
5.	"Istighfar"	A. R. Rahman	Raja Hasan, Murtuza Mustafa, Faiz Mustafa	5:18
Total length:				28:45

=== Kannada ===
No.	Title	Lyrics	Singer(s)	Length
1.	"Mandada Tumba"	Pavan K. B.	Vijay Yesudas, Chinmayi Sripaada, Rakshita Suresh	5:59
2.	"Belake Nee Rahmaaney"	Pavan K. B.	Jithin Raj	5:24
3.	"Benevolent Breeze"	—	Instrumental	5:21
4.	"Badaweih — Palestinian Folk Song"	Traditional	Sanaa Moussa	6:43
5.	"Istighfar"	A. R. Rahman	Raja Hasan, Murtuza Mustafa, Faiz Mustafa	5:18
Total length:				28:45

== Background score ==
The Goat Life (Original Background Score)

Film score by A. R. Rahman
- Released: 13 April 2024
- Recorded: 2022–2024
- Genre: Film score
- Length: 14:16
- Language: Malayalam
- Label: Visual Romance Music
- Producer: A. R. Rahman

The film further featured five songs in the background score, that was released as a separate album on 13 April 2024.

No.	Title	Length
1.	"King Of Kerala"	1:56
2.	"Friendship"	2:48
3.	"Mirage"	4:12
4.	"The Beloved"	3:01
5.	"The Train of Dreams"	2:19
Total length:		14:16

== Reception ==
The soundtrack received positive reviews from music listeners. Vipin Nair of Music Aloud rated three-and-a-half out of five stars assigning that the soundtrack "sees two of the most poignant sufi pieces he has created in quite some time". S. Devasankar of Pinkvilla wrote "The music imbibes the melancholy in Najeeb’s life to the audience, while at the same time, carrying an aura of divinity, something that helped the protagonist carry on through circumstances that were nothing short of hell."

Princy Alexander of Manorama Online attributed that Rahman's music "captures the film's essence". Nirmal Jovial of The Week added that "Periyone" and "Badaweih" were "intelligently placed" and further wrote "While the background score generally meets expectations [...] certain segments, particularly those portraying moments of hope by the end of the film, lack the emotional resonance one would expect." Janani K. of India Today wrote "AR Rahman is the other pillar that holds fort. His background score and songs evoke emotions."

S. R. Praveen of The Hindu wrote "AR Rahman, in his rare work for a Malayalam movie, comes up with a soundtrack that suits the theme and setting, with ‘Periyone’ and its various iterations being the high points." Latha Srinivasan of Hindustan Times wrote "Music maestro AR Rahman has elevated the film to another level with background score [...] In effect, Rahman’s background music makes you connect emotionally with this hard-hitting survival drama, right from the Kerala backwaters to the fierce desert sandstorms and the loud winds, to the grief and loss Najeeb experiences." However, Anandu Suresh of The Indian Express criticised Rahman's music as it "felt discordant with the emotions portrayed and aside from 'Periyone', the songs too failed to evoke any feelings or enhance the rich visual storytelling".

== Accolades ==
Lists the award received for the soundtrack album of the film, irrespective of the date of the award ceremony.

Month Year	Name of Award	Category	Recipient	Status	Reference
November 2024	Hollywood Music in Media Awards	Best Song from a Feature Film - "Periyone"	A. R. Rahman	Nominated	
November 2024	Hollywood Music in Media Awards	Won	A. R. Rahman	Nominated	
Best Score for an Independent Film (Foreign Language)
August 2024	Kerala State Film Awards	Best Sound Mixing	Resul Pookutty Sharath Mohan	Won	
