= Aavesham (soundtrack) =

2024 film soundtrack album

- Soundtrack album cover

Soundtrack album by Sushin Shyam
- Released: 19 April 2024
- Recorded: 2024
- Venues: Kochi; Chennai; London
- Studios: Sonic Island; Soundtown; MLounge; Legato Records; West Eleven
- Genre: Feature film soundtrack
- Length: 24:22
- Language: Malayalam
- Label: Think Music
- Producer: Sushin Shyam

Sushin Shyam chronology
Manjummel Boys (2024)	Aavesham (2024)	Ullozhukku (2024)

Singles from Aavesham
- 1. "Jaada" Released: 27 February 2024; 2. "Galatta" Released: 13 March 2024; 3. "Illuminati" Released: 28 March 2024; 4. "Mathapithakkale" Released: 14 April 2024

Aavesham is the soundtrack to the 2024 film of the same name directed by Jithu Madhavan starring Fahadh Faasil. The soundtrack consisted of nine songs composed by Sushin Shyam with lyrics primarily written by Vinayak Sasikumar. The album was released by Think Music on 19 April 2024.

== Development ==
Aavesham is Shyam's second collaboration with Madhavan after Romancham (2023) and fifth with Fahadh after Varathan (2018), Kumbalangi Nights (2019), Trance (2020) and Malik (2021). Like Romancham, the film consisted of upbeat rap numbers which would appear as montages. According to Shyam, the film's musical soundscape drew inspiration from the compositions of Anirudh Ravichander due to its upbeat nature.

Shyam had collaborated with several independent musicians for providing vocals to the songs, which included the music band Malayali Monkeys, rapper-songwriters Dabzee, Hanumankind, Munz, MC Couper and Chennai-based rapper Paal Dabba. In addition, to this Sreenath Bhasi, Nazriya Nazim, Vipin Raveendran and Pranavam Sasi also performed vocals for few songs. Bhasi was roped for the song "Jaada", as Shyam felt that his vocals would complement the song very well.

== Marketing and release ==
"Jaada" sung by Bhasi was the first to be released from the album, on 27 February 2024. The second song "Galatta" sung by Paal Dabba was later released on 13 March. The song "Illuminati" was performed by Dabzee at the film's promotional event at Union Christian College, Aluva on 26 March. Two days later, the song was released as a single in music streaming platforms, while the lyrical video was released in YouTube a week later. The fourth single "Mathapithakkale" was released after the film's premiere, on 14 April, coinciding with Vishu.

== Track listing ==
The track list of the film's soundtrack was unveiled on 10 April 2024, prior to the film's release. The album was released on 19 April 2024.

No.	Title	Lyrics	Singer(s)	Length
1.	"Mathapithakkale"	Vinayak Sasikumar, MC Couper	Malayali Monkeys, MC Couper	3:29
2.	"Adholokam"	Vinayak Sasikumar	Vipin Raveendran	3:39
3.	"Thurupu Cheetu"	Vinayak Sasikumar	Munz, Sushin Shyam	1:36
4.	"Galatta"	Vinayak Sasikumar	Paal Dabba, Sushin Shyam	2:10
5.	"The Last Dance"	Hanumankind	Hanumankind	1:23
6.	"Odimaga"	Vinayak Sasikumar	Sushin Shyam, Nazriya Nazim	2:51
7.	"Jaada"	Vinayak Sasikumar	Sreenath Bhasi	2:43
8.	"Armadham"	Vinayak Sasikumar	Pranavam Sasi	2:53
9.	"Illuminati"	Vinayak Sasikumar	Dabzee	3:33
Total length:				24:22

== Background Score ==
Aavesham

Film score by Sushin Shyam
- Released: 1 June 2024
- Recorded: 2024
- Studio: Rottenbiller Hall
- Genre: film score
- Length: 32:20
- Language: Malayalam
- Label: Think Music
- Producers: Sushin Shyam; Sathwik Prasanth; Nivin Raphael; Nezer Ahemed

Sushin Shyam chronology
Manjummel Boys (2024)	Aavesham (2024)	Ullozhukku (2024)
External audio
- Aavesham - Original Score on YouTube

The background score is composed by Sushin Shyam.

== Controversy ==
Bishop Joseph Karayil had made criticism against the song Illuminati that the lyrics of the song is anti-christian.

== Reception ==
Vishal Menon of Film Companion South and Latha Srinivasan of Hindustan Times described the soundtrack as "solid", "trendy" and "hip". Janani K. of India Today wrote that Shyam's music "adds beauty to the wild ride". Anandu Suresh of The Indian Express wrote that the musical score elevated the film and "give the film the mass masala vibe it demands" and further wrote "Without overusing any particular tune, Sushin adeptly switches between the ones he has created, providing a cohesive viewing experience." S. R. Praveen of The Hindu wrote Shyam's "pulsating score somewhat papers over the film's many weaknesses". Rohit Panicker of Times Now wrote "The soundtrack and songs by Sushin Shyam add to the quirkiness and boisterousness of the film". Vignesh Madhu of The New Indian Express also reviewed "Sushin Shyam's music is loud, fun, and packed with energy—perfectly in sync with the film's zippy mood" but was critical of the placement of the song "Illuminati" in the closing credits.
