= Moorane Krishnappa =

- Theatrical release poster
- Directed by: Naveen Narayanghatta
- Written by: Naveen Narayanghatta
- Produced by: Mohan Reddy G Ravishankar
- Starring: Rangayana Raghu; Sampath Maitreya; Sripriya; Ugramm Manju; Tukali Santosh
- Cinematography: Yogi
- Edited by: Shrikanth Gowda
- Music by: Anand Rajavikram; Suprith Sharma S
- Production company: Red Dragon Films
- Distributed by: KRG Studios
- Release date: 24 May 2024
- Running time: 141 minutes
- Language: Kannada

Moorane Krishnappa (transl. Third Krishnappa) is a 2024 Indian Kannada-language comedy drama film written and directed by Naveen Narayanaghatta. The film is produced by Naveen Reddy G under Red Dragon Films banner. The film stars Rangayana Raghu and Sampath Maitreya in lead roles while Sripriya, Ugramm Manju, Tukali Santosh play supporting characters. The film has cinematography by Yogi, editing by Shrikanth Gowda and music by Anand Rajavikram and Suprith Sharma S.

The film is set in a rural backdrop with South Karnataka especially Anekal and Kolar Kannada slang spoken in the film. The film was released on 24 May 2024.

== Plot ==
Veeranna, a local politician aiming for re-election, constructs a Ganesha temple to win back the trust of his village, Narayangatta. The planned celebrity inauguration takes a tragic turn when the chosen celebrity dies suddenly. As the village grapples with shock, the focus shifts to finding a suitable replacement for the inauguration. Teacher Krishnappa suggests his Bangalore friend Nandish, who promises Chief Minister attendance. The village embraces this hope, making Krishnappa a local hero. The story unfolds as the village eagerly anticipates the inauguration, raising questions about the Chief Minister's involvement and the possibility of a scam.

== Cast ==
- Rangayana Raghu as Veeranna, President
- Sampath Maitreya as Krishnappa
- Sripriya as Shashi, Veeranna's Daughter
- Ugramm Manju as Loki
- Tukali Santosh as Raghu
- Aarohi Narayan (cameo appearance)

== Soundtrack ==
Moorne Krishnappa

Soundtrack album by Anand Rajavikram Suprith Sharma S
- Released: 2024
- Recorded: 2023–2024
- Genre: Soundtrack
- Length: 8:39
- Label: Anand Audio
- Producers: Mohan Reddy G Ravishankar

The songs and background score of the film is composed by duo of Anand Rajavikram and Suprith Sharma S.

Track list
No.	Title	Lyrics	Music	Singer(s)	Length
1.	"Bagehariyada Ogatugalu"	Suprith Sharma	Suprith Sharma	Nihal Tauro	4:40
2.	"Honganase"	Suprith Sharma	Anand Rajavikram	Surabhi Bharadwaj, Chethan Gandharva	3:59
Total length:					8:39

== Release ==
=== Theatrical ===
The film was released theatrically on 24 May 2024 across Karnataka.

== Reception ==
The film opened to positive reviews with praise towards the storytelling, acting and the nativity of the film.

Shashiprasad SM of Times Now rated the film 3.5/5 stars and wrote "It is a fun-filled laughter riot but deep within, Moorane Krishnappa has a larger message that throws light on electoral politics and the much-needed change in the mindset of our representatives." Swaroop Kodur in his review for Film Companion described the film as "A Delightful Comedy that rises beyond its occasional slip-ups".

Prathiba Joy of OTTPlay rated the film 3.5/5 and in her review wrote "Director Naveen Narayanaghatta presents a fun tale set in a quaint village with a simple narrative that's a delight to watch." Pranati AS reviewing for Deccan Herald rated the film 3.5 out of 5 stars and wrote "A rib-tickling fable with winning performances" with her appreciation towards the actors, cinematography, music and Direction.

Vivek MV of The Hindu in his review wrote "With its quirky, relatable comedy powered by gifted actors, Naveen Narayanaghatta's 'Moorane Krishnappa' is a delightful watch from start to finish." Reviewing for Cinema Express, A Sharadhaa wrote "Moorane Krishnappa is a carefully crafted piece of work by Naveen Reddy, with screenplay and dialogue adding flavour to the story alongside plenty of laugh-out-loud moments."

Y Maheshwara Reddy for Bangalore Mirror termed the film "Emotional & suspenseful." Pramod Mohan Hegde in his review for The Times of India rated the film 3.5 out of 5 stars and wrote "The film is not without its flaws, but elevated performances, laced with delectable language, make this a must watch."
