= Max (2024 film) =

2024 Kannada-language film by Vijay Karthikeyaa

- Theatrical release poster
- Directed by: Vijay Karthikeyaa
- Written by: Vijay Karthikeyaa
- Produced by: Kalaippuli S. Thanu; Sudeepa
- Starring: Sudeepa; Varalaxmi Sarathkumar; Sunil; Sukrutha Wagle
- Cinematography: Shekhar Chandra
- Edited by: S. R. Ganesh Baabu
- Music by: B. Ajaneesh Loknath
- Production companies: V Creations; Kichcha Creatiions
- Distributed by: KRG Studios
- Release date: 25 December 2024
- Running time: 133 minutes
- Country: India
- Language: Kannada
- Box office: ₹60–62 crore

Max is a 2024 Indian Kannada-language action thriller film directed by debutant Vijay Karthikeyaa and jointly produced by Kalaippuli S. Thanu under V Creations and Sudeepa under Kichcha Creations. Alongside producing the film, Sudeepa also plays the titular role, alongside an ensemble cast of Varalaxmi Sarathkumar, Sunil, Samyukta Hornad, Sukrutha Wagle and Anirudh Bhat. The music is composed by B. Ajaneesh Loknath, while cinematography and editing were handled by Shekar Chandra and S. R. Ganesh Baabu.

Max was theatrically released on 25 December 2024, coinciding with Christmas in Kannada, alongside Tamil, Telugu and Malayalam languages. It emerged as the highest grossing Kannada film of 2024.

== Plot ==
Inspector Arjun Mahakshay (a.k.a Max) must clear his name after the local minister's sons Michael and Veera get killed in the police station where Max works in after getting suspended for an unknown reason. He lies to the commissioner and tries to bury the bodies with the help of the other constables and inspectors (which is shown in first half of film). In second half of the film, it is shown that Max, along with the other police officers, kill all of the minister's men.

== Cast ==
- Sudeepa as CI Arjun Mahakshay "Max"
- Varalaxmi Sarathkumar as CID Inspector Roopa
- Sunil as Ganesh "Gani"
- Ilavarasu as Head Constable Ravanan
- Ugramm Manju as Constable Das
- Samyukta Hornad as Inspector B. Aarathi
- Sukrutha Wagle as Constable Meena
- Sudha Belawadi as Arjun’s Mother
- Sharath Lohithaswa as Minister Parashuram
- Vamsi Krishna as Narasimha
- Aadukalam Naren as Minister Daniel
- Pramod Shetty as Devraj, local corporator
- Redin Kingsley as Sebastian
- Anirudh Bhat as Michael, Minister's Son
- Vijay Chendoor as Constable Govind
- Govinda Gowda as Constable Lurdh
- Kamaraju
- Karan Arya

== Production ==
=== Pre-production ===
Sudeepa officially announced his collaboration with Kalaipuli S. Thanu in May 2023, almost a year after his previous release of Vikrant Rona. A teaser of was released in July 2023, where it was revealed that it would be directed by debutant Vijay Karthikeyaa and music will be composed by B. Ajaneesh Loknath. Samyukta Hornad and Sukrutha Wagle were reported to be part of the cast, which was later confirmed by the team. Later it was also reported that Varalaxmi Sarathkumar, who was last paired with Sudeepa in Maanikya, is also in the film.

=== Filming ===
The film went on floors in the month of July 2023. Majority of the film was shot in and around Mahabalipuram. While Chethan D'Souza composed most of the action sequences, It was also reported that Kevin Kumar of Jailer fame had also shot an action sequence. While the shooting of the film was underway, the film faced the wrath of Chennai Floods, which meant the shooting was halted. The shooting began and the action sequences were wrapped up in May 2024.

== Soundtrack ==
Max

Soundtrack album by B. Ajaneesh Loknath
- Released: 13 January 2025
- Recorded: 2024
- Genre: Soundtrack
- Length: 10:08
- Label: Saregama
- Producer: B. Ajaneesh Loknath

There were many big names being considered for the film, but B. Ajaneesh Loknath, who had previously collaborated with Sudeepa in Vikrant Rona, was selected to compose music for the film. The first single, titled "Maximum Mass", released on 2 September 2024, coinciding with Sudeepa's 52nd birthday. The second single, titled "Lion's Roar", released on 15 December 2024.

Track list
No.	Title	Lyrics	Singer(s)	Length
1.	"Maximum Mass"	Anup Bhandari, M.C. Bijju	Chethan Gandharva, M.C. Bijju	2:26
2.	"Lion's Roar"	Anup Bhandari	Vijay Prakash	2:27
3.	"Hot'tu Mamma"	Anup Bhandari	Nakash Aziz, Aishwarya Rangarajan	3:03
4.	"The Hunter Song"	Nagarjun Sharma, Amogh Balaji	Aniruddha Sastry, Amogh Balaji	2:12

== Marketing ==
The film's initial teaser was released on 2 July 2023 by an announcement from the makers. Later, on the occasion of Sudeepa's birthday the film's title MAX was revealed. The official teaser was subsequently released in Kannada, alongside Tamil, Telugu, Hindi and Malayalam languages on 16 July 2024. The trailer was later released on 22 December 2024.

== Release ==
=== Home media ===
The satellite rights were sold to Zee Kannada for ₹28 crores. The film began streaming on ZEE5 from 15 February 2025 in Kannada and dubbed versions of Tamil, Telugu and Malayalam languages.

== Reception ==
=== Critical reception ===
A. Sharadhaa of Cinema Express gave the film three-and-a-half out of five stars and wrote, "Director Vijay Kartikeyan’s approach to Max is one of precision and urgency. He sticks to the tight timeline of a single night, unraveling backstories swiftly without wasting time on exposition. There’s no room for unnecessary emotional beats." Shashiprasad SM of Times Now gave it three-and-a-half out of five stars and wrote, "Packed with nearly a dozen full-on action sequences, Max is a no-nonsense film visually designed for die-hard action fans. There is no melodrama, as it delivers pure adrenaline-fueled entertainment from start to finish."

Sunayana Suresh of The South First gave it three-and-a-half out of five stars and wrote, "Max is that typical commercial entertainer that fans want, where they see their superstar in all the glory with dialogues and action sequences galore. And this Christmas, Santa Claus has delivered exactly that to Kichcha fans." Y. Maheswara Reddy of Bangalore Mirror gave it three-and-a-half out of five stars and noted that "Though the movie takes its own time in the pre-intermission session to gain momentum, the apt narration of the screenplay keeps the audiences on the edges of their seats."

Sridevi S. of The Times of India gave it three-and-a-half out of five stars and wrote, "Since the movie features actors from across South film industries, Kannada dubbing seems a bit off. But the racy screenplay, coupled with Sudeep’s charming onscreen presence makes up for it. For an action film, the dialogues could’ve been better. There is no punch dialogue for fans to take home. The movie also lacks a strong villain with a character arc." Sanjay Ponnappa of India Today gave it three out of five stars and wrote, "While Max leans heavily on Kichcha Sudeep’s star power, its sharp screenplay and brisk pacing elevate it beyond the realm of a typical commercial entertainer. The film strikes a balance between mass appeal and an engaging narrative."

Avinash Ramachandran of The Indian Express gave it three out of five stars and wrote, "The Vijay Karthikeyaa film, headlined by Sudeep, is a throwback to the films of not-so yore where our stars were saviours, and superstars were gods." Vivek M. V. of The Hindu wrote, "The core idea of Max might remind you of Lokesh Kanagaraj’s Kaithi (2019). With so much happening in a short span of time, it’s tough to emotionally invest in the proceedings. On the other hand, Max’s racy screenplay keeps you curious about the events on screen. A superb fusion of Chethan D'Souza’s action choreography and Ajaneesh Lokanath’s ensures an adrenaline-pumping experience."

Varun Keval of The Hans India wrote, "Max is an action-packed movie with suspense. It is different because it doesn’t focus much on emotions. Instead, it keeps the action and drama exciting. The direction is good, and the story moves quickly." Swaroop Kodur of The Hollywood Reporter India wrote, "All in all, Max treads briskly and assuredly at a 132-minute runtime and dispenses some fun and thrills along the way. But it required a lot more agency in terms of writing to deliver a film worthy of the setup and lead actor’s screen allure."

Pranati A. S. of Deccan Herald gave it two-and-a-half out of five stars and opined that "Debutant director Vijay Karthikeyaa brings a different kind of story to Kannada audiences. A fast-paced thriller like Max provides ample scope for music, but Ajaneesh Loknath’s score fails to impress. Regardless of the drawbacks, Max provides wholesome entertainment." B. V. S. Prakash of Deccan Chronicle wrote, "Sudeep tasted success with the spooky thriller Vikrant Rona and now returns as a suspended cop but quite fearless and invincible. He carries the film on his shoulders and does it well. Varalakshmi Sarathkumar plays a cop with ‘dark’ shades, while Sunil’s role is poorly-etched."

=== Box Office ===
The film collected ₹8.50 crore on the opening day which was the highest for a Kannada movie released in 2024. The film earned ₹4 crore on second day taking its total collection to ₹12.70 crore. The estimated gross at the end of 3 days was ₹15.63 crores to ₹16 crores. The movie was reported to have grossed ₹22.25 crores within 6 days of release. Over six day long extended weekend, the total collection of the film stood at ₹35 crore. The movie was reported to have grossed ₹45 crores in 10 days. The movie collected ₹62 crores in little over two weeks and emerged as the highest grossing Kannada movie of 2024.
