= Upadhyaksha =

- Theatrical release poster
- Directed by: Anil Kumar
- Story by: Anil Kumar
- Produced by: Smitha Umapathy
- Starring: Chikkanna
- Cinematography: Shekhar Chandra
- Edited by: K M Prakash
- Music by: Arjun Janya
- Production companies: DN Cinemas; Umapathy Films
- Distributed by: Umapathy Films
- Release date: 26 January 2024
- Country: India
- Language: Kannada
- Box office: ₹8.05–10 crore

Upadhyaksha (transl. Vice President) is a 2024 Kannada-language comedy drama film directed by Anil Kumar and produced by Smitha Umapathy. It stars Chikkanna in his debut male lead role. The rest of the cast includes Malaika Vasupal, P. Ravishankar, Sadhu Kokila, Veena Sundar and Dharmanna Kadur. The film is a sequel to Adyaksha (2014) starring Sharan in the lead role.

Upadhyaksha was theatrically released in India on 26 January 2024, coinciding the Indian Republic Day, and received positive reviews from critics.

== Plot ==
The film is about a villager, Narayana, who is the vice president of "Chi-Thu" sangha and refuses to get promoted to the president place because of his affection towards the current president. He is at loggerheads with Shiva Rudregowda, the village head. The story revolves around events unfolding in Gejjepura village in Mandya district when Shivarudregowda's youngest daughter Anjali falls in love with Narayana, who has to work as a slave in her house in lieu of loan taken by his father.

== Cast ==
- Chikkanna as Narayana
- Malaika Vasupal as Anjali
- P. Ravishankar as Shiva Rudregowda
- Sadhu Kokila
- Veena Sundar
- Kari Subbu
- Dharmanna Kadur
- Keerthiraj
- Sharan as Adhyaksha Chandrashekar Gowda (cameo appearance)

== Production ==
=== Filming ===
The principal photography of film went on floors on 17 July 2022 in Mandya followed by an extensive shoot in Mysore and scheduled to release in February 2023. However it was pushed to January 2024 later.

== Music ==
The music of the film is composed by Arjun Janya. The first single titled "Nanage Neenu" was released in November 2023.

Track list
No.	Title	Lyrics	Singer(s)	Length
1.	"Nanage Neenu"	A. P. Arjun	Vijay Prakash, Rakshita Suresh	3:52
2.	"Hattri Nandu Super Scooter"	Chethan Kumar	Chikkanna, Shivani Naveen	4:15
3.	"Upadhyaksha Title Track"	Chethan Kumar	Vyasaraj Sosale

== Release ==
=== Theatrical ===
Upadhyaksha was theatrically released in India on 26 January 2024, coinciding the Indian Republic Day, and received positive reviews from critics.

=== Home media ===
The movie digital right was acquired by Sun NXT and started premiered on 8th March 2024.The movie satellite rights was acquired by Udaya TV.

== Reception ==
=== Critical response ===
Vinay Lokesh of The Times of India gave 3/5 stars and praised Chikkanna's performance saying "Chikkanna stands out in his performance as Narayana in his first film as a lead. He sticks to his strengths which are comedy, one-liners and humorous conversation, which he manages to deliver by making the audience laugh their heart out" Sujay B. M. of Deccan Herald gave 3/5 stars and wrote "The film's biggest selling point is its organic connection to its prequel. A few flashback scenes bolster that link. The punchlines by Chandra Mohan infuse slapstick comedy, with Sadhu Kokila's comic presence and exaggerations entertaining the audience further"

A. Sharadhaa of The New Indian Express gave 3/5 stars and wrote "While labeled as a sequel, Upadhyaksha successfully maintains the essence of the original while carving its unique identity." Shashiprasad of South First gave 3/5 stars and wrote "The biggest takeaway is the narration of the characters, which is a continuation of the original script. There is no exaggeration, excessive heroism or unwanted scenes that can easily put one off when making the shift as the lead actor."
