= Bheema (2024 film) =

Indian Kannada-language action thriller film

- Directed by: Vijay Kumar
- Screenplay by: Vijay Kumar
- Dialogues by: Maasthi Upparahall
- Story by: Vijay Kumar
- Produced by: Krishna Sarthak; Jagadeesh Gowda
- Starring: Duniya Vijay; Ashwini; Dragon Manju; Kalyani Raju
- Cinematography: Shiva Sena
- Edited by: Deepu S. Kumar
- Music by: Charan Raj
- Production companies: Jagadeesh Films; Krishna Creations
- Release date: August 9, 2024
- Country: India
- Language: Kannada
- Budget: ₹8-10 crore
- Box office: ₹29.2 crore

Bheema is a 2024 Kannada-language action thriller film directed by Vijay Kumar (Duniya Vijay) and produced by Krishna Creations and Jagadeesh Films. The film stars himself alongside Ashwini, Black Dragon Manju, Gili Gili Chandru, Rangayana Raghu, Achyuth Kumar, Gopalkrishna Deshpande and Ramesh Indira. The music was composed by Charan Raj, while the cinematography and editing were handled by Shiva Sena and Deepu S. Kumar.

The film was officially launched on 18 April 2022. Bheema was released on 9 August 2024 to mixed reviews from critics, yet it became commercially successful.

== Plot ==
Bheema wages a war against Dragon Manju, an aspiring politician and drug dealer, for supplying drugs in his locality and making the youngsters to become drug addicts.

== Cast ==
- Duniya Vijay as Bheema and Salaga (cameo appearance)
- Ashwini as Ashwini
- Kalyani Raju as Baby Amma
- Dragon Manju as Black Dragon Manju
- Cockroach Sudhi as Shunti
- Achyuth Kumar as "Java" Ramanna
- Rangayana Raghu
- Ramesh Indira as MLA
- Gopalkrishna Deshpande as Allu
- Gili Gili Chandru as Gili Gili Chandru
- Priya Shatamarshan as Inspector Girija

== Soundtrack ==
Bheema

Soundtrack album by Charan Raj
- Released: 2024
- Recorded: 2024
- Genre: Feature film soundtrack
- Length: 9:29
- Label: Anand Audio
- Producer: Charan Raj

Charan Raj chronology
Somu Sound Engineer (2024)	Bheema (2024)

The music was composed by Charan Raj in his second collaboration with Duniya Vijay after Salaga.

Track listing
No.	Title	Lyrics	Artist(s)	Length
1.	"Bad Boys"	Rahul Dito; MC Bijju; Nagarjun Sharma	Rahul Dito; MC Bijju	2:45
2.	"I Love U Kane"	Kaviraj	Charan Raj; Vaish	4:14
3.	"Noorupayi Mix"	MC Bijju	MC Bijju; Charan Raj	2:30
4.	"Don't Worry Baby Chinnamma"	Nagarjun Sharma	Gana Muthu	3:42
5.	"Boom Boom Bengaluru"	Girijana Samagra Abhirudhi Kala Samsthe	JG Kumara; Girijana Samagra Abhirudhi Kala Samsthe	3:29
6.	"Aadi Baa Magane Bheema"	Nagarjun Sharma	Charan Raj	3:11
7.	"Bittu Hodeya"	Arasu Anthare	Naveen Sajju	3:20
Total length:				21:19

== Release ==
Bheema was released on 9 August 2024. digital rights bagged by Amazon prime

== Reception ==
=== Critical response ===
S. Sridevi of The Times of India gave 3/5 stars and wrote "Bheema, Vijay Kumar’s directorial after Salaga, is written for a mass audience and he has been clear about it from the get go." A. Sharadhaa of The New Indian Express gave 3/5 stars and wrote "The film’s raw style of direction combined with Charan Raj’s intense soundtrack contribute to a powerful and visceral experience." Y. Maheshwar Reddy of Bangalore Mirror gave 2.5/5 stars and wrote that the film is "worth a watch, but not for families." Shashiprasad SM of Times Now gave 2.5/5 stars and wrote "Despite a promising first half and a strong social message, Bheema ultimately falls short, succumbing to a predictable storyline and typical drama, leaving viewers disappointed by the end." Sujay B. M of Deccan Herald gave 2/5 stars and wrote "While Duniya Vijay fans may like the masala film because it is packed with drugs and smeared with blood, others will lose very little by skipping it." Pratibha Joy of OTTplay gave 1.5/5 stars and wrote "Bheema has been made for audiences who are okay with mindless action, dialogues and counter-dialogues, with some objectification of women thrown in, for good measure." Vivek M. V of The Hindu wrote "Directed by and starring Vijay in the lead, ‘Bheema’ partially manages to be a typical commercial entertainer successfully conveying a noble message."

=== Box office ===
Though rumoured to have collected ₹10 crore on first day, trackers estimated the first day gross to be ₹3.95 crore and was reported to have collected ₹3.4 crore on second day and ₹3.8 crore on third day. The first weekend collection was reported to be between ₹11.15 crore (net) to ₹11.65 crore (gross). The net collections by the end of fourth day was reported to be ₹12.85 crores. It had collected ₹1.3 crore on fifth day. While the gross collection for 5 days was reported be ₹14.30 crore, the net collections at the end of 6 days was reported to be ₹15.15 crore. The first week collections were reported to be ₹17.38 crore. The 10 days gross was reported to be between ₹18–21 crore. The film was reported to have grossed ₹23 crore with the net collection being ₹19.55 crore in 11 days. The final collections were reported to be ₹29.20 crores.
