= 14th South Indian International Movie Awards =

2026 award ceremony in Bengaluru, India

- Awarded for: Excellence in South Indian cinema
- Date: 12–13 September 2026
- Site: Koramangala Indoor Stadium, Bengaluru, India
- Hosted by: Akul Balaji; Ankita Amar; Bindu Madhavi; Dhanya Balakrishna; Govind Padmasoorya; Sathish
- Organized by: Vibri Media Group

Highlights
- Best Film: Telugu – Mirai; Tamil – Dragon; Malayalam – Lokah Chapter 1: Chandra; Kannada – Kantara: Chapter 1
- Most awards: Kantara: Chapter 1 (10)
- Most nominations: Dragon, Lokah Chapter 1: Chandra and Mirai (11)

Television coverage
- Channel: Sun Gemini (Telugu); Sun TV (Tamil); Sun Surya (Malayalam); Sun Udaya (Kannada)
- Network: Sun TV Network

The 14th South Indian International Movie Awards is an awards event that took place at the Koramangala Indoor Stadium in Bengaluru, India on 12–13 September 2026. The ceremony (14th SIIMA) recognized and honored the best films and performances from Telugu, Tamil, Malayalam and Kannada films released in 2025, along with special honours for lifetime contributions and a few special awards. The nominations were announced in late-July 2026.

The first day of the ceremony (12 September 2026) awarded the best films and performances from the Telugu and Kannada cinema, whereas on the second day (13 September 2026), best films and performances from the Tamil and Malayalam cinema were awarded. Akul Balaji and Bindu Madhavi have hosted the Telugu cinema segment. Sathish and Dhanya Balakrishna have hosted the Tamil segment. Govind Padmasoorya had co-hosted the Malayalam cinema segment. Akul Balaji had also co-hosted the Kannada cinema segment along with Ankita Amar.

Kantara: Chapter 1 is the most awarded film with ten awards followed by Sankranthiki Vasthunam, Sarvam Maya, and Tourist Family with five, and Court: State vs a Nobody with five. Sankranthiki Vasthunam is the most awarded Telugu film followed by Court: State vs a Nobody. Tourist Family is the most awarded Tamil film followed by Dragon. Sarvam Maya is the most awarded Malayalam film followed by Eko. Kantara: Chapter 1 is the most awarded Kannada film followed by Su From So.

== Main awards and nominees ==
=== Film ===
Best Film
| Telugu | Tamil |
|---|---|
| Mirai – People Media Factory; Court: State vs a Nobody – Wall Poster Cinema; HIT: The Third Case – Wall Poster Cinema and Unanimous Productions; Sankranthiki Vasthunam – Sri Venkateswara Creations; Thandel – Geetha Arts; The Girlfriend – Dheeraj Mogilineni Entertainment | Dragon – AGS Entertainment; 3BHK – Shanthi Talkies; Bison Kaalamaadan – Applause Entertainment and Neelam Studios; Kaantha – Spirit Media and Wayfarer Films; Sirai – Seven Screen Studio; Tourist Family – Million Dollar Studios and MRP Entertainment |
| Kannada | Malayalam |
| Kantara: Chapter 1 – Hombale Films; Ekka – PRK Productions, Jayanna Films and KRG Studios; Elumale – Tharun Sudhir Kreatiiivez and De Arte Studios; Mark – Sathya Jyothi Films and Kichcha Creations; Mithya – Paramvah Studios; Su From So – Lighter Buddha Films | Lokah Chapter 1: Chandra – Wayfarer Films; Eko – Aaradyaa Studios; L2: Empuraan – Aashirvad Cinemas, Lyca Productions and Sree Gokulam Movies; Ponman – Ajith Vinayaka Films; Sarvam Maya – Firefly Films and Akhil Sathyan Films; Thudarum – Rejaputhra Visual Media |
Best Director
| Telugu | Tamil |
| Anil Ravipudi – Sankranthiki Vasthunam; Chandoo Mondeti – Thandel; Karthik Gattamneni – Mirai; Rahul Ravindran – The Girlfriend; Sujeeth – They Call Him OG; Sailesh Kolanu – HIT: The Third Case | Ashwath Marimuthu – Dragon; Mari Selvaraj – Bison Kaalamaadan; Ram – Paranthu Po; Sri Ganesh – 3BHK; S. U. Arun Kumar – Veera Dheera Sooran |
| Kannada | Malayalam |
| Rishab Shetty – Kantara: Chapter 1; Karvva Navneeth – Choo Mantar; Rohit Padaki – Ekka; Suni – Gatha Vaibhava; Vijay Kartikeyaa – Mark; Punit Rangaswamy – Elumale | Tharun Moorthy – Thudarum; Akhil Sathyan – Sarvam Maya; Dinjith Ayyathan – Eko; Dominic Arun – Lokah Chapter 1: Chandra; Prithviraj Sukumaran – L2: Empuraan; Rahul Sadasivan – Diés Iraé |
Best Cinematographer
| Telugu | Tamil |
| Karthik Gattamneni – Mirai; Jomon T. John and Girish Gangadharan – Kingdom; Sanu Varghese – HIT: The Third Case; Shamdat – Thandel; Vijay Kartik Kannan – Daaku Maharaaj | Ravi K. Chandran – Thug Life; Ezhil Arasu K – Bison Kaalamaadan; Madhesh Manickam – Sirai; Niketh Bommi – Dragon; Theni Eswar – Veera Dheera Sooran |
| Kannada | Malayalam |
| Arvind S Kashyap – Kantara: Chapter 1; Abhimanyu Sadanandan – Edagaiye Apaghatakke Karana; S. Chandrasekaran – Su From So; Udit Khurana – Mithya; William David – Gatha Vaibhava | Bahul Ramesh – Eko; Nimish Ravi – Lokah Chapter 1: Chandra; Shaji Kumar – Thudarum; Sharan Velayudhan – Sarvam Maya; Sanu Varghese – Ponman |

=== Acting ===
Best Actor
| Telugu | Tamil |
|---|---|
| Naga Chaitanya – Thandel; Dhanush – Kuberaa; Nani – HIT: The Third Case; Pawan Kalyan – They Call Him OG; Teja Sajja – Mirai; Venkatesh – Sankranthiki Vasthunam | Dhruv Vikram – Bison Kaalamaadan; Dulquer Salmaan – Kaantha; Pradeep Ranganathan – Dragon; M. Sasikumar – Tourist Family; Vijay Sethupathi – Thalaivan Thalaivii; Vikram – Veera Dheera Sooran |
| Kannada | Malayalam |
| Rishab Shetty – Kantara: Chapter 1; Diganth Manchale – Edagaiye Apaghatakke Karana; Sharan – Choo Mantar; Shiva Rajkumar – 45; Sudeepa – Mark; Vinod Prabhakar – Maadeva | Nivin Pauly – Sarvam Maya; Naslen – Lokah Chapter 1: Chandra; Mammootty – Kalamkaval; Basil Joseph – Ponman; Mohanlal – Thudarum; Sandeep Pradeep – Eko |
Best Actress
| Telugu | Tamil |
| Rashmika Mandanna – The Girlfriend; Aishwarya Rajesh – Sankranthiki Vasthunam; Raashii Khanna – Telusu Kada; Ritika Nayak – Mirai; Sai Pallavi – Thandel; Srinidhi Shetty – HIT: The Third Case | Simran – Tourist Family; Bhagyashri Borse – Kaantha; Keerthy Suresh – Revolver Rita; Nithya Menen – Kadhalikka Neramillai; Mamitha Baiju – Dude; Geetha Kailasam – Angammal |
| Kannada | Malayalam |
| Rukmini Vasanth – Kantara: Chapter 1; Ashika Ranganath – Gatha Vaibhava; Paavana Gowda – Agnyathavasi; Sreeleela – Junior; Sanjana Anand – Ekka; Sonal Monteiro – Maadeva | Kalyani Priyadarshan – Lokah Chapter 1: Chandra; Anaswara Rajan – Rekhachithram; Riya Shibu – Sarvam Maya; Shobana – Thudarum; Lijomol Jose – Ponman; Shamla Hamza – Feminichi Fathima |
Best Actor in a Supporting Role
| Telugu | Tamil |
| Satyadev – Kingdom; Jayaram – Mirai; Muralidhar Goud – Sankranthiki Vasthunam; Priyadarshi Pulikonda – Court: State vs a Nobody; Rajeev Kanakala – Little Hearts; Upendra – Andhra King Taluka | P. Samuthirakani – Kaantha; R. Sarathkumar – Dude; Pasupathy – Bison Kaalamaadan; Soubin Shahir – Coolie; Mysskin – Dragon |
| Kannada | Malayalam |
| J. P. Thuminad – Su From So; Jayaram – Kantara: Chapter 1; Mahantesh Hiremath – Hebbuli Cut; Siddu Moolimani – Agnyathavasi; T. S. Nagabharana – Elumale | Ganapathi S. Poduval – Alappuzha Gymkhana; Sangeeth Prathap – Hridayapoorvam; Binu Pappu – Thudarum; Dileesh Pothan – Ronth; Vineeth – Eko |
Best Actress in a Supporting Role
| Telugu | Tamil |
| Shraddha Srinath – Daaku Maharaaj; Anu Emmanuel – The Girlfriend; Komalee Prasad – HIT: The Third Case; Sriya Reddy – They Call Him OG; Shriya Saran – Mirai | Swasika – Maaman; Rajisha Vijayan – Bison Kaalamaadan; Radikaa Sarathkumar – Revolver Rita; Meetha Raghunath – 3BHK; Shantipriya – Bad Girl |
| Kannada | Malayalam |
| Akshitha Bopaiah – Kamal Sridevi; Apoorva Bharadwaj – Nimma Vasthugalige Neeve Javaabdaararu; Archana Kottige – Forest; Roopashree Varkady – Mithya; Meghana Gaonkar – Choo Mantar | Anagha Maya Ravi – Alappuzha Gymkhana; Biana Momin – Eko; Zarin Shihab – Rekhachithram; Priyamani – Officer on Duty; Jaya Kurup – Diés Iraé |
Best Actor in a Negative Role
| Telugu | Tamil |
| Manchu Manoj – Mirai; Bobby Deol – Daaku Maharaaj; Dheekshith Shetty – The Girlfriend; Emraan Hashmi – They Call Him OG; Sivaji – Court: State vs a Nobody | Arjun Das – Good Bad Ugly; Arjun Sarja – Vidaamuyarchi; Nagarjuna – Coolie; Silambarasan – Thug Life; Selvaraghavan – Aaryan; Moor – Others |
| Kannada | Malayalam |
| Gulshan Devaiah – Kantara: Chapter 1; Gopalkrishna Deshpande – Kothalavadi; Kishore – Elumale; Naveen Chandra – Mark; Ramesh Indira – Brat | Prakash Varma – Thudarum; Cheran – Narivetta; Sajin Gopu – Ponman; Saurabh Sachdeva – Eko; Vishak Nair – Officer on Duty |
Best Comedian
| Telugu | Tamil |
| Bheemala Revanth Pavan Sai Subhash – Sankranthiki Vasthunam; Getup Srinu – Mirai; Jai Krishna – Little Hearts; Krishna Burugula – Jigris; Vennela Kishore – Single; Vishnu Oi – Mad Square | Yogi Babu – Tourist Family; Harshath Khan – Dragon; Jenson Dhivakar – Aan Paavam Pollathathu; Rajendran – Devil's Double Next Level; Sunil – Good Bad Ugly; Vadivelu – Gangers |
| Kannada | Malayalam |
| Sadhu Kokila – Ekka; Chikkanna – Choo Mantar; Govinde Gowda – Dilmaar; Mahantesh Hiremath – Arasayyana Prema Prasanga; Gilli Nata – The Devil | Aju Varghese – Sarvam Maya; Chandu Salim Kumar – Lokah Chapter 1: Chandra; Joemon Jyothir – Maranamass; Alphonse Puthren – Balti; Unni Raj – Avihitham |

=== Debut ===
Best Debut Actor
| Telugu | Tamil |
|---|---|
| Harsh Roshan – Court: State vs a Nobody; Mouli Tanuj Prasanth – Little Hearts; Pranav Kaushik – Patang; Devan – Krishna Leela; Manoj Chandra – Kothapallilo Okappudu; Vamsi Pujit – Patang | LK Akshay Kumar – Sirai; Akash Murali – Nesippaya; Aditya Madhavan – Others; Rudra – Oho Enthan Baby; Pavish Narayan – Nilavuku En Mel Ennadi Kobam; Surya Sethupathi – Phoenix |
| Kannada | Malayalam |
| Kireeti Reddy – Junior; Maahir Mohiuddin – Vritta; SS Dushyanth – Gatha Vaibhava; Shaneel Gautham – Su From So; Sumukha – Manada Kadalu; Vamshi Krishna Srinivas – Firefly | Sandy – Lokah Chapter 1: Chandra; Baby Jean – Alappuzha Gymkhana; Karthik – Alappuzha Gymkhana; Al Ameen – Detective Ujjwalan; Orhan Hyder – Sarkeet |
Best Debut Actress
| Telugu | Tamil |
| Sridevi Apalla – Court: State vs a Nobody; Sakkshi Mhadolkar – Mowgli; Preethi Pagadala – Patang; Malavika Manoj – Oh Bhama Ayyo Rama; Virti Vaghani – Sundarakanda | Kayadu Lohar – Dragon; Anishma Anilkumar – Sirai; Aarsha Chandini Baiju – House Mates; Yogalakshmi – Tourist Family; Anjali Sivaraman – Bad Girl; Saanve Megghana – Kudumbasthan |
| Kannada | Malayalam |
| Priyanka Achar – Elumale; Kavya Shaiva – Kothalavadi; Manisha Kandkur – Brat; Mouna Guddemane – Kuladalli Keelyavudo; Rashika Shetty – Manada Kadalu; Viranika Shetty – Dharmam | Preity Mukhundhan – Maine Pyar Kiya; Sushmitha Bhat – Dominic and the Ladies' Purse; Durga C. Vinod – Lokah Chapter 1: Chandra; Raniya Rana – Prince and Family; Revathy Sarma – Thalavara |
Best Debut Director
| Telugu | Tamil |
| Ram Jagadeesh – Court: State vs a Nobody; Jains Nani – K-Ramp; Neeraja Kona – Telusu Kada; Saailu Kampati – Raju Weds Rambai; Sai Marthand – Little Hearts; Praveena Paruchuri – Kothapallilo Okappudu; Praneeth Prattipati – Patang | Abishan Jeevinth – Tourist Family; Keerthiswaran – Dude; Kalaiarasan Thangavel – Aan Paavam Pollathathu; Rajeshwar Kalisamy – Kudumbasthan; Suresh Rajakumari – Sirai; Varsha Bharath – Bad Girl |
| Kannada | Malayalam |
| J. P. Thuminad – Su From So; Bheemarao P – Hebbuli Cut; Vamshi Krishna Srinivas – Firefly; Kuldeep Cariappa – Nodidavaru Enanthare; Sumanth Bhat – Mithya; Keshav Moorthy – Nimma Vasthugalige Neeve Javaabdaararu | Fasil Muhammed – Feminichi Fathima; Jithin K. Jose – Kalamkaval; Jithu Ashraf – Officer on Duty; Jothish Shankar – Ponman; Manu Swaraj – Padakkalam |
Best Debut Producer
| Telugu | Tamil |
| Aditya Hasan (Bairagi Kathalu) – Little Hearts; Mahidhar Reddy, Rajashekhar Annabhimoju (Shining Pictures) – Shambhala; Raj Rachakonda (Studio 99) – 23 Iravai Moodu; Samantha Ruth Prabhu (Tralala Moving Pictures) – Subham; Santhosh Chinnapolla, Gowtham Reddy, Rakesh Mahankalli (Sandeep Picture Palace) – Sundarakanda; Sreenivasulu P. V., Vijay Donkada, Sridhar Makkuva (Ananda Media) – Paradha; Venu Udugula (Dolamukhi Subaltern Films) – Raju Weds Rambai | Cinemakaaran – Kudumbasthan; Artuptriangles Film Kampany – Gevi; Madras Motion Pictures – Madras Matinee; New Monk Pictures – Good Day; Seven Seas and Seven Hills Productions – Paranthu Po |
| Kannada | Malayalam |
| Niveditha Shivarajkumar – Firefly; B. Ajaneesh Loknath, C. R. Bobby – Just Married; Chandan Kumar – Flirt; Manasa Tarun, Tarun Shivappa – Choo Mantar; Nagesh Gopal – Nodidavaru Enanthare; Pushpa Arunkumar – Kothalavadi | Aaradyaa Studios – Eko; Firefly Films – Sarvam Maya; Festival Cinemas – Ronth; Indian Cinema Company – Narivetta; Sharaf U Dheen Productions – The Pet Detective |

=== Music ===
Best Music Director
| Telugu | Tamil |
|---|---|
| Thaman S – They Call Him OG; Bheems Ceciroleo – Sankranthiki Vasthunam; Devi Sri Prasad – Thandel; Gowra Hari – Mirai; Hesham Abdul Wahab – The Girlfriend; Vijai Bulganin – Court: State vs a Nobody | Sai Abhyankkar – Dude; Anirudh Ravichander – Coolie; A. R. Rahman – Thug Life; Leon James – Dragon; Sean Roldan – Tourist Family |
| Kannada | Malayalam |
| B. Ajaneesh Loknath – Kantara: Chapter 1; Arjun Janya – Brat; Charan Raj – Ekka; Judah Sandhy – Gatha Vaibhava; V. Harikrishna – Manada Kadalu; Sumedh K – Su From So | Justin Prabhakaran – Sarvam Maya; Jakes Bejoy – Lokah Chapter 1: Chandra; Mujeeb Majeed – Kalamkaval; Sai Abhyankkar – Balti; Vishnu Vijay – Alappuzha Gymkhana |
Best Lyricist
| Telugu | Tamil |
| Purna Chary – "Premalo" from Court: State vs a Nobody; Ram Pothineni – "Nuvvunte Chaley" from Andhra King Taluka; Bhaskarabhatla – "Godari Gattu" from Sankranthiki Vasthunam; Sri Mani – "Bujji Thalli" from Thandel; Vanamali – "Parichayamila" from 8 Vasantalu | Sarathi – "Neelothi" from Sirai; Karthik Netha – "Anju Vanna Poove" from Thug Life; Mohan Rajan – "Mugai Mazhai" from Tourist Family; Vignesh Shivan and Ko Sesha – "Vazhithunaiye" from Dragon; Vivek – "Kanimaa" from Retro |
| Kannada | Malayalam |
| Pramod Maravanthe – "Madana Mana Mohini" from Kantara: Chapter 1; Nagarjun Sharma – "Bangle Bangari" from Ekka; Prithvi Antha – "Scooter Song" from Su From So; Shashank – "Naane Neenanthe" from Brat; Suni – "Varnamaale" from Gatha Vaibhava | B. K. Harinarayanan – "Kanmanipoove" from Thudarum; Kaithapram Damodaran Namboothiri – "Minnalvala" from Narivetta; Muhsin Parari – "Thani Lokah Murakkaari" from Lokah Chapter 1: Chandra; Suhail Koya – "Panjara Punch" from Alappuzha Gymkhana; Vinayak Sasikumar – "Jaalakaari" from Balti |
Best Male Playback Singer
| Telugu | Tamil |
| Ramana Gogula – "Godari Gattu" from Sankranthiki Vasthunam; Anurag Kulkarni – "Rambai Neemeedha Naku" from Raju Weds Rambai; Armaan Malik – "Vibe Undi" from Mirai; Dhanush – "Poyiraa Mama" from Kuberaa; Javed Ali – "Bujji Thalli" from Thandel | Vijay Yesudas – "Iragey" from Tourist Family; Ravi G – "Thangapoovey" from Madharaasi; Santhosh Narayanan – "Kanimaa" from Retro; Sid Sriram – "Vazhithunaiye" from Dragon; Sai Abhyankkar – "Oorum Blood" from Dude |
| Kannada | Malayalam |
| Anurag Kulkarni – "Danks Anthem" from Su From So; Anthony Daasan – "Bangle Bangari" from Ekka; Deepak Blue – "Idre Nemdiyaag Irbek" from The Devil; Sid Sriram – "Naane Neenanthe" from Brat; Vijay Prakash – "Madana Mana Mohini" from Kantara: Chapter 1 | Sai Abhyankkar – "Jaalakaari" from Balti; Job Kurian – "Kaavalaai Chekavar" from L2: Empuraan; M. G. Sreekumar – "Kanmanipoove" from Thudarum; Sid Sriram – "Minnalvala" from Narivetta; Vineeth Sreenivasan – "Vellarathaaram" from Sarvam Maya |
Best Female Playback Singer
| Telugu | Tamil |
| Sameera Bharadwaj – "Premalo" from Court: State vs a Nobody; Chinmayi Sripada – "Em Jaruguthondhi" from The Girlfriend; K. S. Chithra – "Parichayamila" from 8 Vasantalu; Madhu Priya – "Godari Gattu" from Sankranthiki Vasthunam; Shreya Ghoshal – "Hilesso Hilessa" from Thandel; Sruthi Ranjani – "Suvvi Suvvi" from They Call Him OG | Shruti Haasan – "Vinveli Nayaga" from Thug Life; Chinmayi Sripada – "Cheenikkallu" from Bison Kaalamaadan; Dhee – "Muththa Mazhai" from Thug Life; Sanjana Kalmanje – "Vazhithunaiye" from Dragon; Sublahshini – "Monica" from Coolie |
| Kannada | Malayalam |
| Sanvi Sudeep – "Masth Malaika" from Mark; Ananya Bhat – "Edeli Thangaali" from Maadeva; Mangli – "Kaapaado Dyavre" from Elumale; Sunidhi Ganesh – "Varnamaale" from Gatha Vaibhava; Ankita Kundu – "Raghava Raghava" from Unlock Raghava | Shakthisree Gopalan – "Puthu Mazha" from Sarvam Maya; Anila Rajeev – "Pemari" from Thudarum; K. S. Chithra – "Paka" from Ponman; Jyoti Nooran – "Thani Lokah Murakkaari" from Lokah Chapter 1: Chandra; Sindhu Delson – "Nilaa Kaayum" from Kalamkaval |

== Critics choice awards ==
Telugu cinema

- Best Director – Chandoo Mondeti – Thandel
- Best Actor – Teja Sajja – Mirai
- Best Actress – Aishwarya Rajesh – Sankranthiki Vasthunam

Tamil cinema

- Best Film – Million Dollar Studios and MRP Entertainment – Tourist Family
- Best Actor – Pradeep Ranganathan – Dragon
- Best Actress – Bhagyashri Borse – Kaantha

Kannada cinema

- Best Director – Karvva Navneeth – Choo Mantar
- Best Actor – Vinod Prabhakar – Maadeva
- Best Actress – Ashika Ranganath – Gatha Vaibhava

Malayalam cinema

- Best Film – Firefly Films and Akhil Sathyan Films – Sarvam Maya
- Best Actor – Basil Joseph – Ponman
- Best Actress – Riya Shibu – Sarvam Maya

== Special awards ==
- Lifetime Achievement Award – Bharathi Vishnuvardhan and Lakshmi
- 25 years of cinematic excellence – Shriya Saran
- 20 years of cinematic excellence – Boyapati Srinu
- 40 years of cinematic excellence – Khushbu Sundar
- Entertaining Film of the Year – Dil Raju – Sankranthiki Vasthunam
- Entertainer of the Year (Telugu) – Venkatesh – Sankranthiki Vasthunam (Note: Received by Rana Daggubati)
- Entertainer of the Year (Kannada) – Shiva Rajkumar – 45
- Promising Newcomer (Telugu) – Sakkshi Mhadolkar – Mowgli
- Promising Newcomer (Tamil) – Aditya Madhavan – Others
- Promising Newcomer (Malayalam) – Sandeep Pradeep – Eko
- Promising Newcomer (Kannada) – SS Dushyanth – Gatha Vaibhava
- Sensational Singer – Sublahshini
- Special Appreciation – M. Sasikumar – Tourist Family
- Special Appreciation for portrayal of the character Mayakaara – Rishab Shetty – Kantara: Chapter 1
- Special Appreciation for Costume Design – Pragathi Shetty – Kantara: Chapter 1

== Superlatives ==
Films with multiple nominations
| Nominations | Film |
|---|---|
| 11 | Dragon |
| 11 | Lokah Chapter 1: Chandra |
| 11 | Mirai |
| 10 | Kantara: Chapter 1 |
| 10 | Sankranthiki Vasthunam |
| 10 | Sarvam Maya |
| 10 | Thudarum |
| 9 | Court: State vs a Nobody |
| 9 | Thandel |
| 9 | Tourist Family |
| 8 | Eko |
| 8 | Su From So |
| 7 | Bison Kaalamaadan |
| 7 | Ekka |
| 7 | Gatha Vaibhava |
| 7 | Ponman |
| 7 | The Girlfriend |
| 6 | Alappuzha Gymkhana |
| 6 | Elumale |
| 6 | HIT: The Third Case |
| 6 | Sirai |
| 6 | They Call Him OG |
| 6 | Thug Life |
| 5 | Dude |
| 5 | Choo Mantar |
| 5 | Little Hearts |
| 5 | Mark |
| 4 | Balti |
| 4 | Brat |
| 4 | Coolie |
| 4 | Kaantha |
| 4 | Kalamkaval |
| 4 | Mithya |
| 4 | Patang |
| 3 | 3BHK |
| 3 | Bad Girl |
| 3 | Daaku Maharaaj |
| 3 | Diés Iraé |
| 3 | Firefly |
| 3 | Kothalavadi |
| 3 | Kudumbasthan |
| 3 | L2: Empuraan |
| 3 | Maadeva |
| 3 | Manada Kadalu |
| 3 | Narivetta |
| 3 | Officer on Duty |
| 3 | Raju Weds Rambai |
| 3 | Veera Dheera Sooran |
| 2 | Aan Paavam Pollathathu |
| 2 | Agnyathavasi |
| 2 | Andhra King Taluka |
| 2 | Edagaiye Apaghatakke Karana |
| 2 | Feminichi Fathima |
| 2 | Good Bad Ugly |
| 2 | Hebbuli Cut |
| 2 | Junior |
| 2 | Kingdom |
| 2 | Kothapallilo Okappudu |
| 2 | Kuberaa |
| 2 | Nimma Vasthugalige Neeve Javaabdaararu |
| 2 | Nodidavaru Enanthare |
| 2 | Others |
| 2 | Paranthu Po |
| 2 | Rekhachithram |
| 2 | Revolver Rita |
| 2 | Ronth |
| 2 | Sundarakanda |
| 2 | Telusu Kada |
| 2 | The Devil |

Films with multiple awards
| Awards | Film |
|---|---|
| 10 | Kantara: Chapter 1 (Note: Including two non-competitive awards (Special Appreciation for portrayal of the character Mayakaara and Special Appreciation for Costume Design)) |
| 6 | Sankranthiki Vasthunam (Note: Including three non-competitive awards (SIIMA Critics Award for Best Actress – Telugu, Entertaining Film of the Year and Entertainer of the Year)) |
| 6 | Sarvam Maya (Note: Including two non-competitive awards (SIIMA Critics Award for Best Film – Malayalam and SIIMA Critics Award for Best Actress – Malayalam)) |
| 6 | Tourist Family (Note: Including two non-competitive awards (SIIMA Critics Award for Best Film – Tamil and Special Appreciation)) |
| 5 | Court: State vs a Nobody |
| 4 | Dragon (Note: Including a non-competitive award (SIIMA Critics Award for Best Actor – Tamil)) |
| 4 | Mirai (Note: Including a non-competitive award (SIIMA Critics Award for Best Actor – Telugu)) |
| 3 | Eko (Note: Including a non-competitive award (SIIMA Promising Newcomer)) |
| 3 | Lokah Chapter 1: Chandra |
| 3 | Su From So |
| 3 | Thudarum |
| 2 | Alappuzha Gymkhana |
| 2 | Kaantha (Note: Including a non-competitive award (SIIMA Critics Award for Best Actress – Tamil)) |
| 2 | Sirai |
| 2 | Thandel (Note: Including a non-competitive award (SIIMA Critics Award for Best Director – Telugu)) |
| 2 | Thug Life |

== Performers ==
| Performer | Work |
|---|---|
| Faria Abdullah | Dance |
| Harsh Roshan and Sridevi Apalla | Dance |
| Iswarya Menon | Dance |
| Nabha Natesh | Dance |
| Sai Abhyankkar | Music |
| Shakthisree Gopalan and Sublahshini | Music |
| Pragya Nagra | Dance |
| Vedhika | Dance |
