= Telangana Gaddar Film Awards 2025 =

2nd Telangana Gaddar Film Awards
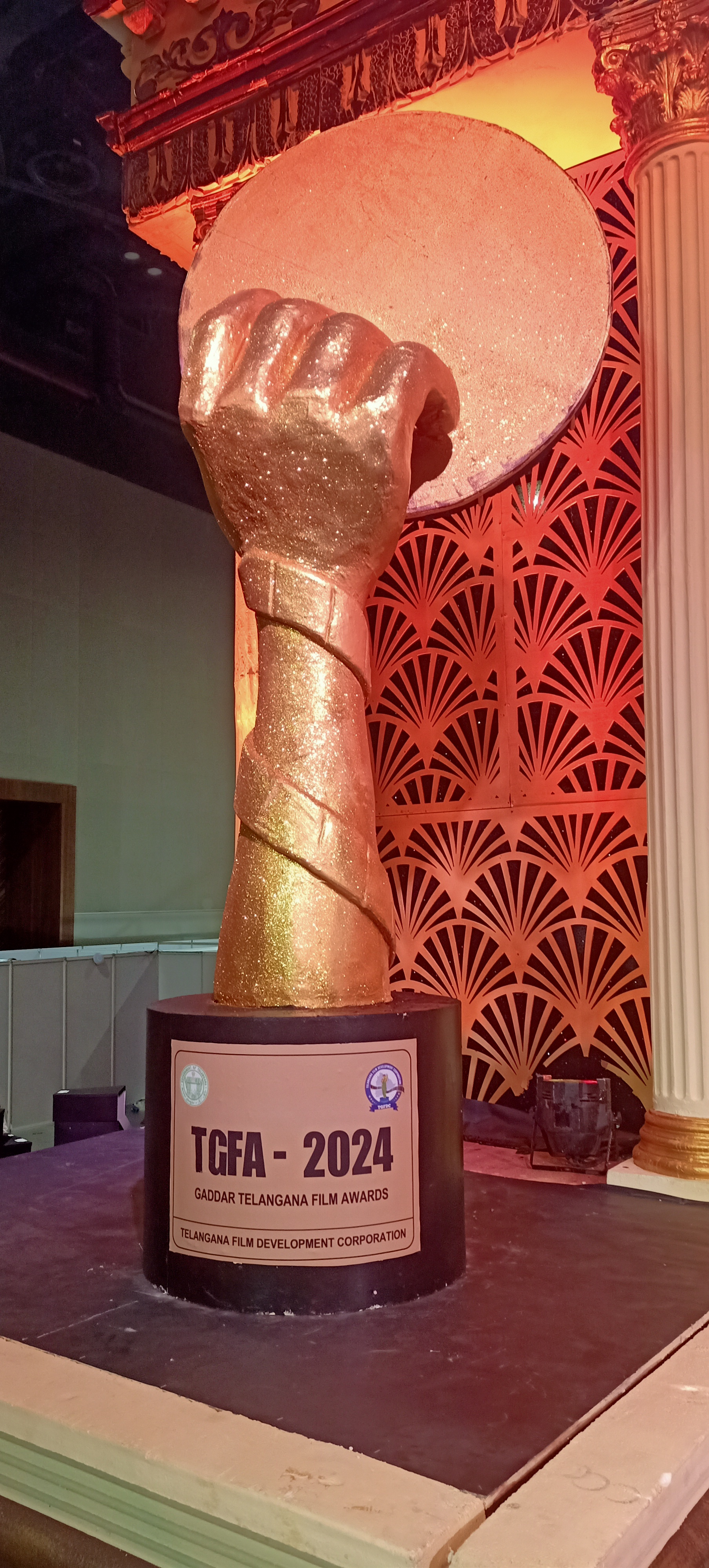
- Awarded for: Best of Telugu cinema in 2025
- Awarded by: Telangana Film Development Corporation
- Presented by: Government of Telangana
- Announced on: 6 March 2026
- Presented on: 19 March 2026
- Site: HITEX Convention Center Hyderabad

Highlights
- Best Feature Film: Raju Weds Rambai
- Most awards: Champion (5)

The 2nd Telangana Gaddar Film Awards were announced by the Telangana Film Development Corporation on 6 March 2026 to honour the best films of 2025 in Telugu cinema for films certified during the period from January 1 to December 31, 2025. These annual awards are presented by the Government of Telangana to recognise excellence in Telugu cinema, as well as lifetime achievements in Indian cinema.

The ceremony of the Awards was held at HITEX Exhibition Centre, Hyderabad on 19 March 2026 on the occasion of Ugadi festival. The event was attended by Telangana Chief Minister Revanth Reddy, Deputy Chief Minister Mallu Bhatti Vikramarka, Minister for Tourism Jupally Krishna Rao, and Dil Raju, chairman of the Telangana Film Development Corporation (TGFDC).

== Jury ==
Music director Mani Sharma chaired the Feature Film jury, Kanakamedala Vijay Krishna headed the Short Film & Documentaries jury, and Thammareddy Bharadwaj led the Special Jury committee. Writer and director Tanikella Bharani chaired the jury for Books and Critics on Telugu Cinema.

== Special awards ==
| Award | Awardee(s) |
|---|---|
| NTR National Film Award - Artist only | Konidela Chiranjeevi |
| Paidi Jairaj Film Award - Indian film personality | Kamal Haasan |
| Raghupathi Venkaiah Film Award - Other than film artist Telugu | Ramesh Prasad |
| B N Reddy Film Award - Telugu film director | Singeetham Srinivasa Rao |
| Nagireddy & Chakrapani Film Award - Telugu producer | C. Aswini Dutt |
| Kantha Rao Award - Telugu artist | R. Narayana Murthy |
| C. Narayana Reddy Film Award - Poet, writer of Telugu cinema | Suddala Ashok Teja |
| Akkineni Nageshwara Rao Film Award - Indian Film Artist (female) | Jayasudha |

== Main awards ==
=== Feature Film ===
| Award | Film | Awardee(s) |
|---|---|---|
| First Best Feature Film | Raju Weds Rambai | Producer: Venu Udugula, Rahul Mopidevi; Director: Saailu Kampati |
| Second Best Feature Film | Dhandoraa | Producer: Ravindra Benerjee Muppaneni; Director: Muralikanth Devasoth |
| Third Best Feature Film | The Great Pre Wedding Show | Producer: Sanddeep Agaram, Ashmita Reddy Basani; Director: Rahul Srinivas Lukalapu |
| Feature Film on National Integration, Communal Harmony and Social Uplift | Thandel | Producer: Bunny Vas; Director: Chandoo Mondeti |
| Feature Film on Environment, Heritage and History | EGWA | Producer: V.K. Raju; Director: |
| Dr. M Prabhakar Reddy Best Wholesome Entertainment Film | Sankranthiki Vasthunam | Producer: Dil Raju, Sirish; Director: Anil Ravipudi |
| Feature Film on Social Message | Court | Producer: Nani, Prashanti Tipirneni; Director: Ram Jagadeesh |
| Best Children's Film | Anaganaga | Producer: Rakesh Reddy Gadam, Rudradev Madireddy; Director: Sunny Sanjay |

=== Individual and Technical Awards ===
| Award | Awardee(s) | Film |
|---|---|---|
| Best Director | Saailu Kampati | Raju Weds Rambai |
| Best Actor | Naga Chaitanya | Thandel |
| Best Actress | Rashmika Mandanna | The Girlfriend |
| Best Supporting Actor | Sivaji | Dhandoraa |
| Best Supporting Actress | Bhumika | Euphoria |
| Best Child Actor | Rohan Roy | The Great Pre Wedding Show |
| Best Child Actress | | |
| Best Comedian | Krishna Teja Reddy | Jigris |
| Best Music Director | Mark K. Robin | Dhandoraa |
| Best Lyricist | Nanda Kishore | Kuberaa |
| Best Male Playback Singer | Anurag Kulkarni | Raju Weds Rambai |
| Best Female Playback Singer | Sahithi Chaganti | Kannappa |
| Best Story Writer | Gunasekhar | Euphoria |
| Best Screenplay Writer | Anil Ravipudi | Sankranthiki Vasthunam |
| Best Cinematographer | Karthik Ghattamaneni | Mirai |
| Best Editor | A. Sreekar Prasad | Mirai |
| Best Audiographer | M. R. Rajakrishnan | Kishkindhapuri |
| Best Choreographer | Gira Gira Gira (Aata Sandeep) | Champion |
| Best Art Director | Thota Tharani | Champion |
| Best Action Choreographer | Peter Heins | Champion |
| Best Make-up Artist | Y. Govindaraju | Akhanda 2 |
| Best Costume Designer | Chandrakant Sonavani, Ajay Kumar Nambala | Champion |
| Special Jury Award | Raj Rachakonda | 23 Iravai Moodu |
| Special Jury Award | Chaitu Jonnalagadda | Raju Weds Rambai |
| Special Jury Award | Ananthika | 8 Vasanthalu |
| Special Jury Award | Roshan | Champion |

=== Best Documentary Films ===
| Award | Film | Awardee(s) |
|---|---|---|
| First Best Documentary Film | UNITY - The Man of Social Justice | Producer: Chiramdasu Sreekanth; Director: Badugu Vijay Kumar |
| Second Best Documentary Film | The First Action Hero Paidi Jairaj Prasthanam | Producer: Ponnam Ravi Chandra; Director: Kathi Chetan |
| Third Best Documentary Film | Mahamaneeshi Dr. A. S. Rao | Producer:Bala Brahmachari Pusapati |

=== Best Short Films ===
| Award | Film | Awardee(s) |
|---|---|---|
| First Best Short Film | Vanajeevi Ramaiah | Busam Ravindranath |
| Second Best Short Film | Mouname Nee Bhasha | Raghavendra Varma Indukuri, Vishwas Hannurkar |
| Third Best Short Film | Cyber Slavery | K. Neelima |
| Diploma of Merit | Talli Dandrula Atma Gouravam | Kanaparthi Hanumandlu |

=== Best Books/ Articles on Telugu cinema for Telangana ===
| Award | Category | Awardee(s) |
|---|---|---|
| Best Book | Shunyam Nundi Shikharagralaku | Journalist Prabhu |
| Best Critic | | H. Ramesh Babu |
