= SIIMA Critics Award for Best Actress – Kannada =

Kannada-language media award

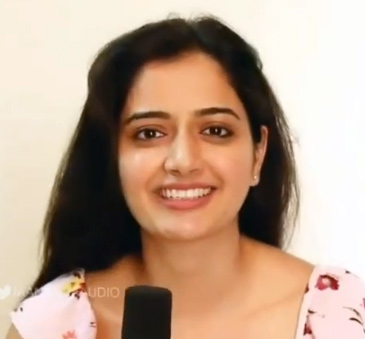
- The 2026 recipient: Ashika Ranganath
- Awarded for: Best Performance by an Actress in a Leading Role in a Kannada cinema
- Country: India
- Presented by: Vibri Media Group
- First award: 21 June 2012 (for films released in 2011)
- Most recent winner: Ashika Ranganath, Gatha Vaibhava (2025)

SIIMA Critics Award for Best Actress – Kannada is presented by Vibri media group as part of its annual South Indian International Movie Awards, for best acting done by an actress in Kannada films, who are selected by the jury. The award was first given in 2012 for films released in 2011.

== Superlatives ==
Categories	Recipient	Notes
Oldest winner	Sruthi Hariharan	Age 29
Youngest winner	Amulya	Age 21

- Ashika Ranganath, Rukmini Vasanth and Shanvi Srivastava have also won the SIIMA Award for Best Actress – Kannada.

== Winners ==
Year	Actress	Film	Ref.
2011	Nidhi Subbaiah	Krishnan Marriage Story	
2012	Ragini Dwivedi	Shiva	
2013	Amulya	Shravani Subramanya	
2014	Kriti Kharbanda	Super Ranga	
2015	Shanvi Srivastava	Masterpiece	
2016	Parul Yadav	Killing Veerappan	
2017	Sruthi Hariharan	Beautiful Manasugalu	
2018	Manvitha Kamath	Tagaru	
2019	Rashmika Mandanna	Yajamana	
2020	Kushee Ravi	Dia	
2021	Amrutha Iyengar	Badava Rascal	
2022	Sapthami Gowda	Kantara	
2023	Rukmini Vasanth	Sapta Saagaradaache Ello: Side A	
2024	Roshni Prakash	Murphy	
2025	Ashika Ranganath	Gatha Vaibhava	

== See also ==
- SIIMA Award for Best Actress – Kannada
