= Narivetta (soundtrack) =

- Soundtrack album cover

Soundtrack album by Jakes Bejoy
- Released: 23 May 2025
- Recorded: 2024–2025
- Studio: Mindscore Studio, Kochi; Sound Triado, Thiruvananthapuram; Soundtown, Chennai; M Lounge, Kochi; Melodia, Manjeri
- Genre: Feature film soundtrack
- Length: 37:21
- Language: Malayalam
- Label: Sony Music India
- Producer: Jakes Bejoy

Jakes Bejoy chronology
| Thudarum (2025) | Narivetta (2025) | Lokah Chapter 1: Chandra (2025) |

Singles from Narivetta
- 1. "Minnalvala" Released: 16 April 2025; 2. "Aadu Ponmayile" Released: 14 May 2025; 3. "Vaada Veda" Released: 20 May 2025

Narivetta is the soundtrack album composed by Jakes Bejoy to the 2025 Malayalam-language political action thriller film of the same name directed by Anuraj Manohar starring Tovino Thomas, Suraj Venjaramoodu, Cheran, Priyamvada Krishnan and Arya Salim. The soundtrack featured 12 songs, featuring lyrics written by Kaithapram Damodaran Namboothiri, Anwar Ali, B. K. Harinarayanan, Vedan, Athul Narukara, Balan Manthan, Prasad K. Much of the music featured adaptations of traditional folk songs from Wayanad Pulaya community.

The album was preceded by three singles—"Minnalvala", "Aadu Ponmayile" and "Vaada Veda"—and the album released on 23 May 2025, the same day as the film, under the Sony Music India label. The song "Minnalvala" was a chartbuster upon its release.

== Development ==
Jakes Bejoy composed the film score and soundtrack to Narivetta having previously worked with Manohar on his debut film Ishq (2019). Bejoy and his music team went to Wayanad in search of authentic folk songs from that locality. He collaborated with Athul Narukara, who had previously written "Kalakkatha" from Ayyappanum Koshiyum (2020), throughout the research. In a Manorama Online interview, Narukara considered the process of finding the song as difficult as they had to find songs from different backgrounds and places and go down to understand the identity of that song.

Throughout their research in Wayanad, he and Bejoy listened to the performances of the song "Aadu Ponmayile" live and got help from other singing groups Unarvu and Padayani. A local community member from Wayanad, explained on how the genre of the songs dying slowly, as the folk songs were mostly performed by locals who were hunting, and with the hunting ban, the use of this song decreased. On writing the song "Aadu Ponmayile", he denoted that the first four lines belong to the Wayanad Pulaya community who arranged the tune and was also credited for the song. The first part of the song "Ae Kaade Kaade" were written by B. K. Harinarayanan while Narukara wrote the later part of the lyrics, owing to his experience in writing folk songs.

The song "Minnalvala" was written by Kaithapram Damodaran Namboothiri, after a brief hiatus. Kaithapram recalled that the team approached him to write the song as they needed poetic lyrics, and felt impressed with the composition. He noted that the context of "Minnalvala" was based on poet Kalidasa's image from his Sanskrit poem Raghuvaṃśa. It denoted that after Ravana abducts Sita, the latter helplessly threw her hands out and screamed after which the lightning bolts in the sky decorated her hands with bangles. Manohar noted that the song was earlier written as a Christian devotional song, before a part of the lyrics symbolized the romantic flavour. The song was written in one-and-a-half hours. The other songs were written by Vedan, Anwar Ali, and folk artists from Wayanad.

== Release ==
The album was preceded with the first single "Minnalvala" which released on 16 April 2025. It was followed by the second song "Aadu Ponmayile" on 14 May and "Vaada Veda" on 20 May. The soundtrack was released under the Sony Music India label on 23 May, the same day as the film's release.

== Reception ==
Shilpa Nair Anand of The Hindu wrote "Jakes Bejoy's music deserves praise [...] The songs in the background underscore what owning a piece of land means to a tribal person whose everything is the forest. A line from one of the songs, 'they drift through their dreams with no land of their own', is haunting." Vignesh Madhu of The New Indian Express wrote "Jakes Bejoy's stirring score also plays its part in underlining the tragedy." Latha Srinivasan of Hindustan Times wrote "Jakes Bejoy's music added to the movie's emotional quotient, striking a chord in tempo with the heavy visuals."

Arjun Menon of Rediff.com wrote "Jakes Bejoy continues his use of culturally appropriate instrumentation and organic sounding score that remains true to the wild ways of the film's latter half. The cultural milieu and emotional scape of the film is earmarked by his unrelentingly rooted score that synchronizes with the docufiction approach of the filmmaking." Sruthi Ganapathy Raman of The Hollywood Reporter India wrote "Jakes Bejoy does a brilliant job, threading together the two opposite emotions in an impactful score."

The song "Minnalvala" became viral upon its release through social media platforms. It further topped the Spotify charts on the week of Kaithapram's 75th birthday (4 August).

== Track listing ==
| No. | Title | Lyrics | Singer(s) | Length |
|---|---|---|---|---|
| 1. | "Minnalvala" | Kaithapram Damodaran Namboothiri | Sid Sriram, Sithara Krishnakumar | 4:57 |
| 2. | "Vaada Veda" | Vedan | Vedan, Jakes Bejoy | 3:57 |
| 3. | "Maayum Maayum" | Vinu Kidachullan | Sruthi K C | 3:45 |
| 4. | "Kaatinu Meyan" | Anwar Ali | Sunil Mathai | 3:56 |
| 5. | "Aadu Ponmayile" | Athul Narukara, B. K. Harinarayanan | Athul Narukara, Bindu Chilakara | 4:19 |
| 6. | "Banchinthare" | Balan Manthan | Balan Manthan | 1:13 |
| 7. | "Neram Pilantha" | Prasad K | Prasad K | 2:05 |
| 8. | "Chaachappa" | Anwar Ali | Chinmayi Kiranlal, Jakes Bejoy | 1:59 |
| 9. | "Gaathakalil" | Vivek Muzhakkunnu | Yadu Krishnan K | 1:38 |
| 10. | "Aarkkum Venda" | Anwar Ali | Chinmayi Kiranlal | 1:46 |
| 11. | "Narivetta Trailer Theme" | — | — | 2:45 |
| 12. | "Minnalvala Karaoke" | — | — | 4:57 |
| Total length: | | | | 37:21 |

== Personnel ==
Credits adapted from Sony Music South:

- Music composer and arranger – Jakes Bejoy
- Music producers – Jakes Bejoy, Harishankar V, Midhun Ashok, Maneesh Shaji, Agasthya Raag, Manimaaran, Aby Tom, Andrew Gerlicher
- Backing vocals – Akhil J Chand, Aavani Malhar, Anila Rajeev, Sony Mohan, Milan Joy, Amal C Ajith, Unmesh Unnikrishnan
- Erhu – Haruyo Kimora San
  - Japan co-ordination – Vivek, Vineetha Vivek
  - Inhouse co-ordination – Akhil J Chand, Maneeth Manoj
- Bass – Napier Naveen
- Flute – Kiran, Josy Alappuzha
- Rhythm – Krishna Kishor
- Percussion – Sruthiraj
- Guitars – Sanu PS
- Solo violin – Nibu Matthew
- Orchestra – Budapest Scoring Orchestra
  - Orchestra recording studio – Rottenbiller Utca, Budapest
  - Conductor – Peter Illenyi
  - Orchestra Indian representative – Balasubramanian G
  - Session producer – Bálint Sapszon
  - Recording engineer – Viktor Sabzo
  - Librarian – Agnes Sapszon, Kati Reti
  - Orchestrators – Sanjar Ra, Balasubramanian G\
- Strings – Cochin Strings
- Chorus – Team Soul of Folk
- Folk instrumentation – Subhash PK, Abhinav Krishna PK, Sreehari Manghat
- Vocal tuning – Daniel Joseph Antony
- Session arranger and management – Maneeth Manoj, Maneesh Shaji
- Sound engineers – Midhun Anand, Unmesh Unnikrishnan, Najid Nizarudheen, Vishnu Shankar, Abin Ponnachan, Arnav Sharma, Amal Mithu, Muzza, Nishad
- Recording studios – Mindscore Studio (Kochi); Sound Triado (Trivandrum), Soundtown (Chennai), M Lounge (Kochi), Melodia (Manjeri)
- Mixing and mastering – Balu Thankachan (20db Black, Chennai), Midhun Anand (Mindscore Studio, Kochi)
- Mixing assistance – J Paul Daniel
- Artist co-ordination – K. D. Vincent and Don Vincent
- Chief associate – Akhil J Chand
