= Lokah Chapter 1: Chandra (soundtrack) =

2025 soundtrack album by Jakes Bejoy

- Soundtrack album cover

Soundtrack album by Jakes Bejoy
- Released: 12 September 2025
- Recorded: 2025
- Studios: Mindscore Music, Kochi; Pop Media House, Kochi; CAC Studios, Kochi; Soundtown Studios, Chennai
- Genre: Feature film soundtrack
- Length: 21 min 17 s
- Language: Malayalam
- Label: Wayfarer Films

Jakes Bejoy chronology
Narivetta (2025)	Lokah Chapter 1: Chandra (2025)	Vilayath Buddha (2025)

Singles from Lokah Chapter 1: Chandra
- 1. "Thani Lokah Muraari" Released: 19 August 2025; 2. "Shoka Mookam" Released: 3 September 2025; 3. "Queen of the Night" Released: 10 September 2025

Lokah Chapter 1: Chandra is the soundtrack album composed by Jakes Bejoy to the 2025 Malayalam-language superhero film of the same name directed by Dominic Arun and produced by Dulquer Salmaan under Wayfarer Films, starring Kalyani Priyadarshan, along with Naslen, Sandy, Arun Kurian and Chandu Salim Kumar. The album featured five songs written by Mu.Ri, Vinayak Sasikumar, Zeba Tommy, Suhail Koya, Reyan and B. K. Harinarayanan. The album was released through the production company itself on 12 September 2025, fifteen days after the film's original release.

== Background ==
Jakes Bejoy composed the film score and soundtrack in his first collaboration with Dominic Arun. The song Shoka Mookam was composed by JK. The score emphasizes orchestral, tribal and contemporary elements fusing with world music. The music encapsulated elements of folklore bridging traditional and contemporary sounds, while sound design also helped in delivering the intended emotional depth.

Lyricist Harinarayanan had constructed a new language called Mozhika, which blended five different languages to form a separate dialect. According to co-writer Santhy Balachandran, the newly constructed language "captured the philosophy of indigenous folk as custodians of wisdom and protectors of nature". Much of the musical score and lyrics accompany the Mozhika dialect, to reflect the tribal nature.

== Release ==
The promo song "Thani Lokah Murakkaari" was released as the first single on 19 August 2025. The song was performed by Jyoti Nooran, one of the Nooran Sisters in her Malayalam singing debut along with Shillong-based rapper Reble in her Indian playback singing debut. The second song "Shoka Mookam" performed by Benny Dayal, Pranavam Sasi and J'mymah was released on 3 September. The third song "Queen of the Night" written and performed by Zeba Tommy, was released on 10 September. The soundtrack in its entirety was released through the production company on 12 September, two weeks after the film's release.

== Track listing ==
No.	Title	Lyrics	Singer(s)	Length
1.	"Thani Lokah Murakkaari"	Mu.Ri	Jyothi Nooran, Reble	3:51
2.	"Shoka Mookam"	Vinayak Sasikumar	Benny Dayal, Pranavam Sasi, J'mymah	4:08
3.	"Queen of the Night"	Zeba Tommy	Zeba Tommy	3:29
4.	"Neeye Punchiri (One Side Love)"	Suhail Koya, Reyan	Hanan Shaah, Reyan	4:14
5.	"Paranje Paranje"	B. K. Harinarayanan	Anuradha Sriram	5:33
Total length:				21:17

== Reception ==
The New Indian Express wrote "Jakes Bejoy's incredible score swells into something grand and mythical, even if his score feels more conventional in many other stretches". Janani K of India Today wrote "composer Jakes Bejoy's music complemented the film's theme well." Anandu Suresh of The Indian Express wrote "Jakes Bejoy’s music is also spectacular from start to finish, giving the world of Lokah a unique touch." Swathi P Ajith of OnManorama wrote "Jakes Bejoy's music adds another layer to the storytelling, and his score gives several scenes an extra punch." Roopa Radhakrishnan of The Times of India wrote "Jakes Bejoy’s background score is energetic and ethereal, as you would expect the soundtrack of a superhero film to be."

== Background score ==
Lokah Chapter 1: Chandra

Soundtrack album by Jakes Bejoy
- Released: 16 September 2025
- Recorded: 2025
- Studios: Mindscore Music, Kochi; Pop Media House, Kochi; CAC Studios, Kochi; Soundtown Studios, Chennai
- Genre: Feature film score
- Length: 1:08:21
- Language: Malayalam
- Label: Wayfarer Films

The film's original soundtrack consisting of 54 tracks running for one-hour was released on 16 September 2025.

No.	Title	Length
1.	"World of Lokah"	2:29
2.	"Inferno"	1:34
3.	"Organ Mafia 1"	0:52
4.	"Jango Unchained"	0:34
5.	"The Cosmos"	0:40
6.	"Nachiyappa Arrives"	1:26
7.	"She Is Coming"	0:52
8.	"Here She Is"	0:32
9.	"Chandra the Superhero"	1:18
10.	"Bad Cop"	1:16
11.	"Sunny Makes A Move"	1:54
12.	"Naijil 404"	0:56
13.	"Chandra On The Move"	2:22
14.	"Organ Mafia 2"	1:46
15.	"Once Upon A Time"	1:16
16.	"Sacred Terror"	1:28
17.	"The Idol"	0:50
18.	"The Virus"	0:58
19.	"The Caves"	2:24
20.	"Returns Of Neeli – Forest Fight"	4:08
21.	"Neeli's Journey Begins"	1;18
22.	"Kalliyankattu Neeli"	1:02
23.	"Kadamattathu Kathanar"	1:00
24.	"They Live Among Us"	1:08
25.	"Sunny's Options"	0:30
26.	"Supernatural"	1:28
27.	"Sunny's Escape"	0:48
28.	"Sunny's Escape 2"	1:18
29.	"Clues"	1:16
30.	"Neeli and Kathanar"	0:46
31.	"Home Invasion"	0:58
32.	"The Bite"	0:26
33.	"Michael Arrives"	1:04
34.	"Lokah Expands"	0:58
35.	"Nachiyappa Turns"	1:14
36.	"Kathanar's Legacy"	1:02
37.	"Hey Cop!"	2:16
38.	"Charlie's Room"	0:40
39.	"Nachiyappa's Vision"	1:50
40.	"A Doomed Romance"	1:05
41.	"Garuda Force"	0:56
42.	"Ready to Fight"	0:42
43.	"Chandra Rising"	0:30
44.	"The Reckoning"	1:00
45.	"When All Is Lost"	1:16
46.	"Chandra V/s Nachiyappa"	2:00
47.	"What Now?"	1:32
48.	"Sharpshooter"	0:34
49.	"No Damsel in Distress"	1:14
50.	"Goodbye, Sunny"	0:44
51.	"Neeli Reimagined"	1:08
52.	"Charlie Arrives"	1:18
53.	"Lokah – The Unfolding"	1:22
54.	"The Chathans Are Coming"	1:22
Total length:		1:08:21

== Additional music ==
The song "Kiliye Kiliye" sung by S. Janaki from Aa Raathri (1983), which was originally composed by Ilaiyaraaja, and remixed by the independeners (Joyal Joy Francis and Sahul Hameed) is also used in the film as an intro of Kalyani Priyadarshan.

== Personnel ==
Credits adapted from Wayfarer Films:

- Music composer, arranger and producer: Jakes Bejoy
- Music production team: Jakes Bejoy, KC Balasarangan, Aby Tom, Dheeraj Patrickson, Christy Joby, Vinu Uday, Bharath Madhusudhanan, Andrew Gerlicher, Joel Jhons, Maneesh Shaji, Emil Carlton, Gautham Ram, Praveen Ninan, Nikhila Chandran
- Guitars: Anurag Rajeev Nayan, Crispin Netto
- Strings: Cochin Strings (performed by Fracis Xavior, Herald Antony, Danny, Mariadas)
- Brass: Babu
- Orchestra: Budapest Scoring Orchestra
  - Recording studio: Rottenbiller Utca
  - Conductor: Peter Illenyi
  - Session producer: Bálint Sapszon
  - Orchestra Indian representative: Balasubramanian G
  - Recording engineer: Denes Radley
  - Studio assistant: Marcell Rokosz
  - Librarian: Kati Reti
  - Orchestration and session supervisor: Balasubramanian G, Sanjay Ra
- Chorus: Akhil J Chand, Maneeth Manoj, Midhun Anand, Unmesh Unnikrishnan, Nikhilachandran, Don Vincent, Gautham Ram, Milan Joy, Aswin Vijayan, Amal C Ajith, Anila Rajeev, Aavani Malhar, Sony Mohan, Neethusha A C, Ajmal Fatima Parveen, Himna Hilary, Amritha Rahul
- Live rhythms: Kallyan, Sandeep Venkitesh, Bineesh Balan
- Session arrangement and management: Maneeth Manoj & Maneesh Shaji
- Pre-mixing: Midhun Anand
- Chief associate: Akhil J Chand
- Recording studios: Mindscore Music (Kochi), Pop Media House (Kochi), CAC Studios (Kochi), Sound Town Studios (Kochi)
- Engineers: Midhun Anand, Unmesh Unnikrishnan, Jisto George, Nikhil Mathews, Sankeerth Shaji
- Artist co-ordination: Don Vincent, K D Vincent
- Studio staff: Tintu Thankachan, Shafeeq Khader
