= They Call Him OG (soundtrack) =

2025 soundtrack album by Thaman S

- Soundtrack album cover

Soundtrack album by Thaman S
- Released: 21 September 2025
- Recorded: 2024–2025
- Genre: Feature film soundtrack
- Length: 19:26
- Languages: Telugu; English; Japanese
- Label: Sony Music India
- Producer: Thaman S

Thaman S chronology
Jaat (2025)	They Call Him OG (2025)	Telusu Kada (2025)
External audio
- They Call Him OG – Audio Jukebox on YouTube

Singles from They Call Him OG
- 1. "Firestorm" Released: 2 August 2025; 2. "Suvvi Suvvi" Released: 27 August 2025; 3. "Trance of Omi" Released: 11 September 2025; 4. "Guns N' Roses" Released: 15 September 2025; 5. "Washi Yo Washi" Released: 19 September 2025

They Call Him OG is the soundtrack album composed by Thaman S to the 2025 Telugu-language period action crime film of the same name, written and directed by Sujeeth starring Pawan Kalyan, Emraan Hashmi, Priyanka Mohan, Arjun Das, Sriya Reddy and Prakash Raj. The album features six songs with lyrics written by Vishwa Vemuri, Srinivasa Mouli, Kalyan Chakravarthy Tripuraneni, Raghu Ram, Harsha Darivemula, Adviteeya Vojjala, Raja Kumari and Sujeeth himself. The soundtrack was preceded by five singles before the album's release on 21 September 2025 under the Sony Music India label.

== Development ==
The film score and soundtrack were composed by Thaman S in his first collaboration with Sujeeth and fourth with Kalyan after Vakeel Saab (2021), Bheemla Nayak (2022) and Bro (2023). Thaman S joined the project in January 2023 and started composing for the film the following month. Speaking to Aditya Devulapally of The New Indian Express, Thaman said "For the music comparison coming out with Tamil films, OG will be our answer to that, from Telugu cinema". Thaman S had composed 6–7 songs for the film as well as 30–40 background score cues, in the two years of music production process. Thaman reportedly went with a Michael Jackson-style of mixing for the film's score, to provide a rock feel for the low vocals and also collaborated with Japanese musicians for the score due to the film's Japanese connection.

The album accompanies a variety of singers and lyricists, with songs in Telugu, English and Japanese lyrics. In April 2025, actor Silambarasan had recorded the song "Firestorm" for the film, who noted it as a "dream come true" moment on singing for Kalyan. In September, Thaman recorded the film score at the Abbey Road Studios, London collaborating with 117 musicians for the orchestra.

== Release ==
The film's music rights were acquired by Sony Music India. The first single, titled "Firestorm" was released on 2 August 2025. The second single, titled "Suvvi Suvvi" was released on 27 August. The third single titled "Trance Of Omi" was released on 11 September. The fourth single titled "Guns N' Roses" was released on 15 September. The fifth single titled "Washi Yo Washi" which was a Japanese haiku was released on 19 September. The film's soundtrack was released on 21 September at the pre-release event held at Lal Bahadur Shastri Stadium, Hyderabad.

== Track listing ==
=== Telugu ===
Track Listing
No.	Title	Lyrics	Singer(s)	Length
1.	"Firestorm"	Vishwa Vemuri, Srinivasa Mouli, Raja Kumari, Adviteeya Vojjala	Thaman S, Silambarasan TR, Raja Kumari, Deepak Blue, Nazeeruddin, Bharathraj R	4:00
2.	"Suvvi Suvvi"	Kalyan Chakravarthy Tripuraneni	Sruthi Ranjani	4:35
3.	"Guns N' Roses"	Vishwa Vemuri, Adviteeya Vojjala, Raghuram	Harsha Darivemula	4:13
4.	"Trance of Omi"	Adviteeya Vojjala, Harsha Darivemula	Harsha Darivemula, Sruthi Ranjani, Adviteeya Vojjala, Pranati, Sruthika, Pratyusha, Girija, Soujanya	2:47
5.	"Hungry Cheetah"	Raghuram	Prudhvi Chandra, Arun Kaundinya, Ritesh G Rao, Sai Charan, Saketh Komanduri, Adviteeya Vojjala, Raghuram & Sri Krishna, Pratyusha, Pranathi, Nada Priya, Lakshmi Meghana, Sahiti Chaganti, Ramya Behera, Harini Ivaturi, Satya Yamini & Maneesha	1:59
6.	"Washi Yo Washi"	Sujeeth	Pawan Kalyan	1:52
Total length:				19:26

Extended Soundtrack
No.	Title	Lyrics	Singer(s)	Length
1.	"Kiss Kiss Bang Bang"	Sreejo	Madhubanti Bagchi, Kumara Vagdevi, Soha	4:17
2.	"In the Streets of Fire"	–	Harsha Darivemula	1:54
3.	"Let's Go Johnny"	Ramana Gogula	Ramana Gogula	0:57

=== Hindi ===
Track Listing
No.	Title	Lyrics	Singer(s)	Length
1.	"Firestorm"	Raqueeb Alam, Raja Kumari, Adviteeya Vojjala	Thaman S, Silambarasan TR, Raja Kumari, Deepak Blue, Nazeeruddin, Bharathraj R	4:00
2.	"Apsara Tu Apsara"	M. Prasad Babu	Sruthi Ranjani	4:35
3.	"Guns N' Roses"	M. Prasad Babu, Adviteeya Vojjala	Ritesh G Rao, Saatvik G Rao	4:13
4.	"Trance of Omi"	Adviteeya Vojjala, Harsha Darivemula	Harsha Darivemula, Sruthi Ranjani, Adviteeya Vojjala, Pranati, Sruthika, Pratyusha, Girija, Soujanya	2:47
5.	"Hungry Cheetah"	Ritesh G Rao	Prudhvi Chandra, Arun Kaundinya, Ritesh G Rao, Sai Charan, Saketh Komanduri, Adviteeya Vojjala, Raghuram & Sri Krishna, Pratyusha, Pranathi, Nada Priya, Lakshmi Meghana, Sahiti Chaganti, Ramya Behera, Harini Ivaturi, Satya Yamini & Maneesha	1:59
6.	"Washi Yo Washi"	Sujeeth	Pawan Kalyan	1:52
Total length:				19:26

Extended Soundtrack
No.	Title	Lyrics	Singer(s)	Length
1.	"Kiss Kiss Bang Bang"	M. Prasad Babu	Sanjana Kalmanje, Soha, Madhubanti Bagchi	4:17
2.	"In the Streets of Fire"	–	Harsha Darivemula	1:54
3.	"Let's Go Johnny"	Ramana Gogula	Ramana Gogula	0:57

== Background score ==
They Call Him OG

Film score by Thaman S
- Released: 16 November 2025
- Recorded: 2024–2025
- Studios: Abbey Road Studios, London
- Genre: Film score
- Length: 95:36
- Language: Telugu • Hindustani • Japanese
- Label: Sony Music South
- Producer: Thaman S

Thaman S chronology
Jaat (2025)	They Call Him OG (2025)	Telusu Kada (2025)
External audio
- They Call Him OG – Original Background Score on YouTube

No.	Title	Length
1.	"The Black Dragon Society"	1:51
2.	"A New Beginning: Bombay"	0:54
3.	"The Pirates Raid"	1:24
4.	"The Rise of Ojas Gambheera"	2:16
5.	"The Evil: Jimmy"	1:07
6.	"The Sorrow of Satya Dada"	1:22
7.	"The OG's Katana"	0:37
8.	"The Blood Dance of OG"	4:22
9.	"The Guardian"	1:39
10.	"After The Storm"	1:41
11.	"Deadly Katana"	2:01
12.	"Mumbai Storm"	4:00
13.	"OG's Kanmani"	2:14
14.	"The Orchestral: Suvvi Suvvi"	6:15
15.	"Sensei Gambheera"	1:38
16.	"Who Are You?"	0:57
17.	"Naam Hai Uska Omi"	1:28
18.	"A Father's Tale"	3:22
19.	"Jimmy's Night"	2:07
20.	"Omi's in the Town"	1:34
21.	"Cries of the Port"	4:33
22.	"The Return of Gambheera"	5:31
23.	"Kanmani: Farewell"	3:13
24.	"OG's Stance"	1:44
25.	"OG Returns to Bombay"	1:38
26.	"Police Station Rampage (Part 1)"	0:48
27.	"Police Station Rampage (Part 2)"	1:40
28.	"Geetha's Rescue"	3:26
29.	"Gangster and His Guns"	1:27
30.	"OG Ka Faisla"	2:26
31.	"Arjun's Blood Oath"	1:28
32.	"Only Gambheera's Law"	1:49
33.	"A Storm Is Coming"	2:18
34.	"Gambheera's Sacrifice"	3:23
35.	"The Hunger of Cheetah"	3:29
36.	"Echoes of Kanmani"	1:38
37.	"The Samurai and The Nine"	2:18
38.	"Orochi Genshin"	4:50
39.	"A Husband's Promise"	1:41
40.	"Memories of Kanmani"	3:03
Total length:		95:35

== Critical reception ==
Swaroop Kodur of The Indian Express wrote, "Thaman's background score is the mainstay all along, revving things up very effectively with his blaring electronica and not letting the generic writing get in the way." Sangeetha Devi Dundoo of The Hindu noted Thaman's background score being "high-on-energy". Janani K. of India Today wrote "After Sujeeth and Pawan Kalyan, it is Thaman who makes 'OG' a paisa-vasool masala entertainer," calling the score as "chest-thumping".

Divya Shree of The Times of India wrote, "Thaman's rousing soundtrack, however, injects energy into the action sequences." Arjun Menon of Rediff.com wrote, "Thaman is the backbone of this film. He understands the fan assignment and complements Sujeeth's scattershot vision. His musical score is the missing emotional tissue that binds the film's core themes with the sophistication that the writing lacks. Thaman's score is sensitive to the evolving ludicrousness of the material and energises certain sequences."

Aditya Devulapally of Cinema Express wrote, "Thaman, bless him, is the lone man fighting for a cause. His score is the only place where East meets West, where samurai edges blend with rock riffs, where mass energy breathes. He gives the film life, and the film returns the favour by ignoring him. His music tries to lift the film, but there's nothing for it to land on. It is like an ornate katana that nobody wields." Hariprasad Sadanandan of The Week wrote "SS Thaman's background score is a major factor in elevating some of the sequences while the action blocks have also come out well."

== Controversy ==
Despite the praise for the soundtrack, Thaman was criticised for plagiarism of the song "Lumi Une" from Irkenc Hyca for "Trance of Omi".

== Personnel ==
Credits adapted from Sony Music South:

- Music composer, arranger, producer and programming – Thaman S
- Additional programming – Shashank Alamuru, Osho Venkat, Hari SR
- Beats, EDM works – Beyond Sound, The Gongura Band
- Moog gated synths – Thaman S
- Mongolian flute, vocoder – Naveen Kumar
- Hukaido taiko, war drums – Anandan Sivamani
- Nagado, hirado drums – Thamania
- Nakoda, Japanese drums – Sivamani
- Japanese koto, guzhen – Subhani
- Cello, viola, electric violin – Sandilya
- Electric guitars – Subhani, Subashree, Sunny
- Guitars, mandolin – Tapas Roy
- Bass guitar – Sunny
- Strings – Chennai Strings Orchestra
- Strings performed by – Kalyan Sundaram, Imam, Balachandar, Yenson, Babji, Selva P. Ravi Vijayendran, Jeychandran, Dhaneskar, Fagan, Visal Roshan, Sastry, Samyal Rao, Vignesh, Balaji A, Harsha, Chandru, Vinay Kumar, Hemanth, Ramana PV, Vijay Bhaskar, Cyril, Venkatesh, Gopinath, Sekar, Visi, Seenu, Selvaraj, Prabhakar, Ravi
- Strings conductor – Ravi Raghav
- String arrangements – Prabhakar
- Harmonies – Deepak Blue, Aravind Srinivas, Abhijith Rao, Akash Ravikumar, Vikram Pity, Sai Vignesh, Sai Charan, Aravind Annest, Shridhar Ramesh, Balaji Sri, Vignesh Narayanan, Sudharsan Ram, Bharath Raj, Nazeeruddin, Saketh Komanduri, Prudhvi, Arun Ritesh, Saatvik, Bhavani Shridhar, Yadu Krishnan, Ishan Rojindar, Shravan
- Chorus – Sahithi Chaganti, Sruthi Ranjani, Adviteeya Vojjala, Pranati, Sruthika, Pratyusha, Girija, Soujanya
- Vocal supervision – Adviteeya Vojjala, Thaman S
- Recording – Pradeep Menon (AM Studios, Chennai), Hari S R (Vibe Studios, Hyderabad), Osho Venkat (V Studios, Chennai)
- Mixing and mastering – Shadab Rayeen (New Edge Studios, Mumbai and New Edge, California)
- Mixing assistance – Anoop Jazbaat, Prasad, Sohamm, Rupam, Kundan
- Musicians' coordinator – Manikandan K
- Studio manager – Seenu, Sridhar
- Studio assistance – Raju, Kannan, Lingam, Pawan
