= Hebbuli Cut =

Indian Kannada-language drama film

- Theatrical release poster
- Directed by: Bheemarao
- Written by: Bheemarao; Anantha Shandreya
- Produced by: Bheemarao; Pramodini R. Rudrayya; Karna Maladakal; Mohan Karate
- Starring: Mounesh Nataranga; Ananya Niharika; Mahadev Hadapad; Uma Y. G.; Punith Shetty; Vinaya Mahadevan; Mahantesh Hiremath
- Cinematography: Deepak Yaragera
- Edited by: Ashe Prajwal
- Music by: Navaneeth Sham
- Production company: Saara Film's
- Distributed by: KRG Studios
- Release date: 4 July 2025
- Running time: 110 minutes
- Country: India
- Language: Kannada

Hebbuli Cut is a 2025 Indian Kannada-language drama film directed by Bheemarao in his directorial debut. The film stars Mounesh Nataranga, Ananya Niharika, Mahadev Hadapad, Uma Y. G., Punith Shetty, Vinaya Mahadevan, and Mahantesh Hiremath.

== Cast ==
- Mounesh Nataranga as Vinaya
- Ananya Niharika as Rekha
- Mahadev Hadapad as Mallanna, Vinaya's father
- Uma Y. G. as Kanaka, Vinaya's mother
- Punith Shetty as Rafeeq
- Vinaya Mahadevan as Basavan Gowda
- Mahantesh Hiremath as Channa
- Sarvesh Gouduru
- Preetam
- Dingri Naresh
- Mahantesh Yaramaras

== Music ==
The music was composed by Navaneeth Sham.

Track listing
No.	Title	Lyrics	Singer(s)	Length
1.	"Disco Kalla"	—	Azim Naza	4:17
2.	"Badava Rap"	Sanju YBH	Sanju YBH	3:04
3.	"Haadu Hagalalle"	Sampath Sirimane	Keerthan Holla	4:01
Total length:				11:22

== Release ==
Hebbuli Cut was released theatrically on 4 July 2025.

=== Critical reception ===
Susmita Sameera of The Times of India rated the film 3.5/5 stars and wrote, "It makes you laugh, tugs at your heart, and holds up a mirror to society’s harsh truths—all without losing its emotional grip. Despite its realism, it remains thoroughly engaging and entertaining." Giving the same rating, Pranati A. S. of Deccan Herald wrote, "While the film makes interesting observations, it fails to build a compelling narrative. To its credit, ‘Hebbuli Cut’ is not preachy — it holds a mirror to society and examines how propaganda drives people."

A. Sharadhaa of Cinema Express gave the film 3.5/5 stars and wrote, "An intimate movie with a generous heart, Hebbuli Cut doesn't demand change but rather gently reveals the need for it". Subha J. Rao of The News Minute wrote, "This is probably one of those very rare Kannada films that speak about caste without couching it in pleasant, acceptable language. But, to its credit, it does so without being preachy."

Swaroop Kodur of The Indian Express gave the film 3.5/5 stars and wrote, "Hebbuli Cut has lots of insights to offer as it bats defiantly for the underdog/marginalised, and still manages to be thoroughly entertaining." Vivek M. V. of The Hindu wrote, "Director Bheemrao’s Kannada film, starring Mounesh Nataranga, is a rare attempt that never forgets to engage even as it conveys harsh truths".

Prathibha Joy of OTTPlay gave the film 3.5/5 stars and wrote, "An engaging and entertaining take on a social injustice with barely any melodrama makes Hebbuli Cut a good watch. That there’s no clear resolution in the end may frustrate those looking for a solid payoff, but that doesn’t seem to be the filmmaker’s intention." Critics from Vijayavani and Prajavani gave the film positive reviews.
