= Patang (2025 film) =

2025 Indian Telugu film by Praneeth Prattipati

- Theatrical release poster
- Directed by: Praneeth Prattipati
- Written by: Praneeth Prattipati
- Produced by: Vijay Sekhar Anne; Sampath Maka; Suresh Reddy Kothinti
- Starring: Preethi Pagadala; Vamsi Pujit; Pranav Kaushik
- Cinematography: Shakthi Arvind
- Edited by: Chanakya Reddy Toorupu
- Music by: Jose Jimmy
- Production companies: Cinematic Elements; Rishaan Cinemas; Monsoon Tales Banner; Suresh Productions
- Release date: 25 December 2025
- Running time: 160 minutes
- Country: India
- Language: Telugu

Patang (transl. Kite) is a 2025 Indian Telugu-language sports comedy drama film written and directed by Praneeth Prattipati. The film stars Preethi Pagadala, Vamsi Pujit, and Pranav Kaushik.

The film was released on 25 December 2025.

== Plot ==
Vishnu Krishna alias Whiskey and ‘Class’ Arun are childhood friends even though they come from contrasting backgrounds. Their friendship faces a test when Aishwarya enters their lives. She grows closer to Arun, while Whisky too develops feelings for her. Differences arise, leading the friends to devise a plan to decide who should be with Aishwarya. Whisky and Arun enter a kite-flying competition and the winner gets to be with Aishwarya.

== Cast ==
- Preethi Pagadala as Aishwarya
- Vamsi Pujit as Whisky
- Pranav Kaushik as Arun
- Gaurav Sunil as Pencil
- Rajeshwar Vemula as Shiva
- Vishal Silveru as Rambo
- Venkatesh as Basha
- Vishika as Lakshmi
- Pamu Vignani as Aditi, Arun's younger sister
- Kivish Kautilya as Kiwi
- Vadlamani Srinivas as Babai
- S. P. Charan as Shekar, Arun's father
- Anu Hasan as Shekar's wife
- Gautham Vasudev Menon in a guest appearance as himself
- S. S. Kanchi in a guest appearance as a sponsor
- Vishnu Oi as Commentator

== Music ==
The background score and songs were composed by Jose Jimmy. T-Series acquired the audio rights.

Track listing
No.	Title	Lyrics	Singer(s)	Length
1.	"Hey Hello Namasthe"	Sri Mani	Shankar Mahadevan	4:43
2.	"Andala Tarakasi"	Sri Mani	Jassie Gift, M. M. Manasi	4:03
3.	"Hawa Hawa"	Jose Jimmy	Jose Jimmy	3:30
4.	"Emosanal Drama"	Sri Mani	Anthony Daasan, Sahithi Chaganti	4:15
5.	"Oh Ranga"	Praneeth Prattipati	Mano	4:14
6.	"Tai Tai Tai"	Sri Mani	Shakthisree Gopalan	4:28
7.	"Manjha - Vibe Of Patang"	–	Jose Jimmy	1:53
8.	"Athara Buthara"	Jose Jimmy	Taruni Potnuru	1:24
9.	"Rama Rama"	Jose Jimmy	Yashwanth Nag	2:17

== Release and reception ==
Patang was released on 25 December 2025. The film was initially stated to be released in December 2024, but was delayed due to CGI works.

Dheeraj of Filmy Focus rated the film 3.5/5 and wrote that "Patang charms with its fresh take on a familiar love triangle, strong performances, lively music, and clean humor" Jeevi of Idlebrain.com rated the film 3/5 and wrote that, "Patang is a refreshing watch, reminiscent of Sekhar Kammula’s early films, but presented with a more vibrant touch". NTV rated it 3 out 5 and noted the performances of lead actors. Shreya Varanasi of The Times of India rated the film 2.5 out of 5 and opined that "more focused screenplay and crisper editing would have made the film more effective and emotionally rewarding". Telugucinema.com also gave the same rating and stated, "While the stretched narrative and familiar narrative dilute the impact, the film still offers decent entertainment through its comedy".
