= Kantara: Chapter 1 (soundtrack) =

2025 soundtrack album by B. Ajaneesh Loknath

- Soundtrack album cover

Soundtrack album by B. Ajaneesh Loknath
- Released: 11 October 2025
- Recorded: 2023–2025
- Genres: ABBS Studios, Bengaluru; Prabhath Studios, Bengaluru; Rottenblier Studios, Budapest
- Length: 27:23
- Languages: Kannada; Tulu
- Label: Hombale Films
- Producers: B. Ajaneesh Loknath; C. R. Bobby

B. Ajaneesh Loknath chronology
Just Married (2025)	Kantara: Chapter 1 (2025)	Devil (2025)

Kantara: Chapter 1 is the soundtrack album composed by B. Ajaneesh Loknath for the 2025 Kannada-language epic period mythological action drama film of the same name, directed by Rishab Shetty, starring Shetty himself, along with Jayaram, Rukmini Vasanth and Gulshan Devaiah. The lyrics were written by Shasiraj Kavoor, Trilok Trivikrama and Pramod Maravanthe. The album featured seven songs and was released on 11 October 2025.

== Development ==
B. Ajaneesh Loknath who composed music for Kantara (2022) returned for the prequel. Like all of his films, he also produced the film's music with his wife C. R. Bobby. Loknath stated that when the prequel began production, expectations were high for both the film's story and its music, and the sound entirely aligned with his vision which he translated through music. The album accompanied five songs which did not share a direct reference and born entirely from the visuals and situations.

Working on Chapter 1, Loknath extensively researched on the periodic music which he felt fascinating to study how music existed 1000 years ago before Carnatic music being fully organized. Much of the compositions were inspired from mantras, with full focus on ancient instruments such as veena, mridangam and nadaswaram, and the alap that reflected Carnatic traditions. The music was carefully organized in order to blend Carnatic music with tribal and folk rhythms. Loknath associated with temple musicians and Carnatic classical experts to maintain authenticity for the sounds that passed down generations. On composing the background score, Loknath denoted that the scale and grandeur demanded earthy folk music, with character arcs and geography shaping the compositions.

Bobby also acknowledged that understanding the pulse of the film is essential for a composer, adding Loknath's music is in sync with Rishab's tempo as the heartbeat of the narrative. She added that working on the film "felt almost divine, as if God guided us to create the music" and complemented Rishab's and producer Vijay Kiragandur's efforts to bring the story, noting it that the two of them helped to shape every note and nuance of the soundtrack.

The song "Brahmakalasha", which was presented in the structure of viruttam, illustrated the process of the kumbha abhishekam with "every community honours Lord Shiva, tonalities and expressions of devotion vary. This is reflected in the lyrics and composition." The song accompanied Sanskrit, Tulu and Kannada lyrics, becoming more ancient and layered and serves as the significant purpose for this film as well. Its singer Abby V recorded the song in parts of San Francisco, Dubai and Los Angeles. Actor Diljit Dosanjh recorded the Hindi version of "Rebel Song" as he liked the first film. He also shot for a promo video for the song with Rishab. "Varaha Roopam", "Rebel Song" and "Karma Song" which was featured in the first film was also included in the prequel.

== Release ==
The first single "Brahmakalasha" was released on 27 September 2025. The second single "Rebel Song" was released on 1 October 2025. The soundtrack album was released on 11 October 2025, nine days after the film's release.

== Track listing ==
Kannada
No.	Title	Lyrics	Singer(s)	Length
1.	"Kantara: Chapter 1" (Trailer Theme)	Instrumental	–	2:56
2.	"Brahmakalasha"	Shasiraj Kavoor	Abby V	5:43
3.	"Rebel Song"	Trilok Trivikrama	Mime Ramdas	3:58
4.	"Madana Mana Mohini"	Pramod Maravanthe	Vijay Prakash, Ananya Bhat	3:40
5.	"Agriculture Song"	Shasiraj Kavoor	Mime Ramdas	2:26
6.	"Karma Song"	Trilok Trivikrama	Venkatesh D. C.	4:00
7.	"Varaha Roopam"	Shasiraj Kavoor	Sai Vignesh	4:36
Total length:				27:23

Hindi
No.	Title	Lyrics	Singer(s)	Length
1.	"Kantara: Chapter 1" (Trailer Theme)	Instrumental	–	2:56
2.	"Brahmakalasha"	Juno	Abby V	5:43
3.	"Rebel Song"	Juno	Diljit Dosanjh	3:58
4.	"Mann Mohini"	Juno	Vijay Prakash, Harshika Devanath	3:40
5.	"Agriculture Song"	Arafat Mohamood	Shatadru Kabir	2:24
6.	"Karma Song"	Juno	Venkatesh D. C.	4:03
7.	"Varaha Roopam"	Shasiraj Kavoor	Sai Vignesh	4:36
Total length:				27:24

Telugu
No.	Title	Lyrics	Singer(s)	Length
1.	"Kantara: Chapter 1" (Trailer Theme)	Instrumental	–	2:56
2.	"Brahmakalasha"	Krishna Kanth	Abby V	5:43
3.	"Rebel Song"	Krishna Kanth	Kaala Bhairava	3:59
4.	"Raave Ika Priya Bhamini"	Krishna Kanth	Anurag Kulkarni, Chinmayi	3:40
5.	"Agriculture Song"	Rambabu Gosala	Arun Kaundinya	2:24
6.	"Karma Song"	Rambabu Gosala	Venkatesh D. C.	4:03
7.	"Varaha Roopam"	Shasiraj Kavoor	Sai Vignesh	4:36
Total length:				27:25

Tamil
No.	Title	Lyrics	Singer(s)	Length
1.	"Kantara: Chapter 1" (Trailer Theme)	Instrumental	–	2:56
2.	"Brahmakalasha"	Madhan Karky	Abby V	5:43
3.	"Rebel Song"	Palani Bharathi	Muthu Sirpi	3:59
4.	"Vaenguzhalil Ezhaindayadi"	Madhan Karky	K. S. Harisankar, Chinmayi	3:40
5.	"Agriculture Song"	Sankarakumar P. S.	Muthu Sirpi	2:24
6.	"Karma Song"	Sankarakumar P. S.	Venkatesh D. C.	4:03
7.	"Varaha Roopam"	Shasiraj Kavoor	Sai Vignesh	4:36
Total length:				27:25

Malayalam
No.	Title	Lyrics	Singer(s)	Length
1.	"Kantara: Chapter 1" (Trailer Theme)	Instrumental	–	2:56
2.	"Brahmakalasha"	Santhosh Varma	K. S. Harisankar	5:43
3.	"Rebel Song"	Santhosh Varma	Sannidhanandhan	3:59
4.	"Madana Mana Mohini"	Santhosh Varma	K. S. Harisankar, Harshika Devanath	3:40
5.	"Agriculture Song"	Santhosh Varma	Sannidhanandhan	2:24
6.	"Karma Song"	Santhosh Varma	Venkatesh D. C.	4:03
7.	"Varaha Roopam"	Shasiraj Kavoor	Sai Vignesh	4:36
Total length:				27:25

== Background score ==
Kantara: Chapter 1

Film score by B. Ajaneesh Loknath
- Released: 24 March 2026
- Recorded: 2023–2025
- Genre: Film score
- Length: 52:49
- Languages: Kannada; Tulu
- Label: Hombale Films
- Producer: B. Ajaneesh Loknath

No.	Title	Length
1.	"Arrival of Panjurli"	1:14
2.	"Mayakaara and the Young Berme"	1:18
3.	"Path to Eshwarana Hoodota"	2:00
4.	"Baidhi and the Stone"	1:05
5.	"Kulashekara – The Melodic Menace"	0:48
6.	"The Tiger"	2:44
7.	"Clash in the Forest"	1:00
8.	"Chavundi"	0:58
9.	"Wrath of Kantara"	0:51
10.	"Birth of Berme"	1:02
11.	"Guliga Theme"	2:27
12.	"Silence Before War"	1:32
13.	"Berme and Rajashekara"	0:40
14.	"Berme's Anger"	0:44
15.	"Booba on High"	1:24
16.	"The Black Magic"	0:36
17.	"Entry of Kanakavathi"	0:51
18.	"Entry to the Jungle – Comedy of Errors"	1:30
19.	"Blood & Steel"	1:04
20.	"First Sight of the Temple"	0:40
21.	"The War Call"	1:20
22.	"Journey – In the Well"	2:02
23.	"Mourning"	0:31
24.	"Kulashekara's Confrontation"	1:48
25.	"Romantic Kulashekara"	1:22
26.	"Teasing Kulashekara"	0:59
27.	"The Bee Attack"	0:45
28.	"Channa's Love"	0:38
29.	"The Entry of Berme"	2:22
30.	"The Battle for the Forest"	0:43
31.	"Love at First Sight"	1:06
32.	"Wild Mischief"	0:50
33.	"The Mayakaara"	0:54
34.	"Villains on the Warpath"	0:57
35.	"The War Planning"	1:42
36.	"The Wall Has Fallen"	0:36
37.	"Chaos Unleashed"	0:42
38.	"King's Malice"	0:54
39.	"Pepe Music"	1:03
40.	"After the Massacre"	0:46
41.	"Baidi, The Mother"	0:44
42.	"Kanakavathi Enters the Forest"	0:34
43.	"Kanakavathi's Mind Game"	1:34
44.	"Rise of the Village"	0:42
45.	"Invoking the Ancestors"	0:53
46.	"The Call of Ullaya"	1:54
Total length:		52:49

== Reception ==
Sanjay Ponnappa of India Today wrote "Starting with Ajaneesh Loknath's music: when 'Kantara' released in 2022, the song 'Varaha Roopam' went instantly viral, and the melodious 'Singara Siriye' captured everyone's hearts. Such virality may be missing this time, but that doesn't make the music any less remarkable. It's truly enchanting, allowing one to lose themselves in the world of Kantara. Viral or not, Ajaneesh's music is simply brilliant." Vivek M. V. of The Hindu noted that in the "Brahmakalasha" song, "[the] underlying tension between the tribals and royals hits its zenith" while "Rebel Song" is considered as the "rousing battle theme".

A. Sharadhaa of The New Indian Express wrote "The songs, background score, and sound design by Ajaneesh Loknath—with tribal signals, chants, and rhythmic percussion—move with the film's flow." Kashvi Raj Singh of News18 wrote "The heart of Kantara: Chapter 1 is its music (B Ajaneesh Loknath) and visual teams. The background score and the use of classical music to drive scenes are brilliant." Saibal Chatterjee of NDTV wrote "music director Ajaneesh Loknath's background score hits the high notes all through the nearly three-hour film". Arjun Menon of Rediff.com wrote "Ajaneesh Loknath triumphs yet again with a thumping score that uses prayers, chants and concealed anguish to exemplify the action blocks."

In a negative review, Pranati A S of Deccan Herald wrote "It looks like Ajaneesh Loknath has only rehashed the background score from the first part. And to play it continuously for close to three hours is unpardonable". Anandu Suresh of The Indian Express wrote "Compared to the previous instalment, B Ajaneesh Loknath's music misses the mark this time, though there are a few instances, particularly in the high-octane action sequences, where his talents stand out."

== Personnel ==
- Music composer: B. Ajaneesh Loknath
- Music production, recording, mixing and mastering: B. Ajaneesh Loknath, C. R. Bobby
- Music consultant (Carnatic classical): Smt. Lalitha Rukmini
- Nadaswaram: D. Balasubramaniam
- Rhythms: Kalyan Chakravarthy
- Live rhythms: Shruthi Ranjani
- Orchestral arrangements: Sanjay RA, Balasubramanian G.
- Choir: Satvik S Rao, Abhishek M R, Narahari Achar, Bhargav H C, Skandesh, Bharath Mallad
- Choir arrangements and conductor: Aniruddha Sastry
- Strings and brass: Budapest Scoring Orchestra
- Orchestra conductor: Peter Illenyi
- Orchestra Indian representative: Balasubramanian G
- Session producer: Bálint Sapszon
- Orchestra recording: Viktor Sazbo at Rottenbiller Studios, Budapest
- Librarian: Agnes Sapszon, Kati Reti
- Orchestrators: Balasubramanian G, Sanjay RA, Abishek Vishwanathan
- Protools editor: Abin Ponnachan
- Vocal recording: Ashwin Prabhath, Rangaswamy P at Prabhath Studios, Bangalore
