= Thandel (soundtrack) =

2025 soundtrack album by Devi Sri Prasad

- Soundtrack album cover

Soundtrack album by Devi Sri Prasad
- Recorded: 2024–2025
- Genre: Feature film soundtrack
- Length: 16:36
- Language: Telugu
- Label: Aditya Music
- Producer: Devi Sri Prasad

Devi Sri Prasad chronology
Pushpa 2: The Rule (2024)	Thandel (2025)	Kuberaa (2025)
External audio
- Official Audio Jukebox on YouTube

Singles from Thandel
- 1. "Bujji Thalli" Released: 21 November 2024; 2. "Namo Namah Shivaya" Released: 4 January 2025; 3. "Hilesso Hilessa" Released: 23 January 2025; 4. "Aazaadi" Released: 6 February 2025

Thandel is the soundtrack album composed by Devi Sri Prasad for the 2025 Indian Telugu-language film of the same name. The album consists of six songs with Sri Mani and Jonnavittula Ramalingeswara Rao penning the lyrics. The songs were released through Aditya Music. "Bujji Thalli", "Namo Namah Shivaya" and "Hilesso Hilessa" songs are commercially successful. The first song "Bujji Thalli" was charted on Billboard India Songs and UK Asian Music Chart.

== Background and release ==
Devi Sri Prasad was roped in for his first collaboration with the director Chandoo Mondeti. The first single "Bujji Thalli", a romantic melody, was released on 21 November 2024. The next song "Namo Namah Shivaya", a devotional track, was supposed to release on 22 December 2024, but was released on 4 January 2025 due to production delays. The third single "Hilesso Hilessa" was released on 23 January 2025. "Aazaadi", a patriotic song, was released on 6 February 2025, a day before the film's release. All the songs were also released in Tamil and Hindi languages for the film's respective dubbed versions.

== Track listing ==
Telugu
No.	Title	Lyrics	Singer(s)	Length
1.	"Bujji Thalli"	Sri Mani	Javed Ali	4:34
2.	"Namo Namah Shivaya"	Jonnavittula Ramalingeswara Rao	Anurag Kulkarni, Haripriya	4:58
3.	"Hilesso Hilessa"	Sri Mani	Nakash Aziz, Shreya Ghoshal	3:49
4.	"Aazaadi"	Sri Mani	Nakul Abhyankar	3:55
Total length:				16:36

All lyrics are written by Sri Mani.

Extended soundtrack
No.	Title	Singer(s)	Length
5.	"Bujji Thalli (Happy Version)"	Sameera Bharadwaj	1:36
6.	"Bujji Thalli (Sad Version)"	Javed Ali	2:19

All lyrics are written by Viveka.

Tamil
No.	Title	Singer(s)	Length
1.	"Bujji Kutty"	Javed Ali	4:34
2.	"Namo Namah Shivaya"	Mahalingam VM, Haripriya	4:58
3.	"Hilessa"	Sarath Santosh, Haripriya	3:49
4.	"Aazaadi"	Nakul Abhyankar	3:55
Total length:			16:36

All lyrics are written by Raqueeb Alam.

Hindi
No.	Title	Singer(s)	Length
1.	"Champa Kali"	Javed Ali	4:34
2.	"Namo Namah Shivaya"	Divya Kumar, Saloni Thakkar	4:58
3.	"Hilesso Hilessa"	Nakash Aziz, Shreya Ghoshal	3:49
4.	"Aazaadi"	Nakul Abhyankar	3:55
Total length:			16:36

== Reception ==
Jeevi of Idlebrain stated that, "Devi Sri Prasad’s music serves as the soul of the film". Sangeetha Devi Dundoo of The Hindu opined that the music is the film's "emotional anchor". With a similar opinion, ABP's Satay Pulagam wrote in his review that "Devi Sri Prasad’s music is the film’s backbone".
