= Venu Udugula =

Indian film director, poet, and screenwriter (born 1983)

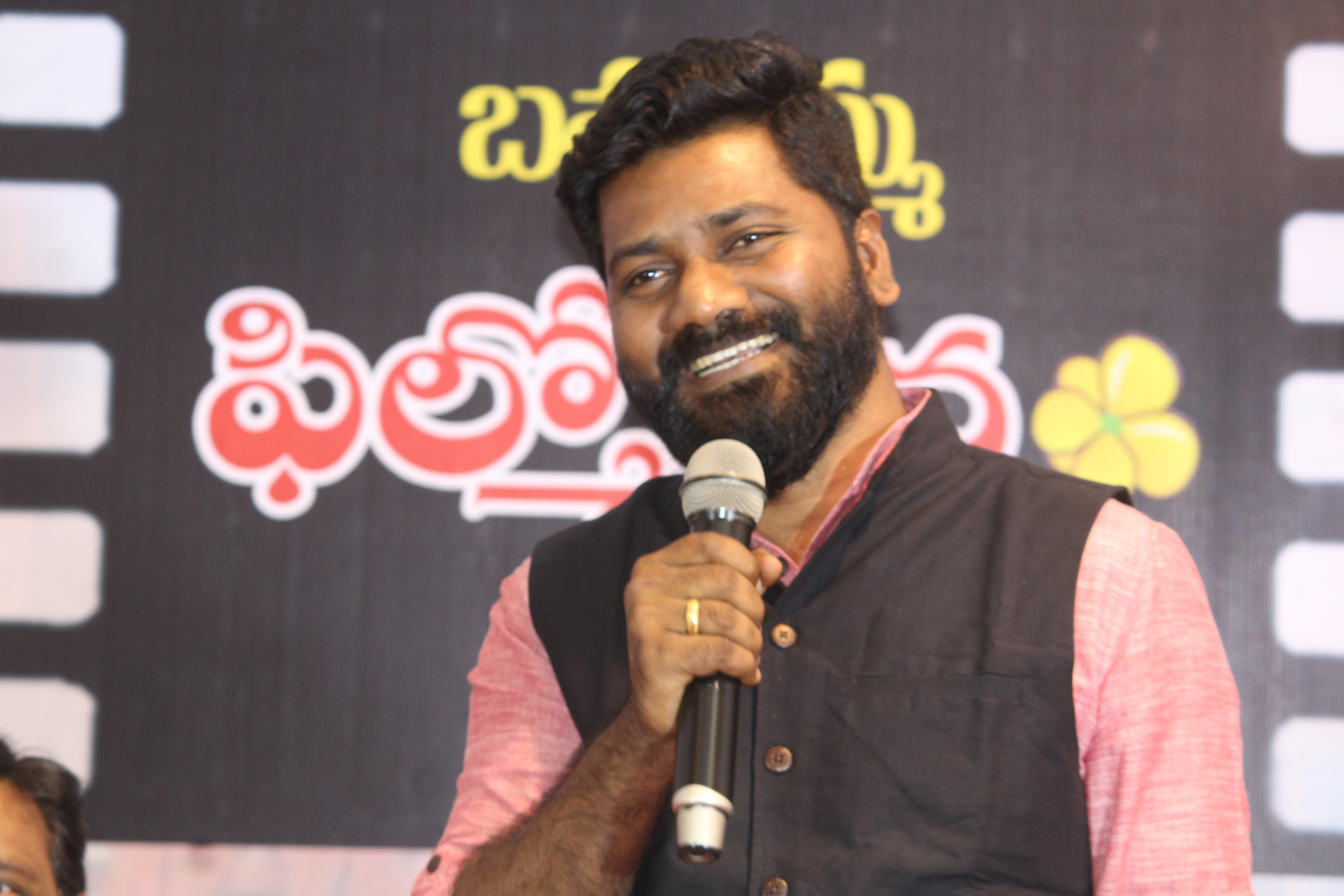
- Born: Venu Udugula; 20 July 1983 (age 42); Upparapalle, Warangal, Telangana, India
- Occupations: Writer; Dialogue writer; Screen writer; Film director; poet
- Years active: 2000–present

Venu Udugula (born 20 July 1983) is an Indian film director, poet, and screenwriter who works in the Telugu cinema. He made his directorial debut with the critically acclaimed film Needi Naadi Oke Katha (2018). His second film, Virata Parvam, featured Rana Daggubati, Sai Pallavi and Nandita Das.

== Career ==
Venu Udugula was born on 20 July 1983 in Upparapalle Village in Chennaraopet mandal in Warangal District of Telangana state and is one of the know poets in Telugu. He graduated from Kakatiya University. During that time of education, his inclination towards art since childhood drove him to join the Hyderabad film club and started watching world cinema. He gained his inspiration watching Andrei Tarkovsky, Krzysztof Kieslowski and Cinema of Iran which turned out to have a great impact on his creative being and altered his filmy impulses to vibe his outlook of independent vision. He Made his narrative visually more simple and evocative. Now he sees his films as an extension of his omjijective relaties.

While pursuing his education he started his career as journalist at an early age of 18 years. He worked as a columnist at the magazine "STUDY LINE". His first works include writing an article on the famous poet Anwar's "Thalavanchani Aaranyam" which was appreciated. He Initially worked as a writer and an assistant director for serials and Telefilms and thereafter at an advertisement firm under Madhu Mahankali. Later he worked as an associate director for the movies Pellaina Kothalo and Gunde Jhallumandi under senior writer and director Madan.

Udugula's debut film, Needi Naadi Oke Katha, was noted for its use of dogme 95 filmmaking, and is the second Indian film to do so.

== Filmography ==
Year	Film	Producer	Director	Writer	Screenwriter	Language	Notes	Ref.
2018	Needi Naadi Oke Katha	No	Yes	Yes	Yes	Telugu	Zee Cine Awards Telugu 2018 - Best appreciation Director	-
2022	Virata Parvam	No	Yes	Yes	Yes	Telugu	-	
2025	Raju Weds Rambai	Yes	No	No	No	Telugu	Debut as Producer	

== Awards ==
=== Zee Cine Awards Telugu ===
Year	Film	Category	Ref.
2018	Needi Naadi Oke Katha	Best appreciation Director	
