= Thudarum (soundtrack) =

2025 soundtrack album by Jakes Bejoy

Soundtrack album by Jakes Bejoy
- Released: 11 April 2025
- Recorded: 2024–2025
- Studio: Mindscore Studio, Kochi; Pop Media House, Kochi; M Lounge, Kochi; Soundtown Studios, Chennai; 20dB Black, Chennai
- Genre: Feature film soundtrack
- Length: 22:33
- Language: Malayalam
- Label: Sony Music India
- Producer: Jakes Bejoy

Jakes Bejoy chronology
Officer on Duty (2025)	Thudarum (2025)	Narivetta (2025)
External audio
- Audio Jukebox on YouTube

Singles from Thudarum
- 1. "Kanmanipoove" Released: 21 February 2025; 2. "Kadha Thudarum (Timeless Bond)" Released: 21 March 2025

Thudarum is the soundtrack album composed by Jakes Bejoy for the 2025 Indian Malayalam-language action thriller film of the same name directed by Tharun Moorthy, starring Mohanlal. The album comprises five tracks written by B. K. Harinarayanan, Anwar Ali and Vinayak Sasikumar, with three of them being released as singles. The soundtrack was digitally released by Sony Music India on 11 April 2025.

== Background ==
In May 2024, it was announced that Jakes Bejoy would compose the musical score for Thudarum, in his first collaboration with Mohanlal, and also reuniting with Moorthy for the second time after Operation Java (2021). Previously, Bejoy was first announced as the composer for Mohanlal's Alone (2023) before being replaced by the band 4 Musics. Music sittings for the film began during June 2024 and recording continued till early-April 2025. Bejoy then collaborated with the Budapest Scoring Orchestra for recording the background score.

In a Facebook post, Bejoy shared a collage of the lead actors alongside elephant, king cobra and wolf describing the metaphorical cues in the sound. The kombu and chenda represented "Benz" Shanmugham (Mohanlal), nagapattu and dissonant violin motifs to represent the antagonist CI/ DYSP George Mathan (Prakash Varma) and wolf's howl reflected Benny (Binu Pappu). The folk song "Pemari" and the vocals represent "the cry of the mother forest herself" that tied with the film's raw and earthy themes.

== Release ==
The first single from the film "Kanmanipoove" performed by M. G. Sreekumar, was released on 21 February 2025. It was followed by the second single "Kadha Thudarum (Timeless Bond)", a duet performed by Hariharan and Gokul Gopakumar, was released on 21 March 2025. The soundtrack was released through Sony Music India on 11 April 2025. Post release, The promo song "Kondattam" was released on 30 April 2025.

The film features a remix version of yesteryear song "Shanthamee Rathriyil" from the film Johnnie Walker. Originally written by Gireesh Puthenchery, composed by S. P. Venkatesh and sung by K. J. Yesudas, the song was re-arranged by Jakes Bejoy and sung by Aravind Dileep Nair. The music video was released on Nisari Chithrageetham's YouTube channel on 5 May 2025.

== Track listing ==
=== Original tracklist ===
No.	Title	Lyrics	Singer(s)	Length
1.	"Kanmanipoove"	B. K. Harinarayanan	M. G. Sreekumar	5:54
2.	"Kadha Thudarum (Timeless Bond)"	B. K. Harinarayanan	Hariharan, Gokul Gopakumar	4:21
3.	"Pemari"	Anwar Ali	Anila Rajeev	2:02
4.	"Kadha Thudarum" (Version 2)	B. K. Harinarayanan	Hariharan	4:21
5.	"Kanmanipoove" (Karaoke)	—	—	5:54
Total length:				22:33

=== Extended version ===
Thudarum (Extended Version)

Soundtrack album by Jakes Bejoy
- Released: 21 May 2025
- Recorded: 2024–2025
- Studio: Mindscore Studio, Kochi; Pop Media House, Kochi; M Lounge, Kochi; Soundtown Studios, Chennai; 20dB Black, Chennai
- Genre: Feature film soundtrack
- Length: 55:04
- Language: Malayalam
- Label: Sony Music India
- Producer: Jakes Bejoy
External audio
- Audio Jukebox on YouTube

An extended version of the film's soundtrack was released through Sony Music India on 21 May 2025, coinciding Mohanlal's birthday. The album features three additional songs, alongside few excerpts from the background score.

No.	Title	Lyrics	Singer(s)	Length
1.	"Kanmanipoove"	B. K. Harinarayanan	M. G. Sreekumar	5:54
2.	"Kadha Thudarum (Timeless Bond)"	B. K. Harinarayanan	Hariharan, Gokul Gopakumar	4:21
3.	"Kondattam"	Vinayak Sasikumar	M. G. Sreekumar, Rajalakshmy	4:12
4.	"Anbe"	Mani Amuthavan	Govind Vasantha	5:24
5.	"Kadha Thudarum" (Version 2)	B. K. Harinarayanan	Hariharan	4:21
6.	"Pemari"	Anwar Ali	Anila Rajeev	2:02
7.	"Kadha Thudarum" (Version 3)	B. K. Harinarayanan	Gokul Gopakumar	4:21
8.	"Kaderum Komba – Jail Fight"	Tharun Moorthy	Jakes Bejoy	2:36
9.	"Station Thooku"	—	—	0:52
10.	"Nenje – Thudarum"	—	—	2:12
11.	"Forest Pain"	—	—	1:49
12.	"Karimegham – Forest Cry"	—	—	1:35
13.	"Nenje – The Last Cry"	—	—	0:52
14.	"Kanmanipoove" (Karaoke)	—	—	5:54
15.	"Kadha Thudarum" (Karaoke)	—	—	4:20
16.	"Kondattam" (Karaoke)	—	—	4:12
Total length:				55:04

== Background score ==
Thudarum

Film score by Jakes Bejoy
- Released: 7 May 2025
- Recorded: 2024–2025
- Studio: Mindscore Studio, Kochi; Pop Media House, Kochi; Cochin Arts & Communications, Kochi; M Lounge, Kochi; Soundtown Studios, Chennai; K7 Studios, Kochi
- Genre: Film score
- Length: 1:15:53
- Language: Malayalam
- Label: Sony Music India
- Producer: Jakes Bejoy
External audio
- Film Score on YouTube

The original background score was released through Sony Music India on 7 May 2025.

No.	Title	Length
1.	"Forest Pain"	1:49
2.	"A Disturbing Find"	0:30
3.	"Happy Space"	1:26
4.	"World of Elephants"	0:20
5.	"Master"	0:26
6.	"Visitors of Mark 1"	0:20
7.	"Happy Space Lunch Time"	0:24
8.	"Alcoholic Weather"	0:34
9.	"There Goes My Car"	1:40
10.	"Parenthood"	0:42
11.	"Benny the Wolf"	0:24
12.	"Root of Mark 1"	0:48
13.	"Maniyan the Culprit"	0:34
14.	"Laali the Fraud"	1:06
15.	"Fox on Hunt"	0:54
16.	"The Manipulator"	1:36
17.	"The Venomous George"	1:16
18.	"Venomous Snake Bite"	1:18
19.	"Soul of Thudarum"	1:48
20.	"The Fear"	0:54
21.	"The Weight, I Didn't Choose"	0:36
22.	"The Bad Smell"	0:56
23.	"Is that Maniyan?"	0:52
24.	"Folded Truth"	1:56
25.	"The Truth He Feared"	1:12
26.	"Desperate Father"	1:45
27.	"My Son"	0:43
28.	"Daive - Wounded Father"	2:23
29.	"Ottayan Entry"	1:04
30.	"Wolf in Search"	0:52
Total length:		1:15:53

== Reception ==
Anandu Suresh of The Indian Express wrote "Jakes Bejoy once again proves that he is a music maestro, with his songs and background score elevating the movie to greater heights throughout". Sia Viju of Mathrubhumi wrote "The music by Jakes Bejoy is a revelation—an emotionally attuned score that doesn’t just accompany scenes but elevates them. Every track is designed to resonate, and the background score is the beating heart of this film." Rohit Panikker of Filmfare wrote "Jakes Bejoy’s music score is both stirring and restrained, heightening the emotional pulse of the film without ever overpowering the narrative." Vignesh Madhu of The New Indian Express wrote "Jakes Bejoy also amps up his game once things turn serious, unleashing a string of thrilling scores to underline Benz's rollercoaster of emotions." Arjun Menon of Rediff.com wrote "Jakes Bejoy perfectly switches with the ever-changing tonal variations of the film and keeps the action suspenseful. The score and songs fit in nicely with the everyday textures of this self-contained story world."
