= Mark (2025 film) =

- Theatrical release poster
- Directed by: Vijay Karthikeyaa
- Written by: Vijay Karthikeyaa
- Produced by: T. G. Thyagarajan (presenter); Sudeepa; Sendhil Thyagarajan; Arjun Thyagarajan
- Starring: Sudeepa; Shine Tom Chacko; Naveen Chandra; Vikranth; Yogi Babu
- Cinematography: Shekar Chandra
- Edited by: S. R. Ganesh Babu
- Music by: B. Ajaneesh Loknath
- Production companies: Sathya Jyothi Films; Kichcha Creations
- Release date: 25 December 2025
- Country: India
- Language: Kannada
- Box office: ₹51.30 crore

Mark is a 2025 Indian Kannada-language action thriller film directed and written by Vijay Kartikeyaa and produced jointly by Sathya Jyothi Films and Kichcha Creations. The film's ensemble cast include Sudeepa, marking his second collaboration with Vijay following their 2024 film Max, along with Naveen Chandra, Shine Tom Chacko, Vikranth, Roshni Prakash, Guru Somasundaram, Yogi Babu, Deepshika, Dragon Manju, Gopalkrishna Deshpande and Nishvika Naidu.

Principal photography commenced in early July 2025 and concluded in approximately 110 days, with key locations including Bengaluru's Kanakapura Road, Pondicherry, Thoothukudi and several sets across Karnataka. Post-production—including visual effects, background score, and dubbing—was completed by mid-November 2025 with the film's official trailer unveiling on 7 December 2025.

The film had a "pan-Indian" theatrical release on 25 December 2025 to capitalize on the Christmas season. It was simultaneously released in Kannada alongside a partially reshot Tamil version and dubbed versions in Telugu, Malayalam, and Hindi.

== Plot ==
Ajay Mark, is a suspended Superintendent of Police in Mangaluru, sidelined after a clash with a corrupt politician. His life takes a dramatic turn when a series of violent incidents unfold across Karnataka. A brutal mass murder in Kolhapur introduces Bhadra, a gangster whose rage stems from his brother's elopement. Meanwhile, Mark rescues a group of policemen from rowdies in Mangaluru, pulling him back into active duty.

The investigation deepens when Mark's mother is stabbed, and Archana, their caretaker's child, is abducted. He discovers a large-scale child kidnapping racket, with nearly twenty children missing. As Mark races against time, a political conspiracy surfaces when the Chief Minister is murdered in a hospital by her son Adikeshav, who kills her to seize power. The nexus between the drug mafia, child trafficking, and political ambition becomes clear.

Mark faces betrayal within his own ranks while battling Bhadra's gang and rescuing the abducted children. In a high-octane climax, he exposes Adikeshav and dismantles the criminal cartel, restoring law and clearing his name. The narrative unfolds over a tight 36-hour window, blending intense action, emotional stakes, and political intrigue.

== Cast ==
- Sudeepa as SP Ajay Markandeya IPS
- Shine Tom Chacko as Aadhikeshava
- Naveen Chandra as Bhadhra
- Vikranth as Rudhra
- Yogi Babu as Solomon
- Guru Somasundaram as Stephen Nedumpally Raaj
- Roshni Prakash as Sanjana
- Deepshika as Maayaa
- Gopalkrishna Deshpande as Ranghayya
- Dev Gill as Devaraj
- Archana Kottige as Sharanya
- Neenasam Ashwath as SI Suri
- Prathap Narayan as Naren
- Abishek Joseph George as Nair
- Dragon Manju as Stephen Raj's henchwoman
- Sathya S K as Sundar
- Mahantesh Hiremath
- G. M. Kumar as Bhadra, Rudhra father
- Aruldoss as Murali
- Subbu Panchu as Ashoka, Bhadra's uncle
- Nishvika Naidu in a cameo appearance

== Production ==
The project was publicly announced in 2025. Initial reports referred to the film under a working title before the official title Mark was revealed. The title reveal was widely covered by regional and national entertainment media, many of which published details about its planned release and production background.

Shekar Chandra as cinematographer and S. R. Ganesh Babu as editor. B. Ajaneesh Loknath serves as the music director. Production design is by Shivakumar J, with extensive stunt choreography and VFX works.

=== Filming ===
According to press sources, principal photography took place through 2025. Reports from Udayavani and The Times of India indicated that filming finished in November 2025, aligning with the production's goal of a late-2025 release.

== Music ==
B. Ajaneesh Loknath is credited as the film's composer. The first song associated with the film received coverage in several outlets, which noted its release schedule and early audience response.

All lyrics are written by Anup Bhandari.

Kannada track listing
No.	Title	Singer(s)	Length
1.	"Masth Malaika"	Nakash Aziz, Sanvi Sudeep	3:13
2.	"Psycho Saithan"	Vijay Prakash, Aniruddha Sastry	3:27
3.	"The Kaali Song"	Aniruddha Sastry	3:36
4.	"Mark Title Glimpse"	Instrumental	1:52

== Marketing ==
Teaser descriptions and title reveal updates were carried by outlets including Times of India, OneIndia, Public TV, and Zoom TV. Coverage generally focused on the film's announcement, cast details, and scheduled release window.

== Release ==
Mark was released on 25 December 2025 On Christmas in Kannada, Tamil, Malayalam, Telugu and Hindi.

== Reception ==
Nirali Kanabar of Times Now gave 3/5 stars and wrote "All in all, Mark is a solid massy action thriller that knows exactly what it wants to be. Director Vijay Karthikeyaa delivers an engaging narrative packed with well-shot action sequences and impactful emotional beats. As for Kiccha Sudeepa, the actor is in a terrific form. He dominates the screen with swag and intensity. The film, backed by impressive music and crisp editing, makes for a satisfying theatrical experience. On the whole, Mark is a worthy Christmas watch for those who love watching action thrillers."

Swaroop Kodur of The Indian Express gave 2.5/5 stars and wrote "Vijay Karthikeyaa's hotch-potch narrative is met by subpar execution, leaving Sudeep and many other talented names with little to work with." Prathibha Joy of OTT Play gave 2/5 stars and wrote "Mark is just another movie in the Max template, albeit one that is not half as fun, entertaining or gripping. Vijay’s style-over-substance approach is a misfire. Despite massively tempered expectations, Mark was disappointing to say the least." Vivek MV of The Hindu wrote "With some stylish scenes and a few catchy dance numbers, ‘Mark’, starring Sudeep and directed by Vijay Kartikeyaa, tries to be a gripping thriller, but it ultimately misses the mark on delivering a memorable experience."
