= Brat (2025 film) =

Indian Kannada-language action thriller film

- Theatrical release poster
- Directed by: Shashank
- Written by: Yadunandan; Ravi Chakravarthy
- Produced by: Manjunath Kandkur
- Starring: Krishna; Manisha Kandkur; Achyuth Kumar
- Cinematography: Abhilash Kalathi
- Edited by: Giri Mahesh
- Music by: Arjun Janya
- Production company: Dolphin Entertainment
- Release date: 31 October 2025
- Running time: 153 minutes
- Country: India
- Language: Kannada
- Budget: ₹ 8 crores
- Box office: ₹ 10.2 crores

Brat is a 2025 Indian Kannada-language action thriller film written by Yadunandan and Ravi Chakravarthy, and directed by Shashank. The film, produced by Manjunath Kandkur under Dolphin Entertainment, is planned to be screened in five Indian languages. The film stars "Darling" Krishna and Manisha Kandkur, making her debut in Kannada, in the lead roles. The music is composed by Arjun Janya while the cinematography is by Abhilash Kalanthi.

The film was first announced during its scripting stage in May 2024 with the news of Krishna and Shashank reuniting after Kousalya Supraja Rama (2023). The filming began in August 2024. After several announcements on release, the film locked the release date on 31 October 2025.

== Plot ==
The story opens with the line: "If we need life to be like the way we want, we have to take risks". This sets the tone for Kristy’s journey—a young man from a modest family who dreams of wealth and comfort. Kristy (Krishna) initially indulges in harmless gambling, but his obsession with quick money soon spirals into the dark world of cricket betting. Kristy’s father, Mahadevaiah (Achyuth Kumar), is an honest constable serving under a corrupt inspector, Ravikumar (Ramesh Indira). Despite the corruption around him, Mahadevaiah remains steadfast in his principles, often clashing with Kristy’s ambitions. His mother, Renuka, and girlfriend Manisha (Manisha Kandkur) hope Kristy’s ventures will solve their financial struggles, adding emotional complexity to his choices.

Frustrated by his family’s modest means, Kristy starts betting on cricket matches with college students. Initially, he earns easy money, which fuels his greed and draws in his friends and loved ones. However, when a major bet goes wrong and the bookie disappears, Kristy finds himself entangled in a dangerous web controlled by Dollar Mani (Dragon Manju), a ruthless betting mafia kingpin.

As Kristy’s world collapses, the narrative explores whether he will choose greed or redemption. His father’s unwavering honesty and emotional confrontations force Kristy to reflect on his choices. The climax delivers a mix of high-octane action, emotional drama, and unexpected twists, including a hilarious 20-minute sequence involving Dollar Mani that had audiences in splits.

== Cast ==
- Krishna as Krishna "Kristy"
- Manisha Kandakur as Manisha
- Achyuth Kumar as Constable Mahadevaiah, Krishna' father
- Ramesh Indira as Inspector Ravikumar
- Dragon Manju as Dollar Mani
- Manasi Sudheer
- Gourav Shetty
- Sri Vatsa

== Soundtrack ==
The soundtrack is scored by Arjun Janya. During the title launch event in July 2025, rapper Rahul Dit-O performed for the single "Brat Theory". It was also reported that singer Sid Sriram has recorded the song "Naane Neenanthe". The next single "Gangi Gangi" sung by Balu Belagundi and Indu Nagaraj was released on 13 September 2025. The audio rights were acquired by Anand Audio.

Track listing
No.	Title	Lyrics	Singer(s)	Length
1.	"Brat Theory"	Rahul Dit-O	Rahul Dit-O	4:23
2.	"Naane Neenanthe"	Shashank	Sid Sriram	4:01
3.	"Gangi Gangi"	Balu Belagundi	Balu Belagundi, Indu Nagaraj	5:03

== Critical reception ==
Brat received mixed-to-positive reviews from critics. Writing, cinematography and performances were praised. Krishna’s transformation from romantic hero to intense performer was praised. Achyuth Kumar’s grounded portrayal of Mahadevaiah was appreciated. Dragon Manju and Ramesh Indira were dubbed as the showstoppers for their quirky characterisation.

While some reviews noted pacing issues, audiences loved the engaging screenplay, dialogues and stylish visuals, and Arjun Janya’s music.
