= Karikkad =

- village
- Location in Kerala, India Karikkad (India)
- Coordinates: 10°41′30″N 76°4′20″E
- Country: India
- State: Kerala
- District: Thrissur

Population (2011)
  - Total: 13,656

Languages
  - Official: Malayalam, English
- Time zone: UTC+5:30 (IST)
- PIN CODE: 680519
- Vehicle registration: KL-48

Karikkad is a village in Thrissur district in the state of Kerala, India.

== Demographics ==
As of 2011 India census, Karikkad had a population of 13656 with 6498 males and 7158 females.
