= Raju Weds Rambai =

2025 Indian Telugu film by Saailu Kampati

- Theatrical release poster
- Directed by: Saailu Kampati
- Written by: Saailu Kampati
- Produced by: Venu Udugula; Rahul Mopidevi
- Starring: Akhil Raj; Tejaswi Rao; Chaitu Jonnalagadda
- Cinematography: Wajid Baig
- Edited by: Naresh Adupa
- Music by: Suresh Bobbili
- Production companies: Dolamukhi Subaltern Films; Monsoons Tales; ETV Win
- Distributed by: Bunny Vas Works; Vamshi Nandipati Entertainments
- Release date: 21 November 2025
- Running time: 135 minutes
- Country: India
- Language: Telugu

Raju Weds Rambai is a 2025 Indian Telugu-language romantic drama film written and directed by debutant Saailu Kampati and produced by Venu Udugula and Rahul Mopidevi under the banners of Dolamukhi Subaltern Films and Monsoons Tales for ETV Win. The film stars Akhil, Tejaswi Rao, and Chaitu Jonnalagadda. The film is inspired by true events.

The film was released on 21 November 2025.

Raju Weds Rambai won the Gaddar Award for Best Feature Film for 2025.

== Plot ==
The film begins with the wedding of one of Raju's (Akhil Raj Uddemari) friends marriage. During the marriage, the bride is shown to be pregnant. Raju supervises all the activities during the wedding procession and is later seen playing drums at night, highlighting his passion for music and his carefree nature. Raju has a childhood crush on Rambai (Tejaswini Rao), who is the daughter of Venkanna (Chaitu Jonnalagadda), a clerk (compounder) at a government hospital. Raju's father (Shivaji Raja) asks him to go to Hyderabad, find a job, and settle down. However, Raju refuses to leave his hometown, stating that he is content with his life and enjoys playing drums. Raju begins pursuing Rambai in his own playful and unconventional way. Though she initially rejects him, his persistence and genuine affection gradually break down her defenses, and they eventually fall in love. Venkanna, however, insists that he will marry his daughter only to a man who has a government job.

Raju and Rambai decide to elope, but Rambai becomes scared and repeatedly postpones the plan, giving trivial reasons. Frustrated, Raju asks her to elope on a particular day, but Rambai does not turn up. Enraged, Raju goes to her house, assaults her, and accuses her of not loving him. The villagers witness this incident and inform Venkanna and Rambai's mother. Both families confront each other at Raju's house, leading to a violent scuffle. Raju also gets into a fight with his father and leaves home. Later that day, Raju is informed that his father has passed away. Burdened by guilt and responsibility, Raju decides to go to Hyderabad to find a job and clear his family's debts.

In Hyderabad, Raju constantly thinks about Rambai and is unable to concentrate on his work. Eventually, he is fired from his job at a petrol pump. When he asks for the wages he has earned, the owner refuses to pay him. In desperation, Raju attempts to burn down the petrol pump, but the owner stops him and begs for forgiveness, finally giving him his due payment. Raju returns to the village and clears his family loans. He meets Rambai again, and they rekindle their love. Rambai gives Raju money to buy an auto so that he can earn a stable living. Rambai then asks her father whether she can marry the man she loves, but Venkanna remains firm, stating that she must marry someone with a government job. Raju and Rambai come up with a desperate plan: if Rambai becomes pregnant, Venkanna will be forced to accept their marriage. Rambai becomes pregnant, and when Venkanna discovers this, he takes her to the government hospital and forces the doctor to abort the baby. He then tries to arrange her marriage with another man who has a government job. Raju learns about this alliance and meets the prospective groom. He reveals that Rambai loves him and that Venkanna had their unborn child aborted. Shocked by the truth, the groom backs out. Left with no choice, Venkanna is forced to agree to Rambai's marriage with Raju. Consumed by rage and hatred, Venkanna later goes to the hospital, obtains an HIV-infected syringe, and injects Rambai with it. Rambai is subsequently diagnosed with HIV and asks Raju to forget her and marry someone else. Raju refuses, assuring her that they will remain together for as long as she lives. Seven years after the incident, both Raju and Rambai pass away, bringing the tragic love story to an end.

== Cast ==
- Akhil Raj Uddemari as Raju
- Tejaswi Rao as Rambai
- Chaitu Jonnalagadda as Venkanna
- Shivaji Raja as Ramesh
- Anita Chowdhary
- Kavitha Srirangam

== Movie Presenter ==
[5][6][7][8]

== Music ==
The songs and background score for the film were composed by Suresh Bobbili. There are total of 5 soundtracks in the album.

Raju Weds Rambai

Soundtrack album by Suresh Bobbili
- Released: 2025
- Genre: Feature film soundtrack
- Label: Aditya Music

Track listing
No.	Title	Lyrics	Singer(s)	Length
1.	"Rambai Neemeedha Naku"	Mittapally Surendar	Anurag Kulkarni, Jayasri Pallem	3:50
2.	"Ala Ala"	Mittapally Surendar	Chinmayi Sripada	3:17
3.	"Adagave Prema"	Mittapally Surendar	Mittapally Surendar	2:57
4.	"Koodukuntunnadi"	Mittapally Surendar	Shankar Babu	3:07
5.	"Kalisundatame"	Mittapally Surendar	Suresh Bobbili	3:21

=== Theatrical ===
Raju Weds Rambai was released in theatres on 21 November 2025.

=== Home media ===
The film began streaming on ETV Win from 18 December 2025.

== Reception ==
=== Critical response ===
Raju Weds Rambai received average reviews from critics and audiences. Hollywood Reporter India said the movie has outdated romance and shocking value is not greater than storytelling. The Hindu said the movie does not live up to the shock value

=== Box office ===
The film collected ₹7.15 crore (US$740,000) over the first weekend.
