= Gatha Vaibhava =

2025 Indian Kannada-language fantasy drama film

- Directed by: Suni
- Written by: Suni
- Screenplay by: Suni
- Story by: Suni
- Produced by: Deepak Thimmappa; Suni
- Starring: SS Dushyanth; Ashika Ranganath
- Cinematography: William David
- Edited by: Ashik Kusugolli
- Music by: Judah Sandhy
- Production companies: Servegara Silver Screens; Suni Cinemas
- Distributed by: Jagadeesh Films
- Release date: 14 November 2025
- Running time: 142 minutes
- Country: India
- Language: Kannada
- Budget: est. ₹10–20 crore

Gatha Vaibhava (transl. Past Glory) is a 2025 Indian Kannada fantasy-period romantic drama film written, directed and co-produced by Suni. It stars debutant SS Dushyanth and Ashika Ranganath, both in four roles. Produced by Deepak Thimmappa under Servegara Silver Screens and Suni's Suni Cinemas, the film was released on 14 November 2025 with Telugu dubbed version on 1 January 2026. Judah Sandhy composed the music while William David served as the cinematographer.

The film was officially announced and its Principal photography began in 2021. The team shot for over 100 days, including a schedule in Portugal where they filmed on an exact replica of Christopher Columbus' flagship, the Santa Maria de Colombo.

The film spans takes place in distinct eras — contemporary, historical, and mythological — exploring the theme of reincarnation. The narrative follows the lead characters who meet in the present day and uncover memories of their past lives. One incarnation is set during the mythological episode of Samudra Manthana from the Vishnu Purana, another during the Portuguese explorations of India led by Vasco da Gama, and the third in the early 20th century.

== Plot summary ==
The film unfolds across three distinct timelines, exploring the reincarnated lives of its protagonists, Purathan and Adhunika. The first story is set in Devaloka, where Adhunika appears as a celestial being Devakanye Devi (Devathe) and Purathan as Rakshasangaalla (Rakshasa), a Demon. Their love is thwarted by destiny.

The second narrative shifts to a fictionalised Portugal during the Age of Exploration, where Purathan as sailor Philip Walter, in an attempt to impress Adhunika as Elizabeth, spins a flamboyant tale involving Vasco da Gama, spice routes, and romance.

The third and most emotionally grounded story takes place in coastal Karnataka over a century ago, portraying Purathan as chennayya Raja , a skilled Kambala jockey and Adhunika as Mangala, a naive village girl. This final chapter becomes the key to unlocking Purathan's memories and convictions, tying together the threads of their intertwined past lives.

== Cast ==
- SS Dushyanth in four roles as
  - Purathan
  - Rakshasangaalla (Rakshasa), a Demon
  - Philip Walter, a sailor
  - Chennayya Raja (Srinivas), a former skilled Kambala Jockey
- Ashika Ranganath in four roles as
  - Adhunika
  - Devakanye Devi (Devathe)
  - Elizabeth
  - Mangala (Tulasi), an innocent Village Girl
- Kishen Bilagali as Anamadeva
- Chiru S as Vasco Da Gama
- Sudha Belawadi as Sudha Kanati
- Krishna Hebbale as Krishna Kanati
- Krishna Jorapur
- Karthik Rao as Badayi

== Production ==
=== Development ===
Gatha Vaibhava was announced by Suni in 2021 as an ambitious period drama exploring reincarnation across three timelines — mythological, historical, and early 20th century. The concept drew inspiration from the Vishnu Purana episode of Samudra Manthana, the Portuguese explorations led by Vasco da Gama, and traditional coastal Karnataka culture.

The project was conceived as a large-scale period drama spanning three distinct eras, which Suni described as "making four films in one." Filming took place over more than 100 days across multiple schedules, with significant delays extending the production timeline to nearly five years due to technical challenges and actor availability.

Key sequences were shot in Portugal, including scenes aboard the Santa Maria de Colombo, a replica of Christopher Columbus’ flagship, for the Vasco da Gama-era storyline. Additional filming occurred in coastal Karnataka for the early 20th-century Kambala scenes, while mythological sequences set in Devaloka and depicting Samudra Manthana were created using extensive VFX and studio work.

The film employed elaborate costume design to reflect 14th-century Portuguese fashion and traditional Indian attire, alongside heavy use of visual effects to achieve the grandeur of its mythological setting. The estimated budget was around ₹10 - 20 crore, and the runtime is approximately 142 minutes.

=== Casting & Filming ===
Pre-production began in 2022 with extensive research and scripting to ensure authenticity in historical and mythological segments. Casting finalized with Ashika Ranganath as the female lead, portraying four distinct roles, and SS Dushyanth as the male protagonist. Principal photography commenced in 2023, spanning over 100 days. Key schedules included studio shoots for Devaloka sequences, on-location filming in coastal Karnataka for Kambala scenes, and a major schedule in Portugal aboard the Santa Maria de Colombo replica ship for Vasco da Gama-era sequences.

== Soundtrack ==
Gatha Vaibhava

Soundtrack album by Judah Sandhy
- Released: 2025
- Recorded: 2024
- Studio: Suni Cinemas
- Genre: Feature film soundtrack
- Length: 10:28
- Language: Kannada
- Producer: Judah Sandhy

The music and background score of the film is composed by Judah Sandhy marking his first collaboration with Suni. The soundtrack was released in October 2025, ahead of the film's theatrical release on 14 November 2025. The first single, "Varnamaale", debuted on 8 October 2025 in both Kannada and Telugu versions at a launch event in Hyderabad.

Kannada Track listing
No.	Title	Lyrics	Singer(s)	Length
1.	"Varnamaale"	Suni	Abhinandan Mahishale, Sunidhi Ganesh	4:05
2.	"Ship Song"	Suni	Kailash Kher, Chethan Naik, Chinmayi L	3:25
3.	"Oseyo Oseyo"	Suni	Chethan Naik, Airaa Udupi	2:58
Total length:				10:28

Telugu Track listing
No.	Title	Lyrics	Singer(s)	Length
1.	"Varnamaala"	Krishna Kanth	Anurag Kulkarni, Chinmayi Sripada	4:05
2.	"Ship Song"	Suni	Kailash Kher, Chethan Naik, Chinmayi L	3:25
3.	"Taarakaadhrudaa"	Rambabu Gosala	Chethan Naik, Airaa Udupi	2:28
Total length:				10:28

== Post-production & Release ==
Post-production extended through 2024 due to the complexity of VFX work required for the mythological sequences. Suni described the process as "making four films in one," citing the challenge of blending fantasy, history, and realism. The film was completed in mid-2025, with promotional campaigns highlighting its grand scale and reincarnation theme. Gatha Vaibhava was released theatrically on 14 November 2025 in Kannada and will be released on 1 January 2026 in Telugu, distributed by Jagadeesh Films in Karnataka and PrimeShow Entertainment in Telugu states.

== Reception ==
The Times of India rated the film 3.5/5, calling it "a visually rich love story that spans lifetimes," and commended its polished production design, VFX, and Judah Sandhy's music. The review highlighted Ashika Ranganath's charm and debutant SS Dushyanth's impressive screen presence, while noting that the narrative transitions between timelines were fluid and cinematic. The New Indian Express also gave 3.5/5, describing the film as "a timeless mosaic of love, fate, and reincarnation." It praised Suni's gentle approach to the reincarnation theme and emotional honesty, though it observed that the coastal Karnataka segment felt stretched. Samyukta Karnataka rated it 3.5/5, appreciating the emotional depth of the coastal storyline and strong performances by Dushyanth and Ashika, while lauding the technical aspects like cinematography and music.

TV9 Kannada gave 3/5, noting the film's ambitious structure of four interconnected stories and praising the second half and climax for their emotional impact. Filmibeat Kannada rated it 3/5, acknowledging the novelty of the reincarnation concept and strong performances, but pointed out that some episodes lacked narrative tightness.

The Hindu offered a more critical view, calling the film "an uneven reincarnation drama" and criticizing poor CGI in mythological sequences and an unfunny parody in the Portugal segment, though it appreciated Ashika's versatility and Dushyanth's effort. Deccan Herald rated it 2/5, arguing that Suni "went overboard" and that the film faltered in execution, despite Ashika's convincing performance.
