= Telusu Kada =

2025 Indian film by Neeraja Kona

- Theatrical release poster
- Directed by: Neeraja Kona
- Screenplay by: Neeraja Kona
- Story by: Neeraja Kona
- Produced by: T. G. Vishwa Prasad; Krithi Prasad
- Starring: Siddhu Jonnalagadda; Raashii Khanna; Srinidhi Shetty
- Cinematography: Gnana Shekar V. S.
- Edited by: Naveen Nooli
- Music by: Thaman S
- Production company: People Media Factory
- Release date: 17 October 2025
- Running time: 135 minutes
- Country: India
- Language: Telugu

Telusu Kada (transl. You know, right?) is a 2025 Indian Telugu-language romantic drama film written and directed by debutant Neeraja Kona and produced by T. G. Vishwa Prasad and Vivek Kuchibhotla, under People Media Factory. The film features Siddhu Jonnalagadda, Raashii Khanna and Srinidhi Shetty. The music was composed by Thaman S. It was released theatrically on 17 October 2025, and received mixed reviews.

== Plot ==
Varun is a talented chef with a painful romantic past. He meets Anjali for a matrimonial alliance and they both hit it off quickly. They start to date and eventually get married. Leading a blissful life, they start to plan for a baby. However, it is revealed that Anjali is sterile but cannot carry a baby to term, devastating her. She meets an IVF specialist Dr. Raaga Kumar, who tells her about surrogacy. Furthermore, Raaga comes forward to be a surrogate for Anjali and Varun's baby herself. After Raaga's pregnancy is confirmed, Varun reveals to Anjali that Raaga is his ex-girlfriend. Varun insists that Raaga move in with them for the duration of her pregnancy and their lives start to get affected in unexpected ways.

== Cast ==
- Siddhu Jonnalagadda as Varun
- Raashii Khanna as Anjali, Varun's wife
- Srinidhi Shetty as Raaga Kumar, Varun's ex-girlfriend
- Harsha Chemudu as Abhi, Varun's best friend
- Rohini as Raaga’s mother
- Sanjay Swaroop as Raaga’s father
- Rajashree as Anjali’s mother
- Sivannarayana Naripeddi as Anjali’s father
- Annapurna as Anjali’s grandmother

== Production ==
The film was launched with a muhuratam ceremony on 18 October 2023 in Hyderabad, which was attended by the film's cast, crew and other figures in Telugu cinema, including Nani, Aadhi Pinisetty and Nithiin. Nithiin was initially supposed to star in the film but it was determined that Siddhu would be better suited for the protagonist's role. Although this film was to be Srinidhi Shetty's debut in Telugu cinema, due to the film's lengthy production, her first Telugu release became HIT: The Third Case.

Shooting commenced on 6 August 2024 in Hyderabad. A minor portion was shot in Ranipet. Deccan Chronicle revealed that Siddhu had changed his appearance, trimming his hair for his role in the film.

== Music ==
Telusu Kadha

Soundtrack album by Thaman S.
- Released: 3 September 2025
- Recorded: 2025
- Genre: Soundtrack
- Length: 12:37
- Label: Tips

Thaman S. chronology
They Call Him OG (2025)	Telusu Kadha (2025)	Akhanda 2: Thaandavam (2025)

The music was composed by Thaman S. in his first collaboration with Neeraja Kona and Siddhu Jonnalagadda. The audio rights were acquired by Tips Music Telugu.

The first single, "Mallika Gandha", sung by Sid Sriram, was released on 16 July 2025. The second single, "Sogasu Chudatharama", sung by Karthik and Adviteeya Vojjala, was released on 20 September 2025. The third single, "Babai", sung by Ram Miriyala, was released post the film's release on 26 September 2025.

No.	Title	Lyrics	Singer(s)	Length
1.	"Mallika Gandha"	Krishna Kanth	Sid Sriram	4:21
2.	"Sogasu Chudatharama"	Krishna Kanth	Karthik, Adviteeya Vojjala	4:16
3.	"Babai"	Kasarla Shyam	Ram Miriyala	4:00
Total length:				12:37

== Release ==
The film was released theatrically on 17 October 2025, coinciding with the week of Deepawali.

== Reception ==
Paul Nicodemus of The Times of India rated the film 3/5 stars and wrote, "The second half, though emotionally charged, falters in pace. The writing leans on convenience, and the narrative loses its rhythm, softening the impact of its central conflict." T. Maruthi Acharya of India Today gave it 3/5 stars and wrote, "Telusu Kada is a confident debut from Neerraja Kona, exploring modern love with bold themes and strong performances. While the film engages, its emotional depth and character arcs could have been sharper."

BH Harsh of Cinema Express gave it 3/5 stars and wrote, "It is complex and messy in all the interesting and enjoyable ways, and yet it’s not messy enough. Riding high on emotions, this film needed a balanced perspective of all its key players. [...] But after all the narrative play, Telusu Kada is eventually eager to sell us easy solutions." Sangeetha Devi Dundoo of The Hindu wrote, "For a story built around three characters, the writing feels thin. [...] Telusu Kada raises questions about love, ego, and communication, but stops short of answering them with the honesty it promises."

Avad Mohammad of OTTPlay gave it 2.5/5 stars and wrote, "Telusu Kada is a new-age romantic drama that has a very interesting plot and is narrated well for the most part. But it is the latter part that struggles to put its point across and makes this a film with limited appeal." Sashidhar Adivi of Filmfare gave it 2.5/5 stars and wrote, "The narrative lacks clarity to hold the interest of the audiences, especially the second half as it features many illogical and contradictory dialogues and scenes."

A critic from Deccan Chronicle gave it 2/5 stars and wrote, "Director Neeraja Kona’s biggest misstep is rushing through the romance and focusing excessively on pregnancy and childbirth sequences. [...] Telusu Kada had potential for an emotional, layered story about love, loss, and motherhood — but ends up a bland, slow-paced affair that tests your patience more than your emotions." Sruthi Ganapathy Raman of The Hollywood Reporter India wrote, "The film, on paper, revolves around a man who navigates his love for two women. But Telusu Kada, in reality, is a cautionary tale about a man who is full of himself."
