= B. K. Harinarayanan =

Indian lyricist and film director

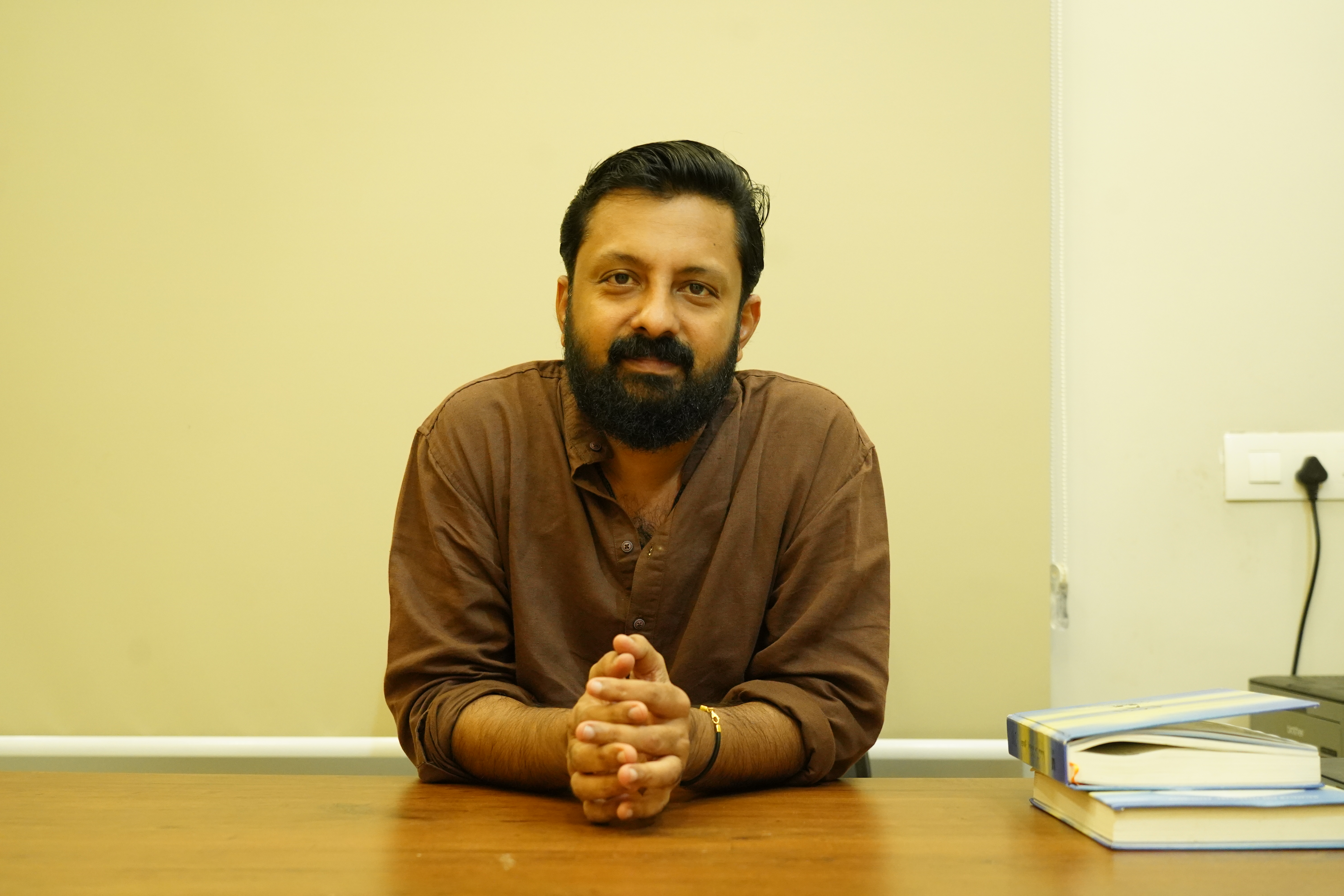
- Born: Karikkad, Kunnamkulam, India
- Occupations: Lyricist; poet; director; actor
- Years active: 2010

B. K. Harinarayanan is a lyricist, poet, director and actor in the Malayalam film industry. He was born in Kunnamkulam in the Thrissur district of Kerala in India.

== Career ==
Harinarayanan's first song was for the film The Thriller, directed by B. Unnikrishnan and released in 2010. Hari became popular as a lyricist after the song "Olanjalikuruvi" from the film 1983 was well received by the audience. He directed two films: Neelambari (2010) and Ila (2021) and acted in the music video of Charulatha (2018).

== Discography ==
=== Film songs ===
Song	Film	Year	Composer	Singer(s)
Priyankari	The Thriller	2010	Dharan	Haricharan Seshadri, Mamta Mohandas
Ormathan Nilaave	The Thriller	2010	Dharan	Alphonse Joseph, Shweta Mohan
Mizhiyil	The Thriller	2010	Dharan	Ranjith Govind, Suvi, Benny Dayal
Thriller Thriller	The Thriller	2010	Dharan	Prithviraj Sukumaran, Sunitha Parthasarathy
Priyankari [Remix]	The Thriller	2010	Dharan	Benny Dayal, Mamta Mohandas
Doore Engo Nee [Pathiye Pathiye Mukil]	Grand Master	2012	Deepak Dev	Sanjeev Thomas
Ambalakkula Kadavil	MLA Mani: Patham Classum Gusthiyum	2012	Kalabhavan Mani	Kalabhavan Mani
Mazhayaayi Nee	I Love Me	2012	Deepak Dev	Benny Dayal
Aayiyo Vishaadameghamaayi	Annum Innum Ennum	2013	Varun Unni	Rahul Nambiar, Ramya Vinayakumar
Come On	Annum Innum Ennum	2013	Varun Unni	Uncategorized
Khuda Woh Khuda	Mr Fraud	2014	Gopi Sundar	Shankar Mahadevan, Stephen Devassy, Balabhaskar
Olanjaali Kuruvi (Record Version – Audio)	1983	2014	Gopi Sundar	P. Jayachandran, Vani Jairam
Olakkam Chodumaay	1983	2014	Gopi Sundar	Nivas Raghunathan, Aleetta Dennis
Kaattu Mooliyo	Om Shaanthi Oshaana	2014	Shaan Rahman	Vineeth Sreenivasan
Eeran Kaattin	Salala Mobiles	2014	Gopi Sundar	Shreya Ghoshal
Olanjaali Kuruvi	1983	2014	Gopi Sundar	P. Jayachandran, Vani Jairam
Aaro Aaro	Ring Master	2014	Gopi Sundar	Najim Arshad
Diana	Ring Master	2014	Gopi Sundar	Shankar Mahadevan
Pakalinu Veyil	1 By Two	2014	Gopi Sundar	Murali Gopi, Sayanora Philip
Naku Penta Naku Taka	Naku Penta Naku Taka	2014	Gopi Sundar, Vayalar Madhavankutty	Gopi Sundar, Abhaya Hiranmayi
Vaa Vayassu Chollidaan	How Old Are You ?	2014	Gopi Sundar	Manjari
Entha Engana	Koothara	2014	Gopi Sundar	Jayen Varma
Kannethaa Doore	Koothara	2014	Gopi Sundar	Gopi Sundar, Rita Thyagarajan
Njaan Kaanum Neram	Avatharam	2014	Deepak Dev	Nivas Raghunathan
Daffodil Poove	Manglish	2014	Gopi Sundar	Haricharan Seshadri, Jyotsna Radhakrishnan
Pattum Chutti	Raajaadhiraaja	2014	Karthik Raja	Sudeep Kumar, Karthik, Najim Arshad, Sachin Warrier, Divya S Menon, Sangeetha Srikanth
Dhan Dhan than	Raajaadhiraaja	2014	Karthik Raja	Tippu, Surmugh, Yazin Nizar, Sudeep Kumar
Jeevitham Mayappambaram	Ithihaasa	2014	Deepak Dev	Rony Philip, Lonely Doggy, Deepak Dev
Ninnil Njaan Ennil Nee	Ithihaasa	2014	Deepak Dev	Najim Arshad, Gayathri Suresh
Ithu Polikkum	Ithihaasa	2014	Deepak Dev	Balu Thankachan
Ambada Njaane	Ithihaasa	2014	Deepak Dev	Deepak Dev, Lonely Doggy, Sannidanandan
Afro Horror	Naku Penta Naku Taka	2014	Gopi Sundar	Uncategorized
Hari Om	Naku Penta Naku Taka	2014	Gopi Sundar	Gopi Sundar, Hiranmayi
Mutholam Azhakilu	Namasthe Baali Island	2015	Gopi Sundar	Gopi Sundar, Chandy, Anna Katharina Valayil, Divya S Menon, Swarna
Panchamippuzhayorathu	Moonnaam Naal	2015	Nikhil Prabha	Nizar Wayanadu, Minmini
Manpaatha Neettunna Mohangale	Mili	2015	Shaan Rahman	Shaan Rahman
Mili Mili (M)	Mili	2015	Gopi Sundar	Gopi Sundar
Mili Mili (F)	Mili	2015	Gopi Sundar	Pavithra Menon
Manju Peyyumee	Mili	2015	Gopi Sundar	Najim Arshad, Mridula Warrier
Kanmaniye	Mili	2015	Gopi Sundar	Minmini
Mizhiyum Mozhiyum (Theme Song)	Mili	2015	Gopi Sundar	Anjana Anilkumar, Anurag R Nayan, Athira Vinod, Nevin C Delson
Engengo	Mili	2015	Gopi Sundar	Gopi Sundar
Kanmaniye (M)	Mili	2015	Gopi Sundar	Gopi Sundar
Mazhamukile	Saaradhi	2015	Gopi Sundar	Najim Arshad, Mridula Warrier
Kuthu Kuthu	Saaradhi	2015	Gopi Sundar	Anuradha Sriram
Choolamittu	Ivan Maryaadaraaman	2015	Gopi Sundar	Vijay Yesudas, Divya S Menon
Ezhazhakulla	Ivan Maryaadaraaman	2015	Gopi Sundar	Afsal, KS Maneesha
Ummarathe	Ivan Maryaadaraaman	2015	Gopi Sundar	V Devanand, Divya S Menon
Manushya Hridhayam	Ivan Maryaadaraaman	2015	Gopi Sundar	Gopi Sundar, Ajay Sen
I Love You Mummy	Bhaskar The Rascal	2015	Deepak Dev	Shweta Mohan, Devika Deepak Dev
Manassilaayiram Kasav Neyyumee	Bhaskar The Rascal	2015	Deepak Dev	Afsal
Pularoli	Bhaskar the Rascal	2015	Deepak Dev	Vijay Yesudas
Munne Munne	Saaradhi	2015	Gopi Sundar	Gopi Sundar
Nilaakkudame	Chirakodinja Kinaavukal	2015	Deepak Dev	P Jayachandran, Minmini
Omale Aaromale	Chirakodinja Kinaavukal	2015	Deepak Dev	Sidharth Mahadevan, Manjari
Hey Kannil	Chirakodinja Kinaavukal	2015	Deepak Dev	Sidharth Mahadevan, Gayathri Suresh
Ambaazham Thanalitta	Oru Second Class Yathra	2015	Gopi Sundar	Vineeth Sreenivasan, Mridula Warrier
Raathri Mulla Than	Laila O Laila	2015	Gopi Sundar	Najim Arshad, Radhika Narayanan
Maruhaba Maruhaba	Laila O Laila	2015	Gopi Sundar	KS Harishankar
No Foolaakking	Vishwaasam – Athalle Ellaam	2015	Gopi Sundar	Gopi Sundar, Abhaya Hiranmayi
Thenni Thudichu	Namasthe Baali Island	2015	Gopi Sundar	Gopi Sundar, Pradeep Babu, Madona
Pichakappoo Cheppilolum	Namasthe Baali Island	2015	Gopi Sundar	Najim Arshad
Vishwasam	Vishwaasam – Athalle Ellaam	2015	Gopi Sundar	Gopi Sundar
Nilavu Thingal	Vishwaasam – Athalle Ellaam	2015	Gopi Sundar	Najim Arshad
Vasoottan	Jamnapyari	2015	Gopi Sundar	Franco Simon Neelankavil
Jamunapyari	Jamnapyari	2015	Gopi Sundar	Sachin Warrier, Maqbool
Murugappa	Jamnapyari	2015	Gopi Sundar	Vijay Yesudas, Jassie Gift, Ramesh Babu, Divya S Menon
Jai Jai Ganesha	High Alert	2015	Ravivarma	Shankar Mahadevan
Barbie Dolly	High Alert	2015	Ravivarma	Uncategorized
Pee Pee Dum Dum	High Alert	2015	Ravivarma	Uncategorized
Jai Jai Ganesha Theme Song	High Alert	2015	Ravivarma	Shankar Mahadevan
Super Super Sangathiyo	High Alert	2015	Ravivarma	Uncategorized
Himashalabhame	Moonnaam Naal	2015	Nikhil Prabha	Edappal Viswan

== Awards ==
Year	Film	Name of the song	Award	Notes
2019	Joseph	Kannethaa Dooram	Kerala State Film Award for Best Lyricist	
2019	Theevandi	Jeevamshamayi	Kerala State Film Award for Best Lyricist	
2022	Kadakalam	Kanneer Kadanju	Kerala State Film Award for Best Lyricist	
