= India Elements =

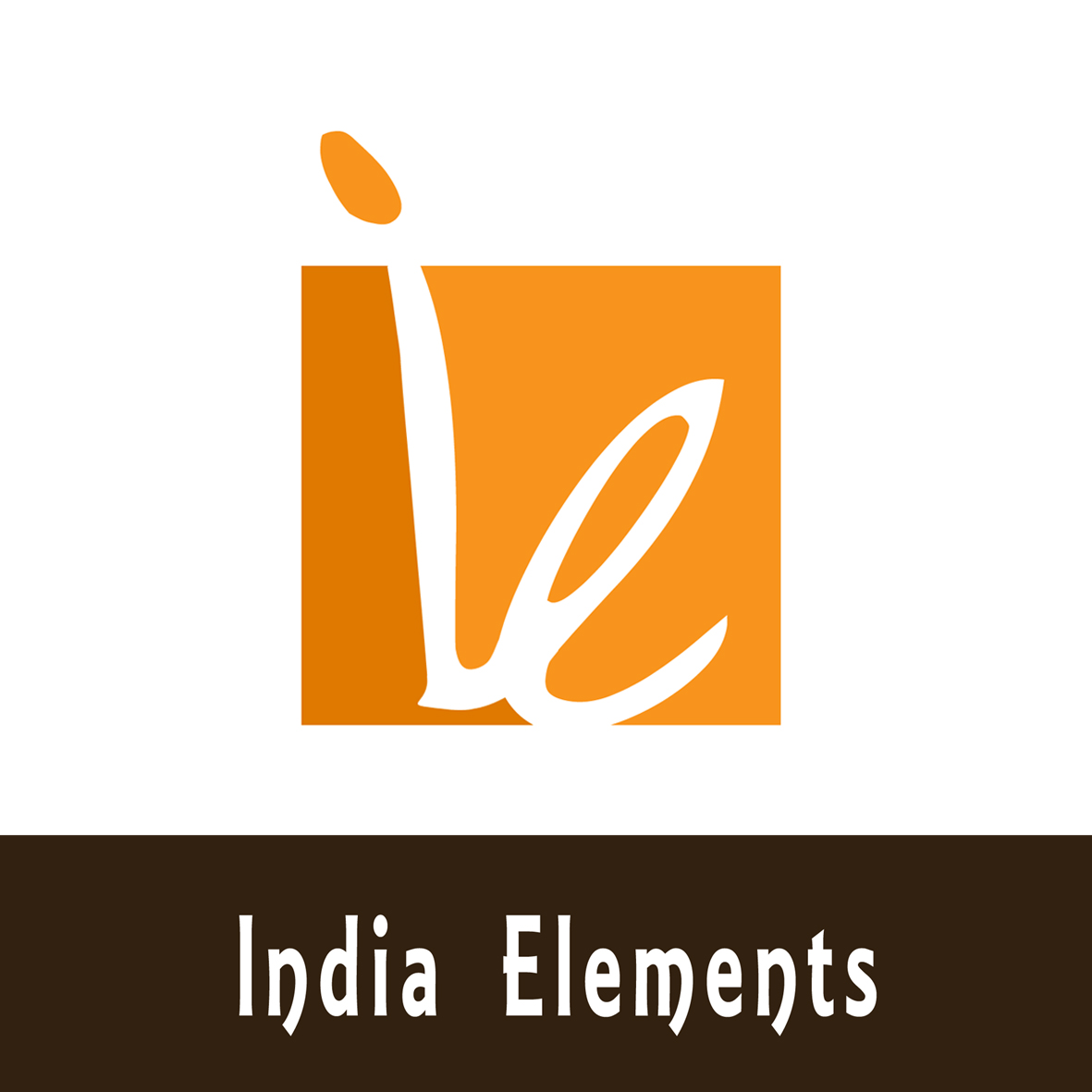
- Formation: 2009
- Type: Artist Management / Event Management
- Headquarters: Kochi, India
- Founder: Manoj K Varghese
- Website: www.indiaelements.com

India Elements is an event and artist management company founded in 2009 with headquarters in Cochin, India. The company specializes in live music and cultural events around the world.

== History ==
India Elements was founded in 2004 by Manoj K Varghese, who managed the company as a cultural facilitator. In 2009, it expanded into an organized event and artist management firm.

== Charity ==
The firm and its founder Manoj K Varghese, who had been the secretary to celebrated artist M.F Husain, is actively involved in charity events. He was the chairman of the Kerala Auxiliary Force, which is a non-profit organization that takes care of the needy. The firm regularly holds charity events that include blood donation camps, charity events for the Dalits, helping Non Resident Indians, healthcare events, and charity music events.

== Notable events ==
| Year | Venue | Artists Involved | Organised By |
|---|---|---|---|
Clubby Online MiniMovie Festival | Inauguration
| 2019 | The Renai, Kochi | Priyadarshan, Suresh Eriyat, Justin Jose, C. K. Muraleedharan, Vasanthabalan, P. F. Mathews, Ramesh Narayan, Suresh Eriyat, Manoj George, Dr. Sandeep Marwah, Ashok Tyagi etc. | Cinema Clubby Business Solutions Pvt. Ltd. |
Bang-de-Beat | Let's Party
| 2018 | Grand Hyatt Bolgatty, Kochi | Abhay Jodhapurkar, Pooja Vaidyanath, Vineeth Mohan, Remya Vinayakumar, Prakash Ulliyeri, Anna Rotka, Sandeep Mohan, Pauly, Nirmal, Antony, Sunilkumar | TRANSMEDCON - 7th National Conference of Immunohematology & Transfusion Medicine. |
Keraliyam
| 2018 | Jaya Palace, Bangalore | 51 Dancers from Sree Sankaracharya University of Sanskrit | Department of Information and Public Relation, Govt. of Kerala |
Kerala State Media Awards
| 2017 | Tagore Theatre, Thiruvananthapuram | INDIVA - The All Female Fusion Band led by Merlin D’Souza, Vivienne Pocha, Shruti Bhave, Chandana Bala Kalyan, Sapna Mane and Aditi Bhagwat | Department of Information and Public Relations, Govt. of Kerala |
Cultural Fest 2017 | Old is Gold
| 2017 | YMCA Vepery, Chennai | Vidyadharan Master, Lathika, Rakesh Brahmanand, Vijitha, Salish and Edappal Viswan | Department of Information and Public Relations, Govt. of Kerala |
Vajrakeralam
| 2017 | Siri Fort Auditorium, New Delhi | Manju Warrier & 52 Melam artists led by Mattannoor Sivaraman, Balussery Krishnadas and Kalasree Cheruthazham Kunhiraman Marar | Department of Information and Public Relations, Govt. of Kerala |
D'Jo & THE BAND
| 2016 | Hotel Le Meridien, Kochi | Dennis Jose (Josy), Abhay Jodhpurkar, Nikhita Gandhi, Syam, Remya Vinayakumar, Anoop R. Nair, Nirmal Antony, Sunil Kumar, Bassman Paul, Preeth PS | Kerala Cricket Association |
Devadundubhi
| 2016 | Tagore Theatre, Trivandrum | Peruvanam Kuttan Marar, Manoj George, Sithara Krishnakumar, Sachin Warrier, Prakash Ulliyeri, Njaralath Hari Govindan, Jocy, Daya Shanker, Sandeep Mohan, Sunil Kumar, M.S. Lavanya, George Abban, Emmanuel Awuku. | Department of Information and Public Relations, Govt. of Kerala |
MILE SUR MERA THUMHARA - A Musical Symphony from ManojGeorge4Strings
| 2015 | Tagore Theatre, Trivandrum | Manoj George, Sithara Krishnakumar, Mithun Jayaraj, Poly Varghese, Ravi Chary, Maarten Visser, Frijo Francis, Ben Sam Jones, Daya Shanker, Sandeep Mohan, Sunil Kumar, 20 Member Chamber Orchestra. | Department of Information and Public Relations, Govt. of Kerala |
ABRAXAS'15 - Campus Show
| 2015 | Sree Narayana Institute of Technology, Adoor, Pathanamthitta | Naresh Iyer, Abhay Jodhpurkar, Nikhita Gandhi, Bennette & the band, Manoj George, Baiju Ezhupunna etc. | SNIT, Adoor |
Eastraga
| 2014 | Kochi | Sithara Krishnakumar and her Band. | Choice Group |
Noisy Mama
| 2013 | JT PAC, Kochi | Carola Grey, Palaghat Sreeram, John Antony etc. | Choice Group |
AJ with Tharang Reloaded
| 2013 | JT PAC, Kochi | Abhay Jodhpurkar, Prakash Ulliyeri, Shomi Davis, Manoj George etc. | Choice Group |
Jail Arts Festival
| 2013 | Poojappura Central Jail, Trivandrum | Rakesh Brahmanadh, Saritha Nair, Pramila, etc. | Department of Prisons, Govt. of Kerala |
Dala - Annual Celebrations
| 2012 | Al Nazar Leisure Land, Dubai | Pndt. Ramesh Narayanan, Ravi Chary, Gayatri Asokan, Bennette, Prakash Ulliyeri etc. | Dubai Art Lovers Association |
Advay - Campus Show
| 2012 | TocH Engineering College, Kochi | Benny Dayal, Jyotsna, Sithara Krishnakumar, Franco, Anwar Saduth, Berny, etc. | Toc H Engineering College |
Sumithra Guha Live
| 2012 | Kochi | Padma Sree Sumithra Guha and team | Choice Group |
Mridu Malhar
| 2011 | Infosys Campus, Trivandrum | Pndt. Ramesh Narayanan, Berny, Madhushree, Madhuvanthi, Aditya Narayan Banerjee, Attukal Balu etc. | Infosys |
Infrastructural Conference - Musical Eve
| 2011 | Taj Vivanta, Trivandrum | Pndt. Ramesh Narayanan, Berny, Madhushree, Madhuvanthi, Prakash Ulliyeri etc. | Department of Public Works, Govt. of Kerala |
Veeraputhran - Audio Release
| 2011 | Mascot Hotel, Trivandrum | Pndt. Ramesh Narayanan, Berny, Madhushree, Madhuvanthi, Prakash Ulliyeri etc. | ITL Productions |
Advay - Campus Show
| 2011 | TocH Engineering College, Kochi | Naresh Iyer, Manoj George, Bennette etc. | Toc H Engineering College |
Mridu Malhar
| 2011 | JT PAC, Kochi | Pndt. Ramesh Narayanan, Dilshad Khan, Berny, Madhushree, Madhuvanthi, Prakash Ulliyeri etc. | Sathyam Audios |
Painting Campaign - World Forestry Day
| 2011 | Marine Drive, Kochi | C. N. Karunakaran and thousands of College Students | Toc H Engineering College |
TaalAtma
| 2011 | JT PAC, Kochi | Aditi Bhagwath, Saylee Talwalkar, Ravi Chary, Mughul Gongre etc. | Choice Group |
Soul Electric - The Band
| 2011 | Infosys Campus, Trivandrum | Anvar Saduth, Josy, Manoj George etc. | Infosys |
S 36 - The Band
| 2011 | JT PAC, Kochi | Sreesanth, Josy, Anoop Nair etc. | S-36 The Band |
Conjura - Campus Show
| 2010 | TKM Engineering College, Kollam | Vijay Prakash and the Band | TKM Engineering College |
Advay - Campus Show
| 2010 | TocH Engineering College, Kochi | Balabhaskar, Anoop Nair, Mahesh Mani etc. | Toc H Engineering College |
In Comedy Nagar
| 2010 | Various cities in USA | Ramesh Pisharody, Kulappulli Leela, Guinness Pakru, Manoj Guinness etc. | OneTel INC, USA |
Sunaadha
| 2010 | JT PAC, Kochi | U. Srinivas, U. Rajesh, Prakash Ulliyeri etc. | Choice Group |
Jingala
| 2010 | Malappuram | S. P. Balasubramanyam, Benny Dayal, Manjari, Vidhu Prathap, Aruna Thampy, Stephen Devassy, Manoj George, Ramesh Pisharody, Salim Kumar | Swanthwanam Charitable Trust |
Ghazal Eve
| 2009 | Various cities in USA | Jithesh Sundharam and team | Accossi Productions INC, USA |
Ghazal Nite
| 2009 | Classic Avenue Hotel, Trivandrum | Pndt. Ramesh Narayanan, Prakash Ulliyeri, Praful Athle etc. | Classic Avenue Hotel |
Dhundhubhi
| 2009 | JT PAC, Kochi | Pndt. Ramesh Narayanan, Sivamani, Ravi Chary, Satyajit Talwalkar, Stephen Devassy etc. | Choice Group |
Conjura - The Campus Show
| 2009 | TKM Engineering College, Kollam | Naresh Iyer, Stephen Devassy etc. | TKM Engineering College |
Music For Charity
| 2006 | Dr. Ambedkar Stadium, Kochi | Deepak Dev, Alphons Joseph, Yesudas, Jayachandran, M. G. Sreekumar, Sujatha, Vineeth Sreenivasan, Swetha Mohan, Jassie Gift, Rimi Tomy, Jyotsna, Vijay Yesudas, Sayanora Philip, Nadirsha, Dev Anand, Pradeep Babu, Guinness Pakru, Tini Tom etc. | Kerala Auxiliary Force |
