= Murphy (film) =

Indian science fiction drama film

- Theatrical release poster
- Directed by: BSP Varma
- Written by: BSP Varma; Prabhu Mundkur
- Dialogues by: Naveen G. Reddy; BSP Varma; Prabhu Mundkur
- Produced by: Ramco Somanna; BSP Varma
- Starring: Prabhu Mundkur; Roshni Prakash; Ila Veermalla; H. G. Dattatreya
- Cinematography: Adarsha R.
- Edited by: Mahesh Thogata
- Music by: Songs: Arjun Janya; Sylvester Pradeep; Rajat Hegde; Keerthan Holla; Score: Sylvester Pradeep
- Production companies: Somanna Talkies; VarnaSindhu Studios
- Distributed by: Goldie Films
- Release date: 18 October 2024
- Running time: 136 minutes
- Country: India
- Language: Kannada

Murphy is a 2024 Indian Kannada-language science fiction drama film co-written and directed by BSP Varma. The film features Prabhu Mundkur, Roshni Prakash, Ila Veermalla, and H. G. Dattatreya in lead roles, alongside Ashwin Rao Pallakki, Mahantesh Hiremath, Rramprasadd Banavara, BSP Varma, and Master Dhawan in supporting roles.

== Cast ==
- Prabhu Mundkur as David Murphy
- Roshni Prakash as Janani
- Ila Veermalla as Jessie
- H. G. Dattatreya as Richard
- Ashwin Rao Pallakki
- Mahantesh Hiremath
- Rramprasadd Banavara
- BSP Varma
- Master Dhawan

== Production ==
=== Development ===
B. S. Pradeep Varma, who made his directorial debut with the 2017 film Urvi, collaborated with Prabhu Mundkur, who played a supporting role in Urvi, to write the script. Varma shared a story called Radio with Prabhu, and they developed it since it fit their envisioned budget. They began writing during the 2020 COVID-19 lockdown and completed the script in a year and a half. Prabhu also served as the executive producer and associate director of the film. On 15 September 2020, Nishvika Naidu was announced as the female lead. However, in 2021, director Varma approached Roshni Prakash, who was then filming Lucky Man, to replace Nishvika. After hearing the narration, Roshni felt an instant connection with the character Janani and decided to collaborate with Varma. Ila Veermalla, who debuted as a child artist in the 2012 film Ball Pen, auditioned for and secured the lead role of Jessy. Apart from acting in the lead role, Ila also worked as both an assistant director and costume designer for the film.

=== Filming ===
Principal photography commenced on 2 April 2021 in Mangalore, with the first schedule wrapping up on 15 April 2021. Filming in Goa, initially slated for 3 May 2021, was postponed due to the COVID-19 pandemic. Production resumed once lockdown restrictions eased. The film was primarily shot in Goa, while a few portions were filmed on the Karnataka coast. Major portions of the film were reportedly shot in a 400-year-old mansion in Goa. Additionally few scenes were shot at St. Aloysius, Mangalore. The film received a U certificate from the Central Board of Film Certification.

== Soundtrack ==
The soundtrack consists of songs composed by Arjun Janya, Sylvester Pradeep, Rajat Hegde, and Keerthan Holla, while the background score was by Sylvester Pradeep.

Track listing
| No. | Title | Lyrics | Music | Singer(s) | Length |
|---|---|---|---|---|---|
| 1. | "Ilege Banda Maleye" | Sampath Sirimane | Rajat Hegde, Keerthan Holla | K. S. Harisankar | 4:32 |
| 2. | "Mogachi" | Dhananjay Ranjan | Arjun Janya | Rajath Hegde, Nadia Rebelo | 3:58 |
| 3. | "Samaya" | Dhananjay Ranjan | Arjun Janya | Rajath Hegde | 3:18 |
| Total length: | | | | | 11:48 |

== Release ==
Murphy was initially slated for release on 27 September 2024. However, the release date was subsequently changed, and it was released on 18 October 2024.

== Reception ==
Kavya Christopher of The Times of India rated the film three-and-a-half out of five stars and wrote that "Murphy marks yet another effort by the Kannada film industry that ably works towards delivering what the film industry and its audience require - a content-driven story." Y. Maheswara Reddy of Bangalore Mirror gave it three-and-a-half out of five stars and wrote that "Director BS Pradeep Varma has tried to tell a fresh love story in a unique style. Varma has ensured the film is of top quality and made the cast follow the script faithfully." Shashiprasad S. M. of Times Now gave it three out of five stars and wrote that "Are you a fan of time travel, with a soft spot for romantic dramas that delve deep into human emotions? If so, Murphy is a must-watch. The film stands out for its impressive storytelling and strong performances, making it a memorable experience." Pranati A. S. of Deccan Herald gave it three out of five stars and opined that "While the film succeeds in creating a fantasy world, Varma brings us back to reality by introducing reason and emotion into the narrative. This could either disappoint you or relieve you, depending on how you prefer your ending. An interesting watch."

A. Sharadhaa of Cinema Express wrote that "Murphy offers a fresh perspective on a unique genre. There are films with such stories incorporating instruments like phones and ham radios that play key roles. However, director BS Pradeep Varma's Murphy distinguishes itself through its compelling concept centred on the radio and its connections that span time." Swaroop Kodur of The Hollywood Reporter India wrote that "Despite its music video-like execution, B.S. Pradeep Varma’s film works because it is conscious of its bright personality and the kind of impact it wants to have on us." Vivek M. V. of The Hindu wrote, "Murphy, starring Roshini Prakash and Prabhu Mundkur, explores relationships through the prism of time. The film has solid moments but struggles to stand firm as a whole". He felt "Murphy suffers from an identity crisis as the movie struggles to balance several relationships in a sci-fi plot. The predictability factor could hinder our experience as well."
