= Choo Mantar =

2025 Indian Kannada-language horror comedy film directed by Navneeth

- Theatrical release poster
- Directed by: Karvva Navneeth
- Written by: Karvva Navneeth
- Story by: Karvva Navneeth
- Produced by: Tarun Shivappa
- Starring: Sharan; Aditi Prabhudeva; Chikkanna; Meghana Gaonkar; Prabhu Mundkur; Rajani Bharadwaj
- Cinematography: Anup Kattukaran
- Edited by: Karvva Navneeth
- Music by: Title Track: Chandan Shetty; Songs & Score: Avinash R Basutkar
- Production company: Tharun Studios
- Release date: 10 January 2025
- Running time: 143 minutes
- Country: India
- Language: Kannada
- Box office: ₹5 crore

Choo Mantar is a 2025 Indian Kannada-language horror comedy film directed by Navneeth and produced by Tarun Shivappa under Tarun Studios banner. The film features Sharan, Meghana Gaonkar, Aditi Prabhudeva, Prabhu Mundkur, Chikkanna, Rajani Bharadwaj and others. The main plot of the film is said to be around exorcism.

Choo Mantar was announced in June 2022. The film was initially set to be released on 5 April 2024 but was postponed owing to production delays

== Plot ==
Gowtham, known as a famous paranormal expert "Dynamo", along with his teammates Akanksha, RJ and Nakul decide to explore the possibility of finding a treasure supposedly hidden beneath a dreaded and haunted place called Morgan House. The four of them are oblivious to the history of the place they are about to set foot in.

The original Morgan House was under the control of a British tax collector named George Morgan, who was in charge of collecting taxes from a nearby village. Morgan would ruthlessly collect taxes from them and loot their earnings. He would eventually learn about Mogra, a beautiful young woman from the village who was raised by the villagers as an orphan. Morgan fell in love with her and confessed his feelings to Mogra, who in turn accepted and became Morgan's treasured wife. Morgan, who worked for the East India Company, used to steal a portion of the collected taxes and falsify the tax returns, sharing the profits with his subordinates. He would secretly sell most belongings of the house and other items to traders outside India, getting diamonds in return.

The villagers, having eventually learnt of Morgan's treachery, banded together and launched an attack at Morgan's estate, killing the guards. In the ensuing struggle, Morgan emerges victorious, although he is betrayed by Mogra, who, out of greed, kills him and desires to rule over the village. In his dying breath, Morgan draws his pistol and shoots Mogra, killing her. The mansion remains haunted since.

== Cast ==
- Sharan as Gowtham and Dynamo
- Aditi Prabhudeva as Akanksha/Clara DiCosta
- Chikkanna as RJ aka Ramesh Jadugar
- Meghana Gaonkar as Catherine
- Prabhu Mundkur as Alex
- Rajani Bharadwaj as Mogra
- Gurukiran as George Morgan
- Om Prakash Rao as Director
- Vijay Chendoor as Ali
- Dharma as Inspector Avinash
- Srinivas Prabhu
- Shankar Ashwath
- Kiran
- Avinash as Acharya Ramachandra, Cameo appearance
- Vishnuvardhan as captain, Cameo appearance

== Production ==
The film was announced and went on floors in June 2022. Shooting took place in London, Sri Lanka, Kerala, Uttarakhand, Mysuru and Bengaluru. Shooting was completed in record time by December 2022. Sharan was reported to play the role of an paranormal expert. Actor was reported to play a cameo role in the film. The team also confirmed that the film will have a grand 50 minutes of VFX. The film is said to have a hyperlinked narrative of three stories with a common factor binding them.

=== Marketing ===
The first look of the movie was released by Crazy Star V. Ravichandran on January 2, 2023. A special birthday teaser for the lead actor Sharan was released on 6 Feb 2023.

== Soundtrack ==
Choomantar

Soundtrack album by Chandan Shetty & Avinash R Basuthkar
- Released: 2024
- Recorded: 2024
- Genre: Soundtrack
- Length: 4:01
- Label: Anand Audio
- Producer: Chandan Shetty

The music is composed by Chandan Shetty and the background music is composed by Avinash R. Basuthkar. The first song titled "Choo Mantar" was released on 11 September 2023.

Tracklist
No.	Title	Lyrics	Singer(s)	Length
1.	"Choo Mantar"	Vijay Eshwar	Chandan Shetty	4:01
2.	"The Greed Song"	Vijay Eshwar, Avinash R. Basuthkar	Madhuri Sheshadri, Avinash R. Basuthkar, Navneeth	4:23

== Release ==
The movie was initially set to be released on 5 April 2024 but was pushed further to May 10 and once again owing to production delays. However it was also reported that the makers were aiming for a pan Indian release.

== Reception ==
The Movie received mixed reviews from critics, with opinions varying on its blend of horror and humor. Vivek M. V. From The Hindu wrote that the film is filled with twists but lacks the ability to evoke fear, stating, “Sharan and Chikkanna’s comedy shines in parts, but the film struggles to balance horror and drama, falling short of engaging the audience despite some novelty in storytelling.” The Times of India’s Sridevi S. noted, “The film attempts to blend horror and comedy but doesn’t fully succeed in either, with minimal scares and inconsistent humor, though Sharan’s performance is a highlight.” A. Sharadhaa of The New Indian Express offered a more positive take, writing, “The film’s playful spin on the supernatural genre is refreshing, with Sharan’s energetic performance keeping it engaging, though the climax feels rushed and predictable.” Conversely, Deccan Herald’s Pranati A. S. was critical, stating, “This horror-comedy neither delivers laughs nor chills, with a disjointed plot and ineffective scares, making it neither funny nor memorable.” Similarly, Shashiprasad S. M. of Times Now remarked, “The film is a dull horror-comedy that fails to haunt or entertain, with a predictable storyline and uninspired execution.”
