= Maryade Prashne =

Indian revenge drama film

- Theatrical release poster
- Directed by: Nagaraj Somayaji
- Screenplay by: Nagaraj Somayaji
- Dialogues by: Nagaraj Somayaji
- Story by: RJ Pradeepa
- Produced by: Shwetha R. Prasad; Vidya Gandhi Rajan
- Starring: Rakesh Adiga; Sunil Raoh; Poornachandra Mysore; Teju Belawadi; Prabhu Mundkur; Rekha Kudligi; Shine Shetty
- Cinematography: Sandeep Valluri
- Edited by: Sanketh Shivappa
- Music by: Arjun Ramu
- Production company: Sakkath Studio
- Distributed by: Lilac Entertainments
- Release date: 22 November 2024
- Running time: 119 minutes
- Country: India
- Language: Kannada

Maryade Prashne (transl. Question of Respect) is a 2024 Indian Kannada-language revenge drama film directed by debutant Nagaraj Somayaji from a story by RJ Pradeepa. The film stars Rakesh Adiga, Sunil Raoh, Poornachandra Mysore, Teju Belawadi, Prabhu Mundkur, Rekha Kudligi and Shine Shetty. The plot involves a fatal accident, which when takes the life of their friend (Raoh), two young men (Adiga and Poornachandra) are drawn into a pursuit of revenge and justice.

Shwetha R. Prasad and Vidya Gandhi Rajan produced the film under the banner Sakkath Studio. The music was composed by Arjun Ramu, while cinematography and editing were handled by Sandeep Valluri and Sanketh Shivappa. Upon theatrical release, the film received mixed reviews from critics, who praised its performances and themes but criticized its screenplay. The film received two nominations at the 70th Filmfare Awards South, both for Best Supporting Actor – Kannada (Nagendra Shah and Prabhu Mundkur).

== Plot ==
Satisha, Suri, and Manja are close friends from middle-class backgrounds living in Bengaluru. Satisha works as a food-delivery executive and supports his family, which includes his ailing father, mother, and younger sister Lakshmi. Burdened by a loan exceeding ₹10 lakh, he postpones marriage until he can repay his debts. Manja works as a cab driver, while Suri is an ambitious ward member who hopes to contest local body elections under the patronage of MLA Suresh. The three friends celebrate Satisha's birthday, and after a drinking session, ride home together on a rainy night. Their motorbike is struck by an SUV, killing Satisha instantly. The occupants of the vehicle persuade Suri and Manja not to approach the police and offer compensation, promising to provide more money later.

Satisha's death devastates his family. Hoping to secure the promised compensation for them, Suri and Manja visit the address given by the SUV occupants but are humiliated and turned away. The group consists of Shetty, a relatively sympathetic associate, and his affluent friends Rakesh "Rocky", Nikhil, and Parmesh Kumar "PK". Upon learning that her brother's friends lied to her about the details of Satisha's death, Lakshmi files a police complaint, resulting in Suri and Manja being detained and assaulted in custody before Suresh's men secure their release. Meanwhile, tensions emerge within Rocky's circle. Rocky orchestrates the murder of Nikhil through the Nikhil's partner by poisoning him and disguising the death as the result of excessive consumption of sexual-enhancement drugs. The incident is subsequently covered up to avoid scandal. Rocky's motive stems from a failed business venture that had caused a fallout between him and Nikhil.

Determined to avenge Satisha's death, Suri and Manja begin tracking Rocky and PK. Shetty approaches them and reveals that he too has grievances against Rocky, who owes him money, and offers assistance in bringing him down. Suspicious of his intentions, Suri rejects the proposal and continues pursuing Rocky independently. As pressure mounts, Rocky's personal life also begins to unravel when his extramarital affair is discovered by his wife. Fearful of retaliation, Rocky becomes increasingly paranoid as Suri and Manja close in on him.

The conflict culminates when Rocky and PK are taken hostage. Shetty arrives with the compensation money that had originally been promised following the accident. During the confrontation, Manja shoots Rocky and seriously injures him. To protect his friend, Suri assumes responsibility for the crime and is arrested. Shetty delivers the money to Satisha's family, fulfilling the commitment that had long been denied to them. While facing imprisonment, Suri finds solace in the belief that he has upheld his dignity and loyalty by standing by his friends and ensuring justice for Satisha's family.

== Cast ==
- Rakesh Adiga as Suri
- Sunil Raoh as Satisha
- Poornachandra Mysore as Manja
- Prabhu Mundkur as Rakesh "Rocky"
- Teju Belawadi as Lakshmi
- Shine Shetty as Shetty
- Shravan Kumar as Parmesh Kumar "PK"
- Hariharan V. as Nikhil
- Mahesh Kumar Nanjundaiah as Japan
- Shwetha R. Prasad as Meera, Rocky's wife
- Nagendra Shah as Satisha's father
- Rekha Kudligi as Savitri, Satisha's mother
- Pruthvi Banwasi as Suri's father
- T. S. Nagabharana as MLA Suresh
- Prakash Thuminad as Sundar, MLA's PA
- Nandagopal as SI Raghavendra
- Dayal Padmanabhan as retired Police Commissioner
- Manju Pavagada as Pacchi, Satisha's friend
- Rohith Srinath as Kumar, Nikhil's father
- Uma Hebbar as legislator
- Nitesh Nittur as car shed owner
- Roopa Rayappa as Nisha
- Ashwini as Raksha

== Production ==
The story of the film was written by RJ Pradeepa, who also serves as the creative head. The screenplay and dialogues were written by Nagaraj Somayaji. The film was produced by Shwetha R Prasad and Vidya Gandhi Rajan under the banner Sakkath Studio. Poornachandra Mysore plays the role of a cab driver in the film. The film was primarily shot in Bangalore's Chamarajpet, Indiranagar, and Koramangala over a period of fifty-five days. The cinematography was by Sandeep Valluri. The editing was handled by Sanketh Shivappa.

== Soundtrack ==
The soundtrack was composed by Arjun Ramu. The first single, "Easy Take it Easy" was released on 17 October 2024. The third single, "Phirako Maar" was released on 18 November 2024.

Track listing
No.	Title	Lyrics	Singer(s)	Length
1.	"Easy Take it Easy"	Pramod Maravante	Sharan	4:18
2.	"Naa Ninage Nee Nanage"	Pramod Maravante	Vasuki Vaibhav, Srilakshmi Belmannu	3:36
3.	"Phirako Maar"	Pasha Bhai, Mohammed Imraz Ahmed	Pasha Bhai	2:38
Total length:				10:32

== Release ==
The film was released theatrically on 22 November 2024.

== Reception ==
Sridevi S of The Times of India rated the film three-and-a-half out of five stars and wrote that "RJ Pradeepa’s well-intentioned story gets a good, grounded narrative under Nagaraj Somayaji’s direction. The climax scene serves as a perfect bookend to this preachy film that depicts the survival story of the middle-class with revenge drama as its core plot." A Sharadhaa of The New Indian Express gave the film three-and-a-half out of five stars and wrote that "With Pradeepa’s production venture at the helm, the film succeeds in showcasing the grit and integrity of the middle class. In a world where dignity and self-respect are sometimes all one has, Maryade Prashne reminds us that no matter how wealthy or powerful the other side may be, no money or recommendation can buy class or humanity."

Y Maheswara Reddy of Bangalore Mirror gave it three-and-a-half out of five stars and noted that "Director Nagaraj Somayaji has made sure that his movie connects to all categories of audiences by ensuring elements such as emotions, love, action, and crime. The movie also showcases the value of friendship and sacrifices made by close friends for each other." Shashiprasad SM of Times Now gave it three out of five stars and wrote that "RJ Pradeepa’s debut film, produced under his banner Sakkath Studio, makes a promising start with a grounded narrative that explores the challenges of middle-class life. It thoughtfully depicts their ongoing struggle for survival, all while preserving their respect and dignity at any cost."

Pranati A S of Deccan Herald gave it two-and-a-half out of five stars and opined that "However, performances alone cannot save this stereotyped representation of Bengaluru’s class divide. The film fails to evoke the necessary emotions to make for a gripping watch. The second half of the film turns so preachy that it seems agenda driven — with an aim to further propagate the stereotypes surrounding the middle class." Latha Srinivasan of Hindustan Times wrote that "While the theme for the need for respect is included in the story, the story also suddenly veers off into the direction of drunk driving and how tragedies around that affect the lives of people. The director and writer have tried to combine the two to show how this affects the middle class but does the film do justice to this? Sadly no."

Vivek M. V. of The Hindu wrote, "Helped by fine performances, Maryade Prashne is a relevant commentary on the class divide but the film suffers from an unfocused screenplay". Subha J Rao of The News Minute wrote, "The film’s intent is commendable, and the way they have shot it ensures you never lose sight of the intent. And, after an incident, the friends don’t touch a drop of alcohol. Which conveys the message better than a lengthy dialogue would have."
