= Jada (2019 film) =

Indian Tamil language sports drama

- Theatrical release poster
- Directed by: Kumaran
- Produced by: Vignesh Rajagopal
- Starring: Kathir; Roshini Prakash
- Cinematography: A.R. Soorya
- Edited by: Richard Kevin A
- Music by: Sam C. S
- Production company: The Poet Studios
- Release date: 6 December 2019
- Running time: 132 minutes
- Country: India
- Language: Tamil

Jada is a 2019 Indian Tamil-language sports drama film directed by Kumaran. The film stars Kathir and Roshini Prakash, while Kishore and Yogi Babu play supporting roles. It was released on 6 December 2019.

== Plot ==
Jada is a fearless young football player in North Chennai. His coach tells him to play well so that he can get selected in Santhosh Trophy and eventually secure a job in sports quota. But Jada wants to avenge the death of his childhood football hero Sethu who died in the violent 7s football. The local government has banned the 7s football but the neighbourhood football committee lifts the ban after ten years. Jada and his teammates enroll in the 7s football tournament.

== Cast ==
- Kathir as Jada
- Roshini Prakash
- Yogi Babu as Messi
- Kishore as Sethu
- A. P. Sreethar as Naren
- Rajkumar as Raju
- Arun Alexander as Elango
- Lijeesh as Aravind
- Shanmugam Muthusamy as Dheena
- Kulothungan
- Nishanth as Jada's friend
- Gowtham Selvaraj as Anto
- Arun Prasath as Jada's friend
- Aruvi Balaji as Jada's friend
- Mahesh G
- Swathishta as Lakshmi
- Prajuna Sarah
- Adithya TV Lokesh Pop Aady as commentator
- Anjana KR as Sethu's Wife
- Joshua as Child Jada
- KPY Sarath
- Tiger Garden Thangadurai as Football commentator
- Nivas Adithan as Opposite team leader

== Production ==
The film was announced by debutant director Kumaran with the concept of sports based film with the lead actor Kathir playing the role of a footballer. The filmmakers hired Kathir in the male lead role after his breakthrough performance in the film Pariyerum Perumal and newcomer Roshini in the female lead role.

== Soundtrack ==
Soundtrack was composed by Sam C. S. A single, "Apdi Paakaadhadi" was released on 23 November 2019.

Track listing
No.	Title	Singer(s)	Length
1.	"Apdi Paakadhadi"	Anirudh Ravichander, Swagatha S. Krishnan
2.	"Olamikka"	Sathyaprakash
3.	"Tarrake"	Benny Dayal

== Critical reception ==
The Times of India's Thinkal Menon wrote, "Having set up a predictable, but decent premise in the beginning, the screenplay goes downhill in the second half". Sify wrote, "Tamil cinema has come up with yet another half-baked sports film Jada. Debutant filmmaker Kumaran has delivered a disappointing film with poorly written characters, shoddy screenplay and diametrically two opposite halves. While the first half revolves around 7s football, the director introduces horror elements in the second half and unfortunately both the genres are not justified". Sreedhar Pillai wrote for Firstpost, "Jada is a confused mess that lacks a proper script and narration and is neither a sports drama nor a horror thriller and falls between two stools". Mani Prabhu of The New Indian Express wrote, "what must have been a high-stakes emotional drama ends up as a dull genre-bender, because of the uninspired writing". Baradwaj Rangan wrote for Film Companion, "Whether pure genre or a mix, what matters is the writing. And that's all over the place. The football itself is reduced to a lesser version of the game we saw in the first half…".
