= Srikanth (Kannada film editor) =

Indian film editor and television producer

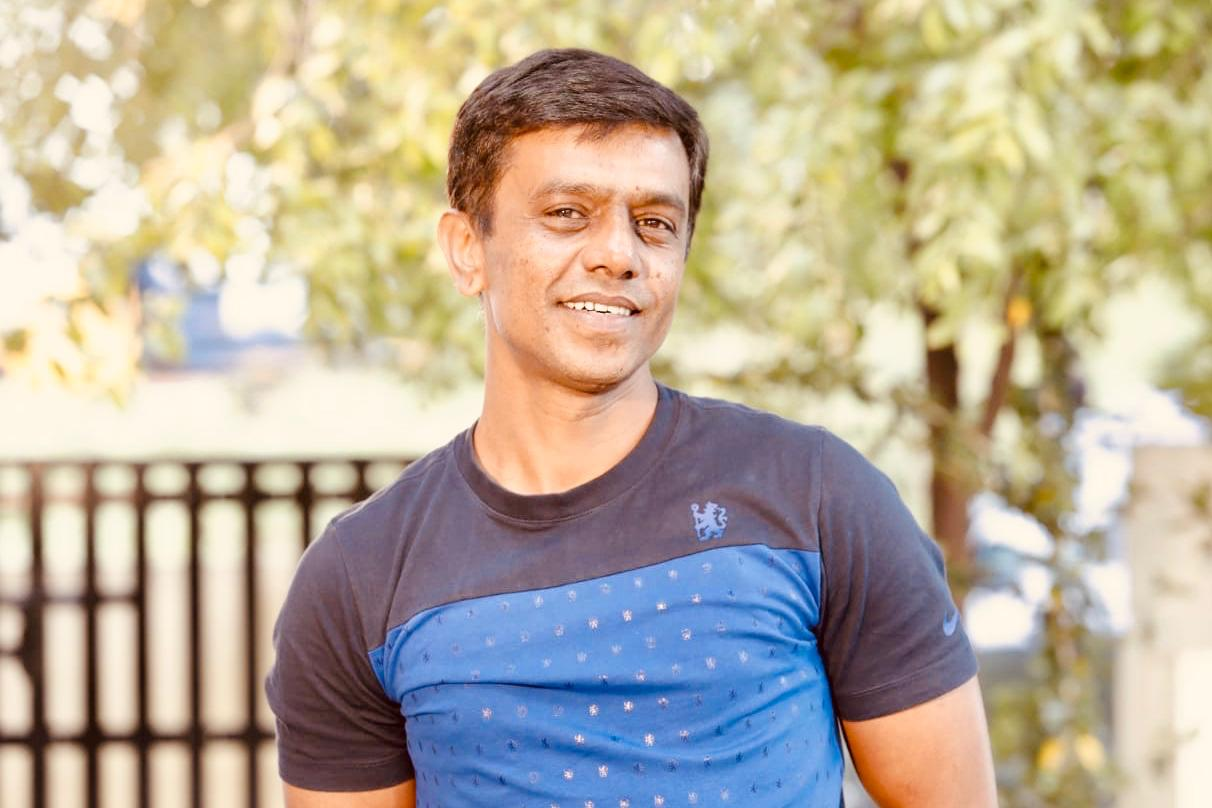
- Occupations: Film editor, VFX Artist
- Years active: 2003–present
- Spouse: Manjula
- Children: 2

Srikanth is an Indian film editor and television producer known for his work in Kannada cinema.

== Career ==
Srikanth joined as an office boy at Visionworld, Bangalore in 1996. Later he joined in Mohan Studio and then in Balaji Telefilms and worked for many famous serials like Maneyondhu Mooru Baagilu, Kunkuma Bhagya and many others produced by Balaji Telefilms and worked for documentaries, feature films, and episodes on Suprabhata channel, Udaya TV, ETV, ZEE TV channels. He started his own studio in 2003 by name "Srikanth Studios", and produced a serial Katakateya Kathegalu, which was telecasted in Zee Kannada. He worked on a documentary for Film Division Mumbai titled Ganga Kaveri in the year 2009, on plastic waste awareness for the BBMP. He is the editor for the Tulu film Madipu. Srikanth has produced a Kannada Serial Varalakshmi Stores which telecasts on Star Suvarna Channel. He has edited films like Ugramm and K.G.F: Chapter 1.

== Filmography ==
=== Films ===
Year	Film	Notes
2009	Auto	
2009	Minugu	
2009	Mussanjeya Gelathi	
2009	O Preethiye	
2009	Murali Meets Meera	
2009	House Full	
2011	Bhadra	
2011	Jala	
2011	Kolminchu	
2012	Pandya	
2012	Jasmine.5	
2012	Chaturbhuja	
2014	Ugramm	
2015	Vascodigama	
2015	Rathavara	
2015	Alone	
2016	Karaioram	Tamil film
2016	Badmaash	
2016	Akira	
2016	Ishtakamya	
2017	Madipu	Tulu film
2017	Manasu Mallige	
2017	BB5	
2017	Siliconn City	
2017	Kireeta	
2017	Kariya 2	
2017	Seizer	
2017	Double Engine	
2017	Tiger Galli	
2017	Diamond Cross	
2017	Vichitra	
2018	Atakuntu Lekkakilla	
2018	Chavadi	
2018	Vaasu Naan Pakka Commercial	
2018	K.G.F: Chapter 1	
2018	Moolabhutha Karana	
2018	Bypass Road	
2018	Parvesha	
2018	Munduvaridha Adhyaaya	
2018	Meena Bazar	
2018	Godhra	
2018	Kapatanaataka Paathradhaari	
2018	Relax Satya	
2018	Ontara Bannagalu	
2020	3rd Class	
2020	Krishna Talkies	
2020	Mundhu Varidha Adhaya	
2020	Varna Patla	
2021	Rangasamudra	
2022	Spooky College	
2026	Kendada Seragu	
TBA	A Beautiful Breakup	English film

=== Television and other works ===
Year	Name	Type	Role
2003	Katakateya Kathegalu	Television Serial	Producer
2016	Dibbaradindi	Album Song	Editor
2016	Me and the Parcel	Short Film	Editor
2018	Mundina Badalavane	Short Film	Editor
2020	Varalakshmi Stores	Television Serial	Producer
