= Roshni Prakash =

Indian film actress and model

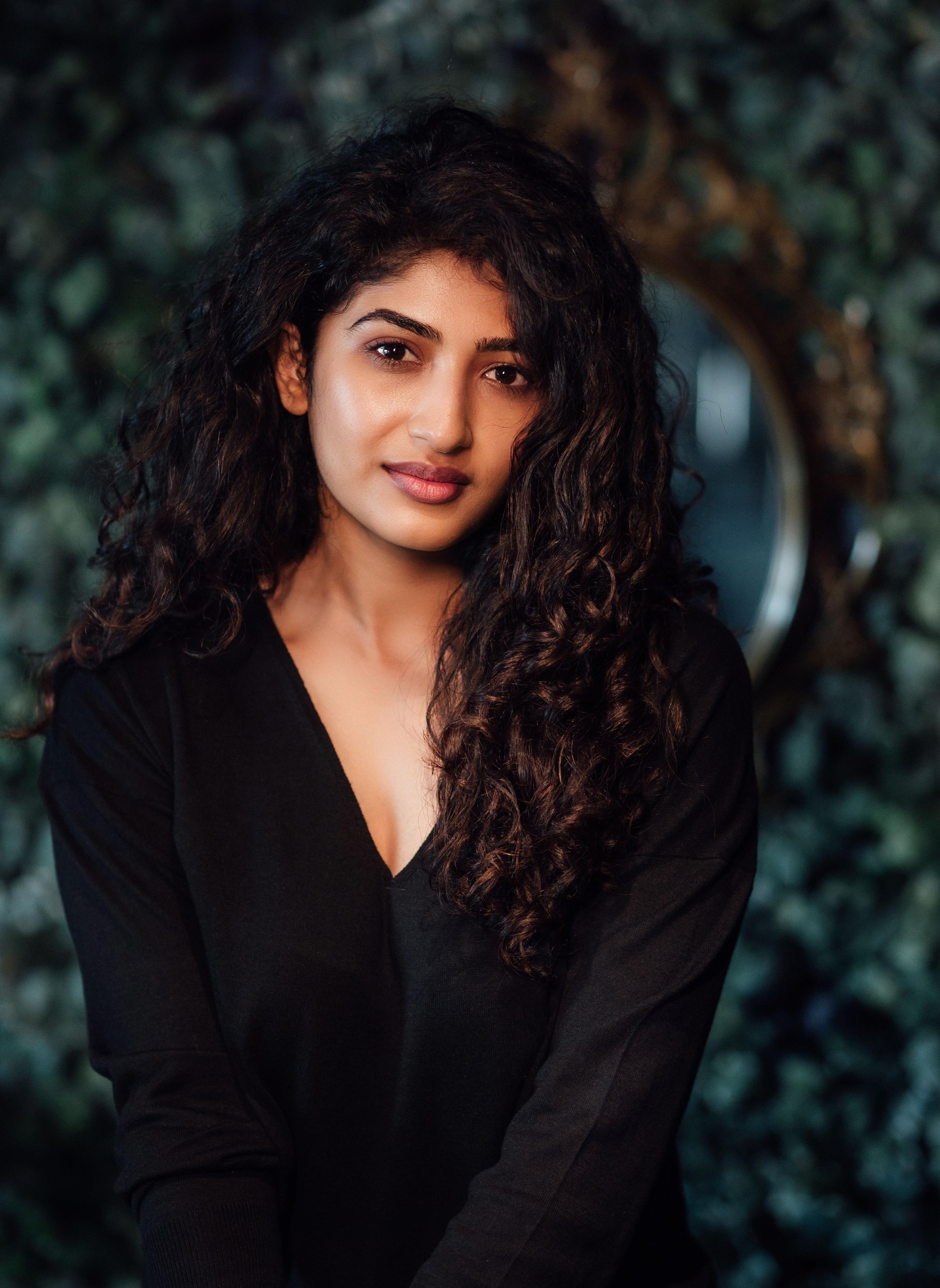
- Born: 23 September 1993 (age 33); Mysore, Karnataka
- Occupation: Actress
- Years active: 2016–present

Roshni Prakash is an Indian actress and model who works in South Indian film industry. She was a finalist in Femina Miss India South in 2016. After making her film debut in 2016 with the Telugu film Saptagiri Express, she appeared in the Kannada films Ajaramara and Kavaludaari and Tamil film Jada in 2019.

== Early life ==
Prakash grew up in Mysore, Karnataka. She was trained in bharatanatyam dancing and graduated from college with a degree in engineering. Although she was accepted into a master's program in Australia, she decided to pursue acting after being asked to audition for a role.

== Career ==
She made her debut in the 2016 Telugu film Saptagiri Express, directed by Arun Pawar. In 2017, she debuted in Sandalwood with the films Ajaraamara and Tiger Galli. In 2018 she appeared in the Kollywood film Yemaali, directed by V. Z. Durai.

In 2019, she played the female lead in the Kannada film Kavaludaari. She acted as Janani in the Kannada science fiction film Murphy (2024). She played the role of the small-town girl Tina in Vanangaan (2025), directed by Bala.

== Filmography ==
Key
†	Denotes films that have not yet been released

Year	Title	Role	Language	Notes
2016	Saptagiri Express	Poornima	Telugu	
2017	Ajaraamara	Ambuja (Ammu)	Kannada	
2017	Tiger Galli	Meera	Kannada	
2018	Yemaali	Divya	Tamil	
2019	Kavaludaari	Priya	Kannada	
2019	Jada		Tamil	
2020	47 Days	Paddu	Telugu	Released on Zee5
2021	11th Hour	Ragini	Telugu	Web series; released on Aha
2021	Buy 1 Get 1 Free	Meera	Kannada	
2022	Lucky Man	Meera	Kannada	
2023	Gandeevadhari Arjuna	Sruthi	Telugu	
2024	Dhonima	Dhanam	Tamil	
2024	Murphy	Janani	Kannada	Nominated- Filmfare Award for Best Actress- Kannada
2024	The Mystery of Moksha Island	Nilya	Telugu	Web series; released on Disney + Hotstar
2025	Vanangaan	Tina	Tamil	
2025	Mark	Sanchana	Kannada	
