= Prabhu Mundkur =

Indian model and actor

- Born: Narasimha Prabhu Mundkur; 5 December 1988 (age 37); Manipal, Udupi .Karnataka, India
- Education: St. Aloysius College (Mangalore); University of Madras
- Occupations: Actor, Writer
- Years active: 2017–present
- Spouse: Kavita (m. 2012)
- Children: 3

Prabhu Mundkur is an Indian film actor who hails from Manipal. He started his career with Kannada television soap Kulavadhu in 2016. His movie debut happened in 2017 through Urvi, a critically acclaimed movie in the Kannada film industry.

== Early life and family ==
Prabhu Mundkur was born on 5 December 1988 to a Konkani speaking orthodox family in Manipal, in Udupi. He completed his schooling at Bangalore and Udupi and graduated from St. Aloysius College, Mangalore. He also holds a post graduate degree in Applied Microbiology from the University of Madras. Prior to pursuing acting, he worked as a research associate for Biocon and ITC Limited. He married Kavita Kudtarkar (Nakshatra Prabhu) in 2012 and they have a daughter and twin boy and girl.

== Film career ==
After earning a postgraduate degree in Applied Microbiology and working as a research scientist, Prabhu Mundkur transitioned into acting via television and short films before debuting in Kannada cinema with Urvi (2017). He gained early notice in the non-linear thriller Maya Kannadi (2020), where critics observed that “Mundkur portrays the different shades admirably” ⸺ a testament to his range and versatility. In Ranchi (2023), he portrayed Deepak, an aspiring filmmaker enmeshed in crime; The Times of India praised him, stating “Prabhu Mundkur easily scores a century as the lead,” while ZoomTV highlighted his “nuanced performance that captures the essence of a filmmaker caught in crime and deception.”

In Maryade Prashne (2024), Mundkur turned heads playing Rocky, a privileged and morally grey antagonist. The Times of India review noted he was the “biggest surprise package” on screen, while Deccan Herald wrote he “steals the show” as a “filthy-rich brat,” and the Film Critics Guild observed that the film “shines thanks to the writing, framing and performances,” with specific praise for Mundkur’s portrayal of entitlement and arrogance. During promotion, Mundkur described Rocky as “an epitome of a spoilt brat,” emphasising the complexity of exploring privilege and villainy.

=== Breakthrough with Murphy (2024) ===
In Murphy (2024), Mundkur took on a multi-hyphenate role—co-writing, serving as associate director and producer, and starring in a dual time‑travel role. The New Indian Express observed he “delivers a neat performance that adeptly captures a wide spectrum of emotions,” while Hollywood Reporter India praised how he “essays his dual role with ease… separating the two characters with subtle shifts in body language.” Though the film had modest theatrical footfalls (~30,000), it amassed over 3 million OTT views within two weeks. Fans on X dubbed it “a dreamy cinematic visual poetry,” and outlets such as Cinema Express , Times Now , and Filmibeat emphasized its poetic visuals and content-driven narrative. Mundkur himself commented, “With Murphy , I can confidently say I have arrived,” underlining the personal significance of this project.

=== Recent and Upcoming Projects ===
In early 2025, Mundkur appeared in Choo Mantar (Jan 2025), a horror-comedy directed by Navneeth and produced by Tarun Studios, portraying Alex D’Costa. Reviews noted that “Prabhu Mundkur is fantastic as Alex D’Costa” (Deccan Herald ), and The Times of India said he “shines and grabs the opportunity” in his smaller role. Cinema Express added that he “leaves a lasting impression,” even among an ensemble cast, praising his screen presence. Meanwhile, OTTplay commented that he “does justice to what’s expected of him” in a genre-blending narrative. Maryade Prashne and Choo Mantar both demonstrated his ability to add depth even when not the central character.

== Filmography ==
†	Denotes films that have not yet been released

Year	Film	Role	Notes	Ref.
2017	Urvi	Prakash	Debut film	
2018	Double Engine	Sunil		
2019	D/O Parvathamma	Rajesh		
2019	Relax Satya	Sathya		
2020	Maya Kannadi	Sandy		
2022	Mysore Diaries	Likith		
2023	Ranchi	Deepak		
2024	Murphy	David	Also co-writer, Associate Director & Executive Producer	
2024	Maryade Prashne	Rocky	SIIMA Award for Best Actor in a Negative Role (Kannada); Nominated—Filmfare Award for Best Supporting Actor – Kannada	
2025	Choo Mantar	Alex		
