= Relax Satya =

2019 Kannada crime thriller film

- Directed by: Naveen Reddy G.
- Written by: Naveen Reddy G.
- Produced by: Mohan Kumar H. R. G. Mohan Reddy; Chethan R. B.
- Starring: Prabhu Mundkur; Manvitha
- Cinematography: Yogi
- Edited by: Srikanth
- Music by: Anand Rajavikram
- Production company: Red Dragon
- Release date: 15 November 2019
- Running time: 117 minutes
- Country: India
- Language: Kannada

Relax Satya is a 2019 Indian Kannada language crime thriller film written and directed by Naveen Reddy G. The film is produced by Mohan Kumar H. R., G. Mohan Reddy and Chethan B. R. under the banner Red Dragon. It features Prabhu Mundkur and Manvitha Kamath in the lead role. The score and soundtrack for the film is by Anand Rajavikram and the cinematography is by Yogi. The editing for the film was done by Srikanth. The film was released on 15 November 2019. The movie was reported to be inspired by the British film The Disappearance of Alice Creed (2019).

== Cast ==
- Prabhu Mundkur as Satya
- Manvitha Kamath as Maaya

== Release and reception ==
The film was released on 15 November 2019.

The Times of India paper gave 3 out of 5 stars stating "A quick-paced narration might have worked better for the film. It would have enhanced the suspense factor and kept the audience on the edge of their seats. Head to Relax Satya if crime thrillers are your cup of tea. Despite the length, this is a good attempt and is a relatively fresh story for the Kannada audiences."

== Soundtrack ==
The film's background score and the soundtracks are composed by Anand Rajavikram. The music rights were acquired by Ananda Audio.

Tracklist
No.	Title	Lyrics	Singer(s)	Length
1.	"Oh Vidhiye Kshamisu"	K. Naveen Kumar	Sanjith Hegde	3:14
2.	"Are Are Mounave"	Shankar Raman	Vyasaraj	3:40
3.	"Kshana Kashna"	Dhananjay Ranjan	Supriya Lohith, Sanjith Hegde	3:30
4.	"Ayyo Sathya"	Naveen Reddy G.	Chethan Gandharva	3:36
5.	"Sathya Theme"	---	---	1:13
Total length:				15:34
