= Tiger Galli =

- Theatrical release poster
- Directed by: Ravi Srivatsa
- Written by: K. V. Raju
- Produced by: Yogesh Kumar
- Starring: Sathish Ninasam; Roshni Prakash
- Cinematography: Mathew Rajan
- Edited by: Sujith Nayak; Srikanth
- Music by: Songs: Sridhar V. Sambhram; Score: BMR
- Release date: 27 October 2017
- Country: India
- Language: Kannada

Tiger Galli is a 2017 Indian Kannada-language action film directed by Ravi Srivatsa and starring Sathish Ninasam in a double role as Vishnu and Shiva.

== Plot ==
The film "Tiger Galli" is set in a Bengaluru neighbourhood controlled by criminals supported by corrupt politicians. Vishnu, a local youth, is forced to abandon his peaceful life and assist the police in eliminating these criminals after they threaten his family and business. Vishnu is aided by his twin brother Shiva, an IPS officer, and together they use street justice and legal authority to dismantle the criminal and political network, culminating in a courtroom climax.

== Cast ==
- Sathish Ninasam in a double role as
  - Vishnu, Shiva's twin brother
  - Shiva IPS officer, Vishnu's twin brother
- Roshni Prakash as Meera
- Yamuna as Durgamma
- Bhavana Rao
- Shivamani
- Ayyappa P. Sharma
- Giriraj
- Pooja Lokesh
- M. N. Lakshmi Devi

== Production ==
Sathish Ninasam called the film a throwback to 1990s action films.

== Reception ==
Deccan Chronicle gave the film a rating of one out of five stars and wrote that "Almost every character is greatly influenced by dialogue king Saikumar’s mannerism and it’s LOUD!". The New Indian Express wrote that "Tiger Galli is limited to those who don’t mind seeing bloodshed, harsh dialogues and several action sequences". The Times of India gave the film a rating of two out of five stars and wrote that "The climax of the film is a bit too stretched and the graphics are a major disappointment".
