= Mussanjeya Gelathi =

Indian film

- Promotional poster
- Directed by: B P Srinivas
- Produced by: B P Srinivas
- Starring: B P Srinivas; Shalini Srinivas
- Cinematography: S Sathish Kumar
- Edited by: H S Srikanth T Thota; C Ravichandran
- Music by: A M Neel
- Production company: Shri Ranganathaswamy Productions
- Release date: 4 September 2009
- Country: India
- Language: Kannada

Mussanjeya Gelathi (transl. Dusk/Twilight girlfriend) is a 2009 Indian Kannada-language film directed and produced by B P Srinivas starring himself and his daughter, Shalini Srinivas, in the lead roles.

== Cast ==
- B P Srinivas as Manjunatha Rao
- Shalini Srinivas as Pallavi
- Gaurav Venkatesh
- Sanketh Kashi
- Navaneeth Srinivas
- Ganashree
- Maina Chandru
- Suma Rao
- Vanishree

== Production ==
BP Srinivas wanted to cast Anant Nag for the lead role but instead played the role himself. He had previously acted in a negative role in Varasdara (2008). His daughter, Shalini, a PU II student of Kripanidhi College, Koramangala acted as his love interest. This is reportedly the first time that a real life father and daughter acted as a romantic pair in a film.

== Music ==
Mussanjeya Gelathi

Soundtrack album by A M Neel
- Released: 2009
- Recorded: 2009
- Genre: Feature film soundtrack
- Length: 25:36
- Language: Kannada

Official audio
- Mussanjeya Gelathi - Full Album on YouTube

Track listing
No.	Title	Singer(s)	Length
1.	"Ararare Birugaali"	Bhavya, Neel	4:22
2.	"Ho Manje Nee"	Lakshmi	5:21
3.	"Neene Naanu"	Neel, Supriya Ramakrishna	4:19
4.	"Ninna Maathu"	Neel	1:54
5.	"Ninna Mouna"	Neel	1:53
6.	"Mussanje Gelathi Theme"	Neel	4:16
7.	"Tutiya Anchalli"	Neel	4:51
Total length:			25:36

== Reception ==
=== Critical response ===
R G Vijayasarathy of Rediff.com scored the film at 2 out of 5 stars and says "For one, Srinivas has taken on too many responsibilities. While he shines as a director, as an actor he's not that good. Another drawback of the film is his daughter Shalini, who doesn't suit the role of a student. Mussanjeya Gelathi has a bold story which could have been executed in a better fashion". BS Srivani from Deccan Herald wrote "Mussanje Gelathi is bereft of direction though the producer takes credit for the same. He seems to have had a great picnic, at the expense of the viewers. This Mussanje Gelathi will neither dispel darkness nor fear". A critic from Bangalore Mirror wrote "Sadly, Srinivas is the biggest drawback of the film. He makes a decent effort in directing the film, but fails as an actor. With a seasoned actor in his place, the film might have gone places. Aided by some sedate scenes, Mussanje Gelati ends up with only two stars". Manju Shettar from Mid-Day wrote "Gaurav and Shalini's acting is good. Music is catchy and camera work is beautiful. Srinivas's acting does not impress the audience and dialogues are stale. Verdict: Watch it if you want to face a lot of confusion!".
