= Vaadhyar =

- Vaadhyar poster
- Directed by: Nidheesh Sakthi
- Written by: Rajesh Raghavan
- Produced by: N Sudhish
- Starring: Jayasurya; Ann Augustine; Menaka; Nedumudi Venu; Vijayaraghavan
- Cinematography: Pradeep Nair
- Edited by: Ranjan Abraham
- Music by: Manoj George; Rinil Gowtham
- Production company: Lakshminath Creations
- Distributed by: Kalasangham Films
- Release date: 8 June 2012
- Running time: 107 minutes
- Country: India
- Language: Malayalam

Vaadhyar (English: Teacher) is a 2012 Malayalam film directed by Nidheesh Sakthi (in his directorial debut) and written by Rajesh Raghavan, produced by N Sudhish under the banner of Lakshminath Creations, with the music composed by Manoj George and Rinil Gowtham. The film stars Jayasurya in the title role. The film is about an aided school teacher named Anoop Krishnan, his dream is to become an MBA holder, but circumstances force him to take up teaching as a profession. He is chosen to work at Kottapuram Saraswathi Vilasam U.P. School, he doesn't do his job properly as he works there with no interest and the problems that occur lead to the rest of the story.

== Plot ==
Headmistress Subadhra runs the impoverished Saraswathi Vilasam UP School. With insufficient amenities, she teaches and provides lunch to the unprivileged children of the region. Anoop Krishnan, a youth with ambitions of his own, is forced by his mother to follow his father's footsteps and become a school teacher. Reluctant Anoop is a dispassionate teacher, but a speech from an IAS officer, a student of his father's, inspires Anoop to become an exemplary teacher like his father was. Anoop improves the school and takes charge of the institution.

== Cast ==
- Jayasurya as Anoop Krishnan
- Ann Augustine as Hema
- Menaka as Head Mistress Subhadra
- Nedumudi Venu as Joseph Kuruvila
- Salim Kumar as Brother
- Harishree Ashokan as Suresh
- Vijayaraghavan as Narayanankutty Mash
- Jayakrishnan as Balagopalan IAS
- Manikandan Pattambi as Velu
- Anil Murali as Karthikeyan
- Seema G Nair as Deepa
- Renjusha Menon
- Vanitha Krishnachandran as Anoop's mother
- Ambika Mohan as Hema's mother

== Production ==
The film was launched by the lead actor Jayasurya on 19 April 2011. Veteran director Kamal and director Lal Jose lighted the ceremonial lamp at the function. Shooting of the film began on 5 May 2011 at Thrissur. Some portions of the film were shot at Government Engineering College, Thrissur. The shoot was on hold and started again in February.

== Release and reception ==
The film released on 8 June 2012 around 68 centres in Kerala, India.

=== Critical response ===
The movie got mixed to negative response from the critics. Rediff started that "It is a 'coming of age' story at one level, and transforms into something like Manikyakkallu (2011), where the hero fights against the powers that be who have ordered the closure of his school because of its non-performance and dwindling number of students"and gave it 1.5 out of 5 stars. Times of India rated it 2 out of 5 and told it is a subverted mix of elements that we enjoyed in movies like Taare Zameen Par.

== Soundtrack ==
Vaadhyar

Soundtrack album by Manoj George & R. Gautham
- Recorded: 22 September 2011
- Genre: Feature film soundtrack
- Language: Malayalam

The soundtrack is scored by debutant Manoj George, who had earlier composed for the 2008 Kannada film "Athmiya" and the Background music, "Va Va Vaadhyare" song by R. Gautham, who had previously worked with Jayasurya starrer film Janapriyan, and the lyrics by Santhosh Varma and Rajeev Nair Allunkal. The film has 4 songs.

Track list
No.	Title	Singer(s)	Length
1.	"Va Va Vaadhyare"		3:44
2.	"Ezham Karayil"		2:53
3.	"Kandenkilum"	Sujatha Mohan	2:55
4.	Untitled		5:39
5.	"Theme Music (Instrumental)" (R. Gautham)	Anoop Sankar
