= 3rd Class =

Indian Kannada-language period action film

3rd class
- Release poster
- Directed by: Ashok Dev
- Written by: Nam Jagadeesh
- Produced by: Nam Jagadeesh
- Starring: Nam Jagadeesh; Roopika; Divya Rao
- Cinematography: Syam Raj
- Edited by: Srikanth
- Music by: Jessie Gift
- Production company: 7Hills Studio
- Release date: 7 February 2020
- Country: India
- Language: Kannada

3rd Class is a 2020 Indian Kannada-language romantic action film directed by Ashok Dev and produced by Nam Jagadeesh under the banner of 7Hills Studio. The film starring Nam Jagadeesh, Roopika and Divya Rao, revolves around Sahana (Roopika) and Jagadeesh (Jaggi), who hails from the different socio-economic background. Sahana is a daughter of a home minister, while Jaggi is a mechanic. It is the story of their relationship and how they deal with this difference. The film was released on 7 February 2020.

== Cast ==
- Nam Jagadeesh as Jagadeesh
- Roopika as Sahana
- Divya Rao
- Avinash as Home Minister
- Sangeetha
- Pawan Kumar
- Harish Venkateshan
- Nippu
- Sai Gold Saravanan
- Ramesh Bhat

== Production ==
The film has been shot in Bangalore, Kerala and Goa. The film crew decided to help poor auto drivers and blind people instead of spending the money on banners as part of promoting their film.

== Release ==
The film was theatrically released on 7 February 2020.

== Soundtrack ==
3rd Class

Soundtrack album by Jassie Gift
- Released: 11 February 2020
- Recorded: 2019
- Genre: Feature film soundtrack
- Length: 19:56
- Label: Lahari Music
External audio
- Audio Jukebox on YouTube

Jessie Gift composed music for this film, and lyrics are penned by Dr. V. Nagendra Prasad, Kaviraj and Chethan. The soundtrack of the film was launched by blind students, orphan students and retired army soldiers. The team have distributed insurance bonds to 200 students worth of Rs. 2,50,000/-.

Track list
No.	Title	Lyrics	Artist(s)	Length
1.	"Hayagide"	Dr V. Nagendra Prasad	Karthik, Anuradha Bhat	4:29
2.	"Yaro Yaro"	Kaviraj	K. S. Chithra	4:44
3.	"Dayamadi Nanna Mannisu"	Kaviraj	Jessie Gift, K.S Chithra	4:20
4.	"Istavadha Ee Huduga"	Dr. Nagendra Prasad	Anuradha Bhat	1:42
5.	"Title Track"	Chethan	Shashank Sheshagiri	4:41
Total length:				19:56

== Reception ==
A critic called the film's story "power-packed".
