= Poly Varghese =

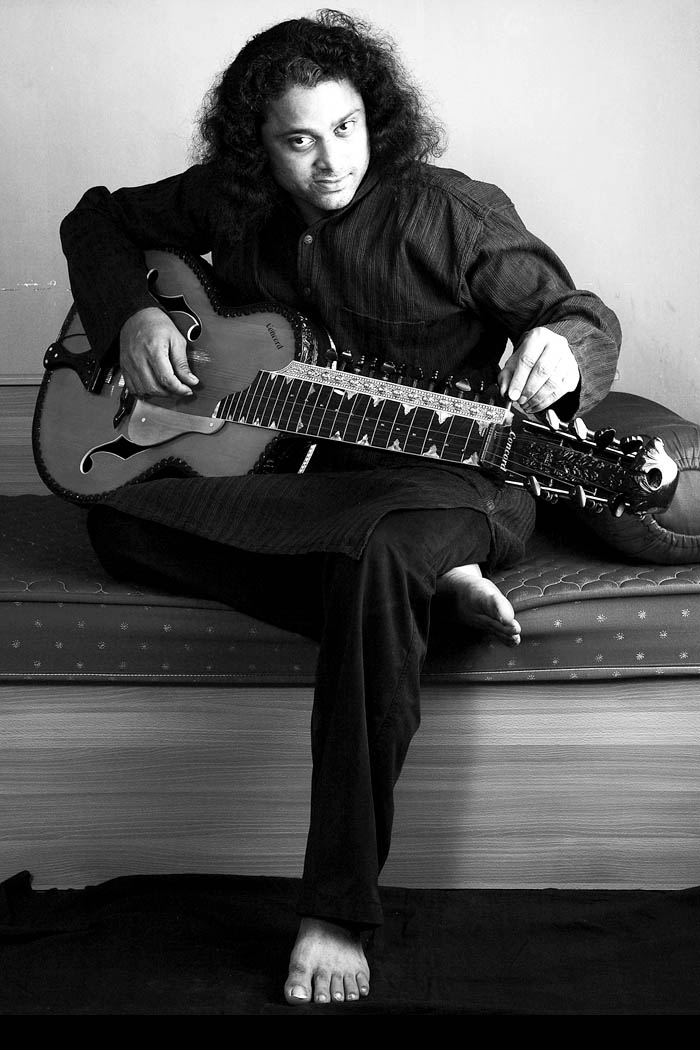

Background information
- Born: 1 June 1972 (age 53)
- Origin: Valapad, Kerala, India
- Genres: Indian classical music
- Occupation: Mohan Veena/Slide Guitar Player
- Instrument: Mohan Veena
- Years active: 2000–present
- Website: Official site

Poly Varghese (born 1 June 1972) is a Hindustani musician and Mohan veena player, a disciple of musician Vishwa Mohan Bhatt. He is also an actor, poet and activist.

== Personal life ==
Born in Kerala, Poly Varghese lives in Chennai.

== Awards ==
- Radio One Award for young Hindustani instrumentalist - 2012
- Jeevan Atless Award - Best Music Director for Malayalam film Kootilekku (Towards Home) - 2005
- Gov’t recognition award for young Hindustani instrumentalists of India - 2013
- Concerts at Bangkok University Thailand on behalf of hr. Princess Maha Chakri Sirindhoran and
- honored with the title Sangeeth Bhushan on behalf of Hindustani art and music society
