= Urvi (film) =

2017 film

- Urvi Kannada film
- Directed by: B.S.Pradeep Varma
- Written by: B.S.Pradeep Varma
- Screenplay by: B.S.Pradeep Varma
- Story by: B.S.Pradeep Varma
- Produced by: Airier Drreams
- Starring: Shruthi Hariharan; Shraddha Srinath; Shweta Pandit; Madhukar Niyogi; Prabhu Mundkur; Bhavani Prakash; Janvi Jyoti
- Cinematography: Anand Sundaresha
- Edited by: Surya Teja
- Music by: Manoj George
- Production company: Airier Drreams
- Release date: 17 March 2017
- Country: India
- Language: Kannada

Urvi (named after Urvi, one of the principal goddesses in Hinduism) is a 2017 Indian Kannada language crime drama film written and directed by B.S. Pradeep Varma and produced by Airier Drreams. The film has a mainly female lead cast, including Shruthi Hariharan, Shraddha Srinath, Shweta Pandit, Bhavani Prakash and Dr. Jhanvi. Achyuth Kumar, Madhukar Niyogi and Prabhu Mundkur (making his debut) play key supporting roles. The soundtrack and score for the film is composed by the Grammy Award winning violinist Manoj George. The cinematography is by Anand Sundaresha.

The principal photography of the film began on 4 February 2016 and released on 17 March 2017.

== Plot ==
The story starts with Naani (Rajesh Brahmavara) and his two daughters playfully pulling a boat from the shore. Devaragunda (Achyuth Kumar) and his sidekick arrive at the shore, enjoying the view and is immediately attracted to Naani's older, teenage daughter. He inappropriately approaches her, causing Naani to send them inside while he confronts Devru. Devru makes a deal with Naani that all of his debts will be paid off and he will have a prestigious position if Naani gives his daughter to Devru. Naani angrily objects, to which he is kicked down once before being sent home. The next day, Naani goes to Devru's residence to pay off his loans. As he is exiting, Naani suffers an impact to the head from Devru swinging a rod at him.

Suzie (Shraddha Srinath) wakes up suddenly, as what she had just felt was a recurring bad dream. Daisy (Shweta Pandit) comforts her and tells her to get ready, as they work in a brothel and have to satisfy the desires of men coming in. Daisy's younger sister Rashmi comes out to dance with them, where a womanizer wishes for her before the brothel's owner Bobby (Bhavani Prakash) angrily denies him. Afterwards, Daisy scolds Rashmi for coming out when she shouldn't have. Later that night, a graffiti artist by the name of Rooney (Madukar Niyogi) barely escapes from the police and sneaks into the brothel, where Suzie falls in love with him.

Devru is walking with his daughter Shwetha (Ananya Bhat) when they meet Shwetha's friend and senior, Asha (Shruthi Hariharan). After a brief introduction, Asha goes with her boyfriend Prakash (Prabhu Mundkur) to a coffee shop, where they discuss their future together. Later, Asha is studying at the library when she realizes that it is almost closing time. Before she leaves, she finds an abandoned purse next to her with a significant amount of money. As she is heading home, a man approaches her, asking her if she had seen a purse. She happily returns the purse to him and asks him to verify that the correct amount is there, to which the man exclaims that there is money missing. The two argue and go to the police station, where an FIR is submitted against Asha. Asha begs for the FIR to not be submitted on the promise that she will give the missing amount to the man in two days' time. When Asha has the money, she is told to meet the man at a hostel; the police conduct a raid on this hostel for prostitutes, and Asha is mistaken for one and is detained. Asha is bailed out only to be held at the same brothel where Daisy and Suzie are, on the orders of Devru, as she needs to stay there for a week before she can be trafficked. It is also revealed that after Devru hit Naani, he and his henchmen dragged him to the shore and beat him more, before Devru raped and killed Naani's eldest daughter. Naani weepingly approached his home and coped over his daughter while Devru's henchmen detained his other daughter, who is revealed to be Suzie, and Devru set fire to Naani's home.

After Rashmi commits suicide by jumping off of a ledge, Asha convinces Suzie and Daisy that they need to get out of the brothel and exact revenge on those who have mistreated them. The brothel erupts into chaos, eventually leading to Roonie being badly wounded and Daisy fatally shooting Bobby. Asha, Daisy, and Suzie escape and enlist the help of Shwetha to shame the latter's father of his actions. Unknowingly, Devru reveals his face as a sexual maniac to his own daughter. When he finds out that it was Shwetha, Devru is petrified and repents after Shwetha rejects him as a father and for destroying many lives just for his status and sexual hunger. Unable to withstand guilt, Devru recalls all those beautiful moments he had spent with his daughter before killing himself with a pistol.

Sometime later, Prakash shows up to meet Asha, where they embrace before Asha shows Prakash his contact in Bobby's phone. Prakash begs for forgiveness but Asha ruthlessly and fatally shoots him, as it is revealed that Prakash had helped Devru in kidnapping Asha.

== Cast ==
- Shruthi Hariharan as Asha
- Shraddha Srinath as Suzie
- Shweta Pandit as Daisy
- Achyuth Kumar as Devaragunda aka Devru
- Madhukar Niyogi as Rooney
- Prabhu Mundkur as Prakash
- Ananya Bhat as Shwetha
- Bhavani Prakash as Bobby
- Jhanvi
- Vasuki Vaibhav as Tupri
- Rajesh Brahmavara as Naani
- Raj Surya as Krishna

== Awards and nominations ==
- Won – New York City Indie Film Festival Best Feature Film 2017.
- Nomination – 2017 – First Ever Kannada Film To Get Officially Selected & Nominated For The Best Feature Film At Los Angeles Film Awards 2017.
- Nomination – 2017 – Officially Selected At Miami Independent Film Festival For Best Feature Film 2017.
- Nomination – 2017 – Officially Selected At Cyprus International Film Festival For Best Feature Film 2017.
- Nomination – 2017 – Officially Selected At Ischia Film Festival Italy For Best Feature Film 2017.
- Nominated - 2017 - 64th Filmfare Awards South for Best Film -Kannada
- Nominated - 2017 - Bhavani Prakash - 64th Filmfare Awards South for Best Actor In a Supporting Role - Female - Kannada

== Soundtrack ==
Urvi

Soundtrack album by Manoj George
- Released: 24 December 2016
- Recorded: 2016
- Genre: Feature film soundtrack
- Language: Kannada

Manoj George, an internationally acclaimed violinist, expertise in experimental compositions on different styles of music, who composed music for several albums, feature films, ads, documentary films and the first Indian violinist to be recognized by the Grammy Award, has composed the film's music. The released album consists of six songs and two karaoke versions. On 24 December 2016, the audio was officially launched by the ace director T. S. Nagabharana along with Hamsalekha Lucky Ali and Ricky Kej.

No.	Title	Lyrics	Artist(s)	Length
1.	"Adhara Madhura"	B.S.Pradeep Varma	Manoj George, Teenu Treasa	04:28
2.	"Thili Prema / lyrics"	Suvarna Sharma	Charan Raj, Madhushree Narayan	04:34
3.	"Kelu Ranga Kelu"		Vasuki Vaibhav, Shweta Pandit, Bhavani Prakash, Navya	04:08
4.	"Kanna Hani"		K. S. Chithra	04:06
5.	"Urvi Theme Song"		Sylvester Pradeep	02:18
6.	"Thili Prema (Guitar version)"		Madhushree Narayan	04:20
7.	"Adhara Madhura (Karaoke)"			04:31
8.	"Thili Prema (Karaoke)"			04:41
