= Manoj George =

Indian violinist and a music composer

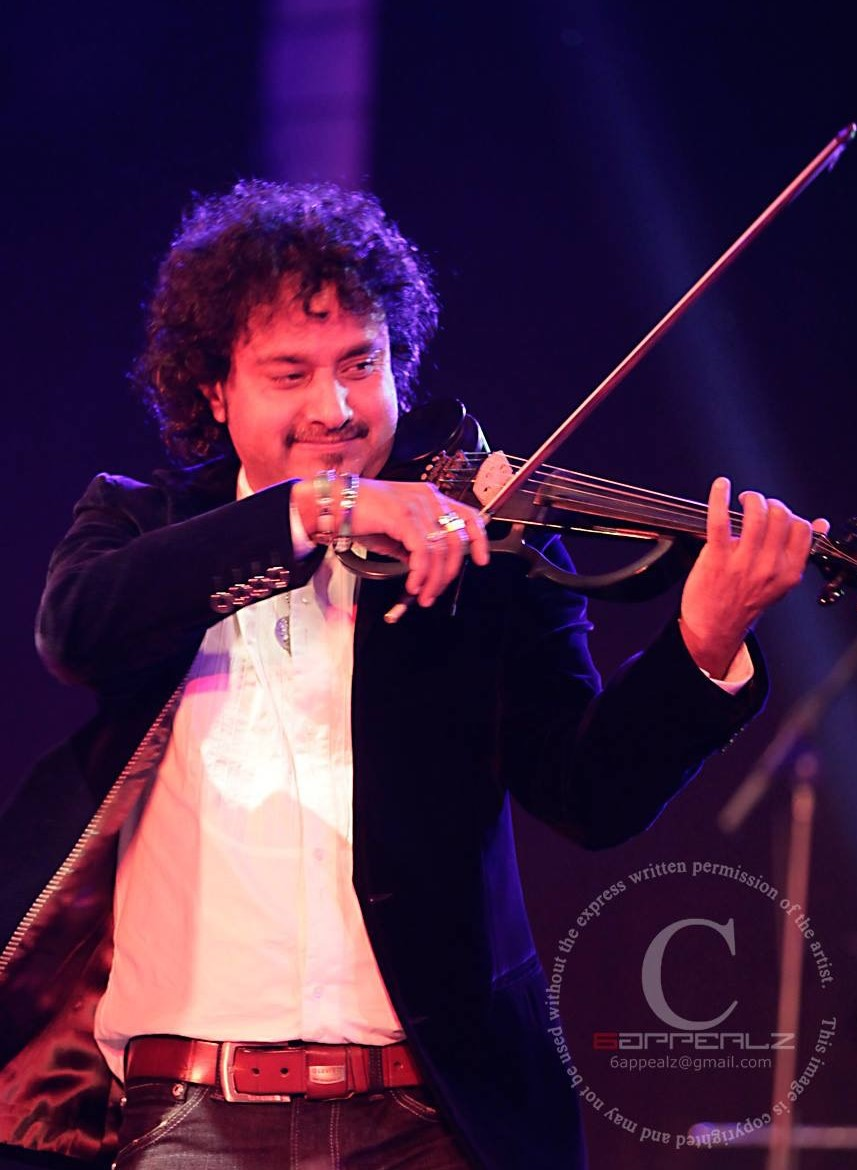
- Manoj George

Background information
- Origin: Olarikkara, Thrissur, Kerala, India
- Genres: World fusion, Indian fusion, Contemporary, Classical, Indian blues, Indo jazz, Indian folk music, Rock music New-age
- Occupations: Violinist, Music composer, Music Arranger, Music Director,
- Instrument: Violin
- Years active: 1987–present
- Website: manojgeorge.com

Manoj George (born in Olarikkara, Thrissur district, Keralais) an Indian violinist and a music composer. He performed as the conductor, string arranger, solo violinist and choral arranger of 3 Grammy Award Winning albums : Winds of Samsara, in 2015, Divine Tides in 2022 for the Best New Age Album & Divine Tides in 2023 as the Best Immersive Audio album. He is reported to be the first Indian violinist recognised by the National Academy of Recording Arts and Sciences, The Grammys, United States and the first Malayali violinist to receive the honour. Manoj George has won several accolades for his Music Compositions including a nomination to HollyWood Music in Media awards and 3 Global Music Awards.

Manoj George estimated to be performed at more than 3000 concerts around the globe. He has composed music for Malayalam and Kannada films, documentary films, corporate movies and advertisements. He is the brand ambassador for YAMAHA Violins, ROLAND- Japan, CANTINI Electric Violins - Italy & STENTOR Violins - UK.

Manoj George is known for his own compositions and noted for introducing contemporary styles on violin amalgamating western music with Indian classical. His experiments in Indian music with different styles of music from different parts of the world like blues, Latin, Indo jazz etc. brought him to be one of the famous violinists in India. He is an avid humanitarian and philanthropist, donating, raising money, and supporting charities.

Manoj George and Fr. Paul Poovathingal released Sarvesa, a Sanskrit rendition of the Lord's Prayer. Pope Francis officially launched the track at the Vatican on November 20, 2024.

Sarvesa features performances by legendary singer Padma Vibhushan Dr. K. J. Yesudas, Fr. Paul Poovathingal, Ricky Kej, Rakesh Chaurasia, the Los Angeles Orchestra, and a chorus of 100 priests and 100 nuns. It won the Global Music Awards 2025 for Best Production and Best Composition. Sarvesa is a noble project to help the brain development of children affected with autism, cerebral palsy and intellectual disability through Neurologic Music Therapy by Chetana Ganashram.

== Awards and recognitions ==
- 2025 - Sarvesa Composed and Produced by Manoj George & Fr. Paul Poovathingal was the Global Music Award Winner for Best Composition and Best Production.
- 2024 - Performed as the Musician for the album Break of Dawn which was a Grammy Award Nominee for the Best New Age, Ambient or Chant Album
- 2023 - Performed as the Conductor, Arranger and Musician for the album Divine Tides which won the Grammy Award for the Best Immersive Audio Album
- 2022 - Performed as the Conductor, Arranger and Musician for the album Divine Tides which won the Grammy Award for the Best New Age Album.
- 2020 - Manoj George had nominated for Hollywood Music in Media Awards for the world category for his composition "Sparkling Celebrations"
- 2019 - Manoj George's original composition - "Saraswati", which highlights cultural harmony by blending western and Carnatic styles has won Silver medal (Outstanding Achievement award) from Global Music awards in 2019.
- 2018 - He was also the music director for the film Urvi which has been nominated by the Los Angeles Film Awards in 2017 and won the best feature film at New York city film awards in 2018.
- 2015 - Recognised by The Grammy, where he performed as the conductor, string arranger, violinist and choral arranger for the album Winds of Samsara, which won the Grammy Award for the Best New Age Album.
- 2001 - He scored the background music for a Malayalam film " Gharaksharangal " which won the National Film Award for Best Children's Film.

Recognitions

- Represented Kerala & Lakshadweep NCC directorate as the cultural leader at the Republic Day Camp Held in New Delhi in 1990. He was awarded a scholarship from the Ministry of Human Resource and Culture, Govt. of India, New Delhi for the years 1992–1994.
- He was honored by Oommen Chandy the Chief Minister of Kerala for his achievements in music on 25 August 2015 in Thiruvananthapuram, the capital city of Kerala.
- He is the first Indian violinist to serve as the Brand Ambassador for Yamaha, Volins, Roland Corporation Japan, Cantini Electric violins Italy, & Stentor Violins, UK.

== Performances ==
Manoj George has performed widely in India and across the World with various groups, musicians and at numerous prestigious events (>3000 performances).

Manoj George has composed "Burning Love" for Pope Francis for his 83rd birthday celebration at HongKong and Macau on 13th and 15th of Dec 2019. The music track was accompanied by a chamber orchestra from Vienna conducted by Francois-Pierre Descamps and the soprano by the famous German singer Barbara Kajetanowicz along with his solo violin. Manoj George composed this music in Raga Jog combining different styles music from different parts of the world.

His notable concerts include the performance at the Miss World pageant in 1996, opening act for Canadian rock musician, Bryan Adams and representing India at the World Military Games. He represented Kerala and Lakshadweep NCC (National Cadet Corps) (India) Directorate as the Cultural Leader at the Republic Day Camp Held in New Delhi in 1990. He is the first Indian violinist to perform in United Nations as part of "Breathe life for healthy people-Healthy planet" for first WHO global conference on Air pollution and Health.

He has performed with many legendary musicians like Pt. Vishwa Mohan Bhatt, Hariharan, Shankar Mahadevan, L. Subramaniam, Stewart Copeland, Trilok Gurtu, Shivamani, Wouter Kellerman, Ricky Kej, Raghu Dixit, Lonnie Park, Firdaus Orchestra by A R Rahman, Lucky Ali, Dr. K J Yesudas, K S Chitra and many more. He has also scored and recorded with Royal Philharmonic Orchestra at Abbey Road studio, London.

== Musical style and compositions ==
`.

== Philanthropic work ==
Manoj George spends time on charity activities, fund raising programs and is a patron of the charitable organization Little flower charitable society, which is a movement to improve the quality life of poor.

Manoj has initiated a campaign to recognize independent musicians in India. "He pointed out that the music industry needed a boost. This can be in the form of awards for non-film music, which would be a game-changer. Cinema is the pivot around which majority of musicians revolve. But the fact is that hardly 20 per cent of the musicians, singers included, manage to break into films. The rest of them simply survive without recognition for their talent and hard work." Manoj wants to change this imbalance, albeit gradually. Internationally the scene is so different. "Michael Jackson, Brian Adams and Shakira became stars through parallel music and not by singing in films. Even in India, there was a time when independent musicians such as Daler Mehndi, Alisha Chinai and Lucky Ali, and their albums were so popular.

Manoj's mission is to "Change Lives through Music" as well as to make and perform music for those who rarely find their way to concerts, like a performance he had done on Bangalore jail. He recognizes that such performances are very inspiring. The happiness and joy from the audience is a different".

== Early life ==
Manoj George was born in Olarikkara, in Thrissur, Kerala. After completing his graduation, he moved out to Bangalore to pursue work as a Music composer, live performer and violinist. He holds a Licentiate (degree) (LTCL) performer in Violin from the Trinity College London.

Manoj first picked up the violin when he was 13. During his childhood days, he always used to get fascinated by a melodious sound coming from his church Choir. Later realized that the beautiful sound was coming from Violin, the eagerness towards that sound always made him sit next to the church choir, violin player and watch the violinist play. The mesmerizing sound haunted him all the time and that got developed into a wish that he should learn that instrument. As a child, he used to sing quite well and participated in all competitions. His father was the first to notice his interests in music and asked him if he is interested to learn any instruments, and that realization reached to Leslie Peter, started learning Violin from his Guru, Kerala's’s famed tutor Sri. Leslie Peter in Kalasadan, Thrissur.

While he was working towards his bachelor's degree, he was awarded scholarship from the Ministry of Human Resources and Culture, Govt. of India, New Delhi. This recognition changed the course of his life. This was a very tough decision as it was very unusual, rare and not accepted among the crowd during this period. Post completion of his graduation at St. Aloysius college in Thrissur, Fr. Thomas Chakkalamattath, director of Chetana Music Academy guided him to Pondicherry for further studies in western classical music. Manoj studied in Pondicherry for 3 years until he completed Licentiate certification (LTCL) under the guidance of Sr. Mary Judith. At the same time, he would travel to Bangalore, Mumbai, and Chennai for master violin classes from luminaries like Philomena Thumboochetty, Galina Heifetz and Arvind Santwan. Manoj has drawn inspiration from renowned musicians like L Subramanyam, Stephane Grappelli, Jean Luc Ponty, John Mac, Yanni and the journey of the popular violinist began.

Manoj George resides in Bangalore with his family, spouse Susha Manoj, Neil Manoj and Niya Rose.

== Career ==
After a few years of learning Violin, his teacher offered him to play for concerts, he was truly excited about this offer, since he was still in his 10th grade. He was the youngest in the popular band of Kerala, Thrissur Kalasadan. This gave him an opportunity to perform with legendary singers like KJ Yesudas, KS Chitra, P Jayachandran etc. This also given him an opportunity to play for studio recording sessions, movies and album at a very young age. Post Completing Licentiate of Trinity College London (LTCL) performer in Violin Sr. Judith introduced him to Mrs. Sunderlal, Director of Bangalore School of Music, who offered him to teach at Bangalore Music School and as well started performing at the Bangalore Chamber of Orchestra.

After collaborating with multiple bands, he established his own the world fusion band "ManojGeorge 4Strings", production house "NewWave Productions" and the music school "Manoj George School of Music".

ManojGeorge 4Strings - The world fusion music band

ManojGeorge 4Strings was established in 2009 and performs at corporate events, music festivals, public events, and college festivals. The band combines traditional musical elements with contemporary arrangements, incorporating a range of musical styles into its performances. Its repertoire includes original compositions alongside interpretations of well-known works. ManojGeorge 4Strings has also collaborated with musicians and chamber orchestras from various parts of the world.

Manoj George School of Music

The music school in Bangalore was established in 2009. Manoj George's passion for music, his interest to share his experience and knowledge to the next generations made him initiate this endeavour. His music academy has three centre's - Kasavanahalli, and Sarjapur road, Bangalore. Manoj George also finds time in taking music classes in Sarjapur Road center whenever he is in Bangalore.

My Journey with Violin

Manoj George has published his first book "My journey with violin - Violin Method for Beginners" in September 2020 by Lucky Ali. The book is a guide to beginners describing how to play violin and read music in a simple way. This Violin tutorial is available in amazon. Audio/Minus Track of this book is available in Manoj George's YouTube channel "","

== Filmography ==
No.	Year	Title	Starring	Director	Language	Notes
01	2000	Gharaksharangal	Siddique, Sruthi Lakshmi, Sona Nair, Srihari, TP Madhavan, Manka Mahesh, Master Arun, Rinsa Salim, Sadiq	Salim Padiyath	Malayalam	Music Director This film won the National Film Award for Best Children's Film
02	2008	Athmeeya	Akul Balaji, Nivedhitha, Rangayana Raghu	Govindaraj	Kannada	Music Director
03	2012	Vaadhyar	Jayasurya, Menaka, Ann Augustine, Nedumudi Venu	Nidheesh Sakthi	Malayalam	Composed 2 songs for the film
04	2015	The Legend of Molokai	Fr. Ranjit	Tony P Varghese	Malayalam	Music Director
05	2017	Urvi	Sruthi Hariharan, Shraddha Srinath	B. S. Pradeep Kumar	Kannada	Music Director
06	2023	Rani Chithira Marthanda	Kottayam Nazeer, Joskutty Jacob Kochuparambil, Sini Abraham, Vaisakh Vijayan, Keerthana Sreekumar, Kiran Peethambaran	Pinku Peter	Malayalam	Music Director
